= 2016–17 Hapoel Be'er Sheva F.C. season =

Hapoel Be'er Sheva F.C
2016–17 season
- Chairman: Asi Rahamim
- Manager: Barak Bakhar
- Stadium: Turner Stadium
- Top goalscorer: League: Anthony Nwakaeme (5); All: Lúcio Maranhão (6)
Home colours	Away colours	Third colours

The 2016–17 season Hapoel Be'er Sheva season was the clubs's 82nd season since its establishment in 1934, and 69th since the establishment of the State of Israel. During the 2016–17 campaign the club have competed in the Israeli Premier League, State Cup, Toto Cup, UEFA Champions League.

Hapoel Be'er Sheva won the Toto Cup after defeating Hapoel Ironi Kiryat Shmona in the final.

== Current squad ==
Note: Flags indicate national team as defined under FIFA eligibility rules; some limited exceptions apply. Players may hold more than one non-FIFA nationality.

No.	Pos.	Nation	Player
1	GK	ISR	David Goresh
22	GK	ISR	Robi Levkovich
55	GK	ISR	Guy Haimov
2	DF	ISR	Ben Bitton
3	DF	ISR	Ben Turjeman
4	DF	POR	Miguel Vítor
5	DF	ISR	Shir Tzedek
13	DF	ISR	Ofir Davidzada
17	DF	ISR	Matan Ohayon
20	DF	ISR	Loai Taha
21	DF	ISR	Noam Gamon
25	DF	BRA	William Soares
26	DF	ISR	Amit Bitton
7	MF	ISR	Maharan Radi
11	MF	ISR	Maor Buzaglo

No.	Pos.	Nation	Player
12	MF	ROU	Ovidiu Hoban
15	MF	ISR	Vladimir Brown
19	MF	ISR	Dan Bitton
24	MF	ISR	Maor Melikson
28	MF	ISR	Or Havivyan
30	MF	NGR	John Ogu
—	MF	ISR	Yuval Shabtay
4	FW	ISR	Musa Tarabin
8	FW	ISR	Liel Sportas
9	FW	NGR	Anthony Nwakaeme
10	FW	ISR	Elyaniv Barda (Captain)
14	FW	ISR	Ben Sahar
16	FW	ISR	Mohammad Ghadir

== Transfers ==
=== Summer ===
In:

No.	Pos.	Nation	Player
—	GK	ISR	Guy Haimov (from (Israel) Hapoel Ironi Kiryat Shmona)
—	DF	POR	Miguel Vítor (from (Greece) PAOK)
—	MF	ISR	Yuval Shabtay (from (Israel) Hapoel Ra'anana)
—	MF	ISR	Roei Gordana (loan return from (Israel) Maccabi Petah Tikva)
—	FW	BRA	Lúcio Maranhão (from (Brazil) CRB)

Out:

No.	Pos.	Nation	Player
—	GK	ISR	Robi Levkovich (to (Israel) Hapoel Haifa)
—	DF	BRA	William Soares (Free Agent)
—	DF	ISR	Ofir Davidzada (to (Belgium) Gent)
—	MF	ISR	Or Havivyan (on loan to (Israel) Hapoel Petah Tikva)
—	FW	ISR	Liel Saportas (on loan to (Israel) Hapoel Petah Tikva)
—	FW	ISR	Musa Tarabin (on loan to (Israel) Hapoel Bnei Lod)
—	FW	ISR	Amran Alkrenawi (on loan to (Israel) Hapoel Bnei Lod)

== Pre-season and friendlies ==
29 June 2016 Training Camp	Hapoel Be'er Sheva (Israel)	3–0	(Poland) Śląsk Wrocław
18:30	Buzaglo 23' 31'; Radi 40'

2 July 2016 Training Camp	Hapoel Be'er Sheva (Israel)	2–1	(Poland) Pogoń Szczecin
	Buzaglo 52'; Shabtay 82'		Frączczak 65'

5 July 2016 Training Camp	Hapoel Be'er Sheva (Israel)	1–0	(Poland) Ruch Chorzów
	Barda 62'

=== Israeli Premier League ===
20 August 2016 1	Hapoel Be'er Sheva	2–1	Hapoel Ra'anana	Be'er Sheva
20:10	Sahar 11'; Tzedek (yellow card) 37'; Radi 42'; Brown (yellow card) 73'	Summary	Yarden Cohen (yellow card) 5'; Levy (yellow card) 40'; Mbola (yellow card) 58'; Mihelič 75' (pen.); Mohammed Shaker (yellow card) 85'	Stadium: Turner Stadium; Referee: (Israel) Orel Grinfeeld

27 August 2016 2	Hapoel Tel Aviv	0–0	Hapoel Be'er Sheva	Petah Tikva
21:00		Summary	Tzedek (yellow card) 12'; Bitton (yellow card) 27'; Brown (yellow card) 51'; Radi (yellow card) 66'	Stadium: HaMoshava Stadium; Referee: (Israel) Liran Liany

10 September 2016 3	Hapoel Be'er Sheva	3–0	Bnei Sakhnin	Be'er Sheva
20:10	Nwakaeme 49' 80'; Tzadek (yellow card) 73'; Lúcio Maranhão 85'	Report	Falah (yellow card) 61'	Stadium: Turner Stadium; Referee: (Israel) Eli Hacmon

19 September 2016 4	Maccabi Haifa	2–1	Hapoel Be'er Sheva	Haifa
20:45	Rukavytsya 22' (pen.); Kahat (yellow card) 38'; Ryan (yellow card) 52'; Plet 80'	Report	Buzaglo 14'; Turjeman (yellow card) 21'; Miguel Vítor (yellow card) 66'	Stadium: Sammy Ofer Stadium; Referee: (Israel) Eitan Shemeulevitch

=== State Cup ===
5 January 2017 Last 32	Hapoel Be'er Sheva	2–0	Maccabi Tzur Shalom	Be'er Sheva
19:40	Melikson 55'; Ghadir 61'	Report	Saar Dhahn (yellow card) 21'; Yonatan Yossipovich (yellow card) 75'	Stadium: Turner Stadium; Referee: (Israel) Menashe Mashiah

24 January 2017 Last 16	Hapoel Be'er Sheva	1–2	Ironi Kiryat Shmona	Be'er Sheva
20:55	Melikson 45+2'; Brown (yellow card) 75'	Report	Mauricio 6' 71'; Brossou (yellow card) 40' (yellow-red card); Nitzan (yellow card) 90'	Stadium: Turner Stadium; Referee: (Israel) Alon Yefet

=== Toto Cup Al ===
Pos	Team	Pld	W	D	L	GF	GA	GD	Pts	Qualification or relegation	ASH	HBS	HAS	BEI
1	F.C. Ashdod	3	2	1	0	6	3	+3	7	Qualified to Quarter-finals	—		2–2	3–1
2	Hapoel Be'er Sheva	3	2	0	1	9	3	+6	6	Qualified to Quarter-finals	0–1	—		
3	Hapoel Ashkelon	3	0	2	1	3	8	−5	2			0–5	—	1–1
4	Beitar Jerusalem	3	0	1	2	4	8	−4	1			2–4		—

Updated to match(es) played on 10 August 2016. Source: Israel Football Association
Legend: Blue = home team win; Yellow = draw; Red = away team win.
Rules for classification: 1) points; 2) goal difference; 3) number of wins; 4) goals scored; 5) head to head; 6)deciding match.

30 July 2016 Group 3 game 1	Hapoel Ashkelon	0–5	Hapoel Be'er Sheva	Rishon LeZion
21:00	Lior Hidrian (yellow card) 49'	Report	Lúcio Maranhão 23'; Bitton (yellow card) 38'; Hoban 40'; Sahar 51' (pen.); Buzaglo 59'; Biton 66'	Stadium: Haberfeld Stadium; Referee: (Israel) Alon Yefet

7 August 2016 Group 3 game 2	Beitar Jerusalem	2–4	Hapoel Be'er Sheva	Jerusalem
19:00	Cohen 22'; Abuhatzira 45'; Moyal (yellow card) 66'; Atzili (yellow card) 79'	Report	Lúcio Maranhão 35'; Bitton (yellow card) 58'; Radi 70'; Barda 81' (pen.); Buzaglo 84'	Stadium: Teddy Stadium; Referee: (Israel) Eitan Shemeulevitch

9 August 2016 Group 3 game 3	Hapoel Be'er Sheva	0–1	Ashdod	Be'er Sheva
19:30	Shabtay (yellow card) 50'	Report	Bagarić (yellow card) 40'; Lior Inbrum (yellow card) 56'; David 66'	Stadium: Turner Stadium; Referee: (Israel) Gal Laibuvitz

22 September 2016 Quarter Final First Leg	Maccabi Haifa	2–2	Hapoel Be'er Sheva	Haifa
21:00	Habshi (yellow card) 16'; Mugrabi 32' (pen.); Gozlan 46'; Musa (yellow card) 52'; Menahem (yellow card) 59'	Report	Korhut 43'; Gordana 72'; Taha (yellow card) 84'	Stadium: Sammy Ofer Stadium; Referee: (Israel) Orel Grinfeeld

30 November 2016 Quarter Final Second Leg	Hapoel Be'er Sheva	2–1 (4–3 agg.)	Maccabi Haifa	Be'er Sheva
19:00	Taha (yellow card) 36'; Nwakaeme 77' 78'	Report	Kahat (yellow card) 21'; Gozlan (yellow card) 36'; Glazer (yellow card) 66'; Rukavytsya 88' (pen.); Ryan (yellow card) 90'	Stadium: Turner Stadium; Referee: (Israel) Orel Grinfeeld

15 December 2016 Semi Final	Hapoel Be'er Sheva	2–1	Hapoel Haifa	Netanya
19:30	Barda (yellow card) 10'; Sahar (yellow card) 35' (goal) 44' 54' (pen.); Shabtay (yellow card) 45'; Bitton (yellow card) 90'	Report	Jazvić 10'; Fishler (yellow card) 38'; Serdal (yellow card) 63'	Stadium: Netanya Stadium; Referee: (Israel) Oren Siminyan

28 December 2016 Final	Hapoel Be'er Sheva	4–1	Ironi Kiryat Shmona	Netanya
20:00	Sahar 34' (pen.) 36'; Radi 73'; Barda 90'	Report	Amir Nassar (yellow card) 38'; N'Douassel (yellow card) 45'; Turjeman 70' (o.g.)	Stadium: Netanya Stadium; Referee: (Israel) Ziv Adler

== UEFA Champions League ==
=== Second qualifying round ===
12 July 2016 First leg	Hapoel Be'er Sheva (Israel)	3–2	(Moldova) Sheriff Tiraspol	Be'er Sheva, Israel
19:50	Hoban (yellow card) 4'; Ogu 43'; Barda 52' (pen.); Taha (yellow card) 61'; Melikson (yellow card) 87'; Radi 90' (pen.)	Report	Aliti (yellow card) 9' (yellow-red card) 26'; Ivančić 22'; Dupovac (yellow card) 51'; Brezovec 64'	Stadium: Turner Stadium; Referee: Carlos del Cerro Grande (Spain)

19 July 2016 Second leg	Sheriff Tiraspol (Moldova)	0–0	(Israel) Hapoel Be'er Sheva	Tiraspol, Moldova
20:00	Kvržić (yellow card) 20'; Metoua (yellow card) 21'; Galešić (yellow card) 77'; Ivančić (yellow card) 87'		Ogu (yellow card) 20'; Goresh (yellow card) 84'; Hoban (yellow card) 42' (yellow-red card) 90+4'	Stadium: Sheriff Stadium

=== Third qualifying round ===
27 July 2016 First leg	Olympiacos (Greece)	0–0	(Israel) Hapoel Be'er Sheva	Piraeus, Greece
	Botía (yellow card) 49'; Figueiras (yellow card) 53'		Ogu (yellow card) 27'; Brown (yellow card) 46'; Vitor (yellow card) 56'; Bitton (yellow card) 68'	Stadium: Karaiskakis Stadium

3 August 2016 Second leg	Hapoel Be'er Sheva (Israel)	1–0	(Greece) Olympiacos F.C.	Be'er Sheva, Israel
21:00	Lúcio (yellow card) 68'; Tzedek 79'		Bouchalakis (yellow card) 5'; Figueiras (yellow card) 49'; Botía (yellow card) 78'; Milivojević (yellow card) 85'; Cost (yellow card) 86'	Stadium: Turner Stadium

==== Play-Off Round ====
17 August 2016 Play-Off Round	Celtic (Scotland)	5–2	(Israel) Hapoel Be'er Sheva	Glasgow, Scotland
	Rogic 9'; Sinclair (yellow card) 30'; Griffiths 39', 45+1'; Dembélé 73'; Brown 85'; Touré (yellow card) 87'; Forrest (yellow card) 90+1'	Report	Goresh (yellow card) 10'; Tzedek (yellow card) 45'; Maranhão 55'; Melikson 57'; Taha (yellow card) 90+4'	Stadium: Celtic Park; Attendance: 52,659; Referee: (Slovenia) Damir Skomina

23 August 2016 Play-Off Round	Hapoel Be'er Sheva (Israel)	2–0 (4–5 agg.)	(Scotland) Celtic	Be'er Sheva, Israel
	Sahar 21'; Hoban 48'; Shabtay (yellow card) 90+3'	Report	Janko (yellow card) 14'; McGregor (yellow card) 56'; Lustig (yellow card) 66'; Gordon (yellow card) 90+2'	Stadium: Turner Stadium; Attendance: 15,383; Referee: (Netherlands) Bas Nijhuis

== UEFA Europa League ==
=== Group stage ===
Pos	Team	Pld	W	D	L	GF	GA	GD	Pts	Qualification	SPP	HBS	SOU	INT
1	(Czech Republic) Sparta Prague	6	4	0	2	8	6	+2	12	Advance to knockout phase	—	2–0	1–0	3–1
2	(Israel) Hapoel Be'er Sheva	6	2	2	2	6	6	0	8	Advance to knockout phase	0–1	—	0–0	3–2
3	(England) Southampton	6	2	2	2	6	4	+2	8		3–0	1–1	—	2–1
4	(Italy) Internazionale	6	2	0	4	7	11	−4	6		2–1	0–2	1–0	—

Source: UEFA
Legend: Blue = home team win; Yellow = draw; Red = away team win.
Rules for classification: Group stage tiebreakers

15 September 2016 1	Internazionale (Italy)	0–2	(Israel) Hapoel Be'er Sheva	Milan, Italy
21:05 CEST (UTC+02:00)	Murillo (yellow card) 53'	Report	Buzaglo (yellow card) 36', (goal) 69'; Bitton (yellow card) 43'; Vítor 54'; Turjeman (yellow card) 85'; Taha (yellow card) 90+1'	Stadium: San Siro; Attendance: 16,778; Referee: Jakob Kehlet (Denmark)

29 September 2016 Group Stage	Hapoel Be'er Sheva (Israel)	0–0	(England) Southampton	Be'er Sheva, Israel
18:00 BST	Vitor (yellow card) 62'; Sahar (yellow card) 86'	Report		Stadium: Turner Stadium; Referee: Stefan Johannesson

20 October 2016 Group Stage	Hapoel Be'er Sheva (Israel)	0–1	(Czech Republic) Sparta Prague	Be'er Sheva, Israel
18:00 BST		Summary	Juliš (yellow card) 28'; Holek (yellow card) 67'; Pulkrab 71'; Dočkal (yellow card) 90'	Stadium: Turner Stadium; Attendance: 15,607; Referee: (Croatia) Ivan Bebek

3 November 2016 Group Stage	Sparta Prague (Czech Republic)	2–0	(Israel) Hapoel Be'er Sheva	Prague, Czech Republic
20:05 BST	Bitton 23' (o.g.); Lafata 38'; Karavayev (yellow card) 71'; Pulkrab (yellow card) 88'	Summary		Stadium: Generali Arena; Attendance: 12,891; Referee: (Hungary) István Vad

24 November 2016 Group Stage	Hapoel Be'er Sheva (Israel)	3–2	(Italy) Internazionale	Be'er Sheva, Israel
18:00 BST	Korhut (yellow card) 19'; Lúcio Maranhão (yellow card) 42' (goal) 58'; Bitton (yellow card) 55'; Nwakaeme (yellow card) 64' (goal) 71' (pen.); Sahar 90+3'	Summary	Icardi 12'; Brozović 25'; Handanović (yellow card) 45' (yellow-red card); Nagatomo (yellow card) 87'	Stadium: Turner Stadium; Attendance: 15,973; Referee: (Spain) Javier Estrada

8 December 2016 Group Stage	Southampton (England)	1–1	(Israel) Hapoel Be'er Sheva	Southampton, England
20:05 BST	Bertrand (yellow card) 48' van Dijk 90+1'	Summary	Ogu (yellow card) 42'; Miguel Vítor (yellow card) 45+1'; Tzedek (yellow card) 61'; Buzaglo 78'; Goresh (yellow card) 81'	Stadium: St Mary's Stadium; Attendance: 30,416; Referee: (Italy) Paolo Tagliavento

=== Knockout Phase ===
16 February 2017 Round of 32 – 1st leg	Hapoel Be'er Sheva (Israel)	1–3	(Turkey) Beşiktaş	Be'er Sheva, Israel
22:05 (IST)	Tzedek (yellow card) 5'; Barda 44'	Report	42' (o.g.) William; 60' Tosun; 90+3' Hutchinson	Stadium: Turner Stadium; Attendance: 15,347; Referee: (England) Martin Atkinson

23 February 2017 Round of 32 – 2nd leg	Beşiktaş (Turkey)	2–1 (5–2 agg.)	(Israel) Hapoel Be'er Sheva	Istanbul, Turkey
20:00 (IST)	Aboubakar 17'; Tosun 87'; Marcelo (yellow card) 89'	Report	64' Nwakaeme; (yellow card) 89' Barda	Stadium: Vodafone Park; Attendance: 27,892; Referee: (Slovenia) Matej Jug
