= Noam Gamon =

Israeli footballer

Personal information
- Date of birth: 8 March 1997 (age 29)
- Place of birth: Be'er Sheva, Israel
- Height: 1.75 m (5 ft 9 in)
- Position: Right back

Team information
- Current team: F.C. Dimona

Youth career
- 2007–2017: Hapoel Be'er Sheva

Senior career*
| Years | Team | Apps | (Gls) |
| 2015– | Hapoel Be'er Sheva | 0 | (0) |
| 2017–2019 | → Hapoel Afula (Loan) | 68 | (0) |
| 2019–2020 | → Hapoel Kfar Saba (Loan) | 17 | (0) |
| 2021–2022 | → Hapoel Ra'anana (Loan) | 12 | (0) |
| 2023– | → F.C. Dimona | 2 | (0) |

International career
| 2013 | Israel U-16 | 6 | (0) |
| 2013 | Israel U-17 | 7 | (0) |
| 2015–2016 | Israel U-19 | 15 | (1) |
| 2017 | Israel U-21 | 3 | (0) |
- * Club domestic league appearances and goals as of 10 February 2024 (UTC)

Noam Gamon (Hebrew: נועם גמון; born 8 March 1997) is an Israeli footballer who plays as a right defender for F.C. Dimona. Gamon played on all of Israel's Junior National Teams.

== Career ==
=== Early career ===
Gamon grew up playing for the youth division of Hapoel Be'er Sheva. On 16 August 2015, during the 2015–16 season, while playing on the club's youth team, he made his debut in the Toto Cup, in a 0–0 draw to Maccabi Netanya at Netanya Stadium.

On July 30, 2016, during the 2016–17 season, he made his second appearance in the Toto Cup final, in a 5–0 win over Hapoel Ashkelon at Sala Stadium. Gamon was a member of Hapoel Be'er Sheva, who won the Toto Cup, having won 4–1 over Ironi Kiryat Shmona at Netanya Stadium. On January 31, 2017, during the winter transfer window, he was loaned to Hapoel Afula from the Liga Leumit until the end of the season. On 6 February 2017, he made his debut in a 0–0 draw against Hapoel Acre at Acre Municipal Stadium. By the end of the season, Gamon had 14 appearances in the Liga Leumit.

During the 2017–18 season, he was loaned to Hapoel Afula until the end of the season from the Liga Leumit. On 6 December 2017 he was a member of the Hapoel Afula win in the Toto Cup Leumit, following a 3–0 win over Hapoel Ramat Gan at Grundman Stadium. By the end of the season he had made 34 league appearances. During the 2018–19 season, Gamon was loaned to Hapoel Afula until the end of the season from the Liga Leumit. Gamon made 20 league appearances and three more appearances in the State Cup, helping Hapoel Afula finish at the top of the table.

On July 11, 2019, Gamon was loaned to Hapoel Kfar Saba from the Israeli Premier League.

== Career statistics ==
As of 10 February 2024

| Club | Season | League | League | | Cup | | League Cup | | Europe | | Other | | Total | |
| Club | Season | League | Apps | Goals | Apps | Goals | Apps | Goals | Apps | Goals | Apps | Goals | Apps | Goals |
|---|---|---|---|---|---|---|---|---|---|---|---|---|---|---|
| Hapoel Be'er Sheva | 2015–16 | Israeli Premier League | 0 | 0 | 0 | 0 | 1 | 0 | – | – | 0 | 0 | 1 | 0 |
| Hapoel Be'er Sheva | 2016–17 | Israeli Premier League | 0 | 0 | 0 | 0 | 3 | 0 | – | – | 0 | 0 | 3 | 0 |
| Hapoel Be'er Sheva | Total | | 0 | 0 | 0 | 0 | 4 | 0 | – | – | 0 | 0 | 4 | 0 |
| Hapoel Afula | 2016–17 | Liga Leumit | 14 | 0 | 0 | 0 | 0 | 0 | – | – | 0 | 0 | 14 | 0 |
| Hapoel Afula | 2017–18 | Liga Leumit | 34 | 0 | 1 | 0 | 3 | 0 | – | – | 0 | 0 | 38 | 0 |
| Hapoel Afula | 2018–19 | Liga Leumit | 20 | 0 | 3 | 0 | 0 | 0 | – | – | 0 | 0 | 23 | 0 |
| Hapoel Afula | Total | | 68 | 0 | 4 | 0 | 3 | 0 | – | – | 0 | 0 | 75 | 0 |
| Hapoel Kfar Saba | 2019–20 | Israeli Premier League | 16 | 0 | 0 | 0 | 1 | 0 | – | – | 0 | 0 | 17 | 0 |
| Hapoel Kfar Saba | Total | | 16 | 0 | 0 | 0 | 1 | 0 | – | – | 0 | 0 | 17 | 0 |
| Hapoel Be'er Sheva | 2020–21 | Israeli Premier League | 0 | 0 | 0 | 0 | 0 | 0 | – | – | 1 | 0 | 1 | 0 |
| Hapoel Be'er Sheva | Total | | 0 | 0 | 0 | 0 | 0 | 0 | – | – | 1 | 0 | 1 | 0 |
| Hapoel Ra'anana | 2020–21 | Liga Leumit | 12 | 0 | 1 | 0 | 0 | 0 | – | – | 1 | 0 | 14 | 0 |
| Hapoel Ra'anana | Total | | 12 | 0 | 1 | 0 | 0 | 0 | – | – | 1 | 0 | 14 | 0 |
| F.C. Dimona | 2022–23 | Liga Alef | 4 | 0 | 0 | 0 | 0 | 0 | – | – | 0 | 0 | 4 | 0 |
| F.C. Dimona | 2023–24 | Liga Alef | 12 | 0 | 1 | 0 | 0 | 0 | – | – | 0 | 0 | 13 | 0 |
| F.C. Dimona | Total | | 16 | 0 | 1 | 0 | 0 | 0 | – | – | 0 | 0 | 17 | 0 |
| Career total | | | 112 | 0 | 6 | 0 | 8 | 0 | – | – | 2 | 0 | 128 | 0 |

== Honours ==
=== Club ===
Hapoel Beer Sheva

- Israeli Premier League: 2015–16
- Israel Super Cup: 2016
- Toto Cup: 2016-17

Hapoel Afula

- Toto Cup Leumit : 2017–18
