= Roei Gordana =

Israeli footballer (born 1990)

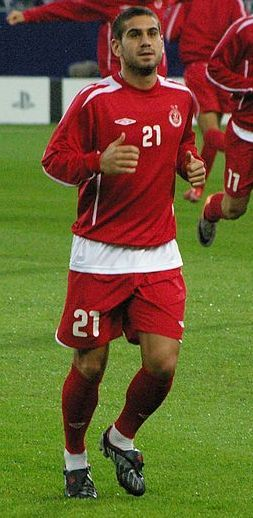

Personal information
- Date of birth: 6 July 1990 (age 36)
- Place of birth: Tel Aviv, Israel
- Height: 1.76 m (5 ft 9 in)
- Position: Central midfielder

Team information
- Current team: F.C. Ashdod
- Number: 8

Youth career
- 1997–2004: Maccabi Tel Aviv
- 2004–2009: Hapoel Tel Aviv

Senior career*
Years	Team	Apps	(Gls)
2007–2014	Hapoel Tel Aviv	71	(4)
2010–2011	→ Hapoel Petah Tikva	14	(0)
2014–2017	Hapoel Be'er Sheva	47	(7)
2016	→ Maccabi Petah Tikva	12	(1)
2017–2018	Bnei Yehuda	38	(6)
2018–2019	Slaven Belupo	16	(3)
2019–2021	F.C. Ashdod	72	(8)
2021–2025	Hapoel Be'er Sheva	98	(4)
2025–	F.C. Ashdod	25	(1)

International career^{‡}
2024–	Israel	1	(0)
- * Club domestic league appearances and goals as of 24 June 2026 ‡ National team caps and goals as of 19:06, 16 March 2025

Roei Gordana (Hebrew: רועי גורדנה; born 6 July 1990) is an Israeli professional footballer who plays for F.C. Ashdod and the Israel national team.

== Early life ==
Gordana was born and raised in Tel Aviv, to an Israeli family of Jewish descent.

== Club career ==
Gordana played on the children system of Bnei Yehuda Tel Aviv and Maccabi Tel Aviv, and at age 14 he moved to the youth system of Hapoel Tel Aviv. On 1 September 2007, at the age of only 17, he made his debut for the senior team, at the game against Hapoel Kfar Saba at Toto Cup competition.

At the start of 2010–11 season, Gordana played 5 games at the Toto Cup, and started at the first game of the season against Hapoel Haifa. In January 2011 on loaned to Hapoel Petah Tikva. At his first game at the club, he scored his debut goal at the 3–1 win against Maccabi Tel Aviv. Gordana played 14 games at Hapoel Petah Tikva.

At the start of 2011–12 season, backed to Hapoel Tel Aviv squad. On 7 January 2012, scored his debut goal at Hapoel Tel Aviv at the win against Hapoel Be'er Sheva in Vasermil Stadium. This season the group promoted to the Group stage of UEFA Europa League. He played 30 league games, scored 2 goals and assisted 2. On 15 May 2012 he assisted the winning goal for Mirko Oremuš at the 2–1 victory against Maccabi Haifa at Israel State Cup final.

On 10 July 2014 he signed for three-year to Hapoel Be'er Sheva. On 17 July 2014 made his debut for the club at the 2014–15 against RNK Split. On 20 September 2014 he scored his debut goal for Be'er Sheva at the 1–3 away win against Hapoel Petah Tikva.

On 28 January 2016 on loaned to Maccabi Petah Tikva until the end of the season and returned to Be'er Sheva after the season.

On 16 January 2017 released from Be'er Sheva and signed to Bnei Yehuda

On 31 January 2019 signed in F.C. Ashdod.

== International career ==
Gordana made his debut for the Israel national team on 8 June 2024 in a 0–3 friendly loss against Hungary at the Nagyerdei Stadion. He substituted Eden Shamir in the 30th minute, the score was already 0–3.

== Honours ==
=== Club ===
Hapoel Tel Aviv

- Premier League (1): 2009–10
- State Cup (2): 2009–10, 2011–12

Maccabi Petah Tikva

- Toto Cup (1): 2015–16

Hapoel Be'er Sheva

- State Cup (2): 2021–22, 2024–25
- Toto Cup (1): 2016-17
- Super Cup (2): 2016, 2022

Bnei Yehuda

- State Cup (1): 2016–17

== See also ==
- List of Jewish footballers
- List of Jews in sports
- List of Israelis
