= Ben Bitton =

Israeli footballer

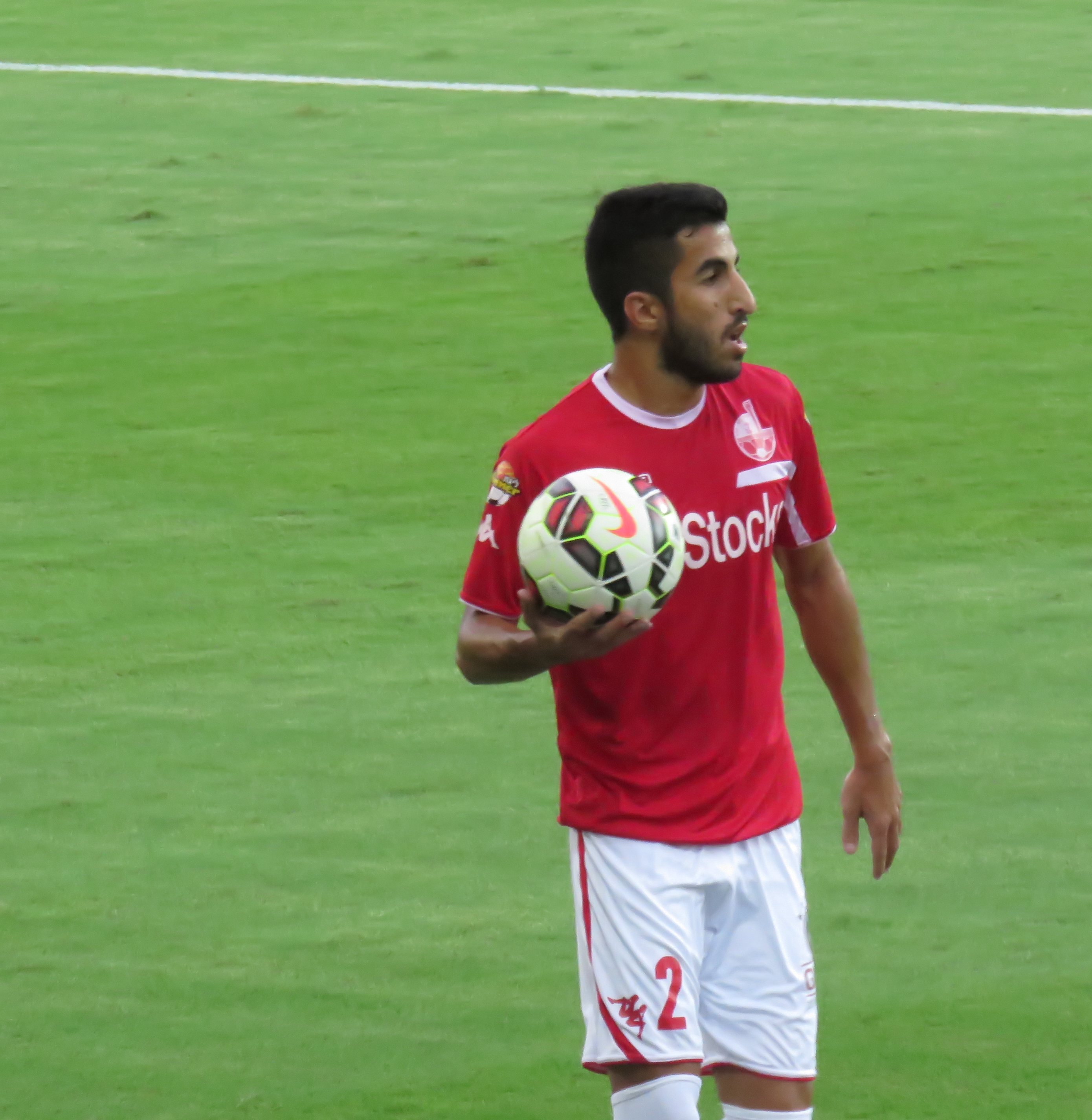
- Bitton playing for Hapoel Be'er Sheva in 2015

Personal information
- Date of birth: 3 January 1991 (age 35)
- Place of birth: Bat Yam, Israel
- Height: 1.79 m (5 ft 10 in)
- Position: Defender

Youth career
- 2003–2010: Hapoel Tel Aviv

Senior career*
Years	Team	Apps	(Gls)
2010–2013	Hapoel Tel Aviv	0	(0)
2010–2012	→ Sektzia Ness Ziona (loan)	65	(0)
2012–2013	→ Hapoel Nazareth Illit (loan)	33	(0)
2013–2021	Hapoel Be'er Sheva	186	(2)
2020–2021	→ Maccabi Tel Aviv (loan)	3	(0)
2021–2023	Hapoel Tel Aviv	67	(3)
2023–2024	Beitar Jerusalem	10	(0)
2024–2025	Hapoel Lod	2	(0)

International career
2009	Israel U19	2	(0)
2016–2018	Israel	5	(0)
- * Club domestic league appearances and goals

Ben Bitton (or Biton, Hebrew: בן ביטון; born 3 January 1991) is an Israeli former association footballer who played as a defender.

== Early life ==
Bitton was born in Bat Yam, Israel, to a family of Sephardic Jewish descent.

== Club career ==
=== Sektzia Ness Ziona ===
Bitton began his career in the youth system of Hapoel Tel Aviv. In August 2010, loaned to Sektzia Ness Ziona, in order to gain playing time. On 7 August 2014, he made his debut in 2–1 victory against Hapoel Bnei Lod at the group stage of the Toto Cup.

=== Hapoel Nazareth Illit ===
After his loan period ended, he was loaned to Hapoel Nazareth Illit. He made his debut on 3 September 2012 in a 2–2 draw against Hapoel Ra'anana. On 4 February 2013, he received a red card for a first time at career against Hapoel Rishon LeZion.

=== Hapoel Be'er Sheva ===
After his loan period ended, he was released from Hapoel Tel Aviv and On 27 June 2013 signed to Hapoel Be'er Sheva, with his teammate Ben Turjeman. On 30 September 2013, he made his debut in a 2–1 league victory against Bnei Yehuda Tel Aviv. Bitton was part of a successful season for Be'er Sheva, who finished the season in 2nd place.

On 17 July 2014, he made his debut in the European Competition, in the 2–1 loss against RNK Split at UEFA Europa League qualifying. On 2 December 2014, he scored his debut career goal at the 1–1 draw against Hapoel Ironi Kiryat Shmona.

=== Maccabi Tel Aviv ===
On 2 August 2020, Bitton joined Maccabi Tel Aviv on loan.

== International career ==
On 25 March 2016, Bitton made his debut for Israel national team against Croatia.

== Career statistics ==
As of 1 June 2023

Appearances and goals by club, season and competition
Club	Season	League			Israel State Cup		Toto Cup		Europe		Other		Total	
Club	Season	Division	Apps	Goals	Apps	Goals	Apps	Goals	Apps	Goals	Apps	Goals	Apps	Goals
Sektzia Ness Ziona	2010–11	Liga Leumit	33	0	3	0	9	0	0	0	0	0	45	0
Sektzia Ness Ziona	2011–12	Liga Leumit	32	0	2	0	5	0	0	0	0	0	39	0
Sektzia Ness Ziona	Total		65	0	5	0	14	0	0	0	0	0	84	0
Hapoel Nazareth Illit	2012–13	Liga Leumit	33	0	2	0	1	0	0	0	0	0	36	0
Hapoel Nazareth Illit	Total		33	0	2	0	1	0	0	0	0	0	36	0
Hapoel Be'er Sheva	2013–14	Israeli Premier League	19	0	2	0	0	0	0	0	0	0	21	0
Hapoel Be'er Sheva	2014–15	Israeli Premier League	30	1	3	0	3	0	2	0	0	0	38	1
Hapoel Be'er Sheva	2015–16	Israeli Premier League	29	0	4	0	3	0	2	0	0	0	38	0
Hapoel Be'er Sheva	2016–17	Israeli Premier League	33	1	1	0	4	0	13	0	1	0	52	1
Hapoel Be'er Sheva	2017–18	Israeli Premier League	20	0	3	0	1	0	8	0	1	0	33	0
Hapoel Be'er Sheva	2018–19	Israeli Premier League	24	0	2	0	0	0	6	0	1	0	33	0
Hapoel Be'er Sheva	2019–20	Israeli Premier League	31	0	3	0	0	0	8	0	0	0	42	0
Hapoel Be'er Sheva	Total		186	2	18	0	11	0	39	0	3	0	257	2
Maccabi Tel Aviv	2020–21	Israeli Premier League	3	0	0	0	1	0	2	0	1	0	7	0
Maccabi Tel Aviv	Total		3	0	0	0	1	0	2	0	1	0	7	0
Hapoel Tel Aviv	2020–21	Israeli Premier League	15	1	3	1	0	0	0	0	0	0	18	2
Hapoel Tel Aviv	2021–22	Israeli Premier League	30	2	1	0	5	0	0	0	0	0	36	2
Hapoel Tel Aviv	2022–23	Israeli Premier League	22	0	4	0	0	0	0	0	0	0	26	0
Hapoel Tel Aviv	Total		67	5	8	1	5	0	0	0	0	0	80	4
Beitar Jerusalem	2023–24	Israeli Premier League	0	0	0	0	0	0	0	0	0	0	0	0
Beitar Jerusalem	Total		0	0	0	0	0	0	0	0	0	0	0	0
Career total			354	8	33	1	32	0	41	0	4	0	464	6

== Honours ==
Hapoel Be'er Sheva

- Israeli Premier League: 2015–16, 2016–17, 2017–18
- Israel State Cup: 2019–20
- Israel Super Cup: 2016, 2017
- Toto Cup Al: 2016–17

Maccabi Tel Aviv

- Israel Super Cup: 2020

== See also ==
- List of Jewish footballers
- List of Jews in sports
- List of Israelis
