= Matan Ohayon =

Israeli footballer

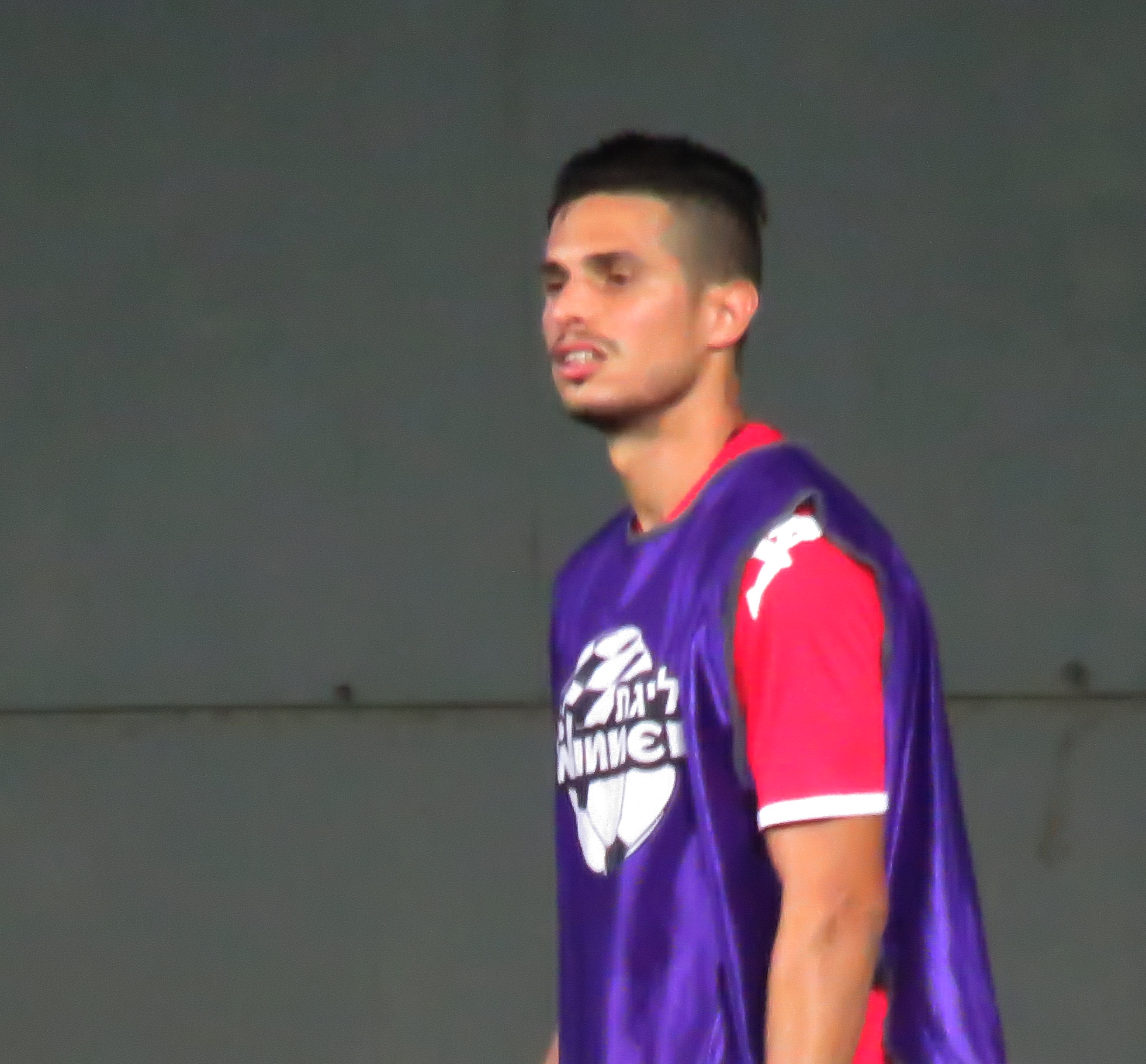
- Ohayon with Hapoel Be'er Sheva in 2015

Personal information
- Full name: Matan Ohayon
- Date of birth: 25 February 1986 (age 40)
- Place of birth: Ashdod, Israel
- Height: 1.81 m (5 ft 11 1/2 in)
- Position: Full back

Youth career
- F.C. Ashdod

Senior career*
| Years | Team | Apps | (Gls) |
| 2004–2010 | F.C. Ashdod | 61 | (0) |
| 2004–2005 | → Ironi Rishon LeZion (loan) | | |
| 2006–2007 | → Sektzia Ness Ziona (loan) | 19 | (0) |
| 2007–2008 | → Hapoel Ironi Rishon LeZion (loan) | 31 | (1) |
| 2011–2013 | Charleroi | 35 | (0) |
| 2012 | → Maccabi Petah Tikva (loan) | 11 | (0) |
| 2013–2014 | Ironi Kiryat Shmona | 25 | (0) |
| 2014–2015 | Maccabi Haifa | 9 | (0) |
| 2015 | Hapoel Tel Aviv | 15 | (1) |
| 2015–2019 | Hapoel Be'er Sheva | 44 | (1) |
| 2020–2021 | Hapoel Ra'anana | 28 | (0) |
- * Club domestic league appearances and goals

Matan Ohayon (Hebrew: מתן אוחיון) is a retired Israeli footballer who has played for Hapoel Ra'anana.

== Honours ==
=== Club ===
Hapoel Ironi Kiryat Shmona

- Israel State Cup (1): 2013–14

Hapoel Be'er Sheva

- Israeli Premier League (3): 2015–16, 2016-17, 2017-18
- Israel Super Cup (2): 2016, 2017
- Toto Cup (1): 2016–17
