= David Goresh =

Israeli footballer

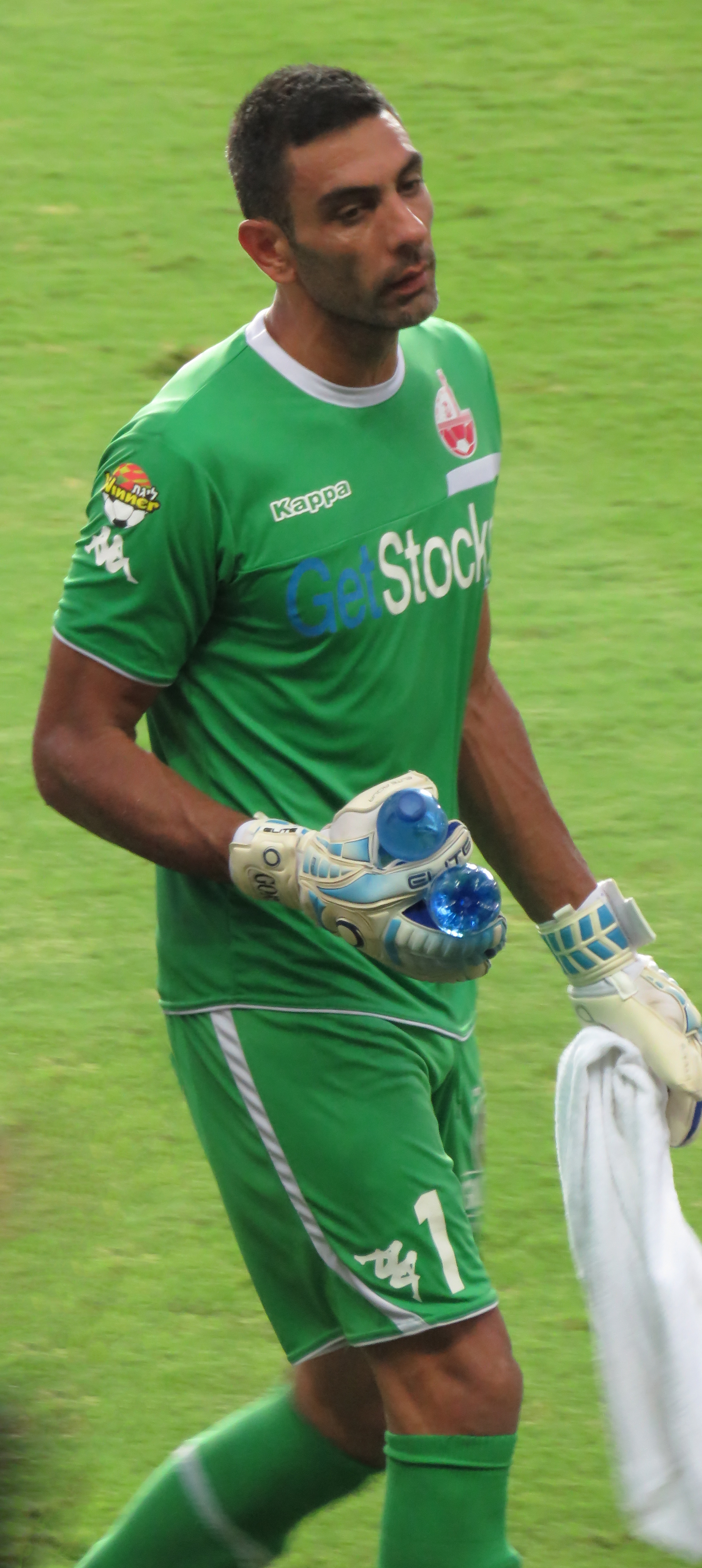
- Goresh playing for Hapoel Be'er Sheva in 2015

Personal information
- Full name: David Goresh
- Date of birth: 1 February 1980 (age 46)
- Place of birth: Acre, Israel, Israel
- Height: 1.89 m (6 ft 2 1/2 in)
- Position: Goalkeeper

Youth career
- Hapoel Acre

Senior career*
| Years | Team | Apps | (Gls) |
| 1998–1999 | Hapoel Acre | | |
| 1999–2001 | Maccabi Petah Tikva | 0 | (0) |
| 2001–2015 | Hapoel Acre | 317 | (0) |
| 2015–2018 | Hapoel Be'er Sheva | 68 | (0) |
| 2018–2019 | Beitar Jerusalem | 7 | (0) |

International career
| 2016–2017 | Israel | 7 | (0) |
- * Club domestic league appearances and goals

David "Dudu" Goresh (Hebrew: דוד "דודו" גורש; born 1 February 1980) is an Israeli retired footballer.

== Honours ==
=== Club ===
Hapoel Be'er Sheva

- Israeli Premier League (3): 2015–16, 2016-17, 2017-18
- Israel Super Cup (2): 2016, 2017
- Toto Cup (1): 2016–17
