= Maor Melikson =

Israeli footballer

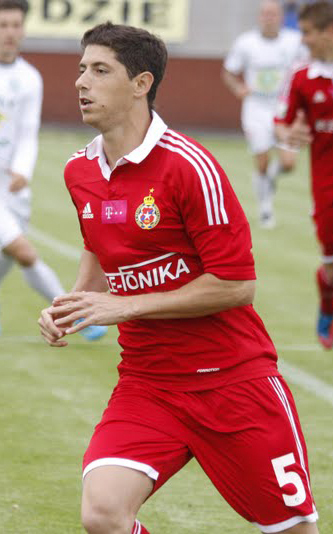
- Melikson playing for Wisła Kraków in 2012

Personal information
- Date of birth: 30 October 1984 (age 42)
- Place of birth: Yavne, Israel
- Height: 1.75 m (5 ft 9 in)
- Position: Winger

Youth career
- Maccabi Yavne

Senior career*
Years	Team	Apps	(Gls)
2001–2002	Maccabi Yavne		
2002–2006	Beitar Jerusalem	111	(8)
2006–2008	Maccabi Haifa	24	(1)
2008	Hapoel Kfar Saba	15	(0)
2008–2011	Hapoel Be'er Sheva	77	(19)
2011–2013	Wisła Kraków	46	(6)
2013–2014	Valenciennes	52	(4)
2014–2020	Hapoel Be'er Sheva	153	(23)

International career
2002–2003	Israel U19	8	(1)
2003–2007	Israel U21	17	(2)
2010–2018	Israel	26	(3)
- * Club domestic league appearances and goals

Maor Melikson (or Melicsohn, Hebrew: מאור מליקסון; born 30 October 1984) is an Israeli former professional association footballer who played as a winger. As a result of injury, he announced his retirement on 1 January 2020.

== Early life ==
Melikson was born in Yavne, Israel, to Ashkenazi Jewish parents. His father was born in Romania, whereas his mother was born in Legnica, Poland, and both immigrated to Israel separately at young age.

He also holds a Polish passport, on account of his mother's birthplace.

== Club career ==
=== Israel ===
Born in Yavne, Melikson started in the youth department of Maccabi Yavne. During the 2001–02 season, he made his senior debut in Liga Alef in a match against Ironi Ramat HaSharon. At the end of that season Maccabi Yavne were relegated to Liga Bet, and Melikson moved to Beitar Jerusalem. At the end of 2005–06 season after not reaching a financial settlement with Beitar, Melikson decided to join Ligat ha'Al champions, Maccabi Haifa on a three-year contract. During the 2007–08 season, Maccabi Haifa sold Melikson to Hapoel Kfar Saba. After just six months which included a relegation to Liga Leumit, he signed in June 2008 a five-year contract with Hapoel Be'er Sheva, and later was appointed as the team captain.

=== Wisła Kraków ===
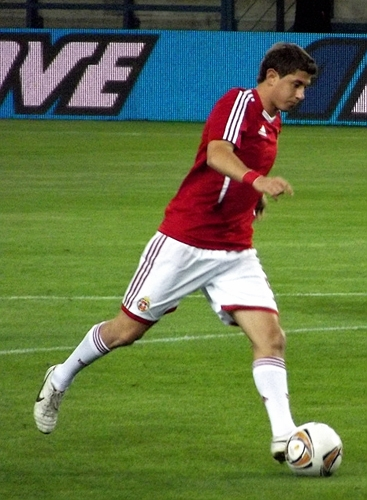
Melikson with Wisła Kraków

On 31 January 2011, Melikson joined Polish Ekstraklasa side Wisła Kraków on a four-and-a-half-year deal for an undisclosed fee from Hapoel Be'er Sheva. He won the Ekstraklasa championship in his debut season. He was also named the Ekstraklasa Revelation of the Season, even though he only played for one half of the season. On 27 July, Melikson scored his first goal in European Cups in the first leg of a UEFA Champions League third qualifying round match against Litex Lovech, giving a vital 2–1 win to Wisła. Melikson scored again twice in the second leg and helped Wisła secure qualification for the play-off round, where they eventually lost to APOEL. He picked up an injury in September's league match against Ruch Chorzów, which ruled him out of play until December. Melikson returned to play the last two UEFA Europa League group stage matches and helped his team to qualify for the round of 32. He was chosen the biggest discovery of Ekstraklasa by other players in Polish Footballers' Association voting, as well as named to the Ekstraklasa Best XI in 2011.

=== Valenciennes ===
On 15 January 2013, Melikson joined Ligue 1 club Valenciennes on a two-and-a-half-year deal for an undisclosed fee from Wisła Kraków. He made his debut on 25 January in a 2–0 loss against Lyon, coming on as a substitute in the second half.

=== Return to Beer Sheva ===
On 10 July 2014, it was announced that Melikson would return to Beer Sheva.

== International career ==
Melikson played in Israel national under-21 football team for several years, and helped the team qualify for the 2007 UEFA Under-21 Championship, but missed out on the final tournament due to injury.

He made his debut for the Israeli senior national team in a friendly match against Uruguay on 26 May 2010. On 10 August 2011, in his second appearance for the national side Melikson scored two goals for Israel in the 4–3 loss against Ivory Coast.

On 20 September 2011, the Polish Football Association chairman Grzegorz Lato revealed that Melikson expressed his desire to play for the Poland national team in a conversation with him. Melikson was eligible to play for Poland based on a FIFA ruling allowing players to switch their national teams if the player had not yet played in an official FIFA competitive match with the senior team despite having played at the youth level. The next day, Israel Football Association issued a statement that Melikson was a member of Israel national team, and he was called up for the upcoming match against Malta in the last fixture of the UEFA Euro 2012 qualifying phase. Melikson refrained from making any comment to the Polish media, but Wisła Kraków manager Robert Maaskant confirmed his intentions to switch to Poland national team. Later, Melikson said to Israeli media that he chose to play for Poland, but subsequently on 22 September declared that he has decided not to play for either national side for the time being. In January 2012, Melikson met with the new coach of Israel national team, Eli Guttman, and declared his desire to continue playing for Israel.

In his first appearance in 2012, Melikson assisted Ben Sahar's goals in a 3–2 home loss to Ukraine in a friendly match.

== Career statistics ==
=== Club ===
Appearances and goals by club, season and competition
Club	Season	League			National cup (Note: Includes Israel State Cup, Polish Cup, Coupe de France)		League cup (Note: Includes Toto Cup, Coupe de la Ligue)		Europe		Other		Total		Ref.
Club	Season	Division	Apps	Goals	Apps	Goals	Apps	Goals	Apps	Goals	Apps	Goals	Apps	Goals	Ref.
Beitar Jerusalem	2002–03	Israeli Premier League	27	3	0	0	5	0	0	0	0	0	32	3	
Beitar Jerusalem	2003–04	Israeli Premier League	26	2	0	0	7	0	0	0	0	0	33	2	
Beitar Jerusalem	2004–05	Israeli Premier League	29	1	0	0	7	1	0	0	0	0	36	2	
Beitar Jerusalem	2005–06	Israeli Premier League	29	2	0	0	7	1	3 (Note: Appearances in UEFA Intertoto Cup)	0	0	0	39	3	
Beitar Jerusalem	Total		111	8	0	0	26	2	3	0	0	0	140	10	–
Maccabi Haifa	2006–07	Israeli Premier League	18	1	0	0	6	0	9 (Note: Two appearances in UEFA Champions League, seven appearances in UEFA Cup)	0	0	0	33	1	
Maccabi Haifa	2007–08	Israeli Premier League	6	0	0	0	9	1	0	0	0	0	15	1	
Maccabi Haifa	Total		24	1	0	0	15	1	9	0	0	0	48	2	–
Hapoel Kfar Saba	2007–08	Israeli Premier League	15	0	3	2	0	0	0	0	0	0	18	2	
Hapoel Be'er Sheva	2008–09	Liga Leumit	28	5	1	0	10	3	—		0	0	49	8	
Hapoel Be'er Sheva	2009–10	Israeli Premier League	30	10	2	2	4	2	—		0	0	36	14	
Hapoel Be'er Sheva	2010–11	Israeli Premier League	19	4	0	0	4	0	—		0	0	23	4	
Hapoel Be'er Sheva	Total		77	19	3	2	18	5	—		0	0	98	26	–
Wisła Kraków	2010–11	Ekstraklasa	15	4	2	0	—		—		—		17	4	
Wisła Kraków	2011–12	Ekstraklasa	18	1	3	1	—		11 (Note: Six appearances and three goals in UEFA Champions League, five appearances in UEFA Europa League)	3	—		32	5	
Wisła Kraków	2012–13	Ekstraklasa	13	1	2	0	—		—		—		15	1	
Wisła Kraków	Total		46	6	7	1	—		11	3	—		64	10	–
Valenciennes	2012–13	Ligue 1	16	2	0	0	0	0	—		0	0	16	2	
Valenciennes	2013–14	Ligue 1	36	2	1	0	1	0	—		0	0	38	2	
Valenciennes	Total		52	4	1	0	1	0	—		0	0	54	4	–
Hapoel Be'er Sheva	2014–15	Israeli Premier League	30	3	6	2	1	0	2 (Note: Appearances in UEFA Europa League)	0	0	0	39	5	
Hapoel Be'er Sheva	2015–16	Israeli Premier League	30	7	3	0	6	0	2	0	0	0	41	7	
Hapoel Be'er Sheva	2016–17	Israeli Premier League	25	5	2	2	2	0	12 (Note: Six appearances and one goal in UEFA Champions League, six appearances in UEFA Europa League)	1	1 (Note: Appearance in Israel Super Cup)	0	42	8	
Hapoel Be'er Sheva	2017–18	Israeli Premier League	33	5	3	1	2	1	12 (Note: Six appearances in UEFA Champions League, six appearances in UEFA Europa League)	0	1	0	51	7	
Hapoel Be'er Sheva	2018–19	Israeli Premier League	33	3	2	0	1	0	6 (Note: Four appearances and one goal in UEFA Champions League, two appearances in UEFA Europa League)	1	1	0	43	4	
Hapoel Be'er Sheva	2019–20	Israeli Premier League	2	0	1	0	0	0	0	0	0	0	3	0	
Hapoel Be'er Sheva	Total		155	23	17	5	12	1	34	2	3	0	219	31	–
Career total			480	61	31	10	72	9	57	5	3	0	641	85	–

=== International ===
Appearances and goals by national team and year
National team	Year	Apps	Goals
Israel
Israel	2010	1	0
Israel	2011	1	2
Israel	2012	7	1
Israel	2013	8	0
Israel	2014	1	0
Israel	2015	2	0
Israel	2016	1	0
Israel	2017	4	0
Israel	2018	1	0
Total		26	3

Scores and results list Israel's goal tally first, score column indicates score after each Melikson goal.

List of international goals scored by Maor Melikson
No.	Date	Venue	Opponent	Score	Result	Competition
1	10 August 2011	Stade de Genève, Geneva	Ivory Coast	2–3	3–4	Friendly
2	10 August 2011	Stade de Genève, Geneva	Ivory Coast	3–4	3–4	Friendly
3	12 October 2012	Stade Josy Barthel, City of Luxembourg	Luxembourg	4–0	6–0	2014 World Cup qualifying

== Honours ==
Hapoel Be'er Sheva

- Israeli Premier League: 2015–16, 2016-17, 2017-18
- Toto Cup Second League: 2008–09
- State Cup runner-up: 2014–15
- Israel Super Cup: 2016, 2017

Wisła Kraków

- Ekstraklasa: 2010–11

Individual

- Ekstraklasa Discovery of the Season: 2010–11
- Ekstraklasa Best XI: 2011, 2012
