= Ovidiu Hoban =

Romanian footballer

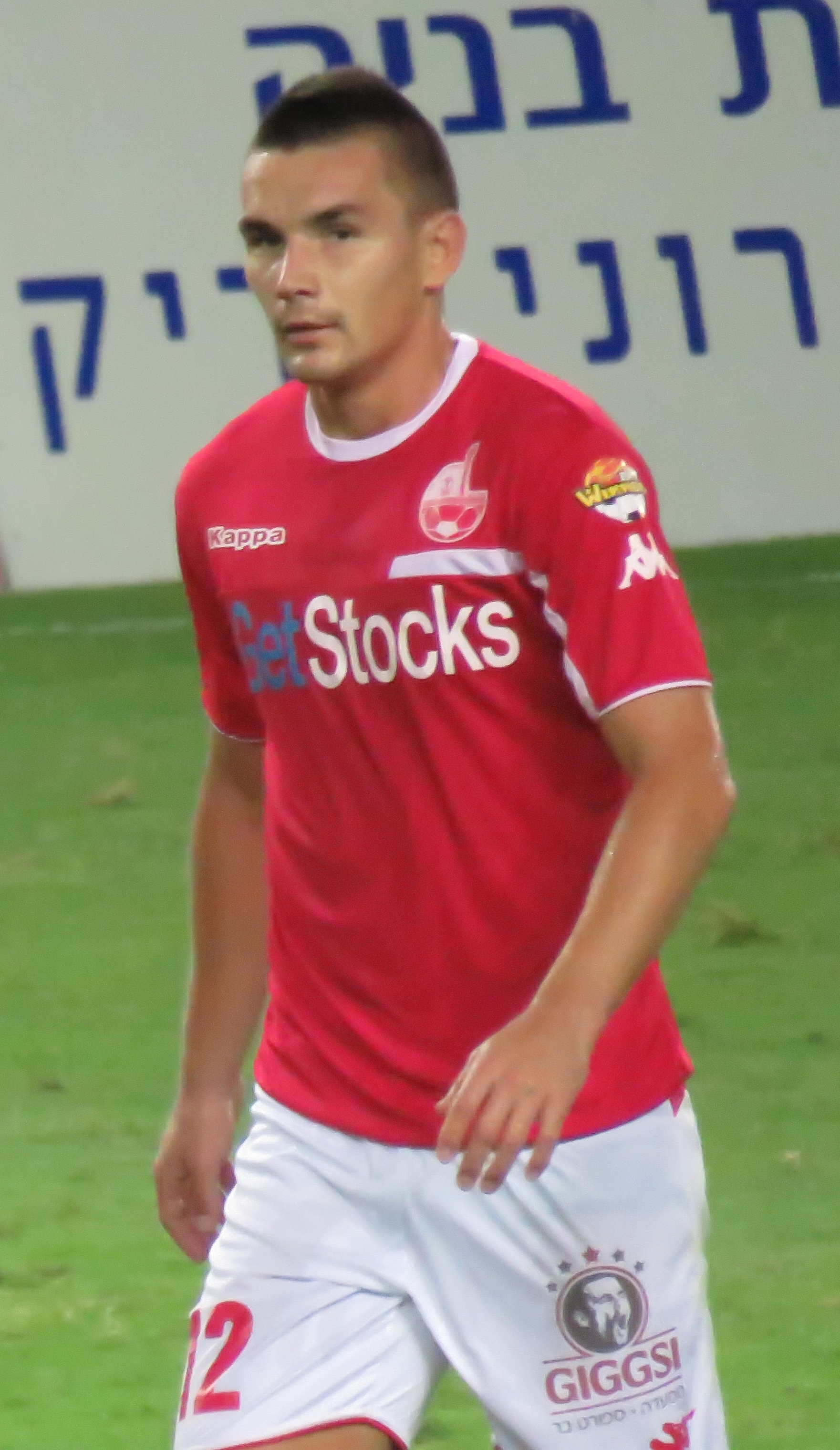
- Hoban playing for Hapoel Be'er Sheva in 2015

Personal information
- Full name: Ovidiu Ștefan Hoban
- Date of birth: 27 December 1982 (age 43)
- Place of birth: Baia Mare, Romania
- Height: 1.82 m (5 ft 11 1/2 in)
- Position: Defensive midfielder

Team information
- Current team: CFR Cluj U17 (head coach)

Youth career
- 1992–1998: Maramureș Baia Mare
- 1998–2002: Bihor Oradea

Senior career*
Years	Team	Apps	(Gls)
2002–2004	FK Clausen	89	(7)
2004	Universitatea Craiova	1	(0)
2005	FC Oradea	6	(0)
2005–2011	Gaz Metan Mediaș	195	(13)
2012	Universitatea Cluj	14	(0)
2012–2014	Petrolul Ploiești	57	(4)
2014–2017	Hapoel Be'er Sheva	91	(7)
2017–2023	CFR Cluj	127	(7)
Total		580	(38)

International career
2013–2017	Romania	30	(1)

Managerial career
- 2023–2024: CFR Cluj U16
- 2024: CFR Cluj U18
- 2024: CFR Cluj (caretaker)
- 2024–2026: CFR Cluj (assistant)
- 2025: CFR Cluj (caretaker)
- 2026–: CFR Cluj U17
- * Club domestic league appearances and goals

Ovidiu Ștefan Hoban (born 27 December 1982) is a Romanian professional football manager and former player, who played as a defensive midfielder, currently head coach at CFR Cluj U17.

== International career ==
Hoban made his international debut against Trinidad & Tobago, playing the second half of a friendly game on 4 June 2013. He scored his first international goal during the UEFA Euro 2016 qualifying against Finland in an eventual 1–1 draw. He was selected in the 23-man squad for UEFA Euro 2016 and started in Romania's opening match against France before being used as a substitute in their following game against Switzerland. He started in their final match against Albania which they lost 1-0 and were eliminated from the tournament.

== Career statistics ==
=== Club ===
Appearances and goals by club, season and competition
Club	Season	League			National cup (Note: Includes Cupa României, Israel State Cup)		League cup (Note: Includes Cupa Ligii, Toto Cup)		Continental		Other		Total	
Club	Season	Division	Apps	Goals	Apps	Goals	Apps	Goals	Apps	Goals	Apps	Goals	Apps	Goals
FK Clausen	2001–02	Verbandsliga Südwest	?	?	?	?	—		—		—		?	?
FK Clausen	2002–03	Verbandsliga Südwest	?	?	?	?	—		—		—		?	?
FK Clausen	2003–04	Verbandsliga Südwest	?	?	?	?	—		—		—		?	?
FK Clausen	Total		89	7	?	?	—		—		—		89	7
Universitatea Craiova	2004–05	Divizia A	1	0	0	0	—		—		—		1	0
FC Oradea	2004–05	Divizia B	6	0	—		—		—		—		6	0
Gaz Metan Mediaș	2005–06	Divizia B	22	1	1	0	—		—		—		23	1
Gaz Metan Mediaș	2006–07	Liga II	32	3	0	0	—		—		—		32	3
Gaz Metan Mediaș	2007–08	Liga II	29	3	0	0	—		–		—		29	3
Gaz Metan Mediaș	2008–09	Liga I	34	1	1	0	—		–		—		35	1
Gaz Metan Mediaș	2009–10	Liga I	32	3	1	0	—		–		—		33	3
Gaz Metan Mediaș	2010–11	Liga I	31	0	0	0	—		–		—		31	0
Gaz Metan Mediaș	2011–12	Liga I	15	2	1	0	—		6 (Note: Appearances in UEFA Europa League)	2	—		22	3
Gaz Metan Mediaș	Total		195	13	3	0	—		6	2	—		204	15
Universitatea Cluj	2011–12	Liga I	14	0	—		—		—		—		14	0
Petrolul Ploiești	2012–13	Liga I	24	3	5	0	—		—		—		29	3
Petrolul Ploiești	2013–14	Liga I	29	1	4	1	—		6	0	1 (Note: Appearances in Supercupa României)	0	40	2
Petrolul Ploiești	2014–15	Liga I	4	0	–		1	0	6	0	—		11	0
Petrolul Ploiești	Total		57	4	9	1	1	0	12	0	1	0	80	5
Hapoel Be'er Sheva	2014–15	Israeli Premier League	33	1	5	1	—		—		—		38	2
Hapoel Be'er Sheva	2015–16	Israeli Premier League	34	4	5	0	3	3	2	1	—		44	8
Hapoel Be'er Sheva	2016–17	Israeli Premier League	24	2	1	0	1	1	13 (Note: Five appearances and one goal in UEFA Champions League, eight appearances in UEFA Europa League)	1	1 (Note: Appearance in Israel Super Cup)	0	35	4
Hapoel Be'er Sheva	Total		91	7	11	1	4	4	15	2	1	0	122	14
CFR Cluj	2017–18	Liga I	34	3	0	0	—		—		—		34	3
CFR Cluj	2018–19	Liga I	12	1	4	0	—		5 (Note: Two appearances in UEFA Champions League, three appearances and one goal in UEFA Europa League)	1	1	0	22	2
CFR Cluj	2019–20	Liga I	27	1	0	0	—		8 (Note: Four appearances in UEFA Champions League, four appearances in UEFA Europa League)	0	0	0	35	1
CFR Cluj	2020–21	Liga I	28	1	0	0	—		7 (Note: One appearance in UEFA Champions League, six appearances in UEFA Europa League)	0	1	0	36	1
CFR Cluj	2021–22	Liga I	4	0	1	0	—		2 (Note: Appearances in UEFA Champions League)	0	0	0	7	0
CFR Cluj	2022–23	Liga I	22	1	4	1	—		6 (Note: Appearances in UEFA Conference League)	0	2 (Note: One appearance in Supercupa României, one appearance in Liga I European play-offs)	0	34	2
CFR Cluj	Total		127	7	9	1	—		28	1	4	0	168	9
Career total			580	38	32	3	5	4	61	5	6	0	684	50

=== International ===
Appearances and goals by national team and year
National team	Year	Apps	Goals
Romania	2013	6	0
Romania	2014	5	0
Romania	2015	5	1
Romania	2016	11	0
Romania	2017	3	0
Total		30	1

Scores and results list Romania's goal tally first, score column indicates score after each Hoban goal.

List of international goals scored by Ovidiu Hoban
No.	Date	Venue	Opponent	Score	Result	Competition
1	8 October 2015	Arena Națională, Bucharest, Romania	Finland	1–1	1–1	UEFA Euro 2016 qualifying

== Honours ==
Petrolul Ploiești

- Cupa României: 2012–13
- Supercupa României runner-up: 2013

Hapoel Be'er Sheva

- Israeli Premier League: 2015–16, 2016–17
- Toto Cup: 2016–17
- Israel Super Cup: 2016

CFR Cluj

- Liga I: 2017–18, 2018–19, 2019–20, 2020–21, 2021–22
- Supercupa României: 2018, 2020
