= Lúcio Maranhão =

Brazilian footballer (born 1988)

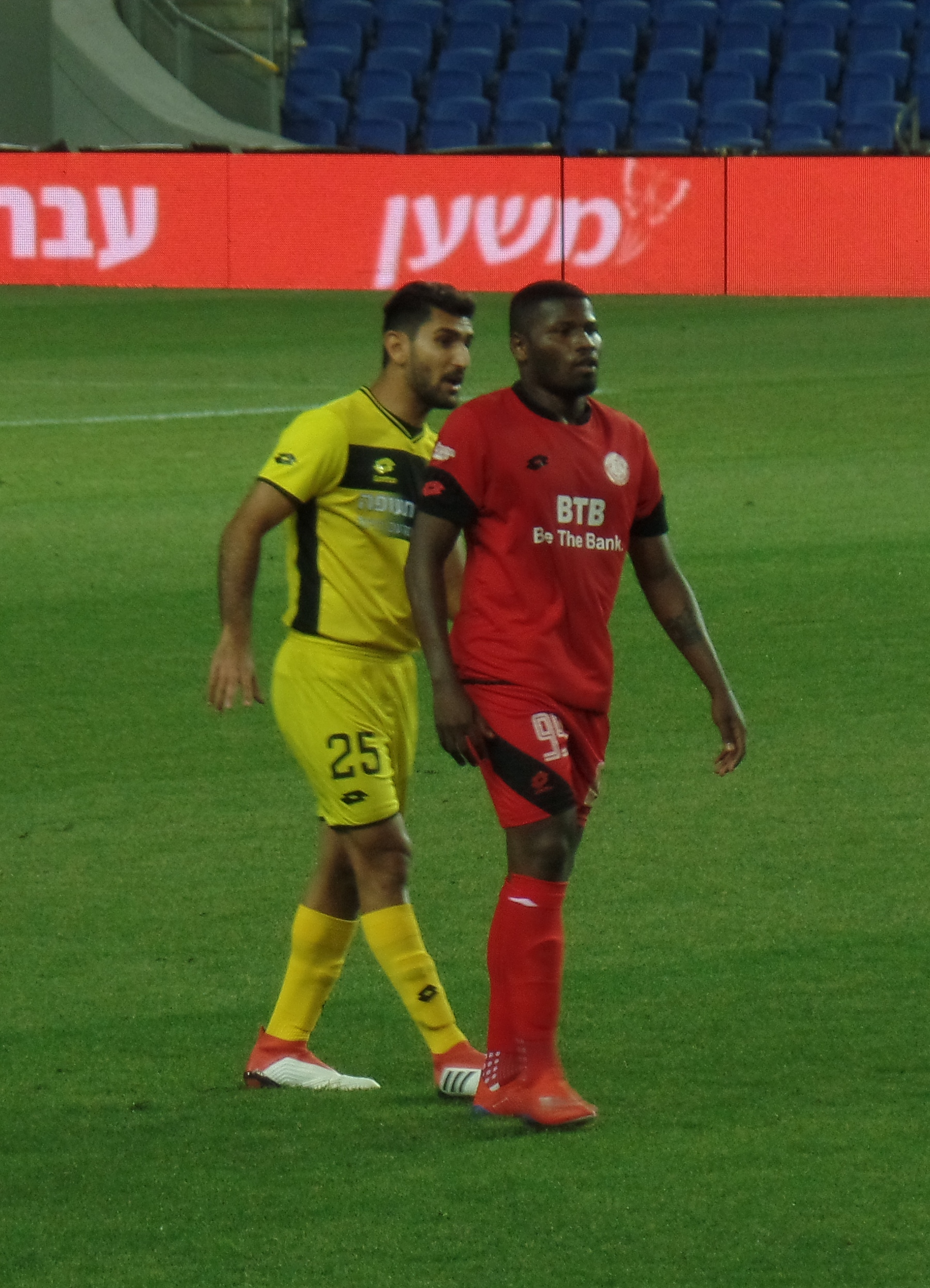

Personal information
- Full name: Lucielmo Palhano Soares
- Date of birth: 28 September 1988 (age 38)
- Place of birth: São Luís, Maranhão, Brazil
- Height: 1.88 m (6 ft 2 in)
- Position: Forward

Team information
- Current team: Oeste

Youth career
- 2000–2010: Maranhão
- 2010–2011: Horizonte

Senior career*
Years	Team	Apps	(Gls)
2011	Horizonte	4	(1)
2012–2014	ASA de Arapiraca	65	(31)
2013	→ Vitória (loan)	5	(0)
2014	→ Figueirense (loan)	16	(5)
2014	Buriram United	7	(2)
2015	Fortaleza	37	(7)
2016	CRB	35	(13)
2016–2017	Hapoel Be'er Sheva	11	(3)
2017	→ Ashdod (loan)	13	(0)
2017	Elazığspor	6	(1)
2017–2018	Arouca	7	(2)
2018–2020	Hapoel Hadera	64	(20)
2020–2021	Ironi Kiryat Shmona	33	(8)
2021	Hapoel Tel Aviv	7	(0)
2021–2022	Bnei Yehuda	9	(0)
2022	América de Natal	9	(0)
2023	ASA de Arapiraca	25	(5)
2023–	Oeste	0	(0)
- * Club domestic league appearances and goals as of 27 May 2023

Lucielmo Palhano Soares (born 28 September 1988), also known as Lúcio Maranhão, is a Brazilian professional footballer who plays for Oeste as a forward.

== Career ==
Born in São Luís, Maranhão, Brazil, Lúcio started his career with local club Maranhão. In 2010 moved to the youth department of Horizonte debut where he went on to make his senior debut.

In 2012 Lúcio signed for ASA de Arapiraca. He was loaned out to Vitória and Figueirense in 2013 and 2014 respectively.

Before his loan spell with Figueirense ended, Lúcio signed for Thai Premier League club Buriram United for £100,000.

In early 2015 he returned to Brazil and signed moved to Fortaleza for the season. The following season, he signed for CRB.

On 17 July 2016, Lúcio signed with Hapoel Be'er Sheva for three years. On 30 July, he made his first appearance in a 5–0 victory over Hapoel Ashkelon as part of the Toto Cup, During the game he scored the first goal. On 3 August, he made an appearance in UEFA Champions League qualification against Olympiacos. On 11 August he won the Super Cup with Hapoel Beer Sheva after beating cup holders Maccabi Haifa 4–2. Later in the season he won the Toto Cup with Be'er Sheva. In January's transfer window, Lúcio was loaned to the F.C. Ashdod until the end of the season.

On 16 July 2017, after being released by Be'er Sheva, he signed for Elazığspor.

On 23 July 2021, Lúcio signed for Hapoel Tel Aviv.

== Honours ==
Buriram United

- Thai League T1: 2014

Figueirense

- Campeonato Catarinense: 2014

Fortaleza

- Campeonato Cearense: 2015

CRB

- Campeonato Alagoano: 2016

Hapoel Beer Sheva

- Toto Cup: 2016–17
- Israel Super Cup: 2016
