= Yuval Shabtay =

Israeli footballer

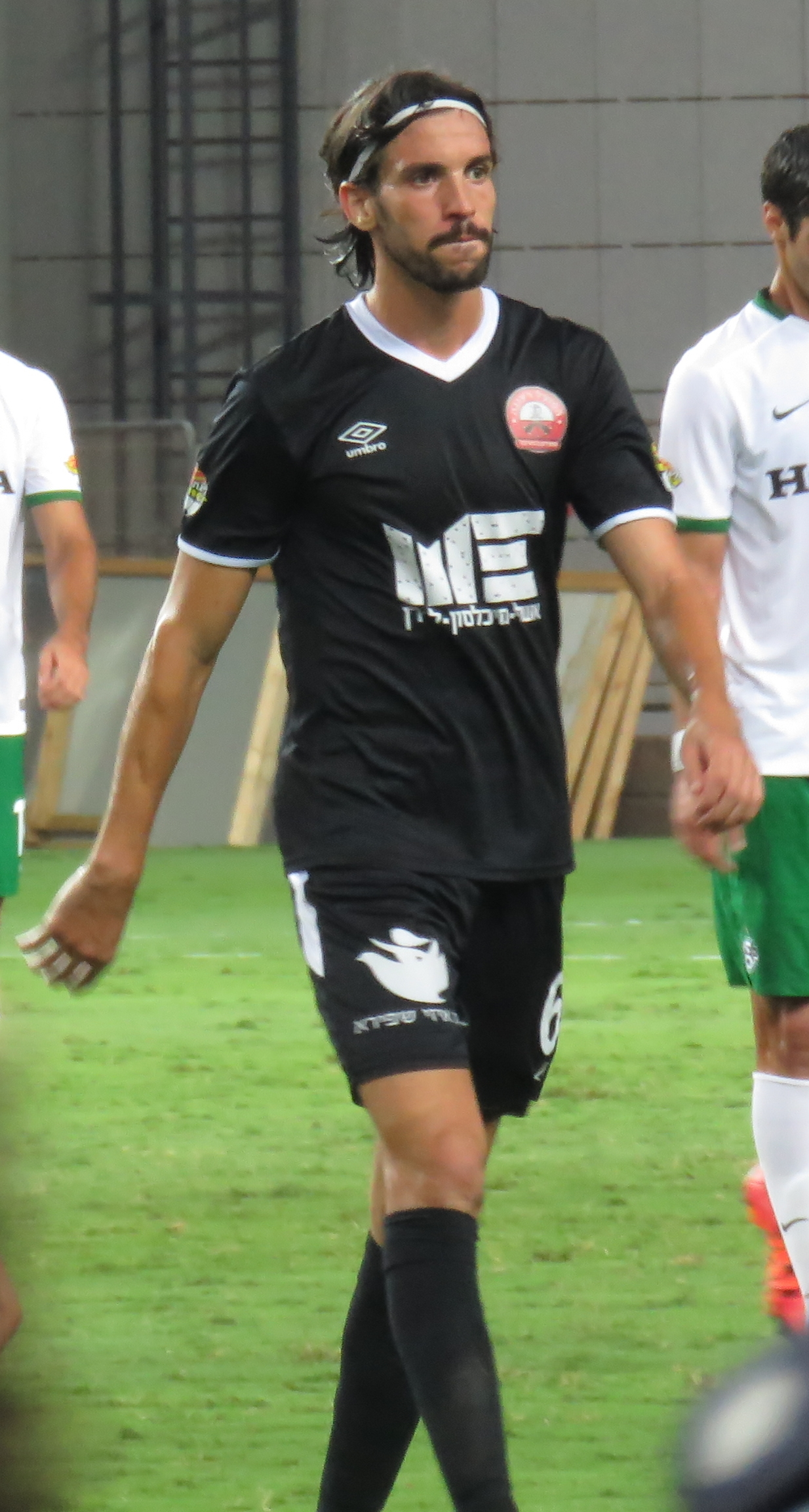
- Shabtay playing for Hapoel Ra'anana, October 2015

Personal information
- Full name: Yuval Shabtay
- Date of birth: December 18, 1986 (age 39)
- Place of birth: Karmiel, Israel
- Height: 1.85 m (6 ft 1 in)
- Positions: Defensive midfielder; left back

Youth career
- Ironi Kiryat Shmona

Senior career*
Years	Team	Apps	(Gls)
2006–2010	Ironi Kiryat Shmona	27	(2)
2006–2008	→ Maccabi Kiryat Ata (loan)	?	(?)
2010–2011	Maccabi Ahi Nazareth	32	(6)
2011–2014	Hapoel Acre	91	(7)
2014–2015	Hapoel Haifa	30	(0)
2015–2016	Hapoel Ra'anana	33	(4)
2016–2017	Hapoel Be'er Sheva	11	(0)
2017	Hapoel Ra'anana	14	(1)
2017–2019	Maccabi Petah Tikva	26	(0)
2019–2021	Maccabi Ahi Nazareth	53	(0)
2021	Maccabi Tamra	6	(1)
2021–2022	Hapoel Karmiel	49	(13)
- * Club domestic league appearances and goals

Yuval Shabtay (Hebrew: יובל שבתאי) is a retired Israeli footballer who plays as Midfielder.

== Honours ==
=== Club ===
Hapoel Be'er Sheva

- Israel Super Cup (1): 2016
- Toto Cup (1): 2016-17
