= Loai Taha =

Israeli footballer

Personal information
- Full name: Loai Taha
- Date of birth: 26 November 1989 (age 36)
- Place of birth: Arraba, Israel
- Height: 1.87 m (6 ft 2 in)
- Position: Centre-back

Team information
- Current team: Hapoel Acre
- Number: 20

Youth career
- 2001–2006: Hapoel Haifa
- 2006–2007: Bnei Sakhnin

Senior career*
Years	Team	Apps	(Gls)
2007–2010	Ahva Arraba	27	(0)
2008	→ Hapoel Karmiel (loan)	11	(1)
2010–2012	F.C. Ashdod	1	(0)
2011	→ Hapoel Kfar Saba (loan)	14	(0)
2011–2012	→ Maccabi Umm al-Fahm (loan)	22	(0)
2012–2015	Hapoel Ra'anana	54	(2)
2015–2021	Hapoel Be'er Sheva	113	(0)
2021–2023	Hapoel Haifa	16	(0)
2023–2026	Hapoel Acre	60	(0)

International career
2018–2021	Israel	13	(0)
- * Club domestic league appearances and goals

Loai Taha (Arabic: لؤي طه, Hebrew: לואי טאהא; born 26 November 1989) is an Israeli former footballer who played as a centre-back.

== Early life ==
Taha was born in Arraba, Israel, to a Muslim-Arab family.

== Honours ==
=== Club ===
Hapoel Be'er Sheva

- Israeli Premier League (3): 2015–16, 2016–17, 2017–18
- Israel Super Cup (2): 2016, 2017
- Toto Cup (1): 2016–17
- Israel State Cup (1): 2019–20
