= Shir Tzedek =

Israeli footballer

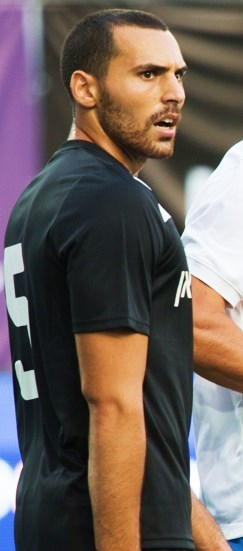

Personal information
- Full name: Shir Meir Tzedek
- Date of birth: August 22, 1989 (age 37)
- Place of birth: Beit Alfa, Israel
- Height: 1.82 m (5 ft 11 1/2 in)
- Position: Center back

Team information
- Current team: Maccabi Netanya
- Number: 5

Youth career
- 2002–2006: Hapoel Beit She'an
- 2006–2008: Maccabi Netanya
- 2008–2009: Ironi Kiryat Shmona

Senior career*
Years	Team	Apps	(Gls)
2008–2015	Ironi Kiryat Shmona	125	(7)
2015–2021	Hapoel Be'er Sheva	117	(1)
2021–2022	Maccabi Netanya	26	(1)

International career
2012–2018	Israel	16	(0)
- * Club domestic league appearances and goals as of 1 June 2021

Shir Meir Tzedek (Hebrew: שיר מאיר צדק; born 22 August 1989) is a retired Israeli footballer.

== Early life ==
Tzedek was born in Beit Alfa, Israel, to a Jewish family.

== Club career ==
Tzedek started his career at Hapoel Beit She'an and Maccabi Netanya. At 2009 moved to Hapoel Ironi Kiryat Shmona. On 28 October 2008 he made his debut at the senior team, at the 1–2 loss to Bnei Sakhnin at Toto Cup. One season later, he became a regular player in the team, and he won with the team at the Toto Cup Leumit, and promoted back to the Premier League.

During 2010–11 and 2011–12 seasons, he won twice at the Toto Cup and at the first club's championship. At 2012–13 season he was a partner in an increase to the Group stage of UEFA Europa League and the Israel State Cup final. 2013–14 season Tzedek became the club captain, and that season won the Israel State Cup.

== International career ==
On 29 February 2012 he made his debut at Israel national team against Ukraine at exhibition game.

== Honours ==
=== Player ===
Club
Hapoel Ironi Kiryat Shmona

- Toto Cup (2): 2010–11, 2011–12
- Toto Cup Leumit (1): 2009–10
- Liga Leumit (1): 2009–10
- Israeli Premier League (1): 2011–12
- Israel State Cup (1): 2013–14

Hapoel Beer Sheva

- Israeli Premier League (3): 2015-16, 2016-17,2017-18
- Israel Super Cup (2): 2016, 2017
- Toto Cup (1): 2016-17
