= Ben Sahar =

Israeli footballer

Ben Sahar בן שׂהר
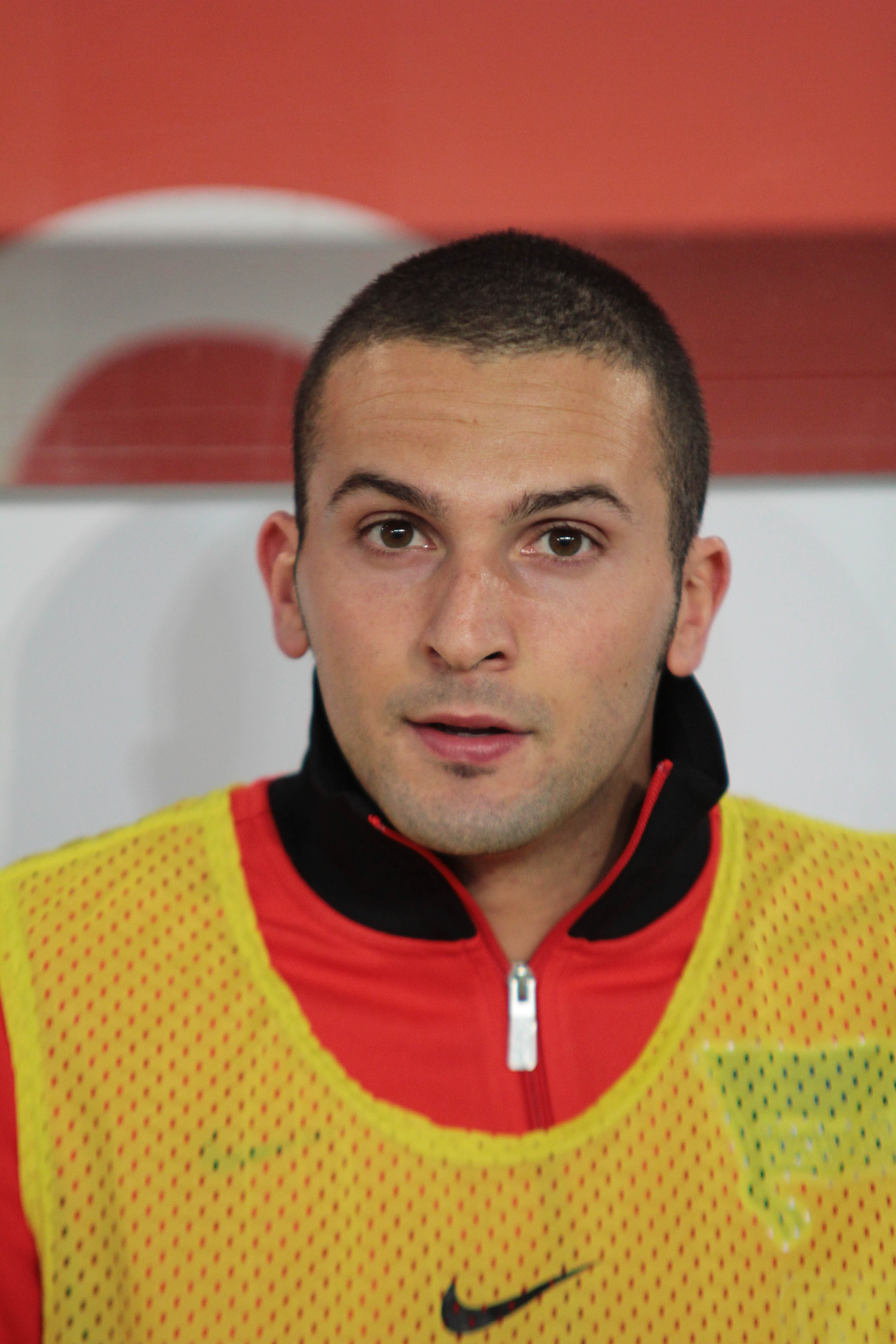
- Sahar in 2012

Personal information
- Full name: Ben Sahar
- Date of birth: 10 August 1989 (age 37)
- Place of birth: Holon, Israel
- Height: 1.80 m (5 ft 11 in)
- Positions: Striker; winger

Team information
- Current team: Hapoel Tel Aviv
- Number: 14

Youth career
- 2002–2006: Hapoel Tel Aviv
- 2006–2007: Chelsea

Senior career*
Years	Team	Apps	(Gls)
2007–2009	Chelsea	3	(0)
2007	→ Queens Park Rangers (loan)	9	(0)
2008	→ Sheffield Wednesday (loan)	12	(3)
2008	→ Portsmouth (loan)	0	(0)
2009	→ De Graafschap (loan)	16	(5)
2009–2012	Espanyol	22	(1)
2010–2011	→ Hapoel Tel Aviv (loan)	30	(16)
2011–2012	→ Auxerre (loan)	21	(3)
2012–2014	Hertha BSC	18	(2)
2013	→ Hertha BSC II	7	(3)
2013–2014	→ Arminia Bielefeld (loan)	14	(4)
2014–2015	Willem II	34	(7)
2015–2021	Hapoel Be'er Sheva	151	(62)
2020–2021	→ APOEL (loan)	32	(6)
2021–2023	Maccabi Haifa	20	(1)
2023–2024	Maccabi Petah Tikva	23	(4)
2024–2025	Hapoel Tel Aviv	22	(3)

International career
2005–2006	Israel U17	6	(5)
2006	Israel U18	1	(0)
2006–2010	Israel U21	16	(8)
2007–2019	Israel	44	(8)
- * Club domestic league appearances and goals as of 1 June 2024

Ben Sahar (Hebrew: בן שׂהר, changed the Hebrew spelling of his surname from סהר; born 10 August 1989) is a retired Israeli footballer who played as a striker. He has also played for the Israel national team.

== Early life ==
Sahar was born in Holon, Israel, to a Jewish family. His father is Israeli-born and of Tunisian Jewish descent, who works as an electrician, and his mother teaches sports. He grew up in the city of Modi'in, Israel. Before his transfer to Chelsea F.C., he acquired a Polish passport as well, on account of his Israeli-born mother who is of Ashkenazi Polish-Jewish and Latvian Jewish descent, that made him eligible to play as a non-foreigner in EU leagues including the UK.

As an Israeli citizen, Sahar was due to return to Israel for a three-year spell of military service in the IDF. However, Israeli lawmakers were working on a legislation (nicknamed "The Ben Sahar Law") that would have allowed Sahar to complete a national service (Sherut Leumi) term in England instead. The law did not pass and as a result, Sahar was drafted into the Israel Defense Forces. Under the terms of his military service, he had to visit his military base every time he was on vacation in Israel.

== Club career ==
Sahar began playing football in his hometown of Modi'in, Israel. There, he was enrolled in the Sportop Football Academy, before joining the youth ranks of Hapoel Tel Aviv. While he was promoted to the first team by manager Itzhak Shum, he did not feature in any matches, since his transfer was completed before the start of the 2006–07 season. At 16, Sahar was the equivalent of a second-year apprentice at Chelsea; he first caught the eye of Chelsea staff in an Under-16 fixture against Ireland in 2004.

=== Chelsea ===
Sahar signed for Chelsea of the English Premier League in May 2006 from Hapoel Tel Aviv for £320,000, having previously spent a two-month period on trial at Stamford Bridge.

Sahar was called up to the Chelsea first team to play Macclesfield Town in the FA Cup on 6 January 2007, and made his debut coming on as a substitute for Salomon Kalou in the 76th minute. Four days later, Sahar came on as a substitute in the 60th minute of Chelsea's 1–1 draw with Wycombe Wanderers in the League Cup. He made his Premiership debut on 13 January 2007, coming off the bench to replace Arjen Robben in the 82nd minute of the match against Wigan Athletic. He later made two additional Premier League substitute appearances for the Blues that season, against Manchester United and Everton.

==== Queens Park Rangers (loan) ====
Sahar joined then Championship side Queens Park Rangers, on loan, for the beginning of the 2007–08 season, on 26 July 2007, for an initial three-month period. He followed this up with two goals in a pre-season friendly against Premier League side Fulham, earning Queens Park Rangers a 2–1 win. Following this, his loan-deal was then extended to 2 January 2008. Sahar suffered numerous injuries during this period and did not manage to score during his nine league appearances.

==== Sheffield Wednesday (loan) ====
After Sahar returned from an injury-plagued spell at QPR, Sheffield Wednesday completed the signing of Sahar on an initial one-month loan from Chelsea on 21 February 2008. This was extended until 19 April, and again until the end of the season on 4 May 2008. Sahar scored his first goal for Sheffield Wednesday against Crystal Palace on 22 March 2008. He followed this up with further strikes against Scunthorpe United and Norwich City. The latter goal was important as it ensured Sheffield Wednesday's survival in the Championship.

Sahar finished with three goals from 12 appearances for Sheffield Wednesday in his second loan spell in the Championship.

==== Portsmouth (loan) ====
On 12 June 2008, it was reported that Sahar was in the Netherlands to discuss another season-long loan with Dutch club NEC Nijmegen. However, according to NEC officials a deal could not be signed with Sahar due to financial issues. Instead he agreed to a six-month loan deal with FA Cup winners Portsmouth, and on 1 July he was officially unveiled as a Portsmouth player. Sahar joined Premier League side Portsmouth on a six-month loan deal on 1 July 2008, and was given the number 26 shirt. He featured regularly in pre-season for Portsmouth, making seven appearances and scoring against Nigerian Premier League champions Kano Pillars, Conference South side Havant & Waterlooville, and Southern Football League Division One South & West side Gosport Borough.

However, Sahar was forced to endure yet another unsuccessful loan spell. Despite being involved in many of Portsmouth's pre-season matches, Sahar did not play once for Portsmouth; he was an unused substitute in three of their matches. "If I had played a few games and they said I wasn't good enough, then fine. But the fact is that I haven't been given that chance to shine," Sahar said of his disappointment at not being given one opportunity to prove himself.

==== De Graafschap (loan) ====
Sahar joined Eredivisie side De Graafschap on loan on 2 January 2009. He played for De Graafschap until the end of the season. He played his first match for De Graafschap in a friendly against Turkish club Sivasspor. He scored his first two goals for De Graafschap in a friendly match against Belgian team K.V. Mechelen. He scored his first goal in the Eredivisie on 17 January 2009 in his debut match, against Willem II. After only 17 minutes, Sahar received a pass from Luuk de Jong and then curled the shot into the top corner, after passing a defender in the 18-yard (16 m) box. His second goal came in an away game against fellow relegation strugglers, Roda JC. His third goal for De Graafschap came in a home game against SC Heerenveen. In this game, he finished well to score the game's first goal with his left foot, after good play from Luuk de Jong. His fourth and fifth goals came in the home game against NEC Nijmegen. Sahar scored a penalty for the opening goal after missing an earlier penalty attempt. He scored his second goal of the match with a close range strike. This match finished in a 2–2 draw. De Graafschap finished second-bottom in the 2008–09 Eredivisie. This meant that they would have to participate in play-offs with teams from the Dutch second division in order to retain their place in the Eredivisie. In their first play-off match against MVV Maastricht, Sahar scored a goal within 60 seconds of the match's commencement to set up a 3–2 away win for De Graafschap.

Sahar finished with five goals and one assist in 16 appearances for De Graafschap in the 2008–09 Eredivisie, and in the relegation playoffs he scored one goal and made two assists in six games, making of a total of six goals and three assists in 22 games.

=== Espanyol ===
Sahar moved to Espanyol for a fee of £1million on a four-year deal, after leaving Stamford Bridge in the summer of 2009. He was presented with the number 14 jersey. On 2 August 2009, Sahar scored two goals in a friendly match against Liverpool as a substitute, also picking up the man-of-the-match award in a 3–0 win. These were the second and third goals of the match, scored at the club's inaugural match at their new stadium, the Estadi Cornellà-El Prat. Sahar scored his first league goal for Espanyol on 23 September 2009, with a header in a 2–1 victory over Málaga; also his club's first goal at the stadium in a competitive match.

==== Hapoel Tel Aviv (loan) ====
Despite the objections of his agent, Ronen Katzav, on 20 July 2010, Sahar joined his youth club Hapoel Tel Aviv on a one-year loan. Hapoel Tel Aviv also purchased 10% of the transfer rights for £100,000. Sahar scored his first goal for Hapoel Tel Aviv against FK Aktobe from Kazakhstan in the 2010–11 UEFA Champions League third qualifying round, after a pass from Itay Shechter and scored in the final qualifying round in the away leg versus Red Bull Salzburg.

Sahar found great difficulty scoring in the Ligat Ha'Al upon arrival. Assistant manager, Yossi Abuksis attributed this to a mental difficulty that Sahar created for himself. Sahar came back to Israel as a superstar and the pressures that came with this status were difficult to bear at the start of the season. When Itay Shechter went out with an injury midseason, Sahar capitalized on the increased playing time to create a striking partnership with Toto Tamuz.

==== Auxerre (loan) ====
On 4 July 2011, Sahar joined Ligue 1 side Auxerre on a one-year loan. Auxerre had an option to sign Sahar permanently for a fee of €1.5 million which the club did not take advantage of at the end of the player's loan spell.

=== Hertha BSC ===
On 19 July 2012, Sahar signed for 2. Bundesliga side Hertha BSC on a free transfer from Espanyol. He made his league debut for the side on 16 September 2012, coming on in the 82nd minute in Hertha's 2–0 win over VfR Aalen.

==== Arminia Bielefeld (loan) ====
He was on loan to Arminia Bielefeld from January 2014 until June 2014.

=== Willem II ===
On 21 July 2014, it was announced that Sahar had signed a one-year deal with an option for another year with Dutch Eredivisie side Willem II. He finished the season with 7 goals, but Willem II decided not to exercise the option.

=== Hapoel Be'er Sheva ===
On 8 July 2015, Sahar signed to Hapoel Be'er Sheva on a three-year deal. He finished the 2015–16 season with nine goals, contributing to the team's first league championship in 40 years.

=== Maccabi Haifa ===
Displaying his skills as a striker, Sahar played a significant role in Maccabi Haifa's victories in the 2021 Israel Super Cup and the Toto Cup.

=== Maccabi Petah Tikva ===
On 1 July 2023, Sahar joined Maccabi Petah Tikva. On 30 May 2024, he won his first title with the club, Israel State Cup, after beating Hapoel Be'er Sheva 1–0 in the final.

=== The return to Hapoel Tel Aviv ===
On 18 August 2024 returned to Hapoel Tel Aviv after it relegated to Liga Leumit.

== International career ==
On 7 October 2006, Sahar made his debut for the Israel U-21s in a playoff against France – scoring Israel's goal in the away leg which ended 1–1, on the way to Israel's shock qualification to UEFA U-21 Championship 2007 with a 2–1 aggregate win.

On 7 February 2007, at the age of 17-and-a-half, Sahar became the youngest player to ever play for the Israel national football team, in a friendly match against Ukraine (a feat since surpassed by Gai Assulin). In doing so, he became Chelsea's youngest player to earn an international cap. He earned his second cap against England on 24 March 2007, coming on as a substitute in the 69th minute. Sahar became the youngest player to score for the Israel national football team in his third appearance with the team on 28 March 2007, scoring two goals against Estonia as a substitute in Israel's 4–0 win. This was the youngest international goal scored by a Chelsea player. Sahar scored his third international goal on 6 September 2008, with an equaliser in the 90th minute against Switzerland in a 2010 FIFA World Cup qualifier, following up with his fourth and fifth international goals a year later in the 2010 World Cup qualifier against Luxembourg on 9 September 2009.

== Career statistics ==
=== International ===
Scores and results list Israel's goal tally first, score column indicates score after each Sahar goal.

List of international goals scored by Ben Sahar
No.	Date	Venue	Opponent	Score	Result	Competition
1	28 March 2007	Ramat Gan Stadium, Ramat Gan, Israel	Estonia	3–0	4–0	UEFA Euro 2008 qualification
2	28 March 2007	Ramat Gan Stadium, Ramat Gan, Israel	Estonia	4–0	4–0	UEFA Euro 2008 qualification
3	6 September 2008	Ramat Gan Stadium, Ramat Gan, Israel	Switzerland	2–2	2–2	2010 FIFA World Cup qualification
4	9 September 2009	Ramat Gan Stadium, Ramat Gan, Israel	Luxembourg	6–0	7–0	2010 FIFA World Cup qualification
5	9 September 2009	Ramat Gan Stadium, Ramat Gan, Israel	Luxembourg	7–0	7–0	2010 FIFA World Cup qualification
6	29 February 2012	HaMoshava Stadium, Petah Tikva, Israel	Ukraine	2–3	2–3	Friendly
7	6 June 2017	Netanya Stadium, Netanya, Israel	Moldova	1–1	1–1	Friendly
8	15 November 2018	Netanya Stadium, Netanya, Israel	Guatemala	7–0	7–0	Friendly

== Honours ==
Hapoel Tel Aviv

- Israel State Cup: 2010–11

Hertha BSC

- 2. Bundesliga: 2012–13

Hapoel Beer Sheva

- Israeli Premier League: 2015–16, 2016–17, 2017–18
- Israel State Cup: 2019–20
- Toto Cup: 2016–17
- Israel Super Cup: 2016

Maccabi Haifa

- Israeli Premier League: 2021–22, 2022–23
- Toto Cup: 2021–22
- Israel Super Cup: 2021

Maccabi Petah Tikva

- Israel State Cup: 2023–24

== See also ==
- List of select Jewish football (association; soccer) players
