= Or Havivyan =

Israeli footballer

Or Havivyan אור חביביאן
Personal information
- Full name: Or Havivyan
- Date of birth: 27 December 1994 (age 31)
- Place of birth: Zrahia, Israel
- Height: 1.78 m (5 ft 10 in)
- Position: Forward

Team information
- Current team: Maccabi Ironi Netivot

Youth career
- Hapoel Be'er Sheva

Senior career*
| Years | Team | Apps | (Gls) |
| 2014–2017 | Hapoel Be'er Sheva | 3 | (0) |
| 2016–2017 | → Hapoel Petah Tikva (loan) | 2 | (0) |
| 2017 | Ironi Nesher | 0 | (0) |
| 2017–2018 | Maccabi Yavne | 2 | (0) |
| 2018–2019 | Maccabi Kiryat Gat | 32 | (0) |
| 2019 | Maccabi Ironi Netivot | 5 | (0) |
| 2019–2020 | F.C. Be'er Sheva | 21 | (3) |
| 2020–2021 | Hapoel Merhavim | 21 | (7) |
| 2021–2022 | Hapoel Yeruham | 22 | (2) |
- * Club domestic league appearances and goals

Or Havivyan (Hebrew: אור חביביאן; born 27 December 1994, in Zrahia) is an Israeli footballer who plays for Maccabi Ironi Netivot as a central midfielder.

== Career ==
He made his debut for Hapoel Be'er Sheva against Maccabi Sha'arayim in State Cup, in January 2014.

== Club career statistics ==
(correct as of July 2017)

| Club | Season | League | League | | Cup | | Toto Cup | | Europe | | Total | |
| Club | Season | League | Apps | Goals | Apps | Goals | Apps | Goals | Apps | Goals | Apps | Goals |
|---|---|---|---|---|---|---|---|---|---|---|---|---|
| Hapoel Be'er Sheva | 2013–14 | Ligat Ha'Al | 1 | 0 | 1 | 0 | 0 | 0 | 0 | 0 | 2 | 0 |
| Hapoel Be'er Sheva | 2014–15 | Ligat Ha'Al | 1 | 0 | 1 | 0 | 3 | 0 | 0 | 0 | 5 | 0 |
| Hapoel Be'er Sheva | 2015–16 | Ligat Ha'Al | 1 | 0 | 1 | 0 | 3 | 0 | 0 | 0 | 5 | 0 |
| Hapoel Petah Tikva | 2016–17 | Liga Leumit | 2 | 0 | 0 | 0 | 2 | 0 | 0 | 0 | 4 | 0 |
| Career | | | 5 | 0 | 3 | 0 | 8 | 0 | 0 | 0 | 16 | 0 |

== Honours ==
Hapoel Be'er Sheva

- Israeli Premier League: 2013-14 (runner-up), 2015–16 (winners), 2016–17 (winners)
- Israeli State Cup: 2014-15 (runner-up)
