= Maharan Radi =

Israeli footballer

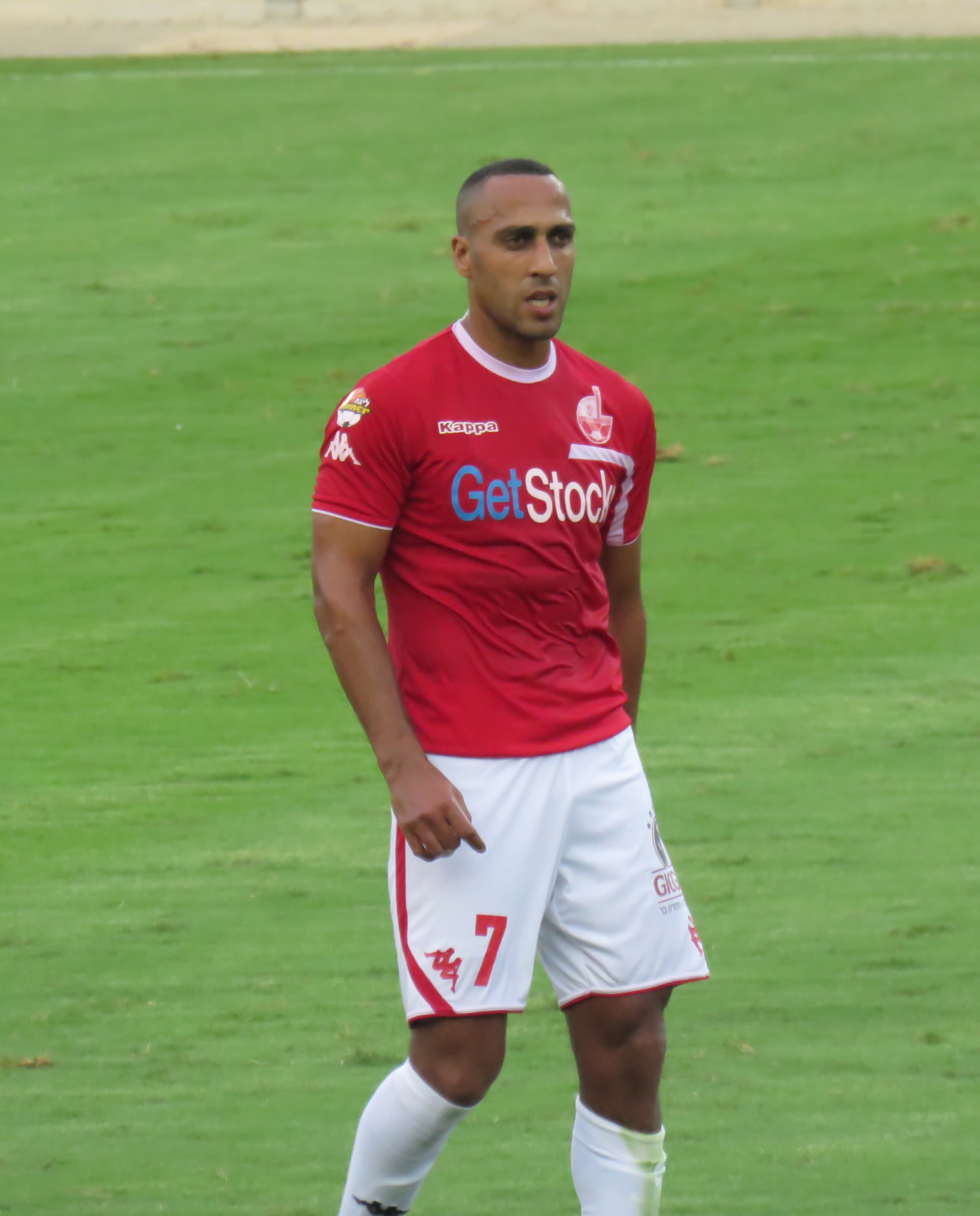
- Radi playing for Hapoel Be'er Sheva in 2015

Personal information
- Full name: Maharan Radi
- Date of birth: July 1, 1982 (age 44)
- Place of birth: Sulam, Israel
- Position: Midfielder

Team information
- Current team: Hapoel Nof HaGalil

Youth career
- 2001: Maccabi Tel Aviv

Senior career*
Years	Team	Apps	(Gls)
2001–2003	Hapoel Majd al-Krum		
2003–2004	Maccabi Kafr Kanna		
2004–2006	Hapoel Ashkelon		
2006–2008	Maccabi Herzliya	65	(8)
2008–2010	Bnei Yehuda	59	(3)
2010–2011	Hapoel Acre	29	(5)
2011–2012	Bnei Sakhnin	30	(13)
2012–2015	Maccabi Tel Aviv	83	(14)
2015–2018	Hapoel Be'er Sheva	100	(17)
2018–2020	Bnei Sakhnin	62	(10)
2021–2023	F.C. Kafr Qasim	51	(9)
2023–	Hapoel Nof HaGalil	15	(1)

International career
2012–2014	Israel	10	(1)
- * Club domestic league appearances and goals as of 15 June 2023

Maharan Radi (Arabic: مهران راضي, Hebrew: מהראן ראדי; born 1 July 1982) is an Israeli footballer who plays for Hapoel Nof HaGalil. He was capped 10 times by the Israel national team between 2012 and 2014.

== Club career ==
An Arab citizen of Israel, Radi started his career at the Maccabi Tel Aviv youth team. In 2006, he was promoted with his team Maccabi Herzliya to the Israeli Premier League and won the Toto Cup in the next season. In 2011–12 Radi played for Bnei Sakhnin, ending the season with 13 goals and 10 assists, being one of the major factors making his team reach the top playoff. In 2012–13 he joined his youth club, Maccabi Tel Aviv, where a small group of youths chanted racist slogans towards him during his first training session. Radi scored eight goals and made 11 assists as Maccabi Tel Aviv won the championship that season. In 2013–14, he participated in the Europa League group stage and the round of 32 with Maccabi.

== International ==
On 2 September 2012 Radi received his first call-up to the Israeli national team from coach Eli Guttman. The following month he scored on his second appearance for the national team in a qualifier against Luxembourg.

== Honours ==
=== Club ===
- Israeli Premier League (6): 2012–13, 2013–14, 2014–15, 2015–16, 2016–17, 2017–18
- Toto cup top Division (3): 2006–07, 2014–15, 2016–17
- Israel State Cup (1): 2014–15
- Toto Cup Artzit (1): 2004–05
- Israel Super Cup (1): 2016

=== Individual ===
- Israeli Premier League – 2011–12 Most assists (10)
- Israeli Premier League – 2012–13 Most assists (11)

=== International goals ===
No.	Date	Venue	Opponent	Score	Result	Competition	Ref.
1.	12 October 2012	Stade Josy Barthel, City of Luxembourg, Luxembourg	Luxembourg	1–0	6–0	2014 FIFA World Cup qualification	
