= Asi Rahamim =

Israeli footballer

Asi Rahamim אסי רחמים
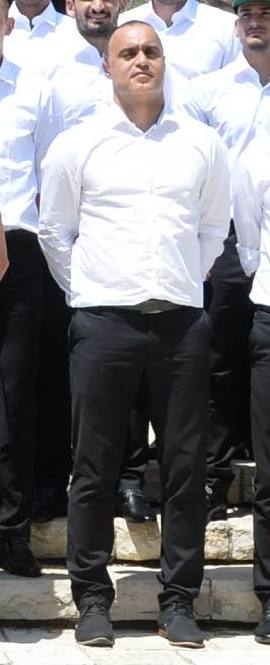

Personal information
- Full name: Assaf 'Asi' Rahamim
- Date of birth: 3 July 1971 (age 55)
- Place of birth: Be'er Sheva, Israel
- Height: 1.80 m (5 ft 11 in)
- Position: Goalkeeper

Youth career
- Hapoel Be'er Sheva

Senior career*
Years	Team	Apps	(Gls)
1988–1989	Hapoel Be'er Sheva		
1989–1991	Hapoel Ashkelon		
1991–1995	Hapoel Be'er Sheva		
1995–1996	Maccabi Yavne		
1996–1998	Hapoel Ashkelon		
1998–2004	Hapoel Be'er Sheva		
2004–2005	F.C. Ashdod		
2005–2009	Hapoel Be'er Sheva		
- * Club domestic league appearances and goals as of 27 July 2015

Asi Rahamim (Hebrew: אסי רחמים; born 3 July 1971) is an Israeli former professional footballer who has played in Hapoel Be'er Sheva.

== Honours ==
=== Club ===
Hapoel Be'er Sheva

- Premier League:
  - Third place (3): 1993/1994, 1994/1995, 1996/1997
- State Cup:
  - Runners-up (1): 2002/2003
- Toto Cup:
  - Winners (1): 1995/1996
- Toto Cup Second League:
  - Winners (1): 2008/2009
  - Runners-up (1): 2005/2006
