= 2016 Israel Super Cup =

Hapoel Be'er Sheva	Maccabi Haifa
4	2
- Date: 11 August 2016
- Venue: Netanya Stadium, Netanya
- Attendance: 10,000

The 2016 Israel Super Cup is the 21st Israel Super Cup (26th, including unofficial matches, as the competition wasn't played within the Israel Football Association in its first 5 editions, until 1969), an annual Israel football match played between the winners of the previous season's Top Division and Israel State Cup. This is the second time since 1990 that the match was staged, after a planned resumption of the cup was cancelled in 2014.

The game was played between Hapoel Be'er Sheva, champions of the 2015–16 Israeli Premier League and Maccabi Haifa, winners of the 2015-16 Israeli State Cup. As it has ended with the score of 4-2 to Hapoel Be'er Sheva after they were losing to 2-0 in the half time.

== Match details ==
11 August 2016

Hapoel Be'er Sheva	4–2	Maccabi Haifa
Maor Buzaglo 54', 69'; Anthony Nwakaeme 84'; Ben Sahar 90+4'		Nikita Rukavytsya 7'; Shoval Gozlan 22'

Netanya, Netanya

Hapoel Be'er Sheva	Maccabi Haifa

GK	55	(Israel) Guy Haimov
RB	2	(Israel) Ben Bitton
CB	20	(Israel) Loai Taha (substituted off) 45'
CB	5	(Israel) Shir Tzedek
LB	3	(Israel) Ben Turjeman
DM	30	(Nigeria) John Ogu (yellow card) 50'
CM	12	(Romania) Ovidiu Hoban (substituted off) 45'
LM	11	(Israel) Maor Buzaglo (yellow card) 88'
CF	24	(Israel) Maor Melikson (c) (substituted off) 85'
RW	9	(Nigeria) Anthony Nwakaeme (substituted off) 85'
CF	22	(Brazil) Lúcio Maranhão (substituted off) 66'
Substitutes:
GK	1	(Israel) Dudu Goresh
DF	17	(Israel) Matan Ohayon (substituted in) 45'
MF	21	(Israel) Yuval Shabtay (substituted in) 85'
MF	7	(Israel) Maharan Radi (substituted in) 45'
MF	16	(Israel) Vladimir Brown (substituted in) 85'
MF	19	(Israel) Dan Bitton
FW	14	(Israel) Ben Sahar (substituted in) 66'
Manager:
(Israel) Barak Bakhar

GK	1	(Israel) Ohad Levita
RB	27	(Israel) Eyal Meshumar
CB	4	(Spain) Marc Valiente
CB	21	(Israel) Dekel Keinan (c) (substituted off) 57'
LB	15	(Israel) Sun Menahem
DM	26	(Israel) Firas Mugrabi (substituted off) 72'
CM	31	(Israel) Neta Lavi
CM	51	(Uruguay) Gary Kagelmacher (yellow card) 81'
RW	28	(Israel) Yaniv Brik (substituted off) 65'
LW	13	(Australia) Nikita Rukavytsya
CF	17	(Israel) Shoval Gozlan (yellow card) 56' (substituted off) 67'
Substitutes:
GK	55	(Israel) Omri Glazer
DF	2	(Israel) Ayid Habshi
DF	5	(Israel) Eyad Abu Abaid (substituted in) 57'
MF	14	(Israel) Gil Vermouth (substituted in) 72'
MF	9	(Netherlands) Glynor Plet (substituted in) 67'
FW	32	(Israel) Amit Zenati (substituted in) 57'
MF	25	(Czech Republic) Kamil Vacek (substituted in) 65'
Manager:
(Netherlands) René Meulensteen

Man of the Match:

MATCH OFFICIALS

- Assistant referees:
- Fourth official:
- Additional assistant referees:

Match rules

- 90 minutes.
- Penalty shoot-out if scores level.
- Seven named substitutes, of which up to five may be used.
