= Musa Tarabin =

Israeli footballer

Musa Tarabin موسى ترابين
Personal information
- Date of birth: 16 August 1997 (age 29)
- Place of birth: Shaqib al-Salam, Israel
- Height: 1.72 m (5 ft 7 1/2 in)
- Position: Forward

Team information
- Current team: F.C. Arad

Youth career
- Hapoel Be'er Sheva

Senior career*
Years	Team	Apps	(Gls)
2016–2017	Hapoel Be'er Sheva	0	(0)
2016–2017	→ Hapoel Bnei Lod	6	(0)
2017	→ Hapoel Jerusalem	9	(1)
2017–2020	Hapoel Iksal	67	(8)
2019	→ Hapoel Bnei Lod	5	(0)
2020–2021	Markaz Balata		
2021–2022	Hilal Al-Quds Club		
2022–2023	Shabab Al-Khalil SC		
2023–2024	Shabab Al-Dhahiriya SC		
2024–2025	Beitar Kiryat Gat	16	(5)
2025–2026	Hapoel Segev Shalom	26	(6)
2026–	Arad	8	(3)
- * Club domestic league appearances and goals as of 1 October 2026

Musa Tarabin (Arabic: موسى ترابين, Hebrew: מוסא תראבין; born 16 August 1997) is an Israeli footballer who plays for F.C. Arad as a forward.
