= Ben Turjeman =

Israeli footballer

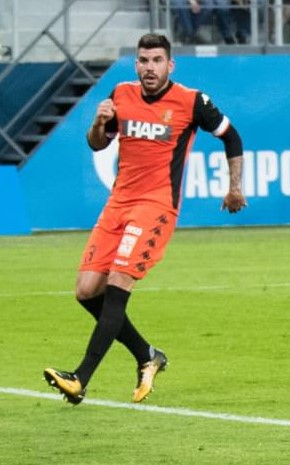

Personal information
- Date of birth: 9 January 1989 (age 37)
- Place of birth: Nof HaGalil, Israel
- Height: 1.78 m (5 ft 10 in)
- Position: Left back

Youth career
- Hapoel Nazareth Illit

Senior career*
Years	Team	Apps	(Gls)
2007–2013	Hapoel Nazareth Illit	102	(1)
2013–2017	Hapoel Be'er Sheva	37	(0)
2014–2015	→ Hapoel Acre	16	(0)
2015	→ Hapoel Petah Tikva	9	(0)
2017–2019	Bnei Yehuda	33	(0)
2019	Hapoel Be'er Sheva	2	(0)
2019–2020	Maccabi Netanya	6	(0)
2020	Bnei Sakhnin	15	(0)
2020	Hapoel Nof HaGalil	3	(0)
2020–2021	Hapoel Ashdod	7	(0)
2021–2022	F.C. Ramla	24	(0)
2022	Maccabi Amishav Petah Tikva	1	(0)
2022	Hakoah Amidar Ramat Gan	6	(0)
2022–2023	Hapoel Ashkelon	16	(0)
- * Club domestic league appearances and goals as of 1 May 2024

Ben Turjeman (Hebrew: בן תורג'מן; born 9 January 1989) is an Israeli footballer who plays as a left defender.

== Honours ==
=== Club ===
Hapoel Be'er Sheva

- Israeli Premier League: 2015–16, 2016-17
- Israel Super Cup: 2016
- Toto Cup: 2016–17
