= Netanya Stadium =

Football stadium in Netanya, Israel

Coordinates: 32°17′39.6″N 34°51′52.47″E

Miriam Stadium
- The Diamond Stadium
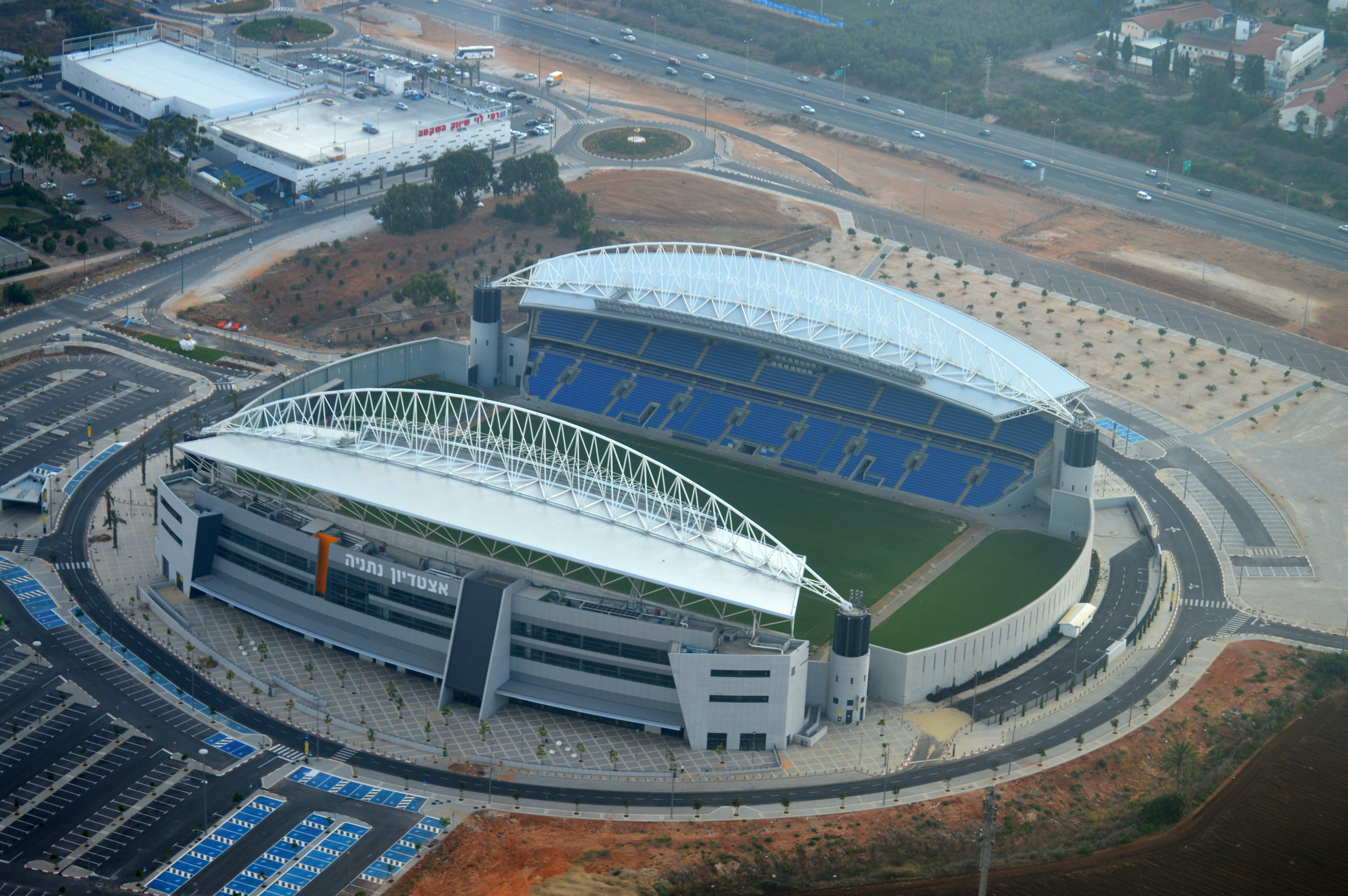
- UEFA
- Interactive map of Miriam Stadium
- Location: Netanya, Israel
- Owner: Netanya Municipality
- Operator: Netanya Municipality
- Capacity: 13,610
- Surface: Grass
- Public transit: Coastal Railway Line at Netanya Sapir

Construction
- Groundbreaking: 2005
- Opened: 30 October 2012
- Cost: ₪ 240 million € 55 million
- Architect: GAB Architects

Tenants
- Maccabi Netanya (2012–present); Israel national football team (selected matches); Israel national under-19 football team: Major sporting events hosted; 2013 UEFA European Under-21 Championship; 2015 UEFA Women's Under-19 Championship; 2018 World Lacrosse Championship; 2022 UEFA European Under-17 Championship

Miriam Stadium (Hebrew: אצטדיון מרים), commonly known as The Diamond Stadium, is a multi-use stadium in Netanya, Israel. It is used as the permanent home ground of Maccabi Netanya, and it has been used as the temporary homeground of Hapoel Hadera. The stadium also serves the Israel national football team for some select home matches, as well as the main home ground of the Israel national under-19 football team as of 2021.

== History ==
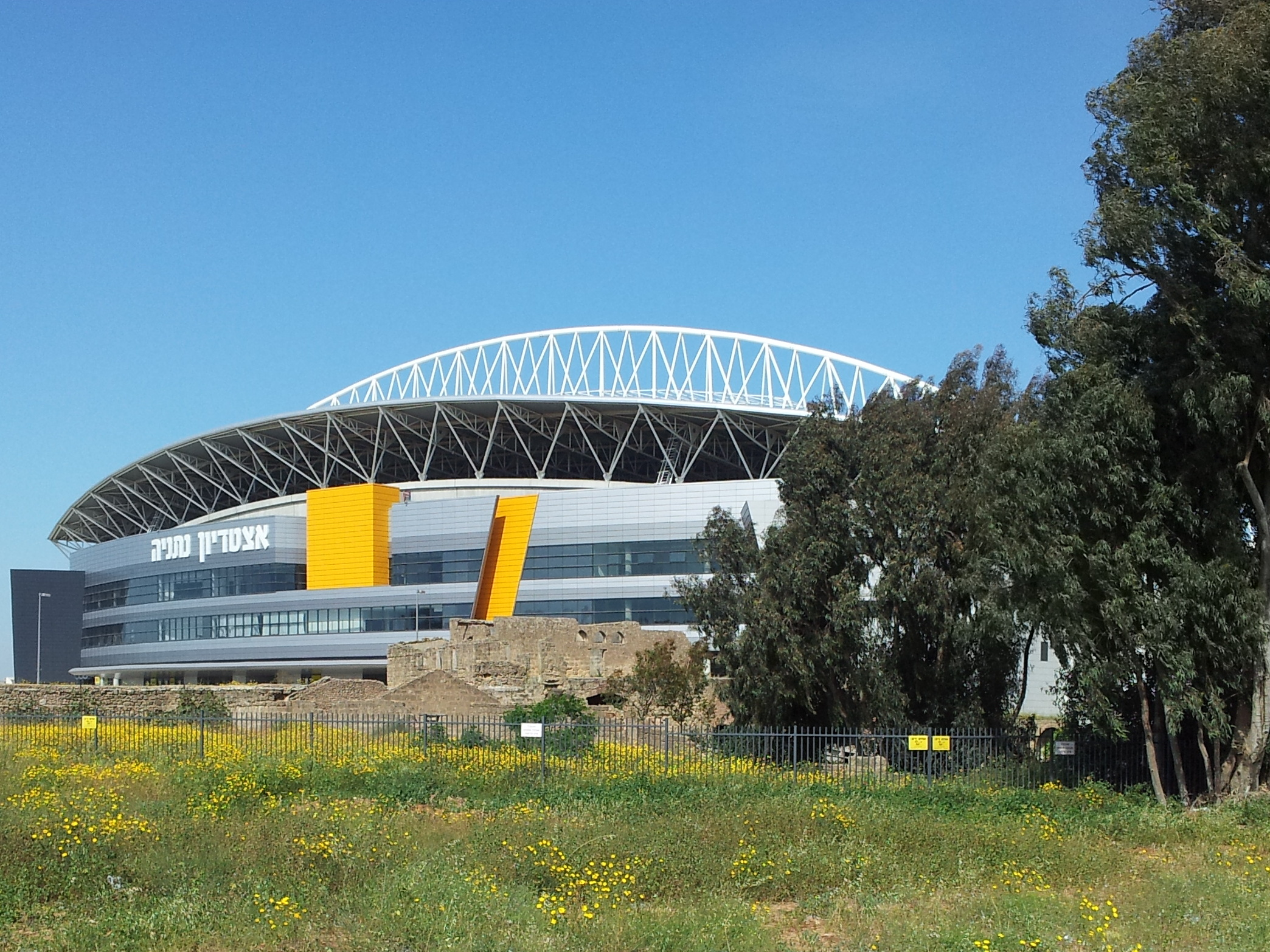
Netanya Stadium. The almost exclusively friendly matches stadium of the Israel national football team

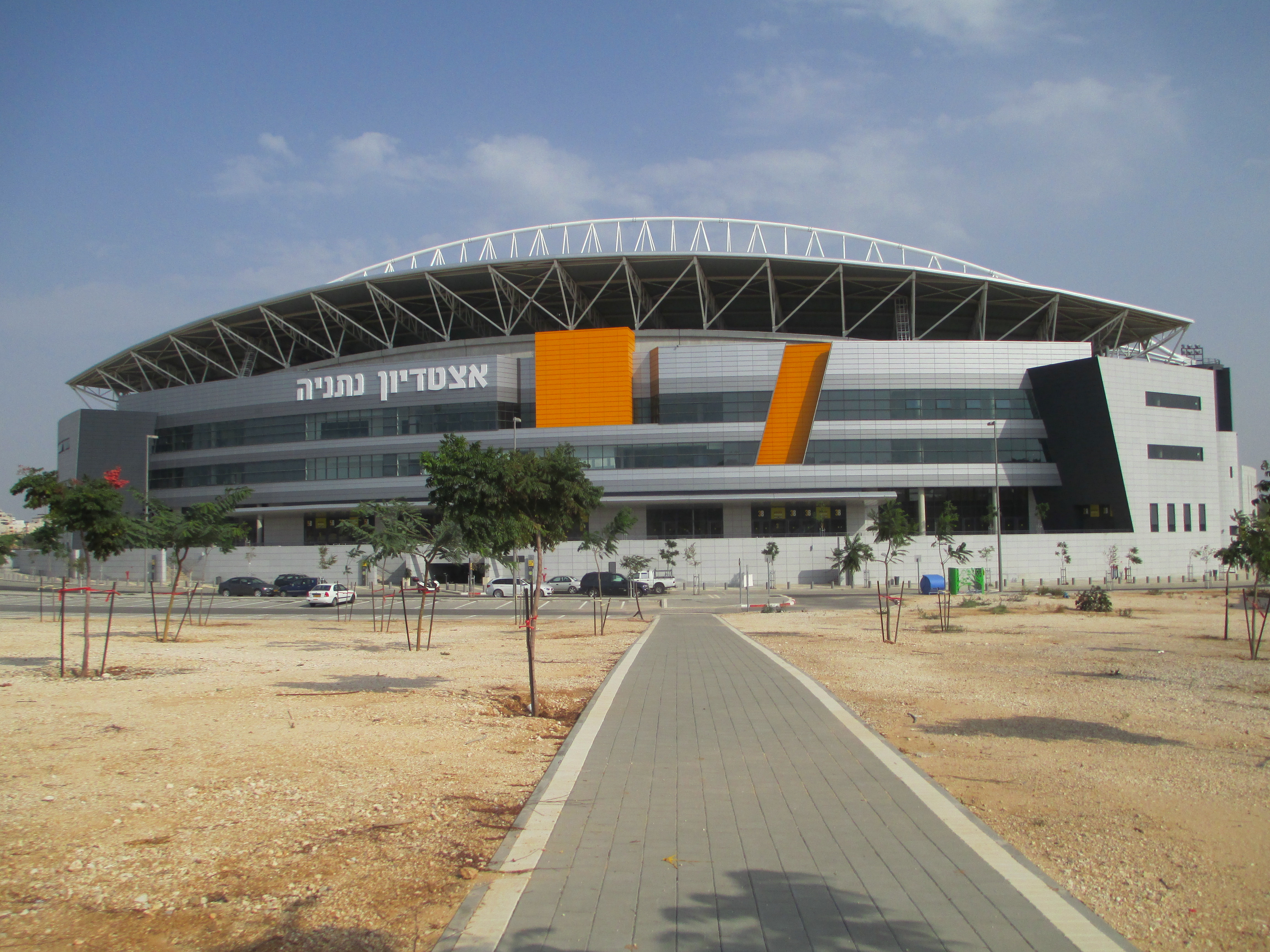
The initial entrance

On 30 September 2003, Minister of Internal Affairs Avraham Poraz approved the plan to build the stadium in an area called Birkat Hanoun. The plan was for a 24,000-seat stadium, consisting of four separate stands. The first two stands under construction will be the main east and west grandstands. It will house 36 private boxes, a VIP section and the press areas. This will be followed by construction of the remaining stands, along with training grounds.

Spread out over 163 dunams (16.3 hectares), the entire complex was planned to be connected by train and have a parking lot for around 1,000 cars. The architects of the stadium were from GAB (Goldschmidt Arditty Ben Nayin) Architects, one of Israel's leading sport architecture firms based in Jerusalem. Construction was managed by the Netanya Development Company, who handled planning of the project for three years before construction.

The bid for construction run by the Netanya Municipality was won by the company "Ramet", who also built the Teddy Stadium in Jerusalem. Construction began in 2005. The planned construction completion date was August 2008, but failure to meet scheduling changed the expected opening to March 2009. In 2009, financial disputes emerged between the municipality and the company Ramet, which resulted in the construction being halted. Eventually, Ramet left the project and the work was continued by the company "A. Dori", which was selected in a new bid.

The Sports Betting Council invested approximately 30 million shekels in the construction of the stadium, with the remaining funding coming from the sale of the land of the Sar-Tov Stadium, which was demolished and replaced with residential buildings.

The stadium officially opened on 30 October 2012. The first game was played on 4 November 2012, in front of a sold-out crowd as Maccabi Netanya defeated Hapoel Tel Aviv 2–1. Netanya's Ahmad Saba'a became the first player to score a goal in the new stadium. The stadium hosted the 2012–13 Israel State Cup finals in front of 8,621 people. A week later the Youth State Cup finals were held in the stadium in front of 4,600 people.

It was one of four venues for the 2013 UEFA European Under-21 Football Championship, holding three group matches and a semi-final. It was also one of four stadiums to host the 2015 UEFA European women's under-19 Football Championship and the final of the tournament.

The stadium played host to two open day and the championship game of the 2018 World Lacrosse Championship.

The first friendly match of the Israel national football team was played on 6 February 2013. Israel hosted the Finland national football team and won the match by a score of 2–1.

== Average attendance ==
Team	Average Attendance	Season
Maccabi Netanya	5,046	2012–13
Maccabi Netanya	3,742	2013–14
Maccabi Netanya	5,978	2014–15
Maccabi Netanya	4,705	2015–16
Maccabi Netanya	2,890	2016–17
Maccabi Netanya	7,390	2017–18
Maccabi Netanya	5,836	2018–19
Maccabi Netanya	5,614	2019–20
Maccabi Netanya	1,412 (due to COVID-19)	2020–21
Maccabi Netanya	6,993	2021–22
Maccabi Netanya	7,013	2022–23
Maccabi Netanya	6,074	2023–24
Maccabi Netanya	6,394	2024–25
Maccabi Netanya	6,478	2025–26

== International matches ==
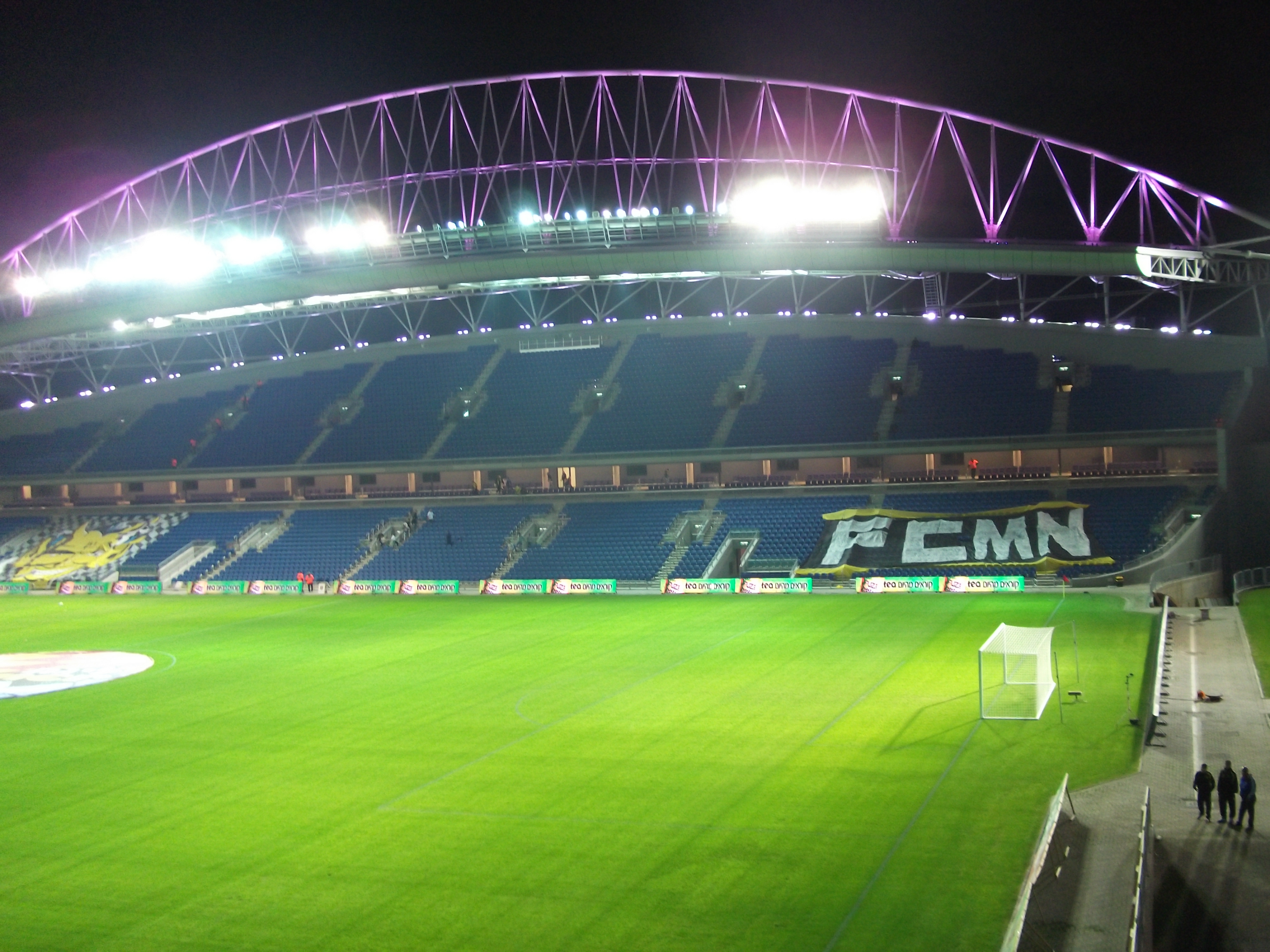
View of the east stand

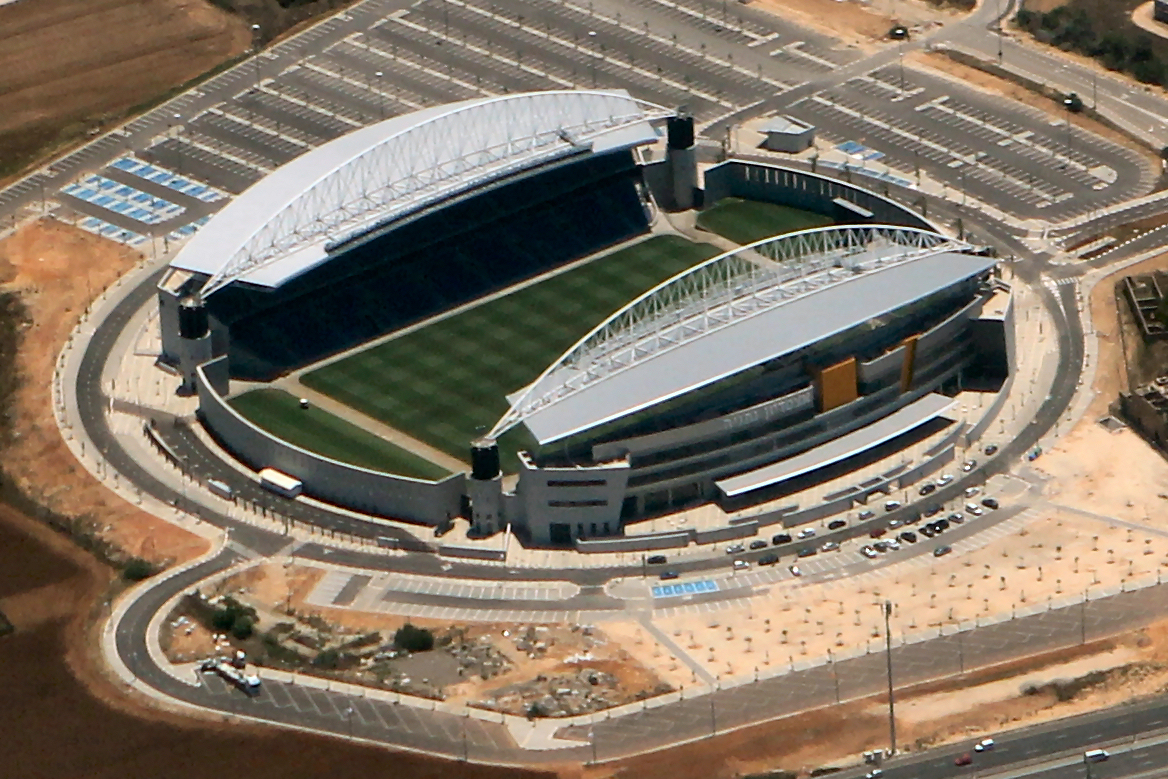
Netanya Stadium aerial view

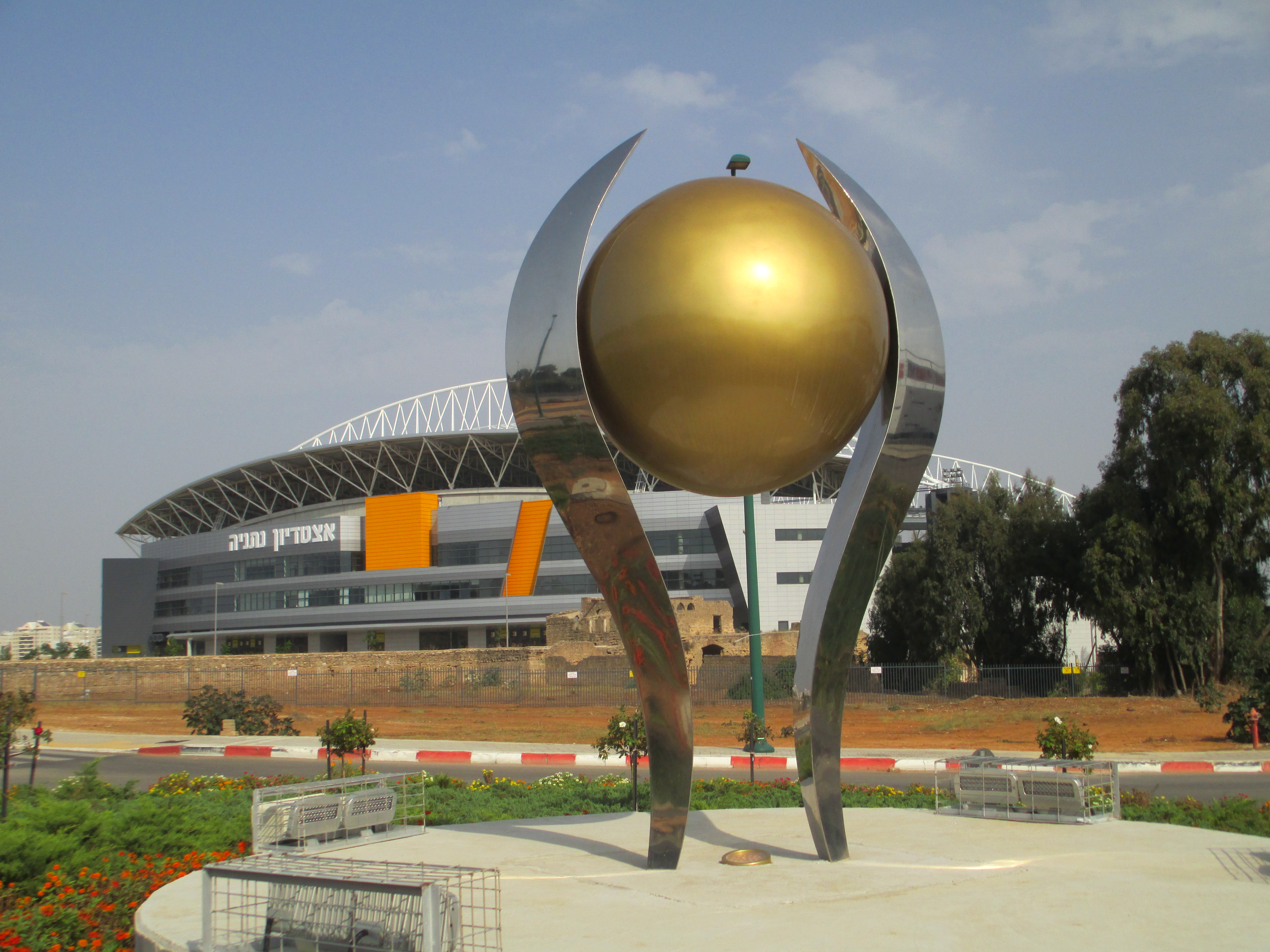
Golden Ball sculpture in front of the Netanya Stadium

Date		Result		Competition	Attendance
6 February 2013	Israel	2-1	Finland	Friendly	6,150
5 March 2014	Israel	1-3	Slovakia	Friendly	7,200
6 June 2017	Israel	1-1	Moldova	Friendly	5,000
24 March 2018	Israel	1-2	Romania	Friendly	7,925
15 November 2018	Israel	7-0	Guatemala	Friendly	5,900
7 September 2020	Israel	1-1	Slovakia	2020–21 UEFA Nations League	0
18 November 2020	Israel	1-0	Scotland	2020–21 UEFA Nations League	0
15 November 2021	Israel	3-2	Faroe Islands	2022 FIFA World Cup qualification	6,800
29 March 2022	Israel	2-2	Romania	Friendly	6,970

== See also ==
- Sports in Israel
