= 2016–17 Toto Cup Al =

Tournament details
- Country: Israel
- Teams: 14

Final positions
- Champions: Hapoel Be'er Sheva
- Runners-up: Hapoel Kiryat Shmona

Tournament statistics
- Matches played: 37
- Goals scored: 93 (2.51 per match)
- Top goal scorer: (Israel) Ben Sahar (5)

The 2016–17 Toto Cup Al was the 32nd season of the third-important football tournament in Israel since its introduction and the 11th tournament involving Israeli Premier League clubs only.

The competition is held in two stages. First, fourteen Premier League teams were divided into three groups, five teams in groups A and B and four teams in group C, the teams playing against each other once. The best three teams from groups A and B and the best two teams from group C will advance to the quarter-finals, which will be played over two-legged ties. The semi-finals and the final are then played as one-legged matches in a neutral venue.

Hapoel Be'er Sheva won the cup by defeating Hapoel Kiryat Shmona 4–1 in the final.

== Group stage ==
Groups were allocated according to geographic distribution of the clubs, with the northern clubs allocated to Group A (include team from Kfar Saba), In Group B allocated the three teams from Tel Aviv, one team from Petah Tikva and one more team from Ra'anana, the rest of the teams In Group C .

The matches started July 30th.

=== Group A ===
Pos	Team	Pld	W	D	L	GF	GA	GD	Pts	Qualification or relegation	MHA	HHA	IKS	BNS	HKS
1	Maccabi Haifa	4	3	1	0	6	3	+3	10	Qualified to Quarter-finals	—	1–0		2–1	
2	Hapoel Haifa	4	1	2	1	5	4	+1	5	Qualified to Quarter-finals		—	1–1	2–2	
3	Hapoel Kiryat Shmona	4	0	4	0	2	2	0	4	Qualified to Quarter-finals	0–0		—		0–0
4	Bnei Sakhnin	4	0	3	1	4	5	−1	3				1–1	—	0–0
5	Hapoel Kfar Saba	4	0	2	2	2	5	−3	2		2–3	0–2			—

Updated to match(es) played on 16 August 2016. Source: Israel Football Association
Rules for classification: 1) points; 2) goal difference; 3) number of wins; 4) goals scored; 5) head to head; 6)deciding match.

=== Group B ===
Pos	Team	Pld	W	D	L	GF	GA	GD	Pts	Qualification or relegation	MTA	BNY	HTA	MPT	HRA
1	Maccabi Tel Aviv	4	3	0	1	7	2	+5	9	Qualified to Quarter-finals	—			1–0	3–0
2	Bnei Yehuda	4	2	1	1	5	5	0	7	Qualified to Quarter-finals	2–1	—	0–2		
3	Hapoel Tel Aviv	4	1	2	1	2	2	0	5	Qualified to Quarter-finals	0–2		—		0–0
4	Maccabi Petah Tikva	4	1	1	2	3	3	0	4			1–2	0–0	—	
5	Hapoel Ra'anana	4	0	2	2	1	6	−5	2			1–1		0–2	—

Updated to match(es) played on 15 August 2016. Source: Israel Football Association
Rules for classification: 1) points; 2) goal difference; 3) number of wins; 4) goals scored; 5) head to head; 6)deciding match.

=== Group C ===
Pos	Team	Pld	W	D	L	GF	GA	GD	Pts	Qualification or relegation	ASH	HBS	HAS	BEI
1	F.C. Ashdod	3	2	1	0	6	3	+3	7	Qualified to Quarter-finals	—		2–2	3–1
2	Hapoel Be'er Sheva	3	2	0	1	9	3	+6	6	Qualified to Quarter-finals	0–1	—		
3	Hapoel Ashkelon	3	0	2	1	3	8	−5	2			0–5	—	1–1
4	Beitar Jerusalem	3	0	1	2	4	8	−4	1			2–4		—

Updated to match(es) played on 10 August 2016. Source: Israel Football Association
Rules for classification: 1) points; 2) goal difference; 3) number of wins; 4) goals scored; 5) head to head; 6)deciding match.

== Knockout rounds ==
All times are in Israel Standard Time

=== Quarter-finals ===
Team 1	Agg.	Team 2	1st leg	2nd leg
Maccabi Haifa	3–4	Hapoel Be'er Sheva	2–2	1–2
Bnei Yehuda	2–3	F.C. Ashdod	2–3	0–0
Hapoel Tel Aviv	2–5	Hapoel Haifa	0–3	2–2
Maccabi Tel Aviv	3–3 (a)	Hapoel Kiryat Shmona	3–2	0–1

=== Semi-finals ===
14 December 2016	Hapoel Kiryat Shmona	1–0 (a.e.t.)	F.C. Ashdod	Petah Tikva
20:30	Azulay 120' (pen.)	Report		Stadium: HaMoshava Stadium; Referee: Gal Leibovich

15 December 2016	Hapoel Be'er Sheva	2–1	Hapoel Haifa	Netanya
19:30	Sahar 44', 53' (pen.)	Report	10' Jazvić	Stadium: Netanya Stadium; Referee: Oren Simanian

=== Final ===
28 December 2016
20:00

Hapoel Be'er Sheva	4–1	Hapoel Kiryat Shmona
Sahar 34' (pen.), 36'; Radi 73'; Barda 90'	Report	70' (o.g.) Turjeman

Netanya Stadium
Referee: Ziv Adler
