= 2015–16 Hapoel Haifa F.C. season =

Hapoel Haifa
2015–16 season
- Chairman: Yoav Katz
- Manager: Tal Banin (until 21 December 2015); Meir Ben Margi (interim); Eli Cohen (from 15 February 2016)
- Stadium: Sammy Ofer
- Ligat Ha'Al: 12th
- State Cup: Round of 16
- Toto Cup: Quarter final
- Top goalscorer: League: Mahran Lala (11); All: Mahran Lala (11)
- Biggest win: 3 - 0 (vs Hapoel Acre, 5 August 2015)
- Biggest defeat: 1 - 4 (vs Hapoel Ironi Kiryat Shmona, 13 October 2015)
| Home colours | Away colours | Third colours |

Hapoel Haifa Football Club is an Israeli football club located in Haifa. During the 2017-18 campaign they will be competing in the following competitions:Israeli Premier League, State Cup, Toto Cup Ligat Al.

== Club ==
=== Kits ===
- Provider: Diadora
- Main Sponsor: MMM It's Good
- Secondary Sponsor: Moked Hat'ama

| Home | Away | 3rd | 4th | GK 1 | GK 2 |

=== Squad information ===
| N | Pos. | Nat. | Name | Age | EU | Since | App | Goals | Ends | Transfer fee | Notes |
|---|---|---|---|---|---|---|---|---|---|---|---|
| 1 | GK | (Israel) | Niv Antman | 34 | Non-EU | 2011 | 7 | 0 | 2019 | Youth system | |
| 2 | DF | (Lithuania) | Tadas Kijanskas | 41 | EU | 2013 | 62 | 4 | 2016 | | |
| 7 | MF | (Israel) | Ahad Azam | 34 | Non-EU | 2015 | 64 | 2 | 2017 | 650,000₪ | |
| 8 | MF | (Israel) | Hisham Kiwan | 39 | Non-EU | 2006 | 141 | 6 | 2016 | Youth system | |
| 10 | DF | (Israel) | Hanan Maman | 35 | Non-EU | 2015 | 77 | 9 | 2018 | | |
| 11 | FW | (Israel) | Mahran Lala | 44 | Non-EU | 2012 | 72 | 14 | 201? | | |
| 12 | FW | (Israel) | Oren Bitton | 32 | Non-EU | 2014 | 10 | 0 | 201? | Youth system | |
| 15 | DF | (Israel) | Haim Megrelashvili | 44 | Non-EU | 2014 | 111 | 3 | 2016 | | |
| 16 | GK | (Czech Republic) | Přemysl Kovář | 41 | EU | 2014 | 33 | 0 | 2016 | | |
| 19 | MF | (Israel) | Tomer Swisa | 34 | Non-EU | 2015 | 0 | 0 | 2016 | | |
| 21 | MF | (Israel) | Oshri Roash (captain) | 38 | Non-EU | 2006 | 123 | 0 | 201? | Youth system | |
| 22 | FW | (Israel) | Aner Schechter | 29 | Non-EU | 2015 | 1 | 0 | 201? | Youth system | |
| 23 | FW | (Israel) | Ali El-Khatib | 37 | Non-EU | 2015 | 8 | 4 | 2017 | | |
| 24 | DF | (Israel) | Liran Serdal | 32 | Non-EU | 2013 | 17 | 0 | 2016 | Youth system | |
| 25 | FW | (Montenegro) | Žarko Korać | 39 | EU | 2015 | 14 | 0 | 2019 | | |
| 26 | MF | (Israel) | Yossi Dora | 34 | Non-EU | 2015 | 190 | 0 | 2017 | | |
| 28 | MF | (Israel) | Maxim Plakuschenko | 30 | Non-EU | 2014 | 1 | 0 | 2019 | Youth system | |
| 16 | MF | (Portugal) | Bruno Pinheiro | 34 | EU | 2015 | 0 | 0 | 2017 | | |
| 17 | DF | (Israel) | Anas Dabour | 35 | Non-EU | 2015 | 0 | 0 | 2018 | | |
| | DF | (Israel) | Hilal Musa | 36 | Non-EU | 2015 | 0 | 0 | 2016 | | |
| 12 | DF | (Israel) | Amir Abu Nil | 35 | Non-EU | 2009 | 56 | 7 | 201? | | |

=== Transfers ===
==== Transfers in ====
| N | Pos. | Nat. | Name | Age | EU | Since | App | Goals | Ends | Transfer fee | Notes |
|---|---|---|---|---|---|---|---|---|---|---|---|
| 10 | DF | (Israel) | Hanan Maman | 24 | Non-EU | Beitar Jerusalem | Transfer | Summer | 2018 | Free | |
| 16 | MF | (Portugal) | Bruno Pinheiro | 23 | EU | (Greece) Apollon Smyrnis | Transfer | Summer | 2017 | | |
| 17 | DF | (Israel) | Anas Dabour | 24 | Non-EU | Maccabi Ahi Nazareth | Transfer | Summer | 2018 | | |
| | MF | (Israel) | Hilal Musa | 25 | Non-EU | (Palestine) Shabab Al-Khadr F.C. | Transfer | Summer | 2016 | | |
| 12 | DF | (Israel) | Amir Abu Nil | 35 | Non-EU | 2009 | 56 | 7 | 201? | | |
| 23 | MF | (Israel) | Adrian Rochet | 25 | EU | Hapoel Ironi Kiryat Shmona | Transfer | Summer | 2016 | | |
| 55 | MF | (Belarus) | Dzmitry Baha | 25 | EU | (Belarus) FC BATE Borisov | Transfer | Winter | 2017 | | |
| 30 | GK | (Croatia) | Marijan Antolović | 26 | EU | (Bosnia and Herzegovina) FK Željezničar Sarajevo | Transfer | Winter | 2017 | | |
| 20 | FW | (Israel) | Shlomi Arbeitman | 28 | Non-EU | Hepoel Haifa | Transfer | Winter | 2017 | | |

== Pre-season and friendlies ==
Win Draw Loss Postponed

| 16 July 2015 friendly | Hapoel Kfar Saba | 2 - 4 | Hapoel Haifa |
| | David 53'; Malka 80' | | Korać 7', 37'; Elbaz 52', 81' |

| 22 July 2015 Training Camp | Hapoel Haifa (Israel) | 3 - 1 | (Italy) Atalanta B.C. |
| 18:00 | Swisa 41' (pen.) | Report | Gómez 22' (pen.); D'Alessandro 48'; Moralez 90' |

| 25 July 2015 Training Camp | Hapoel Haifa (Israel) | 2 - 1 | (Italy) Palermo |
| 18:00 | Swisa 57' (pen.) | Report | Brugman 11'; Jajalo 91' |

| 27 July 2015 Training Camp | Hapoel Haifa (Israel) | 0 - 0 | (Italy) Lumezzane |
| 18:00 | | Report |

| March 25 2016 friendly | Hapoel Afula | 1 - 4 | Hapoel Haifa |
| | Ugwu Uzochukwu | | Lala; Korać; Rochet; Plakuschenko |

== Competitions ==
=== Overview ===
| Competition | First match | Last match | Starting round | Final position | Record | | | | | | | |
| Competition | First match | Last match | Starting round | Final position | Pld | W | D | L | GF | GA | GD | Win % |
|---|---|---|---|---|---|---|---|---|---|---|---|---|
| Ligat Ha'Al | 22 August 2015 | 16 May 2016 | Matchday 1 | 12th | 33 | 7 | 13 | 13 | 38 | 48 | −10 | 21.21 |
| State Cup | 12 January 2016 | 27 January 2016 | Eighth Round | Round of 16 | 2 | 1 | 0 | 1 | 3 | 2 | +1 | 50.00 |
| Toto Cup | 1 August 2015 | 16 December 2015 | Group Stage | Quarter final | 6 | 2 | 1 | 3 | 7 | 5 | +2 | 33.33 |
| Total | | | | | 41 | 10 | 14 | 17 | 48 | 55 | −7 | 24.39 |

Last updated: 16 May 2016.
Source: Competitions

== Ligat Ha'Al ==
=== Results summary ===
| Overall | | | | | | | | Home | | | | | | Away | | | | | |
| Pld | W | D | L | GF | GA | GD | Pts | W | D | L | GF | GA | GD | W | D | L | GF | GA | GD |
|---|---|---|---|---|---|---|---|---|---|---|---|---|---|---|---|---|---|---|---|
| 33 | 7 | 13 | 13 | 38 | 48 | −10 | 34 | 4 | 5 | 7 | 17 | 24 | −7 | 3 | 8 | 6 | 21 | 24 | −3 |

Last updated: 16 May 2016.

=== Results by matchday ===
| Matchday | 1 | 2 | 3 | 4 | 5 | 6 | 7 | 8 | 9 | 10 | 11 | 12 | 13 | 14 | 15 | 16 | 17 | 18 | 19 | 20 | 21 | 22 | 23 | 24 | 25 | 26 | 27 | 28 | 29 | 30 | 31 | 32 | 33 |
|---|---|---|---|---|---|---|---|---|---|---|---|---|---|---|---|---|---|---|---|---|---|---|---|---|---|---|---|---|---|---|---|---|---|
| Ground | A | H | A | H | A | H | H | A | H | A | H | A | H | H | A | H | A | H | A | A | H | A | H | A | H | A | A | H | A | H | A | A | H |
| Result | W | L | D | L | W | L | L | D | W | L | L | D | L | W | D | D | D | W | D | L | D | D | L | L | D | L | L | D | W | W | D | L | D |
| Position | 4 | 9 | 8 | 11 | 8 | 10 | 12 | 13 | 9 | 11 | 13 | 13 | 13 | 12 | 10 | 9 | 9 | 8 | 9 | 11 | 11 | 11 | 13 | 13 | 13 | 13 | 13 | 13 | 13 | 12 | 11 | 12 | 12 |

Updated to match(es) played on 16 May 2016. Source:
A = Away; H = Home; W = Win; D = Draw; L = Loss

=== Regular season ===
Win Draw Loss

| 22 August 2015 Match 1 | Hapoel Acre | 0 - 1 | Hapoel Haifa | Acre |
| 20:00 | Kochav (yellow card) 3'; Khalaila (yellow card) 88' | Report | Dora (yellow card) 23'; Kijanskas 66' | Stadium: Acre; Attendance: 3,000; Referee: Menashe Meshiah |

| 29 August 2015 Match 2 | Hapoel Haifa | 0 - 3 | Maccabi Petah Tikva | Haifa |
| 19:00 | Dora (yellow card) 24' (yellow-red card) 66'; Abu Nil (yellow card) 33'; Kijanskas (yellow card) 73'; Korać (yellow card) 87' | Report | Hugi (yellow card) 4'; Mununga (yellow card) 17'; Kanyuk 25'; Danino (yellow card) 48'; Twito 78'; Melamed 90' | Stadium: Sammy Ofer; Referee: Gal Laibuvitz |

| 12 September 2015 Match 3 | Beitar Jerusalem | 1 - 1 | Hapoel Haifa | Jerusalem |
| 20:00 | Yerucham (yellow card) 60'; Zhairi (yellow card) 72'; Cohen (yellow card) 82'; Atzili 86'; Kachila (yellow card) 90' | Report | El-Khatib (yellow card) 30'; Swisa 41' | Stadium: Teddy; Attendance: 4,000; Referee: Liran Liany |

| 19 September 2015 Match 4 | Hapoel Haifa | 0 - 1 | Hapoel Tel Aviv | Haifa |
| 19:00 | Maman (yellow card) 53'; Korać (yellow card) 80' | Report | Vyntra (yellow card) 38'; Scheimann (yellow card) 44'; Abu Abaid (yellow card) 74'; Safouri 82'; Pintilii (yellow card) 85' | Stadium: Sammy Ofer; Referee: Alon Yefet |

| 26 September 2015 Match 5 | Maccabi Netanya | 1 - 2 | Hapoel Haifa | Netanya |
| 20:00 | Harush (yellow card) 58'; Vered (yellow card) 67'; Margulies 80' | Report | Lala 10'; Serdal (yellow card) 54'; Abu Nil (yellow card) 70'; Maman 75' | Stadium: Netanya; Attendance: 4,500; Referee: Daniel Bar Natan |

| 3 October 2015 Match 6 | Hapoel Haifa | 1 - 4 | Hapoel Ironi Kiryat Shmona | Haifa |
| 19:00 | Maman (yellow card) 60'; Lala 69' | Report | Shamir 41', 59'; Abed 45+1'; Broun (yellow card) 60'; Mizrahi 90+3' | Stadium: Sammy Ofer; Attendance: 2,800; Referee: Shalom Ben Avraham |

| 17 October 2015 Match 7 | Hapoel Haifa | 0 - 1 | Bnei Yehuda Tel Aviv | Haifa |
| 19:00 | Korać (yellow card) 20'; Fishler (yellow card) 65'; Maman (yellow card) 75'; Yazo (yellow card) 79' | Report | Galván 68' | Stadium: Sammy Ofer; Attendance: 2,300; Referee: Gal Leivovich |

| 24 October 2015 Match 8 | Hapoel Kfar Saba | 2 - 2 | Hapoel Haifa | Kfar Saba |
| 19:00 | Kehinde 46'; Mesika 64' | Report | Lala 45+1'; Abu Nil 70'; Dora (yellow card) 78' | Stadium: Levita; Attendance: 3,000; Referee: Menashe Meshiah |

| 31 October 2015 Match 9 | Hapoel Haifa | 2 - 0 | Bnei Sakhnin | Haifa |
| 18:00 | Swisa 21' (yellow card) 48'; Rochet (yellow card) 31'; Kijanskas 54' | Report | Khalaila (yellow card) 41'; Ganayem (yellow card) 43'; Amasha (penalty missed) 51 | Stadium: Sammy Ofer; Attendance: 2,500; Referee: Idan Leiba |

| 9 November 2015 Match 10 | Hapoel Be'er Sheva | 1 - 0 | Hapoel Haifa | Be'er Sheva |
| 20:30 | Hoban (yellow card) 53'; Arbeitman 80' (yellow card) 81' | Report | Dora (yellow card) 17'; Swisa (yellow card) 27' (yellow-red card) 83'; Megrelashvili (yellow card) 41' | Stadium: Turner; Attendance: 15,000; Referee: Eli Hachmon |

| 21 November 2015 Match 11 | Hapoel Haifa | 0 - 3 | Maccabi Tel Aviv | Haifa |
| 17:00 | Dabour (yellow card) 21'; Pinheiro (yellow card) 49'; Malul (yellow card) 51' (red card) 52' | Report | Zahavi 50' (pen.); Igiebor 68'; Rikan 77' | Stadium: Sammy Ofer; Referee: Daniel Bar Natan |

| 28 November 2015 Match 12 | Hapoel Ra'anana | 2 - 2 | Hapoel Haifa | Netanya |
| 18:00 | Vehava (yellow card) 17'; Shoker 31'; Mihelič 38' (red card) 78' | Report | Dora (yellow card) 6'; Rochet (yellow card) 38'; Serdal (yellow card) 40'; Lala 60', 73'; Roash (yellow card) 85' | Stadium: Netanya; Attendance: 500; Referee: Oren Simenian |

| 7 December 2015 Match 13 | Hapoel Haifa | 2 - 4 | Maccabi Haifa | Haifa |
| 20:55 | Stojković 5' (o.g.); Roash (red card) 12'; Swisa 18' (pen.); El-Khatib (yellow card) 21'; Korać (yellow card) 84' | Report | Plet (yellow card) 17', (goal) 90+3'; Keinan (yellow card) 19', (goal) 88'; Atar 41'; Ryan 44' | Stadium: Sammy Ofer; Attendance: 16,750; Referee: Eli Hacmon |

| 12 December 2015 Match 14 | Hapoel Haifa | 3 - 1 | Hapoel Acre | Haifa |
| 18:00 | Megrelashvili (yellow card) 19'; Swisa 24'; Kijanskas 45+2'; Korać 62' | Report | Mishaelof 20' (pen.); Konstantinos (yellow card) 44'; Seiderre (yellow card) 54' | Stadium: Sammy Ofer; Attendance: 1,800; Referee: Liran Vaxberger |

| 19 December 2015 Match 15 | Maccabi Petah Tikva | 1 - 1 | Hapoel Haifa | Tel Aviv |
| 18:30 | Tomas 39' (yellow card) 42'; Rueda (yellow card) 43' | Report | Dora (yellow card) 42'; Lala 46' | Stadium: Bloomfield; Attendance: 1,000; Referee: Menashe Meshiah |

| 26 December 2015 Match 16 | Hapoel Haifa | 1 - 1 | Beitar Jerusalem | Haifa |
| 20:00 | Lala 40'; Korać (yellow card) 56'; Megrelashvili (yellow card) 72' (yellow-red card) 90'; Pinheiro (yellow card) 79' | Report | Claudemir (yellow card) 35'; Rukavytsya 76'; Matović (yellow card) 88' | Stadium: Sammy Ofer; Attendance: 7,300; Referee: Orel Greenfeld |

| 3 January 2016 Match 17 | Hapoel Tel Aviv | 0 - 0 | Hapoel Haifa | Tel Aviv |
| 20:15 | Yehezkel (yellow card) 18'; Vyntra (yellow card) 79'; Verta (yellow card) 83' | Report | | Stadium: Bloomfield; Referee: Eitan Shmuelevich |

| 9 January 2016 Match 18 | Hapoel Haifa | 2 - 0 | Maccabi Netanya | Haifa |
| 18:00 | Elbaz 7'; Lala 37'; Dora (yellow card) 66' | Report | Pires (yellow card) 16'; Vered (yellow card) 35'; Benbenishti (yellow card) 79' | Stadium: Sammy Ofer |

| 16 January 2016 Match 19 | Hapoel Ironi Kiryat Shmona | 1 - 1 | Hapoel Haifa | Kiryat Shmona |
| 18:30 | Maimoni (yellow card) 50'; Amutu 62' | Report | Baha (yellow card) 67'; Pinheiro (yellow card) 74'; Korać 90' | Stadium: Kiryat Shmona Municipal |

| 23 January 2016 Match 20 | Bnei Yehuda Tel Aviv | 1 - 0 | Hapoel Haifa | Tel Aviv |
| 15:00 | Agayev 63' | Report | | Stadium: Bloomfield; Referee: Igal Farid |

| 30 January 2016 Match 21 | Hapoel Haifa | 1 - 1 | Hapoel Kfar Saba | Haifa |
| 18:00 | Dora (yellow card) 14'; Badash 88' (o.g.) | Report | Khawaz (yellow card) 38'; Itzhak 82' | Stadium: Sammy Ofer; Attendance: 2,700; Referee: Orel Grinfeld |

| 6 February 2016 Match 22 | Bnei Sakhnin | 0 - 0 | Hapoel Haifa | Ilut |
| 18:30 | | Report | Dora (yellow card) 20'; Maman (yellow card) 73' | Stadium: Ilut; Attendance: 1,000; Referee: Eitan Shmuelevich |

| 13 February 2016 Match 23 | Hapoel Haifa | 1 - 2 | Hapoel Be'er Sheva | Haifa |
| 17:30 | Elbaz 70'; Rochet (yellow card) 75'; Pinheiro (yellow card) 84' | Report | Barda 35'; Sahar 68' | Stadium: Sammy Ofer; Referee: Menashe Meshiah |

| 20 February 2016 Match 24 | Maccabi Tel Aviv | 2 - 1 | Hapoel Haifa | Tel Aviv |
| 17:45 | Zahavi 72' (pen.); Ben Haim 80' | Report | Baha (yellow card) 42'; Kijanskas (yellow card) 70'; Serdal (yellow card) 72'; Korać 90+2' | Stadium: Bloomfield; Attendance: 11,900; Referee: Eli Hachmon |

| 27 February 2016 Match 25 | Hapoel Haifa | 1 - 1 | Hapoel Ra'anana | Haifa |
| 17:30 | Dora (yellow card) 41'; Korać 88'; Maman (yellow card) 90+4' | Report | Kangwa 49' | Stadium: Sammy Ofer; Attendance: 2,400; Referee: Daniel Bar Natan |

| 6 March 2016 Match 26 | Maccabi Haifa | 3 - 2 | Hapoel Haifa | Haifa |
| 20:30 | Plet 17'; Jaber 40'; Vermouth (yellow card) 62'; Fishler 76' (o.g.); Meshumar (yellow card) 78'; Keinan (yellow card) 90' | Report | Dora (yellow card) 42'; Hisham Kiwan 48', (yellow card) 90'; Tawatha 68' (o.g.); Baha (yellow card) 82'; Maman (red card) 90' | Stadium: Sammy Ofer; Attendance: 22,453; Referee: Roei Rainsriber |

==== Regular season table ====
| Pos | Team | Pld | W | D | L | GF | GA | GD | Pts | Qualification or relegation |
|---|---|---|---|---|---|---|---|---|---|---|
| 10 | Hapoel Acre | 26 | 8 | 5 | 13 | 18 | 36 | −18 | 29 | Qualification for the relegation round |
| 11 | Ironi Kiryat Shmona | 26 | 6 | 10 | 10 | 25 | 31 | −6 | 28 | Qualification for the relegation round |
| 12 | Hapoel Tel Aviv | 26 | 6 | 9 | 11 | 17 | 31 | −14 | 27 | Qualification for the relegation round |
| 13 | Hapoel Haifa | 26 | 5 | 10 | 11 | 27 | 37 | −10 | 25 | Qualification for the relegation round |
| 14 | Maccabi Netanya | 26 | 1 | 8 | 17 | 10 | 37 | −27 | 11 | Qualification for the relegation round |

Source: Israel Football Association, Soccerway
Rules for classification: 1) Points; 2) Goal difference; 3) Matches won; 4) Goals scored; 5) Head-to-head points; 6) Head-to-head goal difference; 7) Head-to-head goals scored; 8) Play-off.

==== Results overview ====
Win Draw Loss

| Opposition | Home score | Away score |
|---|---|---|
| Beitar Jerusalem | 1 - 1 | 1 - 1 |
| Bnei Sakhnin | 2 - 0 | 0 - 0 |
| Bnei Yehuda Tel Aviv | 0 - 1 | 0 - 1 |
| Hapoel Acre | 3 - 1 | 1 - 0 |
| Hapoel Be'er Sheva | 1 - 2 | 0 - 1 |
| Hapoel Ra'anana | 1 - 1 | 2 - 2 |
| Hapoel Ironi Kiryat Shmona | 1 - 4 | 1 - 1 |
| Hapoel Kfar Saba | 1 - 1 | 2 - 2 |
| Hapoel Tel Aviv | 0 - 1 | 0 - 0 |
| Maccabi Haifa | 2 - 4 | 2 - 3 |
| Maccabi Netanya | 2 - 0 | 2 - 1 |
| Maccabi Petah Tikva | 0 - 3 | 1 - 1 |
| Maccabi Tel Aviv | 0 - 3 | 1 - 2 |

=== Play-off ===
| 19 March 2016 Match 27 | Maccabi Petah Tikva | 2 - 1 | Hapoel Haifa | Petah Tikva |
| 17:00 | Danino (yellow card) 23'; Kanyuk (yellow card) 45'; Gordana 67'; Goldenberg 74' | Report | Dora (yellow card) 19'; Baha (yellow card) 76'; Allyson 84' (o.g.); Pinheiro (yellow card) 90'; Arbeitman (yellow card) 90+4' | Stadium: HaMoshava; Referee: Ziv Adler |

| 3 April 2016 Match 28 | Hapoel Haifa | 0 - 0 | Hapoel Kfar Saba | Haifa |
| 19:00 | Korać (yellow card) 52'; Megrelashvili (yellow card) 85' | Report | Cohen (yellow card) 37'; Khawaz (yellow card) 48'; Cohen (yellow card) 88' | Stadium: Sammy Ofer; Referee: Liran Vaxberger |

| 9 April 2016 Match 29 | Hapoel Acre | 2 - 3 | Hapoel Haifa | Acre |
| 19:15 | Kasoum (yellow card) 19'; Malul (yellow card) 25'; Tzemah (yellow card) 64'; Peretz (yellow card) 77'; Kehinde 81', 88' | Report | Baha (yellow card) 13'; Lala 26', 67'; Maman (yellow card) 53'; Plakuschenko 71'; Pinheiro (yellow card) 80' | Stadium: Acre; Referee: Eli Hachmon |

| 16 April 2016 Match 30 | Hapoel Haifa | 2 - 1 | Maccabi Netanya | Haifa |
| 18:00 | Arbeitman 17'; Plakuschenko 33'; Baha (yellow card) 82' | Report | Mischenko 5'; Cohen (yellow card) 10' | Stadium: Sammy Ofer; Attendance: 3,900; Referee: Orel Grinfeld |

| 30 April 2016 Match 31 | Hapoel Tel Aviv | 3 - 3 | Hapoel Haifa | Tel Aviv |
| 20:15 | Altman (yellow card) 8'; Schoenfeld 11'; Yehezkel 43', 52' | Report | Arbeitman 45+1', 57'; Plakuschenko 48'; Dora (yellow card) 51' | Stadium: Bloomfield; Referee: Ziv Adler |

| 7 May 2016 Match 32 | Hapoel Ironi Kiryat Shmona | 2 - 1 | Hapoel Haifa | Kiryat Shmona |
| 20:00 | Amutu (yellow card) 10' (goal) 90+2'; Abed 61'; Ostvind (yellow card) 75'; Haimov (yellow card) 79' | Report | Serdal (yellow card) 22'; Dora (yellow card) 75'; Kijanskas (yellow card) 83'; Lala 90+4' | Stadium: Kiryat Shmona Municipal; Referee: Roei Rainshraiber |

| 16 May 2016 Match 33 | Hapoel Haifa | 1 - 1 | Bnei Yehuda Tel Aviv | Haifa |
| 20:00 | Arbeitman 77' | Report | Agayev 53'; Nworuh (yellow card) 65' | Stadium: Sammy Ofer; Referee: Orel Grinfeld |

==== Relegation round table ====
| Pos | Team | Pld | W | D | L | GF | GA | GD | Pts | Relegation |
|---|---|---|---|---|---|---|---|---|---|---|
| 7 | Maccabi Petah Tikva | 33 | 13 | 7 | 13 | 34 | 35 | −1 | 46 | |
| 8 | Bnei Yehuda | 33 | 13 | 7 | 13 | 37 | 43 | −6 | 46 | |
| 9 | Hapoel Tel Aviv | 33 | 10 | 12 | 11 | 30 | 37 | −7 | 42 | |
| 10 | Hapoel Kfar Saba | 33 | 9 | 11 | 13 | 23 | 37 | −14 | 38 | |
| 11 | Ironi Kiryat Shmona | 33 | 8 | 12 | 13 | 32 | 39 | −7 | 36 | |
| 12 | Hapoel Haifa | 33 | 7 | 13 | 13 | 38 | 48 | −10 | 34 | |
| 13 | Hapoel Acre (R) | 33 | 9 | 7 | 17 | 27 | 48 | −21 | 34 | Relegation to Liga Leumit |
| 14 | Maccabi Netanya (R) | 33 | 1 | 9 | 23 | 14 | 50 | −36 | 12 | Relegation to Liga Leumit |

Source: Israel Football Association, Soccerway
Rules for classification: 1) Points; 2) Goal difference; 3) Matches won; 4) Goals scored; 5) Head-to-head points; 6) Head-to-head goal difference; 7) Head-to-head goals scored; 8) Play-off.
(R) Relegated

==== Results overview ====
Win Draw Loss

| Opposition | Home score | Away score |
|---|---|---|
| Bnei Yehuda Tel Aviv | 1 - 1 | |
| Hapoel Acre | | 3 - 2 |
| Hapoel Ironi Kiryat Shmona | | 1 - 2 |
| Hapoel Kfar Saba | 0 - 0 | |
| Hapoel Tel Aviv | | 3 - 3 |
| Maccabi Netanya | 2 - 1 | |
| Maccabi Petah Tikva | | 1 - 2 |

== Cup ==
=== Round of 32 ===
| 12 January 2016 round of 32 | Hapoel Haifa | 3 - 1 | Maccabi Jaffa | Haifa |
| 19:00 | Korać 61'; Elbaz 72'; Maman 76' (yellow card) 77' | Report | Tzagay 41' (yellow card) 45'; Daniel (yellow card) 62'; Sulimanov (yellow card) 64' | Stadium: Sammy Ofer; Attendance: 1,200 |

=== Round of 16 ===
| 27 January 2016 Round of 16 | Maccabi Haifa | 1 - 0 | Hapoel Haifa | Haifa |
| 21:00 | Plet 5'; Lavi (yellow card) 21'; Ben David (yellow card) 40' | Report | Dora (yellow card) 23'; Pinheiro (yellow card) 71' | Stadium: Sammy Ofer; Attendance: 18,201; Referee: Liran Liany |

== Toto Cup ==
| Pos | Team | Pld | W | D | L | GF | GA | GD | Pts |
|---|---|---|---|---|---|---|---|---|---|
| 1 | Maccabi Haifa (A) | 4 | 4 | 0 | 0 | 8 | 2 | +6 | 12 |
| 2 | Ironi Kiryat Shmona (A) | 4 | 3 | 0 | 1 | 6 | 3 | +3 | 9 |
| 3 | Hapoel Haifa (A) | 4 | 2 | 0 | 2 | 6 | 3 | +3 | 6 |
| 4 | Bnei Sakhnin | 4 | 0 | 1 | 3 | 3 | 8 | −5 | 1 |
| 5 | Hapoel Acre | 4 | 0 | 1 | 3 | 2 | 9 | −7 | 1 |

Updated to match(es) played on 28 October 2015. Source: football.org.il (in Hebrew)
Rules for classification: 1st points; 2nd goal difference; 3rd matches won; 4th goals scored; 5th head-to-head; 6th decision match
(A) Advanced to the quarter finals

=== Group stage ===
| 1 August 2015 1 | Maccabi Haifa | 2 - 1 | Hapoel Haifa | Haifa |
| 19:00 | Drinčić (yellow card) 17'; Ryan (yellow card) 54'; Yadin (yellow card) 56'; Turgeman 67'; Meshumar 71'; Benayoun (yellow card) 86' | Report | Swisa (penalty missed) 18', 49'; Dabour (yellow card) 67' | Stadium: Sammy Ofer; Attendance: 22,457; Referee: Eli Hakmon |

| 5 August 2015 2 | Hapoel Haifa | 3 - 0 | Hapoel Acre | Haifa |
| 20:50 | Musa (yellow card) 22'; Roash (yellow card) 43'; Swisa 51' (pen.); Kijanskas (yellow card) 66'; Abu Nil (yellow card) 72' (goal) 86', 90' | Report | Seiderre (yellow card) 31'; Mishaelof (red card) 50'; Tzemah (yellow card) 88' | Stadium: Sammy Ofer |

| 10 August 2015 3 | Hapoel Ironi Kiryat Shmona | 1 - 0 | Hapoel Haifa | Kiryat Shmona |
| 20:50 | Bruno 30'; Shamir (yellow card) 45'; Broun (yellow card) 61' | Report | Dora (yellow card) 60'; Korać (yellow card) 84'; Maman (yellow card) 85' | Stadium: Kiryat Shmona Municipal |

| 16 August 2015 5 | Hapoel Haifa | 2 - 0 | Bnei Sakhnin | Haifa |
| 20:50 | Lala (yellow card) 26'; Dabour 44'; Maman 54' (pen.); El-Khatib (yellow card) 88'; Roash (yellow card) 88' | Report | Elihen (yellow card) 8'; Kachuba (yellow card) 21'; Khalaila (yellow card) 39' | Stadium: Sammy Ofer |

=== Quarter final ===
| 2 December 2015 first leg | Hapoel Haifa | 0 - 1 | Hapoel Ironi Kiryat Shmona | Acre |
| 20:50 | Kijanskas (yellow card) 36' | Report | Abed 20'; Maimon (yellow card) 55' | Stadium: Acre |

| 16 December 2015 second leg | Hapoel Ironi Kiryat Shmona | 1 - 1 (2 – 1 agg.) | Hapoel Haifa | Kiryat Shmona |
| | Serdal 80' (o.g.); Kassio (yellow card) 90' | Report | Kijanskas (yellow card) 8'; Elbaz (yellow card) 37' (goal) 81'; Swisa (yellow card) 90+4' | Stadium: Kiryat Shmona Municipal |

== Statistics ==
=== Appearances and goals ===
| No. | Pos | Nat | Player | Total | | Ligat Ha'Al | | State Cup | | Toto Cup | |
| No. | Pos | Nat | Player | Apps | Goals | Apps | Goals | Apps | Goals | Apps | Goals |
|---|---|---|---|---|---|---|---|---|---|---|---|
| 1 | GK | (Israel) ISR | Niv Antman | 18 | 0 | 12 | 0 | 2 | 0 | 4 | 0 |
| 2 | DF | (Lithuania) LTU | Tadas Kijanskas | 37 | 3 | 30 | 3 | 1 | 0 | 6 | 0 |
| 3 | DF | (Israel) ISR | Haim Megrelashvili | 34 | 0 | 29 | 0 | 1 | 0 | 4 | 0 |
| 4 | DF | (Israel) ISR | Dor Malul | 22 | 0 | 21 | 0 | 1 | 0 | 0 | 0 |
| 5 | DF | (Israel) ISR | Ofek Fishler | 7 | 0 | 5 | 0 | 0 | 0 | 2 | 0 |
| 6 | DF | (Israel) ISR | Miki Yazo | 16 | 0 | 10 | 0 | 1 | 0 | 5 | 0 |
| 7 | MF | (Israel) ISR | Ahad Azam | 0 | 0 | 0 | 0 | 0 | 0 | 0 | 0 |
| 8 | MF | (Israel) ISR | Hisham Kiwan | 17 | 1 | 15 | 1 | 1 | 0 | 1 | 0 |
| 9 | FW | (Israel) ISR | Tomer Swisa | 36 | 6 | 29 | 4 | 2 | 0 | 5 | 2 |
| 10 | MF | (Israel) ISR | Ido Vaier | 1 | 0 | 0 | 0 | 0 | 0 | 1 | 0 |
| 11 | FW | (Israel) ISR | Mahran Lala | 36 | 11 | 29 | 11 | 2 | 0 | 5 | 0 |
| 12 | FW | (Israel) ISR | Amir Abu Nil | 15 | 3 | 11 | 1 | 1 | 0 | 3 | 2 |
| 14 | FW | (Israel) ISR | Eli Elbaz | 21 | 4 | 17 | 2 | 1 | 1 | 3 | 1 |
| 15 | MF | (Israel) ISR | Hanan Maman | 35 | 3 | 29 | 1 | 2 | 1 | 4 | 1 |
| 16 | DF | (Portugal) POR | Bruno Pinheiro | 37 | 0 | 30 | 0 | 2 | 0 | 5 | 0 |
| 18 | FW | (Israel) ISR | Shlomi Arbeitman | 12 | 4 | 12 | 4 | 0 | 0 | 0 | 0 |
| 19 | FW | (Israel) ISR | Idan Golan | 4 | 0 | 1 | 0 | 0 | 0 | 3 | 0 |
| 21 | DF | (Israel) ISR | Oshri Roash | 25 | 0 | 19 | 0 | 1 | 0 | 5 | 0 |
| 22 | FW | (Israel) ISR | Aner Shechter | 2 | 0 | 0 | 0 | 0 | 0 | 2 | 0 |
| 23 | MF | (Israel) ISR | Adrian Rochet | 30 | 0 | 26 | 0 | 2 | 0 | 2 | 0 |
| 24 | DF | (Israel) ISR | Liran Serdal | 31 | 0 | 24 | 0 | 1 | 0 | 6 | 0 |
| 25 | FW | (Montenegro) MNE | Žarko Korać | 34 | 5 | 26 | 4 | 2 | 1 | 6 | 0 |
| 26 | MF | (Israel) ISR | Yossi Dora | 35 | 0 | 27 | 0 | 2 | 0 | 6 | 0 |
| 28 | MF | (Israel) ISR | Maxim Plakuschenko | 6 | 3 | 5 | 3 | 0 | 0 | 1 | 0 |
| 30 | GK | (Croatia) CRO | Marijan Antolović | 10 | 0 | 10 | 0 | 0 | 0 | 0 | 0 |
| 55 | MF | (Belarus) BLR | Dzmitry Baha | 16 | 0 | 14 | 0 | 2 | 0 | 0 | 0 |
Players away from Hapoel Haifa on loan:
| 10 | GK | (Israel) ISR | Rotem Fadida | 0 | 0 | 0 | 0 | 0 | 0 | 0 | 0 |
| 12 | DF | (Israel) ISR | Oren Bitton | 0 | 0 | 0 | 0 | 0 | 0 | 0 | 0 |
| 17 | MF | (Israel) ISR | Anas Dabour | 17 | 1 | 11 | 0 | 0 | 0 | 6 | 1 |
| | MF | (Israel) ISR | Gateon Triko | 0 | 0 | 0 | 0 | 0 | 0 | 0 | 0 |
Players who appeared for Hapoel Haifa that left during the season:
| 13 | GK | (Czech Republic) CZE | Přemysl Kovář | 15 | 0 | 11 | 0 | 1 | 0 | 3 | 0 |
| 18 | FW | (Israel) ISR | Ali El-Khatib | 13 | 0 | 10 | 0 | 0 | 0 | 3 | 0 |
| 20 | DF | (Israel) ISR | Niv Serdal | 1 | 0 | 0 | 0 | 0 | 0 | 1 | 0 |
| | MF | (Israel) ISR | Hilal Musa | 3 | 0 | 0 | 0 | 0 | 0 | 3 | 0 |
| | DF | (Ghana) GHA | Derik Bonae | 0 | 0 | 0 | 0 | 0 | 0 | 0 | 0 |

=== Goalscorers ===
| Rank | No. | Pos | Nat | Name | Ligat Ha'Al | State Cup | Toto Cup | Total |
|---|---|---|---|---|---|---|---|---|
| 1 | 11 | FW | (Israel) | Mahran Lala | 11 | 0 | 0 | 11 |
| 2 | 9 | FW | (Israel) | Tomer Swisa | 4 | 0 | 2 | 6 |
| 3 | 25 | FW | (Montenegro) | Žarko Korać | 4 | 1 | 0 | 5 |
| 4 | 18 | FW | (Israel) | Shlomi Arbeitman | 4 | 0 | 0 | 4 |
| 4 | 14 | FW | (Israel) | Eli Elbaz | 2 | 1 | 1 | 4 |
| 6 | 2 | DF | (Lithuania) | Tadas Kijanskas | 3 | 0 | 0 | 3 |
| 6 | 28 | MF | (Israel) | Maxim Plakuschenko | 3 | 0 | 0 | 3 |
| 6 | 15 | MF | (Israel) | Hanan Maman | 1 | 1 | 1 | 3 |
| 6 | 12 | FW | (Israel) | Amir Abu Nil | 1 | 0 | 2 | 3 |
| 10 | 8 | MF | (Israel) | Hisham Kiwan | 1 | 0 | 0 | 1 |
| 10 | 17 | MF | (Israel) | Anas Dabour | 0 | 0 | 1 | 1 |
| Own goal | | | | | 4 | 0 | 0 | 4 |
| Totals | | | | | 38 | 3 | 7 | 48 |

Last updated: 16 May 2016

=== Assists ===
| Rank | No. | Pos | Nat | Name | Ligat Ha'Al | State Cup | Toto Cup | Total |
|---|---|---|---|---|---|---|---|---|
| 1 | 15 | MF | (Israel) | Hanan Maman | 6 | 0 | 1 | 7 |
| 2 | 4 | FW | (Israel) | Tomer Swisa | 6 | 0 | 0 | 6 |
| 3 | 11 | FW | (Israel) | Mahran Lala | 2 | 0 | 0 | 2 |
| 3 | 16 | DF | (Portugal) | Bruno Pinheiro | 2 | 0 | 0 | 2 |
| 3 | 26 | MF | (Israel) | Yossi Dora | 2 | 0 | 0 | 2 |
| 3 | 28 | MF | (Israel) | Maxim Plakuschenko | 2 | 0 | 0 | 2 |
| 3 | 25 | FW | (Montenegro) | Žarko Korać | 1 | 1 | 0 | 2 |
| 8 | 3 | DF | (Israel) | Haim Megrelashvili | 1 | 0 | 0 | 1 |
| 8 | 4 | DF | (Israel) | Dor Malul | 1 | 0 | 0 | 1 |
| 8 | 8 | MF | (Israel) | Hisham Kiwan | 1 | 0 | 0 | 1 |
| 8 | 21 | DF | (Israel) | Oshri Roash | 1 | 0 | 0 | 1 |
| 8 | 24 | DF | (Israel) | Liran Serdal | 1 | 0 | 0 | 1 |
| 8 | 6 | DF | (Israel) | Miki Yazo | 0 | 1 | 0 | 1 |
| Totals | | | | | 26 | 2 | 1 | 29 |

Last updated: 16 May 2016

=== Clean sheets ===
Updated on 16 May 2016

| Rank | Pos. | No. | Name | Ligat Ha'Al | State Cup | Toto Cup | Total |
|---|---|---|---|---|---|---|---|
| 1 | GK | 1 | (Israel) Niv Antman | 4 | 0 | 1 | 5 |
| 2 | GK | 13 | (Czech Republic) Přemysl Kovář | 1 | 0 | 1 | 2 |
| 3 | GK | 30 | (Croatia) Marijan Antolović | 1 | 0 | 0 | 1 |
| Totals | | | | 6 | 0 | 2 | 8 |

=== Disciplinary record ===
Updated on 16 May 2016

| No. | Pos | Nat | Name | Ligat Ha'Al | | | State Cup | | | Toto Cup | | | Total | | |
| No. | Pos | Nat | Name | Yellow card | (yellow card) (yellow-red card) | Red card | Yellow card | (yellow card) (yellow-red card) | Red card | Yellow card | (yellow card) (yellow-red card) | Red card | Yellow card | (yellow card) (yellow-red card) | Red card |
| 26 | MF | (Israel) | Yossi Dora | 13 | 1 | | 1 | | | 1 | | | 15 | 1 | |
| 15 | MF | (Israel) | Hanan Maman | 6 | | 1 | 1 | | | 1 | | | 8 | | 1 |
| 16 | DF | (Portugal) | Bruno Pinheiro | 6 | | | 1 | | | | | | 7 | | |
| 55 | MF | (Belarus) | Dzmitry Baha | 6 | | | | | | | | | 6 | | |
| 25 | FW | (Montenegro) | Žarko Korać | 5 | | | | | | 1 | | | 6 | | |
| 2 | DF | (Lithuania) | Tadas Kijanskas | 3 | | | | | | 3 | | | 6 | | |
| 21 | DF | (Israel) | Oshri Roash | 1 | | 1 | | | | 2 | | | 3 | | 1 |
| 3 | DF | (Israel) | Haim Megrelashvili | 3 | 1 | | | | | | | | 3 | 1 | |
| 24 | DF | (Israel) | Liran Serdal | 4 | | | | | | | | | 4 | | |
| 9 | FW | (Israel) | Tomer Swisa | 1 | 1 | | | | | 1 | | | 2 | 1 | |
| 23 | MF | (Israel) | Adrian Rochet | 3 | | | | | | | | | 3 | | |
| 12 | FW | (Israel) | Amir Abu Nil | 2 | | | | | | 1 | | | 3 | | |
| 18 | FW | (Israel) | Ali El-Khatib | 2 | | | | | | 1 | | | 3 | | |
| 17 | MF | (Israel) | Anas Dabour | 1 | | | | | | 1 | | | 2 | | |
| 4 | DF | (Israel) | Dor Malul | | 1 | | | | | | | | | 1 | |
| 5 | DF | (Israel) | Ofek Fishler | 1 | | | | | | | | | 1 | | |
| 6 | DF | (Israel) | Miki Yazo | 1 | | | | | | | | | 1 | | |
| 8 | MF | (Israel) | Hisham Kiwan | 1 | | | | | | | | | 1 | | |
| 18 | FW | (Israel) | Shlomi Arbeitman | 1 | | | | | | | | | 1 | | |
| 11 | FW | (Israel) | Mahran Lala | | | | | | | 1 | | | 1 | | |
| 14 | FW | (Israel) | Eli Elbaz | | | | | | | 1 | | | 1 | | |
| | MF | (Israel) | Hilal Musa | | | | | | | 1 | | | 1 | | |

=== Suspensions ===
Updated on 21 May 2018

| Player | Date Received | Offence | Length of suspension | | |
|---|---|---|---|---|---|
| Yossi Dora | 29 August 2015 | (yellow card) 24' (yellow-red card) 66' vs Maccabi Petah Tikva | 1 Match | Beitar Jerusalem (A) | 12 September 2015 |
| Tomer Swisa | 9 November 2015 | (yellow card) 27' (yellow-red card) 83' vs Hapoel Be'er Sheva | 1 Match | Maccabi Tel Aviv (H) | 21 November 2015 |
| Dor Malul | 21 November 2015 | (yellow card) 51' (red card) 52' vs Maccabi Tel Aviv | 1 Match | Hapoel Ra'anana (A) | 28 November 2015 |
| Oshri Roash | 7 December 2015 | (red card) 12' vs Maccabi Haifa | 1 Match | Hapoel Acre (H) | 12 December 2015 |
| Yossi Dora | 19 December 2015 | (yellow card) 42' vs Maccabi Petah Tikva | 1 Match | Hapoel Tel Aviv (A) | 3 January 2016 |
| Žarko Korać | 26 December 2015 | (yellow card) 56' vs Beitar Jerusalem | 1 Match | Maccabi Netanya (H) | 9 January 2016 |
| Haim Megrelashvili | 26 December 2015 | (yellow card) 72' (yellow-red card) 90' vs Beitar Jerusalem | 1 Match | Hapoel Tel Aviv (A) | 3 January 2016 |
| Bruno Pinheiro | 13 February 2016 | (yellow card) 84' vs Hapoel Be'er Sheva | 1 Match | Hapoel Ra'anana (H) | 27 February 2016 |
| Hanan Maman | 6 March 2016 | (red card) 90' vs Maccabi Haifa | 1 Match | Maccabi Petah Tikva (A) | 19 March 2016 |
| Yossi Dora | 19 March 2016 | (yellow card) 19' vs Maccabi Petah Tikva | 1 Match | Hapoel Acre (A) | 9 April 2016 |
| Dzmitry Baha | 9 April 2016 | (yellow card) 13' vs Hapoel Acre | 1 Match | Hapoel Tel Aviv (A) | 30 April 2016 |

=== Penalties ===
Updated on 16 May 2016

| Date | Penalty Taker | Scored | Opponent | Competition |
|---|---|---|---|---|
| 1.8.2015 | Tomer Swisa | No | Maccabi Haifa | Toto Cup |
| 5.8.2015 | Tomer Swisa | Yes | Hapoel Acre | Toto Cup |
| 16.8.2015 | Hanan Maman | Yes | Bnei Sakhnin | Toto Cup |
| 7.12.2015 | Tomer Swisa | Yes | Maccabi Haifa | Ligat Ha'Al |

=== Overall ===
| | Total | Home | Away | Natural |
|---|---|---|---|---|
| Games played | 41 | 20 | 21 | - |
| Games won | 10 | 7 | 3 | - |
| Games drawn | 14 | 5 | 9 | - |
| Games lost | 17 | 8 | 9 | - |
| Biggest win | 3 - 0 vs Hapoel Acre | 3 - 0 vs Hapoel Acre | 3 - 2 vs Hapoel Acre | - |
| Biggest loss | 1 - 4 vs Hapoel Ironi Kiryat Shmona | 1 - 4 vs Hapoel Ironi Kiryat Shmona | 2 - 3 vs Maccabi Haifa | - |
| Biggest win (League) | 2 - 0 vs Bnei Sakhnin; 2 - 0 vs Maccabi Netanya | 2 - 0 vs Bnei Sakhnin; 2 - 0 vs Maccabi Netanya | 3 - 2 vs Hapoel Acre | - |
| Biggest loss (League) | 1 - 4 vs Hapoel Ironi Kiryat Shmona | 1 - 4 vs Hapoel Ironi Kiryat Shmona | 2 - 3 vs Maccabi Haifa | - |
| Biggest win (Cup) | 3 - 1 vs Maccabi Jaffa | 3 - 1 vs Maccabi Jaffa | - | - |
| Biggest loss (Cup) | 0 - 1 vs Maccabi Haifa | - | 0 - 1 vs Maccabi Haifa | - |
| Biggest win (Toto) | 3 - 0 vs Hapoel Acre | 3 - 0 vs Hapoel Acre | - | - |
| Biggest loss (Toto) | 1 - 2 vs Maccabi Haifa | 0 - 1 vs Hapoel Ironi Kiryat Shmona | 1 - 2 vs Maccabi Haifa | - |
| Goals scored | 48 | 25 | 23 | - |
| Goals conceded | 55 | 26 | 29 | - |
| Goal difference | -7 | -1 | -6 | - |
| Clean sheets | 8 | 5 | 3 | - |
| Average GF per game | 1.17 | 1.25 | 1.1 | - |
| Average GA per game | 1.34 | 1.3 | 1.38 | - |
| Yellow cards | 85 | 42 | 43 | - |
| Red cards | 6 | 4 | 2 | - |
| Most appearances | (Lithuania) Tadas Kijanskas, (Portugal) Bruno Pinheiro (37) | | | |
| Most goals | (Israel) Mahran Lala (11) | | | |
| Most Assist | (Israel) Hanan Maman (7) | | | |
| Penalties for | 4 | 3 | 1 | - |
| Penalties against | 4 | 3 | 1 | - |
| Winning rate | 24.39% | 35% | 14.29% | - |

Last updated: Updated on 16 May 2016
Source: Competitive matches
