= List of Israeli football transfers summer 2018 =

This is a list of Israeli football transfers for the 2018 Summer Transfer Window

== Ligat Ha'Al ==
=== Beitar Jerusalem ===
In:

No.	Pos.	Nation	Player
—	GK	ISR	Itamar Nitzan (from Ironi Kiryat Shmona)
—	DF	ESP	Carlos Cuéllar (from Ironi Kiryat Shmona)
—	DF	ISR	Dean Akafi (from Beitar Tel Aviv Ramla)
—	DF	ISR	Matan Peleg (from Hapoel Rishon LeZion)
—	FW	ISR	Or Inbrom (on loan from (Belgium) Gent)

Out:

No.	Pos.	Nation	Player
—	GK	ISR	Stav Shushan (on loan to Sektzia Nes Tziona)
—	DF	ISR	Hen Dilmoni (to Hapoel Haifa)
—	DF	ISR	Sean Goldberg (loan return to Maccabi Tel Aviv)
—	DF	GER	Marcel Heister (to (Hungary) Ferencváros)
—	MF	ISR	Hen Ezra (to Hapoel Be'er Sheva)
—	FW	ISR	Itay Shechter (to Maccabi Tel Aviv)

=== Bnei Yehuda ===
In:

No.	Pos.	Nation	Player

Out:

No.	Pos.	Nation	Player
—	GK	ISR	Assaf Raz (to Hapoel Iksal)
—	DF	ISR	Ayid Habshi (loan return to Maccabi Haifa)
—	MF	ISR	Yonatan Cohen (loan return to Maccabi Tel Aviv)
—	MF	CRO	Roei Gordana (to (Croatia) Slaven Belupo)
—	FW	ISR	Matan Hozez (loan return to Maccabi Tel Aviv)
—	FW	LTU	Nerijus Valskis (to (Thailand) Ratchaburi Mitr Phol)

=== Bnei Sakhnin ===
In:

No.	Pos.	Nation	Player
—	DF	KOS	Alban Pnishi (from (Switzerland) Grasshopper Club Zürich)
—	MF	ISR	Maharan Radi (from Hapoel Be'er Sheva)
—	MF	ISR	Yisrael Zaguri (loan return from Hapoel Ashkelon)
—	FW	ISR	Mohammed Kalibat (loan return from Hapoel Ra'anana)

Out:

No.	Pos.	Nation	Player
—	DF	PLE	Ala'a Abu Saleh (from Hapoel Iksal)
—	DF	ESP	Abraham Paz (Retired)

=== F.C. Ashdod ===
In:

No.	Pos.	Nation	Player
—	FW	ISR	Dudu Biton (from Hapoel Acre)

Out:

No.	Pos.	Nation	Player
—	DF	BLR	Egor Filipenko (loan return to Maccabi Tel Aviv)
—	DF	ISR	Shahar Piben (loan return to Maccabi Tel Aviv)
—	DF	ISR	Idan Mikdash (to Hapoel Umm al-Fahm)
—	DF	ISR	Amit Bitton (loan return to Hapoel Be'er Sheva)
—	MF	ISR	Moshe Ohayon (Retired)
—	FW	ISR	Dor Jan (loan return to Maccabi Tel Aviv)
—	FW	ISR	Or Inbrom (to Beitar Jerusalem, his player card still belongs to (Belgium) Gent)

=== Hapoel Be'er Sheva ===
In:

No.	Pos.	Nation	Player
—	GK	GRE	Giannis Anestis (from (Greece) AEK Athens)
—	DF	ISR	Samuel Scheimann (from Hapoel Haifa)
—	DF	ISR	Amit Bitton (loan return from F.C. Ashdod)
—	DF	FRA	Julien Cétout (from (France) AS Nancy)
—	MF	ISR	Hen Ezra (from Beitar Jerusalem)

Out:

No.	Pos.	Nation	Player
—	MF	ISR	Maharan Radi (to Bnei Sakhnin)
—	FW	ISR	Elyaniv Barda (Retired)
—	FW	ISR	Itamar Shviro (on loan to Hapoel Rishon LeZion)

=== Hapoel Hadera ===
In:

No.	Pos.	Nation	Player
—	DF	ISR	Wesam Rabah (from Hapoel Rishon LeZion)
—	DF	ISR	Or Dadya (on loan from Hapoel Be'er Sheva)
—	DF	ISR	Maxim Grechkin (on loan from Maccabi Tel Aviv)
—	MF	ISR	Mohammad Abu Fani (from Hapoel Ramat Gan, his player card still belongs to Maccabi Haifa)
—	MF	ISR	Thomas Prince (on loan from Maccabi Tel Aviv)
—	FW	BRA	Lúcio Maranhão (from (Portugal) Arouca)

Out:

No.	Pos.	Nation	Player
—	DF	ISR	Lenny Aharon (to Hapoel Kfar Saba, his player card still belongs to Maccabi Netanya)
—	MF	ISR	Eden Dahan (to Hapoel Marmorek, his player card still belongs to Ironi Kiryat Shmona)
—	FW	ISR	Ohad Kadousi (to Maccabi Yavne)

=== Hapoel Haifa ===
In:

No.	Pos.	Nation	Player
—	DF	ISR	Hen Dilmoni (from Beitar Jerusalem)
—	MF	ISR	Roei Shukrani (from Hapoel Ra'anana)
—	MF	ISR	Ness Zamir (from Hapoel Petah Tikva)
—	FW	ISR	Eli Elbaz (from (Greece) Apollon Smyrnis)

Out:

No.	Pos.	Nation	Player
—	DF	ISR	Samuel Scheimann (to Hapoel Be'er Sheva)
—	MF	ISR	Roslan Barsky (loan return to Maccabi Tel Aviv)
—	FW	ISR	Alon Turgeman (to Austria Wien)
—	FW	ISR	Aner Shechter (on loan to Hapoel Afula)

=== Hapoel Ra'anana ===
In:

No.	Pos.	Nation	Player
—	GK	ISR	Niv Antman (from Ironi Nesher)
—	DF	ISR	Omer Vered (from Hapoel Petah Tikva)
—	DF	ISR	Dean Maimoni (from Hapoel Ra'anana)
—	MF	CRO	Mirko Oremuš (from Hapoel Ashkelon)
—	MF	ISR	Tal Ayela (from Hapoel Ashkelon)

Out:

No.	Pos.	Nation	Player
—	DF	GUI	Mohamed Aly Camara (to (Switzerland) BSC Young Boys)
—	MF	ISR	Or Dasa (loan return to Maccabi Tel Aviv)
—	MF	ISR	Roei Shukrani (to Hapoel Haifa)
—	FW	ISR	Roei Zikri (to Hapoel Tel Aviv)
—	FW	ISR	Shimon Abuhatzira (to Ironi Kiryat Shmona)
—	FW	ISR	Mohammed Kalibat (loan return to Bnei Sakhnin)
—	FW	ISR	Eli Babayev (to (Azerbaijan) Sumgayit FK)
—	FW	ISR	Tomer Swisa (to Hapoel Afula)

=== Hapoel Tel Aviv ===
In:

No.	Pos.	Nation	Player
—	GK	ISR	Robi Levkovich (from Hapoel Petah Tikva)
—	MF	ISR	Raz Cohen (from Hapoel Kfar Saba)
—	MF	BRA	Roger (from (Brazil) Atlético Mineiro)
—	MF	ISR	Yarin Peretz (from Beitar Nes Tubruk)
—	FW	ISR	Roei Zikri (from Hapoel Ra'anana)
—	FW	ISR	Ahmed Abed (from (Turkey) Giresunspor)

Out:

No.	Pos.	Nation	Player
—	DF	ISR	Israel Rosh (to Hapoel Ramat Gan)
—	DF	ISR	Raz Nachmias (on loan to Hapoel Ramat Gan)

=== Ironi Kiryat Shmona ===
In:

No.	Pos.	Nation	Player
—	GK	ISR	Gad Amos (from Maccabi Ahi Nazareth)
—	DF	ISR	Yuval Spungin (from Maccabi Tel Aviv)
—	DF	ISR	Niran Rotstein (from Ironi Tiberias)
—	DF	ISR	Uri Magbo (from Maccabi Petah Tikva)
—	FW	BRA	Lucas Serafim (on loan from (Czech Republic) Bohemians 1905)
—	FW	TTO	Levi García (from (Netherlands) AZ Alkmaar)
—	FW	ISR	Shimon Abuhatzira (from Hapoel Ra'anana)
—	FW	ISR	Yoel Abuhatzira (from Hapoel Herzliya)

Out:

No.	Pos.	Nation	Player
—	GK	ISR	Itamar Nitzan (to Beitar Jerusalem)
—	DF	ESP	Carlos Cuéllar (to Beitar Jerusalem)
—	DF	ISR	Sun Menahem (loan return to Maccabi Haifa)
—	MF	CIV	Didier Brossou (to Maccabi Petah Tikva)
—	FW	ISR	Shoval Gozlan (to Maccabi Netanya)

=== Maccabi Haifa ===
In:

No.	Pos.	Nation	Player
12	DF	ISR	Sun Menahem (loan return from Ironi Kiryat Shmona)
14	MF	CMR	Georges Mandjeck (on loan from Sparta Prague)
15	DF	ISR	Ofri Arad (loan return from Hapoel Ramat Gan)
21	DF	ISR	Ayid Habshi (loan return from Bnei Yehua)
24	DF	ISR	Yahav Gurfinkel (loan return from Hapoel Nazareth Illit)
27	FW	ISR	Shon Weissman (loan return from Ironi Kiryat Shmona)
29	FW	NED	Michiel Kramer (from (Netherlands) Sparta Rotterdam)
77	GK	ISR	Guy Haimov (from (Israel) Hapoel Be'er Sheva)

Out:

No.	Pos.	Nation	Player
—	DF	ISL	Hólmar Örn Eyjólfsson ( (Bulgaria) Levski Sofia (Was on loan previous season)
16	FW	ISR	Omer Damari (loan return to (Germany) RB Leipzig)
11	MF	ISR	Maor Buzaglo (Released)
—	MF	ISR	Mohammad Abu Fani (on loan to Hapoel Hadera)
—	GK	ISR	Roee Fucs (on loan to Hapoel Rishon LeZion)
—	FW	ISR	Gil Haddad (on loan to Sektzia Nes Tziona)
70	MF	BUL	Georgi Kostadinov (to (Russia) Arsenal Tula)
23	DF	ISR	Omri Ben Harush (to (Belgium) K.S.C. Lokeren)
24	DF	ISR	Yahav Gurfinkel (on loan to Hapoel Hadera)
33	FW	ISR	Stefanos Athanasiadis (Released)

=== Maccabi Netanya ===
In:

No.	Pos.	Nation	Player
—	DF	ISR	Dudu Twito (from Hapoel Afula)
—	DF	USA	Jonathan Bornstein (from (Mexico) Querétaro)
—	MF	ISR	Yaniv Brik (on loan from Maccabi Haifa)
—	FW	ISR	Shoval Gozlan (from Ironi Kiryat Shmona)

Out:

No.	Pos.	Nation	Player
—	DF	ISR	Dean Maimoni (to Hapoel Ra'anana)
—	MF	ISR	Dan Glazer (loan return to Maccabi Tel Aviv)
—	FW	ISR	Barak Badash (Retired)

=== Maccabi Petah Tikva ===
In:

No.	Pos.	Nation	Player
—	DF	ISR	Gal Shish (from Hapoel Acre)
—	DF	ISR	Daniel Kohen (from Hapoel Petah Tikva)
—	MF	CIV	Didier Brossou (from Ironi Kiryat Shmona)
—	FW	ISR	Fadi Zidan (from Hapoel Ramat HaSharon)

Out:

No.	Pos.	Nation	Player
—	DF	ISR	Uri Magbo (to Ironi Kiryat Shmona)
—	MF	ISR	Yaniv Brik (to Maccabi Netanya, his player card still belongs to Maccabi Haifa)
—	FW	ISR	Eden Shrem (to Hapoel Katamon)

=== Maccabi Tel Aviv ===
In:

No.	Pos.	Nation	Player
—	DF	POR	Jair (from (Spain) Huesca)
—	DF	ISR	Michael Chikala (from Maccabi Kabilio Jaffa)
—	DF	ESP	Enric Saborit (from (Spain) Athletic Bilbao)
—	DF	ISR	Shahar Piben (loan return from F.C. Ashdod)
—	DF	ISR	Sean Goldberg (loan return from Beitar Jerusalem)
—	MF	ISR	Roslan Barsky (loan return from Hapoel Haifa)
—	MF	ISR	Yonatan Cohen (loan return from Bnei Yehuda)
—	FW	ISR	Itay Shechter (from Beitar Jerusalem)
—	FW	ISR	Matan Hozez (loan return from Bnei Yehuda)
—	FW	ISR	Dor Jan (loan return from F.C. Ashdod)

Out:

No.	Pos.	Nation	Player
—	DF	ISR	Yuval Spungin (to Ironi Kiryat Shmona)
—	DF	MTQ	Jean-Sylvain Babin (loan return to (Spain) Sporting Gijón)
—	DF	ISR	Tal Ben Haim (Released)
—	MF	ESP	José Rodríguez (loan return to (Germany) Mainz 05)
—	MF	ISR	Thomas Prince (on loan to Hapoel Hadera)
—	FW	ISR	Barak Yitzhaki (Retired)

== Liga Leumit ==
=== Beitar Tel Aviv Ramla ===
In:

No.	Pos.	Nation	Player
—	FW	ISR	Omer Buaron (from Hapoel Iksal)

Out:

No.	Pos.	Nation	Player
—	GK	ISR	Sahar Hasson (to Hapoel Ramat HaSharon, his player card still belongs to Maccabi Tel Aviv)
—	DF	ISR	Dean Akafi (to Beitar Jerusalem)
—	DF	ISR	Amash Mantzur (to Hapoel Iksal)

=== Hapoel Acre ===
In:

No.	Pos.	Nation	Player

Out:

No.	Pos.	Nation	Player
—	DF	ISR	Gal Shish (to Maccabi Petah Tikva)
—	DF	ISR	Yinon Eliyahu (to Hapoel Katamon)
—	FW	ISR	Dudu Biton (to F.C. Ashdod)

=== Hapoel Afula ===
In:

No.	Pos.	Nation	Player
—	DF	ISR	Ori Tza'adon (from Ironi Tiberias)
—	MF	ISR	Adrian Rochet (from Hapoel Ashkelon)
—	MF	ISR	Dor Kochav (from Hapoel Ramat HaSharon)
—	MF	ISR	Idan David (from Hapoel Kfar Saba)
—	MF	CRO	Jurica Grgec (from Hapoel Nazareth Illit)
—	MF	ISR	Shay Bouznah (from F.C. Dimona)
—	FW	ISR	Tomer Swisa (from Hapoel Ra'anana)
—	FW	ISR	Aner Shechter (on loan from Hapoel Haifa)

Out:

No.	Pos.	Nation	Player
—	DF	ISR	Dudu Twito (to Maccabi Netanya)
—	DF	ISR	Mohammed Hindy (to Hapoel Iksal)
—	FW	ISR	Yuval Shawat (to Hapoel Nazareth Illit)

=== Hapoel Ashkelon ===
In:

No.	Pos.	Nation	Player
—	DF	LTU	Tadas Kijanskas (from (Czech Republic) FC Zbrojovka Brno)
—	FW	ISR	Gal Tzruya (from Hapoel Petah Tikva)

Out:

No.	Pos.	Nation	Player
—	DF	ISR	Avi Malka (to Hapoel Katamon)
—	DF	SRB	Branislav Jovanović (to Hapoel Ramat Gan)
—	DF	ISR	Tal Makhlouf (to Hapoel Kfar Saba)
—	MF	ISR	Yisrael Zaguri (loan return to Bnei Sakhnin)
—	MF	CRO	Mirko Oremuš (to Hapoel Ra'anana)
—	MF	ISR	Tal Ayela (to Hapoel Ra'anana)
—	MF	ISR	Adrian Rochet (to Hapoel Afula)
—	MF	ISR	Zion Tzemah (to Hapoel Iksal)
—	FW	ISR	Omer Swisa (on loan to Agudat Sport Ashdod)

=== Hapoel Bnei Lod ===
In:

No.	Pos.	Nation	Player
—	DF	ISR	Guy Gomberg (from Hapoel Marmorek)
—	MF	ISR	Diego Nicolaievsky (from (Argentina) G y E Jujuy)
—	MF	ARG	Martin Rose (from (Argentina) Comunicaciones)

Out:

No.	Pos.	Nation	Player
—	DF	ISR	Ben Grabli (to Hapoel Rishon LeZion)
—	DF	ISR	Or Dadya (to Hapoel Hadera, his player card still belongs to Hapoel Be'er Sheva)
—	MF	ISR	Roei Shaya (on loan to Hakoah Amidar Ramat Gan)

=== Hapoel Iksal ===
In:

No.	Pos.	Nation	Player
—	GK	ISR	Assaf Raz (from Bnei Yehuda)
—	DF	ISR	Ben Binyamin (from Maccabi Ironi Kiryat Ata)
—	DF	PLE	Ala'a Abu Saleh (from Bnei Sakhnin)
—	DF	ISR	Amash Mantzur (from Beitar Tel Aviv Ramla)
—	DF	ISR	Sharon Levy (from Hapoel Umm al-Fahm)
—	DF	ISR	Mohammed Hindy (from Hapoel Afula)
—	MF	ISR	Hasan Abu Zaid (from Maccabi Ahi Nazareth)
—	MF	ISR	George Amsis (from Hapoel Rishon LeZion)
—	MF	ISR	Sfouan Zuabi (from Ironi Nesher)
—	MF	ISR	Wael Mresat (from Hapoel Rishon LeZion)
—	MF	ISR	Zion Tzemah (from Hapoel Ashkelon)

Out:

No.	Pos.	Nation	Player
—	DF	ISR	Eliran Hudeda (Retired)
—	FW	ISR	Omer Buaron (to Beitar Tel Aviv Ramla)

=== Hapoel Katamon ===
In:

No.	Pos.	Nation	Player
—	GK	ISR	Raz Rahamim (on loan from Hapoel Be'er Sheva)
—	DF	ISR	Avi Malka (from Hapoel Ashkelon)
—	DF	ISR	Amir Ben-Shimon (from (Slovakia) Inter Bratislava)
—	DF	ISR	Yinon Eliyahu (from Hapoe Acre)
—	MF	ISR	Avihay Wodaje (from Maccabi Yavne)
—	MF	ISR	Tamir Adi (from Hapoel Ramat Gan)
—	FW	ISR	Eden Shrem (from Maccabi Petah Tikva)

Out:

No.	Pos.	Nation	Player
—	DF	ISR	Uri Peso (to Hapoel Rishon LeZion)
—	MF	ISR	Aviram Baruchyan (to Hapoel Rishon LeZion)

=== Hapoel Kfar Saba ===
In:

No.	Pos.	Nation	Player
—	GK	ISR	Itamar Israeli (on loan from Bnei Yehuda)
—	DF	ISR	Haim Izrin (from Hapoel Petah Tikva)
—	DF	ISR	Tal Makhlouf (from Hapoel Ashkelon)
—	DF	ISR	Lenny Aharon (on loan from Maccabi Netanya)
—	DF	ISR	Jenia Berkman (from Hapoel Nazareth Illit)
—	MF	ISR	Kevin Rainstein (from Maccabi Herzliya)
—	MF	ISR	Omri Shekel (from Hapoel Rishon LeZion)
—	MF	ISR	Gal Porat (from Hapoel Herzliya)

Out:

No.	Pos.	Nation	Player
—	MF	ISR	Raz Cohen (to Hapoel Tel Aviv)
—	MF	ISR	Idan David (to Hapoel Afula)

=== Hapoel Marmorek ===
In:

No.	Pos.	Nation	Player
—	GK	ISR	Eric Klenofsky (from (United States) Richmond Kickers)
—	DF	ISR	Ayman Ali (from F.C. Haifa Robi Shapira)
—	DF	ISR	Daniel Borcal (from Hapoel Ramat HaSharon)
—	DF	ISR	Daniel Twizer (from Ironi Nesher)
—	DF	ISR	Erez Isakov (from Hapoel Ramat Gan)
—	MF	ISR	Eden Dahan (on loan from Ironi Kiryat Shmona)
—	MF	ISR	Eran Rosenbaum (from Maccabi Herzliya)
—	FW	ISR	Haitem Halabi (from F.C. Haifa Robi Shapira)

Out:

No.	Pos.	Nation	Player
—	GK	ISR	Dan Amit Hamama (to Shimshon Kafr Qasim)
—	GK	ISR	Tzlil Hatuka (to F.C. Kafr Qasim)
—	GK	ISR	Itamar Israeli (to Hapoel Kfar Saba, his player card still belongs to Bnei Yehuda)
—	DF	ISR	Guy Gomberg (to Hapoel Bnei Lod)
—	DF	ISR	Yam Sasson (to Hapoel Ramat HaSharon)
—	MF	ISR	Gad Ovadia (to F.C. Holon Yermiyahu)
—	FW	ISR	Idan Shriki (to Agudat Sport Ashdod)

=== Hapoel Nazareth Illit ===
In:

No.	Pos.	Nation	Player
—	FW	ISR	Yuval Shawat (from Hapoel Afula)

Out:

No.	Pos.	Nation	Player
—	DF	ISR	Jenia Berkman (to Hapoel Kfar Saba)
—	MF	CRO	Jurica Grgec (to Hapoel Afula)
—	MF	ISR	Iliya Kresyik (on loan to Hapoel Asi Gilboa)

=== Hapoel Petah Tikva ===
In:

No.	Pos.	Nation	Player

Out:

No.	Pos.	Nation	Player
—	DF	ISR	Haim Izrin (to Hapoel Kfar Saba)
—	DF	ISR	Daniel Kohen (to Maccabi Petah Tikva)
—	DF	ISR	Omer Vered (to Hapoel Ra'anana)
—	MF	ISR	Ness Zamir (to Hapoel Haifa)
—	FW	ISR	Gal Tzruya (to Hapoel Ashkelon)

=== Hapoel Ramat Gan ===
In:

No.	Pos.	Nation	Player
—	DF	SRB	Branislav Jovanović (from Hapoel Ashkelon)
—	DF	ISR	Israel Rosh (from Hapoel Tel Aviv)
—	DF	ISR	Raz Nachmias (on loan from Hapoel Tel Aviv)

Out:

No.	Pos.	Nation	Player
—	DF	ISR	Erez Isakov (to Hapoel Marmorek)
—	DF	ISR	Lior Levi (to Hapoel Rishon LeZion)
—	DF	ISR	Ofri Arad (loan return to Maccabi Haifa)
—	MF	ISR	Sharon Ziso (to Hapoel Ramat HaSharon)
—	MF	ISR	Mohammad Abu Fani (to Hapoel Hadera, his player card still belongs to Maccabi Haifa)
—	MF	ISR	Adi Tamir (to Hapoel Katamon)
—	MF	ISR	Nir Sharon (to Sektzia Nes Tziona)
—	FW	NED	Rick ten Voorde (to (Iceland) Víkingur)

=== Hapoel Ramat HaSharon ===
In:

No.	Pos.	Nation	Player
—	GK	ISR	Sahar Hasson (on loan from Maccabi Tel Aviv)
—	DF	ISR	Yam Sasson (from Hapoel Marmorek)
—	MF	ISR	Sharon Ziso (from Hapoel Ramat Gan)
—	MF	ISR	Moti Malka (from Hapoel Kafr Kanna)
—	FW	ISR	Stav Ben Aharon (from Hapoel Herzliya)

Out:

No.	Pos.	Nation	Player
—	DF	ISR	Daniel Borcal (to Hapoel Marmorek)
—	DF	ISR	Maxim Grechkin (to Hapoel Hadera, his player card still belongs to Maccabi Tel Aviv)
—	MF	ISR	Dor Kochav (to Hapoel Afula)
—	FW	ISR	Fadi Zidan (to Maccabi Petah Tikva)

=== Hapoel Rishon LeZion ===
In:

No.	Pos.	Nation	Player
—	GK	ISR	Roee Fucs (on loan from Maccabi Haifa)
—	DF	ISR	Uri Peso (from Hapoel Katamon)
—	DF	ISR	Lior Levi (from Hapoel Ramat Gan)
—	MF	ISR	Aviram Baruchyan (from Hapoel Katamon)
—	FW	ISR	Itamar Shviro (on loan from Hapoel Be'er Sheva)

Out:

No.	Pos.	Nation	Player
—	DF	ISR	Wesam Rabah (to Hapoel Hadera)
—	DF	ISR	Matan Peleg (to Beitar Jerusalem)
—	MF	ISR	George Amsis (to Hapoel Iksal)
—	MF	ISR	Omri Shekel (to Hapoel Kfar Saba)
—	MF	ISR	Wael Mresat (to Hapoel Iksal)

=== Maccabi Ahi Nazareth ===
In:

No.	Pos.	Nation	Player

Out:

No.	Pos.	Nation	Player
—	GK	ISR	Gad Amos (to Ironi Kiryat Shmona)
—	DF	ISR	Ahmed Shaban (to Sektzia Nes Tziona)
—	MF	ISR	Hasan Abu Zaid (to Hapoel Iksal)

=== Sektzia Nes Tziona ===
In:

No.	Pos.	Nation	Player
—	GK	ISR	Stav Shushan (on loan from Beitar Jerusalem)
—	DF	ISR	Ahmed Shaban (from Maccabi Ahi Nazareth)
—	FW	ISR	Matan Beit Ya'akov (from Maccabi Kabilio Jaffa)
—	FW	ISR	Gil Haddad (on loan from Maccabi Haifa)
—	FW	ISR	Raz Stain (from Maccabi Herzliya)

Out:

No.	Pos.	Nation	Player
—	GK	ISR	Itay Duani (to Beitar Kfar Saba)
—	GK	ISR	Nil Strauber (to (United States) Tyler Junior College Athletics)
—	DF	ISR	Assaf Hakak (to Maccabi Sha'arayim)
—	DF	ISR	Ravid Asher (Released)
—	DF	ISR	Guy Eini (to Agudat Sport Ashdod)
—	MF	ISR	Guy Ovadia (to Maccabi Ironi Ashdod)
