= 2009–10 Hapoel Tel Aviv F.C. season =

Hapoel Tel Aviv
2009–10 season
- Chairman: Moni Harel, Eli Tabib
- Manager: Eli Guttman
- Stadium: Bloomfield Stadium, Tel Aviv
- Liga Al: 1st
- State Cup: Winners
- Toto Cup: Group stage
- UEFA Europa League: Round of 32
- Top goalscorer: League: (Israel) Itay Shechter (22); All: (Israel) Itay Shechter (31)
- Highest home attendance: 16,000 vs Maccabi Tel Aviv (8 May 2010)
- Lowest home attendance: 100 vs Bnei Yehuda (17 November 2009)
- Average home league attendance: 10,286
Home colours	Away colours	Third colours

The 2009–10 season was Hapoel Tel Aviv's 69th season in Israeli Premier League, and their 20th consecutive season in the top division of Israeli football.

The season was a great success for the club winning both the league and Israel State Cup.

== UEFA Europa League ==
=== Qualification ===
Date	Opponents	H / A	Result F – A	Scorers	Attendance
30 July 2009	(Sweden) IFK Göteborg	A	3-1	Shechter 73'; Yeboah 78'; Natcho 94';	7,638
6 August 2009	(Sweden) IFK Göteborg	H	1-1	Zandberg 14'	6,000
20 August 2009	(Czech Republic) FK Teplice	A	2-1	Enyeama 72', Vermuth 94';	5,000
27 August 2009	(Czech Republic) FK Teplice	H	1-1	Ben Dayan 91';	9,000

=== Group C ===
Date	Opponents	H / A	Result F – A	Scorers	Attendance
17 September 2009	(Scotland) Celtic F.C.	H	2–1	Vučićević 75'; Lala 88';	11,000
1 October 2009	(Germany) Hamburger SV	A	2-4	Shechter 37'; Yeboah 62';	30,000
22 October 2009	(Austria) SK Rapid Wien	H	5-1	Menteshashvili 54'; Shechter 59'; Vermuth 69'; Lala 90';	12,500
5 November 2009	(Austria) SK Rapid Wien	A	3-0	Yadin 13'; Vermuth 65'; Natcho 70';	50,000
2 December 2009	(Scotland) Celtic F.C.	A	0-2		27,000
17 December 2009	(Germany) Hamburger SV	H	1-0	Yeboah 23';	15,164

Pos	Team	Pld	W	D	L	GF	GA	GD	Pts	Qualification
1	(Israel) Hapoel Tel Aviv	6	4	0	2	13	8	+5	12	Advance to knockout phase
2	(Germany) Hamburger SV	6	3	1	2	7	6	+1	10	Advance to knockout phase
3	(Scotland) Celtic	6	1	3	2	7	7	0	6	
4	(Austria) Rapid Wien	6	1	2	3	8	14	−6	5	

Source: Soccerway

=== Knockout phase ===
Date	Opponents	H / A	Result F – A	Scorers	Attendance
18 February 2010	(Russia) FC Rubin Kazan	A	0–3		15,000
25 February 2010	(Russia) FC Rubin Kazan	H	0-0		12,864

== Ligat Ha'Al (Premier League) ==
=== Regular season ===
Date	Opponents	H / A	Result F – A	Scorers	Attendance
22 August 2009	Beitar Jerusalem	A	0 – 0		17,000
30 August 2009	Maccabi Petah Tikva	H	1 – 1	Ben Dayan 12';	9,500
13 September 2009	Hapoel Be'er Sheva	A	3 – 1	Vučićević 18'; Zandberg 58'; Yadin 91';	7,500
21 September 2009	Maccabi Haifa	H	1 – 2	Shechter 36';	14,000
4 October 2009	Maccabi Netanya	A	3 – 0	Shechter 14',61'; Yeboah 39';	4,000
17 October 2009	F.C. Ashdod	H	2 – 2	Vučićević 44'; Enyeama 76';	8,500
24 October 2009	Maccabi Ahi Nazareth	A	4 – 0	Shechter 22',59'; Vučićević 54'; Ben Dayan 73';	3,500
1 November 2009	Maccabi Tel Aviv	H	1 – 0	da Silva 12';	15,500
8 November 2009	Bnei Sakhnin	A	2 – 1	da Silva 11'; Shechter 90';	3,000
21 November 2009	Hapoel Petah Tikva	H	7 – 1	Shechter 3',33',41'; Ben Dayan 66'; Lala 69'; Zahavi 82'; Vermuth 86';	9,500
28 November 2009	Bnei Yehuda Tel Aviv	A	1 – 0	Shechter 12';	7,000
7 December 2009	Hapoel Haifa	H	2 – 0	Shechter 19'; Yadin 74';	7,500
29 December 2009	Hapoel Akko	A	1 – 1	Lala 2';	2,000
21 December 2009	Hapoel Ra'anana	H	5 – 0	Yeboah 20'; Ben Dayan 21',28'; Zahavi 40'; Shechter 62';	8,164
26 December 2009	Hapoel Ramat Gan	A	3 – 0	Ben Dayan 23'; Enyeama 45'; da Silva 53';	2,500
4 January 2010	Beitar Jerusalem	H	4 – 3	Lala 12'; Ben Dayan 35'; Zahavi 55'; Shechter 60';	14,264
9 January 2010	Maccabi Petah Tikva	A	0 – 0		3,000
18 January 2010	Hapoel Be'er Sheva	H	4 – 1	Ben Dayan 31'; Vermuth 42',61'; Zahavi 75';	9,000
25 January 2010	Maccabi Haifa	A	0 – 0		15,000
30 January 2010	Maccabi Netanya	H	3 – 3	Vermuth 83',95'; Badir 89';	9,500
7 February 2010	F.C. Ashdod	A	4 – 0	Zahavi 11'; Shechter 15',55'; Ben Dayan 64';	4,000
13 February 2010	Maccabi Ahi Nazareth	H	4 – 0	Shechter 7'; Enyeama 39'; Merey 42'; Lala 44';	8,000
22 February 2010	Maccabi Tel Aviv	A	4 – 2	Lala 17'; Shechter 21',65'; da Silva 30';	16,000
28 February 2010	Bnei Sakhnin	H	1 – 0	Zahavi 34';	6,500
6 March 2010	Hapoel Petah Tikva	A	1 – 1	da Silva 77';	3,500
13 March 2010	Bnei Yehuda Tel Aviv	H	4 – 0	Yadin 11'; Shechter 21'; Vermuth 90';	11,000
22 March 2010	Hapoel Haifa	A	2 – 1	Vermuth 25'; Zahavi 35';	4,500
27 March 2010	Hapoel Akko	H	5 – 3	Badir 5'; Zahavi 13'; Merey 61'; Shechter 85'; Ben Dayan 88';	12,164
3 April 2010	Hapoel Ra'anana	A	4 – 1	Vermuth 2'; Enyeama 56'; Vručina 59'; Shechter 87';	3,000

Pos	Team	Pld	W	D	L	GF	GA	GD	Pts	Qualification
1	Maccabi Haifa	30	25	2	3	64	12	+52	77	Qualification for the championship round
2	Hapoel Tel Aviv	30	21	8	1	79	25	+54	71	Qualification for the championship round
3	Maccabi Tel Aviv	30	15	7	8	47	33	+14	52	Qualification for the championship round
4	Beitar Jerusalem	30	13	7	10	46	34	+12	46	Qualification for the championship round
5	Bnei Yehuda	30	12	9	9	37	30	+7	45 (Note: F.C. Ashdod received a technical loss of 3–0 to Bnei Yehuda for fielding an ineligible player. The original game finished in a 1–1 draw.)	Qualification for the championship round

Source: Israel Football Association
Rules for classification: 1st points; 2nd goal difference; 3rd matches won; 4th goals scored; 5th head-to-head; 6th decision match.

=== Top playoff ===
Date	Opponents	H / A	Result F – A	Scorers	Attendance
10 April 2010	Ramat Gan	H	3 – 1	Enyeama 9'; Zahavi 16'; Shechter 33';	13,000
17 April 2010	Bnei Yehuda Tel Aviv	H	1 – 0	de Ridder 46';	13,000
26 April 2010	Maccabi Haifa	A	1 – 0	Lala 59';	14,500
1 May 2010	F.C. Ashdod	H	4 – 0	Ben Dayan 8'; Badir 31'; de Ridder 66'; da Silva 88';	14,000
8 May 2010	Maccabi Tel Aviv	H	0 – 0		16,000
15 May 2010	Beitar Jerusalem	A	2 – 1	Vermuth 3'; Zahavi 92';	8,000

Pos	Team	Pld	W	D	L	GF	GA	GD	Pts	Qualification
1	Hapoel Tel Aviv (C)	35	25	9	1	87	26	+61	49	Qualification for the Champions League second qualifying round
2	Maccabi Haifa	35	28	3	4	72	16	+56	49	Qualification for the Europa League third qualifying round
3	Maccabi Tel Aviv	35	17	9	9	52	35	+17	34	Qualification for the Europa League second qualifying round
4	Bnei Yehuda	35	14	11	10	43	34	+9	31	Qualification for the Europa League first qualifying round (Note: As Hapoel Tel Aviv won both League and 2009–10 Israel State Cup, the State Cup finalists Bnei Yehuda received the final Europa League spot.)
5	Beitar Jerusalem	35	14	7	14	50	44	+6	26	
6	F.C. Ironi Ashdod	35	11	10	14	36	45	−9	22	

Source: Israel Football Association
Rules for classification: 1st points; 2nd goal difference; 3rd matches won; 4th goals scored; 5th head-to-head; 6th decision match.
(C) Champions

== State Cup ==
Date	Round	Opponents	H / A	Result F – A	Scorers	Attendance
14 February 2009	Round 9	Hapoel Haifa	A	3 – 0	Lala 3'; Enyeama 45'; Shechter 75';	3,500
12 March 2009	Round of 16	Maccabi Jaffa	A	5 – 0	Shechter 3',53'; Badir 10'; Vručina 30'; Zahavi 40';	5,000
22 April 2009	Quarter-final	Beitar Jerusalem	H	2 – 0	Ben Dayan 56'; Vermuth 73';	14,500
13 May 2009	Semi-final	Ironi Ramat HaSharon	N	3 – 1	Shechter 26'; Vermuth 39'; Enyeama 58';	15,000
26 May 2009	Final	Bnei Yehuda	N	3 – 1	Vermuth 25',75'; Enyeama 45';	34,432

== Toto Cup ==
Date	Opponents	H / A	Result F – A	Scorers	Attendance
1 August 2009	Bnei Yehuda	A	1 – 1	Lala 59'	1,500
10 August 2009	Maccabi Netanya	A	2 – 3	Zandberg 8'; Shechter 55;	350
15 August 2009	Beitar Jerusalem	H	2 – 1	Lala 59'; Shechter 72;	7,000
23 September 2009	Beitar Jerusalem	A	0 – 1		1,500
17 November 2009	Bnei Yehuda	H	0 – 1		100
11 December 2009	Maccabi Netanya	H	2 – 2	Zahavi 49'; Hota 54';	800

Pos	Club	Pld	W	D	L	F	A	GD	Pts
1	Beitar Jerusalem	6	4	1	1	10	3	+3	13
2	Bnei Yehuda	6	3	2	1	4	3	+1	11
3	Hapoel Tel Aviv	6	1	2	3	7	9	-2	5
4	Maccabi Netanya	6	1	1	4	6	12	-6	4

Pld = Matches played; W = Matches won; D = Matches drawn; L = Matches lost; F = Goals for; A = Goals against; GD = Goal difference; Pts = Points
