= Elior Seiderre =

Israeli footballer

Elior Seiderer
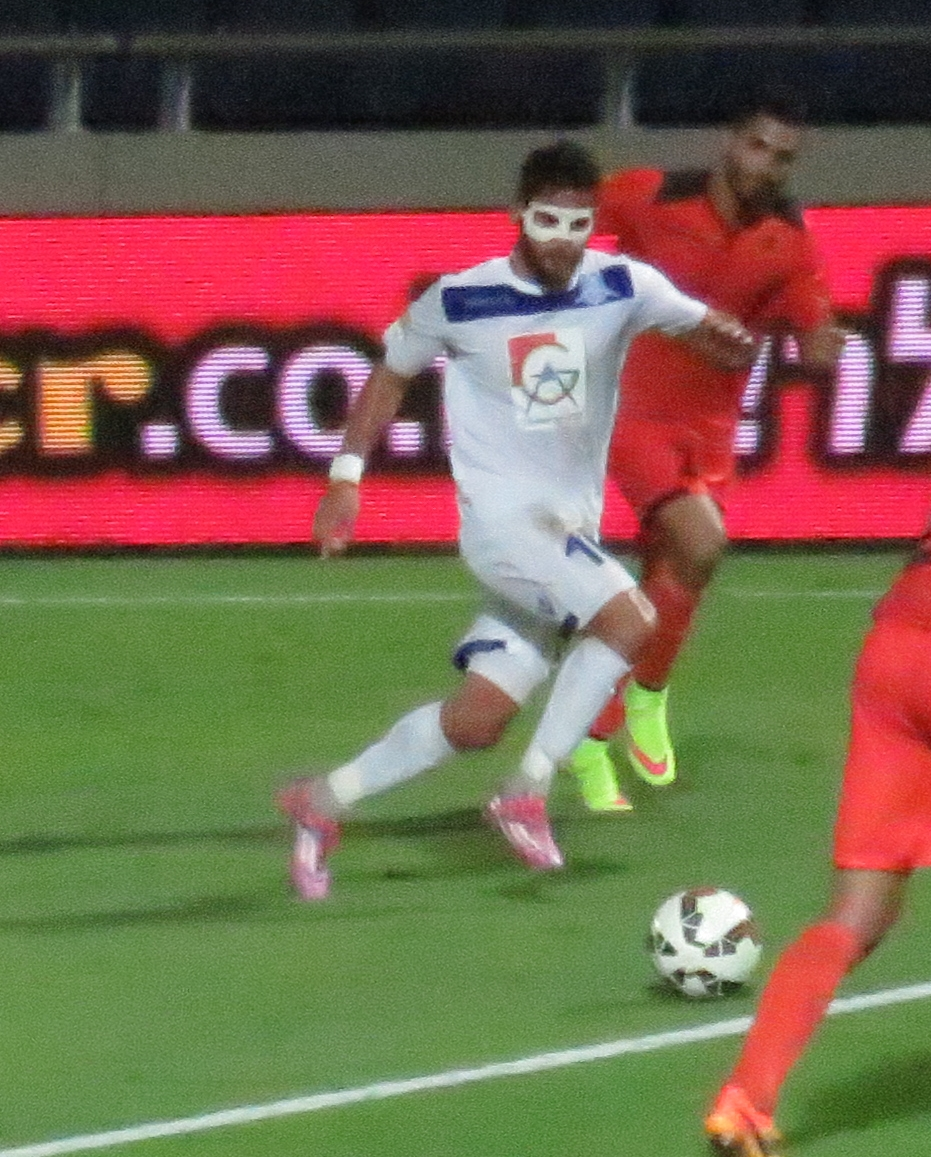
- Seiderer playing for Hapoel Acre in 2015

Personal information
- Date of birth: 17 November 1991 (age 34)
- Place of birth: Nahariya, Israel
- Position: Forward

Team information
- Current team: Beitar Nahariya

Youth career
- Hapoel Acre

Senior career*
Years	Team	Apps	(Gls)
2009–2017	Hapoel Acre	94	(7)
2011–2012	→ Sektzia Ma'alot-Tarshiha	29	(9)
2012–2013	→ Hapoel Afula	26	(10)
2017	→ Hapoel Afula	13	(1)
2017–2018	Hapoel Afula	28	(6)
2018–2019	Hapoel Acre	36	(14)
2019–2020	Hapoel Afula	30	(5)
2020–2021	Hapoel Umm al-Fahm	14	(1)
2021	Hapoel Kfar Shalem	17	(3)
2021–2022	Shimshon Kafr Qasim	35	(22)
2022–2023	Hapoel Ra'anana	31	(16)
2023–2024	F.C. Kiryat Yam	31	(15)
2024–2025	Maccabi Ironi Kiryat Ata	14	(2)
2025–	Beitar Nahariya	0	(0)
- * Club domestic league appearances and goals as of 1 June 2025

Elior Seiderer (Hebrew: אליאור סיידר) is an Israeli football who plays for Beitar Nahariya as a forward.

== Career ==
He started his career at the Hapoel Acre youth system, He scored 54 goals at 3 seasons at the youth system. On 11 May 2009 he made his debut at the senior team against Hapoel Bnei Lod.

In summer 2011 he on loaned to Sektzia Ma'alot-Tarshiha, and at summer 2012 on loaned to Hapoel Afula.

In summer 2013 he return to Acre, On 19 October 2013 he scored his debut goal at Acre at the win 3–1 against Hapoel Ra'anana.
