= Yossi Dora =

Israeli footballer

Yossi Dora יוסי דורה
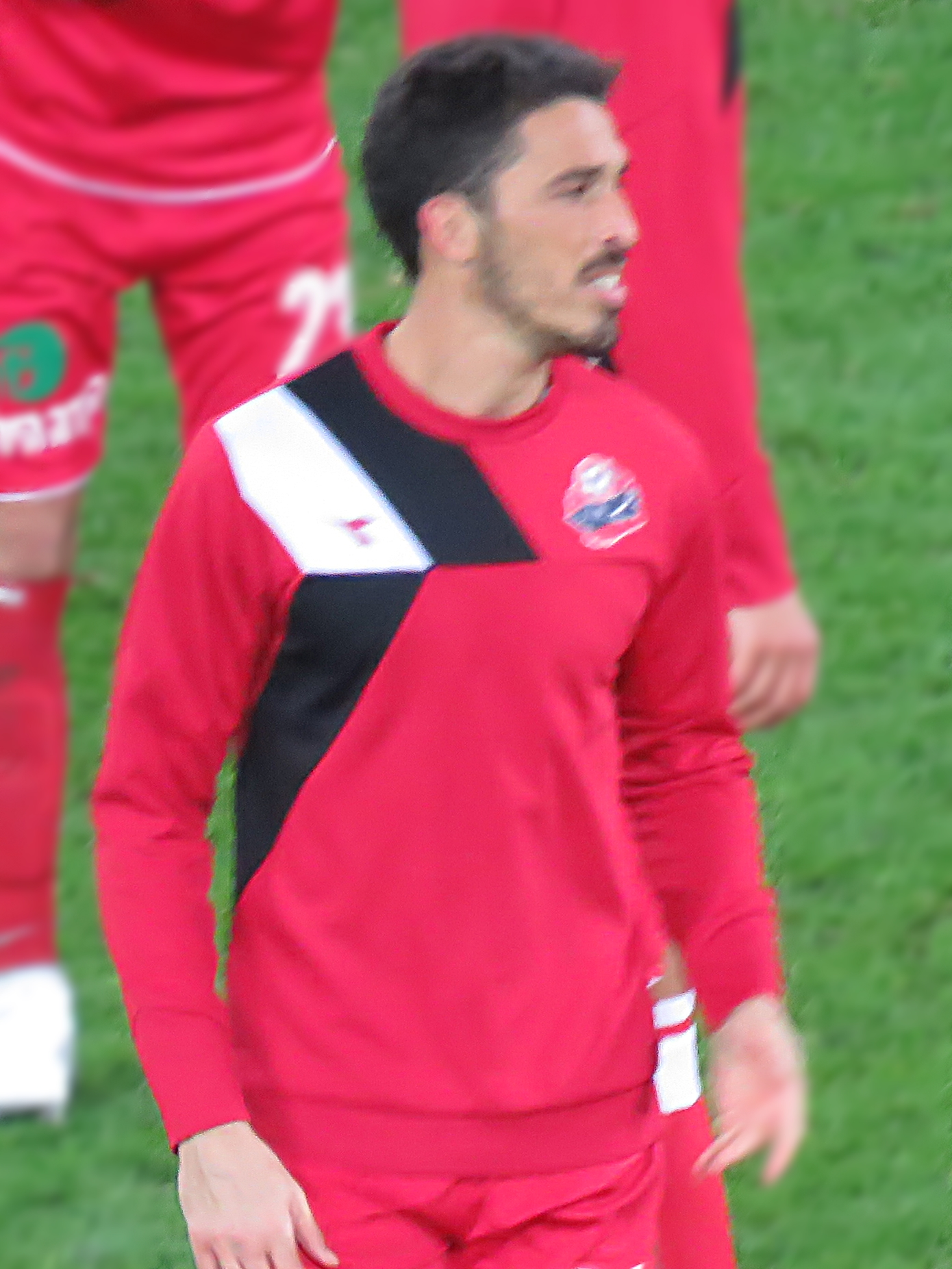

Personal information
- Full name: Yossi Dora
- Date of birth: August 25, 1981 (age 45)
- Place of birth: Haifa, Israel
- Height: 1.78 m (5 ft 10 in)
- Position: Midfielder

Youth career
- Hapoel Haifa

Senior career*
Years	Team	Apps	(Gls)
1999–2000	Hapoel Haifa	2	(0)
2000–2001	Hapoel Tzafririm Holon	14	(0)
2001–2002	Bnei Sakhnin		
2002–2003	Bnei Yehuda	6	(0)
2003–2005	Hapoel Haifa		
2005–2006	Hakoah Amidar Ramat Gan		
2006	Hapoel Petah Tikva	8	(0)
2007–2008	Ironi Kiryat Shmona	20	(0)
2008–2014	Hapoel Haifa	182	(0)
2014–2015	Hapoel Acre	31	(0)
2015–2017	Hapoel Haifa	29	(0)
- * Club domestic league appearances and goals

Yossi Dora (Hebrew: יוסי דורה; born August 25, 1981) is a retired Israeli footballer.
