= Amir Abu Nil =

Israeli footballer

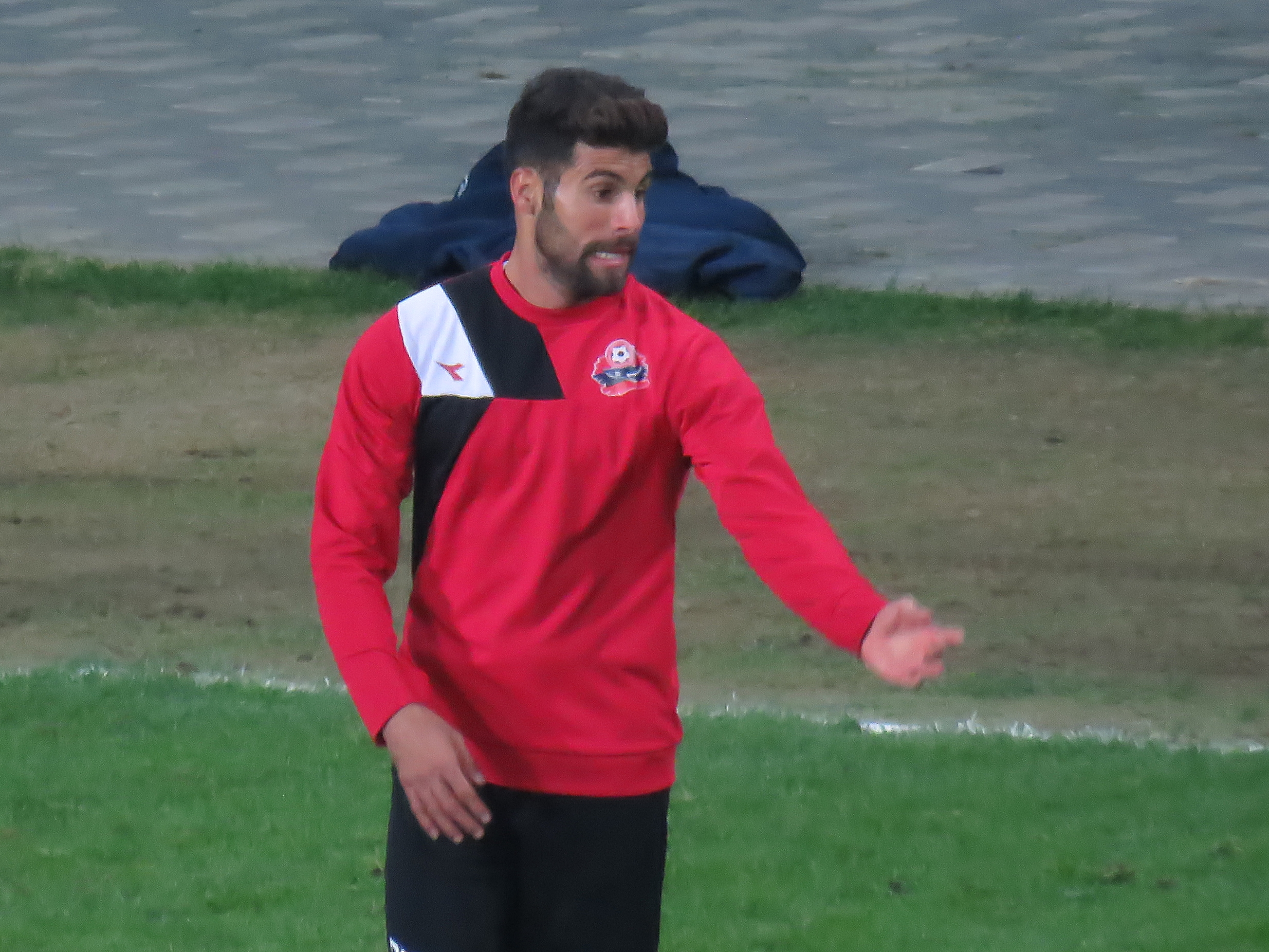

Personal information
- Full name: Amir Abu Nil
- Date of birth: February 27, 1989 (age 37)
- Place of birth: I'billin, Israel
- Position: Attacking midfielder

Youth career
- Hapoel Haifa

Senior career*
Years	Team	Apps	(Gls)
2009–2017	Hapoel Haifa	67	(8)
2013–2014	→ Maccabi Ahi Nazareth (loan)	33	(5)
2014–2015	→ Hapoel Acre (loan)	27	(4)
2016–2017	→ Hapoel Rishon LeZion (loan)	14	(0)
2017	→ Ironi Nesher (loan)	18	(0)
2017–2018	Hapoel Bnei Lod	18	(0)
2018–2019	Hapoel Kaukab	18	(3)
2019	F.C. Daburiyya	7	(2)
2019–2021	Maccabi Bnei Reineh	31	(2)
2021–2024	Ihud Bnei Shefa-'Amr	61	(9)
2024	Tzeirei Umm al-Fahm	17	(2)
2024	Hapoel Arraba	4	(2)
- * Club domestic league appearances and goals as of 10 July 2025

Amir Abu Nil (Arabic: أمير أبو نيل, Hebrew: אמיר אבו ניל; born 27 February 1989) is an Israeli footballer currently playing for Maccabi Umm al-Fahm.
