= Omer Danino =

Israeli footballer

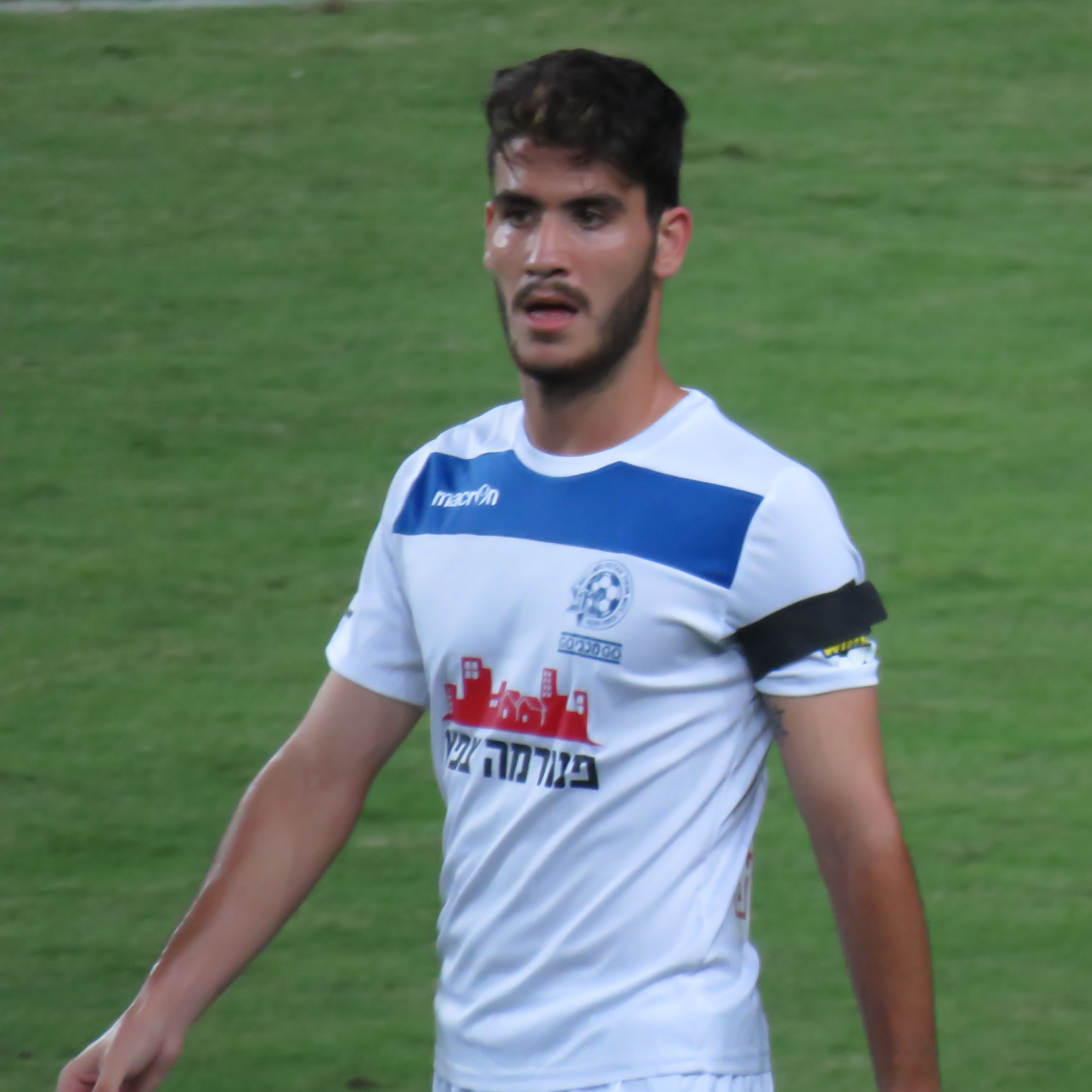

Personal information
- Full name: Omer Danino
- Date of birth: 17 February 1995 (age 31)
- Place of birth: Rosh HaAyin, Israel
- Height: 1.80 m (5 ft 11 in)
- Position: Center back

Youth career
- 2007–2014: Maccabi Petah Tikva

Senior career*
| Years | Team | Apps | (Gls) |
| 2013–2020 | Maccabi Petah Tikva | 126 | (2) |
| 2020–2021 | Hapoel Kfar Saba | 23 | (0) |
| 2021–2023 | Hapoel Hadera | 8 | (0) |

International career
| 2011 | Israel U17 | 2 | (0) |
| 2013–2014 | Israel U19 | 9 | (1) |
| 2015–2017 | Israel U21 | 4 | (0) |
- * Club domestic league appearances and goals as of 1 June 2022

Omer Danino (Hebrew: עומר דנינו; born February 17, 1995) is a former Israeli football player.

== Club career ==
Danino started his career at Maccabi Petah Tikva's youth team. On 17 May 2013, he debuted in the senior team in the 1–1 draw against Maccabi Herzliya. Before the 2014–15 season, Danino ended the youth age and became a senior player. At the beginning of the season, Petah Tikva's defence had many goals against them. Hence, the coach, Ran Ben Shimon, gave Danino the opportunity, and the defence's ability improved. Danino has become a player in the lineup. On 25 May 2015, he scored his debut career goal in the 1–0 victory against Maccabi Haifa.

On 4 August 2015, he became the youngest captain in the club's history. After he received the captain, the club's captain, Joachim Mununga, substituted.

== International career ==
Danino played for the Israel U-19 football team, part of the team's first increase to the 2014 UEFA European Under-19 Championship.
