= Snir Shoker =

Israeli footballer

Snir Shoker שניר שוקר
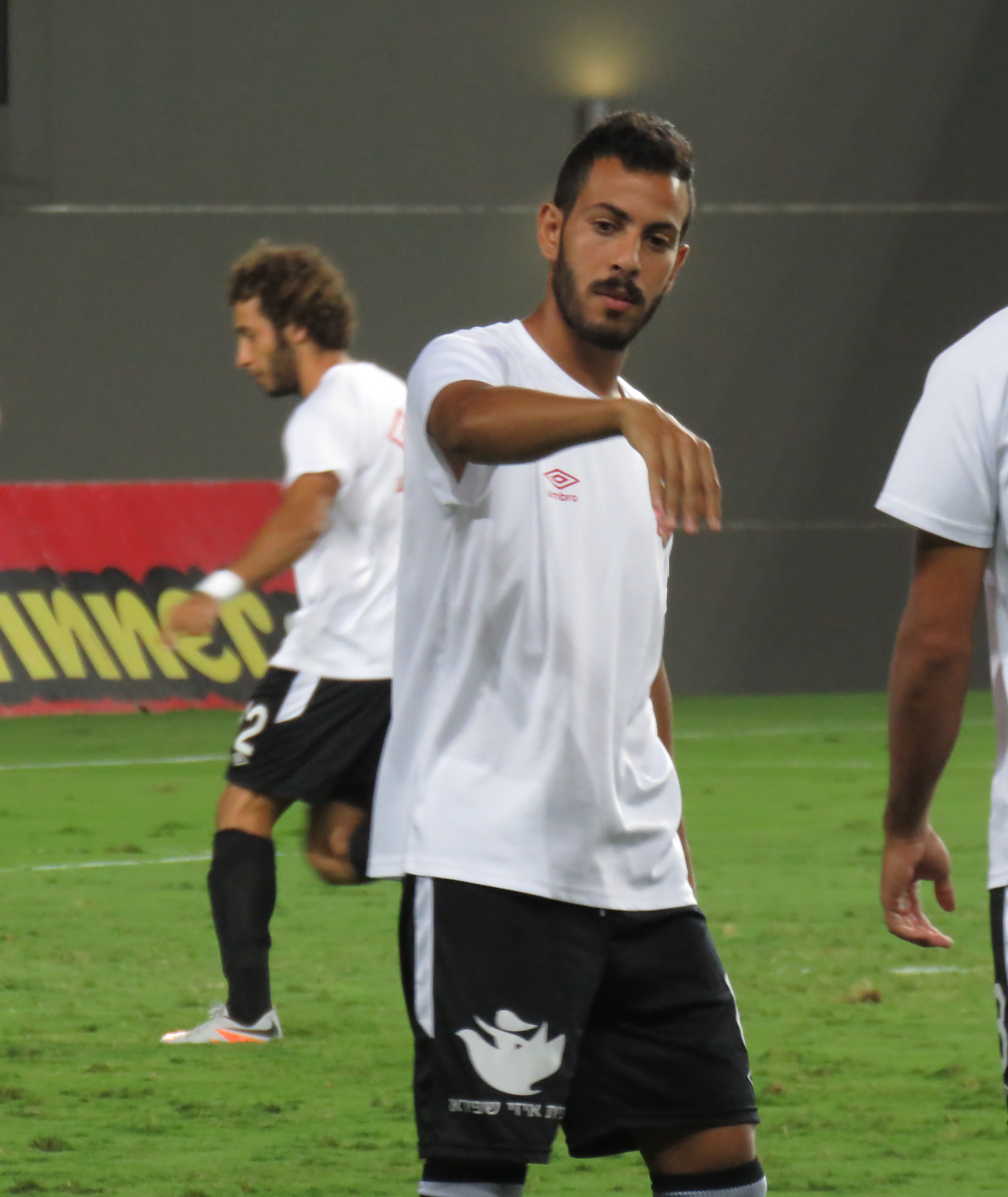

Personal information
- Date of birth: 8 May 1989 (age 37)
- Place of birth: Ra'anana, Israel
- Position: Midfielder

Team information
- Current team: Hapoel Ra'anana
- Number: 8

Youth career
- Hapoel Ra'anana

Senior career*
Years	Team	Apps	(Gls)
2009–	Hapoel Ra'anana	368	(20)
- * Club domestic league appearances and goals as of 24 June 2026

Snir Shoker (Hebrew: שניר שוקר; born 8 May 1989) is an Israeli footballer who plays as a midfielder for Hapoel Ra'anana.

== Career ==
Shoker started his career with Israeli top flight side Hapoel Ra'anana, where he has made 313 appearances and scored 15 goals. He had suffered relegation to the Israeli second tier and helped them earn promotion to the Israeli top flight. On 22 August 2009, he debuted for Hapoel Ra'anana at the Israeli Premier League during a 1–2 loss to Hapoel Be'er Sheva. On 12 February 2011, Shoker scored his first goal for Hapoel Ra'anana during a 1–1 draw with Hapoel Ramat Gan Givatayim.
