= Matan Peleg =

Guatemalan footballer

Matan Peleg מתן פלג
Personal information
- Full name: Marlon Samuel Peleg Zigger
- Date of birth: 11 November 1993 (age 33)
- Place of birth: Guatemala City, Guatemala
- Height: 1.83 m (6 ft 0 in)
- Position: Right-back

Team information
- Current team: Hapoel Rishon LeZion
- Number: 2

Youth career
- 2008–2009: Hapoel Beit She'an
- 2009–2011: Ironi Nesher
- 2011–2012: Hapoel Kfar Saba

Senior career*
Years	Team	Apps	(Gls)
2012–2015	Ironi Tiberias	68	(2)
2015–2017	Hapoel Bnei Lod	57	(1)
2017–2018	Hapoel Rishon LeZion	35	(0)
2018–2019	Beitar Jerusalem	3	(0)
2019	Hapoel Marmorek	14	(0)
2019–2020	Hapoel Rishon LeZion	33	(0)
2020–2021	Hapoel Nof HaGalil	33	(2)
2021–2022	Hapoel Kfar Saba	28	(0)
2022–2025	Hapoel Petah Tikva	59	(2)
2025–	Hapoel Rishon LeZion	23	(0)

International career
2021–2022	Guatemala	6	(0)
- * Club domestic league appearances and goals as of 24 June 2026

Marlon Samuel Peleg Zigger (Hebrew: מתן פלג; born 11 November 1993), known as Matan Peleg, is a Guatemalan professional footballer who plays as a right-back for Liga Leumit club Hapoel Rishon LeZion.

== Early life ==
Peleg was born in Guatemala but moved to Israel at an early age, when he was adopted by Israeli parents at two years old, and raised in kibbutz Shaʽar HaGolan.

== International career ==
On 4 June 2021, Peleg made his debut for the Guatemala national football team in their match against Saint Vincent and the Grenadines during the 2022 FIFA World Cup qualification. He played 90 minutes and had two assists in Guatemala's 10–0 victory.

== Honours ==
Hapoel Nof HaGalil

- Toto Cup Leumit (1): 2019–20
