= Ala'a Abu Saleh =

Palestinian footballer

Ala'a Abu Saleh علاء أبو صالح
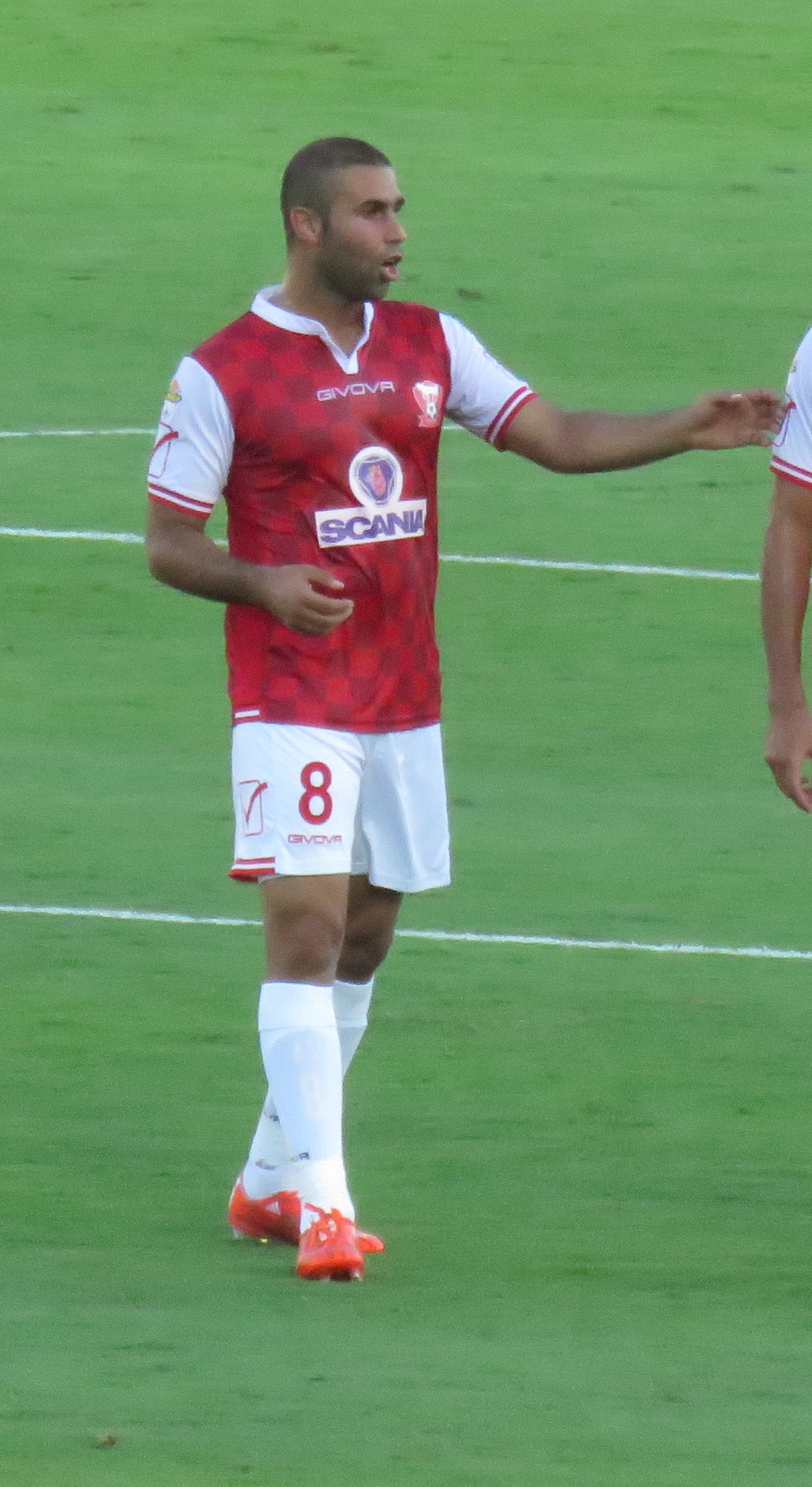
- Abu Saleh playing for Bnei Sakhnin in 2015

Personal information
- Full name: Ala'a Abu Saleh
- Date of birth: 25 June 1987 (age 39)
- Place of birth: Sakhnin, Israel
- Position: Center back

Senior career*
Years	Team	Apps	(Gls)
2005–2016	Bnei Sakhnin	198	(7)
2016–2017	Shabab Al-Khalil	?	(?)
2017–2018	Bnei Sakhnin	14	(0)
2018–2019	Hapoel Iksal	26	(1)

International career
2016	Palestine	3	(0)
- * Club domestic league appearances and goals

Ala'a Abu Saleh (Arabic: علاء أبو صالح, Hebrew: עלאא אבו סאלח; born June 25, 1987) is a footballer who plays as a right full back. Born in Israel, he played for the Palestine national team.
