= Hisham Kiwan =

Israeli footballer

Hisham Kiwan هشام كيوان
Personal information
- Full name: Hisham Kiwan
- Date of birth: May 17, 1987 (age 39)
- Place of birth: Majd al-Kurum, Israel
- Positions: Midfielder; striker

Team information
- Current team: Ihud Bnei Majd al-Krum

Youth career
- Hapoel Haifa

Senior career*
| Years | Team | Apps | (Gls) |
| 2006–2018 | Hapoel Haifa | 253 | (12) |
| 2018 | → Maccabi Ahi Nazareth (loan) | 14 | (0) |
| 2018–2019 | Hapoel Bnei Lod | 26 | (1) |
| 2019–2021 | Ihud Bnei Majd al-Krum | 32 | (6) |
| 2021 | Ironi Bnei Sha'ab | 2 | (0) |
| 2021–2023 | Hapoel Karmiel | 36 | (4) |
| 2023– | Ihud Bnei Majd al-Krum | 17 | (6) |

International career
| 2007 | Israel U21 | 1 | (0) |
- * Club domestic league appearances and goals as of 28 October 2023

Hisham Kiwan (Arabic: هشام كيوان, Hebrew: הישאם כיוואן; born 17 May 1987) is an Israeli footballer currently playing for Hapoel Karmiel.
