= Tal Makhlouf =

Israeli footballer

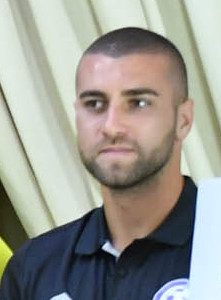
- Tal Makluf, 2018

Personal information
- Full name: Tal Makhlouf
- Date of birth: 31 August 1991 (age 35)
- Place of birth: Ashkelon, Israel
- Height: 1.85 m (6 ft 1 in)
- Position: Center back

Team information
- Current team: Hapoel Ashkelon

Youth career
- Hapoel Ashkelon

Senior career*
Years	Team	Apps	(Gls)
2010–2013	Hapoel Ashkelon	50	(0)
2013–2014	Ironi Tiberias	32	(0)
2014–2019	Hapoel Ashkelon	74	(0)
2019–2022	Hapoel Kfar Saba	94	(4)
2022	Hapoel Ashdod	0	(0)
2023–2024	Hapoel Rishon LeZion	31	(0)
2025	Hapoel Ashkelon	9	(3)
- * Club domestic league appearances and goals

Tal Makhlouf (Hebrew: טל מכלוף; born 31 August 1991) is an Israeli former footballer who played as a center defender.
