= Guy Gomberg =

Israeli footballer

Personal information
- Full name: Guy Gomberg
- Date of birth: September 24, 1990 (age 36)
- Place of birth: Netanya, Israel
- Position: Left back

Senior career*
Years	Team	Apps	(Gls)
2010–2013	Maccabi Netanya	5	(0)
2011–2012	→ Hapoel Herzliya (loan)	13	(0)
2012–2013	→ Maccabi Kiryat Malakhi (loan)	7	(0)
2013	→ Sektzia Ness Ziona (loan)	9	(0)
2013–2014	Sektzia Ness Ziona	26	(1)
2014–2015	Hapoel Rishon LeZion	32	(1)
2015–2016	Hapoel Tel Aviv	0	(0)
2016	Beitar Tel Aviv Ramla	14	(0)
2016–2017	Maccabi Herzliya	31	(0)
2017–2018	Hapoel Marmorek	22	(0)
2018	Hapoel Bnei Lod	11	(0)
2018	Hapoel Ashkelon	11	(0)
2018–2019	F.C. Kafr Qasim	15	(1)
2019–2020	Maccabi Sha'arayim	21	(0)
2020–2021	Maccabi Ironi Ashdod	19	(0)
2021–2022	Hapoel Gedera	19	(0)
- * Club domestic league appearances and goals

Guy Gomberg (Hebrew: גיא גומברג; born 24 September 1990) is an Israeli former footballer who played as a Left Back.
