= Tal Ayela =

Israeli footballer (born 1989)

Personal information
- Full name: Tal Ayela
- Date of birth: May 25, 1989 (age 37)
- Place of birth: Ethiopia
- Height: 1.78 m (5 ft 10 in)
- Position: Midfielder

Team information
- Current team: Ironi Beit Shemesh F.C.

Youth career
- Hapoel Tel Aviv

Senior career*
Years	Team	Apps	(Gls)
2008–2009	Hapoel Tel Aviv	0	(0)
2009–2010	Maccabi Ironi Bat Yam	9	(0)
2010	Hapoel Nahlat Yehuda	8	(1)
2010–2012	Maccabi HaShikma Ramat Hen	38	(10)
2012–2013	Beitar Kfar Saba	34	(5)
2014	Hapoel Marmorek	15	(2)
2014–2015	Maccabi Kiryat Gat	37	(7)
2015–2016	Maccabi Netanya	7	(0)
2016–2017	Hapoel Kfar Saba	38	(3)
2017–2018	Hapoel Ashkelon	4	(3)
2018–2019	Hapoel Ra'anana	12	(0)
2019	Hapoel Ramat Gan	12	(1)
2019–2020	Maccabi Yavne	14	(0)
2020	Nordia Jerusalem	5	(1)
2020–2021	Hapoel Ashdod	22	(2)
2021–2022	F.C. Dimona	13	(2)
2022	Tzeirei Tayibe	20	(8)
2022–2023	Maccabi Jaffa	10	(0)
2023–2024	Hapoel Kfar Shalem	43	(11)
2024	F.C. Tira	5	(0)
2024–	Ironi Beit Shemesh	18	(3)
- * Club domestic league appearances and goals as of 1 December 2024

Tal Ayela (Hebrew: טל איילה; born May 25, 1989) is an Israeli footballer who plays for Ironi Beit Shemesh F.C.
