= Anas Dabour =

Israeli footballer (born 1991)

Personal information
- Date of birth: 29 April 1991 (age 35)
- Place of birth: Nazareth, Israel
- Positions: Midfielder; winger

Team information
- Current team: Maccabi Akhi Nazareth
- Number: 10

Youth career
- Maccabi Akhi Nazareth

Senior career*
Years	Team	Apps	(Gls)
2009–2014	Maccabi Akhi Nazareth	128	(14)
2014–2015	Maccabi Netanya	5	(0)
2015	Maccabi Akhi Nazareth	14	(1)
2015–2016	Hapoel Haifa	11	(0)
2016	→ Maccabi Akhi Nazareth	12	(1)
2016–2019	Maccabi Akhi Nazareth	35	(5)
2017–2018	→ Hapoel Bnei Lod	52	(17)
2019	Hapoel Iksal	14	(3)
2019–2020	Hapoel Rishon LeZion	36	(4)
2020–2023	Maccabi Akhi Nazareth	106	(21)
2023	Hapoel Acre	3	(0)
2023–2024	Ihud Bnei Shefa-'Amr	22	(2)
2024–2026	F.C. Kafr Qasim	52	(13)
2026	Hapoel Nof HaGalil	14	(3)
2026–	Maccabi Akhi Nazareth	0	(0)
- * Club domestic league appearances and goals as of 24 June 2026

Anas Dabour (Arabic: أَنَس دَبُّور, Hebrew: אנס דאבור; born 29 April 1991) is an Israeli professional footballer who plays a midfielder or winger for Liga Leumit club Maccabi Akhi Nazareth.

== Early life ==
Dabbur was born in Nazareth, Israel, to a Muslim-Arab family. His younger brother Mu'nas Dabbur is also a footballer, who plays for Emirati club Shabab Al-Ahli in the UAE Pro League.

== Career ==
Dabour was born in Nazareth, Israel. He began his career in the youth system of Maccabi Akhi Nazareth. On 29 May 2009, he made his debut at the first team 2–4 loss to Hapoel Bnei Lod. During the 2012–13 season he scored eight league goals was third in the goalscoring records in the club after Alain Masudi and Serge Ayeli with 11 goals each. On 14 May 2014, he was transferred to Maccabi Netanya.
