= Miki Yazo =

Israeli footballer (born 1991)

Personal information
- Full name: Mekonent Yazao
- Date of birth: January 1, 1991 (age 35)
- Place of birth: Tiberias, Israel
- Position: Left back

Team information
- Current team: Ironi Tiberias

Youth career
- 2003–2007: Ironi Tiberias
- 2007–2008: Ironi Kiryat Shmona
- 2008–2009: → Ironi Tiberias (loan)
- 2009–2011: Ironi Kiryat Shmona

Senior career*
Years	Team	Apps	(Gls)
2011–2015	Ironi Kiryat Shmona	1	(0)
2013–2014	→ Hapoel Migdal HaEmek (loan)	30	(0)
2014–2015	→ Ironi Tiberias (loan)	19	(0)
2015–2017	Hapoel Haifa	13	(0)
2017	→ Maccabi Ahi Nazareth (loan)	6	(0)
2017–2018	Hapoel Kfar Saba	22	(1)
2018–2019	Hapoel Acre	26	(0)
2019	Shimshon Kafr Qasim	4	(0)
2019–2020	Ironi Tiberias	14	(1)
2020	Maccabi Bnei Reineh	1	(0)
2020–2021	Hapoel Migdal HaEmek	14	(0)
2021–2023	Ironi Tiberias	19	(0)
2024–	Maccabi Nujeidat	0	(0)
- * Club domestic league appearances and goals as of 15 June 2023

Miki Yazo (Hebrew: מיקי יזאו; born 1 January 1991), also Mekonenet Yazao or Makonant Vazao, is an Israeli footballer who plays for Maccabi Nujeidat

== Sports career ==
Yazo played football as a youth in Tiberias for local club Beitar Tiberias, which became Ironi Tiberias in 2006, and was purchased by Ironi Kiryat Shmona, where he made his senior debut on 12 May 2015. Yazo was loaned to Hapoel Migdal HaEmek and Ironi Tiberias over the next two seasons, and was transferred to Hapoel Haifa in summer 2015.

== See also ==
- Sports in Israel
