= Tadas Kijanskas =

Lithuanian footballer

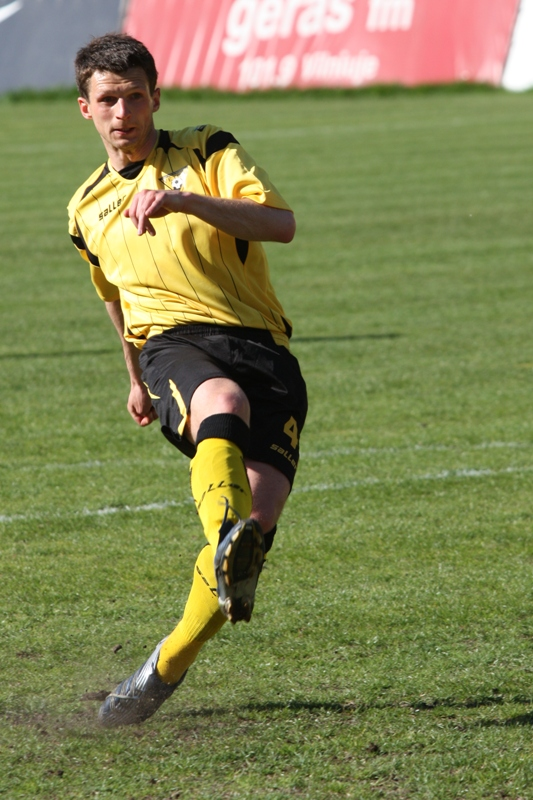
- Kijanskas playing for FK Vėtra in 2009

Personal information
- Full name: Tadas Kijanskas
- Date of birth: 6 September 1985 (age 41)
- Place of birth: Vilnius, Lithuanian SSR, Soviet Union
- Height: 1.84 m (6 ft 1/2 in)
- Position: Centre-back

Senior career*
| Years | Team | Apps | (Gls) |
| 2001–2004 | Kareda Kaunas | | |
| 2005 | FBK Kaunas | 2 | (0) |
| 2005 | Šilutė | 11 | (1) |
| 2006 | FBK Kaunas | 8 | (0) |
| 2007 | Šilutė | 12 | (0) |
| 2007–2009 | Vėtra | 66 | (12) |
| 2010 | Suduva | 12 | (1) |
| 2010–2011 | Jagiellonia Białystok | 16 | (2) |
| 2011–2013 | Korona Kielce | 43 | (2) |
| 2013–2016 | Hapoel Haifa | 92 | (7) |
| 2016–2018 | Zbrojovka Brno | 41 | (0) |
| 2018–2019 | Hapoel Ashkelon | 34 | (0) |
| 2019–2020 | Hapoel Umm al-Fahm | 18 | (1) |
| 2020 | FK Ozas | | |

International career
| | Lithuania U19 | 6 | (0) |
| 2009–2017 | Lithuania | 48 | (1) |
- * Club domestic league appearances and goals

Tadas Kijanskas (born 6 September 1985) is a Lithuanian former professional footballer who played as a centre-back.

== Career ==
=== Club ===
In June 2010, he joined Jagiellonia Białystok on a one-year contract.

In July 2011, he signed a two-year contract with Korona Kielce.

In June 2013, he signed to Hapoel Haifa.

=== International ===
He was a part of Lithuania national football team. Kijanskas scored an own goal in a 1–3 defeat to Spain.

== Honours ==
FBK Kaunas

- A Lyga: 2006
