= Niv Antman =

Israeli footballer (born 1992)

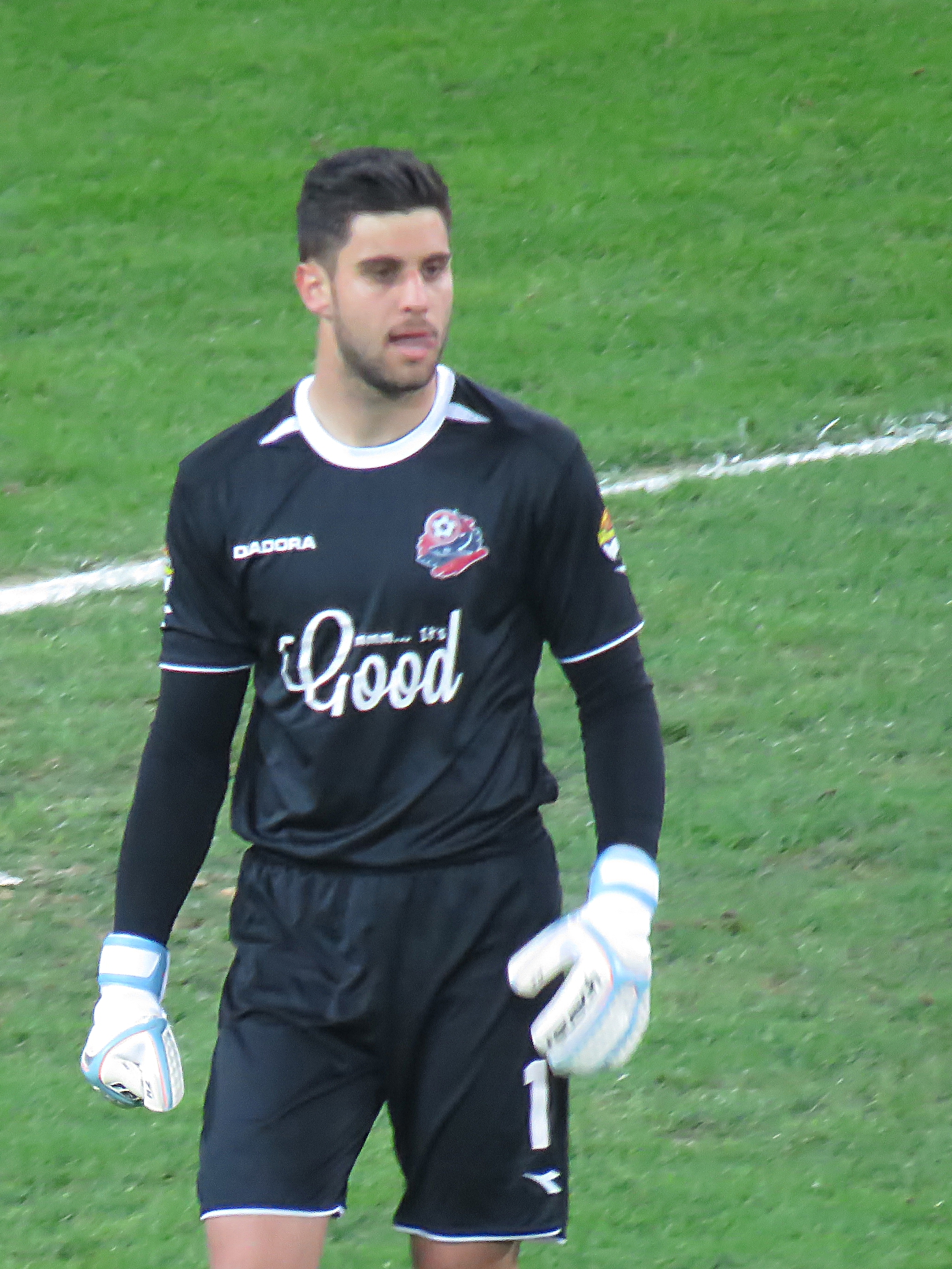

Personal information
- Full name: Niv Antman
- Date of birth: 2 August 1992 (age 34)
- Place of birth: Haifa, Israel
- Height: 1.88 m (6 ft 2 in)
- Position: Goalkeeper

Team information
- Current team: Maccabi Netanya
- Number: 45

Youth career
- 2003–2006: Maccabi Tzur Shalom
- 2006–2008: Maccabi Haifa
- 2008–2012: Hapoel Haifa

Senior career*
Years	Team	Apps	(Gls)
2012–2016	Hapoel Haifa	19	(0)
2016	Hapoel Rishon LeZion	1	(0)
2016–2017	FC Dordrecht	1	(0)
2017–2018	Ironi Nesher	23	(0)
2018–2021	Hapoel Ra'anana	37	(0)
2021–2023	Sektzia Ness Ziona	31	(0)
2023–2026	Hapoel Haifa	27	(0)
2026–	Maccabi Netanya	12	(0)

International career
2011	Israel U19	2	(0)
- * Club domestic league appearances and goals as of 18 May 2026

Niv Antman (Hebrew: ניב אנטמן; born 2 August 1992) is an Israeli professional footballer who plays as a goalkeeper for Israeli club Maccabi Netanya.

== Career ==
Antman, the son of veteran goalkeeper Giora Antman, played in his youth career in Maccabi Tzur Shalom and Maccabi Haifa, before moving to Hapoel Haifa. Antman graduated to the senior team in 2012 and got his break at the first team as replacement for an injured first goalkeeper Tvrtko Kale, playing 6 full matches during the 2013–14 season. In 2015, Antman returned to the team's starting lineup.

In 2011, Antman played two matches with the Israel U19 team, against Belarus.
