= Idan David =

Israeli footballer

Personal information
- Full name: Idan David
- Date of birth: May 21, 1987 (age 39)
- Place of birth: Elyakim, Israel
- Positions: Attacking midfielder; forward

Team information
- Current team: Hapoel Herzliya (manager)

Youth career
- Maccabi Netanya

Senior career*
| Years | Team | Apps | (Gls) |
| 2005–2008 | Maccabi Neranya | 0 | (0) |
| 2007 | → Hapoel Acre | 5 | (0) |
| 2008 | → Maccabi Tirat HaCarmel | 12 | (1) |
| 2008–2010 | Hapoel Hadera | 54 | (25) |
| 2010–2011 | Maccabi Kabilio Jaffa | 31 | (8) |
| 2011 | Maccabi Ironi Jatt | 7 | (4) |
| 2011–2012 | Hapoel Afula | 16 | (9) |
| 2012–2013 | Maccabi Petah Tikva | 8 | (0) |
| 2013 | Hapoel Afula | 14 | (8) |
| 2013–2014 | Maccabi Daliyat al-Karmel | 13 | (6) |
| 2014–2015 | Hapoel Kfar Saba | 49 | (14) |
| 2015–2016 | Ironi Nesher | 13 | (4) |
| 2016–2017 | Hapoel Asi Gilboa | 25 | (5) |
| 2017–2018 | Hapoel Kfar Saba | 27 | (7) |
| 2018–2019 | Hapoel Afula | 32 | (10) |
| 2019–2020 | F.C. Kafr Qasim | 16 | (1) |
| 2020 | Hapoel Kfar Shalem | 5 | (1) |
| 2020–2021 | Hapoel Marmorek | 12 | (3) |
| 2021–2022 | Hapoel Herzliya | 25 | (14) |

International career
| 2004 | Israel U-17 | 2 | (0) |

Managerial career
- 2023–: Hapoel Herzliya
- * Club domestic league appearances and goals

Idan David (Hebrew: עידן דוד) is an Israeli footballer who plays for Hapoel Herzliya.

== Honours ==
- Liga Alef (3):
  - 2012–13, 2013–14, 2015–16
- Liga Leumit (1):
  - 2014–15
