= Adrian Rochet =

Israeli former association footballer and assistant coach

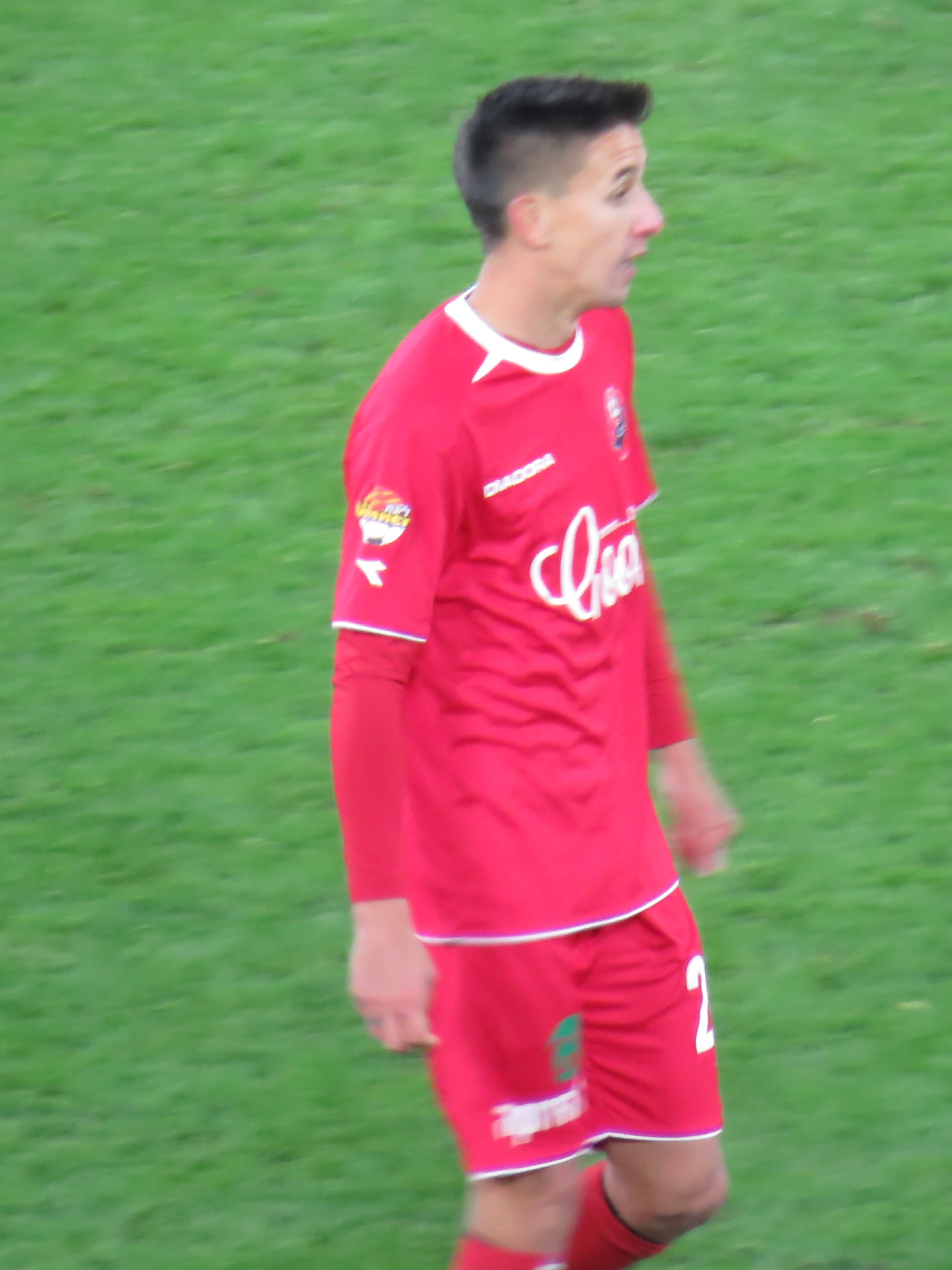
- Rochet playing for Hapoel Haifa in 2016

Personal information
- Full name: Adrian Rochet
- Date of birth: May 26, 1987 (age 39)
- Place of birth: Sa'ar, Israel
- Height: 1.69 m (5 ft 6 1/2 in)
- Position: Midfielder

Youth career
- Ironi Kiryat Shmona

Senior career*
Years	Team	Apps	(Gls)
2006–2015	Ironi Kiryat Shmona	165	(8)
2008–2009	→ Hapoel Nazareth Illit	32	(3)
2015–2016	Hapoel Haifa	28	(0)
2016–2017	Hapoel Acre	35	(7)
2017–2018	Hapoel Petah Tikva	18	(1)
2018	Hapoel Ashkelon	7	(0)
2018–2019	Hapoel Afula	25	(0)
2019–2020	Hapoel Kfar Saba	27	(0)
2020–2022	Ironi Kiryat Shmona	43	(2)
Total		380	(21)

Managerial career
- 2022–2023: Ironi Kiryat Shmona (assistant manager)
- 2025–: Maccabi Haifa (assistant manager)
- * Club domestic league appearances and goals as of 1 June 2022

Adrian Rochet (Hebrew: אדריאן רוצ'ט; born on March 26, 1987) is an Israeli former footballer and current assistant-coach of Israeli club Maccabi Haifa.

== Early and personal life ==
Rochet was born in kibbutz Sa'ar, Israel, to parents Alberto and Monica Rochet, and he is of Argentine-Jewish descent.

He was enlisted to the Israel Defense Forces and served as a soldier for three years.

He is married to his Israeli wife Galit Rochet since 2011; they have three children, and reside in kibbutz Neot Mordechai, Israel.

== Honours ==
=== Club ===
Hapoel Kiryat Shmona

- Israeli Premier League: 2011–12
- Israel State Cup: 2013–14
- Israel Super Cup: 2015
- Toto Cup Al: 2010–11, 2011–12
- Toto Cup Leumit: 2006–07, 2009–10
- Liga Leumit: 2006–07, 2009–10

== See also ==
- List of Jewish footballers
- List of Jews in sports
- List of Jews in sports (non-players)
- List of Israelis
