= Omer Vered =

Israeli footballer

Omer Vered עומר ורד
Personal information
- Full name: Omer Vered
- Date of birth: January 25, 1990 (age 36)
- Place of birth: Tel Aviv, Israel
- Height: 1.77 m (5 ft 10 in)
- Position: Right back

Youth career
- Maccabi Tel Aviv

Senior career*
Years	Team	Apps	(Gls)
2009–2013	Maccabi Tel Aviv	52	(0)
2009–2010	→ Sektzia Ness Ziona (loan)	29	(1)
2010–2011	→ Hapoel Haifa (loan)	30	(1)
2014	Bnei Yehuda Tel Aviv	8	(0)
2014–2015	Hapoel Haifa	12	(0)
2015–2016	Maccabi Netanya	26	(0)
2016–2018	Hapoel Petah Tikva	55	(3)
2018–2019	Hapoel Ra'anana	4	(0)
2019–2020	Hapoel Petah Tikva	16	(0)

International career
2006	Israel U17	3	(0)
2008	Israel U19	5	(0)
2010–2013	Israel U21	8	(1)
- * Club domestic league appearances and goals

Omer Vered (Hebrew: עומר ורד; born 25 January 1990) is an Israeli retired footballer.

== Career ==
Vered grew up in the Maccabi Tel Aviv youth academy. In 2009, Maccabi loaned him out to Israeli second division side, Ness Ziona. For the 2010/11 season he was loaned out to Israeli Premier League club, Hapoel Haifa, where he made his Premier League debut on 21 August 2010. He started 30 matches and scored 1 goal for the club.

After an impressive season with Hapoel Haifa, he returned to Maccabi for the 2011/12 season. During 2011–12 season, Vered played most of the season for Maccabi, including the historic qualification to the European League, and even scored against Dynamo Kyiv.

After finishing his contract in June 2013, Vered turned into a free player in transfer market

On 11 November 2019 it was confirmed, that Vered had joined Hapoel Kfar Shalem. However, 29-year old Vered announced his retirement on 13 January 2020.

== Playing style ==
Vered is a right-footed right back that can also play center back and left back.

== Honours ==
Maccabi Tel Aviv

- Israeli Premier League (1): 2012–13
