= Mahran Lala =

Israeli Druze footballer

Mahran Lala מהראן לאלא
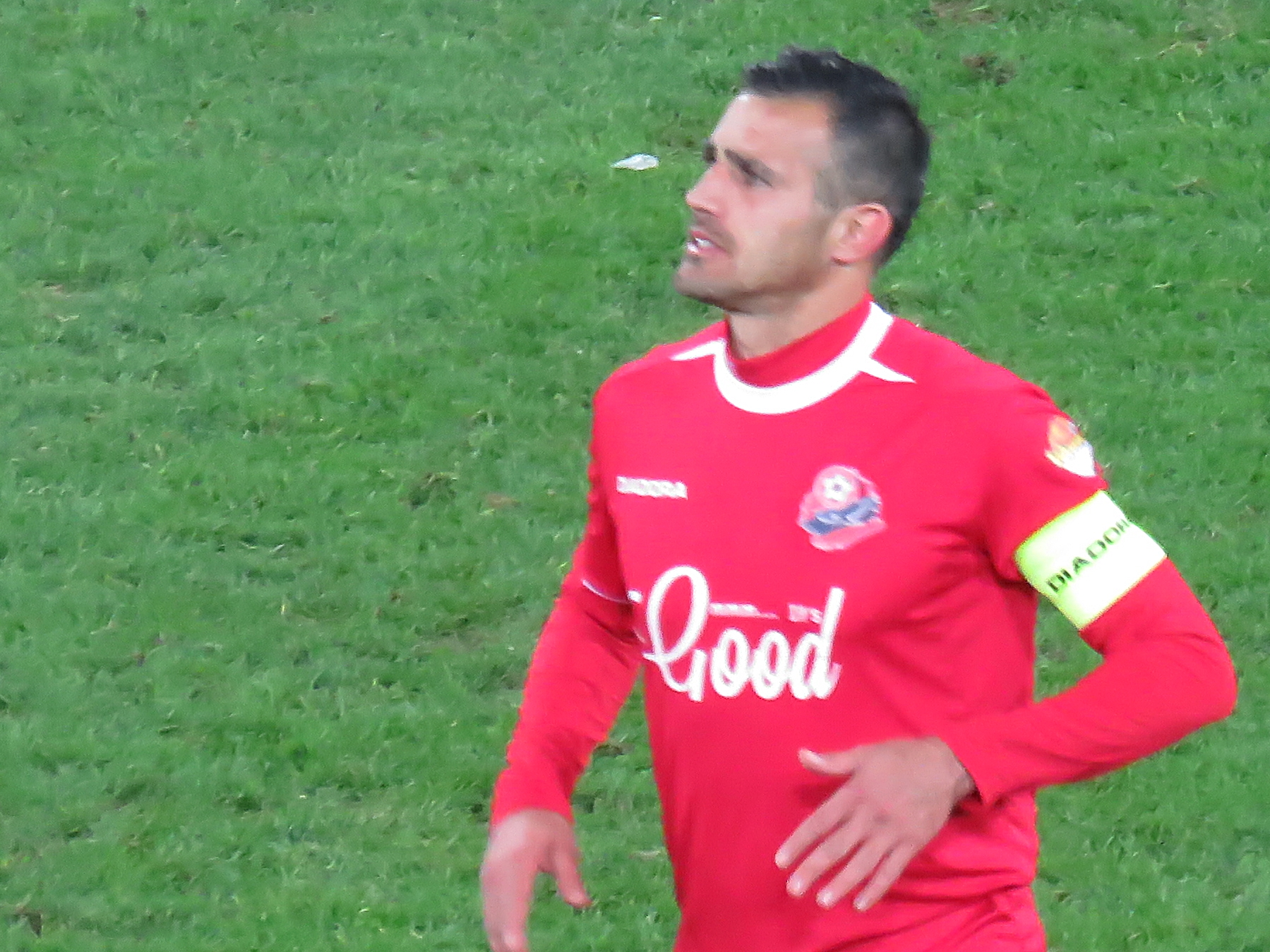

Personal information
- Full name: Al Lala Mahran
- Date of birth: March 7, 1982 (age 44)
- Place of birth: Isfiya, Israel
- Position: Forward

Team information
- Current team: Maccabi Isfiya

Youth career
- Hapoel Haifa

Senior career*
Years	Team	Apps	(Gls)
2001–2004	Maccabi Sha'arayim		
2004–2005	Hapoel Herzliya		
2005–2006	Hapoel Haifa		
2006–2007	Hapoel Bnei Tamra	45	(11)
2007–2008	Maccabi Ahi Nazareth	47	(13)
2008–2012	Hapoel Tel Aviv	95	(15)
2012–2020	Hapoel Haifa	188	(42)
2020–2021	F.C. Holon Yermiyahu	6	(2)
2021	Hapoel Acre	12	(4)
2021–2022	F.C. Ahva Kafr Manda	14	(14)
2022	Maccabi Akhi Nazareth	9	(0)
2022–2023	Maccabi Isfiya	20	(57)

Managerial career
- 2023–2024: Maccabi Akhi Nazareth
- 2024–2025: Hapoel Umm al-Fahm
- * Club domestic league appearances and goals as of 1 June 2025

Mahran Lala (Arabic: مهران لالا, Hebrew: מהראן לאלא; born 7 March 1982) is an Israeli former footballer . Maharan Lala, is in the Hapeol Tel Aviv UEFA cup team, he scored his first European goal, in a 2–1 home defeat to Saint Étienne.

On 17 September 2009, Lala scored the winning goal in Hapoel Tel Aviv's 2–1 2009–10 UEFA Europa League group stage victory over Celtic FC.

== See also ==
- List of Israeli Druze
