= 2016–17 Hapoel Haifa F.C. season =

Hapoel Haifa
2016–17 season
- Chairman: Yoav Katz
- Manager: Eli Cohen (until 8 December 2012); Meir Ben Margi (interim); Dani Golan (13 December 2016 - 25 March 2017); Nir Klinger (from 25 March 2017)
- Stadium: Sammy Ofer
- Ligat Ha'Al: 8th
- State Cup: Quarter final
- Toto Cup: Semi-final
- Top goalscorer: League: Mahran Lala (9); All: Hanan Maman (16)
- Biggest win: 6 - 1 (vs Kafr Qasim, 5 January 2017)
- Biggest defeat: 1 - 5 (vs Hapoel Be'er Sheva, 19 November 2016)
Home colours	Away colours	Third colours

Hapoel Haifa Football Club is an Israeli football club located in Haifa. During the 2016-17 campaign they will be competing in the following competitions:Israeli Premier League, State Cup, Toto Cup Ligat Al.

== Club ==
=== Kits ===
- Provider: Diadora
- Main Sponsor: Sitrus
- Secondary Sponsor: Moked Hat'ama

Home	Away	3rd	4th	GK 1	GK 2

== First team ==
No.	Pos.	Nation	Player
1	GK	ISR	Robi Levkovich
3	DF	ISR	Haim Megrelashvili
4	DF	ISR	Dor Malul
5	DF	ISR	Ofek Fishler
7	MF	ISR	Maxim Plakuschenko
8	MF	ISR	Hisham Kiwan
9	FW	ISR	Eden Ben Basat
10	FW	ISR	Idan Golan
11	FW	ISR	Mahran Lala
12	FW	ISR	Aner Shechter
15	MF	ISR	Hanan Maman
16	DF	POR	Bruno Pinheiro
17	DF	ISR	Ohad Elbilia
18	DF	ISR	Samuel Scheimann

No.	Pos.	Nation	Player
19	FW	ISR	Shlomi Arbeitman
20	FW	ISR	Sa'ar Fadida
21	DF	ISR	Oshri Roash
22	GK	NED	Piet Velthuizen
23	GK	ISR	Rotem Fadida
24	DF	ISR	Liran Serdal
25	FW	MNE	Žarko Korać
26	MF	ISR	Yossi Dora
28	MF	ISR	Ido Vaier
31	FW	BRA	Adilson Bahia
42	MF	ISR	Dor Peretz
55	DF	ISR	Nisso Kapiloto
82	MF	BRA	Júlio César

== Transfers ==
=== Summer ===
In:

No.	Pos.	Nation	Player
—	GK	ISR	Robi Levkovich (from Hapoel Be'er Sheva)
—	GK	NED	Piet Velthuizen (from (Netherlands) Vitesse)
—	DF	ISR	Nisso Kapiloto (from Beitar Jerusalem)
—	MF	BRA	Júlio César (from (Brazil) Capivariano)
—	FW	BRA	Adilson Bahia (from (Brazil) Pelotas)
—	FW	CRO	Filip Jazvić (from (Romania) Târgu Mureș)

Out:

No.	Pos.	Nation	Player
—	FW	ISR	Eli Elbaz (on loan to Hapoel Kfar Saba)
—	GK	ISR	Niv Antman (to (Netherlands) FC Dordrecht)
—	DF	LTU	Tadas Kijanskas ( (Czech Republic) FC Zbrojovka Brno)
—	FW	ISR	Tomer Swisa (to Hapoel Ashkelon)
—	FW	ISR	Amir Abu Nil (on loan to Hapoel Rishon LeZion)
—	MF	ISR	Adrian Rochet (to Hapoel Acre)
—	GK	CRO	Marijan Antolović (to (Slovenia) Koper)
—	MF	BLR	Dzmitry Baha (to (Greece) Atromitos)
—	DF	ISR	Oren Bitton (to Hapoel Ironi Kiryat Shmona)

=== Winter ===
In:

No.	Pos.	Nation	Player
—	DF	ISR	Samuel Scheimann (from Hapoel Tel Aviv)
—	FW	ISR	Eden Ben Basat (from Maccabi Tel Aviv)
—	MF	ISR	Dor Peretz (on loan from Maccabi Tel Aviv)
—	DF	ISR	Ohad Elbilia (came from the youth group)

Out:

No.	Pos.	Nation	Player
—	FW	CRO	Filip Jazvić (to (Romania) Universitatea Craiova)
—	DF	ISR	Miki Yazo (on loan to Maccabi Ahi Nazareth)
—	MF	ISR	Ahad Azam (to Hapoel Bnei Lod)

== Pre-season and friendlies ==
Win Draw Loss

22 July 2016 Training Camp	Hapoel Haifa (Israel)	1 - 2	(Italy) Bologna	Italy
18:00	Bahia	Report	Taïder 55'; Donsah 83'

== Competitions ==
=== Overview ===
Competition	First match	Last match	Starting round	Final position	Record							
Competition	First match	Last match	Starting round	Final position	Pld	W	D	L	GF	GA	GD	Win %
Ligat Ha'Al	20 August 2016	13 May 2017	Matchday 1	8th	33	10	7	16	39	46	−7	30.30
State Cup	5 January 2017	1 March 2017	Eighth Round	Quarter final	4	2	1	1	11	4	+7	50.00
Toto Cup	31 July 2016	15 December 2016	Group Stage	Semi Final	7	2	3	2	11	8	+3	28.57
Total					44	14	11	19	61	58	+3	31.82

Last updated: 13 May 2017.
Source: Competitions

== Ligat Ha'Al ==
=== Results summary ===
Overall								Home						Away					
Pld	W	D	L	GF	GA	GD	Pts	W	D	L	GF	GA	GD	W	D	L	GF	GA	GD
33	10	7	16	39	46	−7	37	5	5	7	21	23	−2	5	2	9	18	23	−5

Last updated: 13 May 2017.

=== Results by matchday ===
Matchday	1	2	3	4	5	6	7	8	9	10	11	12	13	14	15	16	17	18	19	20	21	22	23	24	25	26	27	28	29	30	31	32	33
Ground	A	H	H	A	H	A	H	A	H	A	H	A	H	H	A	A	H	A	H	A	H	A	H	A	H	A	H	A	H	H	A	H	A
Result	L	W	L	W	W	L	L	L	D	L	W	L	L	W	D	W	L	L	W	D	L	W	D	L	L	L	L	W	D	D	W	D	L
Position	10	7	10	6	4	4	6	7	9	11	9	10	11	9	9	8	8	8	8	8	8	8	8	8	8	8	9	8	8	9	8	8	8

Updated to match(es) played on 13 May 2017. Source:
A = Away; H = Home; W = Win; D = Draw; L = Loss

=== Regular season ===
Win Draw Loss

20 August 2016 Match 1	Hapoel Ashkelon	3 - 2	Hapoel Haifa	Ashkelon
20:00	Lingane 29', 71', 90+2' (yellow card) 70'; Aiyenugba (yellow card) 72'	Report	Kapiloto (yellow card) 10'; Malul (yellow card) 52'; Serdal (yellow card) 56'; Elbaz 81'; Bahia 90'	Stadium: Sala; Attendance: 2,244; Referee: Menashe Meshiah

27 August 2016 Match 2	Hapoel Haifa	1 - 0	Bnei Yehuda Tel Aviv	Haifa
18:00	Yazo (yellow card) 14'; Plakuschenko 76'	Report	Kandil (yellow card) 24'; Goldberg (yellow card) 76'; Turgeman (yellow card) 90+3'	Stadium: Sammy Ofer; Referee: Shalom Ben Avraham

10 September 2016 Match 3	Hapoel Haifa	1 - 2	Hapoel Kfar Saba	Haifa
20:00	Dora (yellow card) 30'; Maman 61'; Bahia (yellow card) 90'	Report	Kachuba (yellow card) 11'; Tchibota 12'; Elbaz (yellow card) 26' (goal) 84'; Kadoch (yellow card) 89'; Ayela (yellow card) 90'	Stadium: Sammy Ofer; Attendance: 2,500; Referee: Idan Layba

17 September 2016 Match 4	F.C. Ashdod	1 - 3	Hapoel Haifa	Ashdod
20:00	Kinda (yellow card) 30'; Bitton 59'	Report	Lala 26'; Kapiloto (yellow card) 31'; Velthuizen (yellow card) 49'; César 64'; Bahia 72'; Plakuschenko (yellow card) 83'	Stadium: Yud-Alef; Attendance: 830; Referee: Liran Liani

24 September 2016 Match 5	Hapoel Haifa	4 - 0	Beitar Jerusalem	Haifa
20:10	Bahia 4', 15'; Yazo (yellow card) 59'; Kapiloto (yellow card) 74'; Plakuschenko (yellow card) 81'; Pinheiro (yellow card) 88'; Jazvić 89'; Arbeitman 90' (yellow card) 90'	Report	Shechter (yellow card) 27'; Einbinder (yellow card) 41'; Cohen (yellow card) 45'; Keltjens (yellow card) 53'	Stadium: Sammy Ofer; Attendance: 6,000; Referee: Oren Siminyan

1 October 2016 Match 6	Hapoel Ra'anana	2 - 0	Hapoel Haifa	Netanya
18:00	Vehava 76'; Shaker 86'	Report	Megrelashvili (yellow card) 65'	Stadium: Netanya; Referee: Gal Leivovich

22 October 2016 Match 7	Hapoel Haifa	0 - 2	Hapoel Tel Aviv	Haifa
18:15	Bahia (yellow card) 48'; Pinheiro (yellow card) 61'; Arbeitman (yellow card) 61'; Kapiloto (yellow card) 79'; Maman (yellow card) 81'	Report	Shish (yellow card) 35'; Altman 49'; Reichert (yellow card) 50'; Gotlieb 61'	Stadium: Sammy Ofer; Referee: Eitan Shmuelevich

29 October 2015 Match 8	Bnei Sakhnin	2 - 1	Hapoel Haifa	Sakhnin
16:00	Lax (yellow card) 53'; Avidor 57'; Wanderson (yellow card) 62'; Nworuh 67'	Report	Bahia (yellow card) 90'; Kapiloto 90+3'	Stadium: Doha; Attendance: 1,500; Referee: Alon Yefet

5 November 2016 Match 9	Hapoel Haifa	0 - 0	Maccabi Haifa	Haifa
21:00	Bahia (yellow card) 68'	Report	Keinan (yellow card) 20'; Menahem (yellow card) 59'; Lavi (yellow card) 65'	Stadium: Sammy Ofer; Attendance: 25,300; Referee: Ziv Adler

19 November 2016 Match 10	Hapoel Be'er Sheva	5 - 1	Hapoel Haifa	Be'er Sheva
20:30	Ohana 3'; Ogu (yellow card) 27'; Vítor (yellow card) 29'; Sahar 44' (pen.); Nwakaeme 58'; Radi 65'; Ghadir 85'	Report	Maman 30'; Pinheiro (yellow card) 63'	Stadium: Turner; Attendance: 15,272; Referee: Eli Hachmom

26 November 2016 Match 11	Hapoel Haifa	2 - 1	Maccabi Petah Tikva	Haifa
18:00	César 17'; Bahia (yellow card) 20' (yellow-red card) 46'; Maman 52' (yellow card) 58'; Jazvić (yellow card) 58'	Report	Zhairi 5' (yellow card) 22'; Kalibat (yellow card) 16'	Stadium: Sammy Ofer; Attendance: 2,080; Referee: Igal Farid

3 December 2016 Match 12	Hapoel Ironi Kiryat Shmona	2 - 0	Hapoel Haifa	Kiryat Shmona
16:00	Azulay 38'; Abed 71'	Report	Levkovich (red card) 68'; Pinheiro (yellow card) 87' (red card) 87'	Stadium: Kiryat Shmona Municipal; Attendance: 950; Referee: Daniel Bar Natan

11 December 2016 Match 13	Hapoel Haifa	2 - 4	Maccabi Tel Aviv	Haifa
20:15	Lala 51'; Maman 71'; César (yellow card) 90'	Report	Rikan (yellow card) 21'; Yehezkel (yellow card) 25'; Micha 34' (yellow card) 44'; Fishler 39' (o.g.); Igeibor (yellow card) 65'; Alberman 79'; Kjartansson 88'	Stadium: Sammy Ofer; Attendance: 3,300; Referee: Ziv Adler

18 December 2016 Match 14	Hapoel Haifa	3 - 1	Hapoel Ashkelon	Haifa
19:00	Pinheiro (yellow card) 33'; Malul (yellow card) 65'; Lala (penalty missed) 67' 67', 76'; Maman (yellow card) 74'; Serdal (yellow card) 79'; Arbeitman 90'	Report	Lingane 19' (yellow card) 70'; Malka (yellow card) 23'; Dao (yellow card) 60'; Lugasi (yellow card) 63'; Oremuš (yellow card) 78'	Stadium: Sammy Ofer; Attendance: 1,300; Referee: Menashe Meshiah

24 December 2016 Match 15	Bnei Yehuda Tel Aviv	1 - 1	Hapoel Haifa	Petah Tikva
16:00	Buzaglo 22'	Report	Arbeitman 30'; Pinheiro (yellow card) 87'	Stadium: HaMoshava; Attendance: 1,584; Referee: Alon Yefet

31 December 2016 Match 16	Hapoel Kfar Saba	1 - 2	Hapoel Haifa	Kfar Saba
16:00	Cohen 47'; Braun (yellow card) 67'; Fadida (yellow card) 70' (yellow-red card) 78'; Simovića (yellow card) 78'	Report	César (yellow card) 30'; Plakuschenko 86'; Maman (yellow card) 89' (goal) 90+3'; Golan (yellow card) 90'	Stadium: Levita; Referee: Eli Hachmon

11 January 2017 Match 17	Hapoel Haifa	0 - 1	F.C. Ashdod	Haifa
21:00	Kapiloto (yellow card) 29'; Roash (yellow card) 60' (yellow-red card) 64'; Maman (yellow card) 73'; Bahia (yellow card) 87'; Arbeitman (yellow card) 90'	Report	David 12' (yellow card) 60'; Inbrum (yellow card) 63' (yellow-red card) 68'; Bagarić (yellow card) 90'	Stadium: Sammy Ofer; Referee: David Fuxman

15 January 2017 Match 18	Beitar Jerusalem	1 - 0	Hapoel Haifa	Jerusalem
20:15	Einbinder 7'; Vered (yellow card) 80'; Moyal (yellow card) 86'	Report	Serdal (yellow card) 12'; Scheimann (yellow card) 30'; Velthuizen (yellow card) 76'	Stadium: Teddy; Attendance: 3,500; Referee: Daniel Bar Natan

21 January 2017 Match 19	Hapoel Haifa	1 - 0	Hapoel Ra'anana	Haifa
18:00	Kiwan (yellow card) 19'; Serdal (yellow card) 57'; Lala 61'; Arbeitman (yellow card) 88'	Report	Nimni (yellow card) 49'; Vehava 82'	Stadium: Sammy Ofer; Attendance: 2,050; Referee: Oren Siminyan

29 January 2017 Match 20	Hapoel Tel Aviv	0 - 0	Hapoel Haifa	Petah Tikva
20:15	Yadin (yellow card) 84'	Report	César (yellow card) 63'; Malul (yellow card) 70'	Stadium: HaMoshava; Attendance: 5,350; Referee: Alon Yefet

4 February 2017 Match 21	Hapoel Haifa	0 - 1	Bnei Sakhnin	Haifa
18:00	César (yellow card) 42'; Ben Basat (yellow card) 58'	Report	Khalaila (yellow card) 24'; Shemesh 83'	Stadium: Sammy Ofer; Attendance: 4,100; Referee: Zvika Levi

11 February 2017 Match 22	Maccabi Haifa	0 - 3	Hapoel Haifa	Haifa
16:00	Vacek (yellow card) 17'; Alushi (yellow card) 84'	Report	Lala 28', 76'; Scheimann (yellow card) 27'; Arbeitman 84'	Stadium: Sammy Ofer; Attendance: 27,643; Referee: Roei Rainsriber

19 February 2017 Match 23	Hapoel Haifa	0 - 0	Hapoel Be'er Sheva	Haifa
20:15	Scheimann (yellow card) 13'; Kapiloto (yellow card) 51'; Peretz (yellow card) 56'	Report		Stadium: Sammy Ofer; Attendance: 4,400; Referee: Gal Leivovich

26 February 2017 Match 24	Maccabi Petah Tikva	3 - 1	Hapoel Haifa	Petah Tikva
19:00	Melamed 6'; Zhairi (yellow card) 13'; Pires (yellow card) 17' (goal) 90+6'; Gabay (yellow card) 27'; Kanyuk 69'; Magbo (yellow card) 78'	Report	Serdal (yellow card) 36'; Maman 50' (yellow card) 65'; Malul (yellow card) 61'; Peretz (yellow card) 90+3'	Stadium: HaMoshava; Attendance: 1,700; Referee: Shalom Ben Avraham

4 March 2017 Match 25	Hapoel Haifa	1 - 2	Hapoel Ironi Kiryat Shmona	Haifa
16:00	Kapiloto (yellow card) 31'; Peretz (yellow card) 61'; Lala 90+1'	Report	Brossou (yellow card) 15'; Gozlan 36', 49'; Tzalisher (yellow card) 50'	Stadium: Sammy Ofer; Attendance: 2,136; Referee: Erez Papir

12 March 2017 Match 26	Maccabi Tel Aviv	1 - 0	Hapoel Haifa	Netanya
20:15	Peretz 24' (o.g.); Dasa (yellow card) 63'; Marcelo (yellow card) 90'	Report	Roash (yellow card) 73'	Stadium: Netanya; Attendance: 9,500; Referee: Ziv Adler

==== Regular season table ====
Pos	Team	Pld	W	D	L	GF	GA	GD	Pts	Qualification or relegation
6	Maccabi Haifa	26	10	8	8	30	25	+5	38	Qualification for the Championship round
7	Ironi Kiryat Shmona	26	9	8	9	35	33	+2	35	Qualification for the Relegation round
8	Hapoel Haifa	26	8	4	14	29	36	−7	28	Qualification for the Relegation round
9	F.C. Ashdod	26	6	10	10	15	26	−11	28	Qualification for the Relegation round
10	Hapoel Ra'anana	26	7	7	12	14	29	−15	28	Qualification for the Relegation round

Source: Israel Football Association, Soccerway
Rules for classification: 1) Points; 2) Goal difference; 3) Matches won; 4) Goals scored; 5) Head-to-head points; 6) Head-to-head goal difference; 7) Head-to-head goals scored; 8) Play-off.

==== Results overview ====
Win Draw Loss

Opposition	Home score	Away score
Beitar Jerusalem	4 - 0	0 - 1
Bnei Sakhnin	1 - 2	0 - 1
Bnei Yehuda Tel Aviv	1 - 0	1 - 1
F.C. Ashdod	3 - 1	0 - 1
Hapoel Ashkelon	3 - 1	2 - 3
Hapoel Be'er Sheva	0 - 0	1 - 5
Hapoel Ra'anana	1 - 0	0 - 2
Hapoel Ironi Kiryat Shmona	1 - 2	0 - 2
Hapoel Kfar Saba	1 - 2	2 - 1
Hapoel Tel Aviv	0 - 2	0 - 0
Maccabi Haifa	0 - 0	3 - 0
Maccabi Petah Tikva	2 - 1	1 - 3
Maccabi Tel Aviv	2 - 4	0 - 1

=== Play-off ===
18 March 2017 Match 27	Hapoel Haifa	1 - 4	Hapoel Ashkelon	Haifa
18:00	Ben Basat 45'	Report	Manga 42'; Hozez (yellow card) 43' (goal) 47'; Malka (yellow card) 55'; Lingane 69', 85'; Jovanović (yellow card) 83'	Stadium: Sammy Ofer; Attendance: 1,500; Referee: Roei Rainshraiber

1 April 2017 Match 28	Hapoel Ironi Kiryat Shmona	0 - 2	Hapoel Haifa	Kiryat Shmona
18:00	Kassio (yellow card) 76'	Report	Arbeitman 10'; Plakuschenko (yellow card) 30'; Serdal (yellow card) 38' (goal) 60'	Stadium: Kiryat Shmona Municipal; Referee: David Fuxman

8 April 2017 Match 29	Hapoel Haifa	3 - 3	Hapoel Tel Aviv	Haifa
16:00	Bahia 7' (yellow card) 9'; Plakuschenko 43'; Roash (yellow card) 76'; Lala 79'; Ben Basat (yellow card) 81'	Report	Altman 16'; Chibuike 31'; Barshazki (yellow card) 54'; Yadin (yellow card) 61'; Hirsh 83'; Meshumar (yellow card) 90'	Stadium: Sammy Ofer; Attendance: 6,700; Referee: Menashe Meshiah

22 April 2017 Match 30	Hapoel Haifa	1 - 1	F.C. Ashdod	Haifa
18:00	César (yellow card) 29'; Ben Basat 82'	Report	Inbrum 23' (yellow card) 76'; Lúcio (yellow card) 69'	Stadium: Sammy Ofer; Referee: Igal Farid

27 April 2017 Match 31	Hapoel Ra'anana	0 - 2	Hapoel Haifa	Netanya
19:30	Shaker (yellow card) 45'; Shukrani (yellow card) 57'; Abuhatzira (yellow card) 84'; Shabtay (red card) 89'	Report	Plakuschenko 52'; Babayev 59' (o.g.)	Stadium: Netanya; Referee: Asa'ad Jabarin

6 May 2017 Match 32	Hapoel Haifa	1 - 1	Bnei Yehuda Tel Aviv	Haifa
19:00	Malul 49'; Levkovich (yellow card) 54'; Pinheiro (yellow card) 62'	Report	Mršić 54' (pen.)	Stadium: Sammy Ofer; Referee: Eli Hachmon

13 May 2017 Match 33	Hapoel Kfar Saba	1 - 0	Hapoel Haifa	Kfar Saba
20:30	César (yellow card) 49'	Report	Tchibota (yellow card) 8'; Simović (yellow card) 25'; Elbaz 42'; Fadida (yellow card) 60'	Stadium: Levita; Referee: Menashe Meshiah

==== Relegation round table ====
Pos	Team	Pld	W	D	L	GF	GA	GD	Pts	Relegation
7	Ironi Kiryat Shmona	33	10	9	14	44	48	−4	39	
8	Hapoel Haifa	33	10	7	16	39	46	−7	37	
9	F.C. Ashdod	33	7	15	11	22	32	−10	36	
10	Hapoel Ra'anana	33	9	9	15	22	40	−18	36	
11	Bnei Yehuda (Q)	33	8	11	14	26	39	−13	35	Qualification for the Europa League second qualifying round (Note: Bnei Yehuda qualified for the Europa League Second qualifying round by winning the 2016–17 Israel State Cup)
12	Hapoel Ashkelon	33	7	11	15	24	42	−18	32	
13	Hapoel Kfar Saba (R)	33	7	10	16	23	40	−17	31	Relegation to Liga Leumit
14	Hapoel Tel Aviv (Note: Hapoel Tel Aviv were deducted nine points for entering administration.) (R)	33	8	14	11	29	34	−5	29	Relegation to Liga Leumit

Source: Israel Football Association, Soccerway
Rules for classification: 1) Points; 2) Goal difference; 3) Matches won; 4) Goals scored; 5) Head-to-head points; 6) Head-to-head goal difference; 7) Head-to-head goals scored; 8) Play-off.
(Q) Qualified for the phase indicated; (R) Relegated

==== Results overview ====
Win Draw Loss

Opposition	Home score	Away score
Bnei Yehuda Tel Aviv	1 - 1	
F.C. Ashdod	1 - 1	
Hapoel Ashkelon	1 - 4	
Hapoel Ironi Kiryat Shmona		2 - 0
Hapoel Kfar Saba		0 - 1
Hapoel Ra'anana		2 - 0
Hapoel Tel Aviv	3 - 3	

== State Cup ==
=== Round of 32 ===
5 January 2017 Round of 32	Hapoel Haifa	6 - 1	Kafr Qasim	Haifa
19:30	Malul 4'; Maman 8', 11', 17', 18'; Megrelashvili 32'	Report	Sarsor 90+1'	Stadium: Sammy Ofer; Referee: Aviad Shiloach

=== Round of 16 ===
24 January 2017 round of 16	Hapoel Haifa	3 - 0	Hapoel Rishon LeZion	Haifa
19:00	Maman 11', 58'; Bahia 88'	Report	Strul (red card) 53'	Stadium: Sammy Ofer; Referee: Roei Rainshraiber

=== Quarter final ===
8 February 2017 First leg	Hapoel Haifa	1 - 1	Hapoel Ramat Gan	Haifa
19:00	Ben Basat 75'	Report	Pshechazki (yellow card) 66'; Rosh 78'	Stadium: Sammy Ofer Stadium; Referee: Gal Leivovich

1 March 2017 Second leg	Hapoel Ramat Gan	2 - 1 (3 – 2 agg.)	Hapoel Haifa	Ramat Gan
20:50	Mkonen (yellow card) 45'; Tiram (yellow card) 59' (yellow-red card) 82'; Khalaila 77'; Pshechazki (yellow card) 80'; Cohen 86'	Report	Kapiloto (yellow card) 24'; Arbeitman (yellow card) 83'; Lala 90'	Stadium: Ramat Gan; Referee: Menashe Meshiah

== Toto Cup ==
=== Group stage ===
Pos	Team	Pld	W	D	L	GF	GA	GD	Pts	Qualification or relegation
1	Maccabi Haifa	4	3	1	0	6	3	+3	10	Qualified to Quarter-finals
2	Hapoel Haifa	4	1	2	1	5	4	+1	5	Qualified to Quarter-finals
3	Hapoel Kiryat Shmona	4	0	4	0	2	2	0	4	Qualified to Quarter-finals
4	Bnei Sakhnin	4	0	3	1	4	5	−1	3	
5	Hapoel Kfar Saba	4	0	2	2	2	5	−3	2	

Updated to match(es) played on 16 August 2016. Source: Israel Football Association
Rules for classification: 1) points; 2) goal difference; 3) number of wins; 4) goals scored; 5) head to head; 6)deciding match.

31 July 2016 1	Hapoel Haifa	2 - 2	Bnei Sakhnin	Acre
19:00	Maman (yellow card) 24'; Plakuschenko 55', 58'	Report	Safouri 7' (pen.) (yellow card) 57'; Avidor 18'; Ottman (yellow card) 53'	Stadium: Acre Municipal; Referee: Orel Grinfeld

3 August 2016 2	Hapoel Kfar Saba	0 - 2	Hapoel Haifa	Kfar Saba
19:15	Kapiloto (yellow card) 29' (goal) 53'; Fishler (yellow card) 28'; Maman 69'; Dora (yellow card) 85'	Report	Itzhak (yellow card) 56'; Fadida (yellow card) 83'	Stadium: Levita; Referee: Oren Siminyan

9 August 2016 4	Hapoel Haifa	1 - 1	Hapoel Ironi Kiryat Shmona	Acre
19:15	Maman 33'; Dora (yellow card) 59'; Plakuschenko (yellow card) 77'	Report	Mauricio 4'; Kriaf (yellow card) 50'; Kassio (yellow card) 79'; Belilti (yellow card) 79'	Stadium: Acre Municipal; Referee: Daniel Bar Natan

16 August 2016 5	Maccabi Haifa	1 - 0	Hapoel Haifa	Netanya
19:30	Mugrabi 79'	Report		Stadium: Netanya; Attendance: 2,500; Referee: Eitan Shmuelevitz

=== Quarter final ===
26 November 2016 first leg	Hapoel Tel Aviv	0 - 3	Hapoel Haifa	Petah Tikva
21:00	Shish (yellow card) 30'	Report	Kiwan 27'; Maman 73', 77'; Shechter (yellow card) 90'	Stadium: HaMoshava; Referee: Idan Layba

29 November 2016 second leg	Hapoel Haifa	2 - 2 (5 – 2 agg.)	Hapoel Tel Aviv	Haifa
21:00	Plakuschenko (yellow card) 52'; Shechter 61'; Lala 71'	Report	Schoenfeld (yellow card) 27'; Ezra 34' (yellow card) 43'; Biton 45+3'; Swisa (yellow card) 73'	Stadium: Sammy Ofer; Referee: Shalom Ben Avraham

=== Semi-final ===
15 December 2016 Semi Final	Hapoel Be'er Sheva	2 - 1	Hapoel Haifa	Netanya
19:30	Barda (yellow card) 10'; Sahar (yellow card) 35' (goal) 44', 53' (pen.); Shabtay (yellow card) 45'; Bitton (yellow card) 90'	Report	Jazvić 10'; Fishler (yellow card) 38'; Serdal (yellow card) 63'	Stadium: Netanya; Referee: Oren Simanian

== Statistics ==
=== Appearances and goals ===
No.	Pos	Nat	Player	Total		Ligat Ha'Al		State Cup		Toto Cup	
No.	Pos	Nat	Player	Apps	Goals	Apps	Goals	Apps	Goals	Apps	Goals
1	GK	(Israel) ISR	Robi Levkovich	13	0	7	0	3	0	3	0
3	DF	(Israel) ISR	Haim Megrelashvili	29	1	22	0	2	1	5	0
4	DF	(Israel) ISR	Dor Malul	37	2	30	1	4	1	3	0
5	DF	(Israel) ISR	Ofek Fishler	16	0	8	0	2	0	6	0
7	MF	(Israel) ISR	Maxim Plakuschenko	37	6	28	4	2	0	7	2
8	MF	(Israel) ISR	Hisham Kiwan	23	1	13	0	4	0	6	1
9	FW	(Israel) ISR	Eden Ben Basat	16	3	14	2	2	1	0	0
10	FW	(Israel) ISR	Idan Golan	23	0	16	0	2	0	5	0
11	FW	(Israel) ISR	Mahran Lala	37	11	30	9	4	1	3	1
12	FW	(Israel) ISR	Aner Shechter	4	1	0	0	1	0	3	1
15	MF	(Israel) ISR	Hanan Maman	42	16	31	6	4	6	7	4
16	DF	(Portugal) POR	Bruno Pinheiro	30	0	25	0	3	0	2	0
17	DF	(Israel) ISR	Ohad Elbilia	0	0	0	0	0	0	0	0
18	DF	(Israel) ISR	Samuel Scheimann	18	0	16	0	2	0	0	0
19	FW	(Israel) ISR	Shlomi Arbeitman	34	5	25	5	4	0	5	0
20	FW	(Israel) ISR	Sa'ar Fadida	12	0	6	0	0	0	6	0
21	DF	(Israel) ISR	Oshri Roash	18	0	11	0	2	0	5	0
22	GK	(Netherlands) NED	Piet Velthuizen	33	0	27	0	1	0	5	0
23	GK	(Israel) ISR	Rotem Fadida	1	0	1	0	0	0	0	0
24	DF	(Israel) ISR	Liran Serdal	40	1	31	1	2	0	7	0
25	FW	(Montenegro) MNE	Žarko Korać	1	0	0	0	0	0	1	0
26	MF	(Israel) ISR	Yossi Dora	6	0	2	0	0	0	4	0
28	MF	(Israel) ISR	Ido Vaier	6	0	1	0	0	0	5	0
31	FW	(Brazil) BRA	Adilson Bahia	40	6	31	5	4	1	5	0
42	MF	(Israel) ISR	Dor Peretz	16	0	14	0	2	0	0	0
55	DF	(Israel) ISR	Nisso Kapiloto	39	2	32	1	2	0	5	1
82	MF	(Brazil) BRA	Júlio César	31	2	23	2	4	0	4	0
Players away from Hapoel Haifa on loan:
6	DF	(Israel) ISR	Miki Yazo	7	0	4	0	0	0	3	0
14	MF	(Israel) ISR	Eli Elbaz	3	1	1	1	0	0	2	0
Players who appeared for Hapoel Haifa that left during the season:
9	MF	(Croatia) CRO	Filip Jazvić	16	2	13	1	0	0	3	1

=== Goalscorers ===
Rank	No.	Pos	Nat	Name	Ligat Ha'Al	State Cup	Toto Cup	Total
1	15	MF	(Israel)	Hanan Maman	6	6	4	16
2	11	FW	(Israel)	Mahran Lala	9	1	1	11
3	31	FW	(Brazil)	Adilson Bahia	5	1	0	6
3	7	MF	(Israel)	Maxim Plakuschenko	4	0	2	6
5	19	FW	(Israel)	Shlomi Arbeitman	5	0	0	5
6	9	FW	(Israel)	Eden Ben Basat	2	1	0	3
7	82	MF	(Brazil)	Júlio César	2	0	0	2
7	4	DF	(Israel)	Dor Malul	1	1	0	2
7	9	FW	(Croatia)	Filip Jazvić	1	0	1	2
7	55	DF	(Israel)	Nisso Kapiloto	1	0	1	2
11	14	FW	(Israel)	Eli Elbaz	1	0	0	1
11	24	DF	(Israel)	Liran Serdal	1	0	0	1
11	3	DF	(Israel)	Haim Megrelashvili	0	1	0	1
11	8	MF	(Israel)	Hisham Kiwan	0	0	1	1
11	12	FW	(Israel)	Aner Shechter	0	0	1	1
Own goal					1	0	0	1
Totals					39	11	11	61

Last updated: 13 May 2017
