= 2016–17 Israeli Premier League =

Israeli Premier League
- Season: 2016–17
- Dates: 20 August 2016 – 20 May 2017
- Champions: Hapoel Be'er Sheva
- Relegated: Hapoel Kfar Saba; Hapoel Tel Aviv
- Champions League: Hapoel Be'er Sheva
- Europa League: Maccabi Tel Aviv; Beitar Jerusalem; Bnei Yehuda
- Matches: 240
- Goals: 524 (2.18 per match)
- Top goalscorer: Viðar Örn Kjartansson (19 goals)
- Biggest home win: Maccabi Tel Aviv 5–0 Hapoel Tel Aviv; Hapoel Be'er Sheva 5–0 Maccabi Petah Tikva; Maccabi Haifa 5–0 Hapoel Ashkelon; Hapoel Be'er Sheva 5–0 F.C. Ashdod
- Biggest away win: Hapoel Ashkelon 1–5 Hapoel Be'er Sheva; Hapoel Ra'anana 0–4 Beitar Jerusalem
- Highest scoring: Bnei Sakhnin 5–2 Ironi Kiryat Shmona
- Highest attendance: 27,819; Maccabi Haifa 1–0 Hapoel Tel Aviv (22 August 2016)
- Lowest attendance: 600; Ironi Kiryat Shmona 0–0 Hapoel Ra'anana (20 August 2016)
- Average attendance: 6,194
- All statistics correct as of 11 February 2017.

The 2016–17 Israeli Premier League was the eighteenth season since its introduction in 1999 and the 75th season of top-tier football in Israel. It began on 20 August 2016 and ended on 20 May 2017.

Hapoel Be'er Sheva won a back-to-back title, finishing 13 points ahead of Maccabi Tel Aviv.

== Teams ==
A total of fourteen teams were competing in the league, including twelve sides from the 2015–16 season and two promoted teams from the 2015–16 Liga Leumit.

Maccabi Netanya and Hapoel Acre were relegated to the 2016–17 Liga Leumit after finishing the 2015–16 Israeli Premier League in the bottom two places.

F.C. Ashdod and Hapoel Ashkelon were promoted after finishing the 2015–16 Liga Leumit in the top two places.

=== Stadia and locations ===
Locations of the 2016–17 Israeli Premier League teams

Team	Location	Stadium	Capacity
Beitar Jerusalem	Jerusalem	Teddy Stadium	31,733
Bnei Sakhnin	Sakhnin	Doha Stadium	8,500
Bnei Yehuda	Tel Aviv	HaMoshava Stadium, Petah Tikva	11,500
F.C. Ashdod	Ashdod	Yud-Alef Stadium	7,800
Hapoel Ashkelon	Ashkelon	Sala Stadium	5,250
Hapoel Be'er Sheva	Be'er Sheva	Turner Stadium	16,126
Hapoel Haifa	Haifa	Sammy Ofer Stadium	30,950
Hapoel Kfar Saba	Kfar Saba	Levita Stadium	5,800
Hapoel Ra'anana	Ra'anana	Netanya Stadium, Netanya	13,610
Hapoel Tel Aviv	Tel Aviv	HaMoshava Stadium, Petah Tikva	11,500
Ironi Kiryat Shmona	Kiryat Shmona	Kiryat Shmona Stadium	5,300
Maccabi Haifa	Haifa	Sammy Ofer Stadium	30,950
Maccabi Petah Tikva	Petah Tikva	HaMoshava Stadium	11,500
Maccabi Tel Aviv	Tel Aviv	Netanya Stadium, Netanya	13,610

HaMoshava Stadium	Netanya Stadium	Sammy Ofer Stadium	
Bnei Yehuda; Hapoel Tel Aviv; Maccabi Petah Tikva	Hapoel Ra'anana; Maccabi Tel Aviv	Hapoel Haifa; Maccabi Haifa	
Doha Stadium	Kiryat Shmona Stadium	Levita Stadium	
Bnei Sakhnin	Ironi Kiryat Shmona	Hapoel Kfar Saba	
Sala Stadium	Teddy Stadium	Turner Stadium	Yud-Alef Stadium
Hapoel Ashkelon	Beitar Jerusalem	Hapoel Be'er Sheva	F.C. Ashdod

=== Personnel and sponsorship ===
Team	President	Manager	Captain	Kitmaker	Shirt sponsor
Beitar Jerusalem	(Israel) Eli Tabib	(Israel) Sharon Mimer	(Israel) Dan Einbinder	Givova	
Bnei Sakhnin	(Israel) Mohammed Abu Yunes	(Israel) Yossi Abuksis	(Israel) Khaled Khalaila	Givova	Scania
Bnei Yehuda	(Israel) Barak Obramov	(Israel) Nissan Yehezkel	(Israel) Hasan Abu Zaid	Kappa	Landora Group
F.C. Ashdod	(Israel) Jacky Ben-Zaken	(Israel) Ran Ben Shimon	(Israel) Moshe Ohayon	Jartazi	SeeMe
Hapoel Ashkelon	(Israel) Municipality of Ashkelon	(Israel) Yuval Naim	(Israel) Kobi Ben Hemo	Joma	Albar
Hapoel Be'er Sheva	(Israel) Alona Barkat	(Israel) Barak Bakhar	(Israel) Elyaniv Barda	Puma	Tadiran
Hapoel Haifa	(Israel) Yoav Katz	(Israel) Dani Golan	(Israel) Oshri Roash	Diadora	Citrus
Hapoel Kfar Saba	(Israel) Stav Shaham	(Israel) Eli Cohen	(Israel) Hen Dilmoni	Macron	Trigo
Hapoel Ra'anana	(Israel) Asher Alon	(Israel) Haim Silvas	(Israel) Snir Shuker	Umbro	ME Tel Aviv
Hapoel Tel Aviv	(Israel) Nisanov Group	(Israel) Meni Koretski	(Israel) Avihai Yadin	Nike	GETDRIVE
Ironi Kiryat Shmona	(Israel) Izzy Sheratzky	(Israel) Tomer Kashtan	(Israel) Ahmed Abed	Umbro	Ituran
Maccabi Haifa	(Israel) Ya'akov Shahar	(Israel) Guy Luzon	(Israel) Dekel Keinan	Nike	Honda
Maccabi Petah Tikva	(Israel) Amos Luzon	(Israel) Kobi Refua	(Israel) Naor Peser	Macron	Panorama North
Maccabi Tel Aviv	(Canada) Mitchell Goldhar	(Angola) Lito Vidigal	(Israel) Gal Alberman	Adidas	UNICEF

=== Foreign players ===
The number of foreign players is restricted to six per team, while only five can be registered to a game.

Club	Player 1	Player 2	Player 3	Player 4	Player 5	Player 6
Beitar Jerusalem	(Brazil) Claudemir	(France) Johan Audel	(France) Antoine Conte	(Germany) Marcel Heister	(Slovakia) **Erik Sabo**	(Spain) Jesús Rueda
Bnei Sakhnin	(Brazil) Georginho	(Brazil) Wanderson	(Ivory Coast) Lassina Dao	(Spain) Abraham Paz		
Bnei Yehuda	(Argentina) Pedro Galván	(Croatia) Antonio Mršić	(The Gambia) **Tijan Jaiteh**	(Lithuania) **Nerijus Valskis**	(Lithuania) **Emilijus Zubas**	(Serbia) Marko Jovanović
F.C. Ashdod	(Angola) **Dolly Menga**	(Austria) Sandro Gotal	(Croatia) Karlo Bručić	(Brazil) Lúcio Maranhão	(Brazil) Alan Wigor	(Russia) Georgi Batyayev
Hapoel Ashkelon	(Burkina Faso) Issoumaila Lingane	(Central African Republic) **David Manga**	(Croatia) Josip Ivančić	(Croatia) Mirko Oremuš	(Nigeria) **Dele Aiyenugba**	(Serbia) **Branislav Jovanović**
Hapoel Be'er Sheva	(Brazil) William Soares	(Hungary) **Mihály Korhut**	(Nigeria) Anthony Nwakaeme	(Nigeria) **John Ogu**	(Portugal) Miguel Vítor	(Romania) **Ovidiu Hoban**
Hapoel Haifa	(Brazil) Adilson Bahia	(Brazil) Júlio César	(Montenegro) Žarko Korać	(Netherlands) **Piet Velthuizen**	(Portugal) Bruno Pinheiro	
Hapoel Kfar Saba	(Brazil) Bruno Andrade	(Brazil) Diogo Kachuba	(Republic of the Congo) Mavis Tchibota	(Nigeria) Sunny Omoregie	(Serbia) Dušan Matović	(Serbia) Slobodan Simović
Hapoel Ra'anana	(Zambia) **Rodgers Kola**	(Zambia) **Conlyde Luchanga**	(Zambia) **Emmanuel Mbola**			
Hapoel Tel Aviv	(Chad) **Ezechiel N'Douassel**	(Jamaica) **Michael Seaton**	(Nigeria) John Chibuike			
Ironi Kiryat Shmona	(Brazil) Kassio	(Brazil) Mauricio	(Ivory Coast) Didier Brossou	(Nigeria) Jacob Njoku		
Maccabi Haifa	(Czech Republic) **Kamil Vacek**	(Iceland) **Hólmar Örn Eyjólfsson**	(Kosovo) **Enis Alushi**	(Norway) Fitim Azemi	(Spain) Marc Valiente	(Uruguay) Gary Kagelmacher
Maccabi Petah Tikva	(Brazil) Allyson	(Brazil) Romário	(Romania) Mihai Roman	(Serbia) Nenad Adamović	(Spain) Aitor	(Spain) Carlos Cuéllar
Maccabi Tel Aviv	(Argentina) Óscar Scarione	(Brazil) Marcelo	(Brazil) Ramon	(Iceland) **Viðar Örn Kjartansson**	(Portugal) **Rúben Micael**	(Serbia) **Predrag Rajković**

In bold: Players that have been capped for their national team. All Hapoel Tel Aviv foreign players were released due to budget cuts.

=== Managerial changes ===
Team	Outgoing manager	Manner of departure	Date of vacancy	Position in table	Incoming manager	Date of appointment
Ironi Kiryat Shmona	(Israel) Shlomi Dora	End of contract	16 May 2016	Pre-season	(Israel) Motti Ivanir	18 May 2016
Bnei Yehuda	(Israel) Yossi Mizrahi	End of contract	16 May 2016	Pre-season	(Israel) Arik Benado	24 May 2016
Maccabi Petah Tikva	(Israel) Dani Golan	End of contract	16 May 2016	Pre-season	(Israel) Kobi Refua	31 May 2016
Maccabi Tel Aviv	(Netherlands) Peter Bosz	Signed by Ajax	24 May 2016	Pre-season	(Georgia (country)) Shota Arveladze	16 June 2016
Beitar Jerusalem	(Israel) Slobodan Drapić	End of contract	1 June 2016	Pre-season	(Israel) Ran Ben Shimon	4 June 2016
Maccabi Haifa	(Israel) Ronny Levy	Sacked	27 July 2016	Pre-season	(Netherlands) René Meulensteen	9 August 2016
Hapoel Tel Aviv	(Israel) Eli Guttman	Became a sports director	20 September 2016	12th	(Israel) Guy Luzon	20 September 2016
Bnei Yehuda	(Israel) Arik Benado	Sacked	24 October 2016	13th	(Israel) Nissan Yehezkel	24 October 2016
Hapoel Haifa	(Israel) Eli Cohen	Sacked	11 December 2016	11th	(Israel) Dani Golan	11 December 2016
Maccabi Tel Aviv	(Georgia (country)) Shota Arveladze	Sacked	2 January 2017	2nd	(Angola) Lito Vidigal	11 February 2017
Hapoel Tel Aviv	(Israel) Guy Luzon	Resign	11 January 2017	14th	(Israel) Meni Koretski	11 January 2017
Hapoel Kfar Saba	(Israel) Sharon Mimer	Sacked	23 January 2017	12th	(Israel) Eli Cohen	25 January 2017
Maccabi Haifa	(Netherlands) René Meulensteen	Sacked	13 February 2017	7th	(Israel) Guy Luzon	13 February 2017
Beitar Jerusalem	(Israel) Ran Ben Shimon	Sacked	5 February 2017	5th	(Israel) Sharon Mimer	6 February 2017
F.C. Ashdod	(Israel) Ronny Awat	Became assistant coach	14 February 2017	10th	(Israel) Ran Ben Shimon	14 February 2017

== Regular season ==
=== Regular season table ===
Pos	Team	Pld	W	D	L	GF	GA	GD	Pts	Qualification or relegation
1	Hapoel Be'er Sheva	26	18	5	3	54	13	+41	59	Qualification for the Championship round
2	Maccabi Tel Aviv	26	17	5	4	45	19	+26	56	Qualification for the Championship round
3	Maccabi Petah Tikva	26	13	9	4	36	23	+13	48	Qualification for the Championship round
4	Beitar Jerusalem	26	10	10	6	34	27	+7	40	Qualification for the Championship round
5	Bnei Sakhnin	26	10	9	7	26	26	0	39	Qualification for the Championship round
6	Maccabi Haifa	26	10	8	8	30	25	+5	38	Qualification for the Championship round
7	Ironi Kiryat Shmona	26	9	8	9	35	33	+2	35	Qualification for the Relegation round
8	Hapoel Haifa	26	8	4	14	29	36	−7	28	Qualification for the Relegation round
9	F.C. Ashdod	26	6	10	10	15	26	−11	28	Qualification for the Relegation round
10	Hapoel Ra'anana	26	7	7	12	14	29	−15	28	Qualification for the Relegation round
11	Bnei Yehuda	26	5	10	11	20	32	−12	25	Qualification for the Relegation round
12	Hapoel Kfar Saba	26	4	9	13	17	34	−17	21	Qualification for the Relegation round
13	Hapoel Ashkelon	26	3	9	14	15	39	−24	18	Qualification for the Relegation round
14	Hapoel Tel Aviv (Note: Hapoel Tel Aviv were deducted nine points for entering administration.)	26	5	11	10	18	26	−8	17	Qualification for the Relegation round

Source: Israel Football Association, Soccerway
Rules for classification: 1) Points; 2) Goal difference; 3) Matches won; 4) Goals scored; 5) Head-to-head points; 6) Head-to-head goal difference; 7) Head-to-head goals scored; 8) Play-off.

=== Regular season results ===
Home \ Away	ASH	BEI	BnS	BnY	HAS	HBS	HHA	HKS	HRA	HTA	IKS	MHA	MPT	MTA
F.C. Ashdod	—	0–0	1–1	2–2	1–0	0–1	1–3	0–0	0–1	1–0	0–0	1–1	2–2	1–2
Beitar Jerusalem	1–1	—	0–1	2–2	3–0	1–3	1–0	1–0	1–0	1–1	2–2	0–1	1–1	1–0
Bnei Sakhnin	0–1	0–2	—	1–1	1–0	0–0	2–1	1–0	1–1	0–0	5–2	1–0	0–1	0–3
Bnei Yehuda	2–0	1–1	1–1	—	0–0	0–3	1–1	1–1	0–2	0–1	0–1	1–1	1–4	1–0
Hapoel Ashkelon	0–0	1–1	0–1	1–0	—	1–5	3–2	0–0	0–0	0–1	1–1	0–2	0–1	1–2
Hapoel Be'er Sheva	5–0	2–1	3–0	2–1	2–1	—	5–1	3–0	2–1	1–1	2–0	2–0	5–0	2–0
Hapoel Haifa	0–1	4–0	0–1	1–0	3–1	0–0	—	1–2	1–0	0–2	1–2	0–0	2–1	2–4
Hapoel Kfar Saba	1–0	0–2	2–1	0–1	1–1	0–2	1–2	—	1–2	0–0	2–2	0–2	1–3	1–1
Hapoel Ra'anana	0–0	0–4	0–1	1–0	0–2	1–0	2–0	1–0	—	0–0	0–3	1–1	0–1	0–3
Hapoel Tel Aviv	2–0	1–2	1–1	1–2	2–0	0–0	0–0	1–1	0–0	—	3–3	0–2	0–1	0–1
Ironi Kiryat Shmona	1–0	2–0	2–2	0–1	4–1	0–2	2–0	1–2	0–0	2–1	—	3–0	0–1	1–2
Maccabi Haifa	0–1	0–2	1–2	1–1	5–0	2–1	0–3	2–0	2–0	1–0	0–0	—	0–2	2–2
Maccabi Petah Tikva	0–1	2–2	1–1	2–0	1–1	1–1	3–1	0–0	2–0	2–0	2–1	2–2	—	0–1
Maccabi Tel Aviv	1–0	2–2	2–1	2–0	0–0	1–0	1–0	3–1	4–1	5–0	3–0	0–2	0–0	—

Source: Israel Football Association
Legend: Blue = home team win; Yellow = draw; Red = away team win.
For upcoming matches, an "a" indicates there is an article about the rivalry between the two participants.

== Championship round ==
Key numbers for pairing determination (number marks position after 26 games)

Rounds
27th	28th	29th	30th	31st	32nd	33rd	34th	35th	36th
1 – 6; 2 – 5; 3 – 4	1 – 2; 5 – 3; 6 – 4	2 – 6; 3 – 1; 4 – 5	1 – 4; 2 – 3; 6 – 5	3 – 6; 4 – 2; 5 – 1	6 – 1; 5 – 2; 4 – 3	2 – 1; 3 – 5; 4 – 6	6 – 2; 1 – 3; 5 – 4	3 – 2; 4 – 1; 5 – 6	6 – 3; 2 – 4; 1 – 5

=== Championship round table ===
Pos	Team	Pld	W	D	L	GF	GA	GD	Pts	Qualification
1	Hapoel Be'er Sheva (C, Q)	36	26	7	3	73	18	+55	85	Qualification for the Champions League second qualifying round
2	Maccabi Tel Aviv (Q)	36	22	6	8	61	28	+33	72	Qualification for the Europa League first qualifying round
3	Beitar Jerusalem (Q)	36	16	12	8	53	36	+17	60	Qualification for the Europa League first qualifying round
4	Maccabi Petah Tikva	36	15	11	10	42	34	+8	56	
5	Bnei Sakhnin	36	13	9	14	32	46	−14	48	
6	Maccabi Haifa	36	12	9	15	34	41	−7	45	

Source: Israel Football Association, Soccerway
Rules for classification: 1) Points; 2) Goal difference; 3) Matches won; 4) Goals scored; 5) Head-to-head points; 6) Head-to-head goal difference; 7) Head-to-head goals scored; 8) Play-off.
(C) Champions; (Q) Qualified for the phase indicated

2016–17 Israeli Premier League champions

Hapoel Be'er Sheva
4th title

=== Championship round results ===
Home \ Away	BEI	BnS	HBS	MHA	MPT	MTA
Beitar Jerusalem	—	3–0	1–1	2–0	2–1	1–1
Bnei Sakhnin	1–5	—	1–3	1–0	1–0	1–3
Hapoel Be'er Sheva	2–0	2–0	—	4–0	1–1	1–0
Maccabi Haifa	3–2	0–1	0–1	—	0–0	0–2
Maccabi Petah Tikva	0–1	1–0	1–2	0–1	—	2–1
Maccabi Tel Aviv	0–2	3–0	1–2	3–0	2–0	—

Source: Israel Football Association
Legend: Blue = home team win; Yellow = draw; Red = away team win.

== Relegation round ==
Key numbers for pairing determination (number marks position after 26 games)

Rounds
27th	28th	29th	30th	31st	32nd	33rd
7 – 14; 8 – 13; 9 – 12; 10 – 11	7 – 8; 13 – 9; 12 – 10; 14 – 11	8 – 14; 9 – 7; 10 – 13; 11 – 12	8 – 9; 7 – 10; 13 – 11; 14 – 12	9 – 14; 10 – 8; 11 – 7; 12 – 13	9 – 10; 8 – 11; 7 – 12; 14 – 13	10 – 14; 11 – 9; 12 – 8; 13 – 7

=== Relegation round table ===
Pos	Team	Pld	W	D	L	GF	GA	GD	Pts	Relegation
7	Ironi Kiryat Shmona	33	10	9	14	44	48	−4	39	
8	Hapoel Haifa	33	10	7	16	39	46	−7	37	
9	F.C. Ashdod	33	7	15	11	22	32	−10	36	
10	Hapoel Ra'anana	33	9	9	15	22	40	−18	36	
11	Bnei Yehuda (Q)	33	8	11	14	26	39	−13	35	Qualification for the Europa League second qualifying round (Note: Bnei Yehuda qualified for the Europa League Second qualifying round by winning the 2016–17 Israel State Cup)
12	Hapoel Ashkelon	33	7	11	15	24	42	−18	32	
13	Hapoel Kfar Saba (R)	33	7	10	16	23	40	−17	31	Relegation to Liga Leumit
14	Hapoel Tel Aviv (Note: Hapoel Tel Aviv were deducted nine points for entering administration.) (R)	33	8	14	11	29	34	−5	29	Relegation to Liga Leumit

Source: Israel Football Association, Soccerway
Rules for classification: 1) Points; 2) Goal difference; 3) Matches won; 4) Goals scored; 5) Head-to-head points; 6) Head-to-head goal difference; 7) Head-to-head goals scored; 8) Play-off.
(Q) Qualified for the phase indicated; (R) Relegated

=== Relegation round results ===
Home \ Away	ASH	BnY	HAS	HHA	HKS	HRA	HTA	IKS
F.C. Ashdod	—	—	—	—	0–0	2–2	2–0	1–1
Bnei Yehuda	2–1	—	—	—	1–0	—	—	0–2
Hapoel Ashkelon	0–0	1–0	—	—	—	—	—	2–1
Hapoel Haifa	1–1	1–1	1–4	—	—	—	3–3	—
Hapoel Kfar Saba	—	—	1–0	1–0	—	0–2	—	—
Hapoel Ra'anana	—	0–2	0–2	0–2	—	—	1–1	—
Hapoel Tel Aviv	—	2–0	0–0	—	2–0	—	—	—
Ironi Kiryat Shmona	—	—	—	0–2	1–4	2–3	2–3	—

Source: Israel Football Association
Legend: Blue = home team win; Yellow = draw; Red = away team win.

== Positions by round ==
The table lists the positions of teams after each week of matches. Note that Championship round teams will play in 36 matchdays, and the Relegation round teams will compete in only 33 matches.

Team \ Round	1	2	3	4	5	6	7	8	9	10	11	12	13	14	15	16	17	18	19	20	21	22	23	24	25	26	27	28	29	30	31	32	33	34	35	36
Hapoel Be'er Sheva	3	6	1	3	3	2	1	1	1	1	1	1	1	1	1	1	1	1	1	1	1	1	1	1	1	1	1	1	1	1	1	1	1	1	1	1
Maccabi Tel Aviv	1	1	2	1	1	1	2	3	3	2	2	2	2	2	2	2	2	2	2	2	2	2	2	2	2	2	2	2	2	2	2	2	2	2	2	2
Beitar Jerusalem	6	9	9	5	8	6	5	5	5	5	5	5	6	6	7	6	6	5	5	5	5	4	4	4	4	4	4	4	4	4	4	3	3	3	3	3
Maccabi Petah Tikva	7	4	3	2	2	3	3	2	2	4	4	4	4	4	3	3	3	3	3	3	3	3	3	3	3	3	3	3	3	3	3	4	4	4	4	4
Bnei Sakhnin	8	5	8	11	11	13	10	6	8	9	7	7	7	8	6	7	7	7	7	6	6	5	5	5	5	5	5	5	5	5	5	5	5	5	5	5
Maccabi Haifa	5	8	6	4	5	5	4	4	4	3	3	3	3	3	4	4	5	6	6	7	7	7	6	7	7	6	6	6	6	6	6	6	6	6	6	6
Ironi Kiryat Shmona	4	3	5	7	6	7	7	10	6	7	6	6	5	5	5	5	4	4	4	4	4	6	7	6	6	7	7	7	7	7	7	7	7			
Hapoel Haifa	10	7	10	6	4	4	6	7	9	11	9	10	11	9	9	8	8	8	8	8	8	8	8	8	8	8	9	8	8	9	8	8	8			
F.C. Ashdod	12	14	13	13	14	14	14	14	12	10	10	12	12	12	12	10	9	9	9	9	10	11	10	10	10	9	8	10	10	10	9	9	9			
Hapoel Ra'anana	11	13	12	14	12	11	8	8	10	6	8	8	8	7	8	9	9	10	10	10	9	9	9	9	9	10	11	9	11	8	10	10	10			
Bnei Yehuda	9	10	11	8	10	9	13	12	13	13	13	13	14	13	13	12	12	13	11	11	11	10	11	11	11	11	10	11	9	11	11	11	11			
Hapoel Ashkelon	2	2	4	9	9	10	12	13	14	14	14	14	13	14	14	13	13	12	13	13	13	13	13	13	13	13	13	14	12	12	12	12	12			
Hapoel Kfar Saba	14	12	7	10	7	8	11	11	7	8	12	11	10	11	11	11	11	11	12	12	12	12	12	12	12	12	12	13	14	14	14	14	13			
Hapoel Tel Aviv	13	11	14	12	13	12	9	9	11	12	11	9	9	10	10	14	14	14	14	14	14	14	14	14	14	14	14	12	13	13	13	13	14			

2017–18 UEFA Champions League Second qualifying round
2017–18 UEFA Europa League First qualifying round
Relegation to 2017–18 Liga Leumit

== Season statistics ==
=== Top scorers ===
As of 20 May 2017

Rank	Scorer	Club	Goals
1	(Iceland) Viðar Örn Kjartansson	Maccabi Tel Aviv	19
2	(Israel) Tal Ben Haim	Maccabi Tel Aviv	15
3	(Nigeria) Anthony Nwakaeme	Hapoel Be'er Sheva	14
3	(Israel) Ben Sahar	Hapoel Be'er Sheva	14
3	(Israel) Itay Shechter	Beitar Jerusalem	14
6	(Israel) Idan Vered	Beitar Jerusalem	11
7	(Israel) Gidi Kanyuk	Maccabi Petah Tikva	10
7	(Israel) Eli Elbaz	Hapoel Kfar Saba	10
9	(Israel) Mahran Lala	Hapoel Haifa	9
9	(Israel) Guy Melamed	Maccabi Petah Tikva	9

=== Hat-tricks ===
Player	For	Against	Result	Date	Ref
(Burkina Faso) Issoumaila Lingane	Hapoel Ashkelon	Hapoel Haifa	3–2	20 August 2016	
(Israel) Yuval Avidor	Bnei Sakhnin	Ironi Kiryat Shmona	5–2	16 January 2017	
(Iceland) Viðar Örn Kjartansson	Maccabi Tel Aviv	Ironi Kiryat Shmona	3–0	18 February 2017	

== Attendances ==
Maccabi Haifa drew the highest average home attendance in the 2016-17 edition of the Israeli top-flight football league.

#	Football club	Home games	Average attendance
1	Maccabi Haifa FC	13	21,891
2	Hapoel Be'er Sheva FC	13	14,467
3	Maccabi Tel Aviv FC	13	9,529
4	Beitar Jerusalem FC	13	8,192
5	Hapoel Tel Aviv FC	13	7,900
6	Hapoel Haifa FC	13	5,133
7	Hapoel Petah Tikva FC	13	3,450
8	Bnei Yehuda Tel Aviv F.C.	13	3,312
9	Bnei Sakhnin FC	13	3,231
10	Hapoel Ashkelon F.C.	13	2,785
11	FC Ashdod	13	2,462
12	Hapoel Kfar Saba F.C.	13	2,302
13	Hapoel Ra'anana	13	1,713
14	Ironi Kiryat Shmona	13	1,492
