= 2016–17 Bnei Sakhnin F.C. season =

Bnei Sakhnin F.C.
2016–17 season
- Chairman: Muhammed Abu Younes
- Manager: Yossi Abuksis
- Israeli Premier League: 5th
- State Cup: Round of 16
- Toto Cup: Group stage
- Top goalscorer: League: Yuval Avidor (7); All: Yuval Avidor (9)
Home colours	Away colours	Third colours

The 2016–17 Bnei Sakhnin season was the club's 27th season since its establishment in 1991, and 10th straight season in the Israeli Premier League since promoting from Liga Leumit in 2006–07.

During the 2016–17 campaign the club have competed in the Israeli Premier League, State Cup, Toto Cup.

== Match results ==
=== Legend ===
Win	Draw	Loss

=== League ===
Pos	Team	Pld	W	D	L	GF	GA	GD	Pts	Qualification or relegation
3	Maccabi Petah Tikva	26	13	9	4	36	23	+13	48	Qualification for the Championship round
4	Beitar Jerusalem	26	10	10	6	34	27	+7	40	Qualification for the Championship round
5	Bnei Sakhnin	26	10	9	7	26	26	0	39	Qualification for the Championship round
6	Maccabi Haifa	26	10	8	8	30	25	+5	38	Qualification for the Championship round
7	Ironi Kiryat Shmona	26	9	8	9	35	33	+2	35	Qualification for the Relegation round

Source: Israel Football Association, Soccerway

Pos	Team	Pld	W	D	L	GF	GA	GD	Pts	Qualification
1	Hapoel Be'er Sheva (C, Q)	36	26	7	3	73	18	+55	85	Qualification for the Champions League second qualifying round
2	Maccabi Tel Aviv (Q)	36	22	6	8	61	28	+33	72	Qualification for the Europa League first qualifying round
3	Beitar Jerusalem (Q)	36	16	12	8	53	36	+17	60	Qualification for the Europa League first qualifying round
4	Maccabi Petah Tikva	36	15	11	10	42	34	+8	56	
5	Bnei Sakhnin	36	13	9	14	32	46	−14	48	
6	Maccabi Haifa	36	12	9	15	34	41	−7	45	

Source: Israel Football Association, Soccerway
(C) Champions; (Q) Qualified for the phase indicated

Date	Opponent	Venue	Result	Scorers	Position
20 August 2016 - 18:00	Bnei Yehuda	Away	1–1	Georginho	8
27 August 2016 - 20:10	Maccabi Haifa	Home	1–0	Georginho	5
10 September 2016 - 20:15	Hapoel Be'er Sheva	Away	0–3		8
18 September 2016 - 19:00	Maccabi Petah Tikva	Home	0–1		11
21 September 2016 - 21:00	Maccabi Tel Aviv	Home	0–3		11
24 September 2016 - 18:00	Hapoel Kiryat Shmona	Away	2–2	Idan Shemesh, Georginho	13
22 October 2016 - 20:15	Hapoel Ashkelon	Away	1–0	Yuval Avidor	10
29 October 2016 - 16:00	Hapoel Haifa	Home	2–1	Yuval Avidor, Jude Nworuh	6
7 November 2016 - 21:00	Hapoel Kfar Saba	Away	1–2	Ramzi Safouri	8
19 November 2016 - 16:00	F.C. Ironi Ashdod	Home	0–1		9
28 November 2016 - 21:00	Beitar Jerusalem	Away	1–0	Ramzi Safouri	7
4 December 2016 - 19:00	Hapoel Ra'anana	Home	1–1	Abraham Paz	7
10 December 2016 - 16:00	Hapoel Tel Aviv	Away	1–1	Abraham Paz	7
17 December 2016 - 18:15	Bnei Yehuda	Home	1–1	Abraham Paz	8
26 December 2016 - 20:30	Maccabi Haifa	Away	2–1	Ramzi Safouri, Georginho	6
1 January 2017 - 20:15	Hapoel Be'er Sheva	Away	0–0		7
10 January 2017 - 19:00	Maccabi Petah Tikva	Away	1–1	Abraham Paz	7
16 January 2017 - 18:30	Hapoel Kiryat Shmona	Home	5–2	Yuval Avidor (3), Ali Ottman, Abraham Paz	7
22 January 2017 - 21:00	Maccabi Tel Aviv	Away	1–2	Georginho	7
29 January 2017 - 19:00	Hapoel Ashkelon	Home	1–0	Idan Shemesh	6
4 February 2017 - 18:00	Hapoel Haifa	Away	1–0	Idan Shemesh	6
12 February 2017 - 19:00	Hapoel Kfar Saba	Home	1–0	Idan Shemesh	5
18 February 2017 - 18:15	F.C. Ironi Ashdod	Away	1–1	Idan Shemesh	5
26 February 2017 - 21:00	Beitar Jerusalem	Home	0–2		5
4 March 2017 - 18:00	Hapoel Ra'anana	Away	1–0	Firas Mugrabi	5
11 March 2017 - 20:30	Hapoel Tel Aviv	Home	0–0		5
18 March 2017 - 18:15	Maccabi Tel Aviv	Away	0–3		5
2 April 2017 - 19:00	Maccabi Petah Tikva	Home	1–0	Nir Lax	5
8 April 2017 - 20:30	Beitar Jerusalem	Away	0–3		5
15 April 2017 - 18:00	Maccabi Haifa	Away	1–0	Yuval Avidor	5
22 April 2017 - 20:15	Hapoel Be'er Sheva	Home	1–3	Yuval Avidor	5
25 April 2017 - 19:45	Maccabi Tel Aviv	Home	1–3	Ali Ottman	5
29 April 2017 - 18:00	Maccabi Petah Tikva	Away	0–1		5
6 May 2017 - 20:30	Beitar Jerusalem	Home	1–5	Idan Shemesh	5
13 May 2017 - 18:00	Maccabi Haifa	Home	1–0	Firas Mugrabi	5
20 May 2017 - 19:00	Hapoel Be'er Sheva	Away	0–2		5

=== State Cup ===
Date	Round	Opponent	Venue	Result	Scorers
5 January 2017 - 19:35	8th round	Maccabi Sha'arayim	Away	3–1	Siraj Nassar (2), Yuval Avidor
25 January 2017 - 21:00	Round of 16	Beitar Jerusalem	Away	1–2	Idan Shemesh

=== Toto Cup ===
Pos	Team	Pld	W	D	L	GF	GA	GD	Pts	Qualification or relegation
1	Maccabi Haifa	4	3	1	0	6	3	+3	10	Qualified to Quarter-finals
2	Hapoel Haifa	4	1	2	1	5	4	+1	5	Qualified to Quarter-finals
3	Hapoel Kiryat Shmona	4	0	4	0	2	2	0	4	Qualified to Quarter-finals
4	Bnei Sakhnin	4	0	3	1	4	5	−1	3	
5	Hapoel Kfar Saba	4	0	2	2	2	5	−3	2	

Updated to match(es) played on 16 August 2016. Source: Israel Football Association
Rules for classification: 1) points; 2) goal difference; 3) number of wins; 4) goals scored; 5) head to head; 6)deciding match.

Date	Round	Opponent	Venue	Result	Scorers
31 July 2016 - 19:00	Group	Hapoel Haifa	Away	2–2	Ramzi Safouri, Yuval Avidor
2 August 2016 - 20:15	Group	Hapoel Kiryat Shmona	Home	1–1	Tita Weslei
6 August 2016 - 21:00	Group	Maccabi Haifa	Away	1–2	Ramzi Safouri
16 August 2016 - 19:15	Group	Hapoel Kfar Saba	Home	0–0	

== Player details ==
List of squad players, including number of appearances by competition

No.	Pos	Nat	Player	Total		Premier League		State Cup		Toto Cup	
No.	Pos	Nat	Player	Apps	Goals	Apps	Goals	Apps	Goals	Apps	Goals
1	GK	(Israel) ISR	Assaf Raz	3	0	3	0	0	0	0	0
22	GK	(Israel) ISR	Mahmmoud Kanadil	39	0	33	0	2	0	4	0
2	DF	(Israel) ISR	Maron Ghantus	13	0	12	0	1	0	0	0
4	DF	(Israel) ISR	Sari Falah	38	0	33	0	1	0	4	0
5	DF	(Spain) ESP	Abraham Paz	34	5	29	5	2	0	3	0
7	DF	(Israel) ISR	Muhammed Zbidat	25	0	19	0	2	0	4	0
8	DF	(Israel) ISR	Oleksandr Zhdanov	1	0	0	0	0	0	1	0
12	DF	(United States) USA	Jason Gorskie	3	0	0	0	0	0	3	0
13	DF	(Israel) ISR	Ihab Shami	6	0	4	0	0	0	2	0
18	DF	(Israel) ISR	Ali Ottman	33	2	28	2	2	0	3	0
25	DF	(Brazil) BRA	Wanderson	42	0	36	0	2	0	4	0
88	DF	(Brazil) BRA	Ricardo Lucena	1	0	0	0	0	0	1	0
99	FW	(Israel) ISR	Osama Khalaila	2	0	2	0	0	0	0	0
6	MF	(Israel) ISR	Tambi Sagas	40	0	34	0	2	0	4	0
8	MF	(Israel) ISR	Uday Shalata	1	0	0	0	0	0	1	0
12	MF	(Israel) ISR	Nir Lax	26	1	25	1	1	0	0	0
14	MF	(Israel) ISR	Ihab Ghnaim	8	0	5	0	0	0	3	0
15	MF	(Israel) ISR	Khaled Khalaila	30	0	26	0	2	0	2	0
23	MF	(Brazil) BRA	Tita Weslei	2	1	0	0	0	0	2	1
23	MF	(Israel) ISR	Ataa Jaber	6	0	6	0	0	0	0	0
26	MF	(Israel) ISR	Firas Mugrabi	21	2	20	2	1	0	0	0
27	MF	(Brazil) BRA	Rodrigo António	15	0	14	0	0	0	1	0
31	MF	(Israel) ISR	Ahmad Subeih	1	0	1	0	0	0	0	0
77	MF	(Israel) ISR	Siraj Nassar	33	2	29	0	1	2	3	0
9	FW	(Nigeria) NGA	Jude Nworuh	13	1	12	1	0	0	1	0
9	FW	(Ivory Coast) CIV	Lassina Dao	5	0	5	0	0	0	0	0
10	FW	(Israel) ISR	Ramzi Safouri	35	5	32	3	1	0	2	2
11	FW	(Israel) ISR	Yuval Avidor	42	9	36	7	2	1	4	1
13	FW	(Brazil) BRA	Anderson Lessa	3	0	0	0	0	0	3	0
17	FW	(Israel) ISR	Fadi Zidan	1	0	0	0	0	0	1	0
23	FW	(Israel) ISR	Mohammed Badrana	7	0	3	0	2	0	2	0
24	FW	(Israel) ISR	Idan Shemesh	27	7	25	6	2	1	0	0
52	FW	(Brazil) BRA	Georginho	34	5	29	5	2	0	3	0

== Transfers ==
=== In ===
No.	Pos.	Nation	Player
—	GK	ISR	Assaf Raz (from (Israel) F.C. Kafr Qasim)
—	DF	ISR	Sari Falah (from (Israel) Bnei Yehuda)
—	DF	ISR	Jason Gorskie (from (Malta) Pietà Hotspurs)
—	MF	ISR	Siraj Nassar (from (Israel) Hapoel Tel Aviv)
—	MF	ISR	Ramzi Safouri (on loan from (Israel) Hapoel Tel Aviv)
—	MF	BRA	Rodrigo António (from (Portugal) Paços de Ferreira)
—	MF	ISR	Nir Lax (on loan from (Israel) Hapoel Tel Aviv)
—	FW	NGA	Jude Nworuh (from (Israel) Bnei Yehuda)
—	FW	ISR	Idan Shemesh (from (Israel) Maccabi Petah Tikva)
—	MF	ISR	Firas Mugrabi (from (Israel) Maccabi Haifa)
—	MF	ISR	Ataa Jaber (from (Israel) Maccabi Haifa)
—	FW	CIV	Lassina Dao (from (Israel) Hapoel Ashkelon)

=== Out ===
No.	Pos.	Nation	Player
—	GK	ISR	Ran Kadoch (to (Israel) Hapoel Kfar Saba)
—	DF	ISR	Itzik Cohen (to (Israel) Hapoel Kfar Saba)
—	DF	PLE	Ala'a Abu Saleh (to (Palestine) Shabab Al-Khalil)
—	DF	ISR	Shadi Khatib (to (Israel) F.C. Tzeirei Kafr Kanna)
—	DF	PLE	Muamen Agbaria (to (Palestine) Shabab Al-Khalil)
—	MF	ISR	Firas Mugrabi (to (Israel) Maccabi Haifa)
—	MF	BRA	Diogo Kachuba (to (Israel) Hapoel Kfar Saba)
—	MF	ISR	Hamad Ganayem (to (Palestine) Shabab Al-Khalil)
—	FW	ISR	Weaam Amasha (to (Israel) Hapoel Tel Aviv)
—	FW	ISR	Shlomi Azulay (to (Israel) Hapoel Ironi Kiryat Shmona)
—	MF	BRA	Rodrigo António (to (Kazakhstan) Irtysh)
—	FW	ISR	Amir Khalaila (to (Israel) Hapoel Be'er Sheva)
—	FW	ISR	Mohammed Badrana (on loan to (Israel) Hapoel Rishon LeZion)

== See also ==
- List of Bnei Sakhnin F.C. seasons
