= Júlio César Zabotto =

Brazilian footballer

Personal information
- Date of birth: 16 February 1983 (age 43)
- Place of birth: Campinas, Brazil
- Height: 1.83 m (6 ft 0 in)
- Position: Midfielder

Team information
- Current team: Volta Redonda

Senior career*
Years	Team	Apps	(Gls)
2003–2006	Palmeiras		
2006	Ettifaq		
2007–2008	Grêmio Barueri		
2009	Atlético Sorocaba	0	(0)
2010	Juventude	0	(0)
2010	Red Bull Brasil	0	(0)
2011	Treze	0	(0)
2011	Americana	5	(0)
2012–	Volta Redonda		
- * Club domestic league appearances and goals as of 22 January 2012

Júlio César Zabotto (born 16 February 1983), sometimes known as just Júlio César, is a Brazilian footballer.

== Biography ==
=== Palmeiras ===
Júlio César started his professional career at Palmeiras. In August 2005 he signed a new 1-year contract with club.

=== Barueri ===
After the contract with Palmeiras was expired on 30 June 2006, he left for Saudi Arabian club Ettifaq. He also signed a contract with Grêmio Barueri on 20 September and formally became a player of Barueri on 11 January 2007. That day CBF ratified his contract and published in the BID-E bulletin. He played 9 games in 2007 Campeonato Brasileiro Série B. He was offered a new 1-year contract in December 2007. However, he was released in June 2008. Júlio César scored a goal in his first game of 2008 Campeonato Paulista. He played 7 games in the state league in 2008 season.

=== Sorocaba ===
In January 2009 he was signed by Atlético Sorocaba, where he met his namesake Júlio César Teixeira, but known as Julinho. Zabotto made his club debut in 2009 Campeonato Paulista Série A2 on 4 February. He also played the next round (round 4), round 6 to 8, total 5 games. In mid-season the club signed another namesake Júlio César Bastos de Lima Ferreira. Zabotto did not play any game in 2009 Copa Paulista.

=== Juventude & Red Bull ===
In November 2009 his contract was extended to March 2010 but on 16 February transferred to Juventude, after no appearance in the state league. In Juventude he met his namesake Júlio César Muniz, but both players did not play any game in 2010 Campeonato Gaúcho since March, when Zabotto formally available to play for the club. He was released again in April. In August he was signed by Red Bull Brasil for 2010 Copa Paulista. Zabotto made his club debut on 29 August, round 9. He also played the next 3 matches (round 10 to 12). He was replaced by Rogisvaldo João dos Santos in the seventh minute in round 12. He returned to the field on 29 September, round 16 (round 2 of second stage). In total he played 11 games in the state cup (4+3+4 in 3 stages of the cup), which he also played in the last two rounds (round 19 and 20; or round 5 & 6 of second stage) of group stage. He played full 90 minute in the latter game. In the knock-out stage, he played 4 matches and finished as the losing finalists to Paulista.

=== Treze & Americana ===
Júlio César played for Treze in 2011 Campeonato Paraibano. In July he left for Americana, rejoining namesake Júlio César Muniz and Luiz Felipe, both former Juventude teammate. He was the third "Júlio César" of the team in 2011 season, which Júlio César Coimbra left the club in May. He only played five times (all as sub) for the club in the second division, the first four matches Zabotto did not play along with Muniz on the field, but on the bench three times (27 September and the last two rounds). He made his club debut on 6 August (which Muniz was replaced in the first half of the match) and also played in the next round. Zabotto waited 3 months to play his third match on 8 November. The two Júlio César finally played together in round 38 (last round) on 26 November. He also replaced Airton at half time in round 37.

== Honours ==
- Campeonato Paraibano: 2011
