= Marco Morgon =

Brazilian footballer (born 1988)

Personal information
- Full name: Marco Antonio Morgon Filho
- Date of birth: 24 February 1988 (age 38)
- Place of birth: Santo André, Brazil
- Height: 5 ft 8 in (1.73 m)
- Positions: Attacking midfielder; left winger

Team information
- Current team: Manurewa
- Number: 11

Youth career
- 2000–2004: Corinthians
- 2004: Noroeste
- 2004: Nacional-MG
- 2007: Mogi das Cruzes
- 2007–2008: América Mineiro

Senior career*
Years	Team	Apps	(Gls)
2008	Bandeirante		
2008–2009	Atlétio de Valdevez		
2009–2010	Coruxo		
2010–2011	Céltiga		
2011–2012	Deportivo San Pedro		(14)
2012-2013	Deportivo Mictlán	17	(2)
2013	Cobán Imperial		
2013	Deportivo San Pedro		
2014	San Marcos de Arica		
2015	Alianza Petrolera	4	(0)
2016	Huehueteco		
2017	Colorado		
2017	Brasília		(2)
2017	Desportiva Ferroviária	6	(0)
2017	Hibernians	5	(1)
2018	Ghajnsielem		(14)
2018–2019	Sirens	23	(11)
2018–2019	San José	27	(8)
2019–2020	Bylis Ballsh	4	(0)
2021	Gran Mamoré		
2021–2022	Sololá	10	(1)
2022–2022	Manurewa	5	(1)
2022–2022	Santa Maria	N/A	(N/A)
- * Club domestic league appearances and goals

Marco Antonio Morgon Filho (born 24 February 1988), known as Marquinho, is a Brazilian professional footballer who plays as a midfielder for Santa Maria.

== Career ==
Marco Morgon started his career in the lower categories of Corinthians, where he played for five years. After that, he had a chance to show his work in América Futebol Clube, becoming the top scorer in the Junior Tournament. In 2007, he was ceded to Boa Esporte (known as VEC at the time), where he debuted as a professional and emerged as a great promise.

In 2008, the athlete played for Atlétio de Valdevez, 2B Division. Then, joined G.D. Moreira do Lima, a Portuguese Third Division team, becoming a scorer.

In 2010, Morgon played for Coruxo F.C., a Spanish 2B Division football club, playing for one season. After that, he was transferred to Céltiga F.C., making it into the 2nd Division.

In 2012, he signed for Deportivo San Pedro, finishing as a top scorer with 14 goals. This caught the eyes of National League teams, such as Comunicaciones and Municipal. Morgon signed, in 2013, for Deportivo Mictlán, in Asunción Mita. In the Guatemalan club, he had a successful tournament and was rated the Best Assist Maker in the league, with 10 assists.

In 2014, the footballer signed for San Marcos de Arica, which was the champion of the First Division B.

From 2015 until 2016, he played for Alianza Petrolera F.C. in Colombia.

In 2017, Morgon played for Brasília F.C., scoring 2 goals in a friendly match against Cruzeiro E.C., whose managers showed interest in signing Morgon.

Also in 2017, Morgon decided it was time for a change, signing for Desportiva Ferroviária, introducing himself to the supporters.

At the end of 2017, he played for the Premier League team Hibernians F.C. His skills impressed the First Division club Ghajnsielem F.C., which signed him for the 2017/2018 season. The footballer scored 11 goals in league matches and 3 during the Gozo Cups. In July 2018, First Division team Sirens F.C. signed Morgon, and the athlete helped the club to get promoted to the Maltese Premier League, scoring 11 goals and assisting in another 13.

In 2019, Morgon played as a midfielder for San José de Oruro. In 2020, when competing for the Copa Libertadores, Marco Morgon delivered a brilliant performance, according to the Bolivian Fox Sports commentators.

Morgon is growing in popularity in the Latin American country San José and, alongside his teammates, went back to the fields in November 2020.

The match against Real Santa Cruz was highly successful for the team after a long period of unlicensed training. Marco scored 2 goals, setting up the winning at 4-1.

In January 2021, Morgon signed for KF Bylis, an Albanian football club competing in the Kategoria Superiore in the Eastern European country.

After playing for Bylis, in Albania, Marco Morgon signed for Gran Mamoré in 2021/2, which is currently competing on the División de Fútbol Profesional in Bolivia.

At the end of 2021, Morgon signed with Sololá, competing on Guatemala’s Liga Nacional.

Morgon’s great performance caught the attention of Manurewa AFC, a football club based in Auckland, New Zealand. The player is now the number 11 of the team, playing as a left winger. In January 2023, Marco signed for Santa Maria, playing as a left-winger.

== Statistics ==
(Correct as of January 23, 2022)

Competition	Appearances	Goals	Assists	Y. Cards	R. Cards	Minutes Played
Liga Nacional Clausura	33	5	0	11	0	2352'
NRFL Division 1	5	1	N/A	0	0	N/A
Abissnet Superiore	8	0	0	1	0	233'
Bolivian Div. Prof. Apertura	25	8	1	1	1	1.933'
CONMEBOL Libertadores	2	0	0	1	0	128'
Challenge League	23	10	8	3	1	1.878'
Premier League	10	5	0	1	0	848'
Maltese FA Trophy	2	0	0	0	0	154'
Liga Dimayor I	7	3	0	0	0	627'

The Maltese First Division football club, Sirens F.C., had a good 18/19 season. They won 18 out of 26 matches. The Blues were declared champions of the BOV First Division after a goalless draw with Vittoriosa Stars F.C. on April 20. Their promotion to Premier League came earlier in April, and Marco Morgon used his Facebook to thank everyone involved in this historical moment, receiving tons of replies from the supporters and fans across Europe and Latin America.

(...) I would like to thank everyone from the club: the Coach, for believing in my work and for being with me in every moment, especially the hardest ones, and for making me become not just a better player, but a better person; to the President and the Committee, for fighting for me since day one and for making me feel important; my teammates, I have no words to describe what we are together and everything we did for each other. Thank you to each one of you for teaching me things about life every day, and a huge thanks to the Staff; a special thanks to Guzy, someone who was always there for us, behind the scenes, several times, in the morning, went to the Stadium just to open the door for me so I could train a bit more. You are a winner, an amazing human being, and a friend; Final but not least, an enormous thanks to our 12º player – the fans! Without your support, none of this would have been possible. You are one of the main reasons why we are where we are. Thank you! (...)

== Clubs ==
(Correct as of January 23, 2022)

Club	Country	Year
Varginha EC	Brazil	2007
C.A. Mogi Das Cruzes	Brazil	2007
Bandeirante EC	Brazil	2008
Atlético de Valdevez	Portugal	2008–2009
Coruxo F.C.	Spain	2009–2010
Céltiga F.C.	Spain	2010–2011
Deportivo San Pedro	Guatemala	2011–2012
Deportivo Mictlán	Guatemala	2012–2013
Cobán Imperial	Guatemala	2013
Deportivo San Pedro	Guatemala	2013
San Marcos de Arica	Chile	2014
Alianza Petrolera F.C.	Colombia	2015
Club Social y Deportivo Huehueteco	Guatemala	2016
Colorado E.C.	Brazil	2017
Brasília F.C.	Brazil	2017
Desportiva Ferroviária	Brazil	2017
Hibernians F.C.	Malta	2017
Ghajnsielem F.C.	Malta	2018
Sirens F.C.	Malta	2018–2019
San José de Oruro	Bolivia	2019-2021
KF Bylis	Albania	2021
Gran Mamoré FC	Bolivia	2021
CSD Sololá	Guatemala	2021–2022
Manurewa AFC	New Zealand	2022–Present

== Honours ==
Noroeste Bauru, São Paulo

- Champion at Campeonato Paulista do Interior in 2004 playing for Esporte Clube Noroeste

Mogi das Cruzes, São Paulo

- Champion at Campeonato Paulista Juniores in 2007 playing for União Futebol Clube

América, Minas Gerais

- Champion at Campeonato Mineiro Juvenil in 2008 playing for América Futebol Clube

Viana do Castelo, Portugal

- Top Scorer in 2008 playing for Atlético de Valdevez

Moreira do Lima, Portugal

- Viana do Castelo Honour Division in 2009 playing for GD Moreira de Lima

Moreira do Lima, Portugal

- Second-highest goal scorer in 2009 playing GD Moreira de Lima

Galicia, Spain

- Champion and promoted to 2nd League in 2010 playing for Céltiga FC

San Marcos, Guatemala

- Top Scorer in 2012 playing for Deportivo San Pedro

Arica, Chile

- Chilean First B Division Champion and promoted to Premier League in 2014 playing for San Marcos de Arica

San Pawl il-Baħar, Malta

- Maltese First Division Champion and promoted to Premier League in 2019 playing for Sirens F.C.
