= Deportivo San Pedro =

Association football club in Guatemala

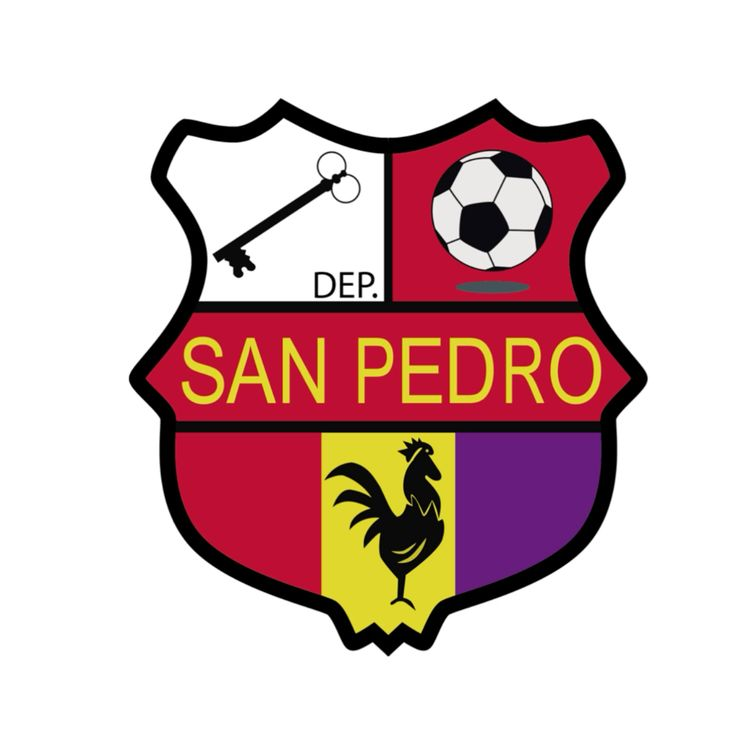
- Full name: Deportivo San Pedro Fútbol Club
- Nickname: Súper Gallos (Super Roosters)
- Founded: 24 May 1994; 32 years ago
- Ground: Estadio Municipal de San Pedro
- Capacity: 6,000
- Chairman: Estuardo Gonzalez
- Manager: Gustavo Reinoso
- League: Primera División
- Clausura 2024: Group A 5th (Quarterfinals)

Deportivo San Pedro Fútbol Club is a Guatemalan football club based in San Pedro Sacatepéquez, San Marcos Department. They currently compete in the Liga Bantrab; the top tier of Guatemalan football, and play their home games in the Estadio Municipal de San Pedro.

== History ==
It was founded in 1992 is better known as the roosters that has won 3 titles throughout its history won a first division title in 2008 he won the University of San Carlos later in 2015 and descended to second division and won one of his two second division titles against the sports Reu 4–2 at the San Miguel Petapa Stadium, then achieved the ascent at the pensive stadium against Siquinala where he won 1–0 on June 12, 2016, and by bad administration the sports San Pedro descended again to the second division and that same year he achieved another division league title against the sportsman Quiché 1-0 at the mario camposeco stadium on December 10, 2017, in 2018 he achieved the first division ascent earning the ascent at the mario camposeco stadium On June 10, 2018 against Panajachel 5–1, the sportsman San Pedro achieved second place in the Guatemalan Cup tournament in 2019 against the Coban sportsman losing the first leg 1–2 and the second leg 2–0.

The sportsman San Pedro has a hobby that has never abandoned him.

== Players ==
=== Current squad ===
Note: Flags indicate national team as defined under FIFA eligibility rules; some limited exceptions apply. Players may hold more than one non-FIFA nationality.

No.	Pos.	Nation	Player
—	Goalkeeper	GUA	Mynor Padilla
—	Goalkeeper	GUA	Estuardo Sican
—	Defending	GUA	Danny Us
—	Defending	GUA	Luis Cardona
—	Defending	GUA	Pablo Solórzano
—	Defending	GUA	Wilson Diaz
—	Defending	GUA	Brailin de Leon
—	Defending	GUA	Manuel Moreno
—		GUA	Jimmy Ovalle
—		GUA	Juan Jiménez
—		GUA	Yeyson Ramos

No.	Pos.	Nation	Player
—		GUA	Eduardo Goméz
—		GUA	Kevin Icute
—		GUA	Cesar Madrid
—		BRA	Diogo Kachuba
—		GUA	Carlos "Chaly" Rodriguez
—		GUA	Kevin Lam
—		GUA	Edi Gomez
—	Middle	GUA	Marco Pappa
—	forward	PAN	Enrrico Small
—	forward	ARG	Leandro Rodriguez

== List of coaches ==
- (Honduras) Douglas Zamora (2017)
- (Guatemala) Adrián Barrios (2018)
- (Argentina) Roberto Gamarra (2019)
- (Guatemala) Francisco Melgar (2020)
