= Willian (footballer, born 1983) =

Brazilian footballer

Willian Xavier
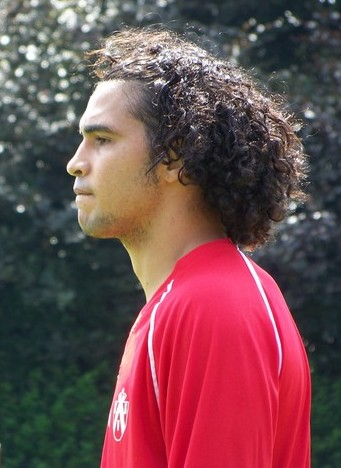
- Willian at KV Kortrijk in 2008

Personal information
- Full name: Willian Xavier Barbosa
- Date of birth: 22 September 1983 (age 43)
- Place of birth: Campo Grande, Brazil
- Height: 1.89 m (6 ft 2 1/2 in)
- Position: Forward

Senior career*
Years	Team	Apps	(Gls)
2000	Comercial (MS)	?	(?)
2001	Figueirense	?	(?)
2001–2003	Atlético Paranaense	?	(?)
2003	→ Votuporanguense (loan)	?	(?)
2004	Rio Branco (SP)	?	(?)
2005	America (RJ)	0	(0)
2005–2006	Vasco da Gama	9	(1)
2006–2007	Botafogo	4	(0)
2007	→ Vegalta Sendai (loan)	2	(0)
2007	Vitória	0	(0)
2008	Rio Preto	0	(0)
2008–2010	Botafogo (SP)	0	(0)
2008–2009	→ KV Kortrijk (loan)	26	(5)
2010–2013	Santo André	1	(0)
2012	→ Portuguesa (loan)		
2014	Botafogo (SP)	10	(2)
- * Club domestic league appearances and goals

Willian Xavier Barbosa, known simply as Willian, (born 22 September 1983) is a Brazilian former footballer who played as a forward.

== Club career ==
Willian signed a new 3-year contract with Atlético Paranaense in 2003

In 2005, he left for Rio de Janeiro club America. In mid-2005 he was signed by Vasco da Gama in short-term contract. He made his Campeonato Brasileiro Série A debut for Vasco. In mid-2006 he left for Botafogo. In January 2007 he was loaned to a Japanese club on loan. He wore no. 11 shirt. However he only played and released on 17 July.

In summer 2008, he was transferred to the Belgian club K.V. Kortrijk which plays in the Belgian first division.

He returned to Brazil in 2010. In mid-2010 he signed a 2-year contract with Santo André, however he broken his leg against Guaratinguetá. Later Guaratinguetá player Júlio César was suspended for 180 days.
