= Robi Levkovich =

Israeli footballer

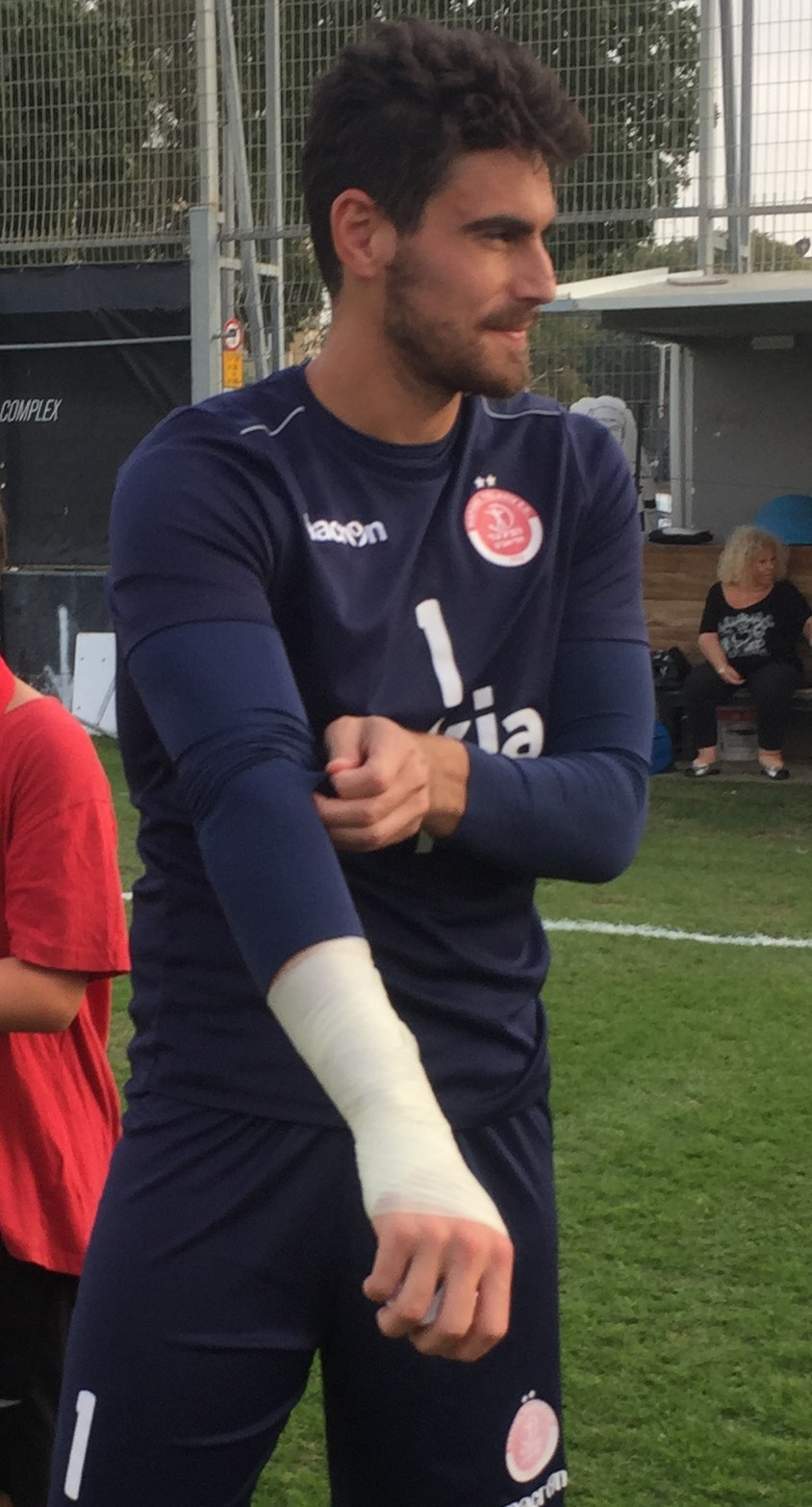

Personal information
- Full name: Robi Levkovich
- Date of birth: August 31, 1988 (age 38)
- Place of birth: Ramat Gan, Israel
- Height: 1.84 m (6 ft 1/2 in)
- Position: Goalkeeper

Team information
- Current team: Hapoel Hadera
- Number: 32

Youth career
- 1999–2003: Hakoah Ramat Gan
- 2003–2007: Hapoel Petah Tikva

Senior career*
Years	Team	Apps	(Gls)
2007–2008	Beitar Shimshon Tel Aviv	4	(0)
2008–2009	Hapoel Bnei Lod	12	(0)
2009	Hapoel Nir Ramat HaSharon	2	(0)
2009–2013	Maccabi Petah Tikva	55	(0)
2013–2014	Maccabi Netanya	1	(0)
2014–2016	Hapoel Be'er Sheva	2	(0)
2016–2017	Hapoel Haifa	7	(0)
2017–2018	Hapoel Petah Tikva	37	(0)
2018–2019	Hapoel Tel Aviv	32	(0)
2019–2020	Honvéd	4	(0)
2020–2023	Hapoel Hadera	91	(0)
2023–2024	Maccabi Petah Tikva	15	(0)
2024–2025	Hapoel Tel Aviv	26	(0)
2026–	Hapoel Hadera	4	(0)

International career
2009–2010	Israel U21	2	(0)
- * Club domestic league appearances and goals as of 15 June 2026

Robi Levkovich (or Rubi, Hebrew: רובי לבקוביץ'; born 31 August 1988) is an Israeli footballer who plays for Hapoel Hadera.

== Early life ==
Gerafi was born in Ramat Gan, Israel, to a family of Ashkenazi Jewish descent.

== Club career statistics ==
As of 1 June 2026

Club	Season	League	League		Cup		League Cup		Europe		Total	
Club	Season	League	Apps	Goals	Apps	Goals	Apps	Goals	Apps	Goals	Apps	Goals
Beitar/Shimshon Tel Aviv	2007–08	Second League	1	0	4	0	4	0	0	0	9	0
Hapoel Bnei Lod	2008–09	Second League	12	0	0	0	3	0	0	0	15	0
Hapoel Nir Ramat HaSharon	2009–10	Second League	2	0	1	0	0	0	0	0	3	0
Maccabi Petah Tikva	2009–10	Premier League	1	0	1	0	1	0	0	0	3	0
Maccabi Petah Tikva	2010–11	Premier League	29	0	0	0	4	0	0	0	32	0
Maccabi Petah Tikva	2011–12	Premier League	7	0	0	0	0	0	0	0	7	0
Maccabi Petah Tikva	2012–13	Second League	18	0	1	0	5	0	0	0	24	0
Maccabi Netanya	2012–13	Premier League	1	0	0	0	0	0	0	0	1	0
Maccabi Netanya	2013–14	Second League	0	0	0	0	0	0	0	0	0	0
Hapoel Be'er Sheva	2014–15	Premier League	2	0	2	0	1	0	0	0	5	0
Hapoel Be'er Sheva	2015–16	Premier League	0	0	1	0	0	0	0	0	1	0
Hapoel Be'er Sheva	2016–17	Premier League	7	0	3	0	3	0	0	0	13	0
Hapoel Petah Tikva	2017–18	Second League	37	0	1	0	0	0	0	0	38	0
Hapoel Tel Aviv	2018–19	Premier League	32	0	2	0	3	0	4	0	41	0
Budapest Honvéd	2019–20	Nemzeti Bajnokság I	4	0	0	0	0	0	0	0	4	0
Hapoel Hadera	2020–21	Premier League	30	0	0	0	1	0	0	0	31	0
Hapoel Hadera	2021–22	Premier League	30	0	2	0	4	0	0	0	36	0
Hapoel Hadera	2022–23	Premier League	31	0	1	0	4	0	0	0	36	0
Maccabi Petah Tikva	2023–24	Premier League	15	0	1	0	4	0	0	0	20	0
Hapoel Tel Aviv	2024–25	Liga Leumit	26	0	4	0	0	0	0	0	30	0
Hapoel Hadera	2025–26	Liga Leumit	4	0	0	0	0	0	0	0	4	0
Total Career			289	0	24	0	34	0	4	0	354	0

== Honours ==
=== Club ===
Maccabi Petah Tikva

- Liga Leumit: 2012–13

Maccabi Netanya

- Israeli State Cup: 2013–14 (runner-up)

Hapoel Be'er Sheva

- Israeli State Cup: 2014–15 (runner-up)
- Israeli Premier League: 2015–16
