= Júlio César (footballer, born October 1980) =

Brazilian footballer

Personal information
- Full name: Júlio César da Cruz Coimbra
- Date of birth: 10 October 1980 (age 46)
- Place of birth: São Gonçalo, RJ, Brazil
- Position: Centre-back

Senior career*
Years	Team	Apps	(Gls)
- ?
2005	Mirassol	0	(0)
2005	América (SP)		
2006	Atlético Sorocaba	0	(0)
2007	Mirassol	0	(0)
2007	Sertãozinho		
2008	Mirassol	0	(0)
2008	América (RN)		
2008–2009	Botafogo (SP)	0	(0)
2009	Criciúma	7	(0)
2010–2011	Guaratinguetá	6	(0)
2011	Fortaleza	1	(0)
- * Club domestic league appearances and goals

Júlio César da Cruz Coimbra known as Júlio César (born 10 October 1980) is a Brazilian footballer.

== Biography ==
On 1 July 2005 he left for Brazilian third division club América (SP). He joined another Série C club Sertãozinho in June 2007. In May 2008 he was signed by América (RN) and transferred to Botafogo (SP) in August, for 2008 Copa Paulista. His contract was extended in December. After played for Botafogo in 2009 Campeonato Paulista, he left for Criciúma. He played 7 out of 8 games in the third division.

In December 2009, he left for Guaratinguetá in 1-year deal. He played 6 games in 2010 Campeonato Brasileiro Série B. He seriously injured Willian in round 5 and later suspended for 6 months. In December 2010 he was offered a new 1-year contract, where he played the first four months with namesake Júlio César de Paula Muniz Júnior. He played 14 matches in the 2011 Campeonato Paulista, which he did not play the last 4 matches (round 16 to 19) and round 12 due to his third caution.

On 13 May 2011 he left for Fortaleza. After only one appearance in the third division, he was released in October.
