= Luis Cardona =

Guatemalan footballer (born 1990)

Personal information
- Full name: Luis Geovani Cardona Abrego
- Date of birth: February 5, 1990 (age 36)
- Place of birth: Guatemala
- Height: 1.90 m (6 ft 3 in)
- Position: Centre back

Team information
- Current team: Suchitepéquez

Senior career*
Years	Team	Apps	(Gls)
–2012	Antigua		
2012–2014	Deportivo Malacateco	85	(1)
2014–2017	Municipal	41	(0)
2017–	Suchitepéquez	17	(0)

International career^{‡}
2013–	Guatemala	6	(0)
- * Club domestic league appearances and goals as of 21:05, 4 May 2017 (UTC) ‡ National team caps and goals as of 20:17, 25 March 2017 (UTC)

Luis Geovani Cardona Abrego (born February 5, 1990) is a Guatemalan football player who currently plays as a defender for C.D. Suchitepéquez.

== Club career ==
In December 2016, it was announced that Cardona would be leaving Municipal for Suchitepéquez, having spent 3 years with the Guatemala City side.

== International career ==
Cardona featured in Guatemala's 9-3 thrashing of Saint Vincent and the Grenadines in September 2016.

National team	Year	Apps	Goals
Guatemala	2013	2	0
Guatemala	2014	0	0
Guatemala	2015	0	0
Guatemala	2016	4	0
Guatemala	2017	0	0
Total		6	0
