= Filip Jazvić =

Croatian footballer

Personal information
- Date of birth: 22 October 1990 (age 36)
- Place of birth: Bugojno, Bosnia and Herzegovina
- Height: 1.88 m (6 ft 2 in)
- Position: Midfielder

Team information
- Current team: Cibalia
- Number: 14

Youth career
- 2000–2005: Dinara Knin
- 2005–2008: Hrvatski Dragovoljac

Senior career*
Years	Team	Apps	(Gls)
2009–2011	Hrvatski Dragovoljac	24	(2)
2009	→ Rudeš (loan)	8	(2)
2009	→ Vrapče (loan)	11	(4)
2010	→ Moslavina Kutina (loan)	12	(5)
2011–2012	Istra 1961	11	(1)
2012	Inter Zaprešić	8	(0)
2012–2014	Hrvatski Dragovoljac	42	(8)
2014–2015	CFR Cluj	18	(2)
2015–2016	Târgu Mureș	26	(5)
2016–2017	Hapoel Haifa	13	(1)
2017	Universitatea Craiova	8	(0)
2017–2018	Arka Gdynia	7	(0)
2018	Olimpia Grudziądz	11	(4)
2018–2019	Željezničar Sarajevo	10	(2)
2019	Hermannstadt	17	(2)
2020–	Cibalia	65	(19)
2021	→ Hrvatski Dragovoljac (loan)	1	(0)
- * Club domestic league appearances and goals as of 22 October 2024

Filip Jazvić (born 22 October 1990) is a Croatian professional footballer who plays as a midfielder for Cibalia.

== Honours ==
Rudeš

- Croatian Third League: 2008–09 (West)

Hrvatski Dragovoljac

- Croatian Second League: 2012–13
