= Bruno Pinheiro (footballer) =

Portuguese footballer

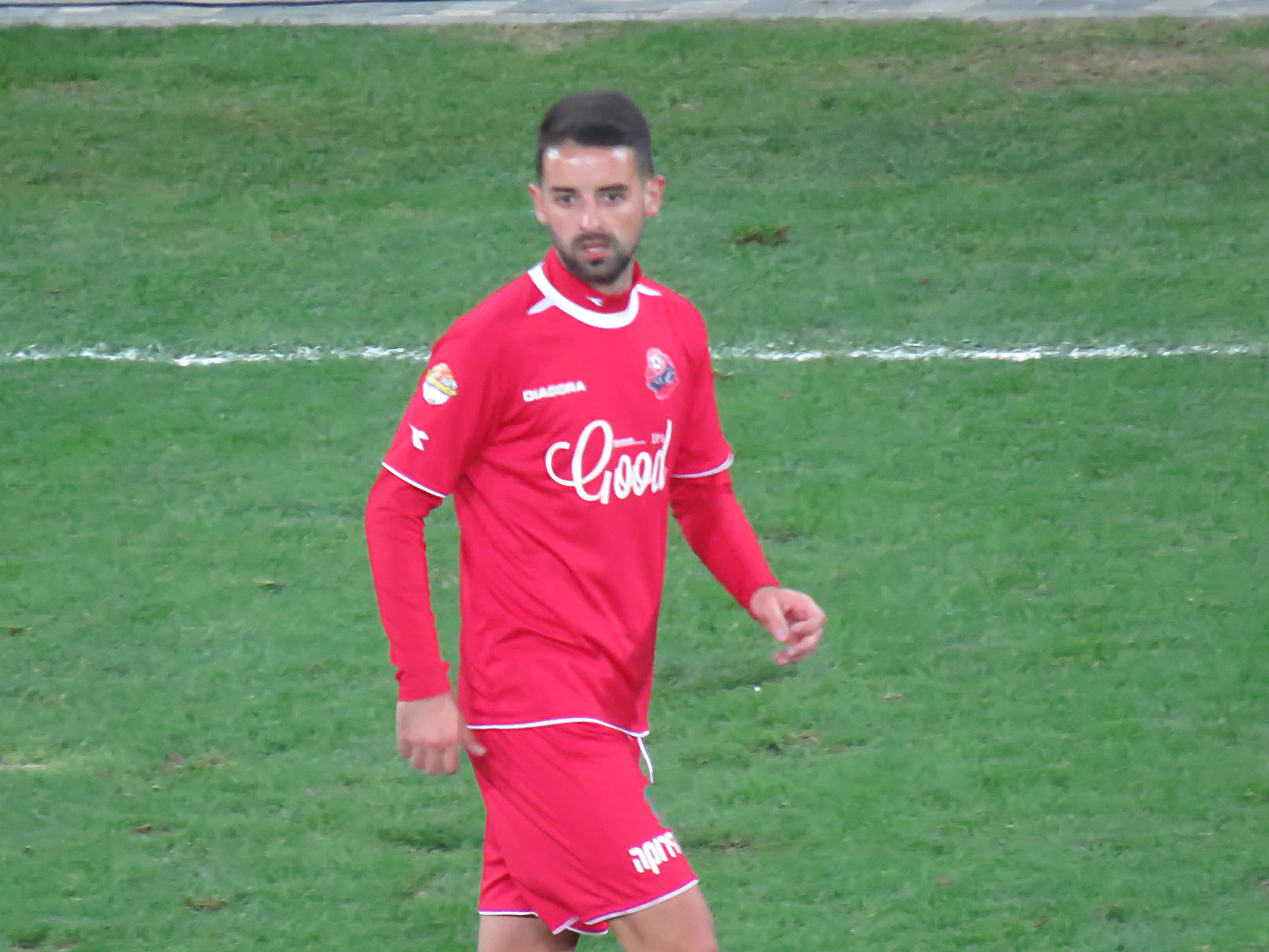
- Pinheiro with Hapoel Haifa in 2016

Personal information
- Full name: Bruno Filipe Tavares Pinheiro
- Date of birth: 21 August 1987 (age 39)
- Place of birth: Paranhos, Portugal
- Height: 1.85 m (6 ft 1 in)
- Positions: Centre-back; defensive midfielder

Team information
- Current team: Valadares Gaia

Youth career
- 1996–2006: Boavista

Senior career*
Years	Team	Apps	(Gls)
2006–2009	Boavista	38	(0)
2006–2007	→ Ribeirão (loan)	25	(0)
2009–2010	Aris Limassol	26	(1)
2010–2012	Widzew Łódź	39	(2)
2012–2013	Gil Vicente	1	(0)
2013	Maccabi Netanya	14	(0)
2014	Niki Volos	20	(1)
2014	Goa	14	(0)
2015	Apollon Smyrnis	11	(1)
2015–2017	Hapoel Haifa	55	(0)
2017–2018	Goa	10	(0)
2018–2019	Army United	27	(1)
2020	Lee Man	5	(0)
2021–2023	São Martinho	44	(1)
2023–2025	Maia Lidador	58	(3)
2026–	Valadares Gaia	6	(0)

International career
2005–2006	Portugal U19	3	(0)
2006–2007	Portugal U20	6	(0)
2008	Portugal U21	1	(0)
2010	Portugal U23	1	(0)
- * Club domestic league appearances and goals as of 22:44, 25 October 2026 (UTC)

Bruno Filipe Tavares Pinheiro (born 21 August 1987) is a Portuguese professional footballer who plays as a central defender or a defensive midfielder.

== Career statistics ==
As of 28 February 2018

Appearances and goals by club, season and competition
Club	Season	League			Cup		Continental		Total	
Club	Season	Division	Apps	Goals	Apps	Goals	Apps	Goals	Apps	Goals
Boavista	2005–06	Primeira Liga	1	0	0	0	—		1	0
Boavista	2007–08	Primeira Liga	16	0	2	0	—		18	0
Boavista	2008–09	Segunda Liga	21	0	1	0	—		22	0
Boavista	Total		38	0	3	0	—		41	0
Ribeirão	2006–07	Segunda Divisão	25	0	2	0	—		27	0
Aris Limassol	2009–10	Cypriot First Division	26	1	0	0	—		26	1
Widzew Łódź	2010–11	Ekstraklasa	14	1	1	0	—		15	1
Widzew Łódź	2011–12	Ekstraklasa	25	1	2	0	—		27	1
Widzew Łódź	Total		39	2	3	0	—		42	2
Gil Vicente	2012–13	Primeira Liga	1	0	2	0	—		3	0
Maccabi Netanya	2012–13	Israeli Premier League	14	0	0	0	—		14	0
Niki Volos	2013–14	Football League	20	1	0	0	—		20	1
Goa	2014	Indian Super League	14	0	—				14	0
Apollon Smyrnis	2014–15	Football League	11	1	4	0	—		15	1
Hapoel Haifa	2015–16	Israeli Premier League	30	0	7	0	—		37	0
Hapoel Haifa	2016–17	Israeli Premier League	25	0	5	0	—		30	0
Hapoel Haifa	Total		55	0	12	0	—		67	0
Goa	2017–18	Indian Super League	10	0	0	0	0	0	10	0
Career total			253	5	26	0	0	0	279	5
