= Luiz Felipe (footballer, born 1985) =

Brazilian footballer

Personal information
- Full name: Luiz Felipe Rodrigues Marques
- Date of birth: February 16, 1985 (age 41)
- Place of birth: Porto Alegre, Brazil
- Height: 1.75 m (5 ft 9 in)
- Position: Right back

Team information
- Current team: CRB

Youth career
- Grêmio

Senior career*
Years	Team	Apps	(Gls)
2004–2008	Grêmio	0	(0)
2007	→ América-MG (loan)		
2007	→ Nacional (AM) (loan)		
2008	→ Vila Nova (loan)		
2008	→ Paulista (loan)		
2008–2010	Juventude	22	(1)
2010–2012	Americana	23	(0)
2012–	CRB		
- * Club domestic league appearances and goals as of 31 August 2012

Luiz Felipe Rodrigues Marques (born 16 February 1985), known as Luiz Felipe, is a Brazilian footballer who plays for Clube de Regatas Brasil as a right defender.

== Honours ==
- Brazilian Second Division: 2005
- Rio Grande do Sul State League: 2006
