= Jason Gorskie =

American soccer player (born 1989)

Personal information
- Full name: Jason Kenneth Gorskie
- Date of birth: September 29, 1989 (age 37)
- Place of birth: United States
- Height: 1.88 m (6 ft 2 in)
- Position: Defender

College career
Years	Team	Apps	(Gls)
2007–2010	Penn Quakers	52	(4)

Senior career*
Years	Team	Apps	(Gls)
2010–2012	New Jersey Rangers	40	(1)
2013–2014	Wisła Puławy	25	(0)
2015	Lyn	11	(0)
2015	Lyn 2	2	(0)
2015–2016	Pietà Hotspurs		
2016	Bnei Sakhnin	0	(0)
- * Club domestic league appearances and goals

Jason Kenneth Gorskie (born September 29, 1989) is an American former professional soccer player who played as a defender.

== Career ==
In 2013, Gorskie signed for Polish side Wisła Puławy. Before the 2015 season, he signed for Lyn in Norway. In 2015, he signed for Maltese second-tier club Pietà Hotspurs. In 2016, Gorskie signed for Bnei Sakhnin in the Israeli top flight, where he made three cup appearances. On July 31, 2016, he debuted for Bnei Sakhnin during a 2–2 draw with Hapoel Haifa.
