= Piet Velthuizen =

Dutch footballer (born 1986)

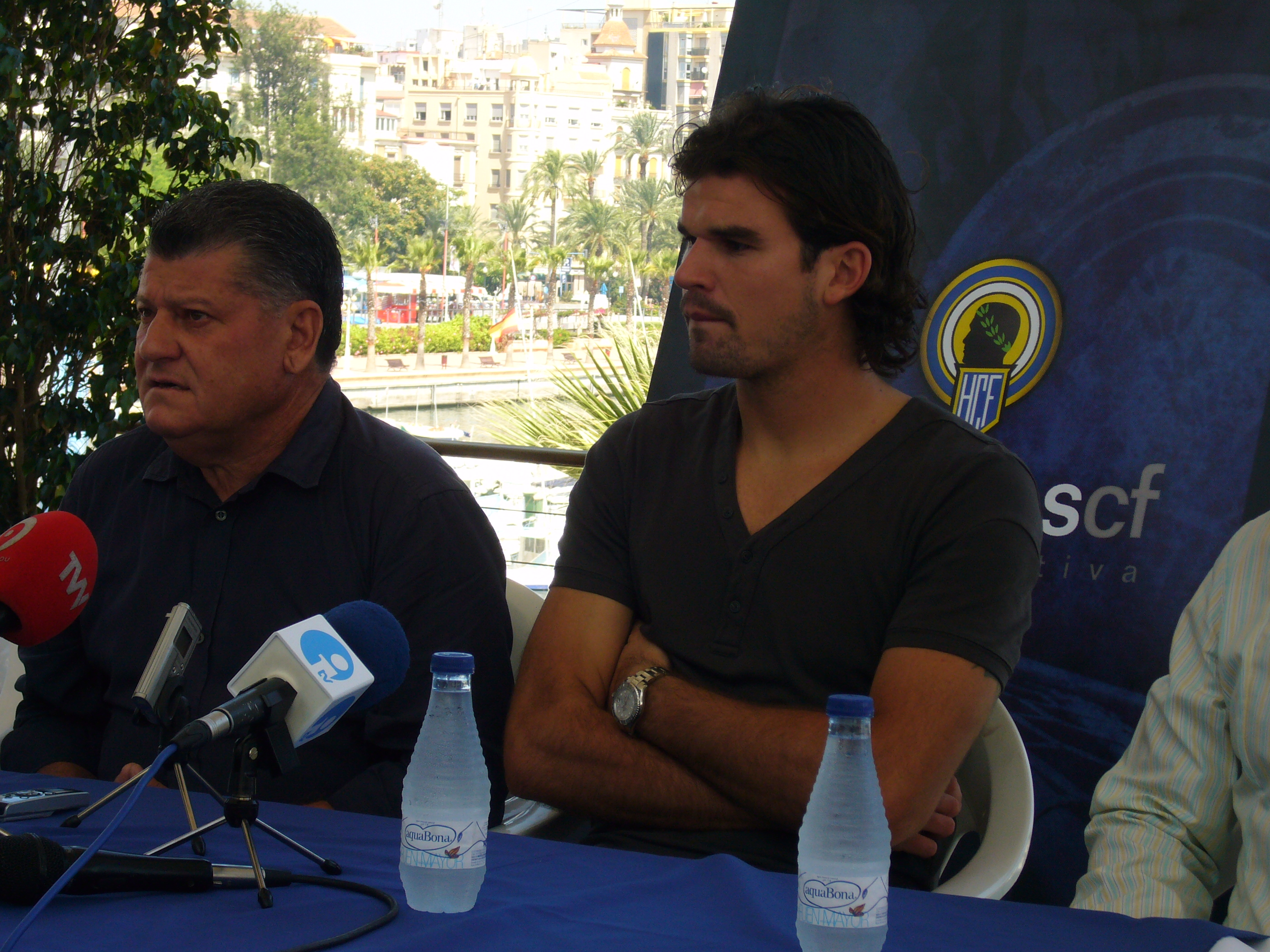

Personal information
- Full name: Piet Hubertus Velthuizen
- Date of birth: 3 November 1986 (age 40)
- Place of birth: Nijmegen, Netherlands
- Height: 1.89 m (6 ft 2 in)
- Position: Goalkeeper

Youth career
- SCE
- Quick 1888
- –2006: Vitesse/ AGOVV

Senior career*
Years	Team	Apps	(Gls)
2006–2010	Vitesse	108	(0)
2010–2011	Hércules	3	(0)
2011–2016	Vitesse	108	(0)
2016–2017	Hapoel Haifa	27	(0)
2017	Omonia	9	(0)
2018–2019	AZ	0	(0)
2020	Telstar	0	(0)
2021	Fortuna Sittard	2	(0)
Total		257	(0)

International career
2007–2008	Netherlands U-21	8	(0)
2008–2009	Netherlands B	3	(0)
2009	Netherlands	1	(0)
- * Club domestic league appearances and goals

Piet Velthuizen (Dutch pronunciation: [pit ˈfɛltɦœyzə(n)]; (Note: In isolation, Velthuizen is pronounced [ˈvɛltɦœyzə(n)].) born 3 November 1986) is a Dutch former professional footballer who played as a goalkeeper. He participated in the 2008 Summer Olympics.

== Club career ==
=== Vitesse ===
Velthuizen made his first team debut on 31 December 2006, in the 2–2 away match against Willem II. His career developed rapidly, and according to Sky Sports, he was among the most promising goalkeepers in Europe in 2008. He broke into the Vitesse first team in the 2007–08 season, when he signed a contract extension until 2011.

=== Hércules ===
In the summer of 2010 Velthuizen joined Spanish side Hércules for €800,000 as they sought to strengthen their squad for their first season back in the top flight after a thirteen-year absence. He had to settle as second choice to Calatayud, making just 5 appearances in all competitions.

=== Vitesse return ===
After one solitary season in Spain which culminated with Hércules being relegated Velthuizen re-joined Vitesse and instantly became first-choice goalkeeper again. He remained a constant in the Vitesse goal until November 2014 when he lost his place to Eloy Room. After his only appearance of the 2015/16 season coming in a 4-1 extra time defeat to Heracles Almelo in a cup match in which Vitesse had to play the entire period of extra time with 8 men due to three sendings off, he departed at the end of his contract.

=== Hapoel Haifa ===
Velthuizen then moved on to Israel joining Hapoel Haifa. He was their main goalie as they finished in 8th place - their highest finish in 16 years.

=== Omonia Nicosia ===
On 17 July 2017, Velthuizen signed a contract with the Cypriot First Division club Omonia Nicosia where he would play alongside compatriot Hedwiges Maduro. He would end up cancelling his contract on 1 January 2018 after just 9 games.

=== AZ ===
After two seasons away Velthuizen returned to the country of his birth joining AZ Alkmaar on 28 August 2018 as back up to Marco Bizot after an injury to the normal number two Rody de Boer. This spell ultimately proved unsuccessful as he failed to make an appearance and was released at the end of the season.

=== Telstar ===
On 10 February 2020, after seven months without a club, he joined Telstar in the Eerste Divisie. He left the club at the end of the season.

=== Fortuna Sittard ===
On 26 February 2021, Velthuizen joined Fortuna Sittard on a deal for the rest of the season. Despite Velthuizen being unfit according to goalkeepers coach Sieb Dijkstra, who had publicly spoken against the club signing him, head coach Sjors Ultee gave him his Fortuna debut two days later against Groningen. Velthuizen, however, fell out with a hamstring injury in the 22nd minute. The conflict led to Dijkstra's dismissal from Fortuna's coaching staff.

== International career ==
Velthuizen received his first call-up to the Dutch squad on 21 March 2008 for the friendly match against Austria. On 5 September 2009, he made his debut for the national team in a friendly match against Japan after coming on as a half time substitute for Michel Vorm. He managed to keep a clean sheet in the 3–0 win.

=== 2008 Summer Olympics ===
He was selected by Foppe de Haan to be in the squad for the 2008 Olympic Games in Beijing, China. Although being first choice in most of the run-up to the Olympics, he was told by De Haan he would be second choice after the other Dutch goalkeeper in the squad; Kenneth Vermeer.

== Career statistics ==
Appearances and goals by club, season and competition
Club	Season	League			National cup		League cup		Europe		Other		Total	
Club	Season	Division	Apps	Goals	Apps	Goals	Apps	Goals	Apps	Goals	Apps	Goals	Apps	Goals
Vitesse	2006–07	Eredivisie	8	0	0	0	—		—		0	0	8	0
Vitesse	2007–08	Eredivisie	33	0	0	0	—		—		—		33	0
Vitesse	2008–09	Eredivisie	33	0	2	0	—		—		—		35	0
Vitesse	2009–10	Eredivisie	33	0	2	0	—		—		—		35	0
Vitesse	2010–11	Eredivisie	1	0	0	0	—		—		—		1	0
Vitesse	Total		108	0	4	0	—		—		0	0	112	0
Hércules	2010–11	La Liga	3	0	2	0	—		—		—		5	0
Vitesse	2011–12	Eredivisie	29	0	3	0	—				4	0	36	0
Vitesse	2012–13	Eredivisie	34	0	0	0	—		4	0	—		38	0
Vitesse	2013–14	Eredivisie	34	0	3	0	—		2	0	2	0	41	0
Vitesse	2014–15	Eredivisie	11	0	1	0	—		—		0	0	12	0
Vitesse	2015–16	Eredivisie	0	0	1	0	—		—		—		1	0
Vitesse	Total		108	0	8	0	—		6	0	6	0	128	0
Hapoel Haifa	2016–17	Israeli Premier League	27	0	5	0	1	0	—		—		33	0
Omonia	2017–18	Cypriot First Division	9	0	0	0	—		—		—		9	0
AZ Alkmaar	2018–19	Eredivisie	0	0	0	0	—		—		—		0	0
Telstar	2019–20	Eerste Divisie	0	0	0	0	—		—		—		0	0
Fortuna Sittard	2020–21	Eredivisie	2	0	—		—		—		—		2	0
Career total			257	0	19	0	1	0	6	0	6	0	289	0
