= Avi Malka =

Israeli footballer

Personal information
- Full name: Avi Malka
- Date of birth: 28 July 1987 (age 39)
- Place of birth: Be'er Sheva, Israel
- Height: 1.92 m (6 ft 3 1/2 in)
- Position: Center back

Team information
- Current team: F.C. Arad

Youth career
- Beitar Be'er Sheva
- Beitar Tubruk

Senior career*
Years	Team	Apps	(Gls)
2006–2007	Ironi Ofakim	16	(1)
2007–2011	Maccabi Be'er Sheva	85	(1)
2008–2009	→ Maccabi Netivot	26	(4)
2011–2014	Maccabi Herzliya	87	(1)
2014–2015	Maccabi Kiryat Gat	33	(0)
2015–2018	Hapoel Ashkelon	79	(0)
2018–2020	Hapoel Katamon	45	(1)
2020–2022	Hapoel Ashdod	31	(1)
2022–2024	F.C. Dimona	56	(0)
2024–	F.C. Arad	45	(2)
- * Club domestic league appearances and goals as of 1 June 2026

Avi Malka (Hebrew: אבי מלכה; born 28 July 1987) is an Israeli footballer who plays as a center back for F.C. Arad in Liga Gimel.
