= Georgi Batyayev =

Russian football player

Georgi Batyayev Георгий Арсенович Батяев
Personal information
- Full name: Georgi Arsenovich Batyayev
- Date of birth: 15 February 1997 (age 29)
- Place of birth: Vladikavkaz, Russia
- Height: 1.84 m (6 ft 1/2 in)
- Position: Midfielder

Youth career
- FC Dynamo Moscow

Senior career*
Years	Team	Apps	(Gls)
2015	FC Fakel Voronezh	0	(0)
2016–2017	F.C. Ashdod	3	(0)
2018	FC Tyumen	0	(0)
2019	FC Zorky Krasnogorsk	8	(0)
2019	FC Ararat Moscow	14	(0)
2020	FC Olimp Khimki	0	(0)
2020–2022	FC Sakhalinets Moscow (amateur)		
- * Club domestic league appearances and goals as of 9 November 2019

Georgi Arsenovich Batyayev (Russian: Георгий Арсенович Батяев; born 15 February 1997) is a Russian football player. His last name is also listed as Batayev (Russian: Батаев) in some Russian sources.

== Club career ==
He signed a 2.5-year contract with F.C. Ashdod in November 2016.

He made his professional debut for F.C. Ashdod on 25 January 2017 in an Israeli Premier League game against Bnei Yehuda Tel Aviv F.C.
