= Issoumaila Lingane =

Burkinabé footballer (born 1991)

Issoumaïla Lingané
Personal information
- Full name: Issoumaïla Lingané
- Date of birth: 15 March 1991 (age 35)
- Place of birth: Bouaflé, Ivory Coast
- Height: 1.83 m (6 ft 0 in)
- Position: Midfielder

Team information
- Current team: Ashdod

Youth career
- 2001–2003: Planète Champion
- 2003–2007: Académie de Sol Beni

Senior career*
Years	Team	Apps	(Gls)
2007–2010	ASEC Mimosas	20	(1)
2008	→ Rail Club du Kadiogo (loan)	20	(1)
2009	→ Sabé Sports de Bouna (loan)	11	(0)
2011–2013	SOA	?	(?)
2013–2015	Hapoel Ramat Gan	53	(10)
2015–2016	Hapoel Tel Aviv	16	(0)
2016	→ Maccabi Netanya (loan)	7	(0)
2016–2017	Hapoel Ashkelon	23	(6)
2017–2018	Adana Demirspor	16	(0)
2019	F.C. Ashdod	14	(1)

International career
2007	Burkina Faso U17	12	(0)
- * Club domestic league appearances and goals

Issoumaïla "Issou" Lingané (born 15 March 1991) is a Burkinabé footballer, who plays as a midfielder.

== Career ==
He was transferred from Planète Champion in Burkina Faso to Académie de Sol Beni in Ivory Coast in January 2008. Then, he was promoted to the first team. After one season with ASEC Mimosas, he returned to Burkina Faso, and signed a loan deal with Rail Club du Kadiogo. Lingane played one year with Rail Club du Kadiogo, before signing in the summer of 2009 with Sabé Sports de Bouna. After one year with Rail Club du Kadiogo, he was loaned out from ASEC Mimosas to Ligue rival Sabé Sports de Bouna, before returning to ASEC Abidjan in December 2009.

== Attributes ==
Lingané is a midfielder for ASEC. He plays for the club occasionally, with his appearances and training performance characterized by his passing and confidence.

== International career ==
He presented Burkina Faso at U-17 level. He was also called up for an African Cup of Nations preparation game for the Burkina Faso national team in 2013, but he didn't make it to the final squad.
