= Dele Aiyenugba =

Nigerian footballer (born 1983)

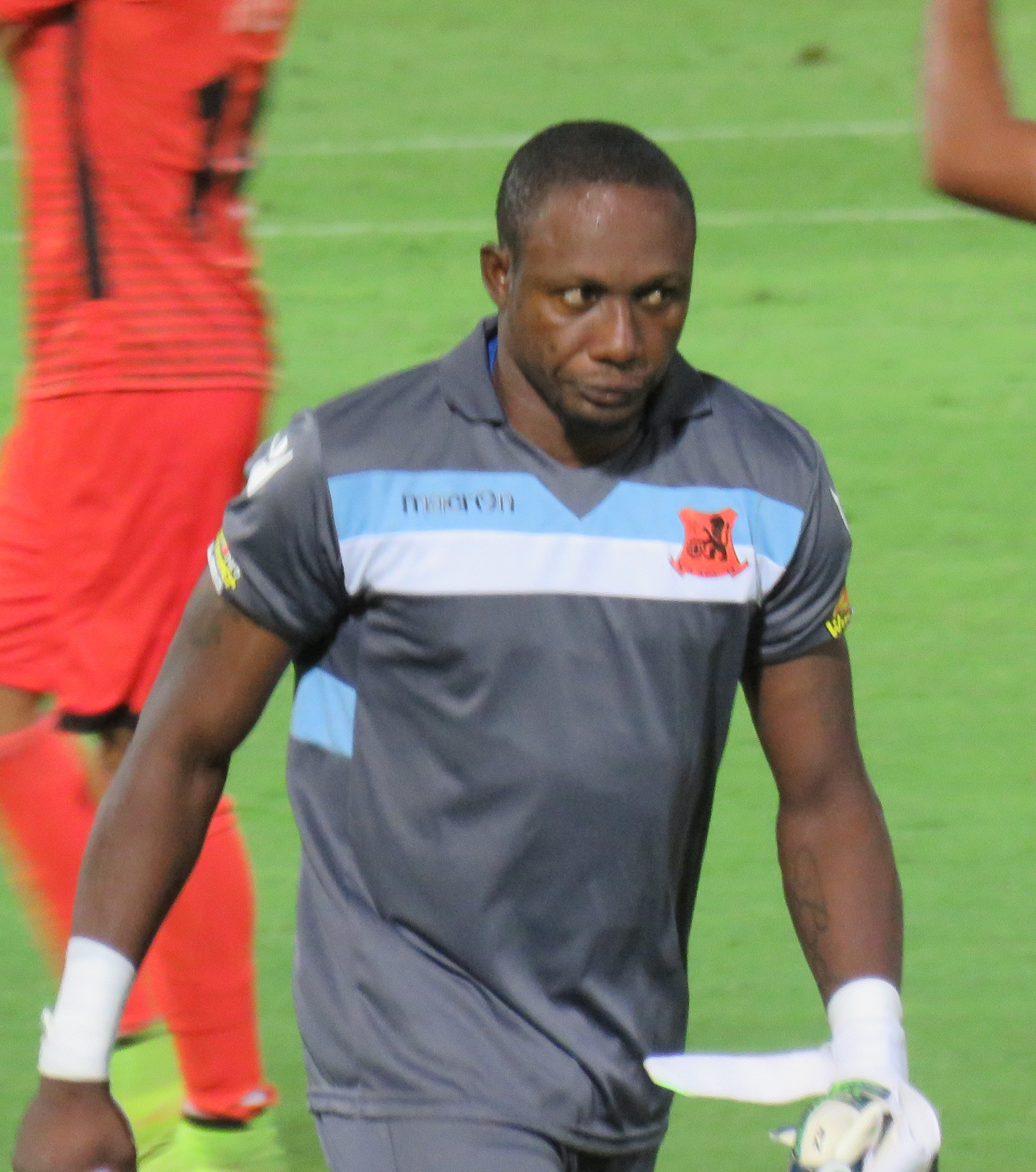
- Aiyenugba playing for Bnei Yehuda in 2015

Personal information
- Full name: Bamidele Mathew Aiyenugba
- Date of birth: 20 November 1983 (age 42)
- Place of birth: Jos, Nigeria
- Height: 1.81 m (5 ft 11 in)
- Position: Goalkeeper

Senior career*
Years	Team	Apps	(Gls)
1998–2000	Kwara Stars		
2001–2007	Enyimba		
2007–2016	Bnei Yehuda	294	(0)
2016–2018	Hapoel Ashkelon	62	(0)
2018–2019	Hapoel Iksal	33	(0)
2019–2020	Hapoel Afula	13	(0)
2020-2024	Kwara United	63	(0)
Total		402	(0)

International career
2005–2015	Nigeria	17	(0)
- * Club domestic league appearances and goals

Bamidele Mathew Aiyenugba (born 20 November 1983) is a Nigerian former professional footballer who played as a goalkeeper. His name, Bamidele, means "Follow me home" in Yoruba language.

After 13 seasons in Israel with four teams, Aiyenugba returned to Nigeria ahead of the 2020–21 season to play for Kwara United.

== Club career ==
Aiyenugba began his career with Nigerian club Kwara Stars before moving to Enyimba. Having developed into the club's first-choice goalkeeper, he helped Enyimba win the Nigeria Premier League in 2002 and 2003, and contributed to the club's consecutive CAF Champions League titles in 2003 and 2004. He also won the CAF Super Cup twice.

In 2007, Aiyenugba left Enyimba and moved to Israeli club Bnei Yehuda. He spent nine seasons with the club, serving as their first-choice goalkeeper.

In 2016, he moved to Hapoel Ashkelon, where he spent two seasons. He subsequently joined Hapoel Iksal in 2018, spending one season there, before moving to Hapoel Afula in 2019. Aiyenugba thus spent 13 seasons playing in Israel across four clubs.

In 2020, Aiyenugba returned to Nigeria and joined Kwara United. He continued to serve as the club's first-choice goalkeeper following his return and recorded several clean sheets in the team's Nigerian league matches during the 2020–21 season.

Aiyenugba continued his playing career with Kwara United and remained with the club until 2024, when he retired from professional football.

== International career ==
Aiyenugba was first called up to the Nigeria national team in 2005, while he was playing for Enyimba. He subsequently competed for the national-team goalkeeper position alongside players such as Vincent Enyeama and Austin Ejide.

He was part of the Nigeria national team squad at the 2006 Africa Cup of Nations, where Nigeria finished third. He was subsequently included in Nigeria's squads for the 2008 Africa Cup of Nations and the 2010 Africa Cup of Nations.

In 2010, he was included in Nigeria's final 23-man squad for the 2010 FIFA World Cup. Aiyenugba was named alongside Vincent Enyeama and Austin Ejide as one of Nigeria's goalkeepers, but did not make an appearance at the tournament. Nigeria were eliminated in the group stage.

Aiyenugba continued to represent the Nigeria national team thereafter, before ending his international career in 2015. He made a total of 17 appearances for the national team.

== Personal life ==
Aiyenugba was born in Jos, Nigeria.

His son, Daniel Aiyenugba, is also a goalkeeper. The two played against each other when Kwara United played against Beyond Limits in the semi-finals of the Value Jet Cup in Ikenne, in August 2023.

== Honours ==
Enyimba

- Nigerian Premier League: 2002, 2003, 2005, 2007
- Nigerian FA Cup: 2005
- Nigerian Super Cup: 2003
- African Champions League: 2003, 2004
- African Super Cup: 2004, 2005
