= Oshri Roash =

Israeli footballer

Oshri Roash אושרי רואש
Personal information
- Full name: Oshri Roash
- Date of birth: July 25, 1988 (age 38)
- Place of birth: Haifa, Israel
- Height: 1.76 m (5 ft 9 in)
- Position: Center-back

Team information
- Current team: Hapoel Haifa
- Number: 21

Youth career
- Hapoel Haifa

Senior career*
Years	Team	Apps	(Gls)
2006–2017	Hapoel Haifa	257	(2)

International career^{‡}
2007–2010	Israel U21	19	(1)
- * Club domestic league appearances and goals as of 18 October 2010 ‡ National team caps and goals as of 18 October 2010

Oshri Roash (Hebrew: אושרי רואש; born 25 July 1988) is an Israeli former footballer. He played all his career for Hapoel Haifa.

He is of a Tunisian-Jewish descent.
