= Adilson Bahia =

Brazilian footballer (born 1992)

Personal information
- Full name: Adilson Reis da Anunciação
- Date of birth: 27 September 1992 (age 34)
- Place of birth: Salvador, Brazil
- Height: 1.77 m (5 ft 10 in)
- Position: Forward

Team information
- Current team: Ferroviário

Youth career
- Mirassol

Senior career*
Years	Team	Apps	(Gls)
2012–2013	Mirassol	1	(0)
2013	CRB	2	(0)
2014	São Luiz	10	(3)
2015–2016	Pelotas	16	(6)
2016–2017	Hapoel Haifa	31	(5)
2017–2018	Ashdod	12	(0)
2018	Maccabi Ahi Nazareth	11	(2)
2019	Cascavel	0	(0)
2019	Udon Thani	12	(1)
2020	Portuguesa	15	(5)
2021–	Ferroviário	2	(0)
- * Club domestic league appearances and goals as of 24 February 2021 (UTC)

Adilson Reis da Anunciação (born 27 September 1992), known as Adilson Bahia, is a Brazilian footballer who plays for Ferroviário as a forward.

== Career ==
=== Hapoel Haifa ===
Adilson came to the training camp of Hapoel Haifa in Italy to audition in a group, in a friendly against Bologna scored a goal for Hapoel Haifa, who lost 2–1 at the end, on 31 July 2016 conquered his debut in his first appearance as part of the Toto Cup in front of Bnei Sakhnin who which ended in a 2–2 draw, the game has signed Adilson season with an option for another season. On 20 August 2016 premiere captured his first appearance on the first round of the Premier League against Hapoel Ashkelon after the game ends Hapoel Haifa lost 3–2.
