= Júlio César (footballer, born 1988) =

Brazilian footballer

Personal information
- Full name: Júlio César de Paula Muniz Júnior
- Date of birth: 4 January 1988 (age 38)
- Place of birth: Itaguaí, Brazil
- Height: 1.80 m (5 ft 11 in)
- Position: Midfielder

Team information
- Current team: São José

Youth career
- 2003–2005: Palmeiras
- 2005: Artsul
- 2006–2008: Grêmio

Senior career*
Years	Team	Apps	(Gls)
2009	Grêmio	0	(0)
2010	Artsul	0	(0)
2010	→ Juventude (loan)	6	(0)
2011–2013	Guaratinguetá	89	(1)
2012	→ Volta Redonda (loan)	7	(1)
2014	Avaí	24	(0)
2015	Capivariano	9	(0)
2015	Atlético CP	2	(0)
2015	Capivariano	1	(0)
2016–2017	Hapoel Haifa	23	(2)
2017–2018	Hapoel Katamon	18	(3)
2018	Cascavel	?	(?)
2019–	São José	0	(0)
- * Club domestic league appearances and goals as of 10 April 2019

Júlio César de Paula Muniz, Jr., known as Júlio César or sometimes Juninho (born 4 January 1988), is a Brazilian footballer who plays for São José.

== Biography ==
Born in Itaguaí, in the state of Rio de Janeiro, Júlio César started his professional career at Grêmio. He signed a contract in October 2007 and extended to 31 December 2009 in December 2008. He played a few games in 2009 Campeonato Gaúcho.

In January 2010 he was signed by Artsul in 1-year contract. On 1 February he returned to Rio Grande do Sul state for Juventude, where he met his namesake Júlio César Zabotto. He played twice in both 2010 Campeonato Gaúcho and 2010 Copa do Brasil before Zabotto formally available on 25 February. Both players did not play any game since March 2010. However his contract was extended until the end of 2010 Campeonato Brasileiro Série C in May. He was released after the team failed to advance to stage two.

In January 2011 he left for Guaratinguetá (at that time the club relocated to Americana) in 3-year contract. However, in the first half of the season, his namesake, centre-back Júlio César Coimbra was a regular starter. He played the last 4 matches of 2011 Campeonato Paulista, which J.César Coimbra did not play.

In May J.César Coimbra left the club but in July the club signed Júlio César Zabotto. He played 12 out of first 15 matches of the second division, but only collected 3 appearances in the second half of the league (also after the arrival of the namesake), on 30 August, on 27 September. and on 26 November (last round). He was substituted by Gercimar in the first half on 6 August, his 12th appearance, again first match when Zabotto became available.

In January 2019, César joined São José.
