= Diogo Kachuba =

Brazilian footballer (born 1990)

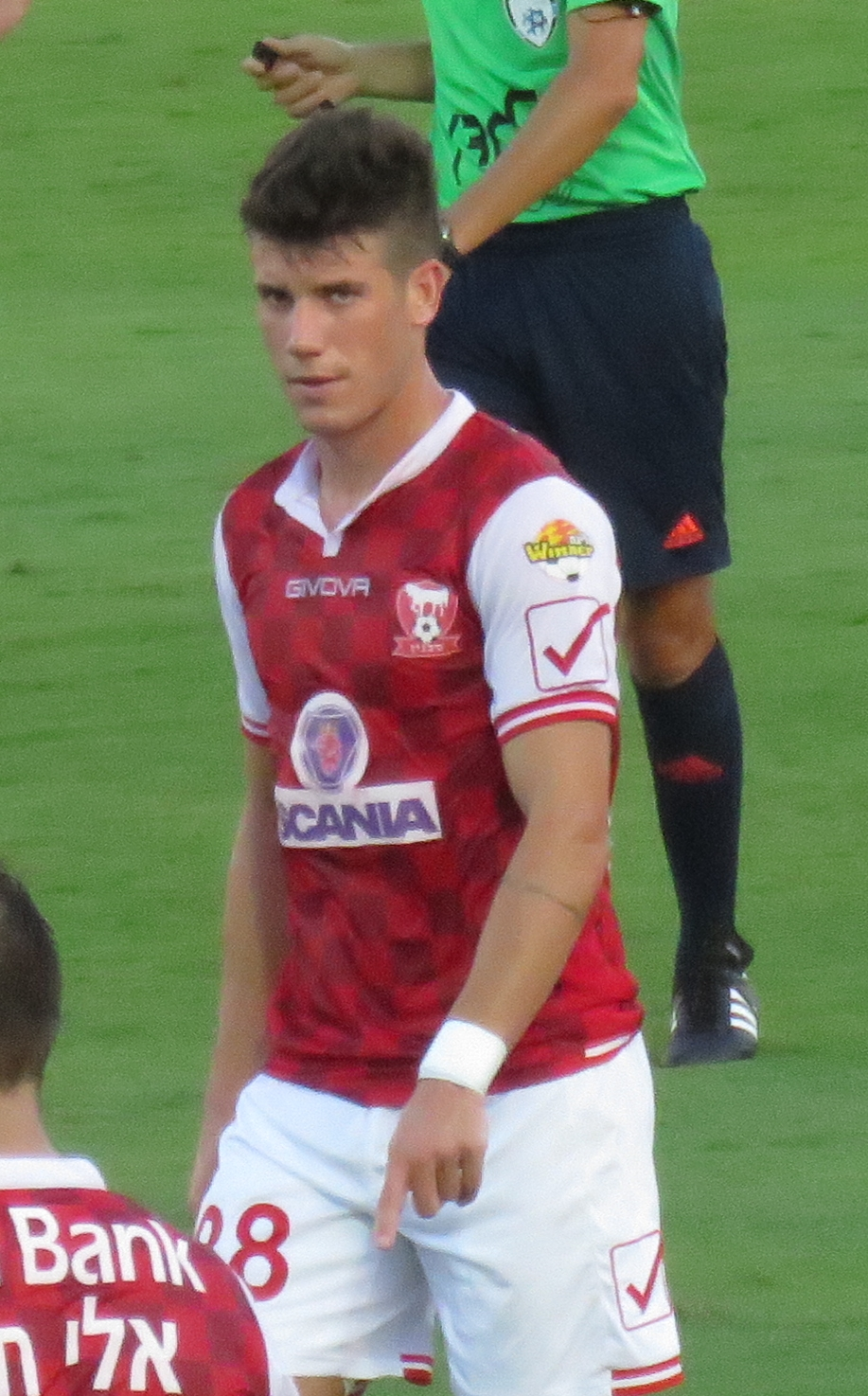

Personal information
- Full name: Diogo Kachuba
- Date of birth: 16 February 1990 (age 36)
- Place of birth: Cascavel, Brazil
- Height: 1.86 m (6 ft 1 in)
- Position: Midfielder

Team information
- Current team: Deportivo San Pedro

Senior career*
Years	Team	Apps	(Gls)
2011	Santacruzense	24	(4)
2011–2014	Criciúma	3	(0)
2012	→ Americano (loan)	4	(0)
2012	→ América de Natal	1	(0)
2013	→ Catanduvense	11	(0)
2014–2015	Hapoel Jerusalem	31	(4)
2015–2016	Bnei Sakhnin	33	(2)
2016–2017	Hapoel Kfar Saba	23	(1)
2017–2018	Hapoel Bnei Lod	18	(1)
2019	Aurora	43	(4)
2020–	Deportivo San Pedro	0	(0)
- * Club domestic league appearances and goals as of 1 January 2020

Diogo Kachuba (born 16 February 1990) is a Brazilian professional footballer who plays as a midfielder for Deportivo San Pedro, in Guatemala.
