= Yuval Avidor =

Israeli football player

Personal information
- Full name: Yuval Avidor
- Date of birth: 19 October 1986 (age 40)
- Place of birth: Kiryat Motzkin, Israel
- Height: 1.71 m (5 ft 7 1/2 in)
- Position: Forward

Team information
- Current team: F.C. Haifa Robi Shapira

Youth career
- Hapoel Haifa

Senior career*
Years	Team	Apps	(Gls)
2004–2007	Hapoel Haifa	35	(17)
2007–2011	Ironi Kiryat Shmona	62	(15)
2009–2011	→ Maccabi Tel Aviv	36	(6)
2011	→ Hapoel Haifa	31	(13)
2011–2014	Hapoel Haifa	68	(9)
2014–2015	Hapoel Acre	31	(1)
2015–2016	Maccabi Netanya	16	(0)
2016–2017	Bnei Sakhnin	47	(7)
2017–2018	Maccabi Petah Tikva	15	(2)
2018	Bnei Sakhnin	11	(1)
2018–2019	Hapoel Ramat Gan	18	(7)
2019–2020	Hapoel Nof HaGalil	48	(11)
2020–2021	F.C. Kafr Qasim	13	(0)
2021	Hapoel Marmorek	13	(2)
2021–2022	F.C. Haifa Robi Shapira	16	(5)
2022	Maccabi Tzur Shalom	26	(5)

International career
2004–2005	Israel U18	5	(1)
2004–2005	Israel U19	8	(0)
2008	Israel U21	6	(1)
- * Club domestic league appearances and goals

Yuval Avidor (Hebrew: יובל אבידור; born 19 October 1986) is a former Israeli football player. He is known for his speed and ability to play as a striker as well as a winger.

== Early life ==
Avidor was born in Kiryat Motzkin, Israel, to a Jewish family.

== Career ==
=== Hapoel Haifa ===
Avidor made his debut for Hapoel Haifa in 2004–2005 season in the Israeli second division Liga Leumit. He played for Haifa for two more seasons and on 2006–2007 season he finished as the Liga Leumit top goalscorer with 17 goals but missed promotion with the club finishing 3rd.

=== Hapoel Ironi Kiryat Shmona ===
Before the 2007–2008 season he moved to Northern club Ironi Kiryat Shmona which just won promotion to the Israeli Premier League reuniting with his former coach Ran Ben Shimon . Helping the team finish 3rd scoring 9 goals. The next season was last with the club due to his relegation and Avidor scoring only 6 goals.

=== Maccabi Tel Aviv ===
Although his team was relegated Avidor himself became one of the biggest transfer prospects of the summer. Which concluded with signing a one-year contract with giants Maccabi Tel Aviv. His first season with the club was a tough one with him scoring only 5 goals and the team finishing 3rd far behind their fierce rivals Hapoel Tel Aviv and Maccabi Haifa. In May 2010 it was announced that Maccabi and Avidor agreed on the extension of his contract.

=== Hapoel Haifa ===
On 20 September 2011 he was loaned to Hapoel Haifa from Hapoel Ironi Kiryat Shmona until the end of the 2011–12 season. On 10 December he scored twice in Hapoel's first derby win in ten years.
