= 2015–16 Maccabi Tel Aviv F.C. season =

Maccabi Tel Aviv
2015–16 season
- Chairman: Mitchell Goldhar
- Manager: Slaviša Jokanović (until 27 December 2015); Peter Bosz (from 4 January 2016)
- Stadium: Bloomfield Stadium, Tel Aviv
- Premier League: 2nd
- State Cup: Runners-up
- Toto Cup: Group stage
- Super Cup: Runners-up
- Champions League: Group stage
- Top goalscorer: League: Eran Zahavi (35); All: Eran Zahavi (48)
- Highest home attendance: 29,121 (vs Chelsea, 24 November 2015)
Home colours	Away colours	Third colours

The 2015–16 season is Maccabi Tel Aviv's 110th season since its establishment in 1906, and 68th since the establishment of the State of Israel. During the 2015–16 campaign the club have competed in the Israeli Premier League, State Cup, Toto Cup, Israel Super Cup UEFA Champions League.

On 25 August 2015, the club qualified for the Champions League group stage, after drawing with FC Basel 2–2 (away) and 1–1 (at home).

== Kit ==
Supplier: Adidas / Sponsor: UNICEF

Home	Away	Third	Goalkeeper 1	Goalkeeper Away

== Current squad ==
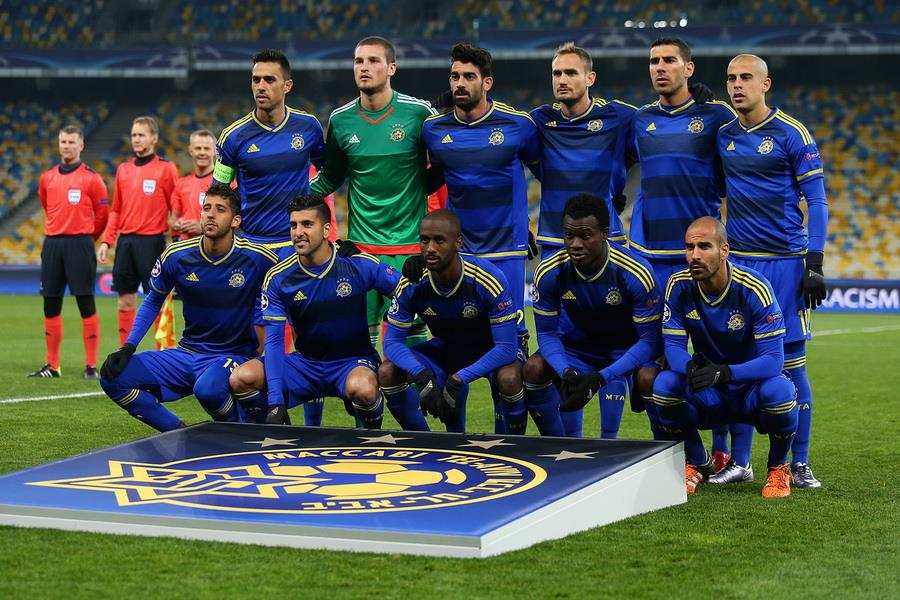
Maccabi Tel Aviv prior to its Champions League match against Dynamo Kyiv on 9 December 2015.

=== First team ===
Note: Flags indicate national team as defined under FIFA eligibility rules; some limited exceptions apply. Players may hold more than one non-FIFA nationality.

No.	Pos.	Nation	Player
1	GK	ISR	Daniel Lifshitz
2	DF	ISR	Eli Dasa
3	DF	ISR	Yuval Spungin
4	MF	BIH	Haris Medunjanin
6	MF	ISR	Gal Alberman
7	MF	ISR	Eran Zahavi
9	FW	ISR	Eden Ben Basat
10	FW	ISR	Barak Yitzhaki
11	FW	ISR	Tal Ben Haim II
14	DF	ISR	Yoav Ziv
15	MF	ISR	Dor Micha

No.	Pos.	Nation	Player
16	MF	ISR	Shlomi Azulay
18	DF	ISR	Eitan Tibi
20	DF	ISR	Omri Ben Harush
22	DF	ISR	Avi Rikan
26	DF	ISR	Tal Ben Haim
31	DF	ESP	Carlos García
40	MF	NGA	Nosa Igiebor
42	MF	ISR	Dor Peretz
55	GK	ISR	Haviv Ohayon
70	FW	POR	Orlando Sá
95	GK	SRB	Predrag Rajković

== Transfers ==
=== Summer ===
In:

No.	Pos.	Nation	Player
—	DF	ISR	Tal Ben Haim (from (England) Charlton Athletic F.C.)
—	FW	NGA	Lanry Kahinda (was on loan to (Israel) Hapoel Afula)
—	MF	ISR	Moshe Lugasi (was on loan to (Israel) Maccbi Petah Tikva)
—	MF	ISR	Hasan Abu Zaid (was on loan to (Israel) Hapoel Petah Tikva)
—	DF	ISR	Sean Goldberg (was on loan to (Israel) Hapoel Tel Aviv)
—	DF	ISR	Avi Rikan (from (Switzerland) FC Zürich)
—	DF	ISR	Eli Dasa (from (Israel) Beitar Jerusalem)
—	DF	ISR	Shlomi Yosef Azulay (from (Israel) Beitar Jerusalem)
—	DF	CRO	Dejan Radonjić (on loan from (Croatia) Dinamo Zagreb)
—	GK	ISR	Daniel Lifshitz (on loan from (Israel) Hapoel Ra'anana)
—	GK	SRB	Predrag Rajković (from (Serbia) Red Star Belgrade)
—	DF	ISR	Oz Raly (on loan from (Israel) Bnei Yehuda Tel Aviv)

Out:

No.	Pos.	Nation	Player
—	DF	ISR	Sheran Yeini (to (Netherlands) Vitesse Arnhem)
—	MF	ISR	Omri Altman (to (Israel) Hapoel Tel Aviv)
—	GK	ISR	Barak Levi (on loan to (Israel) Maccabi Netanya)
—	MF	ISR	Moshe Lugasi (on loan to (Israel) Maccabi Netanya)
—	FW	ISR	Gael Margulies (on loan to (Israel) Maccabi Netanya)
—	MF	ISR	Maharan Radi (to (Israel) Hapoel Be'er Sheva)
—	MF	ISR	Dan Einbinder (to (Israel) Beitar Jerusalem)
—	FW	SWE	Rade Prica (to (Sweden) Helsingborgs IF)
—	FW	NGA	Lanry Kahinda (on loan to (Israel) Hapoel Kfar Saba)
—	MF	ISR	Hasan Abu Zaid (to (Russia) FC Torpedo Armavir)
—	GK	ESP	Juan Pablo (Released)
—	GK	ISR	Sahar Hasson (on loan to (Israel) Beitar Tel Aviv Ramla)
—	MF	ISR	Sean Goldberg (on loan to (Israel) Bnei Yehuda Tel Aviv)
—	FW	ISR	Barak Badash (to (Israel) Hapoel Ra'anana)

=== Winter ===
In:

No.	Pos.	Nation	Player
—	FW	POR	Orlando Sá (from (England) Reading F.C.)
—	MF	BIH	Haris Medunjanin (from (Spain) Deportivo de La Coruña)

Out:

No.	Pos.	Nation	Player
—	DF	ISR	Oz Raly (to (Israel) Hapoel Ironi Kiryat Shmona F.C.)
—	MF	SRB	Nikola Mitrović (to (China) Shanghai Shenxin)
—	FW	CRO	Dejan Radonjić (to (Israel) Hapoel Ra'anana)
—	MF	ISR	Gil Vermouth (to (Israel) Maccabi Haifa F.C.)
—	MF	ISR	Dan Glazer (on loan to (Israel) Beitar Tel Aviv Ramla F.C.)

== Pre-season and friendlies ==
30 June 2015 Training Camp	Maccabi Tel Aviv (Israel)	3–0	(Serbia) FK Voždovac	Leoben, Austria
19:00	Ben Haim 51'; Ben Basat 57', 75' (pen.)

3 July 2015 Training Camp	Maccabi Tel Aviv (Israel)	4–0	(Hungary) Diósgyőri VTK	Leoben, Austria
19:00	Micha 37', 49'; Ben Haim 44'; Igiebor 64'

7 July 2015 Training Camp	Maccabi Tel Aviv (Israel)	1–1	(Russia) FC Anzhi Makhachkala	Leoben, Austria
19:00	Ben Basat 85'		Boli 47'

== UEFA Champions League ==
=== Second qualifying round ===
14 July 2015 First leg	Hibernians (Malta)	2–1	(Israel) Maccabi Tel Aviv	Paola
21:00	Lima (yellow card) 47' (goal) 85'; Jorginho 74'; Dias (yellow card) 82'		Igiebor 22'; Ben Harush (yellow card) 49'; Ben Basat (yellow card) 52'; Micha (yellow card) 84'	Stadium: Hibernians Ground

21 July 2015 Second leg	Maccabi Tel Aviv (Israel)	5–1 (6–3 agg.)	(Malta) Hibernians	Tel Aviv
20:30	Ben Haim FW (yellow card) 21' (goal) 61'; García (yellow card) 23'; Jorginho 32' (o.g.); Zahavi 58' (pen.), 90'; Igiebor 82'; Ben Basat (yellow card) 86'		Borg (yellow card) 15'; Lima (yellow card) 51'; Soares 52' (yellow card) 57'; Cohen (yellow card) 74'	Stadium: Bloomfield; Attendance: 13,000

=== Third qualifying round ===
28 July 2015 First leg	Maccabi Tel Aviv (Israel)	1–2	(Czech Republic) Viktoria Plzeň	Tel Aviv
20:30	Ben Haim DF (yellow card) 3'; Itzhaki 79'; García (yellow card) 81'		Mahmutović 17'; Petržela 21'; Hrošovský (yellow card) 74'	Stadium: Bloomfield; Attendance: 13,420

5 August 2015 Second leg	Viktoria Plzeň (Czech Republic)	0–2 (2–3 agg.)	(Israel) Maccabi Tel Aviv	Plzeň
21:45	Vaněk (yellow card) 22'; Limberský (yellow card) 75'		Zahavi (yellow card) 28' (goal) 76' (pen.), 85'; Itzhaki (yellow card) 50'; Igiebor (yellow card) 70'; Juan Pablo (yellow card) 90+3'	Stadium: Doosan Arena

=== Playoff round ===
19 August 2015 First leg	FC Basel (Switzerland)	2–2	(Israel) Maccabi Tel Aviv	Basel
	Elneny (yellow card) 20'; Delgado 38' (pen.); Suchý (yellow card) 60'; Embolo 88'		Zahavi 31', 90+6'; Igiebor (yellow card) 69'; Alberman (yellow card) 77'	Stadium: St. Jakob-Park

25 August 2015 Second leg	Maccabi Tel Aviv (Israel)	1–1 (3–3 (a) agg.)	(Switzerland) FC Basel	Tel Aviv
21:45	Zahavi 24'; Rikan (yellow card) 62'		Zuffi 11' (yellow card) 74'; Safari (yellow card) 49'; Lang (yellow card) 84'	Stadium: Bloomfield Stadium; Attendance: 13,350

=== Group stage ===
Pos	Team	Pld	W	D	L	GF	GA	GD	Pts	Qualification	CHE	DKV	POR	MTA
1	(England) Chelsea	6	4	1	1	13	3	+10	13	Advance to knockout phase	—	2–1	2–0	4–0
2	(Ukraine) Dynamo Kyiv	6	3	2	1	8	4	+4	11	Advance to knockout phase	0–0	—	2–2	1–0
3	(Portugal) Porto	6	3	1	2	9	8	+1	10	Transfer to Europa League	2–1	0–2	—	2–0
4	(Israel) Maccabi Tel Aviv	6	0	0	6	1	16	−15	0		0–4	0–2	1–3	—

Source: UEFA
Rules for classification: Group stage tiebreakers

16 September 2015 1	Chelsea (England)	4–0	(Israel) Maccabi Tel Aviv	London
21:45	Willian 15'; Oscar 45+4' (pen.); Costa 58'; Fàbregas 78'	Report		Stadium: Stamford Bridge; Attendance: 40,684; Referee: Felix Zwayer (Germany)

29 September 2015 2	Maccabi Tel Aviv (Israel)	0–2	(Ukraine) Dynamo Kyiv	Haifa
		Report	Yarmolenko 4'; Moraes 50'	Stadium: Sammy Ofer; Attendance: 27,100; Referee: David Fernández Borbalán (Spain)

20 October 2015 3	Porto (Portugal)	2–0	(Israel) Maccabi Tel Aviv	Porto
21:45	Aboubakar 37'; Brahimi 40'	Report		Stadium: Estádio do Dragão; Attendance: 35,209; Referee: Clément Turpin (France)

4 November 2015 4	Maccabi Tel Aviv (Israel)	1–3	(Portugal) Porto	Haifa
21:45	Zahavi 75' (pen.)	Report	Tello 19'; André 49'; Layún 71'	Stadium: Sammy Ofer; Attendance: 26,646; Referee: Anastasios Sidiropoulos (Greece)

24 November 2015 5	Maccabi Tel Aviv (Israel)	0–4	(England) Chelsea	Haifa
21:45	Ben Haim I (red card) 45'	Report	Cahill 20'; Willian 73'; Oscar 77'; Zouma 90+1'	Stadium: Sammy Ofer; Attendance: 29,121; Referee: Alberto Undiano Mallenco (Spain)

9 December 2015 6	Dynamo Kyiv (Ukraine)	1–0	(Israel) Maccabi Tel Aviv	Kyiv
	Harmash 16'	Report		Stadium: Olimpiyskiy National Sports Complex; Attendance: 0 (Behind closed doors); Referee: Björn Kuipers (Netherlands)

== Israeli Premier League ==
=== Regular season ===
Win Draw Loss

22 August 2015 1	Maccabi Tel Aviv	3–2	Bnei Sakhnin	Tel Aviv
17:45	Zahavi 22', 81'; Peretz (yellow card) 45'; Ben Haim FW (yellow card) 65' (goal) 67'; Mitrović (red card) 87'	Report	Georginho 10' (yellow card) 27'; Khalaila (yellow card) 45'; Abu Saleh (yellow card) 66'; Amasha 90'	Stadium: Bloomfield; Attendance: 11,007; Referee: Eli Hakmon

29 August 2015 2	Hapoel Be'er Sheva	0–1	Maccabi Tel Aviv	Jerusalem
20:55	Bitton (yellow card) 88'	Report	Zahavi 45+1'; Dasa (yellow card) 81'; Itzhaki (yellow card) 90+4'	Stadium: Teddy Stadium; Attendance: 23,000; Referee: Menashe Mashiah

12 September 2015 3	Ironi Kiryat Shmona	1–1	Maccabi Tel Aviv	Kiryat Shmona
20:50	Fernandes 20'	Report	Garcia (yellow card) 55'; Alberman 72'	Stadium: Kiryat Shmona Stadium; Referee: Ziv Adler

20 September 2015 4	Maccabi Tel Aviv	1–2	Hapoel Ra'anana	Tel Aviv
20:15	Alberman (yellow card) 60'; Ben Haim DF (yellow card) 67'; Itzhaki 88'		Kangwa 32'; Babayev (yellow card) 55'; Yanko (yellow card) 79'; Shuker 90'	Stadium: Bloomfield

26 September 2015 5	Maccabi Haifa	0–2	Maccabi Tel Aviv	Haifa
20:00	Obraniak (yellow card) 2'; Menahem (yellow card) 87'; Meshumar (yellow card) 90'	report	Dasa (yellow card) 16'; García (yellow card) 57'; Tibi (yellow card) 70'; Ben Basat 82'; Peretz 90+3'	Stadium: Sammy Ofer; Attendance: 29 544; Referee: Eli Hacmon

3 October 2015 6	Maccabi Tel Aviv	5–0	Hapoel Acre	Tel Aviv
21:00	Kopitović 2' (o.g.); Alberman (yellow card) 59'; Itzhaki 67'; Zahavi 69', 85'; Ben Haim FW 85'		Tzemah (yellow card) 87'	Stadium: Bloomfield

17 October 2015 7	Maccabi Petah Tikva	1–2	Maccabi Tel Aviv	Petah Tikva
20:00	Mununga (yellow card) 2'; Melamed 30'; Panka (yellow card) 84'		García (yellow card) 2' (goal) 20'; Ben Haim FW (yellow card) 64'; Zahavi 80' (pen.); Rikan (yellow card) 84'; Lifshitz (red card) 86'	Stadium: HaMoshava

26 October 2015 8	Maccabi Tel Aviv	2–4	Beitar Jerusalem	Tel Aviv
20:55	Rikan (yellow card) 7'; Zahavi 32', 39'		Rukavytsya 17', 45+1', 57'; Claudemir (yellow card) 37'; Einbinder (yellow card) 47'; Cohen 65'	Stadium: Bloomfield

31 October 2015 9	Hapoel Tel Aviv	0–1	Maccabi Tel Aviv	Tel Aviv
18:00	Reichert (yellow card) 38'; Pintilii (yellow card) 45'		Peretz (yellow card) 25'; Ben Haim FW (yellow card) 32'; Rikan (yellow card) 42'; García 86'	Stadium: Bloomfield

7 November 2015 10	Maccabi Tel Aviv	2–1	Maccabi Netanya	Tel Aviv
20:00	Zahavi 4' (pen.); Peretz (yellow card) 29'; Ben Harush (yellow card) 54'; Ben Haim FW 68'; García (yellow card) 81'		Smiljanić (yellow card) 29'; Romário (yellow card) 74'; Mischenko 90+2'	Stadium: Bloomfield

21 November 2015 11	Hapoel Haifa	0–3	Maccabi Tel Aviv	Haifa
17:00	Dabour (yellow card) 21'; Pinheiro (yellow card) 49'; Malul (red card) 51'		Zahavi 50' (pen.); Igiebor 68'; Rikan 77'	Stadium: Sammy Ofer

29 November 2015 12	Maccabi Tel Aviv	4–0	Bnei Yehuda Tel Aviv	Netanya
20:55	Azulay 55'; Zahavi 69', 75'; Ben Haim 85'; Ben Harush (yellow card) 90'		Kandil (yellow card) 51'	Stadium: Netanya

5 December 2015 13	Hapoel Kfar Saba	0–0	Maccabi Tel Aviv	Kfar Saba
20:00	Shitrit (yellow card) 90+1'			Stadium: Levita

14 December 2015 14	Bnei Sakhnin	0–2	Maccabi Tel Aviv	Sakhnin
20:30	Khalaila (yellow card) 41'		Zahavi 13', 54'; Igiebor (yellow card) 42'; Alberman (yellow card) 63'; Ben Haim FW (yellow card) 88'	Stadium: Doha

21 December 2015 15	Maccabi Tel Aviv	1–2	Hapoel Be'er Sheva	Tel Aviv
21:00	Igiebor (yellow card) 49'; Ben Haim FW (yellow card) 49'; Dasa (yellow card) 58' (goal) 84'; García (yellow card) 62'; Itzhaki (yellow card) 66'		Barda 3' (yellow card) 61'; Tzedek (yellow card) 31'; Melikson 39'; Turjeman (yellow card) 66'; Ogu (yellow card) 86'	Stadium: Bloomfield

27 December 2015 16	Maccabi Tel Aviv	5–0	Ironi Kiryat Shmona	Tel Aviv
20:55	Zahavi 15', 33', 68', 87'; Mitrović (yellow card) 39'; Ben Harush 71'		Shukrani (yellow card) 64'; Brown (yellow card) 75'	Stadium: Bloomfield

2 January 2016 17	Hapoel Ra'anana	0–2	Maccabi Tel Aviv	Netanya
17:00	Tiram (yellow card) 50'; Nimni (yellow card) 89'		Zahavi 22'; Ben Harush (yellow card) 25'; Rikan 59' (yellow card) 89'; Itzhaki (yellow card) 78'; Alberman (yellow card) 88'	Stadium: Netanya; Attendance: 4,000

10 January 2016 18	Maccabi Tel Aviv	2–1	Maccabi Haifa	Tel Aviv
20:55	Zahavi 32'; Ben Haim FW 36'; García (yellow card) 68'		Habshi (yellow card) 24'; Obraniak (yellow card) 65'; Benayoun 70'	Stadium: Bloomfield

18 January 2016 19	Hapoel Acre	0–3	Maccabi Tel Aviv	Acre
20:00	Obieda (red card) 5'		Ben Haim FW 43' (yellow card) 56'; Igiebor 70'; Azulay 82'	Stadium: Acre Municipal Stadium

23 January 2016 20	Maccabi Tel Aviv	3–1	Maccabi Petah Tikva	Tel Aviv
20:00	Zahavi 17' (66); Igiebor 22'; Ben Haim DF (yellow card) 29'; Dasa (yellow card) 73'		Hugi 44'; Danino (yellow card) 52'; Kanyuk (yellow card) 72'; Twito (yellow card) 89'	Stadium: Bloomfield

1 February 2016 21	Beitar Jerusalem	2–2	Maccabi Tel Aviv	Jerusalem
21:00	Atzili 35'; Keltjens 48'; Kachila (yellow card) 77'		Spungin (yellow card) 17'; Zahavi 24', 70'; Azulay (yellow card) 80'; Yitzhaki (yellow card) 90'; Igiebor (red card) 90+2'	Stadium: Teddy; Attendance: 19,000

7 February 2016 22	Maccabi Tel Aviv	1–1	Hapoel Tel Aviv	Tel Aviv
	Micha 24'; Ben Harush (yellow card) 83'; García (yellow card) 89'		Schoenfeld 2'; Barry (yellow card) 36'; Vyntra (yellow card) 78'; Yehezkel (yellow card) 83'	Stadium: Bloomfield

14 February 2016 23	Maccabi Netanya	1–3	Maccabi Tel Aviv	Petah Tikva
	Smiljanić (yellow card) 44'; Lugasi (yellow card) 47'; Benbenishti 49'; Harush (yellow card) 75'; Hassan (yellow card) 83'		Ben Basat 13'; Zahavi 61'; Medunjanin (yellow card) 66'; Ben Haim FW 84'	Stadium: HaMoshava

20 February 2016 24	Maccabi Tel Aviv	2–1	Hapoel Haifa	Tel Aviv
17:45	Zahavi 71' (pen.); Ben Haim FW 80'		Baha (yellow card) 40'; Kijanskas (yellow card) 70'; Serdal (yellow card) 72'	Stadium: Bloomfield; Attendance: 11,900

27 February 2016 25	Bnei Yehuda Tel Aviv	0–1	Maccabi Tel Aviv	Tel Aviv
19:30	Dasa 30'; Ben Haim (yellow card) 89'; Rajković (yellow card) 89'			Stadium: Bloomfield

5 March 2016 26	Maccabi Tel Aviv	5–0	Hapoel Kfar Saba	Tel Aviv
17:45	Micha 3'; Sá 32', 47'; Ben Haim FW (yellow card) 57'; Zahavi 58' (pen.); Peretz (yellow card) 74'; Itzhaki 88'		Cohen (yellow card) 78'	Stadium: Bloomfield

==== Regular season table ====
Pos	Team	Pld	W	D	L	GF	GA	GD	Pts	Qualification or relegation
1	Hapoel Be'er Sheva	26	20	4	2	48	17	+31	64	Qualification for the championship round
2	Maccabi Tel Aviv	26	19	4	3	59	20	+39	61	Qualification for the championship round
3	Beitar Jerusalem	26	15	6	5	38	19	+19	51	Qualification for the championship round
4	Maccabi Haifa	26	10	8	8	33	25	+8	38	Qualification for the championship round
5	Bnei Sakhnin	26	10	6	10	32	25	+7	36	Qualification for the championship round

Source: Israel Football Association, Soccerway
Rules for classification: 1) Points; 2) Goal difference; 3) Matches won; 4) Goals scored; 5) Head-to-head points; 6) Head-to-head goal difference; 7) Head-to-head goals scored; 8) Play-off.

=== Play-off ===
12 March 2016 27	Maccabi Tel Aviv	1–0	Bnei Sakhnin	Tel Aviv
17:00	Sá (yellow card) 37'; Zahavi 80' (yellow card) 81'		Kanadil (yellow card) 35'	Stadium: Bloomfield Stadium

20 March 2016 28	Hapoel Be'er Sheva	1–1	Maccabi Tel Aviv	Be'er Sheva
20:55	Hoban 24'		García 10'	Stadium: Turner Stadium

3 April 2016 29	Maccabi Tel Aviv	3–0	Hapoel Ra'anana	Tel Aviv
	Zahavi 7' (pen.); Sá (yellow card) 12'; Spungin (yellow card) 29'; Ben Haim FW 67' (yellow card) 78'; Medunjanin 78'; García (yellow card) 85'		Vehaba (yellow card) 41'	Stadium: Bloomfield Stadium

11 April 2016 30	Maccabi Tel Aviv	3–2	Beitar Jerusalem	Tel Aviv
20:55	Micha 10'; Zahavi 42', 90'; Dasa (yellow card) 89'		Rukavytsya 21' (pen.), 60'; Keltjens (yellow card) 51'; Klaiman (yellow card) 87'	Stadium: Bloomfield Stadium

17 April 2016 31	Maccabi Haifa	0–0	Maccabi Tel Aviv	Haifa
20:55	Romário (yellow card) 9'; Lavi (yellow card) 11'; Keinan (yellow card) 50'		Rajković (yellow card) 49'; Micha (yellow card) 82'	Stadium: Sammy Ofer Stadium

25 April 2016 32	Bnei Sakhnin	0–0	Maccabi Tel Aviv	Sakhnin
	Khalaila (yellow card) 47'		García (yellow card) 40'; Itzhaki (yellow card) 57'; Zahavi (yellow card) 69'; Dasa (yellow card) 76'	Stadium: Doha Stadium

2 May 2016 33	Maccabi Tel Aviv	0–0	Hapoel Be'er Sheva	Tel Aviv
20:55	Alberman (yellow card) 60'		Barda (yellow card) 87'	Stadium: Bloomfield Stadium; Attendance: 13,500

9 May 2016 34	Hapoel Ra'anana	1–1	Maccabi Tel Aviv	Netanya
20:55	Mihelič (yellow card) 44'; Badash 60'; Yanko (yellow card) 76'; Shaban (yellow card) 90'		Igiebor 58'; Zahavi (yellow card) 64'; Dasa (yellow card) 90'	Stadium: Netanya Stadium

14 May 2016 35	Beitar Jerusalem	0–2	Maccabi Tel Aviv	Jerusalem
19:45	Einbinder (yellow card) 33'; Jesús Rueda (red card) 57'		Zahavi 59' (pen.); Azulay (yellow card) 78'; Medunjanin 89'	Stadium: Teddy Stadium

21 May 2016 36	Maccabi Tel Aviv	6–0	Maccabi Haifa	Tel Aviv
21:00	Zahavi 28', 48' (pen.), 61'; Ben Haim 57'; Rikan (yellow card) 59'; García 63'; Medunjanin 66'			Stadium: Bloomfield Stadium

==== Championship round table ====
Pos	Team	Pld	W	D	L	GF	GA	GD	Pts	Qualification
1	Hapoel Be'er Sheva (C)	36	25	8	3	66	24	+42	83	Qualification for the Champions League second qualifying round
2	Maccabi Tel Aviv	36	24	9	3	76	24	+52	81	Qualification for the Europa League first qualifying round
3	Beitar Jerusalem (Note: Beitar Jerusalem deducted two points because of racial slurs by their fans.)	36	18	6	12	46	37	+9	58	Qualification for the Europa League first qualifying round
4	Maccabi Haifa	36	14	11	11	45	42	+3	53	Qualification for the Europa League second qualifying round (Note: Maccabi Haifa qualified for the Europa League second qualifying round by winning the 2015–16 Israel State Cup.)
5	Bnei Sakhnin	36	13	9	14	46	40	+6	48	
6	Hapoel Ra'anana	36	11	9	16	38	48	−10	42	

Source: Israel Football Association, Soccerway
Rules for classification: 1) Points; 2) Goal difference; 3) Matches won; 4) Goals scored; 5) Head-to-head points; 6) Head-to-head goal difference; 7) Head-to-head goals scored; 8) Play-off.
(C) Champions

== Israel State Cup ==
14 January 2015 Eighth round	Hapoel Nir Ramat HaSharon	1–3	Maccabi Tel Aviv	Ramat HaSharon
21:00	Zur (yellow card) 9'; Netzer (yellow card) 49'; Shivhon 67' (pen.); Tchalisher (yellow card) 79'		Itzhaki 11'; Ziv (yellow card) 67'; Ben Basat 71'; Zahavi 80' (pen.)	Stadium: Grundman Stadium

28 January 2015 Round of 16	Hapoel Rishon LeZion	1–2	Maccabi Tel Aviv	Rishon LeZion
21:00	Abu Alhija 22'; Bachar (yellow card) 37'; Strool (yellow card) 97'; Berihon (yellow card) 100'		Ben Basat (yellow card) 63'; Sá 74'; Alberman (yellow card) 96'; Zahavi 101'; Ben Harush (red card) 104'	Stadium: Haberfeld Stadium

10 February 2016 Quarter final first leg	Hapoel Kfar Saba	0–3	Maccabi Tel Aviv	Kfar Saba
21:00	Škvorc (yellow card) 41'		Medunjanin 33'; Ben Basat 55'; Igeibor (yellow card) 56'; Micha 89'	Stadium: Levita Stadium

1 March 2016 Quarter final second leg	Maccabi Tel Aviv	2–0	Hapoel Kfar Saba	Tel Aviv
21:00	Azulay 23'; Ben Basat 45' (pen.) (yellow card) 74'; Peretz (yellow card) 68'			Stadium: Bloomfield Stadium

21 April 2016 semi final	Maccabi Tel Aviv	3–2	Bnei Sakhnin	Haifa
20:30	Itzhaki 27'; Zahavi 67' (pen.); Ben Haim FW 85'		Mugrabi 23' (yellow card) 30'; Abukasis (red card) 30'; Wanderson (yellow card) 49'; Azulay 52'; Khalaila (yellow card) 67'; Sagas (yellow card) 78'	Stadium: Sammy Ofer Stadium

24 May 2016 final	Maccabi Tel Aviv	0–1	Maccabi Haifa	Jerusalem
20:50	Micha (yellow card) 32'		Obraniak 36' (yellow card) 56'; Keinan (yellow card) 46'	Stadium: Teddy Stadium

== Israel Super Cup ==
14 August 2015	Maccabi Tel Aviv	2–2 (4–5 p)	Ironi Kiryat Shmona	Netanya
20:50	Zahavi 70', 103'		Gutiérrez (yellow card) 59' (yellow-red card); Maimoni 73'; Abed 115'	Stadium: Netanya; Attendance: 7,000; Referee: Oral Greenfeld
	Penalties
	Zahavi (penalty missed); Ben Haim (penalty scored); Ben Haim II (penalty scored); Azulay (penalty scored); Itzhaki (penalty scored); Micha (penalty missed)		(penalty missed) Abed; (penalty scored) Kassio; (penalty scored) Shamir; (penalty scored) Maimoni; (penalty scored) Brown; (penalty scored) Balilti

== Toto Cup ==
=== Group C ===
Pos	Team	Pld	W	D	L	GF	GA	GD	Pts	MPT	BnY	MTA	HTA
1	Maccabi Petah Tikva (A)	3	3	0	0	9	2	+7	9		3–0		
2	Bnei Yehuda (A)	3	2	0	1	5	4	+1	6			3–1	2–0
3	Maccabi Tel Aviv	3	1	0	2	4	7	−3	3	0–3			
4	Hapoel Tel Aviv	3	0	0	3	3	8	−5	0	2–3		1–3	

Updated to match(es) played on 28 October 2015. Source: football.org.il (in Hebrew)
Rules for classification: 1st points; 2nd goal difference; 3rd matches won; 4th goals scored; 5th head-to-head; 6th decision match
(A) Advanced to the quarter finals

1 August 2015 1	Hapoel Tel Aviv	1–3	Maccabi Tel Aviv	Tel Aviv
21:00	Abu Abaid 49'		Igiebor 67'; Zahavi 71'; Ben Haim FW 81'	Stadium: Bloomfield

10 August 2015 2	Maccabi Tel Aviv	0–3	Maccabi Petah Tikva	Tel Aviv
20:50	Ziv (red card) 69'		Tomas 30'; Hugi 36'; Jakobovich 90+4'	Stadium: Bloomfield

28 October 2015 3	Bnei Yehuda Tel Aviv	3–1	Maccabi Tel Aviv	Tel Aviv
20:30	Buzaglo 8'; Agayov 25'; Kadousi 63'		Ben Basat 89'	Stadium: Bloomfield
