= 2016–17 Hapoel Ironi Kiryat Shmona F.C. season =

Hapoel Ironi Kiryat Shmona F.C.
2016–17 season
- Chairman: Izzy Sheratzky
- Manager: Motti Ivanir; Benny Ben Zaken; Tomer Kashtan
- Israeli Premier League: 7th
- State Cup: Quarter-finals
- Toto Cup: Final
- Top goalscorer: League: Ahmed Abed (8); All: Ahmed Abed (9)
Home colours	Away colours

The 2016–17 Hapoel Ironi Kiryat Shmona season was the club's 17th season since its establishment in 2000, and 7th straight season in the Israeli Premier League since promoting from Liga Leumit in 2009–10.

During the 2016–17 campaign the club have competed in the Israeli Premier League, State Cup, Toto Cup.

== Season review ==
After winning just one match of the first eight matches of the season, manager Motti Ivanir was sacked and was replaced by the coach of the U-21 team, Benny Ben Zaken. Ben Zaken himself was replaced following a disagreement with chairmen Izzy Sheratzky over the inclusion of Ahmed Abed in the line-up, with Sheratzky announcing the sacking of Ben Zaken on live radio during the team's match against Hapoel Ashkelon. Ben Zaken was replaced by Tomer Kashtan.

By the end of the regular season, the team failed to secure its place in the championship playoffs, falling from 6th to 7th in the last match of the regular season. In the relegation playoffs, the team managed to score only four points, though never dropping below 7th place, while allowing some youth players to get their first taste of league football.

== Match results ==
=== Legend ===
Win	Draw	Loss

=== League ===
Pos	Team	Pld	W	D	L	GF	GA	GD	Pts	Qualification or relegation
5	Bnei Sakhnin	26	10	9	7	26	26	0	39	Qualification for the Championship round
6	Maccabi Haifa	26	10	8	8	30	25	+5	38	Qualification for the Championship round
7	Ironi Kiryat Shmona	26	9	8	9	35	33	+2	35	Qualification for the Relegation round
8	Hapoel Haifa	26	8	4	14	29	36	−7	28	Qualification for the Relegation round
9	F.C. Ashdod	26	6	10	10	15	26	−11	28	Qualification for the Relegation round

Source: Israel Football Association, Soccerway

Pos	Team	Pld	W	D	L	GF	GA	GD	Pts	Relegation
7	Ironi Kiryat Shmona	33	10	9	14	44	48	−4	39	
8	Hapoel Haifa	33	10	7	16	39	46	−7	37	
9	F.C. Ashdod	33	7	15	11	22	32	−10	36	
10	Hapoel Ra'anana	33	9	9	15	22	40	−18	36	
11	Bnei Yehuda (Q)	33	8	11	14	26	39	−13	35	Qualification for the Europa League second qualifying round (Note: Bnei Yehuda qualified for the Europa League Second qualifying round by winning the 2016–17 Israel State Cup)
12	Hapoel Ashkelon	33	7	11	15	24	42	−18	32	
13	Hapoel Kfar Saba (R)	33	7	10	16	23	40	−17	31	Relegation to Liga Leumit
14	Hapoel Tel Aviv (Note: Hapoel Tel Aviv were deducted nine points for entering administration.) (R)	33	8	14	11	29	34	−5	29	Relegation to Liga Leumit

Source: Israel Football Association, Soccerway
(Q) Qualified for the phase indicated; (R) Relegated
Notes:

Date	Opponent	Venue	Result	Scorers	Position
20 August 2016 - 20:00	F.C. Ironi Ashdod	H	1–0	Ahmed Abed	4
28 August 2016 - 20:15	Beitar Jerusalem	A	2–2	Tal Genish (o.g.), Didier Brossou	3
10 September 2016 - 18:00	Hapoel Ra'anana	H	0–0		5
17 September 2016 - 18:00	Hapoel Tel Aviv	A	3–3	Marko Simić (o.g.), Ezechiel N'Douassel, Shlomi Yosef Azulai	7
24 September 2016 - 18:00	Bnei Sakhnin	H	2–2	Shlomi Azulai, Ahmed Abed	6
1 October 2016 - 18:00	Maccabi Haifa	A	0–0		7
24 October 2016 - 19:30	Hapoel Be'er Sheva	H	0–2		7
30 October 2016 - 19:00	Maccabi Petah Tikva	A	1–2	Heitor	10
5 November 2016 - 16:00	Bnei Yehuda	A	1–0	Shlomi Azulai	6
20 November 2016 - 20:15	Maccabi Tel Aviv	H	1–2	Ezechiel N'Douassel	7
26 November 2016 - 2015	Hapoel Ashkelon	H	4–1	Shlomi Yosef Azulai, Shlomi Azulai, Eden Shamir, Ahmed Abed	6
3 December 2016 - 16:00	Hapoel Haifa	H	2–0	Shlomi Yosef Azulai, Ahmed Abed	6
10 December 2016 - 18:00	Hapoel Kfar Saba	A	2–2	Mauricio, Ido Davidov	5
17 December 2016 - 18:00	F.C. Ironi Ashdod	A	0–0		5
24 December 2016 - 20:30	Beitar Jerusalem	H	2–0	Ahmed Abed, Mauricio	5
31 December 2016 - 18:00	Hapoel Ra'anana	A	3–0	Ezechiel N'Douassel, Shlomi Yosef Azulai, Shlomi Azulai	5
12 January 2017 - 20:00	Hapoel Tel Aviv	H	2–1	Ofir Kriaf, Ahmed Abed	4
16 January 2017 - 18:30	Bnei Sakhnin	A	2–5	Shlomi Azulai, Ahmed Abed	4
21 January 2017 - 16:00	Maccabi Haifa	H	3–0	Ofir Kriaf, Shlomi Azulai, Shlomi Yosef Azulai	4
28 January 2017 - 18:15	Hapoel Be'er Sheva	A	0–2		4
4 February 2017 - 16:00	Maccabi Petah Tikva	H	0–1		4
11 February 2017 - 18:00	Bnei Yehuda	H	0–1		6
18 February 2017 - 20:35	Maccabi Tel Aviv	A	0–3		7
25 February 2017 - 18:00	Hapoel Ashkelon	A	1–1	Shoval Gozlan	6
4 March 2017 - 16:00	Hapoel Haifa	A	2–1	Shoval Gozlan (2)	6
11 March 2017 - 20:30	Hapoel Kfar Saba	H	1–2	Oded Elkayam	7
18 March 2017 - 16:00	Hapoel Tel Aviv	H	2–3	Eden Shamir, Yogev Lerman	7
1 April 2017 - 18:00	Hapoel Haifa	H	0–2		7
9 April 2017 - 19:00	F.C. Ironi Ashdod	A	1–1	Shoval Gozlan	7
22 April 2017 - 20:15	Hapoel Ra'anana	H	2–3	Shlomi Azulai, Shoval Gozlan	7
27 April 2017 - 19:30	Bnei Yehuda	A	2–0	Ahmed Abed, Shoval Gozlan	7
6 May 2017 - 19:00	Hapoel Kfar Saba	H	1–4	Shlomi Yosef Azulai	7
13 May 2017 - 20:30	Hapoel Ashkelon	A	1–2	Oded Elkayam	7

=== State Cup ===
Date	Round	Opponent	Venue	Result	Scorers
6 January 2017 - 13:00	8th round	Hapoel Hod HaSharon	A	1–0 (a.e.t.)	Mauricio
24 January 2017 - 20:55	Round of 16	Hapoel Be'er Sheva	A	2–1	Mauricio (2)
7 February 2017 - 21:10	Quarter-final (1st leg)	Beitar Jerusalem	A	0–2	
1 March 2017 - 20:00	Quarter-final (2nd leg)	Beitar Jerusalem	H	1–0	Mauricio

=== Toto Cup ===
Pos	Team	Pld	W	D	L	GF	GA	GD	Pts	Qualification or relegation
1	Maccabi Haifa	4	3	1	0	6	3	+3	10	Qualified to Quarter-finals
2	Hapoel Haifa	4	1	2	1	5	4	+1	5	Qualified to Quarter-finals
3	Hapoel Kiryat Shmona	4	0	4	0	2	2	0	4	Qualified to Quarter-finals
4	Bnei Sakhnin	4	0	3	1	4	5	−1	3	
5	Hapoel Kfar Saba	4	0	2	2	2	5	−3	2	

Updated to match(es) played on 16 August 2016. Source: Israel Football Association
Rules for classification: 1) points; 2) goal difference; 3) number of wins; 4) goals scored; 5) head to head; 6)deciding match.

Date	Round	Opponent	Venue	Result	Scorers
30 July 2016 - 20:00	Group	Maccabi Haifa	H	0–0	
2 August 2016 - 20:15	Group	Bnei Sakhnin	A	1–1	Oded Elkayam
6 August 2016 - 20:15	Group	Hapoel Kfar Saba	H	0–0	
9 August 2016 - 19:15	Group	Hapoel Haifa	A	1–1	Mauricio
27 October 2016 - 21:00	Quarter-final (1st leg)	Maccabi Tel Aviv	A	2–3	Ezechiel N'Douassel, Ofir Kriaf
30 November 2016 - 21:00	Quarter-final (2nd leg)	Maccabi Tel Aviv	A	1–0	Ahmed Abed
14 December 2016 - 20:30	Semi-final	F.C. Ironi Ashdod	N	1–0 (a.e.t.)	Shlomi Yosef Azulai
28 December 2016 - 20:00	Final	Hapoel Be'er Sheva	N	1–4	Ben Turjeman (o.g.)

== Player details ==
List of squad players, including number of appearances by competition

No.	Pos	Nat	Player	Total		Premier League		State Cup		Toto Cup	
No.	Pos	Nat	Player	Apps	Goals	Apps	Goals	Apps	Goals	Apps	Goals
1	GK	(Israel) ISR	Itamar Nitzan	39	0	28	0	4	0	7	0
45	GK	(Israel) ISR	Mahadi Zuabi	6	0	5	0	0	0	1	0
2	DF	(Israel) ISR	Idan Nahmias	1	0	1	0	0	0	0	0
4	DF	(Brazil) BRA	Heitor	10	1	7	1	0	0	3	0
6	DF	(Israel) ISR	Amir Nassar	30	0	22	0	3	0	5	0
12	DF	(Israel) ISR	Oren Biton	36	0	28	0	4	0	4	0
14	DF	(Israel) ISR	Oded Elkayam	29	3	22	2	3	0	4	1
15	DF	(Israel) ISR	Eli Balilti	9	0	2	0	0	0	7	0
17	DF	(Israel) ISR	Bar Hillel	6	0	6	0	0	0	0	0
23	DF	(Israel) ISR	Yogev Lerman	30	1	20	1	3	0	7	0
26	DF	(Israel) ISR	Dean Maimoni	34	0	25	0	3	0	6	0
3	MF	(Brazil) BRA	Kassio	29	0	20	0	2	0	7	0
5	MF	(Israel) ISR	Nizar Abu Ktifan	4	0	4	0	0	0	0	0
7	MF	(Israel) ISR	Ahmed Abed	38	9	28	8	3	0	7	1
8	MF	(Israel) ISR	Ido Davidov	16	1	7	1	1	0	8	0
8	MF	(Israel) ISR	Shlomi Yosef Azulay	33	7	28	6	2	0	3	1
10	MF	(Israel) ISR	Ofir Kriaf	38	3	26	2	4	0	8	1
16	MF	(Israel) ISR	Omer Tchalisher	35	0	24	0	4	0	7	0
18	MF	(Israel) ISR	Eden Shamir	36	2	24	2	4	0	8	0
19	MF	(Israel) ISR	Josef Ganda	9	0	3	0	1	0	5	0
21	MF	(Brazil) BRA	Rafael Jataí	8	0	5	0	0	0	3	0
22	MF	(Nigeria) NGR	Malachy Ilo	1	0	0	0	0	0	1	0
22	MF	(Israel) ISR	Omer Lakau	2	0	2	0	0	0	0	0
25	MF	(Israel) ISR	Eden Dahan	1	0	1	0	0	0	0	0
28	MF	(Ivory Coast) CIV	Didier Brossou	37	1	28	1	3	0	6	0
9	FW	(Brazil) BRA	Mauricio	36	7	25	2	4	4	7	1
11	FW	(Israel) ISR	Shlomi Azulay	39	7	30	7	3	0	6	0
15	FW	(Israel) ISR	Anas Mahamid	3	0	3	0	0	0	0	0
19	FW	(Israel) ISR	Rotem Hatuel	1	0	1	0	0	0	0	0
21	FW	(Israel) ISR	Shoval Gozlan	15	6	13	6	2	0	0	0
24	FW	(Israel) ISR	Ofir Takiar	3	0	1	0	0	0	2	0
27	FW	(Nigeria) NGR	Jacob Njuko	13	0	10	0	3	0	0	0
29	FW	(Chad) CHA	Ezechiel N'Douassel	15	4	11	3	0	0	4	1

== Transfers ==
=== In ===
No.	Pos.	Nation	Player
—	GK	ISR	Itamar Nitzan (loan return from (Israel) Maccabi Petah Tikva)
—	DF	ISR	Yogev Hazuharoui (from (Israel) Hapoel Katamon Jerusalem)
—	DF	ISR	Eli Balilty (loan return from (Israel) Hapoel Afula)
—	DF	ISR	Oren Biton (from (Israel) Hapoel Haifa, previously loaned to (Israel) Hapoel Nazareth Illit)
—	DF	BRA	Heidor (from (Brazil) Tupi)
—	MF	CIV	Didier Brossou (from (Israel) Hapoel Ramat Gan)
—	MF	ISR	Ido Davidov (from (Israel) Hapoel Nir Ramat HaSharon)
—	MF	ISR	Ofir Kriaf (from (Israel) Maccabi Haifa)
—	MF	ISR	Rafael Jataí (from (Brazil) Tupi)
—	MF	ISR	Shlomi Azulay (on loan from (Israel) Maccabi Tel Aviv)
—	FW	BRA	Mauricio (loan return from (Israel) F.C. Ashdod)
—	FW	ISR	Shlomi Azulay (from (Israel) Bnei Sakhnin)
—	FW	ISR	Ofir Takiar (loan return from (Israel) Hapoel Afula)
—	FW	CHA	Ezechiel N'Douassel (from (Tunisia) Sfaxien)
—	FW	NGR	Jacob Njoku (from (Israel) Beitar Tel Aviv Ramla)
—	FW	ISR	Shoval Gozlan (on loan from (Israel) Maccabi Haifa)
—	FW	ISR	Anas Mahamid (from (Israel) Hapoel Tel Aviv)

=== Out ===
No.	Pos.	Nation	Player
—	GK	ISR	Guy Haimov (to (Israel) Hapoel Be'er Sheva)
—	GK	ISR	Ofek Antman (on loan to (Israel) Ironi Nesher)
—	DF	ISR	Eran Azrad (on loan to (Israel) Hapoel Afula)
—	DF	ISR	Oz Raly (to (Israel) Beitar Jerusalem, previously loaned from (Israel) Bnei Yehuda)
—	DF	ISR	Daniel Borchal (to (Israel) Hapoel Acre)
—	MF	LTU	Rokas Stanulevičius (on loan to (Israel) Hapoel Nazareth Illit)
—	MF	ISR	Naor Abudi (on loan to (Israel) Ironi Nesher)
—	MF	ISR	Dan Cohen (to (Israel) Ironi Beit Dagan)
—	MF	ISR	Roei Shukrani (to (Israel) Hapoel Ra'anana)
—	MF	ISR	Or Ostvind (to (Israel) Hapoel Nir Ramat HaSharon)
—	FW	ISR	Ofir Mizrahi (on loan to (Switzerland) FC Lugano)
—	FW	BRA	Bruno Cantanhede (on loan to (Portugal) Tondela)
—	FW	NGR	Austin Amutu (on loan to (Turkey) Yeni Malatyaspor)
—	FW	NGR	Anthony Lukusa (to (Israel) Beitar Tel Aviv Ramla)
—	DF	BRA	Heitor (to (Brazil) Fortaleza)
—	DF	ISR	Eli Balilty (on loan to (Israel) Hapoel Afula)
—	MF	BRA	Rafael Jataí (to (Brazil) América Mineiro)
—	MF	ISR	Shaked Shemo (to (Israel) Hapoel Nazareth Illit)
—	MF	ISR	Ido Davidov (on loan to (Israel) F.C. Ashdod)
—	FW	CHA	Ezechiel N'Douassel (to (Israel) Hapoel Tel Aviv)

== See also ==
- List of Hapoel Ironi Kiryat Shmona F.C. seasons
