= 2014–15 FC Dynamo Moscow season =

Russian association football club season

Dynamo Moscow
2014–15 season
- Chairman: Boris Rotenberg Sr.
- Manager: Stanislav Cherchesov
- Stadium: Arena Khimki
- Russian Premier League: 4th
- Russian Cup: Round of 32 vs Shinnik Yaroslavl
- Europa League: Round of 16 vs Napoli
- Top goalscorer: League: Kevin Kurányi (10); All: Kevin Kurányi (15)
- Highest home attendance: 17,356 vs Napoli; 19 March 2015
- Lowest home attendance: 3,520 vs Rostov; 3 August 2014
- Average home league attendance: 8,126; 30 May 2015
Home colours	Away colours

The 2014–15 Dynamo Moscow season was the 92nd season in FC Dynamo Moscow's history. They participated in the Russian Premier League, Russian Cup and the Europa League.

== Squad ==
Note: Flags indicate national team as defined under FIFA eligibility rules; some limited exceptions apply. Players may hold more than one non-FIFA nationality.

No.	Pos.	Nation	Player
1	GK	RUS	Anton Shunin
2	DF	RUS	Grigori Morozov
3	DF	NED	Alexander Büttner
4	DF	CGO	Christopher Samba
5	DF	NED	Douglas
6	MF	FRA	William Vainqueur
7	MF	HUN	Balázs Dzsudzsák
8	MF	RUS	Artur Yusupov
9	FW	RUS	Aleksandr Kokorin
11	MF	RUS	Aleksei Ionov

No.	Pos.	Nation	Player
14	FW	FRA	Mathieu Valbuena
15	DF	SVK	Tomáš Hubočan
18	MF	RUS	Yuri Zhirkov
21	GK	ARM	Roman Berezovsky
22	FW	GER	Kevin Kurányi
25	DF	RUS	Aleksei Kozlov
27	MF	RUS	Igor Denisov
28	DF	RUS	Boris Rotenberg
30	GK	RUS	Vladimir Gabulov
47	MF	RUS	Roman Zobnin

=== Out on loan ===
Note: Flags indicate national team as defined under FIFA eligibility rules; some limited exceptions apply. Players may hold more than one non-FIFA nationality.

No. / Pos. / Nation / Player; 10 / FW / RUS / Fyodor Smolov (at Ural)	No. / Pos. / Nation / Player; 13 / DF / RUS / Vladimir Granat (at Rostov)

=== Reserve squad ===
Note: Flags indicate national team as defined under FIFA eligibility rules; some limited exceptions apply. Players may hold more than one non-FIFA nationality.

No.	Pos.	Nation	Player
34	FW	RUS	Artyom Katashevsky
45	DF	RUS	Artyom Yarmolitsky
58	MF	RUS	Dmitri Vlasov
63	FW	RUS	Aleksandr Maksimenko
67	GK	RUS	Aleksandr Yudin
71	MF	RUS	Igor Gorbunov
72	DF	RUS	Aleksandr Kalyashin
75	MF	RUS	Mikhail Mogulkin
76	DF	RUS	Anton Ivanov
77	MF	RUS	Anatoli Katrich
79	MF	RUS	Aleksandr Morgunov

No.	Pos.	Nation	Player
81	DF	RUS	Yegor Danilkin
82	MF	RUS	Guram Adzhoyev
86	MF	RUS	Vladislav Lyovin
87	MF	RUS	Valeri Saramutin
88	MF	RUS	Aleksandr Tashayev
89	GK	RUS	Igor Leshchuk
90	FW	RUS	Nikolay Obolskiy
92	DF	RUS	Aleksandr Stepanov
94	DF	RUS	Dmitri Zhivoglyadov
96	MF	RUS	Maksim Kuzmin
97	MF	RUS	Anton Altunin

== Transfers ==
=== Summer ===
In: Note: Flags indicate national team as defined under FIFA eligibility rules; some limited exceptions apply. Players may hold more than one non-FIFA nationality.

No.	Pos.	Nation	Player
3	DF	NED	Alexander Büttner (from (England) Manchester United)
6	MF	FRA	William Vainqueur (from (Belgium) Standard Liège)
10	FW	RUS	Fyodor Smolov (end of loan to (Russia) Anzhi Makhachkala)
14	MF	FRA	Mathieu Valbuena (from (France) Marseille)
15	DF	SVK	Tomáš Hubočan (from (Russia) Zenit St.Petersburg)
23	DF	BUL	Stanislav Manolev (from (Russia) Kuban Krasnodar)
61	DF	RUS	Semyon Matviychuk
62	DF	RUS	Nikita Kalugin
64	DF	RUS	Aleksandr Shchegolkov
65	MF	RUS	Daniil Yamshchikov
67	MF	RUS	Pavel Farafonov
68	DF	RUS	Denis Sidnev
69	MF	RUS	Nikita Kireyev
73	DF	RUS	Sergei Yevtushenko
74	DF	RUS	Nikita Klimov
78	FW	RUS	Ruslan Suanov
80	FW	RUS	Vladislav Lyovin
83	GK	RUS	Andrei Rebrikov
84	GK	RUS	Ivan Zirikov
92	FW	RUS	Maksim Obolskiy
98	MF	RUS	Anton Terekhov
99	FW	RUS	Aleksandr Prudnikov (from (Russia) Rubin Kazan)
—	GK	RUS	Stanislav Cherchesov Jr. (from (Russia) Amkar Perm)
—	MF	RUS	Pavel Ignatovich (end of loan to (Russia) Tom Tomsk)
—	MF	UKR	Borys Tashchy (end of loan to (Ukraine) Hoverla Uzhhorod)

Out: Note: Flags indicate national team as defined under FIFA eligibility rules; some limited exceptions apply. Players may hold more than one non-FIFA nationality.

No.	Pos.	Nation	Player
6	DF	ARG	Leandro Fernández (to (Argentina) Newell's Old Boys)
10	MF	UKR	Andriy Voronin (released)
10	FW	RUS	Fyodor Smolov (loan to (Russia) Ural)
11	MF	RUS	Alan Kasaev (end of loan from (Russia) Rubin Kazan)
14	FW	RUS	Pavel Solomatin (on loan to (Russia) Amkar Perm)
17	MF	RUS	Alan Gatagov (released)
21	MF	ROU	George Florescu (to (Romania) Astra Giurgiu)
23	DF	AUS	Luke Wilkshire (to (Netherlands) Feyenoord)
24	FW	RUS	Vladimir Dyadyun (to (Russia) Rubin Kazan)
30	GK	RUS	Yegor Generalov (on loan to (Russia) Saturn Ramenskoye)
32	DF	SRB	Marko Lomić (to (Russia) Mordovia Saransk)
59	MF	RUS	Aleksandr Ilyin (on loan to (Russia) Sakhalin Yuzhno-Sakhalinsk)
61	MF	FIN	Moshtagh Yaghoubi (end of loan from (Latvia) Spartaks Jūrmala)
64	MF	RUS	Vladislav Pavlyuchenko (released)
—	DF	RUS	Vladimir Rykov (to (Russia) Torpedo Moscow, previously on loan to (Russia) Tom Tomsk)
—	MF	RUS	Aleksandr Sapeta (to (Russia) Ural Sverdlovsk Oblast, previously on loan)
—	MF	RUS	Vladimir Sobolev (to (Russia) Rubin Kazan, previously on loan to (Russia) Anzhi Makhachkala)
—	FW	RUS	Andrei Panyukov (on loan to (Russia) Baltika Kaliningrad, previously on loan to (Russia) Spartak Nalchik)

=== Winter ===
In: Note: Flags indicate national team as defined under FIFA eligibility rules; some limited exceptions apply. Players may hold more than one non-FIFA nationality.

No.	Pos.	Nation	Player
85	MF	RUS	Nikita Kanavin
86	MF	RUS	Artyom Malakhov (from (Russia) Metallurg-Oskol Stary Oskol)
89	DF	RUS	Nikolai Mayorsky

Out: Note: Flags indicate national team as defined under FIFA eligibility rules; some limited exceptions apply. Players may hold more than one non-FIFA nationality.

No.	Pos.	Nation	Player
13	DF	RUS	Vladimir Granat (on loan to (Russia) Rostov)
16	MF	ECU	Christian Noboa (to (Greece) PAOK)
23	MF	BUL	Stanislav Manolev (to (Russia) Kuban Krasnodar)
57	DF	RUS	Pavel Derevyagin
78	FW	RUS	Ruslan Suanov (to (Russia) Zenit St. Petersburg)
83	GK	RUS	Andrei Rebrikov
99	FW	RUS	Aleksandr Prudnikov (to (Russia) Amkar Perm)
—	FW	RUS	Andrei Panyukov (on loan to (Lithuania) Atlantas, previously on loan to (Russia) Baltika Kaliningrad)

== Competitions ==
=== Russian Premier League ===
==== Results by round ====
Round	1	2	3	4	5	6	7	8	9	10	11	12	13	14	15	16	17	18	19	20	21	22	23	24	25	26	27	28	29	30
Ground	H	A	A	H	H	A	A	A	H	H	A	H	H	A	A	H	H	A	H	H	A	H	A	A	A	A	H	A	H	H
Result	W	L	W	W	W	W	L	W	D	L	L	W	W	D	W	W	W	L	L	D	W	W	D	D	L	W	D	L	D	D
Position	1	7	5	3	3	2	3	2	3	5	7	6	3	4	4	3	3	3	5	5	4	4	4	4	4	4	4	4	4	4

Updated to match(es) played on 30 May 2015. Source: Russian Premier League
A = Away; H = Home; W = Win; D = Draw; L = Loss

==== Matches ====
3 August 2014 1	Dynamo Moscow	7 – 3	Rostov	Khimki
16:30 MSK (UTC+4)	Kurányi 15' (pen.), 66'; Samba 29'; Dzsudzsák 37'; Kokorin 43' (pen.), 48', 61'; Büttner (yellow card) 49'; Kozlov (yellow card) 86'	Summary	Pletikosa (yellow card) 14'; Kalachev (yellow card) 19'; Poloz 35', 40'; Fatullayev (yellow card) 43'; Dyakov (yellow card) 54'; Gațcan 90'	Stadium: Arena Khimki; Attendance: 3,520; Referee: Mikhail Vilkov

10 August 2014 2	Dynamo Moscow	1 – 2	Spartak Moscow	Khimki
13:30 MSK (UTC+4)	Kokorin 3'; Vainqueur (yellow card) 26'; Douglas (yellow card) 90+3'	Summary	Dzyuba 17', 51' (yellow card) 45+2'; Costa (yellow card) 26'; Källström (yellow card) 73'; Rebrov (yellow card) 86'	Stadium: Arena Khimki; Attendance: 15,351; Referee: Aleksey Eskov

13 August 2014 3	Ufa	0 – 2	Dynamo Moscow	Ufa
15:00 MSK (UTC+4)		Summary	Samba 31'; Kurányi 61'	Stadium: Dynamo Stadium; Attendance: 6,200; Referee: Sergey Lapochkin

17 August 2014 4	Arsenal Tula	1 – 2	Dyanmo Moscow	Tula
16:00 MSK (UTC+4)	Kašćelan (yellow card) 21'; Lyakh (yellow card) 22'; Yershov 47'	Summary	Douglas 32'; Kurányi 45+1'; Valbuena (yellow card) 89'	Stadium: Arsenal Stadium; Attendance: 16,800; Referee: Aleksandr Egorov

24 August 2014 5	Dynamo Moscow	2 – 0	Ural	Khimki
13:30 MSK (UTC+4)	Ionov 20', 41'; Manolev (yellow card) 52'	Summary	Fontanello (yellow card) 34' (yellow-red card) 70'; Berger (yellow card) 41'; Yerokhin (yellow card) 68'	Stadium: Arena Khimki; Attendance: 6,111; Referee: Kirill Levnikov

30 August 2014 6	Krasnodar	0 – 2	Dynamo Moscow	Krasnodar
20:15 MSK (UTC+4)	Sigurðsson (yellow card) 34'; Izmailov (yellow card) 40'	Summary	Valbuena 35'; Samba (yellow card) 45+2'; Noboa 49'; Yusupov (yellow card) 65' (yellow-red card) 67'; Granat (yellow card) 90+4'	Stadium: Kuban Stadium; Attendance: 13,500; Referee: Vitali Meshkov

13 September 2014 7	Zenit St. Petersburg	3 – 2	Dynamo Moscow	Saint Petersburg
18:30 MSK (UTC+4)	Douglas 28' (o.g.); Arshavin 40'; Criscito (yellow card) 48' Danny (yellow card) 81'; Smolnikov 89'	Summary	Douglas (yellow card) 6'; Valbuena 18'; Vainqueur (yellow card) 43'; Samba 82'	Stadium: Petrovsky Stadium; Attendance: 14,012; Referee: Mikhail Vilkov

22 September 2014 8	Torpedo Moscow	1 – 3	Dynamo Moscow	Ramensky District
20:00 MSK (UTC+4)	Katsalapov 12'	Summary	Ionov 10', 83'; Hubočan (yellow card) 11'; Dzsudzsák 90'	Stadium: Saturn Stadium; Attendance: 4,000; Referee: Sergei Ivanov

28 September 2014 9	Dynamo Moscow	2 – 2	Kuban Krasnodar	Khimki
13:30 MSK (UTC+4)	Büttner (yellow card) 8'; Kokorin 20'; Manolev 31'; Yusupov (yellow card) 37'; Vainqueur (yellow card) 81'; Noboa (yellow card) 85'	Summary	Yeshchenko (yellow card) 54'; Ignatyev 55'; Oliseh 60'	Stadium: Arena Khimki; Attendance: 6,638; Referee: Vitali Meshkov

18 October 2014 10	Amkar Perm'	Postponed	Dynamo Moscow	Perm
12:00 MSK (UTC+4)		Summary		Stadium: Zvezda Stadium; Referee: Sergey Lapochkin

27 October 2014 11	Dynamo Moscow	0 – 2	Rubin Kazan'	Khimki
20:30 MSK (UTC+3)	Zhirkov (yellow card) 51'; Büttner (yellow card) 53'	Summary	Kuzmin (yellow card) 12'; Ozdoyev (yellow card) 41' (goal) 48'; Georgiev (yellow card) 68'; Kanunnikov 71' (yellow card) 90'; Ryzhikov (yellow card) 90+3'	Stadium: Arena Khimki; Attendance: 5,137; Referee: Igor Nizovtsev

2 November 2014 12	Lokomotiv Moscow	4 – 2	Dynamo Moscow	Moscow
13:30 MSK (UTC+3)	Mykhalyk (yellow card) 11'; N'Doye (yellow card) 52' (goal) 58'; Samedov 60'; Kasaev 66'; Pavlyuchenko 85'	Summary	Douglas (yellow card) 15'; Ionov 37'; Denisov (yellow card) 43'; Kokorin (yellow card) 45'; Dzsudzsák 50'	Stadium: Lokomotiv Stadium; Attendance: 10,271; Referee: Alexey Nikolaev

9 November 2014 13	Dynamo Moscow	1 – 0	CSKA Moscow	Khimki
13:30 MSK (UTC+3)	Kokorin 54'; Samba (yellow card) 65'; Yusupov (yellow card) 82'; Büttner (yellow card) 86'; Vainqueur (yellow card) 90+2'	Summary	Fernandes (yellow card) 56'; Milanov (yellow card) 87'; Natcho (yellow card) 90+5'	Stadium: Arena Khimki; Attendance: 13,692; Referee: Igor Fedotov

23 November 2014 14	Dynamo Moscow	3 – 0	Terek Grozny	Khimki
13:30 MSK (UTC+3)	Yusupov (yellow card) 16'; Kokorin 26' (yellow card) 53'; Kurányi 29', 86' (pen.); Gabulov (yellow card) 66'; Noboa (yellow card) 82'	Summary	Kudryashov (yellow card) 51'; Semyonov (yellow card) 59'; Ivanov (yellow card) 64'	Stadium: Arena Khimki; Attendance: 4,856; Referee: Sergei Ivanov

30 November 2014 15	Rubin Kazan'	1 – 1	Dynamo Moscow	Kazan
16:00 MSK (UTC+3)	Portnyagin 23'; Kuzmin (yellow card) 39'; Georgiev (yellow card) 58'	Summary	Douglas (yellow card) 18'; Büttner (yellow card) 34'; Valbuena (yellow card) 45+2'; Dzsudzsák 78'; Yusupov (yellow card) 80'	Stadium: Kazan Arena; Attendance: 5,000; Referee: Aleksandr Egorov

4 December 2014 16	Mordovia Saransk	0 – 1	Dynamo Moscow	Saransk
17:45 MSK (UTC+3)	Nakhushev (yellow card) 49'; Perendija (yellow card) 56'; Lomić (yellow card) 82'	Summary	Hubočan 36'	Stadium: Start Stadium; Attendance: 3,967; Referee: Vitali Meshkov

7 December 2014 17	Dynamo Moscow	5 – 0	Amkar Perm'	Khimki
16:00 MSK (UTC+3)	Kurányi 22'; Valbuena 48'; Dzsudzsák 67'; Hubočan (yellow card) 76'; Ionov 81'; Yusupov 88'	Summary	Cherenchikov (yellow card) 86'	Stadium: Arena Khimki; Attendance: 4,105; Referee: Sergey Lapochkin

8 March 2015 18	Dynamo Moscow	3 – 1	Ufa	Khimki
16:00 MSK (UTC+3)	Ionov 10'; Valbuena 19'; Kurányi 72'	Summary	Marcinho 29' (pen.); Zaseyev (yellow card) 63'	Stadium: Arena Khimki; Attendance: 15,000; Referee: Vladimir Moskalyov

15 March 2015 19	Spartak Moscow	1 – 0	Dynamo Moscow	Moscow
13:30 MSK (UTC+3)	Parshivlyuk (yellow card) 11'; Glushakov (yellow card) 44'; Douglas 59' (o.g.); Timofeyev (yellow card) 78'; Kombarov (yellow card) 90+1'	Summary	Kozlov (yellow card) 50'; Zhirkov (yellow card) 87'	Stadium: Otkrytie Arena; Attendance: 37,923; Referee: Alexey Nikolaev

22 March 2015 20	Dynamo Moscow	0 – 1	Zenit St.Petersburg	Khimki
13:30 MSK (UTC+3)		Summary	Smolnikov 17' (yellow card) 34'; Garay (yellow card) 85'	Stadium: Arena Khimki; Attendance: 12,553; Referee: Vitali Meshkov

4 April 2015 21	Dynamo Moscow	2 – 2	Lokomotiv Moscow	Khimki
14:15 MSK (UTC+3)	Rotenberg (yellow card) 39'; Vainqueur 40' (yellow card) 80'; Kurányi 49' (pen.); Denisov (yellow card) 52'; Büttner (yellow card) 76'; Hubočan (yellow card) 76'	Summary	Logashov (yellow card) 17'; Škuletić 44'; Sheshukov (red card) 48'; Guilherme (yellow card) 48'; Ćorluka (yellow card) 49'; Fernandes 79' (pen.); Maicon (yellow card) 90+3'	Stadium: Arena Khimki; Attendance: 7,023; Referee: Vladislav Bezborodov

8 April 2015 22	CSKA Moscow	1 – 2	Dynamo Moscow	Khimki
20:30 MSK (UTC+3)	Milanov 15'; Wernbloom (yellow card) 54'	Summary	Ionov 9'; Dzsudzsák 24'; Zhirkov (yellow card) 86'	Stadium: Arena Khimki; Attendance: 12,000; Referee: Sergey Karasev

12 April 2015 23	Dynamo Moscow	2 – 1	Mordovia Saransk	Khimki
18:30 MSK (UTC+3)	Douglas 42'; Kurányi 45+1'; Rotenberg (yellow card) 73'	Summary	Le Tallec (yellow card) 56'; Danilo 86'	Stadium: Arena Khimki; Attendance: 5,230; Referee: Kirill Levnikov

19 April 2015 24	Terek Grozny	0 – 0	Dynamo Moscow	Grozny
16:00 MSK (UTC+3)	Utsiyev (yellow card) 39'; Ivanov (yellow card) 85'	Summary	Vainqueur (yellow card) 40'	Stadium: Akhmat-Arena; Attendance: 8,100; Referee: Sergey Lapochkin

26 April 2015 25	Rostov	2 – 2	Dynamo Moscow	Rostov-on-Don
16:00 MSK (UTC+3)	Bastos (yellow card) 43' (goal) 80'; Azmoun 51'; Torbinski (yellow card) 73'; Gațcan (yellow card) 90+2'	Summary	Kokorin 21'; Zhirkov (yellow card) 55'; Samba 77'; Valbuena (yellow card) 90+1' Zobnin (yellow card) 90+5'	Stadium: Olimp-2; Attendance: 14,320; Referee: Igor Nizovtsev

30 April 2015 10	Amkar Perm'	2 – 0	Dynamo Moscow	Perm
17:00 MSK (UTC+4)	Peev 22' (pen.); Kolomeytsev 32'	Summary	Hubočan (yellow card) 22'; Katrich (yellow card) 89'	Stadium: Zvezda Stadium; Attendance: 7,700; Referee: Sergey Lapochkin

3 May 2015 26	Kuban Krasnodar	1 – 2	Dynamo Moscow	Krasnodar
13:30 MSK (UTC+3)	Almeida 23'; Manolev (yellow card) 45' (yellow-red card) 85'; Bucur (red card) 89'	Summary	Yusupov (yellow card) 44'; Zhirkov (yellow card) 52'; Douglas 69'; Xandão 75' (o.g.)	Stadium: Kuban Stadium; Attendance: 9,211; Referee: Vladimir Moskalyov

10 May 2015 27	Dynamo Moscow	0 – 0	Torpedo Moscow	Khimki
16:00 MSK (UTC+3)	Rotenberg (yellow card) 45'; Samba (yellow card) 87'	Summary	Vieira (yellow card) 25'	Stadium: Arena Khimki; Attendance: 5,508; Referee: Sergei Ivanov

18 May 2015 28	Ural	2 – 1	Dynamo Moscow	Tyumen
17:00 MSK (UTC+3)	Khozin (yellow card) 7'; Acevedo 42'; Emelyanov (yellow card) 80'; Smolov 86'	Summary	Zobnin 34'; Douglas (yellow card) 47'; Dzsudzsák (yellow card) 79'; Kuranyi (yellow card) 86'; Ionov (yellow card) 89'	Stadium: Geolog Stadium; Attendance: 8,000; Referee: Mikhail Vilkov

24 May 2015 29	Dynamo Moscow	2 – 2	Arsenal Tula	Moscow
18:30 MSK (UTC+3)	Büttner (yellow card) 28' (yellow-red card) 58'; Ionov (yellow card) 35' (goal) 42'; Zhirkov (yellow card) 43'; Douglas (yellow card) 64'; Zobnin (yellow card) 70'; Vainqueur 76'	Summary	Kaleshin (yellow card) 25'; Osipov 34' (yellow card) 90+1'; Khagush (yellow card) 48' (goal) 60'; Kašćelan (yellow card) 72'; Zotov (yellow card) 79'	Stadium: Arena Khimki; Attendance: 4,375; Referee: Vitaly Meshkov

30 May 2015 30	Dynamo Moscow	1 – 1	Krasnodar	Moscow
13:30 MSK (UTC+3)	Dzsudzsák 16'; Kurányi (yellow card) 29'; Gabulov (yellow card) 78'; Rotenberg (yellow card) 89'	Summary	Shirokov 20'; Izmailov (yellow card) 90'	Stadium: Arena Khimki; Attendance: 7,827; Referee: Sergey Lapochkin

==== League table ====
Pos	Team	Pld	W	D	L	GF	GA	GD	Pts	Qualification or relegation
2	CSKA Moscow	30	19	3	8	67	27	+40	60	Qualification for the Champions League third qualifying round
3	Krasnodar	30	17	9	4	52	27	+25	60	Qualification for the Europa League third qualifying round
4	Dynamo Moscow	30	14	8	8	53	36	+17	50	
5	Rubin Kazan	30	13	9	8	39	33	+6	48	Qualification for the Europa League third qualifying round
6	Spartak Moscow	30	12	8	10	42	42	0	44	

Source: Russian Premier League
Rules for classification: 1) points; 2) number of matches won; 3) head-to-head points; 4) head-to-head wins; 5) head-to-head goal difference; 6) head-to-head goals; 7) number of head-to-head away goals; 8) goal difference; 9) number of goals scored; 10) number of away goals scored

=== Russian Cup ===
25 September 2015 Round of 32	Shinnik Yaroslavl	2 – 0	Dynamo Moscow	Yaroslavl
18:00 MSK (UTC+4)	Samodin 68', 75'	Summary		Stadium: Shinnik Stadium; Attendance: 2,000; Referee: Kirill Levnikov

=== UEFA Europa League ===
==== Qualifying phase ====
31 July 2014 Third Qualifying round 1st leg	Dynamo Moscow (Russia)	1 – 1	(Israel) Ironi Kiryat Shmona	Khimki, Russia
21:00 MSK (UTC+4)	Kurányi 71'; Manolev (yellow card) 84'	Report	Brown (yellow card) 19'; Kola 63'; Abed (yellow card) 74'	Stadium: Arena Khimki; Attendance: 7,583; Referee: Kristinn Jakobsson (Iceland)

7 August 2014 Third Qualifying round 2nd leg	Ironi Kiryat Shmona (Israel)	1 – 2 (2 – 3 agg.)	(Russia) Dynamo Moscow	Nicosia, Cyprus
22:00 MSK (UTC+4)	Kahat 11'; Abed (yellow card) 44'; Brown (yellow card) 86'	Report	Kurányi 22' (pen.); Ionov 30'; Smolov (yellow card) 68'; Denisov (yellow card) 90+4'	Stadium: GSP Stadium; Attendance: 464; Referee: Richard Liesveld (Netherlands)

21 August 2014 Play-off round 1st leg	Dynamo Moscow (Russia)	2 – 2	(Cyprus) AC Omonia	Khimki, Russia
19:30 MSK (UTC+4)	Samba 33'; Kokorin (yellow card) 43' (yellow-red card) 62'; Kuranyi (yellow card) 66'} Büttner 72'	Report	Lobzhanidze 2' (yellow card) 83'; Fofana 59'; Acquistapace (yellow card) 68'; Serginho (yellow card) 74'	Stadium: Arena Khimki; Attendance: 7,146; Referee: Stephan Studer (Switzerland)

28 August 2014 Play-off round 2nd leg	AC Omonia (Cyprus)	1 – 2 (3 – 4 agg.)	(Russia) Dynamo Moscow	Nicosia, Cyprus
20:00 MSK (UTC+4)	Poté 23'; Cristóvão (yellow card) 26'; Fofana (yellow card) 63'; Lobjanidze (yellow card) 76'; Assis (yellow card) 84'; Kyriakou (yellow card) 88'; Stepanov (yellow card) 90+3'; Margaça (yellow card) 90+6'	Report	Stepanov 11' (o.g.); Vainqueur (yellow card) 34' (yellow-red card) 73'; Samba 90+3'	Stadium: GSP Stadium; Attendance: 20,081; Referee: Alexandru Tudor (Romania)

==== Group stage ====
Pos	Team	Pld	W	D	L	GF	GA	GD	Pts	Qualification	DYM	PSV	EST	PAN
1	(Russia) Dynamo Moscow	6	6	0	0	9	3	+6	18	Advance to knockout phase	—	1–0	1–0	2–1
2	(Netherlands) PSV Eindhoven	6	2	2	2	8	8	0	8	Advance to knockout phase	0–1	—	1–0	1–1
3	(Portugal) Estoril	6	1	2	3	7	8	−1	5		1–2	3–3	—	2–0
4	(Greece) Panathinaikos	6	0	2	4	6	11	−5	2		1–2	2–3	1–1	—

Source: Soccerway
Rules for classification: Group stage tiebreakers

18 September 2014 1	Panathinaikos (Greece)	1 – 2	(Russia) Dynamo Moscow	Athens, Greece
21:00 MSK (UTC+4)	Triantafyllopoulos (yellow card) 52'; Dinas 63'	Report	Kokorin 40'; Ionov 49' (yellow card) 66'; Yusupov (yellow card) 81'	Stadium: Leoforos Alexandras Stadium; Attendance: 14,000; Referee: Daniele Orsato (Italy)

2 October 2014 2	Dynamo Moscow (Russia)	1 – 0	(Netherlands) PSV Eindhoven	Khimki, Russia
18:00 CEST (UTC+2)	Douglas (yellow card) 90+2'; Zhirkov 90+3'	Report	Arias (yellow card) 49'; Maher (yellow card) 60'; Jozefzoon (yellow card) 76'	Stadium: Arena Khimki; Attendance: 7,872; Referee: Marcin Borski (Poland)

23 October 2014 3	Estoril (Portugal)	1 – 2	(Russia) Dynamo Moscow	Estoril, Portugal
23:05 MSK (UTC+4)	Kléber (yellow card) 62'; Bruno Miguel (yellow card) 70'; Sebá (yellow card) 75'; Tavares 90+5'	Report	Vainqueur (yellow card) 42'; Kokorin 52'; Zhirkov 80'; Noboa (yellow card) 90+2'	Stadium: Estádio António Coimbra da Mota; Attendance: 2,164; Referee: Alon Yefet (Israel)

6 November 2014 4	Dynamo Moscow (Russia)	1 – 0	(Portugal) Estoril	Khimki, Russia
20:00 MSK (UTC+3)	Denisov (yellow card) 35'; Kurányi 77'; Büttner (yellow card) 90+3'	Report	Luiz (yellow card) 71'; Amado (yellow card) 77'	Stadium: Arena Khimki; Attendance: 5,374; Referee: Mattias Gestranius (Finland)

27 November 2014 5	Dynamo Moscow (Russia)	2 – 1	(Greece) Panathinaikos	Khimki, Russia
19:00 MSK (UTC+3)	Douglas (yellow card) 32'; Vainqueur 55'; Ionov 61'	Report	Berg 14' (yellow card) 48'; Bourbos (yellow card) 44'	Stadium: Arena Khimki; Attendance: 4,207; Referee: Eitan Shemeulevitch (Israel)

11 December 2014 6	PSV Eindhoven (Netherlands)	0 – 1	(Russia) Dynamo Moscow	Eindhoven, Netherlands
21:00 MSK (UTC+4)	Isimat-Mirin (yellow card) 75'	Report	Vainqueur (yellow card) 28'; Kozlov (yellow card) 64'; Ionov 89'	Stadium: Philips Stadion; Referee: István Vad (Hungary)

==== Knockout stage ====
19 February 2015 Round of 32 1st leg	Anderlecht (Belgium)	0 – 0	(Russia) Dynamo Moscow	Brussels, Belgium
23:05 MSK (UTC+3)	Vanden Borre (yellow card) 73'	Report	Denisov (yellow card) 54'; Yusupov (yellow card) 56'; Büttner (yellow card) 57' (yellow-red card) 75'; Kozlov (yellow card) 69'	Stadium: Constant Vanden Stock Stadium; Attendance: 17,317; Referee: Felix Zwayer (Germany)

26 February 2015 Round of 32 2nd leg	Dynamo Moscow (Russia)	3 – 1 (3 – 1 agg.)	(Belgium) Anderlecht	Khimki, Russia
20:00 MSK (UTC+3)	Kozlov 47'; Yusupov 64' (yellow card) 81'; Valbuena (yellow card) 75'; Hubočan (yellow card) 77'; Kurányi 90+5'	Report	Deschacht (yellow card) 3'; Mitrović 29'	Stadium: Arena Khimki; Attendance: 12,316; Referee: Svein Oddvar Moen (Norway)

12 March 2015 Round of 16 First leg	Napoli (Italy)	3 – 1	(Russia) Dynamo Moscow	Naples, Italy
23:05 MSK (UTC+04:00)	Higuaín 25', 31' (pen.), 55'; Ghoulam (yellow card) 28'	Report	Kurányi 2'; Valbuena (yellow card) 30'; Zobnin (yellow card) 32' (yellow-red card) 46'; Dzsudzsák (yellow card) 41'; Hubočan (yellow card) 78'; Samba (yellow card) 80'	Stadium: Stadio San Paolo; Attendance: 17,727; Referee: Anastasios Sidiropoulos (Greece)

19 March 2015 Round of 16 Second leg	Dynamo Moscow (Russia)	0 – 0 (1 – 3 agg.)	(Italy) Napoli	Khimki, Russia
20:00 MSK (UTC+3)	Vainqueur (yellow card) 72'	Report	Maggio (yellow card) 42'; Mertens (yellow card) 53'	Stadium: Arena Khimki; Attendance: 17,356; Referee: Bas Nijhuis

== Squad statistics ==
As of match played 30 May 2015

=== Appearances and goals ===
No.	Pos	Nat	Player	Total		Premier League		Russian Cup		Europa League	
No.	Pos	Nat	Player	Apps	Goals	Apps	Goals	Apps	Goals	Apps	Goals
1	GK	(Russia) RUS	Anton Shunin	4	0	2	0	1	0	1	0
3	DF	(Netherlands) NED	Alexander Büttner	31	1	18+1	0	0	0	10+2	1
4	DF	(Republic of the Congo) CGO	Christopher Samba	38	6	24	4	0	0	14	2
5	DF	(Netherlands) NED	Douglas	32	3	20+3	3	1	0	7+1	0
6	MF	(France) FRA	William Vainqueur	41	3	23+4	2	1	0	13	1
7	MF	(Hungary) HUN	Balázs Dzsudzsák	43	7	19+10	7	0+1	0	12+1	0
8	MF	(Russia) RUS	Artur Yusupov	28	2	17+3	1	1	0	5+2	1
9	FW	(Russia) RUS	Aleksandr Kokorin	39	10	18+9	8	1	0	10+1	2
11	MF	(Russia) RUS	Aleksei Ionov	44	13	24+5	9	0+1	0	10+4	4
14	FW	(France) FRA	Mathieu Valbuena	36	4	24+1	4	0	0	10+1	0
15	DF	(Slovakia) SVK	Tomáš Hubočan	27	1	17+1	1	1	0	7+1	0
18	MF	(Russia) RUS	Yuri Zhirkov	35	2	21+3	0	1	0	4+6	2
21	GK	(Armenia) ARM	Roman Berezovsky	9	0	6	0	0	0	3	0
22	FW	(Germany) GER	Kevin Kurányi	39	15	18+6	10	0+1	0	9+5	5
25	DF	(Russia) RUS	Aleksei Kozlov	19	1	7+5	0	0	0	7	1
27	MF	(Russia) RUS	Igor Denisov	21	0	13	0	0	0	7+1	0
28	DF	(Russia) RUS	Boris Rotenberg	13	0	9+1	0	1	0	1+1	0
30	GK	(Russia) RUS	Vladimir Gabulov	32	0	22	0	0	0	10	0
47	MF	(Russia) RUS	Roman Zobnin	16	1	5+10	1	0	0	1	0
77	MF	(Russia) RUS	Anatoli Katrich	4	0	0+4	0	0	0	0	0
81	DF	(Russia) RUS	Yegor Danilkin	1	0	0+1	0	0	0	0	0
88	MF	(Russia) RUS	Aleksandr Tashayev	3	0	0+1	0	0	0	0+2	0
96	MF	(Russia) RUS	Maksim Kuzmin	1	0	0+1	0	0	0	0	0
Players away from the club on loan:
10	FW	(Russia) RUS	Fyodor Smolov	4	0	3	0	0	0	0+1	0
13	DF	(Russia) RUS	Vladimir Granat	14	0	9	0	1	0	3+1	0
Players who appeared for Dynamo Moscow no longer at the club:
16	MF	(Ecuador) ECU	Christian Noboa	19	0	7+4	0	0	0	6+2	0
23	MF	(Bulgaria) BUL	Stanislav Manolev	14	1	5+3	1	1	0	4+1	0
99	FW	(Russia) RUS	Aleksandr Prudnikov	11	0	2+4	0	1	0	0+4	0

=== Goal Scorers ===
Place	Position	Nation	Number	Name	Russian Premier League	Russian Cup	UEFA Europa League	Total
1	FW	(Germany)	22	Kevin Kurányi	10	0	5	15
2	MF	(Russia)	11	Aleksei Ionov	9	0	4	13
3	FW	(Russia)	9	Aleksandr Kokorin	8	0	2	10
4	MF	(Hungary)	7	Balázs Dzsudzsák	7	0	0	7
5	DF	(Republic of the Congo)	4	Christopher Samba	4	0	2	6
6	MF	(France)	14	Mathieu Valbuena	4	0	0	4
7	DF	(Netherlands)	5	Douglas	3	0	0	3
7	MF	(France)	6	William Vainqueur	2	0	1	3
9	MF	(Russia)	8	Artur Yusupov	1	0	1	2
9				Own goal	1	0	1	2
9	MF	(Russia)	18	Yuri Zhirkov	0	0	2	2
12	MF	(Ecuador)	16	Christian Noboa	1	0	0	1
12	DF	(Slovakia)	15	Tomáš Hubočan	1	0	0	1
12	MF	(Bulgaria)	23	Stanislav Manolev	1	0	0	1
12	MF	(Russia)	47	Roman Zobnin	1	0	0	1
12	DF	(Netherlands)	3	Alexander Büttner	0	0	1	1
12	DF	(Russia)	25	Aleksei Kozlov	0	0	1	1
				TOTALS	53	0	20	73

=== Disciplinary record ===
Number	Nation	Position	Name	Russian Premier League		Russian Cup		UEFA Europa League		Total	
Number	Nation	Position	Name	Yellow card	Red card	Yellow card	Red card	Yellow card	Red card	Yellow card	Red card
3	(Netherlands)	DF	Alexander Büttner	8	1	0	0	3	1	11	2
4	(Republic of the Congo)	DF	Christopher Samba	0	0	0	1	0	5	0	
5	(Netherlands)	DF	Douglas	5	0	0	0	2	0	7	0
6	(France)	MF	William Vainqueur	5	0	0	0	5	1	10	1
7	(Hungary)	MF	Balázs Dzsudzsák	1	0	0	0	1	0	2	0
8	(Russia)	MF	Artur Yusupov	6	1	0	0	3	0	9	1
9	(Russia)	FW	Aleksandr Kokorin	2	0	0	0	2	1	4	1
10	(Russia)	FW	Fyodor Smolov	0	0	0	0	1	0	1	0
11	(Russia)	MF	Aleksei Ionov	2	0	0	0	1	0	3	0
13	(Russia)	DF	Vladimir Granat	2	0	0	0	0	0	2	0
14	(France)	MF	Mathieu Valbuena	3	0	0	0	2	0	5	0
15	(Slovakia)	DF	Tomáš Hubočan	4	0	0	0	2	0	6	0
16	(Ecuador)	MF	Christian Noboa	2	0	0	0	1	0	3	0
18	(Russia)	DF	Yuri Zhirkov	6	0	0	0	0	0	6	0
22	(Germany)	FW	Kevin Kurányi	2	0	0	0	1	0	3	0
23	(Bulgaria)	MF	Stanislav Manolev	1	0	0	0	1	0	2	0
25	(Russia)	DF	Aleksei Kozlov	2	0	0	0	2	0	4	0
27	(Russia)	MF	Igor Denisov	2	0	0	0	3	0	5	0
28	(Russia)	DF	Boris Rotenberg	4	0	0	0	0	0	4	0
30	(Russia)	GK	Vladimir Gabulov	2	0	0	0	0	0	2	0
47	(Russia)	MF	Roman Zobnin	2	0	0	0	2	1	4	1
77	(Russia)	MF	Anatoli Katrich	1	0	0	0	0	0	1	0
			TOTALS	67	2	0	0	32	4	99	6

== Notes ==
1. Due to the 2014 Israel–Gaza conflict, the UEFA Emergency Panel decided that Israeli clubs must play their home legs outside of the country in the third qualifying round.
- MSK time changed from UTC+4 to UTC+3 permanently on 26 October 2014.
