= 2015 Israel Super Cup =

Maccabi Tel Aviv	Ironi Kiryat Shmona
2	2
- Ironi Kiryat Shmona won 5–4 on penalties
- Date: 15 August 2015
- Venue: Netanya Stadium, Netanya
- Referee: Orel Grinfeld
- Attendance: 7,000

The 2015 Israel Super Cup was the 20th Israel Super Cup (25th, including unofficial matches, as the competition wasn't played within the Israel Football Association in its first 5 editions, until 1969), an annual Israel football match played between the winners of the previous season's Top Division and Israel State Cup. This was the first time since 1990 that the match was staged, after a planned resumption of the cup was cancelled in 2014.

The game was played between Maccabi Tel Aviv, champions of the 2014–15 Israeli Premier League and Ironi Kiryat Shmona, runners-up in the league, as Maccabi Tel Aviv won the State Cup final.

This was Maccabi Tel Aviv's fifth Israel Super Cup appearance (7th, including unofficial matches) and Kiryat Shmona's first. Watched by a crowd of 7,000 at Netanya Stadium, Ironi Kiryat Shmona won the match 5–4 on penalties, after a 2–2 draw in extra time.

== Match details ==
14 August 2015
20:50

Maccabi Tel Aviv	2–2 (a.e.t.)	Ironi Kiryat Shmona
Zahavi 70', 103'	IFA Report	Maimoni 73'; Abed 115'
Penalties
Zahavi (penalty missed); Ben Haim (penalty scored); Ben Haim II (penalty scored); Azulay (penalty scored); Itzhaki (penalty scored); Micha (penalty missed)	4–5	Abed (penalty missed); Fernandes (penalty scored); Shamir (penalty scored); Maimoni (penalty scored); Vladimir Brown (penalty scored); Balilti (penalty scored)

Netanya, Netanya
Attendance: 7,000
Referee: Orel Grinfeld

Maccabi Tel Aviv	Ironi Kiryat Shmona

GK	25	(Spain) Juan Pablo
RB	2	(Israel) Eli Dasa
CB	18	(Israel) Eitan Tibi
CB	26	(Israel) Tal Ben Haim
LB	20	(Israel) Omri Ben Harush	(yellow card) 98'
CM	6	(Israel) Gal Alberman	(yellow card) 110'
CM	40	(Nigeria) Nosa Igiebor		(substituted off) 67'
AM	24	(Serbia) Nikola Mitrović		(substituted off) 74'
RM	11	(Israel) Tal Ben Haim II	(yellow card) 36'
LM	22	(Israel) Avi Rikan		(substituted off) 85'
FW	7	(Israel) Eran Zahavi (c)
Substitutes:
GK	55	(Israel) Haviv Ohayon
DF	3	(Israel) Yuval Spungin
DF	31	(Spain) Carlos García
MF	15	(Israel) Dor Micha	(yellow card) 92'	(substituted in) 85'
MF	16	(Israel) Shlomi Azulay		(substituted in) 67'
MF	28	(Israel) Gil Vermouth
MF	10	(Israel) Barak Yitzhaki		(substituted in) 74'
Manager:
(Serbia) Slaviša Jokanović

GK	55	(Israel) Guy Haimov (c)	(yellow card) 112'
RB	14	(Israel) Oded Elkayam
DF	3	(Brazil) Kassio Fernandes Magalhães
DF	5	(Bolivia) Luis Gutiérrez	(yellow card) 45' (yellow-red card) 59'
LB	2	(Israel) Daniel Borchal		(substituted off) 91'
RM	15	(Israel) Vladimir Brown
CM	18	(Israel) Eden Shamir	(yellow card) 107'
CM	8	(Israel) Roei Shukrani
LM	8	(Israel) Ofir Mizrahi		(substituted off) 64'
FW	7	(Israel) Ahmed Abed
FW	37	(Brazil) Bruno		(substituted off) 77'
Substitutes:
GK	45	(Israel) Mahdi Zoabi
DF	26	(Israel) Dean Maimoni		(substituted in) 64'
DF	16	(Israel) Eliyahu Balilti		(substituted in) 91'
MF	20	(Israel) Naor Abudi
MF	23	(Israel) Adrian Rochet
FW	77	(Israel) Ido Exbard
FW	9	(Nigeria) Ugwo Chukwuma	(yellow card) 94'	(substituted in) 77'
Manager:
(Israel) Salah Hasarma

Man of the Match:

MATCH OFFICIALS

- Assistant referees:
  - Dudu Bitton
  - Nissan Davidi
- Fourth official:
  - Erez Papir
- Additional assistant referees:
  - Ziv Adler
  - Ro'I Reinschreiber

Match rules

- 90 minutes.
- 30 minutes of extra time if necessary.
- Penalty shoot-out if scores level.
- Seven named substitutes, of which up to three may be used.
