= Rafael Jataí =

Brazilian footballer

Personal information
- Full name: Rafael Fagundes Mariano
- Date of birth: 19 May 1989 (age 37)
- Place of birth: Jataí, Brazil
- Height: 1.81 m (5 ft 11 in)
- Position: Defensive midfielder

Team information
- Current team: Juventude-RS

Youth career
- 2003–2008: América
- 2008: Atlético Paranaense
- 2009: Atlético Mineiro

Senior career*
Years	Team	Apps	(Gls)
2008	América-MG	0	(0)
2008	Atlético Paranaense	0	(0)
2009–2011	Atlético Mineiro	15	(1)
2011	→ Bahia (loan)	0	(0)
2011	→ Guarani (loan)	3	(0)
2011	→ Ipatinga (loan)	37	(0)
2012–2014	Rio Branco	10	(1)
2015	Guarani	30	(0)
2015–2016	Tupi	9	(0)
2016	Hapoel Ironi Kiryat Shmona	5	(0)
2017	América-MG	2	(0)
2018–	América-MG	4	(1)
- * Club domestic league appearances and goals as of 7 May 2018

Fagundes Rafael Mariano (born 19 May 1989), also known as Rafael Jataí, is a Brazilian professional footballer who plays as defensive midfielder for Botafogo-PB.

== Career ==
Is half revealed in the basic categories of Atlético Paranaense. Up to mid-professional in August 2009 and debuted in defeating the Roosters to the Corinthians by 2-0.

== Career statistics ==
(Correct as of 16 October 2010)

Club	Season	State League		Brazilian Série A		Copa do Brasil		Copa Sudamericana		Total	
Club	Season	Apps	Goals	Apps	Goals	Apps	Goals	Apps	Goals	Apps	Goals
América	2008	-	-	-	-	-	-	-	-	0	0
Atlético Paranaense	2008	-	-	0	0	-	-	-	-	0	0
Atlético Mineiro	2009	-	-	1	0	-	-	-	-	1	0
Atlético Mineiro	2010	0	0	11	0	-	-	0	0	11	0
Total		0	0	12	0	-	-	0	0	12	0
