= Carlos García (footballer, born 1984) =

Spanish football manager and former player (born 1984)

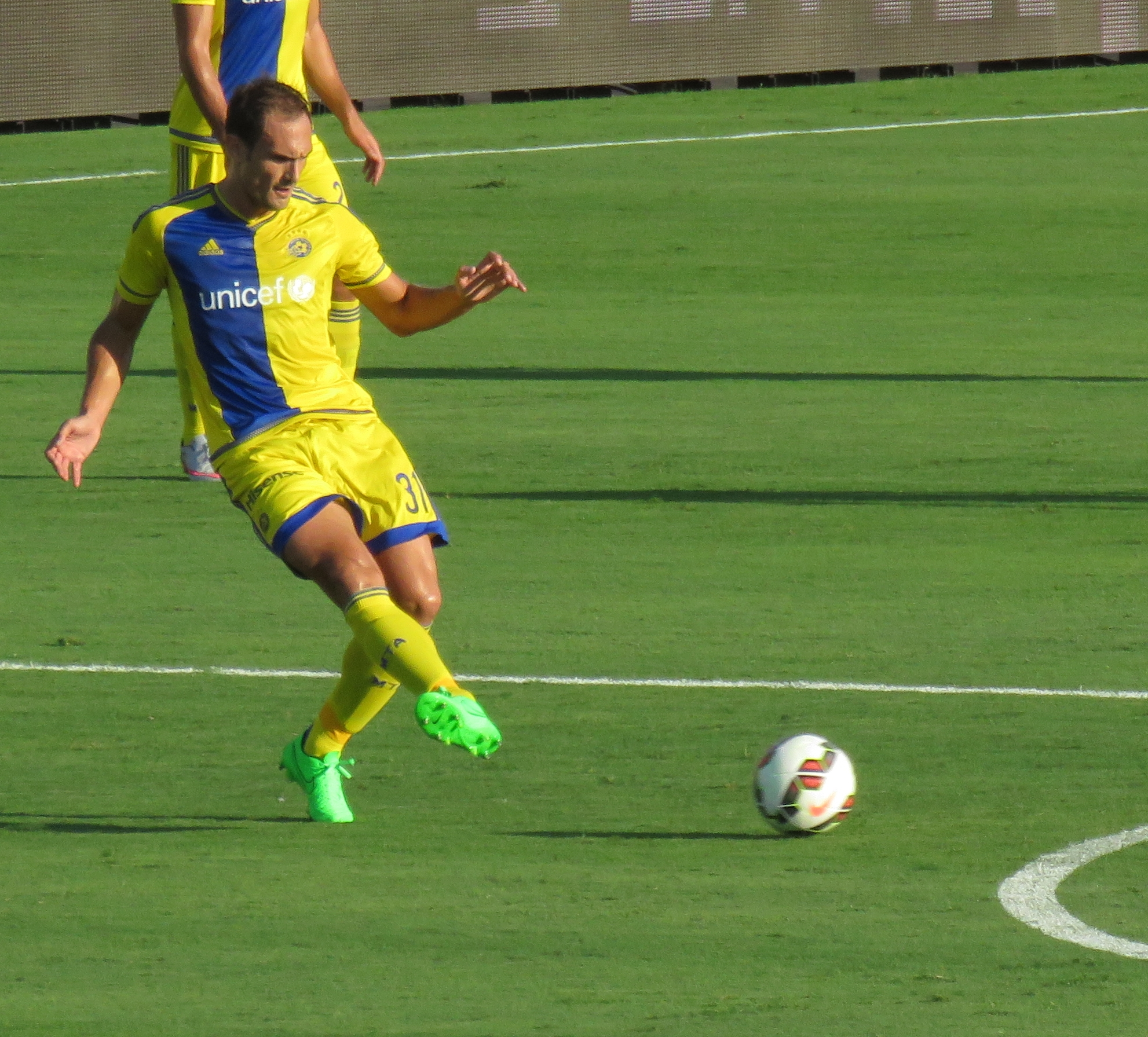
- García with Maccabi Tel Aviv in 2015

Personal information
- Full name: Carlos García Badías
- Date of birth: 29 April 1984 (age 42)
- Place of birth: Barcelona, Spain
- Height: 1.85 m (6 ft 1 in)
- Position: Centre-back

Team information
- Current team: Jong Ajax (manager)

Youth career
- 1999–2003: Espanyol

Senior career*
Years	Team	Apps	(Gls)
2002–2004	Espanyol B	30	(1)
2003–2005	Espanyol	3	(0)
2004–2005	→ Poli Ejido (loan)	34	(1)
2005–2012	Almería	195	(1)
2009–2010	→ Betis (loan)	33	(1)
2012–2016	Maccabi Tel Aviv	115	(7)
2016–2017	Alanyaspor	9	(0)
Total		419	(11)

International career
2000–2001	Spain U16	13	(0)
2001	Spain U17	3	(0)
2002–2003	Spain U19	4	(0)
2002–2003	Spain U20	9	(0)
2004–2006	Spain U21	5	(0)
2005	Spain U23	4	(0)

Managerial career
- 2017–2018: Maccabi Tel Aviv (assistant)
- 2018–2019: Chongqing Dangdai Lifan (assistant)
- 2020: Ecuador (assistant)
- 2020–2021: Shenzhen (assistant)
- 2022: Beitar Tel Aviv Bat Yam
- 2022–2023: Udinese (assistant)
- 2024: Chicago Fire (assistant)
- 2025: Flamurtari
- 2026: Jong Ajax (assistant)
- 2026: Ajax (assistant)
- 2026–: Jong Ajax
Medal record
Men's Football
Representing Spain
UEFA European Under-16 Championship
Winner	2001 England
- * Club domestic league appearances and goals

Carlos García Badías (born 29 April 1984) is a Spanish former professional footballer who played as a central defender. He is the current manager of Eerste Divisie club Jong Ajax.

He spent most of his career with Almería, playing 208 competitive matches for the club and appearing in three La Liga seasons. Additionally, he had a four-year spell with Maccabi Tel Aviv in the Israeli Premier League.

== Club career ==
=== Espanyol and Almería ===
Born in Barcelona, Catalonia, García was a product of local RCD Espanyol's youth ranks. He would only appear for the first team on three occasions, during the 2003–04 season (three defeats), also serving a loan stint with Polideportivo Ejido in the Segunda División the following campaign.

García stayed in Andalusia in 2005, being sold by Espanyol to second-division UD Almería. He was a starter from the beginning, being instrumental in their first-ever La Liga promotion in the 2006–07 campaign.

Deemed surplus to requirements by manager Hugo Sánchez, García was loaned to neighbours Real Betis for 2009–10's second-tier season. After not being able to help the Verdiblancos return to the top flight he rejoined Almería, being first-choice under new manager Juan Manuel Lillo and both his successors José Luis Oltra and Roberto Olabe, scoring once in 33 games as they were eventually relegated after a four-year stay.

=== Maccabi Tel Aviv ===
García moved abroad for the first time in his career in June 2012, signing a three-year contract with Maccabi Tel Aviv F.C. in the Israeli Premier League. In his first season he was teamed up in the centre of defence with Eitan Tibi, with the pair performing solidly as the club won the national championship after a ten-year drought.

Aged 29, García made his debut in European competition in the 2013–14 campaign, featuring in both the UEFA Champions League qualification matches and the UEFA Europa League group stage. In the domestic front he was part of the squad that set a new league record for minutes without conceding a goal, surpassing Hapoel Haifa FC's 585 from 1999.

García retired in 2017 at the age of 33, after one season in the Turkish Süper Lig with Alanyaspor.

== International career ==
García was part of the Spain under-16 squad at the 2001 UEFA European Under-16 Championship in England, winning the tournament alongside top scorer Fernando Torres. Two years later, he contributed seven starts for the under-20s as they finished runners-up to Brazil in the FIFA World Cup.

== Coaching career ==
Immediately after retiring, García returned to Maccabi as assistant to his compatriot Jordi Cruyff. The pair worked together again in the Chinese Super League, at Chongqing Dangdai Lifan F.C. and Shenzhen FC.

García became manager of Liga Leumit side Beitar Tel Aviv Bat Yam F.C. in January 2022. He returned to assistant duties subsequently, at Serie A's Udinese Calcio and Major League Soccer's Chicago Fire FC.

On 27 June 2025, García was appointed head coach of Flamurtari FC, recently returned to the Albanian Kategoria Superiore. In October, he left by mutual agreement.

García joined AFC Ajax in February 2026, initially as assistant manager at the reserve team in the Eerste Divisie. The following month, however, after head coach Óscar García was promoted to the main squad, he accompanied him.

Ahead of the 2026–27 season, García became manager of Ajax B.

== Honours ==
Maccabi Tel Aviv

- Israeli Premier League: 2012–13, 2013–14, 2014–15
- Israel State Cup: 2014–15
- Toto Cup: 2014–15

Spain U16

- UEFA European Under-16 Championship: 2001

Spain U23

- Mediterranean Games: 2005

Spain U20

- FIFA U-20 World Cup runner-up: 2003
