= Dean Maimoni =

Israeli footballer

Dean Maimoni דין מיימוני
Personal information
- Full name: Dean Maimoni
- Date of birth: May 4, 1990 (age 36)
- Place of birth: Mevo Hama, Israel
- Height: 1.80 m (5 ft 11 in)
- Position: Center-back

Team information
- Current team: Hapoel Iksal

Youth career
- Ironi Kiryat Shmona

Senior career*
Years	Team	Apps	(Gls)
2011–2018	Ironi Kiryat Shmona	27	(1)
2011	→ Bnei Sakhnin	0	(0)
2011–2012	→ Maccabi Ahi Nazareth	9	(0)
2012–2013	→ Hapoel Acre	3	(0)
2018	Maccabi Netanya	2	(0)
2018	Hapoel Ra'anana	5	(0)
2019–2020	Hapoel Ramat Gan	29	(0)
2020	Hapoel Umm al-Fahm	5	(0)
2020–2021	Hapoel Iksal	5	(1)
- * Club domestic league appearances and goals

Dean Maimoni (Hebrew: דין מיימוני; born May 4, 1990), is an Israeli footballer who plays as a center defender for Hapoel Iksal.

== Honours ==
=== Club ===
Hapoel Kiryat Shmona

- Israel Super Cup: 2015
