= Kassio (footballer, born 1987) =

Brazilian footballer

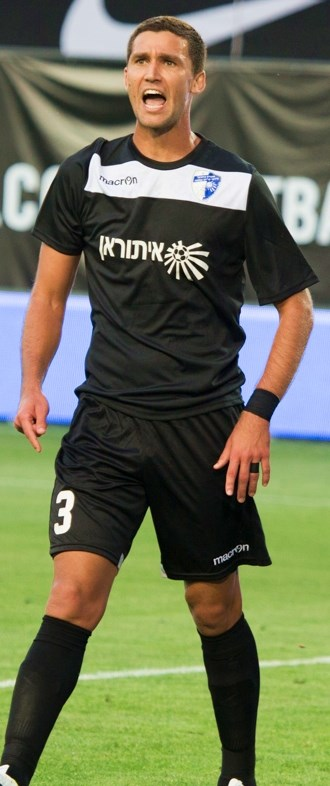
- Kassio playing for Ironi Kiryat Shmona in 2014

Personal information
- Full name: Kassio Fernandes Magalhães
- Date of birth: 11 February 1987 (age 39)
- Place of birth: Minaçu, Brazil
- Height: 1.92 m (6 ft 4 in)
- Positions: Centre-back; defensive midfielder

Senior career*
Years	Team	Apps	(Gls)
2006–2007	Sport Club Ulbra		
2007–2009	AEK Larnaca	38	(0)
2009–2012	Ethnikos Achna	64	(4)
2012	Changchun Yatai	27	(1)
2013–2017	Ironi Kiryat Shmona	110	(5)
2018–2019	Maccabi Ahi Nazareth	31	(1)
2019–2020	Vilafranquense	10	(0)
- * Club domestic league appearances and goals

Kassio Fernandes Magalhães (born 11 February 1987) is a Brazilian former professional footballer who played as a centre-back.

== Career ==
In March 2012, Kassio signed for Chinese Super League team Changchun Yatai. On 16 June 2012, he scored his first goal for the club in a 2–0 home win against Shanghai Shenhua.

== Career statistics ==
As of 5 August 2014

Appearances and goals by club, season and competition
Club	Season	League			National cup		Continental		Total	
Club	Season	Division	Apps	Goals	Apps	Goals	Apps	Goals	Apps	Goals
Changchun Yatai	2012	Chinese Super League	27	1			—		27	0
Ironi Kiryat Shmona	2014–15	Israeli Premier League	34	2	3	0	—		37	2
Ironi Kiryat Shmona	2014–15	Israeli Premier League	0	0	0	0	1	0	1	0
Ironi Kiryat Shmona	Total		34	2	3	0	1	0	38	2
Career total			61	2	3	0	1	0	65	2

== Honours ==
Hapoel Kiryat Shmona

- Israel State Cup: 2013–14
- Israel Super Cup: 2015
