= Eden Shamir =

Israeli footballer

Personal information
- Date of birth: 25 June 1995 (age 31)
- Place of birth: Kiryat Motzkin, Israel
- Height: 1.85 m (6 ft 1 in)
- Position: Midfielder

Team information
- Current team: Bnei Sakhnin
- Number: 23

Youth career
- 2005–2012: Hapoel Haifa
- 2012–2015: Ironi Kiryat Shmona

Senior career*
Years	Team	Apps	(Gls)
2013–2019	Ironi Kiryat Shmona	122	(12)
2019–2020	Hapoel Be'er Sheva	17	(1)
2020–2022	Standard Liège	24	(0)
2021–2022	→ Maccabi Tel Aviv (loan)	23	(2)
2022–2024	Hapoel Be'er Sheva	53	(5)
2024–2025	Maccabi Petah Tikva	28	(0)
2025–	Bnei Sakhnin	28	(2)

International career^{‡}
2011	Israel U16	3	(0)
2011–2012	Israel U17	10	(0)
2012–2013	Israel U18	7	(0)
2013–2014	Israel U19	15	(3)
2015	Israel U21	1	(0)
2024–	Israel	1	(0)
- * Club domestic league appearances and goals as of 24 June 2026 ‡ National team caps and goals as of 8 June 2024

Eden Shamir (Hebrew: עדן שמיר; born 25 June 1995) is an Israeli professional footballer who plays as a midfielder for Israeli Premier League club Bnei Sakhnin and the Israel national team.

== Early life ==
Shamir was born in Kiryat Motzkin, Israel.

== Career ==
=== Hapoel Be'er Sheva ===
On 19 June 2019, Shamir concluded at Hapoel Be'er Sheva for four years. On 11 July, Shamir made his debut in Hapoel Be'er Sheva uniforms in a 1–1 draw against Laçi as part of the UEFA Europa League at Laçi Stadium. On 25 August, Shamir made his debut in the Israeli Premier League in a 0–0 draw against the Beitar Jerusalem at Teddy Stadium. On 5 October, Shamir scored his first goal in the Israeli Premier League in a 3–0 victory over Hapoel Haifa at Sammy Ofer Stadium.

=== Standard Liège ===
In January 2020, Shamir joined Belgian club Standard Liège on a 1.8 million euro transfer fee, signing a 3.5 year contract.

==== Loan to Maccabi Tel Aviv ====
On 11 August 2021, Shamir was loaned to Maccabi Tel Aviv. At the end of the 2021–22 Israeli Premier League season, Shamir returned to parent club Standard Liège, after scoring eight times in 23 games in all competitions, sitting on the bench more than he expected.

After returning from loan, Shamir played in the second half of a pre-season friendly against Go Ahead Eagles, scoring and assisting, helping the team win 5–1.

=== Return to Hapoel Be'er Sheva ===
After opening the season with Standard Liège, in September 2022 Shamir returned to Israel, signing a three-year contract with Hapoel Be'er Sheva.

== International career ==
He has been a youth international since 2011. In 2015, he was selected for the first time with Israel under-21s.

He was first called up for the senior Israel national team in October 2021, during their 2022 FIFA World Cup qualifiers - UEFA.

Shamir made his debut for the senior squad on 8 June 2024 in a friendly against Hungary at the Nagyerdei Stadion. He started the game, but was substituted after 30 minutes as Israel fell behind 0–3. The game ended with that score.

== Personal life ==
On 27 June 2025 Shamir got engaged to judoka Gefen Primo. The couple got married on 15 January 2026.

== Career statistics ==
As of 1 June 2022

Club	Season	League	League		Cup		League Cup		Europe		Super Cup		Total	
Club	Season	League	Apps	Goals	Apps	Goals	Apps	Goals	Apps	Goals	Apps	Goals	Apps	Goals
Ironi Kiryat Shmona	2013–14	Israeli Premier League	12	0	2	0	0	0	–	–	0	0	14	0
Ironi Kiryat Shmona	2014–15	Israeli Premier League	6	0	0	0	1	0	–	–	0	0	7	0
Ironi Kiryat Shmona	2015–16	Israeli Premier League	32	3	0	0	7	0	1	0	1	0	41	3
Ironi Kiryat Shmona	2016–17	Israeli Premier League	24	2	4	0	8	0	–	–	0	0	36	2
Ironi Kiryat Shmona	2017–18	Israeli Premier League	16	2	3	1	5	0	–	–	0	0	24	3
Ironi Kiryat Shmona	2018–19	Israeli Premier League	32	5	1	1	4	0	–	–	0	0	37	6
Ironi Kiryat Shmona	Total		122	12	10	2	25	0	1	0	1	0	159	14
Hapoel Be'er Sheva	2019–20	Israeli Premier League	17	1	0	0	0	0	8	2	0	0	25	3
Hapoel Be'er Sheva	Total		17	1	0	0	0	0	8	2	0	0	25	3
Standard Liège	2019–20	Belgian First Division A	3	0	0	0	0	0	0	0	0	0	3	0
Standard Liège	2020–21	Belgian First Division A	16	0	2	0	0	0	5	0	0	0	23	0
Standard Liège	2021–22	Belgian First Division A	1	0	0	0	0	0	0	0	0	0	1	0
Standard Liège	2022–23	Belgian First Division A	0	0	0	0	0	0	0	0	0	0	0	0
Standard Liège	Total		20	0	2	0	0	0	5	0	0	0	27	0
Maccabi Tel Aviv	2021–22	Israeli Premier League	23	3	3	1	1	0	7	3	0	0	33	7
Maccabi Tel Aviv	Total		23	3	3	1	1	0	7	3	0	0	33	7
Hapoel Be'er Sheva	2022–23	Israeli Premier League	26	2	1	0	2	0	6	0	0	0	35	2
Hapoel Be'er Sheva	Total		0	0	0	0	0	0	0	0	0	0	0	0
Career total			182	16	15	3	26	0	21	5	1	0	244	24

== Honours ==
Ironi Kiryat Shmona

- Israel State Cup: 2013–14
- Israel Super Cup: 2015
