= Barak Yitzhaki =

Israeli footballer

Barak Itzhaki ברק יצחקי
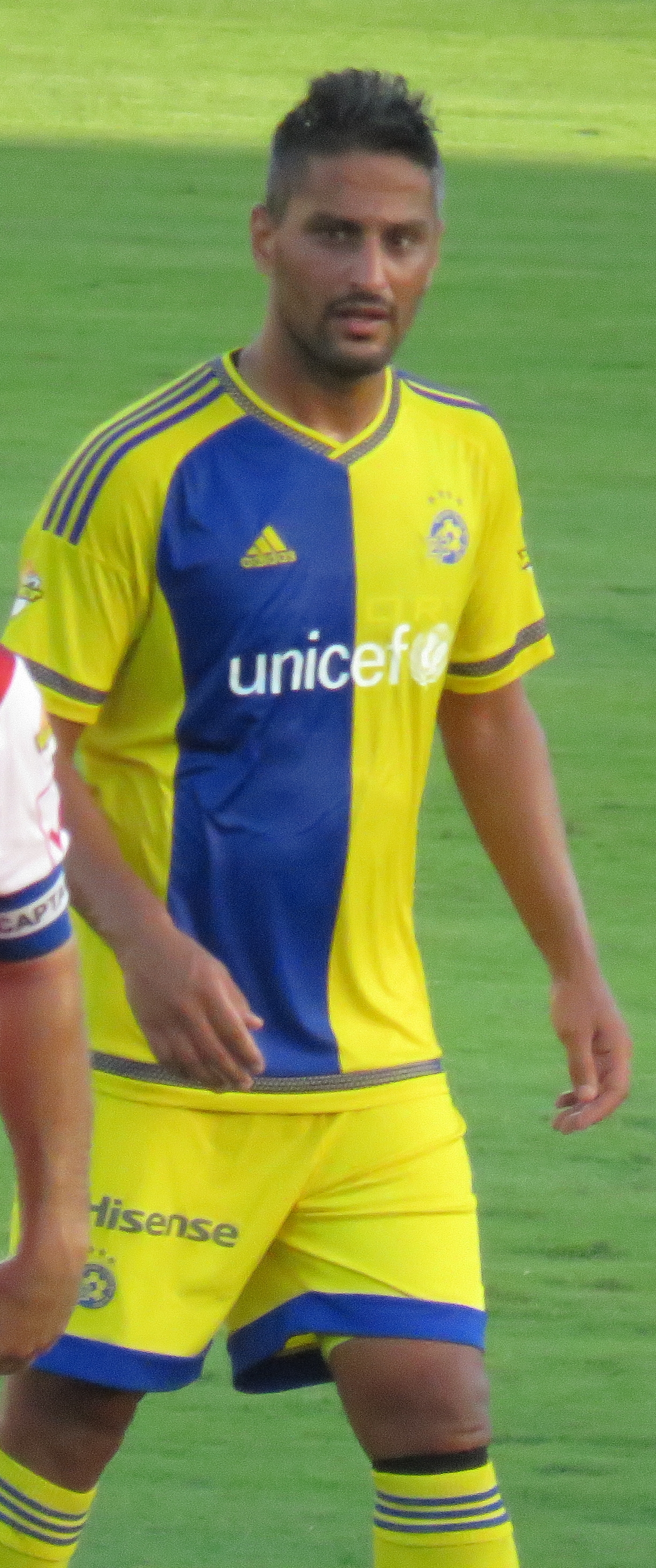
- Itzhaki playing for Maccabi Tel Aviv in 2015

Personal information
- Date of birth: September 25, 1984 (age 42)
- Place of birth: Ashkelon, Israel
- Height: 1.74 m (5 ft 9 in)
- Position: Striker

Youth career
- 2000–2001: Hapoel Ashkelon

Senior career*
Years	Team	Apps	(Gls)
2001–2003	Hapoel Ashkelon	57	(28)
2003–2007	Beitar Jerusalem	109	(24)
2007–2008	Racing Genk	15	(3)
2008–2010	Beitar Jerusalem	72	(30)
2010–2018	Maccabi Tel Aviv	102	(26)
2012–2013	→ Anorthosis Famagusta (loan)	23	(13)

International career
2003	Israel U19	1	(1)
2004–2007	Israel U21	19	(3)
2007–2009	Israel	11	(1)

Managerial career
- 2024–2026: Beitar Jerusalem
- 2026–: Anorthosis Famagusta
- * Club domestic league appearances and goals

Barak Itzhaki (or Itzchaki, Hebrew: ברק יצחקי; born September 25, 1984) is an Israeli former footballer and current manager of Anorthosis Famagusta. He mostly played as a second striker, but could also play an attacking midfielder.

== Early life ==
Itzhaki was born in Ashkelon, Israel, to a Jewish family.

== Career ==
Itzhaki started his professional career with boyhood club Hapoel Ashkelon. During his first two seasons as a professional, Itzhaki won the Toto Cup Artzit twice. He was sold to Beitar Jerusalem and saw limited time under manager Eli Ohana.

With the arrival of French manager Luis Fernández in 2005, Itzhaki received more playing time and was even a first team choice over the club's leading scorer, Lior Asulin. After watching Itzhaki play, Fernández told the club to sign Itzhaki to a long-term contract.

At the end of the 2005–06 season, Itzhaki attracted interest from Belgian club Racing Genk. Media reports say that he was offered a €300,000 per annum contract that includes a 20% yearly wage rise for a period no less than three seasons. Beitar was reluctant to see Itzhaki leave and they have put a price on the striker of no less than US$1,000,000. On June 25, 2006, an official bid was sent for the immediate transfer of Itzhaki but Beitar chairman Vladimir Sklar rejected the offer of US$250,000. While Itzhaki and the club were in training in Arnhem, the Netherlands, a representative of Racing Genk showed up at the hotel with an improved offer of US$500,000. It initially looked as if Itzhaki would be sold to the Belgian side but he eventually signed a long-term contract with Beitar. In January 2008, Itzhaki agreed a move to Racing Genk, where he signed a 3.5 year contract.

He scored his first Racing Genk goal in KV Mechelen, it is already named as the goal of the year in Belgium. After this goal he also scored against Moeskroen en Club Brugge.

In July 2008, Itzhaki returned earlier as planned to Beitar Jerusalem due to home sickness. Once back in Jerusalem he became the top scorer of the 2008–09 Israeli Premier League.

=== Maccabi Tel Aviv ===
On June 9, 2010, Itzhaki signed a five-year-contract with Maccabi Tel Aviv for a transfer fee of two million USD paid to Beitar. He made his official debut for Maccabi at the home win against FK Mogren at UEFA Europa League on July 15, 2010.

On August 22, 2010, Itzhaki suffered a serious injury to his ACL against Maccabi Haifa and wasn't able to play until May 7, 2011. He made his return, replacing Maor Buzaglo in a league match against Maccabi Haifa, the same team he played against when he got injured, 32 fixtures and almost 9 months after that injury. He scored his first league goal for Maccabi by a penalty shot in the 87th minute of the last game of the season against Maccabi Netanya.

In the summer of 2012 Itzhaki was loaned to Anorthosis Famagusta. In that season Itzhaki was a vital part of team, scoring 13 league goals in 23 matches. Barak was the last (loan) transfer of Anorthosis for the season 2012-13 and was the most helpful transfer of the year, he scored 13 goals in the league and helped the team to achieve the second place.

Towards 2013–14 Itzhaki returned to Maccabi Tel Aviv, making his first game for the club since his return in the UEFA Champions League qualifying game against Győri ETO and accomplishing a great comeback to the club by scoring an important away goal.

== Honours ==
Hapoel Ashkelon

- Toto Cup (Artzit): 2001–02, 2002–03

Beitar Jerusalem

- Israeli Premier League: 2006–07
- Israel State Cup: 2008–09
- Toto Cup: 2009–10

Anorthosis Famagusta

- Cypriot First Division runner-up: 2012–13

Maccabi Tel Aviv

- Israeli Premier League: 2013–14, 2014–15
- Israel State Cup: 2014–15
- Toto Cup: 2014–15, 2017–18

Individual

- Israeli Premier League top scorer: 2008–09
- UEFA's Goal of the Week: January 2014
