= Vladimir Broun =

Uzbek footballer (born 1989)

Personal information
- Full name: Vladimir Broun
- Date of birth: May 6, 1989 (age 37)
- Place of birth: Tashkent, Uzbek SSR, USSR
- Position: Defensive midfielder

Team information
- Current team: Hapoel Lod

Youth career
- Hapoel Ramat Gan

Senior career*
| Years | Team | Apps | (Gls) |
| 2008–2013 | Hapoel Ramat Gan | 78 | (1) |
| 2013–2016 | Ironi Kiryat Shmona | 74 | (2) |
| 2016–2018 | Hapoel Be'er Sheva | 36 | (1) |
| 2018 | → F.C. Ashdod (loan) | 10 | (1) |
| 2018–2019 | Ironi Kiryat Shmona | 23 | (0) |
| 2019–2020 | Hapoel Rishon LeZion | 27 | (0) |
| 2020–2021 | Hapoel Ramat Gan | 13 | (1) |
| 2021 | Sektzia Ness Ziona | 16 | (1) |
| 2021–2022 | Hapoel Rishon LeZion | 33 | (1) |
| 2022 | F.C. Tira | 6 | (1) |
| 2022–2023 | F.C. Tzeirei Tayibe | 13 | (2) |
| 2023–2024 | Hapoel Rishon LeZion | 33 | (2) |
| 2024–2026 | Hapoel Lod | 46 | (6) |
| 2026 | Hapoel Nir Ramat HaSharon | 0 | (0) |
| 2026– | Hapoel Lod | 0 | (0) |
- * Club domestic league appearances and goals as of 1 June 2026

Vladimir "Vova" Broun (Hebrew: ולדימיר "וובה" ברואון; born May 6, 1989) is an Uzbek footballer who plays as a defensive midfielder.

== Honours ==
=== Club ===
Hapoel Kiryat Shmona

- Israel Super Cup (1): 2015

Hapoel Be'er Sheva

- Israeli Premier League (1): 2015–16, 2016-17
- Israel Super Cup (1): 2016
- Toto Cup (1): 2016-17
