= Ahmed Abed =

Israeli footballer

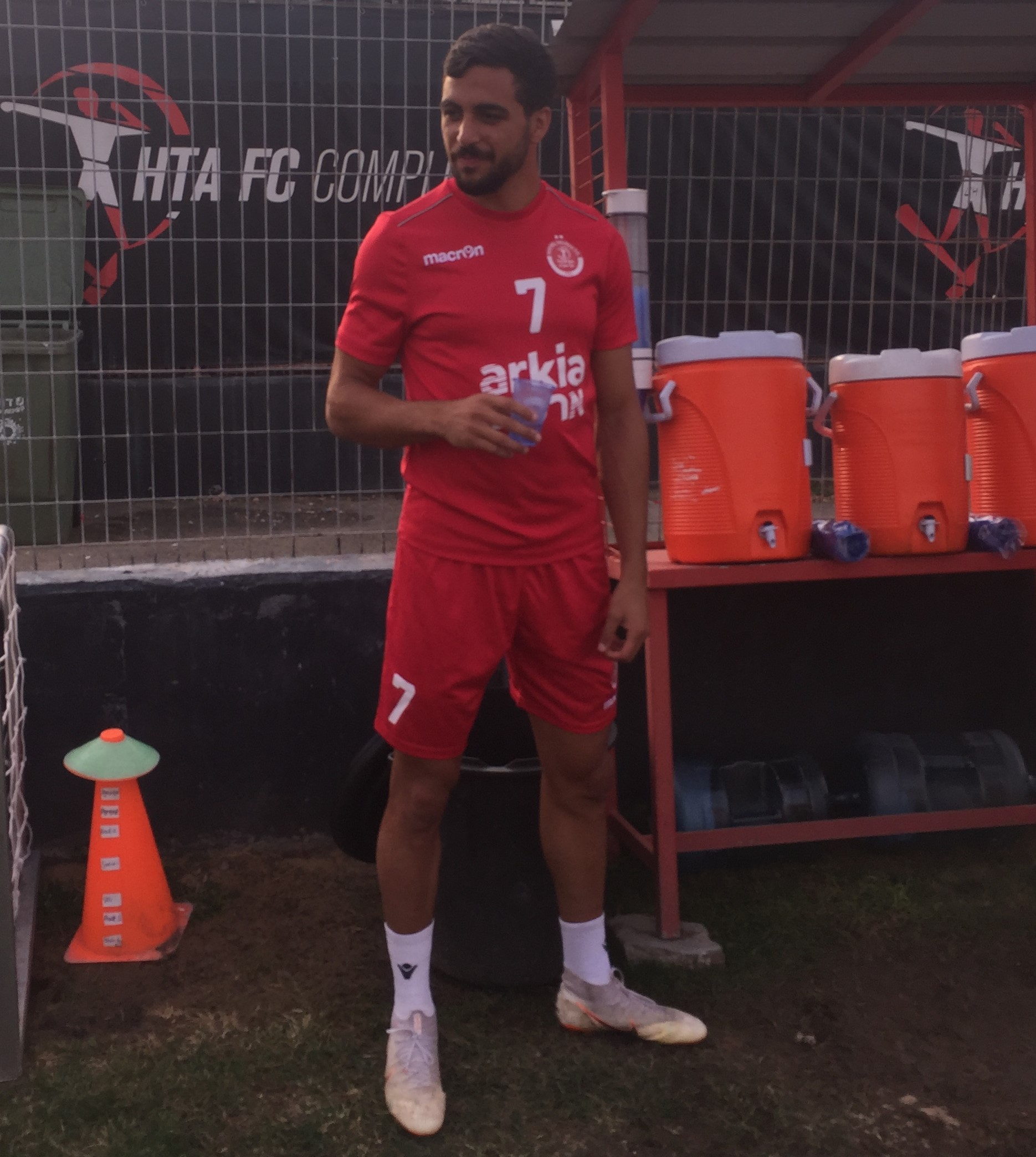
- Ahmad Abed in 2018

Personal information
- Full name: Ahmed Abed
- Date of birth: 30 March 1990 (age 36)
- Place of birth: Nazareth, Israel
- Height: 1.84 m (6 ft 1/2 in)
- Positions: Right midfielder; forward

Team information
- Current team: Hapoel Tel Aviv

Youth career
- Maccabi Akhi Nazareth

Senior career*
Years	Team	Apps	(Gls)
2008–2011	Maccabi Akhi Nazareth	41	(6)
2011–2018	Ironi Kiryat Shmona	202	(28)
2018	Giresunspor	8	(2)
2018–2019	Hapoel Tel Aviv	29	(4)
2020	Ironi Kiryat Shmona	13	(0)
2020–2022	Maccabi Akhi Nazareth	66	(15)
2022–2023	Maccabi Bnei Reineh	24	(2)
2023–2024	Ironi Tiberias	33	(9)
2024–	Hapoel Tel Aviv	20	(1)

International career
2012–2013	Israel U21	4	(0)
2016	Israel	1	(0)
- * Club domestic league appearances and goals as of 17 May 2023

Ahmed Abed (or Ahmad Abed, Arabic: أحمد عبد, Hebrew: אחמד עאבד; born March 30, 1990) is an Israeli footballer who plays as a forward for Liga Leumit club Hapoel Tel Aviv.

== Early life ==
Abed was born in Nazareth, Israel, to a Muslim-Arab family.

== Club career ==
Abed started his career at Maccabi Akhi Nazareth youth system. On December 31, 2008, he made his debut at the senior team against Hapoel Ra'anana.

In summer 2011 he moved to Hapoel Ironi Kiryat Shmona, he won with the club the Toto Cup and the Israeli Championship. On May 7, 2014, Abed scored the winning goal in the final Cup victory 1–0 against Maccabi Netanya at the 97th minute.

On January 29, Abed signed in Giresunspor.

== International career ==
On November 14, 2012, he made his debut at the Israel U21 against Belarus. Abed got his first call up to the senior Israel side for a 2018 FIFA World Cup qualifier against Macedonia in October 2016.

== Honours ==
=== Club ===
Hapoel Kiryat Shmona

- Israeli Premier League: 2011–12
- Israel State Cup: 2013–14
- Toto Cup Top Division: 2011-12
- Israel Super Cup: 2015
