= 2012–13 Maccabi Haifa F.C. season =

Maccabi Haifa
2012–13 season
- Chairman: Ya'akov Shahar
- Manager: Reuven Atar (until 13 November); Arik Benado (from 25 November)
- Stadium: Kiryat Eliezer
- Ligat Ha'Al: 2nd
- State Cup: Semi-final
- Toto Cup: Quarter-final
- Top goalscorer: League: Wiyam Amashe (11); All: Dino Ndlovu (15)
- Highest home attendance: 14,500 vs. Maccabi Tel Aviv (18 December 2012) and Hapoel Tel Aviv (27 January 2013)
- Lowest home attendance: 1,000 vs. Maccabi Netanya (12 December 2012)
- Average home league attendance: 11,062
Home colours	Away colours	Third colours

The 2012–13 season is Maccabi Haifa's 55th season in Israeli Premier League, and their 31st consecutive season in the top division of Israeli football.

== Club ==
=== Squad ===
No.	Name	Nationality	Position	Date of birth (age)	Signed from	Notes
1	Nir Davidovich	(Israel)	GK	December 17, 1976 (age 49)	(Israel) Youth Team	2nd Captain
2	Emri Zaid	(Israel)	DF	March 10, 1993 (age 33)	(Israel) Youth Team	eligible for youth team
3	Samuel Scheimann	(Israel)	DF	January 3, 1987 (age 39)	(Netherlands) SBV Excelsior	
4	Orel Dgani	(Israel)	DF	January 8, 1989 (age 37)	(Israel) Maccabi Netanya	
5	Liroy Zhairi	(Israel)	MF	March 2, 1989 (age 37)	(Belgium) KV Mechelen	
7	Gustavo Boccoli	(Brazil) (Israel)	MF	February 16, 1978 (age 48)	(Israel) Maccabi Ahi Nazareth	3rd Captain
8	Hen Ezra	(Israel)	MF	January 19, 1989 (age 37)	(Israel) Maccabi Netanya	
9	Shlomi Azulay	(Israel)	FW	October 18, 1989 (age 36)	(Israel) Hapoel Ironi Kiryat Shmona	
10	Idan Vered	(Israel)	MF	January 1, 1989 (age 37)	(Israel) Beitar Jerusalem	INJURED
11	Dela Yampolsky	(Israel)	MF	July 28, 1988 (age 37)	(Israel) Maccabi Netanya	
12	Dino Ndlovu	(South Africa)	FW	February 15, 1990 (age 36)	(Israel) Bnei Yehuda	INJURED
13	Taleb Twatiha	(Israel)	DF	June 21, 1992 (age 33)	(Israel) Youth Team	INJURED
14	Wiyam Amashe	(Israel)	FW	August 8, 1985 (age 40)	(Israel) Hapoel Ironi Kiryat Shmona	
15	Eyal Golasa	(Israel)	MF	October 7, 1991 (age 34)	(Israel) Youth Team	INJURED
16	Ismaeel Ryan	(Israel)	MF	April 24, 1994 (age 31)	(Israel) Youth Team	eligible for youth team
17	Alon Turgeman	(Israel)	FW	September 6, 1991 (age 34)	(Israel) Hapoel Petah Tikva	
18	Oded Elkayam	(Israel)	DF	February 9, 1988 (age 38)	(Israel) Bnei Sakhnin	
19	Daniel Haber	(Canada)	FW	January 1, 1993 (age 33)	(United States) Cornell University	
20	Yaniv Katan	(Israel)	MF	December 27, 1981 (age 44)	(England) West Ham United	Captain
21	Tamir Cohen	(Israel)	MF	March 4, 1984 (age 42)	(England) Bolton Wanderers	
22	Amir Edri	(Israel)	GK	July 26, 1985 (age 40)	(Israel) Maccabi Netanya	5th Captain
23	Jaber Ataa	(Israel)	MF	April 3, 1994 (age 31)	(Israel) Youth Team	eligible for youth team
24	Dekel Keinan	(Israel)	DF	September 15, 1984 (age 41)	(Wales) Cardiff City	4th Captain
25	Edin Cocalić	(Bosnia and Herzegovina)	DF	December 5, 1987 (age 38)	(Greece) Panionios	
26	Avihai Yadin	(Israel)	MF	October 26, 1986 (age 39)	(Israel) Hapoel Tel Aviv	INJURED
27	Eyal Meshumar	(Israel)	DF	August 10, 1983 (age 42)	(Israel) Hapoel Kfar Saba	
29	Andriy Pylyavskyi	(Ukraine)	DF	December 4, 1988 (age 37)	(Israel) Beitar Jerusalem	
33	Bojan Šaranov	(Serbia)	GK	September 22, 1987 (age 38)	(Serbia) OFK Beograd	
44	Ron Shushan	(Israel)	GK	June 11, 1993 (age 32)	(Israel) Youth Team	eligible for youth team

=== Players out on loan ===
Note: Flags indicate national team as defined under FIFA eligibility rules; some limited exceptions apply. Players may hold more than one non-FIFA nationality.

No.	Pos.	Nation	Player
—	FW	ISR	Mohammad Ghadir (at (Belgium) Beveren until 30 June 2013)
—	FW	ISR	Hen Azriel (at (Israel) Beitar Jerusalem until 30 June 2013)
—	MF	ISR	Sintayehu Sallalich (at (Israel) Ironi Kiryat Shmona until 30 June 2013)
—	DF	ISR	Ali Ottman (at (Israel) Bnei Sakhnin until 30 June 2013)
—	MF	ISR	Mohammed Kalibat (at (Israel) Bnei Sakhnin until 30 June 2013)
—	MF	ISR	Acram Sarich (at (Israel) Bnei Sakhnin until 30 June 2013)
—	DF	ISR	Sari Falah (at (Israel) Bnei Yehuda until 30 June 2013)
—	DF	ISR	Guy Lipka (at (Israel) Hapoel Haifa until 30 June 2013)
—	MF	ISR	Zidan Amar (at (Israel) Hapoel Acre until 30 June 2013)
—	MF	ISR	Noah Sadawe (at (Israel) Hapoel Kfar Saba F.C. until 30 June 2013)

No.	Pos.	Nation	Player
—	MF	ISR	Eran Malchin (at (Israel) Hapoel Nazareth Illit until 30 June 2013)
—	MF	ISR	Haythem Halabi (at (Israel) Hapoel Nazareth Illit until 30 June 2013)
—	MF	LTU	Martynas Dapkus (at (Israel) Hapoel Nazareth Illit until 30 June 2013)
—	GK	ISR	Ram Strauss (at (Israel) Maccabi Ahi Nazareth until 30 June 2013)
—	MF	ISR	Bar Abitan (at (Israel) Maccabi Ahi Nazareth until 30 June 2013)
—	MF	ISR	Ahmad Shaban (at (Israel) Hapoel Ra'anana until 30 June 2013)
—	MF	ISR	Eran Rozenbaum (at (Israel) Sektzia Nes Tziona until 30 June 2013)
—	DF	ISR	Arnon Rabinovich (at (Israel) Hapoel Herzliya until 30 June 2013)
—	DF	ISR	Gabriel Griner (at (Israel) Hapoel Herzliya until 30 June 2013)

== Transfers ==
=== Summer transfers ===
Players In
Name	Nat	Pos	Moving from
Samuel Scheimann	ISR	DF	(Netherlands) SBV Excelsior
Hen Ezra	ISR	MF	(Israel) Maccabi Netanya
Shlomi Azulay	ISR	FW	(Israel) Hapoel Ironi Kiryat Shmona
Oded Elkayam	ISR	DF	(Israel) Bnei Sakhnin
Amir Edri	ISR	GK	(Israel) Maccabi Netanya
Andriy Pylyavskyi	UKR	DF	(Israel) Beitar Jerusalem
Dino Ndlovu	RSA	FW	(Israel) Bnei Yehuda
Joel Damahou	(France) CIV	MF	(Israel) Bnei Sakhnin
Liroy Zhairi	ISR	MF	(Belgium) KV Mechelen
Dekel Keinan	ISR	DF	(Wales) Cardiff City
Avihai Yadin	ISR	MF	(Israel) Hapoel Tel Aviv

Players Out
Name	Nat	Pos	Moving to
Seidu Yahaya	GHA	MF	(Romania) FC Astra Ploiești
Haim Megrelashvili	ISR	DF	(Israel) Beitar Jerusalem
Hen Azriel	ISR	FW	(Israel) Beitar Jerusalem
Ali Ottman	ISR	DF	(Israel) Bnei Sakhnin
Sintayehu Sallalich	ISR	MF	(Israel) Hapoel Ironi Kiryat Shmona
Mohammad Ghadir	ISR	MF	(Belgium) Waasland-Beveren
Sari Falah	ISR	DF	(Israel) Bnei Yehuda
Itzik Cohen	ISR	DF	(Israel) Hapoel Ironi Kiryat Shmona
Danijel Cesarec	CRO	FW	(Croatia) HNK Rijeka
Jurica Buljat	CRO	DF	(Croatia) NK Zadar

=== Winter transfers ===
Players In
Name	Nat	Pos	Moving from
Daniel Haber	(Canada)	FW	(United States) Unionville Milliken Soccer Club
Noah Sadawe	(United States) (Israel)	FW	(United States) Newark Ironbound Express

Players Out
Name	Nat	Pos	Moving to
Joel Damahou	(France) (Ivory Coast)	MF	Free Agent
Noah Sadawe	(United States) (Israel)	MF	(Israel) Hapoel Kfar Saba

=== Current coaching staff ===
Position	Staff
Manager	(Israel) Arik Benado
Assistant manager	(Israel) Ori Uzan
First team coach	(Israel) Shmulik Hanin
Goalkeeping coach	(Israel) Avi Peretz
Fitness coach	(Israel) Harel Uri
Club Administrator	(Israel) Adoram Keisi
Chief Scout	(Israel) Alon Harazi
Club doctor	(Israel) Dr. Ami Berber
Club doctor	(Israel) Dr. Doron Kopelman
Club doctor	(Israel) Dr. Bezalel Fskin
Physiotherapist	(Israel) Pinny Sharon
Masseurs	(Israel) Alexandre Robichek
Equipment Manager	(Israel) Ze'ev Ikshin

Source: maccabi-haifafc.walla.co.il

== Pre-season and friendlies ==
17 July 2012 Friendly	FK Příbram (Czech Republic)	0-1	(Israel) Maccabi Haifa	Saalfelden, Austria
19:30		Report	Azulay 49''	Stadium: Saalfelden Training

19 July 2012 Friendly	Botev Plovdiv (Bulgaria)	2-1	(Israel) Maccabi Haifa	Saalfelden, Austria
19:30	Rahov 69''; Vieira 79''	Report	Katan 27''	Stadium: Saalfelden Training

22 July 2012 Friendly	Beşiktaş J.K. (Turkey)	0-2	(Israel) Maccabi Haifa	Saalfelden, Austria
19:30		Report	Katan 8''; Ezra 61''	Stadium: Saalfelden Training

24 July 2012 Friendly	Gaziantepspor (Turkey)	2–0	(Israel) Maccabi Haifa	Saalfelden, Austria
19:30	Tosun 19''; Özbayraktar 85''	Report		Stadium: Saalfelden Training

== Competitions ==
=== Ligat Ha'Al ===
==== Regular season ====
- With Reuven Atar

27 August 2012 1	Maccabi Tel Aviv	2 – 1	Maccabi Haifa	Tel Aviv, Israel
20:50	Dabour 7,55'; Ziv (yellow card) 44'; Alberman (yellow card) 88'	Report	Cohen (yellow card) 22'; Ezra 38'; Ezra (yellow card) 45'	Stadium: Bloomfield Stadium; Attendance: 14,500; Referee: Liran Liany

1 September 2012 2	Maccabi Haifa	1 – 3	Ironi Kiryat Shmona	Haifa, Israel
17:50	Ndlovu 19'; Cocalić (yellow card) 35'; Twatiha (yellow card) 75'; Golasa (yellow card) 76'	Report	Tasevski 53'; Gabai (yellow card) 69'; Lencse 75'; Abed 81'	Stadium: Kiryat Eliezer Stadium; Attendance: 12,000; Referee: Orel Greenfeld

15 September 2012 3	Hapoel Be'er Sheva	1 – 1	Maccabi Haifa	Be'er Sheva, Israel
20:50	Swisa 17'; Klemi Saban (yellow card) 55'	Report	Cocalić (yellow card) 29'; Azulay 38'; Twatiha (yellow card) 48'; Cocalić (red card) 49'	Stadium: Vasermil Stadium; Attendance: 7,000; Referee: Eli Hakmon

22 September 2012 4	Maccabi Haifa	0 – 1	F.C. Ashdod	Haifa, Israel
18:30	Damahou (yellow card) 33'	Report	Abd Elhamed (yellow card) 44'; Revivo 45'; Revivo (yellow card) 65'; Yeye (yellow card) 70'	Stadium: Kiryat Eliezer Stadium; Attendance: 11,000; Referee: Eitan Smuelavich

29 September 2012 5	Hapoel Acre	0 – 0	Maccabi Haifa	Acre, Israel
18:00	Gomez (yellow card) 30'; Taga (yellow card) 66'	Report	Damahou (yellow card) 60'	Stadium: Acre Municipal Stadium; Attendance: 5,000; Referee: Eitn Tabrizi

6 October 2012 6	Maccabi Haifa	2 - 0	Hapoel Ramat Gan	Haifa, Israel
17:40	Ndlovu (yellow card) 26'; Ndlovu 44'; Twatiha (yellow card) 87'; Vered 91'	Report	Itoua (yellow card) 32'; Zaguri (red card); Sidibé (yellow card) 50'; Itoua (red card) 88'	Stadium: Kiryat Eliezer Stadium; Attendance: 10,000; Referee: Roei Rainsriber

22 October 2012 7	Hapoel Tel Aviv	3 - 0	Maccabi Haifa	Tel Aviv, Israel
20:50	Ben Haim 36'; Damari 44'; Tamuz (yellow card) 72'; Haimovich (yellow card) 80'; Hutba (yellow card) 81'; Maman 90'; Maman (yellow card) 90'	Report	Damahou (yellow card) 45'; Keinan (yellow card) 64'; Twatiha (yellow card) 71'	Stadium: Bloomfield Stadium; Attendance: 14,000; Referee: Eli Hakmon

5 November 2012 8	Maccabi Haifa	1 - 1	Bnei Yehuda Tel Aviv	Haifa, Israel
19:30	Ndlovu 9'; Ndlovu (yellow card) 9'; Keinan (yellow card) 30'; Yadin (yellow card) 85'	Report	Falah (yellow card) 30'; Ivaškevičius 57'	Stadium: Kiryat Eliezer Stadium; Attendance: 11,000; Referee: Shai Shitrit

10 November 2012 9	Ironi Ramat HaSharon	1 - 1	Maccabi Haifa	Ramat HaSharon, Israel
18:00	Baldout 37'; Fernandez (yellow card) 43'; Miliev (yellow card) 51'; Musa (yellow card) 70'; Ben Shabat (yellow card) 73'; Or Ostvind (yellow card) 86'	Report	Keinan 30'; Meshumar (yellow card) 36'	Stadium: Grundman Stadium; Attendance: 2,000; Referee: Roei Rainsriber

- With Arik Benado

19 November 2012 10	Maccabi Haifa	0 - 0	Bnei Sakhnin	Haifa, Israel
21:00	Yadin (yellow card) 67'	Report	Kasoum (yellow card) 41'	Stadium: Kiryat Eliezer Stadium; Attendance: 10,000; Referee: Ziv Adler

26 November 2012 11	Beitar Jerusalem	1 - 2	Maccabi Haifa	Jerusalem, Israel
20:50	Moyal 37'; Moyal (yellow card) 75'; Levy (yellow card) 90'	Report	Megrelashvili 13' (o.g.); Pylyavskyi (yellow card) 23'; Golasa (yellow card) 34'; Ezra 42'	Stadium: Teddy Stadium; Attendance: 16,000; Referee: Menhsa Masiah

2 December 2012 12	Hapoel Haifa	0 - 3	Maccabi Haifa	Haifa, Israel
20:15	Tzarfati (yellow card) 37'; Abukarat (yellow card) 58'; Azam (yellow card) 62'; Denković (yellow card) 90'; Dora (yellow card) 90'	Report	Yadin (yellow card) 36'; Golasa 57'; Amashe 74'; Ezra 76'; Zhairi (yellow card) 90'	Stadium: Kiryat Eliezer Stadium; Attendance: 8,000; Referee: Liran Liany

8 December 2012 13	Maccabi Haifa	1 - 0	Maccabi Netanya	Haifa, Israel
19:30	Katan 23'; Meshumar (yellow card) 26'; Cocalić (yellow card) 73'	Report	Binyamin (yellow card) 32'; Ćeran (yellow card) 32'; Ćeran (red card) 49'	Stadium: Kiryat Eliezer Stadium; Attendance: 11,000; Referee: Orel Greenfeld

15 December 2012 14	Maccabi Haifa	1 - 0	Maccabi Tel Aviv	Haifa, Israel
20:50	Ezra (yellow card) 42'; Meshumar (yellow card) 48'; Amashe 81'; Vered (yellow card) 82'; Yadin (yellow card) 88'	Report	García (yellow card) 38'; Gonzalo (yellow card) 44'; Alberman (yellow card) 51'; Dahan (yellow card) 67'	Stadium: Kiryat Eliezer Stadium; Attendance: 14,500; Referee: Eli Hakmon

24 December 2012 15	Ironi Kiryat Shmona	0 - 0	Maccabi Haifa	Kiryat Shmona, Israel
20:50	Rochet (yellow card) 50'; Abuhatzira (yellow card) 85'	report	Scheimann (yellow card) 50'; Golasa (yellow card) 60'; Keinan (yellow card) 65'; Yadin (yellow card) 71'	Stadium: Kiryat Shmona Municipal Stadium; Attendance: 4,500; Referee: Alon Yefet

29 December 2012 16	Maccabi Haifa	2 - 0	Hapoel Be'er Sheva	Haifa, Israel
20:00	Meshumar (yellow card) 25'; Yadin (yellow card) 36'; Amashe 69'; Azulay 72'	Report	Markovic (yellow card) 35'; Swisa (yellow card) 71'	Stadium: Kiryat Eliezer Stadium; Attendance: 10,000; Referee: Roei Rainsriber

6 January 2013 17	F.C. Ashdod	1 - 4	Maccabi Haifa	Ashdod, Israel
20:15	Ben-Shimon (yellow card) 34'; Abd Elhamed 56'; Yeye (yellow card) 71'	Report	Boccoli (yellow card) 2'; Golasa 39'; Cocalić (yellow card) 67'; Golasa (yellow card) 70'; Ezra 75'; Meshumar 92'; Turgeman 94'	Stadium: Yud-Alef Stadium; Attendance: 6,700; Referee: Ziv Edlar

12 January 2013 18	Maccabi Haifa	3 - 1	Hapoel Acre	Haifa, Israel
20:00	Ezra 58, 83'; Ezra (yellow card) 68'; Amashe 72'	Report	Abu Raiya 21'; Ben Dayan (yellow card) 34'; Cohen (yellow card) 70'; Kahlon (yellow card) 74'	Stadium: Kiryat Eliezer Stadium; Attendance: 9,000; Referee: Liran Liany

20 January 2013 19	Hapoel Ramat Gan	0 - 3	Maccabi Haifa	Ramat Gan, Israel
20:15	Brown (yellow card) 59'; Zaguri (yellow card) 64'	Report	Amashe 18'; Twatiha 28'; Golasa (yellow card) 29'; Azulay 70'; Twatiha (yellow card) 75'	Stadium: Ramat Gan Stadium; Attendance: 4,800; Referee: Shai Shitrit

27 January 2013 20	Maccabi Haifa	3 - 0	Hapoel Tel Aviv	Haifa, Israel
20:50	Keinan 14, 34'; Turgeman 56'	Report	Maman (yellow card) 28'; Harush (yellow card) 35'; Pavićević (yellow card) 38'; Badir (yellow card) 50'; Hutba (yellow card) 79'; Toama (yellow card) 89'	Stadium: Kiryat Eliezer Stadium; Attendance: 14,500; Referee: Daniel Bar Natan

3 February 2013 21	Bnei Yehuda Tel Aviv	2 - 0	Maccabi Haifa	Tel Aviv, Israel
20:50	Meshumar (yellow card) 45'; Katan (yellow card) 87'; Cocalić (yellow card) 89'	Report	Galván 20'; Aiyenugba (yellow card) 64'; Azuz (yellow card) 78'; Zamir 85'; Zamir (yellow card) 86'	Stadium: Bloomfield Stadium; Attendance: 5,000; Referee: Liran Liany

9 February 2013 22	Maccabi Haifa	4 - 0	Ironi Ramat HaSharon	Haifa, Israel
19:30	Ndlovu 5'; Katan 26'; Pylyavskyi (yellow card) 40'; Azulay 88, 90'	Report	Anđelković (yellow card) 13'; Lipenia (yellow card) 49'	Stadium: Kiryat Eliezer Stadium; Attendance: 10,000; Referee: Eitan Smuelavich

16 February 2013 23	Bnei Sakhnin	0 - 1	Maccabi Haifa	Sakhnin, Israel
19:30	Lukman (yellow card) 44'; Abu Saleh (yellow card) 49'	Report	Ataa (yellow card) 26'; Amashe 47'; Ataa (red card) 66'	Stadium: Doha Stadium; Attendance: 3,500; Referee: Roei Rainsriber

24 February 2013 24	Maccabi Haifa	4 - 1	Beitar Jerusalem	Haifa, Israel
20:50	Keinan (yellow card) 13'; Katan 28'; Amashe 28,65'; Turgeman 94'	Report	Haddad (yellow card) 24'; Pylyavskyi 44' (o.g.); Moyal (yellow card) 67'; Cohen) (yellow card) 71'; Sadayev (yellow card) 77'	Stadium: Kiryat Eliezer Stadium; Attendance: 12,000; Referee: Eli Hakmon

4 March 2013 25	Maccabi Haifa	1 - 1	Hapoel Haifa	Haifa, Israel
20:50	Amashe 18'; Katan (yellow card) 30'; Twatiha (yellow card) 85'	Report	Nikolic (yellow card) 14'; Dora (yellow card) 20'; Avidor (yellow card) 28'; Harel (yellow card) 58'; Abukarat 74'; Gluščević (yellow card) 85'	Stadium: Kiryat Eliezer Stadium; Attendance: 12,000; Referee: Daniel Bar Natan

9 March 2013 26	Maccabi Netanya	1 - 2	Maccabi Haifa	Netanya, Israel
19:30	Saba'a 24'; Pinheiro (yellow card) 30'; Binyamin (yellow card) 74'; El-Khatib (yellow card) 86'	Report	Cennamo 29' (o.g.); Golasa (yellow card) 41'; Ndlovu (yellow card) 57'; Boccoli (yellow card) 71'; Amashe 81'; Šaranov (yellow card) 90'	Stadium: Netanya Stadium; Attendance: 9,000; Referee: Erez Papier

===== Table =====
Pos	Team	Pld	W	D	L	GF	GA	GD	Pts	Qualification
1	Maccabi Tel Aviv	26	19	2	5	61	20	+41	59	Qualification for the championship round
2	Maccabi Haifa	26	14	7	5	41	20	+21	49	Qualification for the championship round
3	Ironi Kiryat Shmona	26	11	10	5	34	25	+9	43	Qualification for the championship round
4	Hapoel Tel Aviv	26	12	6	8	33	29	+4	42	Qualification for the championship round
5	Bnei Yehuda	26	11	5	10	35	31	+4	38	Qualification for the championship round

Source: Israel Football Association
Rules for classification: 1st points; 2nd goal difference; 3rd matches won; 4th goals scored; 5th head-to-head; 6th decision match

==== Play-off ====
17 March 2013 27	Maccabi Haifa	1 - 0	Bnei Yehuda Tel Aviv	Haifa, Israel
20:50	Boccoli (yellow card) 36'; Keinan (yellow card) 57'; Katan (yellow card) 89'; Pylyavskyi 94', (yellow card) 94'	Report	Cohen (yellow card) 49'	Stadium: Kiryat Eliezer Stadium; Attendance: 9,000; Referee: Liran Liany

30 March 2013 28	Maccabi Tel Aviv	0 - 0	Maccabi Haifa	Tel Aviv, Israel
20:50	Prica (yellow card) 59'; Ziv (yellow card) 63'	Report	Twatiha (yellow card) 24'; Pylyavskyi (yellow card) 57'; Meshumar (yellow card) 64'; Ndlovu (yellow card) 72'	Stadium: Bloomfield Stadium; Attendance: 14,500; Referee: Alon Yefet

2 April 2013 29	Maccabi Haifa	6 - 0	Ironi Ramat HaSharon	Haifa, Israel
19:30	Ndlovu 6, 49, 66, 69'; Twatiha 21'; Boccoli (yellow card) 45'; Amashe 89'	Report	Mansharov (yellow card) 19'; Barel (yellow card) 51'; Anđelković (yellow card) 78'	Stadium: Kiryat Eliezer Stadium; Attendance: 5,000; Referee: Erez Papier

6 April 2013 30	Maccabi Haifa	3 - 2	Ironi Kiryat Shmona	Haifa, Israel
20:30	Ezra 43'; Keinan 58', (yellow card) 90'; Azulay 86'; Zhairi (yellow card) 88'	Report	Rochet 28'; Tzedek 72', (yellow card) 39'; Mawuli (yellow card) 40'; Abed (yellow card) 44'; Gabai (yellow card) 63'	Stadium: Kiryat Eliezer Stadium; Attendance: 9,000; Referee: Halim Zatma

13 April 2013 31	Hapoel Tel Aviv	2 - 2	Maccabi Haifa	Tel Aviv, Israel
15:30	Abutbul 15, 62'	Report	Cohen (yellow card) 10'; Ndlovu 31', (yellow card) 92'; Azulay 61'; Elkayam (yellow card) 68'; Cocalić (yellow card) 83'	Stadium: Bloomfield Stadium; Attendance: 8,500; Referee: Liran Liany

21 April 2013 32	Bnei Yehuda Tel Aviv	2 - 1	Maccabi Haifa	Tel Aviv, Israel
20:00	Zamir 15'; Hrepka 39'	Report	Ezra 30'; Boccoli (yellow card) 33'; Katan (yellow card) 66'; Dgani (yellow card) 81'	Stadium: Bloomfield Stadium; Attendance: 2,500; Referee: Eitan Smuelavich

29 April 2013 33	Maccabi Haifa	2 - 2	Maccabi Tel Aviv	Haifa, Israel
20:50	Boccoli (red card) 21'; Keinan 53'; Ezra 54'; Dgani (yellow card) 79'	Report	Gonzalo 22, 41'; Abu-Zaid (yellow card) 57'; García (yellow card) 73'; Fideleff (yellow card) 82'	Stadium: Kiryat Eliezer Stadium; Attendance: 9,000; Referee: Oren Saminien

5 May 2013 34	Ironi Ramat HaSharon	2 - 1	Maccabi Haifa	Ramat HaSharon, Israel
20:00	Mansharov (yellow card) 3'; Taka 19'; Barel (yellow card) 30'; Abutbul 56'; Lavi (yellow card) 80'	Report	Daniel Haber 63'	Stadium: Grundman Stadium; Attendance: 400; Referee: Halim Zatma

11 May 2013 35	Ironi Kiryat Shmona	1 - 2	Maccabi Haifa	Kiryat Shmona, Israel
17:00	Abuhatzira (yellow card) 14' (goal) 89'; Abudi (yellow card) 17'; Gerzicich (yellow card) 42'	Report	Ryan 4'; Turgeman 14'; Keinan (yellow card) 23'; Ataa (yellow card) 43'	Stadium: Kiryat Shmona Municipal Stadium; Attendance: 1,200; Referee: Gal Leibovich

18 May 2013 36	Maccabi Haifa	3 - 2	Hapoel Tel Aviv	Haifa, Israel
19:45	Boccoli (yellow card) 43'; Scheimann (yellow card) 44'; Turgeman 48'; Katan 74'; Haber 63'	Report	Sfuri 36'; Danin (yellow card) 41'; Badir 50'; Cohen (yellow card) 56'	Stadium: Kiryat Eliezer Stadium; Attendance: 12,000; Referee: Erez Papier

===== Table =====
Pos	Team	Pld	W	D	L	GF	GA	GD	Pts	Qualification
1	Maccabi Tel Aviv (C)	36	25	5	6	78	30	+48	80	Qualification for the Champions League second qualifying round
2	Maccabi Haifa	36	19	10	7	62	33	+29	67	Qualification for the Europa League second qualifying round
3	Hapoel Tel Aviv	36	17	7	12	47	45	+2	58	Qualification for the Europa League second qualifying round
4	Bnei Yehuda	36	16	7	13	50	40	+10	55	
5	Ironi Kiryat Shmona	36	14	11	11	45	38	+7	53	
6	Ironi Nir Ramat HaSharon	36	12	4	20	31	50	−19	40	

Source: Israel Football Association
Rules for classification: 1st points; 2nd goal difference; 3rd matches won; 4th goals scored; 5th head-to-head; 6th decision match
(C) Champions

==== Results summary ====
Overall								Home						Away					
Pld	W	D	L	GF	GA	GD	Pts	W	D	L	GF	GA	GD	W	D	L	GF	GA	GD
36	19	10	7	62	33	+29	67	12	4	2	38	14	+24	7	6	5	24	19	+5

Last updated: 3 February 2013.
Source: Competitive matches

==== Results by round ====
Round	1	2	3	4	5	6	7	8	9	10	11	12	13	14	15	16	17	18	19	20	21	22	23	24	25	26	27	28	29	30	31	32	33	34	35	36
Ground	A	H	A	H	A	H	A	H	A	H	A	A	H	H	A	H	A	H	A	H	A	H	A	H	H	A	H	A	H	H	A	A	H	A	A	H
Result	L	L	D	L	D	W	L	D	D	D	W	W	W	W	D	W	W	W	W	W	L	W	W	W	D	W	W	D	W	W	D	L	D	L	W	W
Position	12	14	12	12	12	12	12	13	13	12	11	9	8	7	7	6	3	3	3	2	2	2	2	2	2	2	2	2	2	2	2	2	2	2	2	2

Updated to match(es) played on 28 January 2013. Source: Competitive Matches
A = Away; H = Home; W = Win; D = Draw; L = Loss

=== Israel State Cup ===
30 January 2013 Round of 32	Hapoel Azor	0 - 4	Maccabi Haifa	Rishon leZion, Israel
19:00	Bocarov (yellow card) 39'	Report	Amashe 39'; Azulay 51'; Ndlovu 72'; Turgeman 78'	Stadium: Haberfeld Stadium; Attendance: 3,000; Referee: Halim Zatma

27 February 2013 Round of 16	Maccabi Haifa	2 - 1	Hapoel Haifa	Haifa, Israel
19:00	Turgeman 42'; Keinan (yellow card) 60'; Ndlovu 89'	Report	Brković (yellow card) 27'; Azam (yellow card) 30'; Pinas (yellow card) 48'; Dora (yellow card) 73'; Gluščević (yellow card) 78'; Harel 90'	Stadium: Kiryat Eliezer Stadium; Attendance: 10,000; Referee: Eitn Tabrizi

13 March 2013 Quarter-final	Beitar Jerusalem	0 - 3	Maccabi Haifa	Jerusalem, Israel
20:00	Megrelashvili (yellow card) 16'; Moyal (yellow card) 30'; Kriaf (red card) 84'	Report	Twatiha 25'; Meshumar (yellow card) 38'; Amashe 51'; Boccoli (yellow card) 78'; Ndlovu 72'; Zhairi (yellow card) 89'	Stadium: Teddy Stadium; Attendance: 12,000; Referee: Alon Yefet

17 April 2013 Semi Final	Ironi Kiryat Shmona	2 - 1	Maccabi Haifa	Ramat Gan, Israel
20:30	Matović (yellow card) 21'; Abuhatzira (yellow card) 27'; Abed 71'; Tzedek (yellow card) 77'; Mawuli 111'	Report	Ndlovu 23', (yellow card) 90'; Cocalić (yellow card) 29'; Dgani (yellow card) 58'	Stadium: Ramat Gan Stadium; Attendance: 25,000; Referee: Eli Hakmon

=== Toto Cup ===
==== Group stage ====
4 August 2012 1	Maccabi Haifa	0-0	Hapoel Haifa	Haifa, Israel
19:00	Cocalić (yellow card) 58'	Report	Tartazky (yellow card) 46'; Avidor (yellow card) 90'	Stadium: Kiryat Eliezer Stadium; Attendance: 14,000; Referee: Alon Yefet

7 August 2012 2	Hapoel Acre	1-1	Maccabi Haifa	Sakhnin, Israel
20:50	Gomez 39'	Report	Pylyavskyi 90'	Stadium: Doha Stadium; Attendance: 200; Referee: Menhsa Masiah

18 August 2012 3	Maccabi Haifa	6-0	Bnei Sakhnin	Haifa, Israel
20:50	Meshumar 19'; Meshumar (yellow card) 27'; Cocalić (yellow card) 40'; Katan 43'; Vered 50'; Ndlovu 64, 87'; Turgeman 75'	Report	Mbemba (yellow card) 43'; Khalaila (yellow card) 55'	Stadium: Kiryat Eliezer Stadium; Attendance: 5,000; Referee: Eli Hakmon

10 September 2012 4	Ironi Kiryat Shmona	0-2	Maccabi Haifa	Kiryat Shmona, Israel
19:00	Elisha (yellow card) 19'	Report	Boccoli (yellow card) 16'; Meshumar 21'; Boccoli (red card) 24'; Yampolsky 30'	Stadium: Kiryat Shmona Municipal Stadium; Attendance: 1,100; Referee: Daniel Bar Natan

Pos	Team	Pld	W	D	L	GF	GA	GD	Pts
1	Maccabi Haifa (A)	4	2	2	0	9	1	+8	8
2	Ironi Kiryat Shmona (A)	4	2	1	1	4	3	+1	7
3	Hapoel Haifa (A)	4	1	3	0	5	4	+1	6
4	Bnei Sakhnin	4	1	0	3	5	10	−5	3
5	Hapoel Acre	4	0	2	2	2	6	−4	2

Source: football.org.il (in Hebrew)
Rules for classification: 1st points; 2nd goal difference; 3rd matches won; 4th goals scored; 5th head-to-head; 6th decision match
(A) Advanced to the quarterfinals

==== Knockout phase ====
28 November 2012 Quarter-final; First Leg	Maccabi Netanya	3 - 2	Maccabi Haifa	Netanya, Israel
20:50	Amashe 38'; Damahou (yellow card) 34'; Zhairi 38'; Habashi (yellow card) 90'	Report	Shriki 67'; Gabay 86'; Peretz 90'; Peretz (yellow card) 90'	Stadium: Netanya Stadium; Attendance: 200; Referee: Erez Papier

11 December 2012 Quarter-final; Second Leg	Maccabi Haifa	1 - 1	Maccabi Netanya	Haifa, Israel
20:35	Ryan 5'	Report	Ben Harush 38'; Cohen (yellow card) 88'; Cennamo (yellow card) 90'	Stadium: Kiryat Eliezer Stadium; Attendance: 1000; Referee: Eitan Smuelavich

Maccabi Netanya won 4-3 on aggregate

== Squad statistics ==
Updated on 30 Jen. 2013

			Ligat Ha'Al				State Cup				Toto Cup				Total			
Nation	No.	Name	GS	App.	Min.	Goal	GS	App.	Min.	Goal	GS	App.	Min.	Goal	GS	App.	Min.	Goal
Goalkeepers
(Israel)	1	Nir Davidovich	2	2	180	0	0	0	0	0	3	3	248	0	5	5	428	0
(Israel)	22	Amir Edri	7	6	541	0	0	0	0	0	3	4	292	0	9	11	833	0
(Serbia)	33	Bojan Šaranov	28	28	2,520	0	4	4	390	0	0	0	0	0	32	32	3,010	0
(Israel)	44	Ron Shushan	0	0	0	0	0	0	0	0	0	0	0	0	0	0	0	0
Defenders
(Israel)	2	Habshi Eied	1	1	90	0	0	0	0	0	1	1	90	0	2	2	180	0
(Israel)	3	Samuel Scheimann	14	15	1,292	0	2	2	98	0	4	5	194	0	19	23	1,594	0
(Israel)	4	Orel Dgani	11	14	1,061	0	2	2	210	0	1	1	90	0	14	14	1,361	0
(Israel)	13	Taleb Twatiha	20	21	1,682	2	2	2	180	1	1	1	45	0	23	24	2,106	3
(Israel)	18	Oded Elkayam	4	5	431	0	1	1	112	0	3	5	93	0	7	11	797	0
(Israel)	24	Dekel Keinan	30	30	2,429	5	3	3	300	0	2	2	135	0	34	34	2,774	5
(Bosnia and Herzegovina)	25	Edin Cocalić	24	25	2,042	0	1	1	120	0	4	5	315	0	29	31	2,317	0
(Israel)	27	Eyal Meshumar	23	23	1,999	1	2	2	180	0	3	5	309	2	28	31	2,490	3
(Ukraine)	29	Andriy Pylyavskyi	15	15	1,300	1	3	3	270	0	5	5	540	1	22	22	1,730	2
(Israel)	-	Emri Zaid	0	0	0	0	0	0	0	0	0	2	14	0	0	2	14	0
(Israel)	-	Youval Yossipovich	0	0	0	0	0	0	0	0	0	1	35	0	0	1	35	0
Midfielders
(Israel)	5	Liroy Zhairi	6	19	663	0	0	2	39	0	1	1	73	1	8	22	775	1
(Brazil) (Israel)	7	Gustavo Boccoli	22	23	1,663	0	4	4	359	0	3	4	174	0	28	30	1,986	0
(Israel)	8	Hen Ezra	34	35	2,604	9	4	4	390	0	2	4	233	0	39	43	3,447	9
(Israel)	10	Idan Vered	7	17	846	1	0	0	0	0	4	4	266	1	11	21	1,112	2
(Israel)	11	Dela Yampolsky	3	9	348	0	1	1	90	0	4	6	366	1	7	18	805	0
(Israel)	15	Eyal Golasa	28	30	2,414	2	3	3	270	0	3	3	258	0	'35	36	2,753	2
(Israel)	16	Ismaeel Ryan	2	4	150	1	0	0	0	0	2	2	99	1	4	6	249	2
(Israel)	20	Yaniv Katan	32	34	2,694	4	3	3	296	0	3	3	225	1	39	40	3,125	5
(Israel)	21	Tamir Cohen	3	3	213	0	1	1	45	0	2	3	210	0	5	7	468	0
(Israel)	23	Jaber Ataa	3	8	336	0	1	2	76	0	0	0	0	0	4	10	412	0
(Israel)	26	Avihai Yadin	12	16	1,155	0	0	1	30	0	0	0	0	0	12	17	1,185	0
(Israel)	-	Dor Kochav	0	0	0	0	0	0	0	0	0	1	17	0	0	1	17	0
(Israel)	-	Adi Kostantinos	0	1	22	0	0	0	0	0	0	1	17	0	0	2	39	0
(Israel)	-	Micha Luta	0	0	0	0	0	0	0	0	0	2	50	0	0	2	50	0
(Ivory Coast) (France)	-	Joel Damahou	6	6	476	0	0	0	0	0	1	1	180	0	8	8	656	0
Forwards
(Israel)	9	Shlomi Azulay	14	29	1,198	7	2	4	176	1	1	4	184	0	16	36	1,603	7
(South Africa)	12	Dino Ndlovu	19	22	1,429	9	1	4	195	4	9	1	37	2	19	26	1,661	15
(Israel)	14	Wiyam Amashe	19	23	1,798	11	3	4	240	2	4	5	271	1	26	39	2,473	14
(Israel)	17	Alon Turgeman	11	21	914	5	2	3	184	2	4	6	330	1	17	28	2,268	9
(Canada)	19	Daniel Haber	0	4	101	2	0	0	0	0	0	0	0	0	0	4	101	2
(Israel)	-	Shoval Gozlan	0	1	26	0	0	0	0	0	0	1	22	0	0	2	48	0

=== Goals ===
Rank	Player	Position	Ligat Ha'Al	State Cup	Toto Cup	Total
1	(South Africa) Dino Ndlovu	FW	9	4	2	15
2	(Israel) Wiyam Amashe	FW	11	2	1	14
3	(Israel) Hen Ezra	MF	9	0	0	9
3	(Israel) Alon Turgeman	FW	6	2	1	9
5	(Israel) Shlomi Azulay	FW	6	1	0	7
6	(Israel) Dekel Keinan	DF	5	0	0	5
6	(Israel) Yaniv Katan	MF	4	0	1	5
8	(Israel) Taleb Twatiha	DF	2	1	0	3
8	(Israel) Eyal Meshumar	DF	1	0	2	3
10	(Canada) Daniel Haber	FW	2	0	0	2
10	(Israel) Idan Vered	MF	1	0	1	2
10	(Ukraine) Andriy Pylyavskyi	DF	1	0	1	2
10	(Israel) Ismaeel Ryan	MF	1	0	1	2
14	(Israel) Liroy Zhairi	MF	0	0	1	1
14	(Israel) Dela Yampolsky	MF	0	0	1	1
Own goals			2	0	0	2
Total			62	10	12	84

=== Disciplinary record ===
No.	Pos.	Name	Ligat Ha'Al		State Cup		Total	
No.	Pos.	Name	Booked	Sent off (straight red)	Booked	Sent off (straight red)	Booked	Sent off (straight red)
24	DF	Dekel Keinan	7	0	1	0	8	0
13	DF	Taleb Twatiha	7	0	0	0	7	0
27	DF	Eyal Meshumar	6	0	1	0	7	0
7	MF	Gustavo Boccoli	7	1	0	0	7	1
15	MF	Eyal Golasa	6	0	0	0	6	0
26	MF	Avihai Yadin	6	0	0	0	6	0
12	FW	Dino Ndlovu	5	0	1	0	6	0
25	DF	Edin Cocalić	5	1	1	0	6	1
29	DF	Andriy Pylyavskyi	4	0	0	0	4	0
20	MF	Yaniv Katan	4	0	0	0	4	0
4	DF	Orel Dgani	4	0	1	0	5	0
5	MF	Liroy Zhairi	2	0	1	0	3	0
8	MF	Hen Ezra	3	0	0	0	3	0
44	GK	Ron Shushan	3	1	0	0	3	1
2	DF	Emri Zaid	3	0	0	0	3	0
21	MF	Tamir Cohen	2	0	0	0	2	0
3	DF	Samuel Scheimann	2	0	0	0	2	0
10	MF	Idan Vered	1	0	0	0	1	0
11	MF	Dela Yampolsky	1	0	0	0	1	0
18	DF	Oded Elkayam	1	0	0	0	1	0
33	GK	Bojan Šaranov	1	0	0	0	1	0
23	MF	Jaber Ataa	1	1	0	0	0	2
Total			71	2	7	0	87	2

==== Penalties ====
Date	Penalty Taker	Scored	Opponent	Competition
22 October 2012	Yaniv Katan	No	Hapoel Tel Aviv	Ligat Ha'Al
8 December 2012	Yaniv Katan	Yes	Maccabi Netanya	Ligat Ha'Al
9 February 2013	Weaam Amasha	Yes	Beitar Jerusalem F.C.	Ligat Ha'Al
24 February 2013	Yaniv Katan	No	Ironi Ramat HaSharon	Ligat Ha'Al
4 March 2013	Weaam Amasha	Yes	Hapoel Haifa	Ligat Ha'Al
9 March 2013	Weaam Amasha	Yes	Maccabi Netanya	Ligat Ha'Al
13 March 2013	Weaam Amasha	Yes	Beitar Jerusalem F.C.	State Cup
17 April 2013	Dino Ndlovu	Yes	Ironi Kiryat Shmona	State Cup
