= 2012–13 Israeli Premier League =

Israeli Premier League
- Season: 2012–13
- Dates: 25 August 2012 – 20 May 2013
- Champions: Maccabi Tel Aviv; 2nd Premier League title 19th Israeli title overall
- Relegated: Maccabi Netanya; Hapoel Ramat Gan
- Champions League: Maccabi Tel Aviv (Second qualifying round)
- Europa League: Hapoel Ramat Gan (Third qualifying round); Maccabi Haifa (Second qualifying round); Hapoel Tel Aviv (Second qualifying round)
- Matches: 240
- Goals: 608 (2.53 per match)
- Top goalscorer: Eliran Atar (22 goals)
- Biggest home win: Maccabi Haifa 6–0 Ironi Ramat HaSharon
- Biggest away win: Bnei Sakhnin 0–4 Ironi Ramat HaSharon
- Highest scoring: Maccabi Tel Aviv 6–2 Hapoel Haifa; Hapoel Acre 4–4 Maccabi Netanya; Maccabi Netanya 3–5 Bnei Yehuda
- Longest winning run: 8 games Maccabi Tel Aviv
- Longest unbeaten run: 16 games Maccabi Tel Aviv
- Longest winless run: 16 games Hapoel Acre
- Longest losing run: 6 games Hapoel Acre
- Highest attendance: 33,000 – Ironi Ramat HaSharon 0–2 Maccabi Tel Aviv (22 April 2013)
- Lowest attendance: 150; Ironi Ramat HaSharon 3–1 Hapoel Acre
- Average attendance: 4,916

The 2012–13 Israeli Premier League was the fourteenth season since its introduction in 1999 and the 71st season of top-tier football in Israel. It began on 25 August 2012 and ended on 20 May 2013. Ironi Kiryat Shmona were the defending champions, having won their first Premier League title last season.

Maccabi Tel Aviv secured the title with a 2–0 win against Ironi Ramat HaSharon on 22 April 2012. This was their 19th Israeli league title, this win gave Maccabi Tel Aviv a 13-point advantage over the second-place team Maccabi Haifa with four more rounds to go.

== Structural changes ==
There were three structural changes:

- Only fourteen teams competed in this season, reducing from sixteen teams.
- The top playoff were contested by six teams which were played against each other twice, and the bottom playoff was contested by eight teams which were played against each other once.
- There were two relegated teams, and two promoted team from Liga Leumit.

== Teams ==
Locations of the 2012–13 Israeli Premier League teams

A total of fourteen teams competed in the league, including thirteen sides from the 2011–12 season and one promoted team from the 2011–12 Liga Leumit.

Hapoel Petah Tikva, Hapoel Rishon LeZion, and Maccabi Petah Tikva were relegated to the 2012–13 Liga Leumit after finishing the 2011–12 season in the bottom three places. Maccabi Petah Tikva were relegated after 21 straight seasons, Hapoel Petah Tikva after four years consecutively and Hapoel Rishon LeZion after just one year on the top division.

Hapoel Ramat Gan were promoted to the 2012–13 Israeli Premier League after beating Hapoel Bnei Lod in the 2011–12 Liga Leumit promotion playoff. They last played in the top division in the 2010–11 Season.

=== Stadia and locations ===
Club	Home City	Stadium	Capacity
Beitar Jerusalem	Jerusalem	Teddy Stadium	21,600
Bnei Sakhnin	Sakhnin	Doha Stadium	8,500
Bnei Yehuda	Tel Aviv	Bloomfield Stadium	14,413
F.C. Ashdod	Ashdod	Yud-Alef Stadium	7,800
Hapoel Acre	Acre	Acre Municipal Stadium	5,000
Hapoel Be'er Sheva	Be'er Sheva	Vasermil Stadium	13,000
Hapoel Haifa	Haifa	Kiryat Eliezer Stadium	14,002
Hapoel Ramat Gan	Ramat Gan	Ramat Gan Stadium^{[A]}	41,583
Hapoel Tel Aviv	Tel Aviv	Bloomfield Stadium	14,413
Ironi Kiryat Shmona	Kiryat Shmona	Kiryat Shmona Stadium	5,300
Ironi Ramat HaSharon	Ramat HaSharon	Grundman Stadium	4,300
Maccabi Haifa	Haifa	Kiryat Eliezer Stadium	14,002
Maccabi Netanya	Netanya	Netanya Stadium^{[B]}	13,610
Maccabi Tel Aviv	Tel Aviv	Bloomfield Stadium	14,413

A: The club plays its home games at a neutral venue because their own ground does not meet Premier League requirements.
B: While Netanya Stadium was under construction. Maccabi Netanya hosted their home games in Ramat Gan Stadium until 6 October 2012.

Beitar Jerusalem	Bnei Yehuda Hapoel Tel Aviv Maccabi Tel Aviv	Ironi Kiryat Shmona	Hapoel Acre
Teddy Stadium	Bloomfield Stadium	Kiryat Shmona Stadium	Acre Stadium
Maccabi Netanya	Hapoel Haifa Maccabi Haifa	Hapoel Petah Tikva Maccabi Petah Tikva	Hapoel Ramat HaSharon
Netanya Stadium	Kiryat Eliezer Stadium	HaMoshava Stadium	Grundman Stadium
F.C. Ashdod	Bnei Sakhnin	Hapoel Be'er Sheva	
Yud-Alef Stadium	Doha Stadium	Vasermil Stadium	

=== Personnel and sponsorship ===
Team	President	Manager	Captain	Kitmaker	Shirt sponsor
Beitar Jerusalem	(Russia) Arcadi Gaydamak	(Israel) Eli Cohen (b. 1951)	(Israel) Amit Ben Shushan	Diadora	Eldan
Bnei Sakhnin	(Israel) Shaher Khalaila	(Israel) Marco Balbul	(Israel) Khaled Khalaila	Lotto	Bank Leumi
Bnei Yehuda	(Israel) Moshe Damaio	(Israel) Dror Kashtan	(Israel) Kfir Edri	Puma	Strauss
F.C. Ashdod	(Israel) Jacky Ben-Zaken	(Israel) Yossi Mizrahi	(Israel) David Revivo	Nike	Sektor Town
Hapoel Acre	(Israel) Tzion Weitzman	(Israel) Yuval Naim	(Israel) David Goresh	Nike	Shahaf Security
Hapoel Be'er Sheva	(Israel) Alona Barkat	(Israel) Elisha Levy	(Israel) Aviatar Iluz	Kappa	Mobli, Dell
Hapoel Haifa	(Israel) Yoav Katz	(Israel) Nir Klinger	(Israel) Eyal Tartazky	Diadora	Hatama Security
Hapoel Ramat Gan	(Israel) Nir Arkin	(Israel) Eli Cohen (b. 1961)	(Israel) Tamir Ben Ami	Puma	Avi Sofer
Hapoel Tel Aviv	(Israel) Haim Ramon	(Israel) Freddy David	(Israel) Walid Badir	Kappa	Bonnie Hatichon, Shlomo Sixt
Ironi Kiryat Shmona	(Israel) Izzy Sheratzky	(Israel) Barak Bakhar	(Israel) Adrian Rochet	Lotto	Ituran
Ironi Ramat HaSharon	(Israel) Boaz Moldavsky	(Israel) Benny Tabak	(Israel) Gal Nir	Lotto	—
Maccabi Haifa	(Israel) Ya'akov Shahar	(Israel) Arik Benado	(Israel) Yaniv Katan	Nike	Honda, Herbalife
Maccabi Netanya	(Israel) Kobi Baladev	(Israel) Reuven Atar	(Israel) Achmad Saba'a	Diadora	Burgus Burger Bar
Maccabi Tel Aviv	(Canada) Mitchell Goldhar	(Spain) Óscar García	(Israel) Sheran Yeini	Under Armour	Nivea

=== Managerial changes ===
Team	Outgoing manager	Manner of departure	Date of vacancy	Position in table	Incoming manager	Date of appointment	Final position
Hapoel Acre	(Israel) Eli Cohen (b. 1961)	End of contract	13 May 2012	10th (11–12)	(Israel) Shimon Edri	28 May 2012	14th
Hapoel Haifa	(Israel) Tal Banin	End of contract	13 May 2012	12th (11–12)	(Israel) Nir Klinger	23 May 2012	9th
Maccabi Netanya	(Israel) Reuven Atar	End of contract	13 May 2012	4th (11–12)	(Israel) Tal Banin	13 May 2012	12th
Bnei Yehuda	(Israel) Yossi Abukasis	End of contract	13 May 2012	3rd (11–12)	(Israel) Dror Kashtan	13 May 2012	5th
Hapoel Ironi Kiryat Shmona	(Israel) Ran Ben Shimon	End of contract	13 May 2012	1st (11–12)	(Israel) Gili Landau	13 May 2012	7th
Maccabi Tel Aviv	(Israel) Nir Levine	End of contract	13 May 2012	6th (11–12)	(Spain) Óscar García	22 May 2012	1st
Ironi Ramat HaSharon	(Israel) Yehoshua Feigenbaum	End of contract	13 May 2012	11th (11–12)	(Israel) Nissan Yehezkel	14 May 2012	6th
Hapoel Be'er Sheva	(Israel) Guy Levy	End of contract	13 May 2012	13th (11–12)	(Israel) Elisha Levy	16 May 2012	10th
Maccabi Haifa	(Israel) Elisha Levy	End of contract	16 May 2012	5th (11–12)	(Israel) Reuven Atar	16 May 2012	13th
Ironi Ramat HaSharon	(Israel) Nissan Yehezkel	Sacked	2 September 2012	6th	(Israel) Beni Tabak (joint manager) (Israel) Meni Koretski (joint manager)	4 September 2012	5th
Hapoel Tel Aviv	(Israel) Nitzan Shirazi	Stepped down for health reasons	27 September 2012	3rd	(Israel) Yossi Abukasis	27 September 2012	3rd
Hapoel Ironi Kiryat Shmona	(Israel) Gili Landau	Sacked	3 October 2012	7th	(Israel) Barak Bakhar (caretaker)	3 October 2012	4th
Maccabi Haifa	(Israel) Reuven Atar	Sacked	13 November 2012	13th	(Israel) Arik Benado^{[C]}	17 November 2012	2nd
Hapoel Ramat Gan	(Israel) Freddy David	Sacked	28 November 2012	13th	(Israel) Eli Cohen (b. 1961)	28 November 2012	12th
Ironi Ramat HaSharon	(Israel) Meni Koretski (joint manager)	Resigned	12 January 2013	5th	(Israel) Benny Tabak (sole manager)	12 January 2013	6th
Hapoel Acre	(Israel) Shimon Edri	Sacked	31 January 2013	14th	(Israel) Yuval Naim	31 January 2013	11th
Hapoel Tel Aviv	(Israel) Yossi Abukasis	Sacked	16 February 2013	3rd	(Israel) Freddy David	18 February 2013	3rd
Bnei Sakhnin	(Israel) Shlomi Dora	Sacked	10 March 2013	12th	(Israel) Marco Balbul	11 March 2013	13th
Maccabi Netanya	(Israel) Tal Banin	Sacked	18 March 2013	12th	(Israel) Reuven Atar	19 March 2013	14th

^C Arik Benado was acted as caretaker manager for eight days until his appointment as manager on 25 November 2012.

=== Foreign players ===
Club	Player 1	Player 2	Player 3	Player 4	Player 5	Non-visa Foreign	Former Players
Beitar Jerusalem	(Argentina) Darío Fernández	(Croatia) Dino Škvorc	(Croatia) Dominik Glavina	(Russia) **Dzhabrail Kadiyev**	(Russia) **Zaur Sadayev**	(France) Steven Cohen^{2}	
Bnei Sakhnin	(Democratic Republic of the Congo) Pieter Mbemba	(Ghana) **Imoro Lukman**	(Nigeria) Yero Bello	(Serbia) Aleksandar Davidov	(Togo) **Arafat Djako**		(France) Maxime Josse (Ivory Coast) Joël Damahou
Bnei Yehuda	(Argentina) Pedro Galván	(Hungary) Ádám Hrepka	(Lithuania) Kęstutis Ivaškevičius	(Nigeria) Dele Aiyenugba	(Serbia) Nenad Marinković		
F.C. Ashdod	(Bulgaria) Dimitar Makriev	(Democratic Republic of the Congo) Paty Yeye Lenkebe	(Nigeria) Juwon Oshaniwa	(Serbia) **Stefan Šćepović**	(Slovenia) Sandi Arčon		(Ghana) William Owusu (Nigeria) Efe Ambrose
Hapoel Acre	(Nigeria) Dimaku Fidelis	(Serbia) **Branislav Jovanović**	(Serbia) Nebojša Marinković	(Serbia) **Nemanja Arsenijević**	(Serbia) **Srđa Knežević**		(Brazil) Leo (Ghana) Imoro Lukman
Hapoel Be'er Sheva	(Bosnia and Herzegovina) Bojan Marković	(Brazil) William Soares	(Kenya) Patrick Osiako	(Nigeria) Austin Ejide	(Zambia) William Njobvu		(United States) Ryan Adeleye^{2}
Hapoel Haifa	(Montenegro) Stefan Denković	(Montenegro) Vladimir Gluščević	(Serbia) Dušan Brković	(Serbia) Danilo Nikolić	(Suriname) **Touvarno Pinas**	(Croatia) Tvrtko Kale^{2}	(Switzerland) Fabian Stoller
Hapoel Ramat Gan	(Central African Republic) David Manga	(Mali) Djibril Sidibé	(Republic of the Congo) Bernard Itoua	(Romania) **Dorin Goga**	(Slovenia) **Miran Burgić**	(Argentina) Carlos Chacana^{2}	(Bosnia and Herzegovina) Miroslav Pejić (Russia) Anton Arkhipov
Hapoel Tel Aviv	(Armenia) Apoula Edel	(Cameroon) Eric Djemba-Djemba	(Montenegro) **Savo Pavićević**	(Portugal) **Tiago Costa**	(Spain) **David Rochela**		(Brazil) Bruno Coutinho (Ghana) John Paintsil (Serbia) Nikola Petković
Ironi Kiryat Shmona	(Argentina) David Solari	(Ghana) **Osei Mawuli**	(North Macedonia) Darko Tasevski	(Serbia) Dušan Matović		(United States) Bryan Gerzicich^{1}	(Finland) Roni Porokara (Hungary) László Lencse
Ironi Ramat HaSharon	(Argentina) Adrián Fernández	(Democratic Republic of the Congo) Savity Lipenia	(Nigeria) **Udo Fortune**	(Serbia) **Marko Anđelković**	(Spain) **Hugo López**		(Brazil) Cadu (Bulgaria) Yordan Miliev (North Macedonia) Hristijan Kirovski
Maccabi Haifa	(Bosnia and Herzegovina) Edin Cocalić	(Serbia) Bojan Šaranov	(South Africa) Dino Ndlovu	(Ukraine) Andriy Pylyavskyi		(Canada) **Daniel Haber**^{2}	(Ivory Coast) Joël Damahou

In bold: Players that join the club mid-season

In Italic: Players that left the club mid-season

The following do not fill a Visa position:
^{1}Players who were born and started their professional career abroad but have since gained an Israeli passport or permanent residency, allowing them to play with Israeli status;
^{2}Players who were born and started their professional career abroad but are eligible for Israeli citizenship due to Jewish ancestry;

^{3}Israeli citizens who have chosen to represent another national team;

== Regular season ==
=== Table ===
Pos	Team	Pld	W	D	L	GF	GA	GD	Pts	Qualification
1	Maccabi Tel Aviv	26	19	2	5	61	20	+41	59	Qualification for the championship round
2	Maccabi Haifa	26	14	7	5	41	20	+21	49	Qualification for the championship round
3	Ironi Kiryat Shmona	26	11	10	5	34	25	+9	43	Qualification for the championship round
4	Hapoel Tel Aviv	26	12	6	8	33	29	+4	42	Qualification for the championship round
5	Bnei Yehuda	26	11	5	10	35	31	+4	38	Qualification for the championship round
6	Ironi Nir Ramat HaSharon	26	11	4	11	28	30	−2	37	Qualification for the championship round
7	F.C. Ashdod	26	10	5	11	30	30	0	35	Qualification for the relegation round
8	Beitar Jerusalem	26	8	9	9	36	42	−6	33	Qualification for the relegation round
9	Hapoel Be'er Sheva	26	7	9	10	23	35	−12	30	Qualification for the relegation round
10	Hapoel Haifa	26	6	10	10	28	40	−12	28	Qualification for the relegation round
11	Maccabi Netanya	26	6	9	11	32	39	−7	27	Qualification for the relegation round
12	Bnei Sakhnin	26	6	8	12	25	45	−20	26	Qualification for the relegation round
13	Hapoel Ramat Gan	26	6	7	13	32	39	−7	25	Qualification for the relegation round
14	Hapoel Acre	26	5	9	12	29	42	−13	24	Qualification for the relegation round

Source: Israel Football Association
Rules for classification: 1st points; 2nd goal difference; 3rd matches won; 4th goals scored; 5th head-to-head; 6th decision match

=== Results ===
Home \ Away	BEI	BnY	BnS	ASH	HAC	HBS	HHA	HRG	HTA	IKS	IRH	MHA	MNE	MTA
Beitar Jerusalem	—	0–1	2–2	1–1	0–1	1–1	3–0	3–2	3–2	2–2	1–0	1–2	1–1	1–1
Bnei Yehuda	1–2	—	0–0	2–0	2–1	1–0	3–1	1–0	2–1	0–2	2–2	2–0	3–0	2–3
Bnei Sakhnin	1–1	2–2	—	1–3	2–1	3–2	2–0	1–3	0–3	1–3	0–4	0–1	0–0	0–3
F.C. Ironi Ashdod	2–1	2–1	1–2	—	2–0	0–1	1–1	2–3	1–2	2–0	2–0	1–4	3–0	1–0
Hapoel Acre	2–3	1–1	5–1	3–1	—	2–2	1–3	0–3	0–0	1–1	0–2	0–0	4–4	0–2
Hapoel Be'er Sheva	0–0	1–0	0–0	0–0	0–0	—	2–1	3–2	1–2	1–0	0–1	1–1	1–3	3–1
Hapoel Haifa	3–0	2–1	1–3	2–1	0–0	0–0	—	2–1	2–2	1–1	3–0	0–3	0–0	1–3
Hapoel Ramat Gan	2–2	1–0	2–1	0–1	1–2	3–0	1–1	—	0–1	1–1	1–1	0–3	1–1	0–1
Hapoel Tel Aviv	0–2	2–0	1–0	1–1	0–0	4–1	2–0	2–2	—	1–1	1–0	3–0	0–3	1–0
Ironi Kiryat Shmona	3–2	2–0	2–0	0–0	1–0	1–1	1–1	3–1	0–1	—	2–0	0–0	0–1	0–0
Ironi Nir Ramat HaSharon	1–0	2–1	1–3	1–0	3–1	0–1	2–0	1–0	1–0	0–1	—	1–1	0–0	3–4
Maccabi Haifa	4–1	1–1	0–0	0–1	3–1	2–0	1–1	2–0	3–0	1–3	4–0	—	1–0	1–0
Maccabi Netanya	2–3	3–5	0–0	2–0	3–1	2–1	0–0	1–1	2–1	3–4	1–2	1–2	—	0–1
Maccabi Tel Aviv	5–0	0–1	4–0	2–1	4–0	5–0	6–2	3–1	4–0	4–0	1–0	2–1	2–1	—

Source: Israel Football Association
Legend: Blue = home team win; Yellow = draw; Red = away team win.

== Playoffs ==
Key numbers for pairing determination (number marks position after 26 games):

Rounds
27th	28th	29th	30th	31st	32nd	33rd	34th	35th	36th
1–6; 2–5; 3–4	1–2; 5–3; 6–4	2–6; 3–1; 4–5	1–4; 2–3; 6–5	3–6; 4–2; 5–1	6–1; 5–2; 4–3	2–1; 3–5; 4–6	6–2; 1–3; 5–4	3–2; 4–1; 5–6	6–3; 2–4; 1–5
7–14; 8–13; 9–12; 10–11	7–8; 13–9; 12–10; 14–11	8–14; 9–7; 10–13; 11–12	8–9; 7–10; 13–11; 14–12	9–14; 10–8; 11–7; 12–13	9–10; 8–11; 7–12; 14–13	10–14; 11–9; 12–8; 13–7			

=== Top Playoff ===
==== Table ====
Pos	Team	Pld	W	D	L	GF	GA	GD	Pts	Qualification
1	Maccabi Tel Aviv (C)	36	25	5	6	78	30	+48	80	Qualification for the Champions League second qualifying round
2	Maccabi Haifa	36	19	10	7	62	33	+29	67	Qualification for the Europa League second qualifying round
3	Hapoel Tel Aviv	36	17	7	12	47	45	+2	58	Qualification for the Europa League second qualifying round
4	Bnei Yehuda	36	16	7	13	50	40	+10	55	
5	Ironi Kiryat Shmona	36	14	11	11	45	38	+7	53	
6	Ironi Nir Ramat HaSharon	36	12	4	20	31	50	−19	40	

Source: Israel Football Association
Rules for classification: 1st points; 2nd goal difference; 3rd matches won; 4th goals scored; 5th head-to-head; 6th decision match
(C) Champions

==== Results ====
Home \ Away	BnY	HTA	IKS	IRH	MHA	MTA
Bnei Yehuda	—	0–1	1–1	2–1	2–1	2–2
Hapoel Tel Aviv	2–1	—	1–4	2–0	2–2	2–4
Ironi Kiryat Shmona	0–1	0–1	—	1–0	1–2	1–3
Ironi Nir Ramat HaSharon	0–3	0–1	0–1	—	2–1	0–2
Maccabi Haifa	1–0	3–2	3–2	6–0	—	2–2
Maccabi Tel Aviv	0–3	2–0	1–0	1–0	0–0	—

Source: Israel Football Association
Legend: Blue = home team win; Yellow = draw; Red = away team win.

=== Bottom Playoff ===
==== Table ====
Pos	Team	Pld	W	D	L	GF	GA	GD	Pts	Qualification or relegation
7	F.C. Ashdod	33	12	7	14	38	40	−2	43	
8	Hapoel Be'er Sheva	33	10	11	12	32	39	−7	41	
9	Hapoel Haifa	33	9	12	12	36	45	−9	39	
10	Beitar Jerusalem	33	9	12	12	44	54	−10	39	
11	Hapoel Acre	33	8	13	12	39	48	−9	37	
12	Bnei Sakhnin	33	8	13	12	31	49	−18	37	
13	Maccabi Netanya (R)	33	8	11	14	38	50	−12	35	Relegation to Liga Leumit
14	Hapoel Ramat Gan (R)	33	7	9	17	39	48	−9	30	Europa League qualifying and relegation to Liga Leumit (Note: Hapoel Ramat Gan qualified for the Europa League third qualifying of the 2013–14 UEFA Europa League after winning the 2012–13 Israel State Cup.)

Source: Israel Football Association
Rules for classification: 1st points; 2nd goal difference; 3rd matches won; 4th goals scored; 5th head-to-head; 6th decision match
(R) Relegated

==== Results ====
Home \ Away	BEI	BnS	ASH	HAC	HBS	HHA	HRG	MNE
Beitar Jerusalem	—	—	—	2–2	1–0	—	1–2	1–3
Bnei Sakhnin	0–0	—	—	—	—	0–0	1–0	—
F.C. Ironi Ashdod	2–2	1–1	—	1–2	—	1–0	—	—
Hapoel Acre	—	1–1	—	—	—	—	2–1	2–0
Hapoel Be'er Sheva	—	1–2	2–0	0–0	—	2–0	—	—
Hapoel Haifa	3–1	—	—	1–1	—	—	1–0	3–0
Hapoel Ramat Gan	—	—	1–2	—	1–1	—	—	0–0
Maccabi Netanya	—	1–1	2–1	—	0–3	—	—	—

Source: Israel Football Association
Legend: Blue = home team win; Yellow = draw; Red = away team win.

== Season statistics ==
=== Top scorers ===
Rank	Scorer	Club	Goals
1	(Israel) Eliran Atar	Maccabi Tel Aviv	22
2	(Israel) Shimon Abuhatzira	Ironi Kiryat Shmona	15
3	(Israel) Ohad Kadousi	Hapoel Acre	14
4	(Israel) Omer Damari	Hapoel Tel Aviv	13
5	(Israel) Weaam Amasha	Maccabi Haifa	11
5	(Israel) Avi Reikan	Beitar Jerusalem	11
5	(Argentina) Pedro Galván	Bnei Yehuda	11
8	(Central African Republic) David Manga	Hapoel Ramat Gan	10
8	(Israel) Toto Tamuz	Hapoel Tel Aviv	10
8	(Israel) Dovev Gabay	Hapoel Be'er Sheva	10
8	(Israel) Mu'nas Dabbur	Maccabi Tel Aviv	10
8	(Israel) Achmad Saba'a	Maccabi Netanya	10
Total			680
Average per game			2.53

Source: Israel Football Association

=== Hat-tricks ===
Player	For	Against	Result	Date
(Israel) Eliran Atar	Maccabi Tel Aviv	Hapoel Haifa	3–1	15 September 2012
(Israel) Ohad Kadousi	Hapoel Acre	Bnei Sakhnin	5–1	15 September 2012
(Israel) Toto Tamuz	Hapoel Tel Aviv	Hapoel Be'er Sheva	4–1	26 November 2012
(Central African Republic) David Manga	Hapoel Ramat Gan	Hapoel Acre	3–0	1 December 2012
(Argentina) Pedro Galván	Bnei Yehuda	Maccabi Netanya	5–3	9 February 2013
(South Africa) Dino Ndlovu^{4}	Maccabi Haifa	Ironi Ramat HaSharon	6–0	2 April 2013
(Israel) Shimon Abuhatzira^{4}	Ironi Kiryat Shmona	Hapoel Tel Aviv	4–1	20 April 2013

- ^{4} Player scored 4 goals

=== Scoring ===
- First goal of the season: (Israel) Murad Abu Anza for F.C. Ashdod against Ironi Ramat HaSharon, 8th minute (25 August 2012)
- Widest winning margin: 6 goals – Maccabi Haifa 6–0 Ironi Ramat HaSharon (2 April 2013)
- Most goals scored by a losing team: 3 goals
  - Ironi Ramat HaSharon 3–4 Maccabi Tel Aviv (24 November 2012)
  - Maccabi Netanya 3–4 Ironi Kiryat Shmona (29 December 2012)
  - Maccabi Netanya 3–5 Bnei Yehuda (9 February 2013)
- Most goals in a match by one player: 4 goals
  - (South Africa) Dino Ndlovu for Maccabi Haifa against Ironi Ramat HaSharon (2 April 2013)
  - (Israel) Shimon Abuhatzira for Ironi Kiryat Shmona against Hapoel Tel Aviv (20 April 2013)

=== Discipline ===
- First yellow card of the season: (Bosnia and Herzegovina) Bojan Marković for Hapoel Be'er Sheva against Bnei Sakhnin, 9th minute (25 August 2012)
- Most yellow cards by a player: 13 – (Israel) Kobi Moyal (Beitar Jerusalem)
- First red card of the season: (Israel) Dia Saba for Hapoel Be'er Sheva against Bnei Sakhnin, 89th minute (25 August 2012)
- Most red cards by a player: 2 –
  - (Israel) Mohammed Zbidat (Bnei Sakhnin)
  - (Israel) Elad Gabai (Ironi Kiryat Shmona)

=== Clean sheets ===
- Most clean sheets: 17
  - Maccabi Tel Aviv
- Fewest clean sheets: 4
  - Hapoel Ramat Gan

== Attendances ==
Rank	Club	Average	Highest
1	Maccabi Tel Aviv	11,195	14,000
2	Maccabi Haifa	10,626	14,363
3	Hapoel Tel Aviv	8,767	16,217
4	Beitar Jerusalem	7,917	28,000
5	Maccabi Netanya	5,146	14,000
6	Hapoel Haifa	4,601	10,228
7	Hapoel Be'er-Sheva	4,534	9,000
8	Bnei Yehuda Tel Aviv	4,314	14,000
9	Bnei Sakhnin	3,106	8,500
10	Hapoel Ironi Acre	2,399	8,000
11	Hapoel Ironi Kiryat Shmona	2,233	4,500
12	Ashdod	2,040	6,800
13	Hapoel Ramat Gan	1,848	4,800
14	Ironi Nir Ramat HaSharon	1,202	3,500

== See also ==
- 2012–13 Israel State Cup
- 2012–13 Toto Cup Al
