= 2012–13 Toto Cup Al =

Tournament details
- Country: Israel
- Teams: 14

Final positions
- Champions: Hapoel Haifa (2nd title)
- Runners-up: Hapoel Be'er Sheva

Tournament statistics
- Matches played: 37
- Goals scored: 99 (2.68 per match)
- Top goal scorer: (Israel) Tomer Swisa (6)

The 2012–13 Toto Cup Al was the 29th season of the third important football tournament in Israel since its introduction and the 9th tournament involving Israeli Premier League clubs only.

It was held in two stages. First, fourteen Premier League teams were divided into three groups, five teams in groups A and C and four teams in group B. The teams played against each other once. The best 3 teams from groups A and C and the best 2 teams from group B were advanced to the quarter-finals. The quarter finals were two-legged ties. The Semifinals and the Final were one-legged matches, that were held in a neutral stadium.

The tournament began on 4 August 2012 and ended on 23 January 2013. Ironi Kiryat Shmona were the defending champions, who made it their second Toto Cup Al title overall.

On 23 January 2013, Hapoel Haifa won the cup after beating Hapoel Be'er Sheva in the finals.

== Group stage ==
The draw took place on 2 July 2012.

The matches were played from 4 August to 3 October 2012.

=== Group A ===
Pos	Team	Pld	W	D	L	GF	GA	GD	Pts	MHA	IKS	HHA	BnS	HAC
1	Maccabi Haifa (A)	4	2	2	0	9	1	+8	8			0–0	6–0	
2	Ironi Kiryat Shmona (A)	4	2	1	1	4	3	+1	7	0–2		1–1		
3	Hapoel Haifa (A)	4	1	3	0	5	4	+1	6				3–2	1–1
4	Bnei Sakhnin	4	1	0	3	5	10	−5	3		0–2			3–0
5	Hapoel Acre	4	0	2	2	2	6	−4	2	1–1	0–1			

Source: football.org.il (in Hebrew)
Rules for classification: 1st points; 2nd goal difference; 3rd matches won; 4th goals scored; 5th head-to-head; 6th decision match
(A) Advanced to the quarterfinals

=== Group B ===
Pos	Team	Pld	W	D	L	GF	GA	GD	Pts	MTA	MNE	HTA	BnY
1	Maccabi Tel Aviv (A)	3	2	1	0	6	2	+4	7		3–0		
2	Maccabi Netanya (A)	3	1	1	1	3	5	−2	4			2–1	1–1
3	Hapoel Tel Aviv	3	1	0	2	3	3	0	3	0–1			2–0
4	Bnei Yehuda	3	0	2	1	3	5	−2	2	2–2			

Source: football.org.il (in Hebrew)
Rules for classification: 1st points; 2nd goal difference; 3rd matches won; 4th goals scored; 5th head-to-head; 6th decision match
(A) Advanced to the quarterfinals

=== Group C ===
Pos	Team	Pld	W	D	L	GF	GA	GD	Pts	HBS	HRG	IRH	BEI	ASH
1	Hapoel Be'er Sheva (A)	4	2	2	0	7	3	+4	8		2–2	1–1		
2	Hapoel Ramat Gan (A)	4	2	1	1	9	5	+4	7			1–0	2–3	
3	Ironi Nir Ramat HaSharon (A)	4	1	2	1	5	5	0	5				2–2	2–1
4	Beitar Jerusalem	4	1	2	1	5	6	−1	5	0–2				0–0
5	F.C. Ironi Ashdod	4	0	1	3	1	8	−7	1	0–2	0–4			

Source: football.org.il (in Hebrew)
Rules for classification: 1st points; 2nd goal difference; 3rd matches won; 4th goals scored; 5th head-to-head; 6th decision match
(A) Advanced to the quarterfinals

== Elimination rounds ==
=== Quarterfinals ===
The draw for the quarterfinals was held on 9 October 2012. The first legs was played on 27 and 28 November, and the second legs were played on 11 and 12 December 2012.

Ironi Kiryat Shmona first tie was played on 12 December due to their involvement in the UEFA Europa League, with their second leg played on 18 December 2012.

Team 1	Agg.	Team 2	1st leg	2nd leg
Hapoel Haifa	3−2	Maccabi Tel Aviv	2−2	1−0
Maccabi Netanya	4−3	Maccabi Haifa	3−2	1−1
Ironi Kiryat Shmona	3−5	Hapoel Be'er Sheva	2−3	1−2
Ironi Ramat HaSharon	1−3	Hapoel Ramat Gan	0−2	1−1

=== Semifinals ===
The draw took place on 16 December 2012.

The matches were played on 26 December 2012.

Team 1	Score	Team 2
Hapoel Haifa	1–0	Maccabi Netanya
Hapoel Ramat Gan	3–3 (1–4 p)	Hapoel Be'er Sheva

=== Final ===
23 January 2013
19:45 IST

Hapoel Be'er Sheva	0 – 1 (a.e.t.)	Hapoel Haifa
	Report	93' Pinas

HaMoshava Stadium, Petah Tikva
Attendance: 4,600
Referee: Shay Shitrit

== See also ==
- 2012–13 Toto Cup Leumit
- 2012–13 Israeli Premier League
- 2012–13 Israel State Cup
