= Ahad Azam =

Israeli-Druze footballer

Ahad Azam عاهد عزام
Personal information
- Full name: Ahad Azam
- Date of birth: January 14, 1992 (age 34)
- Place of birth: Shfaram, Israel
- Height: 1.82 m (6 ft 0 in)
- Position: Defensive midfielder

Team information
- Current team: Maccabi Isfiya

Youth career
- Hapoel Haifa

Senior career*
Years	Team	Apps	(Gls)
2011–2014	Hapoel Haifa	64	(2)
2014–2015	Ironi Kiryat Shmona	28	(1)
2015–2017	Hapoel Haifa	0	(0)
2017	Hapoel Bnei Lod	14	(0)
2017–2018	F.C. Haifa Robi Shapira	25	(2)
2018–2019	Maccabi Ironi Kiryat Ata	19	(0)
2019–2020	Maccabi Ahi Nazareth	24	(1)
2020–2021	Ihud Bnei Shefa-'Amr	4	(0)
2021	Maccabi Ironi Tirat HaCarmel	16	(1)
2021–2022	Maccabi Tamra	16	(0)
2022	Bnei Eilat	7	(0)
2022–2023	F.C. Shfaram	28	(7)
2023–2025	Ironi Nesher	29	(2)
2024–2025	→ Shfaram (loan)	17	(2)
2025–	Maccabi Isfiya	7	(2)

International career
2007	Israel U16	9	(1)
2008	Israel U17	15	(0)
2009	Israel U18	5	(0)
2010	Israel U19	14	(1)
2011–2014	Israel U21	20	(0)
- * Club domestic league appearances and goals as of 11 April 2025

Ahad Azam (Arabic: عاهد عزام, Hebrew: עאהד עזאם; born 14 January 1992) is a Druze-Israeli association footballer currently playing for Maccabi Isfiya.

== Career ==
=== Club ===
Azam grew up in the Hapoel Haifa youth academy. He made his debut with the senior team on 4 December 2011.

On 9 September 2014 moved to Hapoel Ironi Kiryar Shmona. After one season backed to Hapoel Haifa.

== Statistics ==
Club performance			League		Cup		League Cup		Continental		Total	
Season	Club	League	Apps	Goals	Apps	Goals	Apps	Goals	Apps	Goals	Apps	Goals
Israel			League		Israel State Cup		Toto Cup		Europe		Total	
2011–12	Hapoel Haifa	Ligat Ha'Al	8	0	0	0	0	0	0	0	8	0
2012–13	Hapoel Haifa	Ligat Ha'Al	30	0	2	0	7	0	0	0	39	0
2013–14	Hapoel Haifa	Ligat Ha'Al	26	2	2	0	0	0	0	0	28	2
2014–15	Hapoel Haifa	Ligat Ha'Al	0	0	0	0	2	0	0	0	2	0
2014–15	Ironi Kiryat Shmona	Ligat Ha'Al	28	1	4	0	0	0	0	0	32	1
Career total			92	3	8	0	9	0	0	0	109	3

== See also ==
- List of Israeli Druze
