= Tamir Cohen =

Israeli footballer

Tamir Cohen תמיר כהן
Personal information
- Full name: Tamir Cohen
- Date of birth: 4 March 1984 (age 42)
- Place of birth: Tel Aviv, Israel
- Height: 1.81 m (5 ft 11 in)
- Position: Midfielder

Youth career
- Maccabi Tel Aviv

Senior career*
Years	Team	Apps	(Gls)
2002–2007	Maccabi Tel Aviv	81	(4)
2007–2008	Maccabi Netanya	27	(2)
2008–2011	Bolton Wanderers	49	(6)
2011–2013	Maccabi Haifa	17	(0)
2013–2014	Hapoel Ra'anana	21	(4)
Total		195	(16)

International career
2001–2002	Israel U19	14	
2003–2006	Israel U21	12	(3)
2007–2011	Israel	21	(1)
- * Club domestic league appearances and goals

Tamir Cohen (Hebrew: תמיר כהן; born 4 March 1984) is an Israeli former professional footballer who played as a midfielder. He is the son of the late Maccabi Tel Aviv and Liverpool player Avi Cohen.

== Club career ==
=== Early career ===
Cohen was born in Tel Aviv, Israel, and is Jewish.

He started his career in Maccabi Tel Aviv's youth team where in 2001–02 he won the double. His first game in the Israeli Premier League was in November 2002 during Maccabi's 1–0 win over Bnei Yehuda Tel Aviv, when he came on as a substitute. He scored his first goal against Maccabi Petah Tikva in a 2–1 in the Toto Cup, where he scored the winning goal.

On 11 January 2007 Cohen moved to Maccabi Netanya.

=== Bolton Wanderers ===
On 1 January 2008, Cohen transferred to English club Bolton Wanderers for a fee of £39,000. He made his Bolton debut in the 1–0 FA Cup defeat to Sheffield United, wearing the squad number 25, previously occupied by Abdoulaye Faye. His first Premiership goal was scored on 2 March 2008 in a match against his father's former club Liverpool at the Reebok stadium, which ended in a 3–1 win for Liverpool. The 25-year-old made 11 appearances in his first season in English football.

In the 2008–09 campaign, Cohen played a peripheral role for Bolton Wanderers this campaign with a longstanding thigh injury keeping him out of action for over five months. The Israeli man eventually returned to the first team fold in the final couple of months of the season, earning his first start against Aston Villa at the Reebok Stadium on 25 April. Cohen stole all the headlines with a vibrant midfield performance and capped off the afternoon with a neatly taken equaliser to earn Bolton a vital point. He celebrated his goal by saluting his friends and family who were sat in the West Stand after he had been handed a 'lucky shekel' to put down his sock. Cohen expressed hope that his injury problems would be behind him and that Wanderers fans would see more of his footballing talents in the 2009–10, saying "It's been very frustrating because it's not easy for a football player to be injured. But that is football and you need to live with that. Now hopefully I won't be out anymore while I'm with Bolton".

Cohen was released by Bolton Wanderers at the end of the 2010–11 season, after three and a half years at the club.

=== Maccabi Haifa ===
On 8 August 2011, Cohen signed a four-year deal with Israeli Maccabi Haifa. He rejected an offer from Greek side Panathinaikos in order to play in Israel where he can be closer to his family. Tamir earned €300,000, the highest salary in Maccabi Haifa.

== International career ==
Cohen made seven appearances for the Israel under-21 national al team. His first appearance on the U-21 team was on the losing side to Cyprus.

He played for the Israel national team against Croatia on 13 October 2007.

== Personal life ==
Cohen holds an Italian passport in addition to his Israeli one owing to his Italian ancestry. His citizenship of a European Union country gives him the option of playing for an EU football club without having to be classified as a foreigner.

He is the son of Maccabi Tel Aviv and Liverpool player Avi Cohen. Following his father's ultimately fatal motorcycle accident in December 2010, he flew to Israel to be at his father's bedside. On 24 April 2011, Cohen emotionally celebrated by taking off his shirt to reveal a picture of his father after scoring the winning goal in Bolton's 2–1 victory over Arsenal.

Cohen is also the nephew of the former Israeli association football player Vicky Peretz and the cousin of Peretz's sons, Adi Peretz and Omer Peretz.

== Career statistics ==
Appearances and goals by club, season and competition
Club	Season	League			National Cup		League Cup		Continental		Total	
Club	Season	Division	Apps	Goals	Apps	Goals	Apps	Goals	Apps	Goals	Apps	Goals
Maccabi Tel Aviv	2002–03	Israeli Premier League	13	0	3	0	9	0	0	0	25	0
Maccabi Tel Aviv	2003–04	Israeli Premier League	27	2	2	1	5	0	1	0	35	3
Maccabi Tel Aviv	2004–05	Israeli Premier League	22	2	4	0	1	0	9	0	36	2
Maccabi Tel Aviv	2005–06	Israeli Premier League	16	0	0	0	8	0	2	0	26	0
Maccabi Tel Aviv	2006–07	Israeli Premier League	3	0	0	0	5	0	0	0	8	0
Maccabi Tel Aviv	Total		81	4	9	1	28	0	12	0	130	5
Maccabi Netanya	2006–07	Israeli Premier League	14	1	1	0	2	0	0	0	17	1
Maccabi Netanya	2007–08	Israeli Premier League	13	1	0	0	2	0	2	0	17	1
Maccabi Netanya	Total		27	2	1	0	4	0	2	0	34	2
Bolton Wanderers	2007–08	Premier League	10	1	1	0	0	0	0	0	11	1
Bolton Wanderers	2008–09	Premier League	4	1	0	0	0	0	0	0	4	1
Bolton Wanderers	2009–10	Premier League	27	3	4	0	1	0	0	0	32	3
Bolton Wanderers	2010–11	Premier League	8	1	2	0	1	0	0	0	11	1
Bolton Wanderers	Total		49	6	7	0	2	0	0	0	58	6
Maccabi Haifa	2011–12	Israeli Premier League	14	0	0	0	0	0	6	0	20	0
Maccabi Haifa	2012–13	Israeli Premier League	3	0	1	0	3	0	0	0	7	0
Maccabi Haifa	Total		17	0	1	0	3	0	6	0	27	0
Hapoel Ra'anana	2013–14	Israeli Premier League	21	4	1	0	0	0	0	0	22	4
Career total			195	16	19	1	37	0	20	0	271	17

== Honours ==
Maccabi Tel Aviv

- Israeli Premier League: 2002–03
- Israel State Cup: 2004–05

== See also ==
- List of Israelis
- List of Jewish footballers
- List of select Jewish football (association; soccer) players
