= Ben Binyamin =

Israeli footballer

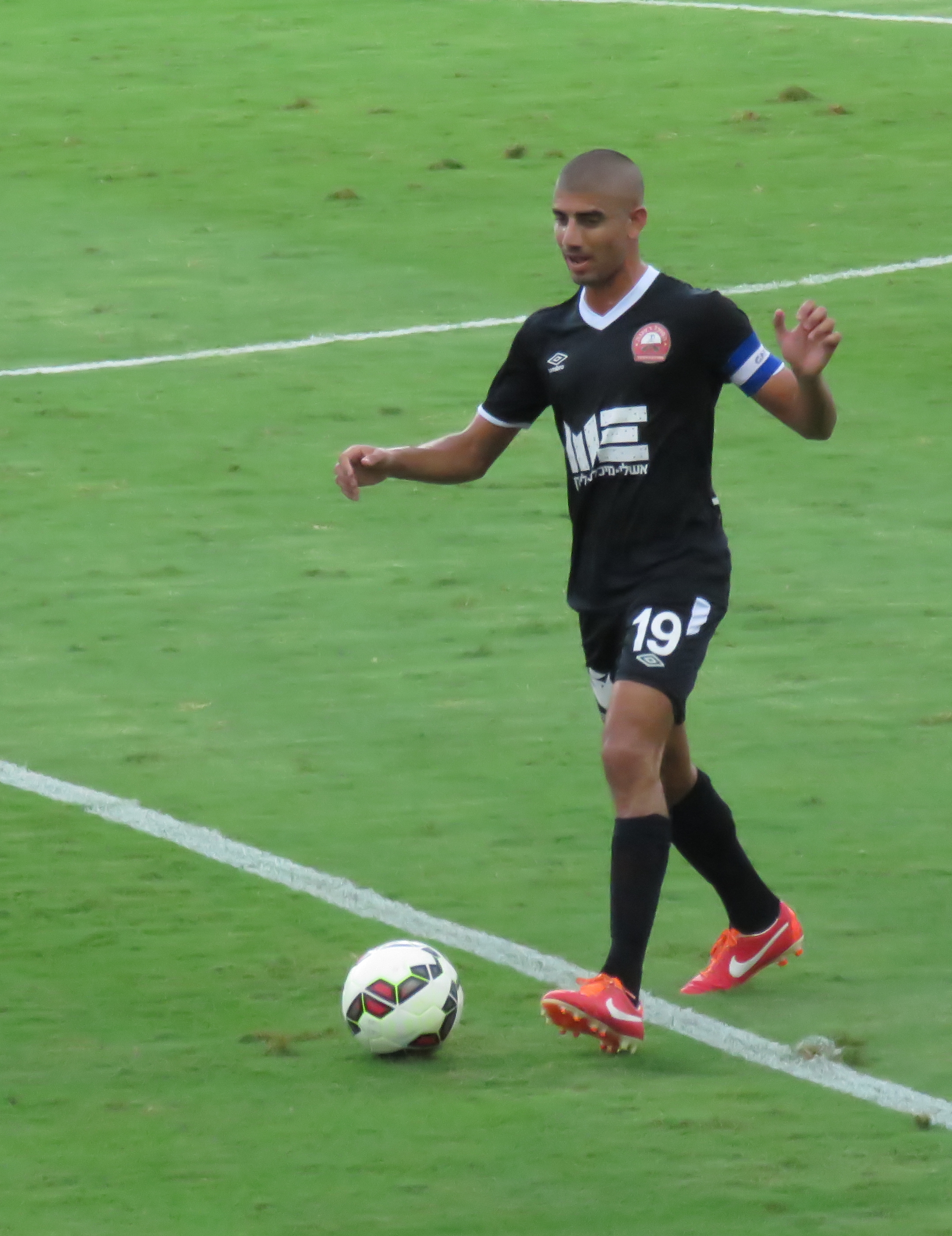
- Binyamin playing for Hapoel Ra'anana in 2015

Personal information
- Full name: Ben Binyamin
- Date of birth: 17 December 1985 (age 40)
- Place of birth: Nahariya, Israel
- Position: Midfielder

Youth career
- Hapoel Acre

Senior career*
Years	Team	Apps	(Gls)
2005–2011	Hapoel Acre	82	(0)
2005–2006	→ Maccabi Shlomi Nahariya	?	(?)
2006–2007	→ Hapoel Afula	26	(0)
2007–2008	→ Hapoel Herzliya	22	(0)
2011–2014	Maccabi Netanya	60	(1)
2013–2020	Hapoel Ra'anana	202	(1)
2020–2021	Hapoel Ramat HaSharon	1	(0)
2021	Maccabi Sha'arayim	9	(0)
2022–2023	Hapoel Lod	24	(0)
2023–2024	HaMakhtesh Givatayim	5	(0)
- * Club domestic league appearances and goals

Ben Binyamin (Hebrew: בן בנימין; born 17 December 1985) is an Israeli former footballer and currently assistant coach for Hapoel Beer Sheva.

== Club career statistics ==
(correct as of Feb 2013)

Club	Season	League			Cup			Toto Cup			Europe			Total		
Club	Season	Apps	Goals	Assists	Apps	Goals	Assists	Apps	Goals	Assists	Apps	Goals	Assists	Apps	Goals	Assists
Hapoel Afula	2006–07	26	0	0	2	1	0	0	0	0	0	0	0	28	1	0
Hapoel Herzliya	2007–08	22	0	0	1	0	0	0	0	0	0	0	0	23	0	0
Hapoel Acre	2008–09	27	0	0	1	0	0	7	0	1	0	0	0	35	0	1
Hapoel Acre	2009–10	24	0	1	1	0	0	0	0	0	0	0	0	25	0	1
Hapoel Acre	2010–11	31	0	1	1	0	0	3	0	0	0	0	0	35	0	1
Maccabi Netanya	2011–12	31	1	2	2	0	0	2	0	0	0	0	0	35	1	2
Maccabi Netanya	2012–13	29	0	0	1	0	0	5	0	0	0	0	0	34	0	0

== Honours ==
- Liga Leumit
  - Runner-up (1): 2008–09
