= Gal Nir =

Israeli footballer

Gal Nir גל ניר
Personal information
- Full name: Gal Nir
- Date of birth: March 30, 1983 (age 43)
- Place of birth: Rishon LeZion, Israel
- Position: Goalkeeper

Youth career
- 1989–1993: Hapoel Tel Aviv
- 1993–2000: Hapoel Ironi Rishon LeZion

Senior career*
Years	Team	Apps	(Gls)
2000–2002	Hapoel Ironi Rishon LeZion	1	(0)
2002–2003	Hapoel Kfar Saba	3	(0)
2003–2005	Maccabi Tel Aviv	13	(0)
2005–2009	Maccabi Netanya	3	(0)
2009–2013	Ironi Nir Ramat HaSharon	84	(0)
2013–2014	Hapoel Ra'anana	20	(0)
2014–2015	Maccabi Ahi Nazareth	8	(0)

International career
2002–2005	Israel U21	7	(0)
- * Club domestic league appearances and goals as of 26 July 2014

Gal Nir (Hebrew: גל ניר; born March 30, 1983) is an Israeli football (soccer) goalkeeper.

Nir began his career in the youth club of Hapoel Tel Aviv and moved later on to the youth club of Hapoel Ironi Rison LeZion, where he also played in the seniors team.

In 2002 Nir moved to Hapoel Kfar Saba but left after one season to Maccabi Tel Aviv, where he was for two seasons the second goalkeeper after Liran Strauber. He then moved to Maccabi Netanya, where he was the second goalkeeper after Avi Peretz.

Nir played for Maccabi Netanya, where he was the second goalkeeper after Liran Strauber. The interesting thing about it is, that also in Maccabi Tel Aviv he was the second goalkeeper after the same Strauber.

In June 2009 Nir signed with Ironi Nir Ramat HaSharon in the Liga Leumit where he will be the first choice in his position.

== Honours ==
- Israel State Cup:
  - 2005
- Toto Cup (Leumit):
  - 2010
- Liga Leumit:
  - 2010-11
