= Emri Zaid =

Israeli footballer

Emri Zaid אימרי זייד
Personal information
- Full name: Emri Zaid
- Date of birth: 10 March 1993 (age 33)
- Place of birth: Kiryat Tiv'on Israel
- Height: 1.82 m (6 ft 0 in)
- Position: Central defender

Team information
- Current team: Hapoel Afula

Youth career
- Maccabi Haifa

Senior career*
Years	Team	Apps	(Gls)
2012–2016	Maccabi Haifa	0	(0)
2013–2015	→ Maccabi Ahi Nazareth (loan)	47	(2)
2015–2016	→ Hapoel Afula (loan)	5	(0)
2016	Hapoel Beit She'an	10	(0)
2016–2018	Hapoel Asi Gilboa	41	(1)
2018–2019	Maccabi Ahi Nazareth	24	(0)
2019–2020	Hapoel Afula	28	(0)

International career
	Israel U16	6	(0)
	Israel U17	2	(0)
	Israel U18	3	(0)
	Israel U19	8	(0)
- * Club domestic league appearances and goals as of 1 June 2019

Emri Zaid (Hebrew: אימרי זייד; born 10 March 1993) is an Israeli footballer who plays as a defender. He currently plays for Hapoel Afula.

Emri Zaid is the great-grandson of Alexander Zaïd.
