= Dino Ndlovu =

South African soccer player

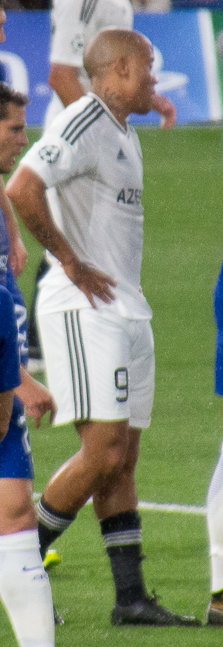
- Ndlovu with Qarabağ in 2017

Personal information
- Full name: Dino Ndlovu
- Date of birth: 15 February 1990 (age 36)
- Place of birth: Klerksdorp, South Africa
- Height: 1.83 m (6 ft 0 in)
- Position: Forward

Youth career
- Dona Young Stars
- Motherwell FC (South Africa)
- OI Celtic
- Digagabi FC
- Platinum Stars

Senior career*
| Years | Team | Apps | (Gls) |
| 2009–2011 | Mamelodi Sundowns | 0 | (0) |
| 2010–2011 | → Bloemfontein Celtic (loan) | 9 | (0) |
| 2011–2012 | Bnei Yehuda | 33 | (8) |
| 2012–2015 | Maccabi Haifa | 29 | (10) |
| 2014–2015 | → SuperSport United (loan) | 25 | (3) |
| 2015 | → Mpumalanga Black Aces (loan) | 8 | (1) |
| 2015–2016 | Anorthosis Famagusta | 32 | (17) |
| 2016–2018 | Qarabağ | 36 | (15) |
| 2018–2021 | Zhejiang Greentown | 65 | (41) |
| 2021–2022 | Kocaelispor | 15 | (9) |
| 2022 | Changchun Yatai | 9 | (1) |
| 2023 | Boluspor | 10 | (4) |
| 2023– | Sakaryaspor | 6 | (1) |

International career^{‡}
| 2009 | South Africa U23 | 2 | (3) |
| 2012– | South Africa | 8 | (1) |
- * Club domestic league appearances and goals as of 23 September 2023 ‡ National team caps and goals as of 13 October 2018

Dino Ndlovu (born 15 February 1990) is a South African professional soccer player who plays as a forward for TFF First League club Sakaryaspor and the South Africa national football team.

== Early life and career ==
Ndlovu hails from Jouberton near Klerksdorp. During his formative years, Ndlovu began playing soccer on the streets and when he was sixteen, he was afforded the opportunity to join an Academy of Excellence. He had to turn down the opportunity, however as it would have left his mother alone at home. He later traveled to Johannesburg where he slept in a train station bathroom for three days in order to attend soccer trials with Platinum Stars. He was offered a contract by the club and initially impressed in front of goal at youth level. His form dipped soon after, however, as the new source of income began to serve as a distraction and Platinum Stars elected not to renew his contract in 2011. At the time he was the breadwinner for his family, which included his pregnant wife.

== Club career ==
=== Bnei Yehuda ===
Following his release from Platinum Stars, Ndlovu was advised by his agent to leave South Africa. He trialled with Israeli side Bnei Yehuda who signed after just two days.

=== Anorthosis Famagusta ===
Ndlovu joined Anorthosis Famagusta in the 2015 summer, passed to the crowds warm attention on a friendly Anorthosis preparation games. Accomplished 6 goals in preparation friendly games only friendlies.

=== Qarabağ ===
On 12 August 2016 FK Qarabağ announced they had signed Ndlovu to a two-year contract. During the 2017–18 UEFA Champions League campaign, Ndlovu scored an away goal against FC Copenhagen which helped Qarabağ qualify for the group stages of the tournament for the first time in the club's history

=== Boluspor ===
On 10 January 2023, Ndlovu joined TFF First League club Boluspor.

== International career ==
He was recalled to the national team in October 2018. On 13 October, he was one of South Africa's goalscorers as the nation recorded its largest ever victory with a 6–0 win over Seychelles in an Africa Cup of Nations qualifier.

== Career statistics ==
=== Club ===
As of match played 7 April 2023

Appearances and goals by club, season and competition
| Club | Season | League | | | National Cup | | League Cup | | Continental | | Other | | Total | |
| Club | Season | Division | Apps | Goals | Apps | Goals | Apps | Goals | Apps | Goals | Apps | Goals | Apps | Goals |
|---|---|---|---|---|---|---|---|---|---|---|---|---|---|---|
| Mamelodi Sundowns | 2009–10 | Premier Soccer League | 0 | 0 | 0 | 0 | – | | – | | – | | 0 | 0 |
| Mamelodi Sundowns | 2010–11 | Premier Soccer League | 0 | 0 | 0 | 0 | – | | – | | – | | 0 | 0 |
| Mamelodi Sundowns | Total | | 0 | 0 | 0 | 0 | 0 | 0 | 0 | 0 | 0 | 0 | 0 | 0 |
| Bloemfontein Celtic (loan) | 2010–11 | Premier Soccer League | 9 | 0 | 1 | 0 | – | | – | | – | | 10 | 0 |
| Bnei Yehuda Tel Aviv | 2011–12 | Israeli Premier League | 33 | 8 | 1 | 1 | 0 | 0 | – | | – | | 34 | 9 |
| Bnei Yehuda Tel Aviv | 2012–13 | Israeli Premier League | 0 | 0 | 0 | 0 | 2 | 1 | 4 | 1 | – | | 6 | 2 |
| Bnei Yehuda Tel Aviv | Total | | 33 | 8 | 1 | 1 | 2 | 1 | 4 | 1 | 0 | 0 | 40 | 11 |
| Maccabi Haifa | 2012–13 | Israeli Premier League | 21 | 9 | 4 | 4 | 1 | 2 | – | | – | | 26 | 15 |
| Maccabi Haifa | 2013–14 | Israeli Premier League | 8 | 1 | 0 | 0 | 0 | 0 | 7 | 1 | – | | 15 | 2 |
| Maccabi Haifa | 2014–15 | Israeli Premier League | 0 | 0 | 0 | 0 | 0 | 0 | – | | – | | 0 | 0 |
| Maccabi Haifa | Total | | 29 | 10 | 4 | 4 | 1 | 2 | 7 | 1 | 0 | 0 | 41 | 17 |
| SuperSport United (loan) | 2013–14 | Premier Soccer League | 14 | 2 | 1 | 0 | 0 | 0 | – | | – | | 15 | 2 |
| SuperSport United (loan) | 2014–15 | Premier Soccer League | 11 | 1 | 0 | 0 | 3 | 0 | – | | – | | 14 | 1 |
| SuperSport United (loan) | Total | | 25 | 3 | 1 | 0 | 3 | 0 | 0 | 0 | 0 | 0 | 29 | 3 |
| Mpumalanga Black Aces (loan) | 2014–15 | Premier Soccer League | 8 | 1 | 2 | 1 | – | | – | | – | | 10 | 2 |
| Anorthosis Famagusta | 2015–16 | Cypriot First Division | 32 | 17 | 3 | 1 | – | | – | | – | | 35 | 18 |
| Qarabağ | 2016–17 | Azerbaijan Premier League | 23 | 10 | 4 | 4 | – | | 7 | 1 | – | | 34 | 15 |
| Qarabağ | 2017–18 | Azerbaijan Premier League | 13 | 5 | 0 | 0 | – | | 9 | 4 | – | | 20 | 8 |
| Qarabağ | Total | | 36 | 15 | 4 | 4 | 0 | 0 | 15 | 5 | 0 | 0 | 53 | 21 |
| Zhejiang Greentown | 2018 | China League One | 24 | 19 | 0 | 0 | – | | – | | – | | 24 | 19 |
| Zhejiang Greentown | 2019 | China League One | 27 | 17 | 0 | 0 | – | | – | | – | | 27 | 17 |
| Zhejiang Greentown | 2020 | China League One | 14 | 5 | 0 | 0 | – | | – | | 2 (Note: Appearance(s) in CSL Relegation play-offs) | 1 | 16 | 6 |
| Zhejiang Greentown | Total | | 65 | 41 | 0 | 0 | 0 | 0 | 0 | 0 | 2 | 1 | 67 | 41 |
| Kocaelispor | 2021–22 | TFF First League | 15 | 9 | 0 | 0 | – | | – | | – | | 15 | 9 |
| Changchun Yatai | 2022 | Chinese Super League | 9 | 1 | 0 | 0 | – | | – | | – | | 9 | 1 |
| Boluspor | 2022–23 | TFF First League | 10 | 4 | 0 | 0 | – | | – | | – | | 10 | 4 |
| Career total | | | 270 | 109 | 16 | 11 | 6 | 3 | 26 | 7 | 2 | 1 | 320 | 131 |

=== International ===
South Africa
| Year | Apps | Goals |
|---|---|---|
| 2012 | 3 | 0 |
| 2013 | 0 | 0 |
| 2014 | 1 | 0 |
| 2015 | 0 | 0 |
| 2016 | 0 | 0 |
| 2017 | 1 | 0 |
| 2018 | 1 | 1 |
| Total | 6 | 1 |

Statistics accurate as of match played 13 October 2018

=== International goals ===
Scores and results list South Africa's goal tally first.

| No. | Date | Venue | Opponent | Score | Result | Competition |
|---|---|---|---|---|---|---|
| 1. | 13 October 2018 | FNB Stadium, Johannesburg, South Africa | Seychelles | 5–0 | 6–0 | 2019 Africa Cup of Nations qualification |
