= Tamir Ben Ami =

Israeli footballer

Tamir Ben Ami תמיר בן עמי
Personal information
- Full name: Tamir Ben Ami
- Date of birth: February 28, 1979 (age 47)
- Place of birth: Ramat Gan, Israel
- Position: Left back

Youth career
- Hapoel Ramat Gan

Senior career*
Years	Team	Apps	(Gls)
1997–2014	Hapoel Ramat Gan	388	(20)
2003	→ Ironi Kiryat Shmona (loan)	4	(0)
Total		392	(20)

Managerial career
- 2014: Hapoel Ramat Gan
- * Club domestic league appearances and goals

Tamir Ben Ami (Hebrew: תמיר בן עמי) is an Israeli footballer who now works as a manager.

== Honours ==
- State Cup
  - 2003, 2013
- Liga Leumit
  - 2011–12
- Liga Artzit
  - 2006–07
- Toto Cup (Leumit)
  - 2011
- Toto Cup (Artzit)
  - 1999–2000, 2005–06, 2006–07
