= Avihai Yadin =

Israeli footballer

Avihai Yadin אביחי ידין
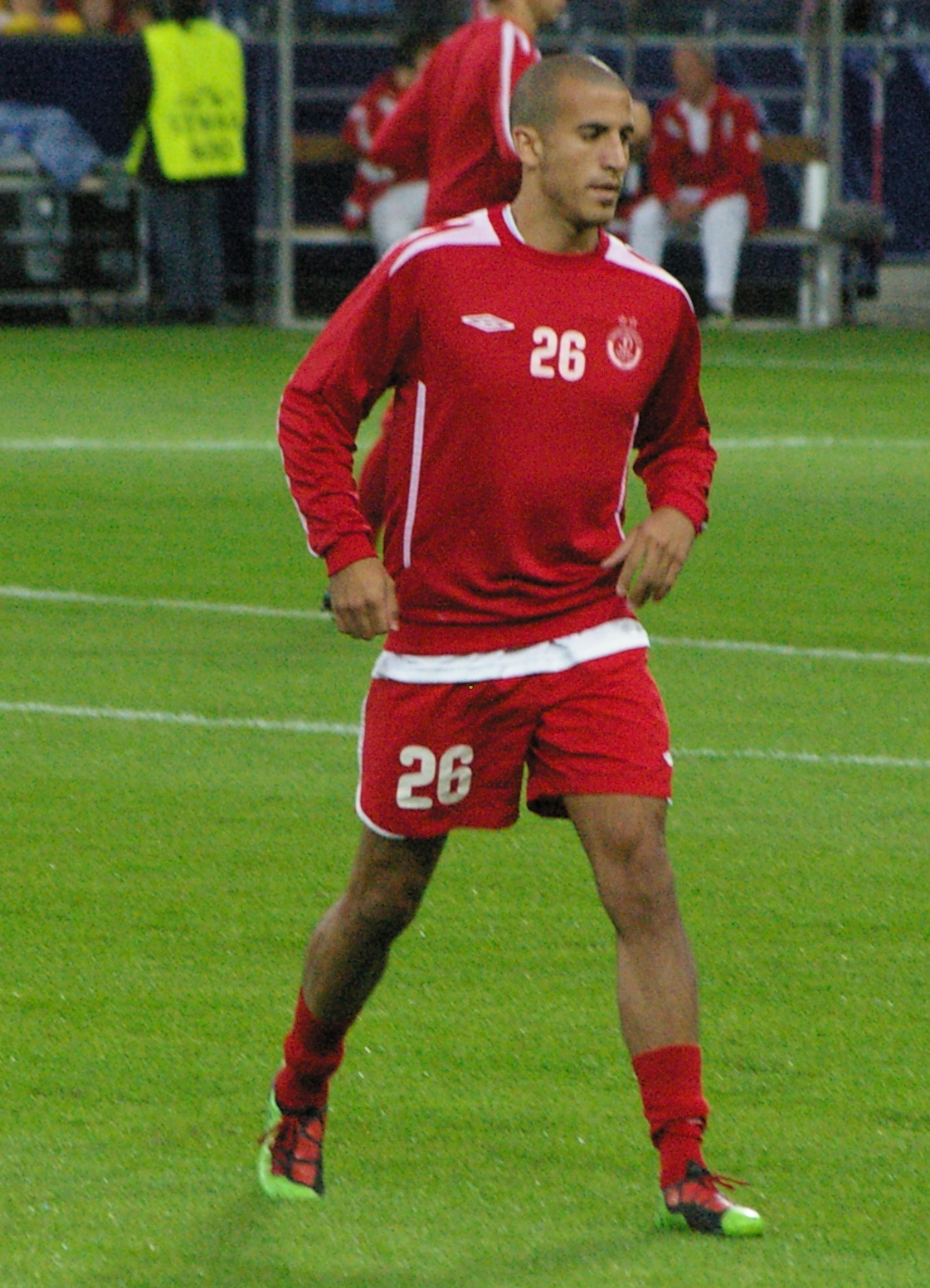
- Yadin with Hapoel Tel Aviv in 2009

Personal information
- Full name: Avihai Yadin
- Date of birth: 26 October 1986 (age 39)
- Place of birth: Hod Hasharon, Israel
- Height: 1.83 m (6 ft 0 in)
- Position: Defensive midfielder

Youth career
- Hapoel Kfar Saba

Senior career*
Years	Team	Apps	(Gls)
2006–2008	Hapoel Kfar Saba	65	(3)
2008–2012	Hapoel Tel Aviv	115	(5)
2012–2016	Maccabi Haifa	51	(0)
2016	→ Hapoel Tel Aviv	13	(0)
2016–2018	Hapoel Tel Aviv	44	(0)
2018–2020	Hapoel Ra'anana	35	(1)

International career
2009–2012	Israel	10	(0)
- * Club domestic league appearances and goals

Avihai Yadin (Hebrew: אביחי ידין; born 26 October 1986) is a former Israeli football defensive midfielder.

== Career ==
He started to play football as a child when he was part of Hapoel Kfar Saba and became a member of the senior side when he was 19 years old. In 3 years with the senior team he made 86 caps, 2 goals and 1 assist and then moved to Hapoel Tel Aviv. He won a championship and 3 Cups with the club and played more than 100 games. On 20 September 2012 he signed for 5 years at Maccabi Haifa.

== Club career statistics ==
(correct as of December 2013)

Club	Season	League			Cup			Toto Cup			Europe			Total		
Club	Season	Apps	Goals	Assists	Apps	Goals	Assists	Apps	Goals	Assists	Apps	Goals	Assists	Apps	Goals	Assists
Hapoel Kfar Saba	2005–06	20	0	0	0	0	0	7	0	0	0	0	0	27	0	0
Hapoel Kfar Saba	2006–07	28	1	0	1	0	0	10	0	0	0	0	0	39	1	0
Hapoel Kfar Saba	2007–08	19	1	1	0	0	0	3	0	0	0	0	0	22	1	1
Hapoel Tel Aviv	2008–09	25	0	0	0	0	0	2	0	0	1	0	0	28	0	0
Hapoel Tel Aviv	2009–10	34	3	0	4	0	0	1	0	0	11	1	0	50	4	0
Hapoel Tel Aviv	2010–11	28	0	1	5	0	0	1	0	0	11	0	2	45	0	3
Hapoel Tel Aviv	2011–12	25	2	0	3	0	0	3	0	0	6	1	0	37	3	0
Maccabi Haifa	2012–13	16	0	1	1	0	0	0	0	0	0	0	0	17	0	1
Career		195	7	3	14	0	0	27	0	0	29	2	2	265	9	5

== Honours ==
- Israel State Cup (3):
  - 2010, 2011, 2012
- Israeli Premier League (1):
  - 2009–10
