= Omer Peretz =

Israeli footballer

Omer Peretz עומר פרץ
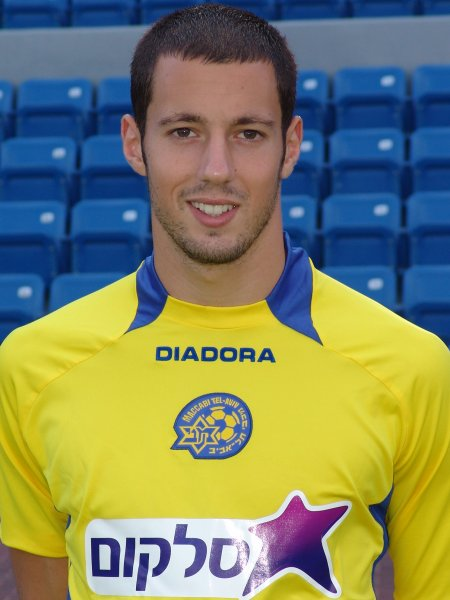
- Peretz with Maccabi Tel Aviv

Personal information
- Date of birth: 26 January 1986 (age 40)
- Place of birth: Tel Aviv, Israel
- Positions: Forward; defender

Team information
- Current team: Hapoel Petah Tikva (manager)

Youth career
- Maccabi Tel Aviv
- 2002–2005: Strasbourg

Senior career*
Years	Team	Apps	(Gls)
2004–2005	Strasbourg B	11	(2)
2005–2006	Hapoel Tel Aviv	24	(3)
2006–2008	Maccabi Tel Aviv	39	(1)
2008–2009	Ironi Kiryat Shmona	23	(1)
2009–2010	Hapoel Ramat Gan	7	(2)
2010–2011	Maccabi Herzliya	24	(3)
2011–2012	Sektzia Ness Ziona	20	(5)
2012–2015	Maccabi Netanya	73	(2)
Total		221	(19)

International career
2001–2003	Israel U17	17	(2)
2004	Israel U19	3	(0)
2006–2008	Israel U21	13	(0)

Managerial career
- 2016: Maccabi Netanya (assistant)
- 2016: Maccabi Netanya (caretaker manager)
- 2016–2017: Hapoel Ramat Gan (youth)
- 2017–2018: Hapoel Tel Aviv (youth)
- 2017: Hapoel Tel Aviv (caretaker)
- 2018–2019: Hakoah Amidar Ramat Gan
- 2019–2020: Hapoel Kfar Shalem
- 2020: Hapoel Rishon LeZion
- 2020–2022: Hapoel Kfar Shalem
- 2022–2023: Hapoel Kfar Saba
- 2023–2024: Bnei Yehuda
- 2024–: Hapoel Petah Tikva
- * Club domestic league appearances and goals

Omer Peretz (Hebrew: עומר פרץ; born 26 January 1986) is an Israeli football manager and former player who manages Hapoel Petah Tikva.

A forward and defender played at Hapoel Tel Aviv, Maccabi Tel Aviv and Maccabi Netanya.

His father, Vicky, was also a footballer who played the Israeli Premier League and in Ligue 1. Both his late uncle, Avi Cohen and his cousin Tamir Cohen played in the Israeli Premier League and the English Premier League.

== Honours ==
- Israel State Cup: 2006; runner-up 2014
- Liga Leumit: 2013–14
