= Kobi Baladev =

Israeli footballer

Kobi Beladev קובי בלדב
Personal information
- Full name: Jacob "Kobi" Beladev
- Date of birth: October 14, 1965 (age 61)
- Place of birth: Israel
- Height: 5 ft 10 in (1.78 m)
- Position: Goalkeeper

Team information
- Current team: Maccabi Netanya

Youth career
- Hapoel Nazareth Illit

Senior career*
Years	Team	Apps	(Gls)
1982–1984	Hapoel Nazareth Illit		
1984–1995	Maccabi Netanya	251	(0)
1995–1996	Maccabi Herzliya		

International career
- Israel U-19

Managerial career
- 2002: Maccabi Netanya (assistant manager)
- * Club domestic league appearances and goals

Kobi Beladev (Hebrew: קובי בלדב) is a former Israeli footballer. He is mainly known for playing with Maccabi Netanya for over ten years and also as the former CEO of the club.

== Honours ==
- Israeli Premier League:
  - Runner-up (1): 1987-88
- Toto Cup:
  - Runner-up (1): 1988-89
