= Kobi Musa =

Israeli footballer

Kobi Musa קובי מוסא
Personal information
- Full name: Kobi Musa
- Date of birth: April 18, 1982 (age 44)
- Place of birth: Tel Aviv, Israel
- Height: 1.77 m (5 ft 9 1/2 in)
- Position: Right back

Team information
- Current team: Hapoel Nir Ramat HaSharon

Youth career
- Shimshon Tel Aviv
- Maccabi Tel Aviv

Senior career*
Years	Team	Apps	(Gls)
2000–2008	Maccabi Tel Aviv	75	(1)
2005–2006	→ F.C. Ashdod (loan)	10	(0)
2008–2010	Hapoel Ramat Gan	62	(0)
2010–2011	Hapoel Ashkelon	10	(0)
2011–2012	Hapoel Rishon LeZion	50	(2)
2012–2014	Hapoel Nir Ramat HaSharon	64	(1)
2014–2015	Hapoel Petah Tikva	31	(0)
2015–2020	Haopel Nir Ramat HaSharon	51	(13)
- * Club domestic league appearances and goals

Kobi Musa (Hebrew: קובי מוסא; born April 18, 1982) is an Israeli footballer who plays for Hapoel Petah Tikva as a right back.
