= Liroy Zhairi =

Israeli footballer

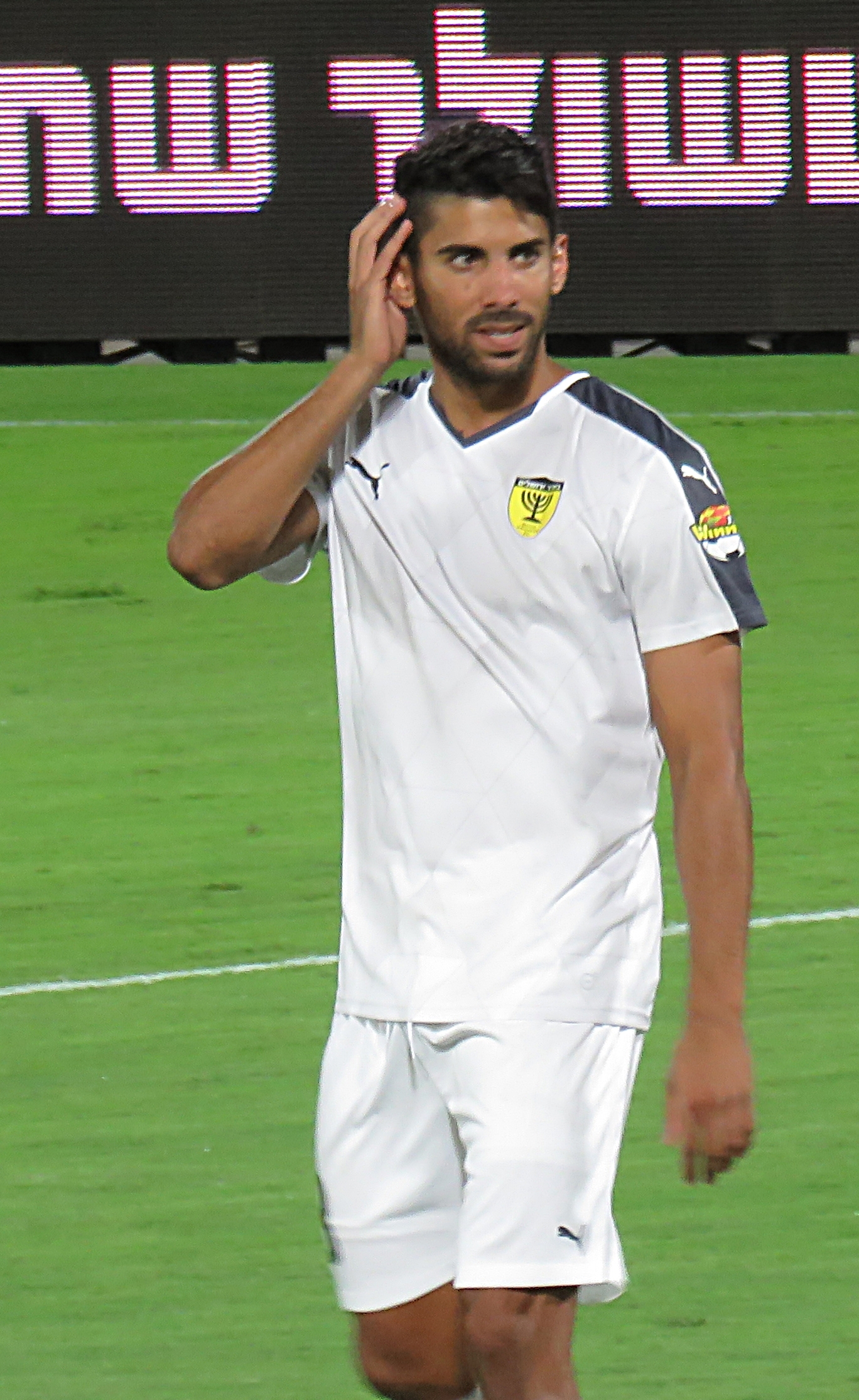
- Zhairi playing for Beitar Jerusalem in 2015

Personal information
- Full name: Liroy Zhairi
- Date of birth: 2 March 1989 (age 37)
- Place of birth: Magshimim, Israel
- Height: 1.75 m (5 ft 9 in)
- Position: Central midfielder

Youth career
- Bnei Yehuda Tel Aviv

Senior career*
Years	Team	Apps	(Gls)
2006–2011	Bnei Yehuda	94	(10)
2011–2013	KV Mechelen	15	(0)
2012–2013	→ Maccabi Haifa (loan)	18	(0)
2013–2014	Bnei Yehuda	26	(2)
2014–2015	Hapoel Petah Tikva	23	(4)
2015–2016	Beitar Jerusalem	25	(1)
2016–2018	Maccabi Petah Tikva	52	(6)
2018–2019	Beitar Jerusalem	7	(0)
2019	Ironi Kiryat Shmona	0	(0)
2019–2020	Hapoel Kfar Saba	7	(0)
2020–2021	Maccabi Herzliya	4	(0)

International career
2009–2010	Israel U-21	7	(2)
- * Club domestic league appearances and goals

Liroy Zhairi (Hebrew: לירוי צעירי; born 2 March 1989) is an Israeli former football midfielder.
