= Gal Barel =

Israeli footballer

Personal information
- Full name: Gal Barel
- Date of birth: June 15, 1990 (age 36)
- Place of birth: Ramat HaSharon, Israel
- Position: Central defender

Youth career
- 2003–2004: Maccabi Tel Aviv
- 2004–2008: Hapoel Ramat HaSharon
- 2008–2009: Beitar Jerusalem

Senior career*
| Years | Team | Apps | (Gls) |
| 2009–2014 | Ironi Ramat HaSharon | 113 | (4) |
| 2014–2015 | F.C. Ashdod | 6 | (0) |
| 2015–2016 | Hapoel Petah Tikva | 12 | (0) |
| 2017–2018 | Hapoel Ramat HaSharon | 44 | (0) |
| 2018–2020 | Hapoel Acre | 68 | (2) |
| 2020–2021 | Hapoel Ra'anana | 10 | (0) |
| 2021 | Maccabi Bnei Reineh | 14 | (3) |
| 2021–2022 | Hapoel Qalansawe | 8 | (2) |
- * Club domestic league appearances and goals

Gal Brael (Hebrew: גל בראל; born 15 June 1990) is an Israeli former footballer who played as a central defender.
