= Yisrael Zaguri =

Israeli footballer

Personal information
- Full name: Yisrael Zaguri
- Date of birth: 29 January 1990 (age 36)
- Place of birth: Acre, Israel
- Height: 1.78 m (5 ft 10 in)
- Position: Midfielder

Youth career
- Maccabi Haifa

Senior career*
| Years | Team | Apps | (Gls) |
| 2008–2012 | Maccabi Haifa | 12 | (0) |
| 2010–2011 | → Hapoel Petah Tikva (loan) | 28 | (2) |
| 2011–2012 | → Bnei Yehuda (loan) | 26 | (1) |
| 2012–2013 | Hapoel Ramat Gan | 30 | (7) |
| 2013–2017 | Hapoel Tel Aviv | 73 | (9) |
| 2015–2016 | → Maccabi Netanya (loan) | 4 | (0) |
| 2017 | Beitar Jerusalem | 13 | (1) |
| 2017–2019 | Bnei Sakhnin | 37 | (0) |
| 2018 | → Hapoel Ashkelon (loan) | 11 | (0) |
| 2019–2020 | Maccabi Petah Tikva | 8 | (0) |
| 2020–2021 | Hapoel Ramat Gan | 28 | (2) |
| 2021 | Hapoel Umm al-Fahm | 0 | (0) |
| 2021–2022 | Bnei Yehuda | 19 | (1) |
| 2023 | Hapoel Migdal HaEmek | 12 | (0) |

International career
| 2008–2010 | Israel U19 | 15 | (2) |
| 2011–2013 | Israel U21 | 6 | (1) |
- * Club domestic league appearances and goals

Yisrael Zaguri (Hebrew: ישראל זגורי; born 29 January 1990) is an Israeli former professional association football player.

== Honours ==
=== Club ===
Maccabi Haifa

- Israeli Premier League: 2008–09

Hapoel Ramat Gan

- Israel State Cup: 2013
