= Avi Peretz (footballer) =

Israeli footballer and coach

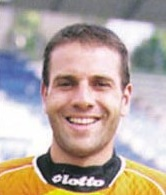
- Peretz with Maccabi Haifa in 2004

Personal information
- Full name: Avraham Peretz
- Date of birth: September 2, 1971 (age 55)
- Place of birth: Bat Yam, Israel
- Position: Goalkeeper

Youth career
- Maccabi Jaffa
- Hapoel Be'er Sheva
- Hapoel Arad

Senior career*
| Years | Team | Apps | (Gls) |
| 1990–1992 | Maccabi Yavne | 15 | (-) |
| 1992–1994 | Hapoel Bat Yam | 16 | (-) |
| 1994–1995 | Hapoel Ashkelon | 30 | (-) |
| 1995–1997 | Hapoel Be'er Sheva | 35 | (-) |
| 1997–1999 | Hapoel Haifa | 30 | (0) |
| 1999–2001 | Maccabi Haifa | 45 | (-) |
| 2001–2003 | Hapoel Haifa | 42 | (-) |
| 2003–2004 | Beitar Jerusalem | - | (-) |
| 2004–2006 | Maccabi Netanya | 66 | (0) |
| 2006–2007 | Hapoel Ashkelon | 33 | (0) |
| 2007–2008 | Hapoel Petah Tikva | 32 | (0) |
| 2008–2009 | Hapoel Bnei Lod | 5 | (0) |

Managerial career
- 2009–2010: Hapoel Haifa (goalkeeping coach)
- 2010–2012: Maccabi Netanya (goalkeeping coach)
- 2012–2013: Maccabi Haifa (goalkeeping coach)
- 2013–2015: Hapoel Haifa (goalkeeping coach)
- * Club domestic league appearances and goals

Avi Peretz (Hebrew: אבי פרץ; born September 2, 1971) is an Israeli former football player who last worked as a goalkeeping coach in Hapoel Haifa. In June 2020, he became the chairman of the Israel Tennis Association.

== Career ==
Avi Peretz was born in Beersheba, a city in the middle part of Israel.

Avi Peretz began playing at the youth team of Hapoel Be'er Sheva in the 80's. Later he moved on to Hapoel Arad and then to Maccabi Jaffa. In 1991, he played for Maccabi Yavne and two years later he moved to Hapoel Bat Yam, where he played for two years. At the end of the year he moved to Hapoel Ashkelon and one year later he moved to Hapoel Be'er Sheva.

In 1997, he moved to Hapoel Haifa and in 1999 he moved to Maccabi Haifa. In 2001, he moved back to Hapoel Haifa and in 2003 he moved to Beitar Jerusalem.

In July 2004 he moved to Maccabi Netanya and helped them get promoted to the Israeli Premier League. After two successful seasons in Netanya he moved back to Hapoel Ashkelon and a year after that he signed a one-year contract with Hapoel Petah Tikva.

He played in Hapoel Bnei Lod until July 2009 when he retired from playing after 19 years.

He worked as a goalkeeper coach, having worked for Hapoel Haifa, Maccabi Netanya and Maccabi Haifa.

Since 2015 he is one of the partners of Golden Tennis Netanya. In 2020, he was elected as a president of the (ITA) Israeli Tennis Association for a four-year term

== Honours ==
Winner:

- Israeli Premier League (2):
  - 1998-99, 2000–01
- State Cup (1):
  - 1997
- Toto Cup (Leumit) (2):
  - 2004-05, 2007–08

Runner-up:

- State Cup (1):
  - 2007
- Liga Leumit (2):
  - 2004-05, 2007–08
