= Paty Yeye Lenkebe =

Congolese footballer

Personal information
- Full name: Paty Yeye Lenkebe
- Date of birth: February 2, 1982 (age 44)
- Height: 1.88 m (6 ft 2 in)
- Position: Center back

Senior career*
Years	Team	Apps	(Gls)
2002–2006	AS Vita Kinshasa	?	(?)
2006–2007	Maccabi Herzliya	26	(4)
2007–2011	Bnei Sakhnin	125	(5)
2011–2015	Ironi Ashdod	117	(6)
2016–2018	Maccabi Ahi Nazareth	73	(9)

International career^{‡}
2004	DR Congo	1	(0)
- * Club domestic league appearances and goals as of 12 August 2018 ‡ National team caps and goals as of 24 April 2010

Paty Yeye Lenkebe (born February 2, 1982) is a retired Congolese footballer who last played for Israeli side Maccabi Ahi Nazareth.
