= Eyal Tartazky =

Israeli footballer

Eyal Tartazky אייל טרטצקי
Personal information
- Date of birth: September 13, 1977 (age 49)
- Place of birth: Haifa, Israel
- Height: 1.77 m (5 ft 9 1/2 in)
- Position: Left back

Youth career
- Hapoel Haifa

Senior career*
Years	Team	Apps	(Gls)
1998–2000	Hapoel Haifa	21	(0)
2000–2002	Maccabi Herzliya	?	(?)
2002–2003	Hapoel Haifa	26	(0)
2003–2007	Maccabi Herzliya	?	(?)
2007–2013	Hapoel Haifa	95	(3)
2014–2015	F.C. Haifa		
- * Club domestic league appearances and goals as of October 19, 2010

Eyal Tartazky (Hebrew: אייל טרטצקי; born September 13, 1977) is a former Israeli footballer.

== Career ==
Tartazky began his career in the youth club of Hapoel Haifa and flighted to the elder team in 1998. In the season 1998/99 won the championship with Hapoel Haifa.

In 2000, he moved to Maccabi Herzliya, and he returned to Hapoel Haifa in 2002. Tartazky returned to Maccabi Herzliya in 2003.

Tartazky was a captain of Maccabi Herzliya in the years 2003–2007. In the season 2006/07 Tartazky won the Toto Cup with Maccabi Herzliya.

In 2007 Tartazky returned to Hapoel Haifa, where he also captain.

== Honours ==
- Israeli Premier League:
  - Winner (1): 1998–99
- Toto Cup:
  - Winner (1): 2006–07
