= Shimon Abuhatzira =

Israeli footballer

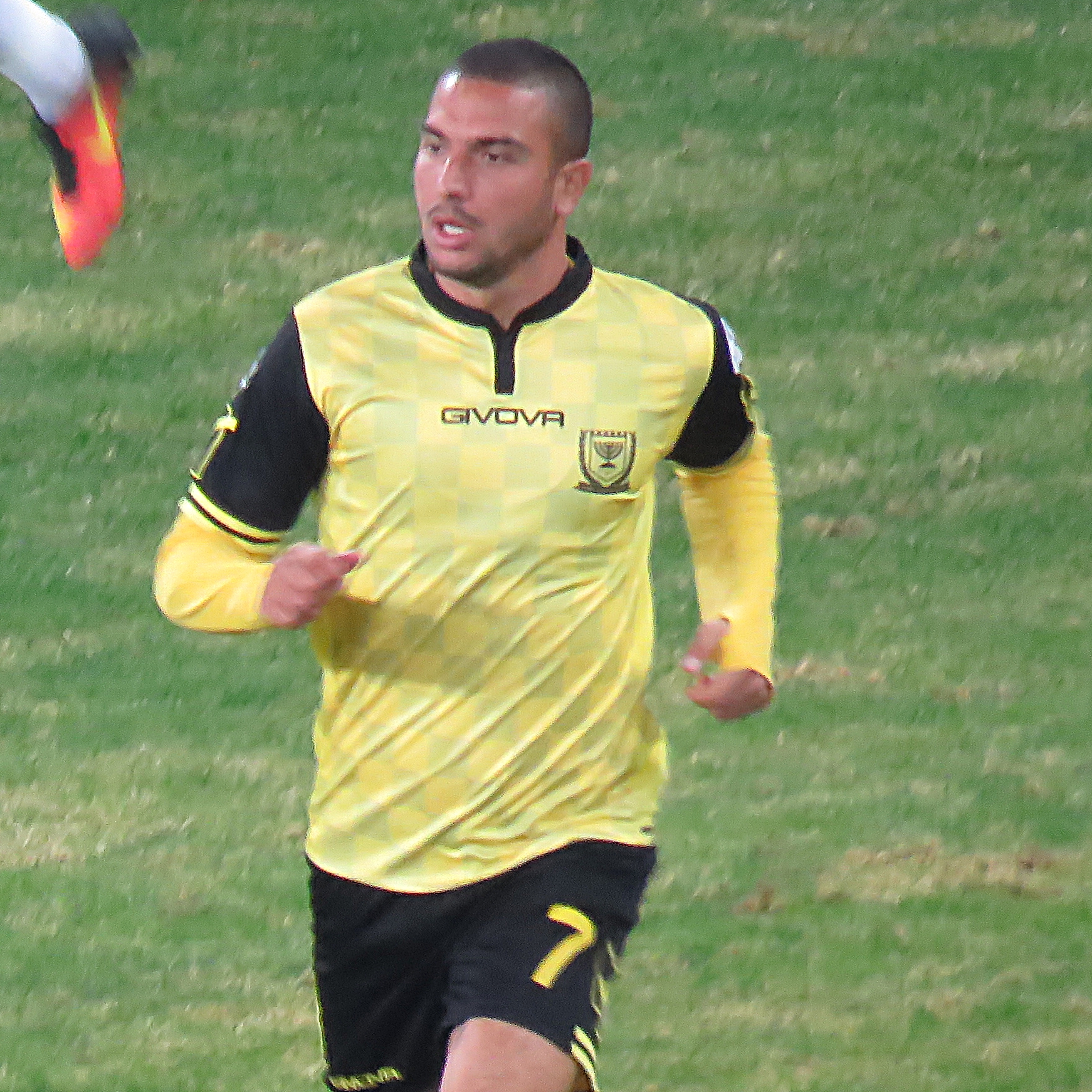
- Abuhatzira playing for Beitar Jerusalem in 2016

Personal information
- Date of birth: 10 October 1986 (age 40)
- Place of birth: Netanya, Israel
- Height: 1.86 m (6 ft 1 in)
- Position: Striker

Youth career
- 1999–2003: Beitar Nes Tubruk
- 2003–2006: Hapoel Petah Tikva

Senior career*
Years	Team	Apps	(Gls)
2006–2009	Hapoel Petah Tikva	103	(21)
2009–2011	AEL	19	(3)
2011	→ Ironi Kiryat Shmona (loan)	14	(7)
2011–2013	Ironi Kiryat Shmona	66	(28)
2013–2016	Maccabi Haifa	29	(4)
2015	→ Ironi Kiryat Shmona (loan)	14	(2)
2016–2017	Beitar Jerusalem	15	(3)
2017–2018	Hapoel Raanana	41	(13)
2018–2019	Ironi Kiryat Shmona	17	(1)
2019–2020	Hapoel Ramat HaSharon	24	(10)

International career
2004–2005	Israel U19	7	(1)
2008	Israel U21	3	(1)
2012–2013	Israel	3	(1)
- * Club domestic league appearances and goals

Shimon Abuhatzira (or Abu Hazira, Hebrew: שמעון אבו חצירא; born 10 October 1986) is an Israeli retired footballer who played as a striker.

== Early life ==
Abuhatzira was born in Netanya, Israel, to a family of Sephardic Jewish descent.

== Club career ==
Abuhatzira started to play football as a kid when he was part of Beitar Nes Tubruk. In 2003, he moved to Hapoel Petah Tikva, and became a member of the senior side when he was 19 years old. In three years with the senior team he made 125 caps, 28 goals and 5 assists.

On 21 May 2009, it was said that Abuhatzira agreed to sign a two-year contract with Greek club AEL without Hapoel Petah Tikva's permission. On 22 June 2009, Larissa's official website named him as a newcomer on an article about the club's first training for the 2009–10 season. The official announcement about his transfer was made on 1 July 2009. He was released from the club after scoring 3 goals in 19 caps.

In January 2011, Abuhatzira returned to Israel and signed for Ironi Kiryat Shmona, after half a good season, he scored 7 goals and reached the Israeli State Cup semi final. At the end of the season Abuhatzira signed a new three-year deal.

In December 2011 Abuhatzira extended his contract in Ironi Kiryat Shmona for more four years, at the end of the season his team won the first championship in its history, and he finished as top scorer of the team with 13 goals and 6 assists in addition he help his team to win the Toto Cup 4–3 on penalties after a 1–1 draw against Hapoel Tel Aviv.

In his third season with Kiryat Shmona Abuhatzira scored 15 league goals including 4 goals against Hapoel Tel Aviv at the Bloomfield Stadium and 24 goals in all competitions he played with Kiryat Shmona in the Europa League and scored 3 goals including a brace against Lyon. In addition Kiryat Shmona got to the Israeli State Cup final, and scored the first goal against Hapoel Ramat Gan, but eventually his team lost 4–2 on penalties after a 1–1 draw.

On 24 June 2013 he signed with Israeli giants Maccabi Haifa.

On 25 May 2018, Abuhatzira returned to Israeli Premier League club Ironi Kiryat Shmona.

== International career ==
On 16 October 2012, Abuhatzira made his debut on the national team, when he came on as a substitute in the game against Luxembourg in 2014 FIFA World Cup qualifiers. On 2 June 2013, he scored his debut goal, in a friendly match against Honduras.

== Personal life ==
On 18 May 2009, Abuhatzira married his Israeli girlfriend Reut in a Jewish ceremony at Tel Ya, a wedding hall in kibbutz Tel Yitzhak, Israel.

== Career statistics ==
=== Club ===
As of March 2013

Appearances and goals by club, season and competition
Club	Season	League		Cup		Toto Cup		Europe		Total	
Club	Season	Apps	Goals	Apps	Goals	Apps	Goals	Apps	Goals	Apps	Goals
Hapoel Petah Tikva	2005–06	14	0	0	0	7	0	0	0	21	0
Hapoel Petah Tikva	2006–07	29	3	1	0	6	3	0	0	36	6
Hapoel Petah Tikva	2007–08	26	4	2	2	8	0	0	0	36	6
Hapoel Petah Tikva	2008–09	28	14	0	0	4	1	0	0	32	15
AEL	2009–10	13	3	0	0	0	0	0	0	13	3
AEL	2010	6	0	1	0	0	0	0	0	7	0
Hapoel Ironi Kiryat Shmona	2011	14	7	4	1	0	0	0	0	18	8
Hapoel Ironi Kiryat Shmona	2011–12	37	13	2	0	6	2	0	0	45	15
Hapoel Ironi Kiryat Shmona	2012–13	29	15	4	4	3	0	11	5	47	24
Maccabi Haifa	2013–14	7	0	0	0	0	0	6	2	13	2
Career		203	59	14	7	34	6	17	7	269	79

=== International ===
Scores and results list Israel's goal tally first.

Goal	Date	Venue	Opponent	Score	Result	Competition
1.	2 June 2013	Citi Field, New York City, USA	Honduras	2–0	2–0	Friendly

== Honours ==
Ironi Kiryat Shmona

- Israeli Premier League (1): 2011–12
- Toto Cup (2): 2010–11, 2011–12

Maccabi Haifa

- Israel State Cup (1): 2015–16

Individual

Hapoel Petah Tikva

- Israeli Premier League – 2008–09 Top Goalscorer
