= Imoro Lukman =

Ghanaian footballer

Personal information
- Full name: Imoro Lukman
- Date of birth: October 4, 1984 (age 42)
- Place of birth: Ghana
- Height: 1.80 m (5 ft 11 in)
- Position: Center back

Team information
- Current team: Hapoel Petah Tikva

Senior career*
Years	Team	Apps	(Gls)
2002	Real Sportive	0	(0)
2002–2005	Maccabi Netanya	22	(1)
2005–2008	Bnei Yehuda Tel Aviv	106	(7)
2008–2010	AEP Paphos	48	(7)
2010–2011	APOP	20	(2)
2011–2012	Nea Salamina	9	(0)
2012	Hapoel Rishon LeZion	12	(0)
2012–2013	Hapoel Acre	16	(0)
2013	Bnei Sakhnin	8	(0)
2013–2014	Hapoel Petah Tikva	34	(2)
2014–2016	Hapoel Bnei Lod	63	(5)
2016–2017	Hapoel Petah Tikva	7	(0)

International career
- Ghana U-20
2003	Ghana	1	(0)
- * Club domestic league appearances and goals as of 15 August 2016

Imoro Lukman (born October 4, 1984) is a Ghanaian football player who played in Israel for Hapoel Petah Tikva football club.

== Career ==
Lukman started his career with Real Sportive and later on he moved to Maccabi Netanya from the Israeli Premier League. He played for Netanya for 2.5 years before he was transferred to Bnei Yehuda. He had a very successful run in Bnei Yehuda and played for the club for over 3 seasons.

In the summer of 2008 he moved to play in the Cypriot First Division as he signed a two years contract with AEP Paphos. In the 2010–11 season he played for APOP Kinyras. At the start of the 2011–12 season he moved to Nea Salamis Famagusta and later on in January 2012 he returned to play in Israel as he signed for Hapoel Rishon LeZion.

In the summer of 2012, Lukman signed a four-year contract with Hapoel Acre but was released from the club in February 2013. He joined Bnei Sakhnin after he was released from Acre. In June 2013 he moved to Hapoel Petah Tikva. The next season, he moved to Hapoel Bnei Lod.

== International career ==
Lukman played for the Black Satellites in the 2003 African Youth Championship. Later on that year, Lukman won his first and only cap for the senior side.

== Honours ==
- Israel State Cup
  - Runner-up (1): 2006
- Liga Leumit
  - Runner-up (1): 2013–14
