= 2012–13 Israel State Cup =

Tournament details
- Country: Israel

Final positions
- Champions: Hapoel Ramat Gan (2nd title)
- Runners-up: Ironi Kiryat Shmona

The 2012–13 Israel State Cup (Hebrew: גביע המדינה, Gvia HaMedina) was the 74th season of Israel's nationwide football cup competition and the 59th after the Israeli Declaration of Independence. It began on 31 August 2012, while the final was held in Netanya Stadium on 8 May 2013.

The competition was won by Hapoel Ramat Gan who had beaten Ironi Kiryat Shmona 4–2 on penalties after 1–1 in the final.

By winning, Hapoel Ramat Gan, qualified for the 2013–14 UEFA Europa League, entering in the Third qualifying round.

== Calendar ==
Round	Date
First round	August 31, September 1–3, 6–8, 2012
Second round	September 7, 10 and 21–22, October 2, 9, 2012
Third round	September 14–15, October 16–17, 2012
Fourth round	September 21–22, October 30, November 6, 2012
Fifth round	September 21–24, 2012
Sixth round	November 12–13, 16–17, 26–27, December 11, 2012
Seventh Round	December 31, 2012, January 1–2, 2013
Eighth Round	January 29–30, 2013
Round of 16	February 26–27, 2013
Quarter-finals	March 12–13, 2013
Semi-finals	April 17, 2013
Final	May 8, 2013

== Results ==
=== Seventh Round ===
The 16 winners from the previous round of the competition join 12 Liga Leumit clubs in this stage of the competition. The other 4 clubs from Liga Leumit received a bye for the next round. These matches were played on 1 and 2 January 2013.

Home team	Score	Away team
Hapoel Ortodoxim Lod	1−3	Hapoel Asi Gilboa
Hapoel Daliyat al-Karmel	0−2	Beitar Tel Aviv Ramla
F.C. Bnei Jaffa Ortodoxim	0−3 (a.e.t.)	Sektzia Nes Tziona
Maccabi Sektzia Ma'alot-Tarshiha	1−3	Maccabi Umm al-Fahm
Maccabi Kabilio Jaffa	1−1 (a.e.t.); 3–4 p.	Hapoel Nazareth Illit
Hapoel Azor	3−2 (a.e.t.)	Hakoah Amidar Ramat Gan
Shimshon Bnei Tayibe	1−6	Maccabi Ahi Nazareth
Hapoel Rishon LeZion	2−0	Hapoel Katamon Jerusalem
Hapoel Jerusalem	0−0 (a.e.t.); 2–3 p.	Hapoel Afula
Hapoel Herzliya	2−1	Beitar Kfar Saba Shlomi
Hapoel Kfar Saba	3−1	F.C. Karmiel Safed
Hapoel Ashkelon	4−1	Maccabi Kiryat Gat
Ahva Umm al-Fahm	0−1	Beitar Nahariya
Hapoel Ra'anana	2−0	Maccabi Petah Tikva

=== Eighth Round ===
The 14 winners from the previous round of the competition join the 4 clubs from Liga Leumit, which received a bye for this round and the 16 clubs from the Israeli Premier League in this stage of the competition. These matches were played on 29 and 30 January 2013.

Home team	Score	Away team
Hapoel Asi Gilboa	1−0	Hapoel Petah Tikva
Sektzia Nes Tziona	0−5	Hapoel Ra'anana
Ironi Nir Ramat HaSharon	1−2	Maccabi Yavne
Hapoel Acre	1−2	Hapoel Afula
Hapoel Rishon LeZion	2−1	Maccabi Ahi Nazareth
Beitar Jerusalem	5−0	Maccabi Umm al-Fahm
Hapoel Ashkelon	6−1	Beitar Nahariya
Beitar Tel Aviv Ramla	0−1	Hapoel Bnei Lod
Maccabi Netanya	0−2	Maccabi Tel Aviv
Hapoel Nazareth Illit	1−1 (a.e.t.); 2–4 p.	Bnei Sakhnin
Hapoel Herzliya	0−4	Ironi Kiryat Shmona
Hapoel Kfar Saba	2−1 (a.e.t.)	Maccabi Herzliya
Hapoel Ramat Gan	2−0	Ashdod
Bnei Yehuda Tel Aviv	0−2	Hapoel Haifa
Hapoel Azor	0−4	Maccabi Haifa
Hapoel Be'er Sheva	1−2 (a.e.t.)	Hapoel Tel Aviv

=== Round of 16 ===
The 16 winners of the previous round entered this stage of the competition. These matches took place on 26 and 27 February 2013.

Home team	Score	Away team
Hapoel Ramat Gan	5−3 (a.e.t.)	Hapoel Afula
Hapoel Kfar Saba	0−1	Hapoel Tel Aviv
Hapoel Bnei Lod	2−3	Bnei Sakhnin
Hapoel Rishon LeZion	2−2 (a.e.t.); 4−3 p.	Hapoel Ra'anana
Maccabi Haifa	2−1	Hapoel Haifa
Hapoel Asi Gilboa	1−1 (a.e.t.); 4–2 p.	Hapoel Ashkelon
Maccabi Tel Aviv	0−2	Beitar Jerusalem
Ironi Kiryat Shmona	2−0	Maccabi Yavne

=== Quarter-finals ===
The eight winners of the previous round entered this stage of the competition. These matches took place on 12 and 13 March 2013.

Home team	Score	Away team
Hapoel Asi Gilboa	1−2	Hapoel Ramat Gan
Bnei Sakhnin	1−3	Ironi Kiryat Shmona
Hapoel Rishon LeZion	1−0	Hapoel Tel Aviv
Beitar Jerusalem	0−3	Maccabi Haifa

=== Semi-finals ===
The four winners of the previous round entered this stage of the competition. These matches took place on 17 April 2013.

Home team	Score	Away team
Ironi Kiryat Shmona	2−1 (a.e.t.)	Maccabi Haifa
Hapoel Rishon LeZion	1−2	Hapoel Ramat Gan

=== Final ===
May 8, 2013
20:00 UTC+3

Ironi Kiryat Shmona	1 – 1	Hapoel Ramat Gan
Abuhatzira 17'	Report	Buchsenbaum 52'
Penalties
Solari (penalty scored); Gabai (penalty scored); Hasarma (penalty missed); Einbinder (penalty missed)	2 – 4	(penalty scored) Goga; (penalty scored) Reuven; (penalty scored) Burgič; (penalty scored) Zaguri

Netanya Stadium, Netanya
Attendance: 8,621
Referee: Eytan Tbryzy
