= Osei Mawuli =

Ghanaian footballer

Personal information
- Full name: Osei Mawuli
- Date of birth: 2 October 1989 (age 37)
- Place of birth: Ghana
- Height: 1.83 m (6 ft 0 in)
- Position: Forward

Youth career
- Liberty Professionals

Senior career*
Years	Team	Apps	(Gls)
2008–2011	Liberty Professionals		
2011–2014	Hapoel Ashkelon	61	(30)
2012–2013	→ Ironi Kiryat Shmona	14	(2)
2014–2015	Hapoel Haifa	10	(0)
2015	Hapoel Bnei Lod	14	(5)
2016	Hapoel Nazareth Illit	7	(2)
2017	Maccabi Sha'arayim	9	(1)
2018	Asante Kotoko	7	(0)
2018–2019	Mekelle 70 Enderta		
2019–2021	Fasil Kenema		
2021	Sebeta City		
2021–2023	Bahir Dar Kenema	28	(14)
2023–2024	Fasil Kenema	13	(4)
- * Club domestic league appearances and goals as of 5 July 2023

Osei Mawuli (born 2 October 1989) is a Ghanaian professional footballer who plays as a forward.
