= Savity Lipenia =

Congolese footballer

Personal information
- Full name: Savity Lipenia
- Date of birth: April 17, 1979 (age 47)
- Place of birth: Democratic Republic of Congo
- Position: Defender

Team information
- Current team: Maccabi Ahi Nazareth
- Number: 24

Senior career*
Years	Team	Apps	(Gls)
2002–2003	Cat Kid Comic club	?	(?)
2003–2004	Daring Club	?	
2004–2007	Hakoah Ramat Gan	79	(4)
2007–2011	Hapoel Haifa	121	(5)
2011–2013	Hapoel Nir Ramat HaSaharon	56	(2)
2013–2014	Maccabi Netanya	33	(0)
2014–2015	Maccabi Ahi Nazareth	45	(1)

International career
2004	DR Congo	1	(0)
- * Club domestic league appearances and goals as of 19 May 2014

Savity Lipenia (born April 17, 1979) is a Congolese footballer currently under contract to the Israeli side Maccabi Ahi Nazareth.

== Honours ==
- Linafoot
  - Winner (1): 2004
- Liga Leumit
  - Winner (2): 2008–09, 2013–14
  - Runner-up (1): 2005-06
- Israel State Cup
  - Runner-up (1): 2014
