= Touvarno Pinas =

Dutch footballer

Personal information
- Full name: Touvarno Pinas
- Date of birth: November 25, 1985 (age 40)
- Place of birth: Wanica, Suriname
- Height: 1.72 m (5 ft 7 1/2 in)
- Positions: Full back; defensive midfielder

Team information
- Current team: DWS

Youth career
- KBV
- Neerlandia
- AZ
- RKC Waalwijk

Senior career*
Years	Team	Apps	(Gls)
2005–2006	RKC Waalwijk	1	(0)
2006–2009	Telstar	85	(3)
2009–2011	Almere City	66	(1)
2011–2014	Maccabi Netanya	82	(1)
2013	→ Hapoel Haifa (loan)	15	(0)
2014–2016	Ironi Kiryat Shmona	19	(0)
2016	Hapoel Ramat Gan	11	(1)
2018	OFC Oostzaan		
2019–2020	DWS		
- * Club domestic league appearances and goals

Touvarno Pinas (born November 25, 1985) is a retired Dutch footballer who played as a left wingback, mostly known for playing for Telstar and for Maccabi Netanya.

== Honours ==
- Toto Cup
  - Winner (1): 2012-13
- Liga Leumit
  - Winner (1): 2013-14
- Israel State Cup
  - Runner-up (1): 2014
- Israeli Premier League
  - Runner-up (1): 2014-15

== Personal life ==
He holds a Dutch passport.
