= 2014–15 Maccabi Tel Aviv F.C. season =

Maccabi Tel Aviv F.C.
2014–15 season
- President: Mitchell Goldhar
- Manager: (Spain) Óscar García (until 25 August) (Spain) Pako Ayestarán (from 25 August)
- Stadium: Bloomfield Stadium, Tel Aviv
- Premier League: 1st
- State Cup: 1st
- Toto Cup: 1st
- Champions League: Third qualifying round
- Europa League: Play-off round
- Top goalscorer: League: Eran Zahavi (27); All: Eran Zahavi (33)
Home colours	Away colours

== Current squad ==
=== first team ===
Note: Flags indicate national team as defined under FIFA eligibility rules; some limited exceptions apply. Players may hold more than one non-FIFA nationality.

No.	Pos.	Nation	Player
1	GK	ISR	Barak Levi
3	DF	ISR	Yuval Spungin
6	MF	ISR	Gal Alberman (1st VC)
7	MF	ISR	Eran Zahavi
9	MF	ISR	Maharan Radi
10	FW	ISR	Barak Yitzhaki
11	FW	ISR	Tal Ben Haim
14	DF	ISR	Yoav Ziv
15	MF	ISR	Dor Micha
16	MF	ISR	Ben Reichert
17	MF	ISR	Dan Einbinder
18	DF	ISR	Eitan Tibi
20	DF	ISR	Omri Ben Harush
21	DF	ISR	Sheran Yeini (Captain)
22	FW	SWE	Rade Prica

No.	Pos.	Nation	Player
23	FW	ISR	Barak Badash
24	MF	SRB	Nikola Mitrović
25	GK	ESP	Juan Pablo
27	DF	ISR	Guy Aviv
28	DF	ISR	Gil Vermouth
30	FW	ISR	Gael Margulies
31	DF	ESP	Carlos García
40	MF	NGR	Nosa Igiebor
41	GK	ISR	Sahar Hasson
42	MF	ISR	Dor Peretz
44	GK	ISR	Haviv Ohayon
91	MF	ISR	Moshe Lugasi
99	FW	ISR	Eden Ben Basat
—	MF	ISR	Dan Glazer

== Transfers ==
=== Summer ===
In:

No.	Pos.	Nation	Player
—	GK	ISR	Yossi Ginzburg (was on loan to (Israel) Sektzia Nes Tziona)
—	GK	ISR	Tomer Chencinski (was on loan to (Israel) Hakoah Amidar Ramat Gan)
—	DF	ISR	Yuval Spungin (from (Belgium) Mons)
—	DF	ISR	Reef Peretz (was on loan to (Israel) Hapoel Nir Ramat HaSharon)
—	DF	ISR	Yagil Biton (was on loan to (Israel) Hapoel Nir Ramat HaSharon)
—	MF	ISR	Ben Reichert (from (Israel) Hapoel Nir Ramat HaSharon)
—	MF	ISR	Moshe Lugasi (was on loan to (Israel) Beitar Jerusalem)
—	MF	ISR	Ruslan Berski (was on loan to (Israel) Maccabi Kabilio Jaffa)
—	MF	ISR	Hasan Abu Zaid (was on loan to (Cyprus) AEK Larnaca)
—	MF	NGR	Nosa Igiebor (from (Spain) Real Betis)
—	FW	ISR	Ben Ben Yair (was on loan to (Israel) Hapoel Nir Ramat HaSharon)
—	FW	NGR	Lanry Kahinda (was on loan to (Israel) Hakoah Amidar Ramat Gan)
—	FW	ISR	Eden Ben Basat (from (France) Toulouse)

Out:

No.	Pos.	Nation	Player
—	GK	ISR	Yossi Ginzburg (to (Israel) Hakoah Amidar Ramat Gan)
—	GK	ISR	Tomer Chencinski (to (Israel) Hapoel Nir Ramat HaSharon)
—	GK	ISR	Matan Amber (to (Israel) Hapoel Rishon LeZion)
—	DF	ISR	Yagil Biton (to (Israel) Maccabi Herzliya)
—	DF	ISR	Reef Peretz (on loan to (Israel) Hapoel Petah Tikva)
—	DF	FRA	Rémi Maréval (Free Agent)
—	MF	ISR	Ruslan Berski (to (Israel) Hapoel Jerusalem)
—	MF	ISR	Hasan Abu Zaid (on loan to (Israel) Maccabi Petah Tikva)
—	MF	SRB	Nikola Mitrović (Free Agent)
—	MF	ISR	Omri Altman (on loan to (Israel) Hapoel Petah Tikva)
—	MF	ISR	Daniel Gretz (on loan to (Israel) Maccabi Yavne)
—	FW	ISR	Ben Ben Yair (on loan to (Israel) Maccabi Petah Tikva)
—	FW	NGR	Lanry Kahinda (on loan to (Israel) Hapoel Afula)
—	FW	ISR	Dor Jan (on loan to (Israel) Hapoel Ironi Kiryat Shmona)
—	FW	ISR	Moshe Lugasi (on loan to (Israel) Maccapi Petah Tikva)

=== Winter ===
In:

No.	Pos.	Nation	Player
—	MF	ISR	Gil Vermouth (from (Israel) Hapoel Tel Aviv)

Out:

No.	Pos.	Nation	Player
—	FW	ISR	Ben Reichert (on loan to (Israel) Hapoel Tel Aviv)
—	DF	ISR	Sean Goldberg (on loan to (Israel) Hapoel Tel Aviv)

== Pre-season and friendlies ==
28 June 2014 Friendly	SC Weiz (Austria)	0 – 6	(Israel) Maccabi Tel Aviv	Sparkassen-Stadion, Austria
			E.Zahavi 22', 41'; Chibote 40'; R.Prica 51'; M.Radi 52'; G.Margulies 78'

1 July 2014 Friendly	SC Wiener Neustadt (Austria)	1 – 3	(Israel) Maccabi Tel Aviv	Fitental Stadium, Austria
	C.Deutschmann 75' (pen.)		N.Rukavytsya 5'; D.Einbinder 20'; M.Radi 71'; E.Zahavi (yellow card) 77' (yellow-red card)

7 July 2014 Friendly	SK Sturm Graz (Austria)	0 – 0	(Israel) Maccabi Tel Aviv	Gleisdorf Stadium, Austria

== UEFA Champions League ==
=== Second qualifying round ===
15 July 2014 Champions League	FC Santa Coloma (Andorra)	0 – 1	(Israel) Maccabi Tel Aviv	Andorra la Vella, Andorra
20:00			R.Prica 64'	Stadium: Estadi Comunal; Attendance: 494

22 July 2014 Champions League	Maccabi Tel Aviv (Israel)	2 – 0	(Andorra) FC Santa Coloma	Larnaca, Cyprus (Note: Due to the 2014 Gaza War, Maccabi Tel Aviv play their remaining home matches at a neutral venue)
19:30	Zahavi 62' (pen.); Ben Haim 90'			Stadium: Antonis Papadopoulos Stadium

- Order of legs reversed after original draw.
- Maccabi Tel Aviv won 3–0 on aggregate.

=== Third qualifying round ===
30 July 2014 Champions League	NK Maribor (Slovenia)	1 - 0	(Israel) Maccabi Tel Aviv	Maribor, Slovenia
	Bohar 94'			Stadium: Ljudski vrt

5 August 2014 Champions League	Maccabi Tel Aviv (Israel)	2 - 2	(Slovenia) NK Maribor	Larnaca, Cyprus
20:00	Ben Haim 42'; Ben Basat 54'		Ibraimi 36', 55'	Stadium: Antonis Papadopoulos Stadium; Attendance: 700

- Maccabi lost and entered the 2014–15 UEFA Europa League play-off round.

== UEFA Europa League ==
=== Play-off round ===
21 August 2014 Europa League	Asteras Tripolis (Greece)	2 - 0	(Israel) Maccabi Tel Aviv	Tripoli, Greece
21:15	Mazza 29'; Zisopoulos 47'; De Blasis (yellow card) 74'		Ben Basat (yellow card) 23'; García (yellow card) 69'; Igiebor (yellow card) 90'	Stadium: Theodoros Kolokotronis Stadium

28 August 2014 Europa League	Maccabi Tel Aviv (Israel)	3 - 1	(Greece) Asteras Tripolis	Larnaca, Cyprus
	Badash 27'; Tibi (yellow card) 31'; Zahavi 54' (pen.); Prica 75'		Goian 23'; Rolle (yellow card) 61'; Theodoropoulos (yellow card) 90'	Stadium: Antonis Papadopoulos Stadium; Attendance: 150

== Israeli Premier League ==
=== Regular season ===
Win Draw Loss

14 September 2014 1	Maccabi Tel Aviv	3 - 0	Maccabi Petah Tikva	Petah Tikva
20:15	Radi 14'; García (yellow card) 73'; Zahavi 74'; Prica 82'		Goldenberg (yellow card) 26'; Gerzicich (yellow card) 79'; Peretz (yellow card) 84'	Stadium: HaMoshava; Attendance: 3,614

21 September 2014 2	Maccabi Tel Aviv	2 - 0	Hapoel Ra'anana	Tel Aviv
20:15	Tal Ben Haim 76'; Zahavi 90'		Mbola (yellow card) 25'; Lavi (yellow card) 70'; Mbola (yellow card) 73' (yellow-red card)	Stadium: Bloomfield; Attendance: 11,141

29 September 2014 3	Maccabi Tel Aviv	2 - 3	Hapoel Be'er Sheva	Be'er Sheva
20:50	Ben Harush 21'; Zahavi (yellow card) 37' (goal) 56' (pen.); Ben Haim (yellow card) 73' (goal) 87'; Reichert (yellow card) 80'		Barda 3', 85', 88' (yellow card) 84'; Pajović (yellow card) 34'; Buzaglo (yellow card) 37'; Soares (yellow card) 91'	Stadium: Vasermil; Attendance: 11,000

20 October 2014 4	Maccabi Tel Aviv	3 - 1	Maccabi Haifa	Tel Aviv
20:50	Tal Ben Haim (yellow card) 17'; Tawatha 52' (o.g.); Zahavi 70'; Alberman (yellow card) 77'; Ben Basat 82'		Cocalić (yellow card) (yellow-red card) 2', 80'; Meshumar (red card) 23'; Rayos 59'; Michel (yellow card) 71'	Stadium: Bloomfield Stadium; Attendance: 13,682

26 October 2014 5	Maccabi Tel Aviv	4 - 1	Hapoel Acre	Acre
20:10	Zahavi 5' (pen.) 15'; Ben Harush (yellow card) 32' (goal) 41'; Badash 72'		Avidor (yellow card) 5'; Seiderre (yellow card) 51'; Salihi 92'	Stadium: Acre Municipal; Attendance: 6,132

29 October 2014 6	Maccabi Tel Aviv	5 - 2	F.C. Ashdod	Tel Aviv
20:00	Zahavi 18' 89'; Ben Harush 27'; Igiebor 34'; Ben Haim 52'		Kinda (yellow card) 54'; Rosh 72'; Bello 78'	Stadium: Bloomfield; Attendance: 11,322

3 November 2014 7	Maccabi Tel Aviv	0 - 0	Hapoel Tel Aviv	Tel Aviv
20:50				Stadium: Bloomfield; Attendance: Roy Riinsriibr
Note: Match suspended at first half time with the score 1-1. the result of the match was decided at 0-0 with no points.

8 November 2014 8	Maccabi Tel Aviv	3 - 1	Maccabi Netanya	Tel Aviv
	Igiebor (yellow card) 11'; Prica 28', 69'; Tibi 41'; Yeini (yellow card) 54'; Juan Pablo (red card)		kayode 16'; Levy (yellow card) 23'; Abu Abaid (yellow card) 76'	Stadium: Bloomfield; Attendance: 12,766

22 November 2014 9	Maccabi Tel Aviv	1 - 2	Ironi Kiryat Shmona	Kiryat Shmona
20:50	Zahavi (yellow card) 35' (goal) 90' (pen.); Igiebor (yellow card) 59'; Micha (yellow card) 69'		Kola 1'; Roi Kahat 81'; Tzedek (yellow card) 90'	Stadium: Kiryat Shmona

29 November 2014 10	Maccabi Tel Aviv	3 - 0	Hapoel Haifa	Tel Aviv
20:00	Zahavi 39', 61'; Ben Basat 74'; Peretz (yellow card) 86'		Roash (yellow card) 3'; Kovář (yellow card) 20'; Kijanskas (yellow card) 20'; Dajani (yellow card) 50'	Stadium: Netanya Stadium; Attendance: 9,896

2 December 2014 11	Maccabi Tel Aviv	3 - 1	Bnei Sakhnin	Acre
20:55	Ben Basat (yellow card) 19' (goal) 51'; Zahavi 40'; Yeini (yellow card) 74'; Badash 89'		Ghadir 5'; Abu Saleh (yellow card) 14'; Tambi (yellow card) 60'; Ottman (red card) 84'	Stadium: Acre Toto; Attendance: 3,500

6 December 2014 12	Maccabi Tel Aviv	1 - 1	Beitar Jerusalem	Haifa
20:55	Zahavi 61'		Malul (yellow card) 31'; Dasa (yellow card) 38'; Preda (yellow card) 41'; Atzili 90+4'	Stadium: Sammy Ofer; Attendance: 28,656

13 December 2014 13	Maccabi Tel Aviv	3 - 1	Hapoel Petah Tikva	Petah Tikva
17:30	Radi 26'; Zahavi 45', 79'		Hirsh 6'; Zhairi (yellow card) 19'	Stadium: HaMoshava Stadium; Attendance: 10,000

20 December 2014 14	Maccabi Tel Aviv	3 - 0	Maccabi Petah Tikva	Tel Aviv
20:30	Zahavi 29'; Ben Haim 46', 54'			Stadium: Bloomfield Stadium; Attendance: 8,732

27 December 2014 15	Maccabi Tel Aviv	2 - 0	Hapoel Ra'anana	Netanya
20:30	Ben Basat 10'; García 86'		Babayev (yellow card) 18'; Lipka (yellow card) 33'; Binyamin 76'	Stadium: Netanya

6 January 2015 16	Maccabi Tel Aviv	0 - 0	Hapoel Be'er Sheva	Tel Aviv
20:55	Igiebor (yellow card) 25'; Zahavi (yellow card) 40'; Tibi (yellow card) 87'		Barda (yellow card) 63'; Hoban (yellow card) 72'; Ben Bitton (yellow card) 77'; Davidzada (red card) 90'	Stadium: Bloomfield Stadium; Attendance: 13,728

11 January 2015 17	Maccabi Tel Aviv	1 - 0	Maccabi Haifa	Haifa
20:55	Ben Harush (yellow card) 8'; Mitrović (yellow card) 41'; Zahavi 77' (pen.)		Keinan (red card) 28'; Cocalić (red card) 77'; Meshumar (yellow card) 44'	Stadium: Sammy Ofer Stadium; Attendance: 28,988

17 January 2015 18	Maccabi Tel Aviv	3 - 0	Hapoel Acre	Tel Aviv
20:00	Zahavi 2' (pen.); Ben Haim 25' (yellow card) 50'; Ben Basat 35' (pen.)		Jovanović (yellow card) 1'	Stadium: Bloomfield; Attendance: 11,652

24 January 2015 19	Maccabi Tel Aviv	1 - 0	F.C. Ashdod	Ashdod
17:30	Einbinder (yellow card) 7'; Mitrović 39'; Igiebor (yellow card) 58'; Juan Pablo (yellow card) 90+3'		Bello (yellow card) 18'; Abu Anza (yellow card) 41'; Kinda (yellow card) 55'; Pety (yellow card) 82'	Stadium: Yud-Alef; Attendance: 2,400

2 February 2015 20	Maccabi Tel Aviv	2 - 0	Hapoel Tel Aviv	Tel Aviv
	Radi 10'; Mitrović (yellow card) 52'; Ben Haim (yellow card) 60'		Falah (yellow card) 14'; Yehezkel (yellow card) 48'; Zaguri (yellow card) 87'; Ohayon (yellow card) 89'	Stadium: Bloomfield; Attendance: 13,500

8 February 2015 21	Maccabi Tel Aviv	3 - 3	Maccabi Netanya	Netanya
	Ziv (yellow card) 13'; Micha 20'; Alberman (yellow card) 29'; Peretz (yellow card) 39'; Ben Basat 50' (yellow card) 82'; Zahavi 77'; García (yellow card) 89'		Kayode 15', 42'; Giurgiu (yellow card) 43'; Shitrit (yellow card) 62'; Abi Abiad (yellow card) 63'; Saba 79'	Stadium: Netanya

17 February 2015 22	Maccabi Tel Aviv	1 - 1	Ironi Kiryat Shmona	Kiryat Shmona
	Badash 85'		Brown 10'; Haimov (yellow card) 35'; Abed (yellow card) 76'	Stadium: Bloomfield; Attendance: 13,710

21 February 2015 23	Maccabi Tel Aviv	0 - 2	Hapoel Haifa	Haifa
	Ben Harush (yellow card) 55'; Mitrović (yellow card) 90+3' (red card)		Lala 35'; Shabtay (yellow card) 59'; Kijanskas 85'	Stadium: Sammy Ofer; Attendance: 5,230

28 February 2015 24	Maccabi Tel Aviv	2 - 0	Bnei Sakhnin	Tel Aviv
19:20	Zahavi 45+2'; Micha 83'; Ziv (yellow card) 90+3'		Kachuba (yellow card) 24'; Ghadir (yellow card) 38'; Jovanović (yellow card) 45'	Stadium: Bloomfield; Attendance: 10,893

9 March 2015 25	Maccabi Tel Aviv	0 - 1	Beitar Jerusalem	Haifa
20:55	García (yellow card) 60'		Atzili 44' (yellow card) 72'	Stadium: Sammy Ofer; Attendance: 16,500

16 March 2015 26	Maccabi Tel Aviv	2 - 0	Hapoel Petah Tikva	Tel Aviv
20:55	Zahavi 11'; Micha 19'; Alberman (yellow card) 34'; Ben Harush (yellow card) 54'		Musa (yellow card) 35'; Peso (yellow card) 59'	Stadium: Bloomfield; Attendance: 10,853

=== Championship Round ===
22 March 2015 27	Maccabi Tel Aviv	2 - 1	Maccabi Haifa	Tel Aviv
20:35	Igiebor 1'; Yeini (yellow card) 72'; García (yellow card) 80'; Zahavi 89'		Atar 67'; Yadin (yellow card) 88'	Stadium: Bloomfield; Attendance: 12,876

6 April 2015 28	Maccabi Tel Aviv	3 - 1	Hapoel Be'er Sheva	Tel Aviv
20:55	Zahavi 3', 83'; Micha (yellow card) 28'; García (yellow card) 39'; Ben Haim 79'		Ogu (yellow card) 18'; Buzaglo 47'; Soares (yellow card) 88'; Nassar (red card)	Stadium: Bloomfield; Attendance: 13,732

13 April 2015 29	Maccabi Tel Aviv	0 - 0	Ironi Kiryat Shmona	Kiryat Shmona
20:55	Ben Basat (yellow card) 17'; Mitrović (yellow card) 60'; Ben Haim (yellow card) 80'; Sheran Yeini (yellow card) 89'		Abuhatzira (yellow card) 8'; Rochet (yellow card) 80'; Kahat (yellow card) 88'	Stadium: Bloomfield

19 April 2015 30	Maccabi Tel Aviv	4 - 1	Beitar Jerusalem	Tel Aviv
20:15	Micha 56', 72'; Prica 68' (yellow card) 90'; Zahavi 82'		Cohen 58'; Malul (red card) 80'	Stadium: Bloomfield; Attendance: 12,536

25 April 2015 31	Maccabi Tel Aviv	1 - 1	Maccabi Petah Tikva	Petah Tikva
20:15	Ben Harush (yellow card) 19' (red card) 35'; Zahavi 40' (pen.); Ben Haim (yellow card) 54'; Alberman (yellow card) 78'; Peretz (yellow card) 90+1'		Herceg (yellow card) 7'; Elo (yellow card) 39'; Kabha (yellow card) 57'; Peser (yellow card) 79'	Stadium: Hamoshava

4 May 2015 32	Maccabi Tel Aviv	1 - 1	Maccabi Haifa	Haifa
20:55	Zahavi 12' (yellow card) 34'; García (yellow card) 41'; Alberman 43'; Ziv (yellow card) 90'		Rayos 35'; Tawatha (yellow card) 38'	Stadium: Sammy Ofer

11 May 2015 33	Maccabi Tel Aviv	1 - 1	Hapoel Be'er Sheva	Be'er Sheva
	Igiebor 26' (yellow card) 32'; Mitrović (yellow card) 70'; Peretz (yellow card) 78'		Bitton (yellow card) 53'; Hoban 67'	Stadium: Vasermil; Attendance: 9,000

17 May 2015 34	Maccabi Tel Aviv	3 - 1	Ironi Kiryat Shmona	Tel Aviv
	Igiebor (yellow card) 6'; Prica (yellow card) 31' (goal) 44'; Micha (yellow card) 36'; Radi 64'		Kahat 11' (yellow card) 32'; Tzedek (yellow card) 31'; Azam (yellow card) 81'	Stadium: Bloomfield

25 May 2015 35	Maccabi Tel Aviv	0 - 3	Beitar Jerusalem	Jerusalem
20:55	Zahavi (yellow card) 21'		L. Cohen 4'; Maman 36'; I. Cohen 89'	Stadium: Teddy

1 June 2015 36	Maccabi Tel Aviv	0 - 2	Maccabi Petah Tikva	Tel Aviv
20:55	Alberman (yellow card) 45'; Mitrović (yellow card) 56'; Prica (yellow card) 60'		Kanyuk 16'; Munugal (yellow card) 31'; Rotman 90'	Stadium: Bloomfield

== Israel State Cup ==
14 January 2015 Eighth round	Maccabi Tel Aviv	4 - 1	Beitar Tel Aviv Ramla	Ramla
21:00	Yitzhaki 3', 52'; Reichert (yellow card) 14' (goal) 73'; Badash 29'		Avinu 25' (pen.); Luiza (yellow card) 32'; Etou (yellow card) 41'	Stadium: Ramla; Attendance: 2,000

27 January 2015 Round of 16	Maccabi Tel Aviv	1 - 0	Hapoel Ashkelon	Tel Aviv
21:00	Prertz (yellow card) 71'; Itzhaki 84'; Goldberg (yellow card) 87'		Buzaglo (yellow card) 83'	Stadium: Bloomfield; Attendance: 9,915

25 February 2015 Quarter final first leg	Maccabi Tel Aviv	1 - 1	Ironi Kiryat Shmona	Kiryat Shmona
19:30	Zahavi 44'; Radi (yellow card) 50'; Ben Harush (yellow card) 79'		Abuhatzira 90+2'	Stadium: Kiryat Shmona

4 March 2015 Quarter final Second leg	Maccabi Tel Aviv	3 - 0	Ironi Kiryat Shmona	Tel Aviv
20:30	Badash 26' (yellow card) 26'; Tibi (yellow card) 28'; Zahavi 30', 69' (pen.)		Azam (yellow card) 22'; Haimov (yellow card) 68'	Stadium: Bloomfield; Attendance: 12,750

29 April 2015 Semi final	Maccabi Tel Aviv	3 - 0	Maccabi Ahi Nazareth	Jerusalem
20:40	Zahavi 2'; Prica 82'; Mitrović 89'		Lipenia (yellow card) 47'; Avitan (yellow card) 65'	Stadium: Teddy

20 May 2015 Final	Maccabi Tel Aviv	6 - 2	Hapoel Be'er Sheva	Haifa
20:30	Ben Harush (yellow card) 20'; Prica 21', 47', 52'; Ziv 28'; Alberman (yellow card) 29'; Zahavi 58'; Radi 62'		Hoban (yellow card) 32' (goal) 34'; Buzaglo 57' (red card) 90'	Stadium: Sammy Ofer; Attendance: 30,000

== Toto cup ==
Pos	Team	Pld	W	D	L	GF	GA	GD	Pts	MTA	HTA	HRA	MNE
1	Maccabi Tel Aviv (A)	3	2	1	0	3	0	+3	7			2–0	
2	Hapoel Tel Aviv (A)	3	1	1	1	2	1	+1	4	1–0		0–0	
3	Hapoel Ra'anana	3	1	1	1	1	2	−1	4				1–0
4	Maccabi Netanya	3	0	1	2	0	3	−3	1	0–0	0–2		

Source: football.org.il (in Hebrew)
Legend: Blue = home team win; Yellow = draw; Red = away team win.
Rules for classification: 1st points; 2nd goal difference; 3rd matches won; 4th goals scored; 5th head-to-head; 6th decision match
(A) Advanced to the quarterfinals

=== Group stage ===
12 August 2014 1	Maccabi Tel Aviv	0 - 0	Maccabi Netanya	Netanya
20:50	Ben Haim (yellow card) 57'	Summary	Kende (yellow card) 36'; Levy (yellow card) 37'; Kayode (yellow card) 56'	Stadium: Netanya; Referee: (Israel) Orel Grinfeeld

16 August 2014 2	Maccabi Tel Aviv	2 - 0	Hapoel Ra'anana	Petah Tikva
20:30	Badash 23' 67'; Igiebor (yellow card) 39'; Ziv (yellow card) 73'		Lavi (yellow card) 26'	Stadium: HaMoshava Stadium; Attendance: 6,023; Referee: (Israel) Roey Riinsriibr

September 2014 3	Maccabi Tel Aviv	1 - 0	Hapoel Tel Aviv	Tel Aviv
20:30	García (yellow card) 26'; Radi (yellow card) 42'; Bem Haim 55'; Ziv (yellow card) 56'; Zahavi (yellow card) 67'; Ben Haim (yellow card) 69'; Lugasi (yellow card) 80'		Malka (yellow card) 59'; Amos (red card) 55'; Yehezkel (yellow card) 90'	Stadium: Bloomfield; Attendance: 12,008; Referee: Liani

=== Quarter-final ===
10 September 2014 First Leg	Hapoel Petah Tikva	0 - 6	Maccabi Tel Aviv	Tel Aviv
20:15	Elkaslasy (yellow card) 36'; Cohen (yellow card) 58'; Peso (yellow card) 64'		Margulies 5'; Tibi 18'; Ben Harush 22'; Zahavi 24' (yellow card) 36'; Mitrović (yellow card) 46'; Ben Basat 51' (pen.); Peretz 63'	Stadium: Bloomfield; Attendance: 8,242

17 September 2014 Second Leg	Maccabi Tel Aviv	2 - 0	Hapoel Petah Tikva	Petah Tikva
19:45	Ben Harush 23'; Reichert 48'			Stadium: HaMoshava

=== Semi-final ===
17 December 2014 Semi-final	Maccabi Tel Aviv	1 - 0	Hapoel Haifa	Petah Tikva
21:00	Tal Ben Haim 12'		Serdal 88'	Stadium: HaMoshava; Attendance: 2,580

=== Final ===
31 December 2014 final	Maccabi Tel Aviv	2 - 1	Maccabi Haifa	Netanya
19:45	Ziv (yellow card) 37'; Ohayon 41' (o.g.); Mitrović (yellow card) 73' (goal) 82' (pen.); Einbinder (yellow card) 90'		Ohayon (yellow card) 47'; Tibi 47' (o.g.); Keinan (yellow card) 80'	Stadium: Netanya; Attendance: 12,427
