= 2015 Israel State Cup final =

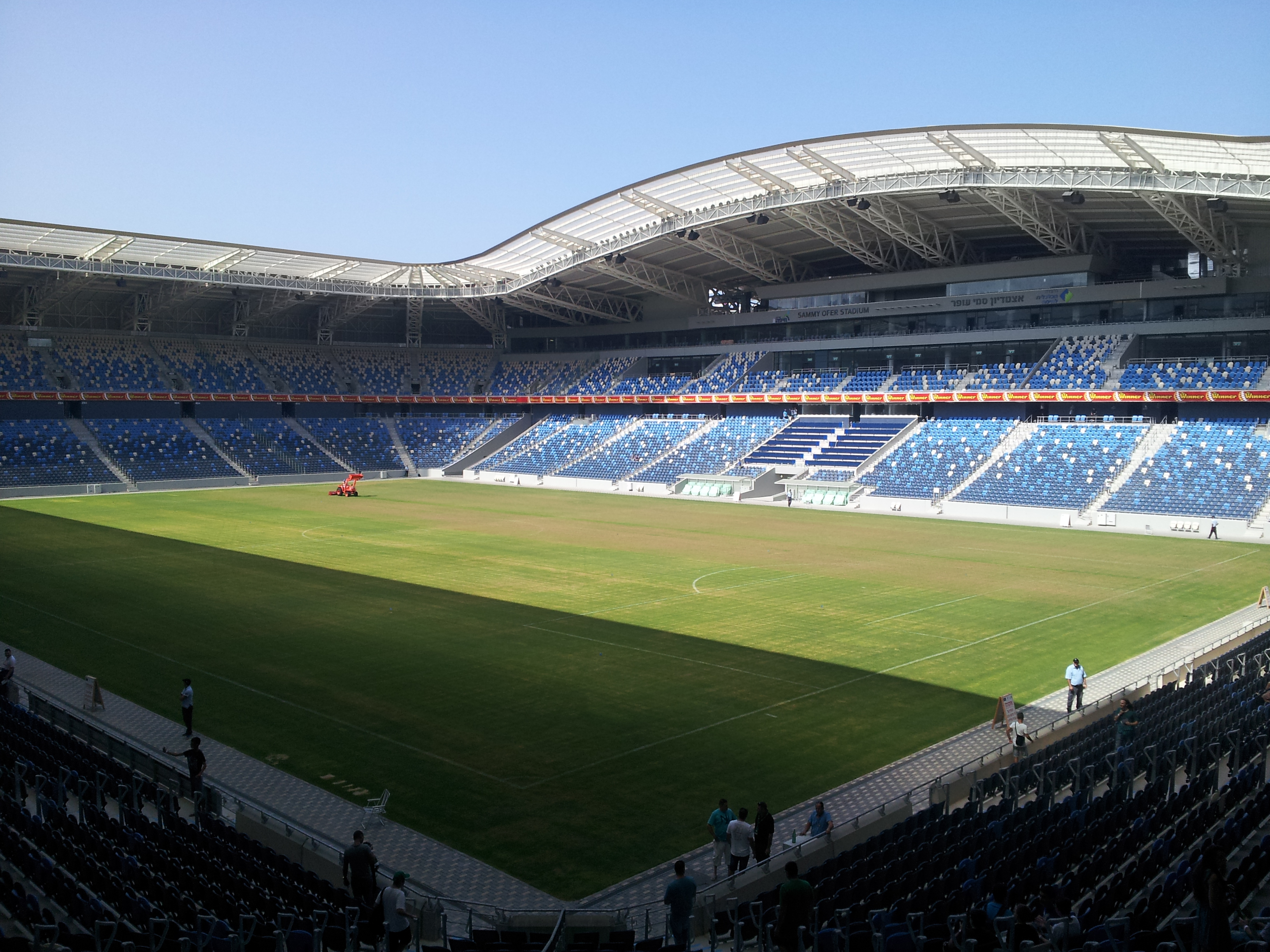
- Sammy Ofer Stadium in Haifa hosted the final
- Event: 2014–15 Israel State Cup
| Maccabi Tel Aviv | Hapoel Be'er Sheva |
| 6 | 2 |
- Date: 20 May 2015
- Venue: Sammy Ofer, Haifa
- Referee: Ziv Adler
- Attendance: 30,000

The 2015 Israel State Cup final decided the winner of the 2014–15 Israel State Cup, the 80th season of Israel's main football cup. It was played 20 May 2015 at the Sammy Ofer Stadium in Haifa, between Maccabi Tel Aviv and Hapoel Be'er Sheva.

== Background ==
Maccabi Tel Aviv were in their 34th final, having already won 22. Their most recent final was in 2005, winning 1–0 against Maccabi Hertzliya, and their last loss was in 1997 to Hapoel Be'er Sheva. It was Hapoel Be'er Sheva's fourth final, Their most recent appearance in the final was in 2003, in which they lost on penalties against Hapoel Ramat Gan.

== Road to the final ==
| Maccabi Tel Aviv | | Round | Hapoel Be'er Sheva |
|---|---|---|---|---|
| Opponent | Result | 2014–15 Israel State Cup | Opponent | Result |
| Beitar Tel Aviv Ramla | 4–1 | Eighth round | Maccabi Herzliya | 1–0 |
| Hapoel Ashkelon | 1–0 | Round of 16 | Hapoel Ra'anana | 1-0 |
| Ironi Kiryat Shmona | 1–1 | Quarter-finals first leg | Maccabi Yavne | 3–0 |
| Ironi Kiryat Shmona | 3–0 | Quarter-finals second leg | Maccabi Yavne | 1–1 |
| Maccabi Ahi Nazareth | 3–0 | Semi-finals | Hapoel Afula | 7–0 |

=== Details ===
20 May 2015
20:30 CEST

| Maccabi Tel Aviv | 6–2 | Hapoel Be'er Sheva |

Sammy Ofer Stadium, Haifa
Attendance: 30,000
Referee: Ziv Adler

| Maccabi Tel Aviv | Hapoel Be'er Sheva |

| GK | 25 | (Spain) Juan Pablo Colinas |
| RB | 3 | (Israel) Yuval Spungin |
| CB | 6 | (Israel) Gal Alberman (c) (yellow card) 29' |
| CB | 24 | (Serbia) Nikola Mitrović |
| LB | 14 | (Israel) Yoav Ziv 28' |
| DM | 15 | (Israel) Dor Micha (substituted off) 81' |
| CM | 17 | (Israel) Dan Einbinder |
| CM | 20 | (Israel) Omri Ben Harush (yellow card) 20' |
| RW | 7 | (Israel) Eran Zahavi 58' (substituted off) 86' |
| LW | 9 | (Israel) Maharan Radi 62' |
| CF | 22 | (Sweden) Rade Prica (substituted off) 73' (goal) 21', 47', 52' |
Substitutes:
| GK | 1 | (Israel) Barak Levi |
| DF | 28 | (Israel) Gil Vermouth |
| MF | 11 | (Israel) Tal Ben Haim (substituted on) 81' |
| MF | 30 | (Israel) Gael Margulies |
| MF | 10 | (Israel) Barak Itzhaki (substituted on) 86' |
| FW | 23 | (Israel) Barak Badash (substituted on) 73' |
| FW | 99 | (Israel) Eden Ben Basat |
Manager:
(Spain) Pako Ayestarán

| GK | 1 | (Nigeria) Austin Ejide |
| RB | 2 | (Israel) Ben Bitton |
| CB | 12 | (Brazil) William Ribeiro Soares |
| CB | 13 | (Israel) Ofir Davidzada |
| LB | 23 | (Serbia) Tomislav Pajović (substituted off) 34' |
| DM | 12 | (Romania) Ovidiu Hoban (yellow card) 32' (goal) 34' |
| CM | 30 | (Nigeria) Jhon Ogu |
| CM | 16 | (Israel) Dovev Gabay |
| RW | 11 | (Israel) Maor Buzaglo 57' (red card) 90' |
| LW | 18 | (Israel) Shlomi Arbeitman (substituted off) 65' |
| CF | 10 | (Israel) Elyaniv Barda (c) (substituted off) 55' |
Substitutes:
| GK | 22 | (Israel) Robi Levkovich |
| DF | 4 | (Israel) Dor Malul |
| DF | 7 | (Israel) Siraj Nassar (substituted on) 65' |
| MF | 14 | (Israel) Evyatar Iluz |
| MF | 15 | (Israel) Roei Gordana (substituted on) 34' |
| FW | 20 | (Israel) Loai Taha |
| FW | 24 | (Israel) Maor Melikson (substituted on) 55' |
Manager:
(Israel) Elisha Levi
