= Nosa Igiebor =

Nigerian footballer

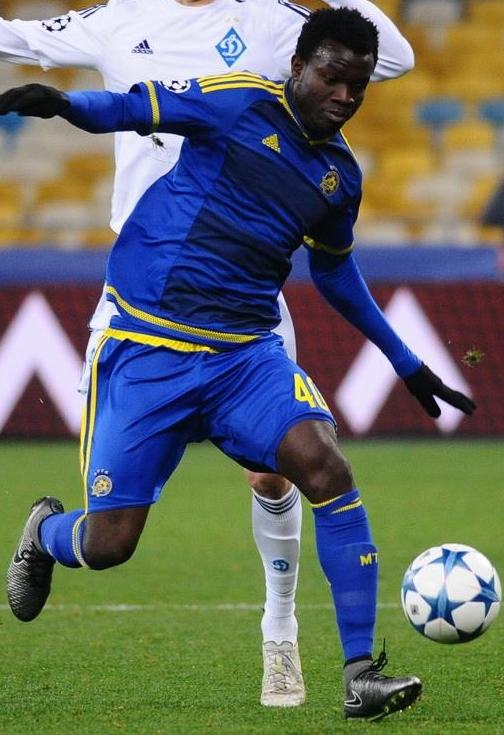
- Igiebor playing for Maccabi Tel Aviv, 2015

Personal information
- Full name: Emmanuel Nosakhare Igiebor
- Date of birth: 9 November 1990 (age 36)
- Place of birth: Abuja, Nigeria
- Height: 1.82 m (6 ft 0 in)
- Position: Midfielder

Youth career
- 1999–2005: Sharks

Senior career*
Years	Team	Apps	(Gls)
2005–2007	Sharks	49	(7)
2007–2009	Warri Wolves	63	(16)
2009–2011	Lillestrøm	67	(13)
2011–2012	Hapoel Tel Aviv	27	(3)
2012–2014	Real Betis	26	(2)
2014–2017	Maccabi Tel Aviv	64	(9)
2017	Çaykur Rizespor	13	(1)
2017	Vancouver Whitecaps FC	1	(0)
2018–2019	Anorthosis Famagusta	20	(1)

International career
2011–2014	Nigeria	14	(2)
Medal record
Men's football
Representing Nigeria
Africa Cup of Nations
Winner	2013 South Africa
- * Club domestic league appearances and goals

Emmanuel Nosakhare Igiebor MON (born 9 November 1990), commonly known as Nosa Igiebor or Nosa, is a Nigerian former professional footballer who plays as a midfielder. He was called up to Nigeria's 23-man squad for the 2013 Africa Cup of Nations.

== Club career ==
After appearing in his homeland with Sharks and Warri Wolves, Nosa joined Tippeligaen side Lillestrøm in 2009. He held a starting spot during his time in Norway, being an important offensive unit in the 2011 campaign, netting eight times in 17 matches.

On 8 August 2011, Nosa signed for Hapoel Tel Aviv, for transfer fee of 8 million krones. On 18 August 2011, he made his debut in Hapoel during the UEFA Europa League Playoffs against FK Ekranas. Four days later he scored his first goal for Hapoel against Maccabi Petah-Tikva. On 14 May 2012, Nosa scored the winning goal in the Israeli cup final in a 2–1 victory over Maccabi Haifa.

On 24 August 2012, Nosa moved to Spain for a transfer fee of €1.2 million, signing a four-year deal with Real Betis. On 12 April 2013, he scored his first goal in Betis against Sevilla FC after coming on as a substitute in the 89th minute. He finished his two seasons in Betis with 2 goals in 28 appearances.

On 22 July 2014, Nosa joined Maccabi Tel-Aviv. On 30 July 2014, he made his debut in Maccabi in a 1–0 loss to Maribor during the Champions League Qualifiers.

On 8 September 2017, Vancouver Whitecaps FC announced that Nosa had been signed for the remainder of the 2017 season, with club options for 2018 and 2019.

== Honours ==
Hapoel Tel Aviv

- Israel State Cup: 2011–12

Maccabi Tel Aviv

- Israeli Premier League: 2014–15
- Israel State Cup: 2014–15
- Toto Cup: 2014–15

Orders

- Member of the Order of the Niger
