= Yuval Spungin =

Israeli footballer

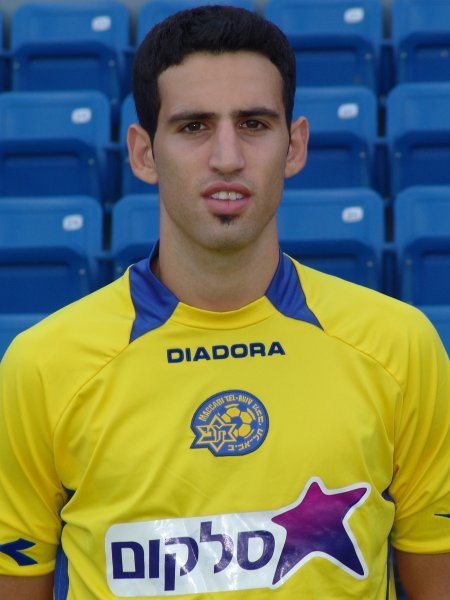
- Spungin with Maccabi Tel Aviv

Personal information
- Full name: Yuval Spungin
- Date of birth: 3 April 1987 (age 39)
- Place of birth: Ramat Gan, Israel
- Height: 1.78 m (5 ft 10 in)
- Position: Right back

Team information
- Current team: Hapoel Kfar Shalem

Youth career
- Maccabi Tel Aviv

Senior career*
Years	Team	Apps	(Gls)
2004–2010	Maccabi Tel Aviv	125	(2)
2010–2013	AC Omonia	72	(1)
2013–2014	RAEC Mons	17	(0)
2014–2018	Maccabi Tel Aviv	40	(0)
2018–2019	Ironi Kiryat Shmona	7	(0)
2019	Ashdod	10	(0)
2019	Hapoel Marmorek	12	(0)
2019–2021	Hapoel Kfar Shalem	29	(0)

International career^{‡}
2003–2004	Israel U-17	13	(0)
2005	Israel U-18	7	(0)
2004–2006	Israel U-19	21	(1)
2006–2008	Israel U-21	15	(0)
2007–2014	Israel	27	(0)
- * Club domestic league appearances and goals as of 1 January 2020 (UTC) ‡ National team caps and goals as of 25 June 2015

Yuval Spungin (or Yuval Shpungin, Hebrew: יובל שפונגין; born 3 April 1987) is an Israeli footballer who plays for Hapoel Kfar Shalem. He has played for the Israel national under-17 football team, the Israel national under-18 football team, the Israel national under-19 football team, the Israel national under-21 football team, and the Israel national football team. He won a gold medal with Team Israel in the 2005 Maccabiah Games. He has also played for Maccabi Tel Aviv, AC Omonia, RAEC Mons, Ironi Kiryat Shmona, F.C. Ashdod, and Hapoel Marmorek.

Spungin was born in Ramat Gan, Israel. Spungin's family are of Estonian extraction and he holds an Estonian passport.

== Club career ==
Spungin won a gold medal with Team Israel, alongside Itay Shechter, in the 2005 Maccabiah Games.

In January 2010, Spungin signed a three-year contract with AC Omonia, starting from June 2010.
In July 2013, Spungin signed a two-year contract with R.A.E.C. Mons.

In the summer of 2014, Spungin returned to Israel and signed with Maccabi Tel Aviv. At the beginning of 2014–15 season he played few games before suffering from injuries. On May 17, 2015, he returned to play after 8 months in the championship match against Ironi Kiryat Shmona F.C. which Maccabi won 2–1. On May 22, 2018 Maccabi Tel Aviv released Spungin after he finished his contract.

On May 24, 2018, Spungin signed to Israeli Premier League club Ironi Kiryat Shmona.

On 10 July 2019 Spungin signed the Liga Alef club Hapoel Marmorek.

== National career ==
On 7 March 2007 he made his debut in the Israel National team in a friendly game against Ukraine.
On 24 March 2007 was his first appearance in an official international game against England.

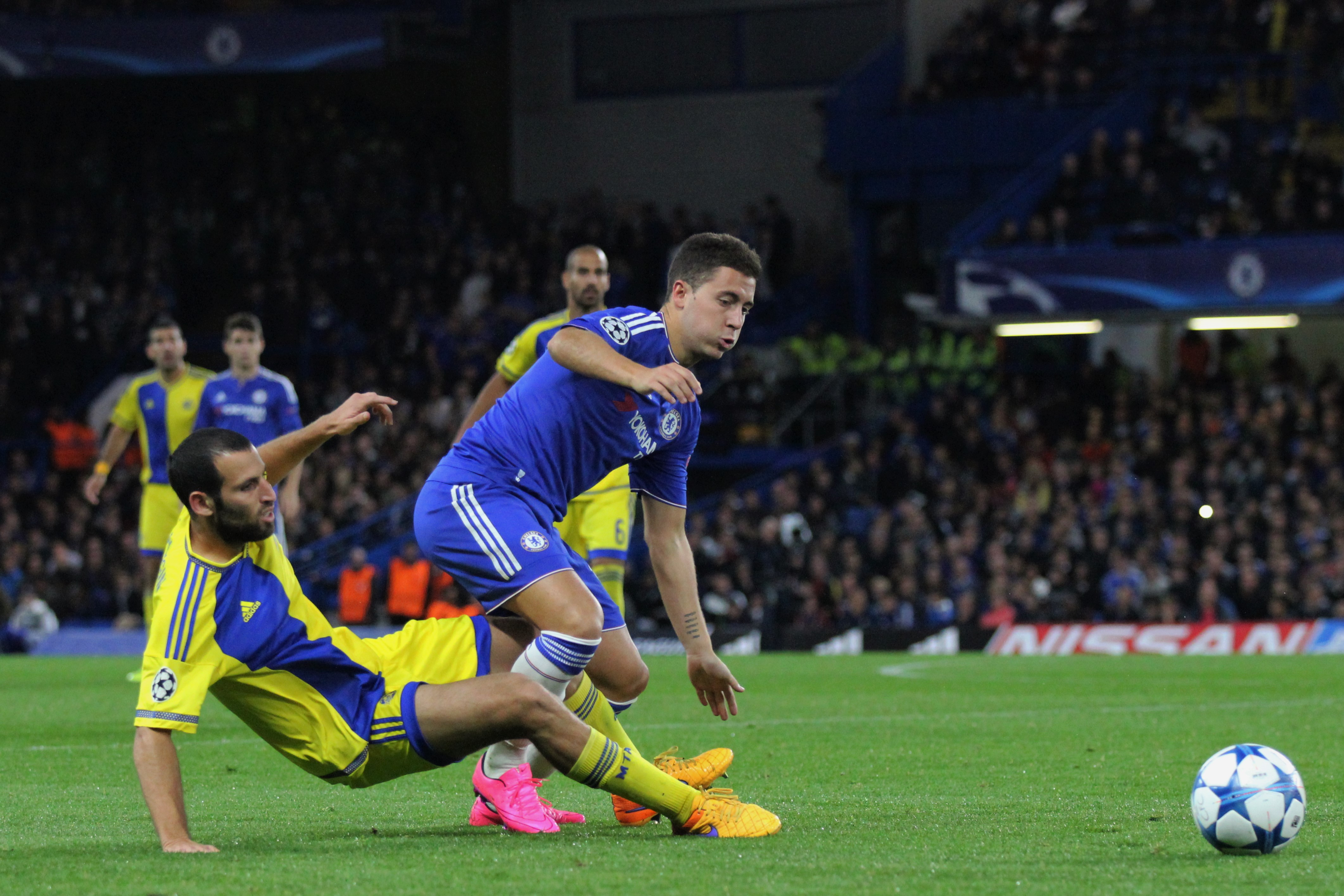
Spungin (on Left) in 2015–16 UEFA Champions League group stage agens Eden Hazard.

== Career statistics ==
Club performance			League		Cup		League Cup		Continental		Total	
Season	Club	League	Apps	Goals	Apps	Goals	Apps	Goals	Apps	Goals	Apps	Goals
Israel			League		Israel State Cup		Toto Cup		Europe		Total	
2004–05	Maccabi Tel Aviv	Liga Al	2	0	0	0	0	0	0	0	2	0
2005–06	Maccabi Tel Aviv	Liga Al	22	1	0	0	7	0	2	0	31	1
2006–07	Maccabi Tel Aviv	Liga Al	29	1	2	0	5	0	0	0	36	1
2007–08	Maccabi Tel Aviv	Liga Al	28	0	1	0	3	0	4	0	36	0
2008–09	Maccabi Tel Aviv	Liga Al	22	0	1	0	6	0	0	0	29	0
2008–09	Maccabi Tel Aviv	Liga Al	22	0	2	0	5	0	0	0	29	0
Cyprus			League		Cypriot Cup		League Cup		Europe		Total	
2010–11	AC Omonia	1st Division	18	1	5	1	0	0	6	0	29	2
2011–12	AC Omonia	1st Division	28	0	6	0	0	0	4	0	38	0
2012–13	AC Omonia	1st Division	26	0	4	0	0	0	2	0	32	0
Belgium			League		Belgian Cup		League Cup		Europe		Total	
2013–14	R.A.E.C. Mons	Belgium	17	0	0	0	–		–		17	0
Israel			League		Israel State Cup		Toto Cup		Europe		Total	
2014–15	Maccabi Tel Aviv	Liga Al	3	0	1	0	3	0	3	0	10	0
2015–16	Maccabi Tel Aviv	Liga Al	11	0	0	0	3	0	6	0	20	0
Career total			197	3	21	0	26	0	18	0	261	3

== Honours ==
=== Club ===
Maccabi Tel Aviv

- Israeli Premier League: 2014–15
- Israel State Cup: 2014–15
- Toto Cup: 2008–09, 2014–15, 2017–18

AC Omonia

- Cypriot Cup: 2011, 2012
- Cyprus FA Shield: 2010, 2012
