= Bendayan =

Bendayan is a surname. Notable people with the surname include:

- Alegría Bendayán de Bendelac (1928–2020), Venezuelan philologist, professor, writer and Jewish poet
- Amador Bendayán (1920–1989), Venezuelan actor and entertainer of Moroccan Jewish descent
- Ali Ben Dayan, sometimes Ali Bendayan (born 1943), Moroccan footballer
- Dedi Ben Dayan (born 1978), Israeli footballer
- Rachel Bendayan (born 1979), Canadian Member of Parliament

== See also ==
- Ben Dayan
