= Pako Ayestarán =

Spanish football manager (born 1963)

Personal information
- Full name: Francisco Martín Ayestarán Barandiarán
- Date of birth: 5 February 1963 (age 63)
- Place of birth: Beasain, Spain
- Height: 1.78 m (5 ft 10 in)
- Position: Centre-back

Youth career
- Years: Team
- Real Sociedad

Managerial career
- 2001–2004: Valencia (assistant)
- 2004–2007: Liverpool (assistant)
- 2008–2009: Benfica (assistant)
- 2009–2010: Valencia (assistant)
- 2011–2012: Al-Ahli Dubai (assistant)
- 2013–2014: Tecos
- 2014–2015: Maccabi Tel Aviv
- 2015: Santos Laguna
- 2016: Valencia
- 2017: Las Palmas
- 2018–2019: Pachuca
- 2020–2022: Tondela
- 2022–2026: Aston Villa (assistant)

Francisco Martín "Pako" Ayestarán Barandiarán (born 5 February 1963) is a Spanish football manager and coach. He was most recently the assistant head coach at Premier League club Aston Villa.

Ayestarán was assistant manager to Rafael Benítez at Valencia and Liverpool. After parting ways with Benítez in 2007, he became a head coach in his own right, managing clubs in Mexico, Israel, Spain, and Portugal. He led Maccabi Tel Aviv to a domestic treble in 2015.

== Coaching career ==
=== Early career ===
Ayestarán was born in Beasain, Gipuzkoa. After starting his career as a fitness coach, he was appointed Rafael Benítez's assistant at Osasuna, and remained behind the manager at Extremadura, Tenerife, Valencia and Liverpool.

=== Valencia ===
In 2001, Ayestarán followed Rafael Benítez to Valencia, joining as assistant manager. The club won two La Liga titles (2001–02 and 2003–04) and the 2003–04 UEFA Cup.

=== Liverpool ===
In 2004, he moved to Liverpool as assistant manager. There, Ayestarán modernized the team's fitness regime, introducing data-driven methods, individualized recovery programs, and the "Pako Hills" training slopes at Melwood. Steven Gerrard called him "the perfect number two," while Peter Crouch remarked "Pako ran the show," crediting him as one of the best coaches he had worked with. During his time at the club, Benítez won the 2004–05 UEFA Champions League, 2005 UEFA Super Cup, 2005–06 FA Cup, 2006 FA Community Shield, and a runner-up finish in the 2006–07 UEFA Champions League.

On 1 September 2007, Ayestarán announced his departure from the Reds after eleven years of partnering with Benítez. Benítez accused Ayestarán of "betrayal" as Ayestarán "contacted other clubs behind his back", while Ayestarán rejected the accusations, claiming instead that Benítez "forgot his principles".

During the summer of 2007, Barcelona expressed interest in adding him to their technical staff, though Liverpool initially blocked the move. He was also invited by Avram Grant to join his coaching staff at Chelsea, but Ayestarán declined the offer.

=== Real Sociedad ===
After leaving Liverpool, Ayestarán was briefly appointed sporting director of Real Sociedad in January 2008, but resigned after a few weeks due to conflict with club president Iñaki Badiola.

=== Benfica and return to Valencia ===
In the 2008–09 season, he served as fitness coach under Quique Sánchez Flores at Benfica in Portugal, where the club won the Taça da Liga. He returned to Valencia for the 2009–10 season as fitness coach under Unai Emery. Ayestarán left the club in June 2010, stating that he wanted to pursue other professional opportunities.

After a year out, he joined Sánchez Flores again for the 2011–12 season at Al-Ahli Dubai, where they won the UAE League Cup.

=== Estudiantes Tecos ===
On 24 August 2013, Ayestarán took his first head coaching role at Estudiantes Tecos in Mexico. In May 2014, Tecos won the Clausura 2014 title under his management, defeating Correcaminos UAT on penalties. They went on to lose the promotion play-off to Leones Negros, and the franchise was later relocated to Zacatecas. Ayestarán chose not to continue with the team, stating he had no intention of remaining in the second division.

=== Maccabi Tel Aviv ===
Ayestarán was appointed Maccabi Tel Aviv manager on 26 August 2014, replacing fellow Spaniard Óscar García, who had resigned due to the war in Gaza. During the 2014–15 season, Ayestarán led Maccabi Tel Aviv to a domestic treble—winning the Israeli Premier League, the Israel State Cup, and the Toto Cup after defeating Maccabi Haifa 2–1 in the final—becoming the first manager to win all three major domestic trophies in a single season in Israel.

Ayestarán resigned from the club on 20 August 2015. He was later linked with a return to Liverpool as assistant to Brendan Rodgers, but made clear he intended to continue as a head coach.

=== Santos Laguna ===
On 19 August 2015, Ayestarán returned to Mexico, being appointed at the helm of Santos Laguna in Liga MX, replacing Portuguese coach Pedro Caixinha, who had resigned days earlier. The side averaged 1.36 points per match across all competitions. On 21 November 2015, Ayestarán chose not to continue with the club for the Clausura 2016 tournament.

=== Return to Valencia (2016) ===
On 14 February 2016, Ayestarán returned to Valencia for a third spell, though for the first time not as a fitness coach but as a member of Gary Neville's coaching staff.

On 31 March 2016, following Neville's dismissal, Ayestarán was appointed head coach for the remainder of the 2015–16 La Liga season, inheriting a side at risk of relegation. He won three consecutive league games over Sevilla, Barcelona, and Eibar, including a 2–1 victory at the Camp Nou. Valencia finished the season in 12th place.

The club confirmed Ayestarán's appointment as full-time manager on 24 May 2016, with a contract running until 30 June 2018. His preparations for the 2016–17 season were heavily disrupted by the club's financial obligations, with Mustafi, Alcácer and Gomes all sold in the summer window for a combined fee of over €106m. However, after a difficult start to the 2016–17 campaign — with four league defeats — he was relieved of his duties on 20 September 2016.

=== Las Palmas ===
Ayestarán replaced Manolo Márquez as the new Las Palmas manager on 27 September 2017. Taking over a struggling side early in the season, he managed seven league matches, recording one draw and six defeats, before being dismissed on 30 November 2017.

=== Pachuca ===
On 29 May 2018, Ayestarán returned to Mexico's top flight as manager of Pachuca in Liga MX. During his time in charge, Pachuca reached the semi-finals of the Copa MX Apertura 2018, recording 13 wins in 28 official matches, averaging 1.64 points per match. He left the club on 20 January 2019.

=== Tondela ===
On 10 August 2020, Ayestarán was appointed head coach of Portuguese Primeira Liga side Tondela. In his first season, he led the club to its best-ever finish in the Primeira Liga, securing 12th place. Following a run of away wins over sides including Moreirense and Vitória de Guimarães, he was named Primeira Liga Manager of the Month for April 2021.

The following year, he guided Tondela to their first-ever Taça de Portugal semi-finals. In the first leg, they earned a 3–0 home victory over Mafra. Ayestarán departed the club on 16 March 2022, shortly before Tondela confirmed their place in the final with a 4–1 aggregate win. During his tenure, he recorded the highest win percentage of any Tondela manager in the Primeira Liga.

=== Aston Villa ===
On 4 November 2022, Ayestarán was announced as assistant head coach to Unai Emery at Aston Villa. On 26 January 2025, Ayestarán took charge of the team for a Premier League fixture against West Ham United, after Emery served a touchline ban. The match ended 1–1. In May 2026, Aston Villa won the 2025–26 UEFA Europa League, defeating Freiburg 3–0 in the final in Istanbul.

On 2 July 2026, Aston Villa announced that Ayestarán had departed the club, replaced in his role as assistant head coach by José María Sanz.

== Personal life ==
Ayestarán is married and has three children: a daughter and two sons. His wife is from Lanzarote, where the family often spends holidays. They have lived in both Spain and England, and Ayestarán maintains a home on the Wirral, which he has described as a second home. He has stated that his son, who spent most of his childhood there, also considers England home.

== Honours ==
=== Assistant Manager ===
Valencia

- La Liga: 2001–02, 2003–04
- UEFA Cup: 2003–04

Liverpool

- UEFA Champions League: 2004–05; runner-up: 2006–07
- UEFA Super Cup: 2005
- FA Cup: 2005–06
- FA Community Shield: 2006
- Football League Cup runner-up: 2004–05
- FIFA Club World Championship runner-up: 2005

Benfica

- Taça da Liga: 2008–09

Al-Ahli Dubai

- UAE League Cup: 2011–12

Aston Villa

- UEFA Europa League: 2025–26

=== Manager ===
Tecos

- Ascenso MX: 2014 Clausura

Maccabi Tel Aviv

- Israeli Premier League: 2014–15
- Israel State Cup: 2014–15
- Toto Cup: 2014–15

Tondela

- Taça de Portugal runner-up: 2021–22

Individual

- Primeira Liga Manager of the Month: April 2021
