= Maccabi Bnei Nahf F.C. =

Israeli football club

Maccabi Bnei Nahf
- Full name: Maccabi Bnei Nahf Qasim F.C. מכבי בני נחף קאסם
- Founded: 2005
- Ground: Nahf Stadium
- Chairman: Hussain Abdallah
- Manager: Fahri Askala
- League: Liga Bet North A
- 2023–24: Liga Bet North A, 10th

Maccabi Bnei Nahf F.C. (Hebrew: מכבי בני נחף) is an Israeli football club based in Nahf. The club currently plays in Liga Bet North A division.

== History ==
The club was founded in 2005 and played in Liga Gimel until the club was promoted to Liga Bet at the end of the 2014–15 season. At the same season, the club won its divisional cup and advanced to the 6th round of the State Cup, where the club met Maccabi Tzur Shalom, but lost 0–1

== Honours ==
=== Cups ===
Honour	No.	Years
Liga Gimel divisional State Cup	1	2014–15
