= Barak Badash =

Israeli footballer

Barak Badash ברק בדש
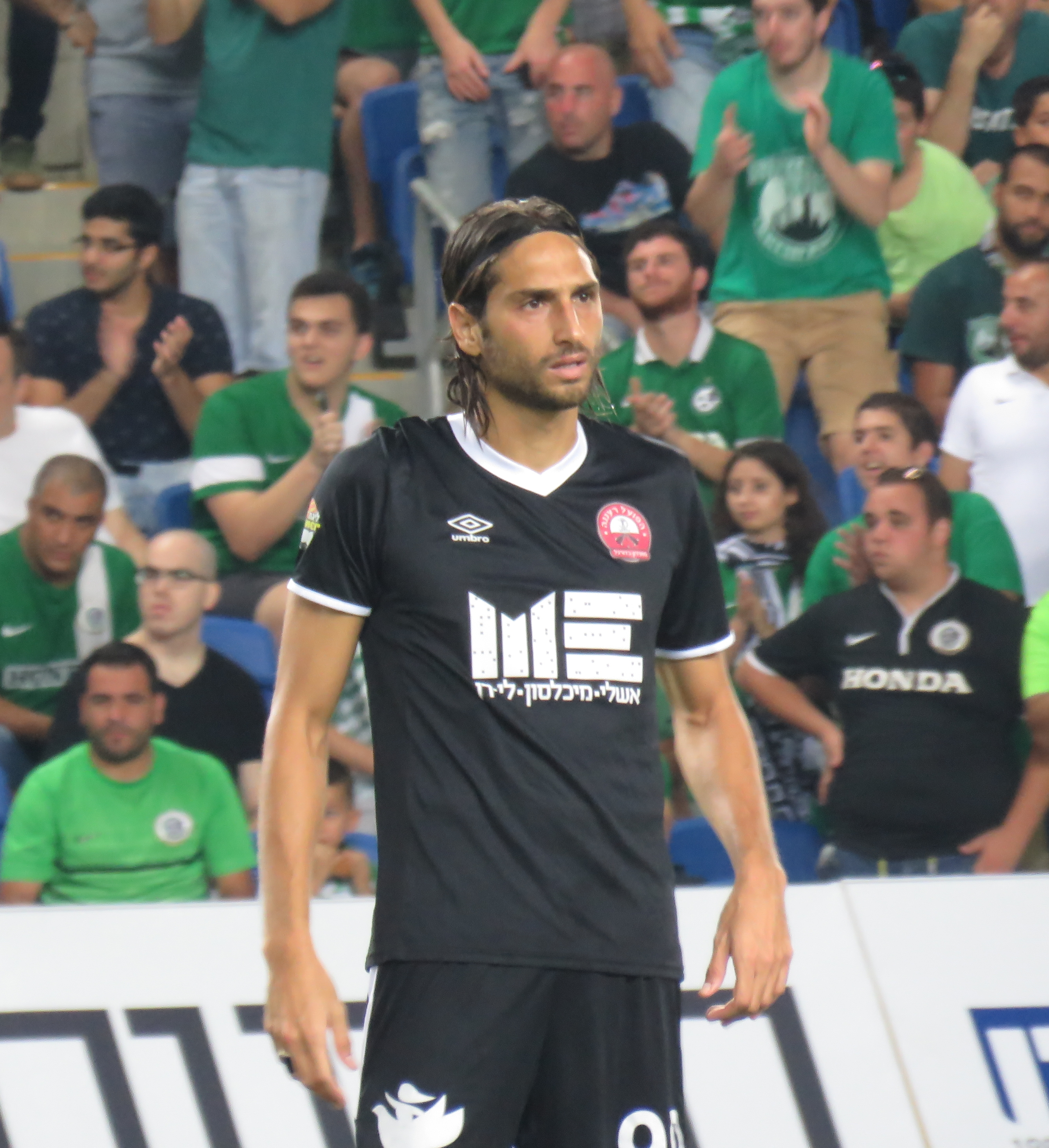
- Badash playing for Hapoel Ra'anana in 2015

Personal information
- Full name: Barak Badash
- Date of birth: 30 August 1982 (age 44)
- Place of birth: Netanya, Israel
- Height: 1.86 m (6 ft 1 in)
- Position: Striker

Youth career
- Maccabi Netanya

Senior career*
Years	Team	Apps	(Gls)
2003–2004	Maccabi Hadera	?	(?)
2004	Maccabi Ramat Amidar	?	(?)
2005	Hapoel Tel Aviv	14	(2)
2005–2007	Bnei Yehuda	47	(2)
2007–2009	Hakoah Ramat Gan	58	(18)
2009–2010	F.C. Ashdod	14	(0)
2010	→ Hapoel Be'er Sheva (loan)	13	(7)
2010–2014	Hapoel Ironi Kiryat Shmona	58	(18)
2012–2013	→ Waasland-Beveren (loan)	25	(8)
2014–2015	Maccabi Tel Aviv	30	(6)
2015–2016	Hapoel Ra'anana	27	(6)
2016–2018	Maccabi Netanya	35	(4)
- * Club domestic league appearances and goals as of 1 June 2016

Barak Badash (Hebrew: ברק בדש) is an Israeli former footballer who played as a striker. He is of a Tunisian-Jewish descent.

== Career ==
Badash began his senior career with the semi-professional team of Maccabi Hadera, from there he transferred to Maccabi Ramat-Amidar, there he played one year and transferred to Hapoel Tel Aviv. Badash played 14 matches with Hapoel and scored two goals. At the end of the season, he was transferred to Bnei Yehuda Tel Aviv, where he played for two years.

In the summer of 2007, he transferred to Hakoah Amidar Ramat-Gan, where he scored 18 goals in 58 appearances. After two years with the club, he transferred to Ashdod and in the middle of the season to Hapoel bear-Sheva, where he scored 7 goals in 13 matches.

On 5 July 2010, he signed with Hapoel Ironi Kiryat Shmona, where he won the Toto Cup in his first season with the club. In the next season, he won the Israeli Championship with Kiryat Shmona, the club's first title. On 30 August 2012, he played on loan in Belgium for Waasland-Beveren. After one season, he returned to Kiryat Shmona.

On 30 January 2014, he moved to Maccabi Tel Aviv after Maccabi paid a $150,000 transfer fee to Kiryat Shmona.

In the 2015–16 season, Badash played for Hapoel Ra'anana.

After 13 years since he left the youth ranks of Maccabi Netanya, Badash returned to his home club and made his senior debut for Netanya on 12 September 2016.

== Personal life ==
On 17 May 2009, Badash married girlfriend Sharon in a Jewish ceremony at Trask, a wedding hall in the Tel Aviv Port area. He is also known by his uncanny resemblance to Swedish international footballer Zlatan Ibrahimović.

== Honours ==
- Israeli Championships (2)
  - 2011–12, 2013–14, 2014–15
- Israel State Cup (1)
  - 2014–15
- Toto Cup (3)
  - 2010–11, 2011–12, 2014–15
- Liga Leumit (2)
  - 2007-08, 2016-17
