= Dor Micha =

Israeli association footballer

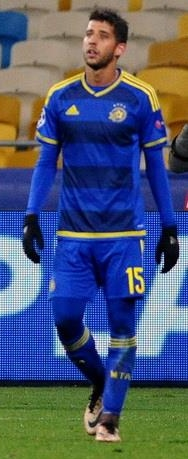
- Micha playing for Maccabi Tel Aviv in 2016

Personal information
- Full name: David Dor Micha
- Date of birth: 2 March 1992 (age 34)
- Place of birth: Givatayim, Israel
- Height: 1.74 m (5 ft 9 in)
- Position: Attacking midfielder

Team information
- Current team: Ashdod
- Number: 15

Youth career
- 2000–2011: Maccabi Tel Aviv

Senior career*
Years	Team	Apps	(Gls)
2011–2020	Maccabi Tel Aviv	283	(30)
2020–2021	Anorthosis Famagusta	28	(1)
2021–2023	Hapoel Be'er Sheva	70	(2)
2023–2026	Beitar Jerusalem	89	(5)
2026–	F.C. Ashdod	0	(0)

International career
2008	Israel U-16	7	(1)
2009–2010	Israel U-18	5	(2)
2010–2011	Israel U-19	9	(2)
2011–2014	Israel U-21	13	(3)
2018	Israel	4	(0)
- * Club domestic league appearances and goals as of 23 June 2026

David Dor Micha (or Miha, Hebrew: דוד דור מיכה; born 2 March 1992) is an Israeli professional footballer who plays as an attacking midfielder for Liga Leumit club F.C. Ashdod.

== Early and personal life ==
Micha was born in Givatayim, Israel, to a family of both Sephardi Jewish and Mizrahi Jewish (Iraqi-Jewish) descent. His father Kobi Micha is a former Israeli footballer who also played for Maccabi Tel Aviv, although he retired at the age of 26 due to a knee injury. Micha attended the Kalai High School in his hometown.

He also holds a Portuguese passport, on account of both his Sephardi Jewish and Mizrahi Jewish (Iraqi-Jewish) ancestry, which eases the move to certain European football leagues.

He was in a relationship with Israeli actress Nuel Berkovich from 2013 to 2020. He married his Israeli girlfriend Almog (née BarNoy) in 2021, and they have a daughter who was born in 2022.

== Club career ==
Micha joined Maccabi Tel Aviv when he was 8 years old. On 2004 he started playing with the youth team and was tagged as a potential talent since he joined. Former international player Eli Ohana, his manager in the Israel U-19 national team, described him in an interview in August 2011 as "the most talented player I have ever managed".

On 12 February 2011, after the arrival of Moti Ivanir as the new manager of Maccabi and as a rejuvenation period led by the club, Micha made his debut for the club against Hapoel Ramat Gan in a match Maccabi Tel Aviv won at the score 3–0. He scored the third goal and assisted another one in that game. On 29 September 2011, he scored his first goal in a European competition, leading his team to a 1–1 draw after a stunning shot against Dynamo Kyiv in Bloomfield Stadium on the UEFA Europa League group stage.

In the 2012–2013 season Micha was a key player in Maccabi Tel Aviv's success in retaining the championship, playing 28 games and scoring five goals, and mostly excelled during the latter stages of the season after scoring in both derby matches against Hapoel Tel Aviv in the playoffs.

In the 2013–14 season Micha continued his good run from the end of the last season by scoring a crucial away goal against Bordeaux in the Europa League group stage, which obtained Maccabi its first ever win in the competitions group stage.

== International career ==
On 5 September 2011, Micha made his international youth debut with the Israel U-21 team against England. The decision to not include him in the squad for the UEFA European Under-21 Championship in 2013 was controversial. Micha was a central figure in the team during the 2015 European Under-21 Championship qualifications which Israel finished second and was supposed to qualify but did not since only the best four teams who finished second in the groups qualified.

Micha was called up to the senior Israeli squad for a friendly match against Serbia in May 2016.

== Career statistics ==
=== Club ===
As of 1 June 2026

Appearances and goals by club, season and competition
Club	Season	League			State Cup		League Cup		Europe		Super Cup		Total	
Club	Season	Division	Apps	Goals	Apps	Goals	Apps	Goals	Apps	Goals	Apps	Goals	Apps	Goals
Maccabi Tel Aviv	2010–11	Israeli Premier League	8	1	0	0	0	0	0	0	0	0	8	1
Maccabi Tel Aviv	2011–12	Israeli Premier League	34	3	1	0	3	2	8	1	0	0	46	6
Maccabi Tel Aviv	2012–13	Israeli Premier League	28	5	1	0	4	0	0	0	0	0	33	5
Maccabi Tel Aviv	2013–14	Israeli Premier League	31	3	1	0	0	0	7	1	0	0	39	4
Maccabi Tel Aviv	2014–15	Israeli Premier League	32	5	4	0	3	0	5	0	0	0	44	5
Maccabi Tel Aviv	2015–16	Israeli Premier League	30	3	5	1	4	0	10	0	1	0	55	6
Maccabi Tel Aviv	2016–17	Israeli Premier League	32	2	6	1	3	2	12	2	0	0	55	7
Maccabi Tel Aviv	2017–18	Israeli Premier League	28	1	2	0	5	0	7	0	0	0	42	1
Maccabi Tel Aviv	2018–19	Israeli Premier League	30	4	4	2	2	0	8	1	0	0	44	7
Maccabi Tel Aviv	2019–20	Israeli Premier League	28	3	2	0	2	0	4	0	1	0	37	3
Maccabi Tel Aviv	Total		282	30	28	4	26	4	67	5	2	0	405	36
Anorthosis	2020–21	Cypriot First Division	28	1	6	1	0	0	1	0	0	0	35	1
Anorthosis	Total		28	1	6	1	0	0	1	0	0	0	35	1
Hapoel Be'er Sheva	2021–22	Israeli Premier League	34	1	5	1	3	0	6	1	0	0	48	3
Hapoel Be'er Sheva	2022–23	Israeli Premier League	36	1	1	0	2	0	1	0	1	0	41	1
Hapoel Be'er Sheva	Total		70	2	6	1	5	0	7	1	1	0	89	4
Beitar Jerusalem	2023–24	Israeli Premier League	25	2	1	0	1	0	0	0	1	0	28	2
Beitar Jerusalem	2024–25	Israeli Premier League	32	1	3	0	5	2	0	0	0	0	40	3
Beitar Jerusalem	2025–26	Israeli Premier League	32	2	3	0	2	1	3	0	0	0	40	3
Total			89	5	7	0	8	3	3	0	1	0	108	8
Career total			469	38	47	6	39	7	78	6	4	0	637	49

=== International ===
Appearances and goals by national team and year
National team	Year	Apps	Goals
Israel	2018	4	0
Total		4	0

== Honours ==
Maccabi Tel Aviv

- Israeli Premier League: 2012–13, 2013–14, 2014–15, 2018–19
- Israel State Cup: 2014–15
- Israel Toto Cup (Ligat Ha'al): 2014–15, 2017–18, 2018–19
- Israel Super Cup: 2019

Anorthosis Famagusta

- Cypriot Cup: 2020–21

Hapoel Be'er Sheva

- Israel State Cup: 2021–22
- Israel Super Cup: 2022

Individual

- Israeli Premier League Most Assists: 2016–17, 2018–19
- Israeli Footballer of the Year: 2018–19

== See also ==
- List of Jewish footballers
- List of Jews in sports
- List of Israelis
