= Eitan Tibi =

Israeli footballer

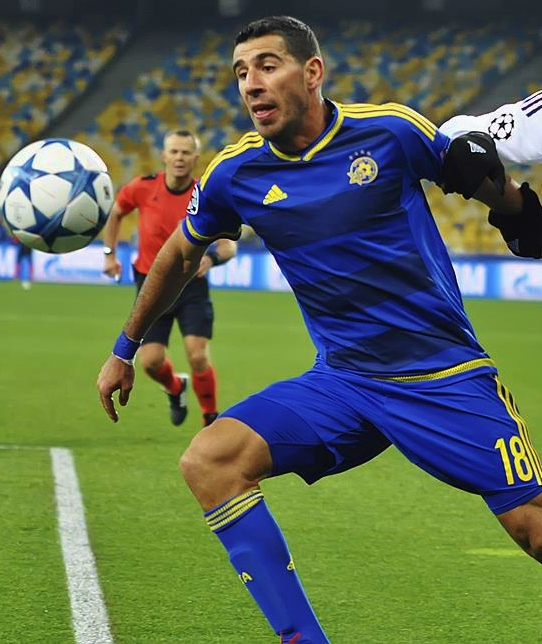
- Tibi playing for Maccabi Tel Aviv in 2015

Personal information
- Date of birth: 16 November 1987 (age 38)
- Place of birth: Jerusalem, Israel
- Height: 1.85 m (6 ft 1 in)
- Position: Centre-back

Team information
- Current team: Maccabi Petah Tikva
- Number: 18

Youth career
- Beitar Haifa
- 2005–2006: Maccabi Netanya

Senior career*
Years	Team	Apps	(Gls)
2006–2010	Beitar Jerusalem	23	(0)
2007–2008	→ Hapoel Ra'anana (loan)	33	(2)
2008–2009	→ Hakoah Amidar Ramat Gan (loan)	28	(4)
2010–2011	Charleroi	9	(0)
2011–2012	Ironi Kiryat Shmona	31	(0)
2012–2021	Maccabi Tel Aviv	247	(5)
2021–2025	Hapoel Be'er Sheva	78	(1)
2025–	Maccabi Petah Tikva	22	(2)

International career^{‡}
2012–2021	Israel	57	(1)
- * Club domestic league appearances and goals as of 24 June 2026 ‡ National team caps and goals as of 19:09, 16 March 2025

Eitan Tibi (or Eytan, Hebrew: איתן טיבי; born 16 November 1987) is an Israeli professional footballer who plays as a centre-back for Maccabi Petah Tikva and the Israel national team.

== Early life ==
Tibi was born in Jerusalem, Israel, to a Sephardic Jewish family.

== Club career ==
Tibi started his career in the youth teams of Beitar Haifa and Maccabi Netanya. In 2006–07 he signed for Beitar Jerusalem for four years at the age of 19. On his senior year with the club he could not break into the first team and in 2007–08 he was loaned to Hapoel Ra'anana. In 2008–09 he was loaned again to HaKoach Ramat Gan.

In 2009–10 Tibi returned to Beitar Jerusalem and played 21 league games with the club, before signing a two-years contract with the Belgian side Charleroi. After just 9 games with the club and his inability to find a place in the starting lineup, he decided to return to Israel.

In January 2011 Tibi signed a 3 1/2-year contract with Ironi Kiryat Shmona. In 2011–12 he was a key part in the historic championship title win of Ironi Kiryat Shmona, together with the Toto Cup Al win. At the end of that season he made his debut for the Israel national team against Czech Republic.

=== Maccabi Tel Aviv ===
On 29 August 2012, Tibi signed a three-year contract with Maccabi Tel Aviv, after long negotiations with Ironi Kiryat Shmona owner Izi Sheratzky about the release-clause in his contract. With arbitration advice, it appeared the €300,000 release-clause was valid and Tibi was allowed to join Maccabi. He made his debut for the club on 3 September 2012, in the first gameweek of the season, against Maccabi Netanya. His remarkable form in 2012–13 made Tibi a vital part in the middle of defense for Maccabi, together with Carlos García, and he was lined-up 34 times in the league. He scored his first goal for Maccabi on 2 March 2013 in an away match against Bnei Sakhnin. In that season he won his second consecutive championship title and his first one with Maccabi Tel Aviv. On 17 July 2013, he made his first appearance in a European match, in the second qualifying round of the UEFA Champions League against Győri ETO FC. Maccabi eventually qualified to the Europa League.

Tibi started 2013–14 season extremely well, leading the club to a new Israeli Premier League record, after Maccabi Tel Aviv conceded its first goal of the season only in the 45th minute of the 7th gameweek. The previous record was held by Hapoel Haifa in 1998–99. He won the 2013–14 season's championship with Maccabi. In 2014–15, he won with Maccabi the third consecutive championship, this season he also won the State Cup and Toto Cup.

In 2015–16, he qualified with Maccabi to the UEFA Champions League group stage. In the 2015–16 season in the Israeli Premier League, Tibi lost with Maccabi the championship to Hapoel Be'er Sheva. He signed a contract extension with Maccabi for three years in the end of the season.

=== Hapoel Be'er Sheva ===
On 28 June 2021, Tibi signed for two years at Hapoel Be'er Sheva.

== International career ==
In 2012 Tibi made his debut for the national team in a friendly match against Czech Republic. His form at his club, Maccabi Tel Aviv, has made him a first-team regular, playing steadily for the national team under the lead of Eli Guttman and maintaining good performances.

== Career statistics ==
=== Club ===
As of 1 June 2022

Appearances and goals by club, season and competition
Club	Season	League			National cup		League cup		Continental		Total	
Club	Season	Division	Apps	Goals	Apps	Goals	Apps	Goals	Apps	Goals	Apps	Goals
Beitar Jerusalem	2006–07	Israeli Premier League	2	0	0	0	8	0	0	0	10	0
Beitar Jerusalem	2009–10	Israeli Premier League	21	0	1	0	8	0	0	0	30	0
Beitar Jerusalem	Total		23	0	1	0	16	0	0	0	40	0
Hapoel Ra'anana (loan)	2007–08	Liga Leumit	33	2	1	0	8	0	0	0	42	2
Hakoah Amidar Ramat Gan (loan)	2008–09	Israeli Premier League	28	4	4	0	2	0	0	0	34	4
Charleroi	2010–11	Belgian First Division	9	0	0	0	0	0	0	0	9	0
Ironi Kiryat Shmona	2010–11	Israeli Premier League	8	0	0	0	3	0	0	0	11	0
Ironi Kiryat Shmona	2011–12	Israeli Premier League	23	0	2	0	6	0	0	0	31	0
Ironi Kiryat Shmona	Total		31	0	2	0	9	0	0	0	42	0
Maccabi Tel Aviv	2012–13	Israeli Premier League	34	1	2	0	2	0	0	0	38	1
Maccabi Tel Aviv	2013–14	Israeli Premier League	31	0	0	0	0	0	12	0	43	0
Maccabi Tel Aviv	2014–15	Israeli Premier League	34	0	0	0	4	1	6	0	44	1
Maccabi Tel Aviv	2015–16	Israeli Premier League	31	0	1	0	1	0	9	0	42	0
Maccabi Tel Aviv	2016–17	Israeli Premier League	26	0	5	0	5	0	13	0	49	0
Maccabi Tel Aviv	2017–18	Israeli Premier League	25	0	1	0	3	0	12	0	41	0
Maccabi Tel Aviv	2018–19	Israeli Premier League	8	0	2	0	2	0	8	0	20	0
Maccabi Tel Aviv	2019–20	Israeli Premier League	29	3	0	0	2	0	0	0	31	3
Maccabi Tel Aviv	2020–21	Israeli Premier League	26	1	5	0	0	0	13	0	44	1
Maccabi Tel Aviv	Total		244	5	16	0	19	1	73	0	352	6
Hapoel Be'er Sheva	2021–22	Israeli Premier League	22	1	4	0	1	0	6	0	33	1
Career total			411	13	32	0	56	1	85	0	564	14

=== International ===
As of 11 September 2018

Appearances and goals by national team and year
National team	Year	Apps	Goals
Israel	2012	7	0
Israel	2013	8	0
Israel	2014	3	0
Israel	2015	5	0
Israel	2016	5	0
Israel	2017	4	1
Israel	2018	2	0
Total		36	1

Scores and results list Israel's goal tally first.

No	Date	Venue	Opponent	Score	Result	Competition
1.	7 October 2017	Rheinpark Stadion, Vaduz, Liechtenstein	Liechtenstein	1–0	1–0	2018 FIFA World Cup qualification

== Honours ==
Beitar Jerusalem

- Premier League (1): 2006–07

Ironi Kiryat Shmona

- Premier League (1): 2011–12
- Toto Cup (1): 2011–12

Maccabi Tel Aviv

- Premier League (5): 2012–13, 2013–14, 2014–15, 2018–19, 2019-20
- State Cup (2): 2014–15, 2020–21
- Toto Cup (4): 2014–15, 2017–18, 2018–19, 2020-21
- Super Cup (2): 2019, 2020

Hapoel Be'er Sheva

- State Cup (1): 2021–22, 2024–25
- Super Cup: 2022
