= Barak Levi =

Israeli footballer

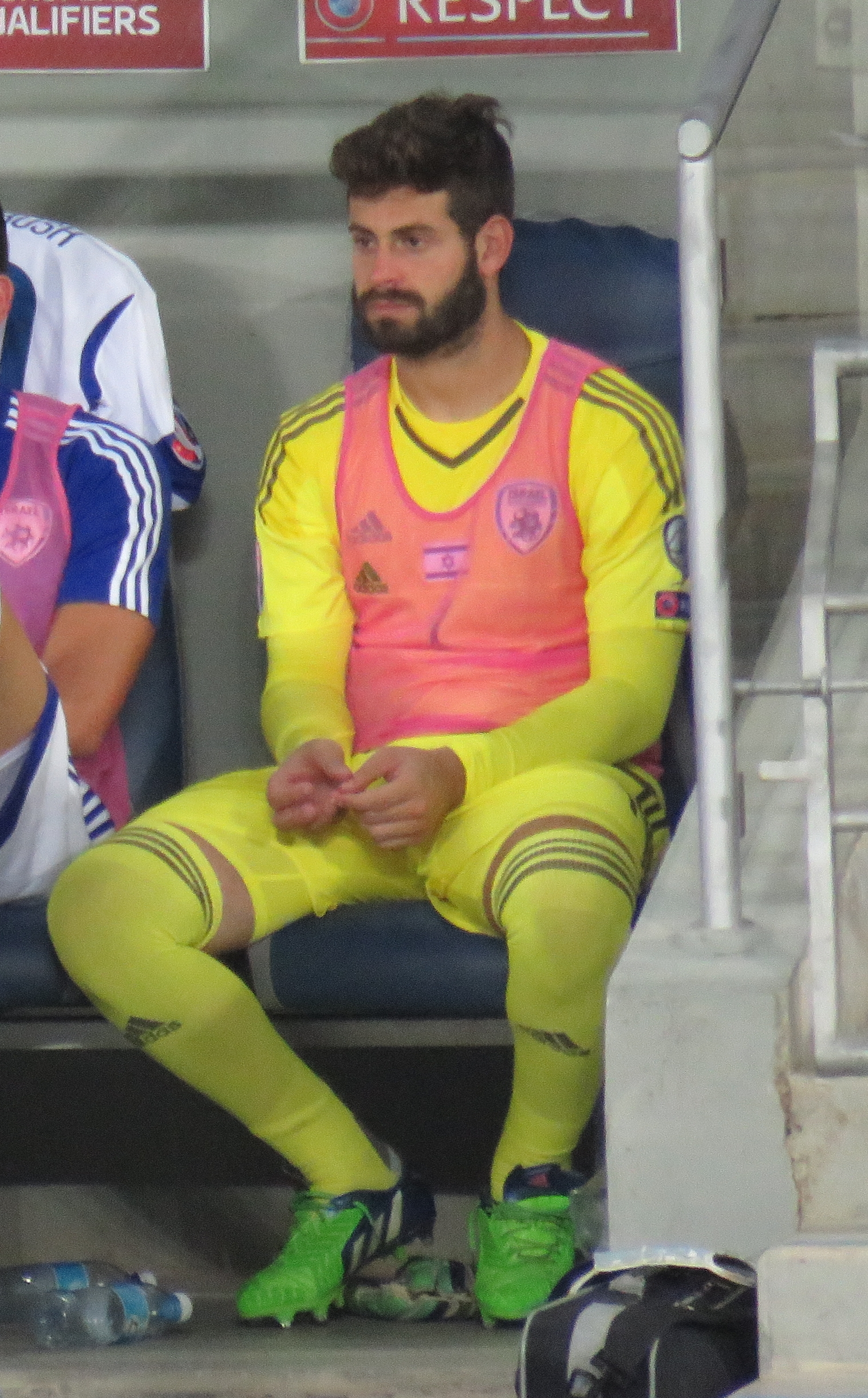
- Levi on the bench for Israel in 2015

Personal information
- Full name: Barak Levi
- Date of birth: 7 January 1993 (age 33)
- Place of birth: Rishon LeZion, Israel
- Height: 1.88 m (6 ft 2 in)
- Position: Goalkeeper

Team information
- Current team: Hapoel Nof HaGalil

Youth career
- Maccabi Tel Aviv

Senior career*
Years	Team	Apps	(Gls)
2011–2017	Maccabi Tel Aviv	44	(0)
2015–2016	→ Maccabi Netanya (loan)	23	(0)
2017–2019	Hapoel Katamon	64	(0)
2019–2020	Hapoel Petah Tikva	27	(0)
2020–2021	Bnei Yehuda	3	(0)
2021–2022	Hapoel Ra'anana	26	(0)
2022–2023	Hapoel Nof HaGalil	21	(0)

International career
2010–2011	Israel U19	10	(0)
2011–2014	Israel U21	10	(0)
- * Club domestic league appearances and goals as of 15 June 2023

Barak Levi (or Levy, Hebrew: ברק לוי; born 7 January 1993) is an Israeli footballer who plays as a goalkeeper for Hapoel Nof HaGalil.

== Early life ==
Levi was born in Rishon LeZion, Israel to a Jewish family.

== Club career ==
Levi grew up in the Maccabi Tel Aviv youth academy. He made his debut with the senior team on 23 April 2011. Levi started in Maccabi's Europa League clash against Stoke City on 3 November 2011, conceding two goals in a 2–1 defeat.

== Honours ==
Maccabi Tel Aviv

- Israeli Premier League (3): 2012–13, 2013–14, 2014–15
- Israel State Cup (1): 2014-2015
- Toto Cup (1): 2014–15
