= Gael Margulies =

Israeli footballer

Gael Margulies גאל מרגוליס
Personal information
- Full name: Gael Margulies
- Date of birth: 3 April 1994 (age 32)
- Place of birth: Ramat HaSharon, Israel
- Height: 1.75 m (5 ft 9 in)
- Position: Forward

Team information
- Current team: Beitar Tel Aviv Ramla

Youth career
- 2006–2012: Maccabi Tel Aviv

Senior career*
Years	Team	Apps	(Gls)
2011–2017	Maccabi Tel Aviv	26	(1)
2015–2016	→ Maccabi Netanya (loan)	22	(2)
2016–2017	→ Beitar Tel Aviv Ramla (loan)	19	(4)
- * Club domestic league appearances and goals as of 1 June 2016

Gael Margulies (Hebrew: גאל מרגוליס; born 3 April 1994) is an Israeli footballer who played as a forward for Beitar Tel Aviv Ramla.

Margulies studied at Rothberg High School at Ramat HaSharon. Aside being an Israeli, he also holds a Belgian citizenship.

== Early life ==
Margulies was born in Ramat HaSharon, Israel, to a Jewish family.

== Club career ==
Margulies started his career at the age of 9 in Maccabi Tel Aviv youth team. At the age of 16, he was called for a one-week-trial by the Premier League famous club, Arsenal.

On 21 May 2011, at the age of 17, Margulies made his debut in the Israeli Premier League, in a match between Maccabi Tel Aviv and Maccabi Netnaya which was won by Maccabi at the score 4–1, wearing the number 34 shirt at his back. Margulies substituted Maor Bozaglo at the 75th minute and had an instant effect by retaining a penalty kick for his club at the 87th minute, which was later scored by Barak Itzhaki. At that season, 2010/2011 Margulies retained the championship with the youth squad of Maccabi Tel Aviv.

On 2011/2012, Margulies led his team for a 2nd consecutive championship in the youth league, scoring 16 goals and being elected as Players-Player-Of-The-Year by the league players, despite an absence of a month from the football pitch, due to long contracts negotiations with Maccabi. His goals earned him the Best-Scorer of the season title in the league. On 3 July 2012, after lot of negotiations, Margulies committed his future to Maccabi Tel Aviv by signing a 5-years contract.

On 30 December 2012, at the age of 18, Margulies scored his 1st ever goal for the senior club of Maccabi Tel Aviv, at the 75th minute of the match against Hapoel Haifa in Bloomfield Stadium after being substituted into the game.

Margulies made his UEFA Champions League debut during the 3rd qualifying round against F.C. Basel on 6 August 2013 after replacing Eran Zahavi at the 63rd minute.

On 13 July 2015 on loaned to Maccabi Netanya.

== Career statistics ==
=== Club ===
As of 23 October 2013.

Season	Club	League	League			Cup			League Cup			Europe			Total		
Season	Club	League	Apps	Goals	Assists	Apps	Goals	Assists	Apps	Goals	Assists	Apps	Goals	Assists	Apps	Goals	Assists
2010-11	Maccabi Tel Aviv	IPL	1	0	0	0	0	0	0	0	0	0	0	0	1	0	0
2011-12	Maccabi Tel Aviv	IPL	0	0	0	0	0	0	0	0	0	0	0	0	0	0	0
2012-13	Maccabi Tel Aviv	IPL	11	1	0	0	0	0	2	0	0	0	0	0	13	1	0
2013-14	Maccabi Tel Aviv	IPL	4	0	0	0	0	0	0	0	0	1	0	0	5	0	0
Career Total			16	1	0	0	0	0	2	0	0	1	0	0	19	1	0

== Honours ==
Maccabi Tel Aviv

- Israeli Premier League: 2012–13, 2013–14, 2014–15
- Israel State Cup: 2014-2015
- Toto Cup: 2014-2015
