= Moshe Lugasi =

Israeli footballer

Moshe Lugasi משה לוגסי
Personal information
- Full name: Moshe Lugasi
- Date of birth: 4 February 1991 (age 35)
- Place of birth: Kiryat Gat, Israel
- Height: 1.76 m (5 ft 9 1/2 in)
- Position: Midfielder

Youth career
- 2002–2005: Maccabi Kiryat Gat
- 2005–2010: Maccabi Tel Aviv

Senior career*
Years	Team	Apps	(Gls)
2011–2018	Maccabi Tel Aviv	44	(2)
2014	→ Beitar Jerusalem (loan)	12	(0)
2014–2015	→ Maccabi Petah Tikva (loan)	17	(1)
2015–2016	→ Maccabi Netanya (loan)	22	(0)
2016–2018	→ Hapoel Ashkelon (loan)	27	(0)
2018–2019	Hapoel Ramat Gan	23	(0)

International career
2006–2009	Israel U17	12	(0)
2011–2013	Israel U21	4	(0)
- * Club domestic league appearances and goals

Moshe Lugasi (Hebrew: משה לוגסי; born 4 February 1991) is an Israeli footballer.

== Career ==
Lugasi started playing in the Maccabi Tel Aviv youth academy. He was promoted to the senior team in 2011 alongside few other young players. During the 2012/2013 season Lugasi tried to pick himself a regular place in the first team. On 18 February 2013 Lugasi won a match against Bnei Yehuda after an absolutely sunning strike in the 98th minute from the corner of the box into the top woodwork and in. Maccabi won this game at the score 3–2. That goal later appeared to be crucial for Maccabi in the run for the title in that season.

== Honours ==
Maccabi Tel Aviv

- Israeli Premier League (1): 2012–13
