= Yoav Ziv =

Israeli footballer and manager

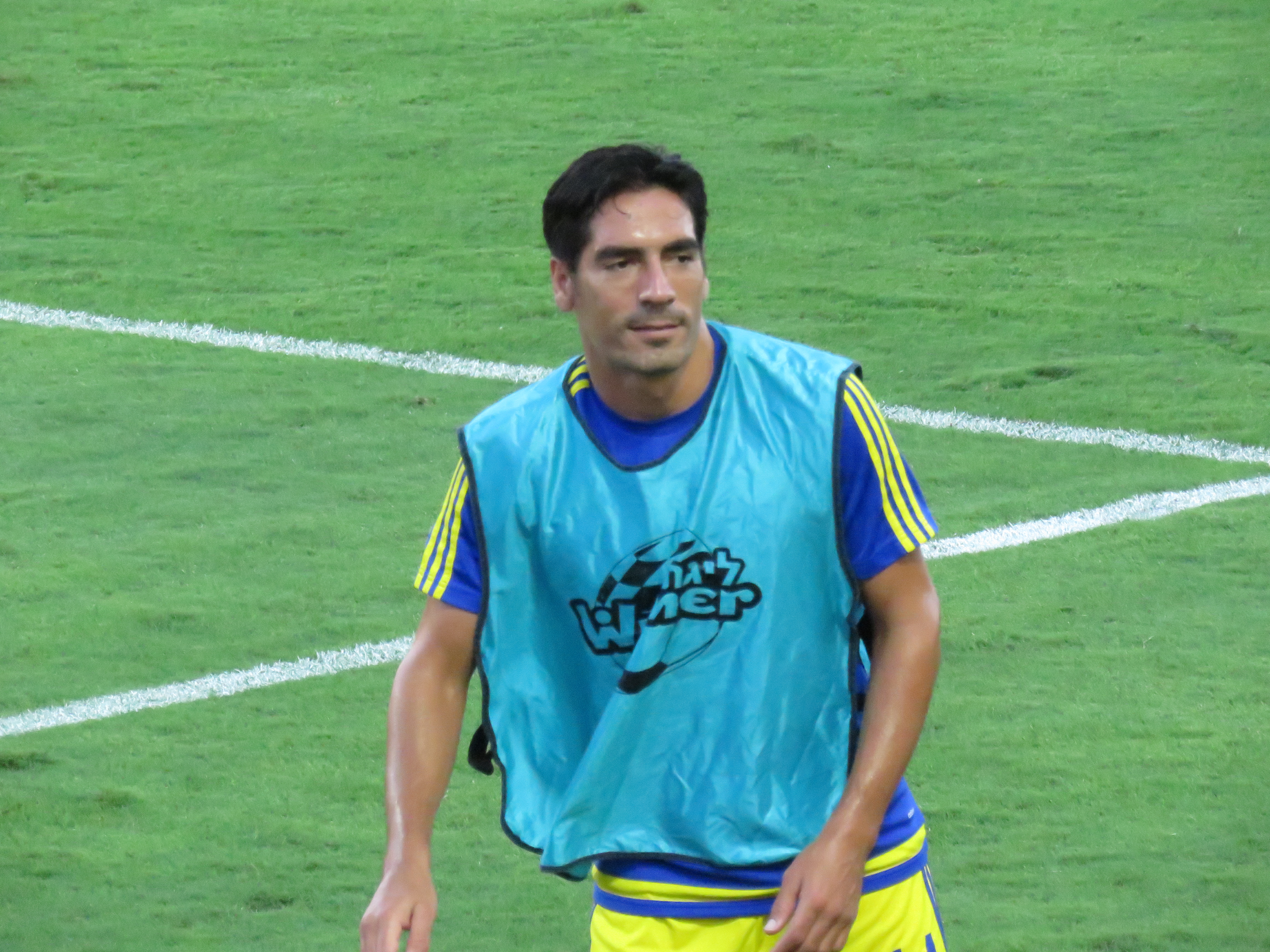
- Ziv with Maccabi Tel Aviv in 2015

Personal information
- Full name: Yoav David Ziv
- Date of birth: 16 March 1981 (age 45)
- Place of birth: Hadera, Israel
- Height: 5 ft 10 in (1.78 m)
- Position: Defender

Youth career
- F.C. Givat Olga
- Maccabi Hadera
- 1998–2001: Maccabi Haifa

Senior career*
Years	Team	Apps	(Gls)
2000–2001	Maccabi Haifa	1	(0)
2002–2003	Hapoel Haifa	16	(2)
2003–2005	Hapoel Nazareth Illit	62	(11)
2005–2009	Beitar Jerusalem	99	(3)
2009–2010	Lokeren	39	(3)
2010–2016	Maccabi Tel Aviv	134	(3)
2016–2017	Hapoel Petah Tikva	19	(2)

International career^{‡}
2002	Israel U21	1	(0)
2006–2012	Israel	32	(0)
- * Club domestic league appearances and goals as of 22 October 2016 ‡ National team caps and goals as of 12 July 2013

Yoav David Ziv (Hebrew: יואב זיו; born 16 March 1981) is a retired Israeli footballer. He is currently the first team manager in Maccabi Tel Aviv. As a player he could perform on either flank of the formation, usually attacking from defence as he is adept with both feet, although he favoured the right.

== Early life ==
Ziv was born in Hadera, Israel, to a Jewish family.

== Club career ==
He started playing for Maccabi Haifa in the youth level, he was part of the team that won the 1998–99 season of the Israeli Noar Premier League. He later played with Hapoel Haifa and Hapoel Nazareth Illit with which he achieved promotion from the Liga Leumit to the Israeli Premier League.

In 2006, he moved to Beitar Jerusalem and established himself as a fan favourite, being able to play in both wings or both fullback positions, and even as a central defender. This came as a surprise since Ziv played as a striker in Nazareth.

Before the 2006/2007 seasons there were rumors that Ossie Ardiles might let Ziv go or that Ziv's role will diminish. Under Manager Yossi Mizrahi though, Yoav Ziv regained his status and became a more regular player in the starting lineup playing as the right wingback.

On 28 January 2009, Ziv was signed by Belgian club KSC Lokeren for a €75,000 transfer fee on a two-and-a-half-year contract from Beitar Jerusalem.

In April 2010 Maccabi Tel Aviv announced that Ziv signed a three-year contract with the club . On 15 July Ziv made his official debut with the Maccabi at UEFA Europa League against FK Mogren and scored his first goal for Maccabi Tel Aviv. During the 2011–12 UEFA Europa League match against Stoke City, he kicked his loose boot at the assistant referee and was sent off.

In October 2016 signed to Liga Leumit club Hapoel Petah Tikva.

In July 2017, Ziv retired from football and was made the first team manager in Maccabi Tel Aviv.

== International career ==
Ziv played a single match for the Israel national under-21 football team. On 15 August 2006, Ziv made his debut for the Israel national football team in a friendly against Slovenia in a game that finished 1–1.

== Honours ==
=== Club ===
Maccabi Haifa

- Israeli Premier League:

2000/2001

Beitar Jerusalem

- Israeli Premier League:2006–07, 2007–08
- Israel State Cup: 2007–08

Maccabi Tel Aviv

- Israeli Premier League: 2012–13, 2013–14, 2014–15
- Israel State Cup: 2014–15
- Toto Cup: 2014–15
