= Uri Peso =

Israeli footballer

Uri Peso פסו אורי
Personal information
- Full name: Uri Peso
- Date of birth: January 8, 1987 (age 39)
- Place of birth: Jerusalem, Israel
- Position: Center back

Team information
- Current team: Sektzia Ness Ziona

Senior career*
Years	Team	Apps	(Gls)
2005–2012	Hapoel Jerusalem	117	(4)
2009–2010	→ Beitar ShimshonTel Aviv (loan)	16	(1)
2012–2013	Ayia Napa	7	(0)
2013–2018	Hapoel Petah Tikva	97	(5)
2017–2018	→ Hapoel Katamon (loan)	21	(2)
2018–2019	Hapoel Rishon LeZion	24	(1)
2019–2020	Maccabi Yavne	19	(1)
2020–2021	Tzeirei Tayibe	19	(1)
2021–2022	Maccabi Yavne	28	(2)
2022–2024	Beitar Nordia Jerusalem	27	(2)
2024	Ironi Beit Dagan	6	(0)
2024–	Sektzia Ness Ziona	11	(0)
- * Club domestic league appearances and goals as of 11 December 2024

Uri Peso (Hebrew: פסו אורי; born 8 January 1987 in Jerusalem) is an Israeli footballer who currently plays for Sektzia Ness Ziona.

== Honours ==
- Israeli Third Division (1):
  - 2010-11
