= Ben Reichert =

Israeli footballer

Personal information
- Full name: Ben Reichert
- Date of birth: 4 March 1994 (age 32)
- Place of birth: Ramat HaSharon, Israel
- Height: 1.80 m (5 ft 11 in)
- Position: Midfielder

Team information
- Current team: Shimshon Tel Aviv

Youth career
- Ironi Nir Ramat HaSharon
- 2006–2007: Hapoel Tel Aviv
- 2007–2012: Maccabi Haifa
- 2012–2013: Ironi Nir Ramat HaSharon

Senior career*
Years	Team	Apps	(Gls)
2013–2014	Ironi Nir Ramat HaSharon	30	(3)
2014–2015	Maccabi Tel Aviv	5	(0)
2015	→ Hapoel Tel Aviv (loan)	10	(2)
2015–2017	Hapoel Tel Aviv	55	(1)
2017–2019	Zulte Waregem	0	(0)
2018	→ Hapoel Acre (loan)	10	(0)
2018–2019	→ F.C. Ashdod (loan)	19	(1)
2019–2020	Hapoel Nir Ramat HaSharon	10	(2)
2020–2021	Hapoel Kfar Saba	38	(1)
2021–2022	Maccabi Petah Tikva	8	(0)
2022	Bnei Yehuda	13	(0)
2022–2024	Hapoel Nir Ramat HaSharon	52	(6)
2024	Hapoel Kfar Shalem	2	(0)
2024–	Shimshon Tel Aviv	0	(0)

International career
2014–2017	Israel U21	7	(1)
- * Club domestic league appearances and goals as of 1 September 2022

Ben Reichert (Hebrew: בן רייכרט; born 4 March 1994) is an Israeli footballer who plays as a midfielder for Shimshon Tel Aviv.

== Career statistics ==
=== Club ===
As of 23 July 2017

Club	Season	League			National Cup		League Cup		Other		Total	
Club	Season	Division	Apps	Goals	Apps	Goals	Apps	Goals	Apps	Goals	Apps	Goals
Hapoel Nir Ramat HaSharon	2012–13	Ligat Ha'al	1	0	0	0	0	0	~	~	1	0
Hapoel Nir Ramat HaSharon	2013–14	Ligat Ha'al	29	3	2	0	0	0	~	~	31	3
Hapoel Nir Ramat HaSharon	Subtotal		30	3	2	0	0	0	~	~	32	3
Maccabi Tel Aviv	2014–15	Ligat Ha'al	5	0	2	1	3	1	~	~	10	2
Hapoel Tel Aviv (loan)	2013–14	Ligat Ha'al	10	2	~	~	~	~	~	~	10	2
Hapoel Tel Aviv	2014–15	Ligat Ha'al	27	0	2	1	1	0	~	~	30	1
Hapoel Tel Aviv	2015–16	Ligat Ha'al	28	1	1	0	4	0	~	~	33	1
Hapoel Tel Aviv	Subtotal		55	1	3	1	5	0	~	~	63	2
Zulte Waregem	2017–18	First Division A	0	0	0	0	0	0	0	0	0	0
Career total			100	6	7	2	8	1	0	0	115	9
