= Tal Ben Haim (footballer, born 1989) =

Israeli footballer

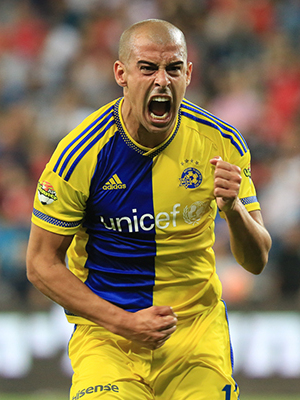
- Ben Haim with Maccabi Tel Aviv in 2016

Personal information
- Date of birth: 5 August 1989 (age 37)
- Place of birth: Kfar Saba, Israel
- Height: 1.79 m (5 ft 10 1/2 in)
- Positions: Winger; forward

Team information
- Current team: Maccabi Petah Tikva
- Number: 11

Youth career
- 2003–2007: Maccabi Petah Tikva

Senior career*
Years	Team	Apps	(Gls)
2007–2012	Maccabi Petah Tikva	122	(29)
2012–2013	Hapoel Tel Aviv	30	(7)
2013–2017	Maccabi Tel Aviv	119	(34)
2017–2020	Sparta Prague	20	(0)
2020–2022	Maccabi Tel Aviv	51	(7)
2022–2024	Maccabi Petah Tikva	35	(13)

International career^{‡}
2007–2008	Israel U19	4	(1)
2008–2010	Israel U21	9	(1)
2011–2018	Israel	27	(5)
- * Club domestic league appearances and goals as of 1 April 2024 ‡ National team caps and goals as of 9 October 2016

Tal Ben Haim (or Tal Ben Haim II, Hebrew: טל בן-חיים; born 5 August 1989), also known as Tal Ben Chaim, is an Israeli footballer who plays for Maccabi Petah Tikva as a winger. He can also play in the forward position.

== Early life ==
Ben-Haim was born in Kfar Saba, Israel, to a Jewish family. His father is former footballer Ofir Ben Haim.

== Career ==
=== Maccabi Petah Tikva ===
Ben Haim started his career with Maccabi Petah Tikva's youth team when he was 14 years old. During the 2007–08 season he started playing for the youth ranks of the club, scoring 19 goals in the Israeli Noar Premier League, and late in the season he earned promotion to the senior team. On 3 May 2008 he made his debut for the club in a match against Bnei Yehuda Tel Aviv. He scored his first goal in the Israeli Premier League against Hapoel Tel Aviv on 24 May 2008.

In the 2008–09 season Ben Haim become a regular choice for the senior squad, and in 2009–10 he occupied the forward position in the club alongside Omer Damari. At the end of the 2011–12 summer transfer window Ben Haim was about to move to Hapoel Tel Aviv after his teammate Omer Damari has moved earlier in that period, but the deal was cut short and he remained with the club for another season. That season was a bad one for the club and eventually it was relegated to the second division.

=== Hapoel Tel Aviv ===
On 16 July 2012, Ben Haim officially signed a two-year contract with Hapoel Tel Aviv in a complicated contract that left Maccabi Petah Tikva 75% of the fees from his next transfer, alongside a release clause of €1.5 million. He made his debut for the club on his 23rd birthday, 5 August 2012, in the Toto Cup. Seven days later he scored his first goal for the club in the Toto Cup against Maccabi Netanya. On 23 August 2012 he made his first appearance in a European competition against the Luxembourg side F91 Dudelange in a match he also scored. Three days later he scored his first goal in the Israeli Premier League for Hapoel Tel Aviv against Hapoel Rishon LeZion.

=== Maccabi Tel Aviv ===
On 25 June 2013 Ben Haim was purchased by Maccabi Tel Aviv in a deal including €1.1 million and a future 25% sell-fee to Maccabi Petah Tikva, and he officially signed a four-year contract with the club. He made his debut for the club on 17 July 2013 in the 2013–14 UEFA Champions League second qualifying round match against Győri ETO FC. Ben Haim scored his first goal for the club in the second leg of the match against Győri ETO FC just one week later.

He made his debut for Maccabi in the Israeli Premier League in the first round against Hapoel Acre, providing an assist in a match won 2–0. On 28 September 2013 he scored his first league goal for Maccabi in a 3–0 victory over Ironi Kiryat Shmona. He finished his first season for Maccabi with a championship. The 2014–15 season was successful as well as he won a local Treble with Maccabi.

A season later he qualified with his team to the Champions League Group Stage for the first time in 11 years. He finished the season with 10 league goals in 31 appearances.

=== Sparta Prague ===
In June 2017, Ben Haim joined Sparta Prague on a four-year deal, reportedly worth around €1 million per season after Sparta had activated a €2.9 million release clause in Ben Haim's contract with Maccabi Tel Aviv.

== International career ==
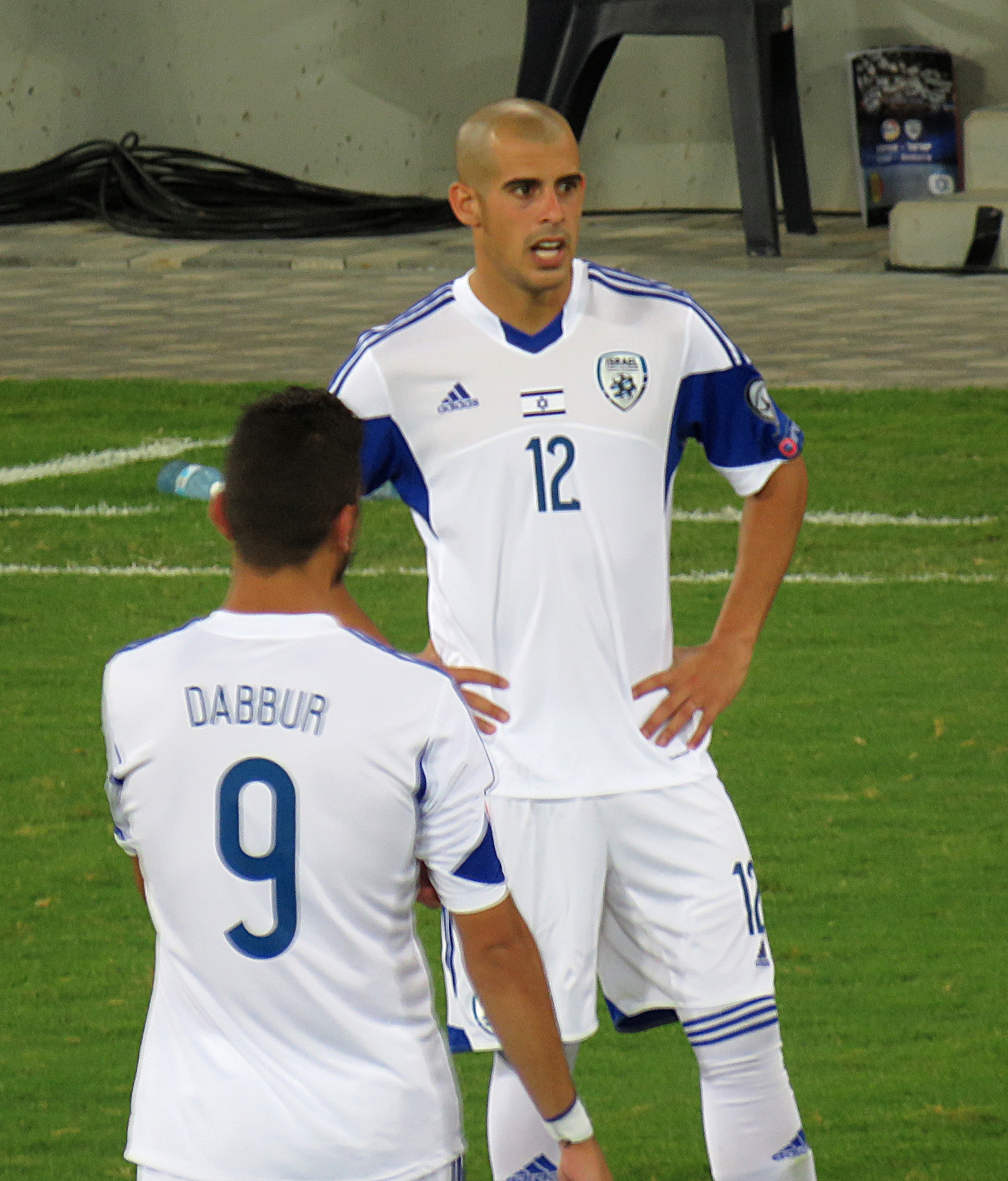
Tal Ben Haim with Israel vs Andorra September 3, 2015

Ben Haim made his debut for the national team on 29 March 2011 in a UEFA Euro 2012 qualifying match against Georgia. In that match he also scored his first goal for the team, which appeared to be the winning goal, just six minutes after he was substituted into the game.

== Personal life ==
He has exactly the same name as central defender Tal Ben Haim, who also played for Israel and Maccabi Tel Aviv, and he is referred to in UEFA reports as Tal Ben Haim II or Tal Ben Haim Junior (because he is younger), and wears a jersey with his surname spelled as Ben Chaim to distinguish him from his fellow countryman. Ben Haim II and Ben Haim were also teammates for both Maccabi Tel Aviv and the national team.

== Career statistics ==
=== Club ===
As of 1 June 2023

Club	Season	League			Cup (Note: Includes Israel State Cup)		League Cup (Note: Includes Toto Cup)		Europe		Total	
Club	Season	Division	Apps	Goals	Apps	Goals	Apps	Goals	Apps	Goals	Apps	Goals
Maccabi Petah Tikva	2006–07	Israeli Premier League	—		—		1	0	—		1	0
Maccabi Petah Tikva	2007–08	Israeli Premier League	5	1	—		—		—		5	1
Maccabi Petah Tikva	2008–09	Israeli Premier League	24	0	1	0	1	0	—		26	0
Maccabi Petah Tikva	2009–10	Israeli Premier League	29	9	3	1	3	0	—		35	10
Maccabi Petah Tikva	2010–11	Israeli Premier League	30	10	1	0	7	3	—		38	13
Maccabi Petah Tikva	2011–12	Israeli Premier League	34	9	3	1	3	2	—		40	12
Maccabi Petah Tikva	Total		122	29	8	2	15	5	0	0	145	36
Hapoel Tel Aviv	2012–13	Israeli Premier League	30	7	1	0	3	2	7	1	41	10
Hapoel Tel Aviv	Total		30	7	1	0	3	2	7	1	41	10
Maccabi Tel Aviv	2013–14	Israeli Premier League	29	4	1	0	—		9	1	39	5
Maccabi Tel Aviv	2014–15	Israeli Premier League	30	7	3	0	6	2	6	2	45	11
Maccabi Tel Aviv	2015–16	Israeli Premier League	31	8	3	1	1	1	12	1	47	11
Maccabi Tel Aviv	2016–17	Israeli Premier League	29	15	5	1	3	0	12	3	49	19
Maccabi Tel Aviv	Total		119	34	12	2	12	3	39	7	182	46
Sparta Prague	2017–18	Czech First League	18	0	1	0	0	0	2	0	21	0
Sparta Prague	2018–19	Czech First League	2	0	0	0	0	0	0	0	2	0
Sparta Prague	2019–20	Czech First League	0	0	0	0	0	0	0	0	0	0
Sparta Prague	Total		20	0	1	0	0	0	2	0	23	0
Maccabi Tel Aviv	2020–21	Israeli Premier League	28	2	4	1	1	0	8	0	41	3
Maccabi Tel Aviv	2021–22	Israeli Premier League	23	5	3	0	0	0	8	0	34	5
Maccabi Tel Aviv	Total		51	7	7	1	1	0	16	0	75	8
Maccabi Petah Tikva	2022–23	Liga Leumit	28	12	4	0	2	0	0	0	34	12
Maccabi Petah Tikva	2023–24	Israeli Premier League	0	0	0	0	0	0	0	0	0	0
Maccabi Petah Tikva	Total		28	12	4	0	2	0	0	0	34	12
Career Total			370	89	32	6	33	10	64	8	498	112

=== International ===
As of 9 October 2016

National team	Year	Apps	Goals
Israel
Israel	2011	3	1
Israel	2013	2	0
Israel	2014	5	1
Israel	2015	7	1
Israel	2016	5	2
Total		22	5

==== International goals ====
As of match played 9 October 2016. Israel score listed first, score column indicates score after each Ben Haim goal.

International goals by date, venue, cap, opponent, score, result and competition
No.	Date	Venue	Cap	Opponent	Score	Result	Competition
1	6 September 2011	Bloomfield Stadium, Tel Aviv, Israel	1	Georgia	1–0	1–0	UEFA Euro 2012 qualifying
2	10 October 2014	GSP Stadium, Nicosia, Cyprus	8	Cyprus	2–0	2–1	UEFA Euro 2016 qualifying
3	12 June 2015	Bilino Polje Stadium, Zenica, Bosnia and Herzegovina	13	Bosnia and Herzegovina	1–0	1–3	UEFA Euro 2016 qualifying
4	5 September 2016	Sammy Ofer Stadium, Haifa, Israel	20	Italy	1–2	1–3	2018 FIFA World Cup qualification
5	6 October 2016	Philip II Arena, Skopje, Macedonia	21	Macedonia	2–0	2–1	2018 FIFA World Cup qualification

== Honours ==
Maccabi Tel Aviv

- Israeli Premier League (2): 2012–13, 2013–14
- Israel State Cup (1): 2014–15
- Toto Cup (2): 2014–15, 2020-21
- Israel Super Cup (1): 2020
