= Ben Dayan =

Ben Dayan is a surname. Notable people with the surname include:

- Ali Ben Dayan (born 1943), Moroccan footballer
- Dedi Ben Dayan (born 1978), Israeli footballer
- Ortal Ben Dayan (born 1981), media personality, sociologist, and blogger

== See also ==
- Bendayan
