= Omri Ben Harush =

Israeli footballer

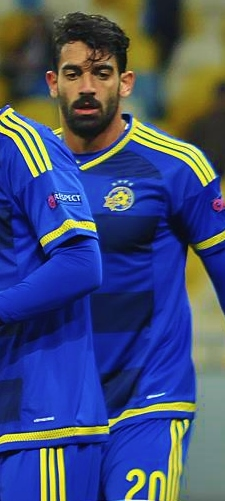
- Ben Harush playing in 2016

Personal information
- Full name: Omri Ben Harush
- Date of birth: 7 March 1990 (age 36)
- Place of birth: Netanya, Israel
- Height: 1.85 m (6 ft 1 in)
- Positions: Centre-back; left-back

Team information
- Current team: Hapoel Nir Ramat HaSharon

Youth career
- 1998–2010: Maccabi Netanya

Senior career*
Years	Team	Apps	(Gls)
2009–2013	Maccabi Netanya	104	(4)
2013–2017	Maccabi Tel Aviv	86	(4)
2017–2018	Maccabi Haifa	25	(3)
2018–2020	Lokeren	32	(1)
2020–2021	F.C. Ashdod	16	(0)
2021–2022	Bnei Sakhnin	16	(0)
2022–2023	Sektzia Ness Ziona	15	(1)
2023–2024	Hapoel Kfar Saba	15	(0)
2024–2025	F.C. Ashdod	32	(0)
2025–2026	Hapoel Kfar Shalem	16	(1)
2026–	Hapoel Nir Ramat HaSharon	5	(0)

International career
2008	Israel U19	10	(0)
2010–2013	Israel U21	21	(0)
2011–2019	Israel	27	(0)
- * Club domestic league appearances and goals as of 27 March 2026

Omri Ben Harush (or Ben Harosh, Hebrew: עומרי בן הרוש; born 7 March 1990) is an Israeli professional footballer who plays as a left back defender for Hapoel Nir Ramat HaSharon and for the Israel national team.

== Early life ==
Ben-Harush was born in Netanya, Israel, to a family of Sephardic Jewish descent.

== Club career ==
=== Maccabi Netanya ===
Ben Harush joined Maccabi Netanya youth team when he was eight years old. He made his debut for the club on 3 August 2009 against Beitar Jerusalem.

In four seasons with Netanya he managed to play 125 games, score six goals and also provided three assists in all club competitions.

=== Maccabi Tel Aviv ===
On 11 July 2013, after four years in the senior side of Netanya, he moved to Maccabi Tel Aviv for a fee of $558,000. Omri signed a three-year contract with Tel Aviv. He made his debut for the club on 30 July 2013 in an away Champions League match against Basel. Ben Harush started the season well, after giving a chance in the first team line-up due to an injury of Maccabi's original left-back, Mané. He was lined-up in the historic 3–0 away win in Kiryat Eliezer Stadium against Maccabi Haifa on the third matchday of the Israeli Premier League, after Maccabi had failed to win there for more than nine years. His performances for Maccabi at the start of the season granted him a newly call for the national team, and he was lined-up in the away match against Portugal on 11 October 2013. He scored his debut goal for the club during the away match on 23 November 2013, against Hapoel Haifa.

== International career ==
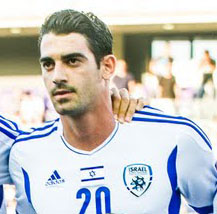
Ben Harush during the 2013 UEFA European Under-21 Championship that was hosted in Israel

Ben Harush made his debut for the national team against Greece on 2 September 2011 in the Euro 2012 Qualifiers. He later took part in the World cup 2014 qualification away match against Portugal on 11 October 2013.

== Career statistics ==
=== Club ===
As of 1 June 2018

Club	Season	League			Cup			League Cup			Europe			Total		
Club	Season	Apps	Goals	Assists	Apps	Goals	Assists	Apps	Goals	Assists	Apps	Goals	Assists	Apps	Goals	Assists
Maccabi Netanya	2009–10	14	2	0	1	0	0	1	0	0	0	0	0	16	2	0
Maccabi Netanya	2010–11	26	0	0	4	0	0	5	1	0	0	0	0	35	1	0
Maccabi Netanya	2012–12	35	1	1	3	0	0	3	0	1	0	0	0	41	1	2
Maccabi Netanya	2012–13	29	1	1	1	0	0	3	1	0	0	0	0	33	2	1
Maccabi Tel Aviv	2013–14	27	1	1	0	0	0	0	0	0	9	0	1	28	1	2
Maccabi Tel Aviv	2014–15	28	2	0	3	0	0	6	2	0	5	0	0	42	4	0
Maccabi Tel Aviv	2015–16	19	1	0	2	0	0	3	0	0	10	0	0	34	1	0
Maccabi Tel Aviv	2016–17	12	0	0	2	0	0	3	0	0	9	0	0	26	0	0
Maccabi Haifa	2017–18	17	3	0	3	0	0	5	0	0	0	0	0	25	3	0
Career total		208	11	3	19	0	0	29	4	1	33	0	1	280	15	5

== Honours ==
Maccabi Tel Aviv

- Israeli Premier League: 2013–14, 2014–15
- Israel State Cup: 2014-2015
- Toto Cup: 2014-2015
