= 2014–15 Toto Cup Al =

Tournament details
- Country: Israel
- Teams: 14

Final positions
- Champions: Maccabi Tel Aviv
- Runners-up: Maccabi Haifa

Tournament statistics
- Matches played: 37
- Goals scored: 89 (2.41 per match)
- Top goal scorer(s): (Israel) Mohammad Ghadir (Israel) Murad Abu Anza (Spain) Rubén Rayos (4)

The 2014–15 Toto Cup Al was the 30th season of the third-important football tournament in Israel since its introduction and the 10th tournament involving Israeli Premier League clubs only. The tournament resumed after the planned competition for the previous season was cancelled.

The competition was held in two stages. First, fourteen Premier League teams were divided into three groups, five teams in groups A and C and four teams in group B, the teams playing against each other once. The best 3 teams from groups A and C and the best 2 teams from group B advanced to the quarter-finals, which was played over two legged ties. The semi-finals and the final were played as one-legged matches in a neutral venue.

The tournament was due to start on 2 August 2014, however the opening date was postponed because of the 2014 Israel–Gaza conflict. The tournament eventually started on 12 August 2014.

Hapoel Haifa were the defending champions, after winning the previous competition. who made it their second Toto Cup Al title overall. In the final, played on 31 December 2014, Maccabi Tel Aviv had beaten Maccabi Haifa 2–1. This cup was the first title gained by Maccabi Tel Aviv this season, and was followed by the State Cup and the league title, to complete its domestic treble.

== Group stage ==
The draw took place on 26 June 2014.

The matches were due to start on 26 July 2014, however delays occurred by the 2014 Israel-Gaza conflict caused the matches to start on 12 August 2014.

=== Group A ===
Pos	Team	Pld	W	D	L	GF	GA	GD	Pts	MHA	BnS	HHA	IKS	HAC
1	Maccabi Haifa (A)	4	3	0	1	5	3	+2	9			2–0		2–1
2	Bnei Sakhnin (A)	4	2	2	0	8	5	+3	8	2–0			1–1	
3	Hapoel Haifa (A)	4	2	1	1	7	5	+2	7		2–2			2–0
4	Ironi Kiryat Shmona	4	0	2	2	2	3	−1	2	0–1		3–1		
5	Hapoel Acre	4	0	1	3	4	8	−4	1		2–3		1–1	

Source: football.org.il (in Hebrew)
Rules for classification: 1st points; 2nd goal difference; 3rd matches won; 4th goals scored; 5th head-to-head; 6th decision match
(A) Advanced to the quarterfinals

=== Group B ===
Pos	Team	Pld	W	D	L	GF	GA	GD	Pts	MTA	HTA	HRA	MNE
1	Maccabi Tel Aviv (A)	3	2	1	0	3	0	+3	7			2–0	
2	Hapoel Tel Aviv (A)	3	1	1	1	2	1	+1	4	1–0		0–0	
3	Hapoel Ra'anana	3	1	1	1	1	2	−1	4				1–0
4	Maccabi Netanya	3	0	1	2	0	3	−3	1	0–0	0–2		

Source: football.org.il (in Hebrew)
Rules for classification: 1st points; 2nd goal difference; 3rd matches won; 4th goals scored; 5th head-to-head; 6th decision match
(A) Advanced to the quarterfinals

=== Group C ===
Pos	Team	Pld	W	D	L	GF	GA	GD	Pts	HPT	ASH	MPT	BEI	HBS
1	Hapoel Petah Tikva (A)	4	2	1	1	7	3	+4	7		4–0			1–1
2	F.C. Ironi Ashdod (A)	4	2	1	1	5	5	0	7				1–0	1–1
3	Maccabi Petah Tikva (A)	4	1	2	1	1	3	−2	5	1–0	0–3			
4	Beitar Jerusalem	4	1	1	2	4	3	+1	4	1–2		0–0		
5	Hapoel Be'er Sheva	4	0	3	1	2	5	−3	3			0–0	0–3	

Source: football.org.il (in Hebrew)
Rules for classification: 1st points; 2nd goal difference; 3rd matches won; 4th goals scored; 5th head-to-head; 6th decision match
(A) Advanced to the quarterfinals

== Knockout rounds ==
The quarter finals draw was held on 3 September, although the third qualifying club from Group C was still undetermined.

=== Quarterfinals ===
Team 1	Agg.	Team 2	1st leg	2nd leg
Maccabi Tel Aviv	8–0	Hapoel Petah Tikva	6–0	2–0
Bnei Sakhnin	4–6	Maccabi Haifa	1–1	3–5
F.C. Ashdod	4–1	Hapoel Tel Aviv	2–0	2–1
Maccabi Petah Tikva	2–4	Hapoel Haifa	1–2	1–2

==== First leg ====
6 September 2014	Bnei Sakhnin	1–1	Maccabi Haifa	Sakhnin
20:30	Mugrabi 60'	Report (Hebrew)	Cocalić 67'	Stadium: Doha Stadium; Attendance: 2,000; Referee: Erez Papier

7 September 2014	Maccabi Petah Tikva	1–2	Hapoel Haifa	Petah Tikva
20:30	Hazurov 28'	Report (Hebrew)	Lala 16', 25'	Stadium: HaMoshava Stadium; Attendance: 350; Referee: Ziv Adler

9 September 2014	F.C. Ashdod	2–0	Hapoel Tel Aviv	Ashdod
20:00	Siroshtein 60'; Avitan 83'	Report (Hebrew)		Stadium: Yud-Alef Stadium; Attendance: 1,000; Referee: Menashe Mashiah

10 September 2014	Maccabi Tel Aviv	6–0	Hapoel Petah Tikva	Tel Aviv
20:30	Margulies 5'; Tibi 17'; Ben Harush 22'; Zahavi 25'; Ben Basat 52' (pen.); Peretz 63'	Report (Hebrew)		Stadium: Bloomfield Stadium; Attendance: 8,242; Referee: Daniel Bar-Natan

==== Second leg ====
10 September 2014	Maccabi Haifa	5–3	Bnei Sakhnin	Netanya
20:15	Abuhatzira 2'; Idrissou 22', 50'; Rayos 86'; Vered 90+3'	Report (Hebrew)	Ghadir 5', 47'; Paz 64'	Stadium: Netanya Stadium; Attendance: 1,500; Referee: Eitan Shmuelevich

Maccabi Haifa won 6–4 on aggregate.

10 September 2014	Hapoel Haifa	2–1	Maccabi Petah Tikva	Haifa
20:20	Ostvind 40'; Kalonas 90'	Report (Hebrew)	Shemesh 47'	Stadium: Sammy Ofer Stadium; Attendance: 2,500; Referee: Eli Hachmon

Hapoel Haifa won 4–2 on aggregate.

17 September 2014	Hapoel Petah Tikva	0–2	Maccabi Tel Aviv	Petah Tikva
19:45		Report (Hebrew)	Ben Harush 23'; Reichert 47'	Stadium: HaMoshava Stadium; Attendance: 300; Referee: Gal Leibowitz

Maccabi Tel Aviv won 8–0 on aggregate.

23 September 2014	Hapoel Tel Aviv	1–2	F.C. Ashdod	Tel Aviv
20:30	Abutbul (red card) 26'; Abu Alhija 57'	Report (Hebrew)	Abu Anza 30', 40'	Stadium: Bloomfield Stadium; Attendance: 1,500; Referee: Guy Berger

F.C. Ashdod won 4–1 on aggregate.

=== Semifinals ===
17 December 2014	Maccabi Haifa	3 – 1	F.C. Ashdod	Netanya
	Rayo 4'; Ezra 19'; Turgeman 59'		Abu Anza 90+1'	Stadium: Netanya Stadium

17 December 2014	Maccabi Tel Aviv	1 – 0	Hapoel Haifa	Petah Tikva
	Ben Haim 13'			Stadium: HaMoshava Stadium

=== Final ===
31 December 2014	Maccabi Tel Aviv	2–1	Maccabi Haifa	Netanya
19:30	Ohayon 47' (o.g.); Mitrović 84' (pen.)	Report	Tibi 53' (o.g.)	Stadium: Netanya Stadium; Referee: Menashe Mashiach

== See also ==
- 2014–15 Toto Cup Leumit
- 2014–15 Israeli Premier League
- 2014–15 Israel State Cup
