= 2014–15 Israel State Cup =

Tournament details
- Country: Israel
- Teams: 151

Final positions
- Champions: Maccabi Tel Aviv
- Runners-up: Hapoel Be'er Sheva

Tournament statistics
- Matches played: 160
- Goals scored: 531 (3.32 per match)
- Top goal scorer(s): Eran Zeger (F.C. Be'er Sheva); Ben Dayan (A.S. Holon/Hapoel Kiryat Shalom) (7 goals)

The 2014–15 Israel State Cup (Hebrew: גביע המדינה, Gvia HaMedina) was the 76th season of Israel's nationwide football cup competition and the 61st after the Israeli Declaration of Independence.

The competition began on 10 September 2014, with a fifth-round match between Hapoel Katamon and Hapoel Migdal HaEmek. The final was held in Sammy Ofer Stadium, Haifa on 20 May 2015.

The competition was won by Maccabi Tel Aviv, who had beaten Hapoel Be'er Sheva 6–2 in the final.

== Format changes ==
On 2 July 2014 the IFA approved a change of format so that the quarter-finals would be played as two-legged, home and away ties.

== Preliminary rounds ==
=== First to fourth rounds ===
Rounds 1 to 4 double as league cup competition for each division in Liga Bet and Liga Gimel. The two third-round winners from each Liga Bet division and the fourth-round winner from each Liga Gimel division advance to the sixth round.

==== Liga Bet ====
===== Liga Bet North A =====
Home team	Score	Away team
First Round
F.C. Ahva Kafr Manda	1–1 (a.e.t.) (4–2 p.)	Maccabi Ironi Acre
Hapoel Kafr Kanna	w/o	Hapoel Ironi Safed
Ahva Arraba	w/o	Hapoel Shefa-'Amr
Hapoel Bnei I'billin	1–0	Hapoel Bnei Maghar
Second Round
F.C. Ahva Kafr Manda	0–5	Hapoel Kafr Kanna
Ahva Arraba	3–1	Hapoel Bnei I'billin
Ironi Bnei Kabul	0–2	Ahi Acre
F.C. al-Nahda Nazareth	1–3	Beitar Haifa
Third Round
Ahi Acre	2–4	Hapoel Kafr Kanna
Ahva Arraba	3–0	Beitar Haifa
Fourth Round
Ahva Arraba	0–2	Hapoel Kafr Kanna

Hapoel Kafr Kanna won the district cup; Hapoel Kafr Kanna and Ahva Arraba qualified to the sixth round.

===== Liga Bet North B =====
Home team	Score	Away team
First Round
Hapoel Umm al-Fahm	w/o	Hapoel Daliyat al-Karmel
Hapoel Baqa Ironi al-Gharbiyye	2–1 (a.e.t.)	Maccabi Ein Mahil
Ihud Bnei Kafr Qara	w/o	F.C. Tzeiri Tur'an
Second Round
Hap. Ramot Menashe Megiddo	2–3	Hapoel Daliyat al-Karmel
Hapoel Sandala Gilboa	w/o	Hapoel Iksal
Maccabi Ahi Iksal	w/o	Hapoel Ironi Baqa al-Gharbiyye
F.C. Pardes Hanna-Karkur	0–1	Ihud Bnei Kafr Qara
Third Round
Hapoel Baqa Ironi al-Gharbiyye	4–2 (a.e.t.)	Hapoel Iksal
Hapoel Daliyat al-Karmel	0–0 (a.e.t.) (9–8 p.)	Ihud Bnei Kafr Qara
Fourth Round
Hapoel Baqa Ironi al-Gharbiyye	1–1 (a.e.t.) (5–3 p.)	Hapoel Daliyat al-Karmel

Hapoel Baqa Ironi al-Gharbiyye won the district cup; Hapoel D. al-Karmel and Hapoel Baqa Ironi al-Gharbiyye qualified to the sixth round.

===== Liga Bet South A =====
Home team	Score	Away team
First Round
Beitar Ramat Gan	2–2 (a.e.t.) (1–3 p.)	Beitar Petah Tikva
Hapoel Bik'at HaYarden	2–1	Hapoel Kafr Qasim Shouaa
Otzma F.C. Holon	0–1	F.C. Roei Heshbon Tel Aviv
F.C. Tzeirei Tayibe	2–1 (a.e.t.)	Maccabi Bnei Jaljulia
Hapoel Kiryat Ono	1–0	F.C. Ironi Or Yehuda
Hapoel Nahlat Yehuda	4–0	Hapoel Ramat Israel
Second Round
Hapoel Tzafririm Holon	3–0	F.C. Roei Heshbon Tel Aviv
F.C. Tira	1–3	F.C. Tzeirei Tayibe
Hapoel Kiryat Ono	1–2 (a.e.t.)	Beitar Petah Tikva
Hapoel Nahlat Yehuda	3–1	Hapoel Bik'at HaYarden
Third Round
Hapoel Tzafririm Holon	1–3	Hapoel Nahlat Yehuda
Beitar Petah Tikva	3–1	F.C. Tzeirei Tayibe
Fourth Round
Hapoel Nahlat Yehuda	1–0	Beitar Petah Tikva

Hapoel Nahlat Yehuda won the district cup; Hapoel Nahlat Yehuda and Beitar Petah Tikva qualified to the sixth round.

===== Liga Bet South B =====
Home team	Score	Away team
First Round
A.S. Holon	2–7	F.C. Be'er Sheva
Beitar Ma'ale Adumim	1–1 (a.e.t.) (3–4 p.)	Ironi Beit Shemesh
Beitar Yavne	0–2	Beitar Giv'at Ze'ev
F.C. Dimona	w/o	Bnei Eilat
Hapoel Arad	w/o	Hapoel Rahat
Hapoel Merhavim	w/o	Bnei Yichalel Rehovot
Ironi Modi'in	w/o	F.C. Bnei Ra'anana
Maccabi Netivot	3–0	Moadon Tzeirei Rahat
Second Round
F.C. Be'er Sheva	5–2	Beitar Giv'at Ze'ev
Maccabi Netivot	2–0	Ironi Modi'in
Hapoel Rahat	1–0	Bnei Yichalel Rehovot
Bnei Eilat	6–0	Ironi Beit Shemesh
Third Round
Maccabi Netivot	1–3	F.C. Be'er Sheva
Bnei Eilat	3–1	Hapoel Rahat
Fourth Round
F.C. Be'er Sheva	1–4	Bnei Eilat

Bnei Eilat won the district cup; F.C. Be'er Sheva and Bnei Eilat qualified to the sixth round.

==== Liga Gimel ====
===== Liga Gimel Upper Galilee =====
Home team	Score	Away team
First Round
	–	
Second Round
	–	
Third Round
	–	
Fourth Round
Maccabi Bnei Nahf	5–1	Hapoel Bnei Hurfeish

Maccabi Bnei Nahf won the district cup and qualified to the sixth round.

===== Liga Gimel Lower Galilee =====
Home team	Score	Away team
First Round
	–	
Second Round
	–	
Third Round
F.C. Tzeirei Kafr Kanna	2–3	F.C. Tzeirei Tamra
F.C. Halat al-Sharif	w/o	F.C. Tzeirei Bir al-Maksur
Fourth Round
F.C. Tzeirei Tamra	1–1 (a.e.t.) (3–1 p.)	F.C. Tzeirei Bir al-Maksur

F.C. Tzeirei Tamra won the district cup and qualified to the sixth round.

===== Liga Gimel Jezreel =====
Home team	Score	Away team
First Round
	–	
Second Round
Hapoel Bnei Ar'ara 'Ara	0–3	Ihud Bnei Baqa
Hapoel al-Ittihad Nazareth	0–4	Beitar Afula
Maccabi Isfiya	2–1	Hapoel Bnei Zalafa
Third Round
Ihud Bnei Baqa	2–0	Beitar Afula
Hapoel Bnei Nazareth	w/o	Maccabi Isfiya
Fourth Round
Maccabi Isfiya	3–4	Ihud Bnei Baqa

Ihud Bnei Baqa won the district cup and qualified to the sixth round.

===== Liga Gimel Shomron =====
Home team	Score	Away team
First Round
	–	
Second Round
Hapoel Tirat HaCarmel	0–3	F.C. Haifa
Third Round
Beitar Hadera	w/o	F.C. Haifa
Fourth Round
Hapoel Ahva Haifa	2–4	F.C. Haifa

F.C. Haifa won the district cup and qualified to the sixth round.

===== Liga Gimel Sharon =====
Home team	Score	Away team
First Round
Hapoel Oranit	3–3 (a.e.t.) (3–2 p.)	Shimshon Kafr Qasim
Second Round
F.C. Netanya	1–3	Hapoel Aliyah Kfar Saba
Hapoel Oranit	0–5	Hapoel Pardesiya
Maccabi HaSharon Netanya	1–2 (a.e.t.)	Beitar Ariel
Beitar Tubruk	2–1	F.C. Kafr Qasim Nibras
Third Round
Hapoel Pardesiya	2–1	Hapoel Aliyah Kfar Saba
Beitar Ariel	1–1 (a.e.t.) (2–4 p.)	Beitar Tubruk
Fourth Round
Hapoel Pardesiya	1–2	Beitar Tubruk

Beitar Tubruk won the district cup and qualified to the sixth round.

===== Liga Gimel Tel Aviv =====
Home team	Score	Away team
First Round
Bnei Yehud	2–1	Elitzur Jaffa Tel Aviv
Hapoel Abirei Bat Yam	1–2	F.C. Mahanaim Ramat Gan
Hapoel Neve Golan	w/o	Beitar Ezra
Ironi Beit Dagan	0–5	Shikun Vatikim Ramat Gan
Maccabi HaShikma Hen	w/o	Beitar Jaffa
Maccabi Spartak Ramat Gan	1–2	Maccabi Ironi Or Yehuda
Second Round
Hapoel Kiryat Shalom	3–1	Maccabi Ironi Or Yehuda
Elizur Yehud	w/o	Hapoel Neve Golan
F.C. Mahanaim Ramat Gan	2–0	Shikun Vatikim Ramat Gan
Bnei Yehud	1–2	Beitar Jaffa
Third Round
F.C. Mahanaim Ramat Gan	2–4	Hapoel Neve Golan
Beitar Jaffa	2–5	Hapoel Kiryat Shalom
Fourth Round
Hapoel Kiryat Shalom	3–1	Hapoel Neve Golan

Hapoel Kiryat Shalom won the district cup and qualified to the sixth round.

===== Liga Gimel Center =====
Home team	Score	Away team
First Round
Hapoel F.C. Hevel Modi'in	0–2	Hapoel Gedera
Second Round
F.C. Holon	2–1	Hapoel Tirat Shalom
Hapoel Matzliah	1–3	Hapoel Mevaseret Zion
Maccabi Kiryat Ekron	3–2 (a.e.t.)	Hapoel Gedera
Ironi Lod	5–1	Hapoel Ramla
Third Round
F.C. Holon	4–1	Ironi Lod
Maccabi Kiryat Ekron	6–1	Hapoel Mevaseret Zion
Fourth Round
Maccabi Kiryat Ekron	1–2	F.C. Holon

F.C.Holon won the district cup and qualified to the sixth round.

===== Liga Gimel South =====
Home team	Score	Away team
First Round
	–	
Second Round
Maccabi Ironi Hura	w/o	F.C. Hapoel Yeruham
Hapoel Tel Sheva	w/o	Elizur Ironi Yehuda
Bnei al-Salam Rahat	0–1	Maccabi Segev Shalom
Third Round
F.C. Hapoel Yeruham	awarded (Note: The IFA awarded the match to F.C. Hapoel Yeruham, as Hapoel Tel Sheva fielded an ineligible player, Aref el-Assem. The match originally ended 0–4 to Hapoel Tel Sheva.)	Hapoel Tel Sheva
Hapoel Tzeirei al-Mahdi	2–3	Maccabi Segev Shalom
Fourth Round
F.C. Hapoel Yeruham	4–3	Maccabi Segev Shalom

F.C. Hapoel Yeruham won the district cup and qualified to the sixth round.

=== Fifth Round ===
The fifth round is played within each division of Liga Alef. The winners qualify to the sixth round

Home team	Score	Away team
Liga Alef North
Hapoel Katamon	0–1 (a.e.t.)	Hapoel Migdal HaEmek
F.C. Karmiel Safed	1–1 (a.e.t.) (3–4 p.)	F.C. Givat Olga
Maccabi Sektzia Ma'alot-Tarshiha	1–0	Hapoel Herzliya
Hapoel Hadera	1–1 (a.e.t.) (5–6 p.)	Hapoel Beit She'an
Maccabi Tzur Shalom	3–1 (a.e.t.)	Maccabi Umm al-Fahm
Ihud Bnei Majd al-Krum	1–2 (a.e.t.)	Maccabi Kiryat Ata
Ironi Nesher	2–3 (a.e.t.)	Hapoel Asi Gilboa
Beitar Nahariya	1–1 (a.e.t.) (1–4 p.)	Maccabi Daliyat al-Karmel
Liga Alef South
Hapoel Azor	3–2	Maccabi Be'er Sheva
Hapoel Mahane Yehuda	1–5	Maccabi Kabilio Jaffa
Maccabi Sha'arayim	1–0 (a.e.t.)	Maccabi Kiryat Malakhi
Hapoel Morasha	0–3	F.C. Shikun HaMizrah
F.C. Kafr Qasim	2–0 (a.e.t.)	Sektzia Nes Tziona
Hapoel Hod HaSharon	1–5	Hapoel Marmorek
Hapoel Kfar Shalem	3–2 (a.e.t.)	Amishav Petah Tikva
Beitar Kfar Saba	0–2	Hapoel Ashkelon

== Nationwide rounds ==
=== Sixth round ===
Home team	Score	Away team
Hapoel Kiryat Shalom	2–3	F.C. Shikun HaMizrach
Bnei Eilat	2–0 (a.e.t.)	Hapoel Azor
F.C. Hapoel Yeruham	0–3	Hapoel Ashkelon
Hapoel Kfar Shalem	0–2	F.C. Be'er Sheva
Hapoel Beit She'an	1–0	Ahva Arraba
Maccabi Tzur Shalom	1–0	Maccabi Bnei Nahf
Maccabi Sha'arayim	0–0 (a.e.t.) (0–3 p.)	F.C. Holon
Maccabi Sektzia Ma'alot-Tarshiha	6–2 (a.e.t.)	Hapoel Daliyat al-Karmel
Hapoel Kafr Kanna	0–1	F.C. Givat Olga
Maccabi Ironi Kiryat Ata	0–1	Hapoel Migdal HaEmek
Beitar Tubruk	1–1 (a.e.t.) (4–2 p.)	Hapoel Nahlat Yehuda
Ihud Bnei Baqa	1–2	Hapoel Asi Gilboa
Maccabi Daliyat al-Karmel	3–1	F.C. Tzeirei Tamra
Hapoel Marmorek	4–0	Beitar Petah Tikva
F.C. Haifa	1–1 (a.e.t.) (6–7 p.)	Hapoel Ironi Baqa al-Gharbiyye
F.C. Kafr Qasim	1–2	Maccabi Kabilio Jaffa

=== Seventh round ===
Home team	Score	Away team
Bnei Eilat	1–0	Maccabi Kiryat Gat
Hapoel Ironi Baqa al-Gharbiyye	1–3	Maccabi Sektzia Ma'alot-Tarshiha
Hapoel Asi Gilboa	4–4 (a.e.t.) (3–5 p)	F.C. Holon
Hapoel Marmorek	0–0 (a.e.t.) (4–3 p)	Hapoel Beit She'an
Hapoel Migdal HaEmek	3–1	Maccabi Daliyat al-Karmel
F.C. Shikun HaMizrah	1–0	F.C. Be'er Sheva
Hapoel Bnei Lod	1–0	Hakoah Amidar Ramat Gan
Maccabi Herzliya	5–0	Beitar Tubruk
Hapoel Ramat Gan	1–1 (a.e.t.) (8–9 p)	F.C. Givat Olga
Ironi Tiberias	2–2 (a.e.t.) (2–4 p)	Hapoel Kfar Saba
Maccabi Ahi Nazareth	2–0	Hapoel Jerusalem
Bnei Yehuda Tel Aviv	7–0	Maccabi Tzur Shalom
Hapoel Nir Ramat HaSharon	3–0	Hapoel Nazareth Illit
Maccabi Kabilio Jaffa	1–3	Hapoel Ashkelon

Byes: Beitar Tel Aviv Ramla, Hapoel Afula, Hapoel Rishon LeZion, Maccabi Yavne.

=== Eighth round ===
Home team	Score	Away team
F.C. Shikun HaMizrah	1–0	Hapoel Migdal HaEmek
Hapoel Ashkelon	3–3 (a.e.t.) (3–1 p)	Beitar Jerusalem
F.C. Givat Olga	1–2	Maccabi Petah Tikva
Hapoel Marmorek	0–3	Hapoel Afula
Beitar Tel Aviv Ramla	1–4	Maccabi Tel Aviv
Hapoel Nir Ramat HaSharon	1–3 (a.e.t.)	Maccabi Haifa
Hapoel Rishon LeZion	1–2	Hapoel Tel Aviv
Maccabi Herzliya	0–1	Hapoel Be'er Sheva
Hapoel Acre	0–2	Hapoel Ironi Kiryat Shmona
Maccabi Yavne	1–0	Bnei Sakhnin
F.C. Holon	1–4	Maccabi Sektzia Ma'alot-Tarshiha
Bnei Eilat	1–2	Hapoel Kfar Saba
Hapoel Ra'anana	2–1	Bnei Yehuda Tel Aviv
Hapoel Petah Tikva	2–1	Hapoel Bnei Lod
Maccabi Ahi Nazareth	3–1	Maccabi Netanya
Hapoel Haifa	0–0 (a.e.t.) (2–4 p)	F.C. Ashdod

=== Round of 16 ===
Home team	Score	Away team
Hapoel Tel Aviv	0–2	Hapoel Kfar Saba
Maccabi Tel Aviv	1–0	Hapoel Ashkelon
Maccabi Haifa	1–1 (a.e.t.) (1–3 p)	Hapoel Ironi Kiryat Shmona
Maccabi Petah Tikva	1–0	Hapoel Petah Tikva
Hapoel Ra'anana	0–1 (a.e.t.)	Hapoel Be'er Sheva
Hapoel Afula	3–0	Maccabi Sektzia Ma'alot-Tarshiha
Maccabi Yavne	5–1	F.C. Shikun HaMizrah
Maccabi Ahi Nazareth	2–1	F.C. Ashdod

=== Quarter-finals ===
Team 1	Agg.	Team 2	1st leg	2nd leg
Hapoel Kfar Saba	1–2	Maccabi Ahi Nazareth	1–1	0–1
Hapoel Afula	2–2 (a)	Maccabi Petah Tikva	0–0	2–2
Maccabi Yavne	1–4	Hapoel Be'er Sheva	0–3	1–1
Hapoel Ironi Kiryat Shmona	1–4	Maccabi Tel Aviv	1–1	0–3

=== Semi-finals ===
29 April 2015	Hapoel Afula	0–7	Hapoel Be'er Sheva	Jerusalem
18:00 (IDT)		Summary; Report (Hebrew)	Gabay 3', 67', 80'; Arbeitman 7', 30'; Melikson 44'; Iluz 70'	Stadium: Teddy Stadium; Attendance: 10,000; Referee: Liran Wachsberger

29 April 2015	Maccabi Tel Aviv	3–0	Maccabi Ahi Nazareth	Jerusalem
20:42 (IDT)	Zahavi 2'; Prica 82'; Mitrović 89'	Summary; Report (Hebrew)		Stadium: Teddy Stadium; Referee: Roi Reinshreiber

=== Final ===
20 May 2015	Hapoel Be'er Sheva	2–6	Maccabi Tel Aviv	Haifa
20:30 (IDT)	Hoban 34'; Buzaglo 57'	Summary; Report (Hebrew)	Prica 21', 47', 52'; Ziv 28'; Zahavi 58'; Radi 62'	Stadium: Sammy Ofer Stadium; Attendance: 30,000; Referee: Ziv Adler

== Top scorers ==
Rank	Player	Club	Goals
1	(Israel) Eran Zeger	F.C. Be'er Sheva	7
1	(Israel) Ben Dayan	A.S. Holon/Hapoel Kiryat Shalom	7
3	(Israel) David Bachar	Hapoel Nahlat Yehuda	5
3	(Israel) Kfir Leibovich	F.C. Haifa	5
3	(Israel) Ido Exbard	Maccabi Ahi Nazareth	5
3	(Israel) Eran Zahavi	Maccabi Tel Aviv	5
3	(Israel) Shaked Keter	Hapoel Pardesiya	5
3	(Israel) Taer Katana	Hapoel Baqa al-Gharbiyye	5
7	13 players		4
6	25 players		3
47	92 players		2
139	329 players		1
