= 2013–14 Maccabi Haifa F.C. season =

Maccabi Haifa
2013–14 season
- Chairman: Ya'akov Shahar
- Manager: Arik Benado
- Stadium: Kiryat Eliezer
- Ligat Ha'Al: 5th
- State Cup: Eighth round
- Europa League: Group stage
- Top goalscorer: League: Alon Turgeman (15); All: Alon Turgeman (19)
- Highest home attendance: 15,000 vs Maccabi Tel Aviv (14 May 2014)
- Lowest home attendance: 2,500 vs Shakhter Karagandy (12 December 2013)
- Average home league attendance: 9,315
Home colours	Away colours	Third colours

The 2013–14 season was Maccabi Haifa's 56th season in Israeli Premier League, and their 32nd consecutive season in the top division of Israeli football.

== Club ==
=== Squad ===
Last updated on 11 March 2014

Squad No.	Name	Nationality	Position(s)	Since	Date of birth (age)	Signed from	Games played	Goals scored	Note
Goalkeepers
22	Amir Edri	(Israel)	GK	2012	26 July 1985 (age 41)	(Israel) The academy	67	0	Injury
33	Bojan Šaranov	(Serbia)	GK	2011	22 September 1987 (age 39)	(Serbia) OFK Beograd	101	0	
44	Ron Shushan	(Israel)	GK	2012	11 June 1993 (age 33)	(Israel) The academy	0	0	
Defenders
2	Ayid Habshi	(Israel)	CB	2013	10 May 1995 (age 31)	(Israel) The academy	2	0	Eligible for youth team
5	Sari Falah	(Israel)	CB	2010	22 November 1991 (age 34)	(Israel) The academy	66	2	
13	Taleb Twatiha	(Israel)	LB	2009	21 June 1992 (age 34)	(Israel) The academy	148	6	
15	Elad Gabai	(Israel)	RB	2013	15 November 1985 (age 40)	(Israel) Ironi Kiryat Shmona	15	0	
18	Samuel Scheimann	(Israel)	LB	2012	3 November 1987 (age 39)	(Netherlands) SBV Excelsior	38	0	Injury
21	Dekel Keinan	(Israel)	CB	2012	15 September 1984 (age 42)	(Wales) Cardiff City	281	14	Injury
25	Edin Cocalić	(Bosnia and Herzegovina)	CB / DM	2012	5 December 1987 (age 38)	(Greece) Panionios	81	1	
27	Eyal Meshumar	(Israel)	RB	2006	10 August 1983 (age 43)	(Israel) Hapoel Kfar Saba	291	17	Injury
29	Andriy Pylyavskyi	(Ukraine)	CB	2011	4 December 1988 (age 37)	(Ukraine) Nyva Vinnytsia	65	2	
Midfielders
6	Ran Abukarat	(Israel)	CM / DM / AM	2013	14 December 1988 (age 37)	(Israel) Hapoel Haifa	19	0	Injury
7	Gustavo Boccoli (VC)	(Israel)	RM / DM / CM	2004	16 February 1978 (age 48)	(Israel) Maccabi Ahi Nazareth	406	48	
8	Hen Ezra	(Israel)	LW / RW	2012	19 January 1989 (age 37)	(Israel) Maccabi Netanya	76	17	Injury
10	Rubén Rayos	(Spain)	AM / LW	2013	21 June 1986 (age 40)	(Greece) Asteras Tripolis	35	13	
11	Idan Vered	(Israel)	LW / RW	2010	1 January 1989 (age 37)	(Israel) Beitar Jerusalem	136	13	Injury
14	Adi Konstantinos	(Israel)	LW / RW	2012	9 November 1994 (age 31)	(Israel) The academy	4	0	Eligible for youth team
20	Yaniv Katan (C)	(Israel)	AM / CM / CF	2006	27 January 1981 (age 45)	(England) West Ham United	634	113	
23	Eran Biton	(Israel)	LW / RW	2014	16 January 1996 (age 30)	(Israel) The academy	2	0	Eligible for youth team
26	Avihai Yadin	(Israel)	DM / CM	2012	26 October 1986 (age 40)	(Israel) Hapoel Tel Aviv	51	0	
	Jaber Ataa	(Israel)	DM / CM	2012	3 October 1994 (age 32)	(Israel) The academy	10	0	Injury
Forwards
9	Tamás Priskin	(Hungary)	ST	2014	27 September 1986 (age 40)	(Russia) Alania Vladikavkaz	7	1	
17	Alon Turgeman	(Israel)	RW / LW / CF	2011	6 September 1991 (age 35)	(Israel) Hapoel Petah Tikva	111	33	
19	Shimon Abuhatzira	(Israel)	ST	2013	10 October 1986 (age 40)	(Israel) Ironi Kiryat Shmona	26	4	Injury
24	Shoval Gozlan	(Israel)	ST	2012	25 April 1994 (age 32)	(Israel) The academy	29	6	
28	Shon Weissman	(Israel)	ST	2014	14 February 1996 (age 30)	(Israel) The academy	7	0	Eligible for youth team

- The games play include all appearances (League, State Cup, Toto cup and Europa)

=== Players out on loan ===
Note: Flags indicate national team as defined under FIFA eligibility rules; some limited exceptions apply. Players may hold more than one non-FIFA nationality.

No.	Pos.	Nation	Player
—	GK	ISR	Ram Strauss (at (Israel) Hapoel Ramat Gan until 30 June 2014)
—	DF	ISR	Orel Dgani (at (Israel) Hapoel Tel Aviv until 30 June 2015)
—	DF	ISR	Emri Zaid (at (Israel) Maccabi Ahi Nazareth until 30 June 2014)
—	DF	ISR	Akram Shariach (at (Israel) Bnei Lod F.C. until 30 June 2014)
—	DF	LTU	Martynas Dapkus (at (Israel) Hapoel Nazareth Illit until 30 June 2014)
—	MF	ISR	Dor Kochav (at (Israel) Hapoel Afula until 30 June 2014)
—	MF	ISR	Raz Shtein ( (Israel) Hapoel Katamon until 30 June 2014)
—	MF	ISR	Sintayehu Sallalich ( (Israel) Beitar Jerusalem until 30 June 2014)
—	MF	ISR	Ahmad Shaban (at (Israel) Hapoel Nazareth Illit until 30 June 2014)
—	MF	ISR	Eran Malchin ( (Israel) Hapoel Nazareth Illit until 30 June 2014)

No.	Pos.	Nation	Player
—	FW	ISR	Mohammad Ghadir (at (Israel) Bnei Sakhnin until 30 June 2014)
—	FW	ISR	Roi Atar ( (Israel) Hapoel Acre until 30 June 2014)
—	FW	ISR	Zidan Amar ( (Israel) Maccabi Daliyat al-Karmel until 30 June 2014)
—	FW	ISR	Haitem Halabi ( (Israel) Hapoel Nazareth Illit until 30 June 2014)
—	FW	ISR	Mohammed Kalibat ( (Israel) Bnei Sakhnin until 30 June 2014)
—	FW	USA	Noah Sadawe ( (Israel) Hapoel Nazareth Illit until 30 June 2014)
—	FW	ISR	Hen Azriel ( (Israel) Bnei Yehuda until 30 June 2014)
—	FW	ISR	Shlomi Azulay ( (Israel) Beitar Jerusalem until 30 June 2014)
—	FW	RSA	Dino Ndlovu ( (South Africa) SuperSport United until 30 June 2014)
—	MF	ISR	Ismaeel Ryan (at (Israel) Hapoel Acre until 30 June 2014)
—	FW	ISR	Weaam Amasha (at (Israel) Ironi Kiryat Shmona until 30 June 2014)

== Transfers ==
=== Summer transfers ===
Players In
Name	Nat	Pos	Moving from
Sari Falah	(Israel)	DF	(Israel) Bnei Yehuda
Sintayehu Sallalich	(Israel)	DF	(Israel) Ironi Kiryat Shmona
Elad Gabai	(Israel)	DF	(Israel) Ironi Kiryat Shmona
Shimon Abuhatzira	(Israel)	FW	(Israel) Ironi Kiryat Shmona
Rubén Rayos	(Spain)	MF	(Greece) Asteras Tripolis
Ran Abukarat	(Israel)	MF	(Israel) Hapoel Haifa

Players Out
Name	Nat	Pos	Moving to
Nir Davidovitch	(Israel)	GK	Retirement
Liroy Zhairi	(Israel)	MF	(Belgium) KV Mechelen
Oded Elkayam	(Israel)	DF	(Israel) Ironi Kiryat Shmona
Tamir Cohen	(Israel)	MF	(Israel) Hapoel Ra'anana
Orel Dgani	(Israel)	DF	(Israel) Hapoel Tel Aviv
Daniel Haber	(Canada)	FW	(Cyprus) Apollon Limassol
Dela Yampolsky	(Israel)	MF	(Israel) Hapoel Haifa
Sintayehu Sallalich	(Israel)	MF	(Israel) Beitar Jerusalem

=== Winter transfers ===
Players In
Name	Nat	Pos	Moving from
Tamás Priskin	(Czech Republic) (Hungary)	FW	(Russia) FC Alania Vladikavkaz

Players Out
Name	Nat	Pos	Moving to
Hen Azriel	(Israel)	FW	(Israel) Bnei Yehuda
Shlomi Azulay	(Israel)	FW	(Israel) Beitar Jerusalem
Dino Ndlovu	(South Africa)	FW	(South Africa) SuperSport United
Ismaeel Ryan	(Israel)	MF	(Israel) Hapoel Acre
Weaam Amasha	(Israel)	FW	(Israel) Ironi Kiryat Shmona

=== Current coaching staff ===
Position	Staff
Manager	(Israel) Arik Benado
Assistant manager	(Israel) Ori Uzan
2nd Assistant manager	(Israel) Patricio Seag
First team coach	(Israel) Shmulik Hanin
Fitness coach	(Israel) Uri Harel
2nd Fitness coach	(Israel) Hazi Nacsohni
Goalkeeping coach	(Israel) Giora Antman
Club Administrator	(Israel) Adoram Keisi

Source: maccabi-haifafc.walla.co.il

== Pre-season and friendlies ==
Win Draw Loss Postponed

3 July 2013 Friendlies	Maccabi Haifa (Israel)	1 – 2	(Romania) CFR Cluj	Achenkirch, Austria
20:30	Abuhatzira 33'	Report	Batin 51' (pen.); Tadé 88'	Stadium: Achenkirch's stadium

6 July 2013 Friendlies	Maccabi Haifa (Israel)	3 – 0	(Azerbaijan) Neftchi Baku	Achenkirch, Austria
20:30	Ezra 27'; Meshumar 79'; Twatiha 86'	Report		Stadium: Achenkirch's stadium

9 July 2013 Friendlies	Maccabi Haifa (Israel)	0 – 1	(Russia) Terek Grozny	Achenkirch, Austria
20:00		Report	Sadayev 80'	Stadium: Achenkirch's stadium

== Competitions ==
=== Ligat Ha'Al ===
==== Regular season ====
Win Draw Loss

25 August 2013 1	Maccabi Haifa	3 – 1	Ironi Kiryat Shmona	Haifa, Israel
21:00	Ezra 7', (yellow card) 78'; Rayo (yellow card) 30'; Turgeman 51'; Abukarat (yellow card) 60'; Yadin (yellow card) 70'; Scheimann (yellow card) 89'; Boccoli 89'	Report	Abutbul 34'; Abed (yellow card) 45'; Kassio (yellow card) 76'; Saba'a (yellow card) 90'	Stadium: Kiryat Eliezer Stadium; Attendance: 9,500; Referee: Orel Greenfeld

1 September 2013 2	F.C. Ashdod	3 – 2	Maccabi Haifa	Ashdod, Israel
20:00	Gadi Kinde 13'; Israel Rosh (yellow card) 20'; Beckel (yellow card) 51', (goal) 71'; Bello 63'; Paty Yeye (yellow card) 89'; Verta (yellow card) 90'	Report	Ezra 1', (yellow card) 61'; Ndlovu 40'; Scheimann (yellow card) 82'	Stadium: Yud-Alef Stadium; Attendance: 4,500; Referee: Ziv Adler

23 September 2013 3	Maccabi Haifa	0 – 3	Maccabi Tel Aviv	Haifa, Israel
21:00	Keinan (yellow card) 73'; Turgeman (yellow card) 82'	Report	Gal Alberman (yellow card) 27'; Yitzhaki 50', (yellow card) 77'; Prica 60', 75'	Stadium: Kiryat Eliezer Stadium; Attendance: 14,000; Referee: Roei Rainsriber

28 September 2013 4	Bnei Sakhnin	0 – 0	Maccabi Haifa	Sakhnin, Israel
17:30	Khalaila (yellow card) 50'; Kalibat (yellow card) 74'	Report	Keinan (yellow card) 28'; Pylyavskyi (yellow card) 54'	Stadium: Doha Stadium; Attendance: 3,800; Referee: Daniel Bar Natan

6 October 2013 5	Maccabi Haifa	0 – 0	Hapoel Be'er Sheva	Haifa, Israel
20:40	Ezra (yellow card) 9'; Keinan (yellow card) 26' (red card) 41'; Tawatha (yellow card) 35'; Golasa (yellow card) 39'; Šaranov (yellow card) 88'	Report	Siraj Nassar (yellow card) 22'; Barda (penalty missed) 41'; Swisa (yellow card) 89'	Stadium: Kiryat Eliezer Stadium; Attendance: 13,000; Referee: Eli Hakmon

19 October 2013 6	Maccabi Petah Tikva	0 – 3	Maccabi Haifa	Petah Tikva, Israel
19:30	Gidi Kanyuk (yellow card) 37'; Galván (red card) 64'; Shmulik Malul (yellow card) 78'; Zito (yellow card) 84'	Report	Ezra 23'; Shmulik Malul 29' (o.g.); Azulay 78'	Stadium: HaMoshava Stadium; Attendance: 6,000; Referee: Ziv Adler

27 October 2013 7	Maccabi Haifa	0 – 1	Hapoel Haifa	Haifa, Israel
20:30	Tawatha (yellow card) 9'; Gabai (yellow card) 89'	Report	Liran Serdal (yellow card) 3'; Korać 13', (yellow card) 86'; Kiwan (yellow card) 50'; Cohen (yellow card) 84'	Stadium: Kiryat Eliezer Stadium; Attendance: 13,000; Referee: Alon Yefet

2 November 2013 8	Hapoel Ra'anana	1 - 0	Maccabi Haifa	Netanya, Israel
17:00	Binyamin (yellow card) 3'; Eudi Silva (yellow card) 47'; Cohen 59'; Mbola (yellow card) 89'; Lavi (yellow card) 90'	Report	Keinan (yellow card) 36'; Ndlovu (yellow card) 42'; Rayos (yellow card) 44'; Meshumar (yellow card) 59'	Stadium: Netanya Stadium; Attendance: 3,500; Referee: Liran Liany

11 November 2013 9	Maccabi Haifa	2 – 0	Beitar Jerusalem	Haifa, Israel
20:50	Turgeman 51'; Katan (yellow card) 59'; Ezra 79'	Report	Dasa (yellow card) 28'; Bangura (yellow card) 79'	Stadium: Kiryat Eliezer Stadium; Attendance: 12,000; Referee: Orel Greenfeld

24 November 2013 10	Hapoel Tel Aviv	2 – 4	Maccabi Haifa	Tel Aviv, Israel
20:15	Damari 11', (yellow card) 56'; Haimovich (yellow card) 64'; Safouri 94'	Report	Ilič 22' (o.g.); Rayos 49'; Cocalić (yellow card) 56'; Turgeman 71'; Abuhatzira 80', (yellow card) 85'	Stadium: Bloomfield Stadium; Attendance: 13,500; Referee: Ziv Adler

2 December 2013 11	Maccabi Haifa	2 – 1	Hapoel Acre	Haifa, Israel
19:00	Yadin (yellow card) 6'; Keinan (yellow card) 45'; Azulay 52'; Katan (yellow card) 82'; Gozlan 86'	Report	Spadacio 9'; Dayan (yellow card) 43'; Elior Sider (yellow card) 58'; Mirko Oremuš (yellow card) 73', (red card) 75'; Abu Raiya (yellow card) 73'; Goresh (yellow card) 84'; Taga (yellow card) 90'	Stadium: Kiryat Eliezer Stadium; Attendance: 7,000; Referee: Eitan Smuelavich

7 December 2013 12	Bnei Yehuda Tel Aviv	0 – 2	Maccabi Haifa	Tel Aviv, Israel
19:15	Hrepka (yellow card) 74'	Report	Rayos 49', 59' (pen.), (yellow card) 61'; Katan (yellow card) 74'	Stadium: Bloomfield Stadium; Attendance: 7,000; Referee: Liran Liany

16 December 2013 13	Maccabi Haifa	1 – 1	Ironi Ramat HaSharon	Haifa, Israel
19:00	Katan (yellow card) 29'; Gozlan 74'; Falah (yellow card) 79'	Report	Ben Reichert 45'; Itamar Nitzan (yellow card) 76'; Abu Zaid (yellow card) 80'	Stadium: Kiryat Eliezer Stadium; Attendance: 6,000; Referee: Ziv Adler

22 December 2013 14	Ironi Kiryat Shmona	1 – 2	Maccabi Haifa	Kiryat Shmona, Israel
19:40	Kassio (yellow card) 7'; Ofir Mizrahi (yellow card) 8', (goal) 45'; Badash 68', (yellow card) 69'	Report	Turgeman 43'; Rayos (yellow card) 47'	Stadium: Kiryat Shmona Municipal Stadium; Attendance: 3,000; Referee: Erez Papier

28 December 2013 15	Maccabi Haifa	2 – 1	F.C. Ashdod	Haifa, Israel
19:15	Turgeman 20'; Cocalić (yellow card) 24'; Rayos 49', (yellow card) 55'	Report	Beckel (yellow card) 50'; Solari 68'	Stadium: Kiryat Eliezer Stadium; Attendance: 9,000; Referee: Halim Zatma

6 January 2014 16	Maccabi Tel Aviv	3 – 1	Maccabi Haifa	Tel Aviv, Israel
20:50	Zahavi (yellow card) 40'; Prica 49', (yellow card) 80'; Yeini 56'; Yitzhaki 70'	Report	Cocalić (yellow card) 24'; Falah (yellow card) 36', (red card) 47'; Turgeman 64'; Katan (yellow card) 80'	Stadium: Bloomfield Stadium; Attendance: 14,500; Referee: Alon Yefet

11 January 2014 17	Maccabi Haifa	2 – 1	Bnei Sakhnin	Haifa, Israel
17:00	Keinan (yellow card) 24'; Ezra 49'; Gozlan 55'; Boccoli (yellow card) 53'; Ayid Habshi (yellow card) 76'	Report	Ottman (yellow card) 21'; Khalaila (yellow card) 35'; Kalibat 77' (pen.)	Stadium: Kiryat Eliezer Stadium; Attendance: 10,000; Referee: Eli Hakmon

20 January 2014 18	Hapoel Be'er Sheva	3 – 1	Maccabi Haifa	Be'er Sheva, Israel
20:50	Pajović 20'; Plet 28'; Iluz (yellow card) 34'; B. Turgeman (yellow card) 48'; Harel (yellow card) 57'; Gabay 54'; Barda (yellow card) 87'	Report	A. Turgeman 11', (yellow card) 19'; Abukarat (yellow card) 60'	Stadium: Vasermil Stadium; Attendance: 11,000; Referee: Manasseh Messiah

25 January 2014 19	Maccabi Haifa	1 – 0	Maccabi Petah Tikva	Haifa, Israel
18:05	Vered 9'; Falah (yellow card) 28'; Meshumar (yellow card) 76'	Report	Merey (yellow card) 24'; Hagay Goldenberg (yellow card) 76'	Stadium: Kiryat Eliezer Stadium; Attendance: 7,000; Referee: Eitan Smuelavich

1 February 2014 20	Hapoel Haifa	0 – 1	Maccabi Haifa	Haifa, Israel
19:30	Azam (yellow card) 45'; Or Ostvind (yellow card) 86'; Kijanskas (yellow card) 90'	Report	Turgeman 83', (yellow card) 84'	Stadium: Kiryat Eliezer Stadium; Attendance: 9,000; Referee: Liran Liany

8 February 2014 21	Maccabi Haifa	3 – 1	Hapoel Ra'anana	Haifa, Israel
18:45	Rayos 15', 31' (pen.), Turgeman 90'	Report	Babayev (yellow card) 17'; Mesika 58'; Mbola (yellow card) 74'	Stadium: Kiryat Eliezer Stadium; Attendance: 8,000; Referee: Daniel Bar Natan

16 February 2014 22	Beitar Jerusalem	1 – 0	Maccabi Haifa	Jerusalem, Israel
20:15	Haddad (yellow card) 8'; Bryan (yellow card) 37'; Baruchyan 75' (pen.)	Report	Keinan (yellow card) 37'; Falah (yellow card) 64'; Turgeman (yellow card) 82'; Tawatha (yellow card) 94'	Stadium: Teddy Stadium; Attendance: 15,000; Referee: Roei Rainsriber

24 February 2014 23	Maccabi Haifa	3 – 1	Hapoel Tel Aviv	Haifa, Israel
20:50	Priskin 28', (yellow card) 70'; Turgeman (yellow card) 50', (goal) 54'; Meshumar (yellow card) 78'; Boccoli (yellow card) 83'; Gozlan 86'; Katan (yellow card) 88'	Report	Sasha (yellow card) 36', (goal) 67'; Dgani (yellow card) 60', (red card) 69'	Stadium: Kiryat Eliezer Stadium; Attendance: 13,000; Referee: Alon Yefet

1 March 2014 24	Hapoel Acre	1 – 1	Maccabi Haifa	Acre, Israel
18:00	Salihi 37'; Gotlieb (yellow card) 44'; Dayan (yellow card) 84'	Report	Rayos 75', (yellow card) 84'; Falah (yellow card) 73'; Abukarat (yellow card) 79'	Stadium: Acre Municipal Stadium; Attendance: 5,000; Referee: Orel Greenfeld

9 March 2014 25	Maccabi Haifa	2 – 2	Bnei Yehuda Tel Aviv	Haifa, Israel
20:15	Keinan (yellow card) 44'; Gozlan 71', (yellow card) 74'; Rayos (red card) 84'; Edri (yellow card) 84'; Cohen 97' (o.g.)	Report	Raly 3'; Zhairi (yellow card) 23'; Kadusi 37'; Cohen (yellow card) 84'	Stadium: Kiryat Eliezer Stadium; Attendance: 6,000; Referee: Shai Shitrit

16 March 2014 26	Ironi Ramat HaSharon	1 – 2	Maccabi Haifa	Ramat HaSharon, Israel
20:15	Shivhon 30'; Reichert (yellow card) 80'	Report	Turgeman 15'; Keinan (yellow card) 55'; Vered 79'	Stadium: Grundman Stadium; Attendance: 1,600; Referee: Alon Yefet

===== Table =====
Pos	Team	Pld	W	D	L	GF	GA	GD	Pts	Qualification
2	Hapoel Be'er Sheva	26	18	5	3	48	19	+29	59	Qualification for the championship round
3	Ironi Kiryat Shmona	26	12	8	6	38	26	+12	44	Qualification for the championship round
4	Maccabi Haifa	26	13	5	8	39	30	+9	44	Qualification for the championship round
5	Bnei Sakhnin	26	11	7	8	30	25	+5	40	Qualification for the championship round
6	Hapoel Tel Aviv	26	11	6	9	51	38	+13	39	Qualification for the championship round

Source: Israel Football Association
Rules for classification: 1st points; 2nd goal difference; 3rd matches won; 4th goals scored; 5th head-to-head; 6th decision match. Winners of 2013–14 Israel State Cup qualify for the second qualifying round of the UEFA Europa League.

==== Play-off ====
22 March 2014 27	Ironi Kiryat Shmona	1 – 0	Maccabi Haifa	Kiryat Shmona, Israel
21:00	Kassio (yellow card) 18'; Rochet (yellow card) 59'; Amasha 67' (pen.); Tzedek (yellow card) 90'	Report	Falah (yellow card) 16'; Tawatha (yellow card) 66'	Stadium: Kiryat Shmona Municipal Stadium; Attendance: 4,500; Referee: Orel Greenfeld

29 March 2014 28	Hapoel Tel Aviv	4 – 0	Maccabi Haifa	Tel Aviv, Israel
18:00	Abutbul 19', (yellow card) 48'; Zaguri 26'; Sasha 50'; Damari (penalty missed); Fadida 85'	Report	Katan (yellow card) 30'; Cocalić (yellow card) 68'; Yadin (yellow card) 88'	Stadium: Bloomfield Stadium; Referee: Erez Papier

5 April 2014 29	Maccabi Haifa	1 – 2	Bnei Sakhnin	Haifa, Israel
16:45	Turgeman 11'	Report	Basam Ganayem (yellow card) 30'; Ottman 71', (yellow card) 87'; Fernández Gracia 87'	Stadium: Kiryat Eliezer Stadium; Attendance: 6,500; Referee: Shai Shitrit

13 April 2014 30	Maccabi Tel Aviv	1 – 0	Maccabi Haifa	Tel Aviv, Israel
20:50	Badash (yellow card) 39'; Ben Haim (yellow card) 47'; Radi (yellow card) 87', (penalty missed); Alberman 92'	Report	Meshumar (yellow card) 3'; Šaranov (yellow card) 20'; Yadin (red card) 88'; Keinan (yellow card) 66'; Scheimann (yellow card) 90'; Turgeman (yellow card) 90'	Stadium: Bloomfield Stadium; Attendance: 13,000; Referee: Erez Papier

19 April 2014 31	Maccabi Haifa	2 – 1	Hapoel Be'er Sheva	Netanya, Israel
19:30	Gozlan 1'; Turgeman 44'; Cocalić (yellow card) 78'; Gabai (yellow card) 87'; Adi Konstantinos (yellow card) 90'	Report	Buzaglo 9', (yellow card) 55'; Plet (yellow card) 31'	Stadium: Netanya Stadium; Attendance: 5,000; Referee: Orel Greenfeld

28 April 2014 32	Maccabi Haifa	1 – 3	Ironi Kiryat Shmona	Haifa, Israel
21:00	Cocalić 19'; Turgeman (yellow card) 38'; Yadin (yellow card) 68'	Report	Kassio (yellow card) 18'; Kahat 23', 37'; Dilmoni (yellow card) 51'; Panka 56'	Stadium: Kiryat Eliezer Stadium; Attendance: 5,500; Referee: Eitan Smuelavich

3 May 2014 33	Maccabi Haifa	1 – 1	Hapoel Tel Aviv	Haifa, Israel
16:00	Turgeman 1'	Report	Levi (yellow card) 85'; Sasha 90'	Stadium: Kiryat Eliezer Stadium; Attendance: 6,500; Referee: Eli Hakmon

10 May 2014 34	Bnei Sakhnin	0 – 2	Maccabi Haifa	Sakhnin, Israel
17:45	Ghadir (yellow card) 61'; Basam Ganayem (yellow card) 91'	Report	Falah (yellow card) 25'; Rayos 35'; Boccoli (yellow card) 64'; Turgeman 69'; Tawatha (yellow card) 72'	Stadium: Doha Stadium; Attendance: 1,500; Referee: Sahar Arbeli

14 May 2014 35	Maccabi Haifa	2 – 2	Maccabi Tel Aviv	Haifa, Israel
19:30	Rayos 22' (pen.), 41'; Gabai (yellow card) 33'; Falah (yellow card) 45'; Cocalić (yellow card) 85'	Report	Maréval (yellow card) 21'; Zahavi 24', 86'; Yeini (yellow card) 51'	Stadium: Kiryat Eliezer Stadium; Attendance: 15,000; Referee: Manasseh Messiah

17 May 2014 36	Hapoel Be'er Sheva	1 – 1	Maccabi Haifa	Be'er Sheva, Israel
20:00	Glynor Plet 37'; Pajović (yellow card) 71'		Boccoli (yellow card) 9'; Falah (yellow card) 41'; Rayos 44'	Stadium: Vasermil Stadium; Attendance: 3,000; Referee: Erez Papir

===== Table =====
Pos	Team	Pld	W	D	L	GF	GA	GD	Pts	Qualification
2	Hapoel Be'er Sheva	36	20	8	8	56	33	+23	68	Qualification for the Europa League second qualifying round (Note: Since Ironi Kiryat Shmona won the 2013–14 Israel State Cup, then the 4th-positioned team will be awarded with entry to the second qualifying round of the UEFA Europa League.)
3	Ironi Kiryat Shmona	36	18	10	8	59	38	+21	64	Qualification for the Europa League third qualifying round
4	Hapoel Tel Aviv	36	16	10	10	72	47	+25	58	Qualification for the Europa League second qualifying round
5	Maccabi Haifa	36	15	8	13	49	46	+3	53	
6	Bnei Sakhnin	36	13	8	15	37	47	−10	47	

Source: Israel Football Association
Rules for classification: 1st points; 2nd goal difference; 3rd matches won; 4th goals scored; 5th head-to-head; 6th decision match

==== Results summary ====
Overall								Home						Away					
Pld	W	D	L	GF	GA	GD	Pts	W	D	L	GF	GA	GD	W	D	L	GF	GA	GD
36	15	8	13	49	46	+3	53	9	5	4	28	22	+6	6	3	9	21	24	−3

Last updated: 17 May 2014.
Source: Competitive matches

==== Results by round ====
Round	1	2	3	4	5	6	7	8	9	10	11	12	13	14	15	16	17	18	19	20	21	22	23	24	25	26	27	28	29	30	31	32	33	34	35	36
Ground	H	A	H	A	H	A	H	A	H	A	H	A	H	A	H	A	H	A	H	A	H	A	H	A	H	A	A	A	H	A	H	H	H	A	H	A
Result	W	L	L	D	D	W	L	L	W	W	W	W	D	L	W	L	W	L	W	W	W	L	W	D	D	W	L	L	L	L	W	L	D	W	D	D
Position	1	6	10	10	10	9	10	10	10	7	4	4	4	5	5	5	5	6	5	4	3	4	4	4	4	4	4	4	5	5	5	5	5	5	5	5

Updated to match(es) played on 10 May 2014. Source: Competitive Matches
A = Away; H = Home; W = Win; D = Draw; L = Loss

=== State Cup ===
==== Eighth Round ====
29 January 2014 Eighth Round	Hapoel Ra'anana	0 – 0 (8 – 7 p)	Maccabi Haifa	Netanya, Israel
19:00		Report		Stadium: Netanya Stadium; Attendance: 3,500; Referee: Shai Shitrit
	Penalties
	Cohen (penalty missed); Saba'a (penalty missed); Lavi (penalty scored); Mesika (penalty scored); Nwakaeme (penalty scored); Mamadou Touré Thiam (penalty scored); Nimni (penalty scored); Mbola (penalty scored); Yanko (penalty scored); Yogev Lerman (penalty scored)		Rayos (penalty scored); Turgeman (penalty missed); Abukarat (penalty scored); Falah (penalty scored); Keinan (penalty missed); Katan (penalty scored); Pylyavskyi (penalty scored); Shon Weissman (penalty scored); Vered (penalty scored); Scheimann (penalty missed)

=== Europa League ===
==== Qualifying ====
18 July 2013 Second round	Maccabi Haifa (Israel)	2 – 0	(Azerbaijan) Khazar Lankaran	Haifa, Israel
20:00	Ezra 37'; Turgeman 55'	Report	Abdullayev (yellow card) 87'	Stadium: Kiryat Eliezer; Attendance: 11,000; Referee: Slavko Vinčić (Slovenia)

25 July 2013 Second round	Khazar Lankaran (Azerbaijan)	0 – 8	(Israel) Maccabi Haifa	Lankaran, Azerbaijan
19:00	Doblas (yellow card) 3'; Oršulić (yellow card) 48'; Gligorov (yellow card) 69'	Report	Turgeman 7'; Katan 10'; Rayos 13' (pen.), 62'; Abuhatzira 26', 41'; Ezra 41'; Golasa 76'	Stadium: Lankaran City Stadium; Attendance: 11,000; Referee: Danny Makkelie (Netherlands)

Maccabi Haifa won 10–0 on aggregate

1 August 2013 Third round	Ventspils (Latvia)	0 – 0	(Israel) Maccabi Haifa	Riga, Latvia
19:00	Sukhanov (yellow card) 32'	Report	Abuhatzira (yellow card) 37'; Boccoli (yellow card) 89'	Stadium: Skonto Stadium; Attendance: 6,000; Referee: Marco Borg (Malta)

8 August 2013 Third round	Maccabi Haifa (Israel)	3 – 0	(Latvia) Ventspils	Haifa, Israel
19:30	Keinan (yellow card) 23'; Smirnovs 35' (o.g.); Rayo 41', 53'	Report	Freidgeimas (yellow card) 29'; Paulius (yellow card) 43'	Stadium: Kiryat Eliezer; Attendance: 12,000; Referee: Michael Lerjéus (Sweden)

Maccabi Haifa won 3–0 on aggregate

22 August 2013 Play-off round	Maccabi Haifa (Israel)	2 – 0	(Romania) Astra Giurgiu	Haifa, Israel
19:30	Keinan (yellow card) 20'; Katan (yellow card) 28'; Rayo 30', (penalty missed) 41'; Meshumar (yellow card) 51'; Boccoli (yellow card) 58'; Turgeman 61'	Report	Morais (yellow card) 40'; Mățel (yellow card) 57'	Stadium: Kiryat Eliezer; Attendance: 12,500; Referee: Kevin Blom (Netherlands)

29 August 2013 Play-off round	Astra Giurgiu (Romania)	1 – 1	(Israel) Maccabi Haifa	Piatra Neamț, Romania
19:00	Găman 27'; Fatai (yellow card) 36'; Cristescu (yellow card) 47'; Ivanovski (yellow card) 50'	Report	Katan (yellow card) 28'; Rayo 34'; Ndlovu (yellow card) 85'; Boccoli (yellow card) 86'	Stadium: Stadionul Ceahlăul; Attendance: 2,000; Referee: Hüseyin Göçek (Turkey)

Maccabi Haifa won 3–1 on aggregate

==== Group stage ====
19 September 2013 Group stage	Maccabi Haifa (Israel)	0 – 1	(Netherlands) AZ	Haifa, Israel
22:05	Turgeman (yellow card) 59'; Ndlovu (yellow card) 73'	Report	Ortiz (yellow card) 28'; Guðmundsson 70'; Gouweleeuw (yellow card) 73'	Stadium: Kiryat Eliezer; Attendance: 11,000; Referee: Robert Schörgenhofer (Austria)

3 October 2013 Group stage	Shakhter Karagandy (Kazakhstan)	2 – 2	(Israel) Maccabi Haifa	Astana, Kazakhstan
19:00	Finonchenko 40'; Tarasov 45'; Cañas (yellow card) 50'; Đidić (yellow card) 64'	Report	Ezra 54'; Turgeman 79'	Stadium: Astana Arena; Attendance: 12,000; Referee: István Vad (Hungary)

24 October 2013 Group stage	PAOK Thessaloniki (Greece)	3 – 2	(Israel) Maccabi Haifa	Thessaloniki, Greece
20:00	Vítor 35'; Stoch (penalty missed) 39, (penalty missed) 45; Ninis 39'; Kitsiou (yellow card) 42'; Salpingidis 67'	Report	Ndlovu 13'; Golasa 21'; Cocalić (yellow card) 38'; Ezra (yellow card) 44'; Meshumar (yellow card) 61'	Stadium: Toumba Stadium; Attendance: 20,000; Referee: Fernando Teixeira Vitienes (Spain)

7 November 2013 Group stage	Maccabi Haifa (Israel)	0 – 0	(Greece) PAOK Thessaloniki	Haifa, Israel
22:05	Ezra (yellow card) 26'; Abukarat (yellow card) 32'; Gozlan (yellow card) 34'	Report	Katsikas (yellow card) 36'; Lino (yellow card) 91'; Skondras (yellow card) 93'	Stadium: Kiryat Eliezer; Attendance: 8,500; Referee: Zwayer (Germany)

28 November 2013 Group stage	AZ (Netherlands)	2 – 0	(Israel) Maccabi Haifa	Alkmaar, Netherlands
20:00	Gudelj 37'; Guðmundsso 90'		Turgeman (yellow card) 12'	Stadium: AFAS Stadion; Attendance: 11,000; Referee: (Belarus) Kulbakov

12 December 2013 Group stage	Maccabi Haifa (Israel)	2 – 1	(Kazakhstan) Shakhter Karagandy	Haifa, Israel
22:05	Abukarat (yellow card) 43'; Scheimann (yellow card) 49'; Gozlan 72'; Abuhatzira 80'	Report	Cañas 44' (pen.)	Stadium: Kiryat Eliezer; Attendance: 2,500; Referee: (Lithuania) Gediminas Mažeika

Group L
Pos	Team	Pld	W	D	L	GF	GA	GD	Pts	Qualification
1	(Netherlands) AZ	6	3	3	0	8	4	+4	12 (Note: Tied on head-to-head points (2) and head-to-head goal difference (0). Head-to-head away goals: AZ 2, PAOK 1.)	Advance to knockout phase
2	(Greece) PAOK	6	3	3	0	10	6	+4	12	Advance to knockout phase
3	(Israel) Maccabi Haifa	6	1	2	3	6	9	−3	5	
4	(Kazakhstan) Shakhter Karagandy	6	0	2	4	5	10	−5	2	

Source: Soccerway

== Squad statistics ==
Updated on 21 May 2014

			Ligat Ha'Al					State Cup					Europa League					Total				
Nation	No.	Name		GS	Min.	Goal	Assist		GS	Min.	Goal	Assist		GS	Min.	Goal	Assist		GS	Min.	Goal	Assist
Goalkeepers
(Israel)	22	Amir Edri	10	10	842	0	0	1	1	120	0	0	1	1	90	0	0	12	12	1,052	0	0
(Serbia)	33	Bojan Šaranov	27	25	2,308	0	0	0	0	0	0	0	11	11	990	0	0	38	36	3,298	0	0
(Israel)	44	Ron Shushan	1	1	90	0	0	0	0	0	0	0	0	0	0	0	0	1	1	90	0	0
Defenders
(Israel)	2	Ayid Habshi	3	1	119	0	0	0	0	0	0	0	0	0	0	0	0	3	1	119	0	0
(Israel)	5	Sari Falah	21	21	1,846	0	1	1	1	120	0	0	1	1	90	0	0	23	23	2,056	0	1
(Israel)	13	Taleb Twatiha	26	26	2,322	0	2	0	0	0	0	0	11	11	917	0	1	37	37	3,209	0	3
(Israel)	15	Elad Gabai	14	9	884	0	0	1	1	60	0	0	5	4	392	0	0	20	14	1,336	0	0
(Israel)	18	Samuel Scheimann	15	13	1,133	0	1	1	1	120	0	0	4	2	253	0	0	22	18	1,902	0	1
(Israel)	21	Dekel Keinan	24	23	1,972	0	0	1	1	120	0	0	9	9	810	0	0	34	33	2,902	0	0
(Bosnia and Herzegovina)	25	Edin Cocalić	21	20	1,820	1	0	0	0	0	0	0	11	11	990	0	0	32	31	2,810	1	0
(Israel)	27	Eyal Meshumar	26	26	2,279	0	3	0	0	0	0	0	8	8	647	0	0	34	34	2,969	0	3
(Ukraine)	29	Andriy Pylyavskyi	17	12	1,138	0	0	1	1	120	0	0	5	3	294	0	0	23	16	1,551	0	0
Midfielders
(Israel)	6	Ran Abukarat	13	8	731	0	0	1	1	120	0	0	5	3	298	0	0	19	12	1,149	0	0
(Israel)	7	Gustavo Boccoli	26	23	1,900	1	0	0	0	0	0	0	10	9	804	0	0	36	32	2,704	1	0
(Israel)	8	Hen Ezra	24	21	1,930	5	4	1	1	40	0	0	10	9	832	3	6	35	31	2,803	8	6
(Spain)	10	Rubén Rayos	27	27	2,297	11	4	1	0	60	0	0	12	9	901	6	2	40	37	3,258	17	6
(Israel)	11	Idan Vered	24	7	899	2	2	1	1	120	0	0	5	3	230	0	1	30	11	1,249	2	1
(Israel)	14	Adi Konstantinos	6	3	273	0	1	0	0	0	0	0	0	0	0	0	0	6	3	273	0	1
(Israel)	20	Yaniv Katan	27	23	1,968	0	3	1	0	80	0	0	8	7	616	1	1	36	30	2,664	1	4
(Israel)	23	Eran Biton	6	3	291	0	2	0	0	0	0	0	0	0	0	0	0	6	3	291	0	2
(Israel)	26	Avihai Yadin	20	16	1,506	0	0	0	0	0	0	0	5	3	273	0	0	24	19	1,779	0	0
(Israel)		Jaber Ataa	0	0	0	0	0	0	0	0	0	0	0	0	0	0	0	0	0	0	0	0
(Israel)		Raz Meir	1	0	12	0	0	0	0	0	0	0	0	0	0	0	0	1	0	12	0	0
Forwards
(Czech Republic) (Hungary)	9	Tamás Priskin	11	5	553	1	0	0	0	0	0	0	0	0	0	0	0	11	5	553	1	0
(Israel)	17	Alon Turgeman	34	32	2,684	15	4	1	1	120	0	0	10	8	677	4	1	45	42	3,572	19	4
(Israel)	19	Shimon Abuhatzira	14	10	766	1	1	0	0	0	0	0	12	9	860	3	3	26	19	1,626	4	4
(Israel)	24	Shoval Gozlan	26	24	1,324	6	1	1	1	84	0	0	2	2	135	1	0	29	17	1,541	7	1
(Israel)	28	Shon Weissman	10	5	370	0	0	1	0	38	0	0	0	0	0	0	0	11	5	408	0	0
(Israel)		Dor Hugi	1	0	31	0	0	0	0	0	0	0	0	0	0	0	0	1	0	31	0	0
Players who no longer play for Maccabi Haifa
(Israel)	9	Shlomi Azulay	7	2	245	2	0	0	0	0	0	0	3	1	98	0	0	10	3	343	2	0
(South Africa)	12	Dino Ndlovu	8	5	407	1	0	0	0	0	0	0	7	3	98	1	0	15	8	657	2	0
(Israel)	14	Sintayehu Sallalich	0	0	0	0	0	0	0	0	0	0	2	0	51	0	0	2	0	51	0	0
(Israel)	15	Eyal Golasa	5	3	233	0	0	0	0	0	0	0	6	2	247	2	0	11	5	480	2	0
(Israel)	16	Ismaeel Ryan	5	0	100	0	0	0	0	0	0	0	5	2	163	0	0	10	2	269	0	0

=== Goals ===
Rank	Player	Position	League	State Cup	UEL	Total
1	(Israel) Alon Turgeman	MF	15	0	4	19
2	(Spain) Rubén Rayos	MF	11	0	6	17
3	(Israel) Hen Ezra	MF	5	0	4	9
4	(Israel) Shoval Gozlan	FW	6	0	1	7
5	(Israel) Shimon Abuhatzira	FW	1	0	3	4
6	(Israel) Idan Vered	MF	2	0	0	2
6	(South Africa) Dino Ndlovu	FW	1	0	2	2
6	(Israel) Shlomi Azulay	FW	2	0	0	2
6	(Israel) Eyal Golasa	MF	0	0	2	2
7	(Israel) Yaniv Katan	MF	0	0	1	1
7	(Israel) Gustavo Boccoli	MF	1	0	0	1
7	(Hungary) Tamás Priskin	FW	1	0	0	1
7	(Bosnia and Herzegovina) Edin Cocalić	DF	1	0	0	1
Own goals			3	0	1	4
Total			49	0	22	72

=== Disciplinary record ===
No.	Pos.	Name	Ligat Ha'Al		State Cup		Total		Notes
No.	Pos.	Name	Yellow card	Red card	Yellow card	Red card	Yellow card	Red card	
24	DF	Dekel Keinan	11	1	0	0	11	1	
5	DF	Sari Falah	9	1	0	0	9	1	
17	FW	Alon Turgeman	8	0	0	0	8	0	
20	MF	Yaniv Katan	7	0	0	0	7	0	
25	DF	Edin Cocalić	6	0	0	0	6	0	
10	MF	Rubén Rayos	5	1	0	0	5	1	
13	DF	Taleb Twatiha	5	0	0	0	5	0	
7	MF	Gustavo Boccoli	4	0	0	0	4	0	
27	DF	Eyal Meshumar	4	0	0	0	4	0	
26	MF	Avihai Yadin	4	1	0	0	4	1	
8	MF	Hen Ezra	3	0	0	0	3	0	
18	DF	Elad Gabai	3	0	0	0	3	0	
3	DF	Samuel Scheimann	4	0	0	0	4	0	
6	MF	Ran Abukarat	3	0	0	0	3	0	
33	GK	Bojan Šaranov	2	0	0	0	2	0	
24	FW	Shoval Gozlan	1	0	0	0	1	0	
14	MF	Adi Konstantinos	1	0	0	0	1	0	
19	FW	Shimon Abuhatzira	1	0	0	0	1	0	
29	DF	Andriy Pylyavskyi	1	0	0	0	1	0	
2	DF	Ayid Habshi	1	0	0	0	1	0	
9	FW	Tamás Priskin	1	0	0	0	1	0	
22	GK	Amir Edri	1	0	0	0	1	0	
12	FW	Dino Ndlovu	1	0	0	0	1	0	
15	MF	Eyal Golasa	1	0	0	0	1	0	

==== Disciplinary record Europa League ====
No.	Pos.	Name	Group Stage		Qualifying Phase		Total		Notes
No.	Pos.	Name	Yellow card	Red card	Yellow card	Red card	Yellow card	Red card	
8	MF	Hen Ezra	2	0	1	0	2	0	
17	FW	Alon Turgeman	2	0	0	0	2	0	
6	MF	Ran Abukarat	2	0	0	0	2	0	
27	DF	Eyal Meshumar	1	0	1	0	1	0	
25	DF	Edin Cocalić	1	0	1	0	1	0	
12	FW	Dino Ndlovu	1	0	0	0	1	0	
24	FW	Shoval Gozlan	1	0	0	0	1	0	
3	DF	Samuel Scheimann	1	0	0	0	1	0	
7	MF	Gustavo Boccoli	0	0	3	0	3	0	
21	DF	Dekel Keinan	0	0	2	0	2	0	
20	MF	Yaniv Katan	0	0	2	0	2	0	
19	FW	Shimon Abuhatzira	0	0	1	0	1	0	

=== Penalties ===
Date	Penalty Taker	Scored	Opponent	Competition
25 July 2013	Rubén Rayos	Yes	Khazar Lankaran	Europa League
22 August 2013	Rubén Rayos	No	Astra Giurgiu	Europa League
24 November 2013	Shimon Abuhatzira	Yes	Hapoel Tel Aviv	Ligat Ha'Al
7 December 2013	Rubén Rayos	Yes	Bnei Yehuda Tel Aviv	Ligat Ha'Al
28 December 2013	Rubén Rayos	Yes	F.C. Ashdod	Ligat Ha'Al
8 February 2014	Rubén Rayos	Yes	Hapoel Ra'anana	Ligat Ha'Al
14 May 2014	Rubén Rayos	Yes	Maccabi Tel Aviv	Ligat Ha'Al

=== Overall ===
	Total	Home	Away
Games played	49	24	25
Games won	20	13	7
Games drawn	12	6	6
Games lost	16	7	9
Biggest win	8–0 vs (Azerbaijan) Khazar Lankaran	3–0 vs (Latvia) Ventspils	8–0 vs (Azerbaijan) Khazar Lankaran
Biggest loss	0–4 vs Hapoel Tel Aviv	0–3 vs Maccabi Tel Aviv	0–4 vs Hapoel Tel Aviv
Biggest win (League)	3–0 vs Maccabi Petah Tikva	3–1 vs Ironi Kiryat Shmona; 3-1 vs Hapoel Ra'anana; 3-1 vs Hapoel Tel Aviv; 2–0 vs Beitar Jerusalem	3–0 vs Maccabi Petah Tikva
Biggest win (Cup)	–		
Biggest win (Europe)	8–0 vs (Azerbaijan) Khazar Lankaran	3–0 vs (Latvia) Ventspils	8–0 vs (Azerbaijan) Khazar Lankaran
Biggest loss (League)	0–4 vs Hapoel Tel Aviv	0–3 vs Maccabi Tel Aviv	0–4 vs Hapoel Tel Aviv
Biggest loss (Cup)	7-8 Hapoel Ra'anana	-	7-8 Hapoel Ra'anana
Biggest loss (Europe)	0–1 vs (Netherlands) AZ	0–1 vs (Netherlands) AZ	0–2 vs (Netherlands) AZ
Clean sheets	12	7	5
Goals scored	71	37	34
Goals conceded	56	24	32
Goal difference	+15	+13	+2
Average GF per game	1.45	1.54	1.36
Average GA per game	1.14	1	1.28
Yellow cards	105	55	50
Red cards	4	2	2
Most appearances	(Israel) Alon Turgeman (45)	–	
Most minutes played	(Israel) Alon Turgeman (3,572)	–	
Most goals	(Israel) Alon Turgeman (19)	–	
Winning rate	40.82%	54.17%	28%

Last updated: 21 May 2014
Source: Competitive matches
