= 2013–14 Israeli Premier League =

Israeli Premier League
- Season: 2013–14
- Dates: 24 August 2013 – 17 May 2014
- Champions: Maccabi Tel Aviv
- Relegated: Hapoel Ramat HaSharon; Bnei Yehuda
- Champions League: Maccabi Tel Aviv (Second qualifying round)
- Europa League: Ironi Kiryat Shmona (Third qualifying round); Hapoel Be'er Sheva & Hapoel Tel Aviv (Second qualifying round)
- Matches: 240
- Goals: 606 (2.53 per match)
- Top goalscorer: Eran Zahavi (29)
- Biggest home win: Maccabi Tel Aviv 5–0 Hapoel Ironi Acre
- Biggest away win: Hapoel Ramat HaSharon 0–5 Hapoel Tel Aviv
- Highest scoring: F.C. Ashdod 4–5 Hapoel Tel Aviv
- Longest winning run: 7 games Maccabi Tel Aviv
- Longest losing run: 7 games Hapoel Ramat HaSharon
- Average attendance: 5,065

The 2013–14 Israeli Premier League was the fifteenth season since its introduction in 1999 and the 72nd season of top-tier football in Israel. It began on 24 August 2013 and ended on 17 May 2014. Maccabi Tel Aviv were the defending champions, having won their second Premier League title, and 19th championship last season. They successfully defended their title this season.

== Teams ==
Locations of the 2013–14 Israeli Premier League teams

A total of fourteen teams are competing in the league, including twelve sides from the 2012–13 season and two promoted team from the 2012–13 Liga Leumit.

Maccabi Netanya and Hapoel Ramat Gan were relegated to the 2013–14 Liga Leumit after finishing the 2012–13 season in the bottom two places.

Maccabi Petah Tikva and Hapoel Ra'anana were promoted after finishing the 2012–13 Liga Leumit in the top two places.

Club	Home City	Stadium	Capacity
Beitar Jerusalem	Jerusalem	Teddy Stadium	31,733
Bnei Sakhnin	Sakhnin	Doha Stadium	8,500
Bnei Yehuda	Tel Aviv	Bloomfield Stadium^{[A]}	14,413
F.C. Ashdod	Ashdod	Yud-Alef Stadium	7,800
Hapoel Ironi Acre	Acre	Acre Municipal Stadium	5,000
Hapoel Be'er Sheva	Be'er Sheva	Vasermil Stadium	13,000
Hapoel Haifa	Haifa	Kiryat Eliezer Stadium	14,002
Hapoel Ra'anana	Ra'anana	Netanya Stadium^{[A]}	13,610
Hapoel Ramat HaSharon	Ramat HaSharon	Grundman Stadium	4,300
Hapoel Tel Aviv	Tel Aviv	Bloomfield Stadium	14,413
Ironi Kiryat Shmona	Kiryat Shmona	Ironi Stadium	5,300
Maccabi Haifa	Haifa	Kiryat Eliezer Stadium	14,002
Maccabi Petah Tikva	Petah Tikva	HaMoshava Stadium	11,500
Maccabi Tel Aviv	Tel Aviv	Bloomfield Stadium	14,413

A: The club will play their home games at a neutral venue because their own ground does not meet Premier League requirements.

Beitar Jerusalem	Bnei Yehuda Hapoel Tel Aviv Maccabi Tel Aviv	Ironi Kiryat Shmona	Hapoel Acre
Teddy Stadium	Bloomfield Stadium	Kiryat Shmona Stadium	Acre Stadium
Hapoel Ra'anana	Hapoel Haifa Maccabi Haifa	Maccabi Petah Tikva	Hapoel Ramat HaSharon
Netanya Stadium	Kiryat Eliezer Stadium	HaMoshava Stadium	Grundman Stadium
F.C. Ashdod	Bnei Sakhnin	Hapoel Be'er Sheva	
Yud-Alef Stadium	Doha Stadium	Vasermil Stadium	

=== Personnel and sponsorship ===
Team	President	Manager	Captain	Kitmaker	Shirt sponsor
Beitar Jerusalem	(Israel) Eli Tabib	(Israel) Ronny Levy	(Israel) Ariel Harush	Diadora	Eldad Perry Group
Bnei Sakhnin	(Israel) Mohammed Abu Yunes	(Israel) Marco Balbul	(Israel) Khaled Khalaila	Lotto	Toyga
Bnei Yehuda	(Israel) Moshe Damaio	(Israel) Yossi Abukasis	(Israel) Kfir Edri	Macron	Super Ceramic
F.C. Ashdod	(Israel) Jacky Ben-Zaken	(Israel) Nir Klinger	(Israel) Guy Tzarfati	Legea	Radio Jerusalem
Hapoel Ironi Acre	(Israel) Yehuda Barshishat	(Israel) Yuval Naim	(Israel) David Goresh	Nike	Azrieli Group
Hapoel Be'er Sheva	(Israel) Alona Barkat	(Israel) Elisha Levy	(Israel) Elyaniv Barda	Kappa	Mobli
Hapoel Haifa	(Israel) Yoav Katz	(Israel) Shlomi Dora	(Israel) Yossi Dora	Diadora	Hatama
Hapoel Ra'anana	(Israel) Ilan Katz	(Israel) Meni Koretski	(Israel) Tamir Cohen	Joma	ME Tel Aviv
Hapoel Ramat HaSharon	(Israel) Boaz Moldavsky	(Israel) Haim Shabo	(Israel) Kobi Musa	Lotto	Trade Mobile
Hapoel Tel Aviv	(Israel) Haim Ramon	(Israel) Ran Ben Shimon	(Israel) Shay Abutbul	Kappa	Fujicom
Ironi Kiryat Shmona	(Israel) Izzy Sheratzky	(Israel) Barak Bakhar	(Israel) Shir Tzedek	Puma	Ituran
Maccabi Haifa	(Israel) Ya'akov Shahar	(Israel) Arik Benado	(Israel) Yaniv Katan	Nike	Honda
Maccabi Petah Tikva	(Israel) Amos Luzon	(Israel) Yitav Luzon (Israel) Kobi Refua	(Israel) Omer Golan	Lotto	Panorama North
Maccabi Tel Aviv	(Canada) Mitchell Goldhar	(Portugal) Paulo Sousa	(Israel) Sheran Yeini	Macron	

=== Managerial changes ===
Team	Outgoing manager	Manner of departure	Date of vacancy	Table	Incoming manager	Date of appointment	Final position
Beitar Jerusalem	(Israel) Eli Cohen (b. 1951)	End of contract	4 May 2013	10th (12–13)	(Israel) Eli Cohen (b. 1961)	23 June 2013	10th
Hapoel Haifa	(Israel) Nir Klinger	End of contract	4 May 2013	9th (12–13)	(Israel) Shlomi Dora	23 May 2013	
F.C. Ashdod	(Israel) Yossi Mizrahi	End of contract	4 May 2013	7th (12–13)	(Israel) Nir Klinger	19 May 2013	
Hapoel Tel Aviv	(Israel) Freddy David	End of contract	18 May 2013	3rd (12–13)	(Israel) Ran Ben Shimon	20 May 2013	
Hapoel Ramat HaSharon	(Israel) Benny Tabak	Sacked	21 May 2013	6th (12–13)	(Israel) Rafi Cohen	21 May 2013	14th
Maccabi Tel Aviv	(Spain) Óscar García	Resigned	22 May 2013	1st (12–13)	(Portugal) Paulo Sousa	12 June 2013	
Hapoel Ramat HaSharon	(Israel) Rafi Cohen	Sacked	22 September 2013	14th	(Israel) Haim Shabo (caretaker)	22 September 2013	
Maccabi Petah Tikva	(Israel) Moshe Sinai	Resigned	24 November 2013	12th	(Israel) Yitav Luzon^{[C]}	24 November 2013	
Maccabi Petah Tikva	(Israel) Moshe Sinai	Resigned	24 November 2013	13th	(Israel) Kobi Refua	19 December 2013	
Bnei Yehuda	(Israel) Dror Kashtan	Resigned	1 December 2013	14th	(Israel) Yaakov Asayag (caretaker)	1 December 2013	14th
Beitar Jerusalem	(Israel) Eli Cohen (b. 1961)	Sacked	3 December 2013	10th	(Israel) David Amsalem (caretaker)	3 December 2013	11th
Beitar Jerusalem	(Israel) David Amsalem (caretaker)	End of caretaker spell	9 December 2013	11th	(Israel) Ronny Levy	9 December 2013	
Bnei Yehuda	(Israel) Yaakov Asayag (caretaker)	End of caretaker spell	22 December 2013	14th	(Israel) Yossi Abukasis	22 December 2013	

^C Yitav Luzon was Maccabi Petah Tikva sole manager until 19 December 2013, when Kobi Refua was appointed as joint-manager alongside him.

=== Foreign players ===
Club	Player 1	Player 2	Player 3	Player 4	Player 5	Non-visa Foreign	Former Players
Beitar Jerusalem	(Argentina) **Pablo Brandán**	(Brazil) Bryan	(Serbia) **Dušan Matović**	(Spain) **Jonathan Vila**	(Venezuela) Andrés Túñez		(Democratic Republic of the Congo) Landry Mulemo (Nigeria) Osa Guobadia (Sierra Leone) Teteh Bangura
Bnei Sahknin	(Spain) **Albert Crusat**	(Spain) Abraham Paz	(Spain) Cristian	(Spain) **Jorge Alonso**	(Spain) **Marc Fernández**		(Serbia) Marko Markovski
Bnei Yehuda	(Argentina) Emiliano Fusco	(England) **James Keene**	(Gibraltar) **Liam Walker**	(Nigeria) Dele Aiyenugba	(Lithuania) Kęstutis Ivaškevičius		(Hungary) Ádám Hrepka (Senegal) Yoro Lamine Ly
F.C. Ashdod	(Democratic Republic of the Congo) Paty Yeye Lenkebe	(France) **Gaëtan Varenne**	(Nigeria) Juwon Oshaniwa	(Nigeria) Yero Bello	(Serbia) Aleksandar Davidov		(Argentina) David Solari
Hapoel Ironi Acre	(Albania) **Hamdi Salihi**	(Brazil) Juliano Spadacio	(Croatia) Mirko Oremuš	(Serbia) Branislav Jovanović	(Serbia) Nenad Marinković	(France) Steven Cohen^{2}	(Brazil) Leandrão (Brazil) Leo Costa (Serbia) Srđa Knežević
Hapoel Be'er Sheva	(Belgium) **David Hubert**	(Brazil) William Soares	(Netherlands) Glynor Plet	(Nigeria) Austin Ejide	(Serbia) Tomislav Pajović	(Argentina) Nicolás Falczuk^{2}	(Bosnia and Herzegovina) Bojan Marković
Hapoel Haifa	(Argentina) Darío Fernández	(Lithuania) Tadas Kijanskas	(Montenegro) Žarko Korać	(Serbia) Danilo Nikolić		(Croatia) Tvrtko Kale^{2}	(Serbia) Nebojša Marinković
Hapoel Ra'anana	(Brazil) **Liliu**	(Nigeria) Anthony Nwakaeme	(Senegal) Mamadou Thiam	(Zambia) Emmanuel Mbola	(Zambia) **Francis Kasonde**		(Brazil) Eudis
Hapoel Ramat HaSharon	(Bosnia and Herzegovina) Emir Hadžić	(Serbia) Aleksandar Đoković				(Palestine) Fadi Zidan^{2} (United States) Kenny Saief^{2}	(Bosnia and Herzegovina) Jadranko Bogičević (Ethiopia) Asrat Megersa
Hapoel Tel Aviv	(Brazil) Lucas Sasha	(Montenegro) **Petar Orlandić**	(Netherlands) Jürgen Colin	(North Macedonia) Besart Abdurahimi	(Slovenia) Branko Ilić	(United States) Bryan Gerzicich^{1}	
Ironi Kiryat Shmona	(Brazil) Kassio	(Central African Republic) David Manga	(Lithuania) Mindaugas Panka	(Zambia) **Rodgers Kola**			(North Macedonia) Darko Tasevski (Serbia) Dušan Matović
Maccabi Haifa	(Bosnia and Herzegovina) Edin Cocalić	(Hungary) **Tamás Priskin**	(Serbia) Bojan Šaranov	(Spain) Rubén Rayos	(Ukraine) Andriy Pylyavskyi	(Brazil) Gustavo Boccoli^{1}	(South Africa) Dino Ndlovu
Maccabi Petah Tikva	(Argentina) Pedro Galván	(Croatia) Ivan Herceg	(Finland) **Erfan Zeneli**	(Ivory Coast) Zito	(Montenegro) **Luka Rotković**		(Croatia) Bojan Đukić (Nigeria) Emmanuel Ogude
Maccabi Tel Aviv	(Martinique) **Rémi Maréval**	(Serbia) Nikola Mitrović	(Spain) Carlos García	(Spain) Juan Pablo	(Sweden) Rade Prica	(Hungary) Marcell Illés^{2}	(Spain) Mané

In bold: Players that join the club mid-season

In Italic: Players that left the club mid-season

The following do not fill a Visa position:
^{1}Players who were born and started their professional career abroad but have since gained an Israeli passport or permanent residency, allowing them to play with Israeli status;
^{2}Players who were born and started their professional career abroad but are eligible for Israeli citizenship due to Jewish ancestry;

^{3}Israeli citizens who have chosen to represent another national team;

== Regular season ==
=== Table ===
Pos	Team	Pld	W	D	L	GF	GA	GD	Pts	Qualification
1	Maccabi Tel Aviv	26	21	3	2	58	18	+40	66	Qualification for the championship round
2	Hapoel Be'er Sheva	26	18	5	3	48	19	+29	59	Qualification for the championship round
3	Ironi Kiryat Shmona	26	12	8	6	38	26	+12	44	Qualification for the championship round
4	Maccabi Haifa	26	13	5	8	39	30	+9	44	Qualification for the championship round
5	Bnei Sakhnin	26	11	7	8	30	25	+5	40	Qualification for the championship round
6	Hapoel Tel Aviv	26	11	6	9	51	38	+13	39	Qualification for the championship round
7	F.C. Ironi Ashdod	26	8	7	11	28	35	−7	31	Qualification for the relegation round
8	Hapoel Haifa	26	8	7	11	27	34	−7	31	Qualification for the relegation round
9	Beitar Jerusalem	26	8	6	12	21	28	−7	30	Qualification for the relegation round
10	Hapoel Acre	26	6	9	11	24	37	−13	27	Qualification for the relegation round
11	Hapoel Ra'anana	26	6	8	12	20	33	−13	26	Qualification for the relegation round
12	Maccabi Petah Tikva	26	5	8	13	28	45	−17	23	Qualification for the relegation round
13	Bnei Yehuda	26	4	8	14	26	39	−13	20	Qualification for the relegation round
14	Hapoel Ramat HaSharon	26	5	5	16	21	52	−31	20	Qualification for the relegation round

Source: Israel Football Association
Rules for classification: 1st points; 2nd goal difference; 3rd matches won; 4th goals scored; 5th head-to-head; 6th decision match. Winners of 2013–14 Israel State Cup qualify for the second qualifying round of the UEFA Europa League.

=== Results ===
Home \ Away	BEI	BnY	BnS	ASH	HAC	HBS	HHA	HRA	HRH	HTA	IKS	MHA	MPT	MTA
Beitar Jerusalem	—	2–1	0–1	2–0	1–0	0–2	0–1	1–1	0–1	1–0	1–4	1–0	1–0	1–2
Bnei Yehuda	0–0	—	2–4	1–0	1–0	1–2	2–2	0–0	0–1	2–2	0–0	0–2	2–4	0–2
Bnei Sakhnin	0–0	0–1	—	2–1	1–0	0–4	2–0	2–0	1–1	4–0	1–1	0–0	0–2	0–2
F.C. Ironi Ashdod	1–0	1–0	0–0	—	0–0	2–2	1–0	1–2	3–0	4–5	2–1	3–2	2–0	0–0
Hapoel Acre	0–0	3–2	0–2	1–1	—	1–2	2–1	0–0	4–3	2–1	2–1	1–1	1–3	0–2
Hapoel Be'er Sheva	2–0	2–1	2–1	2–0	1–1	—	1–0	0–0	0–0	2–0	0–2	3–1	3–0	3–2
Hapoel Haifa	2–2	2–1	2–0	1–1	0–0	1–3	—	1–1	3–0	0–4	2–0	0–1	0–1	1–3
Hapoel Ra'anana	2–2	0–2	0–1	3–0	1–3	1–0	0–2	—	1–2	1–4	0–2	1–0	1–0	0–2
Hapoel Ramat HaSharon	0–2	1–0	0–1	2–3	1–1	0–4	0–2	1–3	—	0–5	0–2	1–2	2–0	0–3
Hapoel Tel Aviv	3–1	2–2	0–0	2–1	2–0	1–3	4–0	0–0	3–0	—	1–1	2–4	3–1	2–3
Ironi Kiryat Shmona	1–0	2–1	1–1	1–0	2–0	0–1	2–0	0–0	4–1	2–2	—	2–1	0–0	3–1
Maccabi Haifa	2–0	2–2	2–1	2–1	2–1	0–0	0–1	3–1	1–1	3–1	3–1	—	1–0	0–3
Maccabi Petah Tikva	1–3	2–2	1–3	1–1	1–1	1–3	1–1	1–0	3–3	0–2	3–3	0–3	—	0–2
Maccabi Tel Aviv	1–0	1–0	4–1	2–0	5–0	3–1	2–2	3–1	1–0	1–0	3–0	3–1	2–2	—

Source: Israel Football Association
Legend: Blue = home team win; Yellow = draw; Red = away team win.

== Playoffs ==
Key numbers for pairing determination (number marks position after 26 games):

Rounds
27th	28th	29th	30th	31st	32nd	33rd	34th	35th	36th
1 – 6; 2 – 5; 3 – 4	1 – 2; 5 – 3; 6 – 4	2 – 6; 3 – 1; 4 – 5	1 – 4; 2 – 3; 6 – 5	3 – 6; 4 – 2; 5 – 1	6 – 1; 5 – 2; 4 – 3	2 – 1; 3 – 5; 4 – 6	6 – 2; 1 – 3; 5 – 4	3 – 2; 4 – 1; 5 – 6	6 – 3; 2 – 4; 1 – 5
7 – 14; 8 – 13; 9 – 12; 10 – 11	7 – 8; 13 – 9; 12 – 10; 14 – 11	8 – 14; 9 – 7; 10 – 13; 11 – 12	8 – 9; 7 – 10; 13 – 11; 14 – 12	9 – 14; 10 – 8; 11 – 7; 12 – 13	9 – 10; 8 – 11; 7 – 12; 14 – 13	10 – 14; 11 – 9; 12 – 8; 13 – 7			

=== Top playoff ===
==== Table ====
Pos	Team	Pld	W	D	L	GF	GA	GD	Pts	Qualification
1	Maccabi Tel Aviv (C)	36	26	6	4	76	30	+46	84	Qualification for the Champions League second qualifying round
2	Hapoel Be'er Sheva	36	20	8	8	56	33	+23	68	Qualification for the Europa League second qualifying round (Note: Since Ironi Kiryat Shmona won the 2013–14 Israel State Cup, then the 4th-positioned team will be awarded with entry to the second qualifying round of the UEFA Europa League.)
3	Ironi Kiryat Shmona	36	18	10	8	59	38	+21	64	Qualification for the Europa League third qualifying round
4	Hapoel Tel Aviv	36	16	10	10	72	47	+25	58	Qualification for the Europa League second qualifying round
5	Maccabi Haifa	36	15	8	13	49	46	+3	53	
6	Bnei Sakhnin	36	13	8	15	37	47	−10	47	

Source: Israel Football Association
Rules for classification: 1st points; 2nd goal difference; 3rd matches won; 4th goals scored; 5th head-to-head; 6th decision match
(C) Champions

==== Results ====
Home \ Away	BnS	HBS	HTA	IKS	MHA	MTA
Bnei Sakhnin	—	0–0	1–3	1–4	0–2	2–1
Hapoel Be'er Sheva	2–0	—	1–2	0–2	1–1	1–2
Hapoel Tel Aviv	3–0	1–2	—	4–2	4–0	3–1
Ironi Kiryat Shmona	2–0	3–0	1–1	—	1–0	2–2
Maccabi Haifa	1–2	2–1	1–1	1–3	—	2–2
Maccabi Tel Aviv	4–1	2–0	0–0	3–1	1–0	—

Source: Israel Football Association
Legend: Blue = home team win; Yellow = draw; Red = away team win.

=== Bottom playoff ===
==== Table ====
Pos	Team	Pld	W	D	L	GF	GA	GD	Pts	Relegation
7	Beitar Jerusalem	33	12	6	15	31	32	−1	42	
8	F.C. Ironi Ashdod	33	10	9	14	35	45	−10	39	
9	Hapoel Ra'anana	33	9	11	13	31	40	−9	38	
10	Hapoel Acre	33	8	12	13	30	42	−12	36	
11	Hapoel Haifa	33	9	7	17	30	45	−15	34	
12	Maccabi Petah Tikva	33	8	9	16	39	57	−18	33	
13	Hapoel Ramat HaSharon (R)	33	9	6	18	29	59	−30	33	Relegation to Liga Leumit
14	Bnei Yehuda (R)	33	7	10	16	32	45	−13	31	Relegation to Liga Leumit

Source: Israel Football Association
Rules for classification: 1st points; 2nd goal difference; 3rd matches won; 4th goals scored; 5th head-to-head; 6th decision match
(R) Relegated

==== Results ====
Home \ Away	BEI	BnY	ASH	HAC	HHA	HRA	HRH	MPT
Beitar Jerusalem	—	—	1–0	0–2	—	—	4–0	3–0
Bnei Yehuda	1–0	—	1–1	—	—	1–3	—	—
F.C. Ironi Ashdod	—	—	—	1–0	4–1	—	0–1	0–5
Hapoel Acre	—	1–1	—	—	1–0	1–1	1–2	—
Hapoel Haifa	1–0	0–1	—	—	—	0–2	0–1	—
Hapoel Ra'anana	0–2	—	1–1	—	—	—	—	4–2
Hapoel Ramat HaSharon	—	0–1	—	—	—	0–0	—	4–1
Maccabi Petah Tikva	—	1–0	—	0–0	2–1	—	—	—

Source: Israel Football Association
Legend: Blue = home team win; Yellow = draw; Red = away team win.

== Season statistics ==
=== Top scorers ===
Rank	Scorer	Club	Goals
1	(Israel) Eran Zahavi	Maccabi Tel Aviv	29
2	(Israel) Omer Damari	Hapoel Tel Aviv	26
3	(Israel) Alon Turgeman	Maccabi Haifa	15
4	(Sweden) Rade Prica	Maccabi Tel Aviv	12
5	(Central African Republic) David Manga	Ironi Kiryat Shmona	11
5	(Montenegro) Žarko Korać	Hapoel Haifa	11
5	(Israel) Mohammed Kalibat	Bnei Sakhnin	11
5	(Spain) Rubén Rayos	Maccabi Haifa	11
5	(Netherlands) Glynor Plet	Hapoel Be'er Sheva	11
10	(Israel) Maor Buzaglo	Hapoel Be'er Sheva	10
Total			606
Average per game			2.53

Updated: 17 May 2014
Source: Israel Football Association

=== Scoring ===
- First goal of the season: (Israel) Barak Yitzhaki for Maccabi Tel Aviv against Hapoel Ironi Acre, 1st minute (24 August 2013)
- Biggest winning margin: 5 goals –
  - Hapoel Ramat HaSharon 0–5 Hapoel Tel Aviv (26 October 2013)
  - Maccabi Tel Aviv 5–0 Hapoel Ironi Acre (21 December 2013)
- Most goals scored by a losing team: 4 goals – F.C. Ashdod 4–5 Hapoel Tel Aviv (8 March 2014)
- Most goals in a match by one player: 3 goals -
  - (Israel) Itay Shechter for Hapoel Tel Aviv against Hapoel Ramat HaSharon (26 October 2013)
  - (Montenegro) Žarko Korać for Hapoel Haifa against Hapoel Ramat HaSharon (21 December 2013)
  - (Israel) Dovev Gabay for Hapoel Be'er Sheva against Hapoel Tel Aviv (30 December 2013)
  - (Israel) Eran Zahavi for Maccabi Tel Aviv against Hapoel Tel Aviv (17 March 2014)
  - (Israel) Eran Zahavi for Maccabi Tel Aviv against Bnei Sakhnin (17 May 2014)

=== Discipline ===
- First yellow card of the season: (Israel) Amiya Taga for Hapoel Ironi Acre against Maccabi Tel Aviv, 7th minute (24 August 2013)
- Most yellow cards by a player: 10
  - (Israel) Ali Ottman (Bnei Sakhnin)
- First red card of the season: (Ethiopia) Asrat Megersa for Hapoel Ramat HaSharon against Hapoel Haifa, 41st minute (24 August 2013)
- Most red cards by a player: 2
  - (Israel) Ahad Azam (Hapoel Haifa)
  - (Israel) Yossi Dora (Hapoel Haifa)
  - (Israel) Ben Reichert (Hapoel Ramat HaSharon)
  - (Israel) Khaled Khalaila (Bnei Sakhnin)
  - (Ivory Coast) Zito (Maccabi Petah Tikva)

=== Clean sheets ===
- Most clean sheets: 18
  - Maccabi Tel Aviv
- Fewest clean sheets: 1
  - Maccabi Petah Tikva

=== Attendance ===
- Highest Attendance: 30,000
  - Round 6 - Beitar Jerusalem vs. Hapoel Tel Aviv (22 October 2013) at Teddy Stadium. This is the highest attendance of an Israeli Premier League regular season game since 1993. This game is also the highest attendance of a regular Premier League game outside of Ramat Gan Stadium.Source:

No.	Club	Average attendance
1	Maccabi Tel Aviv	11,195
2	Maccabi Haifa	10,626
3	Hapoel Tel Aviv	8,767
4	Beitar Jerusalem	7,917
5	Maccabi Netanya	5,146
6	Hapoel Haifa	4,601
7	Hapoel Be'er-Sheva	4,534
8	Bnei Yehuda Tel Aviv	4,314
9	Bnei Sakhnin	3,106
10	Hapoel Ironi Acre	2,399
11	Hapoel Ironi Kiryat Shmona	2,233
12	Ashdod	2,040
13	Hapoel Ramat Gan	1,848
14	Ironi Nir Ramat HaSharon	1,202

== See also ==
- 2013–14 Israel State Cup
