= Ladji =

Ladji is both a given name and a surname. Notable people with the name include:

- Ladji Diakité, Malian filmmaker
- Ladji Doucouré (born 1983), French track and field athlete
- Ladji Keita (born 1983), Senegalese footballer
- Ladji Mallé (born 2001), Malian footballer
- Mekeme Tamla Ladji (born 1985), Ivorian footballer
