= Sari Falah =

Israeli footballer (born 1991)

Sari Falah ساري فلاح
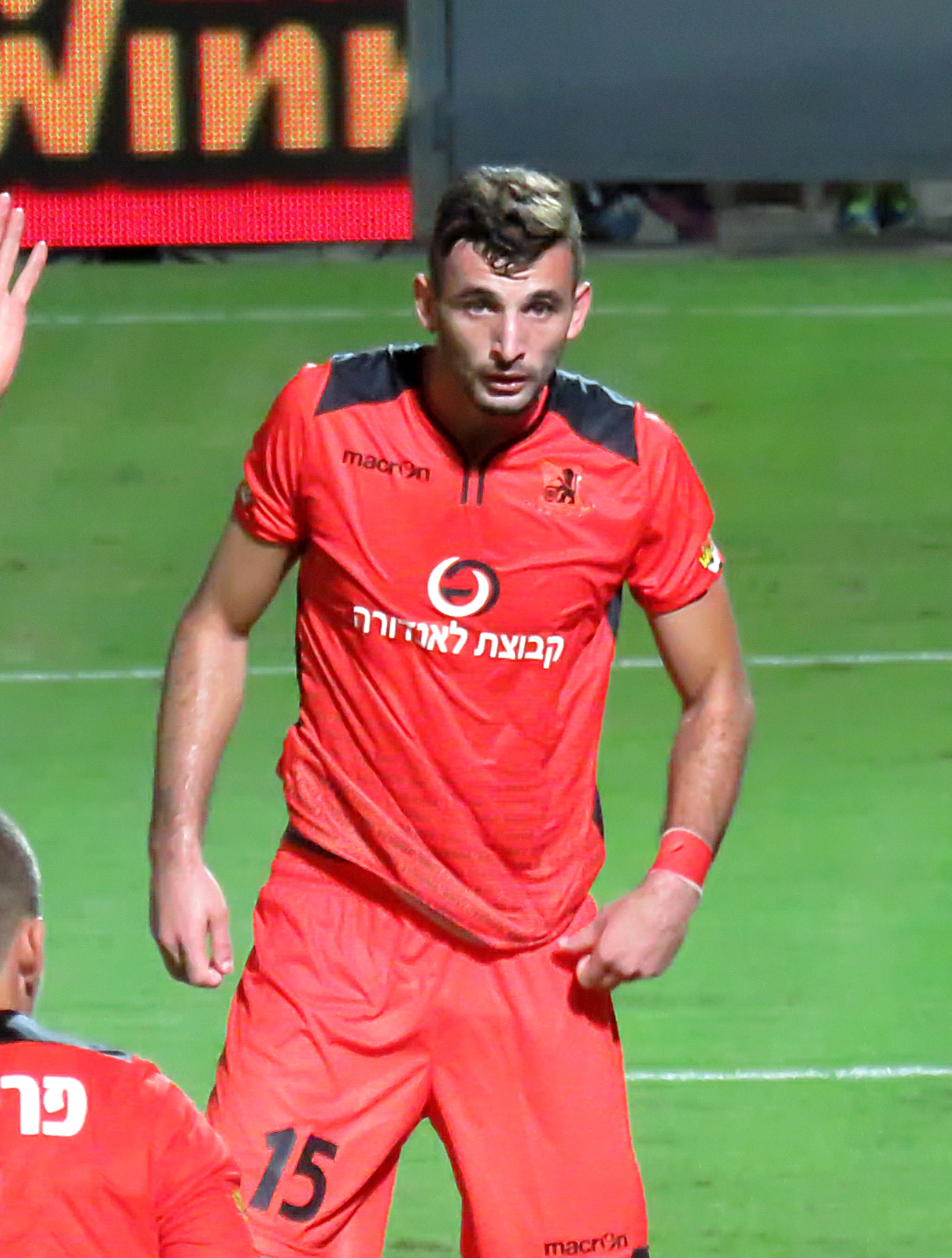
- Falah playing for Bnei Yehuda Tel Aviv in 2015

Personal information
- Date of birth: 22 November 1991 (age 34)
- Place of birth: Kisra-Sumei, Israel
- Height: 1.91 m (6 ft 3 in)
- Position: Centre-back

Team information
- Current team: Bnei Sakhnin

Youth career
- 2007–2009: Bnei Sakhnin
- 2009–2010: Maccabi Haifa

Senior career*
Years	Team	Apps	(Gls)
2009–2014	Maccabi Haifa	44	(2)
2012–2013	→ Bnei Yehuda (loan)	16	(2)
2014–2015	Hapoel Tel Aviv	26	(1)
2015–2016	Bnei Yehuda Tel Aviv	19	(1)
2016–2021	Bnei Sakhnin	102	(4)

International career
2009	Israel U18	2	(0)
2009	Israel U19	16	(1)
2011–2013	Israel U21	16	(0)
Medal record
Representing Israel
Football
Maccabiah Games
Bronze medal – third place	2009 Maccabiah	Football
- * Club domestic league appearances and goals as of 28 May 2021

Sari Falah (Arabic: ساري فلاح, Hebrew: סארי פלאח; born 22 November 1991) is an Israeli professional footballer who plays as a centre-back for Bnei Sakhnin.

== Early life ==
Falah was born in the Druze-Arab village of Kisra-Sumei, Israel.

== Club career ==
Falah made his professional debut, coming on as a substitute for Vladimir Dvalishvili, in a 0–0 Toto Cup draw against Hapoel Be'er Sheva on 11 November 2009.

In 2011–12 season, following the injury of Andriy Pylyavskyi, Falah grabbed first place in the first team and has become an important part in the formation of the Maccabi Haifa coach Elisha Levy, but later lost his place in the composition to Edin Cocalić that was brought in January. At the end of the season, Falah was determined to leave Maccabi Haifa, while still under contract with her. Is absent from the opening training and in summer 2012 under the advice of agent Dudu Dahan Falah signed a contract with Romanian team, though Haifa did not release it. Maccabi Haifa also announced channel to handle disciplinary problems and in the legal and submit complaint to FIFA Falah was loaned eventually to Bnei Yehuda.

In January 2013, in the game against Beitar Jerusalem in Teddy Stadium, Falah broke his ankle, Following injury Falah been away from the field for a long period.

== International career ==
Falah represented Israel at the 2009 Maccabiah Games, winning a bronze medal.

Falah was part of the Israel national under-21 football team, but following his injury he missed the 2013 UEFA European Under-21 Football Championship.

== Club career statistics ==
(correct as of 1 August 2014)

Club	Season	League			Cup			Toto Cup			Europe			Total		
Club	Season	Apps	Goals	Assists	Apps	Goals	Assists	Apps	Goals	Assists	Apps	Goals	Assists	Apps	Goals	Assists
Maccabi Haifa	2010–11	1	0	0	1	0	0	4	0	0	0	0	0	6	0	0
Maccabi Haifa	2011–12	22	2	1	2	0	0	3	0	0	8	0	0	35	2	1
Bnei Yehuda	2012–13	16	2	0	0	0	0	0	0	0	0	0	0	16	2	0
Maccabi Haifa	2013–14	21	0	0	1	0	0	0	0	0	1	0	0	23	0	0
Hapoel Tel Aviv	2014–15	26	1	0	0	0	0	0	0	0	0	0	0	26	1	0
Career		60	4	1	4	0	0	7	0	0	9	0	0	90	4	1

== See also ==
- List of Israeli Druze
