= Elad Gabai =

Israeli association footballer

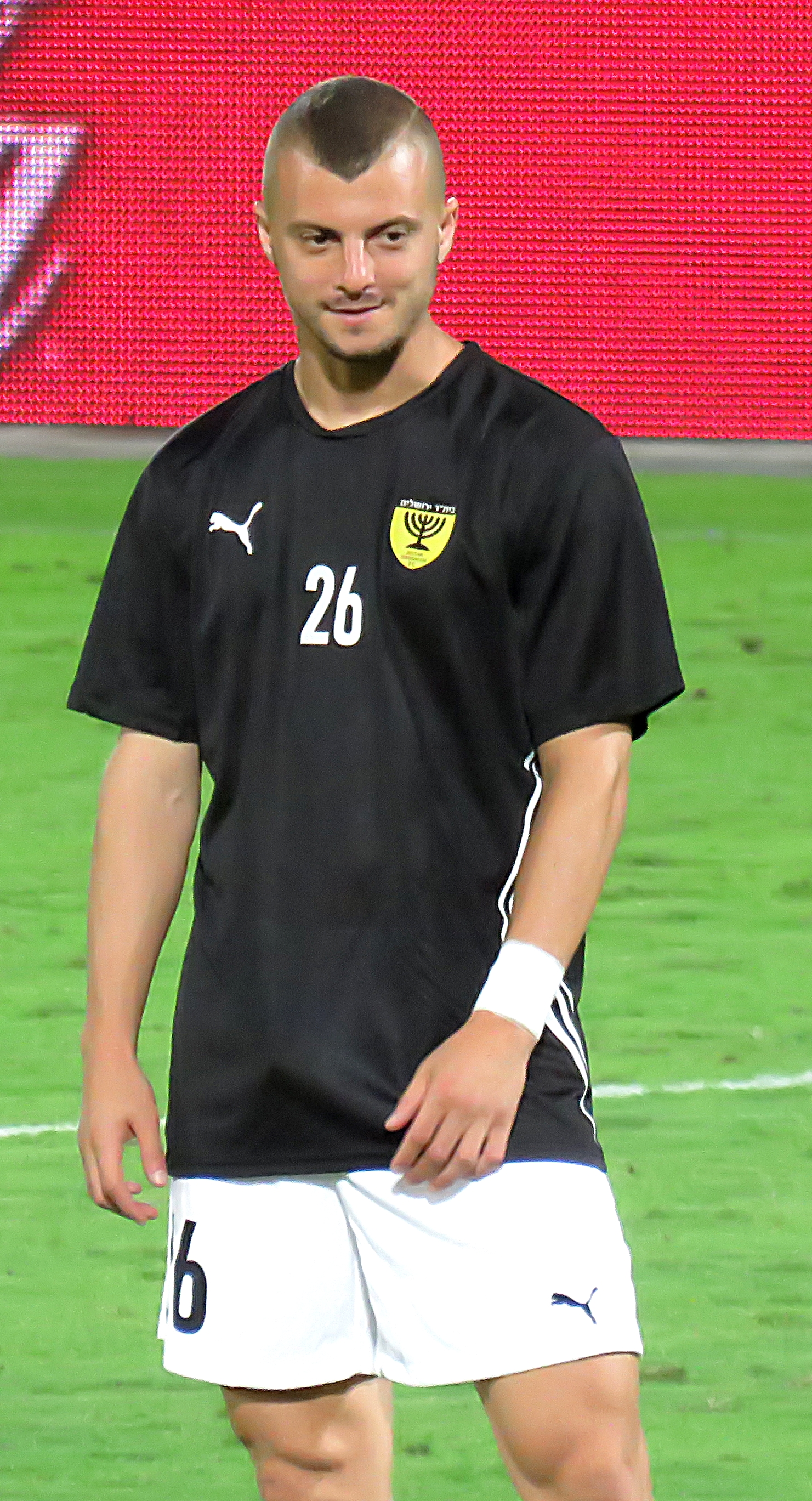
- Gabai playing for Beitar Jerusalem in 2015

Personal information
- Full name: Elad Gabai
- Date of birth: 15 November 1985 (age 40)
- Place of birth: Rishon LeZion, Israel
- Height: 1.75 m (5 ft 9 in)
- Position: Right back

Youth career
- 1991–2003: Bnei Yehuda Tel Aviv

Senior career*
Years	Team	Apps	(Gls)
2003–2004	Bnei Yehuda Tel Aviv	1	(0)
2004–2006	→ Hapoel Marmorek (loan)		
2006–2010	Hapoel Bnei Lod	119	(1)
2010–2013	Hapoel Ironi Kiryat Shmona	97	(1)
2013–2015	Maccabi Haifa	14	(0)
2015–2016	Beitar Jerusalem	28	(1)
2016–2017	Hapoel Ra'anana	20	(0)
2017–2018	Hapoel Ashkelon	7	(0)
2018–2019	Hapoel Petah Tikva	13	(0)
2019–2020	Maccabi Yavne	0	(0)

International career
2012–2014	Israel	6	(0)
- * Club domestic league appearances and goals

Elad Gabai (or Gabay, Hebrew: אלעד גבאי; born 15 November 1985) is a former Israeli professional footballer who played as a right back.

== Early life ==
Gabai was born in Rishon LeZion, Israel, to a Jewish family.

== Club career ==
Gabai has played club football for Bnei Yehuda Tel Aviv, Hapoel Marmorek, Hapoel Bnei Lod and Hapoel Ironi Kiryat Shmona.

He moved to Maccabi Haifa in June 2013.

He spent time in 2018–19 with Hapoel Petah Tikva.

== International career ==
He made his senior international debut for Israel in 2012.

== See also ==
- List of Jewish footballers
- List of Jews in sports
- List of Israelis
