= Rubén Rayos =

Spanish footballer

Rayo
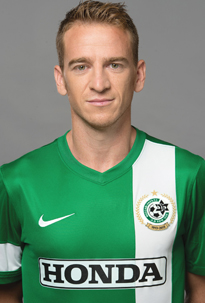
- Rayo as a Maccabi Haifa player (2013)

Personal information
- Full name: Rubén Rayos Serna
- Date of birth: 21 June 1986 (age 40)
- Place of birth: Elche, Spain
- Height: 1.76 m (5 ft 9 in)
- Position: Attacking midfielder

Youth career
- Elche

Senior career*
| Years | Team | Apps | (Gls) |
| 2005–2006 | Elche B | | |
| 2006–2008 | Elche | 0 | (0) |
| 2006–2008 | → Villajoyosa (loan) | 62 | (20) |
| 2008–2009 | Barcelona B | 23 | (0) |
| 2009–2010 | Orihuela | 35 | (11) |
| 2010–2011 | Lleida | 33 | (19) |
| 2011–2013 | Asteras Tripolis | 62 | (12) |
| 2013–2015 | Maccabi Haifa | 54 | (17) |
| 2015–2016 | Sochaux | 12 | (0) |
| 2016–2020 | Anorthosis | 111 | (30) |
| 2020–2021 | Bandırmaspor | 23 | (5) |
| 2022 | Ejea | 12 | (2) |
| Total | | 427 | (116) |
- * Club domestic league appearances and goals

Rubén Rayos Serna (born 21 June 1986), commonly known as Rayo, is a Spanish former professional footballer who played as an attacking midfielder.

== Club career ==
Rayo was born in Elche, Valencian Community. He finished his youth career with Elche CF, and played only Segunda División B football until the age of 25, representing Villajoyosa CF, FC Barcelona Atlètic, Orihuela CF and UE Lleida.

In the summer of 2011, Rayo moved straight into the Super League Greece, joining a host of compatriots at Asteras Tripolis FC. He scored five league goals in his first season, adding three in the campaign's domestic cup.

Rayo improved his overall totals to nine goals and 12 assists in 2012–13. In the final of the Greek Cup, against Olympiacos FC, he put his team ahead 1–0 in an eventual 3–1 extra time loss. He was eventually chosen Best Foreign Player for his exploits and, during most of his spell, was also captain.

On 6 June 2013, Rayo signed a three-year contract with Maccabi Haifa FC, netting 11 goals from 27 appearances in his first year to help his new club to fourth position in the regular season of the Israeli Premier League. In March 2014, he was involved in an incident with Bnei Yehuda Tel Aviv FC's Rafi Dahan, his harsh tackle producing an anterior cruciate ligament injury to his opponent which sidelined him for almost one year – he received a straight red card, and Dahan was eventually forced to retire; subsequently, Dahan filed a lawsuit against Rayo and Maccabi Haifa in an Israeli court, winning the legal action after the judge ruled that the other player's actions were deliberate.

On 8 July 2015, Rayo joined French side FC Sochaux-Montbéliard, agreeing to a two-year deal for an undisclosed fee. Roughly one year later, he moved to Anorthosis Famagusta FC in the Cypriot First Division.

Before retiring aged 36, Rayo represented Bandırmaspor in the Turkish TFF 1. Lig and Spanish amateurs SD Ejea.

== Career statistics ==
As of 9 March 2020

Appearances and goals by club, season and competition
| Club | Season | League | | | Cup | | Continental | | Other | | Total | |
| Club | Season | Division | Apps | Goals | Apps | Goals | Apps | Goals | Apps | Goals | Apps | Goals |
|---|---|---|---|---|---|---|---|---|---|---|---|---|
| Asteras Tripolis | 2011–12 | Super League Greece | 27 | 5 | 4 | 3 | — | | — | | 31 | 8 |
| Asteras Tripolis | 2012–13 | Super League Greece | 35 | 7 | 9 | 2 | 4 | 1 | — | | 48 | 10 |
| Asteras Tripolis | Total | | 62 | 12 | 13 | 5 | 4 | 1 | 0 | 0 | 79 | 18 |
| Maccabi Haifa | 2013–14 | Israeli Premier League | 27 | 11 | 1 | 0 | 12 | 6 | — | | 40 | 17 |
| Maccabi Haifa | 2014–15 | Israeli Premier League | 27 | 6 | 2 | 2 | — | | 6 | 4 | 35 | 12 |
| Maccabi Haifa | Total | | 54 | 17 | 3 | 2 | 12 | 6 | 6 | 4 | 75 | 29 |
| Sochaux | 2015–16 | Ligue 2 | 12 | 0 | 2 | 0 | — | | 2 | 0 | 16 | 0 |
| Anorthosis | 2016–17 | Cypriot First Division | 30 | 8 | 4 | 2 | — | | — | | 34 | 10 |
| Anorthosis | 2017–18 | Cypriot First Division | 34 | 5 | 2 | 0 | — | | — | | 36 | 5 |
| Anorthosis | 2018–19 | Cypriot First Division | 24 | 3 | 2 | 0 | 2 | 0 | — | | 28 | 3 |
| Anorthosis | 2019–20 | Cypriot First Division | 23 | 14 | 2 | 1 | — | | — | | 25 | 15 |
| Anorthosis | Total | | 111 | 30 | 10 | 3 | 2 | 0 | 0 | 0 | 123 | 33 |
| Career total | | | 239 | 59 | 28 | 10 | 18 | 7 | 8 | 4 | 293 | 80 |

== Honours ==
Asteras Tripolis

- Greek Football Cup runner-up: 2012–13

Individual

- Super League Greece Player of the Year: 2012–13
- Super League Greece Foreign Player of the Year: 2012–13
