= Yaakov Asayag =

Former Israeli footballer and goalkeeper

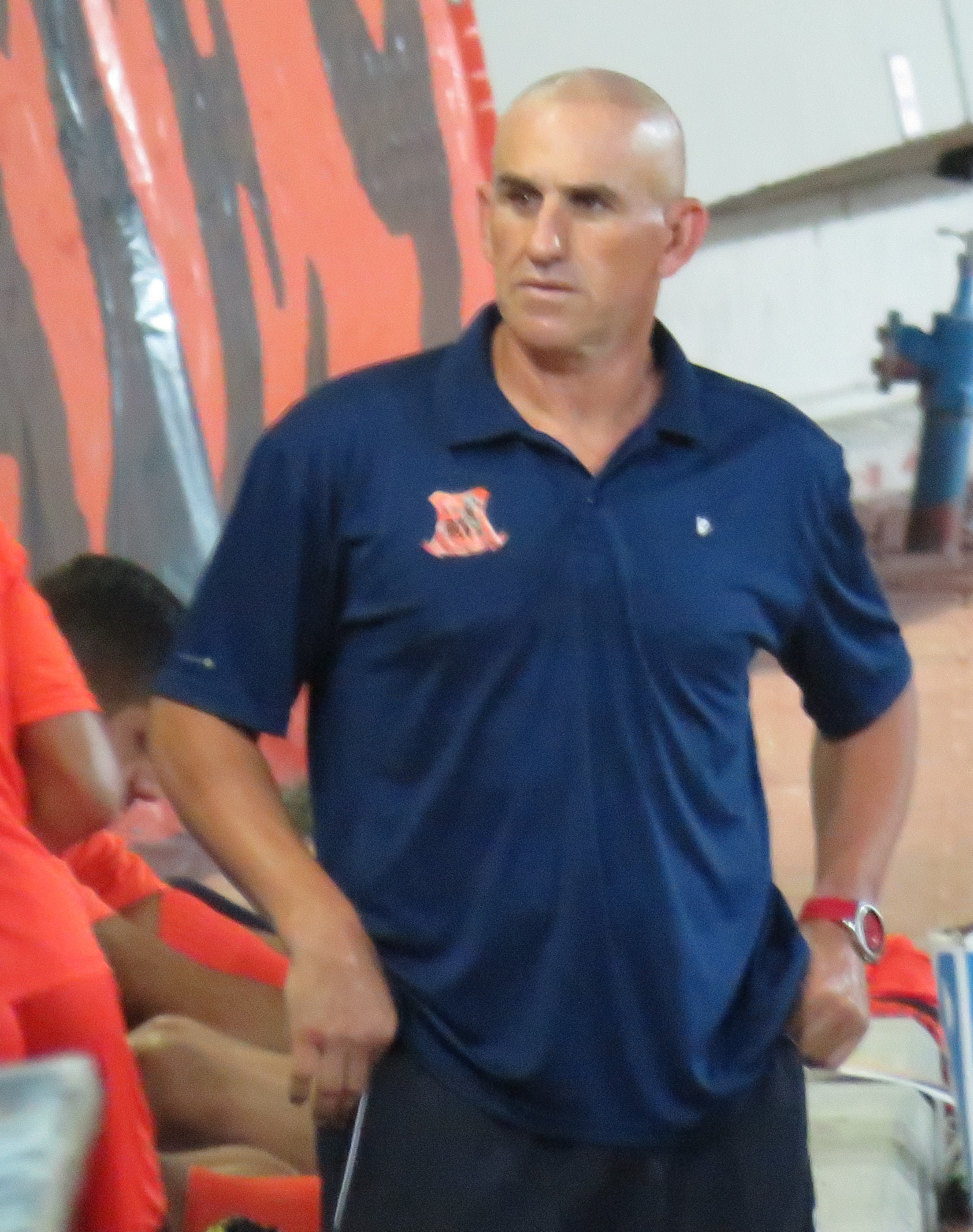

Personal information
- Date of birth: 1 March 1959 (age 67)
- Place of birth: Nof HaGalil, Israel
- Position: Goalkeeper

Team information
- Current team: Hapoel Kfar Shalem (Goalkeeping Coach)

Youth career
- Hapoel Nof HaGalil

Senior career*
Years	Team	Apps	(Gls)
1977-1978	Hapoel Nof HaGalil		
1978–1979	Bnei Yehuda	69	(0)
1979–1983	Hapoel Haifa		
1983–1992	Bnei Yehuda	260	(1)
1992–1994	Beitar Jerusalem	72	(0)
1994–1995	Hapoel Haifa		
1995–1996	Hapoel Ramat Gan		
1996–1997	Hapoel Jerusalem		
1997–1998	Hapoel Kfar Saba		
1998–1999	Hapoel Lod		
2001	Bnei Yehuda	3	(0)

International career
	Israel	4	(0)

Managerial career
- 2025: Hapoel Kfar Shalem
- * Club domestic league appearances and goals

Yaakov Asayag (Hebrew: יעקב אסייג; born 1 March 1959) is a former Israeli footballer who played as a goalkeeper, and after retiring from professional football, spent most of his time as the goalkeeper coach of Liga Leumit side Hapoel Kfar Shalem. Assayag is primarily associated with Bnei Yehuda, where he played for a total of about 12 seasons, and with which he won the only championship in its history, in the 1989–90 season.

== Career ==
Assayag began his career in the youth department of Hapoel Nazareth Illit, and at the age of 17 he was included in the youth team roster. Upon its return to the top league in the 1978/1979 season, Bnei Yehuda Tel Aviv signed Assayag as a replacement for Roni Wassersprung who left the team. Assayag played for Bnei Yehuda for two seasons, at the end of which he moved to Hapoel Haifa. In 1980, he recorded an unprecedented achievement when he managed to keep a clean sheet for 746 minutes in a row. He later played for Maccabi Yavne and Hapoel Ramat Gan.

In the 1984-1985 National League Season, he returned to Bnei Yehuda when it played in the minor league, and after a single season, the team returned to the first league. In the 1989/1990, Assayag won the only championship in its history with the team. Assayag continued as the team's goalkeeper until the 1991-1992 National League Season. After eight consecutive seasons with the team, Assayag moved to Beitar Jerusalem and won the championship title with them.

At the end of the season, he left Beitar Jerusalem and began to wander between several teams until he retired from active play at the end of the 1998-1999 National League Season season with Hapoel Lod.

Assayag has four appearances for the Israeli national team in friendly matches.

Assayag is the Israeli goalkeeper who has kept a clean sheet in the most games in history – 171 out of 445 first league games in which he has participated.
