= Shoval Gozlan =

Israeli footballer

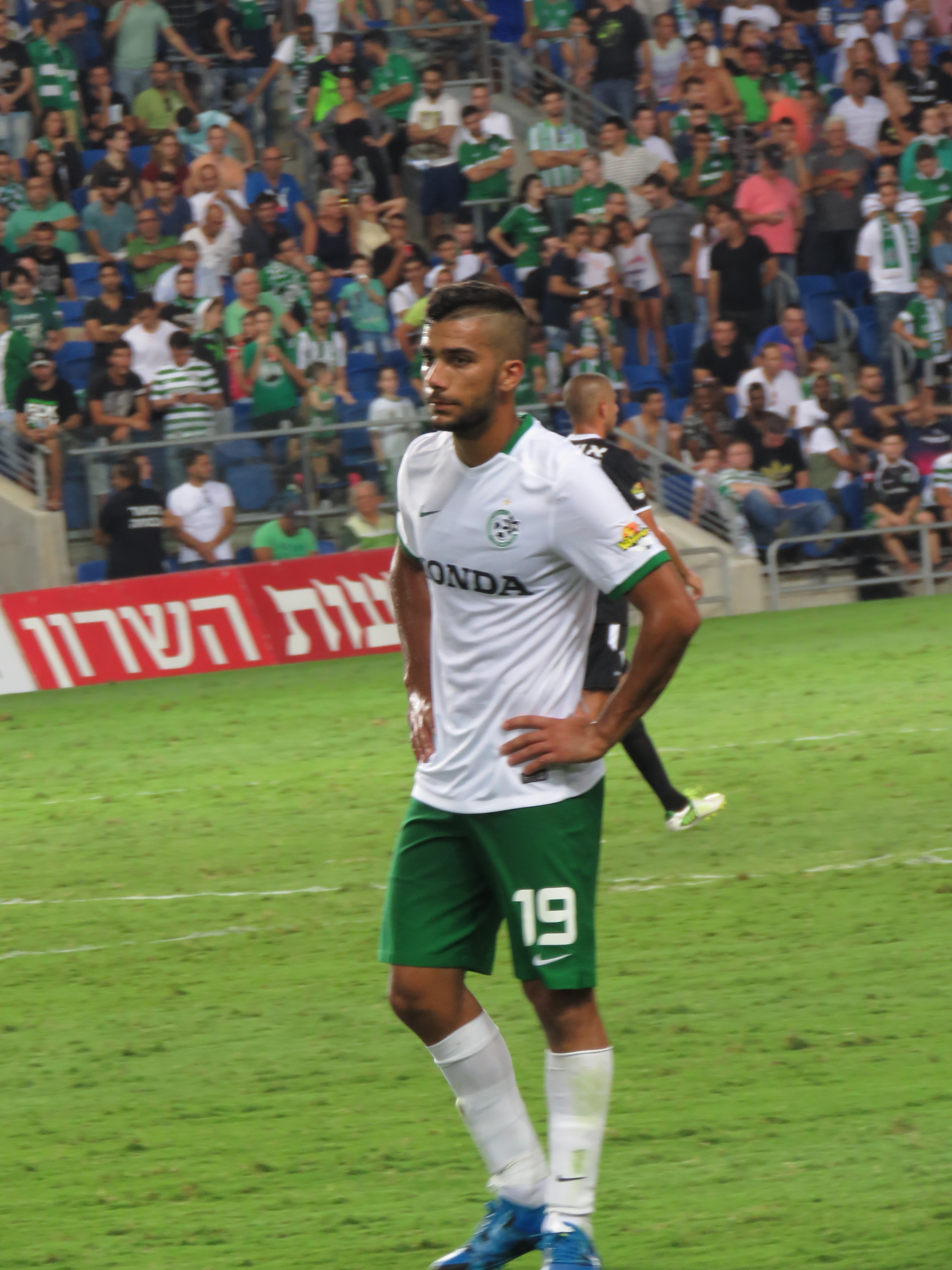
- Gozlan playing for Maccabi Haifa in 2015

Personal information
- Full name: Shoval Gozlan
- Date of birth: 25 April 1994 (age 32)
- Place of birth: Tiberias, Israel
- Height: 1.78 m (5 ft 10 in)
- Position: Striker

Youth career
- 2008–2014: Maccabi Haifa

Senior career*
Years	Team	Apps	(Gls)
2012–2017	Maccabi Haifa	59	(7)
2014–2015	→ Hapoel Tel Aviv (loan)	16	(3)
2015	→ Hapoel Ra'anana (loan)	15	(7)
2017	→ Ironi Kiryat Shmona (loan)	13	(6)
2017–2018	Ironi Kiryat Shmona	28	(7)
2018–2020	Maccabi Netanya	15	(1)
2019	→ Enosis Neon Paralimni (loan)	11	(3)
2019–2020	→ Ashdod (loan)	18	(1)
2020–2022	Hapoel Hadera	58	(14)
2022–2024	Hapoel Haifa	20	(2)
2024	Hapoel Petah Tikva	11	(1)
2024–20245	Bnei Yehuda	19	(2)
2025	Hakoah Amidar Ramat Gan	2	(0)

International career
2012–2014	Israel U19	9	(5)
2014–2017	Israel U21	13	(5)
- * Club domestic league appearances and goals

Shoval Gozlan (Hebrew: שובל גוזלן; born 25 April 1994) is an Israeli former footballer who plays as a striker.

== Career ==
Gozlan made his debut in the senior team in January 2012 against Hapoel Nir Ramat HaSharon. His debut goal was in December 2013 against Hapoel Acre in the 86th minute. He also scored his first goal in Europe against Shakhter Karagandy, in the UEFA Europa League group stage.

On 14 July 2014 Gozlan was loaned to Hapoel Tel Aviv. In the January transfer window, After Dudu Biton and Amido Baldé signed with Hapoel, his loan was terminated. On 19 January 2015 he was loaned to Hapoel Ra'anana.

== Honours ==
=== Club ===
Maccabi Haifa

- Israel State Cup (1): 2015–16
