= Imaye Taga =

Israeli footballer

Imaye Taga אמייה טגה
Personal information
- Date of birth: 1 February 1985 (age 41)
- Place of birth: Ethiopia
- Position: Midfielder

Youth career
- 2000–2004: Maccabi Netanya

Senior career*
Years	Team	Apps	(Gls)
2004–2010	Maccabi Netanya	112	(9)
2010–2012	Hapoel Ashkelon	45	(1)
2012–2015	Hapoel Acre	64	(2)
2015–2017	Maccabi Netanya	32	(2)

International career
2001	Israel U17	7	(0)
2006–2007	Israel U21	10	(1)
- * Club domestic league appearances and goals as of 1 July 2015

Imaye Taga (sometimes Amaya or Amiya, Hebrew: אמייה "אמיר" טגה; born 1 February 1985) is a former footballer. Born in Ethiopia, he played for the Israel under-21 national team. He currently serves as a member of the city council of Netanya, Israel.

== Biography ==
Imaye (Amir) Taga was born in Ethiopia to an Ethiopian-Jewish family. The family immigrated to Israel in 1991 during Operation Solomon when he was 6 years old. On 11 August 2006 Amiya's younger brother Avi Taga was found dead by his eldest brother and the Israeli Police in Kiryat Ekron. Taga had been missing from home since Wednesday, 9 August 2006. Club officials went to visit the player at his family residence to console him during the traditional Jewish mourning period of the Shiva.

In 2007 he changed his name back to his childhood name. "Imaye" in the Amharic language means "a child".

== Sports career ==
Taga attended the ORT boarding school in Netanya where he was discovered by scouts of the local side – Maccabi Netanya. Taga grew up through the ranks at Netanya, he played throughout the youth system and made his debut for the senior side at the 2003–04 season. He played for six years in the first team.

On 28 July 2010, he left Netanya and signed a two years contract with Hapoel Ashkelon. After two years spent in Ashkelon, Taga signed with Hapoel Acre on 11 April 2012.

On 5 July 2015, after five years of playing outside of Netanya, Taga returned to play for his home club of Maccabi Netanya. After 2 seasons with Netanya, Taga retired from football as he ventured into local politics. Taga is regarded as local legend in Netanya as he played 186 games in all club competitions in a total of 8 years playing for Maccabi Netanya.

On 28 February 2006, Taga made his debut for the Israel U-21s in a friendly game against Ukraine. On 11 October 2006, Taga scored the historic goal for Israel in the playoff game against France, which secured Israel's shock qualification to UEFA U-21 Championship 2007 with a 2–1 aggregate win.

On 3 August 2010, Taga got called up for the senior national team for the first time in his career. He was about to win his first cap for the national team, but an injury prevented that from happening and Taga never played a single game for the national team.

== Honours ==
- Toto Cup (Leumit):
  - Winner (1): 2004–05
- Liga Leumit:
  - Winner (1): 2016–17
  - Runner-up (1): 2004–05
- Israeli Premier League:
  - Runner-up (2): 2006–07, 2007–08

== Club career statistics ==
(correct as of 11.8.15)

Club	Season	League			Cup			Toto Cup			Europe			Total		
Club	Season	Apps	Goals	Assists	Apps	Goals	Assists	Apps	Goals	Assists	Apps	Goals	Assists	Apps	Goals	Assists
Maccabi Netanya	2003–04	9	0	1	2	0	0	2	0	0	0	0	0	13	0	1
Maccabi Netanya	2004–05	28	3	2	1	0	0	5	0	0	0	0	0	34	3	2
Maccabi Netanya	2005–06	27	2	0	0	0	0	5	0	0	0	0	0	32	2	0
Maccabi Netanya	2006–07	28	3	2	1	0	0	5	0	0	0	0	0	34	3	2
Maccabi Netanya	2007–08	15	1	0	0	0	0	2	0	0	2	0	0	19	1	0
Maccabi Netanya	2008–09	0	0	0	0	0	0	0	0	0	0	0	0	0	0	0
Maccabi Netanya	2009–10	5	0	0	0	0	0	6	0	0	2	0	0	13	0	0
Hapoel Ashkelon	2010–11	29	0	0	2	0	0	6	0	0	0	0	0	37	0	0
Hapoel Ashkelon	2011–12	16	1	2	0	0	0	3	0	0	0	0	0	19	1	2
Hapoel Acre	2012–13	26	1	0	1	0	0	2	0	0	0	0	0	29	1	0
Hapoel Acre	2013–14	12	0	0	0	0	0	0	0	0	0	0	0	12	0	0
Hapoel Acre	2014–15	25	1	0	1	0	0	3	0	0	0	0	0	29	1	0
Maccabi Netanya	2015–16	17	1	0	1	0	0	4	0	0	0	0	0	22	1	0
Maccabi Netanya	2016–17	15	1	0	0	0	0	4	0	0	0	0	0	19	1	0
Career		258	14	7	9	0	0	47	0	0	4	0	0	318	14	7
