= Ran Abukarat =

Israeli international football player

Ran Abukarat רן אבוקרט
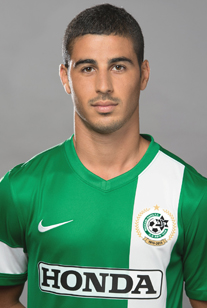
- Abukarat with Maccabi Haifa in 2013

Personal information
- Full name: Ran Abukarat
- Date of birth: 14 December 1988 (age 37)
- Place of birth: Haifa, Israel
- Height: 1.74 m (5 ft 8 1/2 in)
- Position: Midfielder

Youth career
- 1997–2006: Hapoel Haifa

Senior career*
Years	Team	Apps	(Gls)
2006–2013	Hapoel Haifa	178	(13)
2013–2016	Maccabi Haifa	13	(0)
Total		191	(13)

International career
2005	Israel U17	4	(0)
2006	Israel U18	4	(0)
2006–2007	Israel U19	14	(0)
2008–2009	Israel U21	8	(0)
- * Club domestic league appearances and goals as of 13 February 2013

Ran Abukarat (Hebrew: רן אבוקרט; born 14 December 1988) is an Israeli retired international football player. He is the son of Maccabi Haifa veteran Avraham Abukarat.

== Honours ==
=== Club ===
Maccabi Haifa

- Israel State Cup (1): 2015–16
