= Ladji Diakité =

Mali filmmaker

Ladji Diakité لادجي دياكيتي
- Born: Ladji Diakité; Bamako, Mali
- Education: Ecole Normale Supérieure
- Occupations: Director, assistant director, costume designer
- Years active: 1991–present

Ladji Diakité (Arabic: لادجي دياكيتي), is a Malian filmmaker. He is best known as the director of critically acclaimed feature films such as Duel à Dafa and Fantan Fanga. Apart from direction, Diakité is also an assistant director and costume designer.

== Personal life ==
He was born in Bamako, Mali. Diakité obtained his master’s degree in literature from the Ecole Normale Supérieure. He also studied at the Centre national du cinéma et de l'image animée (National Centre for Film Production).

== Career ==
In 1991, he joined the film Ta Dona as the costume designer. Then in 1997, he worked in the film Taafé Fanga as the assistant director.

In 2001, he directed maiden film La Rencontre des chasseurs. In 2006, he involved in the tele film Duel a Dafa. Then in 2007, he directed Duel à Dafa and then Fantan Fanga co-directed with Adama Drabo in 2009. The film received official selection of Panafrican Film and Television Festival of Ouagadougou (FESPACO) 2009. Meanwhile, he became the head of Chief Production Division of the Centre national de la cinématographie du Mali (National Center of Cinematography of Mali: CNCM).

== Filmography ==
Year	Film	Role	Genre	Ref.
1991	Ta Dona (Fire!)	costume designer	Feature film	
1997	Taafé Fanga (Skirt Power)	assistant director	Feature film	
2001	La Rencontre des chasseurs (The meeting of hunters)	director	Feature film	
2005	Commissaire Balla	director	TV series	
2007	Duel à Dafa	director	Tele film	
2009	Fantan Fanga (Power of the Poor)	director	Feature film	
2010	Concessions (Les) (The Concessions)	director	TV series	
2016	Rêve d’or (Golden dream)	director	Documentary	
