= Amir Edri =

Israeli goalkeeper

Amir Edri אמיר אדרי
Personal information
- Full name: Amir Edri
- Date of birth: July 26, 1985 (age 41)
- Place of birth: Or Akiva, Israel
- Height: 1.83 m (6 ft 0 in)
- Position: Goalkeeper

Youth career
- Maccabi Haifa

Senior career*
Years	Team	Apps	(Gls)
2005–2015	Maccabi Haifa	39	(0)
2008	→ Maccabi Herzliya (loan)	5	(0)
2011–2012	→ Maccabi Netanya (loan)	31	(0)
- * Club domestic league appearances and goals as of 1 June 2015

Amir Edri (Hebrew: אמיר אדרי; born July 26, 1985) is an Israeli goalkeeper. After a loan spell with Maccabi Herzliya in the 2007/08 season, Edri returned to Haifa and played 11 games after the first-string 'keeper was injured.

== Honours ==
- Israeli Premier League (2):
  - 2008–09, 2010–11
