= Bojan Šaranov =

Serbian footballer (born 1987)

Bojan Šaranov Бојан Шаранов
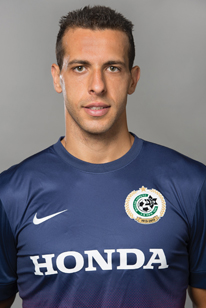
- Šaranov with Maccabi Haifa in 2013

Personal information
- Full name: Bojan Šaranov
- Date of birth: 22 October 1987 (age 39)
- Place of birth: Vršac, SFR Yugoslavia
- Height: 1.88 m (6 ft 2 in)
- Position: Goalkeeper

Youth career
- OFK Beograd

Senior career*
Years	Team	Apps	(Gls)
2004–2011	OFK Beograd	72	(0)
2005–2007	→ Mačva Šabac (loan)	18	(0)
2007	→ Bežanija (loan)	2	(0)
2008	→ Rudar Pljevlja (loan)	0	(0)
2011–2014	Maccabi Haifa	76	(0)
2015	Ergotelis	13	(0)
2015–2016	Partizan	18	(0)
2016–2017	Qarabağ	2	(0)
2017–2018	Zemun	12	(0)
2018	Radnički Niš	8	(0)
2018–2019	Lamia	19	(0)
2019–2020	Fatih Karagümrük	11	(0)
2021–2023	Lamia	37	(0)

International career^{‡}
2006	Serbia and Montenegro U19 (Note: Only official UEFA matches included)	1	(0)
2007–2009	Serbia U21	9	(0)
2011	Serbia	1	(0)
- * Club domestic league appearances and goals as of 13 February 2023 ‡ National team caps and goals as of 3 June 2011

Bojan Šaranov (Serbian Cyrillic: Бојан Шаранов; born 22 October 1987) is a Serbian retired professional footballer who played as a goalkeeper.

== Club career ==
=== OFK Beograd ===
Born in Vršac, Šaranov started out at OFK Beograd, making his senior debuts in the 2004–05 season, aged 17. He subsequently went on loan to Mačva Šabac, Bežanija, and Rudar Pljevlja in order to gain first team experience. After consecutive loan spells, Šaranov returned to OFK Beograd and became the first-choice goalkeeper following Radiša Ilić's departure in the 2009 winter transfer window.

Šaranov missed just two games in the 2009–10 Serbian SuperLiga, helping the side earn a 3rd-place finish and secure a spot in the 2010–11 UEFA Europa League. In the following 2010–11 campaign, Šaranov was named in the league's Team of the Season due to his performances in the process.

=== Maccabi Haifa ===
In June 2011, Šaranov moved abroad and signed with Israeli champions Maccabi Haifa. He made his official debut for the club on 27 July 2011, being substituted by Nir Davidovich at half-time in an eventual 2–1 home win over Slovenian side Maribor. On 20 August 2011, Šaranov made his first league appearance for Maccabi Haifa in a 4–1 away success at Maccabi Netanya. He also collected five appearances in the 2011–12 UEFA Europa League group stage.

On 24 October 2013, Šaranov saved two penalties taken by Miroslav Stoch, but failed to prevent his team's 2–3 loss away at PAOK in Group L of the Europa League. He again missed just one game in the group stage, as the team finished in third place. In his third season at Maccabi Haifa, Šaranov made a career-high 38 appearances in all competitions.

=== Ergotelis ===
On 30 December 2014, Šaranov signed with Greek side Ergotelis. He saved a penalty from Alejandro Domínguez in a 0–3 away league loss against Olympiacos on 14 February 2015. Until the end of the 2014–15 Super League Greece, Šaranov recorded 13 appearances, before leaving the club following their relegation from the top flight.

=== Partizan ===
In the 2016 winter transfer window, Šaranov returned to Serbia and joined Partizan. He helped the side win the Serbian Cup in May 2016. On 31 August 2016, Šaranov terminated his contract with Partizan by mutual consent.

=== Qarabağ ===
Shortly after leaving Partizan, Šaranov joined Azerbaijani club Qarabağ. He mostly served as the team's third-choice goalkeeper behind Ibrahim Šehić and Şahruddin Məhəmmədəliyev in the 2016–17 season, as Qarabağ won the double.

=== Later career ===
In September 2017, Šaranov joined Serbian SuperLiga newcomers Zemun on a free transfer. He immediately established himself as a first team regular, collecting 12 league appearances in the first half of the 2017–18 season under manager Milan Milanović. In January of the following year, Šaranov switched to fellow SuperLiga club Radnički Niš. On 13 July 2018, he signed a year contract with Super League club Lamia for an undisclosed fee. On 28 February 2019, Šaranov saved the resulting spot-kick from Kostas Fortounis which was destined for his left corner, five minutes before the final whistle, sealing a shocking 1–0 away Greek Football Cup win against giants Olympiacos and advanced to the semi-finals of the Greek Cup 4–3 on aggregate.

== International career ==
In March 2008, Šaranov was included in the preliminary squad for the 2008 Summer Olympics, but failed to make the final cut for the tournament. He was subsequently selected to represent Serbia at the 2009 UEFA Under-21 Championship. Serving as a backup for Željko Brkić, Šaranov was unable to make any appearance in the tournament.

In March 2011, Šaranov received his first call-up to the Serbia national team by manager Vladimir Petrović ahead of a UEFA Euro 2012 qualifier versus Northern Ireland. He eventually made his full international debut for Serbia on 3 June 2011, playing the full 90 minutes in a 1–2 friendly loss away against South Korea.

== Career statistics ==
As of 6 May 2019

=== Club ===
Appearances and goals by club, season and competition
Club	Season	National League			National Cup		League Cup		Continental		Total	
Club	Season	Division	Apps	Goals	Apps	Goals	Apps	Goals	Apps	Goals	Apps	Goals
OFK Beograd	2004–05	First League of Serbia and Montenegro	1	0	0	0	—		0	0	1	0
OFK Beograd	2005–06	First League of Serbia and Montenegro	2	0	1	0	—		0	0	3	0
OFK Beograd	2006–07	Serbian SuperLiga	0	0	0	0	—		0	0	0	0
OFK Beograd	2007–08	Serbian SuperLiga	0	0	0	0	—		—		0	0
OFK Beograd	2008–09	Serbian SuperLiga	14	0	3	0	—		0	0	17	0
OFK Beograd	2009–10	Serbian SuperLiga	28	0	3	0	—		—		31	0
OFK Beograd	2010–11	Serbian SuperLiga	27	0	0	0	—		4	0	31	0
OFK Beograd	Total		72	0	7	0	—		4	0	83	0
Mačva Šabac (loan)	2005–06	Serbian First League	1	0	0	0	—		—		1	0
Mačva Šabac (loan)	2006–07	Serbian First League	17	0	0	0	—		—		17	0
Mačva Šabac (loan)	Total		18	0	0	0	—		—		18	0
Bežanija (loan)	2007–08	Serbian SuperLiga	2	0	1	0	—		0	0	3	0
Rudar Pljevlja (loan)	2007–08	Montenegrin First League	0	0	0	0	—		0	0	0	0
Maccabi Haifa	2011–12	Israeli Premier League	21	0	1	0	2	0	6	0	30	0
Maccabi Haifa	2012–13	Israeli Premier League	28	0	4	0	0	0	—		32	0
Maccabi Haifa	2013–14	Israeli Premier League	27	0	0	0	0	0	11	0	38	0
Maccabi Haifa	Total		76	0	5	0	2	0	17	0	100	0
Ergotelis	2014–15	Super League Greece	13	0	1	0	—		—		14	0
Partizan	2015–16	Serbian SuperLiga	12	0	3	0	—		0	0	15	0
Partizan	2016–17	Serbian SuperLiga	6	0	0	0	—		2	0	8	0
Partizan	Total		18	0	3	0	—		2	0	23	0
Qarabağ	2016–17	Azerbaijan Premier League	2	0	0	0	—		0	0	2	0
Zemun	2017–18	Serbian SuperLiga	12	0	0	0	—		—		12	0
Radnički Niš	2017–18	Serbian SuperLiga	8	0	0	0	—		—		8	0
Lamia	2018–19	Super League Greece	19	0	2	0	—		—		21	0
Fatih Karagümrük	2019–20	TFF 1. Lig	11	0	1	0	—		—		12	0
Career total			251	0	20	0	2	0	23	0	296	0

=== International ===
Appearances and goals by national team and year
National team	Year	Apps	Goals
Serbia	2011	1	0
Total		1	0

== Honours ==
=== Club ===
OFK Beograd

- Serbia and Montenegro Cup: Runner-up 2005–06

Partizan

- Serbian Cup: 2015–16

Qarabağ

- Azerbaijan Premier League: 2016–17
- Azerbaijan Cup: 2016–17

=== Individual ===
- Serbian SuperLiga Team of the Season: 2010–11
