= Achenkirch =

- Municipality
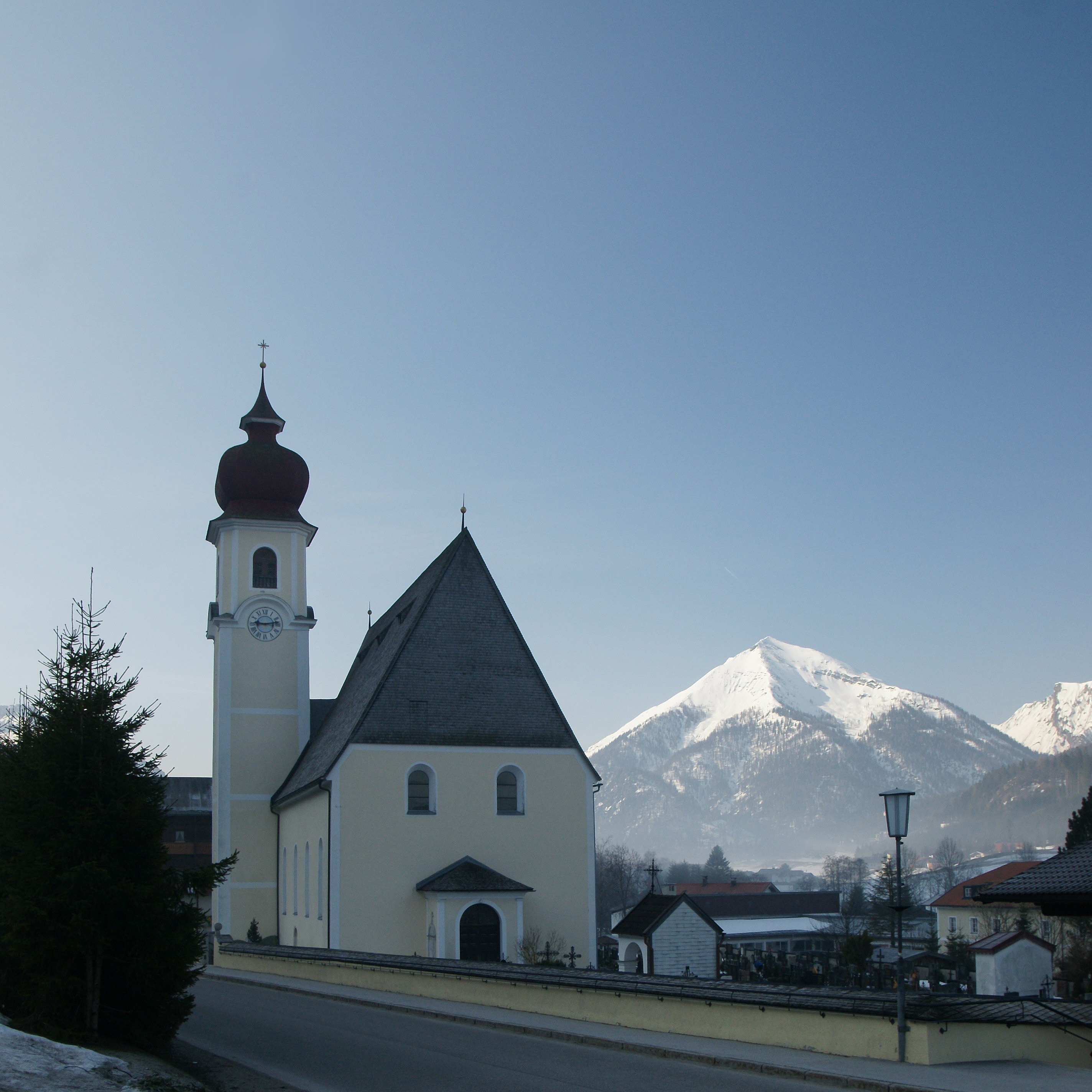

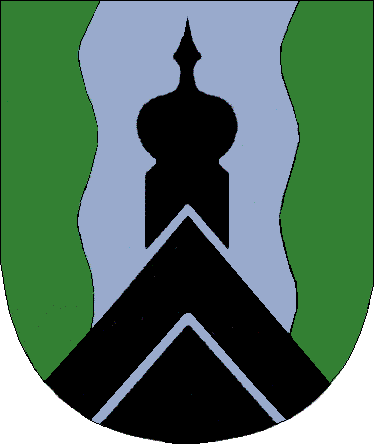
- Coat of arms

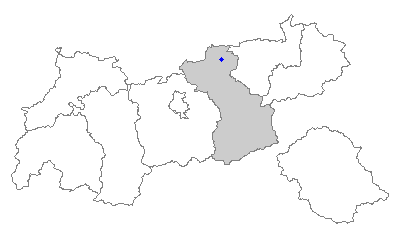
- Location within Tyrol

- Location within Austria
- Coordinates: 47°31′00″N 11°41′00″E
- Country: Austria
- State: Tyrol
- District: Schwaz

Government
  - Mayor: Karl Moser (ÖVP)

Area
  - Total: 113.95 km^{2} (44.00 sq mi)
- Elevation: 916 m (3,005 ft)

Population (2021)
  - Total: 2,169
  - Density: 19.03/km^{2} (49.30/sq mi)
- Time zone: UTC+1 (CET)
  - Summer (DST): UTC+2 (CEST)
- Postal code: 6215
- Area code: 05246
- Vehicle registration: SZ
- Website: www.achenkirch. tirol.gv.at

Achenkirch is a municipality in the Schwaz district in the Austrian state of Tyrol. It is located at the northern end of Lake Achensee.
