= Adi Konstantinos =

Israeli footballer

Adi Konstantinos עדי קונסטנטינוס
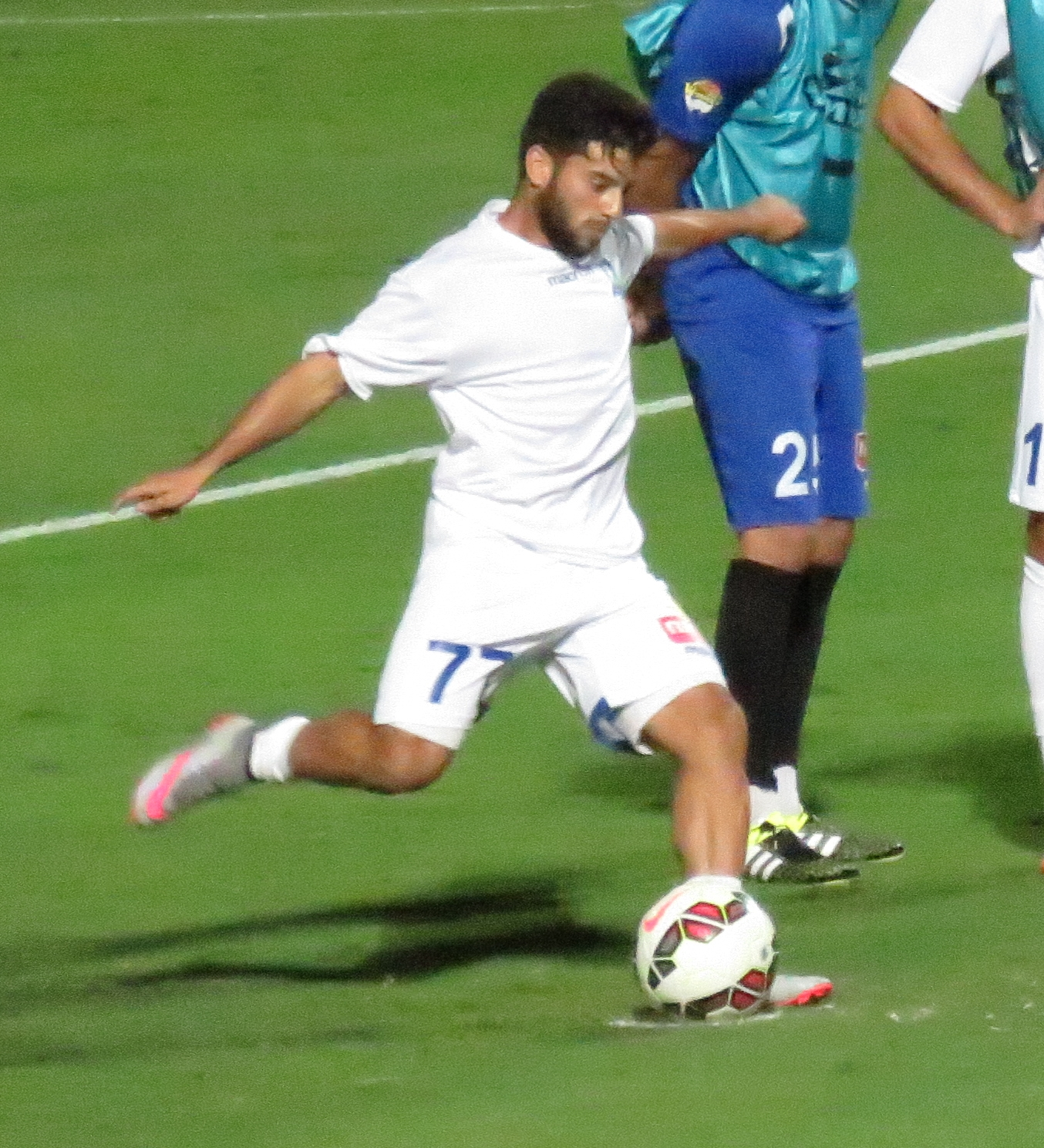
- Konstantinos playing for Olympiakos Nicosia in 2020

Personal information
- Full name: Adi Konstantinos
- Date of birth: 9 November 1994 (age 32)
- Place of birth: Ma'ale Adumim, West Bank
- Position: Defensive midfielder

Team information
- Current team: Beitar Tubruk
- Number: 3

Youth career
- 2007–2009: Beitar Jerusalem
- 2009–2014: Maccabi Haifa

Senior career*
Years	Team	Apps	(Gls)
2013–2018	Maccabi Haifa	3	(0)
2014–2016	→ Hapoel Acre (loan)	41	(0)
2016	→ Hapoel Petah Tikva (loan)	16	(1)
2016–2017	→ Hapoel Jerusalem (loan)	35	(1)
2017–2018	→ Maccabi Netanya	3	(0)
2018	→ Hapoel Katamon (loan)	17	(1)
2018–2019	Hapoel Acre	21	(0)
2019–2020	Hapoel Ashkelon	23	(2)
2020–2021	Olympiakos Nicosia	0	(0)
2020	Digenis Morphou (loan)	0	(0)
2021–2022	Hapoel Baqa al-Gharbiyye	0	(0)
2022	Maccabi Herzliya	11	(0)
2022	Ahva Reineh	1	(0)
2023	Hapoel Bnei Lod	0	(0)
2023–2025	Sporting Tel Aviv	15	(0)
2024–2025	→ Bnei Ra'anana	9	(4)
2025	→ Maccabi Kfar Yona (loan)	7	(0)
2026–	Beitar Tubruk	4	(0)

International career
2015–2017	Israel U21	3	(0)
- * Club domestic league appearances and goals as of 1 June 2026

Adi Konstantinos (Hebrew: עדי קונסטנטינוס; born 9 November 1994) is an Israeli professional footballer who plays for Beitar Nes Tubruk.
