= Gal Cohen =

Israeli footballer

Gal Cohen גל כהן
Personal information
- Full name: Gal Cohen
- Date of birth: 14 August 1982 (age 44)
- Place of birth: Dor, Israel
- Height: 1.86 m (6 ft 1 in)
- Position: Centre-back

Team information
- Current team: Hapoel Ra'anana (manager)

Youth career
- Maccabi Haifa
- F.C. Neve Yosef

Senior career*
Years	Team	Apps	(Gls)
2001–2011	Hapoel Petah Tikva	159	(0)
2006–2007	→ Hapoel Nazareth Illit (loan)	22	(0)
2011–2014	Bnei Yehuda Tel Aviv	99	(1)
2014–2015	Hapoel Haifa	0	(0)

Managerial career
- 2017–2019: Hapel Ra'anana (youth)
- 2019–2020: Hapel Ra'anana (assistant manager)
- 2020: Hapel Ra'anana
- 2022–2023: Beitar Jerusalem (assistant manager)
- 2024: Beitar Jerusalem
- 2024–: Israel (assistant manager)
- * Club domestic league appearances and goals

Gal Cohen (Hebrew: גל כהן; born 14 August 1982) is an Israeli former footballer, and the current co-assistant manager of Israel national football team.

== Life and career ==
Cohen was born and raised in moshav, Dor, Israel, to an Israeli-Jewish family. He started his career in 2001, when he signed to Hapoel Petah Tikva. In 2006/2007, Cohen was loaned to Hapoel Nazareth Illit, after one year he moved back to Petah Tikva and became the Captain.

In August 2011, he was transferred to Bnei Yehuda Tel Aviv.
