= Edin Cocalić =

Bosnian footballer (born 1987)

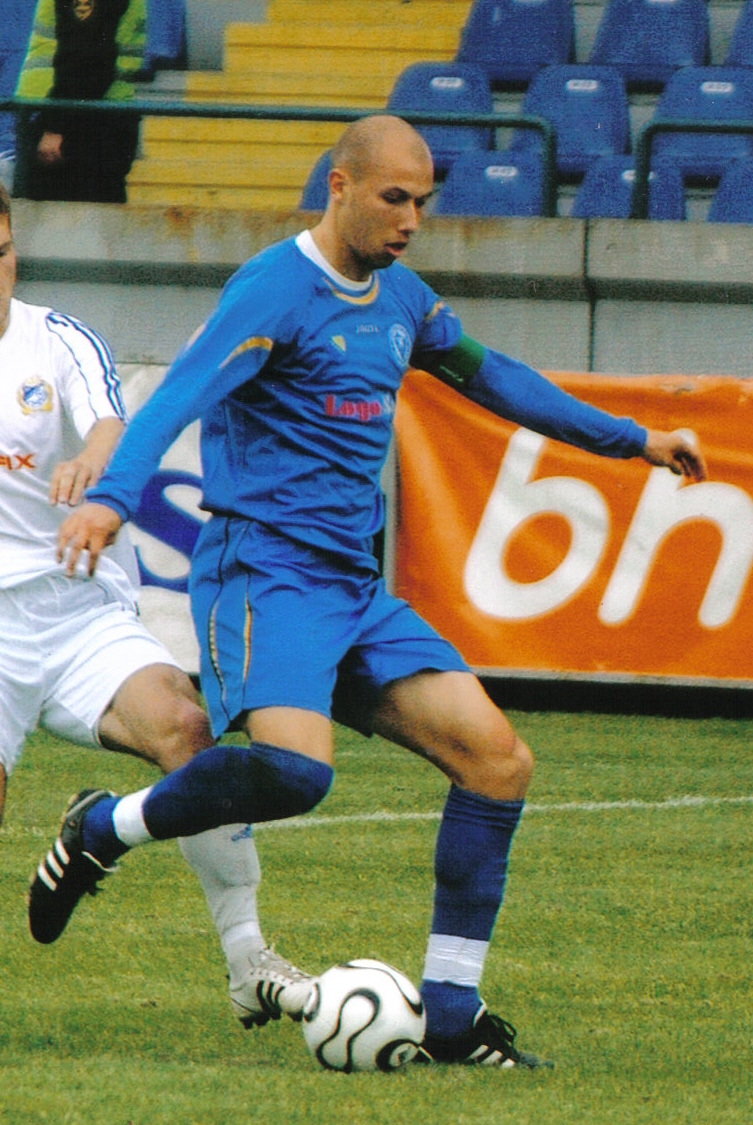
- Cocalić playing for Željezničar in 2008

Personal information
- Date of birth: 5 December 1987 (age 38)
- Place of birth: Višegrad, SFR Yugoslavia
- Height: 1.90 m (6 ft 3 in)
- Position: Centre-back

Team information
- Current team: Željezničar (youth school director)

Youth career
- 1999–2006: Željezničar

Senior career*
Years	Team	Apps	(Gls)
2006–2009	Željezničar	88	(5)
2010–2012	Panionios	48	(1)
2012–2015	Maccabi Haifa	77	(2)
2015–2019	Mechelen	106	(2)
2019–2020	Akhisarspor	42	(2)
2020	Altay	3	(0)
2021	Panetolikos	12	(0)
2022–2024	Željezničar	62	(2)
Total		438	(14)

International career
2003	Bosnia and Herzegovina U17	3	(1)
2005	Bosnia and Herzegovina U19	2	(0)
2007–2008	Bosnia and Herzegovina U21	5	(0)
2015–2017	Bosnia and Herzegovina	10	(0)
- * Club domestic league appearances and goals

Edin Cocalić (Bosnian pronunciation: [ědin tsǒtsalitɕ]; born 5 December 1987) is a Bosnian former professional footballer who played as a centre-back. He is the current director of the youth school of Bosnian Premier League club Željezničar

Cocalić began his professional career at Željezničar, before joining Panionios in 2010. Two years later, he moved to Maccabi Haifa. In 2015, he was transferred to Mechelen. Four years later, Cocalić signed with Akhisarspor. Following Akhisarspor, he played for Altay and Panetolikos. In 2022, he returned to Željezničar, retiring in 2024.

A former youth international for Bosnia and Herzegovina, Cocalić made his senior international debut in 2015, earning 10 caps until 2017.

== Club career ==
=== Early career ===
Cocalić came through Željezničar's youth academy, which he joined in 1999. He made his professional debut in 2006 at the age of 18.

In January 2010, Cocalić signed with Greek club Panionios. In January 2012, he moved to Israeli outfit Maccabi Haifa.

=== Mechelen ===
On 31 January 2015, Cocalić signed a three-and-a-half-year deal with Belgian side Mechelen. A week later, he made his official debut for the club against Charleroi. Two months later, he scored his first goal for Mechelen against Waasland-Beveren.

In January 2017, Cocalić agreed to a new contract expiring in June 2020.

On 23 January 2018, he played his 100th game for the team against St. Truiden.

In spite of Mechelen's relegation to the Belgian First Division B in March 2018, Cocalić decided to stay at the club, and even extended his contract for additional season.

=== Akhisarspor ===
On 21 January 2019, Cocalić was transferred to Turkish team Akhisarspor for an undisclosed fee. A week later, on his competitive debut for the club, he scored a goal and saw a straight red card.

Even though Akhisarspor got relegated to the 1. Lig at the end of season, Cocalić chose to stay with the team.

=== Later career ===
After leaving Akhisarspor, Cocalić signed with 1. Lig club Altay in September 2020.

On 17 January 2021, he joined Greek club Panetolikos. In November 2021, Cocalić terminated his contract with Panetolikos and left the club.

=== Return to Željezničar ===
On 24 January 2022, Cocalić returned to his former club Željezničar, over a decade after he had left the club. On 25 February 2022, he made his second debut for Željezničar, in a 2–0 league loss against Velež Mostar. On 16 July 2022, he scored his first goal in the 2022–23 season against Leotar, his first Bosnian Premier League goal since October 2009.

On 14 April 2024, Cocalić was sent off after a straight red card in the city derby against Sarajevo. He left Željezničar after the end of the 2023–24 season and announced his retirement from professional football.

== International career ==
Cocalić represented Bosnia and Herzegovina on all youth levels. He also served as captain of the under-17 team.

In March 2015, he received his first senior call-up, for games against Andorra and Austria. Cocalić debuted in a convincing triumph over the former on 28 March.

== Executive career ==
On 15 November 2026, Željezničar announced Cocalić as the club's new director of its youth school.

== Personal life ==
Cocalić married his long-time girlfriend Merima in March 2010. Together they have two children, a girl and a boy.

== Career statistics ==
=== Club ===
Appearances and goals by club, season and competition
Club	Season	League			Cup		Continental		Other		Total	
Club	Season	Division	Apps	Goals	Apps	Goals	Apps	Goals	Apps	Goals	Apps	Goals
Željezničar	2005–06	Bosnian Premier League	6	0	1	0	–		–		7	0
Željezničar	2006–07	Bosnian Premier League	26	1	4	0	–		–		30	1
Željezničar	2007–08	Bosnian Premier League	23	1	5	1	–		–		28	2
Željezničar	2008–09	Bosnian Premier League	25	1	1	0	–		–		26	1
Željezničar	2009–10	Bosnian Premier League	8	2	2	0	–		–		10	2
Željezničar	Total		88	5	13	1	–		–		101	6
Panionios	2009–10	Super League Greece	7	1	1	0	–		–		8	1
Panionios	2010–11	Super League Greece	26	0	0	0	–		–		26	0
Panionios	2011–12	Super League Greece	15	0	2	1	–		–		17	1
Panionios	Total		48	1	3	1	–		–		51	2
Maccabi Haifa	2011–12	Israeli Premier League	16	0	4	0	–		–		20	0
Maccabi Haifa	2012–13	Israeli Premier League	25	0	3	0	–		–		28	0
Maccabi Haifa	2013–14	Israeli Premier League	22	1	0	0	11	0	–		33	1
Maccabi Haifa	2014–15	Israeli Premier League	14	1	1	0	–		–		15	1
Maccabi Haifa	Total		77	2	8	0	11	0	–		96	2
Mechelen	2014–15	Belgian First Division A	15	1	–		–		–		15	1
Mechelen	2015–16	Belgian First Division A	24	1	3	1	–		–		27	2
Mechelen	2016–17	Belgian First Division A	36	0	2	0	–		–		38	0
Mechelen	2017–18	Belgian First Division A	26	0	2	0	–		–		28	0
Mechelen	2018–19	Belgian First Division B	5	0	2	1	–		–		7	1
Mechelen	Total		106	2	9	2	–		–		115	4
Akhisarspor	2018–19	Süper Lig	9	1	2	0	–		–		11	1
Akhisarspor	2019–20	1. Lig	33	1	0	0	–		3 (Note: Two appearances in 1. Lig promotion playoffs, one appearance in 2019 Turkish Super Cup)	0	36	1
Akhisarspor	2020–21	1. Lig	0	0	0	0	–		–		0	0
Akhisarspor	Total		42	2	2	0	–		3	0	47	2
Altay	2020–21	1. Lig	3	0	1	0	–		–		4	0
Panetolikos	2020–21	Super League Greece	12	0	1	0	–		1 (Note: One appearance in Super League Greece relegation play-offs)	0	14	0
Željezničar	2021–22	Bosnian Premier League	11	0	–		–		–		11	0
Željezničar	2022–23	Bosnian Premier League	25	1	6	1	–		–		31	2
Željezničar	2023–24	Bosnian Premier League	26	1	1	0	3	0	–		30	1
Željezničar	Total		62	2	7	1	3	0	–		72	3
Career total			438	14	44	5	14	0	4	0	500	19

=== International ===
Appearances and goals by national team and year
National team	Year	Apps	Goals
Bosnia and Herzegovina	2015	4	0
Bosnia and Herzegovina	2016	3	0
Bosnia and Herzegovina	2017	3	0
Total		10	0
