= Mekeme Tamla Ladji =

Ivorian footballer

Zito
Personal information
- Full name: Mekeme Tamla Ladji
- Date of birth: 19 September 1985 (age 41)
- Place of birth: Abidjan, Ivory Coast
- Height: 1.75 m (5 ft 9 in)
- Position: Midfielder

Youth career
- –2001: Académie Jean-Marc Guillou
- 2001–2004: ASEC Mimosas

Senior career*
Years	Team	Apps	(Gls)
2004–2007	KSK Beveren	79	(0)
2007–2013	Le Mans	55	(0)
2008–2009	→ Laval (loan)	17	(0)
2013–2014	Maccabi Petah Tikva	18	(1)
2014–2015	Levadiakos	24	(0)
2015–2018	Motema Pembe	0	(0)
- * Club domestic league appearances and goals as of 12 July 2023

Mekeme Tamla Ladji, simply known as Zito, (born 19 September 1985) is an Ivorian former footballer.

Tamla played for K.S.K. Beveren in the Belgian First Division, Le Mans in Ligue 2, Levadiakos in the Greek Super League and Motema Pembe in Linafoot.
