= 2014–15 Maccabi Haifa F.C. season =

Maccabi Haifa
2014–15 season
- Chairman: Ya'akov Shahar
- Manager: Aleksandar Stanojević(until 27 December); Marco Balbul (from 28 December)
- Stadium: Sammy Ofer
- Ligat Ha'Al: 5th
- State Cup: Round of 16
- Toto Cup: Runners-up
- Top goalscorer: League: Hen Ezra (8); All: Rubén Rayos (12)
- Highest home attendance: League: 29,300 vs Beitar Jerusalem (5 March 2015); Toto Cup: 8,500 Hapoel Haifa (19 August 2014)
- Lowest home attendance: 6,000 vs F.C. Ashdod (14 February 2015); Toto Cup: 2,000 vs Bnei Sakhnin (10 September 2014)
- Average home league attendance: League: 22,717; Toto Cup: 5,667
Home colours	Away colours	Third colours

The 2014-15 season is Maccabi Haifa's 57th season in Israeli Premier League, and their 33rd consecutive season in the top division of Israeli football.

== Club ==
=== Squad information ===
N	Pos.	Nat.	Name	Age	EU	Since	App	Goals	Ends	Transfer fee	Notes
3	CB	(Spain)	Abraham Paz	35	EU	2014	13	0	2015	Free	
4	DM	(Sierra Leone)	Medo	26	EU	2014	16	1	2015	Free	Second nationality: Finland
5	RB	(Israel)	Elad Gabai	28	Non-EU	2013	37	0	2017	€400,000	
6	CM	(Israel)	Ran Abukarat	25	Non-EU	2013	19	0	2016	€350,000	
7	DM	(Israel)	Gustavo Boccoli (vice-captain)	36	Non-EU	2004	434	38	2016	€250,000	Second nationality: Brazil
8	LW	(Israel)	Hen Ezra	25	Non-EU	2012	121	29	2016	€850,000	
9	FW	(Israel)	Itay Shechter	27	Non-EU	2014	14	2	2018	€350,000	
10	AM	(Spain)	Rubén Rayos	28	EU	2013	74	29	2016	€800,000	
11	RW	(Israel)	Idan Vered	25	EU	2010	173	21	2015	€900,000	Second nationality: Romania
12	CB	(Israel)	Orel Dgani	25	Non-EU	2011	70	0	2016	€800,000	
13	LB	(Israel)	Taleb Tawatha	22	Non-EU	2009	182	7	2020	Youth system	
14	CF	(Israel)	Weaam Amasha	29	Non-EU	2011	120	43	2015	€320,000	
15	AM	(Israel)	Yossi Benayoun (captain)	34	EU	2014	199	76	2017	Free	Second nationality: Spain
16	LW	(Israel)	Eliran Atar	27	Non-EU	2014	15	6	2018	Free	
17	CF	(Israel)	Alon Turgeman	23	Non-EU	2011	144	40	2017	€450,000	
18	LB	(Israel)	Samuel Scheimann	26	EU	2012	61	0	2016	Free	Second nationality: Netherlands
21	CB	(Israel)	Dekel Keinan (vice-captain)	30	Non-EU	2012	299	15	2015	€450,000	Originally from youth system
22	GK	(Israel)	Amir Edri	29	Non-EU	2005	69	0	2015	Youth system	
24	DM	(Spain)	Míchel	28	EU	2014	25	1	2015	Free	
26	DM	(Israel)	Avihai Yadin	27	Non-EU	2012	57	0	2017	€270,000	
27	DF	(Israel)	Eyal Meshumar	31	Non-EU	2006	298	17	2015	€250,000	
28	CF	(Israel)	Shon Weissman	18	Non-EU	2013	13	0	2016	Youth system	
32	DM	(Israel)	Kobi Moyal	27	Non-EU	2014	73	0	2017	Free	
38	GK	(Serbia)	Vladimir Stojković	31	EU	2014	40	0	2017	Free	
44	GK	(Israel)	Ohad Levita	28	EU	2014	4	0	2015	Free	Second nationality: Germany

- Last updated: 2 May 2015
- Source: maccabi-haifafc.walla.co.il, Players transfer, Wikipedia players' articles (for player numbers, appearances, and goals)
- Ordered by squad number.

== Transfers ==
=== Transfers in ===
No.	Pos.	Nat.	Name	Age	EU	Moving from	Type	Transfer window	Ends	Transfer fee	Source
—	FW	(Israel)	Shahar Hirsh	21	Non-EU	(Israel) Hapoel Afula	Transfer	Summer	2019	$1M	Maccabi Haifa
9	FW	(Cameroon)	Mohammadou Idrissou	34	Non-EU	(Germany) Kaiserslautern	Transfer	Summer	2015	Free	Maccabi Haifa
26	FW	(Israel)	Mohammed Kalibat	24	Non-EU	(Israel) Bnei Sakhnin	Loan return	Summer	2017	Free	Maccabi Haifa
14	FW	(Israel)	Weaam Amasha	28	Non-EU	(Israel) Ironi Kiryat Shmona	Loan return	Summer	2017	Free	Maccabi Haifa
16	FW	(Israel)	Ismaeel Ryan	20	Non-EU	(Israel) Hapoel Acre	Loan return	Summer	2017	Free	
15	MF	(Israel)	Yossi Benayoun	34	EU	(England) Queens Park Rangers	Transfer	Summer	2016	Free	YNET
38	GK	(Serbia)	Vladimir Stojković	30	EU	(Greece) Ergotelis	Transfer	Summer	2016	N/A	SPORT5
4	DF	(Israel)	Matan Ohayon	28	Non-EU	(Israel) Ironi Kiryat Shmona	Transfer	Summer	2016	N/A	SPORT5
32	MF	(Israel)	Kobi Moyal	27	Non-EU	(Moldova) Sheriff Tiraspol	Transfer	Summer	2016	Free	YNET
12	DF	(Israel)	Orel Dgani	25	Non-EU	(Israel) Hapoel Tel Aviv	Loan return	Summer	2017	Deal for 2 Players	Maccbi Haifa
24	MF	(Spain)	Míchel	28	EU	(Spain) Getafe	Transfer	Summer	2015	Free	Maccabi Haifa
44	GK	(Israel)	Ohad Levita	28	EU	(Israel) Maccabi Netanya	Loan in	Summer	2015	Free	Walla!
4	MF	(Sierra Leone)	Medo	27	EU	(England) Bolton Wanderers	Loan in	Winter	2015	Free	Maccabi Haifa
16	FW	(Israel)	Eliran Atar	27	Non-EU	(France) Stade de Reims	Transfer	Winter	2018	Free	Maccabi Haifa
9	FW	(Israel)	Itay Shechter	27	Non-EU	(France) FC Nantes	Transfer	Winter	2018	Free	Maccabi Haifa
3	DF	(Spain)	Abraham Paz	35	EU	(Israel) Bnei Sakhnin	Transfer	Winter	2016	Free	Maccabi Haifa

Total spending: ▼

=== Transfers out ===
No.	Pos.	Nat.	Name	Age	EU	Moving to	Type	Transfer window	Transfer fee	Source
20	MF	(Israel)	Yaniv Katan	33	Non-EU		Retirement	Summer	Free	
33	GK	(Serbia)	Bojan Šaranov	26	EU	Ergotelis (Greece)	Released	Summer	Free	
29	DF	(Ukraine)	Andriy Pylyavskyi	25	EU	Zorya Luhansk	Released	Summer	Free	
9	FW	(Hungary)	Tamás Priskin	27	EU	Austria Wien	End of contract	Summer	Loan return	
5	DF	(Israel)	Sari Falah	22	Non-EU	Hapoel Tel Aviv	Released	Summer	Part of Dgani deal	
15	MF	(Israel)	Eyal Golasa	22	Non-EU	PAOK (Greece)	End of contract	Summer	Free	
—	MF	(Israel)	Sintayehu Sallalich	23	Non-EU	Maribor (Slovenia)	End of contract	Summer	Free	
—	FW	(Israel)	Hen Azriel	25	Non-EU	Free agent	Released	Summer	Free	
—	DF	(Israel)	Itzik Cohen	31	Non-EU	Bnei Sakhnin	Released	Summer	Free	
—	FW	(Israel)	Shlomi Azulay	24	Non-EU	Hapoel Tel Aviv	Transfer	Summer	Part of Dgani deal	
24	FW	(Israel)	Shoval Gozlan	20	Non-EU	Hapoel Tel Aviv	Loan Out	Summer	Free	
—	FW	(Israel)	Shahar Hirsh	21	Non-EU	Hapoel Petah Tikva	Loan Out	Summer	Free	
16	MF	(Israel)	Ismaeel Ryan	20	Non-EU	Bnei Sakhnin	Loan Out	Summer	Free	
44	GK	(Israel)	Ron Shushan	21	Non-EU	Hapoel Nazareth Illit	Loan Out	Summer	Free	
31	MF	(Israel)	Adi Konstantinos	19	Non-EU	Hapoel Acre	Loan Out	Summer	Free	
9	FW	(Cameroon)	Mohammadou Idrissou	34	Non-EU	Free agent	Released	Winter	Free	
4	DF	(Israel)	Matan Ohayon	28	Non-EU	Hapoel Tel Aviv	Released	Winter	Free	
25	MF	(Bosnia and Herzegovina)	Edin Cocalić	27	EU	Mechelen (Belgium)	Released	Winter	Free	
19	FW	(Israel)	Shimon Abuhatzira	28	Non-EU	Ironi Kiryat Shmona	Loan Out	Winter	Free	
2	DF	(Israel)	Ayid Habshi	19	Non-EU	Bnei Sakhnin	Loan Out	Winter	Free	
23	MF	(Israel)	Ataa Jaber	20	Non-EU	Bnei Sakhnin	Loan Out	Winter	Free	
9	MF	(Israel)	Mohammed Kalibat	24	Non-EU	Bnei Sakhnin	Loan Out	Winter	Free	

Total income: ▲ Expenditure: ▲

=== Players out on loan ===
No.	Pos.	Nation	Player
—	DF	ISR	Ayid Habshi (at Bnei Sakhnin until 30 June 2015)
—	MF	ISR	Ataa Jaber (at Bnei Sakhnin until 30 June 2015)
—	MF	ISR	Mohammed Kalibat (at Bnei Sakhnin until 30 June 2015)
—	DF	ISR	Itzik Cohen (at Bnei Sakhnin until 30 June 2015)
—	MF	ISR	Ismaeel Ryan (at Bnei Sakhnin until 30 June 2015)
—	FW	ISR	Mohammad Ghadir (at Bnei Sakhnin until 30 June 2015)
—	GK	ISR	Ron Shushan (at Hapoel Nazareth Illit until 30 June 2015)
—	MF	ISR	Eran Malchin (at Hapoel Nazareth Illit until 30 June 2015)
—	MF	ISR	Yaniv Brik (at Hapoel Nazareth Illit until 30 June 2015)
—	FW	ISR	Haythem Halabi (at Hapoel Nazareth Illit until 30 June 2015)
—	MF	ISR	Dor Kochav (at Hapoel Petah Tikva until 30 June 2015)

No.	Pos.	Nation	Player
—	FW	ISR	Shahar Hirsh (at Hapoel Petah Tikva until 30 June 2015)
—	FW	ISR	Dor Hugi (at Hapoel Petah Tikva until 30 June 2015)
—	MF	ISR	Adi Konstantinos (at Hapoel Acre until 30 June 2015)
—	FW	ISR	Raz Stain (at Hapoel Acre until 30 June 2015)
—	DF	ISR	Yuval Yosipovich (at Hapoel Afula until 30 June 2015)
—	MF	ISR	Micha Louta (at Hapoel Afula until 30 June 2015)
—	DF	ISR	Akram Sarich (at Hapoel Bnei Lod until 30 June 2015)
—	DF	ISR	Ahmed Shaban (at Hapoel Bnei Lod until 30 June 2015)
—	FW	ISR	Shoval Gozlan (at Hapoel Ra'anana until 30 June 2015)
—	DF	ISR	Baha Halabi (at Hakoah Amidar Ramat Gan until 30 June 2015)

=== Current coaching staff ===
Position	Staff
Manager	(Israel) Marco Balbul
Assistant manager	
Sports analyst	
Fitness coach	(Israel) Uri Harel
Goalkeeping coach	(Israel) Giora Antman
Club Administrator	(Israel) Adoram Keisi

== Pre-season and friendlies ==
Win Draw Loss Postponed

12 July 2014 Training	Maccabi Haifa	3 – 1	Hapoel Afula	Haifa
18:00	Ryan 11'; Idrissou 74', 79'	Report	Geva Barkai 27'	Stadium: Kfar Galim Training Ground; Referee: Tzvika Levy

17 July 2014 Training Camp	Maccabi Haifa (Israel)	1 – 1	(Germany) Eintracht Braunschweig	Landeck, Austria
	Idrissou 47'	Report	Nielsen 83'	Stadium: Landeck stadium

20 July 2014 Training Camp	Maccabi Haifa (Israel)	2 – 0	(Azerbaijan) Simurq	Landeck, Austria
18:00	Keinan 28'; Turgeman 70'	Report		Stadium: Landeck stadium

23 July 2014 Training Camp	Maccabi Haifa (Israel)	0 – 2	(France) Lille	Landeck, Austria
		Report	Mendes 15'; Kjær 54'	Stadium: Landeck stadium

26 July 2014 Training Camp	Maccabi Haifa (Israel)	2 – 1	(Germany) Paderborn	Landeck, Austria
18:00	Idrissou 29'; Ryan 75'	Report	Wemmer 78'	Stadium: Landeck stadium

3 August 2014 Training	Maccabi Haifa	3 – 1	F.C. Ashdod	Haifa
18:00	Rayo 15' (pen.); Ezra 21'; Benayoun 56'	Report	Beckel 50' (pen.)	Stadium: Kfar Galim Training Ground; Referee: Guy Bergar

10 August 2014 Training	Maccabi Haifa	5 – 0	Hapoel Nazareth Illit	Haifa
19:00	Ezra 5'; Turgeman 7'; Benayoun 20'; Amasha 84'; Vered 90'	Report		Stadium: Kfar Galim Training Ground; Referee: Tzvika Levy

1 September 2014 Training	Maccabi Haifa	4 – 2	Hapoel Nazareth Illit	Haifa
18:30	Vered 11'; Idrissou 14'; Zenati 75'; Gabai 84'	Report	Malkin 30' (pen.); Owusu 35'	Stadium: Kfar Galim Training Ground; Referee: Guy Bergar

17 September 2014 Training	Maccabi Haifa	2 - 3	Maccabi Ahi Nazareth	Haifa
17:30	Turgeman 21'; Amasha 56'	Report	Exbard 10'; Gomez 14', 67'	Stadium: Kfar Galim Training Ground; Referee: Tzvika Levy

13 October 2014 Training	Maccabi Haifa	3 – 0	Hapoel Acre	Haifa
16:00	Rayo 26'; Ezra 36'; Abuhatzira 80'	Report		Stadium: Kfar Galim Training Ground

18 November 2014 Training	Maccabi Haifa	7 – 0	Hapoel Afula	Haifa
17:00	Abuhatzira 7', 40'; Míchel 10'; Turgeman 26', 35'; Ezra 34'; Keinan 72'	Report		Stadium: Kfar Galim Training Ground

17 March 2015 Training	Maccabi Haifa	5 – 1	F.C. Karmiel Safed	Haifa
9:00	Weissman, Rayos; Míchel; Vered	Report	Sahar Dahan	Stadium: Kfar Galim Training Ground

== Competitions ==
=== Ligat Ha'Al ===
==== Regular season ====
Win Draw Loss

- With Aleksandar Stanojević

15 September 2014 1	Maccabi Haifa	4 - 2	Bnei Sakhnin	Haifa
20:55	Ezra 45+3'; Rayos 47', 66', (yellow card) 51'; Abuhatzira 58', (yellow card) 59'; Tawatha (yellow card) 90'	Report	Mevlja (yellow card) 50'; Papadopoulos 64'; Ahmed Nahia 90+1'	Stadium: Sammy Ofer Stadium; Attendance: 28,000; Referee: Alon Yefet

22 September 2014 2	Beitar Jerusalem	1 - 0	Maccabi Haifa	Jerusalem
20:50	Claudemir (yellow card) 26'; Azulay 56'; Dasa (yellow card) 84'; Malul (yellow card) 89'; Klaiman (yellow card) 90+1'	Report	Jaber (yellow card) 37'; Idrissou (yellow card) 59', (red card) 90'; Stojković (yellow card) 85'	Stadium: Teddy Stadium; Attendance: 20,000; Referee: Liran Liany

28 September 2014 3	Maccabi Haifa	3 - 1	Hapoel Petah Tikva	Haifa
20:15	Ezra 24', (yellow card) 51'; Turgeman 30'; Míchel (yellow card) 41'; Amasha 81'	Report	Abu Zaid 5'; Peso (yellow card) 24'; Kale (yellow card) 48'	Stadium: Sammy Ofer Stadium; Attendance: 23,800; Referee: Eitan Shmuelevitz

20 October 2014 4	Maccabi Tel Aviv	3 - 1	Maccabi Haifa	Tel Aviv
20:50	Ben Haim (yellow card) 17'; Tawatha 53' (o.g.); Alberman (yellow card) 77'; Ben Basat 81'	Report	Cocalić (yellow card) 80' (yellow-red card); Meshumar (red card) 23'; Rayos 59' (pen.); Míchel (yellow card) 71'	Stadium: Bloomfield Stadium; Attendance: 13,800; Referee: Orel Greenfeld

25 October 2014 5	Maccabi Haifa	0 - 2	Hapoel Ra'anana	Haifa
19:30	Amasha (yellow card) 29'; Dgani (yellow card) 51'	Report	Kangwa 13'; Nwakaeme 52'; Sass (yellow card) 56'; Yanko (yellow card) 69'	Stadium: Sammy Ofer Stadium; Attendance: 20,500; Referee: Gal Leibovich

28 October 2014 6	Hapoel Be'er Sheva	2 - 0	Maccabi Haifa	Be'er Sheva
20:50	Arbeitman 17', (yellow card) 50'; Barda (penalty missed) 53'; Gordana 77'	Report	Keinan (yellow card) 22'; Ezra 30'; Míchel (yellow card) 57'; Moyal (yellow card) 60'	Stadium: Vasermil Stadium; Attendance: 10,000; Referee: Menashe Mashiach

1 November 2014 7	Maccabi Petah Tikva	1 - 0	Maccabi Haifa	Petah Tikva
17:00	Mununga 51'; Dor Elo (yellow card) 83'	Report		Stadium: HaMoshava Stadium; Attendance: 5,200; Referee: Alon Yefet

8 November 2014 8	Maccabi Haifa	1 - 0	Hapoel Acre	Haifa
17:00	Dgani (yellow card) 40'; Abuhatzira 76', (yellow card) 77'	Report	Dora (yellow card) 24'; Jovanović (yellow card) 45'; Avidor (yellow card) 49'; Elior Seiderer (yellow card) 90'	Stadium: Sammy Ofer Stadium; Attendance: 20,123; Referee: Erez Papeir

22 November 2014 9	F.C. Ashdod	1 - 0	Maccabi Haifa	Ashdod
19:30	Lior Inbroom (yellow card) 54'; Míchel 81' (o.g.)	Report	Ohayon (yellow card) 68'; Turgeman (yellow card) 74'; Dgani (yellow card) 84'	Stadium: Yud-Alef Stadium; Attendance: 3,000; Referee: Menashe Messiah

30 November 2014 10	Maccabi Haifa	3 - 1	Hapoel Tel Aviv	Haifa
20:55	Ezra 9'; Amasha 36'; Meshumar (yellow card) 55'; Vered 90+3'	Report	Ikande (yellow card) 85'; Vermouth 89' (pen.)	Stadium: Sammy Ofer Stadium; Attendance: 29,000; Referee: Alon Yefet

3 December 2014 11	Maccabi Netanya	0 - 4	Maccabi Haifa	Netanya
19:30	Levy (yellow card) 24'; Gavish (yellow card) 29'; Saba (yellow card) 68'	Report	Amasha 10', 26', 45'; Boccoli (yellow card) 34'; Meshumar (yellow card) 45'; Vered 87'	Stadium: Netanya Stadium; Attendance: 9,200; Referee: Ziv Adler

6 December 2014 12	Maccabi Haifa	1 - 3	Ironi Kiryat Shmona	Haifa
17:00	Abuhatzira (yellow card) 65'; Vered 76'; Dgani (yellow card) 82'; Cocalić (yellow card) 85'	Report	Mizrahi (yellow card) 11', (goal) 24'; Kola 18', 90+1', (yellow card) 31'	Stadium: Sammy Ofer Stadium; Attendance: 28,000; Referee: Orel Greenfeld

14 December 2014 13	Hapoel Haifa	0 - 4	Maccabi Haifa	Haifa
20:55	Ricketts (yellow card) 15'; Shabtay (yellow card) 39'	Report	Benayoun 4'; Vered 44', (yellow card) 53'; Cocalić (yellow card) 45'; Míchel 73'; Abuhatzira 81'	Stadium: Sammy Ofer Stadium; Attendance: 24,000; Referee: Eli Hakmon

20 December 2014 14	Bnei Sakhnin	1 - 1	Maccabi Haifa	Sakhnin
18:45	Khalaila (yellow card) 44'; Bojović 90'	Report	Boccoli (yellow card) 19'; Abuhatzira (yellow card) 52'; Edin Cocalić 71'	Stadium: Doha Stadium; Attendance: 5,000; Referee: Erez Papeir

27 December 2014 15	Maccabi Haifa	1 - 3	Beitar Jerusalem	Haifa
20:00	Míchel (yellow card) 22'; Boccoli (red card) 69'; Turgeman 75'; Tawatha (yellow card) 90'	Report	Haimovich (yellow card) 46'; Matović (yellow card) 63'; Cohen 83', 86', (yellow card) 84'; Claudemir (yellow card) 84'; Swisa 90+4', (yellow card) 90+4'	Stadium: Sammy Ofer Stadium; Attendance: 29,200; Referee: Ziv Adler

- With Marco Balbul

4 January 2015 16	Hapoel Petah Tikva	2 - 2	Maccabi Haifa	Petah Tikva
20:15	Altman 62'; Dayan 62' (pen.); Zhairi (red card) 88'	Report	Vered 4'; Keinan (yellow card) 18'; Ezra 25'; Stojković (yellow card) 45'; Abuhatzira (yellow card) 79'	Stadium: HaMoshava Stadium; Attendance: 4,000; Referee: Liran Liany

11 January 2015 17	Maccabi Haifa	0 - 1	Maccabi Tel Aviv	Haifa
20:55	Keinan (red card) 28'; Edin Cocalić (red card) 77'; Meshumar (yellow card) 44'	Report	Ben Harush (yellow card) 8'; Mitrović (yellow card) 41'; Zahavi 78' (pen.)	Stadium: Sammy Ofer Stadium; Attendance: 29,000; Referee: Daniel Bar Natan

18 January 2015 18	Hapoel Ra'anana	1 - 0	Maccabi Haifa	Netanya
20:15	Binyamin (yellow card) 40'; Mamadou Thiam 49'; Snir Shuker (yellow card) 57'; Vehava (yellow card) 90'	Report	Dgani (yellow card) 20'	Stadium: Netanya Stadium; Attendance: 2,000; Referee: Oren Saminien

24 January 2015 19	Maccabi Haifa	1 - 0	Hapoel Be'er Sheva	Haifa
20:00	Tawatha (yellow card) 36'; Ezra (yellow card) 61'; Turgeman (yellow card) 79'; Medo (yellow card) 82'; Rayos 90+3' (pen.)	Report	Davidzada (yellow card) 29'; Buzaglo (penalty missed) 78'	Stadium: Sammy Ofer Stadium; Attendance: 27,000; Referee: Orel Greenfeld

31 January 2015 20	Maccabi Haifa	0 - 1	Maccabi Petah Tikva	Haifa
17:00	Medo (yellow card) 87'	Report	Dimov 35'	Stadium: Sammy Ofer Stadium; Attendance: 15,000; Referee: Alon Yefet

7 February 2015 21	Hapoel Acre	0 - 0	Maccabi Haifa	Acre
19:20	Abu Nil (yellow card) 51'; Papadopoulos (yellow card) 90'	Report	Turgeman (yellow card) 78'; Atar (yellow card) 81'	Stadium: Acre Municipal Stadium; Attendance: 5,000; Referee: Liran Vaksberger

14 February 2015 22	Maccabi Haifa	5 - 0	F.C. Ashdod	Tel Aviv
17:30	Shechter 8'; Ezra 18', 90'; Medo (yellow card) 41', (goal) 55'; Míchel (yellow card) 65'; Atar 83'	Report	Bello (yellow card) 22'; Tom Mond (yellow card) 74'	Stadium: Bloomfield Stadium; Attendance: 6,000; Referee: Ziv Adler

23 February 2015 23	Hapoel Tel Aviv	2 - 2	Maccabi Haifa	Tel Aviv
20:55	Reichert (yellow card) 9', (goal) 72'; Azulay 37'; Colin (yellow card) 80'	Report	Atar 29', 57'	Stadium: Bloomfield Stadium; Attendance: 13,000; Referee: Orel Greenfeld

2 March 2015 24	Maccabi Haifa	2 - 1	Maccabi Netanya	Haifa
19:55	Atar 57'; Benayoun 65'	Report	Abu Abaid (yellow card) 4'; Romário (yellow card) 24'; Levy 26'; Hassan (yellow card) 43'	Stadium: Sammy Ofer Stadium; Attendance: 23,000; Referee: Menashe Messiah

8 March 2015 25	Ironi Kiryat Shmona	0 - 1	Maccabi Haifa	Kiryat Shmona
20:15	Kola (yellow card) 21'; Kassio (yellow card) 66'	Report	Benayoun 88'	Stadium: Municipal Stadium; Attendance: 4,000; Referee: Ziv Adler

14 March 2015 26	Maccabi Haifa	2 - 0	Hapoel Haifa	Haifa
19:30	Tawatha 45'; Vered 89'	Report	Kijanskas (yellow card) 28'; Cohen (yellow card) 65'; Megrelashvili (yellow card) 87'	Stadium: Sammy Ofer Stadium; Attendance: 25,200; Referee: Liran Liany

===== Table =====
Pos	Team	Pld	W	D	L	GF	GA	GD	Pts	Qualification
4	Beitar Jerusalem	26	10	10	6	38	29	+9	40	Qualification for the championship round
5	Maccabi Petah Tikva	26	10	9	7	28	30	−2	39	Qualification for the championship round
6	Maccabi Haifa	26	11	4	11	38	29	+9	37	Qualification for the championship round
7	Hapoel Ra'anana	26	9	7	10	24	23	+1	34	Qualification for the relegation round
8	Maccabi Netanya	26	9	6	11	37	45	−8	33	Qualification for the relegation round

Source: Israel Football Association
Rules for classification: 1) Points; 2) Goal difference; 3) Matches won; 4) Goals scored; 5) Head-to-head points; 6) Head-to-head goal difference; 7) Head-to-head goals scored; 8) Play-off.

==== Play-off ====
22 March 2015 27	Maccabi Tel Aviv	2 - 1	Maccabi Haifa	Tel Aviv
21:00	Nosa 1'; Yeini (yellow card) 72'; García (yellow card) 79'; Zahavi 89'	Report	Tawatha (yellow card) 58'; Atar 61'; Yadin (yellow card) 88'	Stadium: Bloomfield Stadium; Attendance: 13,000; Referee: Menashe Messiah

5 April 2015 28	Maccabi Haifa	1 - 0	Beitar Jerusalem	Haifa
20:15	Shechter (yellow card) 13'; Benayoun 44'; Stojković (yellow card) 77'	Report		Stadium: Sammy Ofer Stadium; Attendance: 29,300; Referee: Daniel Bar Natan

12 April 2015 29	Hapoel Be'er Sheva	1 - 1	Maccabi Haifa	Be'er Sheva
20:45	Buzaglo 30'; Ejide (yellow card) 36'; Loai Taha (yellow card) 39'	Report	Atar (yellow card) 31', (penalty missed) 38'; Amasha 90'	Stadium: Vasermil Stadium; Attendance: 6,000; Referee: Liran Liany

20 April 2015 30	Maccabi Haifa	0 - 0	Maccabi Petah Tikva	Haifa
20:00	Yadin (yellow card) 10'; Medo (yellow card) 43'	Report	Dor Elo (yellow card) 37'; Omer Danino (yellow card) 42'; Kabha (yellow card) 67'; Ben-Dayan (yellow card) 90+3'	Stadium: Sammy Ofer Stadium; Attendance: 21,150; Referee: Eitan Shmuelevitz

27 April 2015 31	Ironi Kiryat Shmona	1 - 0	Maccabi Haifa	Kiryat Shmona
20:30	Kola 65'	Report	Shechter (yellow card) 32'	Stadium: Municipal Stadium; Attendance: 2,100; Referee: Guy Bergar

4 May 2015 32	Maccabi Haifa	1 - 1	Maccabi Tel Aviv	Haifa
20:55	Rayos 35'; Tawatha (yellow card) 39'	Report	Zahavi 11', (yellow card) 33'; García (yellow card) 40'; Alberman (yellow card) 43'	Stadium: Sammy Ofer Stadium; Attendance: 29,000; Referee: Ziv Adler

10 May 2015 33	Beitar Jerusalem	1 - 1	Maccabi Haifa	Jerusalem
20:30	Cohen 17'; Dasa (yellow card) 41'	Report	Scheimann (yellow card) 52'; Amasha 63'; Rayos (yellow card) 52'; Míchel (yellow card) 88'	Stadium: Teddy Stadium; Attendance: Orel Greenfeld; Referee: 16,220

16 May 2015 34	Maccabi Haifa	4 - 0	Hapoel Be'er Sheva	Haifa
15:30	Ezra 8', 17'; Benayoun 49'; Turgeman 79'	Report	Buzaglo (yellow card) 21'	Stadium: Sammy Ofer Stadium; Attendance: 21,100; Referee: Eli Hakmon

25 May 2015 35	Maccabi Petah Tikva	1 - 0	Maccabi Haifa	Petah Tikva
20:55	Omer Danino (yellow card) 12', (goal) 72'; Goldenberg (yellow card) 17'; Joachim Mununga (yellow card) 35'; Peser (yellow card) 78'	Report	Míchel (yellow card) 35'; Dgani (yellow card) 39'; Keinan (yellow card) 42'; Atar (yellow card) 90'	Stadium: HaMoshava Stadium; Attendance: 5,000; Referee: Roei Rainsriber

30 May 2015 36	Maccabi Haifa	4 - 1	Ironi Kiryat Shmona	Haifa
17:15	Keinan 40'; Atar 58'; Rayos 61' (pen.); Shechter 83' (pen.); Scheimann (yellow card) 87'	Report	Rochet 45'; Elkayam (yellow card) 75'	Stadium: Sammy Ofer Stadium; Attendance: 12,300; Referee: Oren Saminien

===== Table =====
Pos	Team	Pld	W	D	L	GF	GA	GD	Pts	Qualification
1	Maccabi Tel Aviv (Note: Maccabi Tel Aviv and Beitar Jerusalem each deducted one point.) (C)	36	21	9	6	67	32	+35	70	Qualification for the Champions League second qualifying round
2	Ironi Kiryat Shmona	36	18	10	8	53	38	+15	64	Qualification for the Europa League third qualifying round (Note: Since Maccabi Tel Aviv won the 2014–15 Israel State Cup, then the 2nd-positioned team will be awarded with entry to the third qualifying round of the UEFA Europa League.)
3	Hapoel Be'er Sheva	36	17	11	8	63	40	+23	62	Qualification for the Europa League second qualifying round
4	Beitar Jerusalem	36	13	13	10	48	43	+5	51	Qualification for the Europa League first qualifying round
5	Maccabi Haifa	36	14	8	14	51	37	+14	50	
6	Maccabi Petah Tikva	36	12	12	12	34	41	−7	48	

Source: Israel Football Association
Rules for classification: 1) Points; 2) Goal difference; 3) Matches won; 4) Goals scored; 5) Head-to-head points; 6) Head-to-head goal difference; 7) Head-to-head goals scored; 8) Play-off.
(C) Champions

==== Results summary ====
Overall								Home						Away					
Pld	W	D	L	GF	GA	GD	Pts	W	D	L	GF	GA	GD	W	D	L	GF	GA	GD
36	14	8	14	51	37	+14	50	11	2	5	33	17	+16	3	6	9	18	20	−2

Last updated: 30 May 2015.
Source: Competitive matches

==== Results by round ====
Round	1	2	3	4	5	6	7	8	9	10	11	12	13	14	15	16	17	18	19	20	21	22	23	24	25	26	27	28	29	30	31	32	33	34	35	36
Ground	H	A	H	A	H	A	A	H	A	H	A	H	A	A	H	A	H	A	H	H	A	H	A	H	A	H	A	H	A	H	A	H	A	H	A	H
Result	W	L	W	L	L	L	L	W	L	W	W	L	W	D	L	D	L	L	W	L	D	W	D	W	W	W	L	W	D	D	L	D	D	W	L	W
Position	3	7	4	6	8	8	11	8	10	6	5	7	5	4	4	5	8	11	9	9	9	7	8	7	6	6	6	5	5	5	5	5	4	5	5	5

Source: Competitive Matches
A = Away; H = Home; W = Win; D = Draw; L = Loss

=== State Cup ===
==== Round of 32 ====
14 January 2015 Round of 32	Hapoel Nir Ramat HaSharon	1 - 3 (a.e.t.)	Maccabi Haifa	Ramat HaSharon, Israel
19:00	Ben Azubel 21', (yellow card) 74'; Yarden Sagiv (yellow card) 32'; Maor Kandil (yellow card) 102'	Report	Tawatha (yellow card) 12'; Ezra 39'; Turgeman (yellow card) 69'; Rayo 103'; Amasha 109'	Stadium: Grundman Stadium; Attendance: Eitan Smuelavich; Referee: 1,000

==== Round of 16 ====
28 January 2015 Round of 16	Maccabi Haifa	1 - 1 (1 – 3 p)	Ironi Kiryat Shmona	Haifa
21:00	Medo (yellow card) 34'; Turgeman (yellow card) 72'; Cocalić (yellow card) 101'; Rayos 111' (pen.); Vered (yellow card) 119'	Report	Brown (yellow card) 57'; Abed (yellow card) 87'; Kahat 103' (pen.); Tzedek (yellow card) 110'	Stadium: Sammy Ofer Stadium; Attendance: 14,500; Referee: Erez Papeir
	Penalties
	Rayos (penalty scored); Turgeman (penalty missed); Gabai (penalty missed); Cocalić (penalty missed)		Kahat (penalty missed); Tzedek (penalty scored); Manga (penalty scored); Mizrahi (penalty scored)

=== Toto Cup ===
==== Group stage ====
13 August 2014 1	Maccabi Haifa	2 – 1	Hapoel Acre	Netanya
20:50	Kalibat 79'; Vered 90'	Report	Salihi 27'; Shaban (yellow card) 89'	Stadium: Netanya Stadium; Attendance: 9,000; Referee: Erez Papier

16 August 2014 2	Ironi Kiryat Shmona	0 – 1	Maccabi Haifa	Kiryat Shmona
18:30	Tzedek (yellow card) 90'	Report	Turgeman 42'	Stadium: Kiryat Shmona Stadium; Attendance: 2,000; Referee: Ziv Adler

19 August 2014 3	Maccabi Haifa	2 – 0	Hapoel Haifa	Netanya
20:30	Moyal (yellow card) 73'; Rayos 79' 90'	Report	Kovář (yellow card) 90'	Stadium: Netanya Stadium; Attendance: 9,500; Referee: Eli Hakmon

26 August 2014 4	Bnei Sakhnin	2 – 0	Maccabi Haifa	Ilut
19:45	Ryan 5'; Habshi 65' (o.g.)	Report		Stadium: Ilut Stadium; Attendance: 500; Referee: Menashe Messiah

Pos	Team	Pld	W	D	L	GF	GA	GD	Pts
1	Maccabi Haifa (A)	4	3	0	1	5	3	+2	9
2	Bnei Sakhnin (A)	4	2	2	0	8	5	+3	8
3	Hapoel Haifa (A)	4	2	1	1	7	5	+2	7
4	Ironi Kiryat Shmona	4	0	2	2	2	3	−1	2
5	Hapoel Acre	4	0	1	3	4	8	−4	1

Source: football.org.il (in Hebrew)
Rules for classification: 1st points; 2nd goal difference; 3rd matches won; 4th goals scored; 5th head-to-head; 6th decision match
(A) Advanced to the quarterfinals

==== Knockout phase ====
===== Quarter-final =====
6 September 2014 First Leg	Bnei Sakhnin	1-1	Maccabi Haifa	Sakhnin
20:30	Mevlja (yellow card) 37'; Mugrabi 60'; Ottman (yellow card) 66'	Report	Idrissou (yellow card) 17'; Boccoli (yellow card) 21'; Dgani (yellow card) 61'; Cocalić 67', (yellow card) 90'	Stadium: Doha Stadium; Attendance: 1,500; Referee: Erez Papier

10 September 2014 Second Leg	Maccabi Haifa	5 - 3	Bnei Sakhnin	Netanya
20:20	Abuhatzira 2'; Idrissou 23', 52'; Míchel (yellow card) 44'; Ezra (yellow card) 70'; Keinan (yellow card) 78'; Rayos 86'; Turgeman (yellow card) 88'; Vered 90'	Report	Ghadir 5', 49', (yellow card) 24'; Paz 65'	Stadium: Netanya Stadium; Attendance: 2,000; Referee: Eitan Smuelavich

Maccabi Haifa won 6–4 on aggregate

===== Semi-final =====
17 December 2014 Semi-final	Maccabi Haifa	3 - 1	F.C. Ashdod	Netanya
19:00	Rayo 4'; Ezra 19'; Turgeman 59'	Report	Oshaniwa (yellow card) 43'; Abd Elhamed (yellow card) 73'; Abu Anza 90'	Stadium: Netanya Stadium; Attendance: Liran Vaksberger; Referee: 2,500

===== Final =====
31 December 2014 Final	Maccabi Haifa	1 - 2	Maccabi Tel Aviv	Netanya
19:30	Ohayon (yellow card) 47'; Eitan Tibi 57' (o.g.)	Report	Ohayon 41' (o.g.); Ziv (yellow card) 37'; Mitrović (yellow card) 73', (goal) 82' (pen.); Einbinder (yellow card) 87'	Stadium: Netanya Stadium; Attendance: 13,500; Referee: Menashe Messiah

== Squad statistics ==
Updated on 30 May 2015

			Ligat Ha'Al					State Cup					Toto Cup					Total				
Nation	No.	Name		GS	Min.	Goal	Assist		GS	Min.	Goal	Assist		GS	Min.	Goal	Assist		GS	Min.	Goal	Assist
Goalkeepers
(Israel)	22	Amir Edri	0	0	0	0	0	0	0	0	0	0	0	0	0	0	0	0	0	0	0	0
(Serbia)	38	Vladimir Stojković	35	35	3,150	0	1	2	2	240	0	0	4	4	360	0	0	41	41	3,750	0	1
(Israel)	44	Ohad Levita	1	1	90	0	0	0	0	0	0	0	3	3	270	0	0	4	4	360	0	0
Defenders
(Spain)	3	Abraham Paz	13	13	1,170	0	0	0	0	0	0	0	0	0	0	0	0	13	13	1,170	0	0
(Israel)	5	Elad Gabai	13	12	1,098	0	1	1	1	120	0	0	0	1	28	0	0	15	13	1,248	0	1
(Israel)	12	Orel Dgani	33	33	2,970	0	0	1	1	120	0	0	3	3	265	0	0	38	38	3,475	0	0
(Israel)	13	Taleb Tawatha	30	30	2,594	1	4	2	2	240	0	0	2	2	180	0	0	34	34	3,014	1	4
(Israel)	18	Samuel Scheimann	9	6	609	0	0	0	0	0	0	0	7	6	556	0	2	16	12	1,165	0	2
(Israel)	21	Dekel Keinan	14	14	1,141	1	0	1	1	120	0	0	8	6	569	0	0	23	21	1,830	1	0
(Israel)	27	Eyal Meshumar	19	18	1,424	0	0	1	1	120	0	0	2	2	180	0	0	22	21	1,724	0	0
Midfielders
(Sierra Leone)	4	Medo	16	16	1,428	1	0	1	1	120	0	0	0	0	0	0	0	17	17	1,548	1	0
(Israel)	6	Ran Abukarat	0	0	0	0	0	0	0	0	0	0	0	0	0	0	0	0	0	0	0	0
(Israel)	7	Gustavo Boccoli	12	10	811	0	0	2	1	213	0	0	7	4	434	0	0	21	15	1,457	0	0
(Israel)	8	Hen Ezra	36	32	2,798	8	11	2	2	165	1	1	8	6	468	1	2	46	40	3,431	10	14
(Spain)	10	Rubén Rayos	27	17	1,801	6	3	2	1	166	2	0	6	5	441	4	1	35	23	2,408	12	4
(Israel)	11	Idan Vered	28	8	1,046	6	1	2	1	172	0	0	7	2	225	2	0	37	11	1,440	8	1
(Israel)	15	Yossi Benayoun	26	24	1,949	5	4	1	1	120	0	0	4	4	297	0	0	31	29	2,369	5	4
(Spain)	24	Míchel	25	16	1,438	1	0	1	1	10	0	0	2	1	90	0	0	28	18	1,539	1	0
(Israel)	26	Avihay Yadin	15	14	1,099	0	0	0	0	0	0	0	0	0	0	0	0	15	14	1,099	0	0
(Israel)	32	Kobi Moyal	8	5	384	0	0	0	0	0	0	0	4	2	144	0	0	12	7	528	0	0
Forwards
(Israel)	9	Itay Shechter	14	10	839	2	0	0	0	0	0	0	0	0	0	0	0	14	10	839	2	0
(Israel)	14	Weaam Amasha	26	14	1,320	7	3	2	2	180	1	1	7	3	336	0	1	35	19	1,835	7	5
(Israel)	16	Eliran Atar	15	12	1,176	6	2	0	0	0	0	0	0	0	0	0	0	15	12	1,176	6	2
(Israel)	17	Alon Turgeman	23	11	1,017	3	2	2	1	150	0	0	7	4	368	2	1	32	16	1,542	5	3
(Israel)	28	Shon Weissman	2	0	30	0	0	1	0	8	0	0	0	0	0	0	0	3	0	38	0	0
(Israel)		Mohammed Awaed	0	0	0	0	0	0	0	0	0	0	1	0	5	0	0	0	0	0	1	5
Players who no longer play for Maccabi Haifa
(Israel)	2	Ayid Habshi	0	0	0	0	0	0	0	0	0	0	3	3	270	0	0	3	3	270	0	0
(Israel)	4	Matan Ohayon	9	4	556	0	0	1	1	120	0	0	5	5	434	0	0	15	10	1,128	0	0
(Israel)	9	Mohammed Kalibat	7	3	247	0	2	0	0	0	0	0	8	4	374	1	1	15	7	621	1	3
(Cameroon)	9	Mohammadou Idrissou	5	5	432	0	0	0	0	0	0	0	5	4	355	2	0	10	9	787	2	0
(Israel)	19	Shimon Abuhatzira	15	9	697	3	2	1	0	17	0	0	3	2	142	1	1	19	11	856	4	3
(Israel)	23	Jaber Ataa	13	10	846	0	0	1	1	120	0	1	7	7	486	0	0	21	18	1,452	0	1
(Bosnia and Herzegovina)	25	Edin Cocalić	14	14	1,227	1	0	1	1	120	0	0	6	5	450	1	0	21	20	1,797	2	0
(Israel)	31	Adi Konstantinos	0	0	0	0	0	0	0	0	0	0	2	0	29	0	0	2	0	29	0	0
(Israel)	44	Ron Shushan	0	0	0	0	0	0	0	0	0	0	1	1	90	0	0	1	1	90	0	0

=== Goals ===
Rank	Player	Position	Ligat Ha'Al	State Cup	Toto Cup	Total
1	(Spain) Rubén Rayos	MF	6	2	4	12
2	(Israel) Hen Ezra	MF	8	1	1	10
3	(Israel) Weaam Amasha	FW	7	1	0	8
3	(Israel) Idan Vered	MF	6	0	2	8
4	(Israel) Eliran Atar	FW	6	0	0	6
5	(Israel) Yossi Benayoun	MF	5	0	0	5
5	(Israel) Alon Turgeman	FW	3	0	2	5
5	(Israel) Shimon Abuhatzira	FW	3	0	1	4
6	(Israel) Itay Shechter	FW	2	0	0	2
6	(Bosnia and Herzegovina) Edin Cocalić	DF	1	0	1	2
6	(Cameroon) Mohammadou Idrissou	FW	0	0	2	2
7	(Spain) Míchel	MF	1	0	0	1
7	(Sierra Leone) Medo	MF	1	0	0	1
7	(Israel) Taleb Tawatha	DF	1	0	0	1
7	(Israel) Dekel Keinan	FW	1	0	0	1
7	(Israel) Mohammed Kalibat	FW	0	0	1	1
Own goals			0	0	1	1
Total			51	4	15	70

=== Disciplinary record ===
Last updated on 2 May 2015

Pos	Nat	Name	Ligat Ha'Al			State Cup			Total			Suspended
Pos	Nat	Name	Yellow card	(yellow card) (yellow-red card)	Red card	Yellow card	(yellow card) (yellow-red card)	Red card	Yellow card	(yellow card) (yellow-red card)	Red card	
MF	(Spain)	Míchel	7						7			
DF	(Israel)	Taleb Tawatha	5			1			6			
DF	(Israel)	Orel Dgani	6						6			
MF	(Sierra Leone)	Medo	4			1			5			
FW	(Israel)	Alon Turgeman	3			2			5			
DF	(Spain)	Abraham Paz	5						5			
GK	(Serbia)	Vladimir Stojković	3			1			4			
MF	(Israel)	Hen Ezra	3						3			
DF	(Israel)	Eyal Meshumar	3		1				3		1	
DF	(Israel)	Dekel Keinan	3		1				3		1	
FW	(Israel)	Eliran Atar	3						3			
FW	(Israel)	Itay Shechter	3						3			
MF	(Israel)	Gustavo Boccoli	2	1					2	1		
MF	(Israel)	Idan Vered	1			1			2			
MF	(Spain)	Avihay Yadin	2						2			
DF	(Israel)	Samuel Scheimann	2						2			
MF	(Spain)	Rubén Rayos	1						1			
FW	(Israel)	Weaam Amasha	1						1			
MF	(Israel)	Kobi Moyal	1						1			
FW	(Israel)	Shimon Abuhatzira	5						5			
DF	(Bosnia and Herzegovina)	Edin Cocalić	3	2		1			4	2		
DF	(Israel)	Matan Ohayon	2						2			
FW	(Cameroon)	Mohammadou Idrissou	1		1				1		1	
MF	(Israel)	Jaber Ataa	1						1			
Total			70	3	3	7			77	3	3	

==== Disciplinary record Toto Cup ====
No.	Pos.	Name	Disciplinary record Toto Cup		Notes
No.	Pos.	Name	Yellow card	Red card	
32	MF	Kobi Moyal	1	0	
7	FW	Gustavo Boccoli	1	0	
12	DF	Orel Dgani	1	0	
24	MF	Míchel	1	0	
8	MF	Hen Ezra	1	0	
21	DF	Dekel Keinan	1	0	
17	FW	Alon Turgeman	1	0	
25	DF	Edin Cocalić	1	0	
4	DF	Matan Ohayon	1	0	
9	FW	Mohammadou Idrissou	1	0	

=== Penalties ===
Date	Penalty Taker	Scored	Opponent	Competition
20 October 2014	Rubén Rayos	Yes	Maccabi Tel Aviv	Ligat Ha'Al
24 January 2015	Rubén Rayos	Yes	Hapoel Be'er Sheva	Ligat Ha'Al
28 January 2015	Rubén Rayos	Yes	Ironi Kiryat Shmona	State Cup
12 April 2015	Eliran Atar	No	Hapoel Be'er Sheva	Ligat Ha'Al
30 May 2015	Rubén Rayos	Yes	Ironi Kiryat Shmona	Ligat Ha'Al
30 May 2015	Itay Shechter	Yes	Hapoel Be'er Sheva	Ligat Ha'Al

=== Overall ===
	Total	Home	Away	Naturel
Games played	45	22	22	2
Games won	20	14	5	1
Games drawn	9	2	7	-
Games lost	17	6	10	1
Biggest win	5-0 vs F.C. Ashdod	5-0 vs F.C. Ashdod	4-0 vs Maccabi Netanya 4-0 vs Hapoel Haifa	3-1 vs F.C. Ashdod
Biggest loss	0-2 vs Bnei Sakhnin; 1-3 vs Maccabi Tel Aviv; 0-2 vs Hapoel Ra'anana; 0-2 vs Hapoel Be'er Sheva; 1-3 vs Hapoel Ironi Kiryat Shmona; 1-3 Beitar Jerusalem (1–3 p) 1–3 vs Hapoel Ironi Kiryat Shmona	0-2 vs Hapoel Ra'anana; 1-3 Hapoel Ironi Kiryat Shmona; 1-3 Beitar Jerusalem (1–3 p) vs Hapoel Ironi Kiryat Shmona	0-2 vs Bnei Sakhnin; 1-3 vs Maccabi Tel Aviv; 0-2 vs Hapoel Be'er Sheva	1-2 vs Maccabi Tel Aviv
Biggest win (League)	5-0 vs F.C. Ashdod	5-0 vs F.C. Ashdod	4-0 vs Maccabi Netanya; 4-0 vs Hapoel Haifa	N/A
Biggest loss (League)	1-3 vs Maccabi Tel Aviv; 0-2 vs Hapoel Ra'anana; 1-3 vs Hapoel Ironi Kiryat Shmona; 1-3 Beitar Jerusalem	0-2 vs Hapoel Ra'anana; 1-3 vs Hapoel Ironi Kiryat Shmona; 1-3 Beitar Jerusalem	1-3 vs Maccabi Tel Aviv; 0-2 vs Hapoel Be'er Sheva	N/A
Biggest win (Cup)	3-1 vs Ironi Ramat HaSharon	-	3-1 vs Ironi Ramat HaSharon	–
Biggest loss (Cup)	(1–3 p) vs Hapoel Ironi Kiryat Shmona	(1–3 p) vs Hapoel Ironi Kiryat Shmona	-	-
Biggest win (Toto)	2-0 vs Hapoel Haifa; 5-3 vs Bnei Sakhnin; 3-1 vs F.C. Ashdod	2-0 vs Hapoel Haifa; 5-3 vs Bnei Sakhnin	1-0 vs Hapoel Ironi Kiryat Shmona	3-1 vs F.C. Ashdod
Biggest loss (Toto)	0-2 vs Bnei Sakhnin	-	0-2 vs Bnei Sakhnin	1-2 vs Maccabi Tel Aviv
Clean sheets	12	7	5	0
Goals scored	70	43	23	4
Goals conceded	48	22	23	3
Goal difference	+22	+21	-	+1
Average GF per game	1.5	1.86	1.1	2
Average GA per game	1.07	1	1.1	1.5
Yellow cards	70	34	35	1
Red cards	6	3	3	0
Most appearances	(Israel) Hen Ezra (44)	–		
Most minutes played	(Serbia) Vladimir Stojković (3,660)	–		
Most goals	(Spain) Rubén Rayos (11)	–		
Winning rate	43.18%	61.9%	23.81%	50%

Source: Competitive matches
