= 2016–17 Maccabi Petah Tikva F.C. season =

Maccabi Petah Tikva F.C.
2016–17 season
- Chairman: Amos Luzon
- Manager: Kobi Refua
- Israeli Premier League: 4th
- State Cup: Quarter-finals
- Toto Cup: Group stage
- Top goalscorer: League: Gidi Kanyuk (10); All: Guy Melamed (13)
Home colours	Away colours	Third colours

The 2016–17 Maccabi Petah Tikva season was the club's 107th season since its establishment in 1912, and 4th straight season in the Israeli Premier League since promoting from Liga Leumit in 2012–13.

During the 2016–17 campaign the club have competed in the Israeli Premier League, State Cup, Toto Cup.

== Season review ==
Following the departure of Dani Golan at the end of the previous season, the club signed the team's former player and manager Kobi Refua.

The club started the season in the Toto Cup, but failed to progress beyond the group stage. In the League, the club went off to a good start, reaching second place after 5 rounds and losing only 4 matches in the regular season, including remaining unbeaten for 10 matches, securing its place in the championship playoffs. However, a run of 7 losses meant the club lost the third place to Beitar Jerusalem by the end of the season, and with Bnei Yehuda Tel Aviv winning the cup (with a penalty victory over second-placed Maccabi Tel Aviv, the club failed to reach the Europa League.

Throughout the season, the club played 44 matches, winning 18, drawing 11 and losing 15. Two players, Gidi Kanyuk and Guy Melamed placed in the league's top ten scorers.

== Match results ==
=== Legend ===
Win	Draw	Loss

=== League ===
Pos	Team	Pld	W	D	L	GF	GA	GD	Pts	Qualification or relegation
1	Hapoel Be'er Sheva	26	18	5	3	54	13	+41	59	Qualification for the Championship round
2	Maccabi Tel Aviv	26	17	5	4	45	19	+26	56	Qualification for the Championship round
3	Maccabi Petah Tikva	26	13	9	4	36	23	+13	48	Qualification for the Championship round
4	Beitar Jerusalem	26	10	10	6	34	27	+7	40	Qualification for the Championship round
5	Bnei Sakhnin	26	10	9	7	26	26	0	39	Qualification for the Championship round

Source: Israel Football Association, Soccerway

Pos	Team	Pld	W	D	L	GF	GA	GD	Pts	Qualification
1	Hapoel Be'er Sheva (C, Q)	36	26	7	3	73	18	+55	85	Qualification for the Champions League second qualifying round
2	Maccabi Tel Aviv (Q)	36	22	6	8	61	28	+33	72	Qualification for the Europa League first qualifying round
3	Beitar Jerusalem (Q)	36	16	12	8	53	36	+17	60	Qualification for the Europa League first qualifying round
4	Maccabi Petah Tikva	36	15	11	10	42	34	+8	56	
5	Bnei Sakhnin	36	13	9	14	32	46	−14	48	
6	Maccabi Haifa	36	12	9	15	34	41	−7	45	

Source: Israel Football Association, Soccerway
(C) Champions; (Q) Qualified for the phase indicated

Date	Opponent	Venue	Result	Scorers	Position
21 August 2016 - 20:00	Beitar Jerusalem	Home	2–2	Mohammad Kalibat, Gidi Kanyuk	7
27 August 2016 - 19:00	Hapoel Ra'anana	Away	1–0	Liroy Zhairi	4
12 September 2016 - 20:30	Hapoel Tel Aviv	Home	2–0	Gidi Kanyuk (2)	3
18 September 2016 - 19:00	Bnei Sakhnin	Away	1–0	Mihai Roman	2
26 September 2016 - 20:30	Maccabi Haifa	Home	2–2	Dor Elo, Liroy Zhairi	2
15 October 2016 - 19:30	Hapoel Be'er Sheva	Away	0–5		3
22 October 2016 - 16:00	Bnei Yehuda	Away	4–1	Gidi Kanyuk, Mihai Roman (2), Mohammad Kalibat	3
30 October 2016 - 19:00	Hapoel Kiryat Shmona	Home	2–1	Guy Melamed (2)	2
6 November 2016 - 20:45	Maccabi Tel Aviv	Away	0–0		2
19 November 2016 - 18:00	Hapoel Ashkelon	Home	1–1	Miahi Roman	4
26 November 2016 - 18:00	Hapoel Haifa	Away	1–2	Liroy Zhairi	4
3 December 2016 - 18:00	Hapoel Kfar Saba	Home	0–0		4
11 December 2016 - 19:00	F.C. Ironi Ashdod	Away	2–2	Gidi Kanyuk (2)	4
17 December 2016 - 20:30	Beitar Jerusalem	Away	1–1	Miahi Roman	4
25 December 2016 - 19:00	Hapoel Ra'anana	Home	2–0	Guy Melamed, Miahi Roman	3
31 December 2016 - 20:30	Hapoel Tel Aviv	Away	1–0	Gidi Kanyuk	3
10 January 2017 - 19:00	Bnei Sakhnin	Home	1–1	Guy Melamed	3
14 January 2017 - 18:15	Maccabi Haifa	Away	2–0	Nenad Adamovic, Guy Melamed	3
21 January 2017 - 20:30	Hapoel Be'er Sheva	Home	1–1	Uri Magbo	3
28 January 2017 - 16:00	Bnei Yehuda	Home	1–0	Mihai Roman, Manor Solomon	3
4 February 2017 - 16:00	Hapoel Kiryat Shmona	Away	1–0	Dovev Gabay	3
13 February 2017 - 21:00	Maccabi Tel Aviv	Home	0–1		3
19 February 2017 - 19:00	Hapoel Ashkelon	Away	1–0	Liroy Zhairi	3
26 February 2017 - 19:00	Hapoel Haifa	Home	3–1	Guy Melamed, Gidi Kanyuk, Romario	3
5 March 2017 - 19:00	Hapoel Kfar Saba	Away	3–1	Guy Melamed (2), Gidi Kanyuk	3
11 March 2017 - 18:00	F.C. Ironi Ashdod	Home	0–1		3
18 March 2017 - 20:30	Beitar Jerusalem	Home	0–1		3
2 April 2017 - 19:00	Bnei Sakhnin	Away	0–1		3
9 April 2017 - 20:10	Hapoel Be'er Sheva	Home	1–2	Gidi Kanyuk	3
15 April 2017 - 20:30	Maccabi Tel Aviv	Away	0–2		3
22 April 2017 - 18:00	Maccabi Haifa	Home	0–1		3
26 April 2017 - 19:45	Beitar Jerusalem	Away	1–2	Guy Melamed	4
29 April 2017 - 18:00	Bnei Sakhnin	Home	1–0	Liroy Zhairi	4
8 May 2017 - 20:00	Hapoel Be'er Sheva	Away	1–1	Lidor Cohen	4
14 May 2017 - 20:15	Maccabi Tel Aviv	Home	2–1	Manor Solomon, Lidor Cohen	4
20 May 2017 - 20:30	Maccabi Haifa	Away	0–0		4

=== State Cup ===
Date	Round	Opponent	Venue	Result	Scorers
7 January 2017 - 16:30	8th round	Maccabi Haifa	Away	2–0	Guy Melamed, Nenad Adamović
24 January 2017 - 19:00	Round of 16	Hapoel Tel Aviv	Away	2–0	Mihai Roman, Guy Melamed
8 February 2017 - 21:00	Quarter-finals (1st leg)	Maccabi Tel Aviv	Home	0–1	
1 March 2017 - 21:00	Quarter-finals (2nd leg)	Maccabi Tel Aviv	Away	1–2	Guy Melamed

Maccabi Petah Tikva lost 1–3 on aggregate.

=== Toto Cup ===
Pos	Team	Pld	W	D	L	GF	GA	GD	Pts	Qualification or relegation
1	Maccabi Tel Aviv	4	3	0	1	7	2	+5	9	Qualified to Quarter-finals
2	Bnei Yehuda	4	2	1	1	5	5	0	7	Qualified to Quarter-finals
3	Hapoel Tel Aviv	4	1	2	1	2	2	0	5	Qualified to Quarter-finals
4	Maccabi Petah Tikva	4	1	1	2	3	3	0	4	
5	Hapoel Ra'anana	4	0	2	2	1	6	−5	2	

Updated to match(es) played on 15 August 2016. Source: Israel Football Association
Rules for classification: 1) points; 2) goal difference; 3) number of wins; 4) goals scored; 5) head to head; 6)deciding match.

Date	Round	Opponent	Venue	Result	Scorers
31 July 2016 - 21:00	Group	Maccabi Tel Aviv	Away	0–1	
3 August 2016 - 19:30	Group	Bnei Yehuda	Home	1–2	Gidi Kanyuk
7 August 2016 - 19:00	Group	Hapoel Ra'anana	Away	2–1	Guy Melamed, Gal Levy
10 August 2016 - 20:00	Group	Hapoel Tel Aviv	Away	0–0	

== Player details ==
List of squad players, including number of appearances by competition

No.	Pos	Nat	Player	Total		Premier League		State Cup		Toto Cup	
No.	Pos	Nat	Player	Apps	Goals	Apps	Goals	Apps	Goals	Apps	Goals
1	GK	(Israel) ISR	Yossi Ginzburg	2	0	2	0	0	0	0	0
16	GK	(Israel) ISR	Zahi Gigi	1	0	0	0	1	0	0	0
82	GK	(Israel) ISR	Danny Amos	41	0	34	0	3	0	4	0
2	DF	(Brazil) BRA	Allyson dos Santos	39	0	31	0	4	0	4	0
3	DF	(Israel) ISR	Omer Danino	29	0	21	0	4	0	4	0
5	DF	(Spain) ESP	Carlos Cuéllar	32	0	30	0	2	0	0	0
7	DF	(Israel) ISR	Hagay Goldenberg	20	0	15	0	1	0	4	0
11	DF	(Israel) ISR	Naor Peser	31	0	25	0	3	0	3	0
14	DF	(Israel) ISR	Shmulik Malul	2	0	2	0	0	0	0	0
23	DF	(Israel) ISR	Omri Luzon	1	0	1	0	0	0	0	0
77	DF	(Israel) ISR	Uri Magbo	16	1	13	1	3	0	0	0
6	MF	(Israel) ISR	Liran Rotman	6	0	6	0	0	0	0	0
10	MF	(Israel) ISR	Lidor Cohen	12	2	11	2	1	0	0	0
17	MF	(Romania) ROU	Viorel Nicoară	3	0	0	0	0	0	3	0
18	MF	(Israel) ISR	Dor Elo	40	1	33	1	3	0	4	0
20	MF	(Israel) ISR	Guy Melamed	35	13	28	9	4	3	3	1
21	MF	(Israel) ISR	Nirel Mahpud	3	0	0	0	0	0	3	0
22	MF	(Serbia) SRB	Nenad Adamović	24	2	21	1	3	1	0	0
26	MF	(Israel) ISR	Gidi Kanyuk	41	11	35	10	3	0	3	1
30	MF	(Spain) ESP	Aitor	27	0	24	0	3	0	0	0
51	MF	(Israel) ISR	Assaf Levy	2	0	0	0	0	0	2	0
52	MF	(Brazil) BRA	Romário Pires	40	1	32	1	4	0	4	0
55	MF	(Israel) ISR	Liroy Zhairi	38	5	33	5	1	0	4	0
70	MF	(Israel) ISR	Mohammed Badir	1	0	0	0	0	0	1	0
78	MF	(Israel) ISR	Gal Levy	12	1	8	0	0	0	4	1
9	FW	(Israel) ISR	Oz Peretz	7	0	3	0	0	0	4	0
9	FW	(Israel) ISR	Dovev Gabay	12	1	10	1	2	0	0	0
10	FW	(Israel) ISR	Mohammed Kalibat	22	2	17	2	2	0	3	0
17	FW	(Romania) ROU	Mihai Roman	38	8	35	7	3	1	0	0
19	FW	(Israel) ISR	Manor Solomon	27	2	23	2	4	0	0	0
25	FW	(Israel) ISR	Avihu Ezer	2	0	1	0	0	0	1	0
32	FW	(Nigeria) NGA	Jacob Njuko	2	0	0	0	0	0	2	0
44	FW	(Israel) ISR	Tai Baribo	5	0	4	0	1	0	0	0

== Transfers ==
=== In ===
No.	Pos.	Nation	Player
—	GK	ISR	Yossi Ginzburg (from (Israel) Maccabi Jaffa)
—	GK	ISR	Danny Amos (from (Israel) Hapoel Acre)
—	DF	ESP	Carlos Cuéllar (from (Spain) Almería)
—	DF	ISR	Shmulik Malul (from (Israel) Hapoel Acre)
—	MF	BRA	Romário Pires (from (Israel) Maccabi Haifa)
—	MF	ISR	Gal Levy (from (Israel) Hapoel Rishon LeZion)
—	MF	ISR	Nirel Mahpud (from (Israel) Hapoel Ashkelon)
—	MF	SRB	Nenad Adamović (from (Belarus) Dinamo Minsk)
—	FW	ISR	Oz Peretz (loan return from (Israel) Hapoel Acre)
—	FW	ROU	Mihai Roman (on loan from (Netherlands) NEC)
—	DF	ISR	Uri Magbo (from (Israel) Beitar Jerusalem)
—	FW	ISR	Dovev Gabay (on loan from (Israel) Bnei Yehuda)

=== Out ===
No.	Pos.	Nation	Player
—	GK	ISR	Itamar Nitzan (loan return to (Israel) Hapoel Ironi Kiryat Shmona)
—	DF	ISR	Oded Gavish (to (Israel) Maccabi Sha'arayim)
—	DF	FRA	Xavier Tomas (to (Israel) Bnei Yehuda Tel Aviv)
—	DF	ISR	Dudu Twito (to (Israel) Maccabi Sha'arayim, his player card still belongs to (Israel) Hapoel Be'er Sheva)
—	GK	ISR	Yam Sasson (to (Israel) Maccabi Sha'arayim)
—	MF	ISR	Mor Shaked (to (Israel) Hapoel Petah Tikva)
—	MF	ISR	Roei Gordana (loan return to (Israel) Hapoel Be'er Sheva)
—	MF	ISR	Omri Shifman (on loan to (Israel) Hapoel Marmorek)
—	MF	ISR	Omer Sharabi (on loan to (Israel) Hapoel Marmorek)
—	MF	ISR	Yuval Jakobovich (to (Romania) ASA 2013 Târgu Mureș)
—	FW	ISR	Dor Hugi (to (Israel) Hapoel Ra'anana, his player card still belongs to (Israel) Maccabi Haifa)
—	FW	SWE	Rade Prica (to (Sweden) Landskrona BoIS)
—	FW	ISR	Idan Shemesh (to (Israel) Bnei Sakhnin)
—	MF	ISR	Nirel Mahpud (on loan to (Israel) Hapoel Ramat Gan)
—	FW	ISR	Mohammed Kalibat (to (Israel) Hapoel Ra'anana)
—	FW	ISR	Oz Peretz (to (Israel) Hapoel Ramat Gan)

== See also ==
- List of Maccabi Petah Tikva F.C. seasons
