= Javier Cuéllar =

Javier Cuéllar may refer to:

- Carlos Javier Cuéllar (born 1981), Spanish professional footballer
- Javier Cuéllar Valenzuela (fl. 1930s), Chilean politician
- Javier Pérez de Cuéllar (1920–2020), Peruvian diplomat, fifth secretary-general of the United Nations
