= Carlos Cuéllar =

Spanish footballer (born 1981)

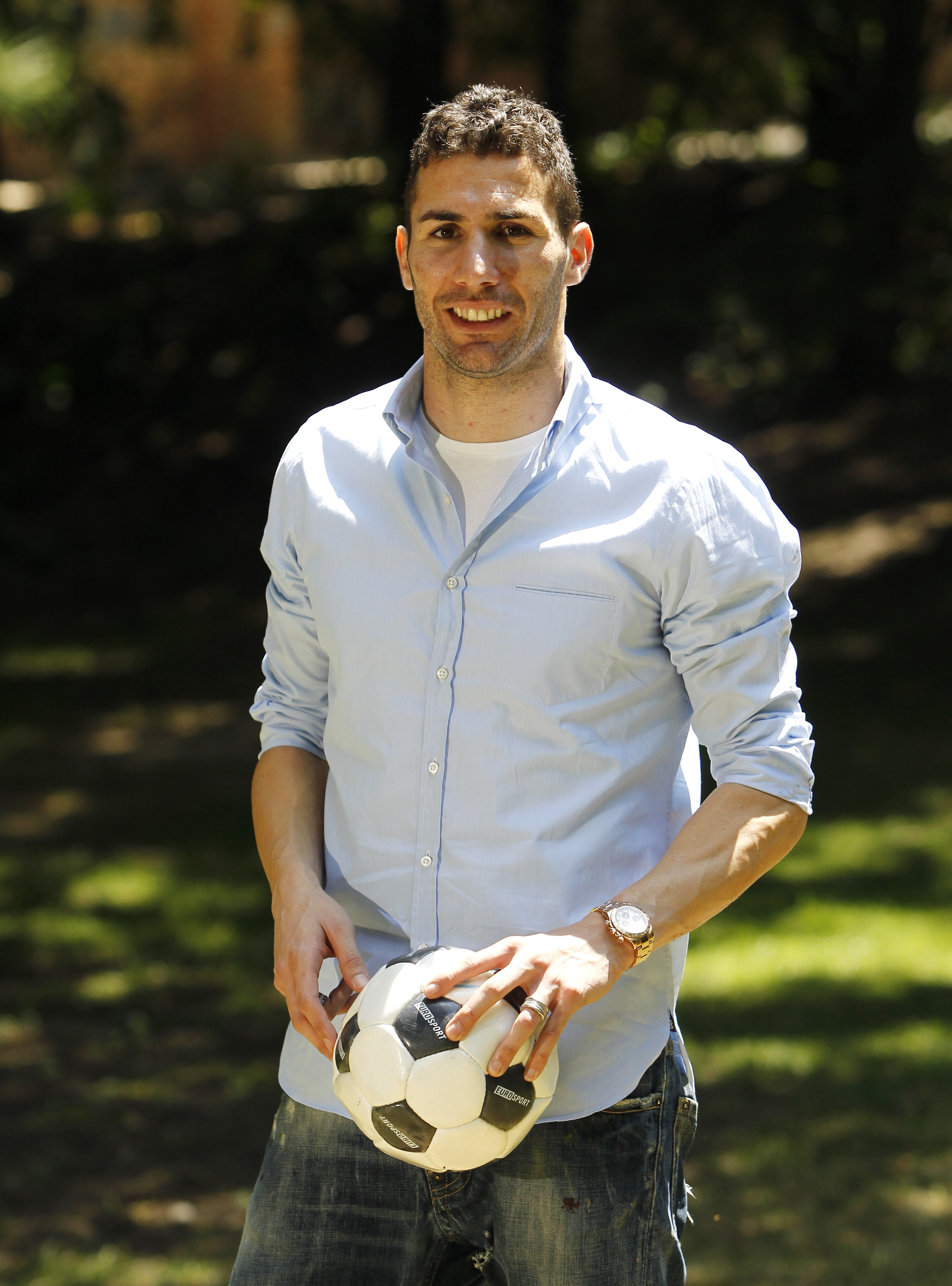
- Cuéllar in 2012

Personal information
- Full name: Carlos Javier Cuéllar Jiménez
- Date of birth: 23 August 1981 (age 45)
- Place of birth: Madrid, Spain
- Height: 1.90 m (6 ft 3 in)
- Position: Centre-back

Team information
- Current team: Elche B (manager)

Youth career
- Inter Argibay
- Santa Ana
- Pegaso
- → San Federico (loan)

Senior career*
| Years | Team | Apps | (Gls) |
| 2000–2003 | Numancia | 62 | (4) |
| 2000–2001 | → Calahorra (loan) | 27 | (1) |
| 2003–2007 | Osasuna | 71 | (2) |
| 2007–2008 | Rangers | 36 | (4) |
| 2008–2012 | Aston Villa | 94 | (2) |
| 2012–2014 | Sunderland | 30 | (1) |
| 2014–2015 | Norwich City | 8 | (0) |
| 2015–2016 | Almería | 18 | (0) |
| 2016–2017 | Maccabi Petah Tikva | 30 | (0) |
| 2017–2018 | Ironi Kiryat Shmona | 31 | (1) |
| 2018 | Beitar Jerusalem | 0 | (0) |
| 2018–2019 | Bnei Yehuda | 23 | (1) |
| Total | | 430 | (16) |

Managerial career
- 2022: SS Reyes (youth)
- 2022–2023: SS Reyes B
- 2023–2025: Murcia B
- 2025–: Elche B
- * Club domestic league appearances and goals

Carlos Javier Cuéllar Jiménez (Spanish pronunciation: [ˈkaɾlos ˈkweʎaɾ]; born 23 August 1981) is a Spanish former professional footballer, and the current manager of Elche Ilicitano. Mainly a central defender, he could also operate as a right-back.

== Career ==
=== Early career ===
Born in Madrid, Cuéllar represented Internacional de Argibay, Santa Ana, Pegaso and San Federico as a youth. In 2000, after a short trial at Atlético Madrid, he was signed by Numancia, being immediately loaned to Calahorra in the Segunda División B.

Cuéllar returned to the Soria after his loan expired, and made his professional debut on 23 September 2001, starting and being booked in a 1–2 away loss against Xerez in the Segunda División championship. He scored his first professional goal on 12 May of the following year, netting the last in a 4–0 home routing of Racing Ferrol.

=== Osasuna ===
On 29 August 2003 Cuéllar signed a three-year deal with Osasuna in La Liga. He made his debut in the competition on 19 October, playing the full 90 minutes in a 2–1 home win against Real Murcia.

Cuéllar spent his first two seasons as a backup to César Cruchaga and Josetxo, but still renewed his contract with the club on 1 December 2005. He became an important part of the Javier Aguirre side that reached the Copa del Rey final in 2005 and finished fourth in the league in the following season, thus qualifying for the UEFA Champions League.

As Osasuna "dropped" to the UEFA Cup Cuéllar, by then not an automatic first-choice in the league, played seven times in European competition, as the Navarrese reached the semifinals. He scored twice, notably in the 3–0 win at the BayArena against Bayer Leverkusen in April 2007, which was the fastest goal of the tournament that season.

=== Rangers ===
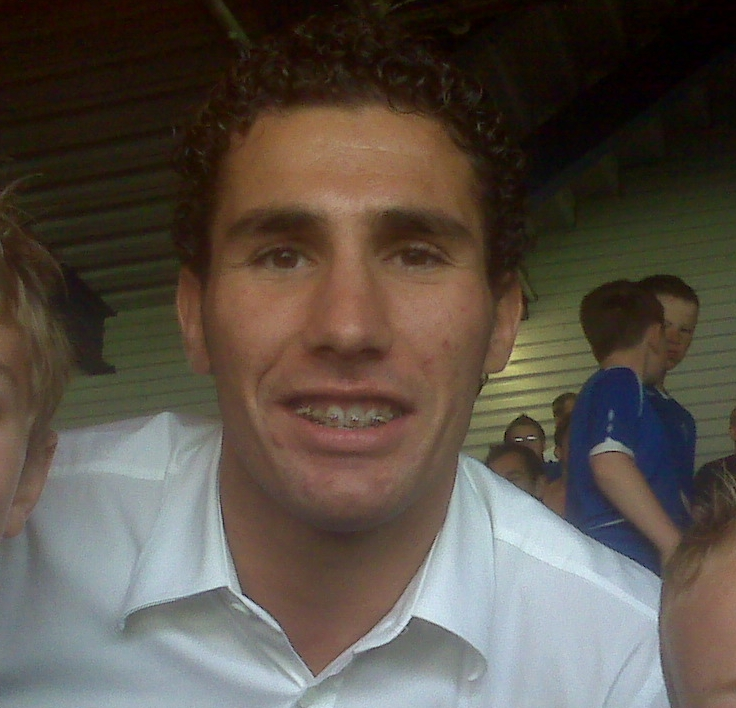
Carlos Cuéllar with a fan during his time at Rangers.

Scottish club Rangers made two offers for Cuéllar in June 2007 that were rejected by Osasuna, but the eventual transfer was completed on 5 July, for a fee of £2.37 million. He signed a four-year contract, worth a reported £15,000 per week, and made his competitive Rangers debut against Zeta on 31 July 2007, in a 2–0 victory. After impressing early in the season, Cuéllar was awarded the Scottish Premier League Player of the Month award for August 2007. He scored his first Rangers goal on 1 September 2007, during a 4–0 victory over Gretna.

Cuéllar continued to play well for Rangers, but he was sent off during a critical Old Firm match for handling a goal-bound Shunsuke Nakamura shot. The resultant penalty kick was saved by Allan McGregor, but Celtic went on to win the match and the league title. As personal reward for what was an outstanding season, Cuéllar collected the Scottish Premier League Player of the Year award and was named the Scottish Football Writers Associations Player of the Year. At the event, he was quoted as saying "I want to stay at Rangers for life." Following the departure of Thomas Buffel during the summer, Cuéllar was handed the number 4 shirt for the 2008–09 season, but never wore it as he was injured for the first game against Falkirk and transferred to Aston Villa just days later. He made a total of 65 appearances for Rangers, a club record for a single season, and scored 5 goals.

=== Aston Villa ===
On 12 August 2008, English Premier League side Aston Villa signed Cuéllar in a deal worth £7.8 million on a four-year contract. Villa's offer had triggered a release-clause in Cuéllar's Rangers contract. He was given the squad number 24, which he also wore at his previous club. His move to Aston Villa 'surprised' and 'disappointed' manager Walter Smith.

Cuéllar made his official first team début on 18 September in the 3–1 UEFA Cup first round victory against Litex Lovech in Bulgaria. He made his first league appearance for Aston Villa in the West Midlands Derby match against West Bromwich Albion on 21 September. Cuéllar came on as a late substitute in a match which Aston Villa won 2–1. His first league start came against Portsmouth on 19 October 2008, where he however operated as a right-back. Most of Cuéllar's league appearances during his first season were in that position, due to the good form in the central partnership of Curtis Davies and Martin Laursen.

Cuéllar performed for Villa at the 2009 Peace Cup in his homeland. He went on to score the winning penalty in the final where Juventus went down 4–3 in a shootout to Villa.

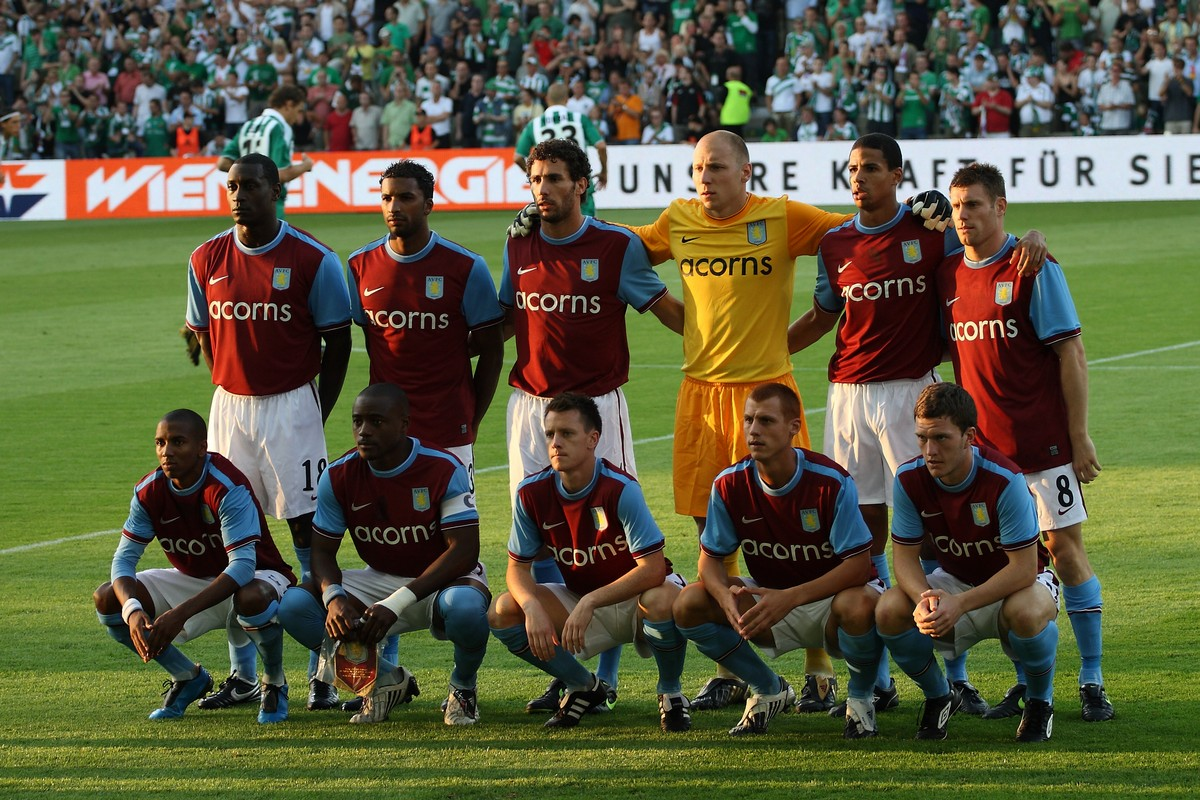
Cuéllar (back, third from left) in the Villa starting eleven in 2009.

He scored his first goal for Villa against Bolton Wanderers on 7 November 2009 at Villa Park. His second goal for the Villa came against Manchester United on 10 February 2010, opening the scoring with a header which was 1–1. In the third round of a FA Cup, Cuéllar scored a header in a 3–1 win over Blackburn Rovers on 2 January 2010.

Aston Villa accepted an offer from Cuéllar's old club Rangers in the summer of 2011 but the player was injured and the move broke down. In February 2012, Cuéllar announced that he would be willing to play anywhere on the pitch if it was good for the team. He then started against Manchester City at left back ahead of Stephen Warnock in a Premier League match.

On 6 May 2012, following a 1–1 draw with Tottenham Hotspur that confirmed Aston Villa's Premier League survival, Cuéllar announced via his official Twitter and Facebook pages that he would leave the club at the end of his contract in the summer of 2012. Cuéllar called his final home game "one of the saddest days". After his release, Cuéllar said he was keen to stay at England despite an option to move back to Spain.

=== Sunderland ===
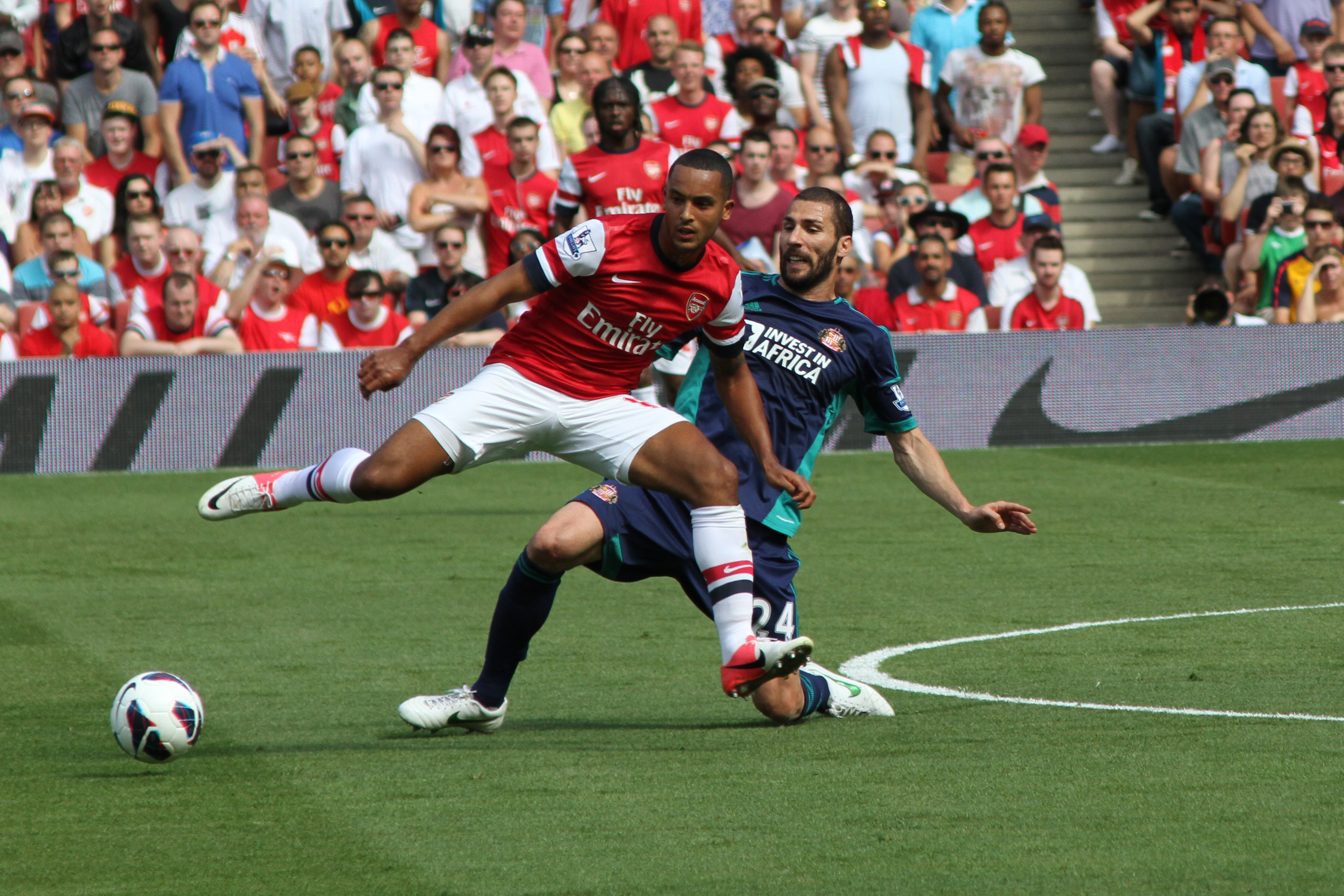
Cuéllar tackling Arsenal's Theo Walcott on his Sunderland debut

On 2 July 2012, Sunderland confirmed the free signing of Carlos Cuéllar on a two-year contract following his departure from Aston Villa, signed by his former Villa manager Martin O'Neill. He made his debut on 18 August in a goalless draw against Arsenal and scored his first goal for the club on 18 November in a 3–1 victory at Fulham.

At the end of the 2013–14 season, he was released by the club.

=== Norwich City ===
Cuéllar signed a one-year deal with Championship side Norwich City on 20 August 2014. He made his debut six days later in Norwich's League Cup match against Crawley Town. Cuéllar conceded an own goal in the 55th minute, but Norwich won the match 3–1. Cuéllar was released by Norwich a few days after the club secured promotion back to the Premier League, having made 10 appearances for the Canaries.

=== Almería ===
On 10 August 2015, Cuéllar signed a one-year deal with Almería in the second level, mainly as a replacement to Levante-bound Ángel Trujillo.

=== Maccabi Petah Tikva ===
On 12 August 2016, Cuéllar signed a short-term deal with Maccabi Petah Tikva for an undisclosed fee.

=== Ironi Kiryat Shmona ===
On 22 May 2017, Cuéllar signed a one-year deal with Ironi Kiryat Shmona.

=== Beitar Jerusalem ===
On 15 May 2018, Cuéllar joined Beitar Jerusalem, with his teammate Itamar Nitzan. He was released from the team on 16 August 2018.

=== Bnei Yehuda ===
On 7 September 2018, Cuéllar signed with Bnei Yehuda. He left the club in the summer 2019 and announced his retirement on 17 October 2019.

== Personal life ==
In December 2015, Cuéllar became a vegan for health reasons. He made this decision after watching the documentary Forks Over Knives.

== Career statistics ==
Appearances and goals by club, season and competition
| Club | Season | League | | | National cup | | League cup | | Europe | | Other | | Total | |
| Club | Season | Division | Apps | Goals | Apps | Goals | Apps | Goals | Apps | Goals | Apps | Goals | Apps | Goals |
|---|---|---|---|---|---|---|---|---|---|---|---|---|---|---|
| Calahorra | 2000–01 | Segunda División B | 27 | 1 | 0 | 0 | — | | — | | 6 (Note: Appearances in Segunda División B play-offs) | 0 | 33 | 1 |
| Numancia | 2001–02 | Segunda División | 23 | 1 | 1 | 0 | — | | — | | — | | 24 | 1 |
| Numancia | 2002–03 | Segunda División | 39 | 3 | 3 | 0 | — | | — | | — | | 42 | 3 |
| Numancia | Total | | 62 | 4 | 4 | 0 | 0 | 0 | 0 | 0 | 0 | 0 | 66 | 4 |
| Osasuna | 2003–04 | La Liga | 5 | 0 | 3 | 0 | — | | — | | — | | 8 | 0 |
| Osasuna | 2004–05 | La Liga | 14 | 0 | 7 | 1 | — | | — | | — | | 21 | 1 |
| Osasuna | 2005–06 | La Liga | 29 | 1 | 0 | 0 | — | | 2 (Note: Appearances in UEFA Cup) | 0 | — | | 31 | 1 |
| Osasuna | 2006–07 | La Liga | 23 | 1 | 3 | 0 | — | | 9 (Note: Two appearances and one goal in UEFA Champions League, seven appearances and one goal in UEFA Cup) | 2 | — | | 35 | 3 |
| Osasuna | Total | | 71 | 2 | 13 | 1 | 0 | 0 | 11 | 2 | 0 | 0 | 95 | 5 |
| Rangers | 2007–08 | Scottish Premier League | 36 | 4 | 6 | 0 | 4 | 1 | 19 (Note: 10 appearances in UEFA Champions League, 9 in UEFA Cup) | 0 | — | | 65 | 5 |
| Rangers | 2008–09 | Scottish Premier League | 0 | 0 | 0 | 0 | 0 | 0 | 0 | 0 | — | | 0 | 0 |
| Aston Villa | 2008–09 | Premier League | 28 | 0 | 2 | 0 | 1 | 0 | 6 | 0 | — | | 37 | 0 |
| Aston Villa | 2009–10 | Premier League | 36 | 2 | 4 | 1 | 6 | 0 | 2 (Note: Appearances in UEFA Europa League) | 0 | — | | 48 | 3 |
| Aston Villa | 2010–11 | Premier League | 12 | 0 | 2 | 0 | 2 | 0 | 0 | 0 | — | | 16 | 0 |
| Aston Villa | 2011–12 | Premier League | 18 | 0 | 1 | 0 | 0 | 0 | — | | — | | 19 | 0 |
| Aston Villa | Total | | 94 | 2 | 9 | 1 | 9 | 0 | 8 | 0 | 0 | 0 | 120 | 3 |
| Sunderland | 2012–13 | Premier League | 26 | 1 | 1 | 0 | 1 | 0 | — | | — | | 28 | 1 |
| Sunderland | 2013–14 | Premier League | 4 | 0 | 0 | 0 | 1 | 0 | — | | — | | 5 | 0 |
| Sunderland | Total | | 30 | 1 | 1 | 0 | 2 | 0 | 0 | 0 | 0 | 0 | 33 | 1 |
| Norwich City | 2014–15 | Championship | 8 | 0 | 0 | 0 | 2 | 0 | — | | — | | 10 | 0 |
| Almería | 2015–16 | Segunda División | 18 | 0 | 2 | 0 | — | | — | | — | | 20 | 0 |
| Maccabi Petah Tikva | 2016–17 | Israeli League | 30 | 0 | 2 | 0 | — | | — | | — | | 32 | 0 |
| Ironi Kiryat Shmona | 2017–18 | Israeli League | 31 | 1 | 5 | 0 | 5 | 1 | — | | — | | 41 | 2 |
| Beitar Jerusalem | 2018–19 | Israeli League | 0 | 0 | 0 | 0 | — | | 2 | 0 | — | | 2 | 0 |
| Bnei Yehuda | 2018–19 | Israeli League | 23 | 1 | 3 | 0 | — | | — | | — | | 26 | 1 |
| Career total | | | 430 | 16 | 45 | 2 | 22 | 2 | 40 | 2 | 6 | 0 | 543 | 22 |

== Honours ==
Osasuna

- Copa del Rey runner-up: 2004–05

Rangers

- Scottish Cup: 2007–08
- Scottish League Cup: 2007–08
- UEFA Cup runner-up: 2007–08

Aston Villa

- Football League Cup runner-up: 2009–10

Bnei Yehuda

- Israel State Cup: 2018–19

Individual

- Scottish Premier League Player of the Year: 2007–08
- SFWA Footballer of the Year: 2007–08
