= Hen Ezra =

Israeli footballer

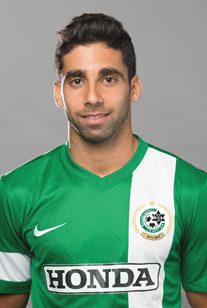
- Ezra with Maccabi Haifa in 2013

Personal information
- Full name: Hen Ezra
- Date of birth: 19 January 1989 (age 37)
- Place of birth: Be'er Sheva, Israel
- Height: 1.74 m (5 ft 8 1/2 in)
- Position: Attacking midfielder

Youth career
- Hapoel Be'er Sheva
- Beitar Tubruk
- 2007–2008: Maccabi Netanya

Senior career*
Years	Team	Apps	(Gls)
2007–2012	Maccabi Netanya	79	(16)
2008–2009	→ Hapoel Kfar Saba (loan)	29	(4)
2012–2016	Maccabi Haifa	122	(26)
2016–2017	Hapoel Tel Aviv	13	(2)
2017–2018	Beitar Jerusalem	46	(10)
2018–2019	Hapoel Be'er Sheva	14	(0)
2019–2020	Omonia	8	(0)
2020–2022	Maccabi Netanya	64	(7)

International career
2006	Israel U17	3	(1)
2007	Israel U18	2	(0)
2007–2008	Israel U19	9	(0)
2012–2014	Israel	9	(1)
- * Club domestic league appearances and goals as of 1 June 2022

Hen Ezra (Hebrew: חן עזרא; born 19 January 1989) is an Israeli footballer who plays as an attacking midfielder for Maccabi Netanya.

== Career ==
Ezra played in the youth teams of Hapoel Be'er Sheva and Beitar Tubruk. In 2007, he moved to Maccabi Netanya, and the following season was loaned to Hapoel Kfar Saba to gain experience in that season he finished with 4 goals and 3 assists in summer 2009 he returned to Maccabi Netanya.

=== Breakthrough season: 2011–12 ===
In summer 2011 Ezra was closed in Maccabi Haifa, but eventually stayed in Netanya. under the guidance of Reuven Atar Ezra excelled in all games playing in the left winger position He scored his first goal of the new season in a 6–2 win against Hapoel Rishon LeZion in which he added another goal and had a terrific match Ezra then continued his fine season by scoring another 10 goals and assists 3 Ezra was heavily praised by the Israeli media this season.

=== Maccabi Haifa ===
In June 2012 he moved to Maccabi Haifa for a fee of $1,000,000 and a four years contract worth approximately $700,000 In 2012/2013 season he played for Maccabi Haifa Ezra excelled under the guidance of coach Arik Benado (that replaced Reuven Atar) finishing the season with 9 goals and 14 assists and was selected "Team of the season" of Ma'ariv.

=== International ===
He has played for the Israel national side at U17, U18, U19, and senior level, and was a part of the U21 squad (although he never won a cap). On 7 September 2012 Ezra made his debut on the national team, when he played in the game against Azerbaijan in 2014 FIFA World Cup qualifiers. On 2 June 2013 he scored his debut goal, in a friendly match against Honduras.

== Club career statistics ==
(correct As of 1 June 2022)

Club	Season	League		Cup		Toto Cup		Europe		Total	
Club	Season	Apps	Goals	Apps	Goals	Apps	Goals	Apps	Goals	Apps	Goals
Maccabi Netanya	2007–08	4	0	0	0	3	0	0	0	7	0
Hapoel Kfar Saba (loan)	2008–09	29	4	3	0	2	0	0	0	34	4
Maccabi Netanya	2009–10	10	1	0	0	5	1	3	1	18	3
Maccabi Netanya	2010–11	28	3	3	0	4	0	0	0	35	3
Maccabi Netanya	2011–12	37	12	3	1	2	0	0	0	42	13
Maccabi Haifa	2012–13	36	9	4	0	4	0	0	0	44	9
Maccabi Haifa	2013–14	24	5	1	0	0	0	10	3	35	8
Maccabi Haifa	2014–15	36	8	2	1	8	1	0	0	46	10
Maccabi Haifa	2015–16	26	4	5	1	5	1	0	0	36	6
Hapoel Tel Aviv	2016–17	13	2	0	0	3	1	0	0	16	3
Beitar Jerusalem	2016–17	15	2	4	1	0	0	0	0	19	3
Beitar Jerusalem	2017–18	31	8	4	0	3	0	4	2	42	10
Hapoel Be'er Sheva	2018–19	14	0	0	0	2	0	6	2	22	2
AC Omonia	2019–20	8	0	2	1	0	0	0	0	10	1
Maccabi Netanya	2019–20	12	2	0	0	0	0	0	0	12	2
Maccabi Netanya	2020–21	28	5	2	0	4	1	0	0	34	6
Maccabi Netanya	2021–22	24	0	2	0	4	0	0	0	30	0
Total Career		375	65	35	5	49	5	23	8	482	83

== Honours ==
=== Club ===
Maccabi Haifa

- Israeli Premier League Runner-up (1): 2012–13
- Israel State Cup (1): 2015–16

=== Individual ===
- Israeli Premier League – 2012–13 Most assists (13)

== International goals ==
Scores and results list Israel's goal tally first.

Goal	Date	Venue	Opponent	Score	Result	Competition
1.	2 June 2013	Citi Field, New York City, USA	Honduras	1–0	2–0	Friendly
