= Idan Vered =

Israeli footballer

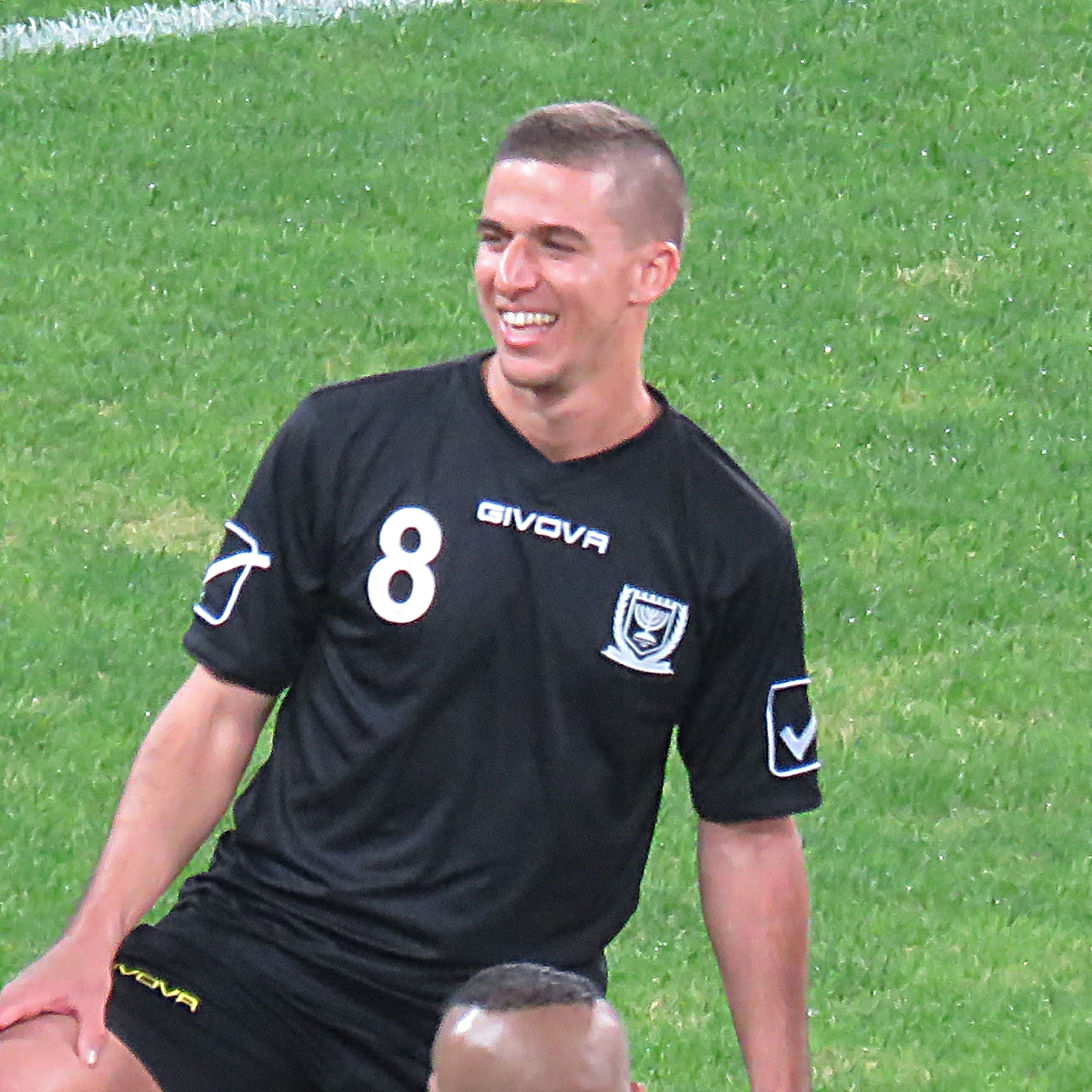
- Vered in 2016

Personal information
- Full name: Idan Vered
- Date of birth: 25 May 1989 (age 37)
- Place of birth: Ramat Gan, Israel
- Height: 1.76 m (5 ft 9 in)
- Position: Right wing

Team information
- Current team: Maccabi Petah Tikva
- Number: 15

Youth career
- 2002–2006: Hakoah Amidar Ramat Gan
- 2007–2008: Beitar Jerusalem

Senior career*
Years	Team	Apps	(Gls)
2006–2007	Hakoah Amidar Ramat Gan	2	(1)
2007–2010	Beitar Jerusalem	45	(6)
2010–2015	Maccabi Haifa	130	(14)
2015–2016	Red Star Belgrade	8	(1)
2016	Ottawa Fury	10	(1)
2016–2021	Beitar Jerusalem	128	(27)
2021–2023	Hapoel Tel Aviv	38	(1)
2023–2024	Hapoel Petah Tikva	40	(3)
2024–	Maccabi Petah Tikva	37	(1)

International career
2007–2010	Israel U21	8	(2)
2017	Israel	2	(0)
- * Club domestic league appearances and goals as of 24 June 2026

Idan Vered (Hebrew: עידן ורד; born 25 May 1989) is an Israeli professional footballer who plays as a winger for Maccabi Petah Tikva.

== Early life ==
Vered was born and raised in Ramat Gan, Israel, to an Israeli family of Jewish descent.

== Club career ==
Vered played entire career in Israel with Hakoah Amidar Ramat Gan, Beitar Jerusalem and Maccabi Haifa before coming to the Serbian SuperLiga club Red Star Belgrade in June 2015.

In June 2021, Vered joined Beitar Jerusalem's rivals Hapoel Tel Aviv.

== International career ==
Vered got his first call up to the senior Israel national team for a 2018 FIFA World Cup qualifier against Macedonia in October 2016.

== Career statistics ==
As of 1 June 2024

Appearances and goals by club, season and competition
Club	Season	League		Cup		League Cup		Continental		Total	
Club	Season	Apps	Goals	Apps	Goals	Apps	Goals	Apps	Goals	Apps	Goals
Beitar Jerusalem	2007–08	1	0	0	0	0	0	0	0	1	0
Beitar Jerusalem	2008–09	21	3	0	0	3	0	0	0	24	3
Beitar Jerusalem	2009–10	21	2	1	0	8	1	0	0	30	3
Beitar Jerusalem	Total	43	5	1	0	11	1	0	0	55	6
Maccabi Haifa	2010–11	28	3	3	0	4	0	0	0	35	3
Maccabi Haifa	2011–12	31	3	4	0	3	0	12	3	50	6
Maccabi Haifa	2012–13	17	1	0	0	4	1	0	0	21	2
Maccabi Haifa	2013–14	24	2	1	0	0	0	5	0	30	2
Maccabi Haifa	2014–15	28	6	2	0	7	2	0	0	37	8
Maccabi Haifa	Total	128	15	10	0	18	3	17	3	173	21
Red Star Belgrade	2015–16	8	1	0	0	0	0	2	0	10	1
Ottawa Fury	2016	10	1	3	1	0	0	0	0	13	2
Beitar Jerusalem	2016–17	34	11	5	0	2	0	6	2	47	13
Beitar Jerusalem	2017–18	21	6	3	0	2	0	4	1	30	7
Beitar Jerusalem	2018–19	27	5	1	0	1	0	2	1	31	6
Beitar Jerusalem	2019–20	16	3	1	0	0	0	0	0	17	3
Beitar Jerusalem	2020–21	30	2	2	0	4	0	1	0	37	2
Beitar Jerusalem	Total	128	27	12	0	9	0	13	4	162	31
Hapoel Tel Aviv	2021–22	30	1	0	0	4	0	0	0	34	1
Hapoel Tel Aviv	2022–23	8	0	0	0	1	0	0	0	9	0
Hapoel Tel Aviv	Total	38	1	0	0	5	0	0	0	43	1
Hapoel Petah Tikva	2022–23	12	1	1	1	0	0	0	0	13	2
Hapoel Petah Tikva	2023–24	28	2	3	1	5	0	0	0	36	2
Hapoel Petah Tikva	Total	40	3	4	2	5	0	0	0	49	4
Maccabi Petah Tikva	2024–25	0	0	0	0	0	0	0	0	0	0
Maccabi Petah Tikva	Total	0	0	0	0	0	0	0	0	0	0
Career total		387	53	30	3	47	4	32	7	496	66

== Honours ==
=== Club ===
Beitar Jerusalem

- Israeli Premier League: 2007–08
- Toto Cup Al: 2008, 2009

Maccabi Haifa

- Israeli Premier League: 2010–11

Red Star Belgrade

- Serbian SuperLiga: 2015–16

== See also ==
- List of Jewish footballers
- List of Jews in sports
- List of Israelis
