= Orel Dgani =

Israeli footballer

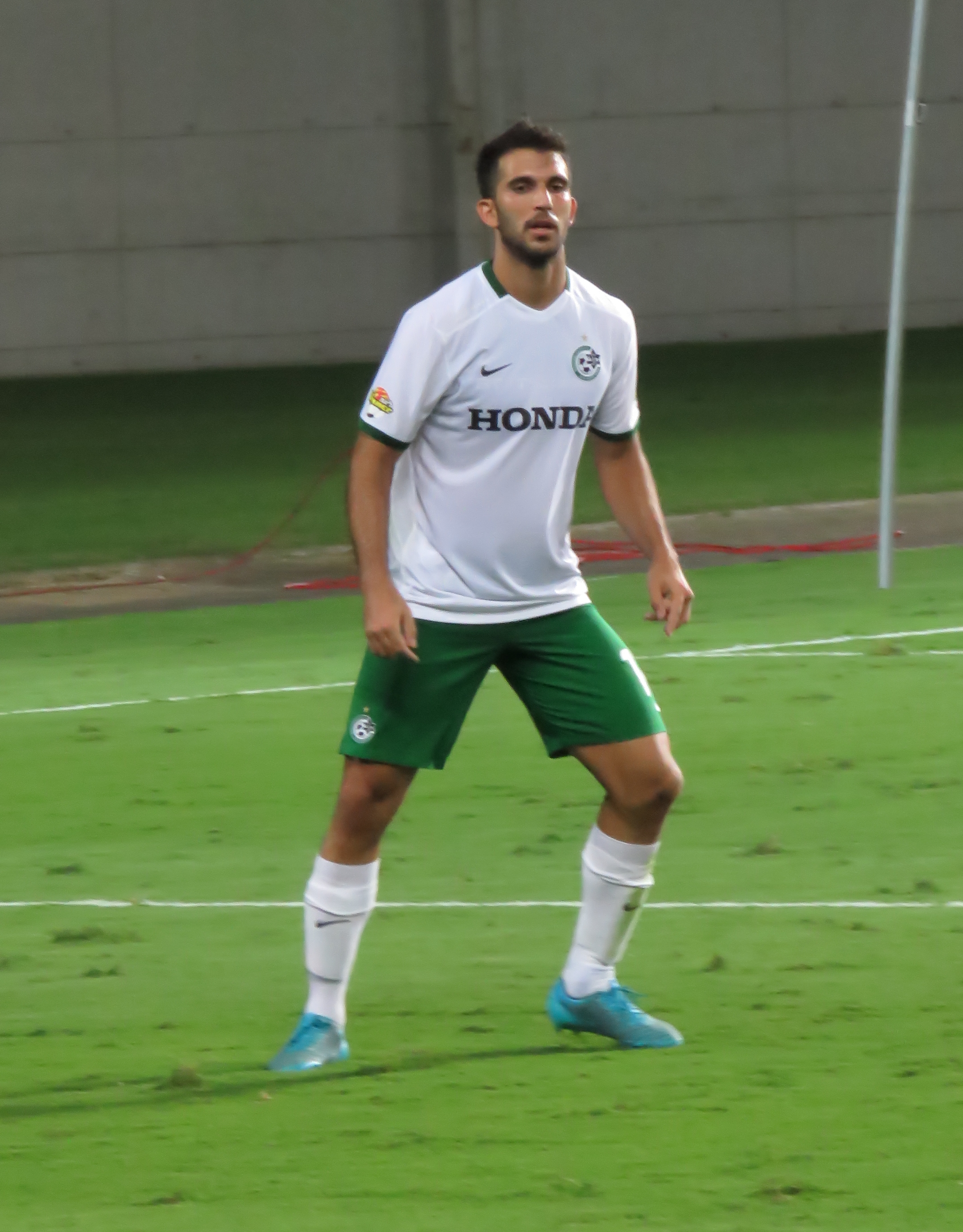
- Dgani playing for Maccabi Haifa in 2015

Personal information
- Date of birth: 8 January 1989 (age 37)
- Place of birth: Pardes Hanna-Karkur, Israel
- Height: 1.81 m (5 ft 11 in)
- Position: Center-back

Team information
- Current team: Hapoel Petah Tikva

Youth career
- Maccabi Netanya

Senior career*
Years	Team	Apps	(Gls)
2008–2011	Maccabi Netanya	74	(3)
2011–2016	Maccabi Haifa	85	(0)
2013–2014	→ Hapoel Tel Aviv (loan)	32	(1)
2016–2020	Hapoel Tel Aviv	112	(4)
2020–2024	Beitar Jerusalem	91	(1)
2024–2025	Hapoel Haifa	23	(0)
2025–	Hapoel Petah Tikva	28	(0)

International career^{‡}
2008–2011	Israel U21	7	(0)
2010–2022	Israel	21	(0)
- * Club domestic league appearances and goals as of 23 June 2026 ‡ National team caps and goals as of 30 March 2022

Orel Dgani (Hebrew: אוראל דגני; born 8 January 1989) is an Israeli professional footballer who plays as a center-back for Israeli Premier League club Hapoel Petah Tikva and the Israel national team.

== Early life ==
Dgani was born in Pardes Hanna-Karkur, Israel, to a Moroccan-Jewish family.

== Career ==
Dgani is a protégé of Maccabi Netanya youth ranks and in 2008 he became a permanent player in the senior team. In 2010, he was appointed as the captain of the team.

On 31 August 2011 he signed a four-year contract with Maccabi Haifa for a fee of $1m.

In the 2013–14 season he was on loan at Hapoel Tel Aviv.

On 4 August 2020 he signed a three years contract at Beitar Jerusalem.

== Honours ==
=== Club ===
Maccabi Haifa

- Israel State Cup (1): 2015–16

== Club career statistics ==
(correct as of 1 June 2023)

Club	Season	League		Cup		Toto Cup		Europe		Total	
Club	Season	Apps	Goals	Apps	Goals	Apps	Goals	Apps	Goals	Apps	Goals
Maccabi Netanya	2008–09	11	0	0	0	7	1	0	0	18	1
Maccabi Netanya	2009–10	29	1	1	0	5	0	4	0	39	1
Maccabi Netanya	2010–11	32	1	4	0	5	1	0	0	41	2
Maccabi Netanya	2011–12	2	0	0	0	3	1	0	0	5	1
Maccabi Haifa	2011–12	15	0	0	0	0	0	3	0	18	0
Maccabi Haifa	2012–13	14	0	2	0	1	0	0	0	17	0
Hapoel Tel Aviv	2013–14	32	1	1	0	0	0	4	0	37	1
Maccabi Haifa	2014–15	33	0	1	0	3	0	1	0	38	0
Maccabi Haifa	2015–16	23	0	4	0	4	0	0	0	31	0
Hapoel Tel Aviv	2016–17	27	0	2	0	2	0	0	0	31	0
Hapoel Tel Aviv	2017–18	31	3	1	0	4	0	0	0	36	3
Hapoel Tel Aviv	2018–19	27	0	2	0	1	0	0	0	30	0
Hapoel Tel Aviv	2019–20	27	1	4	0	3	0	0	0	34	1
Beitar Jerusalem	2020–21	24	0	1	0	3	0	0	0	28	0
Beitar Jerusalem	2021–22	23	0	0	0	5	0	0	0	28	0
Beitar Jerusalem	2022–23	26	1	2	0	6	0	0	0	34	1
Career		376	8	25	0	52	3	12	0	465	11
