= Romário Pires =

Brazilian footballer (born 1989)

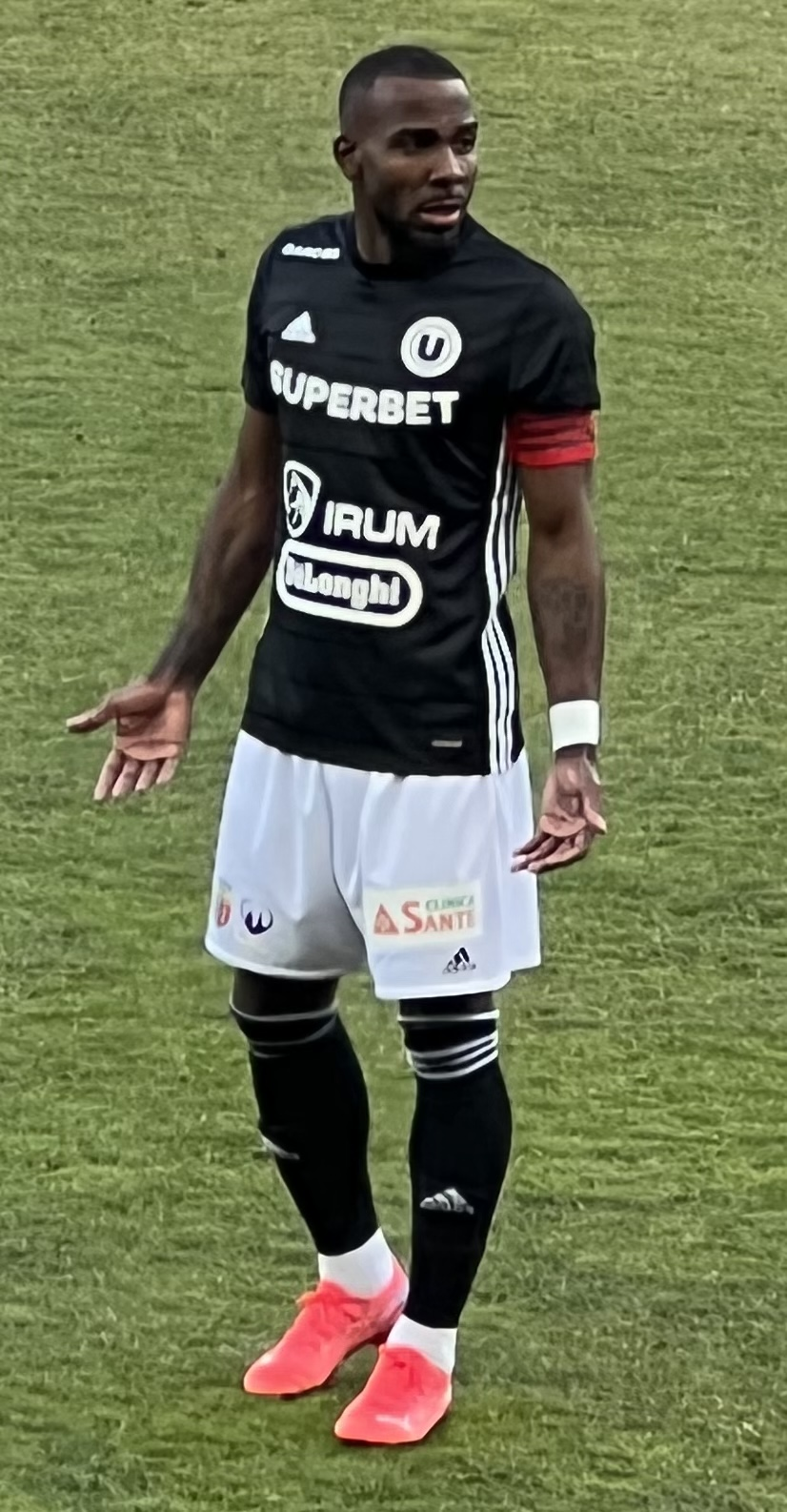
- Pires with Universitatea Cluj in 2022

Personal information
- Full name: Romário Santos Pires
- Date of birth: 16 January 1989 (age 37)
- Place of birth: Rio de Janeiro, Brazil
- Height: 1.81 m (5 ft 11 in)
- Position: Midfielder

Team information
- Current team: Păulești
- Number: 52

Youth career
- –2008: Botafogo

Senior career*
Years	Team	Apps	(Gls)
2010	Botafogo	0	(0)
2008	→ Boavista SC (loan)		
2009	→ Botafogo da Paraíba (loan)		
2010	→ Olaira (loan)	14	(0)
2010–2012	Duque de Caxias	11	(0)
2010	→ Marcílio Dias (loan)	2	(0)
2011	→ Macaé (loan)	13	(0)
2012	Gloria Bistrița	18	(0)
2013–2015	Petrolul Ploiești	20	(1)
2014–2015	→ Maccabi Netanya (loan)	27	(1)
2015–2016	Maccabi Netanya	20	(2)
2016	Maccabi Haifa	13	(0)
2016–2018	Maccabi Petah Tikva	80	(4)
2019	Astra Giurgiu	11	(0)
2019–2021	Hermannstadt	61	(7)
2021–2022	Farul Constanța	15	(0)
2022–2023	Universitatea Cluj	36	(2)
2023–2024	Concordia Chiajna	6	(0)
2024	Telejenul Văleni	3	(3)
2024–	Păulești	48	(7)
- * Club domestic league appearances and goals as of 13:06, 27 December 2024 (UTC)

Romário Santos Pires (born 16 January 1989) is a Brazilian professional footballer who plays as a midfielder for Liga III side CS Păulești.

After starting out with several teams in his native Brazil, he went on to compete professionally in Romania and Israel.

== Personal life ==
Pires is named after the former Brazilian international Romário, of which his father was a fan. He married a Romanian handballer in 2020, with the couple having one daughter.

== Career statistics ==
=== Club ===
As of match played 14 September 2023

Appearances and goals by club, season and competition
Club	Season	League			National Cup		League Cup		Other		Total	
Club	Season	Division	Apps	Goals	Apps	Goals	Apps	Goals	Apps	Goals	Apps	Goals
Gloria Bistrița	2012–13	Liga I	18	0	0	0	—		—		18	0
Petrolul Ploiești	2012–13	Liga I	3	0	2	0	—		—		5	0
Petrolul Ploiești	2013–14	Liga I	17	1	4	2	—		4 (Note: One appearance in the Supercupa României, three appearances in UEFA Europa League)	0	25	3
Petrolul Ploiești	Total		20	1	6	2	—		4	0	30	3
Maccabi Netanya (loan)	2014–15	Israeli Premier League	27	1	1	0	—		—		28	1
Maccabi Netanya	2015–16	Israeli Premier League	20	2	1	0	4	0	—		25	2
Maccabi Haifa	2015–16	Israeli Premier League	13	0	3	0	0	0	0	0	16	0
Maccabi Petah Tikva	2016–17	Israeli Premier League	33	1	4	0	4	0	—		41	1
Maccabi Petah Tikva	2017–18	Israeli Premier League	30	3	1	0	5	0	—		36	3
Maccabi Petah Tikva	2018–19	Israeli Premier League	18	0	1	0	0	0	—		19	0
Maccabi Petah Tikva	Total		81	4	6	0	9	0	0	0	96	4
Astra Giurgiu	2018–19	Liga I	11	0	3	0	—		—		14	0
Hermannstadt	2019–20	Liga I	30	3	1	0	—		—		31	3
Hermannstadt	2020–21	Liga I	31	4	1	0	—		1 (Note: Appearance(s) in Liga I relegation play-offs)	0	33	4
Hermannstadt	Total		61	7	2	0	—		1	0	64	7
Farul Constanța	2021–22	Liga I	15	0	1	0	—		—		16	0
Universitatea Cluj	2021–22	Liga II	12	1	—		—		2	0	14	1
Universitatea Cluj	2022–23	Liga I	24	1	1	0	—		—		25	1
Universitatea Cluj	Total		36	2	1	0	—		2	0	39	2
Concordia Chiajna	2023–24	Liga II	6	0	1	0	—		—		7	0
CSO Valenii de Munte	2023-24	Liga IV Prahova	5	3	0	0	—		—		5	3
Career totals			313	20	25	2	13	0	7	0	358	22

== Honours ==
Petrolul Ploiești

- Cupa României: 2012–13
- Supercupa României runner-up: 2013

Maccabi Haifa

- Israel State Cup: 2015–16

Astra Giurgiu

- Cupa României runner-up: 2018–19

Universitatea Cluj

- Cupa României runner-up: 2022–23

=== CSO Valenii de Munte ===
- Liga IV Prahova runner-up: 2023–24
- Cupa României – Prahova County runner-up: 2023–24
