= Oz Peretz =

Israeli footballer

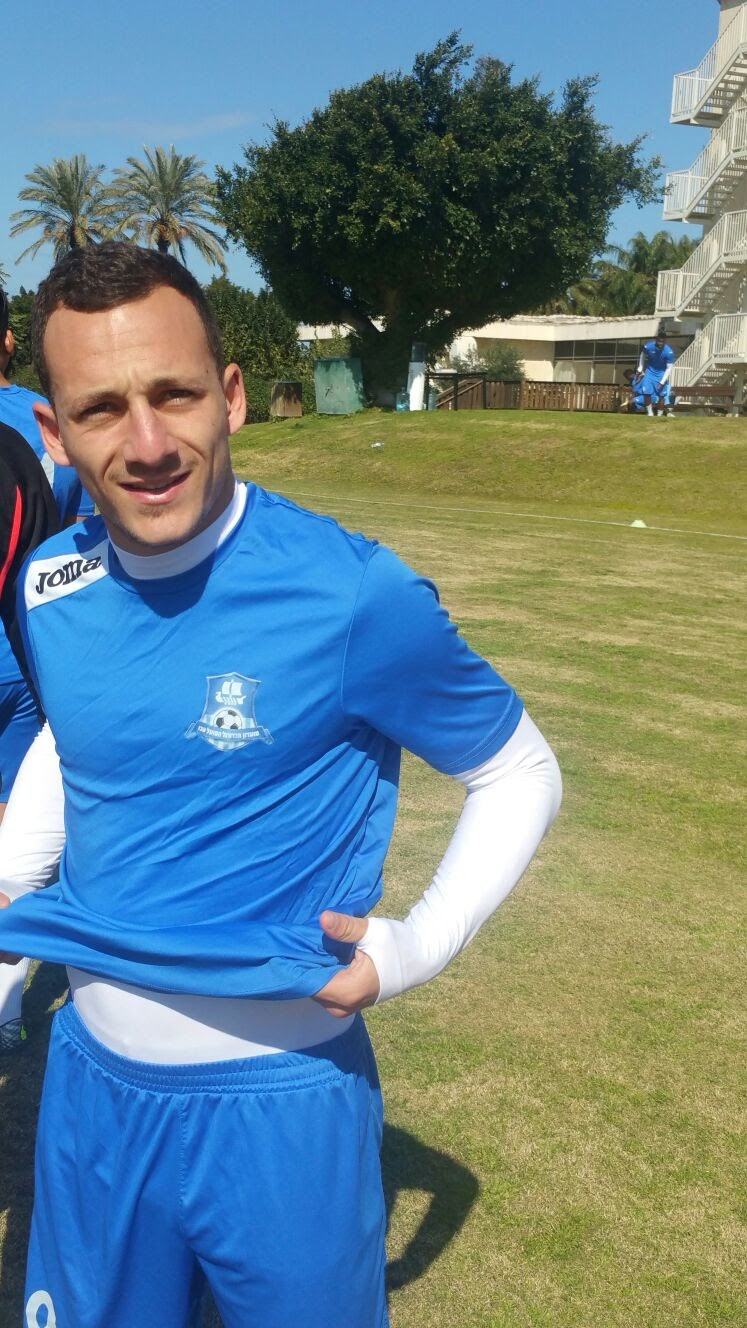
- Peretz with Hapoel Acre in 2016

Personal information
- Full name: Oz Peretz
- Date of birth: April 19, 1994 (age 32)
- Place of birth: Beersheba, Israel
- Position: Forward

Team information
- Current team: Hapoel Migdal HaEmek

Youth career
- 2004–2009: Hapoel Be'er Sheva
- 2009–2014: Maccabi Petah Tikva

Senior career*
Years	Team	Apps	(Gls)
2014–2017	Maccabi Petah Tikva	48	(6)
2016	→ Hapoel Acre (loan)	11	(1)
2017–2018	Hapoel Ramat Gan	30	(6)
2018	Hapoel Kfar Saba	16	(3)
2018–2019	Hapoel Hadera	4	(0)
2019	Hapoel Ashklon	16	(9)
2019–2020	Hapoel Petah Tikva	30	(10)
2020–2021	F.C. Kafr Qasim	31	(3)
2021–2022	Hapoel Ramat HaSharon	15	(1)
2022–2023	Hapoel Petah Tikva	52	(14)
2023–2024	Hapoel Umm al-Fahm	27	(7)
2024–2025	Hapoel Petah Tikva	22	(2)
2025–	Hapoel Migdal HaEmek	0	(0)

International career
2014–2017	Israel U21	2	(0)
- * Club domestic league appearances and goals as of 15 June 2025

Oz Peretz (Hebrew: עוז פרץ; born 19 April 1994) is an Israeli footballer who currently plays for Hapoel Migdal HaEmek.
