= Zahi Gigi =

Israeli footballer

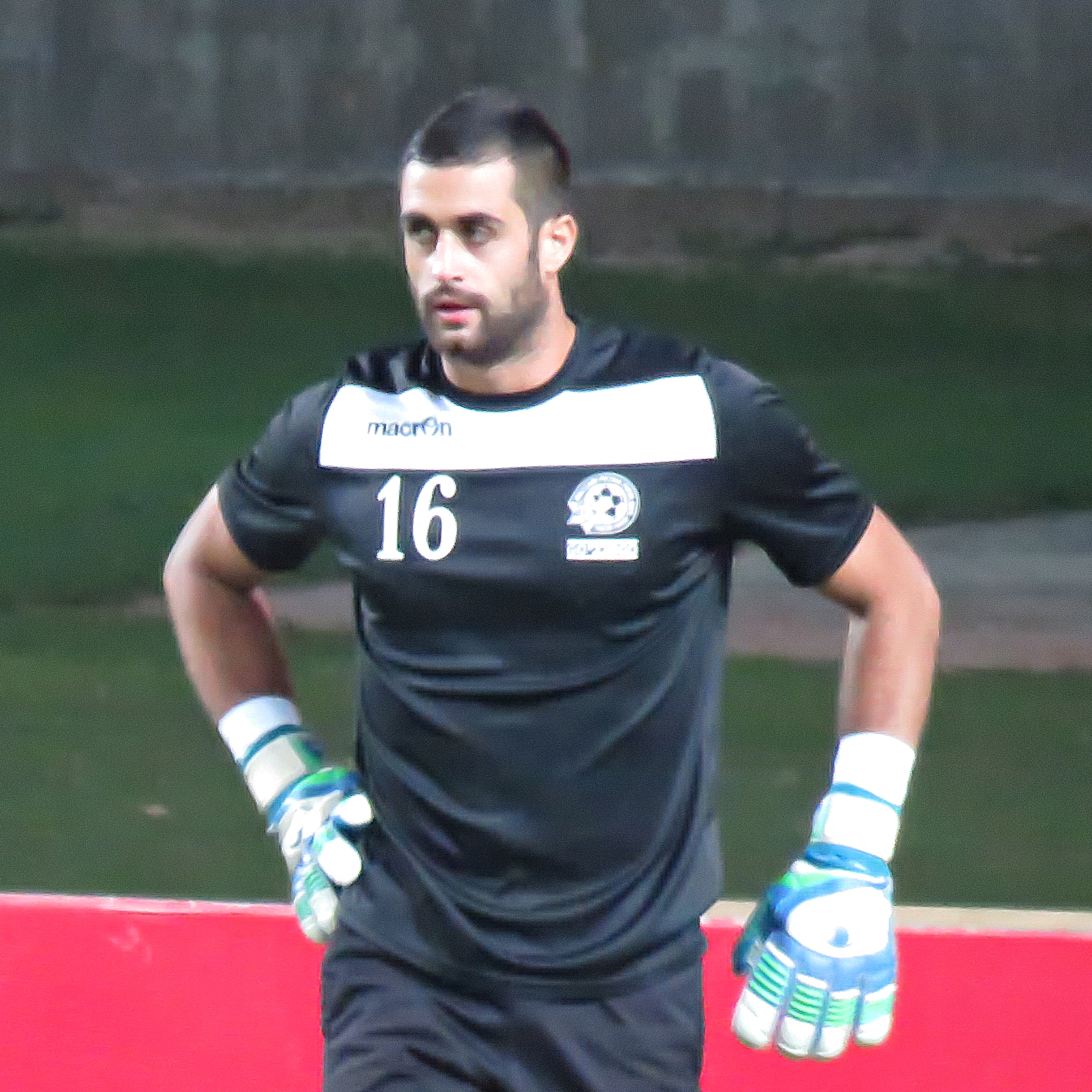

Personal information
- Full name: Zahi Gigi
- Date of birth: December 1, 1988 (age 37)
- Place of birth: Ramla, Israel
- Height: 1.90 m (6 ft 3 in)
- Position: Goalkeeper

Youth career
- Hapoel Ashkelon

Senior career*
Years	Team	Apps	(Gls)
2007–2011	Hapoel Ashkelon	6	(0)
2011–2012	Maccabi Kiryat Malakhi	20	(0)
2012–2013	Maccabi Sha'arayim	18	(0)
2013–2020	Maccabi Petah Tikva	104	(0)
- * Club domestic league appearances and goals as of 18 March 2019

Zahi Gigi (Hebrew: צחי גיגי; born 1 December 1988) is an Israeli footballer who currently plays at Maccabi Petah Tikva. He is of a Tunisian-Jewish descent.
