= Mohammed Kalibat =

Israeli footballer

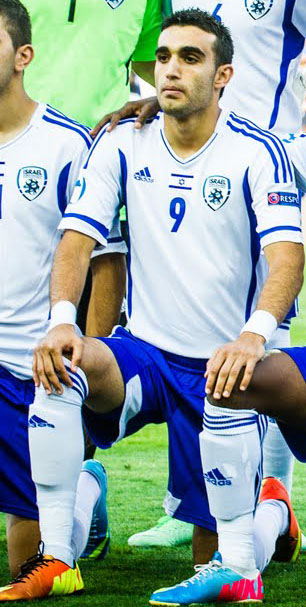
- Kalibat with Israel U21 in 2013

Personal information
- Full name: Mohammed Kalibat
- Date of birth: 15 June 1990 (age 36)
- Place of birth: Basmat Tab'un, Israel
- Height: 1.76 m (5 ft 9 1/2 in)
- Positions: Forward; left winger

Youth career
- Hapoel Nazareth Illit

Senior career*
Years	Team	Apps	(Gls)
2008–2010	Hapoel Nazareth Illit	19	(4)
2010–2016	Maccabi Haifa	12	(0)
2010–2011	→ Hapoel Acre (loan)	25	(5)
2011–2012	→ Maccabi Netanya (loan)	23	(3)
2012–2014	→ Bnei Sakhnin (loan)	65	(18)
2015	→ Bnei Sakhnin (loan)	9	(0)
2015–2016	→ Maccabi Petah Tikva (loan)	31	(4)
2016–2017	Maccabi Petah Tikva	17	(2)
2017	→ Hapoel Ra'anana (loan)	11	(3)
2017–2019	Bnei Sakhnin	35	(3)
2018	→ Hapoel Ra'anana (loan)	13	(2)
2019–2020	Hapoel Rishon LeZion	18	(2)
2020–2021	Hapoel Umm al-Fahm	23	(5)
2021–2023	F.C. Kafr Qasim	43	(7)
2023	Tzeirei Kafr Kanna	9	(5)

International career
2010–2013	Israel U21	14	(4)
- * Club domestic league appearances and goals

Mohammed Kalibat (Arabic: محمد كليبات, Hebrew: מוחמד כליבאת; born 15 June 1990) is an Israeli former footballer.

== Club career ==
Mohammad started his career in Nazareth Illit Academy and played as a professional too for only one year. In the summer of 2009, he signed a three-year contract with Maccabi Haifa F.C. and played there for only one year. In 2010, after one year with Maccabi Haifa, he was loaned to Hapoel Acre F.C. for one year. In 2011, after returning from loan from Hapoel Acre to Maccabi Haifa, he was loaned again to Maccabi Netanya F.C. and had successful year there with coach Reuven Atar. After the return from the second loan from Maccabi Netanya to Maccabi Haifa, he was loaned again to Arab side Bnei Sakhnin for one year. In July 2013, after finishing a hard season with Bnei Sakhnin F.C. and surviving at the first Division, he was transfers officially to Bnei Sakhnin and signed a two-year contract with the club.

== Personal life ==
Kalibat is Muslim.
