= List of Israeli football transfers summer 2022 =

This is a list of Israeli football transfers for the 2022 Summer Transfer Window.

== Ligat Ha'Al ==
=== Beitar Jerusalem ===
In:

No.	Pos.	Nation	Player
—	GK	ISR	Itamar Israeli (from Maccabi Haifa)
—	DF	ISR	Hagay Goldenberg (from Hapoel Nof HaGalil)
—	DF	ISR	Or Zahavi (from Bnei Yehuda)
—	DF	ISR	Uri Dahan (on loan from Maccabi Haifa)
—	MF	ISR	Bar Cohen (on loan from Maccabi Tel Aviv)
—	MF	ISR	Roei Fadida (loan return from Bnei Yehuda)
—	MF	ISR	Li On Mizrahi (from Hapoel Tel Aviv)
—	MF	ISR	Ilay Madmon (on loan from Hapoel Be'er Sheva)
—	FW	ISR	Avishay Cohen (from Bnei Yehuda)
—	FW	ISR	Stav Nahmani (on loan from Maccabi Haifa)
—	FW	ISR	Ronen Hanchis (on loan from Maccabi Tel Aviv)
—	FW	COL	Danilo Asprilla (from Hapoel Be'er Sheva)
—	FW	PAN	Eduardo Guerrero (on loan from Maccabi Tel Aviv)
—	FW	MDA	Ion Nicolaescu (from (Slovakia) DAC Dunajská Streda)

Out:

No.	Pos.	Nation	Player
—	GK	ISR	Itamar Nitzan (to Maccabi Netanya)
—	DF	ISR	Roy Herman (to (Bulgaria) Botev Plovdiv, previously loaned from Hapoel Ra'anana)
—	DF	ISR	Oren Biton (Free agent)
—	MF	ISR	Tamir Adi (Free agent)
—	MF	GUI	Kamso Mara (loan return to (Czech Republic) Slovan Liberec)
—	MF	ISR	Liran Rotman (to Maccabi Netanya)
—	MF	ISR	Omer Lakao (to Hapoel Ramat Gan)
—	MF	ISR	Michael Ohana (to Maccabi Netanya)
—	FW	ISR	David Dego (to Hapoel Ramat HaSharon)
—	FW	ISR	Uziel Pardo (to Hapoel Kfar Saba)
—	FW	GHA	Richmond Boakye (to (Greece) Lamia)
—	FW	SUR	Gleofilo Vlijter (to Hapoel Ramat Gan)
—	FW	ISR	Niv Zrihan (to Hapoel Tel Aviv)

=== Bnei Sakhnin ===
In:

No.	Pos.	Nation	Player
—	DF	ISR	Ovadia Darwish (from Hapoel Ramat HaSharon)
—	DF	ISR	Taleb Tawatha (from Maccabi Haifa)
—	MF	SVN	Mitja Lotrič (from (Germany) Würzburger Kickers)
—	DF	ISR	Hassan Hilo (loan return from Maccabi Bnei Reineh)
—	MF	ITA	Nicolao Dumitru (Free agent)
—	MF	ISR	Saher Taji (from Hapoel Ramat Gan)
—	MF	BEL	Jérémie Luvovadio (from (Belgium) Royal Excel Mouscron)
—	FW	ISR	Walid Darwish (from Hapoel Kfar Saba)
—	FW	RUS	German Onugkha (on loan from (Denmark) Vejle)
—	FW	ISR	Mohammed Awaed (from Maccabi Haifa)

Out:

No.	Pos.	Nation	Player
—	DF	ISR	Muhammad Othman (to F.C. Kafr Qasim)
—	DF	ISR	Omri Ben Harush (to Sektzia Ness Ziona)
—	MF	BRA	Ari Moura (to Sektzia Ness Ziona)
—	MF	ISR	Bashir Bajhat (to Hapoel Umm al-Fahm)
—	FW	ISR	Raz Stain (to Hapoel Petah Tikva)
—	FW	NGA	Odah Marshall (to Hapoel Umm al-Fahm)
—	MF	ISR	Mufleh Shalata (to Maccabi Bnei Reineh, previously loaned from Maccabi Tel Aviv)
—	FW	UGA	Fahad Bayo (loan return to F.C. Ashdod)
—	FW	ISR	Mohammed Khalaila (on loan to Maccabi Ata Bialik)

=== F.C. Ashdod ===
In:

No.	Pos.	Nation	Player
—	DF	ISR	David Cuperman (from (Colombia) Fortaleza)
—	DF	ISR	Manamto Asefa (from Bnei Yehuda)
—	MF	BRA	Lucas Salinas (Free agent)
—	MF	ISR	Nir Hasson (loan return from Hapoel Ashdod)
—	MF	ISR	Shay Ayzen (from Hapoel Tel Aviv)
—	MF	GHA	Isaac Pappoe (from (Ghana) Golden Kick)
—	FW	UGA	Fahad Bayo (loan return from Bnei Sakhnin)
—	FW	ISR	Yaniv Mizrahi (from Maccabi Netanya)
—	FW	GHA	Ebenezer Mamatah (from (Ghana) Skyy)
—	FW	ISR	Dor Jan (from (Portugal) Paços de Ferreira)

Out:

No.	Pos.	Nation	Player
—	GK	ISR	Raz Zaguri (on loan to Hapoel Ashdod)
—	DF	ISR	Mor Edri (to Hapoel Rishon LeZion)
—	DF	ISR	Bar Natanel (to Hapoel Petah Tikva)
—	DF	ISR	Sahar Revivo (to Hapoel Ashdod)
—	DF	ISR	Oshri Tadele (to Maccabi Ironi Ashdod)
—	DF	ISR	George Diba (to Hapoel Acre)
—	MF	ISR	Ataa Jaber (to (Azerbaijan) Neftçi)
—	MF	GHA	Lawrence Ofori (loan return to (Portugal) Famalicão)
—	MF	USA	Kenny Saief (to (Azerbaijan) Neftçi, previously loaned from (Belgium) Anderlecht)
—	MF	ISR	Fares Abu Akel (to (Azerbaijan) Gabala)
—	MF	ISR	Moti Barshazki (to Maccabi Petah Tikva)
—	MF	CMR	Martin Atemengue (on loan to Hapoel Ramat Gan)
—	MF	GHA	Issac Pappoe (on loan to Hapoel Ashdod)
—	FW	GRE	Dimitrios Diamantakos (loan return to (Croatia) Hajduk Split)
—	FW	ISR	Ben Mizan (to Hapoel Ramat Gan)
—	FW	ISR	Gal Katabi (to Hapoel Kfar Saba, his player card still belongs to Maccabi Haifa)
—	FW	ISR	Lior Inbrum (to Hapoel Umm al-Fahm)
—	FW	ISR	Noaf Bazea (to Maccabi Ahi Nazareth)

=== Hapoel Be'er Sheva ===
In:

No.	Pos.	Nation	Player
—	MF	BUL	Yoni Stoyanov (from Hapoel Kfar Saba)
—	MF	ISR	Shay Elias (from Hapoel Tel Aviv)
—	MF	ISR	Ilay Madmon (loan return from Bnei Yehuda)
—	MF	ISR	Ilay Trost (loan return from Sektzia Ness Ziona)
—	MF	ISR	Muatasem Issawi (from Ironi Nesher)
—	MF	ISR	Eden Shamir (from (Belgium) Standard Liège)
—	FW	RUS	Magomed-Shapi Suleymanov (on loan from (Russia) Krasnodar)
—	FW	ISR	Tomer Hemed (Free transfer)
—	FW	ISR	Netanel Hagani (from Tzeirei Kafr Kanna)
—	FW	KOS	Astrit Selmani (from (Sweden) Hammarby IF)
—	FW	ROU	Adrian Păun (on loan from (Romania) CFR Cluj)

Out:

No.	Pos.	Nation	Player
—	GK	ISR	Amit Keren (to Hapoel Nof HaGalil)
—	DF	ISR	Hatem Elhamed (to Hapoel Haifa)
—	MF	BRA	Gustavo Marmentini (to (Greece) PAS Lamia 1964, previously loaned from Hapoel Hadera)
—	MF	ISR	Ilay Madmon (on loan to Beitar Jerusalem)
—	MF	BUL	Yoni Stoyanov (on loan to Sektzia Ness Ziona)
—	MF	ISR	David Keltjens (to Hapoel Tel Aviv)
—	FW	ISR	Qays Ghanem (to Hapoel Tel Aviv)
—	FW	AUS	Nikita Rukavytsya (to Maccabi Haifa)
—	FW	COL	Danilo Asprilla (to Beitar Jerusalem)
—	FW	ISR	Netanel Hagani (on loan to Hapoel Ramat HaSharon)
—	FW	ISR	Rom Aligon (on loan to Hapoel Hadera)

=== Hapoel Hadera ===
In:

No.	Pos.	Nation	Player
—	GK	ISR	Guy Herman (from Hapoel Ashdod)
—	DF	NGA	Philip Ipole (on loan from (Russia) Olimp-Dolgoprudny)
—	DF	SVN	Klemen Šturm (from (Slovenia) Mura)
—	DF	ISR	Tarek Boshnak (from Maccabi Ahi Nazareth)
—	DF	ISR	Tomer Machluf (on loan from Maccabi Tel Aviv)
—	MF	BEL	Samy Bourard (from (Netherlands) ADO Den Haag)
—	MF	ISR	Sa'ar Fadida (from Hapoel Haifa)
—	MF	NGA	Muhammed Usman (to Sektzia Ness Ziona)
—	MF	ISR	Niv Gotlieb (from Hapoel Ra'anana)
—	MF	ISR	Nico Olsak (from Maccabi Petah Tikva)
—	MF	ISR	Nehorai Ifrach (on loan from Maccabi Haifa)
—	FW	ISR	Mohammed Khatib (from F.C. Kafr Qasim)
—	FW	ISR	Eyal Hen (on loan from Maccabi Tel Aviv)
—	FW	ISR	Amit Yeverbaum (from Hapoel Kfar Saba)
—	FW	ISR	Tom Berkovic (from Hapoel Ramat Gan)
—	FW	ISR	Rom Aligon (on loan from Hapoel Be'er Sheva)

Out:

No.	Pos.	Nation	Player
—	GK	ISR	Adi Tabachnik (to Bnei Yehuda)
—	DF	ISR	Dolev Azrual (to Maccabi Bnei Reineh)
—	DF	BUL	Ivaylo Markov (to (Poland) Podbeskidzie)
—	MF	ISR	Amit Mor (to Hapoel Nof HaGalil)
—	MF	ISR	Maxim Plakuschenko (to (Hungary) Budapest Honvéd, previously loaned from Maccabi Haifa)
—	MF	ISR	Awajo Asefa (to Hapoel Kfar Saba)
—	MF	BRA	Gustavo Marmentini (to (Greece) PAS Lamia 1964, previously loaned from Hapoel Hadera)
—	FW	ISR	Shoval Gozlan (to Hapoel Haifa)
—	FW	ISR	Bar Nawi (to Hapoel Hadera)

=== Hapoel Haifa ===
In:

No.	Pos.	Nation	Player
—	GK	ISR	Amit Suiri (loan return from Hapoel Acre)
—	DF	ROU	Andrei Miron (from (Romania) FCSB)
—	DF	CRO	Dino Štiglec (from (Poland) Śląsk Wrocław)
—	DF	CYP	Constantinos Soteriou (loan from (Cyprus) AEL Limassol)
—	DF	ISR	Guy Mizrahi (on loan from Maccabi Tel Aviv)
—	DF	ISR	Hatem Elhamed (from Hapoel Be'er Sheva)
—	MF	ISR	Gidi Kanyuk (from (Thailand) Chonburi)
—	MF	SLE	Kwame Quee (from (Saudi Arabia) Najran)
—	MF	ISR	Amit Meir (from Maccabi Petah Tikva)
—	MF	MDA	Nichita Moțpan (from (Moldova) Bălți)
—	MF	POR	Leandro Silva (from (Portugal) Arouca)
—	MF	ISR	Eliel Peretz (Free transfer)
—	FW	UKR	Illya Markovskyi (from (Greece) Rodos)
—	FW	ISR	Shoval Gozlan (from Hapoel Hadera)
—	FW	LBR	Mohammed Kamara (from (Turkey) Hatayspor)

Out:

No.	Pos.	Nation	Player
—	GK	ISR	Tal Bomshtein (to Hapoel Umm al-Fahm)
—	DF	NGA	Izuchuckwu Anthony (to (Saudi Arabia) Khaleej)
—	DF	ISR	Guy Mishpati (to Maccabi Jaffa)
—	DF	ISR	Ali Kayal (to Hapoel Ramat Gan)
—	DF	ISR	Ofek Fishler (to Hapoel Petah Tikva, previously loaned)
—	DF	ISR	Ben Vehava (to Ironi Tiberias)
—	DF	ROU	Andrei Miron (Free agent)
—	MF	ISR	Sa'ar Fadida (to Hapoel Hadera)
—	MF	ISR	Ness Zamir (to Sektzia Ness Ziona)
—	MF	GAM	Saikou Touray (to (France) Grenoble, previously loaned from Maccabi Haifa)
—	MF	ISR	Snir Talias (on loan to Ironi Tiberias)
—	MF	ISR	Yarin Gavri (on loan to Maccabi Ahi Nazareth)
—	MF	POR	Leandro Silva (Free agent)
—	FW	SVN	Alen Ožbolt (to Hapoel Tel Aviv, previously loaned from (Slovakia) Slovan Bratislava)
—	FW	ISR	Dudu Alterovich (on loan to Hapoel Nof HaGalil)

=== Hapoel Jerusalem ===
In:

No.	Pos.	Nation	Player
—	GK	ISR	Omer Kabilo (from Maccabi Haifa)
—	DF	ISR	Alon Azugi (on loan from Hapoel Tel Aviv)
—	DF	ISR	Benny Tridovsky (on loan from Hapoel Tel Aviv)
—	DF	ISR	Amit Glazer (on loan from Maccabi Tel Aviv)
—	MF	ISR	Tomer Altman (from (Netherlands) Roda JC)
—	MF	ISR	Nadav Nidam (on loan from Maccabi Tel Aviv)
—	MF	ISR	Golan Beni (from Hapoel Ra'anana)
—	FW	CIV	William Togui (on loan from (Belgium) Mechelen)
—	FW	COD	Jordan Botaka (on loan from (Belgium) Gent)
—	FW	ISR	Yoav Tomer (from Hapoel Tel Aviv)

Out:

No.	Pos.	Nation	Player
—	GK	ISR	Aviram Ziat (to F.C. Jerusalem)
—	DF	ISR	Gal Mayo (to Bnei Yehuda)
—	MF	ISR	Solomon Daniel (to Hapoel Umm al-Fahm)
—	MF	ISR	Ruslan Barsky (to Maccabi Bnei Reineh)
—	DF	ISR	Sahar Brown (Free agent)
—	DF	ISR	Maor Jerassi (Free agent)
—	MF	ISR	Guy Hadida (Free agent)
—	MF	GHA	Cletus Nombil (Free agent)
—	MF	NGA	Hamed Sholaja (Free agent)
—	MF	ISR	Meidan Cohen (on loan to Hapoel Ashdod)
—	FW	NGA	Bright Enobakhare (Free agent)
—	FW	NGA	William Agada (to (United States) Sporting Kansas City)
—	FW	PAN	Eduardo Guerrero (loan return to Maccabi Tel Aviv)
—	FW	ISR	Liran Elmaliah (on loan to Hapoel Ramat Gan)

=== Hapoel Tel Aviv ===
In:

No.	Pos.	Nation	Player
—	GK	NZL	Stefan Marinovic (from Hapoel Nof HaGalil)
—	DF	ISR	Dor Elo (from Maccabi Petah Tikva)
—	DF	ISR	Itzik Shoolmayster (loan return from Maccabi Ahi Nazareth)
—	DF	ISR	Yahav Gurfinkel (Free transfer)
—	DF	CIV	Abou Dosso (from Hapoel Rishon LeZion)
—	DF	GUI	Antoine Conte (from (Romania) Universitatea Craiova)
—	MF	ISR	Hisham Layous (from F.C. Kafr Qasim)
—	MF	NED	Godfried Roemeratoe (from (Netherlands) Twente)
—	MF	ESP	Pablo González (from (Czech Republic) Sigma Olomouc)
—	MF	ISR	Sintayehu Sallalich (from (Turkey) Gençlerbirliği)
—	MF	ISR	Shavit Mazal (loan return from Hapoel Ashdod)
—	MF	ISR	David Keltjens (from Hapoel Be'er Sheva)
—	FW	ISR	Qays Ghanem (from Hapoel Be'er Sheva)
—	FW	SVN	Alen Ožbolt (from (Slovakia) Slovan Bratislava)
—	FW	ISR	Niv Zrihan (from Beitar Jerusalem)

Out:

No.	Pos.	Nation	Player
—	GK	ISR	Yigal Becker (to Hapoel Kfar Saba)
—	GK	LTU	Ernestas Šetkus (Free agent)
—	GK	ISR	Roy Baranes (to Shimshon Tel Aviv)
—	DF	GUI	Mohamed Kalil Traoré (to (Bulgaria) Lokomotiv Plovdiv)
—	DF	ISR	Alon Azugi (on loan to Hapoel Jerusalem)
—	DF	ISR	Benny Tridovsky (on loan to Hapoel Jerusalem)
—	DF	ISR	Doron Leidner (to (Greece) Olympiacos)
—	DF	ISR	Tom Ahi Mordechai (on loan to Bnei Yehuda)
—	DF	ISR	Itzik Shoolmayster (to Maccabi Jaffa)
—	MF	GLP	Ange-Freddy Plumain (loan return to (Ukraine) Rukh Lviv)
—	MF	MNE	Marko Janković (to (Azerbaijan) Qarabağ)
—	MF	ISR	Shay Elias (to Hapoel Be'er Sheva)
—	MF	ISR	Shay Ayzen (to F.C. Ashdod)
—	MF	ISR	Li On Mizrahi (to Beitar Jerusalem)
—	FW	ISR	Shlomi Azulay (to Maccabi Bnei Reineh)
—	FW	ISR	Eden Hershkovitz (to (Malta) Floriana)
—	FW	ISR	Osher Davida (to (Belgium) Standard Liège)
—	FW	ISR	Yoav Tomer (to Hapoel Jerusalem)

=== Ironi Kiryat Shmona ===
In:

No.	Pos.	Nation	Player
—	GK	ISR	Assaf Tzur (from Hapoel Ra'anana)
—	DF	ISR	Noam Cohen (from Maccabi Tel Aviv)
—	DF	ISR	Ofir Benbenisti (from Hapoel Ramat Gan)
—	MF	ISR	Yoav Hofmayster (from (Austria) LASK)
—	MF	ISR	Timothy Muzie (on loan from Maccabi Haifa)
—	FW	CIV	Senin Sebai (from (Russia) Akhmat Grozny)
—	FW	MLT	Joseph Mbong (on loan from (Malta) Ħamrun Spartans)

Out:

No.	Pos.	Nation	Player
—	DF	ISR	Alaa Jafar (to Bnei Yehuda)
—	DF	ISR	Erez Isakov (to Maccabi Ahi Nazareth)
—	DF	ISR	Guy Mizrahi (loan return to Maccabi Tel Aviv)
—	MF	ISR	Adrian Rochet (Retired)
—	MF	ISR	Nadav Nidam (to Hapoel Jerusalem, his player card still belongs to Maccabi Tel Aviv)
—	MF	SVK	Július Szöke (to (Cyprus) Aris Limassol)
—	FW	ENG	Morgan Ferrier (to (Thailand) Nakhon Ratchasima)

=== Maccabi Bnei Reineh ===
In:

No.	Pos.	Nation	Player
—	GK	ISR	Arik Yanko (from Maccabi Petah Tikva)
—	DF	AUT	Lukas Spendlhofer (from (Italy) Ascoli)
—	DF	GNB	Sambinha (from (Greece) Olympiakos Nicosia)
—	DF	ISR	Dolev Azrual (from Hapoel Hadera)
—	DF	ISR	Nir Bardea (from (Hungary) Budapest Honvéd)
—	DF	ISR	Alon Ginat (from Maccabi Netanya)
—	MF	ISR	Ruslan Barsky (from Hapoel Jerusalem)
—	MF	ISR	Ali Abbas (from F.C. Tzeirei Kafr Kanna)
—	MF	GHA	Richard Boateng (from (Spain) Cartagena)
—	MF	UKR	Oleksandr Noyok (from (Cyprus) Apollon Limassol)
—	FW	NAM	Benson Shilongo (from (Egypt) Ismaily)
—	FW	ISR	Shlomi Azulay (from Hapoel Tel Aviv)
—	FW	ISR	Ahmed Abed (from Maccabi Ahi Nazareth)
—	FW	ISR	Muflah Shalata (from Maccabi Tel Aviv, previously loaned to Bnei Sakhnin)
—	FW	SRB	Lazar Jovanović (from (Serbia) FK Radnički Niš)
—	FW	ISR	Amit Zenati (from Maccabi Haifa)

Out:

No.	Pos.	Nation	Player
—	GK	ISR	Golan Elkaslasy (to Hapoel Ramat HaSharon)
—	DF	ISR	Yakov Ababa (to Ironi Tiberias)
—	DF	ISR	Atef Musa (to Maccabi Ahi Nazareth)
—	DF	ISR	Hassan Hilo (loan return to Bnei Sakhnin)
—	DF	ISR	Fehmi Halabi (to Maccabi Nujeidat)
—	MF	ISR	Reef Mesika (to Hapoel Umm al-Fahm)
—	MF	ISR	Phillip Manneh (to F.C. Tira)
—	MF	ISR	Matanel Tadesa (to Ironi Tiberias)
—	MF	ISR	Amir Agayev (to Bnei Yehuda)
—	FW	BRA	Julio César (to Ironi Tiberias)
—	FW	NGA	Benjamin Kuku (to Maccabi Ahi Nazareth)
—	FW	ISR	Ali Kna'ana (to Maccabi Ahi Nazareth)
—	FW	ISR	Karem Arshid (to Hapoel Acre)
—	FW	NAM	Benson Shilongo (to (South Africa) Ismaily)

=== Maccabi Haifa ===
In:

No.	Pos.	Nation	Player
—	DF	ISR	Inon Eliyahu (from Maccabi Petah Tikva)
—	DF	SWE	Daniel Sundgren (from (Greece) Aris)
—	DF	FRA	Pierre Cornud (from (Spain) Real Oviedo)
—	DF	FRA	Dylan Batubinsika (from (Portugal) Famalicão)
—	DF	SEN	Abdoulaye Seck (from (Belgium) Antwerp)
—	MF	ISR	Ilay Hagag (loan return from Hapoel Afula)
—	MF	ISR	Nehorai Ifrach (loan return from Hapoel Afula)
—	FW	AUS	Nikita Rukavytsya (from Hapoel Be'er Sheva)
—	FW	HAI	Frantzdy Pierrot (from (France) Guingamp)
—	FW	ISR	Suf Podgoreanu (on loan from (Italy) Spezia)

Out:

No.	Pos.	Nation	Player
—	GK	ISR	Omer Kabilo (to Hapoel Jerusalem)
—	GK	ISR	Liav Salkind (on loan to Hapoel Afula)
—	GK	ISR	Itamar Israeli (to Beitar Jerusalem)
—	DF	AUS	Ryan Strain (to (Scotland) St Mirren)
—	DF	GLP	Mickaël Alphonse (to (France) Ajaccio)
—	DF	ISR	Taleb Tawatha (to Bnei Sakhnin)
—	DF	ISR	Itamar Guri (on loan to Hapoel Ramat HaSharon)
—	DF	SRB	Bogdan Planić (to (United Arab Emirates) Shabab Al Ahli Club)
—	DF	ISR	Uri Dahan (on loan to Beitar Jerusalem)
—	MF	ISR	Maxim Plakuschenko (to (Hungary) Budapest Honvéd, previously loaned to Hapoel Hadera)
—	MF	GAM	Saikou Touray (to (France) Grenoble)
—	MF	ISR	Nevo Shedo (on loan to Hapoel Nof HaGalil)
—	MF	ESP	José Rodríguez (to (Belgium) Royale Union Saint-Gilloise)
—	MF	ISR	Nehorai Ifrach (on loan to Hapoel Hadera)
—	FW	ISR	Guy Dahan (to (Austria) Rheindorf Altach, previously loaned to Hapoel Umm al-Fahm)
—	FW	GHA	Godsway Donyoh (to (Azerbaijan) Neftçi)
—	FW	ISR	Mohammed Awaed (to Bnei Sakhnin, previously loaned to Maccabi Petah Tikva)
—	FW	ISR	Amit Zenati (to Maccabi Bnei Reineh, previously loaned to Bnei Yehuda)

=== Maccabi Netanya ===
In:

No.	Pos.	Nation	Player
—	GK	ISR	Itamar Nitzan (from Beitar Jerusalem)
—	GK	ISR	Shachar Ben Yakar (from Hapoel Ra'anana)
—	DF	GER	Florian Hartherz (from (Germany) Fortuna Düsseldorf)
—	DF	ISR	Rotem Keller (loan return from (Hungary) Diósgyőr)
—	DF	ISR	Moshe Mula (loan return from Sektzia Ness Ziona)
—	MF	GER	Erich Berko (from (Germany) SV Sandhausen)
—	MF	ISR	Liran Rotman (from Beitar Jerusalem)
—	MF	ISR	Naftali Belay (loan return from Hapoel Ramat HaSharon)
—	MF	ISR	Michael Ohana (from Beitar Jerusalem)
—	FW	ISR	Gil Itzhak (from Hapoel Kfar Saba)
—	FW	ISR	Roy Korine (loan return from Hapoel Ramat Gan)

Out:

No.	Pos.	Nation	Player
—	GK	ISR	Danny Amos (to Maccabi Petah Tikva)
—	GK	ISR	Adi Nassa (to Hapoel Bik'at HaYarden)
—	DF	SRB	Zlatan Šehović (to (Serbia) Partizan)
—	MF	CIV	Parfait Guiagon (loan return to Maccabi Tel Aviv)
—	MF	ISR	Hen Ezra (Retired)
—	MF	ISR	Aviv Kanarik (on loan to Hapoel Ashdod)
—	MF	ISR	Niv Livnat (on loan to Hapoel Ashdod)
—	FW	ISR	Yaniv Mizrahi (to F.C. Ashdod)
—	FW	ISR	Ron Ashkenazi (Free agent)
—	FW	ISR	Eyal Abadi (on loan to Hapoel Ramat HaSharon)

=== Maccabi Tel Aviv ===
In:

No.	Pos.	Nation	Player
—	DF	ISR	Guy Mizrahi (loan return from Ironi Kiryat Shmona)
—	DF	NED	Derrick Luckassen (from (Netherlands) PSV Eindhoven)
—	MF	NED	Joris van Overeem (from (Netherlands) Utrecht)
—	MF	CIV	Parfait Guiagon (loan return from Maccabi Netanya)
—	MF	ISR	Nir Bitton (from (Scotland) Celtic)
—	MF	ISR	Dor Peretz (from (Italy) Venezia)
—	MF	ISR	Yonatan Cohen (from (Italy) Pisa)
—	FW	ISR	Eran Zahavi (from (Netherlands) PSV)
—	FW	PAN	Eduardo Guerrero (loan return from Hapoel Jerusalem)

Out:

No.	Pos.	Nation	Player
—	DF	ISR	Matan Baltaxa (to Austria Wien)
—	DF	ISR	Noam Cohen (to Ironi Kiryat Shmona)
—	DF	ISR	Tomer Machluf (on loan to Hapoel Hadera)
—	DF	ISR	Guy Mizrahi (on loan to Hapoel Haifa)
—	DF	ISR	Shon Edri (on loan to Hapoel Ashdod)
—	DF	ISR	Amit Kodman (on loan to Hapoel Kfar Shalem)
—	MF	TAN	Novatus Dismas (to (Belgium) Zulte Waregem)
—	MF	ISR	Eden Shamir (loan return to (Belgium) Standard Liège)
—	MF	ISR	Aner Oshmandi (on loan to Hapoel Ashdod)
—	MF	CUW	Brandley Kuwas (to (Turkey) Giresunspor)
—	FW	ISR	Tal Ben Haim (to Maccabi Petah Tikva)
—	FW	ISR	Eylon Almog (on loan to (Austria) TSV Hartberg)
—	FW	PAN	Eduardo Guerrero (on loan to Beitar Jerusalem)
—	FW	CRO	Stipe Perica (to (Belgium) Standard Liège)

=== Sektzia Ness Ziona ===
In:

No.	Pos.	Nation	Player
—	DF	ISR	Miki Siroshtein (from Bnei Yehuda)
—	DF	ISR	Uri Magbo (from Hapoel Kfar Saba)
—	DF	ISR	Omri Ben Harush (from Bnei Sakhnin)
—	DF	CIV	Stephane Acka (Free transfer)
—	MF	ISR	Eylon Yerushalmi (from Hapoel Ramat Gan)
—	MF	ISR	Almog Buzaglo (from Bnei Yehuda)
—	MF	GLP	Ange-Freddy Plumain (from (Ukraine) Rukh Lviv)
—	MF	ISR	Ness Zamir (from Hapoel Haifa)
—	MF	NGA	Muhammed Usman (from Hapoel Hadera)
—	MF	CIV	Aboubakar Keita (from (Belgium) Charleroi)
—	MF	BUL	Yoni Stoyanov (on loan from Hapoel Be'er Sheva)
—	FW	BRA	Ari Moura (from Bnei Sakhnin)
—	FW	ISR	Or Roizman (on loan from Maccabi Tel Aviv, previously loaned to Beitar Tel Aviv Bat Yam)

Out:

No.	Pos.	Nation	Player
—	GK	ISR	Ido Asakpa (on loan to Shimshon Kafr Qasim)
—	DF	ISR	Kobi Mor (to Hapoel Umm al-Fahm)
—	DF	ISR	Yuval Levin (to Hapoel Nof HaGalil, his player card still belongs to Ironi Kiryat Shmona)
—	DF	ISR	Moshe Mula (loan return to Maccabi Netanya)
—	DF	HAI	Djimy Alexis (to Hapoel Petah Tikva)
—	DF	ISR	Daniel Busi (to Shimshon Tel Aviv)
—	DF	ISR	Eitan Komisarov (on loan to Hapoel Bik'at HaYarden)
—	MF	ISR	Shay Mazor (to F.C. Kafr Qasim)
—	MF	ISR	Omri Shekel (to Hapoel Kfar Shalem)
—	MF	ISR	Ilay Trost (loan return to Hapoel Be'er Sheva)
—	MF	ISR	Yarden Sidi (to Shimshon Tel Aviv)
—	MF	ISR	Ismaeel Ryan (to Hapoel Umm al-Fahm)
—	MF	CIV	Donald Kodia (Free agent)
—	FW	ISR	Dudu Biton (to Maccabi Petah Tikva)
—	FW	ISR	Almog Shankor (to Hapoel Afula)

== Ligat Lemuit ==
=== Bnei Yehuda ===
In:

No.	Pos.	Nation	Player
—	GK	ISR	Adi Tabachnik (from Hapoel Hadera)
—	DF	ISR	Aviv Salem (from Hapoel Petah Tikva)
—	DF	ISR	Gal Mayo (from Hapoel Jerusalem)
—	DF	ISR	Amit Bitton (from (Bulgaria) Beroe)
—	DF	ISR	Alaa Jafar (from Ironi Kiryat Shmona)
—	DF	ISR	Tom Ahi Mordechai (on loan from Hapoel Tel Aviv)
—	DF	ISR	Daniel Fleczer (from Maccabi Petah Tikva)
—	DF	ISR	Omer Yitzhak (on loan from Maccabi Tel Aviv)
—	MF	NGA	Aliyu Adam (from Hapoel Acre)
—	MF	ISR	Adar Awat (on loan from F.C. Ashdod)
—	MF	ISR	Roy Dayan (from F.C. Kafr Qasim)
—	MF	ISR	Guy Sivilia (from Hapoel Ramat HaSharon)
—	MF	ISR	Amir Agayev (from Maccabi Bnei Reineh)
—	MF	ISR	Roy Benbenisti (from F.C. Holon Yermiyahu)
—	FW	GHA	Karim Abubakar (from Hapoel Acre)
—	FW	BRA	Michael Thuíque (from (Lithuania) Kauno Žalgiris)

Out:

No.	Pos.	Nation	Player
—	GK	ISR	Shahar Amsalem (to Hapoel Qalansawe)
—	DF	ISR	Miki Siroshtein (to Sektzia Ness Ziona)
—	DF	ISR	Amit Glazer (to Hapoel Jerusalem, his player card still belongs to Maccabi Tel Aviv)
—	DF	ISR	Or Zahavi (to Beitar Jerusalem)
—	DF	ISR	Manamto Asefa (to F.C. Ashdod)
—	DF	ISR	Amir Rustum (to Maccabi Ahi Nazareth)
—	MF	ISR	Ben Reichert (to Hapoel Ramat HaSharon)
—	MF	ISR	Almog Buzaglo (to Sektzia Ness Ziona)
—	MF	ISR	Ilay Madmon (loan return to Hapoel Be'er Sheva)
—	MF	ISR	Roei Fadida (loan return to Beitar Jerusalem)
—	MF	ISR	Tambi Sagas (to F.C. Kafr Qasim)
—	MF	POR	Tomás Podstawski (to (Cyprus) Karmiotissa)
—	MF	ISR	Yisrael Zaguri (Free agent)
—	FW	ISR	Avishay Cohen (to Beitar Jerusalem)
—	FW	BRA	Lúcio Maranhão (to (Brazil) América de Natal)
—	FW	ISR	Amit Zenati (to Maccabi Bnei Reineh, previously loaned from Maccabi Haifa)

=== F.C. Kafr Qasim ===
In:

No.	Pos.	Nation	Player
—	GK	ISR	Idan Vaxelman (from Hapoel Hod HaSharon)
—	DF	ISR	Muhammed Othman (from Bnei Sakhnin)
—	DF	ISR	Amir Ben Shimon (from Hapoel Ra'anana)
—	DF	ISR	Iham Adbah (from F.C. Kafr Qasim)
—	MF	ISR	Shay Mazor (from Sektzia Ness Ziona)
—	MF	ISR	Tambi Sagas (from Bnei Yehuda)
—	MF	ISR	Ismaeel Ryan (from Sektzia Ness Ziona)
—	MF	ISR	Dor Edri (from Hapoel Ramat Gan)
—	FW	ISR	Mahmoud Awisat (from (Palestine) Hilal Al-Quds)
—	FW	ISR	Ahmed Darawshe (from Hapoel Acre)
—	FW	ISR	Mohammed Badir (from Hapoel Baqa al-Gharbiyye)
—	FW	FRA	Vamara Sanogo (from (Poland) Zagłębie Sosnowiec)
—	FW	ISR	Abdallah Khlaikhal (from (United Arab Emirates) Al-Nasr)

Out:

No.	Pos.	Nation	Player
—	DF	ISR	Sahar Dabah (to Hapoel Ashdod)
—	DF	SRB	Nikola Ćirković (to (Serbia) Mladost Lučani)
—	DF	ISR	Dror Nir (to Hapoel Petah Tikva)
—	MF	ISR	Hisham Layous (to Hapoel Tel Aviv)
—	MF	GHA	Gideon Akaouwa (to Maccabi Petah Tikva)
—	MF	ISR	Elad Shahaf (to (Romania) FC Botoșani)
—	MF	ISR	Itay Swisa (to F.C. Tira)
—	MF	ISR	Roy Dayan (to Bnei Yehuda)
—	MF	ISR	Hamed Badir (Free agent)
—	FW	ISR	Mohammed Khatib (to Hapoel Hadera)
—	FW	ISR	Moti Malka (to Hapoel Nof HaGalil)
—	FW	ISR	Samah Mar'ab (to Hapoel Umm al-Fahm)
—	FW	ISR	Amran El Krenawy (to (Israel) F.C. Dimona)

=== Hapoel Acre ===
In:

No.	Pos.	Nation	Player
—	GK	ISR	Nassim Hayek (from Nordia Jerusalem)
—	DF	ISR	Sapir Itah (from Hapoel Kfar Shalem)
—	DF	ISR	George Diba (from F.C. Ashdod)
—	MF	ISR	Yonatan Teper (from Hapoel Marmorek)
—	MF	ISR	Iham Shehade (from Hapoel Kafr Kanna)
—	MF	ISR	Gal Aviv (on loan from F.C. Ashdod)
—	MF	ISR	Mohammed Abu Fani (from Hapoel Bnei Fureidis)
—	FW	ISR	Yahav Afriat (from F.C. Tira)
—	FW	ISR	Karem Arshid (from Maccabi Bnei Reineh)
—	FW	CRO	Krešimir Kovačević (from (Austria) SKN St. Pölten)

Out:

No.	Pos.	Nation	Player
—	GK	ISR	Amit Suiri (loan return to Hapoel Haifa)
—	DF	ISR	Ohad Atia (to Maccabi Ironi Ashdod)
—	DF	ISR	Matan Levi (to Hapoel Ramat Gan, his player card still belongs to Maccabi Netanya)
—	DF	ISR	Gal Kolani (to Maccabi Petah Tikva)
—	MF	NGA	Aliyu Adam (to Bnei Yehuda)
—	MF	ISR	Mohammed Madi (to Maccabi Ata Bialik)
—	MF	ISR	Yarin Sharabi (to F.C. Tzeirei Tayibe)
—	FW	GHA	Karim Abubakar (to Bnei Yehuda)
—	FW	ISR	Ahmad Darawshe (to F.C. Kafr Qasim)
—	FW	ISR	Gil Haddad (to F.C. Dimona)
—	FW	GER	Krešimir Kovačević (to (Croatia) Rudeš)

=== Hapoel Afula ===
In:

No.	Pos.	Nation	Player
—	DF	ISR	Adar Azruel (on loan from Maccabi Haifa)
—	DF	ISR	Sahar Ben Menashe (from Hapoel Herzliya)
—	MF	FRA	Sacha Petshi (from (Andorra) Engordany)
—	MF	ISR	Neil Goldberg (Free transfer)
—	FW	ISR	Roy Ronen (from Hapoel Ramat HaSharon)
—	FW	ISR	Almog Shankor (from Sektzia Ness Ziona)

Out:

No.	Pos.	Nation	Player
—	GK	ISR	Tomer Haran (to (Slovenia) Rudar Velenje)
—	DF	GAM	Kabba Sonko (Free agent)
—	MF	ISR	Mohammed Gadir (to Maccabi Ahi Nazareth, his player card still belongs to Maccabi Haifa)
—	MF	ISR	Ilay Hagag (loan return to Maccabi Haifa)
—	MF	ISR	Raz Cohen (to Hapoel Ramat Gan)
—	MF	ISR	Jay Livne (to Maccabi Ahi Nazareth)
—	MF	ISR	Nehorai Ifrach (loan return to Maccabi Haifa)
—	FW	ISR	Michael Ashkenazi (to Hapoel Ashdod)
—	FW	ISR	Roy Ronen (Free agent)

=== Hapoel Ashdod ===
In:

No.	Pos.	Nation	Player
—	GK	ISR	Matan Zalmanovic (from Hapoel Kfar Saba)
—	GK	ISR	Raz Zaguri (on loan from F.C. Ashdod)
—	DF	ISR	Tal Makhlouf (from Hapoel Kfar Saba)
—	DF	ISR	Shon Edri (on loan from Maccabi Tel Aviv)
—	DF	ISR	Sahar Dabah (from F.C. Kafr Qasim)
—	DF	ISR	Noam Cohen (from Hapoel Kfar Shalem)
—	DF	ISR	Roy Amos (from Hapoel Ramat HaSharon)
—	DF	ISR	Sahar Revivo (from F.C. Ashdod)
—	MF	ISR	Yam Cohen (from Hapoel Umm al-Fahm)
—	MF	ISR	Aner Oshmandi (on loan from Maccabi Tel Aviv)
—	MF	BRA	Pedro Sass (from Hapoel Umm al-Fahm)
—	MF	ISR	Aviv Kanarik (on loan from Maccabi Netanya)
—	MF	ISR	Niv Livnat (on loan from Maccabi Netanya)
—	MF	ISR	Moshe Meir (on loan from Maccabi Petah Tikva)
—	MF	ISR	Bar Swisa (on loan from F.C. Ashdod)
—	MF	ISR	Meidan Cohen (on loan from Hapoel Jerusalem)
—	MF	GHA	Issac Pappoe (on loan from F.C. Ashdod)
—	MF	ISR	Shon Weiss (from Hapoel Ramat HaSharon)
—	FW	ISR	Michael Ashkenazi (from Hapoel Afula)
—	FW	NGA	Chikeluba Ofoedu (from (Nigeria) Adoration)

Out:

No.	Pos.	Nation	Player
—	GK	ISR	Guy Herman (to Hapoel Hadera)
—	GK	ISR	Gal Navon (to Maccabi Jaffa)
—	DF	ISR	Liel Biton (to Maccabi Jaffa)
—	DF	ISR	Osher Abu (to Hapoel Ramat Gan)
—	DF	ISR	Niran Rotshtein (to Hapoel Ramat Gan)
—	DF	ISR	Avi Malka (to F.C. Dimona)
—	DF	ISR	Ofer Verta (to Hapoel Ramat Gan)
—	DF	ISR	Shalev Avitan (to Maccabi Sha'arayim)
—	DF	ISR	Afek Navot (Free agent)
—	MF	ISR	Bentzi Moshel (to Hapoel Ramat Gan)
—	MF	ISR	Itamar Noy (to (Austria) First Vienna)
—	MF	ISR	Shavit Mazal (loan return to Hapoel Tel Aviv)
—	MF	CIV	Ibrahim Pekegnon Kone (to (Cyprus) Akritas Chlorakas)
—	MF	ISR	Nir Hasson (loan return to F.C. Ashdod)
—	MF	ISR	Adar Awat (to Bnei Yehuda, his player card still belongs to F.C. Ashdod)
—	MF	ISR	Benny Natan (to Maccabi Yavne)
—	MF	ISR	Yam Cohen (to Hapoel Marmorek)
—	FW	ISR	Hamza Mawassi (to Hapoel Ramat Gan)
—	FW	ISR	Michael Ashkenazi (to Maccabi Tamra)

=== Hapoel Kfar Saba ===
In:

No.	Pos.	Nation	Player
—	GK	ISR	Yigal Becker (from Hapoel Tel Aviv)
—	DF	MDA	Artur Crăciun (from (Hungary) Budapest Honvéd)
—	DF	ISR	Shahar Rosen (from Maccabi Tel Aviv, previously loaned to Beitar Tel Aviv Bat Yam)
—	DF	ISR	Tom Shelach (Free transfer)
—	DF	ISR	Ben Hayun (loan return from F.C. Tzeirei Tayibe)
—	DF	ISR	Ayman Ali (on loan from Hapoel Tel Aviv)
—	MF	GAM	Abubakar Barry (from Hapoel Ramat HaSharon)
—	MF	ISR	Awajo Asefa (from Hapoel Hadera)
—	MF	ISR	Elian Rohana (from Maccabi Ahi Nazareth)
—	MF	ISR	Ohad Hazut (from Maccabi Ahi Nazareth)
—	FW	ISR	Uziel Pardo (from Beitar Jerusalem)
—	FW	ISR	Hayford Adjei (on loan from F.C. Ashdod)
—	FW	ISR	Gal Katabi (on loan from Maccabi Haifa)
—	FW	ISR	Danny Amer (from Hapoel Umm al-Fahm)
—	FW	NGA	Odah Marshall (from Hapoel Umm al-Fahm)

Out:

No.	Pos.	Nation	Player
—	GK	ISR	Matan Zalmanovic (to Hapoel Ashdod)
—	GK	ISR	Itay Sahar (on loan to Hapoel Herzliya)
—	GK	ISR	Roy Beigel (to Maccabi Sha'arayim)
—	DF	GUA	Matan Peleg (to Hapoel Petah Tikva)
—	DF	ISR	Uri Magbo (to Sektzia Ness Ziona)
—	DF	ISR	Tal Makhlouf (to Hapoel Ashdod)
—	DF	ISR	Yonatan Levi (to Hapoel Nof HaGalil)
—	DF	ISR	Eitan Ratzon (Free agent)
—	MF	ISR	Yuval Haliva (to Hapoel Rishon LeZion)
—	MF	BUL	Yoni Stoyanov (to Hapoel Be'er Sheva)
—	MF	ISR	Alon Sabag (Free agent)
—	MF	ISR	Evyatar Mizrahi (to Maccabi Ironi Ashdod)
—	MF	ISR	Daniel Schwarzboim (to Maccabi Herzliya)
—	MF	ISR	Gal Shalhevet (Free agent)
—	FW	ISR	Gil Itzhak (to Maccabi Netanya)
—	FW	ISR	Omer Buaron (to Hapoel Ra'anana)
—	FW	ISR	Walid Darwish (to Bnei Sakhnin)
—	FW	ISR	Amit Yeverbaum (to Hapoel Hadera)
—	FW	ISR	Alon Buzorgi (Free agent)

=== Hapoel Nof HaGalil ===
In:

No.	Pos.	Nation	Player
—	GK	ISR	Sagi Malul (loan return from Maccabi Ahi Nazareth)
—	GK	ISR	Doron Michaeli (loan return from F.C. Tzeirei Kafr Kanna)
—	GK	ISR	Amit Keren (from Hapoel Be'er Sheva)
—	GK	ISR	Barak Levi (from Hapoel Ra'anana)
—	DF	ISR	Yuval Levin (on loan from Ironi Kiryat Shmona)
—	DF	ISR	Bar Ivgi (from Ironi Tiberias)
—	DF	ISR	Yonatan Levi (from Hapoel Kfar Saba)
—	DF	ISR	Ori Tza'adon (from Hapoel Rishon LeZion)
—	MF	ISR	Amit Mor (from Hapoel Hadera)
—	MF	GNB	João Jaquité (from (Portugal) Vilafranquense)
—	MF	ISR	Samir Farhud (loan return from F.C. Tzeirei Kafr Kanna)
—	MF	ISR	Nevo Shedo (on loan from Maccabi Haifa)
—	MF	ISR	Ryan Ashmuz (loan return from Hapoel Bnei Zalafa)
—	MF	ISR	Guy Dayan (from Hapoel Qalansawe)
—	MF	ISR	Daniel Twizer (from Hapoel Ra'anana)
—	FW	ISR	Moti Malka (from F.C. Kafr Qasim)
—	FW	GHA	Alfred Mensah (from (Albania) Skënderbeu)
—	FW	AUS	Jordan Swibel (from (Australia) Western Sydney Wanderers)
—	FW	ISR	Dudu Alterovich (on loan from Hapoel Haifa)

Out:

No.	Pos.	Nation	Player
—	GK	ISR	Matan Ambar (to Hapoel Ramat Gan)
—	GK	NZL	Stefan Marinovic (to Hapoel Tel Aviv)
—	DF	ISR	Wesam Rabah (to Hapoel Umm al-Fahm)
—	DF	ISR	Reuven Gal (Retired)
—	DF	CMR	Ernest Mabouka (Free agent)
—	DF	ISR	Eli Balilty (to Ironi Tiberias)
—	DF	ISR	Hagay Goldenberg (to Beitar Jerusalem)
—	DF	ISR	Tom Skolvin (to Maccabi Ata Bialik)
—	MF	NGA	John Ogu (to Maccabi Jaffa)
—	MF	ISR	Omer Fadida (to Maccabi Petah Tikva)
—	MF	ISR	Bar Cohen (to Beitar Jerusalem, his player card still belongs to Maccabi Tel Aviv)
—	MF	ISR	Timothy Muzie (to Ironi Kiryat Shmona, his player card still belongs to Maccabi Haifa)
—	MF	ISR	Shon Weiss (to Hapoel Ashdod)
—	FW	ISR	Abdallah Khlaikhal (to F.C. Kafr Qasim, previously loaned to (United Arab Emirates) Al-Nasr)
—	FW	ISR	Stav Nahmani (to Beitar Jerusalem, his player card still belongs to Maccabi Haifa)
—	FW	UGA	Luwagga Kizito (to (Azerbaijan) Sabail)
—	FW	ISR	Ronen Hanchis (to Beitar Jerusalem, his player card still belongs to Maccabi Tel Aviv)
—	FW	BRA	Mateus Lima (to (Uzbekistan) Nasaf Qarshi, previously loaned to Hapoel Rishon LeZion)

=== Hapoel Petah Tikva ===
In:

No.	Pos.	Nation	Player
—	DF	GUA	Matan Peleg (from Hapoel Kfar Saba)
—	DF	ISR	Bar Natanel (from F.C. Ashdod)
—	DF	ISR	Ron Ben Dakon (loan return from Hapoel Ramat HaSharon)
—	DF	ISR	Ofek Fishler (from Hapoel Haifa, previously loaned)
—	DF	HAI	Djimy Alexis (from Sektzia Ness Ziona)
—	DF	ISR	Dror Nir (from F.C. Kafr Qasim)
—	MF	ISR	Niv Berkovich (on loan from Maccabi Tel Aviv)
—	FW	ISR	Raz Stain (from Bnei Sakhnin)
—	FW	ISR	Idan Shemesh (frm Hapoel Umm al-Fahm)
—	FW	ISR	Bar Nawi (from Hapoel Hadera)

Out:

No.	Pos.	Nation	Player
—	DF	ISR	Aviv Salem (to Bnei Yehuda)
—	DF	ISR	Viki Kahlon (to Ironi Tiberias)
—	DF	ISR	Omer Korsia (to (Cyprus) Enosis Neon Paralimni)
—	DF	ISR	Bar Netanel (to Hapoel Rishon LeZion)
—	DF	ISR	Ron Ben Dakon (on loan to Hapoel Ramat HaSharon)
—	MF	ISR	Ilay Tamam (to Hapoel Rishon LeZion)
—	FW	NGA	Peter Onyekachi (Free agent)

=== Hapoel Ramat Gan ===
In:

No.	Pos.	Nation	Player
—	GK	ISR	Matan Ambar (from Hapoel Nof HaGalil)
—	DF	ISR	Niran Rotshtein (from Hapoel Ashdod)
—	DF	ISR	Osher Abu (from Hapoel Ashdod)
—	DF	ISR	Ali Kayal (from Hapoel Haifa)
—	DF	ISR	Ofer Verta (from Hapoel Ashdod)
—	DF	ISR	Matan Levi (on loan from Maccabi Netanya)
—	MF	ISR	Bentzi Moshel (from Hapoel Ashdod)
—	MF	ISR	Raz Cohen (from Hapoel Afula)
—	MF	ISR	Omer Lakao (from Beitar Jerusalem)
—	MF	CMR	Martin Atemengue (on loan from F.C. Ashdod)
—	MF	ISR	Or Dasa (Free transfer)
—	FW	ISR	Ben Mizan (from F.C. Ashdod)
—	FW	ISR	Michael Maman (from Hapoel Umm al-Fahm)
—	FW	ISR	Liran Elmaliah (on loan from Hapoel Jerusalem)
—	FW	ISR	Hamza Mawassi (from Hapoel Ashdod)
—	FW	SUR	Gleofilo Vlijter (from Beitar Jerusalem)

Out:

No.	Pos.	Nation	Player
—	GK	ISR	Ivan Greenberg (Fre agent)
—	DF	ISR	Itay Ozeri (to Maccabi Petah Tikva)
—	DF	ISR	Ofir Benbenisti (to Ironi Kiryat Shmona, previously loaned to Hapoel Umm al-Fahm)
—	DF	ISR	Idan Cohen (to Maccabi Petah Tikva)
—	DF	ISR	Paz Ben Ari (to Hapoel Kfar Shalem)
—	MF	ISR	Eylon Yerushalmi (to Sektzia Ness Ziona)
—	MF	ISR	Yossi Tuava (to F.C. Dimona)
—	MF	ISR	Saher Taji (to Bnei Sakhnin)
—	MF	ISR	Dor Edri (to F.C. Kafr Qasim)
—	MF	ISR	Omer Barami (to Beitar Tel Aviv Bat Yam)
—	FW	ISR	Roy Korine (loan return to Maccabi Netanya)
—	FW	ISR	Tom Berkovic (to Hapoel Hadera)
—	FW	CIV	Zie Yohou Boris (Free agent)

=== Hapoel Ramat HaSharon ===
In:

No.	Pos.	Nation	Player
—	GK	ISR	Golan Elkaslasy (from Maccabi Bnei Reineh)
—	DF	ISR	Yarin Hassan (Free transfer)
—	DF	ISR	Itay Ben Hemo (on loan from Maccabi Tel Aviv)
—	DF	ISR	Amit Bohadana (from Ironi Modi'in)
—	DF	ISR	Itamar Guri (on loan from Maccabi Haifa)
—	DF	ISR	Ron Ben Dakon (on loan from Hapoel Petah Tikva)
—	MF	ISR	Ben Reichert (from Bnei Yehuda)
—	MF	ISR	Guy Shetah (from Maccabi Yavne)
—	FW	ISR	Aner Shechter (from Maccabi Herzliya)
—	FW	ISR	David Dego (from Beitar Jerusalem)
—	FW	ISR	Netanel Hagani (on loan from Hapoel Be'er Sheva)
—	FW	ISR	Netanel Askias (on loan from Hapoel Be'er Sheva)
—	FW	ISR	Eyal Abadi (on loan from Maccabi Netanya)

Out:

No.	Pos.	Nation	Player
—	DF	ISR	Ovadia Darwish (to Bnei Sakhnin)
—	DF	ISR	Ohad Elbilia (to Hapoel Ra'anana)
—	DF	ISR	Francisco Dutari (Free agent)
—	DF	ISR	Roy Amos (to Hapoel Ashdod)
—	DF	ISR	Ron Ben Dakon (loan return to Hapoel Petah Tikva)
—	MF	GAM	Abubakar Barry (to Hapoel Kfar Saba)
—	MF	ISR	Naftali Belay (loan return to Maccabi Netanya)
—	MF	ISR	Guy Sivilia (to Bnei Yehuda)
—	MF	ISR	Tal Levi (on loan to Ironi Modi'in)
—	MF	ISR	Amit Magoz (Free agent)
—	MF	ISR	Yossi Mekonen (Free agent)
—	FW	ISR	Elior Mishali (to Hapoel Kfar Shalem)
—	FW	ISR	Ohad Barzilay (to Hpaoel Rishon LeZion)
—	FW	ISR	Roy Ronen (to Hapoel Afula)
—	FW	ISR	Yehonathan Levy (to (Cyprus) Enosis Neon Paralimni)
—	FW	ISR	Aner Shechter (to Hapoel Marmorek)

=== Hapoel Rishon LeZion ===
In:

No.	Pos.	Nation	Player
—	GK	ISR	Avihay Dahan (from Beitar Tel Aviv Bat Yam)
—	DF	ISR	Mor Edri (from F.C. Ashdod)
—	DF	ISR	Adir Rotshtein (from Hapoel Herzliya)
—	DF	ISR	Raz Baruchian (on loan from Beitar Jerusalem)
—	DF	ISR	Bar Netanel (from Hapoel Petah Tikva)
—	MF	ISR	Zion Tzemah (from Hapoel Ashkelon)
—	MF	SLE	Emmanuel Samadia (from Hapoel Umm al-Fahm)
—	MF	ISR	Ilay Tamam (from Hapoel Petah Tikva)
—	MF	ISR	Yuval Haliva (from Hapoel Kfar Saba)
—	FW	SLE	Alpha Conteh (from Hapoel Umm al-Fahm)
—	FW	ISR	Ohad Barzilay (from Hapoel Ramat HaSharon)

Out:

No.	Pos.	Nation	Player
—	GK	ISR	Ben Vaitzman (to F.C. Tira)
—	DF	ISR	Adi Nimni (to F.C. Tira)
—	DF	CIV	Abou Dosso (to Hapoel Tel Aviv)
—	DF	ISR	Ori Tza'adon (to Hapoel Nof HaGalil)
—	DF	ISR	Roey Azut (to F.C. Dimona, his player card still belongs to Hapoel Be'er Sheva)
—	DF	ISR	Shahar Barnea (to Beitar Tel Aviv Bat Yam, his player card still belongs to Maccabi Petah Tikva)
—	MF	ISR	Vladimir Broun (to F.C. Tira)
—	MF	ISR	Dan Kaduri (loan return to Maccabi Petah Tikva)
—	MF	ISR	Ariel Lazmi (to Maccabi Ironi Ashdod)
—	MF	ISR	Shay Balahssan (to Maccabi Jaffa, his player card still belongs to Maccabi Tel Aviv)
—	MF	ISR	Itay Levi (to Maccabi Sha'arayim)
—	MF	ISR	Yaniv Segev (Free agent)
—	MF	ISR	Sean Malka (to Hapoel Kfar Shalem)
—	MF	ISR	Dolev Balulu (Free agent)
—	FW	BRA	Mateus Lima (to (Uzbekistan) Nasaf Qarshi, previously loaned from Hapoel Nof HaGalil)
—	FW	PLE	Fadi Zidan (to (Bahrain) Al-Hidd)
—	FW	ISR	Netanel Askias (to Hapoel Ramat HaSharon, his player card still belongs to Hapoel Be'er Sheva)

=== Hapoel Umm al-Fahm ===
In:

No.	Pos.	Nation	Player
—	GK	ISR	Tal Bomshtein (from Hapoel Haifa)
—	DF	BRA	Marcus Diniz (from Maccabi Petah Tikva)
—	DF	ISR	Wesam Rabah (from Hapoel Nof HaGalil)
—	DF	ISR	Kobi Mor (from Sektzia Ness Ziona)
—	MF	ISR	Reef Mesika (from Maccabi Bnei Reineh)
—	MF	ISR	Solomon Daniel (from Hapoel Jerusalem)
—	MF	ISR	Bashir Bajhat (from Bnei Sakhnin)
—	MF	COL	Sebastián Velásquez (from (United States) El Paso Locomotive)
—	MF	ISR	Ahmed Rabia (from F.C. Tzeirei Tayibe)
—	FW	NGA	Odah Marshall (from Bnei Sakhnin)
—	FW	ISR	Anas Mahamid (from (Switzerland) Winterthur)
—	FW	ISR	Michael Maman (from Hapoel Ramat Gan)
—	FW	ISR	Lior Inbrum (from F.C. Ashdod, previously loaned to Maccabi Petah Tikva F.C.)
—	FW	ISR	Samah Mar'ab (from F.C. Kafr Qasim)

Out:

No.	Pos.	Nation	Player
—	GK	ISR	Tomer Livitanov (to Ironi Tiberias)
—	GK	ISR	Amer Jabarin (Free agent)
—	DF	ISR	Nadav Muniss (to Hapoel Marmorek)
—	DF	ISR	Ofir Benbenisti (to Ironi Kiryat Shmona, previously loaned from Hapoel Ramat Gan)
—	MF	ISR	Amir Lavi (to Hapoel Ra'anana)
—	MF	ISR	Bar Yeruham (to Maccabi Yavne)
—	MF	ISR	Yam Cohen (to Hapoel Ashdod)
—	MF	BRA	Pedro Sass (to Hapoel Ashdod)
—	MF	SLE	Emmanuel Samadia (to Hapoel Rishon LeZion)
—	FW	ISR	Idan Shemesh (to Hapoel Petah Tikva)
—	FW	ISR	Guy Dahan (to (Austria) Rheindorf Altach, previously loaned from Maccabi Haifa)
—	FW	ISR	Danny Amer (to Maccabi Ahi Nazareth)
—	FW	SLE	Alpha Conteh (to Hapoel Rishon LeZion)
—	FW	NGA	Odah Marshall (to Hapoel Kfar Saba)

=== Ironi Tiberias ===
In:

No.	Pos.	Nation	Player
—	GK	ISR	Tomer Livitanov (from Hapoel Umm al-Fahm)
—	GK	ISR	Daniel Benish (from Hapoel Ra'anana)
—	DF	ISR	Eli Balilty (from Hapoel Nof HaGalil)
—	DF	ISR	Yakov Ababa (from Maccabi Bnei Reineh)
—	DF	ISR	Viki Kahlon (from Hapoel Petah Tikva)
—	DF	ISR	Ben Vehava (from Hapoel Haifa)
—	MF	ISR	Matanel Tadesa (from Maccabi Bnei Reineh)
—	MF	GHA	Gershon Koffie (from (Poland) Sandecja Nowy Sącz)
—	MF	GUI	Boubacar Fofana (from (Romania) Sepsi OSK)
—	MF	ISR	Bassel Shaban (loan return from Maccabi Tzur Shalom)
—	MF	ISR	Snir Talias (on loan from Hapoel Haifa)
—	FW	BRA	Julio César (from Maccabi Bnei Reineh)
—	FW	ISR	Eliran Milestein (from Hapoel Herzliya)

Out:

No.	Pos.	Nation	Player
—	GK	ISR	Assaf Raz (to Tzeirei Tayibe)
—	DF	ISR	Bar Ivgi (to Hapoel Nof HaGalil)
—	DF	ISR	Israel Rosh (to Hapoel Ra'anana)
—	DF	ISR	Abdi Farhat (to Hapoel Qalansawe)
—	MF	ISR	Ran Rol (to Tzeirei Tayibe)
—	MF	ISR	Mustapha Sheikh Yousef (to Hapoel Qalansawe)
—	MF	GUI	Boubacar Fofana (Free agent)
—	MF	ISR	Hen Yad'an (Free agent)
—	FW	ISR	Assi Guma (to Tzeirei Tayibe)
—	FW	ISR	Firas Ganayem (to Hapoel Bnei Zalafa)

=== Maccabi Ahi Nazareth ===
In:

No.	Pos.	Nation	Player
—	GK	ISR	Dan Drori (on loan from Hapoel Kfar Saba)
—	DF	ISR	Atef Musa (from Maccabi Bnei Reineh)
—	DF	ISR	Nitay Bitan (from Beitar Tel Aviv Bat Yam)
—	DF	ISR	Erez Isakov (from Ironi Kiryat Shmona)
—	DF	ISR	Amir Rustum (from Bnei Yehuda)
—	MF	CIV	Alfa Mamadou Diané (from (Libya) Al-Sadaqa)
—	MF	ISR	Mohammed Gadir (from Maccabi Haifa)
—	MF	ISR	Jay Livne (from Hapoel Afula)
—	MF	ISR	Ohad Hazut (from Hapoel Kfar Saba)
—	MF	ISR	Yarin Gavri (on loan from Hapoel Haifa)
—	FW	CMR	Rodrigue Bongongui (from (Slovenia) Tabor Sežana)
—	FW	NGA	Benjamin Kuku (from Maccabi Bnei Reineh)
—	FW	ISR	Ali Kna'ana (from Maccabi Bnei Reineh)
—	FW	ISR	Noaf Bazea (from F.C. Ashdod)
—	FW	ISR	Raphael de la Sousa (Free transfer)

Out:

No.	Pos.	Nation	Player
—	GK	ISR	Sagi Malul (loan return to Hapoel Nof HaGalil)
—	DF	ISR	Tarek Boshnak (to Hapoel Hadera)
—	DF	ISR	Itzik Shoolmayster (loan return to Hapoel Tel Aviv)
—	DF	ISR	Tomer Lebanon (to T.Z. Tzeirei Kafr Kanna)
—	DF	ISR	Yam Zadock Hacker (Free agent)
—	MF	GRE	Timis Bardis (to (Greece) Ialysos)
—	MF	ISR	Ohad Hazut (to Hapoel Kfar Saba)
—	MF	ISR	Elian Rohana (to Hapoel Kfar Saba)
—	MF	ISR	Tomer Lebanon (Free agent)
—	MF	ISR	Sfouan Hilo (Free agent)
—	MF	BRA	Macula (to (Malta) Marsa)
—	FW	ISR	Ahmed Abed (to Maccabi Bnei Reineh)
—	FW	ISR	Mahran Lala (to Maccabi Isfiya)
—	FW	ISR	Rotem Haguel (Free agent)

=== Maccabi Jaffa ===
In:

No.	Pos.	Nation	Player
—	GK	ISR	Gal Navon (from Hapoel Ashdod)
—	DF	ISR	Liel Biton (from Hapoel Ashdod)
—	DF	ISR	Guy Mishpati (from Hapoel Haifa)
—	DF	ISR	Itzik Shoolmayster (from Hapoel Tel Aviv)
—	DF	ISR	Bar Shuhsan (on loan from Hapoel Jerusalem)
—	MF	NGA	John Ogu (from Hapoel Nof HaGalil)
—	MF	ISR	Shay Balahssan (on loan from Maccabi Tel Aviv)
—	MF	ISR	Bar Meir (on loan from F.C. Ashdod)
—	FW	ISR	Tal Ayela (from F.C. Tzeirei Tayibe)
—	FW	ISR	Daniel Agami (from Shimshon Kafr Qasim)
—	FW	POR	Jucie Lupeta (from (Romania) Botoșani)

Out:

No.	Pos.	Nation	Player
—	DF	ISR	Meir Ohayon (to F.C. Jerusalem)
—	DF	ISR	Omri Cohen (Free agent)
—	MF	ISR	Liel Cohen (to Maccabi Ironi Ashdod)
—	MF	ISR	Eran Levi (to Hapoel Ra'anana)
—	FW	ISR	Nati Arzuan (Free agent)
—	FW	ISR	Daniel Agami (Free agent)

=== Maccabi Petah Tikva ===
In:

No.	Pos.	Nation	Player
—	GK	ISR	Danny Amos (from Maccabi Netanya)
—	DF	ISR	Itay Ozeri (from Hapoel Ramat Gan)
—	DF	ISR	Idan Cohen (from Hapoel Ramat Gan)
—	DF	CRO	Branko Vrgoč (from (Greece) Panetolikos)
—	DF	ISR	Gal Kolani (from Hapoel Acre)
—	MF	ISR	Omer Fadida (from Hapoel Nof HaGalil)
—	MF	ISR	Dan Kaduri (loan return from Hapoel Rishon LeZion)
—	MF	GHA	Gideon Akaouwa (from F.C. Kafr Qasim)
—	MF	ISR	Moti Barshazki (from F.C. Ashdod)
—	FW	ISR	Dudu Biton (from Sektzia Ness Ziona)
—	FW	ISR	Tal Ben Haim (from Maccabi Tel Aviv)
—	FW	BLR	Ilya Shkurin (loan from (Russia) CSKA Moscow)

Out:

No.	Pos.	Nation	Player
—	GK	ISR	Arik Yanko (to Maccabi Bnei Reineh)
—	GK	ISR	Ziv Cohen (to Hapoel Kfar Shalem)
—	DF	BRA	Marcus Diniz (to Hapoel Umm al-Fahm)
—	DF	ISR	Inon Eliyahu (to Maccabi Haifa)
—	DF	BIH	Adi Mehremić (loan return to (Poland) Wisła Kraków)
—	DF	ISR	Dor Elo (to Hapoel Tel Aviv)
—	DF	ISR	Daniel Felczer (to Bnei Yehuda)
—	MF	ISR	Amit Meir (to Hapoel Haifa)
—	MF	ISR	Yoav Hofmayster (to Ironi Kiryat Shmona, previously loaned from (Austria) LASK)
—	MF	ISR	Ido Shahar (to (Cyprus) Apollon Limassol, his player card still belongs to Maccabi Tel Aviv)
—	MF	ISR	Moshe Meir (on loan to Hapoel Ashdod)
—	MF	ISR	Nico Olsak (to Hapoel Hadera)
—	MF	ZAM	Lameck Banda (to (Italy) Lecce)
—	FW	NGA	James Adeniyi (to (Turkey) Tuzlaspor)
—	FW	CIV	Aboubacar Doumbia (to (Cyprus) Karmiotissa, his player card still belongs to Maccabi Netanya)
—	FW	ISR	Lior Inbrum (to Hapoel Umm al-Fahm, his player card still belongs to F.C. Ashdod)
—	FW	ISR	Dor Jan (to F.C. Ashdod, previously loaned from (Portugal) Paços de Ferreira)
—	FW	ISR	Mohammed Awaed (to Bnei Sakhnin, previously loaned from Maccabi Haifa)
