= List of Israeli football transfers winter 2021–22 =

This is a list of Israeli football transfers for the 2021–22 Winter Transfer Window.

== Ligat Ha'Al ==
=== Beitar Jerusalem ===
In:

No.	Pos.	Nation	Player
—	MF	ISR	Dan Azaria (from Hapoel Kfar Saba)

Out:

No.	Pos.	Nation	Player
—	DF	ISR	Raz Baruchian (on loan to Beitar Nordia Jerusalem)
—	MF	BRA	Matheusinho (to (Brazil) América Mineiro, previously loaned to F.C. Ashdod)
—	MF	MNE	Marko Janković (to Hapoel Tel Aviv)
—	MF	GHA	Edwin Gyasi (Free agent)

=== Bnei Sakhnin ===
In:

No.	Pos.	Nation	Player
—	DF	NED	Fabian Sporkslede (from (Georgia (country)) Dinamo Tbilisi)
—	MF	ISR	Roei Shukrani (from Hapoel Nof HaGalil)
—	FW	UGA	Fahad Bayo (on loan from F.C. Ashdod)
—	FW	NGA	Odah Marshall (from (Turkey) Boluspor)

Out:

No.	Pos.	Nation	Player
—	DF	SRB	Nikola Ćirković (to F.C. Kafr Qasim)
—	DF	ISR	Hagay Goldenberg (to Hapoel Nof HaGalil)
—	MF	ISR	Nir Lax (to Hapoel Nof HaGalil)
—	MF	ISR	Moti Barshazki (to F.C. Ashdod)

=== F.C. Ashdod ===
In:

No.	Pos.	Nation	Player
—	DF	ISR	George Diba (from Hapoel Tel Aviv)
—	MF	ISR	Moti Barshazki (from Bnei Sakhnin)
—	FW	GRE	Dimitrios Diamantakos (on loan from Hajduk Split)
—	FW	ISR	Ben Mizan (from Hapoel Jerusalem)

Out:

No.	Pos.	Nation	Player
—	DF	ISR	Shay Ben David (to Hapoel Kfar Saba, his player card still belongs to Maccabi Haifa)
—	MF	ISR	Amir Agayev (to Maccabi Bnei Reineh)
—	FW	UGA	Fahad Bayo (on loan to Bnei Sakhnin)

=== Hapoel Be'er Sheva ===
In:

No.	Pos.	Nation	Player
—	MF	POR	André Martins (from (Poland) Legia Warsaw)

Out:

No.	Pos.	Nation	Player
—	FW	ISR	Abdallah Abu Abed (on loan to Hapoel Marmorek)

=== Hapoel Hadera ===
In:

No.	Pos.	Nation	Player
—	FW	NGA	Steven Alfred (from (Belarus) Slutsk)

Out:

No.	Pos.	Nation	Player
—	DF	ISR	Wesam Rabah (to Hapoel Nof HaGalil)
—	FW	ISR	Roei Zikri (to Hapoel Petah Tikva)
—	FW	ISR	Mohammed Rabiya (on loan to F.C. Dimona)

=== Hapoel Haifa ===
In:

No.	Pos.	Nation	Player
—	MF	SRB	Matija Ljujić (from (South Korea) Gangwon FC)

Out:

No.	Pos.	Nation	Player
—	GK	ISR	Amit Suiri (on loan to Hapoel Acre)
—	MF	FRA	Kevin Tapoko (on loan to (Bulgaria) Beroe Stara Zagora)

=== Hapoel Jerusalem ===
In:

No.	Pos.	Nation	Player
—	GK	ISR	Aviram Ziat (from Hapoel Baqa al-Gharbiyye)
—	MF	ISR	Solomon Daniel (from Hapoel Nof HaGalil)
—	MF	ISR	Ofek Bitton (on loan from Hapoel Tel Aviv)
—	FW	PAN	Eduardo Guerrero (on loan from Maccabi Tel Aviv)

Out:

No.	Pos.	Nation	Player
—	DF	ISR	Ihab Shami (to Hapoel Umm al-Fahm)
—	DF	ISR	Bar Shushan (on loan to Shimshon Tel Aviv)
—	MF	NGA	Hamed Sholaja (on loan to Beitar Tel Aviv Bat Yam)
—	MF	GHA	Cletus Nombil (on loan to Hapoel Kfar Saba)
—	FW	ISR	Ahmed Darawshe (to Hapoel Acre)
—	FW	ISR	Ben Mizan (to F.C. Ashdod)
—	FW	ISR	Idan Shemesh (to Hapoel Umm al-Fahm)

=== Hapoel Nof HaGalil ===
In:

No.	Pos.	Nation	Player
—	DF	ISR	Hagay Goldenberg (from Bnei Sakhnin)
—	DF	CMR	Ernest Mabouka (Free transfer)
—	DF	ISR	Wesam Rabah (from Hapoel Hadera)
—	MF	LBR	David Tweh (from (Belarus) Rukh Brest)
—	MF	ISR	Nir Lax (from Bnei Sakhnin)
—	MF	NGA	John Ogu (Free transfer)
—	FW	ISR	Ronen Hanchis (on loan from Maccabi Tel Aviv)
—	FW	ISR	Abdallah Khlaikhal (on loan from (United Arab Emirates) Al-Nasr SC)

Out:

No.	Pos.	Nation	Player
—	DF	GHA	David Acquah (to Hapoel Afula, his player card still belongs to Maccabi Haifa)
—	DF	ISR	Yarin Peretz (to Beitar Tel Aviv Bat Yam)
—	DF	ISR	Viki Kahlon (to Hapoel Petah Tikva)
—	DF	ISR	Itay Arazi (on loan to Hapoel Kaukab)
—	MF	ISR	Solomon Daniel (to Hapoel Jerusalem)
—	MF	BRA	Pedro Sass (to Hapoel Umm al-Fahm)
—	MF	ISR	Roei Shukrani (to Bnei Sakhnin)
—	MF	ISR	Ben Sterling (to Hapoel Bu'eine, his player card still belongs to Hapoel Haifa)
—	MF	ISR	Yaniv Segev (to Hapoel Rishon LeZion)
—	MF	ISR	Elad Shahaf (to F.C. Kafr Qasim)
—	FW	JAM	Kevaughn Frater (to Hapoel Ra'anana)
—	FW	ISR	Moti Malka (to F.C. Kafr Qasim)

=== Hapoel Tel Aviv ===
In:

No.	Pos.	Nation	Player
—	GK	UKR	Bohdan Sarnavskyi (on loan from (Ukraine) Dnipro-1)
—	DF	ISR	Tom Ahi Mordechai (loan return from Hapoel Ramat HaSharon)
—	MF	MNE	Marko Janković (from Beitar Jerusalem)
—	MF	FRA	Ange-Freddy Plumain (on loan from (Ukraine) Rukh Lviv)

Out:

No.	Pos.	Nation	Player
—	DF	ISR	George Diba (to F.C. Ashdod)
—	MF	ISR	Yoav Hofmayster (to Maccabi Petah Tikva)
—	MF	ISR	Ofek Bitton (on loan to Hapoel Jerusalem)
—	FW	BRA	Lúcio Maranhão (to Bnei Yehuda)
—	FW	ISR	Ofek Ovadia (on loan to Beitar Tel Aviv Bat Yam)
—	FW	ISR	Ali Knaana (to Maccabi Bnei Reineh)
—	FW	BRA	Farley Rosa (to (China) Tianjin Jinmen Tiger)

=== Ironi Kiryat Shmona ===
In:

No.	Pos.	Nation	Player
—	DF	ISR	Erez Isakov (from Bnei Yehuda)
—	MF	SVK	Július Szöke (from (Belarus) Shakhtyor Soligorsk)
—	FW	BRA	Willie (from (Bolivia) The Strongest)

Out:

No.	Pos.	Nation	Player
—	DF	CIV	Stephane Acka (Free agent)
—	MF	ROU	Ovidiu Bic (loan return to (Romania) Universitatea Craiova)
—	FW	MNE	Stefan Milošević (to (Montenegro) Budućnost Podgorica)
—	FW	ISR	Ron Perets (on loan to Hapoel Bu'eine)

=== Maccabi Haifa ===
In:

No.	Pos.	Nation	Player
—	DF	GLP	Mickaël Alphonse (from (France) Amiens)
—	FW	CGO	Mavis Tchibota (from (Bulgaria) Ludogorets Razgrad)

Out:

No.	Pos.	Nation	Player
—	DF	ISR	Roey Elimelech (on loan to Hapoel Afula)
—	DF	ISR	Adar Azruel (on loan to Hapoel Ra'anana)
—	MF	ISR	Yuval Ashkenazi (to Maccabi Netanya)
—	FW	ISR	Liroy Gabay (to Maccabi Netanya)

=== Maccabi Netanya ===
In:

No.	Pos.	Nation	Player
—	DF	BUL	Plamen Galabov (from (Bulgaria) CSKA Sofia)
—	MF	ISR	Yuval Ashkenazi (from Maccabi Haifa)
—	FW	ISR	Liroy Gabay (from Maccabi Haifa)
—	FW	GHA	Patrick Twumasi (from (Germany) Hannover 96)

Out:

No.	Pos.	Nation	Player
—	DF	ISR	Eyas Masalha (to Hapoel Rishon LeZion)
—	MF	ISR	Shalom Edri (to F.C. Tira)
—	MF	ISR	Naftali Belay (on loan to Hapoel Ramat HaSharon)
—	MF	ISR	Almog Cohen (Retired)
—	FW	ISR	Mamoon Qashoua (to F.C. Tira)
—	FW	CIV	Aboubacar Doumbia (on loan to Maccabi Petah Tikva)

=== Maccabi Petah Tikva ===
In:

No.	Pos.	Nation	Player
—	DF	BIH	Adi Mehremić (on loan from (Poland) Wisła Kraków)
—	MF	ISR	Ido Shahar (on loan from Maccabi Tel Aviv)
—	MF	ISR	Yoav Hofmayster (from Hapoel Tel Aviv)
—	FW	MDA	Ion Nicolaescu (on loan from (Slovakia) DAC 1904)
—	FW	CIV	Aboubacar Doumbia (on loan from Maccabi Netanya)

Out:

No.	Pos.	Nation	Player
—	DF	ISR	Daniel Busi (to Sektzia Nes Tziona)
—	MF	ISR	Ben Reichert (to Bnei Yehuda)
—	MF	SVK	Jaroslav Mihalik (to (Slovakia) FK Pohronie)
—	FW	CIV	Allasana Doumbia (Free agent)
—	FW	ISR	Roy Ronen (to Hapoel Ramat HaSharon)

=== Maccabi Tel Aviv ===
In:

No.	Pos.	Nation	Player
—	DF	POR	Josué Sá (on loan from (Bulgaria) Ludogorets Razgrad)
—	FW	SRB	Đorđe Jovanović (from (Serbia) Čukarički)

Out:

No.	Pos.	Nation	Player
—	DF	ESP	Luis Hernández (to (Spain) Cádiz)
—	FW	ISR	Ronen Hanchis (on loan to Hapoel Nof HaGalil)
—	FW	PAN	Eduardo Guerrero (on loan to Hapoel Jerusalem)

== Ligat Lemuit ==
=== Beitar Tel Aviv Bat Yam ===
In:

No.	Pos.	Nation	Player
—	DF	ISR	Dalalay Ambao (from Maccabi Ironi Ashdod)
—	DF	ISR	Yarin Peretz (from Hapoel Nof HaGalil)
—	DF	ISR	Mor Edri (on loan from F.C. Ashdod)
—	MF	ISR	Gal Levi (Free transfer)
—	MF	NGA	Hamed Sholaja (on loan from Hapoel Jerusalem)
—	MF	ISR	Shay Golan (from Hapoel Rishon LeZion)
—	FW	ISR	Eden Hershkovitz (on loan from Hapoel Tel Aviv)
—	FW	ISR	Ofek Ovadia (on loan from Hapoel Tel Aviv)

Out:

No.	Pos.	Nation	Player
—	DF	ISR	Nehoray Bitton (to Maccabi Ironi Ashdod, his player card still belongs to Maccabi Tel Aviv)
—	MF	ISR	Matan Maman (on loan to F.C. Ramla)
—	MF	ISR	Omri Ran (to Hapoel Bik'at HaYarden, his player card still belongs to Maccabi Tel Aviv)
—	FW	ISR	Amit Malka (to Hapoel Kfar Shalem)
—	FW	ISR	Shay Balhassen (to Hapoel Rishon LeZion, his player card still belongs to Maccabi Tel Aviv)
—	FW	ISR	Yahli Lazar (to Hapoel Bik'at HaYarden, his player card still belongs to Maccabi Tel Aviv)

=== Bnei Yehuda ===
In:

No.	Pos.	Nation	Player
—	DF	ISR	Manamto Asefa (from Free transfer)
—	MF	ISR	Ben Reichert (from Maccabi Petah Tikva)
—	MF	POR	Tomás Podstawski (from (Norway) Stabæk)
—	FW	BRA	Lúcio Maranhão (from Hapoel Tel Aviv)

Out:

No.	Pos.	Nation	Player
—	DF	ISR	Erez Isakov (Ironi Kiryat Shmona)
—	DF	ISR	Yakir Shaul (Hapoel Herzliya)
—	MF	ISR	Emil Edri (on loan to Hapoel Marmorek)
—	MF	ISR	Shay Mazor (to Sektzia Nes Tziona)

=== F.C. Kafr Qasim ===
In:

No.	Pos.	Nation	Player
—	DF	SRB	Nikola Ćirković (from Bnei Sakhnin)
—	MF	ISR	Elad Shahaf (from Hapoel Nof HaGalil)
—	FW	ISR	Hassan Alaa A-Din (Free transfer)
—	FW	ISR	Moti Malka (on loan from Hapoel Nof HaGalil)

Out:

No.	Pos.	Nation	Player
—	MF	ISR	Phillip Maneh (to Maccabi Bnei Reineh)
—	FW	ISR	Dor Moskovich (to Maccabi Kabilio Jaffa)

=== Hapoel Acre ===
In:

No.	Pos.	Nation	Player
—	GK	ISR	Amit Suiri (on loan from Hapoel Haifa)
—	MF	ISR	Daniel Schwrazboim (Free transfer)
—	MF	ISR	Tomer Hazan Asus (from Hapoel Tirat HaCarmel)
—	FW	ISR	Ahmed Darawshe (from Hapoel Jerusalem)

Out:

No.	Pos.	Nation	Player
—	GK	ISR	Tamir Lalou (to F.C. Tira)
—	GK	ISR	Ofek Antman (to (United States) Central Valley Fuego)
—	MF	ISR	Daniel Schwarzboim (to Hapoel Kfar Saba)
—	MF	ISR	Yam Cohen (to Hapoel Umm al-Fahm)
—	FW	ISR	Firas Ganayem (to Ironi Tiberias)
—	FW	ISR	Karem Arshid (to Maccabi Bnei Reineh)

=== Hapoel Afula ===
In:

No.	Pos.	Nation	Player
—	DF	ISR	Mor Naaman (on loan from Hapoel Tel Aviv)
—	MF	ISR	Naor Abudi (Free transfer)
—	MF	ISR	Avihay Wodaje (from F.C. Holon Yermiyahu)
—	MF	FRA	Romain Habran (from (Lithuania) FK Sūduva)
—	MF	ISR	Raz Cohen (from Hapoel Umm al-Fahm)
—	FW	ISR	Shahar Hirsh (Free transfer)

Out:

No.	Pos.	Nation	Player
—	GK	ISR	Ezra Hanna (to Bnei Eilat)
—	GK	ISR	Daniel Benesh (to Hapoel Ra'anana)
—	DF	ISR	Orel Cohen (to (Greece) Kavala)
—	DF	GAM	Kabba Sonko (Released)
—	MF	ISR	Jay Livne (on loan to Hapoel Bnei Zalafa)
—	MF	ISR	Ibrahim Jawabry (to Shimshon Tel Aviv, his player card still belongs to Maccabi Haifa)
—	MF	ISR	Itzhak Danan (to Ironi Tiberias)
—	MF	CRO	Lovre Čirjak (to (Croatia) Hrvatski Dragovoljac)
—	MF	GHA	Elvis Sakyi (Released)
—	FW	ISR	Yuval Shawat (Retired)
—	FW	ISR	Alon Buzorgi (to Hapoel Kfar Saba)

=== Hapoel Ashdod ===
In:

No.	Pos.	Nation	Player
—	DF	ISR	Shalev Avitan (on loan from Hapoel Be'er Sheva)
—	MF	ISR	Afek Sapir Navot (from Hapoel Ra'anana)

Out:

No.	Pos.	Nation	Player
—	DF	ISR	Mor Edri (to Beitar Tel Aviv Bat Yam, his player card still belongs to F.C. Ashdod)
—	MF	ISR	Mishel Ross (to Maccabi Kiryat Malakhi)
—	MF	ISR	Ben Amsalem (to Hapoel Marmorek)
—	MF	ISR	Ahmad Milad (to Hapoel Bnei Lod)
—	MF	ISR	Roy Tzairi (to Hapoel Marmorek)
—	FW	ISR	Sheliel Uzan (to Hapoel Ashkelon)
—	FW	ISR	Eli Elbaz (to Hapoel Kfar Shalem)
—	FW	ISR	Roy Tzairi (to Hapoel Bik'at HaYarden)

=== Hapoel Kfar Saba ===
In:

No.	Pos.	Nation	Player
—	GK	ISR	Roy Beigel (Free transfer)
—	DF	ISR	Shay Ben David (on loan from Maccabi Haifa)
—	MF	GHA	Cletus Nombil (on loan from Hapoel Jerusalem)
—	MF	ISR	Daniel Schwarzboim (from Hapoel Acre)

Out:

No.	Pos.	Nation	Player
—	DF	ISR	Ben Hayun (on loan to Hapoel Kfar Shalem)
—	DF	ISR	Eitan Ratzon (to Hapoel Ra'anana, his player card still belongs to Hapoel Be'er Sheva)
—	MF	ISR	Ido Davidov (to Hapoel Petah Tikva)
—	MF	ISR	Saher Taji (to Hapoel Ramat Gan)
—	MF	ISR	Dan Azaria (to Beitar Jerusalem)
—	FW	ISR	Alon Buzorgi (to Hapoel Kfar Saba)

=== Hapoel Petah Tikva ===
In:

No.	Pos.	Nation	Player
—	DF	ISR	Viki Kahlon (from Hapoel Nof HaGalil)
—	MF	ISR	Ido Davidov (from Hapoel Kfar Saba)
—	FW	ISR	Oz Peretz (from Hapoel Ramart HaSharon)
—	FW	ISR	Roei Zikri (from Hapoel Hadera)

Out:

No.	Pos.	Nation	Player
—	DF	ISR	Ron Ben Dakon (to Hapoel Ramat HaSharon)
—	MF	ISR	Daniel Twizer (to Hapoel Ra'anana)
—	MF	ISR	Ariel Lazmi (to Hapoel Rishon LeZion)

=== Hapoel Ra'anana ===
In:

No.	Pos.	Nation	Player
—	GK	ISR	Daniel Benesh (from Hapoel Afula)
—	DF	ISR	Eyal Malul (from Hapoel Ramat HaSharon)
—	DF	ISR	Eitan Ratzon (on loan from Hapoel Be'er Sheva)
—	DF	ISR	Adar Azruel (on loan from Maccabi Haifa)
—	MF	ISR	Daniel Twizer (from Hapoel Petah Tikva)
—	MF	GHA	Gershon Koffie (from (United States) Indy Eleven)
—	FW	JAM	Kevaughn Frater (from Hapoel Nof HaGalil)

Out:

No.	Pos.	Nation	Player
—	GK	ISR	Shalev Sharabi (on loan to Hapoel Kaukab)
—	DF	ISR	Liad Elmaliach (to Hapoel Karmiel)

=== Hapoel Ramat Gan ===
In:

No.	Pos.	Nation	Player
—	DF	ISR	Ofek Shimon Balas (on loan from Hapoel Kfar Shalem)
—	MF	ISR	Omer Barami (Free transfer)
—	MF	ISR	Saher Taji (from Hapoel Kfar Saba)

Out:

No.	Pos.	Nation	Player
—	MF	ISR	Roy Peretz (on loan to Shimshon Tel Aviv)
—	MF	ISR	Afek Sapir Navot (to Hapoel Ashdod)
—	MF	ISR	Ofri Hersh (on loan to Shimshon Kafr Qasim)
—	FW	ISR	Eden Hershkovitz (to Beitar Tel Aviv Bat Yam, his player card still belongs to Hapoel Tel Aviv)

=== Hapoel Ramat HaSharon ===
In:

No.	Pos.	Nation	Player
—	DF	ISR	Francisco Dutari (from (Argentina) Estudiantes (RC))
—	DF	ISR	Ohad Elbilia (from Ironi Tiberias)
—	MF	ISR	Naftali Belay (on loan from Maccabi Netanya)
—	FW	ISR	Roy Ronen (from Maccabi Petah Tikva)

Out:

No.	Pos.	Nation	Player
—	DF	ISR	Shalev Avitan (to Hapoel Marmorek, his player card still belongs to Hapoel Be'er Sheva)
—	DF	ISR	Eyal Malul (to Hapoel Ra'anana)
—	DF	ISR	Tom Ahi Mordechai (loan return to Hapoel Tel Aviv)
—	MF	ISR	Ori Zohar (to Hapoel Rishon LeZion)
—	FW	ISR	Oz Peretz (to Hapoel Petah Tikva)

=== Hapoel Rishon LeZion ===
In:

No.	Pos.	Nation	Player
—	DF	ISR	Eyas Masalha (from Maccabi Netanya)
—	MF	ISR	Ori Zohar (from Hapoel Ramat HaSharon)
—	MF	ISR	Shay Balhassen (on loan from Maccabi Tel Aviv)
—	MF	ISR	Yaniv Segev (from Hapoel Nof HaGalil)
—	MF	ISR	Ariel Lazmi (from Hapoel Petah Tikva)
—	FW	PLE	Fadi Zidan (from (Georgia (country)) Torpedo Kutaisi)

Out:

No.	Pos.	Nation	Player
—	DF	ISR	Triko Gatehun (to Maccabi Kabilio Jaffa)
—	MF	ISR	Dolev Balulu (on loan to F.C. Yermiyahu Holon)
—	MF	ISR	Shay Golan (to Beitar Tel Aviv Bat Yam)
—	MF	ISR	Yoel Abuhatzira (to Maccabi Ahi Nazareth)
—	FW	ISR	Amir Khalaila (to F.C. Dimona)
—	FW	ISR	Yahav Afriat (to F.C. Tira, his player card still belongs to Hapoel Kfar Saba)

=== Hapoel Umm al-Fahm ===
In:

No.	Pos.	Nation	Player
—	DF	ISR	Ihab Shami (from Hapoel Jerusalem)
—	MF	ISR	Raz Cohen (Free transfer)
—	MF	BRA	Pedro Sass (from Hapoel Nof HaGalil)
—	MF	ISR	Yam Cohen (from Hapoel Acre)
—	FW	ISR	Raz Buhbut (Free transfer)
—	FW	ISR	Dani Amer (from Hapoel Bu'eine)
—	FW	ISR	Idan Shemesh (from Hapoel Jerusalem)

Out:

No.	Pos.	Nation	Player
—	MF	ISR	Raz Cohen (to Hapoel Afula)
—	FW	ISR	Younes Jabarin (on loan to Shimshon Kafr Qasim)
—	FW	ISR	Timor Avitan (to Ironi Tiberias)

=== Maccabi Ahi Nazareth ===
In:

No.	Pos.	Nation	Player
—	MF	GRE	Timis Bardis (from (Greece) KF Egnatia)
—	MF	BRA	Macula (on loan from (Brazil) Estoril)
—	MF	ISR	Yoel Abuhatzira (from Hapoel Rishon LeZion)
—	FW	ISR	Mahran Lala (from F.C. Ahva Kafr Manda)

Out:

No.	Pos.	Nation	Player
—	DF	ISR	Abdi Farhat (to Ironi Tiberias, his player card still belongs to Hapoel Tel Aviv)
—	DF	ISR	Moshe Mula (to Sektzia Nes Tziona, his player card still belongs to Maccabi Netanya)
—	FW	ISR	Dovev Gabay (to Maccabi Kabilio Jaffa)

=== Maccabi Bnei Reineh ===
In:

No.	Pos.	Nation	Player
—	DF	ISR	Niv Sarel (Free transfer)
—	MF	ISR	Amir Agayev (from F.C. Ashdod)
—	MF	ISR	Atef Musa (from Hapoel Bu'eine)
—	MF	ISR	Phillip Maneh (from F.C. Kafr Qasim)
—	FW	ISR	Karem Arshid (from Hapoel Acre)
—	FW	ISR	Ali Knaana (from Hapoel Tel Aviv)

Out:

No.	Pos.	Nation	Player
—	DF	ISR	Fehmi Halabi (on loan to Hapoel Bnei Ar'ara 'Ara)
—	DF	ISR	Niv Sarel (to Hapoel Migdal HaEmek)
—	MF	ISR	Eden Dahan (to F.C. Tira)
—	MF	ISR	Samir Farhud (to F.C. Tzeirei Kafr Kanna, his player card still belongs to Hapoel Nof HaGalil)
—	MF	ISR	Fadi Sama'an (on loan to Hapoel Kaukab)

=== Sektzia Nes Tziona ===
In:

No.	Pos.	Nation	Player
—	GK	ISR	Niv Antman (Free transfer)
—	DF	ISR	Moshe Mula (on loan from Maccabi Netanya)
—	MF	ISR	Ismaeel Ryan (Free transfer)
—	MF	ISR	Shay Mazor (from Bnei Yehuda)

Out:

No.	Pos.	Nation	Player
—	DF	ISR	Mor Naaman (to Hapoel Afula, his player card still belongs to Hapoel Tel Aviv)
—	DF	ISR	Ilay Landoi (on loan to Maccabi Ironi Ashdod)
—	DF	ISR	Liran Cohen (to F.C. Dimona, his player card still belongs to Hapoel Be'er Sheva)
