= 2020–21 Israel State Cup =

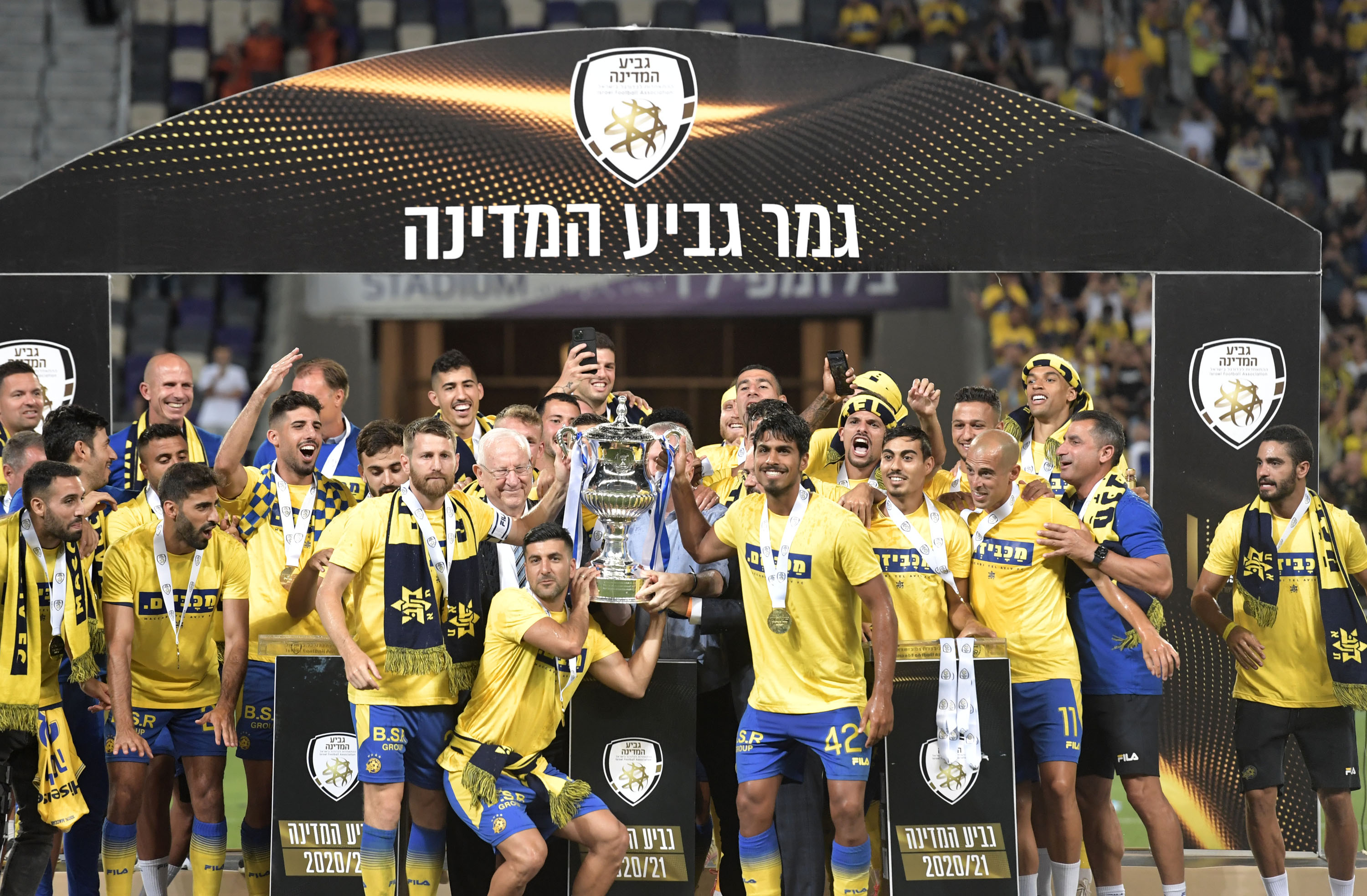
- Reuven Rivlin awards the Cup to Maccabi Tel Aviv

Tournament details
- Country: Israel
- Teams: 66

Final positions
- Champions: Maccabi Tel Aviv
- Runners-up: Hapoel Tel Aviv

Tournament statistics
- Matches played: 63
- Goals scored: 171 (2.71 per match)
- Goals scored in penalty shoot-outs not included.

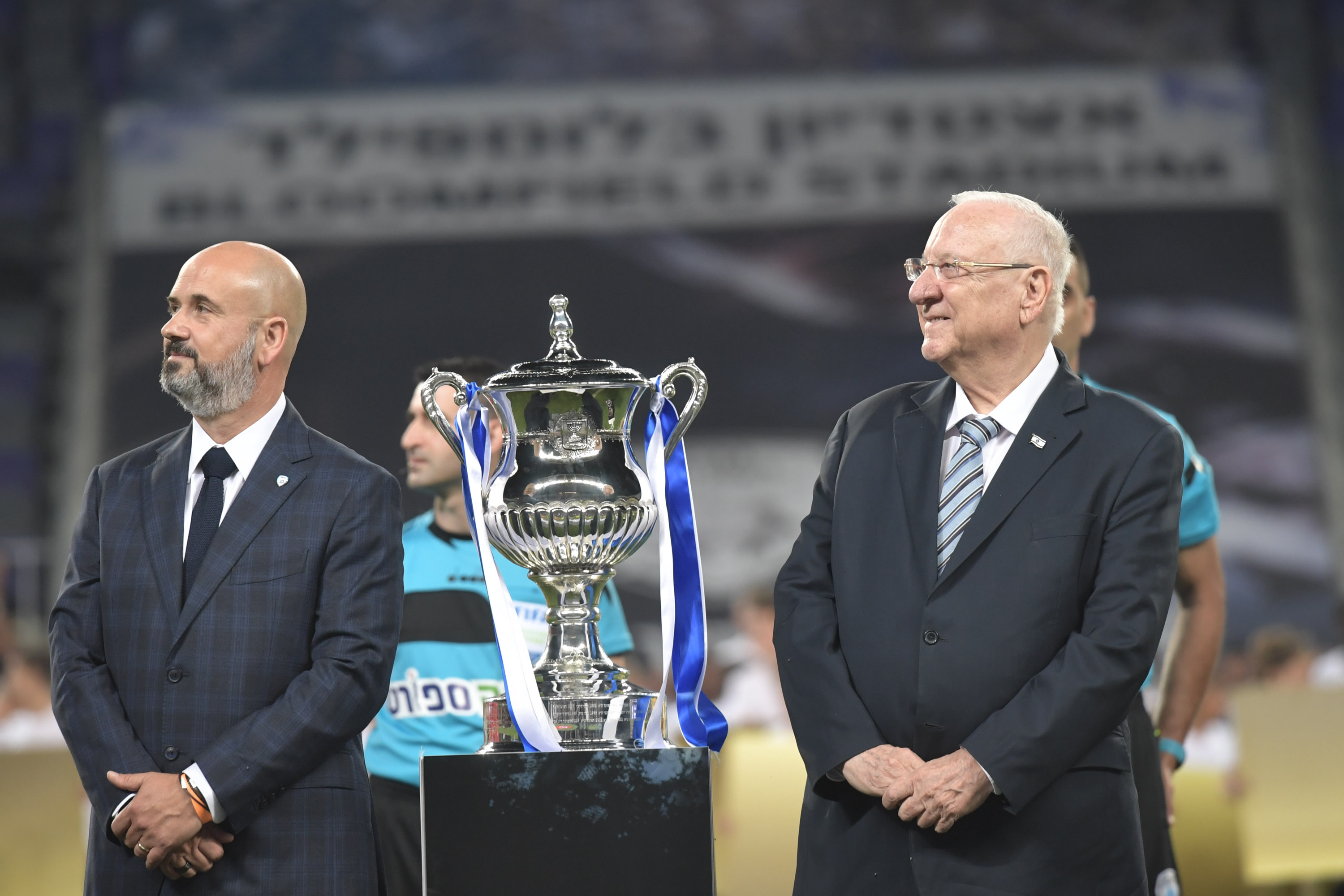
Reuven Rivlin at Bloomfield Stadium ahead of the awarding of the 2020–21 Israel State Cup, June 2021 (KBG GPO01)

The 2020–21 Israel State Cup (Hebrew: גביע המדינה, Gvia HaMedina) was the 82nd season of Israel's nationwide Association football cup competition and the 66th after the Israeli Declaration of Independence. The competition started in November 2020.

The cup winners qualified to the 2021–22 UEFA Europa Conference League second qualifying round.

Due to the second COVID-19 lockdown, the two lowest leagues in Israel were postponed. Therefore, it was decided that all teams from the fourth and fifth tiers would withdraw from the competition.

== Fourth Round ==
The 4th round matches were held on 20–21 November 2020. Eight teams from Liga Alef (Four from each regional division) will compete in this round. the winners qualify to the fifth Round.

Home team	Score	Away team
Liga Alef North
Ironi Tiberias		Hapoel Kaukab
Hapoel Bnei Fureidis	1–1 (a.e.t.) (4–3 p)	Hapoel Bnei Zalafa
Liga Alef South
Hapoel Bik'at HaYarden	0–0 (a.e.t.) (6–5 p)	F.C. Holon Yermiyahu
Shimshon Kafr Qasim	0–0 (a.e.t.) (3–5 p)	Ironi Or Yehuda

== Fifth Round ==
The 5th round matches were held on 19–24 November 2020. The four winners from the Fourth round and the remaining Liga Alef teams that received a bye in the previous round, will compete in this round. The winners qualify to the Seventh Round.

Home team	Score	Away team
Liga Alef North
Hapoel Kafr Kanna	0–2	F.C. Tira
Hapoel Bnei Ar'ara 'Ara	1–1 (a.e.t.) (1–4 p)	Ihud Bnei Majd al-Krum
Hapoel Ironi Baqa al-Gharbiyye	1–2	Maccabi Bnei Reineh
Hapoel Migdal HaEmek	2–0	Maccabi Tamra
Hapoel Bu'eine	2–1	F.C. Haifa Robi Shapira
Ironi Tiberias	0–2	Hapoel Herzliya
Tzeirey Taibe	0–2	Hapoel Bnei Fureidis
Maccabi Tzur Shalom/Kiryat Bialik	w/o	F.C. Daburiyya
Liga Alef South
Maccabi Herzliya	1–0	Ironi Ashdod
Hapoel Azor	3–0	F.C. Dimona
Maccabi Yavne	2–3	Hapoel Ashkelon
Ironi Kuseife	0–2	A.S. Nordia Jerusalem
Hakoah Amidar Ramat Gan	2–3	Hapoel Bnei Lod
Ironi Or Yehuda	1–2	Hapoel Marmorek
Maccabi Kabilio Jaffa	2–3	Hapoel Bik'at HaYarden
Maccabi Sha'arayim	w/o	A.S. Ashdod

== Seventh Round ==
The 7th round matches were held on 14–17 December 2020.
Hapoel Jerusalem, Sektzia Nes Tziona, Hapoel Afula and Hapoel Kfar Shalem received a bye to the eighth round.

14 December 2020	Hapoel Petah Tikva (2)	1–2 (a.e.t.)	Hapoel Nof HaGalil (2)	Petah Tikva
19:00	Paz Ben Ari 85' (pen.)	Report	Munir Hujierat 74'; Eli Balilty 92'	Stadium: HaMoshava Stadium; Attendance: 0 Referee: Dekel Tzino

15 December 2020	Ihud Bnei Majd al-Krum (3)	1–3	Hapoel Bik'at HaYarden (3)	Tamra
13:00		Report		Stadium: Tamra Ground

15 December 2020	Hapoel Azor (3)	2–2 (a.e.t.) (4–5 p)	Hapoel Bnei Lod (3)	Azor
13:00		Report		Stadium: Azor Stadium

15 December 2020	Hapoel Bnei Fureidis (3)	1–2	Hapoel Rishon LeZion (2)	Haifa
		Report		Stadium: Atos Haifa Fields

15 December 2020	A.S. Nordia Jerusalem (3)	2–0	Hapoel Marmorek (3)	Jerusalem
13:00	Assaf Gubeza; Asher Mashasha 90+4'	Report		Stadium: Emeq HaArazim Ground

15 December 2020	Hapoel Migdal HaEmek (3)	0–1	Hapoel Umm al-Fahm (2)	Migdal HaEmek
13:00		Report		Stadium: Municipal Stadium

15 December 2020	Hapoel Bu'eine (3)	0–2	Hapoel Acre (2)	Bu'eine Nujeidat
13:00		Report	Raz Twizer; Biton	Stadium: Bu'eine Nujeidat Ground

15 December 2020	Maccabi Bnei Reineh (3)	0–2	A.S Ashdod (3)	Kafr Kanna
13:00		Report		Stadium: Azmi Nassar Stadium

15 December 2020	Maccabi Ahi Nazareth (2)	0–1 (a.e.t.)	F.C. Kafr Qasim (2)	Nof HaGalil
19:30		Report		Stadium: Green Stadium

15 December 2020	Hapoel Nir Ramat HaSharon (2)	1–2 (a.e.t.)	F.C. Tira (3)	Lod
19:30		Report		Stadium: Lod Municipal Stadium

15 December 2020	Hapoel Herzliya (3)	0–5	Hapoel Ramat Gan Givatayim (2)	Herzliya
19:30		Report		Stadium: Herzliya Municipal Stadium

15 December 2020	Beitar Tel Aviv Bat Yam (2)	3–0	Maccabi Herzliya (3)	Ness Ziona
19:30		Report		Stadium: Ness Ziona Stadium

16 December 2020	Hapoel Ra'anana (2)	1–1 (a.e.t.) (3–1 p)	Hapoel Iksal (2)	Ramat Gan
19:00		Report		Stadium: Ramat Gan Stadium

17 December 2020	Maccabi Tzur Shalom/Kiryat Bialik (3)	2–3	Hapoel Ashkelon (3)	Kiryat Yam
13:00		Report		Stadium: Kiryat Yam Synthetic

== Eighth Round ==
Due to the third COVID-19 lockdown, this round was rescheduled. The Eighth Round matches are being held between the 19th and 22 February 2021.

19 February 2021	Maccabi Netanya (1)	2–0	Hapoel Bik'at HaYarden (3)	Netanya
13:00	Azubel 29', 74'	Report		Stadium: Netanya Stadium

19 February 2021	A.S. Nordia Jerusalem (3)	0–0 (a.e.t.) (10–9 p)	F.C. Tira (3)	Jerusalem
13:00		Report		Stadium: Emeq HaArazim; Attendance: 0

19 February 2021	Hapoel Ramat Gan Givatayim (2)	4–1 (a.e.t.)	Hapoel Bnei Lod (3)	Ramat Gan
14:00	Michael Maman 49'; Hirsh 98'; Dvir Yishay 102'; Rosh 120+1'	Report	Sun Turiel 10'	Stadium: Ramat Gan Stadium; Attendance: 0

19 February 2021	F.C. Kafr Qasim (2)	0–2	Hapoel Kfar Saba (1)	Lod
14:00		Report	Soukouna 40' (pen.); Lakau 62'	Stadium: Lod Municipal Stadium; Attendance: 0 Referee: Dror Cohen

19 February 2021	Hapoel Afula (2)	1–1 (a.e.t.) (5–3 p)	Hapoel Nof HaGalil (2)	Afula
14:00	Guy Dahan 50'	Report	Mahmmoud Jaber 14'	Stadium: Afula Illit Stadium; Attendance: 0

19 February 2021	Sektzia Nes Tziona (2)	0–1	Maccabi Petah Tikva (1)	Ness Ziona
14:00		Report	Abada 90+6'	Stadium: Ness Ziona Stadium; Attendance: 0

19 February 2021	Hapoel Jerusalem (2)	1–0 (a.e.t.)	Hapoel Rishon LeZion (2)	Jerusalem
14:00	Badash 109'	Report		Stadium: Teddy Stadium; Attendance: 0

20 February 2021	Bnei Yehuda (1)	3–3 (a.e.t.) (4–5 p)	Hapoel Haifa (1)	Tel Aviv
17:15	Dan Mori 32'; Shay Mazor 48'; Amit Zenati 104'	Report	Kayes Ganem 21'; Ido Shahar 54'; Itay Buganim 115'	Stadium: Bloomfield Stadium

20 February 2021	Maccabi Haifa (1)	2–1	Hapoel Umm al-Fahm (2)	Haifa
20:30	Lavi 11'; Donyoh 90'	Report	Levan Kutalia 45'; Joof Gaira (yellow card) 75'; Ahmed Younes (yellow card) 90+3'	Stadium: Sammy Ofer Stadium; Referee: Gal Leibovitz

21 February 2021	Beitar Tel Aviv Bat Yam (2)	2–0	Ironi Kiryat Shmona (1)	Ness Ziona
19:30	Yaniv Mizrahi 64' (pen.); Eyal Chen 90'	Report		Stadium: Ness Ziona Stadium

21 February 2021	Hapoel Kfar Shalem (2)	3–1	A.S Ashdod (3)	Ramat HaSharon
19:35	Yair Shpungin 4'; Elior Seiderre 40'; Iyad Haj 46'	Report	Oz Rali 79'	Stadium: Grundman Stadium

21 February 2021	Hapoel Acre (2)	0–2	Beitar Jerusalem (1)	Acre
20:00		Report	Yarden Shua 44' (pen.), 45+2'	Stadium: Acre Municipal Stadium

21 February 2021	Hapoel Be'er Sheva (1)	0–1	Maccabi Tel Aviv (1)	Be'er Sheva
20:45		Report	Dor Peretz 65'	Stadium: Turner Stadium

22 February 2021	Bnei Sakhnin (1)	3–0	Hapoel Hadera (1)	Sakhnin
19:45		Report		Stadium: Doha Stadium

22 February 2021	F.C. Ashdod (1)	3–1	Hapoel Ra'anana (2)	Ashdod
20:00		Report		Stadium: Yud-Alef Stadium

22 February 2021	Hapoel Tel Aviv (1)	4–0	Hapoel Ashkelon (3)	Tel Aviv
20:30		Report		Stadium: Bloomfield Stadium

== Round of 16 ==
The Round of 16 matches were played on 15–17 March 2021.

15 March 2021	Hapoel Kfar Shalem (2)	1–0 (a.e.t.)	Hapoel Jerusalem (2)	Ramat HaSharon
19:45	Ohad Hazout 91'	Report		Stadium: Grundman Stadium

15 March 2021	Beitar Tel Aviv Bat Yam (2)	3–1	Hapoel Ramat Gan (2)	Ness Ziona
20:00	Guy Mizrahi 29'; Yaniv Mizrahi 31'; Amir Berkovich 73'	Report	Michael Maman 5'	Stadium: Ness Ziona Stadium

16 March 2021	Maccabi Netanya (1)	1–3	Hapoel Tel Aviv (1)	Netanya
17:55	Fernand Gouré 75'	Report	Omri Altman 48'; Ido Vayer 82' (o.g.); Lidor Cohen 90+4'	Stadium: Netanya Stadium

16 March 2021	Bnei Sakhnin (1)	1–0	Nordia Jerusalem (3)	Sakhnin
18:00	Moti Barshazki 18'	Report		Stadium: Doha Stadium

16 March 2021	Hapoel Haifa (1)	2–3	Maccabi Tel Aviv (1)	Haifa
20:45	Hanan Maman 5'; Alon Turgeman 74'	Report	Tal Ben Haim 8' (pen.); Nisso Kapiloto 12' (o.g.); Nick Blackman 62' (pen.)	Stadium: Sammy Ofer Stadium; Referee: Shalom Ben Avraham

17 March 2021	Beitar Jerusalem (1)	1–2 (a.e.t.)	F.C. Ashdod (1)	Jerusalem
18:00	Yarden Shua 41'	Report	Roei Gordana 22' (pen.); Santiago Ocampos 93' (o.g.)	Stadium: Teddy Stadium; Attendance: 1,500; Referee: Liran Liany

17 March 2021	Hapoel Kfar Saba (1)	0–3 (a.e.t.)	Hapoel Afula (2)	Petah Tikva
18:30		Report	Guy Dahan 104'; Netanel Goldman 109'; Amit Mor 119'	Stadium: HaMoshava Stadium

17 March 2021	Maccabi Haifa (1)	2–1	Maccabi Petah Tikva (1)	Haifa
20:45	Omer Atzili 65', 83'	Report	Armando Cooper 42' (pen.)	Stadium: Sammy Ofer Stadium; Attendance: 1,500; Referee: Daniel Bar Natan

== Quarter-finals ==
The quarter-final draw took place on 18 March 2021.

20 April 2021	Hapoel Kfar Shalem (2)	0–1	Hapoel Tel Aviv (1)	Ramat HaSharon
20:30		Report	20' Siyanda Xulu	Stadium: Grundman Stadium; Referee: Aviad Shiloach

21 April 2021	Bnei Sakhnin (1)	0–4	Beitar Tel Aviv Bat Yam (2)	Sakhnin
20:00		Report	13' Yaniv Mizrahi; 23' Bar Cohen; 46', 61' Parfait Guiagon	Stadium: Doha Stadium

21 April 2021	F.C. Ashdod (1)	0–1	Maccabi Tel Aviv (1)	Ashdod
20:30		Report	54' Dor Peretz	Stadium: Yud-Alef Stadium

22 April 2021	Maccabi Haifa (1)	4–1	Hapoel Afula (2)	Haifa
20:30		Report		Stadium: Sammy Ofer Stadium

== Semi-finals ==
The semi-final draw took place on 22 April 2021.

Both games were initially postponed by a day After Hamas fired more than 150 rockets into Israel from Gaza, following the Jerusalem clashes. Later, the games were further postponed without a new scheduled date. On 17 May. the games were moved to the Sammy Ofer Stadium in Haifa.

19 May 2021	Hapoel Tel Aviv (1)	1–1 (a.e.t.) (7–6 p)	Beitar Tel Aviv Bat Yam (2)	Haifa
21:00	Omri Altman 20'; Lidor Cohen (yellow card) 55'; Adi Gotlieb (yellow card) 71'	Report	(yellow card) 44' Asaf Hershko; 57' Michael Chilaka; (yellow card) 90' Guy Mizrahi	Stadium: Sammy Ofer Stadium; Referee: Idan Layba; Assistant referees: Moshe Bohbot, Omer Barbiro; Fourth official: Aviad Shiloach
	Penalties
	Dan Einbinder (penalty scored); Gil Itzhak (penalty missed); Eyad Abu Abaid (penalty scored); Denny Gruper (penalty scored); Lidor Cohen (penalty scored); Ofek Bitton (penalty scored); Shay Ayzen (penalty scored); Raz Stain (penalty scored)		(penalty missed) Yaniv Mizrahi; (penalty scored) Ronen Hanchiz; (penalty scored) Asaf Hershko; (penalty scored) Eyal Hen; (penalty scored) Guy Mizrahi; (penalty scored) Nadav Nidam; (penalty scored) Michael Chilaka; (penalty missed) Tomer Machluf
Note: Additional source, with penalties report:

20 May 2021	Maccabi Haifa (1)	0–2	Maccabi Tel Aviv (1)	Haifa
21:00	Ofri Arad (yellow card) 22'; Mohammad Abu Fani (yellow card) 37'; Omer Atzili (yellow card) 44'; Sun Menahem (yellow card) 70'	Report	51', 60' Itay Shechter; (yellow card) 57' Eitan Tibi	Stadium: Sammy Ofer Stadium; Attendance: 0 Referee: Liran Liani; Assistant referees: Dudu Biton, Roei Hassan; Fourth official: Gal Laibuvitz
Note: due to the 2021 Israel–Palestine crisis played Behind closed doors

== Final ==
2 June 2021
20:30

Maccabi Tel Aviv	2–1 (a.e.t.)	Hapoel Tel Aviv
Cohen 73'; Hernández 96'	Report	Altman 31'

Bloomfield Stadium, Tel Aviv
Attendance: 29,000
Referee: Erez Papir
