= Livne (surname) =

Livne or Livneh is a surname, and may refer to:

- Alon Livne (born 1984/85), Israeli fashion designer
- Eliezer Livneh (1902–1975), Israeli journalist and politician
- Jey Livne (born 2001), Israeli footballer

== See also ==
- Livne
