= Nehorai Ifrach =

Israeli footballer

Personal information
- Full name: Nehorai Ifrach
- Date of birth: 7 May 2003 (age 23)
- Place of birth: Tiberias, Israel
- Height: 1.75 m (5 ft 9 in)
- Positions: Midfielder; forward

Team information
- Current team: F.C. Kiryat Yam (on loan from Maccabi Haifa)

Youth career
- 2013–2017: Ironi Tiberias
- 2017–2022: Maccabi Haifa

Senior career*
Years	Team	Apps	(Gls)
2021–	Maccabi Haifa	3	(0)
2021–2022	→ Hapoel Afula (loan)	28	(5)
2022–2023	→ Hapoel Hadera (loan)	5	(0)
2023	→ Ironi Tiberias (loan)	18	(0)
2023–2024	→ Hapoel Afula (loan)	23	(1)
2025	→ Hapoel Nof HaGalil (loan)	13	(0)
2026	→ F.C. Kiryat Yam (loan)	0	(0)

International career^{‡}
2018–2019	Israel U16	9	(4)
2019–2020	Israel U17	14	(3)
2021–2022	Israel U19	8	(1)
Medal record
Representing Israel U-19
UEFA European Under-19 Championship
Runner-up	2022 Slovakia	Team
- * Club domestic league appearances and goals as of 1 June 2026 ‡ National team caps and goals as of 4 June 2023

Nehorai Ifrach (or Nehoray Yifrah, Hebrew: נהוראי יפרח; born 7 May 2003) is an Israeli professional footballer who plays as a midfielder or as a forward for Israeli Liga Leumit club F.C. Kiryat Yam, on loan from Maccabi Haifa.

== Early life ==
Ifrach was born and raised in Tiberias, Israel, to an Israeli family of Jewish descent.

== Club career ==
Ifrach made his debut for Maccabi Haifa on 20 Feb 2021 in a game against Hapoel Umm al-Fahm F.C. in the 2020-21 Cup.

== Career statistics ==
=== Club ===
As of 04 June 2023

Appearances and goals by club, season and competition
Club	Season	Division	League		National cup		League Cup		Continental		Other		Total	
Club	Season	Division	Apps	Goals	Apps	Goals	Apps	Goals	Apps	Goals	Apps	Goals	Apps	Goals
Maccabi Haifa	2020–21	1	2	0	1	0	0	0	0	0	0	0	3	0
Hapoel Afula	2021–22	2	26	5	1	0	1	0	0	0	0	0	28	5
Hapoel Hadera	2022–23	1	5	0	0	0	0	0	0	0	0	0	5	0
Ironi Tiberias	2022–23	2	18	0	0	0	0	0	0	0	0	0	18	0
Hapoel Afula	2023–24	2	23	1	1	0	4	2	0	0	0	0	28	3
Career total			74	6	3	0	5	2	0	0	0	0	82	8

=== International ===
Appearances and goals by national team and year
National team	Year	Apps	Goals
Israel U17	2018	23	7
Israel U19	2020	8	1
Israel U21	2022	0	0
Total		31	8

== Honours ==
Maccabi Haifa

- Israeli Premier League (1): 2020–21
- Israel Super Cup (1): 2021

== See also ==
- List of Jewish footballers
- List of Jews in sports
- List of Israelis
