= Kobi Mor =

Israeli footballer

Personal information
- Full name: Yaaquv "Kobi" Mor
- Date of birth: January 7, 1993 (age 33)
- Place of birth: Or Yehuda, Israel
- Position: Left back

Team information
- Current team: Maccabi Yavne

Youth career
- 2006–2008: Hapoel Tel Aviv
- 2008–2011: Maccabi Petah Tikva
- 2011–2013: Hapoel Rishon LeZion

Senior career*
Years	Team	Apps	(Gls)
2013	Maccabi Yavne	0	(0)
2013–2014	Sektzia Ness Ziona	5	(0)
2014–2016	Hapoel Herzliya	41	(0)
2016–2018	Maccabi Netanya	46	(2)
2018–2019	Hapoel Petah Tikva	18	(0)
2019	Ironi Kiryat Shmona	13	(0)
2019–2020	Hapoel Nof HaGalil	27	(1)
2020–2021	F.C. Kafr Qasim	29	(0)
2021–2022	Sektzia Ness Ziona	35	(2)
2022–2024	Hapoel Umm al-Fahm	40	(2)
2024	Maccabi Jaffa	14	(0)
2024–2025	Hapoel Ramat HaSharon	16	(0)
2025–2026	Bnei Yehuda	14	(0)
2026–	Maccabi Yavne	16	(3)
- * Club domestic league appearances and goals as of 15 June 2026

Kobi Mor (Hebrew: קובי מור) is an Israeli footballer who plays for Maccabi Yavne.

== Honours ==
- Liga Leumit
  - Winner (1): 2016–17
