= Krešimir Kovačević =

German footballer

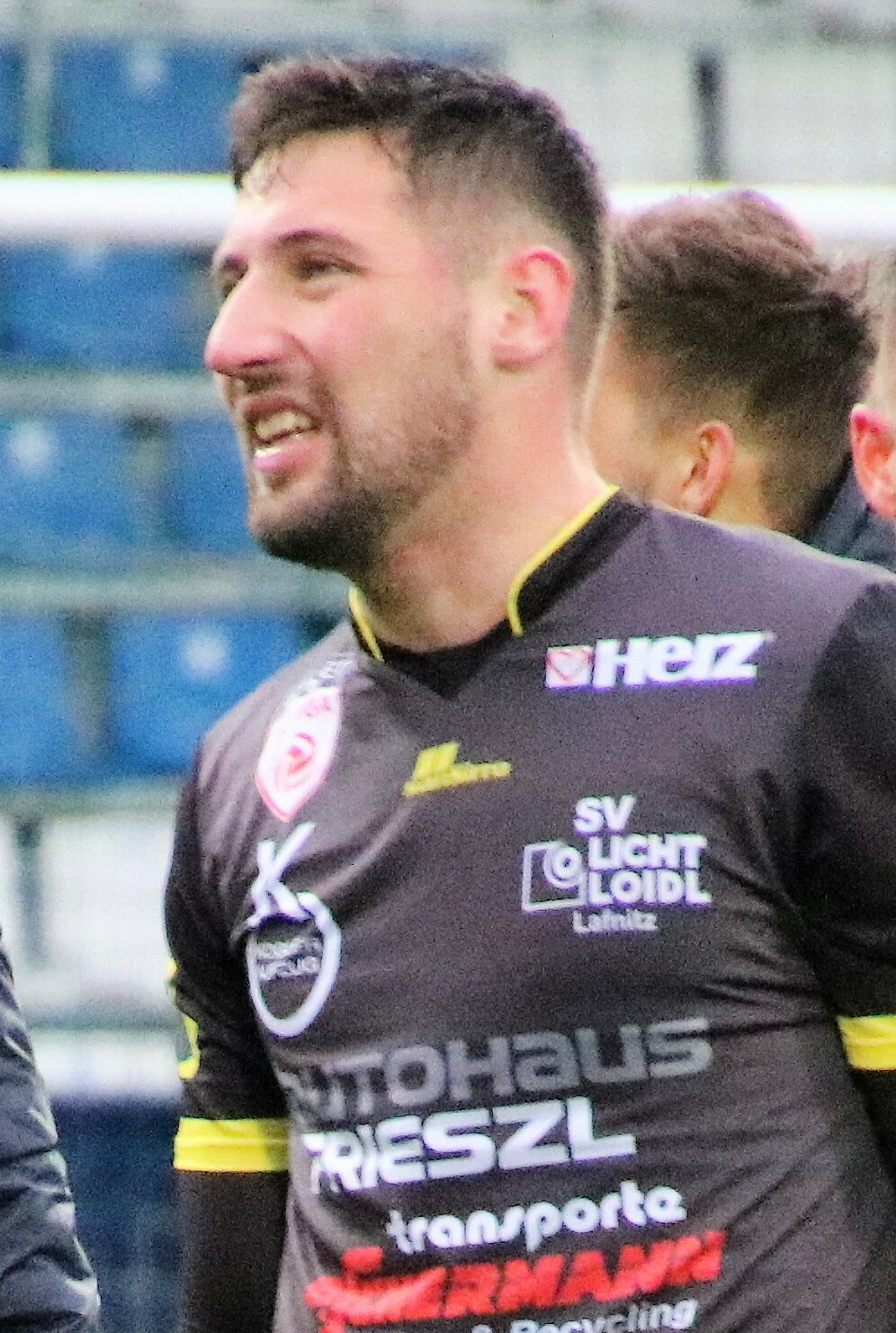
- Kovačević in 2020

Personal information
- Date of birth: 7 September 1994 (age 32)
- Place of birth: Treuchtlingen, Germany
- Height: 1.90 m (6 ft 3 in)
- Position: Forward

Team information
- Current team: Rudeš
- Number: 9

Youth career
- 2004–2007: Prigorje Žerjavinec
- 2007–2010: Sesvetski Kraljevec
- 2010–2013: Sesvete

Senior career*
Years	Team	Apps	(Gls)
2013–2015	Sesvete	13	(2)
2013	→ Dubrava (loan)	12	(1)
2015	Dugo Selo	28	(6)
2016–2018	SC Bad Tatzmannsdorf	55	(66)
2018–2019	Hartberg	12	(3)
2018–2019	Hartberg Amateure	17	(16)
2019–2020	Kustošija	4	(2)
2020	Lafnitz	14	(6)
2020	Lokomotiva	2	(0)
2021	Ermis Aradippou	16	(3)
2021–2022	SKN St. Pölten	21	(8)
2022	Hapoel Acre	1	(0)
2022–2024	Rudeš	34	(3)
2024–2025	Segesta	8	(4)
2025	Karlovac	9	(0)
2026–	Rudeš	12	(2)
- * Club domestic league appearances and goals as of 12 June 2026

Kresimir Kovacević (born 7 August 1994) is a German-born Croatian footballer who plays for Croatian side Rudeš.

== Career ==
=== SV Lafnitz ===
Born in Germany, Kovačević started his career in Croatia, playing for lower-tier clubs Prigorje Žerjavinec and NK Sesvetski Kraljevec before joining NK Sesvete at the age of 16.

On 16 January 2020 it was confirmed, Kovačević joined SV Lafnitz on a deal for the rest of the season.

=== SKN St. Pölten ===
On 9 September 2021, he returned to Austria and signed a one-year contract with SKN St. Pölten.
