= Shay Ayzen =

Israeli association footballer (born 2000)

Personal information
- Full name: Shay Lee Ayzen
- Date of birth: August 27, 2000 (age 26)
- Place of birth: Ness Ziona, Israel
- Position: Midfielder

Team information
- Current team: Maccabi Herzliya
- Number: 6

Youth career
- 2009–2010: Sektzia Ness Ziona
- 2010–2019: Hapoel Tel Aviv

Senior career*
Years	Team	Apps	(Gls)
2019–2022	Hapoel Tel Aviv	67	(0)
2023–2023	Beitar Jerusalem	3	(0)
2023–2024	Bnei Yehuda Tel Aviv	24	(1)
2024–2025	Hapoel Rishon LeZion	38	(1)
2025–	Maccabi Herzliya	35	(0)

International career
2019	Israel U-19	1	(0)
- * Club domestic league appearances and goals as of 24 June 2026

Shay Ayzen (Hebrew: שי אייזן; born August 27, 2000) is an Israeli professional footballer who plays for Maccabi Herzliya.

== Career ==
Ayzen started playing football in Hapoel Tel Aviv's youth team. On November 4, 2019, he made his senior debut in the 1–2 loss against Maccabi Haifa. On February 24, 2020, Ayzen was sent off (given a red card) in the Derby Tel Aviv, with their team losing 0–3. On June 2, 2021, he scored an equalizer goal against Maccabi Tel Aviv in the 116th minute in the Israel State Cup final but a VAR review disallowed the goal after it was determined Ayzen had committed a foul and Ayzen was subsequently sent off.

On June 30, 2022, Ayzen signed a four-year contract worth $220,000 with F.C. Ashdod, but the transfer ultimately did not happen. After 3 months, he signed for Beitar Jerusalem.

On 8 January 2023, Ayzen signed for Bnei Yehuda.

On 5 February 2024, signed for Hapoel Rishon LeZion.
