= Samah Mar'ab =

Israeli footballer

Personal information
- Full name: Samah Mar'ab
- Date of birth: January 8, 1991 (age 35)
- Place of birth: Kafr Qasim, Israel
- Position: Attacking midfielder

Team information
- Current team: Kafr Qasim
- Number: 10

Youth career
- Maccabi Petah Tikva

Senior career*
Years	Team	Apps	(Gls)
2009–2011	Maccabi Petah Tikva	1	(0)
2012–2016	Kafr Qasim	87	(46)
2015	→ Hapoel Kafr Qasim	5	(2)
2016	Maccabi Netanya	8	(1)
2017–2022	Kafr Qasim	156	(30)
2022–2024	Hapoel Umm al-Fahm	28	(4)
2024	Hapoel Kafr Qasim	16	(3)
2024–	Kafr Qasim	62	(5)
- * Club domestic league appearances and goals as of 24 June 2026

Samah Mar'ab or Sameh Mareev (Arabic: سماح مأرب, Hebrew: סאמח מרעב; born January 8, 1991) is an Israeli footballer who plays for Kafr Qasim.
