= Aliyu Yau Adam =

Nigerian footballer (born 2000)

Personal information
- Date of birth: 7 May 2000 (age 26)
- Place of birth: Jos, Nigeria
- Height: 1.75 m (5 ft 9 in)
- Position: Midfielder

Team information
- Current team: Zakho SC
- Number: 26

Youth career
- Gee-Lec

Senior career*
Years	Team	Apps	(Gls)
2019–2023	Spartaks Jūrmala	25	(4)
2020–2021	→ Sfântul Gheorghe (loan)	22	(2)
2021–2022	→ Hapoel Acre (loan)	36	(1)
2022–2023	→ Bnei Yehuda (loan)	28	(0)
2024–2025	Al-Ittihad Tripoli	0	(0)
2025–	Zakho SC	38	(1)

International career
2019	Nigeria U23	2	(0)
- * Club domestic league appearances and goals as of 09 March 2026

Aliyu Yau Adam (born 7 May 2000) is a Nigerian football midfielder who plays for Zakho SC. He was a squad member for the 2019 Africa U-23 Cup of Nations.
