= Jey Livne =

Israeli footballer (born 2001)

Jey Livne ג'יי לבנה
Personal information
- Date of birth: 22 January 2001 (age 25)
- Place of birth: Israel
- Height: 1.87 m (6 ft 1 1/2 in)
- Position: Defensive midfielder

Team information
- Current team: Hapoel Ramat Gan Givatayim
- Number: 12

Youth career
- 2011–2015: Hapoel Asi Gilboa
- 2015–2018: Maccabi Haifa
- 2018–2019: Ironi Nesher
- 2019–2020: Ironi Kiryat Shmona

Senior career*
Years	Team	Apps	(Gls)
2020–2023	Hapoel Bnei Zalafa	64	(6)
2021	→ Hapoel Afula	4	(0)
2022	→ Maccabi Akhi Nazareth	1	(0)
2023–2024	Hapoel Herzliya	26	(4)
2024–2025	Hapoel Ramat HaSharon	17	(4)
2025–2026	Hapoel Acre	36	(2)
2026–	Hapoel Ramat Gan Givatayim	3	(0)
- * Club domestic league appearances and goals as of 20 March 2026

Jey Livne (Hebrew: ג'יי לבנה; born 22 January 2001) is an Israeli footballer who plays as a defensive midfielder for Liga Leumit club Hapoel Ramat Gan Givatayim.

== Club career ==
On July 21, 2021, Livne signed on Hapoel Afula from the Liga Leumit.

On July 20, 2022, Livne signed on Maccabi Akhi Nazareth from the Liga Leumit.

On July 23, 2023, Livne signed on Hapoel Herzliya from the Liga Alef.

== See also ==
- List of Jewish footballers
- List of Jews in sports
- List of Israelis
- List of Israel international footballers
