= Yaniv Mizrahi =

Israeli footballer

Personal information
- Date of birth: August 30, 1995 (age 31)
- Place of birth: Ramat Gan, Israel
- Height: 1.85 m (6 ft 1 in)
- Position: Centre forward

Team information
- Current team: Hapoel Ramat Gan

Youth career
- 2004–2005: Maccabi Ramat Amidar
- 2005–2009: Maccabi Tel Aviv
- 2009–2015: Hapoel Ramat Gan

Senior career*
Years	Team	Apps	(Gls)
2014–2016	Hapoel Ramat Gan	31	(0)
2016	Dila Gori	3	(0)
2016–2017	Hapoel Kfar Shalem	18	(6)
2017	Sektzia Ness Ziona	5	(1)
2017–2018	Maccabi Kiryat Gat	17	(9)
2018–2019	Hapoel Ramat HaSharon	28	(4)
2019	Hapoel Hadera	0	(0)
2019–2020	Hapoel Acre	16	(4)
2020–2021	Beitar Tel Aviv Bat Yam	37	(21)
2021–2024	Maccabi Netanya	28	(3)
2022	→ F.C. Ashdod	7	(0)
2022–2023	→ Bnei Yehuda	33	(12)
2023–2024	→ Hapoel Ramat Gan	19	(6)
2024–	Hapoel Ramat Gan	35	(11)
2025–	Hapoel Afula F.C. (Loan)	30	(10)
- * Club domestic league appearances and goals as of 24 June 2026

Yaniv Mizrahi (Hebrew: יניב מזרחי; born 30 August 1995) is an Israeli professional footballer who plays as a forward for Hapoel Afula F.C., on loan from Liga Leumit club Hapoel Ramat Gan.

Mizrahi started his career with Hapoel Ramat Gan. On 22 November 2013, he made his senior debut in the 0–0 draw against Hapoel Jerusalem. On 22 August 2016 he signed for Erovnuli Liga club Dila Gori. In the 2020–21 season, he scored 21 goals for Beitar Tel Aviv Bat Yam and was the top goalscorer with Idan Shemesh.
