= Manamto Asefa =

Israeli footballer

Itzhak Asefa יצחק אספה
Personal information
- Full name: Itzhak Manamto Asefa
- Date of birth: 19 November 1998 (age 27)
- Place of birth: Ethiopia
- Positions: Right back; midfielder

Team information
- Current team: Ironi Rishon LeZion

Youth career
- 2010–2016: F.C. Ashdod

Senior career*
Years	Team	Apps	(Gls)
2015–2023	F.C. Ashdod	44	(1)
2022	→ Bnei Yehuda	2	(0)
2023–2024	Hapoel Ashdod	17	(1)
2024	Hapoel Kfar Shalem	4	(0)
2024–2025	Hapoel Ashdod	20	(8)
2025–	Ironi Rishon LeZion	27	(0)

International career
2014–2015	Israel U17	6	(0)
2016–2017	Israel U19	6	(1)
2017–2020	Israel U21	2	(0)
- * Club domestic league appearances and goals as of 24 June 2026

Itzhak Manamto Asefa (Hebrew: יצחק מאנאמטו אספה; born 19 November 1998) is an Israeli footballer who plays as midfielder for Ironi Rishon LeZion in Liga Leumit.

Asefa was born in Ethiopia to a Jewish family. At the age of 8, his family immigrated to Israel.

On 30 January 2020, the District court sentenced Asefa to 4.5 years in prison, after finding him guilty of leaving the scene of an accident without stopping to assist the injured victim. He was never convicted of vehicular homicide, as the police concluded that the victim, Ari Nesher, son of well known Israeli film director and producer Avi Nesher, was to blame for the accident. Ari was sitting illegally on the electric bike of his friend, in violation of the law that prohibits more than one person on a bike. In addition, neither lad was wearing a helmet, also required by law. Initially it was suspected he had been drunk, but this was never proven. The Supreme Court reduced his sentence to 3 years. On the 16th of January 2022 he was released, after getting reduced time for good behavior.
