= Yaniv Segev =

Israeli footballer

Personal information
- Date of birth: 20 June 1996 (age 30)
- Place of birth: Israel
- Position: Midfielder

Team information
- Current team: Hapoel Marmorek

Youth career
- Bidvest Wits

Senior career*
Years	Team	Apps	(Gls)
2015	Maccabi Petah Tikva	0	(0)
2015	Hapoel Nir Ramat HaSharon	2	(0)
2016	Maccabi Yavne	1	(0)
2017	Hapoel Jerusalem	0	(0)
2017	Hapoel Kfar Shalem		
2018	Ironi Nesher	8	(0)
2019	IFK Lidingö	24	(5)
2020	Karlbergs BK	2	(1)
2020	U Cluj	1	(0)
2021	Aerostar Bacău	3	(0)
2021–2022	Hapoel Nof HaGalil	0	(0)
2022	Hapoel Rishon LeZion	9	(0)
2022–2023	Ironi Modi'in	13	(0)
2023–2025	Hapoel Herzliya	32	(0)
2025	Maccabi Yavne	12	(0)
2025–	Hapoel Marmorek	5	(0)
- * Club domestic league appearances and goals as of 1 October 2025

Yaniv Segev (Hebrew: יניב שגב; born 20 June 1996) is an Israeli footballer who plays as a midfielder for Hapoel Marmorek. He was born in Israel to a Portuguese-Jewish dad and South African-Jewish mom.

== Career ==
=== Club career ===
As a youth player, Segev joined the youth academy of South African side Bidvest Wits. Before the second half of 2014–15, he signed for Maccabi Petah Tikva in the Israeli top flight. In 2015, he signed for Israeli second division club Hapoel Nir Ramat HaSharon. In 2017, Segev signed for Hapoel Kfar Shalem in the Israeli third division. Before the second half of 2017–18, he signed for Israeli second division team Ironi Nesher.

Before the 2019 season, he signed for IFK Lidingö in the Swedish fourth division. In 2020, Segev signed for Romanian second division outfit U Cluj. In 2021, he signed for Hapoel Nof HaGalil in the Israeli top flight. On 18 December 2021, he debuted for Hapoel Nof HaGalil during a 0–2 loss to Maccabi Petah Tikva.

=== International career ===
Segev is eligible to represent South Africa and Portugal internationally.
