= Raz Cohen =

Israeli footballer

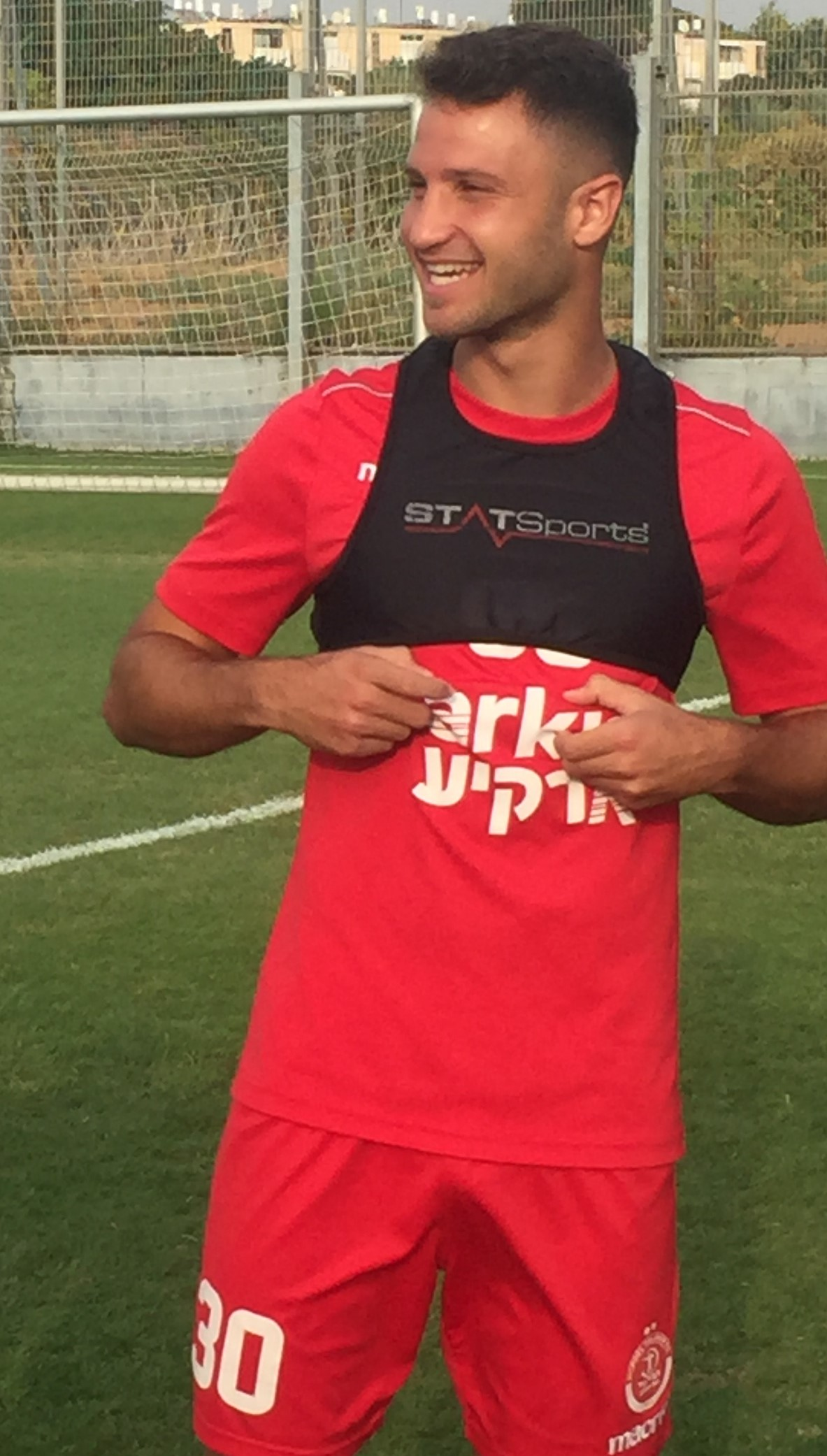

Personal information
- Full name: Raz Cohen
- Date of birth: November 11, 1994 (age 31)
- Place of birth: Kfar Saba, Israel
- Height: 1.65 m (5 ft 5 in)
- Position: Defensive midfielder

Youth career
- 2002–2014: Hapoel Kfar Saba

Senior career*
Years	Team	Apps	(Gls)
2011–2018	Hapoel Kfar Saba	107	(6)
2018–2020	Hapoel Tel Aviv	24	(0)
2020–2021	Hapoel Kfar Saba	28	(0)
2021–2022	Hapoel Umm al-Fahm	7	(0)
2022	Hapoel Afula	13	(0)
2022–2023	Hapoel Ramat Gan	8	(0)
2023–2025	Hapoel Afula	42	(3)
- * Club domestic league appearances and goals

Raz Cohen (Hebrew: רז כהן) is an Israeli former footballer.
