= Guy Mizrahi =

Israeli association footballer

Personal information
- Date of birth: 30 March 2001 (age 25)
- Place of birth: Petah Tikva, Israel
- Height: 1.77 m (5 ft 9 1/2 in)
- Position: Right back

Team information
- Current team: Hapoel Be'er Sheva
- Number: 2

Youth career
- 2010–2013: Hapoel Petah Tikva
- 2013–2020: Maccabi Tel Aviv
- 2018–2019: → Hapoel Ramat HaSharon

Senior career*
| Years | Team | Apps | (Gls) |
| 2020–2023 | Maccabi Tel Aviv | 0 | (0) |
| 2020–2021 | → Beitar Tel Aviv Bat Yam | 34 | (0) |
| 2021–2022 | → Ironi Kiryat Shmona | 27 | (0) |
| 2022–2023 | → Hapoel Haifa | 23 | (1) |
| 2023–2024 | Maccabi Netanya | 23 | (0) |
| 2024– | Hapoel Be'er Sheva | 73 | (2) |

International career^{‡}
| 2019 | Israel U18 | 2 | (0) |
| 2019 | Israel U19 | 5 | (0) |
| 2022 | Israel U21 | 1 | (0) |
| 2025– | Israel | 11 | (1) |
- * Club domestic league appearances and goals as of 23:35, 26 October 2026 (UTC) ‡ National team caps and goals as of 02:50, 18 November 2026 (UTC)

Guy Mizrahi (Hebrew: גיא מזרחי; born 30 March 2001) is an Israeli professional footballer who plays as an right back for Israeli Premier League club Hapoel Be'er Sheva and the Israel national team.

== Club career ==
=== Hapoel Be'er Sheva ===
On June 30, 2024, Mizrahi signed a four-year contract with Hapoel Be'er Sheva from the Israeli Premier League.

== International career ==
On 16 March 2025 he was called-up to the Senior team's squad.

== Honours ==
Hapoel Beer Sheva

- Israeli Premier League: 2025–26
- Israel State Cup: 2024–25
- Israel Super Cup: 2025

== See also ==
- List of Jewish footballers
- List of Jews in sports
- List of Israelis
- List of Israel international footballers
