= Israel Rosh =

Israeli footballer

Personal information
- Date of birth: March 5, 1988 (age 38)
- Place of birth: Ashdod, Israel
- Height: 1.83 m (6 ft 0 in)
- Position: Center back

Team information
- Current team: Ironi Ashkelon

Youth career
- F.C. Ashdod
- Hakoah Amidar Ramat Gan

Senior career*
Years	Team	Apps	(Gls)
2007–2009	Hakoah Amidar Ramat Gan	58	(0)
2009–2015	F.C. Ashdod	138	(6)
2015–2017	Hapoel Ramat Gan	63	(10)
2017–2018	Hapoel Tel Aviv	17	(0)
2018–2021	Hapoel Ramat Gan	102	(7)
2021–2022	Ironi Tiberias	30	(1)
2022–2023	Hapoel Ra'anana	31	(2)
2023–2024	Hapoel Ashdod	27	(0)
2024–	Ironi Ashkelon	0	(0)
- * Club domestic league appearances and goals as of 1 June 2024

Israel Rosh (Hebrew: ישראל ראש; born March 3, 1988) is an Israeli footballer playing for Ironi Ashkelon.

He is of a Tunisian-Jewish descent.
