= Moti Barshazki =

Israeli footballer

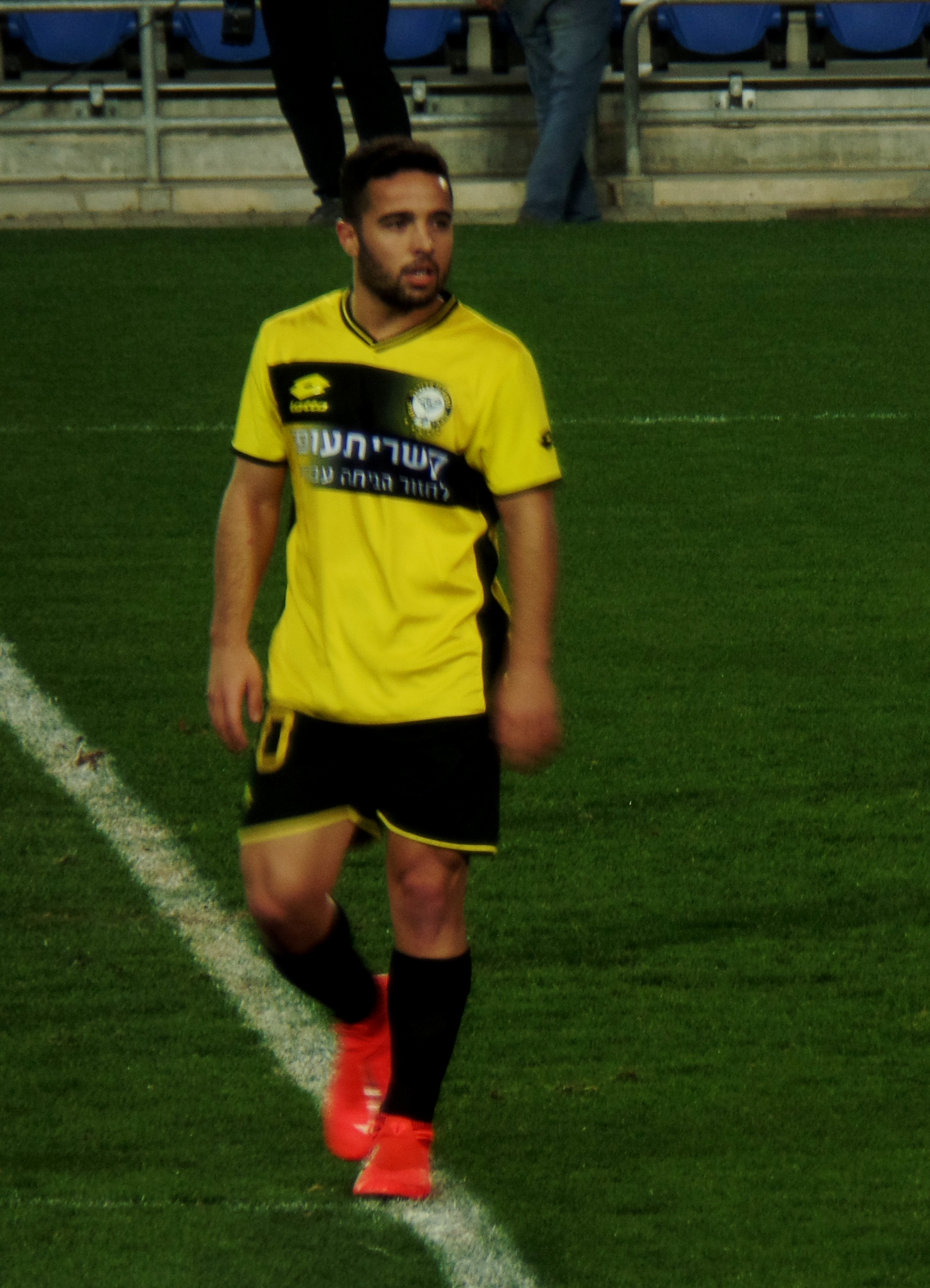
- Moti Barshazki in 2019.

Personal information
- Full name: Moti Barshazki
- Date of birth: 6 September 1996 (age 30)
- Place of birth: Givatayim, Israel
- Height: 1.62 m (5 ft 4 in)
- Positions: Attacking midfielder; winger

Team information
- Current team: Hapoel Ramat Gan
- Number: 77

Youth career
- 2004–2016: Hapoel Ramat Gan

Senior career*
Years	Team	Apps	(Gls)
2013–2017	Hapoel Ramat Gan	65	(10)
2017–2020	Hapoel Tel Aviv	69	(10)
2018–2019	→ Maccabi Netanya	29	(4)
2020–2022	Bnei Sakhnin	50	(4)
2022	F.C. Ashdod	7	(2)
2022–2024	Maccabi Petah Tikva	37	(5)
2024–2025	Bnei Yehuda	25	(2)
2025–	Hapoel Ramat Gan	47	(5)

International career
2013	Israel U18	2	(0)
2016–2019	Israel U21	14	(4)
- * Club domestic league appearances and goals as of 24 June 2026

Moti Barshazki (Hebrew: מוטי ברשצקי; born 6 September 1996) is an Israeli professional footballer who plays as an attacking midfielder and a winger for Israeli club Hapoel Ramat Gan and the Israel national under-21 football team.

== Career statistics ==
=== Club ===
As to 15 January 2024

Club	Season	League		Cup		League Cup		Total	
Club	Season	Apps	Goals	Apps	Goals	Apps	Goals	Apps	Goals
Hapoel Ramat Gan
Hapoel Ramat Gan	2013–14	5	0	0	0	0	0	5	0
Hapoel Ramat Gan	2014–15	7	0	0	0	3	0	10	0
Hapoel Ramat Gan	2015–16	33	4	2	0	2	0	37	4
Hapoel Ramat Gan	2016–17	20	6	1	0	4	0	25	6
Hapoel Tel Aviv	2016–17	11	2	1	0	0	0	12	2
Hapoel Tel Aviv	2017–18	32	6	2	0	3	2	37	8
Hapoel Tel Aviv	2018–19	0	0	0	0	4	0	4	0
Maccabi Netanya	2018–19	29	4	4	0	0	0	33	4
Hapoel Tel Aviv	2019–20	26	2	4	1	4	1	34	4
Bnei Sakhnin	2020–21	31	3	3	1	0	0	34	4
Bnei Sakhnin	2021–22	19	1	2	0	5	1	26	2
F.C. Ashdod	2021–22	7	2	0	0	0	0	7	2
Maccabi Petah Tikva	2022–23	26	5	4	1	0	0	30	6
Maccabi Petah Tikva	2023–24	11	0	0	0	1	0	12	0
Bnei Yehuda	2023–24	0	0	0	0	0	0	0	0
Career total		257	35	23	3	26	4	306	42

=== International ===
National team	Year	Apps	Goals
Israel U18	2013	2	0
Israel U21	2016	2	1
Israel U21	2017	4	1
Total		8	2
