= 2017–18 Maccabi Haifa F.C. season =

Maccabi Haifa
2017–18 season
- Chairman: Ya'akov Shahar
- Manager: Guy Luzon (until 9 December 2017); Rob Maas (interim); Fred Rutten (from 24 January 2018)
- Stadium: Sammy Ofer
- Ligat Ha'Al: 10th
- State Cup: Quarter-final
- Toto Cup: Semi-final
- Top goalscorer: League: Nikita Rukavytsya (9); All: Nikita Rukavytsya (14)
- Highest home attendance: 28,114 (vs Beitar Jerusalem, 21 October 2017)
- Lowest home attendance: 1,500 (vs Hapoel Acre, 24 October 2017)
- Average home league attendance: 13,682

The 2017–18 season was Maccabi Haifa's 60th season in Israeli Premier League, and their 36th consecutive season in the top division of Israeli football.

== Club ==
=== Kits ===
- Provider: Nike, Inc.
- Main Sponsor: Honda
- Secondary Sponsor: Pointer and Variety Israel

Home	Away	3rd	4th	GK	GK 2

=== Squad information ===
N	Pos.	Nat.	Name	Age	EU	Since	App	Goals	Ends	Transfer fee	Notes
1	GK	(Israel)	Ohad Levita	31	EU	2014/15	42	0	2019	Free	
2	CB	(Brazil)	Allyson	26	Non-EU	2017/18	38	0	2020	Free	
4	CB	(Netherlands)	Etiënne Reijnen	30	Non-EU	2017/18	8	0	2019	Free	
5	CB	(Israel)	Rami Gershon (captain)	29	Non-EU	2017/18	32	0	2022	750,000€	
6	DM	(Israel)	Gal Alberman	34	EU	2017/18	36	0	2019	Free	
7	RW	(Israel)	Sintayehu Sallalich	26	Non-EU	2017/18	60	8	2019	Free	
8	FW	(Israel)	Ofir Mizrahi	23	Non-EU	2017/18	30	6	2019	€170,000	
9	FW	(Israel)	Mohammed Awaed	20	Non-EU	2014/15	37	2	2019	Youth system	
10	CM	(Israel)	Shlomi Azulay	27	Non-EU	2017/18	24	2	2020	Free	Originally from youth system
11	AM	(Israel)	Maor Buzaglo	29	Non-EU	2017/18	15	0	2020	Free	Originally from youth system
13	FW	(Australia)	Nikita Rukavytsya	30	EU	2016/17	65	27	2019	400,000€	Israel Resident
16	FW	(Israel)	Omer Damari	27	Non-EU	2016/17	31	4	2018	Free	
18	AM	(Brazil)	Caio	31	Non-EU	2017/18	27	3	2019	Free	
19	AM	(Israel)	Roi Kahat	25	Non-EU	2016/17	73	10	2020	1,000,000€	
22	GK	(Israel)	Gil Ofek	31	Non-EU	2015/16	1	0	2017	Free	Originally from youth system
23	LB	(Israel)	Omri Ben Harush	26	Non-EU	2017/18	25	3	2019	Free	
25	CM	(Israel)	Raz Meir	21	Non-EU	2014/15	25	0	2019	Free	
26	RB	(Cameroon)	Ernest Mabouka	29	Non-EU	2017/18	33	0	2019	€400,000	
31	DM	(Israel)	Neta Lavi	20	Non-EU	2015/16	83	1	2021	Youth system	
32	FW	(Israel)	Amit Zenati	20	Non-EU	2016/17	23	1	2018	Youth system	
33	FW	(Greece)	Stefanos Athanasiadis	28	EU	2017/18	20	1	2020	Free	
40	CB	(Israel)	Yonatan Levi	18	Non-EU	2016/17	18	0	N/A	Youth system	
55	GK	(Israel)	Omri Glazer	21	Non-EU	2016/17	62	0	2020	250,000€	
70	CM	(Bulgaria)	Georgi Kostadinov	26	EU	2017/18	32	2	2020	Free	

- Last updated: 14 May 2018
- Source: mhaifafc.com, Israel Football Association, UEFA Players transfer,
- Ordered by squad number.

=== Current coaching staff ===
Position	Staff
Sporting Director	(Netherlands) Mohammed Allach
Manager	(Netherlands) Fred Rutten
Assistant Manager	(Netherlands) Rob Maas
Assistant Manager	(Israel) Itay Mordechai
Goalkeeping Coach	(Netherlands) Arno van Zwam
Fitness Coach	(Israel) Eran Shado
Fitness Coach	(Israel) Uri Harel
Club Administrator	(Israel) Rafi Osmo
Club doctor	(Israel) Dr. Ami Berber
Masseur	(Israel) Alexander Rubenchik
Physiotherapist	(Israel) Tomer Bassan
Physiotherapist	(Israel) Sergei Kotov
Logistic	(Israel) Shay Bar
Logistic	(Israel) Shlomi Elimelech
analyst	(Israel) Idan Yona

Last updated: 4 February 2018
Source: F.C. Maccabi Haifa Official Website

== Transfers ==
=== In ===
Date	Pos.	Player	Age	Moving from	Type	Fee	Notes	Source
28 May 2017	DF	(Brazil) Allyson	26	(Israel) Maccabi Petah Tikva	Free agent	Free		
1 June 2017	MF	(Israel) Gal Alberman	34	(Israel) Maccabi Tel Aviv	Free agent	Free		
23 June 2017	MF	(Bulgaria) Georgi Kostadinov	22	(Bulgaria) Levski Sofia	Free agent	Free		
26 June 2017	FW	(Israel) Ofir Mizrahi	23	(Israel) Ironi Kiryat Shmona	Transfer	€170,000		
27 June 2017	DF	(Israel) Omri Ben Harush	26	(Israel) Maccabi Tel Aviv	Free agent	Free		
1 July 2017	FW	(Israel) Shon Weissman	22	(Israel) Maccabi Netanya	Loan returns	Free		
9 July 2017	DF	(Israel) Raz Meir	21	(Israel) Hapoel Ashkelon	Loan returns	Free		
9 July 2017	DF	(Cameroon) Ernest Mabouka	29	(Slovakia) Žilina	Transfer	€400,000		
13 July 2017	MF	(Brazil) Caio	31	(Switzerland) Grasshopper	Transfer	€500,000		
13 August 2017	DF	(Israel) Rami Gershon	29	(Belgium) Gent	Transfer	€750,000		
22 August 2017	FW	(Greece) Stefanos Athanasiadis	28	(Greece) PAOK	Transfer	Future Transfer		
27 August 2017	MF	(Israel) Sintayehu Sallalich	26	(Slovenia) Maribor	Free agent	Free		
29 August 2017	MF	(Israel) Shlomi Azulay	27	(Israel) Maccabi Tel Aviv	Transfer	Free		
27 September 2017	MF	(Israel) Maor Buzaglo	29	(Israel) Hapoel Be'er Sheva	Free agent	Free		
31 January 2018	DF	(Netherlands) Etiënne Reijnen	30	(Netherlands) FC Groningen	Free agent	Free		

=== Out ===
Date	Pos.	Player	Age	Moving to	Type	Fee	Notes	Source
8 June 2017	DF	(Israel) Eyad Abu Abaid	22	(Israel) Ironi Kiryat Shmona	Release	Free		
27 June 2017	DF	(Israel) Ayid Habshi	22	(Israel) Bnei Yehuda	Loan out	Free		
29 June 2017	DF	(Israel) Ofri Arad	18	(Israel) Hapoel Ramat Gan	Loan out	Free		
30 June 2017	MF	(Israel) Liad Mordachi	19	(Israel) Ironi Nesher	Loan out	Free		
1 July 2017	MF	(Israel) Ismaeel Ryan	23	(Israel) Ironi Kiryat Shmona	Release	Future Transfer		
1 July 2017	MF	(Kosovo) Enis Alushi	31	(Germany) Nürnberg	End of Loan	Free		
1 July 2017	DF	(Iceland) Hólmar Örn Eyjólfsson	26	(Bulgaria) Levski Sofia	Loan out	Free		
4 July 2017	FW	(Israel) Yahav Gurfinkel	19	(Israel) Hapoel Nazareth Illit	Loan out	Free		
7 July 2017	DF	(Israel) Peter Elias	19	(Israel) Hapoel Nazareth Illit	Loan out	Free		
7 July 2017	FW	(Israel) Eias Arraf	19	(Israel) Hapoel Nazareth Illit	Loan out	Free		
29 July 2017	DF	(Spain) Marc Valiente	30	(Belgium) Eupen	End of contract	Free		
5 August 2017	DF	(Uruguay) Gary Kagelmacher	29	(Belgium) Kortrijk	Release	€250,000		
11 August 2017	MF	(Norway) Fitim Azemi	25	(Norway) Vålerenga	Release	€250,000		
14 August 2017	MF	(Israel) Yaniv Brik	22	(Israel) Maccabi Petah Tikva	Loan out	Free		
22 August 2017	DF	(Israel) Sun Menahem	23	(Israel) Ironi Kiryat Shmona	Loan out	Free		
1 July 2017	MF	(Czech Republic) Kamil Vacek	30	(Poland) Śląsk Wrocław	Release	Free		
29 August 2017	FW	(Israel) Eliran Atar	38	(Israel) Maccabi Tel Aviv	Transfer	€650,000		
3 September 2017	MF	(Israel) Mohammad Abu Fani	19	(Israel) Hapoel Ramat Gan	Loan out	Free		
4 September 2017	MF	(Israel) Eitan Velblum	19	(Israel) Hapoel Ramat Gan	Loan out	Free		
5 September 2017	FW	(Israel) Shon Weissman	21	(Israel) Ironi Kiryat Shmona	Loan out	Free		
1 January 2018	DF	(Israel) Dekel Keinan	33	(United States) FC Cincinnati	Release	Free		
22 January 2018	DF	(Israel) Shay Ben David	20	(Israel) Hapoel Ashkelon	Loan out	Free		
18 January 2018	MF	(Israel) Gili Vermouth	32	(Israel) Hapoel Haifa	Release	Free		

== Pre-season and friendlies ==
Win Draw Loss Postponed

4 Jule 2017	Maccabi Haifa	1 – 1	Hapoel Ashkelon	Haifa
19:00	Weissman 82' (pen.)		Sharon Gormzano 71'	Stadium: Kfar Galim Training Ground

13 Jule 2017 Training Camp	Maccabi Haifa (Israel)	4 – 0	(Germany) Wolfsburg II	Opalenica, Poland
19:00	Ben Harush 14'; Weissman 48'; Atar 61'; Zenati 79'	Report

16 Jule 2017 Training Camp	Maccabi Haifa (Israel)	1 – 0	(Poland) Miedź Legnica	Opalenica, Poland
	Atar 21'	Report

19 July 2017 Training Camp	Maccabi Haifa (Israel)	0 – 5	(Czech Republic) Sigma Olomouc	Opalenica, Poland

25 Jule 2017	Maccabi Haifa	3 – 0	Hapoel Rishon LeZion	Haifa
18:45	Vermouth 36' (pen.); Awaed 45'; Mizrahi 64'	Report		Stadium: Kfar Galim Training Ground

31 August 2017	Maccabi Haifa	4 – 3	Maccabi Netanya	Haifa
	Caio 25'; Athanasiadis 45', 55'; Kahat 60'	Report	Saba 30'; Ribeiro,	Stadium: Kfar Galim Training Ground

31 August 2017	Maccabi Haifa	5 – 0	Ironi Tiberias	Haifa
	Athanasiadis 7', 31'; Damari 42'; Rukavytsya 60', 79'	Report		Stadium: Kfar Galim Training Ground

18 September 2017	Maccabi Haifa	3 – 2	Hapoel Nazareth Illit	Haifa
	Caio 51', 52'; Awaed 80'	Report	Dayan 13'; Eias Arraf 75'	Stadium: Kfar Galim Training Ground

16 November 2017	Maccabi Haifa	0 – 2	Ironi Kiryat Shmona	Haifa
			Yehezkel 68'; Weissman 85'	Stadium: Kfar Galim Training Ground

19 March 2018	Maccabi Haifa	7 – 1	Ironi Tiberias	Haifa
				Stadium: Kfar Galim Training Ground

== Competitions ==
=== Overall ===
Competition	Started round	Current position / round	Final position / round	First match	Last match
Ligat Ha'Al	Matchday 1	–	10th	21 August 2017	13 May 2018
State Cup	Round of 32	–	Quarter final	7 January 2018	1 March 2018
Toto Cup	Group stage	–	Semi-final	29 July 2017	30 November 2017

=== Overview ===
Competition	Record							
Competition	G	W	D	L	GF	GA	GD	Win %
Ligat Ha'Al	33	10	8	15	38	39	−1	30.30
State Cup	4	1	3	0	7	4	+3	25.00
Toto Cup	6	2	3	1	12	7	+5	33.33
Total	43	13	15	15	47	50	−3	30.23

== Ligat Ha'Al ==
=== Regular season ===
Win Draw Loss

21 August 2017 1	Bnei Yehuda Tel Aviv	2 – 0	Maccabi Haifa	Petah Tikva
20:30	Valskis (yellow card) 3'; Hozez 74', 90+2'	Report	Kahat (yellow card) 72'; Vermouth (penalty missed) 89; Mizrahi (yellow card) 90'	Stadium: HaMoshava Stadium; Attendance: 7,500; Referee: Eli Hacmon

27 August 2017 2	Maccabi Haifa	3 – 1	Hapoel Be'er Sheva	Haifa
20:30	Keinan (yellow card) 4'; Rukavytsya 30', (penalty missed) 53; Sallalich 48'; Alberman (yellow card) 59'; Glazer (yellow card) 86'; Vermouth (yellow card) 90'; Damari 90+4'	Report	Taha (red card) 54'; Einbinder 65', (yellow card) 66'	Stadium: Sammy Ofer Stadium; Attendance: 27,180; Referee: Eitan Shmuelevitz

10 September 2017 3	Hapoel Acre	2 – 0	Maccabi Haifa	Acre
20:15	Azubel 54'; Mulić 90', (yellow card) 90'	Report		Stadium: Acre Municipal Stadium; Attendance: 5,000; Referee: Daniel Bar Natan

16 September 2017 4	Maccabi Haifa	4 – 2	Hapoel Ra'anana	Haifa
19:00	Ben Harush 25'; Sallalich 34'; Kostadinov 48'; Rukavytsya 73'	Report	Babayev (yellow card) 29'; Mohammed Shaker (yellow card) 45'; Jordan Faucher 86'; Glazer 90' (o.g.)	Stadium: Sammy Ofer Stadium; Attendance: 16,437; Referee: Igal Ferid

24 September 2017 5	Maccabi Tel Aviv	0 – 0	Maccabi Haifa	Netanya
21:00	Ben Haim (red card) 44'	Report	Allyson (yellow card) 34'; Lavi (yellow card) 59'; Ben Harush (red card) 80'	Stadium: Netanya Stadium; Attendance: 12,389; Referee: Alon Yefet

1 October 2017 6	Maccabi Haifa	1 – 0	F.C. Ashdod	Haifa
21:00	Rukavytsya (yellow card) 32'; Mizrahi 45'; Caio (yellow card) 90+4'	Report	Tom Ben Zaken (yellow card) 30'; Nir Bardea (red card) 35'	Stadium: Sammy Ofer Stadium; Attendance: 15,932; Referee: Sahlomi Ben-Avraham

14 October 2017 7	Maccabi Petah Tikva	2 – 2	Maccabi Haifa	Petah Tikva
18:00	Cohen 14'; Tadé (red card) 63'; Solomon 56'; Pires (yellow card) 80'; Obieda Khateb (yellow card) 87'	Report	Rukavytsya 62'; Kahat 70'; Awaed (yellow card) 90+5'	Stadium: HaMoshava Stadium; Attendance: 6,000; Referee: Liran Liany

21 October 2017 8	Maccabi Haifa	1 – 2	Beitar Jerusalem	Haifa
20:30	Allyson (yellow card) 42'; Ben Harush (yellow card) 49'; Kostadinov (yellow card) 84'; Athanasiadis 90+5'	Report	Shechter 45'; Allyson 65' (o.g.); Paul Edgar (yellow card) 78'; Klaiman (yellow card) 90'	Stadium: Sammy Ofer Stadium; Attendance: 28,114; Referee: Eitan Shmuelevitz

28 October 2017 9	Ironi Kiryat Shmona	1 – 0	Maccabi Haifa	Kiryat Shmona
18:15	Eden Shamir (yellow card) 56'; Abed 68'	Report	Kahat (yellow card) 62'	Stadium: Municipal Stadium; Attendance: 2,800; Referee: Daniel Bar Natan

5 November 2017 10	Maccabi Haifa	2 – 0	Bnei Sakhnin	Haifa
21:00	Keinan (yellow card) 30'; Ben Harush 45'; Caio (yellow card) 46'; Damari 61'	Report	Khalaila (yellow card) 37'; Maroon Gantus (red card) 51'	Stadium: Sammy Ofer Stadium; Attendance: 16,239; Referee: Eli Hacmon

25 November 2017 11	Maccabi Netanya	1 – 1	Maccabi Haifa	Netanya
20:30	Olsak (yellow card) 11'; Mohamed (yellow card) 43'; Levy 45' (pen.); Keita (yellow card) 86'	Report	Kostadinov (yellow card) 7'; Gershon (yellow card) 45'; Sallalich 66'; Keinan (yellow card) 86'; Glazer (yellow card) 86'; Kahat (yellow card) 90'	Stadium: Netanya Stadium; Attendance: 12,500; Referee: Erez Papir

4 December 2017 12	Hapoel Haifa	1 – 0	Maccabi Haifa	Haifa
21:00	Gînsari 12', (yellow card) 44'; Arel (yellow card) 53'; Serdal (yellow card) 88'	Report	Mabouka (yellow card) 60'	Stadium: Sammy Ofer Stadium; Attendance: 23,475; Referee: Menashe Mashiah

9 December 2017 13	Maccabi Haifa	1 – 1	Hapoel Ashkelon	Haifa
18:15	Alberman (yellow card) 41'; Rukavytsya 62'	Report	Ivančić 76'; Smiljanić (yellow card) 77'; Ajayi (yellow card) 83'	Stadium: Sammy Ofer Stadium; Attendance: 14,576; Referee: Daniel Bar Natan

16 December 2017 14	Maccabi Haifa	0 – 2	Bnei Yehuda Tel Aviv	Haifa
20:30	Sallalich (yellow card) 4'; Levi (yellow card) 79'	Report	Mori 31'; Ashkenazi (yellow card) 33'; Cohen 51', (yellow card) 54'	Stadium: Sammy Ofer Stadium; Attendance: 16,934; Referee: Liran Liany

23 December 2017 15	Hapoel Be'er Sheva	2 – 0	Maccabi Haifa	Be'er Sheva
21:00	Allyson 10' (o.g.); Sahar (yellow card) 67'; Ogu (yellow card) 77'; Nwakaeme 89'	Report	Awaed (yellow card) 7'; Sallalich (yellow card) 23'; Levi (yellow card) 45'	Stadium: Terner Stadium; Attendance: 15,417; Referee: Erez Papir

30 December 2017 16	Maccabi Haifa	0 – 1	Hapoel Acre	Haifa
18:15	Allyson (yellow card) 36'; Sallalich (yellow card) 81'	Report	Azubel 31', (yellow card) 52'; Gabriel Knaykovski (yellow card) 45'; Strauss (yellow card) 54'; El Krenawy (yellow card) 62'	Stadium: Sammy Ofer Stadium; Attendance: 13,000; Referee: Alon Yefet

10 January 2018 17	Hapoel Ra'anana	0 – 3	Maccabi Haifa	Netanya
20:30	Nikolić (yellow card) 41'; Vehava (red card) 75'; Babayev (yellow card) 80'	Report	Sallalich 38', 69'; Awaed (yellow card) 56'; Rukavytsya 76'; Azulay (yellow card) 84'; Athanasiadis (yellow card) 86'	Stadium: Netanya Stadium; Attendance: 2,300; Referee: Sahlomi Ben-Avraham

15 January 2018 18	Maccabi Haifa	1 – 3	Maccabi Tel Aviv	Haifa
21:00	Levi (yellow card) 19'; Rukavytsya 66'; Gershon (yellow card) 68'; Allyson (yellow card) 74'	Report	Kjartansson 1', 54'; Tibi (yellow card) 65'; Battocchio 85'	Stadium: Sammy Ofer Stadium; Attendance: 22,472; Referee: Ziv Adler

20 January 2018 19	F.C. Ashdod	0 – 0	Maccabi Haifa	Ashdod
18:15	Yuval Jakobovich (yellow card) 45'	Report	Azulay (yellow card) 90+1'	Stadium: Yud-Alef Stadium; Attendance: 3,000; Referee: Liran Liany

27 January 2018 20	Maccabi Haifa	1 – 1	Maccabi Petah Tikva	Haifa
18:15	Rukavytsya 40'; Mizrahi (yellow card) 65'	Report	Yaniv Brik (yellow card) 13'; Cohen 36'; Pires (yellow card) 69'	Stadium: Sammy Ofer Stadium; Attendance: 12,127; Referee: Alon Yefet

3 February 2018 21	Beitar Jerusalem	3 – 1	Maccabi Haifa	Jerusalem
20:30	Shechter (penalty missed) 8, 69'; Varenne 45+1'; Claudemir (yellow card) 50'; Sabo 53'	Report	Mizrahi 35'; Athanasiadis (yellow card) 45'	Stadium: Teddy Stadium; Attendance: 10,443; Referee: Ziv Adler

10 February 2018 22	Maccabi Haifa	4 – 0	Ironi Kiryat Shmona	Haifa
18:15	Mabouka (yellow card) 27'; Kahat 72'; Mizrahi 87', 90+2'; Sallalich 88'	Report	Cuéllar (yellow card) 40'; Shaker (yellow card) 47'; Abu Abaid (yellow card) 66'; Menahem (yellow card) 69'; Brossou (red card) 79'; Weissman (yellow card) 84'	Stadium: Sammy Ofer Stadium; Attendance: 12,063; Referee: Roi Reinshreiber

17 February 2018 23	Bnei Sakhnin	1 – 0	Maccabi Haifa	Acre
18:15	Azulay 23'; Jaber (yellow card) 27'; Obeida Khateb (yellow card) 30'; Maroon Gantus (yellow card) 72'; Ottman (yellow card) 90+4'	Report	Athanasiadis (yellow card) 90+3'; Reijnen (yellow card) 90+4'	Stadium: Acre Municipal Stadium; Attendance: 3,500; Referee: Tzvika Levi

24 February 2018 24	Maccabi Haifa	1 – 2	Maccabi Netanya	Haifa
18:15	Ben Harush 22', (yellow card) 25'; Azulay (yellow card) 37'	Report	Viki Kahlon 25'; Levy 35' (pen.), (yellow card) 55'; Amos (yellow card) 90+2'; Azulay (yellow card) 85'	Stadium: Sammy Ofer Stadium; Attendance: 14,467; Referee: Daniel Bar Natan

5 March 2018 25	Maccabi Haifa	0 – 3	Hapoel Haifa	Haifa
21:00	Mizrahi (yellow card) 59'} Azulay (yellow card) 85'; Awaed (yellow card) 90'	Report	Mabouka 44' (o.g.); Tamaș 55'; Kapiloto (yellow card) 59'; Turgeman 65'	Stadium: Sammy Ofer Stadium; Attendance: Ziv Adler; Referee: 10,132

10 March 2018 26	Hapoel Ashkelon	0 – 0	Maccabi Haifa	Ashkelon
19:00	Malka (yellow card) 75'; Haddad (yellow card) 79'	Report	Gershon (yellow card) 78'	Stadium: Sala Stadium; Attendance: 3,200; Referee: Alon Yefet

==== Regular season table ====
Pos	Team	Pld	W	D	L	GF	GA	GD	Pts	Qualification or relegation
8	Ironi Kiryat Shmona	26	9	5	12	28	30	−2	32	Qualification for the Relegation round
9	Bnei Sakhnin	26	8	6	12	24	35	−11	30	Qualification for the Relegation round
10	Maccabi Haifa	26	6	7	13	26	33	−7	25	Qualification for the Relegation round
11	Hapoel Ra'anana	26	6	6	14	23	40	−17	24	Qualification for the Relegation round
12	F.C. Ashdod	26	4	9	13	22	39	−17	21	Qualification for the Relegation round

Source: Israel Football Association, Soccerway
Rules for classification: 1) Points; 2) Goal difference; 3) Matches won; 4) Goals scored; 5) Head-to-head points; 6) Head-to-head goal difference; 7) Head-to-head goals scored; 8) Play-off.

==== Results overview ====
Win Draw Loss

Opposition	Home score	Away score
Beitar Jerusalem	1-2	1-3
Bnei Sakhnin	2-0	0-1
Bnei Yehuda Tel Aviv	0-2	0-2
F.C. Ashdod	1-0	0-0
Hapoel Acre	0-2	0-1
Hapoel Ashkelon	1-1	0-0
Hapoel Be'er Sheva	3-1	0-2
Hapoel Haifa	0-1	0-3
Hapoel Ra'anana	4-2	0-3
Hapoel Ironi Kiryat Shmona	0-1	4-0
Maccabi Netanya	1-1	1-2
Maccabi Petah Tikva	2-2	1-1
Maccabi Tel Aviv	0-0	1-3

=== Play-off ===
17 March 2018 27	Maccabi Haifa	4 – 0	Hapoel Acre	Haifa
16:00	Rukavytsya 19', 50'; Kostadinov (yellow card) 30'; Sallalich 64'; Awaed 90+1'	Report	Amid Mahajna (yellow card) 28'; Abdi Farhat (yellow card) 48'; Zino (yellow card) 38'	Stadium: Sammy Ofer Stadium; Attendance: 6,982; Referee: Eitan Shmuelevitz

7 April 2018 28	F.C. Ashdod	2 – 1	Maccabi Haifa	Ashdod
20:30	Dor Jan 45'; Mauricio (yellow card) 60'; Tom Mond (yellow card) 77'; Inbrum 87' (pen.); Tom Ben Zaken (yellow card) 89'; Shahar Piven (yellow card) 90+2'	Report	Allyson (yellow card) 36'; Rukavytsya 70' (pen.); Mabouka (yellow card) 86'; Azulay (yellow card) 87'	Stadium: Yud-Alef Stadium; Attendance: 1,000; Referee: Tzvika Levi

14 April 2018 29	Maccabi Haifa	2 – 1	Hapoel Ashkelon	Haifa
20:30	Kahat 25', (yellow card) 67'; Caio 86'; Alberman (yellow card) 90+1'	Report	Manga 37'	Stadium: Sammy Ofer Stadium; Attendance: 7,314; Referee: Alon Yefet

21 April 2018 30	Maccabi Petah Tikva	0 – 1	Maccabi Haifa	Petah Tikva
18:00	Zhairi (yellow card) 39'; Sivok (yellow card) 70'; Tadé (yellow card) 90+3'	Report	Allyson (yellow card) 2'; Azulay 13'; Alberman (yellow card) 53'; Mizrahi (yellow card) 65'; Gershon (yellow card) 84'	Stadium: HaMoshava Stadium; Attendance: 2,500; Referee: Idan Leiba

28 April 2018 31	Maccabi Haifa	1 – 2	Ironi Kiryat Shmona	Haifa
18:00	Gershon (yellow card) 61'; Mizrahi 88'	Report	Davidov 41'; Ryan 71'; Hasselbaink (yellow card) 90+3'	Stadium: Sammy Ofer Stadium; Attendance: 8,211; Referee: Roi Reinshreiber

5 May 2018 32	Bnei Sakhnin	1 – 1	Maccabi Haifa	Sakhnin
20:15	Obeida Khateb (red card) 37'; Avidor (yellow card) 67'; Mugrabi 90+3' (pen.)	Report	Kostadinov 87'	Stadium: Doha Stadium; Attendance: 600; Referee: Idan Leiba

13 May 2018 33	Maccabi Haifa	2 – 0	Hapoel Ra'anana	Haifa
20:00	Caio (yellow card) 29'; Alberman (yellow card) 29'; Mizrahi 52'; Lavi (yellow card) 67'; Zenati 89', (red card) 90+1'	Report		Stadium: Sammy Ofer Stadium; Attendance: 5,098; Referee: David Foxman

==== Relegation round table ====
Pos	Team	Pld	W	D	L	GF	GA	GD	Pts	Relegation
7	Ironi Kiryat Shmona	33	13	6	14	39	36	+3	45	
8	Maccabi Petah Tikva	33	12	7	14	40	44	−4	43	
9	Hapoel Ra'anana	33	11	7	15	36	45	−9	40	
10	Maccabi Haifa	33	10	8	15	38	39	−1	38	
11	Bnei Sakhnin	33	10	8	15	32	47	−15	38	
12	F.C. Ashdod	33	6	10	17	29	48	−19	28	
13	Hapoel Ashkelon (R)	33	4	9	20	23	51	−28	21	Relegation to Liga Leumit
14	Hapoel Acre (Note: Hapoel Acre were deducted 2 points; 2 were deducted points due to violations of contract rules (reduced from the original 3 point deduction) and another 2 points due fielding 6 foreigners in a match against Maccabi Petah Tikva on fixture 10(was returned on the 20th of December).) (R)	33	6	4	23	26	67	−41	20	Relegation to Liga Leumit

Source: Israel Football Association, Soccerway
Rules for classification: 1) Points; 2) Goal difference; 3) Matches won; 4) Goals scored; 5) Head-to-head points; 6) Head-to-head goal difference; 7) Head-to-head goals scored; 8) Play-off.
(R) Relegated

==== Results overview ====
Win Draw Loss

Opposition	Home score	Away score
Bnei Sakhnin		1-1
F.C. Ashdod		1-2
Hapoel Acre	4-0	
Hapoel Ashkelon	2-1	
Hapoel Ra'anana	2-0	
Hapoel Ironi Kiryat Shmona	1-2	
Maccabi Petah Tikva		0-1

=== Results summary ===
Overall								Home						Away					
Pld	W	D	L	GF	GA	GD	Pts	W	D	L	GF	GA	GD	W	D	L	GF	GA	GD
33	10	8	15	38	39	−1	38	8	2	7	28	21	+7	2	6	8	10	18	−8

Last updated: 14 May 2018.
Source: Competitive matches

=== Results by round ===
Round	1	2	3	4	5	6	7	8	9	10	11	12	13	14	15	16	17	18	19	20	21	22	23	24	25	26	27	28	29	30	31	32	33
Ground	A	H	A	H	A	H	A	H	A	H	A	A	H	H	A	H	A	H	A	H	A	H	A	H	H	A	H	A	H	A	H	A	H
Result	L	W	L	W	D	W	D	L	L	W	D	L	D	L	L	L	W	L	D	D	L	W	L	L	L	D	W	L	W	W	L	D	W
Position	12	5	9	7	8	5	6	6	8	6	7	8	8	9	9	9	9	10	10	10	10	9	10	10	10	10	10	10	10	9	10	10	10

Updated to match(es) played on 14 May 2018. Source: Competitive matches
A = Away; H = Home; W = Win; D = Draw; L = Loss

== State Cup ==
=== Round of 32 ===
7 January 2018 Round of 32	Hapoel Tel Aviv	1 – 1 (a.e.t.) (3 – 5 p)	Maccabi Haifa	Petah Tikva
20:30	Hirsh (yellow card) 6'; Raz Shlomo; Ostvind 27' (pen.), (yellow card) 31'; Dgani (yellow card) 34'; Barshazki (yellow card) 96'	Report	Rukavytsya 11'; Mizrahi (yellow card) 60'; Athanasiadis (yellow card) 96'	Stadium: HaMoshava Stadium; Attendance: 10,500; Referee: Liran Liany
	Penalties
	Agayev (penalty scored); Daniel Gretz (penalty missed); Idan Cohen (penalty scored); Ostvind (penalty scored)		Alberman (penalty scored); Rukavytsya (penalty scored); Caio (penalty scored); Gershon (penalty scored); Athanasiadis (penalty scored)

=== Round of 16 ===
24 January 2018 Round of 16	Maccabi Haifa	3-0	Maccabi Tel Aviv	Haifa
21:00	Kehat 54'; Sallalich 57'; Rukavytsya 76'; Glazer (yellow card) 80'	Report	Dor Peretz (yellow card) 76'	Stadium: Sammy Ofer Stadium; Attendance: 14,424; Referee: Eli Hacmon

=== Quarter final ===
6 February 2018 First leg	Maccabi Haifa	2 – 2	Hapoel Haifa	Haifa
21:00	Rukavytsya 11'; Sallalich 15'; Mabouka (yellow card) 37'; Mizrahi (yellow card) 73'; Allyson (yellow card) 75'	Report	Turgeman 57'; Arel (yellow card) 71'; Tamaș 76'; Mitrevski (yellow card) 90+2'	Stadium: Sammy Ofer Stadium; Attendance: 19,216; Referee: Eitan Shmulevich

1 March 2018 Second leg	Hapoel Haifa	1 – 1	Maccabi Haifa	Haifa
20:50	Turgeman (yellow card) 13', (goal) 45'; Tamaș (yellow card) 55'; Ivančić (yellow card) 69'; Šetkus (yellow card) 78'; Malul (yellow card) 8'	Report	Azulay 21', (yellow card) 69'; Sallalich (yellow card) 34'; Kostadinov (yellow card) 58'	Stadium: Sammy Ofer Stadium; Attendance: 17,500; Referee: Liran Liany

3-3 on aggregate. Hapoel Haifa won on away goals.

== Toto Cup ==
=== Group stage ===
29 July 2017 1	Bnei Sakhnin	1 – 4	Maccabi Haifa	Acre
19:00	Mahmmoud Baderana 50'; Ottman (red card) 72'	Report	Keinan 27'; Atar 37' (pen.), 75', (yellow card) 69'; Vermouth 83' (pen.); Kostadinov (yellow card) 89'	Stadium: Acre Municipal Stadium; Attendance: 3,000; Referee: Orel Grennfeld

5 August 2017 3	Maccabi Haifa	0 – 0	Hapoel Ironi Kiryat Shmona	Haifa
21:00	Mizrahi (yellow card) 36'	Report		Stadium: Sammy Ofer Stadium; Attendance: 11,345; Referee: Eli Hacmon

8 August 2017 4	Hapoel Haifa	1 – 4	Maccabi Haifa	Haifa
21:00	Rukavytsya 5' (pen.), 25'; Allyson (yellow card) 15'; Keinan (yellow card) 20'; Kahat 59', 62'	Report	Sjöstedt (red card) 3'; Kapiloto 75', (yellow card) 85'	Stadium: Sammy Ofer Stadium; Attendance: 6,000; Referee: Ziv Adler

13 August 2017 5	Maccabi Haifa	2 – 2	Hapoel Acre	Haifa
21:00	Caio 20'; Vermouth 51'; Meir (yellow card) 45'	Report	Shish (yellow card) 11'; El Krenawy 68'; Mulić 85'	Stadium: Sammy Ofer Stadium; Attendance: 7,112; Referee: Igal Ferid

Pos	Team	Pld	W	D	L	GF	GA	GD	Pts	Qualification or relegation
1	Maccabi Haifa	4	2	2	0	10	4	+6	8	Qualified to Quarter-finals
2	Hapoel Acre	4	2	1	1	5	7	−2	7	Qualified to Quarter-finals
3	Hapoel Kiryat Shmona	4	1	2	1	5	2	+3	5	Qualified to Quarter-finals
4	Hapoel Haifa	4	1	1	2	3	6	−3	4	
5	Bnei Sakhnin	4	0	2	2	4	8	−4	2	

Updated to match(es) played on 13 August 2017. Source: Israel Football Association
Rules for classification: 1) points; 2) goal difference; 3) number of wins; 4) goals scored; 5) head to head; 6)deciding match.

==== Quarter-final ====
24 October 2017	Maccabi Haifa	2 – 2 (a.e.t.) (4 – 3 p)	Hapoel Acre	Haifa
21:00	Caio 21'; Lavi (yellow card) 31', (goal) 99'; Athanasiadis (yellow card) 89'; Meir (yellow card) 90'	Report	Bitton (yellow card) 2'; Peter Onyekachi 69'; Zino (yellow card) 89'; El Krenawy 109'	Stadium: Sammy Ofer Stadium; Attendance: 1,500; Referee: Idan Leiba
	Penalties
	Awaed (penalty scored); Alberman (penalty scored); Sallalich (penalty scored); Kahat (penalty scored)		Azubel (penalty missed); Sam (penalty scored); El Krenawy (penalty scored); Yinon Eliyahu (penalty scored); Zino (penalty missed)

==== Semi-final ====
30 November 2017 Semi-Final	Maccabi Haifa	0 – 1	Hapoel Be'er Sheva	Netanya
21:00	Ben Harush (yellow card) 19'; Keinan (yellow card) 40'; Kostadinov (yellow card) 81'	Report	Ohana 71'; Brown (yellow card) 82'	Stadium: Netanya Stadium; Attendance: 2,800; Referee: Daniel Bar Natan

== Statistics ==
=== Squad statistics ===
Updated on 15 May 2018

			Ligat Ha'Al					State Cup					Toto Cup					Total				
Nation	No.	Name		GS	Min.	Goal	Assist		GS	Min.	Goal	Assist		GS	Min.	Goal	Assist		GS	Min.	Goal	Assist
Goalkeepers
(Israel)	1	Ohad Levita	9	9	851	0	0	1	0	49	0	0	2	2	191	0	0	12	11	1,091	0	0
(Israel)	22	Gil Ofek	1	1	94	0	0	0	0	0	0	0	0	0	0	0	0	1	1	94	0	0
(Israel)	55	Omri Glazer	24	24	2,299	0	0	4	4	406	0	0	4	4	406	0	0	30	30	3,070	0	0
Defenders
(Brazil)	2	Allyson	31	31	2,903	0	0	4	4	414	0	0	4	3	343	0	0	39	38	3,660	0	0
(Netherlands)	4	Etiënne Reijnen	9	5	653	0	0	0	0	0	0	0	0	0	0	0	0	9	5	653	0	0
(Israel)	5	Rami Gershon	27	27	2,428	0	0	4	4	414	0	0	2	2	140	0	0	33	33	2,982	0	0
(Israel)	23	Omri Ben Harush	17	17	1,357	3	0	3	3	268	0	0	5	4	419	0	0	25	24	2,044	3	0
(Israel)	25	Raz Meir	16	16	1,494	0	1	2	1	178	0	0	6	3	356	0	0	24	20	2,028	0	1
(Cameroon)	26	Ernest Mabouka	27	26	2,455	0	3	3	3	236	0	0	4	3	294	0	1	34	32	2,985	0	4
(Israel)	40	Yonatan Levi	8	7	756	0	0	2	1	145	0	0	0	0	0	0	0	10	8	901	0	0
Midfielders
(Israel)	6	Gal Alberman	28	27	2,422	0	0	3	3	318	0	0	5	4	385	0	0	36	34	3,125	0	0
(Israel)	7	Sintayehu Sallalich	33	32	2,940	7	9	4	4	374	2	0	2	1	109	0	0	39	37	3,423	9	9
(Israel)	10	Shlomi Azulay	19	12	1,176	1	7	4	2	196	1	0	0	0	0	0	0	23	14	1,372	2	7
(Israel)	11	Maor Buzaglo	5	3	263	0	0	0	0	0	0	0	1	0	22	0	0	6	3	285	0	0
(Brazil)	18	Caio	23	13	2,413	1	1	1	1	37	0	0	5	4	378	2	0	29	17	2,828	3	1
(Israel)	19	Roi Kahat	29	25	2,160	3	0	4	4	357	1	1	6	5	460	2	0	39	34	2,977	6	1
(Israel)	31	Neta Lavi	7	3	437	0	0	0	0	0	0	0	4	2	270	1	0	11	5	707	1	0
(Bulgaria)	70	Georgi Kostadinov	25	22	1,965	2	0	3	3	273	0	1	5	4	338	0	0	33	29	2,576	2	1
Forwards
(Israel)	8	Ofir Mizrahi	22	8	942	6	2	4	0	138	0	0	4	3	229	0	3	30	11	1,309	6	5
(Israel)	9	Mohammed Awaed	17	5	571	1	0	2	1	116	0	1	2	1	93	0	1	21	7	780	1	2
(Australia) (Israel)	13	Nikita Rukavytsya	33	29	2,627	10	1	4	4	386	3	1	4	3	276	2	0	41	36	3,289	15	2
(Israel)	16	Omer Damari	18	10	990	2	3	2	2	160	0	1	3	1	90	0	0	23	13	1,240	2	4
(Israel)	32	Amit Zenati	3	0	80	0	0	0	0	0	0	0	0	0	0	0	0	3	0	80	1	0
(Greece)	33	Stefanos Athanasiadis	16	10	983	1	0	2	1	185	0	0	2	1	150	0	0	20	12	1,318	1	0
Players who no longer play for Maccabi Haifa
(Israel)	3	Shay Ben David	2	1	113	0	0	0	0	0	0	0	1	1	96	0	0	3	2	209	0	0
(Israel)	7	Sun Menahem	0	0	0	0	0	0	0	0	0	0	3	2	163	0	0	3	2	163	0	0
(Israel)	9	Shon Weissman	1	1	96	0	0	0	0	0	0	0	3	2	192	0	0	4	3	288	0	0
(Israel)	14	Gili Vermouth	14	6	682	0	2	0	0	0	0	0	6	2	315	1	1	20	8	997	1	3
(Israel)	16	Eliran Atar	0	0	0	0	0	0	0	0	0	0	2	1	121	2	0	2	1	121	2	0
(Israel)	21	Dekel Keinan	8	6	599	0	0	0	0	0	0	0	5	5	425	1	0	12	11	1,015	1	0
(Israel)	35	Eitan Velblum	0	0	0	0	0	0	0	0	0	0	1	0	30	0	0	1	0	30	0	0
(Israel)	36	Mohammad Abu Fani	0	0	0	0	0	0	0	0	0	0	2	1	71	0	0	2	1	71	0	0

=== Goals ===
Updated on 7 May 2018

Rank	Player	Position	Ligat Ha'Al	State Cup	Toto Cup	Total
1	(Australia) Nikita Rukavytsya	FW	10	3	2	15
2	(Israel) Sintayehu Sallalich	MF	7	2	0	9
3	(Israel) Roi Kahat	MF	3	1	2	6
3	(Israel) Ofir Mizrahi	FW	6	0	0	6
5	(Israel) Omri Ben Harush	DF	3	0	0	3
5	(Brazil) Caio	MF	1	0	2	3
6	(Israel) Omer Damari	FW	2	0	0	2
6	(Israel) Shlomi Azulay	MF	1	1	0	2
6	(Bulgaria) Georgi Kostadinov	MF	2	0	0	2
7	(Greece) Stefanos Athanasiadis	FW	1	0	0	1
7	(Israel) Mohammed Awaed	FW	1	0	0	1
7	(Israel) Amit Zenati	FW	1	0	0	1
7	(Israel) Neta Lavi	MF	0	0	1	1
Players who no longer play for Maccabi Haifa
	(Israel) Gili Vermouth	MF	0	0	2	2
	(Israel) Eliran Atar	FW	0	0	2	2
	(Israel) Dekel Keinan	DF	0	0	1	1

=== Clean sheets ===
Updated on 14 May 2018

Rank	Pos.	No.	Name	Ligat Ha'Al	State Cup	Toto Cup	Total
1	GK	55	(Israel) Omri Glazer	6	1	1	8
2	GK	1	(Israel) Ohad Levita	4			4

=== Disciplinary record (Ligat Ha'Al and State Cup) ===
Updated on 14 May 2018

No.	Pos	Nat	Name	Ligat Ha'Al			State Cup			Total		
No.	Pos	Nat	Name	Booked	(yellow card) (yellow-red card)	Sent off (straight red)	Booked	(yellow card) (yellow-red card)	Sent off (straight red)	Booked	(yellow card) (yellow-red card)	Sent off (straight red)
2	DF	(Brazil)	Allyson	6			1			7		
10	MF	(Israel)	Shlomi Azulay	5			1			6		
8	FW	(Israel)	Ofir Mizrahi	3			2			5		
5	DF	(Israel)	Rami Gershon	5						5		
6	MF	(Israel)	Gal Alberman	5						5		
70	MF	(Bulgaria)	Georgi Kostadinov	3			1			4		
7	FW	(Israel)	Sintayehu Sallalich	3			1			4		
19	MF	(Israel)	Roi Kahat	4						4		
9	FW	(Israel)	Mohammed Awaed	4						4		
26	DF	(Cameroon)	Ernest Mabouka	3			1			4		
40	DF	(Israel)	Yonatan Levi	3						3		
55	GK	(Israel)	Omri Glazer	2			1			3		
33	FW	(Greece)	Stefanos Athanasiadis	3						3		
18	MF	(Brazil)	Caio	3						3		
31	MF	(Israel)	Neta Lavi	2						2		
23	DF	(Israel)	Omri Ben Harush	2	1					2	1	
32	FW	(Israel)	Amit Zenati	1	1					1	1	
13	FW	(Australia)	Nikita Rukavytsya	1						1		
4	DF	(Netherlands)	Etiënne Reijnen	1						1		
Players who no longer play for Maccabi Haifa
21	DF	(Israel)	Dekel Keinan	3						3		
14	MF	(Israel)	Gili Vermouth	1						1		

=== Disciplinary record (Toto Cup) ===
Updated on 9 February 2018

No.	Pos	Nat	Name	Toto Cup		
No.	Pos	Nat	Name	Booked	(yellow card) (yellow-red card)	Sent off (straight red)
70	MF	(Bulgaria)	Georgi Kostadinov	2		
21	DF	(Israel)	Dekel Keinan	2		
25	DF	(Israel)	Raz Meir	2		
16	FW	(Israel)	Eliran Atar	1		
8	MF	(Israel)	Ofir Mizrahi	1		
2	DF	(Brazil)	Allyson	1		
31	MF	(Israel)	Neta Lavi	1		
33	FW	(Greece)	Stefanos Athanasiadis	1		
23	DF	(Israel)	Omri Ben Harush	1		

=== Suspensions ===
Updated on Updated on 7 February 2018

Player	Date Received	Offence	Length of suspension		
Omri Ben Harush	24 September 2017	(red card) 80' vs Maccabi Tel Aviv	1 Match	F.C. Ashdod (H)	1 October 20176
Allyson	6 February 2018	(yellow card) 75' vs Hapoel Haifa	1 Match	Bnei Sakhnin (A)	17 February 2018
Ofir Mizrahi	6 March 2018	(yellow card) 59' vs Hapoel Haifa	1 Match	Hapoel Acre (H)	17 March 2018
Shlomi Azulay	6 March 2018	(yellow card) 85' vs Hapoel Haifa	1 Match	Hapoel Acre (H)	17 March 2018
Rami Gershon	28 April 2018	(yellow card) 61' vs Hapoel Ironi Kiryat Shmona	1 Match	Hapoel Ra'anana (H)	12 May 2018

=== Overall ===
	Total	Home	Away	Natural
Games played	43	22	20	1
Games won	13	9	4	0
Games drawn	14	6	8	0
Games lost	16	7	8	1
Biggest win	4-0 vs Hapoel Ironi Kiryat Shmona; 4-0 vs Hapoel Acre	4-0 vs Hapoel Ironi Kiryat Shmona; 4-0 vs Hapoel Acre	4-1 vs Bnei Sakhnin; 4-1 Hapoel Haifa; 3-0 Hapoel Ra'anana	-
Biggest loss	0-3 vs Hapoel Haifa	0-3 vs Hapoel Haifa	0-2 vs Bnei Yehuda Tel Aviv; 0-2 vs Hapoel Acre; 0-2 Hapoel Be'er Sheva; 1-3 Beitar Jerusalem	0-1 Hapoel Be'er Sheva
Biggest win (League)	4-0 vs Hapoel Ironi Kiryat Shmona; 4-0 vs Hapoel Acre	4-0 vs Hapoel Ironi Kiryat Shmona; 4-0 vs Hapoel Acre	3-0 Hapoel Ra'anana	-
Biggest loss (League)	0-3 vs Hapoel Haifa	0-3 vs Hapoel Haifa	0-2 vs Bnei Yehuda Tel Aviv; 0-2 vs Hapoel Acre; 0-2 Hapoel Be'er Sheva; 1-3 Beitar Jerusalem	-
Biggest win (Cup)	3-0 Maccabi Tel Aviv	3-0 Maccabi Tel Aviv	-	-
Biggest loss (Cup)	-	-	-	-
Biggest win (Toto)	4-1 vs Bnei Sakhnin; 4-1 Hapoel Haifa	-	4-1 vs Bnei Sakhnin; 4-1 Hapoel Haifa	-
Biggest loss (Toto)	0-1 Hapoel Be'er Sheva	-	-	0-1 Hapoel Be'er Sheva
Goals scored	57	37	20	0
Goals conceded	50	27	22	1
Goal difference	+7	+10	-2	-1
Clean sheets	12	7	5	-
Average GF per game	1.33	1.68	1	0
Average GA per game	1.16	1.23	1.1	1
Yellow cards	84	42	39	3
Red cards	2	1	1	-
Most appearances	-			
Most minutes played	-			
Most goals	Nikita Rukavytsya (15)			
Penalties for	6	1	5	-
Penalties against	6	1	5	-
Winning rate	30.23%	40.91%	20%	0%

Last updated: Updated on 14 May 2018
Source: Competitive matches
