= 2017–18 Maccabi Tel Aviv F.C. season =

Maccabi Tel Aviv
2017–18 season
- Chairman: Mitchell Goldhar
- Manager: Jordi Cruyff
- Stadium: Netanya Stadium (temporary)
- Premier League: 2nd
- State Cup: Round of 16
- Toto Cup: Winners
- UEFA Europa League: Group stage
- Top goalscorer: League: Vidar Orn Kjartansson (13); All: Vidar Orn Kjartansson (21)
Home colours	Away colours	Third colours

The 2017–18 season was Maccabi Tel Aviv's 111th season since its establishment in 1906, and 70th since the establishment of the State of Israel. During the 2017–18 campaign the club competed in the Israeli Premier League, State Cup, Toto Cup, UEFA Europa League.

== First team ==
Note: Flags indicate national team as defined under FIFA eligibility rules; some limited exceptions apply. Players may hold more than one non-FIFA nationality.

No.	Pos.	Nation	Player
1	GK	ISR	Daniel Lifshitz
2	DF	ISR	Eli Dasa
3	DF	ISR	Yuval Spungin
5	DF	MTQ	Jean-Sylvain Babin
6	MF	ESP	José Rodríguez
7	MF	ISR	Omer Atzili
9	FW	ISL	Viðar Kjartansson
10	FW	ISR	Barak Yitzhaki
11	FW	ENG	Nick Blackman
13	MF	ISR	Sheran Yeini (Captain)
15	MF	ISR	Dor Micha
16	FW	ISR	Eliran Atar
18	DF	ISR	Eitan Tibi

No.	Pos.	Nation	Player
19	GK	BRA	Daniel Tenenbaum
20	DF	ISR	Matan Baltaxa
21	DF	BLR	Egor Filipenko
22	MF	ISR	Avi Rikan
23	MF	ISR	Eyal Golasa
25	FW	USA	Aaron Schoenfeld
26	DF	ISR	Tal Ben Haim
27	DF	ISR	Ofir Davidzada
28	MF	ITA	Cristian Battocchio
31	MF	BIH	Tino-Sven Sušić
42	MF	ISR	Dor Peretz
45	MF	ISR	Or Dasa
95	GK	SRB	Predrag Rajković

== Transfers ==
=== Summer ===
In:

No.	Pos.	Nation	Player
—	DF	ISR	Matan Baltaxa (from Hapoel Petah Tikva)
—	DF	ISR	Ofir Davidzada (on loan from (Belgium) Gent)
—	FW	ISR	Omer Atzili (from (Spain) Granada)
—	FW	ISR	Yonatan Cohen (loan return from Bnei Yehuda)
—	MF	ISR	Dor Peretz (loan return from Hapoel Haifa)
—	MF	ITA	Cristian Battocchio (from (France) Stade Brestois 29)
—	MF	BIH	Tino-Sven Sušić (on loan from (Belgium) Genk)
—	FW	ENG	Nick Blackman (on loan from (England) Derby County)
—	FW	ISR	Eliran Atar (from Maccabi Haifa)
—	MF	ESP	José Rodríguez (on loan from (Germany) 1. FSV Mainz 05)
—	DF	MTQ	Jean-Sylvain Babin (on loan from (Spain) Sporting Gijon)

Out:

No.	Pos.	Nation	Player
—	DF	BRA	Ramon (loan return to (Brazil) Vitória)
—	MF	POR	Ruben Micael (loan terutn to (China) Shijiazhuang Ever Bright F.C.)
—	MF	ISR	Gal Alberman (to Maccabi Haifa)
—	MF	ISR	Yossi Benayoun (to Beitar Jerusalem)
—	DF	ISR	Omri Ben Harush (to Maccabi Haifa)
—	FW	ISR	Tal Ben Haim DF (to (Czech Republic) AC Sparta Praha)
—	FW	ISR	Matan Hozez (on loan to Bnei Yehuda)
—	GK	ISR	Barak Levi (on loan to Hapoel Katamon Jerusalem)
—	FW	ARG	Óscar Scarione (to (Turkey) Göztepe)
—	FW	ISR	Yonatan Cohen (on loan to Bnei Yehuda)
—	MF	ISR	Eliel Peretz (on loan to Bnei Yehuda)
—	MF	BRA	Marcelo (on loan to Bnei Yehuda)

=== Winter ===
In:

No.	Pos.	Nation	Player
—	MF	ISR	Gidi Kanyuk (on loan from (Uzbekistan) Pakhtakor Tashkent)

Out:

No.	Pos.	Nation	Player
—	DF	ISR	Egor Filipenko (on loan to (Israel) F.C. Ashdod)
—	DF	ISR	Matan Baltaxa (on loan to (Israel) Hapoel Acre F.C.)
—	MF	ISR	Or Dasa (on loan to Hapoel Ra'anana)
—	MF	BIH	Tino-Sven Sušić (to (Belgium) Antwerp, his player card still belongs to (Belgium) Genk)

== Pre-season and friendlies ==
20 June 2017 Training Camp	Maccabi Tel Aviv (Israel)	1–1	(Slovakia) Trenčín	Leoben, Austria
	Azulay 75'; Kartzav (yellow card) 90'		Čataković 52'

24 June 2017 Training Camp	Maccabi Tel Aviv (Israel)	3–0	(Slovakia) Spartak Trnava	Leoben, Austria
18:00	Viðar Kjartansson 38'; Azili 50'; Schoenfeld 90'

== UEFA Europa League ==
=== First qualifying round ===
29 June 2017 First leg	Maccabi Tel Aviv (Israel)	2–0	(Albania) Tirana	Netanya, Israel
21:00	Cohen 27'; Dasa 64'		Kërçiku (yellow card) 41'; Acquah (yellow card) 51'; Sentamu (yellow card) 74'	Stadium: Netanya Stadium

6 July 2017 Second leg	Tirana (Albania)	0–3	(Israel) Maccabi Tel Aviv	Tirana, Albania
17:00	Sentamu (red card) 44'; Doka (yellow card) 90'		Davidzada (yellow card) 27'; Schoenfeld 49'; Itzhaki 80' (yellow card) 90'; Peretz (yellow card) 82'; Rikan 86'	Stadium: Selman Stërmasi Stadium

=== Second qualifying round ===
13 July 2017 First leg	Maccabi Tel Aviv (Israel)	3–1	(Iceland) KR	Netanya, Israel
18:00	Schoenfeld 65'; Kjartansson 78'; Atzili 82'		Gunnarsson (yellow card) 15'; Pálmason 85'	Stadium: Netanya Stadium

20 July 2017 First leg	KR (Iceland)	0–2	(Israel) Maccabi Tel Aviv	Reykjavík, Iceland
22:10	Friðgeirsson (yellow card) 35'		Tibi (yellow card) 15'; Atzili 57'; Peretz 66'	Stadium: KR-völlur

=== Third qualifying round ===
27 July 2017 First leg	Maccabi Tel Aviv (Israel)	1–0	(Greece) Panionios	Netanya, Israel
19:45	Kjartansson (yellow card) 25' (goal) 48'; Spungin (yellow card) 54'		Tapoko (yellow card) 30'	Stadium: Netanya Stadium

3 August 2017 Second leg	Panionios (Greece)	0–1	(Israel) Maccabi Tel Aviv	Athens, Greece
22:00	Korbos (yellow card) 58' 79' (o.g.)		Battocchio (yellow card) 37'; Golasa (yellow card) 45'; Schoenfeld (yellow card) 50'	Stadium: Nea Smyrni Stadium

=== Playoff round ===
17 August 2017 First leg	Rheindorf Altach (Austria)	0–1	(Israel) Maccabi Tel Aviv	Innsbruck, Austria
20:30	Ngamaleu (yellow card) 20'; Galvão (yellow card) 83'	Report	Kjartansson 68'; Yeini (yellow card) 83'	Stadium: Tivoli-Neu; Attendance: 5,269; Referee: Aleksei Kulbakov (Belarus)

24 August 2017 Second leg	Maccabi Tel Aviv (Israel)	2–2 (3–2 agg.)	(Austria) Rheindorf Altach	Netanya, Israel
19:00	Tibi (yellow card) 35'; Kjartansson 41'; Yeini 73'	Report	Schreiner (yellow card) 63'; Ngamaleu (yellow card) 70'; Netzer (yellow card) 79'; Aigner (yellow card) 81': Aigner 20'; Netzer 59'	Stadium: Netanya Stadium; Referee: Aleksei Eskov (Russia)

=== Group stage ===
Pos	Team	Pld	W	D	L	GF	GA	GD	Pts	Qualification	VIL	AST	SLP	MTA
1	(Spain) Villarreal	6	3	2	1	10	6	+4	11	Advance to knockout phase	—	3–1	2–2	0–1
2	(Kazakhstan) Astana	6	3	1	2	10	7	+3	10	Advance to knockout phase	2–3	—	1–1	4–0
3	(Czech Republic) Slavia Prague	6	2	2	2	6	6	0	8		0–2	0–1	—	1–0
4	(Israel) Maccabi Tel Aviv	6	1	1	4	1	8	−7	4		0–0	0–1	0–2	—

Source: UEFA

14 September 2017 Round 1	SK Slavia Prague (Czech Republic)	1-0	(Israel) Maccabi Tel Aviv	Prague, Czech Republic
19:00 CEST (UTC+02:00)	Necid 12'; Stoch (yellow card) 54'	Report	Babin (yellow card) 30'; Yeini (yellow card) 90+3'	Stadium: Eden Arena

14 September 2017 Round 2	Maccabi Tel Aviv (Israel)	0-0	(Spain) Villarreal CF	Netanya, Israel
19:00 CEST (UTC+02:00)	Blackman (yellow card) 15'; Itzhaki		Costa (yellow card) 58'	Stadium: Netanya Stadium

19 October 2017 3	Astana (Kazakhstan)	4-0	(Israel) Maccabi Tel Aviv	Astana, Kazakhstan
22:00 (UTC+6)	Muzhikov (yellow card) 13'; Twumasi 33' (pen.), 42'; Kabananga 47', 52'; Shitov (yellow card) 61'	Report	Peretz (yellow card) 33'; Blackman (yellow card) 41'	Stadium: Astana Arena

3 November 2017 4	Maccabi Tel Aviv (Israel)	0-1	(Kazakhstan) Astana	Netanya, Israel
20:05	Schoenfeld (yellow card) 66'	Report	Tagybergen (yellow card) 38'; Twumasi 57'	Stadium: Netanya Stadium

23 November 2017 Round 5	Maccabi Tel Aviv (Israel)	0-2	(Czech Republic) SK Slavia Prague	Netanya, Israel
22:05 IST (UTC+02:00)	Rikan (yellow card) 8'; Davidzada (yellow card) 38'; Kjartansson (yellow card) 39'; Peretz (yellow card) 72'	Report	Souček (yellow card) 42'; Hušbauer 45+2', 54'; Ven Buren (yellow card) 82'	Stadium: Netanya Stadium

7 December 2017 6	Villarreal (Spain)	0-1	(Israel) Maccabi Tel Aviv	Villarreal, Spain
19:00 CET (UTC+01:00)		Report	Peretz (yellow card) 33'; Blackman 60'	Stadium: La Cerámica

== Israeli Premier League ==
=== Regular season ===
20 August 2017 1	Maccabi Tel Aviv	0–3	Beitar Jerusalem	Netanya
21:00	Rajković (yellow card) 10'; Peretz (yellow card) 17'; Spungin (yellow card) 36'; Yitzhaki (yellow card) 45'		Shechter 10', 34'; Keltjens (yellow card) 30'; Heister (yellow card) 60'; Klaiman (yellow card) 69'; Vered 90'	Stadium: Netanya Stadium

26 August 2017 2	Ironi Kiryat Shmona	1-2	Maccabi Tel Aviv	Kiryat Shmona
20:15	Hasselbaink 61'; Brossou (yellow card) 72'		Atzili 20', 41'; Spungin (yellow card) 87'	Stadium: Kiryat Shmona Municipal Stadium

9 September 2017 3	Maccabi Tel Aviv	2-0	Bnei Sakhnin	Netanya
18:00	Kjartansson 54', 72'; Blackman (yellow card) 63'		Sagas (yellow card) 24'; Khalaila (yellow card) 54'; Ottman (yellow card) 55'; Mugrabi (yellow card) 64'	Stadium: Netanya Stadium

18 September 2017 4	Maccabi Netanya	2-3	Maccabi Tel Aviv	Netanya
21:00	Keita 20'; Saba 29'; Olsak (yellow card) 39'		Rodríguez (yellow card) 18'; Atzili 22' (yellow card) 52'; Davidzada (yellow card) 38'; Itzhaki (yellow card) 39'; Kjartansson 50'; Blackman 59'	Stadium: Netanya Stadium

24 September 2017 5	Maccabi Tel Aviv	0-0	Maccabi Haifa	Netanya
21:00	Ben Haim (red card) 44'		Dos Santos (yellow card) 34'; Lavi (yellow card) 58'; Ben Harush (red card) 80'	Stadium: Netanya Stadium

1 October 2017 6	Hapoel Ashkelon	2-2	Maccabi Tel Aviv	Ashkelon
21:00	Oremuš (yellow card) 56'; Raly 82' (yellow card) 90+2'; Smiljanić 84'; Ivančić (yellow card) 85'		Blackman 24'; Atzili 50' (pen.); Yeini (yellow card) 90+2'	Stadium: Sala Stadium

15 October 2017 7	Maccabi Tel Aviv	2-0	Bne Yehuda Tel Aviv	Netanya
20:15	Kjartansson 51'; Battocchio (yellow card) 67'; Ben Haim (yellow card) 76'; Blackman 90+5'		Habshi (yellow card) 26'; Kandil (yellow card) 32'	Stadium: Netanya Stadium

23 October 2017 8	Hapoel Be'er Sheva	2-1	Maccabi Tel Aviv	Be'er Sheva
21:00	Abd Elhamed (yellow card) 15' (red card) 21'; Taha (yellow card) 49'; Nwakaeme 62'; Sahar 68'; Korhut (yellow card) 74'; Elo (yellow card) 90'		Rikan (yellow card) 29'; Davidzada (yellow card) 61'; Azili 89'; Babin (yellow card) 90'; Ben Haim (yellow card) 90+1'; Atar (yellow card) 90+3'	Stadium: Turner Stadium

29 October 2017 9	Maccabi Tel Aviv	5-2	Hapoel Acre	Netanya
20:10	Atar 28', 76', 90+2'; Rikan 30', 69'; Ben Haim (yellow card) 53'		Eliyahu (yellow card) 33'; Knaykovski 80'; Mulić 86'; Farhat (yellow card) 90'	Stadium: Netanya Stadium

5 November 2017 10	Hapoel Ra'anana	0-1	Maccabi Tel Aviv	Netanya
20:30	Binyamin (yellow card) 30'; Shaker (yellow card) 39'; Nimni (yellow card) 40'; Tibi (yellow card) 40'		Dasa 10' (yellow card) 87'; Kjartansson (yellow card) 42'	Stadium: Netanya Stadium

26 November 2017 11	Hapoel Haifa	2-2	Maccabi Tel Aviv	Haifa
20:15	Turgeman 33'; Kapiloto (yellow card) 45' (red card) 86'; Maman (yellow card) 48' (goal) 55' (pen.)		Babin (yellow card) 13'; Rikan 35'; Atar 45'	Stadium: Sammy Ofer Stadium

2 December 2017 12	Maccabi Tel Aviv	1-1	F.C. Ashdod	Netanya
16:00	Micha (yellow card) 37'; Blackman 45'; Davidzada (yellow card) 67'; Atar (yellow card) 80'		Mauricio 30'; Kinda (yellow card) 67'; Asafa (yellow card) 79'; Moshel (yellow card) 79'; Edri (yellow card) 81' (red card) 90+2'	Stadium: Netanya Stadium

11 December 2017 13	Maccabi Petah Tikva	0-0	Maccabi Tel Aviv	Petah Tikva
21:00	Peser (yellow card) 60'		Babin (yellow card) 40'; Itzhaki (yellow card) 79'; Blackman (yellow card) 88'	Stadium: HaMoshava Stadium

18 December 2017 14	Beitar Jerusalem	1-2	Maccabi Tel Aviv	Jerusalem
21:00	Shechter (yellow card) 41'; Ferreira 55'; Sabo (yellow card) 90'		Rikan 1'; Golasa (yellow card) 11'; Blackman 42' (yellow card) 42'; Babin (yellow card) 54'; Peretz (yellow card) 72'	Stadium: Teddy Stadium

23 December 2017 15	Maccabi Tel Aviv	2-1	Ironi Kiryat Shmona	Netanya
20:30	Kjartansson 19' (yellow card) 30'; Blackman 54'; Dasa (yellow card) 79'; Micha (yellow card) 84'		Brossou (yellow card) 39' (red card) 65'; Ryan (yellow card) 42'; Abed 44'	Stadium: Netanya Stadium

1 January 2018 16	Bnei Sakhnin	0-1	Maccabi Tel Aviv	Sakhnin
21:00	Kandil (yellow card) 55'; Khalaila (yellow card) 75'; Sagas (yellow card) 90'		Peretz (yellow card) 39'; Kjartansson 56' (pen.); Rodríguez (yellow card) 71'; Blackman (yellow card) 89'	Stadium: Doha Stadium

9 January 2018 17	Maccabi Tel Aviv	3-0	Maccabi Netanya	Netanya
21:00	Babin (yellow card) 20'; Micha (yellow card) 29'; Peretz (yellow card) 38'; Dasa (yellow card) 73'; Itzhaki 75'; Kjartansson 82', 90'; Blackman (yellow card) 87'		Mor (red card) 11'; Goldenberg (yellow card) 12'; Kougbenya (yellow card) 62'	Stadium: Netanya Stadium

15 January 2018 18	Maccabi Haifa	1-3	Maccabi Tel Aviv	Haifa
21:00	Levi (yellow card) 19'; Rukavytsya 66'; Gershon (yellow card) 68'; Allyson (yellow card) 74'		Kjartansson 1', 54'; Tibi (yellow card) 66'; Battocchio 85'	Stadium: Sammy Ofer Stadium

21 January 2018 19	Maccabi Tel Aviv	3-1	Hapoel Ashkelon	Netanya
20:30	Davidzada 14'; Ben Haim (yellow card) 54'; Peretz (yellow card) 64'; Itzhaki 65' (yellow card) 67'; Atar 87' (pen.)		Gabay 7'; R. haddad (yellow card) 86'	Stadium: Netanya Stadium

28 January 2018 20	Bnei Yehuda Tel Aviv	0-0	Maccabi Tel Aviv	Petah Tikva
20:30	Zubas (yellow card) 53'; Mori (yellow card) 84'		Rikan (yellow card) 58'; Micha (yellow card) 90+2'	Stadium: HaMoshava Stadium

5 February 2018 21	Maccabi Tel Aviv	1-0	Hapoel Be'er Sheva	Netanya
21:00	Spungin (yellow card) 22' (red card) 40'; Atar 48'		Bitton (yellow card) 19'; Ogu (yellow card) 22' (red card) 25'; Taha (yellow card) 49' (red card) 89'	Stadium: Netanya Stadium

11 February 2018 22	Hapoel Acre	0-2	Maccabi Tel Aviv	Acre
20:15	Ibeh (yellow card) 33'; Reichert (yellow card) 72'; Shish (yellow card) 79'		Peretz (yellow card) 17'; Blackman (yellow card) 32' (goal) 79'; Itzhaki (red card) 57'; Atar 72'	Stadium: Acre Municipal Stadium

17 February 2018 23	Maccabi Tel Aviv	0-1	Hapoel Ra'anana	Netanya
16:00	Dasa (yellow card) 73'; Babin (yellow card) 90'; Tibi (yellow card) 90+1'		Zikri 28'; Nikolić (yellow card) 41'; Camara (yellow card) 71'	Stadium: Netanya Stadium

24 February 2018 24	Maccabi Tel Aviv	4-0	Hapoel Haifa	Netanya
20:30	Blackman 13'; Rodríguez 33', 61'; Rikan (yellow card) 66'; Davidzada 83'		Arel (yellow card) 57'; Ben Basat (yellow card) 75'	Stadium: Netanya Stadium

3 March 2018 25	F.C. Ashdod	0-0	Maccabi Tel Aviv	Ashdod
20:30	Inbrum (yellow card) 23'; Brown (yellow card) 82'		Babin (yellow card) 81'	Stadium: Yud-Alef Stadium

12 March 2018 26	Maccabi Tel Aviv	2-0	Maccabi Petah Tikva	Netanya
21:00	Kjartansson 17'; Rikan 45+1' (yellow card) 62'; Rodríguez (yellow card) 74'; Kanyuk (yellow card) 76'		Soumah (yellow card) 50'	Stadium: Netanya Stadium

==== Regular season table ====
Pos	Team	Pld	W	D	L	GF	GA	GD	Pts	Qualification or relegation
1	Hapoel Be'er Sheva	26	17	6	3	43	18	+25	57	Qualification for the Championship round
2	Beitar Jerusalem	26	17	5	4	60	30	+30	56	Qualification for the Championship round
3	Maccabi Tel Aviv	26	16	7	3	44	20	+24	55	Qualification for the Championship round
4	Hapoel Haifa	26	15	7	4	36	21	+15	52	Qualification for the Championship round
5	Maccabi Netanya	26	12	9	5	43	29	+14	45	Qualification for the Championship round

Source: Israel Football Association, Soccerway
Rules for classification: 1) Points; 2) Goal difference; 3) Matches won; 4) Goals scored; 5) Head-to-head points; 6) Head-to-head goal difference; 7) Head-to-head goals scored; 8) Play-off.

=== Play-off ===
18 March 2018 27	Maccabi Tel Aviv	1-2	Hapoel Haifa	Netanya
21:00	Dasa 15'; Golasa (yellow card) 18'; Blackman (yellow card) 45'; Spugnin (yellow card) 52'		Mitrevski (yellow card) 19'; Barsky (yellow card) 49'; Plakuschenko 67' (yellow card) 90'; Megrelashvili 90+2'	Stadium: Netanya Stadium

3 April 2018 28	Maccabi Netanya	4-1	Maccabi Tel Aviv	Netanya
19:30	Saba 17', 57', 90+3'; Avraham (yellow card) 33'; Safouri 45'; Glazer (yellow card) 47'; Levy (yellow card) 52'; Tiram (yellow card) 78'		Peretz (yellow card) 5'; Micha (yellow card) 66'; Ithzkai (yellow card) 69' (goal) 80' (pen.)	Stadium: Netanya Stadium

9 April 2018 29	Maccabi Tel Aviv	0-1	Hapoel Be'er Sheva	Netanya
21:00	Babin (yellow card) 50'; Ben Haim (yellow card) 84'; Golasa (yellow card) 85'; Itzhaki (yellow card) 90+5'		Maman 35'; Bitton (yellow card) 36' (red card) 53'; Haimov (yellow card) 83'; Einbinder (yellow card) 90+5'	Stadium: Netanya Stadium

16 April 2018 30	Beitar Jerusalem	3-2	Maccabi Tel Aviv	Jerusalem
	Claudemir 29'; Ezra 34'; Goldberg (yellow card) 40'; Sylvestr 42'; Klaiman (yellow card) 80'		Dasa (yellow card) 27'; Atzili 38' (pen.); Kjartansson 58'	Stadium: Teddy Stadium

21 April 2018 31	Maccabi Tel Aviv	2-0	Bnei Yehuda Tel Aviv	Netanya
20:30	Rodríguez (yellow card) 10'; Schoenfeld (yellow card) 44'; Davidzada (yellow card) 55'; Atzili 62'; Micha 72'		Soro (yellow card) 60'; Gordana (red card) 68'	Stadium: Netanya Stadium

30 April 2018 32	Hapoel Haifa	2-2	Maccabi Tel Aviv	Haifa
21:00	Tamaș (yellow card) 46'; Ben Basat 88', 90+3'		Schoenfeld (yellow card) 31' (red card) 89'; Atzili 47'; Rikan (yellow card) 76'; Blackman 81'	Stadium: Sammy Ofer Stadium

5 May 2018 33	Maccabi Tel Aviv	2-0	Maccabi Netanya	Netanya
20:30	Ben Haim (yellow card) 5'; Spungin (yellow card) 21'; Kjartansson 69' (pen.); Rikan (yellow card) 74'; Peretz (yellow card) 78'; Atzili 89'		Heubach (yellow card) 31'; Safouri (yellow card) 50'; Glazer (yellow card) 79'	Stadium: Netanya Stadium

12 May 2018 34	Hapoel Be'er Sheva	0-1	Maccabi Tel Aviv	Be'er Sheva
21:00	Taha (yellow card) 33'; Maman (yellow card) 45'; Einbinder (yellow card) 55'; Haimov (yellow card) 90'		Peretz 44'; Blackman (yellow card) 86'	Stadium: Turner Stadium

15 May 2018 35	Maccabi Tel Aviv	3-1	Beitar Jerusalem	Netanya
21:00	Rikan 7'; Davidzada 31'; Blackman 37' (pen.)		Kachila 63'	Stadium: Netanya Stadium

21 May 2018 36	Bnei Yehuda Tel Aviv	0-2	Maccabi Tel Aviv	Petah Tikva
21:00	Tchibota (yellow card) 41'		Atzili 27' (pen.); Kanyuk 79'	Stadium: HaMoshava Stadium

==== Championship round table ====
Pos	Team	Pld	W	D	L	GF	GA	GD	Pts	Qualification
1	Hapoel Be'er Sheva (C)	36	24	8	4	70	27	+43	80	Qualification for the Champions League first qualifying round
2	Maccabi Tel Aviv	36	21	8	7	60	33	+27	71	Qualification for the Europa League first qualifying round
3	Beitar Jerusalem	36	20	8	8	75	51	+24	68	Qualification for the Europa League first qualifying round
4	Hapoel Haifa	36	17	11	8	48	39	+9	62	Qualification for the Europa League second qualifying round (Note: Hapoel Haifa qualified for the Europa League second qualifying round by winning the 2017–18 Israel State Cup.)
5	Maccabi Netanya	36	16	10	10	59	54	+5	58	
6	Bnei Yehuda Tel Aviv	36	13	10	13	47	41	+6	49	

Source: Israel Football Association, Soccerway
Rules for classification: 1) Points; 2) Goal difference; 3) Matches won; 4) Goals scored; 5) Head-to-head points; 6) Head-to-head goal difference; 7) Head-to-head goals scored; 8) Play-off.
(C) Champions

== State Cup ==
6 January 2018 Eight round	Maccabi Tel Aviv	3-0	Bnei M.M.B.E. HaGolan VeHaGalil	Netanya
18:10	Ben Haim (yellow card) 5'; Itzhaki 70'; Schoenfeld 84'; Davidzada 85'		Abu Salah (yellow card) 69'	Stadium: Netanya Stadium

24 January 2018 round of 16	Maccabi Haifa	3-0	Maccabi Tel Aviv	Haifa
18:10	Kehat 54'; Sallalich 57'; Rukavytsya 76'		Dor Peretz (yellow card) 76'; Golasa (yellow card) 88'	Stadium: Sammy Ofer Stadium

== Toto Cup ==
=== Group stage ===
Pos	Team	Pld	W	D	L	GF	GA	GD	Pts	Qualification or relegation
1	Maccabi Tel Aviv	4	3	1	0	7	1	+6	10	Qualified to Quarter-finals
2	Bnei Yehuda	4	2	0	2	4	5	−1	6	Qualified to Quarter-finals
3	Maccabi Petah Tikva	4	2	0	2	4	6	−2	6	Qualified to Quarter-finals
4	Maccabi Netanya	4	1	1	2	7	8	−1	4	
5	Hapoel Ra'anana	4	1	0	3	5	7	−2	3	

Updated to match(es) played on 27 September 2017. Source: Israel Football Association
Rules for classification: 1) points; 2) goal difference; 3) number of wins; 4) goals scored; 5) head to head; 6)deciding match.

30 July 2017 1	Maccabi Tel Aviv	2–0	Bnei Yehuda Tel Aviv	Netanya
21:00	Rikan (yellow card) 35'; Yehezkel 44'; Itzhaki (yellow card) 45'; Filipenko (yellow card) 65'; Baltaxa (yellow card) 67'		Konstantini (yellow card) 20'; Feshler	Stadium: Netanya Stadium

6 August 2017 2	Maccabi Tel Aviv	0–0	Maccabi Netanya	Netanya
19:00	Azulay (yellow card) 57'; Micha (yellow card) 81'			Stadium: Netanya Stadium

9 August 2017 3	Maccabi Tel Aviv	3–0	Maccabi Petah Tikva	Netanya
21:00	Kjartansson 9', 17', 56'; Golasa (yellow card) 27'		Soumah (yellow card) 16'; Shabtay (yellow card) 19'	Stadium: Netanya Stadium

12 August 2017 4	Maccabi Tel Aviv	2–1	Hapoel Ra'anana	Netanya
21:00	Ben Haim 45'; Azulay (yellow card) 45' (goal) 55'; Kartzav (yellow card) 90'		Abuhatzira (yellow card) 3'; Shaker (red card) 11'; Hugi 83'; Mbola (yellow card) 86'	Stadium: Netanya Stadium

=== Quarterfinal ===
26 October 2017	Maccabi Tel Aviv	3–0	Bnei Yehuda Tel Aviv	Netanya
19:00	Blackman (yellow card) 18' (goal) 77' (pen.); Atar 42'; Sušić (red card) 44'; Spugnin (yellow card) 71'; Rikan 78'		Habshi (yellow card) 24'; Mori (yellow card) 41'; Balilty (red card) 66'; Hozez (yellow card) 76'	Stadium: Netanya Stadium

=== Semifinal ===
30 November 2017	Maccabi Tel Aviv	2-0	Ironi Kiryat Shmona	Acre
20:30	Schoenfeld 17'; Yitzhaki 53'			Stadium: Acre Municipal Stadium

=== Final ===
14 December 2017	Maccabi Tel Aviv	1-0	Hapoel Be'er Sheva	Netanya
20:40	Davidzada (yellow card) 10'; Rikan (yellow card) 32'; Tibi (yellow card) 51'; Kjartansson 83'		Taha (yellow card) 32'	Stadium: Netanya Stadium

== Squad statistics ==
As of match played 15 May 2018

=== Appearances and goals ===
No.	Pos	Nat	Player	Total		Premier League		State Cup		Toto Cup		UEFA Europa League	
No.	Pos	Nat	Player	Apps	Goals	Apps	Goals	Apps	Goals	Apps	Goals	Apps	Goals
1	GK	(Israel) ISR	Daniel Lifshitz	0	0	0	0	0	0	0	0	0	0
2	DF	(Israel) ISR	Eli Dasa	24	2	18	1	1	0	1	0	4	1
3	DF	(Israel) ISR	Yuval Spungin	34	0	20	0	1	0	4	0	9	0
5	DF	(France) FRA	Jean-Sylvain Babin	40	0	32	0	1	0	2	0	5	0
6	MF	(Spain) ESP	José Rodríguez	22	2	19	2	1	0	2	0	0	0
7	FW	(Israel) ISR	Omer Atzili	31	12	17	10	0	0	3	0	11	2
9	FW	(Iceland) ISL	Viðar Örn Kjartansson	46	21	30	13	1	0	3	4	12	4
10	FW	(Israel) ISR	Barak Itzhaki	25	6	14	3	2	1	4	1	5	1
11	FW	(Israel) ISR	Nick Blackman	40	12	31	10	1	0	3	1	5	1
13	DF	(Israel) ISR	Sheran Yeini	38	1	21	0	1	0	3	0	13	1
15	MF	(Israel) ISR	Dor Micha	42	1	28	1	2	0	5	0	7	0
16	FW	(Israel) ISR	Eliran Atar	36	8	25	7	2	0	3	1	6	0
17	MF	(Israel) ISR	Gidi Kanyuk	5	1	5	1	0	0	0	0	0	0
18	DF	(Israel) ISR	Eitan Tibi	42	0	25	0	1	0	4	0	12	0
19	GK	(Brazil) BRA	Daniel	3	0	0	0	1	0	2	0	0	0
22	DF	(Israel) ISR	Avi Rikan	53	9	34	6	1	0	6	2	12	1
23	MF	(Israel) ISR	Eyal Golasa	33	0	20	0	2	0	3	0	8	0
25	FW	(Israel) ISR	Aaron Schoenfeld	35	4	19	0	1	1	4	1	11	2
26	DF	(Israel) ISR	Tal Ben Haim	35	1	19	0	1	0	3	1	12	0
27	DF	(Israel) ISR	Ofir Davidzada	51	4	31	3	2	1	4	0	14	0
28	MF	(Italy) ITA	Cristian Battocchio	41	1	25	1	0	0	5	0	11	0
42	MF	(Israel) ISR	Dor Peretz	41	2	24	1	1	0	7	0	9	1
55	GK	(Israel) ISR	Haviv Ohayon	0	0	0	0	0	0	0	0	0	0
95	GK	(Serbia) SRB	Predrag Rajković	55	0	36	0	1	0	4	0	14	0
Players away from Maccabi Tel Aviv on loan:
24	MF	(Israel) ISR	Yonatan Cohen	6	1	0	0	0	0	3	0	3	1
17	MF	(Israel) ISR	Sagiv Yehezkel	5	1	1	0	0	0	4	1	0	0
45	MF	(Israel) ISR	Eliel Peretz	5	0	0	0	0	0	3	0	2	0
29	MF	(Brazil) BRA	Marcelo	4	0	0	0	0	0	4	0	0	0
21	DF	(Belarus) BLR	Egor Filipenko	8	0	0	0	1	0	4	0	3	0
44	DF	(Israel) ISR	Sean Goldberg	4	0	0	0	0	0	4	0	0	0
20	DF	(Israel) ISR	Matan Baltaxa	4	0	0	0	0	0	4	0	0	0
45	MF	(Israel) ISR	Or Dasa	6	1	3	1	1	0	1	0	1	0
Players who appeared for Maccabi Tel Aviv that left during the season:
16	MF	(Israel) ISR	Shlomi Azulay	5	1	0	0	0	0	3	1	2	0
31	MF	(Bosnia and Herzegovina) BIH	Tino-Sven Sušić	11	0	4	0	0	0	3	0	4	0
