= José Rodríguez (footballer, born 1994) =

Spanish footballer

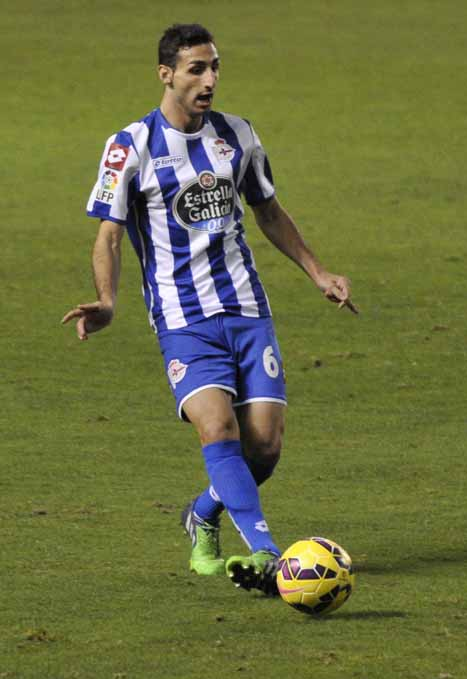
- Rodríguez playing for Deportivo in 2014

Personal information
- Full name: José Rodríguez Martínez
- Date of birth: 16 December 1994 (age 31)
- Place of birth: Villajoyosa, Spain
- Height: 1.81 m (5 ft 11 in)
- Position: Central midfielder

Team information
- Current team: Flamurtari
- Number: 10

Youth career
- 2002–2007: Villajoyosa
- 2007–2009: Hércules
- 2009–2012: Real Madrid

Senior career*
| Years | Team | Apps | (Gls) |
| 2012–2014 | Real Madrid B | 61 | (4) |
| 2012–2015 | Real Madrid | 1 | (0) |
| 2014–2015 | → Deportivo La Coruña (loan) | 25 | (2) |
| 2015–2016 | Galatasaray | 14 | (0) |
| 2016–2019 | Mainz 05 | 2 | (0) |
| 2017 | → Málaga (loan) | 6 | (0) |
| 2017–2018 | → Maccabi Tel Aviv (loan) | 19 | (2) |
| 2018–2019 | → Fortuna Sittard (loan) | 24 | (2) |
| 2019–2020 | Málaga | 0 | (0) |
| 2020 | → Fuenlabrada (loan) | 14 | (1) |
| 2020–2022 | Maccabi Haifa | 56 | (1) |
| 2022–2023 | Union SG | 9 | (0) |
| 2023–2024 | Hapoel Tel Aviv | 12 | (0) |
| 2024 | Adana Demirspor | 7 | (0) |
| 2025– | Flamurtari | 5 | (0) |

International career
| 2010 | Spain U17 | 5 | (1) |
| 2013 | Spain U19 | 8 | (1) |
| 2013 | Spain U20 | 1 | (0) |
| 2015 | Spain U21 | 6 | (0) |
- * Club domestic league appearances and goals as of 22:26, 25 November 2025 (UTC)

José Rodríguez Martínez (born 16 December 1994) is a Spanish professional footballer who plays as a central midfielder for Kategoria Superiore club Flamurtari.

He began his career at Real Madrid, where he played mostly in the reserves, and was loaned to Deportivo before being sold to Galatasaray. He subsequently represented Mainz 05 (where he had loan spells with Málaga, Maccabi Tel Aviv and Fortuna Sittard), and Málaga (also being loaned to Fuenlabrada). He joined Maccabi Haifa in 2020.

Rodríguez represented Spain up to under-21 level.

== Club career ==
=== Real Madrid ===
Born in Villajoyosa, Alicante, Valencian Community of Romani descent, Rodríguez played for three clubs as a youth, finishing his youth career with Real Madrid who he joined at the age of 14. He made his senior debut three years later, with Real Madrid Castilla in the Segunda División.

On 30 October 2012, Rodríguez was called up to the first team for the first time, as manager José Mourinho picked him for a match against CD Alcoyano in that season's Copa del Rey; he came on as a substitute at half-time, and scored the third goal in a 4–1 away win.

Rodríguez made his La Liga debut on 1 December 2012, playing the last minute of a 2–0 victory over Atlético Madrid. Three days later, he became the youngest player ever to appear for Real Madrid in the UEFA Champions League match at 17 years and 354 days, when he replaced Kaká in the 4–1 group stage defeat of AFC Ajax.

In 2013–14, Rodríguez made 37 appearances and scored four times as Castilla were relegated to Segunda División B. He was booked 14 times during the campaign, being sent off on 15 February 2014 in a 3–1 win over FC Barcelona B at the Alfredo di Stéfano Stadium.

On 22 July 2014, Rodríguez joined Deportivo de La Coruña in a season-long loan deal. He played 27 competitive games, with his side narrowly avoiding relegation; his first top-flight goals came in 2–2 draws against Rayo Vallecano and Granada CF, both at home.

=== Galatasaray ===
Rodríguez signed for Galatasaray SK in the summer of 2015, after agreeing to a four-year contract. Unused in the Süper Lig opener at Sivasspor on 15 August, he made his debut nine days later by starting in a 1–2 loss to Osmanlıspor at the Türk Telekom Arena.

=== Mainz ===
On 29 June 2016, Rodríguez moved to 1. FSV Mainz 05 on a four-year deal. He was sent off a mere five minutes into his German Bundesliga debut, after a dangerous challenge on FC Augsburg's Dominik Kohr in an eventual 1–3 home defeat.

On the very last day of the 2017 January transfer window, Rodríguez was loaned to Málaga CF until June. He was again ejected in his second appearance, being booked twice in an eventual 2–1 home win against UD Las Palmas.

Rodríguez left on loan for a third time in August 2018, joining Eredivisie club Fortuna Sittard.

=== Málaga return ===
On 18 August 2019, Rodríguez returned to Málaga after agreeing to a three-year contract. However, due to the club's financial problems, he was not registered for the first half of the campaign, and was subsequently loaned to fellow second-tier CF Fuenlabrada the following 30 January.

=== Maccabi Haifa ===
Rodríguez returned to the Israeli Premier League on 10 September 2020, after he signed with Maccabi Haifa F.C. on a yearly salary of €270,000. On 1 March 2021, his cousin died in Spain aged 29 from COVID-19 complications, and it was decided that the team's players would wear black armbands in the next match in her memory. He scored the winning goal two days later, a powerful long-range volley in a 2–1 victory over Hapoel Tel Aviv FC, which earned him praise from Israeli pundits as well as Spanish media.

=== Union Saint-Gilloise ===
Rodriguez joined Belgian Pro League side Royale Union Saint-Gilloise in summer 2022. On 15 February 2023, he terminated his two-year contract by mutual consent.

== International career ==
Rodríguez captained Spain at the 2013 UEFA European Under-19 Championship in Lithuania. In the semi-final against France, he scored a penalty kick to open a 2–1 defeat after extra time.

== Career statistics ==
As of 31 December 2023

Appearances and goals by club, season and competition
| Club | Season | League | | | Cup | | Continental | | Other | | Total | |
| Club | Season | Division | Apps | Goals | Apps | Goals | Apps | Goals | Apps | Goals | Apps | Goals |
|---|---|---|---|---|---|---|---|---|---|---|---|---|
| Real Madrid B | 2012–13 | Segunda División | 24 | 0 | — | | — | | — | | 24 | 0 |
| Real Madrid B | 2013–14 | Segunda División | 37 | 4 | — | | — | | — | | 37 | 4 |
| Real Madrid B | Total | | 61 | 4 | — | | — | | — | | 61 | 4 |
| Real Madrid | 2012–13 | La Liga | 1 | 0 | 2 | 1 | 1 (Note: Appearances in UEFA Champions League) | 0 | — | | 4 | 1 |
| Real Madrid | 2013–14 | La Liga | 0 | 0 | 0 | 0 | 0 | 0 | — | | 0 | 0 |
| Real Madrid | Total | | 1 | 0 | 2 | 1 | 1 | 0 | — | | 4 | 1 |
| Deportivo (loan) | 2014–15 | La Liga | 25 | 2 | 2 | 0 | — | | — | | 27 | 2 |
| Galatasaray | 2015–16 | Süper Lig | 14 | 0 | 6 | 0 | 3 | 0 | 0 | 0 | 23 | 0 |
| Mainz 05 | 2016–17 | Bundesliga | 2 | 0 | 2 | 0 | 1 (Note: Appearances in UEFA Europa League) | 0 | — | | 5 | 0 |
| Málaga (loan) | 2016–17 | La Liga | 6 | 0 | 0 | 0 | — | | — | | 6 | 0 |
| Maccabi Tel Aviv (loan) | 2017–18 | Israeli Premier League | 19 | 2 | 1 | 0 | — | | 2 (Note: Appearances in Toto Cup) | 0 | 22 | 2 |
| Fortuna Sittard (loan) | 2018–19 | Eredivisie | 24 | 2 | 4 | 0 | — | | — | | 28 | 2 |
| Fuenlabrada | 2019–20 | Segunda División | 14 | 1 | 0 | 0 | — | | — | | 14 | 1 |
| Maccabi Haifa | 2020–21 | Israeli Premier League | 29 | 1 | 4 | 0 | 3 | 0 | — | | 36 | 1 |
| Maccabi Haifa | 2021–22 | Israeli Premier League | 27 | 0 | 5 | 0 | 6 (Note: Two appearances in UEFA Champions League, four appearances in UEFA Europa Conference League) | 0 | 2 (Note: One appearance in Israeli Super Cup, one appearance in Toto Cup) | 0 | 40 | 0 |
| Maccabi Haifa | Total | | 56 | 1 | 9 | 0 | 9 | 0 | 2 | 0 | 76 | 1 |
| Union Saint-Gilloise | 2022–23 | Belgian Pro League | 9 | 0 | 1 | 0 | 3 | 0 | — | | 13 | 0 |
| Hapoel Tel Aviv | 2023–24 | Israeli Premier League | 12 | 0 | 0 | 0 | — | | 3 | 0 | 15 | 0 |
| Career total | | | 243 | 12 | 27 | 1 | 17 | 0 | 7 | 0 | 294 | 13 |

== Honours ==
Galatasaray

- Turkish Cup: 2015–16

Maccabi Tel Aviv

- Toto Cup: 2017–18

Maccabi Haifa

- Israeli Premier League: 2020–21, 2021–22
- Toto Cup: 2021–22
- Israel Super Cup: 2021
