= Eliran Atar =

Israeli professional footballer

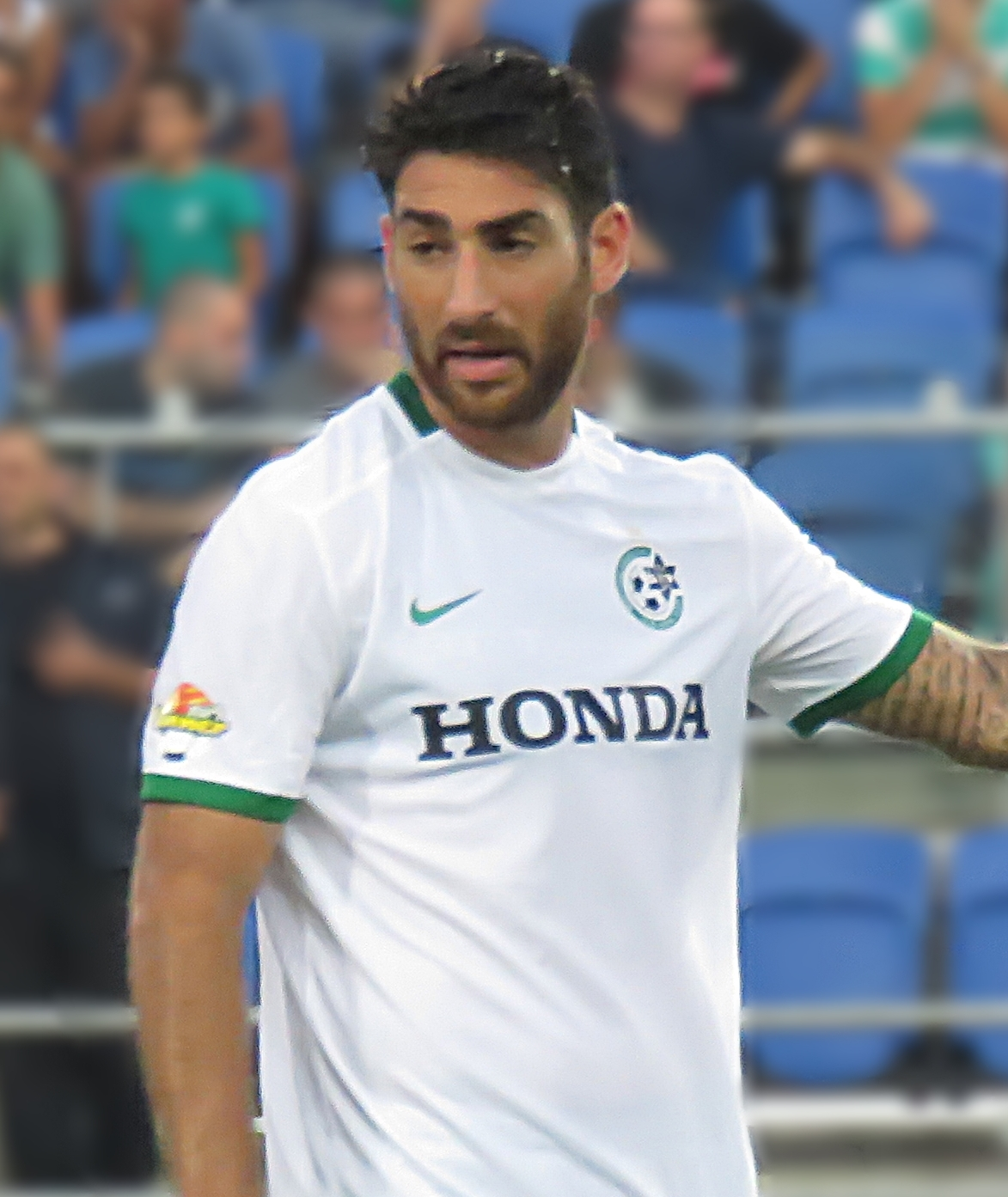
- Atar playing for Maccabi Haifa in 2015

Personal information
- Full name: Eliran Atar
- Date of birth: 17 February 1987 (age 39)
- Place of birth: Tel Aviv, Israel
- Height: 1.79 m (5 ft 10 in)
- Position: Forward

Team information
- Current team: Bnei Yehuda
- Number: 16

Youth career
- Bnei Yehuda

Senior career*
Years	Team	Apps	(Gls)
2005–2010	Bnei Yehuda	112	(26)
2010–2013	Maccabi Tel Aviv	96	(53)
2013–2015	Stade de Reims	23	(2)
2015–2017	Maccabi Haifa	65	(23)
2017–2020	Maccabi Tel Aviv	60	(20)
2020–2021	Beitar Jerusalem	34	(15)
2021–	Bnei Yehuda	103	(29)

International career^{‡}
2005–2006	Israel U-19	8	(3)
2012–2018	Israel	7	(1)
- * Club domestic league appearances and goals as of 15 June 2025 ‡ National team caps and goals as of 12 July 2020

Eliran Atar (Hebrew: אלירן עטר; born 17 February 1987) is an Israeli professional footballer who plays for Bnei Yehuda as a forward.

== Early life ==
Atar was born in Tel Aviv, Israel.

== Club career ==
=== Bnei Yehuda ===
On 7 February 2009, when playing for Bnei Yehuda, Atar scored from an overhead kick that was a candidate for the 2009 Puskás Award, though finishing fourth (i.e., the fourth most beautiful goal of that year). He became the top scorer of the 2008–09 Israeli Premier League season with 14 goals.

=== Maccabi Tel Aviv ===
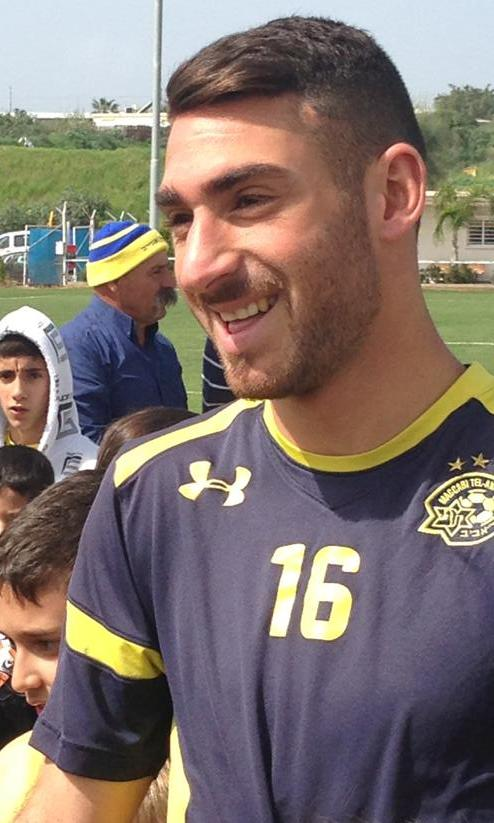
Atar training with Maccabi Tel-Aviv in 2012

On 7 May 2010, Atar signed a four-years contract with Maccabi Tel Aviv for a transfer fee of $1.2 million.

On 26 August 2010 he was selected to the Player Of The Match with two amazing goals on the win 4–3 over PSG in the Europa League. Atar completed his first season with Maccabi as the club's top goalscorer with 18 league goals and 22 overall (all competitions) season goals. He attracts interest from VfL Wolfsburg, 1. FC Nürnberg, Parma and Betis.

=== Reims ===
On 24 June Atar, signed a four-year deal with Ligue 1 side Stade de Reims.

=== Maccabi Haifa ===
On 15 January 2015, he signed a three half-year deal with Israeli Premier League side Maccabi Haifa.

== International career ==
On 28 August 2010 Atar received his first call up for the Israel national team for UEFA Euro 2012 qualifiers against Malta and Georgia but withdrew himself from the squad due to an eye injury received in a league match against Beitar Jerusalem. In October 2012, Atar was called up again to the Israeli squad before a double header 2014 FIFA World Cup qualifier against Luxembourg but yet again was released from the squad due to a lower back injury without making a national appearance. Atar, however, was able to make his debut in an international friendly defeat against Belarus, on 14 November 2012. On 12 November 2016, almost exactly four years later, Atar scored his first ever international goal for Israel in a 2018 FIFA World Cup Qualification match against Albania. It was only his fourth cap since 2012 and Israel won, 3–0.

== Career statistics ==
=== Club ===
As of 1 June 2021

Appearances and goals by club, season and competition
Club	Season	League			National Cup		League Cup		Europe		Other		Total	
Club	Season	Division	Apps	Goals	Apps	Goals	Apps	Goals	Apps	Goals	Apps	Goals	Apps	Goals
Bnei Yehuda	2003–04	Israeli Premier League	6	0	–		–		–		–		6	0
Bnei Yehuda	2004–05	Israeli Premier League	9	0	4	1	0	0	–		–		13	1
Bnei Yehuda	2005–06	Israeli Premier League	6	0	7	0	0	0	–		–		13	0
Bnei Yehuda	2006–07	Israeli Premier League	11	0	6	1	0	0	–		–		17	1
Bnei Yehuda	2007–08	Israeli Premier League	20	4	5	1	0	0	–		–		25	5
Bnei Yehuda	2008–09	Israeli Premier League	27	14	2	0	0	0	–		–		29	14
Bnei Yehuda	2009–10	Israeli Premier League	33	8	5	1	0	0	7 (Note: Appearance(s) in UEFA Europa League)	4	–		45	13
Bnei Yehuda	Total		112	26	29	4	0	0	7	4	–		148	34
Maccabi Tel Aviv	2010–11	Israeli Premier League	33	18	2	1	0	0	2	2	–		37	21
Maccabi Tel Aviv	2011–12	Israeli Premier League	31	13	1	0	0	0	10	6	–		42	19
Maccabi Tel Aviv	2012–13	Israeli Premier League	31	22	1	1	3	2	0	0	–		35	25
Maccabi Tel Aviv	Total		95	53	4	2	3	2	12	8	–		114	65
Reims	2013–14	Ligue 1	22	2	1	0	1	0	–		–		24	2
Reims	2014–15	Ligue 1	1	0	0	0	0	0	–		–		1	0
Reims	Total		23	2	1	0	1	0	–		–		25	2
Maccabi Haifa	2014–15	Israeli Premier League	14	6	0	0	0	0	–		–		14	6
Maccabi Haifa	2015–16	Israeli Premier League	27	10	3	2	0	0	–		–		30	12
Maccabi Haifa	2016–17	Israeli Premier League	24	7	1	0	0	0	–		–		25	7
Maccabi Haifa	2017–18	Israeli Premier League	0	0	0	0	2	2	–		–		2	2
Maccabi Haifa	Total		65	23	4	2	2	2	–		–		71	27
Maccabi Tel Aviv	2017–18	Israeli Premier League	25	7	2	0	3	1	6	0	–		36	8
Maccabi Tel Aviv	2018–19	Israeli Premier League	30	12	3	2	2	1	7	5	–		42	20
Maccabi Tel Aviv	2019–20	Israeli Premier League	5	1	1	0	2	0	3 (Note: Two appearances in UEFA Champions League, one appearance in UEFA Europa League)	0	1 (Note: Appearance in Israel Super Cup)	0	12	1
Maccabi Tel Aviv	Total		60	20	6	2	7	2	16	5	1	0	90	29
Beitar Jerusalem	2019–20	Israeli Premier League	5	4	1	0	0	0	0	0	–		6	4
Beitar Jerusalem	2020–21	Israeli Premier League	29	11	1	0	3	0	1	0	–		34	11
Beitar Jerusalem	Total		34	15	2	0	3	0	1	0	–		40	15
Bnei Yehuda	2021–22	Liga Leumit	29	11	5	0	0	0	–		–		34	11
Career total			418	150	51	10	16	6	36	17	1	0	521	183

=== International ===
As of match played 12 November 2016
Scores and results list Israel's goal tally first, score column indicates score after each Atar goal.

List of international goals scored by Eliran Atar
No.	Date	Venue	Cap	Opponent	Score	Result	Competition
1	12 November 2016	Elbasan Arena, Elbasan, Albania	4	Albania	3–0	3–0	2018 FIFA World Cup qualification

== Honours ==
=== Club ===
Maccabi Tel Aviv

- Israeli Premier League: 2012–13, 2018–19
- Toto Cup : 2017–18, 2018–19

Maccabi Haifa

- Israel State Cup: 2015–16

=== Individual ===
- FIFA Puskas Award 4th place: 2009
- Israeli Premier League – 2008–09 Top Goalscorer 1st place (Joint)
- Israeli Premier League – 2010–11 Top Goalscorer 2nd place
- Israeli Premier League – 2012–13 Top Goalscorer 1st place
- Footballer of the Year in Israel: 2012–13
