= 2017–18 Toto Cup Al =

Tournament details
- Country: Israel
- Teams: 14

Final positions
- Champions: Maccabi Tel Aviv
- Runners-up: Hapoel Be'er Sheva

Tournament statistics
- Matches played: 33
- Goals scored: 85 (2.58 per match)
- Top goal scorer(s): Kjartansson (4); El Krenawy

The 2017–18 Toto Cup Al was the 33rd season of the third-important football tournament in Israel since its introduction and the 12th tournament involving Israeli Premier League clubs only.

The competition is held in two stages. First, fourteen Premier League teams were divided into three groups, five teams in groups A and B and four teams in group C, the teams playing against each other once. The best three teams from groups A and B and the best two teams from group C will advance to the quarter-finals, which will be played over two-legged ties. The semi-finals and the final are then played as one-legged matches in a neutral venue.

Hapoel Be'er Sheva was the defending champion.

In the final, held on 14 December 2017, Maccabi Tel Aviv had beaten Hapoel Be'er Sheva 1–0.

== Group stage ==
Groups were allocated according to geographic distribution of the clubs, with the northern clubs allocated to Group A, In Group B allocated the two teams from Tel Aviv, one team from Petah Tikva, one from Netanya and one more team from Ra'anana. The southern clubs allocated to Group C (including Beitar Jerusalem).

The matches started July 29.

Key to colours in group tables
Teams advanced to the Quarterfinals

=== Group A ===
Pos	Team	Pld	W	D	L	GF	GA	GD	Pts	Qualification or relegation	MHA	HAC	IKS	HHA	BNS
1	Maccabi Haifa	4	2	2	0	10	4	+6	8	Qualified to Quarter-finals	—	2–2	0–0		
2	Hapoel Acre	4	2	1	1	5	7	−2	7	Qualified to Quarter-finals		—	0–4		2–1
3	Hapoel Kiryat Shmona	4	1	2	1	5	2	+3	5	Qualified to Quarter-finals			—	0–1	1–1
4	Hapoel Haifa	4	1	1	2	3	6	−3	4		1–4	0–1		—	
5	Bnei Sakhnin	4	0	2	2	4	8	−4	2		1–4			1–1	—

Updated to match(es) played on 13 August 2017. Source: Israel Football Association
Rules for classification: 1) points; 2) goal difference; 3) number of wins; 4) goals scored; 5) head to head; 6)deciding match.

=== Group B ===
Pos	Team	Pld	W	D	L	GF	GA	GD	Pts	Qualification or relegation	MTA	BNY	MPT	MCN	HRA
1	Maccabi Tel Aviv	4	3	1	0	7	1	+6	10	Qualified to Quarter-finals	—	2–0		0–0	
2	Bnei Yehuda	4	2	0	2	4	5	−1	6	Qualified to Quarter-finals		—	1–0		2–0
3	Maccabi Petah Tikva	4	2	0	2	4	6	−2	6	Qualified to Quarter-finals	0–3		—	3–2	
4	Maccabi Netanya	4	1	1	2	7	8	−1	4			3–1		—	2–4
5	Hapoel Ra'anana	4	1	0	3	5	7	−2	3		1–2		0–1		—

Updated to match(es) played on 27 September 2017. Source: Israel Football Association
Rules for classification: 1) points; 2) goal difference; 3) number of wins; 4) goals scored; 5) head to head; 6)deciding match.

=== Group C ===
Pos	Team	Pld	W	D	L	GF	GA	GD	Pts	Qualification or relegation	BEI	HBS	ASH	HAS
1	Beitar Jerusalem	3	2	0	1	7	3	+4	6	Qualified to Quarter-finals	—			1–2
2	Hapoel Be'er Sheva	3	2	0	1	5	3	+2	6	Qualified to Quarter-finals	0–3	—		3–0
3	F.C. Ironi Ashdod	3	1	0	2	2	5	−3	3		1–3	0–2	—	
4	Hapoel Ashkelon	3	1	0	2	2	5	−3	3				0–1	—

Updated to match(es) played on 12 August 2017. Source: Israel Football Association
Rules for classification: 1) points; 2) goal difference; 3) number of wins; 4) goals scored; 5) head to head; 6)deciding match.

== Knockout stage ==
All times are in Israel Standard Time

=== Quarter-finals ===
7 October 2017	Maccabi Petah Tikva	1–2	Hapoel Be'er Sheva	Petah Tikva
21:00	Brik 38'	Report	50'Sahar; 85' Radi	Stadium: HaMoshava Stadium; Attendance: 1,000; Referee: Tzvika Levi

24 October 2017	Maccabi Haifa	2–2 (a.e.t.) (4–3 p)	Hapoel Acre	Haifa
21:00	Caio 21'; Lavi 99'	Report	69' Onyekachi; 109' El Krenawy	Stadium: Sammy Ofer Stadium; Attendance: 1,500; Referee: Idan Leiba
	Penalties
	Awad (penalty scored); Alberman (penalty scored); Sallalich (penalty scored); Kahat (penalty scored)		(penalty missed) Azubel; (penalty scored) Sam; (penalty scored) El Krenawy; (penalty scored) Eliyahu; (penalty missed) Zino

25 October 2017	Hapoel Kiryat Shmona	w/o (Note: Hapoel Kiryat Shmona originally won the match 1–0. However, at the beginning of the second half Beitar had substituted in a sixth foreign player, when a maximum of five foreign players was allowed, and played with six foreign players until the 65th minute. The game was awarded to Hapoel Kiryat Shmona with a score of 3–0.)	Beitar Jerusalem	Kiryat Shmona
21:00	Gozlan 67'	Report		Stadium: Municipal Stadium; Referee: Yigal Fried

26 October 2017	Maccabi Tel Aviv	3–0	Bnei Yehuda	Netanya
19:00	Atar 42'; Blackman 78' (pen.); Rikan 79'	Report		Stadium: Netanya Stadium; Referee: Ro'i Reinschreiber

=== Semi-finals ===
29 November 2017	Hapoel Kiryat Shmona	0–2	Maccabi Tel Aviv	Petah Tikva
20:30			17' Schoenfeld; 53' Yitzhaki	Stadium: HaMoshava Stadium; Referee: Gal Leibovichs

30 November 2017	Maccabi Haifa	0–1	Hapoel Be'er Sheva	Netanya
21:00			72' Ohana	Stadium: Netanya Stadium; Referee: Daniel Bar Natan

=== Final ===
14 December 2017
21:00

Hapoel Be'er Sheva	0–1	Maccabi Tel Aviv
	Report	Kjartansson 83'

Netanya Stadium
Referee: Menashe Mashiah
