= Ofir Mizrahi =

Israeli footballer

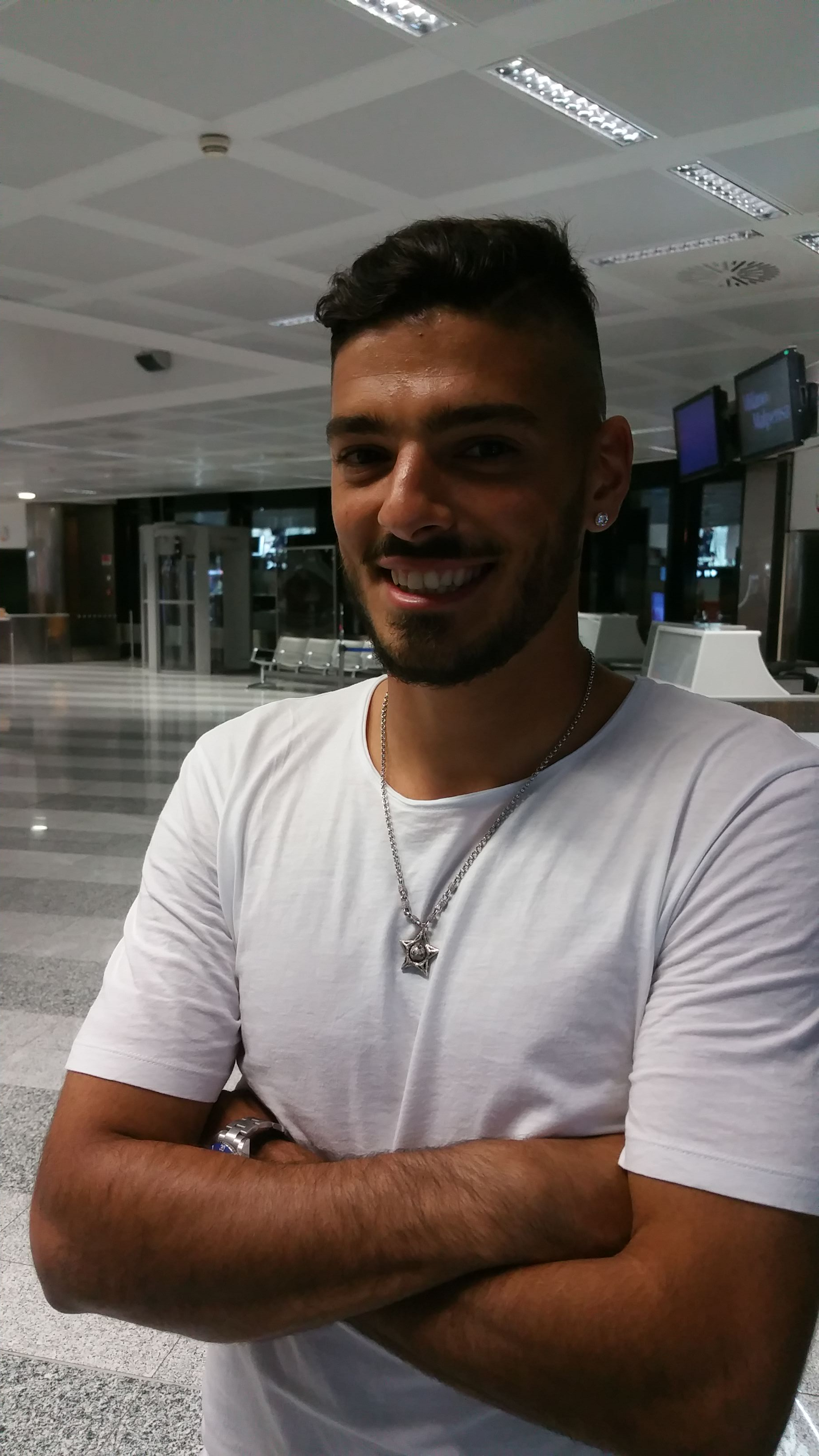
- Mizrahi in October 2016

Personal information
- Full name: Ofir Mizrahi
- Date of birth: December 4, 1993 (age 32)
- Place of birth: Kiryat Motzkin, Israel
- Positions: Midfielder; forward

Youth career
- 2004–2008: Hapoel Haifa
- 2008–2011: F.C. Nesher
- 2011–2013: Ironi Kiryat Shmona

Senior career*
Years	Team	Apps	(Gls)
2012–2017	Ironi Kiryat Shmona	106	(25)
2016–2017	→ FC Lugano (loan)	17	(0)
2017–2019	Maccabi Haifa	28	(6)
2019	→ Maccabi Petah Tikva (loan)	10	(0)
2019–2020	Sektzia Ness Ziona	7	(0)
2020	Hapoel Haifa	9	(1)
2020–2021	Ironi Kiryat Shmona	18	(1)
2021–2023	Ironi Tiberias	63	(18)
2023–2024	Hapoel Nof HaGalil	25	(6)
2024–2025	Hapoel Ra'anana	17	(1)
2025–2026	Ironi Nesher	12	(3)

International career
2013–2015	Israel U21	10	(6)
- * Club domestic league appearances and goals

Ofir Mizrachi (Hebrew: אופיר מזרחי; born December 4, 1993) is an Israeli former footballer who plays as a forward.

== Career ==
Mizrahi born in Kiryat Motzkin, signed to Hapoel Haifa's youth system. After he didn't play, moved to F.C. Nesher, there he played 3 years and scored 81 goals. In summer 2011 he signed to Hapoel Ironi Kiryat Shmona.

On 25 November 2012 Mizrahi made his debut for the senior team against Bnei Yehuda Tel Aviv, and also scored his debut goal. 4 days later he made his UEFA Europa League debut in a 2–0 loss against Athletic Bilbao.

On 23 June 2016 loaned to Raiffeisen Super League club FC Lugano for one year for 25k € with option to purchase 75% for 300k € at the end of the season.

He made his debut at Israel U21 team on August 13, 2013, against Belgium, and in this game he also scored his debut goal.

== Honours ==
Hapoel Ironi Kiryat Shmona

- Israel State Cup: 2013–14
- Israel Super Cup: 2015
