= Or Dasa =

Israeli footballer

Personal information
- Full name: Or Dasa
- Date of birth: 20 September 1998 (age 28)
- Place of birth: Ness Ziona, Israel
- Height: 1.71 m (5 ft 7 in)
- Position: Right winger

Team information
- Current team: Hapoel Nof HaGalil

Youth career
- Maccabi Tel Aviv

Senior career*
Years	Team	Apps	(Gls)
2015–2019	Maccabi Tel Aviv	3	(1)
2018–2019	→ Hapoel Ra'anana (loan)	34	(4)
2019–2021	Hapoel Ra'anana	27	(4)
2020–2021	→ Hapoel Kfar Saba (loan)	28	(2)
2021–2022	Arouca	4	(0)
2022–2023	Hapoel Ramat Gan	15	(1)
2023–2024	Hapoel Acre	26	(1)
2024–2025	Hapoel Umm al-Fahm	33	(4)
2025–2026	F.C. Ashdod	5	(0)
2026	Hapoel Nof HaGalil	15	(3)
2026–	Hapoel Kfar Shalem	0	(0)

International career
2015	Israel U18	3	(0)
2017–2020	Israel U21	11	(1)
- * Club domestic league appearances and goals as of 24 June 2026

Or Dasa (Hebrew: אור דסה; born 20 September 1998) is an Israeli professional footballer who plays as a right winger for Hapoel Kfar Shalem.

== Early life ==
Dasa was born in Ness Ziona, Israel, to an Ethiopian-Jewish family. His older brother Eli Dasa is a footballer who plays for and captains the senior Israel national team.

== Club career ==
=== Maccabi Tel Aviv ===
Having progressed the youth academy of Maccabi Tel Aviv, Dasa made his senior debut for the club on at the age of 16, when he came on as a substitute in a 3–1 loss to Bnei Yehuda. Dasa then continued to represent the club in the UEFA Youth League before making his league debut on 29 October 2017 in a 5–2 win over Hapoel Acre. Seven days later on 12 November 2017, he scored his first goal for the club, netting the winner in a 1–0 victory over Hapoel Ra'anana.

==== Loan to Hapoel Ra'anana ====
In January the following year, Dasa joined Hapoel Ra'anana on loan for the remainder of the season. On 10 February, he received his first-ever red card when he was sent off in a 1–1 draw with Hapoel Haifa.

On 14 August 2020, he signed a one-year contract with Israeli Premier League club Hapoel Kfar Saba, with an option for an additional season.

On 24 July 2021, Dasa moved abroad and signed with the Portuguese Primeira Liga club Arouca. He made four league appearances for the club, in addition to one appearance in the Taça da Liga.

On 28 September 2022, he returned to Israel and signed with Hapoel Ramat Gan Givatayim in the Liga Leumit. A year later, on 27 September 2023, he joined Hapoel Acre, where he scored once in a 4–1 victory over Maccabi Jaffa.

On 4 September 2024, Dasa signed a one-year deal with Hapoel Um al-Fahm. On 21 July 2025, he joined FC Ashdod. Most recently, on 11 February 2026, he signed with Hapoel Nof HaGalil of the Liga Leumit.

== Career statistics ==
=== Club ===
As of match played 6 July 2018

Appearances and goals by club, season and competition
Club	Season	League			FA Cup^{1}		League Cup^{2}		Continental^{3}		Total	
Club	Season	Division	Apps	Goals	Apps	Goals	Apps	Goals	Apps	Goals	Apps	Goals
Maccabi Tel Aviv	2015–16	Israeli Premier League	0	0	1	0	1	0	—		2	0
Maccabi Tel Aviv	2016–17	Israeli Premier League	0	0	0	0	0	0	—		0	0
Maccabi Tel Aviv	2017–18	Israeli Premier League	3	1	1	0	1	0	1	0	6	1
Hapoel Ra'anana (loan)	2017–18	Israeli Premier League	10	1	3	1	0	0	0	0	13	2
Career total			13	2	5	1	2	0	1	0	21	3

^{1} Includes Israel State Cup matches.
^{2} Includes Toto Cup matches.
^{3} Includes UEFA Europa League matches.
