= Amran El Krenawy =

Israeli footballer

Personal information
- Date of birth: 21 February 1996 (age 30)
- Place of birth: Rahat, Israel
- Height: 1.72 m (5 ft 7 1/2 in)
- Position: Winger

Team information
- Current team: F.C. Dimona

Youth career
- 2009–2016: Hapoel Be'er Sheva

Senior career*
Years	Team	Apps	(Gls)
2016–2020	Hapoel Be'er Sheva	0	(0)
2016–2017	→ Hapoel Bnei Lod	33	(3)
2017–2018	→ Hapoel Acre	18	(1)
2018	→ Bnei Sakhnin	10	(0)
2018–2019	→ F.C. Ashdod	8	(0)
2020	→ F.C. Kafr Qasim	17	(1)
2020–2022	F.C. Kafr Qasim	38	(2)
2022–2024	F.C. Dimona	50	(10)
2024–2025	Ironi Modi'in	4	(0)
2025	Maccabi Yavne	7	(1)
2025–	F.C. Dimona	9	(2)
- * Club domestic league appearances and goals as of 1 June 2025

Amran El Krenawy (Arabic: عمران القريناوي, Hebrew: עמראן אלקרינאווי; born 21 February 1996) is an Israeli footballer who plays for F.C. Dimona from the Liga Alef as a winger.

== Early life ==
El Krnawy was born in Rahat, Israel, to a Muslim-Arab family of Bedouin descent.

== Career ==
=== Hapoel Bnei Lod ===
In the 2016–17 season Kafr Qasim loaned El Krenawy to Hapoel Bnei Lod.

=== Hapoel Acre & Bnei Sakhnin ===
In the 2017–18 season El Krenawy was loaned to Hapoel Acre. On 2 August 2017, El Krenawy debuted in the football association in a 1–2 win over Hapoel Haifa in the Toto Cup. On 8 August 2017, El Krenawy scored his first goal in Hapoel Acre in a 2–1 win over Bnei Sakhnin in the Toto Cup.

=== Ashdod ===
In the 2018–19 season El Krenawy was loaned to Ashdod.
