= Khaled Khalaila =

Israeli footballer

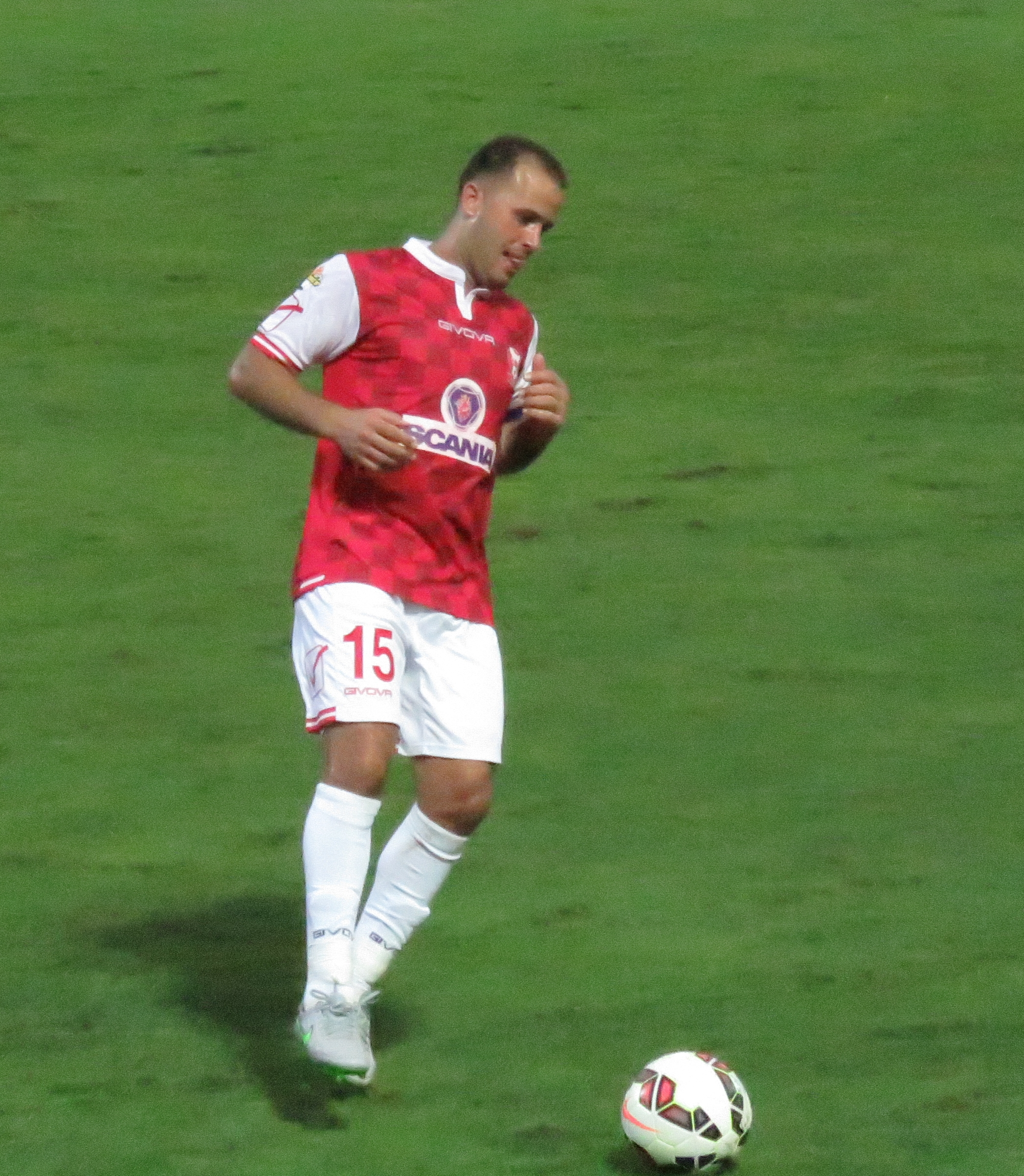
- Khalaila playing for Bnei Sakhnin in 2015

Personal information
- Full name: Khaled Khalaila
- Date of birth: 16 December 1982 (age 43)
- Place of birth: Sakhnin, Israel
- Height: 1.69 m (5 ft 6 1/2 in)
- Position: Defensive midfielder

Senior career*
Years	Team	Apps	(Gls)
2000–2019	Bnei Sakhnin	428	(13)
2020–2023	Maccabi Tamra	64	(0)
- * Club domestic league appearances and goals

Khaled Khalaila (Arabic: خالد خليلة, Hebrew: חאלד חלאילה; born 16 December 1982) is an Israeli former footballer who played as a defensive midfielder.

== See also ==
- List of one-club men
