= Lotem Zino =

Israeli footballer

Lotem Zino לוטם זינו
Personal information
- Full name: Lotem Zino
- Date of birth: 16 March 1992 (age 34)
- Place of birth: Beersheva, Israel
- Position: Defensive midfielder

Team information
- Current team: Hapoel Ashkelon F.C.

Youth career
- Hapoel Be'er Sheva

Senior career*
Years	Team	Apps	(Gls)
2011–2014	Hapoel Be'er Sheva	57	(2)
2014–2017	FC Thun	6	(0)
2016	→ Hapoel Tel Aviv (loan)	2	(0)
2017–2018	Hapoel Acre	25	(1)
2018–2020	Hapoel Ashkelon	58	(1)

International career
2013–2014	Israel U21	4	(0)
- * Club domestic league appearances and goals as of 19 November 2017

Lotem Zino (Hebrew: לוטם זינו; born 16 March 1992) is an Israeli former footballer who played as a midfielder. Lotem is the nephew of Eli Zino, former chairman of Hapoel Be'er Sheva.

Zino made his debut in Hapoel Be'er Sheva against Ironi Nir Ramat HaSharon on 17 September 2011. On 22 March 2012 he scored his first career 94 minutes in 1–2 victory against FC Ashdod.

On 3 July 2014, he moved to FC Thun, but 8 days later tore the ligament and would be gone for six months.

On 7 January 2016, he joined Hapoel Tel Aviv on loan for six month.

== Statistics ==
As 22 July 2014

Club	Season	League		Cup		League Cup		Continental		Total	
Club	Season	Apps	Goals	Apps	Goals	Apps	Goals	Apps	Goals	Apps	Goals
Hapoel Be'er Sheva	2011–12	20	1	1	0	2	0	0	0	23	1
Hapoel Be'er Sheva	2012–13	10	1	0	0	7	0	0	0	17	0
Hapoel Be'er Sheva	2013–14	27	0	3	0	0	0	0	0	30	0
Hapoel Be'er Sheva	Total	57	2	4	0	9	0	0	0	70	2
FC Thun	2014–15	0	0	0	0	0	0	0	0	0	0
FC Thun	Total	0	0	0	0	0	0	0	0	0	0
Total Career		57	2	4	0	9	0	0	0	70	2
