= Yonatan Levi =

Israeli footballer (born 1998)

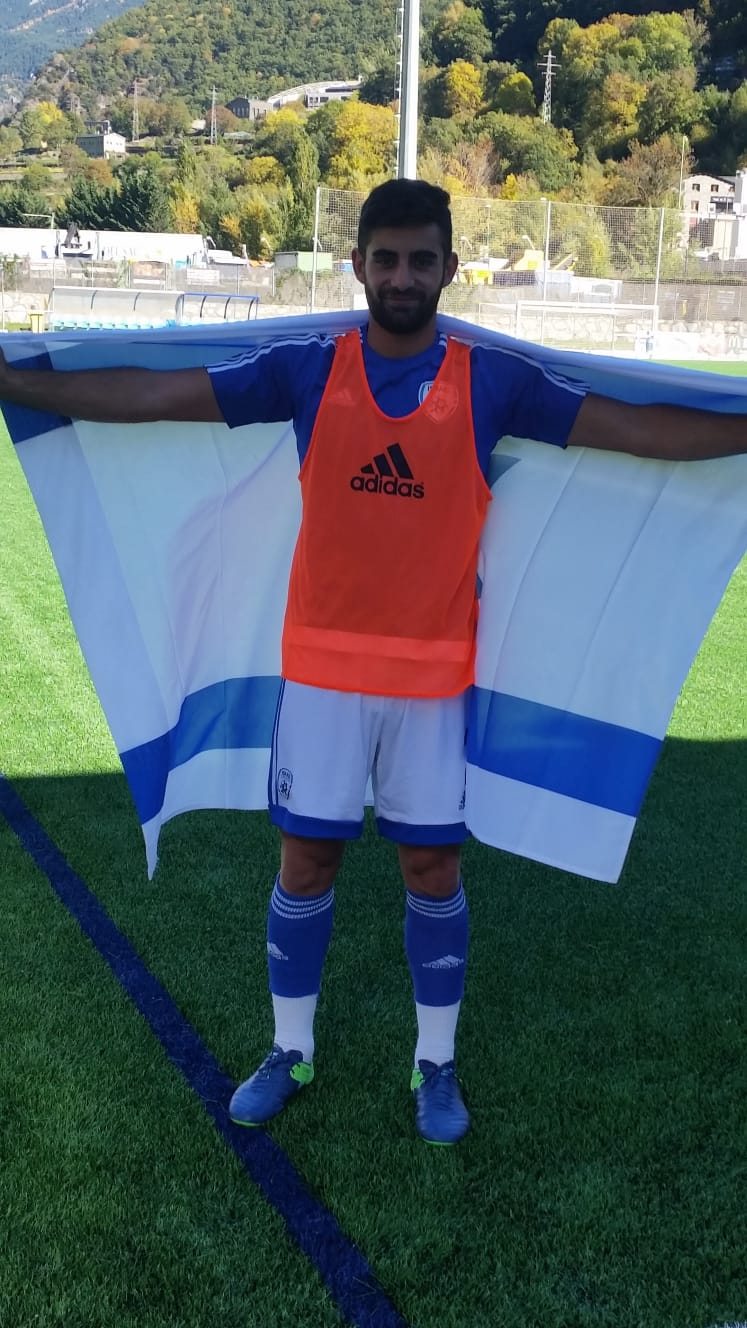
- Yonatan Levi playing for Israeli Youth National Team

Personal information
- Full name: Yonatan Levi
- Date of birth: 2 January 1998 (age 28)
- Place of birth: Prazon, Israel
- Position: Left back

Team information
- Current team: Hapoel Nof HaGalil

Youth career
- Hapoel Asi Gilboa
- Maccabi Haifa

Senior career*
Years	Team	Apps	(Gls)
2017–2022	Maccabi Haifa	10	(0)
2018–2019	→ Hapoel Hadera	6	(0)
2019	→ Hapoel Nof HaGalil	12	(0)
2019–2020	→ Sektzia Ness Ziona	6	(0)
2020–2021	→ Hapoel Iksal	14	(0)
2021–2022	→ Hapoel Kfar Saba	17	(0)
2022–	Hapoel Nof HaGalil	27	(0)
- * Club domestic league appearances and goals as of 15 June 2023

Yonatan Levi (Hebrew: יונתן לוי; born 2 January 1998) is an Israeli professional footballer who currently plays for Hapoel Kfar Saba.

== Club career ==
=== Maccabi Haifa ===
A product of Hapoel Asi Gilboa and Maccabi Haifa's youth system, Levi began his career in the youth teams of Maccabi Haifa. In 2017, he joined Maccabi Haifa's senior team and made his Israeli Premier League debut on May 13, 2017, in a 2–1 loss against Hapoel Be'er Sheva in the 2016 Ligat Ha'al Toto Cup. Levi would be later loaned out to Hapoel Hadera.

=== Hapoel Hadera ===
On Sep 2, 2018, Yonatan Levi was loaned out to Hapoel Hadera from Maccabi Haifa until Feb 3, 2019. After 6 appearances for Hapoel Hadera, Levi scored his first league goal and game winner against Sektzia Ness Ziona on Dec 21, 2018 in a 1–0 victory in the second round of the State Cup of Israel (Hebrew: גביע המדינה, Gvia HaMedina).

=== Sektzia Ness Ziona ===
Levi was later loaned to Sektzia Ness Ziona where he started regularly and played as a left and center back. Levi received his first league red card by yellow card accumulation in the 89th minute of a 1–1 tie against Hapoel Tel Aviv.

=== Hapoel Iksal ===
After his loan to Sektzia Ness Ziona expired in February 2020 Levi was then loaned to Hapoel Iksal until June 30 of 2021.

=== Hapoel Kfar Saba ===
On October 11, 2021, Levi signed with Hapoel Kfar Saba as a free agent, making his debut in a substitution appearance 4 days later in a regular season match against F.C. Kafr Qasim that ended in a 2–2 draw.

=== Hapoel Nof Hagalil ===
Levi currently plays for Liga Leumit side Hapoel Nof HaGalil which he joined on a free transfer in August 2022.

== Club career statistics ==
As of match played 5 October 2023

Club	Season	Division	League		Cup		Europe		Total	
Club	Season	Division	Apps	Goals	Apps	Goals	Apps	Goals	Apps	Goals
Maccabi Haifa	2015–16	Israeli Premier League	0	0	1	0	0	0	1	0
Maccabi Haifa	2016–17	Israeli Premier League	2	0	6	0	5	0	7	0
Maccabi Haifa	2017–18	Israeli Premier League	8	0	4	0	0	0	10	0
Hapoel Hadera	2018–19	Israeli Premier League	6	0	1	1	0	0	7	1
Hapoel Nazareth Illit	2018–19	Liga Leumit	12	0	0	0	0	0	12	0
Sektzia Ness Ziona	2019–20	Israeli Premier League	6	0	2	0	0	0	6	0
Hapoel Iksal	2020–21	Liga Leumit	14	0	1	1	0	0	15	1
Hapoel Kfar Saba	2021–22	Liga Leumit	17	0	1	0	0	0	18	0
Hapoel Nof HaGalil	2022–23	Liga Leumit	27	0	1	0	0	0	21	0
Career total			92	0	17	2	5	0	114	2
