= Allyson (footballer, born 1990) =

Brazilian footballer

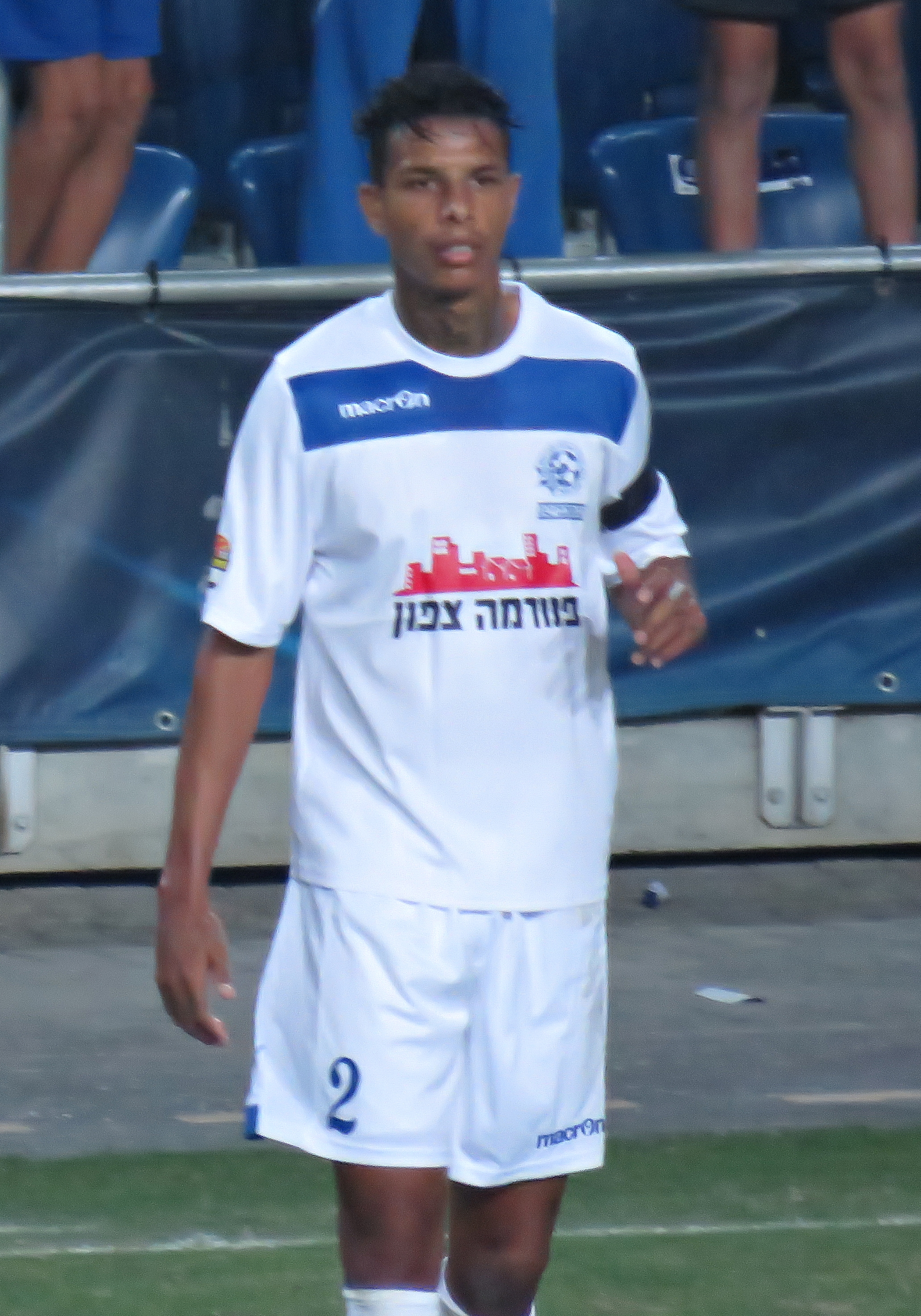
- Allyson with Maccabi Petah Tikva in 2015

Personal information
- Full name: Allyson Aires dos Santos
- Date of birth: 23 October 1990 (age 36)
- Place of birth: São Paulo, Brazil
- Height: 1.85 m (6 ft 1 in)
- Position: Defender

Team information
- Current team: Avaí
- Number: 3

Youth career
- Nacional-SP

Senior career*
Years	Team	Apps	(Gls)
2012–2013	Nacional-SP	16	(3)
2013	→ Grêmio Barueri (loan)	17	(0)
2013–2015	Independente de Limeira	38	(3)
2015–2017	Maccabi Petah Tikva	59	(0)
2017–2019	Maccabi Haifa	47	(0)
2019–2021	Bnei Yehuda	45	(1)
2021–2022	Bandırmaspor	28	(0)
2022–2023	Ümraniyespor	15	(0)
2023–2024	Cuiabá	23	(1)
2024–2025	Sport Recife	7	(0)
2025	→ Botafogo-SP (loan)	7	(1)
2025	Guarani	6	(0)
2026–	Avaí	39	(2)
- * Club domestic league appearances and goals as of 18 November 2026

Allyson Aires dos Santos (born 23 October 1990), simply known as Allyson, is a Brazilian professional footballer who plays as a defender for Avaí.

== Career ==
Born in São Paulo, Allyson started his career with hometown side Nacional-SP in 2012, playing in the Campeonato Paulista Segunda Divisão.

He joined Grêmio Barueri on loan, where he was a regular starter in the 2013 Campeonato Paulista Série A2.

He signed for Independente de Limeira on 21 August 2013.

In December 2014, after establishing himself as an undisputed starter at Independente, Allyson went on a trial at Mexican club Atlante, but a permanent move never materialized and he returned to Independente.

On 17 July 2015, he joined Maccabi Petah Tikva of the Israeli Premier League.

On 28 May 2017, after being a first-choice, he moved to fellow league team Maccabi Haifa on a three-year contract.

After losing his starting spot, Allyson joined Bnei Yehuda, also in the Israeli first division on 17 September 2019.

On 23 June 2021, he moved to Bandırmaspor of the Turkish TFF First League.

On 20 June 2022, Allyson signed a contract with Süper Lig side Ümraniyespor.

On 6 April 2023, he returned to his home country after nearly eight years, after being announced at Série A side Cuiabá.

== Honours ==
Maccabi Petah Tikva

- Toto Cup: 2015–16
