= Ali Ottman =

Israeli footballer

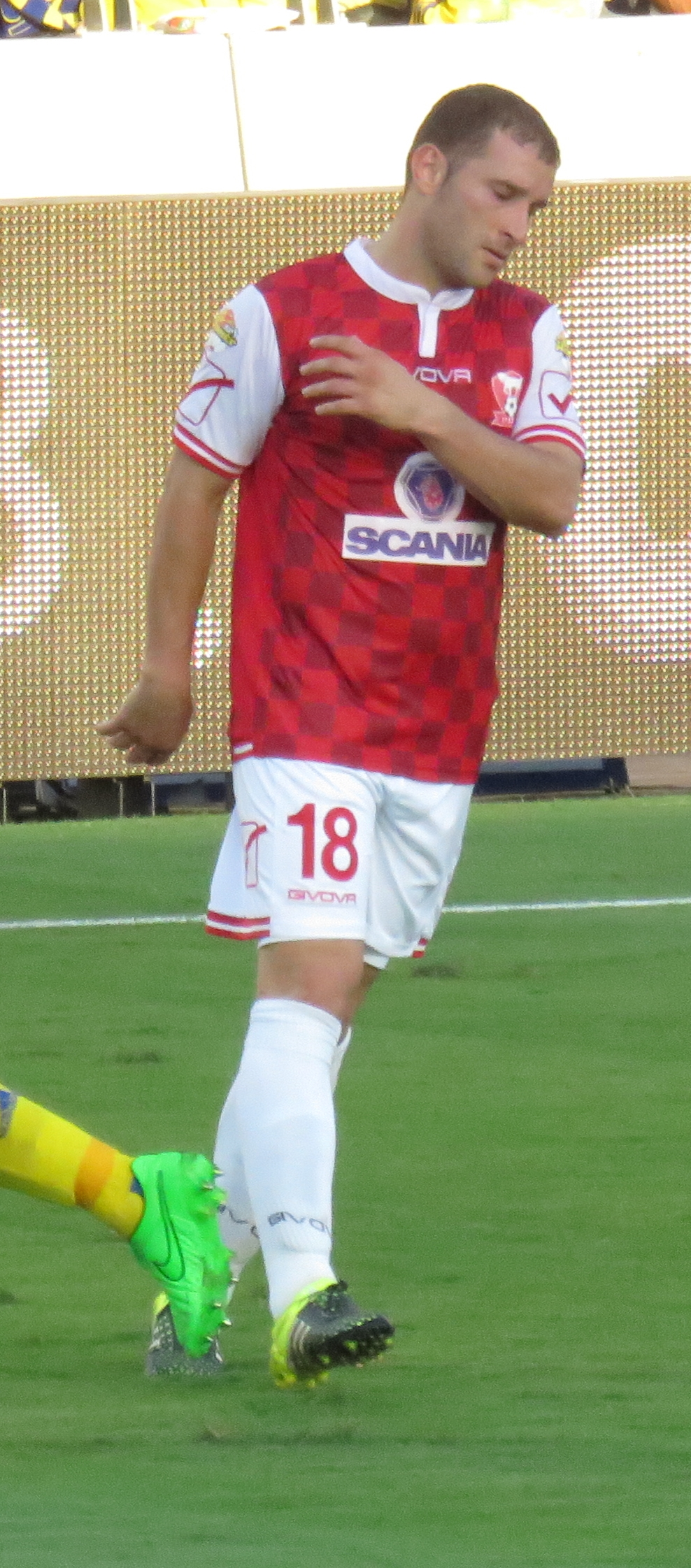
- Ottman playing for Bnei Sakhnin in 2015

Personal information
- Full name: Ali Ottman
- Date of birth: February 8, 1987 (age 39)
- Place of birth: Sakhnin, Israel
- Height: 1.74 m (5 ft 8 1/2 in)
- Position: Right back

Youth career
- Bnei Sakhnin

Senior career*
Years	Team	Apps	(Gls)
2006–2009	Bnei Sakhnin	47	(0)
2009–2013	Maccabi Haifa	58	(1)
2012–2013	→ Bnei Sakhnin (loan)	25	(1)
2013–2021	Bnei Sakhnin	220	(10)
2021	Hapoel Qalansawe	3	(0)
2022	Ihud Bnei Shefa-'Amr	10	(0)
2022	Ahva Kafr Manda	7	(0)
2022–2023	Ironi Bnei Kabul	22	(2)
2024–	Tzeiri Sakhnin	1	(0)

International career
2010	Israel	2	(0)
- * Club domestic league appearances and goals as of 1 June 2023

Ali Ottman (Arabic: علي عثمان, Hebrew: עלי עותמאן; born February 8, 1987) is an Israeli footballer.
