= 2018–19 Maccabi Haifa F.C. season =

Maccabi Haifa
2018–19 season
- Chairman: Ya'akov Shahar
- Manager: Fred Rutten (until 1 November 2018); Rob Maas (interim); Eli Guttman (8 November-3 December 2018); Itay Mordechai (interim); Marco Balbul (19 December 2018-)
- Stadium: Sammy Ofer
- Ligat Ha'Al: 2nd
- State Cup: Round of 16
- Toto Cup: Runners-up
- Top goalscorer: League: Mohammed Awaed; Nikita Rukavytsya; Shon Weissman (8 each); All: Nikita Rukavytsya (12)
- Highest home attendance: 29,998 (vs Hapoel Haifa, 2 December 2018)
- Lowest home attendance: 3,500 (vs Hapoel Marmorek, 22 December 2018)
- Average home league attendance: 17,965

The 2018–19 season was Maccabi Haifa's 61st season in Israeli Premier League, and their 37th consecutive season in the top division of Israeli football.

== Club ==
=== Kits ===
- Provider: Nike, Inc.
- Main Sponsor: Volvo
- Secondary Sponsor: Pointer and Variety Israel

Home	Away	3rd	GK	GK 2	GK 3

=== Squad information ===
N	Pos.	Nat.	Name	Age	EU	Since	App	Goals	Ends	Transfer fee	Notes
2	DF	(Brazil)	Allyson	27	Non-EU	2017/18	62	1	2019/2020	Free	
4	DF	(Netherlands)	Etiënne Reijnen	31	EU	2017/18	38	0	2018/2019	Free	
5	DF	(Israel)	Rami Gershon	30	Non-EU	2017/18	50	0	2021/2022	750,000€	
6	MF	(Israel)	Gal Alberman	35	EU	2017/18	43	0	2018/2019	Free	
7	MF	(Israel)	Sintayehu Sallalich	27	Non-EU	2017/18	86	11	2020/2021	Free	
9	FW	(Israel)	Mohammed Awaed	21	Non-EU	2014/15	73	11	2020/2021	Youth system	
10	MF	(Turkey)	Kerim Frei	25	Non-EU	2018/19	16	1	2018/2019	Free	
11	FW	(Israel)	Yarden Shua	19	Non-EU	2018/19	16	3	2023/2024	1,400,000€	
12	DF	(Israel)	Sun Menahem	24	Non-EU	2016/17	76	3	2020/2021		
13	FW	(Australia)	Nikita Rukavytsya	31	EU	2016/17	108	40	2018/2019	400,000€	Israel Resident
14	MF	(Cameroon)	Georges Mandjeck	29	Non-EU	2018/19	36	5	2018/2019	Youth system	
15	DF	(Israel)	Ofri Arad	19	Non-EU	2017/18	24	1	2019/2020	Youth system	
16	MF	(Israel)	Mohammad Abu Fani	20	Non-EU	2018/19	13	1	?	Free	
19	MF	(Israel)	Roi Kahat	26	Non-EU	2016/17	83	10	2019/2020	1,000,000€	
21	DF	(Israel)	Ayid Habshi	23	Non-EU	2013/14	71	0	2019/2020	Youth system	
22	GK	(Israel)	Gil Ofek	32	Non-EU	2015/16	2	0	2018/2019	Free	Originally from youth system
25	DF	(Israel)	Raz Meir	22	Non-EU	2014/15	51	2	2018/2019	Free	
26	DF	(Cameroon)	Ernest Mabouka	30	Non-EU	2017/18	75	0	2018/2019	€400,000	
27	FW	(Israel)	Shon Weissman	22	Non-EU	2013/14	49	10	2018/2019	Youth system	
28	MF	(Israel)	Maxim Plakuschenko	23	Non-EU	2018/19	16	0	2018/2019	420,000€	
31	MF	(Israel)	Neta Lavi (captain)	21	Non-EU	2015/16	123	5	2021/2022	Youth system	
32	MF	(Israel)	Timothy Muzie	17	Non-EU	2018/19	0	0	2022/2023	Youth system	
55	GK	(Israel)	Omri Glazer	22	Non-EU	2016/17	67	0	2020/2021	250,000€	
77	GK	(Israel)	Guy Haimov	32	Non-EU	2018/19	37	0	2020/2021	Free	

- Last updated: 26 May 2019
- Source: mhaifafc.com, Israel Football Association, UEFA Players transfer,
- Ordered by squad number.

=== Current coaching staff ===
Position	Staff
Head coach	(Israel) Marco Balbul
Assistant Coach	(Portugal) Luís Boa Morte
Assistant Coach	(Israel) Itay Mordechai
Club Administrator	(Israel) Rafi Osmo
Fitness Coach	(Israel) Eran Shado
Fitness Coach	(Israel) Uri Harel
Goalkeeping Coach	(Israel) Giora Antman
Analyst	(Israel) Idan Yona
Club doctor	(Israel) Dr. Ami Berber
Physiotherapist	(Israel) Tomer Bassan
Physiotherapist	(Israel) Sergei Kotov
Masseur	(Israel) Alexander Rubenchik
Logistic	(Israel) Shlomi Elimelech
Logistic	(Israel) Shay Bar
Development Manager Mental	(Croatia) Giovanni Rosso

Last updated: 19 March 2019
Source: F.C. Maccabi Haifa Official Website

== Transfers ==
=== In ===
Date	Pos.	Player	Age	Moving from	Type	Fee	Notes	Source
3 June 2018	FW	(Netherlands) Michiel Kramer	29	(Netherlands) Sparta Rotterdam	Free agent	Free		
1 July 2018	FW	(Israel) Shon Weissman	23	(Israel) Ironi Kiryat Shmona	Loan returns	Free		
1 July 2018	DF	(Israel) Sun Menahem	24	(Israel) Ironi Kiryat Shmona	Loan returns	Free		
1 July 2018	DF	(Israel) Yahav Gurfinkel	20	(Israel) Hapoel Nazareth Illit	Loan returns	Free		
1 July 2018	DF	(Israel) Ayid Habshi	23	(Israel) Bnei Yehuda Tel Aviv	Loan returns	Free		
1 July 2018	DF	(Israel) Ofri Arad	19	(Israel) Hapoel Ramat Gan	Loan returns	Free		
24 July 2018	DF	(Cameroon) Georges Mandjeck	29	(Czech Republic) Sparta Prague	Loan in	Free		
6 August 2018	GK	(Israel) Guy Haimov	32	(Israel) Hapoel Be'er Sheva	Free agent	Free		
14 September 2018	MF	(Guinea) Seydouba Soumah	27	(Serbia) FK Partizan	Loan in	Free		
9 January 2019	FW	(Israel) Yarden Shua	19	(Israel) Bnei Yehuda Tel Aviv	Transfer	€1,400,000		
15 January 2019	MF	(Israel) Mohammad Abu Fani	20	(Israel) Hapoel Hadera	Loan returns	Free		
25 January 2019	MF	(Israel) Maxim Plakuschenko	23	(Israel) Hapoel Haifa	Transfer	€420,000		
25 January 2019	MF	(Chile) Manuel Iturra	34	(Spain) Villarreal	Free agent	Free		
1 February 2019	MF	(Turkey) Kerim Frei	25	(Turkey) Başakşehir	Loan in	Free		

=== Out ===
Date	Pos.	Player	Age	Moving to	Type	Fee	Notes	Source
4 May 2018	DF	(Iceland) Hólmar Örn Eyjólfsson	27	(Bulgaria) Levski Sofia	Transfer	Free		
1 June 2018	FW	(Israel) Omer Damari	29	(Germany) RB Leipzig	End of Loan	Free		
5 June 2018	MF	(Israel) Maor Buzaglo	30	Free agent	End of contract	Free		
8 July 2018	MF	(Israel) Mohammad Abu Fani	20	(Israel) Hapoel Hadera	Loan out	Free		
8 July 2018	GK	(Israel) Roee Fucs	19	(Israel) Hapoel Rishon LeZion	Loan out	Free		
8 July 2018	FW	(Israel) Gil Hadad	18	(Israel) Sektzia Nes Tziona	Loan out	Free		
1 July 2018	MF	(Bulgaria) Georgi Kostadinov	27	(Russia) Arsenal Tula	Transfer	€20000		
6 August 2018	DF	(Israel) Omri Ben Harush	27	(Belgium) K.S.C. Lokeren	Transfer	Free		
22 August 2018	DF	(Israel) Yahav Gurfinkel	20	(Israel) Hapoel Hadera	Loan out	Free		
23 August 2018	FW	(Greece) Stefanos Athanasiadis	29		Release	Free		
26 August 2018	DF	(Israel) Yonatan Levi	20	(Israel) Hapoel Hadera	Loan out	Free		
11 September 2018	GK	(Israel) Ohad Levita	32	(Israel) Hapoel Be'er Sheva	Release	Free		
17 September 2018	MF	(Brazil) Caio	32	(Israel) Hapoel Tel Aviv	Loan out	Free		
1 January 2019	MF	(Israel) Yam Cohen	20	(Israel) Hapoel Nazareth Illit	Loan out	Free		
23 January 2019	FW	(Netherlands) Michiel Kramer	30	(Netherlands) FC Utrecht	Release	Free		
29 January 2019	MF	(Israel) Ofir Mizrahi	25	(Israel) Maccabi Petah Tikva	Loan out	Free		
30 January 2019	MF	(Israel) Shlomi Azulay	28	(Israel) Hapoel Haifa	Loan out	Free		
31 January 2019	MF	(Israel) Amit Zenati	21	(Israel) Bnei Yehuda Tel Aviv	Loan out	Free		
4 February 2019	MF	(Guinea) Seydouba Soumah	27	Free agent	End of Loan	Free		
20 May 2019	MF	(Chile) Manuel Iturra	34	Free agent	End of contract	Free		

== Pre-season and friendlies ==
Win Draw Loss Postponed

4 July 2018	Maccabi Haifa	4 – 0	Hapoel Iksal	Kfar Galim Training Ground
	Weissman 2', 46'; Awaed 5'; Menahem 51'	Report

11 July 2018 Training Camp	Maccabi Haifa (Israel)	15 – 2	(Netherlands) VV Baarlo	Baarlo, Netherlands
20:00	Rukavytsya 3', 29'; Kramer 5'; Azulay 10', 23'; Mizrahi 24', 28'; Weissman 48'; Awaed 50', 72'; Caio 57', 69', 78'; Kahat 63'; 88' (o.g.)	Report	65' (pen.); Bram Reumkens 87'

13 July 2018 Training Camp	Maccabi Haifa (Israel)	4 – 0	(Germany) SV Straelen	Baarlo, Netherlands
20:00	Gershon 44'; Rukavytsya 67'; Weissman 76'; Ben Harush 87'	Report

14 July 2018 Training Camp	Maccabi Haifa (Israel)	6 – 0	(Netherlands) FC Utrecht U23	Baarlo, Netherlands
16:00	Weissman 22'; Azulay 35', 51'; Awaed 47', 50'; Kahat 83'	Report

18 July 2018 Training Camp	Maccabi Haifa (Israel)	1 – 1	(Netherlands) Sparta Rotterdam	Baarlo, Netherlands
17:00	Azulay 45'	Report	Drenthe 75' (pen.)

18 July 2018 Training Camp	Maccabi Haifa (Israel)	0 – 0	(Netherlands) RKC Waalwijk	Baarlo, Netherlands
19:00		Report

29 July 2018	Maccabi Haifa	1 – 1	Hapoel Nazareth Illit
	Yam Cohen 76' (pen.)	[ Report]	Julio Cesar 51'

9 August 2018	Maccabi Haifa	4 – 0	Ironi Tiberias	Kfar Galim Training Ground
	Amit Zenati, Timothy Muzie; Ofri Arad	[ Report]

8 September 2018	Maccabi Haifa	3 – 0	F.C. Robi Shapira	Kfar Galim Training Ground
	Kahat 23'; Sallalich 46'; Kramer 78'	Report

18 September 2018	Maccabi Haifa	5 – 0	Ironi Tiberias	Kfar Galim Training Ground
	Zenati,, Kahat; Soumah	Report

== Competitions ==
=== Overview ===
Competition	First match	Last match	Starting round	Final position	Record							
Competition	First match	Last match	Starting round	Final position	Pld	W	D	L	GF	GA	GD	Win %
Ligat Ha'Al	25 August 2018	20 May 2019	Matchday 1	Runners-up	36	16	10	10	46	41	+5	44.44
State Cup	22 December 2018	22 January 2019	Eighth Round	Round of 16	2	1	0	1	5	1	+4	50.00
Toto Cup	28 July 2018	26 September 2018	Group stage	Runners-up	6	2	3	1	11	7	+4	33.33
Total					44	19	13	12	62	49	+13	43.18

Last updated: 26 May 2019.
Source: Competitions

== Ligat Ha'Al ==
=== Regular season ===
Win Draw Loss

26 August 2018 1	Maccabi Tel Aviv	2 – 0	Maccabi Haifa	Netanya
21:00	Amador (yellow card) 29'; Rikan (yellow card) 39'; Shechter 67'; Dasa (yellow card) 75'; Peretz 77'	Report	dos Santos (yellow card) 14'; Lavi (yellow card) 38'; Kramer (red card) 68'; Awaed (yellow card) 70'; Weissman (yellow card) 82'; Azulay (yellow card) 90+1'	Stadium: Netanya Stadium; Attendance: 12,359; Referee: Ziv Adler

1 September 2018 2	Maccabi Haifa	2 – 0	F.C. Ashdod	Haifa
18:45	Menahem (yellow card) 33'; Awaed 50'; Azulay (yellow card) 55'; Mabouka (yellow card) 76'; Mandjeck (yellow card) 90'; Weissman 90+5'	Report	Bitton (red card) 79'; Habran (yellow card) 76'	Stadium: Sammy Ofer Stadium; Attendance: 13,174; Referee: David Foxman

16 September 2018 3	Bnei Yehuda Tel Aviv	1 - 1	Maccabi Haifa	Petah Tikva
20:30	Yarden Shua 7'; Baltaxa (yellow card) 63'; Konstantini (yellow card) 65'	Report	Mandjeck 12', (yellow card) 37'; Menahem (yellow card) 18'; Weissman (yellow card) 47'; Awaed (yellow card) 88'	Stadium: HaMoshava Stadium; Attendance: 6,500; Referee: Eitan Shmuelevitz

22 September 2018 4	Maccabi Haifa	1 - 2	Maccabi Petah Tikva	Haifa
19:45	Mandjeck 34'; Azulay (yellow card) 43'; Weissman (yellow card) 52'; Zenati (yellow card) 76' (yellow-red card) 82'; Habshi (yellow card) 90+3'	Report	Gal Shish (yellow card) 3'; Kanyuk (yellow card) 40', (goal) 89'; Johan Martial (yellow card) 53'; Tai Baribo 56'; Sarsour (yellow card) 74'	Stadium: Sammy Ofer Stadium; Attendance: 14,270; Referee: Igal Frid

1 October 2018 5	Maccabi Haifa	0 - 0	Hapoel Be'er Sheva	Haifa
20:00	Kramer (yellow card) 63'; Mandjeck (yellow card) 83'	Report	Sabo (yellow card) 53'; Bitton (yellow card) 57'; Harush (yellow card) 63'	Stadium: Sammy Ofer Stadium; Attendance: 19,431; Referee: Liran Liany

6 October 2018 6	Hapoel Ra'anana	1 - 1	Maccabi Haifa	Ramat Gan
18:00	Binyamin (yellow card) 45'; Martín Alaníz 90+1'	Report	Dean Maimoni 54' (o.g.); Awaed (yellow card) 88'	Stadium: Ramat Gan Stadium; Attendance: 4,000; Referee: Erez Papir

22 October 2018 7	Maccabi Haifa	0 - 2	Maccabi Netanya	Haifa
21:00	Mandjeck (yellow card) 45'; Reijnen (red card) 50'; Azulay (yellow card) 54'; Menahem (red card) 90'	Report	Bećiraj (yellow card) 56'; Moti Barshazki (yellow card) 70', (goal) 90+4'; Tiram (yellow card) 77'	Stadium: Sammy Ofer Stadium; Attendance: 13,916; Referee: Sahlom Ben-Avraham

29 October 2018 8	Hapoel Tel Aviv	1 - 2	Maccabi Haifa	Petah Tikva
21:00	Peersman (yellow card) 25'; Caio (yellow card) 28'; Idan Cohen 41', (yellow card) 69'; Shay Elias (yellow card) 57'; Dgani (yellow card) 60'	Report	Awaed 50', 87', (yellow card) 86'; Azulay (yellow card) 73'; Mabouka (yellow card) 81'	Stadium: HaMoshava Stadium; Attendance: 8,500; Referee: Ziv Adler

5 November 2018 9	Maccabi Haifa	1 - 2	Beitar Jerusalem	Haifa
21:00	Weissman 38'; Lavi (yellow card) 42'; Raz Meir (yellow card) 55'; Habshi (yellow card) 81'	Report	Scheimann (yellow card) 14'; Ben Haim (yellow card) 22'; Buzaglo 61'; Inbrum 66'; Kriaf (yellow card) 68'; Miki Siroshtein (yellow card) 78'; Vered (yellow card) 84'	Stadium: Sammy Ofer Stadium; Attendance: 23,000; Referee: Orel Grinfeld

10 November 2018 10	Hapoel Hadera	1 - 2	Maccabi Haifa	Netanya
20:30	Lúcio (yellow card) 22', (goal) 80' (pen.); Abu Fani (yellow card) 42'; Eliel Peretz (yellow card) 44'; Yonatan Levi (yellow card) 82'	Report	Awaed 4'; Rukavytsya 40'; Lavi (yellow card) 73'; Mandjeck (yellow card) 75'	Stadium: Netanya Stadium; Attendance: 6,500; Referee: Alon Yefet

1 December 2018 11	Maccabi Haifa	1 - 3	Hapoel Haifa	Haifa
21:00	Tamaș 72' (o.g.); Rukavytsya (penalty missed) 78; Menahem (yellow card) 90+2'	Report	Ben Azubel 14'; Vermouth 20', 55'	Stadium: Sammy Ofer Stadium; Attendance: 29,998; Referee: Alon Yefet

4 December 2018 12	Bnei Sakhnin	0 - 2	Maccabi Haifa	Sakhnin
20:00	Ihab Ganayem (yellow card) 40'	Report	Awaed 59'; Haimov (yellow card) 77'; Weissman 86'	Stadium: Doha Stadium; Attendance: 2,500; Referee: Igal Frid

8 December 2018 13	Maccabi Haifa	2 - 2	Ironi Kiryat Shmona	Haifa
16:00	Menahem 47'; Azulay 59'; Haimov (yellow card) 90+4'	Report	García 26'; Broun (yellow card) 40'; Bartkus 90+3'	Stadium: Sammy Ofer Stadium; Attendance: 10,500; Referee: Ziv Adler

17 December 2018 14	Maccabi Haifa	1 - 3	Maccabi Tel Aviv	Haifa
21:00	Mandjeck (yellow card) 10'; Azulay (yellow card) 35'; Sallalich 69'; Awaed (yellow card) 70'	Report	Atar 5', 43'; Ruslan Barsky (yellow card) 18'; Peretz 47'; Shachar Piven (yellow card) 55'	Stadium: Sammy Ofer Stadium; Attendance: 24,000; Referee: Liran Liany

26 December 2018 15	F.C. Ashdod	0 - 1	Maccabi Haifa	Ashdod
21:00	Dan Bitton (penalty missed) 30	Report	Rukavytsya 14'; Menahem (yellow card) 90+5'	Stadium: Yud-Alef Stadium; Attendance: 2,300; Referee: Idan Leiba

29 December 2018 16	Maccabi Haifa	1 - 0	Bnei Yehuda Tel Aviv	Haifa
20:30	Rukavytsya 65'; Haimov (yellow card) 90+2'	Report	Konstantini (yellow card) 78' (yellow-red card) 90+5'; Shay Mazor (yellow card) 90+4'	Stadium: Sammy Ofer Stadium; Attendance: 10,348; Referee: Ziv Adler

5 January 2019 17	Maccabi Petah Tikva	1 - 2	Maccabi Haifa	Petah Tikva
18:15	Elkayam (yellow card) 21'; Sivok (yellow card) 53', (goal) 66'	Report	Ayid Habshi (yellow card) 38'; Sallalich 47'; Rukavytsya 53'; Raz Meir (yellow card) 61'	Stadium: HaMoshava Stadium; Attendance: 4,500; Referee: Orel Grinfeld

12 January 2019 18	Hapoel Be'er Sheva	0 - 2	Maccabi Haifa	Be'er Sheva
20:30	Taha (yellow card) 22' (yellow-red card) 50'; Oren Bitton (yellow card) 60'; Tomer Yosefi (yellow card) 79'; Ogu (yellow card) 84'; Dor Elo (yellow card) 84'	Report	Raz Meir (yellow card) 49'; Lavi 71', (yellow card) 77'; Mandjeck (yellow card) 84'; Azulay 90+5'	Stadium: Terner Stadium; Attendance: 14,838; Referee: Roi Reinshreiber

19 January 2019 19	Maccabi Haifa	0 - 0	Hapoel Ra'anana	Haifa
18:15		Report	Oremuš (yellow card) 35'; Vehava (yellow card) 54'; Karem Arshid (yellow card) 68'	Stadium: Sammy Ofer Stadium; Attendance: 17,258; Referee: Idan Leiba

27 January 2019 20	Maccabi Netanya	0 - 0	Maccabi Haifa	Netanya
20:30	Mohamed (yellow card) 4'; Mohamed Zvidat (yellow card) 12'	Report	Habshi (yellow card) 46'; Plakuschenko (yellow card) 78'; Mandjeck (yellow card) 90+3'	Stadium: Netanya Stadium; Attendance: 9,200; Referee: Roi Reinshreiber

4 February 2019 21	Maccabi Haifa	3 - 2	Hapoel Tel Aviv	Haifa
21:00	Awaed 7', 36'; Mabouka (yellow card) 15'; Rukavytsya 19'; Haimov (yellow card) 60'; Frei (yellow card) 68'	Report	Gotlieb 24'; Safouri 37'	Stadium: Sammy Ofer Stadium; Attendance: 17,906; Referee: Daniel Bar Natan

10 February 2019 22	Beitar Jerusalem	1 - 1	Maccabi Haifa	Jerusalem
21:00	Ben Haim (yellow card) 32'; Varenne 45'; Siroshtein (yellow card) 82'	Report	Mandjeck (yellow card) 25' (yellow-red card) 37'; Haimov (yellow card) 38'; Lavi (yellow card) 42'; Raz Meir 45+1'; Mabouka (yellow card) 87'	Stadium: Teddy Stadium; Attendance: 18,500; Referee: Liran Liany

17 February 2019 23	Maccabi Haifa	3 - 1	Hapoel Hadera	Haifa
20:30	Rukavytsya 10'; Frei 35'; Abu Fani 59'	Report	Lúcio (yellow card) 29'; Dia Lababidi (yellow card) 76'; Eliel Peretz 76'	Stadium: Sammy Ofer Stadium; Attendance: 13,894; Referee: Idan Leiba

25 February 2019 24	Hapoel Haifa	0 - 0	Maccabi Haifa	Haifa
21:00	Azubel (yellow card) 87'	Report	Plakuschenko (yellow card) 5'; Abu Fani (yellow card) 55'; Yarden Shua (yellow card) 67'	Stadium: Sammy Ofer Stadium; Attendance: 25,100; Referee: Eitan Shemeulevitch

2 March 2019 25	Maccabi Haifa	2 - 0	Bnei Sakhnin	Haifa
16:00	Mandjeck 30', (yellow card) 82'; Rukavytsya (penalty missed) 44, 78'; Mabouka (yellow card) 52'; Yarden Shua (yellow card) 54'; Frei (yellow card) 60'	Report	Falah (yellow card) 31'; Ihab Ganayem (yellow card) 45+3'; Ottman (yellow card) 49'	Stadium: Sammy Ofer Stadium; Attendance: 15,708; Referee: Sahlom Ben-Avraham

9 March 2019 26	Ironi Kiryat Shmona	2 - 3	Maccabi Haifa	Kiryat Shmona
20:30	Morcillo 34' (pen.), (yellow card) 42'; Yoel Abuhatzira 44'	Report	Raz Meir 3'; Mandjeck (yellow card) 50'; Frei (yellow card) 63'; Weissman 74', 87'	Stadium: Municipal Stadium; Attendance: 3,500; Referee: Igal Frid

==== Regular season table ====
Pos	Team	Pld	W	D	L	GF	GA	GD	Pts	Qualification or relegation
1	Maccabi Tel Aviv	26	20	6	0	57	12	+45	66	Qualification for the Championship round
2	Maccabi Haifa	26	12	8	6	34	27	+7	44	Qualification for the Championship round
3	Maccabi Netanya	26	12	7	7	34	29	+5	43	Qualification for the Championship round
4	Hapoel Be'er Sheva	26	10	9	7	36	32	+4	39	Qualification for the Championship round
5	Bnei Yehuda	26	10	7	9	39	25	+14	37	Qualification for the Championship round

Source: Soccerway
Rules for classification: 1) Points; 2) Goal difference; 3) Matches won; 4) Goals scored; 5) Head-to-head points; 6) Head-to-head goal difference; 7) Head-to-head goals scored; 8) Play-off.

==== Results overview ====
Win Draw Loss

Opposition	Home score	Away score
Beitar Jerusalem	1-2	1-1
Bnei Sakhnin	2-0	2-0
Bnei Yehuda Tel Aviv	1-0	1-1
F.C. Ashdod	2-0	1-0
Hapoel Be'er Sheva	0-0	2-0
Hapoel Haifa	1-3	0-0
Hapoel Hadera	3-1	1-2
Hapoel Ironi Kiryat Shmona	2-2	3-2
Hapoel Ra'anana	0-0	1-1
Hapoel Tel Aviv	3-2	1-2
Maccabi Netanya	0-2	0-0
Maccabi Petah Tikva	1-2	2-1
Maccabi Tel Aviv	1-3	0-2

=== Play-off ===
16 March 2019 27	Maccabi Haifa	0 - 2	Bnei Yehuda Tel Aviv	Haifa
20:30	Mabouka (red card) 45'; Gershon (yellow card) 51'	Report	Sylvestr 24', 45+1' (pen.); Cohen (yellow card) 46'	Stadium: Sammy Ofer Stadium; Attendance: 10,963; Referee: David Foxman

30 March 2019 28	Maccabi Tel Aviv	1 - 0	Maccabi Haifa	Netanya
20:30	Ruslan Barsky (yellow card) 29'; Atzili (yellow card) 52'; Schoenfeld 55'	Report	Abu Fani (yellow card) 90'; Awaed (yellow card) 90'; Lavi (yellow card) 90+1'	Stadium: Netanya Stadium; Attendance: 12,280; Referee: Ziv Adler

6 April 2019 29	Maccabi Haifa	1 - 3	Hapoel Hadera	Haifa
20:30	Rukavytsya 65'	Report	Mateos (yellow card) 17'; Amit Cohen 52'; Eden Karzaev (yellow card) 72', (goal) 90'; Maxim Grechkin (yellow card) 75'; Vitaly Ganon 88'	Stadium: Sammy Ofer Stadium; Attendance: 9,620; Referee: Roi Reinshreiber

14 April 2019 30	Maccabi Haifa	2 - 1	Maccabi Netanya	Haifa
20:30	Yarden Shua 11'; Mandjeck 30'; Lavi (yellow card) 54'; Habshi (yellow card) 63'	Report	Bećiraj 7', (yellow card) 62'; Hyka (yellow card) 26'; Mohamed (yellow card) 44' (yellow-red card) 77'; Melamed (yellow card) 59'	Stadium: Sammy Ofer Stadium; Attendance: 11,158; Referee: Liran Liany

22 April 2019 31	Hapoel Be'er Sheva	0 - 1	Maccabi Haifa	Be'er Sheva
21:00	Sabo (yellow card) 20', (red card) 25'; Tzedek (yellow card) 61'; Elo (yellow card) 90+5'	Report	Reijnen (red card) 30'; Lavi (yellow card) 61'; Habshi (yellow card) 68'; Weissman 84', (yellow card) 90+5'	Stadium: Turner Stadium; Attendance: 15,752; Referee: Eli Hacmon

29 April 2019 32	Bnei Yehuda Tel Aviv	2 - 2	Maccabi Haifa	Petah Tikva
21:00	Tchibota 8'; Sylvestr 38' (pen.); Ashkenazi (yellow card) 64'; Soro (yellow card) 85'	Report	Shua 13'; Habshi (yellow card) 37'; Lavi 43'	Stadium: HaMoshava Stadium; Attendance: 5,500; Referee: Alon Yefet

6 May 2019 33	Maccabi Haifa	3 - 1	Hapoel Be'er Sheva	Haifa
21:00	Rukavytsya 44'; Weissman 45+1', 49'; Menahem (yellow card) 74'	Report	Ogu (yellow card) 20'; Maman 28'	Stadium: Sammy Ofer Stadium; Attendance: 14,237; Referee: Orel Grinfeld

13 May 2019 34	Hapoel Hadera	2 - 0	Maccabi Haifa	Netanya
20:30	Maxim Grechkin 18'; Eden Karzaev 64'	Report	Awaed (red card) 32'	Stadium: Netanya Stadium; Attendance: Roi Reinshreiber; Referee: 4,000

19 May 2019 35	Maccabi Haifa	1 - 1	Maccabi Tel Aviv	Haifa
20:30	Plakuschenko (yellow card) 34'; Neta Lavi (yellow card) 74'; Mandjeck 87'; Shua (yellow card) 89'	Report	Cohen 29'; Glazer (yellow card) 59'; Peretz (yellow card) 70'	Stadium: Sammy Ofer Stadium; Attendance: 16,241; Referee: Erez Papir

25 May 2019 36	Maccabi Netanya	1 - 2	Maccabi Haifa	Netanya
20:00	Mohamed (yellow card) 5'; Heubach 72'	Report	Omri Glazer (yellow card) 30'; Neta Lavi 36'; Mandjeck (yellow card) 42'; Shua 90', (yellow card) 90+1'	Stadium: Netanya Stadium; Attendance: 7,100; Referee: Orel Grinfeld

==== Championship round table ====
Pos	Team	Pld	W	D	L	GF	GA	GD	Pts	Qualification
1	Maccabi Tel Aviv (C)	36	27	8	1	77	17	+60	89	Qualification for the Champions League second qualifying round
2	Maccabi Haifa	36	16	10	10	46	41	+5	58	Qualification for the Europa League first qualifying round
3	Hapoel Be'er Sheva	36	15	10	11	48	46	+2	55	Qualification for the Europa League first qualifying round
4	Maccabi Netanya	36	15	8	13	45	47	−2	53	
5	Bnei Yehuda Tel Aviv	36	14	9	13	56	41	+15	51	Qualification for the Europa League third qualifying round (Note: Bnei Yehuda Tel Aviv qualified for the Europa League third qualifying round by winning the 2018–19 Israel State Cup.)
6	Hapoel Hadera	36	12	6	18	43	59	−16	42	

Source: Israel Football Association, Soccerway
Rules for classification: 1) Points; 2) Goal difference; 3) Matches won; 4) Goals scored; 5) Head-to-head points; 6) Head-to-head goal difference; 7) Head-to-head goals scored; 8) Play-off.
(C) Champions

==== Results overview ====
Win Draw Loss

Opposition	Home score	Away score
Bnei Yehuda Tel Aviv	0-2	2-2
Hapoel Be'er Sheva	3-1	0-1
Hapoel Hadera	1-3	2-0
Maccabi Netanya	2-1	2-1
Maccabi Tel Aviv	1-1	0-1

=== Results summary ===
Overall								Home						Away					
Pld	W	D	L	GF	GA	GD	Pts	W	D	L	GF	GA	GD	W	D	L	GF	GA	GD
36	16	10	10	46	41	+5	58	7	4	7	24	25	−1	9	6	3	22	16	+6

Last updated: 26 May 2019.
Source: Competitive matches

=== Results by round ===
Round	1	2	3	4	5	6	7	8	9	10	11	12	13	14	15	16	17	18	19	20	21	22	23	24	25	26	27	28	29	30	31	32	33	34	35	36
Ground	A	H	A	H	H	A	H	A	H	A	H	A	H	H	A	H	A	A	H	A	H	A	H	A	H	A	H	A	H	H	A	A	H	A	H	A
Result	L	W	D	L	D	D	L	W	L	W	L	W	D	L	W	W	W	W	D	D	W	D	W	D	W	W	L	L	L	W	W	D	W	L	D	W
Position	12	6	6	9	9	10	12	8	9	8	10	6	10	10	7	6	5	4	3	3	2	3	3	3	3	2	2	4	3	3	2	2	2	2	3	2

Updated to match(es) played on 26 May 2019. Source: Competitive Matches
A = Away; H = Home; W = Win; D = Draw; L = Loss

== State Cup ==
=== Round of 32 ===
22 December 2018 Round of 32	Maccabi Haifa	5 - 0	Hapoel Marmorek	Haifa
17:30	Menahem (yellow card) 1'; Sallalich 3'; Weissman 24'; Awaed 33'; Azulay 38', 51'; Gershon (yellow card) 61'; Lavi (yellow card) 84'	Report	Ayman Ali (yellow card) 49'	Stadium: Sammy Ofer Stadium; Attendance: 3,150; Referee: David Foxman

=== Round of 16 ===
22 January 2019 Round of 16	Bnei Sakhnin	1 - 0	Maccabi Haifa	Sakhnin
20:30	Azulay 32'; Ihab Ganayem (yellow card) 42'	Report	Mabouka (yellow card) 63'; Shua (yellow card) 90+3'; Menahem (yellow card) 90+5'	Stadium: Doha Stadium; Attendance: 3,500; Referee: Ziv Adler

== Toto Cup ==
=== Group stage ===
Pos	Team	Pld	W	D	L	GF	GA	GD	Pts	Qualification or relegation
1	Maccabi Haifa (Q)	4	2	2	0	9	4	+5	8	Semi-finals
2	Maccabi Netanya	4	2	2	0	8	5	+3	8	5-8th classification play-offs
3	Bnei Sakhnin	4	1	3	0	3	2	+1	6	9-10th classification play-offs
4	Hapoel Kiryat Shmona	4	1	0	3	5	7	−2	3	11-12th classification play-offs
5	Hapoel Hadera	4	0	1	3	2	9	−7	1	13-14th classification play-offs

Updated to match(es) played on unknown. Source: Israel Football Association
Rules for classification: 1) points; 2) goal difference; 3) number of wins; 4) goals scored; 5) head to head; 6)deciding match.
(Q) Qualified for the phase indicated

28 July 2018 1	Maccabi Haifa	1 – 1	Maccabi Netanya	Haifa
19:00	Habshi (yellow card) 8'; Mizrahi (yellow card) 29'; Rukavytsya 78'	Report	Kougbenya (penalty missed) 8 Heubach (yellow card) 29'; Kahlon (yellow card) 63'; Levy 90+3'	Stadium: Sammy Ofer Stadium; Attendance: 9,126; Referee: Roi Reinshreiber

31 July 2018 2	Bnei Sakhnin	1 – 1	Maccabi Haifa	Sakhnin
21:00	Azulay 11'; Ihab Ganayem (yellow card) 67'	Report	Lavi 8'	Stadium: Doha Stadium; Attendance: 350; Referee: Igal Frid

4 August 2018 3	Maccabi Haifa	3 – 2	Hapoel Kiryat Shmona	Haifa
21:00	Kramer (yellow card) 13', (goal) 20'; Rukavytsya 54'; Mizrahi (yellow card) 60'; Arad 84'	Report	Hasselbaink 38' (pen.), 48'; Samuel Brown (yellow card) 52'; García (yellow card) 73'; Abu Abaid (yellow card) 78'	Stadium: Sammy Ofer Stadium; Attendance: 7,327; Referee: Erez Papir

7 August 2018 4	Hapoel Hadera	0 – 4	Maccabi Haifa	Netanya
21:00	Menashe Zalka (yellow card) 33'; Sam Warnen (yellow card) 64'	Report	Rukavytsya 19'; Azulay (yellow card) 36', (goal) 83'; Weissman (yellow card) 42', (goal) 90'; Allyson dos Santos 51'; Habshi (yellow card) 62'	Stadium: Netanya Stadium; Attendance: 1,200; Referee: David Foxman

==== Semi-final ====
20 August 2018 Semi-Final	Hapoel Haifa	1 – 1 (2 – 3 p)	Maccabi Haifa	Haifa
21:00	Guy Hadida (yellow card) 21'; Papazoglou (red card) 76'; Zamir 82'	Report	Mizrahi (yellow card) 51' dos Santos (yellow card) 68'; Rukavytsya 73'; Haimov (yellow card)	Stadium: Sammy Ofer Stadium; Attendance: 10,600; Referee: Erez Papir
	Penalties
	Tamaș (penalty scored); Kapiloto (penalty scored); Maxim Plakuschenko (penalty missed); Zamir (penalty missed); Malul (penalty missed)		Alberman (penalty scored); Rukavytsya (penalty missed); Mandjeck (penalty missed); Habshi (penalty scored); Kramer (penalty scored)

==== Final ====
26 September 2018 Final	Maccabi Haifa	1 - 2	Maccabi Tel Aviv	Petah Tikva
20:45	Menahem (yellow card) 35'; Awaed 42'; Allyson dos Santos (yellow card) 90'	Report	Atzili 32'; Dan Glazer (yellow card) 72'; Atar 85'; Golasa (yellow card) 90'	Stadium: HaMoshava Stadium; Attendance: 10,800; Referee: Gal Leibovich

== Statistics ==
=== Squad statistics ===
Updated on 27 May 2019

			Ligat Ha'Al					State Cup					Toto Cup					Total				
Nation	No.	Name		GS	Min.	Goal	Assist		GS	Min.	Goal	Assist		GS	Min.	Goal	Assist		GS	Min.	Goal	Assist
Goalkeepers
(Israel)	22	Gil Ofek	1	1	94	0	0	0	0	0	0	0	0	0	0	0	0	1	1	94	0	0
(Israel)	55	Omri Glazer	3	2	245	0	0	0	0	0	0	0	2	2	192	0	0	5	4	437	0	0
(Israel)	77	Guy Haimov	33	33	3,112	0	0	2	2	190	0	0	2	2	192	0	0	37	37	3,494	0	0
Defenders
(Brazil)	2	Allyson dos Santos	15	12	1,045	0	0	1	1	51	0	0	6	6	578	1	0	22	19	1,674	1	0
(Netherlands)	4	Etiënne Reijnen	25	22	2,110	0	0	2	2	190	0	0	2	2	192	0	0	29	26	2,492	0	0
(Israel)	5	Rami Gershon	12	9	887	0	0	1	1	90	0	0	4	3	289	0	0	17	13	1,266	0	0
(Israel)	12	Sun Menahem	22	16	1,450	1	0	2	1	120	0	0	4	1	150	0	1	28	18	1,720	1	1
(Israel)	15	Ofri Arad	21	20	1,921	0	1	1	1	100	0	0	2	0	37	1	0	24	21	2,058	1	1
(Israel)	21	Ayid Habshi	31	30	2,729	0	1	1	1	100	0	0	4	4	362	0	0	36	35	3,191	0	1
(Israel)	25	Raz Meir	22	20	1,878	2	2	2	2	190	0	1	2	2	122	0	0	26	24	2,160	2	3
(Cameroon)	26	Ernest Mabouka	34	34	3,133	0	6	1	1	71	0	0	6	6	578	0	0	41	41	3,782	0	6
Midfielders
(Israel)	6	Gal Alberman	2	0	49	0	0	0	0	0	0	0	5	0	85	0	0	7	0	134	0	0
(Israel)	7	Sintayehu Sallalich	19	14	1,250	2	2	2	2	153	1	1	5	3	233	0	0	26	19	1,636	3	4
(Turkey)	10	Kerim Frei	16	14	1,398	1	3	0	0	0	0	0	0	0	0	0	0	16	14	1,398	1	3
(Cameroon)	14	Georges Mandjeck	31	30	2,687	5	1	0	0	0	0	0	4	2	310	0	0	35	32	2,997	5	1
(Israel)	16	Mohammad Abu Fani	8	4	425	1	0	0	0	0	0	0	0	0	0	0	0	8	4	425	1	0
(Israel)	19	Roi Kahat	8	2	340	0	1	1	1	90	0	0	1	1	58	0	0	10	4	488	0	1
(Israel)	28	Maxim Plakuschenko	16	5	833	0	1	0	0	0	0	0	0	0	0	0	0	16	5	833	0	1
(Israel)	31	Neta Lavi	34	32	3,012	3	1	1	1	90	0	0	5	4	339	1	0	40	37	3,441	4	1
Forwards
(Israel)	9	Mohammed Awaed	27	20	1,876	7	4	2	1	105	1	0	6	5	433	1	5	35	26	2,414	9	9
(Israel)	11	Yarden Shua	15	8	899	3	3	1	1	100	0	0	0	0	0	0	0	16	9	999	3	3
(Australia) (Israel)	13	Nikita Rukavytsya	35	33	2,597	9	3	2	1	117	0	0	6	5	436	4	2	43	39	3,150	13	5
(Israel)	27	Shon Weissman	25	13	1,440	8	3	1	1	73	1	0	5	2	161	1	0	31	15	1,674	10	7
Players who no longer play for Maccabi Haifa
(Israel)	1	Ohad Levita	0	0	0	0	0	0	0	0	0	0	2	2	194	0	0	2	2	194	0	0
(Chile)	8	Manuel Iturra	2	1	63	0	0	0	0	0	0	0	0	0	0	0	0	2	1	63	0	0
(Israel)	8	Ofir Mizrahi	7	2	206	1	0	1	0	28	0	0	4	4	316	0	0	12	7	550	0	1
(Israel)	10	Shlomi Azulay	17	12	1,212	1	2	2	2	162	2	0	5	5	421	1	1	24	21	1,795	4	3
(Israel)	17	Amit Zenati	10	0	218	0	0	1	0	35	0	0	1	0	34	0	0	12	0	287	0	0
(Guinea)	18	Seydouba Soumah	6	2	171	0	1	1	0	38	0	0	0	0	0	0	0	7	2	209	0	1
(Israel)	23	Omri Ben Harush	0	0	0	0	0	0	0	0	0	0	1	0	15	0	0	1	0	15	0	0
(Netherlands)	29	Michiel Kramer	4	4	321	0	0	0	0	0	0	0	5	5	460	1	0	9	9	781	1	0
(Israel)	40	Yonatan Levi	0	0	0	0	0	0	0	0	0	0	2	0	31	0	0	2	0	31	0	0

=== Goals ===
Updated on 27 May 2019

Rank	Player	Position	Ligat Ha'Al	State Cup	Toto Cup	Total
1	(Australia) Nikita Rukavytsya	FW	9	0	4	13
2	(Israel) Shon Weissman	FW	8	1	1	10
3	(Israel) Mohammed Awaed	FW	7	1	1	9
4	(Cameroon) Georges Mandjeck	MF	5	0	0	5
5	(Israel) Neta Lavi	MF	3	0	1	4
6	(Israel) Sintayehu Sallalich	MF	2	0	1	3
6	(Israel) Yarden Shua	FW	3	0	0	3
7	(Israel) Raz Meir	DF	2	0	0	2
8	(Israel) Sun Menahem	DF	1	0	0	1
8	(Turkey) Kerim Frei	MF	1	0	0	1
8	(Israel) Mohammad Abu Fani	MF	1	0	0	1
8	(Israel) Ofri Arad	DF	0	0	1	1
8	(Brazil) Allyson dos Santos	DF	0	0	1	1
9	Own goals		2	0	0	2
Players who no longer play for Maccabi Haifa
10
10	(Israel) Shlomi Azulay	MF	2	2	1	5
10	(Netherlands) Michiel Kramer	FW	0	0	1	1

=== Assists ===
Updated on 20 May 2019

Rank	Player	Position	Ligat Ha'Al	State Cup	Toto Cup	Total
1	(Israel) Mohammed Awaed	FW	4	0	5	9
2	(Cameroon) Ernest Mabouka	DF	6	0	0	6
3	(Australia) (Israel) Nikita Rukavytsya	FW	3	0	2	5
4	(Israel) Sintayehu Sallalich	MF	2	1	1	4
5	(Israel) Shon Weissman	FW	3	0	0	3
5	(Israel) Yarden Shua	FW	3	0	0	3
5	(Israel) Raz Meir	DF	2	1	0	3
5	(Turkey) Kerim Frei	MF	3	0	0	3
6	(Cameroon) Georges Mandjeck	MF	1	0	0	1
6	(Israel) Neta Lavi	MF	1	0	0	1
6	(Israel) Ayid Habshi	DF	1	0	0	1
6	(Israel) Maxim Plakuschenko	DF	1	0	0	1
6	(Israel) Ofri Arad	MF	1	0	0	1
6	(Israel) Roi Kahat	MF	0	0	1	1
6	(Israel) Sun Menahem	DF	0	0	1	1
Players who no longer play for Maccabi Haifa
7	(Israel) Shlomi Azulay	MF	2	0	1	3
7	(Guinea) Seydouba Soumah	MF	1	0	0	1
7	(Israel) Ofir Mizrahi	MF	1	0	0	1
7	(Israel) Amit Zenati	FW	1	0	0	1

=== Clean sheets ===
Updated on 23 April 2019

Rank	Pos.	No.	Name	Ligat Ha'Al	State Cup	Toto Cup	Total
1	GK	77	(Israel) Guy Haimov	10	1		11
2	GK	22	(Israel) Gil Ofek	1			1
2	GK	55	(Israel) Omri Glazer			1	1

=== Disciplinary record (Ligat Ha'Al and State Cup) ===
Updated on 27 May 2019

No.	Pos	Nat	Name	Ligat Ha'Al			State Cup			Total		
No.	Pos	Nat	Name	Booked	(yellow card) (yellow-red card)	Sent off (straight red)	Booked	(yellow card) (yellow-red card)	Sent off (straight red)	Booked	(yellow card) (yellow-red card)	Sent off (straight red)
14	MF	(Cameroon)	Georges Mandjeck	11	1					11	1	
31	MF	(Israel)	Neta Lavi	10						10		
11	FW	(Israel)	Yarden Shua	9			1			10		
21	DF	(Israel)	Ayid Habshi	7			1			8		
12	DF	(Israel)	Sun Menahem	6		1	1			7		1
26	DF	(Cameroon)	Ernest Mabouka	5		1	1			6		1
9	FW	(Israel)	Mohammed Awaed	6		1				6		1
16	MF	(Israel)	Mohammad Abu Fani	5	1					6		
77	GK	(Israel)	Guy Haimov	5						5		
27	FW	(Israel)	Shon Weissman	4						4		
28	MF	(Israel)	Maxim Plakuschenko	5						5		
25	DF	(Israel)	Raz Meir	3						3		
10	MF	(Turkey)	Kerim Frei	3						3		
2	DF	(Brazil)	Allyson dos Santos	1						1		
5	DF	(Israel)	Rami Gershon	1						1		
32	MF	(Israel)	Timothy Muzie	1						1		
5	DF	(Israel)	Rami Gershon	1						1		
4	DF	(Netherlands)	Etiënne Reijnen			2						2
55	GK	(Israel)	Omri Glazer	1						1		
Players who no longer play for Maccabi Haifa
10	MF	(Israel)	Shlomi Azulay	6						6		
29	FW	(Netherlands)	Michiel Kramer	1		1				1	1	
17	FW	(Israel)	Amit Zenati		1						1	

=== Disciplinary record (Toto Cup) ===
Updated on 27 August 2018

No.	Pos	Nat	Name	Toto Cup		
No.	Pos	Nat	Name	Booked	(yellow card) (yellow-red card)	Sent off (straight red)
8	FW	(Israel)	Ofir Mizrahi	3		
21	DF	(Israel)	Ayid Habshi	2		
2	DF	(Brazil)	Allyson dos Santos	2		
29	FW	(Netherlands)	Michiel Kramer	1		
10	MF	(Israel)	Shlomi Azulay	1		
27	FW	(Israel)	Shon Weissman	1		
77	GK	(Israel)	Guy Haimov	1		
12	DF	(Israel)	Sun Menahem	1		

=== Suspensions ===
Updated on 20 March 2019

Player	Date Received	Offence	Length of suspension		
Amit Zenati	13 May 2018	(yellow card) 90' (yellow-red card) 91' vs Hapoel Ra'anana (H) (2017–18 season)	2 Matches	Maccabi Netanya (H); Bnei Sakhnin (A)	28 July 2018; 31 July 2018
Ofir Mizrahi	20 August 2018	(yellow card) 51' vs Hapoel Haifa (A)	1 Match	Maccabi Tel Aviv (N) (2018–19 Toto Cup)	26 September 2018
Michiel Kramer	26 August 2018	(red card) 68' vs Maccabi Tel Aviv (A)	3 Matches	F.C. Ashdod (H); Bnei Yehuda Tel Aviv (A); Maccabi Petah Tikva (H)	1 September 2018; 15 September 2018; 22 September 2018
Amit Zenati	22 September 2018	(yellow card) 76' (yellow-red card) 82' vs Maccabi Petah Tikva (H)	1 Match	Maccabi Tel Aviv (N) (2018–19 Toto Cup)	26 September 2018
Etiënne Reijnen	22 October 2018	(red card) 50' vs Maccabi Netanya (H)	1 Match	Hapoel Tel Aviv (A)	29 October 2018
Sun Menahem	22 October 2018	(red card) 90' vs Maccabi Netanya (H)	2 Matches	Hapoel Tel Aviv (A); Beitar Jerusalem (H)	29 October 2018; 5 November 2018
Shlomi Azulay	29 September 2018	(yellow card) 73' vs Hapoel Tel Aviv (A)	1 Match	Hapoel Hadera (A)	10 November 2018
Georges Mandjeck	10 November 2018	(yellow card) 75' vs Hapoel Hadera (A)	1 Match	Bnei Sakhnin (A)	4 December 2018
Mohammed Awaed	17 December 2018	(yellow card) 70' vs Maccabi Tel Aviv (H)	1 Match	F.C. Ashdod (A)	27 December 2018
Sun Menahem	26 December 2018	(yellow card) 90+5' vs F.C. Ashdod (A)	1 Match	Maccabi Petah Tikva (A)	5 January 2019
Yarden Shua	6 January 2019	(yellow card) 37' vs Hapoel Be'er Sheva (H)	1 Match	Hapoel Ra'anana (H)	19 January 2019
Neta Lavi	12 January 2019	(yellow card) 71' vs Hapoel Be'er Sheva (A)	1 Match	Bnei Sakhnin (A)	22 January 2019
Ayid Habshi	27 January 2019	(yellow card) 46' vs Maccabi Netanya (A)	1 Match	Beitar Jerusalem (A)	10 February 2019
Georges Mandjeck	10 February 2019	(yellow card) 28' (yellow-red card) 37' vs Beitar Jerusalem (A)	1 Match	Hapoel Hadera (H)	17 February 2019
Guy Haimov	10 February 2019	(yellow card) 37' vs Beitar Jerusalem (A)	1 Match	Hapoel Haifa (A)	25 February 2019
Ernest Mabouka	10 February 2019	(yellow card) 87' vs Beitar Jerusalem (A)	1 Match	Hapoel Haifa (A)	25 February 2019
Mohammad Abu Fani	25 February 2019	(yellow card) 55' vs Hapoel Haifa (A)	1 Match	Ironi Kiryat Shmona (A)	9–11 March 2019
Georges Mandjeck	2 March	(yellow card) 82' vs Bnei Sakhnin (H)	1 Match	Bnei Yehuda Tel Aviv (H)	16–18 March 2019
Ernest Mabouka	16 March 2019	(red card) 45' vs Bnei Yehuda Tel Aviv (H)	1 Match	Maccabi Tel Aviv (A)	30 March 2019
Etiënne Reijnen	22 April 2019	(red card) 30' vs Hapoel Be'er Sheva (A)	2 Matches	Bnei Yehuda Tel Aviv (A); Hapoel Be'er Sheva (H)	29 April 2019; 6 May 2019
Neta Lavi	22 April 2019	(yellow card) 61' vs Hapoel Be'er Sheva (A)	1 Match	Bnei Sakhnin (A)	22 January 20
Mohammed Awaed	16 March 2019	(red card) 45' vs Hapoel Hadera (A)	3 Match	Maccabi Tel Aviv (H); Maccabi Netanya (A) ?	19 May 2019; 25 May 2019 ?
Maxim Plakuschenko	19 March 2019	(yellow card) 34' vs Maccabi Tel Aviv (H)	1 Match	?	?
Yarden Shua	19 March 2019	(yellow card) 89' vs Maccabi Tel Aviv (H)	1 Match	?	?

=== Penalties ===
Updated on 3 March 2019

Date	Penalty Taker	Scored	Opponent	Competition
1 December 2018	Nikita Rukavytsya	No	Hapoel Haifa	Ligat Ha'Al
2 March 2019	Nikita Rukavytsya	No	Bnei Sakhnin	Ligat Ha'Al

=== Overall ===
	Total	Home	Away	Natural
Games played	43	21	22	1
Games won	19	9	10	-
Games drawn	12	4	8	-
Games lost	12	7	4	1
Biggest win	5-0 vs Hapoel Marmorek	5-0 vs Hapoel Marmorek	4-0 vs Hapoel Hadera	-
Biggest loss	0-2 vs Maccabi Tel Aviv; 0-2 vs Maccabi Netanya; 1-3 vs Hapoel Haifa; 1-3 vs Maccabi Tel Aviv; 0-2 Bnei Yehuda Tel Aviv; 1-3 Hapoel Hadera; 0-2 Hapoel Hadera	0-2 vs Maccabi Netanya; 1-3 vs Hapoel Haifa; 1-3 vs Maccabi Tel Aviv; 0-2 Bnei Yehuda Tel Aviv; 1-3 Hapoel Hadera	0-2 vs Maccabi Tel Aviv; 0-2 Hapoel Hadera	1-2 vs Maccabi Tel Aviv
Biggest win (League)	2-0 vs F.C. Ashdod; 2-0 vs Bnei Sakhnin; 2-0 vs Hapoel Be'er Sheva; 3-1 vs Hapoel Hadera; 2-0 vs Bnei Sakhnin; 3-1 vs Hapoel Be'er Sheva	2-0 vs F.C. Ashdod; 3-1 vs Hapoel Hadera; 2-0 vs Bnei Sakhnin; 3-1 vs Hapoel Be'er Sheva	2-0 vs Bnei Sakhnin; 2-0 Hapoel Be'er Sheva	-
Biggest loss (League)	0-2 vs Maccabi Tel Aviv; 0-2 vs Maccabi Netanya; 1-3 vs Hapoel Haifa; 1-3 vs Maccabi Tel Aviv; 0-2 Bnei Yehuda Tel Aviv; 1-3 Hapoel Hadera; 0-2 Hapoel Hadera	0-2 vs Maccabi Netanya; 1-3 vs Hapoel Haifa; 1-3 vs Maccabi Tel Aviv; 0-2 Bnei Yehuda Tel Aviv; 1-3 Hapoel Hadera	0-2 vs Maccabi Tel Aviv; 0-2 Hapoel Hadera	-
Biggest win (Cup)	5-0 vs Hapoel Marmorek	5-0 vs Hapoel Marmorek	-	-
Biggest loss (Cup)	0-1 vs Bnei Sakhnin	-	0-1 vs Bnei Sakhnin	-
Biggest win (Toto)	4-0 vs Hapoel Hadera	3-2 vs Hapoel Ironi Kiryat Shmona	4-0 vs Hapoel Hadera	-
Biggest loss (Toto)	1-2 vs Maccabi Tel Aviv	-	-	1-2 vs Maccabi Tel Aviv
Goals scored	61	32	28	1
Goals conceded	48	27	19	2
Goal difference	+13	+5	+9	-1
Clean sheets	11	5	6	-
Average GF per game	1.42	1.6	1.27	1
Average GA per game	1.12	1.35	86.36	2
Yellow cards	91	38	51	2
Red cards	7	3	4	-
Most appearances				
Most minutes played				
Most goals	(Australia) (Israel) Nikita Rukavytsya (13)			
Most Assist	(Israel) Mohammed Awaed (9)			
Penalties for	2	2	-	-
Penalties against	5	2	3	-
Winning rate	41.86%	45%	4.5%	0%

Last updated: Updated on 27 May 2019
Source: Competitive matches
