= 2017 Israel Super Cup =

Hapoel Be'er Sheva	Bnei Yehuda Tel Aviv
4	2
- Date: 10 August 2017
- Venue: Netanya Stadium, Netanya
- Attendance: 6,350

The 2017 Israel Super Cup is the 22nd Israel Super Cup (27th, including unofficial matches, as the competition wasn't played within the Israel Football Association in its first 5 editions, until 1969), an annual Israel football match played between the winners of the previous season's Top Division and Israel State Cup. This is the second time since 1990 that the match was staged, after a planned resumption of the cup was cancelled in 2014.

The game was played between Hapoel Be'er Sheva, champions of the 2016–17 Israeli Premier League and Bnei Yehuda Tel Aviv, winners of the 2016-17 Israeli State Cup. As it has ended with the score of 4-2 to Hapoel Be'er Sheva after draw 1-1 in the half time.

== Match details ==
10 August 2017

Hapoel Be'er Sheva	4–2	Bnei Yehuda Tel Aviv
Ghadir 20'; Pekhart 57'; Taha 74'; Nwakaeme 79'	Report	Buzaglo 53' (pen.); Kandil 67'

Netanya, Netanya
Attendance: 6,350
Referee: Roi Reinshreiber

Hapoel Be'er Sheva	Bnei Yehuda

GK	1	(Israel) Dudu Goresh
RB	2	(Israel) Ben Bitton
CB	20	(Portugal) Miguel Vitor (substituted off) 63'
CB	5	(Israel) Shir Tzedek (yellow card) 16'
LB	69	(Hungary) Mihály Korhut (yellow card) 44'
DM	30	(Nigeria) John Ogu (yellow card) 50'
CM	11	(Israel) Dan Einbinder (substituted off) 36'
LM	24	(Israel) Maor Melikson (c)
RW	9	(Nigeria) Anthony Nwakaeme (substituted off) 81' (goal) 79'
CF	8	(Israel) Mohammad Ghadir 20' (yellow card) 26' (substituted off) 68'
FW	99	(Czech Republic) Tomáš Pekhart 57' (substituted off) 58'
Substitutes:
GK	55	(Israel) Guy Haimov
DF	20	(Israel) Loai Taha (substituted in) 63' (goal) 74'
MF	81	(Israel) Dor Elo
MF	18	(Israel) Michael Ohana (substituted in) 58'
MF	16	(Israel) Vladimir Brown (substituted in) 81'
MF	7	(Israel) Maharan Radi (substituted in) 36'
FW	10	(Israel) Elyaniv Barda (substituted in) 58'
Manager:
(Israel) Barak Bakhar

GK	1	(Lithuania) Emilijus Zubas
RB	23	(Israel) Maor Kandil 67'
CB	17	(Israel) Itzik Azuz (c)
CB	4	(Israel) Paz Ben Ari (substituted off) 79'
CB	5	(Israel) Ayid Habshi
LB	3	(Israel) Ben Turjeman
CM	10	(Israel) Roei Gordana (substituted off) 83'
CM	28	(Israel) Stav Finish
RW	28	(Israel) Almog Buzaglo (yellow card) 31' (goal) 53' (substituted off) 79'
CF	21	(Lithuania) Nerijus Valskis (substituted off) 79'
CF	13	(Republic of the Congo) Mavis Tchibota (substituted off) 89'
Substitutes:
GK	22	(Israel) Itamar Israeli
DF	15	(Israel) Eli Balilty (substituted in) 79'
DF	7	(Israel) Shay Konstantini (substituted in) 89'
MF	6	(Israel) Yuval Ashkenazi (substituted in) 83'
MF	11	(Israel) Daniel Avital
MF	8	(Israel) Matan Hozez (substituted in) 79'
FW	16	(Israel) Dovev Gabay (substituted in) 79'
Manager:
(Israel) Yossi Abuksis

Man of the Match:

MATCH OFFICIALS

- Assistant referees:
- Fourth official:
- Additional assistant referees:

Match rules

- 90 minutes.
- Penalty shoot-out if scores level.
- Seven named substitutes, of which up to three may be used.
