= 2016 Israel State Cup final =

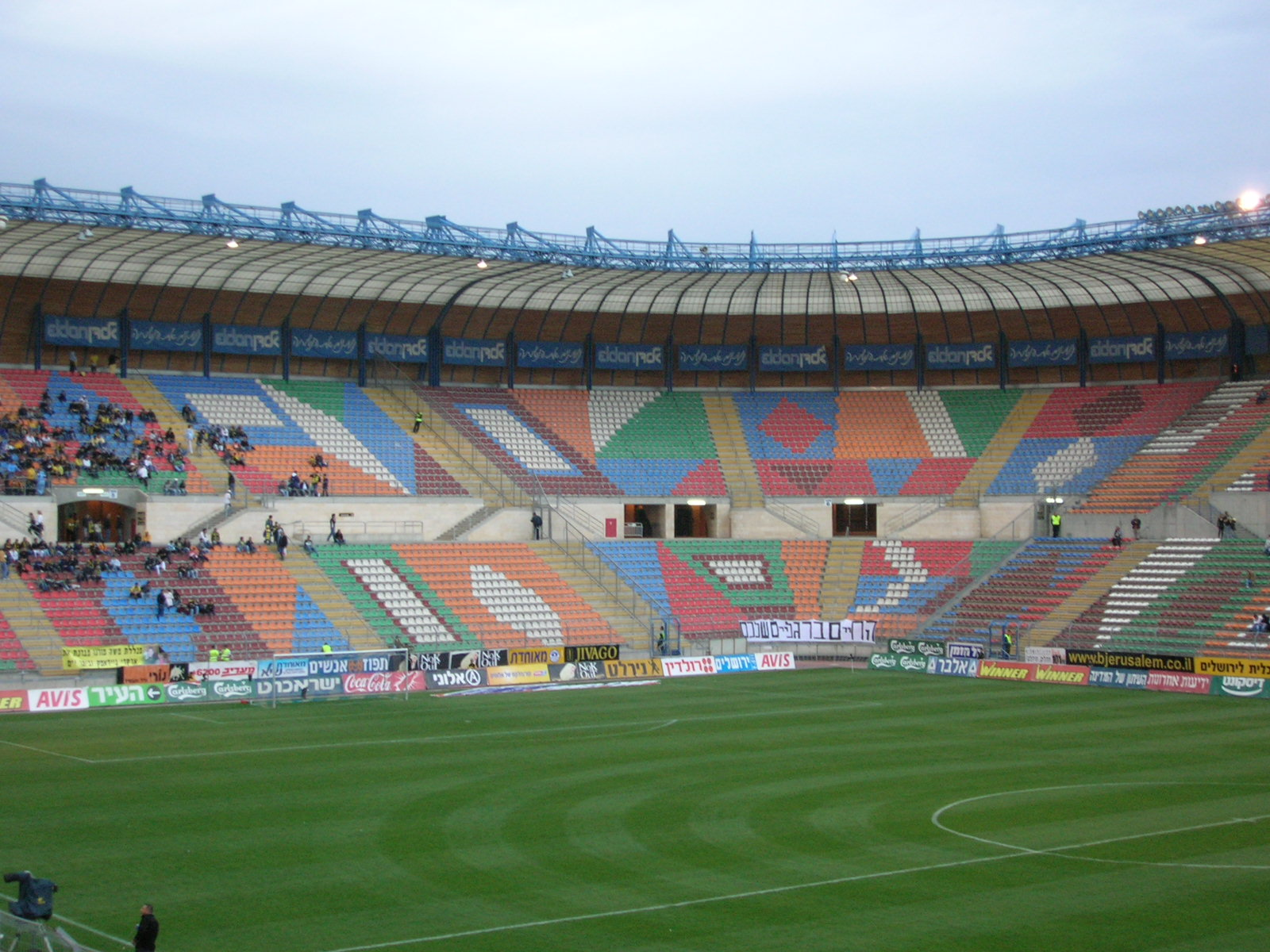
- Teddy Stadium in Jerusalem hosted the final
- Event: 2015–16 Israel State Cup
| Maccabi Tel Aviv | Maccabi Haifa |
| 0 | 1 |
- Date: 24 May 2016
- Venue: Teddy, Jerusalem
- Attendance: 30,000

The 2016 Israel State Cup final decided the winner of the 2015–16 Israel State Cup, the 81st season of Israel's main football cup. It was played on May 24, 2016 at the Teddy Stadium in Jerusalem, between Maccabi Tel Aviv and Maccabi Haifa.

== Background ==
Maccabi Tel Aviv had previously played 34 Israel Cup Finals, had won the competition a record 23 times. Their most recent appearance in the final was the previous year's edition, in which they won 6–2 over Hapoel Beer Sheva at Sammy Ofer in Haifa.

Maccabi Haifa had previously played in 15 finals, winning five. Their most recent appearance in the final was the previous year's edition, in which they lost 2–1 to Hapoel Tel Aviv, and their most recent victory in the tournament was in 1998, beating Hapoel Jerusalem 2–0.

Maccabi Tel Aviv and Maccabi Haifa had played each other in four previous finals of the tournament. Maccabi Tel Aviv won in 2002 and 1987, and Maccabi Haifa won in 1962 and 1993.

The two teams played each other four times during the 2015–16 Israeli Premier League season. In the first instance, at Sammy Ofer Stadium on 26 September 2015, Tel Aviv won 2–0, Eden Ben Basat and Dor Peretz scoring. On 10 January 2016 at Bloomfield Stadium, Maccabi Tel Aviv won 2–1. Eran Zahavi and Tal Ben Haim gave them a 2–0 half-time lead. Yossi Benayoun shrinking down 2–1. On 17 April 2016 at Sammy Ofer Stadium the game end drew 0–0. The fourth match between the two teams was held in Bloomfield Stadium on 21 May 2016.

== Road to the final ==
| Maccabi Tel Aviv | | Round | Maccabi Haifa |
|---|---|---|---|---|
| Opponent | Result | 2015–16 Israel State Cup | Opponent | Result |
| Hapoel Ramat HaSahron | 3–1 | Eighth round | Beitar Jerusalem | 2–1 |
| Hapoel Rishon LeZion | 2–1 | Round of 16 | Hapoel Haifa | 1–0 |
| Hapoel Kfar Saba | 3–0 | Quarter-finals first leg | Bnei Yehuda Tel Aviv | 2-2 |
| Hapoel Kfar Saba | 2–0 | Quarter-finals second leg | Bnei Yehuda Tel Aviv | 4-1 |
| Bnei Sakhnin F.C. | 3–2 | Semi-finals | Hapoel Be'er Sheva | 3–1 |

=== Details ===
24 May 2016
20:50 CEST

| Maccabi Tel Aviv | 0–1 | Maccabi Haifa |
|---|---|---|
| | | Obraniak 36' |

Teddy Stadium, Jerusalem
Referee: Roi Reinshreiber

| Maccabi Tel Aviv | Maccabi Haifa |

| GK | 95 | (Serbia) Predrag Rajković |
| RB | 2 | (Israel) Eli Dasa |
| CB | 18 | (Israel) Eitan Tibi |
| CB | 24 | (Spain) Carlos García (substituted off) 83' |
| LB | 22 | (Israel) Avi Rikan |
| DM | 4 | (Bosnia and Herzegovina) Haris Medunjanin (yellow card) 90' |
| CM | 6 | (Israel) Gal Alberman (substituted off) 71' |
| LM | 40 | (Nigeria) Nosa Igiebor (substituted off) 76' |
| CF | 7 | (Israel) Eran Zahavi (c) |
| RW | 15 | (Israel) Dor Micha (yellow card) 32' |
| CF | 11 | (Israel) Tal Ben Haim |
Substitutes:
| GK | 1 | (Israel) Daniel Lifshitz |
| DF | 14 | (Israel) Yoav Ziv |
| MF | 42 | (Israel) Dor Peretz |
| MF | 16 | (Israel) Shlomi Azulay |
| FW | 10 | (Israel) Barak Itzhaki (substituted on) 76' |
| MF | 45 | (Israel) Eliel Peretz (substituted on) 71' |
| FW | 9 | (Israel) Eden Ben Basat (substituted on) 83' |
Manager:
(Netherlands) Peter Bosz

| GK | 38 | (Serbia) Vladimir Stojković |
| RB | 27 | (Israel) Eyal Meshumar |
| CB | 4 | (Spain) Marc Valiente |
| CB | 21 | (Israel) Dekel Keinan (yellow card) 46' |
| LB | 13 | (Israel) Taleb Tawatha |
| DM | 10 | (Poland) Ludovic Obraniak 36' (yellow card) 56' |
| CM | 31 | (Israel) Neta Lavi |
| CM | 51 | (Brazil) Romário Pires (yellow card) 90' |
| RW | 15 | (Israel) Yossi Benayoun (c) (substituted off) 79' |
| LW | 8 | (Israel) Hen Ezra (substituted off) 86' |
| CF | 17 | (Israel) Shoval Gozlan (substituted off) 68' |
Substitutes:
| GK | 1 | (Israel) Ohad Levita |
| DF | 2 | (Israel) Ayid Habshi |
| DF | 25 | (Israel) Sun Menahem |
| MF | 14 | (Israel) Gil Vermouth |
| MF | 7 | (Israel) Ofir Kriaf (substituted on) 86' |
| FW | 19 | (Israel) Shahar Hirsh (substituted on) 68' |
| FW | 11 | (Israel) Ismaeel Ryan (substituted on) 79' (yellow card) 87' |
Manager:
(Israel) Ronny Levy
