= Dan Einbinder =

Israeli footballer (born 1989)

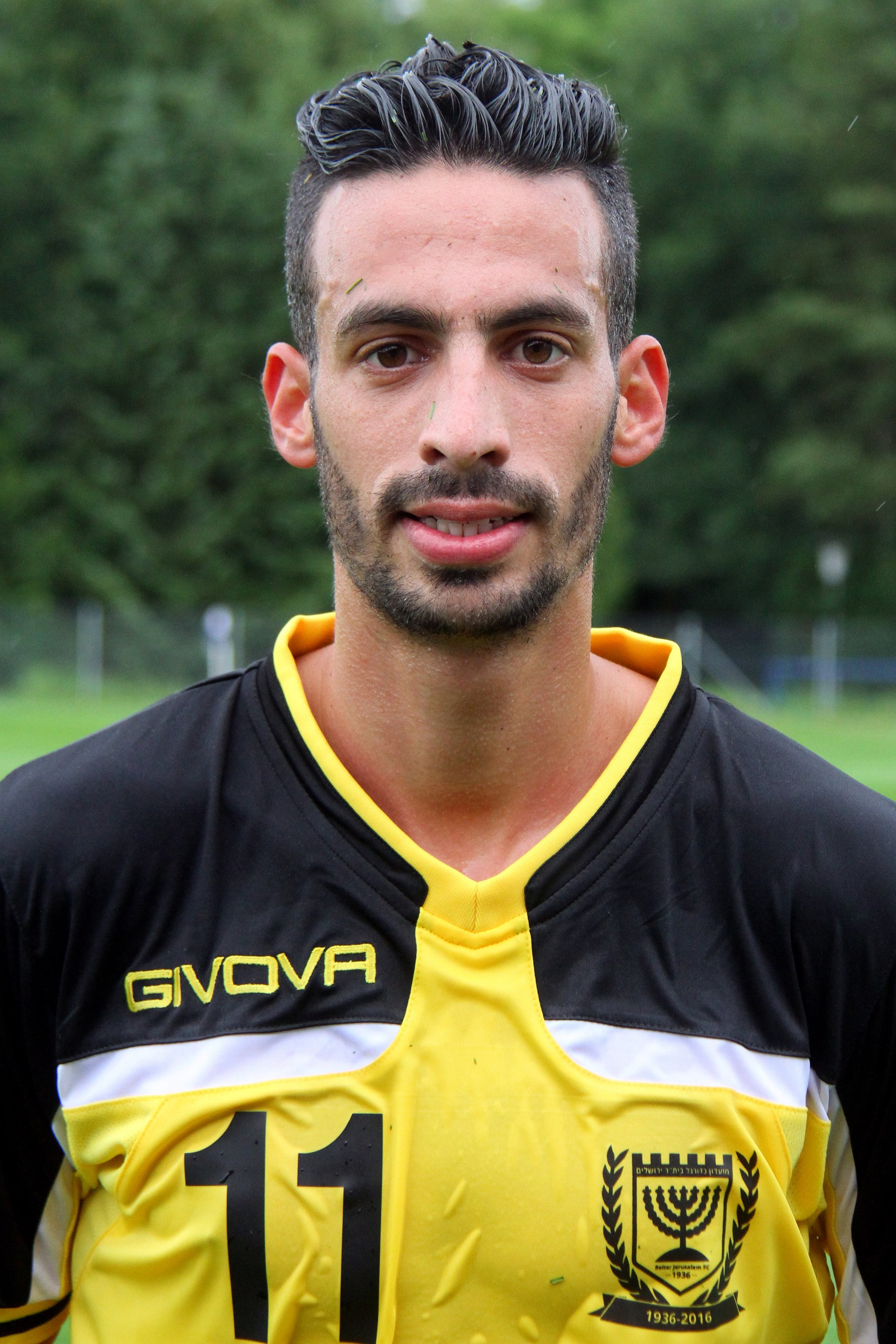
- Einbinder with Beitar Jerusalem in 2016

Personal information
- Full name: Dan Einbinder
- Date of birth: 16 February 1989 (age 37)
- Place of birth: Mevaseret Zion, Israel
- Height: 1.85 m (6 ft 1 in)
- Position: Midfielder

Youth career
- 1998–2008: Beitar Jerusalem

Senior career*
Years	Team	Apps	(Gls)
2008–2012	Beitar Jerusalem	62	(5)
2012–2013	Ironi Kiryat Shmona	29	(2)
2013–2015	Maccabi Tel Aviv	36	(1)
2015–2017	Beitar Jerusalem	62	(6)
2017–2018	Hapoel Be'er Sheva	32	(3)
2018–2021	Beitar Jerusalem	58	(5)
2021–2024	Hapoel Tel Aviv	110	(11)
2024–2025	Hapoel Hadera	23	(4)
Total		412	(37)

International career
2007	Israel U18	2	(0)
2007–2008	Israel U19	5	(0)
2016–2017	Israel	3	(1)
- * Club domestic league appearances and goals as of 1 June 2025

Dan Einbinder (Hebrew: דן איינבינדר; born 16 February 1989) is an Israeli former professional footballer. At international level, Einbinder was capped at under-18 and under-19 level, and made his senior debut in 2016.

== Early life ==
Einbinder was born and raised in Mevaseret Zion, Israel, to an Israeli family of Ashkenazi Jewish descent.

== Career ==
Einbinder started his youth career in Beitar Jerusalem, winning the championship title along with the State Cup in the 2006–07 season. In the 2007–08 season the team won a consecutive championship title win in the Israeli Noar Premier League with Einbinder in the starting lineup.

For the 2008–09 season Einbinder signed a four-year contract with the senior team of Beitar Jerusalem and participated in 4 league games with the club. During the 2009–10 season he was a regular choice to the first team.

On 3 September 2012, Einbinder signed a three-year contract with Ironi Kiryat Shmona for a transfer fee of 1.3 million Israeli new shekels. Overall, he played 29 league games for the club.

On 9 June 2013, Einbinder joined Maccabi Tel Aviv for three years in a deal that included the transfers of Guy Haimov and Tamir Kahlon to Ironi Kiryat Shmona. He made his debut for the club on 6 August 2013, in a UEFA Champions League knock-out match against the Swiss side FC Basel. On 8 September 2015, he was released from Maccabi.

On 4 October 2015, he signed again at Beitar Jerusalem.

In 2017, he signed at Hapoel Be'er Sheva.

In January 2021, he signed at Hapoel Tel Aviv.

== International career ==
Einbinder received his first call up to the senior Israel squad on 31 August 2016, for a 2018 FIFA World Cup qualifier against Italy. On 12 November 2016, Einbender scored his first international goal for Israel in a 2018 FIFA World Cup qualifier against Albania. It was his second cap and Israel won 3–0.

== Honours ==
=== Club ===
Beitar Jerusalem

- Israeli Premier League: 2007–08
- Israel State Cup: 2007–08, 2008–09
- Toto Cup: 2019–20

Maccabi Tel Aviv

- Israeli Premier League: 2013–14, 2014–15
- Israel State Cup: 2014–15
- Toto Cup: 2014–15

Hapoel Beer Sheva

- Israel Super Cup: 2017

== See also ==
- List of Jewish footballers
- List of Jews in sports
- List of Israelis
