= Amit Zenati =

Israeli footballer

Personal information
- Full name: Amit Zenati
- Date of birth: 2 April 1997 (age 29)
- Place of birth: Ashdod, Israel
- Height: 1.76 m (5 ft 9 1/2 in)
- Position: Forward

Team information
- Current team: Hapoel Rishon LeZion
- Number: 23

Youth career
- F.C. Ashdod
- Maccabi Haifa

Senior career*
Years	Team	Apps	(Gls)
2016–2022	Maccabi Haifa	28	(1)
2019–2022	→ Bnei Yehuda (loan)	79	(12)
2022–2023	Maccabi Bnei Reineh	13	(1)
2023	Hapoel Umm al-Fahm	6	(3)
2024	Hapoel Acre	4	(0)
2025	Maccabi Herzliya	15	(1)
2025–	Hapoel Rishon LeZion	15	(1)
- * Club domestic league appearances and goals as of 24 June 2026

Amit Zenati (Hebrew: עמית זנטי; born 2 April 1997) is an Israeli football player who plays for Hapoel Rishon LeZion.

== Club career ==
He made his professional debut in the 2016–17 UEFA Europa League for Maccabi Haifa F.C. on 21 July 2016 in the second leg of the second qualifying round against the Estonian club Nõmme Kalju FC, when he came on as a substitute in the 89th minute. Both games ended with a score of 1–1, necessitating a penalty shoot-out. Zenati was the only player whose shot was saved by the goalkeeper in the shootout, and as a result, Maccabi were eliminated from the competition.
