= Sun Menahem =

Israeli footballer

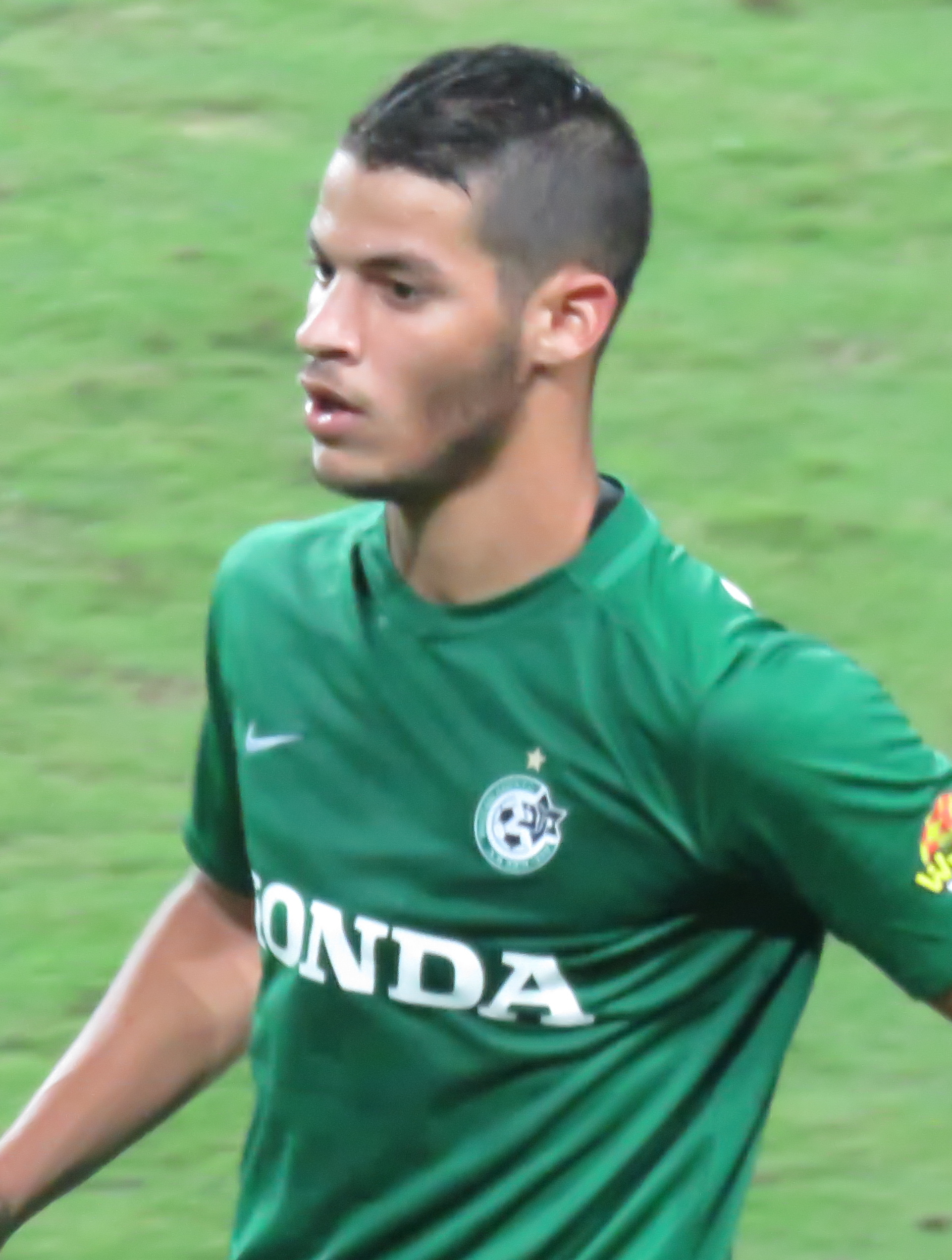
- Menahem playing for Maccabi Haifa in 2015

Personal information
- Date of birth: 7 September 1993 (age 33)
- Place of birth: Tel Aviv, Israel
- Height: 1.77 m (5 ft 9 1/2 in)
- Position: Left-back

Youth career
- 2006-2007: Bnei Yehuda
- 2007-2011: Shimshon Tel Aviv
- 2011–2013: Hapoel Ramat HaSharon

Senior career*
Years	Team	Apps	(Gls)
2013–2015	Hapoel Ramat HaSharon	35	(1)
2015–2024	Maccabi Haifa	167	(10)
2017–2018	→ Ironi Kiryat Shmona (loan)	31	(2)
Total		233	(13)

International career^{‡}
2019–2022	Israel	19	(0)
- * Club domestic league appearances and goals as of 9 May 2024 ‡ National team caps and goals as of 9 May 2024

Sun Menahem (or Menachem, Hebrew: סאן מנחם; born 7 September 1993) is an Israeli professional footballer who played as a defender.

== Early life ==
Menahem was born in Tel Aviv, Israel, to a Jewish family.

== Club career ==
He made his professional Israeli Premier League debut for Hapoel Nir Ramat HaSharon on 11 May 2013 in a game against Bnei Yehuda.

On 21 June 2015 Menhem signed a four-year deal with Maccabi Haifa. On 8 October 2018 he extended his contract with the club for three more years.

== International career ==
He received his first call-up to the Israel national football team in October 2019 for Euro 2020 qualifiers against Austria and Latvia. He made his debut on 15 October 2019 in a game against Latvia. He substituted Taleb Tawatha in the 79th minute as Israel won 3–1.

== Honours ==
=== Club ===
Maccabi Haifa

- Israeli Premier League: 2020–21, 2021–22, 2022–23
- Israel State Cup: 2015–16
- Toto Cup: 2021–22
- Israel Super Cup: 2021, 2023
