= Etiënne Reijnen =

Dutch footballer, manager and executive (born 1987)

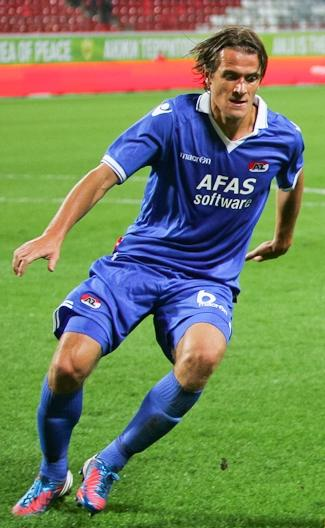
- Reijnen playing for AZ in 2012

Personal information
- Date of birth: 5 April 1987 (age 39)
- Place of birth: Zwolle, Netherlands
- Height: 1.89 m (6 ft 2 in)
- Position: Centre-back

Team information
- Current team: Feyenoord (assistant)

Youth career
- Rohda Raalte
- WVF
- Vitesse

Senior career*
Years	Team	Apps	(Gls)
2005–2011	PEC Zwolle	145	(9)
2011–2014	AZ	55	(2)
2014–2015	Cambuur	34	(1)
2015–2018	Groningen	65	(0)
2018–2019	Maccabi Haifa	32	(0)
2019–2020	PEC Zwolle	4	(0)
Total		335	(12)

Managerial career
- 2022–2023: PEC Zwolle (assistant)
- 2023: Cambuur (technical director)
- 2023–: Feyenoord (assistant)
- * Club domestic league appearances and goals

Etiënne Reijnen (born 5 April 1987) is a Dutch professional football manager and former player who is assistant manager at Eredivisie club Feyenoord.

== Career ==
=== Club ===
Born in Zwolle, he played for amateur clubs Rohda Raalte, WVF and Vitesse as a youth. In 2005, he joined PEC Zwolle in the Eerste divisie. In May 2010, Scottish club Falkirk were linked with a move for him, but he joined AZ in the Eredivisie in 2011, for a fee of around €100,000.

=== Managerial ===
Ahead of the 2022–23 season, Reijnen joined PEC Zwolle as assistant coach. For the 2023–24 season, he joined Cambuur as technical director. On 29 October 2023, Feyenoord announced that Reijnen had joined the club as assistant coach, where he would focus on analysing and providing technical advise to head coach Arne Slot.

== Career statistics ==
=== Club ===
As of match played 27 August 2017

Appearances and goals by club, season and competition
Club	Season	League			KNVB Cup		Europe		Other		Total	
Club	Season	Division	Apps	Goals	Apps	Goals	Apps	Goals	Apps	Goals	Apps	Goals
Zwolle	2005–06	Eerste Divisie	1	0	0	0	—		0	0	1	0
Zwolle	2006–07	Eerste Divisie	21	0	0	0	—		0	0	21	0
Zwolle	2007–08	Eerste Divisie	35	4	0	0	—		0	0	35	4
Zwolle	2008–09	Eerste Divisie	29	2	0	0	—		3 (Note: Appearances in the Eerste Divisie promotion play-offs)	0	32	2
Zwolle	2009–10	Eerste Divisie	37	3	1	0	—		2	0	40	3
Zwolle	2010–11	Eerste Divisie	21	0	2	0	—		0	0	23	0
Zwolle	PEC Zwolle		144	9	3	0	—		5	0	152	9
AZ	2011–12	Eredivisie	15	0	2	0	5 (Note: Appearances in the Europa League)	0	0	0	22	0
AZ	2012–13	Eredivisie	31	2	6	0	2	0	0	0	39	2
AZ	2013–14	Eredivisie	9	0	4	0	4	0	0	0	17	0
AZ	AZ		55	2	12	0	11	0	0	0	78	2
Cambuur	2014–15	Eredivisie	33	1	4	0	—		0	0	37	1
Cambuur	2015–16	Eredivisie	1	0	0	0	—		0	0	1	0
Cambuur	SC Cambuur		34	1	4	0	—		0	0	38	1
Groningen	2015–16	Eredivisie	34	0	2	0	5	0	0	0	41	0
Groningen	2016–17	Eredivisie	29	0	1	0	—		0	0	30	0
Groningen	2017–18	Eredivisie	2	0	0	0	—		0	0	2	0
Groningen	FC Groningen		65	0	3	0	5	0	0	0	73	0
Career total			298	12	22	0	16	0	5	0	341	12

== Honours ==
=== Player ===
AZ

- KNVB Cup: 2012–13

=== Coach ===
Feyenoord

- KNVB Cup: 2023–24
