= Georges Mandjeck =

Cameroonian footballer (born 1988)

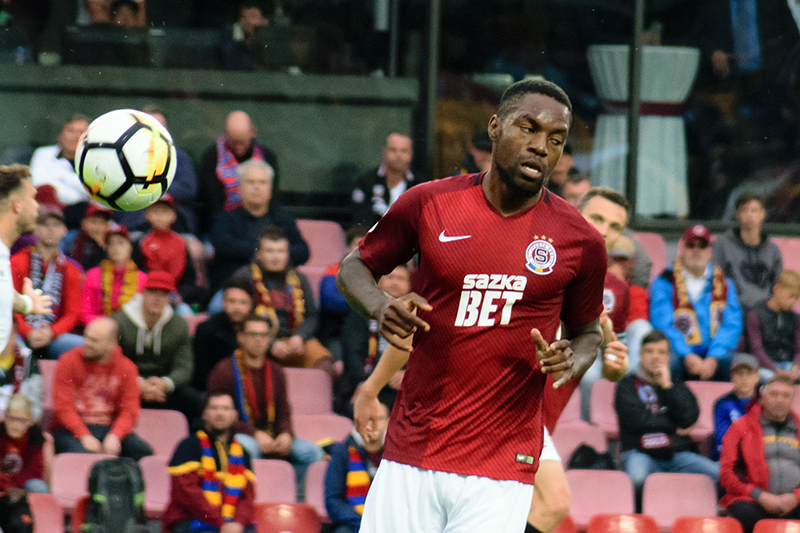
- Mandjeck with Sparta

Personal information
- Full name: Georges Constant Mandjeck
- Date of birth: 9 December 1988 (age 37)
- Place of birth: Douala, Cameroon
- Height: 1.85 m (6 ft 1 in)
- Position: Midfielder

Youth career
- Kadji Sports Academy

Senior career*
| Years | Team | Apps | (Gls) |
| 2006–2007 | Kadji Sports Academy | | |
| 2007–2010 | VfB Stuttgart | 3 | (0) |
| 2008 | → 1. FC Kaiserslautern (loan) | 10 | (0) |
| 2009–2010 | → 1. FC Kaiserslautern (loan) | 23 | (0) |
| 2010–2012 | Rennes | 41 | (0) |
| 2012–2013 | Auxerre | 42 | (0) |
| 2013–2015 | Kayseri Erciyesspor | 36 | (1) |
| 2015–2017 | Metz | 56 | (3) |
| 2017–2020 | Sparta Prague | 26 | (0) |
| 2018 | → Metz (loan) | 14 | (0) |
| 2018–2019 | → Maccabi Haifa (loan) | 32 | (5) |
| 2020–2021 | Waasland-Beveren | 16 | (0) |
| 2021–2022 | Kocaelispor | 29 | (0) |
| 2022–2023 | Nea Salamis | 31 | (0) |
| 2023–2024 | Ironi Kiryat Shmona | 17 | (2) |

International career^{‡}
| 2008 | Cameroon Olympic | 2 | (1) |
| 2009–2019 | Cameroon | 51 | (0) |
Medal record
Men's football
Representing Cameroon
Africa Cup of Nations
| Winner | 2017 Gabon |
- * Club domestic league appearances and goals as of 5 June 2023 ‡ National team caps and goals as of 23 September 2022

Georges Constant Mandjeck (born 9 December 1988) is a Cameroonian former professional footballer who played as a midfielder.

== Club career ==
=== Stuttgart ===
Mandjeck joined Stuttgart from Kadji Sports Academy in the summer of 2007 and made his competitive debut for the club on 25 July 2007 in their 2–0 home defeat to Bayern Munich in the semi-finals of the Premiere-Ligapokal, coming on as a substitute for Antônio da Silva in the 89th minute. It turned out to be his only competitive appearance for Stuttgart during the 2007–08 season.

=== Loan to Kaiserslautern ===
On 30 January 2008, Mandjeck was loaned out to 2. Bundesliga side 1. FC Kaiserslautern until the end of the season. He made his league debut for the club on 1 February 2008 in their 1–1 away draw at Borussia Mönchengladbach, starting the match and being replaced by Moussa Ouattara in the 67th minute. He went on to make a total of 10 league appearances for Kaiserslautern before returning to Stuttgart upon the end of the season.

=== Back at Stuttgart ===
Mandjeck's first competitive appearance since returning to Stuttgart came on 28 August 2008 in the club's 4–1 away win at Hungarian side Győri ETO FC in the second leg of the second qualifying round for the UEFA Cup, coming on as a substitute for Pável Pardo in the 63rd minute. He went on to make his Bundesliga debut on 13 September 2008 in Stuttgart's goalless draw away at 1899 Hoffenheim, coming off the bench to replace Khalid Boulahrouz in the 84th minute.

=== Second loan to Kaiserslautern ===
In July 2009, Mandjeck was again loaned to 1. FC Kaiserslautern until the end of the 2009–10 season. He made his first competitive appearance of the season on 31 July 2009 in Kaiserslautern's 1–0 win at Eintracht Braunschweig in the first round of the German Cup and also appeared in the club's opening league match of the season on 8 August 2009, a 2–1 win at home to Greuther Fürth, playing the full 90 minutes in both of these two games. He subsequently established himself as a regular at the club.

=== Stade Rennais ===
In July 2010, he moved to Stade Rennais F.C.

=== Auxerre ===
In January 2013, he moved to Auxerre.

=== Kayseri Erciyesspor ===
Mandjeck moved to Kayseri Erciyesspor at a fee of €4 million. He signed a contract until 2016.

=== Loan to Metz ===
On 11 January 2018, Sparta Prague loaned Mandjeck to Ligue 1 side FC Metz until the end of the season.

=== Waasland-Beveren ===
On 29 September 2020, Mandjeck joined Belgian Belgian First Division A side Waasland-Beveren.

=== Kocaelispor ===
On 8 July 2021, he signed with Kocaelispor in Turkey.

== International career ==
Mandjeck was part of Cameroon's squad for the 2008 Summer Olympics. He came on as a substitute in their first group game against South Korea, where he scored a goal to earn Cameroon a 1–1 draw. He made his second appearance in the team's third group game, a goalless draw against Italy, where he was sent off for stamping on the foot of Antonio Nocerino.

== Career statistics ==
=== International ===
As of matches played on 12 July 2019

Cameroon national team
| Year | Apps | Goals |
| 2009 | 1 | 0 |
| 2010 | 9 | 0 |
| 2011 | 2 | 0 |
| 2012 | 6 | 0 |
| 2013 | 0 | 0 |
| 2014 | 6 | 0 |
| 2015 | 2 | 0 |
| 2016 | 2 | 0 |
| 2017 | 12 | 0 |
| 2018 | 5 | 0 |
| 2019 | 5 | 0 |
| Total | 50 | 0 |

== Honours ==
Cameroon

- Africa Cup of Nations: 2017
