= Roi Reinshreiber =

Israeli football referee

- Born: 28 June 1980 (age 46); Israel

Domestic
Years	League	Role
2010–	Liga Leumit	Referee
2010–	Israeli Premier League	Referee

International
Years	League	Role
2014–	FIFA listed	Referee

Roi Reinshreiber (Hebrew: רועי ריינשרייבר; born 28 June 1980) is an Israeli football referee who officiates in the Israeli Premier League. He has been a FIFA referee since 2014, and is ranked as a UEFA first category referee.

== Refereeing career ==
In 2010, Reinshreiber began officiating in Liga Leumit and the Israeli Premier League. His first Premier League match as referee was on 2 May 2010 between Hapoel Be'er Sheva and Maccabi Petah Tikva. In 2014, he was put on the FIFA referees list. He officiated his first UEFA club competition match on 17 July 2014, a meeting between Turkish club Bursaspor and Georgian club Chikhura Sachkhere in the 2014–15 UEFA Europa League second qualifying round. His first senior international match as a referee came on 10 October 2017, a 2018 FIFA World Cup qualification fixture between Hungary and the Faroe Islands.

Reinshreiber was selected as a match official for the 2015 UEFA European Under-17 Championship in Bulgaria and the 2016 UEFA European Under-19 Championship in Germany. In May 2016, he officiated the 2016 Israel State Cup Final between Maccabi Tel Aviv and Maccabi Haifa. The following year, he was the referee for the 2017 Israel Super Cup between Hapoel Be'er Sheva and Bnei Yehuda Tel Aviv.

On 23 April 2021, Reinshreiber was selected by FIFA as a video assistant referee for the football tournaments at the 2020 Summer Olympics in Japan.

== See also ==
- List of Jews in sports (non-players)
