= Neta Lavi =

Israeli footballer

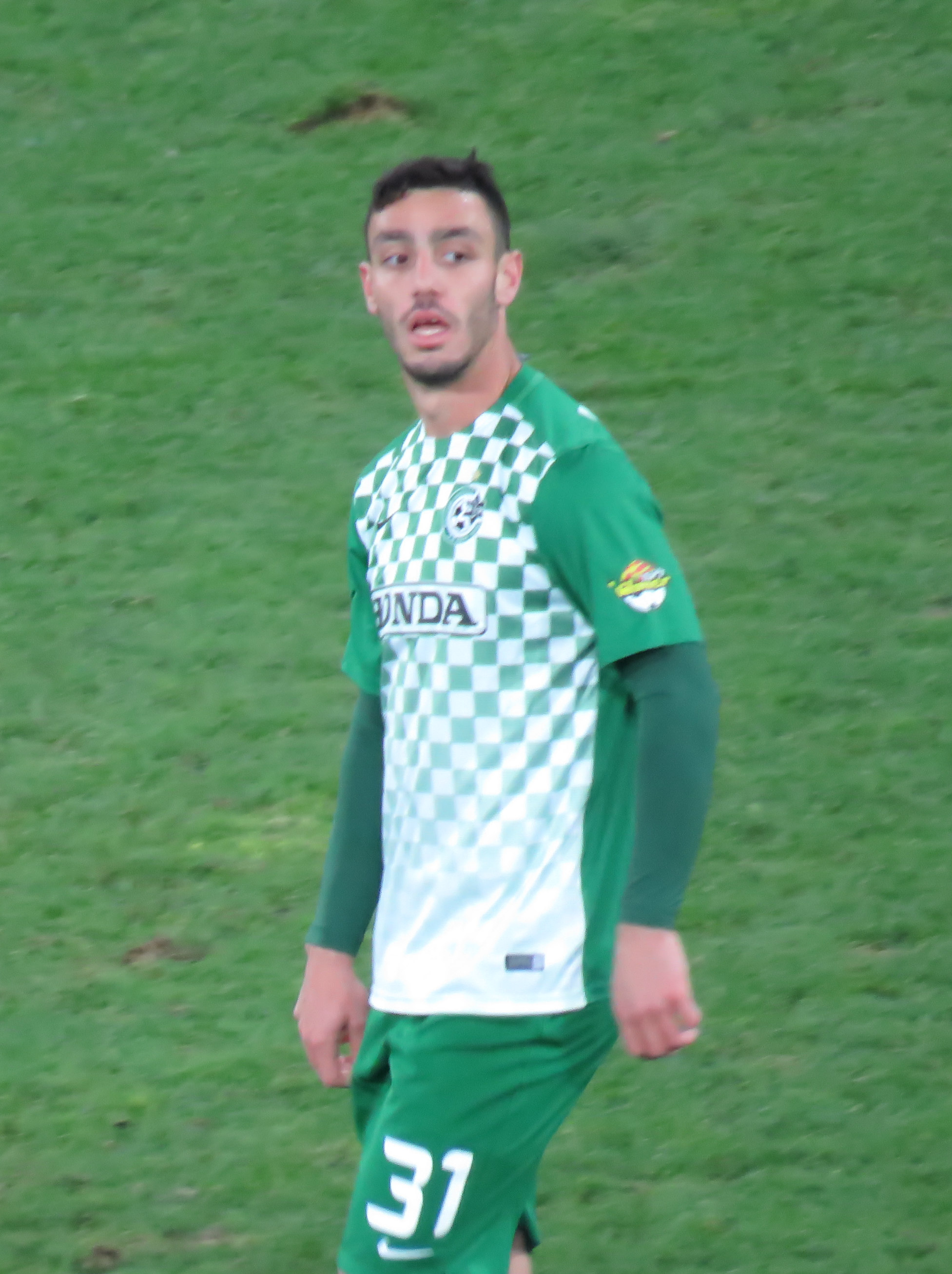
- Lavi playing for Maccabi Haifa in 2016

Personal information
- Date of birth: 25 August 1996 (age 30)
- Place of birth: Ramat HaShofet, Israel
- Position: Midfielder

Team information
- Current team: Machida Zelvia
- Number: 31

Youth career
- 2010–2015: Maccabi Haifa

Senior career*
Years	Team	Apps	(Gls)
2015–2023	Maccabi Haifa	197	(7)
2023–2025	Gamba Osaka	66	(1)
2025–	Machida Zelvia	23	(1)

International career^{‡}
2013	Israel U17	7	(0)
2013	Israel U18	4	(0)
2014	Israel U19	8	(0)
2016–2018	Israel U21	12	(0)
2016–	Israel	25	(0)
- * Club domestic league appearances and goals as of 9 August 2026 ‡ National team caps and goals as of 20:00, 3 June 2026 (UTC)

Neta Lavi (Hebrew: נטע לביא; born 25 August 1996) is an Israeli footballer who plays as a defensive midfielder for J1 League club Machida Zelvia and the Israel national team.

== Club career ==
In 2010, Lavi joined the Maccabi Haifa youth team. He became captain of the Maccabi Haifa youth team that won the double in 2014.

Lavi has made his official debut for the senior Maccabi Haifa on 28 October 2015 in a game against Hapoel Ironi Kiryat Shmona in the Toto Cup. Lavi made his Israeli Premier League debut for the senior Maccabi Haifa on 7 December 2015, in a match against Hapoel Haifa.

On 27 January 2023 signed for J1 League club Gamba Osaka.

On 12 August 2025, Lavi announce official transfer to fellow J1 League club, Machida Zelvia for mid 2025 season.

== International career ==
Lavi was part of the Israeli youth national team and Played 8 times for the Israeli U-19 and 12 times for the Israeli U-21 national side, under Israeli manager Arik Benado.

Lavi made his debut for the senior Israel national team on 31 May 2016, coming on as a substitute during a friendly match against Serbia.

== Career statistics ==
=== Club ===
As of match played 12 August 2025

Club	Season	League			Cup		League Cup		Continental		Other		Total	
Club	Season	Division	Apps	Goals	Apps	Goals	Apps	Goals	Apps	Goals	Apps	Goals	Apps	Goals
Maccabi Haifa	2014–15	Israeli Premier League	0	0	—		—		—		—		4	0
Maccabi Haifa	2015–16	Israeli Premier League	22	0	6	0	3	0	—		—		31	0
Maccabi Haifa	2016–17	Israeli Premier League	31	0	1	0	6	0	2	0	1	0	41	0
Maccabi Haifa	2017–18	Israeli Premier League	7	0	—		4	1	—		—		11	1
Maccabi Haifa	2018–19	Israeli Premier League	34	3	1	0	5	1	—		—		40	3
Maccabi Haifa	2019–20	Israeli Premier League	33	2	3	0	1	0	4	0	—		41	2
Maccabi Haifa	2020–21	Israeli Premier League	34	2	4	1	2	0	4	0	—		44	3
Maccabi Haifa	2021–22	Israeli Premier League	19	0	5	1	—		2	0	0	0	26	1
Maccabi Haifa	2022–23	Israeli Premier League	17	0	1	1	—		12	0	1	0	31	1
Maccabi Haifa	Total		197	7	21	3	21	2	24	0	2	0	265	12
Gamba Osaka	2023	J1 League	27	0	1	0	3	0	—				31	0
Gamba Osaka	2024	J1 League	21	0	2	1	0	0	—				23	1
Gamba Osaka	2025	J1 League	18	1	2	0	2	0	—				22	1
Gamba Osaka	Total		76	1	5	1	5	0	–				86	2
Machida Zelvia	2025	J1 League	0	0	0	0	0	0	0	0	—		0	0
Machida Zelvia	Total		0	0	0	0	0	0	0	0	–		0	0
Career total			224	7	22	3	24	2	24	0	2	0	296	12

=== International ===
As of match played 3 June 2026

Appearances and goals by national team and year
National team	Year	Apps	Goals
Israel	2016	1	0
Israel	2020	3	0
Israel	2021	5	0
Israel	2022	3	0
Israel	2023	8	0
Israel	2024	4	0
Israel	2026	1	0
Total		25	0

== Honours ==
Maccabi Haifa

- Israeli Premier League: 2020–21, 2021–22, 2022–23
- Israel State Cup: 2015–16
- Toto Cup: 2021–22
- Israel Super Cup: 2021

Sporting positions
Preceded by Rami Gershon	Maccabi Haifa F.C. captain 2019–2022	Succeeded by Tjaronn Chery
