= Dor Elo =

Israeli footballer

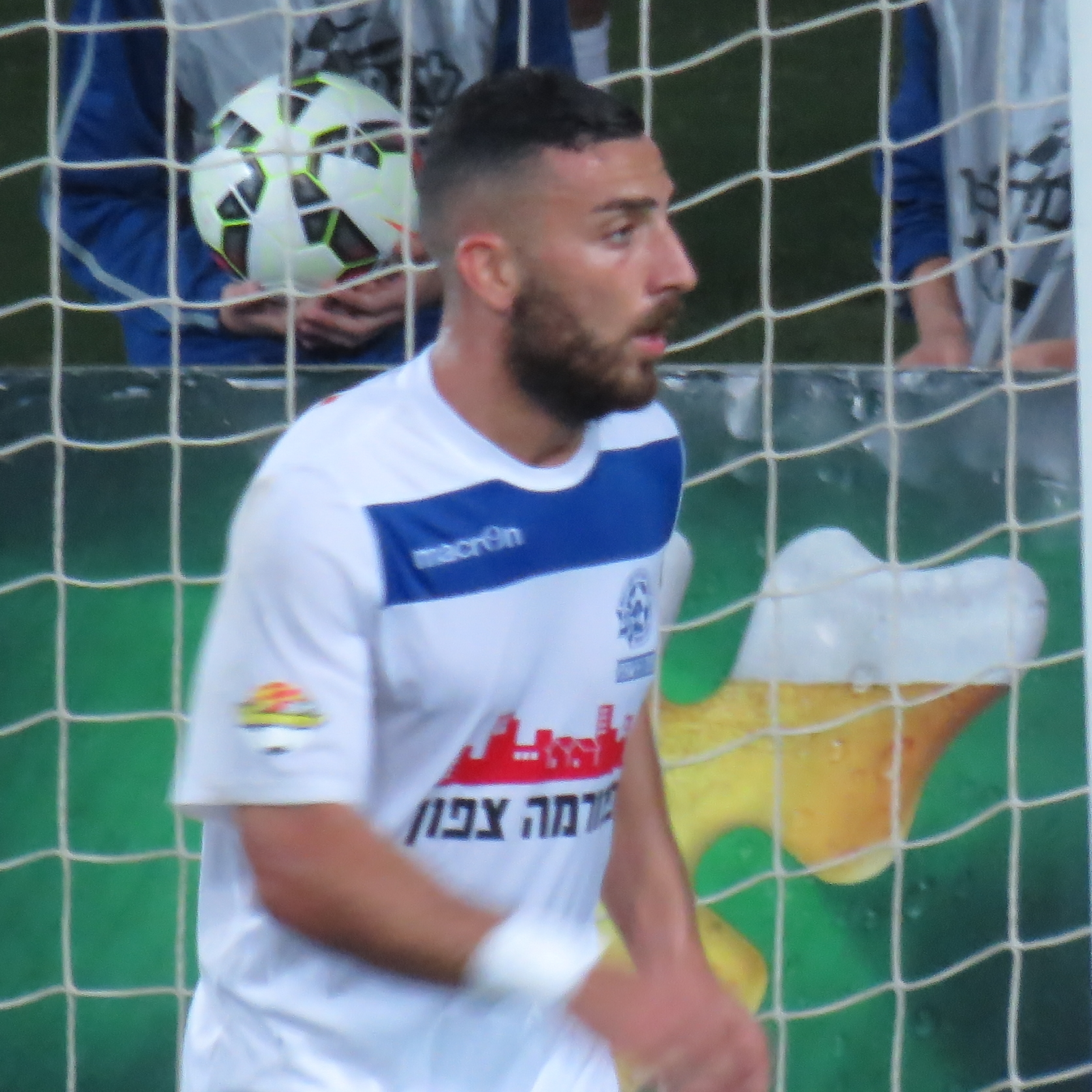

Personal information
- Full name: Dor Elo
- Date of birth: September 26, 1993 (age 33)
- Place of birth: Petah Tikva, Israel
- Height: 1.79 m (5 ft 10 1/2 in)
- Position: Right back

Team information
- Current team: Maccabi Bnei Reineh
- Number: 18

Youth career
- Maccabi Petah Tikva

Senior career*
Years	Team	Apps	(Gls)
2012–2017	Maccabi Petah Tikva	95	(3)
2017–2020	Hapoel Be'er Sheva	25	(0)
2019–2020	→ Bnei Yehuda (loan)	15	(0)
2020–2021	Ironi Kiryat Shmona	32	(0)
2021–2022	Maccabi Petah Tikva	13	(0)
2022–2023	Hapoel Tel Aviv	12	(0)
2023–2024	Maccabi Bnei Reineh	2	(0)
- * Club domestic league appearances and goals

Dor Elo (Hebrew: דור אלו; born 26 September 1993) is a former Israeli footballer who played as defender.

== Honours ==
=== Club ===
Hapoel Be'er Sheva

- Israel Super Cup (1): 2017
