= Mohammed Awaed =

Israeli footballer

Personal information
- Date of birth: 9 June 1997 (age 29)
- Place of birth: Tamra, Israel
- Height: 1.82 m (5 ft 11 1/2 in)
- Position: Forward

Team information
- Current team: Kafr Qasim
- Number: 9

Youth career
- 2006–2016: Maccabi Haifa

Senior career*
| Years | Team | Apps | (Gls) |
| 2016–2022 | Maccabi Haifa | 90 | (15) |
| 2020–2021 | → Lech Poznań (loan) | 9 | (1) |
| 2020 | → Lech Poznań II (loan) | 2 | (0) |
| 2021–2022 | → Maccabi Petah Tikva (loan) | 15 | (3) |
| 2022–2023 | Bnei Sakhnin | 10 | (1) |
| 2025 | Pas de la Casa | 5 | (0) |
| 2026– | Kafr Qasim | 7 | (0) |

International career
| 2015 | Israel U19 | 2 | (0) |
| 2017–2018 | Israel U21 | 2 | (0) |
- * Club domestic league appearances and goals as of 24 June 2026

Mohammed Awaed (sometimes Muhamad Awad or Mohammad Awad, Arabic: محمد عواد, Hebrew: מוחמד עואד; born 9 June 1997) is an Israeli professional footballer who plays as a forward.

== Early life ==
Awaed was born in Tamra, Israel, to a Muslim-Arab family.

== Club career ==
Awaed made his Israeli Premier League debut for Maccabi Haifa on 10 September 2016, in an away match against Bnei Yehuda Tel Aviv which ended in a 1–1 draw.

== Honours ==
Maccabi Haifa

- Israeli Premier League: 2020–21
- Israel Super Cup: 2021
