= Guy Haimov =

Israeli footballer (born 1986)

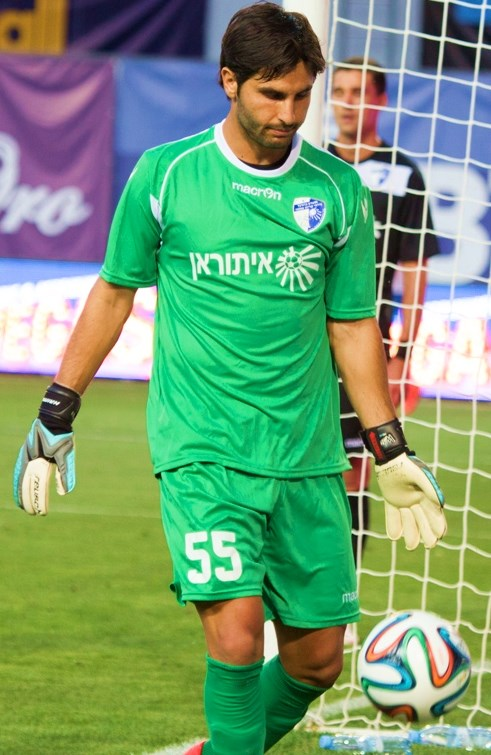
- Haimov playing for Ironi Kiryat Shmona in 2014

Personal information
- Full name: Guy Haimov
- Date of birth: 9 March 1986 (age 40)
- Place of birth: Holon, Israel
- Height: 1.83 m (6 ft 0 in)
- Position: Goalkeeper

Youth career
- 2000–2004: Maccabi Tel Aviv

Senior career*
Years	Team	Apps	(Gls)
2003–2013	Maccabi Tel Aviv	20	(0)
2006–2008	→ Hapoel Kfar Saba	3	(0)
2009–2010	→ Hakoah Amidar	31	(0)
2010–2011	→ Ironi Kiryat Shmona	24	(0)
2012–2013	→ AEK Larnaca	29	(0)
2013–2016	Ironi Kiryat Shmona	92	(0)
2016–2018	Hapoel Be'er Sheva	40	(0)
2018–2020	Maccabi Haifa	41	(0)

International career^{‡}
2002–2003	Israel U17	10	(0)
2003–2004	Israel U18	3	(0)
2004–2005	Israel U19	4	(0)
2011–2018	Israel	3	(0)
- * Club domestic league appearances and goals as of 20:45, 24 January 2020 (UTC) ‡ National team caps and goals as of 03:38, 12 July 2009 (UTC)

Guy Haimov (Hebrew: גיא חיימוב; born 9 March 1986) is an Israeli former professional footballer who played as a goalkeeper.

== Early life ==
Haimov was born and raised in Holon, Israel.

== Club career ==
Haimov grew up playing for the Maccabi Tel Aviv youth systems . He was part of the youth team that won the 2003/2004 Youth Championship. Although he was a part of the senior squad for 3 seasons he never played a League match for Maccabi Tel Aviv but took part in Toto Cup matches.

Haimov made his league debut in a Premier League match against Hakoah Maccabi Amidar/Ramat Gan on 10 February 2007 for Hapoel Kfar Saba with which he spent 2 seasons on loan.

Haimov was back in Maccabi Tel Aviv after signing a 3-year contract.

On 8 August 2012, Haimov was loaned to AEK Larnaca from the Cypriot First Division.

== International career ==
In 2003, Haimov was part of the Israel U17 that participated at the 2003 UEFA European Under-17 Football Championship.

On 6 September 2011 Haimov made his senior international debut replacing injured Dudu Aouate at half time on Israel's EURO 2012 qualifier against Croatia in Zagreb he conceded 3 goals resulting in 3–1 loss.

== Honours ==
=== Club ===
Hapoel Kiryat Shmona

- Israel Super Cup (1): 2015

Hapoel Beer Sheva

- Israeli Premier League (2): 2016-17, 2017-18
- Israel Super Cup (2): 2016, 2017
- Toto Cup (1): 2016–17

== See also ==
- List of Jewish footballers
- List of Jews in sports
- List of Israelis
