= Shay Konstantini =

Israeli footballer (born 1996)

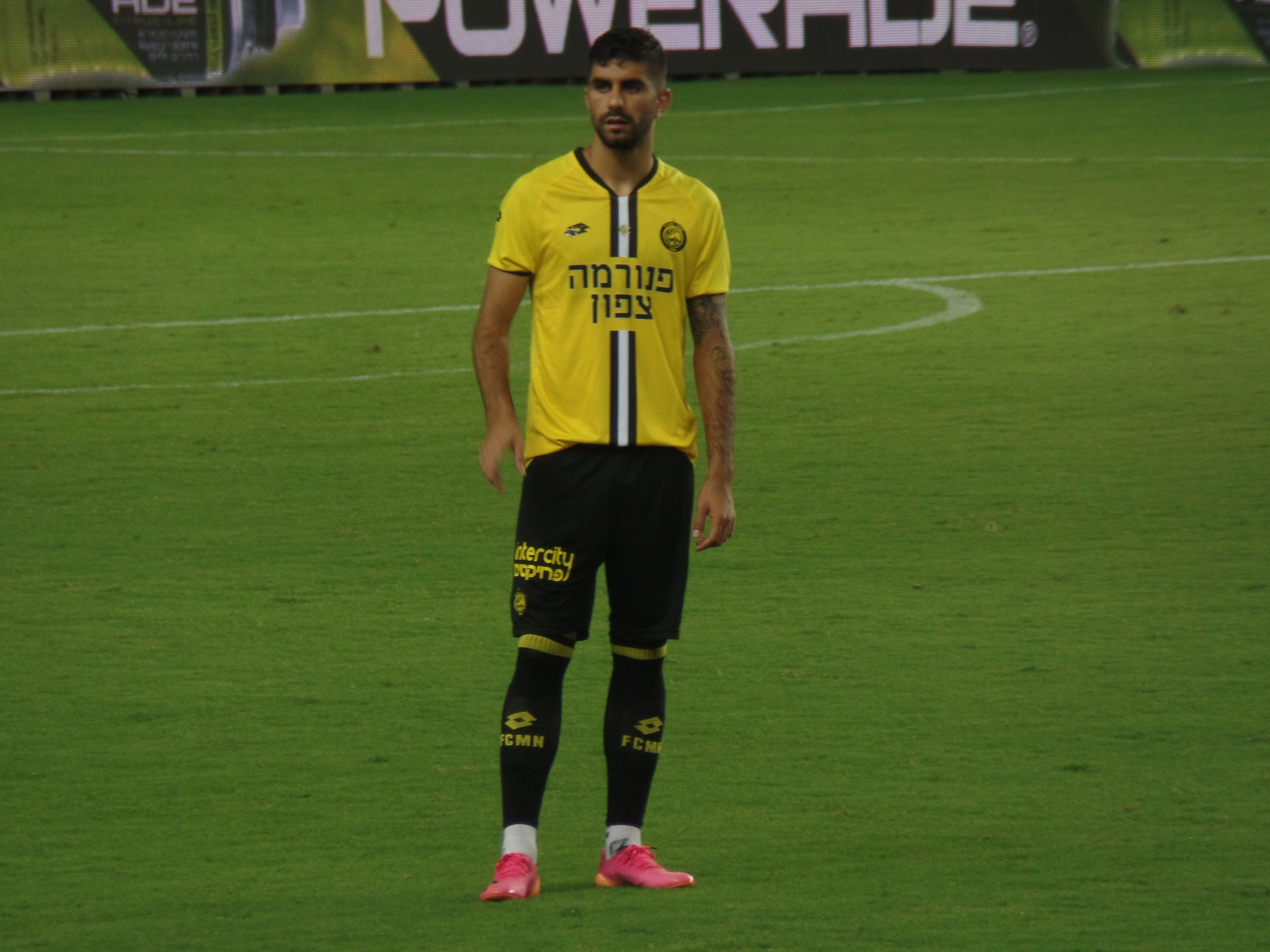

Personal information
- Full name: Shay Haim Konstantini
- Date of birth: 27 June 1996 (age 30)
- Place of birth: Holon, Israel
- Height: 1.71 m (5 ft 7 in)
- Position: Right back

Team information
- Current team: Hapoel Kfar Shalem
- Number: 36

Youth career
- Hapoel Tzafririm Holon
- Bnei Yehuda Tel Aviv

Senior career*
Years	Team	Apps	(Gls)
2015–2019	Bnei Yehuda Tel Aviv	53	(7)
2018	→ Hapoel Nazareth Illit (loan)	18	(1)
2019–2021	Beitar Jerusalem	49	(3)
2021–2023	Maccabi Netanya	40	(0)
2023–2025	Ironi Tiberias	63	(1)
2025–2026	Hapoel Kfar Shalem	20	(3)
2026–	Hapoel Rishon LeZion	0	(0)

International career
2016–2019	Israel U21	1	(0)
- * Club domestic league appearances and goals as of 27 May 2026

Shay Haim Konstantini (Hebrew: שי חַיִּים קונסטנטין; born 27 June 1996) is an Israeli professional footballer who plays as a defender for Israeli Premier League side Hapoel Rishon LeZion.

== Club career ==
=== Bnei Yehuda Tel Aviv ===
Konstantini rose up the ranks of Bnei Yehuda Tel Aviv, finding great success with the under-19 squad in particular. He was called up to the senior squad for the 2014–15 season; they were playing in the second-tier Liga Leumit at the time. He made his senior debut on 13 March 2015, coming on for Ness Zamir in the 70th minute of a 2–1 win against Ironi Tiberias. He made three more appearances that season, while Bnei Yehuda finished first in the league and earnined promotion to the Israeli Premier League. Konstantini then made his Premier League debut on 12 September 2015, playing the first 70 minutes of a 3–1 loss against Maccabi Petah Tikva.

==== Loan to Hapoel Nazareth Illit ====
In January 2018, after making only one appearance for Bnei Yehuda, Konstantini was loaned to Hapoel Nazareth Illit until the end of the season.

=== Beitar Jerusalem ===
Following the departure of David Keltjens, Beitar Jerusalem signed Konstantini on a three-year deal, paying 400,000 shekel and transferring to Bnei Yehuda the rights for Avishay Cohen.

=== Maccabi Netanya ===
In May 2021, Beitar Jerusalem agreed to release Konstantini from the final year of his contract and he joined Maccabi Netanya, signing a three-year deal with an option for another season.

=== Ironi Tiberias ===
On 17 July 2023 signed for Liga Leumit club Ironi Tiberias.

== International career ==
In January 2013, Konstantini was invited by coach Alon Hazan to train with the Israel national under-17 team. In 2016, Konstantini was part of the Israel national under-21 team which competed at the Valeriy Lobanovskyi Memorial Tournament, helping the team reach the final, where they beat Serbia 3–2 to win the tournament.

== Honours ==
=== Club ===
Bnei Yehuda Tel Aviv

- Liga Leumit: 2014–15
- Toto Cup Leumit: Runners-up 2014–15
- Israel State Cup: 2016–17

Beitar Jerusalem

- Israeli Toto Cup: 2019–20
