= Shlomi Yosef Azulay =

Israeli footballer

Shlomi Azulay
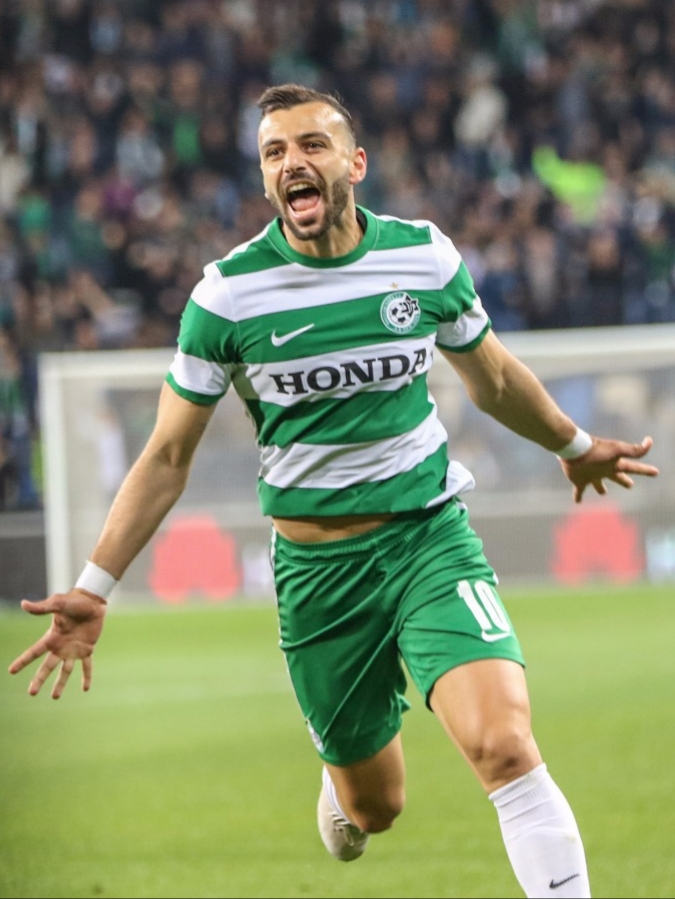
- Azulay playing for Maccabi Haifa in 2018

Personal information
- Full name: Shlomi Yosef Azulay
- Date of birth: 30 March 1990 (age 36)
- Place of birth: Hadera, Israel
- Height: 1.86 m (6 ft 1 in)
- Position: Central midfielder

Team information
- Current team: Hapoel Hadera
- Number: 8

Youth career
- 2000–2009: Maccabi Haifa

Senior career*
Years	Team	Apps	(Gls)
2009–2012	Maccabi Haifa	0	(0)
2010	→ Hapoel Petah Tikva (loan)	1	(0)
2010–2012	→ Hapoel Herzliya (loan)	45	(8)
2012–2013	Hapoel Haifa	6	(0)
2013–2015	Hapoel Rishon LeZion	34	(10)
2014–2015	→ Beitar Jerusalem (loan)	40	(6)
2015–2017	Maccabi Tel Aviv	28	(4)
2016–2017	→ Ironi Kiryat Shmona (loan)	33	(8)
2017–2019	Maccabi Haifa	34	(3)
2019	→ Hapoel Haifa (loan)	6	(0)
2019–2021	Ashdod	59	(12)
2021–2023	Hapoel Tel Aviv	40	(2)
2023–2024	Ashdod	18	(2)
2024–2025	Hapoel Ra'anana	14	(2)
2025–	Hapoel Hadera	38	(4)

International career
2010–2012	Israel U19	2	(0)
- * Club domestic league appearances and goals as of 24 June 2026

Shlomi Yosef Azulay (Hebrew: שלומי יוסף אזולאי; born 30 March 1990) is an Israeli professional footballer who plays as a central midfielder for Hapoel Hadera.

== Career ==
Azulay began his career in the youth teams of Maccabi Haifa. In 2009, he joined Maccabi Haifa's senior team but was loaned to Hapoel Petah Tikva in 2010 before he could debut in Maccabi Haifa. On 31 October 2010, he made his debut in the Israeli Premier League after coming on as a substitute in the 89th minute in a 1–0 loss to his former team, Maccabi Haifa.

After not playing much in Petah Tikva, he was loaned to Hapoel Herzliya from the second division and until the end of the season he scored three goals in 13 appearances and helped the team stay in the league. The next season, he scored five goals in 32 appearances, at the end of the season Hapoel Herzliya was relegated to the third division

In the summer of 2012, with the end of his contract, Azulay was released from Maccabi Haifa and signed for the local rival, Hapoel Haifa but only played five matches in the 2012–13 season. In 2013, he signed for Hapoel Rishon LeZion from the second division, he scored 10 goals in 31 appearances and was the team's top scorer in the 2013–14 season.

On 21 July 2014, Azulay signed a one-year contract with F.C. Beitar Jerusalem. On 22 September 2014, he scored his first goal in the Israeli Premier League, in a 1–0 victory over Maccabi Haifa. Overall, he scored four goals in 34 appearances.

=== Maccabi Tel Aviv ===
On 10 August 2015, Azulay signed a four-year contract with Maccabi Tel Aviv. On 15 August, he made his debut in Maccabi during the Super Cup match after coming on as a substitute in the 67th minute, Maccabi lost 5–4 to Ironi Kiryat Shmona after a penalty shootout.

On 7 September 2016, he moved on loan to Ironi Kiryat Shmona.

=== Maccabi Haifa ===
On 29 August 2017, Azulay signed a two-year contract with his former club Maccabi Haifa.
