= Ayid Habshi =

Israeli footballer

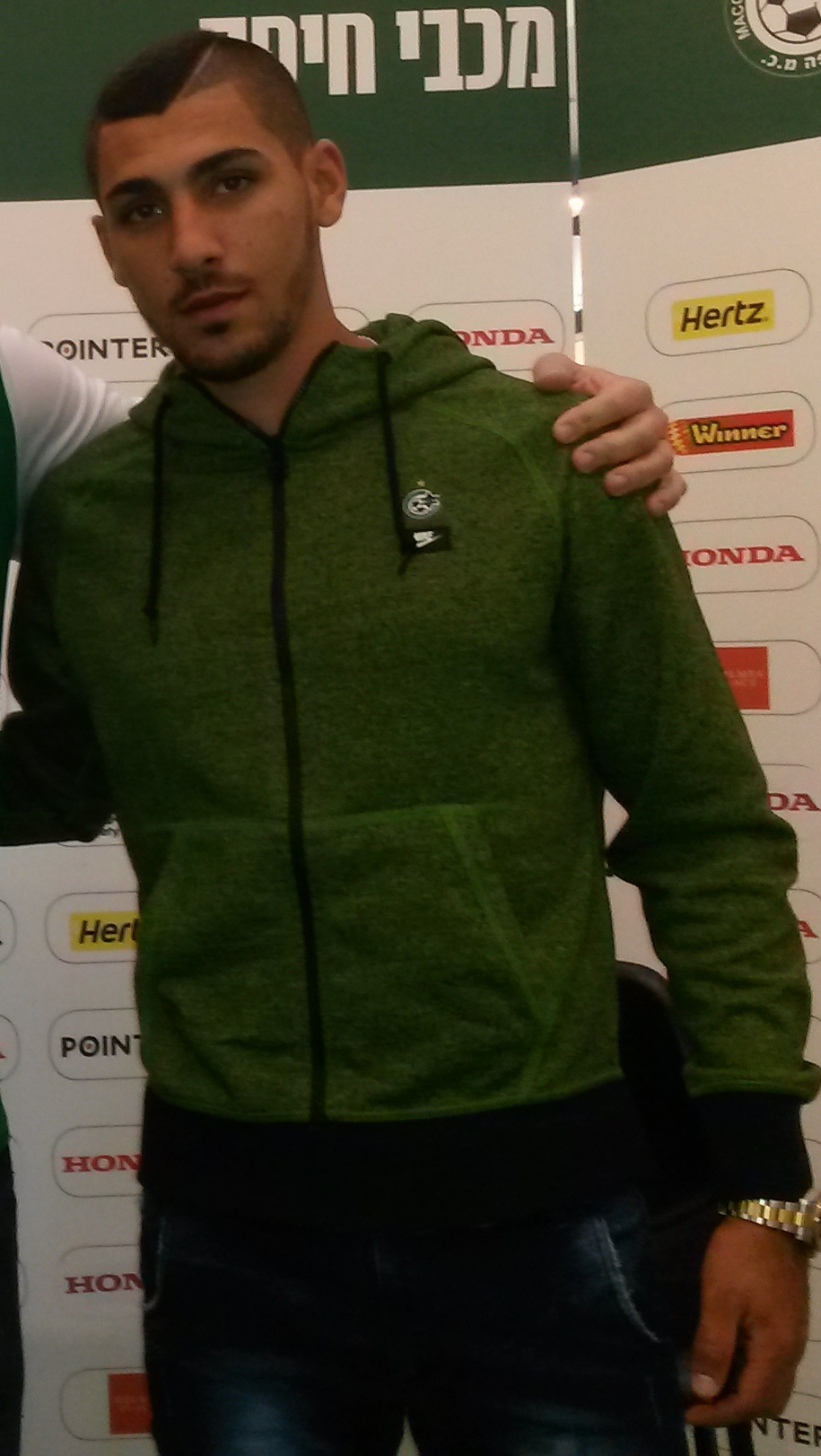
- Habashi with Maccabi Haifa in 2016

Personal information
- Full name: Ayid Habshi
- Date of birth: 10 May 1995 (age 31)
- Place of birth: Iksal, Israel
- Height: 1.86 m (6 ft 1 in)
- Position: Center-back

Team information
- Current team: Maccabi Bnei Reineh
- Number: 5

Youth career
- 2009–2013: Maccabi Haifa

Senior career*
| Years | Team | Apps | (Gls) |
| 2013–2021 | Maccabi Haifa | 83 | (1) |
| 2015 | → Bnei Sakhnin (loan) | 13 | (0) |
| 2017 | → Hapoel Ra'anana (loan) | 4 | (0) |
| 2017–2018 | → Bnei Yehuda Tel Aviv (loan) | 36 | (1) |
| 2021–2025 | Ironi Kiryat Shmona | 124 | (14) |
| 2025– | Maccabi Bnei Reineh | 26 | (0) |

International career^{‡}
| 2012–2015 | Israel U19 | 12 | (0) |
| 2016–2017 | Israel U21 | 14 | (0) |
| 2018– | Israel | 4 | (0) |
- * Club domestic league appearances and goals as of 24 June 2026 ‡ National team caps and goals as of 24 March 2019

Ayid Habshi (or Habashi, Arabic: عايِد حبشي, Hebrew: עאיד חבשי; born 10 May 1995) is an Israeli footballer who plays as a centre-back for Ironi Kiryat Shmona.

== Early life ==
Habshi was born in Iksal, Israel, to a Muslim-Arab family.

== Club career ==
Habshi began his career with Hapoel Rishon Lezion, and when he was 14 years old he moved to Maccabi Haifa's youth academy. On 28 November 2012 Habshi made his debut with Maccabi Haifa's senior team, when he opened the game in a 3-2 Toto cup's loss against Maccabi Netanya. On 21 April 2012 Habshi made his debut in the Israel Premier League in a 2–1 loss against Bnei Yehuda Tel Aviv. During the 2013–14 season, he participated in 3 games of Maccabi Haifa's senior team and continued to play with the youth academy.

On 3 February 2015, Habshi was loaned to Bnei Sakhin in a loan deal which included the moving of Abraham Paz to Maccabi Haifa. In Bnei Sakhin he was usually a lineup player and participated in 13 games until the end of the 2014–15 season. Habshi returned to Maccabi Haifa prior to the beginning of the 2015–16 season. During that season, he participated in 15 games and played an important role in winning the Israel State Cup

On 14 June 2017, Habshi made his European debut in a 1–1 draw against Nõmme Kalju. On 1 February 2017, he was loaned to Hapoel Ranana and there he participated in 4 games until the end of the 2016–17 season. On 27 June 2017, Habshi was loaned to Bnei Yehuda Tel Aviv. On 9 December 2017 he scored his first career goal in a 2–1 win against Maccabi Netanya. During the 2017–18 season, Habshi was a lineup player for all 36 Maccabi Netanya league games and the team finished the season on the top playoff.

Habshi returned to Haifa for the 2017–18 season.

On 20 August 2019, it was reported that Habshi has signed a 5-year extension with the club. Habshi added that "Maccabi Haifa is more than a home for me. It is a family and a way of life. I am happy about the club's belief in me and to stay here for the next few years. I will continue giving my all for the club and its amazing fans."

== Honours ==
=== Club ===
Maccabi Haifa

- Israeli Premier League (1): 2020–21
- Israel State Cup (1): 2015–16
