= 2019–20 Maccabi Haifa F.C. season =

Maccabi Haifa
2019–20 season
- President: Ya'akov Shahar
- Head coach: Marco Balbul
- Stadium: Sammy Ofer
- Ligat Ha'Al: 2nd
- State Cup: Quarter-finals
- Toto Cup: 7th
- Europa League: Second qualifying round
- Top goalscorer: League: Nikita Rukavytsya (22); All: Nikita Rukavytsya (24)
- Highest home attendance: 30,701 (vs Maccabi Tel Aviv, 6 January 2020)
- Lowest home attendance: 4,137 (vs Hapoel Be'er Sheva, 21 July 2019)
- Average home league attendance: 19,407
Home colours	Away colours	Third colours

The 2019–20 season is Maccabi Haifa's 62nd season in Israeli Premier League, and their 38th consecutive season in the top division of Israeli football.

== Club ==
=== Squad information ===
N	Pos.	Nat.	Name	Age	EU	Since	App	Goals	Ends	Transfer fee	Notes
2	DF	(Israel)	Yonatan Levi	22	Non-EU	2016/2017	20	0	2019/2020	Youth system	
3	DF	(Nigeria)	Ikouwem Utin	26	Non-EU	2019/2020	10	0	2022/2023	120,000€	
4	DF	(Australia)	Trent Sainsbury	34	Non-EU	2019/2020	33	2	2020/2021	Free	Second nationality:England
5	DF	(Israel)	Rami Gershon	37	Non-EU	2017/2018	56	0	2021/2022	400,000€	
6	MF	(Israel)	Neta Lavi (captain)	29	Non-EU	2015/2016	164	7	2022/2023	Youth system	
7	MF	(Israel)	Sintayehu Sallalich	34	Non-EU	2017/2018	107	16	2019/2020	Free	
8	MF	(Israel)	Dolev Haziza	32	Non-EU	2019/2020	44	7	2022/2023	310,000€	Second nationality:Franch
9	FW	(Israel)	Mohammed Awaed	29	Non-EU	2014/2015	99	18	2020/2021	Youth system	
10	MF	(Netherlands)	Tjaronn Chery	37	EU	2019/2020	40	10	2021/2022	Free	Second nationality:Suriname
11	FW	(Israel)	Yarden Shua	26	Non-EU	2018/2019	42	7	2023/2024	1,400,000€	
12	DF	(Israel)	Sun Menahem	32	Non-EU	2016/2017	115	4	2020/2021	Free	
13	FW	(Australia)	Nikita Rukavytsya	31	EU	2016/2017	156	59	2020/2021	400,000€	Second nationality:Israel
15	DF	(Israel)	Ofri Arad	27	EU	2018/2019	64	4	2023/2024	Youth system	Second nationality: Germany
18	MF	(Israel)	Yuval Ashkenazi	33	Non-EU	2019/2020	34	11	2020/2021	310,000€	
21	DF	(Israel)	Ayid Habshi (vice captain)	31	Non-EU	2012/2013	97	1	2023/20204	Youth system	
22	GK	(Israel)	Gil Ofek	32	Non-EU	2015/2016	2	0	2019/2020	Free	Originally from youth system
25	DF	(Israel)	Raz Meir	30	Non-EU	2017/2018	69	3	2020/2021	Free	Originally from youth system
26	DF	(Cameroon)	Ernest Mabouka	37	Non-EU	2017/2018	115	1	2020/2021	€300,000	
27	MF	(Israel)	Maxim Plakuschenko	30	EU	2018/2019	51	2	2021/2022	€420,000	Second nationality:Ukraine
29	MF	(Israel)	Suf Podgoreanu	24	EU	2019/2020	5	0	2019/2020	Youth system	Second nationality:Romania
30	FW	(Netherlands)	Yanic Wildschut	34	EU	2019/2020	38	0	2020/2021	Free	
33	MF	(Israel)	Maor Levi	25	Non-EU	2019/2020	5	0	2023/2024	Youth system	
36	FW	(Israel)	Stav Nahmani	23	Non-EU	2019/2020	1	0	2023/2024	Youth system	
44	GK	(United States)	Josh Cohen	33	Non-EU	2019/2020	34	0	2020/2021	Free	
55	GK	(Israel)	Guy Haimov	40	Non-EU	2018/2019	49	0	2019/2020	Free	
94	GK	(United States)	Joe Kuzminsky	32	Non-EU	2019/2020	0	0	2019/2020	Free	Second nationality:Israel

- Last updated: 8 July 2020
- Source: mhaifafc.com, Israel Football Association, UEFA Players transfer,
- Ordered by squad number.

=== Current coaching staff ===
Position	Staff
Head coach	(Israel) Marco Balbul
Assistant Coach	(Israel) Gal Alberman
Assistant Coach	(England) Paul Groves
Club Administrator	(Israel) Rafi Osmo
Fitness Coach	(Israel) Uri Harel
Fitness Coach	(England) Dr. Neil Clarke
Goalkeeping Coach	(Israel) Giora Antman
Analyst	(Israel) Idan Yona
Club doctor	(Israel) Dr. Ami Berber
Physiotherapist	(Israel) Sergei Kotov
Logistic	(Israel) Shlomi Elimelech
Logistic	(Israel) Shay Bar
Scout	(Israel) Alon Harazi
Development Manager Mental	(Croatia) Giovanni Rosso

Last updated: 10 July 2019
Source: F.C. Maccabi Haifa Official Website

=== Kits ===
- Provider: Nike
- Main Sponsor: Volvo
- Secondary Sponsor: Traffilog, Variety Israel and Hertz

Home	Away	Third colours	GK	GK 2

== Transfers ==
=== In ===
Date	Pos.	Player	Age	Moving from	Type	Fee	Notes	Source
31 January 2019	FW	(Israel) Gil Itzhak	25	(Israel) Hapoel Rishon LeZion	Transfer	Free		
27 May 2019	DF	(Israel) Shay Ben David	21	(Israel) Hapoel Afula	Loan returns	Free		
27 May 2019	MF	(Israel) Eitan Velblum	21	(Israel) Hapoel Nof HaGalil	Loan returns	Free		
27 May 2019	DF	(Israel) Yahav Gurfinkel	20	(Israel) Hapoel Hadera	Loan returns	Free		
27 May 2019	DF	(Nigeria) Ikouwem Utin	19	(Nigeria) Enyimba International	Transfer	120,000€		
27 May 2019	MF	(The Gambia) Saikou Touray	25	(Israel) Beitar Tubruk	Transfer	180,000€		
20 June 2019	MF	(Israel) Yuval Ashkenazi	33	(Israel) Bnei Yehuda Tel Aviv	Transfer	310,000€		
20 June 2019	MF	(Israel) Dolev Haziza	32	(Israel) Bnei Yehuda Tel Aviv	Transfer	310,000€		
5 July 2019	MF	(Netherlands) Yanic Wildschut	34	(England) Norwich City	Transfer	Free		
19 July 2019	GK	(United States) (Israel) Josh Cohen	33	(United States) Sacramento Republic	Transfer	Free		
8 August 2019	MF	(Netherlands) Tjaronn Chery	37	(China) Guizhou Hengfeng	Transfer	Free		
29 August 2019	DF	(Australia) Trent Sainsbury	34	(Netherlands) PSV Eindhoven	Transfer	Free		
29 August 2019	MF	(Cameroon) Jeando Fuchs	26	(Spain) Deportivo Alavés	Loan in	Free		
22 January 2020	DF	(Spain) Lillo	37	(Spain) CA Osasuna	Transfer	Free		
28 January 2020	GK	(United States) (Israel) Joe Kuzminsky	32	(United States) Charleston Battery	Loan in	Free		
3 February 2020	DF	(Israel) Yonatan Levi	28	(Israel) Sektzia Nes Tziona	Loan returns	Free		

=== Out ===
Date	Pos.	Player	Age	Type	Fee	Moving to	Notes	Source
27 May 2019	DF	(Netherlands) Etiënne Reijnen	39	Release	Free	(Netherlands) Zwolle		
6 June 2019	MF	(Israel) Gal Alberman	43	Retired				
19 June 2019	MF	(Israel) Roi Kahat	34	Release	Free	(Israel) Maccabi Netanya		
20 June 2019	FW	(Israel) Shon Weissman	29	Release	Free	(Austria) Wolfsberger AC		
20 June 2019	MF	(Israel) Eitan Velblum	28	Loan out	Free	(Israel) Bnei Yehuda Tel Aviv		
20 June 2019	MF	(Israel) Amit Zenati	29	Loan out	Free	(Israel) Bnei Yehuda Tel Aviv		
1 July 2019	MF	(Cameroon) Georges Mandjeck	38	End of Loan	Free	(Czech Republic) Sparta Prague		
1 July 2019	MF	(Turkey) Kerim Frei	32	End of Loan	Free	(Turkey) Başakşehir		
19 July 2019	GK	(Israel) Omri Glazer	30	Loan out	Free	(Israel) Sektzia Nes Tziona		
12 August 2019	MF	(The Gambia) Saikou Touray	25	Loan out	Free	(Israel) Sektzia Nes Tziona		
5 September 2019	FW	(Israel) Gil Itzhak	32	Loan out	Free	(Israel) Hapoel Rishon LeZion		
12 September 2019	DF	(Israel) Yahav Gurfinkel	27	Loan out	Free	(Israel) Hapoel Hadera		
17 September 2019	DF	(Brazil) Allyson	35	Release	Free	(Israel) Bnei Yehuda Tel Aviv		
18 September 2019	MF	(Israel) Mohammad Abu Fani	28	Loan out	Free	(Israel) Hapoel Hadera		
27 January 2020	MF	(Cameroon) Jeando Fuchs	26	Release	Free	(Spain) Deportivo Alavés		
28 January 2020	DF	(Israel) Shay Ben David	28	Loan out	Free	(Italy) Trapani		
22 May 2020	DF	(Spain) Lillo	37	Release	Free	Free		

== Pre-season and friendlies ==
Win Draw Loss Postponed

29 June 2019 Training Camp	Maccabi Haifa (Israel)	3 - 0	(Belgium) Beveren	Mierlo, Netherlands
20:00 IST	Ashkenazi 13'; Shua 63'; Lavi 68'	Report

2 July 2019 Training Camp	Maccabi Haifa (Israel)	0 - 0	(Belgium) Sint-Truidense	Mierlo, Netherlands
19:00 IST		Report

10 August 2019	Maccabi Haifa	4 – 0	Hapoel Ironi Baqa al-Gharbiyye	Kfar Galim Training Ground
	Awaed, Rukavytsya	[ Report]

24 November 2019	Maccabi Haifa	4 – 0	Hapoel Acre	Kfar Galim Training Ground
	Awaed 20'; Sintayehu Sallalich 33'; Yarden Shua 40' (pen.)	[ Report]

19 May 2020	Maccabi Haifa	3 – 2	Hapoel Nof HaGalil
	Chery; Suf Podgoreanu 80'; Stav Nahmani 89'	[ Report]	Guy Dahan 8'; Ryan Ashmuz 87'

23 May 2020	Maccabi Haifa	1 - 1	Hapoel Umm al-Fahm
17:30	Ernest Mabouka 10'	[ Report]	Ezat Khalaila 70'	Referee: Erez Papir

== Competitions ==
=== Overview ===
Competition	Started round	Current position / round	Final position / round	First match	Last match	Record						
Competition	Started round	Current position / round	Final position / round	First match	Last match	G	W	D	L	GF	GA	GD
Ligat Ha'Al	Matchday 1	-	2nd	24 August 2019	7 July 2020	36	22	7	7	73	32	+41
State Cup	Eighth Round	-	Quarter-Final	21 December 2019	10 March 2020	2	2	0	1	5	3	+2
Toto Cup	UEFA qualifiers match	-	7th	21 July 2019	17 August 2019	2	1	0	1	2	2	0
UEFA Europa League	First qualifying round	-	Second qualifying round	11 July 2018	1 August 2019	4	3	0	1	8	6	2+

Updated as of 8 July 2020

== Ligat Ha'Al ==
=== Regular season ===
Win Draw Loss

24 August 2019 1	Maccabi Haifa	4-3	Hapoel Ra'anana	Haifa
18:00	Ashkenazi 36'; Mabouka (yellow card) 37'; Awaed (yellow card) 39'; Habshi 45+3', (yellow card) 64'; Rukavytsya 84', 88'; Raz Meir (yellow card) 90+2'	Report	Or Dasa 5', 26'; Nimni 65' (pen.); Yadin (yellow card) 90'	Stadium: Sammy Ofer Stadium; Attendance: 17,632; Referee: David Foxman

31 August 2019 2	Hapoel Haifa	0-0	Maccabi Haifa	Haifa
20:30	Júnior (yellow card) 24'; Burić (yellow card) 42'; Serdal (yellow card) 52'	Report	Rukavytsya (yellow card) 42'; Ashkenazi (yellow card) 42'; Habshi (yellow card) 71'	Stadium: Sammy Ofer Stadium; Attendance: 23,000; Referee: Ziv Adler

14 September 2019 3	Maccabi Haifa	2-0	Ironi Kiryat Shmona	Haifa
18:00	Habshi (yellow card) 41'; Rukavytsya 49'; Ashkenazi 75'	Report	Yuval Levin (yellow card) 10'	Stadium: Sammy Ofer Stadium; Attendance: 18,124; Referee: Idan Leiba

21 September 2019 4	Maccabi Tel Aviv	1-0	Maccabi Haifa	Tel Aviv
20:30	Sainsbury 37' (o.g); Micha (yellow card) 45+3'; Shachar Piven (yellow card) 59'; Shechter (yellow card) 82'; Ofoedu (yellow card) 84'	Report	Habshi (yellow card) 13'; Shua (yellow card) 45+3'; Plakuschenko (yellow card) 78'; Menahem (yellow card) 84'	Stadium: Bloomfield Stadium; Attendance: 26,234; Referee: Orel Grinfeld

25 September 2019 5	Maccabi Haifa	3-0	Maccabi Netanya	Haifa
20:15	Rukavytsya 21'; Menahem 42'; Haziza 65'	Report	Avraham (yellow card) 37'; Herrera (yellow card) 40'; Dolev Azulay (yellow card) 71'; Finish (yellow card) 80'; Kanichowsky (yellow card) 81'	Stadium: Sammy Ofer Stadium; Attendance: 15,173; Referee: Roi Reinshreiber

5 October 2019 6	Sektzia Nes Tziona	0-3	Maccabi Haifa	Petah Tikva
19:00	Itay Ozeri (yellow card) 20'; Elias (yellow card) 26'	Report	Haziza (yellow card) 25', (goal) 79'; Rukavytsya (yellow card) 56', (goal) 65'; Awaed 81'	Stadium: HaMoshava Stadium; Attendance: 10,800; Referee: Erez Papir

21 October 2019 7	Maccabi Haifa	1-1	Bnei Yehuda	Haifa
20:15	Ashkenazi (yellow card) 34'; Arad (yellow card) 48'; Menahem (yellow card) 67'; Chery 69'; Fuchs (yellow card) 90+1'	Report	Ghadir (yellow card) 30'; Pnishi (yellow card) 33'; Ljujić 83'; Zubas (yellow card) 90'	Stadium: Sammy Ofer Stadium; Attendance: 24,277; Referee: Liran Liany

26 October 2019 8	Hapoel Kfar Saba	0-3	Maccabi Haifa	Petah Tikva
20:30	Gamon (yellow card) 59'; Zhairi (yellow card) 61'; Koffie (red card) 67'	Report	Chery 30', 90'; Lavi (yellow card) 81'; Awaed 90+3'	Stadium: HaMoshava Stadium; Attendance: 7,000; Referee: Eitan Shemeulevitch

4 November 2019 9	Hapoel Tel Aviv	1-2	Maccabi Haifa	Tel Aviv
20:15	Abu Abaid (yellow card) 7'; Altman 37', (yellow card) 47'	Report	Arad (yellow card) 22'; Haziza 50', (yellow card) 90+3'; Mabouka 90+2', (yellow card) 90+3'	Stadium: Bloomfield Stadium; Attendance: 19,000; Referee: Daniel Bar Natan

10 November 2019 10	Maccabi Haifa	3-1	Beitar Jerusalem	Haifa
20:15	Haziza 49'; Wildschut (yellow card) 57'; Rukavytsya 80'; Chery 90+8' (pen.)	Report	Azulay 18', (yellow card) 44'; Verdasca (yellow card) 31'; Or Zehavi (yellow card) 90+7'	Stadium: Sammy Ofer Stadium; Attendance: 29,032; Referee: David Foxman

1 December 2019 11	Hapoel Hadera	0-3	Maccabi Haifa	Netanya
20:00	Dia Lababidi (yellow card) 7'; Hassan (yellow card) 10'; Goldenberg (yellow card) 34'	Report	Chery 13'; Rukavytsya 27'; Arad (yellow card) 59'; Shua 87', (yellow card) 88'; Lavi (yellow card) 89'	Stadium: Netanya Stadium; Attendance: 8,500; Referee: Eli Hacmon

4 December 2019 12	Maccabi Haifa	3-3	F.C. Ashdod	Haifa
20:10	Wildschut 47'; Ashkenazi 58'; Mabouka (yellow card) 67'; Arad 90+2', (yellow card) 90+3'	Report	Asefa (yellow card) 17'; David 40'; Fares Abu Akel (yellow card) 48'; Roei Mishpati (yellow card) 60'; Azulay 76' (pen.), (yellow card) 90+3'; Leonard Owusu 85'	Stadium: Sammy Ofer Stadium; Attendance: 16,157; Referee: Snir Levi

9 December 2019 13	Hapoel Be'er Sheva	0-2	Maccabi Haifa	Be'er Sheva
20:15	Taha (yellow card) 30'; Josué (yellow card) 70'	Report	Lavi 7', (yellow card) 66'; Haziza (yellow card) 30'; Menahem (yellow card) 40'; Chery 45+1', (yellow card) 69'; Mabouka (yellow card) 72'; Plakuschenko (yellow card) 78'; Arad (yellow card) 79'; Sainsbury (yellow card) 80'	Stadium: Terner Stadium; Attendance: 14,297; Referee: Roi Reinshreiber

14 December 2019 14	Hapoel Ra'anana	0-0	Maccabi Haifa	Petah Tikva
19:50	Assaf Tzur (yellow card) 80'	Report	Haziza (yellow card) 17'	Stadium: HaMoshava Stadium; Attendance: 7,512; Referee: Gal Leibovich

24 December 2019 15	Maccabi Haifa	3-0	Hapoel Haifa	Haifa
20:15	Ashkenazi 46'; Rukavytsya 53', 56'; Lavi (yellow card) 60'; Shua (yellow card) 87'	Report	Serdal (yellow card) 75'	Stadium: Sammy Ofer Stadium; Attendance: 28,177; Referee: Liran Liany

29 December 2019 16	Ironi Kiryat Shmona	1-2	Maccabi Haifa	Kiryat Shmona
17:30	Yoel Abuhatzira (yellow card) 17'; Abdalla Halil 90+4'	Report	Ashkenazi 26'; Lavi (yellow card) 36'; Rukavytsya 90+2'	Stadium: Kiryat Shmona Stadium; Attendance: 2,700; Referee: Orel Grinfeld

6 January 2020 17	Maccabi Haifa	3-4	Maccabi Tel Aviv	Haifa
20:15	Sallalich (yellow card) 56'; Rukavytsya 60'; Wildschut 62'; Awaed 87'	Report	Rikan (yellow card) 5', (goal) 14'; Glazer (yellow card) 26'; Golasa 48'; Cohen (penalty missed) 69 69', 90+3', (yellow card) 90+3'; Tenenbaum (yellow card) 80'; Atzili (yellow card) 81'	Stadium: Sammy Ofer Stadium; Attendance: 30,701; Referee: Liran Liany

11 January 2020 18	Maccabi Netanya	0-2	Maccabi Haifa	Netanya
19:50	Kahlon (yellow card) 21'	Report	Habshi (yellow card) 46'; Rukavytsya 56'; Ashkenazi 65'	Stadium: Netanya Stadium; Attendance: 9,364; Referee: Daniel Bar Natan

18 January 2020 19	Maccabi Haifa	4-0	Sektzia Nes Tziona	Haifa
17:30	Sainsbury 52', 63'; Rukavytsya 71'; Shua (yellow card) 82'; Arad 90'	Report	Elias (red card) 17'; Ofek Bitton (yellow card) 39'	Stadium: Sammy Ofer Stadium; Attendance: 18,253; Referee: Eitan Shemeulevitch

27 January 2020 20	Bnei Yehuda	1-3	Maccabi Haifa	Tel Aviv
20:15	Sagas Tambi (yellow card) 63'; Ariel Lazmi 82'	Report	Baltaxa 27' (o.g.); Ashkenazi 31'; Mabouka 42'; Arad (yellow card) 68'; Rukavytsya 90+2'	Stadium: Bloomfield Stadium; Attendance: 8,778; Referee: Erez Papir

1 February 2020 21	Maccabi Haifa	0-1	Hapoel Kfar Saba	Haifa
17:30	Lillo (yellow card) 36'	Report	Sagi Dror (yellow card) 1'; Fadida 90+7'	Stadium: Sammy Ofer Stadium; Attendance: 19,979; Referee: David Foxman

4 February 2020 22	Maccabi Haifa	5-0	Hapoel Tel Aviv	Haifa
20:15	Lavi 4'; Rukavytsya 8'; Sainsbury 35'; Wildschut 47'; Awaed (yellow card) 74'; Chery 81'	Report	Peersman (yellow card) 56'	Stadium: Sammy Ofer Stadium; Attendance: 21,594; Referee: Shalom Ben Avraham

10 February 2020 23	Beitar Jerusalem	2-0	Maccabi Haifa	Jerusalem
20:15	Atar 26' (pen.); Kriaf (yellow card) 31'; Plumain 90+4', 90+5'	Report	Chery (penalty missed) 37; Lavi (yellow card) 45'; Haziza (yellow card) 77'; Arad (yellow card) 90'	Stadium: Teddy Stadium; Attendance: 19,000; Referee: Roi Reinshreiber

15 February 2020 24	Maccabi Haifa	1-0	Hapoel Hadera	Haifa
19:50	Lavi (yellow card) 24'; Rukavytsya 72'; Haziza (yellow card) 90+4'	Report	Dia Lababidi (yellow card) 22' (yellow-red card) 27'; Solomon Daniel (yellow card) 75'; Abu Fani (yellow card) 81'	Stadium: Sammy Ofer Stadium; Attendance: 17,357; Referee: Nael Odeh

22 February 2020 25	F.C. Ashdod	1-2	Maccabi Haifa	Ashdod
17:30	Tiram (yellow card) 4'; Samuel Alabi (yellow card) 27'; Yehezkel 28'; Fares Abu Akel (yellow card) 45'	Report	Rukavytsya 23'; Wildschut 53'; Sallalich (yellow card) 85'; Arad (yellow card) 90+2'	Stadium: Yud-Alef Stadium; Attendance: 5,500; Referee: Erez Papir

1 March 2020 26	Maccabi Haifa	4-0	Hapoel Be'er Sheva	Netanya
20:15	Rukavytsya 15'; Chery 18'; Menahem (yellow card) 36'; Sainsbury (yellow card) 49'; Wildschut 57'; Ashkenazi (yellow card) 66'; Haziza 82'; Lavi (yellow card) 88'	Report	Simão (yellow card) 71'; Josué (yellow card) 72'	Stadium: Netanya Stadium; Attendance: 11,036; Referee: Eitan Shemeulevitch

==== Regular season table ====
Pos	Team	Pld	W	D	L	GF	GA	GD	Pts	Qualification or relegation
1	Maccabi Tel Aviv	26	19	7	0	48	7	+41	64	Qualification for the Championship round
2	Maccabi Haifa	26	18	4	4	58	20	+38	58	Qualification for the Championship round
3	Beitar Jerusalem	26	15	4	7	42	25	+17	49	Qualification for the Championship round
4	Hapoel Be'er Sheva	26	13	5	8	33	23	+10	44	Qualification for the Championship round
5	Hapoel Tel Aviv	26	11	5	10	24	36	−12	38	Qualification for the Championship round

Updated to match(es) played on unknown. Source: Soccerway
Rules for classification: 1) Points; 2) Goal difference; 3) Matches won; 4) Goals scored; 5) Head-to-head points; 6) Head-to-head goal difference; 7) Head-to-head goals scored; 8) Play-off.

==== Results overview ====
Win Draw Loss

Opposition	Home score	Away score
Beitar Jerusalem	3-1	0-2
Bnei Yehuda Tel Aviv	1-1	3-1
F.C. Ashdod	3-3	2-1
Hapoel Be'er Sheva	4-0	2-0
Hapoel Hadera	1-0	3-0
Hapoel Haifa	3-0	0-0
Hapoel Kfar Saba	0-1	3-0
Hapoel Ra'anana	4-3	0-0
Hapoel Tel Aviv	5-0	2-1
Ironi Kiryat Shmona	2-0	2-1
Maccabi Netanya	3-0	2-0
Maccabi Tel Aviv	3-4	0-1
Sektzia Nes Tziona	4-0	3-0

=== Play-off ===
30 May 2020 27	Maccabi Haifa	1-2	Hapoel Tel Aviv	Haifa
21:00	Sallalich (yellow card) 28'; Gershon (yellow card) 40'; Habshi (yellow card) 47'; Plakuschenko 80'	Report	Barshazki 14'; Olaha (yellow card) 19'; Damari 69'; Abbade Farhat (yellow card) 90+4'	Stadium: Sammy Ofer Stadium; Attendance: 0 Referee: Gal Leibovich
Note: originally scheduled for 7 March 2020 due to the COVID-19 pandemic in Israel The league was postponed indefinitely, the league resumed at 6 May 2020; The match was played behind closed doors due to the 2020 coronavirus pandemic

3 June 2020 28	Maccabi Tel Aviv	2-0	Maccabi Haifa	Tel Aviv
20:45	Eyal Golasa 18'; Shechter (yellow card) 55'; Hozez 86'; Atzili (yellow card) 88'	Report	Plakuschenko (yellow card) 25'; Chery (yellow card) 32'; Lavi (yellow card) 49' (yellow-red card) 82'; Haziza (yellow card) 88'	Stadium: Bloomfield Stadium; Attendance: 0 Referee: Roi Reinshreiber
Note: originally scheduled for 16 March 2020 due to the COVID-19 pandemic in Israel The league was postponed indefinitely, the league resumed at 6 May 2020; The match was played behind closed doors due to the 2020 coronavirus pandemic

7 June 2020 29	Maccabi Haifa	2-2	Hapoel Haifa	Haifa
21:00	Rukavytsya 26'; Awaed 85'; Mabouka (yellow card) 90+4'	Report	Mishpati (yellow card) 48'; Serdal 54'; Zamir (yellow card) 69'; Sa'ar Fadida (yellow card) 71'; Arel 90+5' (pen.)	Stadium: Sammy Ofer Stadium; Attendance: 0 Referee: Eitan Shemeulevitch
Note: originally scheduled for 4 April 2020 due to the COVID-19 pandemic in Israel The league was postponed indefinitely, the league resumed at 6 May 2020; The match was played behind closed doors due to the 2020 coronavirus pandemic

13 June 2020 30	Maccabi Haifa	0-0	Beitar Jerusalem	Haifa
21:00	Haziza (yellow card) 46'	Report	Plumain (yellow card) 28'; Vered (yellow card) 74'	Stadium: Sammy Ofer Stadium; Attendance: 0 Referee: Idan Leiba
Note: originally scheduled for 11 April 2020 due to the COVID-19 pandemic in Israel The league was postponed indefinitely, the league resumed at 6 May 2020; The match was played behind closed doors due to the 2020 coronavirus pandemic

20 June 2020 31	Hapoel Be'er Sheva	0-1	Maccabi Haifa	Ashdod
20:30	Tzedek (yellow card) 49'	Report	Chery (penalty missed) 50; Sallalich 77'; Lavi (yellow card) 90+1'	Stadium: Yud-Alef Stadium; Attendance: 0 Referee: Eli Hacmon
Note: originally scheduled for 18 April 2020 due to the COVID-19 pandemic in Israel The league was postponed indefinitely, the league resumed at 6 May 2020

23 June 2020 32	Hapoel Tel Aviv	1-3	Maccabi Haifa	Tel Aviv
21:00	Amit Meir (yellow card) 60'; Damari (penalty missed) 90+1; Gruper 90+1'	Report	Sallalich 3'; Chery 43'; Awaed 76'; Lavi (yellow card) 85'; Sainsbury (yellow card) 90'	Stadium: Bloomfield Stadium; Attendance: 0 Referee: Shalom Ben Avraham
Note: originally scheduled for 25 April 2020 due to the COVID-19 pandemic in Israel The league was postponed indefinitely, the league resumed at 6 May 2020

27 June 2020 33	Maccabi Haifa	2-1	Hapoel Be'er Sheva	Haifa
20:45	Rukavytsya 13'; Haziza (yellow card) 37'; Sallalich 61'; Menahem (yellow card) 64'; Arad (yellow card) 67'	Report	Biton (yellow card) 15' (yellow-red card) 17'; Simão (yellow card) 35'; Vítor (yellow card) 41'; Sahar 48'	Stadium: Sammy Ofer Stadium; Attendance: 0 Referee: Orel Grinfeld
Note: originally scheduled for 2 May 2020 due to the COVID-19 pandemic in Israel The league was postponed indefinitely, the league resumed at 6 May 2020

1 July 2020 34	Hapoel Haifa	1-4	Maccabi Haifa	Haifa
20:30	Arel (yellow card) 45'; Sylvestr 70'	Report	Rukavytsya 3', 23'; Sallalich 9', 25'	Stadium: Sammy Ofer Stadium; Attendance: 0 Referee: Idan Leiba
Note: originally scheduled for 9 May 2020 due to the COVID-19 pandemic in Israel The league was postponed indefinitely, the league resumed at 6 May 2020

4 July 2020 35	Maccabi Haifa	0-1	Maccabi Tel Aviv	Haifa
21:00	Plakuschenko (yellow card) 24'; Sainsbury (yellow card) 36'	Report	Saborit 24'; Eylon Almog (yellow card) 51'	Stadium: Sammy Ofer Stadium; Attendance: 0 Referee: Igal Frid
Note: originally scheduled for 16 May 2020 due to the COVID-19 pandemic in Israel The league was postponed indefinitely, the league resumed at 6 May 2020

7 July 2020 36	Beitar Jerusalem	2-2	Maccabi Haifa	Jerusalem
21:00	Vered 49'; Tamir Adi (yellow card) 62'; Azulay 66'	Report	Chery 13'; Lavi (yellow card) 64'; Haziza 78'; Arad (yellow card) 90'	Stadium: Teddy Stadium; Attendance: 0 Referee: Ohad Assulin
Note: originally scheduled for 23 May 2020 due to the COVID-19 pandemic in Israel The league was postponed indefinitely, the league resumed at 6 May 2020

==== Championship round table ====
Pos	Team	Pld	W	D	L	GF	GA	GD	Pts	Qualification
1	Maccabi Tel Aviv (C)	36	26	9	1	63	10	+53	87	Qualification for the Champions League first qualifying round
2	Maccabi Haifa	36	22	7	7	73	32	+41	73	Qualification for the Europa League first qualifying round
3	Beitar Jerusalem	36	16	11	9	51	35	+16	59	Qualification for the Europa League first qualifying round
4	Hapoel Be'er Sheva (Note: Qualified due to winning the 2019–20 Israel State Cup)	36	15	10	11	44	33	+11	55	Qualification for the Europa League first qualifying round
5	Hapoel Tel Aviv	36	14	6	16	31	55	−24	48	Can't qualify for international competitions
6	Hapoel Haifa	36	12	11	13	39	46	−7	47	

Source: Israel Football Association, Soccerway
Rules for classification: 1) Points; 2) Goal difference; 3) Matches won; 4) Goals scored; 5) Head-to-head points; 6) Head-to-head goal difference; 7) Head-to-head goals scored; 8) Play-off.
(C) Champions

==== Results overview ====
Win Draw Loss

Opposition	Home score	Away score
Beitar Jerusalem	0-0	2-2
Hapoel Be'er Sheva	2-1	1-0
Hapoel Haifa	2-2	4-1
Hapoel Tel Aviv	1-2	3-1
Maccabi Tel Aviv	0-1	0-2

=== Results summary ===
Overall								Home						Away					
Pld	W	D	L	GF	GA	GD	Pts	W	D	L	GF	GA	GD	W	D	L	GF	GA	GD
36	22	7	7	73	32	+41	73	10	4	4	41	19	+22	12	3	3	32	13	+19

Last updated: 8 July 2020.
Source: Competitive matches

=== Results by round ===
Round	1	2	3	4	5	6	7	8	9	10	11	12	13	14	15	16	17	18	19	20	21	22	23	24	25	26	27	28	29	30	31	32	33	34	35	36
Ground	H	A	H	A	H	A	H	A	A	H	A	H	A	A	H	A	H	A	H	A	H	H	A	H	A	H	H	A	H	H	A	A	H	A	H	A
Result	W	D	W	L	W	W	D	W	W	W	W	D	W	D	W	W	L	W	W	W	L	W	L	W	W	W	L	L	D	D	W	W	W	W	L	D
Position	2	4	1	5	3	3	3	2	2	2	2	2	2	2	2	2	2	2	2	2	2	2	2	2	2	2	2	2	2	2	2	2	2	2	2	2

Updated to match(es) played on 8 July 2020. Source: Competitive Matches
A = Away; H = Home; W = Win; D = Draw; L = Loss

== State Cup ==
=== Round of 32 ===
21 December 2019 Round of 32	Maccabi Haifa	3-1 (a.e.t.)	Sektzia Nes Tziona	Haifa
15:00	Ashkenazi 45'; Menahem (yellow card) 59'; Haziza 112', 120'	Report	Elad Shahaf (yellow card) 22'; Itay Ozeri (yellow card) 23'; Mizrahi (yellow card) 35'; Osher Abu 71'; Noam Cohen (yellow card) 77'; Ramaric Etou (yellow card) 10'	Stadium: Sammy Ofer Stadium; Attendance: 11,247; Referee: Sahlom Ben-Avraham

=== Round of 16 ===
14 January 2020 Round of 16	Hapoel Umm al-Fahm	0-1	Maccabi Haifa	Afula
19:20	Mohammed Jabarin (yellow card) 44'; Nadav Muniss (yellow card) 56'	Report	Awaed (yellow card) 54'; Shua 57', (yellow card) 71'; Plakuschenko (yellow card) 87'	Stadium: Afula Illit Stadium; Attendance: 3,000; Referee: Ziv Adler

=== Quarter-final ===
9 March 2020 Quarter-final	Maccabi Haifa	1-2	Hapoel Be'er Sheva	Haifa
	Arad 22', (yellow card) 68'; Sallalich (yellow card) 90'; Chery (yellow card) 90'	[ Report]	Vítor 35'; Tzedek; Sahar 68'; Kabha (yellow card) 83'	Stadium: Sammy Ofer Stadium; Referee: Ziv Adler
Note: The match was played behind closed doors due to the 2020 coronavirus pandemic.

== Toto Cup ==
=== UEFA qualifiers match ===
21 July 2019 UEFA qualifiers match	Maccabi Haifa	0 - 1	Hapoel Be'er Sheva	Haifa
20:30	Itzhak (yellow card) 66'; Haziza (yellow card) 83'; Abu Fani (yellow card) 90+4'; Maor Levi (yellow card) 90+5'	Report	Zrihan 19' (pen.); Yosefi (yellow card) 23' (yellow-red card) 62'; Levi (yellow card) 34' (yellow-red card) 55'	Stadium: Sammy Ofer Stadium; Attendance: 4,137; Referee: Orel Grinfeld

=== 7-8th classification match ===
17 August 2019 7-8th classification match	Maccabi Netanya	1 - 2	Maccabi Haifa	Netanya
20:30	Dolev Azulay (yellow card) 80'; Kanichowsky (yellow card) 81', (goal) 89'	Report	Rukavytsya 20'; Arad (yellow card) 52'; Raz Meir 90+4'	Stadium: Netanya Stadium; Attendance: 3,500; Referee: Gal Leibovich

== UEFA Europa League ==
=== First qualifying round ===
11 July 2018 First leg	Maccabi Haifa (Israel)	2 - 0	(Slovenia) Mura	Haifa
20:00 IDT	Ashkenazi 64'; Awaed 67'	Report	Cipot (yellow card) 82'	Stadium: Sammy Ofer Stadium; Attendance: 16,126; Referee: (Lithuania) Manfredas Lukjancukas

18 July 2018 Second leg	Mura (Slovenia)	2 - 3 (5-2 agg.)	(Israel) Maccabi Haifa	Murska Sobota
21:00 IDT	Bobičanec 6'; Maroša (yellow card) 73'; Šporn 81'	Report	Awaed 32'; Ashkenazi 35', 76'; Shua (yellow card) 86'	Stadium: Fazanerija City Stadium; Referee: (Poland) Tomasz Musiał

=== Second qualifying round ===
25 July 2018 First leg	Strasbourg (France)	3 - 1	(Israel) Maccabi Haifa	Strasbourg
22:00 IDT	Ajorque 45' (pen.); Aaneba (yellow card) 45+2'; Thomasson 47'; Martin 61'	Report	Plakuschenko 39'; Habshi (red card) 44'; Arad (yellow card) 87'	Stadium: Stade de la Meinau; Attendance: 20,637; Referee: (Netherlands) Kevin Blom

1 August 2019 Second leg	Maccabi Haifa (Israel)	2 - 1 (3 - 4 agg.)	(France) Strasbourg	Haifa
20:00 IDT	Menahem (yellow card) 21'; Shua 25'; Rukavytsya 40'	Report	Ajorque 17'	Stadium: Sammy Ofer Stadium; Attendance: 23,082; Referee: (Italy) Maurizio Mariani

== Statistics ==
=== Squad statistics ===
Updated on 18 July 2020

			Ligat Ha'Al					State Cup					Toto Cup					UEFA Europa League					Total				
Nation	No.	Name		GS	Min.	Goal	Assist		GS	Min.	Goal	Assist		GS	Min.	Goal	Assist		GS	Min.	Goal	Assist		GS	Min.	Goal	Assist
Goalkeepers
(Israel)	22	Gil Ofek	0	0	0	0	0	0	0	0	0	0	0	0	0	0	0	0	0	0	0	0	0	0	0	0	0
(Israel) (United States)	44	Josh Cohen	31	30	2,969	0	0	3	3	320	0	0	0	0	0	0	0	0	0	0	0	0	34	33	3,289	0	0
(Israel)	55	Guy Haimov	6	6	534	0	0	0	0	0	0	0	2	2	195	0	0	4	4	391	0	0	12	12	1,120	0	0
(Israel) (United States)	94	Joe Kuzminsky	0	0	0	0	0	0	0	0	0	0	0	0	0	0	0	0	0	0	0	0	0	0	0	0	0
Defenders
(Israel)	2	Yonatan Levi	0	0	0	0	0	0	0	0	0	0	0	0	0	0	0	0	0	0	0	0	0	0	0	0	0
(Nigeria)	3	Ikouwem Utin	7	1	206	0	0	1	0	16	0	0	1	1	48	0	0	1	1	97	0	0	10	3	367	0	0
(Australia)	4	Trent Sainsbury	31	30	2,799	2	0	2	2	224	0	0	0	0	0	0	0	0	0	0	0	0	33	32	3,023	2	0
(Israel)	5	Rami Gershon	4	1	215	0	0	0	0	0	0	0	0	0	0	0	0	4	4	391	0	0	8	5	606	0	0
(Israel)	12	Sun Menahem	33	33	2,913	1	2	3	3	320	0	2	2	1	150	0	0	2	1	142	0	0	40	38	3,525	1	4
(Israel)	15	Ofri Arad	33	31	3,038	2	2	2	2	191	1	0	0	1	1	99	0	4	4	382	0	1	40	38	3,710	3	3
(Israel)	21	Ayid Habshi	17	13	1,245	1	0	2	2	225	0	0	1	1	99	0	0	3	3	239	0	0	23	19	1,807	1	0
(Israel)	25	Raz Meir	14	4	798	0	3	0	0	0	0	0	2	1	105	1	0	3	3	294	0	0	19	8	1,179	1	3
(Cameroon)	26	Ernest Mabouka	34	33	3,038	1	5	2	2	191	0	0	1	1	90	0	0	3	3	294	0	0	40	39	3,613	1	5
Midfielders
(Israel)	6	Neta Lavi	33	33	3,194	2	2	3	3	304	0	0	1	1	99	0	0	4	4	391	0	0	41	41	3,988	2	2
(Israel)	7	Sintayehu Sallalich	22	13	1,237	5	2	2	1	89	0	1	0	0	0	0	0	0	0	0	0	0	24	14	1,326	5	3
(Israel)	8	Dolev Haziza	31	24	2,275	6	10	3	3	306	2	0	2	2	164	0	1	4	2	203	0	1	40	31	2,948	8	12
(Netherlands)	10	Tjaronn Chery	36	34	3,343	10	11	3	2	206	0	0	1	0	33	0	0	0	0	0	0	0	40	36	3,582	10	11
(Israel)	18	Yuval Ashkenazi	26	26	2,374	7	5	3	3	215	1	0	1	1	90	0	0	4	4	375	3	1	34	34	3,054	11	6
(Israel)	27	Maxim Plakuschenko	27	10	1,179	1	3	3	1	235	0	0	2	1	72	0	1	3	3	200	1	0	35	15	1,686	2	4
(Israel)	29	Suf Podgoreanu	5	0	56	1	0	0	0	0	0	0	0	0	0	0	0	0	0	0	0	0	5	0	56	0	1
(Netherlands)	30	Yanic Wildschut	32	27	2,104	5	4	3	1	144	0	0	2	1	176	0	0	1	1	16	0	0	38	29	2,440	5	4
(Israel)	32	Timothy Muzie	0	0	0	0	0	0	0	0	0	0	1	0	23	0	0	0	0	0	0	0	1	0	23	0	0
(Israel)	33	Maor Levi	4	0	74	0	0	0	0	0	0	0	1	0	9	0	0	0	0	0	0	0	5	0	83	0	0
Forwards
(Israel)	9	Mohammed Awaed	26	3	742	5	1	2	1	65	0	0	1	1	65	0	0	3	1	144	2	1	32	6	1,045	7	2
(Israel)	11	Yarden Shua	20	4	740	2	2	2	0	106	1	1	0	0	0	0	0	4	4	294	0	1	26	8	1,140	4	4
(Australia)	13	Nikita Rukavytsya	36	36	3,114	22	6	3	3	213	0	0	2	2	153	1	0	3	2	184	1	1	44	43	3,664	24	7
(Israel)	36	Stav Nahmani	1	0	10	0	0	0	0	0	0	0	0	0	0	0	0	0	0	0	0	0	1	0	10	0	0
Players who no longer play for Maccabi Haifa
(Brazil)	2	Allyson	1	1	28	0	0	0	0	0	0	0	2	2	195	0	0	3	1	112	0	1	6	4	335	0	1
(Israel)	16	Mohammad Abu Fani	0	0	0	0	0	0	0	0	0	0	2	2	136	0	0	3	0	96	0	0	5	1	232	0	0
(Spain)	16	Lillo	1	1	61	0	0	0	0	0	0	0	0	0	0	0	0	0	0	0	0	0	1	1	61	0	0
(Israel)	19	Gil Itzhak	0	0	0	0	0	0	0	0	0	0	1	0	33	0	0	0	0	0	0	0	1	0	33	0	0
(Cameroon)	19	Jeando Fuchs	6	1	176	0	0	1	1	129	0	0	0	0	0	0	0	0	0	0	0	0	7	2	305	0	0
(Israel)	23	Shay Ben David	0	0	0	0	0	0	0	0	0	0	1	1	99	0	0	0	0	0	0	0	1	1	99	0	0
(Israel)	24	Yahav Gurfinkel	0	0	0	0	0	0	0	0	0	0	1	1	99	0	0	0	0	0	0	0	1	1	99	0	0

=== Goals ===
Updated on 8 July 2020

Rank	Player	Position	Ligat HaAl	State Cup	Toto Cup	Europa League	Total
1	(Australia) Nikita Rukavytsya	FW	22	0	1	1	24
2	(Israel) Yuval Ashkenazi	MF	7	1	0	3	11
3	(Netherlands) Tjaronn Chery	MF	10	0	0	0	10
4	(Israel) Dolev Haziza	MF	6	2	0	0	8
5	(Israel) Mohammed Awaed	FW	5	0	0	2	7
6	(Netherlands) Yanic Wildschut	FW	5	0	0	0	5
6	(Israel) Sintayehu Sallalich	MF	5	0	0	0	5
7	(Israel) Yarden Shua	FW	2	1	0	1	4
8	(Israel) Ofri Arad	DF	2	1	0	0	3
9	(Israel) Neta Lavi	DF	2	0	0	0	2
9	(Australia) Trent Sainsbury	DF	2	0	0	0	2
9	(Israel) Maxim Plakuschenko	MF	1	0	0	1	2
10	(Israel) Ayid Habshi	DF	1	0	0	0	1
10	(Israel) Sun Menahem	DF	1	0	0	0	1
10	(Cameroon) Ernest Mabouka	DF	1	0	0	0	1
10	(Israel) Raz Meir	DF	0	0	1	0	1
Own goals			1	0	0	0	1

=== Assists ===
Updated on 8 July 2020

Rank	Player	Position	Ligat HaAl	State Cup	Toto Cup	Europa League	Total
1	(Israel) Dolev Haziza	MF	10	0	1	1	12
2	(Netherlands) Tjaronn Chery	MF	11	0	0	0	11
3	(Australia) Nikita Rukavytsya	FW	6	0	0	1	7
4	(Israel) Yuval Ashkenazi	MF	5	0	0	1	6
5	(Cameroon) Ernest Mabouka	DF	5	0	0	0	5
6	(Netherlands) Yanic Wildschut	MF	4	0	0	0	4
6	(Israel) Yarden Shua	FW	2	1	0	1	4
6	(Israel) Maxim Plakuschenko	MF	3	0	1	0	4
6	(Israel) Sun Menahem	DF	2	2	0	0	4
7	(Israel) Ofri Arad	DF	2	0	0	1	3
8	(Israel) Sintayehu Sallalich	MF	2	1	0	0	3
8	(Israel) Raz Meir	DF	3	0	0	0	3
9	(Israel) Mohammed Awaed	FW	1	0	0	1	2
9	(Israel) Neta Lavi	MF	2	0	0	0	2
10	(Israel) Suf Podgoreanu	MF	1	0	0	0	1
11	(Brazil) Allyson dos Santos	DF	0	0	0	1	1

=== Clean sheets ===
Updated on 25 June 2020

Rank	Pos.	No.	Name	Ligat HaAl	State Cup	Toto Cup	Europa League	Total
1	GK	44	(Israel) Josh Cohen	15	1			16
2	GK	55	(Israel) Guy Haimov	4			1	4

=== Disciplinary record (Ligat Ha'Al and State Cup) ===
Updated on 8 July 2020

No.	Pos	Nat	Name	Ligat Ha'Al			State Cup			Total		
No.	Pos	Nat	Name	Booked	(yellow card) (yellow-red card)	Sent off (straight red)	Booked	(yellow card) (yellow-red card)	Sent off (straight red)	Booked	(yellow card) (yellow-red card)	Sent off (straight red)
6	MF	(Israel)	Neta Lavi	12	1					12	1	
15	DF	(Israel)	Ofri Arad	10			1			11		
8	MF	(Israel)	Dolev Haziza	9						9		
26	DF	(Cameroon)	Ernest Mabouka	7						7		
21	DF	(Israel)	Ayid Habshi	6						6		
12	DF	(Israel)	Sun Menahem	5			1			6		
4	DF	(Australia)	Trent Sainsbury	4						4		
11	FW	(Israel)	Yarden Shua	3			1			4		
27	MF	(Israel)	Maxim Plakuschenko	3			1			4		
7	MF	(Israel)	Sintayehu Sallalich	3			1			4		
10	MF	(Netherlands)	Tjaronn Chery	3			1			4		
18	MF	(Israel)	Yuval Ashkenazi	3						3		
9	FW	(Israel)	Mohammed Awaed	2			1			3		
13	FW	(Australia)	Nikita Rukavytsya	2						2		
25	DF	(Israel)	Raz Meir	1						1		
30	MF	(Netherlands)	Yanic Wildschut	1						1		
5	DF	(Israel)	Rami Gershon	1						1		

=== Suspensions ===
Updated on 5 June 2020

Player	Date Received	Offence	Length of suspension		
Ayid Habshi	25 July 2019	(red card) 44' vs Strasbourg (A)	1 Match	Strasbourg (H)	1 August 2019
Ernest Mabouka	9 December 2019	(yellow card) 72' vs Hapoel Be'er Sheva (A)	1 Match	Sektzia Nes Tziona (H)	21 December 2019
Ofri Arad	9 December 2019	(yellow card) 79' vs Hapoel Be'er Sheva (A)	1 Match	Sektzia Nes Tziona (H)	21 December 2019
Neta Lavi	24 December 2019	(yellow card) 60' vs Hapoel Haifa (H)	1 Match	Maccabi Tel Aviv (H)	6 January 2020
Ayid Habshi	11 January 2020	(yellow card) 46' vs Maccabi Netanya (A)	1 Match	Sektzia Nes Tziona (H)	18 January 2020
Dolev Haziza	10 February 2020	(yellow card) 77' vs Beitar Jerusalem (A)	1 March	F.C. Ashdod (A)	22 February 2020
Neta Lavi	1 March 2020	(yellow card) 88' vs Hapoel Be'er Sheva (H)	1 Match	Hapoel Tel Aviv (H)	30 May 2020
Sun Menahem	1 March 2020	(yellow card) 36' vs Hapoel Be'er Sheva (H)	1 Match	Hapoel Tel Aviv (H)	30 May 2020
Ofri Arad	8 March 2020	(yellow card) 68' vs Hapoel Be'er Sheva (H)	1 Match	Maccabi Tel Aviv (A)	3 June 2020
Neta Lavi	3 June 2020	(yellow card) 49' (yellow-red card) 82' vs Maccabi Tel Aviv (A)	1 Match	Hapoel Haifa (H)	7 June 2020
Dolev Haziza	27 June 2020	(yellow card) 37' vs Hapoel Be'er Sheva (H)	1 March	Maccabi Tel Aviv (H)	4 July 2020

=== Penalties ===
Updated on 21 June 2020

Date	Penalty Taker	Scored	Opponent	Competition
10 November 2019	(Netherlands) Tjaronn Chery	Yes	Beitar Jerusalem	Ligat Ha'Al
10 February 2020	(Netherlands) Tjaronn Chery	No	Beitar Jerusalem	Ligat Ha'Al
20 June 2020	(Netherlands) Tjaronn Chery	No	Hapoel Be'er Sheva	Ligat Ha'Al

=== Overall ===
	Total	Home	Away
Games played	44	22	22
Games won	29	13	16
Games drawn	6	4	2
Games lost	9	5	4
Biggest win	5-0 vs Hapoel Tel Aviv	5-0 vs Hapoel Tel Aviv	3-0 vs Sektzia Nes Tziona; 3-0 Hapoel Kfar Saba; 3-0 vs Hapoel Hadera; 4-1 vs Hapoel Haifa
Biggest loss	1-3 vs Strasbourg	0-1 vs Hapoel Be'er Sheva; 3-4 vs Maccabi Tel Aviv; 0-1 vs Hapoel Kfar Saba; 1-2 vs Hapoel Be'er Sheva; 1-2 vs Hapoel Tel Aviv	1-3 vs Strasbourg; 0-2 vs Maccabi Tel Aviv
Biggest win (League)	5-0 vs Hapoel Tel Aviv	5-0 vs Hapoel Tel Aviv	3-0 vs Sektzia Nes Tziona; 3-0 vs Hapoel Kfar Saba; 3-0 vs Hapoel Hadera; 4-1 vs Hapoel Haifa
Biggest loss (League)	0-2 vs Beitar Jerusalem; 0-2 vs Maccabi Tel Aviv	3-4 vs Maccabi Tel Aviv; 0-1 vs Hapoel Kfar Saba vs Hapoel Tel Aviv	0-2 vs Beitar Jerusalem; 0-2 vs Maccabi Tel Aviv
Biggest win (Cup)	3-1 vs Sektzia Nes Tziona	3-1 vs Sektzia Nes Tziona	1-0 vs Hapoel Umm al-Fahm
Biggest loss (Cup)	1-2 vs Hapoel Be'er Sheva	1-2 vs Hapoel Be'er Sheva	
Biggest win (Toto)	2-1 vs Maccabi Netanya	-	2-1 vs Maccabi Netanya
Biggest loss (Toto)	0-1 vs Hapoel Be'er Sheva	0-1 vs Hapoel Be'er Sheva	-
Biggest win (Europe)	2-0 vs Mura	2-0 vs Mura	3-2 vs Mura
Biggest loss (Europe)	1-3 vs Strasbourg	-	1-3 vs Strasbourg
Goals scored	86	49	37
Goals conceded	40	24	17
Goal difference	+46	+16	+20
Clean sheets	18	9	9
Average GF per game	1.95	2.23	1.68
Average GA per game	0.91	1.05	0.77
Yellow cards	86	40	46
Red cards	2	0	2
Most appearances	(Australia) Nikita Rukavytsya (44)		
Most minutes played	(Israel) Neta Lavi (3,988)		
Most goals	(Australia) Nikita Rukavytsya (24)		
Most Assist	(Israel) Dolev Haziza (12)		
Penalties for	3	1	2
Penalties against	6	4	2
Penalties saved	2	1	1
Winning rate	65.91%	59.09%	72.73%

Last updated: Updated on 18 July 2020
Source: Competitive matches
