= 2019–20 Toto Cup Al =

Tournament details
- Country: Israel
- Teams: 14

Final positions
- Champions: Beitar Jerusalem (3rd title)
- Runners-up: Maccabi Tel Aviv

The 2019–20 Toto Cup Al was the 35th season of the third-tier football tournament in Israel since its introduction and the 14th tournament involving Israeli Premier League clubs only.

Maccabi Tel Aviv were the defending champions.

== Format changes ==
The four clubs playing in the Champions League and Europa League (Maccabi Tel Aviv, Bnei Yehuda Tel Aviv, Maccabi Haifa and Hapoel Be'er Sheva) will not take part in the group stage, while the remaining ten clubs were divided into two groups of five clubs. At the end of the group stage each of the group winners will qualify to the semi-finals. Maccabi Tel Aviv and Bnei Yehuda Tel Aviv will play (in the 2019 Israel Super Cup match) for a place in one of the semi-finals (meeting the group winner with the fewest points accumulated), while Maccabi Haifa and Hapoel Be'er Sheva will play for a place in the other semi-final (meeting the group winner with the most points accumulated). All the clubs will participate in classification play-offs.

== Group stage ==
Groups were allocated according to geographic distribution of the clubs, with the northern clubs allocated to Group A, and the southern clubs allocated to Group B. Each club will play the other clubs once.

The matches are scheduled to start on 27 July 2019.

=== Group A ===
| Pos | Team | Pld | W | D | L | GF | GA | GD | Pts | Qualification or relegation | IKS | MNE | HHD | HHA | HKS |
|---|---|---|---|---|---|---|---|---|---|---|---|---|---|---|---|
| 1 | Ironi Kiryat Shmona | 4 | 3 | 0 | 1 | 8 | 7 | +1 | 9 | Semi-finals | — | 2–1 | | | 3–1 |
| 2 | Maccabi Netanya | 4 | 2 | 1 | 1 | 5 | 3 | +2 | 7 | 5–8th classification play-offs | | — | | 2–0 | 1–0 |
| 3 | Hapoel Hadera | 4 | 1 | 2 | 1 | 6 | 6 | 0 | 5 | 9–10th classification play-offs | 1–2 | 1–1 | — | | |
| 4 | Hapoel Haifa | 4 | 1 | 1 | 2 | 6 | 6 | 0 | 4 | 11–12th classification play-offs | 4–1 | | 1–2 | — | |
| 5 | Hapoel Kfar Saba | 4 | 0 | 2 | 2 | 4 | 7 | −3 | 2 | 13–14th classification play-offs | | | 2–2 | 1–1 | — |

Updated to match(es) played on unknown. Source: Israel Football Association
Rules for classification: 1) points; 2) goal difference; 3) number of wins; 4) goals scored; 5) head to head; 6)deciding match.

=== Group B ===
| Pos | Team | Pld | W | D | L | GF | GA | GD | Pts | Qualification or relegation | BEI | ASH | NES | HRA | HTA |
|---|---|---|---|---|---|---|---|---|---|---|---|---|---|---|---|
| 1 | Beitar Jerusalem | 4 | 3 | 1 | 0 | 6 | 2 | +4 | 10 | Semi-finals | — | 1–1 | 2–1 | | |
| 2 | F.C. Ashdod | 4 | 2 | 2 | 0 | 9 | 5 | +4 | 8 | 5–8th classification play-offs | | — | 1–0 | | 3–2 |
| 3 | Sektzia Nes Tziona | 4 | 1 | 2 | 1 | 4 | 4 | 0 | 5 | 9–10th classification play-offs | | | — | 0–0 | 1–2 |
| 4 | Hapoel Ra'anana | 4 | 1 | 1 | 2 | 3 | 7 | −4 | 4 | 11–12th classification play-offs | 0–2 | 1–4 | | — | |
| 5 | Hapoel Tel Aviv | 4 | 0 | 0 | 4 | 4 | 8 | −4 | 0 | 13–14th classification play-offs | 0–1 | | | 2–1 | — |

Updated to match(es) played on unknown. Source: Israel Football Association
Rules for classification: 1) points; 2) goal difference; 3) number of wins; 4) goals scored; 5) head to head; 6)deciding match.

== European qualification route ==
=== Israel Super Cup ===
20 July 2019
20:30

| Maccabi Tel Aviv | 1–0 | Bnei Yehuda |

HaMoshava Stadium, Petah Tikva
Attendance: 8,169

=== UEFA qualifiers match ===
21 July 2019
20:30

| Maccabi Haifa | 0 –1 | Hapoel Be'er Sheva |
|---|---|---|
| Itzhak (yellow card) 66'; Dolev Haziza (yellow card) 83'; Abu Fani (yellow card) 90+4'; Maor Levy (yellow card) 90+5' | Report | Niv Zrihan 19' (pen.); Tomer Yosefi (yellow card) 23' (yellow-red card) 62'; Levi (yellow card) 34' (yellow-red card) 55' |

Sammy Ofer Stadium, Haifa
Attendance: 4,137
Referee: Orel Grinfeld

== Classification play-offs ==
=== 5–6th classification match ===
| 19 August 2019 | F.C. Ashdod | 1–1 (4–2 p) | Bnei Yehuda | Ashdod |
| 19:00 | Azulay 45' | | Elo 17' | Stadium: Yud-Alef Stadium; Referee: Ziv Adler |
| | Penalties |
| | Ohad Rabinovich (penalty scored); Moshel (penalty scored); David (penalty scored); Leonard Owusu (penalty scored) | | Ariel Lazmi (penalty scored); Nir Gevili (penalty scored); Ben Shimoni (penalty missed); Yakir Shaul (penalty missed) |

=== 7–8th classification match ===
| 17 August 2019 | Maccabi Netanya | 1–2 | Maccabi Haifa | Netanya |
| 20:30 | Dolev Azulay (yellow card) 80'; Kanichowsky (yellow card) 81', (goal) 89' | Report | Rukavytsya 20'; Arad (yellow card) 52'; Raz Meir 90+4' | Stadium: Netanya Stadium; Attendance: 3,500; Referee: Gal Leibovich |

=== 9–10th classification match ===
| 17 August 2019 | Sektzia Nes Tziona | 0–0 (8–9 p) | Hapoel Hadera | Petah Tikva |
| 19:00 | Noam Cohen (yellow card) 68' | Report | Lúcio (yellow card) 12' | Stadium: HaMoshava Stadium; Attendance: 280; Referee: Ohad Asulin |
| | Penalties |
| | Ramaric Etou (penalty scored); Raz Stein (penalty scored); Touray (penalty scored); Osher Abu (penalty scored); Mizrahi (penalty scored); Noam Cohen (penalty scored); Levi (penalty scored); Amnon Tadele (penalty scored); Benny Natan (penalty missed) | | Alon Drei (penalty scored); Sagiv Solomon (penalty scored); Yarin Hasan (penalty scored); Yaniv Mizrahi (penalty scored); Eliel Peretz (penalty scored); Alex Mondom (penalty scored); Goldenberg (penalty scored); Jehonathan Levi (penalty scored); Ejide (penalty scored) |

=== 11–12th classification match ===
| 17 August 2019 | Hapoel Ra'anana | 1–0 | Hapoel Haifa | Ramat Gan |
| 20:00 | Nimni (yellow card) 7', (goal) 77'; Ido Levy (yellow card) 53'; Naah (yellow card) 56' | Report | Eli Balilty (yellow card) 38' | Stadium: Ramat Gan Stadium; Referee: Erez Papir |

=== 13–14th classification match ===
| 19 August 2019 | Hapoel Tel Aviv | 2–3 | Hapoel Kfar Saba | Petah Tikva |
| 20:30 | Barshazki 64'; Kevin Rainstein 81' (o.g.) | Report | Dan Azaria 45'; Kuku 76'; Fadida 78' | Stadium: HaMoshava Stadium; Referee: Roi Reinshreiber |

== Semi-finals ==
18 August 2019
19:00

| Ironi Kiryat Shmona | 0–1 | Maccabi Tel Aviv |
|---|---|---|
| | | Bartkus 49' (o.g.) |

Municipal Stadium, Kiryat Shmona
Attendance: 2,400
18 August 2019
20:30

| Beitar Jerusalem | 3–1 | Hapoel Be'er Sheva |
|---|---|---|
| Shalom Edri 38'; Gaëtan Varenne 45+2'; Marwan Kabha 54' (o.g.) | | Carrillo 16' |

Teddy Stadium, Jerusalem
Attendance: 8,000

== Final ==
24 September 2019

| Beitar Jerusalem | 2–0 | Maccabi Tel Aviv |
|---|---|---|
| Gaëtan Varenne 87'; Uri Magbo 90+3' | Report |

Netanya Stadium, Netanya
Attendance: 11,100
Referee: Ziv Adler

== Final rankings ==
| R | Team |
|---|---|
| 1 | Beitar Jerusalem |
| 2 | Maccabi Tel Aviv |
| 3 | Hapoel Ironi Kiryat Shmona |
| 4 | Hapoel Be'er Sheva |
| 5 | F.C. Ashdod |
| 6 | Bnei Yehuda |
| 7 | Maccabi Haifa |
| 8 | Maccabi Netanya |
| 9 | Hapoel Hadera |
| 10 | Sektzia Nes Tziona |
| 11 | Hapoel Ra'anana |
| 12 | Hapoel Haifa |
| 13 | Hapoel Kfar Saba |
| 14 | Hapoel Tel Aviv |
