= Suf Podgoreanu =

Israeli footballer

Personal information
- Full name: Suf Podgoreanu
- Date of birth: 20 January 2002 (age 24)
- Place of birth: Hadera, Israel
- Height: 1.93 m (6 ft 4 in)
- Positions: Winger; forward

Team information
- Current team: Kortrijk
- Number: 7

Youth career
- 2010–2013: Hapoel Hadera
- 2013–2020: Maccabi Haifa
- 2020–2021: → Roma (loan)

Senior career*
Years	Team	Apps	(Gls)
2019–2020	Maccabi Haifa	5	(0)
2020–2021	Roma	0	(0)
2021–2022	Spezia	5	(0)
2022–2023	→ Maccabi Haifa (loan)	0	(0)
2022–2026	Maccabi Haifa	30	(1)
2024–2025	→ Heracles Almelo (loan)	32	(1)
2026–	Kortrijk	0	(0)

International career^{‡}
2017	Israel U16	3	(1)
2018–2019	Israel U17	14	(2)
2019	Israel U18	4	(2)
2021–2024	Israel U21	10	(1)
2021–	Israel	2	(0)
- * Club domestic league appearances and goals as of 10 June 2026 ‡ National team caps and goals as of 22 May 2023

Suf Podgoreanu (Hebrew: סוף פודגוראנו; born 20 January 2002) is an Israeli professional footballer who plays as a winger or as a forward for Belgian Pro League club Kortrijk.

== Early and personal life ==
Podgoreanu was born and raised in Hadera, Israel, to an Israeli family of Ashkenazi Jewish descent, and is of Romanian-Jewish descent on his father's side. Both his father Danny Podgoreanu and his grandfather played for the local Hapoel clubs as well.

He also holds a Romanian passport, on account of his Ashkenazi Jewish ancestors, which eases the move to certain European football leagues.

== Club career ==
=== Maccabi Haifa ===
Podgoreanu came through the youth ranks of Maccabi Haifa, where he was a prolific goalscorer for the under-19s, before joining the first team during the 2019–20 season. Podgoreanu made his debut for Maccabi Haifa on 3 June 2020 in a game against Maccabi Tel Aviv in a league match of the 2019–20 season.

=== Italy ===
Podgoreanu moved to Italian side Roma at the beginning of the 2019–20 season, initially joining their youth team. After a season under Alberto De Rossi's management with 27 games, 3 goals and 6 assists, where he even joined the bench of the first team for a few games, he was transferred to their Serie A rivals Spezia. Podgoreanu made his debut for Spezia on 19 September 2021, replacing Janis Antiste in a 2–1 Serie A away win.

=== Return to Maccabi Haifa ===
On 2 September 2022, Podgoreanu returned to Maccabi Haifa on loan with an option to buy. On 16 May 2023, he won his first adult title, as winning the Israeli Premier League championship.

==== Loan to Heracles Almelo ====
On 22 August 2024, Podgoreanu was loaned by Heracles Almelo in the Netherlands.

=== Kortrijk ===
On 10 June 2026, Podgoreanu signed a four-season contract with Kortrijk in Belgium.

== International career ==
Podgoreanu has been a youth international for Israel since 2017.

He also plays for the Israel U-21 since 2021.

He was called up for the senior Israel national team in October 2021, during their 2022 FIFA World Cup qualifiers - UEFA. Podgoreanu debuted for a full match with the senior team in a 3–2 home win for Israel against Faroe Islands on 15 November 2021, at the 2022 FIFA World Cup qualifiers - UEFA, where he had an assist as well.

== Career statistics ==
=== Club ===
As of 1 June 2023

Appearances and goals by club, season and competition
Club	Season	Division	League		National cup		League Cup		Other		Continental		Total	
Club	Season	Division	Apps	Goals	Apps	Goals	Apps	Goals	Apps	Goals	Apps	Goals	Apps	Goals
Maccabi Haifa	2023–24	Israeli Premier League	0	0	0	0	0	0	0	0	0	0	0	0
Career total			0	0	0	0	0	0	0	0	0	0	0	0

=== International ===
Appearances and goals by national team and year
National team	Year	Apps	Goals
Israel	2021	2	0
Total		2	0

== Honours ==
Maccabi Haifa

- Israeli Premier League: 2022–23
- Israel Super Cup: 2023

== See also ==
- List of Jewish footballers
- List of Jews in sports
- List of Israelis
- List of Israel international footballers
- List of foreign Serie A players#Israel (UEFA)
