= Yanic Wildschut =

Surinamese footballer (born 1991)

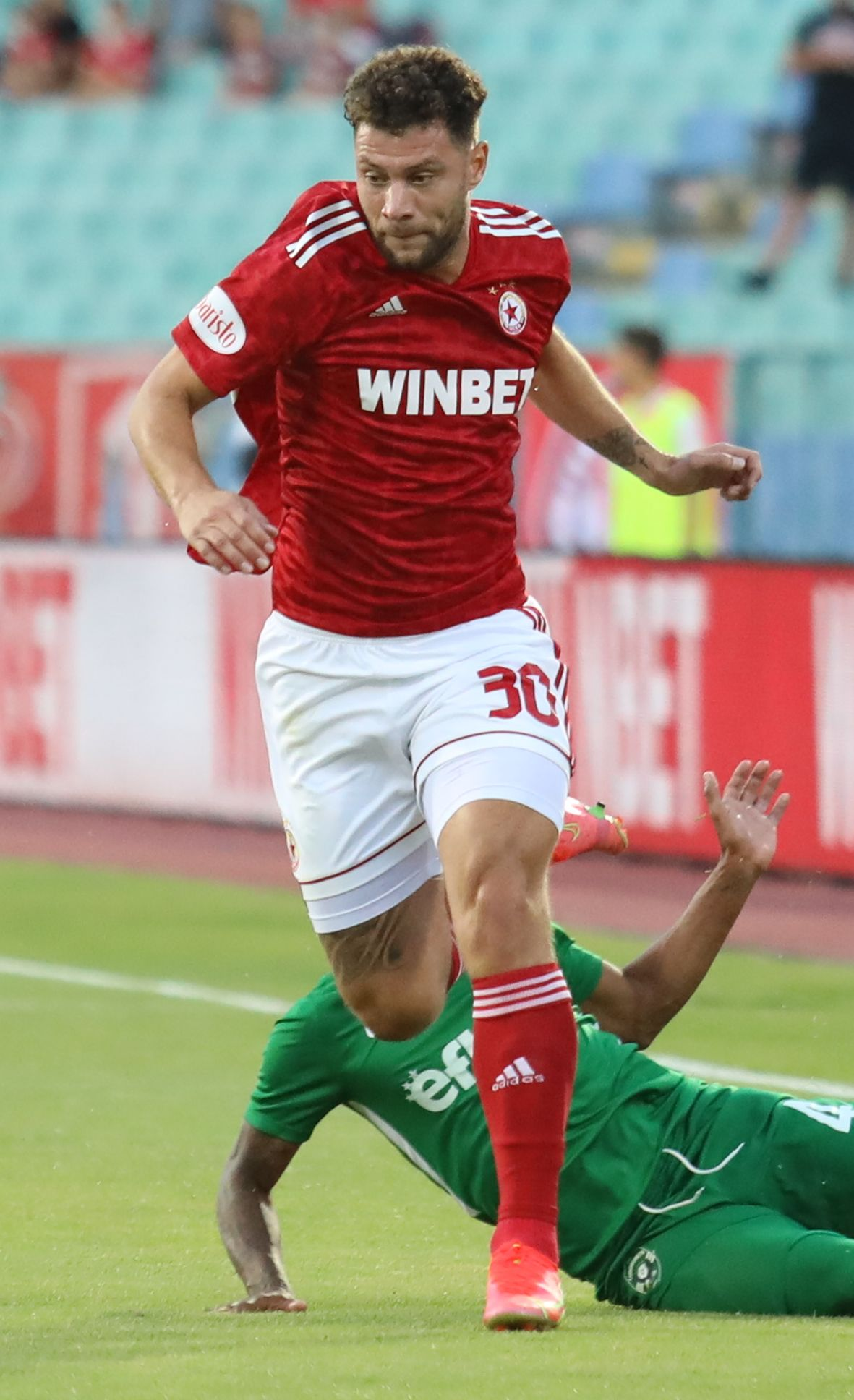
- Wildschut with CSKA Sofia in 2021

Personal information
- Full name: Yanic-Sonny Wildschut
- Date of birth: 1 November 1991 (age 35)
- Place of birth: Amsterdam, Netherlands
- Height: 1.87 m (6 ft 2 in)
- Position: Winger

Youth career
- Sporting Noord
- DWV
- Volendam
- Almere City
- –2007: Rksv TOB
- 2007–2010: Ajax

Senior career*
Years	Team	Apps	(Gls)
2010–2011	Zwolle	33	(3)
2011–2013	VVV-Venlo	61	(8)
2013–2014	SC Heerenveen	22	(2)
2014	→ ADO Den Haag (loan)	7	(0)
2014–2016	Middlesbrough	12	(2)
2015–2016	→ Wigan Athletic (loan)	13	(2)
2016–2017	Wigan Athletic	46	(10)
2017–2019	Norwich City	25	(2)
2018	→ Cardiff City (loan)	10	(0)
2018–2019	→ Bolton Wanderers (loan)	16	(2)
2019–2021	Maccabi Haifa	54	(6)
2021–2022	CSKA Sofia	29	(0)
2022–2023	Oxford United	23	(1)
2023–2025	Exeter City	31	(1)

International career^{‡}
2012–2013	Netherlands U21	10	(0)
2022–	Suriname	3	(1)
- * Club domestic league appearances and goals as of 18:00, 21 May 2024 (UTC) ‡ National team caps and goals as of 8 June 2022

Yanic-Sonny Wildschut (Dutch pronunciation: [ˈjaːnɪk ˈʋɪltsxʏt]; born 1 November 1991) is a professional footballer who last played as a winger for EFL League Two club Exeter City. Born in the Netherlands, he plays for the Suriname national team.

== Club career ==
=== Zwolle ===
Born in Amsterdam, Netherlands, Wildschut played for various youth teams, including Volendam and Almere City, before moving to Ajax, where he became a product of the famous academy. Despite having a good year, Wildschut was released when they decided against renewing his contract and joined FC Zwolle in June 2010.

Wildschut made his debut for Zwolle in an Eerste Divisie league match against MVV. The match ended in a goalless draw. He scored his first goal for the club on 29 October 2010, in a 4–0 win over Almere City. A week later, he scored again in the fourth round of the KNVB Cup, though Zwolle would eventually lose in the penalty shootout. As the 2010–11 season progressed, Wildshut scored three more goals against Sparta Rotterdam, and Cambuur twice in different fixtures. In his first season at Zwolle, Wildschut finished the season with thirty-eight appearances and five goals in all competition.

=== VVV-Venlo ===
After one season with Zwolle, Wildschut signed a three-year deal with VVV-Venlo on 29 June 2011.

Wildschut made his VVV-Venlo debut playing for 68 minutes of a 0–0 draw against Utrecht in the opening game of the season. He scores his first VVV-Venlo goal on 22 October 2011 in a 4–1 win over RKC Waalwijk. His second goal then came on 20 November 2011, in a 2–1 loss against Groningen. As the 2011–12 season progressed, Wildschut went on to score five more goals, against Excelsior, Groningen, Heracles Almelo, Vitesse and Twente, as he helped the club stay in top-flight football for another season. In his first season at VVV-Venlo, Wildschut made thirty-three appearances and scored four times in all competitions.

Ahead of the 2012–13 season, Wildschut attracted interest from clubs including AZ Alkmaar and Salzburg. Wildschut said that he would like to leave the club to step up to the challenge of a higher level. However, Wildschut stayed at the club and became a first-team regular, making thirty-five appearances and scoring once, against Utrecht. The club were relegated in the league after finishing in seventeenth place.

=== Heerenveen ===
On 24 June 2013, Wildschut signed a three-year deal with SC Heerenveen. He had been linked with a move to the club the previous season and had almost joined the club, but the move collapsed.

Wildschut made his Heerenveen debut in the opening game of the season, playing for 66 minutes before being substituted in a 4–2 loss against AZ. He scored his first goal for the club on 15 September 2013, in a 4–2 win over Groningen. After suffering an injury, he scored on his return, in a 1–1 draw against PSV Eindhoven on 23 November 2013. In six months at Heerenveen, before joining ADO Den Haag, he made eighteen appearances and scoring two times.

==== ADO Den Haag (loan) ====
On 31 January 2014, Wildschut was sent on loan to ADO Den Haag until the end of the season. After injuries delayed his debut, he made his first appearance on 15 February 2014, playing for 81 minutes before being substituted, in a 1–0 win over Roda JC. Despite suffering another injury, he went on to make seven appearances for the club.

After his loan spell at ADO Den Haag, Wildschut made four appearances for Heerenveen at the start of the 2014–15 season, including two assists in two matches against Excelsior and Utrecht.

=== Middlesbrough ===
On 1 September 2014, Wildschut joined English side Middlesbrough of the Championship on a two-year contract with the option of a further year.

After appearing as an unused substitute for the first three matches of the season, Wildschut made his Middlesbrough debut as a substitute in the League Cup against Liverpool on 23 September 2014. The match went to penalties and Wildschut converted his penalty, but Middlesbrough ultimately lost the shootout. His league debut followed, again as a substitute, in a 0–0 draw against Charlton Athletic on 27 September 2014. He scored his first goal for Middlesbrough in a 3–0 win against Rotherham United on 1 November 2014, and then three days later scored his second goal in a 4–0 win over Norwich City. However, Wildschut struggled to retain his first-team place at Middlesbrough and was restricted to thirteen appearances in his first season. As a result, he spent the rest of the 2014–15 season playing in the club's reserves to regain match fitness.

Wildschut scored his first goal the following season in the first round of the League Cup against Oldham Athletic. A week later on 22 August 2015, he made his first league appearance of the season, playing for 45 minutes in a 1–0 loss against Bristol City. Unable to maintain a first-team place, Wildschut was told by manager Aitor Karanka that he could leave the club on loan to play first-team football.

==== Wigan Athletic (loan) ====
On 2 October 2015, Wildschut was sent on loan to Wigan Athletic for three months, until January 2016.

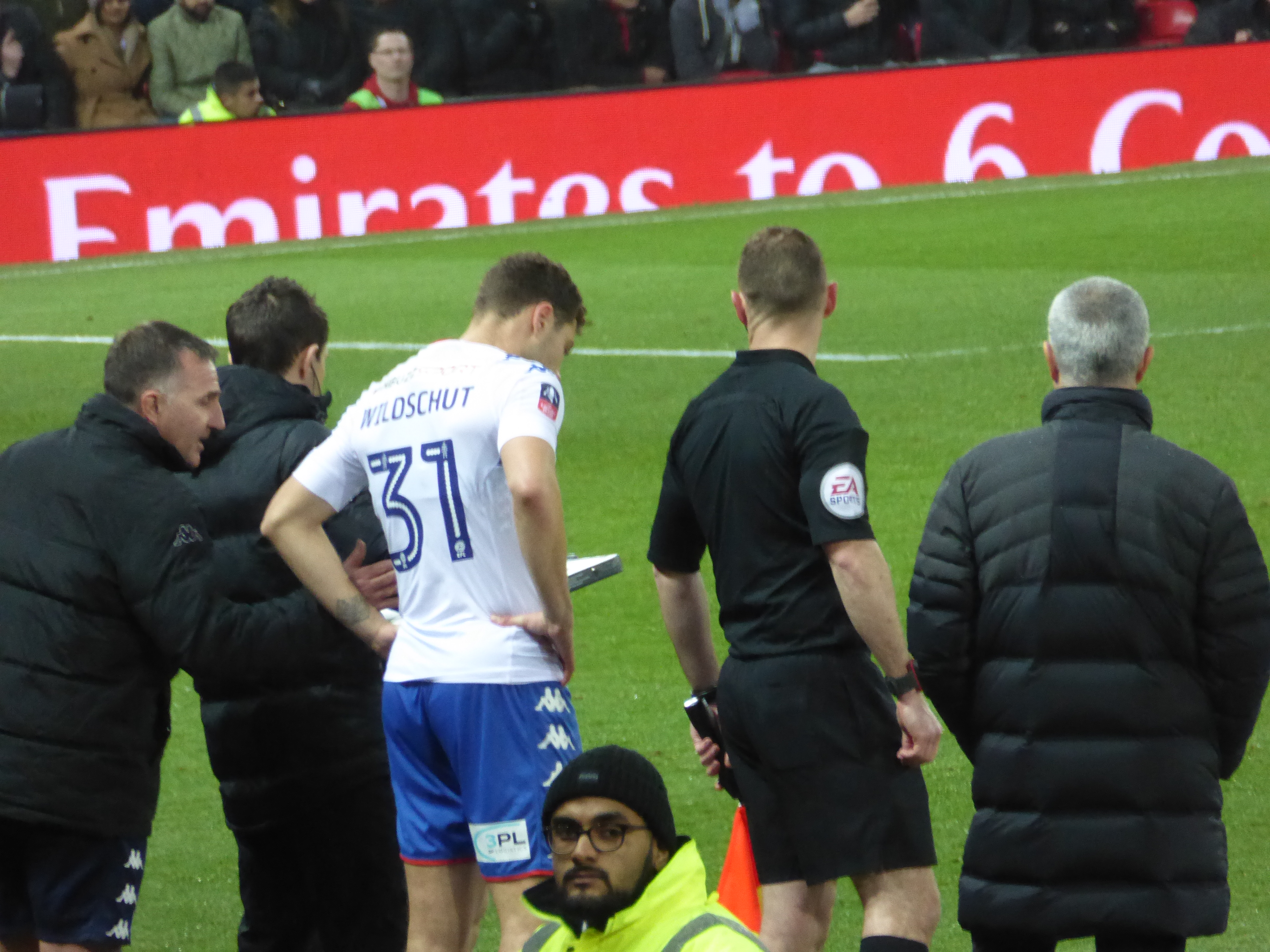
Wildschut being substituted on to make his final Wigan Athletic appearance: an FA Cup tie with Manchester United in January 2017.

Wildschut made his Wigan debut as a substitute in the second half of a 0–0 draw against Walsall on 3 October 2015. After his debut, Wildschut became a fans' favorite at Wigan Athletic, supporters chanting 'sign him on'. Three days later, on 6 October 2015, he scored his first goal for Wigan, the winner in a 3–2 victory over Crewe Alexandra in the Football League Trophy. Wildschut scored his first league goal for the club on 20 October 2015 in a 3–2 win against Peterborough United. By the end of 2015, Wilschut had scored three more goals, against Blackpool and Barnsley. He signed for Wigan Athletic on a permanent basis on 9 January 2016, Gazette Live reporting the sale fee as £1 million.

=== Wigan Athletic ===
Wildschut's first game for Wigan after signing on a permanent basis came on 12 January 2016, where he came on as a substitute in the second half of a 3–3 draw against Sheffield United. Wildschut went on to score five more goals in the 2015–16 season, against Walsall, Colchester United, Shrewsbury Town and Blackpool (twice). After finishing the season with thirty-eight appearances and nine goals in all competitions, having helped Wigan reach promotion to Championship, Wildschut was named in League One's PFA Team of the Year, alongside teammates Craig Morgan, Reece Wabara and Will Grigg.

In the 2016–17 season, Wildschut provided the assist for Alex Gilbey to score the club's first goal on their return to the Championship, in a 2–1 loss against Bristol City in the opening game of the season. Wildschut continued to be a first team-regular until he missed a game for personal reasons. He returned to the first team against Cardiff City on 29 October 2016, starting in a 1–0 win. He started in the 2–1 away win against Huddersfield Town on 28 November 2016, where he set up the opening goal for Reece Burke before scoring Wigan's second goal in a man-of-the-match performance.

=== Norwich City ===
On 31 January 2017, Wildschut joined Norwich City for a fee in the region of £7 million. He scored his first goal for Norwich in a 1–1 draw with Bristol City on 7 March 2017.

On 12 January 2018, he joined Cardiff City on loan for the remainder of the 2017–18 season, and was released by Norwich at the end of the 2018–19 season.

==== Bolton Wanderers (loan) ====
On 19 July 2018, Wildschut joined Bolton Wanderers on a season-long loan. He made his debut on the opening day of the season, 4 August, coming on as a substitute for Will Buckley against newly relegated West Bromwich Albion and scored in the 89th minute to make it 2–1, winning Bolton the game. Numerous injuries meant he only played 18 matches over the season.

=== Maccabi Haifa ===
On 5 July 2019, Wildschut signed for the Israeli Premier League club Maccabi Haifa.

=== CSKA Sofia ===
On 26 June 2021, Wildschut signed with Bulgarian A PFG club CSKA Sofia. On 9 December 2021, he scored his first goal for the team in the last minute of a 2–3 home defeat by Roma in a UEFA Conference League group stage match.

=== Oxford United ===
On 22 July 2022, Wildschut signed a two-year deal with EFL League One club Oxford United for an undisclosed fee. He suffered a hamstring injury 15 minutes into his debut in a pre-season friendly and missed the start of the season. On 17 December, he made his league debut for the club in a goalless draw against Sheffield Wednesday. His only goal came in a 2–1 league victory over Ipswich on 21 January 2023. He left the club by mutual consent in August 2023.

=== Exeter City ===
On 15 September 2023, Wildschut signed a short-term contract with EFL League One side Exeter City until January 2024, reuniting with former Wigan Athletic manager Gary Caldwell. On 17 January 2024, Wildschut's contract with the Grecians was extended until the end of the 2023–24 season.

Wildschut's contract at Exeter City was not renewed and he became a free agent from July 1, 2025.

== International career ==
Born in the Netherlands, Wildschut is of Surinamese descent. He debuted with the Surinamese national team in a friendly 1–0 loss to Thailand on 27 March 2022. Wildschut scored his first international goal for Suriname on 7 June 2022, during a 3–1 loss to Jamaica in the CONCACAF Nations League.

== Personal life ==
Wildschut is married and in late October 2016, he became a father when his wife gave birth to a son.

== Career statistics ==
=== Club ===
As of match played 27 January 2024

Appearances and goals by club, season and competition
Club	Season	League			National cup		League cup		Continental		Other		Total	
Club	Season	Division	Apps	Goals	Apps	Goals	Apps	Goals	Apps	Goals	Apps	Goals	Apps	Goals
FC Zwolle	2010–11	Eerste Divisie	33	3	2	1	–		–		4	1	39	5
VVV-Venlo	2011–12	Eredivisie	29	7	0	0	–		–		4	0	33	7
VVV-Venlo	2012–13	Eredivisie	32	1	1	0	–		–		2	0	35	1
VVV-Venlo	Total		61	8	1	0	0	0	0	0	6	0	68	8
SC Heerenveen	2013–14	Eredivisie	18	2	3	0	–		–		–		21	2
SC Heerenveen	2014–15	Eredivisie	4	0	0	0	–		–		–		4	0
SC Heerenveen	Total		22	2	3	0	0	0	0	0	0	0	25	2
ADO Den Haag (loan)	2013–14	Eredivisie	7	0	0	0	–		–		–		7	0
Middlesbrough	2014–15	Championship	11	2	1	0	2	1	–		0	0	14	3
Middlesbrough	2015–16	Championship	1	0	0	0	1	1	–		0	0	2	1
Middlesbrough	Total		12	2	1	0	3	2	0	0	0	0	16	4
Wigan Athletic (loan)	2015–16	League One	13	2	1	0	0	0	–		3 (Note: Appearance(s) in Football League Trophy)	2	17	4
Wigan Athletic	2015–16	League One	34	7	1	0	3	2	–		0	0	38	9
Wigan Athletic	2016–17	Championship	25	4	2	1	0	0	–		0	0	27	5
Wigan Athletic	Total		58	11	3	1	3	2	0	0	0	0	65	14
Norwich City	2016–17	Championship	9	1	0	0	0	0	–		0	0	9	1
Norwich City	2017–18	Championship	16	1	0	0	1	0	–		3	0	20	1
Norwich City	Total		25	2	0	0	1	0	0	0	3	0	29	2
Cardiff City (loan)	2017–18	Championship	10	0	0	0	0	0	–		0	0	10	0
Bolton Wanderers (loan)	2018–19	Championship	16	2	1	0	0	0	–		1	0	18	2
Maccabi Haifa	2019–20	Israeli Premier League	32	5	3	0	0	0	1	0	0	0	36	5
Maccabi Haifa	2020–21	Israeli Premier League	22	1	3	1	0	0	2	0	0	0	27	2
Maccabi Haifa	Total		54	6	6	1	0	0	3	0	0	0	63	7
CSKA Sofia	2021–22	Bulgarian First League	28	0	4	0	0	0	11	1	1	0	44	1
Oxford United	2022–23	League One	23	1	1	0	0	0	0	0	0	0	24	1
Exeter City	2023–24	League One	31	1	1	0	2	0	0	0	1	0	35	1
Career total			383	40	24	3	9	4	14	1	19	4	449	52

=== International ===
List of international goals scored by Yanic Wildschut
No.	Date	Venue	Opponent	Score	Result	Competition	Ref.
1.	7 June 2022	Independence Park, Kingston, Jamaica	Jamaica	1–1	3–1	2022-23 CONCACAF Nations League	

== Honours ==
Wigan Athletic

- Football League One: 2015–16

Cardiff City

- EFL Championship second-place promotion: 2017–18

Maccabi Haifa

- Israeli Premier League: 2020–21

Individual

- PFA Team of the Year: 2015–16 League One
