= Ikouwem Udo =

Nigerian footballer

Personal information
- Full name: Ikouwem Udo Utin
- Date of birth: 11 November 1999 (age 27)
- Place of birth: Akwa Ibom State, Nigeria
- Height: 1.72 m (5 ft 8 in)
- Position: Left back

Team information
- Current team: Marsa
- Number: 18

Youth career
- Alaska Football Academy
- Enyimba

Senior career*
Years	Team	Apps	(Gls)
2017–2019	Enyimba	24	(0)
2019–2021	Maccabi Haifa	7	(0)
2020–2021	→ Bnei Sakhnin (loan)	9	(0)
2021–2022	Slaven Belupo	7	(0)
2023	Shooting Stars	8	(0)
2023–	Marsa	6	(0)

International career^{‡}
2018–	Nigeria	4	(0)
- * Club domestic league appearances and goals as of 5 May 2024 ‡ National team caps and goals as of 09:42, 12 July 2020 (UTC)

Ikouwem Udo Utin (born 11 November 1999) is a Nigerian international footballer who plays for Tunisian club Marsa as a left back.

== Club career ==
Born in Akwa Ibom State, Udo began his career with Alaska Football Academy before moving to Enyimba at the age of 16. He made his senior debut in 2017. In February 2018 he won the NFF Young Player of the Year award. In May 2019 he signed for Israeli club Maccabi Haifa.

On 28 July 2020 he was loaned to Bnei Sakhnin until the end of the season.

On 4 September 2021 Udo signed with Croatian club NK Slaven Belupo.

== International career ==
He made his international debut for Nigeria in 2018.

== Honours ==
- 2018 NFF Young Player of the Year
