= Yuval Ashkenazi =

Israeli football player

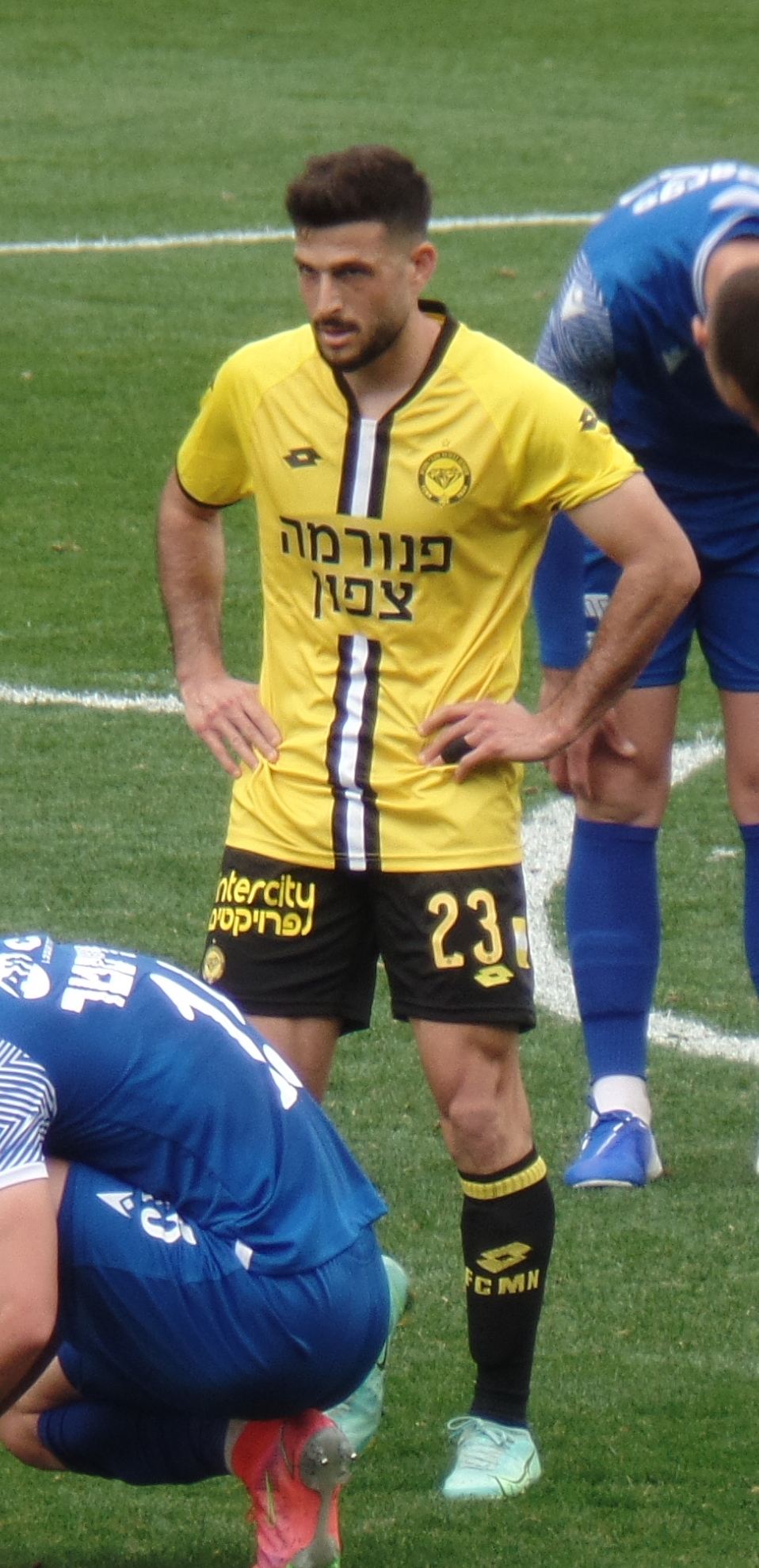
- Ashkenazi playing for Maccabi Netanya in 2022

Personal information
- Date of birth: 13 February 1992 (age 34)
- Place of birth: Givatayim, Israel
- Height: 1.73 m (5 ft 8 in)
- Position: Midfielder

Team information
- Current team: Hapoel Kfar Shalem
- Number: 1

Youth career
- Hapoel Ramat Gan

Senior career*
Years	Team	Apps	(Gls)
2012–2017	Hapoel Ramat Gan	0	(0)
2012–2013	→ Hapoel Azor	32	(0)
2014	→ Maccabi Kiryat Malakhi	11	(4)
2014–2015	→ Hapoel Kfar Shalem	22	(1)
2015–2016	→ Hapoel Azor	29	(9)
2016–2017	→ Hapoel Kfar Shalem	32	(7)
2017–2019	Bnei Yehuda Tel Aviv	57	(6)
2019–2022	Maccabi Haifa	49	(8)
2022–2023	Maccabi Netanya	23	(1)
2023	Bnei Sakhnin	6	(1)
2023–2024	Beitar Jerusalem	14	(0)
2025–	Hapoel Kfar Shalem	20	(4)
- * Club domestic league appearances and goals as of 24 June 2026

Yuval Ashkenazi (Hebrew: יובל אשכנזי; born 13 February 1992) is an Israeli professional footballer who plays as a midfielder for Hapoel Kfar Shalem.

== Early life ==
Ashkenazi was born in Givatayim, Israel, to a family of Jewish descent.

== Club career ==
He made his Israeli Premier League debut for Bnei Yehuda Tel Aviv on 23 September 2017 in a game against Hapoel Acre.

== Honours ==
=== Club ===
Bnei Yehuda Tel Aviv

- Israel State Cup: 2018–19

Maccabi Haifa

- Israeli Premier League: 2020–21
- Israel Toto Cup (Ligat Ha'Al): 2021–22
- Israel Super Cup: 2021
