= Gil Itzhak =

Israeli footballer

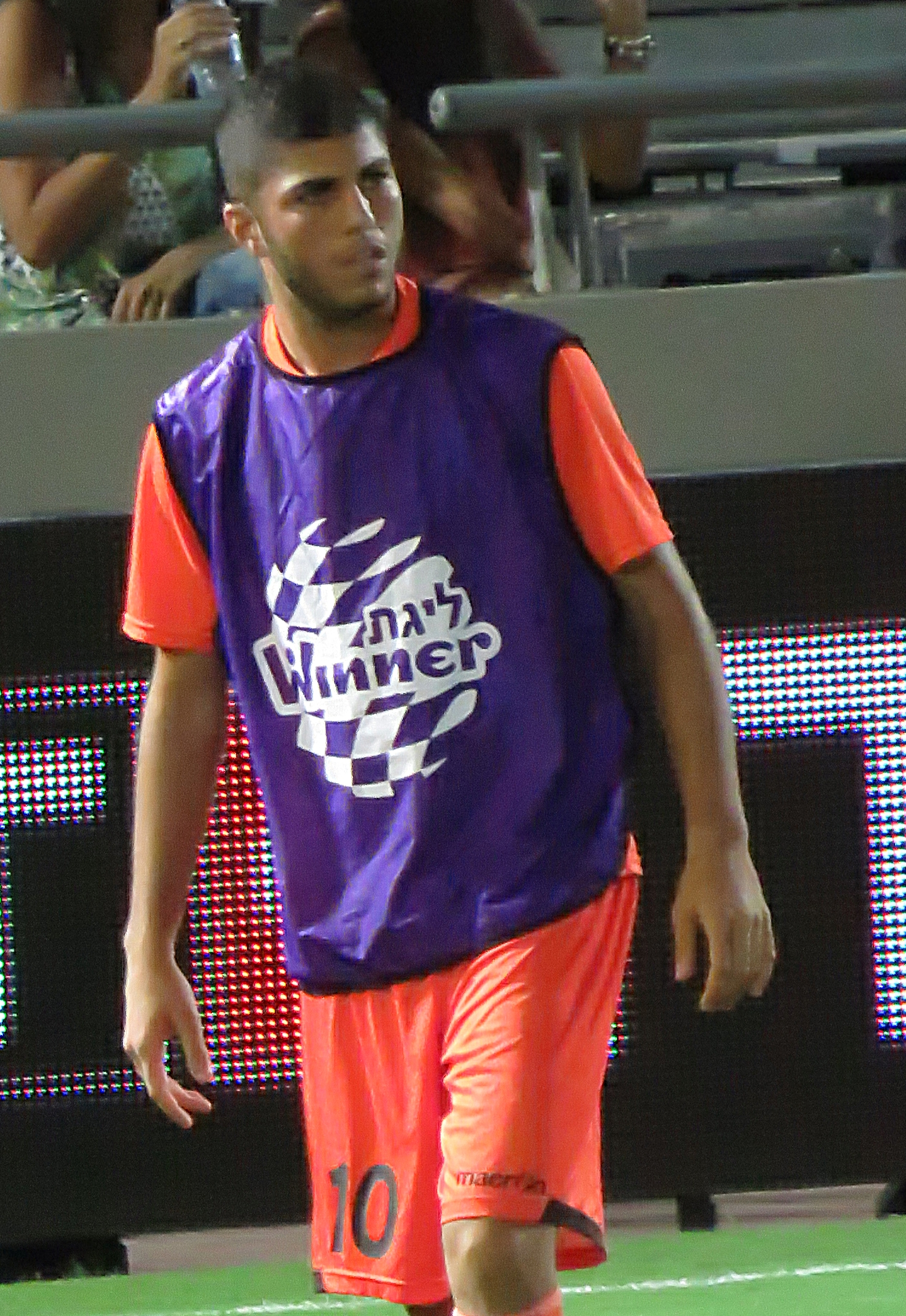
- Itzhak with Bnei Yehuda Tel Aviv in 2015

Personal information
- Full name: Gil Itzhak
- Date of birth: 29 June 1993 (age 33)
- Place of birth: Tel Aviv, Israel
- Position: Forward

Team information
- Current team: Bnei Yehuda Tel Aviv

Youth career
- Bnei Yehuda Tel Aviv

Senior career*
Years	Team	Apps	(Gls)
2012–2016	Bnei Yehuda Tel Aviv	62	(6)
2015–2016	→ Maccabi Sha'arayim (loan)	19	(12)
2016–2017	Maccabi Sha'arayim	36	(11)
2017–2019	Hapoel Rishon LeZion	73	(31)
2019–2020	Maccabi Haifa	0	(0)
2019–2020	→ Hapoel Rishon LeZion (loan)	34	(17)
2020–2021	Hapoel Tel Aviv	22	(2)
2021–2022	Hapoel Kfar Saba	37	(14)
2022–2023	Maccabi Netanya	14	(1)
2023	Hapoel Umm al-Fahm	18	(8)
2023–2024	Maccabi Jaffa	36	(22)
2024–2025	Bnei Yehuda Tel Aviv	37	(15)
2025–	Maccabi Jaffa	34	(16)

International career
2013–2015	Israel U21	3	(1)
- * Club domestic league appearances and goals as of 22 June 2026

Gil Itzhak (Hebrew: גיל יצחק; born 29 June 1993) is an Israeli professional footballer who plays as a forward for Israeli Club Maccabi Jaffa.

== Club career ==
Itzhak made his professional debut with Bnei Yehuda Tel Aviv on 8 December 2012 in a 2–0 win against F.C. Ashdod. On 13 April 2013, he scored his debut goal in a 2–2 draw against Maccabi Tel Aviv.

== International career ==
Itzhak made his debut for the Israel U-21 on 13 August 2013 in a 3–1 win. On 15 October 2013, he scored his debut goal in a 3–1 win against Norway.

== Honours ==
Bnei Yehuda Tel Aviv

- Liga Leumit: 2014–15

Maccabi Sha'arayim

- Liga Alef: 2015–16
