= Hagay Goldenberg =

Israeli footballer

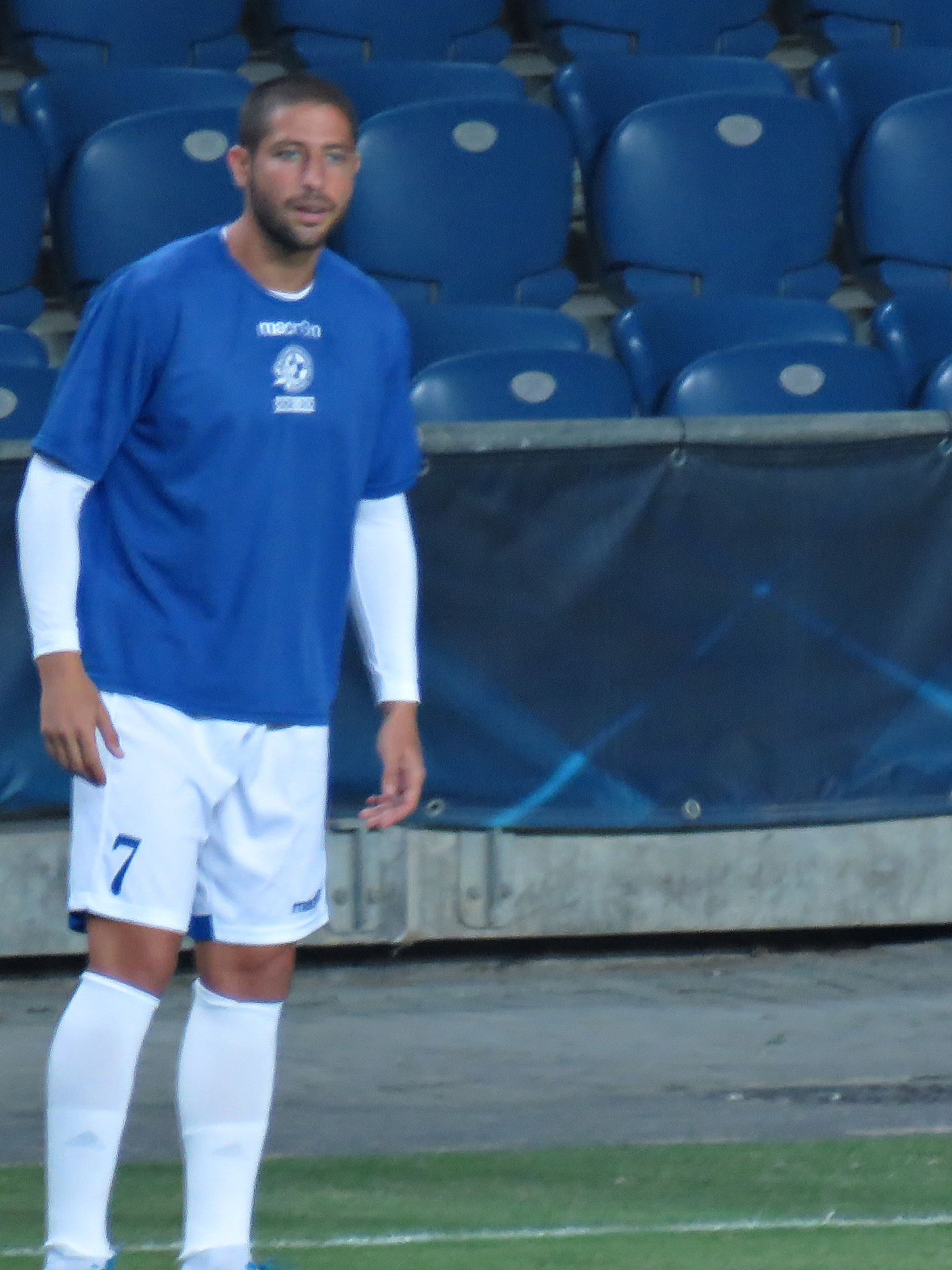

Personal information
- Full name: Hagay Goldenberg
- Date of birth: September 15, 1990 (age 36)
- Place of birth: Oranit, West Bank
- Height: 1.84 m (6 ft 1/2 in)
- Position: Right back

Youth career
- Maccabi Petah Tikva

Senior career*
Years	Team	Apps	(Gls)
2009–2017	Maccabi Petah Tikva	149	(3)
2017–2018	Maccabi Netanya	27	(0)
2018–2019	Ironi Kiryat Shmona	16	(0)
2019–2020	Hapoel Hadera	31	(2)
2020–2022	Bnei Sakhnin	38	(1)
2022	Hapoel Nof HaGalil	16	(0)
2022–2023	Beitar Jerusalem	3	(0)
2023	Hapoel Nof HaGalil	18	(0)
2024	Hapoel Kfar Saba	18	(0)
- * Club domestic league appearances and goals

Hagay Goldenberg (Hebrew: חגי גולדנברג; born 15 September 1990) is an Israeli former footballer.
