= Adi Nimni =

Israeli footballer

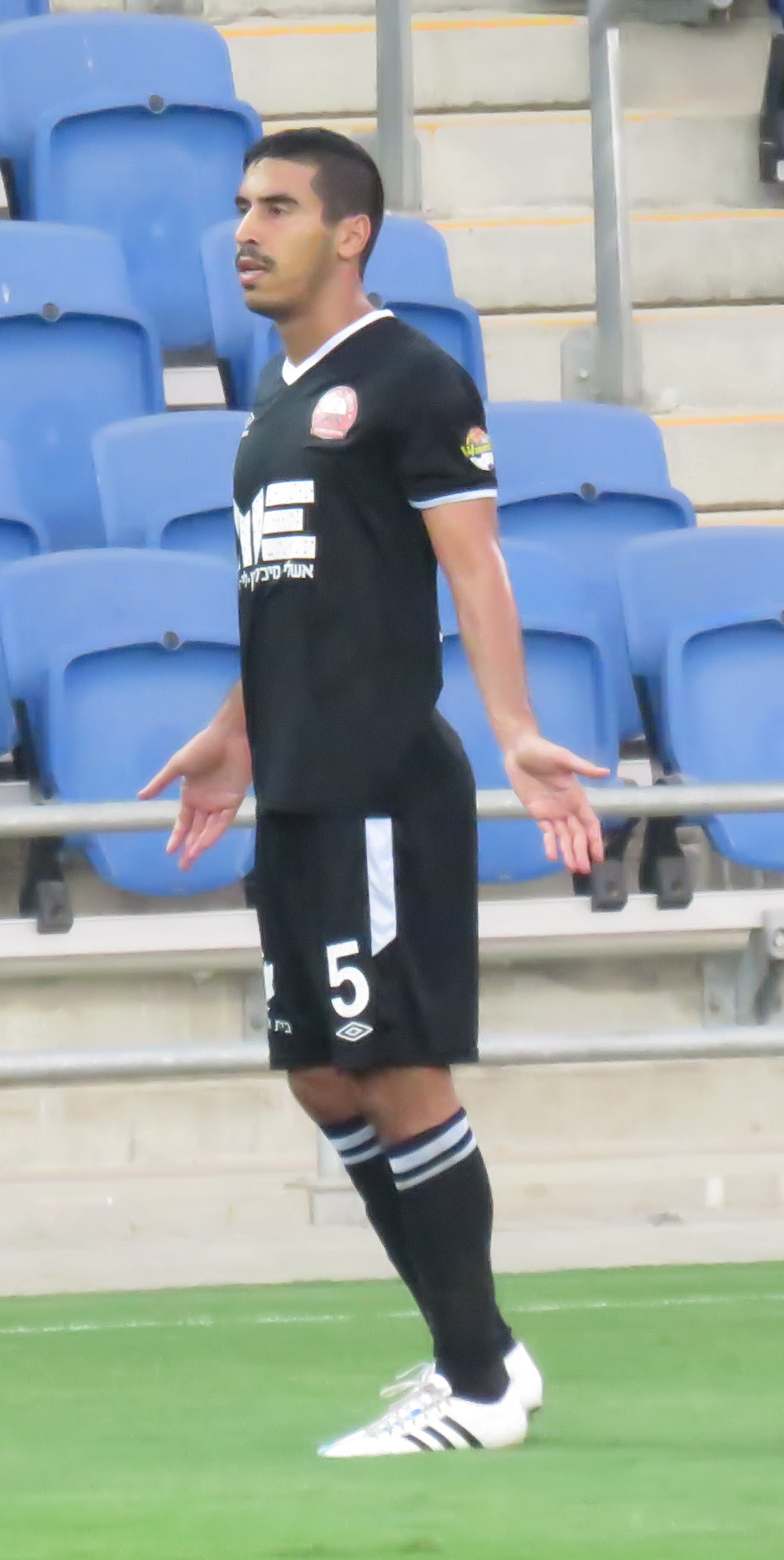
- Nimni playing for Hapoel Ra'anana in 2015

Personal information
- Full name: Adi Nimni
- Date of birth: August 27, 1991 (age 35)
- Place of birth: Kadima-Tzoran, Israel
- Position: Right back

Youth career
- Maccabi Netanya

Senior career*
Years	Team	Apps	(Gls)
2010–2014	Maccabi Netanya	19	(0)
2011–2014	→ Hapoel Ra'anana	85	(3)
2014–2020	Hapoel Ra'anana	142	(4)
2021	Hapoel Ramat Gan	6	(0)
2021–2022	Hapoel Rishon LeZion	23	(0)
2022	F.C. Tira	0	(0)
2022–2023	Maccabi Yavne	21	(0)

International career
2008	Israel U-18	2	(0)
2010	Israel U-21	1	(0)
- * Club domestic league appearances and goals as of 1 June 2022

Adi Nimni (Hebrew: עדי נימני; born 27 August 1991) is an Israeli footballer.

== Honours ==
- Liga Leumit:
  - Runner-up (1): 2012–13
- Toto Cup (Leumit):
  - Runner-up (1): 2012–13

== Club career statistics ==
(correct as of April 2013)

Club	Season	League			Cup			Toto Cup			Europe			Total		
Club	Season	Apps	Goals	Assists	Apps	Goals	Assists	Apps	Goals	Assists	Apps	Goals	Assists	Apps	Goals	Assists
Maccabi Netanya	2009–10	2	0	0	0	0	0	0	0	0	0	0	0	2	0	0
Maccabi Netanya	2010–11	15	0	0	2	0	0	5	0	0	0	0	0	22	0	0
Maccabi Netanya	2011–12	2	0	0	0	0	0	1	0	0	0	0	0	3	0	0
Hapoel Ra'anana (on loan)	2011–12	27	1	0	1	0	0	2	0	0	0	0	0	30	1	0
Hapoel Ra'anana (on loan)	2012–13	30	1	1	3	0	0	6	0	0	0	0	0	39	1	1
Hapoel Ra'anana (on loan)	2013–14	15	0	2	0	0	0	0	0	0	0	0	0	15	0	2
Career		91	2	3	6	0	0	14	0	0	0	0	0	111	2	3
