= List of Israeli football transfers summer 2019 =

This is a list of Israeli football transfers for the 2019 Summer Transfer Window.

== Ligat Ha'Al ==
=== Beitar Jerusalem ===
In:

No.	Pos.	Nation	Player
—	GK	LTU	Ernestas Šetkus (from Hapoel Haifa)
—	GK	ISR	Netanel Daloya (from Maccabi Tzur Shalom, previously loaned)
—	DF	ISR	Maxim Grechkin (from Hapoel Hadera)
—	DF	ISR	Shay Konstantini (from Bnei Yehuda)
—	DF	ISR	Yakir Artzi (from Maccabi Yavne)
—	DF	ISR	Idan Veintrov (from Hakoah Amidar Ramat Gan)
—	DF	POR	Diogo Verdasca (from (Spain) Real Zaragoza)
—	DF	ISR	Uri Magbo (from Ironi Kiryat Shmona)
—	MF	ISR	Liran Rotman (from Maccabi Petah Tikva)
—	MF	TTO	Levi García (from Hapoel Ironi Kiryat Shmona)
—	MF	NIG	Ali Mohamed (from Maccabi Netanya)
—	MF	ISR	Michael Ohana (from Hapoel Be'er Sheva)
—	MF	ISR	Adi Tamir (from Hapoel Katamon)
—	FW	ISR	Shlomi Azulay (from Bnei Sakhnin)
—	FW	ISR	Shalom Edri (from F.C. Tira)
—	FW	GUI	Gideon Akuowua (to F.C. Kafr Qasim)

Out:

No.	Pos.	Nation	Player
—	GK	LTU	Ernestas Šetkus (to Hapoel Be'er Sheva)
—	GK	ISR	David Goresh (Retired)
—	DF	ISR	Samuel Scheimann (to (Netherlands) VVV-Venlo)
—	DF	ISR	Tal Kachila (to (Greece) Atromitos)
—	DF	ISR	Miki Siroshtein (to (Thailand) Suphanburi)
—	DF	ISR	Oz Raly (to Hapoel Umm al-Fahm)
—	DF	ISR	Idan Veintrov (on loan to Hapoel Kfar Shalem)
—	MF	ISR	Yossi Benayoun (Retired)
—	MF	GHA	Anthony Annan (to (Finland) FC Inter Turku)
—	MF	ISR	Lior Inbrum (to Hapoel Tel Aviv)
—	MF	ISR	David Keltjens (to Hapoel Be'er Sheva)
—	MF	ISR	Maor Buzaglo (to Hapoel Tel Aviv)
—	MF	POR	Afonso Taira (to (Romania) Hermannstadt)
—	MF	ISR	Rotam Sastiel (on loan to Shimshon Kafr Qasim)
—	FW	ROU	Mihai Voduț (to (Romania) AFC Chindia Târgoviște)
—	FW	ISR	Roy Fadida (on loan to Hapoel Katamon)
—	FW	ISR	Ya'akov Berihon (to F.C. Ashdod)
—	FW	ISR	Uziel Pardo (on loan to Hapoel Ashkelon)

=== Bnei Yehuda ===
In:

No.	Pos.	Nation	Player
—	DF	ISR	Ori Tzaadon (from Hapoel Afula)
—	DF	ISR	Amir Rustum (from Ironi Nesher)
—	DF	KOS	Alban Pnishi (from Bnei Sakhnin)
—	DF	ISR	Dor Elo (on loan from Hapoel Be'er Sheva)
—	DF	BRA	Allyson (from Maccabi Haifa)
—	MF	ISR	Dor Kochav (from Hapoel Afula)
—	MF	ISR	Ben Shimoni (loan return from Sektzia Nes Tziona)
—	MF	ISR	Eitan Velblum (on loan from Maccabi Haifa)
—	MF	ISR	Ariel Lazmi (from Hakoah Amidar Ramat Gan)
—	FW	ISR	Amit Zenati (from Maccabi Haifa, previously loaned)
—	FW	ISR	Mohammad Ghadir (from Bnei Sakhnin)
—	FW	GAM	Joof Gaira (loan return from (Georgia (country)) FC Dila Gori)
—	FW	ISR	Ben Azubel (from Hapoel Acre)

Out:

No.	Pos.	Nation	Player
—	DF	ISR	Shay Konstantini (to Beitar Jerusalem)
—	DF	ISR	Amit Bitton (loan return to Hapoel Be'er Sheva)
—	DF	ISR	Dean Akafi (to Hapoel Ramat Gan)
—	DF	ESP	Carlos Cuéllar (Free Agent)
—	DF	ISR	Ori Tzaadon (to Ironi Kiryat Shmona)
—	DF	ISR	Daniel Flesher (on loan to Maccabi Petah Tikva)
—	DF	ISR	Nir Gvili (on loan to Hapoel Bnei Lod)
—	MF	ISR	Yuval Ashkenazi (to Maccabi Haifa)
—	MF	ISR	Dolev Haziza (to Maccabi Haifa)
—	MF	ISR	Ilay Elimelech (to Bnei Eilat)
—	MF	ISR	Sean Malka (to Maccabi Yavne)
—	FW	ISR	Netanel Hagani (on loan to Shimshon Tel Aviv)
—	FW	CGO	Mavis Tchibota (to (Bulgaria) Ludogorets)
—	FW	SRB	Fejsal Mulić (to (Slovenia) Mura, previously loaned from Hapoel Tel Aviv)
—	FW	SVK	Jakub Sylvestr (Free Agent)
—	FW	ISR	Liel Tshuva (on loan to Shimshon Tel Aviv)
—	FW	ISR	Sean Buskila (to Bnei Eilat)

=== F.C. Ashdod ===
In:

No.	Pos.	Nation	Player
—	GK	ISR	Ron Shushan (from Hapoel Afula)
—	DF	GHA	Montari Kamaheni (from (Ghana) Dreams)
—	DF	UGA	Timothy Awany (from (Uganda) Kampala City)
—	DF	ISR	Ohad Rabinovic (loan return from Hapoel Nof HaGalil)
—	DF	ISR	Gal Aviv (loan return from Maccabi Kiryat Gat)
—	DF	ISR	David Tiram (from (Romania) Astra Giurgiu)
—	DF	ISR	Roi Shefer (from Maccabi Kabilio Jaffa)
—	MF	GHA	Samuel Alabi (from (Ghana) Dreams)
—	MF	ISR	Naor Abudi (from Hapoel Acre)
—	MF	ISR	Shlomi Azulay (from Maccabi Haifa)
—	MF	ISR	Fares Abu Akel (from Hapoel Iksal)
—	FW	ISR	Elior Mishali (loan return from Hapoel Ashkelon)
—	FW	ISR	Shoval Gozlan (on loan from Maccabi Netanya)
—	FW	ISR	Ya'akov Berihon (from Beitar Jerusalem)
—	FW	ISR	Sagiv Yehezkel (from Maccabi Tel Aviv, previously loaned)

Out:

No.	Pos.	Nation	Player
—	DF	FRA	Johan Martial (to (Greece) Panetolikos)
—	DF	ISR	Aviv Solomon (to Hapoel Kfar Saba)
—	DF	ISR	Yuval Spungin (to Hapoel Marmorek)
—	DF	ISR	Nitay Bitan (to Hakoah Amidar Ramat Gan)
—	DF	ISR	Benel Edri (on loan to Hapoel Ashkelon)
—	MF	ISR	Dan Bitton (to (Bulgaria) Ludogorets)
—	MF	ISR	Ben Reichert (loan return to (Belgium) Zulte Waregen)
—	MF	ISR	Niv Ben Yosef (on loan to Maccabi Kabilio Jaffa)
—	MF	ISR	Yaniv Brik (to Hapoel Rishon LeZion, his player card still belongs to Maccabi Haifa)
—	MF	BFA	Issoumaila Lingane (Free Agent)
—	MF	FRA	Romain Habran (to (Spain) Gimnàstic de Tarragona)
—	MF	ISR	Ori Zohar (on loan to Hakoah Amidar Ramat Gan)
—	MF	ISR	Zohar Avisrur (on loan to Hapoel Iksal)
—	MF	ISR	Osher Amos (on loan to Hapoel Herzliya)
—	FW	NIG	Seybou Koita (Free Agent)
—	FW	SRB	Filip Knežević (to (Serbia) Radnički Niš)
—	FW	ISR	Amran El Krenawy (loan return to Hapoel Be'er Sheva)
—	FW	ISR	Gal Tzroya (to Hapoel Ramat HaSharon)
—	FW	ISR	Elior Mishali (on loan to Hapoel Umm al-Fahm)

=== Hapoel Be'er Sheva ===
In:

No.	Pos.	Nation	Player
—	GK	LTU	Ernestas Šetkus (from Beitar Jerusalem)
—	DF	ISR	Sean Goldberg (from Hapoel Haifa)
—	DF	ISR	Amit Bitton (loan return from Bnei Yehuda)
—	DF	ISR	Or Dadia (loan return from Hapoel Bnei Lod)
—	MF	ISR	Naor Sabag (from Sektzia Nes Tziona)
—	MF	ISR	Gal Levi (from Hapoel Petah Tikva)
—	MF	CRC	Jimmy Marín (from (Costa Rica) Herediano)
—	MF	ISR	Eden Shamir (from Ironi Kiryat Shmona)
—	MF	ISR	David Keltjens (from Beitar Jerusalem)
—	MF	ISR	Ramzi Safouri (from Hapoel Tel Aviv)
—	MF	POR	Josué (from (Turkey) Akhisar Belediyespor)
—	FW	ESP	José Ángel Carrillo (from (Spain) Córdoba)

Out:

No.	Pos.	Nation	Player
—	GK	ISR	Ariel Harush (on loan to (Netherlands) Sparta Rotterdam)
—	GK	ISR	Amit Keren (on loan to Hapoel Acre)
—	DF	ISR	Matan Ohayon (Free Agent)
—	DF	ISR	Ben Turjeman (to Maccabi Netanya)
—	DF	ISR	Hatem Abd Elhamed (to (Scotland) Celtic)
—	DF	ISR	Dor Elo (on loan to Bnei Yehuda)
—	MF	ISR	Michael Ohana (to Beitar Jerusalem)
—	MF	NGR	John Ogu (Free Agent)
—	MF	FRA	Kevin Tapoko (on loan to Hapoel Haifa)
—	MF	SVK	Erik Sabo (to (Turkey) Fatih Karagümrük S.K.)
—	MF	ISR	Hen Ezra (to (Cyprus) AC Omonia)
—	MF	ISR	Noam Dei (on loan to Hakoah Amidar Ramat Gan)
—	FW	ISR	Eden Ben Basat (to Hapoel Haifa)
—	FW	ISR	Amir Khalaila (to (Romania) UTA Arad)
—	FW	ISR	Yagil Ohana (on loan to Hapoel Hadera)

=== Hapoel Hadera ===
In:

No.	Pos.	Nation	Player
—	DF	ISR	Hagay Goldenberg (from Ironi Kiryat Shmona)
—	DF	ISR	Sagiv Solomon (from Hapoel Ramat HaSharon)
—	DF	CIV	Jonathan Cissé (from (France) AS Monaco)
—	DF	ISR	Ashraf Rabah (from Maccabi Ahi Nazareth)
—	DF	ISR	Yarin Hassan (from Hapoel Petah Tikva)
—	DF	ISR	Yahav Gurfinkel (on loan from Maccabi Haifa)
—	MF	ISR	Eilon Elimelech (from Hapoel Umm al-Fahm)
—	MF	ISR	Daniel Solomon (from Beitar Tel Aviv Bat Yam)
—	MF	ISR	Eliel Peretz (from Maccabi Tel Aviv, previously loaned)
—	MF	TOG	Didier Kougbenya (from Maccabi Netanya)
—	MF	ISR	Mohammad Abu Fani (on loan from Maccabi Haifa)
—	FW	ISR	Sagi Dror (from Hapoel Petah Tikva)
—	FW	ISR	Jehonatan Levi (on loan from Hapoel Tel Aviv)
—	FW	ISR	Yagil Ohana (on loan from Hapoel Be'er Sheva)
—	FW	ISR	Yaniv Mizrahi (from Hapoel Ramat HaSharon)
—	FW	ISR	Roei Zikri (on loan from Hapoel Tel Aviv)

Out:

No.	Pos.	Nation	Player
—	GK	ISR	Omer Hanin (to (Germany) Mainz 05)
—	GK	ISR	Adi Tabachnik (to Hapoel Tel Aviv)
—	GK	ISR	Ofir Abarbanel (on loan to F.C. Haifa Robi Shapira)
—	DF	ISR	Maxim Grechkin (to Beitar Jerusalem)
—	DF	ESP	David Mateos (to Hapoel Ra'anana)
—	DF	ISR	Amit Cohen (loan return to Hapoel Ra'anana)
—	DF	ISR	Yarin Peretz (loan return to Hapoel Tel Aviv)
—	DF	ISR	Yakov Ababa (on loan to Hapoel Petah Tikva)
—	DF	ISR	Elias Zana (to Hapoel Kfar Shalem)
—	DF	ISR	Roy Shohat (Free Agent)
—	DF	ISR	Sagiv Solomon (Free Agent)
—	MF	ISR	Eden Kartzev (loan return to Maccabi Tel Aviv)
—	MF	ISR	Vitali Ganon (Free Agent)
—	FW	ISR	Eylon Almog (loan return to Maccabi Tel Aviv)
—	FW	ISR	Dovev Gabay (to Hapoel Umm al-Fahm)
—	FW	NGR	Nathan Oduwa (Free Agent)
—	FW	ISR	Yonatan Elias (to Hakoah Amidar Ramat Gan, his player card still belongs to Hapoel Be'er Sheva)
—	FW	ISR	Awad Amash (on loan to Hapoel Baqa al-Gharbiyye)
—	FW	ISR	Yagil Ohana (to Hapoel Ashkelon, his player card still belongs to Hapoel Be'er Sheva)
—	FW	ISR	Yaniv Mizrahi (to Hapoel Acre)

=== Hapoel Haifa ===
In:

No.	Pos.	Nation	Player
—	GK	BIH	Jasmin Burić (from (Poland) Lech Poznań)
—	GK	ISR	Rotem Fadida (loan return from Maccabi Tzur Shalom)
—	DF	ISR	Ben Vehava (from Hapoel Ra'anana)
—	DF	ISR	Eli Balilty (from Hapoel Nof HaGalil)
—	DF	SRB	Nikola Gulan (from (Belgium) Royal Excel Mouscron)
—	MF	FRA	Kevin Tapoko (on loan from Hapoel Be'er Sheva)
—	MF	GBS	Francisco Júnior (from (Denmark) Vendsyssel FF)
—	MF	ISR	Gidi Kanyuk (from Pakhtakor Tashkent FK)
—	FW	ISR	Aner Shechter (loan return from Hapoel Afula)
—	FW	ISR	Sa'ar Fadida (loan return from Hapoel Rishon LeZion)
—	FW	ISR	Eden Ben Basat (from Hapoel Be'er Sheva)
—	FW	GUY	Emery Welshman (from (United States) Cincinnati)

Out:

No.	Pos.	Nation	Player
—	GK	LTU	Ernestas Šetkus (to Beitar Jerusalem)
—	GK	ISR	Tal Hadar (on loan to Maccabi Ironi Kiryat Ata)
—	DF	MKD	Risto Mitrevski (to (Romania) Sepsi OSK Sfântu Gheorghe)
—	DF	ISR	Sean Goldberg (to Hapoel Be'er Sheva)
—	DF	ROU	Gabriel Tamaș (to (Romania) Astra Giurgiy)
—	DF	ISR	Hen Dilmoni (Free Agent)
—	MF	ISR	Shlomi Azulay (to F.C. Ashdod, previously loaned Maccabi Haifa)
—	MF	SWE	Rasmus Sjöstedt (to (Greece) Panetolikos)
—	MF	ISR	Roei Shukrani (to Hapoel Nof HaGalil, previously loaned to Hapoel Acre)
—	MF	ISR	Ahmad Hujeirat (to Maccabi Ironi Kiryat Ata)
—	MF	ISR	Guy Hadida (Free Agent)
—	FW	ISR	Matan Hozez (loan return to Maccabi Tel Aviv)
—	FW	ISR	Ben Azubel (loan return to Hapoel Acre)
—	FW	MDA	Radu Gînsari (to (Russia) Krylia Sovetov Samara)
—	FW	ISR	Mamoon Qashoua (to Hapoel Ashkelon)
—	FW	ISR	Idan Shemesh (to Hapoel Ra'anana)
—	FW	ISR	Elior Desta (to Maccabi Kiryat Ata, previously loaned to Maccabi Tzur Shalom)
—	FW	ISR	Lior Berkovic (to Hapoel Rishon LeZion)

=== Hapoel Kfar Saba ===
In:

No.	Pos.	Nation	Player
—	DF	ISR	Niran Roteshtein (from Ironi Kiryat Shmona)
—	DF	NGR	Sodiq Atanda (from (Albania) FK Partizani Tirana)
—	DF	ISR	Noam Gamon (on loan from Hapoel Be'er Sheva)
—	DF	ISR	Aviv Solomon (from F.C. Ashdod)
—	DF	ISR	Eliran Saimon (from Hapoel Rishon LeZion)
—	MF	GHA	Ibrahim Moro (Free transfer)
—	MF	ISR	Ayman Kharbat (from (Palestine) Jabal Al-Mukaber)
—	MF	ISR	Liroy Zhairi (from Ironi Kiryat Shmona)
—	MF	GHA	Gershon Koffie (from (Kuwait) Al-Fahaheel FC)
—	MF	ISR	Adrian Rochet (from Hapoel Afula)
—	FW	ISR	Mahmoud Yousef (from (Palestine) Markaz Balata)
—	FW	ISR	Roy Ronen (from Ironi Kiryat Shmona)
—	FW	SEN	Boubacar Traorè (from (Albania) KF Teuta)
—	FW	ISR	Ben Mizan (from Hapoel Marmorek)
—	FW	ISR	Yahav Afriat (loan return from Hapoel Marmorek)
—	FW	HUN	Richárd Vernes (from (Hungary) Diósgyőr)

Out:

No.	Pos.	Nation	Player
—	GK	ISR	Phillip Zmalnikov (to Hapoel Herzliya)
—	DF	ISR	Haim Izrin (to Hapoel Afula)
—	DF	ISR	Lenny Aharon (to (United States) North Carolina Tar Heels)
—	DF	ISR	Omri Mansour (on loan to Maccabi Herzliya)
—	DF	ISR	Maor Gad (to Hakoah Amidar Ramat Gan, previously loaned to Beitar Kfar Saba)
—	MF	ISR	Tomas Prince (loan return to Maccabi Tel Aviv)
—	MF	ISR	Almog Ohayon (to Hapoel Kfar Shalem)
—	MF	ISR	Tomer Sasonker (to Hapoel Ramat HaSharon)
—	MF	ISR	Nirel Mahpud (to Hapoel Bnei Lod)
—	MF	ISR	Stav Nesikovsky (to Hapoel Marmorek)
—	MF	ISR	Omri Shekel (to F.C. Kafr Qasim)
—	MF	ISR	Danny Rozenblit (on loan to Hapoel Herzliya)
—	FW	ISR	Fadi Zidan (to Hapoel Ramat Gan)
—	FW	ISR	Roi Ronen (to Hapoel Ramat HaSharon)

=== Hapoel Ra'anana ===
In:

No.	Pos.	Nation	Player
—	DF	ESP	David Mateos (from Hapoel Hadera)
—	DF	ISR	Amit Cohen (loan return from Hapoel Hadera)
—	DF	ISR	Roei Ashkenazi (from Maccabi Herzliya)
—	MF	ISR	Or Dasa (from Maccabi Tel Aviv, previously loaned)
—	FW	CIV	Yaya Kone (from (Nigeria) Lobi Stars)
—	FW	GHA	Divine Naah (from (Belgium) A.F.C. Tubize)
—	FW	COL	Carlos Rivas (on loan from (United States) New York Red Bulls)
—	FW	ISR	Ahmad Drawshe (from Maccabi Ahi Nazareth)
—	FW	ISR	Idan Shemesh (from Hapoel Haifa)
—	FW	ISR	Lior Berkovic (from Hapoel Rishon LeZion)

Out:

No.	Pos.	Nation	Player
—	DF	ISR	Ben Vehava (to Hapoel Haifa)
—	DF	FRA	Teddy Mézague (Free Agent)
—	DF	ISR	Maor Gerassi (Free Agent)
—	MF	CRO	Mirko Oremuš (to (Bosnia and Herzegovina) FK Sarajevo)
—	MF	ISR	Gil Rahimi (to Hapoel Hod HaSharon)
—	MF	ISR	Roy Alon (to Hapoel Afula)
—	FW	CMR	Ariel Ngueukam (to (Finland) KuPS)
—	FW	CZE	Martin Zeman (to (Czech Republic) 1. FK Příbram)
—	FW	ISR	Ahmad Drawshe (to F.C. Kafr Qasim)

=== Hapoel Tel Aviv ===
In:

No.	Pos.	Nation	Player
—	GK	ISR	Adi Tabachnik (from Hapoel Hadera)
—	DF	ISR	Dani Gruper (from Hapoel Afula)
—	DF	GHA	Ibrahim Imoro (from (Ghana) Karela United)
—	DF	ISR	Yarin Peretz (loan return from Hapoel Hadera)
—	DF	ISR	Eyad Abu Abaid (from Ironi Kiryat Shmona)
—	MF	ISR	Lior Inbrum (from Beitar Jerusalem)
—	MF	ISR	Moti Barshazki (loan return from Maccabi Netanya)
—	MF	ISR	Maor Buzaglo (from Beitar Jerusalem)
—	MF	ISR	Omri Altman (from (Greece) Panathinaikos)
—	MF	GHA	Francis Kyeremeh (from (Serbia) FK Radnik Surdulica)
—	MF	MKD	Stefan Spirovski (from (Hungary) Ferencvárosi TC)
—	FW	DOM	Ronaldo Vásquez (from (Dominican Republic) Atlético Pantoja)
—	FW	ISR	Ali Kna'ana (from Ironi Nesher)
—	FW	NGR	Michael Olaha (from (Vietnam) Song Lam Nghe An)
—	FW	GUI	Demba Camara (from (France) Troyes)

Out:

No.	Pos.	Nation	Player
—	GK	ISR	Robi Levkovich (to (Hungary) Budapest Honvéd)
—	DF	ISR	Amiran Shkalim (Retired)
—	DF	CIV	Ulirch Meleke (loan return to (Finland) Ekenäs IF)
—	DF	NGR	Najib Abudal (to Hapoel Bnei Lod)
—	DF	ISR	Adi Gotlieb (to (Russia) Orenburg)
—	MF	ISR	Ramzi Safouri (to Hapoel Be'er Sheva)
—	MF	BRA	Caio Alves (loan return to Maccabi Haifa)
—	MF	ISR	Tal Levi (on loan to Hapoel Kfar Shalem)
—	MF	ISR	Ofir Takiar (to Hapoel Ramat Gan, previously loaned to Beitar Tel Aviv Bat Yam)
—	MF	ISR	Daniel Kunitsky (on loan to Hapoel Herzliya)
—	MF	BRA	Claudemir (to Hapoel Rishon LeZion)
—	MF	ISR	Yarden Sidi (on loan to Hapoel Ashkelon)
—	MF	ISR	Shay Elias (on loan to Sektzia Nes Tziona)
—	FW	LTU	Nerijus Valskis (to (India) Chennaiyin FC)
—	FW	SRB	Fejsal Mulić (to (Slovenia) Mura, previously loaned to Bnei Yehuda)
—	FW	ISR	Josef Ganda (to (Germany) FC Augsburg)
—	FW	ISR	Roei Zikri (on loan to Hapoel Hadera)

=== Ironi Kiryat Shmona ===
In:

No.	Pos.	Nation	Player
—	DF	ISR	Amir Ben Shimon (from Hapoel Katamon)
—	DF	ISR	Ori Tzaadon (from Bnei Yehuda)
—	DF	ISR	Gal Shish (from Maccbi Petah Tikva)
—	MF	CRC	John Jairo Ruiz (from (Costa Rica) Saprissa)
—	MF	ISR	Shay Golan (on loan from Maccabi Tel Aviv)
—	MF	BRA	Silas (on loan from (Ukraine) Zorya Luhansk)
—	FW	IRL	Cillian Sheridan (from (New Zealand) Wellington Phoenix)
—	FW	NGR	James Adeniyi (on loan from (Azerbaijan) Gabala FK)

Out:

No.	Pos.	Nation	Player
—	DF	ISR	Niran Roteshtein (to Hapoel Kfar Saba)
—	DF	ISR	Hagay Goldenberg (to Hapoel Hadera)
—	DF	ESP	Jorge Morcillo (to (Spain) Recreativo de Huelva)
—	DF	ISR	Kobi Mor (to Hapoel Nof HaGalil)
—	DF	ISR	Uri Magbo (to Beitar Jerusalem)
—	MF	TTO	Levi García (to Beitar Jerusalem)
—	MF	ISR	Eden Shamir (to Hapoel Be'er Sheva)
—	MF	ISR	Liroy Zhairi (to Ironi Kiryat Shmona)
—	MF	ISR	Vladimir Broun (on loan from Ironi Kiryat Shmona)
—	FW	GUI	Hadji Barry (to (Canada) Ottawa Fury)
—	FW	ISR	Roi Ronen (to Hapoel Kfar Saba)
—	FW	ISR	Rotem Hatuel (to Hapoel Ramat HaSharon, previously loaned to Hapoel Acre)
—	FW	ISR	Shimon Abuhatzira (to Ironi Kiryat Shmona)
—	FW	ISR	Danny Amar (to Hapoel Bu'eine)

=== Maccabi Haifa ===
In:

No.	Pos.	Nation	Player
—	GK	ISR	Josh Cohen (from (United States) Sacramento Republic)
—	DF	NGR	Ikouwem Udo (from (Nigeria) Enyimba International)
—	DF	GAM	Turai Seahaw (from Beitar Nes Tubruk)
—	DF	ISR	Yahav Gurfinkel (loan return from Hapoel Nof HaGalil)
—	DF	AUS	Trent Sainsbury (from (Netherlands) PSV Eindhoven)
—	MF	ISR	Yuval Ashkenazi (from Bnei Yehuda)
—	MF	ISR	Dolev Haziza (from Bnei Yehuda)
—	MF	NED	Tjaronn Chery (from (China) Guizhou Hengfeng)
—	MF	CMR	Jeando Fuchs (from (Spain) Deportivo Alavés)
—	FW	ISR	Gil Itzhak (from Hapoel Rishon LeZion)
—	FW	NED	Yanic Wildschut (from (England) Norwich City)

Out:

No.	Pos.	Nation	Player
—	GK	ISR	Omri Glazer (on loan to Sektzia Nes Tziona)
—	DF	NED	Etiënne Reijnen (to (Netherlands) PEC Zwolle)
—	DF	GAM	Abubakar Barry (to Hapoel Nof HaGalil)
—	DF	ISR	Mahmmoud Jaber (on loan to Hapoel Nof HaGalil)
—	DF	ISR	Peter Elias (to Agudat Sport Ashdod, previously loaned to Hapoel Marmorek)
—	DF	ISR	Yahav Gurfinkel (on loan to Hapoel Hadera)
—	DF	BRA	Allyson (to Bnei Yehuda)
—	MF	CHI	Manuel Iturra (to (Chile) Deportes Iquique)
—	MF	ISR	Gal Alberman (retired)
—	MF	ISR	Roi Kahat (to Maccabi Netanya)
—	MF	ISR	Shlomi Azulay (to F.C. Ashdod, previously loaned to Hapoel Haifa)
—	MF	BRA	Caio Alves (Free Agent)
—	MF	ISR	Mohammad Abu Fani (on loan to Hapoel Hadera)
—	MF	GAM	Turai Seahaw (on loan to Sektzia Nes Tziona)
—	FW	ISR	Shon Weissman (to (Austria) Wolfsberger AC)
—	FW	ISR	Amit Zenati (to Bnei Yehuda, previously loaned)
—	FW	GUI	Seydouba Soumah (loan return to (Serbia) FK Partizan)
—	FW	ISR	Ofir Mizrahi (to Sektzia Nes Tziona)
—	FW	ISR	Guy Dahan (on loan to Hapoel Nof HaGalil)
—	FW	ISR	Gil Itzhak (on loan to Hapoel Rishon LeZion)
—	FW	ISR	Shadi Masarwa (on loan to Hapoel Acre)

=== Maccabi Netanya ===
In:

No.	Pos.	Nation	Player
—	GK	ISR	Raz Karmi (from Hapoel Bnei Lod)
—	DF	ISR	Yuval Sade (from Hapoel Ramat HaSharon)
—	DF	ESP	Román Golobart (from (Cyprus) Nea Salamis)
—	DF	ISR	Tzlil Nehemia (from Sektzia Nes Tziona)
—	DF	ISR	Ben Turjeman (from Hapoel Be'er Sheva)
—	DF	ESP	Borja Herrera (from (Spain) Albacete)
—	MF	ISR	Roi Kahat (from Maccabi Haifa)
—	MF	ISR	Almog Cohen (from (Germany) FC Ingolstadt 04)
—	FW	ISR	Ron Ashkenazi (from Hapoel Ramat HaSharon)

Out:

No.	Pos.	Nation	Player
—	GK	ISR	Amit Marijan (on loan to Maccabi Tzur Shalom)
—	DF	CRO	Branko Vrgoč (to (Cyprus) Anorthosis)
—	DF	ISR	Naftali Belay (on loan to Hapoel Petah Tikva)
—	DF	ISR	David Tiram (to (Romania) Astra Giurgiu)
—	DF	ISR	Dudu Twito (to Maccabi Netanya)
—	DF	USA	Jonathan Bornstein (to (United States) Chicago Fire)
—	MF	ISR	Moti Barshazki (loan return to Hapoel Tel Aviv)
—	MF	ISR	Eylon Yerushalmi (on loan to Sektzia Nes Tziona)
—	MF	NIG	Ali Mohamed (to Beitar Jerusalem)
—	MF	ISR	Ra'am Johajha (on loan to Hapoel Umm al-Fahm)
—	MF	TOG	Didier Kougbenya (to Hapoel Hadera, previously loaned to (Georgia (country)) Dila Gori)
—	MF	ISR	Elad Shahaf (on loan to Sektzia Nes Tziona)
—	MF	ISR	Shadi Kabha (on loan to Hapoel Baqa al-Gharbiyye)
—	MF	ISR	Paz Belander (on loan to Hapoel Asi Gilboa)

=== Maccabi Tel Aviv ===
In:

No.	Pos.	Nation	Player
—	GK	GRE	Andreas Gianniotis (from (Greece) Olympiacos)
—	DF	POR	André Geraldes (on loan from (Portugal) Sporting CP)
—	MF	ISR	Tomas Prince (loan return from Hapoel Kfar Saba)
—	MF	ISR	Eden Kartzev (loan return from Hapoel Hadera)
—	FW	ISR	Matan Hozez (loan return from Hapoel Haifa)
—	FW	ISR	Eylon Almog (loan return from Hapoel Hadera)
—	FW	ISR	Guy Shetach (loan return from Hapoel Ramat HaSharon)
—	FW	GHA	Prince Okraku (on loan from (Ghana) Dreams)
—	FW	BRB	Nick Blackman (from (England) Derby County)

Out:

No.	Pos.	Nation	Player
—	GK	SRB	Predrag Rajković (to (France) Stade de Reims)
—	GK	ISR	Daniel Peretz (on loan to Beitar Tel Aviv Bat Yam)
—	GK	ISR	Sahar Hasson (on loan to Hapoel Ramat HaSharon, previously loaned)
—	DF	ISR	Alon Shtrozberg (on loan to Beitar Tel Aviv Bat Yam)
—	DF	ISR	Amit Glazer (on loan to Beitar Tel Aviv Bat Yam)
—	DF	ISR	Michael Chilaka (on loan to Beitar Tel Aviv Bat Yam)
—	DF	ISR	Tomer Machluf (on loan to Beitar Tel Aviv Bat Yam)
—	DF	ISR	Eli Dasa (to (Netherlands) Vitesse)
—	MF	ISR	Tamir Glazer (on loan to Beitar Tel Aviv Bat Yam)
—	MF	ISR	Yoav Hofmeister (on loan to Beitar Tel Aviv Bat Yam)
—	MF	ISR	Eyal Hen (on loan to Beitar Tel Aviv Bat Yam)
—	MF	ISR	Omer Barami (on loan to Beitar Tel Aviv Bat Yam)
—	MF	ISR	Younes Jabarin (to Hapoel Umm al-Fahm, previously loaned to Beitar Tel Aviv Bat Yam)
—	MF	ISR	Or Dasa (to Hapoel Ra'anana, previously loaned)
—	MF	ISR	Eliel Peretz (to Hapoel Hadera, previously loaned)
—	MF	ISR	Ido Shahar (on loan to Beitar Tel Aviv Bat Yam)
—	MF	ISR	Mofleh Shala'ata (on loan to Beitar Tel Aviv Bat Yam)
—	MF	ISR	Bar Cohen (on loan to Beitar Tel Aviv Bat Yam)
—	FW	PAN	Eduardo Guerrero (on loan to Beitar Tel Aviv Bat Yam)
—	FW	GHA	Prince Okraku (on loan to Beitar Tel Aviv Bat Yam)
—	FW	ISR	Sagiv Yehezkel (to F.C. Ashdod, previously loaned)
—	FW	ISR	Amir Berkovits (on loan to Beitar Tel Aviv Bat Yam)

=== Sektzia Nes Tziona ===
In:

No.	Pos.	Nation	Player
—	GK	ISR	Omri Glazer (on loan from Maccabi Haifa)
—	DF	CGO	Romaric Etou (from Beitar Tel Aviv Bat Yam)
—	DF	ISR	Raz Nachmias (on loan from Hapoel Tel Aviv)
—	DF	ISR	Yonatan Levi (on loan from Maccabi Haifa)
—	DF	ISR	Noam Cohen (on loan from Maccabi Tel Aviv)
—	DF	BEL	Dries Wuytens (from (Netherlands) Sparta Rotterdam)
—	DF	ISR	Francisco Dutari (from (Argentina) Central Córdoba)
—	MF	ALB	Sabien Lilaj (from (Azerbaijan) Gabala)
—	MF	ISR	Eylon Yerushalmi (on loan from Maccabi Netanya)
—	MF	ISR	Guy Badash (on loan from Hapoel Tel Aviv)
—	MF	ISR	Ido Sharon (from Hapoel Ramat Gan, previously loaned)
—	MF	GAM	Turai Seahaw (on loan from Maccabi Haifa)
—	MF	ISR	Elad Shahaf (on loan from Maccabi Netanya)
—	FW	ISR	Ofir Mizrahi (from Maccabi Haifa)
—	FW	ISR	David Boysen (from (Sweden) Helsingborg)

Out:

No.	Pos.	Nation	Player
—	GK	ISR	Amit Shemesh (to Agudat Sport Nordia Jerusalem)
—	DF	ISR	Guy Aviv (to Hapoel Katamon)
—	DF	ISR	Ahmed Shaban (to Hapoel Rishon LeZion)
—	DF	ISR	Tzlil Nehemia (to Maccabi Netanya)
—	DF	ISR	Ron Gabay (to Hapoel Azor)
—	MF	ISR	Naor Sabag (to Hapoel Be'er Sheva)
—	MF	ISR	Ben Shimoni (loan return to Bnei Yehuda)
—	MF	ISR	Offir Hemo (to Hapoel Marmorek)
—	MF	ISR	Adar Awat (to Hapoel Ashkelon, his player card still belongs to F.C. Ashdod)
—	MF	ISR	Daniel Trua (on loan to Hapoel Rishon LeZion)
—	MF	ISR	Benny Natan (to Hapoel Afula, his player card still belongs to Hapoel Be'er Sheva)
—	FW	ISR	Ido Exbard (to Hapoel Marmorek)
—	FW	ISR	Matan Beit Ya'akov (to F.C. Ironi Or Yehuda)
—	FW	ISR	Roi Ben Basat (to Maccabi Yavne)
—	FW	ISR	Shoval Baruch (on loan to Maccabi Sha'arayim)

== Liga Leumit ==
=== Beitar Tel Aviv Bat Yam ===
In:

No.	Pos.	Nation	Player
—	GK	ISR	Daniel Peretz (on loan from Maccabi Tel Aviv)
—	GK	ISR	Avid Miara (from Maccabi Kiryat Gat)
—	DF	ISR	Alon Shtrozberg (on loan from Maccabi Tel Aviv)
—	DF	ISR	Amit Glazer (on loan from Maccabi Tel Aviv)
—	DF	ISR	Michael Chilaka (on loan from Maccabi Tel Aviv)
—	DF	ISR	Tomer Machluf (on loan from Maccabi Tel Aviv)
—	DF	ISR	Yarin Sarig (from Hakoah Amidar Ramat Gan)
—	MF	ISR	Tamir Glazer (on loan from Maccabi Tel Aviv)
—	MF	ISR	Eyal Hen (on loan from Maccabi Tel Aviv)
—	MF	ISR	Omer Barami (on loan from Maccabi Tel Aviv)
—	MF	ISR	Bar Cohen (on loan from Maccabi Tel Aviv)
—	MF	ISR	Yoav Hofmeister (on loan from Maccabi Tel Aviv)
—	MF	ISR	Ido Shahar (on loan from Maccabi Tel Aviv)
—	MF	ISR	Mofleh Shala'ata (on loan from Maccabi Tel Aviv)
—	MF	ISR	Abed al-Salama (from Hapoel Bnei Lod)
—	FW	PAN	Eduardo Guerrero (on loan from Maccabi Tel Aviv)
—	FW	GHA	Prince Okraku (on loan from Maccabi Tel Aviv)
—	FW	ISR	Amir Berkovits (on loan from Maccabi Tel Aviv)
—	FW	ISR	Dor Moskovich (from Maccabi Herzliya)

Out:

No.	Pos.	Nation	Player
—	GK	ISR	Aviad Katlan (to Maccabi Ironi Ashdod)
—	DF	CGO	Romaric Etou (to Sektzia Nes Tziona)
—	DF	ISR	Eden Ben Simhon (to Maccabi Sha'arayim)
—	DF	ISR	Noam Cohen (to Sektzia Nes Tziona, his player card still belongs to Maccabi Tel Aviv)
—	DF	ISR	Amran Abu Janam (on loan to F.C. Ramla)
—	MF	ISR	Younes Jabarin (to Hapoel Umm al-Fahm, previously loaned from Maccabi Tel Aviv)
—	MF	ISR	Amit Shapira (to Nordia Jerusalem)
—	MF	ISR	Shay Golan (to Ironi Kiryat Shmona, his player card still belongs to Maccabi Tel Aviv)
—	MF	ISR	Guy Badash (to Sektzia Nes Tziona, his player card still belongs to Hapoel Tel Aviv)
—	MF	ISR	Daniel Solomon (to Hapoel Hadera)
—	MF	ISR	Ofir Takiar (to Hapoel Ramat Gan, previously loaned from Hapoel Tel Aviv)
—	MF	TOG	Balgou Yendountie (to (Georgia (country)) Dila Gori)
—	MF	ISR	Ziv Albach (to Hapoel Herzliya)
—	FW	ISR	Omer Buaron (to Hapoel Petah Tikva)
—	FW	ISR	Anas Mahamid (to (Switzerland) FC Winterthur)
—	FW	ISR	Walid Darwish (to Maccabi Tzur Shalom)
—	FW	ISR	Daniel Agami (to Hapoel Herzliya)

=== Bnei Sakhnin ===
In:

No.	Pos.	Nation	Player
—	DF	ISR	Ayman Hamza (loan return from F.C. Haifa Robi Shapira)
—	DF	GAB	Gilchrist Nguema (from Benfica de Macau)
—	MF	ISR	Moti Malka (from Hapoel Ramat HaSharon)

Out:

No.	Pos.	Nation	Player
—	GK	ISR	Matan Amber (to Hapoel Rishon LeZion)
—	DF	UKR	Oleksandr Stetsenko (Free Agent)
—	DF	KOS	Alban Pnishi (to Bnei Yehuda)
—	DF	ZAM	Emmanuel Mbola (Free Agent)
—	MF	ISR	Yisrael Zaguri (to Maccabi Petah Tikva)
—	MF	ISR	Atef Mousa (to Ironi Bnei Kabul)
—	MF	ISR	Mohammed Ayasha (to Hapoel Bnei Ar'ara 'Ara, previously loaned to Hapoel Kafr Kanna)
—	FW	ISR	Shlomi Azulay (to Beitar Jerusalem)
—	FW	NGR	Shuaibu Ibrahim (loan return to (Norway) FK Haugesund)
—	FW	ISR	Mohammad Ghadir (to Bnei Yehuda)
—	FW	ISR	Mohammed Kalibat (to Hapoel Rishon LeZion)
—	FW	ISR	Mohammed Shaaban (on loan to Hapoel Bnei Zalafa)

=== F.C. Kafr Qasim ===
In:

No.	Pos.	Nation	Player
—	GK	ISR	Tamir Lalou (on loan from Beitar Jerusalem)
—	DF	ISR	Gil Sellam (from Hakoah Amidar Ramat Gan)
—	DF	ISR	Sagiv Cohen (from Hapoel Rishon LeZion)
—	DF	ISR	Itzik Shoolmayster (on loan from Hapoel Tel Aviv)
—	DF	ISR	Alon Azugi (from Hapoel Acre)
—	DF	ISR	Amid Mahajna (from Hapoel Acre)
—	DF	ISR	Mohammed Hindy (from Hapoel Iksal)
—	DF	ISR	Mohammed Farij (from (Palestine) Hilal Al-Quds)
—	MF	ISR	Elian Rohana (from Hapoel Acre)
—	MF	ISR	Mohammed Abu Ras (from (Palestine) Shabab Al-Khalil)
—	MF	ISR	Idan David (from Hapoel Afula)
—	MF	ISR	Mustafa Sheikh Yosef (from Shimshon Bnei Tayibe)
—	MF	ISR	Omri Shekel (from Hapoel Kfar Saba)
—	FW	ISR	Mohammed Badir (from Shimshon Kafr Qasim)
—	FW	GHA	Latif Amadu (from (Albania) KF Teuta)
—	FW	ISR	Mor Fadida (from F.C. Kafr Qasim)
—	FW	GUI	Gideon Akuowua (from Beitar Jerusalem)
—	FW	ISR	Ahmed Drawshe (from Hapoel Ra'anana)

Out:

No.	Pos.	Nation	Player
—	GK	ISR	Maniv Sarsour (to Hapoel Kafr Qasim)
—	DF	ISR	Guy Gomberg (to Hapoel Marmorek)
—	DF	ISR	Assaf Cohen (to Hapoel Azor)
—	DF	ISR	Iham Abdah (loan return to Maccabi Ahi Nazareth)
—	DF	ISR	Mohammed Farij (to Shimshon Kafr Qasim)
—	MF	ISR	Ohad Edelstein (to Hapoel Marmorek)
—	MF	ISR	Alon Sultan (to Hapoel Marmorek)
—	FW	ISR	Shahar Balilti (to Hapoel Bik'at HaYarden)
—	FW	ISR	Mustapha Murab (to Shimshon Kafr Qasim)

=== Hapoel Acre ===
In:

No.	Pos.	Nation	Player
—	GK	ISR	Amit Keren (on loan from Hapoel Be'er Sheva)
—	DF	ISR	Eitan Ratson (from Hapoel Iksal)
—	DF	ISR	Yakov Mizrahi (from Nordia Jerusalem)
—	DF	ISR	Alaa Jafar (from Hapoel Iksal)
—	DF	ISR	Anwar Murad (from Hapoel Ramat HaSharon)
—	DF	ISR	Ohad Elbilia (on loan from Hapoel Haifa)
—	MF	ISR	Diego Nicolaievsky (from Hapoel Marmorek)
—	MF	ISR	Wahib Habiballah (from Hapoel Iksal)
—	MF	ISR	Hen Yadan (from Ironi Tiberias)
—	MF	ISR	George Diba (from Maccabi Tzur Shalom)
—	FW	ISR	Ben Azubel (loan return from Hapoel Haifa)
—	FW	ISR	Itay Moreno (loan return from F.C. Haifa Robi Shapira)
—		ISR	Shadi Masarwa (on loan from Maccabi Haifa)
—	FW	ISR	Yaniv Mizrahi (from Hapoel Hadera)

Out:

No.	Pos.	Nation	Player
—	GK	ISR	Rom Iluz (to Hapoel Baqa al-Gharbiyye)
—	GK	ISR	Omer Tal (on loan to Ironi Tiberias)
—	GK	ISR	Tom Almadon (to Maccabi Tamra)
—	DF	ISR	Ofek Fishler (to Hapoel Nof HaGalil, his player card still belongs to Hapoel Acre)
—	DF	ISR	Alon Azugi (to F.C. Kafr Qasim)
—	DF	ISR	Amid Mahajna (to F.C. Kafr Qasim)
—	DF	ISR	Or Hasin (to Ahi Acre, previously loaned to Beitar Nahariya)
—	MF	ISR	Roei Shukrani (to Hapoel Nof HaGalil, previously loaned from Hapoel Haifa)
—	MF	ISR	Elian Rohana (to F.C. Kafr Qasim)
—	MF	ISR	Naor Abudi (to F.C. Ashdod)
—	MF	ISR	Adi Konstantinos (to Hapoel Ashkelon)
—	MF	ISR	Bashar Salama (to Ihud Bnei Majd al-Krum)
—	MF	ISR	Bassel Salama (to Ihud Bnei Majd al-Krum)
—	MF	ISR	Yarin Haliva (on loan to Maccabi Tzur Shalom)
—	FW	ISR	Elior Seiderre (to Hapoel Afula)
—	FW	ISR	Rotem Hatuel (to Hapoel Ramat HaSharon, previously loaned from Ironi Kiryat Shmona)
—	FW	ISR	Ben Azubel (to Bnei Yehuda)
—	FW	ISR	Elad Elgazar (to Ahi Acre, previously loaned to Beitar Nahariya)

=== Hapoel Afula ===
In:

No.	Pos.	Nation	Player
—	DF	ISR	Haim Izrin (from Hapoel Kfar Saba)
—	DF	ISR	Emri Zaid (from Maccabi Ahi Nazareth)
—	DF	ISR	Shinhar Murad (loan return from F.C. Haifa Robi Shapira)
—	DF	ISR	Yuval Yosipovich (from Hapoel Iksal)
—	MF	ISR	Ohad Hazut (from Hapoel Ramat HaSharon)
—	MF	ISR	Benny Natan (on loan from Hapoel Be'er Sheva)
—	FW	ISR	Yuval Shawat (from Hapoel Nof HaGalil)
—	FW	ISR	Elior Seiderre (from Hapoel Acre)

Out:

No.	Pos.	Nation	Player
—	GK	ISR	Ron Shushan (to F.C. Ashdod)
—	GK	ISR	Shaked Nachmani (to F.C. Haifa Robi Shapira)
—	DF	ISR	Dani Gruper (to Hapoel Tel Aviv)
—	DF	ISR	Ori Tzaadon (to Bnei Yehuda)
—	DF	ISR	Noam Gamon (to Hapoel Kfar Saba)
—	DF	ISR	Haim Izrin (to Hapoel Rishon LeZion)
—	MF	ISR	Dor Kochav (to Bnei Yehuda)
—	MF	ISR	Idan David (to F.C. Kafr Qasim)
—	MF	CRO	Jurica Grgec (to (Armenia) FC Urartu)
—	MF	ISR	Or Eliyahu (to Hapoel Bik'at HaYarden)
—	MF	ISR	Jan Feldman (on loan to Maccabi Kiryat Ata)
—	MF	ISR	Adrian Rochet (to Hapoel Kfar Saba)
—	FW	ISR	Aner Shechter (loan return to Hapoel Haifa)
—	FW	ISR	Tomer Swisa (to Hapoel Nof HaGalil)
—	FW	ISR	Daniel Peretz (to Hapoel Iksal)
—	FW	ISR	Matan Nachmani (on loan to Ironi Tiberias)

=== Hapoel Ashkelon ===
In:

No.	Pos.	Nation	Player
—	GK	ISR	Aviram Ziat (from Shimshon Bnei Tayibe)
—	GK	ISR	Ofek Ivri (on loan from Beitar Jerusalem)
—	DF	ISR	Orel Horev (from Nordia Jerusalem)
—	DF	ISR	Shay Moshel (on loan from F.C. Ashdod)
—	DF	ISR	Mohammed Shamay (from Ironi Nesher)
—	DF	ISR	Adar Awat (on loan from F.C. Ashdod)
—	DF	ISR	Netanel Moris (on loan from Beitar Nes Tubruk)
—	MF	ISR	Roy Dayan (on loan from Hapoel Tel Aviv)
—	MF	ISR	Adi Konstantinos (from Hapoel Acre)
—	MF	ISR	Yarden Sidi (on loan from Hapoel Tel Aviv)
—	MF	ISR	Matan Dahadi (from Hapoel Kfar Shalem)
—	FW	ISR	Mamoon Qashoua (from Hapoel Haifa)
—	FW	ISR	Nuriel Buzaglo (from Maccabi Kabilio Jaffa)
—	FW	ISR	Itay Levi (on loan from Hapoel Petah Tikva)
—	FW	ISR	Uziel Pardo (on loan from Beitar Jerusalem)
—	FW	BRA	Júlio César (from Hapoel Nof HaGalil)
—	FW	ISR	Yagil Ohana (on loan from Hapoel Be'er Sheva)
—	FW	ISR	Avi Butbul (from F.C. Ashdod)

Out:

No.	Pos.	Nation	Player
—	GK	ISR	Yair Hadar (on loan to Maccabi Kiryat Malakhi)
—	DF	ISR	Ben Zhairi (to Hapoel Umm al-Fahm)
—	DF	ISR	Tomer Levy (to Maccabi Petah Tikva)
—	DF	ISR	Omri Luzon (to Hapoel Rishon LeZion)
—	DF	LTU	Tadas Kijanskas (to Hapoel Umm al-Fahm)
—	DF	ISR	Amit Buhbut (on loan to Maccabi Ironi Netivot)
—	DF	ISR	Mohammed Shamay (on loan to F.C. Daburiyya)
—	DF	ISR	Artyum Meshtnir (on loan to Maccabi Kiryat Gat)
—	MF	GRE	Sotiris Ninis (Free Agent)
—	MF	ISR	Eran Biton (Free Agent)
—	MF	ISR	Or Hasidim (to Hapoel Umm al-Fahm)
—	FW	ISR	Elior Mishali (loan return to F.C. Ashdod)
—	FW	ISR	Assi Guma (to Hapoel Ramat Gan, his player card still belongs to Hapoel Hadera)
—	FW	ISR	Oz Peretz (to Hapoel Petah Tikva)
—	FW	ISR	Yehonatan Kabilis (on loan to Maccabi Ironi Netivot)

=== Hapoel Bnei Lod ===
In:

No.	Pos.	Nation	Player
—	DF	ISR	Basel Taha (on loan from Hapoel Ra'anana)
—	DF	ISR	Idan Mikdash (from Hapoel Baqa al-Gharbiyye)
—	DF	ISR	David Abidor (from Hapoel Petah Tikva)
—	DF	NGR	Najib Abdul (from Hapoel Tel Aviv)
—	MF	ISR	Yossi Sallallich (from Maccabi Kabilio Jaffa)
—	MF	ISR	Elad Boaron (from Hapoel Baqa al-Gharbiyye)
—	MF	ISR	Nirel Mahpud (from Hapoel Kfar Saba)
—	FW	ISR	Ayub Abu Sabit (from Shimshon Kafr Qasim)
—	FW	ISR	Abdallah Shaaban (from Shimshon Kafr Qasim)
—	FW	ISR	Musa Tarabin (on loan from Hapoel Iksal)
—	FW	ISR	Amir Khalaila (from (Romania) UTA Arad)

Out:

No.	Pos.	Nation	Player
—	GK	ISR	Raz Karmi (to Maccabi Netanya)
—	DF	ISR	Maoz Samia (to Hapoel Ramat HaSharon)
—	DF	CIV	Ulrich Meleke (loan return to Hapoel Tel Aviv)
—	DF	ISR	Or Dadia (loan return to Hapoel Be'er Sheva)
—	DF	ISR	Nir Gvili (on loan from Bnei Yehuda)
—	MF	ISR	Tomas Mounier (to Hapoel Lod)
—	MF	ISR	Hen Reuven (to Nordia Jerusalem)
—	MF	ISR	Abed al-Salama (to Beitar Tel Aviv Bat Yam)
—	MF	ISR	Dor Malichi (to Hapoel Rishon LeZion)
—	MF	ISR	Mishel Huri (to Bnei Jaffa)
—	MF	ISR	Tal Ben Abu (to Ironi Beit Dagan)
—	FW	ISR	Abdallah Shaaban (to Shimshon Kafr Qasim)
—	FW	ISR	Tomer Hagag (to Hapoel Lod)

=== Hapoel Katamon ===
In:

No.	Pos.	Nation	Player
—	GK	ISR	Ben Weitzman (from Hapoel Rishon LeZion)
—	DF	ISR	Yonatan Rodionov (from Hapoel Ramat HaSharon)
—	DF	ISR	Guy Aviv (from Sektzia Nes Tziona)
—	DF	ISR	Gal Mayo (from Hapoel Ramat HaSharon)
—	DF	ISR	Sahar Brown (Free transfer)
—	DF	ISR	Yurai Maliah (on loan from Beitar Jerusalem)
—	MF	ISR	Sharon Zisso (from Hapoel Ramat HaSharon)
—	MF	ISR	Eyal Danin (from Hapoel Nof HaGalil)
—	MF	ISR	Daniel Gretz (from Hapoel Ramat Gan)
—	FW	ISR	Roy Fadida (on loan from Beitar Jerusalem)
—	FW	ISR	Roy Melika (from Hapoel Petah Tikva)

Out:

No.	Pos.	Nation	Player
—	GK	ISR	Barak Levi (to Hapoel Petah Tikva)
—	DF	ISR	Amir Ben Shimon (to Ironi Kiryat Shmona)
—	DF	ISR	Yogev Lerman (to Hapoel Ramat HaSharon)
—	DF	ISR	Daniel Busi (loan return to Maccabi Petah Tikva)
—	DF	ISR	Mohammed Farij (on loan to F.C. Kafr Qasim)
—	DF	ISR	Noam Heftzedi (to Hapoel Kfar Shalem, his player card still belongs to Beitar Jerusalem)
—	DF	ISR	Shaked Amsalem (on loan to Hapoel Kfar Shalem)
—	DF	ISR	Liron Moshe (on loan to Beitar Ironi Ma'ale Adumim)
—	DF	ISR	Yonatan Rodionov (on loan to Maccabi Herzliya)
—	MF	ISR	Adi Tamir (to Beitar Jerusalem)
—	MF	ISR	Michael Maman (to Hapoel Rishon LeZion)
—	MF	ISR	Eden Dahan (to Hapoel Rishon LeZion, his player card stiil belongs to Beitar Nes Tubruk)
—	FW	ISR	Eden Shrem (to Sektzia Nes Tziona)

=== Hapoel Nof HaGalil ===
In:

No.	Pos.	Nation	Player
—	GK	ISR	Roee Fucs (on loan from Maccabi Haifa)
—	DF	ISR	Kobi Mor (from Ironi Kiryat Shmona)
—	DF	ISR	Eyal Malul (from Beitar Nes Tubruk)
—	DF	ISR	Ofek Fishler (on loan from Hapoel Haifa)
—	DF	GAM	Abubakar Barry (from Maccabi Haifa)
—	DF	ISR	Mahmmoud Jaber (on loan from Maccabi Haifa)
—	DF	ISR	Oded Elkayam (from Maccabi Petah Tikva)
—	MF	ISR	Vyacheslav Orchov (loan return from Ironi Tiberias)
—	MF	ISR	Roei Shukrani (from Hapoel Haifa)
—	FW	ISR	Tomer Swisa (from Hapoel Afula)
—	FW	ISR	Guy Dahan (on loan from Maccabi Haifa)
—	FW	ISR	Idan Golan (from Hapoel Ramat Gan)

Out:

No.	Pos.	Nation	Player
—	GK	ISR	Avi Ivgi (to Hapoel Marmorek)
—	DF	ISR	Eli Balilty (to Hapoel Haifa)
—	DF	ISR	Yahav Gurfinkel (loan return to Maccabi Haifa)
—	DF	ISR	Ofer Verta (to Hapoel Ramat Gan)
—	DF	ISR	Yonatan Levi (to Sektzia Nes Tziona, his player card still belongs to Maccabi Haifa)
—	DF	ISR	Ohad Rabinovic (loan return to F.C. Ashdod)
—	DF	ISR	Alon Netzer (to (Romania) Academica Clinceni)
—	DF	ISR	Ali Dahla (on loan to Ironi Tiberias)
—	DF	ISR	Achlau Deres (on loan to Maccabi Kiryat Ata)
—	DF	ISR	Nadav Moseinko (on loan to Maccabi Kiryat Ata)
—	DF	ISR	Ayman Ali (to Ironi Tiberias)
—	MF	ISR	Eyal Danin (to Hapoel Katamon)
—	MF	ISR	Avishay Gata (on loan to Maccabi Ironi Kiryat Ata)
—	MF	ISR	Vyacheslav Orchov (on loan to Maccabi Kiryat Ata)
—	MF	ISR	Ido Aharon (to Hapoel Bik'at HaYarden)
—	FW	ISR	Yuval Shawat (to Hapoel Afula)
—	FW	ISR	Jehonathan Levi (to Hapoel Hadera, his player card still belongs to Hapoel Tel Aviv)
—	FW	ISR	Itamar Gata (on loan to Maccabi Tzur Shalom)
—	FW	BRA	Júlio César (from Hapoel Ashkelon)

=== Hapoel Petah Tikva ===
In:

No.	Pos.	Nation	Player
—	GK	ISR	Barak Levi (from Hapoel Katamon)
—	DF	ISR	Yosef Awadi (from Hapoel Umm al-Fahm)
—	DF	ISR	Bar Ivgi (from Maccabi Herzliya)
—	DF	ISR	Naftali Belay (on loan from Maccabi Netanya)
—	DF	ISR	Yakov Ababa (on loan from Hapoel Hadera)
—	MF	ISR	Bar Yeruham (from Hapoel Ramat HaSharon)
—	FW	ISR	Omer Buaron (from Beitar Tel Aviv Bat Yam)
—	FW	ISR	Oz Peretz (from Hapoel Ashkelon)

Out:

No.	Pos.	Nation	Player
—	GK	ISR	Dudi Alon (to Shimshon Kafr Qasim, his player card still belongs to Hapoel Tel Aviv)
—	GK	ISR	Yarden Krishtul (to Hapoel Kfar Shalem)
—	DF	ISR	Daniel Borhal (to Agudat Sport Ashdod)
—	DF	ISR	Shay Moshel (to Hapoel Ashkelon, his player card still belongs to F.C. Ashdod)
—	DF	ISR	Daniel Schwarzboim (to Hapoel Ramat HaSharon)
—	DF	ISR	David Abidor (to Hapoel Bnei Lod)
—	DF	ISR	Yarin Hassan (to Hapoel Hadera)
—	DF	ISR	Omer Mizrahi (on loan to Bnei Eilat)
—	MF	ISR	Gal Levi (to Hapoel Be'er Sheva)
—	MF	ISR	Itay Levi (on loan to Hapoel Ashkelon)
—	MF	ISR	Ofek Jerbi (on loan to Hapoel Kiryat Ono)
—	FW	ISR	Sagi Dror (to Hapoel Hadera)
—	FW	ISR	Roy Melika (to Hapoel Katamon Jerusalem)

=== Hapoel Ramat Gan ===
In:

No.	Pos.	Nation	Player
—	DF	ISR	Ofer Verta (from Hapoel Nof HaGalil)
—	DF	ISR	Mor Naaman (on loan from Hapoel Tel Aviv)
—	DF	ISR	Ovadia Darwish (loan return from Hakoah Amidar Ramat Gan)
—	DF	ISR	Dean Akafi (from Bnei Yehuda)
—	MF	ISR	Udi Cohen (from Hapoel Baqa al-Gharbiyye)
—	MF	ISR	Haim Yosef (from Maccabi Yavne)
—	MF	ISR	Ofir Takiar (from Hapoel Tel Aviv)
—	FW	NGR	Jude Nworuh (from Hapoel Marmorek)
—	FW	ISR	Lidor Buhbut (from Gadna Tel Aviv Yehuda)
—	FW	ISR	Fadi Zidan (from Hapoel Kfar Saba)
—	FW	ISR	Assi Guma (on loan from Hapoel Hadera)

Out:

No.	Pos.	Nation	Player
—	DF	ISR	Raz Nachmias (to Sektzia Nes Tziona, previously loaned from Hapoel Tel Aviv)
—	DF	ISR	Tal Adler (to Hakoah Amidar Ramat Gan)
—	DF	ISR	Avi Koren (on loan to Hapoel Herzliya)
—	DF	ISR	Tal Benesh (to Shimshon Kafr Qasim)
—	MF	ISR	Ido Sharon (to Sektzia Nes Tziona, previously loaned)
—	MF	ISR	Tal Ayela (to Maccabi Yavne)
—	MF	ISR	Daniel Gretz (to Hapoel Katamon)
—	MF	NGR	Odeni George (Free Agent)
—	MF	ISR	Ariel Hadar (Free Agent)
—	MF	ISR	Meir Mykhitar (on loan to F.C. Ironi Or Yehuda)
—	FW	ISR	Dor Hugi (to Maccabi Petah Tikva)
—	FW	ISR	Idan Golan (to Hapoel Nof HaGalil)
—	FW	ISR	Meir Cohen (on loan to Hapoel Herzliya)
—	FW	ISR	Abdallah Azam (on loan to Hapoel Iksal)
—	FW	ISR	Naor Cohen (on loan to Hapoel Umm al-Fahm)

=== Hapoel Ramat HaSharon ===
In:

No.	Pos.	Nation	Player
—	GK	ISR	Sahar Hasson (from Maccabi Tel Aviv, previously loaned)
—	DF	ISR	Yogev Lerman (from Hapoel Katamon)
—	DF	ISR	Maoz Samia (from Hapoel Bnei Lod)
—	DF	ISR	Meir Golan (from Hapoel Asi Gilboa)
—	DF	ISR	Daniel Schwarzboim (from Hapoel Ramat HaSharon)
—	DF	ISR	Erez Isakov (from Hapoel Baqa al-Gharbiyye)
—	MF	ISR	Zion Tzemah (from Hapoel Iksal)
—	MF	ISR	Tomer Sasonker (from Hapoel Kfar Saba)
—	MF	ISR	Ofek Balulu (from Hakoah Amidar Ramat Gan)
—	MF	ISR	Daniel Menashe (Free transfer)
—	FW	ISR	Ofek Marom (from Hakoah Amidar Ramat Gan)
—	FW	ISR	Rotem Hatuel (from Ironi Kiryat Shmona)
—	FW	ISR	Gal Tzroya (from F.C. Ashdod)
—	FW	ISR	Aviv Sallem (from Maccabi Herzliya)
—	FW	ISR	Roi Ronen (from Ironi Kiryat Shmona)

Out:

No.	Pos.	Nation	Player
—	DF	ISR	Yuval Sade (to Maccabi Netanya)
—	DF	ISR	Yonatan Rodionov (to Hapoel Katamon)
—	DF	ISR	Yam Sasson (to Maccabi Yavne)
—	DF	ISR	Lee Agami (to Maccabi Herzliya)
—	DF	ISR	Sagiv Solomon (to Hapoel Hadera)
—	DF	ISR	Omri Mansour (on loan to Maccabi Herzliya)
—	DF	ISR	Anwar Murad (to Hapoel Acre)
—	DF	ISR	Niv Sarel (to Maccabi Ahi Nazareth)
—	MF	ISR	Sharon Zisso (to Hapoel Katamon)
—	MF	ISR	Ohad Hazut (to Hapoel Afula)
—	MF	ISR	Moti Malka (to Bnei Sakhnin)
—	MF	ISR	Bar Yeruham (to Hapoel Petah Tikva)
—	FW	ISR	Guy Shetach (loan return to Maccabi Tel Aviv)
—	FW	ISR	Ron Ashkenazi (to Maccabi Netanya)
—	FW	ISR	Yaniv Mizrahi (to Hapoel Hadera)
—	FW	ISR	Ofek Marom (to Hapoel Kfar Shalem)
—	FW	ISR	Rotem Hatuel (to Hapoel Umm al-Fahm)

=== Hapoel Rishon LeZion ===
In:

No.	Pos.	Nation	Player
—	GK	ISR	Matan Amber (from Bnei Sakhnin)
—	DF	ISR	Matan Peleg (on loan from Beitar Jerusalem)
—	DF	ISR	Akram Shariach (from Maccabi AHi Nazareth)
—	DF	ISR	Ahmed Shaban (from Hapoel Rishon LeZion)
—	DF	ISR	Zach Baleli (on loan from Bnei Yehuda)
—	DF	ISR	Omri Luzon (from Hapoel Ashkelon)
—	MF	ISR	Michael Maman (from Hapoel Katamon)
—	MF	ISR	Anas Dabour (from Hapoel Iksal)
—	MF	ISR	Eden Dahan (on loan from Beitar Nes Tubruk)
—	MF	ISR	Avihu Azar (on loan from Maccabi Petah Tikva)
—	MF	ISR	Dor Malichi (from Hapoel Bnei Lod)
—	MF	ISR	Yaniv Brik (on loan from Maccabi Haifa)
—	MF	BRA	Claudemir (to Hapoel Tel Aviv)
—	MF	ISR	Vladimir Broun (on loan to Hapoel Rishon LeZion)
—	FW	ISR	Mohammed Kalibat (from Bnei Sakhnin)
—	FW	ISR	Gil Itzhak (on loan from Maccabi Haifa)
—	FW	ISR	Lior Berkovic (from Hapoel Haifa)

Out:

No.	Pos.	Nation	Player
—	GK	ISR	Ben Weitzman (to Hapoel Katamon)
—	GK	ISR	Roee Fucs (to Hapoel Nof HaGalil, his player card still belongs to Maccabi Haifa)
—	DF	ISR	Uri Peso (to Maccabi Yavne)
—	DF	ISR	Sagiv Cohen (to F.C. Kafr Qasim)
—	DF	ISR	Niv Serdal (to Hapoel Umm al-Fahm)
—	DF	ISR	Itzik Shoolmayster (to F.C. Kafr Qasim, his player card still belongs to Hapoel Tel Aviv)
—	DF	ISR	Ron Shlomo (to Ironi Modi'in)
—	DF	ISR	Eliran Saimon (to Hapoel Kfar Saba)
—	DF	ISR	Gal Itzhakov (to Maccabi Ironi Ashdod)
—	DF	ISR	Lior Levi (to Hapoel Azor)
—	MF	ISR	Nisan Danon (to Nordia Jerusalem)
—	MF	ISR	Avraham Asefa (on loan to Hapoel Marmorek)
—	MF	CRO	Antonio Mršić (to (Turkey) Balıkesirspor)
—	MF	ISR	Afik Otmazgin (to Shimshon Tel Aviv)
—	MF	ISR	Yaniv Bazini (on loan to F.C. Holon Yermiyahu)
—	FW	ISR	Gil Itzhak (to Maccabi Haifa)
—	FW	ISR	Sa'ar Fadida (loan return to Hapoel Haifa)
—	FW	ISR	Lior Berkovic (to Hapoel Ra'anana)
—	FW	ISR	Eden Agami (on loan to Hapoel Azor)

=== Hapoel Umm al-Fahm ===
In:

No.	Pos.	Nation	Player
—	GK	ISR	Tomer Livitanov (on loan from Maccabi Netanya)
—	DF	ISR	Sahar Dabach (from F.C. Haifa Robi Shapira)
—	DF	LTU	Tadas Kijanskas (from Hapoel Ashkelon)
—	DF	ISR	Ben Zhairi (from Hapoel Ashkelon)
—	DF	ISR	Oz Raly (from Beitar Jerusalem)
—	DF	ISR	Niv Serdal (from Hapoel Rishon LeZion)
—	DF	ISR	Peter Alwaheb (from Hapoel Marmorek)
—	MF	ISR	Abed Jabarin (on loan from Maccabi Netanya)
—	MF	ISR	Faeq Mahamid (from Hapoel Kafr Kanna)
—	MF	ISR	Safwan Zoabi (from Hapoel Kafr Kanna)
—	MF	ISR	Ben Malka (from Hapoel Iksal)
—	MF	ISR	Younes Jabarin (from Maccabi Tel Aviv)
—	MF	ISR	Ra'am Johajha (on loan from Maccabi Netanya)
—	MF	ISR	Eran Rosenbaum (from Hapoel Marmorek)
—	MF	ISR	Or Hasidim (from Hapoel Ashkelon)
—	FW	ISR	Liad Mordechai (from F.C. Haifa Robi Shapira)
—	FW	ISR	Dovev Gabay (from Hapoel Hadera)
—	FW	ISR	Raz Itzhak (from Hapoel Marmorek)
—	FW	ISR	Rotem Hatuel (from Hapoel Ramat HaSharon)
—	FW	ISR	Naor Cohen (on loan from Hapoel Ramat Gan)

Out:

No.	Pos.	Nation	Player
—	DF	ISR	Yosef Awadi (to Hapoel Petah Tikva, previously loaned to Hapoel Baqa al-Gharbiyye)
—	DF	ISR	Moshe Mishaelof (Retired)
—	DF	ISR	Halami Mahajna (on loan to Hapoel Umm al-Fahm)
—	DF	ISR	Dror Nir (to Nordia Jerusalem)
—	DF	ISR	Luhab Kayal (to Ironi Tiberias, previously loaned to Maccabi Ironi Kiryat Ata)
—	MF	ISR	Eilon Elimelech (to Hapoel Hadera)
—	MF	ISR	Ran Rol (to Nordia Jerusalem)
—	MF	ISR	Mor Shaked (to Maccabi Yavne)
—	MF	ISR	Ben Malka (to Hapoel Baqa al-Gharbiyye)
—	FW	ISR	Muamar Karakra (to Hapoel Baqa al-Gharbiyye)
—	FW	ISR	Timor Avitan (to Hapoel Iksal)
—	FW	ISR	Sari Haj Yahya (to Hapoel Bnei Zalafa)
—	FW	ISR	Mohammed Mahajna (on loan to Hapoel Asi Gilboa)
—	FW	ISR	Hen Rozen (on loan to Beitar Ramat Gan)

=== Maccabi Ahi Nazareth ===
In:

No.	Pos.	Nation	Player
—	GK	ISR	Omar Nahfaoui (loan return from Hapoel Kafr Kanna)
—	GK	ISR	Ram Strauss (Free transfer)
—	DF	ISR	Tarek Boshnak (on loan from Ironi Kiryat Shmona)
—	DF	ISR	Iham Abdah (loan return from F.C. Kafr Qasim)
—	DF	ISR	Ahmad Younes (on loan from Hapoel Bnei Ar'ara 'Ara)
—	DF	FRA	Mamadou Wagué (from (Iraq) Al-Shorta)
—	DF	ISR	Niv Sarel (from Hapoel Ramat HaSharon)
—	MF	ISR	Ahad Azam (from Maccabi Ironi Kiryat Ata)
—	MF	ISR	Yuval Shabtay (from Maccabi Petah Tikva)

Out:

No.	Pos.	Nation	Player
—	GK	ISR	Mahdi Zoabi (loan return to Ironi Kiryat Shmona)
—	GK	ISR	Ahmed Akriya (on loan to Hapoel Kafr Kanna)
—	DF	ISR	Akram Shariach (to Hapoel Rishon LeZion)
—	DF	ISR	Emri Zaid (to Hapoel Afula)
—	DF	BRA	Kassio (to (Portugal) Vilafranquense)
—	DF	ISR	Ashraf Rabah (to Hapoel Hadera)
—	MF	ISR	Yussuf Mohammed (on loan to Hapoel Bnei Ar'ara 'Ara)
—	MF	ISR	Yosef Samara (on loan to Hapoel Bnei Ar'ara 'Ara)
—	MF	BIH	Semir Bajraktarević (to (Albania) Flamurtari Vlorë)
—	MF	ISR	Salah Hussein (on loan to Hapoel Kaukab)
—	MF	ISR	Fadi Awad (on loan to Hapoel Migdal HaEmek)
—	FW	ISR	Ahmad Drawshe (to Hapoel Ra'anana)
—	FW	ISR	Kassem Sindiani (on loan to Hapoel Iksal)

=== Maccabi Petah Tikva ===
In:

No.	Pos.	Nation	Player
—	DF	ISR	Daniel Busi (loan return from Hapoel Katamon)
—	DF	ISR	Dudu Twito (from Maccabi Netanya)
—	DF	ISR	Tomer Levy (from Hapoel Ashkelon)
—	DF	ISR	Guy Kaufman (loan return from Hapoel Kfar Shalem)
—	DF	ISR	Daniel Flesher (on loan from Bnei Yehuda)
—	MF	BEL	Geoffrey Mujangi Bia (from (Belgium) Lokeren)
—	MF	AZE	Ali Babayev (from (Azerbaijan) Sumgayit)
—	MF	ISR	Yisrael Zaguri (from Bnei Sakhnin)
—	FW	ISR	Dor Hugi (from Hapoel Ramat Gan)
—	FW	ANG	Evandro Brandão (Free transfer)

Out:

No.	Pos.	Nation	Player
—	DF	SEN	Issa Cissokho (Free Agent)
—	DF	UKR	Anton Bratkov (to (Ukraine) FC Lviv)
—	DF	ISR	Shahak Levi (on loan to Maccabi Kabilio Jaffa)
—	DF	ISR	Naor Peser (to Hapoel Marmorek)
—	DF	ISR	Guy Kaufman (on loan to Hapoel Kfar Shalem)
—	DF	ISR	Oded Elkayam (to Hapoel Nof HaGalil)
—	DF	CZE	Tomáš Sivok (to (Czech Republic) Dynamo České Budějovice)
—	DF	ISR	Gal Shish (to Ironi Kiryat Shmona)
—	MF	ISR	Liran Rotman (to Beitar Jerusalem)
—	MF	CMR	Franck-Yves Bambock (to (Portugal) Marítimo)
—	MF	COD	Harrison Manzala (loan return to (France) Angers)
—	MF	ISR	Idan Vaknin (on loan to Maccabi Kabilio Jaffa)
—	MF	ISR	Yuval Shabtay (to Maccabi Ahi Nazareth)
—	MF	ISR	Gidi Kanyuk (to Hapoel Haifa, previously loaned from (Uzbekistan) Pakhtakor Tashkent FK)
—	FW	ISR	Ofir Mizrahi (to Sektzia Nes Tziona, previously loaned from Maccabi Haifa)
