= List of Israeli football transfers winter 2019–20 =

This is a list of Israeli football transfers for the 2019-20 Winter Transfer Window.

== Ligat Ha'Al ==
=== Beitar Jerusalem ===
In:

No.	Pos.	Nation	Player
—	MF	(Israel) ISR	Hanan Maman (from Hapoel Be'er Sheva)
—	FW	(Israel) ISR	Eliran Atar (from Maccabi Tel Aviv)

Out:

No.	Pos.	Nation	Player
—	FW	(Israel) ISR	Gaëtan Varenne (to Hapoel Be'er Sheva)
—	MF	(Israel) ISR	Gadi Kinda (on loan to Sporting Kansas City)

=== Bnei Yehuda ===
In:

No.	Pos.	Nation	Player
—	MF	(Israel) ISR	Shay Golan (from Ironi Kiryat Shmona)
—	MF	(Ghana) GHA	Joseph Mensah (from (Turkey) İstanbulspor)
—	FW	(South Africa) RSA	Mihlali Mayambela (on loan from (Portugal) Farense)

Out:

No.	Pos.	Nation	Player
—	GK	(Israel) ISR	Shahar Amsalem (on loan to Hapoel Rishon LeZion)
—	MF	(Israel) ISR	Liad Elad (on loan to Nordia Jerusalem)
—	MF	(Ivory Coast) CIV	Ismaila Soro (to (Scotland) Celtic)
—	MF	(Israel) ISR	Dor Kochav (to Sektzia Nes Tziona)

=== F.C. Ashdod ===
In:

No.	Pos.	Nation	Player
—	MF	(Brazil) BRA	Renan (from (Belgium) Roeselare)
—	MF	(Costa Rica) CRC	Jimmy Marín (on loan from Hapoel Be'er Sheva)

Out:

No.	Pos.	Nation	Player
—	GK	(Israel) ISR	Roy Beigel (to Sektzia Nes Tziona)
—	DF	(Israel) ISR	Eve Bukris (on loan to Hapoel Gedera)
—	DF	(Israel) ISR	Gal Aviv (on loan to Agudat Sport Ashdod)
—	DF	(Israel) ISR	Roy Sheffer (to Hapoel Ramat HaSharon)
—	MF	(Israel) ISR	Ohad Rabinovich (to Hapoel Ramat Gan)
—	MF	(Israel) ISR	Tal Swisa (on loan to Maccabi Ironi Ashdod)
—	FW	(Slovakia) SVK	Jakub Sylvestr (to Hapoel Haifa)

=== Hapoel Be'er Sheva ===
In:

No.	Pos.	Nation	Player
—	GK	(Israel) ISR	Yarden Krishtul (from Ironi Tiberias)
—	MF	(Brazil) BRA	Paulinho (from (Sweden) BK Häcken)
—	MF	(Portugal) POR	David Simão (on loan from (Greece) AEK Athens)
—	FW	(Israel) ISR	Gaëtan Varenne (from Beitar Jerusalem)
—	FW	(Israel) ISR	Qais Ganem (from Hapoel Ra'anana)
—	FW	(Netherlands) NED	Elton Acolatse (on loan from (Belgium) Sint-Truidense)

Out:

No.	Pos.	Nation	Player
—	GK	(Israel) ISR	Raz Rahamim (on loan to Hapoel Bnei Lod)
—	DF	(Israel) ISR	Adnan Abu Faul (on loan to Hapoel Bnei Lod)
—	MF	(Brazil) BRA	Paulinho (to (Sweden) Hammarby IF)
—	MF	(Israel) ISR	Ilay Trost (on loan to Hapoel Bnei Lod)
—	MF	(Israel) ISR	Eden Shamir (to (Belgium) Standard Liège)
—	MF	(Israel) ISR	Gal Levi (on loan to Hapoel Rishon LeZion)
—	MF	(Costa Rica) CRC	Jimmy Marín (on loan to F.C. Ashdod)
—	MF	(Israel) ISR	Hanan Maman (to Beitar Jerusalem)
—	FW	(Israel) ISR	Amran El Krenawy (on loan to F.C. Kafr Qasim)

=== Hapoel Hadera ===
In:

No.	Pos.	Nation	Player
—	GK	(Israel) ISR	Adi Tabachnik (from Hapoel Tel Aviv)
—	FW	(Nigeria) NGA	Junior Ogedi-Uzokwe (on loan from (England) Colchester United)

Out:

No.	Pos.	Nation	Player
—	DF	(Israel) ISR	Ashraf Rabah (to Maccabi Ahi Nazareth)
—	MF	(Israel) ISR	Sagi Dror (to Hapoel Kfar Saba)
—	MF	(Israel) ISR	Salim Amash (on loan to Hapoel Umm al-Fahm)

=== Hapoel Haifa ===
In:

No.	Pos.	Nation	Player
—	DF	(Israel) ISR	Miki Siroshtein (from (Thailand) Suphanburi)
—	DF	(Israel) ISR	Ofek Fishler (loan return from Hapoel Nof HaGalil)
—	MF	(Israel) ISR	Tomer Altman (on loan from Maccabi Tel Aviv)
—	FW	(Slovakia) SVK	Jakub Sylvestr (from F.C. Ashdod)
—	FW	(Israel) ISR	Ofir Mizrahi (from Sektzia Nes Tziona)

Out:

No.	Pos.	Nation	Player
—	MF	(Israel) ISR	Jayet Ghadir (on loan to Ahi Bir al-Maksur)
—	MF	(Israel) ISR	Naji Hamada (on loan to Ironi Nesher)
—	MF	(Israel) ISR	Gal Atias (to F.C. Haifa Robi Shapira)
—	FW	(Guyana) GUY	Emery Welshman (to Bnei Sakhnin)
—	FW	(Israel) ISR	Aner Shechter (on loan to Hapoel Ashkelon)

=== Hapoel Kfar Saba ===
In:

No.	Pos.	Nation	Player
—	MF	(Israel) ISR	Ben Reichert (from Hapoel Ramat HaSharon)
—	MF	(Israel) ISR	Sagi Dror (from Hapoel Hadera)
—	FW	(Uganda) UGA	Luwagga Kizito (from (Romania) FC Politehnica Iași)
—	FW	(Israel) ISR	Noor Bisan (from Maccabi Herzliya)

Out:

No.	Pos.	Nation	Player
—	DF	(Israel) ISR	Oz Aharon (on loan to Maccabi Kabilio Jaffa)
—	DF	(Israel) ISR	Niran Rotshtein (on loan to Hapoel Ashkelon)
—	DF	(Israel) ISR	Lev Cohen (on loan to Hapoel Nof HaGalil)
—	MF	(Israel) ISR	Gal Porat (to Nordia Jerusalem)
—	MF	(Israel) ISR	Ben Mizan (to Hapoel Katamon)
—	MF	(Israel) ISR	Kevin Rainstein (to Hapoel Afula)
—	MF	(Israel) ISR	Omer Tchalisher (to Hapoel Petah Tikva)
—	MF	(Israel) ISR	Liroy Zhairi (to Maccabi Herzliya)
—	FW	(Hungary) HUN	Richárd Vernes (to (Hungary) Vasas)
—	FW	(Israel) ISR	Dan Abutubul (on loan to F.C. Tira)
—	FW	(Nigeria) NGA	Benjamin Kuku (on loan to Hapoel Petah Tikva)
—	FW	(Palestine) PLE	Mahmoud Yousef (on loan to Hapoel Bnei Lod)

=== Hapoel Ra'anana ===
In:

No.	Pos.	Nation	Player
—	DF	(Curaçao) CUW	Darryl Lachman (from (Netherlands) PEC Zwolle)
—	MF	(Israel) ISR	Vitali Ganon (from Hapoel Petah Tikva)
—	FW	(Italy) ITA	Elia Soriano (from (Netherlands) VVV-Venlo)

Out:

No.	Pos.	Nation	Player
—	FW	(Colombia) COL	Carlos Rivas (Released)
—	FW	(Israel) ISR	Qais Ganem (to Hapoel Be'er Sheva)
—	FW	(Ivory Coast) CIV	Yaya Kone (Released)

=== Hapoel Tel Aviv ===
In:

No.	Pos.	Nation	Player
—	DF	(Israel) ISR	Afek Balas (loan return from Hapoel Marmorek)
—	MF	(Uruguay) URU	Felipe Rodríguez (from (Peru) Alianza Lima)

Out:

No.	Pos.	Nation	Player
—	GK	(Israel) ISR	Adi Tabachnik (to Hapoel Hadera)
—	MF	(Ghana) GHA	Francis Kyeremeh (Free Agent)
—	FW	(Dominican Republic) DOM	Ronaldo Vásquez (Free Agent)
—	FW	(Guinea) GUI	Demba Camara (Free Agent)
—	FW	(Israel) ISR	Ahmed Abed (to Ironi Kiryat Shmona)
—	FW	(Israel) ISR	Lior Inbrum (to Maccabi Petah Tikva, his player card still belongs to (Belgium) Gent)

=== Ironi Kiryat Shmona ===
In:

No.	Pos.	Nation	Player
—	DF	(Israel) ISR	Idan Ratta (on loan from Hapoel Ramat HaSharon)
—	DF	(Australia) AUS	Dylan de Jong (from (New Zealand) Eastern Suburbs)
—	DF	(Israel) ISR	Samuel Scheimann (from (Netherlands) VVV-Venlo)
—	FW	(Jamaica) JAM	Maalique Foster (on loan from (Costa Rica) Alajuelense)
—	FW	(Israel) ISR	Ahmed Abed (from Hapoel Tel Aviv)
—	FW	(Moldova) MDA	Radu Gînsari (on loan from (Russia) Krylia Sovetov Samara)

Out:

No.	Pos.	Nation	Player
—	DF	(Israel) ISR	Yuval Levin (on loan to Hapoel Ramat HaSharon)
—	MF	(Costa Rica) CRC	John Jairo Ruiz (to (Costa Rica) Herediano)
—	MF	(Israel) ISR	Shay Golan (to Bnei Yehuda)
—	MF	(Israel) ISR	Shahar Lazaruf (to Maccabi Tzur Shalom)
—	MF	(Israel) ISR	Tal Vigdorovic (on loan to Hapoel Bnei Tuba-Zangariyye)
—	MF	(Israel) ISR	Yadin Lugasi (on loan to Ironi Kiryat Shmona)
—	FW	(Republic of Ireland) IRL	Cillian Sheridan (to (Poland) Wisła Płock)

=== Maccabi Haifa ===
In:

No.	Pos.	Nation	Player
—	GK	(United States) USA	Joe Kuzminsky (on loan from (United States) Charleston Battery)
—	DF	(Spain) ESP	Lillo (from (Spain) Osasuna)
—	DF	(Israel) ISR	Yonatan Levi (loan return from Sektzia Nes Tziona)

Out:

No.	Pos.	Nation	Player
—	DF	(Israel) ISR	Shay Ben David (on loan to (Italy) Trapani Calcio)
—	DF	(Israel) ISR	Haithem Falah (on loan to Hapoel Acre)
—	MF	(Cameroon) CMR	Jeando Fuchs (loan return to (Spain) Alavés)

=== Maccabi Netanya ===
In:

No.	Pos.	Nation	Player
—	GK	(Israel) ISR	Roy Beigel (from F.C. Ashdod)
—	DF	(Serbia) SRB	Zlatan Šehović (on loan from (Serbia) Partizan)
—	DF	(Serbia) SRB	Lazar Ćirković (from (Switzerland) FC Luzern)
—	MF	(Israel) ISR	Hen Ezra (from (Cyprus) AC Omonia)

Out:

No.	Pos.	Nation	Player
—	GK	(Israel) ISR	Golan Elkaslasy (on loan to Hapoel Afula)
—	DF	(Israel) ISR	Yuval Sade (on loan to Haopel Ramat HaSharon)
—	DF	(Israel) ISR	Ben Turjeman (to Bnei Sakhnin)
—	DF	(Spain) ESP	Román Golobart (to (Cyprus) AEK Larnaca)
—	DF	(Israel) ISR	Shalev Semorlo (on loan to F.C. Ironi Or Yehuda)
—	MF	(Albania) ALB	Jahmir Hyka (to Sektzia Nes Tziona)
—	FW	(Israel) ISR	Sahar Barami (on loan to Maccabi Kabilio Jaffa)
—	FW	(Israel) ISR	Iyad Haj (on loan to Maccabi Ahi Nazareth)

=== Maccabi Tel Aviv ===
In:

No.	Pos.	Nation	Player

Out:

No.	Pos.	Nation	Player
—	DF	(Israel) ISR	Fadi Najar (on loan to Beitar Tel Aviv Bat Yam)
—	MF	(Israel) ISR	Yoav Hofmayster (to Hapoel Ramat HaSharon, previously loaned to Beitar Tel Aviv Bat Yam)
—	MF	(Israel) ISR	Neil Goldberg (on loan to Beitar Tel Aviv Bat Yam)
—	FW	(Israel) ISR	Eliran Atar (to Beitar Jerusalem)
—	FW	(Israel) ISR	Aaron Schoenfeld (to (United States) Minnesota United)
—	FW	(Ghana) GHA	Pirnce Okraku (to (Ghana) Dreams, previously loaned to Beitar Tel Aviv Bat Yam)

=== Sektzia Nes Tziona ===
In:

No.	Pos.	Nation	Player
—	DF	(Israel) ISR	Benel Edri (on loan from F.C. Ashdod)
—	MF	(Israel) ISR	Dor Kochav (from Bnei Yehuda)
—	MF	(Albania) ALB	Jahmir Hyka (from Maccabi Netanya)
—	FW	(Israel) ISR	Eial Strahman (from (Argentina) Almagro)

Out:

No.	Pos.	Nation	Player
—	DF	(Israel) ISR	Osher Abu (to Maccabi Petah Tikva)
—	DF	(Israel) ISR	Yonatan Levi (loan return to Maccabi Haifa)
—	MF	(Israel) ISR	David Boysen (to Hapoel Nof HaGalil)
—	MF	(Israel) ISR	Eylon Yerushalmi (to Hapoel Umm al-Fahm, his player card still belongs to Maccabi Netanya)
—	FW	(Israel) ISR	Eden Shrem (to F.C. Kafr Qasim)
—	FW	(Israel) ISR	Nir Sharon (to Hapoel Marmorek)
—	FW	(Israel) ISR	Ofir Mizrahi (to Hapoel Haifa)

== Liga Leumit ==
=== Beitar Tel Aviv Bat Yam ===
In:

No.	Pos.	Nation	Player
—	DF	(Israel) ISR	Fadi Najar (on loan from Maccabi Tel Aviv)
—	MF	(Israel) ISR	Nadav Mashiah (from Hapoel Ramat Gan)
—	MF	(Israel) ISR	Neil Goldberg (on loan from Maccabi Tel Aviv)

Out:

No.	Pos.	Nation	Player
—	MF	(Israel) ISR	Yoav Hofmayster (to Hapoel Ramat HaSharon, previously loaned from Maccabi Tel Aviv)
—	MF	(Israel) ISR	Tomer Altman (to Hapoel Haifa, his player card still belongs to Maccabi Tel Aviv)
—	MF	(Israel) ISR	Dor Nahmani (to Hapoel Herzliya)
—	MF	(Israel) ISR	Salam Abd al-Salama (on loan to Hapoel Ashkelon)
—	FW	(Ghana) GHA	Prince Okraku (to (Ghana) Dreams, previously loaned from Maccabi Tel Aviv)
—	FW	(Israel) ISR	Rafael Tafara (on loan to Hapoel Baqa al-Gharbiyye)
—	FW	(Israel) ISR	Dor Moskovich (to Hapoel Ashkelon)

=== Bnei Sakhnin ===
In:

No.	Pos.	Nation	Player
—	DF	(Israel) ISR	Ben Turjeman (from Maccabi Netanya)
—	MF	(Israel) ISR	Dean Twizer (from Ironi Tiberias)
—	FW	(Guyana) GUY	Emery Welshman (from Hapoel Haifa)
—	FW	(Israel) ISR	Liron Elimelech (on loan from Ironi Tiberias)

Out:

No.	Pos.	Nation	Player
—	DF	(Gabon) GAB	Gilchrist Nguema (on loan to Maccabi Ahi Nazareth)
—	DF	(Israel) ISR	Ayman Hamza (on loan to Hapoel Bnei Zalafa)
—	DF	(Israel) ISR	Salah Najar (on loan to Hapoel Bnei Zalafa)
—	MF	(Israel) ISR	Souhel Armeli (to Hapoel Katamon)

=== F.C. Kafr Qasim ===
In:

No.	Pos.	Nation	Player
—	MF	(Israel) ISR	Phillip Manneh (Free transfer)
—	FW	(Israel) ISR	Amran El Krenawy (on loan from Hapoel Be'er Sheva)
—	FW	(Israel) ISR	Eden Shrem (from F.C. Kafr Qasim)
—	FW	(Portugal) POR	Rafael Victor (from (Iceland) Þróttur)

Out:

No.	Pos.	Nation	Player
—	DF	(Israel) ISR	Elmajdad Badaoui (on loan to Hapoel Kafr Qasim)
—	DF	(Israel) ISR	Kamel Abu Bilal (on loan to Hapoel Kafr Qasim)
—	MF	(Israel) ISR	Phillip Manneh (to Hapoel Umm al-Fahm)
—	MF	(Israel) ISR	Mohammed Abu Ras (to Shimshon Kafr Qasim)
—	MF	(Israel) ISR	Idan David (to Hapoel Kfar Shalem)
—	FW	(Israel) ISR	Mahmmoud Tahal (on loan to Hapoel Kafr Qasim)
—	FW	(Israel) ISR	Mohammed Badir (to Shimshon Kafr Qasim)

=== Hapoel Acre ===
In:

No.	Pos.	Nation	Player
—	DF	(Israel) ISR	Haithem Falah (on loan from Maccabi Haifa)
—	MF	(Israel) ISR	Eran Biton (Free transfer)
—	MF	(Japan) JPN	Takuya Murayama (Free transfer)
—	MF	(Israel) ISR	Yadin Lugasi (on loan from Ironi Kiryat Shmona)
—	FW	(Israel) ISR	Gal Katabi (on loan from Maccabi Haifa)

Out:

No.	Pos.	Nation	Player
—	MF	(Israel) ISR	Lidor Amiri (on loan to Beiyar Nahariya)
—	MF	(Israel) ISR	Diego Nicolaievsky (to Hapoel Marmorek)
—	MF	(Israel) ISR	Avihay Alfasi (on loan to F.C. Daburiyya)
—	FW	(Israel) ISR	Yaniv Mizrahi (on loan to Hakoah Amidar Ramat Gan)
—	FW	(Israel) ISR	Ezat Khalaila (to Hapoel Umm al-Fahm)

=== Hapoel Afula ===
In:

No.	Pos.	Nation	Player
—	GK	(Israel) ISR	Golan Elkaslasy (on loan from Maccabi Netanya)
—	DF	(Israel) ISR	Hen Dilmoni (Free transfer)
—	DF	(Israel) ISR	Erez Isakov (from Hapoel Ramat HaSharon)
—	MF	(Israel) ISR	Liel Cohen (from Hapoel Marmorek)
—	MF	(Israel) ISR	Kevin Rainstein (from Hapoel Kfar Saba)
—	MF	(Israel) ISR	Yuval Titelman (Free transfer)
—	MF	(Israel) ISR	Eran Levi (from Hapoel Umm al-Fahm)
—	FW	(Israel) ISR	Dudu Biton (Free transfer)
—	FW	(Montenegro) MNE	Žarko Korać (from (Malaysia) UiTM)

Out:

No.	Pos.	Nation	Player
—	DF	(Israel) ISR	Yuval Yosipovich (to Hapoel Iksal)
—	DF	(Israel) ISR	Asaf Ben Shabat (to Hapoel Azor, his player card still belongs to Maccabi Netanya)
—	DF	(Israel) ISR	Hen Dilmoni (to Maccabi Herzliya)
—	MF	(Israel) ISR	Nahrat Khaykho (on loan to F.C. Kafr Kama)
—	MF	(Israel) ISR	Afik Cohen (to Hakoah Amidar Ramat Gan)
—	FW	(Israel) ISR	Hen Elbaz (to Hapoel Beit She'an)
—	FW	(Israel) ISR	Gal Katabi (to Hapoel Acre, his player card still belongs to Maccabi Haifa)
—	FW	(Israel) ISR	Almog Shankur (to Hapoel Iksal)

=== Hapoel Ashkelon ===
In:

No.	Pos.	Nation	Player
—	DF	(Israel) ISR	Niran Rotshtein (on loan from Hapoel Kfar Saba)
—	DF	(Israel) ISR	Ben Grabli (from Hapoel Bnei Lod)
—	MF	(Israel) ISR	Itay Tako (on loan from Maccabi Petah Tikva)
—	MF	(Israel) ISR	Salam Abd al-Salama (on loan from Beitar Tel Aviv Bat Yam)
—	FW	(Israel) ISR	Aner Shechter (on loan from Hapoel Haifa)
—	FW	(Israel) ISR	Dor Moskovich (from Beitar Tel Aviv Bat Yam)
—	FW	(Israel) ISR	Raphael de la Sousa (from (Georgia (country)) FC Rustavi)

Out:

No.	Pos.	Nation	Player
—	GK	(Israel) ISR	Aviram Ziat (to Hapoel Baqa al-Gharbiyye)
—	DF	(Israel) ISR	Benel Edri (to Sektzia Nes Tziona, his player card still belongs to F.C. Ashdod)
—	DF	(Israel) ISR	Shay Moshel (to Hapoel Katamon, his player card still belongs to F.C. Ashdod)
—	MF	(Israel) ISR	Zion Tzemah (to Hapoel Bnei Lod)
—	MF	(Israel) ISR	Itay Levi (to Shimshon Kafr Qasim, his player card still belongs to Hapoel Petah Tikva)
—	MF	(Israel) ISR	Yoni Yaccov (on loan to Maccabi Kiryat Malakhi)
—	MF	(Israel) ISR	Adar Awat (to Agudat Sport Ashdod, his player card still belongs to F.C. Ashdod)
—	FW	(Israel) ISR	Dolev Abergel (on loan to Maccabi Ironi Netivot)
—	FW	(Israel) ISR	Netanel Moris (to Maccabi Ironi Ashdod, his player card still belongs to Beitar Tubruk)
—	FW	(Israel) ISR	Mamoon Qashoua (to (Austria) FC Mauerwerk)

=== Hapoel Bnei Lod ===
In:

No.	Pos.	Nation	Player
—	GK	(Israel) ISR	Raz Rahamim (on loan from Hapoel Be'er Sheva)
—	DF	(Israel) ISR	Ben Grabli (from Hapoel Iksal)
—	DF	(Serbia) SRB	Dušan Matović (from (Serbia) Voždovac)
—	DF	(Israel) ISR	Ben Bachar (from Hapoel Rishon LeZion)
—	DF	(Israel) ISR	Adnan Abu Faul (on loan from Hapoel Be'er Sheva)
—	MF	(Israel) ISR	Ilay Trost (on loan from Hapoel Be'er Sheva)
—	MF	(Israel) ISR	Yuval Haliva (from Hapoel Rishon LeZion)
—	MF	(Israel) ISR	Zion Tzemah (from Hapoel Ashkelon)
—	FW	(Israel) ISR	Noam Mizrahi (from F.C. Jerusalem)
—	FW	(Israel) ISR	Gal Tzroya (from Hapoel Ramat HaSharon)
—	FW	(Palestine) PLE	Mahmoud Yousef (on loan from Hapoel Kfar Saba)

Out:

No.	Pos.	Nation	Player
—	GK	(Israel) ISR	Yonathan Rotschild (to Maccabi Ironi Ashdod)
—	DF	(Israel) ISR	Nir Gvili (to Hapoel Kfar Shalem, his player card still belongs to Bnei Yehuda)
—	DF	(Israel) ISR	Gal Sapir (to Hapoel Azor)
—	DF	(Israel) ISR	Ben Grabli (to Hapoel Ashkelon)
—	DF	(Israel) ISR	David Abidor (to (United States) Oakland Roots)
—	MF	(Israel) ISR	Hisham Kiwan (to Ihud Bnei Majd al-Krum)
—	MF	(Israel) ISR	Hasan Abu Zaid (to (Palestine) Shabab Al-Khalil)
—	MF	(Israel) ISR	Mohammed Azbarga (to (Palestine) Shabab Al-Khalil)
—	MF	(Israel) ISR	Elad Boaron (to Maccabi Herzliya)
—	MF	(Israel) ISR	Yossi Sallallich (to F.C. Holon Yermiyahu)
—	MF	(Israel) ISR	Nirel Mahpud (to Nordia Jerusalem)
—	FW	(Israel) ISR	Salah Hamdiya (to Ironi Kuseife)
—	FW	(Israel) ISR	Musa Tarabin (loan return to Hapoel Iksal)
—	FW	(Israel) ISR	Ohad Barzilay (to Hapoel Marmorek)
—	FW	(Israel) ISR	Wael Mresat (to Hapoel Kaukab)
—	FW	(Israel) ISR	Amir Khalaila (to Hapoel Kaukab)

=== Hapoel Katamon ===
In:

No.	Pos.	Nation	Player
—	DF	(Israel) ISR	Shay Moshel (on loan from F.C. Ashdod)
—	MF	(Israel) ISR	Ben Mizan (from Hapoel Kfar Saba)
—	MF	(Israel) ISR	Souhel Armeli (from Bnei Sakhnin)

Out:

No.	Pos.	Nation	Player

=== Hapoel Nof HaGalil ===
In:

No.	Pos.	Nation	Player
—	DF	(Israel) ISR	Lev Cohen (on loan from Hapoel Kfar Saba)
—	MF	(Israel) ISR	David Boysen (from Sektzia Nes Tziona)

Out:

No.	Pos.	Nation	Player
—	DF	(Israel) ISR	Ofek Fishler (loan return to Hapoel Haifa)

=== Hapoel Petah Tikva ===
In:

No.	Pos.	Nation	Player
—	DF	(Israel) ISR	Daniel Schwarzboim (from Hapoel Ramat HaSharon)
—	DF	(Israel) ISR	Niv Serdal (from Hapoel Umm al-Fahm)
—	MF	(Israel) ISR	Omer Tchalisher (from Hapoel Kfar Saba)
—	MF	(Israel) ISR	Almog Ohayon (from Hapoel Kfar Shalem)
—	FW	(Nigeria) NGA	Benjamin Kuku (on loan from Hapoel Kfar Saba)

Out:

No.	Pos.	Nation	Player
—	DF	(Israel) ISR	Yosef Awadi (on loan to Agudat Sport Ashdod)
—	MF	(Israel) ISR	Vitali Ganon (to Hapoel Ra'anana)
—	MF	(Israel) ISR	Yakir Natan (on loan to Hapoel Bik'at HaYarden)

=== Hapoel Ramat Gan ===
In:

No.	Pos.	Nation	Player
—	MF	(Israel) ISR	Ohad Rabinovich (from F.C. Ashdod)
—	MF	(Israel) ISR	Tal Daon (from Maccabi Petah Tikva)
—	FW	(Brazil) BRA	Caludir (from (Indonesia) PSIS Semarang)

Out:

No.	Pos.	Nation	Player
—	DF	(Israel) ISR	Dean Maimoni (to Hapoel Umm al-Fahm)
—	DF	(Israel) ISR	Omer Henig (on loan to F.C. Holon Yermiyahu)
—	MF	(Israel) ISR	Rotem Ziv (on loan to Ironi Beit Dagan)
—	MF	(Israel) ISR	Itzhak Almyo (on loan to Beitar Yavne)
—	MF	(Israel) ISR	Nadav Mashiah (to Beitar Tel Aviv Bat Yam, previously loaned to Hapoel Kfar Shalem)
—	MF	(Israel) ISR	Ofir Takiar (on loan to Hapoel Kfar Shalem)
—	FW	(Israel) ISR	Lidor Buhbut (on loan to Maccabi Yavne)
—	FW	(Nigeria) NGA	Jude Nworuh (Released)

=== Hapoel Ramat HaSharon ===
In:

No.	Pos.	Nation	Player
—	DF	(Israel) ISR	Yuval Sade (on loan from Maccabi Netanya)
—	DF	(Israel) ISR	Yuval Levin (on loan from Ironi Kiryat Shmona)
—	DF	(Israel) ISR	Roy Sheffer (from F.C. Ashdod)
—	MF	(Israel) ISR	Meir Golan (Free transfer)
—	MF	(Israel) ISR	Yoav Hofmayster (from Maccabi Tel Aviv)
—	MF	(Israel) ISR	Guy Shetah (from Hapoel Kfar Shalem)
—	MF	(Senegal) SEN	Romuald da Costa (on loan from (The Gambia) Superstars Academy)
—	MF	(Israel) ISR	Yaniv Brik (on loan from Maccabi Haifa)
—	FW	(Israel) ISR	Elior Mishali (on loan from F.C. Ashdod)

Out:

No.	Pos.	Nation	Player
—	DF	(Israel) ISR	Idan Ratta (on loan to Ironi Kiryat Shmona)
—	DF	(Israel) ISR	Daniel Schwarzboim (to Hapoel Petah Tikva)
—	DF	(Israel) ISR	Erez Isakov (to Hapoel Afula)
—	MF	(Israel) ISR	Ben Reichert (to Hapoel Kfar Saba)
—	FW	(Israel) ISR	Gal Tzroya (to Hapoel Bnei Lod)
—	FW	(The Gambia) GAM	Pa Omar Babou (to (Belgium) Lommel)
—	FW	(Israel) ISR	Aviv Sellam (to Maccabi Herzliya)

=== Hapoel Rishon LeZion ===
In:

No.	Pos.	Nation	Player
—	DF	(Israel) ISR	Daniil Sheviakov (from (Estonia) Kalev)
—	DF	(Israel) ISR	Maor Gerassi (Free transfer)
—	DF	(Israel) ISR	Nadav Muniss (on loan from Hapoel Umm al-Fahm)
—	MF	(Israel) ISR	Gal Levi (on loan from Hapoel Be'er Sheva)
—	MF	(Israel) ISR	Reef Mesika (from Hapoel Umm al-Fahm)
—	MF	(Israel) ISR	Abu Shaker (from Hapoel Hadera)

Out:

No.	Pos.	Nation	Player
—	DF	(Israel) ISR	Bar Belki (to F.C. Ironi Or Yehuda)
—	DF	(Israel) ISR	Dean Maimoni (to Hapoel Umm al-Fahm)
—	DF	(Israel) ISR	Ilay Bachar (to Maccabi Herzliya)
—	DF	(Israel) ISR	Ben Bachar (to Hapoel Bnei Lod)
—	MF	(Israel) ISR	Ofek Cohen (on loan to Ironi Modi'in)
—	MF	(Israel) ISR	George Amsis (to Shimshon Kafr Qasim)
—	MF	(Israel) ISR	Yuval Haliva (to Hapoel Bnei Lod)
—	MF	(Israel) ISR	Yaniv Brik (to Hapoel Ramat HaSharon, his player card sill belongs to Maccabi Haifa)
—	FW	(Israel) ISR	Mohammed Kalibat (to Hapoel Umm al-Fahm)

=== Hapoel Umm al-Fahm ===
In:

No.	Pos.	Nation	Player
—	GK	(Israel) ISR	Eliran Gabai (from Ironi Tiberias)
—	DF	(Israel) ISR	Jeffery Nissenbaum (from Maccabi Tzur Shalom)
—	MF	(Israel) ISR	Eran Levi (Free transfer)
—	MF	(Israel) ISR	Phillip Manneh (from F.C. Kafr Qasim)
—	MF	(Israel) ISR	Salim Amash (on loan from Hapoel Hadera)
—	MF	(Israel) ISR	Eylon Yerushalmi (on loan from Maccabi Netanya)
—	FW	(Israel) ISR	Mohammed Kalibat (from Hapoel Umm al-Fahm)
—	FW	(Israel) ISR	Ezat Khalaila (from Hapoel Acre)

Out:

No.	Pos.	Nation	Player
—	DF	(Israel) ISR	Nadav Muniss (on loan to Hapoel Rishon LeZion)
—	DF	(Israel) ISR	Niv Serdal (to Hapoel Petah Tikva)
—	MF	(Israel) ISR	Peter Alwaheb (to Hapoel Baqa al-Gharbiyye)
—	MF	(Israel) ISR	Aviran Turgeman (to Hapoel Kfar Shalem)
—	MF	(Israel) ISR	Eran Levi (to Hapoel Afula)
—	MF	(Israel) ISR	Reef Mesika (to Hapoel Rishon LeZion)
—	MF	(Israel) ISR	Abu Shaker (to Hapoel Rishon LeZion)
—	MF	(Israel) ISR	Rotem Hatuel (to Maccabi Ahi Nazareth)
—	FW	(Israel) ISR	Elior Mishali (to Hapoel Ramat HaSharon, his player card still belongs to F.C. Ashdod)

=== Maccabi Ahi Nazareth ===
In:

No.	Pos.	Nation	Player
—	DF	(Israel) ISR	Ashraf Rabah (from Hapoel Hadera)
—	DF	(Israel) ISR	Gilchrist Nguema (on loan from Bnei Sakhnin)
—	MF	(Israel) ISR	Rotem Hatuel (from Hapoel Ramat HaSharon)
—	FW	(Israel) ISR	Iyad Haj (on loan from Maccabi Netanya)

Out:

No.	Pos.	Nation	Player
—	MF	(Israel) ISR	Moamen Salah (on loan to Hapoel Bnei Ar'ara 'Ara)
—	MF	(Israel) ISR	Amir Abu Salem (on loan to Hapoel Kafr Kanna)

=== Maccabi Petah Tikva ===
In:

No.	Pos.	Nation	Player
—	DF	(Israel) ISR	Osher Abu (from Sektzia Nes Tziona)
—	FW	(Israel) ISR	Lior Inbrum (on loan from (Belgium) Gent)

Out:

No.	Pos.	Nation	Player
—	DF	(Israel) ISR	Teva Barret (on loan to Shimshon Kafr Qasim)
—	MF	(Israel) ISR	Yali Shiray (on loan to Shimshon Kafr Qasim)
—	MF	(Israel) ISR	Tal Daon (to Hapoel Ramat Gan)
—	MF	(Israel) ISR	Itay Tako (on loan to Hapoel Ashkelon)
