= 2015–16 Toto Cup Al =

Tournament details
- Country: Israel
- Teams: 14

Final positions
- Champions: Maccabi Petah Tikva
- Runners-up: Ironi Kiryat Shmona

Tournament statistics
- Matches played: 37
- Goals scored: 83 (2.24 per match)
- Top goal scorer(s): (Romania) Ovidiu Hoban (Israel) Alon Turgeman (3)

The 2015–16 Toto Cup Al was the 31st season of the third-important football tournament in Israel since its introduction and the 11th tournament involving Israeli Premier League clubs only.

The competition was held in two stages. First, fourteen Premier League teams were divided into three groups, five teams in groups A and B and four teams in group C, the teams playing against each other once. The best three teams from groups A and B and the best two teams from group C advanced to the quarter-finals, which will was played over two-legged ties. The semi-finals and the final were then played as one-legged matches in a neutral venue.

The tournament started on 1 August 2015. Maccabi Tel Aviv were the defending champions, after winning the previous competition.

Maccabi Petah Tikva won the title, beating Ironi Kiryat Shmona 3–1 in the final.

== Group stage ==
Groups were allocated according to geographic distribution of the clubs, with the northern clubs allocated to Group A, Gush Dan clubs (from Tel Aviv and Petah Tikva, allocated to Group C), and the rest to Group B. The groups were announced by the IFA on 25 June 2015.

The matches were played between 1 August 2015 and end on 17 August, with leftover matches played on 9 September, if necessary.

=== Group A ===
Pos	Team	Pld	W	D	L	GF	GA	GD	Pts	MHA	IKS	HHA	BnS	HAC
1	Maccabi Haifa (A)	4	4	0	0	8	2	+6	12			2–1		3–0
2	Ironi Kiryat Shmona (A)	4	3	0	1	6	3	+3	9	1–2		1–0		
3	Hapoel Haifa (A)	4	2	0	2	6	3	+3	6				2–0	3–0
4	Bnei Sakhnin	4	0	1	3	3	8	−5	1	0–1	1–3			
5	Hapoel Acre	4	0	1	3	2	9	−7	1		0–1		2–2	

Updated to match(es) played on 28 October 2015. Source: football.org.il (in Hebrew)
Legend: Blue = home team win; Yellow = draw; Red = away team win.
Rules for classification: 1st points; 2nd goal difference; 3rd matches won; 4th goals scored; 5th head-to-head; 6th decision match
(A) Advanced to the quarter finals

=== Group B ===
Pos	Team	Pld	W	D	L	GF	GA	GD	Pts	MNE	HBS	BEI	HRA	HKS
1	Maccabi Netanya (A)	4	2	2	0	4	0	+4	8		2–0	2–0		
2	Hapoel Be'er Sheva (A)	4	2	1	1	7	3	+4	7			4–0		2–0
3	Beitar Jerusalem (A)	4	2	0	2	2	6	−4	6				1–0	1–0
4	Hapoel Ra'anana	4	1	2	1	2	2	0	5	0–0	1–1			
5	Hapoel Kfar Saba	4	0	1	3	0	4	−4	1	0–0			0–1	

Updated to match(es) played on 17 August 2015. Source: football.org.il (in Hebrew)
Legend: Blue = home team win; Yellow = draw; Red = away team win.
Rules for classification: 1st points; 2nd goal difference; 3rd matches won; 4th goals scored; 5th head-to-head; 6th decision match
(A) Advanced to the quarter finals

=== Group C ===
Pos	Team	Pld	W	D	L	GF	GA	GD	Pts	MPT	BnY	MTA	HTA
1	Maccabi Petah Tikva (A)	3	3	0	0	9	2	+7	9		3–0		
2	Bnei Yehuda (A)	3	2	0	1	5	4	+1	6			3–1	2–0
3	Maccabi Tel Aviv	3	1	0	2	4	7	−3	3	0–3			
4	Hapoel Tel Aviv	3	0	0	3	3	8	−5	0	2–3		1–3	

Updated to match(es) played on 28 October 2015. Source: football.org.il (in Hebrew)
Legend: Blue = home team win; Yellow = draw; Red = away team win.
Rules for classification: 1st points; 2nd goal difference; 3rd matches won; 4th goals scored; 5th head-to-head; 6th decision match
(A) Advanced to the quarter finals

== Knockout rounds ==
The quarter finals draw was held on 29 October.

All times are in Israel Standard Time

=== Quarter-finals ===
Team 1	Agg.	Team 2	1st leg	2nd leg
Maccabi Haifa	1–2	Maccabi Petah Tikva	0–1	1–1
Beitar Jerusalem	2–2 (4–2 p)	Hapoel Be'er Sheva	1–1	1–1
Hapoel Haifa	1–2	Ironi Kiryat Shmona	0–1	1–1
Bnei Yehuda	2–1	Maccabi Netanya	1–1	1–0

==== First leg ====
1 December 2015	Maccabi Haifa	0–1	Maccabi Petah Tikva	Netanya
20:30	Shechter (red card) 82'	Summary; Report (Hebrew)	Hugi 6'	Stadium: Netanya Stadium; Attendance: 500; Referee: Ziv Adler

2 December 2015	Bnei Yehuda	1–1	Maccabi Netanya	Tel Aviv
19:00	Kadusi 86'	Summary; Report (Hebrew)	Jabarin 54'	Stadium: Bloomfield Stadium; Attendance: 500; Referee: Gal Leibowitz

2 December 2015	Hapoel Haifa	0–1	Ironi Kiryat Shmona	Acre
19:05		Summary; Report (Hebrew)	Abed 11'	Stadium: Acre Municipal Stadium; Attendance: 500; Referee: Menashe Mashiah

2 December 2015	Beitar Jerusalem	1–1	Hapoel Be'er Sheva	Jerusalem
21:00	L. Cohen 46'	Summary; Report (Hebrew)	Arbeitman 64'	Stadium: Teddy Stadium; Attendance: 2,000; Referee: Oren Siminyan

==== Second leg ====
15 December 2015	Maccabi Netanya	0–1	Bnei Yehuda	Netanya
20:00		Summary; Report (Hebrew)	Nworuh 67'	Stadium: Netanya Stadium; Attendance: 1,300; Referee: Orel Greenfeld

Bnei Yehuda won 2–1 on aggregate.

15 December 2015	Maccabi Petah Tikva	1–1	Maccabi Haifa	Ashdod
20:30	Gavish 65'	Summary; Report (Hebrew)	Gozlan 16'	Stadium: Yud-Alef Stadium; Referee: Liran Liany

Maccabi Petah Tikva won 2–1 on aggregate.

16 December 2015	Ironi Kiryat Shmona	1–1	Hapoel Haifa	Acre
20:00	Serdal 80' (o.g.)	Summary; Report (Hebrew)	Elbaz 80'	Stadium: Acre Municipal Stadium; Attendance: 250; Referee: Guy Berger

Ironi Kiryat Shmona won 2–1 on aggregate.

16 December 2015	Hapoel Be'er Sheva	1–1 (a.e.t.) (2 – 4 p)	Beitar Jerusalem	Be'er Sheva
20:30	Tzedek 90+5'	Summary; Report (Hebrew)	Gabay 54'	Stadium: Turner Stadium; Attendance: 9,400; Referee: Daniel Bar-Natan
	Penalties
	Tzedek (penalty scored); Ogu (penalty scored); Arbeitman (penalty missed); Melikson (penalty missed)		(penalty scored) Atzili; (penalty scored) I. Cohen; (penalty scored) Claudemir; (penalty scored) Rueda

2–2 on aggregate. Beitar Jerusalem won 4–2 on penalties.

=== Semifinals ===
30 December 2015	Bnei Yehuda	0–3	Ironi Kiryat Shmona	Petah Tikva
19:00		Summary; Report (Hebrew)	Amutu 38', 44'; Mizrachi 79'	Stadium: HaMoshava Stadium; Attendance: 200; Referee: Eli Hachmon

30 December 2015	Maccabi Petah Tikva	2–0	Beitar Jerusalem	Netanya
21:00	Kanyuk 32'; Jakobovich 59'	Summary; Report (Hebrew)		Stadium: Netanya Stadium; Attendance: 2,500; Referee: Eitan Shmuelevich

=== Final ===
2 February 2016	Ironi Kiryat Shmona	1–3	Maccabi Petah Tikva	Netanya
19:30	Bruno 7'	Summary; Report (Hebrew)	Goldenberg 20'; Kalibat 59'; Rotman 89'	Stadium: Netanya Stadium; Attendance: 2,500; Referee: Alon Yefet

== See also ==
- 2015–16 Toto Cup Leumit
- 2015–16 Israeli Premier League
- 2015–16 Israel State Cup
