= Assi Guma =

Israeli footballer

Personal information
- Full name: Assi Guma
- Date of birth: October 7, 1989 (age 37)
- Place of birth: Hadera, Israel
- Position: Forward

Youth career
- Hapoel Hadera

Senior career*
Years	Team	Apps	(Gls)
2006–2021	Hapoel Hadera	169	(64)
2010–2014	→ F.C. Givat Olga (loan)	98	(25)
2014	→ Hapoel Asi Gilboa (loan)	5	(4)
2014–2015	→ F.C. Givat Olga (loan)	16	(6)
2019	→ Hapoel Ashkelon (loan)	15	(3)
2019–2020	→ Hapoel Ramat Gan (loan)	23	(5)
2021–2022	Ironi Tiberias	22	(9)
2022	Tzeirei Tayibe	10	(4)
2022–2023	Hapoel Herzliya	6	(4)
- * Club domestic league appearances and goals as of 1 June 2023 (UTC)

Assi Guma (Hebrew: אסי גומה) is an Israeli footballer who plays for Tzeirei Tayibe at Liga Alef.
