= Elad Shahaf =

Burkinabé footballer

Personal information
- Date of birth: 13 January 1998 (age 28)
- Place of birth: Herzliya, Israel
- Height: 1.69 m (5 ft 7 in)
- Position: Midfielder

Team information
- Current team: Bnei Yehuda
- Number: 36

Youth career
- 2006–2014: Maccabi Tel Aviv
- 2014–2015: Maccabi Petah Tikva
- 2015–2017: Maccabi Netanya

Senior career*
| Years | Team | Apps | (Gls) |
| 2017–2021 | Maccabi Netanya | 22 | (1) |
| 2019–2020 | → Sektzia Ness Ziona | 29 | (2) |
| 2021–2022 | Hapoel Nof HaGalil | 19 | (1) |
| 2022 | Kafr Qasim | 13 | (1) |
| 2022–2023 | Botoșani | 12 | (0) |
| 2023–2025 | F.C. Ashdod | 57 | (4) |
| 2025 | Bnei Sakhnin | 10 | (0) |
| 2025– | Bnei Yehuda | 27 | (0) |
- * Club domestic league appearances and goals as of 24 June 2026

Elad Shahaf (Hebrew: אלעד שחף; born 13 January 1998) is an Israeli professional footballer who plays as a midfielder for Bnei Yehuda. Shahaf started his career in Israel at Bnei Sakhnin, then playing for teams such as Sektzia Ness Ziona, Hapoel Nof HaGalil or Kafr Qasim, before moving to Romania and signing with top-flight club FC Botoșani.

== Honours ==
Maccabi Netanya

- Liga Leumit: 2016–17
- Toto Cup runner-up: 2018–19
