= Ben Grabli =

Israeli footballer

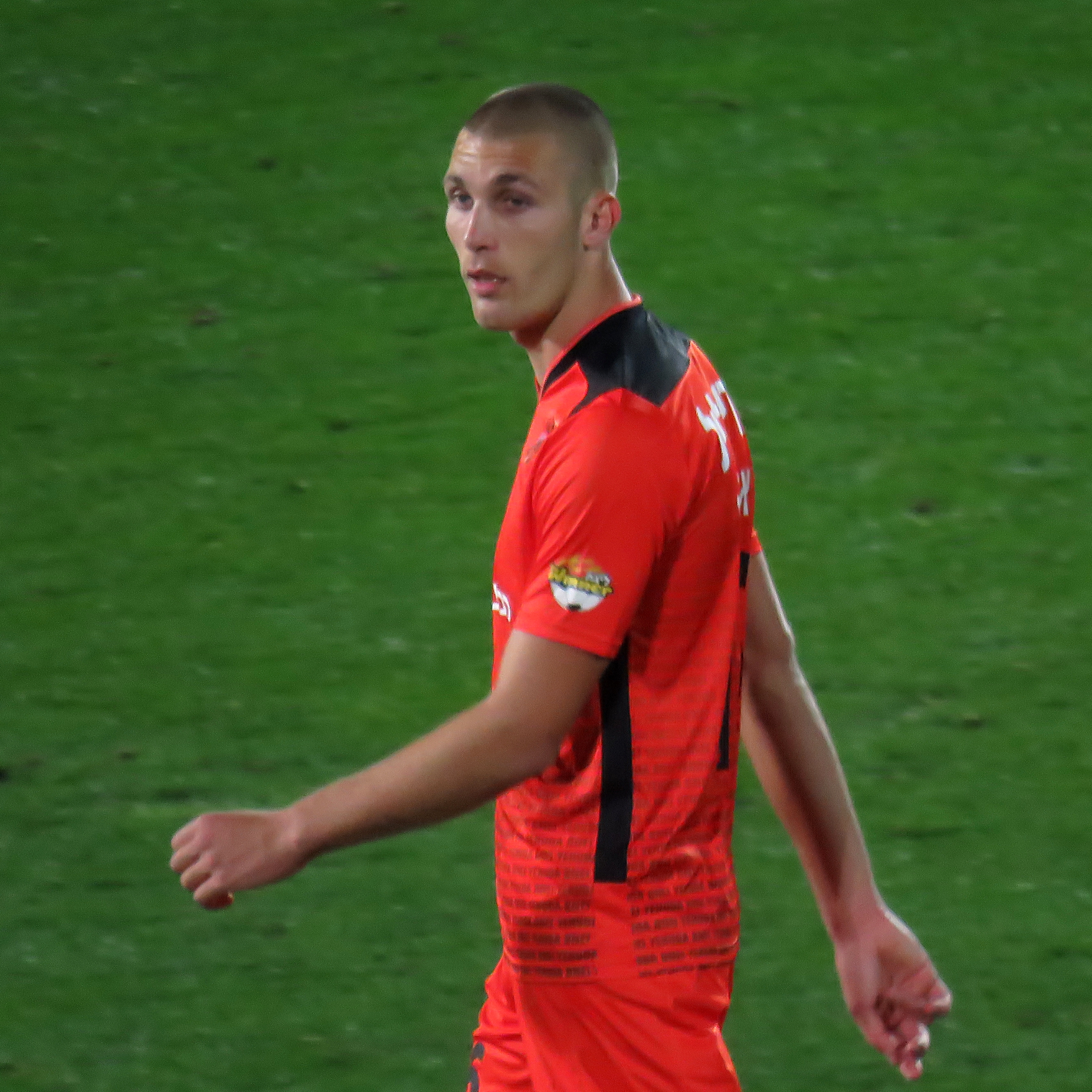

Personal information
- Full name: Ben Grabli
- Date of birth: April 8, 1994 (age 32)
- Place of birth: Beersheba, Israel
- Height: 1.90 m (6 ft 3 in)
- Position: Center back

Team information
- Current team: F.C. Dimona

Youth career
- 2006–2013: Hapoel Be'er Sheva

Senior career*
Years	Team	Apps	(Gls)
2013–2015	Hapoel Be'er Sheva	8	(0)
2014–2015	→ Hapoel Ramat HaSharon (loan)	22	(0)
2015–2017	Hapoel Tel Aviv	2	(0)
2016	→ Bnei Yehuda Tel Aviv (loan)	3	(0)
2016–2017	→ Hapoel Kfar Saba (loan)	1	(0)
2017	→ Hapoel Petah Tikva (loan)	10	(0)
2017–2018	Hapoel Acre	0	(0)
2018	Hapoel Bnei Lod	26	(1)
2019	Hapoel Iksal	8	(0)
2019–2020	Hapoel Bnei Lod	7	(0)
2020	Hapoel Ashkelon	13	(0)
2021	Hapoel Marmorek	14	(2)
2021	F.C. Dimona	13	(0)
2021–2022	Bnei Eilat	15	(1)
2022–2023	Maccabi Herzliya	26	(1)
2023	Ironi Mod'in	4	(0)
2024	Maccabi Sha'arayim	17	(1)
2024	Beitar Kiryat Gat	8	(1)
2024–	Maccabi Be'er Sheva	0	(0)

International career
2015–2017	Israel U21	1	(0)
- * Club domestic league appearances and goals as of 12 February 2025

Ben Grabli (Hebrew: בן גרבלי; born 8 April 1994) is an Israeli footballer who currently plays at Maccabi Sha'arayim.
