= Yoav Hofmayster =

Israeli footballer

Personal information
- Date of birth: 25 December 2000 (age 25)
- Place of birth: Hod HaSharon, Israel
- Height: 1.82 m (6 ft 0 in)
- Position: Defensive midfielder

Youth career
- 2009–2015: Hapoel Hod HaSharon
- 2015–2019: Maccabi Tel Aviv

Senior career*
Years	Team	Apps	(Gls)
2019–2020	Maccabi Tel Aviv	0	(0)
2019–2020	→ Beitar Tel Aviv Bat Yam (loan)	1	(0)
2020	→ Hapoel Ramat HaSharon (loan)	16	(0)
2020–2022	LASK	0	(0)
2020–2021	→ Ironi Kiryat Shmona (loan)	29	(0)
2021–2022	→ Hapoel Tel Aviv (loan)	12	(0)
2022	→ Maccabi Petah Tikva (loan)	10	(0)
2022–2023	Ironi Kiryat Shmona	27	(0)
2023–2025	Korona Kielce	47	(1)

International career^{‡}
2018–2019	Israel U19	10	(0)
2022–2023	Israel U21	10	(0)
2024–	Israel	1	(0)
- * Club domestic league appearances and goals as of 09:24, 27 May 2025 (UTC) ‡ National team caps and goals as of 8 June 2024

Yoav Hofmayster (Hebrew: יואב הופמייסטר; born 25 December 2000) is an Israeli professional footballer who plays as a defensive midfielder.

== Club career ==
On 2 February 2022, Hofmayster joined Maccabi Petah Tikva on loan until the end of the season.

On 25 July 2023, he signed a two-year deal with Polish Ekstraklasa side Korona Kielce. Hofmayster left the club at the end of June 2025, after failing to agree on a new contract.

== International career ==
A former under-19 and under-21 international, Hofmayster received his first senior team call-up in June 2024. He made his debut on 8 June, playing the first 30 minutes of a 0–3 friendly loss to Hungary.

== Career statistics ==
=== International ===
As of match played 8 June 2024

Appearances and goals by national team and year
National team	Year	Apps	Goals
Israel
Israel	2024	1	0
Total		1	0
