= Amit Keren =

Israeli physicist

- עמית קרן
- Occupation: Professor

Academic background
- Education: Columbia University (1986)
- Doctoral advisor: Tomo Uemura

Academic work
- Discipline: Physics
- Sub-discipline: Magnetism and conduction
- Institutions: Technion – Israel Institute of Technology

Amit Keren (Hebrew: עמית קרן) is an Israeli Professor of Physics in the Department of Physics Technion-Israel Institute of Technology. He is an experimentalist investigating mostly the properties of magnetic and superconducting material.

He worked on compounds such as spin glasses, frustrated magnets, molecular magnets, and superconductors. He uses experiential techniques such as muon, electron, and nuclear spin resonance, magnetometers, transport, neutron scattering, various kinds of x-ray scattering and photoemission. He also operates a single crystal growth lab.

== Education ==
Amit Keren received his B.Sc. in Physics and Mathematic in 1986 from Tel Aviv University, his doctorate in 1994 from Columbia University under the supervision of Tomo Uemura, and was a postdoctoral fellow at Orsay University Paris, under the supervisor of Henry Alloul until 1997.

== Research work ==
Common energy scale for magnetism and superconductivity: The Keren group demonstrated experimentally that superconductivity and magnetism in the high temperature cuprate superconductors share a common energy scale, namely, the critical temperature and the superexchange interaction strength are proportional to each other. This finding is backed by many different experiments.

Mapping exotic spin correlations in spin glasses: Keren and collaborators found experimentally that close to the spin glass transition temperature, the field-time-dependent polarization of a probing spin scales like their ratio. They interpreted this behavior using power law correlation function.

Muon relaxation in a stochastic field environment: When a spin polarized muon enters a magnetic sample, it loses its polarization. The analytical relation between the muon polarization and the stochastic properties of the field is known as the Keren function.

Stiffnessometer: When the current in a very long coil, which pierces a superconducting ring, is turned on, a persistent current is generated in the ring. The amount of current depends on the superconductor stiffness. By measuring this current via the magnetic moment of the ring the stiffness can be determined. The Keren group developed an instrument based on these principles
