= Liran Rotman =

Israeli footballer

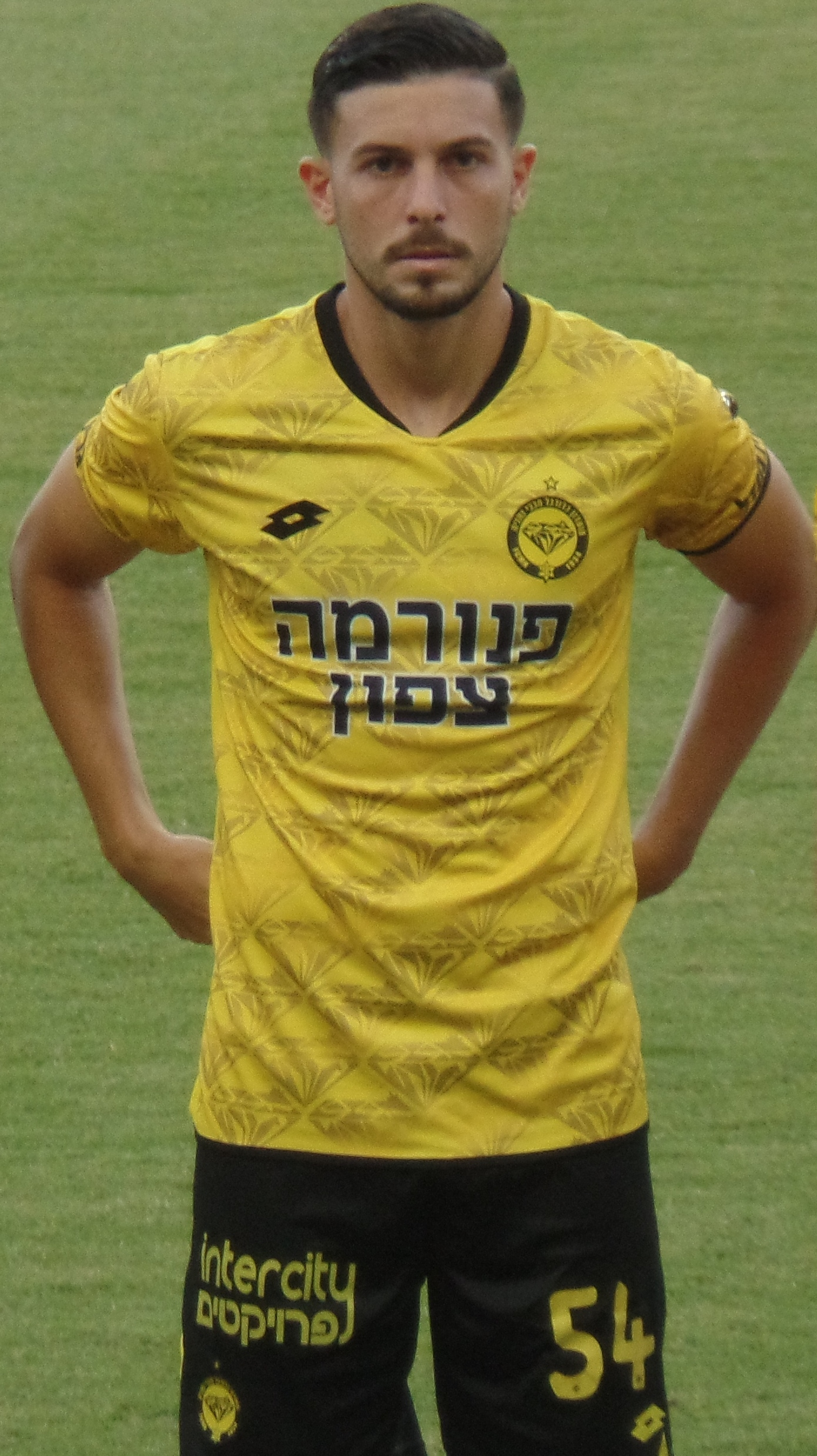
- Rotman with Maccabi Netanya in 2022

Personal information
- Full name: Liran Rotman
- Date of birth: 7 June 1996 (age 30)
- Place of birth: Ness Ziona, Israel
- Height: 1.73 m (5 ft 8 in)
- Position: Midfielder

Team information
- Current team: Hapoel Haifa
- Number: 26

Youth career
- Hapoel Rishon LeZion
- Sektzia Ness Ziona

Senior career*
Years	Team	Apps	(Gls)
2013–2015	Sektzia Ness Ziona	2	(0)
2015–2019	Maccabi Petah Tikva	25	(2)
2017–2018	→ Hapoel Ramat Gan	33	(4)
2019–2022	Beitar Jerusalem	58	(4)
2021	→ Hapoel Hadera (loan)	15	(5)
2022–2024	Maccabi Netanya	55	(11)
2024–2026	Hapoel Tel Aviv	41	(9)
2026-	Hapoel Haifa	11	(3)
- * Club domestic league appearances and goals as of 24 June 2026

Liran Rotman (Hebrew: לירן רוטמן; born 7 June 1996) is an Israeli professional footballer who plays as a midfielder for Ligat Ha'Al club Hapoel Haifa.

== Early life ==
Rotman was born in Ness Ziona, Israel, to a family of Ashkenazi Jewish descent.

== Club career ==
Rotman join up to Hapoel Rishon LeZion, when he was child. At the age of 14, Rotman moved to Sektzia Ness Ziona. On 2 May 2014, he made his senior debut in the 2–0 victory against F.C. Kafr Qasim.

In January 2015, Rotman signed in the Israeli Premier League club Maccabi Petah Tikva. On 1 June 2020 he made his senior debut while entering as a substitute in the 87th minute in the 2–0 victory against Maccabi Tel Aviv in a game in which he also managed to score. Rotman scored a goal in the 3–0 victory against Ironi Kiryat Shmona in the 2015–16 Toto Cup Al final, on 2 February 2016. In that season, Rotman played 9 games in all competitions in which he started in 4 of them.

In summer 2017, Rotman was loaned to the Liga Leumit club Hapoel Ramat Gan until the end of the season. On 3 August 2017, Rotman made his debut in Ramat Gan in a Toto Cup Leumit match against Hapoel Tel Aviv, which ended in a 0–0 result.

In summer 2018, Rotman returned to Maccabi Petah Tikva.

On 27 February 2019, Rotman signed in Beitar Jerusalem and it was agreed that he would move there at the end of the season. On 28 July 2019, Rotman made his debut in Beitar in the 2–1 victory against his youth team, Sektzia Ness Ziona. On 22 December 2019 he scored his debut goal in Beitar in the 5–0 victory against Hapoel Rishon LeZion.

== Statistics ==
=== Club ===
As of 1 June 2024

Club	Season	League	League		Cup		League Cup		Continental		Total	
Club	Season	League	Apps	Goals	Apps	Goals	Apps	Goals	Apps	Goals	Apps	Goals
Sektzia Ness Ziona	2013–14	Liga Alef	1	1	0	0	0	0	0	0	1	1
Sektzia Ness Ziona	2014–15	Liga Alef	1	0	1	0	0	0	0	0	2	0
Maccabi Petah Tikva	2014–15	Israeli Premier League	1	1	0	0	0	0	0	0	1	1
Maccabi Petah Tikva	2015–16	Israeli Premier League	5	0	0	0	4	0	0	0	9	0
Maccabi Petah Tikva	2016–17	Israeli Premier League	6	1	0	0	0	0	0	0	6	1
Hapoel Ramat Gan	2017–18	Liga Leumit	33	4	2	0	6	3	0	0	41	7
Maccabi Petah Tikva	2018–19	Israeli Premier League	13	1	4	0	3	0	0	0	20	1
Beitar Jerusalem	2019–20	Israeli Premier League	20	0	2	1	6	0	0	0	28	1
Beitar Jerusalem	2020–21	Israeli Premier League	14	0	0	0	4	0	0	0	18	0
Hapoel Hadera	2020–21	Israeli Premier League	15	5	1	0	0	0	1	0	17	5
Beitar Jerusalem	2021–22	Israeli Premier League	24	4	2	0	3	0	0	0	29	4
Maccabi Netanya	2022–23	Israeli Premier League	29	7	4	1	3	0	1	0	37	8
Maccabi Netanya	2023–24	Israeli Premier League	26	4	4	0	3	0	0	0	33	4
Hapoel Tel Aviv	2024–25	Liga Leumit	0	0	0	0	0	0	0	0	0	0
Career Total			188	28	20	2	32	3	2	0	242	33

== Honours ==
=== Club ===
Maccabi Petah Tikva

- Toto Cup Al: 2015–16

Beitar Jerusalem

- Toto Cup Al: 2019–20

Maccabi Netanya

- Toto Cup Al: 2022–23

== See also ==
- List of Jewish footballers
- List of Jews in sports
- List of Israelis
