= Gilchrist Nguema =

Gabonese footballer (born 1996)

Personal information
- Full name: Gilchrist Nguema
- Date of birth: 7 August 1996 (age 30)
- Place of birth: Libreville, Gabon
- Height: 1.93 m (6 ft 4 in)
- Position: Center back

Team information
- Current team: Maccabi Ahi Nazareth
- Number: 5

Youth career
- Benfica
- Casa Pia

Senior career*
Years	Team	Apps	(Gls)
2015–2016	Villanovense	6	(1)
2016–2017	Tourizense	19	(0)
2017–2018	Sertanense		
2018–2019	Benfica de Macau	18	(4)
2019–2020	Bnei Sakhnin	18	(1)
2020–2021	Maccabi Ahi Nazareth	34	(2)
2026–	Benfica de Macau	3	(0)

International career^{‡}
2018–	Gabon	4	(0)
- * Club domestic league appearances and goals as of 09:41, 12 July 2020 (UTC) ‡ National team caps and goals as of 09:42, 12 July 2020 (UTC)

Gilchrist Nguema (born 7 August 1996) is a Gabonese international footballer who plays for Benfica de Macau, as a centre back.

== Club career ==
Born in Libreville, Nguema played for Villanovense, Tourizense and Sertanense.

In 2018 Nguema played for the Liga de Elite club Benfica de Macau and won the 2018 season.

On 7 August 2019, Nguema signed in the Liga Leumit club Bnei Sakhnin. On 22 January 2021, Nguema signed for Maccabi Ahi Nazareth.

== International career ==
On 12 November 2020, Nguema made his international debut for Gabon.

== Honours ==
Benfica de Macau

- Liga de Elite: 2018
