= Yuval Sade =

Israeli footballer

Personal information
- Date of birth: 10 May 2000 (age 26)
- Place of birth: Herzliya, Israel
- Height: 1.85 m (6 ft 1 in)
- Positions: Defensive midfielder; centre-back

Team information
- Current team: Hà Nội
- Number: 36

Youth career
- –2011: Maccabi Herzliya
- 2011–2019: Hapoel Ramat HaSharon

Senior career*
Years	Team	Apps	(Gls)
2018–2019	Hapoel Ramat HaSharon	7	(0)
2019–2026	Maccabi Netanya	134	(7)
2020	→ Hapoel Ramat HaSharon (loan)	16	(0)
2026	CFR Cluj	0	(0)
2026–	Hanoi FC	6	(1)

International career
2019	Israel U19	3	(0)
2021–2023	Israel U21	7	(0)
- * Club domestic league appearances and goals as of 5 September 2026

Yuval Sade (Hebrew: יובל שדה; born 10 May 2000) is an Israeli professional footballer who plays as a defensive midfielder or a centre-back for V.League 1 club Hà Nội.

== Career statistics ==
As of match played 5 September 2026

Appearances and goals by club, season and competition
Club	Season	League			Israel State Cup		Toto Cup		Europe		Other		Total	
Club	Season	Division	Apps	Goals	Apps	Goals	Apps	Goals	Apps	Goals	Apps	Goals	Apps	Goals
Hapoel Ramat HaSharon	2018–19	Liga Leumit	7	0	0	0	0	0	—		—		7	0
Maccabi Netanya	2019–20	Israeli Premier League	1	0	0	0	3	0	—		—		4	0
Maccabi Netanya	2020–21	Israeli Premier League	28	2	0	0	4	0	—		—		32	2
Maccabi Netanya	2021–22	Israeli Premier League	21	1	1	0	4	0	—		—		26	1
Maccabi Netanya	2022–23	Israeli Premier League	17	0	4	0	1	0	2 (Note: Appearances in UEFA Conference League)	0	—		24	0
Maccabi Netanya	2023–24	Israeli Premier League	11	0	4	0	1	0	—		—		16	0
Maccabi Netanya	2024–25	Israeli Premier League	30	3	2	0	5	1	—		—		37	4
Maccabi Netanya	2025–26	Israeli Premier League	26	1	2	0	5	1	—		—		33	2
Maccabi Netanya	Total		134	7	13	0	23	2	2	0	—		172	9
Hapoel Ramat HaSharon (loan)	2019–20	Liga Leumit	16	0	0	0	—		—		—		16	0
CFR Cluj	2026–27	Liga I	0	0	—		0	0	—		—		0	0
Hanoi FC	2026–27	V.League 1	1	0	0	0	—		—		—		1	0
Career total			158	7	13	0	23	2	2	0	—		196	9

== Honours ==
Maccabi Netanya

- Israel State Cup runner-up: 2022–23
- Toto Cup: 2022–23
