= Amir Khalaila =

Israeli footballer

Personal information
- Date of birth: 21 March 1997 (age 29)
- Place of birth: Sakhnin, Israel
- Height: 1.77 m (5 ft 9 1/2 in)
- Position: Striker

Team information
- Current team: Maccabi Tamra

Youth career
- Bnei Sakhnin

Senior career*
Years	Team	Apps	(Gls)
2014–2016	Bnei Sakhnin	9	(0)
2017–2019	Hapoel Be'er Sheva	1	(1)
2017	→ Hapoel Ramat Gan	10	(1)
2018	→ Bnei Sakhnin	3	(0)
2018–2019	→ Hapoel Acre	11	(2)
2019	→ Hapoel Iksal	19	(5)
2019–2020	Hapoel Bnei Lod	5	(0)
2020	Hapoel Kaukab	4	(1)
2020–2021	Bnei Yehuda	0	(0)
2021	Hapoel Rishon LeZion	13	(2)
2021–2022	F.C. Dimona	17	(3)
2022–2023	Shimshon Kfar Qasim	11	(0)
2024–	Maccabi Tamra	13	(6)
- * Club domestic league appearances and goals as of 15 May 2024

Amir Khalaila (Arabic: أمير خلايلة; born 21 March 1997) is an Israeli footballer who plays as a striker.
