= Eylon Yerushalmi =

Israeli footballer

Personal information
- Full name: Eylon Yerushalmi
- Date of birth: March 10, 1997 (age 29)
- Place of birth: Ramat Gan, Israel
- Position: Attacking midfielder

Team information
- Current team: Maccabi Herzliya
- Number: 7

Youth career
- 2006–2014: Maccabi Tel Aviv
- 2014–2016: Maccabi Netanya

Senior career*
Years	Team	Apps	(Gls)
2016–2021	Maccabi Netanya	27	(0)
2017–2018	→ Hapoel Hadera	30	(2)
2019–2020	→ Sektzia Ness Ziona	8	(0)
2020	→ Hapoel Umm al-Fahm	13	(0)
2021–2022	Hapoel Ramat Gan	35	(1)
2022–2023	Sektzia Ness Ziona	9	(1)
2023–2024	Maccabi Herzliya	29	(5)
2024–2025	Maccabi Jaffa	17	(2)
2025–	Maccabi Herzliya	55	(12)

International career
2013	Israel U-17	4	(2)
2015	Israel U-19	10	(1)
- * Club domestic league appearances and goals as of 24 June 2026

Eylon Yerushalmi (Hebrew: אילון ירושלמי; born 10 March 1997) is an Israeli footballer who plays for Maccabi Herzliya.
