= Abed Jabarin =

Israeli footballer

Abed Jabarin عبد جبارين
Personal information
- Full name: Abed Jabarin
- Date of birth: December 19, 1998 (age 27)
- Place of birth: Umm al-Fahm, Israel
- Positions: Attacking midfielder; striker

Team information
- Current team: Hapoel Umm al-Fahm

Youth career
- 2007–2009: Maccabi Umm al-Fahm
- 2009–2013: Maccabi Haifa
- 2013–: Maccabi Netanya

Senior career*
Years	Team	Apps	(Gls)
2015–2021	Maccabi Netanya	6	(0)
2017–2018	→ Hapoel Jerusalem (loan)	23	(5)
2018–2019	→ Ironi Tiberias (loan)	29	(6)
2019–2021	→ Hapoel Umm al-Fahm (loan)	49	(1)

International career
2016	Israel U-19	3	(0)
- * Club domestic league appearances and goals

Abed Jabarin (Arabic: عبد جبارين, Hebrew: עבד ג'בארין; born December 19, 1998) is an Israeli footballer who plays for Hapoel Umm al-Fahm.

Jabarin made his debut for Netanya on November 28, 2015, in a league game against Maccabi Haifa.
