= 2015–16 Beitar Jerusalem F.C. season =

Beitar Jerusalem
2015–16 season
- Chairman: Eli Tabib
- Manager: Slobodan Drapić
- Ligat Ha'Al: 3rd
- State Cup: Eighth round
- Toto Cup: Semi final
- Europa League: Second Qualifying round vs Charleroi
- Top goalscorer: League: Nikita Rukavytsya (11 goals); All: Nikita Rukavytsya (14 goals)
- Highest home attendance: 21,000 vs Hapoel Tel Aviv (24 August 2015)
- Lowest home attendance: 4,000 vs Hapoel Haifa (12 September 2015)
| Home colours | Away colours |

The 2015–16 season is Beitar Jerusalem's 47th season in the Israeli Premier League. The club's owner Eli Tabib in June said he would sell the team to someone that will invest money in the club. However, he later changed his mind and decided to continue investing in the squad and not abandon the team. Beitar then signed eight players in pre-season: Liroy Zhairi, Nes Zamir, Dovev Gabay, Uri Magbo, Daniel Askling, Vlad Morar, Nisso Kapiloto, Pablo de Lucas and Jesus Rueda.

== First team ==
As of 25 January 2016

Note: Flags indicate national team as defined under FIFA eligibility rules; some limited exceptions apply. Players may hold more than one non-FIFA nationality.

| No. | Pos. | Nation | Player |
|---|---|---|---|
| 1 | GK | ISR | Boris Klaiman |
| 3 | MF | ISR | David Keltjens |
| 4 | DF | ESP | Jesús Rueda |
| 5 | DF | ISR | Nisso Kapiloto |
| 6 | DF | ISR | Tal Kachila |
| 7 | MF | ISR | Omer Atzili (Captain) |
| 8 | MF | ISR | Liroy Zhairi |
| 9 | FW | ISR | Itay Shechter |
| 11 | MF | ISR | Dan Einbinder |
| 12 | FW | ISR | Avishay Cohen |
| 13 | FW | AUS | Nikita Rukavytsya |
| 14 | MF | BRA | Claudemir |

| No. | Pos. | Nation | Player |
|---|---|---|---|
| 15 | MF | ISR | Ness Zamir |
| 16 | FW | ISR | Dovev Gabay |
| 17 | MF | ISR | Lidor Cohen |
| 18 | FW | ISR | Roei Zikri |
| 20 | FW | ISR | Omer Nachmani |
| 22 | GK | ISR | Stav Shushan |
| 26 | DF | ISR | Elad Gabai |
| 28 | DF | ISR | Snir Mishan |
| 77 | DF | ISR | Uri Magbo |
| 81 | DF | SRB | Dušan Matović (Vice-Captain) |
| 90 | DF | ISR | Joakim Askling |
| — | FW | NED | Arsenio Valpoort |

=== On loan ===
Note: Flags indicate national team as defined under FIFA eligibility rules; some limited exceptions apply. Players may hold more than one non-FIFA nationality.

| No. / Pos. / Nation / Player; — / DF / ISR / Matan Toledano (to Hakoah Amidar Ramat Gan) | No. / Pos. / Nation / Player; — / FW / ISR / Bar Shalom (to Maccabi Sha'arayim) |

== Transfers ==
=== Summer ===
In: Note: Flags indicate national team as defined under FIFA eligibility rules; some limited exceptions apply. Players may hold more than one non-FIFA nationality.

| No. | Pos. | Nation | Player |
|---|---|---|---|
| 4 | DF | ESP | Jesús Rueda (from (Spain) Real Valladolid) |
| 5 | DF | ISR | Nisso Kapiloto (from (Switzerland) St. Gallen) |
| 13 | FW | AUS | Nikita Rukavytsya (from (Australia) Western Sydney Wanderers) |
| 15 | MF | ISR | Ness Zamir (from (Israel) Bnei Yehuda Tel Aviv) |
| 16 | FW | ISR | Dovev Gabay (from (Israel) Hapoel Be'er Sheva) |
| 18 | MF | ISR | Liroy Zhairi (from (Israel) Hapoel Petah Tikva) |
| 26 | DF | ISR | Elad Gabai (from (Israel) Maccabi Haifa) |
| 70 | FW | ROU | Vlad Morar (from (Romania) Universitatea Cluj) |
| 77 | MF | ISR | Uri Magbo (from (Israel) Beitar Tel Aviv Ramla) |
| 90 | DF | SWE | Joakim Askling (from (Israel) Beitar Tel Aviv Ramla) |
| 91 | MF | ESP | Pablo de Lucas (from (Romania) Petrolul Ploiești) |
| — | DF | ESP | Fran González (Trial) |

Out: Note: Flags indicate national team as defined under FIFA eligibility rules; some limited exceptions apply. Players may hold more than one non-FIFA nationality.

| No. | Pos. | Nation | Player |
|---|---|---|---|
| 2 | DF | ISR | Eli Dasa (to (Israel) Maccabi Tel Aviv) |
| 4 | DF | ISR | Ze'ev Haimovich (to (Israel) Hapoel Ra'anana) |
| 5 | DF | ESP | César Arzo (to (Greece) AEK Athens) |
| 8 | MF | ISR | Shlomi Azulay (to (Israel) Maccabi Tel Aviv) |
| 10 | MF | ISR | Hanan Maman (to (Israel) Hapoel Haifa) |
| 18 | DF | ISR | Ben Malka (to (Israel) Hapoel Petah Tikva) |
| 24 | DF | ISR | Ofir Kriaf |
| 28 | FW | ROU | Liviu Antal (loan return to (Turkey) Gençlerbirliği) |
| 77 | GK | ISR | Ben Rahav (to (Israel) Hapoel Kfar Saba) |

== Pre-season and friendlies ==
| 22 June 2015 | Beitar Jerusalem (Israel) | 3–1 | (Israel) F.C. Ashdod |
| | L. Cohen 28'; Zamir 70'; Ozeri 78' | Report (Hebrew) | Awad 38' | Referee: Idan Elmalem |

| 10 July 2015 | Maccabi Netanya (Israel) | 3–3 | (Israel) Beitar Jerusalem |
| | Kayode 16'; E. Levy 31' (pen.); Abu Abaid 87' | Report (Hebrew) | Atzili 72'; Nachmani 80', 90' |

| 3 September 2015 | Maccabi Petah Tikva (Israel) | 1–4 | (Israel) Beitar Jerusalem |
| | Jakobovich 1' | Report (Hebrew) | L. Cohen 2'; Nachmani 43', 55'; Zamir 83' | Referee: Alon Yefet |

| 21 October 2015 | Israel U-21 | 2–3 | (Israel) Beitar Jerusalem | Netanya |
| | | Report (Hebrew) | I. Cohen (?); L. Cohen (?) |

== Competitions ==
=== Ligat Ha'Al ===
==== Results ====
| 24 August 2015 1 | Beitar Jerusalem | 0–0 | Hapoel Tel Aviv | Jerusalem |
| 20:55 IDT | | Summary; Report (Hebrew) | | Stadium: Teddy Stadium; Attendance: 21,000; Referee: Ziv Adler |

| 30 August 2015 2 | Maccabi Netanya | 0–0 | Beitar Jerusalem | Netanya |
| 20:15 IDT | | Summary; Report (Hebrew) | | Stadium: Netanya Stadium; Attendance: 7,700; Referee: Erez Papier |

| 12 September 2015 3 | Beitar Jerusalem | 1–1 | Hapoel Haifa | Jerusalem |
| 20:00 IDT | Atzili 86' | Summary; Report (Hebrew) | Swisa 41' | Stadium: Teddy Stadium; Attendance: 4,000; Referee: Liran Liany |

| 19 September 2015 4 | Bnei Yehuda | 2–1 | Beitar Jerusalem | Tel Aviv |
| 20:00 IDT | Galván 49'; Agayov 57' | Summary; Report (Hebrew) | L. Cohen 20' | Stadium: Bloomfield Stadium; Attendance: 7,000; Referee: Orel Greenfeld |

| 28 September 2015 5 | Beitar Jerusalem | 3–1 | Hapoel Kfar Saba | Jerusalem |
| 20:45 IDT | Zhairi 3'; Rueda 29'; Rukavytsya 40' | Summary; Report (Hebrew) | R. Cohen 79' | Stadium: Teddy Stadium; Attendance: 5,500; Referee: Tzvika Levi |

| 5 October 2015 6 | Bnei Sakhnin | 1–3 | Beitar Jerusalem | Sakhnin |
| 20:55 IDT | Azulay 45' | Summary; Report (Hebrew) | Gabay 21'; Atzili 55', 64' | Stadium: Doha Stadium; Attendance: 7,000; Referee: Liran Liany |

| 19 October 2015 7 | Beitar Jerusalem | 1–3 | Hapoel Be'er Sheva | Jerusalem |
| 20:55 IDT | Rukavytsya 59' | Summary; Report (Hebrew) | Melikson 17'; Nwakaeme 22'; Barda 52' | Stadium: Teddy Stadium; Attendance: 12,000; Referee: Ziv Adler |

| 26 October 2015 8 | Maccabi Tel Aviv | 2–4 | Beitar Jerusalem | Tel Aviv |
| 20:55 IST | Zahavi 32', 39' | Summary; Report (Hebrew) | Rukavytsya 18', 45+1', 58'; L. Cohen 65' | Stadium: Bloomfield Stadium; Attendance: 12,820; Referee: Guy Berger |

| 2 November 2015 9 | Beitar Jerusalem | 1–0 | Hapoel Ra'anana | Petah Tikva |
| 20:30 IST | L. Cohen 11' | Summary; Report (Hebrew) | | Stadium: HaMoshava Stadium; Attendance: 6,000; Referee: Eitan Shemeulevitch |

| 7 November 2015 10 | Maccabi Haifa | 0–2 | Beitar Jerusalem | Haifa |
| 20:55 IST | | Summary; Report (Hebrew) | Gabay 85'; Atzili 90' | Stadium: Sammy Ofer Stadium; Attendance: 29,300; Referee: Alon Yefet |

| 22 November 2015 11 | Beitar Jerusalem | 1–0 | Hapoel Acre | Jerusalem |
| 20:30 IST | Gabai 90+3' | Summary; Report (Hebrew) | | Stadium: Teddy Stadium; Attendance: 10,000; Referee: Tzvika Levi |

| 28 November 2015 12 | Maccabi Petah Tikva | 2–0 | Beitar Jerusalem | Petah Tikva |
| 20:00 IST | Shemesh 45'; Tomas 89' | Summary; Report (Hebrew) | Keltjens (yellow card) 51' (yellow-red card) 77' | Stadium: HaMoshava Stadium; Attendance: 10,000; Referee: Roi Reinshreiber |

| 6 December 2015 13 | Beitar Jerusalem | 2–0 | Ironi Kiryat Shmona | Jerusalem |
| 20:15 IST | L. Cohen 48'; Atzili 60' (pen.) | Summary; Report (Hebrew) | | Stadium: Teddy Stadium; Attendance: 4,500; Referee: Menashe Mashiah |

| 12 December 2015 14 | Hapoel Tel Aviv | 0–0 | Beitar Jerusalem | Tel Aviv |
| 20:15 IST | | Summary; Report (Hebrew) | | Stadium: Bloomfield Stadium; Attendance: 10,220; Referee: Erez Papier |

| 19 December 2015 15 | Beitar Jerusalem | 1–0 | Maccabi Netanya | Jerusalem |
| 20:00 IST | Matović 33' | Summary; Report (Hebrew) | | Stadium: Teddy Stadium; Attendance: 8,000; Referee: Eitan Shemeulevitch |

| 26 December 2015 16 | Hapoel Haifa | 1–1 | Beitar Jerusalem | Haifa |
| 20:00 IST | Lala 40'; Megrelashvili (yellow card) ?' (yellow-red card) 90' | Summary; Report (Hebrew) | Rukavytsya 76' | Stadium: Sammy Ofer Stadium; Attendance: 7,300; Referee: Orel Greenfeld |

| 2 January 2016 17 | Beitar Jerusalem | 1–0 | Bnei Yehuda | Jerusalem |
| 19:30 IST | Atzili 24' (pen.) | Summary; Report (Hebrew) | | Stadium: Teddy Stadium; Attendance: 2,500; Referee: Liran Wachsberger |

| 10 January 2016 18 | Hapoel Kfar Saba | 1–0 | Beitar Jerusalem | Kfar Saba |
| 20:15 IST | Itzhak 39'; Papadopoulos (yellow card) 1' (yellow-red card) 50' | Summary; Report (Hebrew) | | Stadium: Levita Stadium; Attendance: 4,000; Referee: Oren Siminyan |

| 16 January 2016 19 | Beitar Jerusalem | 1–0 | Bnei Sakhnin | Petah Tikva |
| 20:55 IST | L. Cohen 34' | Summary; Report (Hebrew) | | Stadium: HaMoshava Stadium; Attendance: 7,500; Referee: Ziv Adler |

| 24 January 2016 20 | Hapoel Be'er Sheva | 2–1 | Beitar Jerusalem | Be'er Sheva |
| 20:55 IST | Buzaglo 12'; Nwakaeme 51' | Summary; Report (Hebrew) | Matović 90+2' | Stadium: Turner Stadium; Attendance: 15,409; Referee: Alon Yefet |

| 1 February 2016 21 | Beitar Jerusalem | 2–2 | Maccabi Tel Aviv | Jerusalem |
| 20:55 IST | Atzili 35'; Keltjens 47' | Summary; Report (Hebrew) | Zahavi 24', 69'; Igiebor (red card) 90+2' | Stadium: Teddy Stadium; Referee: Roi Reinshreiber |

| 8 February 2016 22 | Hapoel Ra'anana | 0–2 | Beitar Jerusalem | Netanya |
| 20:30 IST | | Summary; Report (Hebrew) | Rukavytsya 13'; Shechter 84' | Stadium: Netanya Stadium; Attendance: 4,000; Referee: Na'al Uda |

| 15 February 2016 23 | Beitar Jerusalem | 3–0 | Maccabi Haifa | Petah Tikva |
| 20:55 IST | Shechter 32'; Rukavytsya 51'; Einbinder 81' | Summary; Report (Hebrew) | | Stadium: HaMoshava Stadium; Attendance: 9,000; Referee: Eitan Shemeulevitch |

| 21 February 2016 24 | Hapoel Acre | 1–3 | Beitar Jerusalem | Akko |
| 20:15 IST | Jovanović 53' | Summary; Report (Hebrew) | Mishaelof 8' (o.g.); Rukavytsya 46'; Gabay 90+5' | Stadium: Acre Municipal Stadium; Attendance: 5,000; Referee: Alon Yefet |

| 27 February 2016 25 | Beitar Jerusalem | 2–0 | Maccabi Petah Tikva | Jerusalem |
| 20:00 IST | Claudemir 29'; Rukavytsya 50' | Summary; Report (Hebrew) | | Stadium: Teddy Stadium; Attendance: 10,000; Referee: Oren Siminyan |

| 5 March 2016 26 | Ironi Kiryat Shmona | 0–2 | Beitar Jerusalem | Kiryat Shmona |
| 20:00 IST | | Summary; Report (Hebrew) | Claudemir 45+1'; Rukavytsya 65' | Stadium: Kiryat Shmona Municipal Stadium; Attendance: 4,200; Referee: Liran Liany |

1. Beitar Jerusalem hosted round 9 outside Jerusalem due to reseeding of the grass at Teddy Stadium.
2. Beitar Jerusalem hosted round 19 outside Jerusalem as a punishment for racial slurs by their fans in the match against Maccabi Netanya.
3. Beitar Jerusalem hosted round 23 outside Jerusalem as a punishment for racial slurs by their fans in the match against Bnei Sakhnin.

==== League table ====
| Pos | Team | Pld | W | D | L | GF | GA | GD | Pts | Qualification or relegation |
|---|---|---|---|---|---|---|---|---|---|---|
| 1 | Hapoel Be'er Sheva | 26 | 20 | 4 | 2 | 48 | 17 | +31 | 64 | Qualification for the championship round |
| 2 | Maccabi Tel Aviv | 26 | 19 | 4 | 3 | 59 | 20 | +39 | 61 | Qualification for the championship round |
| 3 | Beitar Jerusalem | 26 | 15 | 6 | 5 | 38 | 19 | +19 | 51 | Qualification for the championship round |
| 4 | Maccabi Haifa | 26 | 10 | 8 | 8 | 33 | 25 | +8 | 38 | Qualification for the championship round |
| 5 | Bnei Sakhnin | 26 | 10 | 6 | 10 | 32 | 25 | +7 | 36 | Qualification for the championship round |

Source: Israel Football Association, Soccerway
Rules for classification: 1) Points; 2) Goal difference; 3) Matches won; 4) Goals scored; 5) Head-to-head points; 6) Head-to-head goal difference; 7) Head-to-head goals scored; 8) Play-off.

==== Top playoff ====
| 14 March 2016 27 | Beitar Jerusalem | 3–2 | Maccabi Haifa | Jerusalem |
| 20:55 IST | Einbinder 5'; Rukavytsya 7'; Valpoort 47' | Summary; Report (Hebrew) | Benayoun 13'; Keinan 37'; Lavi (red card) 43' | Stadium: Teddy Stadium; Attendance: 20,000; Referee: Eli Hachmon |

| 19 March 2016 28 | Bnei Sakhnin | 2–0 | Beitar Jerusalem | Sakhnin |
| 20:00 IST | Amasha 61'; Azulay 80' | Summary | | Stadium: Doha Stadium; Attendance: 7,500; Referee: Roi Reinshreiber |

| 4 April 2016 29 | Beitar Jerusalem | 0–2 | Hapoel Be'er Sheva | Jerusalem |
| 20:55 IST | | Summary | Sahar 22', 31' | Stadium: Teddy Stadium; Attendance: 18,000; Referee: Liran Liany |

| 11 April 2016 30 | Maccabi Tel Aviv | 3–2 | Beitar Jerusalem | Tel Aviv |
| 20:55 IST | Micha 10'; Zahavi 42', 90' | Summary | Rukavytsya 21' (pen.), 60' | Stadium: Bloomfield Stadium; Attendance: 13,500; Referee: Alon Yefet |

| 18 April 2016 31 | Beitar Jerusalem | 1–0 | Hapoel Ra'anana | Jerusalem |
| 20:30 IST | Gabay 72' | Summary | | Stadium: Teddy Stadium; Attendance: 4,500; Referee: Tzvika Levi |

| 24 April 2016 32 | Maccabi Haifa | 1–0 | Beitar Jerusalem | Haifa |
| 20:30 IST | Obraniak 21' | Summary; Report (Hebrew) | Rueda (red card) 63' | Stadium: Sammy Ofer Stadium; Attendance: 28,000; Referee: Shalom Ben-Avraham |

| 1 May 2016 33 | Beitar Jerusalem | 0–3 | Bnei Sakhnin | Jerusalem |
| 20:30 IST | | Summary; Report (Hebrew) | Azulay 11', 48', 72' | Stadium: Teddy Stadium; Attendance: 14,000; Referee: Menashe Mashiah |

| 9 May 2016 34 | Hapoel Be'er Sheva | 2–0 | Beitar Jerusalem | Be'er Sheva |
| 20:55 IST | Barda 78'; Hoban 83' | Summary; Report (Hebrew) | | Stadium: Turner Stadium; Attendance: 15,300; Referee: Orel Greenfeld |

| 14 May 2016 35 | Beitar Jerusalem | 0–2 | Maccabi Tel Aviv | Jerusalem |
| 19:45 IST | Rueda (red card) 57' | Summary; Report (Hebrew) | Zahavi 58' (pen.); Medunjanin 89' | Stadium: Teddy Stadium; Attendance: 6,000; Referee: Ziv Adler |

| 21 May 2016 36 | Hapoel Ra'anana | 1–2 | Beitar Jerusalem | Netanya |
| 21:00 IST | Shaker 17' | Summary; Report (Hebrew) | Valpoort 11'; Shechter 14' | Stadium: Netanya Stadium; Attendance: 800; Referee: Guy Berger |

==== Top playoff table ====
| Pos | Team | Pld | W | D | L | GF | GA | GD | Pts | Qualification |
|---|---|---|---|---|---|---|---|---|---|---|
| 1 | Hapoel Be'er Sheva (C) | 36 | 25 | 8 | 3 | 66 | 24 | +42 | 83 | Qualification for the Champions League second qualifying round |
| 2 | Maccabi Tel Aviv | 36 | 24 | 9 | 3 | 76 | 24 | +52 | 81 | Qualification for the Europa League first qualifying round |
| 3 | Beitar Jerusalem (Note: Beitar Jerusalem deducted two points because of racial slurs by their fans.) | 36 | 18 | 6 | 12 | 46 | 37 | +9 | 58 | Qualification for the Europa League first qualifying round |
| 4 | Maccabi Haifa | 36 | 14 | 11 | 11 | 45 | 42 | +3 | 53 | Qualification for the Europa League second qualifying round (Note: Maccabi Haifa qualified for the Europa League second qualifying round by winning the 2015–16 Israel State Cup.) |
| 5 | Bnei Sakhnin | 36 | 13 | 9 | 14 | 46 | 40 | +6 | 48 | |
| 6 | Hapoel Ra'anana | 36 | 11 | 9 | 16 | 38 | 48 | −10 | 42 | |

Source: Israel Football Association, Soccerway
Rules for classification: 1) Points; 2) Goal difference; 3) Matches won; 4) Goals scored; 5) Head-to-head points; 6) Head-to-head goal difference; 7) Head-to-head goals scored; 8) Play-off.
(C) Champions

=== State Cup ===
| 13 January 2016 Eighth round | Maccabi Haifa | 2–1 | Beitar Jerusalem | Haifa |
| 21:00 IST | Benayoun 16'; Ryan 21' | Summary; Report (Hebrew) | L. Cohen 9' | Stadium: Sammy Ofer Stadium; Referee: Roi Reinshreiber |

=== Toto Cup ===
| Pos | Team | Pld | W | D | L | GF | GA | GD | Pts |
|---|---|---|---|---|---|---|---|---|---|
| 1 | Maccabi Netanya (A) | 4 | 2 | 2 | 0 | 4 | 0 | +4 | 8 |
| 2 | Hapoel Be'er Sheva (A) | 4 | 2 | 1 | 1 | 7 | 3 | +4 | 7 |
| 3 | Beitar Jerusalem (A) | 4 | 2 | 0 | 2 | 2 | 6 | −4 | 6 |
| 4 | Hapoel Ra'anana | 4 | 1 | 2 | 1 | 2 | 2 | 0 | 5 |
| 5 | Hapoel Kfar Saba | 4 | 0 | 1 | 3 | 0 | 4 | −4 | 1 |

Updated to match(es) played on 17 August 2015. Source: football.org.il (in Hebrew)
Rules for classification: 1st points; 2nd goal difference; 3rd matches won; 4th goals scored; 5th head-to-head; 6th decision match
(A) Advanced to the quarter finals

| 4 August 2015 Group Stage | Maccabi Netanya | 2–0 | Beitar Jerusalem | Netanya |
| 20:50 IDT | Mizrahi 36'; Margulies 53' | Summary | | Stadium: Netanya Stadium; Referee: Daniel Bar Natan |

| 8 August 2015 Group Stage | Beitar Jerusalem | 1–0 | Hapoel Kfar Saba | Jerusalem |
| 21:00 IDT | I.Cohen 83' | Summary | | Stadium: Teddy Stadium; Referee: Ziv Adler |

| 12 August 2015 Group Stage | Hapoel Be'er Sheva | 4–0 | Beitar Jerusalem | Be'er Sheva |
| 20:50 IDT | Hoban 43'; Sahar 53'; Gordana 56'; Barda 60' | Summary | | Stadium: Turner Stadium; Referee: Erez Papier |

| 17 August 2015 Group Stage | Beitar Jerusalem | 1–0 | Hapoel Ra'anana | Jerusalem |
| 20:50 IDT | Zamir 6' | Summary | | Stadium: Teddy Stadium; Referee: Menashe Mashiah |

| 2 December 2015 Quarter final | Beitar Jerusalem | 1–1 | Hapoel Be'er Sheva | Jerusalem |
| 21:00 IST | L. Cohen 46' | Summary; Report (Hebrew) | Arbeitman 64' | Stadium: Teddy Stadium; Attendance: 2,000; Referee: Oren Siminyan |

| 16 December 2015 Quarter final | Hapoel Be'er Sheva | 1–1 (a.e.t.) (2–4 p) | Beitar Jerusalem | Be'er Sheva |
| 20:30 IST | Tzedek 90+5' | Summary | Gabay 54' | Stadium: Turner Stadium; Attendance: 9,400; Referee: Daniel Bar Natan |
| | Penalties |
| | Tzedek (penalty scored); Ogu (penalty scored); Arbeitman (penalty missed); Melikson (penalty missed) | | (penalty scored) Atzili; (penalty scored) I. Cohen; (penalty scored) Claudemir; (penalty scored) Rueda |

| 30 December 2015 Semi final | Maccabi Petah Tikva | 2–0 | Beitar Jerusalem | Netanya |
| 21:00 IST | Kanyuk 32'; Jakobovich 59' | Summary; Report (Hebrew) | | Stadium: Netanya Stadium; Attendance: 2,500; Referee: Eitan Shmuelevich |

=== UEFA Europa League ===
==== Qualifying phase ====
| 2 July 2015 First Qualifying round | Ordabasy (Kazakhstan) | 0–0 | (Israel) Beitar Jerusalem | Shymkent, Kazakhstan |
| 15:00 (UTC+3) | | Report | | Stadium: Kazhimukan Munaitpasov Stadium; Attendance: 11,600; Referee: Dumitru Muntean (Moldova) |

| 9 July 2015 First Qualifying round | Beitar Jerusalem (Israel) | 2–1 (2–1 agg.) | (Kazakhstan) Ordabasy | Jerusalem, Israel |
| 20:00 (UTC+3) | Atzili 17'; Gabay 60' | Report | Petrov 66'; Kasyanov (red card) 90+3' | Stadium: Teddy Stadium; Attendance: 18,000; Referee: Radek Příhoda (Czech Republic) |

| 16 July 2015 Second Qualifying round | Charleroi (Belgium) | 5–1 | (Israel) Beitar Jerusalem | Charleroi, Belgium |
| 20:30 (UTC+3) | Pollet 10', 68'; Kebano 47', 90+3'; Stevance 88' | Report | Gabay 35'; Dasa (red card) 45+2' de Lucas (red card) 76' | Stadium: Stade du Pays de Charleroi; Attendance: 10,175; Referee: Lee Probert (England) |

| 23 July 2015 Second Qualifying round | Beitar Jerusalem (Israel) | 1–4 (2–9 agg.) | (Belgium) Charleroi | Jerusalem, Israel |
| 20:00 (UTC+3) | Atzili 16' | Report | Sağlık 53'; Kebano 43'; Ndongala 76'; Stevance 90+2' | Stadium: Teddy Stadium; Attendance: 6,500; Referee: Stephan Klossner (Switzerland) |

== Squad statistics ==
As of match played 28 September 2015

=== Appearances and goals ===
| No. | Pos | Nat | Player | Total | | Ligat Ha'Al | | State Cup | | Toto Cup | | UEFA Europa League | |
| No. | Pos | Nat | Player | Apps | Goals | Apps | Goals | Apps | Goals | Apps | Goals | Apps | Goals |
|---|---|---|---|---|---|---|---|---|---|---|---|---|---|
| 1 | GK | (Israel) ISR | Boris Klaiman | 13 | 0 | 5 | 0 | 0 | 0 | 4 | 0 | 4 | 0 |
| 2 | DF | (Israel) ISR | Eli Dasa | 3 | 0 | 0 | 0 | 0 | 0 | 1 | 0 | 2 | 0 |
| 3 | DF | (Israel) ISR | David Keltjens | 3 | 0 | 0 | 0 | 0 | 0 | 2+1 | 0 | 0 | 0 |
| 4 | DF | (Spain) ESP | Jesús Rueda | 2 | 1 | 2 | 1 | 0 | 0 | 0 | 0 | 0 | 0 |
| 5 | DF | (Israel) ISR | Nisso Kapiloto | 8 | 0 | 4 | 0 | 0 | 0 | 3 | 0 | 1 | 0 |
| 6 | DF | (Israel) ISR | Tal Kachila | 9 | 0 | 4 | 0 | 0 | 0 | 1 | 0 | 4 | 0 |
| 7 | MF | (Israel) ISR | Omer Atzili | 13 | 3 | 5 | 1 | 0 | 0 | 4 | 0 | 4 | 2 |
| 9 | FW | (Israel) ISR | Itzik Cohen | 10 | 1 | 0+4 | 0 | 0 | 0 | 1+3 | 1 | 0+2 | 0 |
| 10 | MF | (Israel) ISR | Dani Preda | 7 | 0 | 0+1 | 0 | 0 | 0 | 0+3 | 0 | 3 | 0 |
| 12 | FW | (Israel) ISR | Avishay Cohen | 8 | 0 | 2+1 | 0 | 0 | 0 | 2+2 | 0 | 1 | 0 |
| 13 | FW | (Australia) AUS | Nikita Rukavytsya | 2 | 1 | 1+1 | 1 | 0 | 0 | 0 | 0 | 0 | 0 |
| 14 | MF | (Brazil) BRA | Claudemir | 13 | 0 | 5 | 0 | 0 | 0 | 4 | 0 | 4 | 0 |
| 15 | MF | (Israel) ISR | Ness Zamir | 10 | 1 | 1+2 | 0 | 0 | 0 | 2+2 | 1 | 0+3 | 0 |
| 16 | FW | (Israel) ISR | Dovev Gabay | 13 | 2 | 5 | 0 | 0 | 0 | 3+1 | 0 | 4 | 2 |
| 17 | MF | (Israel) ISR | Lidor Cohen | 13 | 0 | 3+2 | 0 | 0 | 0 | 3+1 | 0 | 1+3 | 0 |
| 18 | MF | (Israel) ISR | Liroy Zhairi | 11 | 1 | 2+2 | 1 | 0 | 0 | 2+1 | 0 | 4 | 0 |
| 20 | FW | (Israel) ISR | Omer Nachmani | 4 | 0 | 1 | 0 | 0 | 0 | 0 | 0 | 2+1 | 0 |
| 23 | DF | (Israel) ISR | Tomer Yerucham | 5 | 0 | 2 | 0 | 0 | 0 | 0+1 | 0 | 1+1 | 0 |
| 26 | DF | (Israel) ISR | Elad Gabai | 1 | 0 | 1 | 0 | 0 | 0 | 0 | 0 | 0 | 0 |
| 28 | DF | (Israel) ISR | Snir Mishan | 5 | 0 | 2 | 0 | 0 | 0 | 3 | 0 | 0 | 0 |
| 77 | DF | (Israel) ISR | Uri Magbo | 7 | 0 | 0+1 | 0 | 0 | 0 | 1+2 | 0 | 2+1 | 0 |
| 81 | DF | (Serbia) SRB | Dušan Matović | 12 | 0 | 5 | 0 | 0 | 0 | 3 | 0 | 4 | 0 |
| 90 | DF | (Sweden) SWE | Joakim Askling | 3 | 0 | 0 | 0 | 0 | 0 | 0 | 0 | 3 | 0 |
| 91 | MF | (Spain) ESP | Pablo de Lucas | 8 | 0 | 5 | 0 | 0 | 0 | 2 | 0 | 0+1 | 0 |
Players away from Beitar Jerusalem on loan:
Players who appeared for Beitar Jerusalem that left during the season:
| 8 | MF | (Israel) ISR | Shlomi Azulay | 0 | 1 | 0 | 0 | 0 | 0 | 0 | 1 | 0 | 0 |
| | MF | (Spain) ESP | Fran González | 2 | 0 | 0 | 0 | 0 | 0 | 2 | 0 | 0 | 0 |

=== Goal scorers ===
| Place | Position | Nation | Number | Name | Ligat Ha'Al | State Cup | Toto Cup | UEFA Europa League | Total |
|---|---|---|---|---|---|---|---|---|---|
| 1 | MF | (Israel) | 7 | Omer Atzili | 1 | 0 | 0 | 2 | 3 |
| 2 | FW | (Israel) | 16 | Dovev Gabay | 0 | 0 | 0 | 2 | 2 |
| 3 | MF | (Israel) | 17 | Lidor Cohen | 1 | 0 | 0 | 0 | 1 |
| 3 | FW | (Israel) | 13 | Nikita Rukavytsya | 1 | 0 | 0 | 0 | 1 |
| 3 | DF | (Spain) | 4 | Jesús Rueda | 1 | 0 | 0 | 0 | 1 |
| 3 | MF | (Israel) | 18 | Liroy Zhairi | 1 | 0 | 0 | 0 | 1 |
| 3 | FW | (Israel) | 9 | Itzik Cohen | 0 | 0 | 1 | 0 | 1 |
| 3 | MF | (Israel) | 15 | Ness Zamir | 0 | 0 | 1 | 0 | 1 |
| | | | | TOTALS | 5 | 0 | 2 | 4 | 11 |

=== Disciplinary record ===
| Number | Nation | Position | Name | Ligat Ha'Al | | State Cup | | Toto Cup | | Europa League | | Total | |
| Number | Nation | Position | Name | Yellow card | Red card | Yellow card | Red card | Yellow card | Red card | Yellow card | Red card | Yellow card | Red card |
| 1 | (Israel) | GK | Boris Klaiman | 0 | 0 | 0 | 0 | 0 | 0 | 1 | 0 | 1 | 0 |
| 2 | (Israel) | DF | Eli Dasa | 0 | 0 | 0 | 0 | 0 | 0 | 1 | 1 | 1 | 1 |
| 6 | (Israel) | DF | Tal Kachila | 1 | 0 | 0 | 0 | 0 | 0 | 0 | 0 | 1 | 0 |
| 7 | (Israel) | MF | Omer Atzili | 1 | 0 | 0 | 0 | 1 | 0 | 1 | 0 | 3 | 0 |
| 9 | (Israel) | FW | Itzik Cohen | 1 | 0 | 0 | 0 | 0 | 0 | 0 | 0 | 1 | 0 |
| 10 | (Israel) | MF | Dani Preda | 0 | 0 | 0 | 0 | 0 | 0 | 2 | 0 | 2 | 0 |
| 12 | (Israel) | FW | Avishay Cohen | 1 | 0 | 0 | 0 | 0 | 1 | 0 | 0 | 2 | 0 |
| 15 | (Israel) | MF | Ness Zamir | 0 | 0 | 0 | 0 | 0 | 0 | 1 | 0 | 1 | 0 |
| 16 | (Israel) | FW | Dovev Gabay | 1 | 0 | 0 | 0 | 0 | 0 | 1 | 0 | 2 | 0 |
| 17 | (Israel) | MF | Lidor Cohen | 0 | 0 | 0 | 0 | 1 | 0 | 1 | 0 | 2 | 0 |
| 18 | (Israel) | MF | Liroy Zhairi | 1 | 0 | 0 | 0 | 2 | 0 | 2 | 0 | 5 | 0 |
| 20 | (Israel) | FW | Omer Nachmani | 0 | 0 | 0 | 0 | 0 | 0 | 2 | 0 | 2 | 0 |
| 23 | (Israel) | DF | Tomer Yerucham | 2 | 0 | 0 | 0 | 1 | 0 | 0 | 0 | 3 | 0 |
| 26 | (Israel) | DF | Elad Gabai | 1 | 0 | 0 | 0 | 0 | 0 | 0 | 0 | 1 | 0 |
| 28 | (Israel) | DF | Snir Mishan | 1 | 0 | 0 | 0 | 0 | 0 | 0 | 0 | 1 | 0 |
| 55 | (Israel) | DF | Nisso Kapiloto | 0 | 0 | 0 | 0 | 0 | 0 | 1 | 0 | 1 | 0 |
| 81 | (Serbia) | DF | Dušan Matović | 0 | 0 | 0 | 0 | 3 | 0 | 0 | 0 | 3 | 0 |
| 90 | (Israel) | DF | Daniel Askling | 0 | 0 | 0 | 0 | 0 | 0 | 1 | 0 | 1 | 0 |
| 91 | (Spain) | MF | Pablo de Lucas | 0 | 0 | 0 | 0 | 0 | 0 | 0 | 1 | 0 | 1 |
| | | | TOTALS | 10 | 0 | 0 | 0 | 8 | 0 | 14 | 2 | 32 | 2 |
