= 2013–14 Beitar Jerusalem F.C. season =

Beitar Jerusalem
2013–14 season
- Chairman: Eli Tabib
- Manager: Ronny Levy
- Ligat Ha'Al: 7th
- State Cup: Quarter-finals
- Top goalscorer: League: Itzik Cohen (7); All: Itzik Cohen (7)
- Highest home attendance: 30,300 (rd. 6 vs Hapoel Tel Aviv)
- Lowest home attendance: 600 (rd. 32 vs Hapoel Ironi Acre)
| Home colours | Away colours |

The 2013–14 season is Beitar Jerusalem's 45th season in the Israeli Premier League.

== Season overview ==
In May 2013, Eli Tabib negotiated with owner Arcadi Gaydamak with the target of purchasing Beitar Jerusalem. Gaydamak tried to find other investors in Russia whilst the negotiations with Tabib were ongoing.

On 4 June 2013, Eli Tabib purchased 75% of Beitar and the fan's group, "Amutat Ohadi Beitar", acquired 25% of the club. Elsewhere Gaydamak announced that he had achieved in finding a team of investors that was being represented by businessman, Tamirlan Majidov.

The fans began to claim that Majidov was actually working for Gaydamak and started to protest outside Gaydamak's house and announced that they wouldn't buy tickets or season tickets.

On 18 June 2013 Majidov notified that he had not bought Beitar, and Tabib officially became Beitar Jerusalem's chairman.

Soon after, Tabib signed Eli Cohen as the manager of the team, and extended David Amsalem's contract as the assistant manager.

On 3 December, after 3 consecutive losses in the league, Eli Tabib sacked Eli Cohen and David Amsalem became the caretaker manager.

On 9 December, Ronny Levy was appointed as the team's manager until the end of the season.

== First team ==
Note: Flags indicate national team as defined under FIFA eligibility rules; some limited exceptions apply. Players may hold more than one non-FIFA nationality.

| No. | Pos. | Nation | Player |
|---|---|---|---|
| 1 | GK | ISR | Ariel Harush (Captain) |
| 2 | DF | ISR | Eli Dasa |
| 4 | MF | ESP | Jonathan Vila (on loan from Celta Vigo) |
| 6 | DF | ISR | Tal Kachila |
| 7 | MF | ISR | Omer Atzili |
| 8 | MF | ISR | Aviram Baruchyan |
| 9 | FW | ISR | Itzik Cohen |
| 10 | FW | ISR | Shlomi Azulay (on loan from Maccabi Haifa) |
| 11 | MF | ISR | Sintayehu Sallalich (on loan from Maccabi Haifa) |
| 14 | MF | ISR | Dani Preda |
| 15 | DF | ISR | Shai Haddad |

| No. | Pos. | Nation | Player |
|---|---|---|---|
| 16 | MF | ISR | Moshe Lugasi (on loan from Maccabi Tel Aviv) |
| 17 | MF | ISR | Tzahi Elihen |
| 18 | GK | ISR | Ohad Saidof |
| 19 | MF | ISR | Roei Zikri |
| 20 | FW | BRA | Bryan |
| 24 | MF | ISR | Ofir Kriaf |
| 25 | MF | ARG | Pablo Brandán |
| 26 | MF | ISR | Dor Malul |
| 28 | MF | ISR | Barak Moshe |
| 55 | DF | ISR | Nisso Kapiloto |
| 81 | DF | SRB | Dušan Matović |

=== Summer transfers ===
Players In
| Name | Nat | Pos | Moving from |
|---|---|---|---|
| Andrés Túñez | (Venezuela) | DF | (Spain) Celta de Vigo (loan) |
| Nisso Kapiloto | (Israel) | DF | (Cyprus) Alki Larnaca |
| Netanel Ben Simon | (Israel) | DF | (Israel) Ahi Nazareth (loan return) |
| Tomer Yerucham | (Israel) | DF | (Israel) Hapoel Rishon LeZion (loan return) |
| Landry Mulemo | (Democratic Republic of the Congo) | DF | (Belgium) KV Kortrijk |
| David Revivo | (Israel) | MF | (Israel) FC Ashdod |
| Osa Guobadia | (Nigeria) | MF | (North Macedonia) FK Vardar |
| Omer Atzili | (Israel) | MF | (Israel) Hapoel Rishon LeZion |
| Roei Zikri | (Israel) | MF | (Israel) Hapoel Petah Tikva |
| Aviram Baruchyan | (Israel) | MF | (Israel) Hapoel Be'er Sheva |
| Dor Malul | (Israel) | MF | (Belgium) Beerschot |
| Sintayehu Sallalich | (Israel) | MF | (Israel) Maccabi Haifa (loan) |
| Itzik Cohen | (Israel) | FW | (Israel) Hapoel Jerusalem |
| Teteh Bangura | (Sierra Leone) | FW | (Turkey) Bursaspor |
| Bryan | (Brazil) | FW | (Brazil) Tupi |

Players Out
| Name | Nat | Pos | Moving to |
|---|---|---|---|
| Dino Škvorc | (Croatia) | DF | (Cyprus) Nea Salamis |
| Dzhabrail Kadiyev | (Russia) | DF | (Russia) Terek Grozny |
| Avi Reikan | (Israel) | MF | (Switzerland) FC Zürich |
| Kobi Moyal | (Israel) | MF | (Moldova) Sheriff Tiraspol |
| Darío Fernández | (Argentina) | MF | (Israel) Hapoel Haifa |
| Dominik Glavina | (Croatia) | MF | (Croatia) Slaven Belupo |
| Amit Ben Shushan | (Israel) | FW | (Cyprus) Anorthosis |
| Eran Levy | (Israel) | FW | (Israel) Maccabi Netanya |
| Zaur Sadayev | (Russia) | FW | (Russia) Terek Grozny |
| Omer Nachmani | (Israel) | FW | (Israel) Maccabi Herzliya (loan) |
| Harel Polak | (Israel) | FW | (Israel) Beitar Nahariya (loan) |
| Tal Mishali | (Israel) | FW | (Israel) Maccabi Umm al-Fahm (loan) |

=== Winter transfers ===
Players In
| Name | Nat | Pos | Moving from |
|---|---|---|---|
| Jonathan Vila | (Spain) | MF | (Spain) Celta de Vigo (loan) |
| Moshe Lugasi | (Israel) | MF | (Israel) Maccabi Tel Aviv (loan) |
| Shlomi Azulay | (Israel) | FW | (Israel) Maccabi Haifa (loan) |
| Pablo Brandán | (Argentina) | MF | (China) Liaoning Whowin |
| Dušan Matović | (Serbia) | DF | (Israel) Ironi Kiryat Shmona |
| Dani Preda | (Israel) | MF | (Israel) Maccabi Petah Tikva |

Players Out
| Name | Nat | Pos | Moving to |
|---|---|---|---|
| Matan Barashi | (Israel) | DF | (Israel) Hapoel Katamon Jerusalem |
| Osa Guobadia | (Nigeria) | MF | Free agent |
| Teteh Bangura | (Sierra Leone) | FW | (Turkey) Bursaspor (loan terminated) |
| Netanel Ben Simon | (Israel) | DF | (Israel) Hapoel Jerusalem |
| Landry Mulemo | (Democratic Republic of the Congo) | DF | Free agent |
| Eden Nachmani | (Israel) | FW | (Israel) Sektzia Nes Tziona (loan) |
| David Revivo | (Israel) | MF | Hapoel Haifa |
| Evyatar Baruchyan | (Israel) | MF | (Israel) Hapoel Katamon Jerusalem |
| Tomer Yerucham | (Israel) | DF | (Israel) Maccabi Yavne (loan) |
| Andrés Túñez | (Venezuela) | DF | (Thailand) Buriram United |

== Ligat Ha'Al (Premier League) ==
=== Fixtures ===
| 24 August 2013 1 | Beitar Jerusalem | 0–2 | Hapoel Be'er Sheva | Ramat Gan |
| Saturday 20:15 IDT | | Summary; Report (Hebrew) | Nassar 19'; Swisa 90+1' | Stadium: Ramat Gan Stadium; Attendance: 10,840; Referee: Eli Hachmon |

| 31 August 2013 2 | Maccabi Petah Tikva | 1–3 | Beitar Jerusalem | Petah Tikva |
| Saturday 20:15 IDT | Golan 1'; Đukić (yellow card) 24' (red card) 90+2' | Summary; Report (Hebrew) | Haddad 20' (pen.); I. Cohen 50'; Elihen 88' | Stadium: HaMoshava Stadium; Attendance: 5,700; Referee: Daniel Bar-Natan |

| 21 September 2013 3 | Beitar Jerusalem | 0–1 | Hapoel Haifa | Petah Tikva |
| Saturday 20:15 IDT | | Summary; Report (Hebrew) | Kijanskas 24' | Stadium: HaMoshava Stadium; Attendance: 8,000; Referee: Menashe Mashiah |

| 29 September 2013 4 | Hapoel Ra'anana | 2–2 | Beitar Jerusalem | Netanya |
| Sunday 20:10 IDT | T. Cohen 14'; Baldout 53' | Summary; Report (Hebrew) | I. Cohen 5'; Bangura 29' (red card) 80' | Stadium: Netanya Stadium; Attendance: 3,800; Referee: Eitan Shmuelevich |

| 5 October 2013 5 | Hapoel Ramat HaSharon | 0–2 | Beitar Jerusalem | Ramat HaSharon |
| Saturday 20:00 IDT | | Summary; Report (Hebrew) | Haddad 9'; Sallalich 64' | Stadium: Grundman Stadium; Attendance: 1,200; Referee: Erez Papier |

| 21 October 2013 6 | Beitar Jerusalem | 1–0 | Hapoel Tel Aviv | Jerusalem |
| Monday 21:00 IDT | Kapiloto 84' | Summary; Report (Hebrew) | | Stadium: Teddy Stadium; Attendance: 30,300; Referee: Liran Liany |

| 26 October 2013 7 | Hapoel Ironi Acre | 0–0 | Beitar Jerusalem | Acre |
| Saturday 20:45 IDT | | Summary; Report (Hebrew) | | Stadium: Acre Municipal Stadium; Attendance: 5,000; Referee: Roi Reinshreiber |

| 2 November 2013 8 | Beitar Jerusalem | 2–1 | Bnei Yehuda | Jerusalem |
| Saturday 19:30 IST | Bangura 49', 65' | Summary; Report (Hebrew) | Hrepka 32' (red card) 75' | Stadium: Teddy Stadium; Attendance: 9,000; Referee: Ziv Adler |

| 11 November 2013 9 | Maccabi Haifa | 2–0 | Beitar Jerusalem | Haifa |
| Monday 21:00 IST | Turgeman 12'; Ezra 79' | Summary; Report (Hebrew) | | Stadium: Kiryat Eliezer Stadium; Attendance: 12,000; Referee: Orel Greenfeld |

| 23 November 2013 10 | Beitar Jerusalem | 1–4 | Ironi Kiryat Shmona | Jerusalem |
| Saturday 19:30 IST | Sallalich 64' | Summary; Report (Hebrew) | Kahlon 17', 43' (pen.); Dasa 29' (o.g.); Panka 75' | Stadium: Teddy Stadium; Attendance: 7,000; Referee: Menashe Mashiah |

| 30 November 2013 11 | F.C. Ashdod | 1–0 | Beitar Jerusalem | Ashdod |
| Saturday 20:00 IST | Bello 3' | Summary; Report (Hebrew) | | Stadium: Yud-Alef Stadium; Attendance: 4,500; Referee: Liran Wachsberger |

| 8 December 2013 12 | Beitar Jerusalem | 1–2 | Maccabi Tel Aviv | Jerusalem |
| Sunday 20:50 IST | Bryan 83' | Summary; Report (Hebrew) | Prica 2'; Yitzhaki 40' | Stadium: Teddy Stadium; Attendance: 20,000; Referee: Erez Papier |

| 17 December 2013; Postponed due to weather 13 | Bnei Sakhnin | 0–0 | Beitar Jerusalem | Sakhnin |
| Tuesday 19:30 IST | | Summary; Report (Hebrew) | | Stadium: Doha Stadium; Attendance: 6,000; Referee: Menashe Mashiah |

| 23 December 2013 14 | Hapoel Be'er Sheva | 2–0 | Beitar Jerusalem | Be'er Sheva |
| Monday 20:50 IST | Plet 43'; Buzaglo 80' | Summary; Report (Hebrew) | Bryan (red card) 52' | Stadium: Vasermil Stadium; Attendance: 8,000; Referee: Roi Reinshreiber |

| 29 December 2013 15 | Beitar Jerusalem | 1–0 | Maccabi Petah Tikva | Jerusalem |
| Sunday 20:20 IST | I. Cohen 69' | Summary; Report (Hebrew) | | Stadium: Teddy Stadium; Attendance: 4,500; Referee: Alon Yefet |

| 5 January 2014 16 | Hapoel Haifa | 2–2 | Beitar Jerusalem | Haifa |
| Sunday 19:45 IST | Korać 8'; Kijanskas 61' | Summary; Report (Hebrew) | Roash 44' (o.g.); I. Cohen 82' | Stadium: Kiryat Eliezer Stadium; Attendance: 6,000; Referee: Liran Liany |

| 11 January 2014 17 | Beitar Jerusalem | 1–1 | Hapoel Ra'anana | Jerusalem |
| Saturday 19:30 IST | Baruchyan 2' | Summary; Report (Hebrew) | Malka 89' | Stadium: Teddy Stadium; Attendance: 6,000; Referee: Orel Greenfeld |

| 19 January 2014 18 | Beitar Jerusalem | 0–1 | Hapoel Ramat HaSharon | Jerusalem |
| Sunday 20:15 IST | | Summary; Report (Hebrew) | Sayef 73' | Stadium: Teddy Stadium; Attendance: 6,000; Referee: Shai Shitrit |

| 26 January 2014 19 | Hapoel Tel Aviv | 3–1 | Beitar Jerusalem | Netanya |
| Sunday 20:50 IST | Abdurahimi 7'; Damari 42' (pen.); Shechter 60' | Summary; Report (Hebrew) | Bryan 79' | Stadium: Netanya Stadium; Attendance: 12,000; Referee: Erez Papier |

| 3 February 2014 20 | Beitar Jerusalem | 1–0 | Hapoel Ironi Acre | Jerusalem |
| Monday 19:30 IST | Baruchyan 37' (pen.) | Summary; Report (Hebrew) | | Stadium: Teddy Stadium; Attendance: 5,000; Referee: Menashe Mashiah |

| 8 February 2014 21 | Bnei Yehuda | 0–0 | Beitar Jerusalem | Tel Aviv |
| Saturday 19:30 IST | | Summary; Report (Hebrew) | | Stadium: Bloomfield Stadium; Attendance: 9,000; Referee: Eitan Shmuelevich |

| 16 February 2014 22 | Beitar Jerusalem | 1–0 | Maccabi Haifa | Jerusalem |
| Sunday 20:15 IST | Baruchyan 65' (pen.) | Summary; Report (Hebrew) | | Stadium: Teddy Stadium; Attendance: 12,000; Referee: Roi Reinshreiber |

| 22 February 2014 23 | Ironi Kiryat Shmona | 1–0 | Beitar Jerusalem | Kiryat Shmona |
| Saturday 19:30 IST | Manga 67' | Summary; Report (Hebrew) | | Stadium: Kiryat Shmona Municipal Stadium; Attendance: 4,000; Referee: Daniel Bar-Natan |

| 1 March 2014 24 | Beitar Jerusalem | 2–0 | F.C. Ashdod | Jerusalem |
| Saturday 20:00 IST | Brandán 2'; Kapiloto 28' | Summary; Report (Hebrew) | Davidov (yellow card) 89' (red card) 90' | Stadium: Teddy Stadium; Attendance: 5,000; Referee: Alon Yefet |

| 10 March 2014 25 | Maccabi Tel Aviv | 1–0 | Beitar Jerusalem | Netanya |
| Monday 20:50 IST | Prica 73' | Summary; Report (Hebrew) | | Stadium: Netanya Stadium; Attendance: 11,658; Referee: Orel Greenfeld |

| 15 March 2014 26 | Beitar Jerusalem | 0–1 | Bnei Sakhnin | Jerusalem |
| Saturday 19:30 IST | Túñez (red card) 72' | Summary; Report (Hebrew) | Paz 83' | Stadium: Teddy Stadium; Attendance: 5,000; Referee: Ziv Adler |

1. Beitar Jerusalem hosted their first two home matches of the season outside Jerusalem due to the damage caused to Teddy Stadium during the Maccabiah in the summer.
2. Hapoel Tel Aviv will host round 19 away from home as punishment for their fans' unruliness in the Tel Aviv derby in round 13.
3. Maccabi Tel Aviv will host round 25 away from home as punishment for their fans' unruliness in their State Cup match against F.C. Ashdod.

==== League table ====
| Pos | Team | Pld | W | D | L | GF | GA | GD | Pts | Qualification |
|---|---|---|---|---|---|---|---|---|---|---|
| 7 | F.C. Ironi Ashdod | 26 | 8 | 7 | 11 | 28 | 35 | −7 | 31 | Qualification for the relegation round |
| 8 | Hapoel Haifa | 26 | 8 | 7 | 11 | 27 | 34 | −7 | 31 | Qualification for the relegation round |
| 9 | Beitar Jerusalem | 26 | 8 | 6 | 12 | 21 | 28 | −7 | 30 | Qualification for the relegation round |
| 10 | Hapoel Acre | 26 | 6 | 9 | 11 | 24 | 37 | −13 | 27 | Qualification for the relegation round |
| 11 | Hapoel Ra'anana | 26 | 6 | 8 | 12 | 20 | 33 | −13 | 26 | Qualification for the relegation round |

Source: Israel Football Association
Rules for classification: 1st points; 2nd goal difference; 3rd matches won; 4th goals scored; 5th head-to-head; 6th decision match. Winners of 2013–14 Israel State Cup qualify for the second qualifying round of the UEFA Europa League.

==== Results summary ====
| Overall | | | | | | | | Home | | | | | | Away | | | | | |
| Pld | W | D | L | GF | GA | GD | Pts | W | D | L | GF | GA | GD | W | D | L | GF | GA | GD |
|---|---|---|---|---|---|---|---|---|---|---|---|---|---|---|---|---|---|---|---|
| 26 | 8 | 6 | 12 | 21 | 28 | −7 | 30 | 6 | 1 | 6 | 11 | 13 | −2 | 2 | 5 | 6 | 10 | 15 | −5 |

Last updated: 16 March 2014.
Source: Competitive matches

=== Bottom playoff ===
| 30 March 2014 27 | Beitar Jerusalem | 3–0 | Maccabi Petah Tikva | Jerusalem |
| Sunday 20:15 IDT | I. Cohen 47'; Baruchyan 62' (pen.); Atzili 87' | Summary; Report (Hebrew) | | Stadium: Teddy Stadium; Attendance: 1,500; Referee: Daniel Bar-Natan |

| 6 April 2014 28 | Bnei Yehuda | 1–0 | Beitar Jerusalem | Tel Aviv |
| Sunday 20:15 IDT | Kadusi 56' | Summary; Report (Hebrew) | | Stadium: Bloomfield Stadium; Attendance: 5,000; Referee: Roi Reinshreiber |

| 13 April 2014 29 | Beitar Jerusalem | 1–0 | F.C. Ashdod | Jerusalem |
| Sunday 20:15 IDT | Azulay 78' | Summary; Report (Hebrew) | | Stadium: Teddy Stadium; Attendance: 1,000; Referee: Tzvika Levi |

| 21 April 2014 30 | Hapoel Haifa | 1–0 | Beitar Jerusalem | Haifa |
| Monday 20:00 IDT | Avidor 30' | Summary; Report (Hebrew) | Baruchyan (red card) 11' | Stadium: Kiryat Eliezer Stadium; Attendance: 1,500; Referee: Daniel Bar-Natan |

| 26 April 2014 31 | Beitar Jerusalem | 4–0 | Hapoel Ramat HaSharon | Jerusalem |
| Saturday 17:00 IDT | Azulay 25'; I. Cohen 80', 84'; Bryan 82' | Summary; Report (Hebrew) | | Stadium: Teddy Stadium; Attendance: 1,200; Referee: Menashe Mashiah |

| 3 May 2014 32 | Beitar Jerusalem | 0–2 | Hapoel Ironi Acre | Jerusalem |
| Saturday 18:30 IDT | | Summary; Report (Hebrew) | Salihi 30' (pen.); Shabtay 83' | Stadium: Teddy Stadium; Attendance: 600; Referee: Gal Leibowitz |

| 10 May 2014 33 | Hapoel Ra'anana | 0–2 | Beitar Jerusalem | Netanya |
| Saturday 20:00 IDT | | Summary; Report (Hebrew) | Lerman 72' (o.g.); Azulay 88' (pen.) | Stadium: Netanya Stadium; Attendance: 400; Referee: Na'el Uda |

==== Table ====
| Pos | Team | Pld | W | D | L | GF | GA | GD | Pts | Relegation |
|---|---|---|---|---|---|---|---|---|---|---|
| 7 | Beitar Jerusalem | 33 | 12 | 6 | 15 | 31 | 32 | −1 | 42 | |
| 8 | F.C. Ironi Ashdod | 33 | 10 | 9 | 14 | 35 | 45 | −10 | 39 | |
| 9 | Hapoel Ra'anana | 33 | 9 | 11 | 13 | 31 | 40 | −9 | 38 | |
| 10 | Hapoel Acre | 33 | 8 | 12 | 13 | 30 | 42 | −12 | 36 | |
| 11 | Hapoel Haifa | 33 | 9 | 7 | 17 | 30 | 45 | −15 | 34 | |
| 12 | Maccabi Petah Tikva | 33 | 8 | 9 | 16 | 39 | 57 | −18 | 33 | |
| 13 | Hapoel Ramat HaSharon (R) | 33 | 9 | 6 | 18 | 29 | 59 | −30 | 33 | Relegation to Liga Leumit |
| 14 | Bnei Yehuda (R) | 33 | 7 | 10 | 16 | 32 | 45 | −13 | 31 | Relegation to Liga Leumit |

Source: Israel Football Association
Rules for classification: 1st points; 2nd goal difference; 3rd matches won; 4th goals scored; 5th head-to-head; 6th decision match
(R) Relegated

==== Results summary ====
| Overall | | | | | | | | Home | | | | | | Away | | | | | |
| Pld | W | D | L | GF | GA | GD | Pts | W | D | L | GF | GA | GD | W | D | L | GF | GA | GD |
|---|---|---|---|---|---|---|---|---|---|---|---|---|---|---|---|---|---|---|---|
| 33 | 12 | 6 | 15 | 31 | 32 | −1 | 42 | 9 | 1 | 7 | 19 | 15 | +4 | 3 | 5 | 8 | 12 | 17 | −5 |

Last updated: 11 May 2014.
Source: Competitive matches

=== Results by round ===
| Round | 1 | 2 | 3 | 4 | 5 | 6 | 7 | 8 | 9 | 10 | 11 | 12 | 13 | 14 | 15 | 16 | 17 | 18 | 19 | 20 | 21 | 22 | 23 | 24 | 25 | 26 | 27 | 28 | 29 | 30 | 31 | 32 | 33 |
|---|---|---|---|---|---|---|---|---|---|---|---|---|---|---|---|---|---|---|---|---|---|---|---|---|---|---|---|---|---|---|---|---|---|
| Ground | H | A | H | A | A | H | A | H | A | H | A | H | A | A | H | A | H | H | A | H | A | H | A | H | A | H | H | A | H | A | H | H | A |
| Result | L | W | L | D | W | W | D | W | L | L | L | L | D | L | W | D | D | L | L | W | D | W | L | W | L | L | W | L | W | L | W | L | W |
| Position | 12 | 8 | 8 | 9 | 7 | 4 | 6 | 5 | 6 | 9 | 10 | 11 | 11 | 11 | 10 | 9 | 9 | 9 | 10 | 9 | 9 | 8 | 9 | 9 | 8 | 9 | 7 | 8 | 7 | 8 | 7 | 7 | 7 |

Updated to match(es) played on 11 May 2014. Source: Competitive matches
A = Away; H = Home; W = Win; D = Draw; L = Loss

=== League goalscorers per round ===
| Total | Player | | Goals per Round | | | | | | | | | | | | | | | | | | | | | | | | | | | | | | | | |
| Total | Player | | 1 | 2 | 3 | 4 | 5 | 6 | 7 | 8 | 9 | 10 | 11 | 12 | 13 | 14 | 15 | 16 | 17 | 18 | 19 | 20 | 21 | 22 | 23 | 24 | 25 | 26 | 27 | 28 | 29 | 30 | 31 | 32 | 33 |
|---|---|---|---|---|---|---|---|---|---|---|---|---|---|---|---|---|---|---|---|---|---|---|---|---|---|---|---|---|---|---|---|---|---|---|---|
| 7 | (Israel) | Itzik Cohen | | 1 | | 1 | | | | | | | | | | | 1 | 1 | | | | | | | | | | | 1 | | | | 2 | | |
| 4 | (Israel) | Aviram Baruchyan | | | | | | | | | | | | | | | | | 1 | | | 1 | | 1 | | | | | 1 | | | | | | |
| 3 | (Sierra Leone) | Ibrahim Bangura | | | | 1 | | | | 2 | | | | | | | | | | | | | | | | | | | | | | | | | |
| 3 | (Brazil) | Bryan Jones Anicézio | | | | | | | | | | | | 1 | | | | | | | 1 | | | | | | | | | | | | 1 | | |
| 3 | (Israel) | Shlomi Azulay | | | | | | | | | | | | | | | | | | | | | | | | | | | | | 1 | | 1 | | 1 |
| 2 | (Israel) | Shai Haddad | | 1 | | | 1 | | | | | | | | | | | | | | | | | | | | | | | | | | | | |
| 2 | (Israel) | Sintayehu Sallalich | | | | | 1 | | | | | 1 | | | | | | | | | | | | | | | | | | | | | | | |
| 2 | (Israel) | Nisso Kapiloto | | | | | | 1 | | | | | | | | | | | | | | | | | | 1 | | | | | | | | | |
| 2 | – | Own goal | | | | | | | | | | | | | | | | 1 | | | | | | | | | | | | | | | | | 1 |
| 1 | (Israel) | Tzahi Elihen | | 1 | | | | | | | | | | | | | | | | | | | | | | | | | | | | | | | |
| 1 | (Argentina) | Pablo Brandán | | | | | | | | | | | | | | | | | | | | | | | | 1 | | | | | | | | | |
| 1 | (Israel) | Omer Atzili | | | | | | | | | | | | | | | | | | | | | | | | | | | 1 | | | | | | |
| 31 | TOTAL | | 0 | 3 | 0 | 2 | 2 | 1 | 0 | 2 | 0 | 1 | 0 | 1 | 0 | 0 | 1 | 2 | 1 | 0 | 1 | 1 | 0 | 1 | 0 | 2 | 0 | 0 | 3 | 0 | 1 | 0 | 4 | 0 | 2 |

== State Cup ==
=== Fixtures ===
| 29 January 2014 Round of 32 | Beitar Jerusalem | 2–0 | Maccabi Bat Yam | Jerusalem |
| Wednesday 19:00 IST | Brandán 53'; Kapiloto 67' | Summary; Report (Hebrew) | | Stadium: Teddy Stadium; Attendance: 4,000; Referee: Gal Leibowitz |

| 11 February 2014 Round of 16 | Hapoel Bnei Lod | 0–1 | Beitar Jerusalem | Lod |
| Tuesday 21:00 IST | | Summary; Report (Hebrew) | Azulay 56' | Stadium: Lod Municipal Stadium; Attendance: 3,000; Referee: Orel Greenfeld |

| 26 March 2014 Quarter-final | Ironi Kiryat Shmona | 2–0 | Beitar Jerusalem | Kiryat Shmona |
| Wednesday 19:40 IST | Kola 79'; Manga 83' | Summary; Report (Hebrew) | Kriaf (red card) 81' | Stadium: Kiryat Shmona Municipal Stadium; Attendance: 5,000; Referee: Menashe Mashiah |

=== Goalscorers ===
1 goal

- (Israel) Shlomi Azulay
- (Argentina) Pablo Brandán
- (Israel) Nisso Kapiloto
