= Hapoel Be'er Sheva F.C. in European football =

Israeli club in European football

- Club: Hapoel Be'er Sheva F.C.
- First entry: 1976 Intertoto Cup
- Latest entry: 2026–27 UEFA Europa League

This is the list of all Hapoel Be'er Sheva F.C.'s European matches.

== History ==
Hapoel Be'er Sheva's European history began with the 1976 Intertoto Cup. They won their first match against Danish club Køge BK. Hapoel Be'er Sheva qualified three times to the Europa League group stage in seasons 2016–17, 2017–18 and 2020–21.

== Overall record ==
As of 18 August 2025

Competition	G	W	D	L	GF	GA
UEFA Conference League	28	10	12	6	38	24
UEFA Champions League	16	9	3	4	27	24
UEFA Cup / UEFA Europa League	46	14	11	21	49	72
UEFA Cup Winners' Cup	4	1	1	2	3	15
UEFA Intertoto Cup	12	4	4	4	19	22
TOTAL	106	38	31	37	136	157

== Results ==
Season	Competition	Round	Club	Home	Away	Aggregate
1976	Intertoto Cup	Group stage	(Germany) Hertha BSC	3–3	1–5	3rd
1976	Intertoto Cup	Group stage	(Belgium) Standard Liège	0–0	1–3	3rd
1976	Intertoto Cup	Group stage	(Denmark) Køge BK	2–1	1–1	3rd
1994–95	Intertoto Cup	Group stage	(Switzerland) Young Boys	—N/a	1–0	2nd
1994–95	Intertoto Cup	Group stage	(Romania) Extensiv Craiova	1–3	—N/a	2nd
1994–95	Intertoto Cup	Group stage	(Germany) Karlsruhe	1–1	—N/a	2nd
1994–95	Intertoto Cup	Group stage	(Sweden) Häcken	—N/a	6–1	2nd
1994–95	UEFA Cup	P	(Greece) Aris Thessaloniki	1–2	1–3	2–5
1995–96	UEFA Cup	P	(Albania) SK Tirana	2–0	1–0	3–0
1995–96	UEFA Cup	R1	(Spain) Barcelona	0–7	0–5	0–12
1997–98	Cup Winners' Cup	Q	(Lithuania) Žalgiris Vilnius	2–1	0–0	2–1
1997–98	Cup Winners' Cup	R1	(Netherlands) Roda	1–4	0–10	1–14
2004	Intertoto Cup	R1	(Albania) Vllaznia	0–3	2–1	2–4
2014–15	Europa League	Q2	(Croatia) RNK Split	0–0	1–2	1–2
2015–16	Europa League	Q2	(Switzerland) Thun	1–1	1–2	2–3
2016–17	Champions League	Q2	(Moldova) Sheriff Tiraspol	3–2	0–0	3–2
2016–17	Champions League	Q3	(Greece) Olympiacos	1–0	0–0	1–0
2016–17	Champions League	PO	(Scotland) Celtic	2–0	2–5	4–5
2016–17	Europa League	Group stage	(Italy) Inter Milan	3–2	2–0	2nd
2016–17	Europa League	Group stage	(England) Southampton	0–0	1–1	2nd
2016–17	Europa League	Group stage	(Czech Republic) Sparta Prague	0–1	0–2	2nd
2016–17	Europa League	Round of 32	(Turkey) Beşiktaş	1–3	1–2	2–5
2017–18	Champions League	Q2	(Hungary) Honvéd	2–1	3–2	5–3
2017–18	Champions League	Q3	(Bulgaria) Ludogorets Razgrad	2–0	1–3	3–3 (a)
2017–18	Champions League	PO	(Slovenia) Maribor	2–1	0–1	2–2 (a)
2017–18	Europa League	Group stage	(Switzerland) FC Lugano	2–1	0–1	4th
2017–18	Europa League	Group stage	(Czech Republic) Viktoria Plzeň	0–2	1–3	4th
2017–18	Europa League	Group stage	(Romania) Steaua București	1–2	1–1	4th
2018–19	Champions League	Q1	(Estonia) Flora	3–1	4–1	7–2
2018–19	Champions League	Q2	(Croatia) Dinamo Zagreb	2–2	0–5	2–7
2018–19	Europa League	Q3	(Cyprus) APOEL	2–2	1–3	3–5
2019–20	Europa League	Q1	(Albania) Laçi	1–0	1–1	2–1
2019–20	Europa League	Q2	(Kazakhstan) Kairat	2–0	1–1	3–1
2019–20	Europa League	Q3	(Sweden) IFK Norrköping	3–1	1–1	4–2
2019–20	Europa League	PO	(Netherlands) Feyenoord	0–3	0–3	0–6
2020–21	Europa League	Q1	(Georgia (country)) Dinamo Batumi	3–0	—N/a	3–0
2020–21	Europa League	Q2	(Albania) Laçi	—N/a	2–1	2–1
2020–21	Europa League	Q3	(Scotland) Motherwell	3–0	—N/a	3–0
2020–21	Europa League	PO	(Czech Republic) Viktoria Plzeň	1–0	—N/a	1–0
2020–21	Europa League	Group Stage	(Germany) Bayer Leverkusen	2–4	1–4	3rd
2020–21	Europa League	Group Stage	(Czech Republic) Slavia Prague	3–1	0–3	3rd
2020–21	Europa League	Group Stage	(France) Nice	1–0	0–1	3rd
2021–22	Europa Conference League	Q2	(Bulgaria) Arda	4–0	2–0	6–0
2021–22	Europa Conference League	Q3	(Poland) Śląsk Wrocław	4–0	1–2	5–2
2021–22	Europa Conference League	PO	(Cyprus) Anorthosis Famagusta	0–0	1–3	1–3
2022–23	Europa Conference League	Q2	(Belarus) Dinamo Minsk	2–1	1–0	3–1
2022–23	Europa Conference League	Q3	(Switzerland) Lugano	3–1	2–0	5–1
2022–23	Europa Conference League	PO	(Romania) Universitatea Craiova	1–1	1–1	2–2 (p)
2022–23	Europa Conference League	Group Stage	(Spain) Villarreal	1–2	2–2	3rd
2022–23	Europa Conference League	Group Stage	Austria Wien	4–0	0–0	3rd
2022–23	Europa Conference League	Group Stage	(Poland) Lech Poznań	1–1	0–0	3rd
2023–24	Europa Conference League	Q2	(Lithuania) Panevėžys	1–0	1–1	2–1
2023–24	Europa Conference League	Q3	(Bulgaria) Levski Sofia	0–0	1–2	1–2
2024–25	Conference League	Q2	(Bulgaria) Cherno More	0–0	2–1	2–1
2024–25	Conference League	Q3	(Czech Republic) Mladá Boleslav	2–4	1–1	3–5
2025–26	Europa League	Q1	(Bulgaria) Levski Sofia	0–0	0–0	0–0 (p)
2025–26	Conference League	Q2	(Greece) AEK Athens	0–0	0–1	0–1
2026–27	Champions League	Q2	(Iceland) Víkingur Reykjavík	2–0	1–2	3–2
2026–27	Champions League	Q3	(Serbia) Red Star Belgrade	1–0	2–0	3–0
2026–27	Champions League	PO	(Azerbaijan) Sabah	2–1	2–5 (a.e.t.)	4–6
2026–27	Europa League	League phase	(Croatia) Dinamo Zagreb	0–0	—N/a	
2026–27	Europa League	League phase	(Netherlands) AZ	—N/a	1–2	
2026–27	Europa League	League phase	(Belgium) Union Saint-Gilloise	—N/a	0–4	
2026–27	Europa League	League phase	(Greece) OFI	Nov 5	—N/a	
2026–27	Europa League	League phase	(Turkey) Beşiktaş	—N/a	Nov 26	
2026–27	Europa League	League phase	(Italy) Juventus	Dec 10	—N/a	
2026–27	Europa League	League phase	(Spain) Celta Vigo	Jan 21	—N/a	
2026–27	Europa League	League phase	(England) AFC Bournemouth	—N/a	Jan 28	
Season	Competition	Round	Club	Home	Away	Aggregate

- Legend:
  - P = preliminary round
  - Q = qualification round
  - R = round
  - PO = Play-off round

== Hapoel Be'er Sheva in the group stages ==
=== Europa League ===
==== 2020–21 Group C ====
Pos	Team	Pld	W	D	L	GF	GA	GD	Pts	Qualification	LEV	SLP	HBS	NCE
1	(Germany) Bayer Leverkusen	6	5	0	1	21	8	+13	15	Advance to knockout phase	—	4–0	4–1	6–2
2	(Czech Republic) Slavia Prague	6	4	0	2	11	10	+1	12	Advance to knockout phase	1–0	—	3–0	3–2
3	(Israel) Hapoel Be'er Sheva	6	2	0	4	7	13	−6	6		2–4	3–1	—	1–0
4	(France) Nice	6	1	0	5	8	16	−8	3		2–3	1–3	1–0	—

Source: UEFA
Legend: Blue = home team win; Yellow = draw; Red = away team win.
Rules for classification: Group stage tiebreakers

==== 2017–18 Group G ====
Pos	Team	Pld	W	D	L	GF	GA	GD	Pts	Qualification	PLZ	FCSB	LUG	HBS
1	(Czech Republic) Viktoria Plzeň	6	4	0	2	13	8	+5	12	Advance to knockout phase	—	2–0	4–1	3–1
2	(Romania) FCSB	6	3	1	2	9	7	+2	10	Advance to knockout phase	3–0	—	1–2	1–1
3	(Switzerland) Lugano	6	3	0	3	9	11	−2	9		3–2	1–2	—	1–0
4	(Israel) Hapoel Be'er Sheva	6	1	1	4	5	10	−5	4		0–2	1–2	2–1	—

Source: UEFA
Legend: Blue = home team win; Yellow = draw; Red = away team win.
Rules for classification: Group stage tiebreakers

==== 2016–17 Group K ====
Pos	Team	Pld	W	D	L	GF	GA	GD	Pts	Qualification	SPP	HBS	SOU	INT
1	(Czech Republic) Sparta Prague	6	4	0	2	8	6	+2	12	Advance to knockout phase	—	2–0	1–0	3–1
2	(Israel) Hapoel Be'er Sheva	6	2	2	2	6	6	0	8	Advance to knockout phase	0–1	—	0–0	3–2
3	(England) Southampton	6	2	2	2	6	4	+2	8		3–0	1–1	—	2–1
4	(Italy) Internazionale	6	2	0	4	7	11	−4	6		2–1	0–2	1–0	—

Source: UEFA
Legend: Blue = home team win; Yellow = draw; Red = away team win.

=== Europa Conference League ===
==== 2022–23 Group C ====
Pos	Team	Pld	W	D	L	GF	GA	GD	Pts	Qualification	VIL	LCH	HBS	AW
1	(Spain) Villarreal	6	4	1	1	14	9	+5	13	Advance to round of 16	—	4–3	2–2	5–0
2	(Poland) Lech Poznań	6	2	3	1	12	7	+5	9	Advance to knockout round play-offs	3–0	—	0–0	4–1
3	(Israel) Hapoel Be'er Sheva	6	1	4	1	8	5	+3	7		1–2	1–1	—	4–0
4	Austria Wien	6	0	2	4	2	15	−13	2		0–1	1–1	0–0	—

Source: UEFA
Legend: Blue = home team win; Yellow = draw; Red = away team win.
Rules for classification: Group stage tiebreakers

== Hapoel Be'er Sheva in European knockout phases ==
=== Europa League ===
==== 2016–17 – Round of 32 ====
16 February 2017 Round of 32 – 1st leg	Hapoel Be'er Sheva (Israel)	1–3	(Turkey) Beşiktaş	Be'er Sheva, Israel
22:05 (IST)	Tzedek (yellow card) 5'; Barda 44'	Report	42' (o.g.) William; 60' Tosun; 90+3' Hutchinson	Stadium: Turner Stadium; Attendance: 15,347; Referee: (England) Martin Atkinson

23 February 2017 Round of 32 – 2nd leg	Beşiktaş (Turkey)	2–1 (5–2 agg.)	(Israel) Hapoel Be'er Sheva	Istanbul, Turkey
20:00 (IST)	Aboubakar 17'; Tosun 87'; Marcelo (yellow card) 89'	Report	64' Nwakaeme; (yellow card) 89' Barda	Stadium: Vodafone Park; Attendance: 27,892; Referee: (Slovenia) Matej Jug

== UEFA Team Ranking ==
- Bold row-separators indicate change of ranking system.
- Italic font indicate ongoing season.

Season	Rank	T.Points	S.Points	Ref.
2025–26	117 ▼	14.000	1.500	
2024–25	109 ▼	16.500	2.000	
2023–24	99 ▼	17.000	2.000	
2022–23	93 ▲	17.000	6.000	
2021–22	109 ▼	14.000	2.500	
2020–21	91 ▲	17.500	4.000	
2019–20	106 ▲	14.000	2.500	
2018–19	109 ▲	12.000	2.000	
2017–18	122 ▲	10.000	3.000	
2016–17	150 ▲	10.875	7.350	
2015–16	275 ▲	4.725	0.950	
2014–15	278 ▲	4.700	0.775	
