= 2014–15 Hapoel Be'er Sheva F.C. season =

Hapoel Be'er Sheva
2014–15 season
- Chairman: Alona Barkat
- Manager: Elisha Levy
- Stadium: Vasermil Stadium

Hapoel Be'er Sheva F.C. (Hebrew: מועדון הכדורגל הפועל באר שבע, Moadon HaKaduregel Hapoel Be'er Sheva) is an Israeli football club from the city of Be'er Sheva, that competes in the Israeli Premier League.

== Team Members ==
As of 18 July 2014

No.	Nat.	Player	Pos	Debut Year	Previous club
Goalkeepers
1	(Nigeria)	Austin Ejide	GK	2012	(Israel) Hapoel Petah Tikva
22	(Israel)	Robi Levkovich	GK	2014	(Israel) Maccabi Netanya
36	(Israel)	Raz Rahamim	GK	2014	(Israel) Hapoel Be'er Sheva U19
Defenders
2	(Israel)	Ben Bitton	RB	2013	(Israel) Hapoel Nazareth Illit
3	(Israel)	Joakim Daniel Askling	CB	2014	(Israel) Hapoel Kfar Saba
4	(Israel)	Dor Malul	RB	2014	(Israel) Beitar Jerusalem
13	(Israel)	Ofir Davidzada	LB	2010	(Israel) Hapoel Be'er Sheva U19
14	(Israel)	Evyatar Iluz	RB	2006	(Israel) Hapoel Petah Tikva
17	(Israel)	Ben Algrabli	CB	2013	(Israel) Hapoel Be'er Sheva U19
23	(Serbia)	Tomislav Pajović	CB	2013	(Moldova) Sheriff Tiraspol
25	(Brazil)	William Ribeiro Soares	CB/DMF	2010	(Israel) Hapoel Ramat Gan
Midfielders
7	(Israel)	Siraj Nassar	AM	2009	(Israel) Maccabi Kfar Kanna
8	(Israel)	Gal Harel	DMF	2013	(Israel) Hapoel Haifa
11	(Israel)	Maor Buzaglo	AM	2013	(Belgium) Standard Liège
17	(Israel)	Kobi Dajani	DMF	2013	(Israel) Maccabi Netanya
24	(Israel)	Maor Melikson	AM	2014	(France) Valenciennes FC
29	(Israel)	Roei Gordana	CMF	2014	(Israel) Hapoel Tel Aviv
Forwards
9	(Israel)	Tomer Swisa	CF	2012	(Israel) Ironi Nir Ramat HaSharon
10	(Israel)	Elyaniv Barda	CF	2013	(Belgium) K.R.C.Genk
16	(Israel)	Dovev Gabay	ST	2011	(Israel) Maccabi Petah Tikva
28	(Israel)	Shlomi Arbeitman	ST	2014	(Belgium) R.A.E.C.Mons

== Transfers and loans ==
=== In ===
Date	Pos.	Name	From	Fee
13 June 2014	ST	(Israel) Shlomi Arbeitman	(Belgium) R.A.E.C.Mons	Free transfer
25 June 2014	RB/MR	(Israel) Dor Malul	(Israel) Beitar Jerusalem	Free transfer
27 June 2014	GK	(Israel) Robi Levkovich		Free transfer
1 July 2014	CB	(Serbia) Tomislav Pajović	(Moldova) Sheriff Tiraspol	Free transfer
1 July 2014	CB	(Israel) Joakim Daniel Askling	(Israel) Hapoel Kfar Saba	Free transfer
10 July 2014	AM	(Israel) Maor Melikson	(France) Valenciennes FC	200K€
10 July 2014	CMF	(Israel) Roei Gordana	(Israel) Hapoel Tel Aviv	Free transfer

=== Out ===
Date	Pos.	Name	To	Fee
30 June 2014	DMF	(Belgium) David Hubert	(Belgium) K.A.A.Gent	End of Loan
30 June 2014	CB	(Serbia) Tomislav Pajović	(Moldova) Sheriff Tiraspol	End of Loan
4 July 2014	CM	(Israel) Lotem Zino	(Switzerland) FC Thun	200K€
July 2014	FW	(Israel) Nicolás Falczuk		Released
9 July 2014	ST	(Netherlands) Glynor Plet	(Belgium) S.V. Zulte Waregem	Contract ending

== Pre-season and Friendlies ==
3 July 2014 Friendly	VMFD Žalgiris Vilnius (Lithuania)	1 – 0	(Israel) Hapoel Be'er Sheva	Stadium in Poland, Poland
	A.Jankauskas 79'

5 July 2014 Friendly	Zawisza Bydgoszcz (Poland)	0 – 1	(Israel) Hapoel Be'er Sheva	Zdzisław Krzyszkowiak Stadium, Poland
			E.Barda 45'

8 July 2014 Friendly	Legia Warsaw (Poland)	1 – 0	(Israel) Hapoel Be'er Sheva	Pepsi Arena, Poland
	M.Żyro 56'

== UEFA Europa League ==
=== Second qualifying round ===
17 July 2014 Europa League	RNK Split (Croatia)	2 - 1	(Israel) Hapoel Be'er Sheva	Split, Croatia
20:30	Dujmović 78'; Bilić 86' (pen.)		Buzaglo 31'	Stadium: Stadion Park mladeži

24 July 2014 Europa League	Hapoel Be'er Sheva (Israel)	0 - 0 (1 - 2 agg.)	(Croatia) RNK Split	Larnaca, Cyprus
15:30	Barda (yellow card) 30'; Arbeitman (yellow card) 65'; Buzaglo (yellow card) 71'; Bitton (yellow card) 80'	Summary	Ibriks (yellow card) 15'; Glumac (yellow card) 35'; Erceg (yellow card) 65'	Stadium: GSZ Stadium; Attendance: 170

== Israel League Cup [Toto cup] ==
=== Group C ===
Pos	Team	Pld	W	D	L	GF	GA	GD	Pts	HPT	ASH	MPT	BEI	HBS
1	Hapoel Petah Tikva (A)	4	2	1	1	7	3	+4	7		4–0			1–1
2	F.C. Ironi Ashdod (A)	4	2	1	1	5	5	0	7				1–0	1–1
3	Maccabi Petah Tikva (A)	4	1	2	1	1	3	−2	5	1–0	0–3			
4	Beitar Jerusalem	4	1	1	2	4	3	+1	4	1–2		0–0		
5	Hapoel Be'er Sheva	4	0	3	1	2	5	−3	3			0–0	0–3	

Source: football.org.il (in Hebrew)
Legend: Blue = home team win; Yellow = draw; Red = away team win.
Rules for classification: 1st points; 2nd goal difference; 3rd matches won; 4th goals scored; 5th head-to-head; 6th decision match
(A) Advanced to the quarterfinals
