= 2015–16 Hapoel Be'er Sheva F.C. season =

Hapoel Be'er Sheva
2015–16 season
- Chairman: Alona Barkat
- Manager: Barak Bakhar
- Stadium: Turner Stadium
- Israeli Premier League: Champions
- Israel State Cup: Semi-finalists

The 2015–16 season was Hapoel Be'er Sheva's 67th season since its establishment, in May 1949. During the season, the team played in the Israeli Premier League, State Cup and Toto Cup domestically, and in the Europa League.

At the end of the season, the club had won the Israeli Premier League, its first league title since 1976 and its first major trophy since 1997.

== Current squad ==
As of 23 June 2015

No.	Nat.	Player	Pos	In the club since	Previous club
Goalkeepers
1	(Israel)	David Goresh	GK	2015	(Israel) Hapoel Acre
22	(Israel)	Robi Levkovich	GK	2014	(Israel) Maccabi Netanya
36	(Israel)	Raz Rahamim	GK	2014	(Israel) Hapoel Be'er Sheva U19
Defenders
2	(Israel)	Ben Bitton	RB	2013	(Israel) Hapoel Nazareth Illit
3	(Israel)	Matan Ohayon	CB	2015	(Israel) Hapoel Tel Aviv
4	(Israel)	Shir Tzedek	CB	2015	(Israel) Ironi Kiryat Shmona
13	(Israel)	Ofir Davidzada	LB	2010	(Israel) Hapoel Be'er Sheva U19
14	(Israel)	Evyatar Iluz	RB	2006	(Israel) Hapoel Petah Tikva
17	(Israel)	Ben Algrabli	CB	2013	(Israel) Hapoel Be'er Sheva U19
20	(Israel)	Loai Taha	CB	2015	(Israel) Hapoel Ra'anana
23	(Serbia)	Tomislav Pajović	CB	2013	(Moldova) Sheriff Tiraspol
25	(Brazil)	William Ribeiro Soares	CB/DMF	2010	(Israel) Hapoel Ramat Gan
Midfielders
7	(Israel)	Siraj Nassar	AM	2009	(Israel) Maccabi Kafr Kanna
11	(Israel)	Maor Buzaglo	AM	2013	(Belgium) Standard Liège
12	(Romania)	Ovidiu Hoban	DM	2014	(Romania) FC Petrolul Ploiești
24	(Israel)	Maor Melikson	AM	2014	(France) Valenciennes FC
29	(Israel)	Roei Gordana	CMF	2014	(Israel) Hapoel Tel Aviv
30	(Nigeria)	John Ogu	CMF	2014	(Portugal) Académica de Coimbra
Forwards
9	(Nigeria)	Anthony Nwakaeme	CF	2015	(Israel) Hapoel Ra'anana
10	(Israel)	Elyaniv Barda	CF	2013	(Belgium) K.R.C.Genk
28	(Israel)	Shlomi Arbeitman	ST	2014	(Belgium) R.A.E.C.Mons

== Transfers and loans ==
=== In ===
Date	Pos.	Name	From	Fee
1 June 2015	CB	(Israel) Shir Tzedek	(Israel) Ironi Kiryat Shmona	€298K
14 June 2015	ST	(Nigeria) Anthony Nwakaeme	(Israel) Hapoel Ra'anana	€650K
16 June 2015	GK	(Israel) David Goresh	(Israel) Hapoel Acre	Free transfer
16 June 2015	CB	(Israel) Matan Ohayon	(Israel) Hapoel Tel Aviv	Free transfer
12 July 2015	MF	(Israel) Maharan Radi	(Israel) Maccabi Tel Aviv	Free transfer

=== Out ===
Date	Pos.	Name	To	Fee
9 June 2015	RB/MR	(Israel) Dor Malul		Released
10 June 2015	ST	(Israel) Tomer Swisa		Released
10 June 2015	GK	(Nigeria) Austin Ejide		Released
10 June 2015	DM	(Israel) Gal Harel		Released
15 June 2015	ST	(Israel) Dovev Gabay	(Israel) Beitar Jerusalem	End of contract

== Pre-season and friendlies ==
30 June 2015 Training camp	Hapoel Be'er Sheva (Israel)	3 - 1	(Czech Republic) Frýdek-Místek	Austria
	Gordana 58'; Barda 80'; Bukara 90'		Zapalač 66'

4 July 2015 Training camp	Hapoel Be'er Sheva (Israel)	0 - 1	(Poland) Górnik Łęczna	Austria
			Kaźmierczak 61'

7 July 2015 Training camp	Hapoel Be'er Sheva (Israel)	2 - 1	(Poland) Korona Kielce	Austria
	Buzaglo 25' (pen.); Hoban 33'		Michał Przybyła 66'

== UEFA Europa League ==
=== Second qualifying round ===
16 July 2015 Europa League	Hapoel Be'er Sheva (Israel)	1 - 1	(Switzerland) Thun	Jerusalem, Israel
20:30	Hoban 26'	Report	Frontino 87' (pen.)	Stadium: Teddy Stadium; Attendance: 11,796; Referee: Bart Vertenten (Belgium)

23 July 2015 Europa League	Thun (Switzerland)	2 - 1	(Israel) Hapoel Be'er Sheva	Thun, Switzerland
	Ferreira 40', 72' (yellow card) 54'; Zino (yellow card) 47'; Sulmoni (yellow card) 61'		Ogu 6'; Tzedek (red card) 20'; Davidzada (yellow card) 54'; Soares (yellow card) 63'	Stadium: Stockhorn Arena

== Israel League Cup [Toto cup] ==
=== Group B ===
Pos	Team	Pld	W	D	L	GF	GA	GD	Pts	MNE	HBS	BEI	HRA	HKS
1	Maccabi Netanya (A)	4	2	2	0	4	0	+4	8		2–0	2–0		
2	Hapoel Be'er Sheva (A)	4	2	1	1	7	3	+4	7			4–0		2–0
3	Beitar Jerusalem (A)	4	2	0	2	2	6	−4	6				1–0	1–0
4	Hapoel Ra'anana	4	1	2	1	2	2	0	5	0–0	1–1			
5	Hapoel Kfar Saba	4	0	1	3	0	4	−4	1	0–0			0–1	

Updated to match(es) played on 17 August 2015. Source: football.org.il (in Hebrew)
Rules for classification: 1st points; 2nd goal difference; 3rd matches won; 4th goals scored; 5th head-to-head; 6th decision match
(A) Advanced to the quarter finals
