= Omer Nachmani =

Israeli footballer

Omer Nachmani עומר נחמני
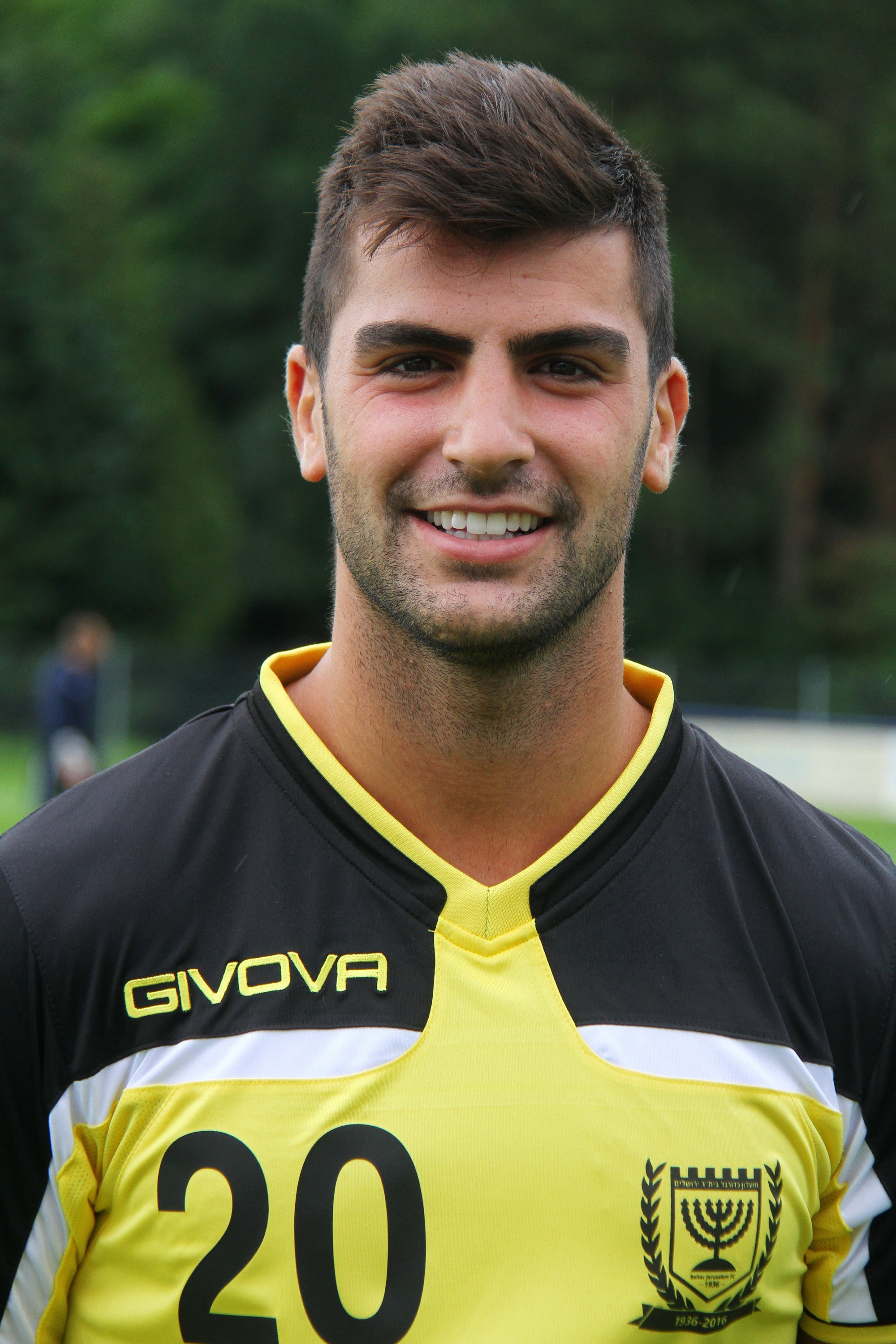
- Nachmani with Beitar Jerusalem in 2016

Personal information
- Full name: Omer Nachmani
- Date of birth: 29 October 1993 (age 33)
- Place of birth: Jerusalem, Israel
- Height: 1.78 m (5 ft 10 in)
- Position: Attacking midfielder

Youth career
- 2006–2013: Beitar Jerusalem

Senior career*
Years	Team	Apps	(Gls)
2012–2017	Beitar Jerusalem	25	(0)
2013–2014	→ Maccabi Herzliya (loan)	14	(1)

International career
2011–2012	Israel U-19	3	(1)
- * Club domestic league appearances and goals

Omer Nachmani (Hebrew: עומר נחמני; born 29 October 1993) is a former Israeli footballer.

His brother Eden and his father Shuki were also former footballers and played for Beitar Jerusalem.

== Club career ==
=== Beitar Jerusalem ===
Nachmani played from the age of 12 with Beitar Jerusalem Youth, playing his first match for the club with Beitar Jerusalem Gadi (the U-15 squad) on 30 September 2006. The following week he scored his first goal for the club giving Beitar Jerusalem the only goal in the Jerusalem derby against Hapoel Jerusalem Youth.

Nachmani debuted for the senior team on 25 August 2012 in a 3–2 loss to Ironi Kiryat Shmona, playing the first 75 minutes.

=== Maccabi Herzliya ===
For the 2013–14 season Nachmani was loaned out to Maccabi Herzliya of the Liga Leumit. He debuted for them in a 0–0 draw against Hapoel Petah Tikva on 20 September 2013, being substituted on in the 67th minute. During the whole season Nachmani played 13 matches, scoring 1 goal.
