= Snir Mishan =

Israeli footballer

Snir Mishan שניר משען
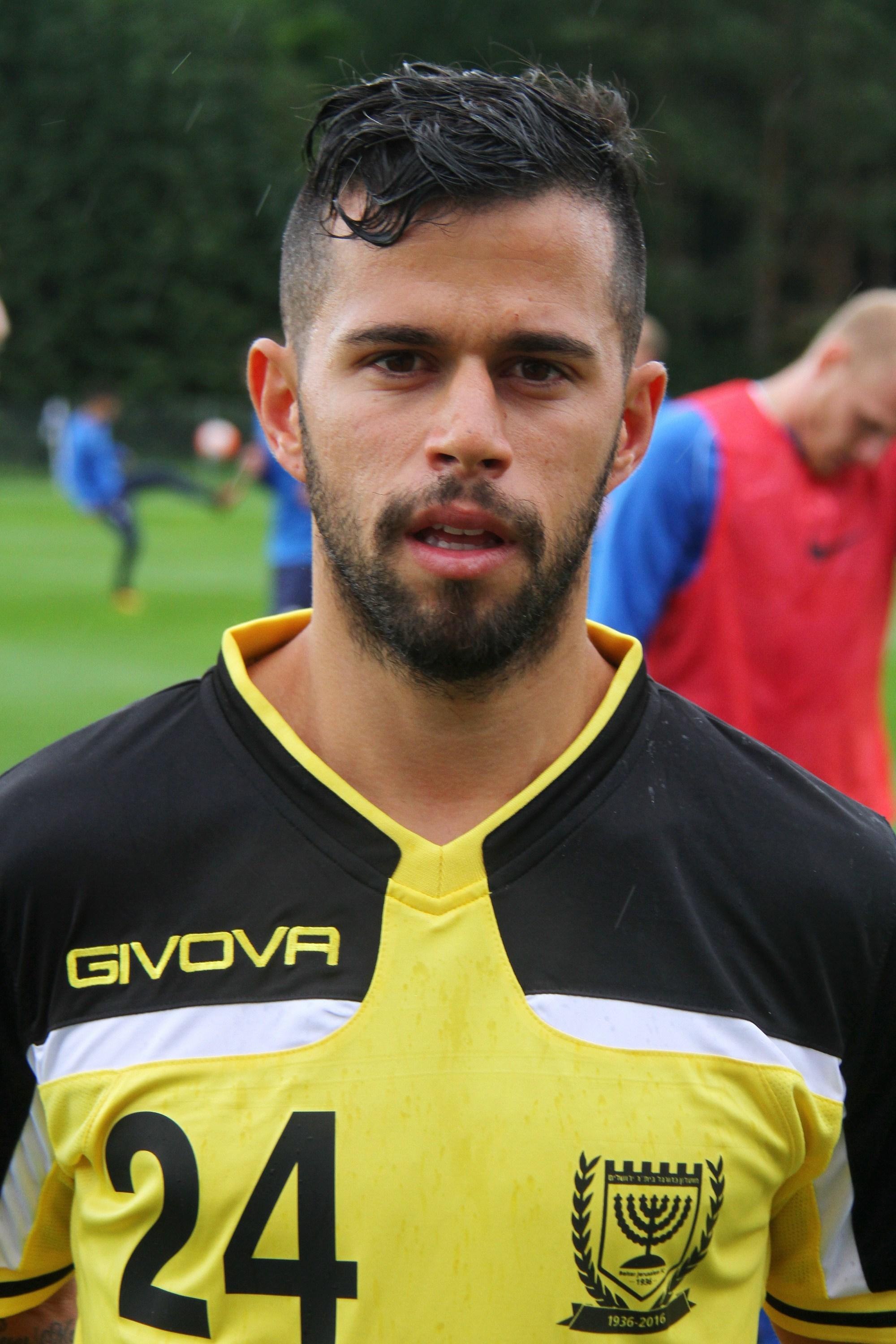
- Mishan with Beitar Jerusalem in 2016

Personal information
- Full name: Snir Mishan
- Date of birth: 13 November 1988 (age 37)
- Place of birth: Haifa, Israel
- Position: Defender

Team information
- Current team: Hapoel Ashkelon

Youth career
- Maccabi Haifa

Senior career*
Years	Team	Apps	(Gls)
2006–2008	Maccabi Haifa	0	(0)
2008–2010	Hapoel Ra'anana	20	(0)
2010–2011	Maccabi Ironi Bat Yam	23	(0)
2011–2012	Hapoel Kfar Saba	25	(0)
2012–2015	Hapoel Acre	77	(0)
2015–2016	Beitar Jerusalem	3	(0)
2016–2017	Hapoel Ashkelon	0	(0)
- * Club domestic league appearances and goals as of 13 November 2015

Snir Mishan (Hebrew: שניר משען; born 13 November 1988) is a former Israeli footballer.

== Career ==
Mishan was brought up through the ranks of Maccabi Haifa and made his first team debut on 28 February 2007, in a Toto Cup match., but didn't appear in any other senior matches for the club, instead joining Hapoel Ra'anana in 2008.

With Mishan, Hapoel Ra'anana won promotion to the Israel Premier League, and as in the following season, Mishan returned to Liga Leumit to play with Maccabi Ironi Bat Yam and Hapoel Kfar Saba. In 2012, Mishan signed with Hapoel Acre and made his Premier League debut on 15 September 2012, against Bnei Sakhnin. After three seasons with Hapoel Acre, Mishan transferred to Beitar Jerusalem in summer 2015.

Mishan represented Israel with the national U-19 team and U-17 team and was part of the U-17 team in the 2005 UEFA European Under-17 Championship, playing in all of the team's matches in the championship.
