= Bryan Jones (footballer) =

Brazilian footballer (born 1990)

Personal information
- Full name: Bryan Jones Anicézio
- Date of birth: 23 January 1990 (age 36)
- Place of birth: Campinas, Brazil
- Height: 1.80 m (5 ft 11 in)
- Position: Second striker

Team information
- Current team: Sarawak United F.C.

Youth career
- 2003–2006: Guarani
- 2008–2010: Internacional

Senior career*
Years	Team	Apps	(Gls)
2011	Internacional	0	(0)
2011	→ Criciúma (loan)	2	(0)
2012	Palmeiras B	7	(0)
2013	CRB	1	(0)
2013	Tupi	1	(0)
2013–2014	Beitar Jerusalem	26	(3)
2014	Hapoel Ramat Gan	8	(1)
2016–2017	Al-Nahda	?	(?)
2017	Al-Adalah	?	(?)
2017–2018	Ironi Nesher	23	(3)
2019	Luverdense	0	(0)
2020–	Kuching City F.C.	10	(4)
- * Club domestic league appearances and goals as of 1 November 2020

Bryan Jones Anicézio (born 23 January 1990), sometimes known as just Bryan, is a Brazilian professional footballer who plays as a forward for Malaysia Premier League club Sarawak United.

== Club career ==
=== Brazil ===
Bryan Jones spent his youth from the age of 13 at Guarani and later on, at Internacional.

In 2011, Bryan Jones joined the senior team of Internacional, and they won the Gaúcho that year.

Later that year, in July, Bryan Jones was loaned to Criciúma of the Série B. He made his debut on 23 July, in a league match against Paraná, substituting Ronny in the 68th minute. Apart from his debut, he played only one more game for the club.

In 2012, Bryan Jones joined Palmeiras B of the Paulista A2 and played 7 games for the club, coming on as a substitute in all 7 games.

At the beginning of 2013, Bryan Jones joined CRB of the Série C to compete with them in the Copa do Nordeste, at the same time as Paulo Sérgio, signing a contract until 15 December. He only played one game for the club.

A month later, Bryan Jones had a chance to return to Palmeiras, but decided to join Tupi, who compete in the Série D and the Mineiro leagues, giving praise to the club's tradition. He only played one game for Tupi, in the Copa do Brasil.

=== Israel ===
In September 2013, Bryan Jones signed a year-long contract with Beitar Jerusalem of the Israeli Premier League.

Bryan Jones scored his debut goal on 8 December, in a match against Maccabi Tel Aviv. In the 83rd minute he shot the ball with his right foot from the edge of the box after a solo run.

On 11 August 2014 signed to Hapoel Ramat Gan.

=== Back to Brazil ===
Bryan Jones returned to Brazil in January 2019, when he signed with Luverdense on 11 January. The club announced his departure in April 2019.

== Honours ==
With Internacional

- Gaúcho: 2011

With CRB

- Alagoano: 2013
