= Uri Magbo =

Israeli footballer

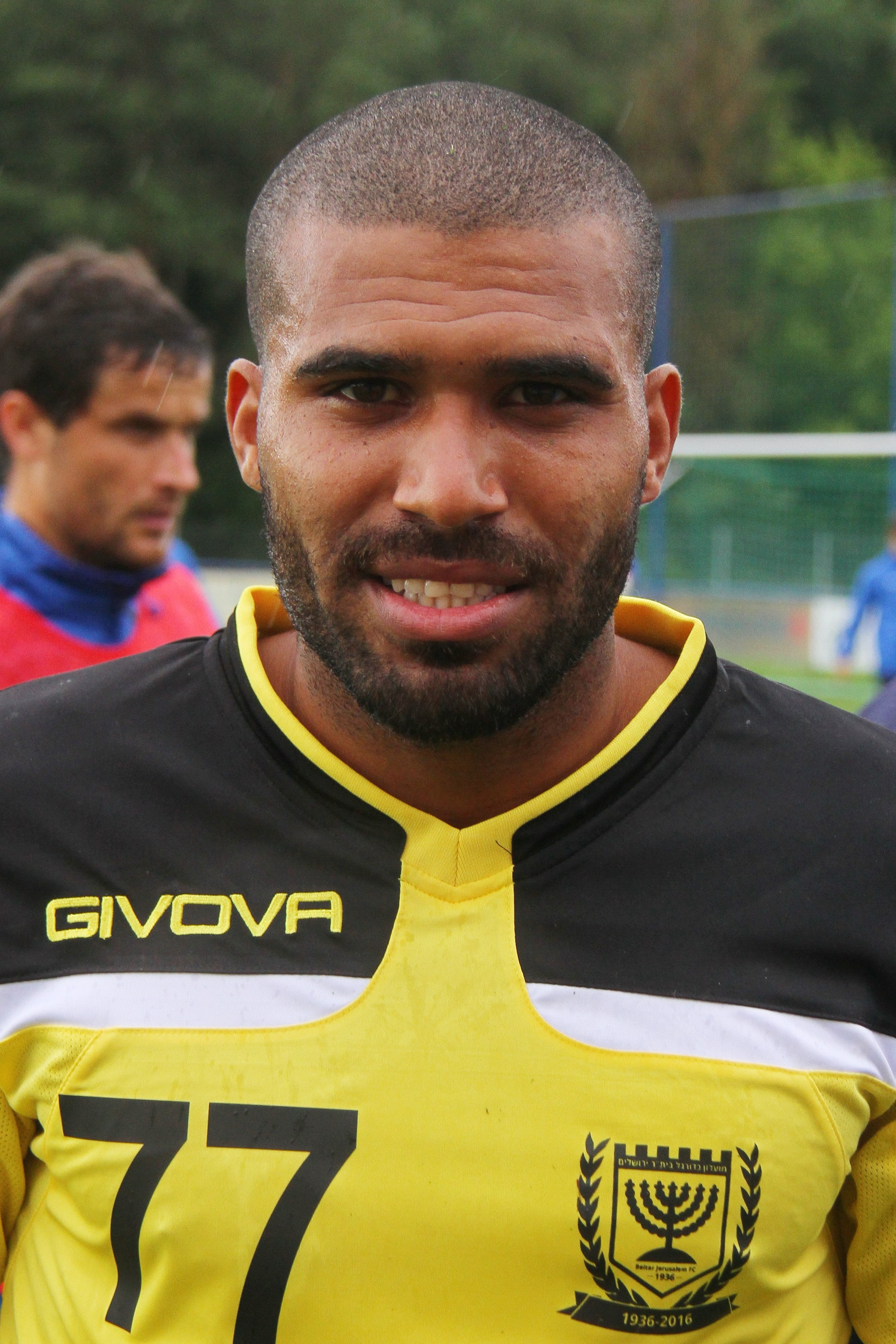
- Magbo with Beitar Jerusalem in 2016

Personal information
- Full name: Arel Uri Magbo
- Date of birth: 12 September 1987 (age 39)
- Place of birth: Bat Yam, Israel
- Height: 1.80 m (5 ft 11 in)
- Position: Left back

Team information
- Current team: Hapoel Hadera
- Number: 28

Youth career
- Maccabi Jaffa

Senior career*
Years	Team	Apps	(Gls)
2006–2008	A.S. Ramat Eliyahu	46	(10)
2008–2009	F.C. Bnei Jaffa	13	(2)
2009	→ Hapoel Rishon LeZion (loan)	13	(1)
2009–2010	Hapoel Rishon LeZion (loan)	25	(0)
2010–2012	F.C. Ashdod	21	(0)
2012	→ Hapoel Ashkelon (loan)	13	(3)
2012–2013	Hakoah Amidar Ramat Gan	25	(0)
2013–2014	Hapoel Ashkelon	30	(2)
2014–2015	Beitar Tel Aviv Ramla	37	(9)
2015–2017	Beitar Jerusalem	15	(0)
2017–2018	Maccabi Petah Tikva	33	(1)
2018–2019	Ironi Kiryat Shmona	15	(0)
2019–2021	Beitar Jerusalem	45	(6)
2021–2022	Hapoel Kfar Saba	35	(1)
2022–2023	Sektzia Ness Ziona	25	(0)
2023–2025	Maccabi Jaffa	60	(0)
2025–	Hapoel Hadera	31	(0)
- * Club domestic league appearances and goals as of 24 June 2026

Uri Magbo (Hebrew: אורי מגבו; born 12 September 1987) is an Israeli footballer who currently plays for Hapoel Hadera.

== Early life ==
Magbo was born in Tel Aviv District, Israel. His father is African-American of Nigerian descent, whereas his mother is Jewish-Israeli and of Persian-Jewish descent.

== Career ==
Magbo was brought up through the ranks of Maccabi Jaffa and joined the club's senior squad, which played under the name A.S. Ramat Eliyahu in 2006. In 2008, the club merged again, with Hapoel Ihud Tzeirei Jaffa, to form F.C. Bnei Jaffa, where Magbo played until he was loaned in mid-season to Liga Artzit club Hapoel Rishon LeZion, which was made a permanent transfer at the end of the season. In 2010, Magbo transferred to Premier League side F.C. Ashdod, where he made his Premier League debut on 28 August 2010, against Ironi Kiryat Shmona, coming on as a substitute. The following season, Magbo was loaned to Liga Leumit club Hapoel Ashkelon, and at the end of the season, moved to another Liga Leumit club, Hakoah Amidar Ramat Gan. Magbo spent the next three seasons in Liga Leumit, and in 2015 was bought by Beitar Jerusalem, with which he played his first matches in European competitions. On 24 September 2019 Uri Magbo scored his first goal as Beitar Jerusalem player, while winning Toto Cup Al.

== Honours ==
=== Team ===
==== Beitar Jerusalem ====
- 2019–20 Toto Cup Al : 24 September 2019
