= Avishay Cohen =

Israeli footballer

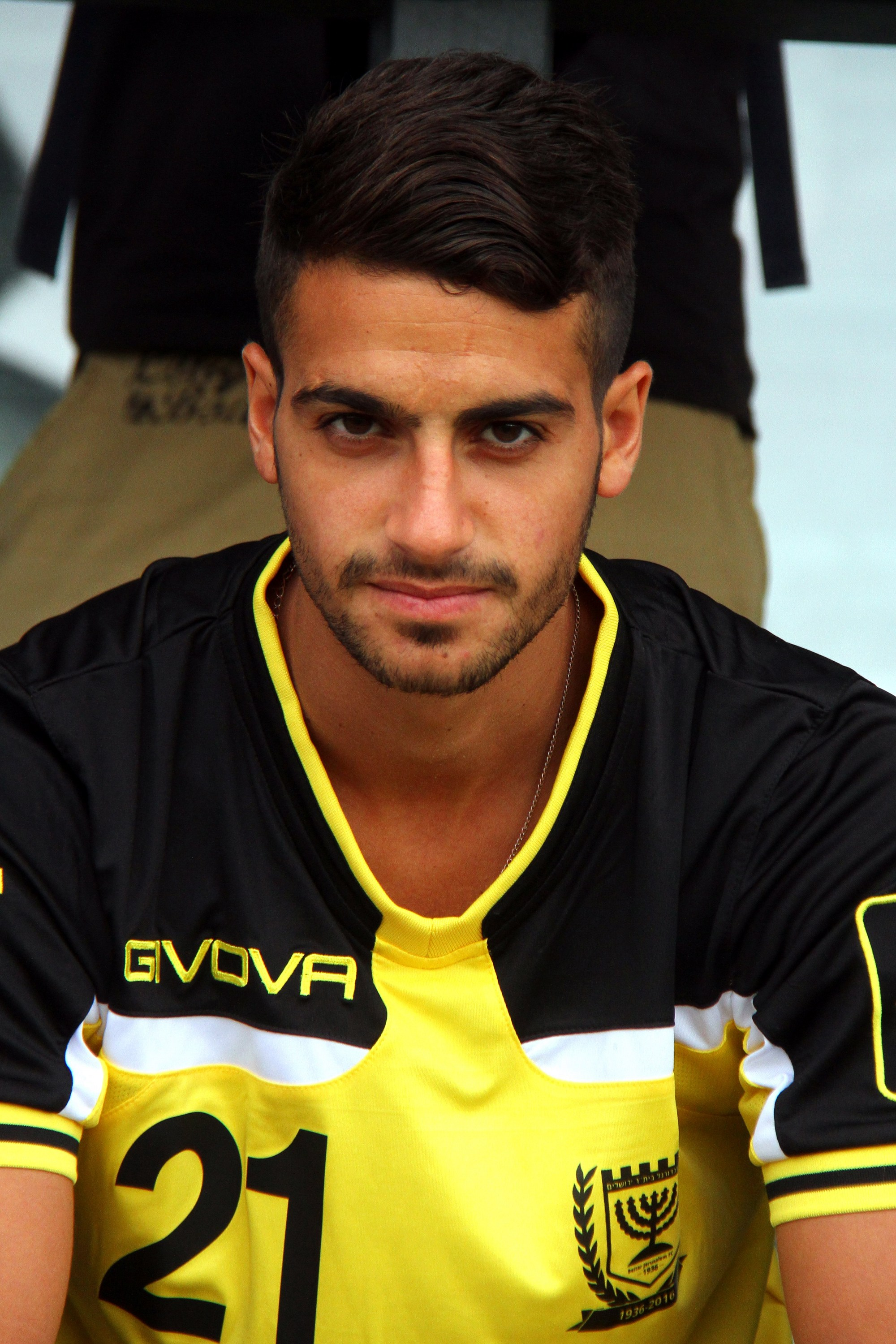
- Cohen with Beitar Jerusalem in 2016

Personal information
- Full name: Avishay Cohen
- Date of birth: June 19, 1995 (age 31)
- Place of birth: Jerusalem, Israel
- Height: 1.81 m (5 ft 11 1/2 in)
- Position: Defender

Team information
- Current team: Ashdod
- Number: 2

Youth career
- 2010–2014: Beitar Jerusalem

Senior career*
Years	Team	Apps	(Gls)
2014–2018	Beitar Jerusalem	25	(0)
2017–2018	→ Beitar Tel Aviv Ramla (loan)	10	(0)
2018	→ Hapoel Katamon (loan)	14	(0)
2019–2022	Bnei Yehuda	111	(4)
2022–2023	Beitar Jerusalem	26	(1)
2023–2026	Maccabi Tel Aviv	23	(0)
2026–	Ashdod	11	(1)

International career^{‡}
2013	Israel U18	2	(2)
2013	Israel U19	2	(2)
2023–	Israel	1	(0)
- * Club domestic league appearances and goals as of 24 June 2026 ‡ National team caps and goals as of 21 November 2023

Avishay Cohen (Hebrew: אבישי כהן; born 19 June 1995) is an Israeli footballer who plays for Ashdod and the Israel national team.
