= Eden Nachmani =

Israeli footballer

Eden Nachmani עדן נחמני
Personal information
- Date of birth: 31 October 1990 (age 36)
- Place of birth: Jerusalem, Israel
- Height: 1.83 m (6 ft 0 in)
- Position: Forward

Youth career
- Beitar Jerusalem

Senior career*
Years	Team	Apps	(Gls)
2010–2016	Beitar Jerusalem	18	(0)
2012–2013	→ Hapoel Jerusalem (loan)	22	(2)
2014–2015	→ Sektzia Ness Ziona (loan)	34	(14)
2015–2016	→ Hapoel Hod HaSharon (loan)	13	(7)
2016	Ihud Bnei MAjd al-Krum	14	(3)
- * Club domestic league appearances and goals

Eden Nachmani (Hebrew: עדן נחמני; born 31 October 1990) is an Israeli footballer. He plays as a forward for Ihud Bnei Majd al-Krum.

== Club career ==
=== Beitar Jerusalem ===
Nachmani made his debut appearance with Beitar Jerusalem on 21 August 2010, coming on as a substitute in the 77th minute, after the team were losing by 3 goals.

Nachmani scored his debut goal for Beitar Jerusalem in the Toto Cup, beating Hapoel Rishon LeZion 1–0 on 14 August 2011.

=== Hapoel Jerusalem ===
On 15 August 2012, Nachmani signed a loan contract for a season with Hapoel Jerusalem. By the end of the month, Nachmani made his debut appearance with Hapoel Jerusalem, playing 69 minutes of a 1–1 draw against Hapoel Bnei Lod in Israel's second-tier league. Five months later, he scored his debut goal in senior football, in a 3–1 loss to Hapoel Nazareth Illit.

=== Sektzia Ness Ziona ===
In January 2014, following a lot of purchases by Beitar Jerusalem to strengthen the team, Nachmani signed on loan with Sektzia Ness Ziona.

== Career statistics ==
As of 13 September 2014

Club	Season	League		State Cup		Toto Cup		Total	
Club	Season	Apps	Goals	Apps	Goals	Apps	Goals	Apps	Goals
Beitar Jerusalem	2010–11	1	0	0	0	0	0	1	0
Beitar Jerusalem	2011–12	15	0	1	0	3	1	19	1
Beitar Jerusalem	2013–14	2	0	0	0	–	–	2	0
Beitar Jerusalem	Total	18	0	1	0	3	1	22	1
Hapoel Jerusalem (loan)	2012–13	22	2	0	0	0	0	22	2
Hapoel Jerusalem (loan)	Total	22	2	0	0	0	0	22	2
Sektzia Ness Ziona (loan)	2013–14	6	3	0	0	0	0	6	3
Sektzia Ness Ziona (loan)	Total	6	3	0	0	0	0	6	3
Career total		46	5	1	0	3	1	50	6

1. Liga Leumit matches.
2. Liga Alef matches.
