= Dušan Matović =

Serbian footballer

Dušan Matović Душaн Maтoвић
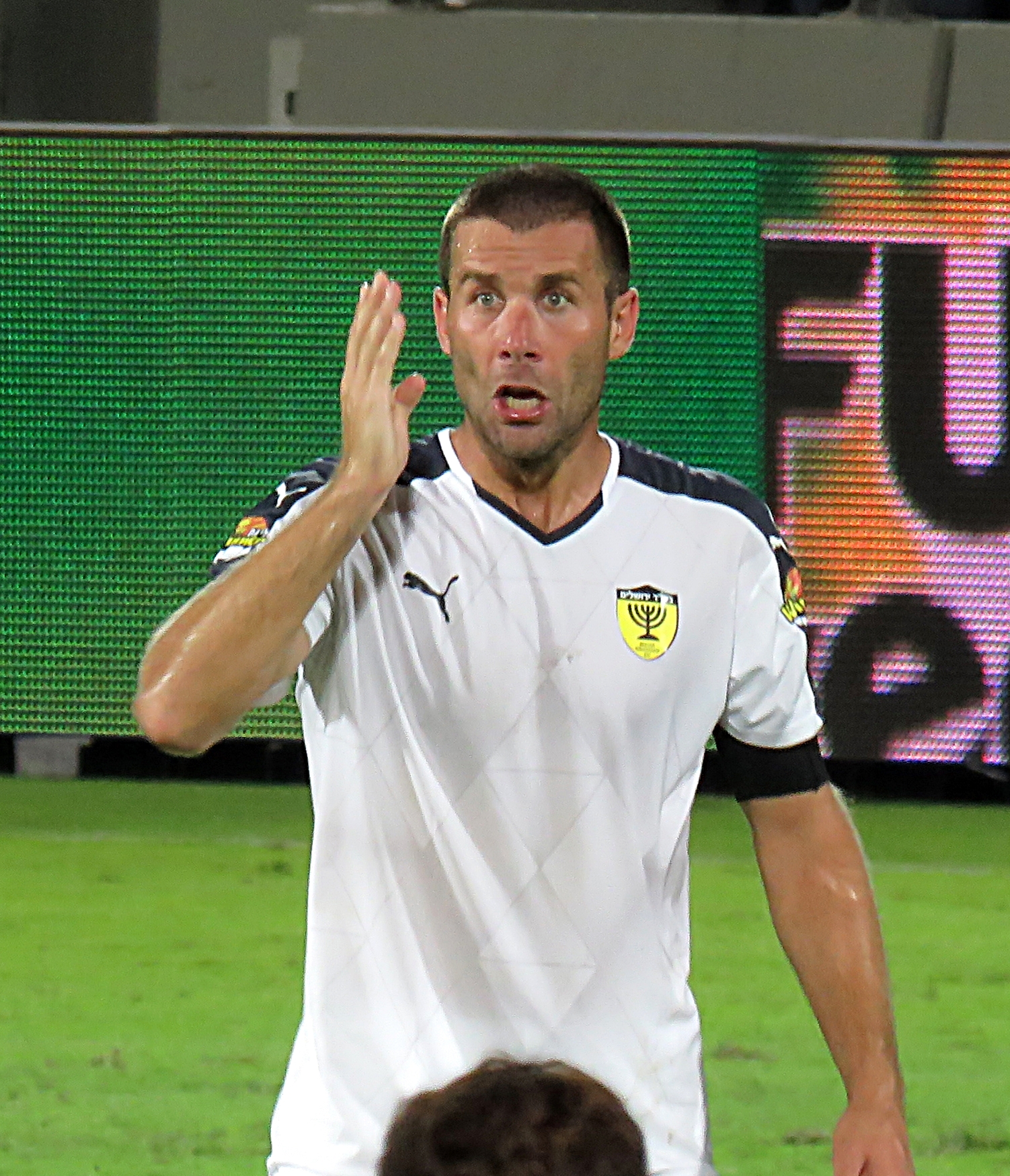
- Matović with Beitar Jerusalem in 2015

Personal information
- Date of birth: 8 July 1983 (age 43)
- Place of birth: Belgrade, SFR Yugoslavia
- Height: 1.82 m (5 ft 11 1/2 in)
- Position: Defender

Senior career*
Years	Team	Apps	(Gls)
2002–2003	Dorćol		
2003–2004	Tatran Prešov		
2005–2006	Sport Podbrezová		
2006–2007	Inter Bratislava	42	(0)
2008–2011	Ekranas	94	(6)
2011–2014	Ironi Kiryat Shmona	72	(3)
2014–2016	Beitar Jerusalem	81	(2)
2016–2018	Hapoel Kfar Saba	55	(1)
2018	Minsk	13	(0)
2019	Voždovac	2	(0)
2020	Hapoel Bnei Lod	17	(0)
2020–2021	Sektzia Ness Ziona	31	(2)

Managerial career
- 2021–2022: Bnei Sakhnin (assistant)
- 2023: Hapoel Tel Aviv (assistant)
- 2023–2024: Maccabi Haifa (assistant)
- 2024–2026: Hapoel Tel Aviv (assistant)
- * Club domestic league appearances and goals

Dušan Matović (Serbian Cyrillic: Душaн Maтoвић; born 8 July 1983) is a former Serbian footballer, and Hapoel Tel Aviv assistant manager.

== Career ==
He has played for Tatran Prešov, ŽP Šport Podbrezová, Inter Bratislava.

== Honours ==
Ironi Kiryat Shmona

- Israeli Premier League: 2011–12
- Toto Cup: 2011–12
