= Tomer Yerucham =

Israeli footballer

Tomer Yerucham תומר ירוחם
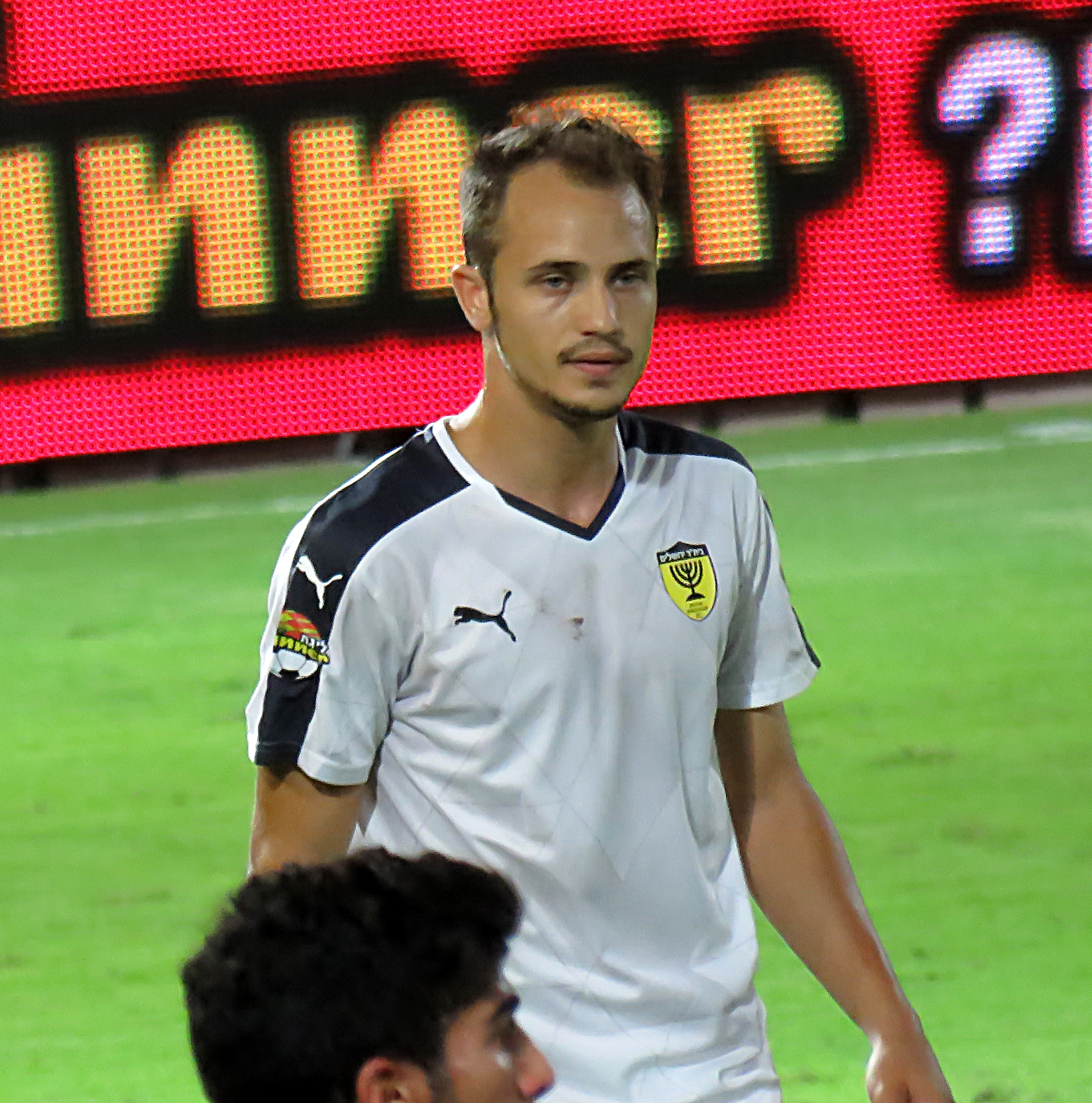
- Yerucham playing for Beitar Jerusalem in 2015

Personal information
- Full name: Tomer Yerucham
- Date of birth: 6 April 1993 (age 33)
- Place of birth: Modi'in, Israel
- Height: 1.74 m (5 ft 9 in)
- Position: Right back

Team information
- Current team: Hapoel Lod

Youth career
- Beitar Jerusalem

Senior career*
Years	Team	Apps	(Gls)
2010–2016	Beitar Jerusalem	24	(0)
2013	→ Hapoel Rishon LeZion (loan)	6	(0)
2014	→ Maccabi Yavne (loan)	15	(1)
2016	→ Maccabi Yavne (loan)	12	(0)
2016	Maccabi Kiryat Gat	3	(1)
2016	Hapoel Marmorek	3	(0)
2016–2017	Bnei Jaffa	15	(1)
2018–2019	Hapoel Lod	16	(2)
2019	Ironi Modi'in	3	(0)

International career
2011–2012	Israel U19	5	(0)
- * Club domestic league appearances and goals

Tomer Yerucham, (Hebrew: תומר ירוחם; born 6 April 1993 in Modi'in) is an Israeli former footballer. He plays as a right back for Hapoel Lod.

== Club career ==
=== Beitar Jerusalem ===
Yerucham made his debut with Beitar Jerusalem on 8 May 2012, coming on as a substitute in the final minutes of a league match against Hapoel Haifa.

=== Hapoel Rishon LeZion ===
At the end of January 2013, Yerucham was loaned to Hapoel Rishon LeZion with the aim of receiving playing time. Yerucham made his debut with Hapoel Rishon LeZion on 11 February 2013, playing in a 2–0 victory over Beitar Shimshon Tel Aviv in Israel's second-tier league. During his loan, he played in 6 matches with Hapoel Rishon LeZion.

=== Maccabi Yavne ===
In February 2014, Yerucham was loaned to Maccabi Yavne until the end of the season.

=== Maccabi Kiryat Gat ===
On 18 September 2016 released from Beitar and signed to Maccabi Kiryat Gat.

== International career ==
Yerucham was part of Israel's under-19 squad for the 2012 UEFA U19 Championship. He played in all three games of the qualifying stage, which Israel finished in the third place. He continued to play two out of three games in the elite qualifying stage.

=== TV Appearance ===
In 2016 Yerucham participated in the seventh season of the Israeli TV series Mehubarim (the local version of "Connected").
