= Joakim Askling =

Swedish footballer (born 1990)

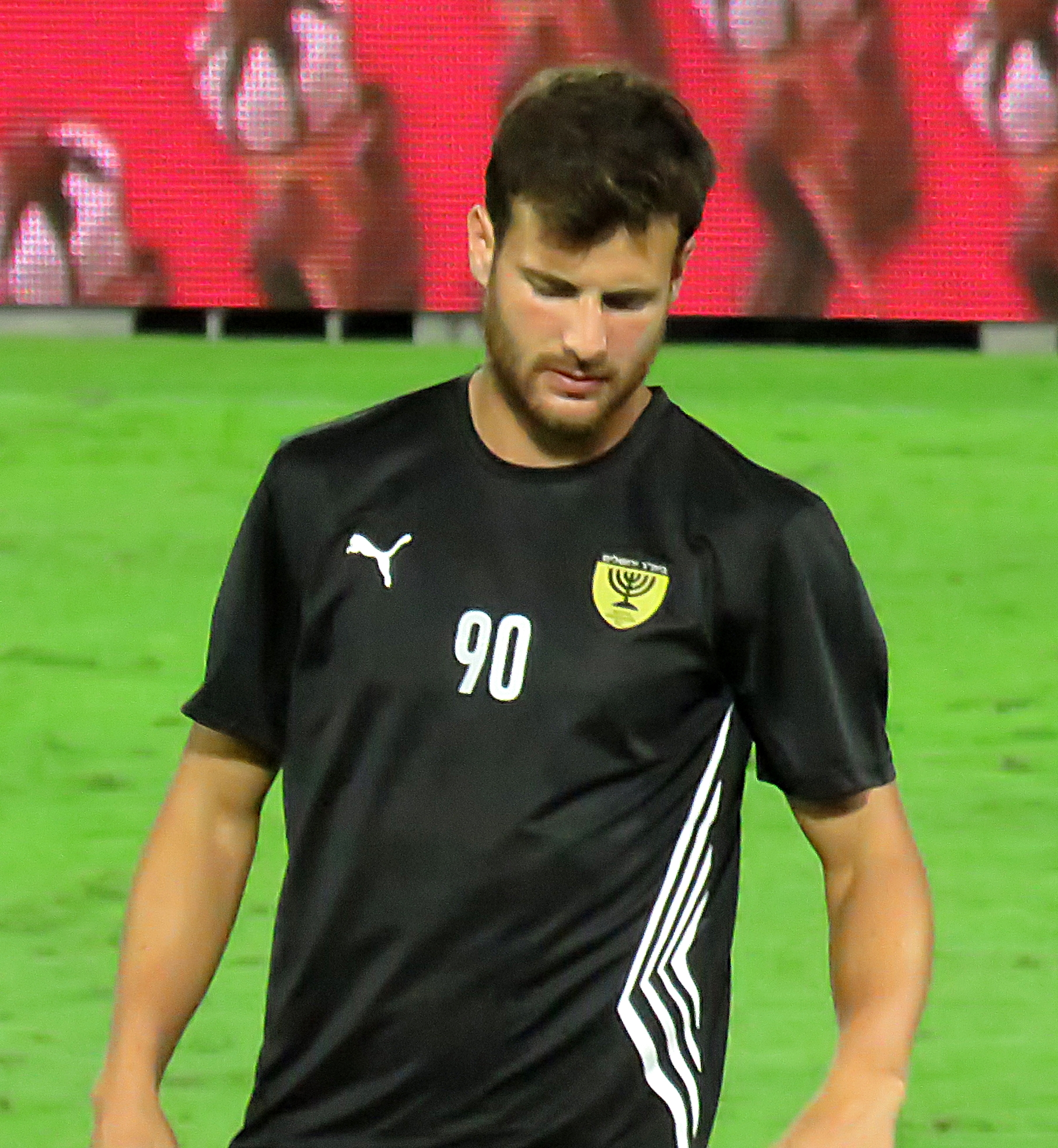
- Askling playing for Beitar Jerusalem in 2015

Personal information
- Full name: Joakim Daniel Askling
- Date of birth: 4 January 1990 (age 36)
- Place of birth: Stockholm, Sweden
- Height: 1.88 m (6 ft 2 in)
- Position: Centre-back

Youth career
- Enskede IK
- Hammarby IF

Senior career*
Years	Team	Apps	(Gls)
2008	Djurgårdens IF	0	(0)
2008–2011	AlbinoLeffe	1	(0)
2011–2013	Spårvägens FF	31	(1)
2013–2014	Hapoel Kfar Saba	23	(2)
2014–2015	Hapoel Be'er Sheva	1	(0)
2015	Beitar Tel Aviv Ramla	14	(1)
2015–2016	Beitar Jerusalem	6	(0)
2016	Assyriska FF	7	(0)

International career
2009	Sweden U19	3	(0)
- * Club domestic league appearances and goals

Joakim Daniel Askling (Hebrew: דניאל אסקלינג; born 4 January 1990) is a Swedish former professional footballer who played as a centre-back. Besides Sweden, he played in Italy and Israel.

== Honours ==
- Liga Alef
  - Winner (1): 2013–14
