= Dovev Gabay =

Israeli footballer

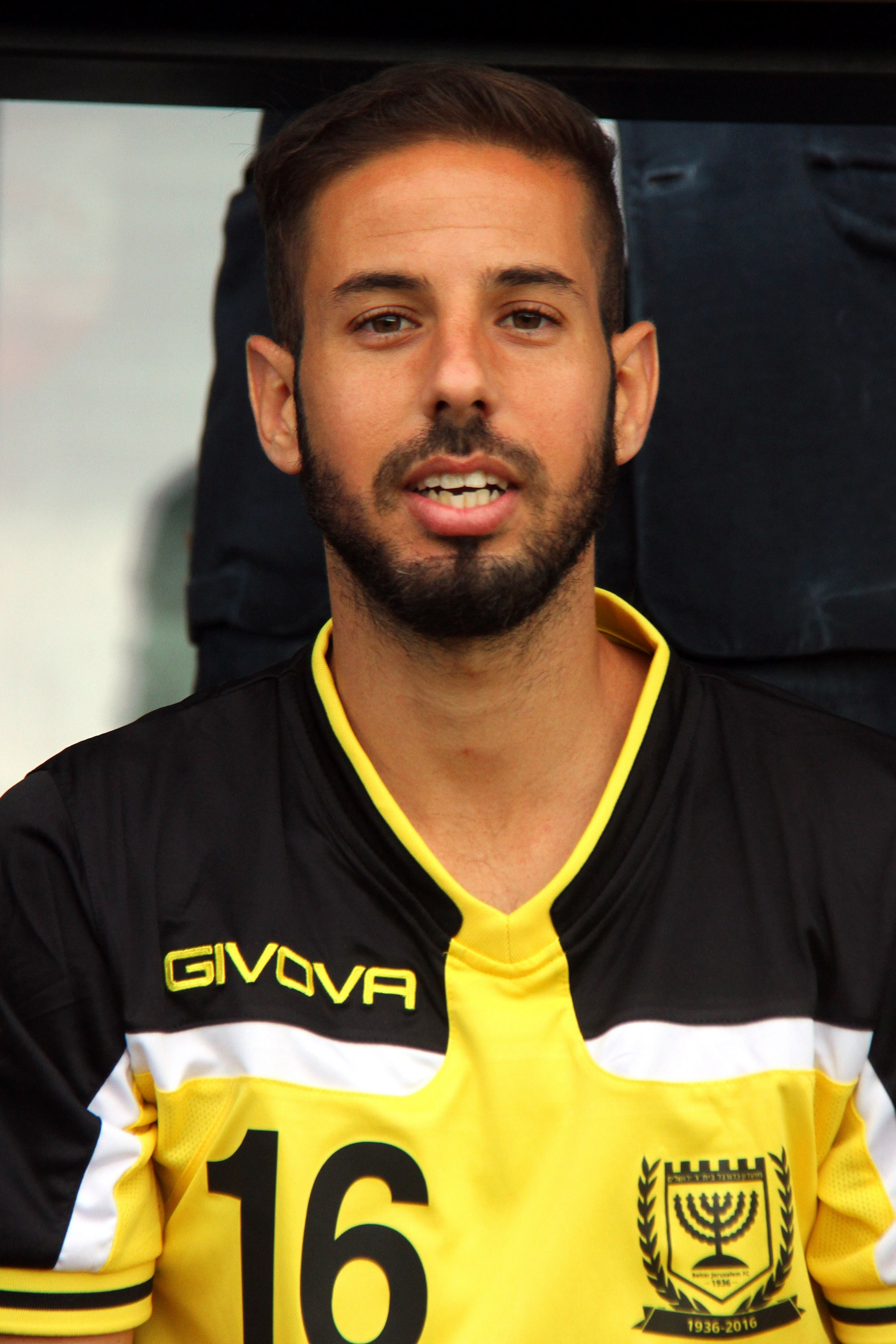
- Dovev Gabay playing for Beitar Jerusalem in 2016

Personal information
- Full name: Dovev Gabay
- Date of birth: 1 April 1987 (age 39)
- Place of birth: Hadera, Israel
- Height: 1.78 m (5 ft 10 in)
- Position: Forward

Team information
- Current team: Maccabi Yavne

Youth career
- Maccabi Petah Tikva

Senior career*
| Years | Team | Apps | (Gls) |
| 2005–2011 | Maccabi Petah Tikva | 71 | (10) |
| 2008–2009 | → Maccabi Herzlilya (loan) | 27 | (10) |
| 2011–2015 | Hapoel Be'er Sheva | 121 | (40) |
| 2015–2016 | Beitar Jerusalem | 29 | (4) |
| 2016–2018 | Bnei Yehuda | 22 | (1) |
| 2017 | → Maccabi Petah Tikva (loan) | 10 | (1) |
| 2018 | → Hapoel Ashkelon (loan) | 12 | (1) |
| 2018–2019 | Hapoel Hadera | 24 | (3) |
| 2019–2021 | Hapoel Umm al-Fahm | 39 | (16) |
| 2021 | Hapoel Nof HaGalil | 15 | (11) |
| 2021–2022 | Maccabi Ahi Nazareth | 19 | (3) |
| 2022–2023 | Maccabi Jaffa | 51 | (24) |
| 2023–2024 | Hapoel Umm al-Fahm | 30 | (10) |
| 2024–2025 | Hapoel Ramat HaSharon | 9 | (4) |
| 2025 | Maccabi Jaffa | 17 | (0) |
| 2025– | Maccabi Yavne | 0 | (0) |
- * Club domestic league appearances and goals as of 15 June 2025

Dovev Gabay (Hebrew: דובב גבאי; born 1 April 1987) is an Israeli footballer who plays as a forward for Maccabi Yavne.
