= Siraj Nassar =

Israeli footballer

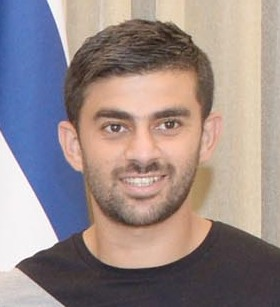

Personal information
- Full name: Siraj Nassar
- Date of birth: 2 September 1990 (age 36)
- Place of birth: Tur'an, Israel
- Position: Attacking midfielder

Team information
- Current team: Hapoel Karmiel

Senior career*
Years	Team	Apps	(Gls)
2007–2009	Maccabi Kafr Kanna	29	(4)
2009–2015	Hapoel Be'er Sheva	164	(21)
2015–2016	Hapoel Tel Aviv	13	(2)
2016–2017	Bnei Sakhnin	29	(0)
2017	Kukësi	0	(0)
2017–2018	Hapoel Acre	23	(1)
2018–2022	Shimshon Kafr Qasim	105	(30)
2022–2023	Hapoel Ra'anana	22	(3)
2023–	Hapoel Karmiel	22	(2)
- * Club domestic league appearances and goals as of 1 June 2023

Siraj Nassar (Arabic: سراج نصار, Hebrew: סיראז' נאסר; born 2 September 1990) is an Israeli footballer who plays for Hapoel Karmiel.
