= 2014–15 Beitar Jerusalem F.C. season =

Beitar Jerusalem
2014–15 season
- Chairman: Eli Tabib
- Manager: Meni Koretski (until 28 January 2015); Guy Levy (from 28 January 2015)
- Ligat Ha'Al: 4th
- State Cup: Round of 32
- Toto Cup: Group stage
- Top goalscorer: League: Itzik Cohen (8); All: Lidor Cohen, Itzik Cohen (8)
- Highest home attendance: 23,000 (rd. 18 vs Hapoel Tel Aviv)
- Lowest home attendance: 3,000 (rd. 29 vs Maccabi Petah Tikva)
Home colours	Away colours

The 2014–15 season is Beitar Jerusalem's 46th season in the Israeli Premier League.

== First team ==
Note: Flags indicate national team as defined under FIFA eligibility rules; some limited exceptions apply. Players may hold more than one non-FIFA nationality.

No.	Pos.	Nation	Player
1	GK	ISR	Boris Klaiman
2	DF	ISR	Eli Dasa
4	DF	ISR	Ze'ev Haimovich
5	DF	ESP	César Arzo
6	DF	ISR	Tal Kachila
7	MF	ISR	Omer Atzili
8	MF	ISR	Shlomi Azulay
9	FW	ISR	Itzik Cohen
10	MF	ISR	Hanan Maman
11	MF	ISR	Dani Preda
12	FW	ISR	Avishay Cohen

No.	Pos.	Nation	Player
14	MF	BRA	Claudemir
15	DF	ISR	Shmulik Malul
17	MF	ISR	Lidor Cohen
18	MF	ISR	Ben Malka
19	FW	ISR	Tomer Swisa
20	MF	ISR	Omer Nachmani
22	GK	ISR	Ben Rahav
23	DF	ISR	Tomer Yerucham
24	MF	ISR	Ofir Kriaf (Captain)
28	MF	ROU	Liviu Antal
81	DF	SRB	Dušan Matović (Vice-captain)

=== Summer transfers ===
Players In
Name	Nat	Pos	Moving from
Boris Klaiman	(Israel)	GK	(Israel) Hapoel Tel Aviv
Ben Rahav	(Israel)	GK	(Israel) Beitar Tel Aviv Ramla
Ze'ev Haimovich	(Israel)	DF	(Israel) Hapoel Tel Aviv
César Arzo	(Spain)	DF	(Spain) Real Zaragoza
Shmulik Malul	(Israel)	DF	(Israel) Maccabi Petah Tikva
Claudemir	(Brazil)	MF	(Portugal) Nacional
Hanan Maman	(Israel)	MF	(Belgium) Waasland-Beveren
Lidor Cohen	(Israel)	MF	(Israel) Maccabi Petah Tikva
Mor Shaked	(Israel)	MF	(Israel) Hapoel Rishon LeZion
Shlomi Azulay	(Israel)	MF	(Israel) Hapoel Rishon LeZion
Omer Nachmani	(Israel)	MF	(Israel) Maccabi Herzliya (loan return)
Žarko Korać	(Montenegro)	FW	(Montenegro) Zeta
Tomer Swisa	(Israel)	FW	(Israel) Hapoel Be'er Sheva
Sani Emmanuel	(Nigeria)	FW	(Italy) Lazio

Players Out
Name	Nat	Pos	Moving to
Ariel Harush	(Israel)	GK	(Israel) Maccabi Netanya
Ohad Saidof	(Israel)	GK	(Israel) Hapoel Katamon Jerusalem
Shai Haddad	(Israel)	DF	End of contract
Nisso Kapiloto	(Israel)	DF	(Switzerland) St. Gallen
Orel Horev	(Israel)	DF	(Israel) Hakoah Amidar Ramat Gan (loan)
Jonathan Vila	(Spain)	MF	(Spain) Celta Vigo (loan return)
Sintayehu Sallalich	(Israel)	MF	(Israel) Maccabi Haifa (loan return)
Aviram Baruchyan	(Israel)	MF	Released
Tzahi Elihen	(Israel)	MF	(Israel) Hakoah Amidar Ramat Gan
Pablo Brandán	(Argentina)	MF	(Romania) Universitatea Craiova
Dor Malul	(Israel)	MF	(Israel) Hapoel Be'er Sheva
Barak Moshe	(Israel)	MF	(Israel) Hapoel Jerusalem
Shlomi Azulay	(Israel)	FW	(Israel) Maccabi Haifa (loan return)
Moshe Lugasi	(Israel)	FW	(Israel) Maccabi Tel Aviv (loan return)
Bryan	(Brazil)	FW	(Israel) Hapoel Ramat Gan Giv'atayim
Roei Zikri	(Israel)	FW	(Israel) Hakoah Amidar Ramat Gan (loan)
Sani Emmanuel	(Nigeria)	FW	Released

=== Winter transfers ===
Players In
Name	Nat	Pos	Moving from
Ben Malka	(Israel)	MF	Free agent
Liviu Antal	(Romania)	MF	(Turkey) Gençlerbirliği

Players Out
Name	Nat	Pos	Moving to
Mor Shaked	(Israel)	MF	(Israel) Hapoel Bnei Lod
Žarko Korać	(Montenegro)	FW	(Israel) Hapoel Haifa

== Pre-season and friendlies ==
10 July 2014	Maccabi Netanya (Israel)	3–3	(Israel) Beitar Jerusalem
	Kayode 16'; Levy 31' (pen.); Abu Abid 87'	Report (Hebrew)	Atzili 72'; Nachmani 80', 90'

14 July 2014	F.C. Ashdod (Israel)	1–2	(Israel) Beitar Jerusalem
18:00 IDT	Eliyahu 79'	Report (Hebrew)	Atzili 17'; Korać 31'

22 July 2014	1. FC Saarbrücken (Germany)	1–1	(Israel) Beitar Jerusalem
18:00 CEST	90'	Report (Hebrew)	A. Cohen 80'

25 July 2014	TuS Koblenz (Germany)	0–2	(Israel) Beitar Jerusalem
Friday 20:00 CEST		Summary; Report (Hebrew)	Atzili 6'; Azulay 77'

1 August 2014	Beitar Tel Aviv Ramla (Israel)	1–1	(Israel) Beitar Jerusalem	Ramla
Friday 10:00 CEST	Avinu 31'	Report (Hebrew)	I. Cohen 30'	Stadium: Ramla Municipal Stadium; Attendance: 100

1 October 2014	Hapoel Ramat HaSharon (Israel)	2–2	(Israel) Beitar Jerusalem	Ramat HaSharon
Wednesday 17:00 IDT	Malul 31' (o.g.); Shivhon 52'	Report (Hebrew)	Sani 36', 54'	Stadium: Grundman Stadium; Referee: Eitan Shmuelevich

8 October 2014	Hapoel Be'er Sheva (Israel)	1–2	(Israel) Beitar Jerusalem	Be'er Sheva
Wednesday 10:30 IDT	Arbeitman 33'	Report (Hebrew)	Maman 38'; Matović 64'	Stadium: Vasermil Stadium; Referee: Shimon Elkabetz

== Ligat Ha'Al (Premier League) ==
=== Fixtures ===
The whole season was postponed due to war

13 September 2014 1	Hapoel Be'er Sheva	1–1	Beitar Jerusalem	Be'er Sheva
Saturday 20:10 IDT	Soares 5'	Summary; Report (Hebrew)	Korać 69' (pen.)	Stadium: Vasermil Stadium; Attendance: 8,600; Referee: Orel Greenfeld

22 September 2014 2	Beitar Jerusalem	1–0	Maccabi Haifa	Jerusalem
Monday 20:50 IDT	Azulay 56'	Summary; Report (Hebrew)	Idrissou (red card) 90+3'	Stadium: Teddy Stadium; Attendance: 22,700; Referee: Liran Liany

27 September 2014 3	Hapoel Ironi Acre	1–1	Beitar Jerusalem	Acre
Saturday 20:10 IDT	Salihi 80'	Summary; Report (Hebrew)	Dasa 8'	Stadium: Acre Municipal Stadium; Attendance: Roi Reinshreiber; Referee: 5,000

19 October 2014 4	Beitar Jerusalem	1–1	F.C. Ashdod	Petah Tikva
Sunday 20:15 IDT	Maman 38'	Summary; Report (Hebrew)	Solari 73'	Stadium: HaMoshava Stadium; Attendance: 8,500; Referee: Guy Berger

27 October 2014 5	Hapoel Tel Aviv	0–2	Beitar Jerusalem	Tel Aviv
Monday 20:50 IST		Summary; Report (Hebrew)	Korać 60'; Maman 71'	Stadium: Bloomfield Stadium; Attendance: 12,689; Referee: Liran Liany

30 October 2014 6	Beitar Jerusalem	1–1	Maccabi Netanya	Jerusalem
Thursday 20:00 IST	Korać 27'	Summary; Report (Hebrew)	Kayode 39'	Stadium: Teddy Stadium; Attendance: 9,760; Referee: Eli Hachmon

3 November 2014 7	Ironi Kiryat Shmona	1–1	Beitar Jerusalem	Kiryat Shmona
Monday 20:00 IST	Abed 55'	Summary; Report (Hebrew)	Maman 39'	Stadium: Kiryat Shmona Municipal Stadium; Attendance: 4,500; Referee: Daniel Bar-Natan

8 November 2014 8	Beitar Jerusalem	0–1	Hapoel Haifa	Jerusalem
Saturday 19:30 IST		Summary; Report (Hebrew)	Lala 90+4'	Stadium: Teddy Stadium; Attendance: 8,000; Referee: Menashe Mashiah

23 November 2014 9	Bnei Sakhnin	1–0	Beitar Jerusalem	Sakhnin
Sunday 19:45 IST	Ryan 39'	Summary; Report (Hebrew)		Stadium: Doha Stadium; Attendance: 5,500; Referee: Alon Yefet

1 December 2014 10	Beitar Jerusalem	2–3	Maccabi Petah Tikva	Jerusalem
Monday 20:00 IST	I. Cohen 35'; Korać 90+3' (pen.)	Summary; Report (Hebrew)	Mununga 3', 33'; Peretz 90'	Stadium: Teddy Stadium; Attendance: 5,000; Referee: Daniel Bar Natan

4 December 2014 11	Beitar Jerusalem	3–1	Hapoel Petah Tikva	Jerusalem
Thursday 20:00 IST	Claudemir 6'; Azulay 35'; Korać 75'	Summary; Report (Hebrew)	Oremuš 36'	Stadium: Teddy Stadium; Attendance: 4,000; Referee: Tzvika Levi

8 December 2014 12	Maccabi Tel Aviv	1–1	Beitar Jerusalem	Haifa
Monday 20:50 IST	Zahavi 61'	Summary; Report (Hebrew)	Atzili 90+3'	Stadium: Sammy Ofer Stadium; Attendance: 30,000; Referee: Erez Papier

15 December 2014 13	Beitar Jerusalem	0–0	Hapoel Ra'anana	Petah Tikva
Monday 20:00 IST		Summary; Report (Hebrew)		Stadium: HaMoshava Stadium; Attendance: 6,400; Referee: Roi Reinshreiber

22 December 2015 14	Beitar Jerusalem	0–3	Hapoel Be'er Sheva	Jerusalem
Monday 20:55 IST		Summary; Report (Hebrew)	Gordana (red card) 45'; Buzaglo 60', 74'; Soares 66'	Stadium: Teddy Stadium; Attendance: 13,000; Referee: Alon Yefet

27 December 2014 15	Maccabi Haifa	1–3	Beitar Jerusalem	Haifa
Saturday 20:00 IST	Boccoli (yellow card) 37' (yellow-red card); Turgeman 75'	Summary; Report (Hebrew)	I. Cohen 82', 86'; Swisa 90+3'	Stadium: Sammy Ofer Stadium; Attendance: 29,130; Referee: Ziv Adler

3 January 2015 16	Beitar Jerusalem	4–0	Hapoel Acre	Jerusalem
Saturday 19:30 IST	Swisa 7'; I. Cohen 23'; Atzili 61'; Azulay 69'	Summary; Report (Hebrew)		Stadium: Teddy Stadium; Attendance: 4,500; Referee: Oren Siminyan

10 January 2015 17	F.C. Ashdod	3–3	Beitar Jerusalem	Ashdod
Saturday 19:45 IST	Davidov 57'; Solari 82'; Ohana 90+3'	Summary; Report (Hebrew)	Azulay 18'; I. Cohen 55'; Atzili 73'	Stadium: Yud-Alef Stadium; Attendance: 3,500; Referee: Menashe Mashiah

19 January 2015 18	Beitar Jerusalem	1–1	Hapoel Tel Aviv	Jerusalem
Monday 20:55 IST	Kachila 70'	Summary; Report (Hebrew)	Safouri 44'	Stadium: Teddy Stadium; Attendance: 23,000; Referee: Eitan Shmuelevitch

26 January 2015 19	Maccabi Netanya	2–0	Beitar Jerusalem	Netanya
Monday 20:15 IST	Rol 41'; Levy 82'	Summary; Report (Hebrew)	I. Cohen (red card) 49'	Stadium: Netanya Stadium; Attendance: 9,700; Referee: Guy Berger

1 February 2015 20	Beitar Jerusalem	3–1	Ironi Kiryat Shmona	Jerusalem
Sunday 20:15 IST	Tzedek 23', 76' (o.g.); Kriaf 90+2'	Summary; Report (Hebrew)	Rochet 27'	Stadium: Teddy Stadium; Attendance: 4,500; Referee: Liran Wachsberger

9 February 2015 21	Hapoel Haifa	3–4	Beitar Jerusalem	Haifa
Monday 20:15 IST	Lala 36', 64'; Ricketts 81'	Summary; Report (Hebrew)	I. Cohen 9'; Antal 44' (pen.); L. Cohen 71', 84'	Stadium: Sammy Ofer Stadium; Attendance: 6,000; Referee: Alon Yefet

15 February 2015 22	Beitar Jerusalem	1–2	Bnei Sakhnin	Jerusalem
Sunday 20:15 IST	Maman 85'	Summary; Report (Hebrew)	Ghadir 25', 55'	Stadium: Teddy Stadium; Attendance: 0 Referee: Menashe Mashiah

22 February 2015 23	Maccabi Petah Tikva	1–1	Beitar Jerusalem	Petah Tikva
Sunday 20:30 IST	Mununga 64'; Dimov (yellow card) 45' (yellow-red card) 81'	Summary; Report (Hebrew)	Dasa 59'	Stadium: HaMoshava Stadium; Attendance: 4,000; Referee: Eli Hachmon

28 February 2015 24	Hapoel Petah Tikva	0–1	Beitar Jerusalem	Petah Tikva
Saturday 19:30 IST		Summary; Report (Hebrew)	Atzili 23'	Stadium: HaMoshava Stadium; Attendance: 6,800; Referee: Guy Berger

9 March 2015 25	Beitar Jerusalem	1–0	Maccabi Tel Aviv	Haifa
Monday 20:55 IST	Atzili 44'	Summary; Report (Hebrew)		Stadium: Sammy Ofer Stadium; Attendance: 17,200; Referee: Menashe Mashiah

14 March 2015 26	Hapoel Ra'anana	0–2	Beitar Jerusalem	Netanya
Saturday 19:30 IST		Summary; Report (Hebrew)	Claudemir 20'; L. Cohen 86'	Stadium: Netanya Stadium; Attendance: 5,800; Referee: Orel Greenfeld

1. Beitar Jerusalem hosted round 4 outside Jerusalem due to reseeding of the grass at Teddy Stadium.
2. Maccabi Tel Aviv hosted round 12 outside Tel Aviv due to their fan's violence during the Tel Aviv derby.
3. Beitar Jerusalem hosted round 13 outside Jerusalem as a punishment for racial slurs by their fans in the match against Bnei Sakhnin.
4. Beitar Jerusalem played round 22 with no crowd and hosted round 25 outside Jerusalem as a punishment for racial slurs by their fans against Eyad Abu Abaid of Maccabi Netanya.

==== League table ====
Pos	Team	Pld	W	D	L	GF	GA	GD	Pts	Qualification
2	Hapoel Be'er Sheva	26	14	7	5	47	24	+23	49	Qualification for the championship round
3	Ironi Kiryat Shmona	26	13	8	5	40	27	+13	47	Qualification for the championship round
4	Beitar Jerusalem	26	10	10	6	38	29	+9	40	Qualification for the championship round
5	Maccabi Petah Tikva	26	10	9	7	28	30	−2	39	Qualification for the championship round
6	Maccabi Haifa	26	11	4	11	38	29	+9	37	Qualification for the championship round

Source: Israel Football Association
Rules for classification: 1) Points; 2) Goal difference; 3) Matches won; 4) Goals scored; 5) Head-to-head points; 6) Head-to-head goal difference; 7) Head-to-head goals scored; 8) Play-off.

==== Results summary ====
Overall								Home						Away					
Pld	W	D	L	GF	GA	GD	Pts	W	D	L	GF	GA	GD	W	D	L	GF	GA	GD
26	10	10	6	38	29	+9	40	5	4	4	18	14	+4	5	6	2	20	15	+5

Last updated: 15 March 2015.
Source: Competitive matches

=== Top playoff ===
22 March 2015 27	Ironi Kiryat Shmona	1–2	Beitar Jerusalem	Kiryat Shmona
Sunday 20:15 IST	Kahat 77'	Summary; Report (Hebrew)	Antal 17', 27'	Stadium: Kiryat Shmona Municipal Stadium; Attendance: 2,800; Referee: Roi Reinshreiber

5 April 2015 28	Maccabi Haifa	1–0	Beitar Jerusalem	Haifa
Sunday 20:15 IDT	Benayoun 44'	Summary; Report (Hebrew)		Stadium: Sammy Ofer Stadium; Attendance: 30,000; Referee: Daniel Bar Natan

12 April 2015 29	Beitar Jerusalem	0–0	Maccabi Petah Tikva	Netanya
Sunday 20:15 IDT		Summary; Report (Hebrew)		Stadium: Netanya Stadium; Attendance: 3,000; Referee: Guy Berger

19 April 2015 30	Maccabi Tel Aviv	4–1	Beitar Jerusalem	Tel Aviv
Sunday 20:15 IDT	Micha 56', 71'; Prica 68'; Zahavi 81'	Summary; Report (Hebrew)	I. Cohen 57'; Malul (red card) 80'	Stadium: Bloomfield Stadium; Attendance: 12,536; Referee: Alon Yefet

26 April 2015 31	Beitar Jerusalem	1–1	Hapoel Be'er Sheva	Petah Tikva
Sunday 20:55 IDT	Kriaf 1'	Summary; Report (Hebrew)	Barda 77'	Stadium: HaMoshava Stadium; Attendance: 6,500; Referee: Erez Papier

2 May 2015 32	Beitar Jerusalem	0–1	Ironi Kiryat Shmona	Jerusalem
Saturday 20:00 IDT		Summary; Report (Hebrew)	Abed 83'	Stadium: Teddy Stadium; Attendance: 5,000; Referee: Oren Siminyan

10 May 2015 33	Beitar Jerusalem	1–1	Maccabi Haifa	Jerusalem
Sunday 20:30 IDT	L. Cohen 17'	Summary; Report (Hebrew)	Amasha 63'	Stadium: Teddy Stadium; Attendance: 12,000; Referee: Orel Greenfeld

18 May 2015 34	Maccabi Petah Tikva	1–2	Beitar Jerusalem	Petah Tikva
Monday 20:30 IDT	Kabha 85'	Summary; Report (Hebrew)	L. Cohen 15'; Atzili 84'	Stadium: HaMoshava Stadium; Attendance: 5,000; Referee: Eitan Shmuelevich

25 May 2015 35	Beitar Jerusalem	3–0	Maccabi Tel Aviv	Jerusalem
Monday 20:55 IDT	L. Cohen 5'; Maman 36'; I. Cohen 90'	Summary; Report {Hebrew)		Stadium: Teddy Stadium; Attendance: 12,000; Referee: Erez Papier

31 May 2015 36	Hapoel Be'er Sheva	4–0	Beitar Jerusalem	Be'er Sheva
Sunday 18:40 IDT	Soares 32'; Gabay 41' (pen.); Melikson 56'; Gordana 64'	Summary; Report (Hebrew)		Stadium: Vasermil Stadium; Attendance: 4,800; Referee: Gal Laibuwitz

1. Beitar Jerusalem will host rounds 29 & 31 outside Jerusalem as a punishment for racial slurs by their fans against Ahmed Abed of Ironi Kiryat Shmona.

==== Table ====
Pos	Team	Pld	W	D	L	GF	GA	GD	Pts	Qualification
1	Maccabi Tel Aviv (Note: Maccabi Tel Aviv and Beitar Jerusalem each deducted one point.) (C)	36	21	9	6	67	32	+35	70	Qualification for the Champions League second qualifying round
2	Ironi Kiryat Shmona	36	18	10	8	53	38	+15	64	Qualification for the Europa League third qualifying round (Note: Since Maccabi Tel Aviv won the 2014–15 Israel State Cup, then the 2nd-positioned team will be awarded with entry to the third qualifying round of the UEFA Europa League.)
3	Hapoel Be'er Sheva	36	17	11	8	63	40	+23	62	Qualification for the Europa League second qualifying round
4	Beitar Jerusalem	36	13	13	10	48	43	+5	51	Qualification for the Europa League first qualifying round
5	Maccabi Haifa	36	14	8	14	51	37	+14	50	
6	Maccabi Petah Tikva	36	12	12	12	34	41	−7	48	

Source: Israel Football Association
Rules for classification: 1) Points; 2) Goal difference; 3) Matches won; 4) Goals scored; 5) Head-to-head points; 6) Head-to-head goal difference; 7) Head-to-head goals scored; 8) Play-off.
(C) Champions

==== Results summary ====
Overall								Home						Away					
Pld	W	D	L	GF	GA	GD	Pts	W	D	L	GF	GA	GD	W	D	L	GF	GA	GD
36	13	13	10	48	43	+5	52	6	7	5	23	17	+6	7	6	5	25	26	−1

Last updated: 31 May 2015.
Source: Competitive matches

=== Results by round ===
Round	1	2	3	4	5	6	7	8	9	10	11	12	13	14	15	16	17	18	19	20	21	22	23	24	25	26	27	28	29	30	31	32	33	34	35	36
Ground	A	H	A	H	A	H	A	H	A	H	H	A	H	H	A	H	A	H	A	H	A	H	A	A	H	A	A	A	H	A	H	H	H	A	H	A
Result	D	W	D	D	W	D	D	L	L	L	W	D	D	L	W	W	D	D	L	W	W	L	D	W	W	W	W	D	L	L	D	L	D	W	W	L
Position	5	5	7	7	4	4	4	4	6	8	8	8	6	6	5	4	4	4	4	4	4	5	5	5	4	4	4	4	4	4	4	4	5 (Note: Beitar were deducted 2 points after racist calls by their fans during the round 32 match.)		4	4

Updated to match(es) played on 31 May 2015. Source: Competitive matches
A = Away; H = Home; W = Win; D = Draw; L = Loss

=== League goalscorers per round ===
Total	Player		Goals per Round																																			
Total	Player		1	2	3	4	5	6	7	8	9	10	11	12	13	14	15	16	17	18	19	20	21	22	23	24	25	26	27	28	29	30	31	32	33	34	35	36
8	(Israel)	Itzik Cohen										1					2	1	1				1									1					1	
6	(Israel)	Omer Atzili												1				1	1							1	1									1		
6	(Israel)	Lidor Cohen																					2					1							1	1	1	
5	(Montenegro)	Žarko Korać	1				1	1				1	1																									
5	(Israel)	Hanan Maman				1	1		1															1													1	
4	(Israel)	Shlomi Azulay		1									1					1	1																			
3	(Romania)	Liviu Antal																					1						2									
2	(Israel)	Tomer Swisa															1	1																				
2	(Israel)	Eli Dasa			1																				1													
2	(Brazil)	Claudemir											1															1										
2	(Israel)	Ofir Kriaf																				1											1					
2	Goal	Own goal																				2																
1	(Israel)	Tal Kachila																		1																		
48	TOTAL		1	1	1	1	2	1	1	0	0	2	3	1	0	0	3	4	3	1	0	3	4	1	1	1	1	2	2	0	0	1	1	0	1	2	3	0

== State Cup ==
=== Fixtures ===
15 January 2015 Round of 32	Hapoel Ashkelon	3–3 (a.e.t.) (3–1 p)	Beitar Jerusalem	Ashkelon
21:00 IST	Revivo 25' (pen.); Asulin 78'; Dego 108'	Summary; Report (Hebrew)	Matović 38'; Claudemir 52'; Azulay 113'	Stadium: Sala Stadium; Referee: Eli Hachmon
	Penalties
	Ben Hemo (penalty scored); Gormazno (penalty scored); A. Buzaglo (penalty scored)		(penalty missed) Claudemir; (penalty missed) Atzili; (penalty scored) Azulay; (penalty missed) I. Cohen

=== Goalscorers ===
1 goal

- (Israel) Shlomi Azulay
- (Brazil) Claudemir Ferreira da Silva
- (Serbia) Dušan Matović

== Toto Cup ==
=== Group stage ===
Pos	Team	Pld	W	D	L	GF	GA	GD	Pts
1	Hapoel Petah Tikva (A)	4	2	1	1	7	3	+4	7
2	F.C. Ironi Ashdod (A)	4	2	1	1	5	5	0	7
3	Maccabi Petah Tikva (A)	4	1	2	1	1	3	−2	5
4	Beitar Jerusalem	4	1	1	2	4	3	+1	4
5	Hapoel Be'er Sheva	4	0	3	1	2	5	−3	3

Source: football.org.il (in Hebrew)
Rules for classification: 1st points; 2nd goal difference; 3rd matches won; 4th goals scored; 5th head-to-head; 6th decision match
(A) Advanced to the quarterfinals

13 August 2014 1	Beitar Jerusalem	1–2	Hapoel Petah Tikva	Rishon LeZion
Wednesday 20:40 IDT	Haimovich 40'	Summary; Report (Hebrew)	Peso 21'; Asulin 36'	Stadium: Haberfeld Stadium; Attendance: 2,000; Referee: Eli Hachmon

30 August 2014; Postponed due to war 2	Hapoel Be'er Sheva	0–3	Beitar Jerusalem	Be'er Sheva
Saturday 20:00 IDT		Summary; Report (Hebrew)	L. Cohen 10', 14'; Atzili 82'	Stadium: Vasermil Stadium; Attendance: 5,500; Referee: Ziv Adler

27 August 2014 3	Beitar Jerusalem	0–0	Maccabi Petah Tikva	Afula
Wednesday 19:35 IDT		Summary; Report (Hebrew)		Stadium: Afula Illit Stadium; Attendance: 1,500; Referee: Liran Wachsberger

2 September 2014 4	F.C. Ashdod	1–0	Beitar Jerusalem	Ashdod
Tuesday 20:30 IDT	Zrihan 73'	Summary; Report (Hebrew)		Stadium: Yud-Alef Stadium; Referee: Daniel Bar-Natan

1. Beitar Jerusalem hosted their first home matches of the season outside Jerusalem due to renovation of Teddy Stadium.

=== Goalscorers ===
2 goals

- (Israel) Lidor Cohen

1 goal

- (Israel) Omer Atzili
- (Israel) Ze'ev Haimovich
