= List of Israeli football transfers summer 2015 =

This is a list of Israeli football transfers for the 2015 Summer Transfer Window

== Ligat Ha'Al ==
=== Beitar Jerusalem ===
In:

No.	Pos.	Nation	Player
—	DF	ISR	Uri Magbo (from (Israel) Beitar Tel Aviv Ramla)
—	DF	ISR	Daniel Askling (from (Israel) Beitar Tel Aviv Ramla)
—	DF	ESP	Jesús Rueda (from (Spain) Real Valladolid)
—	DF	ISR	Nisso Kapiloto (from (Switzerland) St. Gallen)
—	DF	ISR	Snir Mishan (from (Israel) Hapoel Acre)
—	DF	ISR	Elad Gabai (from (Israel) Maccabi Haifa)
—	MF	ISR	Ness Zamir (from (Israel) Bnei Yehuda)
—	MF	ISR	Liroy Zhairi (from (Israel) Hapoel Petah Tikva)
—	MF	ESP	Pablo de Lucas (from (Romania) Petrolul Ploiești)
—	FW	ISR	Dovev Gabay (from (Israel) Hapoel Be'er Sheva)
—	FW	AUS	Nikita Rukavytsya (from (Australia) Western Sydney Wanderers)

Out:

No.	Pos.	Nation	Player
—	GK	ISR	Ben Rahav (to (Israel) Hapoel Kfar Saba)
—	DF	ISR	Ze'ev Haimovich (to (Israel) Maccabi Netanya)
—	DF	ESP	Cesar Arzo (to (Greece) AEK Athens)
—	DF	ISR	Eli Dasa (to (Israel) Maccabi Tel Aviv)
—	DF	ISR	Shmulik Malul (to (Israel) Hapoel Acre)
—	MF	ISR	Shlomi Azulay (to (Israel) Maccabi Tel Aviv)
—	MF	ISR	Hanan Maman (to (Israel) Hapoel Haifa)
—	MF	ISR	Ben Malka (to (Israel) Hapoel Petah Tikva)
—	MF	ISR	Ofir Kriaf (to (Israel) Maccabi Haifa)
—	FW	ROU	Liviu Antal (loan return to (Turkey) Gençlerbirliği)

=== Bnei Sakhnin ===
In:

No.	Pos.	Nation	Player
—	DF	ESP	Abraham Paz (loan return from (Israel) Maccabi Haifa)
—	DF	ISR	Obieda Khateb (from (Israel) Hapoel Tel Aviv)
—	MF	BIH	Eldar Hasanović (from (Bosnia and Herzegovina) FK Željezničar)
—	MF	ISR	Sfouan Zuabi (from (Israel) Hapoel Rishon LeZion)
—	MF	ISR	Tzahi Elihen (from (Israel) Hakoah Amidar Ramat Gan)
—	MF	BRA	Georginho (from (Brazil) Capivariano)
—	FW	ISR	Weaam Amasha (from (Israel) Maccabi Haifa)
—	FW	ISR	Shlomi Azulay (from (Israel) Hapoel Tel Aviv)

Out:

No.	Pos.	Nation	Player
—	DF	ISR	Ayid Habshi (loan return to (Israel) Maccabi Haifa)
—	MF	ISR	Ataa Jaber (loan return to (Israel) Maccabi Haifa)
—	MF	ISR	Ismaeel Ryan (loan return to (Israel) Maccabi Haifa)
—	FW	ISR	Mohammed Kalibat (loan return to (Israel) Maccabi Haifa)
—	FW	ISR	Yosef Abu Laben (loan return to (Israel) Hapoel Be'er Sheva)
—	FW	ISR	Mohammad Ghadir (loan return to (Israel) Maccabi Haifa)

=== Bnei Yehuda ===
In:

No.	Pos.	Nation	Player
—	GK	ISR	Itamar Israeli (loan return from (Israel) Hapoel Morasha Ramat HaSharon)
—	DF	ISR	Sean Goldberg (from (Israel) Hapoel Tel Aviv)
—	DF	ISR	Sari Falah (from (Israel) Hapoel Tel Aviv)
—	MF	ISR	Almog Buzaglo (from (Israel) Hapoel Ramat Gan)
—	MF	ISR	Raz Meir (on loan from (Israel) Maccabi Haifa)
—	MF	CIV	Thierry Doubai (from (Switzerland) FC Luzern)

Out:

No.	Pos.	Nation	Player
—	GK	ISR	Dor Davidi (to (Israel) Hapoel Kfar Shalem)
—	DF	ISR	Oz Raly (on loan to (Israel) Maccabi Tel Aviv)
—	DF	ISR	Maor Kandil (lon return from (Israel) Hapoel Nir Ramat HaSharon)
—	MF	ISR	Ness Zamir (to (Israel) Beitar Jerusalem)

=== Hapoel Acre ===
In:

No.	Pos.	Nation	Player
—	GK	ISR	Danny Amos (Free transfer)
—	GK	ISR	Rom Iluz (from (Israel) Hapoel Ironi Kiryat Shmona)
—	DF	MNE	Boris Kopitović (from (Montenegro) Budućnost Podgorica)
—	DF	ISR	Shmulik Malul (from (Israel) Beitar Jerusalem)
—	DF	ISR	Lior Levi (from (Israel) Hapoel Tel Aviv)
—	DF	ISR	Niv Serdal (on loan from (Israel) Hapoel Haifa)
—	MF	ISR	Bar Avitan (from (Israel) Maccabi Ahi Nazareth)
—	MF	ISR	Dor Kochav (on loan from (Israel) Maccabi Haifa)
—	MF	BIH	Adnan Zahirović (from (Germany) Vfl Bochum)
—	FW	ISR	Shon Weissman (on loan from (Israel) Maccabi Haifa)
—	FW	NGR	Samuel Gilmore (from (Nigeria) Magic)
—	FW	ISR	Dor Jan (on loan from (Israel) Maccabi Tel Aviv)

Out:

No.	Pos.	Nation	Player
—	GK	ISR	David Goresh (to (Israel) Hapoel Be'er Sheva)
—	DF	ISR	Daniel Borchal (to (Israel) Hapoel Ironi Kiryat Shmona)
—	DF	ISR	Adi Gotlieb (to (Israel) Hapoel Tel Aviv)
—	DF	ISR	Snir Mishan (to (Israel) Beitar Jerusalem)
—	MF	ISR	Guy Dayan (to (Israel) Hapoel Afula)
—	MF	ISR	Yossi Dora (to (Israel) Hapoel Haifa)
—	MF	GRE	Yiannis Papadopoulos (to (Israel) Hapoel Kfar Saba)
—	MF	ISR	Amiya Taga (to (Israel) Maccabi Netanya)
—	MF	ISR	Eli Zizov (to (Israel) Maccabi Kiryat Gat)
—	FW	ISR	Yuval Avidor (to (Israel) Maccabi Netanya)

=== Hapoel Be'er Sheva ===
In:

No.	Pos.	Nation	Player
—	GK	ISR	David Goresh (from (Israel) Hapoel Acre)
—	DF	ISR	Matan Ohayon (from (Israel) Hapoel Tel Aviv)
—	DF	ISR	Shir Tzedek (from (Israel) Hapoel Kiryat Shmona)
—	DF	ISR	Ben Turjeman (loan return from (Israel) Hapoel Petah Tikva)
—	MF	ISR	Maharan Radi (from (Israel) Maccabi Tel Aviv)
—	FW	NGR	Anthony Nwakaeme (from (Israel) Hapoel Ra'anana)
—	FW	ISR	Ben Sahar (from (Netherlands) Willem II)

Out:

No.	Pos.	Nation	Player
—	DF	SRB	Tomislav Pajović (to (Hungary) Vasas)
—	DF	ISR	Dudu Twito (on loan to (Israel) Maccabi Petah Tikva)
—	DF	ISR	Ben Grabli (to (Israel) Hapoel Tel Aviv)
—	FW	ISR	Yosef Abu Laben (to (Israel) Hapoel Ra'anana)
—	FW	ISR	Dovev Gabay (to (Israel) Beitar Jerusalem)
—	FW	ISR	Tomer Swisa (to (Israel) Hapoel Haifa)
—	FW	ISR	Siraj Nassar (to (Israel) Hapoel Tel Aviv)

=== Hapoel Haifa ===
In:

No.	Pos.	Nation	Player
—	DF	ISR	Miki Yazo (from (Israel) Ironi Tiberias)
—	MF	ISR	Ali Khatib (from (Israel) Maccabi Nazareth)
—	MF	ISR	Anas Dabour (from (Israel) Maccabi Nazareth)
—	MF	POR	Bruno Pinheiro (from (Cyprus) Apollon Smyrnis)
—	MF	ISR	Yossi Dora (from (Israel) Hapoel Acre)
—	MF	ISR	Ahad Azam (from (Israel) Hapoel Ironi Kiryat Shmona)
—	MF	ISR	Hanan Maman (from (Israel) Beitar Jerusalem)
—	MF	ISR	Adrian Rochet (from (Israel) Hapoel Ironi Kiryat Shmona)
—	FW	ISR	Tomer Swisa (from (Israel) Hapoel Be'er Sheva)

Out:

No.	Pos.	Nation	Player
—	DF	ISR	Oren Biton (on loan to (Israel) Hapoel Nazareth Illit)
—	DF	ISR	Niv Serdal (on loan to (Israel) Hapoel Acre)
—	DF	ISR	Or Lagrisi (on loan to (Israel) Hapoel Jerusalem)
—	MF	ISR	Roei Shukrani (to (Israel) Hapoel Kiryat Shmona)
—	MF	ISR	Or Ostvind (to (Israel) Hapoel Kiryat Shmona)
—	MF	ISR	Kobi Dajani (to (Israel) Ashdod)
—	FW	ALB	Hamdi Salihi (to (Albania) Skënderbeu Korçë)
—	MF	ISR	Yuval Shabtay (to (Israel) Hapoel Ra'anana)
—	FW	ISR	Tosaint Ricketts (to (Turkey) Boluspor)

=== Hapoel Ironi Kiryat Shmona ===
In:

No.	Pos.	Nation	Player
—	DF	BOL	Luis Gutiérrez (from (Bolivia) Bolívar)
—	DF	ISR	Daniel Borchal (from (Israel) Hapoel Acre)
—	DF	ISR	Eli Balilty (loan return from (Israel) Hapoel Afula)
—	MF	ISR	Or Ostvind (from (Israel) Hapoel Haifa)
—	MF	ISR	Roei Shukrani (from (Israel) Hapoel Haifa)
—	FW	BRA	Bruno Cunha (from (Brazil) Sao Paulo)
—	FW	ISR	Ido Exbard (from (Israel) Maccabi Ahi Nazareth)

Out:

No.	Pos.	Nation	Player
—	GK	ISR	Rom Iluz (to (Israel) Hapoel Acre)
—	DF	ISR	Shir Tzedek (to (Israel) Hapoel Be'er Sheva)
—	DF	SUR	Touvarno Pinas (Free agent)
—	MF	ISR	Roi Kahat (to Austria Wien)
—	MF	LTU	Mindaugas Panka (to (Israel) Maccabi Petah Tikva)
—	FW	ISR	Karem Arshid (to (Israel) F.C. Julis)
—	FW	ISR	Amit Mizrahi (to (Israel) Hapoel Afula)

=== Hapoel Kfar Saba ===
In:

No.	Pos.	Nation	Player
—	GK	ISR	Ben Rahav (from (Israel) Beitar Jerusalem)
—	DF	ISR	Ori Shitrit (from (Israel) Maccabi Netanya)
—	DF	CRO	Dino Škvorc (from (Romania) Universitatea Cluj)
—	MF	GRE	Yiannis Papadopoulos (from (Israel) Hapoel Acre)
—	MF	ESP	Hugo López (from (Cyprus) Apollon Limassol)
—	FW	CGO	Mavis Tchibota (on loan from (Israel) Maccabi Tel Aviv)
—	FW	NGR	Lanry Kahinda (on loan from (Israel) Maccabi Tel Aviv)

Out:

No.	Pos.	Nation	Player
—	MF	ISR	Samir Abd-Alhi (to (Israel) Hapoel Herzliya)
—	FW	ISR	Ben Ben Shushan (to (Israel) Ironi Nesher)
—	FW	SRB	Branko Mihajlović (to (Israel) Hapoel Petah Tikva)

=== Hapoel Ra'anana ===
In:

No.	Pos.	Nation	Player
—	GK	ISR	Matan Zalmanovic (from (Israel) Hakoah Amidar Ramat Gan)
—	DF	ISR	Ido Levy (from (Israel) Maccabi Netanya)
—	DF	ISR	David Tiram (from (Israel) Maccabi Netanya)
—	DF	ISR	Ahmed Shaban (from (Israel) Hapoel Bnei Lod)
—	MF	ISR	Yuval Shabtay (from (Israel) Hapoel Haifa)
—	MF	SLO	Rene Mihelič (from (Hungary) Debrecen)
—	FW	ISR	Karem Arshid (on loan from (Israel) F.C. Julis)
—	FW	ISR	Yosef Abu Laben (from (Israel) Hapoel Be'er Sheva)
—	FW	ISR	Roi Atar (from (Israel) Hapoel Nir Ramat HaSharon)
—	FW	ISR	Barak Badash (from (Israel) Maccabi Tel Aviv)

Out:

No.	Pos.	Nation	Player
—	GK	ISR	Daniel Lifshitz (on loan to (Israel) Maccabi Tel Aviv)
—	DF	ISR	Yakir Shina (to (Israel) Hapoel Bnei Lod)
—	DF	ISR	Yogev Lerman (to (Israel) Hapoel Katamon Jerusalem)
—	DF	ISR	Wesam Rabah (to (Israel) Maccabi Ahi Nazareth)
—	MF	ISR	Dela Yampolsky (to (Israel) Hapoel Bnei Lod)
—	MF	ISR	Gil Blumstein (to (Israel) Beitar Tel Aviv Ramla)
—	FW	NGR	Anthony Nwakaeme (to (Israel) Hapoel Be'er Sheva)

=== Hapoel Tel Aviv ===
In:

No.	Pos.	Nation	Player
—	GK	ISR	Ariel Harush (from (Israel) Maccabi Netanya)
—	GK	ISR	Tzlil Hatuka (from (Israel) Hapoel Bnei Lod)
—	GK	ISR	Ram Strauss (from (Cyprus) Nea Salamis Famagusta)
—	DF	ISR	Ofer Verta (from (Israel) F.C. Ashdod)
—	DF	ISR	Samuel Scheimann (from (Israel) Maccabi Haifa)
—	DF	ISR	Adi Gotlieb (from (Israel) Hapoel Acre)
—	DF	ISR	Ben Grabli (from (Israel) Hapoel Be'er Sheva)
—	DF	ISR	Eyad Abu Abaid (from (Israel) Maccabi Netanya)
—	DF	ISR	Guy Gomberg (from (Israel) Hapoel Rishon LeZion)
—	DF	GRE	Loukas Vyntra (from (Spain) Levante)
—	MF	ISR	Omri Shekel (from (Israel) Hapoel Rishon LeZion)
—	MF	CIV	Issoumaila Lingane (from (Israel) Hapoel Ramat Gan)
—	MF	ROU	Claudiu Bumba (from (Romania) Târgu Mureș)
—	MF	ROU	Mihai Pintilii (from (Saudi Arabia) Al-Hilal)
—	MF	ISR	Omri Altman (from (Israel) Maccabi Tel Aviv)
—	FW	ROU	Liviu Antal (from (Turkey) Gençlerbirliği)

Out:

No.	Pos.	Nation	Player
—	DF	ISR	Matan Ohayon (to (Israel) Hapoel Be'er Sheva)
—	DF	NED	Jurgen Colin (to (Israel) Hapoel Ashkelon)
—	DF	ISR	Lior Levi (to (Israel) Hapoel Acre)
—	DF	ISR	Idan Cohen (on loan to (Israel) Hapoel Rishon LeZion)
—	DF	ISR	Lidor Lazar (on loan to (Israel) Sektzia Nes Tziona)
—	DF	ISR	Mor Pahima (on loan to (Israel) Ironi Kiryat Gat)
—	MF	ISR	Aviv Dado (on loan to (Israel) Hapoel Rishon LeZion)
—	MF	ISR	Guy Hadida (on loan to (Israel) Hapoel Nir Ramat HaSharon)
—	MF	ISR	Ariel Lazmi (on loan to (Israel) Hapoel Rishon LeZion)
—	MF	ISR	Israel Zaguri (on loan to (Israel) Maccabi Netanya)
—	MF	ISR	Shay Abutbul (Free agent)
—	MF	BRA	Lucas Sasha (to (Bulgaria) Ludogorets Razgrad)
—	FW	GBS	Amido Baldé (to (France) Metz)

=== Maccabi Haifa ===
In:

No.	Pos.	Nation	Player
—	GK	ISR	Gil Ofek (from (Israel) Hapoel Beit She'an)
—	DF	ISR	Sun Menahem (from (Israel) Hapoel Nir Ramat HaSharon)
—	DF	ISR	Ayid Habshi (loan return to (Israel) Bnei Sakhnin)
—	DF	ISR	Yuval Yosipovich (loan return to (Israel) Hapoel Afula)
—	DF	ESP	Marc Valiente (from (Spain) Real Valladolid)
—	MF	MNE	Nikola Drinčić (from (Serbia) Partizan)
—	MF	ISR	Ataa Jaber (loan return to (Israel) Bnei Sakhnin)
—	MF	ISR	Ismaeel Ryan (loan return to (Israel) Bnei Sakhnin)
—	MF	ISR	Ofir Kriaf (from (Israel) Beitar Jerusalem)
—	FW	ISR	Shahar Hirsh (loan return from (Israel) Hapoel Petah Tikva)
—	FW	ISR	Shoval Gozlan (loan return from (Israel) Hapoel Ra'anana)
—	FW	ISR	Mohammed Kalibat (on loan to (Israel) Maccabi Petah Tikva)
—	FW	NED	Glynor Plet (from (Belgium) Zulte Waregem)

Out:

No.	Pos.	Nation	Player
—	GK	ISR	Amir Edri (Free agent)
—	GK	ISR	Tal Bomstein (on loan to (Israel) Ironi Nesher)
—	DF	ESP	Abraham Paz (loan return to (Israel) Bnei Sakhnin)
—	DF	ISR	Samuel Scheimann (to (Israel) Hapoel Tel Aviv)
—	DF	ISR	Elad Gabai (to (Israel) Beitar Jerusalem)
—	DF	ISR	Alaa Jaffar (on loan to (Israel) Hapoel Acre)
—	MF	ISR	Idan Vered (to (Serbia) Red Star Belgrade)
—	MF	ESP	Míchel (to (Azerbaijan) Qarabağ)
—	MF	ISR	Gustavo Boccoli (Retired)
—	MF	ESP	Rubén Rayos (to (France) FC Sochaux-Montbéliard)
—	FW	ISR	Mohammad Ghadir (to (Belgium) Lokeren)
—	FW	ISR	Weaam Amasha (to (Israel) Bnei Sakhnin)
—	FW	ISR	Shon Weissman (on loan to (Israel) Hapoel Acre)

=== Maccabi Petah Tikva ===
In:

No.	Pos.	Nation	Player
—	DF	FRA	Xavier Tomas (from (Greece) Levadiakos)
—	DF	ISR	Dudu Twito (on loan from (Israel) Hapoel Be'er Sheva)
—	DF	BRA	Allyson (from (Brazil) Independente)
—	MF	LTU	Mindaugas Panka (from (Israel) Hapoel Kiryat Shmona)
—	MF	ESP	Aitor Monroy (from (Moldova) Sheriff)
—	MF	ISR	Mor Shaked (from (Israel) Hapoel Bnei Lod)
—	FW	ISR	Dor Hugi (on loan from (Israel) Maccabi Haifa)
—	FW	ISR	Guy Melamed (loan return to (Israel) Maccabi Herzliya)
—	FW	ISR	Mohammed Kalibat (on loan from (Israel) Maccabi Haifa)

Out:

No.	Pos.	Nation	Player
—	MF	ISR	Marwan Kabha (to (Slovenia) Maribor)

=== Maccabi Netanya ===
In:

No.	Pos.	Nation	Player
—	GK	ISR	Barak Levi (on loan from (Israel) Maccabi Tel Aviv)
—	DF	UKR	Andriy Mischenko (from (Ukraine) FC Olimpik Donetsk)
—	DF	ISR	Omer Vered (from (Israel) Hapoel Haifa)
—	MF	ISR	Moshe Lugasi (on loan from (Israel) Maccabi Tel Aviv)
—	MF	ISR	Tal Ayela (from (Israel) Maccabi Kiryat Gat)
—	MF	GAM	Hamza Barry (on loan from (Cyprus) Apollon Limassol)
—	FW	ISR	Omer Buaron (from (Israel) Hapoel Beit She'an)
—	FW	ISR	Shalom Edri (from (Israel) Hapoel Nir Ramat HaSharon)
—	FW	GAM	Momodou Ceesay (from (Kazakhstan) FC Kairat)

Out:

No.	Pos.	Nation	Player
—	GK	ISR	Ariel Harush (to (Israel) Hapoel Tel Aviv)
—	DF	ISR	Eyad Abu Abaid (to (Israel) Hapoel Tel Aviv)
—	DF	ISR	Ido Levy (to (Israel) Hapoel Ra'anana)
—	DF	ISR	David Tiram (to (Israel) Hapoel Ra'anana)
—	DF	ROU	Cristian Sîrghi (to (Romania) Concordia Chiajna)
—	MF	ROU	Gabriel Giurgiu (to (Romania) CS Concordia Chiajna)
—	FW	NGR	Olarenwaju Kayode (to Austria Wien)

=== Maccabi Tel Aviv ===
In:

No.	Pos.	Nation	Player
—	GK	SRB	Predrag Rajković (from (Serbia) Red Star Belgrade)
—	GK	ISR	Daniel Lifshitz (on loan from (Israel) Hapoel Ra'anana)
—	DF	ISR	Tal Ben Haim (from (England) Charlton Athletic)
—	MF	ISR	Avi Rikan (from (Switzerland) FC Zürich)

Out:

No.	Pos.	Nation	Player
—	GK	ESP	Juan Pablo Colinas (to (Spain) Numancia)
—	GK	ISR	Barak Levi (on loan to (Israel) Maccabi Netanya)
—	MF	ISR	Sheran Yeini (to (Netherlands) Vitesse Arnhem)
