= 2012–13 Liga Leumit =

Liga Leumit
- Season: 2012–13
- Matches: 296
- Goals: 712 (2.41 per match)
- Top goalscorer: Omer Golan; Itzik Cohen (18 goals each)
- Biggest home win: Maccabi Petah Tikva 7–0 Hapoel Ashkelon
- Biggest away win: 3 goals difference (11 games)
- Highest scoring: Hapoel Petah Tikva 4–4 Hapoel Ashkelon

The 2012–13 Liga Leumit was the fourteenth season since its introduction in 1999 and the 71st season of second-tier football in Israel. It began on 24 August 2012 and ended on 20 May 2013.

A total of sixteen teams contested in the league, including twelve sides from the 2011–12 season, one promoted team from the 2011–12 Liga Alef and three relegated teams from the 2011–12 Israeli Premier League.

== Changes from 2011–12 season ==
=== Structural changes ===
There were five structural changes:

- The middle playoff was cancelled, with only top and bottom playoff to be contested by eight teams each, according to their regular season placement. with each team plays 37 matches.
- The points were no longer halved after the regular season.
- Two teams will be promoted to the 2013–14 Israeli Premier League, and two relegated teams from Israeli Premier League.
- Two teams were directly relegated to 2013–14 Liga Alef, Two teams were directly promoted from Liga Alef, and two relegated teams from the Israeli Premier League.
- The 14th place team will compete against the Liga Alef promotion play-off winner for the last spot in 2013–14 Liga Leumit.

=== Team changes ===
Location of teams in the 2012–13 Liga Leumit

Hapoel Ramat Gan were promoted to the 2012–13 Israeli Premier League after beating Hapoel Bnei Lod in the 2011–12 Liga Leumit promotion playoff.

Hapoel Petah Tikva, Hapoel Rishon LeZion, and Maccabi Petah Tikva were directly relegated to the 2012–13 Liga Leumit after finishing the 2011–12 Israeli Premier League season in the bottom three places.

Ironi Bat Yam, Hapoel Herzliya, and Maccabi Be'er Sheva were all relegated to Liga Alef after finishing in the previous season in last three league places. They were replaced by Maccabi Yavne who were promoted to the 2012–13 Liga Leumit after beating Hapoel Asi Gilboa on away goals rule (0–0 away, 2–2 home) in the 2011–12 Liga Alef promotion playoff.

== Overview ==
=== Stadia and locations ===
Club	Stadium	Capacity
Beitar Tel Aviv Ramla	Hatikva Neighborhood Stadium	6,500
Hakoah Amidar Ramat Gan	Winter Stadium	8,000
Hapoel Ashkelon	Sala Stadium	5,250
Hapoel Bnei Lod	Hatikva Neighborhood Stadium	6,500^{[A]}
Hapoel Jerusalem	Teddy Stadium	21,600
Hapoel Kfar Saba	Levita Stadium	5,800
Hapoel Nazareth Illit	Green Stadium	4,000
Hapoel Petah Tikva	HaMoshava Stadium	11,500
Hapoel Ra'anana	Levita Stadium	5,800^{[A]}
Hapoel Rishon LeZion	Haberfeld Stadium	6,000
Maccabi Ahi Nazareth	Ilut Stadium	4,932
Maccabi Herzliya	Herzliya Municipal Stadium	8,100
Maccabi Petah Tikva	HaMoshava Stadium	11,500
Maccabi Umm al-Fahm	Ilut Stadium	4,932^{[A]}
Maccabi Yavne	Yavne Municipal Stadium	4,000
Sektzia Nes Tziona	Ness Ziona Stadium	3,500

The club is playing their home games at a neutral venue because their own ground does not meet Premier League requirements.

== Regular season ==
=== Regular season table ===
Pos	Team	Pld	W	D	L	GF	GA	GD	Pts	Promotion or relegation
1	Maccabi Petah Tikva	30	17	8	5	52	22	+30	59	Top Playoff
2	Hapoel Nazareth Illit	30	15	9	6	38	23	+15	54	Top Playoff
3	Hapoel Ra'anana	30	13	10	7	39	26	+13	49	Top Playoff
4	Hapoel Petah Tikva	30	13	8	9	38	35	+3	47	Top Playoff
5	Hapoel Jerusalem	30	11	12	7	35	28	+7	45	Top Playoff
6	Hapoel Rishon LeZion	30	10	12	8	36	32	+4	42	Top Playoff
7	Maccabi Herzliya	30	10	11	9	31	29	+2	41	Top Playoff
8	Hapoel Bnei Lod	30	9	12	9	30	30	0	39	Top Playoff
9	Maccabi Yavne	30	10	8	12	38	42	−4	38	Bottom Playoff
10	Maccabi Umm al-Fahm	30	9	9	12	29	33	−4	36	Bottom Playoff
11	Sektzia Nes Tziona	30	7	12	11	29	37	−8	33	Bottom Playoff
12	Hakoah Amidar Ramat Gan	30	9	8	13	35	49	−14	33 (Note: Hakoah Amidar Ramat Gan were deducted two points for violation of the budgetary control authority regulations.)	Bottom Playoff
13	Maccabi Ahi Nazareth	30	8	7	15	36	41	−5	31	Bottom Playoff
14	Beitar Tel Aviv Ramla	30	7	9	14	34	50	−16	30	Bottom Playoff
15	Hapoel Ashkelon	30	7	9	14	30	48	−18	30	Bottom Playoff
16	Hapoel Kfar Saba	30	9	8	13	32	37	−5	26 (Note: Hapoel Kfar Saba were deducted nine points for entering administration.)	Bottom Playoff

Source: Israel Football Association
Rules for classification: 1st points; 2nd goal difference; 3rd matches won; 4th goals scored; 5th head-to-head; 6th decision match

=== Regular season results ===
Home \ Away	BTR	HAR	HAS	HBL	HJE	HKS	HNI	HPT	HRA	HRL	MAN	MHE	MPT	MUF	MYA	SNT
Beitar Tel Aviv Ramla		0–2	1–1	1–1	1–4	2–2	2–1	0–1	1–1	2–0	1–3	1–0	0–2	3–1	2–1	3–1
Hakoah Amidar Ramat Gan	1–1		1–1	0–0	2–0	1–1	2–3	1–1	1–3	1–3	3–0	0–0	0–3	0–2	2–2	0–2
Hapoel Ashkelon	2–0	1–4		2–1	0–2	3–2	0–1	0–1	0–1	1–2	0–3	0–2	0–1	1–0	1–0	3–0
Hapoel Bnei Lod	2–2	1–1	1–1		1–1	2–2	0–3	0–1	0–0	3–0	0–3	3–1	0–1	1–0	1–1	1–3
Hapoel Jerusalem	3–1	3–0	1–1	0–0		2–1	1–0	0–0	0–0	2–1	0–0	1–0	1–1	0–1	2–2	1–1
Hapoel Kfar Saba	1–1	1–2	2–0	0–2	0–1		0–2	3–2	1–0	1–1	2–0	1–0	0–1	2–1	0–1	1–3
Hapoel Nazareth Illit	3–2	0–1	1–1	0–0	3–1	1–0		0–0	1–0	0–0	2–1	0–0	2–1	0–0	5–1	2–0
Hapoel Petah Tikva	2–1	2–1	4–4	0–1	3–1	0–3	0–1		1–1	2–1	1–0	5–1	0–2	0–2	2–1	1–2
Hapoel Ra'anana	4–2	1–0	3–1	1–0	1–1	1–2	2–2	3–1		1–1	1–0	2–1	0–1	1–1	4–2	2–1
Hapoel Rishon LeZion	3–1	3–0	0–0	0–0	2–1	4–1	1–3	1–0	0–2		1–1	0–0	1–3	2–0	3–1	1–1
Maccabi Ahi Nazareth	1–3	4–1	1–3	2–3	1–0	0–0	0–0	2–3	0–0	0–1		1–1	5–1	1–2	3–0	2–1
Maccabi Herzliya	3–0	2–3	2–1	2–1	1–0	0–0	3–0	2–3	2–1	0–0	0–0		1–1	0–0	3–1	2–1
Maccabi Petah Tikva	2–0	1–2	7–0	0–1	1–1	0–1	2–0	0–0	1–0	1–1	3–2	3–1		3–0	4–0	0–0
Maccabi Umm al-Fahm	2–0	2–0	1–1	0–1	1–2	1–1	1–2	0–1	1–1	2–2	1–0	0–0	1–4		1–2	1–1
Maccabi Yavne	0–0	5–0	2–0	1–0	1–2	2–1	1–0	0–0	2–0	2–1	4–0	0–0	2–2	0–1		0–1
Sektzia Nes Tziona	1–1	0–3	1–1	1–3	0–0	1–0	0–0	1–1	0–2	1–1	3–0	0–1	0–0	1–3	1–1	

Source: Israel Football Association
Legend: Blue = home team win; Yellow = draw; Red = away team win.

== Playoffs ==
Key numbers for pairing determination (number marks position after 30 games):

Rounds
31st	32nd	33rd	34th	35th	36th	37th
1 – 8; 2 – 7; 3 – 6; 4 – 5	1 – 2; 6 – 4; 7 – 3; 8 – 5	2 – 8; 3 – 1; 4 – 7; 5 – 6	1 – 4; 2 – 3; 7 – 5; 8 – 6	3 – 8; 4 – 2; 5 – 1; 6 – 7	1 – 6; 2 – 5; 3 – 4; 8 – 7	4 – 8; 5 – 3; 6 – 2; 7 – 1
9 – 16; 10 – 15; 11 – 14; 12 – 13	9 – 10; 14 – 12; 15 – 11; 16 – 13	10 – 16; 11 – 9; 12 – 15; 13 – 14	9 – 12; 10 – 11; 15 – 13; 16 – 14	11 – 16; 12 – 10; 13 – 9; 14 – 15	9 – 14; 10 – 13; 11 – 12; 16 – 15	12 – 16; 13 – 11; 14 – 10; 15 – 9

=== Top Playoff ===
==== Top Playoff table ====
Pos	Team	Pld	W	D	L	GF	GA	GD	Pts	Promotion or relegation
1	Maccabi Petah Tikva (P)	37	21	10	6	66	29	+37	73	Promotion to Israeli Premier League
2	Hapoel Ra'anana (P)	37	20	10	7	56	33	+23	70	Promotion to Israeli Premier League
3	Hapoel Nazareth Illit	37	19	10	8	48	30	+18	67	
4	Hapoel Jerusalem	37	15	12	10	48	39	+9	57	
5	Hapoel Petah Tikva	37	15	8	14	45	48	−3	53	
6	Hapoel Rishon LeZion	37	11	15	11	44	43	+1	48	
7	Maccabi Herzliya	37	10	14	13	33	39	−6	44	
8	Hapoel Bnei Lod	37	10	13	14	37	42	−5	43	

Source: Israel Football Association
Rules for classification: 1st points; 2nd goal difference; 3rd matches won; 4th goals scored; 5th head-to-head; 6th decision match
(P) Promoted

==== Top Playoff results ====
Home \ Away	HBL	HJE	HNI	HPT	HRA	HRL	MHE	MPT
Hapoel Bnei Lod		1–2				3–1	0–0	
Hapoel Jerusalem					1–3	2–1		2–4
Hapoel Nazareth Illit	1–0	2–0			1–3		2–0	
Hapoel Petah Tikva	3–2	0–3	1–2				2–0	
Hapoel Ra'anana	3–1			2–1		2–1		2–1
Hapoel Rishon LeZion			2–2	1–0			0–0	
Maccabi Herzliya		0–3			1–2			1–1
Maccabi Petah Tikva	2–0		1–0	3–0		2–2		

Source: Israel Football Association
Legend: Blue = home team win; Yellow = draw; Red = away team win.

=== Bottom Playoff ===
==== Bottom Playoff table ====
Pos	Team	Pld	W	D	L	GF	GA	GD	Pts	Qualification or relegation
9	Maccabi Yavne	37	13	10	14	48	52	−4	49	
10	Maccabi Ahi Nazareth	37	13	8	16	49	47	+2	47	
11	Hakoah Amidar Ramat Gan	37	12	10	15	46	59	−13	44 (Note: Hakoah Amidar Ramat Gan were deducted two points for violation of the budgetary control authority regulations.)	
12	Maccabi Umm al-Fahm	37	10	11	16	39	44	−5	41	
13	Hapoel Ashkelon	37	10	11	16	38	57	−19	41	
14	Beitar Tel Aviv Ramla (O)	37	9	13	15	45	58	−13	40	Qualification for relegation play-offs
15	Sektzia Nes Tziona (R)	37	7	16	14	33	47	−14	37	Relegation to Liga Alef
16	Hapoel Kfar Saba (R)	37	10	11	16	37	45	−8	32 (Note: Hapoel Kfar Saba were deducted nine points for entering administration.)	Relegation to Liga Alef

Source: Israel Football Association
Rules for classification: 1st points; 2nd goal difference; 3rd matches won; 4th goals scored; 5th head-to-head; 6th decision match
(O) Play-off winners; (R) Relegated

==== Bottom Playoff results ====
Home \ Away	BTR	HAR	HAS	HKS	MAN	MUF	MYA	SNT
Beitar Tel Aviv Ramla		2–1	2–3			1–1		
Hakoah Amidar Ramat Gan			1–1	2–1	3–2	2–1		
Hapoel Ashkelon					0–1		1–1	1–0
Hapoel Kfar Saba	1–1		1–2		0–2			
Maccabi Ahi Nazareth	0–0						2–1	4–1
Maccabi Umm al-Fahm			3–0	1–2	1–2			1–1
Maccabi Yavne	1–4	2–1		0–0		3–2		
Sektzia Nes Tziona	1–1	1–1		0–0			0–2	

Source: Israel Football Association
Legend: Blue = home team win; Yellow = draw; Red = away team win.

== Relegation playoff ==
=== Relegation playoff ===
The 14th-placed Beitar Tel Aviv Ramla faced 2012–13 Liga Alef promotion winner Beitar Kfar Saba. Beitar Tel Aviv Ramla, the winner on aggregate kept its spot in the 2013–14 Liga Leumit. The matches took place on May 24 and 27, 2013.

24 May 2013
16:00 UTC+3

Beitar Kfar Saba	1 – 1	Beitar Tel Aviv Ramla
Revivo 53'	Report	30' Ben Shushan

Levita Stadium, Kfar Saba
Referee: Orel Grinfeeld

28 May 2013
19:30 UTC+3

Beitar Tel Aviv Ramla	3 – 1	Beitar Kfar Saba
Amos 14', 58'; Soltan 78'	Report	40' Deri

Winter Stadium, Ramat Gan
Referee: Eli Hacmon

Beitar Tel Aviv Ramla won 4–2 on aggregate.

== Top goalscorers ==
Rank	Scorer	Club	Goals
1	(Israel) Omer Golan	Maccabi Petah Tikva	18
1	(Israel) Itzik Cohen	Hapoel Jerusalem	18
3	(Palestine) Ahmad Abu Nahyeh	Maccabi Umm al-Fahm	13
3	(Senegal) Mamadou Thiam	Hapoel Ra'anana	13
5	(Israel) Oren Nissim	Maccabi Yavne	12
5	(Israel) Kobi Hassan	Hapoel Ra'anana	12
5	(Israel) Timor Avitan	Maccabi Yavne	12
8	(Israel) Dani Preda	Maccabi Petah Tikva	11
8	(Israel) Ran Rol	Hapoel Nazareth Illit	11
8	(Democratic Republic of the Congo) Alain Masudi	Maccabi Ahi Nazareth	11
8	(Ivory Coast) Serge Ayeli	Maccabi Ahi Nazareth	11
Total			712
Average per game			2.41

Source: Israel Football Association

=== Hat-tricks ===
Player	For	Against	Result	Date
(Israel) Maor Ida	Hakoah Amidar Ramat Gan	Hapoel Ashkelon	3–1	14 September 2012
(Israel) Omer Golan	Maccabi Petah Tikva	Hapoel Ashkelon	7–0	22 December 2012
(Israel) Eran Malkin	Hapoel Nazareth Illit	Hapoel Bnei Lod	3–0	12 February 2013
(Israel) Itzik Cohen	Hapoel Petah Tikva	Hapoel Jerusalem	3–0	5 April 2013
(Israel) Gil Blumstein	Hapoel Ashkelon	Beitar Tel Aviv	3–2	4 May 2013

== Season statistics ==
=== Scoring ===
- First goal of the season: (Israel) Shlomi Ashur for Hapoel Rishon LeZion against Hakoah Amidar Ramat Gan, 12th minute (24 August 2012)
- Most goals in a match by one player: 3 goals –
  - (Israel) Maor Ida for Hakoah Amidar Ramat Gan against Hapoel Ashkelon (14 September 2012)
  - (Israel) Omer Golan for Maccabi Petah Tikva against Hapoel Ashkelon (22 December 2012)
  - (Israel) Eran Malkin for Hapoel Nazareth Illit against Hapoel Bnei Lod (12 February 2013)
  - (Israel) Itzik Cohen for Hapoel Jerusalem against Hapoel Petah Tikva (5 April 2013)
  - (Israel) Gil Blumstein for Hapoel Ashkelon against Beitar Tel Aviv (4 May 2013)

=== Discipline ===
- First yellow card of the season: (Israel) Orel Edri for Maccabi Yavne against Maccabi Herzliya, 18th minute (24 August 2012)
- First red card of the season: (Israel) Dudu Avraham for Maccabi Yavne against Maccabi Herzliya, 47th minute (24 August 2012)

== See also ==
- 2012–13 Israel State Cup
- 2012–13 Toto Cup Leumit
