= 2012–13 Toto Cup Leumit =

Toto Cup Leumit
- Season: 2012–13
- Champions: Hapoel Rishon LeZion

The 2012–13 Toto Cup Leumit is the 23rd season of the second tier League Cup (as a separate competition) since its introduction. It will be held in two stages. First, sixteen Liga Leumit teams are divided into four groups. The winners and runners-up advancing to the quarter-finals. Quarter-finals, semi-finals and the Final are to be held as one-legged matches, with the Final played at the Ramat Gan Stadium.

It began on 10 August 2012 and ended on 4 December 2012. Hapoel Ramat Gan, making it their second Toto Cup title overall, due to the promotion in the previous season the club could not defend their title.

It won on 4 December 2012 by Hapoel Rishon LeZion.

== Group stage ==
The draw took place on 2 July 2012.

The matches were played from 10 August to 8 September 2012.

=== Group A ===
Pos	Team	Pld	W	D	L	GF	GA	GD	Pts	HRA	MAN	MUF	HNI
1	Hapoel Ra'anana (A)	3	3	0	0	10	1	+9	9				4–0
2	Maccabi Ahi Nazareth (A)	3	2	0	1	4	4	0	6	0–3			2–0
3	Maccabi Umm al-Fahm	3	0	1	2	2	5	−3	1	1–3	1–2		
4	Hapoel Nazareth Illit	3	0	1	2	0	6	−6	1			0–0	

Source: football.org.il (in Hebrew)
Rules for classification: 1st points; 2nd goal difference; 3rd matches won; 4th goals scored; 5th head-to-head; 6th decision match
(A) Advanced to the quarterfinals

=== Group B ===
Pos	Team	Pld	W	D	L	GF	GA	GD	Pts	HPT	MPT	MHE	HKS
1	Hapoel Petah Tikva (A)	3	2	1	0	4	2	+2	7		1–0		
2	Maccabi Petah Tikva (A)	3	1	1	1	3	1	+2	4			3–0	0–0
3	Maccabi Herzliya	3	1	0	2	4	4	0	3	0–1			4–0
4	Hapoel Kfar Saba	3	0	2	1	2	6	−4	2	2–2			

Source: football.org.il (in Hebrew)
Rules for classification: 1st points; 2nd goal difference; 3rd matches won; 4th goals scored; 5th head-to-head; 6th decision match
(A) Advanced to the quarterfinals

=== Group C ===
Pos	Team	Pld	W	D	L	GF	GA	GD	Pts	HRL	HBL	HAR	BTR
1	Hapoel Rishon LeZion (A)	3	3	0	0	7	0	+7	9			1–0	
2	Hapoel Bnei Lod (A)	3	2	0	1	6	4	+2	6	0–3		2–1	
3	Hakoah Amidar Ramat Gan	3	0	1	2	1	3	−2	1				0–0
4	Beitar Tel Aviv Ramla	3	0	1	2	0	7	−7	1	0–3	0–4		

Source: football.org.il (in Hebrew)
Rules for classification: 1st points; 2nd goal difference; 3rd matches won; 4th goals scored; 5th head-to-head; 6th decision match
(A) Advanced to the quarterfinals

=== Group D ===
Pos	Team	Pld	W	D	L	GF	GA	GD	Pts	SNT	MYA	HJE	HAS
1	Sektzia Nes Tziona (A)	3	2	1	0	6	1	+5	7			1–1	3–0
2	Maccabi Yavne (A)	3	2	0	1	4	3	+1	6	0–2			
3	Hapoel Jerusalem	3	1	1	1	5	4	+1	4		0–2		
4	Hapoel Ashkelon	3	0	0	3	2	9	−7	0		1–2	1–4	

Source: football.org.il (in Hebrew)
Rules for classification: 1st points; 2nd goal difference; 3rd matches won; 4th goals scored; 5th head-to-head; 6th decision match
(A) Advanced to the quarterfinals

== Elimination rounds ==
=== Quarterfinals ===
The matches were played on 12 and 13 October 2012.

Home team	Score^{1}	Away team
Hapoel Petah Tikva	0 – 2	Hapoel Ra'anana
Maccabi Petah Tikva	1 – 1	Sektzia Nes Tziona
Maccabi Petah Tikva won 2 – 1 after extra time
Hapoel Bnei Lod	5 – 1	Maccabi Ahi Nazareth
Maccabi Yavne	1 – 2	Hapoel Rishon LeZion

^{1} Score after 90 minutes

=== Semifinals ===
The matches were played on 20 November 2012.

Home team	Score^{1}	Away team
Hapoel Bnei Lod	0 – 2	Hapoel Ra'anana
Maccabi Petah Tikva	0 – 1	Hapoel Rishon LeZion

^{1} Score after 90 minutes

=== Final ===
4 December 2012
18:00 IST

Hapoel Ra'anana	2 – 2 (a.e.t.)	Hapoel Rishon LeZion
Fodi 30'; Mamadou 55'	Report	25' Asulin; 42' Shaked
Penalties
Malka (penalty scored); Ziv (penalty missed); Fodi (penalty scored); Melamed (penalty scored); Mamadou (penalty scored); Babayev (penalty missed)	4 – 5	(penalty scored) Mayo; (penalty missed) Abend; (penalty scored) Elkaslasi; (penalty scored) Asur; (penalty scored) Asulin; (penalty scored) Tuef

Ramat Gan Stadium, Ramat Gan
Attendance: 300
Referee: Oren Siminyan

== See also ==
- 2012–13 Toto Cup Al
- 2012–13 Liga Leumit
- 2012–13 Israel State Cup
