= Lior Asulin =

Israeli footballer (1980–2023)

Lior Asulin ליאור אסולין
Personal information
- Date of birth: 6 October 1980
- Place of birth: Ra'anana, Israel
- Date of death: 7 October 2023 (aged 43)
- Place of death: Re'im, Israel
- Height: 1.71 m (5 ft 7 in)
- Position: Striker

Youth career
- 1995–1997: Maccabi Herzliya

Senior career*
Years	Team	Apps	(Gls)
1997–2007	Maccabi Herzliya	128	(48)
2002–2003	→ Maccabi Petah Tikva (loan)	31	(11)
2003–2004	→ Bnei Sakhnin (loan)	28	(10)
2004–2006	→ Beitar Jerusalem (loan)	57	(27)
2006–2007	→ Bnei Yehuda (loan)	30	(13)
2007–2008	Hapoel Tel Aviv	10	(0)
2008	→ Apollon Limassol (loan)	8	(1)
2008–2009	Maccabi Petah Tikva	24	(7)
2009–2011	Hapoel Be'er Sheva	23	(11)
2011–2012	Hapoel Ramat Gan	27	(12)
2012–2013	Hapoel Rishon LeZion	23	(8)
2013–2014	Hapoel Petah Tikva	40	(15)
2014–2015	Hapoel Ashkelon	15	(8)
2015–2016	Hapoel Petah Tikva	24	(4)
2016	Hapoel Marmorek	2	(0)
2017	Hapoel Nazareth Illit	11	(1)
- * Club domestic league appearances and goals

Lior Asulin (Hebrew: ליאור אסולין; 6 October 1980 – 7 October 2023) was an Israeli professional footballer who played as a striker. He was murdered during the Nova music festival massacre, which was part of the attack that led to the outbreak of the Gaza war.

== Career ==
=== Maccabi Herzliya and Ariel Shaiman ===
A native of Ra'anana, Israel, Asulin grew up in the youth system of Maccabi Herzliya and it was there that he made the jump to Israel's highest league, Israeli Premier League but did not last long as the club was relegated just two seasons after he made the first team.

In Liga Leumit Asulin scored a league leading twenty-eight goals, so after the 2001–02 season, club chairman Ariel Shaiman loaned Lior out to clubs in the top league and signed him to a long-term contract with Herzliya hoping to cash in on a large transfer fee.

During his seasons on loan, Asulin won the State Cup and established himself as one of the top Israeli strikers in the domestic league. After the 2005–06 season, Herzliya chairman Ariel Shaiman disclosed to the media that he received lucrative offers from Olympique de Marseille and OGC Nice from France, from Russia, Turkey, three teams from Cyprus, and from a team in Greece for Asulin's services though nothing ever came about from said offers.

After winning the State Cup with Bnei Sakhnin, he signed on loan for Beitar Jerusalem.

=== Hapoel Tel Aviv and Apollon Limassol ===
In June 2007, Asulin signed for a four-year contract with Hapoel Tel Aviv.

In January 2008, he signed for Apollon Limassol on loan.

=== Hapoel Be'er Sheva and Hapoel Ramat Gan ===
From 2009 to 2011 Asulin played for Hapoel Be'er Sheva in the Israeli Premier League.

On 17 August 2011, Asulin signed a contract with Hapoel Ramat Gan in Liga Leumit. Asulin helped them win the Leumit double as they won the Toto Cup and the league to secure promotion to the Premier League. He was the club's top scorer in that season, scoring in total 14 goals in all competitions.

=== Suspension ===
In April 2012, Asulin participated in the "violent brawl" between Hapoel Ramat Gan and Bnei Lod. He was suspended for 6 games and released from Ramat Gan.

=== Hapoel Rishon LeZion ===
In 2012, Asulin signed a new contract with Hapoel Rishon LeZion. On 4 December 2012, he helped the club win their first trophy when he scored a goal and a penalty in the 2012–13 Toto Cup Leumit finals.

== Personal life ==
In 2021, Asulin pled guilty to 30 drug trafficking offenses connected to Telegrass. He was sentenced to 19 months in prison. He served 8 months at Ma'asiyahu Prison before being released for good behavior.

== Death ==
On 7 October 2023, Asulin was attending a music festival in Re'im, when the Palestinian terrorist group Hamas launched an attack on the festival during the first day of the Gaza war. He was among the 378 people killed during the fighting.

== Honours ==
- Toto Cup (Leumit): 2011, 2012
- Liga Leumit: 2011–12
