= Omer Golan =

Israeli footballer

Omer Golan עומר גולן
Personal information
- Full name: Omer Golan
- Date of birth: 4 October 1982 (age 44)
- Place of birth: Holon, Israel
- Height: 1.82 m (5 ft 11 1/2 in)
- Position: Striker

Team information
- Current team: Maccabi Petah Tikva

Youth career
- Maccabi Petah Tikva

Senior career*
Years	Team	Apps	(Gls)
2000–2007	Maccabi Petah Tikva	161	(49)
2008–2010	Lokeren	62	(13)
2010–2014	Maccabi Petah Tikva	92	(33)
Total		315	(95)

International career
2002–2003	Israel U21	5	(2)
2004–2010	Israel	37	(8)

Managerial career
- 2014–: Maccabi Petah Tikva (director of football)
- * Club domestic league appearances and goals

Omer Golan (Hebrew: עומר גולן; born 4 October 1982) is a former Israeli footballer. He played as a striker for his home club Maccabi Petah Tikva and for Lokeren.

== Club career ==
=== Maccabi Petah Tikva ===
Golan played in the youth ranks of Maccabi Petah Tikva, before being transferred to the first team in 2000. In the 2003–04 Israeli Premier League, Golan was the third equal highest goalscorer, netting 13 times. In the 2005–06 Israeli Premier League, Golan was the fifth equal highest goalscorer, with 11 strikes.

Golan was a member of the winning Toto Cup side of 2003–04, who were victorious against Maccabi Haifa 3–0 in the final. Golan scored goals in the semi-finals and the final of the tournament. He scored the final goal of the semi-final that finished in a 3–1 win against Maccabi Netanya, and the last goal of the final against Maccabi Haifa.

Golan also scored a hat trick in the 2005–06 UEFA Cup first round qualifying against Macedonian side FK Bashkimi in an 11–0 aggregate victory for the Israeli side. Golan scored a second hat-trick in the next phase of qualification, the first round, against Serbian side FK Partizan to ensure a 5–4 aggregate progression to the group stages of the tournament. However, Maccabi was outclassed in the group stages, which included RCD Espanyol, U.S. Città di Palermo, FC Lokomotiv Moscow and Brøndby IF. Losing all of its matches, the Israeli club only managed one goal in four matches. This goal was scored by Golan in a 2–1 loss to Palermo.

In seven years with the club he made 207 appearances in all club competitions, scoring 67 times and provided 14 assists.

=== Lokeren ===
In December 2007, Omer Golan got his transfer to Europe when the Belgian club Lokeren paid an estimated $1 million to his former club, Maccabi Petah Tikva. One of his demands in the contract is that he could leave the club if a bigger club offers him a contract. Several Belgian top clubs such as Anderlecht and Standard as well as some English clubs, were reportedly wanting to sign him, but he finally signed in Lokeren, most likely due to the significantly higher wages which were offered to him.

In Golan's first season at Lokeren, the 2007–08 season, he scored 5 goals in 15 appearances. In his second season, he scored 6 goals in 29 appearances and in his last season with the club he scored 2 goals in 18 appearances. Overall in all club competitions he scored 13 times and made 6 assists in 64 games for Lokeren.

=== Maccabi Petah Tikva ===
After an unsuccessful spell at Lokeren, Golan returned to Maccabi Petah Tikva. In his first season back he scored 10 goals and made 1 assist in 28 games in all club competitions. In the 2011–12 season he had a very poor season only scoring 6 times in 33 games and Petah Tikva also had a poor season as they got relegated after 21 consecutive seasons in the top flight. The next season, he won with Petah Tikva the 2012–13 Liga Leumit as the club got promoted back to the Premier League, Golan had one of his best seasons as he scored 18 league goals and was one of the most important players for the team in that season.

On March 13, 2014, he retired from professional football. During his 11 seasons with Maccabi Petah Tikva he made 313 total appearances. He is the club's all-time leading scorer with 103 goals in all competitions.

== International career ==
Golan made his international debut for the Israel national football team when he came on as a 74th-minute substitute for Eyal Berkovich in a friendly against the Moldova national football team on 28 April 2004. His first international goal came on 9 February 2004 against the Croatia national football team, when he scored the final goal to tie the game at 3–3.

On 17 November 2007, Omer Golan scored the winning goal for Israel against Russia, handing England a lifeline in their qualification group for Euro 2008, meaning England could still qualify; if Russia had won, qualification for England would be near impossible. Golan was, for a short period, proclaimed a hero by English football fans; but England lost the match to Croatia meaning they did not qualify for Euro 2008.

A 2007–2009 England home shirt, with printing of Golan's name and number, demonstrating his temporary hero status for England fans.

According to Golan, before he scored against Russia, many thought that he was on the national team because of his strong friendship with Avi Luzon, then IFA chief and former owner of Maccabi Petah Tikva.

== Honours ==
- Toto Cup (1): 2003–04
- Liga Leumit (1): 2012–13
