= Yosef Abu Laben =

Israeli footballer

Yosef Abu Laben يوسف أبو لبن
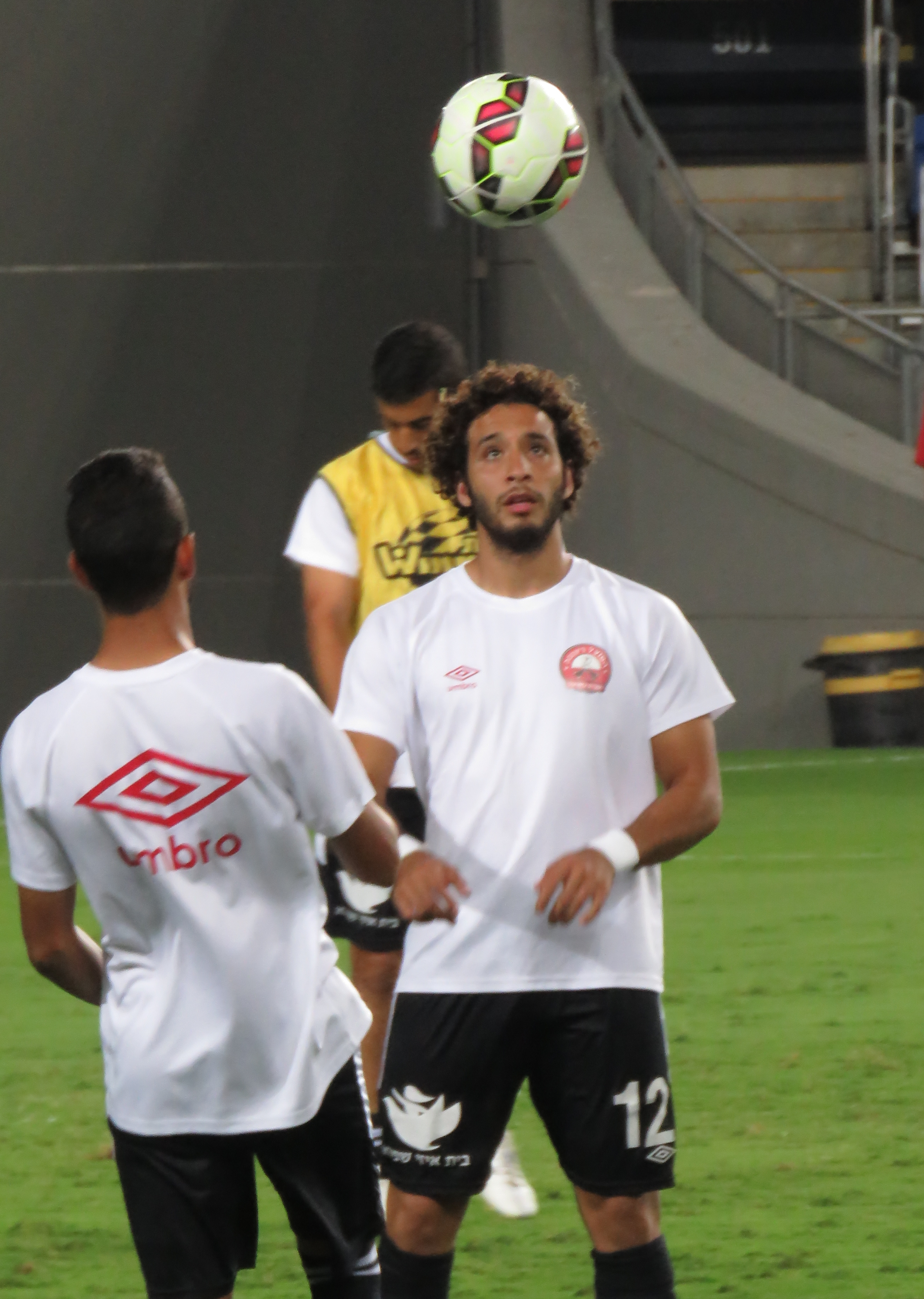
- Abu Laben playing for Hapoel Ra'anana in 2015

Personal information
- Full name: Yosef Abu Laben
- Date of birth: May 26, 1992 (age 34)
- Place of birth: Be'er Sheva, Israel
- Position: Forward

Youth career
- Hapoel Be'er Sheva

Senior career*
Years	Team	Apps	(Gls)
2011–2015	Hapoel Be'er Sheva	21	(2)
2014	→ Hapoel Nir Ramat HaSharon (loan)	15	(5)
2015	→ Bnei Sakhnin (loan)	8	(0)
2015–2016	Hapoel Ra'anana	2	(0)
2016	→ Hapoel Rishon LeZion (loan)	14	(4)
2016–2017	Hapoel Bnei Lod	8	(1)
2017–2018	Shmishon Kafr Qasim	34	(26)
2018	Shimhon Bnei Tayibe	9	(6)
2018–2019	F.C. Ironi Or Yehuda	19	(10)
2019	F.C. Dimona	8	(6)
- * Club domestic league appearances and goals

Yousef Abu Laben (Arabic: يوسف أبو لبن, Hebrew: יוסף אבו לבן; born 26 May 1992) is a former Israeli footballer.
