= Telegrass =

Israeli cannabis trading network

Telegrass was a cannabis distribution network in Israel with over 200,000 members. It used the messaging application Telegram, which offers encrypted messaging features. The network enabled anonymous cannabis delivery and provided an option for users to rate the products and the vendors.

It was estimated that Telegrass generated revenues of 60 million NIS monthly. According to Haaretz, there were more than 70,000 Telegrass users and over 1,300 dealers, with numbers constantly increasing. The Times of Israel reported that there are over 100,000 registered users. Telegrass was founded by Amos Silver, a 33-year-old Israeli activist.

In March 2019, the Israeli and Ukrainian police arrested the leaders of Telegrass, including the CEO. Silver was extradited to Israel in August 2019.

Telegrass ceased operations on 23 July 2023.
