= César Arzo =

Spanish footballer

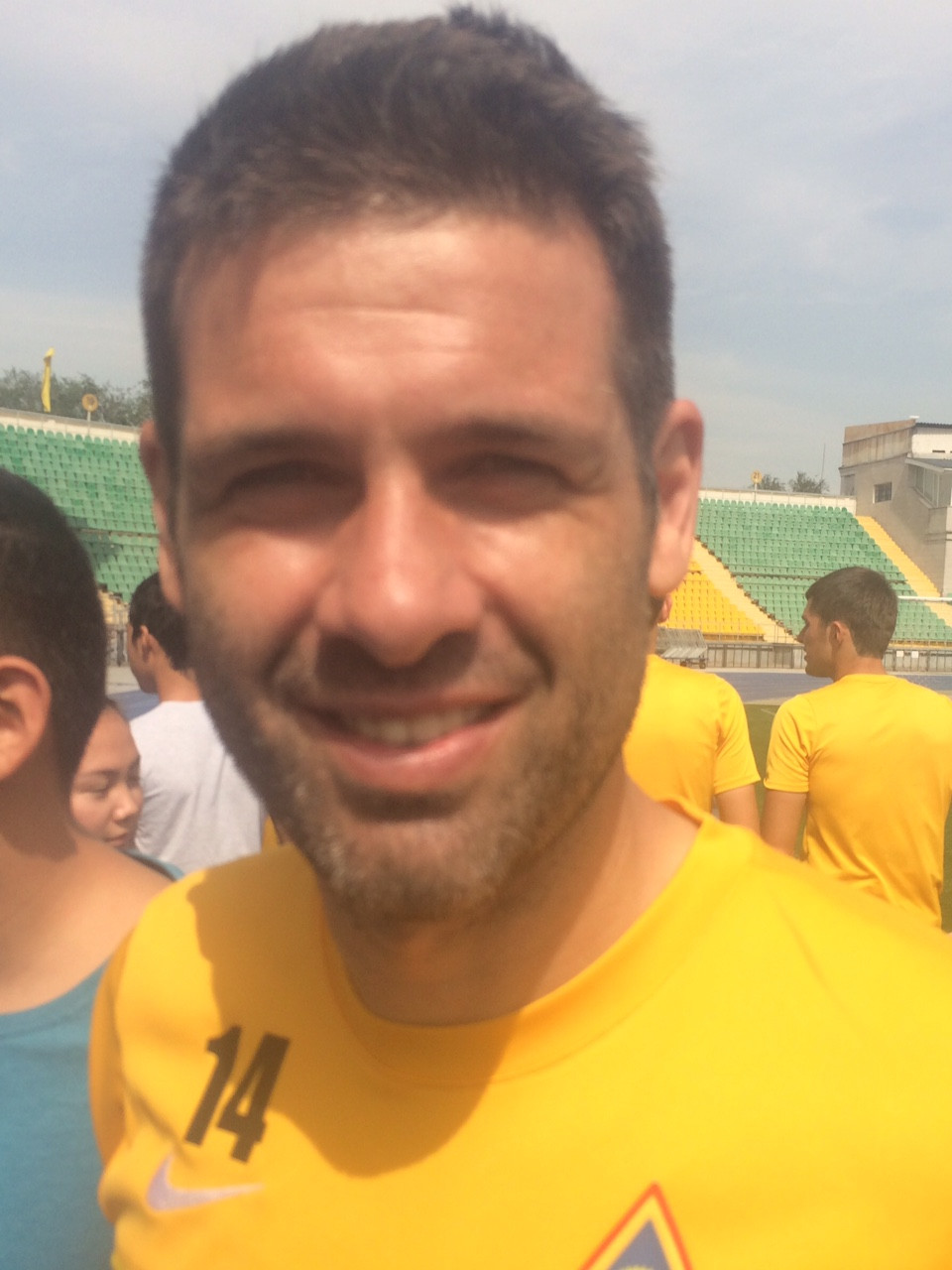
- Arzo with Kairat in 2017

Personal information
- Full name: César Arzo Amposta
- Date of birth: 21 January 1986 (age 40)
- Place of birth: Villarreal, Spain
- Height: 1.86 m (6 ft 1 in)
- Position: Centre back

Youth career
- Villarreal

Senior career*
Years	Team	Apps	(Gls)
2002–2004	Villarreal B		
2003–2008	Villarreal	39	(1)
2006–2007	→ Recreativo (loan)	24	(0)
2007–2008	→ Murcia (loan)	28	(0)
2008–2009	Recreativo	24	(0)
2009–2011	Valladolid	38	(3)
2011–2013	Gent	84	(4)
2014	Zaragoza	18	(2)
2014–2015	Beitar Jerusalem	27	(0)
2015–2016	AEK Athens	23	(0)
2016–2017	Kairat	39	(2)
2018–2019	Gimnàstic	12	(0)
Total		356	(12)

International career
2002–2003	Spain U17	13	(0)
2005	Spain U19	3	(0)
2006–2008	Spain U21	4	(0)

Managerial career
- 2021: Villarreal C (assistant)
- 2021–2022: Roda (youth)
- 2022–2023: Villarreal (youth)
- 2026: Juventud Torremolinos
Medal record
Representing Spain
Men's football
FIFA U-17 World Cup
Runner-up	2003 Finland
UEFA European Under-17 Championship
Runner-up	2003 Portugal
- * Club domestic league appearances and goals

César Arzo Amposta (Spanish pronunciation: [ˈθesaɾ ˈaɾθo]; born 21 January 1986) is a Spanish retired footballer who played as a central defender, and a current manager.

== Playing career ==
Arzo was born in Villarreal, Valencian Community. He came through the ranks of hometown club Villarreal CF, making his debut for the first team on 23 March 2003 against Real Sociedad but never being able to consolidate himself in the starting XI, however.

In the 2006–07 season, Arzo was loaned to La Liga newcomers Recreativo de Huelva alongside teammates Javier López Vallejo and Santi Cazorla, moving on loan for the following campaign to another promotee, Real Murcia. Immediately after returning from his latter loan he was deemed surplus to requirements by Villarreal boss Manuel Pellegrini, rejoining, now definitely, Recreativo on a free transfer.

Arzo returned to Villarreal in July 2009, as the club retained an option to buy back from Huelva. However, he was immediately sold, signing a four-year contract with Real Valladolid as well as former Villarreal teammate Marcos.

In summer 2011, aged 25, Arzo moved abroad, going on to represent in the following years K.A.A. Gent (Belgium), Beitar Jerusalem FC (Israel) and AEK Athens FC (Greece). This was interspersed with a five-month spell back in his country, with Real Zaragoza.

On 5 July 2016, Arzo signed a two-year contract with Kazakhstan Premier League side FC Kairat. He left by mutual agreement on 21 November 2017 and, late into the following month, he returned to his country by joining Gimnàstic de Tarragona.

Arzo suffered a knee injury in October 2018, and subsequently retired. The following March, he joined the political party Citizens, taking part of their candidacy for the Congress of Deputies.

== Coaching career ==
In 2019, Arzo returned to the structure of Villarreal, becoming an analyst in the youth sides of affiliate team CD Roda. In 2021, he was named manager of the club's Cadete squad, before taking over Villarreal's Juvenil C team in the following year.

In the following two seasons, Arzo was an assistant of Villarreal's Juvenil B and Roda's Juvenil A squads, before joining Marcelino García Toral's staff in the first team as a match analyst. On 12 August 2026, he was appointed manager of Juventud de Torremolinos CF in the Primera Federación, replacing sacked Aitor Martínez, but was himself dismissed on 9 October.

== Career statistics ==
=== Club ===
Appearances and goals by club, season and competition
Club	Season	League			National Cup		League Cup		Continental		Other		Total	
Club	Season	Division	Apps	Goals	Apps	Goals	Apps	Goals	Apps	Goals	Apps	Goals	Apps	Goals
Villarreal	2002–03	La Liga	2	0	0	0	–		–		–		2	0
Villarreal	2003–04	La Liga	10	0	2	0	–		2	0	–		14	0
Villarreal	2004–05	La Liga	15	1	1	0	–		10	0	–		26	1
Villarreal	2005–06	La Liga	12	0	2	0	–		4	0	–		18	0
Villarreal	2006–07	La Liga	0	0	0	0	–		–		–		0	0
Villarreal	2007–08	La Liga	0	0	0	0	–		–		–		0	0
Villarreal	Total		39	1	5	0	-	-	16	0	-	-	60	1
Recreativo (loan)	2006–07	La Liga	24	0	2	0	–		–		–		26	0
Murcia (loan)	2007–08	La Liga	28	0	0	0	–		–		–		28	10
Recreativo	2008–09	La Liga	24	0	1	0	–		–		–		25	0
Valladolid	2009–10	La Liga	22	1	2	1	–		–		–		24	2
Valladolid	2010–11	Segunda División	16	2	3	0	–		–		–		19	2
Valladolid	Total		38	3	5	1	-	-	-	-	-	-	43	4
Gent	2010–11	Belgian First Division A	14	0	3	0	–		–		–		17	0
Gent	2011–12	Belgian First Division A	31	2	2	0	–		–		–		33	2
Gent	2012–13	Belgian First Division A	31	2	3	0	–		4	1	–		38	3
Gent	2013–14	Belgian First Division A	8	0	0	0	–		–		–		8	0
Gent	Total		84	4	8	0	-	-	4	1	-	-	96	5
Zaragoza	2013–14	Segunda División	18	2	0	0	–		–		–		18	2
Beitar Jerusalem	2014–15	Israeli Premier League	27	0	1	0	3	0	–		–		31	0
AEK Athens	2015–16	Super League Greece	23	0	1	0	–		0	0	–		24	0
Kairat	2016	Kazakhstan Premier League	12	1	3	0	–		1	0	0	0	16	1
Kairat	2017	Kazakhstan Premier League	27	1	3	0	–		2	0	1	1	33	2
Kairat	Total		39	2	6	0	-	-	3	0	1	1	49	3
Gimnàstic	2017–18	Segunda División	10	0	0	0	–		–		–		10	0
Gimnàstic	2018–19	Segunda División	2	0	0	0	–		–		–		2	0
Gimnàstic	Total		12	0	0	0	–		–		–		12	0
Career total			356	12	29	1	3	0	23	1	1	1	412	15

== Honours ==
=== Club ===
Villarreal

- UEFA Intertoto Cup: 2003, 2004

AEK

- Greek Football Cup: 2015–16

Kairat

- Kazakhstan Cup: 2017
- Kazakhstan Super Cup: 2017
