= Gil Blumstein =

Israeli professional footballer

Gil Blumstein גיל בלומשטיין
Personal information
- Full name: Gil Blumstein
- Date of birth: 20 May 1990 (age 36)
- Place of birth: Kfar Yona, Israel
- Height: 1.81 m (5 ft 11 1/2 in)
- Position: Forward

Team information
- Current team: Hapoel Rishon LeZion
- Number: 70

Youth career
- 1999–2004: Beitar Tubruk
- 2004–2006: Villarreal
- 2006–2007: Ironi Rishon leZion
- 2007: Gent
- 2007–2008: Maccabi Netanya

Senior career*
Years	Team	Apps	(Gls)
2008–2009	Maccabi Petah Tikva	0	(0)
2009–2010	Hapoel Be'er Sheva	14	(0)
2010–2011	Inverness Caledonian Thistle	5	(0)
2012	Ironi Ramat HaSharon	0	(0)
2012–2014	Hapoel Ashkelon	44	(12)
2014	Bnei Lod	6	(1)
2014–2015	Hapoel Ra'anana	2	(0)
2015–2016	Beitar Tel Aviv Ramla	15	(2)
2017	Hapoel Rishon LeZion	6	(0)

International career^{‡}
2006	Israel U17	2	(0)
2007	Israel U18	2	(2)
2011	Israel U21	2	(0)
- * Club domestic league appearances and goals as of 14:56, 14 August 2015 (UTC) ‡ National team caps and goals as of 14:56, 14 August 2010 (UTC)

Gil Blumstein (Hebrew: גיל בלומשטיין; born 20 May 1990) is an Israeli professional footballer who plays for Hapoel Rishon LeZion. Blumstein plays as a forward and as an attacking midfielder. He also holds a Polish passport.

== Playing career ==
Blumstein signed his first professional contract with Maccabi Petah Tikva in July 2008, but he could not get minutes and he moved lately to Hapoel Be'er Sheva.

Blumstein made his debut for Hapoel Be'er Sheva in a league match against his former club, Maccabi Petah Tikva on 26 September 2009.

On 5 July 2010, Blumstein signed at Inverness. He made his debut against Celtic on 14 October 2010. He moved off the bench on 61st minute, but he injured and replaced 17 minutes later. For the 2012–13 season He signed with Hapoel Ashkelon in Liga Leumit. He played at Ashkelon for two seasons.

At June 2014 moved to Hapoel Ra'anana. The next season, he returned to play in Liga Leumit, this time for Beitar Tel Aviv Ramla.
