= Danny Preda =

Israeli footballer (born 1987)

Dani Preda דני פרדה
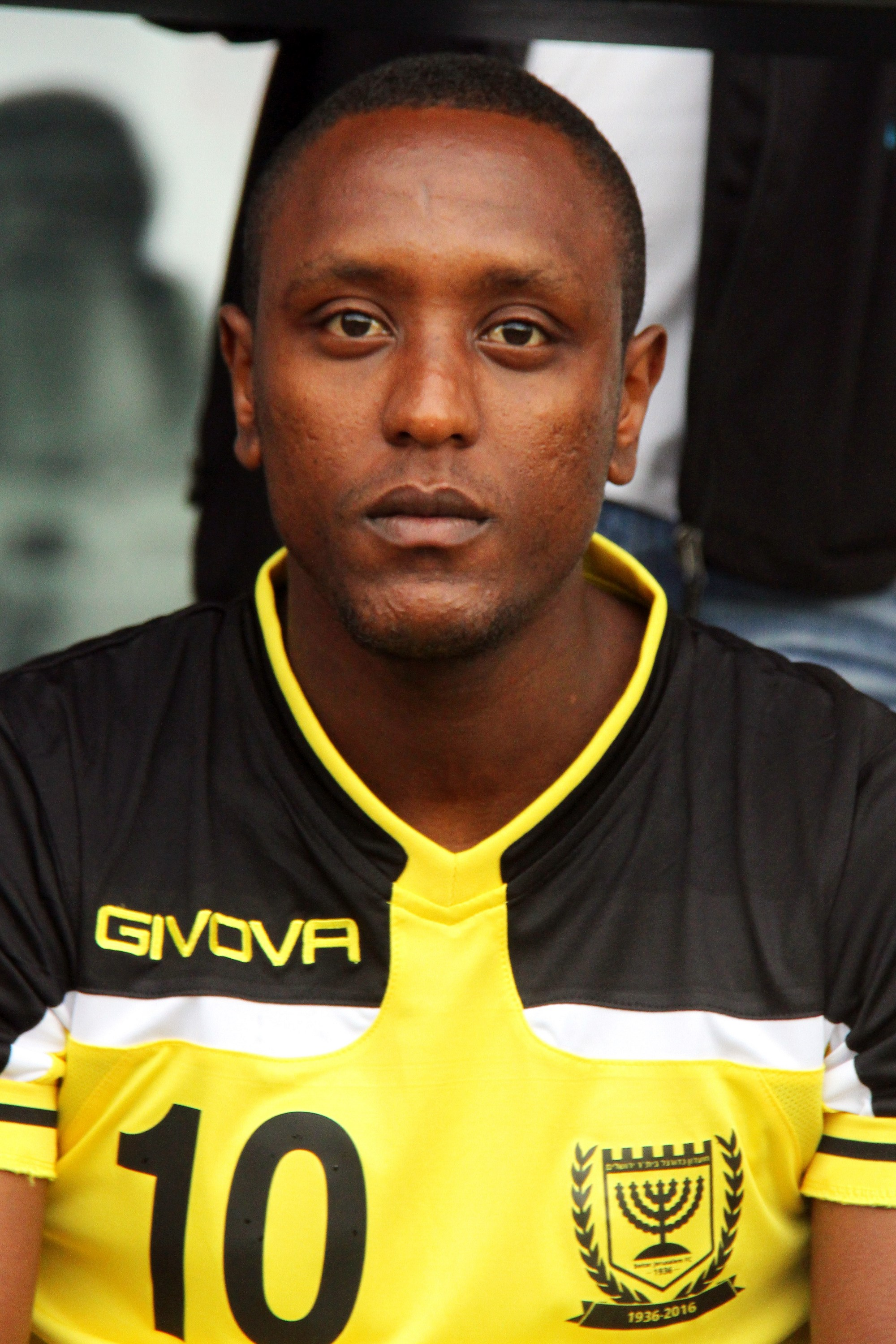
- Preda with Beitar Jerusalem in 2016

Personal information
- Full name: Daniel "Dani" Preda
- Date of birth: 1 April 1987 (age 39)
- Place of birth: Petah Tikva, Israel
- Height: 1.77 m (5 ft 10 in)
- Position: Attacking midfielder

Team information
- Current team: Bnei Yehud
- Number: 19

Youth career
- 1994–2007: Maccabi Petah Tikva

Senior career*
Years	Team	Apps	(Gls)
2005–2014	Maccabi Petah Tikva	142	(14)
2014–2017	Beitar Jerusalem	36	(0)
2016	→ Hapoel Bnei Lod (loan)	7	(0)
2017–2018	Maccabi Herzliya	8	(1)
2018	F.C. Kafr Qasim	13	(1)
2018–2019	Hapoel Mahane Yehuda	10	(0)
2019–2022	Maccabi Amishav Petah Tikva	71	(10)
2022–2023	Hakoah Amidar Ramat Gan	13	(2)
2023–2024	Beitar Petah Tikva	7	(1)
2024	→ Inter Aliyah Tel Aviv	11	(0)
2025–	Bnei Yehud	2	(0)
- * Club domestic league appearances and goals as of 1 January 2025

Danny Preda (Hebrew: דני פרדה; born 1 April 1987) is an Israeli footballer who currently plays as a midfielder for Bnei Yehud in the Liga Gimel.
