= Itzik Cohen (footballer, born 1990) =

Israeli footballer

Itzik Cohen איציק כהן
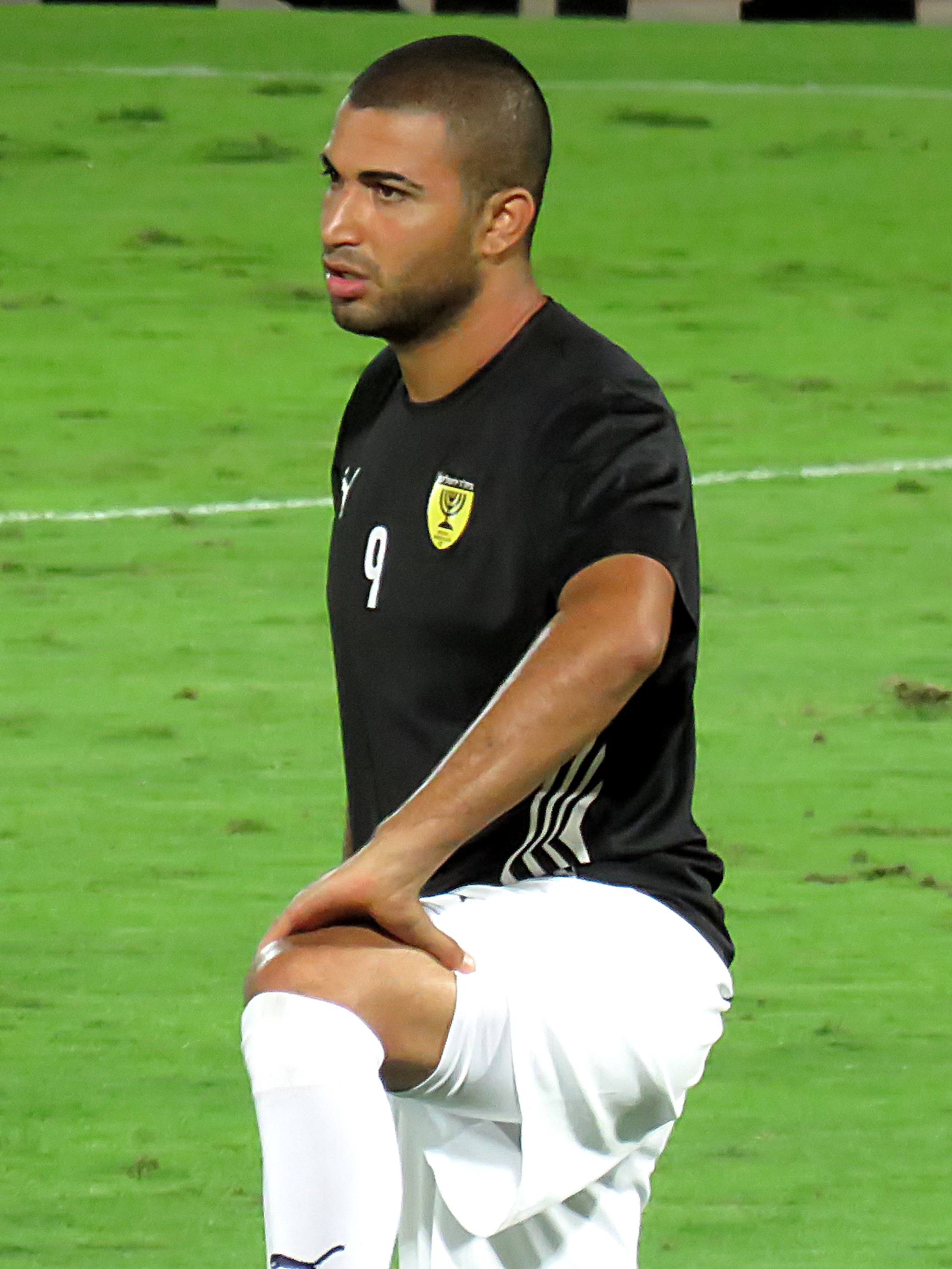
- Cohen playing for Beitar Jerusalem in 2015

Personal information
- Full name: Itzhak Cohen
- Date of birth: January 1, 1990 (age 36)
- Place of birth: Jerusalem, Israel
- Height: 1.78 m (5 ft 10 in)
- Position: Striker

Youth career
- 2006–2008: Hapoel Jerusalem
- 2008–2010: Beitar Jerusalem

Senior career*
Years	Team	Apps	(Gls)
2010–2013	Hapoel Jerusalem	98	(29)
2010–2011	→ F.C. Ashdod (loan)	5	(0)
2011	→ Hakoah Amidar Ramat Gan (loan)	4	(0)
2013–2016	Beitar Jerusalem	61	(15)
2016	Maccabi Netanya	11	(0)
2016–2017	Hapoel Katamon	32	(10)
2017–2018	Maccabi Herzliya	8	(0)
2019	Hapoel Jerusalem	0	(0)
2019–2020	Bnei Eilat	17	(9)
- * Club domestic league appearances and goals

Itzik Cohen (Hebrew: איציק כהן; born January 1, 1990) is a former Israeli footballer who plays as a striker.
