= Ben Rahav =

Israeli footballer

Ben Rahav בן רהב
Personal information
- Full name: Ben Rahav
- Date of birth: April 29, 1989 (age 37)
- Place of birth: Even Yehuda, Israel
- Position: Goalkeeper

Youth career
- 2003–2004: Beitar Nes Tubruk
- 2004–2010: Maccabi Haifa

Senior career*
Years	Team	Apps	(Gls)
2010	Maccabi Ironi Kfar Yona	4	(0)
2010–2011	Sektzia Ness Ziona	6	(0)
2011–2012	Hapoel Kfar Saba	33	(1)
2012–2014	Ironi Nir Ramat HaSharon	4	(0)
2014	Beitar Tel Aviv Ramla	33	(0)
2014–2015	Beitar Jerusalem	1	(0)
2015–2016	Hapoel Kfar Saba	6	(0)
2016–2017	Maccabi Sha'arayim	9	(0)
- * Club domestic league appearances and goals

Ben Rahav (Hebrew: בן רהב; born 29 April 1989) is a former Israeli footballer.
