= Tomer Swisa =

Israeli footballer

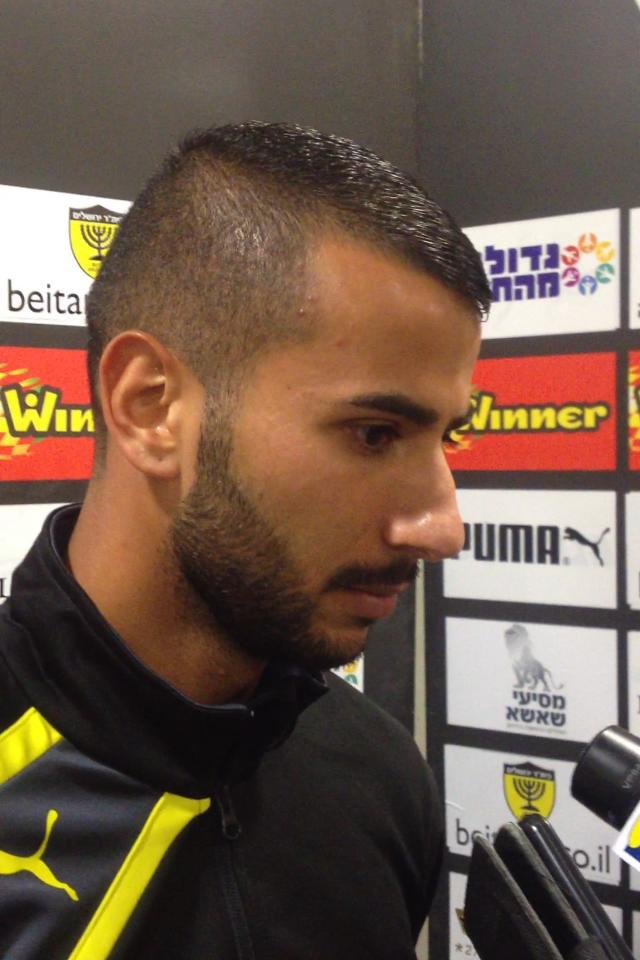
- Swisa in 2015.

Personal information
- Full name: Tomer Swisa
- Date of birth: December 21, 1988 (age 37)
- Place of birth: Beit She'an, Israel
- Height: 5 ft 11 in (1.80 m)
- Position: Forward

Youth career
- Ironi Kiryat Shmona

Senior career*
Years	Team	Apps	(Gls)
2006–2011	Hapoel Ironi Kiryat Shmona	71	(17)
2011–2012	Ironi Ramat HaSharon	28	(10)
2012–2015	Hapoel Be'er Sheva	63	(15)
2014–2015	→ Beitar Jerusalem (loan)	16	(3)
2015–2016	Hapoel Haifa	29	(5)
2016–2017	Hapoel Ashkelon	18	(2)
2017–2018	Hapoel Ra'anana	17	(2)
2018–2019	Hapoel Afula	25	(2)
2019–2020	Hapoel Nof HaGalil	27	(4)
2020–2021	F.C. Daburiyya	15	(4)
2021	→ Hapoel Migdal HaEmek	3	(0)
2021	→Hapoel Beit She'an	3	(0)

International career
2010	Israel U21	2	(0)
- * Club domestic league appearances and goals

Tomer Swisa (Hebrew: תומר סוויסה) is a former Israeli footballer.

== Honours ==
- Toto Cup Al
  - 2010–11
- Toto Cup Leumit
  - 2009–10
- Liga Leumit
  - 2009–10
