= Ran Rol =

Israeli footballer

Personal information
- Full name: Ran Rol
- Date of birth: November 17, 1987 (age 38)
- Place of birth: Karmi'el, Israel
- Position: Attacking midfielder

Team information
- Current team: Hapoel Bik'at HaYarden

Youth career
- Hapoel Haifa

Senior career*
Years	Team	Apps	(Gls)
2005–2009	Hapoel Haifa	24	(0)
2006–2007	Hapoel Makar (loan)	24	(7)
2007–2008	Maccabi Ironi Kiryat Ata (loan)	29	(7)
2009–2010	Hapoel Ironi Kiryat Shmona	7	(1)
2010	Hapoel Nazareth Illit	10	(1)
2010–2011	Maccabi Ahi Nazareth	32	(4)
2011–2012	Bnei Sakhnin	20	(0)
2012–2013	Hapoel Nazareth Illit	38	(11)
2013–2015	Maccabi Netanya	53	(4)
2015–2016	Hapoel Ramat Gan	36	(6)
2016–2017	Ironi Nesher	37	(2)
2017–2018	Maccabi Herzliya	32	(2)
2018–2019	Hapoel Umm al-Fahm	24	(6)
2019–2020	Nordia Jerusalem	15	(1)
2020–2021	F.C. Tira	26	(9)
2021–2022	Ironi Tiberias	33	(5)
2022	Tzeirei Tayibe	14	(0)
2023	Ironi Modi'in	15	(2)
2023–2024	F.C. HaMakhtesh Giv'atayim	20	(1)
2024–	Hapoel Bik'at HaYarden	0	(0)
- * Club domestic league appearances and goals as of 1 June 2024

Ran Rol (Hebrew: רן רול) is an Israeli footballer currently playing for Hapoel Bik'at HaYarden.

== Honours ==
- Liga Leumit
  - Winner (1): 2013–14
- Israel State Cup
  - Runner-up (1): 2014
