= Hanan Maman =

Israeli footballer

Hanan Maman חנן ממן
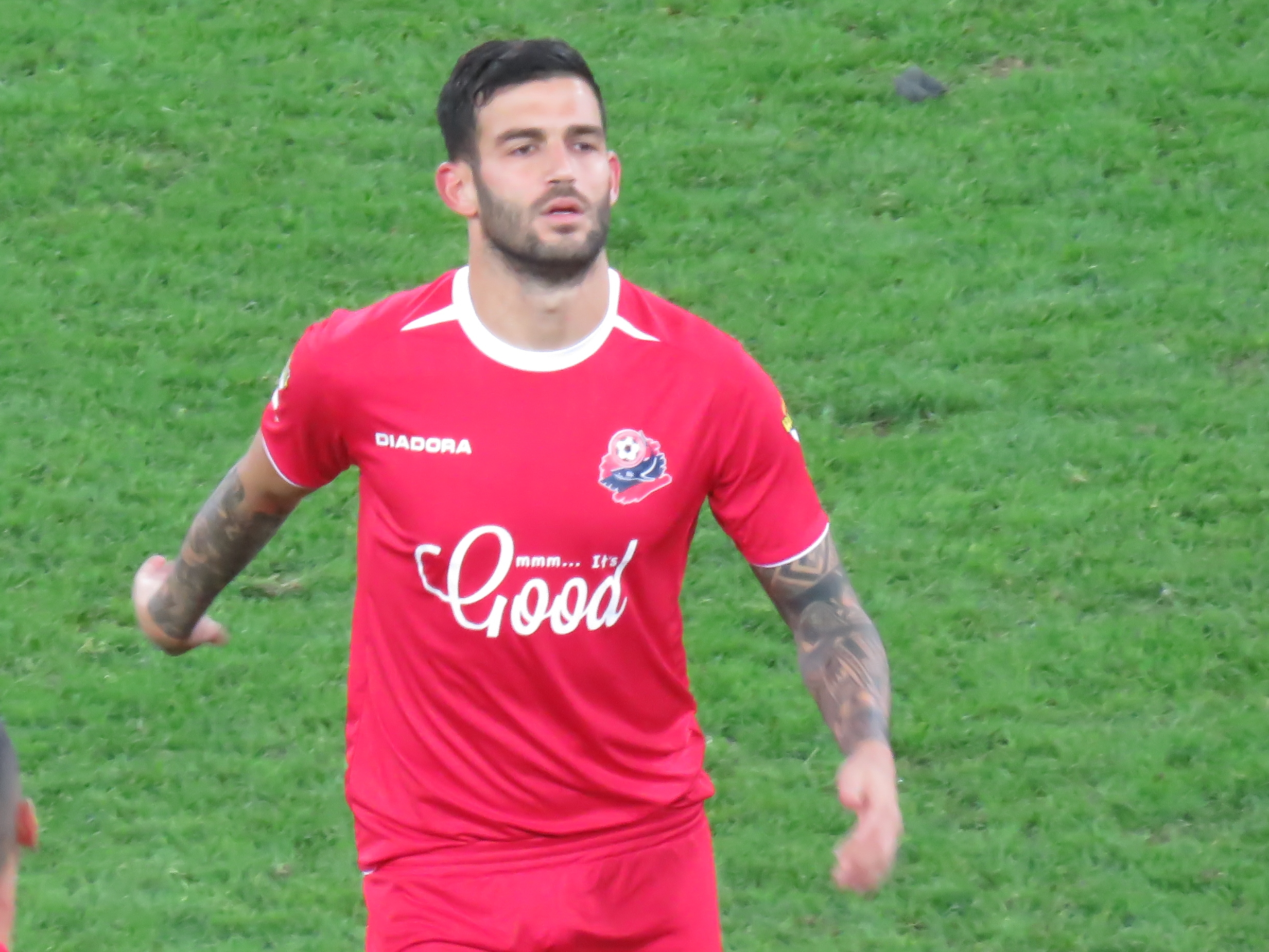
- Maman in 2016

Personal information
- Full name: Hanan Maman (Kang Maman)
- Date of birth: 28 August 1989 (age 37)
- Place of birth: Haifa, Israel
- Position: Midfielder

Youth career
- Hapoel Haifa

Senior career*
Years	Team	Apps	(Gls)
2008–2013	Hapoel Haifa	77	(9)
2012–2013	→ Hapoel Tel Aviv (loan)	32	(3)
2013–2014	Waasland-Beveren	12	(0)
2014–2015	Beitar Jerusalem	34	(5)
2015–2018	Hapoel Haifa	78	(10)
2018–2020	Hapoel Be'er Sheva	58	(13)
2020	Beitar Jerusalem	14	(1)
2020–2023	Hapoel Haifa	84	(16)

International career
2007–2008	Israel U19	15	(1)
2018	Israel	1	(0)
- * Club domestic league appearances and goals as of 16 May 2023

Hanan Maman (Hebrew: חנן ממן; born 28 August 1989) is an Israeli former professional footballer who played as a midfielder. Hanan Maman is the son of former footballer Baruch Maman.

== Career statistics ==
As of 23 November 2014

Appearances and goals by club, season and competition
Club	Season	League			National Cup		League Cup		Europe		Total	
Club	Season	Division	Apps	Goals	Apps	Goals	Apps	Goals	Apps	Goals	Apps	Goals
Hapoel Haifa	2008–09	Liga Leumit	7	1	0	0	3	0	0	0	10	1
Hapoel Haifa	2009–10	Israeli Premier League	13	0	1	0	6	1	0	0	20	1
Hapoel Haifa	2010–11	Israeli Premier League	29	6	3	1	6	0	0	0	38	7
Hapoel Haifa	2011–12	Israeli Premier League	35	3	1	0	3	0	0	0	39	3
Hapoel Tel Aviv (loan)	2012–13	Israeli Premier League	32	3	2	0	1	0	7	4	42	7
Waasland-Beveren	2013–14	Belgian Pro League	12	0	1	1	0	0	-	-	13	1
Beitar Jerusalem	2014–15	Israeli Premier League	32	5	1	0	3	0	0	0	36	5
Hapoel Haifa	2015–16	Israeli Premier League	29	0	2	1	4	1	0	0	35	2
Hapoel Haifa	2016–17	Israeli Premier League	31	6	4	6	7	4	0	0	42	16
Hapoel Haifa	2017–18	Israeli Premier League	18	4	1	1	4	0	0	0	23	5
Hapoel Be'er Sheva	2017–18	Israeli Premier League	14	8	2	0	0	0	0	0	16	8
Hapoel Be'er Sheva	2018–19	Israeli Premier League	28	5	3	0	1	0	6	2	38	7
Hapoel Be'er Sheva	2019–20	Israeli Premier League	16	0	2	2	1	0	1	0	20	2
Beitar Jerusalem	2019–20	Israeli Premier League	13	1	1	1	0	0	0	0	14	2
Hapoel Haifa	2020–21	Israeli Premier League	27	8	2	1	0	0	0	0	29	9
Hapoel Haifa	2021–22	Israeli Premier League	28	6	3	2	4	0	0	0	35	8
Hapoel Haifa	2022–23	Israeli Premier League	0	0	0	0	2	0	0	0	2	0
Total			364	56	29	16	45	6	14	6	452	84

== Honours ==
Hapoel Be'er Sheva

- Israeli Premier League: 2017–18

Individual

- Israeli Footballer of the Year: 2017–18
