= Shmulik Malul =

Israeli footballer

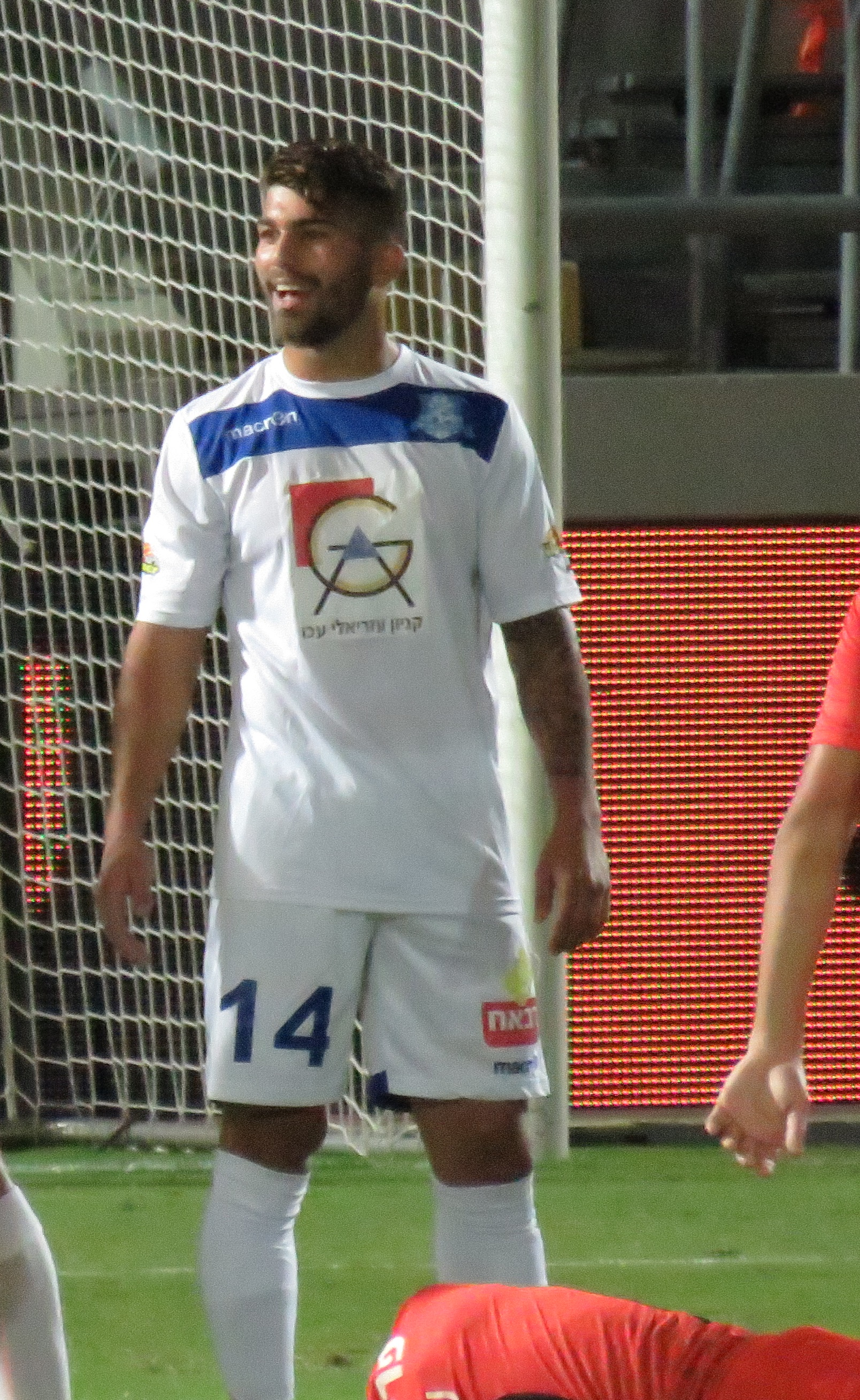
- Malul playing for Hapoel Acre in 2015

Personal information
- Full name: Shmuel Malul
- Date of birth: April 3, 1993 (age 33)
- Place of birth: Yanuv, Israel
- Height: 1.75 m (5 ft 9 in)
- Position: Left-back

Team information
- Current team: Hapoel Ramat Gan

Youth career
- 2002–2004: Hapoel Pardesiya
- 2004–2005: Maccabi Emek Hefer
- 2005–2013: Beitar Nes Tubruk

Senior career*
Years	Team	Apps	(Gls)
2013–2014	Maccabi Petah Tikva	16	(0)
2014–2015	Beitar Jerusalem	10	(0)
2015–2016	Hapoel Acre	31	(0)
2016–2017	Maccabi Petah Tikva	2	(0)
2017–2018	Hapoel Ramat Gan	28	(0)
- * Club domestic league appearances and goals

Shmuel "Shmulik" Malul (Hebrew: שמואל "שמוליק" מלול; born 3 April 1993) is an Israeli footballer who plays as a left-back for Israeli club Hapoel Ramat Gan.
