= Mor Shaked =

Israeli footballer

Mor Shaked מור שקד
Personal information
- Full name: Mor Shaked
- Date of birth: December 23, 1986 (age 39)
- Place of birth: Hod HaSharon, Israel
- Position: Midfielder

Team information
- Current team: Hapoel Mahane Yehuda

Youth career
- Hapoel Ra'anana

Senior career*
Years	Team	Apps	(Gls)
2005–2008	Hapoel Ra'anana	6	(2)
2005–2006	→ Hapoel Hod HaSharon	?	(?)
2006–2007	→ Ironi Ramat HaSharon	8	(0)
2008–2010	Beitar Shimshon Tel Aviv	55	(2)
2010–2011	Maccabi Be'er Sheva	24	(3)
2011–2012	Sektzia Ness Ziona	33	(4)
2012–2014	Hapoel Rishon LeZion	47	(2)
2014–2015	Beitar Jerusalem	2	(0)
2015	Hapoel Bnei Lod	13	(1)
2015–2016	Maccabi Petah Tikva	1	(0)
2016–2017	Hapoel Petah Tikva	16	(3)
2017	Maccabi Herzliya	14	(3)
2017–2018	Hapoel Rishon LeZion	23	(3)
2018–2019	Hapoel Petah Tikva	8	(0)
2019	Hapoel Umm al-Fahm	9	(0)
2019–2020	Maccabi Yavne	11	(0)
2020	F.C. Holon Yermiyahu	6	(0)
2020–2022	Hapoel Hod HaSharon	34	(10)
2022	→ Hapoel Qalansawe	9	(4)
2022	Hapoel Qalansawe	6	(1)
2022–2023	Hapoel Hod HaSharon	13	(1)
2023–2025	Hapoel 1928 Kfar Saba	54	(17)
2025–	Hapoel Mahane Yehuda	0	(0)
- * Club domestic league appearances and goals as of 30 July 2025

Mor Shaked (Hebrew: מור שקד; born 23 December 1986) is an Israeli footballer who currently plays for Hapoel Mahane Yehuda.
