= Ben Malka =

Israeli footballer

Ben Malka בן מלכה
Personal information
- Full name: Ben Malka
- Date of birth: December 6, 1989 (age 36)
- Place of birth: Haifa, Israel
- Position: Midfielder

Team information
- Current team: Maccabi Tzur Shalom

Youth career
- F.C. Neve Yosef

Senior career*
Years	Team	Apps	(Gls)
2008–2011	Hapoel Kfar Saba	55	(5)
2011–2012	Ironi Nir Ramat HaSharon	26	(1)
2012–2014	Hapoel Ra'anana	42	(3)
2014	Maccabi Netanya	12	(0)
2014–2015	Beitar Jerusalem	3	(0)
2015–2016	Hapoel Petah Tikva	32	(5)
2016–2017	Maccabi Herzliya	27	(0)
2017–2019	Hapoel Iksal	41	(4)
2019	Hapoel Ashkelon	12	(0)
2019	Hapoel Umm al-Fahm	1	(0)
2019	Hapoel Baqa al-Gharbiyye	2	(0)
2019–2020	Hapoel Kafr Kanna	11	(0)
2020–2021	Maccabi Ironi Kiryat Ata	21	(1)
2021–2023	Maccabi Neve Sha'anan	49	(3)
2023–2024	Karmel Haifa	4	(2)
- * Club domestic league appearances and goals

Ben Malka (Hebrew: בן מלכה) is an Israeli former footballer.

== Honours ==
- Liga Leumit
  - 2013–14
