= 2017–18 Beitar Jerusalem F.C. season =

Beitar Jerusalem F.C.
2017–18 season
- Chairman: Eli Ohana
- Manager: Sharon Mimer; Benny Ben Zaken
- Stadium: Teddy Stadium
- Ligat Ha'Al: 3rd
- State Cup: Runner-up
- Europa League: Second qualifying round
- Toto Cup: Quarter-finals
- Top goalscorer: League: Itay Shechter & Claudemir (9 goals); All: Gaëtan Varenne (16 goals)
- Highest home attendance: 25,500 vs. (Israel) Hapoel Be'er Sheva (5 May 2018)
- Lowest home attendance: 1,500 vs. (Israel) Hapoel Haifa (21 May 2018)
- Average home league attendance: 10,493
Home colours	Away colours

The 2017–18 season is Beitar Jerusalem 81st season since its establishment in 1936, and 70th since the establishment of the State of Israel. During the 2017–18 campaign the club have competed in the Israeli Premier League, State Cup, Toto Cup, UEFA Europa League. In the end of the previous season the association of Israeli football decide that The owner Tabib can't manage the team for 2 years, because his involvement in criminal case. In 28 May the owner Eli Tabib announced the joining of the biggest legend of Beitar Eli Ohana to the chairman. Within the preparations of the season, Beitar signed the players: Georginho, Amir Agayev, Zion Tzemah, Miki Siroshtein, Gaëtan Varenne, Or Va'aknin, and one of the successful Israeli players of all times, Yossi Benayoun.

== Current squad ==
As of 18 January 2018

Note: Flags indicate national team as defined under FIFA eligibility rules; some limited exceptions apply. Players may hold more than one non-FIFA nationality.

No.	Pos.	Nation	Player
1	GK	ISR	Boris Klaiman
2	DF	FRA	Antoine Conte
3	MF	ISR	David Keltjens
6	DF	ISR	Tal Kachila
7	FW	SVK	Jakub Sylvestr
8	MF	ISR	Idan Vered
9	FW	ISR	Itay Shechter (Captain)
10	MF	BRA	Georginho
12	MF	ISR	Or Va'aknin
13	DF	ISR	Sean Goldberg
14	MF	BRA	Claudemir

No.	Pos.	Nation	Player
16	DF	ISR	Hen Dilmoni
18	MF	ISR	Hen Ezra
19	DF	ISR	Ofer Verta
20	DF	ISR	Miki Siroshtein
21	FW	DEN	David Boysen
22	GK	ISR	Stav Shushan
23	DF	GER	Marcel Heister
24	MF	ISR	Ofir Kriaf
25	FW	FRA	Gaëtan Varenne
52	MF	SVK	Erik Sabo(on loan from PAOK FC)
77	MF	ISR	Ya'akov Berihon

== Transfers ==
=== Summer ===
In:

No.	Pos.	Nation	Player
6	DF	ISR	Tal Kachila (loan return from Bnei Yehuda)
7	MF	ISR	Amir Agayev (from Bnei Yehuda)
10	MF	BRA	Georginho (from Bnei Sakhnin)
27	MF	ISR	Zion Tzemah (from Hapoel Acre)
4	DF	ISR	Miki Siroshtein (from F.C. Ashdod)
25	FW	ISR	Gaëtan Varenne (from Hapoel Jerusalem)
2	DF	FRA	Antoine Conte (from (France) Reims, previously loaned)
15	MF	ISR	Yossi Benayoun (from Maccabi Tel Aviv)
5	MF	CIV	Paul Edgar Akoukou (loan from (Finland) Ekenäs IF, later bought)
13	DF	ISR	Sean Goldberg (loan from Maccabi Tel Aviv)
—	DF	ISR	Ofer Verta (from Hapoel Tel Aviv)

Out:

No.	Pos.	Nation	Player
11	MF	ISR	Dan Einbinder (to Hapoel Be'er Sheva)
4	DF	ESP	Jesús Rueda (to (Cyprus) APOEL)
26	FW	ISR	Shlomi Avisidris (to Hapoel Rishon LeZion)
27	DF	ISR	Oz Raly (to Hapoel Ashkelon)
7	MF	ISR	Yisrael Zaguri (to Bnei Sakhnin)
21	MF	ISR	Kobi Moyal (to (United States) New York Cosmos)
5	DF	ISR	Dan Mori (to Bnei Yehuda)
12	FW	ISR	Avishay Cohen (loan to Beitar Tel Aviv Ramla)
10	MF	ISR	Danny Preda (to Maccabi Herzliya)

=== Winter ===
In:

No.	Pos.	Nation	Player
—	MF	ISR	Ofir Kriaf (from Ironi Kiryat Shmona)
—	MF	CIV	Paul Akouokou (from (Finland) Ekenäs IF, previously loaned)
—	FW	ISR	David Boysen (from (Denmark) Lyngby BK)
—	FW	SVK	Jakub Sylvestr (from (Denmark) AaB)

Out:

No.	Pos.	Nation	Player
—	MF	ISR	Amir Agayev (to Hapoel Tel Aviv)
—	MF	ISR	Yossi Benayoun (to Maccabi Petah Tikva)
—	MF	ISR	Zion Tzemah (on loan to Hapoel Ashkelon)
—	MF	CIV	Paul Akouokou (on loan to Hapoel Rishon LeZion)
—	FW	ISR	Dekel Cohen (on loan to Hapoel Jerusalem)

== Pre-season and friendlies ==
18 June 2017 Training Camp	Vasas SC (Hungary)	2–1	(Israel) Beitar Jerusalem
	Kulcsár 3'; Remili 63' (pen.)		Shechter 80'

21 June 2017 Training Camp	Ferencvárosi (Hungary)	1–0	(Israel) Beitar Jerusalem	Budapest, Hungary
	Bognár 90+3'			Stadium: Groupama Arena

6 September 2017	Beitar Jerusalem (Israel)	2–0	(Israel) Hapoel Rishon LeZion	Jerusalem, Israel
	Georginho; Agayev	Report

11 October 2017	Hapoel Marmorek (Israel)	0–1	(Israel) Beitar Jerusalem	Rehovot, Israel
		Report	Dilmoni 33'	Stadium: Itztoni Stadium

== Competitions ==
=== Ligat Ha'Al ===
==== Results ====
20 August 2017 1	Maccabi Tel Aviv	0 – 3	Beitar Jerusalem	Netanya
21:00 IDT		Summary; Report (Hebrew)	Shechter 10', 34'; Vered 90'	Stadium: Netanya Stadium; Attendance: 11,325; Referee: Liran Liany

28 August 2017 2	Beitar Jerusalem	4 – 1	Ashdod	Petah Tikva
20:30 IDT	Georginho 24'; Benayoun 55'; Berihon 81'; Varenne 85'	Summary; Report (Hebrew)	Genev 15'	Stadium: HaMoshava Stadium (Note: Beitar Jerusalem hosted their UEFA Europa League home matches and the regular season round 2 outside Jerusalem, due to the 2017 Maccabiah Games and reseeding of the grass at Teddy Stadium.); Attendance: 11,000; Referee: Roi Reinshreiber

11 September 2017 3	Maccabi Petah Tikva	1 – 2	Beitar Jerusalem	Petah Tikva
21:00 IDT	Romário 26' (pen.)	Summary; Report (Hebrew)	Georginho 18'; Heister 78'	Stadium: HaMoshava Stadium; Attendance: 8,000; Referee: Alon Yefet

16 September 2017 4	Beitar Jerusalem	3 – 3	Hapoel Haifa	Jerusalem
20:30 IDT	Vered 22', 39'; Georginho 66'	Summary; Report (Hebrew)	Ben Basat 17', 27', 90+4'	Stadium: Teddy Stadium; Attendance: 15,000; Referee: Ziv Adler

25 September 2017 5	Beitar Jerusalem	1 – 1	Ironi Kiryat Shmona	Jerusalem
20:30 IDT	Claudemir 8'	Summary; Report (Hebrew)	Gozlan 48'	Stadium: Teddy Stadium; Attendance: 10,500; Referee: Menashe Mashiah

1 October 2017 6	Bnei Sakhnin	3 – 2	Beitar Jerusalem	Acre
21:00 IDT	Azulay 4'; Ottman 63'; Mugrabi 68'	Summary; Report (Hebrew)	Ezra 37'; Benayoun 90+3'	Stadium: Acre Municipal Stadium; Attendance: 1,500; Referee: Eli Hachmon

16 October 2017 7	Beitar Jerusalem	4 – 1	Maccabi Netanya	Jerusalem
21:00 IDT	Shechter 17'; Claudemir 74' (pen.); Vered 75'; Benayoun 90+3'	Summary; Report (Hebrew)	Keita 57'	Stadium: Teddy Stadium; Attendance: 12,500; Referee: Gal Leibowitz

21 October 2017 8	Maccabi Haifa	1 - 2	Beitar Jerusalem	Haifa
20:30	Allyson (yellow card) 42'; Ben Harush (yellow card) 49'; Kostadinov (yellow card) 84'; Athanasiadis 90+5'	Report	Shechter 45'; Allyson 65' (o.g.); Paul Edgar (yellow card) 78'; Klaiman (yellow card) 90'	Stadium: Sammy Ofer Stadium; Attendance: 28,114; Referee: Eitan Shmuelevitz

28 October 2017 9	Beitar Jerusalem	2 - 0	Hapoel Ashkelon	Jerusalem
20:30	Shechter 5'; Ezra 38'	Summary		Stadium: Teddy Stadium; Attendance: 9,500; Referee: Zvika Levi

4 November 2017 10	Bnei Yehuda	3 - 2	Beitar Jerusalem	Petah Tikva
20:30	Buzaglo 22' (yellow card) 52' (goal) 60'; Valskis (yellow card) 89' (goal) 90'	Summary	Claudemir 33' (pen.); Paul Edgar Akoukou (yellow card) 42'; Kachila 44'; Shechter (yellow card) 49'; Verta (yellow card) 85'	Stadium: HaMoshava Stadium; Attendance: 9,100; Referee: Igal Frid

27 November 2017 11	Beitar Jerusalem	2 - 2	Hapoel Be'er Sheva	Jerusalem
21:00	Heister 52'; Sabo 90+2'	Summary	Nwakaeme 54'; Melikson 62'	Stadium: Teddy Stadium; Attendance: 22,434; Referee: Liran Liani

2 December 2017 12	Hapoel Acre	1 - 3	Beitar Jerusalem	Acre
	Zino 12'	Summary	Shechter 9'; Kachila 36'; Varenne 90'	Stadium: Acre Municipal Stadium; Attendance: 4,500; Referee: Igal Frid

9 December 2017 13	Beitar Jerusalem	3 - 2	Hapoel Ra'anana	Jerusalem
	Varenne 27'; Shechter 35'; Claudemir 58' (pen.)	Summary	Abuhatzira 45' (pen.); Faucher 62'	Stadium: Teddy Stadium; Attendance: 7,500; Referee: Erez Papir

18 December 2017 14	Beitar Jerusalem	1 - 2	Maccabi Tel Aviv	Jerusalem
	Claudemir 55'	Summary	Rikan 1'; Blackman 42'	Stadium: Teddy Stadium; Attendance: 24,232; Referee: Eitan Shmuelevich

23 December 2017 15	Ashdod	1 - 3	Beitar Jerusalem	Ashdod
	Elke 10'	Summary	Siroshtein 36'; Claudemir 45+2'; Tzemah 85'	Stadium: Yud-Alef Stadium; Attendance: 5,000; Referee: Zvika Levi

30 December 2017 16	Beitar Jerusalem	1 - 0	Maccabi Petah Tikva	Jerusalem
	Berihon 69'	Summary		Stadium: Teddy Stadium; Attendance: 8,500; Referee: Ziv Adler

8 January 2018 17	Hapoel Haifa	0 - 2	Beitar Jerusalem	Haifa
		Summary	Varenne 33'; Ezra 59'	Stadium: Sammy Ofer Stadium; Attendance: 12,000; Referee: Eli Hackmon

13 January 2018 18	Ironi Kiryat Shmona	1 - 1	Beitar Jerusalem	Kiryat Shmona
	Lako 3'	Summary	Claudemir 21'	Stadium: Kiryat Shmona Municipal Stadium; Attendance: 5,000; Referee: Eitan Shmuelevich

22 January 2018 19	Beitar Jerusalem	4 - 2	Bnei Sakhnin	Jerusalem
	Kriaf 42'; Varenne 47'; Ezra 52'; Heister 68'	Summary	Ataa 4'; Klaiman 37' (o.g.)	Stadium: Teddy Stadium; Attendance: 13,000; Referee: Erez Papir

29 January 2018 20	Maccabi Netanya	2 - 1	Beitar Jerusalem	Netanya
	Levi 6'; Heubach 35'	Summary	Varenne 89'	Stadium: Netanya Stadium; Attendance: 11,000; Referee: Eli Hackmon

3 February 2018 21	Beitar Jerusalem	3 - 1	Maccabi Haifa	Jerusalem
	Varenne 45+1'; Sabo 53'; Shechter 69'	Summary	Mizrachi 35'	Stadium: Teddy Stadium; Attendance: 11,300; Referee: Ziv Adler

10 February 2018 22	Hapoel Ashkelon	1 - 3	Beitar Jerusalem	Ashkelon
	Jovanović 56'	Summary	Claudemir 64'; Varenne 87'; Sabo 89'	Stadium: Sala Stadium; Attendance: 6,000; Referee: Liran Liani

19 February 2018 23	Beitar Jerusalem	2 - 0	Bnei Yehuda	Jerusalem
	Claudemir 72'; Sylvestr 90+1'	Summary		Stadium: Teddy Stadium; Attendance: 0 *Radius game without fans Referee: Shay Ben Avraam

25 February 2018 24	Hapoel Be'er Sheva	1-1	Beitar Jerusalem	Be'er Sheva
	Maman 31'	Summary	Sylvestr 60'	Stadium: Turner Stadium; Attendance: 15,700; Referee: Erez Papir

3 March 2018 25	Beitar Jerusalem	3-0	Hapoel Acre	Jerusalem
	Sabo 14' (pen.); Shechter 64'; Kriaf 84'	Summary		Stadium: Teddy Stadium; Attendance: 6,062; Referee: Orel Grinfeld

10 March 2018 26	Hapoel Ra'anana	0-2	Beitar Jerusalem	Netanya
		Report	Camara 45' (o.g.); Sylvestr 90'	Stadium: Netanya Stadium; Attendance: 5,280; Referee: Eitan Shmuelevich

==== League table ====
Pos	Team	Pld	W	D	L	GF	GA	GD	Pts	Qualification or relegation
1	Hapoel Be'er Sheva	26	17	6	3	43	18	+25	57	Qualification for the Championship round
2	Beitar Jerusalem	26	17	5	4	60	30	+30	56	Qualification for the Championship round
3	Maccabi Tel Aviv	26	16	7	3	44	20	+24	55	Qualification for the Championship round
4	Hapoel Haifa	26	15	7	4	36	21	+15	52	Qualification for the Championship round
5	Maccabi Netanya	26	12	9	5	43	29	+14	45	Qualification for the Championship round

Source: Israel Football Association, Soccerway
Rules for classification: 1) Points; 2) Goal difference; 3) Matches won; 4) Goals scored; 5) Head-to-head points; 6) Head-to-head goal difference; 7) Head-to-head goals scored; 8) Play-off.

==== Top playoff ====
17 March 2018 27	Beitar Jerusalem	2-0	Maccabi Netanya	Jerusalem
20:30 IST	Sylvestr 5'; Sabo 78' (pen.)	Report		Stadium: Teddy Stadium; Attendance: 10,200; Referee: Orel Greenfeld

4 April 2018 28	Hapoel Be'er Sheva	3-1	Beitar Jerusalem	Be'er Sheva
19:30 IST	Sahar 3'; Zrihan 39', 50'	Report	Sabo 53' (pen.)	Stadium: Turner Stadium; Attendance: 15,900; Referee: Ziv Adler

8 April 2017 29	Beitar Jerusalem	1-1	Bnei Yehuda	Jerusalem
20:55 IST	Vered 10'	Report	Gordana 53' (pen.)	Stadium: Teddy Stadium; Attendance: 6,870; Referee: Eli Hackmon

16 April 2018 30	Beitar Jerusalem	3-2	Maccabi Tel Aviv	Jerusalem
20:55 IST	Claudemir 29'; Ezra 34'; Sylvestr 42'	Report	Atzili 38' (pen.); Kjartansson 58'	Stadium: Teddy Stadium; Attendance: 11,900; Referee: Liran Liani

23 April 2018 31	Hapoel Haifa	0-1	Beitar Jerusalem	Haifa
20:55 IST		Report	Ezra 23'	Stadium: Sammy Ofer Stadium; Attendance: 7,700; Referee: Alon Yefet

30 April 2018 32	Maccabi Netanya	4-1	Beitar Jerusalem	Netanya
21:00 IST	Avraham 16'; Saba 31'; Kougbenya 42'; Heubach 81'	Report	Ezra 82'	Stadium: Netanya Stadium; Attendance: 10,500; Referee: Orel Greenfeld

5 May 2018 33	Beitar Jerusalem	1-4	Hapoel Be'er Sheva	Jerusalem
21:00 IST	Ezra 22'	Report	Elhamed 47'; Mamam 52'; Sahar 62'; Nwakaeme 74'	Stadium: Teddy Stadium; Attendance: 25,500; Referee: Alon Yefet

12 May 2018 34	Bnei Yehuda	3-3	Beitar Jerusalem	Petah Tikva
20:15 IST	Gordana 52' (pen.); Tchibota 53'; Cohen 78'	Report	Kachila 20'; Vered 45+1' (pen.); Sylvestr 60'	Stadium: HaMoshava Stadium; Attendance: 1,300; Referee: Ziv Adler

15 May 2018 35	Maccabi Tel Aviv	3-1	Beitar Jerusalem	Netanya
20:55 IST	Rikan 8'; Davidzada 31'; Blackman 37' (pen.)	Report	Kachila 64'	Stadium: Netanya Stadium; Attendance: 6,595; Referee: Idan Layba

21 May 2018 36	Beitar Jerusalem	1-1	Hapoel Haifa	Jerusalem
21:00 IST	Kriaf 59'	Report	Ginsari 63'	Stadium: Teddy Stadium; Attendance: 1,500; Referee: Gal Laibovich

==== Top playoff table ====
Pos	Team	Pld	W	D	L	GF	GA	GD	Pts	Qualification
1	Hapoel Be'er Sheva (C)	36	24	8	4	70	27	+43	80	Qualification for the Champions League first qualifying round
2	Maccabi Tel Aviv	36	21	8	7	60	33	+27	71	Qualification for the Europa League first qualifying round
3	Beitar Jerusalem	36	20	8	8	75	51	+24	68	Qualification for the Europa League first qualifying round
4	Hapoel Haifa	36	17	11	8	48	39	+9	62	Qualification for the Europa League second qualifying round (Note: Hapoel Haifa qualified for the Europa League second qualifying round by winning the 2017–18 Israel State Cup.)
5	Maccabi Netanya	36	16	10	10	59	54	+5	58	
6	Bnei Yehuda Tel Aviv	36	13	10	13	47	41	+6	49	

Source: Israel Football Association, Soccerway
Rules for classification: 1) Points; 2) Goal difference; 3) Matches won; 4) Goals scored; 5) Head-to-head points; 6) Head-to-head goal difference; 7) Head-to-head goals scored; 8) Play-off.
(C) Champions

=== UEFA Europe League ===
==== First qualifying round ====
29 June 2017 First leg	Beitar Jerusalem (Israel)	4–3	(Hungary) Vasas	Petah Tikva, Israel
19:45 IDT	Georginho 19'; Benayoun 88'; Vered 90+1'; Sabo 90+2'	Report	Pavlov 36', 43'; Kulcsár 52'	Stadium: HaMoshava Stadium; Attendance: 0 (No-crowd radius match); Referee: Nenad Đokić (Serbia)

6 July 2017 Second leg	Vasas (Hungary)	0–3 (3–7 agg.)	(Israel) Beitar Jerusalem	Budapest, Hungary
20:30 CEST		Report	Ezra 10', 61'; Varenne 90+1'	Stadium: Szusza Ferenc stadion Referee: Fábio Veríssimo (Portugal)

==== Second qualifying round ====
13 July 2017 First leg	Beitar Jerusalem (Israel)	1–1	(Bulgaria) Botev Plovdiv	Petah Tikva, Israel
19:45 IDT	Kachila 11'	Report	Yusein 73'	Stadium: HaMoshava Stadium; Attendance: 9,450; Referee: Bartosz Frankowski (Poland)

20 July 2017 Second leg	Botev Plovdiv (Bulgaria)	4–0 (5–1 agg.)	(Israel) Beitar Jerusalem	Burgas, Bulgaria
20:30 EEST	Dimov 10'; Viana 32'; Baltanov 47'; Brisola 90'	Report		Stadium: Lazur Stadium; Attendance: 6,400; Referee: Kirill Levnikov (Russia)

=== State Cup ===
4 January 2018 Eight Round	Hapoel Rishon LeZion	1 – 2	Beitar Jerusalem	Rishon LeZion
21:00 IDT	Omri Shekel 19'	Report	Varenne 25', 42'	Stadium: Haberfeld Stadium; Attendance: 4,500; Referee: Daniel Bar Nathan

25 January 2018 Round of 16	Beitar Jerusalem	2 - 1	Hapoel Marmorek	Jerusalem
20:50	Varenne 19'; Varenne 25'	Report	Dyulgerov 32'	Stadium: Teddy Stadium; Attendance: 3,500; Referee: Daniel Bar Nathan

6 February 2018 Quarter-finals, 1st leg	Hapoel Kfar Saba	0 - 2	Beitar Jerusalem	Kfar Saba
20:50	Varenne 42'; Yazo 61' (o.g.)	Report		Stadium: Levita Stadium; Attendance: 4,500; Referee: Alon Yeffet

28 February 2018 Quarter-finals, 2nd leg	Beitar Jerusalem	0-0 (2-0 agg.)	Hapoel Kfar Saba	Jerusalem
20:50				Stadium: Teddy Stadium

1 April 2018 Semi-finals	Beitar Jerusalem	3-2	Hapoel Ironi Kiryat Shmona	Haifa
20:50	Sylvestr 53', 79'; Sabo 88' (pen.)	Report	Shaker 31'; Nachmias 90+4'	Stadium: Sammy Ofer Stadium; Attendance: 27,000; Referee: Erez Papir

9 May 2018 Final	Hapoel Haifa	3-1 (a.e.t.)	Beitar Jerusalem	Jerusalem
	Plakuschenko 28'; Scheimann 105'; Turgeman 120'	Report	Varenne 29'	Stadium: Teddy Stadium; Attendance: 31,000; Referee: Liran Liany

=== Toto Cup ===
==== Group stage ====
Pos	Team	Pld	W	D	L	GF	GA	GD	Pts	Qualification or relegation
1	Beitar Jerusalem	3	2	0	1	7	3	+4	6	Qualified to Quarter-finals
2	Hapoel Be'er Sheva	3	2	0	1	5	3	+2	6	Qualified to Quarter-finals
3	F.C. Ironi Ashdod	3	1	0	2	2	5	−3	3	
4	Hapoel Ashkelon	3	1	0	2	2	5	−3	3	

Updated to match(es) played on 12 August 2017. Source: Israel Football Association
Rules for classification: 1) points; 2) goal difference; 3) number of wins; 4) goals scored; 5) head to head; 6)deciding match.

30 July 2017 Group C	Ashdod	1–3	Beitar Jerusalem	Rishon LeZion
19:10 IDT	Abd Elhamed 44' (pen.)	Summary; Report (Hebrew)	Varenne 25', 81'; Benayoun 54'	Stadium: Haberfeld Stadium; Attendance: 500; Referee: Ziv Adler

6 August 2017 Group C	Hapoel Be'er Sheva	0–3	Beitar Jerusalem	Be'er Sheva
21:00 IDT		Summary; Report (Hebrew)	Keltjens 44'; Shechter 76', 82'	Stadium: Turner Stadium; Attendance: 11,800; Referee: Liran Liany

12 August 2017 Group C	Hapoel Ashkelon	1–2	Beitar Jerusalem	Rishon LeZion
21:00 IDT	Tzemah 63'	Summary; Report (Hebrew)	Haddad 16'; Ivančić 55'	Stadium: Haberfeld Stadium; Attendance: 1,500; Referee: Alon Yefet

==== Knockout stage ====
25 October 2017 Quarter-final	Ironi Kiryat Shmona	1-0	Beitar Jerusalem	Kiryat Shmona
	Gozlan 67'			Stadium: Kiryat Shmona Municipal Stadium; Attendance: 2,000; Referee: Igal Frid
