= 2020–21 F.C. Ashdod season =

Ashdod
2020-21 season
- Chairman: Municipality of Ashdod
- Manager: Ran Ben Shimon
- Stadium: Yud-Alef Stadium
- State Cup: Quarter Finals
- Toto Cup Al: 12th
Home colours	Away colours

Ashdod are an Israeli football club based in Ashdod. The 2020–21 season will the clubs 21st competitive campaign since the club were formed. During this season the club will have competed in the following competitions: Israeli Premier League, State Cup, Toto Cup Al.

== Current squad ==
Updated 12 July 2020.

No.	Pos.	Nation	Player
1	GK	ISR	Yoav Gerafi
3	DF	ISR	Gil Cohen
4	DF	UGA	Timothy Awany
5	DF	ISR	Nir Bardea
6	MF	ISR	Hamoudi Kna'an
7	FW	UGA	Fahad Bayo
8	MF	ISR	Shlomi Azulay
9	MF	ISR	Roei Gordana
10	MF	MLI	Moussa Bagayoko
11	FW	ISR	Sagiv Yehezkel
12	MF	ISR	Yoni Sisai
13	DF	GHA	Montari Kamaheni
14	FW	ISR	Dean David
15	DF	ISR	Tom Ben Zaken (captain)
16	DF	ISR	Zohar Zasno
18	FW	ISR	Bentzi Moshel

No.	Pos.	Nation	Player
19	FW	ISR	Stav Turiel
20	DF	ISR	Omri Ben Harush
21	MF	ISR	Hamza Mawassi
23	MF	ISR	Fares Abu Akel
41	GK	ISR	Ron Shushan
55	DF	SRB	Nenad Cvetković
66	MF	ISR	Nir Hasson
77	MF	ISR	Ya'akov Berihon
80	MF	ISR	Mor Edri
88	FW	ISR	Idan Dahan
90	GK	ISR	Roei Mishpati
99	FW	ISR	Oz Bilu
—	DF	ISR	David Tiram
—	FW	GHA	Hayford Adjei
—	FW	ISR	Shalev Harush

== Out on loan ==
No.	Pos.	Nation	Player
—	GK	ISR	Omer Egozi (at Hapoel Kfar Shalem until 30 June 2021)

== Competitions ==
=== Club Friendlies ===
28 July 2020 Friendly	Bnei Sakhnin	1 - 2	Ashdod	Sakhnin
19:00		Report		Stadium: Doha Stadium

=== Israeli Premier League ===
==== Results summary ====
Overall								Home						Away					
Pld	W	D	L	GF	GA	GD	Pts	W	D	L	GF	GA	GD	W	D	L	GF	GA	GD
17	9	1	7	24	17	+7	28	6	0	2	16	6	+10	3	1	5	8	11	−3

Last updated: 30 January 2021.
Source: Soccerway

===== Results by round =====
Round	1	2	3	4	5	6	7	8	9	10	11	12	13	14	15	16	17	18	19	20	21
Ground	H	A	H	A	A	H	H	A	H	A	A	H	A	H	A	H	A	H	A	H	A
Result	L	W	W	L	L	W	W	L	W	W	D	L	W		W	L	W	L			
Position	13	7	4	5	6	9	3	5	3	3	2	3	4		4	4	4	4			

Updated to match(es) played on 30 January 2021. Source: Liga I
A = Away; H = Home; W = Win; D = Draw; L = Loss

==== Matches ====
29 August 2020 1	Ashdod	0 - 2	Ironi Kiryat Shmona	Ashdod
19:00	Fares Abu Akel (yellow card) 38'; Ben Zaken (yellow card) 55'; Azulay (yellow card) 69'	Report	Lúcio Maranhão (yellow card) 65' (goal) 90+2'; Ansah 67' (yellow card) 74'; Kahat (yellow card) 72'; Bartkus (yellow card) 77'	Stadium: Yud-Alef Stadium; Attendance: 0 Referee: (Israel) Odeh Na'al

13 September 2020 2	Hapoel Tel Aviv	0 - 2	Ashdod	Tel Aviv
20:30	Gruper (yellow card) 77'; Boateng (yellow card) 85'	Report	Yehezkel 1'; Fares Abu Akel (yellow card) 12'; Awany (yellow card) 35'; Bayo (yellow card) 66'; Gordana 90+3'	Stadium: Bloomfield Stadium; Attendance: 0 Referee: (Israel) Erez Papir

21 September 2020 3	Ashdod	1 - 0	Maccabi Petah Tikva	Ashdod
19:00	Cvetković 23'; Fares Abu Akel (yellow card) 59'	Report	Elvis Sakyi (yellow card) 4'; Suljić (yellow card) 40'; Marcus Diniz (yellow card) 40'; Muhammad Sarsour (yellow card) 47'; Amit Meir (yellow card) 59'	Stadium: Yud-Alef Stadium; Attendance: 0 Referee: (Israel) Gal Laibuvitz

1 November 2020 4	Bnei Yehuda	1 - 0	Ashdod	Tel Aviv
20:30	Moussa (yellow card) 66'; Zenati 78' (pen.); Elian Ruhana (yellow card) 83'	Report	Idan Dahan (yellow card) 65'; Cvetković (red card) 90'	Stadium: Bloomfield Stadium; Attendance: 0 Referee: (Israel) Igal Frid

7 November 2020 5	Maccabi Haifa	2 - 1	Ashdod	Haifa
18:45	Planić (yellow card) 13'; Haziza (yellow card) 31'; Habshi (yellow card) 37'; Rukavytsya 45+3' (pen.); Chery 63'	Report	Bayo (yellow card) 9'; Bagayoko (yellow card) 45+1'; Gordana (yellow card) 45+1'; Yehezkel 70'	Stadium: Sammy Ofer Stadium; Attendance: 0 Referee: (Israel) David Fuxman

21 November 2020 6	Ashdod	2 - 0	Hapoel Be'er Sheva	Ashdod
18:45	Azulay 21' (yellow card) 37'; Yehezkel 26'; Gordana (yellow card) 48'; Nir Bardea (yellow card) 78'; Berihon (yellow card) 80'	Report	Dadia (yellow card) 24'	Stadium: Yud-Alef Stadium; Attendance: 0 Referee: (Israel) Liran Liany

25 November 2020 7	Ashdod	4 - 0	Maccabi Netanya	Ashdod
19:00	David 50' 71'; Ben Zaken (yellow card) 56'; Berihon (yellow card) 84'; Cvetković 87'; Azulay 88'	Report	Cohen (yellow card) 29'; Ido Vaier (yellow card) 55'; Avraham (yellow card) 67'; Kanichowsky (yellow card) 83' (yellow-red card) 83'	Stadium: Yud-Alef Stadium; Attendance: 0 Referee: (Israel) Odeh Na'al

28 November 2020 8	Bnei Sakhnin	1 - 0	Ashdod	Sakhnin
17:20	Ihab Ganayem 62'; Goldenberg (yellow card) 77'; Muhammad Ottman (yellow card) 78'	Report	Gordana (yellow card) 59'; Idan Dahan (yellow card) 90+1'	Stadium: Doha Stadium; Attendance: 0 Referee: (Israel) Idan Layba

7 December 2020 9	Ashdod	3 - 2	Maccabi Tel Aviv	Ashdod
20:00	Bayo 20'; Hamoudi Kna'an (yellow card) 23'; Gordana (yellow card) 53'; Azulay 69' (yellow card) 90'; Yehezkel 79' (yellow card) 83'	Report	Dor Peretz (yellow card) 19'; Luis Hernández 53' (yellow card) 87'; Cohen 61'	Stadium: Yud-Alef Stadium; Attendance: 0 Referee: (Israel) Snir Levi

12 December 2020 10	Hapoel Kfar Saba	0 - 1	Ashdod	Kfar Saba
15:00	Cohen (yellow card) 16'; Dror (yellow card) 57'; Solomon (yellow card) 85'; Reichert (yellow card) 90+3'	Report	Bagayoko 23' (yellow card) 34'; Ben Zaken (yellow card) 70'; Berihon (yellow card) 75'	Stadium: Levita Stadium; Attendance: 0 Referee: (Israel) Aviad Yahav-Hay Shiloach

19 December 2020 11	Hapoel Hadera	1 - 1	Ashdod	Netanya
17:20	Glazer (yellow card) 24'; Abdallah Jaber (yellow card) 44'; Khattab 60'; Cisse (yellow card) 68'; Avramov (yellow card) 90+1'	Report	Kamaheni 55'; Gordana (yellow card) 60'	Stadium: Netanya Stadium; Attendance: 0 Referee: (Israel) Shlomi Ben Avraham

22 December 2020 12	Ashdod	0 - 1	Hapoel Haifa	Ashdod
19:00	Bayo (yellow card) 47'; Yehezkel (yellow card) 53'	Report	Kapiloto (yellow card) 17'; Maman (yellow card) 62'; Buzaglo (yellow card) 83'; Barsky 86'; Kadoch (yellow card) 90'; Mishpati (yellow card) 90+9'	Stadium: Yud-Alef Stadium; Attendance: 0 Referee: (Israel) Eitan Shemeulevitch

28 December 2020 13	Beitar Jerusalem	1 – 2	Ashdod	Jerusalem
20:00 IST	Mohamed 24'	Report	David 11'; Shalev Harush (yellow card) 27'; Bayo 90+3'	Stadium: Teddy Stadium; Attendance: 0 Referee: (Israel) Gal Laibuvitz
Note: Played Behind Closed Doors

18 February 2021 14	Ironi Kiryat Shmona	v	Ashdod	Kiryat Shmona
19:00 IST				Stadium: Kiryat Shmona Municipal Stadium; Attendance: 0
Note: Played Behind Closed Doors

7 January 2021 15	Ashdod	2 – 1	Hapoel Tel Aviv	Ashdod
20:00 IST	Bayo 13'; Gordana 44'; Yehezkel (yellow card) 68'	Report	Itzhak 4'	Stadium: Yud-Alef Stadium; Attendance: 0 Referee: (Israel) Idan Layba
Note: Played Behind Closed Doors

23 January 2021 16	Maccabi Petah Tikva	2 – 1	Ashdod	Petah Tikva
17:30 IST	Cooper (yellow card) 19' (goal) 23' (pen.); Inbrum (yellow card) 33'; Cohen (yellow card) 50'; Daniel Plesher (yellow card) 51'; Arad Bar (yellow card) 69'; Liel Abada 90+1'	Report	Bagayoko (yellow card) 12'; Yehezkel 16'; Hamoudi Kna'an (yellow card) 61'	Stadium: HaMoshava Stadium; Attendance: 0 Referee: (Israel) Igal Frid
Note: Played Behind Closed Doors

27 January 2021 17	Ashdod	4 – 0	Bnei Yehuda	Ashdod
19:00 IST	David 25'; Awany (yellow card) 50'; Bayo 57'; Hamoudi Kna'an 60'; Oz Bilu 82'	Report	Moussa (yellow card) 10'; Mori (yellow card) 72'; Ghadir (red card) 86'	Stadium: Yud-Alef Stadium; Attendance: 0 Referee: (Israel) David Fuxman
Note: Played Behind Closed Doors

30 January 2021 18	Maccabi Netanya	3 – 0	Ashdod	Netanya
18:45 IST	Yerushalmi (yellow card) 14'; Frater (yellow card) 17'; Kanichowsky 34' 83'; Karam Jaber 41'	Report	Fares Abu Akel (yellow card) 63'; Azulay (yellow card) 71'	Stadium: Netanya Stadium; Attendance: 0 Referee: (Israel) Daniel Bar Natan
Note: Played Behind Closed Doors

6 February 2021 19	Ashdod	v	Maccabi Haifa	Ashdod
20:45 IST				Stadium: Yud-Alef Stadium; Attendance: 0
Note: Played Behind Closed Doors

9 February 2021 20	Hapoel Be'er Sheva	v	Ashdod	Be'er Sheva
20:15 IST				Stadium: Turner Stadium; Attendance: 0
Note: Played Behind Closed Doors

13 February 2021 21	Ashdod	v	Bnei Sakhnin	Ashdod
18:45 IST				Stadium: Yud-Alef Stadium; Attendance: 0
Note: Played Behind Closed Doors

==== League table ====
Pos	Team	Pld	W	D	L	GF	GA	GD	Pts	Qualification or relegation
1	Maccabi Haifa	26	19	2	5	52	20	+32	59	Qualification for the Championship round
2	Maccabi Tel Aviv	26	17	7	2	48	21	+27	58	Qualification for the Championship round
3	F.C. Ashdod	26	13	4	9	37	25	+12	43	Qualification for the Championship round
4	Ironi Kiryat Shmona	26	11	5	10	26	28	−2	38	Qualification for the Championship round
5	Hapoel Be'er Sheva	26	9	10	7	31	29	+2	37	Qualification for the Championship round

Source: Soccerway
Rules for classification: 1) Points; 2) Goal difference; 3) Matches won; 4) Goals scored; 5) Head-to-head points; 6) Head-to-head goal difference; 7) Head-to-head goals scored; 8) Play-off.

=== State Cup ===
22 February 2021 Round of 32	Ashdod	3 – 1	Hapoel Ra'anana	Ashdod
20:00	Kamaheni (yellow card) 19'; David (yellow card) 33'; Kna'an (yellow card) 42'; Gordana 45+1' (pen.) (yellow card) 74'; Stav Turiel (yellow card) 66' (goal) 89'; Bagayoko 75'	Report	Peter Olawale (yellow card) 36'; Roy Amos (yellow card) 45'; Gamon (yellow card) 60'; David Dean Twizer 81'	Stadium: Yud-Alef Stadium; Attendance: 0 Referee: (Israel) Ohad Asulin
Note: COVID-19 pandemic in Israel

17 March 2021 Round of 16	Beitar Jerusalem	1 – 2 (a.e.t.)	Ashdod	Jerusalem
18:00	Shua 41'; Vered (yellow card) 54'; Kriaf (yellow card) 75'; Janković (yellow card) 119'	Report	Gordana 22' (pen.); Azulay (yellow card) 25'; Ocampos 93' (o.g.); Gerafi (yellow card) 100'	Stadium: Teddy Stadium; Attendance: 0 Referee: (Israel) Liran Liany
Note: COVID-19 pandemic in Israel

21 April 2021 Quarter Finals	Ashdod	0 – 1	Maccabi Tel Aviv	Ashdod
20:30	Ben Zaken (yellow card) 52'; Firas Abu Akel (yellow card) 62'; Ben Harush (yellow card) 90+6'	Report	Glazer (yellow card) 34'; Peretz 54'; Luis Hernández (yellow card) 56'; Saborit (yellow card) 68'	Stadium: Yud-Alef Stadium; Attendance: 0 Referee: (Israel) Idan Layba
Note: COVID-19 pandemic in Israel

=== Toto Cup Al ===
==== Group C ====
Pos	Team	Pld	W	D	L	GF	GA	GD	Pts	Qualification or relegation	BEI	BYT	HTA	ASH
1	Beitar Jerusalem	3	1	2	0	2	0	+2	5	Possible Final based on other 1st places	—		0–0	
2	Bnei Yehuda	3	1	1	1	4	5	−1	4	Possible 5–6th match based on other 2nd places	0–0	—		1–5
3	Hapoel Tel Aviv	3	1	1	1	1	3	−2	4	Possible 9–10th match based on other 3rd places		0–3	—	
4	F.C. Ashdod	3	1	0	2	5	4	+1	3	Possible 11–12th match based on other 4th places	2–0		0–1	—

Updated to match(es) played on unknown. Source: Israel Football Association
Rules for classification: 1) points; 2) goal difference; 3) goals for;

8 August 2020 Match 1	Ashdod	0 - 1	Hapoel Tel Aviv	Ashdod
19:00	Gil Cohen (red card) 22'; Gordana (yellow card) 54'	Report	Aitman 24' (pen.); Abu Abaid (yellow card) 79'	Stadium: Yud-Alef Stadium; Attendance: 0 Referee: (Israel) Odeh Na'al

11 August 2020 Match 2	Bnei Yehuda	1 - 5	Ashdod	Tel Aviv
19:30	Roi Ben Shimon 4'; Ljujić (yellow card) 37'; Elian Ruhana (yellow card) 75'	Report	Fares Abu Akel (yellow card) 18'; Yehezkel 54' 72' 77' 90'; Azulay 85'	Stadium: Bloomfield Stadium; Attendance: 0 Referee: (Israel) Snir Levi

16 August 2020 Match 3	Ashdod	0 - 2	Beitar Jerusalem	Ashdod
19:30	Idan Dahan (yellow card) 77'	Report	Vered (yellow card) 3' (goal) 16'; Mohamed (yellow card) 38'; Diogo Verdasca (yellow card) 43'; Tamir Adi (yellow card) 72'; Rotman 75'; Edri (yellow card) 85'	Stadium: Yud-Alef Stadium; Attendance: 0 Referee: (Israel) Sagi Berman

23 August 2020 Placement Match	Ironi Kiryat Shmona	2 - 0	Ashdod	Kiryat Shmona
19:45	Lúcio Maranhão 6' (yellow card) 87'; Guy Ben Lulu 61'	Report	Yehezkel (yellow card) 22'; Gordana (yellow card) 25'; Fares Abu Akel (yellow card) 59'	Stadium: Kiryat Shmona Municipal Stadium; Attendance: 0 Referee: (Israel) Igal Frid
