= 2016–17 Beitar Jerusalem F.C. season =

Beitar Jerusalem F.C.
2016–17 season
- Chairman: Eli Tabib
- Manager: Ran Ben Shimon (until 5 February 2017); Sharon Mimer (from 7 February 2017)
- Stadium: Teddy Stadium
- Ligat Ha'Al: 3rd
- State Cup: Semi Final
- Europa League: Play-off round
- Toto Cup: Group Stage
- Top goalscorer: League: Itay Shechter (14 goals); All: Itay Shechter (19 goals)
- Highest home attendance: 25,049 Vs Saint-Étienne (17 August 2016)
- Lowest home attendance: 3,000 Vs Ashdod (28 January 2017)
- Average home league attendance: 8,102
Home colours	Away colours

The 2016–17 season is Beitar Jerusalem 80th season since its establishment in 1936, and 69th since the establishment of the State of Israel. During the 2016–17 campaign the club have competed in the Israeli Premier League, State Cup, Toto Cup, UEFA Europa League.

== Current squad ==
No.	Pos.	Nation	Player
1	GK	ISR	Boris Klaiman
2	DF	FRA	Antoine Conte
3	MF	ISR	David Keltjens
4	DF	ESP	Jesús Rueda
5	DF	ISR	Dan Mori
7	MF	ISR	Israel Zaguri
8	MF	ISR	Idan Vered
9	FW	ISR	Itay Shechter
10	MF	ISR	Danny Preda
11	MF	ISR	Dan Einbinder (Captain)
12	FW	ISR	Avishay Cohen
14	MF	BRA	Claudemir

No.	Pos.	Nation	Player
16	DF	ISR	Hen Dilmoni
18	MF	ISR	Hen Ezra
21	MF	ISR	Kobi Moyal
22	GK	ISR	Stav Shushan
23	DF	GER	Marcel Heister
26	FW	ISR	Shlomi Avisidris
27	DF	ISR	Oz Raly
33	GK	ISR	Tamir Lalo
52	MF	SVK	Erik Sabo
77	MF	ISR	Ya'akov Berihon
—	MF	ISR	Amir Agayev
—	MF	BRA	Georginho

== Transfers ==
=== Summer ===
In:

No.	Pos.	Nation	Player
—	DF	ISR	Dan Mori (from (Israel) Bnei Yehuda)
—	DF	ISR	Orel Horev (loan return from (Israel) Hapoel Jerusalem)
—	DF	ISR	Naor Sabag (loan return from (Israel) Hapoel Katamon Jerusalem)
—	DF	ISR	Oz Raly (from (Israel) Bnei Yehuda, previously loaned to (Israel) Hapoel Ironi Kiryat Shmona)
—	DF	ISR	Tal Benesh (on loan from (Israel) Hapoel Kfar Saba)
—	DF	GER	Marcel Heister (from (Croatia) NK Istra 1961)
—	MF	ISR	Ya'akov Berihon (from (Israel) Hapoel Rishon LeZion)
—	MF	ISR	Kobi Moyal (from (Israel) Maccabi Haifa)
—	MF	ISR	Idan Vered (from (Canada) Ottawa Fury)
—	MF	ISR	Danny Preda (loan return from (Israel) Hapoel Bnei Lod)
—	MF	SVK	Erik Sabo (on loan from (Greece) PAOK)
—	FW	ISR	Shlomi Avisidris (from (Israel) Hapoel Rishon LeZion)
—	FW	ISR	Shimon Abuhatzira (from (Israel) Maccabi Haifa)

Out:

No.	Pos.	Nation	Player
—	DF	ISR	Nisso Kapiloto (to (Israel) Hapoel Haifa)
—	DF	SRB	Dušan Matović (to (Israel) Hapoel Kfar Saba)
—	DF	ISR	Joakim Askling (to (Sweden) Assyriska FF)
—	DF	ISR	Elad Gabai (to (Israel) Hapoel Ra'anana)
—	MF	ISR	Liroy Zhairi (to (Israel) Maccabi Petah Tikva)
—	FW	AUS	Nikita Rukavytsya (to (Israel) Maccabi Haifa)
—	FW	ISR	Dovev Gabay (to (Israel) Bnei Yehuda)

== Pre-season and friendlies ==
18 June 2016 Training Camp	Beitar Jerusalem (Israel)	1–0	(Hungary) MTK Budapest FC
17:00	Valpoort

21 June 2016 Training Camp	Beitar Jerusalem (Israel)	1–1	(Hungary) Diósgyőri VTK
	Avisidris 89'

== Competitions ==
=== Ligat Ha'Al ===
==== Results ====
21 August 2016 1	Maccabi Petah Tikva	2–2	Beitar Jerusalem	Petah Tikva
20:00 IDT	Kalibat 19'; Kanyuk 38'	Summary; Report (Hebrew)	L. Cohen 9'; Vered 29'	Stadium: HaMoshava Stadium; Attendance: 7,000; Referee: Liran Liany

28 August 2016 2	Beitar Jerusalem	2–2	Ironi Kiryat Shmona	Jerusalem
20:15 IDT	Abuhatzira 90+1'; L. Cohen 90+2'	Summary; Report (Hebrew)	Benesh 44' (o.g.); Brossou 90+4'	Stadium: Teddy Stadium; Attendance: 6,000; Referee: Roei Reinschreiber

11 September 2016 3	Maccabi Tel Aviv	2–2	Beitar Jerusalem	Netanya
20:45 IDT	Igiebor 59'; Ben Haim II 72' (pen.)	Summary	Vered 43'; Abuhatzira 90+5'	Stadium: Netanya Stadium; Attendance: 12,650; Referee: Menashe Mashiah

17 September 2016 4	Beitar Jerusalem	3–0	Hapoel Ashkelon	Jerusalem
20:10 IDT	Vered 15'; Rueda 28'; Abuhatzira 45'	Summary		Stadium: Teddy Stadium; Attendance: 6,000; Referee: Ziv Adler

24 September 2016 5	Hapoel Haifa	4–0	Beitar Jerusalem	Haifa
20:10 IDT	Bahia 4', 15'; Jazvić 89'; Arbeitman 90'	Summary		Stadium: Sammy Ofer Stadium; Attendance: 6,000; Referee: Oren Siminyan

1 October 2016 6	Beitar Jerusalem	1–0	Hapoel Kfar Saba	Jerusalem
20:10 IDT	Rueda 60'	Summary		Stadium: Teddy Stadium; Attendance: 6,000; Referee: Idan Layba

22 October 2016 7	Ashdod	0–0	Beitar Jerusalem	Ashdod
20:30 IDT		Summary		Stadium: Yud-Alef Stadium; Attendance: 4,500; Referee: Gal Laibuvitz

31 October 2016 8	Beitar Jerusalem	2–2	Bnei Yehuda	Jerusalem
20:30 IST	Shechter 5'; Vered 78'	Summary	A. Buzaglo 47'; Jovanović 52'	Stadium: Teddy Stadium; Attendance: 7,000; Referee: Guy Berger

5 November 2016 9	Beitar Jerusalem	1–0	Hapoel Ra'anana	Jerusalem
20:00 IST	Rueda 69'	Summary		Stadium: Teddy Stadium; Attendance: 5,500; Referee: Shlomi Ben Avraham

21 November 2016 10	Beitar Jerusalem	1–1	Hapoel Tel Aviv	Jerusalem
21:00 IST	Shechter 40'	Summary	Altman 15' (pen.)	Stadium: Teddy Stadium; Attendance: 19,700; Referee: Liran Liany

28 November 2016 11	Beitar Jerusalem	0–1	Bnei Sakhnin	Jerusalem
21:00 IST		Summary	Safouri 87'	Stadium: Teddy Stadium; Attendance: 8,000; Referee: Menashe Mashiah

5 December 2016 12	Maccabi Haifa	0–2	Beitar Jerusalem	Haifa
21:00 IST		Summary	L. Cohen 39', 68'	Stadium: Sammy Ofer Stadium; Attendance: 29,200; Referee: Erez Papir

12 December 2016 13	Beitar Jerusalem	1–3	Hapoel Be'er Sheva	Petah Tikva
21:00 IST	Claudemir 27'	Summary	10,000: Nwakaeme 34'; M. Buzaglo 76' (pen.), 90+4'	Stadium: HaMoshava Stadium; Referee: Alon Yefet

17 December 2016 14	Beitar Jerusalem	1–1	Maccabi Petah Tikva	Jerusalem
20:30 IST	Rueda 85'	Summary	Roman 18'	Stadium: Teddy Stadium; Attendance: 5,000; Referee: Eli Hacmon

24 December 2016 15	Ironi Kiryat Shmona	2–0	Beitar Jerusalem	Kiryat Shmona
20:30 IST	Abed 25'; Mauricio 49'	Summary		Stadium: Kiryat Shmona Municipal Stadium; Attendance: 2,500; Referee: Shlomi Ben Avraham

2 January 2017 16	Beitar Jerusalem	1–0	Maccabi Tel Aviv	Jerusalem
21:00 IST	Shechter 38' (pen.)	Summary		Stadium: Teddy Stadium; Attendance: 7,500; Referee: Liran Liany

10 January 2017 17	Hapoel Ashkelon	1–1	Beitar Jerusalem	Ashkelon
19:45 IST	Swisa 32'	Summary	Shechter 83' (pen.)	Stadium: Sala Stadium; Attendance: 5,100; Referee: Igal Frid

15 January 2017 18	Beitar Jerusalem	1–0	Hapoel Haifa	Jerusalem
20:15 IST	Einbinder 7'	Summary		Stadium: Teddy Stadium; Attendance: 3,500; Referee: Daniel Bar-Natan

22 January 2017 19	Hapoel Kfar Saba	0–2	Beitar Jerusalem	Kfar Saba
20:00 IST		Summary	Vered 74'; Zaguri 85'	Stadium: Levita Stadium; Attendance: 2,200; Referee: Eitan Shmuelevich

28 January 2017 20	Beitar Jerusalem	1–1	Ashdod	Jerusalem
20:30 IST	Shechter 71' (pen.)	Summary	David 52'	Stadium: Teddy Stadium; Attendance: 3,000; Referee: Guy Berger

4 February 2017 21	Bnei Yehuda	1–1	Beitar Jerusalem	Petah Tikva
18:30 IST	Valskis 74'	Summary	Shechter 36'	Stadium: HaMoshava Stadium; Attendance: 5,600; Referee: Shalom Ben-Avraham

11 February 2017 22	Hapoel Ra'anana	0–4	Beitar Jerusalem	Netanya
		Summary	Keltjens 19'; Einbinder 35'; Ezra 70'; Vered 78'	Stadium: Netanya Stadium; Attendance: 4,000; Referee: Oren Siminyan

18 February 2017 23	Hapoel Tel Aviv	1–2	Beitar Jerusalem	Petah Tikva
	Reichert 3'	Summary	Rueda 43'; Shechter 62'	Stadium: HaMoshava Stadium; Attendance: 10,000; Referee: Erez Papir

25 February 2017 24	Bnei Sakhnin	0–2	Beitar Jerusalem	Sakhnin
		Summary	Shechter 30'; Vered 45'	Stadium: Doha Stadium; Attendance: 8,000; Referee: Alon Yeffet

4 March 2017 25	Beitar Jerusalem	0–1	Maccabi Haifa	Jerusalem
		Summary	Vermouth 36'	Stadium: Teddy Stadium; Attendance: 15,000; Referee: Eli Hakmon

11 March 2017 26	Hapoel Be'er Sheva	2–1	Beitar Jerusalem	Be'er Sheva
	Zrihan 49' , 59'	Summary	Shechter 63'	Stadium: Turner Stadium; Attendance: 15,000; Referee: Roey Reinsheriber

==== League table ====
Pos	Team	Pld	W	D	L	GF	GA	GD	Pts	Qualification or relegation
2	Maccabi Tel Aviv	26	17	5	4	45	19	+26	56	Qualification for the Championship round
3	Maccabi Petah Tikva	26	13	9	4	36	23	+13	48	Qualification for the Championship round
4	Beitar Jerusalem	26	10	10	6	34	27	+7	40	Qualification for the Championship round
5	Bnei Sakhnin	26	10	9	7	26	26	0	39	Qualification for the Championship round
6	Maccabi Haifa	26	10	8	8	30	25	+5	38	Qualification for the Championship round

Source: Israel Football Association, Soccerway
Rules for classification: 1) Points; 2) Goal difference; 3) Matches won; 4) Goals scored; 5) Head-to-head points; 6) Head-to-head goal difference; 7) Head-to-head goals scored; 8) Play-off.

==== Top playoff ====
18 March 2017 27	Maccabi Petah Tikva	0-1	Beitar Jerusalem	Petah Tikva
19:30 IST			Einbinder 56'	Stadium: HaMoshava Stadium; Attendance: 4,200; Referee: Idan Layba

1 April 2017 28	Maccabi Haifa	3–2	Beitar Jerusalem	Haifa
18:30 IST	Awad 31'; Rukavytsya 42', 51'		Ezra 22'; Shechter 40' (pen.)	Stadium: Sammy Ofer Stadium; Attendance: 20,000; Referee: Daniel Bar Natan

8 April 2017 29	Beitar Jerusalem	3–0	Bnei Sakhnin	Jerusalem
20:55 IST	Shechter 53' (pen.); Sabo 67'; Vered 82'			Stadium: Teddy Stadium; Attendance: 5,000; Referee: Eitan Shmuelevich

17 April 2017 30	Hapoel Be'er Sheva	2-0	Beitar Jerusalem	Be'er Sheva
20:55 IST	Radi 67'; Barda 76'			Stadium: Turner Stadium; Attendance: 14,750; Referee: Erez Papir

22 April 2017 31	Beitar Jerusalem	1–1	Maccabi Tel Aviv	Jerusalem
20:55 IST	Ben Haim 14'		Vered 45'	Stadium: Teddy Stadium; Attendance: 7,000; Referee: Eli Hackmon

26 April 2017 32	Beitar Jerusalem	2-1	Maccabi Petah Tikva	Jerusalem
19:30 IST	Rueda 5'; Vered 90+4'		Melamed 10'	Stadium: Teddy Stadium; Attendance: 6,500; Referee: Liran Liani

29 April 2017 33	Beitar Jerusalem	2-0	Maccabi Haifa	Jerusalem
19:10 IST	Vered 12'; Einbinder 48'			Stadium: Teddy Stadium; Attendance: 6,500; Referee: Roi Reinshreiber

6 May 2017 34	Bnei Sakhnin	1-5	Beitar Jerusalem	Acre
19:30 IST	Shemesh 41'		Shechter 15'; Sabo 45+1' (pen.); Shechter 57'; Keltjens 60'; Berihon 88'	Stadium: Acre Municipal Stadium; Attendance: *Redius game without fans Referee: Ziv Adler

15 May 2017 35	Beitar Jerusalem	1-1	Hapoel Be'er Sheva	Jerusalem
20:55 IST	Berihon 51'		Sahar 29'	Stadium: Teddy Stadium; Attendance: 5,700; Referee: Shalom Ben Avraham

20 May 2017 36	Maccabi Tel Aviv	0-2	Beitar Jerusalem	Netanya
20:30 IST			Sabo 12'; Shechter 19'	Stadium: Netanya Stadium; Attendance: 7,170; Referee: Guy Berger

==== Top playoff table ====
Pos	Team	Pld	W	D	L	GF	GA	GD	Pts	Qualification
1	Hapoel Be'er Sheva (C, Q)	36	26	7	3	73	18	+55	85	Qualification for the Champions League second qualifying round
2	Maccabi Tel Aviv (Q)	36	22	6	8	61	28	+33	72	Qualification for the Europa League first qualifying round
3	Beitar Jerusalem (Q)	36	16	12	8	53	36	+17	60	Qualification for the Europa League first qualifying round
4	Maccabi Petah Tikva	36	15	11	10	42	34	+8	56	
5	Bnei Sakhnin	36	13	9	14	32	46	−14	48	
6	Maccabi Haifa	36	12	9	15	34	41	−7	45	

Source: Israel Football Association, Soccerway
Rules for classification: 1) Points; 2) Goal difference; 3) Matches won; 4) Goals scored; 5) Head-to-head points; 6) Head-to-head goal difference; 7) Head-to-head goals scored; 8) Play-off.
(C) Champions; (Q) Qualified for the phase indicated

=== UEFA Europe League ===
==== First qualifying round ====
30 June 2016 First leg	FK Sloboda Tuzla (Bosnia and Herzegovina)	0–0	(Israel) Beitar Jerusalem	Zenica, Bosnia and Herzegovina
18:00 CEST		Report		Stadium: Bilino Polje Stadium; Attendance: 2,762; Referee: Glenn Nyberg (Sweden)

7 July 2016 Second leg	Beitar Jerusalem (Israel)	1–0 (1–0 agg.)	(Bosnia and Herzegovina) FK Sloboda Tuzla	Jerusalem, Israel
19:45 IDT	Atzili 66' (pen.)	Report		Stadium: Teddy Stadium; Attendance: 9,010; Referee: Oleksandr Derdo (Ukraine)

==== Second qualifying round ====
14 July 2016 First leg	Beitar Jerusalem (Israel)	1–0	(Cyprus) AC Omonia	Jerusalem, Israel
20:00 IDT	Abuhatzira 71'	Report		Stadium: Teddy Stadium; Attendance: 9,200; Referee: Marcin Borski (Poland)

21 July 2016 First leg	AC Omonia (Cyprus)	3–2 (3–3 agg.)	(Israel) Beitar Jerusalem	Nicosia, Cyprus
19:30 EEST	Agayev 26'; Sheridan 45+3' (pen.); Roushias 81'	Report	Atzili 17', 45'	Stadium: GSP Stadium; Attendance: 14,383; Referee: Davide Massa (Italy)

==== Third qualifying round ====
28 July 2016 First leg	Jelgava (Latvia)	1–1	(Israel) Beitar Jerusalem	Riga, Latvia
20:00 EEST	Smirnovs 70'	Report	Vered 25'	Stadium: Skonto Stadium; Attendance: 2,886; Referee: Georgi Kabakov (Bulgaria)

4 August 2016 Second leg	Beitar Jerusalem (Israel)	3–0	(Latvia) Jelgava	Jerusalem, Israel
20:00 IDT	Atzili 16' (pen.); Shechter 29'; Heister 47'	Report		Stadium: Teddy Stadium; Attendance: 16,175; Referee: Hugo Miguel (Portugal)

==== Play-off round ====
17 August 2016 First leg	Beitar Jerusalem (Israel)	1–2	(France) AS Saint-Étienne	Jerusalem, Israel
19:00 IDT	Vered 8'	Report	Lemoine 15'; Rueda 30' (o.g.)	Stadium: Teddy Stadium; Attendance: 25,049; Referee: Michael Oliver (England)

25 August 2016 Second leg	AS Saint-Étienne (France)	0–0	Beitar Jerusalem (Israel)	Saint-Étienne, France
20:45 CEST		Report		Stadium: Stade Geoffroy-Guichard; Attendance: 20,354; Referee: Matej Jug (Slovenia)

=== State Cup ===
7 January 2017 Eighth round	Beitar Jerusalem	3–0	Hapoel Kfar Saba	Jerusalem
20:30 IST	Shechter 5'; Sabo 79' (pen.); L. Cohen 90+1'	Summary		Stadium: Teddy Stadium; Referee: Gal Laibuvitz

25 January 2017 Round of 16	Beitar Jerusalem	2–1	Bnei Sakhnin	Jerusalem
20:55 IST	Einbinder 42'; Shechter 72'	Summary	Shemesh 79'	Stadium: Teddy Stadium; Attendance: 15,450; Referee: Menashe Mashiah

7 February 2017 Quarter-final, 1st leg	Beitar Jerusalem	2–0	Ironi Kiryat Shmona	Jerusalem
21:00 IST	Shechter 21' (pen.) , 56'	Summary		Stadium: Teddy Stadium; Referee: Eli Hakmon

28 February 2017 Quarter-final, 2nd leg	Ironi Kiryat Shmona	0–1	Beitar Jerusalem	Kiryat Shmona
		Summary	Maurocio 22'	Stadium: Kiryat Shmona Municipal Stadium; Referee: Ziv Adler

5 April 2017 Semi-Final	Beitar Jerusalem	1–2	Maccabi Tel Aviv	Haifa
	Ezra 89'	Summary	Schoenfeld 19'; Micha 60'	Stadium: Sammy Ofer Stadium; Attendance: 30,000; Referee: Ziv Adler

=== Toto Cup ===
==== Group C ====
Pos	Team	Pld	W	D	L	GF	GA	GD	Pts	Qualification or relegation	ASH	HBS	HAS	BEI
1	F.C. Ashdod	3	2	1	0	6	3	+3	7	Qualified to Quarter-finals	—		2–2	3–1
2	Hapoel Be'er Sheva	3	2	0	1	9	3	+6	6	Qualified to Quarter-finals	0–1	—		
3	Hapoel Ashkelon	3	0	2	1	3	8	−5	2			0–5	—	1–1
4	Beitar Jerusalem	3	0	1	2	4	8	−4	1			2–4		—

Updated to match(es) played on 10 August 2016. Source: Israel Football Association
Rules for classification: 1) points; 2) goal difference; 3) number of wins; 4) goals scored; 5) head to head; 6)deciding match.
