= Claudemir =

Claudemir is the name of:

- Claudemir (footballer, born 1969), Brazilian footballer
- Claudemir (footballer, born 1988), Brazilian footballer
- Claudemir (footballer, born 1984), Brazilian footballer
- Cacau, real name Claudemir Jeronimo Barretto (born 1981), German-Brazilian footballer
