= Claudecir =

Claudecir is a given name. Notable people with the name include:

- Claudecir (footballer, born 1975), full name Claudecir Aparecido de Aguiar, Brazilian football midfielder
- Claudecir (footballer, born 1989), full name Claudecir dos Reis Rodrigues Júnior, Brazilian football forward

== See also ==
- Claudemir
