= 2010–11 Toto Cup Al =

Tournament details
- Country: Israel
- Teams: 16

Final positions
- Champions: Ironi Kiryat Shmona (1st title)
- Runners-up: Maccabi Petah Tikva F.C.

Tournament statistics
- Matches played: 55
- Goals scored: 166 (3.02 per match)
- Top goal scorer: (Israel) Dovev Gabay (6)

The 2010–11 Toto Cup Al was the twenty-nine season of the third most important football tournament in Israel since its introduction and seventh under the current format. It was held in two stages. First, sixteen Premier League teams were divided into four groups. The winners and runners-up, were advanced to the Quarterfinals. Quarterfinals, Semifinals and Final were held as one-legged matches, with the Final played at the Ramat Gan Stadium.

The defending champions were Beitar Jerusalem, who made it their second Toto Cup title overall.

On 19 January 2011, Ironi Kiryat Shmona won the 2010–11 Toto Cup Al, a year after winning the Leumit version of the cup, it was their first Toto Cup Al title overall.

== Group stage ==
The draw took place on June 14, 2010.

The matches were being played from 31 July to 10 November 2010.

=== Group A ===
Pos	Team	Pld	W	D	L	GF	GA	GD	Pts	MHA	IKS	HHA	HAC
1	Maccabi Haifa (A)	6	3	2	1	12	6	+6	11		1–1	3–0	4–1
2	Ironi Kiryat Shmona (A)	6	1	5	0	8	7	+1	8	1–1		0–0	2–1
3	Hapoel Haifa	6	1	3	2	6	9	−3	6	0–1	1–1		1–0
4	Hapoel Acre	6	1	2	3	9	13	−4	5	3–2	3–3	1–1	

Source: football.org.il (in Hebrew)
Rules for classification: 1st points; 2nd goal difference; 3rd matches won; 4th goals scored; 5th head-to-head; 6th decision match
(A) Advanced to the quarterfinals

=== Group B ===
Pos	Team	Pld	W	D	L	GF	GA	GD	Pts	MTA	MNE	BnS	HTA
1	Maccabi Tel Aviv (A)	6	4	1	1	15	5	+10	13		2–0	2–0 (Note: Maccabi Tel Aviv hosted the match against Bnei Sakhnin in a neutral stadium and without a crowd due to Maccabi fans hooliganism.)	2–3
2	Maccabi Netanya (A)	6	3	1	2	6	9	−3	10	1–5		2–1	2–1
3	Bnei Sakhnin	6	2	2	2	6	6	0	8	1–1	0–0		2–1
4	Hapoel Tel Aviv	6	1	0	5	5	12	−7	3	0–3 (Note: Hapoel Tel Aviv received a technical loss of 3–0 to Maccabi Tel Aviv for fielding an ineligible player. The original game finished in a 3–3 draw.)	0–1	0–2 (Note: Hapoel Tel Aviv hosted the match against Bnei Sakhnin in a neutral stadium due to Hapoel fans hooliganism.)	

Source: football.org.il (in Hebrew)
Rules for classification: 1st points; 2nd goal difference; 3rd matches won; 4th goals scored; 5th head-to-head; 6th decision match
(A) Advanced to the quarterfinals

=== Group C ===
Pos	Team	Pld	W	D	L	GF	GA	GD	Pts	BnY	MPT	HRG	HPT
1	Bnei Yehuda (A)	6	5	1	0	15	5	+10	16		4–1	3–1	1–1
2	Maccabi Petah Tikva (A)	6	4	0	2	12	8	+4	12	0–1		3–0	3–2
3	Hapoel Ramat Gan	6	2	0	4	8	15	−7	6	0–3	1–3		2–0
4	Hapoel Petah Tikva	6	1	1	4	8	15	−7	4	2–3	0–2	3–4	

Source: football.org.il (in Hebrew)
Rules for classification: 1st points; 2nd goal difference; 3rd matches won; 4th goals scored; 5th head-to-head; 6th decision match
(A) Advanced to the quarterfinals

=== Group D ===
Pos	Team	Pld	W	D	L	GF	GA	GD	Pts	BEI	ASH	HBS	HAS
1	Beitar Jerusalem (A)	6	2	4	0	16	6	+10	10		8–0	0–0	3–1
2	F.C. Ironi Ashdod (A)	6	3	1	2	8	14	−6	10	2–2		2–1	2–0
3	Hapoel Be'er Sheva	6	2	2	2	7	5	+2	8	1–1	1–2		1–0
4	Hapoel Ashkelon	6	1	1	4	5	11	−6	4	2–2	2–0	0–3 (Note: Hapoel Ashkelon received a technical loss of 3–0 to Hapoel Be'er Sheva for fielding an ineligible player. The original game finished in a 3–0 win for Hapoel Ashkelon.)	

Source: football.org.il (in Hebrew)
Rules for classification: 1st points; 2nd goal difference; 3rd matches won; 4th goals scored; 5th head-to-head; 6th decision match
(A) Advanced to the quarterfinals

== Elimination rounds ==
=== Quarterfinals ===
The matches were played from December 28 to 30, 2010.

Home team	Score^{1}	Away team
Ironi Kiryat Shmona	1 – 0	F.C. Ashdod
Maccabi Petah Tikva	1 – 1	Beitar Jerusalem
2 – 2 after extra time – Maccabi Petah Tikva won 4 – 2 on penalties
Maccabi Netanya	2 – 2	Bnei Yehuda
Bnei Yehuda won 4 – 2 after extra time
Maccabi Tel Aviv	0 – 0^{2}	Maccabi Haifa
Maccabi Tel Aviv won 1 – 0 after extra time

^{1} Score after 90 minutes

^{2} Maccabi Tel Aviv hosted the match against Maccabi Haifa without a crowd of both sides due to Maccabi Tel Aviv fans hooliganism.

=== Semifinals ===
The draw for the Semifinals took place on 30 December 2010, with matches played a week later on January 5, 2011.

Home team	Score^{1}	Away team
Ironi Kiryat Shmona	1 – 1	Bnei Yehuda
1 – 1 after extra time – Ironi Kiryat Shmona won 5 – 4 on penalties
Maccabi Petah Tikva	4 – 1	Maccabi Tel Aviv

^{1} Score after 90 minutes

=== Final ===
January 19, 2011
19:45 IST

Maccabi Petah Tikva	0 – 1	Ironi Kiryat Shmona
	Report	Avisidris 82'

Ramat Gan Stadium, Ramat Gan
Attendance: 3,000
Referee: Shai Shitrit

== See also ==
- 2010–11 Toto Cup Leumit
- 2010–11 Israeli Premier League
- 2010–11 Israel State Cup
