= Ofer Verta =

Israeli footballer

Personal information
- Full name: Ofer Yom-Tov Verta
- Date of birth: 23 May 1990 (age 36)
- Place of birth: Ashdod, Israel
- Height: 1.80 m (5 ft 11 in)
- Position: Right back

Team information
- Current team: Maccabi Herzliya

Senior career*
Years	Team	Apps	(Gls)
2010–2015	F.C. Ashdod	133	(2)
2015–2017	Hapoel Tel Aviv	49	(0)
2017–2018	Beitar Jerusalem	15	(0)
2018–2019	Hapoel Nazareth Illit	19	(0)
2019–2020	Hapoel Ramat Gan	27	(0)
2020–2022	Hapoel Ashdod	53	(3)
2022–2023	Hapoel Ramat Gan	4	(0)
2023–	Maccabi Herzliya	0	(0)

International career
2011–2013	Israel U21	12	(0)
- * Club domestic league appearances and goals as of 1 June 2022

Ofer Yom-Tov Verta (Hebrew: עופר ורטה; born 23 May 1990) is an Israeli footballer who plays for Maccabi Herzliya as a defender.
