= Claudemir (footballer, born 1969) =

Brazilian footballer

Personal information
- Full name: Claudemir Barbosa Ribeiro
- Date of birth: 25 March 1969 (age 57)
- Place of birth: Fortaleza, Brazil
- Position: Forward

Youth career
- Fortaleza

Senior career*
Years	Team	Apps	(Gls)
1984–1986	Fortaleza		
1986–1988	São Paulo		
1987	→ Juventus-SP (loan)		
1988	→ Ceará (loan)		
- * Club domestic league appearances and goals as of 29 November 2023

Claudemir Barbosa Ribeiro (born 25 March 1969), simply known as Claudemir, is a Brazilian former professional footballer who played as a forward.

== Career ==
Claudemir had a meteoric start at Fortaleza EC, becoming state champion in 1984 and later being traded to São Paulo FC. For São Paulo where he was part of the Brazilian champion squad in 1986, but due to problems with alcoholism he ended up on loan in later years. Ended his career early.

In 2004, Claudemir became an evangelical pastor.

== Honours ==
São Paulo

- Campeonato Brasileiro: 1986

Fortaleza

- Campeonato Cearense: 1985
