= Yoav Gerafi =

Israeli footballer

Personal information
- Full name: Yoav Pini Gerafi
- Date of birth: 29 August 1993 (age 33)
- Place of birth: Tel Mond, Israel
- Height: 1.83 m (6 ft 0 in)
- Position: Goalkeeper

Team information
- Current team: Maccabi Tel Aviv
- Number: 1

Senior career*
Years	Team	Apps	(Gls)
2010–2014	Hapoel Kfar Saba	5	(0)
2014–2023	F.C. Ashdod	180	(0)
2014–2015	→ Hapoel Ra'anana (loan)	2	(0)
2019–2020	→ Hapoel Tel Aviv (loan)	22	(0)
2023–2025	Hapoel Haifa	60	(0)
2025–	Maccabi Tel Aviv	1	(0)
2026–	→ Hapoel Haifa F.C (loan)	12	(0)

International career^{‡}
2022–	Israel	4	(0)
- * Club domestic league appearances and goals as of 1 June 2026 ‡ National team caps and goals as of 9 September 2024

Yoav Pini Gerafi (sometimes Jarafi or Jerafi, Hebrew: יואב פיני ג'ראפי; born 29 August 1993) is an Israeli footballer who plays as a goalkeeper for Israeli Premier League club Maccabi Tel Aviv and the Israel national team.

== Early life ==
Gerafi was born in Tel Mond, Israel, to a family of Mizrahi Jewish (Yemenite-Jewish) descent.

== Club career ==
Gerafi made his professional debut for Hapoel Ra'anana in the Israeli Premier League on 14 February 2015, coming on as a substitute in the 14th minute for Shoval Gozlan after starting goalkeeper Daniel Lifshitz was sent off in the 11th minute. The match finished as a 2–1 win for Hapoel Ra'anana.

On 11 June 2023 signed for two seasons in Hapoel Haifa.

== International career ==
In March 2019, Gerafi was first called up to the senior Israel national team ahead of the UEFA Euro 2020 qualifying matches against Slovenia and Austria. He made his debut on 27 September 2022 in a friendly game against Malta.

== See also ==
- List of Jewish footballers
- List of Jews in sports
- List of Israelis
