= Montari Kamaheni =

Ghanaian footballer

Personal information
- Full name: Montari Kamaheni
- Date of birth: 1 February 2000 (age 26)
- Place of birth: Tamale, Ghana
- Height: 1.74 m (5 ft 8 1/2 in)
- Position: Left-back

Team information
- Current team: Hapoel Kfar Shalem
- Number: 13

Youth career
- Dreams

Senior career*
Years	Team	Apps	(Gls)
2018–2019	Dreams	8	(0)
2019–2021	→ Ashdod (loan)	49	(2)
2021–2024	Ashdod	41	(0)
2025–	Hapoel Kfar Shalem	16	(0)

International career
2019	Ghana U20	3	(0)
- * Club domestic league appearances and goals as of 15 June 2025

Montari Kamaheni (born 1 February 2000) is a Ghanaian footballer who plays as a left-back for Hapoel Kfar Shalem.

== Club career ==
On 12 June 2020, Kamaheni signed for the Israeli Premier League club in Ashdod. After two years on loan, Kamaheni joined Ashdod on a permanent deal in June 2021.

== International career ==
In March 2022 he received his first call-up to the Ghana senior national team for the 2022 FIFA World Cup play-off qualification match against Nigeria.

== Honours ==
Individual

- IFFHS CAF Youth Team of the Year: 2020
