= Jesús Rueda (footballer) =

Spanish footballer

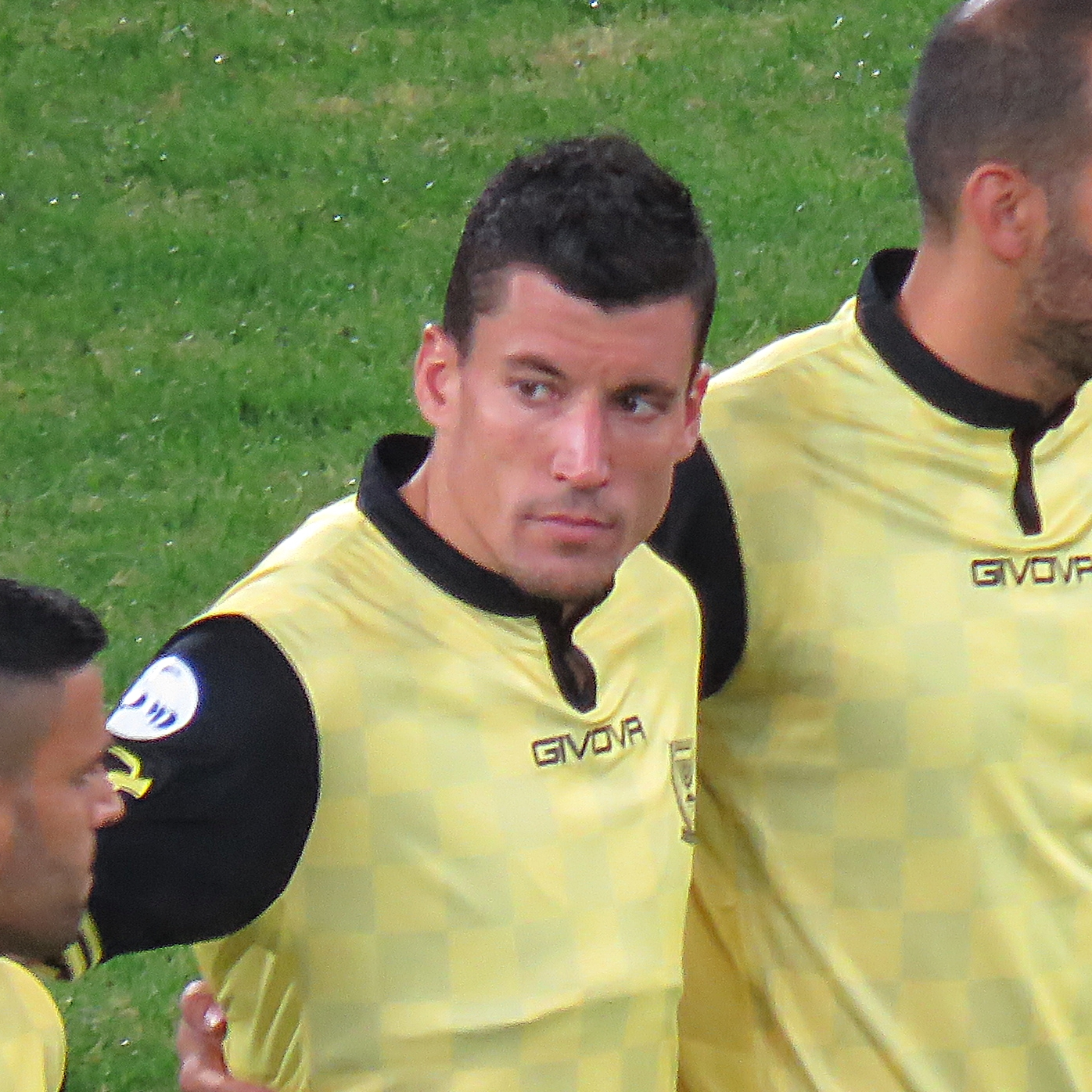
- Rueda lining up for Beitar Jerusalem in 2016

Personal information
- Full name: Jesús Rueda Ambrosio
- Date of birth: 19 February 1987 (age 39)
- Place of birth: Corte de Peleas, Spain
- Height: 1.81 m (5 ft 11 in)
- Positions: Centre-back; defensive midfielder

Youth career
- 2002–2005: Valladolid

Senior career*
Years	Team	Apps	(Gls)
2005–2009	Valladolid B	114	(11)
2008–2015	Valladolid	148	(3)
2009–2010	→ Córdoba (loan)	30	(2)
2015–2017	Beitar Jerusalem	62	(7)
2017–2019	APOEL	12	(0)
2019–2020	Extremadura	4	(0)
2020–2021	Gimnàstic	19	(1)
2021–2022	Logroñés	33	(0)
2022–2023	Zamora	10	(0)
2023–2025	San Roque	63	(3)
- * Club domestic league appearances and goals as of 00:37, 19 September 2025 (UTC)

Jesús Rueda Ambrosio (born 19 February 1987) is a Spanish professional footballer who plays as a central defender or defensive midfielder.

He spent most of his career with Valladolid, playing 163 competitive matches mostly in the Segunda División.

== Club career ==
=== Valladolid ===
Born in Corte de Peleas, Province of Badajoz, Extremadura, Rueda played youth football with Real Valladolid. He made his senior debut with the reserve team, spending four full seasons with the side in the Segunda División B; on 12 November 2008 he made his first official appearance with the main squad, featuring 34 minutes in a 2–2 draw against Hércules CF in the round of 32 of the Copa del Rey, and his first La Liga match was on the following 26 April, also at the Estadio Nuevo José Zorrilla, a 0–0 draw with CA Osasuna in which he came on as a late substitute.

After spending the 2009–10 campaign on loan to Córdoba CF of Segunda División, Rueda returned to Valladolid which were now in the same level. He totalled 3,867 minutes of action in the second year in his second spell – playoffs included – scoring in the 1–1 draw at Recreativo de Huelva on 15 October 2011 as the Castile and León side went on to return to the top flight.

=== Later career ===
On 13 August 2015, after appearing regularly as the club fluctuated between the first and second tiers, Rueda terminated his contract with the Blanquivioletas. He subsequently moved abroad for the first time, receiving offers from teams in Bulgaria and Israel, eventually signing for Beitar Jerusalem F.C. and becoming a regular in the Holy Land team alongside compatriot Pablo de Lucas; manager Slobodan Drapić stated "I wish I had eleven like Rueda", and he was among a growing contingent of Spaniards playing in the relatively obscure Israeli Premier League, gaining media attention back home.

Rueda moved countries again in June 2017, when he signed a two-year deal for APOEL FC of the Cypriot First Division, a club whose director Juanjo Lorenzo was from Valladolid. His debut season in Nicosia ended at the halfway point when he suffered a knee injury in training, ruling him out for six months.

On 21 July 2019, free agent Rueda returned to Spain and joined second division team Extremadura UD. The following 25 January, after only five official games, he cut ties with the club and signed a 18-month contract with third-tier Gimnàstic de Tarragona four days later.

On 5 August 2021, Rueda signed a one-year deal with UD Logroñés, recently relegated to the Primera División RFEF.

== Career statistics ==
As of match played on 9 May 2021

Club	Season	League			Cup		Other		Total	
Club	Season	Division	Apps	Goals	Apps	Goals	Apps	Goals	Apps	Goals
Valladolid B	2005–06	Segunda División B	21	0	—		—		10	2
Valladolid B	2006–07	Segunda División B	36	5	—		2 (Note: Appearances in Segunda División B relegation play-offs)	0	38	5
Valladolid B	2007–08	Segunda División B	30	4	—		—		30	4
Valladolid B	2008–09	Segunda División B	18	2	—		—		18	2
Valladolid B	Total		114	11	—		2	0	116	11
Valladolid	2006–07	Segunda División	0	0	0	0	—		0	0
Valladolid	2008–09	La Liga	3	0	2	0	—		5	0
Valladolid	2010–11	Segunda División	11	0	2	0	1 (Note: Appearances in La Liga play-offs)	0	14	0
Valladolid	2011–12	Segunda División	39	1	1	0	4	0	44	1
Valladolid	2012–13	La Liga	28	0	2	0	—		30	0
Valladolid	2013–14	La Liga	35	1	1	0	—		36	1
Valladolid	2014–15	Segunda División	32	1	0	0	2	0	34	1
Valladolid	Total		148	3	8	0	7	0	163	3
Córdoba (loan)	2009–10	Segunda División	30	2	2	0	—		32	2
Beitar Jerusalem	2015–16	Israeli Premier League	29	1	4	0	—		33	1
Beitar Jerusalem	2016–17	Israeli Premier League	33	6	7	0	7 (Note: Appearances in UEFA Europa League)	0	47	6
Beitar Jerusalem	Total		62	7	11	0	7	0	80	7
APOEL	2017–18	Cypriot First Division	11	0	1	0	11 (Note: Appearances in UEFA Champions League)	0	23	0
APOEL	2018–19	Cypriot First Division	1	0	2	0	0	0	3	0
APOEL	Total		12	0	3	0	11	0	26	0
Extremadura	2019–20	Segunda División	4	0	1	0	—		5	0
Gimnàstic	2019–20	Segunda División B	6	1	0	0	0	0	6	1
Gimnàstic	2020–21	Segunda División B	13	0	0	0	0	0	13	0
Gimnàstic	Total		19	1	0	0	0	0	19	1
Career total			389	24	25	0	27	0	441	24
