= Corte de Peleas =

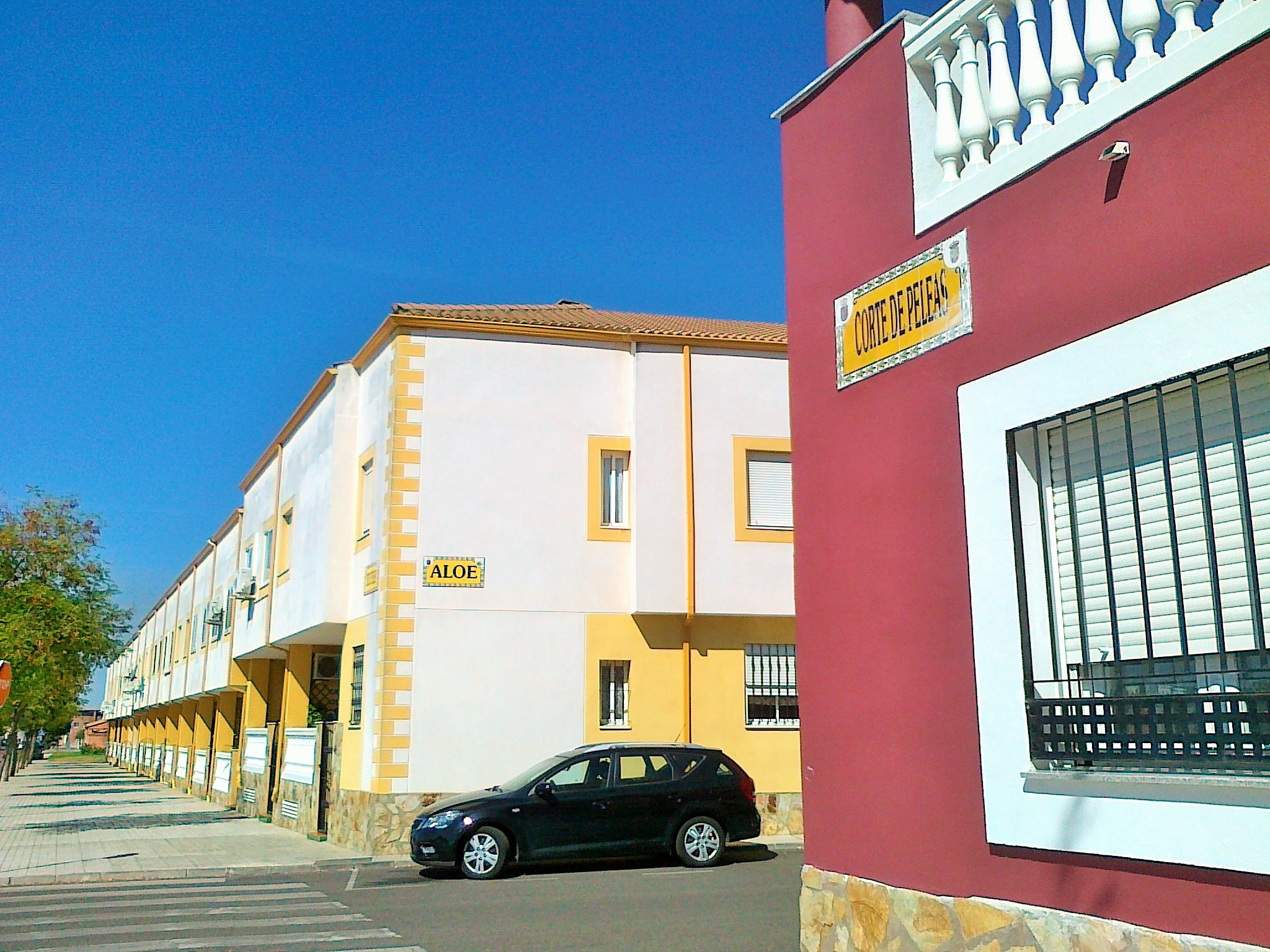

- Flag Coat of arms

- Location of Corte de Peleas within Extremadura
- Coordinates: 38°43′31″N 6°40′15″W
- Country: Spain
- Autonomous community: Extremadura
- Province: Badajoz
- Comarca: Tierra de Barros

Government
  - Alcalde: Ramón Pulido Corbacho

Area
  - Total: 42.3 km^{2} (16.3 sq mi)
- Elevation: 280 m (920 ft)

Population (2025-01-01)
  - Total: 1,153
- Time zone: UTC+1 (CET)
  - Summer (DST): UTC+2 (CEST)
- Website: Ayuntamiento de Corte de Peleas

Corte de Peleas is a Spanish municipality in the province of Badajoz, Extremadura. It has a population of 1,257 (2007) and an area of 42.3 km^{2}.

== See also ==
- List of municipalities in Badajoz
