= Gaëtan Varenne =

Association football player (born 1990)

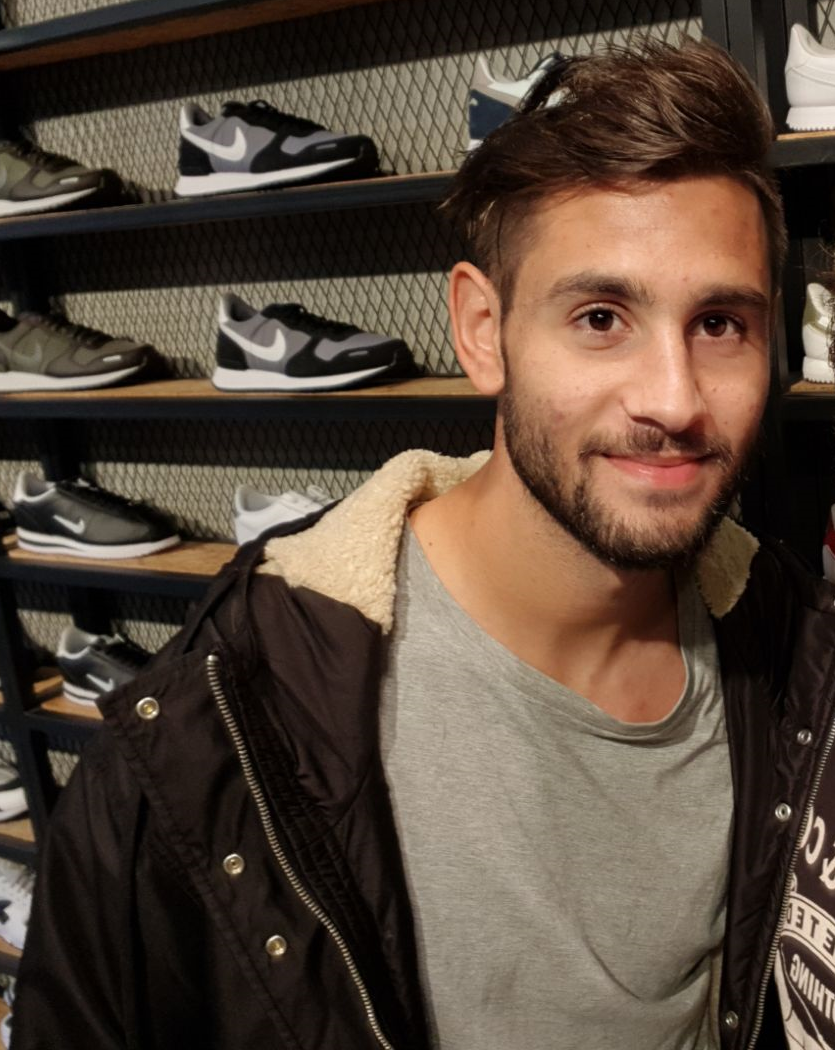
- Varenne in 2018

Personal information
- Full name: Gaëtan Antony Varenne
- Date of birth: 24 June 1990 (age 36)
- Place of birth: Le Puy-en-Velay, France
- Height: 1.87 m (6 ft 2 in)
- Position: Forward

Youth career
- 1998–2004: Puy-en-Velay
- 2000–2001: → Toulon (loan)
- 2004–2008: Montferrand
- 2008–2009: Clermont

Senior career*
Years	Team	Apps	(Gls)
2009–2012	Cournon	23	(28)
2012–2013	Bastia	2	(0)
2013–2014	Ashdod	8	(1)
2014–2015	Maccabi Yavne	22	(4)
2015–2017	Hapoel Jerusalem	69	(22)
2017–2020	Beitar Jerusalem	74	(19)
2020–2021	Hapoel Be'er Sheva	36	(7)
2021–2022	Bnei Sakhnin	0	(0)
Total		234	(81)
- * Club domestic league appearances and goals

Gaëtan Antony Varenne (Hebrew: גאטן וארן; born 24 June 1990) is a former professional footballer who played as a forward. He holds both French and Israeli citizenship.

== Early years ==
Varenne was born in Le Puy-en-Velay, France, and played for local club Le Puy en Velay from 1998 to 2004, punctuated by a brief stint at Toulon during the 2000–01 season. He joined the training club Montferrand where he remained for four seasons between 2004 and 2008, before being spotted by Clermont Foot with whom he played in U19 national the following season. Following this, Varenne was released by Clermont Foot Cournon in Auvergne.

== Club career ==
In the course of three seasons with CFA2 side Cournon-d'Auvergne, he gradually made a starting spot and became the top scorer of all Amateur Championships in France with no less than 28 goals. Varenne scored 11 goals in 2011–12 season, coming in second in the group. With this accomplishment, Clermont, Nantes, Bastia, Ajaccio and Dijon all showed interest. Varenne, overtaken by a trial in Dijon; on 27 June 2012 signed a two-year contract with the Corsican club Bastia. In November 2013, his contract with Bastia was terminated by mutual agreement.

In December 2013, Varenne signed with Israeli Premier League club F.C. Ashdod until the end of the year. After one goal and some exhibitions, he was injured and finished the season without a club. In summer 2014, after several unsuccessful trials in France, Varenne signed a two-year contract with Liga Leumit side Maccabi Yavne. Following this, he signed a two-year contract with Hapoel Jerusalem. After a very hopeful second season with Hapoel, Varenne signed a two-year contract with fellow Israeli Premier League side Beitar Jerusalem. He scored three goals during 2019–20 Toto Cup Al, and was the top scorer among Beitar players, leading To Beitar Jerusalem to win the cup.

In 2018, he was voted talent of the Year of the Israeli Premier League.

In summer 2023, at the age of 33, Varenne announced his retirement due to injury.

== Sexual assault ==
In March 2018, a video was released which showed Varenne and other, unnamed footballers sexually assaulting an unconscious woman. The Israel Football Association chose to not summon Varenne for a disciplinary hearing which received criticism from Michal Rozin of the Meretz party who also called for the player to be fired and his behaviour to be condemned. Varenne's club Beitar Jerusalem did not take any action either.

== Honours ==
Beitar Jerusalem

- Toto Cup: 2019–20
