= Moussa Bagayoko =

Israeli footballer

Personal information
- Full name: Moussa Bagayoko
- Date of birth: December 18, 1998 (age 27)
- Place of birth: Bamako, Mali
- Height: 1.81 m (5 ft 11 1/2 in)
- Position: Midfielder

Team information
- Current team: PSS Sleman
- Number: 8

Youth career
- Black Stars

Senior career*
Years	Team	Apps	(Gls)
2015–2017	Black Stars		
2017–2018	Elazığspor	16	(1)
2018–2020	Adanaspor	45	(0)
2020–2022	F.C. Ashdod	27	(2)
2021–2022	→ Hapoel Kfar Saba	27	(3)
2023–2024	Carabobo	17	(0)
2024–2025	Al-Shabab		
2025	Real Bamako		
2025–2026	Al-Watan	17	(1)
2026–	PSS Sleman	1	(0)

International career
2015–2019	Mali U23	4	(0)
- * Club domestic league appearances and goals as of 4 September 2026

Moussa Bagayoko (born 18 December 1998) is a Malian footballer who plays as a midfielder for Super League club PSS Sleman.

== Career ==
Bagayoko started his career in Black Stars.

On 2 October 2020, he signed for F.C. Ashdod from the Israeli Premier League.
