= Tom Ben Zaken =

Israeli association football player

Tom Ben Zaken טום בן זקן
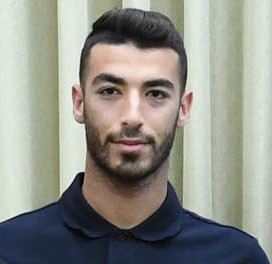

Personal information
- Full name: Tom Ben Zaken
- Date of birth: October 29, 1994 (age 32)
- Place of birth: Ashdod, Israel
- Position: Right back

Team information
- Current team: F.C. Ashdod
- Number: 15

Youth career
- F.C. Ashdod

Senior career*
Years	Team	Apps	(Gls)
2012–	F.C. Ashdod	216	(3)
- * Club domestic league appearances and goals as of 24 June 2026

Tom Ben Zaken (Hebrew: טום בן זקן) is an Israeli professional footballer who plays F.C. Ashdod.

== Career ==
Ben Zaken started his career in F.C. Ashdod. On 8 May 2012, Ben Zaken made his debut in the senior team in the 2–1 win against Bnei Sakhnin.

On 29 September 2018, Ben Zaken scored his debut career goal in the 1–4 loss against Maccabi Netanya.

== Honours ==
F.C. Ashdod

- Liga Leumit: 2015–16

== Career statistics ==
As of 1 July 2021.

Club	Season	League			State Cup		Toto Cup		Continental		Other		Total	
Club	Season	Division	Apps	Goals	Apps	Goals	Apps	Goals	Apps	Goals	Apps	Goals	Apps	Goals
F.C. Ashdod	2011–12	Israeli Premier League	1	0	0	0	0	0	0	0	0	0	1	0
F.C. Ashdod	2012–13	Israeli Premier League	1	0	0	0	1	0	0	0	0	0	2	0
F.C. Ashdod	2013–14	Israeli Premier League	0	0	0	0	0	0	0	0	0	0	0	0
F.C. Ashdod	2014–15	Israeli Premier League	5	0	0	0	3	0	0	0	0	0	8	0
F.C. Ashdod	2015–16	Liga Leumit	30	0	2	0	5	0	0	0	0	0	37	0
F.C. Ashdod	2016–17	Israeli Premier League	25	0	2	0	5	0	0	0	0	0	32	0
F.C. Ashdod	2017–18	Israeli Premier League	27	0	3	0	1	0	0	0	0	0	31	0
F.C. Ashdod	2018–19	Israeli Premier League	17	1	2	0	1	0	0	0	0	0	20	1
F.C. Ashdod	2019–20	Israeli Premier League	8	0	0	0	0	0	0	0	0	0	8	0
F.C. Ashdod	2020–21	Israeli Premier League	26	0	2	0	3	0	0	0	0	0	31	0
F.C. Ashdod	2021–22	Israeli Premier League	13	1	0	0	1	0	2	0	0	0	16	1
Career total			153	2	11	0	20	0	2	0	0	0	186	2
