= Georginho (footballer, born 1991) =

Brazilian footballer

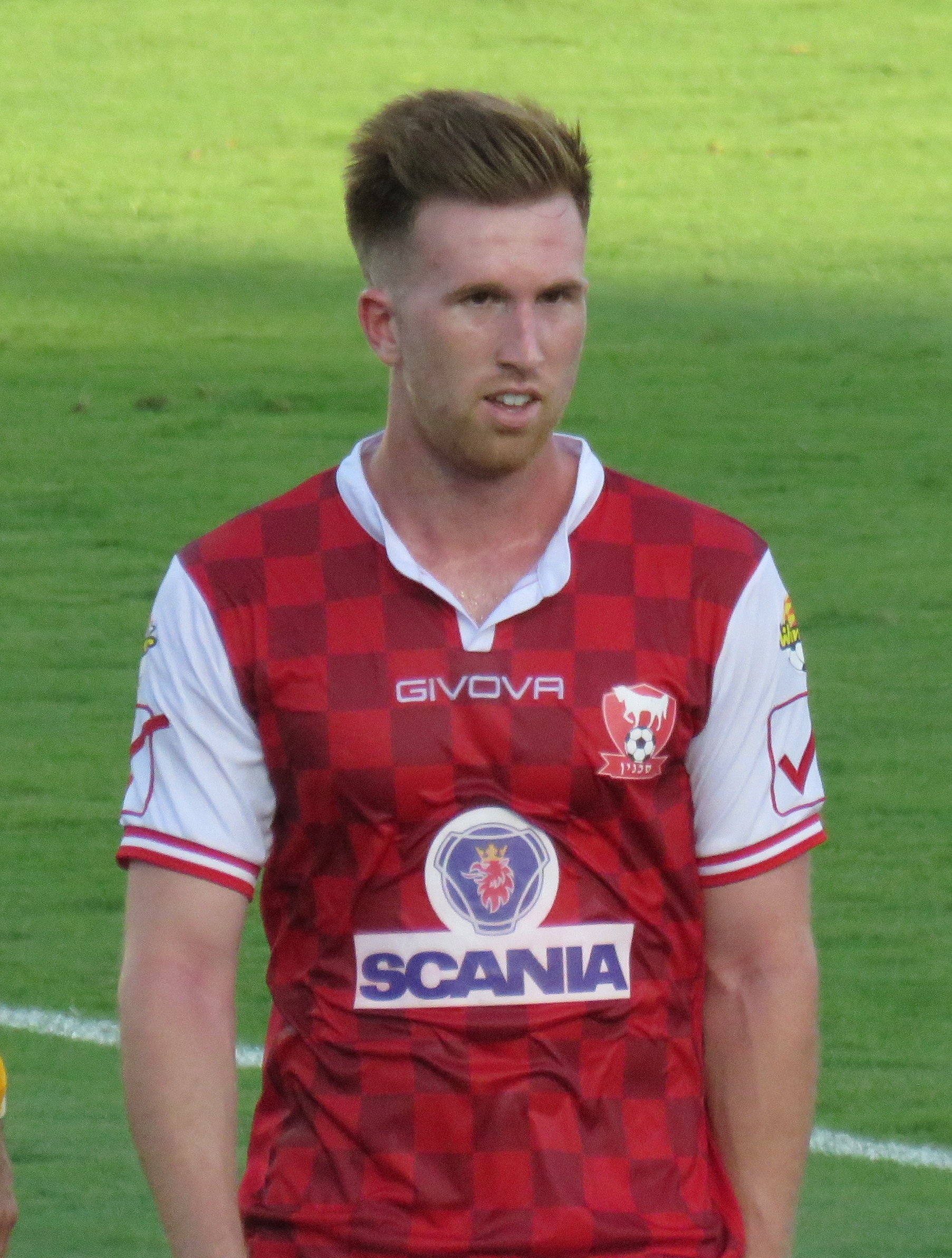
- Georginho playing for Bnei Sakhnin in 2015

Personal information
- Full name: George Minatto Paulino
- Date of birth: 25 March 1991 (age 35)
- Place of birth: Araranguá, Brazil
- Height: 1.86 m (6 ft 1 in)
- Position: Attacking midfielder

Team information
- Current team: Beitar Jerusalem
- Number: 10

Senior career*
Years	Team	Apps	(Gls)
2011	Criciúma Esporte Clube	1	(0)
2013–2014	Capivariano Futebol Clube	38	(5)
2013	→ CRB	1	(0)
2014	Guarani	1	(0)
2015	Capivariano	2	(0)
2015–2017	Bnei Sakhnin	62	(12)
2017–2019	Beitar Jerusalem	21	(3)
- * Club domestic league appearances and goals as of 27 December 2021

George Minatto Paulino (born 25 March 1991), commonly known as Georginho, is a Brazilian professional association football who last played for Beitar Jerusalem of the Israeli Premier League.
