= Shlomi Avisidris =

Israeli footballer

Shlomi Avisidris שלומי אביסידריס
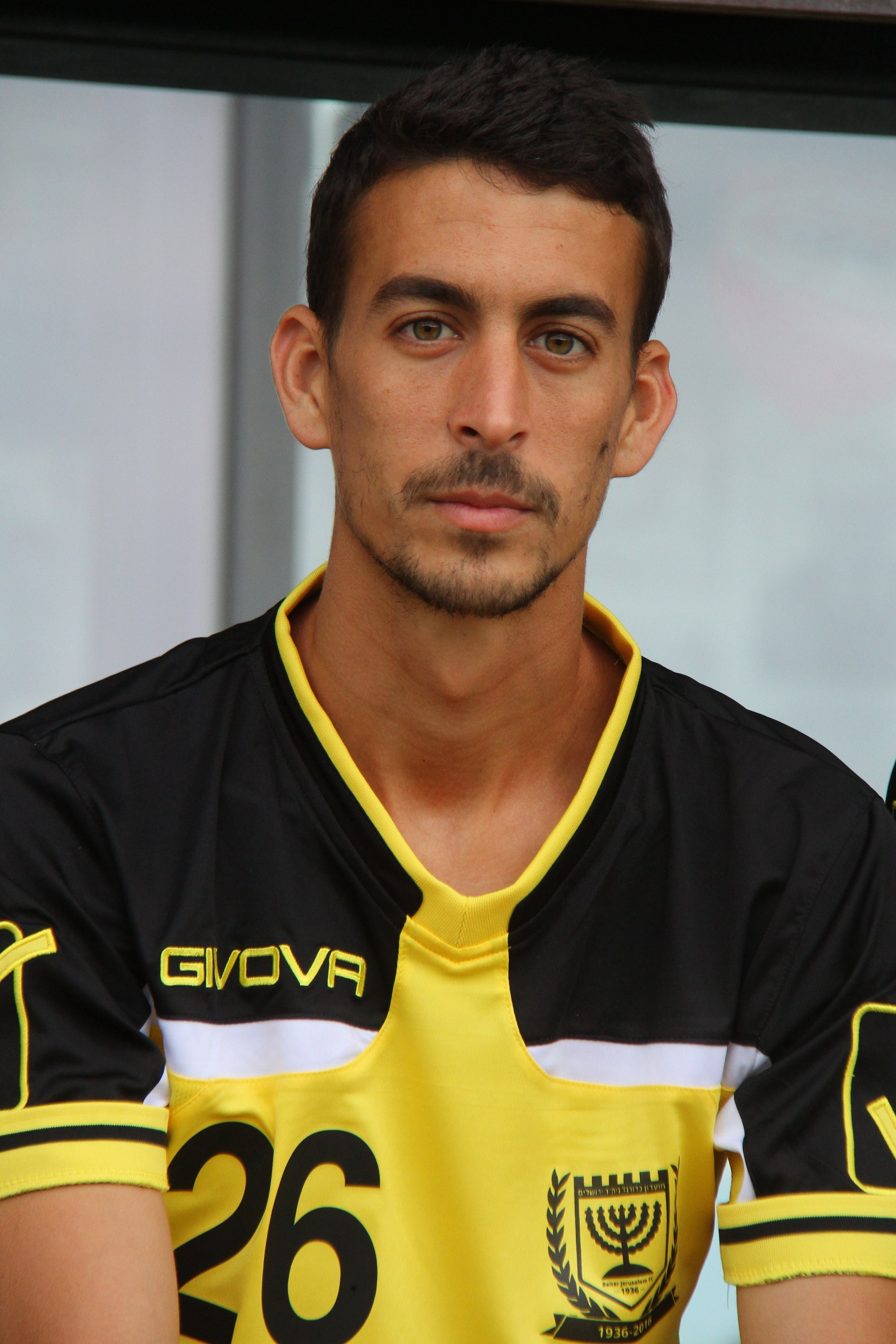
- Avisidris with Beitar Jerusalem in 2016

Personal information
- Full name: Shlomi Avisidris
- Date of birth: May 14, 1989 (age 37)
- Place of birth: Kiryat Shmona, Israel
- Position: Striker

Team information
- Current team: Bnei Maghar

Youth career
- Ironi Kiryat Shmona

Senior career*
Years	Team	Apps	(Gls)
2008–2013	Ironi Kiryat Shmona	41	(2)
2011–2012	→ Hapoel Ra'anana (loan)	15	(5)
2012	→ Bnei Yehuda (loan)	2	(0)
2012–2013	→ Hapoel Ramat Gan (loan)	2	(0)
2013	→ Hapoel Asi Gilboa (loan)	7	(0)
2013	Maccabi Umm al-Fahm	3	(0)
2013	F.C. Karmiel Safed	2	(1)
2014	→ Hapoel Ironi Safed (loan)	10	(2)
2014–2015	Hapoel Ironi Safed	22	(4)
2014	→ Hapoel Bnei Rameh (loan)	3	(1)
2015–2016	Hapoel Rishon LeZion	25	(5)
2016–2017	Beitar Jerusalem	10	(0)
2017–2018	Hapoel Rishon LeZion	14	(2)
2018	Hapoel Marmorek	6	(0)
2018	Hapoel Rishon LeZion	8	(0)
2018–2019	Hapoel Baqa al-Gharbiyye	2	(0)
2019	Maccabi Nujeidat	2	(0)
2019–2021	Hapoel Ironi Safed	37	(13)
2021	Hapoel Bnei Tuba-Zangariyye	5	(1)
2021–2022	Bnei M.M.B.E. HaGolan VeHaGalil	5	(4)
2024–	Bnei Maghar	2	(1)
- * Club domestic league appearances and goals as of 1 June 2024

Shlomi Avisidris (Hebrew: שלומי אביסידריס; born 14 May 1989) is an Israeli footballer. Avisidris is the only footballer who played in all leagues in his country.

== Career ==
Avisidris is a protege of Ironi Kiryat Shmona youth ranks and in 2008 he became a permanent player in the senior team. As part of the senior team, he scored the winning goal for Kiryat Shmona in the 2011 Toto Cup final, the first major trophy of the club. However, Avisidris' involvement in criminal activities, which included a conviction in drug offences, sent the player to loan periods in Hapoel Ra'anana, Bnei Yehuda, Hapoel Ramat Gan and Hapoel Asi Gilboa.

In September 2013, Avisidris was transferred from Kiryat Shmona to Maccabi Umm al-Fahm. However, the troubled team, which was included in Liga Leumit in the last moment and had to field its youth team for league matches, couldn't keep the player, and transferred him to Liga Alef club, F.C. Karmiel Safed. However, as Avisidris didn't fit in the club, he was loaned to Liga Gimel club, Hapoel Ironi Safed, with which Avisidris won the Upper Galilee division and was promoted to Liga Bet. The loan became a permanent transfer at the end of the season.

At the beginning of the 2015–16 season, Avisidris returned to the second division, as he was loaned to Hapoel Rishon LeZion.

On 20 June 2016 signed to the Israeli Premier League club Beitar Jerusalem.

== Honours ==
- Liga Leumit:
  - 2009–10
- Liga Gimel:
  - 2013–14
- Toto Cup Al:
  - 2010-11
- Toto Cup Leumit:
  - 2009–10
