= Ya'akov Berihon =

Israeli footballer (born 1993)

Ya'akov Brihon יעקב בריהון
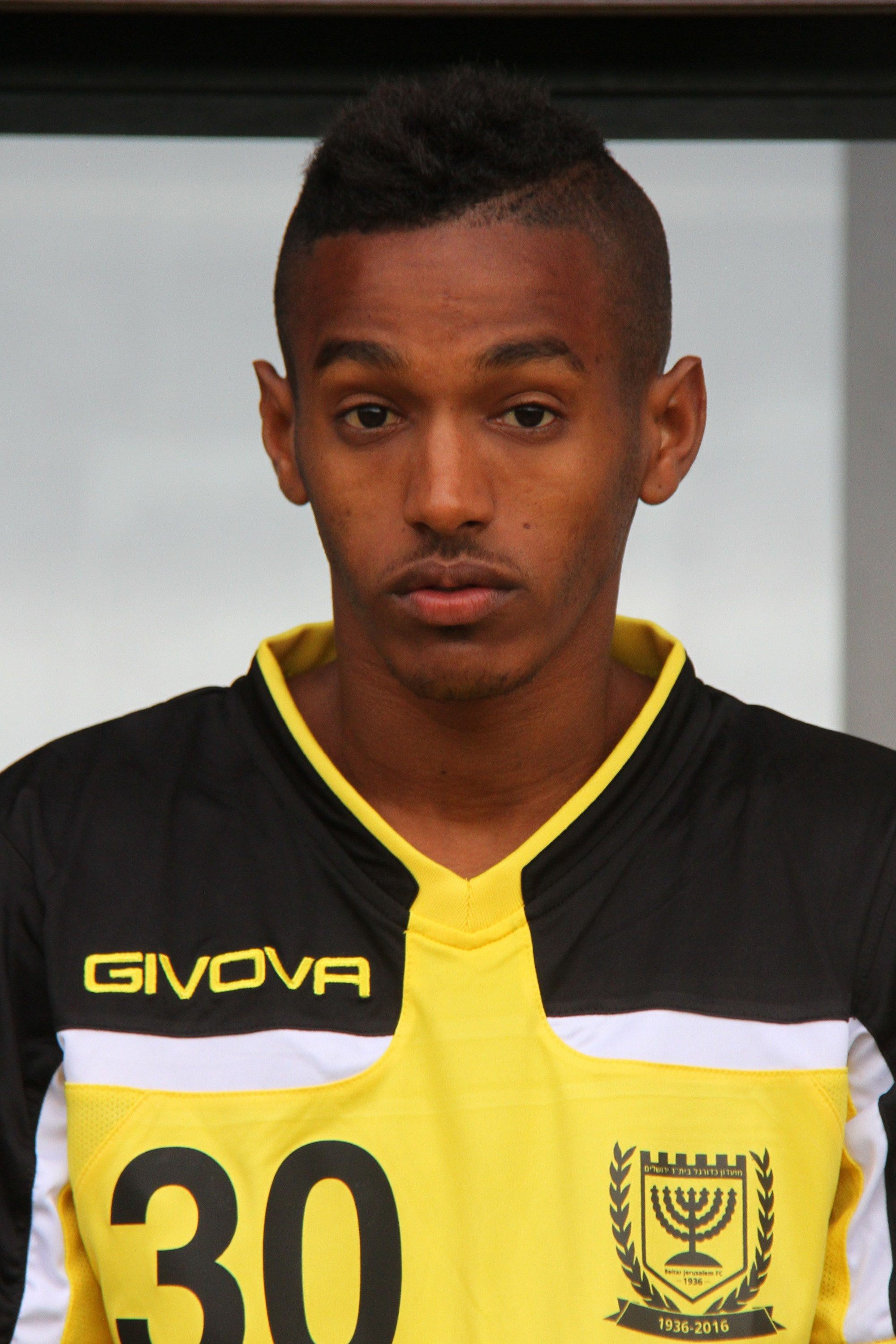
- Berihon with Beitar Jerusalem in 2016

Personal information
- Full name: Ya'akov Berihon
- Date of birth: July 6, 1993 (age 33)
- Place of birth: Rishon LeZion, Israel
- Height: 1.75 m (5 ft 9 in)
- Position: Winger

Youth career
- 2001–2011: Hapoel Rishon LeZion

Senior career*
Years	Team	Apps	(Gls)
2011–2016	Hapoel Rishon LeZion	43	(14)
2016–2019	Beitar Jerusalem	51	(6)
2019–2024	F.C. Ashdod	112	(11)
2024–2025	Hapoel Tel Aviv	8	(1)
- * Club domestic league appearances and goals as of 1 July 2025

Ya'akov Berihon (Hebrew: יעקב בריהון; born July 6, 1993) is an Israeli footballer.
