= Claudemir (footballer, born 1984) =

Brazilian footballer

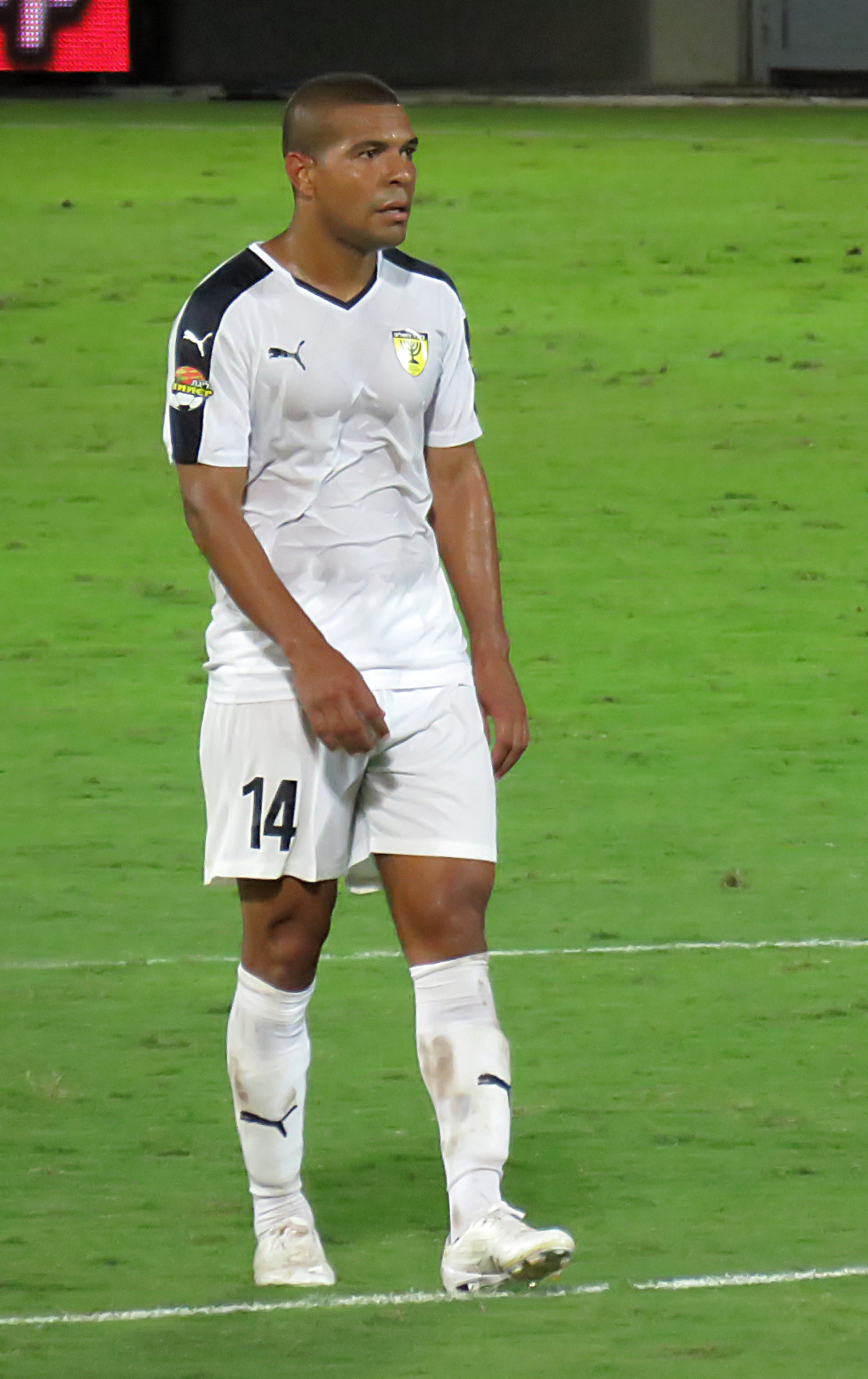
- Claudemir playing for Beitar Jerusalem in 2015

Personal information
- Full name: Claudemir Ferreira da Silva
- Date of birth: 17 August 1984 (age 42)
- Place of birth: Rio de Janeiro, Brazil
- Height: 1.73 m (5 ft 8 in)
- Positions: Fullback; midfielder

Senior career*
| Years | Team | Apps | (Gls) |
| 2003–2006 | Vasco da Gama | 68 | (3) |
| 2007 | Madureira | 14 | (0) |
| 2007 | → Marília (loan) | 32 | (5) |
| 2008 | Itumbiara | 0 | (0) |
| 2008 | Paraná | 11 | (0) |
| 2009–2010 | América (RJ) | 15 | (4) |
| 2010–2014 | Nacional | 102 | (23) |
| 2014–2018 | Beitar Jerusalem | 40 | (14) |
| 2018–2019 | Bnei Sakhnin | 11 | (0) |
| 2019 | Hapoel Tel Aviv | 18 | (4) |
| 2019–2020 | Hapoel Rishon LeZion | 21 | (2) |
| 2021 | Itumbiara | 1 | (0) |
- * Club domestic league appearances and goals as of 1 January 2021

Claudemir Ferreira da Silva (born 17 August 1984) is a Brazilian footballer.

Claudemir started his career at Vasco da Gama and played at Campeonato Brasileiro.
