= List of Israeli football transfers summer 2020 =

This is a list of Israeli football transfers for the 2020 Summer Transfer Window.

== Ligat Ha'Al ==
=== Beitar Jerusalem ===
In:

No.	Pos.	Nation	Player
—	DF	PAR	Santiago Ocampos (from (Italy) Juventus U19)
—	DF	ISR	Oren Biton (from Hapoel Be'er Sheva)
—	DF	ISR	Orel Dgani (from Hapoel Tel Aviv)
—	MF	BRA	Matheusinho (from (Brazil) América Mineiro)
—	FW	ISR	Uziel Pardo (loan return from Hapoel Ashkelon)
—	FW	SUR	Gleofilo Vlijter (from (Cyprus) Aris Limassol)
—	FW	ISR	Yarden Shua (from Maccabi Haifa)

Out:

No.	Pos.	Nation	Player
—	DF	ISR	Max Grechkin (on loan to (Ukraine) Zorya Luhansk)
—	DF	ISR	Yakir Artzi (on loan to Hapoel Ramat HaSharon)
—	DF	ISR	Ben Blau (to Ironi Modi'in, previously loaned to Beitar Ironi Ma'ale Adumim)
—	DF	ISR	Idan Weintraub (to Hakoah Amidar Ramat Gan, previously loaned to Hapoel Kfar Shalem)
—	MF	ISR	Hanan Maman (to Hapoel Haifa)
—	FW	FRA	Ange-Freddy Plumain (to (Turkey) Samsunspor)
—	FW	ISR	Eden Azuri (to Maccabi Sha'arayim, previously loaned)
—	FW	TRI	Levi García (to (Greece) AEK Athens)
—	FW	ISR	Shlomi Azulay (to (Romania) Astra Giurgiu)

=== Bnei Sakhnin ===
In:

No.	Pos.	Nation	Player
—	GK	PLE	Rami Hamadeh (from (Palestine) Hilal Al-Quds)
—	DF	NGA	Ikouwem Utin (on loan from Maccabi Haifa)
—	DF	COL	Oswaldo Henríquez (Free transfer)
—	DF	ISR	Yazan Nassar (from Bnei Sakhnin)
—	DF	ISR	Hagay Goldenberg (Free transfer)
—	MF	ISR	Moti Barshazki (from Hapoel Tel Aviv)
—	MF	BRA	Luanderson (from (Brazil) Náutico)
—	MF	LBR	Allen Njie (on loan from (Switzerland) Grasshopper Club Zürich)
—	MF	COL	Sebastián Velásquez (from (United States) Miami)
—	MF	ISR	Beram Kayal (Free transfer)
—	FW	SUR	Nigel Hasselbaink (Free transfer)

Out:

No.	Pos.	Nation	Player
—	DF	ISR	Ben Turjeman (to Hapoel Nof HaGalil)
—	DF	ISR	Kamal Falah (on loan to F.C. Haifa Robi Shapira)
—	DF	ISR	Ayman Khamza (to Hapoel Bu'eine, previously loaned to Hapoel Bnei Zalafa)
—	MF	ISR	Firas Mugrabi (to Ihud Bnei Shefa'-Amr)
—	FW	ISR	Liron Elimelech (to Ironi Tiberias)
—	MF	BRA	Luanderson (to (Brazil) América de Natal)
—	FW	ISR	Eli Elbaz (to Sektzia Nes Tziona)

=== Bnei Yehuda ===
In:

No.	Pos.	Nation	Player
—	GK	ISR	Barak Levi (from Hapoel Petah Tikva)
—	DF	ISR	Amit Cohen (on loan from Hapoel Ra'anana)
—	DF	ISR	Fadi Najar (from Maccabi Tel Aviv)
—	DF	BRA	Michael Rangel (from (Brazil) Flamengo)
—	MF	ISR	Eilon Elimelech (from Hapoel Iksal)
—	MF	NIG	Yussif Moussa (from (Finland) Ilves)
—	MF	CHI	Pedro Campos (from (Cyprus) Olympiakos Nicosia)
—	MF	ISR	Elian Ruhana (from F.C. Kafr Qasim)
—	MF	ISR	Stav Finish (from Maccabi Netanya)
—	FW	ISR	Niv Zrihan (from Hapoel Be'er Sheva)
—	FW	ISR	Amir Khalaila (from Hapoel Kaukab)

Out:

No.	Pos.	Nation	Player
—	GK	LTU	Emilijus Zubas (to (Turkey) Adana Demirspor)
—	GK	ISR	Yehonatan Shabi (to Hapoel Rishon LeZion)
—	DF	ISR	Paz Ben Ari (to Hapoel Petah Tikva)
—	DF	ISR	Dor Elo (to Ironi Kiryat Shmona, previously loaned from Hapoel Be'er Sheva)
—	DF	ISR	Daniel Plesher (to Maccabi Petah Tikva, previously loaned)
—	DF	ISR	Youssef Abu Tza'aluk (Free agent)
—	DF	ISR	Netanel Amoyal (on loan to Hapoel Ra'anana)
—	DF	ISR	Zach Baleli (to Hapoel Nof HaGalil, previously loaned to Hapoel Rishon LeZion)
—	MF	ISR	Ben Shimoni (on loan to Hapoel Ramat Gan)
—	MF	GHA	Joseph Mensah (Free agent)
—	MF	RSA	Mihlali Mayambela (loan return to (Portugal) Farense)
—	MF	ISR	Shay Golan (to Hapoel Petah Tikva, previously loaned from Maccabi Tel Aviv)
—	MF	ISR	Ohad Mualem (Free agent)
—	MF	ISR	Emil Edri (on loan to Hapoel Rishon LeZion)
—	MF	ISR	Eitan Velblum (on loan to (Romania) Mioveni)
—	MF	ISR	Eilon Elimelech (on loan to Hapoel Umm al-Fahm)
—	FW	ISR	Ben Azubel (to Maccabi Netanya)
—	FW	ISR	Dor Jan (to (Portugal) Paços Ferreira)

=== F.C. Ashdod ===
In:

No.	Pos.	Nation	Player
—	GK	ISR	Yoav Gerafi (from Hapoel Tel Aviv)
—	DF	ISR	Omri Ben Harush (from (Belgium) Lokeren)
—	DF	SRB	Nenad Cvetković (from (Serbia) Voždovac)
—	MF	MLI	Moussa Bagayoko (from (Turkey) Adanaspor)
—	FW	GHA	Hayford Adjei (from Hakoah Amidar Ramat Gan)
—	FW	ISR	Stav Turiel (from Maccabi Kabilio Jaffa)
—	FW	UGA	Fahad Bayo (from (Uganda) Vipers)

Out:

No.	Pos.	Nation	Player
—	GK	ISR	Omer Egozi (on loan to Hapoel Kfar Shalem)
—	DF	ISR	Osher Amos (on loan to Hapoel Rishon LeZion)
—	DF	ISR	Mor Edri (on loan to Augdat Sport Ashdod)
—	DF	ISR	Benel Edri (to Maccabi Sha'arayim, previously loaned to Sektzia Nes Tziona)
—	MF	CRC	Jimmy Marín (to (Costa Rica) Saprissa, previously loaned from Hapoel Be'er Sheva)
—	MF	BRA	Renan (to Hapoel Iksal, his player card still belongs to (Belgium) Roeselare)
—	MF	ISR	Naor Abudi (to (Armenia) Lori)
—	MF	GHA	Samuel Alabi (to (Switzerland) FC Luzern)
—	MF	ISR	Zohar Avisror (to Maccabi Tamra)
—	FW	ISR	Shoval Gozlan (to Hapoel Hadera, previously loaned from Maccabi Netanya)

=== Hapoel Be'er Sheva ===
In:

No.	Pos.	Nation	Player
—	DF	ISR	Dudu Twito (from Maccabi Petah Tikva)
—	DF	ISR	Noam Gamon (loan return from Hapoel Kfar Saba)
—	DF	ISR	Eitan Ratzon (from Hapoel Acre)
—	DF	ARG	Mariano Bareiro (on loan from (Argentina) Racing Club)
—	MF	ARG	Marcelo Meli (on loan from (Argentina) Racing Club)
—	MF	NED	Elton Acolatse (from (Belgium) Sint-Truiden, previously loaned)
—	MF	ISR	Sintayehu Sallalich (from Maccabi Haifa)
—	MF	ISR	Gal Levi (loan return from Hapoel Rishon LeZion)
—	FW	ISR	Rotem Hatuel (from Maccabi Ahi Nazareth)
—	FW	COL	Jonathan Agudelo (from (Colombia) Cúcuta Deportivo)

Out:

No.	Pos.	Nation	Player
—	GK	LTU	Ernestas Šetkus (to Hapoel Tel Aviv)
—	GK	ISR	Ido Levy (on loan to Hapoel Umm al-Fahm)
—	GK	ISR	Yarden Krishtul (to F.C. Kafr Qasim)
—	GK	ISR	Ziv Cohen (to Hapoel Nof HaGalil)
—	GK	ISR	Daniel Karadi (to Ironi Kuseife)
—	DF	ISR	Dor Elo (to Ironi Kiryat Shmona, previously loaned to Bnei Yehuda)
—	DF	ISR	Ben Bitton (on loan to Maccabi Tel Aviv)
—	DF	ISR	Oren Biton (to Beitar Jerusalem)
—	DF	ISR	Noy Haddad (to Hapoel Kfar Shalem)
—	DF	ISR	Shalev Avitan (on loan to Sektzia Nes Tziona)
—	DF	ISR	Roei Avitan (on loan to Hapoel Iksal)
—	DF	ISR	Noam Dey (to F.C. Dimona, previously loaned to Hakoah Amidar Ramat Gan)
—	DF	ISR	Orel Koriat (on loan to Maccabi Sha'arayim)
—	DF	ISR	Ilay Ben Shitrit (on loan to F.C. Dimona)
—	MF	CRC	Jimmy Marín (to (Costa Rica) Saprissa, previously loaned to F.C. Ashdod)
—	MF	CRC	Rashir Perkins (to (Costa Rica) LD Alajuelense)
—	MF	POR	David Simão (loan return to (Greece) AEK)
—	MF	ISR	Naor Sabag (to Maccabi Petah Tikva)
—	FW	ISR	Niv Zrihan (to Bnei Yehuda)
—	FW	ISR	Ben Sahar (on loan to (Cyprus) APOEL)
—	FW	ISR	Amran El Krenawy (to F.C. Kafr Qasim, previously loaned)
—	FW	ISR	Abdallah Abu Abed (on loan to Hapoel Kfar Shalem)
—	FW	ISR	Raz Buhbut (to Hapoel Hadera)
—	FW	ISR	Qais Ganem (on loan to Hapoel Haifa)

=== Hapoel Hadera ===
In:

No.	Pos.	Nation	Player
—	GK	ISR	Robi Levkovich (from (Hungary) Budapest Honvéd)
—	DF	ISR	Sa'ar Kalderon (from Maccabi Petah Tikva)
—	DF	PLE	Abdallah Jaber (from (Palestine) Ahli Al-Khaleel)
—	DF	ISR	Sahar Dabah (from Hapoel Umm al-Fahm)
—	DF	ISR	Noam Cohen (on loan from Maccabi Tel Aviv)
—	DF	ISR	Tal Kachila (Free transfer)
—	DF	ISR	Obieda Khattab (Free transfer)
—	MF	ISR	Reef Mesika (from Hapoel Umm al-Fahm)
—	MF	ISR	Yarden Cohen (from F.C. Kafr Qasim)
—	MF	ISR	Omer Lakou (on loan from Ironi Kiryat Shmona)
—	MF	CIV	Yaya Meledje (from (Bulgaria) Beroe)
—	MF	BRA	Gustavo Marmentini (loan from (Brazil) Atlético Paranaense-B)
—	MF	ISR	Tamir Glazer (on loan from Maccabi Tel Aviv)
—	MF	CMR	Rodrigue Bongongui (from (Slovenia) Tabor Sežana)
—	MF	ISR	Maxim Plakuschenko (on loan from Maccabi Haifa)
—	MF	ISR	Dor Nahmani (from Hapoel Herzliya)
—	FW	ISR	Assi Guma (loan return from Hapoel Ramat Gan)
—	FW	ISR	Shoval Gozlan (from Maccabi Netanya)
—	FW	ISR	Dor Moskovich (from Beitar Tel Aviv Bat Yam)
—	FW	NGA	Odah Marshall (from (Iraq) Naft Al-Wasat)
—	FW	ISR	Raz Buhbut (from Hapoel Be'er Sheva)

Out:

No.	Pos.	Nation	Player
—	GK	NGA	Austin Ejide (to Sektzia Nes Tziona)
—	DF	ISR	Hagay Goldenberg (Free agent)
—	DF	ISR	Yarin Hassan (Free agent)
—	MF	ISR	Solomon Daniel (to Hapoel Ramat HaSharon)
—	MF	USA	George Fochive (to Hapoel Kfar Saba)
—	MF	ISR	Eliel Peretz (to (Austria) Wolfsberger AC)
—	MF	ISR	Mohammad Abu Fani (loan return to Maccabi Haifa)
—	FW	BRA	Lúcio Maranhão (to Ironi Kiryat Shmona)
—	FW	ISR	Yehonathan Levy (to Maccabi Petah Tikva, previously loaned to Hapoel Tel Aviv)
—	FW	ISR	Dor Moskovich (to Hapoel Petah Tikva)
—	FW	ISR	Amit Mor (on loan to Hapoel Afula)

=== Hapoel Haifa ===
In:

No.	Pos.	Nation	Player
—	DF	ISR	Yahav Gurfinkel (From Maccabi Haifa)
—	DF	ISR	Raz Nachmias (from Sektzia Nes Tziona)
—	DF	ISR	Ido Levy (from Hapoel Ra'anana)
—	MF	ISR	Ruslan Barsky (on loan from Maccabi Tel Aviv)
—	MF	ISR	Ido Shahar (on loan from Maccabi Tel Aviv)
—	MF	ISR	Bar Cohen (on loan from Maccabi Tel Aviv)
—	MF	ISR	Hanan Maman (to Hapoel Haifa)
—	MF	ISR	Dor Nahmani (to Hapoel Herzliya)
—	FW	ISR	Ahmed Drawshe (from F.C. Kafr Qasim)
—	FW	ISR	Raz Stain (from Sektzia Nes Tziona)
—	FW	NGA	William Agada (on loan from Hapoel Jerusalem)
—	FW	ISR	Qais Ganem (on loan from Hapoel Be'er Sheva)

Out:

No.	Pos.	Nation	Player
—	GK	ISR	Oren Tal (at Hapoel Baqa al-Gharbiyye)
—	DF	ISR	Ofek Fishler (on loan to Maccabi Ahi Nazareth)
—	DF	ISR	Niv Serdal (to Hapoel Tel Aviv, previously loaned to Hapoel Petah Tikva)
—	DF	ISR	Eli Balilty (to Hapoel Nof HaGalil)
—	DF	SRB	Nikola Gulan ( (Sweden) BK Häcken)
—	DF	ISR	Ohad Elbilia (to Hapoel Acre, previously loaned)
—	MF	GNB	Francisco Júnior (to (Romania) Gaz Metan Mediaș)
—	MF	ISR	Gidi Kanyuk (to (Thailand) Buriram United)
—	MF	ISR	Gil Vermouth (Free agent)
—	MF	FRA	Kevin Tapoko (to (France) Grenoble, his player card still belongs to Hapoel Be'er Sheva)
—	MF	ISR	Murad Hujirat (on loan to Hapoel Baqa al-Gharbiyye)
—	MF	ISR	Snir Talias (on loan from Hapoel Iksal)
—	FW	SVK	Jakub Sylvestr (to (India) Chennaiyin)
—	FW	ISR	Ofir Mizrahi (to Ironi Kiryat Shmona)
—	FW	ISR	Aner Shechter (to Sektzia Nes Tziona)

=== Hapoel Kfar Saba ===
In:

No.	Pos.	Nation	Player
—	GK	ISR	Matan Zalmanovic (from Sektzia Nes Tziona)
—	DF	ISR	Maor Gerassi (from Hapoel Rishon LeZion)
—	DF	ISR	Omer Danino (from Maccabi Petah Tikva)
—	MF	USA	George Fochive (from Hapoel Hadera)
—	MF	ISR	Omer Barami (from Maccabi Tel Aviv)
—	MF	ISR	Raz Cohen (from Hapoel Tel Aviv)
—	MF	ISR	Or Dasa (on loan from Hapoel Ra'anana)
—	MF	NGA	Michael Omoh (from (Romania) Politehnica Iași)
—	FW	GUI	Kerfala Cissoko (from (Sweden) Dalkurd)

Out:

No.	Pos.	Nation	Player
—	GK	ISR	Igal Becker (to Hapoel Tel Aviv)
—	DF	ISR	Jenia Berkman (to Hapoel Nof HaGalil)
—	DF	ISR	Noam Gamon (loan return to Hapoel Be'er Sheva)
—	DF	ISR	Eliran Saimon (Free agent)
—	DF	ISR	Lev Cohen (to Hapoel Ramat Gan, prebiously loaned to Hapoel Nof HaGalil)
—	MF	ISR	Adrian Rochet (to Ironi Kiryat Shmona)
—	MF	GHA	Gershon Koffie (Free agent)
—	MF	ISR	Ayman Kharbat (Free agent)
—	MF	ISR	Dan Azaria (to Hapoel Tel Aviv)
—	MF	PLE	Mahmoud Yousef (to Hapoel Bu'eine)
—	FW	NGA	Benjamin Kuku (to F.C. Kafr Qasim, previously loaned to Hapoel Petah Tikva)
—	FW	SEN	Boubacar Traorè (to (Switzerland) FC St. Gallen)
—	FW	ISR	Omri Mansour (to Hapoel Ramat HaSharon, previously loaned to Hapoel Baqa al-Gharbiyye)
—	FW	ISR	Amit Yeverbaum (to Hapoel Petah Tikva)
—	FW	ISR	Noor Bisan (to Maccabi Kabilio Jaffa)

=== Hapoel Tel Aviv ===
In:

No.	Pos.	Nation	Player
—	GK	LTU	Ernestas Šetkus (from Hapoel Be'er Sheva)
—	GK	ISR	Igal Becker (from Hapoel Kfar Saba)
—	DF	ISR	Niv Serdal (from Hapoel Haifa, previously loaned to Hapoel Petah Tikva)
—	DF	ISR	Amid Mahajna (on loan from Beitar Tubruk)
—	DF	RSA	Siyanda Xulu (from (South Africa) Maritzburg United)
—	DF	ISR	Adi Gotlieb (from (Russia) Orenburg)
—	MF	PAN	Armando Cooper (from (Panama) Árabe Unido)
—	MF	PAN	Omar Browne (from (Panama) San Carlos)
—	MF	ISR	Dan Azaria (from Hapoel Kfar Saba)
—	FW	ISR	Eden Hershkovitz (loan return from Hapoel Ramat Gan)
—	FW	GEO	Levan Kutalia (from (Kazakhstan) Irtysh Pavlodar)
—	FW	ISR	Gil Itzhak (Free transfer)

Out:

No.	Pos.	Nation	Player
—	GK	ISR	Yoav Gerafi (to F.C. Ashdod)
—	GK	ISR	Arik Yanko (to Maccabi Petah Tikva)
—	DF	ISR	Mor Naaman (on loan to Hapoel Ramat Gan)
—	DF	ISR	Idan Cohen (To (United States) Hartford Athletic)
—	DF	BEL	Marvin Peersman (to (Greece) PAS Giannina)
—	DF	ISR	Yarin Peretz (to (Cyprus) Karmiotissa)
—	DF	ISR	Orel Dgani (to Beitar Jerusalem)
—	DF	ISR	Abbade Farhat (to Hapoel Umm al-Fahm)
—	DF	ISR	Tom Ahi Mordechai (on loan to Hapoel Kfar Shalem)
—	MF	URU	Felipe Rodríguez (to (Argentina) Aldosivi)
—	MF	ISR	Nir Lax (to (Romania) Petrolul Ploiești)
—	MF	ISR	Maor Buzaglo (Free agent)
—	MF	ISR	Moti Barshazki (to Bnei Sakhnin)
—	MF	ISR	Raz Cohen (to Hapoel Kfar Saba)
—	MF	ISR	Amit Meir (to Maccabi Petah Tikva)
—	MF	PAN	Omar Browne (Free agent)
—	MF	ISR	Roy Dayan (to F.C. Kafr Qasim)
—	FW	NGA	Michael Olaha (on loan to Hapoel Kfar Shalem)
—	FW	ISR	Yehonathan Levy (to Maccabi Petah Tikva, previously loaned to Hapoel Hadera)
—	FW	ISR	Ali Kna'ana (on loan to Maccabi Ahi Nazareth)
—	FW	ISR	Omer Damari (Free agent)
—	FW	ISR	Ali El Ubra (on loan to Sektzia Nes Tziona)

=== Ironi Kiryat Shmona ===
In:

No.	Pos.	Nation	Player
—	DF	ISR	Dor Elo (from Hapoel Be'er Sheva)
—	MF	ISR	Adrian Rochet (from Hapoel Kfar Saba)
—	MF	ISR	Roi Kahat (from Maccabi Netanya)
—	MF	ISR	Yadin Lugasi (loan return from Hapoel Acre)
—	FW	BRA	Lúcio Maranhão (from Hapoel Hadera)
—	FW	ISR	Ofir Mizrahi (from Hapoel Haifa)
—	FW	GHA	Eugene Ansah (on loan from Hapoel Ra'anana)
—	MF	ISR	Yoav Hofmayster (on loan from (Austria) LASK)
—	FW	GAM	Seikou Toure (on loan from Maccabi Haifa)

Out:

No.	Pos.	Nation	Player
—	GK	ISR	Gad Amos (to Maccabi Ahi Nazareth)
—	GK	ISR	Daniel Benesh (to Hapoel Ra'anana)
—	DF	ISR	Gal Shish (Free agent)
—	DF	BRA	Marcus Diniz (to Maccabi Petah Tikva)
—	DF	ISR	Ori Tzaadon (Free agent)
—	DF	NZL	Dylan de Jong (Free agent)
—	DF	ISR	Idan Ratta (loan return to Hapoel Ramat HaSharon)
—	DF	ISR	Samuel Scheimann (to (Netherlands) VV Katwijk)
—	MF	BRA	Silas (loan return to (Ukraine) Zorya Luhansk)
—	MF	ISR	Omer Lakou (on loan to Hapoel Hadera)
—	MF	ISR	Ismaeel Ryan (to (Turkey) Adanaspor)
—	MF	ISR	Roy Hacker (to Hapoel Afula)
—	FW	JAM	Maalique Foster (loan return to (Costa Rica) LD Alajuelense)
—	FW	ISR	Yoel Abuhatzira (Free agent)
—	FW	ISR	Ahmed Abed (to Maccabi Ahi Nazareth)

=== Maccabi Haifa ===
In:

No.	Pos.	Nation	Player
—	DF	SRB	Bogdan Planić (from (Romania) FCSB)
—	DF	ISR	Tom Skolvin (from Hapoel Nof HaGalil)
—	DF	ISR	Taleb Tawatha (from (Bulgaria) Ludogorets Razgrad)
—	MF	ISR	Mohammad Abu Fani (loan return from Hapoel Hadera)
—	MF	ISR	Oded Chekol (from Hapoel Nof HaGalil)
—	MF	ESP	José Rodríguez (from (Spain) Málaga)
—	FW	GAM	Seikou Toure (loan return from Sektzia Nes Tziona)
—	FW	ISR	Yahav El Abed (from Beitar Tel Aviv Bat Yam)
—	FW	GHA	Godsway Donyoh (from (Denmark) Nordsjælland)

Out:

No.	Pos.	Nation	Player
—	GK	USA	Joe Kuzminsky (loan return to (United States) Charleston Battery)
—	GK	ISR	Gil Ofek (Retired)
—	GK	ISR	Guy Haimov (Retired)
—	GK	ISR	Shareef Kayouf (on loan to Hapoel Kfar Shalem)
—	DF	ISR	Yahav Gurfinkel (on loan to Hapoel Haifa)
—	DF	ISR	Shay Ben David (on loan to (Spain) San Fernando)
—	DF	GHA	David Acquah (on loan to Hapoel Nof HaGalil)
—	DF	NGA	Ikouwem Utin (on loan to Bnei Sakhnin)
—	DF	ISR	Hanan Biton (on loan to Hapoel Acre)
—	DF	AUS	Trent Sainsbury (to (Belgium) Kortrijk)
—	DF	ISR	Daniel Mor Yosef (on loan to Hapoel Ramat Gan)
—	DF	ISR	Tom Skolvin (on loan to Hapoel Nof HaGalil)
—	DF	ISR	Ange Andino (on loan to Hapoel Acre)
—	DF	ISR	Yonatan Levi (on loan to Hapoel Iksal)
—	MF	ISR	Sintayehu Sallalich (to Hapoel Be'er Sheva)
—	MF	ISR	Maxim Plakuschenko (on loan to Hapoel Hadera)
—	MF	ISR	Oded Chekol (on loan to Hapoel Nof HaGalil)
—	MF	ISR	Ibrahim Jawabry (on loan to Hapoel Iksal)
—	FW	ISR	Suf Podgureanu (to (Italy) Roma)
—	FW	ISR	Gil Haddad (to Hapoel Ra'anana, previously loaned to F.C. Haifa Robi Shapira)
—	FW	ISR	Dor Edri (on loan to Hapoel Ramat Gan)
—	FW	ISR	Mohammed Awaed (on loan to (Poland) Lech Poznań)
—	FW	GAM	Seikou Toure (on loan to Ironi Kiryat Shmona)
—	FW	ISR	Gil Itzhak (Free Agent)
—	FW	ISR	Yarden Shua (to Beitar Jerusalem)

=== Maccabi Netanya ===
In:

No.	Pos.	Nation	Player
—	GK	ISR	Roy Leib (from Hapoel Ra'anana)
—	DF	NOR	Akinshola Akinyemi (from (Bulgaria) Lokomotiv Plovdiv)
—	DF	ISR	Ido Vaier (from Hapoel Herzliya)
—	DF	NED	Kellian van der Kaap (from (Netherlands) Cambuur)
—	MF	ISR	Yarin Sharabi (loan return from Hapoel Acre)
—	MF	ZAM	Lameck Banda (on loan from (Russia) Arsenal Tula)
—	FW	JAM	Kevaughn Frater (from (India) Bengaluru)
—	FW	ISR	Ben Azubel (from Bnei Yehuda)

Out:

No.	Pos.	Nation	Player
—	GK	ISR	Razi Abu Hamdan (on loan to Hapoel Acre)
—	GK	ISR	Roi Beigel (to Hapoel Rishon LeZion)
—	DF	ISR	Muhammed Zbidat (to Hapoel Ramat Gan)
—	DF	ISR	Viki Kahlon (Free agent)
—	DF	GER	Tim Heubach (Free agent)
—	DF	ISR	Tzlil Nehemia (to Hapoel Petah Tikva)
—	DF	SRB	Lazar Ćirković (Free agent)
—	DF	ISR	Assaf Ben Shabat (to Hapoel Herzliya, previously loaned to Hapoel Azor)
—	MF	ISR	Roi Kahat (to Ironi Kiryat Shmona)
—	MF	ISR	Stav Finish (to Bnei Yehuda)
—	MF	ISR	Nico Olsak (to (Netherlands) RKC Waalwijk)
—	MF	ISR	Aviv Biton (to Hapoel Umm al-Fahm)
—	FW	MNE	Fatos Beciraj (to (Poland) Wisła Kraków)
—	FW	ISR	Shoval Gozlan (to Hapoel Hadera, previously loaned to F.C. Ashdod)
—	FW	ISR	Guy Melamed (to (Scotland) St Johnstone)

=== Maccabi Petah Tikva ===
In:

No.	Pos.	Nation	Player
—	GK	ISR	Arik Yanko (from Hapoel Tel Aviv)
—	DF	BRA	Marcus Diniz (from Ironi Kiryat Shmona)
—	DF	ISR	Mohammed Hindy (from F.C. Kafr Qasim)
—	DF	ISR	Omri Luzon (from Hapoel Rishon LeZion)
—	DF	ISR	Yarden Cohen (on loan from Hapoel Ra'anana)
—	DF	ISR	Daniel Plesher (from Maccabi Petah Tikva, previously loaned)
—	MF	ISR	Amit Meir (from Hapoel Tel Aviv)
—	MF	ISR	Yinon Eliyahu (from Hapoel Ramat Gan)
—	MF	GHA	Elvis Sakyi (from (Malta) Senglea Athletic)
—	MF	ISR	Naor Sabag (from Hapoel Be'er Sheva)
—	FW	ISR	Roy Ronen (from Hapoel Ramat HaSharon)
—	FW	ISR	Yehonathan Levy (from Hapoel Tel Aviv)
—	FW	ISR	Elior Mishali (from Hapoel Ramat HaSharon)
—	FW	BIH	Asmir Suljić (Free transfer)
—	FW	PAN	Abdiel Arroyo (from (Australia) Newcastle Jets)
—	FW	POR	Jucie Lupeta ( (Slovenia) Olimpija Ljubljana)

Out:

No.	Pos.	Nation	Player
—	GK	ISR	Yossi Ginzburg (to Hapoel Afula)
—	GK	ISR	Zahi Gigi (Free Agent)
—	DF	ISR	Roei Maoz (on loan to Shimshon Kafr Qasim)
—	DF	ISR	Omri Luzon (to (England) Reading)
—	DF	ISR	Sa'ar Kalderon (to Hapoel Hadera)
—	DF	ISR	Daniel Busi (to Shimshon Kafr Qasim)
—	DF	ISR	Dudu Twito (to Hapoel Be'er Sheva)
—	DF	ISR	Idan Adheneny (on loan to F.C. Kafr Qasim)
—	DF	ISR	Teva Barret (on loan to Maccabi Kabilio Jaffa)
—	DF	ISR	Omer Danino (to Hapoel Kfar Saba)
—	DF	ISR	Osher Abu (to Hapoel Iksal)
—	DF	ISR	Ori Artzi (on loan to Hapoel Bik'at HaYarden)
—	MF	ISR	Yisrael Zaguri (to Hapoel Ramat Gan)
—	MF	ISR	Tomer Benbenishti (on loan to Hapoel Kfar Shalem)
—	MF	BEL	Geoffrey Mujangi Bia (Free Agent)
—	MF	ISR	Ido Davidov (to Hapoel Umm al-Fahm)
—	MF	ISR	Yehonathan Mevshov (to F.C. Ironi Or Yehuda)
—	MF	ISR	Dan Kaduri (on loan to Hapoel Rishon LeZion)
—	MF	ISR	Lidor Cohen (to (Georgia (country)) Dila Gori)
—	MF	ISR	Itay Tako (to Hapoel Umm al-Fahm, previously loaned to Hapoel Ashkelon)
—	FW	ISR	Dor Hugi (to (Austria) SKN St. Pölten)
—	FW	ISR	Moha Badir (to Hapoel Afula, previously loaned to Agudat Sport Ashdod)
—	FW	ANG	Evandro Brandão (Free Agent)
—	FW	ISR	Yehonathan Levy (to Hapoel Ramat HaSharon)
—	FW	ISR	Elior Mishali (to Hapoel Petah Tikva)

=== Maccabi Tel Aviv ===
In:

No.	Pos.	Nation	Player
—	GK	ISR	Daniel Peretz (on loan return from Beitar Tel Aviv Bat Yam)
—	DF	ISR	Ben Bitton (on loan from Hapoel Be'er Sheva)
—	DF	ESP	Luis Hernández (from (Spain) Málaga)
—	MF	ISR	Dan Biton (on loan from (Bulgaria) Ludogorets Razgrad)
—	MF	RSA	Rowan Human (from (South Africa) Bidvest Wits)
—	FW	ISR	Tal Ben Haim (from (Czech Republic) Sparta Prague)
—	FW	PAN	Eduardo Guerrero (loan return from Beitar Tel Aviv Bat Yam)
—	FW	SRB	Aleksandar Pešić (from (Saudi Arabia) Al-Ittihad)

Out:

No.	Pos.	Nation	Player
—	GK	GRE	Andreas Gianniotis (on loan to (Greece) Atromitos)
—	GK	ISR	Omer Katz (to Hapoel Petah Tikva)
—	DF	POR	André Geraldes (to (Cyprus) APOEL, his player card still belongs to (Portugal) Sporting CP)
—	DF	ISR	Omer Itzhak (on loan to Beitar Tel Aviv Bat Yam)
—	DF	ISR	Bar Nataniel (to Hapoel Kfar Shalem)
—	DF	ESP	Jair Amador (to (Spain) Real Zaragoza)
—	DF	ISR	Fadi Najar (to Bnei Yehuda, previously loaned to Beitar Tel Aviv Bat Yam)
—	MF	ISR	Omer Barami (to Hapoel Kfar Saba, previously loaned to Beitar Tel Aviv Bat Yam)
—	MF	ISR	Ruslan Barsky (on loan to Hapoel Haifa)
—	MF	ISR	Omri Ran (on loan to Beitar Tel Aviv Bat Yam)
—	MF	ISR	Guy Mizrahi (on loan to Beitar Tel Aviv Bat Yam)
—	MF	ISR	Nadav Aviv Nidam (on loan to Beitar Tel Aviv Bat Yam)
—	MF	ISR	Shay Balahssan (on loan to Beitar Tel Aviv Bat Yam)
—	MF	CIV	Parfait Guiagon (on loan to Beitar Tel Aviv Bat Yam)
—	MF	ISR	Omer Atzili (to (Cyprus) APOEL)
—	MF	ISR	Dor Micha (to (Cyprus) Anorthosis)
—	MF	ISR	Shay Golan (to Hapoel Petah Tikva, previously loaned to Bnei Yehuda)
—	MF	RSA	Rowan Human (on loan to Beitar Tel Aviv Bat Yam)
—	FW	ISR	Rave Asayag (on loan to Beitar Tel Aviv Bat Yam)
—	FW	NGA	Chikeluba Ofoedu (Free agent)
—	FW	ISR	Ronen Hanchis (on loan to Beitar Tel Aviv Bat Yam)

== Liga Leumit ==
=== Beitar Tel Aviv Bat Yam ===
In:

No.	Pos.	Nation	Player
—	GK	ISR	Avihay Dahan (from Hakoah Amidar Ramat Gan)
—	DF	ISR	Omer Itzhak (on loan from Maccabi Tel Aviv)
—	DF	ISR	Guy Kaufmann (from Hapoel Marmorek)
—	MF	ISR	Omri Ran (on loan from Maccabi Tel Aviv)
—	MF	ISR	Nadav Aviv Nidam (on loan from Maccabi Tel Aviv)
—	MF	ISR	Shay Balahssan (on loan from Maccabi Tel Aviv)
—	MF	CIV	Parfait Guiagon (on loan from Maccabi Tel Aviv)
—	MF	ZAM	Ngosa Sunzu (from (Zambia) Buildcon)
—	MF	RSA	Rowan Human (on loan from Maccabi Tel Aviv)
—	FW	ISR	Rave Asayag (on loan from Maccabi Tel Aviv)
—	FW	ISR	Yaniv Mizrahi (from Hakoah Amidar Ramat Gan)
—	FW	ISR	Ronen Hanchis (on loan from Maccabi Tel Aviv)

Out:

No.	Pos.	Nation	Player
—	GK	ISR	Aviad Miyara (to Hapoel Umm al-Fahm)
—	DF	ISR	Liel Biton (to Sektzia Nes Tziona)
—	DF	ISR	Yuval Deri (on loan to Maccabi Ironi Ashdod)
—	DF	ISR	Yoav Rappaport (on loan to Maccabi Ironi Ashdod)
—	DF	ISR	Fadi Najar (to Bnei Yehuda, previously loaned from Maccabi Tel Aviv)
—	MF	ISR	Omer Barami (to Hapoel Kfar Saba, previouslt loaned from Maccabi Tel Aviv)
—	MF	ISR	Tamir Glazer (to Hapoel Hadera, his player card still belongs to Maccabi Tel Aviv)
—	MF	ISR	Ido Shahar (to Hapoel Haifa, his player card still belongs to Maccabi Tel Aviv)
—	MF	ISR	Bar Cohen (to Hapoel Haifa, his player card still belongs to Maccabi Tel Aviv)
—	FW	PAN	Eduardo Guerrero (loan return to Maccabi Tel Aviv)
—	FW	ISR	Dor Moskovich (to Hapoel Hadera)
—	FW	ISR	Yahav El Abed (to Maccabi Haifa)

=== F.C. Kafr Qasim ===
In:

No.	Pos.	Nation	Player
—	GK	ISR	Yarden Krishtul (from Hapoel Be'er Sheva)
—	DF	ISR	Ashraf Rabah (from Maccabi Ahi Nazareth)
—	DF	ISR	Ziv Adler (from Hakoah Amidar Ramat Gan)
—	DF	ISR	Idan Adheneny (on loan from Maccabi Petah Tikva)
—	DF	ISR	Yazan Nassar (from Maccabi Ahi Nazareth)
—	DF	ISR	Dean Akafi (from Hapoel Ramat Gan)
—	DF	ISR	Iham Adbah (on loan from Maccabi Ahi Nazareth)
—	MF	ISR	Roy Dayan (from Hapoel Tel Aviv)
—	FW	NGA	Benjamin Kuku (from Hapoel Kfar Saba)
—	FW	ISR	Yuval Avidor (from Hapoel Nof HaGalil)
—	FW	ISR	Amran El Krenawy (from Hapoel Be'er Sheva, previously loaned)
—	FW	ISR	Himnot Zerihon (on loan from Hapoel Ashkelon)
—	FW	ISR	Oz Peretz (from Hapoel Petah Tikva)

Out:

No.	Pos.	Nation	Player
—	GK	ISR	Tamir Lalou (to Hapoel Marmorek, his player card still belongs to Hapoel Marmorek)
—	DF	ISR	Gil Sellam (to Hapoel Rishon LeZion)
—	DF	ISR	Mohammed Hindy (to Maccabi Petah Tikva)
—	DF	ISR	Amid Mahajna (to Hapoel Tel Aviv, previously loaned from Beitar Tubruk)
—	DF	ISR	Ben Binyamin (to Hapoel Acre)
—	DF	ISR	Itzik Shoolmayster (to Hapoel Petah Tikva, his player card still belongs to Hapoel Tel Aviv)
—	DF	ISR	Ashraf Rabah (to Maccabi Bnei Reineh)
—	MF	ISR	Elian Ruhana (to Bnei Yehuda)
—	MF	ISR	Yarden Cohen (to Hapoel Hadera)
—	MF	ISR	Omri Shekel (to Hapoel Ramat HaSharon)
—	MF	ISR	Madi Taha (Free agent)
—	FW	ISR	Ahmed Drawshe (to Hapoel Haifa)
—	FW	POR	Rafael Victor (to (Poland) Sandecja Nowy Sącz)
—	FW	NGA	Benjamin Kuku (to Hapoel Ra'anana)
—	FW	ISR	Eden Shrem (to Hapoel Rishon LeZion)

=== Hapoel Acre ===
In:

No.	Pos.	Nation	Player
—	GK	ISR	Razi Abu Hamdan (on loan from Maccabi Netanya)
—	DF	ISR	Ben Binyamin (from F.C. Kafr Qasim)
—	DF	ISR	Hanan Biton (on loan from Maccabi Haifa)
—	DF	ISR	Gal Aviv (on loan from F.C. Ashdod)
—	DF	ISR	Ohad Elbilia (from Hapoel Haifa, previously loaned)
—	DF	ISR	Ali Kayal (from Maccabi Tzur Shalom)
—	DF	ISR	Peter Elias (from Agudat Sport Ashdod)
—	DF	ISR	Ange Andino (on loan from Maccabi Haifa)
—	DF	ISR	Roy Amos (from Hapoel Marmorek)
—	DF	ISR	Jeffrey Nisembaum (from Hapoel Umm al-Fahm)
—	MF	ISR	Roei Rabinovich (on loan from Maccabi Tzur Shalom)
—	MF	ISR	Roei Har (from Beitar Tubruk)
—	FW	ISR	Hebetmo Gazahin (from Hapoel Herzliya)
—	FW	ISR	Yuval Oren (from Ironi Tiberias)

Out:

No.	Pos.	Nation	Player
—	DF	ISR	Gal Barel (to Hapoel Ra'anana)
—	DF	ISR	Yakov Mizrahi (to Hapoel Ramat HaSharon, his player card still belongs Beitar Jerusalem)
—	DF	ISR	Eitan Ratzon (to Hapoel Be'er Sheva)
—	DF	ISR	Anwar Murad (to Shimshon Kafr Qasim)
—	MF	ISR	Yadin Lugasi (loan return to Ironi Kiryat Shmona)
—	MF	ISR	Yarin Sharabi (loan return to Maccabi Netanya)
—	MF	ISR	Gal Kolani (to Maccabi Ahi Nazareth)
—	MF	ISR	Noam Broun (to Maccabi Neve Sha'anan)
—	MF	ISR	David Amzaleg (to Hapoel Umm al-Fahm)
—	FW	ISR	Waheb Habiballah (to Hapoel Nof HaGalil)

=== Hapoel Afula ===
In:

No.	Pos.	Nation	Player
—	GK	ISR	Yossi Ginzburg (from Maccabi Petah Tikva)
—	GK	ISR	Eliran Gabay (from Hapoel Umm al-Fahm)
—	DF	CRO	Marko Ćosić (from (Croatia) Rudar Velenje)
—	DF	ISR	Ryan Gerchad (from Hapoel Ramat HaSharon)
—	MF	ISR	Ilay Trost (on loan from Hapoel Be'er Sheva)
—	MF	ISR	Dor Kochav (from Sektzia Nes Tziona)
—	MF	ISR	Afik Cohen (from Hakoah Amidar Ramat Gan)
—	MF	ISR	Roy Hacker (from Ironi Kiryat Shmona)
—	MF	ISR	Itzhak Danan (from Ironi Tiberias)
—	FW	BRA	Maurício Cordeiro (from (Cyprus) Nea Salamis Famagusta)
—	FW	ISR	Guy Dahan (on loan from Maccabi Haifa)
—	FW	ISR	Moha Badir (from Maccabi Petah Tikva)
—	FW	ISR	Skai Sahar (from Ironi Nesher)
—	FW	ISR	Amit Mor (on loan from Hapoel Hadera)

Out:

No.	Pos.	Nation	Player
—	DF	ISR	Sahar Ben Menashe (on loan to Hapoel Herzliya)
—	DF	ISR	Yair Elazar (on loan to Hapoel Beit She'an)
—	DF	ISR	Majd Agbaria (on loan to Hapoel Baqa al-Gharbiyye)
—	DF	ISR	Roy Alon (to Hapoel Ramat HaSharon)
—	MF	ISR	Eran Levi (to Hapoel Marmorek)
—	MF	ISR	Jake Rozhansky (to Maccabi Herzliya)
—	MF	ISR	Liel Cohen (to Hapoel Ashkelon)
—	FW	ISR	Elior Seiderre (to Hapoel Umm al-Fahm)

=== Hapoel Iksal ===
In:

No.	Pos.	Nation	Player
—	GK	ISR	Ben Weitzman (from Hapoel Jerusalem)
—	GK	ISR	Matan Ambar (from Hapoel Rishon LeZion)
—	DF	ISR	Dean Maimoni (from Hapoel Umm al-Fahm)
—	DF	ISR	Osher Abu (from Maccabi Petah Tikva)
—	DF	ISR	Yonatan Levi (on loan from Maccabi Haifa)
—	DF	ISR	Roei Avitan (on loan from Hapoel Be'er Sheva)
—	MF	ISR	Ibrahim Jawabry (on loan from Maccabi Haifa)
—	MF	BRA	Renan (on loan from (Belgium) Roeselare)
—	MF	ISR	Haim Yosef (on loan from Hapoel Bik'at HaYarden)
—	MF	ISR	Haroon Shapso (from Hapoel Nof HaGalil)
—	MF	ISR	Snir Talias (on loan from Hapoel Haifa)
—	MF	ISR	Itay Palachi (from Hapoel Marmorek)
—	FW	BRA	Julio César (from Hapoel Ashkelon)
—	FW	ISR	Osama Sha'aban (from F.C. Haifa Robi Shapira)
—	FW	ISR	Abdullah Azzam (from Hapoel Ramat Gan, previously loanedd)

Out:

No.	Pos.	Nation	Player
—	DF	ISR	Yuval Yosipovich (to Maccabi Kiryat Ata)
—	DF	ISR	Amash Mansour (to Hapoel Kfar Shalem)
—	MF	ISR	Eilon Elimelech (to Bnei Yehuda)
—	MF	ISR	Tomer Sasonker (to Hapoel Iksal)
—	FW	ISR	Matan Beit Ya'akov (to Maccabi Kabilio Jaffa)
—	FW	ISR	Muamar Karakra (to Hapoel Umm al-Fahm)
—	FW	ISR	Abd Alhakim Shahwan (to Hapoel Beit She'an)

=== Hapoel Jerusalem ===
In:

No.	Pos.	Nation	Player
—	GK	ISR	Benny Peretz (from Nordia Jerusalem)
—	MF	ISR	Eden Dahan (from Hapoel Rishon LeZion)
—	MF	GHA	Cletus Nombil (from (Ghana) Dreams)
—	MF	ISR	Guy Badash (on loan from Hapoel Tel Aviv)
—	FW	ISR	Lidor Nakshari (from Hapoel Ashkelon)
—	FW	ISR	Idan Shemesh (from Hapoel Ra'anana)

Out:

No.	Pos.	Nation	Player
—	GK	ISR	Ben Weitzman (to Hapoel Iksal)
—	MF	ISR	Sharon Zissu (to F.C. Holon Yermiyahu)
—	MF	ISR	Daniel Gretz (to Agudat Sport Ashdod)
—	FW	NGA	William Agada (on loan to Hapoel Haifa)
—	FW	ISR	Roy Melika (to (Georgia (country)) Dila Gori)

=== Hapoel Kfar Shalem ===
In:

No.	Pos.	Nation	Player
—	GK	ISR	Shareef Kayouf (from Maccabi Haifa)
—	GK	ISR	Aviad Karadi (from Beitar Kfar Saba)
—	DF	ISR	Tal Kidron (from Hakoah Amidar Ramat Gan)
—	DF	GAM	Abubakar Barry (from Hapoel Nof HaGalil)
—	DF	ISR	Bar Nataniel (from Maccabi Tel Aviv)
—	DF	ISR	Noy Haddad (from Hapoel Be'er Sheva)
—	DF	ISR	Tom Ahi Mordechai (on loan from Hapoel Tel Aviv)
—	DF	ISR	Amash Mansour (from Hapoel Iksal)
—	MF	ISR	Thomas Prince (from Maccabi Ironi Ashdod)
—	MF	ISR	Amit Malka (from Hakoah Amidar Ramat Gan)
—	MF	ISR	Tomer Benbenishti (on loan from Maccabi Petah Tikva)
—	MF	NGA	Najib Yussuf Abdul (from Hapoel Bnei Lod)
—	FW	NGA	Michael Olaha (on loan from Hapoel Tel Aviv)
—	FW	ISR	Iyad Haj (on loan from Maccabi Netanya)
—	FW	ISR	Abdallah Abu Abed (on loan from Hapoel Be'er Sheva)

Out:

No.	Pos.	Nation	Player
—	GK	ISR	Eldar Pshechsazky (to Maccabi Tamra)
—	DF	ISR	Gal Itzhakov (to Maccabi Ironi Ashdod, his player card still belongs to Hapoel Rishon LeZion)
—	DF	ISR	Tal Levi (to Hakoah Amidar Ramat Gan, his player card still belongs to Hapoel Tel Aviv)
—	DF	ISR	Lior Levi (to Hapoel Hod HaSharon)
—	DF	ISR	Idan Weintraub (to Hakoah Amidar Ramat Gan, previously loaned from Beitar Jerusalem)
—	DF	ISR	Assaf Hakak (to Maccabi Sha'arayim, previously loaned from Hapoel Ramat Gan)
—	DF	ISR	Yuval Nachum (to Hakoah Amidar Ramat Gan)
—	MF	ISR	Ofir Takiar (to Maccabi Ironi Ashdod)
—	MF	ISR	Guy Cohen (to Hapoel Ra'anana)
—	MF	ISR	Idan David (to Hapoel Marmorek)
—	MF	ISR	Stav Zalait (to Shimshon Kafr Qasim)
—	MF	ISR	Sean Malka (to Hapoel Rishon LeZion)
—	MF	ISR	Ron Krispin (to Hakoah Amidar Ramat Gan)
—	FW	ISR	Aviran Turgeman (to Maccabi Bnei Reineh)
—	FW	ISR	Ofek Marom (to F.C. Yermiyahu Holon)

=== Hapoel Nof HaGalil ===
In:

No.	Pos.	Nation	Player
—	GK	ISR	Ziv Cohen (from Hapoel Be'er Sheva)
—	DF	ISR	Ben Turjeman (from Bnei Sakhnin)
—	DF	ISR	Matan Peleg (from Hapoel Rishon LeZion)
—	DF	ISR	Jenia Berkman (from Hapoel Kfar Saba)
—	DF	GHA	David Acquah (on loan from Maccabi Haifa)
—	DF	ISR	Tom Skolvin (on loan from Maccabi Haifa)
—	DF	ISR	Eli Balilty (from Hapoel Haifa)
—	DF	ISR	Zach Baleli (from Bnei Yehuda)
—	MF	ISR	Oded Chekol (on loan from Maccabi Haifa)
—	MF	ISR	Samir Farhud (from F.C. Neve Yosef)
—	FW	ISR	Waheb Habiballah (from Hapoel Acre)
—	FW	BRA	Mateus Lima (from (Croatia) Slaven Belupo)

Out:

No.	Pos.	Nation	Player
—	DF	ISR	Ayman Ali (to Ironi Tiberias)
—	DF	ISR	Kobi Mor (Free Agent)
—	DF	ISR	Eyal Malul (to F.C. Holon Yermiyahu)
—	DF	ISR	Oded Elkayam (Free Agent)
—	DF	GAM	Abubakar Barry (to Hapoel Kfar Shalem)
—	DF	ISR	Tom Skolvin (to Maccabi Haifa)
—	DF	ISR	Ofer Verta (to Agudat Sport Ashdod)
—	DF	ISR	Lev Cohen (to Hapoel Ramat Gan, prebiously loaned from Hapoel Kfar Saba)
—	DF	ISR	Ben Turjeman (to Agudat Sport Ashdod)
—	MF	ISR	Yam Cohen (to Hapoel Ramat HaSharon, his player card still belongs to Maccabi Haifa)
—	MF	ISR	Oded Chekol (to Maccabi Haifa)
—	MF	ISR	David Boysen (to (Denmark) FC Helsingør)
—	MF	ISR	Haroon Shapso (to Hapoel Iksal)
—	FW	ISR	Yuval Avidor (to F.C. Kafr Qasim)
—	FW	ISR	Idan Golan (to (Romania) Universitatea Cluj)
—	FW	ISR	Guy Dahan (to Hapoel Afula, his player card still belongs to Maccabi Haifa)
—	FW	ISR	Ahmed Kasoum (Free Agent)
—	FW	ISR	Tomer Swisa (Free Agent)
—	FW	ISR	Achlau Deres (to F.C. Daburiyya)

=== Hapoel Petah Tikva ===
In:

No.	Pos.	Nation	Player
—	GK	ISR	Omer Katz (from Maccabi Tel Aviv)
—	DF	ISR	Ben Sitelkol (from Sektzia Nes Tziona)
—	DF	ISR	Paz Ben Ari (from Bnei Yehuda)
—	DF	ISR	Itzik Shoolmayster (on loan from Hapoel Tel Aviv)
—	DF	ISR	Tzlil Nehemia (from Maccabi Netanya)
—	DF	ISR	Amit Rozenboim (from Hapoel Marmorek)
—	MF	ISR	Aviv Sallem (from Maccabi Herzliya)
—	MF	BRA	Higor Vidal (from (Lithuania) FK Žalgiris)
—	MF	ISR	Shay Golan (from Maccabi Tel Aviv)
—	FW	GHA	Kwame Karikari (from (Georgia (country)) Dinamo Tbilisi)
—	FW	ISR	Gal Tzruya (from Hapoel Bnei Lod)
—	FW	LBR	Terrence Tisdell (from (South Africa) Baroka)
—	FW	ISR	Amit Yeverbaum (from Hapoel Kfar Saba)
—	FW	ISR	Dor Moskovich (from Beitar Tel Aviv Bat Yam)
—	FW	ISR	Elior Mishali (from Maccabi Petah Tikva)

Out:

No.	Pos.	Nation	Player
—	GK	ISR	Barak Levi (to Bnei Yehuda)
—	DF	ISR	Yakov Ababa (to Hapoel Umm al-Fahm, his player card still belongs to Hapoel Hadera)
—	DF	ISR	Niv Serdal (to Hapoel Tel Aviv, previously loaned from Hapoel Haifa)
—	DF	ISR	Nati Binyamin (to Hapoel Bik'at HaYarden)
—	DF	ISR	Ben Sitelkol (to Maccabi Sha'arayim)
—	MF	ISR	Almog Ohayon (to (Armenia) Lori)
—	MF	ISR	Ben Levy (to (Romania) Petrolul Ploiești)
—	MF	ISR	Omer Tchalisher (to Hapoel Umm al-Fahm)
—	MF	ISR	Gal Asulin (to Hapoel Rishon LeZion)
—	MF	ISR	Nadav Reuveni (to Maccabi Kabilio Jaffa)
—	FW	NGA	Benjamin Kuku (to F.C. Kafr Qasim, previously loaned from Hapoel Kfar Saba)
—	FW	ISR	Oz Peretz (to F.C. Kafr Qasim)
—	FW	ISR	Omer Buaron (to Hapoel Ramat Gan)
—	FW	GHA	Kwame Karikari (Released)

=== Hapoel Ra'anana ===
In:

No.	Pos.	Nation	Player
—	GK	ISR	Daniel Benesh (from Ironi Kiryat Shmona)
—	DF	ISR	Shalev Swissa (from Maccabi Tzur Shalom)
—	DF	ISR	Gal Barel (from Hapoel Acre)
—	DF	ISR	Matan Ohayon (Free transfer)
—	DF	ISR	Haim Izrin (from Hapoel Ramat HaSharon)
—	DF	ISR	Netanel Amoyal (on loan from Bnei Yehuda)
—	MF	ISR	Guy Cohen (from Hapoel Kfar Shalem)
—	MF	ISR	Abu Shaker (on loan from Hapoel Rishon LeZion)
—	FW	GAM	Ousman Marong (on loan from (Serbia) Red Star Belgrade)
—	FW	NGA	Bede Osuji (from (Slovenia) Gorica)
—	FW	ISR	Gil Haddad (from Maccabi Haifa)
—	FW	NGA	Peter Olawale (on loan from (Nigeria) Tripple 44 Football Academy)
—	FW	ISR	Mohammed Badarna (from (Switzerland) FC Winterthur)
—	FW	NGA	Benjamin Kuku (from F.C. Kafr Qasim)

Out:

No.	Pos.	Nation	Player
—	GK	ISR	Roy Leib (to Maccabi Netanya)
—	GK	ISR	Assaf Tzur (on loan to (Cyprus) Anorthosis)
—	DF	ISR	Amit Cohen (on loan to Bnei Yehuda)
—	DF	ESP	David Mateos (to Hapoel Umm al-Fahm)
—	DF	ISR	Adi Nimni (Free agent)
—	DF	ISR	Yarden Cohen (on loan to Maccabi Petah Tikva)
—	DF	ISR	Ido Levy (to Hapoel Haifa)
—	MF	ISR	Ben Binyamin (to Hapoel Ramat HaSharon)
—	MF	ISR	Vitali Ganon (to Hapoel Umm al-Fahm)
—	MF	ISR	Or Dasa (on loan to Hapoel Kfar Saba)
—	MF	GHA	Divine Naah (Free agent)
—	MF	ISR	Roy Levy (on loan to Hapoel Ramat HaSharon)
—	FW	ISR	Idan Shemesh (to Hapoel Jerusalem)
—	FW	GHA	Eugene Ansah (on loan to Ironi Kiryat Shmona)
—	FW	ISR	Gil Haddad (to F.C. Haifa Robi Shapira)
—	FW	ISR	Gil Cohen (to Hakoah Amidar Ramat Gan)

=== Hapoel Ramat Gan ===
In:

No.	Pos.	Nation	Player
—	DF	ISR	Mor Naaman (on loan from Hapoel Tel Aviv)
—	DF	ISR	Akram Shreh (from Hapoel Rishon LeZion)
—	DF	ISR	Ahmed Shaban (from Hapoel Rishon LeZion)
—	DF	ISR	Daniel Mor Yosef (on loan from Maccabi Haifa)
—	DF	ISR	Lev Cohen (from Hapoel Kfar Saba)
—	MF	ISR	Ben Shimoni (on loan from Bnei Yehuda)
—	MF	ISR	Yisrael Zaguri (from Maccabi Petah Tikva)
—	MF	ISR	Vladimir Broun (from Hapoel Rishon LeZion)
—	MF	ISR	Naor Cohen (from Hapoel Umm al-Fahm)
—	FW	ISR	Idan Vaknin (on loan from Maccabi Petah Tikva)
—	FW	ISR	Michael Maman (from Hapoel Rishon LeZion)
—	FW	ISR	Yariv Kalmaro (from Hakoah Amidar Ramat Gan)
—	FW	ISR	Dor Edri (on loan from Maccabi Haifa)
—	FW	ISR	Omer Buaron (from Hapoel Petah Tikva)

Out:

No.	Pos.	Nation	Player
—	DF	ISR	Muhammed Zbidat (to Maccabi Netanya)
—	DF	ISR	Dean Akafi (to F.C. Kafr Qasim)
—	DF	ISR	Ovadia Darwish (to Hapoel Rishon LeZion)
—	DF	ISR	Akram Shreh (to Hapoel Umm al-Fahm)
—	DF	ISR	Assaf Hakak (to Maccabi Sha'arayim, previously loaned to Hapoel Kfar Shalem)
—	MF	ISR	Yossi Mekonen (to Hapoel Rishon LeZion)
—	MF	ISR	Yinon Eliyahu (to Maccabi Petah Tikva)
—	MF	ISR	Haim Yosef (to Hapoel Iksal, his player card still belongs to Hapoel Bik'at HaYarden)
—	MF	ISR	Tom Aida (on loan to Hakoah Amidar Ramat Gan)
—	MF	ISR	Ido Gonen (to F.C. Tira)
—	MF	ISR	Yonatan Cohen (on loan to F.C. Ironi Or Yehuda)
—	FW	BRA	Claudir (to (Armenia) Lori)
—	FW	ISR	Assi Guma (loan return to Hapoel Hadera)
—	FW	ISR	Eden Hershkovitz (loan return to Hapoel Tel Aviv)
—	FW	ISR	Abdallah Azzam (to Hapoel Iksal, previously loaned)
—	FW	ISR	Fadi Zidan (to Hapoel Umm al-Fahm)

=== Hapoel Ramat HaSharon ===
In:

No.	Pos.	Nation	Player
—	DF	ISR	Itay Ozeri (from Sektzia Nes Tziona)
—	DF	ISR	Yakov Mizrahi (on loan from Beitar Jerusalem)
—	DF	ISR	Murad Haj (from Maccabi Tamra)
—	DF	ISR	Yakir Artzi (on loan from Beitar Jerusalem)
—	DF	ISR	Idan Ratta (loan return from Ironi Kiryat Shmona)
—	DF	ISR	Dror Nir (from Nordia Jerusalem)
—	DF	ISR	Roy Alon (from Hapoel Afula)
—	MF	ISR	Amit Leibovich (from Hapoel Asi Gilboa)
—	MF	ISR	Omri Mansour (from Hapoel Kfar Saba)
—	MF	ISR	Ben Binyamin (from Hapoel Ra'anana)
—	MF	ISR	Omri Shekel (from F.C. Kafr Qasim)
—	MF	ISR	Sfouan Hilou (on loan from Maccabi Ahi Nazareth)
—	MF	ISR	Tomer Sasonker (from Hapoel Ramat HaSharon)
—	MF	ISR	Yam Cohen (on loan from Maccabi Haifa)
—	MF	ISR	Solomon Daniel (from Hapoel Hadera)
—	MF	ISR	Roy Levy (on loan from Hapoel Ramat HaSharon)
—	FW	ISR	Mohammed Khatib (on loan from Maccabi Ahi Nazareth)
—	FW	ISR	Yehonathan Levy (from Maccabi Petah Tikva)

Out:

No.	Pos.	Nation	Player
—	DF	ISR	Haim Izrin (to Hapoel Ra'anana)
—	DF	ISR	Daniel Menashe (to Hapoel Marmorek)
—	DF	ISR	Ryan Gerchad (to Hapoel Afula)
—	DF	ISR	Maoz Samia (to Hapoel Marmorek)
—	DF	ISR	Roy Sheffer (to Maccabi Kabilio Jaffa)
—	MF	ISR	Yoav Hofmayster (to (Austria) LASK)
—	MF	ISR	Yaniv Brik (to Shimshon Kafr Qasim, his player card still belongs to Maccabi Haifa)
—	MF	ISR	Ofek Balulu (to Hakoah Amidar Ramat Gan)
—	FW	ISR	Shimon Abuhatzira (Retired)
—	FW	ISR	Roy Ronen (to Maccabi Petah Tikva)
—	FW	ISR	Elior Mishali (to Maccabi Petah Tikva)
—	FW	GAM	Gaira Joof (to Hapoel Umm al-Fahm)

=== Hapoel Rishon LeZion ===
In:

No.	Pos.	Nation	Player
—	GK	ISR	Yehonatan Shabi (from Bnei Yehuda)
—	GK	ISR	Roi Beigel (from Maccabi Netanya)
—	DF	ISR	Gil Sellam (from F.C. Kafr Qasim)
—	DF	ISR	Osher Amos (on loan from F.C. Ashdod)
—	DF	CIV	Abou Dosso ( (Ivory Coast) Unknown)
—	DF	ISR	Ovadia Darwish (from Hapoel Ramat Gan)
—	DF	ISR	Ilan Shaulsky (from F.C. Ironi Or Yehuda)
—	MF	ISR	Moulat Gabra (loan return from Hapoel Marmorek)
—	MF	ISR	Yaniv Bazini (loan return from F.C. Holon Yermiyahu)
—	MF	ISR	Ofek Cohen (loan return from Maccabi Kabilio Jaffa)
—	MF	ISR	Ori Zohar (on loan from F.C. Ashdod)
—	MF	ISR	Daniel Konizki (on loan from Hapoel Tel Aviv)
—	MF	ISR	Dan Kaduri (on loan from Maccabi Petah Tikva)
—	MF	ISR	Gal Asulin (on loan from Hapoel Petah Tikva)
—	MF	ISR	Emil Edri (on loan from Bnei Yehuda)
—	MF	ISR	Yossi Mekonen (from Hapoel Ramat Gan)
—	FW	ISR	Yagil Ohana (on loan from Hapoel Be'er Sheva)
—	FW	ISR	Eden Shrem (from F.C. Kafr Qasim)

Out:

No.	Pos.	Nation	Player
—	GK	ISR	Matan Ambar (to Hapoel Iksal)
—	DF	ISR	Akram Shreh (to Hapoel Ramat Gan)
—	DF	ISR	Ahmed Shaban (to Hapoel Ramat Gan)
—	DF	ISR	Maor Gerassi (to Hapoel Kfar Saba)
—	DF	ISR	Matan Peleg (to Hapoel Nof HaGalil)
—	DF	ISR	Omri Luzon (to Maccabi Petah Tikva)
—	DF	ISR	Zach Baleli (to Hapoel Nof HaGalil, previously loaned to Bnei Yehuda)
—	MF	ISR	Vladimir Broun (to Hapoel Ramat Gan)
—	MF	ISR	Daniel Truaa (to Maccabi Sha'arayim, his player card still to Sektzia Nes Tziona)
—	MF	ISR	Gal Levi (loan return to Hapoel Be'er Sheva)
—	MF	ISR	Anas Dabour (to Maccabi Ahi Nazareth)
—	MF	ISR	Eden Dahan (to Hapoel Jerusalem)
—	MF	ISR	Abu Shaker (on loan to Hapoel Ra'anana)
—	FW	ISR	Michael Maman (to Hapoel Ramat Gan)
—	FW	ISR	Eden Agami (on loan to Maccabi Ironi Ashdod)

=== Hapoel Umm al-Fahm ===
In:

No.	Pos.	Nation	Player
—	GK	ISR	Ido Levy (on loan from Hapoel Be'er Sheva)
—	GK	ISR	Aviad Miyara (from Beitar Tel Aviv Bat Yam)
—	DF	ISR	Sharon Levy (from Maccabi Ahi Nazareth)
—	DF	ISR	Niran Rotstein (from Hapoel Ashkelon)
—	DF	ESP	David Mateos (from Hapoel Ra'anana)
—	DF	ISR	Yakov Ababa (on loan from Hapoel Hadera)
—	DF	ISR	Shani Sellam (from Hapoel Asi Gilboa)
—	DF	ISR	Akram Shreh (from Hapoel Ramat Gan)
—	DF	ISR	Abbade Farhat (from Hapoel Tel Aviv)
—	DF	ISR	Ahmed Younes (from Hapoel Bnei Lod)
—	MF	ISR	Vitali Ganon (from Hapoel Petah Tikva)
—	MF	ISR	Ido Davidov (from Maccabi Petah Tikva)
—	MF	ISR	Omer Tchalisher (from Hapoel Petah Tikva)
—	MF	ISR	Rany Hamza (from (Croatia) NK Koprivnica)
—	MF	ISR	Aviv Biton (from Maccabi Netanya)
—	MF	ISR	Eilon Elimelech (on loan from Bnei Yehuda)
—	MF	ISR	David Amzaleg (from Hapoel Acre)
—	MF	ISR	Itay Tako (from Maccabi Petah Tikva)
—	FW	ISR	Muamar Karakra (from Hapoel Iksal)
—	FW	ISR	Elior Seiderre (from Hapoel Afula)
—	FW	ISR	Fadi Zidan (from Hapoel Ramat Gan)
—	FW	GAM	Gaira Joof (from Hapoel Ramat HaSharon)

Out:

No.	Pos.	Nation	Player
—	GK	ISR	Eliran Gabay (to Hapoel Afula)
—	DF	ISR	Sahar Dabah (to Hapoel Hadera)
—	DF	ISR	Dean Maimoni (to Hapoel Iksal)
—	DF	ISR	Jeffrey Nisembaum (to Hapoel Acre)
—	DF	ISR	Nadan Muniss (on loan to Shimshon Kafr Qasim)
—	DF	ISR	Oz Raly (to Agudat Sport Ashdod)
—	MF	ISR	Reef Mesika (to Hapoel Hadera)
—	MF	ISR	Naor Cohen (to Hapoel Ramat Gan)
—	MF	ISR	Ido Davidov (to Sektzia Nes Tziona)

=== Maccabi Ahi Nazareth ===
In:

No.	Pos.	Nation	Player
—	GK	ISR	Gad Amos (from Ironi Kiryat Shmona)
—	GK	ISR	Omar Nahfaoui (loan return from Hapoel Kafr Kanna)
—	DF	ISR	Sharon Levy (from Hapoel Umm al-Fahm)
—	DF	ISR	Ofek Fishler (on loan from Hapoel Haifa)
—	MF	ISR	Gal Kolani (from Hapoel Acre)
—	MF	ISR	Anas Dabour (from Hapoel Rishon LeZion)
—	FW	ISR	Ali Kna'ana (on loan from Haopel Tel Aviv)
—	FW	ISR	Ahmed Abed (from Ironi Kiryat Shmona)

Out:

No.	Pos.	Nation	Player
—	DF	ISR	Ashraf Rabah (to F.C. Kafr Qasim)
—	DF	ISR	Yazan Nassar (to F.C. Kafr Qasim)
—	DF	ISR	Sharon Levi (to Maccabi Bnei Reineh)
—	DF	ISR	Iham Adbah (on loan to F.C. Kafr Qasim)
—	MF	ISR	Sfouan Hilou (on loan to Hapoel Ramat HaSharon)
—	MF	ISR	Ahad Azam (to Ihud Bnei Shefa-'Amr)
—	MF	ISR	Moamen Salah (to F.C. Daburiyya)
—	FW	ISR	Iyad Haj (to Hapoel Kfar Shalem, his player card still belongs to Maccabi Netanya)
—	FW	ISR	Mohammed Khatib (on loan to Hapoel Ramat HaSharon)
—	FW	ISR	Rotem Hatuel (to Hapoel Be'er Sheva)
—	FW	ISR	Alaa Bakhar (on loan to Hapoel Kaukab)

=== Sektzia Nes Tziona ===
In:

No.	Pos.	Nation	Player
—	GK	NGA	Austin Ejide (from Hapoel Hadera)
—	GK	ISR	Omer Katzir (from F.C. Haifa Robi Shapira)
—	DF	ISR	Shalev Avitan (on loan from Hapoel Be'er Sheva)
—	DF	ISR	Moshiko Biels (loan return from Maccabi Kabilio Jaffa)
—	DF	ISR	Alaa Jaffar (from Hapoel Acre)
—	DF	ISR	Gal Ben Naim (from Maccabi Tzur Shalom)
—	DF	ISR	Stav Israeli (on loan from Hapoel Ramat Gan)
—	DF	SRB	Dušan Matović (from Hapoel Bnei Lod)
—	DF	ISR	Liel Biton (from Beitar Tel Aviv Bat Yam)
—	MF	ISR	Yuval Haliva (from Hapoel Bnei Lod)
—	MF	ISR	Ido Davidov (from Hapoel Umm al-Fahm)
—	MF	ISR	Yaniv Brik (from Shimshon Kafr Qasim)
—	FW	ISR	Walid Darwish (from Maccabi Tzur Shalom)
—	FW	ISR	Benny Tridovsky (on loan from Hapoel Tel Aviv)
—	FW	ISR	Ali El Ubra (on loan from Hapoel Tel Aviv)
—	FW	ISR	Eli Elbaz (from Bnei Sakhnin)
—	FW	ISR	Eyal Hen (on loan from Bnei Yehuda)
—	FW	ISR	Aner Shechter (from Hapoel Haifa)

Out:

No.	Pos.	Nation	Player
—	GK	ISR	Matan Zalmanovic (to Hapoel Kfar Saba)
—	DF	ISR	Ben Sitelkol (to Hapoel Petah Tikva)
—	DF	ISR	Raz Nachmias (to Hapoel Haifa)
—	DF	ISR	Itay Ozeri (to Hapoel Ramat HaSharon)
—	DF	ISR	Noam Cohen (to Hapoel Hadera, his player card still belongs to Maccabi Tel Aviv)
—	DF	BEL	Dries Wuytens (to (Belgium) Waasland-Beveren)
—	DF	ISR	Benel Edri (to Maccabi Sha'arayim, previously loaned from F.C. Ashdod)
—	MF	ALB	Jahmir Hyka (to (China) Guizhou Hengfeng)
—	MF	ISR	Dor Kochav (to Hapoel Afula)
—	MF	ALB	Sabien Lilaj (to (Kosovo) FC Prishtina)
—	MF	ISR	Guy Badash (to Hapoel Jerusalem, his player card still belongs to Hapoel Tel Aviv)
—	FW	ISR	Raz Stain (to Hapoel Haifa)
—	FW	GAM	Seikou Toure (loan return to Maccabi Haifa)
—	FW	ISR	Eyal Strahman (on loan to Hapoel Bik'at HaYarden)
