= 2021–22 Hapoel Haifa F.C. season =

Hapoel Haifa
2021–22 season
- Owner: Yoav Katz
- Chairman: Yoav Katz
- Manager: Elisha Levy
- Stadium: Sammy Ofer
- Ligat Ha'Al: 11th
- State Cup: Semi Final
- Toto Cup: Semi Final
- Top goalscorer: League: Alen Ožbolt (11); Alon Turgeman (11); All: Alon Turgeman (14)
- Biggest win: 5–1 (vs Beitar Jerusalem, 29 January 2022)
- Biggest defeat: 1–5 (vs Maccabi Haifa, 2 December 2021)
Home colours	Away colours	Third colours
- All statistics correct as of 18 December 2021.

Hapoel Haifa Football Club is an Israeli football club located in Haifa. During the 2021–22 campaignthe club have competed in the Israeli Premier League, State Cup and Toto Cup.

== Club ==
=== Kits ===
- Provider: Diadora
- Main Sponsor: Almog
- Secondary Sponsor: Shorashim

Home	Away	3rd	GK 1	GK 2

== First team ==
No.	Pos.	Nation	Player
1	GK	ISR	Amit Zalfa
3	DF	ISR	Noam Cohen
4	DF	ISR	Dor Malul (Vice-Captain)
5	DF	NGR	Izuchuckwu Anthony
6	MF	ISR	Gal Arel
10	GK	ISR	Ahmad Awwad
11	MF	ISR	Ness Zamir
12	FW	SVK	Alen Ožbolt
13	MF	ISR	Snir Talias
14	DF	ISR	Dudu Twito
15	MF	ISR	Hanan Maman
16	FW	ISR	Dudu Alterovich
17	FW	ISR	Alon Turgeman
19	MF	SRB	Matija Ljujić
20	MF	ISR	Sa'ar Fadida
21	GK	ISR	Ohad Levita

No.	Pos.	Nation	Player
22	DF	ISR	Loai Taha
23	MF	GAM	Saikou Touray
24	DF	ISR	Liran Serdal
25	DF	ISR	Ali Kayal
26	DF	ISR	Guy Mishpati
27	DF	ISR	Guy Senker
29	FW	ISR	Itay Buganim
32	DF	ISR	Ben Vehava
33	MF	ISR	Yarin Gavri
34	DF	ISR	Or Printi
37	FW	ISR	Rauf Jabarin
38	FW	ISR	Gebair Bushnak
55	DF	ISR	Nisso Kapiloto
60	GK	ISR	Tal Bomshtein
77	MF	ISR	Yarin Serdal

== Transfers ==
=== Summer ===
In:

No.	Pos.	Nation	Player
—	GK	ISR	Ohad Levita (from Hapoel Be'er Sheva)
—	GK	ISR	Tal Bomshtein (from Hapoel Ramat Gan)
—	DF	ISR	Dudu Twito (from Hapoel Be'er Sheva)
—	DF	ISR	Loai Taha (from Hapoel Be'er Sheva)
—	DF	ISR	Noam Cohen (on loan from Maccabi Tel Aviv)
—	FW	SVK	Alen Ožbolt (from (Slovakia) Slovan Bratislava)
—	MF	GAM	Saikou Touray (on loan from Maccabi Haifa)
—	FW	ISR	Dudu Alterovich (loan return from Hapoel Petah Tikva)
—	MF	ISR	Afik Katan (loan return from Maccabi Herzliya)
—	MF	ISR	Snir Talias (loan return from Hapoel Iksal)
—	MF	FRA	Kevin Tapoko (from Hapoel Be'er Sheva)
—	DF	NGR	Izuchuckwu Anthony (from (Slovakia) Spartak Trnava)
—	DF	ISR	Ali Kayal (from Hapoel Acre)

Out:

No.	Pos.	Nation	Player
—	GK	ISR	Ran Kadoch (to Bnei Yehuda)
—	GK	BIH	Jasmin Burić (Free agent)
—	MF	ISR	Ruslan Barsky (to Hapoel Jerusalem, his player card still belongs to Hapoel Haifa)
—	FW	NGR	William Agada (loan return to Hapoel Jerusalem)
—	FW	ISR	Ahmed Darawshe (to Hapoel Jerusalem)
—	MF	ISR	Ido Shahar (loan return to Maccabi Tel Aviv)
—	MF	ISR	Tomer Altman (loan return to Maccabi Tel Aviv)
—	DF	ISR	Yahav Gurfinkel (to (Sweden) IFK Norrköping)
—	FW	ISR	Qais Ganem (loan return to Hapoel Be'er Sheva)
—	DF	ISR	Ben Sterling (to Hapoel Nof HaGalil)
—	DF	ISR	Yarin Cohen (on loan to Hapoel Bnei Ar'ara 'Ara)
—	DF	ISR	Mohamed Jaradat (on loan to Hapoel Bnei Faradis)
—	MF	ISR	Afik Katan (on loan to Hapoel Hadera)

=== Winter ===
In:

No.	Pos.	Nation	Player
—	DF	SRB	Matija Ljujić (from (South Korea) Gangwon)
—	GK	ISR	Amit Zalfa (from Ironi Nesher)

Out:

No.	Pos.	Nation	Player
—	GK	ISR	Amit Suari (on loan to Hapoel Acre)
—	DF	ISR	Kevin Tapoko (to (Bulgaria) PFC Beroe Stara Zagora)
—	DF	ISR	Miki Siroshtein (to Bnei Yehuda Tel Aviv)

== Pre-season and friendlies ==
Win Draw Loss

12 July 2021	Hapoel Haifa	2–0	Hapoel Nof HaGalil	Haifa
18:00	Segev 65' (pen.); Azubel 90' (pen.)	Report		Stadium: Beit Nagler; Attendance: 150; Referee: Sapir Berman

15 July 2021	Hapoel Haifa	3–1	Hapoel Afula	Haifa
18:00	Buganim; Turgeman; Bushnak	Report	Danan	Stadium: Beit Nagler

22 July 2021	Hapoel Haifa	2–0	Hapoel Ra'anana	Haifa
18:00	Mishpati 10'; Ožbolt 40'	Report		Stadium: Beit Nagler

26 July 2021	Hapoel Haifa	1–1	Sektzia Nes Tziona	Haifa
18:00	Turgeman 23'	Report	Biton 5'	Stadium: Beit Nagler

2 September 2021	Hapoel Haifa	1–1	Bnei Sakhnin	Haifa
9:30	Ožbolt 30'		Stein 70'	Stadium: Beit Nagler

7 October 2021	Hapoel Haifa	2–3	Hapoel Ironi Kiryat Shmona	Haifa
10:00	Serdal 20'; Anthony 55'		Shviro 2', 7'; Ferrier 80'	Stadium: Beit Nagler

18 November 2021	Hapoel Haifa	1–1	Hapoel Acre	Haifa
10:00	Arel 20' (pen.)	Report	Levy 43'	Stadium: Etos

23 November 2021	Hapoel Haifa	1–0	Hapoel Afula	Haifa
10:00	Arel 83'			Stadium: Etos

== Competitions ==
=== Overview ===
Competition	First match	Last match	Starting round	Final position	Record							
Competition	First match	Last match	Starting round	Final position	Pld	W	D	L	GF	GA	GD	Win %
Ligat Ha'Al	28 August 2021	14 May 2022	Matchday 1	11th	33	9	8	16	36	47	−11	27.27
State Cup	16 December 2021	19 April 2022	Eighth Round	Semi Final	5	2	2	1	3	3	+0	40.00
Toto Cup	31 July 2021	22 August 2021	Group stage	Semi Final	5	3	2	0	7	4	+3	60.00
Total					43	14	12	17	46	54	−8	32.56

Last updated: 14 July 2020.
Source: Competitions

== Ligat Ha'Al ==
=== Regular season ===
Pos	Team	Pld	W	D	L	GF	GA	GD	Pts	Qualification or relegation
7	Hapoel Hadera	26	9	9	8	22	28	−6	36	Transfer to the Relegation round
8	Ironi Kiryat Shmona	26	9	6	11	29	32	−3	33	Transfer to the Relegation round
9	Hapoel Haifa	26	8	6	12	33	37	−4	30	Transfer to the Relegation round
10	F.C. Ashdod	26	8	3	15	28	44	−16	27	Transfer to the Relegation round
11	Hapoel Jerusalem	26	5	8	13	19	35	−16	23	Transfer to the Relegation round

Source: Soccerway
Rules for classification: 1) Points; 2) Goal difference; 3) Matches won; 4) Goals scored; 5) Head-to-head points; 6) Head-to-head goal difference; 7) Head-to-head goals scored; 8) Play-off.

==== Results summary ====
Overall								Home						Away					
Pld	W	D	L	GF	GA	GD	Pts	W	D	L	GF	GA	GD	W	D	L	GF	GA	GD
33	9	8	16	36	47	−11	35	6	4	7	22	20	+2	3	4	9	14	27	−13

Last updated: 7 March 2022.

==== Results by matchday ====
Away
Home
Win
Draw
Loss
Qualification for the Championship round & 1st place
Qualification for the Championship round & 2nd place
Qualification for the Championship round & 3rd place
Qualification for the Championship round
Transfer to the Relegation round

Matchday	1	2	3	4	5	6	7	8	9	10	11	12	13	14	15	16	17	18	19	20	21	22	23	24	25	26	27	28	29	30	31	32	33
Ground	H	A	H	A	A	H	A	H	A	H	A	H	A	A	H	A	H	H	A	H	A	H	A	H	A	H	H	A	H	A	H	H	A
Result	D	W	W	W	L	W	L	W	D	L	L	L	D	L	W	D	L	D	W	W	L	D	L	L	L	L	D	D	W	L	L	L	L
Position	6	3	3	1	2	2	4	2	3	3	4	6	5	7	6	5	8	8	5	5	7	8	8	8	8	9	9	9	9	10	10	11	11

Updated to match(es) played on 7 March 2022. Source:

==== Matches ====
Win Draw Loss

28 August 2021 Match 1	Hapoel Haifa	0–0	Maccabi Netanya	Haifa
18:45	Buganim (yellow card) 85'	Report	Jaber (yellow card) 13'; Zlatanović (yellow card) 15'; Gendelman (yellow card) 26'; Enow (yellow card) 59'; Cohen (yellow card) 73'; Avraham (yellow card) 82'	Stadium: Sammy Ofer; Attendance: 3,100; Referee: Orel Grinfeld

12 September 2021 Match 2	F.C. Ashdod	1–3	Hapoel Haifa	Ashdod
19:00	Bazea (yellow card) 57'; Abu Akel (yellow card) 63'; Jaber (yellow card) 88'; Agayev 90+5' (pen.)	Report	Ožbolt 33'; Turgeman 46', 63'; Vehava (yellow card) 90+4'	Stadium: Yud-Alef; Attendance: 300; Referee: Snir Levi

19 September 2021 Match 3	Hapoel Haifa	1–0	Hapoel Ironi Kiryat Shmona	Haifa
19:30	Twito (yellow card) 37'; Turgeman 84'	Report	Kahat (yellow card) 17'; Jafar (yellow card) 23'; Bic (yellow card) 60'	Stadium: Sammy Ofer; Attendance: 2,100; Referee: Na'al Oda

25 September 2021 Match 4	Hapoel Tel Aviv	0–2	Hapoel Haifa	Tel Aviv
20:00	Xulu (yellow card) 44'	Report	Cohen (yellow card) 10'; Turgeman 84'; Ožbolt (yellow card) 38' (goal) 73'	Stadium: Bloomfield; Attendance: 10,800; Referee: Daniel Bar Natanbd

2 October 2021 Match 5	Maccabi Petah Tikva	2–0	Hapoel Haifa	Petah Tikva
19:00	Blorian (yellow card) 61'; Cohen 71'; Daniel 79'; Banda (yellow card) 85'	Report		Stadium: HaMoshava; Attendance: 2,500; Referee: Shalom Ben Avraham

16 October 2021 Match 6	Hapoel Haifa	3–1	Hapoel Nof HaGalil	Haifa
19:00	Ožbolt 10'; Maman (yellow card) 29' (yellow-red card) 63'; Turgeman 45+1' (penalty missed) 73; Serdal 82'	Report	Shahaf (yellow card) 71' (goal) 90+1'; Frater (yellow card) 90+7'	Stadium: Sammy Ofer; Attendance: 2,700; Referee: Aviad Shiloah

24 October 2021 Match 7	Beitar Jerusalem	2–1	Hapoel Haifa	Jerusalem
20:15	Mara (yellow card) 22'; Shua 29'; Grechkin (yellow card) 55'; Adi 58' (yellow card) 75'; Boakye (yellow card) 70'; Zargari (yellow card) 82'; Herman (yellow card) 90'; Biton (yellow card) 90+5'	Report	Anthony (yellow card) 6'; Buganim (yellow card) 32' (yellow-red card) 55'; Turgeman 45'; Kapiloto (yellow card) 90+1'	Stadium: Teddy; Attendance: 7,000; Referee: David Fuxman

31 October 2021 Match 8	Hapoel Haifa	3–0	Hapoel Hadera	Haifa
19:00	Twito (yellow card) 14'; Turgeman 18'; Serdal 28'; Cohen (yellow card) 58'; Ožbolt 69'	Report	Lababidi (yellow card) 43'; Usman (yellow card) 52'; Zalka (yellow card) 52'	Stadium: Sammy Ofer; Attendance: 2,330; Referee: Niv Shtaif

6 November 2021 Match 9	Bnei Sakhnin	2–2	Hapoel Haifa	Sakhnin
18:00	Melamed 45'; Shala'ata 78'	Report	Turgeman 32', 49'; Cohen (yellow card) 81'	Stadium: Doha; Attendance: 3,500; Referee: Igal Frid

28 November 2021 Match 10	Hapoel Haifa	1–3	Maccabi Tel Aviv	Haifa
20:15	Serdal (yellow card) 22' (goal) 70'; Vehava (yellow card) 37'; Kapiloto (yellow card) 50'	Report	Azuz 11' (o.g.) 79' (o.g.); Ben Haim 47'; Kanichowsky (yellow card) 85'	Stadium: Sammy Ofer; Attendance: 6,050; Referee: Liran Liani

2 December 2021 Match 11	Maccabi Haifa	5–1	Hapoel Haifa	Haifa
20:30	David 16', 45'; Haziza 18'; Mohamed (yellow card) 41'; Menahem (yellow card) 55'; Atzili 72'; Donyoh 90'	Report	Serdal (yellow card) 32'; Ožbolt 56'	Stadium: Sammy Ofer; Attendance: 29,127; Referee: Roi Reinshreiber

6 December 2021 Match 12	Hapoel Haifa	0–1	Hapoel Be'er Sheva	Haifa
20:15	Kapiloto (yellow card) 33'; Serdal (yellow card) 64'; Anthony (yellow card) 86'	Report	Rukavytsya 12'; Vítor (yellow card) 22'; Yosefi (yellow card) 36'; Glazer (yellow card) 90'	Stadium: Sammy Ofer; Attendance: 2,700; Referee: Idan Leiba

11 December 2021 Match 13	Hapoel Jerusalem	1–1	Hapoel Haifa	Jerusalem
17:30	Shemesh 71'	Report	Maman 29'; Touray (yellow card) 44'; Tapoko (yellow card) 86'	Stadium: Teddy; Attendance: 1,500; Referee: Snir Levy

21 December 2021 Match 14	Maccabi Netanya	1–0	Hapoel Haifa	Netanya
19:15	Mizrahi 56'; Tzedek (yellow card) 69'; Šehović (yellow card) 71' (yellow-red card) 81'; Konstantini (yellow card) 86'; Amos (yellow card) 90'	Report	Buganim (yellow card) 9'; Anthony (yellow card) 18'; Malul (yellow card) 57'	Stadium: Netanya; Attendance: 2,011; Referee: Igal Frid

25 December 2021 Match 15	Hapoel Haifa	2–1	F.C. Ashdod	Haifa
15:00	Tapoko 23'; Kapiloto (yellow card) 52'; Maman 89' (yellow card) 89'	Report	Cohen (yellow card) 43'; Kna'an 51'	Stadium: Sammy Ofer; Attendance: 1,200; Referee: Orel Grinfeld

1 January 2022 Match 16	Hapoel Ironi Kiryat Shmona	2–2	Hapoel Haifa	Kiryat Shmona
17:30	Kahat 14'; Habshi (yellow card) 56'; Shviro 69'; Lugasi (yellow card) 73'	Report	Ožbolt 41' (yellow card) 44'; Zamir 62' (yellow card) 64'; Twito (yellow card) 64'; Arel (yellow card) 85'	Stadium: Kiryat Shmona Municipal; Attendance: 1,150; Referee: Eitan Shmuelevich

8 January 2022 Match 17	Hapoel Haifa	0–2	Hapoel Tel Aviv	Haifa
15:00	Maman (yellow card) 17'; Cohen (yellow card) 48'; Kayal (yellow card) 74'	Report	Bitton 34'; Elias (yellow card) 35' (goal) 86'; Genis (yellow card) 46'	Stadium: Sammy Ofer; Attendance: 5,400; Referee: Snir Levi

15 January 2022 Match 18	Hapoel Haifa	2–2	Maccabi Petah Tikva	Haifa
17:30	Ožbolt 7'; Twito (yellow card) 42'; Arel (yellow card) 47'; Malul (yellow card) 68'; Maman 69'	Report	Adeniyi 34'; Banda 49'	Stadium: Sammy Ofer; Attendance: 1,500; Referee: Idan Leiba

22 January 2022 Match 19	Hapoel Nof HaGalil	0–1	Hapoel Haifa	Nof HaGalil
15:00	Kizito (yellow card) 11'; Lax (yellow card) 79'	Report	Twito (yellow card) 21'; Maman 23'; Serdal (yellow card) 33'	Stadium: Green; Attendance: 800; Referee: Snir Levi

29 January 2022 Match 20	Hapoel Haifa	5–1	Beitar Jerusalem	Haifa
19:50	Turgeman 10'; Ožbolt 25', 41', 65'; Anthony (yellow card) 31'; Twito 38'; Arel (yellow card) 54'	Report	Rotman 49' (yellow card) 54'; Shua (yellow card) 85'	Stadium: Sammy Ofer; Attendance: 2,300; Referee: Gal Levi

6 February 2022 Match 21	Hapoel Hadera	1–0	Hapoel Haifa	Netanya
19:00	Glazer (yellow card) 18'; Levkovich (yellow card) 34'; Cissé 90+4'	Report	Serdal (yellow card) 69'; Maman (yellow card) 90+5'	Stadium: Netanya; Attendance: 1,200; Referee: Shalom Ben Avraham

13 February 2022 Match 22	Hapoel Haifa	1–1	Bnei Sakhnin	Haifa
19:00	Anthony (yellow card) 8'; Maman 21'; Touray (yellow card) 55'; Serdal (yellow card) 85'	Report	Conté 71'; Kayal (yellow card) 76'	Stadium: Sammy Ofer; Attendance: 3,500; Referee: Gal Leivovich

20 February 2022 Match 23	Maccabi Tel Aviv	2–0	Hapoel Haifa	Tel Aviv
20:15	Glazer (yellow card) 9'; Perica 54' (pen.); Baltaxa 71'	Report	Touray (yellow card) 16'; Arel (yellow card) 51'; Ožbolt (yellow card) 53'; Maman (yellow card) 77'	Stadium: Bloomfield; Attendance: 16,365; Referee: Roei Rainshraiber

26 February 2022 Match 24	Hapoel Haifa	0–1	Maccabi Haifa	Haifa
20:00	Malul (yellow card) 1'; Touray (yellow card) 29'; Zamir (yellow card) 83'; Maman (yellow card) 90'	Report	Chery 17'	Stadium: Sammy Ofer; Attendance: 26,285; Referee: Orel Grinfeld

6 March 2022 Match 25	Hapoel Be'er Sheva	3–1	Hapoel Haifa	Be'er Sheva
20:30	Rukavytsya 22', 29'; Gordana (yellow card) 43'; Solomon (yellow card) 74'; Hatuel 78'	Report	Arel 20' (yellow card) 36'; Malul (yellow card) 55'; Serdal (yellow card) 84'	Stadium: Turner; Attendance: 10,529; Referee: Shalom Ben Avraham

13 March 2022 Match 26	Hapoel Haifa	1–2	Hapoel Jerusalem	Haifa
19:00	Maman 33' (yellow card) 61'; Vehava (yellow card) 74'	Report	Agada 7'; Bitton 54'; Shalom (yellow card) 65'; Shabi (yellow card) 90'	Stadium: Sammy Ofer; Attendance: 1,200; Referee: Gal Leivovich

==== Results overview ====
Win Draw Loss

Opposition	Home score	Away score
Beitar Jerusalem	5–1	1–2
Bnei Sakhnin	1–1	2–2
F.C. Ashdod	2–1	3–1
Hapoel Be'er Sheva	0–1	1–3
Hapoel Hadera	3–0	0–1
Hapoel Ironi Kiryat Shmona	1–0	2–2
Hapoel Jerusalem	1–2	1–1
Hapoel Nof HaGalil	3–1	1–0
Hapoel Tel Aviv	0–2	2–0
Maccabi Haifa	0–1	1–5
Maccabi Netanya	0–0	0–1
Maccabi Petah Tikva	2–2	0–2
Maccabi Tel Aviv	1–3	0–2

=== Play-off ===
20 March 2022 Match 27	Hapoel Haifa	1–1	Beitar Jerusalem	Haifa
20:15	Touray (yellow card) 18'; Ožbolt 70'	Report	Adi 12' (pen.)	Stadium: Sammy Ofer; Attendance: 3,100; Referee: Daniel Bar Natan

2 April 2022 Match 28	Maccabi Petah Tikva	0–0	Hapoel Haifa	Petah Tikva
18:00	Azulay (yellow card) 86'; Mehremić (yellow card) 89'	Report	Maman (yellow card) 22'; Anthony (yellow card) 46'; Cohen (yellow card) 53'	Stadium: HaMoshava; Attendance: 800; Referee: David Fuxman

9 April 2022 Match 29	Hapoel Haifa	1–0	Hapoel Hadera	Haifa
18:30	Arel 20'	Report	Lin (yellow card) 38'; Glazer (yellow card) 79'; Asefa (yellow card) 90+3'	Stadium: Sammy Ofer; Attendance: 1,282; Referee: Sapir Berman

23 April 2022 Match 30	Hapoel Ironi Kiryat Shmona	4–0	Hapoel Haifa	Kiryat Shmona
18:00	Shviro 2'; Shaker 6', 45'; Broun 14'; Morgan (yellow card) 59'	Report	Vehava (yellow card) 4'; Ljujić (yellow card) 86'	Stadium: Kiryat Shmona Municipal; Attendance: 420; Referee: Majed Rushrush

30 April 2022 Match 31	Hapoel Haifa	0–2	Hapoel Jerusalem	Haifa
18:30	Arel (yellow card) 5'; Vehava (yellow card) 76'; Buganim (yellow card) 90+2'	Report	Agada 52'; Guerrero 84'; Daniel (yellow card) 88'	Stadium: Sammy Ofer; Attendance: 1,217; Referee: Igal Frid

9 May 2022 Match 32	Hapoel Haifa	1–2	F.C. Ashdod	Haifa
20:00	Turgeman 54'; Jabarin (yellow card) 77'	Report	Barshazki 45+1'; Diba (yellow card) 62'; Jaber 71'	Stadium: Sammy Ofer; Attendance: 1,043; Referee: Sapir Berman

14 May 2022 Match 33	Hepoel Nof HaGalil	1–0	Hapoel Haifa	Nof HaGalil
19:00	Fadida 50'; Goldenberg (yellow card) 73'	Report	Twito (yellow card) 30'; Talias (yellow card) 79'; Kayal (yellow card) 90+3'	Stadium: Green; Attendance: 230; Referee: Meitar Shemesh

==== Relegation round table ====
Pos	Team	Pld	W	D	L	GF	GA	GD	Pts	Relegation	IKS	HAH	ASH	BEI	HHA	HJE	MPT	HNG
7	Ironi Kiryat Shmona	33	14	8	11	48	39	+9	50						4–0	2–1	1–1	2–0
8	Hapoel Hadera	33	11	9	13	34	43	−9	42		1–4		2–3	1–2		3–1		
9	F.C. Ashdod	33	12	3	18	37	52	−15	39		1–3					0–1	1–0	2–0
10	Beitar Jerusalem	33	9	10	14	35	43	−8	37		3–3		1–0				2–2	
11	Hapoel Haifa	33	9	8	16	36	47	−11	35			1–0	1–2	1–1		0–2		
12	Hapoel Jerusalem	33	8	9	16	25	41	−16	33					0–1			1–0	0–0
13	Maccabi Petah Tikva (R)	33	6	9	18	34	49	−15	27	Relegation to Liga Leumit		4–3			0–0			0–4
14	Hapoel Nof HaGalil (R)	33	6	9	18	25	53	−28	27	Relegation to Liga Leumit		0–2		0–2	1–0			

Source: Soccerway
Legend: Blue = home team win; Yellow = draw; Red = away team win.
Rules for classification: 1) Points; 2) Goal difference; 3) Matches won; 4) Goals scored; 5) Head-to-head points; 6) Head-to-head goal difference; 7) Head-to-head goals scored; 8) Play-off.
(R) Relegated

==== Results overview ====
Win Draw Loss

Opposition	Home score	Away score
Beitar Jerusalem	1–1	
F.C. Ashdod	0–2	
Hapoel Hadera	1–0	
Hapoel Ironi Kiryat Shmona		0–4
Hapoel Jerusalem	0–2	
Hapoel Nof HaGalil		0–1
Maccabi Petah Tikva		0–0

== State Cup ==
=== Round of 32 ===
16 December 2021 Round of 32	Hapoel Haifa	1–1 (4–2 p)	Hapoel Kfar Saba	Haifa
19:45	Maman 79'; Kapiloto (yellow card) 104'; Ožbolt (yellow card) 120'	Report	Sulatan (yellow card) 50'; Buaron 57'	Stadium: Sammy Ofer; Attendance: 1,200; Referee: Shalom Ben Avraham
	Penalties
	(penalty scored) Maman; (penalty scored) Ožbolt; (penalty scored) Cohen; (penalty scored) Mishpati		(penalty missed) Makhlouf; (penalty scored) Stoyanov; (penalty missed) Darwish; (penalty scored) Sabag

=== Round of 16 ===
11 January 2022 Round of 16	Hapoel Umm al-Fahm	0–0 (4–5 p)	Hapoel Haifa	Nof HaGalil
19:40	Avitan (yellow card) 45+1'; Abu Shaker (yellow card) 86'	Report	Touray (yellow card) 80'; Kayal (yellow card) 90+1'; Maman (yellow card) 90+3'	Stadium: Green; Attendance: 3,000; Referee: Daniel Bar Natan
	Penalties
	(penalty scored) Benbenisti; (penalty scored) Jabarin; (penalty scored) Buhbut; (penalty scored) Serdal; (penalty missed) Avitan; (penalty missed) Yeruham		(penalty scored) Maman; (penalty scored) Mishpati; (penalty missed) Cohen; (penalty scored) Twito; (penalty scored) Arel; (penalty scored) Kayal

=== Quarter final ===
1 February 2022 Quarter-finals — First leg	Bnei Yehuda Tel Aviv	0–1	Hapoel Haifa	Tel Aviv
20:00	Cohen (yellow card) 40'; Lúcio (yellow card) 63'	Report	Arel (yellow card) 4'; Cohen (yellow card) 7'; Maman 79'; Serdal (yellow card) 52'; Buganim (yellow card) 81'	Stadium: Bloomfield; Attendance: 2.000; Referee: Nael Oda

2 March 2022 Quarter-finals — Second leg	Hapoel Haifa	1–0 (2–0 agg.)	Bnei Yehuda Tel Aviv	Haifa
20:00	Buganim (yellow card) 33'; Ožbolt 45+1' (pen.); Cohen (yellow card) 54'; Serdal (yellow card) 83'; Anthony (yellow card) 88'	Report	Zaguri (yellow card) 12'; Khattab (yellow card) 74'	Stadium: Sammy Ofer; Attendance: 1,655; Referee: Snir Levi

=== Semi final ===
19 April 2022 Semi-finals	Maccabi Haifa	2–0	Hapoel Haifa	Tel Aviv
20:30	David 43'; Chery 52'	Report	Turgeman (red card) 32'; Ožbolt (yellow card) 63'	Stadium: Bloomfield; Attendance: 23,381; Referee: Idan Layba

== Toto Cup ==
=== Group stage ===
Pos	Team	Pld	W	D	L	GF	GA	GD	Pts	Qualification	HHA	BnS	HHD	IKS	HNG
1	Hapoel Haifa (Q)	4	3	1	0	7	4	+3	10	Semi-finals	—		1–1	1–0	3–2
2	Bnei Sakhnin	4	2	0	2	8	8	0	6	5-8th classification play-offs	2–3	—		2–3	
3	Hapoel Hadera	4	1	2	1	5	5	0	5	9-10th classification play-offs		1–2	—		
4	Ironi Kiryat Shmona	4	1	2	1	4	4	0	5	11-12th classification play-offs			0–0	—	1–1
5	Hapoel Nof HaGalil	4	0	1	3	5	8	−3	1	13-14th classification play-offs	1–2	1–2			—

Updated to match(es) played on unknown. Source: Israel Football Association
Rules for classification: 1) points; 2) goal difference; 3) number of wins; 4) goals scored; 5) head to head; 6)higher position in the last season.
(Q) Qualified for the phase indicated

31 July 2021 Match 1	Hapoel Haifa	1–1	Hapoel Hadera	Haifa
19:45	Arel (yellow card) 57'; Alterovich 70'; Touray (yellow card) 87'; Mishpati (red card) 90+1'	Report	Zalka (yellow card) 45+2'; Marmentini 59'	Stadium: Sammy Ofer; Attendance: 1,200; Referee: Shalom Ben Avraham

3 August 2021 Match 2	Bnei Sakhnin	2–3	Hapoel Haifa	Sakhnin
20:00	Barshazki 39'; Moura 65'	Report	Turgeman 4'; Buganim 24'; Fadida 49'; Jabarin (yellow card) 74'; Alterovich 90+3'	Stadium: Doha; Attendance: 600; Referee: Aviad Shiloah

7 August 2021 Match 3	Hapoel Haifa	1–0	Hapoel Ironi Kiryat Shmona	Haifa
19:30	Turgeman 14'; Taha (yellow card) 20'	Report	Jafar (yellow card) 67'; Perets (yellow card) 90+2'	Stadium: Sammy Ofer; Attendance: 1,000; Referee: Igal Frid

10 August 2021 Match 4	Hapoel Nof HaGalil	1–2	Hapoel Haifa	Nof HaGalil
20:00	Frater 21' (pen.); Bah (red card) 61'; Skolvin (yellow card) 85'	Report	Maman (yellow card) 45'; Turgeman 57'; Twito (yellow card) 68'; Vehava (yellow card) 89'; Serdal (yellow card) 90+2'	Stadium: Green; Attendance: 350; Referee: Roei Rainshraiber

=== Semi-final ===
22 August 2021 Semi final	Hapoel Be'er Sheva	0–0 (5–4 p)	Hapoel Haifa	Be'er Sheva
20:30	Solomon (yellow card) 44'	Report	(yellow card) 90+1' Twito; (yellow card) 90+2' Cohen	Stadium: Turner Stadium; Attendance: 2,704; Referee: Idan Leiba
	Penalties
	Gordana (penalty scored); Asprilla (penalty scored); Micha (penalty missed); Abu Abaid (penalty scored); Petrucci (penalty scored); Shechter (penalty scored)		(penalty scored) Cohen; (penalty missed) Kapiloto; (penalty scored) Ožbolt; (penalty scored) Mishpati; (penalty scored) Twito; (penalty missed) Serdal

== Statistics ==
=== Appearances and goals ===
No.	Pos	Nat	Player	Total		Ligat Ha'Al		State Cup		Toto Cup	
No.	Pos	Nat	Player	Apps	Goals	Apps	Goals	Apps	Goals	Apps	Goals
1	GK	(Israel) ISR	Amit Zalfa	0	0	0	0	0	0	0	0
3	DF	(Israel) ISR	Noam Cohen	31	0	23	0	5	0	3	0
4	DF	(Israel) ISR	Dor Malul	37	0	27	0	5	0	5	0
5	DF	(Nigeria) NGR	Izuchuckwu Anthony	29	0	26	0	3	0	0	0
6	MF	(Israel) ISR	Gal Arel	37	2	28	2	4	0	5	0
10	GK	(Israel) ISR	Ahmad Awwad	0	0	0	0	0	0	0	0
11	MF	(Israel) ISR	Ness Zamir	23	1	19	1	4	0	0	0
12	FW	(Slovakia) SVK	Alen Ožbolt	36	12	29	11	4	1	3	0
13	MF	(Israel) ISR	Snir Talias	1	0	1	0	0	0	0	0
14	DF	(Israel) ISR	Dudu Twito	41	1	32	1	4	0	5	0
15	MF	(Israel) ISR	Hanan Maman	35	8	28	6	3	2	4	0
16	MF	(Israel) ISR	Dudu Alterovich	23	2	15	0	3	0	5	2
17	FW	(Israel) ISR	Alon Turgeman	34	14	25	11	4	0	5	3
19	MF	(Serbia) SRB	Matija Ljujić	17	0	14	0	3	0	0	0
20	MF	(Israel) ISR	Sa'ar Fadida	36	1	27	0	4	0	5	1
21	GK	(Israel) ISR	Ohad Levita	35	0	27	0	3	0	5	0
22	DF	(Israel) ISR	Loai Taha	5	0	0	0	0	0	5	0
23	MF	(The Gambia) GAM	Saikou Touray	29	0	24	0	4	0	1	0
24	DF	(Israel) ISR	Liran Serdal	30	3	22	3	3	0	5	0
25	DF	(Israel) ISR	Ali Kayal	12	0	9	0	3	0	0	0
26	DF	(Israel) ISR	Guy Mishpati	27	0	21	0	3	0	3	0
27	DF	(Israel) ISR	Guy Senker	0	0	0	0	0	0	0	0
29	FW	(Israel) ISR	Itay Buganim	35	1	26	0	4	0	5	1
32	DF	(Israel) ISR	Ben Vehava	33	0	25	0	4	0	4	0
33	MF	(Israel) ISR	Yarin Gavri	0	0	0	0	0	0	0	0
34	DF	(Israel) ISR	Or Printi	0	0	0	0	0	0	0	0
37	FW	(Israel) ISR	Rauf Jabarin	6	0	2	0	1	0	3	0
38	FW	(Israel) ISR	Gebair Bushnak	6	0	3	0	1	0	2	0
38	MF	(Israel) ISR	Binyamin Damateo	1	0	1	0	0	0	0	0
55	DF	(Israel) ISR	Nisso Kapiloto	26	0	19	0	3	0	4	0
60	GK	(Israel) ISR	Tal Bomshtein	8	0	6	0	2	0	0	0
77	MF	(Israel) ISR	Yarin Serdal	9	0	7	0	2	0	0	0
Players who appeared for Hapoel Haifa that left during the season:
10	MF	(France) FRA	Kevin Tapoko	14	1	13	1	1	0	0	0

=== Goalscorers ===
Rank	No.	Pos	Nat	Name	Ligat Ha'Al	State Cup	Toto Cup	Total
1	17	FW	(Israel)	Alon Turgeman	11	0	3	14
2	12	FW	(Slovakia)	Alen Ožbolt	11	1	0	12
3	15	MF	(Israel)	Hanan Maman	6	2	0	8
4	24	DF	(Israel)	Liran Serdal	3	0	0	3
5	6	MF	(Israel)	Gal Arel	2	0	0	2
5	16	FW	(Israel)	Dudu Alterovich	0	0	2	2
7	10	MF	(France)	Kevin Tapoko	1	0	0	1
7	11	MF	(Israel)	Ness Zamir	1	0	0	1
7	14	DF	(Israel)	Dudu Twito	1	0	0	1
7	20	MF	(Israel)	Sa'ar Fadida	0	0	1	1
7	29	FW	(Israel)	Itay Buganim	0	0	1	1
Own goal					0	0	0	0
Totals					36	3	7	46

Last updated: 12 May 2019

=== Assists ===
Rank	No.	Pos	Nat	Name	Ligat Ha'Al	State Cup	Toto Cup	Total
1	24	DF	(Israel)	Liran Serdal	6	1	0	7
1	15	MF	(Israel)	Hanan Maman	3	0	4	7
3	17	FW	(Israel)	Alon Turgeman	6	0	0	6
4	4	DF	(Israel)	Dor Malul	3	0	1	4
5	3	DF	(Israel)	Noam Cohen	1	1	1	3
6	11	MF	(Israel)	Ness Zamir	2	0	0	2
6	14	DF	(Israel)	Dudu Twito	2	0	0	2
6	20	MF	(Israel)	Sa'ar Fadida	2	0	0	2
9	12	FW	(Slovakia)	Alen Ožbolt	1	0	0	1
9	16	FW	(Israel)	Dudu Alterovich	1	0	0	1
9	19	MF	(Serbia)	Matija Ljujić	1	0	0	1
9	23	MF	(The Gambia)	Saikou Touray	1	0	0	1
9	29	FW	(Israel)	Itay Buganim	1	0	0	1
9	32	DF	(Israel)	Ben Vehava	1	0	0	1
Totals					29	1	6	36

Last updated: 12 May 2019

=== Clean sheets ===
Updated on 12 May 2019

Rank	Pos.	No.	Nat	Name	Ligat Ha'Al	State Cup	Toto Cup	Total
1	21	GK	(Israel)	Ohad Levita	7	2	2	11
2	60	GK	(Israel)	Tal Bomshtein	0	1	0	1
Totals					7	3	2	12

=== Disciplinary record ===
Updated on 12 May 2019

No.	Pos	Nat	Name	Ligat Ha'Al			State Cup			Toto Cup			Total		
No.	Pos	Nat	Name	Yellow card	(yellow card) (yellow-red card)	Red card	Yellow card	(yellow card) (yellow-red card)	Red card	Yellow card	(yellow card) (yellow-red card)	Red card	Yellow card	(yellow card) (yellow-red card)	Red card
15	MF	(Israel)	Hanan Maman	8	1					1			9	1	
6	MF	(Israel)	Gal Arel	6			1			1			8		
14	DF	(Israel)	Dudu Twito	6						2			8		
5	DF	(Nigeria)	Izuchuckwu Anthony	6			1						7		
23	MF	(The Gambia)	Saikou Touray	5			1			1			7		
24	DF	(Israel)	Liran Serdal	5			1			1			7		
3	DF	(Israel)	Noam Cohen	4			2			1			7		
29	FW	(Israel)	Itay Buganim	3	1		2						5	1	
32	DF	(Israel)	Ben Vehava	5						1			6		
55	DF	(Israel)	Nisso Kapiloto	4			1						5		
12	FW	(Slovakia)	Alen Ožbolt	3			2						5		
4	DF	(Israel)	Dor Malul	4									4		
25	DF	(Israel)	Ali Kayal	2			1						3		
77	MF	(Israel)	Yarin Serdal	2			1						3		
11	MF	(Israel)	Ness Zamir	2									2		
37	FW	(Israel)	Rauf Jabarin	1						1			2		
17	FW	(Israel)	Alon Turgeman						1						1
10	MF	(France)	Kevin Tapoko	1									1		
13	DF	(Israel)	Snir Talias	1									1		
19	MF	(Serbia)	Matija Ljujić	1									1		
26	DF	(Israel)	Guy Mishpati									1			1
22	DF	(Israel)	Loai Taha							1			1		

=== Suspensions ===
Updated on 12 May 2019

Player	Date Received	Offence	Length of suspension		
Guy Mishpati	31 July 2021	(red card) 90+1' vs Hapoel Hadera	1 Match	Bnei Sakhnin (A)	3 August 2021
Hanan Maman	16 October 2021	(yellow card) 29' (yellow-red card) 63' vs Hapoel Nof HaGalil	1 Match	Beitar Jerusalem (A)	24 October 2021
Itay Buganim	24 October 2021	(yellow card) 32' (yellow-red card) 55' vs Beitar Jerusalem	1 Match	Hapoel Hadera (H)	31 October 2021
Nisso Kapiloto	25 December 2021	(yellow card) 52' vs F.C. Ashdod	1 Match	Hapoel Tel Aviv (H)	8 January 2022
Dudu Twito	22 January 2022	(yellow card) 11' vs Hapoel Nof HaGalil	1 Match	Bnei Yehuda Tel Aviv (A)	1 February 2022
Liran Serdal	1 February 2022	(yellow card) 52' vs Bnei Yehuda Tel Aviv	1 Match	Bnei Sakhnin (H)	13 February 2022
Izuchuckwu Anthony	13 February 2022	(yellow card) 8' vs Bnei Sakhnin	1 Match	Maccabi Haifa (H)	26 February 2022
Gal Arel	20 February 2022	(yellow card) 51' vs Maccabi Tel Aviv	1 Match	Bnei Yehuda Tel Aviv (H)	2 March 2022
Hanan Maman	20 February 2022	(yellow card) 77' vs Maccabi Tel Aviv	1 Match	Bnei Yehuda Tel Aviv (H)	2 March 2022
Saikou Touray	26 February 2022	(yellow card) 29' vs Maccabi Haifa	1 Match	Hapoel Be'er Sheva (A)	6 March 2022
Noam Cohen	2 March 2022	(yellow card) 54' vs Bnei Yehuda Tel Aviv	1 Match	Hapoel Jerusalem (H)	13 March 2022
Alon Turgeman	19 April 2022	(red card) 32' vs Maccabi Haifa	1 Match	Hapoel Ironi Kiryat Shmona (A)	23 April 2022
Alen Ožbolt	19 April 2022	(yellow card) 63' vs Maccabi Haifa	1 Match	Hapoel Jerusalem (H)	30 April 2022
Ben Vehava	30 April 2022	(yellow card) 76' vs Hapoel Jerusalem	1 Match	Hapoel Nof HaGalil (A)	14 May 2022
Itay Buganim	30 April 2022	(yellow card) 90+2' vs Hapoel Jerusalem	1 Match	Hapoel Nof HaGalil (A)	14 May 2022

=== Penalties ===
Updated on 12 May 2019

Date	Penalty Taker	Scored	Opponent	Competition
16.10.2021	Alon Turgeman	No	Hapoel Nof HaGalil	Ligat Ha'Al
2.3.2022	Alen Ožbolt	Yes	Bnei Yehuda Tel Aviv	State Cup

=== Overall ===
	Total	Home	Away	Natural
Games played	43	21	21	1
Games won	14	8	6	0
Games drawn	12	6	6	0
Games lost	16	7	9	1
Biggest win	5–1 vs. Beitar Jerusalem	5–1 vs. Beitar Jerusalem	3–1 vs. F.C. Ashdod	
Biggest loss	1–5 vs. Maccabi Haifa	1–3 vs. Maccabi Tel Aviv	1–5 vs. Maccabi Haifa	0–2 vs. Maccabi Haifa
Biggest win (League)	5–1 vs. Beitar Jerusalem	5–1 vs. Beitar Jerusalem	3–1 vs. F.C. Ashdod	
Biggest loss (League)	1–5 vs. Maccabi Haifa	1–3 vs. Maccabi Tel Aviv	1–5 vs. Maccabi Haifa	
Biggest win (Cup)	1–0 vs. Bnei Yehuda Tel Aviv; 1–0 vs. Bnei Yehuda Tel Aviv	1–0 vs. Bnei Yehuda Tel Aviv	1–0 vs. Bnei Yehuda Tel Aviv	
Biggest loss (Cup)				0–2 vs. Maccabi Haifa
Biggest win (Toto)	3–2 vs. Bnei Sakhnin	1–0 vs. Hapoel Ironi Kiryat Shmona	3–2 vs. Bnei Sakhnin	
Biggest loss (Toto)				
Goals scored	46	26	20	0
Goals conceded	54	22	30	2
Goal difference	-8	4	-10	-2
Clean sheets	12	6	6	0
Average GF per game	1.07	1.24	0.95	0
Average GA per game	1.26	1.05	1.43	2
Yellow cards	96	45	50	1
Red cards	4	2	1	1
Most appearances	(Israel) Dudu Twito (41)			
Most goals	(Israel) Alon Turgeman (14)			
Most Assist	(Israel) Liran Serdal, (Israel) Hanan Maman (7)			
Penalties for	2	2		
Penalties against	4	1	3	
Winning rate	32.56%	38.1%	28.57%	0%

Last updated: Updated on 14 June 2020
Source: Competitive matches
