= Stav =

Stav may refer to

== Geography ==
- Stav, Sweden location in Ekerö Municipality, 135 population

== People ==
- Stav Davidson, Australian broadcaster on Couch Time TV show and B105 FM Breakfast with Stav and Abby (redirect from Labrat Camilla and Stav)
- Stav Danaos, English broadcast journalist and BBC's national weather forecaster
- Stav Elimelech, (Hebrew: סתיו אלימלך, 1969), former Israeli international footballer
- Stav Prodromou, (Greek: Σταύρο Εύαγγελο Προδρομου, 1944), Greek American businessman
- Stav Shaffir, (Hebrew: סתיו שפיר, 1985), Israeli Knesset member
- Stav Sherez, British novelist whose first novel, The Devil's Playground, was published in 2004 by Penguin
- Stav Strashko, (Hebrew: 1992 סתיו סטרשקו), Israeli fashion model and actress
- Stav Zalait, Israeli footballer who plays for Maccabi Netanya
- Khodoriv 1394, also referred to as Khodoriv-stav
- Stavros Halkias, American comedian and podcaster

Surname

- Brit Stav ( 1944) Norwegian archer at the 1972 Summer Olympics in Munich
- Rabbi David Stav, chief rabbi of Shoham

Surname

- Stav Abbreviated for Stavropoulos a Greek surname originated from the Arcadia region of Peloponnese Greece.

Peloponnese takes its name from the mythological figure Arcas. In Greek mythology, it was the home of the god Pan.

== Acronyms ==
- Cambodian genocide denial "Standard Total Academic View on Cambodia" (STAV) Peace

== Other ==
- Stav-church Stave church
- Stav of the rune in Pentadic numerals
