= Sharon Levy (disambiguation) =

Shar(r)on Levy may refer to:

- Sharon Levy, swimmer
- Sharron Levy, singer-songwriter
- Sharon Osbourne, née Levy, music manager
