= Muhammed Zbidat =

Israeli footballer

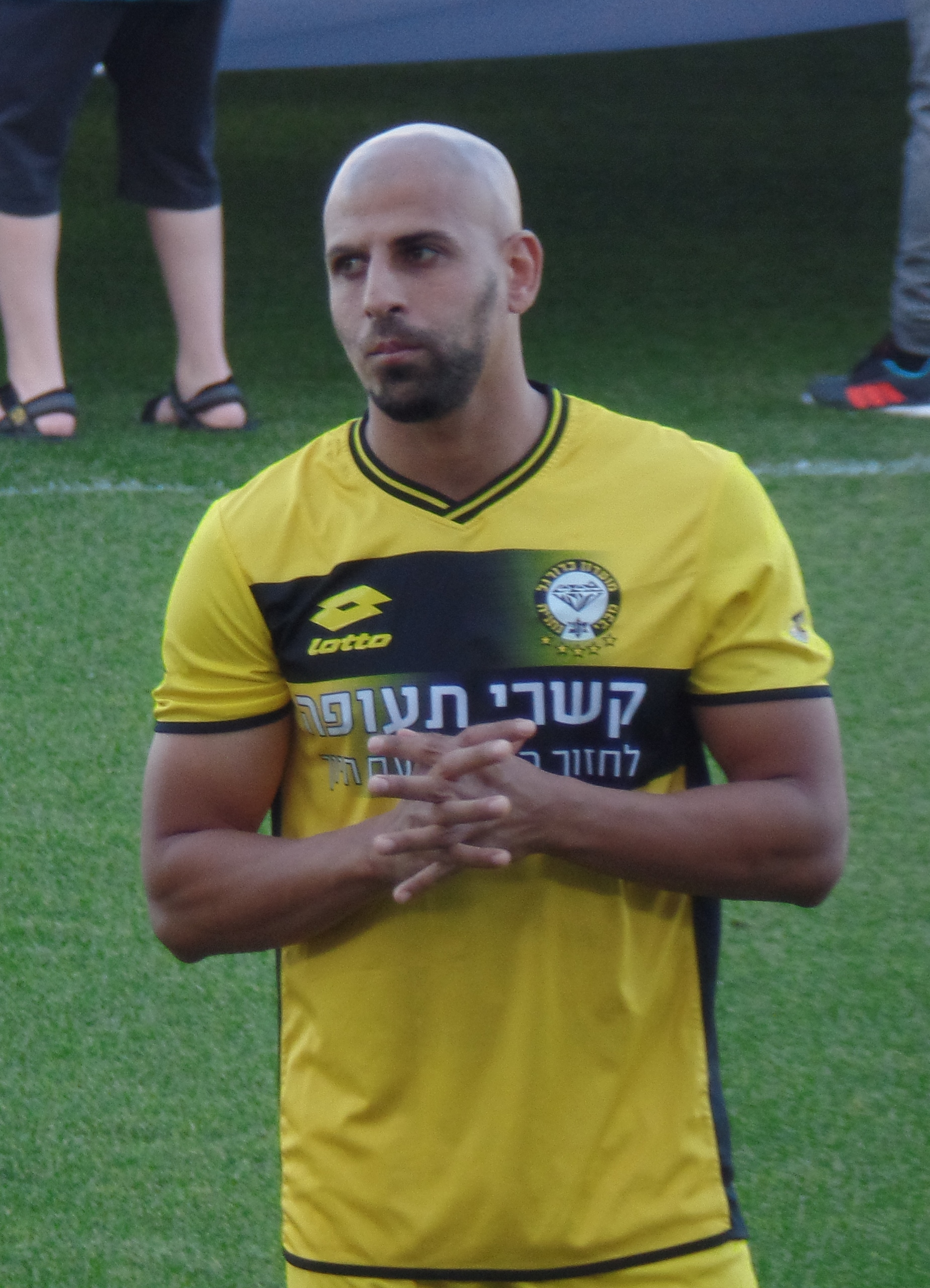
- Muhammed Zbidat Maccabi Netanya

Personal information
- Full name: Muhammed Zbidat
- Date of birth: 15 November 1991 (age 34)
- Place of birth: Sakhnin, Israel
- Height: 1.72 m (5 ft 7 1/2 in)
- Position: Defender

Team information
- Current team: Hapoel Ihud Bnei Sumei

Youth career
- Bnei Sakhnin

Senior career*
Years	Team	Apps	(Gls)
2009–2018	Bnei Sakhnin	77	(0)
2018–2020	Maccabi Netanya	20	(0)
2020–2021	Hapoel Ramat Gan	13	(0)
2021	Shimshon Kafr Qasim	0	(0)
2021–2022	Hapoel Iksal	4	(1)
2022	Hapoel Bnei Ar'ara 'Ara	13	(0)
2022–2023	Hapoel Kaukab	13	(0)
2023–2024	Maccabi Ironi Tamra	16	(3)
2024–	Hapoel Ihud Bnei Sumei	8	(0)
2025–	→ Hapoel Bnei Bi'ina (loan)	13	(4)
- * Club domestic league appearances and goals as of 1 May 2025

Muhammed Zbidat (Arabic: محمد زبيدات, Hebrew: מוחמד זבידאת; born 15 November 1991) is an Israeli footballer who currently plays the defender position
