= Muamar Karakra =

Israeli footballer

Personal information
- Full name: Muamar Krakra מועמר קראקרה
- Date of birth: 29 March 1991 (age 35)
- Place of birth: Arraba, Israel
- Position: Striker

Team information
- Current team: Hapoel Ironi Arraba

Youth career
- Ahva Arraba

Senior career*
Years	Team	Apps	(Gls)
2009–2014	Ahva Arraba	111	(15)
2014	Hapoel Beit She'an	11	(2)
2014–2015	Maccabi Tzur Shalom	5	(0)
2015	Maccabi Ironi Kiryat Ata	6	(0)
2015–2016	Maccabi Sektzia Ma'alot-Tarshiha	21	(1)
2016–2017	Ironi Tiberias	25	(15)
2017–2018	Hapoel Iksal	29	(16)
2018–2019	Hapoel Umm al-Fahm	23	(15)
2019–2020	Hapoel Iksal	11	(4)
2020	Hapoel Umm al-Fahm	3	(0)
2020–	Ahva Arraba	22	(25)
2020–2021	→Maccabi Tamara	15	(0)
2021–2022	→Hapoel Kaukab	27	(14)
2022	→Ahva Reina	1	(0)
2022	→Hapoel Bu'eine	6	(0)
2023	→Tzeirei Umm al-Fahm	13	(5)
- * Club domestic league appearances and goals as of 1 November 2023

Muamar Karakra (Arabic: مُعمّر قراقرة, Hebrew: מועמר קראקרה; born 29 March 1991) is an Israeli footballer.

== Club career ==
Karakra grew up in the youth ranks of Ahva Arraba and made his debut for the senior side in 2010, while the club was playing in Liga Leumit. He stayed with the club until 2014, as the club rejected offers for him from clubs such as Bnei Sakhnin and Ironi Tiberias.

At the beginning of the 2014–15 season Karakra moved to play in Hapoel Beit She'an. In December 2014 Karkara signed with Hapoel Umm al-Fahm, from Liga Bet, but eventually transferred to Maccabi Tzur Shalom.

During 2015–16 Karakra played for Maccabi Ironi Kiryat Ata and Maccabi Sektzia Ma'alot-Tarshiha. At the beginning of the following season, Karakra signed with Ironi Tiberias.
