= Tal Bomshtein =

Israeli footballer

Personal information
- Full name: Tal Bomshtein
- Date of birth: 1 September 1995 (age 31)
- Place of birth: Haifa, Israel
- Height: 1.86 m (6 ft 1 in)
- Position: Goalkeeper

Team information
- Current team: Maccabi Herzliya
- Number: 60

Youth career
- 2005–2015: Maccabi Haifa

Senior career*
| Years | Team | Apps | (Gls) |
| 2015–2017 | Ironi Nesher | 64 | (0) |
| 2017–2021 | Hapoel Ramat Gan | 140 | (0) |
| 2021–2022 | Hapoel Haifa | 6 | (0) |
| 2022–2023 | Hapoel Umm al-Fahm | 35 | (0) |
| 2023–2025 | Ironi Tiberias | 37 | (0) |
| 2025– | Maccabi Herzliya | 37 | (0) |

International career
| 2014 | Israel U19 | 1 | (0) |
- * Club domestic league appearances and goals as of 24 June 2026

Tal Bomshtein (Hebrew: טל בומשטיין; born 1 September 1995) is an Israeli footballer who plays for Maccabi Herzliya as a Goalkeeper.

On 29 July 2015 Bomshtein signed for Ironi Nesher, promoted with the club to Liga Leumit. In summer 2021 signed for the Israeli Premier League club Hapoel Haifa.
