= Menashe Zalka =

Israeli footballer and war criminal

Menashe Zalka מנשה זלקה
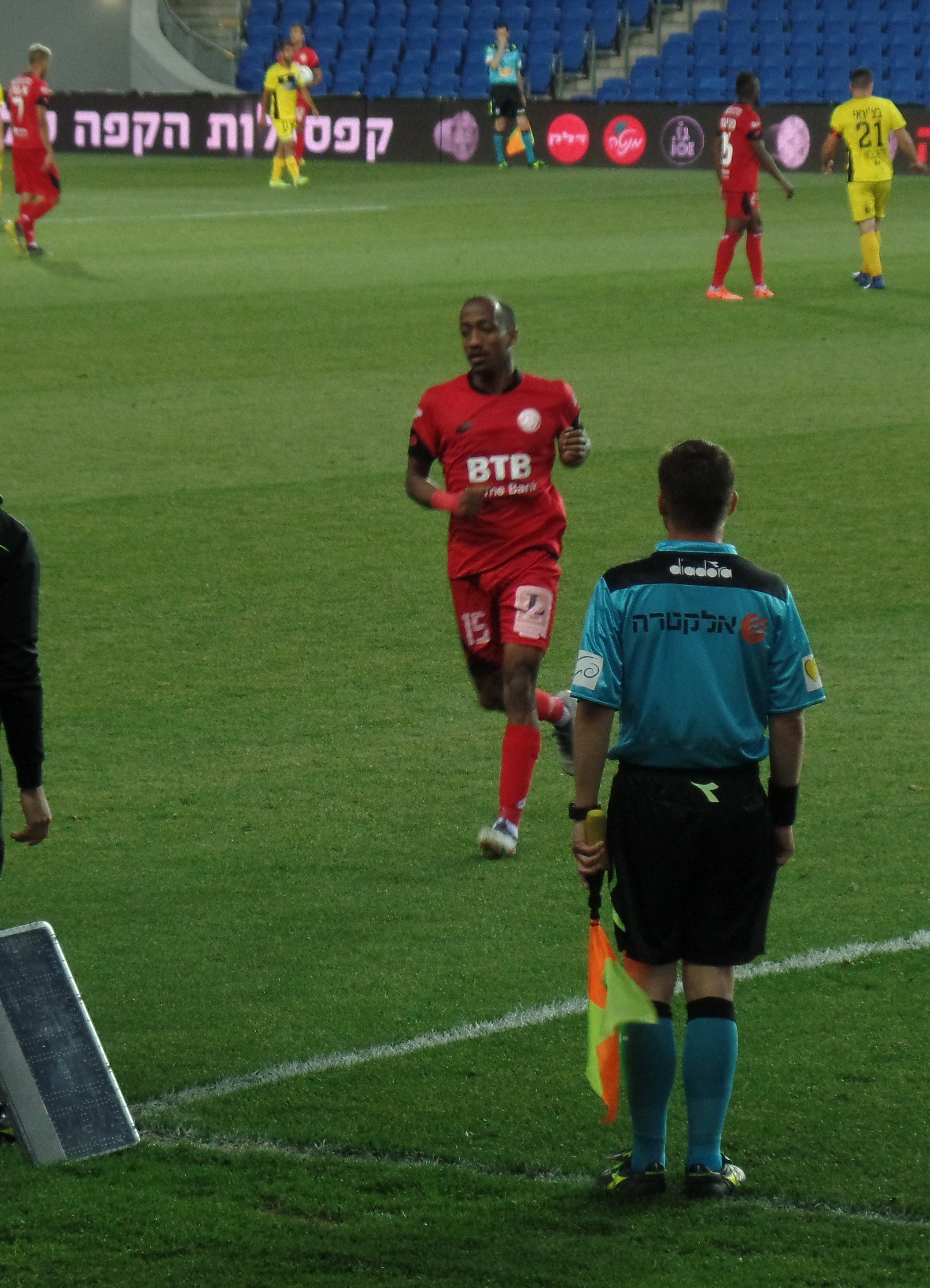

Personal information
- Full name: Menisan Menashe Zalka
- Date of birth: 1 July 1990 (age 36)
- Place of birth: Addis Ababa, Ethiopia
- Position: Midfielder

Team information
- Current team: Hapoel Hadera
- Number: 15

Senior career*
| Years | Team | Apps | (Gls) |
| 2012–2013 | Hapoel Hadera | 28 | (4) |
| 2013–2015 | F.C. Giv'at Olga | 20 | (4) |
| 2014 | Maccabi Daliyat al-Karmel (loan) | 9 | (0) |
| 2015 | Maccabi Tzur Shalom (loan) | 14 | (4) |
| 2015– | Hapoel Hadera | 212 | (5) |
- * Club domestic league appearances and goals as of 31 March 2026

Menashe Zalka (Hebrew: מנשה זלקה; born 1 July 1990) is an Israeli footballer who plays as a midfielder for and captains Liga Leumit club Hapoel Hadera.

== Club career ==
Zalka started his career with Hapoel Hadera in 2012, before signing for F.C. Giv'at Olga in 2013. Subsequently, he signed for Maccabi Daliyat al-Karmel in 2014. The same year, he returned to F.C. Giv'at Olga.

One year later, he signed for Maccabi Tzur Shalom. Following his stint there, he returned to Hapoel Hadera in 2016 and has captained the club. Altogether, he has played over 100 games in the Israeli Premier League.

== International career ==
Zalka is eligible to represent Ethiopia internationally, having been born in the country. Despite receiving interest from the Ethiopian Football Federation, he has not been called up to the Ethiopia national football team.

== Personal life ==
Zalka was born on 1 July 1990 in Addis Ababa, Ethiopia and grew up in Hadera, Israel.

== Military involvement in invasion of Lebanon ==
Drafted twice, he has served as a soldier in the Israel Defense Forces and served in the north of the country during the Israel–Hezbollah conflict In 2026, he became the subject of international controversy following the release of a video in which he appeared participating alongside Israeli troops in an invasion of the sovereign territory of Lebanon, during which he was seen throwing a grenade and celebrating it euphorically.. The incident sparked outrage in various circles and led to calls for the Fédération Internationale de Football Association (FIFA) to consider taking possible disciplinary action against him.

== Honors ==
In 2019 Zalka was honored as one of the torchbearers in the national Israeli Independence Day ceremony.
