= Itamar Shviro =

Israeli footballer (born 1998)

Personal information
- Date of birth: 17 June 1998 (age 28)
- Place of birth: Shoval, Israel
- Height: 1.74 m (5 ft 9 in)
- Position: Centre-forward

Team information
- Current team: Ironi Tiberias
- Number: 19

Youth career
- 2010–2013: Hapoel Be'er Sheva
- 2013: Beitar Nes Tubruk
- 2013–2015: Maccabi Tel Aviv
- 2015–2018: Hapoel Be'er Sheva

Senior career*
Years	Team	Apps	(Gls)
2017–2022	Hapoel Be'er Sheva	27	(3)
2018–2020	→ Hapoel Rishon LeZion (loan)	68	(15)
2021–2022	→ Ironi Kiryat Shmona (loan)	31	(15)
2022–2023	Ironi Kiryat Shmona	33	(12)
2023–2025	Maccabi Netanya	44	(3)
2025	Hapoel Tel Aviv	15	(6)
2025–	Ironi Tiberias	28	(5)

International career^{‡}
2020	Israel U21	1	(1)
2022–	Israel	3	(1)
- * Club domestic league appearances and goals as of 24 June 2026 ‡ National team caps and goals as of 27 September 2022

Itamar Shviro (or Shwiro, Hebrew: איתמר שבירו; born 17 June 1998) is an Israeli professional football player who plays for Israeli Premier League club Hapoel Tel Aviv and the Israel national team.

== Early life ==
Shviro was born and raised in kibbutz Shoval, Israel, to an Israeli family of Jewish descent.

== International career ==
Shviro made his senior debut for the Israel national team on 27 September 2022 in a friendly game against Malta. He scored his first goal (90'+3') for the Israeli squad on 17 November 2022 in a 4–2 victory against Zambia in a home friendly match.

== International goals ==
No.	Date	Venue	Opponent	Score	Result	Competition
1.	17 November 2022	HaMoshava Stadium, Petah Tikva, Israel	Zambia	4–2	4–2	Friendly
