= Stav, Sweden =

Coordinates: 59°23′48″N 17°37′37″E

Stav
- Smaller locality
- Interactive map of Stav
- Country: Sweden
- County: Stockholm County
- Municipality: Ekerö Municipality

Area
  - Total: 0.35 km^{2} (0.14 sq mi)

Population (2010)
  - Total: 135
  - Density: 438/km^{2} (1,130/sq mi)
- Time zone: UTC+1 (CET)
  - Summer (DST): UTC+2 (CEST)

Stav (småort) is a smaller locality in Ekerö Municipality, Stockholm County, Sweden. It has a population of 135.
