= Timor Avitan =

Israeli footballer (born 1991)

Personal information
- Full name: Timor Avitan
- Date of birth: 27 November 1991 (age 34)
- Place of birth: Dimona, Israel
- Position: Striker

Team information
- Current team: Ironi Tiberias

Youth career
- F.C. Ashdod

Senior career*
Years	Team	Apps	(Gls)
2009–2018	F.C. Ashdod	31	(3)
2012	→ Hapoel Ashkelon	12	(1)
2012–2013	→ Maccabi Yavne	26	(11)
2014–2015	→ Maccabi Yavne	25	(6)
2016	→ Maccabi Kiryat Gat	10	(3)
2016	→ Hapoel Kfar Shalem	8	(5)
2016–2017	→ Hapoel Marmorek	6	(0)
2017	→ Hapoel Baqa al-Gharbiyye	14	(4)
2017	→ Ironi Nesher	8	(0)
2017–2018	→ Hapoel Umm al-Fahm	20	(9)
2018–2019	Maccabi Herzliya	13	(2)
2019	Hapoel Umm al-Fahm	11	(5)
2019–2021	Hapoel Iksal	46	(25)
2021–2022	Hapoel Umm al-Fahm	18	(7)
2022–2024	Ironi Tiberias	21	(5)

International career
2007–2008	Israel U17	9	(2)
2009	Israel U19	4	(3)
- * Club domestic league appearances and goals

Timor Avitan
Medal record

Representing Israel

Football

Maccabiah Games
Bronze medal – third place	2009 Maccabiah	Football

Timor Avitan (Hebrew: תימור אביטן; born 27 November 1991) is an Israeli retired professional footballer who played as striker.

== Biography ==
=== Playing career ===
Avitan was born in Dimona, moving to Ashdod when he was 11 years old. Avitan made his league debut in a Premier League match against Maccabi Tel Aviv on 30 May 2009 when he replaced Idan Sade in the 46th minute.

==== International career ====
Avitan represented Israel at the 2009 Maccabiah Games, winning a bronze medal.
