= Dudu Twito =

Israeli footballer

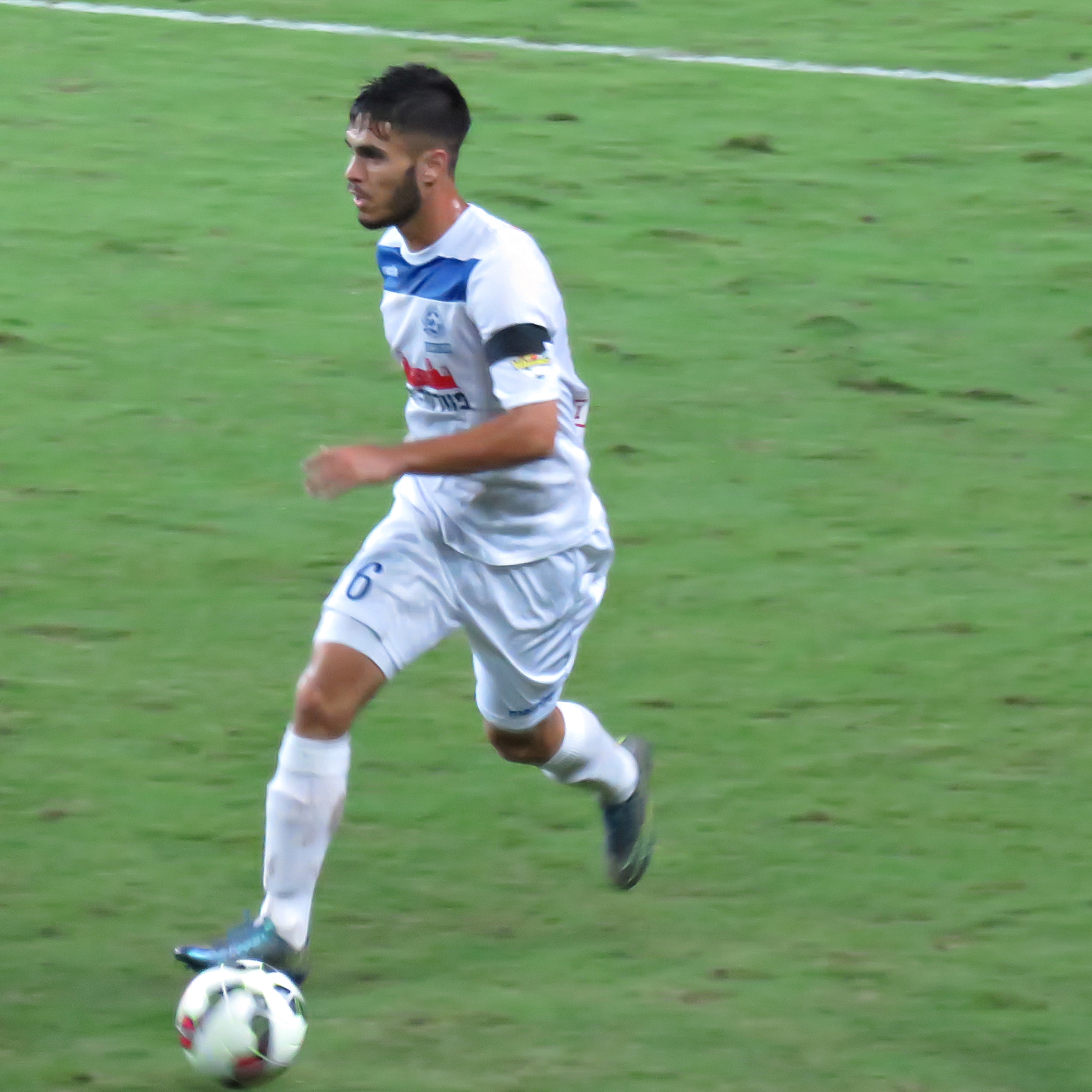

Personal information
- Full name: Dudu Twito
- Date of birth: 6 February 1994 (age 32)
- Place of birth: Be'er Sheva, Israel
- Height: 1.80 m (5 ft 11 in)
- Position: Left back

Team information
- Current team: Hapoel Ramat Gan
- Number: 36

Youth career
- Hapoel Be'er Sheva

Senior career*
Years	Team	Apps	(Gls)
2014–2017	Hapoel Be'er Sheva	5	(0)
2015–2016	→ Maccabi Petah Tikva	15	(1)
2016–2017	→ Maccabi Sha'arayim	29	(0)
2017–2018	Hapoel Afula	33	(4)
2018–2019	Maccabi Netanya	12	(0)
2019–2020	Maccabi Petah Tikva	32	(1)
2020–2021	Hapoel Be'er Sheva	16	(0)
2021–2023	Hapoel Haifa	65	(2)
2023–2025	Ironi Kiryat Shmona	61	(1)
2025–	Hapoel Ramat Gan	35	(0)

International career
2015	Israel U21	5	(0)
- * Club domestic league appearances and goals as of 24 June 2026

Dudu Twito (Hebrew: דודו טויטו; born 6 February 1994, in Be'er Sheva) is an Israeli footballer who plays for Hapoel Ramat Gan.

== Career ==
He made his debut for Hapoel Be'er Sheva against Maccabi Haifa in May 2014.

== Club career statistics ==
(correct as of 24 June 2026)

Club	Season	League	League		Cup		Toto Cup		Europe		Total	
Club	Season	League	Apps	Goals	Apps	Goals	Apps	Goals	Apps	Goals	Apps	Goals
Hapoel Be'er Sheva	2013–14	Ligat Ha'Al	1	0	0	0	0	0	0	0	1	0
Hapoel Be'er Sheva	2014–15	Ligat Ha'Al	4	0	2	0	1	0	0	0	7	0
Maccabi Petah Tikva	2015–16	Ligat Ha'Al	15	1	2	0	5	0	0	0	22	1
Maccabi Sha'arayim	2016–17	Liga Leumit	29	0	2	0	6	1	0	0	37	1
Hapoel Afula	2017–18	Liga Leumit	33	4	1	0	4	0	0	0	38	4
Maccabi Netanya	2018–19	Ligat Ha'Al	12	0	0	0	5	0	0	0	17	0
Maccabi Petah Tikva	2019–20	Liga Leumit	32	1	6	0	4	0	0	0	42	1
Hapoel Be'er Sheva	2020–21	Ligat Ha'Al	16	0	2	0	0	0	2	0	20	0
Hapoel Haifa	2021–22	Ligat Ha'Al	32	1	4	0	5	0	0	0	41	1
Hapoel Haifa	2022–23	Ligat Ha'Al	24	1	2	0	2	0	0	0	28	1
Ironi Kiryat Shmona	2023–24	Liga Leumit	35	0	2	0	4	0	0	0	41	0
Ironi Kiryat Shmona	2024–25	Israeli Premier League	26	1	1	0	4	0	0	0	31	1
Hapoel Ramat Gan	2025–26	Liga Leumit	35	0	2	0	0	0	0	0	37	0
Total Career			294	9	26	0	40	1	2	0	362	10

== Honours ==
=== Club ===
Hapoel Beer Sheva

- Israeli Premier League: Runner-up: 2013-14
- Israeli State Cup: Runner-up: 2014-15

Maccabi Petah Tikva

- Toto Cup: 2015–16

Maccabi Sha'arayim

- Toto Cup Leumit: 2016–17
