= Sharon Levy =

Israeli footballer

Personal information
- Date of birth: June 1, 1987 (age 39)
- Place of birth: Nahariya, Israel
- Position: Left back

Team information
- Current team: Maccabi Sektzia Ma'alot-Tarshiha

Youth career
- Ironi Kiryat Ata

Senior career*
Years	Team	Apps	(Gls)
2007–2008	Ironi Kiryat Ata	30	(1)
2008–2014	Hapoel Haifa	32	(1)
2012–2013	→ Ironi Tiberias (loan)	29	(1)
2014–2015	Ironi Nesher	11	(0)
2015–2017	Maccabi Tzur Shalom	55	(2)
2017–2018	Hapoel Iksal	26	(0)
2018–2020	Hapoel Umm al-Fahm	51	(0)
2020	Maccabi Ahi Nazareth	6	(0)
2020–2021	Maccabi Bnei Reineh	20	(1)
2021–2022	Ironi Tiberias	29	(1)
2022–2023	Ihud Bnei Shefa-'Amr	30	(2)
2023	Maccabi Umm al-Fahm	4	(0)
2023–2024	F.C. Kiryat Yam	28	(0)
2024–2025	Hapoel Bnei Zalafa	12	(1)
2025	Ironi Bnei Kabul	10	(0)
2025–	Maccabi Sektzia Ma'alot-Tarshiha	18	(0)
- * Club domestic league appearances and goals as of 10 January 2026

Sharon Levy (Hebrew: שרון לוי; born June 1, 1987) is an Israeli footballer currently playing for Maccabi Sektzia Ma'alot-Tarshiha.
