= Stav Zalait =

Israeli footballer

Stav Zalait סתיו זלאיט
Personal information
- Full name: Stav Zalait
- Date of birth: October 4, 1995 (age 31)
- Place of birth: Herzliya, Israel
- Position: Midfielder

Team information
- Current team: Hapoel Ramat Yisrael F.C.

Youth career
- Maccabi Netanya

Senior career*
Years	Team	Apps	(Gls)
2014–2016	Maccabi Netanya	1	(0)
2015–2016	→ Hapoel Petah Tikva	3	(0)
2016	→ Hapoel Ramat HaSharon	3	(0)
2016	Sektzia Ness Ziona	4	(0)
2016–2017	Beitar Kfar Saba	18	(1)
2017	Hapoel Mahane Yehuda	8	(0)
2017–2019	Hakoah Amidar Ramat Gan	48	(8)
2019–2020	Hapoel Kfar Shalem	14	(1)
2020	Hakoah Amidar Ramat Gan	4	(1)
2020–2021	F.C. Holon Yermiyahu	15	(1)
2021	F.C. Tira	12	(1)
2021–2022	Hapoel Azor	7	(1)
2022–2023	Elitzur Yehud	12	(14)
2025–	Hapoel Ramat Israel	0	(0)
- * Club domestic league appearances and goals as of 1 August 2025

Stav Zalait (Hebrew: סתיו זלאיט; born October 4, 1995) is an Israeli footballer who plays for Hapoel Ramat Yisrael.
