= Noam Cohen (footballer) =

Israeli footballer

Personal information
- Date of birth: 6 January 1999 (age 27)
- Place of birth: Shoham, Israel
- Height: 1.82 m (5 ft 11 1/2 in)
- Position: Defender

Team information
- Current team: Hapoel Petah Tikva

Youth career
- 2008–2013: Maccabi Shoham
- 2013–2018: Maccabi Tel Aviv

Senior career*
Years	Team	Apps	(Gls)
2018–2022	Maccabi Tel Aviv	0	(0)
2018–2019	→ Beitar Tel Aviv Bat Yam (loan)	30	(0)
2019–2020	→ Sektzia Ness Ziona (loan)	22	(0)
2020–2021	→ Hapoel Hadera (loan)	26	(0)
2021–2022	→ Hapoel Haifa (loan)	23	(0)
2022–2025	Ironi Kiryat Shmona	85	(3)
2025–	Hapoel Petah Tikva	23	(0)
- * Club domestic league appearances and goals as of 6 June 2026

Noam Cohen (Hebrew: נעם כהן; born 6 January 1999) is an Israeli footballer who plays as a defender for Hapoel Petah Tikva.

== Career ==
=== Club career ===
Cohen started his career with Israeli top flight side Maccabi Tel Aviv. In 2018, he was sent on loan to Beitar Tel Aviv Bat Yam in the Israeli second tier. In 2019, Cohen was sent on loan to Israeli top flight club Sektzia Ness Ziona, where he made 22 league appearances and scored 0 goals. On 31 August 2019, he debuted for Sektzia Ness Ziona during a 0–3 loss to Maccabi Netanya.

=== International career ===
Cohen is eligible to represent Luxembourg internationally through his grandparents.
