= List of Israeli football transfers summer 2023 =

This is a list of Israeli football transfers for the 2023 Summer Transfer Window.

== Ligat Ha'Al ==
=== Beitar Jerusalem ===
In:

No.	Pos.	Nation	Player
—	DF	ISR	Grigori Morozov (from (Slovenia) Celje, previously loaned)
—	DF	ISR	Ben Bitton (from Hapoel Tel Aviv)
—	DF	ISR	Edi Gotlieb (from Hapoel Tel Aviv)
—	DF	ISR	Omer Korsia (from (Cyprus) Enosis Neon Paralimni)
—	MF	ISR	Yuval Ashkenazi (from Bnei Sakhnin)
—	MF	ISR	Dor Micha (from Hapoel Be'er Sheva)
—	MF	MNE	Deni Hočko (from (Cyprus) Pafos)
—	MF	CIV	Ismaila Soro (from (Scotland) Celtic)
—	MF	ISR	Gidi Kanyuk (from Hapoel Haifa)
—	FW	ISR	Timothy Muzie (from Maccabi Haifa, previously loaned to Ironi Kiryat Shmona)
—	FW	COD	Branham Kabala (from (Tunisia) ES Métlaoui)
—	FW	ISR	Amir Berkovits (from Maccabi Petah Tikva)
—	FW	CRC	Mayron George (from (France) Pau)
—	FW	ISR	Rom Alyagon (from Hapoel Be'er Sheva)

Out:

No.	Pos.	Nation	Player
—	GK	ISR	Netanel Daloya (Free agent)
—	GK	ISR	Itamar Israeli (Free agent)
—	DF	RUS	Sergei Borodin (loan return to (Russia) Krasnodar)
—	DF	ISR	Max Grechkin (to Hapoel Jerusalem)
—	DF	ISR	Avishay Cohen (to Maccabi Tel Aviv)
—	DF	ISR	Or Zahavi (to (Greece) Ionikos)
—	DF	ISR	Amit Cohen (to Maccabi Jaffa)
—	MF	ISR	Ilay Madmon (loan return to Hapoel Be'er Sheva)
—	MF	ISR	Tamir Adi (to Hapoel Hadera)
—	MF	ISR	Bar Cohen (to Maccabi Netanya, previously loaned from Maccabi Tel Aviv)
—	MF	ISR	Idan David (on loan to Hapoel Nof HaGalil)
—	MF	ISR	Meiron Tal (on loan to Nordia Jerusalem)
—	MF	ISR	Gidi Kanyuk (to Hapoel Ramat Gan)
—	FW	COL	Danilo Asprilla (to (Bulgaria) CSKA Sofia)
—	FW	MDA	Ion Nicolaescu (to (Netherlands) Heerenveen)
—	FW	COD	Branham Kabala (on loan to Hapoel Rishon LeZion)

=== Bnei Sakhnin ===
In:

No.	Pos.	Nation	Player
—	GK	ISR	Mohammed Abu Nil (loan return from Maccabi Bnei Reineh)
—	GK	GUA	Nicholas Hagen (from (Norway) HamKam)
—	DF	ISR	Aviv Solomon (from Hapoel Be'er Sheva)
—	DF	ISR	Yazan Nassar (from F.C. Kafr Qasim)
—	DF	MNE	Ilija Martinović (from (Bosnia and Herzegovina) Sarajevo)
—	DF	ISR	Rotem Keller (on loan from Maccabi Netanya)
—	MF	ISR	Matanel Tadesa (from Ironi Tiberias)
—	MF	ROU	Adrian Păun (on loan from Hapoel Be'er Sheva)
—	FW	ISR	Mohammed Shaker (on loan from Ironi Kiryat Shmona)
—	FW	BEL	Stéphane Oméonga (from (Scotland) Livingston)
—	FW	PLE	Alaa Aldeen Hassan (from Hapoel Umm al-Fahm)
—	FW	ISR	Muflah Shalata (on loan from Maccabi Tel Aviv)
—	FW	ISR	Yoel Abuhatzira (from Hapoel Kfar Saba)
—	FW	ISR	Zahi Ahmed (on loan from Hapoel Be'er Sheva)
—	FW	CUW	Rangelo Janga (from (Romania) Cluj)

Out:

No.	Pos.	Nation	Player
—	GK	ISR	Mahmmoud Kanadil (Free agent)
—	GK	ISR	Gad Amos (to Maccabi Bnei Reineh)
—	DF	CRO	Ante Puljić (Free agent)
—	DF	ISR	Yazen Nassar (to Bnei Yehuda)
—	DF	CIV	Abou Dosso (to (Azerbaijan) Sumgayit)
—	MF	ISR	Roei Shukrani (to Maccabi Bnei Reineh)
—	MF	ISR	Marwan Kabha (to Maccabi Bnei Reineh)
—	MF	ISR	Yuval Ashkenazi (to Beitar Jerusalem)
—	MF	ITA	Nicolao Dumitru (to (Thailand) Buriram United)
—	FW	ISR	Guy Melamed (to Hapoel Haifa)
—	MF	ISR	Ihab Ghanayem (to (Kazakhstan) Aktobe)
—	MF	ISR	Tanos Bana (to Hapoel Acre)
—	FW	ISR	Gaëtan Varenne (Retired)
—	FW	ISR	Fadil Zbedat (on loan to Maccabi Jaffa)
—	FW	GLP	Ange-Freddy Plumain (to (Ukraine) Rukh Lviv)

=== F.C. Ashdod ===
In:

No.	Pos.	Nation	Player
—	GK	ISR	Ariel Harush (from Hapoel Be'er Sheva)
—	DF	SCO	Clark Robertson (from (England) Portsmouth)
—	MF	ISR	Shlomi Azulay (from Hapoel Tel Aviv)
—	MF	ISR	Ilay Tamam (from Hapoel Rishon LeZion)
—	MF	CMR	Martin Atemengue (loan return from Hapoel Ramat Gan)
—	FW	ISR	Stav Turiel (loan return from Hapoel Kfar Saba)
—	FW	ISR	Shavit Mazal (from Hapoel Tel Aviv, previously loaned)
—	FW	COD	Jordan Botaka (from Hapoel Jerusalem)

Out:

No.	Pos.	Nation	Player
—	GK	ISR	Yoav Gerafi (to Hapoel Haifa)
—	GK	ISR	Tomer Amar (on loan to Maccabi Kiryat Malakhi)
—	GK	ISR	Yoav Arikha (from Hapoel Umm al-Fahm)
—	DF	SRB	Nenad Cvetković (to (Austria) Rapid Wien)
—	DF	ISR	Manamto Asefa (to Hapoel Ashdod)
—	DF	ISR	Niv Belifante (on loan to Hapoel Ashdod)
—	MF	ISR	Naor Sabag (to Hapoel Haifa)
—	MF	ISR	Yarin Swissa (on loan to Hapoel Petah Tikva)
—	FW	ISR	Michael Ben Ami (on loan to Ironi Modi'in)
—	FW	NED	Elton Acolatse (to (Hungary) Diósgyőri VTK)
—	FW	ISR	Roey Ben Shimon (to Hapoel Kfar Saba, his player card still belongs to Bnei Yehuda)
—	FW	GHA	Abdul Zakaria Mugees (to (Norway) Odd)

=== Hapoel Be'er Sheva ===
In:

No.	Pos.	Nation	Player
—	GK	ISR	Ofir Marciano (from (Netherlands) Feyenoord)
—	DF	ISR	Hatem Abd Elhamed (loan return from Hapoel Haifa)
—	DF	ISR	Niv Fliter (from Maccabi Kabilio Jaffa)
—	DF	ISR	Harel Shalom (from Hapoel Jerusalem)
—	MF	ISR	Ilay Madmon (loan return from Beitar Jerusalem)
—	MF	ISR	Yoni Stoyanov (loan return from Sektzia Ness Ziona)
—	MF	ROU	Antonio Sefer (from (Romania) Rapid București)
—	MF	ISR	Guy Badash (from Hapoel Jerusalem)
—	MF	GAB	André Biyogo Poko (from (Saudi Arabia) Al-Khaleej)
—	MF	NED	Imran Oulad Omar (from (Georgia (country)) Dinamo Tbilisi)
—	FW	ISR	Zahi Ahmed (from Hapoel Acre)
—	FW	ISR	Alon Turgeman (from Hapoel Haifa)
—	FW	SWE	Kristoffer Peterson (from (Germany) Fortuna Düsseldorf)
—	FW	ISR	Eylon Almog (from Maccabi Tel Aviv)

Out:

No.	Pos.	Nation	Player
—	GK	ISR	Omri Glazer (to (Serbia) Red Star Belgrade)
—	GK	ISR	Ariel Harush (to F.C. Ashdod)
—	DF	ISR	Aviv Solomon (to Bnei Sakhnin)
—	DF	ISR	Or Dadia (on loan to (Scotland) Aberdeen)
—	DF	ISR	Or Blorian (on loan to Hapoel Tel Aviv)
—	DF	ISR	Amir Ariely (on loan to Hapoel Jerusalem)
—	DF	ISR	Liad Abutbul (to F.C. Dimona)
—	DF	ISR	Khaled Zaid (on loan to F.C. Dimona)
—	DF	CIV	Abdoul Coulibaly (on loan to Maccabi Herzliya)
—	DF	ISR	Sagiv Yehezkel (to (Turkey) Antalyaspor)
—	DF	ISR	Hatem Abd Elhamed (to Hapoel Haifa)
—	MF	ISR	Tomer Yosefi (to Hapoel Haifa, previously loaned)
—	MF	ISR	Dor Micha (to Beitar Jerusalem)
—	MF	ISR	Ramzi Safouri (to (Turkey) Antalyaspor)
—	MF	ROU	Adrian Păun (on loan to Bnei Sakhnin)
—	FW	RUS	Magomed-Shapi Suleymanov (loan return to (Russia) Krasnodar)
—	FW	ISR	Itay Shechter (to Hapoel Petah Tikva)
—	FW	GHA	Eugene Ansah (to (United States) FC Dallas)
—	FW	ISR	Zahi Ahmed (on loan to Bnei Sakhnin)
—	FW	ISR	Rom Alyagon (to Beitar Jerusalem, previously loaned to Hapoel Ramat HaSharon)

=== Hapoel Hadera ===
In:

No.	Pos.	Nation	Player
—	GK	ISR	Ohad Levita (from Hapoel Haifa)
—	GK	ISR	Nikola Đurković (from (Serbia) FK Rad)
—	DF	ISR	Sapir Itah (from Hapoel Acre)
—	DF	ISR	Dolev Azruel (on loan from Maccabi Bnei Reineh)
—	DF	CIV	Kouya Mabea (from (Belgium) K.V.C. Westerlo)
—	DF	CIV	Souleymane Coulibaly (from (Ivory Coast) ASEC Mimosas)
—	DF	BEL	Aaron Leya Iseka (on loan from (England) Barnsley)
—	MF	ISR	Tamir Adi (from Beitar Jerusalem)
—	MF	ISR	Tamir Glazer (on loan from Maccabi Tel Aviv)
—	MF	ISR	Ilay Trost (from Sektzia Ness Ziona)
—	FW	ISR	Dor Jan (from Hapoel Jerusalem)
—	FW	ISR	Orel Baye (on loan from Maccabi Tel Aviv)
—	FW	GNB	Toni Gomes (from (Azerbaijan) Zira)
—	FW	ISR	Ohad Barzilay (from Hapoel Rishon LeZion)
—	FW	ISR	Raz Twizer (from Hapoel Tel Aviv)

Out:

No.	Pos.	Nation	Player
—	GK	ISR	Robi Levkovich (to Maccabi Petah Tikva)
—	DF	ISR	Tarek Boshanek (to Maccabi Bnei Reineh)
—	DF	SVN	Klemen Šturm (to (Bosnia and Herzegovina) Velež Mostar)
—	DF	ISR	Tomer Machluf (loan return to Maccabi Tel Aviv)
—	DF	ISR	Rotem Keller (to Bnei Sakhnin, his player card still belongs to Maccabi Netanya)
—	DF	CIV	Jonathan Cissé (to (Romania) Oțelul Galați)
—	DF	ISR	Lidor Maimon (on loan to Hapoel Herzliya)
—	DF	ISR	Oren Sitbon (on loan to Hapoel Acre)
—	DF	ISR	Dolev Azruel (to Hapoel Afula)
—	MF	ISR	Sa'ar Fadida (to (Slovenia) Olimpija Ljubljana)
—	MF	ISR	Ruslan Barsky (to (Bosnia and Herzegovina) Borac Banja Luka)
—	MF	ISR	Gilad Avramov (to (Azerbaijan) Gabala)
—	MF	SWE	Albert Ejupi (to (Denmark) AC Horsens)
—	MF	ISR	Ness Zamir (to Hapoel Rishon LeZion)
—	FW	ISR	Stav Nahmani (to (Scotland) St Mirren, his player card still belongs to Maccabi Haifa)
—	FW	NGA	Steven Alfred (to Maccabi Herzliya)
—	FW	ISR	Eyal Hen (to Bnei Yehuda his player card still belongs to Maccabi Tel Aviv)
—	FW	ISR	Amit Yeverbaum (to Hapoel Ramat HaSharon)

=== Hapoel Haifa ===
In:

No.	Pos.	Nation	Player
—	GK	ISR	Yoav Gerafi (from F.C. Ashdod)
—	GK	ISR	Niv Antman (from Sektzia Ness Ziona)
—	DF	ISR	Inon Eliyahu (from Maccabi Haifa)
—	DF	ISR	George Diba (from Hapoel Acre)
—	DF	ISR	Nitay Bitan (from Maccabi Akhi Nazareth)
—	DF	CGO	Fernand Mayembo (from (France) Ajaccio)
—	DF	ISR	Hatem Abd Elhamed (from Hapoel Be'er Sheva)
—	MF	ISR	Naor Sabag (from F.C. Ashdod)
—	MF	ISR	Itamar Noy (from (Austria) First Vienna)
—	MF	ISR	Tomer Yosefi (from Hapoel Be'er Sheva, previously loaned)
—	MF	ISR	Nitay Bitan (from Maccabi Jaffa)
—	MF	ISR	Yasmao Cabeda (from Maccabi Jaffa)
—	MF	GAM	Sulayman Marreh (from (Belgium) Gent)
—	MF	ISR	Bar Lin (on loan from Maccabi Tel Aviv)
—	FW	ISR	Guy Melamed (from Bnei Sakhnin)
—	FW	BRA	Felipe Santos (from (Azerbaijan) Gabala)
—	FW	ISR	Oded Chekol (from Maccabi Haifa)

Out:

No.	Pos.	Nation	Player
—	GK	ISR	Ohad Levita (to Hapoel Hadera)
—	DF	ISR	Dudu Twito (to Ironi Kiryat Shmona)
—	DF	ISR	Hatem Abd Elhamed (loan return to Hapoel Be'er Sheva)
—	DF	ISR	Loai Taha (to Hapoel Acre)
—	DF	ISR	Yarin Serdal (on loan to Hapoel Nof HaGalil)
—	DF	ISR	Guy Mizrahi (loan return to Maccabi Tel Aviv)
—	DF	ISR	Nitay Bitan (to Hapoel Acre)
—	MF	ISR	Gal Arel (Retired)
—	MF	ISR	Gidi Kanyuk (to Beitar Jerusalem)
—	MF	ISR	Eliel Peretz (to (Cyprus) Apollon Limassol)
—	MF	ISR	Tamir Glazer (to Hapoel Hadera, his player card still belongs to Maccabi Tel Aviv)
—	MF	ISR	Snir Talias (to Ironi Tiberias, previously loaned)
—	MF	MNE	Aleksandar Šćekić (to (Serbia) Partizan)
—	FW	ISR	Alon Turgeman (to Hapoel Be'er Sheva)
—	FW	LTU	Arvydas Novikovas (to (Lithuania) Žalgiris)
—	FW	HAI	Carnejy Antoine (to (Portugal) Torreense)
—	FW	ISR	Jubayer Bushnak (on loan to Ihud Bnei Shefa-'Amr)

=== Hapoel Jerusalem ===
In:

No.	Pos.	Nation	Player
—	GK	ISR	Nadav Zamir (from Ironi Kiryat Shmona)
—	DF	ISR	Max Grechkin (from Beitar Jerusalem)
—	DF	ISR	Amir Ariely (on loan from Hapoel Be'er Sheva)
—	DF	ISR	Ofek Nadir (from Hapoel Afula)
—	DF	ISR	Shahar Piven (from Maccabi Tel Aviv)
—	FW	ISR	Idan Dahan (from Hapoel Ashdod)
—	FW	CIV	Cédric Franck Don (from JC d'Abidjan, previously loaned)
—	FW	ISR	Or Roizman (on loan from Maccabi Tel Aviv)
—	FW	EST	Rauno Sappinen (from (Poland) Piast Gliwice)
—	FW	ISR	Ben Azubel (Free transfer)
—	FW	ISR	Matan Hozez (on loan from Maccabi Tel Aviv)
—	FW	ANG	Capita (on loan from (Portugal) Estrela da Amadora)
—	FW	NED	Jelle Duin (on loan from (Netherlands) AZ Alkmaar)

Out:

No.	Pos.	Nation	Player
—	GK	ISR	Yehonatan Shabi (to Bnei Yehuda)
—	GK	ISR	Omer Kabilo (to Maccabi Herzliya)
—	DF	ISR	Roy Revivo (loan return to Maccabi Tel Aviv)
—	DF	ISR	Harel Shalom (to Hapoel Be'er Sheva)
—	MF	ISR	Guy Badash (to Hapoel Be'er Sheva)
—	MF	ISR	Golan Beni (to Hapoel Petah Tikva)
—	MF	ISR	Nadav Nidam (loan return to Maccabi Tel Aviv)
—	FW	ISR	Noaf Bazea (to Hapoel Umm al-Fahm)
—	FW	ISR	Dor Jan (to Hapoel Hadera)
—	FW	ISR	Yoav Tomer (Free agent)
—	FW	ISR	Ben Azubel (to Hapoel Umm al-Fahm)
—	FW	COD	Jordan Botaka (to F.C. Ashdod)

=== Hapoel Petah Tikva ===
In:

No.	Pos.	Nation	Player
—	GK	GRE	Nikos Giannakopoulos (Free transfer)
—	DF	ISR	Daniel Fleczer (from Maccabi Petah Tikva)
—	DF	ECU	Jean Quiñónez (on loan from (Colombia) Deportes Quindío)
—	DF	POR	André Teixeira (from (Cyprus) AEL Limassol)
—	DF	ISR	Roey Elimelech (on loan from Maccabi Haifa)
—	MF	GHA	Richard Boateng (from Maccabi Bnei Reineh)
—	MF	ISR	Avi Rikan (from Maccabi Tel Aviv)
—	MF	ISR	Roy Nawi (on loan from Maccabi Tel Aviv)
—	MF	ISR	Samuel Broun (from Ironi Kiryat Shmona)
—	MF	ISR	Yarin Swissa (on loan from F.C. Ashdod)
—	MF	ISR	Golan Beni (from Hapoel Jerusalem)
—	FW	ISR	Itay Shechter (from Hapoel Be'er Sheva)
—	FW	NGA	Fortune Bassey (on loan from (Hungary) Ferencváros)

Out:

No.	Pos.	Nation	Player
—	DF	ISR	Ofek Fishler (to Ihud Bnei Shefa-'Amr)
—	DF	ISR	Haim Izrin (to Ihud Bnei Shefa-'Amr)
—	DF	ISR	Ran Vaturi (Free agent)
—	MF	ISR	Moha Badir (to Ihud Bnei Shefa-'Amr)
—	MF	ISR	Ohad Rabinovich (to Hapoel Nof HaGalil)
—	MF	ISR	Lior Berkovich (to Sektzia Ness Ziona)
—	MF	ISR	Niv Berkovich (to (United States) SMU Mustangs, previously loaned from Maccabi Tel Aviv)
—	MF	ISR	Tini Chacana (on loan to Shimshon Kafr Qasim)
—	FW	ISR	Oz Peretz (Free agent)
—	FW	ISR	Roei Zikri (TO Ironi Kiryat Shmona)
—	FW	ISR	Idan Shemesh (to Ihud Bnei Shefa-'Amr)

=== Hapoel Tel Aviv ===
In:

No.	Pos.	Nation	Player
—	GK	ISR	Roy Baranes (loan return from Shimshon Tel Aviv)
—	DF	ISR	Aviv Salem (from Bnei Yehuda)
—	DF	ISR	Or Blorian (on loan from Hapoel Be'er Sheva)
—	DF	ISR	Alon Azugi (loan return from Maccabi Petah Tikva)
—	DF	CGO	Bryan Passi (from (France) Chamois Niortais)
—	DF	UGA	Aziz Kayondo (on loan from (Spain) Leganés B)
—	MF	ESP	José Rodríguez (Free transfer)
—	MF	ISR	Noam Bonnet (from (France) Olympique Lyonnais)
—	FW	ISR	Omri Altman (from (Cyprus) AEK Larnaca)
—	FW	CGO	Mavis Tchibota (from Maccabi Haifa)
—	FW	ISR	Ido Elmishly (from Maccabi Haifa)
—	FW	ISR	Gabriel Segal (from (United States) New York City)

Out:

No.	Pos.	Nation	Player
—	GK	ISR	Ido Sharon (on loan to Hapoel Ramat HaSharon)
—	GK	ISR	Lior Gliklich (on loan to Hapoel Rishon LeZion)
—	DF	ISR	Ben Bitton (to Beitar Jerusalem)
—	DF	ISR	Dor Elo (to Maccabi Bnei Reineh)
—	DF	ISR	Edi Gotlieb (to Beitar Jerusalem)
—	DF	ISR	Stav Lemkin (to (Ukraine) Shakhtar Donetsk)
—	DF	GUI	Antoine Conte (to (Bulgaria) Botev Plovdiv)
—	MF	ISR	Shlomi Azulay (to F.C. Ashdod)
—	MF	CUW	Godfried Roemeratoe (to (Netherlands) RKC Waalwijk)
—	MF	ISR	Sabastian Hernandez (on loan to Hapoel Kfar Shalem)
—	MF	CRO	Hrvoje Ilić (to (Ukraine) Kryvbas Kryvyi Rih)
—	MF	ESP	Pablo González (Freea agent)
—	FW	ISR	Rave Assayag (to Hapoel Acre)
—	FW	ISR	Shavit Mazal (to F.C. Ashdod, previously loaned)
—	FW	ISR	Qays Ghanem (to Maccabi Bnei Reineh)
—	FW	ISR	Niv Zrihan (to Maccabi Jaffa)
—	FW	ISR	Raz Twizer (to Hapoel Hadera)

=== Maccabi Bnei Reineh ===
In:

No.	Pos.	Nation	Player
—	GK	ISR	Gad Amos (from Bnei Sakhnin)
—	GK	ISR	Omar Nahfaoui (from Maccabi Akhi Nazareth)
—	DF	ISR	Tarek Boshanek (from Hapoel Hadera)
—	DF	ISR	Dor Elo (from Hapoel Tel Aviv)
—	DF	SRB	Nemanja Ljubisavljević (from (Serbia) FK Vojvodina)
—	MF	ISR	Roei Shukrani (from Bnei Sakhnin)
—	MF	ISR	Marwan Kabha (from Bnei Sakhnin)
—	MF	NGA	Muhammed Usman Edu (from Sektzia Ness Ziona)
—	MF	BOL	Henry Vaca (from (Bolivia) Oriente Petrolero)
—	MF	VEN	Freddy Vargas (from (Venezuela) Metropolitanos)
—	FW	HUN	Márk Koszta (from (Russia) Torpedo Moscow, previously loaned)
—	FW	ISR	Qays Ghanem (from Hapoel Tel Aviv)
—	FW	ISR	Osher Eliyahu (on loan from Maccabi Netanya)

Out:

No.	Pos.	Nation	Player
—	GK	ISR	Arik Yanko (to Hapoel Umm al-Fahm)
—	GK	ISR	Mohammed Abu Nil (loan return to Bnei Sakhnin)
—	DF	ISR	Dolev Azruel (on loan to Hapoel Hadera)
—	DF	ISR	Namir Aga (to Ironi Tiberias)
—	DF	ISR	Nir Bardea (to (Azerbaijan) Sabail)
—	DF	AUT	Lukas Spendlhofer (to (Poland) Bruk-Bet Termalica Nieciecza)
—	DF	ISR	Ali Abbas (on loan to Ihud Bnei Shefa-'Amr)
—	MF	GHA	Richard Boateng (to Hapoel Petah Tikva)
—	MF	BRA	Gustavo Marmentini (loan return to (Greece) Lamia)
—	MF	ISR	Yaniv Brik (to Ironi Tiberias)
—	MF	ISR	Ali Abbas (Free agent)
—	MF	MAD	Anicet Abel (Free agent)
—	FW	ISR	Osama Khalaila (to (Azerbaijan) Gabala, previously loaned from Maccabi Tel Aviv)
—	FW	ISR	Muflah Shalata (to Bnei Sakhnin, his player card still belongs to Maccabi Tel Aviv)
—	FW	ISR	Amit Zenati (to Hapoel Umm al-Fahm)
—	FW	ISR	Ahmed Abed (to Ironi Tiberias)

=== Maccabi Haifa ===
In:

No.	Pos.	Nation	Player
—	GK	ISR	Itamar Nitzan (from Maccabi Netanya)
—	DF	FRA	Pierre Cornud (from (Spain) Real Oviedo, previously loaned)
—	DF	ISR	Maor Kandil (from Maccabi Tel Aviv)
—	DF	ISR	Roey Elimelech (loan return from Hapoel Afula)
—	DF	CRO	Lorenco Šimić (from (Italy) Ascoli)
—	DF	ISR	Adar Azruel (on loan from Maccabi Haifa)
—	MF	ISR	Ilay Hagag (loan return from Hapoel Afula)
—	MF	ANG	Show (from (Bulgaria) Ludogorets Razgrad)
—	FW	GER	Erik Shuranov (from (Germany) 1. FC Nürnberg)
—	FW	ISR	Suf Podgoreanu (from (Italy) Spezia, previously loaned)
—	FW	ISR	Lior Refaelov (from (Belgium) Anderlecht)

Out:

No.	Pos.	Nation	Player
—	GK	ISR	Roi Mishpati (to Maccabi Tel Aviv)
—	GK	ISR	Nitay Greis (on loan to Hapoel Afula)
—	DF	COD	Dylan Batubinsika (loan return to (Portugal) Famalicão)
—	DF	ISR	Inon Eliyahu (to Hapoel Haifa)
—	DF	ISR	Raz Meir (to (Netherlands) RKC Waalwijk)
—	DF	ISR	Liam Hermash (on loan to Hapoel Afula)
—	DF	ISR	Liad Levi (on loan to Hapoel Umm al-Fahm)
—	DF	ISR	Ziv Leigh (to Ironi Kiryat Shmona)
—	DF	ISR	Yonatan Laish (on loan to Hapoel Afula)
—	DF	ISR	Roey Elimelech (on loan to Hapoel Petah Tikva)
—	DF	ISR	Noam Or Marelly (on loan to Hapoel Acre)
—	MF	ISR	Mohammad Abu Fani (to (Hungary) Ferencvárosi TC)
—	MF	ISR	Aviel Zargari (on loan to Maccabi Petah Tikva)
—	MF	ISR	Ihab Abu Alshikh (to F.C. Kafr Qasim, loaned to Hapoel Afula)
—	FW	ISR	Ben Sahar (to Maccabi Petah Tikva)
—	FW	ISR	Omer Atzili (to (United Arab Emirates) Al Ain)
—	FW	ISR	Timothy Muzie (to Beitar Jerusalem, previously loaned to Ironi Kiryat Shmona)
—	FW	ISR	Sapir Razon (to Ironi Tiberias)
—	FW	CGO	Mavis Tchibota (to Hapoel Tel Aviv)
—	FW	ISR	Ziv Ben Shimol (on loan to Hapoel Afula)
—	FW	ISR	Ido Elmishly (to Hapoel Tel Aviv)
—	FW	ISR	Oded Chekol (to Hapoel Haifa, previously loaned to Hapoel Nof HaGalil)

=== Maccabi Netanya ===
In:

No.	Pos.	Nation	Player
—	GK	ISR	Poraz Wolkovitz (from Hapoel Ramat HaSharon)
—	DF	ISR	Joel Abu Hanna (from (Poland) Legia Warsaw)
—	DF	ISR	Itay Ben Shabat (from Ironi Kiryat Shmona)
—	DF	ISR	Matan Levi (loan return from Hapoel Ramat Gan)
—	DF	ISR	Guy Mizrahi (from Maccabi Tel Aviv)
—	MF	ISR	Maxim Plakuschenko (from (Hungary) Budapest Honvéd)
—	MF	ISR	Bar Cohen (from Maccabi Tel Aviv)
—	FW	CRC	Rachid Chirino (from (Costa Rica) A.D. San Carlos)
—	FW	ISR	Itamar Shviro (from Ironi Kiryat Shmona)

Out:

No.	Pos.	Nation	Player
—	GK	ISR	Itamar Nitzan (to Maccabi Haifa)
—	GK	ISR	Tomer Livitanov (to Hapoel Nof HaGalil, previously loaned to Ironi Tiberias)
—	GK	ISR	Shahar Ben Yakar (to Hapoel Marmorek)
—	DF	ISR	Raz Shlomo (to (Belgium) OH Leuven)
—	DF	ISR	Shay Konstantini (to Ironi Tiberias)
—	MF	ISR	Omri Gandelman (to (Belgium) Gent)
—	FW	ISR	Amir Berkovits (to Maccabi Petah Tikva)
—	FW	GHA	Patrick Twumasi (to (Cyprus) Pafos)
—	FW	ZAM	Richard Ngoma (on loan to Hapoel Ramat Gan)
—	FW	ISR	Osher Eliyahu (on loan to Maccabi Bnei Reineh)
—	FW	ISR	Omar Younes (on loan to F.C. Kafr Qasim)

=== Maccabi Petah Tikva ===
In:

No.	Pos.	Nation	Player
—	GK	ISR	Robi Levkovich (from Hapoel Hadera)
—	GK	ISR	Ofek Melika (from Hapoel Ra'anana)
—	DF	BEN	Moïse Adiléhou (from (Azerbaijan) Zira)
—	DF	ISR	Ronny Laufer (on loan from Maccabi Haifa)
—	DF	ITA	Lorenzo Paramatti (from (Romania) FC U Craiova)
—	MF	ISR	Arad Bar (from (Switzerland) FC Zürich)
—	MF	NGA	Ibraheem Jabaar (from (South Africa) Stellenbosch)
—	MF	ISR	Yonatan Teper (from Hapoel Acre)
—	MF	ISR	Aviel Zargari (on loan from Maccabi Petah Tikva)
—	FW	ISR	Amir Berkovits (from Maccabi Netanya)
—	FW	ISR	Anas Mahamid (from Hapoel Umm al-Fahm)
—	FW	ISR	Ben Sahar (from Maccabi Haifa)
—	FW	MLI	Saliou Guindo (from (Albania) Laçi)
—	FW	FRA	Jared Khasa (from (Cyprus) AEL Limassol)

Out:

No.	Pos.	Nation	Player
—	GK	ISR	Danny Amos (to Sektzia Ness Ziona)
—	GK	ISR	Maor Erlich (on loan to F.C. Kafr Qasim)
—	DF	CIV	Cheikh Mamadou Diabaté (to Maccabi Jaffa)
—	DF	ISR	Daniel Fleczer (to Hapoel Petah Tikva)
—	DF	ISR	Gal Mayo (to Maccabi Kabilio Jaffa)
—	DF	CRO	Branko Vrgoč (to (Bosnia and Herzegovina) HŠK Posušje)
—	DF	ISR	Dolev Azulay (to Hapoel Nof HaGalil)
—	DF	ISR	Idan Cohen (Free agent)
—	DF	ISR	Itay Ozeri (to Hapoel Ramat Gan)
—	DF	ISR	Alon Azugi (loan return to Hapoel Tel Aviv)
—	DF	ISR	Ilay Shifki (on loan to F.C. Kafr Qasim)
—	DF	ISR	Gal Kolani (to Hapoel Rishon LeZion)
—	MF	ISR	Dan Kaduri (on loan to Sektzia Ness Ziona)
—	MF	ISR	Shalev Daniel (to Bnei Yehuda)
—	FW	UKR	Daniel Joulani (on loan to Hapoel Kfar Saba)
—	FW	ISR	Guy Dahan (to F.C. Kafr Qasim)
—	FW	ISR	Amir Berkovits (to Beitar Jerusalem)
—	FW	ISR	Yehonatan Levy (to Hapoel Rishon LeZion)

=== Maccabi Tel Aviv ===
In:

No.	Pos.	Nation	Player
—	GK	ISR	Roi Mishpati (from Maccabi Haifa)
—	GK	PAN	Orlando Mosquera (from (Venezuela) Monagas)
—	DF	ISR	Roy Revivo (loan return from Hapoel Jerusalem)
—	DF	FRA	Yvann Maçon (on loan from (France) Saint-Étienne)
—	DF	ISR	Avishay Cohen (from Beitar Jerusalem)
—	MF	ISR	Ido Shahar (loan return from (Cyprus) Apollon Limassol)
—	FW	ANG	Felício Milson (from (Russia) Pari Nizhny Novgorod)
—	FW	ISR	Osher Davida (from (Belgium) Standard Liège)
—	FW	POR	Kiko Bondoso (from (Portugal) Vizela)

Out:

No.	Pos.	Nation	Player
—	GK	ISR	Daniel Peretz (to (Germany) Bayern Munich)
—	GK	ISR	Tomer Alon (on loan to Hapoel Ramat Gan)
—	DF	ISR	Ilay Tomer (on loan to Sektzia Ness Ziona)
—	DF	ISR	Michael Chilaka (to (United States) San Diego Loyal, previously loaned to Hapoel Umm al-Fahm)
—	DF	ISR	Shahar Piven (to Hapoel Jerusalem)
—	DF	ISR	Ariel Blasson (on loan to Shimshon Tel Aviv)
—	DF	ISR	Guy Mizrahi (to Maccabi Netanya)
—	MF	ROU	Rareș Ilie (to (Switzerland) Lausanne-Sport, his player card still belongs to (France) Nice)
—	MF	ISR	Avi Rikan (to Hapoel Petah Tikva)
—	MF	ISR	Roy Nawi (on loan to Hapoel Petah Tikva)
—	MF	ISR	Bar Cohen (to Maccabi Netanya, previously loaned to Beitar Jerusalem)
—	MF	ISR	Niv Berkovich (to (United States) SMU Mustangs, previously loaned to Hapoel Petah Tikva)
—	MF	CIV	Parfait Guiagon (to (Belgium) Charleroi)
—	MF	ISR	Dan Glazer (to (Greece) OFI Crete)
—	MF	ISR	Bar Lin (on loan to Hapoel Haifa)
—	FW	ISR	Osama Khalaila (to (Azerbaijan) Gabala, previously loaned to Maccabi Bnei Reineh)
—	FW	ISR	Yakir Zilberman (to Maccabi Jaffa)
—	FW	ISR	Orel Baye (on loan to Hapoel Hadera)
—	FW	ISR	Matan Hozez (on loan to Hapoel Jerusalem)
—	FW	SRB	Đorđe Jovanović (to (Switzerland) FC Basel)
—	FW	ISR	Eylon Almog (to Hapoel Be'er Sheva)

== Liga Leumit ==
=== Bnei Yehuda ===
In:

No.	Pos.	Nation	Player
—	GK	ISR	Tamir Lalou (from F.C. Dimona)
—	GK	ISR	Yehonatan Shabi (from Hapoel Jerusalem)
—	DF	ISR	Stav Israeli (from Sektzia Ness Ziona)
—	DF	ISR	Tamir Haimovich (from Hapoel Herzliya)
—	DF	ISR	Shahar Rosen (on loan from Maccabi Tel Aviv)
—	DF	ISR	Yazen Nassar (from Bnei Sakhnin)
—	DF	CIV	Souleymane Fofana (from (Cyprus) Akritas Chlorakas)
—	DF	ISR	Yogev Lerman (from F.C. Kafr Qasim)
—	DF	ISR	Idan Ratta (from Hapoel Ramat HaSharon)
—	MF	ISR	Dor Kochav (from Sektzia Ness Ziona)
—	MF	GAM	Abubakar Barry (from Hapoel Kfar Saba)
—	MF	ISR	Solomon Daniel (from Hapoel Umm al-Fahn)
—	MF	ISR	Shalev Daniel (from Hapoel Umm al-Fahn)
—	FW	ISR	Shahar Hirsh (from Hapoel Afula)
—	FW	ISR	Eyal Hen (on loan from Maccabi Tel Aviv)
—	FW	ISR	Almog Buzaglo (from Sektzia Ness Ziona)
—	FW	ISR	Noam Gissin (from Maccabi Ironi Sderot)

Out:

No.	Pos.	Nation	Player
—	GK	ISR	Adi Tabachnik (to Hapoel Kfar Shalem)
—	GK	ISR	Omer Nir'on (on loan to (Bosnia and Herzegovina) Zrinjski Mostar)
—	DF	ISR	Aviv Salem (to Hapoel Tel Aviv)
—	DF	ISR	Amit Bitton (to Hapoel Ramat Gan)
—	DF	ISR	Alaa Jafar (to Ironi Kiryat Shmona)
—	DF	ISR	Omri Yehezkel (on loan to Hapoel Lod)
—	DF	ISR	Guy Hakim (Free agent)
—	DF	ISR	Netanel Amoyal (to Sektzia Ness Ziona)
—	MF	NGA	Aliyu Adam (Free agent)
—	MF	ISR	Amir Agayev (to Sektzia Ness Ziona)
—	MF	ISR	Dor Kochav (to Hapoel Ramat HaSharon)
—	MF	ISR	Shaked Navon (to Hapoel Kfar Saba)
—	FW	ISR	Ayi Silva Kangani (to Austria Wien)
—	FW	BLR	Gleb Zherdev (to (Belarus) Dinamo Minsk)
—	FW	ISR	Shay Balahssan (to Hapoel Ramat HaSharon)

=== F.C. Kafr Qasim ===
In:

No.	Pos.	Nation	Player
—	GK	ISR	Maor Erlich (on loan from Maccabi Petah Tikva)
—	DF	ISR	Fadi Najar (from Maccabi Akhi Nazareth)
—	DF	ISR	Ilay Shifki (on loan from Maccabi Petah Tikva)
—	DF	ISR	Gil Sellam (from Maccabi Akhi Nazareth)
—	DF	ISR	Noam Cohen (from Hapoel Ashdod)
—	MF	BRA	Pedro Sass (from (Montenegro) Dečić)
—	MF	ISR	Aviv Negbi (from F.C. Holon Yermiyahu)
—	MF	CIV	Alfa Mamadou Diané (from Maccabi Akhi Nazareth)
—	MF	ISR	Ihab Abu Alshikh (from Maccabi Haifa)
—	FW	ISR	Nir Abergil (from Ironi Tiberias)
—	FW	PLE	Fadi Zidan (from (Kazakhstan) FC Zhetysu)
—	FW	ISR	Guy Dahan (from Maccabi Petah Tikva)
—	FW	ISR	Omar Younes (on loan from Maccabi Netanya)

Out:

No.	Pos.	Nation	Player
—	GK	ISR	Gil Barda (to Shimshon Tel Aviv)
—	GK	ISR	Shalev Sharabi (to Hapoel Marmorek)
—	DF	ISR	Amir Ben Shimon (to Sektzia Ness Ziona)
—	DF	CIV	Doueugui Mala (to Ihud Bnei Shefa-'Amr)
—	DF	ISR	Yazan Nassar (to Bnei Sakhnin)
—	DF	ISR	Yogev Lerman (to Bnei Yehuda)
—	MF	ISR	Tambi Sagas (to Hapoel Umm al-Fahm)
—	MF	ISR	Ben Khawaz (to Sektzia Ness Ziona)
—	MF	ISR	Dor Edri (to (Cyprus) ENAD)
—	MF	ISR	Meidan Cohen (to F.C. Jerusalem, his player card still belongs to Hapoel Jerusalem)
—	FW	BUL	Zhivko Petkov (to (Bulgaria) Chernomorets 1919)
—	FW	ISR	Amer Al-Dadah (to Ihud Bnei Shefa-'Amr)
—	FW	ISR	Eden Hershkovitz (to Sektzia Ness Ziona)
—	FW	ISR	Mohammed Kalibat (to F.C. Tzeirei Kafr Kanna)
—	FW	ISR	Ramz Taha (on loan to Hapoel Kafr Qasim)
—	FW	ISR	Ahmed Darawshe (Free agent)
—	FW	BEL	Jérémie Luvovadio (to (Cyprus) POX)
—	FW	ISR	Ibrahim Badir (to Hapoel Rishon LeZion)

=== Hapoel Acre ===
In:

No.	Pos.	Nation	Player
—	DF	ISR	Hanan Biton (from Maccabi Tzur Shalom Bialik)
—	DF	ISR	Loai Taha (from Hapoel Haifa)
—	DF	ISR	Ofek Atias (from Maccabi Ata Bialik)
—	DF	SRB	Stefan Vilotić (from (Czech Republic) Bohemians 1905 B)
—	DF	ISR	Nitay Bitan (from Hapoel Haifa)
—	DF	ISR	Noam Or Marelly (on loan from Maccabi Haifa)
—	DF	ISR	Oren Sitbon (on loan from Hapoel Hadera)
—	DF	ISR	Nir Drori (from Ironi Kiryat Shmona)
—	MF	ISR	Anas Dabour (from Maccabi Akhi Nazareth)
—	MF	ISR	Asaf Hershko (from Hapoel Petah Tikva)
—	MF	ISR	Itay Tako (from Hapoel Afula)
—	MF	ISR	Ohad Hazut (from Hapoel Kfar Saba)
—	MF	ISR	Ben Amsalem (from Beitar Tel Aviv)
—	MF	ISR	Tanos Bana (from Bnei Sakhnin)
—	MF	ISR	Or Dasa (from Hapoel Ramat Gan)
—	FW	ISR	Rave Assayag (from Hapoel Tel Aviv)
—	FW	ISR	Shahaf Sapir (from Hapoel Karmiel)

Out:

No.	Pos.	Nation	Player
—	DF	ISR	Sapir Itah (to Hapoel Hadera)
—	DF	ISR	Ali Kayal (to Hapoel Nof HaGalil)
—	DF	ISR	Daniel Mor Yosef (to Hapoel Kfar Saba)
—	DF	ISR	Guy Aviv (to Hapoel Ramat Gan)
—	DF	ISR	George Diba (to Hapoel Haifa)
—	MF	ISR	Yonatan Teper (to Maccabi Petah Tikva)
—	MF	ISR	Gal Aviv (to Beitar Yavne)
—	FW	ISR	Zahi Ahmed (to Hapoel Be'er Sheva)
—	FW	ISR	Karem Arshid (to Ihud Bnei Shefa-'Amr)
—	FW	ISR	Guy Ben Lulu (loan return to Ironi Kiryat Shmona)

=== Hapoel Afula ===
In:

No.	Pos.	Nation	Player
—	GK	ISR	Nitay Greis (on loan from Maccabi Haifa)
—	GK	ISR	Sagi Malul (from Hapoel Nof HaGalil)
—	DF	ISR	Erez Shifman (from Bnei Eilat)
—	DF	ISR	Orel Cohen (from Shimshon Tel Aviv)
—	DF	ISR	Tal Kachila (from Sektzia Ness Ziona)
—	DF	ISR	Bar Ivgi (from Ironi Tiberias)
—	DF	ISR	Shalev Desta (on loan from Ironi Kiryat Shmona)
—	DF	ISR	Mor Naaman (from Hapoel Ramat Gan)
—	DF	ISR	Liam Hermash (on loan from Maccabi Haifa)
—	DF	ISR	Yonatan Laish (on loan from Maccabi Haifa)
—	DF	ISR	Dolev Azruel (from Maccabi Bnei Reineh)
—	MF	ISR	Evyatar Barak (from Ironi Tiberias)
—	MF	ISR	Amit Mor (from F.C. Dimona)
—	MF	FRA	Brahim Konaté (from (Lithuania) Kauno Žalgiris)
—	MF	ISR	Yarden Cohen (to F.C. Kiryat Yam)
—	MF	ISR	Raz Cohen (from Hapoel Ramat Gan)
—	FW	ISR	Mohammed Awadah (from F.C. Tzeirei Kafr Kanna)
—	FW	ISR	Nehorai Ifrach (on loan from Maccabi Haifa)
—	FW	FRA	Franck Rivollier (from (Belgium) Olympic Charleroi)
—	FW	ISR	Ziv Ben Shimol (on loan from Maccabi Haifa)

Out:

No.	Pos.	Nation	Player
—	GK	ISR	Golan Elkaslasy (to Hapoel Ramat HaSharon)
—	DF	ISR	Eran Azrad (Retired)
—	DF	ISR	Ronny Laufer (to Maccabi Petah Tikva, his player card still belongs to Maccabi Haifa)
—	DF	ISR	Ofek Nadir (to Hapoel Jerusalem)
—	DF	ISR	Roey Elimelech (loan return to Maccabi Haifa)
—	DF	ISR	Adar Azruel (to Hapoel Umm al-Fahm, his player card still belongs to Maccabi Haifa)
—	DF	GHA	David Acquah (Free agent)
—	MF	ISR	Avihay Wodaje (to Ironi Kiryat Shmona)
—	MF	ISR	Itay Tako (to Hapoel Acre)
—	MF	FRA	Sacha Petshi (to Hapoel Umm al-Fahm)
—	MF	ISR	Ilay Hagag (loan return to Maccabi Haifa)
—	MF	ISR	Yarden Cohen (Free agent)
—	MF	ISR	Ihab Abu Alshikh (to F.C. Kafr Qasim, loaned from Maccabi Haifa)
—	MF	ISR	Itay Atias (on loan to F.C. Tzeirei Kafr Kanna)
—	FW	ISR	Shahar Hirsh (to Bnei Yehuda)
—	FW	ISR	Neil Goldberg (Free agent)

=== Hapoel Kfar Saba ===
In:

No.	Pos.	Nation	Player
—	GK	ISR	Avihay Dahan (from Hapoel Rishon LeZion)
—	DF	GAM	Jarjue Abdoulie (from Hapoel Ramat HaSharon)
—	DF	ISR	Idan Weintraub (from Hapoel Herzliya)
—	DF	ISR	Daniel Mor Yosef (from Hapoel Acre)
—	DF	ISR	Omri Ben Harush (from Sektzia Ness Ziona)
—	DF	ISR	Ali Dahla (from F.C. Tzeirei Kafr Kanna)
—	DF	ISR	Raz Baruchian (on loan from Beitar Jerusalem)
—	MF	SUR	Roscello Vlijter (from (Cyprus) Peyia 2014)
—	MF	ISR	Shaked Navon (from Bnei Yehuda)
—	FW	UKR	Daniel Joulani (on loan from Maccabi Petah Tikva)
—	FW	COD	Éric Kabwe (from (Democratic Republic of the Congo) AS Vita Club)
—	FW	ISR	Dudu Biton (from Maccabi Jaffa)
—	FW	ISR	Roey Ben Shimon (on loan from Bnei Yehuda)
—	FW	GHA	Seth Kwaku Osei (from (Ghana) Hearts of Oak)
—	FW	ISR	Lior Inbrum (from Hapoel Kfar Saba)

Out:

No.	Pos.	Nation	Player
—	GK	ISR	Igal Becker (to (Cyprus) AEZ Zakakiou)
—	GK	ISR	Matan Galanti (on loan to Hapoel Herzliya)
—	DF	ISR	Shay Ben David (to Ironi Kriyat Shmona)
—	DF	ISR	Shahar Rosen (to Bnei Yehuda, his player card still belongs to Maccabi Tel Aviv)
—	DF	ISR	Tom Ahi Mordechai (to Hapoel Kfar Shalem, his player card still belongs to Hapoel Tel Aviv)
—	DF	ISR	Omer Yitzhak (loan return to Maccabi Tel Aviv)
—	DF	MDA	Artur Crăciun (to (Poland) Puszcza Niepołomice)
—	MF	ISR	Ilay Krispi (loan return to Hapoel Tel Aviv)
—	MF	GAM	Abubakar Barry (to Bnei Yehuda)
—	MF	ISR	Ohad Hazut (to Hapoel Acre)
—	MF	ISR	Itay Shor (to Hapoel Herzliya)
—	MF	ISR	Almog Ohayon (Free agent)
—	MF	ISR	Yoav Forian (on loan to Hapoel Herzliya)
—	MF	ISR	Omer Fadida (to Hapoel 1928 Kfar Saba)
—	FW	ISR	Stav Turiel (loan return to F.C. Ashdod)
—	FW	ISR	Yoel Abuhatzira (to Bnei Sakhnin)
—	FW	NGA	Odah Marshall (Free agent)

=== Hapoel Nof HaGalil ===
In:

No.	Pos.	Nation	Player
—	GK	ISR	Tomer Livitanov (from Maccabi Netanya)
—	GK	ISR	Doron Michaeli (loan return from F.C. Tzeirei Kafr Kanna)
—	DF	ISR	Ali Kayal (from Hapoel Acre)
—	DF	ISR	Salah Hussein (from Maccabi Akhi Nazareth)
—	DF	GAM	Sidiki Jawara (from (The Gambia) Samger)
—	DF	ISR	Dolev Azulay (from Maccabi Petah Tikva)
—	DF	ISR	Yarin Serdal (on loan from Hapoel Haifa)
—	DF	ISR	Tomer Lebanon (from F.C. Tzeirei Kafr Kanna)
—	MF	ISR	Karim Bal'oum (from F.C. Tzeirei Tayibe)
—	MF	ISR	Mohammed Mahamid (from Hapoel Umm al-Fahm)
—	MF	ISR	Ohad Rabinovich (from Hapoel Petah Tikva)
—	MF	ISR	Idan David (on loan from Beitar Jerusalem)
—	FW	ISR	Netanel Hagani (on loan from Hapoel Be'er Sheva)
—	FW	ISR	Ofir Mizrahi (from Ironi Tiberias)
—	FW	ISR	Ali Kna'ana (from Maccabi Akhi Nazareth)
—	FW	GUI	Alhassane Keita (from (Luxembourg) Mondorf-les-Bains)

Out:

No.	Pos.	Nation	Player
—	GK	ISR	Sagi Malul (to Hapoel Afula)
—	GK	ISR	Lidor Cohen (Free agent)
—	GK	ISR	Barak Levi (Free agent)
—	DF	BRA	Guti (to (Georgia (country)) FC Telavi)
—	DF	ISR	Alon Ginat (to Hapoel Ramat HaSharon)
—	DF	ISR	Valentin Matlis (to (Gibraltar) Manchester 62)
—	DF	ISR	Wesam Rabah (to Hapoel Ironi Arraba)
—	DF	ISR	Hagay Goldenberg (Free agent)
—	DF	ISR	Muatasem Issawi (Free agent)
—	MF	ISR	Eithan Velblum (to Ironi Tiberias)
—	MF	ISR	Maharan Radi (Free agent)
—	MF	LBR	David Tweh (to (Romania) Botoșani)
—	MF	ISR	Yarin Hatukai (on loan to F.C. Tzeirei Kafr Kanna)
—	FW	ISR	Waheb Habiballah (to Ironi Tiberias)
—	FW	ISR	Moti Malka (Free agent)
—	FW	NGA	Lanre Kehinde (Free agent)
—	FW	ISR	Oded Chekol (from Maccabi Haifa)
—	FW	ISR	Walid Darwish (to F.C. Tzeirei Umm al-Fahm)

=== Hapoel Ramat Gan ===
In:

No.	Pos.	Nation	Player
—	GK	ISR	Dor Hebron (from Hapoel Rishon LeZion)
—	GK	ISR	Tomer Alon (on loan from Maccabi Tel Aviv)
—	DF	ISR	Guy Aviv (from Hapoel Acre)
—	DF	ISR	Itay Ozeri (from Maccabi Petah Tikva)
—	DF	ISR	Amit Bitton (from Bnei Yehuda)
—	MF	ISR	Eyal Inbrum (on loan from Maccabi Petah Tikva)
—	MF	ISR	Dasalin Ayala (from F.C. Holon Yermiyahu)
—	MF	BRA	Léo Índio (on loan from (Romania) Politehnica Iași)
—	MF	ISR	Gidi Kanyuk (from Beitar Jerusalem)
—	FW	NGA	Goodnews Igbokwe (from (Armenia) FC Noah)
—	FW	ZAM	Richard Ngoma (on loan from Maccabi Netanya)

Out:

No.	Pos.	Nation	Player
—	GK	ISR	Matan Ambar (to Hapoel Rishon LeZion)
—	DF	ISR	Raz Nachmias (Free agent)
—	DF	ISR	Mor Naaman (to Hapoel Afula)
—	DF	ISR	Matan Levi (loan return to Maccabi Netanya)
—	DF	NGA	David Habila (Free agent)
—	MF	ISR	Raz Cohen (to Hapoel Afula)
—	MF	CMR	Martin Atemengue (loan return to F.C. Ashdod)
—	MF	ISR	Bentzi Moshel (to Hapoel Ashdod)
—	MF	ISR	Bashir Bajhat (to F.C. Tzeirei Umm al-Fahm)
—	MF	ISR	Or Dasa (to Hapoel Ramat Gan)
—	MF	ISR	Ismaeel Ryan (Free agent)
—	FW	SUR	Gleofilo Vlijter (to (Cyprus) Doxa Katokopias)
—	FW	ISR	Ben Mizan (Free agent)

=== Hapoel Ramat HaSharon ===
In:

No.	Pos.	Nation	Player
—	GK	ISR	Golan Elkaslasy (from Hapoel Afula)
—	GK	ISR	Ido Sharon (on loan from Hapoel Tel Aviv)
—	DF	ISR	Shon Edri (on loan from Maccabi Tel Aviv)
—	DF	ISR	Alon Ginat (from Hapoel Nof HaGalil)
—	MF	ISR	Niv Livnat (on loan from Maccabi Netanya)
—	MF	ISR	Dor Kochav (from Bnei Yehuda)
—	FW	ISR	Avraham Radai (from Hapoel Baqa al-Gharbiyye)
—	FW	COD	Kule Mbombo (from (Georgia (country)) Telavi)
—	FW	ISR	Amit Yeverbaum (from Hapoel Hadera)
—	FW	ISR	Shay Balahssan (from Bnei Yehuda)

Out:

No.	Pos.	Nation	Player
—	GK	ISR	Poraz Wolkovitz (to Maccabi Netanya)
—	GK	ISR	Golan Elkaslasy (to Hapoel Herzliya)
—	DF	GAM	Jarjue Abdoulie (to Hapoel Kfar Saba)
—	DF	ISR	Idan Ratta (to Bnei Yehuda)
—	DF	ISR	Ron Ben Dakon (Free agent)
—	MF	ISR	Roee David (to Maccabi Herzliya)
—	MF	PLE	Mohammed Abu Ras (to Ihud Bnei Shefa-'Amr)
—	MF	ISR	David Dego (to Ironi Kiryat Shmona, his player card still belongs to Beitar Jerusalem)
—	MF	ISR	Roee Rabinovich (to Maccabi Herzliya)
—	MF	ISR	Amit Leibovich (to Sporting Tel Aviv)
—	MF	ISR	Liroy Gabay (to Hapoel Marmorek)
—	MF	ISR	Hamza Mawassi (to Hapoel Umm al-Fahm)
—	FW	ISR	Netanel Hagani (to Hapoel Nof HaGalil, his player card still belongs to Hapoel Be'er Sheva)
—	FW	ISR	Eyal Abadi (to Shimshon Tel Aviv)
—	FW	ISR	Guy Amsalem (to Ironi Modi'in)
—	FW	ISR	Rom Alyagon (to Beitar Jerusalem, previously loaned from Hapoel Ramat HaSharon)

=== Hapoel Rishon LeZion ===
In:

No.	Pos.	Nation	Player
—	GK	ISR	Matan Ambar (from Hapoel Ramat Gan)
—	GK	ISR	Lior Gliklich (on loan from Hapoel Tel Aviv)
—	DF	ISR	Viki Kahlon (from Ironi Tiberias)
—	DF	ZAM	Gift Mphande (from (Zambia) Atletico Lusaka)
—	DF	ISR	Gal Kolani (from Maccabi Petah Tikva)
—	MF	ISR	Vladimir Broun (from F.C. Tzeirei Tayibe)
—	MF	ISR	Netanel Malka Peretz (from Beitar Tel Aviv)
—	MF	ISR	Ness Zamir (from Hapoel Hadera)
—	FW	ISR	Roy Fadida (from Hapoel Ashdod)
—	FW	UGA	Luwagga Kizito (from (Azerbaijan) Sabail)
—	FW	COD	Branham Kabala (on loan from Beitar Jerusalem)
—	FW	ISR	Ibrahim Badir (from F.C. Kafr Qasim)
—	FW	ISR	Yehonatan Levy (from Maccabi Petah Tikva)

Out:

No.	Pos.	Nation	Player
—	GK	ISR	Avihay Dahan (to Hapoel Kfar Saba)
—	GK	ISR	Dor Hebron (on loan to Hapoel Ramat Gan)
—	DF	ISR	Omri Luzon (to Hapoel Umm al-Fahm)
—	DF	ISR	Raz Baruchian (to Hapoel Kfar Saba, his player card still belongs to Beitar Jerusalem)
—	DF	ISR	Bar Netanel (to Maccabi Ironi Ashdod)
—	DF	ISR	Daniel Misezhnikov (to F.C. Holon Yermiyahu)
—	MF	ISR	Yair Nir (to Shimshon Tel Aviv)
—	MF	ISR	Ilay Tamam (to F.C. Ashdod)
—	MF	ISR	Yuval Haliva (to Shimshon Tel Aviv)
—	MF	SLE	Emmanuel Samadia (Free agent)
—	FW	ISR	Ronen Hanchis (to Maccabi Jaffa, his player card still belongs to Maccabi Tel Aviv)
—	FW	ISR	Gal Katabi (Free agent)
—	FW	ISR	Ohad Barzilay (to Hapoel Hadera)

=== Hapoel Umm al-Fahm ===
In:

No.	Pos.	Nation	Player
—	GK	ISR	Arik Yanko (from Maccabi Bnei Reineh)
—	GK	ISR	Yoav Arikha (from F.C. Ashdod)
—	DF	ISR	Omri Luzon (from Hapoel Rishon LeZion)
—	DF	ISR	Liad Levi (on loan from Maccabi Haifa)
—	MF	ISR	Tambi Sagas (from F.C. Kafr Qasim)
—	MF	FRA	Sacha Petshi (from Hapoel Afula)
—	MF	ISR	Hamza Mawassi (from Hapoel Ramat HaSharon)
—	FW	ISR	Noaf Bazea (from Hapoel Jerusalem)
—	FW	ISR	Ala'a Agbaria (from Hapoel Bnei Zalafa)
—	FW	ISR	Dovev Gabay (from Maccabi Jaffa)
—	FW	ISR	Amit Zenati (from Maccabi Bnei Reineh)
—	FW	SRB	Nikola Terzić (on loan from (Serbia) FK Partizan)
—	FW	ISR	Ben Azubel (from Hapoel Jerusalem)

Out:

No.	Pos.	Nation	Player
—	GK	ISR	Tal Bomshtein (to Ironi Tiberias)
—	GK	ISR	Amer Jabarin (to Hapoel Bnei Musmus)
—	DF	ISR	Michael Chilaka (to (United States) San Diego Loyal, previously loaned from Maccabi Tel Aviv)
—	DF	ISR	Muhammad Othman (to F.C. Tzeirei Umm al-Fahm)
—	DF	ISR	Ben Azar Cohen (to F.C. Tzeirei Tayibe)
—	MF	ISR	Mohammed Mahamid (to Hapoel Nof HaGalil)
—	MF	GHA	Issac Nortey (to (Romania) CFR Cluj)
—	MF	ISR	Solomon Daniel (to Bnei Yehuda)
—	FW	ISR	Gil Itzhak (to Maccabi Jaffa)
—	FW	ISR	Anas Mahamid (to Maccabi Petah Tikva)
—	FW	ISR	Mohammad Khatib (to Ironi Kiryat Shmona)
—	FW	PLE	Alaa Al-Din Hassan (to Bnei Sakhnin)
—	FW	CIV	Mohammed Bamba (to (Austria) Wolfsberger AC)

=== Ihud Bnei Shefa-'Amr ===
In:

No.	Pos.	Nation	Player
—	GK	ISR	Yossi Ginzburg (from Sektzia Ness Ziona)
—	DF	ISR	Ofek Fishler (from Hapoel Petah Tikva)
—	DF	ISR	Haim Izrin (from Hapoel Petah Tikva)
—	DF	CIV	Doueugui Mala (from F.C. Kafr Qasim)
—	DF	ISR	Ali Abbas (on loan from Maccabi Bnei Reineh)
—	MF	ISR	Moha Badir (from Hapoel Petah Tikva)
—	MF	NGA	Jerry Akose (from Maccabi Ata Bialik)
—	MF	ISR	Mohammed Abu Ras (from Hapoel Ramat HaSharon)
—	MF	BRA	Daniel Farias (from (United Arab Emirates) Baynounah)
—	FW	ISR	Amer Al-Dadah (from F.C. Kafr Qasim)
—	FW	ISR	Karem Arshid (from Hapoel Acre)
—	FW	ISR	Idan Shemesh (from Hapoel Petah Tikva)
—	FW	ISR	Jubayer Bushnak (on loan from Hapoel Haifa)

Out:

No.	Pos.	Nation	Player
—	DF	ISR	Amit Bar (Free agent)
—	DF	ISR	Fadi Armeli (to F.C. Tzeirei Kafr Kanna)
—	DF	ISR	Sharon Levy (to F.C. Tzeirei Umm al-Fahm)
—	DF	ISR	Rami Miazna (to F.C. Kiryat Yam)
—	MF	ISR	Aviran Turgeman (Retired)
—	MF	ISR	Rajeb Khalil (to Maccabi Nujeidat)
—	MF	ISR	Mohammed Fukura (Free agent)

=== Ironi Kiryat Shmona ===
In:

No.	Pos.	Nation	Player
—	GK	ISR	Matan Zalmanovic (from Hapoel Ashdod)
—	DF	ISR	Dudu Twito (from Hapoel Haifa)
—	DF	ISR	Shay Ben David (from Hapoel Kfar Saba)
—	DF	ISR	Ziv Leigh (from Maccabi Haifa)
—	MF	ISR	Avihay Wodaje (from Hapoel Afula)
—	MF	ISR	David Dego (on loan from Beitar Jerusalem)
—	MF	PAN	Alfredo Stephens (from (Venezuela) Academia Puerto Cabello)
—	FW	ISR	Mohammad Khatib (from Hapoel Umm al-Fahm)
—	FW	NGA	Evo Ememe (from (Malta) Mosta)
—	FW	ISR	Roei Zikri (from Hapoel Petah Tikva)
—	FW	ISR	Guy Ben Lulu (loan return from Hapoel Acre)

Out:

No.	Pos.	Nation	Player
—	GK	LTU	Džiugas Bartkus (to (Saudi Arabia) Al-Orobah)
—	GK	ISR	Nadav Zamir (to Hapoel Jerusalem)
—	DF	ISR	Shalev Desta (on loan to Hapoel Afula)
—	DF	ISR	Itay Ben Shabat (to Maccabi Netanya)
—	DF	ISR	Ziv Morgan (on loan to (Romania) CFR Cluj)
—	DF	ISR	Nir Drori (to Hapoel Acre)
—	MF	ISR	Yadin Lugasi (to (Azerbaijan) Sabail)
—	MF	ISR	Roi Kahat (to (Azerbaijan) Sumgayit FK)
—	MF	ISR	Samuel Broun (to Hapoel Petah Tikva)
—	MF	ISR	Yoav Hofmayster (to (Poland) Korona Kielce)
—	FW	ISR	Mohammed Shaker (on loan to Bnei Sakhnin)
—	FW	BRA	Marlon Santos (Free agent)
—	FW	ISR	Timothy Muzie (to Beitar Jerusalem, previously loaned from Maccabi Haifa)
—	FW	BLR	Ivan Bakhar (to (Belarus) Dinamo Minsk)
—	FW	CIV	Senin Sebai (to (Tajikistan) Istiklol)
—	FW	ISR	Itamar Shviro (to Maccabi Netanya)

=== Ironi Tiberias ===
In:

No.	Pos.	Nation	Player
—	GK	ISR	Tal Bomshtein (from Hapoel Umm al-Fahm)
—	GK	ISR	Dan Drori (from Maccabi Akhi Nazareth)
—	DF	ISR	Namir Aga (from Maccabi Bnei Reineh)
—	DF	ISR	Shay Konstantini (from Maccabi Netanya)
—	MF	ISR	Yaniv Brik (from Maccabi Bnei Reineh)
—	MF	ISR	Ron Appelbaum (from Beitar Nes Tubruk)
—	MF	ISR	Snir Talias (from Hapoel Haifa, previously loaned)
—	MF	ISR	Eithan Velblum (from Hapoel Nof HaGalil)
—	MF	ISR	Shon Weiss (from Hapoel Ashdod)
—	MF	ARG	Franco Mazurek (from (Azerbaijan) Sabail)
—	FW	ISR	Waheb Habiballah (from Hapoel Nof HaGalil)
—	FW	ISR	Sapir Razon (from Maccabi Haifa)
—	FW	ISR	Omer Buaron (from Hapoel Kfar Shalem)
—	FW	ISR	Ahmed Abed (from Maccabi Bnei Reineh)

Out:

No.	Pos.	Nation	Player
—	GK	ISR	Tomer Livitanov (to Hapoel Nof HaGalil, previously loaned from Maccabi Netanya)
—	GK	ISR	Daniel Benish (to F.C. Kiryat Yam)
—	DF	ISR	Bar Ivgi (to Ironi Tiberias)
—	DF	ISR	Viki Kahlon (to Hapoel Rishon LeZion)
—	DF	ISR	Ori Tza'adon (to Sektzia Ness Ziona)
—	DF	ISR	Haroun Shapso (Free agent)
—	DF	ISR	Miki Yazo (Free agent)
—	MF	ISR	Matanel Tadesa (to Bnei Sakhnin)
—	MF	ISR	Evyatar Barak (to Hapoel Afula)
—	FW	ISR	Ofir Mizrahi (to Hapoel Nof HaGalil)
—	FW	ISR	Nir Abergil (to F.C. Kafr Qasim)
—	FW	ISR	Aviel Gabai (Retired)
—	FW	ISR	Timor Avitan (Free agent)
—	FW	ISR	Idan Golan (to (Romania) FC Buzău)
—	FW	ISR	Nehorai Ifrach (to Hapoel Afula, his player card still belongs to Maccabi Haifa)
—	FW	ISR	Nir Dueb (on loan to Hapoel Kafr Kanna)

=== Maccabi Herzliya ===
In:

No.	Pos.	Nation	Player
—	GK	ISR	Omer Kabilio (from Hapoel Jerusalem)
—	DF	ISR	Amir Rustum (from Maccabi Akhi Nazareth)
—	DF	ISR	Sean Klimkin (from Hapoel Marmorek)
—	DF	CIV	Abdoul Coulibaly (on loan from Hapoel Be'er Sheva)
—	MF	ISR	Ofek Ovadia (from Hapoel Kfar Shalem)
—	MF	CIV	Sékou Doumbia (from (Kazakhstan) Maktaaral)
—	MF	ISR	Roee David (from Hapoel Ramat HaSharon)
—	MF	ISR	Eylon Yerushalmi (from Sektzia Ness Ziona)
—	MF	ISR	Roee Rabinovich (from Hapoel Ramat HaSharon)
—	FW	NGA	Steven Alfred (from Hapoel Hadera)
—	FW	ISR	Amit Mizrahi (from Hapoel Migdal HaEmek)

Out:

No.	Pos.	Nation	Player
—	GK	ISR	Ben Musayof (to Hapoel Lod)
—	DF	ISR	Ben Grabli (to Ironi Modi'in)
—	MF	ISR	Nico Olsak (Retired)
—	MF	ISR	Stav Nesikovsky (to F.C. HaMekhtesh Givatayim)
—	MF	ISR	Daniel Schwarzboim (to Hapoel Baqa al-Gharbiyye)
—	MF	ISR	Ori Eshel (to Hapoel Ra'anana)
—	MF	ISR	Niv Alfi (to Nordia Jerusalem)
—	FW	ISR	Tom Madhele (to Maccabi Sha'arayim)
—	MF	ISR	Yair Shpungin (Free agent)
—	FW	ISR	Eial Strahman (Free agent)
—	FW	ISR	Oded Biro (Free agent)
—	FW	ISR	Yehonatan Sigauker (to Shimshon Tel Aviv)

=== Maccabi Jaffa ===
In:

No.	Pos.	Nation	Player
—	GK	ISR	Adi Nesse (from Hapoel Marmorek)
—	DF	CIV	Cheikh Mamadou Diabaté (from Maccabi Petah Tikva)
—	DF	ISR	Gal Mayo (from Maccabi Petah Tikva)
—	DF	ISR	Shalev Semerli (from Hapoel Herzliya)
—	DF	ISR	Uri Magbo (from Sektzia Ness Ziona)
—	DF	ISR	Elad Ashram (from Hapoel Marmorek)
—	DF	ISR	Amit Cohen (from Beitar Jerusalem)
—	MF	ISR	Sali Ganon (on loan from Hapoel Be'er Sheva)
—	MF	ISR	Eli Meger (from Gadna Tel Aviv Yehuda)
—	FW	ISR	Gil Itzhak (from Hapoel Umm al-Fahm)
—	FW	ISR	Hayford Adjei (from Shimshon Kafr Qasim)
—	FW	ISR	Yakir Zilberman (from Maccabi Tel Aviv)
—	FW	ISR	Ronen Hanchis (on loan from Maccabi Tel Aviv)
—	FW	ISR	Fadil Zbedat (on loan from Bnei Sakhnin)
—	FW	ISR	David Tzur (from F.C. Jerusalem)

Out:

No.	Pos.	Nation	Player
—	GK	ISR	Gal Navon (to F.C. Dimona)
—	DF	ISR	Niv Fliter (to Hapoel Be'er Sheva)
—	DF	ISR	Guy Mishpati (Free agent)
—	DF	ISR	Phillip Hayek (Free agent)
—	DF	ISR	Triko Gatehun (Free agent)
—	DF	ISR	Liel Biton (Free agent)
—	DF	ISR	Bar Shushan (to Nordia Jerusalem)
—	DF	ISR	Daniel Engel (on loan to Maccabi Kiryat Malakhi)
—	DF	ISR	Jonathan Paz (Free agent)
—	DF	ISR	Itzik Shoolmayster (Free agent)
—	MF	ISR	Yasmao Cabeda (to Hapoel Haifa)
—	MF	ISR	Nicolas Ledesman (to Nordia Jerusalem)
—	MF	ISR	Gal Levi (Free agent)
—	MF	ISR	Ben Rozilio (on loan to F.C. Holon Yermiyahu)
—	FW	ISR	Dudu Biton (to Hapoel Kfar Saba)
—	FW	ISR	Dovev Gabay (to Hapoel Umm al-Fahm)
—	FW	POR	Jucie Lupeta (to (South Korea) Bucheon FC 1995)
—	FW	GUI	Ibrahima Conté (Free agent)
—	FW	ISR	Nuriel Buzaglo (to Maccabi Kiryat Malakhi)

=== Sektzia Ness Ziona ===
In:

No.	Pos.	Nation	Player
—	GK	ISR	Danny Amos (from Maccabi Petah Tikva)
—	DF	ISR	Amir Ben Shimon (from F.C. Kafr Qasim)
—	DF	ISR	Ilay Tomer (on loan from Maccabi Tel Aviv)
—	DF	ISR	Ori Tza'adon (from Ironi Tiberias)
—	DF	ISR	Netanel Amoyal (from Bnei Yehuda)
—	MF	ISR	Ben Khawaz (from F.C. Kafr Qasim)
—	MF	ISR	Amir Agayev (from Bnei Yehuda)
—	MF	ISR	Yoav Gabizon (on loan from Hapoel Ramat Gan)
—	MF	ISR	Lior Berkovich (from Hapoel Petah Tikva)
—	MF	ISR	Dan Kaduri (on loan from Maccabi Petah Tikva)
—	MF	NGA	Joseph Adah (from (Belarus) Dinamo Minsk)
—	FW	ISR	Yanai David (from Bnei Eilat)
—	FW	NGA	Benjamin Kuku (from Maccabi Akhi Nazareth)
—	FW	ISR	Eden Hershkovitz (from F.C. Kafr Qasim)
—	FW	ISR	Eli Elbaz (from Maccabi Ironi Ashdod)
—	FW	SVK	Jakub Sylvestr (from (Poland) Resovia)
—	FW	ISR	Sean Buskila (from F.C. Jerusalem)
—	FW	ZAM	Chipyoka Songa (from (Zambia) ZESCO United)

Out:

No.	Pos.	Nation	Player
—	GK	ISR	Niv Antman (to Hapoel Haifa)
—	GK	ISR	Yossi Ginzburg (to Ihud Bnei Shefa-'Amr)
—	DF	ISR	Stav Israeli (to Bnei Yehuda)
—	DF	ISR	Tal Kachila (to Hapoel Afula)
—	DF	ISR	Uri Magbo (to Maccabi Jaffa)
—	DF	ISR	Omri Ben Harush (to Hapoel Kfar Saba)
—	DF	CIV	Stephane Acka (to (Azerbaijan) Zira FK)
—	MF	ISR	Yoni Stoyanov (loan return to Hapoel Be'er Sheva)
—	MF	NGA	Muhammed Usman Edu (to Maccabi Bnei Reineh)
—	MF	ISR	Dor Kochav (to Bnei Yehuda)
—	MF	ISR	Ilay Trost (to Hapoel Hadera)
—	MF	ISR	Eylon Yerushalmi (to Maccabi Herzliya)
—	MF	ITA	Cristian Battocchio (to (India) Chennaiyin)
—	MF	ISR	Yoav Gabizon (Free agent)
—	FW	BRA	Ari Moura (to (Ukraine) Metalist 1925 Kharkiv, his player card still belongs to (Brazil) Atlético Metropolitano)
—	FW	ISR	Or Roizman (to Hapoel Jerusalem, his player card still belongs to Maccabi Tel Aviv)
—	FW	GEO	Levan Kutalia (to (Armenia) FC Alashkert)
—	FW	COL	Bladimir Díaz (Free agent)
—	FW	ISR	Almog Buzaglo (to Bnei Yehuda)
—	FW	ISR	Mor Fadida (Free agent)
—	FW	NGA	Benjamin Kuku (Free agent)
—	FW	ISR	Eli Elbaz (Free agent)
—	FW	ISR	Lior Inbrum (to Hapoel Kfar Saba)

.
