= List of Israeli football transfers winter 2023–24 =

This is a list of Israeli football transfers for the 2023–24 winter transfer window.

== Ligat Ha'Al ==
=== Beitar Jerusalem ===
In:

No.	Pos.	Nation	Player
—	DF	ISR	Zohar Zasno (from F.C. Ashdod)
—	DF	BUL	Plamen Galabov (from Maccabi Netanya)
—	FW	GEO	Nika Khorkheli (on loan from (Georgia (country)) Samgurali Tsqaltubo)
—	FW	ISR	Roey Ben Shimon (from Hapoel Kfar Saba)

Out:

No.	Pos.	Nation	Player
—	GK	ISR	Netanel Daloya (to Hapoel Kfar Saba)
—	DF	ISR	Liel Deri (on loan to Hapoel Ra'anana)
—	MF	MNE	Deni Hočko (Free agent)
—	MF	CIV	Trazié Thomas (on loan to (Turkey) Kasımpaşa)
—	MF	ISR	Amir Berkovits (on loan to Hapoel Hadera)

=== Bnei Sakhnin ===
In:

No.	Pos.	Nation	Player
—	DF	ISR	Ido Vaier (from Maccabi Netanya)
—	DF	ISR	Itay Ben Hemo (on loan from Maccabi Tel Aviv)
—	DF	CYP	Constantinos Soteriou (from (Cyprus) AEL Limassol)
—	MF	ISR	Ilay Elmkies (Free transfer)
—	FW	ISR	Abdallah Khlaikhal (Free transfer)
—	FW	ISR	Joseph Ganda (from F.C. Ashdod)

Out:

No.	Pos.	Nation	Player
—	GK	GUA	Nicholas Hagen (Free agent)
—	DF	MNE	Ilija Martinović (to (Serbia) Spartak Subotica)
—	DF	ISR	Yazan Nassar (to Ihud Bnei Shefa-'Amr)
—	MF	ISR	Noor Aladeen Othman (to Maccabi Bnei Reineh)
—	FW	CUW	Rangelo Janga (to (Cyprus) Nea Salamis Famagusta)
—	FW	ISR	Yoel Abuhatzira (to Ihud Bnei Shefa-'Amr)
—	FW	PLE	Alaa Aldeen Hassan (to (Qatar) Al-Arabi)

=== F.C. Ashdod ===
In:

No.	Pos.	Nation	Player
—	DF	ISR	Zohar Zasno (from Beitar Jerusalem)
—	DF	ISR	Omri Ben Harush (from Hapoel Kfar Saba)
—	FW	ISR	Joseph Ganda (Free transfer)
—	FW	NGA	Ezekiel Henty (from (Cyprus) AEL Limassol)
—	FW	ISR	Stav Nahmani (on loan from Maccabi Haifa)

Out:

No.	Pos.	Nation	Player
—	DF	ISR	Obeida Hattab (to Maccabi Petah Tikva)
—	DF	ISR	David Cuperman (to Hapoel Tel Aviv)
—	MF	ISR	Stav Turiel (to Hapoel Tel Aviv)
—	MF	BRA	Lucas Salinas (Free agent)
—	FW	ISR	Shavit Mazal (to Bnei Yehuda)
—	FW	ISR	Joseph Ganda (to Bnei Sakhnin)

=== Hapoel Be'er Sheva ===
In:

No.	Pos.	Nation	Player
—	DF	ISR	Máximo Levi (from (Argentina) Defensores de Belgrano)
—	DF	ISR	Or Dadia (loan return from (Scotland) Aberdeen)
—	FW	COL	Deinner Quiñones (from (Colombia) Atlético Nacional)
—	FW	KAZ	Artur Shushenachev (from (Kazakhstan) Kairat)

Out:

No.	Pos.	Nation	Player
—	DF	ISR	Muatasem Issawi (to Ironi Nesher)
—	DF	ISR	Niv Fliter (on loan to Maccabi Bnei Reineh)
—	MF	ISR	Roi Maman (on loan to Hapoel Kfar Saba)
—	FW	SWE	Kristoffer Peterson (Free agent)
—	FW	POL	Patryk Klimala (to (Poland) Śląsk Wrocław)
—	FW	ISR	Tomer Hemed (to Maccabi Haifa)
—	FW	KOS	Astrit Selmani (to (Romania) Dinamo București)

=== Hapoel Hadera ===
In:

No.	Pos.	Nation	Player
—	DF	CRO	Josip Tomašević (from (Greece) Anagennisi Karditsa)
—	DF	SEN	Mamadou Mbodj (from (Kazakhstan) Ordabasy)
—	MF	ISR	Ruslan Barsky (from (Bosnia and Herzegovina) Borac Banja Luka)
—	MF	ISR	Amir Berkovits (on loan from Beitar Jerusalem)
—	FW	ISR	Yoav Tomer (Free transfer)
—	FW	NGA	James Adeniyi (from (Turkey) Tuzlaspor)
—	FW	GHA	Godsway Donyoh (from (Cyprus) Apollon Limassol)

Out:

No.	Pos.	Nation	Player
—	DF	ISR	Sapir Itah (to Bnei Yehuda)
—	DF	CIV	Kouya Mabea (to Hapoel Rishon LeZion)
—	FW	ISR	Dor Jan (to Maccabi Herzliya)
—	FW	ISR	Ohad Barzilay (to Hapoel Afula)
—	FW	BEL	Aaron Leya Iseka (to (Greece) OFI Crete, previously loaned from (England) Barnsley)
—	FW	ISR	Orel Baye (to Hapoel Rishon LeZion, his player card still belongs to Maccabi Tel Aviv)
—	FW	ISR	Yoav Tomer (to Hapoel Rishon LeZion)

=== Hapoel Haifa ===
In:

No.	Pos.	Nation	Player
—	FW	BLR	Dmitry Antilevsky (from (Belarus) BATE Borisov)

Out:

No.	Pos.	Nation	Player
—	FW	ISR	Shoval Gozlan (to Hapoel Petah Tikva)

=== Hapoel Jerusalem ===
In:

No.	Pos.	Nation	Player
—	FW	ISR	Ohad Almagor (from Hapoel Rishon LeZion)

Out:

No.	Pos.	Nation	Player
—	DF	ISR	Amir Ariely (to Hapoel Acre, his player card still belongs to Hapoel Be'er Sheva)
—	DF	CZE	Ondřej Bačo (to (Hungary) Diósgyőri VTK)
—	MF	ISR	Itay Zada (on loan to Ironi Tiberias)
—	MF	ISR	Lior Kasa (to Maccabi Haifa)

=== Hapoel Petah Tikva ===
In:

No.	Pos.	Nation	Player
—	GK	ISR	Raz Karmi (from Maccabi Netanya)
—	DF	AUT	Nico Antonitsch (from (Germany) SV Elversberg)
—	MF	ISR	Hamza Shibli (on loan from Maccabi Haifa)
—	MF	ENG	Dennis Adeniran (on loan from (Portugal) Portimonense)
—	FW	ISR	Shoval Gozlan (from Hapoel Haifa)

Out:

No.	Pos.	Nation	Player
—	GK	GRE	Nikos Giannakopoulos (Free agent)
—	DF	POR	André Teixeira (to (Greece) A.E. Kifisia)
—	MF	GHA	Richard Boateng (Free agent)

=== Hapoel Tel Aviv ===
In:

No.	Pos.	Nation	Player
—	DF	ISR	Raz Meir (from (Netherlands) RKC Waalwijk)
—	DF	ISR	Ziv Morgan (from Ironi Kiryat Shmona, previously loaned to CFR Cluj)
—	DF	ISR	David Cuperman (from F.C. Ashdod)
—	MF	ISR	Elian Rohana (from Hapoel Kfar Saba)
—	MF	ISR	Stan Turiel (from F.C. Ashdod)
—	MF	ISR	Ihab Ghanayem (from (Kazakhstan) Aktobe)
—	FW	GAM	Bubacarr Tambedou (from (Estonia) Paide Linnameeskond)

Out:

No.	Pos.	Nation	Player
—	DF	UGA	Aziz Kayondo (loan return to (Spain) CD Leganés B)
—	DF	ISR	Alon Azugi (to Maccabi Petah Tikva)
—	DF	ISR	Yahav Gurfinkel (to (China) Chengdu Rongcheng)
—	DF	ISR	Aviv Salem (to Maccabi Petah Tikva)
—	MF	ISR	Roei Alkukin (on loan to Maccabi Herzliya)
—	MF	ISR	Ari Cohen (on loan to Hapoel Kfar Saba)
—	MF	FRA	Noam Bonnet (on loan to Hapoel Acre)
—	MF	ESP	José Rodríguez (to (Turkey) Adana Demirspor)
—	MF	ISR	Daniel David Tzadik (on loan to Hapoel Rishon LeZion)
—	FW	ISR	Gabriel Segal (loan return to (United States) New York City)
—	FW	ISR	Ido Elmshily (on loan to F.C. Kafr Qasim)

=== Maccabi Bnei Reineh ===
In:

No.	Pos.	Nation	Player
—	DF	ISR	Mor Barami (Free transfer)
—	DF	ISR	Niv Fliter (on loan from Hapoel Be'er Sheva)
—	MF	ISR	Noor Aladeen Othman (from Bnei Sakhnin)
—	FW	PAN	Freddy Góndola (from (Costa Rica) Alajuelense)
—	FW	ISR	Nawaf Bazea (Free transfer)

Out:

No.	Pos.	Nation	Player
—	DF	ISR	Dor Elo (Free agent)
—	MF	ISR	Marwan Kabha (to Maccabi Jaffa)

=== Maccabi Haifa ===
In:

No.	Pos.	Nation	Player
—	GK	ISR	Nitay Greis (loan return from Hapoel Afula)
—	MF	ISR	Kenny Saief (from (Azerbaijan) Neftçi)
—	MF	ISR	Gadi Kinda (from (United States) Sporting Kansas City)
—	MF	ISR	Lior Kasa (from Hapoel Jerusalem)
—	FW	ISR	Ziv Ben Shimol (loan return from Hapoel Afula)
—	FW	ISR	Tomer Hemed (from Hapoel Be'er Sheva)
—	FW	RUS	Daniil Lesovoy (on loan from (Russia) Dynamo Moscow)
—	FW	ISR	Stav Nahmani (loan return from (Scotland) St. Mirren)

Out:

No.	Pos.	Nation	Player
—	GK	ISR	Mohammed Amer (on loan to Hapoel Migdal HaEmek)
—	MF	SUR	Tjaronn Chery (on loan to (Netherlands) Nijmegen)
—	MF	ISR	Hamza Shibli (on loan to Hapoel Petah Tikva)
—	MF	ISR	Dia Saba (on loan to (United Arab Emirates) Emirates Club)
—	FW	ISR	Binyamin Tzaga (on loan to Hapoel Kfar Shalem)

=== Maccabi Netanya ===
In:

No.	Pos.	Nation	Player
—	GK	ISR	Omer Nir'on (on loan from Bnei Yehuda)
—	DF	GEO	Saba Khvadagiani (from (Georgia (country)) Dinamo Tbilisi)
—	FW	GHA	Ibrahim Tanko (from (Serbia) Javor Ivanjica)

Out:

No.	Pos.	Nation	Player
—	GK	ISR	Poraz Volkowich (on loan to Hapoel Kfar Shalem)
—	GK	ISR	Raz Karmi (to Hapoel Petah Tikva)
—	DF	ISR	Ido Vaier (to Bnei Sakhnin)
—	DF	BUL	Plamen Galabov (to Beitar Jerusalem)
—	MF	ISR	Barak Anglister (to Ihud Bnei Shefa-'Amr)
—	MF	ISR	Moshe Mula (on loan to Hapoel Kfar Shalem)
—	FW	CRC	Rachid Chirino (on loan to Hapoel Umm al-Fahm)
—	FW	ZAM	Richard Ngoma (Free agent)

=== Maccabi Petah Tikva ===
In:

No.	Pos.	Nation	Player
—	DF	ISR	Alon Azugi (from Hapoel Tel Aviv)
—	DF	ISR	Obeida Hattab (from F.C. Ashdod)
—	DF	CYP	Andreas Karo (from (Greece) OFI Crete)
—	DF	ISR	Aviv Salem (from Hapoel Tel Aviv)
—	MF	NGA	Lawrence Nicholas (from (Turkey) Fatih Karagümrük)
—	FW	SVN	Luka Štor (from (Slovenia) Bravo)

Out:

No.	Pos.	Nation	Player
—	DF	CIV	Cheikh Mamadou Diabaté (to (Austria) Wolfsberger AC, his player card still belongs to Maccabi Jaffa)
—	MF	ISR	Moti Barshazki (to Bnei Yehuda)
—	MF	GHA	Gideon Akaouwa (to Ironi Tiberias)
—	FW	COD	Jared Khasa (Free agent)
—	FW	ISR	Amir Altoury (on loan to Hapoel Rishon LeZion)

=== Maccabi Tel Aviv ===
In:

No.	Pos.	Nation	Player
—	GK	ISR	Tomer Alon (loan return from Maccabi Tel Aviv)
—	DF	ISR	Matan Baltaxa (from (Austria) Austrian Wien)
—	DF	ISR	Raz Shlomo (from (Belgium) OH Leuven)
—	MF	ISR	Eden Karzev (on loan from (Turkey) İstanbul Başakşehir)
—	FW	ISR	Yonas Malede (from (Belgium) Mechelen)
—	FW	GHA	Henry Addo (from (Slovakia) Žilina)

Out:

No.	Pos.	Nation	Player
—	DF	FRA	Yvann Maçon (loan return to (France) Saint-Étienne)
—	FW	ISR	Sayed Abu Farchi (on loan to F.C. Kafr Qasim)

== Liga Leumit ==
=== Bnei Yehuda ===
In:

No.	Pos.	Nation	Player
—	DF	ISR	Sapir Itah (from Hapoel Hadera)
—	MF	ISR	Moti Barshazki (from Maccabi Petah Tikva)
—	MF	NGA	Joseph Okoro (from (Tajikistan) Istiklol)
—	FW	ISR	Michael Maman (from Hapoel Umm al-Fahm)
—	FW	ISR	Shavit Mazal (from F.C. Ashdod)
—	FW	ISR	Hayford Adjei (from Maccabi Jaffa)

Out:

No.	Pos.	Nation	Player
—	DF	ISR	Guy Hakim (on loan to Ironi Modi'in)
—	DF	ISR	Yogev Lerman (to Hapoel Herzliya)
—	DF	ISR	Tamir Haimovich (on loan to Hapoel Kfar Shalem)
—	MF	ISR	Ronen Gerdashov (on loan to Hapoel Ramat HaSharon)
—	MF	ISR	Shay Ayzen (to Hapoel Rishon LeZion)
—	MF	CIV	Claude Kouakou (to Hapoel Ramat HaSharon)
—	FW	ISR	Yaniv Mizrahi (to Hapoel Ramat Gan, his player card still belongs to Maccabi Netanya)

=== F.C. Kafr Qasim ===
In:

No.	Pos.	Nation	Player
—	FW	ISR	Sayed Abu Farchi (on loan from Maccabi Tel Aviv)
—	FW	ISR	Ido Elmshily (on loan from Hapoel Tel Aviv)

Out:

No.	Pos.	Nation	Player
—	GK	ISR	Yonatan Ozer (to Hapoel Afula)
—	DF	ISR	Gil Sellam (to F.C. Kiryat Yam)
—	MF	ISR	Sean Malka (to Sektzia Ness Ziona)
—	MF	ISR	Mohammed Badir (Free agent)

=== Hapoel Acre ===
In:

No.	Pos.	Nation	Player
—	DF	ISR	Amir Ariely (on loan from Hapoel Be'er Sheva)
—	MF	FRA	Noam Bonnet (on loan from Hapoel Tel Aviv)
—	FW	ISR	Netanel Hagani (Free transfer)
—	FW	GUY	Morgan Ferrier (from (United Arab Emirates) Al Urooba)

Out:

No.	Pos.	Nation	Player
—	DF	SRB	Stefan Vilotić (to (Czech Republic) MFK Chrudim)
—	DF	ISR	Tanos Bana (to Maccabi Akhi Nazareth)
—	MF	ISR	Anes Dabour (to Ihud Bnei Shefa-'Amr)
—	MF	ISR	Inan Gonzalez (on loan to Hapoel Karmiel)
—	MF	ISR	Itamar Munka (on loan to Hapoel Karmiel)
—	FW	GEO	Giorgi Gabedava (Free agent)
—	FW	ISR	Shahaf Sapir (on loan to F.C. Kiryat Yam)

=== Hapoel Afula ===
In:

No.	Pos.	Nation	Player
—	GK	ISR	Yonatan Ozer (from F.C. Kafr Qasim)
—	MF	ISR	Daniel Seneor (from Hapoel Kfar Saba)
—	MF	NGA	Gavi Thompson (from (Lithuania) FC Hegelmann)
—	MF	ISR	Liav Preda (from Hapoel Nof HaGalil)
—	FW	ISR	Ohad Barzilay (from Hapoel Hadera)
—	FW	ISR	Iyad Haj (from Hapoel Kfar Saba)

Out:

No.	Pos.	Nation	Player
—	GK	ISR	Nitay Greis (loan return to Maccabi Haifa)
—	DF	ISR	Tal Kachila (to Hapoel Umm al-Fahm)
—	MF	ISR	Amit Mor (to F.C. Tira)
—	MF	ISR	Ziv Ben Shimol (loan return to Maccabi Haifa)
—	FW	ISR	Mohammed Awadah (loan return to Tzeirei Kafr Kanna)

=== Hapoel Kfar Saba ===
In:

No.	Pos.	Nation	Player
—	GK	ISR	Netanel Daloya (from Beitar Jerusalem)
—	GK	ISR	Dor Hebron (on loan from Maccabi Petah Tikva)
—	DF	ISR	Ofek Fishler (from Ihud Bnei Shefa-'Amr)
—	DF	ISR	Hagay Goldenberg (Free transfer)
—	MF	ISR	Ari Cohen (on loan from Hapoel Tel Aviv)
—	MF	ISR	Roi Maman (on loan from Hapoel Be'er Sheva)
—	MF	ISR	Mustapha Sheikh Yosef (from Ihud Bnei Shefa-'Amr)
—	MF	LBR	David Tweh (Free transfer)
—	FW	NGA	Benjamin Kuku (Free transfer)
—	FW	PLE	Ali El-Khatib (from Ihud Bnei Shefa-'Amr)
—	FW	ISR	Ronen Hanchis (on loan from Maccabi Tel Aviv)
—	FW	ISR	Roy Fadida (Free transfer)
—	FW	ISR	Alon Buzorgi (from Hapoel Nof HaGalil)

Out:

No.	Pos.	Nation	Player
—	GK	ISR	Avihay Dahan (to Shimshon Tel Aviv)
—	DF	ISR	Idan Weintraub (to Ironi Modi'in)
—	DF	ISR	Ali Dahla (to F.C. Tzeirei Tayibe)
—	DF	ISR	Omri Ben Harush (to F.C. Ashdod)
—	MF	ISR	Elian Rohana (to Hapoel Tel Aviv)
—	MF	ISR	Ofek Reuven (Free agent)
—	MF	ISR	Daniel Seneor (to Hapoel Afula)
—	MF	SUR	Roscello Vlijter (Free agent)
—	FW	ISR	Roy Beker (to Maccabi Ironi Ashdod)
—	FW	ISR	Iyad Haj (to Hapoel Afula)
—	FW	ISR	Roey Ben Shimon (to Beitar Jerusalem)

=== Hapoel Nof HaGalil ===
In:

No.	Pos.	Nation	Player
—	GK	ISR	Gil Barda (from Shimshon Tel Aviv)
—	DF	ISR	Amir Ella (on loan from Hapoel Tel Aviv)
—	FW	ISR	Ben Mizan (from Free transfer)

Out:

No.	Pos.	Nation	Player
—	GK	ISR	Doron Michaeli (to F.C. Kiryat Yam)
—	DF	ISR	Yarin Serdal (to Hapoel Umm al-Fahm, his player card still belongs to Hapoel Haifa)
—	MF	ISR	Liav Preda (to Hapoel Afula)
—	FW	ISR	Alon Buzorgi (to Hapoel Kfar Saba)

=== Hapoel Ramat Gan ===
In:

No.	Pos.	Nation	Player
—	FW	ISR	Mor Fadida (Free transfer)
—	FW	ISR	Yaniv Mizrahi (on loan from Maccabi Netanya)
—	FW	NGA	Peter Olawale (from (Malta) Balzan)

Out:

No.	Pos.	Nation	Player
—	GK	ISR	Tomer Alon (loan return to Maccabi Tel Aviv)
—	DF	GAM	Ousmane Touray (Free agent)
—	MF	ISR	Dasalin Ayala (to F.C. Holon Yermiyahu)
—	MF	ISR	Eyal Inbrum (to Hapoel Kfar Shalem, his player card still belongs to Maccabi Petah Tikva)
—	FW	ZAM	Richard Ngoma (Free agent)
—	FW	ISR	Mor Fadida (to Sektzia Ness Ziona)

=== Hapoel Ramat HaSharon ===
In:

No.	Pos.	Nation	Player
—	DF	ISR	Idan Cohen (Fre transfer)
—	DF	ISR	Guy Mishpati (Fre transfer)
—	MF	ISR	Ronen Gerdashov (on loan from Bnei Yehuda)
—	MF	CIV	Claude Kouakou (from Bnei Yehuda)
—	FW	ISR	Yehonatan Levy (from Hapoel Rishon LeZion)

Out:

No.	Pos.	Nation	Player
—	DF	ISR	Itay Ben Hemo (to Bnei Sakhnin, his player card still belongs to Maccabi Tel Aviv)
—	FW	NGA	Peter Onyekachi (on loan to Ironi Kiryat Shmona)
—	FW	ISR	Shay Balahssan (to Sektzia Ness Ziona)

=== Hapoel Rishon LeZion ===
In:

No.	Pos.	Nation	Player
—	DF	CIV	Kouya Mabea (from Hapoel Hadera)
—	MF	ISR	Shay Ayzen (from Bnei Yehuda)
—	MF	ISR	Eilon Elimelech (from Ironi Tiberias)
—	MF	ISR	Daniel David Tzadik (on loan from Hapoel Tel Aviv)
—	FW	ISR	Amir Altoury (on loan from Maccabi Petah Tikva)
—	FW	ISR	Orel Baye (from Hapoel Hadera, his player card still belongs to Maccabi Tel Aviv)
—	FW	ISR	Yoav Tomer (from Hapoel Hadera)

Out:

No.	Pos.	Nation	Player
—	DF	ISR	Sahar Revivo (to Sektzia Ness Ziona)
—	MF	ISR	Netanel Malka Peretz (to Hapoel Ashdod)
—	MF	ISR	Ori Zohar (to Shimshon Tel Aviv)
—	MF	ISR	Gal Shalhevet (to Hapoel Herzliya)
—	MF	ISR	Dor Osowsky (on loan to Maccabi Sha'arayim)
—	FW	SLE	Emmanuel Samadia (to (United States) Hartford Athletic)
—	FW	ISR	Ohad Almagor (to Hapoel Jerusalem)
—	FW	ISR	Yehonatan Levy (to Hapoel Ramat HaSharon)
—	FW	ISR	Ibrahim Badir (to Shimshon Kafr Qasim)

=== Hapoel Umm al-Fahm ===
In:

No.	Pos.	Nation	Player
—	DF	ISR	Itamar Tzafrir (Free transfer)
—	DF	ISR	Tal Kachila (from Hapoel Afula)
—	DF	ISR	Yarin Serdal (on loan from Hapoel Haifa)
—	DF	ISR	Ahmad Switat (from (Armenia) FC Noah)
—	MF	ISR	Gal Levi (Free transfer)
—	MF	ISR	Shay Golan (Free transfer)
—	FW	ISR	Oz Peretz (Free transfer)
—	FW	ISR	Ahmad Darawshe (Free transfer)
—	FW	CRC	Rachid Chirino (on loan from Maccabi Netanya)
—	FW	ISR	Gal Katabi (Free transfer)

Out:

No.	Pos.	Nation	Player
—	DF	ISR	Kobi Mor (to Maccabi Kabilio Jaffa)
—	DF	ISR	Ahmed Younes (to Tzeirei Umm al-Fahm)
—	DF	PLE	Ameed Mahajna (on loan to (Qatar) Al-Rayyan)
—	MF	ISR	Reef Mesika (to Ironi Tiberias)
—	MF	ISR	Hamza Mawassi (to Shimshon Tel Aviv)
—	MF	ISR	Kamal Agbaria (on loan to Tzeirei Umm al-Fahm)
—	FW	ISR	Michael Maman (to Bnei Yehuda)
—	FW	ISR	Samah Mar'ab (Free agent)
—	FW	ISR	Aviel Ben Hemo (to Hapoel Herzliya)
—	FW	SRB	Nikola Terzić (to (Serbia) IMT)
—	FW	ISR	Ben Azubel (to (Thailand) Trat)

=== Ihud Bnei Shefa-'Amr ===
In:

No.	Pos.	Nation	Player
—	GK	ISR	Itamar Israeli (Free transfer)
—	DF	ISR	Yazan Nassar (from Bnei Sakhnin)
—	DF	ISR	Yarin Hassan (Free transfer)
—	MF	ISR	Anes Dabour (from Hapoel Acre)
—	MF	ISR	Barak Anglister (from Maccabi Netanya)
—	MF	ISR	Ismaeel Ryan (Free transfer)
—	MF	ISR	Afik Katan (Free transfer)
—	MF	ROU	Alexandru Răuță (from (Romania) CS Mioveni)
—	FW	ISR	Yoel Abuhatzira (from Bnei Sakhnin)
—	FW	CMR	Cyrille Tchamba (from (Georgia (country)) Saburtalo Tbilisi)

Out:

No.	Pos.	Nation	Player
—	GK	ISR	Yossi Ginzburg (to Sektzia Ness Ziona)
—	DF	ISR	Ali Abbas (Free agent)
—	DF	ISR	Muamen Qadri (on loan to Tzeirei Tamra)
—	MF	ISR	Anas Nasser (Free agent)
—	MF	NGA	Jerry Akose (Free agent)
—	MF	BRA	Daniel Farias (Free agent)
—	MF	ISR	Amir Abu Nil (to Maccabi Umm al-Fahm)
—	MF	ISR	Mustapha Sheikh Yosef (to Hapoel Kfar Saba)
—	FW	ISR	Mohammed Abu Ayash (to Ironi Nesher)
—	FW	ISR	Amer Eldadeh (to F.C. Dimona)
—	FW	ISR	Hussein Bushanek (to F.C. Shefa-'Amr)
—	FW	PLE	Ali El-Khatib (to Hapoel Nof HaGalil)
—	FW	ISR	Hassan Subah (on loan to Al-Ahly Tamra)
—	FW	ISR	Danni Amer (to Maccabi Jaffa)

=== Ironi Kiryat Shmona ===
In:

No.	Pos.	Nation	Player
—	MF	CMR	Georges Mandjeck (Free transfer)

Out:

No.	Pos.	Nation	Player
—	DF	ISR	Ziv Morgan (to Hapoel Tel Aviv, previously loaned to (Romania) CFR Cluj)
—	FW	BRA	Gian (Free agent)
—	FW	ISR	Mohamed Khatib (to Maccabi Bnei Reineh)

=== Ironi Tiberias ===
In:

No.	Pos.	Nation	Player
—	MF	ISR	Reef Mesika (from Hapoel Umm al-Fahm)
—	MF	ISR	Itay Zada (on loan from Hapoel Jerusalem)
—	MF	GHA	Gideon Akaouwa (from Maccabi Petah Tikva)

Out:

No.	Pos.	Nation	Player
—	MF	ISR	Eilon Elimelech (to Hapoel Rishon LeZion)
—	MF	GHA	Gershon Koffie (to Maccabi Herzliya)
—	FW	ISR	Omer Buaron (to Hapoel Kfar Shalem)
—	FW	ISR	Sapir Razon (to F.C. Holon Yermiyahu)

=== Maccabi Herzliya ===
In:

No.	Pos.	Nation	Player
—	DF	ISR	Ran Vaturi (Free transfer)
—	DF	ISR	Sahar Dabach (Free transfer)
—	MF	ISR	Roei Alkukin (on loan from Hapoel Tel Aviv)
—	MF	GHA	Gershon Koffie (from Ironi Tiberias)
—	FW	ISR	Dor Jan (from Hapoel Hadera)

Out:

No.	Pos.	Nation	Player
—	DF	ISR	Ofer Verta (Free agent)
—	FW	ISR	Amit Mizrahi (to F.C. Kiryat Yam)
—	FW	ISR	Ido Exbard (to Hapoel Kfar Shalem)

=== Maccabi Jaffa ===
In:

No.	Pos.	Nation	Player
—	DF	ISR	Kobi Mor (from Hapoel Umm al-Fahm)
—	MF	ISR	Marwan Kabha (from Maccabi Bnei Reineh)
—	FW	ISR	Walid Darwish (from Tzeirei Umm al-Fahm)
—	FW	ISR	Danni Amer (from Ihud Bnei Shefa-'Amr)

Out:

No.	Pos.	Nation	Player
—	DF	ISR	Guy Eini (on loan to F.C. Dimona)
—	DF	ISR	Shalev Semerlo (on loan to Hapoel Marmorek)
—	DF	CIV	Cheikh Mamadou Diabaté (to (Austria) Wolfsberger AC, previously loaned from Maccabi Petah Tikva)
—	MF	ISR	Liam Nagar (on loan to Hapoel Marmorek)
—	FW	ISR	David Tzur (on loan to Maccabi Kiryat Malakhi)
—	FW	ISR	Adir Maya (to Beitar Nordia Jerusalem)
—	FW	ISR	Ronen Hanchis (to Hapoel Kfar Saba, his player card still belongs to Maccabi Tel Aviv)
—	FW	ISR	Hayford Adjei (to Bnei Yehuda)

=== Sektzia Ness Ziona ===
In:

No.	Pos.	Nation	Player
—	GK	ISR	Yossi Ginzburg (from Ihud Bnei Shefa-'Amr)
—	DF	ISR	Tomer Machluf (Free transfer)
—	DF	ISR	Sahar Revivo (from Hapoel Rishon LeZion)
—	MF	ISR	Sintayehu Sallalich (Free transfer)
—	MF	ISR	Sean Malka (from F.C. Kafr Qasim)
—	FW	ISR	Mor Fadida (from Hapoel Ramat Gan)
—	FW	ISR	Shay Balahssan (from Hapoel Ramat HaSharon)

Out:

No.	Pos.	Nation	Player
—	GK	ISR	Danny Amos (Free agent)
—	GK	ISR	Ben Ozlebo (on loan to Hapoel Marmorek)
—	DF	ISR	Amir Ella (to Hapoel Nof HaGalil, his player card still belongs to Hapoel Tel Aviv)
—	DF	ISR	Or Raich (to F.C. Dimona)
—	DF	ISR	Ben Ozlebo (on loan to Hapoel Marmorek)
—	MF	ISR	Ori Cohen (on loan to Hapoel Marmorek)
—	FW	ISR	Eli Elbaz (to Ironi Modi'in)
—	FW	SVK	Jakub Sylvestr (Free agent)
—	FW	NGA	Benjamin Kuku (Free agent)

.
