= Dor Kochav =

Israeli footballer

Dor Kochav דור כוכב
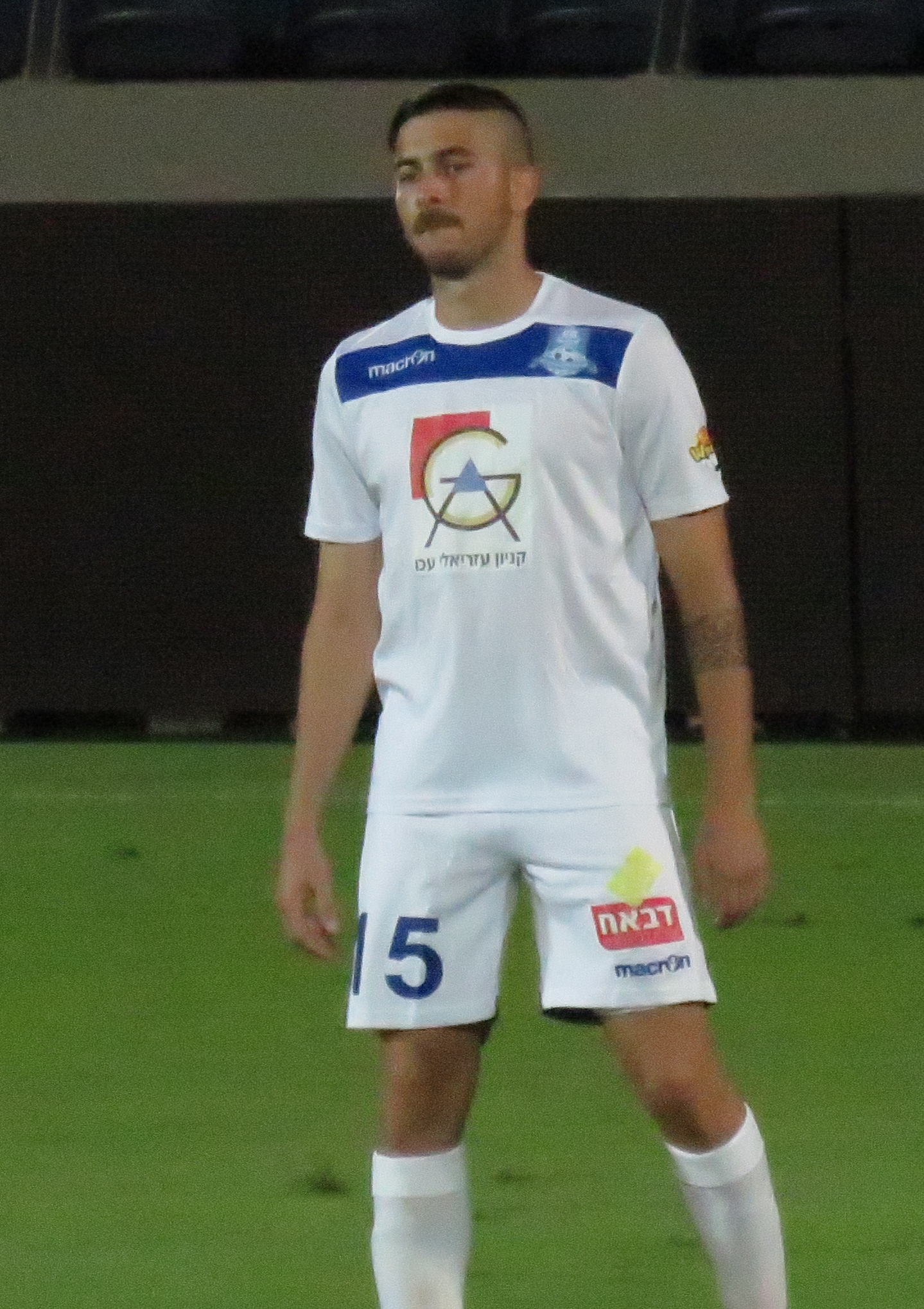
- Kochav playing for Hapoel Acre in 2015

Personal information
- Full name: Dor Kochav
- Date of birth: 6 May 1993 (age 33)
- Place of birth: Ramat Yishay, Israel
- Height: 1.75 m (5 ft 9 in)
- Position: Attacking midfielder

Team information
- Current team: Hapoel Yarka
- Number: 13

Youth career
- Maccabi Haifa

Senior career*
Years	Team	Apps	(Gls)
2012–2016	Maccabi Haifa	0	(0)
2013–2014	→ Hapoel Afula	32	(6)
2014–2015	→ Hapoel Petah Tikva	24	(2)
2015–2016	→ Hapoel Acre	24	(1)
2016–2017	Ironi Nesher	12	(0)
2017	Hapoel Afula	18	(1)
2017–2018	Hapoel Ramat HaSharon	32	(1)
2018–2019	Hapoel Afula	33	(6)
2019–2020	Bnei Yehuda	14	(1)
2020	Sektzia Ness Ziona	10	(3)
2020–2021	Hapoel Afula	34	(3)
2021–2023	Sektzia Ness Ziona	60	(2)
2023	Bnei Yehuda	1	(0)
2023–2024	Hapoel Ramat HaSharon	28	(2)
2024–2025	Hapoel Nof HaGalil	8	(0)
2025–2026	Hapoel Ra'anana	25	(0)
2026–	Hapoel Yarka	3	(0)
- * Club domestic league appearances and goals as of 24 June 2026

Dor Kochav (Hebrew: דור כוכב; born 6 May 1993) is an Israeli footballer who plays as a midfielder for Hapoel Yarka.

== Career ==
Dor Kochav played for the youth academy of Maccabi Haifa. On 8 February 2012 he made his debut for the senior team after coming up a substitute in the 79th minute in the Israeli Cup.
