= Branham Kabala =

Congolese footballer (born 2004)

Personal information
- Full name: Branham Braney Kabala
- Date of birth: 7 July 2004 (age 22)
- Place of birth: DR Congo
- Height: 1.79 m (5 ft 10 in)
- Position: Winger

Team information
- Current team: Al-Hamriyah (on loan from Al-Dhafra)
- Number: 77

Senior career*
Years	Team	Apps	(Gls)
2021–2022	Brésil		
2022–2023	Avenir de Rejiche	10	(1)
2023	ES Métlaoui	13	(1)
2023–2024	Beitar Jerusalem	1	(0)
2023–2024	→ Hapoel Rishon LeZion	28	(1)
2025–	Al-Dhafra	0	(0)
2026–	→ Al-Hamriyah (loan)	0	(0)
- * Club domestic league appearances and goals as of 1 June 2024 (UTC)

Branham Braney Kabala (born 7 July 2004) is a Congolese professional footballer who plays as a winger for Al-Hamriyah, on loan from Al-Dhafra.

== Career ==
Kabala started his career in the local club Brésil. On 16 September 2022, he signed for Tunisian Ligue Professionnelle 1 club Avenir de Rejiche and during the season signed for the league rival ES Métlaoui.

In July 2023 he signed for Beitar Jerusalem.

== Career statistics ==
As of 12 September 2023

Appearances and goals by club, season and competition
Club	Season	League			National cup		League cup		Continental		Other		Total	
Club	Season	Division	Apps	Goals	Apps	Goals	Apps	Goals	Apps	Goals	Apps	Goals	Apps	Goals
Avenir de Rejiche	2022–23	Tunisian Ligue Professionnelle 1	10	1	0	0	0	0	0	0	0	0	10	1
ES Métlaoui	2022–23	Tunisian Ligue Professionnelle 1	13	1	2	1	0	0	0	0	0	0	15	2
Beitar Jerusalem	2023–24	Israeli Premier League	1	0	0	0	1	0	0	0	0	0	2	0
Hapoel Rishon LeZion	2023–24	Liga Leumit	28	1	2	1	0	0	0	0	0	0	30	2
Career total			52	3	4	2	1	0	0	0	0	0	57	5
