= Sabastian Hernandez =

Israeli footballer

Sebastian Hernandez
Personal information
- Full name: Sebastian Isai Hernandez Lanus
- Date of birth: 16 January 2003 (age 23)
- Place of birth: Tel-Aviv, Israel
- Position: Midfielder

Team information
- Current team: Maccabi Ironi Amishav Petah Tikva

Senior career*
Years	Team	Apps	(Gls)
2021–2024	Hapoel Tel Aviv	1	(0)
2023–2024	→ Hapoel Kfar Shalem (loan)	0	(0)
2024–2025	→ Hapoel Marmorek (loan)	27	(0)
2025–	Maccabi Ironi Amishav Petah Tikva	13	(0)
- * Club domestic league appearances and goals as of 8 October 2025

Sebastian Isai Hernandez Lanus (Hebrew: סבסטיאן איסאיי הרננדז לאנוס; born 16 January 2003) is an Israeli professional footballer who plays as a midfielder for Maccabi Ironi Amishav Petah Tikva.

== Personal life ==
Hernandez was born in Israel to a Peruvian mother and a Uruguayan father.

== Career statistics ==
=== Club ===
As of 17 July 2023.

Club	Season	League			State Cup		Toto Cup		Continental		Other		Total	
Club	Season	Division	Apps	Goals	Apps	Goals	Apps	Goals	Apps	Goals	Apps	Goals	Apps	Goals
Hapoel Tel Aviv	2021–22	Israeli Premier League	0	0	0	0	1	0	–		0	0	1	0
Hapoel Tel Aviv	2022–23	Israeli Premier League	1	0	0	0	0	0	–		0	0	1	0
Hapoel Tel Aviv	2023–24	Israeli Premier League	0	0	0	0	0	0	–		1	0	1	0
Hapoel Tel Aviv	Total		1	0	0	0	1	0	0	0	1	0	3	0
Hapoel Marmorek	2023–24	Liga Alef	27	0	1	0	0	0	–		0	0	28	0
Hapoel Marmorek	Total		27	0	1	0	0	0	0	0	0	0	28	0
Career total			28	0	1	0	1	0	0	0	1	0	3	0
