= Amir Altoury =

Israeli footballer

Personal information
- Date of birth: 2 September 2003 (age 23)
- Place of birth: Kafr Qasim, Israel
- Position: Forward

Team information
- Current team: Kafr Qasim

Senior career*
Years	Team	Apps	(Gls)
2020–	Maccabi Petah Tikva	44	(6)
2024	→ Hapoel Rishon LeZion	17	(3)
2026–	→ Kafr Qasim	17	(1)

International career^{‡}
2019	Israel U17	2	(0)
- * Club domestic league appearances and goals as of 24 June 2026 ‡ National team caps and goals as of 23:19, 20 June 2020 (UTC)

Amir Altoury (Hebrew: אמיר אלטורי; born 2 September 2003) is an Israeli footballer who currently plays as a forward for Kafr Qasim.

== Career statistics ==
=== Club ===
As of 24 June 2026

Club	Season	League			State Cup		Toto Cup		Continental		Other		Total	
Club	Season	Division	Apps	Goals	Apps	Goals	Apps	Goals	Apps	Goals	Apps	Goals	Apps	Goals
Maccabi Petah Tikva	2019–20	Israeli Premier League	3	0	0	0	0	0	–		0	0	3	0
Maccabi Petah Tikva	2021–22	Israeli Premier League	0	0	0	0	1	0	–		0	0	1	0
Maccabi Petah Tikva	2022–23	Liga Leumit	8	1	0	0	0	0	–		0	0	8	1
Maccabi Petah Tikva	2023–24	Israeli Premier League	4	1	1	0	3	0	–		0	0	8	1
Maccabi Petah Tikva	2024–25	Israeli Premier League	15	2	1	0	–		2	0	1	0	19	2
Maccabi Petah Tikva	2025–26	Liga Leumit	14	2	1	0	4	1	0	0	0	0	19	3
Maccabi Petah Tikva	Total		44	6	3	0	8	1	2	0	1	0	58	7
Hapoel Rishon LeZion (loan)	2023–24	Liga Leumit	17	3	1	0	0	0	–		0	0	18	3
F.C. Kafr Qasim (loan)	2025–26	Liga Leumit	17	1	1	0	0	0	–		0	0	18	1
Career total			78	10	5	0	8	1	2	0	1	0	94	11
