= Eithan Velblum =

Israeli footballer

Personal information
- Full name: Eithan Velblum
- Date of birth: 27 February 1997 (age 29)
- Place of birth: Haifa, Israel
- Position: Midfielder

Team information
- Current team: Ironi Tiberias
- Number: 8

Youth career
- 2006–2017: Maccabi Haifa

Senior career*
Years	Team	Apps	(Gls)
2017–2019	Maccabi Haifa	7	(0)
2017–2018	→ Hapoel Ramat Gan	10	(0)
2018–2019	→ Hapoel Nof HaGalil	51	(6)
2019–2020	Bnei Yehuda	27	(0)
2020	→ CS Mioveni	6	(0)
2021	→ Hapoel Nof HaGalil	17	(2)
2022–2023	→ Hapoel Nof HaGalil	42	(3)
2023–	Ironi Tiberias	30	(3)

International career
2012–2013	Israel U16	8	(2)
2013	Israel U17	9	(0)
2015–2016	Israel U19	13	(0)
- * Club domestic league appearances and goals as of 24 June 2026

Eithan Velblum (Hebrew: איתן וולבלום; born 27 February 1997) is an Israeli footballer who plays for Ironi Tiberias as a midfielder.

Velblum is a product of the youth team of Maccabi Haifa. On 14 September 2020 signed for the Liga II club CS Mioveni, then signed for Ironi Tiberias on 13 July 2023. On 28 August 2024, he injured his cruciate ligament.
