= David Cuperman =

Colombian footballer (born 1996)

Personal information
- Full name: David Cuperman Coifman
- Date of birth: 8 November 1996 (age 30)
- Place of birth: Bogotá, Colombia
- Height: 1.81 m (5 ft 11 in)
- Position: Left-back

College career
Years	Team	Apps	(Gls)
2015–2017	Averett University	51	(21)

Senior career*
Years	Team	Apps	(Gls)
2019–2022	Fortaleza	54	(3)
2021	→ Alianza Petrolera	11	(0)
2022–2024	FC Ashdod	32	(0)
2024–2025	Hapoel Tel Aviv	28	(1)
- * Club domestic league appearances and goals as of 11 July 2025

David Cuperman (Hebrew: דוד קופרמן; born 8 November 1996) is a Colombian of Polish and Israelí descent professional footballer who plays as a left-back.

== Early life ==
Cuperman was born to parents Salomon Cuperman and Raquel Coifman in Bogota. After attending Colegio Colombo Hebreo for high school, Cuperman left for the US to study sports management and coaching at Averett University. He earned USA South All-Conference First Team honors. Cuperman was named to the 2017 Jewish Sports Review Men's Soccer All-America First Team for Division II and II.

== Career ==
In 2017, Cuperman traveled to Israel to represent Colombia at the 2017 Maccabiah Games.

He made his debut in the Colombian Categoría Primera A with Alianza Petrolera on 16 February 2021, starting at left midfield against Patriotas Boyacá.

In 2022, Cuperman joined FC Ashdod in Israel on trial.

== Personal life ==
Born in Colombia, Cuperman is of Polish-Jewish descent. On 10 August 2022 became an Israeli citizen.

== See also ==
- List of select Jewish football (association; soccer) players
