= Niv Fliter =

Israeli footballer (born 2001)

Personal information
- Date of birth: 27 May 2001 (age 25)
- Place of birth: Rishon LeZion, Israel
- Height: 1.85 m (6 ft 1 in)
- Position: Right-back

Team information
- Current team: Maccabi Jaffa
- Number: 27

Youth career
- 2009–2016: Maccabi Tel Aviv
- 2016–2017: Hapoel Ramat Gan
- 2017–2019: Hapoel Tel Aviv
- 2019–2021: Maccabi Jaffa

Senior career*
Years	Team	Apps	(Gls)
2020–2023	Maccabi Jaffa	78	(1)
2023–2024	Hapoel Be'er Sheva	5	(1)
2024	→ Maccabi Bnei Reineh (loan)	8	(0)
2024–2025	Enosis Neon Paralimni	19	(0)
2025–	Maccabi Jaffa	24	(2)
- * Club domestic league appearances and goals as of 24 June 2026

Niv Fliter (Hebrew: ניב פליטר; born 27 May 2001) is an Israeli footballer who plays as a right-back for Israeli club Maccabi Jaffa.

== Career ==
=== Hapoel Be'er Sheva ===
On 3 July 2023, Fliter signed with Hapoel Be'er Sheva from the Israeli Premier League for four years.

== Career statistics ==
As of 1 June 2026

Appearances and goals by club, season and competition
Club	Season	League			National cup		League cup		Europe		Other		Total	
Club	Season	Division	Apps	Goals	Apps	Goals	Apps	Goals	Apps	Goals	Apps	Goals	Apps	Goals
Maccabi Jaffa	2019–20	Liga Alef	5	0	0	0	0	0	–	–	0	0	5	0
Maccabi Jaffa	2020–21	Liga Alef	7	0	1	0	0	0	–	–	0	0	7	0
Maccabi Jaffa	2021–22	Liga Alef	31	1	7	0	0	0	–	–	0	0	38	1
Maccabi Jaffa	2022–23	Liga Leumit	35	0	1	0	4	0	–	–	0	0	40	0
Maccabi Jaffa	Total		78	1	9	0	4	0	–	–	0	0	91	1
Hapoel Be'er Sheva	2023–24	Israeli Premier League	5	1	0	0	1	0	0	0	0	0	6	1
Maccabi Bnei Reineh	2023–24	Israeli Premier League	8	0	1	0	0	0	0	0	0	0	9	0
Enosis Neon Paralimni	2024–25	Cypriot First Division	18	0	1	0	0	0	0	0	0	0	19	0
Maccabi Jaffa	2025–26	Liga Leumit	24	2	3	0	0	0	0	0	0	0	27	2
Career total			133	4	14	0	5	0	–	–	0	0	152	4
