= Amir Ariely =

Israeli footballer (born 2003)

Personal information
- Full name: Amir Moshe Ariely
- Date of birth: 3 March 2003 (age 23)
- Place of birth: Tel Aviv, Israel
- Position: Centre-back

Team information
- Current team: Hapoel Acre
- Number: 13

Youth career
- 2011–2018: Maccabi Tel Aviv
- 2018–2019: Maccabi Netanya
- 2019–2023: Barnsley

Senior career*
Years	Team	Apps	(Gls)
2023–	Hapoel Be'er Sheva	3	(0)
2023–2024	→ Hapoel Jerusalem	1	(0)
2024	→ Hapoel Acre	1	(1)
2025 -	Hapoel Marmorek	1	(1)
- * Club domestic league appearances and goals as of 3 December 2025 @ 13:12(AEST)

Amir Ariely (Or Amir Arieli; Hebrew: אמיר אריאלי; born 3 March 2003) is an Israeli footballer who plays as a centre-back for Hapoel Be'er Sheva from the Israeli Premier League.

== Career ==
On 30 January 2023, Ariely signed with Hapoel Be'er Sheva of the Israeli Premier League for three and a half years.

== Career statistics ==
As of 1 February 2024

Appearances and goals by club, season and competition
Club	Season	League			National cup		League cup		Europe		Other		Total	
Club	Season	Division	Apps	Goals	Apps	Goals	Apps	Goals	Apps	Goals	Apps	Goals	Apps	Goals
Hapoel Be'er Sheva	2022–23	Israeli Premier League	3	0	0	0	–		–		0	0	3	0
Hapoel Jerusalem	2023–24	Israeli Premier League	1	0	0	0	2	0	–		0	0	3	0
Hapoel Acre	2023–24	Liga Leumit	1	0	0	0	–		–		0	0	1	0
Career total			5	0	0	0	2	0	0	0	0	0	7	0
