= David Tweh =

Liberian footballer

Personal information
- Full name: David Teklo Tweh
- Date of birth: 25 December 1998 (age 27)
- Place of birth: Monrovia, Liberia
- Height: 1.72 m (5 ft 7 1/2 in)
- Position: Midfielder

Senior career*
Years	Team	Apps	(Gls)
2014–2015	NPA Anchors		
2016–2018	Barrack Young Controllers		
2019–2020	Energetik-BGU Minsk	43	(7)
2020	Dynamo Brest	12	(1)
2021	Rukh Brest	22	(1)
2022–2023	Hapoel Nof HaGalil	44	(4)
2023–2024	Botoșani	0	(0)
2024	Hapoel Kfar Saba	8	(0)
2024–2025	Dynamo Brest	11	(1)
2025	Isloch	11	(0)

International career^{‡}
2016–	Liberia	10	(0)
- * Club domestic league appearances and goals as of 3 April 2026 ‡ National team caps and goals as of 27 September 2022

David Tweh (born 25 December 1998) is a Liberian professional footballer who plays for the Liberia national team.

== Career statistics ==
As of matches played on 27 September 2022

Appearances and goals by national team and year
National team	Year	Apps	Goals
Liberia	2016	1	0
Liberia	2017	3	0
Liberia	2018	0	0
Liberia	2019	1	0
Liberia	2020	0	0
Liberia	2021	3	0
Liberia	2022	2	0
Liberia	2023	0	0
Total		10	0
