= Cheick Mamadou Diabaté =

Ivorian footballer (born 2004)

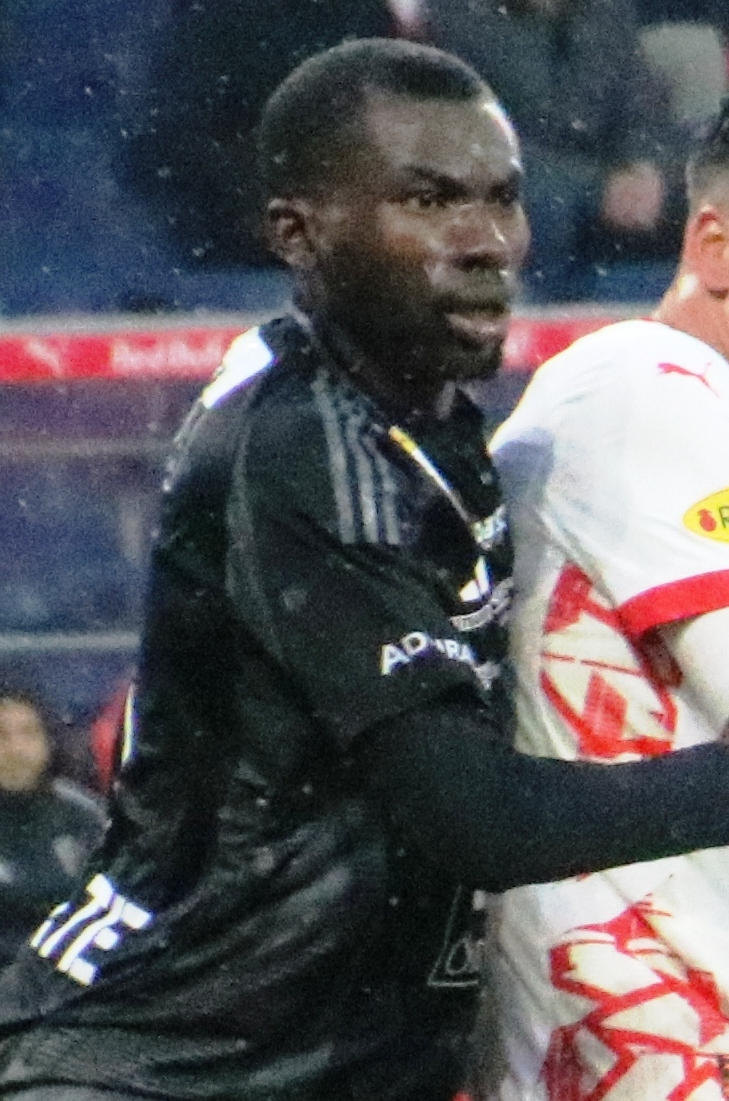
- Diabaté in 2025

Personal information
- Date of birth: 1 January 2004 (age 22)
- Place of birth: Abidjan, Ivory Coast
- Height: 1.88 m (6 ft 2 in)
- Position: Centre-back

Team information
- Current team: Wolfsberger AC
- Number: 5

Youth career
- Bouaké
- 2022–2023: Maccabi Petah Tikva

Senior career*
| Years | Team | Apps | (Gls) |
| 2023–2024 | Maccabi Petah Tikva | 0 | (0) |
| 2023–2024 | →Maccabi Jaffa (loan) | 16 | (0) |
| 2024– | Wolfsberger AC II | 1 | (0) |
| 2024– | Wolfsberger AC | 55 | (0) |
- * Club domestic league appearances and goals as of 10 June 2026 ‡ National team caps and goals as of 15:26, 7 July 2025 (UTC)

Cheick Mamadou Diabaté (born 1 January 2004) is an Ivorian professional football player who plays as a centre-back for Austrian Football Bundesliga club Wolfsberger AC.

== Career ==
A product of the youth academy of the Ivorian club Bouaké, Diabaté moved to the Israeli club Maccabi Petah Tikva. On 4 June 2024, he joined Maccabi Jaffa in the Liga Leumit on a year-long loan for the 2023–24 season. On 6 February 2024, his loan was cut short and he transferred to the Austrian Football Bundesliga club Wolfsberger AC on a contract until 2027.

== Honours ==
Wolfsberger AC

- Austrian Cup: 2024–25
