= Amir Berkovits =

Israeli footballer (born 2000)

Personal information
- Full name: Amir Berkovits
- Date of birth: 3 June 2000 (age 26)
- Place of birth: Even Yehuda, Israel
- Height: 1.72 m (5 ft 7 1/2 in)
- Position: Winger

Team information
- Current team: Hapoel Ra'anana

Youth career
- 2008–2010: Hapoel Pardesiya
- 2010–2016: Hapoel Ra'anana
- 2013–2014: → Maccabi Herzliya
- 2016–2019: Barnsley

Senior career*
Years	Team	Apps	(Gls)
2019–2021	Maccabi Tel Aviv	0	(0)
2019–2021	→ Beitar Tel Aviv Bat Yam	63	(14)
2021–2023	Maccabi Netanya	46	(2)
2023	Maccabi Petah Tikva	0	(0)
2023–2024	Beitar Jerusalem	11	(1)
2024	Hapoel Hadera	8	(0)
2024–2025	Hapoel Petah Tikva	18	(1)
2025–2026	Hapoel Rishon LeZion	44	(7)
2026–	Hapoel Ra'anana	0	(0)

International career
2016	Israel U16	8	(0)
2016	Israel U17	4	(1)
2017	Israel U19	2	(0)
2022–2023	Israel U21	1	(1)
- * Club domestic league appearances and goals as of 24 June 2026

Amir Berkovits (Hebrew: אמיר ברקוביץ'; born 3 June 2000) is an Israeli professional footballer who plays as a winger for Liga Leumit club Hapoel Ra'anana.

== Club career ==
Berkovits began his career for children team of Hapoel Pardesiya. At summer 2016 signed for Barnsley's academy.

On 6 August 2019 signed for Maccabi Tel Aviv and loaned to Beitar Tel Aviv Bat Yam for two seasons.

On 25 May 2021 signed the Israeli Premier League club Maccabi Netanya.

== Career statistics ==
=== Club ===
As of 13 February 2025

Club	Season	League			Cup		League Cup		Continental		Other		Total	
Club	Season	Division	Apps	Goals	Apps	Goals	Apps	Goals	Apps	Goals	Apps	Goals	Apps	Goals
Beitar Tel Aviv Bat Yam	2019–20	Liga Leumit	30	8	0	0	3	0	0	0	0	0	33	8
Beitar Tel Aviv Bat Yam	2020–21	Liga Leumit	33	6	5	1	4	1	0	0	0	0	42	8
Beitar Tel Aviv Bat Yam	Total		63	14	5	1	7	1	0	0	0	0	75	16
Maccabi Netanya	2021–22	Israeli Premier League	27	1	2	0	0	0	0	0	0	0	29	1
Maccabi Netanya	2022–23	Israeli Premier League	19	1	4	1	3	0	2	0	0	0	28	2
Maccabi Netanya	Total		46	2	6	1	3	0	2	0	0	0	57	3
Maccabi Petah Tikva	2023–24	Israeli Premier League	0	0	0	0	2	0	0	0	0	0	2	0
Maccabi Petah Tikva	Total		0	0	0	0	2	0	0	0	0	0	2	0
Beitar Jerusalem	2023–24	Israeli Premier League	11	1	0	0	1	0	0	0	0	0	12	0
Beitar Jerusalem	Total		11	1	0	0	1	0	0	0	0	0	12	0
Hapoel Hadera	2023–24	Israeli Premier League	8	0	0	0	0	0	0	0	0	0	8	0
Hapoel Hadera	Total		8	0	0	0	0	0	0	0	0	0	8	0
Hapoel Petah Tikva	2024–25	Liga Leumit	18	1	2	1	4	0	0	0	0	0	24	2
Hapoel Petah Tikva	Total		18	1	2	1	4	0	0	0	0	0	24	2
Hapoel Rishon LeZion	2024–25	Liga Leumit	1	0	0	0	0	0	0	0	0	0	1	0
Hapoel Rishon LeZion	Total		18	1	2	1	4	0	0	0	0	0	24	2
Career total			136	17	13	3	16	1	2	0	0	0	167	21
