= Ofek Fishler =

Israeli footballer

Personal information
- Full name: Ofek Fishler
- Date of birth: 24 August 1996 (age 30)
- Place of birth: Haifa, Israel
- Height: 1.82 m (5 ft 11 1/2 in)
- Position: Centre back

Team information
- Current team: Hapoel Afula
- Number: 5

Youth career
- 2007–2015: Hapoel Haifa

Senior career*
Years	Team	Apps	(Gls)
2015–2022	Hapoel Haifa	8	(0)
2018	→ Beitar Tel Aviv Ramla	12	(1)
2018–2019	→ Hapoel Nazareth Illit	16	(0)
2019	→ Hapoel Acre	13	(0)
2019–2020	→ Hapoel Nof HaGalil	19	(0)
2020–2021	→ Maccabi Ahi Nazareth	35	(0)
2021–2022	→ Hapoel Petah Tikva	34	(1)
2022–2023	Hapoel Petah Tikva	21	(0)
2023–2024	Ihud Bnei Shefa-'Amr	16	(1)
2024–2025	Hapoel Kfar Saba	53	(3)
2025–	Hapoel Afula	21	(0)

International career
2012	Israel U16	3	(0)
2012	Israel U17	1	(0)
2013	Israel U18	2	(0)
2014	Israel U19	4	(0)
- * Club domestic league appearances and goals as of 24 June 2026

Ofek Fishler (Hebrew: אופק פישלר; born 24 August 1996) is an Israeli footballer who plays for Hapoel Afula.

== Career ==
Fishler joined Hapoel Haifa in 2007, playing through the youth teams until 2015. On 14 March 2015, Fishler made his debut on the senior team, against local rivals Maccabi Haifa. Fishler made two further appearances for the senior team later in the season.

Fishler played for the national team in youth levels, appearing in a total of 10 matches.
