= Ziv Morgan =

Israeli footballer

Personal information
- Date of birth: 19 January 2000 (age 26)
- Place of birth: Hadera, Israel
- Height: 1.84 m (6 ft 1/2 in)
- Positions: Left-back; center-back

Team information
- Current team: Hapoel Tel Aviv
- Number: 3

Youth career
- 2008–2015: Beitar Tubruk
- 2015–2018: Maccabi Haifa
- 2018–2019: Ironi Kiryat Shmona

Senior career*
Years	Team	Apps	(Gls)
2019–2024	Ironi Kiryat Shmona	108	(2)
2023–2024	→ CFR Cluj (loan)	15	(0)
2024–2026	Hapoel Tel Aviv	48	(2)

International career^{‡}
2017	Israel U17	2	(0)
2017	Israel U18	1	(0)
2017–2019	Israel U19	7	(0)
2019–2023	Israel U21	10	(0)
- * Club domestic league appearances and goals as of 25 May 2026 ‡ National team caps and goals as of 19 July 2023

Ziv Morgan (Hebrew: זיו מורגן; born 19 January 2000) is an Israeli professional football player who plays as a left-back for Israeli Premier League club

== Early life ==
He also holds a Portuguese passport, on account of his Sephardi Jewish ancestors, which eases the move to certain European football leagues.

== Club career ==
=== CFR Cluj ===
On 19 July 2023, Morgan agreed on a one-year transfer to CFR Cluj, on loan with an option to buy, for an €150,000 transfer fee.
