= Rachid Chirino =

Costa Rican footballer (born 2000)

Personal information
- Full name: Rachid Enrique Chirino Serrano
- Date of birth: 21 October 2000 (age 26)
- Place of birth: Costa Rica
- Height: 1.72 m (5 ft 8 in)
- Position: Winger

Team information
- Current team: Inter San Carlos

Senior career*
Years	Team	Apps	(Gls)
2019–2023	San Carlos	134	(18)
2023–2024	Maccabi Netanya	10	(1)
2024	→ Hapoel Umm al-Fahm (loan)	13	(2)
2024–	Deportivo Saprissa	4	(1)

International career
2021	Costa Rica	1	(0)
- * Club domestic league appearances and goals as of 1 June 2024

Rachid Enrique Chirino Serrano (born 21 October 2000) is a Costa Rican footballer who plays as a winger for Deportivo Saprissa.

== Early life ==
Chirino was born in 2000 in Costa Rica. He is a native of Quesada, Costa Rica.

== Career ==
Chirino started his career with Costa Rican side San Carlos. He was described as ""one of the most constant and beloved players on the San Carlos team". In 2023, he signed for Israeli side Maccabi Netanya. In 2024, he signed for Israeli side Hapoel Umm al-Fahm.

== Personal life ==
Chirino is the brother of Costa Rican footballer Randy Chirino. He is the son of Shirley and Carlos Chirino.
