= Alaa Aldeen Hassan =

Palestinian footballer

Personal information
- Date of birth: 30 January 2000 (age 26)
- Place of birth: Mashhad, Israel
- Height: 1.80 m (5 ft 11 in)
- Position: Winger

Team information
- Current team: Al-Gharafa
- Number: 90

Youth career
- Maccabi Haifa
- Beitar Kafr Kanna
- –2019: Alemannia Aachen
- 2019–2020: Famalicão

Senior career*
Years	Team	Apps	(Gls)
2021	Hapoel Kaukab	11	(3)
2021–2022	Kafr Qasim	33	(4)
2022–2023	Hapoel Umm al-Fahm	13	(1)
2023–2024	Bnei Sakhnin	2	(0)
2024–2026	Al-Arabi	18	(4)
2026–	Al-Gharafa	6	(1)

International career^{‡}
2023–	Palestine	7	(0)
- * Club domestic league appearances and goals as of 17 January 2026 ‡ National team caps and goals as of 26 March 2024

Alaa Aldeen Hassan (Arabic: عَلَاء الدِّين حَسَن, Hebrew: עלאא א-דין חסן; born 31 January 2000) is a professional footballer who plays as a winger for Qatar Stars League team Al-Gharafa. Born in Israel, he plays on the Palestine national team.

== Club career ==
Born in Mashhad, Hassan started playing football for Maccabi Haifa and Beitar Kafr Kanna. He then moved to German club Alemannia Aachen and later to Famalicão.

In March 2021, Hassan signed for Hapoel Kaukab and made his senior debut there.

In October 2021, Hassan joined Liga Leumit club Kafr Qasim. On 26 October, he made his debut for the club in the 2–0 win against Maccabi Yavne in the Israel State Cup. After one season at the club, he joined league fellow Hapoel Umm al-Fahm.

On 15 June 2023, Hassan signed a three-year contract with Israeli Premier League club Bnei Sakhnin. On 2 January 2024, Bnei Sakhin announced the termination of Hassan's contract with the club due to "his lack of professionalism".

In February 2024, Hassan joined Qatar Stars League side Al-Arabi.

== International career ==
On 6 September 2023, Hassan made his international debut with the Palestine national team in a 1–2 friendly loss to Oman.

In January 2024, Hassan was named to Palestine's 26-man squad for the 2023 AFC Asian Cup, held in Qatar.

In July 2025, the Palestinian Football Association issued a statement condemning what it described as threats and intimidation directed at Hassan by an Israeli officer. The alleged threats included warnings of being pursued and harassed, as well as efforts to bring his career to an end. These actions reportedly took place during Hassan's visit to his hometown of Mashhad, during which his mobile phone was also confiscated. It has been reported that Bnei Sakhnin, was compelled to terminate his contract after he was called up to represent the Palestinian national team in September 2023.

=== International ===
As of match played 28 September 2026

Scores and results list Palestine's goal tally first, score column indicates score after each Aldeen Hassan goal.

List of international goals scored by Alaa Aldeen Hassan
No.	Date	Venue	Opponent	Score	Result	Competition
1	28 September 2026	Tongliang Long Stadium, Chongqing, China	Tajikistan	3–2	4–2	Friendly
