= Yogev Hazuharoui =

Israeli footballer

Personal information
- Full name: Yogev Hazuharoui Lerman
- Date of birth: October 20, 1991 (age 35)
- Place of birth: Palmahim, Israel
- Height: 1.76 m (5 ft 9 1/2 in)
- Positions: Centre back; left back

Team information
- Current team: Tomy Tel Aviv

Youth career
- Hapoel Tel Aviv

Senior career*
Years	Team	Apps	(Gls)
2010–2012	Hapoel Tel Aviv	0	(0)
2010–2011	→ Hapoel Tzafririm Holon (loan)	28	(0)
2011–2012	→ Hapoel Herzliya (loan)	32	(2)
2012–2015	Hapoel Ra'anana	86	(1)
2015–2016	Hapoel Katamon Jerusalem	37	(0)
2016–2017	Ironi Kiryat Shmona	20	(1)
2017–2019	Hapoel Katamon Jerusalem	70	(3)
2019–2021	Hapoel Ramat HaSharon	57	(3)
2021–2023	F.C. Kafr Qasim	38	(1)
2023–2024	Bnei Yehuda	5	(0)
2024–2025	Hapoel Herzliya	4	(0)
2025–	Tomy Tel Aviv	6	(0)
- * Club domestic league appearances and goals as of 15 January 2026

Yogev Hazuharoui (Hebrew: יוגב הזוהרוי; born October 20, 1991) is an Israeli footballer who plays for Tomy Tel Aviv.
