= Noam Bonnet =

French footballer (born 2002)

Personal information
- Date of birth: 25 May 2002 (age 24)
- Place of birth: Paris, France
- Height: 1.77 m (5 ft 10 in)
- Position: Midfielder

Team information
- Current team: Hapoel Acre
- Number: 28

Youth career
- Lyon

Senior career*
Years	Team	Apps	(Gls)
2020–2023	Lyon B	54	(5)
2023–2024	Hapoel Tel Aviv	7	(0)
2024	→ Hapoel Acre	15	(0)
- * Club domestic league appearances and goals as of 1 June 2024

Noam Bonnet (Hebrew: נועם בונה; born 25 May 2002) is a French professional footballer who plays as a midfielder for Liga Leumit club Hapoel Acre.

== Early life ==
Bonnet was born in a Jewish family in Paris.

== Career ==
Bonnet started to play football in the Lyon Academy.

On 21 July 2023, he emigrated to Israel and signed for the Israeli Premier League club Hapoel Tel Aviv.

== Career statistics ==
As of 1 June 2024

Appearances and goals by club, season and competition
Club	Season	League			National cup		League cup		Continental		Other		Total	
Club	Season	Division	Apps	Goals	Apps	Goals	Apps	Goals	Apps	Goals	Apps	Goals	Apps	Goals
Lyon B	2020–21	Championnat National 2	7	0	0	0	0	0	–		0	0	7	0
Lyon B	2021–22	Championnat National 2	22	2	0	0	0	0	–		0	0	22	2
Lyon B	2022–23	Championnat National 2	25	3	0	0	0	0	–		0	0	25	3
Lyon B	Total		54	5	0	0	0	0	0	0	0	0	54	5
Hapoel Tel Aviv	2023–24	Israeli Premier League	7	0	0	0	2	0	–		1	0	10	0
Hapoel Tel Aviv	Total		7	0	0	0	2	0	–		1	0	10	0
Hapoel Acre	2023–24	Liga Leumit	15	0	0	0	0	0	–		0	0	15	0
Career total			76	5	0	0	2	0	0	0	1	0	79	5

== See also ==
- List of Jews in Sports
