= Orel Baye =

Israeli footballer

Personal information
- Date of birth: 2 March 2004 (age 22)
- Place of birth: Ness Ziona, Israel
- Height: 1.78 m (5 ft 10 in)
- Position: Winger

Team information
- Current team: Hapoel Petah Tikva (on loan from Maccabi Tel Aviv)

Youth career
- 2012–2014: Sektzia Ness Ziona
- 2014–2022: Maccabi Tel Aviv

Senior career*
Years	Team	Apps	(Gls)
2022–	Maccabi Tel Aviv	2	(0)
2023–2024	→ Hapoel Hadera (loan)	7	(0)
2024	→ Hapoel Rishon LeZion (loan)	16	(4)
2024–2025	→ Hapoel Ramat HaSharon (loan)	34	(9)
2025–2026	→ Hapoel Jerusalem (loan)	5	(0)
2026–	→ Hapoel Petah Tikva (loan)	5	(0)

International career
2020	Israel U16	3	(1)
2021–2022	Israel U19	7	(1)
Medal record
Representing Israel U-19
UEFA European Under-19 Championship
Runner-up	2022 Slovakia	Team
- * Club domestic league appearances and goals as of 23 June 2026

Orel Baye (or Baaia, Hebrew: אוראל באייה; born 2 March 2004) is an Israeli professional footballer who plays as a winger for Israeli Premier League club Hapoel Petah Tikva on loan from Maccabi Tel Aviv.

== Early life ==
Baye was born and raised in Ness Ziona, Israel, to a family of Ethiopian-Jewish background.

== Club career ==
=== Maccabi Tel Aviv ===
Baye made his senior debut with Israeli side Maccabi Tel Aviv on 3 March 2022 at the 4–0 win against Maccabi Jaffa at the Israeli State Cup.

On 10 May 2022 he also made his senior Israeli Premier League club line-up debut for Maccabi Tel Aviv at the 2–1 win against Maccabi Haifa

== International career ==
He plays for the Israel national under-19 team since 2021.

== Career statistics ==
=== Club ===
As of 1 June 2024

Club	Season	League			State Cup		Toto Cup		Continental		Other		Total	
Club	Season	Division	Apps	Goals	Apps	Goals	Apps	Goals	Apps	Goals	Apps	Goals	Apps	Goals
Maccabi Tel Aviv	2021–22	Israeli Premier League	2	0	1	0	0	0	0	0	0	0	3	0
Hapoel Hadera	2023–24	Israeli Premier League	7	0	0	0	2	0	0	0	0	0	9	0
Hapoel Rishon LeZion	2023–24	Liga Leumit	16	4	1	0	0	0	0	0	0	0	17	4
Hapoel Ramat HaSharon	2024–25	Liga Leumit	34	9	3	2	0	0	0	0	0	0	37	11
Career total			59	13	5	2	2	0	0	0	0	0	29	4

== See also ==
- List of Jewish footballers
- List of Jews in sports
- List of Israelis
