= Roey Ben Shimon =

Israeli footballer

Personal information
- Full name: Roey Ben Shimon
- Date of birth: December 4, 2000 (age 25)
- Place of birth: Beit Ezra, Israel
- Height: 1.85 m (6 ft 1 in)
- Position: Forward

Team information
- Current team: Hapoel Rishon LeZion
- Number: 11

Youth career
- 2009–2018: F.C. Ashdod
- 2018–2020: Bnei Yehuda

Senior career*
Years	Team	Apps	(Gls)
2020–2024	Bnei Yehuda	57	(8)
2023	→ F.C. Ashdod (loan)	4	(1)
2023	→ Hapoel Kfar Saba (loan)	12	(3)
2023–2024	→ Beitar Jerusalem (loan)	3	(0)
2024–2025	Maccabi Herzliya	25	(9)
2025–2026	Elbasani	10	(0)
2026	Hapoel Kfar Shalem	11	(1)
2026–	Hapoel Rishon LeZion	0	(0)

International career
2020	Israel U21	1	(0)
- * Club domestic league appearances and goals as of 1 June 2026

Roey Ben-Shimon (Hebrew: רועי בן-שמעון) is an Israeli footballer who currently plays for Liga Leumit club Hapoel Rishon LeZion.
