= Jared Khasa =

French footballer (born 1997)

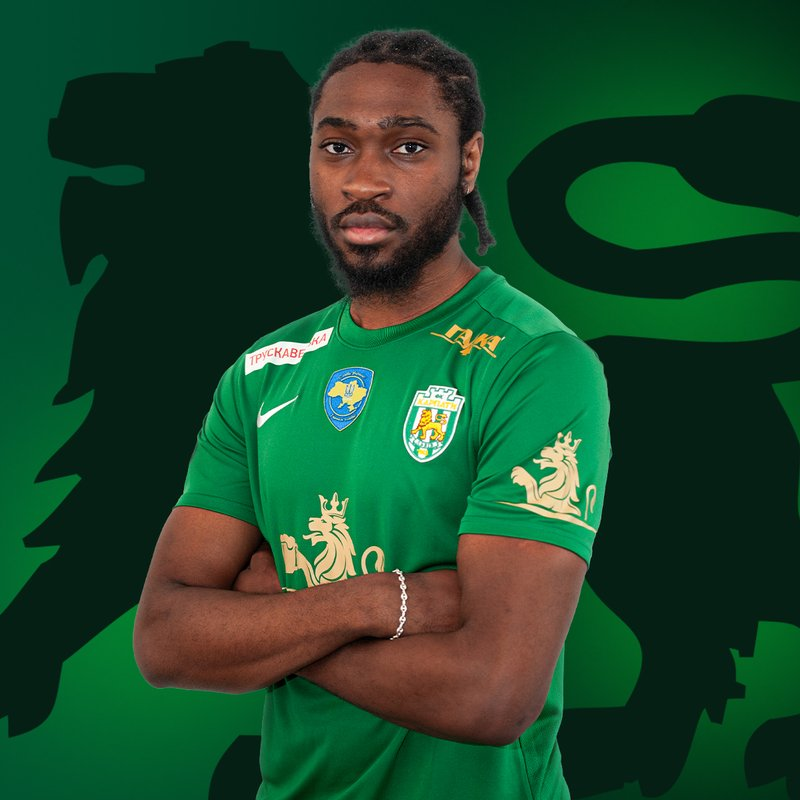
- Khasa with Karpaty Lviv

Personal information
- Date of birth: 4 November 1997 (age 29)
- Place of birth: Kinshasa, DR Congo
- Height: 1.87 m (6 ft 2 in)
- Position: Winger

Senior career*
Years	Team	Apps	(Gls)
2015–2016	Le Havre B	3	(1)
2016–2022	Sion II	68	(8)
2016–2022	Sion	50	(4)
2016	→ Fribourg (loan)	6	(1)
2022	→ Pau (loan)	11	(0)
2022–2023	AEL Limassol	35	(1)
2023	Maccabi Petah Tikva	4	(0)
2024	Karpaty Lviv	8	(0)
2024–2025	Bashundhara Kings	2	(2)
2025–2026	Nîmes	24	(3)
- * Club domestic league appearances and goals as of 29 May 2026

Jared Khasa (born 4 November 1997) is a French professional footballer who plays as a winger for Championnat National 1 club Nîmes.

== Career ==
Khasa made his professional debut with Sion in a 0–0 Swiss Super League tie on 21 October 2018.

On 12 January 2022, Khasa joined Ligue 2 side Pau on loan until the end of the 2021–22 season.

On 14 August 2023 signed for Maccabi Petah Tikva.

== Personal life ==
Born in Kinshasa, Khasa is Congolese by descent.
