= List of Israeli football transfers summer 2024 =

This is a list of Israeli football transfers for the 2024 Summer Transfer Window.

== Ligat Ha'Al ==
=== Beitar Jerusalem ===
In:

No.	Pos.	Nation	Player
—	GK	ISR	Raz Karmi (from Hapoel Petah Tikva)
—	DF	ISR	Uri Dahan (from Maccabi Haifa, previously loaned)
—	DF	ISR	Gil Cohen (from F.C. Ashdod)
—	DF	ISR	Raz Baruchian (loan return from Hapoel Kfar Saba)
—	DF	FRA	Jean Marcelin (from (France) Girondins de Bordeaux)
—	DF	ISR	Liel Deri (loan return from Hapoel Ra'anana)
—	MF	ISR	Yarin Levi (on loan from Maccabi Haifa)
—	MF	NCL	Jekob Jeno (from (France) Grenoble)
—	FW	ISR	Ayi Silva Kangani (from Austria Wien)
—	FW	GHA	Patrick Twumasi (from (Cyprus) Pafos)

Out:

No.	Pos.	Nation	Player
—	GK	ISR	Roy Sason (on loan to Bnei Yehuda)
—	DF	ISR	Edi Gotlieb (Retired)
—	DF	ISR	Ben Bitton (Free agent)
—	DF	BUL	Plamen Galabov (to Maccabi Petah Tikva)
—	DF	ISR	Omer Korsia (to Maccabi Herzliya)
—	DF	ISR	David Houja (to (United States) FIU Panthers)
—	DF	ISR	Orel Dgani (to Hapoel Haifa)
—	MF	ISR	Dan Azaria (Free agent)
—	MF	GEO	Nika Khorkheli (loan return to (Georgia (country)) Samgurali Tsqaltubo)
—	MF	ISR	Yuval Ashkenazi (Free agent)
—	MF	ISR	Lian Edri (to Tzeirei Umm al-Fahm)
—	FW	NGA	Fred Friday (Free agent)
—	FW	ISR	Rom Alyagon (Free agent)
—	FW	ISR	Roey Ben Shimon (to Maccabi Herzliya, previously loaned from Bnei Yehuda)

=== Bnei Sakhnin ===
In:

No.	Pos.	Nation	Player
—	DF	ISR	Naftali Balay (on loan from Maccabi Netanya)
—	DF	ISR	Eyad Abu Abaid (from Hapoel Be'er Sheva)
—	DF	UKR	Daniel Joulani (on loan from Maccabi Petah Tikva)
—	MF	ISR	Omer Abuhav (from Hapoel Ramat Gan)
—	MF	CMR	Jeando Fuchs (from (England) Peterborough United)
—	FW	ISR	Jubaiyer Bushanek (from Hapoel Nof HaGalil)
—	FW	GEO	Paata Gudushauri (from (Georgia (country)) Dinamo Batumi)
—	FW	ISR	Ahmed Salman (on loan from Maccabi Netanya)
—	FW	MAD	Alexandre Ramalingom (from (Azerbaijan) Sabail)
—	FW	NGA	Daniel Chinomso (from Hapoel Kfar Saba)

Out:

No.	Pos.	Nation	Player
—	DF	ISR	Rotem Keller (loan return to Maccabi Netanya)
—	DF	ISR	Ido Vaier (to Hapoel Tel Aviv)
—	DF	ISR	Aviv Solomon (Free agent)
—	DF	ISR	Taleb Tawatha (Free agent)
—	DF	ISR	Hassan Hilu (to (Japan) Júbilo Iwata)
—	MF	ISR	Saher Taji (to Maccabi Netanya)
—	MF	ROU	Adrian Păun (loan return to Hapoel Be'er Sheva)
—	MF	BEL	Stéphane Oméonga (Free agent)
—	MF	ISR	Gaby Joury (Free agent)
—	FW	ISR	Muflah Shalata (Free agent)
—	FW	ISR	Mohammed Shaker (to Maccabi Bnei Reineh, previously loaned from Ironi Kiryat Shmona)
—	FW	ARG	Claudio Spinelli (Free agent)
—	FW	ISR	Joseph Ganda (Free agent)
—	FW	ISR	Zahi Ahmed (loan return to Hapoel Be'er Sheva)
—	FW	ISR	Dor Hugi (to Hapoel Haifa)
—	FW	NGA	Chinemerem Godwin (on loan to Hapoel Umm al-Fahm)
—	FW	NGA	Daniel Chinomso (on loan to Hapoel Ramat Gan)
—	FW	ISR	Anis Porat Ayash (to Maccabi Tel Aviv, and later loaned back)

=== F.C. Ashdod ===
In:

No.	Pos.	Nation	Player
—	DF	ISR	Shahar Rosen (on loan from Maccabi Tel Aviv)
—	DF	DOM	Luiyi de Lucas (from (Cyprus) AEL Limassol)
—	MF	ISR	Liav Preda (from Hapoel Afula)
—	MF	GHA	Emmanuel Agyei (from (Ghana) Dreams)
—	MF	ISR	Mohammed Amer (from F.C. Kafr Qasim)
—	MF	GHA	Godfred Atuahene (from (Ghana) Dreams)
—	FW	ISR	Shlomi Azulay (from Maccabi Bnei Reineh)
—	FW	ISR	Stav Nahmani (from Maccabi Haifa, previously loaned)
—	FW	ISR	Asil Kna'ani (from F.C. Kafr Qasim)

Out:

No.	Pos.	Nation	Player
—	DF	ISR	Gil Cohen (to F.C. Ashdod)
—	DF	SCO	Clark Robertson (to (Scotland) Dundee)
—	DF	GHA	Montari Kamaheni (Free agent)
—	DF	ISR	Shaked Hakmon (on loan to Maccabi Herzliya)
—	MF	ISR	Michael Ohana (Free agent)
—	MF	ISR	Shlomi Azulay (to Hapoel Ra'anana)
—	MF	ISR	Sami Kiwan (to Hapoel Nof HaGalil)
—	MF	GHA	Godfred Atuahene (on loan to F.C. Kafr Qasim)
—	FW	COD	Jordan Botaka (to Ironi Tiberias)
—	FW	NGA	Ezekiel Henty (to Maccabi Bnei Reineh)

=== Hapoel Be'er Sheva ===
In:

No.	Pos.	Nation	Player
—	GK	ISR	Ben Gordin (from Hapoel Ramat Gan)
—	DF	ISR	Guy Mizrahi (from Maccabi Netanya)
—	DF	ISR	Or Blorian (loan return from Hapoel Tel Aviv)
—	DF	ISR	Matan Baltaxa (from Maccabi Tel Aviv)
—	DF	CIV	Abdoul Coulibaly (on loan form Hapoel Be'er Sheva)
—	MF	ISR	Eliel Peretz (from (Cyprus) Apollon Limassol)
—	MF	ISR	Liran Rigen (loan return from F.C. Kafr Qasim)
—	MF	ZAM	Kings Kangwa (from (Serbia) Red Star Belgrade)
—	MF	BRA	Lucas Ventura (from (Portugal) Portimonense)
—	FW	ISR	Zahi Ahmed (loan return from Bnei Sakhnin)
—	MF	ISR	Dan Biton (from Maccabi Tel Aviv)
—	FW	ISR	Samer Farhud (from Hapoel Nof HaGalil)
—	FW	CMR	Paul Garita (from (Saudi Arabia) Al-Faisaly)

Out:

No.	Pos.	Nation	Player
—	GK	ISR	Tom Amos (to (Sweden) Ljungskile SK)
—	GK	ISR	Re'em Golan (on loan to Maccabi Ironi Ashdod)
—	DF	ISR	Harel Shalom (to Hapoel Hadera)
—	DF	ISR	Eyad Abu Abaid (to Bnei Sakhnin)
—	DF	ISR	Máximo Levi (to (Argentina) San Martín de Tucumán)
—	DF	ISR	Ari Merenstein (to Maccabi Jaffa)
—	MF	GAB	André Poko (Free agent)
—	MF	ISR	Eden Shamir (to Maccabi Petah Tikva)
—	MF	NED	Imran Oulad Omar (to (Armenia) Noah)
—	MF	ISR	Ilay Madmon (on loan to Hapoel Jerusalem)
—	MF	ISR	Liran Rigen (to Hapoel Kfar Saba)
—	FW	ROU	Adrian Păun (to (Romania) CFR Cluj, previously loaned to Bnei Sakhnin)
—	FW	COL	Deinner Quiñones (to Maccabi Petah Tikva)
—	FW	KAZ	Artur Shushenachev (on loan to (Russia) Sochi)

=== Hapoel Hadera ===
In:

No.	Pos.	Nation	Player
—	GK	ISR	Ofek Antman (Free transfer)
—	DF	ISR	Harel Shalom (from Hapoel Be'er Sheva)
—	MF	GUI	Abdoulaye Cissé (from (Serbia) Novi Pazar)
—	DF	ISR	David Tiram (from Hapoel Ramat HaSharon)
—	DF	ISR	Ben Azar Cohen (from F.C. Tzeirei Tayibe)
—	DF	ISR	Lisav Eissat (on loan from Maccabi Haifa)
—	MF	ISR	Yadin Lugasi (from (Azerbaijan) Sabail FK)
—	FW	FRA	Ibrahim Sangaré (from (Cyprus) Othellos Athienou)
—	FW	ISR	Amir Berkovits (from Hapoel Petah Tikva)
—	FW	ISR	Yahli Shabo (from Maccabi Petah Tikva)
—	FW	ISR	Omer Senior (from Hapoel Tel Aviv)

Out:

No.	Pos.	Nation	Player
—	GK	ISR	Nikola Đurković (on loan to Hapoel Acre)
—	DF	CIV	Souleymane Coulibaly (Free agent)
—	DF	CRO	Josip Tomašević (to (Romania) Oțelul Galați)
—	DF	ISR	Ron Unger (on loan to Maccabi Bnei Reineh)
—	DF	ISR	Aviv Lin (on loan to Hapoel Ra'anana)
—	DF	NGA	Philip Ipole (to Hapoel Acre)
—	DF	ISR	David Tiram (to Hapoel Ramat HaSharon)
—	MF	BEL	Samy Bourard (Free agent)
—	MF	ISR	Tamir Glazer (to Maccabi Petah Tikva, previously loaned from Maccabi Tel Aviv)
—	MF	ISR	Niv Gotlieb (to (Cyprus) Enosis Neon Paralimni)
—	MF	ISR	Sa'ar Schwarz (on loan to Hapoel Afula)
—	FW	ISR	Elad Madmon (to Maccabi Tel Aviv)

=== Hapoel Haifa ===
In:

No.	Pos.	Nation	Player
—	DF	ISR	Tamir Arbel (on loan from Maccabi Haifa)
—	DF	ISR	Orel Dgani (from Beitar Jerusalem)
—	MF	BFA	Dramane Salou (from (Armenia) Urartu)
—	MF	ISR	Yonatan Farber (from Hapoel Ra'anana)
—	MF	ISR	Roy Nawi (on loan from Maccabi Tel Aviv)
—	MF	MLI	Thiemoko Diarra (from (France) Reims B)
—	FW	ISR	Dor Hugi (from Bnei Sakhnin)

Out:

No.	Pos.	Nation	Player
—	GK	ISR	Amit Suiri (to Hapoel Afula)
—	DF	ISR	Hatem Abd Elhamed (to Ironi Tiberias)
—	DF	BLR	Denis Polyakov (to (Belarus) Dinamo Minsk)
—	MF	ISR	Tomer Yosefi (loan return to Hapoel Be'er Sheva)
—	MF	ISR	Yasmao Cabeda (to Maccabi Jaffa)
—	FW	BRA	Felipe Santos (to (Azerbaijan) Araz-Naxçıvan)
—	FW	ISR	Eden Ben Simon (to Hapoel Acre)
—	FW	ISR	Oded Chekol (to Hapoel Acre)
—	FW	ISR	Niv Tubul (on loan to Ironi Tiberias)

=== Hapoel Jerusalem ===
In:

No.	Pos.	Nation	Player
—	GK	MKD	Marko Alchevski (from (North Macedonia) Brera Strumica)
—	DF	ISR	Yonathan Laish (on loan from Maccabi Haifa)
—	MF	ISR	Liel Chane (from Sektzia Ness Ziona)
—	MF	ISR	Yanai Distelfeld (from Maccabi Haifa)
—	MF	ISR	Ilay Madmon (on loan from Hapoel Be'er Sheva)
—	FW	ISR	Matan Hozez (from Maccabi Tel Aviv)
—	FW	NGA	Ibeh Ransom (from (Armenia) Ararat Yerevan)
—	FW	NGA	Andrew Idoko (from (Nigeria) Katsina United)
—	FW	SEN	Samba Diallo (on loan from (Ukraine) Dynamo Kyiv)

Out:

No.	Pos.	Nation	Player
—	GK	NGA	Adebayo Adeleye (to (Cyprus) Enosis Neon Paralimni)
—	GK	ISR	Ilay Tovim (on loan to Maccabi Jerusalem)
—	DF	ISR	Yorai Maliach (to Hapoel Rishon LeZion)
—	MF	ISR	Nadav Nidam (loan return to Maccabi Tel Aviv)
—	MF	ANG	Capita (loan return to (Portugal) Estrela Amadora)
—	MF	ISR	Tomer Altman (to Hapoel Petah Tikva)
—	FW	ISR	Matan Hozez (loan return to Maccabi Tel Aviv)
—	FW	ISR	Or Roizman (to Maccabi Petah Tikva, his player card still belongs to Maccabi Tel Aviv)
—	FW	ISR	Karem Zoabi (to (Portugal) Rio Ave)
—	FW	EST	Rauno Sappinen (to (Estonia) Flora)

=== Ironi Kiryat Shmona ===
In:

No.	Pos.	Nation	Player
—	DF	ISR	Salah Hussein (from Hapoel Nof HaGalil)
—	DF	ISR	Shon Edri (on loan from Maccabi Tel Aviv)
—	DF	ISR	Denis Kulikov (on loan from Maccabi Netanya)
—	MF	ISR	Lidor Cohen (from (Thailand) Trat)
—	MF	GUI	Sékou Tidiany Bangoura (on loan from (Turkey) İstanbul Başakşehir)
—	MF	PAN	Cristian Martínez (on loan from (Panama) Plaza Amador)
—	MF	ISR	Nadav Nidam (on loan from Maccabi Tel Aviv)
—	FW	NGA	Peter Onyekachi (from Hapoel Ramat HaSharon, previously loaned)
—	FW	GNB	Jardel (from (Portugal) Vizela)
—	FW	ISR	Hamza Shibli (on loan from Maccabi Haifa)

Out:

No.	Pos.	Nation	Player
—	DF	ISR	Alaa Jafar (to F.C. Kafr Qasim)
—	DF	ISR	Ziv Leigh (to Hapoel Migdal HaEmek)
—	MF	CMR	Georges Mandjeck (Free agent)
—	MF	ISR	Roy Harel (on loan to Hapoel Kfar Saba)
—	FW	NGA	Evo Ememe (Free agent)
—	FW	ISR	Mohammed Shaker (to Maccabi Bnei Reineh, previously loaned to Bnei Sakhnin)
—	FW	NGA	Peter Onyekachi (to Hapoel Acre)
—	FW	ISR	Guy Ben Lulu (to Hapoel Umm al-Fahm)

=== Ironi Tiberias ===
In:

No.	Pos.	Nation	Player
—	GK	ISR	Daniel Tenenbaum (from Maccabi Tel Aviv)
—	DF	CZE	Ondřej Bačo (from (Hungary) Diósgyőri VTK)
—	DF	ISR	Hatem Abd Elhamed (from Hapoel Haifa)
—	MF	ISR	Feras Abu Akel (from (Azerbaijan) Gabala)
—	MF	ISR	Yonatan Teper (from Maccabi Petah Tikva)
—	MF	ISR	Bassam Zarora (on loan from Maccabi Netanya)
—	FW	ISR	Nawaf Bazea (from Maccabi Bnei Reineh)
—	FW	UKR	Stanislav Bilenkyi (from Maccabi Netanya)
—	FW	COD	Jordan Botaka (from F.C. Ashdod)
—	FW	ISR	Niv Tubul (on loan from Hapoel Haifa)

Out:

No.	Pos.	Nation	Player
—	GK	ISR	Tomer Livitanov (to Maccabi Petah Tikva)
—	GK	ISR	Dan Drori (to Hapoel Kfar Saba)
—	DF	ISR	Yakov Ababa (to Bnei Yehuda)
—	DF	ISR	Namir Aga (Free agent)
—	MF	ISR	Itay Zada (to Hapoel Rishon LeZion, his player card still belongs to Hapoel Jerusalem)
—	MF	ISR	Amir Lavi (Free agent)
—	MF	ISR	Reef Mesika (to Hapoel Kfar Shalem)
—	FW	BRA	Julio César (to Hapoel Kfar Saba)
—	FW	ISR	Ahmed Abed (to Hapoel Tel Aviv)
—	FW	ISR	Timor Avitan (Free agent)

=== Maccabi Bnei Reineh ===
In:

No.	Pos.	Nation	Player
—	DF	ISR	Ron Unger (on loan from Hapoel Hadera)
—	DF	CRO	Karlo Bručić (from (Slovenia) Koper)
—	MF	ISR	Guy Hadida (from (Hungary) Zalaegerszegi)
—	MF	ISR	Ihab Ghanayem (from Hapoel Tel Aviv)
—	MF	ISR	Sa'ar Fadida (from (Slovenia) Olimpija Ljubljana)
—	MF	ISR	Evyatar Barak (from Hapoel Afula)
—	FW	ISR	Mohammed Shaker (from Ironi Kiryat Shmona)
—	FW	CGO	Leroy Mondzenga (from (Tunisia) ES Métlaoui)
—	FW	NGA	Ezekiel Henty (from F.C. Ashdod)
—	FW	ISR	Sayed Abu Farchi (on loan from Maccabi Tel Aviv)
—	FW	ISR	Fadeel Zbedat (from Maccabi Jaffa)

Out:

No.	Pos.	Nation	Player
—	GK	ISR	Mahran Ghaddir (Free agent)
—	DF	ISR	Niv Fliter (to (Cyprus) Enosis Neon Paralimni)
—	DF	ISR	Dor Elo (Free agent)
—	DF	ISR	Ashraf Rabah (to Hapoel Acre)
—	MF	PAN	Freddy Góndola (to (Kazakhstan) Aktobe)
—	MF	ISR	Amit Meir (loan return to Bnei Yehuda)
—	MF	ISR	Bassel Amer (to Hapoel Kafr Kanna)
—	FW	ISR	Shlomi Azulay (to F.C. Ashdod)
—	FW	ISR	Nawaf Bazea (to Ironi Tiberias)
—	FW	ISR	Loai Halaf (to (Romania) UTA Arad)
—	FW	ISR	Osher Eliyahu (loan return to Maccabi Netanya)
—	FW	VEN	Freddy Vargas (to Maccabi Netanya)
—	FW	ISR	Mohamed Khatib (F.C. Kafr Qasim)
—	FW	HUN	Márk Koszta (to (Greece) Volos, previously loaned from (Russia) Torpedo Moscow)

=== Maccabi Haifa ===
In:

No.	Pos.	Nation	Player
—	GK	ARG	Tomás Sultani (from (Argentina) Arsenal de Sarandí)
—	GK	UKR	Heorhiy Yermakov (from (Ukraine) Oleksandriya)
—	DF	ISR	Roey Elimelech (loan return from Hapoel Petah Tikva)
—	DF	UKR	Oleksandr Syrota (on loan from (Ukraine) Dynamo Kyiv)
—	DF	COD	Vital Nsimba (from (France) Girondins de Bordeaux)
—	DF	BRA	Pedrão (from (Portugal) Portimonense)
—	MF	ISR	Dia Saba (loan return from (United Arab Emirates) Emirates Club)
—	MF	ISR	Hamza Shibli (loan return from Hapoel Petah Tikva)
—	MF	ISR	Ethan Azoulay (from Maccabi Netanya)
—	MF	ISR	Liam Hermesh (loan return from Hapoel Afula)
—	MF	ESP	Matías Nahuel (from (Poland) Śląsk Wrocław)
—	FW	CUW	Xander Severina (from (Serbia) FK Partizan)

Out:

No.	Pos.	Nation	Player
—	GK	ISR	Itamar Nitzan (Retired)
—	DF	ISR	Uri Dahan (to Beitar Jerusalem, previously loaned)
—	DF	FRA	Pierre Cornud (to (France) AS Saint-Étienne)
—	DF	ISR	Lisav Eissat (on loan to Hapoel Hadera)
—	DF	CRO	Lorenco Šimić (on loan to (Italy) Bari)
—	DF	SWE	Daniel Sundgren (to (Greece) Volos)
—	MF	SUR	Tjaronn Chery (to (Belgium) Royal Antwerp, previously loaned to (Netherlands) NEC)
—	MF	ISR	Yarin Levi (on loan to Beitar Jerusalem)
—	MF	ISR	Maor Levi (to Maccabi Netanya, previously loaned to Maccabi Petah Tikva)
—	MF	ISR	Yanai Distelfeld (to Hapoel Jerusalem)
—	MF	ANG	Show (on loan to (United States) FC Dallas)
—	MF	ISR	Ziv Ben Shimol (on loan to Bnei Yehuda Tel Aviv)
—	MF	ISR	Sarel Cohen (on loan to Hapoel Rishon LeZion)
—	MF	ISR	Hamza Shibli (on loan to Ironi Kiryat Shmona)
—	MF	ISR	Goni Naor (on loan to Hapoel Tel Aviv)
—	MF	ISR	Lior Kasa (on loan to (Italy) Genoa)
—	FW	ISR	Anan Khalaily (to (Belgium) Union SG)
—	FW	ISR	Stav Nahmani (to F.C. Ashdod, previously loaned)
—	FW	RUS	Daniil Lesovoy (loan return to (Russia) Dynamo Moscow)
—	FW	ISR	Tomer Hemed (Retired)
—	FW	ISR	Suf Podgoreanu (on loan to (Netherlands) Heracles)
—	FW	HAI	Frantzdy Pierrot (to (Greece) AEK Athens)

=== Maccabi Netanya ===
In:

No.	Pos.	Nation	Player
—	DF	ISR	Rotem Keller (on loan from Bnei Sakhnin)
—	DF	ISR	Raz Meir (from Hapoel Tel Aviv)
—	DF	CMR	Mohammed Djetei (from (Spain) Albacete Balompié)
—	DF	ISR	Obeida Khattab (from Maccabi Petah Tikva)
—	MF	ISR	Aviv Kanrik (loan return from Shimshon Tel Aviv)
—	MF	ISR	Maor Levi (from Maccabi Haifa)
—	MF	ISR	Saher Taji (from Bnei Sakhnin)
—	MF	GNB	Janio Bikel (from (Turkey) Gaziantep)
—	FW	ISR	Osher Eliyahu (loan return from Maccabi Bnei Reineh)
—	FW	POR	Heriberto Tavares (from (Portugal) Estoril)
—	FW	VEN	Freddy Vargas (from Maccabi Bnei Reineh)
—	FW	ISR	Loai Halaf (from (Romania) UTA Arad)

Out:

No.	Pos.	Nation	Player
—	DF	ISR	Naftali Balay (on loan to Bnei Sakhnin)
—	DF	FRA	Nassim Ouammou (to (France) Sochaux)
—	DF	GEO	Saba Khvadagiani (on loan to (Georgia (country)) Dinamo Tbilisi)
—	DF	ISR	Guy Mizrahi (to Hapoel Be'er Sheva)
—	DF	ISR	Matan Levi (on loan to Hapoel Ramat Gan)
—	DF	ISR	Denis Kulikov (on loan to Ironi Kiryat Shmona)
—	DF	ISR	Joel Abu Hanna (Free agent)
—	MF	ISR	Ethan Azoulay (to Maccabi Haifa)
—	MF	CMR	Boris Enow (to (United States) D.C. United)
—	MF	ISR	Aviv Avraham (to (Cyprus) AEL Limassol)
—	MF	ISR	Liran Rotman (to Hapoel Tel Aviv)
—	MF	ISR	Niv Livnat (to Hapoel Kfar Saba, previously loaned to Hapoel Ramat HaSharon)
—	MF	ISR	Bassam Zarora (on loan to Ironi Tiberias)
—	FW	UKR	Stanislav Bilenkyi (to Ironi Tiberias)
—	FW	GHA	Ibrahim Tanko (Free agent)
—	FW	ISR	Ahmed Salman (on loan to Bnei Sakhnin)
—	FW	CRC	Rachid Chirino (to (Costa Rica) Deportivo Saprissa, previously loaned to Hapoel Umm al-Fahm)

=== Maccabi Petah Tikva ===
In:

No.	Pos.	Nation	Player
—	GK	ISR	Tomer Livitanov (from Ironi Tiberias)
—	GK	ISR	Yoav Arikha (from Hapoel Umm al-Fahm)
—	DF	BUL	Plamen Galabov (from Beitar Jerusalem)
—	DF	ISR	Gal Matouk (loan return from Hapoel Ramat HaSharon)
—	MF	ISR	Tamir Glazer (from Maccabi Tel Aviv)
—	MF	ISR	Idan Vered (from Hapoel Petah Tikva)
—	MF	ISR	Eden Shamir (from Hapoel Be'er Sheva)
—	MF	ISR	Eyal Golasa (from Maccabi Tel Aviv)
—	MF	ISR	Harel Shasha (on loan from Hapoel Ramat Gan)
—	FW	ISR	Or Roizman (on loan from Maccabi Tel Aviv)
—	FW	MDA	Vitalie Damașcan (from (Romania) Sepsi OSK)
—	FW	COL	Deinner Quiñones (from Hapoel Be'er Sheva)

Out:

No.	Pos.	Nation	Player
—	GK	ISR	Ofek Melika (to Maccabi Tel Aviv)
—	GK	ISR	Robi Levkovich (to Hapoel Tel Aviv)
—	GK	ISR	Dor Hebron (to Hapoel Ra'anana, previously loaned to Hapoel Kfar Saba)
—	DF	ISR	Tomer Levy (Free agent)
—	DF	ISR	Ronny Laufer (to Hapoel Ramat Gan, his player card still belongs to Maccabi Haifa)
—	DF	ISR	Hadar Fuchs (on loan to F.C. Kafr Qasim)
—	DF	BEN	Moïse Adiléhou (to (France) Laval)
—	DF	ISR	Obeida Khattab (to Maccabi Netanya)
—	MF	ISR	Maor Levi (to Maccabi Netanya, previously loaned from Maccabi Haifa)
—	MF	ISR	Yanai Ben Shushan (to Hapoel Kfar Saba)
—	MF	NGA	Ibraheem Jabaar (loan return to (South Africa) Stellenbosch)
—	MF	ISR	Aviel Zargari (loan return to Maccabi Haifa)
—	MF	ISR	Yonatan Teper (to Ironi Tiberias)
—	FW	ISR	Roy Korine (to Hapoel Tel Aviv, his player card still belongs to Maccabi Netanya)
—	FW	ISR	Yahli Shabo (to Hapoel Hadera)
—	FW	ISR	Idan Gorno (to (United States) Charlotte)
—	FW	MLI	Saliou Guindo (to (Greece) Lamia)
—	FW	ISR	Ben Sahar (to Hapoel Tel Aviv)
—	FW	ISR	Ariel Lugasi (on loan to Maccabi Herzliya)

=== Maccabi Tel Aviv ===
In:

No.	Pos.	Nation	Player
—	GK	ISR	Ofek Melika (from Maccabi Petah Tikva)
—	DF	ISR	Shahar Rosen (loan return from Bnei Yehuda)
—	DF	NED	Tyrese Asante (from (Netherlands) ADO Den Haag)
—	DF	SRB	Nemanja Stojić (from (Serbia) Red Star Belgrade)
—	DF	ISR	Stav Lemkin (on loan from (Ukraine) Shakhtar Donetsk)
—	MF	ISR	Nadav Nidam (loan return from Hapoel Jerusalem)
—	MF	ISR	Roy Nawi (loan return from Hapoel Petah Tikva)
—	MF	ISR	Sagiv Yehezkel (from (Turkey) Antalyaspor)
—	MF	MLI	Issouf Sissokho (from (France) Girondins de Bordeaux)
—	FW	ISR	Elad Madmon (from Hapoel Hadera)
—	FW	ISR	Sayed Abu Farchi (loan return from F.C. Kafr Qasim)
—	FW	ISR	Matan Hozez (loan return from Hapoel Jerusalem)
—	FW	ISR	Hisham Layous (from Hapoel Tel Aviv)
—	FW	BRA	Weslley Patati (from (Brazil) Santos)
—	FW	ISR	Anis Porat Ayash (from Bnei Sakhnin, and later loaned back)

Out:

No.	Pos.	Nation	Player
—	GK	ISR	Daniel Tenenbaum (to Ironi Tiberias)
—	GK	PAN	Orlando Mosquera (to (Saudi Arabia) Al-Fayha)
—	GK	ISR	Tomer Alon (on loan to Maccabi Jaffa)
—	DF	ISR	Sheran Yeini (Retired)
—	DF	ISR	Shahar Rosen (on loan to F.C. Ashdod)
—	DF	NED	Derrick Luckassen (to (Cyprus) Pafos FC)
—	DF	ESP	Enric Saborit (to (Turkey) Gaziantep)
—	DF	ISR	Adir Cordoba (on loan to Hapoel Nir Ramat HaSharon)
—	DF	ISR	Najwan Khatib (on loan to Hapoel Nir Ramat HaSharon)
—	DF	ISR	Ali Khatib (to Hapoel Acre)
—	DF	ISR	Matan Baltaxa (to Hapoel Be'er Sheva)
—	MF	ISR	Tamir Glazer (to Maccabi Petah Tikva, previously loaned to Hapoel Hadera)
—	MF	POR	Kiko Bondoso (on loan to (Portugal) Rio Ave)
—	MF	ISR	Eden Kartsev (to (China) Shenzhen Peng City, his player card still belongs to (Turkey) İstanbul Başakşehir)
—	MF	ISR	Roy Zarzevski (on loan to Hapoel Nir Ramat HaSharon)
—	MF	ISR	Roy Nawi (on loan to Hapoel Haifa)
—	MF	ISR	Eyal Golasa (to Maccabi Petah Tikva)
—	MF	ISR	Nadav Nidam (on loan to Ironi Kiryat Shmona)
—	MF	ISR	Yonatan Cohen (to (Australia) Melbourne City)
—	MF	ISR	Dan Biton (to Hapoel Be'er Sheva)
—	FW	ISR	Ori Azo (on loan to Hapoel Nir Ramat HaSharon)
—	FW	ANG	Felício Milson (to (Serbia) Red Star Belgrade)
—	FW	ISR	Amit Zur (on loan to Hapoel Nir Ramat HaSharon)
—	FW	ISR	Sayed Abu Farchi (on loan to Maccabi Bnei Reineh)
—	FW	ISR	Matan Hozez (to Hapoel Jerusalem)

== Liga Leumit ==
=== Bnei Yehuda ===
In:

No.	Pos.	Nation	Player
—	GK	ISR	Roy Sason (on loan from Beitar Jerusalem)
—	DF	ISR	Yakov Ababa (from Ironi Tiberias)
—	DF	ISR	Amit Cohen (from Maccabi Jaffa)
—	DF	ISR	Sahar Revivo (from Sektzia Ness Ziona)
—	DF	ISR	Omri Luzon (from Hapoel Umm al-Fahm)
—	DF	ISR	Dolev Azruel (from Hapoel Afula)
—	MF	COL	Yair Castro (from (Cyprus) AEZ Zakakiou)
—	MF	SCO	Alastair Reynolds (from (Cyprus) AEZ Zakakiou)
—	MF	ALB	Erisildo Smaci (from (Albania) Dinamo City)
—	MF	ISR	Amit Meir (loan return from Maccabi Bnei Reineh)
—	MF	ISR	Ziv Ben Shimol (on loan from Maccabi Haifa)
—	MF	ISR	Yuval Piven (loan return from Maccabi Sha'arayim)
—	MF	ISR	Samuel Broun (to Bnei Yehuda)
—	MF	ISR	Solomon Daniel (from Bnei Yehuda)
—	FW	ISR	Shoval Gozlan (from Hapoel Petah Tikva)
—	FW	ISR	Gil Itzhak (from Maccabi Jaffa)
—	FW	NGA	Mustapha Gbolahan (from (Albania) Kukësi)

Out:

No.	Pos.	Nation	Player
—	GK	ISR	Yehonatan Shabi (Free agent)
—	DF	CIV	Souleymane Fofana (to (Russia) Shinnik Yaroslavl)
—	DF	ISR	Shahar Rosen (loan return to Maccabi Tel Aviv)
—	DF	ISR	Sapir Itah (to Hapoel Kfar Saba)
—	DF	ISR	Idan Ratta (to Hapoel Kfar Saba)
—	DF	ISR	Yazan Nassar (to Hapoel Tel Aviv)
—	MF	GAM	Abubakar Barry (to Austria Wien)
—	MF	ISR	Shalev Daniel (to Hapoel Afula)
—	MF	NGA	Joseph Okoro (to (Belarus) Dinamo Minsk)
—	MF	ISR	Maor Biton (on loan to Hapoel Kfar Shalem)
—	MF	ISR	Amit Meir (to Hapoel Ramat Gan)
—	MF	ISR	Solomon Daniel (to Hapoel Kfar Shalem)
—	FW	ISR	Shahar Hirsh (to Hapoel Kfar Shalem)
—	FW	ISR	Michael Maman (to Maccabi Jaffa)
—	FW	ISR	Eyal Hen (to Hapoel Kfar Shalem)
—	FW	ISR	Hayford Adjei (to Hapoel Ra'anana)
—	FW	ISR	Roey Ben Shimon (to Maccabi Herzliya, previously loaned to Beitar Jerusalem)

=== F.C. Kafr Qasim ===
In:

No.	Pos.	Nation	Player
—	DF	ISR	Alaa Jafar (from Ironi Kiryat Shmona)
—	DF	ISR	Hadar Fuchs (on loan from Maccabi Petah Tikva)
—	MF	ISR	Shay Golan (from Hapoel Umm al-Fahm)
—	MF	ISR	Ryan Ashmuz (from Hapoel Nof HaGalil)
—	MF	ISR	Anas Dabour (from Ihud Bnei Shefa-'Amr)
—	MF	GHA	Godfred Atuahene (on loan from F.C. Ashdod)
—	FW	ISR	Mohamed Khatib (from Maccabi Bnei Reineh)
—	FW	ISR	Samah Mar'ab (from Hapoel Kafr Qasim)

Out:

No.	Pos.	Nation	Player
—	GK	ISR	Shalev Sharabi (Free agent)
—	DF	ISR	Noam Cohen (to Hapoel Petah Tikva)
—	DF	ISR	Ilay Shifki (to Shimshon Tel Aviv, previously loaned from Maccabi Petah Tikva)
—	MF	ISR	Liran Rigen (loan return to Hapoel Be'er Sheva)
—	MF	ISR	Mohammed Amer (to F.C. Ashdod)
—	FW	ISR	Sayed Abu Farchi (loan return to Maccabi Tel Aviv)
—	FW	ISR	Ido Elmshily (to Hapoel Nof HaGalil, previously loaned from Hapoel Tel Aviv)
—	FW	ISR	Guy Dahan (to Hapoel Nof HaGalil)
—	FW	ISR	Roy Doga (Free agent)
—	FW	PLE	Fadi Zidan (Free agent)
—	FW	ISR	Asil Kna'ani (to F.C. Ashdod)
—	FW	ISR	Nir Abergil (to F.C. Kiryat Yam)

=== Hapoel Acre ===
In:

No.	Pos.	Nation	Player
—	GK	ISR	Ariel Bardugo (from Hapoel Kfar Saba)
—	GK	ISR	Nikola Đurković (on loan from Hapoel Hadera)
—	DF	ISR	Aviv Bitton (from Maccabi Ata Bialik)
—	DF	ISR	Shalev Ben Muha (from Ironi Nesher)
—	DF	NGA	Philip Ipole (from Bnei Yehuda)
—	DF	ISR	Dan Sirkis (from Hapoel Ra'anana)
—	DF	ISR	Ali Khatib (from Maccabi Tel Aviv)
—	DF	ISR	Ashraf Rabah (from Maccabi Bnei Reineh)
—	MF	ISR	Inan Gonzalez (loan return from Hapoel Karmiel)
—	MF	CIV	Claude Kouakou (from Hapoel Ramat HaSharon)
—	MF	ISR	Neil Werthaim (from Maccabi Akhi Nazareth)
—	MF	ISR	Shon Weiss (from Hapoel Rishon LeZion)
—	MF	FRA	Romain Habran (from Hapoel Afula)
—	FW	ISR	Shahaf Sapir (loan return from F.C. Kiryat Yam)
—	FW	ISR	Eden Ben Simon (from Hapoel Haifa)
—	FW	NGA	Peter Onyekachi (from Ironi Kiryat Shmona)
—	FW	ISR	Bar Nawi (from Hapoel Petah Tikva)
—	FW	ISR	Amit Zenati (Free transfer)
—	FW	ISR	Oded Chekol (from Hapoel Haifa)

Out:

No.	Pos.	Nation	Player
—	GK	ISR	Razi Abu Hamdan (to Hapoel Kfar Saba)
—	GK	ISR	Nassim Hayek (to Nordia Jerusalem)
—	DF	ISR	Jeffrey Nisembaum (to Hapoel Kfar Saba)
—	DF	ISR	Nir Drori (to (United States) San Diego State Aztecs)
—	DF	ISR	Ahmad Shaban (to Hapoel Afula)
—	DF	ISR	Amir Ariely (Free agent)
—	MF	ISR	Ohad Hazut (to Hapoel Tel Aviv)
—	MF	ISR	Gitti Sofir (to (Azerbaijan) Sabail FK)
—	MF	ISR	Ameer Ryan (to Hapoel Nof HaGalil)
—	MF	ISR	Or Dasa (to Hapoel Umm al-Fahm)
—	MF	FRA	Noam Bonnet (Free agent)
—	MF	ISR	Asaf Hershko (Free agent)
—	MF	ISR	Ben Amsalem (Free agent)
—	MF	ISR	Neil Werthaim (to Maccabi Ata Bialik)
—	FW	ISR	Rave Assayag (to (Poland) Stal Mielec)
—	FW	ENG	Morgan Ferrier (to (Cyprus) Omonia Aradippou)
—	FW	USA	Nana Akosah-Bempah (to (Romania) Petrolul Ploiești)
—	FW	ISR	Netanel Hagani (to Hapoel Kfar Saba)

=== Hapoel Afula ===
In:

No.	Pos.	Nation	Player
—	GK	ISR	Amit Suiri (from Hapoel Haifa)
—	DF	COL	Gustavo Chará (from (Malta) Mosta)
—	DF	ISR	Niv Serdal (from Hapoel Umm al-Fahm)
—	DF	ISR	Alon Ginat (from Hapoel Ramat HaSharon)
—	DF	ISR	Itamar Guri (from Hapoel Ramat HaSharon)
—	DF	ISR	Ahmad Shaban (from Hapoel Acre)
—	MF	ISR	Shalev Daniel (from Bnei Yehuda)
—	MF	ISR	Eilon Elimelech (from Hapoel Rishon LeZion)
—	MF	ISR	Sa'ar Schwarz (on loan from Hapoel Hadera)
—	FW	ISR	Walid Darwish (from Maccabi Jaffa)
—	FW	COD	Kule Mbombo (from Hapoel Ramat HaSharon)
—	FW	ISR	Ahmed Khalaila (from Maccabi Umm al-Fahm)

Out:

No.	Pos.	Nation	Player
—	DF	ISR	Yonathan Laish (to Hapoel Jerusalem, his player card still belongs to Maccabi Haifa)
—	DF	ISR	Tamir Arbel (to Hapoel Haifa, previously loaned from Maccabi Haifa)
—	MF	NGA	Gavi Thompson (Free agent)
—	MF	ISR	Liav Preda (to F.C. Ashdod)
—	MF	FRA	Romain Habran (to Hapoel Acre)
—	MF	ISR	Liam Hermesh (loan return to Maccabi Haifa)
—	MF	ISR	Daniel Seneor (to Hapoel Herzliya)
—	MF	ISR	Evyatar Barak (to Maccabi Bnei Reineh)
—	FW	ISR	Ohad Barzilay (to Hapoel Kfar Shalem)
—	FW	FRA	Franck Rivollier (to (Bulgaria) Spartak Varna)
—	FW	ISR	Almog Shankor (to Hapoel Beit She'an)

=== Hapoel Kfar Saba ===
In:

No.	Pos.	Nation	Player
—	GK	ISR	Razi Abu Hamdan (from Hapoel Acre)
—	GK	ISR	Dan Drori (from Ironi Tiberias)
—	DF	ISR	Idan Ratta (from Bnei Yehuda)
—	DF	ISR	Jeffrey Nisembaum (from Hapoel Acre)
—	DF	ISR	Sapir Itah (from Bnei Yehuda)
—	MF	ISR	Roy Harel (on loan from Ironi Kiryat Shmona)
—	MF	BRA	Léo Índio (from Hapoel Ramat Gan)
—	MF	ISR	Sintayehu Sallalich (from Sektzia Ness Ziona)
—	MF	ISR	Yanai Ben Shushan (from Macacbi Petah Tikva)
—	MF	ISR	Niv Livnat (from Maccabi Netanya)
—	MF	ISR	Gal Levi (from Hapoel Umm al-Fahm)
—	MF	ISR	Liran Rigen (from Hapoel Be'er Sheva)
—	FW	BRA	Julio César (from Ironi Tiberias)
—	FW	ISR	Yoel Abuhatzira (from Ihud Bnei Shefa-'Amr)
—	FW	ISR	Netanel Hagani (from Hapoel Acre)

Out:

No.	Pos.	Nation	Player
—	GK	ISR	Netanel Daloya (to Maccabi Jaffa)
—	GK	ISR	Dor Hebron (to Hapoel Ra'anana, previously loaned from Maccabi Petah Tikva)
—	GK	ISR	Ariel Bardugo (to Hapoel Acre)
—	DF	ISR	Yehoshua Strimling (to (Mexico) Club América)
—	DF	ISR	Raz Baruchian (loan return to Beitar Jerusalem)
—	DF	ISR	Hagay Goldenberg (Free agent)
—	DF	ISR	Daniel Mor Yosef (to Hapoel Petah Tikva)
—	DF	SLE	Abdoulie Jarjue Kabia (to (Belarus) Dynamo Brest)
—	MF	ISR	Ari Cohen (loan return to Hapoel Tel Aviv)
—	MF	ISR	Tal Naim (to Maccabi Herzliya)
—	MF	ISR	Roi Maman (to F.C. Dimona, his player card still belongs to Hapoel Be'er Sheva)
—	MF	ISR	Awajo Asefa (Free agent)
—	FW	ISR	Ofek Reuven (to (Georgia (country)) FC Samtredia)
—	FW	ISR	Lior Inbrum (to Maccabi Herzliya)
—	FW	ISR	Roy Fadida (to Hapoel Ra'anana)
—	FW	ISR	Dudu Biton (Free agent)
—	FW	ISR	Daniel Elmaleh (to Beitar Nordia Jerusalem)
—	FW	ISR	Alon Buzorgi (to F.C. Dimona)
—	FW	NGA	Benjamin Kuku (to (Vietnam) Song Lam Nghe An)
—	FW	NGA	Daniel Chinomso (to Bnei Sakhnin)

=== Hapoel Kfar Shalem ===
In:

No.	Pos.	Nation	Player
—	GK	ISR	Roy Baranes (on loan from Hapoel Tel Aviv)
—	GK	ISR	Shahar Amsalem (from Maccabi Herzliya)
—	DF	ISR	Idan Weintraub (from Ironi Modi'in)
—	DF	SEN	Seydiba Mendes (Free transfer)
—	DF	ISR	Yuval Ben Ami (from Shimshon Tel Aviv)
—	DF	ISR	Manamto Asefa (from Hapoel Ashdod)
—	DF	ISR	Gal Mayo (from Maccabi Jaffa)
—	MF	ISR	Shahar Binestok (from Hapoel Ramat Gan)
—	MF	ISR	Dor Edri (from Shimshon Tel Aviv)
—	MF	ISR	Maor Biton (on loan from Bnei Yehuda)
—	MF	ISR	Reef Mesika (from Ironi Tiberias)
—	MF	ISR	Ben Reichert (from Hapoel Ramat HaSharon)
—	MF	ISR	Niv Ben Yosef (from Maccabi Kiryat Malakhi)
—	FW	ISR	Shahar Hirsh (from Bnei Yehuda)
—	FW	CPV	Clé (from (Cyprus) AEZ Zakakiou)
—	FW	ISR	Ohad Barzilay (from Hapoel Afula)
—	FW	ISR	Eyal Hen (from Bnei Yehuda)
—	FW	ISR	Issa Nasser (from Shimshon Kafr Qasim)

Out:

No.	Pos.	Nation	Player
—	GK	ISR	Gal Weiss (Free agent)
—	GK	ISR	Poraz Volkovich (to Hapoel Ashdod)
—	GK	ISR	Lidor Cohen (to Nordia Jerusalem)
—	DF	ISR	Ilay Krispi (to Hapoel Ra'anana, previously loaned from Hapoel Tel Aviv)
—	DF	ISR	Merabi Bergebadze (to F.C. Dimona)
—	DF	ISR	Amit Rozenboim (Free agent)
—	DF	ISR	Peleg Braun (Free agent)
—	DF	ISR	Yosef Tazbao (Free agent)
—	DF	ISR	Ido Mizrahi (to Hapoel Ramat Gan)
—	MF	ISR	Yoav Librus (to Sektzia Ness Ziona)
—	MF	ISR	Tomer Barzilay (to Shimshon Tel Aviv)
—	MF	ISR	Bantagiza Jamber (to Hapoel Herzliya)
—	MF	ISR	Moulat Gabra (to F.C. Tira)
—	MF	ISR	Dor Edri (to Ironi Modi'in)
—	MF	ISR	Tal Ayela (Free agent)
—	MF	ISR	Moshe Mula (Free agent)
—	MF	ISR	Ben Reichert (to Shimshon Tel Aviv)
—	FW	ISR	Omer Buaron (to Tzeirei Umm al-Fahm)
—	FW	ISR	Ido Exbard (to Maccabi Yavne)

=== Hapoel Nof HaGalil ===
In:

No.	Pos.	Nation	Player
—	DF	ISR	Ido Krebs (from Ironi Nesher)
—	MF	ISR	Ameer Ryan (from Hapoel Acre)
—	MF	ISR	Sami Kiwan (from F.C. Ashdod)
—	MF	SVN	Leon Sever (from (Slovenia) Dekani)
—	FW	ISR	Ido Elmshily (from Hapoel Tel Aviv)
—	FW	ISR	Guy Dahan (from F.C. Kafr Qasim)
—	FW	NGA	Peter Olawale (from Hapoel Ramat Gan)

Out:

No.	Pos.	Nation	Player
—	GK	ISR	Gil Barda (Free agent)
—	DF	ISR	Salah Hussein (to Ironi Kiryat Shmona)
—	DF	ISR	Ali Kayal (to Hapoel Umm al-Fahm)
—	DF	ISR	Tomer Lebanon (on loan to Tzeirei Umm al-Fahm)
—	DF	ISR	Ahmed Mansour (Free agent)
—	DF	ISR	Itamar Biton (Free agent)
—	MF	ISR	Bashar Mahajna (loan return to Hapoel Umm al-Fahm)
—	MF	ISR	Ryan Ashmuz (to F.C. Kafr Qasim)
—	MF	ISR	Ofir Mizrahi (to Hapoel Ra'anana)
—	MF	ISR	Micky Gruper (Free agent)
—	MF	ISR	Idan David (Free agent)
—	FW	ISR	Samir Farhud (to Hapoel Be'er Sheva)
—	FW	ISR	Jubaiyer Bushanek (to Bnei Sakhnin)
—	FW	ISR	Ben Mizan (Free agent)
—	FW	ISR	Fawzi Abbas (Free agent)

=== Hapoel Petah Tikva ===
In:

No.	Pos.	Nation	Player
—	GK	ISR	Lior Gliklich (on loan from Hapoel Tel Aviv)
—	DF	ISR	Itay Rotman (from Sektzia Ness Ziona)
—	DF	BEN	Charlemagne Azongnitode (from Oman Club)
—	DF	ISR	Noam Cohen (from F.C. Kafr Qasim)
—	MF	ISR	Tomer Altman (from Hapoel Jerusalem)
—	MF	ZAM	Kelvin Kapumbu (from (Zambia) ZESCO United)
—	MF	ISR	Roee David (from Maccabi Herzliya)
—	MF	ISR	Shay Sabah (loan return from Hapoel Bik'at HaYarden)
—	MF	ISR	Elian Rohana (on loan from Hapoel Tel Aviv)
—	MF	ISR	Ohad Hazut (from Hapoel Tel Aviv)
—	FW	ISR	Amir Berkovits (from Hapoel Hadera)
—	FW	ISR	Ben Azubel (from (Thailand) Trat)
—	FW	ISR	Noam Shahar (on loan from Hapoel Be'er Sheva)

Out:

No.	Pos.	Nation	Player
—	GK	ISR	Raz Karmi (to Beitar Jerusalem)
—	GK	ISR	Ran Haspia (on loan to Shimshon Tel Aviv)
—	DF	ECU	Jean Quiñónez (loan return to (Ecuador) Deportes Quindío)
—	DF	ISR	Roey Elimelech (loan return to Maccabi Haifa)
—	DF	AUT	Nico Antonitsch (Free agent)
—	DF	HAI	Djimy Alexis (to Hapoel Rishon LeZion)
—	DF	ISR	Daniel Mor Yosef (to Hapoel Kfar Saba)
—	MF	GHA	Gilbert Koomson (to (Iraq) Duhok)
—	MF	ISR	Avi Rikan (Free agent)
—	MF	ISR	Roy Nawi (loan return to Maccabi Tel Aviv)
—	MF	ISR	Hamza Shibli (loan return to Maccabi Haifa)
—	MF	ISR	Ido Davidov (to Hapoel Rishon LeZion)
—	MF	ISR	Idan Vered (to Maccabi Petah Tikva)
—	MF	ENG	Dennis Adeniran (to (Scotland) St Mirren)
—	MF	ISR	Tini Chacana (on loan to Maccabi Kiryat Malakhi)
—	MF	ISR	Samuel Broun (to Bnei Yehuda)
—	MF	ZAM	Kelvin Kapumbu (Free agent)
—	FW	ISR	Itay Shechter (Retired)
—	FW	ISR	Shoval Gozlan (to Bnei Yehuda)
—	FW	NGA	Fortune Bassey (loan return to (Hungary) Ferencváros)
—	FW	ISR	Raz Stain (to Hapoel Rishon LeZion)
—	FW	ISR	Ofek Osher (on loan to Hapoel Rishon LeZion)
—	FW	ISR	Oz Peretz (to Hapoel Umm al-Fahm)
—	FW	ISR	Bar Nawi (to Hapoel Acre)

=== Hapoel Ramat Gan ===
In:

No.	Pos.	Nation	Player
—	GK	ISR	Almog Malul (from Maccabi Jaffa)
—	GK	ISR	Itamar Israeli (from Ihud Bnei Shefa-'Amr)
—	DF	GHA	Mohammed Adams (from (Portugal) Covilhã)
—	DF	ISR	Matan Levi (on loan from Maccabi Netanya)
—	DF	ISR	Ido Mizrahi (from Hapoel Kfar Shalem)
—	DF	ISR	Ronny Laufer (on loan from Maccabi Haifa)
—	MF	ISR	Tom Aida (from Maccabi Ironi Ashdod)
—	MF	ISR	Amit Meir (from Bnei Yehuda)
—	FW	NGA	Daniel Chinomso (on loan from Bnei Sakhnin)
—	FW	ISR	Yakir Zilberman (from Maccabi Jaffa)

Out:

No.	Pos.	Nation	Player
—	GK	ISR	Ben Gordin (to Hapoel Be'er Sheva)
—	GK	ISR	Almog Malul (Free agent)
—	DF	ISR	Osher Abu (to Hapoel Ra'anana)
—	DF	ISR	Amit Bitton (Free agent)
—	DF	ISR	Daniel Mama (Free agent)
—	DF	ISR	Niran Rotshtein (Free agent)
—	MF	BRA	Léo Índio (to Hapoel Kfar Saba)
—	MF	ISR	Nir Hasson (Free agent)
—	MF	ISR	Harel Shasha (on loan to Maccabi Petah Tikva)
—	FW	ISR	Liran Elmaliah (Free agent)
—	MF	ISR	Shahar Binestok (to Hapoel Kfar Shalem)
—	FW	NGA	Peter Olawale (to Hapoel Nof HaGalil)

=== Hapoel Ramat HaSharon ===
In:

No.	Pos.	Nation	Player
—	GK	ISR	Matan Ambar (from Hapoel Rishon LeZion)
—	DF	ISR	Ben Hayun (from F.C. Tzeirei Tayibe)
—	DF	ISR	Adir Cordoba (on loan from Maccabi Tel Aviv)
—	DF	ISR	Najwan Khatib (on loan from Maccabi Tel Aviv)
—	DF	ISR	Kobi Mor (from Maccabi Jaffa)
—	DF	ISR	David Tiram (from Hapoel Hadera)
—	MF	ISR	Danny Rozenblit (from Maccabi Jaffa)
—	MF	ISR	Roy Zarzevski (on loan from Maccabi Tel Aviv)
—	MF	ISR	Jey Livne (from Hapoel Herzliya)
—	MF	GHA	Abass Samari Salifu (Unknown)
—	FW	ISR	Dovev Gabay (from Hapoel Umm al-Fahm)
—	FW	ISR	Ori Azo (on loan from Maccabi Tel Aviv)
—	FW	ISR	Amit Zur (on loan from Maccabi Tel Aviv)
—	FW	ISR	Orel Baye (on loan from Maccabi Tel Aviv)

Out:

No.	Pos.	Nation	Player
—	GK	ISR	Ido Sharon (loan return to Hapoel Tel Aviv)
—	DF	ISR	Shon Edri (to Ironi Kiryat Shmona, his player card still belongs to Maccabi Tel Aviv)
—	DF	ISR	David Tiram (to Hapoel Hadera)
—	DF	ISR	Alon Ginat (to Hapoel Afula)
—	DF	ISR	Itamar Guri (to Hapoel Afula)
—	DF	ISR	Guy Mishpati (to Maccabi Yavne)
—	DF	ISR	Liad Nebet (to Maccabi Yavne)
—	DF	ISR	Gal Matouk (loan return to Maccabi Petah Tikva)
—	DF	SDN	Duray Alpaki Ahmed (to Tzeirei Tira)
—	MF	ISR	Niv Livnat (to Hapoel Kfar Saba, previously loaned from Maccabi Netanya)
—	MF	CIV	Claude Kouakou (to Hapoel Acre)
—	MF	ISR	Ronen Gerdashov (to Shimshon Tel Aviv)
—	MF	ISR	Ben Reichert (to Hapoel Kfar Shalem)
—	MF	ISR	Shahaf Mor (Free agent)
—	MF	ISR	Dor Kochav (to Hapoel Umm al-Fahm)
—	MF	ISR	Yitzhak Peretz (Free agent)
—	MF	ISR	Danny Rozenblit (Free agent)
—	FW	ISR	Avraham Reda (to Hapoel Ra'anana)
—	FW	COD	Kule Mbombo (to Hapoel Afula)
—	FW	NGA	Peter Onyekachi (to Ironi Kiryat Shmona, previously loaned)
—	FW	ISR	Netanel Askias (to F.C. Dimona, his player card still belongs to Hapoel Be'er Sheva)
—	FW	ISR	Yehonatan Levy (Free agent)
—	FW	ISR	Roy Melika (Free agent)

=== Hapoel Rishon LeZion ===
In:

No.	Pos.	Nation	Player
—	GK	ISR	Arik Yanko (from Hapoel Umm al-Fahm)
—	DF	HAI	Djimy Alexis (from Hapoel Petah Tikva)
—	DF	ISR	Liad Levi (from Hapoel Umm al-Fahm)
—	DF	ISR	Yorai Maliach (from Hapoel Jerusalem)
—	MF	ISR	Itay Zada (on loan from Hapoel Jerusalem)
—	MF	ISR	Ido Davidov (from Hapoel Petah Tikva)
—	MF	FRA	Sacha Petshi (from Hapoel Umm al-Fahm)
—	MF	ISR	Sarel Cohen (on loan from Maccabi Haifa)
—	FW	ISR	Raz Stain (from Hapoel Petah Tikva)
—	FW	ISR	Ofek Osher (on loan from Hapoel Petah Tikva)
—	FW	ISR	Dor Jan (from Maccabi Herzliya)

Out:

No.	Pos.	Nation	Player
—	GK	ISR	Matan Ambar (to Hapoel Ramat HaSharon)
—	GK	ISR	Lior Gliklich (to Hapoel Petah Tikva, his player card still belongs to Hapoel Tel Aviv)
—	GK	ISR	Dvir Nir (Free agent)
—	DF	ISR	Amit Moseri (Free agent)
—	DF	CIV	Kouya Mabea (to (Romania) UTA Arad)
—	DF	ISR	Mor Edri (to Hapoel Herzliya)
—	DF	ISR	Tal Makhlouf (Free agent)
—	DF	ISR	Viki Kahlon (Free agent)
—	DF	ISR	Benny Tridovsky (Free agent)
—	DF	ISR	Eyas Masalha (Free agent)
—	MF	ISR	Daniel Tzadik (Free agent)
—	MF	ISR	Eden Dahan (Free agent)
—	MF	ISR	Eilon Elimelech (to Hapoel Afula)
—	MF	ISR	Gal Kolani (to Hapoel Umm al-Fahm)
—	MF	UZB	Vladimir Broun (Free agent)
—	MF	ISR	Ness Zamir (Free agent)
—	MF	ISR	Adi Giat (to Maccabi Ironi Ashdod)
—	MF	ISR	Shon Weiss (to Hapoel Acre)
—	MF	ISR	Vladimir Broun (to Hapoel Lod)
—	FW	UGA	Luwagga Kizito (Free agent)
—	FW	ISR	Yoav Tomer (Free agent)
—	FW	ISR	Orel Baye (Free agent)
—	FW	COD	Branham Kabala (Free agent)

=== Hapoel Tel Aviv ===
In:

No.	Pos.	Nation	Player
—	GK	ISR	Robi Levkovich (from Maccabi Petah Tikva)
—	GK	ISR	Ido Sharon (loan return from Hapoel Nir Ramat HaSharon)
—	DF	ISR	Roy Herman (Free transfer)
—	DF	CRO	Maks Čelić (from (Bosnia and Herzegovina) Borac Banja Luka)
—	DF	ISR	Ido Vaier (from Bnei Sakhnin)
—	DF	SRB	Goran Antonić (from (Serbia) TSC)
—	DF	ISR	Yazan Nassar (from Bnei Yehuda)
—	MF	ISR	Ohad Hazut (from Hapoel Acre)
—	MF	ISR	Roei Alkukin (loan return from Maccabi Herzliya)
—	MF	ISR	Ari Cohen (loan return from Hapoel Kfar Saba)
—	MF	SDN	Sammy Adam (on loan to Maccabi Jaffa)
—	MF	ISR	Liran Rotman (from Maccabi Netanya)
—	MF	ISR	Goni Naor (on loan from Maccabi Haifa)
—	FW	ISR	Roy Korine (on loan from Maccabi Netanya)
—	FW	SRB	Milan Makarić (from (Denmark) AaB)
—	FW	ISR	Ben Sahar (from Maccabi Petah Tikva)
—	FW	ISR	Ahmed Abed (from Ironi Tiberias)

Out:

No.	Pos.	Nation	Player
—	GK	LTU	Emilijus Zubas (Free agent)
—	GK	ISR	Roy Baranes (on loan to Hapoel Kfar Shalem)
—	DF	ISR	Raz Meir (to Maccabi Netanya)
—	DF	ISR	Or Blorian (loan return to Hapoel Be'er Sheva)
—	DF	CGO	Bryan Passi (to (Portugal) Mafra)
—	DF	ISR	Ilay Krispi (to Hapoel Ra'anana)
—	DF	CRO	Maks Čelić (Free agent)
—	MF	ISR	Ihab Ghanayem (to Maccabi Bnei Reineh)
—	MF	ISR	Omri Altman (on loan to (Greece) Volos)
—	MF	ISR	Elian Rohana (on loan to Hapoel Petah Tikva)
—	MF	ISR	Ohad Hazut (to Hapoel Petah Tikva)
—	FW	SVN	Alen Ožbolt (to (Greece) Levadiakos)
—	FW	GAM	Bubacarr Tambedou (to (Georgia (country)) Dinamo Batumi)
—	FW	ISR	Hisham Layous (to Maccabi Tel Aviv)
—	FW	ISR	Ido Elmshily (to Hapoel Nof HaGalil, previously loaned to F.C. Kafr Qasim)
—	FW	ISR	Liad Ramot (on loan to Maccabi Jaffa)
—	FW	CGO	Mavis Tchibota (to (Russia) Akron Tolyatti)
—	FW	ISR	Omer Senior (to Hapoel Hadera)

=== Hapoel Umm al-Fahm ===
In:

No.	Pos.	Nation	Player
—	GK	PLE	Mahdi Zoabi (from Hapoel Kaukab)
—	DF	ISR	Sahar Dabach (from Maccabi Herzliya)
—	DF	ISR	Ali Kayal (from Hapoel Nof HaGalil)
—	DF	NGA	Alex Emeka (from (Nigeria) Niger Tornadoes)
—	DF	RUS	Nikita Khodorchenko (from (Russia) Zvezda St. Petersburg)
—	MF	ISR	Marwan Kabha (from Maccabi Jaffa)
—	MF	ISR	Amir Agayev (from Sektzia Ness Ziona)
—	MF	ISR	Or Dasa (from Hapoel Acre)
—	MF	ISR	Dor Kochav (from Hapoel Ramat HaSharon)
—	FW	NGA	Chinemerem Godwin (on loan from Bnei Sakhnin)
—	FW	ISR	Guy Ben Lulu (from Ironi Kiryat Shmona)
—	FW	ISR	Danni Amer (from Maccabi Jaffa)

Out:

No.	Pos.	Nation	Player
—	GK	ISR	Arik Yanko (to Hapoel Rishon LeZion)
—	GK	ISR	Yoav Arikha (to Maccabi Petah Tikva)
—	DF	ISR	Niv Serdal (to Hapoel Afula)
—	DF	ISR	Liad Levi (to Hapoel Rishon LeZion)
—	DF	ISR	Omri Luzon (to Bnei Yehuda)
—	DF	BRA	Marcus Diniz (Free agent)
—	DF	ISR	Tal Kachila (to F.C. Dimona)
—	DF	ISR	Adar Azruel (Free agent)
—	MF	ISR	Shay Golan (to F.C. Kafr Qasim)
—	MF	ISR	Gal Levi (to Hapoel Kfar Saba)
—	MF	FRA	Sacha Petshi (to Hapoel Rishon LeZion)
—	MF	ISR	Mohammed Abu Shaker (on loan to Tzeirei Umm al-Fahm)
—	MF	ISR	Tambi Sagas (to Maccabi Herzliya)
—	FW	ISR	Dovev Gabay (to Hapoel Ramat HaSharon)
—	FW	ISR	Abed Elaroof Jabarin (to Hapoel Kfar Saba)
—	FW	ISR	Ahmad Darawshe (to Maccabi Herzliya)
—	FW	CRC	Rachid Chirino (to (Costa Rica) Deportivo Saprissa, previously loaned from Maccabi Netanya)
—	FW	PLE	Ali El-Khatib (to Tzeirei Umm al-Fahm)
—	FW	ISR	Oz Peretz (to Hapoel Petah Tikva)
—	FW	ISR	Gal Katabi (Free agent)

=== Hapoel Ra'anana ===
In:

No.	Pos.	Nation	Player
—	GK	ISR	Dor Hebron (from Maccabi Petah Tikva)
—	GK	SWE	Benjamin Machini (from (Sweden) Motala)
—	DF	ISR	Aviv Lin (on loan from Hapoel Hadera)
—	DF	ISR	Ilay Krispi (from Hapoel Tel Aviv)
—	DF	ISR	Osher Abu (from Hapoel Ramat Gan)
—	DF	HON	Wesly Decas (from (Honduras) Motagua)
—	MF	ISR	Ofir Mizrahi (from Hapoel Nof HaGalil)
—	FW	PAN	Newton Williams (from (Guatemala) Antigua)
—	MF	ISR	Shlomi Azulay (from F.C. Ashdod)
—	FW	ISR	Avraham Reda (from Hapoel Ramat HaSharon)
—	FW	ISR	Roy Fadida (from Hapoel Kfar Saba)
—	FW	ISR	Hayford Adjei (from Bnei Yehuda)

Out:

No.	Pos.	Nation	Player
—	GK	ISR	Amit Sarusi (to F.C. Kiryat Yam)
—	DF	ISR	Maor Benyair (Hapoel Marmorek)
—	DF	ISR	Solomon Yosef (Free agent)
—	DF	ISR	Liel Deri (loan return to Beitar Jerusalem)
—	DF	ISR	Dan Sirkis (to Hapoel Acre)
—	DF	ISR	Yair Kanikowsky (to Shimshon Tel Aviv)
—	MF	ISR	Ido Schwarz (Free agent)
—	MF	ISR	Ori Eshel (Free agent)
—	MF	ISR	Ron Nulman (Free agent)
—	MF	ISR	Ben El Moshe (Free agent)
—	MF	ISR	Roee Ben David (Free agent)
—	MF	ISR	Eden Ben-Menashe (to Nordia Jerusalem)
—	MF	ISR	Yonatan Farber (to Hapoel Haifa)
—	MF	ISR	Rotem Baruch (to Shimshon Tel Aviv)
—	FW	ISR	Ron Arie (to (United States) FIU Panthers)
—	FW	ISR	Ahmed Rabia (to F.C. Tira)
—	FW	ISR	Bar Shemesh (Free agent)
—	FW	ISR	Roy Fadida (to F.C. Jerusalem)

=== Maccabi Herzliya ===
In:

No.	Pos.	Nation	Player
—	GK	ISR	Yossi Ginzburg (from Sektzia Ness Ziona)
—	DF	ISR	Omer Korsia (from Beitar Jerusalem)
—	DF	ISR	Netanel Amoyal (from Sektzia Ness Ziona)
—	DF	ISR	Mustaffa Gadban (from Maccabi Akhi Nazareth)
—	DF	BEN	Bienvenu Vigninou (from (Benin) Loto-Popo)
—	DF	ISR	Shaked Hakmon (on loan from F.C. Ashdod)
—	MF	ISR	Tal Naim (from Hapoel Kfar Saba)
—	MF	ISR	Yan Benbenisti (from Maccabi Ironi Ashdod)
—	MF	ISR	Tambi Sagas (from Hapoel Umm al-Fahm)
—	FW	ISR	Lior Inbrum (from Hapoel Kfar Saba)
—	FW	ISR	Mor Fadida (from Sektzia Ness Ziona)
—	FW	ISR	Sahar Brami (from F.C. Holon Yermiyahu)
—	FW	ISR	Harel Ben Avi (from Maccabi Ironi Ashdod)
—	FW	ISR	Ahmad Darawshe (from Hapoel Umm al-Fahm)
—	FW	ISR	Ariel Lugasi (on loan from Maccabi Petah Tikva)
—	FW	ISR	Roey Ben Shimon (from Bnei Yehuda)

Out:

No.	Pos.	Nation	Player
—	GK	ISR	Shahar Amsalem (to Hapoel Kfar Shalem)
—	GK	ISR	Omer Kabilio (Free agent)
—	GK	ISR	Ben Musayof (to Hapoel Lod)
—	DF	CIV	Abdoul Coulibaly (to Hapoel Nof HaGalil, his player card still belongs to Hapoel Be'er Sheva)
—	DF	ISR	Sahar Dabach (to Hapoel Umm al-Fahm)
—	DF	ISR	Dor Alberman (to Shimshon Tel Aviv)
—	DF	ISR	Amir Rustum (Free agent)
—	DF	ISR	Ilay Ivgi (on loan to Maccabi Ironi Ashdod)
—	MF	ISR	Roee David (to Hapoel Petah Tikva)
—	MF	ISR	Roei Alkukin (loan return to Hapoel Tel Aviv)
—	MF	ISR	Eylon Yerushalmi (to Maccabi Jaffa)
—	MF	GHA	Gershon Koffie (Free agent)
—	MF	CIV	Sékou Doumbia (Free agent)
—	FW	ISR	Dor Jan (to Hapoel Rishon LeZion)
—	FW	NGA	Steven Alfred (to (Belarus) Dinamo Minsk)
—	FW	ISR	Idan Vaknin (to Shimshon Tel Aviv)

=== Maccabi Jaffa ===
In:

No.	Pos.	Nation	Player
—	GK	ISR	Netanel Daloya (from Hapoel Kfar Saba)
—	GK	ISR	Adi Nesse (on loan from Maccabi Tel Aviv)
—	DF	CRO	Arian Mrsulja (from (Romania) Viitorul Târgu Jiu)
—	DF	NGA	Adeleke Adekunle (from (Nigeria) Sporting Lagos)
—	DF	ISR	Ari Merenstein (from Hapoel Be'er Sheva)
—	MF	ISR	Izzy Hansen (from F.C. Kiryat Yam)
—	MF	SDN	Sammy Adam (on loan to Hapoel Tel Aviv)
—	MF	ISR	Yasmao Cabeda (from Hapoel Haifa)
—	MF	ISR	Eylon Yerushalmi (from Maccabi Herzliya)
—	FW	CRC	Randy Ramírez (on loan from (Costa Rica) Fútbol Consultants)
—	FW	ISR	Michael Maman (from Bnei Yehuda)
—	FW	ISR	Liad Ramot (on loan from Hapoel Tel Aviv)

Out:

No.	Pos.	Nation	Player
—	GK	ISR	Almog Malul (to Hapoel Ramat Gan)
—	GK	ISR	Adi Nesse (to Hapoel Herzliya)
—	GK	ISR	Or Moseri (to Hapoel Ramat Gan)
—	DF	ISR	Amit Cohen (to Bnei Yehuda)
—	DF	BFA	Abdoul Junior Kabre (Free agent)
—	DF	ISR	Kobi Mor (to Hapoel Ramat HaSharon)
—	DF	ISR	Gal Mayo (to Hapoel Kfar Shalem)
—	DF	ISR	Elad Ashram (on loan to Hapoel Ashdod)
—	MF	ISR	Danny Rozenblit (to Hapoel Ramat HaSharon)
—	MF	ISR	Marwan Kabha (to Hapoel Umm al-Fahm)
—	MF	NGA	John Ogu (Free agent)
—	FW	ISR	Gil Itzhak (to Bnei Yehuda)
—	FW	ISR	Walid Darwish (to Hapoel Afula)
—	FW	ISR	Fadeel Zbedat (to Maccabi Bnei Reineh)
—	FW	ISR	Danni Amer (to Hapoel Umm al-Fahm)
—	FW	ISR	Yakir Zilberman (to Hapoel Ramat Gan)
