= List of Israeli football transfers summer 2025 =

This is a list of Israeli football transfers for the 2025 summer transfer window.

== Ligat Ha'Al ==
=== Beitar Jerusalem ===
In:

No.	Pos.	Nation	Player
—	DF	(Israel) ISR	Yarden Cohen (from Maccabi Petah Tikva)
—	DF	(Senegal) SEN	Arial Mendy (from (France) Grenoble)
—	MF	(Israel) ISR	Ziv Ben Shimol (from Maccabi Haifa, previously loaned to Bnei Yehuda)
—	MF	(Cape Verde) CPV	Aílson Tavares (from (Portugal) Felgueiras)
—	MF	(Israel) ISR	Aviel Zargari (from Maccabi Haifa)
—	FW	(Nigeria) NGA	Johnbosco Kalu (from (Sweden) IFK Värnamo)
—	FW	(Israel) ISR	Dor Hugi (from Hapoel Haifa)

Out:

No.	Pos.	Nation	Player
—	GK	(Israel) ISR	Raz Carmi (to F.C. Ashdod)
—	DF	(Madagascar) MAD	Jean Marcelin (to (Austria) Rapid Wien)

=== Bnei Sakhnin ===
In:

No.	Pos.	Nation	Player
—	DF	(Israel) ISR	Max Grechkin (from Hapoel Jerusalem)
—	MF	(Israel) ISR	Mustapha Sheikh Yousef (from Hapoel Kfar Saba)
—	MF	(Israel) ISR	Eden Shamir (from Maccabi Petah Tikva)
—	MF	(Republic of the Congo) CGO	Glid Otanga (from (Qatar) Al Kharaitiyat)
—	FW	(Armenia) ARM	Artur Miranyan (from (Romania) Universitatea Cluj)

Out:

No.	Pos.	Nation	Player
—	DF	(Israel) ISR	Ovadia Darwish (to Ironi Kiryat Shmona)
—	DF	(Israel) ISR	Naftali Belay (to Hapoel Haifa, his player card still belongs to Maccabi Netanya)
—	DF	(Ukraine) UKR	Daniel Joulani (to Maccabi Haifa, previously loaned from Maccabi Petah Tikva)
—	MF	(Israel) ISR	Ilay Elmkies (to Ironi Tiberias)
—	MF	(Israel) ISR	Beram Kayal (Retired)
—	FW	(Guadeloupe) GLP	Lenny Nangis (to F.C. Ashdod)

=== F.C. Ashdod ===
In:

No.	Pos.	Nation	Player
—	GK	(Israel) ISR	Raz Carmi (from Beitar Jerusalem)
—	DF	(Ivory Coast) CIV	Ibrahim Diakité (from (Ivory Coast) ASEC Mimosas)
—	DF	(Israel) ISR	Asaf Arania (from (Germany) SV Darmstadt 98)
—	MF	(Israel) ISR	Roei Gordana (from Hapoel Be'er Sheva)
—	MF	(Israel) ISR	Or Dasa (from Hapoel Umm al-Fahm)
—	FW	(Israel) ISR	Ben Hadadi (from Hapoel Ramat HaSharon)

Out:

No.	Pos.	Nation	Player
—	DF	(Israel) ISR	Roy Levi (to Hapoel Be'er Sheva)
—	DF	(Israel) ISR	Shahar Rosen (loan return to Maccabi Tel Aviv)
—	MF	(Israel) ISR	Mohammed Kna'an (to Hapoel Be'er Sheva)
—	MF	(Cameroon) CMR	Martin Ndzie (to (Austria) SK Rapid Wien)
—	FW	(Israel) ISR	Shlomi Azulay (to Hapoel Kfar Shalem)
—	FW	(Guadeloupe) GLP	Lenny Nangis (from Bnei Sakhnin)

=== Hapoel Be'er Sheva ===
In:

No.	Pos.	Nation	Player
—	DF	(Israel) ISR	Roy Levi (from F.C. Ashdod)
—	MF	(Israel) ISR	Mohammed Kna'an (from F.C. Ashdod)
—	MF	(Zambia) ZAM	Joseph Banda (from (Switzerland) Zürich)
—	FW	(Serbia) SRB	Igor Zlatanović (from Maccabi Netanya)

Out:

No.	Pos.	Nation	Player
—	MF	(Israel) ISR	Roei Gordana (to F.C. Ashdod)
—	FW	(Romania) ROU	Antonio Sefer (to Maccabi Bnei Reineh)

=== Hapoel Haifa ===
In:

No.	Pos.	Nation	Player
—	DF	(Portugal) POR	Robinho (from (Portugal) Penafiel)
—	DF	(Israel) ISR	Naftali Belay (from Bnei Sakhnin, his player card still belongs to Maccabi Netanya)
—	DF	(Guinea-Bissau) GNB	Saná Gomes (from (Cyprus) Omonia Aradippou)
—	DF	(Brazil) BRA	Bruno Ramirez (from (Brazil) Amazonas)
—	MF	(Colombia) COL	Larry Angulo (from (Costa Rica) Alajuelense)
—	MF	(Mali) MLI	Salam Jiddou (from (Algeria) NC Magra)
—	FW	(Israel) ISR	Roei Zikri (from Ironi Kiryat Shmona)

Out:

No.	Pos.	Nation	Player
—	GK	(Israel) ISR	Yoav Gerafi (to Maccabi Tel Aviv)
—	DF	(Republic of the Congo) CGO	Fernand Mayembo (to Hapoel Tel Aviv)
—	DF	(Israel) ISR	Noam Ben Harush (to Maccabi Tel Aviv)
—	DF	(Israel) ISR	Orel Dgani (to Hapoel Petah Tikva)
—	MF	(Israel) ISR	Itamar Noy (to Maccabi Tel Aviv)
—	MF	(Israel) ISR	Bar Lin (to (Ukraine) Kryvbas Kryvyi Rih, his player card still belongs to Maccabi Tel Aviv)
—	FW	(Israel) ISR	Dor Hugi (to Beitar Jerusalem)

=== Hapoel Jerusalem ===
In:

No.	Pos.	Nation	Player
—	DF	(Israel) ISR	Tamir Haimovich (from Hapoel Kfar Shalem)
—	DF	(Kosovo) KOS	David Domgjoni (from (Albania) Partizani Tirana)
—	DF	(Nigeria) NGA	Waliu Ojetoye (from (Nigeria) Ikorodu City)
—	MF	(Ivory Coast) CIV	Daniel Kodogo (from (Ivory Coast) JC d'Abidjan)
—	MF	(Israel) ISR	Ido Oli (on loan from Maccabi Tel Aviv)
—	FW	(Israel) ISR	Orel Baye (on loan from Maccabi Tel Aviv)
—	FW	(Guinea-Bissau) GNB	Jardel (from Ironi Kiryat Shmona)
—	FW	(Israel) ISR	Shlomi Azulay (from F.C. Ashdod)

Out:

No.	Pos.	Nation	Player
—	DF	(Israel) ISR	Max Grechkin (to Bnei Sakhnin)
—	DF	(Israel) ISR	Amit Glazer (to Hapoel Petah Tikva his player card still belongs to Maccabi Tel Aviv)
—	MF	(Israel) ISR	Ido Oli (to Hapoel Jerusalem, his player card still belongs to Maccabi Tel Aviv)

=== Hapoel Petah Tikva ===
In:

No.	Pos.	Nation	Player
—	GK	(Israel) ISR	Guy Herman (from Hapoel Hadera)
—	GK	(Israel) ISR	Shahar Amsalem (from Hapoel Kfar Shalem)
—	DF	(Israel) ISR	Noam Cohen (from Ironi Kiryat Shmona)
—	DF	(Israel) ISR	Orel Dgani (from Hapoel Haifa)
—	DF	(Israel) ISR	Shahar Rosen (on loan from Maccabi Tel Aviv)
—	DF	(Israel) ISR	Amit Glazer (on loan from Maccabi Tel Aviv)
—	MF	(Israel) ISR	Nadav Nidam (on loan from Maccabi Tel Aviv)
—	MF	(Ivory Coast) CIV	Boni Amian (from (Russia) Khimki)
—	FW	(Israel) ISR	Yehuda Balay (on loan from Maccabi Tel Aviv)
—	FW	(Israel) ISR	Shavit Mazal (from Hapoel Ramat Gan)
—	FW	(Cape Verde) CPV	Clé (from Hapoel Kfar Shalem)
—	FW	(Nigeria) NGA	James Adeniyi (from Hapoel Hadera)
—	FW	(Israel) ISR	Noam Gissin (from Bnei Yehuda)

Out:

No.	Pos.	Nation	Player
—	GK	(Israel) ISR	Tomer Litvinov (to Hapoel Acre)

=== Hapoel Tel Aviv ===
In:

No.	Pos.	Nation	Player
—	GK	(Israel) ISR	Assaf Tzur (from Ironi Kiryat Shmona)
—	DF	(Republic of the Congo) CGO	Fernand Mayembo (from Hapoel Haifa)
—	DF	(Israel) ISR	Doron Leidner (on loan from (Greece) Olympiacos)
—	MF	(Brazil) BRA	Lucas Falcão (from (Brazil) Athletico Paranaense)
—	MF	(Bulgaria) BUL	Andrian Kraev (from (Portugal) Casa Pia)
—	FW	(Israel) ISR	Anas Mahamid (from Maccabi Petah Tikva)
—	FW	(Israel) ISR	Mor Buskila (from Hapoel Ramat Gan)
—	FW	(Israel) ISR	Daniel Dappa (from Maccabi Netanya)
—	FW	(Israel) ISR	Idan Baranes (to Hapoel Tel Aviv)

Out:

No.	Pos.	Nation	Player
—	DF	(Israel) ISR	Ido Vaier (to Ironi Kiryat Shmona)
—	DF	(Israel) ISR	Ofer Gelbard (on loan to Maccabi Jaffa)
—	MF	(Israel) ISR	Ofek Mishan (on loan to Maccabi Herzliya)
—	FW	(Israel) ISR	Itamar Shviro (to Ironi Tiberias)

=== Ironi Kiryat Shmona ===
In:

No.	Pos.	Nation	Player
—	GK	(Brazil) BRA	Daniel Tenenbaum (from Ironi Tiberias)
—	DF	(Serbia) SRB	Nemanja Ljubisavljević (from Maccabi Bnei Reineh)
—	DF	(Israel) ISR	Ovadia Darwish (from Bnei Sakhnin)
—	DF	(Israel) ISR	Ido Vaier (from Hapoel Tel Aviv)
—	MF	(Israel) ISR	Aviv Avraham (from (Greece) Levadiakos)
—	MF	(Israel) ISR	Lidor Cohen (to F.C. Kiryat Yam)
—	FW	(Belgium) BEL	Anthony Limbombe (from (Belgium) Beveren)

Out:

No.	Pos.	Nation	Player
—	GK	(Israel) ISR	Assaf Tzur (to Hapoel Tel Aviv)
—	DF	(Israel) ISR	Noam Cohen (to Hapoel Petah Tikva)
—	DF	(Israel) ISR	Dudu Twito (to Hapoel Ramat Gan)
—	DF	(Israel) ISR	Ayid Habshi (to Maccabi Bnei Reineh)
—	MF	(Israel) ISR	Nadav Nidam (to Hapoel Petah Tikva, his player card still belongs to Maccabi Tel Aviv)
—	FW	(Israel) ISR	Roei Zikri (to Hapoel Haifa)
—	FW	(Guinea-Bissau) GNB	Jardel (to Ironi Kiryat Shmona)

=== Ironi Tiberias ===
In:

No.	Pos.	Nation	Player
—	GK	(Portugal) POR	Rogério (from (Azerbaijan) Kapaz)
—	DF	(Guinea-Bissau) GNB	Sambinha (from Maccabi Bnei Reineh)
—	DF	(Israel) ISR	Ron Unger (from Maccabi Bnei Reineh)
—	DF	(Ukraine) UKR	Daniel Joulani (on loan from Maccabi Haifa)
—	DF	(Israel) ISR	Nehoray Chen (from Bnei Yehuda)
—	MF	(Israel) ISR	Ilay Elmkies (from Bnei Sakhnin)
—	MF	(Nigeria) NGA	Muhammed Usman (from Maccabi Bnei Reineh)
—	MF	(Israel) ISR	Guy Hadida (from Maccabi Bnei Reineh)
—	MF	(Israel) ISR	Yarin Swisa (from F.C. Dimona)
—	FW	(Israel) ISR	Itamar Shviro (from Hapoel Tel Aviv)

Out:

No.	Pos.	Nation	Player
—	GK	(Brazil) BRA	Daniel Tenenbaum (to Ironi Kiryat Shmona)
—	DF	(Israel) ISR	Ben Vehava (to Maccabi Petah Tikva)
—	MF	(Israel) ISR	Firas Abu Akel (to Maccabi Bnei Reineh)
—	MF	(Israel) ISR	Michael Ohana (to Maccabi Haifa)
—	MF	(Israel) ISR	Bassam Zarora (loan return to Maccabi Netanya)
—	MF	(Israel) ISR	Matanel Tadesa (to Hapoel Nof HaGalil)

=== Maccabi Bnei Reineh ===
In:

No.	Pos.	Nation	Player
—	GK	(Israel) ISR	Lior Gliklich (from Hapoel Petah Tikva)
—	DF	(Israel) ISR	Ayid Habshi (from Ironi Kiryat Shmona)
—	DF	(Nigeria) NGA	Junior Pius (from (Portugal) Chaves)
—	DF	(Israel) ISR	Nevo Shedo (from Hapoel Nof HaGalil)
—	DF	(Serbia) SRB	Miladin Stevanović (from (Serbia) Čukarički)
—	MF	(Israel) ISR	Firas Abu Akel (from Ironi Tiberias)
—	MF	(Serbia) SRB	Aleksa Pejić (from (Serbia) TSC)
—	MF	(Israel) ISR	Idan Goren (from Hapoel Afula)
—	MF	(Zambia) ZAM	Emmanuel Banda (from (Saudi Arabia) Al-Tai)
—	FW	(Romania) ROU	Antonio Sefer (from Hapoel Be'er Sheva)
—	FW	(Israel) ISR	Asil Kna'ani (from Hapoel Nof HaGalil)

Out:

No.	Pos.	Nation	Player
—	DF	(Serbia) SRB	Nemanja Ljubisavljević (to Ironi Kiryat Shmona)
—	DF	(Israel) ISR	Ron Unger (to Ironi Tiberias)
—	DF	(Guinea-Bissau) GNB	Sambinha (to Ironi Tiberias)
—	MF	(Nigeria) NGA	Usman Muhammed (to Ironi Tiberias)
—	MF	(Israel) ISR	Guy Hadida (to Ironi Tiberias)
—	MF	(Republic of the Congo) CGO	Leroy Mondzenga (to Hapoel Rishon LeZion)

=== Maccabi Haifa ===
In:

No.	Pos.	Nation	Player
—	GK	(Ukraine) UKR	Heorhiy Yermakov (loan return from (Ukraine) Oleksandriya)
—	DF	(France) FRA	Pierre Cornud (from (France) AS Saint-Étienne)
—	DF	(Belgium) BEL	Jelle Bataille (from (Belgium) Royal Antwerp)
—	DF	(Ukraine) UKR	Daniel Joulani (from Maccabi Petah Tikva, previously loaned to Bnei Sakhnin)
—	MF	(Israel) ISR	Michael Ohana (from Ironi Tiberias)
—	FW	(Curaçao) CUW	Kenji Gorré (from (Qatar) Umm Salal)
—	FW	(Serbia) SRB	Đorđe Jovanović (on loan from (Switzerland) FC Basel)
—	FW	(Jamaica) JAM	Trivante Stewart (from (Serbia) Radnički Niš)

Out:

No.	Pos.	Nation	Player
—	GK	(Argentina) ARG	Tomás Sultani (to (Argentina) Tigre)
—	DF	(Ukraine) UKR	Daniel Joulani (on loan to Ironi Tiberias)
—	MF	(Israel) ISR	Ziv Ben Shimol (to Beitar Jerusalem, previously loaned to Bnei Yehuda)
—	MF	(Israel) ISR	Aviel Zargari (to Beitar Jerusalem)
—	MF	(Israel) ISR	Dia Saba (to (Turkey) Amedspor)
—	FW	(Israel) ISR	Yahli Malka (to Hapoel Acre)
—	FW	(Israel) ISR	Dean David (to (Japan) Yokohama F. Marinos)

=== Maccabi Netanya ===
In:

No.	Pos.	Nation	Player
—	MF	(Israel) ISR	Omri Shamir (from Hapoel Ramat Gan)
—	MF	(Israel) ISR	Bassam Zarora (loan return from Ironi Tiberias)
—	MF	(Brazil) BRA	Andrey (from (Brazil) Athletic)
—	FW	(United States) USA	Wilson Harris (from Maccabi Petah Tikva)
—	FW	(Brazil) BRA	Luccas Paraizo (from (Brazil) Guarani)

Out:

No.	Pos.	Nation	Player
—	DF	(Israel) ISR	Nikita Stoinov (to (Romania) Dinamo București)
—	MF	(Israel) ISR	Bar Cohen (to (Azerbaijan) Araz-Naxçıvan)
—	FW	(Venezuela) VEN	Freddy Vargas (on loan to (Azerbaijan) Neftçi)
—	FW	(Serbia) SRB	Igor Zlatanović (to Hapoel Be'er Sheva)
—	FW	(Israel) ISR	Daniel Dappa (to Hapoel Tel Aviv)

=== Maccabi Tel Aviv ===
In:

No.	Pos.	Nation	Player
—	GK	(Israel) ISR	Yoav Gerafi (from Hapoel Haifa)
—	DF	(Israel) ISR	Noam Ben Harush (from Hapoel Haifa)
—	DF	(Israel) ISR	Denny Gropper (from (Bulgaria) Ludogorets Razgrad)
—	DF	(Brazil) BRA	Heitor (from (Hungary) Győr)
—	DF	(Guinea) GUI	Mohamed Ali Camara (from (Switzerland) Young Boys)
—	MF	(Israel) ISR	Itamar Noy (from Hapoel Haifa)
—	MF	(Poland) POL	Ben Lederman (from (Poland) Raków Częstochowa)
—	FW	(Moldova) MDA	Ion Nicolaescu (from (Netherlands) Heerenveen)

Out:

No.	Pos.	Nation	Player
—	DF	(Israel) ISR	Stav Lemkin (to (Netherlands) FC Twente, previously loaned from (Ukraine) Shakhtar Donetsk)
—	DF	(Israel) ISR	Idan Nachmias (to (Bulgaria) Ludogorets Razgrad)
—	MF	(Israel) ISR	Gabi Kanichowsky (to (Hungary) Ferencváros)
—	FW	(Ghana) GHA	Henry Addo (on loan to (Serbia) OFK Beograd)

== Ligat Leumit ==
=== Bnei Yehuda ===
In:

No.	Pos.	Nation	Player
—	GK	(Israel) ISR	Ohad Levita (from Hapoel Hadera)
—	DF	(Israel) ISR	Raz Nachmias (from Hapoel Ramat Gan)
—	DF	(Israel) ISR	Matan Levi (from Hapoel Ramat Gan)
—	DF	(Israel) ISR	Tamir Berman (from (Italy) Monopoli 1966)
—	MF	(Israel) ISR	Sagi Dror (from Hapoel Ramat Gan)
—	FW	(Haiti) HAI	Frantz Pierrot (from (Bosnia and Herzegovina) Velež Mostar)
—	FW	(Portugal) POR	António Xavier (from (Portugal) Tondela)

Out:

No.	Pos.	Nation	Player
—	GK	(Israel) ISR	Roy Sason (to Hapoel Kfar Shalem, his player card still belongs to Beitar Jerusalem)
—	DF	(Israel) ISR	Nehoray Kariv (on loan to Hapoel Kfar Shalem)
—	DF	(Israel) ISR	Nehoray Chen (to Ironi Tiberias)
—	MF	(Israel) ISR	Ziv Ben Shimol (to Beitar Jerusalem, previously loaned from Maccabi Haifa)
—	MF	(Israel) ISR	Guy Sivilia (to Hapoel Kfar Shalem)
—	MF	(Israel) ISR	Yaniv Brik (to Hapoel Afula)
—	FW	(Israel) ISR	Gil Itzhak (to Maccabi Jaffa)
—	FW	(Israel) ISR	Noam Gissin (to Hapoel Petah Tikva)

=== F.C. Kfar Qasim ===
In:

No.	Pos.	Nation	Player
—	MF	(Israel) ISR	Sagas Tambi (from Maccabi Herzliya)

Out:

No.	Pos.	Nation	Player
—	FW	(Israel) ISR	Mohammed Khatib (to Maccabi Petah Tikva)
—	FW	(Israel) ISR	Asil Kna'ani (to Maccabi Bnei Reineh)

=== F.C. Kiryat Yam ===
In:

No.	Pos.	Nation	Player
—	DF	(Israel) ISR	Ronny Laufer (from Hapoel Ramat Gan)
—	DF	(Israel) ISR	Mor Naaman (from Hapoel Afula)
—	MF	(Israel) ISR	Lidor Cohen (from Ironi Kiryat Shmona)
—	FW	(Brazil) BRA	Felipe Clemente (from (Brazil) Confiança)

Out:

No.	Pos.	Nation	Player
—	DF	(Israel) ISR	Amit Bar (to Hapoel Afula)

=== Hapoel Acre ===
In:

No.	Pos.	Nation	Player
—	GK	(Israel) ISR	Tomer Litvinov (from Maccabi Petah Tikva)
—	DF	(Israel) ISR	Merabi Bergebadze (from F.C. Dimona)
—	DF	(Austria) AUT	Stipe Vučur (from (Bosnia and Herzegovina) Široki Brijeg)
—	MF	(Israel) ISR	Rauf Jabarin (from Hapoel Kfar Saba)
—	MF	(Israel) ISR	Reef Mesika (from Hapoel Kfar Shalem)
—	FW	(Israel) ISR	Osama Khalaila (from (Ukraine) LNZ Cherkasy)
—	FW	(Israel) ISR	Yahli Malka (from Maccabi Haifa)

Out:

No.	Pos.	Nation	Player
—	FW	(Israel) ISR	Idan Baranes (to Hapoel Tel Aviv)

=== Hapoel Afula ===
In:

No.	Pos.	Nation	Player
—	DF	(Israel) ISR	Amit Bar (from F.C. Kiryat Yam)
—	MF	(Israel) ISR	Amit Taktouk (from Hapoel Migdal HaEmek)
—	MF	(Israel) ISR	Yaniv Brik (from Bnei Yehuda)

Out:

No.	Pos.	Nation	Player
—	DF	(Israel) ISR	Mor Naaman (to F.C. Kiryat Yam)
—	MF	(Israel) ISR	Idan Goren (to Maccabi Bnei Reineh)

=== Hapoel Hadera ===
In:

No.	Pos.	Nation	Player

Out:

No.	Pos.	Nation	Player
—	GK	(Israel) ISR	Guy Herman (to Hapoel Petah Tikva)
—	GK	(Israel) ISR	Ohad Levita (to Bnei Yehuda)
—	FW	(Israel) ISR	Osher Eliyahu (to Hapoel Kfar Shalem, his player card still belongs to Macacbi Netanya)
—	FW	(Nigeria) NGA	James Adeniyi (to Hapoel Petah Tikva)

=== Hapoel Kfar Saba ===
In:

No.	Pos.	Nation	Player
—	GK	(Israel) ISR	Itay Sahar (loan return from Ironi Modi'in)
—	DF	(Israel) ISR	Noam Cohen (from Hapoel Ramat HaSharon)
—	FW	(Ghana) GHA	Faiz Abrahams (on loan from (South Africa) Stellenbosch)

Out:

No.	Pos.	Nation	Player
—	MF	(Israel) ISR	Mustapha Sheikh Yousef (to Bnei Sakhnin)

=== Hapoel Kfar Shalem ===
In:

No.	Pos.	Nation	Player
—	GK	(Israel) ISR	Roy Sason (on loan from Beitar Jerusalem)
—	DF	(Israel) ISR	Nehoray Kariv (on loan from Bnei Yehuda)
—	DF	(Portugal) POR	João Sidónio (from (Cyprus) Omonia Aradippou)
—	MF	(Israel) ISR	Guy Sivilia (from Bnei Yehuda)
—	FW	(Israel) ISR	Osher Eliyahu (on loan from Maccabi Netanya)

Out:

No.	Pos.	Nation	Player
—	GK	(Israel) ISR	Shahar Amsalem (to Hapoel Petah Tikva)
—	DF	(Israel) ISR	Tamir Haimovich (to Hapoel Kfar Shalem)
—	MF	(Israel) ISR	Solomon Daniel (Retired)
—	MF	(Israel) ISR	Reef Mesika (to Hapoel Acre)
—	MF	(Israel) ISR	Niv Ben Yosef (to Maccabi Ironi Kiryat Gat)
—	MF	(Israel) ISR	Tamir Adi (to F.C. Dimona)
—	FW	(Israel) ISR	Raz Stain (to Maccabi Kiryat Gat)
—	FW	(Cape Verde) CPV	Clé (to Hapoel Petah Tikva)

=== Hapoel Nof HaGalil ===
In:

No.	Pos.	Nation	Player
—	MF	(Israel) ISR	Matanel Tadesa (from Ironi Tiberias)
—	FW	(Israel) ISR	Idan Golan (from Hapoel Umm al-Fahm)

Out:

No.	Pos.	Nation	Player
—	DF	(Israel) ISR	Nevo Shedo (to Maccabi Bnei Reineh)

=== Hapoel Ramat Gan ===
In:

No.	Pos.	Nation	Player
—	DF	(Israel) ISR	Dudu Twito (from Ironi Kiryat Shmona)
—	FW	(Israel) ISR	David Asanka (from Beitar Nordia Jerusalem)

Out:

No.	Pos.	Nation	Player
—	DF	(Israel) ISR	Raz Nachmias (to Bnei Yehuda)
—	DF	(Israel) ISR	Ronny Laufer (to F.C. Kiryat Yam)
—	DF	(Israel) ISR	Matan Levi (to Bnei Yehuda)
—	MF	(Israel) ISR	Sagi Dror (to Bnei Yehuda)
—	MF	(Israel) ISR	Omri Shamir (to Maccabi Netanya)
—	FW	(Israel) ISR	Shavit Mazal (to Hapoel Petah Tikva)
—	FW	(Israel) ISR	Mor Buskila (to Hapoel Tel Aviv)

=== Hapoel Rishon LeZion ===
In:

No.	Pos.	Nation	Player
—	MF	(Ivory Coast) CIV	Junior Magico Traoré (from (Armenia) Shirak)
—	MF	(Israel) ISR	Evyatar Mizrahi (from Shimshon Tel Aviv)
—	MF	(Israel) ISR	Amit Zur (on loan from Maccabi Tel Aviv)
—	MF	(Republic of the Congo) CGO	Leroy Mondzenga (from Maccabi Bnei Reineh)

Out:

No.	Pos.	Nation	Player
—	MF	(Israel) ISR	Shay Ayzen (to Maccabi Herzliya)
—	MF	(Israel) ISR	Moshe Semel (to (Hungary) Puskás Akadémia)

=== Hapoel Ra'anana ===
In:

No.	Pos.	Nation	Player

Out:

No.	Pos.	Nation	Player
—	GK	(Israel) ISR	Benjamin Machini (to Hapoel Ramat HaSharon)
—	MF	(Israel) ISR	Ofir Mizrahi (to Ironi Nesher)
—	MF	(Israel) ISR	Sean Buskila (to F.C. Holon Yermiyahu)
—	FW	(Israel) ISR	Sagi Genis (to Ironi Modi'in, his player cars still belongs to Hapoel Tel Aviv)

=== Ironi Modi'in ===
In:

No.	Pos.	Nation	Player
—	GK	(Israel) ISR	Tamir Stoller (from Hapoel Ramat HaSharon)
—	FW	(Israel) ISR	Sagi Genis (on loan from Hapoel Tel Aviv)

Out:

No.	Pos.	Nation	Player
—	GK	(Israel) ISR	Itay Sahar (loan return to Hapoel Kfar Saba)
—	FW	(Israel) ISR	Eli Elbaz (to Hakoah Amidar Ramat Gan)

=== Maccabi Herzliya ===
In:

No.	Pos.	Nation	Player
—	MF	(Israel) ISR	Shay Ayzen (from Hapoel Rishon LeZion)
—	MF	(Israel) ISR	Ofek Mishan (on loan from Hapoel Tel Aviv)

Out:

No.	Pos.	Nation	Player
—	MF	(Israel) ISR	Sagas Tambi (to F.C. Kafr Qasim)

=== Maccabi Jaffa ===
In:

No.	Pos.	Nation	Player
—	DF	(Israel) ISR	Ofer Gelbard (on loan from Hapoel Tel Aviv)
—	FW	(Israel) ISR	Gil Itzhak (from Bnei Yehuda)

Out:

No.	Pos.	Nation	Player

=== Maccabi Petah Tikva ===
In:

No.	Pos.	Nation	Player
—	DF	(Israel) ISR	Ben Vehava (from Ironi Tiberias)
—	FW	(Israel) ISR	Mohammed Khatib (from F.C. Kafr Qasim)
—	FW	(Ghana) GHA	Samuel Owusu (from (Serbia) OFK Belgrade)

Out:

No.	Pos.	Nation	Player
—	DF	(Israel) ISR	Yarden Cohen (to Beitar Jerusalem)
—	DF	(Ukraine) UKR	Daniel Joulani (to Maccabi Haifa, previously loaned to Bnei Sakhnin)
—	MF	(Israel) ISR	Eden Shamir (to Bnei Sakhnin)
—	FW	(Israel) ISR	Anas Mahamid (to Hapoel Tel Aviv)
