= Thierry Etoungou =

Cameroonian footballer

Personal information
- Full name: Amougou Ignace Thierry Etongou
- Date of birth: 22 September 1999 (age 27)
- Place of birth: Yaounde, Cameroon
- Height: 1.87 m (6 ft 1 1/2 in)
- Position: Defender

Team information
- Current team: F.C. Kiryat Yam
- Number: 5

Youth career
- AS Fortuna

Senior career*
| Years | Team | Apps | (Gls) |
| 2022 | AS Fortuna | | |
| 2022–2025 | Radnički Niš | 31 | (0) |
| 2025– | F.C. Kiryat Yam | 31 | (0) |
- * Club domestic league appearances and goals as of 24 June 2026

Amougou Ignace Thierry Etongou (born 22 September 1999) is a Cameroonian professional footballer who plays as a defender for Israeli club F.C. Kiryat Yam.

== Club career ==
Born in Yaounde, he played with AS Fortuna in 2022. In summer 2022, he moved to Europe, and after trials, he signed with Serbian top tier club Radnički Niš.
