= Itay Zada =

Israeli footballer (born 2002)

Personal information
- Date of birth: 1 November 2002 (age 24)
- Place of birth: Jerusalem
- Position: Midfielder

Team information
- Current team: Maccabi Jaffa

Youth career
- 2012–2020: Hapoel Katamon
- 2020–2021: Hapoel Jerusalem

Senior career*
Years	Team	Apps	(Gls)
2021–	Hapoel Jerusalem	40	(0)
2024	→ Ironi Tiberias	13	(1)
2024–2025	→ Hapoel Rishon LeZion	32	(3)
2025–2026	→ Hapoel Kfar Saba	16	(1)
2026–	→ Maccabi Jaffa	18	(0)
- * Club domestic league appearances and goals as of 24 June 2026

Itay Zada (Hebrew: איתי זאדה; born 1 November 2002) is an Israeli professional footballer who plays as a midfielder for Liga Leumit club Maccabi Jaffa.

His father is the manager Lior Zada.

== Club career ==
=== Hapoel Jerusalem ===
Zada started his football career in the Hapoel Katamon youth ranks. On 15 March 2021 made his senior debut in the 1–0 win against Hapoel Kfar Shalem.

On 10 January 2024 loaned to Ironi Tiberias.

== Career statistics ==
=== Club ===
As of 24 June 2026

Club	Season	League			State Cup		Toto Cup		Continental		Other		Total	
Club	Season	Division	Apps	Goals	Apps	Goals	Apps	Goals	Apps	Goals	Apps	Goals	Apps	Goals
Hapoel Jerusalem	2020–21	Liga Leumit	2	0	1	0	2	0	0	0	0	0	5	0
Hapoel Jerusalem	2021–22	Israeli Premier League	10	0	1	0	5	0	0	0	0	0	16	0
Hapoel Jerusalem	2022–23	Israeli Premier League	20	0	0	0	5	1	0	0	0	0	25	1
Hapoel Jerusalem	2023–24	Israeli Premier League	8	0	0	0	5	1	0	0	0	0	13	1
Hapoel Jerusalem	Total		40	0	2	0	17	2	0	0	0	0	59	2
Ironi Tiberias	2023–24	Liga Leumit	13	1	1	0	0	0	0	0	0	0	14	1
Ironi Tiberias	Total		13	1	1	0	0	0	0	0	0	0	14	1
Hapoel Rishon LeZion	2024–25	Liga Leumit	32	3	1	0	3	0	0	0	0	0	36	3
Hapoel Rishon LeZion	Total		32	3	1	0	3	0	0	0	0	0	36	3
Hapoel Kfar Saba	2025–26	Liga Leumit	16	1	2	0	4	0	0	0	0	0	22	1
Hapoel Kfar Saba	Total		16	1	2	0	4	0	0	0	0	0	22	1
Maccabi Jaffa	2025–26	Liga Leumit	18	0	1	0	0	0	0	0	0	0	19	0
Maccabi Jaffa	Total		18	0	1	0	0	0	0	0	0	0	19	0
Career total			119	5	7	0	24	2	0	0	0	0	150	7
