= Denis Kulikov =

Israeli association footballer (born 2004)

Personal information
- Date of birth: 24 August 2004 (age 22)
- Place of birth: Ariel, Israel
- Height: 1.88 m (6 ft 2 in)
- Position: Centre-back

Team information
- Current team: Maccabi Netanya
- Number: 5

Youth career
- 2013–2017: F.C. Ironi Ariel
- 2017–2019: Maccabi Petah Tikva
- 2019–2021: Beitar Tubruk
- 2021–2024: Maccabi Netanya

Senior career*
Years	Team	Apps	(Gls)
2023–	Maccabi Netanya	31	(0)
2024–2025	→ Ironi Kiryat Shmona	18	(1)

International career^{‡}
2021	Israel U-18	3	(0)
2022–2023	Israel U-19	5	(0)
2023–	Israel U-21	2	(0)
- * Club domestic league appearances and goals as of 24 June 2026 ‡ National team caps and goals as of 21 November 2023

Denis Kulikov (Hebrew: דניס קוליקוב; born 24 August 2004) is an Israeli footballer who plays as a center-back for Israeli Premier League club Maccabi Netanya and the Israel national under-21 team.

== Early life ==
Kulikov was born and raised in Ariel, Israel.

== Club career ==
=== Early career ===
Kulikov started his career in Ironi Ariel's youth team. Later moved to Maccabi Petah Tikva, Beitar Tubruk and age of 17 to Maccabi Netanya.

=== Maccabi Netanya ===
On 15 May 2023, Season 2022–23, he made his debut in a 5–1 loss to Maccabi Haifa at Netanya Stadium.

On 15 August 2024 loaned to Ironi Kiryat Shmona.

== International career ==
On 3 September 2023, Kulikov was called up to the Israel national under-21 team, ahead of its 2025 UEFA European Under-21 Championship qualification three away matches. He then made his debut with the Israeli U21 squad on 17 November 2023, in a 2–1 away loss to Poland U21.

== Career statistics ==
=== Club ===
As of 1 June 2025

Appearances and goals by club, season and competition
Club	Season	League			National cup		League cup (Note: Includes the Israel Toto Cup (Ligat Ha'Al))		Continental		Other		Total	
Club	Season	Division	Apps	Goals	Apps	Goals	Apps	Goals	Apps	Goals	Apps	Goals	Apps	Goals
Maccabi Netanya	2022–23	Israeli Premier League	2	0	0	0	0	0	–		0	0	2	0
Maccabi Netanya	2023–24	Israeli Premier League	6	0	0	0	1	0	–		0	0	7	0
Maccabi Netanya	2025–26	Israeli Premier League	0	0	0	0	1	0	–		0	0	0	0
Maccabi Netanya	Total		8	0	0	0	1	0	0	0	0	0	9	0
Maccabi Netanya	2024–25	Israeli Premier League	18	1	1	0	0	0	–		0	0	19	1
Maccabi Netanya	Total		18	1	1	0	0	0	0	0	0	0	19	1
Career total			26	1	1	0	1	0	0	0	0	0	28	1

== See also ==
- List of Jewish footballers
- List of Jews in sports
- List of Israelis
- List of Israel international footballers
