= David Tiram =

Israeli footballer

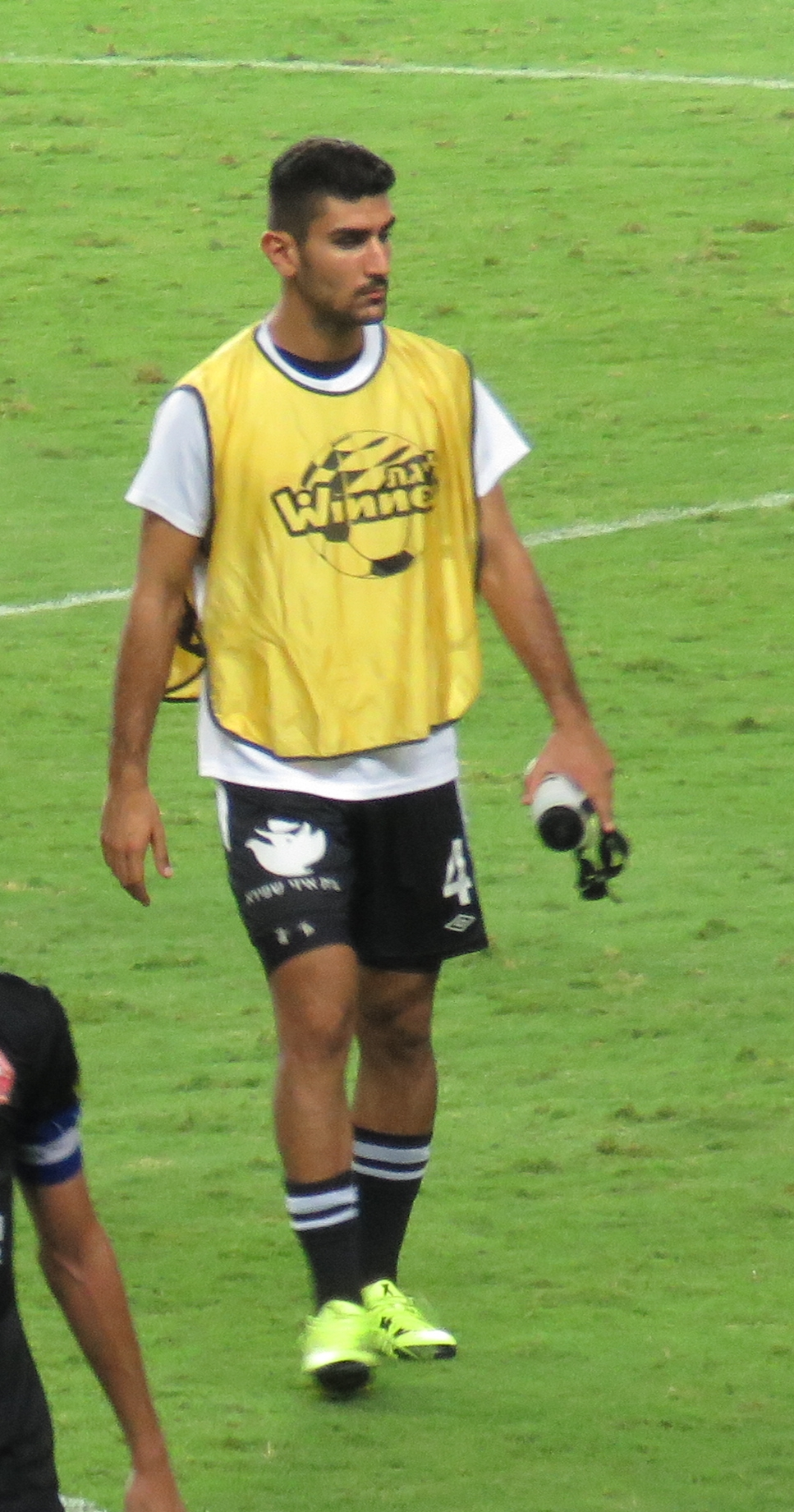
- Tiram with Maccabi Netanya 2015

Personal information
- Full name: David Adi "Dudi" Tiram
- Date of birth: September 16, 1993 (age 33)
- Place of birth: Pardesiya, Israel
- Height: 1.83 m (6 ft 0 in)
- Position: Centre back

Team information
- Current team: Maccabi Yavne

Youth career
- 2003–2006: Hapoel Pardesiya
- 2006–2013: Maccabi Netanya

Senior career*
Years	Team	Apps	(Gls)
2013–2015	Maccabi Netanya	1	(0)
2014	→ Kafr Qasim (loan)	13	(1)
2014–2015	→ Maccabi Kiryat Gat (loan)	33	(3)
2015–2016	Hapoel Ra'anana	15	(0)
2016–2017	Hapoel Ramat Gan	30	(3)
2017–2019	Maccabi Netanya	39	(4)
2019	Astra Giurgiu	1	(1)
2019–2021	F.C. Ashdod	7	(0)
2021	Hapoel Ra'anana	13	(1)
2021–2024	Hapoel Ramat HaSharon	103	(4)
2025–2026	Maccabi Jaffa	30	(0)
2026–	Maccabi Yavne	10	(0)
- * Club domestic league appearances and goals as of 24 October 2026

David "Dudi" Tiram (Hebrew: דוד תירם; born 16 September 1993) is an Israeli footballer who plays for Maccabi Yavne.

== Career ==
Tiram started playing youth football with Hapoel Pardesyia, and moved to Maccabi Netanya in 2006. In 2013, Tiram graduated to the senior team, and was loaned to F.C. Kafr Qasim and Maccabi Kiryat Gat to gain some playing time and hands-on experience.

At the beginning of the 2015–16 season, Tiram returned to Maccabi Netanya, and made his senior debut with the club On 22 August 2015, against Maccabi Petah Tikva. A day later, Tiram transferred to Hapoel Ra'anana, with which he made his debut on 29 August 2015.

In the 2016–17 season he played for Hapoel Ramat Gan in Liga Leumit and had a remarkable season with the club. In July 2017 Dudi left Hapoel Ramat Gan and returned to play for Maccabi Netanya.

On 28 June 2019, Tiram signed a two-years contract with Romanian club Astra Giurgiu.
