= Yorai Maliach =

Israeli footballer (born 1998)

Personal information
- Date of birth: 26 March 1998 (age 28)
- Place of birth: Jerusalem, Israel
- Height: 1.72 m (5 ft 8 in)
- Position: Right back

Team information
- Current team: Hapoel Rishon LeZion

Youth career
- Beitar Jerusalem

Senior career*
| Years | Team | Apps | (Gls) |
| 2018–2021 | Beitar Jerusalem | 0 | (0) |
| 2018–2019 | → Beitar Nordia Jerusalem (loan) | 24 | (2) |
| 2019–2021 | → Hapoel Jerusalem (loan) (Note: Hapoel Katamon Jerusalem F.C. until the name change to Hapoel Jerusalem in May 2020) | 53 | (1) |
| 2021–2024 | Hapoel Jerusalem | 26 | (0) |
| 2024– | Hapoel Rishon LeZion | 22 | (0) |

International career^{‡}
| 2014 | Israel U16 | 6 | (0) |
| 2014 | Israel U17 | 3 | (0) |
| 2015 | Israel U18 | 4 | (0) |
| 2016 | Israel U19 | 8 | (0) |
- * Club domestic league appearances and goals as of 28 April 2025 ‡ National team caps and goals as of 8 May 2024

Yorai Maliach (Hebrew: יוראי מליח; born 26 March 1998) is an Israeli professional footballer who plays as a right back for Liga Leumit club Hapoel Rishon LeZion.

== Early career ==
Maliach played in the youth sector of Beitar Jerusalem.

== Club career ==
He has represented Beitar Nordia Jerusalem and Hapoel Katamon Jerusalem. In 2021, he signed with Israeli Premier League club Hapoel Jerusalem on a permanent deal, after having spent previously time with the club on loan.

For the 2024–25 season, Maliach signed with Liga Leumit club Hapoel Rishon LeZion.

== International career ==
A former Israeli youth international, Maliach has played for Israel in under-16, under-17, under-18 and under-19 youth national teams.

== Personal life ==
Born and raised in Jerusalem, Israel, Maliach has a dual citizenship of Israel and Finland. He is of Yemeni descent on his father's side. His maternal grandmother is Finnish and his maternal grandfather is French of Polish descent, who had moved to Israel when six months old.

== Career statistics ==
As of 28 April 2025

Appearances and goals by club, season and competition
| Club | Season | League | | | National cup (Note: Includes Israel State Cup) | | Continental | | Other | | Total | |
| Club | Season | Division | Apps | Goals | Apps | Goals | Apps | Goals | Apps | Goals | Apps | Goals |
|---|---|---|---|---|---|---|---|---|---|---|---|---|
| Beitar Jerusalem | 2017–18 | Israeli Premier League | 0 | 0 | 0 | 0 | – | | – | | 0 | 0 |
| Beitar Nordia Jerusalem (loan) | 2018–19 | Liga Alef | 24 | 2 | 1 | 0 | – | | – | | 25 | 2 |
| Hapoel Katamon Jerusalem (loan) | 2019–20 | Liga Leumit | 27 | 0 | 1 | 0 | – | | – | | 28 | 0 |
| Hapoel Jerusalem (loan) | 2020–21 | Liga Leumit | 26 | 1 | 2 | 0 | – | | – | | 28 | 1 |
| Hapoel Jerusalem | 2021–22 | Israeli Premier League | 13 | 0 | 1 | 0 | – | | 1 (Note: Includes Toto Cup) | 0 | 15 | 0 |
| Hapoel Jerusalem | 2022–23 | Israeli Premier League | 9 | 0 | 0 | 0 | – | | 3 | 0 | 12 | 0 |
| Hapoel Jerusalem | 2023–24 | Israeli Premier League | 5 | 0 | 1 | 0 | – | | 3 | 0 | 9 | 0 |
| Hapoel Jerusalem | Total | | 27 | 0 | 2 | 0 | 0 | 0 | 7 | 0 | 36 | 0 |
| Hapoel Rishon LeZion | 2024–25 | Liga Leumit | 22 | 0 | 1 | 0 | – | | 0 | 0 | 23 | 0 |
| Career total | | | 126 | 3 | 7 | 0 | 0 | 0 | 7 | 0 | 140 | 3 |

== Honours ==
Hapoel Jerusalem

- Liga Leumit runner-up: 2020–21
