= Nikola Đurković (footballer, born 2002) =

Serbian-Israeli professional footballer

Nikola Djurković
Personal information
- Full name: Nikola Djurković
- Date of birth: 8 September 2002 (age 24)
- Place of birth: Belgrade, Serbia
- Height: 1.90 m (6 ft 3 in)
- Position: Goalkeeper

Team information
- Current team: Hapoel Hadera
- Number: 1

Youth career
- 2020–2021: Rad

Senior career*
Years	Team	Apps	(Gls)
2021–2023	Rad	71	(0)
2023–	Hapoel Hadera	20	(0)
2024–2025	→ Hapoel Acre	28	(0)
- * Club domestic league appearances and goals as of 24 June 2026

Nikola Djurkovic (born 15 February 2002) is a Serbian professional footballer who plays as a goalkeeper for Liga Leumit club Hapoel Hadera.

Djurkovic was born in Belgrade and played youth football with FK Rad before being promoted to the senior side and starting his professional career. After the club was relegated to the Serbian League Belgrade (third tier) in 2023, Djurkovic was released. He signed with Hapoel Hadera on a free transfer in September 2023.

== Early life ==
Djurkovic was born in Belgrade of Serbian-Jewish descent.

== Career ==
Djurkovic was promoted to the senior side at FK Rad in 2021 while still in the Prva liga Srbije (2nd tier). They were relegated at the end of the season.
