= Sagi Genis =

Israeli footballer

Sagi Genis שגיא גניס
Personal information
- Date of birth: 10 January 2004 (age 22)
- Place of birth: Hatzav, Israel
- Position: Forward

Team information
- Current team: Ironi Modi'in
- Number: 47

Senior career*
Years	Team	Apps	(Gls)
2022–	Hapoel Tel Aviv	15	(1)
2025	→ Hapoel Ra'anana	12	(1)
2025–	→ Ironi Modi'in	21	(3)

International career
2021	Israel U18	3	(2)
2022	Israel U19	9	(2)
- * Club domestic league appearances and goals as of 24 June 2026

Sagi Genis (Hebrew: שגיא גניס; born 10 January 2004) is an Israeli footballer who currently plays as a forward for Israeli club Hapoel Ra'anana.

== Early life ==
Genis was born in moshav Hatzav, Israel, to a family of Jewish descent. He grew up in moshav Bitzaron, Israel.

== Career statistics ==
=== Club ===
As of 18 June 2026.

Club	Season	League			State Cup		Toto Cup		Continental		Other		Total	
Club	Season	Division	Apps	Goals	Apps	Goals	Apps	Goals	Apps	Goals	Apps	Goals	Apps	Goals
Hapoel Tel Aviv	2021–22	Israeli Premier League	5	0	0	0	0	0	–		0	0	5	0
Hapoel Tel Aviv	2022–23	Israeli Premier League	2	0	0	0	0	0	–		0	0	2	0
Hapoel Tel Aviv	2023–24	Israeli Premier League	1	1	0	0	3	0	–		0	0	4	1
Hapoel Tel Aviv	2024–25	Liga Leumit	7	0	0	0	4	2	–		0	0	11	2
Hapoel Tel Aviv	Total		15	1	0	0	7	2	0	0	0	0	22	3
Hapoel Ra'anana	2024–25	Liga Leumit	11	1	0	0	0	0	–		0	0	11	1
Hapoel Ra'anana	Total		11	1	0	0	0	0	0	0	0	0	11	1
Ironi Modi'in	2025–26	Liga Leumit	21	3	1	0	0	0	–		0	0	22	3
Ironi Modi'in	Total		21	3	1	0	0	0	0	0	0	0	22	3
Career total			47	5	1	0	7	2	0	0	0	0	55	7

== See also ==
- List of Jewish footballers
- List of Jews in sports
- List of Israelis
