= Lidor Cohen =

Israeli footballer (born 1992)

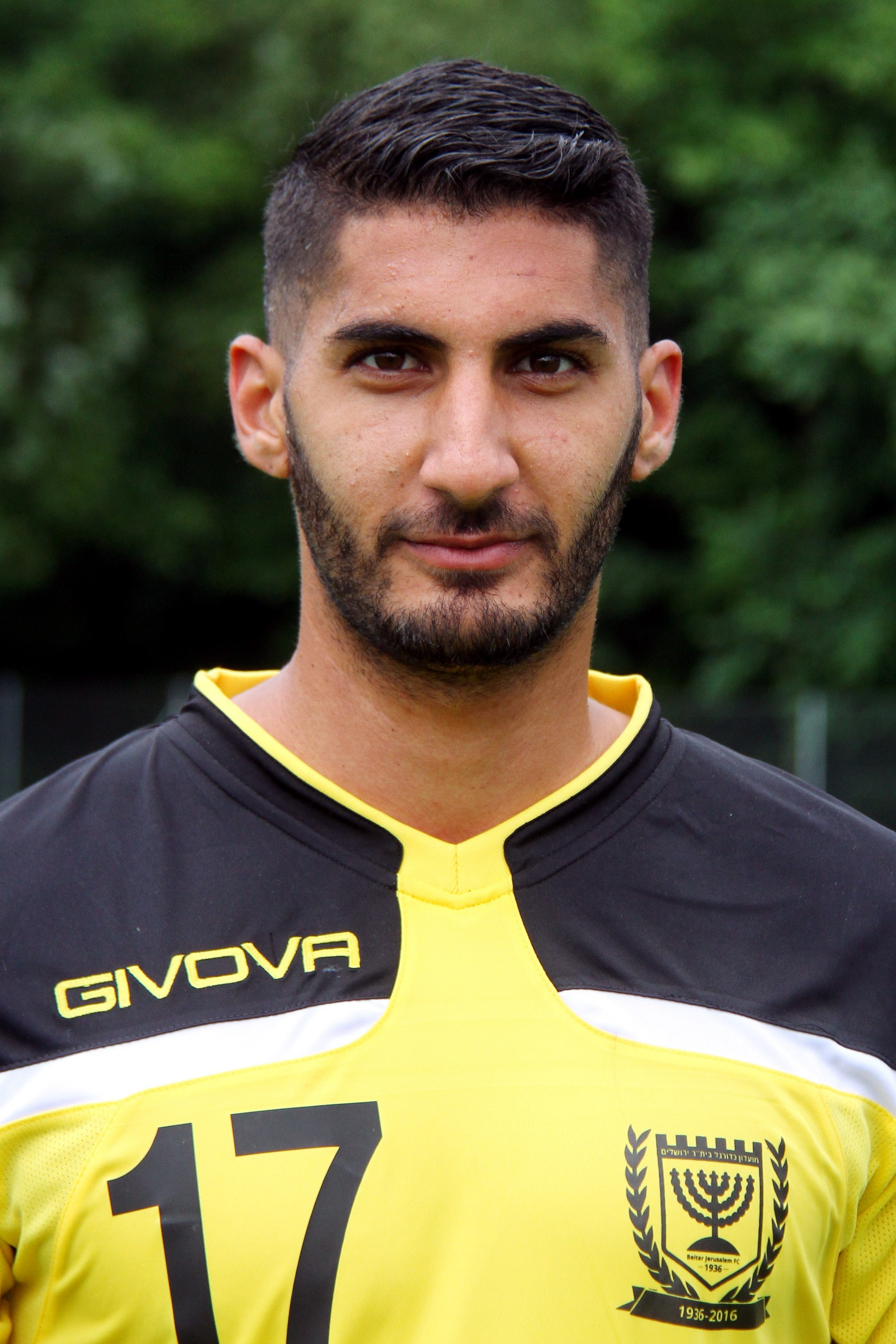
- Cohen with Beitar Jerusalem in 2016

Personal information
- Date of birth: 16 December 1992 (age 33)
- Place of birth: Petah Tikva, Israel
- Height: 1.86 m (6 ft 1 in)
- Position: Winger

Team information
- Current team: F.C. Kafr Qasim

Youth career
- Maccabi Petah Tikva

Senior career*
Years	Team	Apps	(Gls)
2012–2014	Maccabi Petah Tikva	16	(4)
2014–2017	Beitar Jerusalem	86	(15)
2017–2020	Maccabi Petah Tikva	100	(24)
2020–2021	Dila Gori	7	(1)
2021	Hapoel Tel Aviv	18	(1)
2021	Nongbua Pitchaya	1	(0)
2022–2023	BG Pathum United	9	(1)
2023	→ Khon Kaen United (loan)	14	(3)
2023–2024	Trat	30	(8)
2024–2025	Ironi Kiryat Shmona	29	(3)
2025–2026	F.C. Kiryat Yam	16	(4)
2026–	F.C. Kafr Qasim	18	(4)

International career
2014	Israel U21	2	(1)
- * Club domestic league appearances and goals as of 24 June 2026

Lidor Cohen (Hebrew: לידור כהן; born 16 December 1992) is an Israeli professional footballer who plays as a winger for Liga Leumit club F.C. Kafr Qasim.
