= Roy Nawi =

Israeli footballer

Personal information
- Full name: Aharon Roy Nawi
- Date of birth: April 3, 2004 (age 22)
- Place of birth: Or Yehuda, Israel
- Height: 1.81 m (5 ft 11 1/2 in)
- Position: Defensive midfielder

Team information
- Current team: Hapoel Haifa

Youth career
- 2013–2015: F.C. Or Yehuda
- 2015–2023: Maccabi Tel Aviv

Senior career*
Years	Team	Apps	(Gls)
2023–2026	Maccabi Tel Aviv	0	(0)
2023–2024	→ Hapoel Petah Tikva (loan)	31	(1)
2024–2026	→ Hapoel Haifa (loan)	30	(1)
2026–	Kryvbas Kryvyi Rih	7	(1)

International career^{‡}
2021	Israel U18	8	(0)
2022–2023	Israel U19	16	(0)
2023	Israel U20	7	(1)
2024–	Israel U21	2	(0)
Medal record
Representing Israel U-19
UEFA European Under-19 Championship
Runner-up	2022 Slovakia	Team
Representing Israel U-20
FIFA U-20 World Cup
Third place	2023 Argentina	Team
- * Club domestic league appearances and goals as of 1 June 2026 ‡ National team caps and goals as of 1 June 2024

Roy Nawi (Hebrew: רוי נאווי; born 3 April 2004) is an Israeli footballer who plays for Hapoel Haifa.

== Career statistics ==
=== Club ===
As of match played 1 June 2024

Appearances and goals by club, season and competition
Club	Season	League			State Cup		Toto Cup		Europe		Total	
Club	Season	Division	Apps	Goals	Apps	Goals	Apps	Goals	Apps	Goals	Apps	Goals
Hapoel Petah Tikva	2023–24	Israeli Premier League	30	1	3	0	4	0	–		37	1
Hapoel Haifa	2024–25	Israeli Premier League	0	0	0	0	0	0	0	0	0	0
Career total			30	1	3	0	4	0	0	0	37	1

== Honours ==
Maccabi Tel Aviv

- Israel Super Cup: 2024
