= Anis Porat Ayash =

Israeli footballer (born 2005)

Personal information
- Full name: Anis Porat Ayash
- Date of birth: 15 April 2005 (age 21)
- Place of birth: Misgav, Israel
- Height: 1.86 m (6 ft 1 in)
- Positions: Left back; left winger

Team information
- Current team: Hapoel Haifa (on loan from Maccabi Tel Aviv)

Youth career
- 2013–2017: Hapoel Sakhnin
- 2017–2023: Bnei Sakhnin

Senior career*
Years	Team	Apps	(Gls)
2023–2024	Bnei Sakhnin	17	(1)
2024–	Maccabi Tel Aviv	0	(0)
2024–2025	→ Bnei Sakhnin (loan)	6	(0)
2025–	→ Hapoel Haifa (loan)	30	(2)

International career^{‡}
2023–2024	Israel U19	7	(2)
2024–	Israel U21	0	(0)
- * Club domestic league appearances and goals as of 24 June 2026 ‡ National team caps and goals as of 22 February 2024

Anis Porat Ayash (Hebrew: אניס פורת עייאש, Arabic: أنيس بورات عياش; born 15 April 2005) is an Israeli professional footballer who plays as a left-winger for Israeli club Hapoel Haifa on loan from Maccabi Tel Aviv and the Israel national under-19 team.

== Early life ==
Porat Ayash was born in Misgav Regional Council for an Arab father and a Jewish mother. He started to play football in the Hapoel Sakhnin's children team. In 2017 moved to the youth team of Bnei Sakhnin.

== Club career ==
On 29 July 2023 he made his senior debut in the 1–0 win against Hapoel Haifa. On 29 August 2023 made his league debut in the 1–1 draw against Hapoel Tel Aviv and scored his debut goal in this game.

On 18 September 2024 signed for Maccabi Tel Aviv and loaned immediately back to Sakhnin until the end of the season.

== International career ==
Porat Ayash is a youth International for Israel, who plays for the under-19 national team since 2023.

== Career statistics ==
=== Club ===
As of 7 February 2025.

Club	Season	League			State Cup		Toto Cup		Continental		Other		Total	
Club	Season	Division	Apps	Goals	Apps	Goals	Apps	Goals	Apps	Goals	Apps	Goals	Apps	Goals
Bnei Sakhnin	2023–24	Israeli Premier League	14	1	1	0	5	0	–		0	0	20	1
Bnei Sakhnin	2024–25	Israeli Premier League	6	0	0	0	5	0	–		0	0	11	0
Bnei Sakhnin	Total		20	1	1	0	10	0	0	0	0	0	31	1
Hapoel Haifa	2024–25	Israeli Premier League	0	0	0	0	0	0	–		0	0	0	0
Hapoel Haifa	Total		0	0	0	0	0	0	0	0	0	0	0	0
Career total			20	1	1	0	10	0	0	0	0	0	31	1

== See also ==
- List of Jewish footballers
- List of Jews in sports
- List of Israelis
