= Ronny Laufer =

Israeli footballer (born 2001)

Personal information
- Date of birth: February 18, 2001 (age 25)
- Place of birth: Kfar Saba, Israel
- Height: 1.81 m (5 ft 11 1/2 in)
- Position: Center back

Team information
- Current team: Kfar Saba 1928

Youth career
- 2010–2017: Hapoel Kfar Saba
- 2017–2021: Maccabi Haifa

Senior career*
| Years | Team | Apps | (Gls) |
| 2021– | Maccabi Haifa | 0 | (0) |
| 2021–2023 | → Hapoel Afula | 49 | (1) |
| 2023–2024 | → Maccabi Petah Tikva | 5 | (0) |
| 2024–2025 | → Hapoel Ramat Gan | 12 | (2) |
| 2025–2026 | → F.C. Kiryat Yam | 4 | (0) |
| 2026– | → Kfar Saba 1928 | 2 | (0) |

International career
| 2017–2018 | Israel U17 | 7 | (0) |
| 2018 | Israel U18 | 6 | (0) |
| 2019–2020 | Israel U19 | 19 | (0) |
- * Club domestic league appearances and goals as of 1 November 2025

Ronny Laufer (Hebrew: רוני לאופר; born 18 February 2001) is an Israeli professional footballer who plays as a center-back for Liga Leumit club F.C. Kiryat Yam. He is the son of a famous Boca Juniors fan, Alejandro Laufer.

Laufer started his career on Hapoel Kfar Saba's children team and at age 16 signed to Maccabi Haifa. On 25 July 2021, he was loaned to Hapoel Afula. On 9 July 2023, he was loaned to the Israeli Premier League club Maccabi Petah Tikva.
