= Roei Alkukin =

Israeli footballer

Personal information
- Full name: Roei Alkukin
- Date of birth: 7 April 2004 (age 22)
- Place of birth: Mevaseret Zion, Israel
- Position: Midfielder

Team information
- Current team: Hapoel Tel Aviv
- Number: 15

Youth career
- 2013–2018: Beitar Jerusalem
- 2018–2024: Hapoel Tel Aviv

Senior career*
Years	Team	Apps	(Gls)
2023–	Hapoel Tel Aviv	63	(6)
2024	→ Maccabi Herzliya (loan)	15	(0)

International career
2021	Israel U18	2	(0)
2022–2023	Israel U19	8	(0)
- * Club domestic league appearances and goals as of 15 June 2025

Roei Alkukin (Hebrew: רועי אלקוקין; born 7 April 2004) is an Israeli professional footballer who plays as a midfielder for Israeli Premier League club Hapoel Tel Aviv.

== Early life ==
Alkukin was born in Mevaseret Zion, Israel, to a family of both Sephardi Jewish and Mizrahi Jewish descent.

== Club career ==
On 30 June 2023 signed for 4 years for Israeli club Hapoel Tel Aviv.

== Career statistics ==
=== Club ===
As of 1 June 2025

Club	Season	League			State Cup		Toto Cup		Continental		Other		Total	
Club	Season	Division	Apps	Goals	Apps	Goals	Apps	Goals	Apps	Goals	Apps	Goals	Apps	Goals
Hapoel Tel Aviv	2022–23	Israeli Premier League	1	0	0	0	0	0	–		0	0	1	0
Hapoel Tel Aviv	2023–24	Israeli Premier League	0	0	0	0	1	0	–		0	0	1	0
Hapoel Tel Aviv	2024–25	Liga Leumit	29	2	4	1	4	1	–		0	0	37	4
Hapoel Tel Aviv	2025–26	Israeli Premier League	0	0	0	0	0	0	–		0	0	0	0
Hapoel Tel Aviv	Total		30	2	4	1	5	1	0	0	0	0	39	4
Maccabi Herzliya	2023–24	Liga Leumit	15	0	0	0	0	0	–		0	0	15	0
Maccabi Herzliya	Total		15	0	0	0	0	0	0	0	0	0	15	0
Career total			45	2	4	1	5	1	0	0	1	0	54	4
