= Nikita Khodorchenko =

Russian and Ukrainian footballer

Nikita Khodorchenko Никита Ходорченко
Personal information
- Full name: Nikita Ruslanovich Khodorchenko
- Date of birth: 19 June 2000 (age 26)
- Place of birth: Donetsk, Ukraine
- Height: 1.85 m (6 ft 1 in)
- Position: Defender

Team information
- Current team: Hapoel Umm al-Fahm

Youth career
- –2013: Shakhtar Donetsk
- 2014: Olimpik Donetsk
- 2014–2015: Azovstal Mariupol
- 2016: Knyazha Shchaslyve

Senior career*
Years	Team	Apps	(Gls)
2016–2019	Zirka Kropyvnytskyi	13	(0)
2019	Rukh Vynnyky	3	(0)
2019	Bazhanovets Makiivka		
2020–2022	Spartak-2 Moscow	14	(0)
2022–2024	Zvezda St. Petersburg	45	(0)
2024–	Hapoel Umm al-Fahm	12	(0)
- * Club domestic league appearances and goals as of 1 November 2024

Nikita Ruslanovich Khodorchenko (Russian: Никита Русланович Ходорченко; Ukrainian: Микита Русланович Ходорченко; born 19 June 2000) is a Russian and Ukrainian football player who plays for Israeli club Hapoel Umm al-Fahm.

== Club career ==
He made his debut in the Russian Football National League for FC Spartak-2 Moscow on 17 October 2020 in a game against FC Orenburg.
