= Roy Sason =

Israeli association football player (born 2001)

Roy Sason רוי ששון
Personal information
- Full name: Roy Sason
- Date of birth: 13 December 2001 (age 24)
- Place of birth: Lapid, Israel
- Height: 1.93 m (6 ft 4 in)
- Position: Goalkeeper

Team information
- Current team: Hapoel Kfar Shalem

Youth career
- 2009–2010: Maccabi Modi'in
- 2010–2014: Maccabi Tel Aviv
- 2014–2015: Maccabi Emek Hefer
- 2015–2017: Beitar Jerusalem

Senior career*
Years	Team	Apps	(Gls)
2021–	Beitar Jerusalem	4	(0)
2024–2025	→ Bnei Yehuda	28	(0)
2025–2026	→ Hapoel Kfar Shalem	34	(0)
2026-	הפועל פתח תקווה		

International career^{‡}
2024–	Israel Olympic	0	(0)
- * Club domestic league appearances and goals as of 24 June 2026 ‡ National team caps and goals as of 1 June 2025

Roy Sason (Hebrew: רוי ששון; born 12 December 2001) is an Israeli professional footballer who plays as a goalkeeper for Israeli club Hapoel Kfar Shalem.

== Club career ==
Sason started his career with Maccabi Modi'in's boys' team. He also played in his youth with Maccabi Tel Aviv and Maccabi Emek Hefer before joining the youth team of Beitar Jerusalem when he was 14.

On 26 October 2022 made his senior team in the 1–1 draw against Sektzia Ness Ziona in the Toto Cup competition. Following the Gaza war, the first goalkeeper Miguel Silva didn't come back to Israel and Sason made his league debut in the 1–1 draw against Maccabi Haifa in Sammy Ofer Stadium. After Silva come back to Israel, Sason back to the bench.

On 20 June 2024 signed for new contract until 2028 and loaned to Bnei Yehuda.

== International career ==
Following the injury of Daniel Peretz, Sason called up to the Israel's Olympic football team squad competing in the men's tournament in the 2024 Summer Olympics.
