= Daniel Joulani =

Ukrainian footballer

Daniel Joulani דניאל גולאני
Personal information
- Full name: Daniel Joulani
- Date of birth: 19 March 2003 (age 23)
- Place of birth: Israel
- Height: 1.76 m (5 ft 9 in)
- Positions: Left back; winger; attacking midfielder

Team information
- Current team: Ironi Tiberias

Youth career
- 2011–2018: Hapoel Petah Tikva
- 2018–2022: Maccabi Petah Tikva

Senior career*
Years	Team	Apps	(Gls)
2020–2025	Maccabi Petah Tikva	18	(1)
2023–2024	→ Hapoel Kfar Saba (loan)	31	(4)
2024–2025	→ Bnei Sakhnin (loan)	23	(1)
2025–	Maccabi Haifa	0	(0)
2025–	→ Ironi Tiberias (loan)	23	(1)

International career^{‡}
2019	Ukraine U16	3	(1)
2019	Ukraine U17	1	(0)
- * Club domestic league appearances and goals as of 24 June 2026 ‡ National team caps and goals as of 14:53, 24 November 2020 (UTC)

Daniel Joulani (Hebrew: דניאל גולאני; Ukrainian: Даніель Джулані; born 19 March 2003), also known as Daniel Golani, is a professional footballer who plays as a left back for Ironi Tiberias on loan from Maccabi Haifa. Born in Israel, he has represented Ukraine at youth level.

== International career ==
Joulani's mother was born and raised in Ukraine. He is a youth international for Ukraine.

== Career statistics ==
=== Club ===
As of 1 June 2025

Club	Season	League			Cup		League Cup		Other		Total	
Club	Season	Division	Apps	Goals	Apps	Goals	Apps	Goals	Apps	Goals	Apps	Goals
Maccabi Petah Tikva	2019–20	Liga Leumit	7	1	1 (Note: Appearances in the Israel State Cup)	0	0	0	0	0	8	1
Maccabi Petah Tikva	2020–21	Ligat Ha`Al	9	0	1	0	3 (Note: Appearances in the Toto Cup)	0	0	0	13	0
Maccabi Petah Tikva	2021–22	Ligat Ha`Al	0	0	0	0	0	0	0	0	0	0
Maccabi Petah Tikva	2022–23	Liga Leumit	2	0	0	0	0	0	0	0	2	0
Maccabi Petah Tikva	Total		18	1	2	0	3	0	0	0	23	1
Hapoel Kfar Saba	2023–24	Liga Leumit	31	4	1	0	0	0	0	0	32	4
Bnei Sakhnin	2024–25	Israeli Premier League	23	1	3	0	0	0	0	0	26	1
Ironi Tiberias	2025–26	Israeli Premier League	0	0	0	0	0	0	0	0	0	0
Career total			72	6	6	0	3	0	0	0	81	6
