= Ron Unger =

Israeli footballer

Personal information
- Date of birth: 5 September 2001 (age 25)
- Place of birth: Hadera, Israel
- Height: 1.72 m (5 ft 8 in)
- Position: Right-back

Team information
- Current team: Maccabi Netanya
- Number: 17

Youth career
- 2010–2021: Hapoel Hadera

Senior career*
Years	Team	Apps	(Gls)
2021–2025	Hapoel Hadera	34	(0)
2024–2025	→ Maccabi Bnei Reineh (loan)	22	(0)
2025–	Ironi Tiberias	32	(0)
- * Club domestic league appearances and goals as of 18 May 2026

Ron Unger (born 5 September 2001) is an Israeli professional footballer who plays as a right-back for Israeli Premier League club Ironi Tiberias.
