= Ido Vaier =

Israeli footballer

Personal information
- Full name: Ido Vaier
- Date of birth: 10 October 1996 (age 30)
- Place of birth: Nesher, Israel
- Position: Right back

Team information
- Current team: Ironi Kiryat Shmona
- Number: 28

Youth career
- 2007–2011: Ironi Nesher
- 2011–2016: Hapoel Haifa

Senior career*
Years	Team	Apps	(Gls)
2016–2017	Hapoel Haifa	1	(0)
2017–2019	Ironi Nesher	24	(0)
2019–2020	Hapoel Herzliya	17	(2)
2020–2024	Maccabi Netanya	61	(0)
2024	Bnei Sakhnin	6	(0)
2024–2025	Hapoel Tel Aviv	20	(0)
2025–	Ironi Kiryat Shmona	11	(0)
- * Club domestic league appearances and goals as of 24 June 2026

Ido Vaier (Hebrew: עידו וייר; born 10 October 1996) is an Israeli professional footballer who plays as a right back.

== Career ==
On 21 January 2017 Vaier made his Israeli Premier League debut for Hapoel Haifa in the 1–0 win against Hapoel Ra'anana.

On 15 January 2024 signed for Bnei Sakhnin. In Sakhnin he rarely played, according to him it was because he went against the fans who booed during the singing of Hatikvah.

On 15 August 2024 signed for Hapoel Tel Aviv.
