= Shahar Rosen =

Israeli footballer

Personal information
- Full name: Shahar Rosen
- Date of birth: 29 September 2002 (age 24)
- Place of birth: Tel Aviv, Israel
- Position: Left back

Team information
- Current team: Hapoel Petah Tikva
- Number: 35

Youth career
- 2010–2021: Maccabi Tel Aviv

Senior career*
Years	Team	Apps	(Gls)
2021–	Maccabi Tel Aviv	0	(0)
2021–2022	→ Beitar Tel Aviv Bat Yam	25	(1)
2022–2023	→ Hapoel Kfar Saba	32	(2)
2023–2024	→ Bnei Yehuda	36	(1)
2024–2025	→ F.C. Ashdod	20	(0)
2025–	→ Hapoel Petah Tikva	26	(0)

International career
2018	Israel U16	2	(0)
2018–2019	Israel U17	3	(0)
- * Club domestic league appearances and goals as of 23 June 2026

Shahar Rosen (Hebrew: שחר רוזן; born 29 September 2002) is an Israeli footballer who plays as a left back for Hapoel Petah Tikva.

His grandfather is the former player Zvi Rosen.

== Career ==
On 25 August 2024 made his Israeli Premier League debut in the 2–3 loss to Beitar Jerusalem and sent-off in the 20th minute.
