= Nadav Nidam =

Israeli footballer (born 2001)

Nadav Niddam
Personal information
- Full name: Nadav Aviv Nidam
- Date of birth: 11 April 2001 (age 25)
- Place of birth: Modi'in, Israel
- Height: 1.80 m (5 ft 11 in)
- Position: Midfielder

Team information
- Current team: Hapoel Petah Tikva (on loan from Maccabi Tel Aviv)
- Number: 13

Youth career
- 2010–2014: Ironi Modi'in
- 2014–2020: Maccabi Tel Aviv

Senior career*
Years	Team	Apps	(Gls)
2019–	Maccabi Tel Aviv	1	(0)
2020–2021	→ Beitar Tel Aviv Bat Yam (loan)	34	(1)
2021–2022	→ Ironi Kiryat Shmona (loan)	32	(1)
2022–2024	→ Hapoel Jerusalem (loan)	54	(2)
2024–2025	→ Ironi Kiryat Shmona (loan)	29	(2)
2025–	→ Hapoel Petah Tikva (loan)	22	(0)

International career
2016	Israel U16	3	(0)
2017–2018	Israel U17	17	(0)
2018	Israel U18	4	(0)
2019	Israel U19	5	(2)
2022	Israel U21	1	(0)
- * Club domestic league appearances and goals as of 23 June 2026

Nadav Aviv Niddam (Hebrew: נדב נידם; born 11 April 2001) is an Israeli professional footballer who plays as a midfielder for Ironi Kiryat Shmona on loan from Maccabi Tel Aviv.

== Early life ==
Nidam was born in Modi'in, Israel, to a family of Jewish descent. His parents were English-born people of Jewish descent.

== Club career ==
After coming through the academy, Nidam made his professional league debut for Maccabi Tel Aviv in April 2019 as a late substitute in a 4–1 win over Maccabi Netanya.

== International career ==
Nidam has represented Israel at various youth international levels.
