= Ironi Tiberias F.C. =

Israeli football club

Ironi Tiberias
- Full name: Ironi Tiberias Football Club
- Nickname: Tiberians
- Founded: 2006
- Ground: Municipal Stadium, Tiberias
- Capacity: 4,500
- Owner: Dorot Group
- Chairman: Arie Kalmanzon & Mickey Bitan
- Manager: Eliran Hudeda
- League: Israeli Premier League
- 2025–26: Israeli Premier League, 9th of 14
Home colours	Away colours

Ironi Tiberias (Hebrew: עירוני טבריה) is an Israeli professional football club based in Tiberias. The club is not connected to Hapoel Tiberias, a former club which spent several seasons in the top division of Israeli football in the 1960s and the 1980s, making its last appearance in the top flight in 1989.

== History ==
Football was played in Tiberias before the Israeli Declaration of Independence. The first club in the city, Maccabi Tiberias, was formed in 1925 and was playing football as early as 1927. A year later, Maccabi Tiberias competed in the first ever edition of the Israel State Cup.

The best known club from Tiberias was Hapoel Tiberias, which played in the top division of the Israeli football in the 1960s, from 1961–62 to 1964–65, and again in 1988–89.

A third club operating in Tiberias during these years was Beitar Tiberias, although it mainly played in the lower levels of the Israeli league, its best performance being reaching Liga Bet, the third tier in the late 1960s and the 1970s.

By the late 1990s, both Maccabi and Hapoel had folded, and the only active club was Beitar Tiberias. In 2001 the club was merged with Hapoel Mo'atza Ezorit Galil Tahton to form Hapoel Galil Tahton/Tiberias. in 2007 the club changed its name to Ironi Tiberias.

In 2006–07 the club finished 2nd in Liga Bet North B and was promoted through play-offs. After several seasons in Liga Alef North, the club qualified for the promotion play-off at the end of the 2010–11 season, falling in the first round to Hapoel Asi Gilboa. In the following season, the club finished 2nd in Liga Alef, but didn't take part in the promotion play-offs, which involved only the league winner, Hapoel Asi Gilboa.

The club finished 2nd once again in 2013–14 and qualified for the promotion play-offs, and after beating Maccabi Daliyat al-Karmel, Hapoel Migdal HaEmek and Hapoel Azor, faced Hapoel Katamon Jerusalem in the decisive promotion/relegation play-offs. Tiberias won 5–1 on aggregate (3–0, 2–1) and was promoted to Liga Leumit. However, the club's spell in Liga Leumit lasted only one season, as they finished second bottom in the 2014–15 season and were relegated back to Liga Alef.

== Players ==
=== Current Squad ===
As of 8 November 2026

No.	Pos.	Nation	Player
1	GK	ISR	Gad Amos
3	MF	ISR	David Keltjens
5	DF	ISR	Nehoray Chen
7	FW	ISR	Samer Farhud (on loan from Hapoel Be'er Sheva)
8	MF	ISR	Ariel Cohen (on loan from Hapoel Tel Aviv)
10	MF	ISR	Bar Cohen
11	MF	ISR	Niv Gotlieb
12	FW	ISR	Qays Ghanem
13	DF	ISR	Ziv Morgan
14	DF	ISR	Guy Sanker
17	DF	ISR	Ron Unger
18	MF	ISR	Eden Shamir
19	DF	ISR	Gal Ma'atuk

No.	Pos.	Nation	Player
21	MF	ISR	Yarin Serdal
22	GK	ISR	Ido Sharon (on loan from Hapoel Tel Aviv)
23	MF	CIV	Chris Kouakou
26	MF	ISR	Ravid Shamay
27	MF	ISR	Yarin Swisa
30	FW	GAM	Mansour Badjie
37	DF	CZE	Ondřej Bačo
47	DF	UKR	Daniel Joulani (on loan from Maccabi Haifa)
55	GK	ISR	Jones Abu Ganima
77	FW	ISR	Agam Yehuda
84	FW	CIV	Néné Gbamblé
99	FW	ARM	Artur Miranyan

== Honours ==
=== League ===
Honour	No.	Years
Fourth tier	1	1966–68^{1}
Fifth tier	1	1996–97^{1}

^{1}As Beitar Tiberias
