= F.C. Kiryat Yam =

Israeli football club

Hapoel Kiryat Yam
- Full name: Sport Football Club Hapoel Kiryat Yam מועדון ספורט כדורגל הפועל קרית ים
- Founded: 2008; 18 years ago 2021; 5 years ago
- Ground: Kiryat Yam Stadium, Kiryat Yam
- Chairman: Nissim Tzarfati
- Manager: Maor Siso
- League: Liga Leumit
- 2025–26: Liga Leumit, 6th of 16
Home colours	Away colours

Football Club Kiryat Yam (Hebrew: מועדון ספורט קרית ים), is an Israeli football club based in Kiryat Yam. The club is currently in Liga Leumit.

== History ==
A chart showing the progress of M.S. Kiryat Yam through the Israeli football league system, from 2023–24 to the present

The club was founded in 2008 and played in Liga Gimel for three seasons, then was later dissolved.

The club was refounded in 2021 and promoted to Liga Bet. In the opening season at this level, they won all 22 league matches and became the first club in the history of Israeli football to go through a season with a 100% success record. The next season they were promoted to Liga Alef and finished the season with 28 wins and 2 draws.

On 19 December 2023 the club lost 0–1 to Hapoel Baqa al-Gharbiye and the unbeaten sequence was ended.

== Current Squad ==
As of 31 July 2026

No.	Pos.	Nation	Player
1	GK	ISR	Itay Hemi
2	DF	ISR	Razi Khalifa
3	DF	ISR	Fares Agbaria
4	DF	ISR	Ofek Atias
5	DF	CMR	Thierry Etoungou
7	FW	BLR	Ilya Potkin
8	MF	ISR	Artur Alyenikov
9	FW	ISR	Itay Buganim
10	MF	ISR	Gilad Avramov
11	MF	ISR	Yuval Cohen

No.	Pos.	Nation	Player
15	MF	ISR	Yinon Ohana
17	FW	ISR	Itay Solomon
18	MF	ISR	Liav Farada
20	MF	ISR	Liran Turgeman
26	MF	ISR	Nehorai Ifrach
29	MF	RSA	Ashley Cupido
30	GK	PLE	Omar Nahfaoui
55	MF	ISR	Ran Meir
77	DF	ISR	Tomer Lannes Arbel
99	FW	GUI	Sekou Sylla

== Honours ==
=== League ===
Honour	No.	Years
Fifth tier	1	2021–22
Fourth tier	1	2022–23
