= 2026–27 Maccabi Haifa F.C. season =

Football season

Maccabi Haifa
2026–27 season
- President: Ya'akov Shahar
- Head coach: Ran Ben-Shimon
- Stadium: Sammy Ofer
- Ligat Ha'Al: 5th
- State Cup: Round of 32
- Toto Cup: 10th
- Top goalscorer: League: Andrija Novakovich; Bruninho (4); All: Bruninho; Ethan Azoulay (5)
- Highest home attendance: 29,443 vs Hapoel Be'er Sheva (26 October 2026)
- Lowest home attendance: 5,142 vs Hapoel Jerusalem (17 August 2026)
- Average home league attendance: 19,688
Home colours	Away colours	Third colours
- All statistics correct as of 1 November 2025.

The 2026–27 season is Maccabi Haifa's 69th season in the Israeli Premier League, and their 45th consecutive season in the top division of Israeli football.

== Squad ==
=== Squad information ===
N	Pos.	Nat.	Name	Age	Since	App	Goals	Ends	Transfer fee	Notes
1	GK	(Israel)	Omer Nir'on	25	2026/2027	0	0	2026/2027	Free	Second nationality:Denmark
2	RB	(Israel)	Eli Dasa	33	2026/2027	4	0	2028/2029	Free	Second nationality:Ethiopia
3	CB	(Israel)	Sean Goldberg	31	2021/2022	183	4	2027/2028	Free	Second nationality:Italy
4	DM	(Niger)	Ali Mohamed (3rd captain)	31	2021/2022	222	2	2026/2027	€1,400,000	Second nationality:Israel
7	LW	(Israel)	Yair Mordechai	23	2026/2027	9	0	2029/2030	Free	
8	CM	(Israel)	Yarin Levi	21	2024/2025	14	0	2028/2029	Youth system	
9	CF	(United States)	Andrija Novakovich	30	2026/2027	10	4	2027/2028	Free	Second nationality:Serbia
10	AM	(Brazil)	Bruninho	26	2026/2027	15	5	2028/2029	€1,700,000	
11	LW	(Curaçao)	Kenji Gorré (captain)	32	2025/2026	44	7	2026/2027	Free	Second nationality:Netherlands
16	LM	(United States)	Kenny Saief	32	2023/2024	105	8	2026/2027	Free	Second nationality:Israel
17	LB	(Israel)	Yinon Fainegezict	20	2025/2026	26	0	2028/2029	Youth system	Second nationality:Poland
18	CF	(Israel)	Guy Melamed	33	2024/2025	51	20	2026/2027	1,500,000€	Second nationality:Lithuania
19	CM	(Israel)	Ethan Azoulay	24	2024/2025	84	15	2027/2028	€1,500,000	Second nationality:France
21	CB	(Suriname)	Nigel Lonwijk	24	2025/2026	14	0	2028/2029	€500,000	Second nationality:Netherlands
22	RB	(Israel)	Zohar Zasano	25	2025/2026	12	0	2026/2027	Free	Second nationality:Ethiopia
25	RB	(Belgium)	Jelle Bataille	27	2025/2026	54	0	2026/2027	Free	
26	RW	(Togo)	Silva Kani	23	2025/2026	40	7	2028/2029	€1,100,000	Second nationality:Togo
27	LB	(France)	Pierre Cornud	29	2022/2023	120	1	2027/2028	€800,000	Second nationality:Israel
29	RW	(Israel)	Eyad Khlaily	20	2024/2025	32	3	2027/2028	Youth system	
30	RW	(Portugal)	Pedro Brazão	23	2026/2027	7	2	2029/2030	Free	700,000€
31	CM	(Israel)	Amit Arazi	21	2024/2025	5	0	2029/2030	Youth system	
35	CB	(Israel)	Noam Sztejfman	18	2025/2026	19	2	2028/2029	Youth system	Second nationality:Austria
36	DM	(Israel)	Nevot Ratner	19	2025/2026	24	1	2028/2029	Youth system	Second nationality:Germany
37	CB	(Israel)	Elad Amir	20	2024/2025	14	1	2029/2030	Youth system	
38	CF	(Israel)	Adam Grimberg	17	2025/2026	10	2	2028/2029	Youth system	Second nationality:Romania
39	CB	(Israel)	Arad Gaist	18	2026/2026	0	0	2028/2029	Youth system	Second nationality:Romania
40	GK	(Israel)	Shareef Kayouf	25	2023/2024	97	0	2027/2028	Youth system	
42	LW	(Israel)	Liam Luski	17	2025/2026	3	0	2028/2029	Youth system	
44	CB	(Brazil)	Pedrão	29	2024/2025	26	0	2026/2027	€1,300,000	
45	CM	(Ivory Coast)	Cédric Don	22	2025/2026	22	2	2029/2030	€1,300,000	
55	GK	(Israel)	Omri Glazer (vice captain)	30	2015/2016	84	0	2028/2029	€300,000	Second nationality:Romania
66	LB	(Brazil)	Wenderson Tsunami	30	2026/2027	13	0	2028/2029	Free	
90	GK	(Israel)	Glenn Alvin	19	2025/2026	3	0	2027/2028	Youth system	

- Last updated: 8 November 2026
- Source: mhaifafc.com
- Ordered by squad number.

=== Current coaching staff ===
Position	Staff
Head Coach	(Israel) Ran Ben-Shimon
Assistant Coach	(Israel) David Martane
Sporting Director	(Israel) Lior Refaelov
Team Manager	(Israel) Roee Fucs
Physical trainer	(Israel) Lidor Ganon (Israel) Uri Harel (Israel) Gal Vaknin
Goalkeeping Coach	(Israel) Itay Zilpa

== Kits ==
- Supplier: Adidas
- Main Sponsor: Volvo
- Secondary Sponsor: Amram Avraham Group, Variety Israel, Haier

Home	Home alt.	Away	Away alt.	Third

Goalkeeper 1	Goalkeeper 2	Goalkeeper 3	Goalkeeper 4

== New contracts and transfers ==
=== New contracts ===
Date	Pos.	Player	Age	Expires	Source
31 May 2026	GK	(Israel) Mark Golankov	18	June 2029	
16 June 2026	CB	(Israel) Noam Sztejfman	18	June 2029	
16 June 2026	CF	(Israel) Adam Grimberg	17	June 2029	
10 August 2026	CM	(Israel) Amit Arazi	21	June 2030	
20 August 2026	CM	(Israel) Yarin Levi	21	June 2029	

=== Transfers in ===
Date	Pos.	Player	Age	From	Fee	Source
1 June 2026	LW	(Israel) Yair Mordechai	23	(Israel) Ironi Kiryat Shmona	€200,000	
2 July 2026	AM	(Brazil) Bruninho	26	(Ukraine) Karpaty Lviv	€1,700,000	
19 July 2026	CB	(Brazil) Wenderson Tsunami	30	(Turkey) Iğdır	Free	
21 July 2026	CF	(United States) Andrija Novakovich	30	(Italy) Reggiana	Free	
21 July 2026	GK	(Israel) Omri Glazer	30	(Serbia) Red Star Belgrade	€250,000	
24 July 2026	CB	(Suriname) Nigel Lonwijk	24	(England) Wolverhampton	€600,000	
4 September 2026	RW	(Portugal) Pedro Brazão	23	(Turkey) Bodrum	€700,000	4
11 October 2026	RB	(Israel) Eli Dasa	33	(Netherlands) NEC Nijmegen	Free	

=== Loans in ===
Date	Position	Player	Age	From	Fee	Source
16 August 2026	GK	(Israel) Omer Nir'on	25	(Israel) Maccabi Netanya	Free	

=== Loans return ===
Date	Position	Player	Age	From
30 June 2026	CM	(Israel) Yarin Levi	21	(Israel) Beitar Jerusalem
30 June 2026	LB	(Ukraine) Daniel Joulani	27	(Israel) Ironi Tiberias
30 June 2026	LW	(Israel) Eyad Khlaily	20	(Israel) Maccabi Bnei Reineh
30 June 2026	RB	(Israel) Getachew Yabelo	21	(Israel) Hapoel Kfar Saba
30 June 2026	CB	(Israel) Adir Waheb	20	(Israel) Hapoel Kfar Saba
30 June 2026	CB	(Israel) Tomer Lannes Arbel	20	(Israel) Hapoel Kfar Saba
30 June 2026	CM	(Israel) Itay Ehud	20	(Israel) Hapoel Kfar Saba
30 June 2026	CM	(Israel) Adi Tzur	20	(Israel) Hapoel Kfar Saba
30 June 2026	CM	(Israel) Amit Arazi	21	(Israel) Hapoel Kfar Saba
30 June 2026	LW	(Israel) Hamza Shibli	22	(Israel) Hapoel Kfar Saba
30 June 2026	CF	(Israel) Omer Dahan	21	(Israel) Hapoel Ra'anana
30 June 2026	RW	(Israel) Jad Shibli	20	(Israel) Hapoel Acre
30 June 2026	RW	(Israel) Nehoray Ifrah	23	(Israel) Hapoel Nof HaGalil
30 June 2026	CM	(Israel) Sarel Cohen	21	(Israel) Hapoel Hadera
30 June 2026	RB	(Israel) Ronny Laufer	24	(Israel) FC Kfar Saba
30 June 2026	DM	(Israel) Abed Elmajeed Shadafna	21	(Israel) Tzeirei Umm al-Fahm
30 June 2026	DM	(Israel) Goni Naor	20	(Greece) Larissa
30 June 2026	DM	(Israel) Liam Hermesh	22	(Moldova) Sheriff Tiraspol
30 June 2026	RW	(Curaçao) Xander Severina	25	(Portugal) Casa Pia
30 June 2026	LW	(Spain) Matías Nahuel	30	(Poland) Jagiellonia Białystok
30 June 2026	DM	(Angola) Manuel Cafumana "Show"	27	(Turkey) Kocaelispor

=== Transfers out ===
Date	Pos.	Player	Age	Type	To	Fee	Source
28 May 2026	GK	(Israel) Roee Fucs	27	Retired			
30 June 2026	CB	(Senegal) Abdoulaye Seck	34	End of Contract	(Saudi Arabia) Al Faisaly	Free Transfer	
30 June 2026	LW	(Israel) Suf Podgoreanu	24	End of Contract	(Belgium) Kortrijk	Free Transfer	
30 June 2026	AM	(Israel) Michael Ohana	31	End of Contract		Free Transfer	
1 July 2026	RW	(Curaçao) Xander Severina	25	Transfer	(Azerbaijan) Sabah	Future Transfer	
10 July 2026	CB	(Romania) Lisav Eissat	21	Transfer	(England) Bristol City	€2,500,000	
18 July 2026	DM	(Angola) Manuel Cafumana "Show"	27	Transfer	(Turkey) Kocaelispor	€500,000	
20 July 2026	DM	(Israel) Liam Hermesh	27	Transfer	(Austria) Grazer	Free Transfer	
24 July 2026	LW	(Israel) Dolev Haziza	31	Release	(Israel) Maccabi Netanya	Free Transfer	
25 July 2026	GK	(Ukraine) Heorhiy Yermakov	24	Transfer	(Ukraine) Kharkiv	€2,800,000	
3 August 2026	LW	(Spain) Matías Nahuel	30	Release	(Malaysia) Johor Darul Ta’zim	Free	
9 September 2026	RW	(Angola) Manuel Benson	29	Release	Free Agent		
13 September 2026	DM	(Israel) Goni Naor	27	Release	(Israel) Hapoel Ramat Gan Givatayim		

=== Loans out ===
Date	Pos.	Player	Age	To	Fee	Source
1 July 2026	RB	(Israel) Tomi Tsitsuashvili	20	(Israel) Hapoel Acre	Free loan	
1 July 2026	CM	(Israel) Sarel Cohen	21	(Israel) Hapoel Kfar Saba	Free loan	
9 July 2026	RB	(Israel) Getachew Yabelo	21	(Israel) Hapoel Ramat Gan Givatayim	Free loan	
9 July 2026	CF	(Israel) Niv Gabay	19	(Israel) Ironi Kiryat Shmona	Free loan	
12 July 2026	CB	(Israel) Tomer Lannes Arbel	20	(Israel) F.C. Kiryat Yam	Free loan	
20 July 2026	CF	(Jamaica) Trivante Stewart	26	(Turkey) Gaziantep	€150,000	
28 July 2026	AM	(Israel) Daniel Darzi	20	(Israel) Hapoel Kfar Saba	Free loan	
30 July 2026	CM	(Israel) Adi Tzur	20	(Israel) Hapoel Kfar Saba	Free loan	
30 July 2026	CB	(Israel) Liam Eissat	20	(Israel) Hapoel Tirat HaCarmel	Free loan	
3 August 2026	RW	(Israel) Nehoray Ifrah	23	(Israel) F.C. Kiryat Yam	Free loan	
4 August 2026	CB	(Israel) Adir Waheb	20	(Israel) Hapoel Kfar Saba	Free loan	
4 August 2026	DM	(Israel) Itay Ehud	20	(Israel) Hapoel Petah Tikva	Free loan	
4 August 2026	LB	(Ukraine) Daniel Joulani	27	(Israel) Ironi Tiberias	Free loan	
19 August 2025	DM	(Nigeria) Peter Agba	23	(Hungary) Győri	Free loan	
8 September 2026	DM	(Israel) Lior Kasa	21	(Israel) Maccabi Petah Tikva	Free loan	

=== End of loan ===
Date	Pos.	Player	Age	To	Fee	Source
30 June 2026	CF	(Serbia) Đorđe Jovanović	27	(Switzerland) FC Basel	Free	

== Pre-season and friendlies ==
4 July 2026	Maccabi Haifa (Israel)	2–1	(Scotland) Dundee	Telki
19:00	Mordechai 7'; Azoulay 17'	Report	58' Bevan	Stadium: Globall Football Park

8 July 2026	Maccabi Haifa (Israel)	3–3	(Hungary) Paks	Telki
18:00	Don 23'; Mordechai 55'; Silva 84'	Report	34' Pető; 36' Hahn; 90' Haraszti	Stadium: Globall Football Park

14 July 2026	Maccabi Haifa	2–0	F.C. Kiryat Yam	Haifa
18:00	Pedrão 35'; Ratner 84'	Report		Stadium: Ketzef

21 July 2026	Hapoel Kfar Saba	0–5	Maccabi Haifa	Kfar Saba
18:30		Report	Grimberg 15'; Mordechai 20'; Azoulay 40' (pen.); Khlaily 74'; Melamed 85'	Stadium: Levita Stadium; Referee: Yoav Mizrahi

== Competitions ==
=== Overview ===
Competition	First match	Last match	Starting round	Final position	Record							
Competition	First match	Last match	Starting round	Final position	Pld	W	D	L	GF	GA	GD	Win %
Ligat Ha'Al	22 August 2026	May 2027	Matchday 1	TBD	10	6	0	4	21	20	+1	60.00
State Cup	December 2026	TBD	Round of 32	TBD	0	0	0	0	0	0	+0	—
Toto Cup	25 July 2026	17 August 2026	Group Stage	10th	5	2	0	3	7	9	−2	40.00
Total					15	8	0	7	28	29	−1	53.33

Last updated: 8 November 2026
Source: Competitions

== Ligat Ha'Al ==
=== Regular season ===
==== Regular season table ====
Pos	Team	Pld	W	D	L	GF	GA	GD	Pts	Qualification
3	Hapoel Be'er Sheva	10	7	1	2	22	13	+9	22	Qualification for the Championship round
4	Beitar Jerusalem	10	5	3	2	14	11	+3	18	Qualification for the Championship round
5	Maccabi Haifa	10	6	0	4	21	20	+1	18	Qualification for the Championship round
6	Maccabi Netanya	10	4	4	2	16	8	+8	16	Qualification for the Championship round
7	Bnei Sakhnin	10	3	4	3	8	8	0	13	Qualification for the Relegation round

Updated to match(es) played on 8 November 2026. Source:
Rules for classification: 1) Points; 2) Goal difference; 3) Matches won; 4) Goals scored; 5) Head-to-head points; 6) Head-to-head goal difference; 7) Head-to-head goals scored; 8) Play-off.

Win Draw Loss

22 August 2026 1	Maccabi Haifa	2-1	Hapoel Ramat Gan	Haifa
20:30	Bruninho 22', 46'; Bataille (yellow card) 33'; Pedrão (yellow card) 40'; Lonwijk (yellow card) 78'; Azoulay (penalty missed) 89	Report	(yellow card) 18' Getachew; (yellow card) 45' Twito; 61' Plakuschenko; (yellow card) 69' Mijailović	Stadium: Sammy Ofer Stadium; Attendance: 24,197; Referee: Omer Biran

31 August 2026 2	Maccabi Tel Aviv	3-1	Maccabi Haifa	Tel Aviv
20:30	Shlomo (yellow card) 9'; Peretz 14' (pen.), 44'; Sissokho (yellow card) 71'; Davida 72'	Report	(yellow card) 33' Tsunami; (yellow card) 44', (goal) 88' (pen.) Azoulay; (yellow card) 74' Mordechai; (yellow card) 81' Pedrão	Stadium: Bloomfield Stadium; Attendance: 27,114; Referee: Snir Levi

5 September 2026 3	Maccabi Haifa	2-1	Hapoel Petah Tikva	Haifa
20:30	Novakovich 55'; Ratner (yellow card) 69'; Azoulay (yellow card) 74'; Bruninho 85'	Report	(penalty missed) 43 Clé; (yellow card) 46' Altman; 78' Amian	Stadium: Sammy Ofer Stadium; Attendance: 23,412; Referee: Aviad Shiloach

14 September 2026 4	Ironi Kiryat Shmona	0-4	Maccabi Haifa	Netanya
20:00	Benbenisti (red card) 26'; Sola (yellow card) 45+2'	Report	(yellow card) 11' Mordechai; 40' Azoulay; 56', (yellow card) 60' Brazão; (yellow card) 60' Bataille; (yellow card) 65' Bruninho; 66' Sztejfman; (yellow card) 81' Mohamed; 86' Tsunami	Stadium: Netanya Stadium; Attendance: 6,816; Referee: Aviv Klein

19 September 2026 5	Maccabi Haifa	3-2	Ironi Tiberias	Haifa
20:30	Novakovich 5', 69'; Saief (yellow card) 41'; Nigel Lonwijk (yellow card) 90+2'; Gorré 63' (pen.)	Report	Ghanem 28', 57' (pen.)	Stadium: Sammy Ofer Stadium; Attendance: 26,213; Referee: David Foxmam

12 October 2026 6	Hapoel Jerusalem	1-4	Maccabi Haifa	Jerusalem
20:30	Chilufya (yellow card) 17'; Idoko 26'; Madmon (yellow card) 45+2'	Report	(yellow card) 36', (goal) 40' Novakovich; 44' Brazão; (yellow card) 62' Saief; 66' Gorré; 77' Melamed	Stadium: Teddy Stadium; Attendance: 3,328; Referee: Snir Levi

17 October 2026 7	Maccabi Petah Tikva	1-2	Maccabi Haifa	Petah Tikva
19:30	Eyal Inbrum 13'; Ido Cohen (yellow card) 45+1'	mhaifafc.com/matches/10011	61', (yellow card) 71' Azoulay; 66' Sztejfman; (yellow card) 76' Brazão	Stadium: HaMoshava Stadium; Attendance: 11,000; Referee: Aviv Klein

26 October 2026 8	Maccabi Haifa	2-5	Hapoel Be'er Sheva	Haifa
19:30	Azoulay (yellow card) 5'; Brazão (yellow card) 45+2'; Novakovich (yellow card) 51'; Sztejfman (red card) 55'; Bruninho (penalty missed) 60; Ratner (yellow card) 74'; Grimberg 77', 90+2'	Report	(yellow card) 8', (goal) 53' Diop; (yellow card) 45+2' Ahmed; 50', 56' (pen.) Zlatanović; (yellow card) 76' Kna'an; 77' Forson; 85' (o.g.) Grimberg	Stadium: Sammy Ofer Stadium; Attendance: 29,443; Referee: Orel Grinfeld

2 November 2026 9	Hapoel Tel Aviv	1-2	Maccabi Haifa	Tel Aviv
20:30	Owusu (yellow card) 4'; Tsunami 8' (o.g.); Dappa 44'; Coco (yellow card) 60'; Kraev (yellow card) 60'; Tzur (yellow card) 90+4'	Report	(yellow card) 25' Bataille; 58' Bruninho; (yellow card) 60' Azoulay; (yellow card) 60' Novakovich	Stadium: Bloomfield Stadium; Attendance: 25,700; Referee: Gal Leibovitz

7 November 2026 10	Maccabi Haifa	0-4	Maccabi Netanya	Haifa
17:30	Dasa (yellow card) 6'; Brazão (yellow card) 85'	Report	(yellow card) 16' Morozov; 85' (o.g.) Novakovich; (yellow card) 60' Levi; 71' Bilu; 87' Niddam; 88' Almog	Stadium: Sammy Ofer Stadium; Attendance: 27,129; Referee: Snir Levi

28 November 2026 11	Bnei Sakhnin	v	Maccabi Haifa	Sakhnin
15:00				Stadium: Doha Stadium

2 December 2026 12	Maccabi Haifa	v	Beitar Jerusalem	Haifa
20:30				Stadium: Sammy Ofer Stadium

5 December 2026 13	Hapoel Haifa	v	Maccabi Haifa	Haifa
19:30				Stadium: Sammy Ofer Stadium

12 December 2026 14	Hapoel Ramat Gan	v	Maccabi Haifa	Rehovot
17:30				Stadium: Rehovot Stadium

21 December 2026 15	Maccabi Haifa	v	Maccabi Tel Aviv	Haifa
20:30				Stadium: Sammy Ofer Stadium

29 December 2026 16	Hapoel Petah Tikva	v	Maccabi Haifa	Petah Tikva
19:45				Stadium: HaMoshava Stadium

2 January 2027 17	Maccabi Haifa	v	Hapoel Ironi Kiryat Shmona	Haifa
15:00				Stadium: Sammy Ofer Stadium; Referee: Snir Levi

9 January 2027 18	Ironi Tiberias	v	Maccabi Haifa	Nof HaGalil
				Stadium: Barel Stadium

16 January 2027 19	Maccabi Haifa	v	Hapoel Jerusalem	Haifa
				Stadium: Sammy Ofer Stadium

23 January 2027 20	Maccabi Haifa	v	Maccabi Petah Tikva	Haifa
				Stadium: Sammy Ofer Stadium

30 January 2027 21	Hapoel Be'er Sheva	v	Maccabi Haifa	Be'er Sheva
				Stadium: Turner Stadium

6 February 2027 22	Maccabi Haifa	v	Hapoel Tel Aviv	Haifa
				Stadium: Sammy Ofer Stadium

13 February 2027 23	Maccabi Netanya	v	Maccabi Haifa	Netanya
				Stadium: Netanya Stadium

20 February 2027 24	Maccabi Haifa	v	Bnei Sakhnin	Haifa
				Stadium: Sammy Ofer Stadium

27 February 2027 25	Beitar Jerusalem	v	Maccabi Haifa	Jerusalem
				Stadium: Teddy Stadium

6 March 2027 26	Maccabi Haifa	v	Hapoel Haifa	Haifa
				Stadium: Sammy Ofer Stadium

=== Overall ===
==== Results overview ====
Win Draw Loss

Opposition	Regular season	
Opposition	Home score	Away score
Beitar Jerusalem		
Bnei Sakhnin		
Hapoel Be'er Sheva	2–5	
Hapoel Haifa		
Hapoel Jerusalem		4–1
Hapoel Petah Tikva	2–1	
Hapoel Ramat Gan	2–1	
Hapoel Tel Aviv		1–2
Ironi Kiryat Shmona		4-0
Ironi Tiberias	3–2	
Maccabi Netanya	0–4	
Maccabi Petah Tikva		2–1
Maccabi Tel Aviv		1–3

==== Results summary ====
Overall								Home						Away					
Pld	W	D	L	GF	GA	GD	Pts	W	D	L	GF	GA	GD	W	D	L	GF	GA	GD
10	6	0	4	21	20	+1	18	3	0	2	9	13	−4	3	0	2	12	7	+5

Last updated: 8 November 2026.
Source: Competitive matches

==== Results by round ====
Round	1	2	3	4	5	6	7	8	9	10	11	12	13	14	15	16	17	18	19	20	21	22	23	24	25	26
Ground	H	A	H	A	H	A	A	H	A	H	A	H	A	A	H	A	H	A	H	H	A	H	A	H	A	H
Result	W	L	W	W	W	W	W	L	L	L																
Position	3	8	4	2	2	2	1	4	4	5																

Source: Competitive Matches
A = Away; H = Home; W = Win; D = Draw; L = Loss

== State Cup ==
=== Round of 32 ===
26 December 2026 Round of 32	Maccabi Haifa	v	Hapoel Ra'anana	Haifa
17:30				Stadium: Sammy Ofer Stadium

== Toto Cup ==
=== Group stage ===
25 July 2026 1	Maccabi Haifa	2-3	Hapoel Haifa	Haifa
20:30	Glazer (yellow card) 32'; Azoulay (yellow card) 32', (goal) 79': Naor (yellow card) 56'; Khalaily 75'	Report	31', (yellow card) 32' Gonen; 33' (o.g.) Sztejfman; 57' Turgeman; (yellow card) 63' Kričak; (yellow card) 66' Župarić	Stadium: Sammy Ofer Stadium; Attendance: 22,143; Referee: Gal Leibovich

28 July 2026 2	Ironi Kiryat Shmona	3-0	Maccabi Haifa	Netanya
20:00	Gabay 7'; Sagna 23'; Sola (yellow card) 30'; Darwish (yellow card) 32'; Sheratzky 33'; Abdullazade (yellow card) 74'; Ljubisavljević (yellow card) 79'	Report	(yellow card) 38' Ehud; (yellow card) 64' Bruninho; (yellow card) 66' Azoulay	Stadium: Netanya Stadium; Referee: Aviad Shiloach

4 August 2026 4	Maccabi Haifa	4-2	Ironi Tiberias	Haifa
20:00	Bruninho 18'; Chen 34' (o.g.); Lonwijk (yellow card) 36'; Levi (yellow card) 39'; Azoulay 44'; Kani 86'	Report	(yellow card) 26' Shahar; 45', 58' Ghanem	Stadium: Sammy Ofer Stadium; Attendance: 6,348; Referee: David Foxman

8 August 2026 5	Bnei Sakhnin	0-1	Maccabi Haifa	Sakhnin
20:30	Taha (yellow card) 14'		55' Kani; (yellow card) 45' Saief; (yellow card) 72' Lonwijk; (yellow card) 75' Gorré	Stadium: Doha Stadium; Referee: Yoni Klez

=== Classification play-offs ===
17 August 2026 9–10th classification match	Maccabi Haifa	0-1	Hapoel Jerusalem	Haifa
20:00	Tsunami (yellow card) 68'; Azoulay (yellow card) 75'; Mordechai (yellow card) 83'	Report	(yellow card) 40' Malmoud; (yellow card) 42' Almagor; 61' Dappa	Stadium: Sammy Ofer Stadium; Attendance: 5,142; Referee: Dekel Zino

== Statistics ==
=== Squad statistics ===
				Ligat HaAl		State Cup		Toto Cup		Total	
Nation	No.	Pos.	Name	App.	Goals.	App.	Goals.	App.	Goals.	App.	Goals.
(Israel)	1	GK	Omer Nir'on	0	0	0	0	0	0	0	0
(Israel)	2	RB	Eli Dasa	4	0	0	0	0	0	4	0
(Israel)	3	CB	Sean Goldberg	0	0	0	0	4	0	4	0
(Niger)	4	DM	Ali Mohamed	10	0	0	0	2	0	12	0
(Israel)	7	LW	Yair Mordechai	5	0	0	0	4	0	9	0
(Israel)	8	CM	Yarin Levi	9	0	0	0	4	0	13	0
(United States)	9	CF	Andrija Novakovich	10	4	0	0	0	0	10	4
(Brazil)	10	AM	Bruninho	10	4	0	0	5	1	15	5
(Curaçao)	11	LW	Kenji Gorré	9	2	0	0	5	0	14	2
(United States)	16	LM	Kenny Saief	9	0	0	0	3	0	12	0
(Israel)	17	LB	Yinon Fainegezict	0	0	0	0	0	0	0	0
(Israel)	18	CF	Guy Melamed	3	1	0	0	3	0	6	1
(Israel)	19	DM	Ethan Azoulay	9	3	0	0	5	2	14	5
(Suriname)	21	CB	Nigel Lonwijk	10	0	0	0	4	0	14	0
(Israel)	22	RB	Zohar Zasano	0	0	0	0	1	0	1	0
(Belgium)	25	RB	Jelle Bataille	9	0	0	0	4	0	13	0
(Togo)	26	RW	Silva Kani	4	0	0	0	3	2	7	2
(France)	27	LB	Pierre Cornud	0	0	0	0	0	0	0	0
(Israel)	29	LW	Eyad Khlaily	9	0	0	0	5	1	14	1
(Portugal)	30	RW	Pedro Brazão	7	2	0	0	0	0	7	2
(Israel)	31	DM	Amit Arazi	0	0	0	0	0	0	0	0
(Israel)	35	CB	Noam Sztejfman	7	2	0	0	3	0	10	2
(Israel)	36	DM	Nevot Ratner	3	0	0	0	2	0	5	0
(Israel)	37	CB	Elad Amir	0	0	0	0	0	0	0	0
(Israel)	38	CF	Adam Grimberg	4	2	0	0	2	0	6	2
(Israel)	40	GK	Shareef Kayouf	0	0	0	0	0	0	0	0
(Israel)	42	CF	Liam Luski	0	0	0	0	0	0	0	0
(Brazil)	44	CB	Pedrão	3	0	0	0	3	0	6	0
(Ivory Coast)	45	CM	Cédric Don	4	0	0	0	4	0	8	0
(Israel)	55	GK	Omri Glazer	10	0	0	0	3	0	13	0
(Brazil)	66	CB	Wenderson Tsunami	8	1	0	0	4	0	12	1
(Israel)	90	GK	Glenn Alvin	0	0	0	0	3	0	3	0
Players who have made an appearance this season but have left the club
(Israel)	5	DM	Goni Naor	0	0	0	0	1	0	1	0
(Angola)	14	RW	Manuel Benson	0	0	0	0	2	0	2	0
(Israel)	32	DM	Itay Ehud	0	0	0	0	1	0	1	0

=== Goals ===
Rank	Position	Player	Ligat HaAl	State Cup	Toto Cup	Total
1	DM	(Israel) Ethan Azoulay	3	0	2	5
1	AM	(Brazil) Bruninho	4	0	1	5
3	CF	(United States) Andrija Novakovich	4	0	0	4
4	RW	(Israel) Silva Kani	0	0	2	2
4	RW	(Portugal) Pedro Brazão	1	0	0	2
4	LW	(Curaçao) Kenji Gorré	1	0	0	2
4	CB	(Israel) Noam Sztejfman	2	0	0	2
4	CF	(Israel) Adam Grimberg	2	0	0	2
9	LW	(Israel) Eyad Khlaily	0	0	1	1
9	CB	(Brazil) Wenderson Tsunami	1	0	0	1
9	CF	(Israel) Guy Melamed	1	0	0	1

=== Assist ===
Rank	Position	Player	Ligat HaAl	State Cup	Toto Cup	Total
1	AM	(Brazil) Bruninho	5	0	0	5
2	RW	(Portugal) Pedro Brazão	3	0	0	3
3	LW	(Curaçao) Kenji Gorré	0	0	2	2
3	RW	(Israel) Silva Kani	2	0	0	2
3	CB	(Suriname) Nigel Lonwijk	2	0	0	2
6	CB	(Israel) Sean Goldberg	0	0	1	1
6	LW	(Israel) Eyad Khlaily	0	0	1	1
6	CF	(United States) Andrija Novakovich	1	0	0	1
6	LM	(United States) Kenny Saief	1	0	0	1
6	RB	(Israel) Eli Dasa	1	0	0	1

=== Clean sheets ===
Rank	Pos.	No.	Name	Ligat HaAl	State Cup	Toto Cup	Total
1	GK	90	(Israel) Glenn Alvin	0	0	1	1
1	GK	55	(Israel) Omri Glazer	1	0	0	1

=== Disciplinary record for Ligat Ha'Al and State Cup ===
No.	Pos	Nat	Name	Ligat HaAl			State Cup			Total		
No.	Pos	Nat	Name	Yellow card	(yellow card) (yellow-red card)	Red card	Yellow card	(yellow card) (yellow-red card)	Red card	Yellow card	(yellow card) (yellow-red card)	Red card
19	DM	(Israel)	Ethan Azoulay	5						5		
30	RW	(Portugal)	Pedro Brazão	4						4		
25	RB	(Belgium)	Jelle Bataille	3						3		
9	CF	(United States)	Andrija Novakovich	3						3		
44	CB	(Brazil)	Pedrão	2						2		
7	LW	(Israel)	Yair Mordechai	2						2		
21	CB	(Suriname)	Nigel Lonwijk	2						2		
16	LM	(United States)	Kenny Saief	2						2		
36	DM	(Israel)	Nevot Ratner	2						2		
66	LB	(Brazil)	Wenderson Tsunami	1						1		
4	DM	(Niger)	Ali Mohamed	1						1		
10	AM	(Brazil)	Bruninho	1						1		
35	CB	(Israel)	Noam Sztejfman			1						1
2	RB	(Israel)	Eli Dasa	1						1		

=== Suspensions ===
Player	Date Received	Offence	Length of suspension		
(Israel) Noam Sztejfman	26 October 2026	(red card) 55' vs Hapoel Be'er Sheva (H)	1 Matches	Hapoel Tel Aviv (A)	2 November 2026
(Israel) Ethan Azoulay	2 November 2026	(yellow card) 60' vs Hapoel Tel Aviv (A)	1 Matches	Maccabi Netanya (H)	7 November 2026

=== Penalties ===
Date	Penalty Taker	Scored	Opponent	Competition
22 August 2026	(Israel) Ethan Azoulay	No	Hapoel Ramat Gan	Ligat Ha`Al
31 August 2026	(Israel) Ethan Azoulay	Yes	Maccabi Tel Aviv	Ligat Ha`Al
20 September 2026	(Curaçao) Kenji Gorré	Yes	Ironi Tiberias	Ligat Ha`Al
26 October 2026	(Israel) Bruninho	No	Hapoel Be'er Sheva	Ligat Ha`Al

=== Overall ===
	Total	Home	Away
Games played	15	8	7
Games won	8	4	4
Games drawn			
Games lost	7	4	3
Biggest win	4-0 vs Ironi Kiryat Shmona	4-2 vs Ironi Tiberias	4-0 vs Ironi Kiryat Shmona
Biggest loss	0-4 vs Maccabi Netanya	0-4 vs Maccabi Netanya	0-3 vs Ironi Kiryat Shmona
Biggest win (League)	4-0 vs Ironi Kiryat Shmona	2-1 vs Hapoel Ramat Gan; 2-1 vs Hapoel Petah Tikva; 3-2 vs Ironi Tiberias	4-0 vs Ironi Kiryat Shmona
Biggest loss (League)	0-4 vs Maccabi Netanya	0-4 vs Maccabi Netanya	1-3 vs Maccabi Tel Aviv
Biggest win (Cup)			
Biggest loss (Cup)			
Biggest win (Toto)	4-2 vs Ironi Tiberias	4-2 vs Ironi Tiberias	1-0 vs Bnei Sakhnin
Biggest loss (Toto)	0-3 vs Ironi Kiryat Shmona	2-3 vs Hapoel Haifa; 0-1 vs Hapoel Jerusalem	0-3 vs Ironi Kiryat Shmona
Goals scored	28	15	13
Goals conceded	29	19	10
Goal difference	-1	-4	+3
Average GF per game	1.87	1.88	1.86
Average GA per game	1.93	2.38	1.43
Clean sheets	2		2
Yellow cards	43	21	22
Red cards	1	1	
Most appearances	(Brazil) Bruninho (15)		
Most goals	(Brazil) Bruninho (Israel) Ethan Azoulay (5)		
Most Assist	(Brazil) Bruninho (5)		
Penalties for	4	3	1
Penalties scored	2	1	1
Penalties against	4	3	1
Penalties saved	1	1	0
