= 2026–27 Israeli Premier League =

Israeli Premier League
- Season: 2026–27
- Dates: 22 August 2026 – 22 May 2027
- Matches: 70
- Goals: 210 (3 per match)
- Top goalscorer: Dor Peretz (10)
- Biggest home win: Hapoel Tel Aviv 4–0 Hapoel Ramat Gan (7 September 2026); Maccabi Tel Aviv 6- 2 Hapoel Haifa (24 October 2026)
- Biggest away win: Hapoel Ramat Gan 0–5 Maccabi Tel Aviv (2 November 2026)
- Highest scoring: 8 - Maccabi Tel Aviv 6- 2 Hapoel Haifa (24 October 2026)
- Longest winning run: Hapoel Be'er Sheva (6)
- Longest unbeaten run: Maccabi Tel Aviv (10)
- Longest winless run: Hapoel Petah Tikva (7)
- Longest losing run: Hapoel Petah Tikva (7)
- Highest attendance: 29,443 (Maccabi Haifa vs Hapoel Be'er Sheva) (26 October 2026)
- Average attendance: 10,283
- All statistics correct as of 3 November 2026.

The 2026–27 Israeli Premier League (also known as Ligat TOTO Winner for sponsorship reasons) is the 28th season since the introduction of the Israeli Premier League in 1999 and the 85th season of top-tier football in Israel.

== Teams ==
The league consists of fourteen teams; twelve sides from the previous season and two promoted teams from the 2025–26 Liga Leumit; Maccabi Petah Tikva and Hapoel Ramat Gan Givatayim. Maccabi Petah Tikva return after a single season meanwhile Hapoel Ramat Gan after 13 years. They replaced the 2024–25 Israeli Premier League bottom two teams, Maccabi Bnei Reineh and F.C. Ashdod who were relegated to the 2026–27 Liga Leumit.

Locations of the 2025–26 Israeli Premier League teams

=== Stadiums and locations ===
Team	Location	Stadium	Capacity
Beitar Jerusalem	Jerusalem	Teddy Stadium	31,733
Bnei Sakhnin	Sakhnin	Doha Stadium	8,500
Hapoel Be'er Sheva	Be'er Sheva	Turner Stadium	16,126
Hapoel Haifa	Haifa	Sammy Ofer Stadium	30,950
Hapoel Jerusalem	Jerusalem	Teddy Stadium	31,733
Hapoel Petah Tikva	Petah Tikva	HaMoshava Stadium	11,500
Hapoel Ramat Gan	Ramat Gan	Rehovot Stadium	6,000
Hapoel Tel Aviv	Tel Aviv	Bloomfield Stadium	29,400
Ironi Kiryat Shmona	Kiryat Shmona	Netanya Stadium	13,610
Ironi Tiberias	Tiberias	Barel Stadium	5,200
Maccabi Haifa	Haifa	Sammy Ofer Stadium	30,950
Maccabi Netanya	Netanya	Miriam Stadium	13,610
Maccabi Petah Tikva	Petah Tikva	HaMoshava Stadium	11,500
Maccabi Tel Aviv	Tel Aviv	Bloomfield Stadium	29,400

Beitar Jerusalem Hapoel Jerusalem	Hapoel Haifa Maccabi Haifa	Hapoel Tel Aviv Maccabi Tel Aviv
Teddy Stadium, Jerusalem	Sammy Ofer Stadium, Haifa	Bloomfield Stadium, Tel Aviv
Maccabi Netanya Ironi Kiryat Shmona	Hapoel Petah Tikva Maccabi Petah Tikva	Bnei Sakhnin
Miriam Stadium, Netanya	HaMoshava Stadium, Petah Tikva	Doha Stadium, Sakhnin
Hapoel Be'er Sheva	Ironi Tiberias	Hapoel Ramat Gan
Turner Stadium, Be'er Sheva	Barel Stadium, Nof HaGalil	Rehovot Stadium, Rehovot

=== Personnel and sponsorship ===
Team	President	Manager	Captain	Kitmaker	Shirt sponsor
Beitar Jerusalem	(Israel) Barak Abramov	(Israel) Almog Cohen	(Israel) Yarden Shua	——	Geshem Holdings
Bnei Sakhnin	(Israel) Khaled Dokhi	(Israel) Yossi Abukasis	(Israel) Maroun Gantous	Jako	Jenno
Hapoel Be'er Sheva	(Israel) Alona Barkat	(Israel) Ran Kojok	(Israel) Miguel Vítor	Umbro	Victory
Hapoel Haifa	(Israel) Yoav Katz	(Israel) Haim Silvas	(Israel) Dor Malul	Reebok	Ahuza
Hapoel Jerusalem	(Israel) Yotam Karmon	(Israel) Lior Zada	(Israel) Omer Agvadish	Legea	Allon Ventures
Hapoel Petah Tikva	(Israel) Almog Portman	(Israel) Omer Peretz	(Israel) Omer Katz	Lotto	Mivne Group
Hapoel Ramat Gan	(Israel) Avi Yehiel	(Israel) Messay Dego	(Israel) Dudu Twito	Umbro	Maoz Daniel
Hapoel Tel Aviv	(Brazil) Edmond M. Safra	(Israel) Elyaniv Barda	(Republic of the Congo) Fernand Mayembo	Nike	IBI Investment
Ironi Kiryat Shmona	(Israel) Izzy Sheratzky	(Israel) Shay Barda	(Israel) Ariel Sheratzky	Reebok	Ituran
Ironi Tiberias	(Israel) Arie Kalmanzon	(Israel) Alon Ziv (caretaker)	(Czech Republic) Ondřej Bačo	Reebok	Masada Armour
Maccabi Haifa	(Israel) Ya'akov Shahar	(Israel) Ran Ben-Shimon	(Curaçao) Kenji Gorré	Adidas	Volvo
Maccabi Netanya	(United States) Ross Kestin	(Israel) Ronny Levy	(Israel) Karem Jaber	Lotto	Remilk
Maccabi Petah Tikva	(Israel) Avraham Luzon	(Israel) Ziv Arie	(Israel) Mohammed Hindy	Umbro	Panorama North
Maccabi Tel Aviv	(Canada) Mitchell Goldhar	(Scotland) Kenny Miller	(Israel) Dor Peretz	Puma	Pelephone

==== Managerial changes ====
Team	Outgoing manager	Manner of departure	Date of vacancy	Position in table	Incoming manager	Date of appointment	Ref.
Maccabi Petah Tikva	(Israel) Noam Shoham	End of Contract	27 May 2026	Pre-Season	(Israel) Ziv Arie	27 May 2026	
Beitar Jerusalem	(Israel) Barak Yitzhaki	End of Contract	31 May 2026	Pre-Season	(Israel) Almog Cohen	31 May 2026	
Ironi Tiberias	(Israel) Eliran Hudeda	Suspended	5 July 2026	Pre-Season	(Israel) Alon Ziv & (Israel) Moti Krispil (caretaker)	17 August 2026	
Maccabi Haifa	(Israel) Barak Bakhar	Resigned	7 November 2026	5th	(Israel) Ran Ben-Shimon	20 November 2026	

=== Foreign players ===
The number of foreign players were restricted to eight per team.
In bold: Players that have been capped for their national team.

Club	Player 1	Player 2	Player 3	Player 4	Player 5	Player 6	Player 7	Player 8	Non-visa player
Beitar Jerusalem	(Ghana) Eugene Ansah	(Ghana) Nana Antwi	(Colombia) Brayan Carabalí	(Cameroon) Boris Enow	(Georgia (country)) **Luka Gadrani**	(Nigeria) Johnbosco Kalu	(Colombia) Alexis Serna	(Portugal) Miguel Silva	
Bnei Sakhnin	(Romania) Raul Bălbărău	(Guadeloupe) Dimitri Cavaré	(Ghana) Mathew Cudjoe	(Guinea-Bissau) Saná Gomes	(Netherlands) Leeroy Owusu	(Romania) Daniel Paraschiv	(Romania) Antonio Sefer	(Lithuania) Modestas Vorobjovas	
Hapoel Be'er Sheva	(Portugal) Pedro Amador	(Senegal) Djibril Diop	(Jamaica) Javon East	(Brazil) Lucas Ventura	(Brazil) João Victor	(Serbia) Igor Zlatanović	(Peru) **Adrián Ugarriza**		(Bulgaria) Yoni Stoyanov (Argentina) Marco Wolff
Hapoel Haifa	(Nigeria) William Agada	(Mali) Cheickna Diakité	(Mali) Cheick Keita	(Serbia) Ivan Kričak	(Senegal) Arial Mendy	(Croatia) Dario Župarić			
Hapoel Jerusalem	(Nigeria) Sani Abdulsalam	(Zambia) Edward Chilufya	(Moldova) **Vitalie Damașcan**	(Nigeria) Andrew Idoko	(Ghana) Zuberu Sharani	(Ivory Coast) Christ Tiéhi			(United States) Guy Bar
Hapoel Petah Tikva	(Ivory Coast) Boni Amian	(Bolivia) **Diego Arroyo**	(Ivory Coast) Yves Erick Bile	(Ghana) Edmond Asante	(Cape Verde) Clé	(Gabon) Alex Moucketou-Moussounda	(Democratic Republic of the Congo) Karim Kimvuidi	(France) Hamidou Keyta	
Hapoel Ramat Gan	(Nigeria) Christopher Boniface	(Brazil) Luan Campos	(Ghana) Fard Ibrahim	(Portugal) Jota	(Serbia) Srđan Mijailović	(Cameroon) Marius Noubissi	(Brazil) Márcio Silva		
Hapoel Tel Aviv	(Ghana) Emmanuel Boateng	(Brazil) Chico	(Guadeloupe) Marcus Coco	(Brazil) Falcão	(Bulgaria) **Andrian Kraev**	(Suriname) Yannick Leliendal	(Republic of the Congo) Fernand Mayembo	(Ghana) Douglas Owusu	(Denmark) Ben Sørensen
Ironi Kiryat Shmona	(Azerbaijan) Rufat Abdullazade	(Brazil) Talles Costa	(Serbia) Nemanja Ljubisavljević	(Romania) Alexandru Pop	(Senegal) Amadou Sagna	(Angola) Alex Sola			(Serbia) Nikola Đurković (Brazil) Daniel Tenenbaum
Ironi Tiberias	(Czech Republic) Ondřej Bačo	(The Gambia) Mansour Badjie	(Ivory Coast) Chriso	(Ivory Coast) Néné Gbamblé	(Armenia) **Artur Miranyan**	(Guinea-Bissau) Sambinha			(Ukraine) Daniel Joulani
Maccabi Haifa	(Belgium) Jelle Bataille	(Portugal) Pedro Brazão	(Brazil) Bruninho	(Ivory Coast) Cédric Don	(Suriname) Nigel Lonwijk	(United States) Andrija Novakovich	(Brazil) Pedrão	(Brazil) Wenderson Tsunami	(France) Pierre Cornud (Curaçao) **Kenji Gorré** (Niger) **Ali Mohamed** (United States) Kenny Saief
Maccabi Netanya (Note: Saba Khvadagiani as Suspended registration)	(France) Wylan Cyprien	(Brazil) Isaac	(Brazil) Matheus Davó	(Mali) Bakary Konaté	(Ivory Coast) Aziz Ouattara	(Portugal) Samu	(Romania) Gabriel Simion	(Benin) Olivier Verdon	(Russia) Grigori Morozov
Maccabi Petah Tikva	(Colombia) José Cortés	(Cyprus) Pavlos Korrea	(Ghana) Samuel Owusu	(Montenegro) Marko Rakonjac	(Guinea) Ibrahima Soumah	(England) Kyle Spence			
Maccabi Tel Aviv	(Netherlands) Tyrese Asante	(Serbia) Kristijan Belić	(Guinea) Mohamed Ali Camara	(Moldova) Ion Nicolaescu	(Mali) Issouf Sissokho	(Slovenia) **Ester Sokler**	(England) James Tavernier	(Cape Verde) **Hélio Varela**	

== Regular season ==
=== Regular season table ===
Pos	Team	Pld	W	D	L	GF	GA	GD	Pts	Qualification
1	Hapoel Tel Aviv	10	8	1	1	21	6	+15	25	Qualification for the Championship round
2	Maccabi Tel Aviv	10	7	3	0	31	10	+21	24	Qualification for the Championship round
3	Hapoel Be'er Sheva	10	7	1	2	22	13	+9	22	Qualification for the Championship round
4	Beitar Jerusalem	10	5	3	2	14	11	+3	18	Qualification for the Championship round
5	Maccabi Haifa	10	6	0	4	21	20	+1	18	Qualification for the Championship round
6	Maccabi Netanya	10	4	4	2	16	8	+8	16	Qualification for the Championship round
7	Bnei Sakhnin	10	3	4	3	8	8	0	13	Qualification for the Relegation round
8	Hapoel Haifa	10	3	3	4	13	18	−5	12	Qualification for the Relegation round
9	Maccabi Petah Tikva	10	3	1	6	16	23	−7	10	Qualification for the Relegation round
10	Hapoel Jerusalem	10	2	3	5	16	23	−7	9	Qualification for the Relegation round
11	Ironi Kiryat Shmona	10	2	1	7	9	17	−8	7	Qualification for the Relegation round
12	Hapoel Petah Tikva	10	2	0	8	5	17	−12	6	Qualification for the Relegation round
13	Hapoel Ramat Gan	10	2	0	8	8	22	−14	6	Qualification for the Relegation round
14	Ironi Tiberias	10	2	4	4	10	14	−4	1 (Note: Ironi Tiberias had 6 points deducted As a result of the dual contracts scandal from the previous season, Ironi Tiberias were deducted eight points from the 2025–26 season and a further six points from the current 2026–27 season.)	Qualification for the Relegation round

Updated to match(es) played on 8 November 2026. Source:
Rules for classification: 1) Points; 2) Goal difference; 3) Matches won; 4) Goals scored; 5) Head-to-head points; 6) Head-to-head goal difference; 7) Head-to-head goals scored; 8) Play-off.

=== Regular season results ===
Home \ Away	BEI	BnS	HBS	HHA	HJE	HPT	HRG	HTA	IKS	ITI	MHA	MNE	MPT	MTA
Beitar Jerusalem	—		6 Dec	2–1	28 Nov			14 Dec	1–1			1–4	3–1	0–0
Bnei Sakhnin	0–1	—				2–0	1–0	7 Dec		1–1	28 Nov	12 Dec	1–2	
Hapoel Be'er Sheva		3 Dec	—	2–2	2–1		20 Dec	0–1	1–0					1–4
Hapoel Haifa		3–1	14 Dec	—		2–1	0–2	0–0		28 Nov	5 Dec		2–1	
Hapoel Jerusalem		1–1		1 Dec	—	18 Dec		0–3	4–2		1–4			2–5
Hapoel Petah Tikva	0–1		0–2		1–0	—	2–1			11 Dec		1–1		
Hapoel Ramat Gan	0–4		1–2		5 Dec		—		28 Nov		12 Dec	2–0	1–2	0–5
Hapoel Tel Aviv	3–0			19 Dec		3–0	4–0	—	5 Dec	1–0	2–1	3 Dec		
Ironi Kiryat Shmona		0–1		2–0				1–3	—	2–0	0–4		12 Dec	1 Dec
Ironi Tiberias	1–1		0–2		2–2	1–0	1 Dec		19 Dec	—		1–1		
Maccabi Haifa	2 Dec		2–5			2–1	2–1			3–2	—	0–4		21 Dec
Maccabi Netanya	19 Dec	0–0	30 Nov	1–1	1–1				1–0			—	7 Dec	1–2
Maccabi Petah Tikva		19 Dec	2–5		2–4	1 Dec		27 Nov	2–1	1–2	1–2		—	
Maccabi Tel Aviv		0–0		6–2	12 Dec	28 Nov		4–1		5 Dec	3–1		2–2	—

Updated to match(es) played on 8 November 2026. Source: "Ligat Ha'Al – Matches".
Legend: Blue = home team win; Yellow = draw; Red = away team win.

=== Top scorers ===
Rank	Player	Club	Goals
1	(Israel) Dor Peretz	Maccabi Tel Aviv	10
2	(Serbia) Igor Zlatanović	Hapoel Be'er Sheva	5
2	(Israel) Alon Turgeman	Hapoel Haifa	5
2	(Nigeria) Andrew Idoko	Hapoel Jerusalem	5
2	(Brazil) Matheus Davó	Maccabi Netanya	5
2	(Israel) Nadim Warsana	Hapoel Jerusalem	5
7	(United States) Andrija Novakovich	Maccabi Haifa	4
7	(Slovenia) Ester Sokler	Maccabi Tel Aviv	4
7	(Brazil) Bruninho	Maccabi Haifa	4
7	(Colombia) José Cortés	Maccabi Petah Tikva	4
11	(Israel) Ethan Azoulay	Maccabi Haifa	3
11	(Israel) Elad Madmon	Maccabi Tel Aviv	3
11	(Senegal) Amadou Sagna	Ironi Kiryat Shmona	3
11	(Ghana) Douglas Owusu	Hapeol Tel Aviv	3
11	(Israel) Daniel Dappa	Hapeol Tel Aviv	3
11	(Ghana) Eugene Ansah	Beitar Jerusalem	3
11	(Brazil) Luan Campos	Hapoel Ramat Gan	3
11	(Israel) Liran Hazan	Maccabi Petah Tikva	3
11	(Israel) Omer Atzili	Beitar Jerusalem	3
11	(Israel) Omri Altman	Hapeol Tel Aviv	3
11	(Ghana) Emmanuel Boateng	Hapeol Tel Aviv	3
11	(Israel) Qays Ghanem	Ironi Tiberias	3
