= Itay Hazut =

Israeli association footballer (born 2004)

Personal information
- Full name: Itay Hazut
- Date of birth: 20 September 2006 (age 20)
- Place of birth: Be'er Sheva, Israel
- Height: 1.70 m (5 ft 7 in)
- Position: Attacking midfielder

Team information
- Current team: FC Ashdod (on loan from Hapoel Be'er Sheva)
- Number: 16

Youth career
- 2016–2017: FC Be'er Sheva
- 2017–2023: Hapoel Be'er Sheva

Senior career*
Years	Team	Apps	(Gls)
2023–	Hapoel Be'er Sheva	8	(1)
2026–	→ FC Ashdod (loan)	8	(1)
- * Club domestic league appearances and goals as of 15:51, 17 November 2026 (UTC)

Itay Hazut (Hebrew: איתי חזות; born 20 September 2006) is an Israeli professional footballer who plays as an attacking midfielder for Liga Leumit club FC Ashdod, on loan from Israeli Premier League club Hapoel Be'er Sheva.

== Early life ==
Hazut was born and raised in Be'er Sheva, Israel, to an Israeli family of both Sephardi Jewish and Mizrahi Jewish descent. His father, Gadi Hazut, was a product of Hapoel Be'er Sheva youth academy and spent many years playing for the club as a right back. He was also part of the team that won the club's first Israel State Cup in the 1996–97 season.

== Club career ==
=== Hapoel Be'er Sheva ===
Hazut developed in the youth department of FC Be'er Sheva and Hapoel Be'er Sheva, which he joined during the 2017–18 season. During his time in the academy, he represented the club at various youth levels. He was also part of the inaugural class of Hapoel Be'er Sheva football academy at the Eshel HaNasi Youth village, where he combined his studies with football training.

During the 2022–23 season, Hazut progressed to Hapoel Be'er Sheva under-17 team, while also beginning to train with the club's under-19 side. Towards the end of the season, he was called up to the senior squad by head coach Elyaniv Barda. On 20 May 2023, at the age of 16, Hazut made his senior debut, coming on as a late substitute in a 2–0 victory over Maccabi Netanya in the final round of the Israeli Premier League championship play-offs. It was his only senior appearance of the 2022–23 season.

On 6 July 2025, Hazut signed a five-year contract with Hapoel Be'er Sheva, keeping him at the club until the end of the 2029–30 season. The agreement marked his transition from the club's youth setup to the senior squad. During the 2025–26 season, Hazut became more regularly involved with Hapoel Be'er Sheva senior squad. On the second matchday of the Israeli Premier League season, he came on as a substitute in a 7–0 victory over Ironi Tiberias. In the 83rd minute, Hazut delivered a cross into the penalty area which Igor Zlatanović headed into the net, giving Hazut his first senior assist. At the time, the result represented the largest league victory in Hapoel Be'er Sheva history. Hazut continued to make substitute appearances throughout the season. On 23 May 2026, in the final league match of the season against Maccabi Haifa, he was given significant playing time in a league match for the first time. In the 43rd minute, after Hapoel Be'er Sheva were awarded a penalty, Hazut converted the spot kick to score his first senior goal. He was later involved in the build-up to his team's second goal in a match that ended in a 5–2 defeat. Hazut made six league appearances during the season, scoring two goal and providing one assist. At the end of the campaign, he won the Israeli Premier League title with Hapoel Be'er Sheva, the first senior champions of his career.

Hazut began the 2026–27 season as part of Hapoel Be'er Sheva senior squad. On 13 September 2026, he made his first league start for the club in a 2–0 victory over Hapoel Petah Tikva. He played the first half before being substituted at half-time.

=== Loan to FC Ashdod ===
On 15 September 2026, Hazut joined Liga Leumit club FC Ashdod on loan from Hapoel Be'er Sheva until the end of the 2026–27 season. On 17 September, Hazut made his debut for FC Ashdod, coming on as a second-half substitute in a league match against Hapoel Rishon LeZion. In the 84th minute, he assisted Ebenezer Mamatah for the equalising goal, before FC Ashdod completed a comeback to win 3–2. It was Hazut first assist for the club. On 24 September 2026, Hazut made his first start for FC Ashdod in an away league match against Ironi Modi'in. In the 42nd minute, he scored his first goal for the club to give FC Ashdod a 1–0 lead. He was substituted at half-time, as FC Ashdod went on to win the match 3–1.

== Career statistics ==
=== Club ===
As of 17 November 2026

Appearances and goals by club, season and competition
Club	Season	League			National cup		League cup (Note: Includes the Israel Super Cup or Israel Toto Cup (Israeli Premier League))		Continental (Europe)		Other		Total	
Club	Season	Division	Apps	Goals	Apps	Goals	Apps	Goals	Apps	Goals	Apps	Goals	Apps	Goals
Hapoel Be'er Sheva	2022–23	Israeli Premier League	1	0	0	0	0	0	–	–	0	0	1	0
Hapoel Be'er Sheva	2023–24	Israeli Premier League	0	0	0	0	0	0	–	–	0	0	0	0
Hapoel Be'er Sheva	2024–25	Israeli Premier League	0	0	0	0	0	0	–	–	0	0	0	0
Hapoel Be'er Sheva	2025–26	Israeli Premier League	6	1	2	0	0	0	0	0	0	0	8	1
Hapoel Be'er Sheva	2026–27	Israeli Premier League	1	0	0	0	1	0	0	0	0	0	2	0
Hapoel Be'er Sheva	Total		8	1	2	0	1	0	0	0	0	0	11	1
FC Ashdod (on loan from Hapoel Be'er Sheva)	2026–27	Liga Leumit	8	1	0	0	0	0	–	–	0	0	8	1
FC Ashdod (on loan from Hapoel Be'er Sheva)	Total		8	1	0	0	0	0	0	0	0	0	8	1
Career total			16	2	2	0	1	0	0	0	0	0	19	2

== Honours ==
Hapoel Beer Sheva

- Israeli Premier League: 2025–26

== See also ==
- List of Jewish footballers
- List of Jews in sports
- List of Israelis
- List of Israel international footballers
