= 2026–27 Israel State Cup =

Tournament details
- Country: Israel
- Dates: 20 August 2026 – May 2027

Tournament statistics
- Matches played: 141
- Goals scored: 557 (3.95 per match)

The 2026–27 Israel State Cup (Hebrew: גביע המדינה, Gvia HaMedina) (known as the Gvia HaMedina Winner for sponsorship purposes) is the 88th season of Israel's nationwide Association football cup competition and the 72nd after the Israeli Declaration of Independence. The winners will qualify for the 2027–28 UEFA Europa League second qualifying round.

== Preliminary rounds ==
=== Liga Bet ===
The Winner and the Runners-up from each regional divisions will qualified to the sixth round.

==== Liga Bet North A ====
First Round
28 September 2026
F.C. Shefa-Amr	6
Bnei Maghar	0

Second Round
29 September 2026
Hapoel Kaukab	2
Maccabi Ihud Bnei Ibtin	1
1 September 2026
F.C. Shefa-Amr	5
Maccabi Abu Snan	1
29 August 2026
F.C. Bnei M.M.B.E.	3
Maccabi Ahva Sha'ab	1
31 August 2026
F.C. Hapeol Yarka	4
Hapoel Ihud Bnei Sumei	0

Third Round
10 September 2026
Hapoel Kaukab	0
F.C. Shefa-Amr	3
10 September 2026
F.C. Bnei M.M.B.E.	0 (3)
F.C. Hapeol Yarka	0 (4)

Fourth Round
15 September 2026
F.C. Shefa-Amr	1 (4)
F.C. Hapeol Yarka (p)	1 (5)

F.C. Hapeol Yarka and F.C. Shefa-Amr qualified to the sixth round.

==== Liga Bet North B ====
First Round
28 August 2026
F.C. Or Akiva	4
F.C. Ironi Ariel	1
27 August 2026
Maccabi Ironi Kfer Yona	2
F.C. Kababir	0
28 August 2026
Hapoel Ramot Menashe Megiddo	0
Hapoel Giv'at Olga	1
27 August 2026
F.C. Tzofi Haifa Robi	0
Maccabi Isfiya	7
28 August 2026
Beitar Haifa (p)	1 (3)
Hapoel Bnei Ar'ara 'Ara	1 (1)
28 August 2026
Hapoel Daliyat al-Karmel	4
F.C. Tzeirei Haifa	1

Second Round
1 September 2026
F.C. Or Akiva	1
Maccabi Ironi Kfer Yona	2
~~Hapoel Giv'at Olga~~
~~Maccabi Isfiya~~
1 September 2026
F.C. Netanya Kolat Cohen	1
Ihud Bnei Baqa	0
1 September 2026
Beitar Haifa	1
Hapoel Daliyat al-Karmel	2

Third Round
Maccabi Ironi Kfer Yona	w/o
—
10 September 2026
F.C. Netanya Kolat Cohen	1
Hapoel Daliyat al-Karmel	6

Fourth Round
15 September 2026
Maccabi Ironi Kfer Yona	0
Hapoel Daliyat al-Karmel	2

Hapoel Daliyat al-Karmel and Maccabi Ironi Kfer Yona qualified to the sixth round.

==== Liga Bet South A ====
First Round
27 August 2026
Beitar Kfar Saba	1
Hapoel Hod HaSharon	3
27 August 2026
F.C. Kiryat Ono	1
Bnei Jaffa Ortodoxim	3
29 August 2026
Hakoah Amidar Ramat Gan	0
Bnei Jaljulia	2
27 August 2026
Ironi Beit Dagan	2
Beitar Tel Aviv Holon	1
28 August 2026
Bnei Yehud	1
Beitar Ramat Gan	0
27 August 2026
F.C. Hapoel Lod Beni Regev	4
Maccabi Ramat HaSharon	3

Second Round
Hapoel Hod HaSharon	0
Beitar Petah Tikva	2
1 September 2026
Bnei Jaffa Ortodoxim	5
Bnei Jaljulia	4
1 September 2026
Maccabi Ironi Amishav Petah Tikva	3
Ironi Beit Dagan	0
1 September 2026
Bnei Yehud	1
F.C. Hapoel Lod Beni Regev	0

Third Round
10 September 2026
Beitar Petah Tikva	4
Bnei Jaffa Ortodoxim	1
9 September 2026
Maccabi Ironi Amishav Petah Tikva	4 (2)
Bnei Yehud	4 (4)

Fourth Round
15 September 2026
Beitar Petah Tikva (p)	1 (4)
Bnei Yehud	1 (2)

Beitar Petah Tikva and Bnei Yehud qualified to the sixth round.

==== Liga Bet South B ====
First Round
27 August 2026
F.C. Shikun HaMizrah	5
Hapoel Bnei Ashdod	2
28 August 2026
F.C. Maccabi Ashkelon	2
Beitar Kiryat Gat	0
27 August 2026
Maccabi Ironi Netivot	2
Hapoel Ironi Ashkelon (a.e.t.)	3
Bnei Eilat	(w/o)
Sektzia Ness Ziona
27 August 2026
F.C. Hapeol Yeruham	0
Maccabi Be'er Sheva	1

Second Round
27 August 2026
F.C. Arad	3
F.C. Ramla	1
31 August 2026
F.C. Shikun HaMizrah	7
F.C. Maccabi Ashkelon	3
31 August 2026
Hapoel Segev Shalom	3
Hapoel Ironi Ashkelon	0
31 August 2026
Bnei Eilat (p)	5 (5)
Maccabi Be'er Sheva	5 (4)

Third Round
7 September 2026
F.C. Arad	1
F.C. Shikun HaMizrah	0
10 September 2026
Hapoel Segev Shalom	4
Bnei Eilat (a.e.t.)	5

Fourth Round
22 December 2026
F.C. Arad
Bnei Eilat

F.C. Arad and Bnei Eilat qualified to the sixth round.

=== Liga Gimel ===
Sources:

- Schedule:

The Winner from each regional divisions wiil qualified to the sixth round.

==== Liga Gimel Upper Galilee ====
Second Round
28 August 2026
Hapoel Bnei Peki'in	4
Hapoel Bnei Deir al-Asad	1

Third Round
10 September 2026
Sektzia Ma'alot-Tarshiha	5
Hapoel Bnei Peki'in	1

Sektzia Ma'alot-Tarshiha won the district cup and qualified to the sixth round.

==== Liga Gimel Bay ====
First Round
29 August 2026
F.C. Carmel Haifa	0
Hapoel Kiryat Haim Leibovich	1
26 August 2026
Hapoel Kafr Misr	17
Beitar Kiryat Ata Kfir	0

Second Round
4 September 2026
Hapoel Kiryat Haim Leibovich	1 (4)
Hapoel Kafr Misr	1 (2)
4 September 2026
F.C. Kiryat Haim	1
F.C. Kfar Kama	0

Third Round
10 September 2026
Hapoel Kiryat Haim Leibovich	0
F.C. Kiryat Haim	1

F.C. Kiryat Haim won the district cup and qualified to the sixth round.

==== Liga Gimel Jezreel ====
First Round
28 August 2026
Beitar Pardes Hanna	1
F.C. Ihud Qalansawe	6

Second Round
5 September 2026
Bnei Umm al-Fahm Hilal	1
Hapoel Ein as-Sahla	5
4 September 2026
Hapoel Bnei Jisr az-Zarqa	6
Maccabi Barkai	0
5 September 2026
Ahva Kafr Qara	3
F.C. Ihud Qalansawe	0
4 September 2026
Hapoel Mu'awiya	1 (5)
F.C. Pardes Hanna-Karkur Lior Boker	1 (6)

Third Round
10 September 2026
Hapoel Ein as-Sahla	0
Hapoel Bnei Jisr az-Zarqa	2
9 September 2026
Ahva Kafr Qara (a.e.t.)	2
F.C. Pardes Hanna-Karkur Lior Boker	1

Fourth Round
15 September 2026
Hapoel Bnei Jisr az-Zarqa	1
Ahva Mafr Qara	0

Hapoel Bnei Jisr az-Zarqa won the district cup and qualified to the sixth round.

==== Liga Gimel Samaria ====
Second Round
29 August 2026
Maccabi Tzeiri Qalansawe	0
Bnei Tira	1
29 August 2026
Beitar Nes Tubruk	4
Hapoel Oranit Ido Aguzi	5
30 August 2026
Hapoel Pardesiya Noam	1
F.C. Tayibe	2

Third Round
4 September 2026
Bnei Tira (a.e.t.)	5
Hapoel Oranit Ido Aguzi	3
4 August 2026
F.C. Tayibe	3
Maccabi HaSharon Netanya Victor Atia	0

Fourth Round
14 September 2026
Bnei Tira	1
F.C. Tayibe	2

F.C. Tayibe won the district cup and qualified to the sixth round.

==== Liga Gimel Dan ====
First Round
28 August 2026
Maccabi HaShikma Ramat Hen	4
Maccabi Yehud-Monosson	0
31 August 2026
Shikun Vatikim Ramat Gan	4
F.C. Bnei Tzion Petah Tikva	0
25 August 2026
F.C. Kiryat Ono	6
F.C. Bnei Ra'anana Uzi Cohen	1
28 August 2026
Maccabi Spartak Ramat Gan	1
Gissin Petah Tikva	4

Second Round
4 September 2026
Maccabi HaShikma Ramat Hen	0
Ironi Rosh HaAyin (a.e.t.)	4
4 September 2026
Maccabi Ironi Or Yehuda	0
Shikun Vatikim Ramat Gan	4
5 September 2026
F.C. Ironi Or Yehuda	1 (4)
Maccabi Giv'at Shmuel	1 (3)
1 September 2026
F.C. Kiryat Ono	0
Gissin Petah Tikva	2

Third Round
9 September 2026
Ironi Rosh HaAyin (a.e.t.)	4
Shikun Vatikim Ramat Gan	3
10 September 2026
F.C. Ironi Or Yehuda	1
Gissin Petah Tikva	2

Fourth Round
15 September 2026
Ironi Rosh HaAyin	1
Gissin Petah Tikva	5

Gissin Petah Tikva won the district cup and qualified to the sixth round.

==== Liga Gimel Center ====
Second Round
28 August 2026
F.C. Be'er Ya'akov Solomon	5
Bnei Ramla	1

Third Round
8 September 2026
F.C. Ashdod City	1
Beitar Mevaseret Zion Oz (Note: Original competes in Liga Bet South B, but since it registered for the league after the draw had taken place, it was entered into the State Cup draw for Liga Gimel clubs.)	4
4 September 2026
F.C. Be'er Ya'akov Solomon	6
Maccabi Gan Yavne	0

Fourth Round
6 October 2026
Beitar Mevaseret Zion Oz	2
F.C. Be'er Ya'akov Solomon	0

Beitar Mevaseret Zion Oz won the district cup and qualified to the sixth round.

==== Liga Gimel Tel Aviv ====
First Round
28 August 2026
Beitar Jaffa Tzion	0
Bnei Herzliya	18
30 August 2026
Maccabi Azor	5
Hapoel Neve Golan	0

Second Round
3 September 2026
Bnei Herzliya	4
Beitar Ezra	2
6 September 2026
F.C. Tel Aviv Tommy	0
Maccabi Azor	6
5 September 2026
Maccabi Ironi Bat Yam Miki Solomovich	1
F.C. Dizngoff Tel Aviv	4
7 September 2026
Hapoel Tzafririm Holon	3
Elitzur Jaffa Tel Aviv	1

Third Round
10 September 2026
Bnei Herzliya	3
Maccabi Azor	2
10 September 2026
F.C. Dizngoff Tel Aviv	4
Hapoel Tzafririm Holon	6

Fourth Round
15 September 2026
Bnei Herzliya	4
Hapoel Tzafririm Holon	1

Bnei Herzliya won the district cup and qualified to the sixth round.

==== Liga Gimel South ====
First Round
28 August 2026
Hapoel Rahat	3
F.C. Be'er Sheva	1

Second Round
4 September 2026
Hapoel Rahat	5
Otzma Be'er Sheva	0

Third Round
10 September 2026
Hapoel Rahat	4
Bnei Yerucham Almog Dadon	1

Hapoel Rahat won the district cup and qualified to the sixth round.

== Fifth round ==
Sources:

- Schedule:

The fifth round was played within each division of Liga Alef, split into two regions (Liga Alef North and Liga Alef South). Due to the expansion of the number of teams in each regional league, four teams from each division will enter the preliminary round. The two winners will then join the remaining 14 teams.

=== Liga Alef North ===
==== Liga Alef North — Preliminary ====
Home Team	Score	Away Team
Maccabi Neve Sha'anan Eldad	2–0	Hapoel Tirat HaCarmel
Hapoel Migdal HaEmek	3–0 (w/o)	—

==== Liga Alef North — Main ====
Home Team	Score	Away Team
Hapoel Bnei Musmus	3–3 (3–1 p)	Maccabi Ata Bialik
Maccabi Nujeidat	0–3	Hapoel Ironi Karmiel
Tzeirei Umm al-Fahm	3–1	Hapoel Ironi Baqa al-Gharbiyye
Ironi Nesher	5–1	Maccabi Neve Sha'anan Eldad
Tzeirei Tamra	0–6	Hapoel Nof HaGalil
Hapoel Beit She'an Massilot	2–3	F.C. Tira
Hapoel Umm al-Fahm	1–0	Hapoel Migdal HaEmek
Hapoel Ihud Bnei Jatt	1–5	Beitar Nahariya

=== Liga Alef South ===
==== Liga Alef South — Preliminary ====
Home Team	Score	Away Team
Hapoel Nir Ramat HaSharon	2–1 (a.e.t.)	Maccabi Ironi Ashdod
A.S. Nordia Jerusalem	0–1	Hapoel Hadera

==== Liga Alef South — Main ====
Home Team	Score	Away Team
F.C. Sderot	1–0	Shimshon Tel Aviv
Hapoel Nir Ramat HaSharon	3–2 (a.e.t.)	F.C. Jerusalem
Hapoel Azor	1–0 (a.e.t.)	Hapoel Mahane Yehuda
Hapoel Marmorek	1–3	Maccabi Yavne
Hapoel Hadera	1–3	F.C. Dimona
Maccabi Kiryat Malakhi	1–0	Holon Yermiyahu F.C.
F.C. Tzeirei Tira	0–1	F.C. Kfar Saba
Ironi Beit Shemesh	2–2 (1–3 p)	Hapoel Herzliya

== Sixth round ==
The 16 preliminary rounds winners (8 from Liga Bet and 8 from Liga Gimel), 16 fifth round winners (8 from each division) played in this round

Sources:

- Schedule:
- Results:

Home Team	Score	Away Team
12 October 2026
F.C. Hapeol Yarka (4)	0–1	Beitar Nahariya (3)
Hapoel Rahat (5)	1–4	F.C. Sderot (3)
Hapoel Nir Ramat HaSharon (3)	2–0	Bnei Eilat (4)
Ironi Nesher (3)	2–0	F.C. Kiryat Haim (5)
F.C. Dimona (3)	2–0	Bnei Yehud (4)
Hapoel Ironi Karmiel (3)	2–0	Maccabi Ironi Kfer Yona (4)
Maccabi Kiryat Malakhi (3)	2–1	Beitar Mevaseret Zion Oz (5)
Hapoel Herzliya (3)	0–1	Hapoel Azor (3)
Hapoel Nof HaGalil (3)	4–0	Hapoel Bnei Musmus (3)
F.C. Tira (3)	3–2	Maccabi Sektzia Ma'alot-Tarshiha (5)
Gissin Petah Tikva (5)	0–4	Beitar Petah Tikva (4)
Bnei Herzliya (5)	0–1 (a.e.t.)	Maccabi Yavne (3)
13 October 2026
Ihud Umm al-Fahm (3)	3–2	F.C. Shefa-Amr (4)
F.C. Arad (4)	0–3	F.C. Kfar Saba (3)
F.C. Tayibe (5)	2–4	Hapoel Daliyat al-Karmel (4)

== Seventh round ==
The 16 sixth round winners and 12 teams from the 2026–27 Liga Leumit entered the seventh round (Maccabi Bnei Reineh, Maccabi Herzliya, Maccabi Kiryat Gat and Hapoel Kfar Saba received byes to the next round)

Home Team	Score	Away Team
26 October 2026
F.C. Kafr Qasim (2)	5–2	Beitar Petah Tikva (4)
Hapoel Acre (2)	5–0	F.C. Tira (3)
Beitar Nahariya (3)	1–3	Hapoel Afula (2)
F.C. Dimona (3)	2–3	Hapoel Rishon LeZion (2)
F.C. Sderot (3)	2–3	Maccabi Akhi Nazareth (2)
28 October 2026
F.C. Kfar Saba (3)	0–2 (a.e.t.)	F.C. Kiryat Yam (2)
Hapoel Ra'anana (2)	4–0	Ihud Umm al-Fahm (3)
Maccabi Kiryat Malakhi (3)	3–2	Hapoel Daliyat al-Karmel (4)
Bnei Yehuda Tel Aviv (2)	3–4 (a.e.t.)	F.C. Ashdod (2)
Maccabi Jaffa (2)	1–3	Ironi Modi'in (2)
Ironi Nesher (3)	2–1	Hapoel Nir Ramat HaSharon (3)
Hapoel Bnei Jisr az-Zarqa (5)	0–9	Hapoel Kfar Shalem (2)
Hapoel Karmiel (3)	0–2	Hapoel Azor (3)
Hapoel Nof HaGalil (2)	1–2	Maccabi Yavne (3)

== Eighth round ==
The 14 seventh round winners, the four 2026–27 Liga Leumit teams given seventh round byes, and the 14 teams from the 2026–27 Israeli Premier League entered the eighth round.

Home Team	Score	Away Team
Maccabi Yavne (3)		Maccabi Herzliya (2)
Ironi Nesher (3)		Maccabi Bnei Reineh (2)
Hapoel Acre (2)		Maccabi Akhi Nazareth (2)
Hapoel Azor (3)		Maccabi Kiryat Gat (2)
Maccabi Kiryat Malakhi (3)		Ironi Tiberias (1)
Hapoel Jerusalem (1)		Hapoel Haifa (1)
Hapoel Kfar Shalem (2)		Hapoel Afula (2)
Hapoel Rishon LeZion (2)		Hapoel Petah Tikva (1)
F.C. Kiryat Yam (2)		Ironi Kiryat Shmona (1)
Ironi Modi'in (2)		Hapoel Ramat Gan (1)
F.C. Kafr Qasim (2)		Maccabi Petah Tikva (1)
Maccabi Netanya (1)		Hapoel Kfar Saba (2)
Bnei Sakhnin (1)		Hapoel Be'er Sheva (1)
Maccabi Haifa (1)		Hapoel Ra'anana (2)
Beitar Jerusalem (1)		F.C. Ashdod (2)
Hapoel Tel Aviv (1)		Maccabi Tel Aviv (1)
