= Omer Nir'on =

Israeli footballer (born 2001)

Personal information
- Full name: Omer Ya'acov Nir'on
- Date of birth: 17 April 2001 (age 25)
- Place of birth: Rishon LeZion, Israel
- Height: 1.95 m (6 ft 5 in)
- Position: Goalkeeper

Team information
- Current team: Maccabi Haifa
- Number: 99

Youth career
- 2010–2011: Maccabi Tel Aviv
- 2011–2012: Shimshon Tel Aviv
- 2012–2014: Maccabi Herzliya
- 2014–2017: Maccabi Tel Aviv
- 2017–2019: Bnei Yehuda

Senior career*
Years	Team	Apps	(Gls)
2019–2024	Bnei Yehuda	64	(0)
2019–2020	→ Hapoel Rishon LeZion (loan)	0	(0)
2021–2022	→ Hapoel Ramat HaSharon (loan)	32	(0)
2023–2024	→ Zrinjski Mostar (loan)	1	(0)
2024	→ Maccabi Netanya (loan)	10	(0)
2024–	Maccabi Netanya	52	(0)
2026–	→ Maccabi Haifa (loan)	0	(0)

International career^{‡}
2018–2019	Israel U19	5	(0)
2021	Israel U21	4	(0)
2024	Israel Olympic	3	(0)
- * Club domestic league appearances and goals as of 24 June 2026 ‡ National team caps and goals as of 1 August 2024

Omer Ya'acov Nir'on (Hebrew: עומר יעקב ניראון; born 17 April 2001) is an Israeli professional footballer who plays as a goalkeeper for Israeli club Maccabi Haifa on loan from Maccabi Netanya. He has previously played for Israeli clubs Bnei Yehuda and Hapoel Ramat HaSharon as well as Bosnian club Zrinjski Mostar. He has also represented Israel internationally at youth level. He is the son of retired Israeli footballer Danny Nir'on.

== Club career ==
=== Youth career ===
Nir'on started his career with Maccabi Tel Aviv's boys' team. He also played in his youth with Shimshon Tel Aviv and Maccabi Herzliya before joining the youth team of Bnei Yehuda when he was 16. Bnei Yehuda signed him on a 5-year contract.

=== Bnei Yehuda ===
Nir'on made his debut senior appearance for Bnei Yehuda on 18 August 2018, in a Toto Cup game against Bnei Sakhnin. He kept a clean sheet, but they lost the subsequent penalty shootout. His Israeli Premier League debut appearance was on 25 May 2019, during a 2–1 loss against Hapoel Hadera. In the summer of 2019, Nir'on was loaned to Hapoel Rishon LeZion, but he didn't register any match time with them and returned from loan in January 2020. During the 2020–21 Israeli Premier League season, Nir'on was the starting goalkeeper for Bnei Yehuda, but unfortunately they were relegated at the end of the season to the Liga Leumit. Nir'on gathered interest overseas, especially in Denmark, where he has a local passport through his family, and he impressed Lars Høgh, goalkeeping coach for Brøndby and Denmark, who recommended him for Nordsjælland, where he went for a two-week trial as well as with the Danish national youth team. Despite the club's interest in signing him on a long-term deal, in the end Nir'on declined the offer.

==== Loans ====
In the summer of 2022, Nir'on was loaned to Hapoel Ramat HaSharon for the season. In July 2023, Nir'on secured a loan with an option to buy to Bosnian defending champions Zrinjski Mostar, but he registered there only one appearance in which he conceded three goals and was recalled in January.

=== Maccabi Netanya ===
In January 2024, Nir'on was loaned to Maccabi Netanya, with a half-million buyout option. He made his debut for the club on 24 February against Beitar Jerusalem, keeping a clean sheet in a 0–0 draw. In April 2024, the club opted to pay the buyout clause and permanently sign Nir'on. In January 2026, Nir'on suffered an ankle injury in a match against Hapoel Tel Aviv, leading to him being replaced by Niv Antman while he recovered. Antman impressed and was selected as the first-choice goalkeeper for the remainder of the season, prompting Nir'on to undergo shoulder surgery after his recovery from the ankle injury, due to ongoing pain. He chose to have the surgery in England, with an initial assessment that he would miss five months of action. He was operated on by Dr. Andrew Wallace, who had also operated on Atlético Madrid goalkeeper Jan Oblak, and started a six-week rehabilitation program.

==== Loan to Maccabi Haifa ====
In August 2026, following recovery from his shoulder surgery and after extensive medical testing, Nir'on joined Maccabi Haifa on loan for the 2026–27 Israeli Premier League season. The club paid a reported €100,000 loan fee and held a €250,000 purchase option for him. He joined as the club's second-choice goalkeeper, replacing Shareef Keouf, who was ruled out for the remainder of the season with an injury.

== International career ==
=== Israel under-19 ===
In November 2018, Nir'on was called up for the Israel under-19 squad to play in the qualifying round of the 2019 UEFA European Under-19 Championship qualifiers. He played in the 4–1 victory over Azerbaijan and the 2–1 victory over Liechtenstein. In March 2019, he was called up again for the squad to play in the elite round. He took part in the 3–0 victory over Switzerland.

In October 2019, Nir'on was called up once more for the squad, to play in the qualifying round of the 2020 UEFA European Under-19 Championship qualifiers. He played in the 0–0 draw with Latvia and the 2–0 loss to Netherlands.

=== Israel under-21 ===
In September 2021, Nir'on was called up for the Israel under-21 squad to play in the 2023 UEFA European Under-21 Championship qualifiers. Due to regular starting goalkeeper Daniel Peretz being called up to the senior squad, Nir'on started the match against Germany and despite losing 3–2, he received plaudits and the coach Alon Hazan said he trusts him 100%. He then started the next match against Latvia which they won 2–1, with Nir'on making some key saves. After that he also played and kept clean sheets in the 4–0 victory over San Marino and the 3–0 victory over Hungary.

=== 2024 Olympic Games ===
Following a good start to his time at Maccabi Netanya, Nir'on was called up as the alternate goalkeeper for Israel's Olympic football team competing in the men's tournament in the 2024 Summer Olympics. On 18 July 2024, it was announced that the team's starting goalkeeper, Daniel Peretz, was withdrawn from the squad due to injury and Nir'on was promoted to the 18-player squad. Due to an injury to the team's goalkeeper Niv Eliasi, Nir'on started the first match of the Olympics group stage against Mali. The match ended in a 1–1 draw, and he received positive feedback after a strong performance including 5 saves. Following this, the coach Guy Luzon said that Nir'on would start the next match against Paraguay. Despite losing the match 4–2, Nir'on was chosen as Israel's best player on the field. He also played in Israel's last match of the tournament against Japan, in which he made some great saves before conceding in injury time, leaving the scoreline at 1–0. Despite the team being eliminated in the group stage, Nir'on received positive comments and was lauded for the many saves he made during the tournament.

== Personal life ==
Nir'on is the son of retired professional Israeli footballer Danny Nir'on. Danny had a Danish passport through his mother and even played for Danish club Hvidovre. Due to this, Nir'on also holds a Danish passport and is eligible to represent them internationally.
