= Danny Nir'on =

Israeli footballer

Danny Nir'on דני ניראון
Personal information
- Date of birth: 24 January 1971 (age 55)
- Place of birth: Petah Tikva, Israel
- Position: Striker

Youth career
- Hapoel Petah Tikva

Senior career*
Years	Team	Apps	(Gls)
1987–1993	Hapoel Petah Tikva	105	(28)
1994–1996	Hapoel Haifa		
1996–1998	Hvidovre IF		
1998–1999	Hapoel Be'er Sheva		
1999–2000	Tzafririm Holon		

Managerial career
- 2006–2008: Hapoel Petah Tikva (youth and assistant manager)
- 2009: Hapoel Petah Tikva
- 2010: Ironi Jat Al-Ahli
- 2011–2013: Hapoel Petah Tikva (youth)
- 2013–2014: Hakoah Amidar Ramat Gan
- * Club domestic league appearances and goals

Danny Nir'on (Hebrew: דני ניראון; born 24 January 1971) is an Israeli football manager and former player. His mother is a Jew of a Danish descent.

== Managerial career ==
On 23 November 2009, Nir'on resigned after his team Hapoel Petah Tikva had lost 7–1 to Hapoel Tel Aviv.

== Personal life ==
Danny is the father of the professional footballer Omer Nir'on.

== Honours ==
- Toto Cup: 1989–90, 1990–91
