= Gadi Hazut =

Israeli footballer

Gadi Hazut גדי חזות
Personal information
- Full name: Gadi Hazut
- Date of birth: 20 July 1969 (age 57)
- Place of birth: Be'er Sheva, Israel
- Height: 1.77 m (5 ft 9 1/2 in)
- Position: Right back

Youth career
- Hapoel Be'er Sheva

Senior career*
Years	Team	Apps	(Gls)
1988–1997	Hapoel Be'er Sheva	189	(11)
1997–1999	Maccabi Ironi Ashdod	48	(1)
1999–2000	F.C. Ashdod	10	(0)

International career^{‡}
1988–1990	Israel	1	(0)
- * Club domestic league appearances and goals as of 27 July 2015 ‡ National team caps and goals as of 27 July 2015

Gadi Hazut (Hebrew: גדי חזות; born 20 July 1969) is an Israeli former professional footballer that has played in Hapoel Be'er Sheva.

== Honours ==
=== Club ===
Hapoel Be'er Sheva

- Premier League:
  - Third place (3): 1993/1994, 1994/1995, 1996/1997
- State Cup:
  - Winners (1): 1996/1997
- Toto Cup:
  - Winners (2): 1988/1989, 1995/1996
- Lillian Cup:
  - Winners (1): 1988
