= Nigel Lonwijk =

Dutch footballer (born 2002)

Personal information
- Full name: Nigel Cello Lonwijk
- Date of birth: 27 October 2002 (age 24)
- Place of birth: Goirle, Netherlands
- Height: 1.95 m (6 ft 5 in)
- Position: Defender

Team information
- Current team: Maccabi Haifa
- Number: 21

Youth career
- –2020: PSV Eindhoven
- 2020–2021: Wolverhampton Wanderers

Senior career*
Years	Team	Apps	(Gls)
2021–2026	Wolverhampton Wanderers	0	(0)
2021–2022	→ Fortuna Sittard (loan)	22	(1)
2022–2023	→ Plymouth Argyle (loan)	35	(0)
2023	→ Grasshoppers (loan)	1	(0)
2024	→ Wycombe Wanderers (loan)	8	(2)
2024–2025	→ Huddersfield Town (loan)	21	(1)
2025–2026	→ Luton Town (loan)	37	(2)
2026–	Maccabi Haifa	0	(0)

International career
2018	Netherlands U16	1	(0)
- * Club domestic league appearances and goals as of 19:26, 24 July 2026 (UTC)

Nigel Cello Lonwijk (born 27 October 2002) is a Dutch professional footballer who plays as a defender for Israeli Premier League club Maccabi Haifa.

== Club career ==
After playing youth football for PSV Eindhoven, Lonwijk signed for Premier League club Wolverhampton Wanderers in January 2020, initially joining their under-18 side. Lonwijk joined the club's under-23 team for the 2020–21 season and appeared on the first-team bench four times, but failed to make his debut. On 31 August 2021, Lonwijk signed a new contract with the club, lasting until summer 2023 with the option for an additional year, and also joined Eredivisie club Fortuna Sittard on loan. He made his debut for the club on 12 September 2021 as a substitute in a 3–1 Eredivisie defeat to Sparta Rotterdam.

On 29 July 2022, Lonwijk signed for EFL League One club Plymouth Argyle on loan for the 2022–23 season.

Following a successful spell with Plymouth, which saw them become champions of League One, he went on another loan, this time to Grasshoppers in Switzerland, where he was joined by fellow Wolves loanee Theo Corbeanu in the Swiss Super League. However, he suffered a hamstring injury during pre-season preparation, which sidelined him until October. He finally made his debut on 28 October 2023 in a 1–3 away defeat to St. Gallen, playing the entire second half at right-back, during which he once again injured his hamstring. This injury caused his loan to be cut short on 16 November 2023. Nevertheless, on 1 February 2024 Lonwijk joined Wycombe Wanderers on loan for the remainder of the season.

On 28 August 2024, Lonwijk joined League One club Huddersfield Town on a season-long loan deal. However, he was ruled out for the remainder of the season in March 2025 following a hamstring injury.

On 10 July 2025, Lonwijk signed a contract extension at Wolves before joining Luton Town on another season-long loan deal.

On 24 July 2026, Lonwijk signed permanently for Israeli Premier League side Maccabi Haifa, leaving Wolves after over six years at the club.

== International career ==
Lonwijk was born in the Netherlands to a Surinamese father and Dutch mother. He has represented the Netherlands at under-16 level.

== Style of play ==
Lonwijk is right-footed and plays as a centre-back. In January 2020, Wolves' head of academy Scott Sellars stated Lonwijk is "very good physically, a good defender one-on-one, and has strong technical ability".

== Personal life ==
Born in Goirle, Lonwijk grew up in Tilburg. He is the younger brother of Surinamese international Justin Lonwijk, who plays for Ukrainian club Dynamo Kyiv, while his younger sister Jayden plays tennis.

== Career statistics ==
=== Club ===
As of match played 25 April 2026

Appearances and goals by club, season and competition
Club	Season	League			National cup (Note: Includes FA Cup, KNVB Cup and Swiss Cup)		League cup (Note: Includes EFL Cup)		Other		Total	
Club	Season	Division	Apps	Goals	Apps	Goals	Apps	Goals	Apps	Goals	Apps	Goals
Wolverhampton Wanderers U21	2020–21	—			—		—		2 (Note: Appearance(s) in EFL Trophy)	0	2	0
Wolverhampton Wanderers	2021–22	Premier League	0	0	0	0	0	0	—		0	0
Wolverhampton Wanderers	2022–23	Premier League	0	0	0	0	0	0	—		0	0
Wolverhampton Wanderers	2023–24	Premier League	0	0	0	0	0	0	—		0	0
Wolverhampton Wanderers	2024–25	Premier League	0	0	0	0	0	0	—		0	0
Wolverhampton Wanderers	2025–26	Premier League	0	0	0	0	0	0	—		0	0
Wolverhampton Wanderers	Total		0	0	0	0	0	0	—		0	0
Fortuna Sittard (loan)	2021–22	Eredivisie	22	1	1	0	—		—		23	1
Plymouth Argyle (loan)	2022–23	League One	35	0	1	0	1	0	4	0	41	0
Grasshoppers (loan)	2023–24	Swiss Super League	1	0	0	0	—		—		1	0
Wycombe Wanderers (loan)	2023–24	League One	11	2	—		—		2	0	13	2
Huddersfield Town (loan)	2024–25	League One	21	1	1	0	0	0	4	0	26	1
Luton Town (loan)	2025–26	League One	37	2	1	0	1	0	6	0	45	2
Maccabi Haifa	2026–27	Israeli Premier League	0	0	—		—		0	0	0	0
Career total			127	6	4	0	2	0	18	0	151	6

== Honours ==
Plymouth Argyle

- EFL League One: 2022–23
- EFL Trophy runner-up: 2022–23

Wycombe Wanderers

- EFL Trophy runner-up: 2023–24

Luton Town

- EFL Trophy: 2025–26
