= Remilk =

Israeli food company

- Industry: Food
- Founded: June 14, 2019; 7 years ago
- Founders: Aviv Wolff; Ori Cohavi
- Headquarters: Rehovot, Israel
- Key people: Aviv Wolff (CEO); Ori Cohavi (CTO)
- Products: Animal- free dairy
- Website: remilk.com

Remilk is a multi-national Israeli company that specializes in the production of cultured milk and dairy products. The company was founded in 2019 by CEO Aviv Wolff and CTO Ori Cohavi. It has developed a method of yeast-based fermentation to produce milk proteins with an identical chemical compound to that of milk traditionally produced by cows.

== History ==
Remilk was founded in 2019 by Aviv Wolff and Ori Cohavi.

In December 2020, the company completed a Series A funding round of $11 million. Among its initial investors were Hochland SE, one of the largest dairy companies in Germany, Tnuva, the largest dairy conglomerate in Israel, and Tempo.

In November 2021, the multinational venture capital fund, Hanaco Ventures, led a funding round for the company and raised $120 million to increase the company's manufacturing capabilities.

In April 2022, the company announced that it is planning to open the world's largest fermentation facility in Denmark. The full-scale fermentation facility will be built on more than 750,000 square feet in the Kalundborg Eco-industrial Park.

In June 2022, Remilk received FDA approval, and in early 2023 the Singapore Food Agency and later the Ministry of Health in Israel granted the company regulatory approval to market and sell cow-free milk products to consumers. In early 2024, Health Canada granted regulatory approval to the company to market and sell its products to Canadian consumers.

In November 2025, it was announced that Gad Dairy, in cooperation with Remilk, were going to begin marketing a line of "New Milk" products based on Remilk's milk protein producing technology.

== Product ==
In order to produce cow-free milk, the company uses genetically-modified single-cell microbes in order to create milk proteins on a large scale. The resulting milk is identical, in terms of taste and texture, to the milk that is traditionally produced from cows but is devoid of lactose, cholesterol, hormones and anti-biotics. It is then dried up into powder form which can then be used in derivatives of milk-based products such as yogurt, cheese and ice-cream

Companies that currently use traditional dairy can replace their dairy proteins with Remilk's protein.

As for sustainability, Remilk estimates its process uses just 1% of the land, 4% of the greenhouse gas emissions, and 5% of the water required to produce comparable products in the traditional dairy manufacturing process.
