= Kenji Gorré =

Footballer (born 1994)

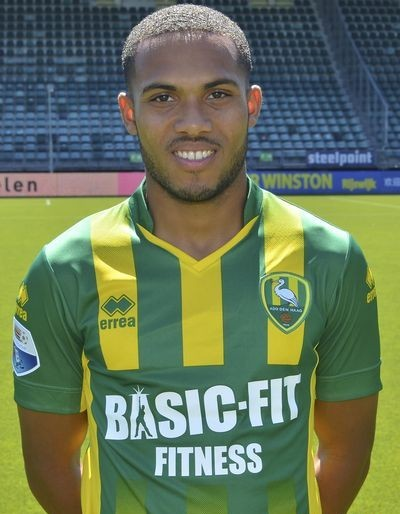
- Gorré with ADO Den Haag in 2015

Personal information
- Full name: Kenji Joël Gorré
- Date of birth: 29 September 1994 (age 32)
- Place of birth: Spijkenisse, Netherlands
- Height: 1.78 m (5 ft 10 in)
- Position: Winger

Team information
- Current team: Maccabi Haifa
- Number: 11

Youth career
- –2002: Manchester City
- 2002–2013: Manchester United
- 2013–2014: Swansea City

Senior career*
Years	Team	Apps	(Gls)
2014–2018	Swansea City	1	(0)
2015–2016	→ ADO Den Haag (loan)	6	(1)
2016–2017	→ Northampton Town (loan)	18	(1)
2018–2021	Nacional	60	(7)
2019	→ Estoril (loan)	14	(3)
2021–2023	Boavista	60	(5)
2023–2025	Umm Salal	39	(12)
2025–	Maccabi Haifa	29	(6)

International career^{‡}
2019–	Curaçao	43	(10)
- * Club domestic league appearances and goals as of 19 September 2026 ‡ National team caps and goals as of 4 October 2026

Kenji Joël Gorré (born 29 September 1994) is a professional footballer who plays as a winger for Israeli club Maccabi Haifa, where he uses as a captain. Born in the Netherlands, he represents the Curaçao national team. He is the son of former professional footballer Dean Gorré.

== Club career ==
=== Youth career ===
Born in Spijkenisse, Netherlands, Gorré lived in Netherlands before moving to England, when his father transferred to Huddersfield Town when he was four and lived in England ever since. Gorré attended North Cestrian Grammar School. Gorré's decision to play football was supported by his parents.

In 2002, Gorré moved from Manchester City Academy to Manchester United Academy. When Gorré was fifteen, Gorré became a transfer target from Arsenal and Chelsea. Despite, Gorré remained at the club and two years later, on 26 July 2011, Gorré scored in a 7–0 win over County Tyrone in the Milk Cup. The following month, Gorré began to start his first year scholars at the academy.

Then in February 2013, Gorré went on trial at Scottish Premier League champions Celtic, but he did not sign on a permanent basis. This came after Gorré was released from the Manchester United Academy.

=== Swansea City ===
In March 2013, Gorré began training with Premier League side Swansea City. Gorré made an impressive performance at the trial and convinced the Swansea City management to give him a one-year contract.

Shortly signing for Swansea City, Gorré was featured in the pre-season friendly matches and scored two goals against Excelsior and Haaglandia. Despite being given forty-six shirt, Gorré was sent to the Swansea City Reserves and played there throughout the 2013–14 season.

On 4 July 2014, Gorré signed a new two-year contract keeping him at the club until June 2016. This came after when Gorré was offered a professional contract. Later in the 2014–15 season, Gorré became the top scorer for Swansea Under-21s during the 2014–15 Professional U21 Development League 2 season, and scored twice as the Under-21s won the league title. After impressing for the Under-21s, Gorré made his professional debut for Swansea in a 1–0 Premier League loss away to Crystal Palace on 24 May 2015.

On 6 July 2015, Gorré signed a new three-year contract with Swansea City, keeping him at the club until the summer of 2018. Two days later, on 8 July 2015, Swansea City agreed a deal to loan Gorré out to Dutch side ADO Den Haag, Gorré made his ADO Den Haag debut as a 76th-minute substitute, and set up a goal from a free kick to goalkeeper, Martin Hansen, to score his first ever professional goal, to earn his team a last-minute draw against PSV. However, six days later, Gorré was sent to the reserves to play against Jong Heracles and in the 36th minute, he received a straight red card for a professional foul. After the match, KNVB decided against giving Gorré a game suspension. However, Gorré went on to make five appearances, having spent the first half of the season at ADO Den Haag on the bench and on 30 January 2016, it was confirmed that Gorré had returned to Swansea City following his loan spell at ADO Den Haag.

Following his return from a loan at ADO Den Haag, Gorré returned to the club's reserves and scored on his return, in a 2–1 win over Derby County.

On 29 July 2016, Gorré joined Northampton Town on a six-month loan deal until January 2017.

He was unable to break into the first team at Swansea, and despite being offered a new contract, he left the club at the end of his original three-year deal in June 2018.

=== Nacional ===
Following his release by Swansea, Gorré signed for Primeira Liga club Nacional.

In January 2019 he dropped a division to join LigaPro side Estoril on loan until the end of the remaining season.

=== Boavista ===
On 22 July 2021, Porto-based side Boavista announced the free signing of Gorré on a two-year contract.

=== Umm Salal ===
On 16 June 2023, after his contract with Boavista expired, Gorré signed a two-year deal with Qatari club Umm Salal.

=== Maccabi Haifa ===
On 17 July 2025, after his contract with Umm Salal expired, Gorré signed a three-year with Israeli club Maccabi Haifa.

== International career ==
Gorré was born in the Netherlands to a Surinamese father, Dean Gorré, and a Curaçaoan mother (Magali from The Real Housewives of Cheshire) and is eligible for all three national teams. Gorré is also eligible to play for England, citing having engaged in a minimum of five years education under the age of 18 within the territory of the relevant association. Gorré was initially approached by the English FA before being selected by KNVB instead. He never played for their youth team.

In November 2016, Gorré was called up to and played for the Curaçao national team in their friendly against Eredivisie side Excelsior in Rotterdam. In 2019, he was selected for the country's 2019 Gold Cup squad and made his debut on 25 June 2019 in the last group game against Jamaica. He came on as a substitute in the 70th minute for Jarchinio Antonia, Curaçao equalised in added time to advance to the knock-out stage.

On 18 May 2026, he was named by head coach Dick Advocaat in the 26-man squad for the 2026 FIFA World Cup, marking the country's first-ever appearance at the tournament.

== Career statistics ==
=== Club ===
As of match played 19 September 2026

Appearances and goals by club, season and competition
Club	Season	League			Cup		League Cup		Continental		Other		Total	
Club	Season	Division	Apps	Goals	Apps	Goals	Apps	Goals	Apps	Goals	Apps	Goals	Apps	Goals
Swansea City	2014–15	Premier League	1	0	0	0	0	0	—		–		1	0
ADO Den Haag (loan)	2015–16	Eredivisie	5	0	–		–		–		1	1	6	1
Northampton Town (loan)	2016–17	League One	13	1	0	0	3	0	—		2	0	18	1
Swansea City U21	2017–18	—			—		—		—		4	4	4	4
Nacional	2018–19	Primeira Liga	11	1	0	0	4	0	–		–		15	1
Nacional	2018–19	Liga Portugal 2	20	2	1	0	0	0	–		–		21	2
Nacional	2020–21	Primeira Liga	29	4	3	1	0	0	–		–		32	5
Nacional	Total		60	7	4	1	4	0	–		–		68	8
Estoril (loan)	2018–19	Liga Portugal 2	14	3	0	0	0	0	–		–		14	3
Boavista	2021–22	Primeira Liga	30	4	1	0	2	0	–		–		33	4
Boavista	2022–23	Primeira Liga	30	1	1	0	1	1	–		–		32	2
Boavista	Total		60	5	2	0	3	1	–		–		65	6
Umm Salal	2023–24	Qatar Stars League	22	9	2	1	4	1	–		–		28	11
Umm Salal	2024–25	Qatar Stars League	17	3	3	1	3	2	–		1 (Note: Appearance in relegation play-offs)	0	24	6
Umm Salal	Total		39	12	5	2	7	3	–		1	0	52	17
Maccabi Haifa	2025–26	Israeli Premier League	25	4	3	1	–		1 (Note: Appearance in UEFA Conference League)	0	–		29	5
Maccabi Haifa	2026–27	Israeli Premier League	4	1	0	0	–		–		–		4	1
Maccabi Haifa	Total		29	5	3	1	–		1	0	–		33	6
Career total			221	33	14	4	17	4	1	0	8	5	261	46

=== International ===
As of match played 4 October 2026

Appearances and goals by national team and year
National team	Year	Apps	Goals
Curaçao	2019	4	0
Curaçao	2021	3	2
Curaçao	2022	5	0
Curaçao	2023	8	1
Curaçao	2024	6	0
Curaçao	2025	10	3
Curaçao	2026	7	4
Total		43	10

Scores and results list Curacao goal tally first, score column indicates score after each Gorré goal

List of international goals scored by Kenji Gorré
No.	Date	Venue	Opponent	Score	Result	Competition
1	5 June 2021	Manuel Felipe Carrera Stadium, Guatemala City, Guatemala	British Virgin Islands	7–0	8–0	2022 FIFA World Cup qualification
2	5 June 2021	Manuel Felipe Carrera Stadium, Guatemala City, Guatemala	British Virgin Islands	8–0	8–0	2022 FIFA World Cup qualification
3	18 October 2024	Ergilio Hato Stadium, Willemstad, Curaçao	Trinidad and Tobago	2–0	5–3	2023–24 CONCACAF Nations League A
4	11 June 2025	Trinidad Stadium, Oranjestad, Aruba	Haiti	2–0	5–1	2026 FIFA World Cup qualification
5	11 October 2025	Ergilio Hato Stadium, Willemstad, Curaçao	Jamaica	1–0	2–0	2026 FIFA World Cup qualification
6	14 October 2025	Ergilio Hato Stadium, Willemstad, Curaçao	Trinidad and Tobago	1–0	1–1	2026 FIFA World Cup qualification
7	24 September 2026	Ricardo Saprissa Aymá, San José, Costa Rica	Costa Rica	1–3	4–3	2026–27 CONCACAF Nations League A
8	24 September 2026	Ricardo Saprissa Aymá, San José, Costa Rica	Costa Rica	3–3	4–3	2026–27 CONCACAF Nations League A
9	27 September 2026	Ergilio Hato Stadium, Willemstad, Curaçao	Nicaragua	2–0	6–1	2026–27 CONCACAF Nations League A
10	27 September 2026	Ergilio Hato Stadium, Willemstad, Curaçao	Nicaragua	5–0	6–1	2026–27 CONCACAF Nations League A

== Personal life ==
Gorré is a Christian. He is married to Izabella Gorré.
