= Yair Mordechai =

Israeli footballer

Yair Mordechai יאיר מרדכי
Personal information
- Full name: Yair Mordechai
- Date of birth: 29 September 2003 (age 23)
- Place of birth: Kiryat Shmona, Israel
- Height: 1.83 m (6 ft 0 in)
- Position: Forward

Team information
- Current team: Maccabi Haifa
- Number: 7

Youth career
- 2013–2023: Ironi Kiryat Shmona

Senior career*
Years	Team	Apps	(Gls)
2023–2026	Ironi Kiryat Shmona	100	(19)
2026-	Maccabi Haifa	0	(0)
- * Club domestic league appearances and goals as of 24 June 2026

Yair Mordechai (Hebrew: יאיר מרדכי; born 1 September 2003) is an Israeli footballer who currently plays as a forward for Maccabi Haifa .

== Career statistics ==
=== Club ===
As of 24 June 2026.

Club	Season	League			State Cup		Toto Cup		Continental		Other		Total	
Club	Season	Division	Apps	Goals	Apps	Goals	Apps	Goals	Apps	Goals	Apps	Goals	Apps	Goals
Ironi Kiryat Shmona	2022–23	Israeli Premier League	1	0	0	0	1	0	–		0	0	2	0
Ironi Kiryat Shmona	2023–24	Liga Leumit	33	8	3	2	4	0	–		0	0	40	10
Ironi Kiryat Shmona	2024–25	Israeli Premier League	33	1	1	0	5	1	–		0	0	39	2
Ironi Kiryat Shmona	2025–26	Israeli Premier League	33	10	1	0	5	1	–		0	0	39	11
Ironi Kiryat Shmona	Total		100	19	5	2	15	2	0	0	0	0	120	23
Career total			100	19	5	2	15	2	0	0	0	0	120	23
