= Ziv Arie =

Israeli football manager (born 1971)

Ziv Arie זיו אריה
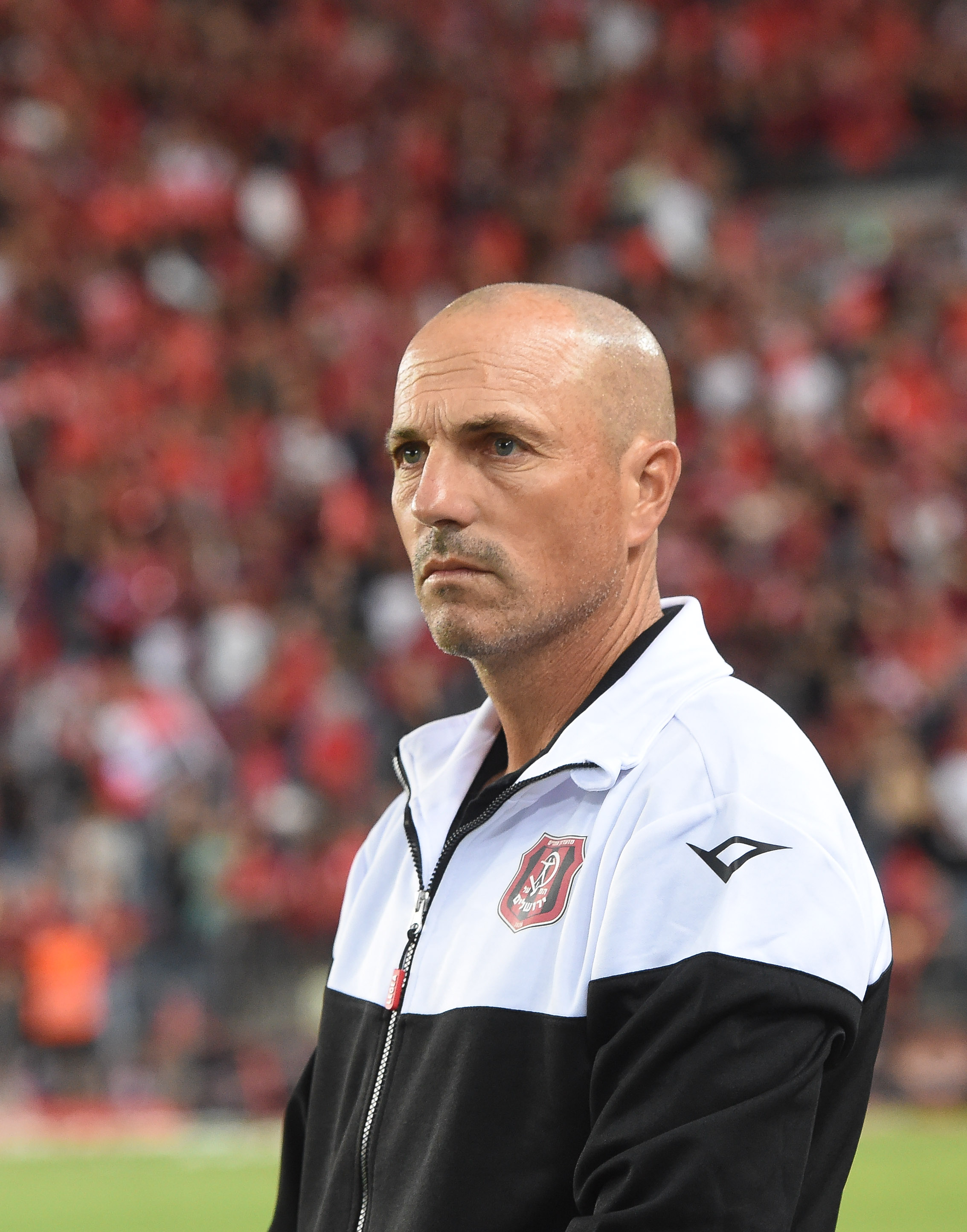

Personal information
- Date of birth: 22 January 1971 (age 55)
- Place of birth: Kiryat Ono, Israel

Team information
- Current team: Maccabi Petah Tikva (head coach)

Youth career
- Maccabi Tel Aviv

Senior career*
Years	Team	Apps	(Gls)
- Shimshon Tel Aviv
- Maccabi Ramat Amidar
- Hapoel Yehud

Managerial career
- 2013–2016: Maccabi Tel Aviv (U-20)
- 2016–2017: Beitar Jerusalem (U-20)
- 2017: Dila
- 2017–2019: Beitar Tel Aviv
- 2019–2026: Hapoel Jerusalem
- 2026–: Maccabi Petah Tikva
- * Club domestic league appearances and goals

Ziv Arie (Hebrew: זיו אריה; born 22 January 1971) is an Israeli football manager who is currently the head coach of Israeli Premier League club Maccabi Petah Tikva.

== Early life ==
Arie started playing football at the age of nine.

== Career ==
In 2017, Arie was appointed manager of Georgian side Dila. In 2019, he was appointed manager of Israeli side Hapoel Jerusalem.

== Personal life ==
Arie is married and has two daughters and a son.
