= Ethan Azoulay =

Israeli footballer (born 2004)

Ethane Azoulay
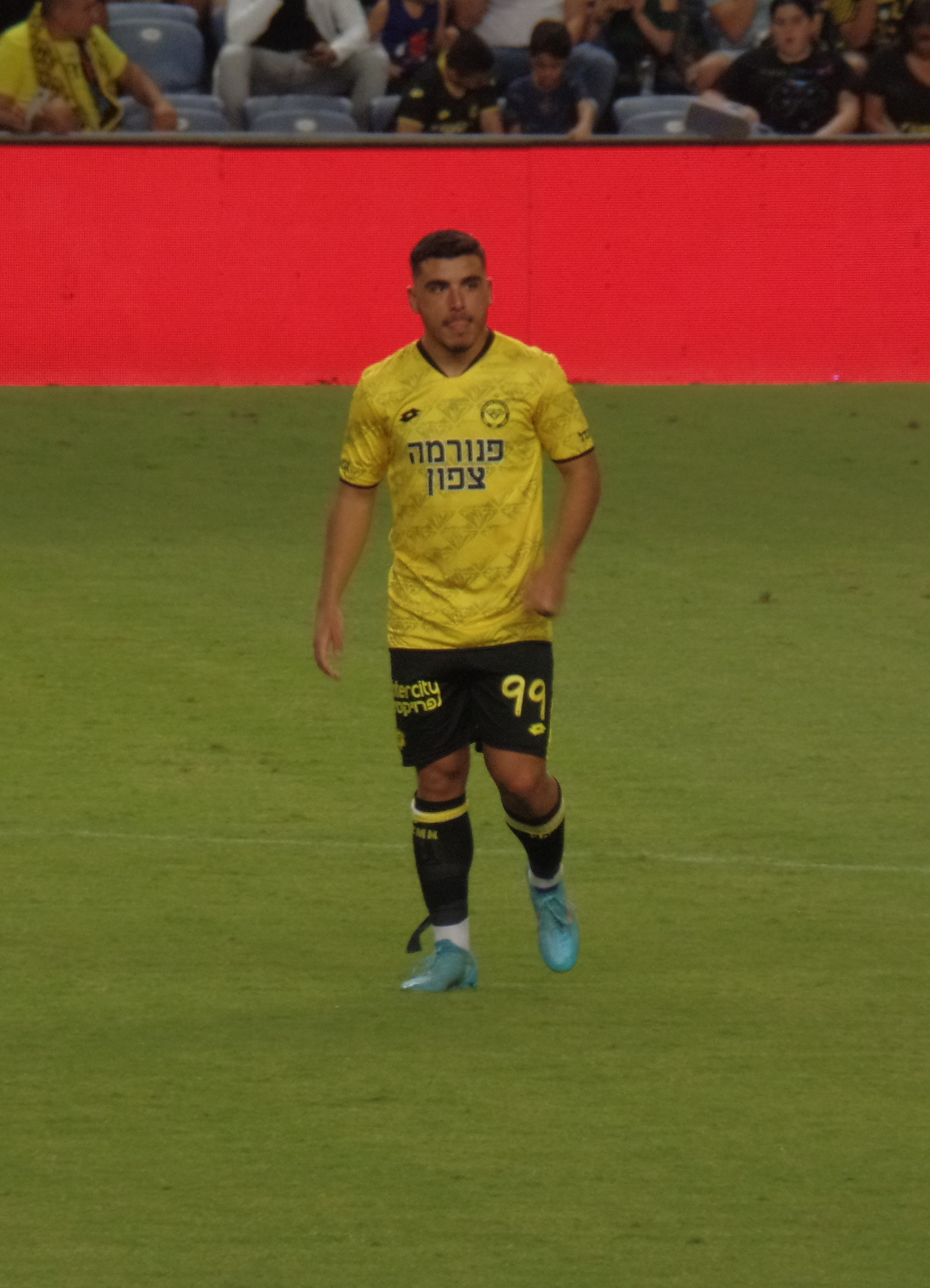

Personal information
- Date of birth: 26 May 2002 (age 24)
- Place of birth: Paris, France
- Height: 1.75 m (5 ft 9 in)
- Position: Central midfielder

Team information
- Current team: Maccabi Haifa
- Number: 19.5

Youth career
- 2010–2011: Beitar Tubruk
- 2011–2013: Maccabi Tel Aviv
- 2013–2017: Maccabi Netanya
- 2017–2018: Beitar Tubruk
- 2018–2021: Maccabi Petah Tikva

Senior career*
Years	Team	Apps	(Gls)
2020–2022	Maccabi Petah Tikva	55	(1)
2022–2024	Maccabi Netanya	48	(4)
2024–	Maccabi Haifa	59	(6)

International career^{‡}
2018–2019	Israel U18	11	(1)
2019	Israel U19	2	(0)
2021–2023	Israel U21	14	(0)
2024	Israel U23	3	(0)
2024–	Israel	7	(0)
- * Club domestic league appearances and goals as of 23 June 2026 ‡ National team caps and goals as of 21:10, 17 November 2026 (UTC)

Ethane Azoulay (Hebrew: איתן אזולאי; born 26 May 2002) is an Israeli professional footballer who plays as a defensive midfielder for Israeli Premier League club Maccabi Haifa and the Israel national team.

== Early life ==
Azoulay was born in Paris, France.

== Club career ==
Azoulay started his career in Beitar Tubruk, then played also for Maccabi Netanya, Maccabi Tel Aviv and Maccabi Petah Tikva.

On 12 June 2020, 2019–20 season, he made his debut in a 0–2 loss to Hapoel Ramat HaSharon at HaMoshava Stadium.

On 21 August 2022 signed in Maccabi Netanya for 3 seasons with option of more one season. Netanya paid 2.3 Million Shekels and became the most expensive player in the club's history.

== International career ==
Azoulay was the commander of Israel national under-21 football team. He was a part of the Israel squad that qualified to the UEFA European Under-21 Championship semi final. He was named in the squad to compete in the 2024 Summer Olympics.

Azoulay made his debut for the Israel national team on 10 October 2024 in a UEFA Nations League game against France at Bozsik Aréna in Budapest, Hungary. He sbustituted Mohammad Abu Fani in the 67th minute as France won 4–1.

== Career statistics ==
=== Club ===
As of 23 June 2026

Appearances and goals by club, season and competition
Club	Season	League			National cup		League cup (Note: Includes the Israel Toto Cup (Ligat Ha'Al))		Continental (Note: Includes the UEFA Conference League)		Other		Total	
Club	Season	Division	Apps	Goals	Apps	Goals	Apps	Goals	Apps	Goals	Apps	Goals	Apps	Goals
Maccabi Petah Tikva	2019–20	Liga Leumit	6	0	1	0	0	0	–		0	0	7	0
Maccabi Petah Tikva	2020–21	Israeli Premier League	19	0	1	0	3	0	–		0	0	23	0
Maccabi Petah Tikva	2021–22	Israeli Premier League	30	2	4	0	5	0	–		0	0	39	2
Maccabi Petah Tikva	Total		55	2	6	0	8	0	0	0	0	0	69	2
Maccabi Netanya	2022–23	Israeli Premier League	27	0	6	0	1	0	–		0	0	34	0
Maccabi Netanya	2023–24	Israeli Premier League	20	4	2	1	5	2	–		0	0	27	7
Maccabi Netanya	Total		47	4	8	1	6	2	0	0	0	0	61	7
Maccabi Haifa	2024–25	Israeli Premier League	30	0	2	2	2	0	–		0	0	34	2
Maccabi Haifa	2025–26	Israeli Premier League	29	6	1	1	1	0	4	1	0	0	35	8
Maccabi Haifa	Total		59	6	3	3	3	0	4	1	0	0	69	10
Career total			161	12	17	4	17	2	4	1	0	0	199	19

== See also ==
- List of Jewish footballers
- List of Jews in sports
- List of Israelis
