= Pedro Brazão =

Portuguese footballer

Personal information
- Full name: Pedro David Brazão Teixeira
- Date of birth: 30 December 2002 (age 23)
- Place of birth: Lisbon, Portugal
- Height: 1.72 m (5 ft 8 in)
- Position: Attacking midfielder

Team information
- Current team: Maccabi Haifa
- Number: 30

Senior career*
Years	Team	Apps	(Gls)
2018–2020	Nice II	22	(1)
2019–2021	Nice	1	(0)
2020–2021	→ Lausanne-Sport (loan)	20	(1)
2021–2023	Famalicão	17	(1)
2023–2026	Bodrum	86	(10)
2026–	Maccabi Haifa	4	(2)

International career
2018	Portugal U16	6	(1)
2018–2019	Portugal U17	15	(5)
2019	Portugal U18	5	(0)
2019–2020	Portugal U19	3	(0)
2021–2022	Portugal U20	7	(1)
- * Club domestic league appearances and goals as of 17 October 2026

Pedro David Brazão Teixeira (born 30 December 2002) is a Portuguese professional footballer who plays as an attacking midfielder for Israeli Premier League club Maccabi Haifa.

== Career ==
Brazão began playing football in Portugal, before moving with his mother to France.

=== Nice ===
In 2017, he signed with the youth academy of Nice. On 5 April 2019, he signed his first professional contract with the club. He made his professional debut for Nice in a 1–0 Ligue 1 loss to Caen on 20 April 2019.

==== Lausanne-Sport (loan) ====
During the 2020–21 season, he was on loan at Lausanne-Sport in Switzerland.

=== Famalicão ===
On 18 August 2021, he returned to Portugal and signed a five-year contract with Famalicão.

=== Bodrum ===
On 26 July 2023, Turkish second division side Bodrum announced the signing of Brazão on a three-year contract, for an undisclosed fee.
