= 2026–27 Liga Leumit =

Liga Leumit
- Dates: 18 August 2026 – 7 May 2027
- Matches: 104
- Goals: 321 (3.09 per match)
- Top goalscorer: Stav Nachmani (12 goals)
- Biggest home win: Hapoel Ra'anana 6–1 Hapoel Kfar Saba; F.C. Kiryat Yam 5–0 Hapoel Acre (6 September 2026)
- Biggest away win: Ironi Modi'in 0–6 Maccabi Bnei Reineh (23 October 2026)
- Highest scoring: Maccabi Jaffa 2–6 F.C. Kiryat Yam (18 August 2026)
- Longest winning run: F.C. Ashdod (8)
- Longest unbeaten run: Bnei Yehuda Tel Aviv (11)
- Longest winless run: Hapoel Acre (12)
- Longest losing run: Hapoel Acre (6)
- All statistics correct as of 2 November 2026.

The 2026–27 Liga Leumit is the 28th season as second tier since its realignment in 1999 and the 85th season of second-tier football in Israel.

== Teams ==
A total of sixteen teams are contesting in the league, including twelve sides from the 2025–26 season, the two promoted teams from Liga Alef and the two relegated teams from 2025–26 Israeli Premier League.

=== Team changes ===
The following teams have changed division since the 2023–24 season.

==== To Liga Leumit ====
===== Promoted from Liga Alef =====
Following the Israel-Iran war the Israel Football Association stopped all the non-professional leagues. Therefore, the teams that were in first place were promoted.

- Maccabi Kiryat Gat (South Division)
- Maccabi Akhi Nazareth (North Division)

===== Relegated from Premier League =====
- F.C. Ashdod
- Maccabi Bnei Reineh

==== From Liga Leumit ====
===== Promoted to Premier League =====
- Maccabi Petah Tikva
- Hapoel Ramat Gan Givatayim

===== Relegated to Liga Alef =====
- Hapoel Nof HaGalil
- Hapoel Hadera

=== Stadia and locations ===
Locations of the 2026–27 Liga Leumit teams

Club	Home City	Stadium	Capacity
Bnei Yehuda Tel Aviv	Tel Aviv	Hatikva Neighborhood Stadium	2,700
F.C. Ashdod	Ashdod	Yud-Alef Stadium	7,800
F.C. Kafr Qasim	Kafr Qasim	Bat Yam Municipal Stadium (Note: Play their home games at a neutral venue because their own ground does not meet league requirements.)	2,800
F.C. Kiryat Yam	Kiryat Yam	Acre Municipal Stadium	5,000
Hapoel Acre	Acre	Acre Municipal Stadium	5,000
Hapoel Afula	Afula	Afula Illit Stadium	3,000
Hapoel Kfar Saba	Kfar Saba	Levita Stadium	5,800
Hapoel Kfar Shalem	Tel Aviv	Hatikva Neighborhood Stadium	2,700
Hapoel Ra'anana	Ra'anana	Herzliya Municipal Stadium	8,100
Hapoel Rishon LeZion	Rishon LeZion	Haberfeld Stadium	6,000
Ironi Modi'in	Modi'in-Maccabim-Re'ut	Lod Municipal Stadium	3,000
Maccabi Akhi Nazareth	Nazareth	Ilut Stadium	4,932
Maccabi Bnei Reineh	Nazareth	Barel Stadium	5,200
Maccabi Herzliya	Herzliya	Herzliya Municipal Stadium	8,100
Maccabi Kiryat Gat	Kiryat Gat	Rehovot Stadium	6,000
Maccabi Jaffa	Tel Aviv	Ness Ziona Stadium	3,000

== Regular season ==
=== League table ===
Pos	Team	Pld	W	D	L	GF	GA	GD	Pts	Advances
1	F.C. Ashdod	13	10	1	2	26	13	+13	31	Advances to the Promotion playoffs
2	Bnei Yehuda	13	9	3	1	29	13	+16	30	Advances to the Promotion playoffs
3	Hapoel Kfar Shalem	13	9	2	2	30	20	+10	29	Advances to the Promotion playoffs
4	Hapoel Ra'anana	13	8	1	4	27	17	+10	25	Advances to the Promotion playoffs
5	Hapoel Afula	13	7	3	3	22	16	+6	24	Advances to the Promotion playoffs
6	F.C. Kiryat Yam	13	7	1	5	34	24	+10	22	Advances to the Promotion playoffs
7	Hapoel Rishon LeZion	13	6	4	3	22	17	+5	22	Advances to the Promotion playoffs
8	Maccabi Bnei Reineh	13	6	3	4	23	16	+7	21	Advances to the Promotion playoffs
9	Hapoel Kfar Saba	13	5	0	8	21	26	−5	15	Advances to the Relegation playoffs
10	Maccabi Kiryat Gat	13	3	5	5	13	15	−2	14	Advances to the Relegation playoffs
11	Maccabi Akhi Nazareth	13	4	2	7	16	23	−7	14	Advances to the Relegation playoffs
12	F.C. Kafr Qasim	13	4	1	8	16	18	−2	13	Advances to the Relegation playoffs
13	Ironi Modi'in	13	3	3	7	19	28	−9	12	Advances to the Relegation playoffs
14	Maccabi Herzliya	13	2	4	7	10	16	−6	10	Advances to the Relegation playoffs
15	Maccabi Jaffa	13	3	0	10	9	27	−18	9	Advances to the Relegation playoffs
16	Hapoel Acre	13	0	3	10	4	32	−28	3	Advances to the Relegation playoffs

Updated to match(es) played on 2 November 2026. Source: Soccerway
Rules for classification: 1) points; 2) goal difference; 3) number of wins; 4) goals scored; 5) head to head; 6) deciding match.

=== Results ===
Home \ Away	ASH	BNY	HKH	HRA	HAF	FKY	HRL	MBR	HKS	MKG	MAN	FKQ	MOD	MHE	MJA	HAC
F.C. Ashdod	—	3–1	4–0		11 Dec		3–2	4 Jan		0–0	4 Dec			1–0	1–0	
Bnei Yehuda		—	3–1			5–1	0–0	14 Dec		2–1	2–1			1–1	7 Dec	1 Jan
Hapoel Kfar Shalem		21 Dec	—	2–1		3–2			27 Nov		3–3	2–0	3–2		3–1	
Hapoel Ra'anana	30 Nov	1–1		—	1 Jan	3–2			6–1	0–1	2–0	1–2		18 Dec		
Hapoel Afula	2–0	30 Nov	3–3	3–2	—		2–2			1–0	18 Dec			0–0	0–1	1–0
F.C. Kiryat Yam	4–0		4 Jan		4 Dec	—		0–1	2–0			2–1	3–2		11 Dec	5–0
Hapoel Rishon LeZion			0–3	1–2		4–2	—		2–0	18 Dec	1–0	2–1	30 Nov		3–0	
Maccabi Bnei Reineh	1–2	1–4	1–2	1–2		18 Dec	1–1	—		27 Nov				1–1		
Hapoel Kfar Saba	2–4	1–2			2–0		11 Dec	1–2	—	2–0			1–4	1 Jan		4 Dec
Maccabi Kiryat Gat			7 Dec			2–2	1–2			—	2–2	0–1	1 Jan	1–1	2–1	11 Dec
Maccabi Akhi Nazareth				14 Dec	0–1	27 Nov		1–2	0–4		—		1–2		1 Jan	1–0
F.C. Kafr Qasim	0–1	0–1	11 Dec		1–3		1 Jan	7 Dec	4–2		2–3	—	0–0			4–0
Ironi Modi'in	1–3	2–4		4 Dec				0–6	21 Dec	1–1			—	0–2		2–2
Maccabi Herzliya			0–1	2–3		1–3	4 Dec		0–2		1–2	1–0	14 Dec	—	0–2	
Maccabi Jaffa	21 Dec					2–6		0–2	0–3		1–2	27 Nov	0–2		—	1–0
Hapoel Acre	0–4	0–3		0–1	0–3		2–2	0–0		0–2		18 Dec		27 Nov		—

Updated to match(es) played on 2 November 2026. Source: Soccerway
Legend: Blue = home team win; Yellow = draw; Red = away team win.

== Position by round ==
Team ╲ Round	1	2	3	4	5	6	7	8	9	10	11	12	13	14	15	16	17	18	19	20	21	22	23	24	25	26	27	28	29	30
F.C. Ashdod	9	11	6	4	4	1	1	1	1	2	1	1	1																	
Bnei Yehuda Tel Aviv	2	1	1	1	1	2	2	2	2	1	2	2	2																	
Hapoel Kfar Shalem	4	10	5	8	8	10	8	7	5	4	3	3	3																	
Hapoel Ra'anana	5	2	4	3	3	4	4	5	7	7	5	4	4																	
Hapoel Afula	3	4	2	5	5	6	5	6	4	6	7	6	5																	
F.C. Kiryat Yam	1	5	9	6	9	7	6	4	6	5	6	7	6																	
Hapoel Rishon LeZion	6	3	3	2	2	3	3	3	3	3	4	5	7																	
Maccabi Bnei Reineh	15	12	13	7	6	5	7	9	9	8	8	8	8																	
Hapoel Kfar Saba	12	15	14	15	10	13	13	15	14	14	10	9	9																	
Maccabi Ironi Kiryat Gat	8	9	8	9	12	9	10	10	11	11	11	12	10																	
Maccabi Akhi Nazareth	14	13	12	13	14	12	12	13	10	12	12	10	11																	
F.C. Kafr Qasim	10	6	10	11	13	11	9	8	8	9	9	11	12																	
Ironi Modi'in	13	7	7	10	11	14	14	11	12	10	13	13	13																	
Maccabi Herzliya	7	8	11	12	7	8	11	12	13	13	14	14	14																	
Maccabi Jaffa	16	14	15	14	15	15	15	14	15	15	15	15	15																	
Hapoel Acre	11	16	16	16	16	16	16	16	16	16	16	16	16																	

Promotion playoffs
Relegation playoffs

== Season statistics ==
=== Top scorers ===
Rank	Player	Club	Goals
1	(Israel) Stav Nachmani	Bnei Yehuda Tel Aviv	12
2	(Israel) Daniel Atlan	Hapoel Ra'anana	8
3	(Nigeria) Ezekiel Henty	Hapoel Rishon LeZion	7
3	(South Africa) Ashley Cupido	F.C. Kiryat Yam	7
3	(Israel) Matan Beit Ya'akov	Hapoel Kfar Shalem	7
3	(Guinea) Sékou Sylla	F.C. Kiryat Yam	7
7	(Israel) Orel Baye	Hapoel Kfar Shalem	6
7	(Israel) Eilon Elimelech	Hapoel Afula	6
7	(Israel) Yuval Sason	Maccabi Bnei Reineh	6
7	(Israel) Yaniv Mizrahi	Hapoel Kfar Shalem	6
7	(Nigeria) Peter Michael	Hapoel Ra'anana	6
12	(Israel) Ahmed Khalaila	Hapoel Afula	5
12	(Israel) Nehoray Dabush	F.C. Ashdod	5
12	(Israel) Amir Sabag	Ironi Modi'in	5
12	(Israel) Roy Buganim	Hapoel Kfar Saba	5

== See also ==
- 2026–27 Israeli Premier League
