= Ariel Sheratzky =

Israeli footballer

Personal information
- Date of birth: 24 September 2001 (age 25)
- Place of birth: Givatayim, Israel
- Height: 1.88 m (6 ft 2 in)
- Position: Attacking midfielder

Team information
- Current team: Ironi Kiryat Shmona
- Number: 10

Youth career
- 2010–2016: Maccabi Tel Aviv
- 2016–2017: Maccabi Netanya
- 2017–2020: Ironi Kiryat Shmona

Senior career*
Years	Team	Apps	(Gls)
2020–	Ironi Kiryat Shmona	100	(10)
- * Club domestic league appearances and goals as of 1 June 2026

Ariel Sheratzky (born 24 September 2001) is an Israeli professional footballer who plays as an attacking midfielder for Israeli Premier League club Ironi Kiryat Shmona.
