= Boni Amian =

Ivorian footballer

Personal information
- Full name: Boni Gontran Benoit Junior Amian
- Date of birth: 29 March 2003 (age 23)
- Place of birth: Vieil-Ousrou, Ivory Coast
- Height: 1.74 m (5 ft 9 in)
- Position: Central midfielder

Team information
- Current team: Hapoel Petah Tikva
- Number: 29

Senior career*
Years	Team	Apps	(Gls)
2023	Saksan		
2024–2025	Khimki	5	(0)
2024	→ Dnepr Mogilev (loan)	9	(0)
2024	→ Dinamo Minsk (loan)	11	(2)
2025–	Hapoel Petah Tikva	25	(1)
- * Club domestic league appearances and goals as of 23 June 2026

Boni Gontran Benoit Junior Amian (born 29 March 2003) is an Ivorian football player who plays as a central midfielder for Israeli club Hapoel Petah Tikva.

== Career ==
Amian signed with Khimki in Russia in January 2024 and was sent on two consecutive loans to Belarusian Premier League clubs Dnepr Mogilev and Dinamo Minsk. He returned from the latter loan and rejoined Khimki in early 2025.

Amian made his Russian Premier League debut for Khimki on 15 March 2025 in a game against Akhmat Grozny.
