= Cédric Don =

Ivorian professional footballer

Cédric Franck Don
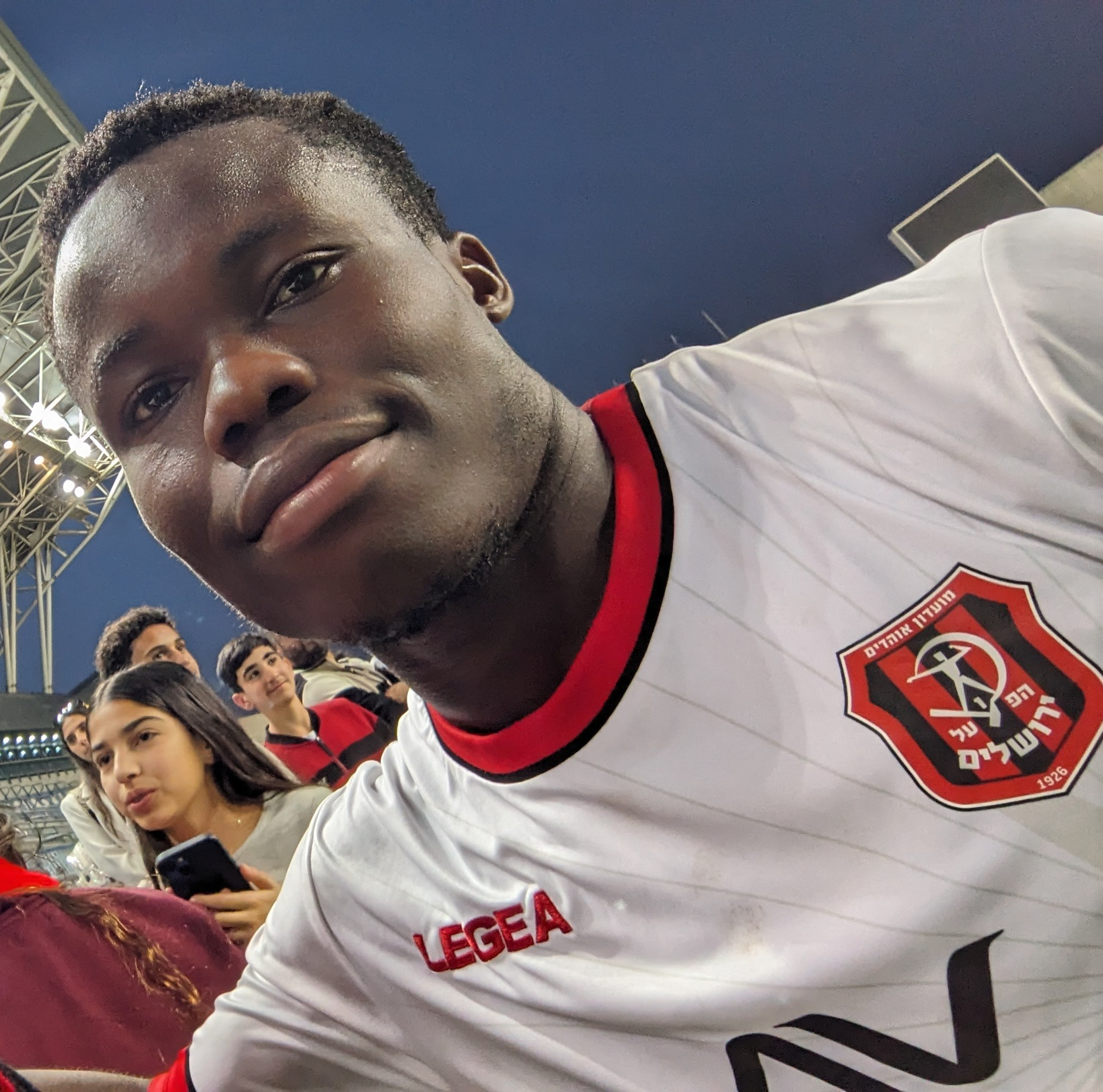
- Don in 2023.

Personal information
- Full name: Cédric Franck Emmanuel Don
- Date of birth: 3 May 2004 (age 22)
- Place of birth: Man, Ivory Coast
- Height: 1.67 m (5 ft 6 in)
- Position: Second striker

Team information
- Current team: Maccabi Haifa
- Number: 45

Youth career
- JC d'Abidjan

Senior career*
Years	Team	Apps	(Gls)
2021–2023	JC d'Abidjan		
2022–2023	→ Hapoel Jerusalem	31	(5)
2023–2026	Hapoel Jerusalem	78	(13)
2026–	Maccabi Haifa	12	(1)

International career
2019	Ivory Coast U16	3	(0)
2020	Ivory Coast U17	3	(0)
- * Club domestic league appearances and goals as of 23 June 2026

Cédric Franck Emmanuel Don (born 3 May 2004) is an Ivorian professional footballer who plays as a second striker for Maccabi Haifa.

== Career ==
=== Club ===
In July 2022, he was loaned to Hapoel Jerusalem with an option to buy. On 20 August 2022, he made his debut in the 1–1 against Hapoel Hadera.

== Career statistics ==
=== Club ===
As of 1 June 2026.

Club	Season	League			Cup		League Cup		Continental		Other		Total	
Club	Season	Division	Apps	Goals	Apps	Goals	Apps	Goals	Apps	Goals	Apps	Goals	Apps	Goals
Hapoel Jerusalem	2022–23	Israeli Premier League	31	5	1	0	4	0	0	0	0	0	36	5
Hapoel Jerusalem	2023–24	Israeli Premier League	30	3	2	0	5	1	0	0	0	0	37	4
Hapoel Jerusalem	2024–25	Israeli Premier League	31	7	1	0	4	0	0	0	0	0	36	7
Hapoel Jerusalem	2025–26	Israeli Premier League	17	3	2	0	5	0	0	0	0	0	24	3
Hapoel Jerusalem	Total		109	18	6	0	18	1	0	0	0	0	133	19
Maccabi Haifa	2025–26	Israeli Premier League	12	1	2	1	0	0	0	0	0	0	14	2
Career total			121	19	8	1	18	1	0	0	0	0	147	21
