= 2025–26 Hapoel Be'er Sheva F.C. season =

Hapoel Be'er Sheva F.C
2025–26 season
- Chairman: Nir Katz
- Manager: (Israel) Ran Kojok
- Stadium: Turner Stadium
- Israeli Premier League: Winners
- UEFA Europa League: First qualifying round
- UEFA Conference League: second qualifying round
- State Cup: Runners Cup
- Toto Cup: Semi Finals
Home colours	Away colours	Third colours

This season will be Hapoel Be'er Sheva F.C 76th season in the clubs history. During this season the club will have competed in the following competitions: Israeli Premier League, UEFA Europa League, UEFA Conference League, State Cup, Toto Cup.

== Current squad ==
As of 15 June 2026

Note: Flags indicate national team as defined under FIFA eligibility rules; some limited exceptions apply. Players may hold more than one non-FIFA nationality.

No.	Pos.	Nation	Player
1	GK	ISR	Ofir Marciano
2	DF	ISR	Guy Mizrahi
3	DF	ISR	Matan Baltaxa
4	DF	ISR	Miguel Vítor (captain)
7	MF	ISR	Eliel Peretz
8	MF	ISR	Mohammed Kna'an
9	FW	ISR	Zahi Ahmed
10	MF	ISR	Dan Bitton
11	MF	ISR	Amir Ganah
13	DF	ISR	Ofir Davidzada
14	FW	JAM	Javon East
17	MF	ZAM	Kings Kangwa
18	DF	ISR	Roy Levy
19	MF	ISR	Shai Elias

No.	Pos.	Nation	Player
22	DF	POR	Hélder Lopes (Vice-captain)
23	MF	ISR	Itay Hazut
25	MF	BRA	Lucas Ventura
27	MF	BUL	Yoni Stoyanov
36	GK	ISR	Yonatan Shani
44	DF	SEN	Djibril Diop
45	FW	ISR	Muhammad Abu Rumi
55	GK	ISR	Niv Eliasi
66	FW	SRB	Igor Zlatanović
70	MF	ISR	Samer Farhud
95	GK	ISR	Itay Hemi
—	DF	ISR	Itay Rotman
—	GK	ARG	Marco Wolff
—	MF	ISR	Niv Yehoshua

== Pre-season and friendlies ==
28 June 2025 Friendly	Hapoel Be'er Sheva (Israel)	4-2	(Poland) Górnik Łęczna	Be'er Sheva
19:00	Miguel Vítor 10'; Kangwa 17'; Lucas Ventura 42'; Almog 83'	Report	Kamil Orlik 30'; Banaszak 62'	Stadium: Turner Stadium

1 July 2025 Friendly	Cracovia (Poland)	1-1	(Israel) Hapoel Be'er Sheva	Kraków
18:00	Wójcik 11'	Report	Kangwa 39'	Stadium: Józef Piłsudski Cracovia Stadium

== Competitions ==
=== Overview ===
Competition	First match	Last match	Starting round	Final position	Record							
Competition	First match	Last match	Starting round	Final position	Pld	W	D	L	GF	GA	GD	Win %
Ligat Ha'Al	24 August 2025	23 May 2026	Matchday 1	Winners	36	24	7	5	79	38	+41	66.67
State Cup	27 December 2025	26 May 2026	Round of 32	Runners Up	5	4	0	1	11	6	+5	80.00
Toto Cup	16 August 2025	16 August 2025	European qualification route	Semi Final	1	0	0	1	0	2	−2	0.00
UEFA Europa League	10 July 2025	17 July 2025	First qualifying round	First qualifying round	2	0	1	1	1	3	−2	0.00
UEFA Conference League	24 July 2025	31 July 2025	Second qualifying round	Second qualifying round	2	0	1	1	0	1	−1	0.00
Total					46	28	9	9	91	50	+41	60.87

Last updated: 23 May 2026
Source: Competitions

=== Israeli Premier League ===
==== Regular season table ====
Pos	Team	Pld	W	D	L	GF	GA	GD	Pts	Qualification
1	Hapoel Be'er Sheva	26	18	5	3	58	25	+33	59	Qualification for the Championship round
2	Beitar Jerusalem	26	17	6	3	61	29	+32	57	Qualification for the Championship round
3	Maccabi Tel Aviv	26	14	7	5	55	32	+23	49	Qualification for the Championship round
4	Hapoel Tel Aviv	26	15	6	5	46	26	+20	49 (Note: Hapoel Tel Aviv had 2 points deducted following riot in Maccabi Tel Aviv match.)	Qualification for the Championship round
5	Maccabi Haifa	26	11	9	6	50	28	+22	42	Qualification for the Championship round

Source: Soccerway
Rules for classification: 1) Points; 2) Goal difference; 3) Matches won; 4) Goals scored; 5) Head-to-head points; 6) Head-to-head goal difference; 7) Head-to-head goals scored; 8) Play-off.

=== Regular season matches ===
24 August 2025 1	Maccabi Netanya	2-4	Hapoel Be'er Sheva	Netanya
20:15	Oz Bilu 9' 20'; Plakuschenko (yellow card) 27'; Karem Jaber (yellow card) 55'; Levi (red card) 78'; Tavares (yellow card) 90'	Report	Ahmed 33' 63'; Biton 43' (pen.); Karem Jaber 45' (o.g.); Peretz (yellow card) 85'; Eliasi (yellow card) 90'	Stadium: Netanya Stadium; Attendance: 8,809; Referee: (Israel) Sapir Berman

30 August 2025 2	Hapoel Be'er Sheva	7-0	Ironi Tiberias	Be'er Sheva
20:30	Kangwa 2' 7'; Zlatanović 18' 83'; Biton 26'; Lopes 53'; Ahmed 58'; Mizrahi (yellow card) 65'	Report	Sambinha (red card) 15'; Muhammed (yellow card) 37'; Omer Itzhak (yellow card) 67'	Stadium: Turner Stadium; Attendance: 12,400; Referee: (Israel) Odeh Na'al

14 September 2025 3	Hapoel Jerusalem	1-5	Hapoel Be'er Sheva	Jerusalem
20:15	Madmon (yellow card) 37'; Badash 60'; Ido Oli (yellow card) 83'	Report	Lucas Ventura (yellow card) 2'; Biton 6' 55' 86' (yellow card) 78'; Blorian (yellow card) 25'; Mizrahi 28'; Lopes (yellow card) 66'; Davidzada (yellow card) 81'; Nadav Zamir 90+3' (o.g.)	Stadium: Teddy Stadium; Attendance: 11,034; Referee: (Israel) Ohad Asulin

21 September 2025 4	Hapoel Be'er Sheva	3-1	Bnei Sakhnin	Be'er Sheva
20:00	Bručić 3' (o.g.); Biton 15'; Peretz 45+2'; Blorian (yellow card) 62'	Report	Jubayer Bushnak 19' (yellow card) 26'; Shamir (yellow card) 47'; Hilu (yellow card) 78'	Stadium: Turner Stadium; Attendance: 14,010; Referee: (Israel) Dekel Tzino

29 September 2025 5	Maccabi Haifa	0-1	Hapoel Be'er Sheva	Haifa
20:30	Eissat (yellow card) 61'; Kasa (yellow card) 69'	Report	Mizrahi (yellow card) 45+1'; Biton 62'; Kangwa (yellow card) 72'; Peretz (yellow card) 85'	Stadium: Sammy Ofer Stadium; Attendance: 28,880; Referee: (Israel) Aviad Shiloach

4 October 2025 6	Hapoel Be'er Sheva	2-1	Hapoel Tel Aviv	Be'er Sheva
20:00	Davidzada 6'; Baltaxa (yellow card) 16'; Mizrahi (yellow card) 25'; Kangwa (yellow card) 32'; Biton 73' (pen.); Elias (yellow card) 90+2'	Report	Turiel 9'; Falcão (yellow card) 48'; Chico (yellow card) 57'; Kraev (yellow card) 71'; Xande Silva (yellow card) 78'; Altman (yellow card) 80'; Leidner (yellow card) 88'	Stadium: Turner Stadium; Attendance: 15,104; Referee: (Israel) David Fuxman

18 October 2025 7	Ironi Kiryat Shmona	1-0	Hapoel Be'er Sheva	Kiryat Shmona
19:30	Ovadia Darwish (yellow card) 42'; Bangoura (yellow card) 43'; Ugarriza 90+7' (yellow card) 90+5' (yellow-red card) 90+8'	Report	Lucas Ventura (yellow card) 76'; Roy Levy (yellow card) 90+6'	Stadium: Netanya Stadium; Attendance: 4.148; Referee: (Israel) Gal Leibovitz

26 October 2025 8	Hapoel Be'er Sheva	1-0	Maccabi Bnei Reineh	Be'er Sheva
20:15	Lopes (yellow card) 14' (goal) 30'; Kangwa (yellow card) 43'; Blorian (yellow card) 59'	Report	Zé Turbo (yellow card) 62'; Kwabena (yellow card) 86'	Stadium: Turner Stadium; Attendance: 12,794; Referee: (Israel) Gal Levi

3 November 2025 9	Beitar Jerusalem	0-1	Hapoel Be'er Sheva	Jerusalem
20:30	Roey Elimelech (yellow card) 2'; Brayan Carabalí (yellow card) 16'	Report	Zlatanović (yellow card) 4'; Biton 47'; Ganah (yellow card) 60'; Eliasi (yellow card) 72'; Ahmed (yellow card) 87'	Stadium: Teddy Stadium; Attendance: 27,303; Referee: (Israel) David Fuxman

8 November 2025 10	Hapoel Be'er Sheva	2-2	Ashdod	Be'er Sheva
19:30	Lucas Ventura (yellow card) 26'; Kangwa 61' (pen.) (yellow card) 90+8'; Lopes 90+5'	Report	Tamam (yellow card) 44'; Kimvuidi 66'; Ansah 90+3'; Mohammed Amer (yellow card) 90+4'	Stadium: Turner Stadium; Attendance: 14,189; Referee: (Israel) Odeh Na'al

=== Championship round ===
==== Championship round table ====
Pos	Team	Pld	W	D	L	GF	GA	GD	Pts	Qualification	HBS	BEI	MTA	HTA	MHA	HPT
1	Hapoel Be'er Sheva (C)	36	24	7	5	79	38	+41	79	Qualification for the Champions League second qualifying round	—	2–2	4–2	2–0	2–5	3–0
2	Beitar Jerusalem	36	22	10	4	78	40	+38	76	Qualification for the Conference League second qualifying round	1–1	—	4–2	1–1	3–0	3–1
3	Maccabi Tel Aviv	36	19	9	8	72	46	+26	66	Qualification for the Europa League second qualifying round (Note: The 2025–26 Israel State Cup winners (Maccabi Tel Aviv) qualify for the Europa League second qualifying round.)	1–0	1–2	—	1–0	3–0	4–0
4	Hapoel Tel Aviv	36	18	8	10	55	35	+20	60 (Note: Hapoel Tel Aviv had 2 points deducted following riot in Maccabi Tel Aviv match.)	Qualification for the Conference League second qualifying round	0–2	0–1	1–1	—	4–0	1–0
5	Maccabi Haifa	36	15	10	11	66	47	+19	55		0–1	3–0	1–3	4–1	—	1–1

Source: Soccerway
Legend: Blue = home team win; Yellow = draw; Red = away team win.
Rules for classification: 1) Points; 2) Points in regular season; 3) Head-to-head points in regular season; 4) Head-to-head goal difference in regular season; 5) Head-to-head goals scored in regular season; 6) Head-to-head away goals scored in regular season (if two teams tied); 7) Goal difference; 8) Goals scored; 9) Fair play ranking; 10) Drawing of lots.
(C) Champions

==== Results summary ====
Overall								Home						Away					
Pld	W	D	L	GF	GA	GD	Pts	W	D	L	GF	GA	GD	W	D	L	GF	GA	GD
36	24	7	5	79	38	+41	79	12	5	1	42	19	+23	12	2	4	37	19	+18

Last updated: 23 May 2026.
Source: Competitive matches

==== Results by round ====
Round	1	2	3	4	5	6	7	8	9	10
Ground	A	H	A	H	A	H	A	H	A	H
Result	W	W	W	W	W	W	L	W	W	D
Position	3	1	1	1	1	1	1	1	1	1

Updated to match(es) played on 8 November 2025. Source: Competitive Matches
A = Away; H = Home; W = Win; D = Draw; L = Loss

=== Toto Cup Al ===
16 August 2025 Semi-finals	Hapoel Be'er Sheva	0–2	Hapoel Tel Aviv	Be'er Sheva
20:30	Biton (yellow card) 58'; Lucas Ventura (yellow card) 70'; Lopes (yellow card) 90+8'	Report	Rotman 38'; Amit Lemkin 66'; Kraev (yellow card) 70'; Alkukin (yellow card) 82'; Tzur (yellow card) 90+3'	Stadium: Turner Stadium

== First qualifying round ==
10 July 2025 First qualifying round First Leg	Levski Sofia (Bulgaria)	0–0	(Israel) Hapoel Be'er Sheva	Sofia
20:30	Kostadinov (yellow card) 37'; Maicon (yellow card) 45+3' (yellow-red card) 70'; Velázquez (yellow card) 87'	Report	Miguel Vítor (yellow card) 34'; Mizrahi (yellow card) 57'; Peretz (yellow card) 67' (yellow-red card) 90+5'; Ahmed (yellow card) 90+1'	Stadium: Stadion Georgi Asparuhov; Attendance: 15,467; Referee: (Czech Republic) Ladislav Szikszay

17 July 2025 First qualifying round Second Leg	Hapoel Be'er Sheva (Israel)	1–1 (1–1 agg.) (1–3 p)	(Bulgaria) Levski Sofia	Nyíregyháza
20:00	Lucas Ventura (yellow card) 61' (yellow-red card) 109'; Kangwa (yellow card) 80'; Turgeman 105+3'; Miguel Vítor (yellow card) 111'	Report	Neves (yellow card) 59'; Sangaré 114'	Stadium: Városi Stadion; Attendance: 721; Referee: (Germany) Florian Badstübner

== UEFA Conference League ==
=== Second qualifying round ===
24 July 2025 First Leg	AEK Athens (Greece)	1–0	(Israel) Hapoel Be'er Sheva	Athens
21:00	Pereyra (yellow card) 42'; Relvas 50'; Ljubičić (yellow card) 69'; Pilios (yellow card) 78'; Nikolić (yellow card) 80'	Report	Zlatanović (yellow card) 3'; Elias (yellow card) 67'; Garita (yellow card) 85'	Stadium: Agia Sophia Stadium; Attendance: 21,123; Referee: (Italy) Luca Pairetto

31 July 2025 Second Leg	Hapoel Be'er Sheva (Israel)	0–0 (0–1 agg.)	(Greece) AEK Athens	Debrecen
20:00	Blorian (yellow card) 30'; Baltaxa (yellow card) 57'	Report	Koïta (yellow card) 2'	Stadium: Nagyerdei Stadion; Attendance: 431; Referee: (Switzerland) Urs Schnyder
