= Or Blorian =

Israeli footballer (born 2000)

Personal information
- Full name: Or Blorian
- Date of birth: 7 March 2000 (age 26)
- Place of birth: Petah Tikva, Israel
- Height: 1.88 m (6 ft 2 in)
- Position: Centre-back

Team information
- Current team: Sporting Kansas City
- Number: 5

Youth career
- 2008–2019: Maccabi Petah Tikva

Senior career*
Years	Team	Apps	(Gls)
2019–2022	Maccabi Petah Tikva	75	(1)
2022–2026	Hapoel Be'er Sheva	68	(2)
2023–2024	→ Hapoel Tel Aviv	28	(3)
2026–	Sporting Kansas City	1	(0)

International career^{‡}
2016	Israel U16	9	(0)
2016–2017	Israel U17	15	(0)
2017	Israel U18	2	(0)
2018–2019	Israel U19	6	(0)
2020–2023	Israel U21	17	(0)
2025–	Israel	5	(0)
- * Club domestic league appearances and goals as of 15:45, 29 May 2026 (UTC) ‡ National team caps and goals as of 20:00, 3 June 2026 (UTC)

Or Blorian (Hebrew: אור בלוריאן; born 7 March 2000) is an Israeli professional footballer who plays as a centre-back for Major League Soccer club Sporting Kansas City and the Israel national team.

== Early life ==
Blorian was born in Petah Tikva, Israel, to a Sephardic Jewish family.

== Club career ==
=== Maccabi Petah Tikva ===
Blorian was born in Petah Tikva and grew up in the Maccabi Petah Tikva youth academy. He made 16 appearances for the club during the 2019–20 season, in which the team played in the Liga Leumit. At the end of the season, the club was promoted to the Israeli Premier League. On August 30, 2020, Blorian made his Premier League debut in a 2–1 victory over Maccabi Tel Aviv on the opening matchday of the 2020–21 season. On December 12, he scored his first goal for the club in a 3–2 loss to Maccabi Netanya on Matchday 10. During the 2020–21 season. Blorian made 36 league appearances and scored one goal.

=== Hapoel Be'er Sheva ===
On 14 September 2022, Blorian signed a four-year contract with Hapoel Be'er Sheva. On 17 October, Blorian made his debut for Hapoel Be'er Sheva, coming on as a substitute in the 74th minute in a 1–1 draw against Sektzia Ness Ziona in the Israeli Premier League. During the 2022–23 Israeli Premier League season, Blorian made a total of 6 appearances and finished the season with his team in second place.

Loan to Hapoel Tel Aviv

On 5 July 2023, Blorian was loaned to Hapoel Tel Aviv for one season with an option to buy. On 29 July 2023, Blorian made his debut for Hapoel Tel Aviv in a 1–1 draw against Hapoel Jerusalem at Teddy Stadium in the Toto Cup. On 5 August, Blorian scored his first goal for Hapoel Tel Aviv in a 1–1 draw against Hapoel Petah Tikva at Bloomfield Stadium in the Toto Cup. On 26 August, Blorian made his debut for Hapoel Tel Aviv in a 1–1 draw against Bnei Sakhnin in the Israeli Premier League at Doha Stadium. On 5 December, Blorian scored his first goal for Hapoel Tel Aviv in a 2–1 loss to Ashdod in the Israeli Premier League at Yud-Alef Stadium. At the end of the season, Blorian was relegated with Hapoel Tel Aviv to the Liga Leumit, and the club decided not to exercise the option to buy.

Return from loan

Ahead of the 2024/2025 season, Blorian returned to Hapoel Be'er Sheva, being included in coach Ran Kozuch professional plans. On 20 July 2024, he made his renewed debut for Hapoel Be'er Sheva, starting in a 0–3 loss to Maccabi Haifa in the Toto Cup at Sammy Ofer Stadium. On 25 July, Blorian made his debut for the club in the UEFA Conference Leaguee, in a draw against Cherno More at Gradski Stadium. On 26 August, he made his renewed Israeli Premier League debut for Hapoel Be'er Sheva in a 1–0 win against Ironi Kiryat Shmona at Kiryat Shmona Municipal Stadium. Blorian won the Israel State Cup with Hapoel Be'er Sheva that season, following a 2–0 victory over Beitar Jerusalem at Bloomfield Stadium. In the Israeli Premier League, he finishing the season with his team in second place after a long legal saga involving the Israel Football Association. Following the “Turner events”, the association's disciplinary court ruled a one-point deduction and recorded a 0–0 draw with no points awarded in the match against Bnei Sakhnin at Turner Stadium.

Hapoel Be'er Sheva exercised its option on Blorian, and he will remain with the club for the upcoming season. Blorian, who returned from a loan spell at Hapoel Tel Aviv, has become an important part of coach Ran Kozuch rotation. Blorian began the 2025–26 season by winning the Israeli Super Cup, following a 2–1 victory over Maccabi Tel Aviv at Bloomfield Stadium. However, he and his team were eliminated from European competitions after being knocked out by the Bulgarian side Levski Sofia in the UEFA Europa League path and by AEK Athens from Greece in the UEFA Conference League. In addition, he and his team lost 2–0 to Hapoel Tel Aviv in the Toto Cup semi-final at Turner Stadium.

== International career ==
On March 18, 2021, Blorian was called up to the Israel national team for the first time by coach Willibald Ruttensteiner ahead of the match against Denmark national team in the 2022 FIFA World Cup qualifiers.

Ahead of the two matches against Moldova national team and Italy national team in the 2026 FIFA World Cup qualifiers, Blorian was called up to the Israel national team by coach Ran Ben Shimon. However, he did not feature in either match and remained on the bench for both games.

On September 30, 2025, Blorian was called up to the Israel national team by coach Ran Ben Shimon ahead of the matches against Norway national team and Italy national team in the 2026 FIFA World Cup qualifiers. On October 11, 2025, Blorian made his debut for the Israel national team in a 0–5 loss to Norway national team at Ullevaal Stadion. On October 14, Blorian appeared in Israel national team 0–3 loss to Italy national team at the Friuli Stadium.

== Career statistics ==
As of 1 June 2023

Club	Season	League			State Cup		Toto Cup		Continental		Other		Total	
Club	Season	Division	Apps	Goals	Apps	Goals	Apps	Goals	Apps	Goals	Apps	Goals	Apps	Goals
Maccabi Petah Tikva	2019–20	Liga Leumit	16	0	4	0	1	0	0	0	0	0	21	0
Maccabi Petah Tikva	2020–21	Israeli Premier League	36	1	2	0	4	0	0	0	0	0	42	1
Maccabi Petah Tikva	2021–22	Israeli Premier League	23	0	2	0	4	0	0	0	0	0	29	0
Maccabi Petah Tikva	Total		75	1	8	0	9	0	0	0	0	0	92	1
Hapoel Be'er Sheva	2022–23	Israeli Premier League	6	0	0	0	1	0	0	0	0	0	7	0
Hapoel Be'er Sheva	2024–25	Israeli Premier League	0	0	0	0	0	0	0	0	0	0	0	0
Hapoel Be'er Sheva	Total		6	0	0	0	1	0	0	0	0	0	7	0
Hapoel Tel Aviv (loan)	2023–24	Israeli Premier League	28	3	1	0	5	1	0	0	0	0	34	4
Hapoel Tel Aviv (loan)	Total		0	0	0	0	0	0	0	0	0	0	0	0
Career total			81	1	8	0	10	0	0	0	0	0	99	1

== Honours ==
Hapoel Beer Sheva

- Israeli Premier League: 2025–26
- Israel State Cup: 2024–25
- Israel Super Cup: 2025
