= Dan Biton (footballer) =

Israeli footballer

Personal information
- Date of birth: 20 July 1995 (age 31)
- Place of birth: Be'er Sheva, Israel
- Height: 1.75 m (5 ft 9 in)
- Position: Forward

Team information
- Current team: Hapoel Be'er Sheva
- Number: 10

Youth career
- 2005–2008: Maccabi Be'er Sheva
- 2008–2015: Hapoel Be'er Sheva

Senior career*
Years	Team	Apps	(Gls)
2014–2017	Hapoel Be'er Sheva	11	(0)
2016–2017	→ Ashdod (loan)	27	(3)
2017–2019	Ashdod	55	(8)
2019–2021	Ludogorets Razgrad	21	(5)
2020–2021	→ Maccabi Tel Aviv (loan)	28	(4)
2021–2024	Maccabi Tel Aviv	62	(11)
2024–	Hapoel Be'er Sheva	57	(26)

International career^{‡}
2024–	Israel	14	(2)
- * Club domestic league appearances and goals as of 20:26, 20 May 2026 (UTC) ‡ National team caps and goals as of 20:26, 20 May 2026 (UTC)

Dan Biton (or Bitton; Hebrew: דן ביטון; born 20 July 1995) is an Israeli professional footballer who plays as a forward for Israeli Premier League club Hapoel Be'er Sheva and the Israel national team.

== Early life ==
Biton was born in Be'er Sheva, Israel, to a family of Sephardic Jewish descent.

== Club career ==
=== Hapoel Be'er Sheva ===
On 2 September 2014, 2014–15 season, Biton made his senior debut in a 0–0 draw against Maccabi Petah Tikva in the Toto Cup, held at the Vasermil Stadium. That season, Biton began training with the senior squad, but played primarily for the youth team, making only a single appearance in the Toto Cup.

In the 2015–16 season, Biton became an integral part of the senior team squad. On 16 September 2015, Biton made his first appearance of the season in the Toto Cup, a 0–2 loss to Maccabi Netanya at the Netanya Stadium. On 25 September, Biton made his Israeli Premier League debut, starting in a 0–1 loss to Hapoel Acre. On 13 December, Biton assisted John Ogu 90th-minute winning goal in a 2–1 league victory over Ironi Kiryat Shmona. On 2 March 2016, Biton scored the first goal of his career in a 2–0 win over Beitar Tel Aviv Ramla in the State Cup quarter-finals. In total, Biton made 14 appearances in all competitions that season and contributed to the club first championship after 40 years.

In the 2016–17 season, Biton began the campaign with Hapoel Be'er Sheva. On 30 July, he made his first appearance of the season in a Toto Cup match against Hapoel Ashkelon, in which he also scored his debut goal for the club in a 5–0 victory at the Haberfeld Stadium in Rishon LeZion. On 27 August, Biton made his first league appearance of the season in a 0–0 draw against Hapoel Tel Aviv at the HaMoshava Stadium, coming on as a substitute in the 73rd minute.

Loan to F.C. Ashdod

On 7 September 2016, Biton joined F.C. Ashdod on loan with a purchase option, as part of the deal that brought Michael Ohana to Hapoel Be'er Sheva. Four days later, he made his debut for the club, starting in a 0–0 draw against Hapoel Ashkelon. In his second appearance, he scored his first goal for F.C. Ashdod in a 1–3 loss to Hapoel Haifa, and finished the season with three league goals.

=== F.C. Ashdod ===
On 15 August 2017, F.C. Ashdod exercised the purchase option in Biton contract, and he signed a four-year deal with the club.

=== Ludogorets Razgrad ===
On 30 May 2019, ahead of the 2019–20 season, Biton agreed to a three-year contract with Ludogorets Razgrad, the Bulgarian First League, for a transfer fee of €1.25 million. On 3 July 2019, Biton made his official debut for the club in a 2–0 victory in the Bulgarian Supercup. On 20 July, Biton recorded his first assist for Ludogorets Razgrad in a 4–2 win over Beroe Stara Zagora at the Stadion Beroe. On 18 August, Biton scored his first goal for Ludogorets Razgrad in a 2–1 victory over Cherno More at the Stadion Ticha. That season, Biton made 21 league appearances, scoring five goals and providing two assists, and won the Bulgarian First League title with Ludogorets Razgrad.

Loan to Maccabi Tel Aviv

On 16 August 2020, ahead of the 2020–21 season, Biton joined Maccabi Tel Aviv on a one-year loan from Ludogorets Razgrad, with a purchase option set at €1.2 million. On 29 November, Biton scored his first league goal for Maccabi Tel Aviv in a 3–0 victory over Hapoel Kfar Saba. At the start of the season, Biton received regular playing time under head coach Georgios Donis and featured in the starting lineup. During the campaign, Donis was replaced by Patrick van Leeuwen, who gave Biton fewer opportunities. Biton finished the season with four goals, and at its conclusion won the Israel State Cup with the club, coming on as a substitute during extra time in the 2–1 final win over Hapoel Tel Aviv.

=== Maccabi Tel Aviv ===
Ahead of the 2021–22 season, Maccabi Tel Aviv sought to retain Biton, and after a complicated negotiation process, all disputes between the sides were resolved. The original purchase option, which had not been exercised, stood at €1.2 million. Ludogorets Razgrad initially agreed to lower the price to €1 million, and talks stalled at that point for an extended period. The final transfer fee was set at €700,000 – half a million less than the original option. However, the agreement included performance-based bonuses for Ludogorets Razgrad, bringing the total potential value of the deal to €1 million. These bonuses would be paid if Maccabi Tel Aviv qualified for the UEFA Conference League group stage that season or won the Israeli Premier League title.

=== The return to Hapoel Be'er Sheva ===
On September 18, 2024, Biton returned to Hapoel Be'er Sheva. About three days later, he made his first official appearance since rejoining the club in a 2–1 victory over Hapoel Hadera, as part of the fourth round of the 2024–25 season. Biton won the Israel State Cup with Hapoel Be'er Sheva that season, following a 2–0 victory over Beitar Jerusalem at Bloomfield Stadium. In the Israeli Premier League, he scored 11 goals and provided 8 assists, finishing the season with his team in second place after a long legal saga involving the Israel Football Association. Following the “Turner events”, the association's disciplinary court ruled a one-point deduction and recorded a 0–0 draw with no points awarded in the match against Bnei Sakhnin at Turner Stadium.

Biton began the 2025–26 season by winning the Israeli Super Cup, following a 2–1 victory over Maccabi Tel Aviv at Bloomfield Stadium. However, he and his team were eliminated from European competitions after being knocked out by the Bulgarian side Levski Sofia in the UEFA Europa League path and by AEK Athens from Greece in the UEFA Conference League. In addition, he and his team lost 2–0 to Hapoel Tel Aviv in the Toto Cup semi-final at Turner Stadium.

== International career ==
On 2 October 2020, Biton received his first call-up to the Israel national team by head coach Willibald Ruttensteiner ahead of the crucial Euro 2020 qualifying playoff match against Scotland national team, but was released after contracting COVID-19.

Ahead of the friendly matches against Hungary national team and Belarus national team, Biton was called up to the Israel national team by head coach Ran Ben Shimon. On 8 June 2024, Biton made his senior debut for Israel in a 3–0 loss to Hungary national team at the Nagyerdei Stadion. On 11 June, he provided his first assist for the national team in a 4–0 win over Belarus national team at the Szusza Ferenc Stadion. On 6 June 2025, Biton scored two goals for the Israel national team in a 3–1 victory over Estonia national team at the A. Le Coq Arena.

== Career statistics ==
=== Club ===
As of 1 June 2022

Club performance			League		Cup		Continental		Other		Total	
Club	League	Season	Apps	Goals	Apps	Goals	Apps	Goals	Apps	Goals	Apps	Goals
Israel			League		State Cup		Europe		Other (Note: Includes Toto Cup matches.)		Total	
Hapoel Be'er Sheva	Premier League	2014–15	0	0	0	0	0	0	1	0	0	0
Hapoel Be'er Sheva	Premier League	2015–16	10	0	1	1	0	0	3	0	14	1
Hapoel Be'er Sheva	Premier League	2016–17	1	0	0	0	0	0	3	1	4	1
Hapoel Be'er Sheva	Total		11	0	1	1	0	0	7	1	19	2
F.C. Ashdod (loan)	Premier League	2016–17	27	3	4	0	–		2	0	33	3
F.C. Ashdod	Premier League	2017–18	23	3	4	0	–		2	0	29	3
F.C. Ashdod	Premier League	2018–19	32	5	2	1	–		5	1	39	7
F.C. Ashdod	Total		82	11	10	1	0	0	9	1	101	13
Bulgaria			League		Bulgarian Cup		Europe		Other (Note: Includes Bulgarian Supercup matches.)		Total	
Ludogorets Razgrad	First League	2019–20	21	5	2	0	10	1	1	0	34	6
Ludogorets Razgrad	Total		21	5	2	0	10	1	1	0	34	6
Maccabi Tel Aviv (loan)	Premier League	2020–21	28	4	3	0	12	3	1	0	44	7
Maccabi Tel Aviv	Premier League	2021–22	21	2	2	0	6	1	0	0	29	3
Maccabi Tel Aviv	Total		49	6	5	0	18	4	1	0	73	10
Career statistics			166	22	18	2	28	5	18	2	227	31

=== International ===
As of match played 6 June 2025

Appearances and goals by national team and year
National team	Year	Apps	Goals
Israel	2024	4	0
Israel	2025	9	2
Total		13	2

Scores and results list Israel's goal tally first, score column indicates score after each Biton goal

List of international goals scored by Dan Biton
No.	Date	Venue	Cap	Opponent	Score	Result	Competition
1	6 June 2025	Lilleküla Stadium, Tallinn, Estonia	7	Estonia	1–1	3–1	2026 FIFA World Cup qualification
2	6 June 2025	Lilleküla Stadium, Tallinn, Estonia	7	Estonia	2–1	3–1	2026 FIFA World Cup qualification

== Honours ==
Hapoel Beer Sheva

- Israeli Premier League: 2015–16, 2025–26
- Israel State Cup: 2024–25
- Israel Super Cup: 2016, 2025

Ludogorets

- Bulgarian First League: 2019–20
- Bulgarian Supercup: 2019

Maccabi Tel Aviv

- Israeli Premier League: 2023–24
- Israel State Cup: 2021–22
- Toto Cup: 2020-21, 2023–24
- Israel Super Cup: 2024

== See also ==
- Hapoel Be'er Sheva F.C.
- F.C. Ashdod
- PFC Ludogorets Razgrad
- Maccabi Tel Aviv F.C.
- Israel national football team
- Israeli Premier League
- Israel State Cup
- Israeli Super Cup
- Bulgarian Supercup
- UEFA Europa League
- UEFA Conference League
