= Shay Elias =

Israeli footballer

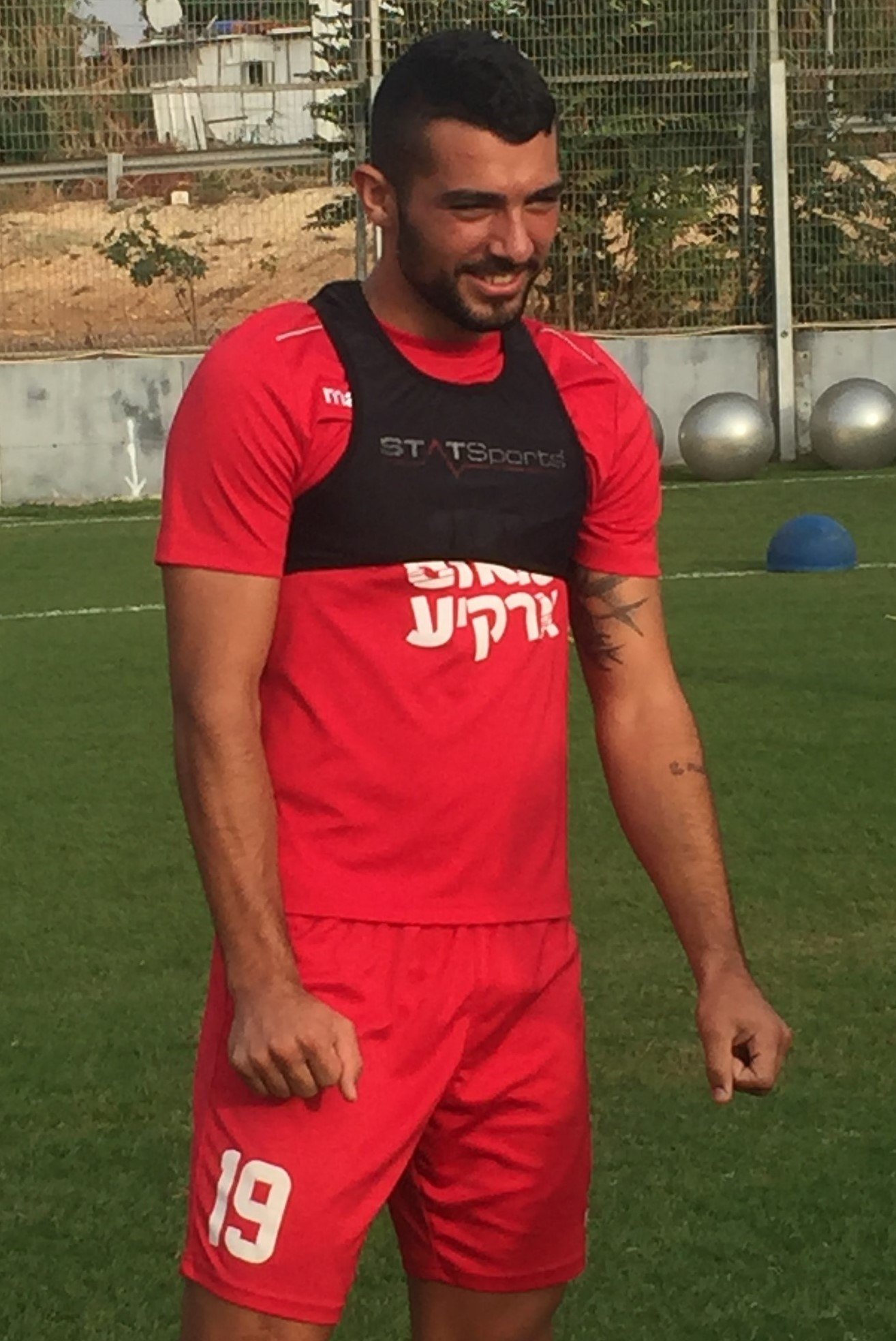
- Elias in 2018

Personal information
- Date of birth: 25 February 1999 (age 27)
- Place of birth: Herzliya, Israel
- Height: 1.85 m (6 ft 1 in)
- Position: Midfielder

Team information
- Current team: Hapoel Be'er Sheva
- Number: 19

Youth career
- 2007–2019: Hapoel Tel Aviv
- 2012–2013: → Hapoel Ramat HaSharon

Senior career*
Years	Team	Apps	(Gls)
2016–2022	Hapoel Tel Aviv	95	(3)
2019–2020	→ Sektzia Ness Ziona	16	(0)
2022–2026	Hapoel Be'er Sheva	91	(3)
2026–	Hapoel Haifa	0	(0)

International career^{‡}
2017	Israel U19	1	(0)
2019–2021	Israel U21	6	(1)
2022–	Israel	1	(0)
- * Club domestic league appearances and goals as of 03:26, 9 August 2026 (UTC) ‡ National team caps and goals as of 15:48, 29 May 2026 (UTC)

Shay Elias (Hebrew: שי אליאס; born 25 February 1999) is an Israeli professional footballer who plays as a midfielder for Israeli Premier League club Hapoel Haifa and the Israel national team.

== Early life ==
Elias was born and raised in Herzliya, Israel, to an Israeli family of Sephardi Jewish descent.

== Career statistics ==
=== Club ===
As of 1 June 2024

Appearances and goals by club, season and competition
Club	Season	League			National Cup		League Cup		Continental		Other		Total	
Club	Season	Division	Apps	Goals	Apps	Goals	Apps	Goals	Apps	Goals	Apps	Goals	Apps	Goals
Hapoel Tel Aviv	2016–17	Israeli Premier League	9	0	2 (Note: Appearances in the Israel State Cup)	0	0	0	–		0	0	11	0
Hapoel Tel Aviv	2017–18	Liga Leumit	8	0	0	0	0	0	–		0	0	8	0
Hapoel Tel Aviv	2018–19	Israeli Premier League	21	0	1	0	3 (Note: Appearances in the Toto Cup)	0	–		0	0	25	0
Hapoel Tel Aviv	2020–21	Israeli Premier League	28	1	4	0	0	0	–		0	0	32	1
Hapoel Tel Aviv	2021–22	Israeli Premier League	29	2	0	0	5	1	–		0	0	34	3
Hapoel Tel Aviv	Total		95	3	7	0	8	1	0	0	0	0	110	4
Sektzia Ness Ziona (loan)	2019–20	Israeli Premier League	16	0	0	0	0	0	–		0	0	16	0
Sektzia Ness Ziona (loan)	Total		16	0	0	0	0	0	0	0	0	0	16	0
Hapoel Be'er Sheva	2022–23	Israeli Premier League	24	1	1	0	2	0	8	0	1	0	36	1
Hapoel Be'er Sheva	2023–24	Israeli Premier League	28	0	3	0	1	0	4	1	0	0	36	1
Hapoel Be'er Sheva	2024–25	Israeli Premier League	0	0	0	0	0	0	0	0	0	0	0	0
Hapoel Be'er Sheva	Total		52	1	4	0	3	0	12	1	1	0	72	2
Career total			163	4	11	0	11	1	12	1	1	0	198	6

== Honours ==
Hapoel Be'er Sheva

- Israeli Premier League: 2025–26
- Israel State Cup: 2024–25
- Israel Super Cup: 2022, 2025

== See also ==
- List of Jewish footballers
- List of Jews in sports
- List of Israelis
