= Amir Ganah =

Israeli association footballer (born 2004)

Personal information
- Full name: Amir Haim Ganah
- Date of birth: 7 September 2004 (age 22)
- Place of birth: Be'er Sheva, Israel
- Height: 1.75 m (5 ft 9 in)
- Position: Attacking midfielder

Team information
- Current team: Hapoel Be'er Sheva
- Number: 11

Youth career
- 2016–2023: Hapoel Be'er Sheva

Senior career*
Years	Team	Apps	(Gls)
2023–	Hapoel Be'er Sheva	109	(12)

International career^{‡}
2023–	Israel U21	7	(0)
2025–	Israel	2	(0)
- * Club domestic league appearances and goals as of 01:35, 19 November 2026 (UTC) ‡ National team caps and goals as of 20:29, 20 May 2026 (UTC)

Amir Chaim Ganah (or Haim Ganach, Hebrew: אמיר חיים גנאח; born 7 September 2004) is an Israeli professional footballer who plays as an attacking midfielder for Israeli Premier League club Hapoel Be'er Sheva and the Israel national team.

== Early life ==
Ganah was born and raised in Be'er Sheva, Israel, to an Israeli family of both Sephardi Jewish and Mizrahi Jewish descent.

== Club career ==
=== Hapoel Be'er Sheva ===
Ganah grew up in the youth department of Hapoel Be'er Sheva. On May 15, 2023, Season 2022–23, he made his debut in a 3–0 loss to Maccabi Tel Aviv at Bloomfield Stadium.

On July 27, 2023, Season 2023–24, Ganah made his debut as part of the UEFA Europa Conference League, winning 0–1 at the Turner Stadium against FK Panevėžys from A Lyga. On August 20, 2023, Season 2023–24, Ganah made his debut in the Toto Cup in a 4–1 loss to Maccabi Netanya at Netanya Stadium.

== International career ==
On 3 September 2023, Ganah was called up to the Israel national under-21 team, ahead of its 2025 UEFA European Under-21 Championship qualification three away matches. He then made his debut with the Israeli U21 squad on 12 September 2023, in a 1–0 away loss to Bulgaria U21.

== Career statistics ==
=== Club ===
As of 30 September 2023

Appearances and goals by club, season and competition
Club	Season	League			National cup		League cup (Note: Includes the Israel Toto Cup (Ligat Ha'Al))		Continental (Europe) (Note: Appearance(s) in UEFA Europa Conference League)		Other		Total	
Club	Season	Division	Apps	Goals	Apps	Goals	Apps	Goals	Apps	Goals	Apps	Goals	Apps	Goals
Hapoel Be'er Sheva	2022–23	Israeli Premier League	2	0	0	0	0	0	–	–	0	0	2	0
Hapoel Be'er Sheva	2023–24	Israeli Premier League	5	0	0	0	1	0	3	0	0	0	9	0
Hapoel Be'er Sheva	Total		7	0	0	0	1	0	3	0	0	0	11	0
Career total			7	0	0	0	1	0	3	0	0	0	11	0

== Honours ==
Hapoel Beer Sheva

- Israeli Premier League: 2025–26
- Israel State Cup: 2024–25
- Israel Super Cup: 2025

== See also ==
- List of Jewish footballers
- List of Jews in sports
- List of Israelis
- List of Israel international footballers
