= Zahi Ahmed =

Israeli footballer (born 2001)

Personal information
- Date of birth: 12 August 2001 (age 25)
- Place of birth: Abu Snan, Israel
- Height: 1.82 m (6 ft 0 in)
- Position: Forward

Team information
- Current team: Hapoel Be'er Sheva
- Number: 9

Youth career
- 2010–2019: Hapoel Mate Asher
- 2016–2017: → FC Mi'ilya
- 2019–2021: Hapoel Acre

Senior career*
Years	Team	Apps	(Gls)
2019–2023	Hapoel Acre	111	(24)
2023–	Hapoel Be'er Sheva	60	(9)
2023–2024	→ Bnei Sakhnin (loan)	31	(4)

International career^{‡}
2026–	Israel	0	(0)
- * Club domestic league appearances and goals as of 19:30, 9 November 2026 (UTC) ‡ National team caps and goals as of 02:50, 18 November 2026 (UTC)

Zahi Ahmed (Hebrew: זאהי אחמד; Arabic: زاهي احمد; born 12 August 2001) is an Israeli professional footballer who plays as a forward for Israeli Premier League club Hapoel Be'er Sheva and the Israel national team.

== Career ==
=== Early career ===
Ahmed grew up in the youth department of Hapoel Mate Asher, FC Mi'ilya and Hapoel Acre. On 29 August 2019, Ahmed made his debut for Hapoel Acre senior team in a 3–3 draw against Maccabi Ahi Nazareth at the Acre Municipal Stadium as part of the Liga Leumit.

On 6 August 2020, in the 2020–21 season, Ahmed made his Toto Cup debut in a 1–0 loss to Hapoel Nof HaGalil at Green Stadium. On 2 November, Ahmed scored his debut goal in the Liga Leumit in a 2–0 victory over Hapoel Afula at the Acre Municipal Stadium. On 21 February 2021, Ahmed made his debut as part of the Israel State Cup in a 2–0 loss to Beitar Jerusalem at the Acre Municipal Stadium.

On 5 August, the 2021–22 season, Ahmed scored his first goal in the Toto Cup in a 4–1 loss to Hapoel Umm al-Fahm at the Acre Municipal Stadium. On 26 October, Ahmed scored his debut goal as part of the Israel State Cup in a 1–0 victory over Hapoel Ramat HaSharon at the Acre Municipal Stadium.

=== Hapoel Be'er Sheva ===
On 31 January 2023, Ahmed signed a four-year contract with Hapoel Be'er Sheva of the Israeli Premier League and will join the club from the 2023–24 season.

On 4 August 2026, Ahmed Scored the only Goal in the 1–0 win over Crvena Zvezda in the third round of the UEFA Champions League qualifying.

== International career ==
On 9 November 2026, Ahmed received his first call-up to the Israel national team by head coach Ran Ben Shimon for the UEFA Nations League matches against Kosovo national team and Austria national team.

== Career statistics ==
As of 1 June 2024

Appearances and goals by club, season and competition
Club	Season	League			National cup		League cup		Europe		Other		Total	
Club	Season	Division	Apps	Goals	Apps	Goals	Apps	Goals	Apps	Goals	Apps	Goals	Apps	Goals
Hapoel Acre	2019–20	Liga Leumit	3	0	0	0	0	0	–	–	0	0	3	0
Hapoel Acre	2020–21	Liga Leumit	36	6	1	0	3	0	–	–	0	0	40	6
Hapoel Acre	2021–22	Liga Leumit	36	5	2	1	5	2	–	–	0	0	42	8
Hapoel Acre	2022–23	Liga Leumit	36	13	1	0	3	3	–	–	0	0	40	16
Hapoel Acre	Total		111	24	4	1	11	5	–	–	0	0	126	30
Bnei Sakhnin	2023–24	Israeli Premier League	31	4	1	0	0	0	–	–	0	0	32	4
Career total			142	28	5	1	11	5	–	–	0	0	158	34

== Honours ==
Hapoel Beer Sheva

- Israeli Premier League: 2025–26
- Israel State Cup: 2024–25
- Israel Super Cup: 2025
