= Yoni Stoyanov =

Bulgarian footballer (born 2001)

Personal information
- Full name: Yoan Stoyanov
- Date of birth: 22 May 2001 (age 25)
- Place of birth: Plovdiv, Bulgaria
- Height: 1.78 m (5 ft 10 in)
- Positions: Midfielder; right back; winger

Team information
- Current team: Hapoel Be'er Sheva
- Number: 27

Youth career
- –2020: Hapoel Herzliya
- 2020–2022: Hapoel Kfar Saba

Senior career*
Years	Team	Apps	(Gls)
2020	Hapoel Herzliya	1	(0)
2020–2022	Hapoel Kfar Saba	49	(8)
2022–	Hapoel Be'er Sheva	74	(7)
2022–2023	→ Sektzia Ness Ziona (loan)	27	(5)

International career^{‡}
2021–2022	Bulgaria U21	3	(0)
2022–	Bulgaria	13	(0)
- * Club domestic league appearances and goals as of 00:55, 27 October 2026 (UTC) ‡ National team caps and goals as of 20:06, 16 November 2026 (UTC)

Yoan "Yoni" Stoyanov (Bulgarian: Йоан "Йони" Стоянов, Hebrew: יואן "יוני" סטויאנוב; born 22 May 2001) is a Bulgarian professional footballer who plays mainly as a wide midfielder for Israeli Premier League club Hapoel Be'er Sheva and the Bulgaria national team.

== Early life ==
Stoyanov was born in Plovdiv, Bulgaria. At the age of 2, he moved with his mother and maternal grandparents to Israel, where he grew up in the city of Herzliya.

== Club career ==
Stoyanov started his football career on the local Israeli side Hapoel Herzliya. In 2020, he moved to Hapoel Kfar Saba.

== International career ==
Being raised and living in Israel, Stoyanov possesses Israeli citizenship apart from his Bulgarian one, thus being eligible for the Israel national football team. Ultimately, he decided to represent his country of origin, and on 2 November 2021, Stoyanov received his first call-up to the Bulgarian under-21 side for 2023 UEFA European Under-21 Championship qualification matches against the Netherlands under-21 and Moldova under-21 sides. He made his debut for the team in the match against the Netherlands. He completed his debut for senior national team of Bulgaria in the match against Gibraltar on 23 September, won by Bulgaria with a 5:1 result.

== Career statistics ==
=== Club ===
As of 8 November 2026

Appearances and goals by club, season and competition
Club	Season	League			Cup		Continental		Other		Total	
Club	Season	Division	Apps	Goals	Apps	Goals	Apps	Goals	Apps	Goals	Apps	Goals
Hapoel Herzliya	2019–20	Liga Alef	1	0	0	0	–		–		1	0
Hapoel Herzliya	Total		1	0	0	0	0	0	0	0	1	0
Hapoel Kfar Saba	2020–21	Israeli Premier League	14	0	1	0	–		–		15	0
Hapoel Kfar Saba	2021–22	Liga Leumit	35	8	1	0	–		–		36	8
Hapoel Kfar Saba	Total		49	8	2	0	0	0	0	0	51	8
Hapoel Be'er Sheva	2022–23	Israeli Premier League	1	0	0	0	1	0	–		2	0
Hapoel Be'er Sheva	2023–24	Israeli Premier League	35	5	5	0	4	1	0	0	44	5
Hapoel Be'er Sheva	2024–25	Israeli Premier League	27	2	3	1	2	0	0	0	32	3
Hapoel Be'er Sheva	2025–26	Israeli Premier League	6	0	1	0	0	0	0	0	7	0
Hapoel Be'er Sheva	2026–27	Israeli Premier League	5	0	1	0	0	0	1	0	7	0
Hapoel Be'er Sheva	Total		74	7	10	1	7	1	1	0	92	8
Sektzia Ness Ziona (loan)	2022–23	Israeli Premier League	27	5	2	0	–		1	0	30	5
Career total			151	20	14	1	7	1	1	0	173	22

=== International ===
As of match played 16 November 2026

Appearances and goals by national team and year
National team	Year	Apps	Goals
Bulgaria	2023	8	0
Bulgaria	2024	1	0
Bulgaria	2026	4	0
Total		13	0

== Honours ==
Hapoel Be'er Sheva

- Israeli Premier League: 2025–26
- Israel State Cup: 2024–25
- Israel Super Cup: 2022, 2025
