= Lucas Ventura =

Brazilian footballer

Personal information
- Full name: Lucas de Souza Ventura
- Date of birth: 19 May 1998 (age 28)
- Place of birth: Leopoldina, Minas Gerais, Brazil
- Height: 1.80 m (5 ft 11 in)
- Position: Defensive midfielder

Team information
- Current team: Hapoel Be'er Sheva
- Number: 25

Youth career
- 2013–2016: Cruzeiro

Senior career*
Years	Team	Apps	(Gls)
2017–2023	Cruzeiro	24	(0)
2018	→ Sport Recife (loan)	4	(0)
2019–2020	→ Boa Esporte (loan)	14	(0)
2022	→ Avaí (loan)	21	(0)
2023–2024	Portimonense	44	(2)
2024–	Hapoel Be'er Sheva	70	(0)

International career^{‡}
2014	Brazil U17		
- * Club domestic league appearances and goals as of 13:05, 19 October 2026 (UTC) ‡ National team caps and goals as of 13:05, 19 October 2026 (UTC)

Lucas de Souza Ventura (born 19 May 1998), known as Lucas Ventura or sometimes as Nonoca, is a Brazilian professional footballer who plays as an defensive midfielder for Israeli Premier League club Hapoel Be'er Sheva.

== Professional career ==
Lucas Ventura was recruited by Cruzeiro Youth Team in 2014, while playing a tournament in his native city. In 2017, Cruzeiro's coach Mano Menezes promoted him to the senior squad. On April 9, 2017, Nonoca made his professional debut in the match against Democrata-GV at Campeonato Mineiro.

When Lucas Ventura was promoted to Cruzeiro's First Team, he was convinced by his staff and family to use the name Lucas Ventura, but decided to change back to his nickname in June 2017, defending he was always known as Nonoca by Cruzeiro's colleagues and staff, since he was a kid growing up on the junior team. Nonoca participated well in several games in 2017, getting regular call-ups and being regularly used as a sub for Cruzeiro's defensive midfielders.

== International career ==
Lucas Ventura was called for Brazil U17 in 2014.

== Honours ==
Hapoel Beer Sheva

- Israeli Premier League: 2025–26
- Israel State Cup: 2024–25
- Israel Super Cup: 2025
