= Niv Eliasi =

Israeli footballer (born 2001)

Personal information
- Date of birth: 21 February 2002 (age 24)
- Place of birth: Sde Warburg, Israel
- Height: 1.88 m (6 ft 2 in)
- Position: Goalkeeper

Team information
- Current team: Levadiakos (on loan from Hapoel Be'er Sheva)
- Number: 55

Youth career
- 2011–2019: Aliyah Kfar Saba
- 2019–2020: Maccabi Netanya
- 2020–2021: Hapoel Ramat HaSharon

Senior career*
Years	Team	Apps	(Gls)
2021–	Hapoel Be'er Sheva	87	(0)
2023–2023	→ Hapoel Ramat HaSharon	11	(0)
2026–	→ Levadiakos	3	(0)

International career^{‡}
2023–2024	Israel U21	7	(0)
- * Club domestic league appearances and goals as of 21:00, 20 September 2026 (UTC) ‡ National team caps and goals as of 15:50, 29 May 2026 (UTC)

Niv Eliasi (Hebrew: ניב אליאסי; born 21 February 2002) is an Israeli professional footballer who plays as an goalkeeper for Super League Greece club Levadiakos and the Israel national team, on loan from Israeli Premier League club Hapoel Be'er Sheva.

== Early life ==
Eliasi was born in moshav Sde Warburg, Israel, to a Sephardi Jewish family.

== Club career ==
=== Hapoel Be'er Sheva ===
On July 21, 2021, Eliasi signed a five-year contract with Hapoel Be'er Sheva from the Israeli Premier League.

On January 15, 2023, Eliasi was loaned to Hapoel Ramat HaSharon from the Liga Leumit until the end of the season. By the end of the season, Eliasi made 11 appearances.

Loan to Levadiakos

On 2 August 2026, Eliasi joined Super League Greece club Levadiakos on a season-long loan from Hapoel Be'er Sheva from the Israeli Premier League, with an option to make the transfer permanent for €1.2 million.

== International career ==
Eliasi was selected for Israel's squad to compete in the men's football at the 2024 Summer Olympics.

== Honours ==
Hapoel Beer Sheva

- Israeli Premier League: 2025–26
- Israel State Cup: 2024–25
- Israel Super Cup: 2025
