= Maroun Gantous =

Israeli footballer (born 1996)

Maroun Gantous مَارُون غَنطُوس
Personal information
- Full name: Maroun Gantous
- Date of birth: June 15, 1996 (age 30)
- Place of birth: Sakhnin, Israel
- Position: Center-back

Team information
- Current team: Bnei Sakhnin
- Number: 2

Youth career
- 2008–2016: Bnei Sakhnin

Senior career*
Years	Team	Apps	(Gls)
2016–	Bnei Sakhnin	250	(3)

International career^{‡}
2017	Israel U21	1	(0)
2022–	Israel	1	(0)
- * Club domestic league appearances and goals as of 24 June 2026 ‡ National team caps and goals as of 28 September 2022

Maroun Gantous (also Maron Ghantous or Maroun Gantus, Arabic: مَارُون غَنطُوس, Hebrew: מארון גנטוס; born June 15, 1996) is an Israeli footballer who plays for Bnei Sakhnin.

== Early life ==
Gantous was born in Sakhnin, Israel, to a Christian-Arab family.

== Career ==
Gantous started his career in Bnei Sakhnin. On 5 January 2017 made his debut in the 3–1 win against Maccabi Sha'arayim.

== Career statistics ==
As of 30 July 2024

Club	Season	League			State Cup		Toto Cup		Continental		Other		Total	
Club	Season	Division	Apps	Goals	Apps	Goals	Apps	Goals	Apps	Goals	Apps	Goals	Apps	Goals
Bnei Sakhnin	2016–17	Israeli Premier League	12	0	1	0	0	0	0	0	0	0	13	0
Bnei Sakhnin	2017–18	Israeli Premier League	24	0	0	0	4	0	0	0	0	0	28	0
Bnei Sakhnin	2018–19	Israeli Premier League	24	0	3	0	1	0	0	0	0	0	28	0
Bnei Sakhnin	2019–20	Liga Leumit	32	1	2	0	4	0	0	0	0	0	38	1
Bnei Sakhnin	2020–21	Israeli Premier League	31	0	2	0	0	0	0	0	0	0	33	0
Bnei Sakhnin	2021–22	Israeli Premier League	28	0	2	0	4	0	0	0	0	0	34	0
Bnei Sakhnin	2022–23	Israeli Premier League	26	0	0	0	5	0	0	0	0	0	31	0
Bnei Sakhnin	2023–24	Israeli Premier League	26	2	0	0	1	0	0	0	0	0	28	2
Bnei Sakhnin	2024–25	Israeli Premier League	0	0	0	0	1	0	0	0	0	0	1	0
Bnei Sakhnin	Total		203	3	10	0	20	0	0	0	0	0	234	3
Career total			203	3	10	0	20	0	0	0	0	0	234	3
