= Jordan Sebban =

French footballer (born 1997)

Personal information
- Date of birth: 6 January 1997 (age 29)
- Place of birth: Toulouse, France
- Height: 1.75 m (5 ft 9 in)
- Position: Midfielder

Youth career
- Toulouse

Senior career*
Years	Team	Apps	(Gls)
2014–2018	Toulouse B	68	(0)
2018–2019	El Ejido	31	(1)
2019–2020	Recreativo Granada	17	(0)
2021	KuPS	20	(0)
2021	→ KuFu-98	1	(0)
2022–2025	FC Ashdod	55	(1)
2025	Villefranche	1	(0)
- * Club domestic league appearances and goals as of 8 October 2025

Jordan Sebban (born 6 January 1997) is a French footballer who plays as a midfielder.

== Career ==
Sebban started his career with the reserves of French Ligue 1 side Toulouse.

In 2018, he signed for El Ejido in the Spanish third division.

In 2019, Sebban signed for the reserves of Spanish La Liga club Granada.

Before the 2021 season, he signed for Kuopion Palloseura (KuPS) in Finnish Veikkausliiga.

On 16 August 2022 signed for the Israeli Premier League club F.C. Ashdod.

== Personal life ==
Sebban is of Jewish descent. After moving to Israel to play for Ashdod, he received an Israeli citizenship thanks to the Law of Return.

== Career statistics ==
As of 31 January 2025

Appearances and goals by club, season and competition
Club	Season	League			Cups (Note: Includes Suomen Cup and Israel State Cup)		League cup (Note: Includes Toto Cup)		Europe		Total	
Club	Season	Division	Apps	Goals	Apps	Goals	Apps	Goals	Apps	Goals	Apps	Goals
Toulouse B	2014–15	National 3	7	0	–		–		–		7	0
Toulouse B	2015–16	National 3	18	0	–		–		–		18	0
Toulouse B	2016–17	National 3	22	0	–		–		–		22	0
Toulouse B	2017–18	National 3	21	0	–		–		–		21	0
Toulouse B	Total		68	0	0	0	0	0	0	0	68	0
El Ejido	2018–19	Segunda División B	32	1	–		–		–		32	1
Recreativo Granada	2019–20	Segunda División B	17	0	–		–		–		17	0
KuPS	2021	Veikkausliiga	20	0	3	0	–		7 (Note: Appearances in UEFA Europa Conference League)	1	30	1
KuFu-98	2021	Kakkonen	1	0	–		–		–		31	0
F.C. Ashdod	2022–23	Israeli Premier League	32	1	4	0	4	0	–		40	1
F.C. Ashdod	2023–24	Israeli Premier League	20	0	0	0	4	0	–		24	0
F.C. Ashdod	2024–25	Israeli Premier League	3	0	0	0	5	0	–		8	0
F.C. Ashdod	Total		55	1	4	0	13	0	0	0	72	1
Career total			193	2	7	0	13	0	7	1	220	3
