= 2024–25 Israeli Premier League =

Israeli Premier League
- Season: 2024–25
- Dates: 24 August 2024 – 24 May 2025
- Champions: Maccabi Tel Aviv (26th title)
- Relegated: Maccabi Petah Tikva; Hapoel Hadera
- UEFA Champions League: Maccabi Tel Aviv
- UEFA Europa League: Hapoel Be'er Sheva
- UEFA Conference League: Maccabi Haifa; Beitar Jerusalem
- Matches: 240
- Goals: 668 (2.78 per match)
- Top goalscorer: Guy Melamed (21)
- Biggest home win: Beitar Jerusalem 5–0 Maccabi Petah Tikva (4 December 2024); Maccabi Tel Aviv 5–0 Beitar Jerusalem (24 May 2025); Hapoel Be'er Sheva 5–0 Hapoel Haifa (24 May 2025)
- Biggest away win: Maccabi Netanya 1–6 Maccabi Tel Aviv (12 May 2025)
- Highest scoring: F.C. Ashdod 3–5 Bnei Sakhnin (31 December 2024)
- Longest winning run: Hapoel Be'er Sheva (6)
- Longest unbeaten run: Hapoel Be'er Sheva (17)
- Longest winless run: Hapoel Hadera (12)
- Longest losing run: Ironi Kiryat Shmona (6)
- All statistics correct as of 25 May 2025.

The 2024–25 Israeli Premier League, also known as Ligat TOTO Winner for sponsorship reasons, is the 26th season since the introduction of the Israeli Premier League in 1999 and the 83rd season of top-tier football in Israel.

== Teams ==
The league consisted of fourteen teams; twelve sides from the previous season and two promoted teams from the 2023–24 Liga Leumit (Ironi Kiryat Shmona and Ironi Tiberias). Ironi Kiryat Shmona returned to the top flight after a single season, Ironi Tiberias was promoted for the first time in its history. They replaced the 2023–24 Israeli Premier League bottom two teams, Hapoel Tel Aviv and Hapoel Petah Tikva who were relegated to the 2024–25 Liga Leumit.

Locations of the 2024–25 Israeli Premier League teams

=== Stadiums and locations ===
Team	Location	Stadium	Capacity
Beitar Jerusalem	Jerusalem	Teddy Stadium	31,733
Bnei Sakhnin	Sakhnin	Doha Stadium	8,500
F.C. Ashdod	Ashdod	Yud-Alef Stadium	7,800
Hapoel Be'er Sheva	Be'er Sheva	Turner Stadium	16,126
Hapoel Hadera	Hadera	Netanya Stadium (Note: The team play their home games at a neutral venue because their own ground does not meet league requirements.)	13,610
Hapoel Haifa	Haifa	Sammy Ofer Stadium	30,950
Hapoel Jerusalem	Jerusalem	Teddy Stadium	31,733
Ironi Kiryat Shmona	Kiryat Shmona	Netanya Stadium	13,610
Ironi Tiberias	Tiberias	Green Stadium	5,200
Maccabi Bnei Reineh	Reineh	Green Stadium	5,200
Maccabi Haifa	Haifa	Sammy Ofer Stadium	30,950
Maccabi Netanya	Netanya	Netanya Stadium	13,610
Maccabi Petah Tikva	Petah Tikva	HaMoshava Stadium	11,500
Maccabi Tel Aviv	Tel Aviv	Bloomfield Stadium	29,400

Beitar Jerusalem Hapoel Jerusalem	Hapoel Haifa Maccabi Haifa	Maccabi Tel Aviv
Teddy Stadium, Jerusalem	Sammy Ofer Stadium, Haifa	Bloomfield Stadium, Tel Aviv
Maccabi Netanya Hapoel Hadera Ironi Kiryat Shmona	Maccabi Petah Tikva	Bnei Sakhnin
Netanya Stadium, Netanya	HaMoshava Stadium, Petah Tikva	Acre Municipal Stadium, Acre
F.C. Ashdod	Hapoel Be'er Sheva	Ironi Tiberias Maccabi Bnei Reineh
Yud-Alef Stadium, Ashdod	Turner Stadium, Be'er Sheva	Green Stadium, Nof HaGalil

=== Personnel and sponsorship ===
Team	President	Manager	Captain	Kitmaker	Shirt sponsor
Beitar Jerusalem	(Israel) Barak Abramov	(Israel) Barak Yitzhaki	(Israel) Yarden Shua	Umbro	Geshem Holdings
Bnei Sakhnin	(Israel) Mohammed Abu Younes	(Israel) Slobodan Drapić	(Israel) Maroun Gantous	Le Coq Sportif	Walid Automotive
F.C. Ashdod	(Israel) Rafi Niddam	(Israel) Klemi Saban	(Israel) Tom Ben Zaken	Nike	Blue Home Projects
Hapoel Be'er Sheva	(Israel) Alona Barkat	(Israel) Ran Kojok	(Israel) (Portugal) Miguel Vítor	Umbro	Victory
Hapoel Hadera	(Israel) Yakir Schwartz	(Israel) Asaf Nimni	(Israel) Menashe Zalka	Umbro	BTB
Hapoel Haifa	(Israel) Yoav Katz	(Israel) Ronny Levy	(Israel) Dor Malul	Diadora	Leos Madia
Hapoel Jerusalem	(Israel) Yotam Karmon	(Israel) Ziv Arie	(Israel) Ofek Bitton	Legea	Allon ventures
Ironi Kiryat Shmona	(Israel) Izzy Sheratzky	(Israel) Shay Barda	(Israel) Ayid Habshi	Diadora	Ituran
Ironi Tiberias	(Israel) Arie Kalmanzon and Mickey Bitan	(Israel) Eliran Hudeda	(Brazil) Daniel Tenenbaum	Le Coq Sportif	Yochelman Group
Maccabi Bnei Reineh	(Israel) Saeed Basoul	(Israel) Sharon Mimer	(Israel) Eyad Hutba	Zeus Sport	Boneh Renih
Maccabi Haifa	(Israel) Ya'akov Shahar	(Israel) Itay Mordechai (caretaker)	(Israel) Lior Refaelov	Adidas	Volvo
Maccabi Netanya	(Israel) Eyal Segal	(Israel) Yossi Abukasis	(Israel) Karem Jaber	Lotto	
Maccabi Petah Tikva	(Israel) Avraham Luzon	(Israel) Noam Shoham	(Israel) Yarden Cohen	Kelme	
Maccabi Tel Aviv	(Canada) Mitchell Goldhar	(Serbia) Žarko Lazetić	(Israel) Eran Zahavi	Fila	Pelephone

==== Managerial changes ====
Team	Outgoing manager	Manner of departure	Date of vacancy	Position in table	Incoming manager	Date of appointment
Maccabi Haifa	(Israel) Messay Dego	End of contract	29 May 2024	Pre-season	(Israel) Barak Bakhar	29 May 2024
Hapoel Be'er Sheva	(Israel) Elyaniv Barda	End of contract	31 May 2024	Pre-season	(Israel) Ran Kojok	2 June 2024
Maccabi Petah Tikva	(Israel) Ran Kojok	End of contract	2 June 2024	Pre-season	(Israel) Dan Roman	3 June 2024
Maccabi Tel Aviv	(Republic of Ireland) Robbie Keane	Mutual consent	7 June 2024	Pre-season	(Serbia) Žarko Lazetić	24 June 2024
Maccabi Netanya	(Israel) Marco Balbul	Sacked	29 October 2024	13th	(Israel) Yossi Abukasis	29 October 2024
Hapoel Hadera	(Israel) Haim Silvas	Sacked	2 November 2024	14th	(Israel) Asaf Nimni	2 November 2024
Maccabi Petah Tikva	(Israel) Dan Roman	Sacked	7 December 2024	11th	(Israel) Tamir Luzon	7 December 2024

== Foreign players ==
The number of foreign players were restricted to six per team.
In bold: Players that have been capped for their national team.

Club	Player 1	Player 2	Player 3	Player 4	Player 5	Player 6	Non-visa player
Beitar Jerusalem	(Portugal) Miguel Silva	(Ivory Coast) Ismaila Soro	(Costa Rica) **Mayron George**	(France) Jean Marcelin	(Ghana) **Patrick Twumasi**		(Russia) Grigori Morozov
Bnei Sakhnin	(Cyprus) **Constantinos Soteriou**	(Belgium) Stéphane Oméonga	(Nigeria) Chinemerem Godwin				(Palestine) Abed Yassin (Palestine) Hadi Rabah
F.C. Ashdod	(Uganda) **Timothy Awany**	(Ghana) Montari Kamaheni	(Cameroon) Martin Ndzie	(Ghana) Ebenezer Mamatah			(France) Jordan Sebban
Hapoel Be'er Sheva	(Portugal) Hélder Lopes	(Gabon) **André Biyogo Poko**	(Colombia) Déinner Quiñones	(Kazakhstan) **Artur Shushenachev**	(Zambia) **Kings Kangwa**		(Bulgaria) **Yoni Stoyanov**
Hapoel Hadera	(Senegal) Mamadou Mbodj	(Nigeria) James Adeniyi	(France) Ibrahim Sangaré	(Ghana) Godsway Donyoh			(Serbia) Nikola Đurković
Hapoel Haifa	(Republic of the Congo) **Fernand Mayembo**	(Belarus) **Dmitry Antilevsky**	(Burkina Faso) **Dramane Salou**	(Mali) **Thiemoko Diarra**	(Ivory Coast) Aboubacar Doumbia	(Jamaica) Javon East	
Hapoel Jerusalem	(Ivory Coast) Eloge Yao	(Ivory Coast) Cédric Franck Don	(Netherlands) Jelle Duin	(Nigeria) Ibeh Ransom Jidechukwu	(North Macedonia) Marko Alchevski		
Ironi Kiryat Shmona	(Guinea) Sekou Tidiany Bangoura	(Panama) **Cristian Martínez**					
Ironi Tiberias	(Argentina) Franco Mazurek	(Ukraine) Stanislav Bilenkyi	(Czech Republic) Ondřej Bačo				(Brazil) Daniel Tenenbaum
Maccabi Bnei Reineh	(Serbia) Nemanja Ljubisavljević	(Guinea-Bissau) **Sambinha**	(Nigeria) Muhammed Usman Edu	(Nigeria) Ezekiel Henty			(Palestine) Omar Nahfaoui (Palestine) **Abdallah Jaber**
Maccabi Haifa	(Senegal) **Abdoulaye Seck**	(Democratic Republic of the Congo) **Vital Nsimba**	(Brazil) Pedrão	(Curaçao) **Xander Severina**	(Spain) Matías Nahuel	(Brazil) Ricardinho	(Niger) **Ali Mohamed** (Germany) Erik Shuranov (Argentina) Tomás Sultani (Ukraine) Oleksandr Syrota
Maccabi Netanya	(Ghana) Ibrahim Tanko	(Cape Verde) Heriberto Tavares	(Venezuela) **Freddy Vargas**				
Maccabi Petah Tikva	(Cyprus) **Andreas Karo**	(Ukraine) Daniel Joulani	(Mali) **Saliou Guindo**				(Argentina) Marco Wolff
Maccabi Tel Aviv	(Ghana) Henry Addo	(Netherlands) Tyrese Asante	(Mali) Issouf Sissokho	(Serbia) Nemanja Stojić	(Brazil) Weslley Patati	(Croatia) Simon Sluga	(Netherlands) Joris van Overeem

== Regular season ==
=== Regular season table ===
Pos	Team	Pld	W	D	L	GF	GA	GD	Pts	Qualification
1	Hapoel Be'er Sheva	26	18	6	2	52	18	+34	58 (Note: Hapoel Be'er Sheva had 2 points deducted following riot in Bnei Sakhnin match.)	Qualification for the Championship round
2	Maccabi Tel Aviv	26	17	6	3	56	27	+29	57	Qualification for the Championship round
3	Maccabi Haifa	26	14	6	6	54	32	+22	47 (Note: Maccabi Haifa had 1 point deducted following riot in Maccabi Tel Aviv match.)	Qualification for the Championship round
4	Beitar Jerusalem	26	13	7	6	48	34	+14	46	Qualification for the Championship round
5	Hapoel Haifa	26	12	5	9	39	31	+8	41	Qualification for the Championship round
6	Maccabi Netanya	26	11	4	11	39	37	+2	37	Qualification for the Championship round
7	Ironi Kiryat Shmona	26	10	4	12	28	38	−10	34	Qualification for the Relegation round
8	Maccabi Bnei Reineh	26	9	4	13	27	35	−8	31	Qualification for the Relegation round
9	Hapoel Jerusalem	26	7	9	10	32	35	−3	30	Qualification for the Relegation round
10	Ironi Tiberias	26	6	9	11	20	36	−16	27	Qualification for the Relegation round
11	Maccabi Petah Tikva	26	6	6	14	22	44	−22	24	Qualification for the Relegation round
12	Bnei Sakhnin	26	6	6	14	19	37	−18	23 (Note: Bnei Sakhnin had 1 point deducted following riot in Hapoel Be'er Sheva match.)	Qualification for the Relegation round
13	F.C. Ashdod	26	5	7	14	35	48	−13	22	Qualification for the Relegation round
14	Hapoel Hadera	26	3	11	12	23	42	−19	20	Qualification for the Relegation round

Source: Soccerway, One
Rules for classification: 1) Points; 2) Goal difference; 3) Matches won; 4) Goals scored; 5) Head-to-head points; 6) Head-to-head goal difference; 7) Head-to-head goals scored; 8) Play-off.

=== Regular season results ===
Home \ Away	HBS	MTA	MHA	BEI	HHA	MNE	IKS	MBR	HJE	ITI	MPT	BnS	ASH	HAH
Hapoel Be'er Sheva	—	2–2	3–3	4–1	3–0	1–0	5–1	1–1	3–1	4–0	1–0	0–0 (Note: No-points cancelled game.)	3–1	2–1
Maccabi Tel Aviv	1–0	—	2–0	1–1	2–0	4–1	0–1	0–1	2–1	1–1	3–2	3–1	5–1	2–2
Maccabi Haifa	0–2	0–3 (Note: Originally 1–1, later changed.)	—	1–3	1–1	2–1	4–1	2–0	3–3	4–0	1–0	3–0	1–2	4–2
Beitar Jerusalem	1–1	3–1	3–2	—	1–0	2–0	1–1	1–4	1–1	1–1	5–0	1–0	3–2	0–0
Hapoel Haifa	0–1	1–1	1–4	3–2	—	1–3	4–3	1–3	4–0	1–0	5–1	2–1	2–1	3–0
Maccabi Netanya	1–2	1–2	0–2	3–0	0–3	—	2–0	2–0	2–1	1–1	1–2	4–0	2–2	2–1
Ironi Kiryat Shmona	0–1	1–2	0–4	0–3	2–1	0–1	—	0–0	2–0	2–0	2–0	2–1	3–2	1–1
Maccabi Bnei Reineh	1–0	1–2	2–2	0–2	0–2	4–3	1–0	—	0–0	1–0	1–2	0–1	1–4	1–2
Hapoel Jerusalem	0–2	2–3	0–0	3–3	1–0	2–3	0–0	0–1	—	4–0	4–1	1–0	1–0	1–1
Ironi Tiberias	0–2	2–2	0–0	1–0	1–1	2–3	3–1	1–0	0–2	—	1–2	1–0	2–1	1–1
Maccabi Petah Tikva	2–5	0–3	1–2	1–2	0–0	0–1	0–1	2–1	2–0	0–0	—	1–1	2–2	0–0
Bnei Sakhnin	0–0	0–4	0–3 (Note: Originally 1–1, later changed.)	2–1	0–2	1–0	0–1	2–0	0–2	0–0	2–0	—	2–2	0–1
F.C. Ashdod	0–2	0–2	1–3	2–3	0–1	0–0	2–1	1–2	1–1	1–0	0–0	3–5	—	1–1
Hapoel Hadera	1–2	2–3	1–3	0–4	0–0	2–2	0–2	2–1	1–1	1–2	0–1	0–0	0–3	—

Source: "Ligat Ha'Al – Matches".
Legend: Blue = home team win; Yellow = draw; Red = away team win.

== Championship round ==
Key numbers for pairing determination (number marks position after 26 games)

Rounds
27th	28th	29th	30th	31st	32nd	33rd	34th	35th	36th
1 – 6; 2 – 5; 3 – 4	1 – 2; 5 – 3; 6 – 4	2 – 6; 3 – 1; 4 – 5	1 – 4; 2 – 3; 6 – 5	3 – 6; 4 – 2; 5 – 1	6 – 1; 5 – 2; 4 – 3	2 – 1; 3 – 5; 4 – 6	6 – 2; 1 – 3; 5 – 4	3 – 2; 4 – 1; 5 – 6	6 – 3; 2 – 4; 1 – 5

=== Championship round table ===
Pos	Team	Pld	W	D	L	GF	GA	GD	Pts	Qualification	MTA	HBS	MHA	BEI	HHA	MNE
1	Maccabi Tel Aviv (C)	36	24	8	4	86	36	+50	80	Qualification for the Champions League second qualifying round	—	1–1	1–1	5–0	3–0	4–1
2	Hapoel Be'er Sheva	36	24	8	4	75	28	+47	78 (Note: Hapoel Be'er Sheva had 2 points deducted following riot in Bnei Sakhnin match.)	Qualification for the Europa League first qualifying round (Note: Hapoel Be'er Sheva qualified for the Europa League first qualifying round as the 2024–25 Israel State Cup winners; the second Conference League spot was passed to the fourth-placed team.)	1–3	—	4–1	3–1	5–0	2–0
3	Maccabi Haifa	36	18	8	10	68	54	+14	61 (Note: Maccabi Haifa had 1 point deducted following riot in Maccabi Tel Aviv match.)	Qualification for the Conference League second qualifying round	0–3	0–3	—	3–3	1–5	1–0
4	Beitar Jerusalem	36	15	9	12	58	54	+4	53 (Note: Beitar Jerusalem had 1 point deducted following riot in Maccabi Haifa match.)	Qualification for the Conference League second qualifying round	3–1	1–1	1–2	—	0–1	0–3
5	Hapoel Haifa	36	15	7	14	51	50	+1	52		1–3	1–2	0–2	1–0	—	1–1
6	Maccabi Netanya	36	13	6	17	51	58	−7	45		1–6	2–1	2–3	0–1	2–2	—

Source: Soccerway
Legend: Blue = home team win; Yellow = draw; Red = away team win.
Rules for classification: 1) Points; 2) Goal difference; 3) Matches won; 4) Goals scored; 5) Head-to-head points; 6) Head-to-head goal difference; 7) Head-to-head goals scored; 8) Play-off.
(C) Champions

== Relegation round ==
=== Relegation round table ===
Pos	Team	Pld	W	D	L	GF	GA	GD	Pts	Relegation	HJE	MBR	IKS	BnS	ASH	ITI	MPT	HAH
7	Hapoel Jerusalem	33	11	11	11	47	42	+5	44				2–0	4–1		3–1	0–0	
8	Maccabi Bnei Reineh	33	12	5	16	36	43	−7	41		2–1				1–1		0–2	1–2
9	Ironi Kiryat Shmona	33	11	4	18	32	52	−20	37			0–3		0–1		0–2	2–1	
10	Bnei Sakhnin	33	10	7	16	26	44	−18	36 (Note: Bnei Sakhnin had 1 point deducted following riot in Hapoel Be'er Sheva match.)			0–1			0–0	2–1		
11	F.C. Ashdod	33	8	11	14	48	55	−7	35		1–1		4–2					4–1
12	Ironi Tiberias	33	8	11	14	28	45	−17	35			2–1			1–2		0–0	1–1
13	Maccabi Petah Tikva (R)	33	8	9	16	31	50	−19	33	Relegation to Liga Leumit				1–2	1–1			4–1
14	Hapoel Hadera (R)	33	5	12	16	31	57	−26	27	Relegation to Liga Leumit	2–4		1–0	0–1				

Source: Soccerway
Legend: Blue = home team win; Yellow = draw; Red = away team win.
Rules for classification: 1) Points; 2) Goal difference; 3) Matches won; 4) Goals scored; 5) Head-to-head points; 6) Head-to-head goal difference; 7) Head-to-head goals scored; 8) Play-off.
(R) Relegated

== Season statistics ==
=== Top scorers ===
Rank	Player	Club	Goals
1	(Israel) Guy Melamed	Hapoel Haifa \ Maccabi Haifa	21
2	(Israel) Dia Saba	Maccabi Haifa	16
3	(Israel) Dor Turgeman	Maccabi Tel Aviv	15
4	(Israel) Dean David	Maccabi Haifa	14
4	(Israel) Mohammed Kna'an	F.C. Ashdod	14
4	(Zambia) Kings Kangwa	Hapoel Be'er Sheva	14
7	(Serbia) Igor Zlatanović	Maccabi Netanya	13
7	(Israel) Alon Turgeman	Hapoel Be'er Sheva	13
9	(Brazil) Weslley Patati	Maccabi Tel Aviv	12
9	(Israel) Eran Zahavi	Maccabi Tel Aviv	12

== Attendances ==
No.	Club	Average attendance	Change	Highest
1	Maccabi Haifa FC	22,953	12,8%	29,064
2	Maccabi Tel Aviv FC	20,442	0,4%	28,429
3	Beitar Jerusalem FC	18,532	46,0%	27,000
4	Hapoel Be'er Sheva FC	12,785	28,6%	15,784
5	Maccabi Netanya FC	6,039	-0,7%	12,420
6	Hapoel Jerusalem FC	5,043	34,3%	23,993
7	Hapoel Haifa FC	4,414	-6,2%	13,100
8	Maccabi Petah Tikva FC	3,068	-7,3%	9,520
9	FC Ashdod	2,590	27,5%	6,664
10	Hapoel Hadera-Giv'at Olga FC	1,827	-34,7%	6,545
11	Hapoel Ironi Kiryat Shmona FC	1,594	-	8,162
12	Ironi Tiberias FC	1,416	-	5,200
13	Maccabi Bnei Reineh FC	1,367	-35,5%	4,088
14	Bnei Sakhnin FC	1,146	-45,6%	4,311

== See also ==
- 2024–25 Liga Leumit
- 2024–25 Liga Alef
- 2024–25 Israel State Cup
