= Marko Alchevski =

Macedonian footballer (born 2002)

Personal information
- Full name: Marko Alchevski
- Date of birth: 16 April 2002 (age 24)
- Place of birth: Bitola, Macedonia
- Height: 1.90 m (6 ft 3 in)
- Position: Goalkeeper

Team information
- Current team: OFK Beograd (on loan from Hapoel Jerusalem)
- Number: 80

Youth career
- Eden Na Eden Fudbalska Shkola
- 2017–2020: AP Brera Strumica

Senior career*
Years	Team	Apps	(Gls)
2020–2024	AP Brera Strumica	65	(0)
2022	→ Borec (loan)	9	(0)
2024–	Hapoel Jerusalem	2	(0)
2025–	→ OFK Beograd (loan)	1	(0)

International career^{‡}
2018	Macedonia U16	2	(0)
2018	Macedonia U17	2	(0)
2020	Macedonia U19	2	(0)
2021–2024	Macedonia U21	19	(0)
- * Club domestic league appearances and goals as of 26 July 2025 ‡ National team caps and goals as of 15 October 2024

Marko Alchevski (Macedonian: Марко Алчевски; born 16 April 2002) is a Macedonian professional footballer who plays for Serbian SuperLiga club OFK Beograd on loan from Hapoel Jerusalem as a goalkeeper.

== Club career ==
Alchevski started his professional career in the youth team of AP Brera Strumica.

In late September 2018 at 16 years, 5 months and 3 days, Alchevski was the youngest debutant in the senior team of AP Brera Strumica.

On 8 May 2019, he made his senior debut in a 0–4 win against Pobeda. In January 2022, he was loaned to Borec until the end of the season. Alchevski served as AP Brera Strumica second goalkeeper until the end of October 2022, when he became the club's first-choice goalkeeper.

=== Hapoel Jerusalem ===
On 8 July 2024 signed for Israeli Premier League club Hapoel Jerusalem.

=== OFK Beograd ===
In the summer of 2025, he was loaned to OFK Beograd of the Serbian SuperLiga, after playing only two games in his season with Hapoel Jerusalem.

== International career ==
He played for the Macedonian national teams at U16, U17 and U19 and U21 levels.
