= Ran Kozuch =

Israeli football player and manager

Ran Kozuch רן קוז'וך
Personal information
- Full name: Ran Kozuch
- Date of birth: 12 January 1981 (age 45)
- Place of birth: Netanya, Israel
- Position: Right back

Team information
- Current team: Hapoel Be'er Sheva (manager)

Youth career
- Maccabi Netanya

Senior career*
Years	Team	Apps	(Gls)
2001–2003	Maccabi Netanya	31	(0)
2003–2004	Ironi Kiryat Shmona		
2004–2005	Hapoel Jerusalem		
2005–2006	Hapoel Acre		
2006–2009	Ironi Kiryat Shmona	63	(1)
2009–2010	Hapoel Ashkelon	33	(0)
2010–2012	Hapoel Acre	34	(0)
2012–2013	Hapoel Ashkelon	17	(1)
2013	Maccabi Umm al-Fahm	10	(0)
2014	Maccabi Kiryat Gat	16	(0)
2014–2015	Hapoel Ramat HaSharon	26	(0)
2015–2016	Hapoel Beit She'an	7	(0)
2016	Hakoah Ramat Gan	14	(1)
2017	Hapoel Herzliya	25	(0)
2018	Hapoel Baqa al-Gharbiyye	14	(0)

International career
2002	Israel U21	1	(0)

Managerial career
- 2018: Bnei Sakhnin (assistant)
- 2018–2019: Hapoel Petah Tikva (assistant)
- 2019: Ironi Kiryat Shmona (assistant)
- 2020: Hapoel Hadera (assistant)
- 2020–2022: Maccabi Netanya (assistant)
- 2021: Maccabi Netanya (caretaker)
- 2022–2023: Maccabi Netanya
- 2024: Maccabi Petah Tikva
- 2024–: Hapoel Be'er Sheva
- * Club domestic league appearances and goals

Ran Kozuch (Hebrew: רן קוז'וך; born 12 January 1981) is an Israeli former football player and current manager.

== Managerial stats ==
As of 6 May 2024

Team	Nat	From	To	Record				
Team	Nat	From	To	P	W	D	L	Win %
Maccabi Netanya (caretaker)	(Israel)	30 September 2021	3 October 2021	1	1	0	0	100.00
Maccabi Netanya	(Israel)	7 November 2022	20 December 2023	46	20	11	15	43.48
Maccabi Petah Tikva	(Israel)	4 January 2024		20	9	3	8	45.00
Total				67	30	14	23	44.78

== Honours ==
- Toto Cup:
  - Winner (1): 2022-23
- Israel State Cup:
  - Winner (2): 2024, 2025
  - Runner-up (2): 2023, 2026
- Israeli Premier League:
  - Winner (1): 2025–26
  - Runner-up (1): 2024-25
