= Turner Stadium =

Football stadium in Be'er Sheva, Israel

Coordinates: 31°16′23.34″N 34°46′45.7″E

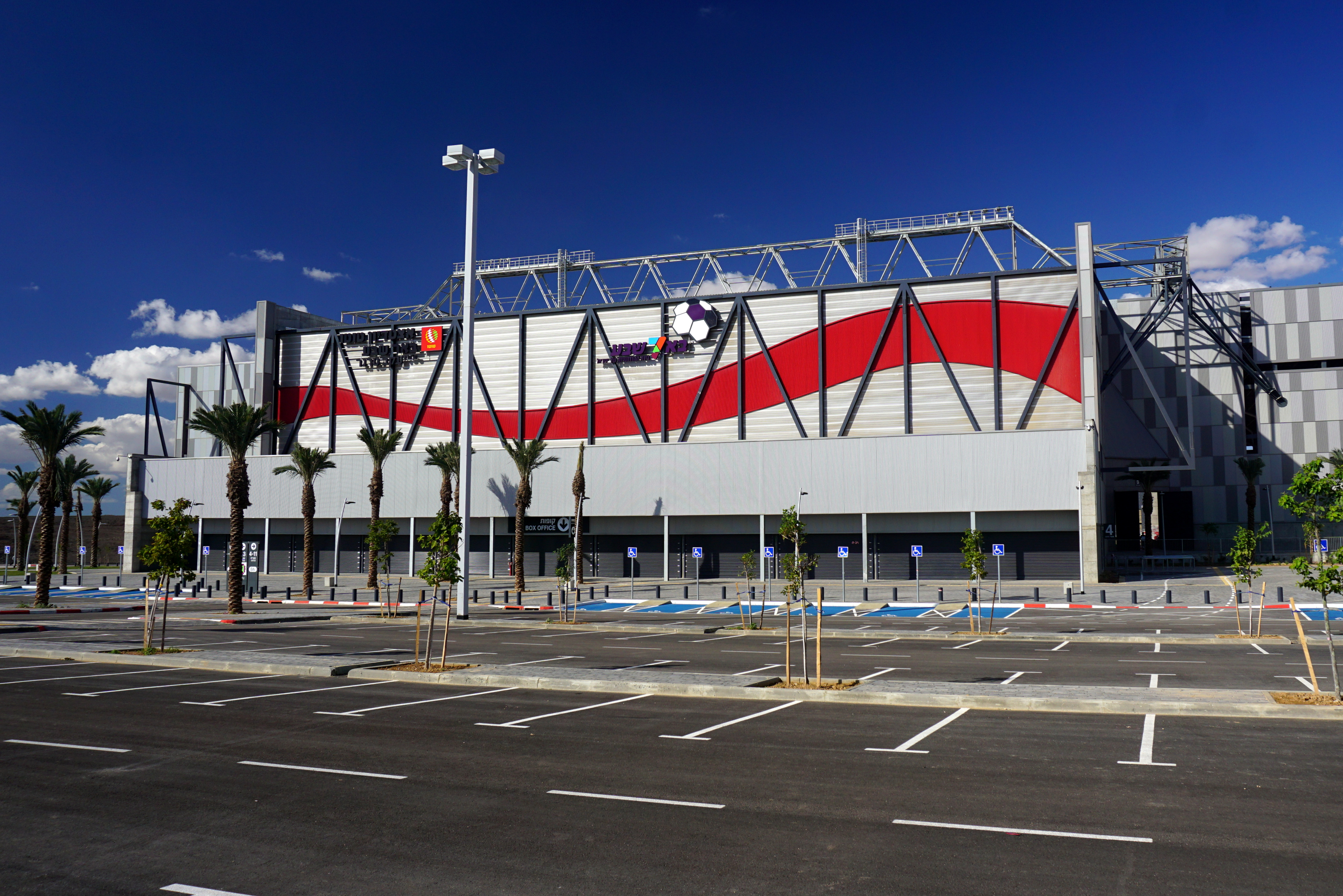
- UEFA
- Interactive map of Turner Stadium
- Full name: Yaakov Turner Toto Stadium Be'er Sheva
- Location: Be'er Sheva, Israel
- Owner: Be'er Sheva Municipality
- Operator: Be'er Sheva Municipality
- Capacity: 16,126
- Surface: Grass
- Field size: 22.000 Sq m

Construction
- Groundbreaking: August 2011
- Opened: September 2015
- Cost: ₪ 250 million

Tenants
- Hapoel Be'er Sheva (2015–present); Israel national football team (selected matches)

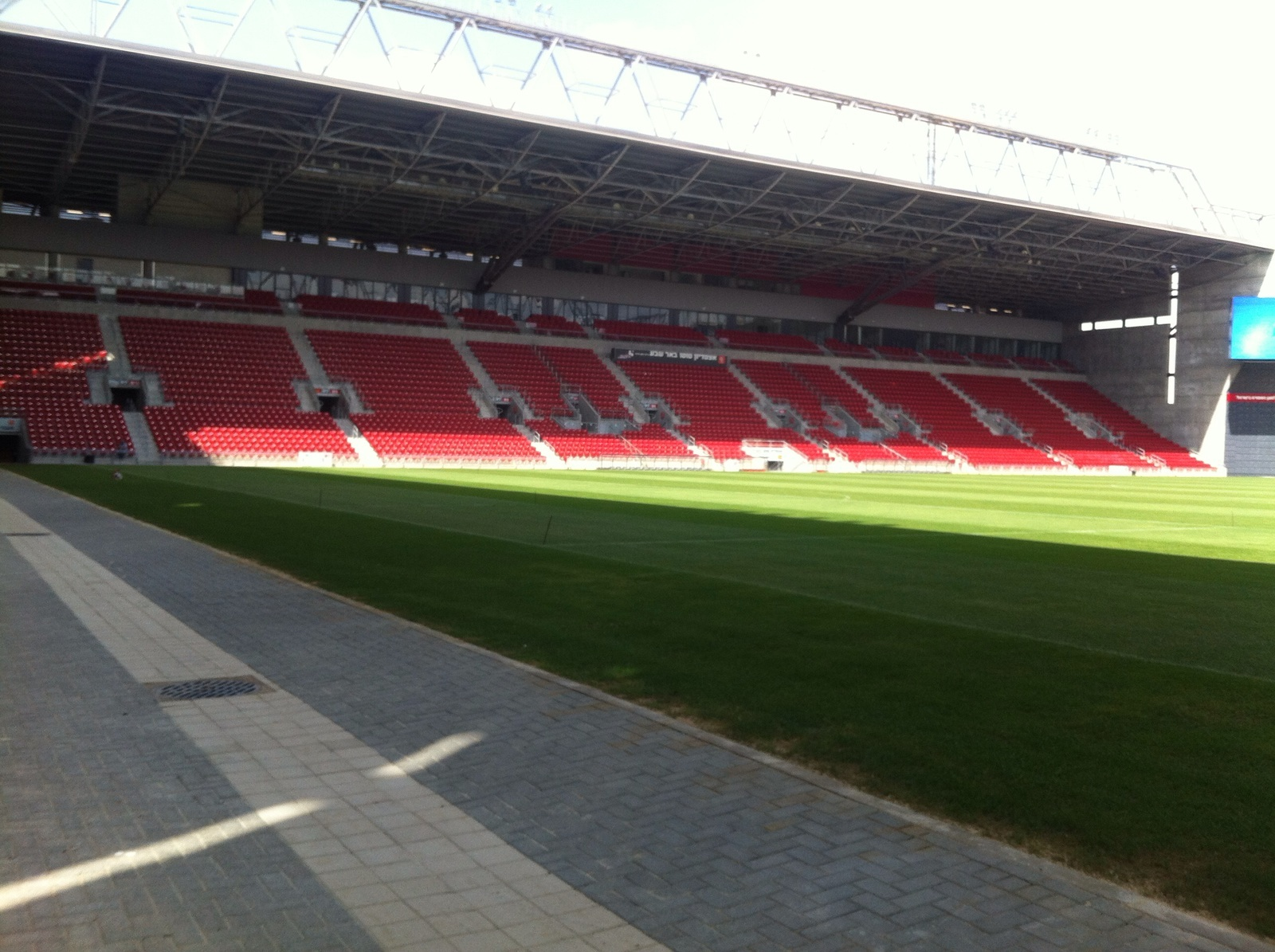
Turner Stadium of Beersheba. The newest stadium of the Israel national football team

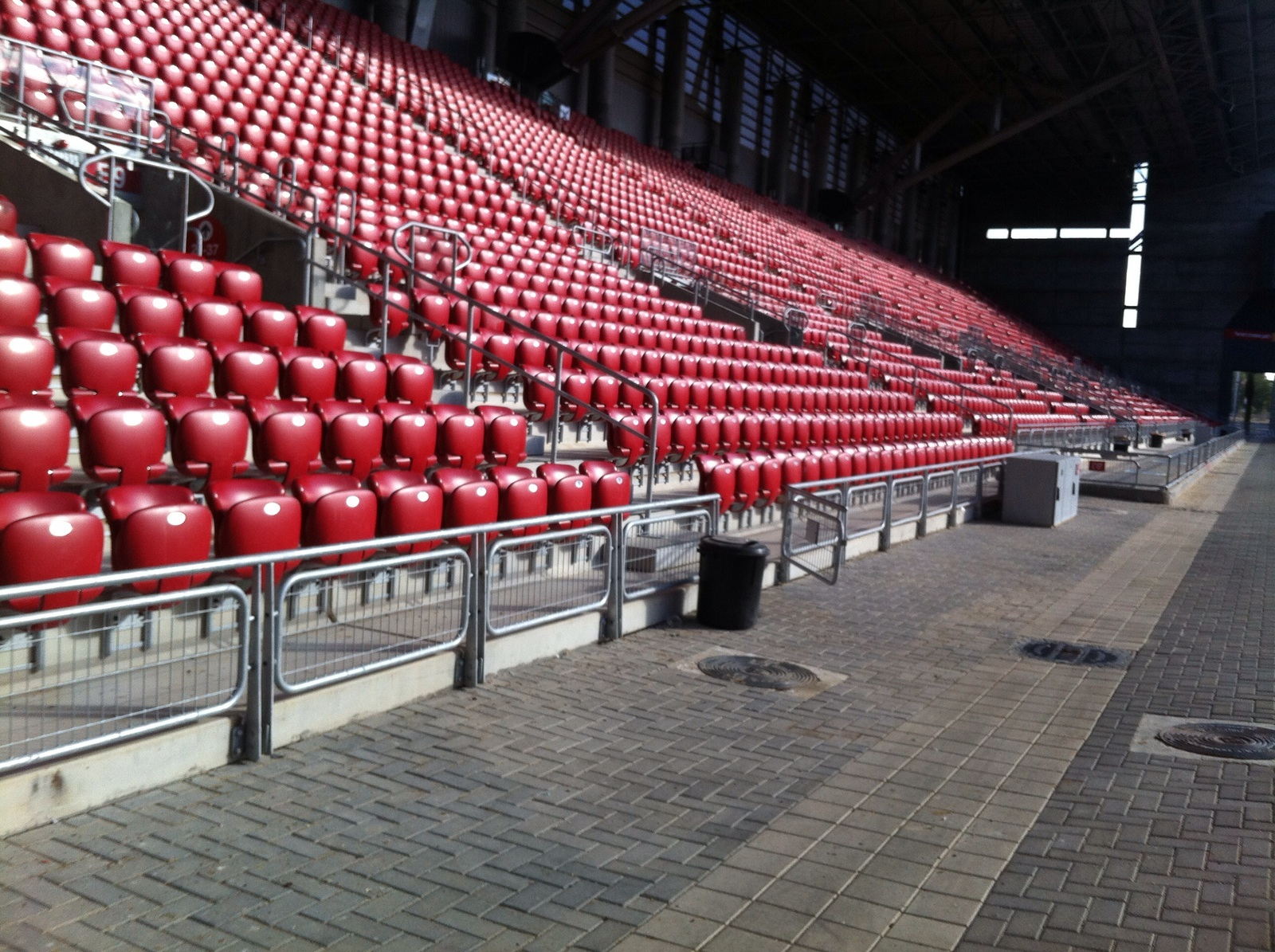
Team-colored seats

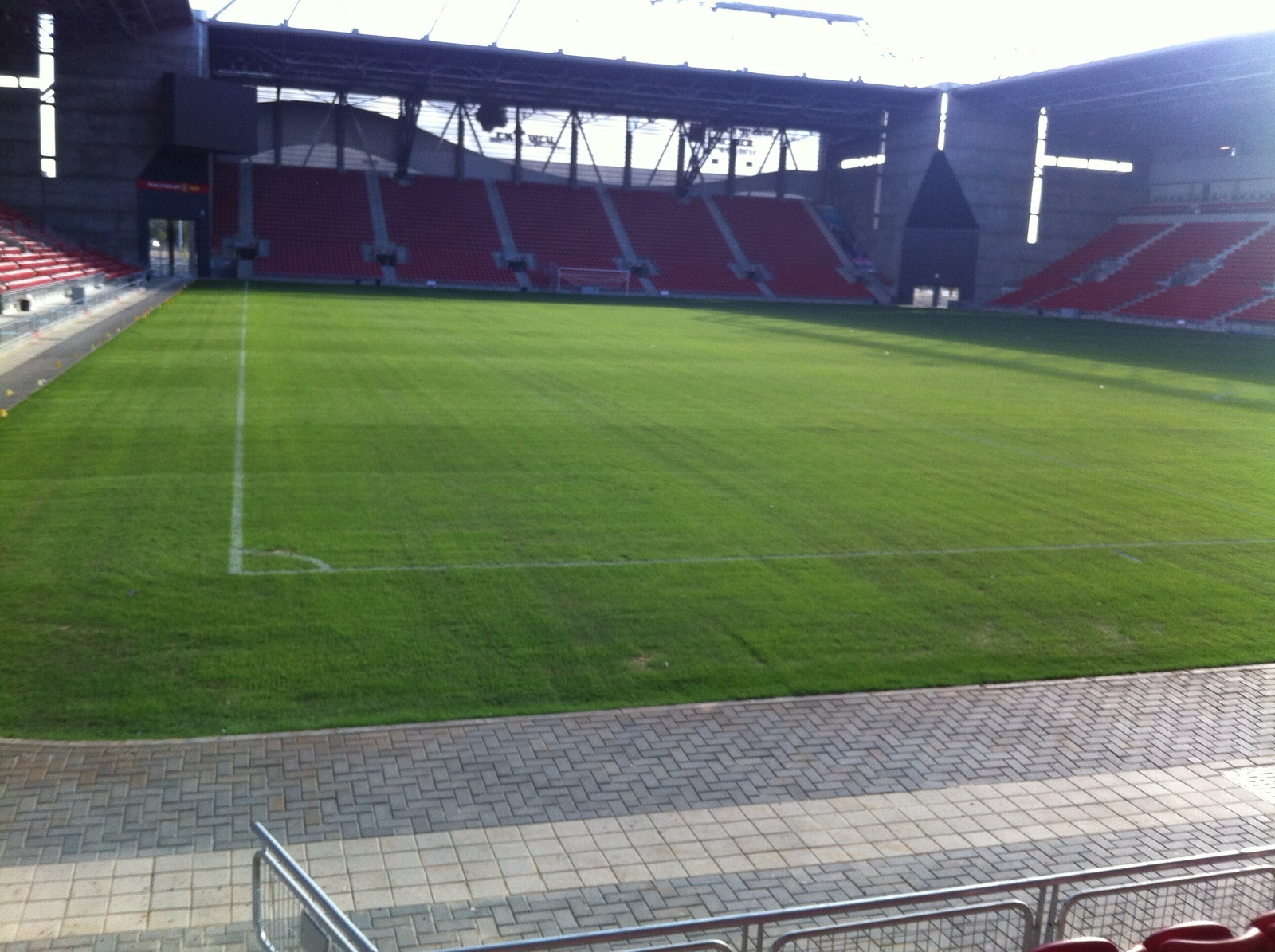
Turner Stadium of the city of Be'er Sheva, Israel

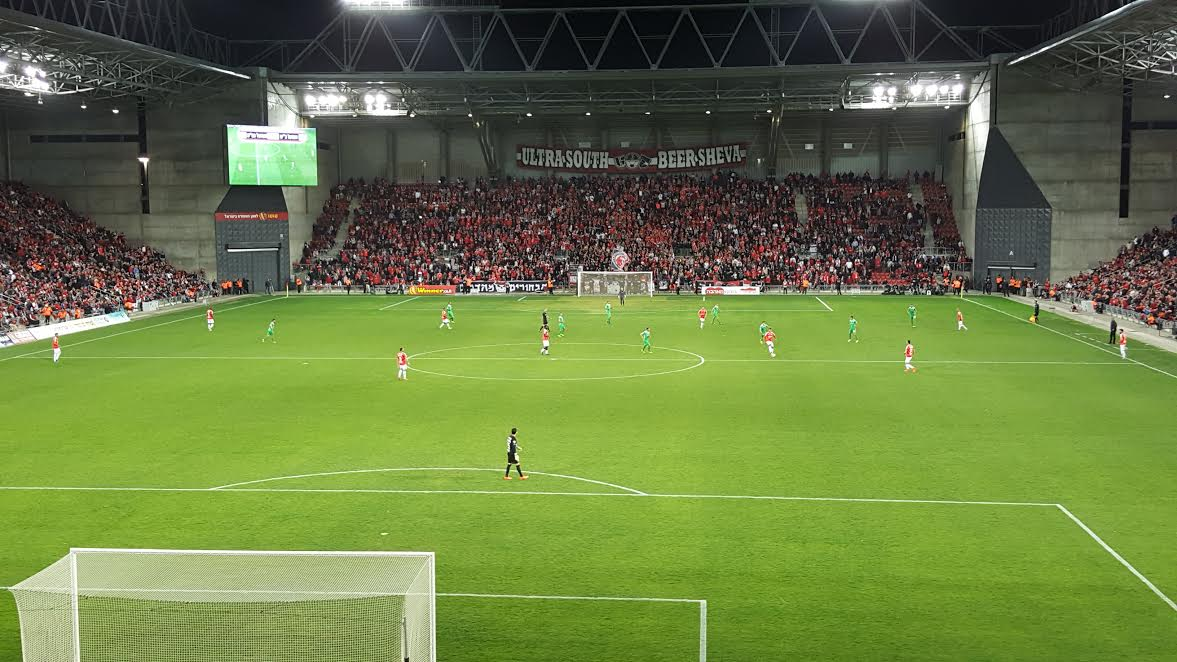
Hapoel Be'er Sheva during a match

The Turner Stadium (Hebrew: אצטדיון טרנר), officially the Yaakov Turner Toto Stadium Be'er Sheva, is a football stadium in Be'er Sheva, Israel. It is the home ground of Hapoel Be'er Sheva. It was named after former Be'er Sheva mayor Yaakov Turner. The stadium also serves the Israel national football team for some home matches.

== History ==
The stadium has an all-seated capacity of 16,126 seats, with the southern stand named after Arthur Vasermil, for whom the club's previous Vasermil Stadium was named. and is a part of a sports complex that also includes the multi-purpose 3,000-seat Conch Arena, a training ground and a swimming pool.

The stadium, located on the northern side of Be'er Sheva, opened during the early stages of the 2015–16 season, with the club selling a record 12,000 season tickets. However, as it was not ready for the start of the season, Hapoel were forced to play their first home match at the Teddy Stadium in Jerusalem. The first match at the ground was played on 21 September 2015, a 0–0 draw with Maccabi Haifa.

The first match of the Israel national football team was played on 14 October 2018. Israel hosted the Albania national football team in the 2018–19 UEFA Nations League match and won the match by a score of 2–0.

On 2 August 2020, the stadium was declared a dangerous building by the Beersheba municipality due to structural problems and was closed. On 3 August 2020 it was revealed that the structural problems included cracks in the support beams and loose bolts. The municipality announced it would sue the constructing company and said they would remove the stadium roof.

== International matches ==
Date		Result		Competition	Attendance
14 October 2018	Israel	2–0	Albania	2018–19 UEFA Nations League	14,950
5 September 2019	Israel	1–1	North Macedonia	UEFA Euro 2020 qualifying	15,200
15 October 2019	Israel	3–1	Latvia	UEFA Euro 2020 qualifying	9,150
12 October 2021	Israel	2–1	Moldova	2022 FIFA World Cup qualification	9,000

== See also ==
- Sports in Israel
