= 2025 Israel Super Cup =

Football match in Haifa, Israel

Maccabi Tel Aviv	Hapoel Be'er Sheva
1	2
- Date: 13 July 2025
- Venue: Bloomfield Stadium, Tel Aviv
- Referee: Gal Levi
- Attendance: 25,066

The 2025 Israel Super Cup was the 30th edition of the Israel Super Cup (35th, including unofficial matches (Note: The competition wasn't played within the Israel Football Association for its first 6 editions, until 1969.)), an annual Israeli football match played between the winners of the previous season's Israeli Premier League (Maccabi Tel Aviv) and the Israel State Cup (Hapoel Be'er Sheva). This was the ninth edition since the Super cup's resumption in 2015.

== Match details ==
13 July 2025
19:30

Maccabi Tel Aviv	1–2	Hapoel Be'er Sheva
Patati 62'	Report	13' Peretz; 77' Almog

Bloomfield Stadium, Tel Aviv
Attendance: 25,066
Referee: Gal Levi
