= 2024–25 Israel State Cup =

Tournament details
- Country: Israel
- Dates: 29 August 2024 – 29 May 2025
- Teams: 186

Final positions
- Champions: Hapoel Be'er Sheva (4th title)
- Runners-up: Beitar Jerusalem

Tournament statistics
- Matches played: 174
- Goals scored: 655 (3.76 per match)
- Top goal scorer: Sagi Dror (Hapoel Ramat Gan Givatayim) (7 Goals)

The 2024–25 Israel State Cup (Hebrew: גביע המדינה, Gvia HaMedina) (known as the Gvia HaMedina Winner for sponsorship purposes) was the 86th season of Israel's nationwide Association football cup competition and the 70th after the Israeli Declaration of Independence. The winners qualified for the 2025–26 UEFA Europa League second qualifying round.

== Preliminary rounds ==
=== Liga Bet ===
- Schedule:
- Results:

==== Liga Bet North A ====
First Round
5 September 2024
Hapoel Karmiel	2 (5)
Tzeirei Tamra	2 (4)
6 September 2024
Maccabu Bnei Jadeidi-Makr	2
Maccabi Ihud Bnei Ibtin	1
6 September 2024
Bnei Maghar	4
Ahi Acre	0
6 September 2024
Hapoel Bnei Bi'ina	1
Maccabi Abu Snan (a.e.t.)	4
6 September 2024
Hapoel Kaukab	0
Bnei M.M.B.E.	3

Second Round
31 October 2024
Hapoel Karmiel	3
Maccabu Bnei Jadeidi-Makr	1
Maccabi Abu Snan
Bnei M.M.B.E.	(w/o)

Third Round
Bnei M.M.B.E.	(w/o)
Bnei Maghar

Fourth Round
25 November 2024
Hapoel Karmiel	4
Bnei M.M.B.E.	0

Hapoel Karmiel and Bnei M.M.B.E. qualified to the sixth round

==== Liga Bet North B ====
First Round
6 September 2024
Hapeol Yaffa	0
F.C. Tirat HaCarmel	7
6 September 2024
Hapoel Bnei Ar'ara 'Ara	0
Hapoel Tirat HaCarmel	1
Maccabi Ahi Iksal
Beitar Haifa	(w/o)
6 September 2024
Hapoel Ramot Menashe Megiddo	1
Maccabi Neve Sha'anan Eldad	3
6 September 2024
Hapoel Sandala Gilboa	2
Maccabi Achva Fureidis	0
7 September 2024
Ihud Bnei Baqa	3
F.C. Tzeirei Haifa	2
6 September 2024
F.C. Tzofi Haifa	10
F.C. Bnei Qalansawe	1

Second Round
F.C. Tirat HaCarmel	(w/o)
Hapoel Tirat HaCarmel
1 November 2024
Beitar Haifa	1
Maccabi Neve Sha'anan Eldad	5
2 November 2024
Ihud Bnei Baqa	5
F.C. Tzofi Haifa	1

Third Round
5 November 2024
F.C. Tirat HaCarmel	1
Maccabi Neve Sha'anan Eldad	2
Hapoel Sandala Gilboa
Ihud Bnei Baqa	(w/o)

Fourth Round
25 November 2024
Maccabi Neve Sha'anan Eldad	7
Ihud Bnei Baqa	1

Maccabi Neve Sha'anan Eldad and Ihud Bnei Baqa qualified to the sixth round

==== Liga Bet South A ====
First Round
6 September 2024
Beitar Ramat Gan	0
Beitar Kfar Saba	2
5 September 2024
Ironi Beit Dagan	2
Hakoah Maccabi Amidar Ramat Gan	0
6 September 2024
F.C. Kfar Saba	4
Maccabi Amishav Petah Tikva	0
6 September 2024
Hapoel Kiryat Ono	5
Hapoel Kafr Qasim Shouaa	0
6 September 2024
Beitar Petah Tikva	3
Bnei Jaffa Ortodoxim	1
5 September 2024
Hapoel Bik'at HaYarden	3 (3)
Maccabi Giv'at Shmuel	3 (4)
6 September 2024
Beitar Tel Aviv	2
Hapoel Mahane Yehuda	4

Second Round
24 September 2024
Hapoel Hod HaSharon (a.e.t.)	6
Beitar Kfar Saba	3
24 September 2024
Ironi Beit Dagan	2
F.C. Kfar Saba	1
24 September 2024
Hapoel Kiryat Ono	1
Beitar Petah Tikva	0
24 September 2024
Hapoel Mahane Yehuda (a.e.t.)	3
Maccabi Giv'at Shmuel	1

Third Round
30 September 2024
Hapoel Hod HaSharon (a.e.t.)	2
Ironi Beit Dagan	1
8 October 2024
Hapoel Kiryat Ono	1
Hapoel Mahane Yehuda	2

Fourth Round
5 January 2025
Hapoel Hod HaSharon	5
Hapoel Mahane Yehuda	1

Hapoel Hod HaSharon and Hapoel Kiryat Ono qualified to the sixth round

==== Liga Bet South B ====
First Round
3 September 2024
Ironi Beit Shemesh	1 (4)
F.C. Sderot	1 (2)
Bnei Eilat	(w/o)
Maccabi Kiryat Gat
2 September 2024
F.C. Shikun HaMizrah	2
Beitar Yavne	1
5 September 2024
Beitar Ironi Kiryat Gat	1
F.C. Hapoel Bnei Ashdod	0
F.C. Hapoel Shaqib al-Salam	(w/o)
Maccabi Be'er Sheva
5 September 2024
Maccabi Ironi Netivot	1
F.C. Ramla (a.e.t.)	2

Second Round
24 September 2024
Bnei Eilat	0
Ironi Beit Shemesh	1
24 September 2024
F.C. Shikun HaMizrah	3
Beitar Ironi Kiryat Gat	0
23 September 2024
F.C. Hapoel Shaqib al-Salam	3
F.C. Ramla	2

Third Round
8 October 2024
Ironi Beit Shemesh (a.e.t.)	4
F.C. Shikun HaMizrah	1
9 October 2024
F.C. Hapeol Yeruham	0
F.C. Hapoel Shaqib al-Salam	5

Fourth Round
9 December 2024
Ironi Beit Shemesh	6
F.C. Hapoel Shaqib al-Salam	1

Ironi Beit Shemesh and F.C. Hapoel Shaqib al-Salam qualified to the sixth round

=== Liga Gimel ===
Sources:

- Schedule:
- Results:

==== Liga Gimel Galilee ====
First Round
F.C. Bnei Peki'in
Hapoel Bnei Jadeidi-Makr	(w/o)
Hapoel Nahaf
Hapoel Hurfeish	(w/o)
F.C. Hapeol Yarka
F.C. Beit Jann Rani	(w/o)

Second Round
10 September 2024
Hapoel Hurfeish	2
F.C. Beit Jann Rani	3

Third Round
18 September 2024
F.C. Beit Jann Rani	0
Hapoel Bnei Jadeidi-Makr	1

Hapoel Bnei Jadeidi-Makr won the district cup and advanced to the fifth round vs Hapoel Daliyat al-Karmel (Liga Gimel Bay)

==== Liga Gimel North ====
First Round
7 September 2024
Hapoel Tzirei Nazareth	3
Hapoel Bnei Tayibe	0
7 September 2024
Beitar Kafr Kanna Radwan	1
F.C. Kabul	0
Hapoel Bnei Ein Mahil
Ihud Tzeiri Iksal	(w/o)
Bnei Daburiyya
F.C. Al-Nahada Nazareth	(w/o)

Second Round
10 September 2024
Hapoel Tzirei Nazareth	3
Beitar Kafr Kanna Radwan	2
11 September 2024
F.C. Kfar Kama	3
Ihud Tzeiri Iksal	1

Third Round
17 September 2024
F.C. Kfar Kama (a.e.t.)	2
F.C. Al-Nahada Nazareth	1

Fourth Round
10 October 2024
Hapoel Tzirei Nazareth	2
F.C. Kfar Kama	1

Hapoel Tzirei Nazareth won the district cup and advanced to the fifth round vs F.C. Or Akiva (Liga Gimel Jezreel)

==== Liga Gimel Bay ====
First Round
6 September 2024
F.C. Kababir	2
Hapoel Kiryat Haim Leibovich	0
6 September 2024
F.C. Carmel Haifa	5
Beitar Kiryat Ata Kfir	0
6 September 2024
Hapoel Daliyat al-Karmel	2 (4)
Hapoel Bnei Jisr az-Zarqa	2 (3)
6 September 2024
Ahli Shfar'am Football
Maccabi Barkai	(w/o)

Second Round
10 September 2024
F.C. Kababir	2
F.C. Carmel Haifa	1
10 September 2024
Hapoel Daliyat al-Karmel	1
Maccabi Barkai	0

Third Round

Fourth Round
15 October 2024
F.C. Kababir	0
Hapoel Daliyat al-Karmel	2

Hapoel Daliyat al-Karmel won the district cup and advance to the fifth round vs Hapoel Bnei Jadeidi-Makr (Liga Gimel Galilee)

==== Liga Gimel Jezreel ====
First Round
6 September 2024
F.C. Or Akiva	4
Hapoel Ihud Bnei Jatt	1
6 September 2024
F.C. Pardes Hanna-Karkur Lior Boker	2
Beitar Umm al-Fahm	1
Hapoel Kfar Metzer
Hapoel Ein as-Sahla	(w/o)

Second Round
10 September 2024
F.C. Or Akiva	1
F.C. Pardes Hanna-Karkur Lior Boker	2

Third Round

Fourth Round
24 September 2024
F.C. Or Akiva	2
Hapoel Ein as-Sahla	0

F.C. Or Akiva won the district cup and advanced to the fifth round vs Hapoel Tzirei Nazareth (Liga Gimel Norte)

==== Liga Gimel Sharon ====
First Round
7 September 2024
Maccabi Ramat HaSharon	4
Hapoel Oranit	0
6 September 2024
Beitar Tubruk	5
Hapoel Pardesiya	0
7 September 2024
Ironi Rosh HaAyin	1
Maccabi HaSharon Netanya (a.e.t.)	2
6 September 2024
Bnei Tira	4
Hapoel Mateh Binyamin	0
6 September 2024
F.C. Ironi Ariel	2 (5)
Maccabi Ironi Kfar Yona	2 (4)

Second Round
10 September 2024
Bnei Jaljulia	2
Maccabi Ramat HaSharon	1
10 September 2024
Beitar Tubruk	2 (3)
Maccabi HaSharon Netanya	2 (4)
1 October 2024
Bnei Tira	1
F.C. Ironi Ariel	0

Third Round
25 September 2024
Bnei Jaljulia	1 (8)
Maccabi HaSharon Netanya	1 (9)

Fourth Round
25 October 2024
Maccabi HaSharon Netanya	0
Bnei Tira	2

Bnei Tira won the district cup and qualified to the sixth round.

==== Liga Gimel Dan ====
First Round
6 September 2024
F.C. Kiryat Ekron	1
Maccabi Bnei Abu Ghosh	3
7 September 2024
F.C. Tzeirei Lod	2 (2)
F.C. Or Yehuda	2 (4)
6 September 2024
F.C. Be'er Ya'akov Solomon	9
Ihud Tzeiri Abu Ghosh	2
6 September 2024
Hapoel Mevaseret Zion	1
Maccabi Yehud-Monosson	3
6 September 2024
Bnei Ramla	3 (4)
Maccabi Be'er Ya'akov Amit	3 (5)
6 September 2024
Bnei Yehud	3 (4)
Beitar Gedera	3 (5)

Second Round
10 September 2024
F.C. Be'er Ya'akov Solomon	2
F.C. Or Yehuda	1
9 September 2024
Maccabi Yehud-Monosson (a.e.t.)	2
Maccabi Be'er Ya'akov Amit	1
Beitar Gedera
F.C. Ness Ziona	(w/o)

Third Round
24 September 2024
Maccabi Bnei Abu Ghosh (a.e.t.)	3
F.C. Be'er Ya'akov Solomon	1
25 September 2024
Maccabi Yehud-Monosson	1
F.C. Ness Ziona	0

Fourth Round
15 October 2024
Maccabi Yehud-Monosson	5
Maccabi Bnei Abu Ghosh	1

Maccabi Yehud-Monosson won the district cup and qualified to the sixth round.

==== Liga Gimel Center ====
First Round
Maccabi Ironi Bat Yam
Hapoel Tzafririm Holon	(w/o)
6 September 2024
Maccabi Or Yehuda	3
Elitzur Jaffa Tel Aviv	5
4 September 2024
Elitzur Yehud Yutel	1
Hapoel Neve Golan	6
10 September 2024
Hakoah Galei Gil Ramat Gan	3
A.S. Holon Mor	1
5 September 2024
Maccabi Spartak Ramat Gan	2
Beitar Ezra	3
6 September 2024
Beitar Jaffa Tzion	7
Maccabi Pardes Katz	0
6 September 2024
Shikun Vatikim Ramat Gan	2 (3)
Maccabi HaShikma Ramat Hen	2 (5)
7 September 2024
Bnei Herzliya	6
F.C. Tel Aviv Tommy	1

Second Round
10 September 2024
Hapoel Tzafririm Holon	10
Elitzur Jaffa Tel Aviv	0
10 September 2024
Hakoah Galei Gil Ramat Gan	1
F.C. Dizngoff Tel Aviv	3
10 September 2024
Beitar Ezra	19
Beitar Jaffa Tzion	0
10 September 2024
Maccabi HaShikma Ramat Hen	0
Bnei Herzliya	1

Third Round
24 September 2024
Hapoel Tzafririm Holon	4
Hapoel Neve Golan	0
17 September 2024
Bnei Herzliya	2
Beitar Ezra	3

Fourth Round
24 February 2024
F.C. Dizngoff Tel Aviv	1
Beitar Ezra	0

Fifth Round
10 October 2024
Hapoel Tzafririm Holon	1 (5)
F.C. Dizngoff Tel Aviv	1 (6)

F.C. Dizngoff Tel Aviv won the district cup and qualified to the sixth round.

==== Liga Gimel South ====
First Round
6 September 2024
F.C. Arad	3
Bnei Yerucham Almog Dadon	0
Hapoel Rahat
Ironi Ashkelon	(w/o)
6 September 2024
Otzma Be'er Sheva	2
Maccabi Ironi Hura	6
F.C. Maccabi Ashkelon	(w/o)
F.C. Tzeiri Rahat
F.C. Be'er Sheva Shua Tal	(w/o)
Maccabi Gan Yavne
5 September 2024
Maccabi Ihud Bnei Kuseife	3
F.C. Be'er Sheva	0
F.C. Ashdod City
Hapoel Bnei Kuseife	(w/o)

Second Round
10 September 2024
Ironi Ashkelon	3
Maccabi Ironi Hura	2
10 September 2024
F.C. Maccabi Ashkelon	1
F.C. Be'er Sheva Shua Tal	3
Maccabi Ihud Bnei Kuseife	(w/o)
Hapoel Bnei Kuseife

Third Round
1 October 2024
F.C. Arad	2 (2)
Ironi Ashkelon	2 (4)
F.C. Be'er Sheva Shua Tal	(w/o)
Maccabi Ihud Bnei Kuseife

Fourth Round
15 October 2024
Ironi Ashkelon	5
F.C. Be'er Sheva Shua Tal	0

Ironi Ashkelon won the district cup and qualified to the sixth round.

=== Liga Gimel North Finals ===
==== Liga Gimel North vs Liga Gimel Jezreel ====
Home team	Score	Away team
22 September 2024
Hapoel Tzirei Nazareth	0–6	F.C. Or Akiva

F.C. Or Akiva qualified to the sixth round.

==== Liga Gimel Galilee vs Liga Gimel Bay ====
Home team	Score	Away team
25 September 2024
Hapoel Daliyat al-Karmel	3–0	Hapoel Bnei Jadeidi-Makr

Hapoel Daliyat al-Karmel qualified to the sixth round.

== Fifth round ==
Sources:

- Schedule:
- Results:

The fifth round was played within each division of Liga Alef, split into two regions (Liga Alef North and Liga Alef South). Maccabi Ata Bialik (North Division) and Hapoel Azor (South Division) received byes entered the seventh round.

=== Liga Alef North ===
Home team	Score	Away team
30 August 2024
Hapoel Ironi Arraba	0–0 (3–5 p)	Hapoel Migdal HaEmek
Hapoel Ironi Baqa al-Gharbiyye	5–1	Ihud Bnei Shefa-'Amr
Hapoel Bnei Zalafa	1–5	F.C. Kiryat Yam
F.C. Tzeirei Kafr Kanna	0–4	Ironi Nesher
F.C. Tzeirei Umm al-Fahm	2–1	F.C. Tira
Hapoel Beit She'an Massilot	1–0	Hapoel Kafr Kanna
31 August 2024
Maccabi Nujeidat	0–1 (a.e.t.)	Hapoel Bnei Musmus
2 September 2024
Maccabi Akhi Nazareth	6–0	Hapoel Bu'eine

=== Liga Alef South ===
Home team	Score	Away team
29 August 2024
Maccabi Yavne	3–0	Maccabi Ironi Ashdod
A.S. Nordia Jerusalem	2–0	Shimshon Kafr Qasim
F.C. Hapoel Lod Beni Regev	1–0	Maccabi Sha'arayim
Tzeirei Tira	0–1	Holon Yermiyahu
30 August 2024
F.C. Jerusalem	0–1	Hapoel Marmorek
Shimshon Tel Aviv	0–1	Ironi Modi'in
A.S. Ashdod	1–0	Hapoel Herzliya
Maccabi Kiryat Malakhi	1–3 (a.e.t.)	F.C. Dimona

== Sixth round ==
The 14 preliminary rounds winners (8 from Liga Bet and 6 from Liga Gimel), 16 fifth round winners (8 from each division) and the two remain teams received byes.

Sources:

- Schedule:
- Results:

Home team	Score	Away team
5 November 2024
Hapoel Beit She'an Massilot (3)	3–0	Hapoel Shaqib al-Salam (4)
8 November 2024
Hapoel Migdal HaEmek (3)	0–2	F.C. Kiryat Yam (3)
F.C. Or Akiva (5)	1–3	Ironi Nesher (3)
9 November 2024
Maccabi Akhi Nazareth (3)	2–3	Hapoel Daliyat al-Karmel (5)
11 November 2024
Holon Yermiyahu (3)	2–0	Hapoel Bnei Musmus (3)
A.S. Ashdod (3)	1–0	Hapoel Mahane Yehuda (4)
12 November 2024
Ironi Beit Shemesh (4)	1–2	Hapoel Lod Beni Regev (3)
Hapoel Karmiel (4)	3–2	Hapoel Marmorek (3)
13 November 2024
F.C. Dimona (3)	4–0	Bnei Tira (5)
14 November 2024
Bnei M.M.B.E. (4)	0–2	Ironi Ashkelon (5)
A.S. Nordia Jerusalem (3)	8–0	Maccabi Yehud-Monosson (5)
15 November 2024
Maccabi Neve Sha'anan Eldad (4)	1–0	F.C. Dizngoff Tel Aviv (5)
16 November 2024
Hapoel Azor (3)	1–3	Hapoel Ironi Baqa al-Gharbiyye (3)
Ihud Bnei Baqa (4)	0–2	F.C. Tzeirei Umm al-Fahm (3)
18 November 2024
Hapoel Hod HaSharon (4)	2–1 (a.e.t.)	Maccabi Yavne (3)
19 November 2024
Ironi Modi'in (3)	0–0 (4–3 p)	Maccabi Ata/Bialik (3)

== Seventh round ==
The 16 sixth round winners and 12 teams from the 2024–25 Liga Leumit entered the seventh round (Bnei Yehuda Tel Aviv, Hapoel Ramat Gan, Hapoel Kfar Shalem and Hapoel Acre received byes to the next round)

Home team	Score	Away team
28 November 2024
Maccabi Neve Sha'anan Eldad (4)	1–3	Hapoel Beit She'an Massilot (3)
Holon Yermiyahu (3)	0–2	F.C. Kiryat Yam (3)
F.C. Tzeirei Umm al-Fahm (3)	1–0	Ironi Nesher (3)
Ironi Ashkelon (5)	1–0	A.S. Ashdod (3)
29 November 2024
Hapoel Ramat HaSharon (2)	6–2	Hapoel Ironi Baqa al-Gharbiyye (3)
F.C. Dimona (3)	7–0	Hapoel Daliyat al-Karmel (5)
F.C. Kafr Qasim (2)	1–3	Hapoel Ra'anana (2)
Hapoel Umm al-Fahm (2)	2–1	Hapoel Kfar Saba (2)
Maccabi Jaffa (2)	1–2	Hapoel Tel Aviv (2)
1 December 2024
Hapoel Afula (2)	6–0	Hapoel Karmiel (4)
Hapoel Nof HaGalil (2)	2–3	A.S. Nordia Jerusalem (3)
Maccabi Herzliya (2)	1–0	Hapoel Lod Beni Regev (3)
Hapoel Rishon LeZion (2)	0–1	Ironi Modi'in (3)
Hapoel Petah Tikva (2)	5–0	Hapoel Hod HaSharon (4)

== Eighth round ==
The 14 seventh round winners, the four 2024–25 Liga Leumit teams given seventh round byes, and the 14 teams from the 2024–25 Israeli Premier League entered the eighth round.

Home team	Score	Away team
26 December 2024
F.C. Dimona (3)	0–4	Hapoel Be'er Sheva (1)
Bnei Sakhnin (1)	3–3 (4–2 p)	Ironi Modi'in (3)
Hapoel Ra'anana (2)	2–4	A.S. Nordia Jerusalem (3)
Maccabi Bnei Reineh(1)	3–0	Hapoel Kfar Shalem (2)
27 December 2024
Hapoel Haifa (1)	1–1 (5–3 p)	Hapoel Petah Tikva (2)
Hapoel Afula (2)	3–4 (a.e.t.)	F.C. Ashdod (1)
Hapoel Beit She'an Massilot (3)	1–2	Hapoel Hadera (1)
F.C. Tzeirei Umm al-Fahm (3)	0–2	Hapoel Acre (2)
Hapoel Nir Ramat HaSharon (2)	1–0	Maccabi Herzliya (2)
Hapoel Ramat Gan (2)	2–2 (6–5 p)	Bnei Yehuda Tel Aviv (2)
28 December 2024
Maccabi Petah Tikva (1)	2–0	Ironi Kiryat Shmona (1)
Ironi Tiberias (1)	0–2	Hapoel Tel Aviv (2)
Maccabi Tel Aviv (1)	3–0	Hapoel Jerusalem (1)
29 December 2024
Hapoel Umm al-Fahm (2)	0–2	Maccabi Netanya (1)
F.C. Kiryat Yam (3)	2–2 (4–5 p)	Beitar Jerusalem (1)
30 December 2024
Maccabi Haifa (1)	6–0	Ironi Ashkelon (5)

== Round of 16 ==
The 16 eighth round winners entered the round of 16.

Home team	Score	Away team
14 January 2025
Hapoel Acre (2)	0–1	Beitar Jerusalem (1)
Maccabi Petah Tikva (1)	1–1 (2–4 p)	Bnei Sakhnin (1)
Maccabi Haifa (1)	1–0	Maccabi Netanya (1)
15 January 2025
A.S. Nordia Jerusalem (3)	1–4	F.C. Ashdod (1)
Hapoel Be'er Sheva (1)	6–0	Hapoel Hadera (1)
Maccabi Tel Aviv (1)	1–2	Maccabi Bnei Reineh (1)
16 January 2025
Hapoel Haifa (1)	1–2	Hapoel Tel Aviv (2)
Hapoel Ramat Gan (2)	7–0	Hapoel Nir Ramat HaSharon (2)

== Quarter-finals ==
The 8 round of 16 winners were drawn on 19 January 2025.

Home team	Score	Away team
25 February 2025
F.C. Ashdod (1)	1–3	Maccabi Bnei Reineh (1)
Hapoel Ramat Gan (2)	0–2	Hapoel Tel Aviv (2)
27 February 2025
Hapoel Be'er Sheva (1)	2–0	Maccabi Haifa (1)
3 April 2025
Bnei Sakhnin (1)	0–3	Beitar Jerusalem (1)

== Semi-finals ==
Home team	Score	Away team
10 April 2025
Maccabi Bnei Reineh (1)	1–5	Beitar Jerusalem (1)
22 April 2025
Hapoel Tel Aviv (2)	1–5	Hapoel Be'er Sheva (1)

== Final ==
29 May 2025	Beitar Jerusalem	0–2	Hapoel Be'er Sheva	Tel Aviv
20:30		Report		Stadium: Bloomfield Stadium; Referee: Yigal Frid
