= 2025–26 Maccabi Haifa F.C. season =

Football season

Maccabi Haifa
2025–26 season
- President: Ya'akov Shahar
- Head coach: Barak Bakhar
- Stadium: Sammy Ofer
- Ligat Ha'Al: 5th
- State Cup: Semi-finals
- Toto Cup: 8th
- Conference League: Third qualifying round
- Top goalscorer: League: (Israel) Guy Melamed (15); All: (Israel) Guy Melamed (18)
- Highest home attendance: 29,395 vs Beitar Jerusalem (22 December 2025)
- Lowest home attendance: 244 vs Torpedo Zhodino-BelAZ (31 July 2025)
- Average home league attendance: 21,308
Home colours	Away colours	Third colours
- All statistics correct as of 1 November 2025.

The 2025–26 season is Maccabi Haifa's 68th season in the Israeli Premier League, and their 44th consecutive season in the top division of Israeli football.

== Squad ==
=== Squad information ===
N	Pos.	Nat.	Name	Age	Since	App	Goals	Ends	Transfer fee	Notes
2	RB	(Israel)	Zohar Zasano	24	2025/2026	11	0	2026/2027	Free	
3	CB	(Israel)	Sean Goldberg	31	2021/2022	182	4	2025/2026	Free	Second nationality:Italy
4	DM	(Niger)	Ali Mohamed (vice captain)	30	2021/2022	212	2	2026/2027	€1,400,000	Second nationality:Israel
7	RW	(Israel)	Silva Kangani	23	2025/2026	33	5	2028/2029	€1,100,000	Second nationality:Togo
8	LW	(Israel)	Dolev Haziza (captain)	33	2019/2020	258	44	2026/2027	€310,000	Second nationality:France
9	CF	(Jamaica)	Trivante Stewart	26	2025/2026	36	12	2025/2026	€1,500,000	
11	LW	(Curaçao)	Kenji Gorré	31	2025/2026	29	5	2026/2027	Free	Second nationality:Netherlands
14	RW	(Angola)	Manuel Benson	29	2025/2026	12	1	2026/2027	Free	Second nationality:Belgium
15	DM	(Israel)	Lior Kasa	20	2023/2024	16	0	2027/2028	€1,100,000	Second nationality:Ethiopia
16	LM	(United States)	Kenny Saief	32	2023/2024	91	8	2026/2027	Free	Second nationality:Israel
17	RW	(Israel)	Suf Podgoreanu	24	2019/2020	55	3	2025/2026	€300,000	Originally from youth system Second nationality:Romania
18	CF	(Israel)	Guy Melamed	33	2024/2025	46	22	2026/2027	1,500,000€	Second nationality:Lithuania
19	DM	(Israel)	Ethan Azoulay	24	2024/2025	70	10	2028/2029	€1,500,000	Second nationality:France
24	CB	(Romania)	Lisav Eissat	21	2025/2026	35	1	2028/2029	Youth system	Second nationality:Israel
25	RB	(Belgium)	Jelle Bataille	27	2025/2026	41	0	2027/2028	Free	
26	AM	(Israel)	Michael Ohana	30	2025/2026	21	3	2024/2025	Free	
27	LB	(France)	Pierre Cornud (vice captain)	29	2022/2023	117	1	2028/2029	€800,000	
28	AM	(Israel)	Daniel Darzi	19	2025/2026	6	0	2029/2030	Youth system	
29	LB	(Israel)	Yinon Fainegezict	19	2025/2026	26	0	2028/2029	Youth system	
30	CB	(Senegal)	Abdoulaye Seck (vice captain)	34	2022/2023	151	14	2025/2026	€400,000	
32	DM	(Israel)	Itay Solomon	19	2025/2026	2	0	2027/2028	Youth system	
32	CF	(Israel)	Liam Luski	17	2025/2026	3	0	2028/2029	Youth system	
35	CB	(Israel)	Noam Sztejfman	18	2025/2026	8	0	2027/2028	Youth system	
36	DM	(Israel)	Nevot Ratner	19	2025/2026	17	1	2028/2029	Youth system	
37	CB	(Israel)	Elad Amir	20	2024/2025	14	1	2029/2030	Youth system	
38	CF	(Israel)	Adam Grimberg	17	2025/2026	4	0	2026/2027	Youth system	
39	CF	(Israel)	Niv Gabay	19	2025/2026	8	2	2028/2029	Youth system	
40	GK	(Israel)	Shareef Kayouf	25	2023/2024	96	0	2028/2029	Youth system	
42	RB	(Israel)	Eylon Baruch	19	2024/2025	1	0	2029/2030	Youth system	
44	CB	(Brazil)	Pedrão	29	2024/2025	19	0	2027/2028	€1,300,000	
45	CM	(Ivory Coast)	Cédric Don	22	2025/2026	14	2	2029/2030	€1,300,000	
77	GK	(Israel)	Roee Fucs	27	2020/2021	3	0	2028/2029		
80	DM	(Nigeria)	Peter Agba	23	2025/2026	27	1	2027/2028	€1,200,000	
89	GK	(Ukraine)	Heorhiy Yermakov	24	2025/2026	38	0	2026/2027	€100,000	Second nationality:Israel
99	CF	(Serbia)	Đorđe Jovanović	27	2025/2026	20	3	2025/2026	Free	
	LB	(Israel)	Tomi Tsitoashvili	20	2025/2026	0	0	2028/2029	Youth system	

- Last updated: 23 May 2026
- Source: mhaifafc.com
- Ordered by squad number.

=== Current coaching staff ===
Position	Staff
Head coach	(Israel) Barak Bakhar
Assistant Coach	(Israel) Guy Tzarfati (Israel) Guy Weisinger (Israel) Adrian Rochet
Sport Director	(Israel) Lior Refaelov
Team Manager	(Israel) Gil Ofek
Physical trainer	(Israel) Dror Shimshon (Israel) Uri Harel (Israel) Gal Vaknin
Goalkeeping Coach	(Israel) Itay Zilpa
Head of Mental Development	(Israel) Elad Ashkenazi

=== Kits ===
- Supplier: Adidas
- Main Sponsor: Volvo
- Secondary Sponsor: Amram Avraham Group, Variety Israel

== Kits ==
Home	Home alt.	Away	Away alt.	Third

Goalkeeper 1	Goalkeeper 2	Goalkeeper 3	Goalkeeper 4

== New contracts and transfers ==
=== New contracts ===
Date	Pos.	Player	Age	Expires	Source
9 June 2025	CB	(Israel) Tomer Lannes Arbel	20	June 2029	
11 June 2025	CM	(Israel) Yarin Levi	21	June 2028	
26 November 2025	AM	(Israel) Daniel Darzi	19	June 2030	
1 December 2025	LB	(Israel) Yinon Fainegezict	19	June 2029	
4 January 2026	CB	(Israel) Elad Amir	20	June 2030	
7 January 2026	DM	(Israel) Nevot Ratner	19	June 2029	
29 January 2026	CF	(Israel) Liam Luski	17	June 2029	
1 February 2026	CF	(Israel) Niv Gabay	19	June 2029	
12 February 2026	CB	(Romania) Lisav Eissat	21	June 2029	

=== Transfers in ===
Date	Pos.	Player	Age	From	Fee	Source
25 June 2025	AM	(Israel) Michael Ohana	30	(Israel) Ironi Tiberias	Free	
27 June 2025	LB	(France) Pierre Cornud	29	(France) Saint-Étienne	€850,000	
17 July 2025	CF	(Jamaica) Trivante Stewart	26	(Serbia) Radnički Niš	€1,500,000	
17 July 2025	LW	(Curaçao) Kenji Gorré	31	(Qatar) Umm Salal	Free	
17 July 2025	RB	(Belgium) Jelle Bataille	27	(Belgium) Royal Antwerp	Free	
21 July 2025	LB	(Israel) Daniel Joulani	27	(Israel) Maccabi Petah Tikva	€17,900	
3 September 2025	RB	(Israel) Zohar Zasno	24	(Israel) Beitar Jerusalem	Swap deal	
3 September 2025	RW	(Israel) Silva Kangani	23	(Israel) Beitar Jerusalem	Swap deal + €1,100,000	
12 September 2025	DM	(Nigeria) Peter Agba	23	(Slovenia) Olimpija Ljubljana	€1,200,000	
18 January 2026	CM	(Ivory Coast) Cédric Don	23	(Israel) Hapoel Jerusalem	€1,300,000	
30 January 2026	RW	(Angola) Manuel Benson	29	(England) Burnley	Free	

=== Loans in ===
Date	Position	Player	Age	From	Fee	Source
4 July 2025	CF	(Serbia) Đorđe Jovanović	27	(Switzerland) FC Basel	Free	

=== Loans return ===
Date	Position	Player	Age	From	Fee	Source
5 June 2025	CB	(Israel) Lisav Eissat	21	(Israel) Hapoel Hadera	Free	
5 June 2025	LW	(Israel) Suf Podgoreanu	24	(Netherlands) Heracles	Free	
5 June 2025	DM	(Israel) Lior Kasa	20	(Italy) Genoa	Free	
5 June 2025	DM	(Israel) Goni Naor	27	(Israel) Hapoel Tel Aviv	Free	
6 June 2025	GK	(Ukraine) Heorhiy Yermakov	24	(Ukraine) Oleksandriya	Free	
11 February 2026	LB	(Israel) Tomi Tsitoashvili	20	(Israel) Hapoel Kfar SabA	€50,000	

=== Transfers out ===
Date	Pos.	Player	Age	Type	To	Fee	Source
20 May 2025	LW	(Israel) Lior Refaelov	40	Retired			
10 June 2025	RB	(Israel) Maor Kandil	32	End of Contract	(Israel) Bnei Yehuda Tel Aviv	Free	
10 June 2025	GK	(Argentina) Tomás Sultani	28	End of Contract	(Argentina) Tigre	Free	
17 June 2025	DM	(Israel) Mahmoud Jaber	26	Transfer	(France) Saint-Étienne	€2,000,000	
24 June 2025	LB	(Democratic Republic of the Congo) Vital Nsimba	33	Release		Free	
15 June 2025	CF	(Germany) Erik Shuranov	24	Release	(Germany) FC Schweinfurt	Free	
31 June 2025	CB	(Israel) Rami Gershon	38	Retired			
1 July 2025	AM	(Israel) Ziv Ben Shimol	22	Transfer	(Israel) Beitar Jerusalem	€88,000	
6 July 2025	CF	(Israel) Dean David	30	Transfer	(Japan) Yokohama Marinos	€1,300,000	
14 July 2025	CB	(Croatia) Lorenco Šimić	30	Release	(Italy) Avellino	Free	
3 August 2025	AM	(Israel) Dia Saba	33	Transfer	(Turkey) Amedspor	€700,000	
3 September 2025	RB	(Israel) Roey Elimelech	24	Swap deal	(Israel) Beitar Jerusalem	Free	
3 September 2025	LW	(Israel) Ilay Hagag	24	Swap deal	(Israel) Beitar Jerusalem	Free	

=== Loans out ===
Date	Pos.	Player	Age	To	Fee	Source
11 June 2025	CM	(Israel) Yarin Levi	21	(Israel) Beitar Jerusalem	Free	
21 July 2025	LB	(Israel) Daniel Joulani	27	(Israel) Ironi Tiberias	Free	
5 June 2025	RB	(Israel) Getachew Yabelo	21	(Israel) Hapoel Kfar Saba	Free	
5 June 2025	CB	(Israel) Moran Waheb	20	(Israel) Hapoel Kfar Saba	Free	
27 July 2025	CM	(Israel) Itay Ehud	19	(Israel) Hapoel Kfar Saba	Free	
1 September 2025	RW	(Curaçao) Xander Severina	25	(Portugal) Casa Pia	Free	
1 September 2025	DM	(Israel) Liam Hermesh	22	(Moldova) Sheriff Tiraspol	Free	
18 September 2025	LW	(Israel) Eyad Khlaily	20	(Israel) Maccabi Bnei Reineh	Free	
5 December 2025	DM	(Israel) Tomer Lannes Arbel	20	(Israel) Hapoel Kfar Saba	Free	
5 December 2025	CF	(Israel) Omer Dahan	21	(Israel) Hapoel Ra'anana	Free	
19 January 2026	DM	(Israel) Goni Naor	27	(Greece) Athlitiki Enosi Larissa	Free	
28 January 2026	LW	(Spain) Matías Nahuel	29	(Poland) Jagiellonia Białystok	Free	

=== End of loan ===
Date	Pos.	Player	Age	To	Fee	Source
5 June 2025	CF	(Brazil) Ricardinho	25	(Czech Republic) FC Viktoria Plzeň	Free	
31 June 2025	CB	(Ukraine) Oleksandr Syrota	26	(Ukraine) Dynamo Kyiv	Free	

== Pre-season and friendlies ==
3 July 2025	Maccabi Haifa (Israel)	1–0	(Hungary) Budapest Honvéd
18:30 (19:30 IDT)	David 80' (pen.)	Report

6 July 2025	Maccabi Haifa (Israel)	1–3	(Hungary) Diósgyőri	Felcsút
18:00 (19:00 IDT)	Seba 35'	Report	11' Šaponjić; 45' Acolatse; 63' Gera	Stadium: Pancho Aréna

9 July 2025	Maccabi Haifa (Israel)	2–0	(Hungary) Győri	Győr
18:30 (19:30 IDT)	Haziza 14'; Seck 17'	Report		Stadium: ETO Park

15 July 2025	Maccabi Haifa	2–0	Hapoel Acre	Kfar Galim
17:30	Cornud 25'; Seba 50'			Stadium: Kfar Galim Training Ground

20 November 2025	Maccabi Haifa	2–1	Hapoel Acre	Kfar Galim
	Melamed 25'; Ohana 78'	Report	65' Twizer	Stadium: Kfar Galim Training Ground

== Competitions ==
=== Overview ===
Competition	First match	Last match	Starting round	Final position	Record							
Competition	First match	Last match	Starting round	Final position	Pld	W	D	L	GF	GA	GD	Win %
Ligat Ha'Al	23 August 2025	May 2026	Matchday 1	5th	36	15	10	11	66	47	+19	41.67
State Cup	27 December 2025	15 April 2026	Round of 32	Semi-finals	4	3	0	1	13	4	+9	75.00
Toto Cup	19 July 2025	17 August 2025	European qualification route	8th	2	0	0	2	0	4	−4	0.00
UEFA Europa Conference League	24 July 2025	14 August 2025	Second qualifying round	Third qualifying round	4	2	1	1	5	3	+2	50.00
Total					46	20	11	15	84	58	+26	43.48

Last updated: 23 May 2026
Source: Competitions

== Ligat Ha'Al ==
=== Regular season ===
==== Regular season table ====
Pos	Team	Pld	W	D	L	GF	GA	GD	Pts	Qualification
3	Maccabi Tel Aviv	26	14	7	5	55	32	+23	49	Qualification for the Championship round
4	Hapoel Tel Aviv	26	15	6	5	46	26	+20	49 (Note: Hapoel Tel Aviv had 2 points deducted following riot in Maccabi Tel Aviv match.)	Qualification for the Championship round
5	Maccabi Haifa	26	11	9	6	50	28	+22	42	Qualification for the Championship round
6	Hapoel Petah Tikva	26	9	10	7	41	36	+5	37	Qualification for the Championship round
7	Maccabi Netanya	26	10	5	11	45	55	−10	35	Qualification for the Relegation round

Source: Soccerway
Rules for classification: 1) Points; 2) Goal difference; 3) Matches won; 4) Goals scored; 5) Head-to-head points; 6) Head-to-head goal difference; 7) Head-to-head goals scored; 8) Play-off.

=== Regular season matches ===
Win Draw Loss

23 August 2025 1	Maccabi Haifa	4–0	Maccabi Bnei Reineh	Haifa
20:30	Jovanović 29'; Naor (yellow card) 35'; Haziza 51' (pen.); Stewart 69'; Nahuel 77'	Report	(yellow card) 16' Amos; (yellow card) 17' Sefer; (yellow card) 23' Stevanović	Stadium: Sammy Ofer Stadium; Attendance: 22,346; Referee: Gal Leibovich

31 August 2025 2	Beitar Jerusalem	0–0	Maccabi Haifa	Jerusalem
20:30	Atzili (yellow card) 7'; Zasno (red card) 9'; Carabalí (yellow card) 45'; Zargari (yellow card) 90+7'	Report	(yellow card) 23' Naor; (yellow card) 66' Mohamed; (yellow card) 90+1' Stewart	Stadium: Teddy Stadium; Attendance: 27,000; Referee: Snir Levi

15 September 2025 3	Maccabi Haifa	5–1	F.C. Ashdod	Haifa
20:00	Stewart 8'; Nahuel 39' (pen.), (yellow card) 77'; Haziza 53' (pen.); Seck 85'; Jovanović 90+1' (pen.)	Report	(yellow card) 23', (goal) 31' Tamam; (yellow card) 47' Gethon; (yellow card) 56' Ansah; (yellow card) 77' Muche; (yellow card) 90' Awany	Stadium: Sammy Ofer Stadium; Attendance: 25,524; Referee: Sapir Berman

21 September 2025 4	Hapoel Haifa	1–1	Maccabi Haifa	Haifa
20:30	Nawi (yellow card) 5'; Malul (yellow card) 6'; Zikri 33'; Hatuel (yellow card) 87'; Diba (yellow card) 90+1'	Report	14' Stewart; (yellow card) 33' Podgoreanu; (yellow card) 54' Goldberg; (yellow card) 56' Haziza	Stadium: Sammy Ofer Stadium; Attendance: 21,570; Referee: Gal Levi

29 September 2025 5	Maccabi Haifa	0–1	Hapoel Be'er Sheva	Haifa
20:30	Eissat (yellow card) 61'; Kasa (yellow card) 69'	Report	(yellow card) 45+1' Mizrahi; 62' Biton; (yellow card) 72' Kangwa; (yellow card) 85' Peretz	Stadium: Sammy Ofer Stadium; Attendance: 28,880; Referee: Aviad Shiloach

5 October 2025 6	Maccabi Tel Aviv	1–1	Maccabi Haifa	Tel Aviv
20:30	Belić (yellow card) 7'; Noy 47'; Camara (yellow card) 75'; Mishpati (yellow card) 90+2'	Report	(yellow card) 34' Eissat; (yellow card) 54' Seck; (yellow card) 56' Cornud; 90+2' (pen.) Jovanović	Stadium: Bloomfield Stadium; Attendance: 25,101; Referee: Ygal Frid

18 October 2025 7	Maccabi Haifa	2–3	Maccabi Netanya	Haifa
20:00	Haziza 15' (pen.); Azoulay (yellow card) 45+3'; Eissat (yellow card) 51'; Saief 58'; Jovanović (penalty missed) 89	Report	(yellow card) 58', (goal) 64' Keller; 60' Levi; 90+7' (pen.) Davó	Stadium: Sammy Ofer Stadium; Attendance: 26,283; Referee: Snir Levi

25 October 2025 8	Ironi Tiberias	1–1	Maccabi Haifa	Nof HaGalil
19:30	Usman (yellow card) 10'; Abu Akel (yellow card) 74'; Joulani (yellow card) 90'; Hadida 90+6'	Report	(yellow card) 5' Haziza; 21' Stewart; (yellow card) 90+6' Jovanović	Stadium: Barel Stadium; Attendance: 4,722; Referee: Ohad Asulin

1 November 2025 9	Maccabi Haifa	2–2	Hapoel Jerusalem	Haifa
15:00	Mohamed (yellow card) 32'; Jovanović (yellow card) 41'; Stewart 50', 59' (pen.); Seck (yellow card) 90+4'	Report	(yellow card) 56' Idoko; 70' Awaka Ashta; 90+5' Madmon	Stadium: Sammy Ofer Stadium; Attendance: 28,134; Referee: Orel Grinfeld

8 November 2025 10	Bnei Sakhnin	3–3	Maccabi Haifa	Sakhnin
17:30	Cudjoe 35'; Gantous (yellow card) 41'; Shamir 60'; Salman 90' (pen.); Dramé (yellow card) 90'	Report	(yellow card) 34' Bataille; 50' (pen.), 56' (pen.) Stewart; (yellow card) 70' Mohamed; (yellow card) 73' (yellow-red card) 90+4' Ohana; (yellow card) 88' Agba	Stadium: Doha Stadium; Attendance: 4,539; Referee: Snir Levi

29 November 2025 11	Hapoel Petah Tikva	0–0	Maccabi Haifa	Petah Tikva
19:30	Ta Bi (yellow card) 45+2'; Nadav Nidam (yellow card) 79'	Report	(yellow card) 5' Fainegezict; (red card) 31' Stewart; (yellow card) 35' Azoulay; (yellow card) 79' Mohamed; (yellow card) 81' Yermakov	Stadium: HaMoshava Stadium; Referee: Yoav Mizrahi

2 December 2025 12	Maccabi Haifa	2–1	Hapoel Tel Aviv	Haifa
20:30	Haziza 51' (pen.); Melamed 58'; Darzi (yellow card) 66'	Report	Alkukin (yellow card) 70'; Korine 88'	Stadium: Sammy Ofer Stadium; Attendance: 25,642; Referee: Orel Grinfeld

6 December 2025 13	Ironi Kiryat Shmona	0–1	Maccabi Haifa	Netanya
19:30	Bangoura (yellow card) 44'; Abu Rumi (yellow card) 46'; Daniel Tenenbaum (yellow card) 72'; Ben David (yellow card) 84'	Report	(yellow card) 80' Gorré; 90+8' Saief	Stadium: Netanya Stadium; Attendance: 6,858; Referee: Yoni Klez

14 December 2025 14	Maccabi Bnei Reineh	0–4	Maccabi Haifa	Nof HaGalil
20:15	Pejić (red card) 20'; Ganayem (yellow card) 63'	Report	15', 69' Melamed; (yellow card) 29' (yellow-red card) 73' Bataille; (yellow card) 54' Ohana; 44' Saief; 64' (pen.) Azoulay	Stadium: Barel Stadium; Attendance: 3,469; Referee: Idan Leiba

22 December 2025 15	Maccabi Haifa	1–2	Beitar Jerusalem	Haifa
20:30	Azoulay (yellow card) 5'; Cornud (yellow card) 49'; Eissat (yellow card) 55'; Gorré 83'	Report	(yellow card) 67' Cohen; 79' (pen.) Atzili; (yellow card) 90+1' Muzie; 90+6' Ben Shimol	Stadium: Sammy Ofer Stadium; Attendance: 29,395; Referee: David Foxman

31 December 2025 16	F.C. Ashdod	0–4	Maccabi Haifa	Ashdod
19:45	Meir (yellow card) 15'; Ansah (yellow card) 73'	Report	29' Kangani; 43' Agba; 58', (yellow card) 69' Gorré; 79' Haziza	Stadium: Yud-Alef Stadium; Attendance: 4,617; Referee: Gal Leibovich

5 January 2026 17	Maccabi Haifa	2–0	Hapoel Haifa	Haifa
20:30	Ethan Azoulay 35'; Melamed 45+11'; Gorré (yellow card) 63'	Report	(yellow card) 23' Diba; (red card) 25' Gomes; (yellow card) 45' Arbel	Stadium: Sammy Ofer Stadium; Attendance: 27,794; Referee: Orel Grinfeld

10 January 2026 18	Hapoel Be'er Sheva	0–0	Maccabi Haifa	Be'er Sheva
20:00	Cornud	Report	(yellow card) 13' Ventura; (yellow card) 60' Mizrahi; (yellow card) 71' Peretz; (yellow card) 85' Vítor; (yellow card) 90+1' Blorian; (yellow card) 90+2' Ahmed	Stadium: Turner Stadium; Attendance: 15,260; Referee: Aviv Klein

18 January 2026 19	Maccabi Haifa	4–1	Maccabi Tel Aviv	Haifa
20:30	Saief (yellow card) 29'; Ohana 45+3'; Melamed 79'; Gorré 81'; Gabay 88'	Report	(yellow card) 25' Sissokho; (yellow card) 32' Andrade; 52' Yehezkel; (yellow card) 56' Varela	Stadium: Sammy Ofer Stadium; Attendance: 28,869; Referee: Gal Leibovich

24 January 2026 20	Maccabi Netanya	4–1	Maccabi Haifa	Netanya
15:00	Levi 3'; Ouattara (yellow card) 19'; Diomandé (yellow card) 26'; Tavares 45+2', 54'; Davó (yellow card) 68'; Bilu (yellow card) 79'; Zarora 90'	Report	7' Kangani; (yellow card) 39' (yellow-red card) 77' Cornud; (yellow card) 66' Eissat; (yellow card) 88' Agba	Stadium: Netanya Stadium; Attendance: 11,367; Referee: Ygal Frid

31 January 2026 21	Maccabi Haifa	3–2	Ironi Tiberias	Haifa
19:30	Melamed 23'; Saief 35'; Gorré (yellow card) 69', (goal) 82'	Report	5' Habiballah; (yellow card) 33' Samba: (yellow card) 43' Abu Akel; 64' Joulani: (red card) 89' Teper	Stadium: Sammy Ofer Stadium; Attendance: 24,104; Referee: Omer Biran

7 February 2026 22	Hapoel Jerusalem	1–1	Maccabi Haifa	Jerusalem
17:30	Rakonjac 15'; Ashta (red card) 22'; Agvadish (yellow card) 87'	Report	75' Stewart	Stadium: Teddy Stadium; Attendance: 7,562; Referee: David Foxman

15 February 2026 23	Maccabi Haifa	4–0	Bnei Sakhnin	Haifa
20:15	Eissat 5'; Don 21'; Ohana 45+1'; Melamed 50'	Report	(yellow card) 52' Sheikh Yousef; (yellow card) 56' Miranyan	Stadium: Sammy Ofer Stadium; Attendance: 22,432; Referee: Tal Carmeli

21 February 2026 24	Maccabi Haifa	0–1	Hapoel Petah Tikva	Haifa
17:30	Cédric Don (yellow card) 10'; Bataille (yellow card) 25'; Haziza (yellow card) 81'		(yellow card) 23' Rotman; 59' Diarra	Stadium: Sammy Ofer Stadium; Attendance: 27,120; Referee: Aviad Shiloach

6 April 2026 25	Hapoel Tel Aviv	2–0	Maccabi Haifa	Tel Aviv
20:30	Turiel 63' (pen.); Coco (yellow card) 72'; Loizou 87' (pen.)	Report	(yellow card) 7' Feingezicht; (yellow card) 40' Haziza; (red card) 46' Ratner; (yellow card) 63' Yermakov; (yellow card) 87' Azoulay	Stadium: Bloomfield Stadium; Attendance: 0 (Note: Played Behind closed doors due to the 2026 Iran war); Referee: Nael Odeh
Note: originally scheduled for 2 March 2026 due to the 2026 Iran war The league was postponed indefinitely.

12 April 2026 26	Maccabi Haifa	4–1	Ironi Kiryat Shmona	Haifa
20:00	Azoulay (yellow card) 9'; Melamed 30', 86'; Benson 36'	Report	(yellow card) 17' Ben David; (yellow card) 86' Pacheco; (yellow card) 90+4' Avraham; 35' Ugarriza	Stadium: Sammy Ofer Stadium; Attendance: 0 Referee: Ohad Asulin
Note: originally scheduled for 7 March 2026 due to the 2026 Iran war The league was postponed indefinitely.

=== Championship round ===
==== Championship round table ====
Pos	Team	Pld	W	D	L	GF	GA	GD	Pts	Qualification	HBS	BEI	MTA	HTA	MHA	HPT
2	Beitar Jerusalem	36	22	10	4	78	40	+38	76	Qualification for the Conference League second qualifying round	1–1	—	4–2	1–1	3–0	3–1
3	Maccabi Tel Aviv	36	19	9	8	72	46	+26	66	Qualification for the Europa League second qualifying round (Note: The 2025–26 Israel State Cup winners (Maccabi Tel Aviv) qualify for the Europa League second qualifying round.)	1–0	1–2	—	1–0	3–0	4–0
4	Hapoel Tel Aviv	36	18	8	10	55	35	+20	60 (Note: Hapoel Tel Aviv had 2 points deducted following riot in Maccabi Tel Aviv match.)	Qualification for the Conference League second qualifying round	0–2	0–1	1–1	—	4–0	1–0
5	Maccabi Haifa	36	15	10	11	66	47	+19	55		0–1	3–0	1–3	4–1	—	1–1
6	Hapoel Petah Tikva	36	9	13	14	48	57	−9	40		2–4	0–0	2–2	0–1	1–2	—

Source: Soccerway
Rules for classification: 1) Points; 2) Points in regular season; 3) Head-to-head points in regular season; 4) Head-to-head goal difference in regular season; 5) Head-to-head goals scored in regular season; 6) Head-to-head away goals scored in regular season (if two teams tied); 7) Goal difference; 8) Goals scored; 9) Fair play ranking; 10) Drawing of lots.

==== Championship round matches ====
19 April 2026 27	Beitar Jerusalem	3–0	Maccabi Haifa	Jerusalem
20:00	Shua 19' (pen.); Carabalí 71'; Enow (yellow card) 84'; Micha 90+3'	Report	(yellow card) 18' Seck	Stadium: Teddy Stadium; Attendance: 26,670; Referee: Aviv Klein

25 April 2026 28	Maccabi Haifa	1–3	Maccabi Tel Aviv	Haifa
20:30	Stewart (red card) 59'; Melamed 77'; Nevot Ratner (yellow card) 89'	Report	14' Varela; (yellow card) 32' Revivo; (yellow card) 43' Asante; (yellow card) 45+3', (yellow card) 46' Abu Farchi; (yellow card) 62' Sahiti; 83' (pen.) Shahar	Stadium: Sammy Ofer Stadium; Attendance: 24,131; Referee: Aviad Shiloach

29 April 2026 29	Hapoel Tel Aviv	4–0	Maccabi Haifa	Tel Aviv
19:30	Boateng (yellow card) 3'; Loizou 40', 74'; Altman 67', 70'	Report	(yellow card) 52' Benson	Stadium: Bloomfield Stadium; Attendance: 22,199; Referee: Yoav Mizrahi

2 May 2026 30	Hapoel Petah Tikva	1-2	Maccabi Haifa	Petah Tikva
20:15	Roee David 31'; N.Cohen (yellow card) 44', (red card) 81'; Altman (yellow card) 68'	Report	(yellow card) 57' Zasano; 64' Saief; (yellow card) 74' Eissat; (penalty missed) 90+6, 90+6' Haziza	Stadium: HaMoshava Stadium; Attendance: 6,108; Referee: Dekel Zino

6 May 2026 31	Maccabi Haifa	0-1	Hapoel Be'er Sheva	Haifa
20:00	Grimberg (yellow card) 51'; Azoulay (yellow card) 71'	Report	(yellow card) 45+2' Ventura; 90+1' East; (yellow card) 90+7' Peretz	Stadium: Sammy Ofer Stadium; Attendance: 17,432; Referee: Idan Leiba

9 May 2026 32	Maccabi Haifa	3-0	Beitar Jerusalem	Haifa
20:30	Agba (yellow card) 7'; Ratner 15'; Fainegezict (yellow card) 18'; Kangani 59'; Stewart 88'	Report	(yellow card) 22' Morozov; (yellow card) 74' Atzili; (yellow card) 85' Dahan	Stadium: Sammy Ofer; Attendance: 18,129; Referee: David Foxman

13 May 2026 33	Maccabi Tel Aviv	3-0	Maccabi Haifa	Tel Aviv
20:30	Yehezkel 14'; Peretz 14'; Shahar 14'; Camara (yellow card) 49'; Revivo (yellow card) 49'	Report	(yellow card) 38' Azoulay; (yellow card) 45' Goldberg	Stadium: Bloomfield Stadium; Attendance: 21,354; Referee: Gal Levi

16 May 2026 34	Maccabi Haifa	1-1	Hapoel Petah Tikva	Haifa
18:00	Melamed 18' (pen.); Bataille (yellow card) 90+3'	Report	(yellow card) 34' N.Cohen; 83' (pen.) Y.Cohen	Stadium: Sammy Ofer; Attendance: 15,238; Referee: Ohad Asulin

19 May 2026 35	Maccabi Haifa	4-1	Hapoel Tel Aviv	Haifa
20:30	Fainegezict (yellow card) 29'; Stewart 40'; Eissat (yellow card) 45+1'; Melamed 51'; Azoulay (yellow card) 64', (goal) 72'; Gabay 84'	Report	24', (yellow card) 81' Silva; (yellow card) 43' Archel	Stadium: Sammy Ofer Stadium; Attendance: 15,640; Referee: Yoni Klez

23 May 2026 36	Hapoel Be'er Sheva	2-5	Maccabi Haifa	Be'er Sheva
21:00	Hazut 43' (pen.); Kna'an 63'	Report	24', 45+5' Azoulay; 48', 59', 80' Melamed	Stadium: Turner Stadium; Referee: Sapir Berman

=== Overall ===
==== Results overview ====
Win Draw Loss

Opposition	Regular season		Championship round	
Opposition	Home score	Away score	Home score	Away score
Beitar Jerusalem	1–2	0–0	3–0	0–3
Bnei Sakhnin	4–0	3–3	—N/a	
F.C. Ashdod	5–1	4–0	—N/a	
Hapoel Be'er Sheva	0–1	0–0	0–1	5–2
Hapoel Haifa	2–0	1–1	—N/a	
Hapoel Jerusalem	2–2	1–1	—N/a	
Hapoel Petah Tikva	0–1	0–0	1–1	2–1
Hapoel Tel Aviv	2–1	0–2	4–1	0–4
Ironi Kiryat Shmona	4–1	1–0	—N/a	
Ironi Tiberias	3–2	1–1	—N/a	
Maccabi Bnei Reineh	4–0	4–0	—N/a	
Maccabi Netanya	2–3	1–4	—N/a	
Maccabi Tel Aviv	4–1	1–1	1–3	0–3

==== Results summary ====
Overall								Home						Away					
Pld	W	D	L	GF	GA	GD	Pts	W	D	L	GF	GA	GD	W	D	L	GF	GA	GD
36	15	10	11	66	47	+19	55	10	2	6	42	21	+21	5	8	5	24	26	−2

Last updated: 23 May 2026.
Source: Competitive matches

==== Results by round ====
Round	1	2	3	4	5	6	7	8	9	10	11	12	13	14	15	16	17	18	19	20	21	22	23	24	25	26	27	28	29	30	31	32	33	34	35	36
Ground	H	A	H	A	H	A	H	A	H	A	A	H	A	A	H	A	H	A	H	A	H	A	H	H	A	H	A	H	A	A	H	H	A	H	H	A
Result	W	D	W	D	L	D	L	D	D	D	D	W	W	W	L	W	W	D	W	L	W	D	W	L	L	W	L	L	L	W	L	W	L	D	W	W
Position	1	2	3	4	5	5	8	9	8	8	7	7	6	4	6	4	4	4	4	5	5	5	5	5	5	5	5	5	5	5	5	5	5	5	5	5

Source: Competitive Matches
A = Away; H = Home; W = Win; D = Draw; L = Loss

== State Cup ==
=== Round of 32 ===
27 December 2025 Round of 32	Maccabi Akhi Nazareth	1–8	Maccabi Haifa	Ilut
15:00	Moasi 79'	Report	1' Silva; 6', 17' Haziza; 24', 31' Melamed; 25' (o.g.) Odeh; 53' Gorré; 73' (o.g.) Hojerat	Stadium: Ilut Stadium; Attendance: 2,500; Referee: Gal Levi

=== Round of 16 ===
14 January 2026 Round of 16	Hapoel Ra'anana	0–1	Maccabi Haifa	Ramat Gan
20:00	Lin (yellow card) 13'; Agbaria (yellow card) 19'; Belander (yellow card) 51'	Report	(yellow card) 14' Agba; (yellow card) 69' Cornud; 90+1' Melamed	Stadium: Ramat Gan Stadium; Attendance: 7,200; Referee: Dekel Zino

=== Quarter-finals ===
3 February 2026 Quarter-finals	Maccabi Haifa	2–0	F.C. Kafr Qasim	Haifa
20:00	Ohana 22'; Cornud (yellow card) 56'; Abdoulaye Seck (yellow card) 56'; Don 90+4'	Report	(yellow card) 45+1' Atuahene; (yellow card) 70' Amer; (yellow card) 85' Sarsur; (yellow card) 85' Taha	Stadium: Sammy Ofer Stadium; Attendance: 12,143; Referee: Yoni Klez

=== Semi-finals ===
15 April 2026 Semi-finals	Maccabi Tel Aviv	3–2	Maccabi Haifa	Jerusalem 5,000 (Note: due to the 2026 Iran war the Home Front Command and the Israel Football Association was limited the number of attendance to 5,000)
19:45	Peretz 14'; Noy (yellow card) 30'; Shahar (yellow card) 36', (penalty missed) 66; Asante 58'; Revivo 76'	Report	17' Ethan Azoulay; 90+6' Silva; (yellow card) 90+6' Seck	Stadium: Teddy Stadium; Referee: Sapir Berman
Note: originally scheduled for 18 March 2026 due to the 2026 Iran war was postponed indefinitely.

== Toto Cup ==
19 July 2025 European Route	Maccabi Haifa	0–2	Beitar Jerusalem	Haifa
20:30		Report	51' Atzili; 90+10' Kangani	Stadium: Sammy Ofer Stadium; Attendance: 20,301; Referee: Gal Leibovich

17 August 2025 7–8th classification	Maccabi Haifa	0–2	Maccabi Bnei Reineh	Haifa
19:45	Mohamed (yellow card) 22'; Kasa (yellow card) 41'; Amir (yellow card) 85'	Report	(yellow card) 34' Pejić; 43', 90+3' Shaker; (yellow card) 61' Stevanović; (yellow card) 83' Hutba; (yellow card) 89' Amos	Stadium: Sammy Ofer Stadium; Attendance: 4,862; Referee: Nael Odeh

== UEFA Europa Conference League ==
=== Second qualifying round ===
24 July 2025 Second qualifying round – 1st leg	Torpedo Zhodino-BelAZ (Belarus)	1–1	(Israel) Maccabi Haifa	Szombathely, Hungary (Note: Due to the country's involvement in the Russian invasion of Ukraine, Belarusian teams were required to play their home matches at neutral venues and behind closed doors until further notice.)
20:00 (21:00 IDT)	Klimovich (yellow card) 44'; Premudrov 48'	Report	45+1' Seck; (yellow card) 73' Stewart	Stadium: Haladás Sportkomplexum; Attendance: 0 Referee: Alan Kijas (Austria)

31 July 2025 Second qualifying round – 2nd leg	Maccabi Haifa (Israel)	3–0 (4–1 agg.)	(Belarus) Torpedo Zhodino-BelAZ	Kisvárda, Hungary (Note: Due to the Gaza war, Israeli teams were required to play their home matches at neutral venues until further notice.)
20:00 (21:00 IDT)	Saba 13'; Haziza 23'; Cornud (yellow card) 66'; Stewart 79'; Khalaily (yellow card) 85'	Report	(yellow card) 30' Glushchenkov; (yellow card) 70' Alfred; (yellow card) 71' Sedko	Stadium: Várkerti Stadion; Attendance: 244; Referee: Sam Barrott (England)

=== Third qualifying round ===
7 August 2025 Third qualifying round – 1st leg	Raków Częstochowa (Poland)	0–1	(Israel) Maccabi Haifa	Raków, Częstochowa
21:00 (22:00 IDT)		Report	(yellow card) 38' Eissat; (yellow card) 45', (goal) 61' Azoulay; (yellow card) 59' Cornud; (yellow card) 63' Seck; (yellow card) 85' Melamed; (yellow card) 90' Kasa	Stadium: Miejski Stadion; Referee: Rob Harvey (Republic of Ireland)

14 August 2025 Third qualifying round – 2nd leg	Maccabi Haifa (Israel)	0–2 (1–2 agg.)	(Poland) Raków Częstochowa	Debrecen, Hungary
20:00 (21:00 IDT)	Eissat (yellow card) 31' (yellow-red card) 55'; Haziza (yellow card) 41'; Azoulay (yellow card) 90+1'; Goldberg (yellow card) 90+10'	Report	45+1' Baráth; 76' (pen.) Diaby-Fadiga	Stadium: Nagyerdei Stadion; Referee: Jérôme Brisard (France)

== Statistics ==
=== Squad statistics ===
				Ligat HaAl		State Cup		Toto Cup		UCEL		Total	
Nation	No.	Pos.	Name	App.	Goals.	App.	Goals.	App.	Goals.	App.	Goals.	App.	Goals.
(Israel)	2	RB	Zohar Zasano	10	0	1	0	0	0	0	0	11	0
(Israel)	3	CB	Sean Goldberg	24	0	2	0	1	0	2	0	28	0
(Niger)	4	DM	Ali Mohamed	20	0	1	0	1	0	4	0	26	0
(Israel)	7	RW	Silva Kangani	30	3	3	2	0	0	0	0	33	5
(Israel)	8	LW	Dolev Haziza	29	6	3	2	1	0	3	1	36	9
(Jamaica)	9	CF	Trivante Stewart	29	11	3	0	0	0	4	1	36	12
(Curaçao)	11	LW	Kenji Gorré	25	4	3	1	0	0	1	0	29	5
(Angola)	14	RW	Manuel Benson	10	1	2	0	0	0	0	0	12	1
(Israel)	15	DM	Lior Kasa	1	0	0	0	2	0	2	0	5	0
(United States)	16	LM	Kenny Saief	27	5	3	0	2	0	3	0	35	5
(Israel)	17	RW	Suf Podgoreanu	12	0	0	0	2	0	1	0	15	0
(Israel)	18	CF	Guy Melamed	23	15	4	3	1	0	2	0	30	18
(Israel)	19	DM	Ethan Azoulay	28	5	2	1	1	0	4	1	36	8
(Romania)	24	CB	Lisav Eissat	26	1	3	0	2	0	4	0	35	1
(Belgium)	25	RB	Jelle Bataille	33	0	3	1	0	0	4	0	41	0
(Israel)	26	AM	Michael Ohana	16	2	2	1	2	0	1	0	21	3
(France)	27	LB	Pierre Cornud	16	0	3	0	1	0	4	0	24	0
(Israel)	28	AM	Daniel Darzi	4	0	2	0	0	0	0	0	6	0
(Israel)	29	LB	Yinon Fainegezict	23	0	3	0	0	0	0	0	26	0
(Senegal)	30	CB	Abdoulaye Seck	26	2	2	0	1	0	4	1	33	3
(Israel)	32	DM	Itay Solomon	1	0	0	0	0	0	0	0	1	0
(Israel)	33	CF	Liam Luski	3	0	0	0	0	0	0	0	3	0
(Israel)	35	CB	Noam Sztejfman	8	0	0	0	0	0	0	0	8	0
(Israel)	36	DM	Nevot Ratner	15	1	3	0	0	0	0	0	18	1
(Israel)	37	CB	Elad Amir	9	0	2	0	1	0	0	0	12	0
(Israel)	38	CF	Adam Grimberg	4	0	0	0	0	0	0	0	4	0
(Israel)	39	CF	Niv Gabay	8	2	0	0	0	0	0	0	8	2
(Israel)	40	GK	Shareef Kayouf	5	0	3	0	1	0	0	0	9	0
(Israel)	42	RB	Eylon Baruch	1	0	0	0	0	0	0	0	1	0
(Brazil)	44	CB	Pedrão	1	0	0	0	0	0	0	0	1	0
(Ivory Coast)	45	CM	Cédric Don	12	1	2	1	0	0	0	0	14	2
(Israel)	77	GK	Roee Fucs	0	0	0	0	0	0	0	0	0	0
(Nigeria)	80	DM	Peter Agba	24	1	3	0	0	0	0	0	27	1
(Ukraine)	89	GK	Heorhiy Yermakov	32	0	1	0	1	0	4	0	38	0
(Serbia)	99	CF	Đorđe Jovanović	14	3	0	0	2	0	4	0	20	3
(Israel)		GK	Glenn Alvin	0	0	0	0	0	0	0	0	0	0
(Israel)		LB	Tomi Tsitoashvili	0	0	0	0	0	0	0	0	0	0
Players who have made an appearance this season but have left the club
(Israel)	5	DM	Goni Naor	6	0	0	0	1	0	4	0	11	0
(Curaçao)	7	RW	Xander Severina	1	0	0	0	2	0	3	0	6	0
(Spain)	10	LW	Matías Nahuel	10	2	1	0	2	0	0	0	13	2
(Israel)	10	AM	Dia Saba	0	0	0	0	1	0	2	1	3	1
(Israel)	38	CF	Omer Dahan	1	0	0	0	0	0	0	0	1	0
(Israel)	31	DM	Amit Arazi	0	0	0	0	1	0	0	0	1	0
(Israel)	36	LW	Eyad Khlaily	0	0	0	0	1	0	4	0	5	0
(Israel)	42	RB	Roey Elimelech	0	0	0	0	2	0	0	0	2	0

=== Goals ===
Rank	Position	Player	Ligat HaAl	State Cup	Toto Cup	UCEL	Total
1	CF	(Israel) Guy Melamed	15	3	0	0	18
2	CF	(Jamaica) Trivante Stewart	11	0	0	1	12
3	LW	(Israel) Dolev Haziza	6	2	0	1	9
4	DM	(Israel) Ethan Azoulay	6	1	0	1	8
5	LW	(Curaçao) Kenji Gorré	4	1	0	0	5
5	LM	(United States) Kenny Saief	5	0	0	0	5
7	AM	(Israel) Silva Kangani	3	2	0	0	5
8	CF	(Serbia) Đorđe Jovanović	3	0	0	0	3
8	CM	(Israel) Michael Ohana	2	1	0	0	3
10	CB	(Senegal) Abdoulaye Seck	1	0	0	1	2
10	LW	(Spain) Matías Nahuel	2	0	0	0	2
10	CM	(Ivory Coast) Cédric Don	2	0	0	0	2
10	CF	(Israel) Niv Gabay	2	0	0	0	2
14	AM	(Israel) Dia Saba	0	0	0	1	1
14	DM	(Nigeria) Peter Agba	1	0	0	0	1
14	CB	(Romania) Lisav Eissat	1	0	0	0	1
14	RW	(Angola) Manuel Benson	1	0	0	0	1
14	DM	(Israel) Navot Ratner	1	0	0	0	1

=== Assist ===
Rank	Position	Player	Ligat HaAl	State Cup	Toto Cup	UCEL	Total
1	LW	(Curaçao) Kenji Gorré	6	2	0	1	9
2	LB	(France) Pierre Cornud	3	1	0	1	5
2	RB	(Belgium) Jelle Bataille	3	1	0	1	5
2	DM	(Israel) Ethan Azoulay	5	0	0	0	5
5	AM	(Israel) Michael Ohana	4	0	0	0	4
6	LW	(Israel) Suf Podgoreanu	2	0	0	1	3
6	RW	(Angola) Manuel Benson	2	1	0	0	3
6	CF	(Serbia) Đorđe Jovanović	1	0	0	2	3
6	RW	(Ivory Coast) Cédric Don	3	0	0	0	3
6	RW	(Israel) Silva Kangani	2	1	0	0	3
11	LW	(Israel) Dolev Haziza	2	0	0	0	2
11	CF	(Israel) Guy Melamed	2	0	0	0	2
11	DM	(Israel) Nevot Ratner	2	0	0	0	2
14	LM	(United States) Kenny Saief	1	0	0	0	1
14	RB	(Israel) Yinon Fainegezict	0	1	0	0	1
14	CB	(Romania) Lisav Eissat	1	0	0	0	1
14	CB	(Senegal) Abdoulaye Seck	0	1	0	0	1
14	CF	(Israel) Adam Grimberg	1	0	0	0	1
14	LB	(Israel) Zohar Zasno	1	0	0	0	1
14	CF	(Israel) Niv Gabay	1	0	0	0	1

=== Clean sheets ===
Rank	Pos.	No.	Name	Ligat HaAl	State Cup	Toto Cup	UCEL	Total
1	GK	89	(Ukraine) Heorhiy Yermakov	10	0	0	2	12
2	GK	40	(Israel) Shareef Kayouf	0	2	0	0	2

=== Disciplinary record for Ligat Ha'Al and State Cup ===
No.	Pos	Nat	Name	Ligat Ha'Al			State Cup			Total		
No.	Pos	Nat	Name	Booked	(yellow card) (yellow-red card)	Sent off (straight red)	Booked	(yellow card) (yellow-red card)	Sent off (straight red)	Booked	(yellow card) (yellow-red card)	Sent off (straight red)
24	CB	(Romania)	Lisav Eissat	7						7		
19	DM	(Israel)	Ethan Azoulay	7						7		
29	LB	(Israel)	Yinon Fainegezict	6 (Note: 1 as Maccabu Haifa U-19 Player)						6		
27	LB	(France)	Pierre Cornud	3	1		2			5	1	
30	CB	(Senegal)	Abdoulaye Seck	3			2			5		
8	LW	(Israel)	Dolev Haziza	5						5		
4	DM	(Niger)	Ali Mohamed	4						4		
11	LW	(Curaçao)	Kenji Gorré	4						4		
25	RB	(Belgium)	Jelle Bataille	3	1					3	1	
5	DM	(Israel)	Goni Naor	2						2		
26	AM	(Israel)	Michael Ohana	2	1					2	1	
80	DM	(Nigeria)	Peter Agba	2	1					3		
38	CF	(Israel)	Adam Grimberg	3 (Note: 2 as Maccabu Haifa U-19 Player)						3		
45	CM	(Ivory Coast)	Cédric Franck Don	2 (Note: as Hapeol Jerusalem Player)						2		
89	GK	(Ukraine)	Heorhiy Yermakov	2						2		
3	CB	(Israel)	Sean Goldberg	2						2		
22	CF	(Jamaica)	Trivante Stewart	1		2				1		2
10	LW	(Spain)	Matías Nahuel	1						1		
17	RW	(Israel)	Suf Podgoreanu	1						1		
2	RB	(Israel)	Zohar Zasano	1		1 (Note: as Beitar Jerusalem Player)				1		1
15	DM	(Israel)	Lior Kasa	1						1		
99	CF	(Serbia)	Đorđe Jovanović	1						1		
28	AM	(Israel)	Daniel Darzi	1						1		
16	LM	(United States)	Kenny Saief	1						1		
25	RB	(Belgium)	Jelle Bataille	1						1		
36	DM	(Israel)	Navot Ratner	1		1				1		1
14	RW	(Angola)	Manuel Benson	1						1		

=== Suspensions ===
Player	Date Received	Offence	Length of suspension		
(Israel) Zohar Zasano	31 August 2025	(red card) 9' vs Maccabi Haifa	1 Matches	F.C. Ashdod (H)	15 September 2025
(Israel) Michael Ohana	8 November 2025	(yellow card) 63' (yellow-red card) 90+3' vs Bnei Sakhnin (A)	1 Matches	Hapoel Petah Tikva (A)	29 November 2025
(Jamaica) Trivante Stewart	8 November 2025	(red card) 31' vs Hapoel Petah Tikva (A)	1 Matches	Hapoel Tel Aviv (H)	2 December 2025
(Belgium) Jelle Bataille	14 December 2025	(yellow card) 20' (yellow-red card) 73' vs Maccabi Bnei Reineh (A)	1 Matches	Beitar Jerusalem (H)	22 December 2025
(Romania) Lisav Eissat	24 January 2026	(yellow card) 66' vs Maccabi Netanya (A)	1 Matches	Ironi Tiberias (H)	31 January 2026
(France) Pierre Cornud	24 January 2026	(yellow card) 39' (yellow-red card) 77' vs Maccabi Netanya (A)	1 Matches	Ironi Tiberias (H)	31 January 2026
(France) Pierre Cornud	3 February 2026	(yellow card) 56' vs F.C. Kafr Qasim (H)	1 Matches	Hapoel Jerusalem (A)	7 February 2026
(Israel) Dolev Haziza	7 April 2026	(yellow card) 41' vs Hapoel Tel Aviv (A)	1 Matches	Ironi Kiryat Shmona (A)	12 April 2026
(Israel) Navot Ratner	7 April 2026	(red card) 46' vs Hapoel Tel Aviv (A)	1 Matches	Ironi Kiryat Shmona (A)	12 April 2026
(Senegal) Abdoulaye Seck	19 April 2026	(yellow card) 18' vs Beitar Jerusalem (A)	1 Matches	Maccabi Tel Aviv (H)	25 April 2026
(Jamaica) Trivante Stewart	25 April 2026	(red card) 59' vs Maccabi Tel Aviv (H)	2 Matches	Hapoel Tel Aviv (A); Hapoel Petah Tikva (A)	29 April 2026; 2 May 2026
(Senegal) Abdoulaye Seck	29 April 2026	Discipline vs Maccabi Tel Aviv (H)	1 Matches	Hapoel Petah Tikva (A)	2 May 2026
(Israel) Ethan Azoulay	6 May 2026	(yellow card) 71' vs Hapoel Be'er Sheva (H)	1 Matches	Beitar Jerusalem (H)	9 May 2026
(Israel) Yinon Fainegezict	10 May 2026	(yellow card) 17' vs Beitar Jerusalem (H)	1 Matches	Maccabi Tel Aviv (A)	13 May 2026

=== Penalties ===
Date	Penalty Taker	Scored	Opponent	Competition
23 August 2025	(Israel) Dolev Haziza	Yes	Maccabi Bnei Reineh	Ligat Ha`Al
15 September 2025	(Spain) Matías Nahuel	Yes	F.C. Ashdod	Ligat Ha`Al
15 September 2025	(Israel) Dolev Haziza	Yes	F.C. Ashdod	Ligat Ha`Al
15 September 2025	(Serbia) Đorđe Jovanović	Yes	F.C. Ashdod	Ligat Ha`Al
6 October 2025	(Serbia) Đorđe Jovanović	Yes	Maccabi Tel Aviv	Ligat Ha`Al
18 October 2025	(Israel) Dolev Haziza	Yes	Maccabi Netanya	Ligat Ha`Al
18 October 2025	(Serbia) Đorđe Jovanović	No	Maccabi Netanya	Ligat Ha`Al
1 November 2025	(Jamaica) Trivante Stewart	Yes	Hapoel Jerusalem	Ligat Ha`Al
8 November 2025	(Jamaica) Trivante Stewart	Yes	Bnei Sakhnin	Ligat Ha`Al
8 November 2025	(Jamaica) Trivante Stewart	Yes	Bnei Sakhnin	Ligat Ha`Al
2 December 2025	(Israel) Dolev Haziza	Yes	Hapoel Tel Aviv	Ligat Ha`Al
14 December 2025	(Israel) Ethan Azoulay	Yes	Maccabi Bnei Reineh	Ligat Ha`Al
2 May 2026	(Israel) Dolev Haziza	No	Hapoel Petah Tikva	Ligat Ha`Al
16 May 2026	(Israel) Guy Melamed	Yes	Hapoel Petah Tikva	Ligat Ha`Al

=== Overall ===
	Total	Home	Away	Natural
Games played	46	23	22	1
Games won	20	12	8	—
Games drawn	11	2	9	—
Games lost	14	9	5	1
Biggest win	8–1 vs Maccabi Akhi Nazareth	4–0 vs Maccabi Bnei Reineh; 5–1 vs F.C. Ashdod; 4–0 vs Bnei Sakhnin	8–1 vs Maccabi Akhi Nazareth	—
Biggest loss	0–4 vs Hapoel Tel Aviv	0–2 vs Beitar Jerusalem vs 0–2 Raków Częstochowa; 0–2 vs Maccabi Bnei Reineh; 1–3 Maccabi Tel Aviv	0–4 vs Hapoel Tel Aviv	2–3 Maccabi Tel Aviv
Biggest win (League)	4–0 vs Maccabi Bnei Reineh (twice); 5–1 vs F.C. Ashdod; 4–0 vs F.C. Ashdod; 4–0 vs Bnei Sakhnin	4–0 vs Maccabi Bnei Reineh; 5–1 vs F.C. Ashdod; 4–0 vs Bnei Sakhnin	4–0 vs Maccabi Bnei Reineh; 4–0 vs F.C. Ashdod	—
Biggest loss (League)	0–4 vs Hapoel Tel Aviv	1–3 Maccabi Tel Aviv	0–4 vs Hapoel Tel Aviv	—
Biggest win (Cup)	8–1 vs Maccabi Akhi Nazareth		8–1 vs Maccabi Akhi Nazareth	—
Biggest loss (Cup)				2–3 Maccabi Tel Aviv
Biggest win (Toto)	—	—	—	—
Biggest loss (Toto)	0–2 vs Beitar Jerusalem; 0–2 vs Maccabi Bnei Reineh	0–2 vs Beitar Jerusalem; 0–2 vs Maccabi Bnei Reineh	—	—
Biggest win (Europe)	3–0 vs FC Torpedo-BelAZ Zhodino	3–0 vs FC Torpedo-BelAZ Zhodino	1–0 vs Raków Częstochowa	—
Biggest loss (Europe)	0–2 vs Raków Częstochowa	0–2 vs Raków Częstochowa	—	—
Goals scored	84	47	35	2
Goals conceded	58	26	29	3
Goal difference	+26	+21	+6	–1
Average GF per game	1.83	1.91	1.59	2
Average GA per game	1.26	1.17	1.27	3
Clean sheets	13	5	8	—
Yellow cards	83	38	45	—
Red cards	7	2	5	—
Most appearances	(Belgium) Jelle Bataille (41)			
Most goals	(Israel) Guy Melamed (18)			
Most Assist	(Curaçao) Kenji Gorré (9)			
Penalties for	14	9	5	—
Penalties scored	12	8	4	—
Penalties against	10	4	5	1
Penalties saved	1	0	0	1
