= 2025–26 Toto Cup Al =

Tournament details
- Country: Israel
- Dates: 13 July 2025 - 28 October 2025
- Teams: 14

Final positions
- Champions: Beitar Jerusalem (4th title)
- Runners-up: Hapoel Tel Aviv
- Semifinalists: Hapoel Be'er Sheva; Hapoel Haifa

Tournament statistics
- Matches played: 30
- Goals scored: 86 (2.87 per match)
- Top goal scorer(s): Asil Kna'ani; Mohammed Shaker; Stav Turiel (4)
- All statistics correct as of 23 July 2025.

The 2025–26 Toto Cup Al is the 41st season of the football tournament in Israel since its introduction and the 19th tournament involving Israeli Premier League clubs only.

Maccabi Tel Aviv are the defending champions

== Format ==
The four clubs playing in the UEFA competitions (Maccabi Tel Aviv, Maccabi Haifa, Hapoel Be'er Sheva and Beitar Jerusalem) will not take part in the group stage, while the remaining ten clubs were divided into two groups of five, at the end of the group stage each of the group winners will qualify to the semi-finals. Maccabi Tel Aviv and Hapoel Be'er Sheva played in the 2025 Israel Super Cup match for a place in one of the semi-finals (meeting the group winner with the least points accumulated), while Maccabi Haifa and Beitar Jerusalem played for a place in the other semi-final (meeting the group winner with the most points accumulated). All clubs will participate in classification play-offs to determine their final positions.

== Group stage ==
Groups were allocated according to geographic distribution of the clubs, with the northern clubs allocated to Group A, and the southern clubs allocated to Group B. Each club will play the other clubs once.

The matches will start on 22 July 2025.

=== Group A ===
Pos	Team	Pld	W	D	L	GF	GA	GD	Pts	Qualification	HHA	MBR	IKS	ITI	BnS
1	Hapoel Haifa	4	3	0	1	6	4	+2	9	Semi-finals			0–1		1–0
2	Maccabi Bnei Reineh	4	2	0	2	9	9	0	6	5–8th classification play-offs	3–4				4–2
3	Ironi Kiryat Shmona	4	2	0	2	4	4	0	6	9–10th classification play-offs		1–2		2–1	
4	Ironi Tiberias	4	1	1	2	4	4	0	4	11–12th classification play-offs	0–1	2–0			
5	Bnei Sakhnin	4	1	1	2	4	6	−2	4	13–14th classification play-offs			1–0	1–1	

Source: soccerway
Legend: Blue = home team win; Yellow = draw; Red = away team win.
Rules for classification: 1) points; 2) goal difference; 3) number of wins; 4) goals scored; 5) head to head; 6) higher position in the last season.

=== Group B ===
Pos	Team	Pld	W	D	L	GF	GA	GD	Pts	Qualification	HTA	HJE	MNE	HPT	ASH
1	Hapoel Tel Aviv	4	3	0	1	7	4	+3	9	Semi-finals		3–0			2–0
2	Hapoel Jerusalem	4	3	0	1	7	4	+3	9	5–8th classification play-offs			4–0	1–0	
3	Maccabi Netanya	4	2	1	1	7	7	0	7	9–10th classification play-offs	3–0				1–1
4	Hapoel Petah Tikva	4	1	0	3	6	6	0	3	11–12th classification play-offs	1–2		2–3		
5	F.C. Ashdod	4	0	1	3	2	8	−6	1	13–14th classification play-offs		1–2		0–3	

Source: soccerway
Legend: Blue = home team win; Yellow = draw; Red = away team win.
Rules for classification: 1) points; 2) goal difference; 3) number of wins; 4) goals scored; 5) head to head; 6) higher position in last season.

== European qualification route ==
=== Israel Super Cup ===
13 July 2025
19:30

Maccabi Tel Aviv	1–2	Hapoel Be'er Sheva
Patati 62'	Report	13' Peretz; 77' Almog

Bloomfield Stadium, Tel Aviv
Attendance: 25,066
Referee: Gal Levi

=== UEFA qualifiers match ===
19 July 2025
20:30

Maccabi Haifa	0–2	Beitar Jerusalem
	Report	51' Atzili; 90+10' Kangani

Sammy Ofer Stadium, Haifa
Attendance: 20,301
Referee: Gal Leibovich

== Classification play-offs ==
=== 13–14th classification match ===
16 August 2025 13–14 place	F.C. Ashdod	2–2 (4–5 p)	Bnei Sakhnin	Ashdod
20:30	Ansah 48'; Korsia 51' (o.g.)		89' Bushanek; 90+4' Salman	Stadium: Yud-Alef Stadium; Referee: Dekel Zino
	Penalties
	Nahmani (penalty scored); Tamam (penalty scored); Nangis (penalty scored); Diakité (penalty missed); Hadadi (penalty scored); Kimvuidi (penalty missed); Gethon (penalty missed)		(penalty scored) Mido; (penalty missed) Bushanek; (penalty scored) Korsia; (penalty scored) Khoury; (penalty scored) Salman; (penalty missed) Abu Nil; (penalty scored) Abu Hussin

=== 11–12th classification match ===
16 August 2025 11–12 place	Hapoel Petah Tikva	3–2	Ironi Tiberias	Petah Tikva
20:30	Beni 21'; Dgani 33'; Gissin 84'		11' Gotlieb; 49' Bilenkyi	Stadium: HaMoshava Stadium; Referee: Yoav Mizrahi

=== 9–10th classification match ===
16 August 2025 9–10 place	Maccabi Netanya	1–0	Ironi Kiryat Shmona	Netanya
20:30	Tavares 80'			Stadium: Netanya Stadium; Referee: Yoni Klez

=== 7–8th classification match ===
17 August 2025 7–8 place	Maccabi Haifa	0–2	Maccabi Bnei Reineh	Haifa
19:45			43', 90+3' Shaker	Stadium: Sammy Ofer Stadium; Attendance: 4,862; Referee: Nael Odeh

=== 5–6th classification match ===
17 August 2025 5–6 place	Maccabi Tel Aviv	2–1	Hapoel Jerusalem	Tel Aviv
20:00	Abu Farchi 12'; Turgeman 59'		87' (pen.) Badash	Stadium: Bloomfield Stadium; Attendance: 7,402; Referee: Aviv Klain

== Semi-finals ==
16 August 2025 Semi-final	Hapoel Be'er Sheva	0–2	Hapoel Tel Aviv	Be'er Sheva
20:30			38' Rotman; 67' Lemkin	Stadium: Turner Stadium; Referee: Ohad Asulin

18 August 2025 Semi-final	Beitar Jerusalem	5–0	Hapoel Haifa	Jerusalem
20:00	Kalu 28'; Atzili 30'; Levi 48'; Hugi 65'; Ben Shimol 73' (pen.)			Stadium: Teddy Stadium; Referee: Idan Leiba

== Final ==
28 October 2025 Final	Hapoel Tel Aviv	1–2	Beitar Jerusalem	Haifa
20:30	Morgan (yellow card) 3'; Turiel (yellow card) 58', (goal) 90+10'		34' Micha; 62' Kalu	Stadium: Sammy Ofer Stadium; Attendance: 24,560; Referee: Aviad Shiloach

== Final rankings ==
R	Team
1st place, gold medalist(s)	Beitar Jerusalem
2nd place, silver medalist(s)	Hapoel Tel Aviv
3rd place, bronze medalist(s)	Hapoel Be'er Sheva
3rd place, bronze medalist(s)	Hapoel Haifa
5	Maccabi Tel Aviv
6	Hapoel Jerusalem
7	Maccabi Bnei Reineh
8	Maccabi Haifa
9	Maccabi Netanya
10	Ironi Kiryat Shmona
11	Hapoel Petah Tikva
12	Ironi Tiberias
13	Bnei Sakhnin
14	F.C. Ashdod
