= 2025–26 Israeli Premier League =

Israeli Premier League
- Season: 2025–2026
- Dates: 23 August 2025 – 23 May 2026
- Champions: Hapoel Be'er Sheva
- Relegated: F.C. Ashdod; Maccabi Bnei Reineh
- UEFA Champions League: Hapoel Be'er Sheva
- UEFA Europa League (via State Cup): Maccabi Tel Aviv
- UEFA Conference League: Beitar Jerusalem; Hapoel Tel Aviv
- Matches: 240
- Goals: 709 (2.95 per match)
- Top goalscorer: Dor Peretz (19 goals)
- Biggest home win: Hapoel Be'er Sheva 7–0 Ironi Tiberias (30 August 2025)
- Biggest away win: Maccabi Netanya 2–8 Beitar Jerusalem (23 February 2026)
- Highest scoring: Maccabi Netanya 2–8 Beitar Jerusalem (23 February 2026)
- Longest winning run: Hapoel Be'er Sheva; Beitar Jerusalem (6)
- Longest unbeaten run: Beitar Jerusalem (12)
- Longest winless run: F.C. Ashdod (12)
- Longest losing run: Maccabi Bnei Reineh (9)
- Highest attendance: 29,395 (Maccabi Haifa vs Beitar Jerusalem, 22 December 2025)
- Average attendance: 9,676
- All statistics correct as of 23 May 2026.

The 2025–26 Israeli Premier League, also known as Ligat TOTO Winner for sponsorship reasons, is the 27th season since the introduction of the Israeli Premier League in 1999 and the 84th season of top-tier football in Israel. Due to the risk of missile strikes stemming from the 2026 Iran war, the league was suspended between 28 February and 4 April 2026.

== Teams ==
The league consists of fourteen teams; twelve sides from the previous season and two promoted teams from the 2024–25 Liga Leumit Hapoel Petah Tikva and Hapoel Tel Aviv. Both teams returned to the top flight after a single season. They replaced the 2024–25 Israeli Premier League bottom two teams, Hapoel Hadera and Maccabi Petah Tikva who were relegated to the 2025–26 Liga Leumit.

Locations of the 2025–26 Israeli Premier League teams

=== Stadiums and locations ===
Team	Location	Stadium	Capacity
Beitar Jerusalem	Jerusalem	Teddy Stadium	31,733
Bnei Sakhnin	Sakhnin	Doha Stadium	8,500
F.C. Ashdod	Ashdod	Yud-Alef Stadium	7,800
Hapoel Be'er Sheva	Be'er Sheva	Turner Stadium	16,126
Hapoel Haifa	Haifa	Sammy Ofer Stadium	30,950
Hapoel Jerusalem	Jerusalem	Teddy Stadium	31,733
Hapoel Petah Tikva	Petah Tikva	HaMoshava Stadium	11,500
Hapoel Tel Aviv	Tel Aviv	Bloomfield Stadium	29,400
Ironi Kiryat Shmona	Kiryat Shmona	Netanya Stadium	13,610
Ironi Tiberias	Tiberias	Green Stadium (Note: The team play their home games at a neutral venue because their own ground does not meet league requirements.)	5,200
Maccabi Bnei Reineh	Reineh	Green Stadium	5,200
Maccabi Haifa	Haifa	Sammy Ofer Stadium	30,950
Maccabi Netanya	Netanya	Netanya Stadium	13,610
Maccabi Tel Aviv	Tel Aviv	Bloomfield Stadium	29,400

Beitar Jerusalem Hapoel Jerusalem	Hapoel Haifa Maccabi Haifa	Hapoel Tel Aviv Maccabi Tel Aviv
Teddy Stadium, Jerusalem	Sammy Ofer Stadium, Haifa	Bloomfield Stadium, Tel Aviv
Maccabi Netanya Ironi Kiryat Shmona	Hapoel Petah Tikva	Bnei Sakhnin
Netanya Stadium, Netanya	HaMoshava Stadium, Petah Tikva	Doha Stadium, Sakhnin
F.C. Ashdod	Hapoel Be'er Sheva	Ironi Tiberias Maccabi Bnei Reineh
Yud-Alef Stadium, Ashdod	Turner Stadium, Be'er Sheva	Green Stadium, Nof HaGalil

=== Personnel and sponsorship ===
Team	President	Manager	Captain	Kitmaker	Shirt sponsor
Beitar Jerusalem	(Israel) Barak Abramov	(Israel) Barak Yitzhaki	(Israel) Yarden Shua	Umbro	Geshem Holdings
Bnei Sakhnin	(Israel) Mohammed Abu Younes	(Israel) Yossi Abukasis	(Israel) Maroun Gantous	Diadora	White-Sakhnin Dairies
F.C. Ashdod	(Israel) Rafi Niddam	(Israel) Sharon Mimer	(Israel) Tom Ben Zaken	Umbro	
Hapoel Be'er Sheva	(Israel) Alona Barkat	(Israel) Ran Kojok	(Israel) Miguel Vítor	Umbro	Victory
Hapoel Haifa	(Israel) Yoav Katz	(Israel) Haim Silvas	(Israel) Dor Malul	Reebok	Panorama North
Hapoel Jerusalem	(Israel) Yotam Karmon	(Israel) Lior Zada	(Israel) Awaka Ashta	Legea	Allon Ventures
Hapoel Petah Tikva	(Israel) Almog Portman	(Israel) Omer Peretz	(Israel) Omer Katz	Lotto	Mivne Group
Hapoel Tel Aviv	(Brazil) Edmond M. Safra	(Israel) Elyaniv Barda	(Republic of the Congo) Fernand Mayembo	Nike	IBI Investment
Ironi Kiryat Shmona	(Israel) Izzy Sheratzky	(Israel) Shay Barda	(Israel) Ariel Sheratzky	Le Coq Sportif	Ituran
Ironi Tiberias	(Israel) Arie Kalmanzon and Mickey Bitan	(Israel) Eliran Hudeda	(Israel) Guy Hadida	Le Coq Sportif	Yochelman Group
Maccabi Bnei Reineh	(Israel) Saeed Basoul	(Israel) Lior Reuven	(Israel) Eyad Hutba	Zeus Sport	
Maccabi Haifa	(Israel) Ya'akov Shahar	(Israel) Barak Bakhar	(Israel) Dolev Haziza	Adidas	Volvo
Maccabi Netanya	(United States) Ross Kestin	(Israel) Ronny Levy	(Israel) Karem Jaber	Lotto	Sea Breeze
Maccabi Tel Aviv	(Canada) Mitchell Goldhar	(Scotland) Kenny Miller	(Israel) Dor Peretz	Puma	Pelephone

==== Managerial changes ====
Team	Outgoing manager	Manner of departure	Date of vacancy	Position in table	Incoming manager	Date of appointment	Ref.
Maccabi Bnei Reineh	(Israel) Sharon Mimer	End of contract	28 May 2025	Pre-season	(Israel) Slobodan Drapić	28 May 2025	
Maccabi Haifa	(Israel) Itay Mordechai	End of caretaking spell	4 June 2025	Pre-season	(Argentina) Diego Flores	4 June 2025	
Hapoel Haifa	(Israel) Ronny Levy	End of contract	6 June 2025	Pre-season	(Israel) Gal Arel	6 June 2025	
Bnei Sakhnin	(Israel) Meni Koretski	Sacked	15 June 2025	Pre-season	(Israel) Sharon Mimer	15 June 2025	
Maccabi Bnei Reineh	(Israel) Slobodan Drapić	Sacked	13 October 2025	13th	(Israel) Adham Hadiya	25 October 2025	
Maccabi Haifa	(Argentina) Diego Flores	Sacked	20 October 2025	8th	(Israel) Barak Bakhar	21 October 2025	
Maccabi Netanya	(Israel) Yossi Abukasis	Sacked	11 January 2026	7th	(Israel) Ronny Levy	14 January 2026	
F.C. Ashdod	(Israel) Haim Silvas	Sacked	12 January 2026	11th	(Israel) Nir Bitton (caretaker)	12 January 2026	
Maccabi Tel Aviv	(Serbia) Žarko Lazetić	Sacked	27 January 2026	3rd	(Norway) Ronny Deila	31 January 2026	
Bnei Sakhnin	(Israel) Sharon Mimer	Resigned	13 February 2026	8th	(Israel) Ayman Abu Younes (caretaker)	13 February 2026	
Maccabi Bnei Reineh	(Israel) Adham Hadiya	Sacked	14 February 2026	14th	(Israel) Lior Reuven	16 February 2026	
Bnei Sakhnin	(Israel) Ayman Abu Younes (caretaker)	End of caretaking spell	17 February 2026	8th	(Israel) Yossi Abukasis	17 February 2026	
Hapoel Jerusalem	(Israel) Ziv Arie	Resigned	20 April 2026	12th	(Israel) Lior Zada	20 April 2026	
F.C. Ashdod	(Israel) Nir Bitton (caretaker)	Resigned	26 April 2026	11th	(Israel) Sharon Mimer	26 April 2026	
Maccabi Tel Aviv	(Norway) Ronny Deila	Resigned	4 May 2026	3rd	(Scotland) Kenny Miller	4 May 2026	

== Foreign players ==
The number of foreign players were restricted to eight per team.
In bold: Players that have been capped for their national team.

Club	Player 1	Player 2	Player 3	Player 4	Player 5	Player 6	Player 7	Player 8	Non-visa player
Beitar Jerusalem	(Colombia) Brayan Carabalí	(Cameroon) **Boris Enow**	(Georgia (country)) Luka Gadrani	(Colombia) Jasond González	(Nigeria) Johnbosco Kalu	(Portugal) Miguel Silva	(Cape Verde) **Aílson Tavares**	(Ghana) Nana Antwi	(Russia) Grigori Morozov
Bnei Sakhnin	(Republic of the Congo) **Durel Avounou**	(Croatia) Karlo Bručić	(Ghana) Mathew Cudjoe	(Senegal) **Ibrahima Dramé**	(Armenia) **Artur Miranyan**	(Madagascar) **Johan Nzi**	(Brazil) Maicom David	(Nigeria) James Adeniyi	
F.C. Ashdod	(Ghana) **Eugene Ansah**	(Uganda) **Timothy Awany**	(Ghana) Hayford Boahen	(Ivory Coast) Ibrahim Diakité	(Democratic Republic of the Congo) **Karim Kimvuidi**	(Poland) Karol Niemczycki	(Senegal) **Arial Mendy**	(Nigeria) Victor Ochayi	
Hapoel Be'er Sheva	(Senegal) **Djibril Diop**	(Zambia) **Kings Kangwa**	(Portugal) Hélder Lopes	(Brazil) Lucas Ventura	(Serbia) Igor Zlatanović	(Jamaica) **Javon East**			(Bulgaria) **Yoni Stoyanov**
Hapoel Haifa	(Georgia (country)) **Sandro Altunashvili**	(Guinea-Bissau) **Saná Gomes**	(Serbia) Ivan Kričak	(Burkina Faso) **Régis N'do**	(Brazil) Bruno Ramires	(Croatia) Dario Župarić	(Montenegro) **Andrija Radulović**		(Sweden) Benjamin Machini
Hapoel Jerusalem	(Kosovo) **David Domgjoni**	(Nigeria) Andrew Idoko	(Nigeria) John Otomewo	(Montenegro) **Marko Rakonjac**	(Cyprus) **Ruel Sotiriou**				(Nigeria) Ibeh Ransom
Hapoel Petah Tikva	(Ivory Coast) Boni Amian	(Cape Verde) **Clé**	(Mali) Mamady Diarra	(Hungary) Márk Koszta	(Zambia) **Chipyoka Songa**	(Gabon) **Alex Moucketou-Moussounda**			
Hapoel Tel Aviv	(Ghana) Emmanuel Boateng	(Brazil) Chico	(Guadeloupe) **Marcus Coco**	(Brazil) Falcão	(Bulgaria) **Andrian Kraev**	(Cyprus) **Loizos Loizou**	(Republic of the Congo) **Fernand Mayembo**	(Portugal) Xande Silva	
Ironi Kiryat Shmona	(Ghana) Yaw Ackah	(Nigeria) Wale Musa Alli	(Serbia) Nemanja Ljubisavljević	(Panama) **Cristian Martínez**	(Peru) Adrián Ugarriza	(Peru) Fernando Pacheco			(Brazil) Daniel Tenenbaum
Ironi Tiberias	(Czech Republic) Ondřej Bačo	(Ukraine) Stanislav Bilenkyi	(Nigeria) Peter Michael	(Portugal) Rogério	(Guinea-Bissau) **Sambinha**	(Nigeria) Muhammed Usman			(Ukraine) Daniel Joulani
Maccabi Bnei Reineh	(Zambia) **Emmanuel Banda**	(Moldova) **Vitalie Damașcan**	(Nigeria) Junior Pius	(Romania) **Antonio Sefer**	(Serbia) Miladin Stevanović	(Guinea-Bissau) **Zé Turbo**	(Ivory Coast) Christ Tiéhi	(France) Virgile Pinson	
Maccabi Haifa	(Nigeria) Peter Agba	(Belgium) Jelle Bataille	(Angola) **Manuel Benson**	(Ivory Coast) Cédric Franck Don	(Serbia) Đorđe Jovanović	(Brazil) Pedrão	(Senegal) **Abdoulaye Seck**	(Jamaica) **Trivante Stewart**	(France) Pierre Cornud (Curaçao) **Kenji Gorré** (Niger) **Ali Mohamed** (Ukraine) Heorhiy Yermakov (United States) Kenny Saief (Romania) **Lisav Eissat**
Maccabi Netanya	(Brazil) Matheus Davó	(Ivory Coast) Gontie Junior Diomandé	(Georgia (country)) **Saba Khvadagiani**	(Ivory Coast) Aziz Mohammed	(Cape Verde) **Heriberto Tavares**	(Mali) Bakary Konaté	(France) Wylan Cyprien	(Brazil) Pedrinho	(United States) Wilson Harris
Maccabi Tel Aviv (Note: Ion Nicolaescu as Suspended registration)	(Venezuela) Kervin Andrade	(Netherlands) Tyrese Asante	(Serbia) **Kristijan Belić**	(Guinea) **Mohamed Ali Camara**	(Brazil) Heitor	(Kosovo) Emir Sahiti	(Mali) Issouf Sissokho	(Cape Verde) **Hélio Varela**	(Poland) Ben Lederman

== Regular season ==
=== Regular season table ===
Pos	Team	Pld	W	D	L	GF	GA	GD	Pts	Qualification
1	Hapoel Be'er Sheva	26	18	5	3	58	25	+33	59	Qualification for the Championship round
2	Beitar Jerusalem	26	17	6	3	61	29	+32	57	Qualification for the Championship round
3	Maccabi Tel Aviv	26	14	7	5	55	32	+23	49	Qualification for the Championship round
4	Hapoel Tel Aviv	26	15	6	5	46	26	+20	49 (Note: Hapoel Tel Aviv had 2 points deducted following riot in Maccabi Tel Aviv match.)	Qualification for the Championship round
5	Maccabi Haifa	26	11	9	6	50	28	+22	42	Qualification for the Championship round
6	Hapoel Petah Tikva	26	9	10	7	41	36	+5	37	Qualification for the Championship round
7	Maccabi Netanya	26	10	5	11	45	55	−10	35	Qualification for the Relegation round
8	Bnei Sakhnin	26	8	8	10	27	35	−8	32	Qualification for the Relegation round
9	Ironi Kiryat Shmona	26	7	6	13	37	46	−9	27	Qualification for the Relegation round
10	Hapoel Haifa	26	6	7	13	31	44	−13	25	Qualification for the Relegation round
11	F.C. Ashdod	26	5	9	12	32	50	−18	24	Qualification for the Relegation round
12	Hapoel Jerusalem	26	4	9	13	22	37	−15	21	Qualification for the Relegation round
13	Ironi Tiberias	26	7	6	13	32	52	−20	19 (Note: Ironi Tiberias had 8 points deducted)	Qualification for the Relegation round
14	Maccabi Bnei Reineh	26	3	3	20	17	59	−42	12	Qualification for the Relegation round

Source: Soccerway
Rules for classification: 1) Points; 2) Goal difference; 3) Matches won; 4) Goals scored; 5) Head-to-head points; 6) Head-to-head goal difference; 7) Head-to-head goals scored; 8) Play-off.

=== Regular season results ===
Home \ Away	HBS	BEI	MTA	HTA	MHA	HPT	MNE	BnS	IKS	HHA	ASH	HJE	ITI	MBR
Hapoel Be'er Sheva	—	2–1	1–0	2–1	0–0	1–1	2–0	3–1	3–2	1–1	2–2	4–1	7–0	1–0
Beitar Jerusalem	0–1	—	0–0	1–0	0–0	5–2	4–2	2–1	2–1	2–2	0–0	1–1	3–2	1–0
Maccabi Tel Aviv	1–3	2–6	—	1–2	1–1	2–2	4–0	1–0	3–1	2–1	3–2	2–1	1–1	4–0
Hapoel Tel Aviv	2–1	3–2	0–3	—	2–0	4–0	2–0	2–0	2–1	1–0	1–0	3–1	2–0	3–1
Maccabi Haifa	0–1	1–2	4–1	2–1	—	0–1	2–3	4–0	4–1	2–0	5–1	2–2	3–2	4–0
Hapoel Petah Tikva	1–1	1–3	0–4	0–0	0–0	—	3–1	2–2	4–1	0–1	2–0	0–0	0–2	4–1
Maccabi Netanya	2–4	2–8	1–1	2–0	4–1	0–2	—	1–2	1–1	0–0	2–2	1–1	5–2	2–1
Bnei Sakhnin	0–5	1–2	0–0	0–0	3–3	1–2	2–1	—	1–1	0–2	3–0	0–0	2–0	2–0
Ironi Kiryat Shmona	1–0	1–2	1–4	2–2	0–1	0–0	1–2	2–0	—	3–1	1–2	1–2	2–2	3–1
Hapoel Haifa	3–4	2–3	1–4	3–3	1–1	2–2	3–4	0–2	0–0	—	0–2	2–1	2–0	0–1
F.C. Ashdod	1–2	1–1	2–2	2–6	0–4	1–1	2–3	1–2	2–5	4–1	—	0–2	1–1	2–0
Hapoel Jerusalem	1–5	0–2	1–3	0–0	1–1	2–1	1–2	0–0	0–1	0–1	1–2	—	2–0	1–2
Ironi Tiberias	3–0	0–5	1–4	0–2	1–1	1–4	4–0	1–1	2–3	1–0	0–0	1–0	—	2–1
Maccabi Bnei Reineh	0–2	1–3	0–2	2–2	0–4	1–6	0–4	0–1	3–1	1–2	0–0	0–0	1–3	—

Source: "Ligat Ha'Al – Matches".
Legend: Blue = home team win; Yellow = draw; Red = away team win.

== Championship round ==
Key numbers for pairing determination (number marks position after 26 games)

Rounds
27th	28th	29th	30th	31st	32nd	33rd	34th	35th	36th
1 – 6; 2 – 5; 3 – 4	1 – 2; 5 – 3; 6 – 4	2 – 6; 3 – 1; 4 – 5	1 – 4; 2 – 3; 6 – 5	3 – 6; 4 – 2; 5 – 1	6 – 1; 5 – 2; 4 – 3	2 – 1; 3 – 5; 4 – 6	3 – 2; 4 – 1; 5 – 6	6 – 2; 1 – 3; 5 – 4	6 – 3; 2 – 4; 1 – 5

=== Championship round table ===
Pos	Team	Pld	W	D	L	GF	GA	GD	Pts	Qualification	HBS	BEI	MTA	HTA	MHA	HPT
1	Hapoel Be'er Sheva (C)	36	24	7	5	79	38	+41	79	Qualification for the Champions League second qualifying round	—	2–2	4–2	2–0	2–5	3–0
2	Beitar Jerusalem	36	22	10	4	78	40	+38	76	Qualification for the Conference League second qualifying round	1–1	—	4–2	1–1	3–0	3–1
3	Maccabi Tel Aviv	36	19	9	8	72	46	+26	66	Qualification for the Europa League second qualifying round (Note: The 2025–26 Israel State Cup winners (Maccabi Tel Aviv) qualify for the Europa League second qualifying round.)	1–0	1–2	—	1–0	3–0	4–0
4	Hapoel Tel Aviv	36	18	8	10	55	35	+20	60 (Note: Hapoel Tel Aviv had 2 points deducted following riot in Maccabi Tel Aviv match.)	Qualification for the Conference League second qualifying round	0–2	0–1	1–1	—	4–0	1–0
5	Maccabi Haifa	36	15	10	11	66	47	+19	55		0–1	3–0	1–3	4–1	—	1–1
6	Hapoel Petah Tikva	36	9	13	14	48	57	−9	40		2–4	0–0	2–2	0–1	1–2	—

Source: Soccerway
Legend: Blue = home team win; Yellow = draw; Red = away team win.
Rules for classification: 1) Points; 2) Points in regular season; 3) Head-to-head points in regular season; 4) Head-to-head goal difference in regular season; 5) Head-to-head goals scored in regular season; 6) Head-to-head away goals scored in regular season (if two teams tied); 7) Goal difference; 8) Goals scored; 9) Fair play ranking; 10) Drawing of lots.
(C) Champions

== Relegation round ==
Key numbers for pairing determination (number marks position after 26 games)

Rounds
27th	28th	29th	30th	31st	32nd	33rd
7 – 11; 8 – 13; 9 – 12; 10 – 14	11 – 14; 12 – 10; 13 – 9; 7 – 8	8 – 11; 9 – 7; 10 – 13; 14 – 12	11 – 13; 7 – 12; 8 – 14; 9 – 10	10 – 11; 14 – 9; 12 – 8; 13 – 7	11 – 12; 13 – 14; 7 – 10; 8 – 9	9 – 11; 10 – 8; 14 – 7; 12 – 13

=== Relegation round table ===
Pos	Team	Pld	W	D	L	GF	GA	GD	Pts	Qualification or relegation	MNE	IKS	ITI	HHA	BnS	HJE	ASH	MBR
7	Maccabi Netanya	33	14	6	13	59	63	−4	48					1–1	3–0	1–0	2–1	
8	Hapoel Ironi Kiryat Shmona	33	11	7	15	50	53	−3	40		1–0			2–0		3–1	2–3	
9	Ironi Tiberias	33	12	8	13	45	56	−11	36 (Note: Ironi Tiberias had 8 points deducted)		4–3	2–0						1–0
10	Hapoel Haifa	33	8	10	15	39	51	−12	34				1–1		3–0		1–0	2–3
11	Bnei Sakhnin	33	8	10	15	28	49	−21	34			0–4	0–0				1–1	0–2
12	Hapoel Jerusalem	33	7	10	16	26	43	−17	31				0–2	0–0	1–0			
13	F.C. Ashdod (R)	33	6	10	17	38	62	−24	28	Relegation to Liga Leumit			0–3			0–1		1–2
14	Maccabi Bnei Reineh (R)	33	6	4	23	26	69	−43	22	Relegation to Liga Leumit	1–4	1–1				0–1		

Source: Soccerway
Legend: Blue = home team win; Yellow = draw; Red = away team win.
Rules for classification: 1) Points; 2) Points in regular season; 3) Head-to-head points in regular season; 4) Head-to-head goal difference in regular season; 5) Head-to-head goals scored in regular season; 6) Head-to-head away goals scored in regular season (if two teams tied); 7) Goal difference; 8) Goals scored; 9) Fair play ranking; 10) Drawing of lots.
(R) Relegated

== Season statistics ==
=== Top scorers ===
As of 24 May 2026

Rank	Player	Club	Goals
1	(Israel) Dor Peretz	Maccabi Tel Aviv	19
2	(Peru) Adrián Ugarriza	Ironi Kiryat Shmona	18
3	(Israel) Dan Biton	Hapoel Be'er Sheva	15
3	(Israel) Yarden Shua	Beitar Jerusalem	15
3	(Israel) Omer Atzili	Beitar Jerusalem	15
3	(Israel) Guy Melamed	Maccabi Haifa	15
7	(Serbia) Igor Zlatanović	Hapoel Be'er Sheva	14
8	(Israel) Ido Shahar	Maccabi Tel Aviv	13
8	(Jamaica) Javon East	Hapoel Haifa / Hapoel Be'er Sheva	13
10	(Israel) Stav Turiel	Hapoel Tel Aviv	12
10	(Israel) Guy Hadida	Ironi Tiberias	12
10	(Zambia) Kings Kangwa	Hapoel Be'er Sheva	12

== Attendances ==
Israeli Premier League clubs listed by average home league attendance:

Pos	Club	Average attendance
1	Beitar Jerusalem	23,397
2	Maccabi Haifa	22,603
3	Maccabi Tel Aviv	20,168
4	Hapoel Tel Aviv	17,974
5	Hapoel Be'er Sheva	13,347
6	Maccabi Netanya	6,092
7	Hapoel Jerusalem	5,899
8	Hapoel Petah Tikva	5,687
9	Hapoel Haifa	4,075
10	FC Ashdod	2,633
11	Ironi Kiryat Shmona	2,528
12	Bnei Sakhnin	1,825
13	Ironi Tiberias	1,773
14	Maccabi Bnei Reineh	1,698

== See also ==
- 2025–26 Liga Leumit
- 2025–26 Liga Alef
- 2025–26 Israel State Cup
