= 2026 Israel Super Cup =

Football match in Haifa, Israel

2025 Israel Super Cup
Hapoel Be'er Sheva	Maccabi Tel Aviv
1	3
- Date: 16 July 2026
- Venue: Turner Stadium, Be'er Sheva
- Referee: Aviv Klein

The 2026 Israel Super Cup was the 31st edition of the Israel Super Cup (36th, including unofficial matches (Note: The competition wasn't played within the Israel Football Association for its first 6 editions, until 1969.)), an annual Israeli football match played between the winners of the previous season's Israeli Premier League (Hapoel Be'er Sheva) and the Israel State Cup (Maccabi Tel Aviv). This was the tenth edition since the Super cup's resumption in 2015.

== Match details ==
16 July 2026
19:30

Hapoel Be'er Sheva	1–3	Maccabi Tel Aviv
Kangwa 14'		10', 73' Abu Farchi; 58' Peretz

Turner Stadium, Be'er Sheva
Referee: Aviv Klein
