= Ziv Ben Shimol =

Israeli footballer

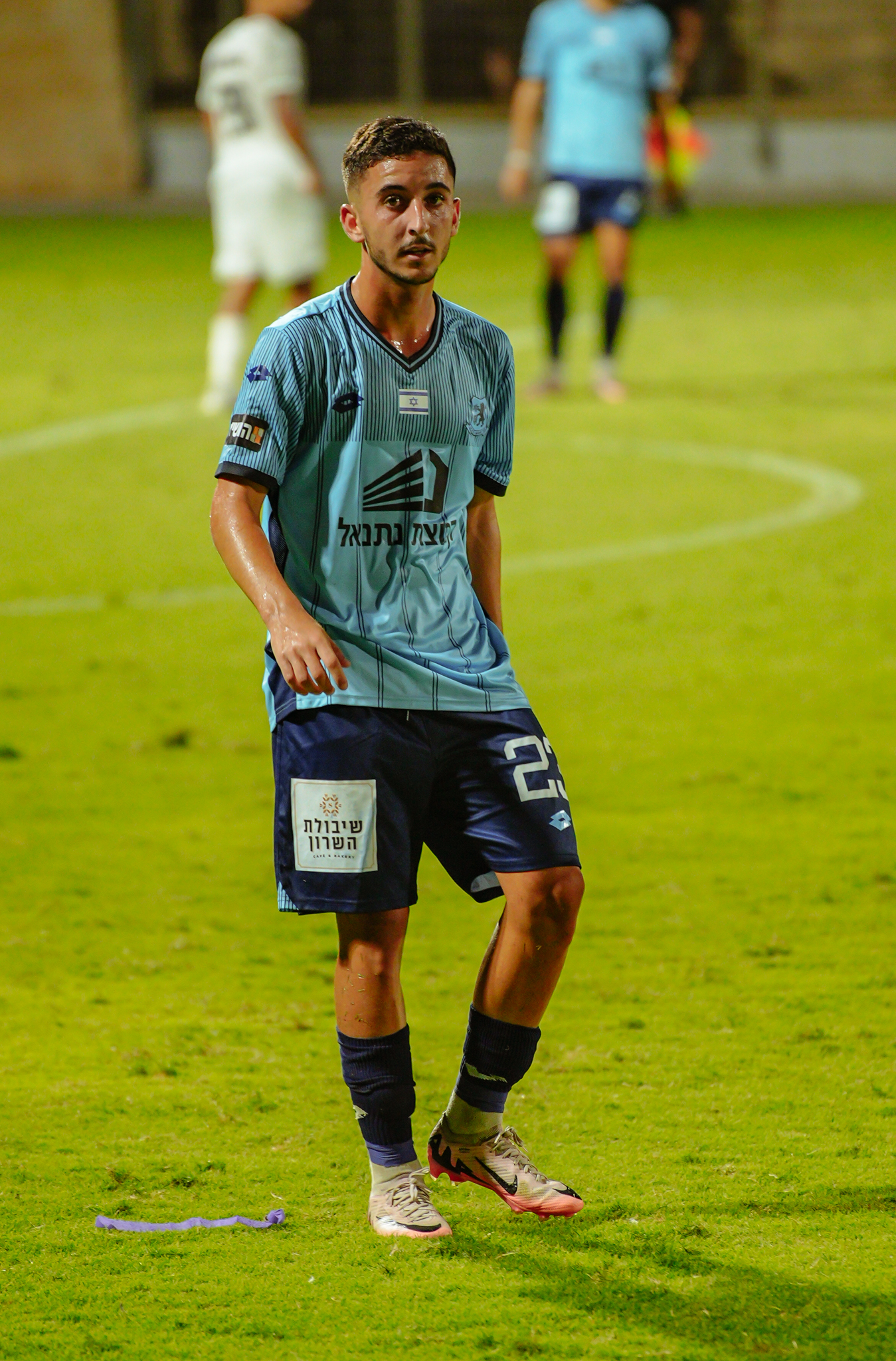
- Ziv Ben Shimol in 2024.

Personal information
- Full name: Ziv Israel Ben Shimol
- Date of birth: 27 January 2004 (age 22)
- Place of birth: Ma'ale Adumim, Israel
- Height: 1.72 m (5 ft 7 1/2 in)
- Position: Midfielder

Team information
- Current team: Beitar Jerusalem
- Number: 6

Youth career
- 2012–2020: Beitar Ironi Ma'ale Adumim
- 2020–2023: Maccabi Haifa

Senior career*
Years	Team	Apps	(Gls)
2023–2025	Maccabi Haifa	3	(0)
2023–2024	→ Hapoel Afula (loan)	18	(2)
2024–2025	→ Bnei Yehuda (loan)	33	(5)
2025–	Beitar Jerusalem	31	(3)

International career
2023	Israel U19	5	(0)
- * Club domestic league appearances and goals as of 23 June 2026

Ziv Ben Shimol (Hebrew: זיו בן שימול; born 27 January 2004) is an Israeli professional footballer who plays as a midfielder for Israeli club Beitar Jerusalem and the Israel national under-19 team.

== Club career ==
Ben Shimol signed to the children's' team of Beitar Ma'ale Adumim when he was eight years old. In 2018, he scored 62 goals. In 2020 signed for Maccabi Haifa.

In summer 2023, he was loaned to the Liga Leumit club Hapoel Afula. In January 2024 returned to Maccabi Haifa.

== International career ==
He is a youth International for Israel, who plays for the under-19 national team since 2023.

== Career statistics ==
=== Club ===
As of 1 June 2025.

Club	Season	League			State Cup		Toto Cup		Continental		Other		Total	
Club	Season	Division	Apps	Goals	Apps	Goals	Apps	Goals	Apps	Goals	Apps	Goals	Apps	Goals
Hapoel Afula	2023–24	Liga Leumit	18	2	0	0	4	1	–		0	0	22	3
Hapoel Afula	Total		18	2	0	0	4	1	0	0	0	0	22	3
Maccabi Haifa	2023–24	Israeli Premier League	3	0	1	0	0	0	–		0	0	4	0
Maccabi Haifa	Total		3	0	1	0	0	0	0	0	0	0	4	0
Bnei Yehuda	2024–25	Liga Leumit	33	5	1	0	2	1	–		0	0	36	6
Bnei Yehuda	Total		33	5	1	0	2	1	0	0	0	0	36	6
Beitar Jerusalem	2025–26	Israeli Premier League	31	3	2	0	2	1	–		0	0	35	4
Beitar Jerusalem	Total		31	3	2	0	2	1	0	0	0	0	35	4
Career total			85	10	4	0	8	3	0	0	0	0	97	8

== See also ==
- List of Jewish footballers
- List of Jews in sports
- List of Israelis
