= Lior Kasa =

Israeli footballer

Personal information
- Full name: Lior Kasa
- Date of birth: 27 September 2005 (age 21)
- Place of birth: Jerusalem, Israel
- Height: 1.85 m (6 ft 1 in)
- Position: Midfielder

Team information
- Current team: Maccabi Petah Tikva

Youth career
- 2016–2020: Hapoel Katamon
- 2020–2024: Hapoel Jerusalem

Senior career*
Years	Team	Apps	(Gls)
2023–2024	Hapoel Jerusalem	13	(0)
2024–	Maccabi Haifa	8	(0)
2024–2025	→ Genoa (loan)	8	(0)
2026–	→ Maccabi Petah Tikva (loan)	0	(0)

International career^{‡}
2021	Israel U17	1	(0)
2022	Israel U18	3	(1)
2023–2024	Israel U19	7	(0)
2024–	Israel U21	5	(0)
- * Club domestic league appearances and goals as of 23 June 2026 ‡ National team caps and goals as of 5 June 2025

Lior Kasa (Hebrew: ליאור קאסה; born 27 September 2005) is an Israeli professional footballer who plays as a midfielder for Israeli Premier League club Maccabi Petah Tikva, on loan from Maccabi Haifa, and the Israel national under-21 team.

== Early life ==
Kasa was born in Jerusalem, Israel, to an Ethiopian-Jewish family.

== Club career ==
Kasa made his senior debut for Hapoel Jerusalem on 7 May 2023, as a substitute in the 66th minute in an Israeli Premier League away match against Maccabi Netanya, that ended in a 1–4 loss.

On 23 January 2024 he signed for 4.5 years at Israeli Premier League club Maccabi Haifa. Few hours later made his debut in the Toto Cup final (of Ligat HaAl) against Maccabi Tel Aviv.

On 25 August 2024 he was loaned for Italian Serie A club Genoa, for a season with option for purchase.

8 September 2026 he was loaned to Israeli Premier League club Maccabi Petah Tikva for a season.

== International career ==
He has been a youth International for Israel, who played for the under-17, for the under-18, and for the under-19 national teams.

He is currently a youth International for Israel who plays for the under-21 national team since 2024.

== Career statistics ==
=== Club ===
As of match played 24 May 2025

Club	Season	League			State Cup		Toto Cup		Continental		Other		Total	
Club	Season	Division	Apps	Goals	Apps	Goals	Apps	Goals	Apps	Goals	Apps	Goals	Apps	Goals
Hapoel Jerusalem	2022–23	Israeli Premier League	2	0	0	0	1	0	–		0	0	3	0
Hapoel Jerusalem	2023–24	Israeli Premier League	11	0	0	0	0	0	–		0	0	11	0
Hapoel Jerusalem	Total		13	0	0	0	1	0	0	0	0	0	14	0
Maccabi Haifa	2023–24	Israeli Premier League	7	0	3	0	1	0	–		0	0	11	0
Genoa	2024–25	Serie A	8	0	0	0	–		—		—		8	0
Career total			28	0	3	0	2	0	0	0	0	0	33	0

== See also ==
- List of Jewish footballers
- List of Jews in sports
- List of Israelis
