= Chipyoka Songa =

Zambian association football player

Personal information
- Date of birth: 24 September 2004 (age 22)
- Place of birth: Lusaka, Zambia
- Height: 1.77 m (5 ft 10 in)
- Position: Winger

Team information
- Current team: Moreirense
- Number: 28

Senior career*
Years	Team	Apps	(Gls)
2020–2022	Lusaka Dynamos		
2022–2025	ZESCO United		
2023–2024	→ Ness Ziona	30	(8)
2024–2025	→ Hapoel Petah Tikva (loan)	33	(7)
2025–2026	Hapoel Petah Tikva	23	(6)
2026–	Moreirense	0	(0)

International career^{‡}
2024–	Zambia	2	(0)
- * Club domestic league appearances and goals as of 9 September 2026 ‡ National team caps and goals as of 29 March 2025

Chipyoka Songa (born 24 September 2004) is a Zambian professional footballer who plays as a winger for Primeira Liga club Moreirense and the Zambia national team.

== Career ==
Songa was a youth product of Lusaka Dynamos and was promoted to the first team in 2020, and after two seasons moved to ZESCO United.

On 15 September 2023 signed for the Liga Leumit club Ness Ziona. On 21 September 2023 made his debut in the 1–0 win against Hapoel Acre. One week later scored twice in the 2–5 loss against Hapoel Ramat HaSharon.

On 28 July 2024 signed for Hapoel Petah Tikva.

On 4 September 2026, Songa signed with Moreirense in Portugal.

== International ==
On 11 September 2024, he made his debut with Zambia national team in a 0–0 draw against Chad.
