= Lior Zada =

Israeli footballer

Lior Zada ליאור זאדה
Personal information
- Full name: Lior Zada
- Date of birth: 26 December 1978 (age 47)
- Place of birth: Jerusalem, Israel
- Position: Midfielder

Youth career
- Hapoel Jerusalem

Senior career*
Years	Team	Apps	(Gls)
1998–2000	Hapoel Mevaseret Zion		

Managerial career
- 2008: Hapoel Jerusalem (youth)
- 2008–2009: Hapoel Bik'at HaYarden
- 2009–2012: Hapoel Katamon
- 2012–2013: Maccabi Jaffa
- 2013–2015: Maccabi Kiryat Gat
- 2015–2016: Hapoel Ramat HaSharon
- 2016–2017: Hapoel Ramat Gan
- 2017–2019: Hapoel Katamon
- 2019: Maccabi Ahi Nazareth
- 2020: Nordia Jerusalem
- 2020: Sektzia Ness Ziona
- 2020–2021: Hapoel Ramat HaSharon
- 2021: Hapoel Ramat Gan
- 2022–2025: Hapoel Jerusalem (assistant manager)
- 2022–2026: Hapoel Jerusalem (youth)
- 2026–: Hapoel Jerusalem
- * Club domestic league appearances and goals

Lior Zada (Hebrew: ליאור זאדה; born 26 December 1978), is an Israeli football coach who using as an assistant manager at Hapoel Jerusalem and the youth team's head coach.

== Career ==
On 13 June 2022 he was appointed Hapoel Jerusalem's assistant manager and also the manager of the youth team.
