= Adham Hadiya =

Israeli footballer

Personal information
- Full name: Adham Hadiya
- Date of birth: 12 February 1985 (age 41)
- Place of birth: Nazareth, Israel
- Position: Midfielder

Team information
- Current team: Maccabi Bnei Reineh (manager)

Youth career
- Maccabi Akhi Nazareth

Senior career*
Years	Team	Apps	(Gls)
2002–2004	Maccabi Akhi Nazareth	?	(?)
2004–2006	Macacbi Petah Tikva	14	(1)
2006–2007	Hakoah Ramat Gan	1	(0)
2007–2012	Maccabi Akhi Nazareth	113	(4)
2012–2013	Hapoel Kfar Saba	10	(0)
2013–2016	Maccabi Akhi Nazareth	76	(1)

International career
2004	Israel U21	1	(0)

Managerial career
- 2016–2017: Maccabi Akhi Nazareth (assistant)
- 2017–2018: Maccabi Akhi Nazareth
- 2018: Shimshon Kafr Qasim
- 2018–2019: Hapoel Iksal
- 2019–2020: Hapoel Kaukab
- 2020: Maccabi Akhi Nazareth
- 2021–2022: Maccabi Bnei Reineh
- 2023: Hapoel Umm al-Fahm
- 2023–2025: F.C. Kafr Qasim
- 2025–2026: Maccabi Bnei Reineh
- 2026–: Hapoel Acre
- * Club domestic league appearances and goals

Adham Hadiya (Arabic: أدهم هدية, Hebrew: אדהם האדיה; born 12 February 1985) is an Israeli former footballer who is currently the manager of Hapoel Acre.

== Honours ==
- Liga Leumit
  - Winner (1): 2021-22
