= Gad Amos =

Israeli footballer

Personal information
- Date of birth: 24 December 1988 (age 37)
- Place of birth: Tiberias, Israel
- Height: 1.86 m (6 ft 1 in)
- Position: Goalkeeper

Team information
- Current team: Hapoel Tel Aviv
- Number: 33

Youth career
- Maccabi Haifa

Senior career*
Years	Team	Apps	(Gls)
2008–2012	Maccabi Haifa	0	(0)
2009–2010	→ Hapoel Acre	0	(0)
2010–2011	→ Hapoel Haifa	6	(0)
2011–2012	→ Maccabi Akhi Nazareth	21	(0)
2012–2013	Hapoel Haifa	1	(0)
2013–2014	Maccabi Akhi Nazareth	27	(0)
2014–2015	Ironi Nesher	31	(0)
2015–2018	Maccabi Akhi Nazareth	100	(0)
2018–2020	Ironi Kiryat Shmona	8	(0)
2020–2021	Maccabi Akhi Nazareth	35	(0)
2021–2023	Bnei Sakhnin	51	(0)
2023–2026	Maccabi Bnei Reineh	67	(0)
2026–	Hapoel Tel Aviv	1	(0)
- * Club domestic league appearances and goals as of 23 June 2026

Gad Amos (Hebrew: גד עמוס; born 24 December 1988) is an Israeli professional footballer who plays as a goalkeeper for Hapoel Tel Aviv.

Amos started to play football for Maccabi Haifa's youth team.

On 23 May 2023, he signed for Maccabi Bnei Reineh In June 2023 called up at the first time to the Israel national football team's squad after Daniel Peretz injured before the game against Andorra, Since he called-up twice more, but he has not yet played for the national team.
