= Sayed Abu Farchi =

Israeli footballer (born 2006)

Personal information
- Full name: Sayed Abu Farchi
- Date of birth: 11 May 2006 (age 20)
- Place of birth: Baqa al-Gharbiyye, Israel
- Height: 1.84 m (6 ft 1/2 in)
- Position: Centre forward

Team information
- Current team: Colorado Rapids
- Number: 9

Youth career
- 2014–2016: Maccabi Barkai
- 2016–2024: Maccabi Tel Aviv

Senior career*
Years	Team	Apps	(Gls)
2024–2026	Maccabi Tel Aviv	33	(8)
2024	→ Kafr Qasim (loan)	13	(4)
2024–2025	→ Maccabi Bnei Reineh (loan)	32	(4)
2026–	Colorado Rapids	1	(0)

International career^{‡}
2022	Israel U16	1	(0)
2022–2023	Israel U17	10	(2)
2023–2025	Israel U19	17	(4)
2024–2026	Israel U21	8	(0)
2026–	Israel	2	(1)
- * Club domestic league appearances and goals as of 23 June 2026 ‡ National team caps and goals as of 20:00, 24 September 2026 (UTC)

Sayed Abu Farchi (Hebrew: סייד אבו פרחי, Arabic: سيد أبو فرحي; born 11 May 2006) is an Israeli professional footballer who plays as a forward for Major League Soccer club Colorado Rapids and the Israel national team.

== Early life ==
Abu Farchi was born on 11 May 2006 in Baqa al-Gharbiyye, Israel, to an Arab-Muslim family.

== Club career ==
Abu Farchi made his senior debut for Maccabi Tel Aviv on 31 August 2023, as a substitute in the 90th minute in a 2023–24 UEFA Europa Conference League qualifying away match against the Slovenian club Celje, that ended in a 2–2 draw.

In February 2024 loaned to Liga Leumit club F.C. Kafr Qasim.

On 1 September 2026, Abu Farchi was sold to MLS side Colorado Rapids for a reported fee of $6 million. He signed a contract through the 2029–30 MLS season with an option for 2030–31.

== International career ==
=== Youth career ===
He was a youth International for Israel, who played for the under-19 national team from 2023 to 2025, and has played for the under-21 national team from 2024.

=== Senior career ===
During his second cap for the senior Israel national team against Austria in the 2026–27 UEFA Nations League B on 24 September 2026, he was sent off after receiving a second yellow card for celebrating his goal by performing a gesture with the corner flag. This celebration garnered attention due to confusion over whether it simulated a snooker shot or a rifle. Israel national team head coach Ran Ben-Shimon clarified that Abu Farchi always celebrates his goals by imitating a snooker shot, as he had done in the 2026 Israel Super Cup. The Israel Football Association sent an official complaint to UEFA over the referee's decision to send off Abu Farchi, citing "extreme injustice". Shlomi Berl, the Israel Football Association spokesperson, said: "The association today formally filed a complaint regarding the yellow cards shown to Abu Farchi against Austria. We argue that the first yellow card was incorrect and the second resulted from a misunderstanding by the refereeing team. Everyone knows that this is his regular celebration and it mimics a snooker shot".

== Career statistics ==
=== Club ===
As of match played 20 September 2026

Club	Season	League			National cup (Note: Includes Israel State Cup, U.S. Open Cup)		League cup (Note: Includes Toto Cup)		Continental		Other		Total	
Club	Season	Division	Apps	Goals	Apps	Goals	Apps	Goals	Apps	Goals	Apps	Goals	Apps	Goals
Maccabi Tel Aviv	2023–24	Israeli Premier League	1	0	0	0	0	0	1 (Note: Appearance in UEFA Conference League)	0	–		2	0
Maccabi Tel Aviv	2024–25	Israeli Premier League	0	0	0	0	0	0	1 (Note: Appearance in UEFA Champions League)	0	1 (Note: Appearance in Israel Super Cup)	0	2	0
Maccabi Tel Aviv	2025–26	Israeli Premier League	31	7	4	2	1	1	6 (Note: Appearances in UEFA Europa League)	1	–		42	11
Maccabi Tel Aviv	2026–27	Israeli Premier League	1	1	0	0	1	0	5 (Note: Four appearances and two goals in UEFA Europa League, one appearance in UEFA Conference League)	2	1	2	8	5
Maccabi Tel Aviv	Total		33	8	4	2	2	1	13	3	2	2	54	16
Kafr Qasim (loan)	2023–24	Liga Leumit	13	4	0	0	0	0	–		–		13	4
Maccabi Bnei Reineh (loan)	2023–24	Israeli Premier League	32	4	3	1	2	1	–		–		37	6
Colorado Rapids	2026	Major League Soccer	2	0	1	0	–		–		–		3	0
Career total			80	16	8	3	4	2	13	3	2	2	107	26

=== International ===
As of match played 24 September 2026

List of international goals scored by Sayed Abu Farchi
No.	Date	Venue	Opponent	Score	Result	Competition
1.	24 September 2026	Raiffeisen Arena, Linz, Austria	Austria	1–1	1–3	2026–27 UEFA Nations League B

== Honours ==
Source: AiScore

Maccabi Tel Aviv

- Israel State Cup: 2025–26
- Israel Super Cup: 2024, 2026
- Toto Cup: 2023–24

== See also ==
- List of Israelis
