= Lisav Eissat =

Romanian footballer (born 2005)

Personal information
- Full name: Lisav Naif Eissat
- Date of birth: 13 January 2005 (age 21)
- Place of birth: Haifa, Israel
- Height: 1.87 m (6 ft 2 in)
- Positions: Centre-back; full-back

Team information
- Current team: Bristol City
- Number: 2

Youth career
- 2012–2024: Maccabi Haifa

Senior career*
Years	Team	Apps	(Gls)
2024–2026	Maccabi Haifa	26	(1)
2024–2025	→ Hapoel Hadera (loan)	26	(3)
2026–	Bristol City	13	(1)

International career^{‡}
2019–2020	Israel U15	4	(0)
2022	Israel U18	3	(0)
2023–2024	Israel U19	5	(0)
2025	Israel U21	1	(0)
2026	Romania U21	2	(0)
2025–	Romania	7	(0)
- * Club domestic league appearances and goals as of 8 November 2026 ‡ National team caps and goals as of 14 November 2026

Lisav Naif Eissat (Arabic: ليساف عيسات, Hebrew: ליסב עיסאת; born 13 January 2005) is a professional footballer who plays as a centre-back or as a full-back for EFL Championship club Bristol City. Born in Israel, he plays for the Romania national team.

== Club career ==
=== Maccabi Haifa ===
Lisav Eissat is a product of Maccabi Haifa's youth academy, where he developed through the club's junior teams and won national titles with the under-16 and under-19 squads. In 2024 he was promoted to the senior team and loaned to Hapoel Hadera, where he became a regular starter and scored three goals before returning to Maccabi Haifa.

=== Bristol City ===
On 10 July 2026, Eissat signed with Bristol City on a 4-year deal. The EFL Championship club decided to trigger the player's €2.5 million release clause.

== International career ==
On 9 October 2025, 20-year-old Eissat made his senior debut for Romania under Mircea Lucescu in the 2–1 friendly win over Moldova.

== Personal life ==
Eissat was born in Haifa, Israel, to a Muslim-Arab father and a Romanian-Jewish mother.

The decision to represent the Romanian national team was entirely his choice, inspired by his maternal great-grandmother's from Dorohoi, Romania wish when he was 15. He feels connected to Romania and has previously attracted interest from Dinamo București.

== Career statistics ==
As of 8 November 2026

Appearances and goals by club, season and competition
Club	Season	League			National cup (Note: Includes Israel State Cup)		League cup (Note: Includes Toto Cup, EFL Cup)		Europe		Other		Total	
Club	Season	Division	Apps	Goals	Apps	Goals	Apps	Goals	Apps	Goals	Apps	Goals	Apps	Goals
Maccabi Haifa	2024–25	Israeli Premier League	—		—		0	0	0	0	—		0	0
Maccabi Haifa	2025–26	Israeli Premier League	26	1	3	0	2	0	4 (Note: Appearance in UEFA Conference League)	0	—		34	1
Maccabi Haifa	Total		26	1	3	0	2	0	4	0	—		35	1
Hapoel Hadera (loan)	2024–25	Israeli Premier League	26	3	2	0	3	0	—		—		31	3
Bristol City	2026–27	Championship	13	1	0	0	1	0	—		—		14	1
Career total			65	5	5	0	5	0	4	0	—		79	5

=== International ===
As of match played 14 November 2026

Appearances and goals by national team and year
National team	Year	Apps	Goals
Romania
Romania	2025	2	0
Romania	2026	5	0
Total		7	0
