= Zohar Zasno =

Israeli footballer

Personal information
- Date of birth: 21 November 2001 (age 24)
- Place of birth: Ashdod, Israel
- Position: Right-back

Team information
- Current team: Maccabi Haifa
- Number: 22

Youth career
- F.C. Ashdod

Senior career*
Years	Team	Apps	(Gls)
2019–2024	F.C. Ashdod	111	(0)
2024–2025	Beitar Jerusalem	48	(0)
2025–	Maccabi Haifa	10	(0)

International career^{‡}
2021–	Israel U21	5	(1)
- * Club domestic league appearances and goals as of 23 June 2026 ‡ National team caps and goals as of 29 March 2022

Zohar Zasno (or Zasano, Hebrew: זוהר זסנו; born 21 November 2001) is an Israeli professional footballer who plays as a right-back for Israeli Premier League club Maccabi Haifa and the Israel national under-21 team.

== Early life ==
Zasno was born and raised in Ashdod, Israel, to an Ethiopian Jewish family.
