= Maccabi Ironi Kiryat Ata Bialik F.C. =

Israeli football club

Maccabi Ironi Kiryat Ata Bialik
- Founded: 2020; 6 years ago
- Ground: Municipal Stadium, Kiryat Ata
- Capacity: 726
- Manager: (Israel) Avi Sabag
- League: Liga Alef North
- 2024–25: Liga Alef North, 7th of 16
Home colours	Away colours

Maccabi Ironi Kiryat Ata Bialik (Hebrew: מכבי עירוני קריית אתא ביאליק) is an Israeli football club based in the Tzur Shalom neighbourhood of Kiryat Bialik. The club plays in Liga Alef North, and played home matches at the Kiryat Ata Stadium.

== History ==
The club founded on 27 July 2020 after merger between Maccabi Ironi Kiryat Ata and Maccabi Tzur Shalom. The youth teams stayed as separated teams.
