= Aílson Tavares =

Cape Verdean footballer (born 1998)

Personal information
- Full name: Aílson Júnior Mendes Tavares
- Date of birth: 20 July 1998 (age 28)
- Place of birth: Praia, Cape Verde
- Height: 1.88 m (6 ft 2 in)
- Position: Defensive midfielder

Team information
- Current team: Chaves
- Number: 42

Youth career
- 2009–2016: Fabril
- 2016–2017: Académica

Senior career*
Years	Team	Apps	(Gls)
2017–2018	Alcanenense	28	(1)
2018–2019	Benfica Castelo Branco	31	(3)
2019–2022	Torreense	49	(1)
2023	Anadia	5	(0)
2023–2024	Académica de Coimbra	27	(0)
2024–2025	Felgueiras	31	(1)
2025–2026	Beitar Jerusalem	15	(0)
2026–	Chaves	1	(0)

International career^{‡}
2017	Portugal U19	3	(0)
2019	Cape Verde U20	1	(0)
2025–	Cape Verde	3	(0)
- * Club domestic league appearances and goals as of 13 September 2026 ‡ National team caps and goals as of 8 June 2025

Aílson Júnior Mendes Tavares (Portuguese: [ɐ.ˈil.sɔn ˈʒu.ni.ɔɾ ˈmẽ.dɨʃ ta.ˈva.ɾɨʃ]; born 20 July 1998) is a Cape Verdean footballer who plays as a midfielder for Liga Portugal 2 club Chaves and the Cape Verde national team.

== Club career ==
Born in Praia the capital city of Cape Verde.

On 6 July 2025 signed for Israeli Premier League club Beitar Jerusalem for one season with option for two more seasons.

== International career ==
Tavares was born in Cape Verde, and moved to Portugal at a young age, and holds dual Cape Verdean - Portuguese citizenship. He played for the Portugal U19s in 2017. In May 2025, he was called up to the Cape Verde national team.

== Career statistics ==
=== International ===
As of match played 8 June 2025

Appearances and goals by national team and year
National team	Year	Apps	Goals
Cape Verde	2025	3	0
Total		3	0
