= Ayi Silva Kangani =

Israeli footballer

Ayi Silva Kangani Soukpe
Personal information
- Date of birth: 15 May 2003 (age 23)
- Place of birth: Tel Aviv, Israel
- Height: 1.85 m (6 ft 1 in)
- Position: Forward

Team information
- Current team: Maccabi Haifa
- Number: 26

Youth career
- 2013: Hapoel Tel Aviv
- 2013–2014: Hapoel Bat Yam
- 2014: Gadna Tel Aviv
- 2014–2017: Maccabi Tel Aviv
- 2017–2020: Bnei Yehuda

Senior career*
Years	Team	Apps	(Gls)
2020–2023	Bnei Yehuda	51	(11)
2021	→ Hakoah Amidar Ramat Gan (loan)	7	(3)
2023–2024	Austria Wien	4	(0)
2023–2024	Stripfing	16	(1)
2024–2025	Beitar Jerusalem	34	(8)
2025–	Maccabi Haifa	30	(3)
- * Club domestic league appearances and goals as of 23 June 2026

Ayi Silva Kangani Soukpe (Hebrew: איי סילבה קאנגני סוקפה; born 15 May 2003), known as Silva Kani, is an Israeli footballer who currently plays as a forward for Maccabi Haifa.

== Early life ==
Kangani was born in Israel to Richard and Chantal, migrants from Togo. He is one of five children. In 2017, his family received temporary residency status which allowed his father to register him with a football club. His father chose Bnei Yehuda over Maccabi Tel Aviv fearing that his son would not get a chance to play over more well connected families at Maccabi. Kangani attended Zalman Shazar High School in Tel Aviv.

== Club career ==
=== Early career ===
From the ages of 10 to 14, Kangani bounced around between youth clubs in Israel. Due to the lack of an Israeli identity card, Kangani could not be registered as a player with the IFA.

Kangani made his first team debut on 6 June 2020, coming on as a substitute for Matan Baltaxa in the 60th minute against Hapoel Hadera. Eleven minutes later, he scored his first league goal giving his club a four-goal lead on their way to a 5–0 victory. On 8 June 2020, Kangani signed a three-year professional contract with Bnei Yehuda.

On 30 March 2021 he was loaned to the Liga Alef side Hakoah Amidar Ramat Gan.

=== Austria Wien ===
On 28 May 2023 signed for 4.5 season for the Austrian club Austria Wien.

== Personal life ==
Kangani is scheduled to be drafted into service with the IDF. His younger brother, Richie, is also a footballer in the youth teams at Bnei Yehuda.

== Career statistics ==
=== Club ===
As of 1 June 2024.

Club	Season	League			National Cup		League Cup		Continental		Other		Total	
Club	Season	Division	Apps	Goals	Apps	Goals	Apps	Goals	Apps	Goals	Apps	Goals	Apps	Goals
Bnei Yehuda	2019–20	Israeli Premier League	6	2	1	0	0	0	–		0	0	7	2
Bnei Yehuda	2020–21	Israeli Premier League	6	0	0	0	2	0	–		0	0	8	0
Bnei Yehuda	2021–22	Liga Leumit	13	1	1	0	0	0	–		0	0	14	1
Bnei Yehuda	2022–23	Liga Leumit	26	8	0	0	4	2	–		0	0	30	10
Bnei Yehuda	Total		51	11	2	0	6	2	–		0	0	59	13
Hakoah Amidar Ramat Gan	2020–21	Liga Alef	12	3	0	0	0	0	–		0	0	12	3
Hakoah Amidar Ramat Gan	Total		12	3	0	0	0	0	–		0	0	12	3
Austria Wien	2023–24	Austrian Football Bundesliga	4	0	1	0	0	0	1	0	0	0	6	0
Austria Wien	Total		4	0	1	0	0	0	1	0	0	0	6	0
SV Stripfing	2023–24	Austrian Regionalliga	16	2	0	0	0	0	–		0	0	16	2
SV Stripfing	Total		16	2	0	0	0	0	–		0	0	16	2
Beitar Jerusalem	2024–25	Israeli Premier League	0	0	0	0	0	0	–		0	0	0	0
Beitar Jerusalem	Total		0	0	0	0	0	0	–		0	0	0	0
Career total			83	16	3	0	6	2	1	0	0	0	93	18
