= Ibrahim Diakité (footballer, born 2004) =

Ivorian footballer

Personal information
- Full name: Ibrahim Diakité
- Date of birth: 23 April 2004 (age 22)
- Place of birth: Ivory Coast
- Height: 1.85 m (6 ft 1 in)
- Position: Centre back

Team information
- Current team: Ashdod
- Number: 3

Youth career
- ASEC Mimosas

Senior career*
Years	Team	Apps	(Gls)
2023–2025	ASEC Mimosas		
2025–	Ashdod	31	(3)
- * Club domestic league appearances and goals as of 24 June 2026

Ibrahim Diakité (born 23 April 2004) is an Ivorian footballer who plays as a centre-back for F.C. Ashdod.

== Career ==
On 2 July 2025 signed for the Israeli Premier League club F.C. Ashdod for 5 years. Ashdod paid €300,000 for him.
