= Yarin Levi =

Israeli footballer (born 2005)

Personal information
- Full name: Yarin Levi
- Date of birth: 1 August 2005 (age 21)
- Place of birth: Sde Tzvi, Israel
- Position: Central midfielder

Team information
- Current team: Maccabi Haifa
- Number: 8

Youth career
- 2016–2019: Hapoel Be'er Sheva
- 2019–2024: Maccabi Haifa

Senior career*
Years	Team	Apps	(Gls)
2023–	Maccabi Haifa	0	(0)
2024–2026	→ Beitar Jerusalem (loan)	60	(1)

International career^{‡}
2021	Israel U17	12	(0)
2022	Israel U18	3	(0)
2023–2024	Israel U19	5	(0)
2024–	Israel U21	3	(0)
2025–	Israel	4	(0)
- * Club domestic league appearances and goals as of 23 June 2026 ‡ National team caps and goals as of 20:45, 24 September 2026 (UTC)

Yarin Levi (Hebrew: ירין לוי; born 1 August 2005) is an Israeli professional footballer who plays as a midfielder for Maccabi Haifa, and the Israel national team.

== Career ==
Levi started to play football at Hapoel Be'er Sheva and when he was 14 years old signed for Maccabi Haifa. On 19 August 2023 made his senior debut in the 2–0 win against Maccabi Petah Tikva in Toto Cup competition.

On 18 July 2024 signed for 3 years with option for more two years, and loaned to Beitar Jerusalem.

== Career statistics ==
=== Club ===
As of 20 March 2025.

Club	Season	League			State Cup		Toto Cup		Continental		Other		Total	
Club	Season	Division	Apps	Goals	Apps	Goals	Apps	Goals	Apps	Goals	Apps	Goals	Apps	Goals
Maccabi Haifa	2023–24	Israeli Premier League	0	0	0	0	1	0	0	0	0	0	1	0
Maccabi Haifa	Total		0	0	0	0	1	0	0	0	0	0	1	0
Beitar Jerusalem	2024–25	Israeli Premier League	25	0	2	0	5	0	0	0	0	0	32	0
Beitar Jerusalem	Total		25	0	2	0	6	0	0	0	0	0	33	0
Career total			25	0	2	0	6	0	0	0	0	0	33	0
