= Stav Turiel =

Israeli association football player

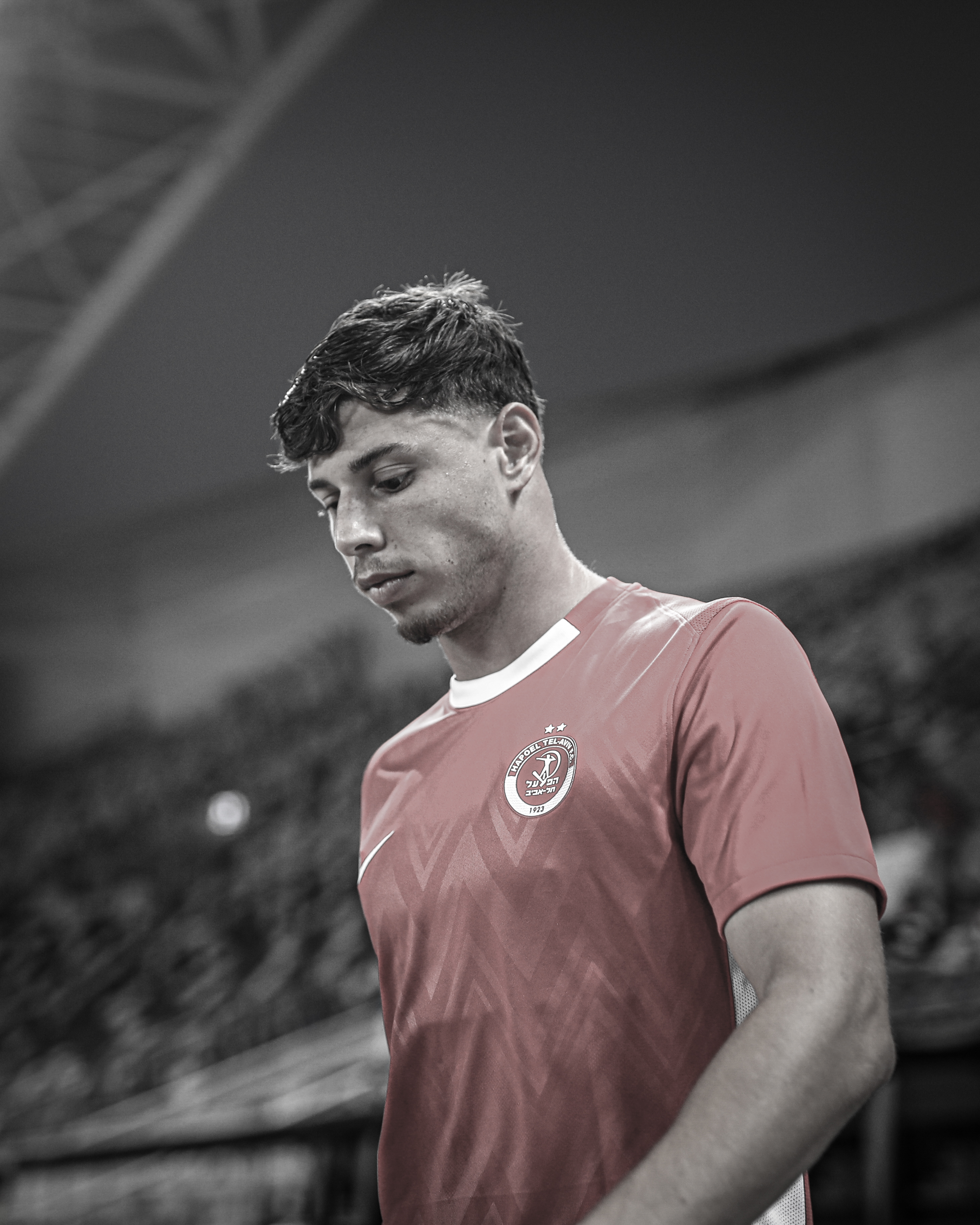

Personal information
- Full name: Stav Turiel
- Date of birth: 14 January 2001 (age 25)
- Place of birth: Bat Yam, Israel
- Height: 1.79 m (5 ft 10 in)
- Position: Right winger

Team information
- Current team: Hapoel Tel Aviv
- Number: 11

Youth career
- 2009–2016: Hapoel Tel Aviv
- 2016–2017: Maccabi Ironi Bat Yam
- 2017–2019: Maccabi Jaffa

Senior career*
Years	Team	Apps	(Gls)
2019–2020	Maccabi Jaffa	13	(2)
2020–2024	F.C. Ashdod	18	(1)
2021–2023	→ Hapoel Kfar Saba (loan)	58	(9)
2024–	Hapoel Tel Aviv	75	(28)

International career^{‡}
2025–	Israel	5	(0)
- * Club domestic league appearances and goals as of 1 June 2025 ‡ National team caps and goals as of 19:00, 3 June 2026 (UTC)

Stav Turiel (Hebrew: סתיו טוריאל; born 14 January 2001) is an Israeli professional footballer who plays as a winger for Israeli club Hapoel Tel Aviv and for the Israel national team.

== Career ==
Turiel was born and raised in Bat Yam, Israel. He began playing football in the youth academy of Hapoel Tel Aviv, before moving to the youth departments of Maccabi Ironi Bat Yam and later Maccabi Kabilio Jaffa.On 6 September 2019 made his senior debut for Maccabi Jaffa in the 1–0 win against Hapoel Azor.

On 19 July 2020, Turiel signed a five-year contract with the Israeli Premier League club F.C. Ashdod. On 18 February 2021 scored his Premier League first goal in the 1–2 loss to Ironi Kiryat Shmona.

In 2021, he was loaned to Hapoel Kfar Saba.

On 6 January 2024 Hapoel Tel Aviv purchased Turiel for 450K NIS.

In December 2025, it was reported that Turiel was expected to leave Hapoel Tel Aviv ahead of the January transfer window after three Major League Soccer clubs, including Chicago Fire, expressed interest in signing him. However, Hapoel Tel Aviv announced that it had exercised the option in his contract for an additional season. His contract reportedly included a release clause valued at approximately €2 million, applicable only to clubs outside Israel.

On 19 January 2026, it was reported that Turiel signed a contract extension with Hapoel Tel Aviv until the 2028–29 season. Under the new agreement, he will earn €270,000 per season, and the contract does not include a release clause.

== Style of play ==
Turiel is an attacking player known for his dominant left foot. His playing style is characterized by attacking presence and the ability to create chances under pressure. He combines goal-scoring ability with playmaking skills.
