= 2025–26 Israel State Cup =

Tournament details
- Country: Israel
- Dates: 29 August 2025 – 26 May 2026
- Teams: 186

Final positions
- Champions: Maccabi Tel Aviv (25th title)
- Runners-up: Hapoel Be'er Sheva

Tournament statistics
- Matches played: 175
- Goals scored: 602 (3.44 per match)

The 2025–26 Israel State Cup (Hebrew: גביע המדינה, Gvia HaMedina) (known as the Gvia HaMedina Winner for sponsorship purposes) was the 87th season of Israel's nationwide Association football cup competition and the 71st after the Israeli Declaration of Independence. The winners qualified for the 2026–27 UEFA Europa League second qualifying round.

== Preliminary rounds ==
=== Liga Bet ===
- Schedule:

==== Liga Bet North A ====
First Round
Bnei Maghar
Hapoel Bnei Bi'ina	(w/o)
28 August 2025
Beitar Nahariya	1
Hapoel Bnei Jadeidi-Makr	0
Hapoel Bnei Ein Mahil
Maccabi Ihud Bnei Ibtin	(w/o)

Second Round
2 September 2025
Hapoel Kaukab	0
Hapoel Bnei Bi'ina (a.e.t.)	1
1 September 2025
Bnei M.M.B.E. (a.e.t.)	2
Beitar Nahariya	1
2 September 2025
Maccabi Bnei Jadeidi-Makr	3
Maccabi Ihud Bnei Ibtin	0
2 September 2025
Hapoel Deir Hanna
Hapoel Ihud Bnei Sumei	(w/o)

Third Round
9 September 2025
Hapoel Bnei Bi'ina	1
Bnei M.M.B.E.	5
6 September 2025
Maccabi Bnei Jadeidi-Makr (p)	1 (5)
Hapoel Ihud Bnei Sumei	1 (3)

Fourth Round
Bnei M.M.B.E.	0
Maccabi Bnei Jadeidi-Makr	4

Maccabi Bnei Jadeidi-Makr and Bnei M.M.B.E. qualified to the sixth round.

==== Liga Bet North B ====
First Round
Maccabi Ahi Iksal
Ihud Bnei Baqa	(w/o)
29 August 2025
Hapoel Daliyat al-Karmel	4
F.C. Tzeirei Haifa	1
29 August 2025
Hapoel Ramot Menashe Megiddo	1 (4)
F.C. Kababir	1 (5)

Second Round
2 September 2025
Beitar Haifa	2
F.C. Tzofi Haifa	1
2 September 2025
Ihud Bnei Baqa	0
Hapoel Daliyat al-Karmel	2
2 September 2025
Hapoel Ihud Bnei Jatt	4
F.C. Kababir	0
2 September 2025
Hapoel Tirat HaCarmel	7
F.C. Bnei Qalansawe	0

Third Round
16 September 2025
Beitar Haifa	2
Hapoel Daliyat al-Karmel	1
5 September 2025
Hapoel Ihud Bnei Jatt	0
Hapoel Tirat HaCarmel	2

Fourth Round
Beitar Haifa	0
Hapoel Tirat HaCarmel	2

Hapoel Tirat HaCarmel and Beitar Haifa qualified to the sixth round.

==== Liga Bet South A ====
First Round
30 August 2025
Maccabi Ironi Kfar Yona	2
Beitar Ramat Gan	3
29 August 2025
Hapoel Hod HaSharon	0
Hapoel Mahane Yehuda	3
28 August 2025
A.S. Holon Mor (p)	0 (5)
Hapoel Kiryat Ono	0 (4)
28 August 2025
Hakoah Amidar Ramat Gan
Beitar Tel Aviv Holon	(w/o)
28 August 2025
Bnei Jaffa Ortodoxim	1
Maccabi Ironi Amishav Petah Tikva	0
27 August 2025
F.C. Hapoel Lod Beni Regev	0
Ironi Beit Dagan	1

Second Round
2 September 2025
Hapoel Kafr Qasim Shouaa	0
Beitar Ramat Gan	1
2 September 2025
Hapoel Mahane Yehuda	1
A.S. Holon Mor	2
5 September 2025
Beitar Petah Tikva	1
Beitar Tel Aviv Holon	2
2 September 2025
Bnei Jaffa Ortodoxim	6
Ironi Beit Dagan	3

Third Round
5 September 2025
Beitar Ramat Gan	3
A.S. Holon Mor	0
9 September 2025
Beitar Tel Aviv Holon	0
Bnei Jaffa Ortodoxim	3

Fourth Round
Beitar Ramat Gan	0 (6)
Bnei Jaffa Ortodoxim (p)	0 (7)

Bnei Jaffa Ortodoxim and Beitar Ramat Gan qualified to the sixth round.

==== Liga Bet South B ====
First Round
28 August 2025
Maccabi Be'er Ya'akov Amit	0
F.C. Shikun HaMizrah	1
Maccabi Be'er Sheva
Hapoel Ironi Ashkelon	(w/o)
28 August 2025
Ironi Beit Shemesh	1
F.C. Hapoel Shaqib al-Salam	2
29 August 2025
F.C. Arad	2
F.C. Hapeol Yeruham	1
28 August 2025
Hapoel Bnei Ashdod	1
Maccabi Ironi Netivot	0

Second Round
2 September 2025
F.C. Shikun HaMizrah	4
F.C. Ramla	2
2 September 2025
Hapoel Ironi Ashkelon	3
F.C. Hapoel Shaqib al-Salam	1
2 September 2025
F.C. Arad	2
Bnei Eilat	3
2 September 2025
F.C. Sderot	5
Hapoel Bnei Ashdod	0

Third Round
5 September 2025
F.C. Shikun HaMizrah	3
Hapoel Ironi Ashkelon	2
5 September 2025
Bnei Eilat	1
F.C. Sderot	2

Fourth Round
16 September 2025
F.C. Shikun HaMizrah	1
F.C. Sderot	0

F.C. Shikun HaMizrah Winner of the district cup and the runners-up F.C. Sderot qualified to the sixth round.

=== Liga Gimel ===
Sources:

- Schedule:

==== Liga Gimel Upper Galilee ====
First Round
30 August 2025
F.C. Beit Jann Rani	4
Hapeol Mi'ilya	0

Second Round
13 September 2025
F.C. Hapeol Yarka	5
F.C. Beit Jann Rani	0
12 September 2025
Hapoel Bnei Peki'in	1
Maccabi Sektzia Ma'alot-Tarshiha	5

Third Round
16 September 2025
F.C. Hapeol Yarka	2 (5)
Maccabi Sektzia Ma'alot-Tarshiha	2 (4)

F.C. Hapeol Yarka won the district cup and qualified to the sixth round.

==== Liga Gimel lower Galilee ====
First Round
30 August 2025
Atletico Shefa-Amr	3
F.C. Kabul (a.e.t.)	4

Second Round
5 September 2025
Ihud Bnei Majd al-Krum (a.e.t.)	1
F.C. Kabul	0
6 September 2025
Hapoel Bnei Deir al-Asad	2
F.C. Shefa-Amr	0

Third Round
13 September 2025
Ihud Bnei Majd al-Krum	5
Hapoel Bnei Deir al-Asad	1

Ihud Bnei Majd al-Krum won the district cup and qualified to the sixth round.

==== Liga Gimel Jezreel ====
First Round
30 August 2025
F.C. Kfar Kama	(w/o)
Maccabi Ahva Fureidis

Second Round
F.C. Al-Nahada Nazareth
F.C. Kfar Kama	(w/o)
6 September 2025
Hapoel Ein as-Sahla	0
Hapoel Tzirei Nazareth	3

Third Round
12 September 2025
F.C. Kfar Kama (a.e.t.)	2
Hapoel Tzirei Nazareth	1

F.C. Kfar Kama won the district cup and qualified to the sixth round.

==== Liga Gimel Samaria ====
First Round
30 August 2025
Hapoel Bnei Jisr az-Zarqa (a.e.t.)	5
Maccabi Isfiya	3

Second Round
5 September 2025
Beitar Kiryat Ata Kfir	2
Hapoel Bnei Jisr az-Zarqa	1
29 August 2025
Hapoel Kiryat Haim Leibovich	0
F.C. Kiryat Haim	2
5 September 2025
F.C. Carmel Haifa	3
Beitar Pardes Hanna	0
9 September 2025
F.C. Pardes Hanna-Karkur Lior Boker	6
Maccabi Barkai	2

Third Round
11 September 2025
Beitar Kiryat Ata Kfir	0
F.C. Kiryat Haim	2
12 September 2025
F.C. Carmel Haifa	1
F.C. Pardes Hanna-Karkur Lior Boker	3

Fourth Round
16 September 2025
F.C. Kiryat Haim	2
F.C. Pardes Hanna-Karkur Lior Boker	1

F.C. Kiryat Haim won the district cup and qualified to the sixth round.

==== Liga Gimel Sharon ====
Second Round
29 August 2025
F.C. Bnei Ra'anana Uzi Cohen	1
Maccabi Ramat HaSharon	2
29 August 2025
Bnei Tira	2
F.C. Tzeiri Qalansawe	1
29 August 2025
Beitar Nes Tubruk	14
Maccabi Oranit	0

Third Round
5 September 2025
Hapoel Oranit Ido Aguzi	3
Maccabi HaSharon Netanya Victor Atia	6
7 September 2025
Hapoel Pardesiya Noam	1
F.C. Tayibe (a.e.t.)	2
6 September 2025
Maccabi Ramat HaSharon	0
Bnei Tira	2
5 September 2025
F.C. Ironi Ariel	4
Beitar Nes Tubruk	0

Fourth Round
13 September 2025
Maccabi HaSharon Netanya Victor Atia	5
F.C. Tayibe	2
11 September 2025
Bnei Tira	1
F.C. Ironi Ariel	3

Fifth Round
16 September 2025
Maccabi HaSharon Netanya Victor Atia	2 (8)
F.C. Ironi Ariel	2 (7)

Maccabi HaSharon Netanya Victor Atia won the district cup and qualified to the sixth round.

==== Liga Gimel Center ====
Second Round
F.C. Be'er Ya'akov Solomon
Bnei Ramla	(w/o)
Maccabi Bnei Abu Ghosh
Sektzia Ness Ziona	(w/o)

Third Round
5 September 2025
Bnei Ramla	1
F.C. Ness Ziona	2
5 September 2025
F.C. Ashdod City	1
Sektzia Ness Ziona	5

Fourth Round
13 September 2025
F.C. Ness Ziona	0
Sektzia Ness Ziona	2

Sektzia Ness Ziona won the district cup and qualified to the sixth round.

==== Liga Gimel Tel Aviv ====
First Round
27 August 2025
Maccabi Spartak Ramat Gan (p)	1 (5)
F.C. Kiryat Ono	1 (3)
27 August 2025
Elitzur Yehud Yutel	3 (1)
Maccabi Yehud-Monosson (p)	3 (3)
26 August 2025
Beitar Ezra	13
Beitar Jaffa Tzion	0

Second Round
29 August 2025
Elitzur Jaffa Tel Aviv	1
Bnei Yehud	4
Maccabi HaShikma Ramat Hen	(w/o)
Maccabi Ironi Bat Yam
30 August 2025
F.C. Dizngoff Tel Aviv	2
Maccabi Spartak Ramat Gan	3
30 August 2025
Maccabi Giv'at Shmuel	5
Hakoah Galei Gil Ramat Gan	0
30 August 2025
Maccabi Yehud-Monosson	1
Beitar Ezra	3
30 August 2025
F.C. Ironi Or Yehuda	3
Shikun Vatikim Ramat Gan	0
29 August 2025
Bnei Herzliya	8
Maccabi Or Yehuda	5
1 September 2025
Hapoel Ramat Yisrael	4
F.C. Tel Aviv Tommy	2

Third Round
10 September 2025
Bnei Yehud	2
Maccabi HaShikma Ramat Hen (a.e.t.)	3
5 September 2025
Maccabi Spartak Ramat Gan	2
Maccabi Giv'at Shmuel	6
6 September 2025
Beitar Ezra	0
F.C. Ironi Or Yehuda	1
5 September 2025
Bnei Herzliya	1
Hapoel Ramat Yisrael	2

Fourth Round
13 September 2025
Maccabi HaShikma Ramat Hen	2
Maccabi Giv'at Shmuel	3
13 September 2025
F.C. Ironi Or Yehuda	2
Hapoel Ramat Yisrael	1

Fifth Round
16 September 2025
Maccabi Giv'at Shmuel	0
F.C. Ironi Or Yehuda	1

F.C. Ironi Or Yehuda won the district cup and qualified to the sixth round.

==== Liga Gimel South ====
First Round
1 September 2025
F.C. Maccabi Ashkelon	2
F.C. Be'er Sheva	0
F.C. Be'er Sheva Shua Tal	(w/o)
F.C. Meitar
Otzma Be'er Sheva	(w/o)
Maccabi Ihud Bnei Kuseife

Second Round
5 September 2025
F.C. Maccabi Ashkelon	3
Bnei Yerucham Almog Dadon	1
6 September 2025
F.C. Be'er Sheva Shua Tal	6
Otzma Be'er Sheva	0

Third Round
12 September 2025
F.C. Maccabi Ashkelon	1
F.C. Be'er Sheva Shua Tal	2

F.C. Be'er Sheva Shua Tal won the district cup and qualified to the sixth round.

== Fifth round ==
Sources:

- Schedule:

The fifth round was played within each division of Liga Alef, split into two regions (Liga Alef North and Liga Alef South).

=== Liga Alef North ===
Home Team	Score	Away Team
28 August 2025
Maccabi Nujeidat	1–2	Hapoel Migdal HaEmek
29 August 2025
Hapoel Ironi Baqa al-Gharbiyye	1–2	Hapoel Umm al-Fahm
Hapoel Ironi Karmiel	5–2	Hapoel Bnei Musmus
Maccabi Ata Bialik	2–0	F.C. Tira
Maccabi Neve Sha'anan Eldad	2–0	F.C. Tzeirei Kafr Kanna
Ironi Nesher	0–2	Maccabi Akhi Nazareth
30 August 2025
Tzeirei Tamra	0–2	Hapoel Ironi Arraba
15 September 2025
Tzeirei Umm al-Fahm	3–0	Hapoel Beit She'an Massilot

=== Liga Alef South ===
Home Team	Score	Away Team
—
—	(w/o)	Shimshon Tel Aviv
27 August 2025
F.C. Jerusalem	1–0	F.C. Tzeirei Tira
28 August 2025
F.C. Dimona	1–0 (a.e.t.)	Hapoel Azor
Hapoel Herzliya	1–4	F.C. Kfar Saba
29 August 2025
A.S. Nordia Jerusalem	2–3	Holon Yermiyahu
F.C. Beitar Yavne	0–3	Maccabi Yavne
Maccabi Kiryat Gat	4–0	Hapoel Marmorek
1 September 2025
Maccabi Kiryat Malakhi	0–1	Maccabi Ironi Ashdod

== Sixth round ==
The 16 preliminary rounds winners (8 from Liga Bet and 8 from Liga Gimel), 16 fifth round winners (8 from each division) played in this round

Sources:

- Schedule:
- Results:

Home Team	Score	Away Team
30 Seprmber 2025
F.C. Jerusalem (3)	6–0	Ihud Bnei Majd al-Krum (5)
Tzeirei Umm al-Fahm (3)	0–3	Maccabi Ata Bialik (3)
F.C. Kiryat Haim (5)	1–1 (3–4 p)	F.C. Hapeol Yarka (5)
Beitar Haifa (4)	0–5	Maccabi Ironi Ashdod (3)
Hapoel Umm al-Fahm (3)	7–0	F.C. Be'er Sheva Shua Tal (5)
Maccabi Bnei Jadeidi-Makr (4)	5–1	Hapoel Migdal HaEmek (3)
Bnei M.M.B.E. (4)	0–2	Shimshon Tel Aviv (3)
Sektzia Ness Ziona (5)	1–2 (a.e.t.)	Hapoel Ironi Karmiel (3)
Maccabi Akhi Nazareth (3)	2–1	Beitar Ramat Gan (4)
F.C. Sderot (4)	2–1	Hapoel Ironi Arraba (3)
F.C. Kfar Saba (3)	2–0 (a.e.t.)	Maccabi Yavne (3)
F.C. Kfar Kama (5)	0–1	Maccabi Kiryat Gat (3)
F.C. Ironi Or Yehuda (5)	1–3	F.C. Dimona (3)
F.C. Shikun HaMizrah (4)	0–5	Holon Yermiyahu (3)
Hapoel Tirat HaCarmel (4)	0–1	Maccabi Neve Sha'anan Eldad (3)
27 October 2025
Maccabi HaSharon Netanya Victor Atia (5)	1–6	F.C. Bnei Jaffa Ortodoxim (3)

== Seventh round ==
The 16 sixth round winners and 12 teams from the 2025–26 Liga Leumit entered the seventh round (Maccabi Jaffa, Bnei Yehuda Tel Aviv, Hapoel Kfar Shalem and Hapoel Kfar Saba received byes to the next round)

Home Team	Score	Away Team
28 October 2025
Maccabi Bnei Jadeidi-Makr (4)	0–1	Hapoel Ra'anana (2)
F.C. Hapeol Yarka (5)	0–4	Maccabi Kiryat Gat (3)
Holon Yermiyahu (3)	1–0	Hapoel Nof HaGalil (2)
Shimshon Tel Aviv (3)	0–2	F.C. Kafr Qasim (2)
Maccabi Neve Sha'anan Eldad (3)	1–4	Hapoel Karmiel (3)
Ironi Modi'in (2)	1–3	Maccabi Akhi Nazareth (3)
Maccabi Herzliya (2)	2–0	Hapoel Acre (2)
Hapoel Afula (2)	2–3 (a.e.t.)	Maccabi Ata Bialik (3)
Hapoel Umm al-Fahm (3)	2–1	F.C. Kiryat Yam (2)
F.C. Kfar Saba (3)	1–0	Hapoel Rishon LeZion (2)
Maccabi Ironi Ashdod (3)	2–3	Hapoel Ramat Gan Givatayim (2)
29 October 2025
Hapoel Hadera (2)	3–4 (a.e.t.)	F.C. Sderot (4)
F.C. Dimona (3)	1–0	Maccabi Petah Tikva (2)
30 October 2025
F.C. Bnei Jaffa Ortodoxim (4)	1–0	F.C. Jerusalem (3)

== Eighth round ==
The 14 seventh round winners, the four 2024–25 Liga Leumit teams given seventh round byes, and the 14 teams from the 2024–25 Israeli Premier League entered the eighth round.

Home Team	Score	Away Team
25 December 2025
Hapoel Petah Tikva (1)	2–1	Hapoel Ironi Karmiel (3)
Hapoel Ra'anana (2)	3–3 (9–8 p)	Maccabi Kiryat Gat (3)
Bnei Sakhnin (1)	0–2	Maccabi Jaffa (2)
Bnei Yehuda Tel Aviv (2)	2–1	Maccabi Ata Bialik (3)
Hapoel Tel Aviv (1)	3–0	F.C. Ashdod (1)
26 December 2025
F.C. Kafr Qasim (2)	3–1	Holon Yermiyahu (3)
Maccabi Herzliya (2)	4–1	F.C. Kfar Saba (3)
F.C. Dimona (3)	1–3	Hapoel Kfar Saba (2)
Maccabi Bnei Reineh (1)	1–0	Hapoel Kfar Shalem (2)
F.C. Bnei Jaffa Ortodoxim (4)	0–6	Maccabi Netanya (1)
Hapoel Jerusalem (1)	2–0	Hapoel Umm al-Fahm (3)
Hapoel Ramat Gan (2)	2–3	Ironi Kiryat Shmona (1)
27 December 2025
Maccabi Akhi Nazareth (3)	1–8	Maccabi Haifa (1)
Maccabi Tel Aviv (1)	5–0	Hapoel Haifa (1)
Hapoel Be'er Sheva (1)	2–1	F.C. Sderot (4)
Ironi Tiberias (1)	1–2	Beitar Jerusalem (1)

== Round of 16 ==
The 16 eighth round winners entered the round of 16.

Home team	Score	Away team
13 January 2026
Maccabi Netanya (1)	0–2	Maccabi Jaffa (2)
Bnei Yehuda Tel Aviv (2)	0–0 (3–2 p)	Maccabi Herzliya (2)
Hapoel Be'er Sheva (1)	2–1	Hapoel Jerusalem (1)
Hapoel Petah Tikva (1)	1–2	Maccabi Bnei Reineh (1)
14 January 2026
Hapoel Ra'anana (2)	0–1	Maccabi Haifa (1)
Hapoel Tel Aviv (1)	1–1 (4–5 p)	Maccabi Tel Aviv (1)
Ironi Kiryat Shmona (1)	0–2	Beitar Jerusalem (1)
15 January 2026
F.C. Kafr Qasim (2)	1–0	Hapoel Kfar Saba (2)

== Quarter-finals ==
The 8 round of 16 winners were drawn on 15 January 2026.

Home team	Score	Away team
3 February 2025
Maccabi Haifa (1)	2–0	F.C. Kafr Qasim (2)
4 February 2025
Maccabi Bnei Reineh (1)	0–3	Hapoel Be'er Sheva (1)
Beitar Jerusalem (1)	1–2	Bnei Yehuda Tel Aviv (2)
5 February 2025
Maccabi Jaffa (2)	0–5	Maccabi Tel Aviv (1)

== Semi-finals ==
Home team	Score	Away team
9 April 2026
Hapoel Be'er Sheva (1)	3–2 (a.e.t.)	Bnei Yehuda Tel Aviv (2)
15 April 2026
Maccabi Tel Aviv (1)	3–2	Maccabi Haifa (1)

== Final ==
26 May 2026	Hapoel Be'er Sheva (1)	1–2	Maccabi Tel Aviv (1)	Jerusalem
20:30	Abu Rumi 12'		Revivo 64'; Varela 58'	Stadium: Teddy Stadium; Referee: David Fuxman
