= 2023–24 Maccabi Haifa F.C. season =

Football season

Maccabi Haifa
2023–24 season
- President: Ya'akov Shahar
- Head coach: Messay Dego
- Stadium: Sammy Ofer
- Ligat Ha'Al: 2nd
- State Cup: Quarter-finals
- Toto Cup: Runners-up
- Super Cup: Winners
- Champions League: Play-off round
- Europa League: Group stage
- Conference League: Round of 16
- Top goalscorer: League: Dean David (20 goals); All: Dean David; Frantzdy Pierrot (26 each)
- Highest home attendance: 29,864 (vs Young Boys 23 August 2023)
- Lowest home attendance: 1,274 (vs Gent 15 February 2024
- Average home league attendance: 21,141
Home colours	Away colours	Third colours
- All statistics correct as of 21 May 2024.

The 2023–24 season was Maccabi Haifa's 66th season in the Israeli Premier League, and their 42nd consecutive season in the top division of Israeli football.

== Squad ==
=== Squad information ===
N	Pos.	Nat.	Name	Age	Since	App	Goals	Ends	Transfer fee	Notes
2	DF	(Sweden)	Daniel Sundgren	35	2022/2023	81	1	2023/2024	Free	
3	DF	(Israel)	Sean Goldberg (vice captain)	31	2021/2022	141	4	2025/2026	Free	Second nationality:Italy
4	MF	(Niger)	Ali Mohamed	31	2021/2022	151	2	2026/2027	1,400,000€	Second nationality:Israel
5	MF	(Angola)	Manuel Cafumana "Show"	27	2023/2024	31	0	2026/2027	1,200,000€	
6	MF	(Israel)	Gadi Kinda	32	2023/2024	27	4	2026/2027	Free	Second nationality:Ethiopia
8	MF	(Israel)	Dolev Haziza	33	2019/2020	183	31	2026/2027	310,000€	Second nationality:France
9	FW	(Haiti)	Frantzdy Pierrot	31	2022/2023	103	40	2024/2025	1,700,000€	Second nationality:United States
11	MF	(Israel)	Lior Refaelov (captain)	40	2004/2005	306	56	2024/2025	Free	Originally from youth system Second nationality:Belgium
14	MF	(Israel)	Lior Kasa	21	2023/2024	11	0	2027/2028	1,100,000€	Second nationality:Ethiopia
15	MF	(United States)	Kenny Saief	32	2023/2024	26	0	2023/2024	Free	Second nationality:Israel
17	FW	(Israel)	Suf Podgoreanu	24	2019/2020	40	3	2025/2026	Free	Originally from youth system Second nationality:Romania
18	MF	(Israel)	Goni Naor	27	2022/2023	43	1	2024/2025	542,000€	
19	FW	(Germany)	Erik Shuranov	24	2023/2024	11	2	2025/2026	1,000,000€	Second nationality:Ukraine
21	FW	(Israel)	Dean David	30	2021/2022	157	65	2025/2026	1,100,000€	
22	DF	(Israel)	Ilay Feingold	22	2023/2024	31	0	2025/2026	Youth system	
23	DF	(Israel)	Maor Kandil	32	2023/2024	37	1	2025/2026	Free	
25	FW	(Israel)	Anan Khalaily	22	2021/2022	53	15	2026/2027	Youth system	
26	MF	(Israel)	Mahmoud Jaber	27	2021/2022	92	4	2026/2027	Youth system	
27	DF	(France)	Pierre Cornud	29	2022/2023	91	1	2025/2026	Free	Second nationality:Israel
28	MF	(Israel)	Ilay Hagag	25	2021/2022	22	3	2025/2026	Youth system	
29	FW	(Israel)	Tomer Hemed	39	2005/2005	91	27	2023/2024	Free	Originally from youth system Second nationality:Poland
30	DF	(Senegal)	Abdoulaye Seck	34	2022/2023	82	9	2025/2026	400,000€	
31	MF	(Russia)	Daniil Lesovoy	28	2023/2024	9	0	2023/2024	Free	Second nationality:Israel
32	MF	(Israel)	Ziv Ben Shimol	22	2021/2022	4	0	2024/2025	Youth system	
40	GK	(Israel)	Shareef Kayouf	25	2021/2022	46	0	2028/2029	Youth system	
44	DF	(Croatia)	Lorenco Šimić	30	2023/2024	36	1	2025/2026	1,000,000€	
55	DF	(Israel)	Rami Gershon	38	2017/2018	132	2	2023/2024	400,000€	
77	GK	(Israel)	Roee Fucs	27	2020/2021	3	0	2023/2024	Youth system	

- Last updated: 26 May 2024
- Source: mhaifafc.com
- Ordered by squad number.

=== Current coaching staff ===
Position	Staff
Head Coach	(Israel) Messay Dego
Assistant Coach	(Serbia) Dušan Matović
Assistant Coach	(Israel) Shahar Weisinger
Goalkeeping Coach	(Israel) Itay Zilpa
Physical trainer	(Israel) Dror Shimshon
Physical trainer	(Israel) Uri Harel
Physical trainer	(Israel) Gal Vaknin
Video analyst	(Israel) Eyal Gabay
Mental coach	(Israel) Elad Ashkenazi
Sport Director	(Israel) Gal Alberman
Club Administrator	(Israel) Gil Ofek

Last updated: 30 June 2023
Source: F.C. Maccabi Haifa Official Website

=== Kits ===
- Supplier: Adidas
- Main Sponsor: Volvo
- Secondary Sponsor: Amram Abrahm, Variety Israel
- Sleeve sponsor: TATAMI

Home	Away	Third

== New contracts and transfers ==
=== New contracts ===
Date	Pos.	Player	Age	Expires	Fee	Source
27 April 2023	DF	(Israel) Roey Elimelech	24	June 2027		
17 May 2023	DF	(Israel) Rami Gershon	38	June 2024		
21 May 2023	FW	(Israel) Dean David	30	June 2024		
17 May 2023	DF	(France) Pierre Cornud	29	June 2026		
6 July 2023	FW	(Israel) Suf Podgoreanu	24	June 2026	500,000€	
17 July 2023	FW	(Israel) Dia Sabi'a	33	June 2028		
29 July 2023	MF	(Israel) Mahmoud Jaber	27	June 2027		
24 August 2023	MF	(Israel) Dolev Haziza	31	June 2027		
25 August 2023	DF	(Senegal) Abdoulaye Seck	34	June 2026		
20 September 2023	MF	(Niger) Ali Mohamed	31	June 2027		
10 December 2023	FW	(Israel) Anan Khalaily	22	June 2027		
6 March 2024	MF	(Israel) Lior Refaelov	40	June 2025		
10 April 2024	GK	(Israel) Shareef Keouf	25	June 2029		

=== Transfers in ===
Date	Pos.	Player	Age	From	Fee	Source
23 May 2023	FW	(Germany) Erik Shuranov	24	(Germany) 1. FC Nürnberg	1,000,000€	
14 June 2023	DF	(Israel) Maor Kandil	32	(Israel) Maccabi Tel Aviv	Free	
15 June 2023	MF	(Israel) Lior Refaelov	40	(Belgium) Anderlecht	Free	
23 June 2023	GK	(Israel) Itamar Nitzan	39	(Israel) Maccabi Netanya	Free	
14 August 2023	MF	(Angola) Manuel Cafumana "Show"	27	(Bulgaria) Ludogorets Razgrad	1,200,000€	
21 August 2023	DF	(Croatia) Lorenco Šimić	29	(Italy) Ascoli	1,000,000€	
19 December 2023	MF	(United States) Kenny Saief	32	(Azerbaijan) Neftçi	Free	
4 January 2024	MF	(Israel) Gadi Kinda	32	(United States) Sporting Kansas City	Free	
18 January 2024	FW	(Israel) Tomer Hemed	39	(Israel) Hapoel Be'er Sheva	Free	
23 January 2024	MF	(Israel) Lior Kasa	21	(Israel) Hapoel Jerusalem	1,100,000€	

=== Transfers out ===
Date	Pos.	Player	Age	Type	To	Fee	Source
31 May 2023	GK	(Israel) Roi Mishpati	32	End of Contract	(Israel) Maccabi Tel Aviv	Free	
31 May 2023	DF	(Democratic Republic of the Congo) Dylan Batubinsika	30	End of loan	(Portugal) F.C. Famalicão	Free	
5 June 2023	DF	(Israel) Inon Eliyahu	33	End of Contract	(Israel) Hapoel Haifa	Free	
5 June 2023	FW	(Israel) Ben Sahar	37	End of Contract	(Israel) Maccabi Petah Tikva	Free	
8 June 2023	FW	(Australia) (Israel) Nikita Rukavytsya	39	End of Contract		Free	
14 June 2023	FW	(Israel) Omer Atzili	33	Transfer	(United Arab Emirates) Al Ain	2,000,000€	
15 June 2023	MF	(Israel) Mohammad Abu Fani	28	Transfer	(Hungary) Ferencvárosi	1,500,000€	
26 June 2023	DF	(Israel) Raz Meir	29	Transfer	(Netherlands) Waalwijk		
3 August 2023	FW	(Republic of the Congo) Mavis Tchibota	30	Transfer	(Israel) Hapoel Tel Aviv		
30 August 2023	MF	(Israel) Bassam Zarora	23	Transfer	(Israel) Maccabi Netanya	23,000€	
9 May 2024	DF	(Israel) Sun Menahem	33	Retired			
24 May 2024	GK	(Israel) Itamar Nitzan	39	Retired			
26 May 2024	MF	(Suriname) Tjaronn Chery	38	Transfer	(Belgium) Royal Antwerp	Free	

=== Loans in ===
Date	Position	Player	Age	From	Fee	Source
2 February 2024	MF	(Russia) Daniil Lesovoy	28	(Russia) Dynamo Moscow	Free	

=== Loans return ===
Date	Position	Player	Age	From	Fee	Source
14 June 2023	DF	(Israel) Ori Dahan	26	(Israel) Beitar Jerusalem		
29 January 2024	GK	(Israel) Nitai Greis	22	(Israel) Hapoel Afula	Free	
29 January 2024	MF	(Israel) Ziv Ben Shimol	22	(Israel) Hapoel Afula	Free	

=== Loans out ===
Date	Pos.	Player	Age	To	Fee	Source
21 June 2023	MF	(Israel) Maor Levi	26	(Israel) Maccabi Petah Tikva	Free	
17 August 2023	MF	(Israel) Aviel Zargari	23	(Israel) Maccabi Petah Tikva	Free	
30 August 2023	DF	(Israel) Ori Dahan	26	(Israel) Beitar Jerusalem	Free	
5 September 2023	DF	(Israel) Roey Elimelech	24	(Israel) Hapoel Petah Tikva	Free	
25 January 2024	MF	(Suriname) Tjaronn Chery	38	(Netherlands) Nijmegen	Free	
27 January 2024	MF	(Israel) Hamza Shibli	22	(Israel) Hapoel Petah Tikva	Free	
3 February 2024	MF	(Israel) Dia Sabia	33	(United Arab Emirates) Emirates Club	Free	

== Pre-season and friendlies ==
Win Draw Loss

21 June 2023	Maccabi Haifa (Israel)	0–1	(Greece) Aris Thessaloniki	Nof HaGalil
21:00		Report	83' (pen.) Christodoulopoulos	Stadium: Green Stadium

24 June 2023	Maccabi Haifa (Israel)	4–1	(Greece) Aris Thessaloniki	Nof HaGalil
	Kandil 6'; Shibli 46'; Zarora 74'; Tchibota 77'	Report	85' Palma	Stadium: Green Stadium

29 June 2023	Maccabi Haifa (Israel)	3–0	(Romania) FC Universitatea Cluj	Andorf
19:30 (IDT)	Zargari 49'; David 69'; Seba 89'	Report		Stadium: DAXL-Arena Andorf

2 July 2023	Maccabi Haifa (Israel)	1–2	(Czech Republic) Slavia Prague	Andorf
19:00 (IDT)	Shuranov 5'	Report	10' Plavšić; 89' Daniel Smiga	Stadium: DAXL-Arena Andorf

5 July 2023	Maccabi Haifa (Israel)	0–1	(Austria) St. Pölten	Andorf
18:00 (IDT)		Report	41' Andree Neumayer	Stadium: DAXL-Arena Andorf

13 September 2023	Maccabi Haifa	5–1	Hapoel Afula
		Report

== Competitions ==
=== Overview ===
Competition	First match	Last match	Starting round	Final position	Record							
Competition	First match	Last match	Starting round	Final position	Pld	W	D	L	GF	GA	GD	Win %
Ligat Ha'Al	3 September 2023	25 May 2024	Matchday 1	Runners-up	36	23	7	6	75	26	+49	63.89
State Cup	28 January 2024	3 April 2024	Round of 32	Quarter-finals	3	2	0	1	9	6	+3	66.67
Toto Cup	19 August 2023	24 January 2024	European qualification route	Runners-up	2	1	1	0	2	0	+2	50.00
Super Cup	22 July 2023	22 July 2023	Final	Winners	1	1	0	0	3	1	+2	100.00
Champions League	11 July 2023	29 August 2023	First qualifying round	Play-off round	8	5	1	2	15	8	+7	62.50
UEFA Europa League	21 September 2023	14 December 2023	Group stage	Group stage	6	1	2	3	3	9	−6	16.67
UEFA Europa Conference League	15 February 2024	14 March 2024	Knockout round play-offs	Round of 16	4	1	1	2	6	5	+1	25.00
Total					60	34	12	14	113	55	+58	56.67

Last updated: 26 May 2024
Source: Competitions

== Ligat Ha'Al ==
=== Regular season ===
==== Regular season table ====
Pos	Team	Pld	W	D	L	GF	GA	GD	Pts	Qualification
1	Maccabi Tel Aviv	26	19	5	2	55	20	+35	62 (Note: Maccabi Tel Aviv had 1 point deducted. but after appeal the 1 point was returned)	Qualification for the Championship round
2	Maccabi Haifa	26	17	6	3	55	18	+37	55 (Note: Maccabi Haifa had 2 points deducted.)	Qualification for the Championship round
3	Hapoel Be'er Sheva	26	15	4	7	45	19	+26	49	Qualification for the Championship round
4	Hapoel Haifa	26	14	5	7	38	32	+6	47	Qualification for the Championship round
5	Maccabi Bnei Reineh	26	8	10	8	27	26	+1	34	Qualification for the Championship round

Source: Soccerway
Rules for classification: 1) Points; 2) Goal difference; 3) Matches won; 4) Goals scored; 5) Head-to-head points; 6) Head-to-head goal difference; 7) Head-to-head goals scored; 8) Play-off.

==== Matches ====
Win Draw Loss

3 September 2023 2	Hapoel Jerusalem	1–2	Maccabi Haifa	Jerusalem
20:00	Don 45'; Bačo (yellow card) 84'	Report	34' Seck; 37' Sabia; (yellow card) 88' Nitzan	Stadium: Teddy Stadium; Attendance: 7,627; Referee: Ygal Frid

17 September 2023 3	Maccabi Petah Tikva	3–2	Maccabi Haifa	Petah Tikva
20:00	Ben Haim 34'; Mahamid 80'; Jabaar (yellow card) 87'; Levkovich (yellow card) 90+1'; Gorno 90+6'	Report	45+1', (yellow card) 77' Refaelov; (yellow card) 84' Chery; 88' Sabia; (yellow card) 90+11' Jaber	Stadium: HaMoshava Stadium; Attendance: 11,332; Referee: Aviad Shiloach

27 September 2023 4	Maccabi Haifa	1–1	Bnei Sakhnin	Haifa
20:00	Pierrot 45+4'; Mohamed (yellow card) 61'; Sabia (yellow card) 78'	Report	40' Păun; (yellow card) 49' Hilo	Stadium: Sammy Ofer Stadium; Attendance: 21,127; Referee: Shalom Ben Avraham

1 October 2023 5	Maccabi Netanya	2–3	Maccabi Haifa	Netanya
20:15	Zlatanović 11'; Karmi (yellow card) 25'; Chirino 37'; Abu Hanna (yellow card) 58'; Enow (yellow card) 66'; Jaber (yellow card) 77'; Shviro (yellow card) 88'	Report	25' (pen.), (yellow card) 77' Chery; 41', 62' Pierrot; (yellow card) 71' Cafumana; (yellow card) 90+2' Mohamed	Stadium: Netanya Stadium; Attendance: 12,200; Referee: Igal Frid

25 November 2023 1	Maccabi Haifa	2–1	Hapoel Petah Tikva	Haifa
20:00	Hagag 18'; Chery 43'	Report	49' Elimelech	Stadium: Sammy Ofer Stadium; Attendance: 0 (Note: Played Behind closed doors due to the Gaza war); Referee: Orel Grinfeld
Note: originally scheduled for 26 August due Maccabi Haifa play in Champions League Playoff was scheduled for 2 November 2023 due to the Gaza war The league was postponed indefinitely.

3 December 2023 6	Maccabi Haifa	1–0	Hapoel Be'er Sheva	Haifa
20:30	Seck (yellow card) 5'; Cornud (yellow card) 80'; Sundgren (yellow card) 90+1'; David 90+3'	Report	(yellow card) 56' Badash; (yellow card) 58' Bareiro	Stadium: Sammy Ofer Stadium; Attendance: 0 Referee: Roi Reinshreiber
Note: originally scheduled for 8 October 2023 due to the Gaza war The league was postponed indefinitely.

10 December 2023 8	Maccabi Haifa	1–1	Beitar Jerusalem	Haifa
20:30	Seck (yellow card) 11'; Keouf (yellow card) 18'; Pierrot (yellow card) 66', (goal) 69'; Shibli (yellow card) 71'; Cornud (yellow card) 89'; Jaber (yellow card) 89'	Report	20' (pen.), (yellow card) 89' Shua; (red card) 79' Silva	Stadium: Sammy Ofer Stadium; Attendance: 0 Referee: Snir Levi
Note: originally scheduled for 30 October 2023 due to the Gaza war The league was postponed indefinitely.

17 December 2023 9	Hapoel Haifa	0–3	Maccabi Haifa	Haifa
20:30	Serdal (yellow card) 45'; Kamara (yellow card) 73'		4', 58' Refaelov; (yellow card) 80' Kandil; (yellow card) 87' Podgoreanu; 90+1' David	Stadium: Sammy Ofer Stadium; Attendance: 0 Referee: Aviad Shiloach
Note: originally scheduled for 6 November 2023 due to the Gaza war The league was postponed indefinitely.

20 December 2023 10	Maccabi Haifa	4–0	F.C. Ashdod	Haifa
20:00	David 63', 90+3'; Pierrot 76', 87'; Feingold (yellow card) 76'	Report	(yellow card) 77' Harush	Stadium: Sammy Ofer Stadium; Attendance: 5,000 (Note: due to the Gaza war the Home Front Command and the Israel Football Association was limited the number of attendance to 5,000); Referee: Idan Leiba
Note: originally scheduled for 10 November 2023 due to the Gaza war The league was postponed indefinitely.

24 December 2023 11	Hapoel Hadera	1–5	Maccabi Haifa	Netanya
20:30	Glazer (yellow card) 8'; Madmon 12'; Ipole (yellow card) 24'; Shoolmayster (yellow card) 31'; Lababidi (yellow card) 43' (yellow-red card) 44'	Report	29', 58' Hagag; 37' Khalaily; 45' Refaelov; 51' (pen.) Pierrot	Stadium: Netanya Stadium; Attendance: 5,000; Referee: Igal Frid
Note: originally scheduled for 3 December 2023 due to the Gaza war The league was postponed indefinitely.

27 December 2023 12	Maccabi Haifa	1–0	Maccabi Bnei Reineh	Haifa
20:00	Refaelov (yellow card) 10', (goal) 68'; Cornud (yellow card) 57'	Report	(yellow card) 57' Ghanem; (yellow card) 63' Ljubisavljević; (yellow card) 82' Rabah	Stadium: Sammy Ofer Stadium; Attendance: 5,000; Referee: Snir Levi
Note: originally scheduled for 6 December 2023 due to the Gaza war The league was postponed indefinitely.

31 December 2023 13	Hapoel Tel Aviv	0–0	Maccabi Haifa	Tel Aviv
20:30			(yellow card) 30' Feingold; (yellow card) 54' Sundgren; (yellow card) 82' Pierrot	Stadium: Bloomfield Stadium; Attendance: 11,800 (Note: due to the Gaza war the Home Front Command and the Israel Football Association was limited the number of attendance to 15,000); Referee: Aviad Shiloah
Note: originally scheduled for 10 December 2023 due to the Gaza war The league was postponed indefinitely.

3 January 2024 14	Hapoel Petah Tikva	2–2	Maccabi Haifa	Petah Tikva
20:15	Elimelech 45', 49'; Broun (yellow card) 40' (yellow-red card) 90+2'		40', (yellow card) 79' Goldberg; (yellow card) 35' Khalaily; 70', (yellow card) 90+3' Pierrot; (yellow card) 90+2' Chery	Stadium: HaMoshava Stadium; Attendance: 8,612; Referee: Nael Odeh
Note: originally scheduled for 16 December 2023 due to the Gaza war The league was postponed indefinitely.

7 January 2024 15	Maccabi Haifa	2–1	Hapoel Jerusalem	Haifa
20:30	Goldberg 9'; Pierrot 44'; Jaber (yellow card) 49'; Refaelov (yellow card) 61'; Naor (yellow card) 90+1'	Report	Nidam (yellow card) 62'; 29' (pen.) Hozez; (yellow card) 70' Ashta	Stadium: Sammy Ofer Stadium; Attendance: 14,432; Referee: Idan Leiba
Note: originally scheduled for 26 December 2023 due to the Gaza war The league was postponed indefinitely.

10 January 2024 7	Maccabi Tel Aviv	0–1	Maccabi Haifa	Tel Aviv
20:30	Cohen (yellow card) 50'; Revivo (yellow card) 84'; Saborit (yellow card) 90+3'	Report	12' Refaelov; (yellow card) 45' Jaber; (yellow card) 56' Mohamed; (yellow card) 88' Podgoreanu	Stadium: Bloomfield Stadium; Attendance: 14,223; Referee: Orel Grinfeld
Note: originally scheduled for 21 October 2023 due to the Gaza war The league was postponed indefinitely.

14 January 2024 16	Maccabi Haifa	5–0	Maccabi Petah Tikva	Haifa
20:30	Refaelov 33', (yellow card) 71'; Khalaily 39'; Naor 65'; David 69'; Goldberg 84'; Cornud (yellow card) 90'	Report	(yellow card) 18' Zargari; (yellow card) 86' Levi	Stadium: Sammy Ofer Stadium; Attendance: 14,182; Referee: Erez Papir
Note: originally scheduled for 30 December 2023 due to the Gaza war The league was postponed indefinitely.

17 January 2024 17	Bnei Sakhnin	0–3	Maccabi Haifa	Sakhnin
20:00		Report	6' Khalaily; 56', 62' David	Stadium: Doha Stadium; Attendance: 4,075; Referee: Snir Levi
Note: originally scheduled for 6 January 2024 due to the Gaza war The league was postponed indefinitely.

21 January 2024 18	Maccabi Haifa	4–0	Maccabi Netanya	Haifa
20:30	David 38', 64'; Khalaily 42'; Naor (yellow card) 53'; Pierrot 90+2'	Report	(yellow card) 19' Plakuschenko; (yellow card) 19' Galabov; (yellow card) 26' Jaber	Stadium: Sammy Ofer Stadium; Attendance: 14,408; Referee: Gal Leibovich
Note: originally scheduled for 13 January 2024 due to the Gaza war The league was postponed indefinitely.

31 January 2024 19	Hapoel Be'er Sheva	2–1	Maccabi Haifa	Be'er Sheva
20:30	Antonio Sefer 50'; Lopes 71'	Report	(yellow card) 22' (yellow-red card) 23' Pierrot; (yellow card) 55' David; 88' Hemed	Stadium: Turner Stadium; Attendance: 14,249; Referee: Gal Leibovich
Note: originally scheduled for 20 January 2024 due to the Gaza war The league was postponed indefinitely.

5 February 2024 20	Maccabi Haifa	2–0	Maccabi Tel Aviv	Haifa
20:30	Šimić 3'; David 22'; Kinda (yellow card) 32'; Saief (yellow card) 62'; Sundgren (yellow card) 79'	Report	(yellow card) 74' Baltaxa	Stadium: Sammy Ofer Stadium; Attendance: 14,555; Referee: Orel Grinfeld
Note: originally scheduled for 27 January 2024 due to the Gaza war The league was postponed indefinitely.

10 February 2024 21	Beitar Jerusalem	0–2	Maccabi Haifa	Jerusalem
20:00	Yona (yellow card) 13'; Zasno (yellow card) 44'	Report	45' Khalaily; 50' David	Stadium: Teddy Stadium; Attendance: 19,980; Referee: Roi Reinshreiber
Note: originally scheduled for 3 February 2024 due to the Gaza war The league was postponed indefinitely.

18 February 2024 22	Maccabi Haifa	1–1	Hapoel Haifa	Haifa
20:30	Refaelov (penalty missed) 10', (yellow card) 83'; Kinda 15', (yellow card) 64'; Sundgren (yellow card) 53'; Cafumana (yellow card) 90'	Report	(yellow card) 18' Kamara; 56' Yosefi; (yellow card) 67' Diba; (yellow card) 81' Mayembo	Stadium: Sammy Ofer Stadium; Attendance: 28,787; Referee: Snir Levi
Note: originally scheduled for 10 February 2024 due to the Gaza war The league was postponed indefinitely.

25 February 2024 23	F.C. Ashdod	0–5	Maccabi Haifa	Ashdod
20:00	Henty (red card) 19'; Levi (yellow card) 52'; Cohen (yellow card) 58'; Atemengue (yellow card) 79'	Report	6', 25', 39', 41' Pierrot; 25', (yellow card) 52' Cornud	Stadium: Yud-Alef Stadium; Referee: David Fuxman
Note: originally scheduled for 17 February 2024 due to the Gaza war The league was postponed indefinitely.

3 March 2024 24	Maccabi Haifa	1–0	Hapoel Hadera	Haifa
20:00	Refaelov (yellow card) 38'; Kinda 62'; Seck (yellow card) 63'; Keouf (yellow card) 82'	Report	(yellow card) 34' Levita	Stadium: Sammy Ofer Stadium; Attendance: 27,342; Referee: Ygal Frid
Note: originally scheduled for 24 February 2024 due to the Gaza war The league was postponed indefinitely.

10 March 2024 25	Maccabi Bnei Reineh	2–1	Maccabi Haifa	Nof HaGalil
20:00	Sambinha (yellow card) 14'; Usman (yellow card) 41'; Azulay 65'; Eyad Hutba (yellow card) 67'; Ghanem 69'; Shukrani (yellow card) 83'; Góndola (yellow card) 90+1'; Amos (yellow card) 90+3'	Report	15' (pen.) Khalaily; (yellow card) 21' Saief; (yellow card) 45' Pierrot; (yellow card) 71' Cornud	Stadium: Green Stadium; Referee: Roi Reinshreiber
Note: originally scheduled for 2 March 2024 due to the Gaza war The league was postponed indefinitely.

17 March 2024 26	Maccabi Haifa	0–0	Hapoel Tel Aviv	Haifa
20:30	Mohamed (yellow card) 44'; Sundgren (yellow card) 61'; Hemed (yellow card) 80'; Saief (yellow card) 82'; Cornud (yellow card) 89'	Report	(yellow card) 59' Meir	Stadium: Sammy Ofer Stadium; Attendance: 28,230; Referee: Orel Grinfeld
Note: originally scheduled for 9 March 2024 due to the Gaza war The league was postponed indefinitely.

==== Results overview ====
Win Draw Loss

Opposition	Home score	Away score
Beitar Jerusalem	1–1	2–0
Bnei Sakhnin	1–1	3–0
F.C. Ashdod	4–0	5–0
Hapoel Be'er Sheva	1–0	1–2
Hapoel Hadera	1–0	5–1
Hapoel Haifa	1–1	3–0
Hapoel Jerusalem	2–1	2–1
Hapoel Petah Tikva	2–1	2–2
Hapoel Tel Aviv	0–0	0–0
Maccabi Bnei Reineh	1–0	1–2
Maccabi Netanya	4–0	3–2
Maccabi Petah Tikva	5–0	2–3
Maccabi Tel Aviv	2–0	1–0

=== Championship round ===
==== Championship round table ====
Pos	Team	Pld	W	D	L	GF	GA	GD	Pts	Qualification	MTA	MHA	HBS	HHA	MBR	BnS
1	Maccabi Tel Aviv (C)	36	26	7	3	75	25	+50	85	Qualification for the Champions League second qualifying round	—	1–1	3–0	4–0	2–0	2–0
2	Maccabi Haifa	36	23	7	6	75	28	+47	74 (Note: Maccabi Haifa had 2 points deducted.)	Qualification for the Conference League second qualifying round	0–1	—	4–1	0–2	1–2	1–0
3	Hapoel Be'er Sheva	36	19	4	13	55	40	+15	61	Qualification for the Conference League second qualifying round	1–0	1–4	—	2–1	2–1	2–1
4	Hapoel Haifa	36	18	5	13	48	47	+1	59		0–3	0–2	2–0	—	2–0	1–2
5	Maccabi Bnei Reineh	36	11	11	14	38	44	−6	44		2–3	1–5	1–0	0–1	—	2–2
6	Bnei Sakhnin	36	10	15	11	39	46	−7	44 (Note: Bnei Sakhnin had 1 point deducted.)		1–1	1–2	4–1	2–1	0–2	—

Source: Soccerway
Legend: Blue = home team win; Yellow = draw; Red = away team win.
Rules for classification: 1) Points; 2) Goal difference; 3) Matches won; 4) Goals scored; 5) Head-to-head points; 6) Head-to-head goal difference; 7) Head-to-head goals scored; 8) Play-off.
(C) Champions

==== Matches ====
31 March 2024 27	Maccabi Haifa	1–2	Maccabi Bnei Reineh	Haifa
20:30	Cornud (yellow card) 27'; Mohamed (yellow card) 34'; Sundgren (yellow card) 45'; Khalaily 80'; Seck (yellow card) 90+6'	Report	5' Koszta; 43' Vargas	Stadium: Sammy Ofer Stadium; Attendance: 24,560; Referee: David Foxman

8 April 2024 28	Maccabi Tel Aviv	1–1	Maccabi Haifa	Tel Aviv
20:30	Zahavi 14'; Nachmias (yellow card) 63'; Malede (yellow card) 78'	Report	(yellow card) 30', (goal) 70' Khalaily; (yellow card) 38' Seck; (yellow card) 61' Refaelov; (yellow card) 63' Mohamed	Stadium: Bloomfield Stadium; Attendance: 26,275; Referee: Snir Levi

13 April 2024 29	Maccabi Haifa	1–0	Bnei Sakhnin	Haifa
17:45	David 1'; Kandil (yellow card) 90+2'	Report	(yellow card) 54' Soteriou; (yellow card) 76' Darwish	Stadium: Sammy Ofer Stadium; Attendance: 26,231; Referee: Roi Reinshreiber

20 April 2024 30	Maccabi Haifa	4–1	Hapoel Be'er Sheva	Haifa
20:00	David 25', 29'; Dadia 63' (o.g.); Cornud (yellow card) 67'; Seck (yellow card) 78'; Podgoreanu 81'	Report	(yellow card) 67' Dadia; 90+2' Oulad Omar	Stadium: Sammy Ofer Stadium; Attendance: 27,457; Referee: Gal Leibovich

29 April 2024 31	Hapoel Haifa	0–2	Maccabi Haifa	Haifa
20:30	Ben Harush (yellow card) 25'; Serdal (yellow card) 25'; Mayembo (yellow card) 34'	Report	(yellow card) 25' Hagag; (yellow card) 32' Sundgren; 72', 74' David	Stadium: Sammy Ofer Stadium; Attendance: 21,284; Referee: Orel Grinfeld

4 May 2024 32	Maccabi Bnei Reineh	1–5	Maccabi Haifa	Nof HaGalil
20:00	Vargas 2'; Usman (yellow card) 46'; Meir (yellow card) 84'; Boshanek (yellow card) 89'	Report	14', 60' David; 12', 72' Pierrot; 67' Refaelov	Stadium: Green Stadium; Referee: Erez Papir

11 May 2024 33	Maccabi Haifa	0-1	Maccabi Tel Aviv	Haifa
20:30	Kinda (yellow card) 71'; Jaber (yellow card) 90+5'; Cornud (yellow card) 90+7'	Report	(yellow card) 23' Peretz; 27' (pen.), (penalty missed) 54' Zahavi; (yellow card) 46' Revivo; (yellow card) 84' Nachmias	Stadium: Sammy Ofer Stadium; Attendance: 29,842; Referee: Roi Reinshreiber

18 May 2024 34	Bnei Sakhnin	1-2	Maccabi Haifa	Sakhnin
20:30	Păun 57' (pen.); Abu Nil (red card) 76'	Report	(yellow card) 56' Kayouf; (yellow card) 66' Refaelov; 78' (pen.) David; 90+4' Pierrot	Stadium: Doha Stadium; Attendance: 2,729; Referee: Idan Leiba

21 May 2024 35	Hapoel Be'er Sheva	1-4	Maccabi Haifa	Be'er Sheva
20:30	Shamir (yellow card) 34'; Omar (yellow card) 40'; Lopes 39' (pen.)	Report	8' Kandil; 28' Pierrot; (yellow card) 31' Cafumana; (yellow card) 38' Feingold; 41' (o.g.) Tibi; 54' David; (yellow card) 60' Saief	Stadium: Turner Stadium; Attendance: 9,675; Referee: Ygal Frid

25 May 2024 36	Maccabi Haifa	0-2	Hapoel Haifa	Haifa
18:30	Cornud (yellow card) 16'; Keouf (red card) 70'; Khalaily (yellow card) 78'; Mohamed (red card) 80'; Gadi Kinda (yellow card) 88'	Report	(yellow card) 22' Sabag; (yellow card) 45' Serdal; Melamed 45+13' (pen.), 48'; (yellow card) 58' Itamar Noy; (yellow card) 78' Antilevsky; (yellow card) 79' Malul; (yellow card) 88' Itay Buganim	Stadium: Sammy Ofer Stadium; Attendance: 25,140; Referee: Nael Odeh

==== Results overview ====
Win Draw Loss

Opposition	Home score	Away score
Bnei Sakhnin	1–0	2–1
Hapoel Be'er Sheva	4–1	4–1
Hapoel Haifa	0–2	2–0
Maccabi Bnei Reineh	1–2	5–1
Maccabi Tel Aviv	0–1	1–1

=== Overall ===
==== Results summary ====
Overall								Home						Away					
Pld	W	D	L	GF	GA	GD	Pts	W	D	L	GF	GA	GD	W	D	L	GF	GA	GD
36	23	7	6	75	28	+47	76	11	4	3	31	11	+20	12	3	3	44	17	+27

Last updated: 26 May 2024.
Source: Competitive matches

==== Results by round ====
Round	1	2	3	4	5	6	7	8	9	10	11	12	13	14	15	16	17	18	19	20	21	22	23	24	25	26	27	28	29	30	31	32	33	34	35	36
Ground	H	A	A	H	A	H	A	H	A	H	A	H	A	A	H	H	A	H	A	H	A	H	A	H	A	H	H	A	H	H	A	A	H	A	A	H
Result	W	W	L	D	W	W	W	D	W	W	W	W	D	D	W	W	W	W	L	W	W	D	W	W	L	D	L	D	W	W	W	W	L	W	W	L
Position	-	5	11	10	6	3	4	4	3	2	2	2	2	2	2	2	2	2	2	1	1	1	1	2	2	2	2	2	2	2	2	2	2	2	2	2

Updated to match(es) played on 26 May 2024. Source: Competitions Matches
A = Away; H = Home; W = Win; D = Draw; L = Loss

== State Cup ==
=== Round of 32 ===
28 January 2024 Round of 32	Hapoel Kfar Saba	3–6 (a.e.t.)	Maccabi Haifa	Kfar Saba
20:30	Maman (yellow card) 15'; Ofek Fishler 66'; Ali El-Khatib 70', (yellow card) 117'; Lior Inbrum 90+2'; Yehoshua Strimling (yellow card) 103'; Sheikh Yosef (yellow card) 107'	Report	5', (yellow card) 73' Kinda; 40' (pen.), 71' Hemed; (yellow card) 65' Saief; 110' Podgoreanu; (yellow card) 117' Sundgren; 119', 120+3' Khalaily	Stadium: Levita Stadium; Referee: Ohad Asulin

=== Round of 16 ===
28 February 2024 Round of 16	Hapoel Umm al-Fahm	0–2	Maccabi Haifa	Umm al-Fahm
20:00		Report	43' Podgoreanu; 84' Pierrot	Stadium: HaShalom Stadium; Referee: Orel Grinfeld

=== Quarter-finals ===
3 April 2024 Quarter-finals	Maccabi Haifa	1–3	Maccabi Netanya	Haifa
20:00	Refaelov 42'	Report	(red card) 49' Balay; (yellow card) 52' Zlatanović; 70' Plakuschenko; 82' Ben Shabat; (yellow card) 90+7' Jaber; 90+9' Shviro	Stadium: Sammy Ofer Stadium; Attendance: 24,340; Referee: Erez Papir

== Israel Super Cup ==
22 July 2023	Maccabi Haifa	3–1	Beitar Jerusalem	Haifa
20:30	Chery 58'; David 84'; Khalaily 90+4'	Report	44' Friday; (yellow card) 48' Ben Bitton; (yellow card) 55' Korsia; (yellow card) 81' Silva; (yellow card) 86' Muzie	Stadium: Sammy Ofer Stadium; Attendance: 27,953; Referee: Igal Frid

As the winner of the Israeli Super Cup, Maccabi Haifa advanced to the semi-finals of the Toto Cup.

== Toto Cup ==
19 August 2023 Semi-finals	Maccabi Petah Tikva	0–2	Maccabi Haifa	Petah Tikva
19:30		Report	74' Khalaily; 81' David	Stadium: HaMoshava Stadium; Attendance: 10,417; Referee: Orel Grinfeld

24 January 2024 Final	Maccabi Tel Aviv	0–0 (4–2 p)	Maccabi Haifa	Netanya
20:00		Report		Stadium: Netanya Stadium; Referee: Aviad Shiloach
	Penalties
	Zahavi (penalty scored); Kartsev (penalty scored); Davida (penalty scored); Peretz (penalty missed); Luckassen (penalty scored)		(penalty missed) Chery; (penalty missed) Pierrot; (penalty scored) Khalaily; (penalty scored) Cornud

== UEFA Champions League ==
=== First qualifying round ===
11 July 2023 1st qualifying round – 1st leg	Ħamrun Spartans (Malta)	0–4	(Israel) Maccabi Haifa	Ta' Qali
21:00 (IDT)	Borg (yellow card) 19'; Đuranović (yellow card) 68'	Report	41', 57' Pierrot; 45+3' David; 70' Khalaily	Stadium: Centenary Stadium; Attendance: 3,000; Referee: Don Robertson (Scotland)

18 July 2023 1st qualifying round – 2nd leg	Maccabi Haifa (Israel)	2–1 (6–1 agg.)	(Malta) Ħamrun Spartans	Haifa
20:00 (IDT)	Shuranov (yellow card) 65', (goal) 69'; Pierrot 84'	Report	21' Mbong; (yellow card) 59' Roko Prša; (yellow card) 65' Marchetti	Stadium: Sammy Ofer Stadium; Attendance: 28,613; Referee: Fran Jovic (Croatia)

=== Second qualifying round ===
26 July 2023 2nd qualifying round – 1st leg	Sheriff Tiraspol (Moldova)	1–0	(Israel) Maccabi Haifa	Tiraspol
20:00 (IDT)	Talal 27'; Mbekeli (yellow card) 50'; Apostolakis (yellow card) 86'	Report	(yellow card) 70' Cornud; (yellow card) 90+3' Sundgren; (yellow card) 90+5' Pierrot	Stadium: Sheriff Stadium; Referee: Sebastian Gishamer (AUT)

2 August 2023 2nd qualifying round – 2nd leg	Maccabi Haifa (Israel)	4–1 (a.e.t.) (4–2 agg.)	(Moldova) Sheriff Tiraspol	Haifa
20:00 (IDT)	Mohamed (yellow card) 18'; Haziza (yellow card) 19'; Chery 33'; Sabi'a (yellow card) 56'; Jaber 85'; Kandil (yellow card) 86'; David 105+2'; Shuranov 108', (yellow card) 119'; Podgoreanu (yellow card) 112'	Report	20' (pen.) (yellow card) 45+10' (red card) 90+4' Talal; (yellow card) 31' Koval; (yellow card) 40' Bordin; (yellow card) 42' (yellow-red card) 86' Luvannor; (yellow card) 45+1' Mbekeli; (yellow card) 119' Zohouri	Stadium: Sammy Ofer Stadium; Attendance: 29,000; Referee: Damian Sylwestrzak (POL)
Note: Amine Talal and Henrique Luvannor were sent off from the bench .

=== Third qualifying round ===
9 August 2023 3rd qualifying round – 1st leg	Slovan Bratislava (Slovakia)	1–2	(Israel) Maccabi Haifa	Bratislava
21:30 (IDT)	Seck 13' (o.g.)	Report	5' Pierrot; 15' Sabi'a; (yellow card) 90' Goldberg; (yellow card) 90+1' Cornud	Stadium: Tehelné pole Attendance: 21,375; Referee: Andris Treimanis (LVA)

15 August 2023 3rd qualifying round – 2nd leg	Maccabi Haifa (Israel)	3–1 (5–2 agg.)	(Slovakia) Slovan Bratislava	Haifa
20:00 (IDT)	Cornud (yellow card) 21'; Mohamed (yellow card) 24'; Pierrot 29', (yellow card) 64'; Sabi'a 45+2'; Goldberg (yellow card) 88'; David 90+3'	Report	(yellow card) 21' Barseghyan; 85', (yellow card) 90+2' Tolić	Stadium: Sammy Ofer Stadium; Attendance: 29,000; Referee: Craig Pawson (ENG)

=== Play-off round ===
23 August 2023 Play-off round – 1st leg	Maccabi Haifa (Israel)	0–0	(Switzerland) Young Boys	Haifa
22:00 (IDT)	Cornud (yellow card) 50'; Chery (yellow card) 63'; Sundgren (yellow card) 71'; Mohamed (yellow card) 74'	Report	(yellow card) 40' Rieder; (yellow card) 45+2' Imeri; (yellow card) 83' Monteiro	Stadium: Sammy Ofer Stadium; Attendance: 29,864; Referee: Davide Massa (ITA)

29 August 2023 Play-off round – 2nd leg	Young Boys (Switzerland)	3–0 (3–0 agg.)	(Israel) Maccabi Haifa	Bern
22:00 (IDT)	Itten 22'; Seck 29' (o.g.); Ugrinic 47'; Janko (yellow card) 75'	Report	(yellow card) 67' Podgoreanu	Stadium: Stadion Wankdorf; Referee: Slavko Vinčić (SVN)

== UEFA Europa League ==
=== Group stage ===
Pos	Team	Pld	W	D	L	GF	GA	GD	Pts	Qualification	VIL	REN	MHA	PAO
1	(Spain) Villarreal	6	4	1	1	9	7	+2	13	Advance to round of 16	—	1–0	0–0	3–2
2	(France) Rennes	6	4	0	2	13	6	+7	12	Advance to knockout round play-offs	2–3	—	3–0	3–1
3	(Israel) Maccabi Haifa	6	1	2	3	3	9	−6	5	Transfer to Europa Conference League	1–2	0–3	—	0–0
4	(Greece) Panathinaikos	6	1	1	4	7	10	−3	4		2–0	1–2	1–2	—

Source: UEFA
Legend: Blue = home team win; Yellow = draw; Red = away team win.
Rules for classification: Group stage tiebreakers

21 September 2023 1	Stade Rennais (France)	3–0	(Israel) Maccabi Haifa	Rennes
18:45 (19:45 IDT)	Blas 1'; Truffert 31'; Yıldırım 55'; Gouiri (yellow card) 79'	Report	(yellow card) 59' Cafumana; (yellow card) 66' Kandil; (yellow card) 79' Chery; (yellow card) 79' Khalaily; (yellow card) 89' Mohamed	Stadium: Roazhon Park; Referee: Harm Osmers (Germany)

5 October 2023 2	Maccabi Haifa (Israel)	0–0	(Greece) Panathinaikos	Haifa
21:00 (22:00 IDT)	Sabia (yellow card) 2'; Cornud (yellow card) 54'; Sundgren (yellow card) 71'	Report	(yellow card) 55' Ioannidis; (yellow card) 60' Đuričić	Stadium: Sammy Ofer Stadium; Attendance: 29,465; Referee: António Nobre (POR)

9 November 2023 4	Maccabi Haifa (Israel)	1–2	(Spain) Villarreal	Larnaca, Cyprus (Note: Maccabi Haifa play their remaining home matches at a neutral venue, due to the Gaza war.)
18:45 (19:45 IDT)	Seck 30'; Šimić (yellow card) 37'; Refaelov (yellow card) 71'; Cafumana (yellow card) 85'	Report	(yellow card) 28', (goal) 86' Sørloth; (yellow card) 69' Altimira; (yellow card) 75' Moreno; 82' Baena; (penalty missed) 38' Trigueros	Stadium: AEK Arena – Georgios Karapatakis; Attendance: 0 (Note: Played Behind closed doors due to the Gaza war); Referee: Mykola Balakin (UKR)

30 November 2023 5	Maccabi Haifa (Israel)	0–3	(France) Stade Rennais	Budapest, Hungary (Note: Maccabi Haifa play their remaining home matches at a neutral venue, due to the Gaza war.)
18:45 (19:45 IDT)	Šimić (yellow card) 16'; Cornud (yellow card) 65'; Kandil (yellow card) 88'	Report	29' Terrier; 47' Gouiri; 90+3' Rieder; (yellow card) 85'Blas	Stadium: Puskás Aréna; Attendance: 0 Referee: Horațiu Feșnic (ROU)

6 December 2023 3	Villarreal (Spain)	0–0	(Israel) Maccabi Haifa	Villarreal
21:00 (22:00 IDT)	Capoue (yellow card) 36'; Foyth (yellow card) 45+1'; Pedraza (yellow card) 62'	Report	(yellow card) 79' Refaelov; (yellow card) 90+2' Naor	Stadium: Estadio de la Cerámica; Attendance: 9,365; Referee: Nick Walsh (SCO)
Note: originally scheduled to be played on 26 October 2023, due to the Gaza war was rescheduled to 6 December 2023.

14 December 2023 6	Panathinaikos (Greece)	1–2	(Israel) Maccabi Haifa	Athens
18:45 (19:45 IDT)	Juankar (yellow card) 10'; Fotis Ioannidis 89'; Bernard (yellow card) 90+7'	Report	20' David; (yellow card) 36' Cornud; (yellow card) 45+3' Sundgren; (yellow card) 46' Pierrot; (yellow card) 60' Hagag; (yellow card) 66' Jaber; 73' Chery	Stadium: Leoforos Alexandras Stadium; Referee: Georgi Kabakov (BUL)

== UEFA Europa Conference League ==
=== Knockout round play-offs ===
15 February 2024 Knockout round play-offs – 1st leg	Maccabi Haifa (Israel)	1–0	(Belgium) Gent	Budapest, Hungary (Note: Maccabi Haifa play their remaining home matches at a neutral venue, due to the Gaza war.)
21:00 (22:00 IDT)	Kandil (yellow card) 57'; Pierrot 65'; Feingold (yellow card) 76'	Report	(yellow card) 90+3' De Sart	Stadium: Bozsik Aréna; Attendance: 1,274; Referee: Willie Collum (SCO)

21 February 2024 Knockout round play-offs – 2nd leg	Gent (Belgium)	1–1 (1–2 agg.)	(Israel) Maccabi Haifa	Ghent, Belgium
18:00 (19:00 IDT)	Seck 69' (o.g.)	Report	4' Pierrot; (yellow card) 11' (yellow-red card) 72' Sundgren; (yellow card) 22' Saief; (yellow card) 78' Podgoreanu	Stadium: Ghelamco Arena; Attendance: 0 (Note: Due anticipated protests and crowd trouble due to the Gaza war, the game was played behind closed doors.); Referee: Matej Jug (SVN)

=== Round of 16 ===
7 March 2024 Round of 16 – 1st leg	Maccabi Haifa (Israel)	3–4	(Italy) Fiorentina	Budapest, Hungary (Note: Maccabi Haifa play their remaining home matches at a neutral venue, due to the Gaza war.)
21:00 (22:00 IDT)	Mohamed (yellow card) 10'; Seck 12'; Kinda 28'; Khalaily 67'; Show (yellow card) 68' (yellow-red card) 80'	Report	2' Nzola; 59' Beltrán; 73' Mandragora; (yellow card) 84' Kayode; (yellow card) 86' Milenković; 90+5' Barák	Stadium: Bozsik Aréna; Attendance: 1,589; Referee: Donatas Rumsas (LTU)

14 March 2024 Round of 16 – 2nd leg	Fiorentina (Italy)	1–1 (5–4 agg.)	(Israel) Maccabi Haifa	Florence, Italy
18:45 (19:45 IDT)	Barák 58'; Belotti (yellow card) 90+5'	Report	(yellow card) 15' Cornud; (yellow card) 87' Šimić; 78' Khalaily	Stadium: Stadio Artemio Franchi; Attendance: 6,838; Referee: Irfan Peljto (BIH)

== Statistics ==
=== Squad statistics ===
				Ligat HaAl		State Cup		Toto Cup		Israel Super Cup		UCL		UEL		UCEL		Total	
Nation	No.	Pos.	Name	App.	Goals.	App.	Goals.	App.	Goals.	App.	Goals.	App.	Goals.	App.	Goals.	App.	Goals.	App.	Goals.
(Sweden)	2	DF	Daniel Sundgren	23	0	2	0	1	0	1	0	8	0	5	0	3	0	43	0
(Israel)	3	DF	Sean Goldberg	26	3	1	0	1	0	2	0	7	0	1	0	1	0	39	3
(Niger)	4	MF	Ali Mohamed	32	0	1	0	0	0	1	0	8	0	5	0	4	0	51	0
(Angola)	5	MF	Manuel Cafumana	20	0	1	0	1	0	0	0	0	0	6	0	3	0	31	0
(Israel)	6	MF	Gadi Kinda	20	2	3	1	0	0	0	0	0	0	0	0	4	1	27	4
(Israel)	8	MF	Dolev Haziza	4	0	0	0	0	0	1	0	7	0	0	0	0	0	12	0
(Haiti)	9	FW	Frantzdy Pierrot	29	18	2	1	1	0	1	0	8	5	6	0	4	2	51	26
(Israel)	11	MF	Lior Refaelov	34	8	1	1	1	0	1	0	8	0	5	0	3	0	53	9
(Israel)	14	MF	Lior Kasa	7	0	3	0	1	0	0	0	0	0	0	0	0	0	11	0
(United States)	15	MF	Kenny Saief	20	0	3	0	1	0	0	0	0	0	0	0	3	0	27	0
(Israel)	17	FW	Suf Podgoreanu	18	1	3	2	2	0	0	0	3	0	4	0	4	0	34	3
(Israel)	18	MF	Goni Naor	16	1	2	0	2	0	1	0	4	0	3	0	4	0	32	1
(Germany)	19	FW	Erik Shuranov	4	0	0	0	1	0	0	0	4	2	2	0	0	0	11	2
(Israel)	21	FW	Dean David	28	20	2	0	2	1	1	1	7	3	6	1	0	0	46	26
(Israel)	22	DF	Ilay Feingold	21	0	3	0	1	0	0	0	0	0	2	0	4	0	31	0
(Israel)	23	DF	Maor Kandil	25	1	2	0	1	0	0	0	3	0	3	0	3	0	36	1
(Israel)	25	FW	Anan Khalaily	31	8	3	2	2	1	1	1	6	1	6	0	3	2	52	15
(Israel)	26	MF	Mahmoud Jaber	25	0	1	0	1	0	1	0	8	1	6	0	0	0	42	1
(France)	27	DF	Pierre Cornud	32	1	2	0	1	0	1	0	6	0	5	0	3	0	50	1
(Israel)	28	MF	Ilay Hagag	16	3	0	0	1	0	0	0	2	0	4	0	0	0	22	3
(Israel)	29	FW	Tomer Hemed	10	1	2	2	0	0	0	0	0	0	0	0	0	0	12	3
(Senegal)	30	DF	Abdoulaye Seck	26	2	0	0	0	0	1	0	8	0	5	1	4	1	46	3
(Russia)	31	MF	Daniil Lesovoy	5	0	2	0	0	0	0	0	0	0	0	0	2	0	9	0
(Israel)	32	MF	Ziv Ben Shimol	3	0	1	0	0	0	0	0	0	0	0	0	0	0	4	0
(Israel)	37	MF	Yarin Levi	0	0	0	0	1	0	0	0	0	0	0	0	0	0	1	0
(Israel)	40	GK	Shareef Kayouf	34	0	2	0	2	0	0	0	0	0	5	0	4	0	46	0
(Croatia)	44	DF	Lorenco Šimić	23	1	2	0	1	0	0	0	1	0	5	0	4	0	36	1
(Israel)	55	DF	Rami Gershon	5	0	2	0	1	0	0	0	0	0	3	0	2	0	13	0
(Israel)	77	GK	Roee Fucs	1	0	0	0	0	0	0	0	0	0	0	0	0	0	1	0
(Israel)		DF	Ori Dahan †	0	0	0	1	0	0	0	0	1	0	0	0	0	0	2	0
(Israel)		DF	Roey Elimelech †	0	0	0	0	1	0	0	0	0	0	0	0	0	0	1	0
(Suriname)	10	MF	Tjaronn Chery †	17	2	0	0	1	0	1	1	7	1	4	1	0	0	30	5
(Israel)	12	DF	Sun Menahem †	0	0	0	0	0	0	0	0	0	0	0	0	0	0	0	0
(Israel)	16	GK	Itamar Nitzan †	2	0	1	0	0	0	1	0	8	0	1	0	0	0	13	0
(Israel)	34	MF	Hamza Shibli †	6	0	0	0	1	0	0	0	2	0	3	0	0	0	12	0
(Israel)	91	MF	Dia Sabia †	3	2	0	0	0	0	1	0	8	2	2	0	0	0	14	4

^{†} Player left Maccabi Haifa during the season.

=== Goals ===
Rank	Player	Position	Ligat HaAl	State Cup	Toto Cup	Super Cup	UCL	UEL	UCEL	Total
1-2	(Israel) Dean David	FW	20	0	1	1	3	1	0	26
1-2	(Haiti) Frantzdy Pierrot	FW	18	1	0	0	5	0	2	26
3	(Israel) Anan Khalaily	FW	8	2	1	1	1	0	2	15
4	(Israel) Lior Refaelov	MF	8	1	0	0	0	0	0	9
5	(Suriname) Tjaronn Chery †	MF	2	0	0	1	1	1	0	5
6-7	(Israel) Gadi Kinda	MF	2	1	0	0	0	0	1	4
6-7	(Israel) Dia Sabia †	MF	2	0	0	0	2	0	0	4
8-12	(Israel) Ilay Hagag	MF	3	0	0	0	0	0	0	3
8-12	(Israel) Sean Goldberg	DF	3	0	0	0	0	0	0	3
8-12	(Israel) Tomer Hemed	FW	1	2	0	0	0	0	0	3
8-12	(Senegal) Abdoulaye Seck	DF	1	0	0	0	0	1	1	3
8-12	(Israel) Suf Podgoreanu	FW	1	2	0	0	1	0	0	3
13	(Germany) Erik Shuranov	FW	0	0	0	0	2	0	0	2
14-15	(Croatia) Lorenco Šimić	DF	1	0	0	0	0	0	0	1
14-15	(Israel) Goni Naor	MF	1	0	0	0	0	0	0	1
14-15	(Israel) Mahmoud Jaber	MF	0	0	0	0	1	0	0	1
14-15	(France) Pierre Cornud	DF	1	0	0	0	0	0	0	1
14-15	(Israel) Maor Kandil	DF	1	0	0	0	0	0	0	1

^{†} Player left Maccabi Haifa during the season.

=== Assist ===
Rank	Player	Position	Ligat HaAl	State Cup	Toto Cup	Super Cup	UCL	UEL	UCEL	Total
1-2	(Suriname) Tjaronn Chery †	FW	5	0	0	0	4	0	0	9
1-2	(Israel) Lior Refaelov	MF	7	0	1	0	0	1	0	9
3	(Haiti) Frantzdy Pierrot	FW	6	0	0	0	2	0	0	8
4	(Israel) Anan Khalaily	FW	5	0	1	0	0	0	1	7
5-6	(Israel) Gadi Kinda	MF	4	1	0	0	0	0	0	5
5-6	(France) Pierre Cornud	DF	3	0	0	0	0	2	0	5
7-9	(Israel) Suf Podgoreanu	FW	1	1	0	0	1	0	1	4
7-9	(United States) Kenny Saief	MF	1	3	0	0	0	0	0	4
7-9	(Israel) Ilay Hagag	MF	4	0	0	0	0	0	0	4
10-13	(Israel) Maor Kandil	DF	1	1	0	0	1	0	0	3
10-13	(Israel) Dean David	FW	1	1	0	0	1	0	0	3
10-13	(Israel) Sean Goldberg	DF	2	0	0	0	0	0	1	3
10-13	(Israel) Mahmoud Jaber	MF	3	0	0	0	0	0	0	3
14-17	(Israel) Dolev Haziza	MF	0	0	0	0	2	0	0	2
14-17	(Croatia) Lorenco Šimić	DF	1	0	0	0	0	0	1	2
14-17	(Niger) Ali Mohamed	MF	0	0	0	0	1	0	1	2
14-17	(Israel) Dia Sabia †	MF	1	0	0	0	1	0	0	2
18-21	(Israel) Ilay Feingold	DF	1	0	0	0	0	0	0	1
18-21	(Israel) Ziv Ben Shimol	MF	0	1	0	0	0	0	0	1
18-21	(Senegal) Abdoulaye Seck	DF	1	0	0	0	0	0	0	1
18-21	(Israel) Shareef Keouf	GK	1	0	0	0	0	0	0	1

^{†} Player left Maccabi Haifa during the season.

=== Clean sheets ===
Rank	Pos.	No.	Name	Ligat HaAl	State Cup	Toto Cup	Super Cup	UCL	UEL	UCEL	Total
1	GK	40	(Israel) Shareef Kayouf	15	1	1			2	1	20
2	GK	16	(Israel) Itamar Nitzan					2			2
3	GK	77	(Israel) Roee Fucs	1							1

=== Disciplinary record for Ligat Ha'Al and State Cup ===
No.	Pos	Nat	Name	Ligat Ha'Al			State Cup			Total		
No.	Pos	Nat	Name	Yellow card	(yellow card) (yellow-red card)	Red card	Yellow card	(yellow card) (yellow-red card)	Red card	Yellow card	(yellow card) (yellow-red card)	Red card
27	DF	(France)	Pierre Cornud	11						11		
11	MF	(Israel)	Lior Refaelov	9						9		
2	DF	(Sweden)	Daniel Sundgren	7			1			8		
30	DF	(Senegal)	Abdoulaye Seck	6						6		
4	MF	(Niger)	Ali Mohamed	5		1				5		1
15	MF	(United States)	Kenny Saief	5						5		
26	MF	(Israel)	Mahmoud Jaber	5						5		
6	MF	(Israel)	Gadi Kinda	4			1			5		
25	FW	(Israel)	Anan Khalaily	4						4		
9	FW	(Haiti)	Frantzdy Pierrot	4	1					4	1	
10	MF	(Suriname)	Tjaronn Chery †	3						3		
40	GK	(Israel)	Shareef Keouf	3		1				3		1
22	DF	(Israel)	Ilay Feingold	3						3		
5	MF	(Angola)	Manuel Cafumana	3						3		
18	MF	(Israel)	Goni Naor	2						2		
17	FW	(Israel)	Suf Podgoreanu	1			1			2		
23	DF	(Israel)	Maor Kandil	2						2		
3	DF	(Israel)	Sean Goldberg	1						1		
16	GK	(Israel)	Itamar Nitzan †	1						1		
91	MF	(Israel)	Dia Sabia	1						1		
34	MF	(Israel)	Hamza Shibli †	1						1		
21	FW	(Israel)	Dean David	1						1		
29	FW	(Israel)	Tomer Hemed	1						1		
28	MF	(Israel)	Ilay Hagag	1						1		

^{†} Player left Maccabi Haifa during the season.

=== Suspensions ===
Player	Date Received	Offence	Length of suspension		
(France) Pierre Cornud	14 December 2023	(yellow card) 36' vs Panathinaikos (A)	1 Matches	Gent (H)	15 February 2024
(Israel) Lior Refaelov	14 January 2024	(yellow card) 33' vs Maccabi Petah Tikva (H)	1 Matches	Bnei Sakhnin (A)	17 January 2024
(Haiti) Frantzdy Pierrot	31 January 2024	(yellow card) 22' (yellow-red card) 23' vs Hapoel Be'er Sheva (A)	1 Matches	Maccabi Tel Aviv (H)	5 February 2024
(Israel) Maor Kandil	15 February 2024	(yellow card) 57' vs Gent (H)	1 Matches	Gent (A)	21 February 2024
(Sweden) Daniel Sundgren	18 February 2024	(yellow card) 53' vs Hapoel Haifa (H)	1 Matches	F.C. Ashdod (A)	25 February 2024
(Sweden) Daniel Sundgren	21 February 2024	(yellow card) 11' (yellow-red card) 72' vs Gent (A)	1 Matches	Fiorentina (H)	7 March 2024
(France) Pierre Cornud	25 February 2024	(yellow card) 52' vs F.C. Ashdod (A)	1 Matches	Hapoel Umm al-Fahm (A)	28 February 2024
(Angola) Show	7 March 2024	(yellow card) 68' (yellow-red card) 80' vs Fiorentina (H)	1 Matches	Fiorentina (A)	14 March 2024
(Niger) Ali Mohamed	31 March 2024	(yellow card) 34' vs Maccabi Bnei Reineh (H)	1 Matches	Maccabi Netanya (H)	3 April 2024
(Senegal) Abdoulaye Seck	8 April 2024	(yellow card) 38' vs Maccabi Tel Aviv (A)	1 Matches	Bnei Sakhnin (H)	13 April 2024
(France) Pierre Cornud	20 April 2024	(yellow card) 76' vs Hapoel Be'er Sheva (H)	1 Matches	Hapoel Haifa (A)	29 April 2024
(Israel) Mahmoud Jaber	11 May 2024	(yellow card) 90+5' vs Maccabi Tel Aviv (H)	1 Matches	Bnei Sakhnin (A)	18 May 2024
(Israel) Lior Refaelov	18 May 2024	(yellow card) 66' vs Bnei Sakhnin (A)	1 Matches	Hapoel Be'er Sheva (A)	21 May 2024
(United States) Kenny Saief	21 May 2024	(yellow card) 69' vs Hapoel Be'er Sheva (A)	1 Matches	Hapoel Haifa (H)	25 May 2024

=== Penalties ===
Date	Penalty Taker	Scored	Opponent	Competition
1 October 2023	(Suriname) Tjaronn Chery	Yes	Maccabi Netanya	Ligat Ha`Al
25 December 2023	(Haiti) Frantzdy Pierrot	Yes	Hapoel Hadera	Ligat Ha`Al
28 January 2024	(Israel) Tomer Hemed	Yes	Hapoel Kfar Saba	State Cup
18 February 2024	(Israel) Lior Refaelov	No	Hapoel Haifa	Ligat Ha`Al
10 March 2024	(Israel) Anan Khalaily	Yes	Maccabi Bnei Reineh	Ligat Ha`Al
18 May 2024	(Israel) Dean David	Yes	Bnei Sakhnin	Ligat Ha`Al

=== Overall ===
	Total	Home	Away	Natural
Games played	60	29	30	1
Games won	34	17	17	0
Games drawn	13	6	6	1
Games lost	13	6	7	0
Biggest win	5–0 vs Maccabi Petah Tikva; 5–0 vs F.C. Ashdod	5–0 vs Maccabi Petah Tikva	5–0 vs F.C. Ashdod	
Biggest loss	0–3 vs Young Boys; 0–3 vs Stade Rennais	0–3 vs Stade Rennais	0–3 vs Young Boys; 0–3 vs Stade Rennais	
Biggest win (League)	5–0 vs Maccabi Petah Tikva; 5–0 vs F.C. Ashdod	5–0 vs Maccabi Petah Tikva	5–0 vs F.C. Ashdod	—
Biggest loss (League)	2–3 vs Maccabi Petah Tikva; 1–2 vs Hapoel Be'er Sheva; 1–2 vs Maccabi Bnei Reineh (twice); 0-1 vs Maccabi Tel Aviv	1–2 vs Maccabi Bnei Reineh; 0-1 vs Maccabi Tel Aviv	2–3 vs Maccabi Petah Tikva; 1–2 vs Hapoel Be'er Sheva; 1–2 vs Maccabi Bnei Reineh	—
Biggest win (Cup)	6–3 vs Hapoel Kfar Saba		6–3 vs Hapoel Kfar Saba	
Biggest loss (Cup)	1–3 vs Maccabi Netanya	1–3 vs Maccabi Netanya		
Biggest win (Toto)	2–0 vs Maccabi Petah Tikva	—	2–0 vs Maccabi Petah Tikva	—
Biggest loss (Toto)	—	—	—	—
Biggest win (Europe)	4–0 vs Ħamrun Spartans	4–1 vs Sheriff Tiraspol	4–0 vs Ħamrun Spartans	
Biggest loss (Europe)	0–3 vs Young Boys; 0–3 vs Stade Rennais (twice)	0–3 vs Stade Rennais	0–3 vs Young Boys; 0–3 vs Stade Rennais	
Goals scored	113	51	62	0
Goals conceded	58	26	32	0
Goal difference	+55	+25	+30	0
Average GF per game	1.88	1.76	2.07	0
Average GA per game	0.97	0.97	0.97	0
Clean sheets	23	12	10	1
Yellow cards	137	73	63	1
Red cards	5	3	2	
Most appearances	(Israel) Lior Refaelov (53)			
Most goals	(Haiti) Frantzdy Pierrot (Israel) Dean David (26)			
Most Assist	(Suriname) Tjaronn Chery (Israel) Lior Refaelov (9)			
Penalties for	6	1	5	
Penalties scored	5	0	5	
Penalties against	9	7	2	
Penalties saved	2	2	0	
