= Mahmoud Jaber =

Israeli footballer

Personal information
- Date of birth: 5 October 1999 (age 27)
- Place of birth: Tayibe, Israel
- Height: 1.82 m (6 ft 0 in)
- Position: Defensive midfielder

Team information
- Current team: Saint-Étienne
- Number: 5

Youth career
- 2009-2012: Hapoel Kfar Saba
- 2012–2018: Maccabi Haifa

Senior career*
Years	Team	Apps	(Gls)
2018–2025	Maccabi Haifa	118	(6)
2019–2021	→ Hapoel Nof HaGalil (loan)	70	(5)
2025–	Saint-Étienne	19	(1)

International career^{‡}
2022–	Israel	13	(0)
- * Club domestic league appearances and goals as of 11 May 2026 ‡ National team caps and goals as of 6 June 2025

Mahmoud Jaber (Arabic: محمود جابر; born 5 October 1999) is an Israeli professional footballer who plays as a defensive midfielder for Ligue 2 club Saint-Étienne and the Israel national team.

== Early life ==
Jaber was born in Tayibe, Israel, to an Arab-Muslim family. His grandfather Abdullah Jaber and his father Nabil Jaber were renowned local footballers in his hometown. His older brother Abdallah Jaber is also a professional footballer who played for as well as captained the Palestine national team.

== Club career ==
Jaber is a youth product of the academy of Hapoel Kfar Saba, before moving to Maccabi Haifa's youth academy at the age of 12.

He made his senior career on loan with Hapoel Nof HaGalil with a debut on 5 August 2019 in a game against Maccabi Ahi Nazareth in a Toto cup match of the 2019–20 season. In his second year on loan, he helped Hapoel Nof HaGalil win the 2020–21 Toto Cup Leumit and the 2021–22 Liga Leumit earning promotion into the Israel Premier League. He returned to Maccabi Haifa on 15 August 2021, signing an extension keeping him at the club until 2024. There, he helped them win the 2021–22 Israeli Premier League, 2021–22 Toto Cup Al and 2021 Israel Super Cup in his debut season.

On 16 May 2023, he won his first senior title, as winning the Israeli Premier League championship.

Jaber has played in the UEFA Champions League, scoring a goal after coming on at halftime to equalize against Sheriff Tiraspol in the 85th minute of Maccabi Haifa's 4–2 victory in the 2nd round.

== International career ==
Jaber was first called up to the senior Israel national team ahead of the 2022–23 UEFA Nations League matches in June 2022. He debuted with Israel in a 2–2 UEFA Nations League home draw against Iceland on 2 June 2022.

== Career statistics ==
=== Club ===
As of 16 August 2025

Appearances and goals by club, season and competition
Club	Season	League			National cup		League cup		Other		Continental		Total	
Club	Season	Division	Apps	Goals	Apps	Goals	Apps	Goals	Apps	Goals	Apps	Goals	Apps	Goals
Hapoel Nof HaGalil (loan)	2019–20	Liga Leumit	27	1	2	1	3	0	0	0	0	0	32	2
Hapoel Nof HaGalil (loan)	2020–21	Liga Leumit	35	2	2	0	1	0	0	0	0	0	38	3
Maccabi Haifa	2021–22	Israeli Premier League	21	3	4	0	2	1	0	0	0	0	27	4
Maccabi Haifa	2022–23	Israeli Premier League	15	0	1	0	1	0	0	0	0	0	17	0
Maccabi Haifa	2023–24	Israeli Premier League	25	0	1	0	0	0	1	0	14	1	41	1
Maccabi Haifa	2024–25	Israeli Premier League	31	0	1	0	0	0	0	0	2	0	33	1
Saint-Étienne	2025–26	Ligue 2	1	1	0	0	-		-		-		1	1
Career total			155	7	11	1	7	1	1	0	16	1	189	12

=== International ===
As of 10 June 2025

National team	Year	Apps	Goals
Israel	2022	3	0
Israel	2023	1	0
Israel	2024	6	0
Israel	2025	3	0
Total		13	0

== Honours ==
Hapoel Nof HaGalil

- Liga Leumit: 2021–22
- Toto Cup Leumit: 2020–21

Maccabi Haifa

- Israeli Premier League: 2021–22, 2022–23
- Toto Cup Al: 2021–22
- Israel Super Cup: 2021, 2023
