= 2023 Israel Super Cup =

Football match in Haifa, Israel

Maccabi Haifa	Beitar Jerusalem
3	1
- Date: 22 July 2023
- Venue: Sammy Ofer Stadium, Haifa
- Referee: Yigal Frid
- Attendance: 27,953

The 2023 Israel Super Cup was the 28th edition of the Israel Super Cup (33rd, including unofficial matches (Note: The competition wasn't played within the Israel Football Association for its first 5 editions, until 1969.)), an annual Israeli football match played between the winners of the previous season's Israeli Premier League (Maccabi Haifa) and the Israel State Cup (Beitar Jerusalem). This will be the eighth edition since the Super cup's resumption in 2015.

== Match details ==
22 July 2023
20:30

Maccabi Haifa	3–1	Beitar Jerusalem
Chery 58'; David 84'; Khalaily 90+4'		45' Friday; (yellow card) 48' Ben Bitton; (yellow card) 55' Korsia; (yellow card) 81' Silva; (yellow card) 86' Muzie

Sammy Ofer Stadium, Haifa
Attendance: 27,953
Referee: Yigal Frid

Maccabi Haifa	Beitar Jerusalem

GK	16	(Israel) Itamar Nitzan
CB	2	(Sweden) Daniel Sundgren
CB	30	(Senegal) Abdoulaye Seck
CB	3	(Israel) Sean Goldberg
RW	8	(Israel) Dolev Haziza (substituted off) 63'
DM	26	(Israel) Mahmoud Jaber (substituted off) 46'
DM	4	(Niger) Ali Mohamed
LM	27	(France) Pierre Cornud
MF	10	(Suriname) Tjaronn Chery (c) 58'
CF	9	(Israel) Frantzdy Pierrot (substituted off) 90+2'
CF	91	(Israel) Dia Saba (substituted off) 82'
Substitutes:
GK	40	(Israel) Shareef Kayouf
DF	11	(Israel) Lior Refaelov (substituted on) 46'
MF	14	(Israel) Aviel Zargari
MF	18	(Israel) Goni Naor
FW	19	(Germany) Erik Shuranov
DF	21	(Israel) Dean David (substituted on) 82' (goal) 84'
DF	23	(Israel) Maor Kandil (substituted on) 90+2'
FW	25	(Israel) Anan Khalaily (substituted on) 63' (goal) 90+4'
DF	55	(Israel) Rami Gershon
Manager:
(Israel) Messay Dego

GK	55	(Portugal) Miguel Silva (yellow card) 81'
CB	27	(Israel) Omer Korsia (yellow card) 55'
CB	24	(Israel) Ofir Kriaf (c)
CB	4	(Israel) Orel Dgani
LM	18	(Russia) Grigori Morozov
CM	8	(Israel) Dan Azaria
CM	11	(Israel) Yuval Ashkenazi (substituted off) 61'
RM	2	(Israel) Ben Bitton (yellow card) 48' (substituted off) 70'
RW	15	(Israel) Dor Micha (substituted off) 76'
LW	7	(Israel) Yarden Shua (substituted off) 70'
CF	9	(Nigeria) Fred Friday 45' (substituted off) 70'
Substitutes:
GK	33	(Israel) Roy Sason
MF	10	(Israel) Gidi Kanyuk
MF	12	(Israel) Nehoray Dabush
MF	19	(Israel) Li On Mizrahi (substituted on) 70'
MF	21	(Israel) Adi Yona (substituted on) 61'
MF	24	(Israel) Timothy Muzie (substituted on) 76' (yellow card) 85'
DF	34	(Israel) Liel Deri
FW	98	(Moldova) Ion Nicolaescu (substituted on) 70'
FW	80	(Ivory Coast) Trazié Thomas (substituted on) 70'
Manager:
(Israel) Yossi Abukasis

Man of the Match:

MATCH OFFICIALS
Assistant referees:
Dudu Biton
Mati Yacobov
Fourth official:
Nael Odeh
Video assistant referee:
Ziv Adler
Assistant video assistant referee:
Nati Dotan

Match rules

- 90 minutes
- Nine named substitutes, of which up to five may be used
