= Korsia =

Korsia may refer to:

- Haïm Korsia (born 1963), French rabbi
- Korsia (island), island in the Greek Aegean Sea
- Omer Korsia (born 2002), Israeli footballer
