= 2023 Israel State Cup final =

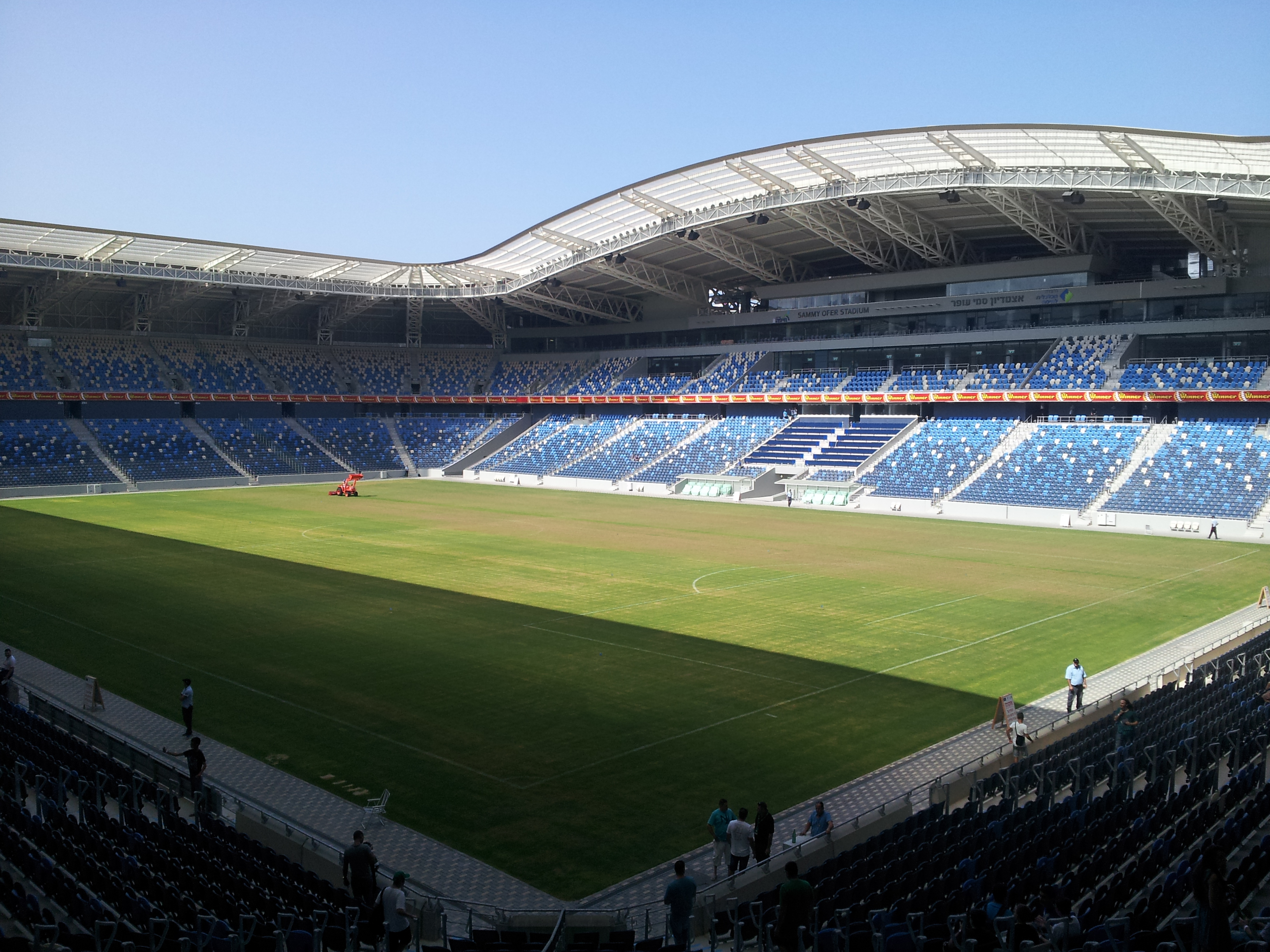
- Sammy Ofer Stadium in Haifa hosted the final
- Event: 2022–23 Israel State Cup
Beitar Jerusalem	Maccabi Netanya
3	0
- Date: 23 May 2023
- Venue: Sammy Ofer, Haifa

The 2023 Israel State Cup final decided the winner of the 2022–23 Israel State Cup, the 87th season of Israel's main football cup. It was played on 23 May 2023 at the Sammy Ofer Stadium in Haifa, between Maccabi Netanya and Beitar Jerusalem.

== Background ==
Maccabi Netanya had previously played 5 Israel cup Finals, had won the competition a record 1 time. Their most recent appearance in the final was in 2019, in which they lost 1–0 to Bnei Yehuda, and their most recent victory in the tournament was in 1978, beating Bnei Yehuda 2–1.

Beitat Jerusalem had previously played in 11 finals, winning 7. Their most recent appearance in the final was in 2018, in which they lost 3–1 to Hapoel Haifa. and their most recent victory in the tournament was in 2009, beating Maccabi Haifa 2–1.

=== Details ===
23 May 2023
CEST

Beitar Jerusalem	3–0	Maccabi Netanua
Ion Nicolaescu 37'; Fred Friday 76'; Yarden Shua 90+5' (pen.)

Sammy Ofer Stadium, Haifa
Referee: Gal Leibovich

Beitat Jerusalem	Maccabi Netanya

GK	55	(Portugal) Miguel Silva
RB	2	(Russia) Grigori Morozov
CB	20	(Israel) Uri Dahan
CB	4	(Israel) Orel Dgani
LB	18	(Israel) Avishay Cohen
RM	80	(Ivory Coast) Trazié Thomas (substituted off) 90+6'
CM	24	(Israel) Ofir Kriaf (c) (yellow card) 90+3'
LM	8	(Israel) Dan Azaria (substituted off) 60'
RW	7	(Israel) Yarden Shua (substituted off) 90+6'
CF	98	(Moldova) Ion Nicolaescu (substituted off) 63'
LF	70	(Colombia) Danilo Asprilla (substituted off) 90+6'
Substitutes:
GK	1	(Israel) Netanel Daloya
DF	5	(Israel) Or Zahavi
DF	27	(Israel) Li On Mizrahi (substituted on) 90+6'
DF	28	(Israel) Amit Cohen
DF	44	(Russia) Sergei Borodin (substituted on) 90+6'
MF	10	(Israel) Bar Cohen (substituted on) 90+6'
MF	21	(Israel) Adi Yona (substituted on) 60'
FW	9	(Nigeria) Fred Friday (substituted on) 63'
FW	12	(Israel) Nehoray Dabush
Manager:
(Israel) Yossi Abuksis

GK	1	(Israel) Itamar Nitzan
RB	2	(Israel) Ido Vaier
CB	4	(Israel) Raz Shlomo
CB	25	(Bulgaria) Plamen Galabov (yellow card) 45+3' (substituted off) 63'
LB	42	(France) Nassim Ouammou (substituted off) 76'
RM	15	(Israel) Aviv Avraham (c) (substituted off) 76'
CM	8	(Cameroon) Boris Enow (yellow card) 90+4'
LM	99	(Israel) Eitan Azulay (substituted off) 63'
RW	9	(Israel) Oz Bilu (substituted off) 63'
LW	17	(Ghana) Patrick Twumasi
CF	22	(Ukraine) Stanislav Bilenkyi
Substitutes:
GK	13	(Israel) Raz Karmi
DF	7	(Israel) Shay Konstantini (substituted on) 76' (yellow card) 79'
DF	12	(Israel) Yuval Sadeh (substituted on) 63'
DF	26	(Israel) Karem Jaber
MF	6	(Israel) Omri Gandelman (substituted on) 63'
DF	16	(Israel) Naftali Balay
MF	36	(Israel) Omer Eliyahu
FW	11	(Serbia) Igor Zlatanović (substituted on) 63'
FW	54	(Israel) Liran Rotman (substituted on) 76'
Manager:
(Israel) Ran Kojok
