= Hamza Shibli =

Israeli footballer (born 2004)

Personal information
- Full name: Hamza Shibli
- Date of birth: 19 August 2004 (age 22)
- Place of birth: Shibli–Umm al-Ghanam, Israel
- Height: 1.67 m (5 ft 5 1/2 in)
- Position: Left winger

Team information
- Current team: Maccabi Akhi Nazareth

Youth career
- 2013–2014: S.C. Kfar Kama
- 2014–2023: Maccabi Haifa

Senior career*
Years	Team	Apps	(Gls)
2023–	Maccabi Haifa	6	(0)
2024	→ Hapoel Petah Tikva (loan)	13	(1)
2024–2025	→ Ironi Kiryat Shmona (loan)	11	(0)
2025	→ Maccabi Bnei Reineh (loan)	6	(0)
2025–2026	→ Bnei Yehuda Tel Aviv (loan)	17	(0)
2026–	→ Hapoel Kfar Saba (loan)	15	(1)

International career^{‡}
2023	Israel U19	4	(0)
2023	Israel U20	5	(1)
2023	Israel U21	1	(0)
Medal record
Men's football
Representing Israel
FIFA U-20 World Cup
Third place	2023 Argentina	Team
- * Club domestic league appearances and goals as of 24 June 2026 ‡ National team caps and goals as of 4 June 2023

Hamza Shibli (Arabic: حمزة شيبلي, Hebrew: חמזה שיבלי; born 19 August 2004) is an Israeli professional footballer who plays as a left winger for Israeli Liga Leumit club Maccabi Akhi Nazareth, on loan from Maccabi Haifa.

== Early life ==
Shibli was born in Shibli–Umm al-Ghanam, Israel, to a Muslim-Arab Bedouin family. His younger brother Jad Shibli is a fellow footballer of his, who plays for the youth squad of Israeli club Maccabi Haifa. His hometown, the Bedouin village of Shibli-Umm al-Ghannam, is adjacent to Mount Tabor in northern Israel.

== Club career ==
He started to play for the Israeli club Maccabi Haifa's children team, when he was 10 years old.

On 11 July 2023 made his debut in the senior team in the 4–0 win against Ħamrun Spartans in UEFA Champions League qualifying.

On 28 January 2024 loaned to Hapoel Petah Tikva until the end of the season.

On 20 August 2024 loaned to Ironi Kiryat Shmona.

== International career ==
He debuted for the Israel national under-19 team in a friendly match against Greece U19 on 28 February 2023.

He is also a member of the Israel national under-20 team, that currently participates in the 2023 FIFA U-20 World Cup. Shibli scored a goal against Brazil national under-19 team to even the score in the world cup in a match that team Israel eventually won 3–2 to advance to the semifinals. Shibli assisted on the first goal of the game against South Korea in the consolation third place game in the final match of the under 20 World Cup.

== Career statistics ==
=== Club ===
As of 04 June 2024

Appearances and goals by club, season and competition
Club	Season	Division	League		National cup		League Cup		Other		Continental		Total	
Club	Season	Division	Apps	Goals	Apps	Goals	Apps	Goals	Apps	Goals	Apps	Goals	Apps	Goals
Maccabi Haifa	2023–24	Israeli Premier League	6	0	0	0	1	0	0	0	4	0	11	0
Hapoel Petah Tikva	2023–24	Israeli Premier League	13	1	1	0	0	0	0	0	0	0	14	1
Ironi Kiryat Shmona	2024–25	Israeli Premier League	11	0	1	0	0	0	0	0	0	0	12	0
Macacbi Bnei Reineh	2024–25	Israeli Premier League	6	0	0	0	0	0	0	0	0	0	6	0
Bnei Yehuda	2025–26	Liga Leumit	0	0	0	0	0	0	0	0	0	0	10	0
Career total			36	1	2	0	1	0	0	0	4	0	43	1

=== International ===
Appearances and goals by national team and year
National team	Year	Apps	Goals
Israel U19	2022	4	0
Israel U20	2023	5	1
Total		9	1

== Honours ==
Maccabi Haifa

- Israel Super Cup: 2023
