= Yigal Frid =

Israeli football referee (born 1992)

- Born: 28 February 1992 (age 34); Israel
- Other occupation: Computer scientist

Domestic
Years	League	Role
2015–present	Israeli Premier League	Referee

International
Years	League	Role
2018–present	FIFA listed	Referee

Yigal Frid (Hebrew: יגאל פריד; born 28 February 1992) is an Israeli football referee who has been on the FIFA International Referees List since 2018.

== Career ==
Frid was born in February 1992 in Israel, the son of Leonid, a mechanical engineer, and Tanya, a food engineer, who had moved to Israel from the Soviet Union one year earlier just after the collapse of the USSR. Before deciding to pursue a career as a referee, Frid played football for the youth team of Hapoel Kfar Saba F.C. At the age of 16, he quit playing and became focused on being a referee.

Frid refereed his first match in the Israeli Premier League in 2015 in the game between Maccabi Netanya F.C. and Bnei Sakhnin F.C. In July 2018, he debuted in European leagues at a qualifying match of the UEFA Europa League between Lech Poznań and FC Gandzasar Kapan. Other prominent continental and national games for Frid were the 2021 Trophée des Champions between Lille OSC and Paris Saint-Germain FC at Bloomfield Stadium in Tel Aviv and the 2023 Israel Super Cup between Maccabi Haifa F.C. and Beitar Jerusalem F.C.

In March 2021, Frid oversaw his first international match in the FIFA World Cup qualifiers between Northern Ireland and Bulgaria in Belfast. Another game he led in the same qualification tournament was a match between Bosnia and Herzegovina and Kazakhstan. In the qualifiers for the 2026 FIFA World Cup, Frid has refereed several matches, including a 10–0 victory of Austria over San Marino at the Ernst-Happel-Stadion in Vienna.

Frid has a bachelor's degree in computer science and has two children, a girl and a boy, with his wife Shir, who works as an economist.
