= Daniel Sundgren =

Swedish footballer

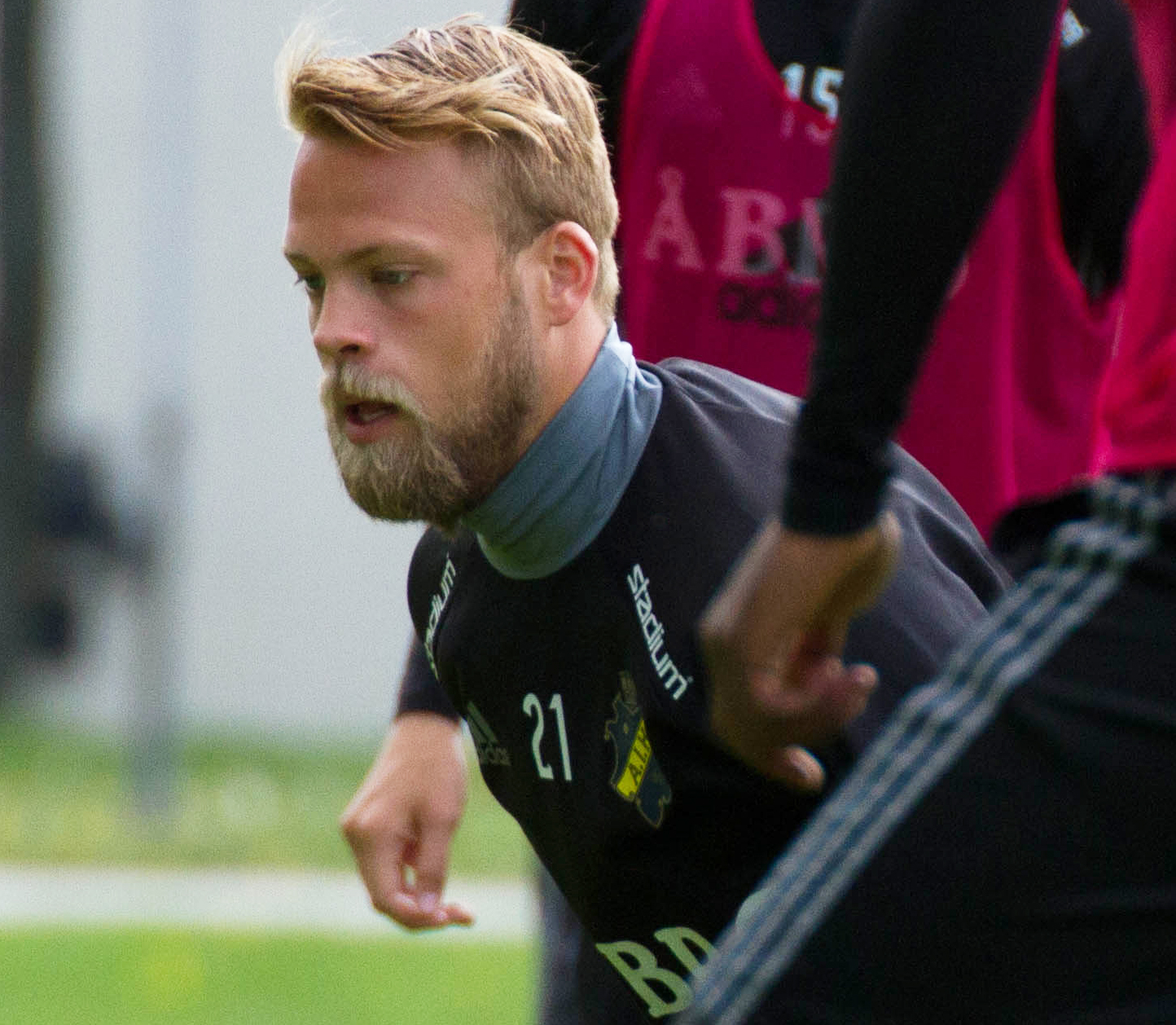
- Sundgren with AIK in 2016

Personal information
- Full name: Daniel Andreas Sundgren
- Date of birth: 22 November 1990 (age 35)
- Place of birth: Solna, Sweden
- Height: 1.78 m (5 ft 10 in)
- Position: Right-back

Team information
- Current team: Degerfors IF
- Number: 6

Youth career
- –2008: AIK

Senior career*
Years	Team	Apps	(Gls)
2008	AIK	0	(0)
2008	→ Täby IS (loan)	10	(2)
2009–2011	Väsby United	44	(5)
2009	→ Akropolis IF (loan)	10	(1)
2009	→ Arameisk-Syrianska IF (loan)	2	(0)
2010	→ Akropolis IF (loan)	3	(0)
2012–2015	Degerfors IF	110	(7)
2016–2019	AIK	90	(10)
2019–2022	Aris	73	(1)
2022–2024	Maccabi Haifa	47	(0)
2024–2025	Volos	25	(2)
2025–	Degerfors IF	26	(2)

International career^{‡}
2021–2023	Sweden	3	(0)
- * Club domestic league appearances and goals as of 8 July 2026 ‡ National team caps and goals as of 23:25, 16 June 2023 (UTC)

Daniel Andreas Sundgren (born 22 November 1990) is a Swedish professional footballer who plays as a right-back for Allsvenskan club Degerfors IF.

== Club career ==
On 20 November 2015, he returned to AIK. In October 2017, Sundgren was hospitalized with a blood clot in his lungs, ending his 2017 season early.

In June 2019, Sundgren joined Super League Greece side Aris, set to pen a three years' contract for an undisclosed fee.

On 20 June 2022, Sundgren signed a two-year contract with Maccabi Haifa in Israel.

In February 2025, it was announced that Sundgren will move to Degerfors IF from 1st July 2025.

== International career ==
On 1 September 2021, Sundgren was called up for the 2022 FIFA World Cup qualification matches against Spain on 2 September 2021 and against Greece on 8 September 2021, and for the friendly match against Uzbekistan on 5 September 2021. On 5 September 2021, he made his debut with national team in the friendly match against Uzbekistan. On 24 September 2022, he made his competitive international debut in a 1–4 loss against Serbia in the 2022–23 UEFA Nations League B, playing the full 90 minutes as a right back.

== Personal life ==
He is the son of former Swedish international footballer Gary Sundgren. Sundgren is of Finnish descent on his father's side.

== Career statistics ==
=== Club ===
As of match played 6 November 2022

Appearances and goals by club, season and competition
Club	Season	League			National cup		Continental		Total	
Club	Season	Division	Apps	Goals	Apps	Goals	Apps	Goals	Apps	Goals
Täby IS (loan)	2008	Division 3 Norra Svealand	10	2	—		—		10	2
Väsby United	2009	Superettan	5	0	0	0	—		5	0
Väsby United	2010	Superettan	14	1	1	0	—		15	1
Väsby United	2011	Division 1 Norra	25	4	2	0	—		27	4
Väsby United	Total		44	5	3	0	—		47	5
Akropolis IF (loan)	2009	Division 2 Östra Svealand	10	1	0	0	—		10	1
Arameiska-Syrianska (loan)	2009	Division 1 Norra	2	0	0	0	—		2	0
Akropolis IF (loan)	2010	Division 2 Södra Svealand	3	0	0	0	—		3	0
Degerfors IF	2012	Superettan	29	0	0	0	—		29	0
Degerfors IF	2013	Superettan	26	4	1	0	—		27	4
Degerfors IF	2014	Superettan	27	2	4	0	—		31	2
Degerfors IF	2015	Superettan	28	1	0	0	—		28	1
Degerfors IF	Total		110	7	5	0	—		115	7
AIK	2016	Allsvenskan	24	2	0	0	6 (Note: Appearances in UEFA Europa League)	0	30	2
AIK	2017	Allsvenskan	27	4	5	0	6	1	38	5
AIK	2018	Allsvenskan	24	1	0	0	4	1	28	2
AIK	2019	Allsvenskan	15	3	0	0	0	0	15	3
AIK	Total		90	10	5	0	16	2	111	12
Aris	2019–20	Super League Greece	14	0	1	0	4	0	19	0
Aris	2020–21	Super League Greece	31	0	3	0	0	0	34	0
Aris	2021–22	Super League Greece	28	1	4	0	1 (Note: Appearance in UEFA Europa Conference League)	0	33	1
Aris	Total		73	1	8	0	5	0	86	1
Maccabi Haifa	2022–23	Israeli Premier League	24	0	2	0	10 (Note: Appearances in UEFA Champions League)	1	36	1
Maccabi Haifa	2023–24	Israeli Premier League	0	0	0	0	7	0	7	0
Maccabi Haifa	Total		24	0	2	0	17	1	43	1
Career total			366	24	23	0	38	3	427	29

=== International ===
Appearances and goals by national team and year
National team	Year	Apps	Goals
Sweden	2021	1	0
Sweden	2022	1	0
Sweden	2023	1	0
Total		3	0

== Honours ==
AIK

- Allsvenskan: 2018

Maccabi Haifa

- Israeli Premier League: 2022-23
- Israel Super Cup: 2023
