= Uri Dahan =

Israeli footballer

Personal information
- Full name: Uri Dahan
- Date of birth: 7 December 1999 (age 26)
- Place of birth: Hatzor HaGlilit, Israel
- Height: 1.92 m (6 ft 4 in)
- Position: Center back

Team information
- Current team: Beitar Jerusalem
- Number: 20

Youth career
- 2009–2018: Ironi Kiryat Shmona

Senior career*
Years	Team	Apps	(Gls)
2018–2021	Ironi Kiryat Shmona	56	(1)
2021–	Maccabi Haifa	4	(0)
2022–2023	→ Beitar Jerusalem	21	(1)
2023–2024	→ Beitar Jerusalem	30	(0)
2024–	Beitar Jerusalem	31	(1)

International career^{‡}
2017	Israel U19	2	(0)
2020	Israel U21	1	(0)
- * Club domestic league appearances and goals as of 1 June 2026 ‡ National team caps and goals as of 1 June 2021 (UTC)

Uri Dahan (or Ori, Hebrew: אורי דהן; born 7 December 1999) is an Israeli footballer who plays as a centre-back for Beitar Jerusalem.

== Early life ==
Dahan was born in Hatzor HaGlilit, Israel, to a Sephardic Jewish family.

== Career ==
Dahan was born in Hatzor HaGlilit and raised in Rosh Pinna.

Dahan made his professional debut for Ironi Kiryat Shmona in the Israeli Premier League on 30 November 2019, in the home match against Maccabi Tel Aviv, which finished as a 0–1 loss.

== Honours ==
Maccabi Haifa

- Israeli Premier League: 2021–22
- Toto Cup: 2021–22
- Israel Super Cup: 2021, 2023

Beitar Jerusalem

- Israel State Cup: 2022–23
