= Goni Naor =

Israeli footballer

Personal information
- Full name: Goni Naor
- Date of birth: 23 April 1999 (age 27)
- Place of birth: Har Adar, Israel
- Height: 1.85 m (6 ft 1 in)
- Position: Midfielder

Team information
- Current team: Maccabi Haifa
- Number: 5

Youth career
- 2008–2015: Beitar Jerusalem
- 2015–2017: Maccabi Tel Aviv
- 2017–2018: Hapoel Katamon

Senior career*
Years	Team	Apps	(Gls)
2017–2020	Hapoel Katamon	51	(2)
2020–2023	Hapoel Jerusalem	54	(3)
2023–	Maccabi Haifa	25	(1)
2024–2025	→ Hapoel Tel Aviv (loan)	35	(2)
2026	→ AEL (loan)	19	(0)

International career^{‡}
2015	Israel U17	3	(0)
2016	Israel U18	3	(0)
2022–2024	Israel	2	(0)
- * Club domestic league appearances and goals as of 14 June 2026 ‡ National team caps and goals as of 11 June 2024

Goni Naor (Hebrew: גוני נאור; born 23 April 1999) is an Israeli footballer who plays as a midfielder for Israeli club Maccabi Haifa.

== Early life ==
Naor was born in Har Adar, Israel, to a Jewish family.

== Club career ==
Naor grew up in the Beitar Jerusalem youth academy. In 2015, signed for the Maccabi Tel Aviv. Two years later, signed to Hapoel Katamon. He made his debut with the senior team on 3 August 2017.

On 31 July 2021, Naor scored the only goal in the 1–0 win against Beitar Jerusalem, which was the first Jerusalem derby match in 21 years.

== International career ==
Naor has been a youth international since 2015.

He was called up for the senior Israel national team in October 2021, during their 2022 FIFA World Cup qualifiers - UEFA.

== Honours ==
Maccabi Haifa

- Israeli Premier League: 2022–23
- Israel Super Cup: 2023
