= Ilay Hagag =

Israeli footballer

Personal information
- Full name: Ilay Hagag
- Date of birth: 7 November 2001 (age 25)
- Place of birth: Kiryat Gat, Israel
- Height: 1.75 m (5 ft 9 in)
- Position: Midfielder

Team information
- Current team: F.C. Ashdod (on loan from Beitar Jerusalem)
- Number: 28

Youth career
- 2011–2017: Maccabi Kiryat Gat
- 2017–2021: Maccabi Haifa

Senior career*
Years	Team	Apps	(Gls)
2020–2025	Maccabi Haifa	29	(3)
2021–2023	→ Hapoel Afula (loan)	78	(13)
2025–	Beitar Jerusalem	1	(0)
2026–	→ F.C. Ashdod (loan)	12	(1)

International career^{‡}
2022–2023	Israel U21	8	(0)
- * Club domestic league appearances and goals as of 24 June 2026 ‡ National team caps and goals as of 03:36, 1 December 2023 (UTC)

Ilay Hagag (Hebrew: עילאי חג'ג'; born 07 Nov 2001) is an Israeli professional footballer who plays as a midfielder for F.C. Ashdod, on loan from Beitar Jerusalem.

== Early life ==
Hagag was born in Kiryat Gat, Israel, to a Jewish family. He is a youth product of Maccabi Kiryat Gat F.C. and Maccabi Haifa. On 11 August 2020, he signed his first professional contract with Maccabi Haifa. On 5 August 2021, he joined Hapoel Afula on a 2 year-loan in the Liga Leumit. He made his debut for Hapoel Afula on 5 August 2021 in a game against Hapoel Kfar Saba F.C. in the 2021-22 Toto Cup.

On 16 March 2023, he returned to Maccabi Haifa and extended his contract with them for 3 years. On 18 July 2023, he debuted with them in a 2–1 UEFA Champions League qualifying win over Ħamrun Spartans.

== International career ==
Hagag is a youth international for Israel. He was part of the Israel U21s for the 2023 UEFA European Under-21 Championship.

== Career statistics ==
=== Club ===
As of 04 June 2023

Appearances and goals by club, season and competition
Club	Season	Division	League		National cup		League Cup		Other		Continental		Total	
Club	Season	Division	Apps	Goals	Apps	Goals	Apps	Goals	Apps	Goals	Apps	Goals	Apps	Goals
Maccabi Haifa	2020-21	1	0	0	0	0	0	0	0	0	0	0	0	0
Hapoel Afula	2021-22	2	36	6	0	0	4	0	0	0	0	0	40	6
Hapoel Afula	2022-23	2	33	4	5	3	0	0	0	0	0	0	38	7
Career total			69	10	5	3	4	0	0	0	0	0	78	13

=== International ===
Appearances and goals by national team and year
National team	Year	Apps	Goals
Israel U21	2022	2	0
Israel U21	2023	2	0
Total		4	0

== See also ==
- List of Jewish footballers
- List of Jews in sports
- List of Israelis
