= Andorf =

Municipality in Upper Austria

- Municipality
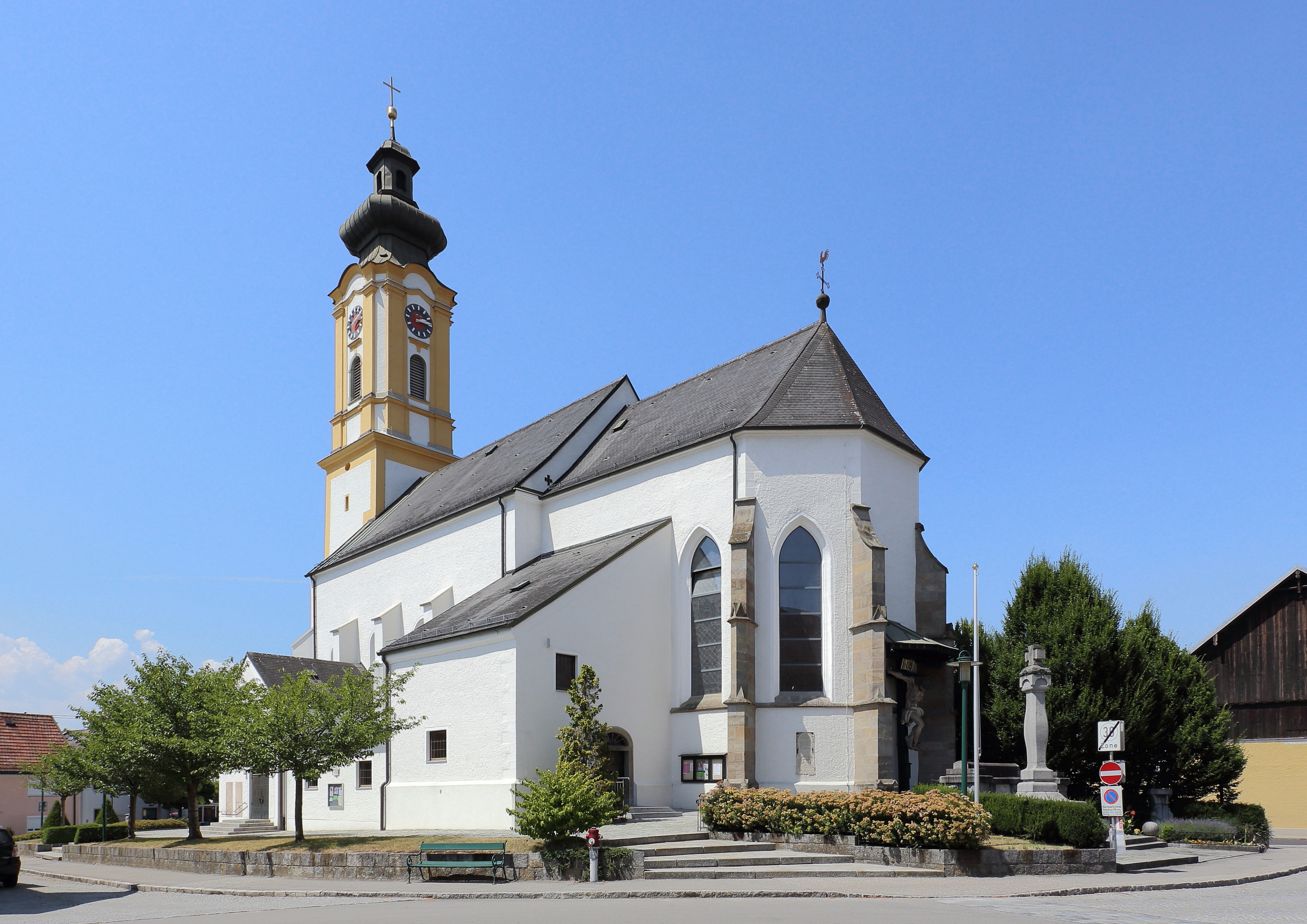

- Coat of arms

- Location within Austria
- Coordinates: 48°22′00″N 13°34′00″E
- Country: Austria
- State: Upper Austria
- District: Schärding

Government
  - Mayor: Karl Buchinger (ÖVP)

Area
  - Total: 37.67 km^{2} (14.54 sq mi)
- Elevation: 346 m (1,135 ft)

Population (2018-01-01)
  - Total: 5,174
  - Density: 137.4/km^{2} (355.7/sq mi)
- Time zone: UTC+1 (CET)
  - Summer (DST): UTC+2 (CEST)
- Postal code: 4770
- Area code: 07766
- Vehicle registration: SD
- Website: www.andorf.at

Andorf is a municipality in the district of Schärding in Upper Austria, Austria. As of 2024, it had a population of 5,218.

== Geography ==
Andorf is divided into the 7 cadastral subdivisions: Andorf, Burgerding, Heitzing, Kurzenkirchen, Oberndorf, Schulleredt and Teuflau.

The 56 localities which belong to the municipality are Andorf, An der Fernstraße, Autzing, Bach, Basling, Breitenberg, Bruck, Burgerding, Eberleinsedt, Edt bei Heitzing, Edt beim Pfarrhof, Erlau, Gerolding, Getzing, Großpichl, Großschörgern, Haula, Hebertspram, Heitzing, Heitzingerau, Hier, Hof, Hörzberg, Hötzlarn, Hötzenedt, Humerleiten, Hutstock, Kleinpichl, Kleinschörgern, Kreilern, Kurzenkirchen, Laab, Lauterbrunn, Lichtegg, Linden, Lohstampf, Matzing, Mayrhof, Niederhartwagen, Niederleiten, Oberndorf, Pimpfing, Pram, Pranzen, Rablern, Radlern, Seifriedsedt, Sonnleiten, Schärdingerau, Schießedt, Schulleredt, Teuflau, Untergriesbach, Winertsham, Winertshamerau and Winteraigen.

== History ==
After the Duchy of Bavaria was formed, the locality belonged to Bavaria until 1780. As a result of the Treaty of Teschen, Austria received Innviertel and thus Andorf. During the Napoleonic Wars it once more belonged to Bavaria, but since 1814 it has been a part of Upper Austria.

During the incorporation of Austria into Greater Germany by Nazi Germany on 13 March 1938, the locality belonged to "Gau Oberdonau". After 1945, Upper Austria was restored.

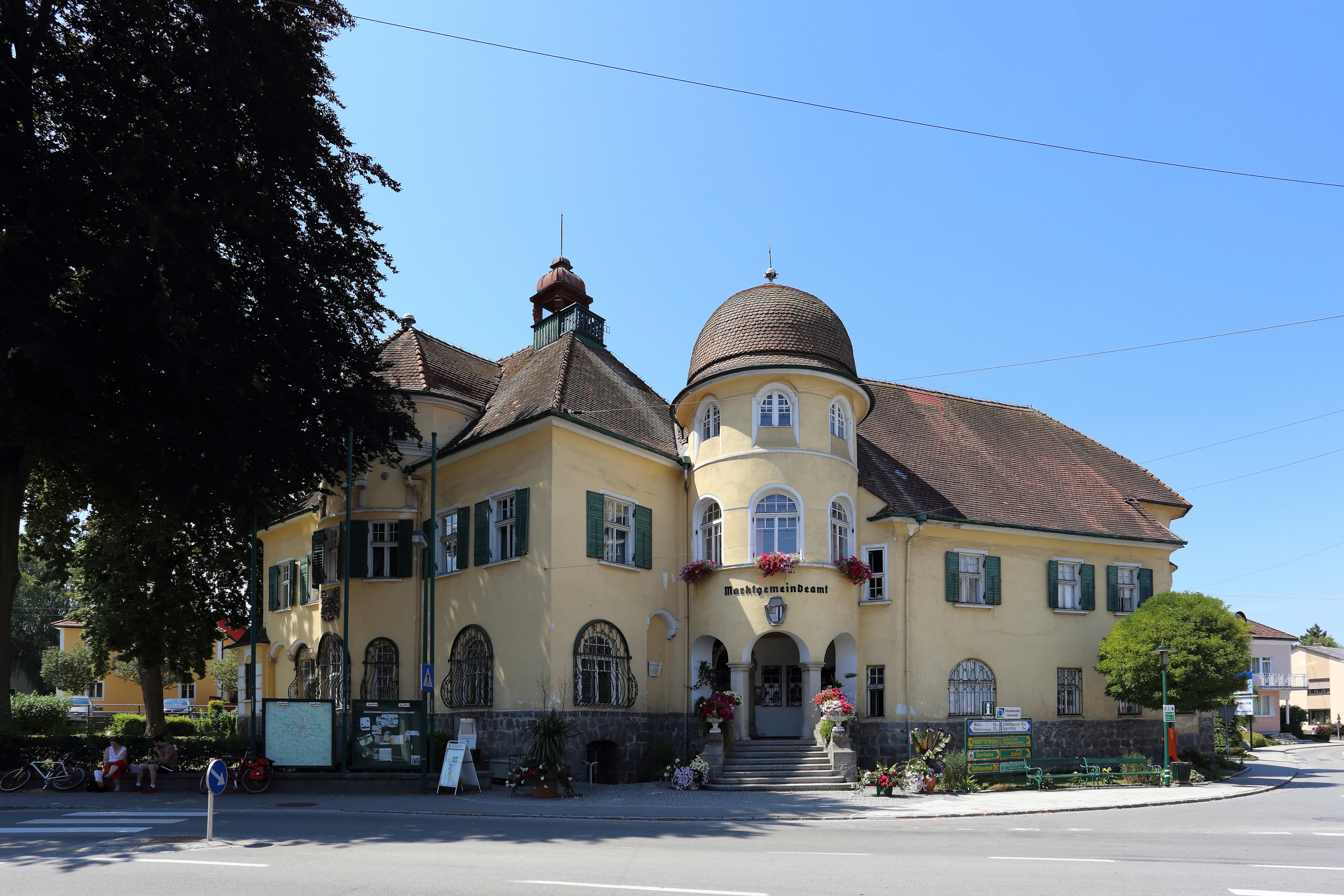
Andorf Marktgemeindeamt (Town hall)

== Mayor ==
- Since 2003: Peter Pichler (SPÖ)

== Personalities ==
- Franz Xaver Gerl (1764-1827), Mozart friend and Mozart singer
