= 2020–21 Toto Cup Leumit =

Tournament details
- Country: Israel
- Teams: 16

Final positions
- Champions: Hapoel Nof HaGalil (1st title)
- Runners-up: Hapoel Petah Tikva

The 2020–21 Toto Cup Leumit was the 31st season of the second tier League Cup (as a separate competition) since its introduction. It was divided into two stages. First, the sixteen Liga Leumit teams were divided into four regionalized groups, the groups winners with the best record advancing to the final, while the rest of the clubs were scheduled to play classification play-offs accordance according the group results.

The final, played on 20 August 2020, Hapoel Nof HaGalil defeated Hapoel Petah Tikva 3–0.

== Group stage ==
Groups were allocated according to geographic distribution of the clubs

=== Group A ===
Pos	Team	Pld	W	D	L	GF	GA	GD	Pts	Qualification or relegation	HNG	MAN	IKS	HAC
1	Hapoel Nof HaGalil	3	3	0	0	8	3	+5	9	Qualified to the final	—	3–0		1–0
2	Maccabi Ahi Nazareth	3	1	1	1	4	6	−2	4	5-8th classification play-offs		—		1–0
3	Hapoel Iksal	3	1	1	1	4	7	−3	4	9-12th classification play-offs	0–4	3–3	—	
4	Hapoel Acre	3	0	0	3	0	3	−3	0	13-16th classification play-offs			0–1	—

Updated to match(es) played on 9 August 2018. Source: Israel Football Association
Rules for classification: 1) points; 2) goal difference; 3) number of wins; 4) goals scored; 5) head to head; 6)deciding match.

=== Group B ===
Pos	Team	Pld	W	D	L	GF	GA	GD	Pts	Qualification or relegation	HPT	FQS	HUF	HAF
1	Hapoel Petah Tikva	3	3	0	0	5	0	+5	9	Qualified to the final	—			2–0
2	F.C. Kafr Qasim	3	2	0	1	8	2	+6	6	5-8th classification play-offs	0–1	—	2–1	
3	Hapoel Umm al-Fahm	3	1	0	2	5	4	+1	3	9-12th classification play-offs	0–2		—	4–0
4	Hapoel Afula	3	0	0	3	0	12	−12	0	13-16th classification play-offs		0–6		—

Updated to match(es) played on 9 August 2018. Source: Israel Football Association
Rules for classification: 1) points; 2) goal difference; 3) number of wins; 4) goals scored; 5) head to head; 6)deciding match.

=== Group C ===
Pos	Team	Pld	W	D	L	GF	GA	GD	Pts	Qualification or relegation	HKS	HRA	HRG	HRS
1	Hapoel Kfar Shalem	3	2	1	0	8	2	+6	7	3-4th classification play-offs	—	1–1	3–1	4–0
2	Hapoel Ra'anana	3	1	2	0	5	3	+2	5	5-8th classification play-offs		—		3–1
3	Hapoel Ramat Gan	3	0	2	1	3	5	−2	2	9-12th classification play-offs		1–1	—	
4	Hapoel Ramat HaSharon	3	0	2	1	2	8	−6	2	13-16th classification play-offs			1–1	—

Updated to match(es) played on 9 August 2018. Source: Israel Football Association
Rules for classification: 1) points; 2) goal difference; 3) number of wins; 4) goals scored; 5) head to head; 6)deciding match.

=== Group D ===
Pos	Team	Pld	W	D	L	GF	GA	GD	Pts	Qualification or relegation	TAB	HRL	HAJ	SNZ
1	Beitar Tel Aviv Bat Yam	3	2	1	0	6	2	+4	7	3-4th classification play-offs	—		2–0	
2	Hapoel Rishon LeZion	3	2	0	1	6	5	+1	6	5-8th classification play-offs	1–3	—		3–2
3	Hapoel Jerusalem	3	1	0	2	3	5	−2	3	9-12th classification play-offs		0–2	—	
4	Sektzia Nes Tziona	6	0	1	5	4	7	−3	1	13-16th classification play-offs	1–1		1–3	—

Updated to match(es) played on 9 August 2018. Source: Israel Football Association
Rules for classification: 1) points; 2) goal difference; 3) number of wins; 4) goals scored; 5) head to head; 6)deciding match.

== Classification play-offs ==
=== 13-16th classification play-offs ===
20 August 2020	Sektzia Nes Tziona	1-2	Hapoel Ramat HaSharon
		[ Report]

20 August 2020	Hapoel Acre	4-2	Hapoel Afula
		[ Report]

=== 9-12th classification play-offs ===
19 August 2020	Hapoel Umm al-Fahm	3-1	Hapoel Ramat Gan
		[ Report]

20 August 2020	Hapoel Iksal	2-2 (a.e.t.) (5-4 p)	Hapoel Jerusalem
		[ Report]

=== 5-8th classification play-offs ===
20 August 2020	Hapoel Ra'anana	1-2	Maccabi Ahi Nazareth
		[ Report]

20 August 2020	Hapoel Rishon LeZion	3-1	F.C. Kafr Qasim
		[ Report]

=== 3-4th classification play-offs ===
19 August 2020	Beitar Tel Aviv Bat Yam	2-4	Hapoel Kfar Shalem
		[ Report]

== Final ==
20 August 2020

Hapoel Petah Tikva	0-3	Hapoel Nof HaGalil
	[ Report]

== Final rankings ==
R	Team
1	Hapoel Nof HaGalil
2	Hapoel Petah Tikva
3	Hapoel Kfar Shalem
4	Beitar Tel Aviv Bat Yam
5-6	Hapoel Rishon LeZion; Maccabi Ahi Nazareth
7-8	F.C. Kafr Qasim; Hapoel Ra'anana
9-10	Hapoel Umm al-Fahm; Hapoel Iksal
11-12	Hapoel Ramat Gan; Hapoel Jerusalem
13-14	Hapoel Ramat HaSharon; Hapoel Acre
15-16	Sektzia Nes Tziona; Hapoel Afula

== See also ==
- 2020–21 Toto Cup Al
- 2020–21 Liga Leumit
- 2020–21 Israel State Cup
