= Erik Shuranov =

German footballer

Erik Shuranov Ерік Шуранов
Personal information
- Full name: Erik Ihorovych Shuranov
- Date of birth: 22 February 2002 (age 24)
- Place of birth: Bamberg, Germany
- Height: 1.84 m (6 ft 0 in)
- Position: Centre-forward

Team information
- Current team: 1. FC Schweinfurt 05
- Number: 9

Youth career
- –2010: FC Bayern Kickers Nürnberg
- 2010–2020: 1. FC Nürnberg

Senior career*
Years	Team	Apps	(Gls)
2020–2023	1. FC Nürnberg II	5	(3)
2020–2023	1. FC Nürnberg	57	(12)
2023–2025	Maccabi Haifa	7	(0)
2025–	1. FC Schweinfurt 05	17	(4)

International career^{‡}
2018	Ukraine U17	3	(4)
2019	Ukraine U18	2	(1)
2022	Germany U20	4	(0)
2021–2022	Germany U21	7	(2)
- * Club domestic league appearances and goals as of 30 May 2026 ‡ National team caps and goals as of 19 June 2025

Erik Ihorovych Shuranov (Ukrainian: Ерік Ігорович Шуранов; born 22 February 2002) is a German professional footballer who plays as a centre-forward for German 3. Liga club 1. FC Schweinfurt 05.

== Career ==
Shuranov made his professional debut for 1. FC Nürnberg in the 2. Bundesliga on 13 December 2020, coming on as a substitute in the 80th minute for Felix Lohkemper against Würzburger Kickers. The home match finished as a 2–1 win for Nürnberg.

== International career ==
A former youth international for Ukraine, Shuranov most recently represented the Germany U21s.

== Personal life ==
Shuranov's parents are Ukrainians of Russian origin, who spoke Russian at home. He also has Jewish roots.

== Honours ==
Maccabi Haifa

- Israel Super Cup: 2023
