= Messay Dego =

Israeli footballer and manager

Messay Dego מסאי דגו
Personal information
- Date of birth: February 15, 1986 (age 40)
- Place of birth: Addis Ababa, Ethiopia
- Position: Midfielder

Team information
- Current team: Hapoel Ramat Gan (Manager)

Youth career
- Hapoel Tel Aviv

Senior career*
Years	Team	Apps	(Gls)
2003–2008	Hapoel Tel Aviv	8	(0)
2006	→ Hapoel Ashkelon (loan)		
2006–2007	→ F.C. Ashdod (loan)	19	(0)
2008	→ Hapoel Ra'anana (loan)	12	(0)
2008	Sektzia Ness Ziona	9	(0)
2009–2010	Hapoel Rishon LeZion	46	(9)
2010–2012	Maccabi Herzliya	53	(7)
2012	AEP Paphos	0	(0)
2012–2013	Hapoel Ashkelon	13	(0)
2013	Hapoel Katamon	9	(0)
2014	Hapoel Kiryat Shalom	11	(4)

International career
2006	Israel U21	1	(0)

Managerial career
- 2016–2017: Hapoel Kfar Saba (assistant manager)
- 2017–2018: Hapoel Kfar Saba
- 2018: Hapoel Ashkelon
- 2018–2019: Hapoel Petah Tikva
- 2019: Ironi Kiryat Shmona
- 2020–2021: Hapoel Petah Tikva
- 2021–2022: Hapoel Acre
- 2022–2023: Maccabi Haifa (youth)
- 2023–2024: Maccabi Haifa
- 2024: Hapoel Tel Aviv
- 2025: Bnei Yehuda
- 2025–: Hapoel Ramat Gan
- * Club domestic league appearances and goals

Messay Dego (Hebrew: מסאי דגו; born February 15, 1986) is a former association footballer and manager. Born in Ethiopia, he played for the Israel under-21 national team.

== Early life ==
Dego was born in Addis Ababa, Ethiopia, to an Ethiopian-Jewish family. He immigrated to Israel in the 1990s, with his parents and brothers. His eldest brother Baruch Dego is also a former association footballer, who played for the Israel national team.

== Managerial statistics ==
As of 25 May 2024

Managerial record by team and tenure
Team	Nat	From	To	Record				
Team	Nat	From	To	G	W	D	L	Win %
Hapoel Kfar Saba	(Israel)	1 July 2017	23 January 2018	21	13	3	5	61.90
Hapoel Ashkelon	(Israel)	14 February 2018	30 June 2018	5	0	1	4	0.00
Hapoel Petah Tikva	(Israel)	14 July 2018	19 May 2019	25	9	8	8	36.00
Ironi Kiryat Shmona	(Israel)	19 May 2019	20 October 2019	7	1	1	5	14.29
Hapoel Petah Tikva	(Israel)	5 February 2020	1 December 2020	26	7	7	12	26.92
Hapoel Acre	(Israel)	10 April 2020	1 December 2020	38	11	15	12	28.95
Maccabi Haifa	(Israel)	1 July 2023	26 May 2024	59	33	13	13	55.93
Career totals				181	74	48	59	40.88

== Honours ==
=== As a manager ===
Maccabi Haifa

- Israel Super Cup: 2023
