= Pierre Cornud =

French footballer (born 1996)

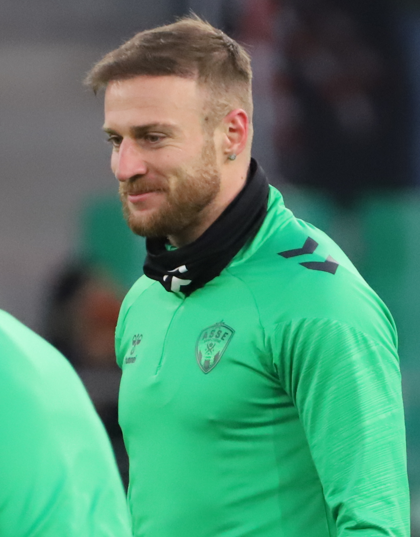
- Cornud with Saint-Étienne in 2025

Personal information
- Full name: Pierre Cornud
- Date of birth: 12 December 1996 (age 29)
- Place of birth: Avignon, France
- Height: 1.77 m (5 ft 10 in)
- Position: Left-back

Team information
- Current team: Maccabi Haifa
- Number: 27

Youth career
- Montpellier

Senior career*
Years	Team	Apps	(Gls)
2014–2016	Montpellier B	31	(0)
2016–2017	Dijon B	21	(0)
2017–2018	Mallorca B	29	(0)
2017–2020	Mallorca	0	(0)
2018–2019	→ Linense (loan)	35	(0)
2019–2020	→ Oviedo B (loan)	20	(1)
2020	→ Ibiza (loan)	6	(0)
2020–2021	Sabadell	29	(0)
2021–2023	Oviedo	31	(0)
2022–2023	→ Maccabi Haifa (loan)	27	(0)
2023–2024	Maccabi Haifa	32	(1)
2024–2025	Saint-Étienne	11	(0)
2025–	Maccabi Haifa	15	(0)
- * Club domestic league appearances and goals as of 23 June 2026

Pierre Cornud (born 12 December 1996) is a French-Israeli professional footballer who plays as a left-back for Israeli Premier League club Maccabi Haifa.

== Club career ==
Born in Avignon, Cornud was a Montpellier HSC youth graduate, and made his senior debut with the reserves in the 2014–15 season, suffering relegation from the Championnat de France Amateur. In 2016 he moved to Dijon FCO, appearing almost exclusively with the B-side; his only match for the main squad occurred on 27 July 2016, in a friendly against Sunderland.

On 11 August 2017, Cornud signed a three-year contract with RCD Mallorca, after impressing in a trial basis; he was initially assigned to the B-team in Tercera División. On 6 July of the following year, he was loaned to Segunda División B side Real Balompédica Linense as a part of Stoichkov's transfer.

On 30 August 2019, Cornud moved to another reserve team, Real Oviedo Vetusta on loan for the 2019–20 campaign. The following 29 January, he left the club and moved to fellow third tier team UD Ibiza, also in a temporary deal.

On 14 August 2020, Cornud agreed to a permanent deal with CE Sabadell FC, newly promoted to Segunda División. He made his professional debut on 19 September, starting in a 2–1 away loss against Rayo Vallecano.

On 2 July 2021, after Sabadell's relegation, Cornud signed a two-year contract with Real Oviedo also in the second tier.

== Honours ==
Maccabi Haifa

- Israeli Premier League: 2022–23
- Israel Super Cup: 2023
