= Ali Mohamed (footballer) =

Nigerien footballer

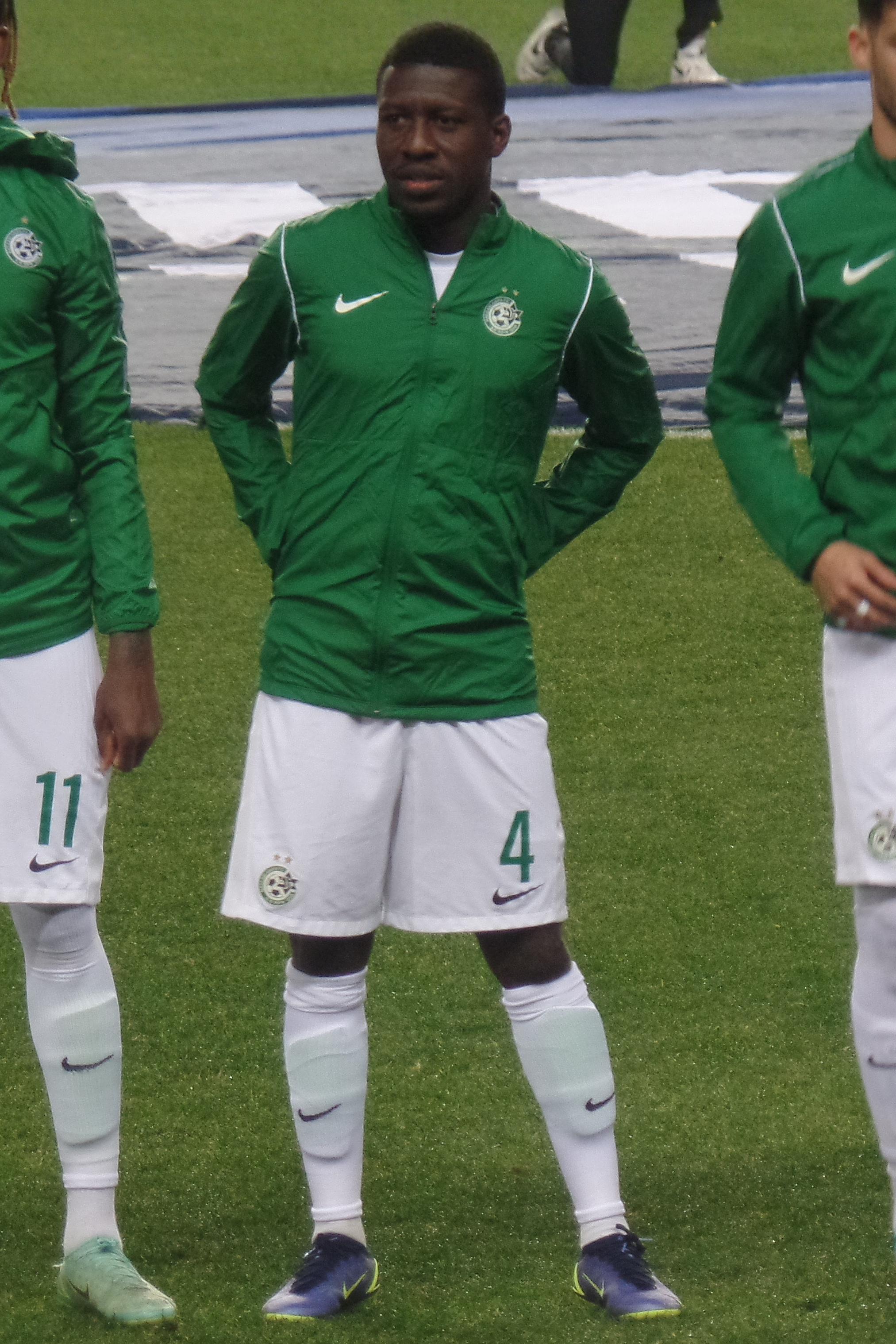
- Mohamed with Maccabi Haifa in 2022

Personal information
- Full name: Ali Mohamed Al Faz
- Date of birth: 7 October 1995 (age 31)
- Place of birth: Niamey, Niger
- Height: 1.70 m (5 ft 7 in)
- Position: Midfielder

Team information
- Current team: Maccabi Haifa
- Number: 4

Youth career
- AS FAN
- 2013–2014: Bordeaux

Senior career*
Years	Team	Apps	(Gls)
2012–2013	AS FAN		
2013–2014	Bordeaux B	0	(0)
2014–2015	AS FAN		
2015–2016	Beitar Tel Aviv Ramla	28	(1)
2016–2019	Maccabi Netanya	82	(1)
2019–2021	Beitar Jerusalem	65	(3)
2021–	Maccabi Haifa	145	(0)

International career^{‡}
2013–	Niger	43	(0)
- * Club domestic league appearances and goals as of 23 June 2026 ‡ National team caps and goals as of 15 November 2021

Ali Mohamed Al Faz (born 7 October 1995) is a Nigerien professional footballer who plays as a midfielder for Israeli Premier League club Maccabi Haifa and the Niger national team.

== Club career ==
=== Early career ===
Mohamed started his career at AS FAN and made his debut in the senior team at the age of 17. In 2013, he joined the youth department of Bordeaux and practiced intermittently with the reserve team.

In the summer of 2015, he signed with Beitar Tel Aviv Ramla; on 7 September, he made his debut for the club in a 4–1 loss to Bnei Lod. On 19 February 2016, he scored his first goal in a 3–2 victory against Bnei Lod.

On 6 July, Mohamed signed a contract with Maccabi Netanya. On 17 March 2017, he scored his first goal for the club in a 4–0 win against Hapoel Katamon Jerusalem. Mohamed finished the season with one goal and five assists.

On 22 January 2018, Mohamed signed a new contract at Maccabi Netanya until the end of the 2019–20 season. In the new contract, his release clause was set at $2.5 million.

=== Beitar Jerusalem ===
On 10 June 2019, Mohamed signed a three-year contract with Beitar Jerusalem for a fee of €1.7 million. Upon his signing with the club, a sect of the club's fans named La Familia petitioned to have his Muslim-sounding name changed despite Mohamed being a Christian.

In November, Mohamed was subjected to racist abuse from his own fans during an open training session. The club's owner, Moshe Hogeg, came out in support of Mohamed, saying that the club would pursue legal action against La Familia and any of the club's fans that were found to have hurled racist abuse at the player.

== International career ==
On 6 September 2013, Mohamed made his debut for the Niger national football team in a 0–1 home loss against Burkina Faso, during the 2014 FIFA World Cup qualification (CAF).

== Personal life ==
Although his name indicates his Muslim origin (his late father's faith), Mohamed claimed to be a devout Christian (his mother's faith).

Mohamed also received a year-long Israeli residency status in August 2022.

== Honours ==
Maccabi Netanya

- Liga Leumit: 2016–17

Beitar Jerusalem

- Toto Cup: 2019–20

Maccabi Haifa

- Israeli Premier League: 2021–22, 2022-23
- Israel Toto Cup (Ligat Ha'Al): 2021–22
- Israel Super Cup: 2021, 2023
