= Ofir Kriaf =

Israeli footballer

Ofir Kriaf אופיר קריאף
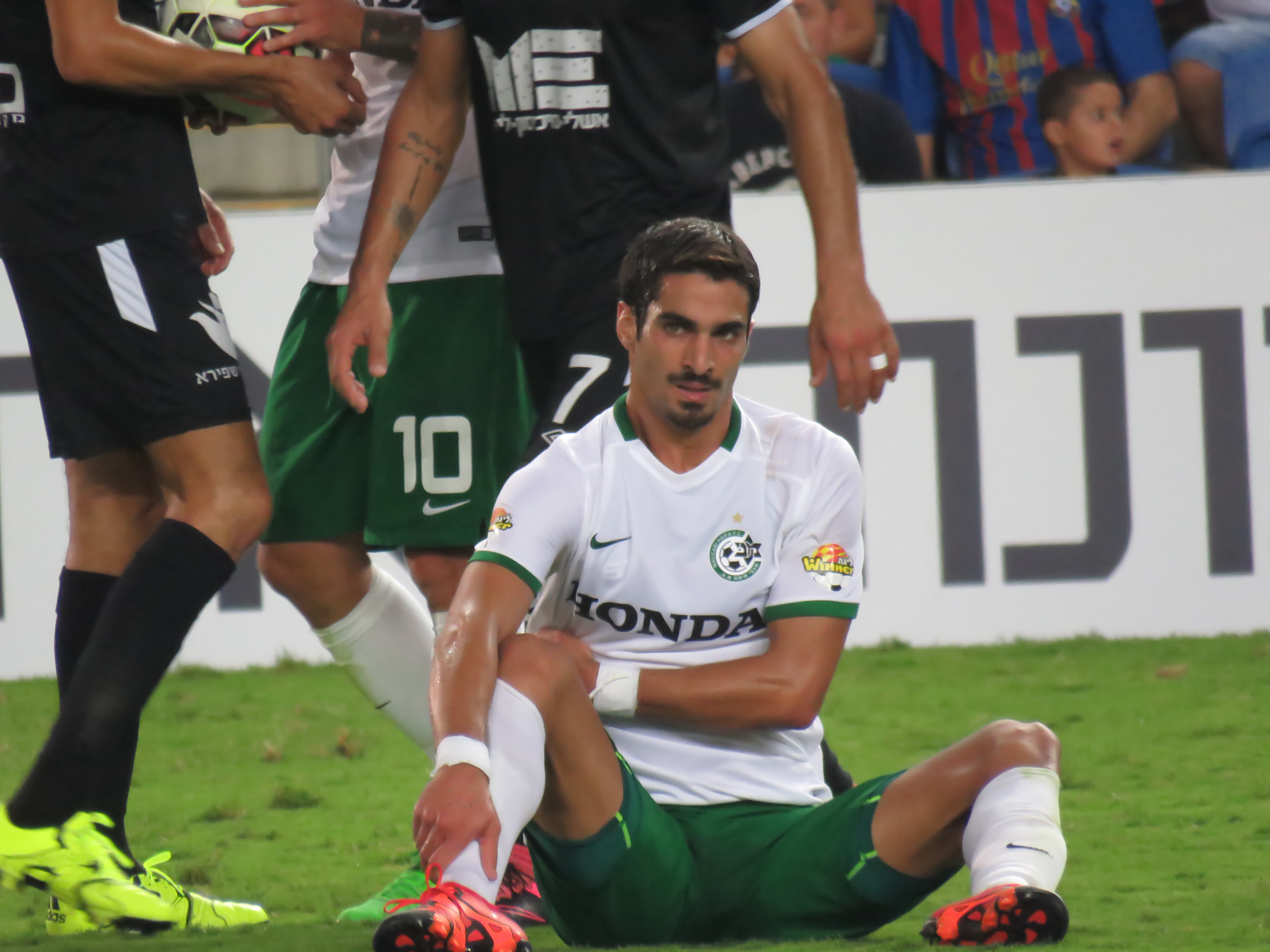
- Kriaf playing for Maccabi Haifa in 2015

Personal information
- Full name: Ofir Kriaf
- Date of birth: 17 March 1991 (age 35)
- Place of birth: Jerusalem
- Height: 1.78 m (5 ft 10 in)
- Position: Defensive midfielder

Senior career*
Years	Team	Apps	(Gls)
2011–2015	Beitar Jerusalem	88	(3)
2015–2016	Maccabi Haifa	15	(0)
2016–2018	Ironi Kiryat Shmona	27	(2)
2018–2025	Beitar Jerusalem	159	(8)
2025	Ashdod	3	(0)

International career
2010–2013	Israel U21	3	(1)
- * Club domestic league appearances and goals

Ofir Kriaf (Hebrew: אופיר קריאף; born 17 March 1991) is an Israeli former professional footballer who plays as a midfielder.

== Early life ==
Kriaf was born in Jerusalem, to a family of Tunisian Jewish descent.

== International career ==
He scored in Israel's 1–0 win against England U-21 on 11 June 2013, at the 2013 UEFA Euros Under-21 that were held in Israel.

== Honours ==
=== Club ===
Maccabi Haifa

- Israel State Cup (1): 2015–16

Beitar Jerusalem

- Israeli Toto Cup: 2019–20
- Israel State Cup: 2022–23
