= Timothy Muzie =

Israeli footballer (born 2005)

Personal information
- Full name: Timothy Lior Muzie
- Date of birth: 24 August 2001 (age 25)
- Place of birth: Israel
- Height: 1.84 m (6 ft 0 in)
- Positions: Midfielder; winger

Team information
- Current team: Beitar Jerusalem
- Number: 11

Youth career
- 2014-2020: Maccabi Haifa

Senior career*
Years	Team	Apps	(Gls)
2020–2023	Maccabi Haifa	4	(0)
2021	→ Hapoel Kfar Saba (loan)	14	(3)
2021–2022	→ Hapoel Nof HaGalil (loan)	27	(1)
2022–2023	→ Ironi Kiryat Shmona (loan)	30	(0)
2023–	Beitar Jerusalem	96	(16)

International career^{‡}
2022	Israel U21	2	(0)
- * Club domestic league appearances and goals as of 23 June 2026 ‡ National team caps and goals as of 19 November 2022

Timothy Lior Muzie (Hebrew: טימוטי ליאור מוזי; born 24 August 2001) is an Israeli professional footballer who plays as a midfielder or winger for Beitar Jerusalem.

== Early life ==
Muzie was born in Israel, to a Congolese father, and to a South African mother named Maureen. At the age of eighteen, he also obtained Israeli citizenship.

== Club career ==
As a youth player, Muzie joined the youth academy of Maccabi Haifa. Israeli newspaper Maariv wrote in 2021 that he "was not really part of Maccabi Haifa's rotation and the club preferred that he move to another team and accumulate minutes" while playing for the club.

In 2021, he was sent on loan to Hapoel Kfar Saba, before being sent on loan to Hapoel Nof HaGalil the same year. One year later, he was sent on loan to Ironi Kiryat Shmona. Subsequently, he signed for Beitar Jerusalem in 2023.
