= Itamar Nitzan =

Israeli footballer

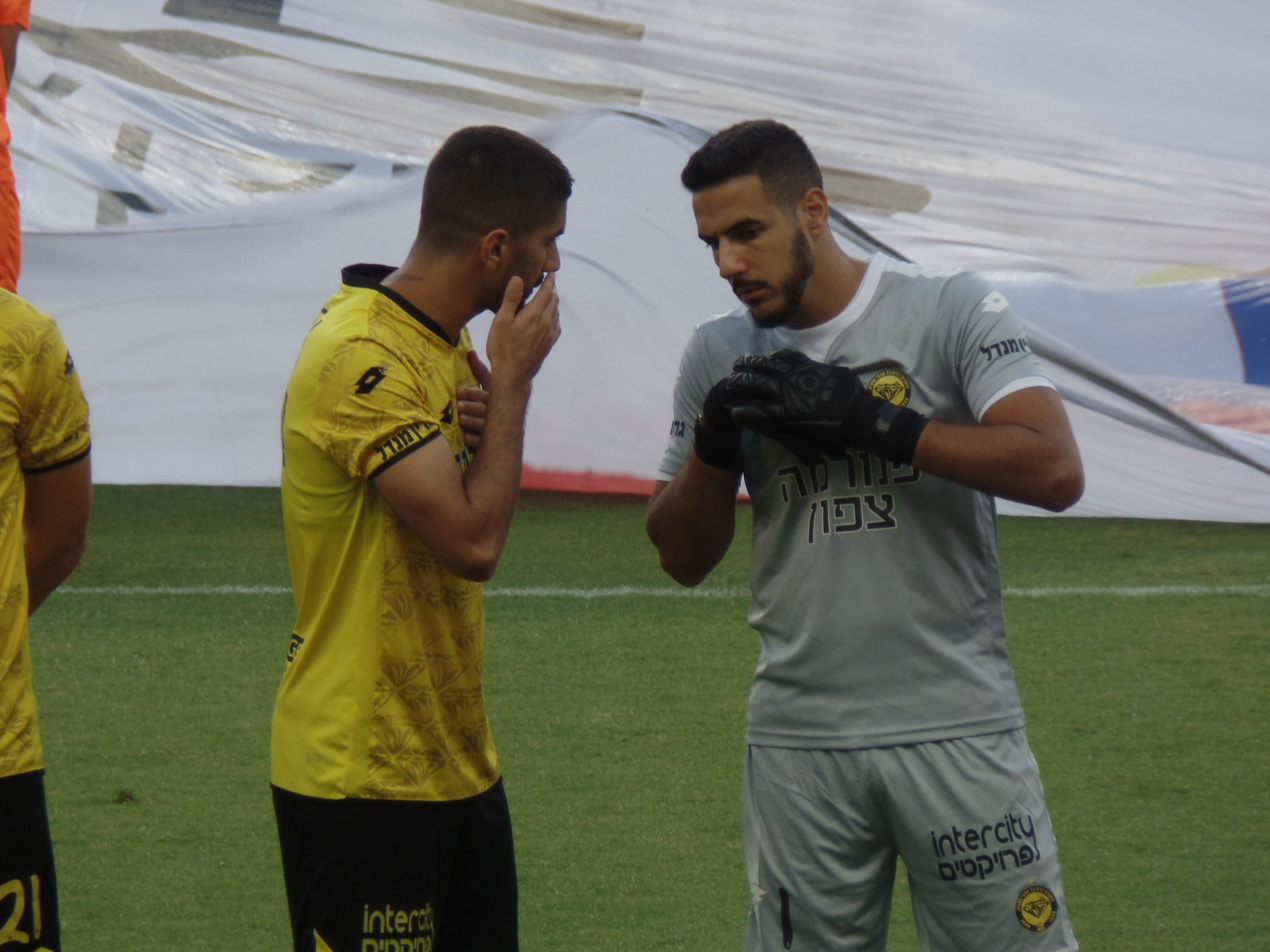

Personal information
- Full name: Itamar Nitzan
- Date of birth: 23 June 1987 (age 39)
- Place of birth: Herzliya, Israel
- Height: 1.85 m (6 ft 1 in)
- Position: Goalkeeper

Youth career
- Maccabi Herzliya

Senior career*
Years	Team	Apps	(Gls)
2006–2011	Maccabi Herzliya	85	(0)
2011	→ Hapoel Tel Aviv (loan)	5	(0)
2011–2018	Ironi Kiryat Shmona	57	(0)
2013–2014	→ Ironi Ramat HaSharon (loan)	33	(0)
2014–2016	→ Maccabi Petah Tikva (loan)	40	(0)
2018–2022	Beitar Jerusalem	120	(0)
2022–2023	Maccabi Netanya	32	(0)
2023–2024	Maccabi Haifa	13	(0)
Total		385	(0)

International career^{‡}
2004	Israel U17	1	(0)
2005–2006	Israel U19	5	(0)
2008	Israel U21	1	(0)
2021	Israel	1	(0)

Managerial career
- 2024–: Bnei Yehuda (assistant manager)
- * Club domestic league appearances and goals as of 24 May 2024 ‡ National team caps and goals as of 24 May 2024

Itamar Nitzan (or Nizan, Hebrew: איתמר ניצן; born 23 June 1987) is an Israeli former footballer who played as a goalkeeper.

== Early life ==
Nitzan was born and raised in Herzliya, Israel, to an Israeli family of Jewish descent.

== International career ==
He made his debut for Israel national football team on 5 June 2021 in a friendly against Montenegro. He played a full game in a 3–1 away victory.

== Honours ==
Maccabi Herzliya

- Israeli Toto Cup: 2006–07

Hapoel Tel Aviv

- Israel State Cup: 2010–11

Ironi Kiryat Shmona

- Israeli Premier League: 2011–12
- Israeli Toto Cup: 2011–12

Maccabi Petah Tikva

- Israeli Toto Cup: 2015–16

Beitar Jerusalem

- Israeli Toto Cup: 2019–20

Maccabi Netanya

- Israeli Toto Cup: 2022–23

Maccabi Haifa

- Israel Super Cup: 2023

== See also ==
- List of Jewish footballers
- List of Jews in sports
- List of Israelis
