= Shareef Keouf =

Israeli Druze footballer

Personal information
- Date of birth: 25 June 2001 (age 25)
- Place of birth: Isfiya, Israel
- Height: 1.87 m (6 ft 1 1/2 in)
- Position: Goalkeeper

Team information
- Current team: Maccabi Haifa
- Number: 40

Youth career
- 2009–2010: Hapoel Isfiya
- 2010–2013: Ironi Nesher
- 2013–2020: Maccabi Haifa

Senior career*
Years	Team	Apps	(Gls)
2020–	Maccabi Haifa	74	(0)
2020–2021	→ Hapoel Kfar Shalem (loan)	21	(0)
2021–2023	→ Hapoel Afula (loan)	44	(0)

International career^{‡}
2016–2017	Israel U16	6	(0)
2017–2018	Israel U17	17	(0)
2018	Israel U18	2	(0)
2019	Israel U19	5	(0)
2022–	Israel U21	2	(0)
- * Club domestic league appearances and goals as of 23 June 2026 ‡ National team caps and goals as of 03:15, 1 December 2023 (UTC)

Shareef Keouf (Hebrew: שריף כיוף; born 25 June 2001) is an Israeli professional footballer who plays as a goalkeeper for Maccabi Haifa.

== Playing career ==
Keouf was born in Isfiya to a Druze family. He is a product of the youth academies of Hapoel Isfiya, Ironi Nesher, and Maccabi Haifa. On 19 June 2019, he signed his first professional contract with Maccabi Haifa for 5 seasons, and became their backup goalkeeper. On 5 November 2020, he began his senior career on loan with Hapoel Kfar Shalem in the Liga Leumit for the 2020–21 season. On 14 September 2021 he joined Hapoel Afula on loan for the 2021–22 season, and on 15 August 2022 had his loan extended for another season. The loan was cut short on 18 January 2023, and he returned to Maccabi Haifa to help out as their starting goalkeeper when Josh Cohen was injured.

On 16 April 2023, Keouf extended his contract with Maccabi Haifa until 2026. On 7 September 2023, he made his professional debut with Maccabi Haifa in a 1–1 Israeli Premier League tie with Bnei Sakhnin.

== International career ==
Keouf is a youth international for Israel. He was part of the Israel U21s for the 2023 UEFA European Under-21 Championship.

== See also ==
- List of Israeli Druze
