= Omer Korsia =

Israeli footballer (born 2002)

Personal information
- Date of birth: 7 October 2002 (age 24)
- Place of birth: Holon, Israel
- Height: 1.81 m (5 ft 11 in)
- Position: Defender

Team information
- Current team: Hapoel Kfar Shalem F.C.
- Number: 28

Youth career
- 2010–2015: Hapoel Rishon LeZion
- 2015–2020: Hapoel Tel Aviv

Senior career*
Years	Team	Apps	(Gls)
2020–2021	Hapoel Ramat HaSharon	6	(0)
2021–2022	Hapoel Petah Tikva	6	(0)
2022–2023	Enosis Neon Paralimni	20	(0)
2023–2024	Beitar Jerusalem	4	(0)
2024–2025	Maccabi Herzliya	35	(1)
2025–2026	Bnei Sakhnin FC	16	(0)
2026–	Hapoel Kfar Shalem	3	(0)

International career
2017	Israel U16	3	(0)
2019	Israel U18	1	(0)
- * Club domestic league appearances and goals as of 24 June 2026

Omer Korsia (Hebrew: עומר קורסיה; born 7 October 2002) is an Israeli professional footballer who plays as a defender for Liga Leumit club Hapoel Kfar Shalem.

== Club career ==
Korsia started is career in Hapoel Tel Aviv's youth team.

On 31 August 2022 signed for the Cypriot club Enosis Neon Paralimni.

On 17 July 2023, he returned to Israel and signed for Israeli Premier League club Beitar Jerusalem.

On 21 July 2024 signed for Maccabi Herzliya.
