= List of Azerbaijan football transfers winter 2023–24 =

This is a list of Azerbaijan football transfers in the winter transfer window, by club. Only clubs of the 2023–24 Azerbaijan Premier League are included.

== Azerbaijan Premier League 2023-24 ==
=== Araz-Naxçıvan ===
In: Note: Flags indicate national team as defined under FIFA eligibility rules; some limited exceptions apply. Players may hold more than one non-FIFA nationality.

No.	Pos.	Nation	Player
11	MF	(Azerbaijan) AZE	Ramin Nasirli (from (Azerbaijan) Neftçi)
17	MF	(Russia) RUS	Ildar Alekperov (on loan from (Azerbaijan) Sabah)

Out: Note: Flags indicate national team as defined under FIFA eligibility rules; some limited exceptions apply. Players may hold more than one non-FIFA nationality.

No.	Pos.	Nation	Player
5	DF	(Azerbaijan) AZE	Nihat Qurbanly (on loan to (Azerbaijan) MOIK)
11	FW	(Azerbaijan) AZE	Bayramali Qurbanov (on loan to (Azerbaijan) Difai Ağsu)

=== Gabala ===
In: Note: Flags indicate national team as defined under FIFA eligibility rules; some limited exceptions apply. Players may hold more than one non-FIFA nationality.

No.	Pos.	Nation	Player
10	FW	(Mozambique) MOZ	Clésio (from (Finland) Honka)

Out: Note: Flags indicate national team as defined under FIFA eligibility rules; some limited exceptions apply. Players may hold more than one non-FIFA nationality.

No.	Pos.	Nation	Player
10	MF	(Jordan) JOR	Omar Hani (to (Cyprus) Doxa Katokopias)

=== Kapaz ===
In: Note: Flags indicate national team as defined under FIFA eligibility rules; some limited exceptions apply. Players may hold more than one non-FIFA nationality.

No.	Pos.	Nation	Player
29	FW	(Azerbaijan) AZE	Amil Yunanov (on loan from (Azerbaijan) Sabail)
33	FW	(Azerbaijan) AZE	Jamal Jafarov (on loan from (Azerbaijan) Sabah)
47	MF	(Azerbaijan) AZE	Adilkhan Garahmadov (from (Azerbaijan) Iravan)

Out: Note: Flags indicate national team as defined under FIFA eligibility rules; some limited exceptions apply. Players may hold more than one non-FIFA nationality.

No.	Pos.	Nation	Player
19	FW	(Nigeria) NGA	Abdullahi Shuaibu
11	FW	(Azerbaijan) AZE	Elnur Jafarov (on loan to (Azerbaijan) Imishli)

=== Neftçi ===
In: Note: Flags indicate national team as defined under FIFA eligibility rules; some limited exceptions apply. Players may hold more than one non-FIFA nationality.

No.	Pos.	Nation	Player
20	FW	(Sierra Leone) SLE	Alpha Conteh (from (Bulgaria) Lokomotiv Plovdiv)
73	MF	(Azerbaijan) AZE	Ramin Nasirli (loan return from (Latvia) Daugavpils)
88	FW	(Colombia) COL	Brayan Moreno (from (Bulgaria) CSKA Sofia)

Out: Note: Flags indicate national team as defined under FIFA eligibility rules; some limited exceptions apply. Players may hold more than one non-FIFA nationality.

No.	Pos.	Nation	Player
5	MF	(United States) USA	Kenny Saief (to (Israel) Maccabi Haifa)
21	DF	(Azerbaijan) AZE	Ismayil Zulfugarli (loan to (Azerbaijan) Turan Tovuz)
25	FW	(Nigeria) NGA	Aaron Samuel Olanare
27	MF	(Azerbaijan) AZE	Farid Yusifli (loan to (Azerbaijan) Turan Tovuz)
73	MF	(Azerbaijan) AZE	Ramin Nasirli (to (Azerbaijan) Araz-Naxçıvan )

=== Qarabağ ===
In: Note: Flags indicate national team as defined under FIFA eligibility rules; some limited exceptions apply. Players may hold more than one non-FIFA nationality.

No.	Pos.	Nation	Player
24	MF	(Azerbaijan) AZE	Aleksey Isayev (from (Azerbaijan) Sabah)

Out: Note: Flags indicate national team as defined under FIFA eligibility rules; some limited exceptions apply. Players may hold more than one non-FIFA nationality.

No.	Pos.	Nation	Player
4	DF	(Azerbaijan) AZE	Rahil Mammadov (to (Poland) ŁKS Łódź)

=== Sabah ===
In: Note: Flags indicate national team as defined under FIFA eligibility rules; some limited exceptions apply. Players may hold more than one non-FIFA nationality.

No.	Pos.	Nation	Player
6	MF	(Azerbaijan) AZE	Abdulakh Khaybulayev (loan return from (Georgia (country)) Samtredia)

Out: Note: Flags indicate national team as defined under FIFA eligibility rules; some limited exceptions apply. Players may hold more than one non-FIFA nationality.

No.	Pos.	Nation	Player
10	MF	(Azerbaijan) AZE	Aleksey Isayev (to (Azerbaijan) Qarabağ)
21	MF	(Russia) RUS	Ildar Alekperov (on loan to (Azerbaijan) Araz-Naxçıvan)
29	MF	(Azerbaijan) AZE	Ceyhun Nuriyev (to (Azerbaijan) Zira)
33	FW	(Azerbaijan) AZE	Jamal Jafarov (on loan to (Azerbaijan) Kapaz)

=== Sabail ===
In: Note: Flags indicate national team as defined under FIFA eligibility rules; some limited exceptions apply. Players may hold more than one non-FIFA nationality.

No.	Pos.	Nation	Player
7	FW	(Guinea-Bissau) GNB	Madi Queta (from (Portugal) Mafra)
14	FW	(Netherlands) NED	Soulyman Allouch (from (Netherlands) VVV-Venlo)
77	FW	(Kenya) KEN	Ayub Masika (from (China) Nanjing City)

Out: Note: Flags indicate national team as defined under FIFA eligibility rules; some limited exceptions apply. Players may hold more than one non-FIFA nationality.

No.	Pos.	Nation	Player
9	FW	(Azerbaijan) AZE	Amil Yunanov (on loan to (Azerbaijan) Kapaz)

=== Sumgayit ===
In: Note: Flags indicate national team as defined under FIFA eligibility rules; some limited exceptions apply. Players may hold more than one non-FIFA nationality.

No.	Pos.	Nation	Player
23	MF	(Ecuador) ECU	Jordan Rezabala (from (Ecuador) Guayaquil City)

Out: Note: Flags indicate national team as defined under FIFA eligibility rules; some limited exceptions apply. Players may hold more than one non-FIFA nationality.

No.	Pos.	Nation	Player

=== Turan Tovuz ===
In: Note: Flags indicate national team as defined under FIFA eligibility rules; some limited exceptions apply. Players may hold more than one non-FIFA nationality.

No.	Pos.	Nation	Player
2	DF	(Azerbaijan) AZE	Ismayil Zulfugarli (on loan from (Azerbaijan) Neftchi)
8	MF	(Azerbaijan) AZE	Farid Yusifli (on loan from (Azerbaijan) Neftchi)
21	FW	(Brazil) BRA	Alex Souza (from (Lithuania) Hegelmann)

Out: Note: Flags indicate national team as defined under FIFA eligibility rules; some limited exceptions apply. Players may hold more than one non-FIFA nationality.

No.	Pos.	Nation	Player
2	DF	(Azerbaijan) AZE	Sertan Taşqın (to (Turkey) Manisa)
79	FW	(Bulgaria) BUL	Martin Petkov

=== Zira ===
In: Note: Flags indicate national team as defined under FIFA eligibility rules; some limited exceptions apply. Players may hold more than one non-FIFA nationality.

No.	Pos.	Nation	Player
23	FW	(Brazil) BRA	Raphael Utzig (from (South Korea) Chungnam Asan)
24	MF	(Paraguay) PAR	César Meza Colli (from (Saudi Arabia) Ohod Club)
29	MF	(Azerbaijan) AZE	Ceyhun Nuriyev (from (Azerbaijan) Sabah)

Out: Note: Flags indicate national team as defined under FIFA eligibility rules; some limited exceptions apply. Players may hold more than one non-FIFA nationality.

No.	Pos.	Nation	Player
23	MF	(Serbia) SRB	Andrija Lukovic (to (Serbia) Radnički Niš)
