= 2022–23 Neftçi PFK season =

Neftchi Baku
2022–23 season
- Manager: Laurențiu Reghecampf
- Stadium: Eighth Kilometer District Stadium
- Premier League: 3rd
- Azerbaijan Cup: Runners Up
- Europa Conference League: Third qualifying round vs Rapid Wien
- Top goalscorer: League: Emin Mahmudov (17); All: Emin Mahmudov (19)
Home colours	Away colours	Third colours

The Neftçi 2021–22 season was Neftçi's 31st Azerbaijan Premier League season. Neftchi will compete in the Azerbaijan Premier League, the Azerbaijan Cup and the UEFA Europa Conference League.

== Season events ==
On 10 June, Neftçi announced that Samir Abbasov had left his role as Head Coach after his contract expired, with Laurențiu Reghecampf being appointed as his replacement on 21 June.

On 23 June, Neftçi announced the signing of Ataa Jaber to a two-year contract, from Ashdod. The following day, 24 June, Neftçi announced the signing of Godsway Donyoh to a two-year contract, from Maccabi Haifa.

On 1 July, Neftçi announced the signing of Kenny Saief to a two-year contract from Anderlecht.

On 4 July, Neftçi announced the signing of Solomon Kvirkvelia from Gagra to a two-year contract.

On 20 July, Neftçi announced the signing of Yegor Bogomolsky to a three-year contract from Minsk.

On 8 August, Neftçi announced the signing of Vato Arveladze to a one-year contract, with the option of a second, from Fatih Karagümrük.

On 9 January, Neftçi announced the signing of Hojjat Haghverdi to an 18-month contract from Sumgayit.

On 19 January, Neftçi announced the signing of Keelan Lebon to an 18-month contract from Astana.

On 23 January, Neftçi announced that they had sold Godsway Donyoh to Apollon Limassol.

On 26 January, Neftçi announced the year-long loan signing of Saldanha from JEF United Chiba.

On 28 January, Yusuf Lawal left Neftçi to sign for Arouca.

On 15 February, Guilherme Pato left Neftçi by mutual agreement.

== Squad ==
As of match played 3 June 2023

No.	Name	Nationality	Position	Date of birth (age)	Signed from	Signed in	Contract ends	Apps.	Goals
Goalkeepers
1	Ivan Brkić	(Croatia)	GK	29 June 1995 (aged 27)	Riga	2022	2023	50	0
30	Agil Mammadov	(Azerbaijan)	GK	1 May 1989 (aged 34)	Gabala	2019	2022	111	0
93	Rza Jafarov	(Azerbaijan)	GK	3 July 2003 (aged 19)	Academy	2022		1	0
94	Alirza Mustabazada	(Azerbaijan)	GK	5 December 2001 (aged 21)	Academy	2022		1	0
Defenders
2	Mert Çelik	(Azerbaijan)	DF	10 June 2000 (aged 22)	loan from İstanbul Başakşehir	2020	2022	53	2
3	Hojjat Haghverdi	(Azerbaijan)	DF	3 February 1993 (aged 30)	Sumgayit	2023	2024	19	0
4	Solomon Kvirkvelia	(Georgia (country))	DF	6 February 1992 (aged 31)	Gagra	2022	2024	42	2
6	Vojislav Stanković	(Serbia)	DF	22 September 1987 (aged 35)	Gabala	2019	2022(+1)	126	8
19	Azer Salahlı	(Azerbaijan)	DF	11 April 1994 (aged 29)	Keşla	2021	2024	48	1
26	Omar Buludov	(Azerbaijan)	DF	15 December 1998 (aged 24)	Academy	2016	2024	133	5
41	Samir Gasanov	(Russia)	DF	10 April 2003 (aged 20)	Academy	2022		0	0
82	Rufat Abbasov	(Azerbaijan)	DF	1 January 2005 (aged 18)	Academy	2021		2	0
Midfielders
5	Kenny Saief	(United States)	MF	17 December 1993 (aged 29)	Anderlecht	2022	2024	41	8
7	Azer Aliyev	(Azerbaijan)	MF	12 May 1994 (aged 29)	Ufa	2022	2025	39	1
8	Emin Mahmudov	(Azerbaijan)	MF	27 April 1992 (aged 31)	Boavista	2017	2023	191	50
10	César Meza	(Paraguay)	MF	5 October 1991 (aged 31)	Keşla	2021	2023	55	6
14	Eddy	(Azerbaijan)	MF	2 August 1992 (aged 30)	Unattached	2022	2024	44	6
17	Rahman Hajiyev	(Azerbaijan)	MF	25 July 1993 (aged 29)	Baku	2014	2024	185	18
18	Vato Arveladze	(Georgia (country))	MF	4 March 1998 (aged 25)	Fatih Karagümrük	2022	2023 (+1)	20	0
20	Vusal Asgarov	(Azerbaijan)	MF	23 August 2001 (aged 21)	Academy	2018		15	1
21	Ismayil Zulfugarli	(Azerbaijan)	MF	16 April 2001 (aged 22)	Academy	2019		58	4
23	Ataa Jaber	(Israel)	MF	3 October 1994 (aged 28)	Ashdod	2022	2024	37	6
27	Farid Yusifli	(Azerbaijan)	MF	20 February 2002 (aged 21)	Academy	2019		36	0
92	Omar Gurbanov	(Azerbaijan)	MF	6 April 2005 (aged 18)	Academy	2022		1	0
Forwards
9	Saldanha	(Brazil)	FW	19 August 1999 (aged 23)	on loan from JEF United Chiba	2023	2023	20	5
22	Keelan Lebon	(France)	FW	4 July 1997 (aged 25)	Astana	2023	2024	20	4
77	Yegor Bogomolsky	(Belarus)	FW	3 June 2000 (aged 23)	Minsk	2022		32	4
91	Agadadash Salyanski	(Azerbaijan)	FW	19 June 2004 (aged 18)	Academy	2022		5	1
Away on loan
33	Turan Valizade	(Azerbaijan)	MF	1 January 2001 (aged 22)	Fenerbahçe	2019	2021	2	0
56	Elton Alibayli	(Azerbaijan)	DF	4 February 2000 (aged 23)	Academy	2019		1	0
73	Ramin Nasirli	(Azerbaijan)	MF	24 September 2002 (aged 20)	Academy	2021		5	1
Left during the season
3	Mamadou Mbodj	(Senegal)	DF	12 March 1993 (aged 30)	Žalgiris	2019	2023	94	9
11	Godsway Donyoh	(Ghana)	FW	14 October 1994 (aged 28)	Maccabi Haifa	2022	2024	21	5
16	Guilherme Pato	(Brazil)	FW	17 February 2001 (aged 22)	Internacional	2022	2024	32	2
24	Yusuf Lawal	(Nigeria)	MF	23 March 1998 (aged 25)	Lokeren	2020	2022 (+1)	88	7

== Transfers ==
=== In ===
Date	Position	Nationality	Name	From	Fee	Ref.
23 June 2022	MF	(Israel)	Ataa Jaber	Ashdod	Undisclosed	
24 June 2022	FW	(Ghana)	Godsway Donyoh	Maccabi Haifa	Undisclosed	
1 July 2022	MF	(United States)	Kenny Saief	Anderlecht	Undisclosed	
4 July 2022	DF	(Georgia (country))	Solomon Kvirkvelia	Gagra	Undisclosed	
20 July 2022	FW	(Belarus)	Yegor Bogomolsky	Minsk	Undisclosed	
8 August 2022	MF	(Georgia (country))	Vato Arveladze	Fatih Karagümrük	Undisclosed	
9 January 2023	DF	(Azerbaijan)	Hojjat Haghverdi	Sumgayit	Undisclosed	
19 January 2023	FW	(France)	Keelan Lebon	Astana	Free	

=== Loans in ===
Date from	Position	Nationality	Name	From	Date to	Ref.
26 January 2023	FW	(Brazil)	Saldanha	JEF United Chiba	31 December 2023	

=== Out ===
Date	Position	Nationality	Name	To	Fee	Ref.
23 January 2023	FW	(Ghana)	Godsway Donyoh	Apollon Limassol	Undisclosed	
28 January 2023	MF	(Nigeria)	Yusuf Lawal	Arouca	Undisclosed	

=== Loans out ===
Date from	Position	Nationality	Name	To	Date to	Ref.
1 July 2022	MF	(Azerbaijan)	Khayal Najafov	Turan Tovuz	End of season	
1 July 2022	MF	(Azerbaijan)	Turan Valizade	Turan Tovuz	End of season	
7 March 2023	MF	(Azerbaijan)	Ramin Nasirli	Daugavpils	31 December 2023	

=== Released ===
Date	Position	Nationality	Name	Joined	Date	Ref
19 December 2022	DF	(Senegal)	Mamadou Mbodj	Ordabasy	24 February 2023	
15 February 2023	FW	(Brazil)	Guilherme Pato	Figueirense	23 February 2023	
22 June 2023	MF	(Georgia (country))	Vato Arveladze	Dinamo Tbilisi	16 August 2023	
22 June 2023	MF	(Paraguay)	César Meza Colli	Ohod Club	21 June 2023	

== Friendlies ==
9 January 2023	Vasas (Hungary)	1 – 1	(Azerbaijan) Neftçi	Antalya, Turkey
18:00 AZT (UTC+4)	Saief 24'	Report	Zimonyi 67'	Stadium: Gloria Golf Club

15 January 2023	Miedź Legnica (Poland)	2 – 1	(Azerbaijan) Neftçi	Antalya, Turkey
12:30 AZT (UTC+4)	Henríquez 49', 53'		A.Salyanski 15'	Stadium: Gloria Golf Club

15 January 2023	TSC Bačka Topola (Serbia)	Canceled	(Azerbaijan) Neftçi	Antalya, Turkey
AZT (UTC+4)		Report		Stadium: Gloria Golf Club

19 January 2023	Red Star Belgrade (Serbia)	1 – 0	(Azerbaijan) Neftçi	Antalya, Turkey
AZT (UTC+4)	Motika 4'	Report		Stadium: Gloria Golf Club

10 January 2023	Vasas (Hungary)	1 – 1	(Azerbaijan) Neftçi	Belek, Turkey
18:00 AZT (UTC+4)	Zimonyi 67'	Report	Saief 24'

15 January 2023	Miedź Legnica (Poland)	2 – 1	(Azerbaijan) Neftçi	Belek, Turkey
12:30 AZT (UTC+4)	Henríquez 49', 53' (pen.)	Report	A.Salyanski 15'

18 January 2023	Red Star Belgrade (Serbia)	1 – 0	(Azerbaijan) Neftçi	Belek, Turkey
18:00 AZT (UTC+4)	Motika 4'	Report

== Competitions ==
=== Overview ===
Competition	First match	Last match	Starting round	Final position	Record							
Competition	First match	Last match	Starting round	Final position	Pld	W	D	L	GF	GA	GD	Win %
Premier League	7 August 2022	28 May 2023	Matchday 1	3rd	36	20	8	8	63	39	+24	55.56
Azerbaijan Cup	8 December 2022	3 June 2023	Quarterfinal	Runners Up	5	2	0	3	5	4	+1	40.00
UEFA Europa Conference League	21 July 2022	11 August 2022	Second qualifying round	Third qualifying round	4	2	0	2	5	5	+0	50.00
Total					45	24	8	13	73	48	+25	53.33

Last updated: 3 June 2023
Source: Competitions

=== Premier League ===
==== Results summary ====
Overall								Home						Away					
Pld	W	D	L	GF	GA	GD	Pts	W	D	L	GF	GA	GD	W	D	L	GF	GA	GD
36	20	8	8	63	38	+25	68	11	3	4	37	20	+17	9	5	4	26	18	+8

Last updated: 28 May 2023.
Source: See Results

==== Results by round ====
Round	1	2	3	4	5	6	7	8	9	10	11	12	13	14	15	16	17	18	19	20	21	22	23	24	25	26	27	28	29	30	31	32	33	34	35	36
Ground	A	H	A	H	H	A	A	A	H	A	H	A	A	H	H	H	A	H	A	H	H	A	H	A	H	A	H	A	A	H	A	H	A	H	A	H
Result	W	W	L	W	W	W	W	L	D	W	L	W	D	W	W	L	W	W	L	W	W	D	W	D	W	W	D	D	W	L	D	L	L	D	W	W
Position	5	2	4	4	3	2	2	3	3	3	3	3	3	3	3	3	3	3	3	3	3	3	3	3	3	3	3	3	3	3	3	3	3	3	3	3

Updated to match(es) played on 28 May 2023. Source: See Results
A = Away; H = Home; W = Win; D = Draw; L = Loss

==== Results ====
7 August 2022 1	Shamakhi	0 – 1	Neftçi	Shamakhi
17:00 AZT (UTC+4)	Haziyev (yellow card) 50'; Mustafayev (yellow card) 74'; Hüseynli (yellow card) 90+9'	Report	Yusifli (yellow card) 75'; Mahmudov 81'	Stadium: City Stadium; Referee: Kamal Umudlu

14 August 2022 2	Neftçi	5 – 2	Kapaz	Baku
20:30 AZT (UTC+4)	Kvirkvelia 11'; Donyoh 12'; Saief 15'; Eddy 51'; Bogomolsky 89'	Report	Shuaibu 57'; Suleymanov 90+3'	Stadium: Bakcell Arena; Referee: Nicat İsmayıllı

20 August 2022 3	Sabah	2 – 1	Neftçi	Masazır
20:30 AZT (UTC+4)	Letić (yellow card) 35'; Isayev 78' (pen.) (yellow card) 81'; Ba (yellow card) 82'; Apeh 90+1' (pen.); Nuriyev (yellow card) 90+2'	Report	Kvirkvelia (yellow card) 36'; Lawal 45+1'; Stanković (yellow card) 82'; Eddy (yellow card) 84'	Stadium: Bank Respublika Arena; Referee: Farid Haciyev

26 August 2022 4	Neftçi	2 – 1	Zira	Baku
20:30 AZT (UTC+4)	Donyoh 14'; Mammadov (yellow card) 57'; Aliyev 79'; Stanković (yellow card) 88'; Arveladze (yellow card) 90+3'	Report	Keyta 56' (pen.) (yellow card) 86'; Hajili (yellow card) 81'	Stadium: Bakcell Arena; Referee: Elcin Masiyev

3 September 2022 5	Neftçi	3 – 0	Sumgayit	Baku
20:30 AZT (UTC+4)	Lawal (yellow card) 16'; Jaber 19'; Eddy (yellow card) 42'; Mahmudov 55' (pen.); Hajiyev 77'	Report	Pereira (yellow card) 16'; Abdullazade (yellow card) 60'	Stadium: Bakcell Arena; Referee: Kamal Umudlu

10 September 2022 6	Gabala	1 – 2	Neftçi	Qabala
18:00 AZT (UTC+4)	Isayev 32'; Qirtimov (yellow card) 82'	Report	Mahmudov (yellow card) 22'; Jaber 46', 53'; Eddy (yellow card) 86'; Hajiyev (yellow card) 88'; Mammadov (yellow card) 90+3'	Stadium: City Stadium; Referee: Ravan Hamzazada

16 September 2022 7	Sabail	0 – 2	Neftçi	Baku
20:30 AZT (UTC+4)	França (yellow card) 70'	Report	Yusifli (yellow card) 11'; Mahmudov 53'; Pato 83'	Stadium: Bayil Arena; Referee: Aliyar Agayev

1 October 2022 8	Qarabağ	3 – 1	Neftçi	Baku
18:00 AZT (UTC+4)	Kady 56'; Zoubir 68'; Kwabena 74'; Magomedaliyev (yellow card) 90+2'	Report	Eddy 24'; Stanković (yellow card) 90+2'	Stadium: Azersun Arena; Referee: Ravan Hamzazada

8 October 2022 9	Neftçi	0 – 0	Turan Tovuz	Baku
19:30 AZT (UTC+4)	Buludov (yellow card) 5'; Saief (yellow card) 90+8'	Report	Okebugwu (yellow card) 26'; Valizade (yellow card) 42'; Oduwa (yellow card) 79'; Rzayev (yellow card) 90'	Stadium: Azersun Arena; Referee: Ingilab Mammadov

16 October 2022 10	Kapaz	0 – 2	Neftçi	Ganja
15:00 AZT (UTC+4)	Kantaria (yellow card) 51'; Aliyev (red card) 62'	Report	Mahmudov 17'; Mbodj (yellow card) 31'; Yusifli (yellow card) 34'; Donyoh (yellow card) 43'; Saief (yellow card) 62' (goal) 82'; Hajiyev (yellow card) 90+2'	Stadium: Ganja City; Referee: Tural Qurbanov

23 October 2022 11	Neftçi	2 – 3	Sabah	Baku
18:30 AZT (UTC+4)	Buludov 71'; Zulfugarli (red card) 75'; Stanković (yellow card) 80'; Mahmudov 83' (pen.); Saief (yellow card) 84'	Report	Ba (yellow card) 33'; Mickels 37'; Apeh 45+6'; Isayev (yellow card) 49' (goal) 52'; Seydiyev (yellow card) 63'	Stadium: Azersun Arena; Referee: Kamal Umudlu

29 October 2022 12	Zira	0 – 3	Neftçi	Zirə
17:30 AZT (UTC+4)	Khalilzade (yellow card) 58'	Report	Bogomolsky 6' (yellow card) 46'; Donyoh 75'; Mahmudov 83'	Stadium: Zira Olympic Sport Complex Stadium; Referee: Aliyar Agayev

5 November 2022 13	Sumgayit	2 – 2	Neftçi	Sumgait
20:00 AZT (UTC+4)	Gadze 41'; Khachayev 61'; Isgandarli (yellow card) 62'; Daničić (yellow card) 70'; Bayramov (yellow card) 90+7'	Report	Donyoh 47'; Kvirkvelia (yellow card) 57'; Jaber 87'	Stadium: Kapital Bank Arena; Referee: Javid Jalilov

12 November 2022 14	Neftçi	2 – 0	Gabala	Baku
17:30 AZT (UTC+4)	Saief (yellow card) 21' (goal) 24'; Mbodj (yellow card) 45+1'; Hajiyev 76'	Report	Abu Akel (yellow card) 48'; Felipe (yellow card) 61'; Ruan (yellow card) 63'; Qirtimov (yellow card) 85'	Stadium: Bakcell Arena; Referee: Nicat İsmayıllı

27 November 2022 15	Neftçi	3 – 1	Sabail	Baku
17:00 AZT (UTC+4)	Mahmudov 27', 51' (pen.), 77' (pen.); Pato (yellow card) 32'	Report	Kizito (yellow card) 43'; Maharramli 63'; Chekh (yellow card) 74'; Stasyuk (yellow card) 75'; França (yellow card) 82'	Stadium: Bakcell Arena; Referee: Farid Haciyev

2 December 2022 16	Neftçi	0 – 4	Qarabağ	Baku
21:00 AZT (UTC+4)	Eddy (yellow card) 66'; Jaber (yellow card) 71'	Report	Kady 37', 83'; Zoubir 60'; Sheydayev 67'; Medina (yellow card) 79'	Stadium: Bakcell Arena; Referee: Elcin Masiyev

15 December 2022 17	Turan Tovuz	0 – 1	Neftçi	Tovuz
14:30 AZT (UTC+4)	Marakvelidze (yellow card) 45+4'; Ahmadli (yellow card) 90'; Guliyev (yellow card) 90+5'	Report	Bogomolsky (yellow card) 31'; Buludov (yellow card) 45'; Salahlı (yellow card) 49'; Mahmudov 73' (pen.); Brkić (yellow card) 90+4'	Stadium: City Stadium; Referee: Aliyar Agayev

23 December 2022 18	Neftçi	3 – 0	Shamakhi	Baku
16:00 AZT (UTC+4)	Zulfugarli 41'; Bayramov 52' (o.g.); Çelik (yellow card) 84'; Salyanski 89'; Jaber (yellow card) 90+2'	Report	Safarov (yellow card) 17'; Qasımov (yellow card) 73'; N.Guliyev (yellow card) 84'	Stadium: Bakcell Arena; Referee: Raad Ahamadov

26 January 2023 19	Sabah	2 – 0	Neftçi	Masazır
19:00 AZT (UTC+4)	Mickels 7' (pen.); Kashchuk 37'	Report	Jaber (yellow card) 21'; Mahmudov (yellow card) 78'	Stadium: Bank Respublika Arena; Referee: Aliyar Agayev

1 February 2023 20	Neftçi	1 – 0	Zira	Baku
17:30 AZT (UTC+4)	Saldanha (yellow card) 28'; Stanković 52'; Saief (yellow card) 88'	Report	Guerrier (yellow card) 62' (yellow-red card) 75'; Chantakias (yellow card) 71'; Hajili (yellow card) 90+5'	Stadium: Bakcell Arena; Referee: Raad Ahmadov

5 February 2023 21	Neftçi	2 – 0	Sumgayit	Baku
18:30 AZT (UTC+4)	Lebon (yellow card) 39'; Aliyev (yellow card) 43'; Mahmudov (yellow card) 45'; Kvirkvelia 54'; Saldanha 64'	Report	Mustafayev (yellow card) 34'; Tisdell (yellow card) 43'	Stadium: Bakcell Arena; Referee: Elcin Masiyev

10 February 2023 22	Gabala	0 – 0	Neftçi	Qabala
15:00 AZT (UTC+4)	Abu Akel (yellow card) 40'; Felipe (yellow card) 46'	Report		Stadium: City Stadium; Referee: Farid Haciyev

18 February 2023 23	Neftçi	3 – 0	Sabail	Baku
17:30 AZT (UTC+4)	Aliyev (yellow card) 6'; Saief 8' (pen.); Mahmudov 48' (pen.); Saldanha 74'; Eddy (yellow card) 77'	Report	Taghiyev (yellow card) 45'; França (yellow card) 45+3'; Balayev (yellow card) 47'; Zakpa (yellow card) 72'	Stadium: Bakcell Arena; Referee: Kamranbay Rahimov

27 February 2023 24	Qarabağ	1 – 1	Neftçi	Baku
20:00 AZT (UTC+4)	Medina (yellow card) 32'; Mammadov (yellow card) 54'; Haghverdi 82' (o.g.); Romão (yellow card) 85'	Report	Eddy (yellow card) 21'; Lebon 33'; Jaber (yellow card) 79'; Stanković (yellow card) 85'	Stadium: Azersun Arena; Referee: Raad Ahmədov

5 March 2023 25	Neftçi	4 – 0	Turan Tovuz	Baku
19:30 AZT (UTC+4)	Meza 20'; Mahmudov 24', 83'; Saldanha 72'	Report	Marandici (yellow card) 55'	Stadium: Bakcell Arena; Referee: Ravan Hamzazada

12 March 2023 26	Shamakhi	0 – 1	Neftçi	Shamakhi
15:00 AZT (UTC+4)		Report	Haghverdi (yellow card) 21'; Arveladze (yellow card) 56'; Eddy (yellow card) 62'; Saldanha 81'	Stadium: City Stadium; Referee: Farid Haciyev

16 March 2023 27	Neftçi	2 – 2	Kapaz	Baku
19:00 AZT (UTC+4)	Mahmudov 65'; Eddy 72'; Lebon (yellow card) 76'	Report	Y.Nabiyev 57'; Cissé 73'; F.Nabiyev (yellow card) 76'	Stadium: Bakcell Arena; Referee: Elcin Masiyev

1 April 2023 28	Zira	1 – 1	Neftçi	Zirə
19:30 AZT (UTC+4)	Saief 70' (o.g.); Akhmedzade (yellow card) 73'	Report	Lebon 12'	Stadium: Zira Olympic Sport Complex Stadium; Referee: Nicat İsmayıllı

8 April 2023 29	Sumgayit	0 – 4	Neftçi	Sumgait
20:00 AZT (UTC+4)	Abdullazade (yellow card) 22'; Isgandarli (yellow card) 29'	Report	Stanković 8'; Haghverdi (yellow card) 40'; Saldanha (yellow card) 49'; Meza 64'; Zulfugarli 83'; Lebon 85'; Saief (yellow card) 90+1'	Stadium: Kapital Bank Arena; Referee: Rauf Allahverdiyev

14 April 2023 30	Neftçi	1 – 2	Gabala	Baku
20:00 AZT (UTC+4)	Yusifli (yellow card) 28'; Kvirkvelia (yellow card) 59'; Mahmudov 61' (pen.)	Report	Ramon 13'; Muradov (yellow card) 18'; Alimi 24' (pen.) (yellow card) 68'; Ruan (yellow card) 59'; Ağayev (yellow card) 69'; Qirtimov (yellow card) 90+6'	Stadium: Bakcell Arena; Referee: Kamranbay Rahimov

22 April 2023 31	Sabail	1 – 1	Neftçi	Baku
18:30 AZT (UTC+4)	Ramazanov (yellow card) 2'; Tagiyev (yellow card) 23'; Chekh 31'; Gomis (yellow card) 39'; Naghiyev (yellow card) 86'	Report	Bogomolsky 7'; Arveladze (yellow card) 31'; Saldanha (yellow card) 86'; Buludov (yellow card) 87'	Stadium: Bayil Arena; Referee: Ravan Hamzazada

2 May 2023 32	Neftçi	2 – 4	Qarabağ	Baku
20:00 AZT (UTC+4)	Stanković (red card) 31'; Saldanha 40'; Mahmudov 64' (pen.); Jaber (yellow card) 90+2'	Report	Sheydayev 11'; Andrade 16'; Saldanha 55' (o.g.); Magomedaliyev (yellow card) 64'; Zoubir 80'	Stadium: Bakcell Arena; Referee: Ingilab Mammadov

7 May 2023 33	Turan Tovuz	4 – 0	Neftçi	Tovuz
15:00 AZT (UTC+4)	Aliyev (yellow card) 14'; Wankewai 17', 44', 61'; Miller 21'; Hajiyev (yellow card) 49'; Pusi (yellow card) 90+4'; Turabov (yellow card) 90+4'	Report	Jaber (yellow card) 45+3'; Arveladze (yellow card) 82'; Yusifli (yellow card) 90+4'; Çelik (yellow card) 90+4'	Stadium: City Stadium; Referee: Kamal Umudlu

14 May 2023 34	Neftçi	1 – 1	Shamakhi	Baku
20:30 AZT (UTC+4)	Azizli 12' (o.g.); Eddy (yellow card) 31'; Saief (yellow card) 88'	Report	Yunanov 56' (pen.); Agjabayov (yellow card) 88'; Hüseynli (yellow card) 90'	Stadium: Bakcell Arena; Referee: Aliyar Ağayev

21 May 2023 35	Kapaz	1 – 3	Neftçi	Ganja
18:00 AZT (UTC+4)	Shuaibu 45+3'; Khvalko (yellow card) 82'; Y.Nabiyev (yellow card) 84'	Report	Çelik (yellow card) 59'; Jaber 65'; Meza (yellow card) 74'; Buludov 87'; Lebon (yellow card) 89' (goal) 90+4'	Stadium: Ganja City; Referee: Kamran Aliyev

28 May 2023 36	Neftçi	1 – 0	Sabah	Baku
17:00 AZT (UTC+4)	Mahmudov 9'; Jaber (yellow card) 32'; Saief (yellow card) 63'; Eddy (yellow card) 84'	Report	Ba (yellow card) 90+5'	Stadium: Bakcell Arena; Referee: Ravan Hamzazada

==== League table ====
Pos	Team	Pld	W	D	L	GF	GA	GD	Pts	Qualification
1	Qarabağ (C)	36	28	6	2	91	25	+66	90	Qualification for the Champions League first qualifying round
2	Sabah	36	25	6	5	75	24	+51	81	Qualification to Europa Conference League second qualifying round
3	Neftçi	36	20	8	8	63	38	+25	68	Qualification to Europa Conference League second qualifying round
4	Gabala	36	13	11	12	47	47	0	50	Qualification to Europa Conference League second qualifying round
5	Zira	36	13	11	12	45	46	−1	50	

Source: Soccerway
Rules for classification: 1) Points; 2) Head-to-head points; 3) Head-to-head goal difference; 4) Head-to-head goals scored; 5) Head-to-head away goals scored (only if two teams); 6) Goal difference; 7) Goals scored.
(C) Champions

=== Azerbaijan Cup ===
8 December 2022 Quarterfinal 1st leg	Zira	1 – 0	Neftçi	Zirə
20:30 AZT (UTC+4)	Hajili (yellow card) 46'; Muradov (yellow card) 49'; Sadykhov 54'; Alıyev (yellow card) 83'	Report	Jaber (yellow card) 75'	Stadium: Zira Olympic Sport Complex Stadium; Referee: Ravan Hamzazade

20 December 2022 Quarterfinal 2nd leg	Neftçi	3 – 1 (a.e.t.) (3 – 2 agg.)	Zira	Baku
19:00 AZT (UTC+4)	Bogomolsky 3'; Mahmudov 45+1'; Eddy (yellow card) 54'; Arveladze (yellow card) 60'; Saief 95'; Pato (yellow card) 101'; Brkić (yellow card) 105+2'; Asgarov (yellow card) 115'; Jafarov (yellow card) 116'	Report	Alkhasov (yellow card) 27'; Khalilzade (yellow card) 72' (yellow-red card) 120+1'; Brogno 89'; Keyta (penalty missed) 110'; Hajili (yellow card) 120+1' (yellow-red card) 120+2'	Stadium: Bakcell Arena; Referee: Javid Jalilov

19 April 2023 Semifinal 1st leg	Turan Tovuz	1 – 0	Neftçi	Tovuz
16:00 AZT (UTC+4)	Xulu (yellow card) 18'; Najafov (yellow card) 55'; Aliyev (yellow card) 62'; Marandici 74'; Bayramov (yellow card) 90+4'	Report	Stanković (yellow card) 7'; Eddy (yellow card) 30'; Mahmudov (yellow card) 79'	Stadium: City Stadium; Attendance: 5,000; Referee: Rashad Ahmadov

26 April 2023 Semifinal 2nd leg	Neftçi	2 – 0 (2 – 1 agg.)	Turan Tovuz	Baku
20:00 AZT (UTC+4)	Saldanha (yellow card) 56'; Mammadov (yellow card) 81'; Buludov (yellow card) 83'; Mahmudov 90+2'; Saief 90+8'	Report		Stadium: Bakcell Arena; Attendance: 5,000; Referee: Farid Hajiyev

==== Final ====
3 June 2023	Neftçi	0 – 1 (a.e.t.)	Gabala	Baku
20:00 AZT (UTC+4)	Eddy (yellow card) 65'; Kvirkvelia (yellow card) 65'; Haghverdi (yellow card) 108'	Report	Isayev (yellow card) 65'; Allach (yellow card) 65'; Alimi 102' (yellow card) 120'	Stadium: Bakcell Arena; Referee: Inqilab Mammadov

=== UEFA Europa Conference League ===
==== Qualifying phase ====
21 July 2022 Second qualifying round 1st leg	Aris Limassol (Cyprus)	2 – 0	(Azerbaijan) Neftçi	Larnaca, Cyprus
21:30 AZT (UTC+4)	Brorsson (yellow card) 24'; Caju 53'; Gomis 66'	Report	Saief (yellow card) 31'; Donyoh (yellow card) 82'	Stadium: AEK Arena – Georgios Karapatakis; Attendance: 1,371; Referee: Ivan Bebek (Croatia)
Note: Aris Limassol played their home match at the AEK Arena – Georgios Karapatakis in Larnaca, instead of their regular venue Tsirio Stadium, in Limassol, which did not meet UEFA requirements.

28 July 2022 Second qualifying round 2nd leg	Neftçi (Azerbaijan)	3 – 0 (3 – 2 agg.)	(Cyprus) Aris Limassol	Baku, Azerbaijan
21:00 AZT (UTC+4)	Salahlı (yellow card) 25'; Stanković (yellow card) 32'; Donyoh 38'; Eddy 57'; Saief 62'; Brkić (yellow card) 83'; Lawal (yellow card) 90+2'; Yusifli (yellow card) 90+2'	Report	Szöke (yellow card) 4'; Brorsson (yellow card) 6'; Brown (yellow card) 40' (yellow-red card) 82'; Delmiro (yellow card) 59'; Dede-Lhomme (yellow card) 90+7'	Stadium: Bakcell Arena; Attendance: 9,500; Referee: Bastian Dankert (Germany)

4 August 2022 Third qualifying round 1st leg	Neftçi (Azerbaijan)	2 – 1	(Austria) Rapid Wien	Baku, Azerbaijan
21:00 AZT (UTC+4)	Jaber (yellow card) 43' (goal) 44'; Saief 60'	Report	Pejić (yellow card) 35'; Grüll (yellow card) 35'; Schick (yellow card) 88'; Burgstaller 90+5'	Stadium: Bakcell Arena; Attendance: 9,800; Referee: Dario Bel (Croatia)

11 August 2022 Third qualifying round 2nd leg	Rapid Wien (Austria)	2 – 0 (a.e.t.) (3 – 2 agg.)	(Azerbaijan) Neftçi	Vienna, Austria
22:30 AZT (UTC+4)	Grüll 66'; Sattlberger (yellow card) 90'; Koscelník (yellow card) 105+2'; Druijf 112'; Oswald (yellow card) 117'	Report	Jaber (yellow card) 36'; Çelik (yellow card) 64'; Donyoh (yellow card) 111'; Eddy (yellow card) 115'; Yusifli (yellow card) 117'	Stadium: Allianz Stadion; Attendance: 14,200; Referee: Rohit Saggi (Norway)

== Squad statistics ==
As of match played 3 June 2023

=== Appearances and goals ===
No.	Pos	Nat	Player	Total		Premier League		Azerbaijan Cup		UEFA Europa Conference League	
No.	Pos	Nat	Player	Apps	Goals	Apps	Goals	Apps	Goals	Apps	Goals
1	GK	(Croatia) CRO	Ivan Brkić	35	0	26	0	5	0	4	0
2	DF	(Azerbaijan) AZE	Mert Çelik	16	0	5+7	0	1+2	0	0+1	0
3	DF	(Azerbaijan) AZE	Hojjat Haghverdi	18	0	15+1	0	1+1	0	0	0
4	DF	(Georgia (country)) GEO	Solomon Kvirkvelia	42	2	29+4	2	5	0	4	0
5	MF	(United States) USA	Kenny Saief	41	8	31+1	4	5	2	4	2
6	DF	(Serbia) SRB	Vojislav Stanković	37	2	29	2	4	0	4	0
7	MF	(Azerbaijan) AZE	Azer Aliyev	25	1	21	1	1+1	0	0+2	0
8	MF	(Azerbaijan) AZE	Emin Mahmudov	45	19	33+3	17	5	2	4	0
9	FW	(Brazil) BRA	Saldanha	20	5	15+2	5	3	0	0	0
10	MF	(Paraguay) PAR	César Meza	20	2	7+10	2	1+2	0	0	0
14	MF	(Azerbaijan) AZE	Eddy	29	4	18+3	3	4	0	4	1
17	MF	(Azerbaijan) AZE	Rahman Hajiyev	19	2	4+11	2	0	0	0+4	0
18	MF	(Georgia (country)) GEO	Vato Arveladze	20	0	2+16	0	0+2	0	0	0
19	DF	(Azerbaijan) AZE	Azər Salahlı	31	0	15+8	0	3+1	0	4	0
20	MF	(Azerbaijan) AZE	Vusal Asgarov	3	0	1+1	0	0+1	0	0	0
21	MF	(Azerbaijan) AZE	Ismayil Zulfugarli	29	2	11+14	2	2+1	0	0+1	0
22	FW	(France) FRA	Keelan Lebon	20	4	17	4	3	0	0	0
23	MF	(Israel) ISR	Ataa Jaber	37	6	26+2	5	4+1	0	4	1
26	DF	(Azerbaijan) AZE	Omar Buludov	37	2	19+11	2	2+2	0	0+3	0
27	MF	(Azerbaijan) AZE	Farid Yusifli	25	0	10+9	0	1+1	0	0+4	0
30	GK	(Azerbaijan) AZE	Agil Mammadov	9	0	9	0	0	0	0	0
77	FW	(Belarus) BLR	Yegor Bogomolsky	32	4	10+17	3	1+3	1	0+1	0
82	DF	(Azerbaijan) AZE	Rufat Abbasov	1	0	1	0	0	0	0	0
91	FW	(Azerbaijan) AZE	Agadadash Salyanski	5	1	0+4	1	0+1	0	0	0
92	MF	(Azerbaijan) AZE	Omar Gurbanov	1	0	0+1	0	0	0	0	0
93	GK	(Azerbaijan) AZE	Rza Jafarov	1	0	1	0	0	0	0	0
94	GK	(Azerbaijan) AZE	Alirza Mustabazada	1	0	0+1	0	0	0	0	0
Players away on loan:
73	MF	(Azerbaijan) AZE	Ramin Nasirli	1	0	0+1	0	0	0	0	0
Players who left Neftçi during the season:
3	DF	(Senegal) SEN	Mamadou Mbodj	14	0	7+3	0	0	0	4	0
11	FW	(Ghana) GHA	Godsway Donyoh	21	5	15	4	2	0	4	1
16	FW	(Brazil) BRA	Guilherme Pato	17	1	2+10	1	0+2	0	0+3	0
24	MF	(Nigeria) NGR	Yusuf Lawal	24	1	17+1	1	2	0	4	0

=== Goal scorers ===
Place	Position	Nation	Number	Name	Premier League	Azerbaijan Cup	UEFA Europa Conference League	Total
1	MF	(Azerbaijan)	8	Emin Mahmudov	17	2	0	19
2	MF	(United States)	5	Kenny Saief	4	2	2	8
3	MF	(Israel)	23	Ataa Jaber	5	0	1	6
4	FW	(Brazil)	9	Saldanha	5	0	0	5
4	FW	(Ghana)	11	Godsway Donyoh	4	0	1	5
6	FW	(France)	22	Keelan Lebon	4	0	0	4
6	FW	(Belarus)	77	Yegor Bogomolsky	3	1	0	4
6	MF	(Azerbaijan)	14	Eddy Pascual	3	0	1	4
9	MF	(Azerbaijan)	17	Rahman Hajiyev	2	0	0	2
9	DF	(Georgia (country))	4	Solomon Kvirkvelia	2	0	0	2
9	DF	(Serbia)	6	Vojislav Stanković	2	0	0	2
9	MF	(Paraguay)	10	César Meza	2	0	0	2
9	MF	(Azerbaijan)	21	Ismayil Zulfugarli	2	0	0	2
9	DF	(Azerbaijan)	26	Omar Buludov	2	0	0	2
9				Own goal	2	0	0	2
16	MF	(Nigeria)	24	Yusuf Lawal	1	0	0	1
16	MF	(Azerbaijan)	7	Azer Aliyev	1	0	0	1
16	MF	(Brazil)	16	Guilherme Pato	1	0	0	1
16	FW	(Azerbaijan)	91	Agadadash Salyanski	1	0	0	1
				TOTALS	63	5	5	73

=== Clean sheets ===
Place	Position	Nation	Number	Name	Premier League	Azerbaijan Cup	UEFA Europa Conference League	Total
1	GK	(Croatia)	1	Ivan Brkić	13	1	0	14
2	GK	(Azerbaijan)	30	Agil Mammadov	4	0	0	4
3	GK	(Azerbaijan)	94	Alirza Mushtabazade	1	0	0	1
				TOTALS	17	1	0	18

Agil Mammadov & Alirza Mustabazada both played in Neftçi's 1-0 victory over Shamakhi on 7 August 2022

=== Disciplinary record ===
Number	Nation	Position	Name	Premier League		Azerbaijan Cup		UEFA Europa Conference League		Total	
Number	Nation	Position	Name	Yellow card	Red card	Yellow card	Red card	Yellow card	Red card	Yellow card	Red card
1	(Croatia)	GK	Ivan Brkić	1	0	1	0	1	0	3	0
2	(Azerbaijan)	DF	Mert Çelik	3	0	0	0	1	0	4	0
3	(Azerbaijan)	DF	Hojjat Haghverdi	2	0	1	0	0	0	3	0
4	(Georgia (country))	DF	Solomon Kvirkvelia	3	0	1	0	0	0	4	0
5	(United States)	MF	Kenny Saief	8	0	0	0	1	0	9	0
6	(Serbia)	DF	Vojislav Stanković	5	1	1	0	1	0	7	1
7	(Azerbaijan)	MF	Azer Aliyev	2	0	0	0	0	0	2	0
8	(Azerbaijan)	MF	Emin Mahmudov	3	0	1	0	0	0	4	0
9	(Brazil)	FW	Saldanha	3	0	1	0	0	0	4	0
10	(Paraguay)	MF	César Meza	1	0	0	0	0	0	1	0
14	(Azerbaijan)	MF	Eddy Pascual	9	0	3	0	1	0	13	0
17	(Azerbaijan)	MF	Rahman Hajiyev	2	0	0	0	0	0	2	0
18	(Georgia (country))	MF	Vato Arveladze	4	0	1	0	0	0	5	0
19	(Azerbaijan)	DF	Azər Salahlı	1	0	0	0	1	0	2	0
20	(Azerbaijan)	MF	Vusal Asgarov	0	0	1	0	0	0	1	0
21	(Azerbaijan)	MF	Ismayil Zulfugarli	0	1	0	0	0	0	0	1
22	(France)	FW	Keelan Lebon	3	0	0	0	0	0	3	0
23	(Israel)	MF	Ataa Jaber	7	0	1	0	2	0	10	0
26	(Azerbaijan)	DF	Omar Buludov	3	0	1	0	0	0	4	0
27	(Azerbaijan)	MF	Farid Yusifli	5	0	0	0	2	0	7	0
30	(Azerbaijan)	GK	Agil Mammadov	2	0	1	0	0	0	3	0
77	(Belarus)	FW	Yegor Bogomolsky	2	0	0	0	0	0	2	0
93	(Azerbaijan)	GK	Rza Jafarov	0	0	1	0	0	0	1	0
Players who left Neftçi during the season:
3	(Senegal)	DF	Mamadou Mbodj	2	0	0	0	0	0	2	0
11	(Ghana)	FW	Godsway Donyoh	1	0	0	0	2	0	3	0
16	(Brazil)	FW	Guilherme Pato	1	0	1	0	0	0	2	0
24	(Nigeria)	MF	Yusuf Lawal	1	0	0	0	1	0	2	0
			TOTALS	74	2	16	0	13	0	103	2
