= 2024–25 Maccabi Haifa F.C. season =

Football season

Maccabi Haifa
2024–25 season
- President: Ya'akov Shahar
- Head coach: Itay Mordechai
- Stadium: Sammy Ofer
- Ligat Ha'Al: 3rd
- State Cup: Quarter-finals
- Toto Cup: Runners-up
- Conference League: Second qualifying round
- Top goalscorer: League: Dia Saba (16); All: Dia Saba (19)
- Highest home attendance: 28,650 vs Hapoel Be'er Sheva (25 July 2024)
- Lowest home attendance: 270 vs Sabah FC (4 December 2024)
- Average home league attendance: 22,953
| Home colours | Away colours | Third colours |
- All statistics correct as of 18 June 2024.

The 2024–25 season is Maccabi Haifa's 67th season in the Israeli Premier League, and their 43rd consecutive season in the top division of Israeli football.

== Squad ==
=== Squad information ===
| N | Pos. | Nat. | Name | Age | Since | App | Goals | Ends | Transfer fee | Notes |
|---|---|---|---|---|---|---|---|---|---|---|
| 3 | CB | (Israel) | Sean Goldberg | 30 | 2021/2022 | 153 | 4 | 2025/2026 | Free | Second nationality:Italy |
| 4 | DM | (Niger) | Ali Mohamed (vice captain) | 30 | 2021/2022 | 186 | 2 | 2026/2027 | 1,400,000€ | Second nationality:Israel |
| 7 | RW | (Curaçao) | Xander Severina | 24 | 2024/2025 | 26 | 6 | 2026/2027 | 1,300,000€ | Second nationality:Netherlands |
| 8 | LW | (Israel) | Dolev Haziza | 32 | 2019/2020 | 223 | 34 | 2026/2027 | 310,000€ | Second nationality:France |
| 9 | LW | (Spain) | Matías Nahuel | 29 | 2024/2025 | 14 | 1 | 2028/2029 | 2,500,000€ | Second nationality:Argentina |
| 10 | AM | (Israel) | Dia Saba | 33 | 2021/2022 | 72 | 31 | 2027/2028 | Free | |
| 11 | AM | (Israel) | Lior Refaelov (captain) | 39 | 2004/2005 | 343 | 67 | 2024/2025 | Free | Originally from youth system Second nationality:Belgium |
| 13 | GK | (Argentina) | Tomás Sultani | 27 | 2024/2025 | 3 | 0 | 2026/2027 | Free | Second nationality:Israel |
| 14 | LB | (Democratic Republic of the Congo) | Vital Nsimba | 32 | 2024/2025 | 16 | 0 | 2027/2028 | Free | Second nationality:Angola |
| 16 | LM | (United States) | Kenny Saief | 31 | 2023/2024 | 57 | 3 | 2023/2024 | Free | Second nationality:Israel |
| 18 | CF | (Israel) | Guy Melamed | 32 | 2024/2025 | 15 | 4 | 2026/2027 | 1,500,000€ | |
| 19 | CF | (Germany) | Erik Shuranov | 23 | 2023/2024 | 14 | 2 | 2025/2026 | 1,000,000€ | Second nationality:Ukraine |
| 21 | CF | (Israel) | Dean David | 29 | 2021/2022 | 193 | 83 | 2025/2026 | 1,100,000€ | |
| 23 | RB | (Israel) | Maor Kandil | 32 | 2023/2024 | 46 | 1 | 2025/2026 | Free | |
| 24 | DM | (Israel) | Ethan Azoulay | 23 | 2024/2025 | 34 | 2 | 2028/2029 | 1,500,000€ | |
| 26 | CM | (Israel) | Mahmoud Jaber | 26 | 2021/2022 | 130 | 4 | 2026/2027 | Youth system | |
| 28 | LW | (Israel) | Ilay Hagag | 24 | 2021/2022 | 42 | 3 | 2026/2027 | Youth system | |
| 29 | RB | (Israel) | Getachew Yabelo | 20 | 2021/2022 | 2 | 0 | 2026/2027 | Youth system | Second nationality:Ethiopia |
| 30 | CB | (Senegal) | Abdoulaye Seck | 33 | 2022/2023 | 118 | 11 | 2025/2026 | 400,000€ | |
| 31 | DM | (Israel) | Amit Arazi | 20 | 2024/2025 | 4 | 0 | 2026/2027 | Youth system | |
| 32 | DM | (Israel) | Itay Ehud | 19 | 2024/2025 | 2 | 0 | 2027/2028 | Youth system | |
| 33 | DM | (Israel) | Liam Hermesh | 21 | 2024/2025 | 13 | 0 | 2027/2028 | Youth system | |
| 34 | CB | (Ukraine) | Oleksandr Syrota | 25 | 2024/2025 | 28 | 2 | 2024/2025 | Free | |
| 35 | CB | (Israel) | Tomer Lannes Arbel | 19 | 2024/2025 | 2 | 0 | 2025/2026 | Youth system | |
| 36 | LW | (Israel) | Eyad Khlaily | 19 | 2024/2025 | 15 | 2 | 2027/2028 | Youth system | |
| 37 | CB | (Israel) | Elad Amir | 19 | 2024/2025 | 2 | 1 | 2026/2027 | Youth system | |
| 38 | CF | (Israel) | Omer Dahan | 20 | 2024/2025 | 8 | 3 | 2028/2029 | Youth system | |
| 39 | CB | (Israel) | Moran Adir Waheb | 19 | 2024/2025 | 1 | 0 | 2027/2028 | Youth system | |
| 40 | GK | (Israel) | Shareef Kayouf | 24 | 2021/2022 | 87 | 0 | 2028/2029 | Youth system | |
| 42 | RB | (Israel) | Roey Elimelech | 22 | 2023/2024 | 21 | 0 | 2027/2028 | Youth system | |
| 44 | CB | (Brazil) | Pedrão | 28 | 2024/2025 | 18 | 0 | 2027/2028 | 1,300,000€ | |
| 55 | CB | (Israel) | Rami Gershon | 37 | 2017/2018 | 136 | 2 | 2023/2024 | 400,000€ | |
| 77 | GK | (Israel) | Roee Fucs | 26 | 2020/2021 | 3 | 0 | 2023/2024 | Youth system | |
| 99 | CF | (Brazil) | Ricardinho | 24 | 2024/2025 | 10 | 1 | 2024/2025 | | |

- Last updated: 25 May 2025
- Source: mhaifafc.com
- Ordered by squad number.

=== Current coaching staff ===
| Position | Staff |
|---|---|
| Head Coach | (Israel) Barak Bakhar |
| Assistant Coach | (Israel) Amir Nussbaum |
| Assistant Coach | (Israel) Shahar Weisinger |
| Goalkeeping Coach | (Israel) Guy Weisinger |
| Goalkeeping Coach | (Israel) Eliad Graf |
| Physical trainer | (Israel) Dror Shimshon |
| Physical trainer | (Israel) Uri Harel |
| Physical trainer | (Israel) Gal Vaknin |
| Mental coach | (Israel) Danny Inbar |
| Analyst | (Israel) Eyal Gabay |
| Analyst | (Israel) Gal Avidan |
| Sport Director | (Israel) Gal Alberman |
| Club Administrator | (Israel) Gil Ofek |

Last updated: 11 June 2024
Source: F.C. Maccabi Haifa Official Website

=== Kits ===
- Supplier: Adidas
- Main Sponsor: Volvo
- Secondary Sponsor: Amram Avraham Group, Variety Israel

| Home | Away | Third |

== New contracts and transfers ==
=== New contracts ===
| Date | Pos. | Player | Age | Expires | Source |
|---|---|---|---|---|---|
| 17 June 2024 | CB | (Israel) Rami Gershon | 37 | June 2025 | |
| 22 July 2024 | LW | (Israel) Hamza Shibli | 21 | June 2027 | |
| 22 July 2024 | DM | (Israel) Liam Hermesh | 21 | June 2027 | |
| 4 September 2024 | RW | (Israel) Eyad Khlaily | 19 | June 2028 | |
| 11 November 2024 | RW | (Israel) Ilay Hagag | 24 | June 2027 | |
| 4 April 2025 | RB | (Israel) Roey Elimelech | 23 | June 2028 | |
| 16 April 2025 | LM | (Israel) Kenny Saief | 31 | June 2027 | |

=== Transfers in ===
| Date | Pos. | Player | Age | From | Fee | Source |
|---|---|---|---|---|---|---|
| 6 June 2024 | GK | (Argentina) Tomás Sultani | 27 | (Argentina) Arsenal | Free | |
| 14 July 2024 | DM | (Israel) Ethan Azoulay | 23 | (Israel) Maccabi Netanya | €1,500,000 | |
| 12 August 2024 | LB | (Democratic Republic of the Congo) Vital Nsimba | 32 | Free Agent | Free | |
| 29 August 2024 | CB | (Brazil) Pedrão | 28 | (Portugal) Portimonense | €1,300,000 | |
| 15 September 2024 | RW | (Curaçao) Xander Severina | 24 | (Serbia) Partizan | €1,300,000 | |
| 18 September 2024 | LW | (Spain) Matías Nahuel | 29 | (Poland) Śląsk Wrocław | €2,500,000 | |
| 23 January 2025 | CF | (Israel) Guy Melamed | 32 | (Israel) Hapoel Haifa | €1,500,000 | |

=== Transfers out ===
| Date | Pos. | Player | Age | Type | To | Fee | Source |
|---|---|---|---|---|---|---|---|
| 6 June 2024 | RW | (Israel) Anan Khalaily | 21 | Transfer | (Belgium) Saint-Gilloise | €7,500,000 | |
| 7 May 2024 | AM | (Suriname) Tjaronn Chery | 37 | Release | (Belgium) Antwerp | Free | |
| 9 May 2024 | LB | (Israel) Sun Menahem | 32 | Retired | | | |
| 24 May 2024 | GK | (Israel) Itamar Nitzan | 38 | Retired | | | |
| 17 June 2024 | CB | (Israel) Ori Dahan | 25 | Transfer | Beitar Jerusalem | Free | |
| 24 June 2024 | CF | (Israel) Tomer Hemed | 38 | Retired | | | |
| 30 June 2023 | CF | (Israel) Stav Nahmani | 23 | End of Contract | (Israel) F.C. Ashdod | €23,000 | |
| 30 June 2024 | LW | (Russia) Daniil Lesovoy | 27 | End of loan | (Russia) Dynamo Moscow | Free | |
| 12 July 2024 | CM | (Israel) Maor Levi | 25 | Part of Swap deal | (Israel) Maccabi Netanya | €500,000 | |
| 13 July 2024 | CM | (Israel) Yanai Distelfeld | 20 | Transfer | (Israel) Hapoel Jerusalem | €400,000 | |
| 17 July 2024 | CB | (Israel) Yonatan Laish | 21 | Transfer | (Israel) Hapoel Jerusalem | | |
| 22 August 2024 | LB | (France) Pierre Cornud | 28 | Transfer | (France) Saint-Étienne | €1,100,000 | |
| 25 August 2024 | RB | (Sweden) Daniel Sundgren | 35 | Release | (Greece) Volos | Free | |
| 10 September 2024 | CF | (Haiti) Frantzdy Pierrot | 30 | Transfer | (Greece) AEK Athens | €3,500,000 | |
| 29 January 2025 | RB | (Israel) Ilay Feingold | 21 | Transfer | (United States) New England Revolution | €2,400,000 | |

=== Loans in ===
| Date | Position | Player | Age | From | Fee | Source |
|---|---|---|---|---|---|---|
| 11 July 2024 | CB | (Ukraine) Oleksandr Syrota | 25 | (Ukraine) Dynamo Kyiv | Free | |
| 17 January 2025 | CF | (Brazil) Ricardinho | 24 | (Czech Republic) FC Viktoria Plzeň | Free | |

=== Loans return ===
| Date | Position | Player | Age | From | Fee | Source |
|---|---|---|---|---|---|---|
| 1 July 2024 | AM | (Israel) Dia Saba | 33 | (United Arab Emirates) Emirates Club | Free | |
| 1 July 2024 | LW | (Israel) Hamza Shibli | 21 | (Israel) Hapoel Petah Tikva | Free | |
| 1 July 2024 | RB | (Israel) Roey Elimelech | 22 | (Israel) Hapoel Petah Tikva | Free | |

=== Loans out ===
| Date | Pos. | Player | Age | To | Fee | Source |
|---|---|---|---|---|---|---|
| 21 June 2024 | CM | (Israel) Yarin Levi | 20 | (Israel) Beitar Jerusalem | Free | |
| 15 July 2024 | CB | (Israel) Tamir Arbel | 23 | (Israel) Hapoel Haifa | Free | |
| 22 July 2024 | DM | (Angola) Manuel Cafumana "Show" | 26 | (United States) FC Dallas | €750,000 | |
| 4 August 2024 | AM | (Israel) Ziv Ben Shimol | 21 | (Israel) Bnei Yehuda Tel Aviv | Free | |
| 5 August 2024 | GK | (Ukraine) Heorhiy Yermakov | 23 | (Ukraine) Oleksandriya | Free | |
| 20 August 2024 | AM | (Israel) Hamza Shibli | 21 | (Israel) Ironi Kiryat Shmona | Free | |
| 21 August 2024 | CB | (Israel) Lisav Naif Eissat | 20 | (Israel) Hapoel Hadera | Free | |
| 22 August 2024 | DM | (Israel) Goni Naor | 26 | (Israel) Hapoel Tel Aviv | Free | |
| 22 August 2024 | LW | (Israel) Suf Podgoreanu | 23 | (Netherlands) Heracles | Free | |
| 25 August 2024 | DM | (Israel) Lior Kasa | 20 | (Italy) Genoa | Free | |
| 30 August 2024 | CB | (Croatia) Lorenco Šimić | 29 | (Italy) Bari | Free | |

== Pre-season and friendlies ==
Win Draw Loss

| 28 June 2024 | Maccabi Haifa | 1–3 | Maccabi Petah Tikva | Kfar Galim |
| 10:00 | David 30' | Report | Lugasi 32'; Karatzo 73'; Dezent 76' | Stadium: Kfar Galim Training Ground |

| 1 July 2024 | Maccabi Haifa | 1–5 | Israel U-21 | Lod |
| 18:30 | Levi 95' | Report | 7', 16' Turgeman; 9' Davida; 38' Yona; 50' Yehoshua | Stadium: Lod Municipal Stadium; Attendance: 2,500; Referee: Snir Levi |

| 4 July 2024 | Maccabi Haifa (Israel) | 3–1 | (Andorra) Inter d'Escaldes | Girona, Spain |
| 19:30 (IDT) | David 45'; Pierrot 45+2' (pen.); Shuranov 73' (pen.) | Report | 53' (pen.) Gallego |

| 7 July 2024 | Maccabi Haifa (Israel) | 3–1 | (Andorra) Atlètic d'Escaldes | Girona, Spain |
| 19:30 (IDT) | Pierrot 13'; Pierre Cornud 18'; David 42' (pen.) | Report | 22' |

| 15 July 2024 | Maccabi Haifa | 2–1 | Israel U-21 | Yavne |
| 18:30 | David 9'; Pierrot 49' | Report | 6' Shahar | Stadium: Jackie Levy Stadium |

| 26 November 2024 | Maccabi Haifa | 6–0 | F.C. Dimona | Eilat |
| 15:00 | Kinda 9', 28', 50'; Refaelov 71', 84', 90' | Report | | Stadium: Eilat Kiryat Sports |

== Competitions ==
=== Overview ===
| Competition | First match | Last match | Starting round | Final position | Record | | | | | | | |
| Competition | First match | Last match | Starting round | Final position | Pld | W | D | L | GF | GA | GD | Win % |
|---|---|---|---|---|---|---|---|---|---|---|---|---|
| Ligat Ha'Al | 24 August 2024 | May 2025 | Matchday 1 | 3rd | 36 | 18 | 8 | 10 | 68 | 54 | +14 | 50.00 |
| State Cup | 30 December 2024 | 27 February 2025 | Round of 32 | Quarter-finals | 3 | 2 | 0 | 1 | 7 | 2 | +5 | 66.67 |
| Toto Cup | 20 July 2024 | 25 December 2024 | European qualification route | Runners-up | 3 | 2 | 0 | 1 | 6 | 4 | +2 | 66.67 |
| UEFA Europa Conference League | 25 July 2024 | 1 August 2024 | Second qualifying round | Second qualifying round | 2 | 1 | 0 | 1 | 6 | 6 | +0 | 50.00 |
| Total | | | | | 44 | 23 | 8 | 13 | 87 | 66 | +21 | 52.27 |

Last updated: 25 May 2025
Source: Competitions

== Ligat Ha'Al ==
=== Regular season ===
==== Regular season table ====
| Pos | Team | Pld | W | D | L | GF | GA | GD | Pts | Qualification |
|---|---|---|---|---|---|---|---|---|---|---|
| 1 | Hapoel Be'er Sheva | 26 | 18 | 6 | 2 | 52 | 18 | +34 | 58 (Note: Hapoel Be'er Sheva had 2 points deducted following riot in Bnei Sakhnin match.) | Qualification for the Championship round |
| 2 | Maccabi Tel Aviv | 26 | 17 | 6 | 3 | 56 | 27 | +29 | 57 | Qualification for the Championship round |
| 3 | Maccabi Haifa | 26 | 14 | 6 | 6 | 54 | 32 | +22 | 47 (Note: Maccabi Haifa had 1 point deducted following riot in Maccabi Tel Aviv match.) | Qualification for the Championship round |
| 4 | Beitar Jerusalem | 26 | 13 | 7 | 6 | 48 | 34 | +14 | 46 | Qualification for the Championship round |
| 5 | Hapoel Haifa | 26 | 12 | 5 | 9 | 39 | 31 | +8 | 41 | Qualification for the Championship round |

Source: Soccerway, One
Rules for classification: 1) Points; 2) Goal difference; 3) Matches won; 4) Goals scored; 5) Head-to-head points; 6) Head-to-head goal difference; 7) Head-to-head goals scored; 8) Play-off.

==== Regular season matches ====
Win Draw Loss

| 24 August 2024 1 | Maccabi Haifa | 4–0 | Ironi Tiberias | Haifa |
| 20:00 | Saief (yellow card) 36'; David 45+3', 60', 69'; Saba 80'; Syrota (yellow card) 90+1' | Report | (yellow card) 38' Abu Akel | Stadium: Sammy Ofer Stadium; Attendance: 26,432; Referee: David Foxman |

| 31 August 2024 2 | Maccabi Netanya | 0–2 | Maccabi Haifa | Netanya |
| 20:30 | | Report | Azoulay (yellow card) 15'; Pierrot 33'; 76' Saba; (yellow card) 85' Syrota | Stadium: Netanya Stadium; Attendance: 11,194; Referee: Gal Leibovich |

| 14 September 2024 3 | Maccabi Bnei Reineh | 2–2 | Maccabi Haifa | Nof HaGalil |
| 20:00 | Ghanayem (yellow card) 35'; Henty (yellow card) 43'; Ghanem (yellow card) 60'; Hadida 61', 90+14' (pen.) | Report | 17' Saba; (yellow card) 19' Pedrão; (yellow card) 90' Feingold; 90+2' Syrota | Stadium: Green Stadium; Attendance: 4,287; Referee: Idan Leiba |

| 28 September 2024 5 | Ironi Kiryat Shmona | 0–4 | Maccabi Haifa | Netanya |
| 19:15 | Wodaje (yellow card) 45+1'; Bangoura (yellow card) 47'; Habshi (yellow card) 74'; Ben David (yellow card) 85' | Report | (yellow card) 8' Haziza; 16' (o.g.) Cohen; (yellow card) 48' Pedrão; (yellow card) 49' Saba; 66', 75' David; 72' Syrota | Stadium: Netanya Stadium; Attendance: 0 (Note: Played Behind closed doors due to the September 2024 Israeli attacks against Lebanon); Referee: Aviad Shiloach |
Note: originally scheduled for 30 September due to the September 2024 Israeli attacks against Lebanon .

| 5 October 2024 6 | Maccabi Haifa | 3–0 | Bnei Sakhnin | Haifa |
| 19:30 | Nsimba (yellow card) 8'; Abu Nil 25' (o.g.); Feingold (yellow card) 54'; David 62'; Saba 90+3' | Report | (yellow card) 69' Elmkies; (yellow card) 86' Soteriou | Stadium: Sammy Ofer Stadium; Attendance: 0 Referee: Ygal Frid |

| 19 October 2024 7 | Maccabi Tel Aviv | 2–0 | Maccabi Haifa | Jerusalem (Note: due to the September 2024 Israeli attacks against Lebanon the Home Front Command and the Israel Football Association was limited the number of attendance) |
| 20:00 | Madmon (yellow card) 5', (goal) 23'; Kanichowsky 18'; Asante (yellow card) 44'; Davida (penalty missed) 60; Shlomo (yellow card) 82' | Report | (yellow card) 87' Jaber | Stadium: Teddy Stadium; Attendance: 19,980; Referee: Orel Grinfeld |
Note: due to the September 2024 Israeli attacks against Lebanon the Home Front Command and the Israel Football Association was limited the number of attendance in Tel Aviv, Played in Jerusalem

| 22 October 2024 4 | Beitar Jerusalem | 3–2 | Maccabi Haifa | Jerusalem (Note: Order of legs reversed due to the September 2024 Israeli attacks against Lebanon originally scheduled play in Sammy Ofer Stadium, Haifa) |
| 19:30 | Muzie (yellow card) 19', (goal) 76'; Soro (yellow card) 22'; Twumasi 34'; Shua (yellow card) 44'; Dahan (yellow card) 61'; Jeno 71' | Report | 21', 50', (yellow card) 61' David; (yellow card) 40' Jaber; (yellow card) 52' Nsimba | Stadium: Teddy Stadium; Attendance: 22,000; Referee: Gal Leibovich |
Note: originally scheduled for 23 September due to the September 2024 Israeli attacks against Lebanon and October 2024 Iranian strikes against Israel suspanded .

| 28 October 2024 8 | Maccabi Haifa | 4–2 | Hapoel Hadera | Be'er Sheva |
| 20:00 | David 16'; Refaelov 41', 90+2'; Severina 79' | Report | (yellow card) 8', (goal) 45+1' (pen.) Einbinder; 52' Shoolmayster; (yellow card) 67' Cissé; (yellow card) 75' Lababidi; (yellow card) 84' (yellow-red card) 86' Mbodj | Stadium: Turner Stadium; Attendance: 9,234; Referee: Sapir Berman |
Note: originally scheduled for 26 October 2024 .

| 4 November 2024 9 | Hapoel Haifa | 1–4 | Maccabi Haifa | Jerusalem |
| 20:30 | Salou (yellow card) 51'; Melamed 52' (pen.); Dgani (yellow card) 82' | Report | (yellow card) 38' David; 41', 84' (pen.) Saba; (yellow card) 53' Goldberg; (yellow card) 62' Hagag; 72' (pen.), (yellow card) 85' Refaelov; (yellow card) 80' Seck; 90+3' Severina | Stadium: Teddy Stadium; Attendance: 5,770; Referee: Ygal Frid |

| 8 November 2024 10 | Hapoel Jerusalem | 0–0 | Maccabi Haifa | Jerusalem |
| 15:00 | Piven (yellow card) 41'; Zamir (yellow card) 79'; Hozez (yellow card) 80'; Dahan (yellow card) 90+5' | Report | (yellow card) 90+4' Azoulay | Stadium: Teddy Stadium; Attendance: 13,000; Referee: Ohad Asulin |
Note: originally scheduled for 9 November 2024 .

| 30 November 2024 11 | Maccabi Petah Tikva | 1–2 | Maccabi Haifa | Petah Tikva |
| 15:00 | Galabov (yellow card) 21'; Štor 59'; Glazer (yellow card) 74'; Gojković (yellow card) 78'; Karo (yellow card) 90+3' | Report | (yellow card) 23' Severina; (yellow card) 62' Haziza; 73', 85' Refaelov | Stadium: HaMoshava Stadium; Attendance: 9,460; Referee: Snir Levi |

| 4 December 2024 12 | Maccabi Haifa | 0–2 | Hapoel Be'er Sheva | Haifa |
| 20:30 | David (yellow card) 25'; Seck (yellow card) 82' | Report | (yellow card) 38' Garita; 67', (yellow card) 68' Kangwa; 88' Peretz | Stadium: Sammy Ofer Stadium; Attendance: 28,650; Referee: Ygal Frid |

| 7 December 2024 13 | F.C. Ashdod | 1–3 | Maccabi Haifa | Ashdod |
| 19:30 | Muche 68' | Report | 8' David; (yellow card) 39', (goal) 41' Saba; (yellow card) 48' Seck; 53' Khlaily | Stadium: Yud-Alef Stadium; Attendance: 6,133; Referee: Nael Odeh |

| 15 December 2024 14 | Ironi Tiberias | 0–0 | Maccabi Haifa | Nof HaGalil |
| 20:15 | Zarora (yellow card) 9' | Report | (penalty missed) 19 David; (yellow card) 78' Elimelech; (yellow card) 82' Saba; (yellow card) 90+4' Haziza | Stadium: Green Stadium; Attendance: 4,800; Referee: Gal Levi |

| 21 December 2024 15 | Maccabi Haifa | 2–1 | Maccabi Netanya | Haifa |
| 20:00 | David 9'; Saba 50'; Seck (yellow card) 74'; Ilay Hagag (yellow card) 90+5' | Report | (yellow card) 37' Levi; (yellow card) 40' Keller; 72' (pen.) Zlatanović | Stadium: Sammy Ofer Stadium; Attendance: 26,126; Referee: Orel Grinfeld |

| 2 January 2025 16 | Maccabi Haifa | 2–0 | Maccabi Bnei Reineh | Haifa |
| 20:00 | Refaelov (yellow card) 5'; David 34'; Saba 76' | Report | (yellow card) 5' Ljubisavljević | Stadium: Sammy Ofer Stadium; Attendance: 23,432; Referee: Sapir Berman |

| 6 January 2025 17 | Maccabi Haifa | 1–3 | Beitar Jerusalem | Haifa |
| 20:30 | Haziza (yellow card) 45'; Mohamed (yellow card) 45+9' (yellow-red card); Feingold (yellow card) 45+11'; Saief 67'; Saba (yellow card) 75' | Report | (penalty missed) 45+2, 45+2' Shua; (yellow card) 58' Soro; (red card) 60' Silva; (yellow card) 72' Zasno; 82' Kangani; 88' Twumasi | Stadium: Sammy Ofer Stadium; Attendance: 26,306; Referee: Orel Grinfeld |
Note: originally scheduled play in Teedy Stadium, Jerusalem due September 2024 Israeli attacks against Lebanon Order of legs reversed after original draw

| 11 January 2025 18 | Maccabi Haifa | 4–1 | Ironi Kiryat Shmona | Haifa |
| 15:00 | Saba (penalty missed) 18, 38', 41'; Seck (yellow card) 27'; Feingold (yellow card) 33'; Haziza 36' (pen.); Refaelov 85' | Report | (yellow card) 14' Shahin; (yellow card) 17' Habshi; 64' Jardel | Stadium: Sammy Ofer Stadium; Attendance: 28,034; Referee: Nael Odeh |

| 18 January 2025 19 | Bnei Sakhnin | 0–3 w/o | Maccabi Haifa | Acre |
| 17:30 | | Report | | Stadium: Acre Municipal Stadium; Attendance: 4,500; Referee: Ohad Asulin |
Note: Maccabi Haifa won 3–0 by w/o due Bnei Sakhnin fielding suspended player

| 27 January 2025 20 | Maccabi Haifa | 0–3 w/o | Maccabi Tel Aviv | Haifa |
| 20:30 | | | | Stadium: Sammy Ofer Stadium; Referee: Ygal Frid |
Note: Maccabi Haifa lose 3–0 by w/o due attendance riot

| 1 February 2025 21 | Hapoel Hadera | 1–3 | Maccabi Haifa | Netanya |
| 19:30 | Zalka 32', (yellow card) 74'; Mamadou Mbodj (yellow card) 37'; Lababidi (yellow card) 77'; Bardea (yellow card) 78' | Report | (yellow card) 30' Azoulay; 50', (yellow card) 89' Saba; (yellow card) 78', (goal) 85' Seck; (yellow card) 81' Kandil; 90+7' David | Stadium: Netanya Stadium; Attendance: 6,265; Referee: David Foxman |

| 10 February 2025 22 | Maccabi Haifa | 1–1 | Hapoel Haifa | Haifa |
| 20:30 | Elimelech (yellow card) 9'; Seck (yellow card) 45+2'; Kinda (yellow card) 74'; Hagag (yellow card) 74'; Haziza (yellow card) 86'; Refaelov 90+8' | Report | (yellow card) 35' Doumbia; 55' (o.g.) Goldberg; (yellow card) 74' Malul; (yellow card) 90+1' Gerafi | Stadium: Sammy Ofer Stadium; Attendance: 27,656; Referee: Snir Levi |

| 17 February 2025 23 | Maccabi Haifa | 3–3 | Hapoel Jerusalem | Haifa |
| 20:30 | David (yellow card) 27'; Saba 47', (yellow card) 58'; Refaelov 63', 89'; Haziza (yellow card) 77' | Report | 9', 33' Almog; (yellow card) 14' Badash; (yellow card) 49' Madmon; (yellow card) 67' Almagor; 82' Ransom | Stadium: Sammy Ofer Stadium; Attendance: 20,140; Referee: Nael Odeh |

| 22 February 2025 24 | Maccabi Haifa | 1–0 | Maccabi Petah Tikva | Haifa |
| 15:00 | Melamed (yellow card) 37'; Refaelov (yellow card) 56'; Saba 71' | Report | (yellow card) 6' Salem; (yellow card) 56' Harris; (yellow card) 62' De Reuck; (yellow card) 78' Altoury | Stadium: Sammy Ofer Stadium; Attendance: 18,732; Referee: Gal Levy |

| 3 March 2025 25 | Hapoel Be'er Sheva | 3–3 | Maccabi Haifa | Be'er Sheva |
| 20:30 | Turgeman 66'; Ponck (yellow card) 67'; Lopes 69', 87'; Kangwa (yellow card) 90+2' | Report | (yellow card) 3' Syrota; 36' Saief; 45+2', (yellow card) 45+3' Saba; (yellow card) 45+5' David; (yellow card) 47' Azoulay; (yellow card) 48' Haziza; 64' Ricardinho; (yellow card) 90+1' Hermesh | Stadium: Turner Stadium; Attendance: 15,678; Referee: Sapir Berman |

| 9 March 2025 26 | Maccabi Haifa | 1–2 | F.C. Ashdod | Haifa |
| 20:15 | Melamed 67'; Mahmoud Jaber (yellow card) 90+4' | Report | 45+1' Muche; 89' Azulay | Stadium: Sammy Ofer Stadium; Attendance: 16,124; Referee: Yoav Mizrahi |

=== Championship round ===
==== Championship round table ====
| Pos | Team | Pld | W | D | L | GF | GA | GD | Pts | Qualification | MTA | HBS | MHA | BEI | HHA | MNE |
|---|---|---|---|---|---|---|---|---|---|---|---|---|---|---|---|---|
| 1 | Maccabi Tel Aviv (C) | 36 | 24 | 8 | 4 | 86 | 36 | +50 | 80 | Qualification for the Champions League second qualifying round | — | 1–1 | 1–1 | 5–0 | 3–0 | 4–1 |
| 2 | Hapoel Be'er Sheva | 36 | 24 | 8 | 4 | 75 | 28 | +47 | 78 (Note: Hapoel Be'er Sheva had 2 points deducted following riot in Bnei Sakhnin match.) | Qualification for the Europa League first qualifying round (Note: Hapoel Be'er Sheva qualified for the Europa League first qualifying round as the 2024–25 Israel State Cup winners; the second Conference League spot was passed to the fourth-placed team.) | 1–3 | — | 4–1 | 3–1 | 5–0 | 2–0 |
| 3 | Maccabi Haifa | 36 | 18 | 8 | 10 | 68 | 54 | +14 | 61 (Note: Maccabi Haifa had 1 point deducted following riot in Maccabi Tel Aviv match.) | Qualification for the Conference League second qualifying round | 0–3 | 0–3 | — | 3–3 | 1–5 | 1–0 |
| 4 | Beitar Jerusalem | 36 | 15 | 9 | 12 | 58 | 54 | +4 | 53 (Note: Beitar Jerusalem had 1 point deducted following riot in Maccabi Haifa match.) | Qualification for the Conference League second qualifying round | 3–1 | 1–1 | 1–2 | — | 0–1 | 0–3 |
| 5 | Hapoel Haifa | 36 | 15 | 7 | 14 | 51 | 50 | +1 | 52 | | 1–3 | 1–2 | 0–2 | 1–0 | — | 1–1 |
| 6 | Maccabi Netanya | 36 | 13 | 6 | 17 | 51 | 58 | −7 | 45 | | 1–6 | 2–1 | 2–3 | 0–1 | 2–2 | — |

Source: Soccerway
Rules for classification: 1) Points; 2) Goal difference; 3) Matches won; 4) Goals scored; 5) Head-to-head points; 6) Head-to-head goal difference; 7) Head-to-head goals scored; 8) Play-off.
(C) Champions

==== Championship round matches ====
| 16 March 2025 27 | Maccabi Haifa | 3–3 | Beitar Jerusalem | Haifa |
| 20:30 | Saba 10', (yellow card) 11'; Goldberg (yellow card) 16'; Seck (yellow card) 36'; Haziza (yellow card) 45+1'; Refaelov 45+7' (pen.); Severina 80' | Report | (yellow card) 37' Zasno; 39' Jeno; 45+4' (pen.) Atzili; (yellow card) 64' Morozov; 90+3' Mizrahi | Stadium: Sammy Ofer Stadium; Attendance: 28,103; Referee: Ygal Frid |

| 29 March 2025 28 | Hapoel Haifa | 0–2 | Maccabi Haifa | Haifa |
| 20:30 | Dgani (yellow card) 39'; Mayembo (yellow card) 41'; Ben Harush (yellow card) 56' | Report | 38', (yellow card) 90+4' Saief; (yellow card) 45+1' Refaelov; (yellow card) 51' Severina; (yellow card) 56' Saba; 75' Melamed; (yellow card) 86' Ricardinho | Stadium: Sammy Ofer Stadium; Attendance: 13,100; Referee: Gal Levi |

| 7 April 2025 29 | Maccabi Haifa | 0–3 | Hapoel Be'er Sheva | Haifa |
| 20:30 | Mohamed (yellow card) 79'; Keouf (yellow card) 81' | Report | (yellow card) 26' Stoyanov; (yellow card) 43' Blorian; 53' Turgeman; 86' (pen.) Biton; (yellow card) 88' Elias; 90+6' Baltaxa | Stadium: Sammy Ofer Stadium; Attendance: David Foxman; Referee: 27,341 |

| 14 April 2025 30 | Maccabi Tel Aviv | 1–1 | Maccabi Haifa | Tel Aviv |
| 20:30 | Zahavi 51', (yellow card) 52' | Report | 59', (yellow card) 63' Severina; (yellow card) 77' Mohamed; (yellow card) 88' Saief | Stadium: Bloomfield Stadium; Attendance: 28,429; Referee: Gal Leibovich |

| 20 April 2025 31 | Maccabi Haifa | 1–0 | Maccabi Netanya | Haifa |
| 20:15 | Djetei 8' (o.g.); Saief (yellow card) 14'; Saba (yellow card) 32'; Pedrão (yellow card) 36'; Mohamed (yellow card) 64' | Report | (yellow card) 45+2' Sadeh | Stadium: Sammy Ofer Stadium; Attendance: 17,120; Referee: Ohad Asulin |

| 28 April 2025 32 | Beitar Jerusalem | 1–2 | Maccabi Haifa | Jerusalem |
| 20:30 | Shua 60' (pen.); Morozov (yellow card) 63'; Levi (yellow card) 90+7' | Report | 31', (yellow card) 75' Severina; 42' David; (yellow card) 59' Keouf; (yellow card) 68' Jaber; (yellow card) 70' Mohamed | Stadium: Teddy Stadium; Attendance: 26,300; Referee: Snir Levi |

| 3 May 2025 33 | Maccabi Haifa | 1–5 | Hapoel Haifa | Haifa |
| 20:30 | Nsimba (yellow card) 28'; Elimelecha (yellow card) 35'; Jaber (yellow card) 49'; Mohamed (yellow card) 78'; Melamed 79'; Haziza (yellow card) 87' | Report | 12', 29', 54', (yellow card) 30' East; (yellow card) 25' Ben Harush; (yellow card) 36' Dgani; 41', 50' Diarra | Stadium: Sammy Ofer Stadium; Attendance: 24,130; Referee: Yoav Mizrahi |

| 12 May 2025 34 | Hapoel Be'er Sheva | 4–1 | Maccabi Haifa | Be'er Sheva |
| 20:30 | Ahmed (yellow card) 13'; Biton 45'; Kangwa 45+2'; Turgeman 75'; Gordana (yellow card) 86'; Ganah 90+3' | Report | 47' Haziza; (yellow card) 81' Elimelech; (yellow card) 86' Seck; (penalty missed) 90+7 Saba | Stadium: Turner Stadium; Attendance: 15,642; Referee: David Foxman |

| 19 May 2025 35 | Maccabi Haifa | 0–3 | Maccabi Tel Aviv | Haifa |
| 20:30 | Elimelech (yellow card) 31'; Seck (red card) 82'; Azoulay (yellow card) 85'; Mohamed (yellow card) 90+1' | Report | 23' Patati; (yellow card) 45' Zahavi; 52' Davida; (yellow card) 70' Sissokho; 87' Ido Shahar | Stadium: Sammy Ofer Stadium; Attendance: 27,843; Referee: Orel Grinfeld |

| 24 May 2025 36 | Maccabi Netanya | 2–3 | Maccabi Haifa | Netanya |
| 20:30 | Freddy Vargas (Venezuelan footballer) 8'; Cohen 25' | Report | 1' Severina; (yellow card) 43' Azoulay; (yellow card) 49' Syrota; 60' Amir; 65' Melamed | Stadium: Netanya Stadium; Referee: Refael Geva |

=== Overall ===
==== Results overview ====
Win Draw Loss

| Opposition | Regular season | | Championship round | |
| Opposition | Home score | Away score | Home score | Away score |
|---|---|---|---|---|
| Beitar Jerusalem | 1–3 | 2–3 | 3–3 | 2–1 |
| Bnei Sakhnin | 3–0 | 3–0 | — | |
| F.C. Ashdod | 1–2 | 3–1 | — | |
| Hapoel Be'er Sheva | 0–2 | 3–3 | 0–3 | 1–4 |
| Hapoel Hadera | 4–2 | 3–1 | — | |
| Hapoel Haifa | 1–1 | 4–1 | 1–5 | 2–0 |
| Hapoel Jerusalem | 3–3 | 0–0 | — | |
| Ironi Kiryat Shmona | 4–1 | 4–0 | — | |
| Ironi Tiberias | 4–0 | 0–0 | — | |
| Maccabi Bnei Reineh | 2–0 | 2–2 | — | |
| Maccabi Netanya | 2–1 | 2–0 | 1–0 | 3–2 |
| Maccabi Petah Tikva | 1–0 | 2–1 | — | |
| Maccabi Tel Aviv | 0–3 | 0–2 | 0–3 | 1–1 |

==== Results summary ====
| Overall | | | | | | | | Home | | | | | | Away | | | | | |
| Pld | W | D | L | GF | GA | GD | Pts | W | D | L | GF | GA | GD | W | D | L | GF | GA | GD |
|---|---|---|---|---|---|---|---|---|---|---|---|---|---|---|---|---|---|---|---|
| 35 | 17 | 8 | 10 | 65 | 52 | +13 | 59 | 8 | 3 | 7 | 31 | 32 | −1 | 9 | 5 | 3 | 34 | 20 | +14 |

Last updated: 20 May 2025.
Source: Competitive matches

- Maccabi Haifa had one point deducted following riot in Maccabi Tel Aviv match

==== Results by round ====
| Round | 1 | 2 | 3 | 4 | 5 | 6 | 7 | 8 | 9 | 10 | 11 | 12 | 13 | 14 | 15 | 16 | 17 | 18 | 19 | 20 | 21 | 22 | 23 | 24 | 25 | 26 | 27 | 28 | 29 | 30 | 31 | 32 | 33 | 34 | 35 | 36 |
|---|---|---|---|---|---|---|---|---|---|---|---|---|---|---|---|---|---|---|---|---|---|---|---|---|---|---|---|---|---|---|---|---|---|---|---|---|
| Ground | H | A | A | A | A | H | A | H | A | A | A | H | A | A | H | H | H | H | A | H | A | H | H | H | A | H | H | A | H | A | H | A | H | A | H | A |
| Result | W | W | D | L | W | W | L | W | W | D | W | L | W | D | W | W | L | W | W | L | W | D | D | W | D | L | D | W | L | D | W | W | L | L | L | W |
| Position | 1 | 1 | 2 | — | 2 | 2 | 3 | 2 | 1 | 4 | 3 | 4 | 3 | 4 | 3 | 3 | 3 | 3 | 3 | 3 | 3 | 3 | 3 | 3 | 3 | 3 | 3 | 3 | 3 | 3 | 3 | 3 | 3 | 3 | 3 | 3 |

Source: Competitive Matches
A = Away; H = Home; W = Win; D = Draw; L = Loss

== State Cup ==
=== Round of 32 ===
| 30 December 2024 Round of 32 | Maccabi Haifa | 6–0 | Ironi Ashkelon | Haifa |
| 19:30 | Nahuel 15'; Azoulay 23'; Kinda 42'; Dahan 48', 76'; Khlaily 52' | Report | | Stadium: Sammy Ofer Stadium; Attendance: 10,177; Referee: Gal Levi |

=== Round of 16 ===
| 14 January 2025 Round of 16 | Maccabi Haifa | 1–0 | Maccabi Netanya | Haifa |
| 20:15 | Kinda (yellow card) 12'; Azoulay (yellow card) 57', (goal) 62'; Haziza (yellow card) 58' | Report | (yellow card) 4' Sadeh; (yellow card) 25' Levi | Stadium: Sammy Ofer Stadium; Attendance: 17,010; Referee: Gal Leibovich |

=== Quarter-finals ===
| 27 February 2025 Quarter-finals | Hapoel Be'er Sheva | 2–0 | Maccabi Haifa | Be'er Sheva |
| 20:30 | Biton 35' (pen.), 84'; Lopes (yellow card) 80' | Report | (yellow card) 34' Keouf | Stadium: Turner Stadium; Attendance: 15,608; Referee: Orel Grinfeld |

== Toto Cup ==
| 20 July 2024 European Route | Maccabi Haifa | 3–0 | Hapoel Be'er Sheva | Haifa |
| 20:30 | David 35'; Kinda 61'; Saba 70'; Šimić (yellow card) 89' | Report | (yellow card) 17' Gordana; (yellow card) 24' Mizrahi; (yellow card) 37' Elias; (yellow card) 40' Hatuel | Stadium: Sammy Ofer; Attendance: 12,193; Referee: David Foxman |

| 17 August 2024 Semi-Finals | Maccabi Haifa | 2–1 | Maccabi Netanya | Haifa |
| 20:30 | Saba 27', 86'; Seck (yellow card) 90+5' | Report | 3' Levi; (yellow card) 32' Zlatanović; (yellow card) 72' Plakuschenko | Stadium: Sammy Ofer; Attendance: 17,153; Referee: Snir Levi |

| 25 December 2024 Final | Maccabi Tel Aviv | 3–1 | Maccabi Haifa | Netanya |
| 20:00 | Turgeman (yellow card) 22'; Stojić (yellow card) 35'; Peretz (yellow card) 40', (goal) 67', 77'; Patati (yellow card) 52', (goal) 62' | Report | 29', (yellow card) 35' David; (yellow card) 42' Jaber; (penalty missed) 53 Saba; (yellow card) 68' Mohamed; (yellow card) 80' Azoulay | Stadium: Netanya Stadium; Attendance: 13,016; Referee: Snir Levi |

== UEFA Europa Conference League ==
=== Second qualifying round ===
| 25 July 2024 Second qualifying round – 1st leg | Maccabi Haifa (Israel) | 0–3 | (Azerbaijan) Sabah | Kisvárda, Hungary |
| 19:15 (20:15 IDT) | Cornud (yellow card) 7'; Mohamed (yellow card) 36'; Sundgren (yellow card) 60'; Pierrot (yellow card) 88' | Report | 61' Šafranko; 78', (yellow card) 52' Sekidika; 88' Aliyev | Stadium: Várkerti Stadion; Attendance: 270; Referee: Nathan Verboomen (Belgium) |

| 1 August 2024 Second qualifying round – 2nd leg | Sabah (Azerbaijan) | 3–6 (a.e.t.) (3–2 p) | (Israel) Maccabi Haifa | Masazır |
| 20:00 (19:00 IDT) | Šafranko 47'; Kaheem Parris 72'; Mickels 103' | Report | 16' Haziza; 67', 90' Pierrot; 71' Šimić; 73' Refaelov; 112' David | Stadium: Bank Respublika Arena; Attendance: 8,000; Referee: Peter Kralović (Slovakia) |
| | Penalties |
| | Chakla (penalty scored); Joy-Lance Mickels (penalty missed); Aliyev (penalty scored); Lepinjica (penalty scored) | | (penalty scored) Refaelov; (penalty scored) David; (penalty missed) Saief; (penalty missed) Saba; (penalty missed) Pierrot |

== Statistics ==
=== Squad statistics ===
| | | | | Ligat HaAl | | State Cup | | Toto Cup | | UCEL | | Total | |
| Nation | No. | Pos. | Name | App. | Goals. | App. | Goals. | App. | Goals. | App. | Goals. | App. | Goals. |
|---|---|---|---|---|---|---|---|---|---|---|---|---|---|
| (Israel) | 3 | CB | Sean Goldberg | 20 | 0 | 3 | 0 | 1 | 0 | 0 | 0 | 24 | 0 |
| (Niger) | 4 | DM | Ali Mohamed | 27 | 0 | 2 | 0 | 1 | 0 | 2 | 0 | 32 | 0 |
| (Israel) | 6 | AM | Gadi Kinda | 25 | 0 | 3 | 1 | 3 | 1 | 2 | 0 | 33 | 2 |
| (Curaçao) | 7 | RW | Xander Severina | 23 | 6 | 2 | 0 | 1 | 0 | 0 | 0 | 26 | 6 |
| (Israel) | 8 | LW | Dolev Haziza | 31 | 2 | 3 | 0 | 3 | 0 | 2 | 1 | 39 | 3 |
| (Spain) | 9 | LW | Matías Nahuel | 12 | 0 | 1 | 1 | 1 | 0 | 0 | 0 | 14 | 1 |
| (Israel) | 10 | AM | Dia Saba | 34 | 16 | 2 | 0 | 3 | 3 | 2 | 0 | 40 | 19 |
| (Israel) | 11 | AM | Lior Refaelov | 32 | 10 | 2 | 0 | 2 | 0 | 2 | 1 | 38 | 11 |
| (Argentina) | 13 | GK | Tomás Sultani | 1 | 0 | 1 | 0 | 1 | 0 | 0 | 0 | 3 | 0 |
| (Democratic Republic of the Congo) | 14 | LB | Vital Nsimba | 16 | 0 | 0 | 0 | 0 | 0 | 0 | 0 | 16 | 0 |
| (United States) | 16 | LM | Kenny Saief | 26 | 3 | 2 | 0 | 2 | 0 | 1 | 0 | 31 | 3 |
| (Israel) | 18 | CF | Guy Melamed | 14 | 4 | 1 | 0 | 0 | 0 | 0 | 0 | 15 | 4 |
| (Germany) | 19 | CF | Erik Shuranov | 3 | 0 | 0 | 0 | 0 | 0 | 0 | 0 | 3 | 0 |
| (Israel) | 21 | CF | Dean David | 30 | 14 | 1 | 0 | 3 | 2 | 2 | 1 | 36 | 17 |
| (Israel) | 23 | RB | Maor Kandil | 8 | 0 | 1 | 0 | 1 | 0 | 0 | 0 | 10 | 0 |
| (Israel) | 24 | DM | Ethan Azoulay | 30 | 0 | 2 | 2 | 2 | 0 | 0 | 0 | 34 | 2 |
| (Israel) | 26 | CM | Mahmoud Jaber | 31 | 0 | 2 | 0 | 2 | 0 | 2 | 0 | 37 | 0 |
| (Israel) | 28 | LW | Ilay Hagag | 13 | 0 | 2 | 0 | 3 | 0 | 2 | 0 | 20 | 0 |
| (Israel) | 32 | RB | Getachew Yabelo | 2 | 0 | 0 | 0 | 0 | 0 | 0 | 0 | 2 | 0 |
| (Senegal) | 30 | CB | Abdoulaye Seck | 31 | 1 | 1 | 0 | 2 | 0 | 1 | 0 | 35 | 1 |
| (Israel) | 31 | DM | Amit Arazi | 4 | 0 | 0 | 0 | 0 | 0 | 0 | 0 | 4 | 0 |
| (Israel) | 32 | DM | Itay Ehud | 2 | 0 | 0 | 0 | 0 | 0 | 0 | 0 | 2 | 0 |
| (Israel) | 33 | DM | Liam Hermesh | 10 | 0 | 2 | 0 | 1 | 0 | 0 | 0 | 13 | 0 |
| (Ukraine) | 34 | CB | Oleksandr Syrota | 22 | 2 | 2 | 0 | 2 | 0 | 2 | 0 | 28 | 2 |
| (Israel) | 35 | CB | Tomer Lannes Arbel | 2 | 0 | 0 | 0 | 0 | 0 | 0 | 0 | 2 | 0 |
| (Israel) | 36 | LW | Eyad Khlaily | 13 | 1 | 1 | 1 | 1 | 0 | 0 | 0 | 15 | 2 |
| (Israel) | 37 | CB | Elad Amir | 2 | 0 | 0 | 0 | 0 | 0 | 0 | 0 | 2 | 0 |
| (Israel) | 38 | CF | Omer Dahan | 6 | 0 | 2 | 2 | 0 | 0 | 0 | 0 | 8 | 2 |
| (Israel) | 39 | CB | Moran Adir Waheb | 1 | 0 | 0 | 0 | 0 | 0 | 0 | 0 | 1 | 0 |
| (Israel) | 40 | GK | Shareef Kayouf | 35 | 0 | 2 | 0 | 2 | 0 | 2 | 0 | 41 | 0 |
| (Israel) | 42 | RB | Roey Elimelech | 14 | 0 | 2 | 0 | 2 | 0 | 2 | 0 | 20 | 0 |
| (Brazil) | 44 | CB | Pedrão | 16 | 0 | 1 | 0 | 1 | 0 | 0 | 0 | 18 | 0 |
| (Israel) | 55 | CB | Rami Gershon | 1 | 0 | 2 | 0 | 0 | 0 | 0 | 0 | 3 | 0 |
| (Israel) | 77 | GK | Roee Fucs | 0 | 0 | 0 | 0 | 0 | 0 | 0 | 0 | 0 | 0 |
| (Brazil) | 99 | CF | Ricardinho | 10 | 1 | 0 | 0 | 1 | 0 | 0 | 0 | 11 | 1 |
Players who have made an appearance this season but have left the club
| (Sweden) | 2 | RB | Daniel Sundgren | 0 | 0 | 0 | 0 | 2 | 0 | 2 | 0 | 4 | 0 |
| (Haiti) | 9 | CF | Frantzdy Pierrot | 2 | 1 | 0 | 0 | 2 | 0 | 2 | 2 | 6 | 3 |
| (Israel) | 17 | LW | Suf Podgoreanu | 0 | 0 | 0 | 0 | 0 | 0 | 1 | 0 | 1 | 0 |
| (Israel) | 18 | DM | Goni Naor | 0 | 0 | 0 | 0 | 1 | 0 | 0 | 0 | 1 | 0 |
| (Israel) | 22 | RB | Ilay Feingold | 16 | 0 | 2 | 0 | 1 | 0 | 0 | 0 | 19 | 0 |
| (France) | 27 | LB | Pierre Cornud | 0 | 0 | 0 | 0 | 1 | 0 | 2 | 0 | 3 | 0 |
| (Croatia) | 44 | CB | Lorenco Šimić | 0 | 0 | 0 | 0 | 1 | 0 | 2 | 1 | 3 | 1 |

=== Goals ===
| Rank | Position | Player | Ligat HaAl | State Cup | Toto Cup | UCEL | Total |
|---|---|---|---|---|---|---|---|
| 1 | CF | (Israel) Guy Melamed | 21 (Note: 17 as Hapoel Haifa Player) | 1 | 3 | 0 | 24 |
| 2 | AM | (Israel) Dia Saba | 16 | 0 | 3 | 0 | 19 |
| 3 | CF | (Israel) Dean David | 14 | 0 | 2 | 1 | 17 |
| 4 | AM | (Israel) Lior Refaelov | 10 | 0 | 0 | 1 | 11 |
| 5 | AM | (Curaçao) Xander Severina | 6 | 0 | 0 | 0 | 6 |
| 6 | CF | (Haiti) Frantzdy Pierrot | 1 | 0 | 0 | 2 | 3 |
| 6 | LM | (United States) Kenny Saief | 3 | 0 | 0 | 0 | 3 |
| 6 | LW | (Israel) Dolev Haziza | 2 | 0 | 0 | 1 | 3 |
| 9 | CB | (Ukraine) Oleksandr Syrota | 2 | 0 | 0 | 0 | 2 |
| 9 | AM | (Israel) Gadi Kinda | 0 | 1 | 1 | 0 | 2 |
| 9 | LW | (Israel) Eyad Khlaily | 1 | 1 | 0 | 0 | 2 |
| 9 | DM | (Israel) Ethan Azoulay | 0 | 2 | 0 | 0 | 2 |
| 9 | CF | (Israel) Omer Dahan | 0 | 2 | 0 | 0 | 2 |
| 14 | CB | (Croatia) Lorenco Šimić | 0 | 0 | 0 | 1 | 1 |
| 14 | LW | (Spain) Matías Nahuel | 0 | 1 | 0 | 0 | 1 |
| 14 | CB | (Senegal) Abdoulaye Seck | 1 | 0 | 0 | 0 | 1 |
| 14 | CF | (Brazil) Ricardinho | 1 | 0 | 0 | 0 | 1 |
| 14 | CB | (Israel) Elad Amir | 1 | 0 | 0 | 0 | 1 |
| Own goals | | | 3 | 0 | 0 | 0 | 3 |

=== Assist ===
| Rank | Position | Player | Ligat HaAl | State Cup | Toto Cup | UCEL | Total |
|---|---|---|---|---|---|---|---|
| 1 | AM | (Israel) Dia Saba | 14 | 0 | 0 | 0 | 14 |
| 2 | AM | (Israel) Gadi Kinda | 3 | 3 | 2 | 0 | 8 |
| 3 | LW | (Israel) Dolev Haziza | 7 | 0 | 0 | 0 | 7 |
| 4 | CF | (Israel) Dean David | 4 | 0 | 0 | 1 | 5 |
| 5 | LM | (United States) Kenny Saief | 2 | 1 | 0 | 1 | 4 |
| 5 | DM | (Niger) Ali Mohamed | 4 | 0 | 0 | 0 | 4 |
| 7 | AM | (Israel) Lior Refaelov | 2 | 0 | 0 | 1 | 3 |
| 7 | DM | (Israel) Mahmoud Jaber | 3 | 0 | 0 | 0 | 3 |
| 9 | LB | (France) Pierre Cornud | 0 | 0 | 0 | 2 | 2 |
| 9 | CF | (Haiti) Frantzdy Pierrot | 2 | 0 | 0 | 0 | 2 |
| 9 | CB | (Senegal) Abdoulaye Seck | 0 | 0 | 1 | 1 | 2 |
| 9 | RW | (Curaçao) Xander Severina | 1 | 1 | 0 | 0 | 2 |
| 9 | LB | (Democratic Republic of the Congo) Vital Nsimba | 2 | 0 | 0 | 0 | 2 |
| 14 | RB | (Israel) Roey Elimelech | 0 | 1 | 0 | 0 | 1 |
| 14 | LW | (Israel) Eyad Khlaily | 0 | 1 | 0 | 0 | 1 |
| 14 | DM | (Israel) Ethan Azoulay | 1 | 0 | 0 | 0 | 1 |

=== Clean sheets ===
| Rank | Pos. | No. | Name | Ligat HaAl | State Cup | Toto Cup | UCEL | Total |
|---|---|---|---|---|---|---|---|---|
| 1 | GK | 40 | (Israel) Shareef Kayouf | 10 | 1 | 0 | 0 | 11 |
| 2 | GK | 13 | (Argentina) Tomás Sultani | 0 | 1 | 1 | 0 | 2 |

=== Disciplinary record for Ligat Ha'Al and State Cup ===
| No. | Pos | Nat | Name | Ligat Ha'Al | | | State Cup | | | Total | | |
| No. | Pos | Nat | Name | Booked | (yellow card) (yellow-red card) | Sent off (straight red) | Booked | (yellow card) (yellow-red card) | Sent off (straight red) | Booked | (yellow card) (yellow-red card) | Sent off (straight red) |
|---|---|---|---|---|---|---|---|---|---|---|---|---|
| 30 | CB | (Senegal) | Abdoulaye Seck | 10 | | 1 | | | | 10 | | 1 |
| 10 | AM | (Israel) | Dia Saba | 10 | | | | | | 10 | | |
| 8 | LW | (Israel) | Dolev Haziza | 9 | | | 1 | | | 10 | | |
| 24 | DM | (Israel) | Ethan Azoulay | 7 | | | 1 | | | 8 | | |
| 21 | CF | (Israel) | Dean David | 5 | | | | | | 5 | | |
| 26 | DM | (Israel) | Mahmoud Jaber | 5 | | | | | | 5 | | |
| 4 | DM | (Niger) | Ali Mohamed | 6 | 1 | | | | | 6 | 1 | |
| 42 | RB | (Israel) | Roey Elimelech | 5 | | | | | | 5 | | |
| 11 | AM | (Israel) | Lior Refaelov | 4 | | | | | | 4 | | |
| 16 | LM | (United States) | Kenny Saief | 4 | | | | | | 4 | | |
| 40 | GK | (Israel) | Shareef Keouf | 3 | | | 1 | | | 4 | | |
| 7 | RW | (Curaçao) | Xander Severina | 4 | | | | | | 4 | | |
| 34 | CB | (Ukraine) | Oleksandr Syrota | 4 | | | | | | 4 | | |
| 28 | RW | (Israel) | Ilay Hagag | 3 | | | | | | 3 | | |
| 6 | AM | (Israel) | Gadi Kinda | 2 | | | 1 | | | 3 | | |
| 23 | RCB | (Israel) | Maor Kandil | 3 | | | | | | 3 | | |
| 18 | CF | (Israel) | Guy Melamed | 3 | | | | | | 3 | | |
| 44 | CB | (Brazil) | Pedrão | 3 | | | | | | 3 | | |
| 14 | LB | (Democratic Republic of the Congo) | Vital Nsimba | 3 | | | | | | 3 | | |
| 3 | CB | (Israel) | Sean Goldberg | 2 | | | | | | 2 | | |
| 33 | DM | (Israel) | Liam Hermesh | 1 | | | | | | 1 | | |
| 99 | CF | (Israel) | Ricardinho | 1 | | | | | | 1 | | |

=== Suspensions ===
| Player | Date Received | Offence | Length of suspension | | |
|---|---|---|---|---|---|
| (Israel) Shareef Keouf | 25 May 2024 | (red card) 70' vs Hapoel Haifa (H) (Previous Season) | 1 Matches | Hapoel Be'er Sheva (H) | 20 July 2024 |
| (Niger) Ali Mohamed | 25 May 2024 | (red card) 80' vs Hapoel Haifa (H) (Previous Season) | 2 Matches | Hapoel Be'er Sheva (H); Maccabi Netanya (H) | 20 July 2024; 17 August 2024 |
| (Niger) Ali Mohamed | 6 January 2025 | (yellow card) 45+9' (yellow-red card) 45+9' vs Beitar Jerusalem (H) | 3 Matches | Ironi Kiryat Shmona (H); Maccabi Netanya (H); Bnei Sakhnin (A) | 11 January 2025; 14 January 2025; 18 January 2025 |
| (Senegal) Abdoulaye Seck | 11 January 2025 | (yellow card) 27' vs Ironi Kiryat Shmona (H) | 1 Matches | Maccabi Netanya (H) | 14 January 2025 |
| (Israel) Dolev Haziza | 14 January 2025 | (yellow card) 58' vs Maccabi Netanya (H) | 1 Matches | Bnei Sakhnin (A) | 18 January 2025 |
| (Israel) Ethan Azoulay | 1 February 2025 | (yellow card) 30' vs Hapoel Hadera (A) | 1 Matches | Hapoel Haifa (H) | 10 February 2025 |
| (Israel) Dean David | 3 March 2025 | (yellow card) 45+5' vs Hapoel Be'er Sheva (A) | 1 Matches | F.C. Ashdod (H) | 9 March 2025 |
| (Senegal) Abdoulaye Seck | 16 March 2025 | (yellow card) 36' vs Beitar Jerusalem (H) | 1 Matches | Hapoel Haifa (A) | 29 March 2025 |
| (Israel) Dolev Haziza | 16 March 2025 | (yellow card) 45+1' vs Beitar Jerusalem (H) | 1 Matches | Hapoel Haifa (A) | 29 March 2025 |
| (Israel) Dia Saba | 29 March 2025 | (yellow card) 86' vs Hapoel Haifa (A) | 1 Matches | Hapoel Be'er Sheva (H) | 7 April 2025 |
| (Niger) Ali Mohamed | 3 May 2025 | (yellow card) 78' vs Hapoel Haifa (H) | 1 Matches | Hapoel Be'er Sheva (A) | 12 May 2025 |
| (Israel) Mahmoud Jaber | 3 May 2025 | (yellow card) 49' vs Hapoel Haifa (H) | 1 Matches | Hapoel Be'er Sheva (A) | 12 May 2025 |
| (Israel) Roey Elimelech | 19 May 2025 | (yellow card) 31' vs Maccabi Tel Aviv (H) | 1 Matches | Maccabi Netanya (A) | 24 May 2025 |
| (Senegal) Abdoulaye Seck | 19 May 2025 | (red card) 82' vs Maccabi Tel Aviv (H) | 1 Matches | Maccabi Netanya (A) | 24 May 2025 |

=== Penalties ===
| Date | Penalty Taker | Scored | Opponent | Competition |
|---|---|---|---|---|
| 4 November 2024 | (Israel) Lior Refaelov | Yes | Hapoel Haifa | Ligat Ha`Al |
| 4 November 2024 | (Israel) Dia Saba | Yes | Hapoel Haifa | Ligat Ha`Al |
| 15 December 2024 | (Israel) Dean David | No | Ironi Tiberias | Ligat Ha`Al |
| 25 December 2024 | (Israel) Dia Saba | No | Maccabi Tel Aviv | Toto Cup Al |
| 11 January 2025 | (Israel) Dia Saba | No | Ironi Kiryat Shmona | Ligat Ha`Al |
| 11 January 2025 | (Israel) Dolev Haziza | Yes | Ironi Kiryat Shmona | Ligat Ha`Al |
| 12 May 2025 | (Israel) Dia Saba | No | Hapoel Be'er Sheva | Ligat Ha`Al |

=== Overall ===
| | Total | Home | Away | Natural |
|---|---|---|---|---|
| Games played | 44 | 22 | 20 | 1 |
| Games won | 23 | 12 | 11 | 0 |
| Games drawn | 8 | 3 | 5 | 0 |
| Games lost | 13 | 8 | 4 | 1 |
| Biggest win | 6–0 vs Ironi Ashkelon | 6–0 vs Ironi Ashkelon | 4–0 vs Ironi Kiryat Shmona | — |
| Biggest loss | 1–5 vs Hapoel Haifa | 1–5 vs Hapoel Haifa | 1–4 vs vs Hapoel Be'er Sheva | 1–3 vs Maccabi Tel Aviv |
| Biggest win (League) | 4–0 vs Ironi Tiberias | 4–0 vs Ironi Tiberias | 4–0 vs Ironi Kiryat Shmona | N/A |
| Biggest loss (League) | 1–5 vs Hapoel Haifa | 1–5 vs Hapoel Haifa | 1–4 vs vs Hapoel Be'er Sheva | N/A |
| Biggest win (Cup) | 6–0 vs Ironi Ashkelon | 6–0 vs Ironi Ashkelon | — | — |
| Biggest loss (Cup) | 0–2 vs Hapoel Be'er Sheva | — | 0–2 vs Hapoel Be'er Sheva | — |
| Biggest win (Toto) | 3–0 vs Hapoel Be'er Sheva | 3–0 vs Hapoel Be'er Sheva | — | — |
| Biggest loss (Toto) | 1–3 vs Maccabi Tel Aviv | — | — | 1–3 vs Maccabi Tel Aviv |
| Biggest win (Europe) | 6–3 vs Sabah | — | 6–3 vs Sabah | — |
| Biggest loss (Europe) | 0–3 vs Sabah | 0–3 vs Sabah | — | — |
| Goals scored | 87 | 43 | 43 | 1 |
| Goals conceded | 66 | 33 | 30 | 3 |
| Goal difference | +21 | +10 | +13 | −2 |
| Average GF per game | 1.98 | 2 | 2.11 | 1 |
| Average GA per game | 1.5 | 1.52 | 1.32 | 3 |
| Clean sheets | 13 | 8 | 5 | 0 |
| Yellow cards | 109 | 54 | 51 | 4 |
| Red cards | 2 | 2 | 0 | 0 |
| Most appearances | Shareef Keouf (41) | | | |
| Most goals | Dia Saba (19) | | | |
| Most Assist | Dia Saba (14) | | | |
| Penalties for | 7 | 2 | 4 | 1 |
| Penalties scored | 3 | 1 | 2 | 0 |
| Penalties against | 7 | 4 | 3 | 0 |
| Penalties saved | 2 | 1 | 1 | 0 |
