= Oleksandr Syrota =

Ukrainian footballer

Oleksandr Syrota Олександр Сирота
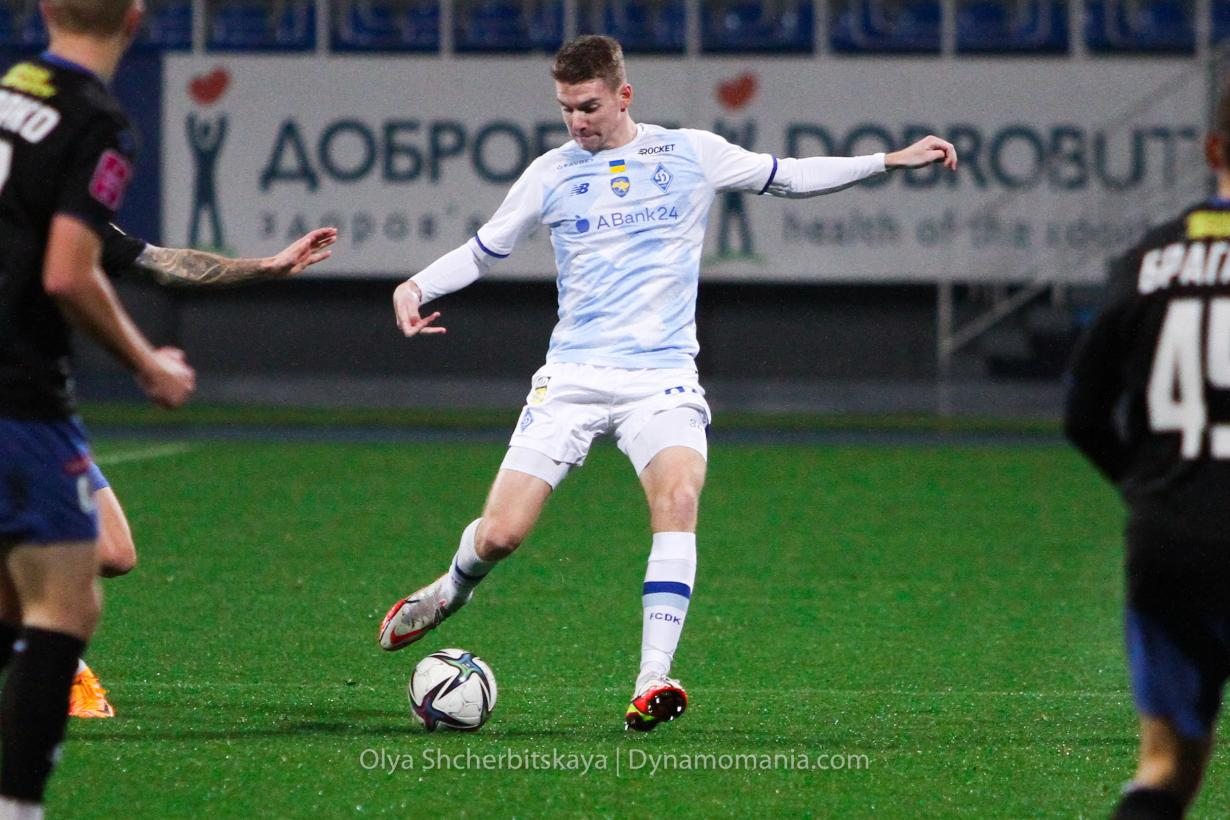

Personal information
- Full name: Oleksandr Mykhaylovych Syrota
- Date of birth: 11 June 2000 (age 26)
- Place of birth: Kyiv, Ukraine
- Height: 1.93 m (6 ft 4 in)
- Position: Centre-back

Team information
- Current team: Dynamo Kyiv

Youth career
- 2010–2019: Dynamo Kyiv

Senior career*
Years	Team	Apps	(Gls)
2019–	Dynamo Kyiv	58	(2)
2024–2025	→ Maccabi Haifa (loan)	22	(2)
2025–2026	→ Kocaelispor (loan)	6	(0)
2026	→ Amedspor (loan)	16	(0)

International career^{‡}
2017	Ukraine U17	1	(0)
2020–2023	Ukraine U21	10	(1)
2021–	Ukraine	2	(0)
Medal record
Men's football
Representing Ukraine
UEFA European Under-21 Championship
Bronze medal – third place	2023 Georgia-Romania
- * Club domestic league appearances and goals as of 5 May 2026 ‡ National team caps and goals as of 8 June 2022

Oleksandr Mykhaylovych Syrota (Ukrainian: Олександр Михайлович Сирота; born 11 June 2000) is a Ukrainian professional footballer who plays as a centre-back for Dynamo Kyiv.

== Club career ==
Born in Kyiv, Syrota is a product of the Dynamo Kyiv youth sportive school.

He played for FC Dynamo in the Ukrainian Premier League Reserves and in December 2019 he was promoted to the senior squad team. Syrota made his debut in the Ukrainian Premier League for Dynamo Kyiv only on 4 July 2020, playing in a losing home match against FC Shakhtar Donetsk.

On 11 July 2024, Syrota signed for Maccabi Haifa on a on year loan deal.

== International career ==
In 2017, Syrota was a member of the Ukraine U17's squad, that participated at the UEFA European Under-17 Championship in Croatia, but not appeared in any game.

Also he was called up for the Ukraine U21's matches in March 2020, but they were cancelled due to the COVID-19 pandemic.

He made his Ukraine national football team debut on 8 September 2021 in a friendly against the Czech Republic, a 1–1 away draw.

== Career statistics ==
=== Club ===
As of 12 December 2021

Club	Season	League			National Cup		Continental		Other		Total	
Club	Season	Division	Apps	Goals	Apps	Goals	Apps	Goals	Apps	Goals	Apps	Goals
Dynamo Kyiv	2019–20	Ukrainian Premier League	2	0	1	0	0	0	0	0	3	0
Dynamo Kyiv	2020–21	Ukrainian Premier League	10	0	2	0	3 (Note: Appearance(s) in UEFA Europa League)	0	1 (Note: Appearance(s) in Ukrainian Super Cup)	0	16	0
Dynamo Kyiv	2021–22	Ukrainian Premier League	12	1	0	0	5 (Note: Appearance(s) in UEFA Champions League)	0	1	0	18	1
Dynamo Kyiv	2022–23	Ukrainian Premier League	19	1	0	0	9	0	0	0	28	1
Dynamo Kyiv	2023–24	Ukrainian Premier League	15	0	1	0	4 (Note: Appearance(s) in UEFA Conference League)	0	1	0	21	0
Dynamo Kyiv	Total		58	2	4	0	21	0	3	0	86	2
Maccabi Haifa	2024–25	Israeli Premier League	0	0	0	0	0	0	0	0	0	0
Maccabi Haifa	Total		0	0	0	0	0	0	0	0	0	0
Career total			58	2	4	0	21	0	3	0	86	2

=== International ===
As of 8 June 2022

National team	Year	Caps	Goals
Ukraine	2021	1	0
Ukraine	2022	1	0
Total		2	0

== Honours ==
Dynamo Kyiv

- Ukrainian Premier League: 2020–21
- Ukrainian Cup: 2019–20, 2020–21
- Ukrainian Super Cup: 2020
