= Kenny Saief =

American soccer player

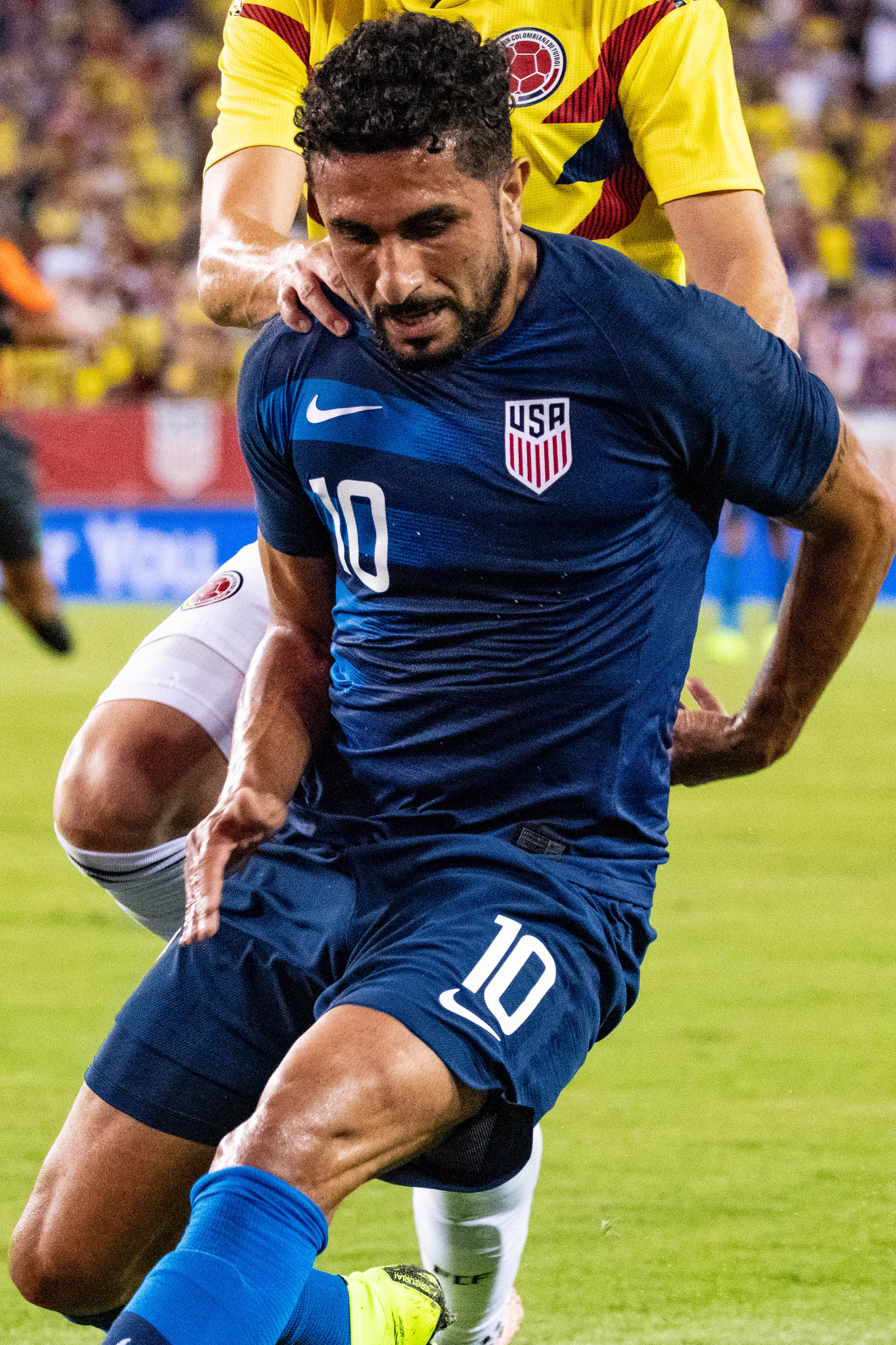
- Saief with the United States in 2017

Personal information
- Full name: Kenneth Hasan Saief
- Date of birth: December 17, 1993 (age 32)
- Place of birth: Panama City, Florida, U.S.
- Height: 5 ft 9 in (1.76 m)
- Position: Left midfielder

Team information
- Current team: Maccabi Haifa
- Number: 16

Youth career
- 2005–2006: Maccabi Haifa
- 2006–2008: Hapoel Haifa
- 2008: Maccabi Netanya
- 2008–2010: Beitar Nes Tubruk
- 2010–2011: TSV 1860 München
- 2011: Bnei Sakhnin

Senior career*
Years	Team	Apps	(Gls)
2010–2011	Bnei Sakhnin	6	(1)
2011–2012	Hapoel Haifa	3	(0)
2012–2013	Ironi Kiryat Shmona	2	(0)
2013–2014	Hapoel Ramat HaSharon	28	(9)
2014–2018	Gent	81	(13)
2018	→ Anderlecht (loan)	17	(1)
2018–2022	Anderlecht	12	(0)
2019	→ FC Cincinnati (loan)	9	(1)
2020–2021	→ Lechia Gdańsk (loan)	33	(1)
2021–2022	→ Ashdod (loan)	30	(4)
2022–2023	Neftçi	46	(5)
2023–	Maccabi Haifa	72	(8)

International career
2008–2009	Israel U16	9	(1)
2011	Israel U18	8	(0)
2011	Israel U19	2	(2)
2013–2015	Israel U21	2	(0)
2016	Israel	2	(0)
2017–2018	United States	4	(0)
- * Club domestic league appearances and goals as of June 23, 2026

Kenneth Hasan Saief (Arabic: كينيث حسن "كيني" سيف, Hebrew: קנת' חסן "קני" סייף; born December 17, 1993) is an American professional soccer player who plays as a left midfielder for Israeli Premier League club Maccabi Haifa. He played for Israel internationally at both youth and senior levels, before switching allegiance to the United States.

== Early life ==
Saief was born in Panama City, Florida, U.S., to Druze-Israeli parents; the family returned to Israel when he was three.

== Club career ==
Saief began his professional career with Bnei Sakhnin in 2011, before he was transferred to Hapoel Haifa one season later. The next year, he moved to Hapoel Ironi Kiryat Shmona and reached the final of the Israel State Cup. Saief made only two appearances however, which resulted in a transfer to Ironi Nir Ramat HaSharon. There he gained more playing opportunities.

Saief attracted the attention of Belgian Pro League team K.A.A. Gent, who signed him for a three-year deal on August 8, 2014. Saief's first season at the club saw him with the Belgian Pro League title. After four seasons at Gent, Saief officially signed to Anderlecht in May 2018.

On March 6, 2019, Saief was loaned to FC Cincinnati of Major League Soccer. On March 24, 2019, Saief scored his first MLS goal against the New England Revolution. On June 11, 2019, Saief's loan was terminated due to injury complications.

On February 12, 2020, he was loaned to Polish Ekstraklasa's Lechia Gdańsk until the end of 2019–20 season.

On July 1, 2022, Saief signed a two-year contract with Azerbaijan Premier League club Neftçi. On December 14, 2023, Saief left Neftçi.

On December 19, 2023, signed for Maccabi Haifa.

== International career ==
Saief has represented the Israel national team at various youth levels. He reportedly stated that he expected to play for the United States national team, although he was called up to the Israel national team and made his debut in a friendly 2–1 loss to Croatia.

On June 3, 2017, Saief was called up by the United States as part of their 40-man preliminary roster for the 2017 CONCACAF Gold Cup. As part of his callup, Saief filed a one-time switch with FIFA, tying him permanently to the US program.

On June 22, 2017, U.S. Soccer confirmed that Saief had been approved by FIFA for a change of association.

He was chosen to make his first start for the United States against Paraguay on March 27, 2018.

== Career statistics ==
As of match played August 14, 2025

Appearances and goals by club, season and competition
Club	Season	League			National cup (Note: Includes Israeli State Cup, Belgian Cup, Polish Cup, Azerbaijan Cup)		League cup (Note: Includes Toto Cup)		Europe		Total	
Club	Season	Division	Apps	Goals	Apps	Goals	Apps	Goals	Apps	Goals	Apps	Goals
Bnei Sakhnin	2010–11	Israeli Premier League	6	0	0	0	0	0	—		6	0
Hapoel Haifa	2012–13	Israeli Premier League	3	0	0	0	1	0	—		4	0
Ironi Kiryat Shmona	2012–13	Israeli Premier League	2	0	0	0	—		0	0	2	0
Ramat HaSharon	2013–14	Israeli Premier League	28	9	3	1	0	0	—		31	10
Gent	2014–15	Belgian Pro League	20	2	4	1	—		—		24	3
Gent	2015–16	Belgian Pro League	28	4	1	0	—		8 (Note: One appearance in the Belgian Super Cup and seven in the UEFA Champions League)	0	37	4
Gent	2016–17	Belgian First Division A	31	7	3	0	—		13 (Note: Appearances in UEFA Europa League)	1	47	8
Gent	2017–18	Belgian First Division A	3	0	2	0	—		0	0	5	0
Gent	Total		82	13	10	1	—		21	1	113	15
Anderlecht (loan)	2017–18	Belgian First Division A	17	1	—		—		—		17	1
Anderlecht	2018–19	Belgian First Division A	12	0	0	0	—		5	0	17	0
Anderlecht	2020–21	Belgian First Division A	0	0	0	0	—		0	0	0	0
Anderlecht	Total		29	1	0	0	—		5	0	34	1
FC Cincinnati (loan)	2019	Major League Soccer	9	1	0	0	0	0	0	0	9	0
Lechia Gdańsk (loan)	2019–20	Ekstraklasa	11	1	0	0	—		—		11	1
Lechia Gdańsk (loan)	2020–21	Ekstraklasa	22	0	1	0	—		—		23	0
Lechia Gdańsk (loan)	Total		33	1	1	0	—		0	0	34	1
Ashdod (loan)	2021–22	Israeli Premier League	30	4	1	0	0	0	0	0	31	4
Neftçi	2022–23	Azerbaijan Premier League	32	4	5	0	—		4 (Note: Appearance(s) in UEFA Conference League)	2	41	6
Neftçi	2023–24	Azerbaijan Premier League	14	1	0	0	—		4	1	18	2
Neftçi	Total		46	5	5	0	—		8	3	59	8
Maccabi Haifa	2023–24	Israeli Premier League	20	0	3	0	1	0	3	0	27	0
Maccabi Haifa	2024–25	Israeli Premier League	26	3	2	0	2	0	1	0	31	3
Maccabi Haifa	2025–26	Israeli Premier League	0	0	0	0	0	0	3	0	3	0
Maccabi Haifa	Total		46	3	5	0	3	0	7	0	61	3
Career total			314	37	25	2	4	0	41	4	384	43

== Honors ==
Gent

- Belgian Pro League: 2014–15
- Belgian Super Cup: 2015

== See also ==
- List of Israeli Druze
