= Tomás Sultani =

Argentinian footballer

Personal information
- Date of birth: 22 June 1998 (age 28)
- Place of birth: Garín, Buenos Aires, Argentina
- Height: 1.85 m (6 ft 1 in)
- Position: Goalkeeper

Senior career*
| Years | Team | Apps | (Gls) |
| 2020–2021 | Real Pilar | 0 | (0) |
| 2022 | San Telmo | 15 | (0) |
| 2023–2024 | Arsenal de Sarandí | 17 | (0) |
| 2024–2025 | Maccabi Haifa | 1 | (0) |
| 2025–2026 | Tigre | 1 | (0) |
- * Club domestic league appearances and goals as of 16:45, 3 June 2026 (UTC)

Tomás Ezequiel Sultani (born 22 June 1998) is an Argentinian professional footballer who plays as a goalkeeper.

== Playing career ==
Sultani was born in Garín, Buenos Aires to an Argentinian-Jewish family. He is a product of the youth academies of Real Pilar. In the 2018–2019 season he made his debut in the senior team and he qualified for the fourth league after two seasons he was relegated with the team back to the fifth league . After three seasons in 2021, he signed with the San Telmo from the second division, he made his debut in February 2022. At the end of the season, he joined the Arsenal de Sarandí from the Argentine Primera División. At the end of the season, he was relegated with a team to the second league. On June 6, 2024, he signed with Maccabi Haifa until the end of the season, with an option for another season.
