= Ataa Jaber =

Palestinian footballer (born 1994)

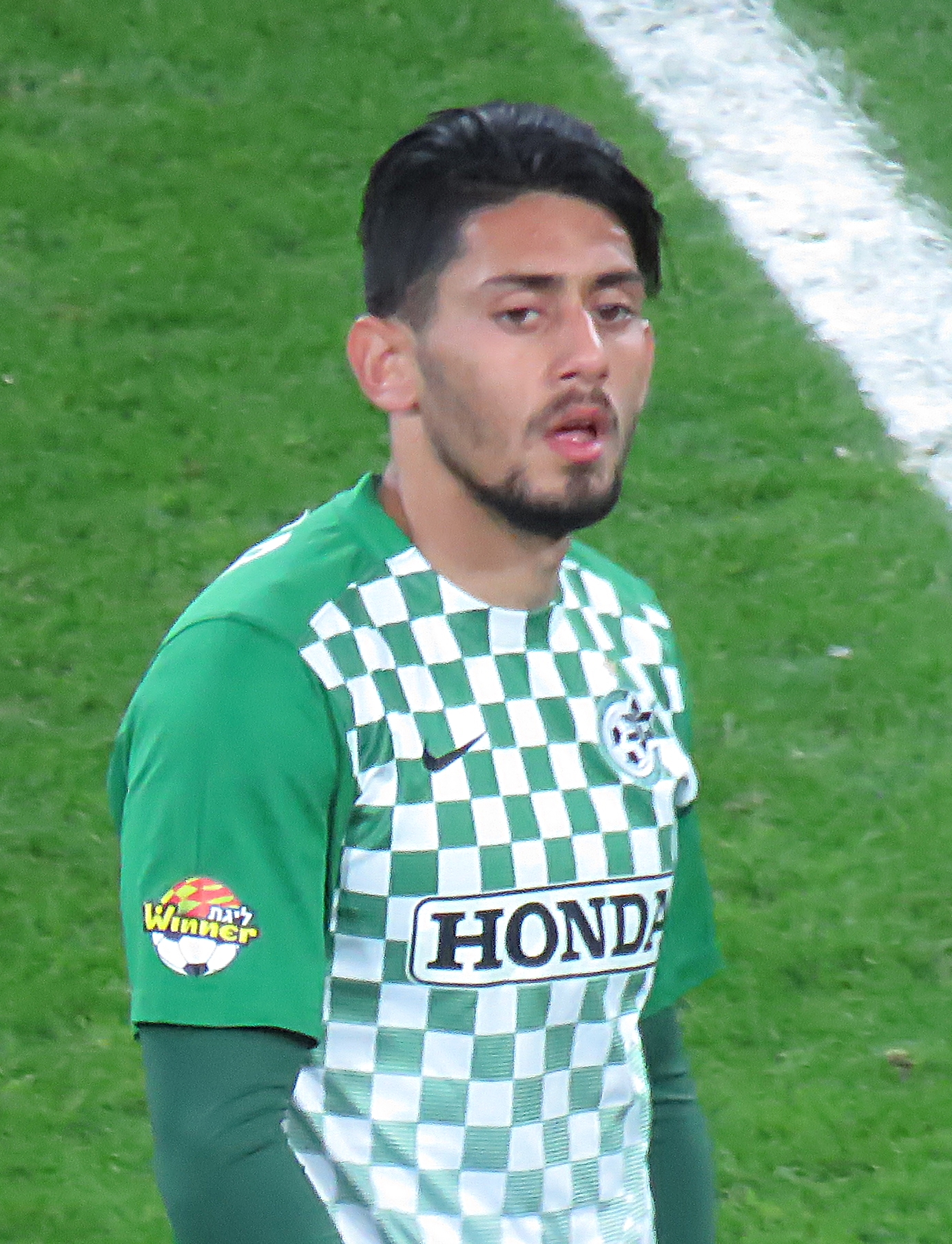
- Jaber playing for Maccabi Haifa in 2016

Personal information
- Full name: Ataa Jaber
- Date of birth: 3 October 1994 (age 32)
- Place of birth: Majd al-Krum, Israel
- Height: 1.76 m (5 ft 9 in)
- Position: Defensive midfielder

Youth career
- 2005–2014: Maccabi Haifa

Senior career*
Years	Team	Apps	(Gls)
2012–2017	Maccabi Haifa	44	(1)
2015	→ Bnei Sakhnin (loan)	10	(1)
2017–2021	Bnei Sakhnin	100	(6)
2021–2022	F.C. Ashdod	30	(2)
2022–2024	Neftchi Baku	45	(8)
2024–2025	Qatar	14	(2)

International career^{‡}
2015–2017	Israel U21	8	(2)
2023–	Palestine	7	(0)
- * Club domestic league appearances and goals as of 10 January 2025 ‡ National team caps and goals as of 20 January 2024

Ataa Jaber (Arabic: عطاء جابر, Hebrew: עטאא ג'אבר; born 3 October 1994) is a professional footballer who plays as a defensive midfielder. Born in Israel, he plays for the Palestine national team.

== Early life ==
Jaber was born in Majd al-Krum, Israel, to a Muslim-Arab family.

== Club career ==
Ataa Jaber got his professional start with Maccabi Haifa making his senior team debut at 17 years old in the 2011–12 season. Unable to reserve a place in the first team, Ataa Jaber signed for Bnei Sakhnin during the 2016–17 season.

He moved to F.C. Ashdod in 2021 on a one-year deal.

In 2022, Jaber made his first move to a foreign league signing with Azerbaijan Premier League club Neftchi Baku.

== International career ==
Jaber had represented and captained the Israel national U21 team. However, in 2023, he filed for a nationality switch to represent Palestine internationally. He debuted in a friendly 0–0 tie with Indonesia on 14 June.

After the October 7 attacks, Israeli Interior Minister Moshe Arbel called for Jaber's Israeli citizenship to be revoked.

== Career statistics ==
=== Club ===
As of 28 May 2024

Club	Season	League			National Cup		League Cup		Continental		Total	
Club	Season	Division	Apps	Goals	Apps	Goals	Apps	Goals	Apps	Goals	Apps	Goals
Maccabi Haifa	2011-12	Israeli Premier League	1	0	—		—		—		1	0
Maccabi Haifa	2012-13	Israeli Premier League	8	0	—		—		—		8	0
Maccabi Haifa	2014-15	Israeli Premier League	13	0	1	0	7	0	—		21	0
Maccabi Haifa	2015-16	Israeli Premier League	19	1	4	0	6	1	—		29	2
Maccabi Haifa	2016-17	Israeli Premier League	3	0	—		1	0	0	0	4	0
Maccabi Haifa	Total		44	1	5	0	14	1	0	0	63	2
Bnei Sakhnin (loan)	2014-15	Israeli Premier League	10	1	—		—		—		10	1
Bnei Sakhnin	2016-17	Israeli Premier League	6	0	—		—		—		6	0
Bnei Sakhnin	2017-18	Israeli Premier League	23	2	1	0	2	0	—		26	2
Bnei Sakhnin	2018-19	Israeli Premier League	18	1	1	1	4	0	—		23	2
Bnei Sakhnin	2019-20	Liga Leumit	23	1	—		—		—		23	1
Bnei Sakhnin	2020-21	Israeli Premier League	30	2	1	0	4	1	—		35	3
Bnei Sakhnin	Total		100	6	3	1	10	1	—		113	8
F.C. Ashdod	2021-22	Israeli Premier League	30	2	0	0	—		—		30	2
Neftchi Baku	2022-23	Azerbaijan Premier League	28	5	5	0	—		4 (Note: Appearance(s) in UEFA Europa Conference League)	1	37	6
Neftchi Baku	2023-24	Azerbaijan Premier League	17	3	0	0	—		4	0	21	3
Neftchi Baku	Total		45	8	5	0	—		8	1	58	9
Career Total			229	18	13	1	24	2	8	1	274	22

== Honours ==
=== Club ===
Maccabi Haifa

- Israel State Cup (1): 2015–16

Netchi Baku

- Azerbaijan Cup (1): Runner-Up 2022-23 Azerbaijan Cup
