= Ramin Nasirli =

Azerbaijani footballer (born 2002)

Personal information
- Date of birth: 24 September 2002 (age 24)
- Place of birth: Azerbaijan
- Height: 1.72 m (5 ft 8 in)
- Position: Midfielder

Team information
- Current team: Shafa Baku
- Number: 29

Youth career
- Neftçi Baku

Senior career*
Years	Team	Apps	(Gls)
2022–2023	Neftçi Baku	5	(1)
2023	→ Daugavpils (loan)	36	(3)
2024–2025	Araz-Naxçıvan	11	(0)
2025–	Shafa Baku	9	(0)

International career^{‡}
2017	Azerbaijan U16	1	(0)
2022–2024	Azerbaijan U21	10	(1)
Medal record
Men's football
Representing Azerbaijan
Islamic Solidarity Games
Bronze medal – third place	2021 Konya
- * Club domestic league appearances and goals as of 25 December 2025 ‡ National team caps and goals as of 11 June 2024

Ramin Nasirli (Azerbaijani: Ramin Nəsirli; born 24 September 2002) is an Azerbaijani footballer who plays as a midfielder for Azerbaijan First League club Shafa Baku.

== Club career ==
On 19 February 2022, Nasirli made his debut in the Azerbaijan Premier League for Neftçi Baku, winning 3–1 against Shamakhi.
