= List of Hapoel Haifa F.C. seasons =

This is a list of seasons played by Hapoel Haifa Football Club in Israeli and European football, from 1928 (when the club joined the newly founded EIFA) to the most recent completed season. It details the club's achievements in major competitions, and the top scorers for each season. Top scorers in bold were also the top scorers in the Israeli league that season. Records of minor competitions such as the Lilian Cup are not included due to them being considered of less importance than the State Cup and the Toto Cup.

The club has won the League championship Once, the State Cup 3 times and the Toto Cup (for top division clubs) twice, as well as the Israeli 10th Anniversary Cup. The club has never been out of the two top divisions of Israeli football.

== History ==
Hapoel Haifa Football Club was established on 24 April 1924 in Haifa. In 1928 the club joined the EIFA and competed in its competitions ever since. The club played in the top division until the end of the 1980–81 season, when the club relegated to the second division for the first time in its existence. In 1998–99, the club won its first league championship.

== Seasons ==
Season	League									State Cup	League Cup	Super Cup	Europe	Top goalscorer (Note: Goals in all competitions (Liga Leumit or Liga Al, State Cup, Toto Cup and European) are counted.)	
Season	Division	P	W	D	L	F	A	Pts	Pos	State Cup	League Cup	Super Cup	Europe	Name	Goals
1927–28	–	–	–	–	–	–	–	–	–	SF	–	–	–		
1928–29	–	–	–	–	–	–	–	–	–	SF	–	–	–		
1929–30	–	–	–	–	–	–	–	–	–	R1 (A team); QF (B team) (Note: Hapoel Haifa entered two teams to the competition.)	–	–	–		
1930–31	Pal. League (Note: The 1930–31 league season was abandoned after several weeks due to tensions between the British Mandate government and the Jewish community following the publication of the Passfield white paper.)	5	1	2	2	6	10	4	6th	–	–	–	–		
1931–32	Pal. League	12	8	2	2	33	15	18	3rd	Final	–	–	–		
1932–33	–	–	–	–	–	–	–	–	–	SF	–	–	–		
1933–34	Pal. League	11	4	4	3	23	18	12	4th	SF	–	–	–		
1934–35	Pal. League (Note: The 1934–35 league season was stopped to allow Maccabi club to prepare for the 1935 Maccabiah Games and wasn't renewed due to disagreement between Maccabi and Hapoel)	6	2	0	4	10	13	4	7th	SF	–	–	–		
1935–36	Pal. League (Note: The 1935–36 league season was held from7 December 1935 to 18 December 1936.)	10	4	2	4	16	13	10	4th	– (Note: After three matches played in the first round the competition was abandoned due to the Arab Revolt.)	–	–	–		
1936–37	Pal. League	10	4	2	4	16	13	10	4th	QF	–	–	–		
1937–38	Pal. League	8	2	1	5	13	22	5	4th	SF	–	–	–		
1938–39	Pal. League (Note: The 1938–39 league season was abandoned after playing one round of matches due to the Arab Revolt.)	8	4	1	3	15	17	9	4th	–	–	–	–		
1939–40	Pal. League	14	5	2	7	22	34	12	5th	QF	–	–	–		
1940–41	–	–	–	–	–	–	–	–	–	R2	–	–	–		
1941–42	Pal. League; Haifa (Note: The 1941–42 league season was held in three regional divisions followed by a play-off. The Haifa division was abandoned during the season.)	3	1	0	2	6	6	2	4th	2R	–	–	–		
1942–43	–	–	–	–	–	–	–	–	–	QF	–	–	–		
1943–44	–	–	–	–	–	–	–	–	–	QF (Note: The 1944 cup competitions began on 5 February 1944 and was completed during the following season, on 13 January 1945.)	–	–	–		
1944–45	Pal. League; Northern	12	5	3	4	24	19	13	3rd	QF	–	–	–		
1945–46	–	–	–	–	–	–	–	–	–	QF	–	–	–		
1946–47	Pal. League	26	9	7	10	57	44	25	8th	R2	–	–	–		
1947–48	Pal. League (Note: The 1947–48 league was abandoned due to the 1948 Arab–Israeli War.)	3	2	1	0	14	9	5	7th	–	–	–	–		
1948–49	Isr. League (Note: The 1949–50 league began in May 1949 and ended on 24 June 1950.)	24	16	4	4	53	30	36	3rd	Final (Note: The 1949 cup competition was delayed by appeals after the completion of the quarter-finals. After settling the appeals three further matches were played in February 1951, during which the club won its matches against Hapoel Ramat Gan and qualified to the final, but the competition was abandoned.)	–	–	–		
1949–50	Isr. League	24	16	4	4	53	30	36	3rd	Final	–	–	–		
1950–51	–	–	–	–	–	–	–	–	–	Final	–	–	–		
1951–52	Alef	22	14	1	7	46	26	29	3rd	Round of 16	–	–	–		
1952–53	–	–	–	–	–	–	–	–	–	SF	–	–	–		
1953–54	Alef	22	7	4	11	26	37	18	9th	SF	–	–	–		
1954–55	Alef	26	9	6	11	40	55	24	9th	QF	–	–	–	Ze'ev Schneid	6
1955–56	Leumit	22	9	4	9	32	39	22	6th	–	–	–	–	Avraham Ginzburg; Avraham Nestenfober; Ze'ev Schneid	10
1956–57	Leumit	18	7	0	11	22	38	14	8th	Round of 16	–	–	–		
1957–58	Leumit	22	7	5	10	33	32	19	7th	Final	–	–	–		
1958–59	Leumit	22	15	3	4	46	23	31	2nd	QF	Winners	–	–		
1959–60	Leumit	22	10	6	6	46	24	26	3rd	QF	–	–	–		
1960–61	Leumit	22	12	5	5	44	25	29	3rd	QF	–	–	–		
1961–62	Leumit	22	8	6	8	34	27	22	8th	R5	–	–	–		
1962–63	Leumit	22	6	5	11	20	26	17	12th	Winners	–	–	–		
1963–64	Leumit	28	11	7	10	41	31	29	6th	Final	–	–	–		
1964–65	Leumit	30	12	8	10	48	38	32	5th	Round of 16	–	–	–		
1965–66	Leumit	30	12	8	10	37	31	32	7th	Winners	–	–	–		
1966–67	Leumit	60	27	16	17	72	47	70	3rd	Round of 16	–	**Runners-up**	–		
1967–68	Leumit	60	27	16	17	72	47	70	3rd	R5	–	–	–		
1968–69	Leumit	30	11	15	4	34	16	37	4th	SF	Group	–	–		
1969–70	Leumit	30	7	14	9	19	18	28	10th	QF	–	–	–		
1970–71	Leumit	30	9	13	8	32	25	31	6th	QF	–	–	–		
1971–72	Leumit	30	14	8	8	37	18	36	6th	QF	–	–	–		
1972–73	Leumit	30	9	12	9	31	28	30	7th	Round of 16	SF	–	–		
1973–74	Leumit	30	12	8	10	31	44	32	6th	Winners	–	–	–		
1974–75	Leumit	30	12	11	7	38	26	35	3rd	R4	–	**Runners-up**	–		
1975–76	Leumit	34	13	12	9	30	24	38	3rd	QF	QF	–	–		
1976–77	Leumit	30	9	11	10	26	24	29	9th	R6	–	–	–		
1977–78	Leumit	26	8	7	11	19	29	23	12th	Round of 16	–	–	–		
1978–79	Leumit	30	9	13	8	27	24	31	5th	Round of 16	–	–	–		
1979–80	Leumit	30	8	11	11	22	33	27	12th	Round of 16	–	–	–		
1980–81	Leumit	30	8	10	12	30	44	26	14th	R7	–	–	–		
1981–82	Artzit	30	9	11	10	34	27	29	6th	R7	–	–	–		
1982–83	Artzit	30	14	9	7	36	30	51	4th	R6	–	–	–		
1983–84	Artzit	30	15	9	6	43	24	54	1st	QF	–	–	–		
1984–85	Leumit	30	11	11	8	30	26	44	5th	Round of 16	Group	–	–		
1985–86	Leumit	30	6	6	18	24	60	24	15th	Round of 16	Group	–	–		
1986–87	Artzit	30	13	11	6	40	23	50	3rd	R7	Winners	–	–		
1987–88	Artzit	33	18	8	7	32	23	62	3rd	Round of 16	Group	–	–		
1988–89	Artzit	33	8	15	10	33	39	39	7th	R7	Group	–	–		
1989–90	Artzit	30	8	11	11	28	37	35	9th	R7	Final group	–	–		
1990–91	Artzit	30	10	9	11	25	33	39	10th	R7	Group	–	–		
1991–92	Artzit	30	18	6	6	48	28	60	2nd	R8	Group	–	–		
1992–93	Leumit	33	11	7	15	42	51	40	7th	R8	Group	–	–		
1993–94	Leumit	39	7	13	19	39	80	34	13th	QF	Group	–	–		
1994–95	Leumit	30	8	9	13	45	51	33	13th	Final	SF	–	–		
1995–96	Leumit	30	19	7	4	66	33	64	4th	Round of 16	Group	–	–		
1996–97	Leumit	30	12	7	11	34	33	43	7th	Round of 16	Final	–	Intertoto, Group		
1997–98	Leumit	30	17	9	4	59	27	60	3rd	Round of 16	Group	–	–		
1998–99	Leumit	30	22	5	3	66	23	71	1st	QF	SF	–	Intertoto, R1		
1999–2000	Premier	39	13	18	8	53	36	57	7th	Round of 16	QF	–	CL, QR3; UEFA Cup, R2	Amir Turgeman	14
2000–01	Premier	38	20	11	7	59	38	71	3rd	Round of 16	Winners	–	–	Amir Turgeman	13
2001–02	Premier	33	7	9	17	35	50	30	11th	R8	R2	–	Intertoto, R2	Eli Abarbanel, Oren Nisim	7
2002–03	Leumit	33	11	7	15	37	37	40	6th	Round of 16	Group	–	–		
2003–04	Leumit	33	16	7	10	44	32	55	1st	Final	Group	–	–		
2004–05	Premier	33	9	8	16	36	44	35	11th	QF	Group	–	–	Jeff Tutuana	9
2005–06	Leumit	33	11	14	8	40	28	47	6th	R9	SF	–	–		
2006–07	Leumit	33	14	5	14	43	43	47	3rd	QF	Group	–	–	Yuval Avidor	19
2007–08	Leumit	33	15	7	11	36	29	52	3rd	R9	SF	–	–	Eden Ben Basat	15
2008–09	Leumit	33	17	11	5	44	29	62	1st	R9	QF	–	–	Eran Levi	13
2009–10	Premier	35	10	9	16	44	50	23 (Note: Hapoel Haifa achieved 32 points in the regular season, which were halved at the beginning of the play-offs. The club scored 7 more points during the play-offs for a total of 39 points.)	11th	R8	Group	–	–	Eran Levi	13
2010–11	Premier	33	12	8	13	40	43	22 (Note: Hapoel Haifa achieved 44 points in the regular seasons, which were halved at the beginning of the play-offs. The club didn't score any point during the play-offs, which puts the total of points for the season on 44 points.)	10th	QF	Group	–	–	Eden Ben Basat	20
2011–12	Premier	37	11	11	15	41	43	44	12th	R8	Group	–	–	Yuval Avidor	13
2012–13	Premier	33	9	12	12	36	45	39	9th	Round of 16	Winners	–	–	Vladimir Gluščević; Mahran Lala	10
2013–14	Premier	33	9	7	17	30	45	34	11th	Round of 16	–	–	–	Žarko Korać	12
2014–15	Premier	33	9	7	17	25	47	34	12th	R8	SF	–	–	Mahran Lala	13
2015–16	Premier	33	7	13	13	38	48	34	12th	Round of 16	QF	–	–	Mahran Lala	11
2016–17	Premier	33	10	7	16	39	46	37	8th	QF	SF	–	–	Mahran Lala	9
2017–18	Premier	36	17	11	8	48	39	62	4th	Winners	Group	–	–	Alon Turgeman; Eden Ben Basat	12
2018–19	Premier	33	8	13	12	44	47	37	11th	R8	3rd	Winners	Europa League, QR3	Ness Zamir	6
2019–20	Premier	36	12	11	13	39	46	47	6th	QF	12th	—	—	Ness Zamir	7
2020–21	Premier	33	11	9	13	40	48	42	9th	Round of 16	14th	—	—	Hanan Maman	8
2021–22	Premier	33	9	8	16	36	47	35	11th	SF	3rd	—	—	Alen Ožbolt; Alon Turgeman	11
2022–23	Premier	33	9	14	10	35	35	41	7th	Round of 16	14th	—	—	Alon Turgeman	7
2023–24	Premier	36	18	5	13	48	47	59	4th	Round of 16	9th	—	—	Guy Melamed	11
2024–25	Premier	36	15	7	14	51	50	52	5th	Round of 16	14th	—	—	Guy Melamed	17

== Key ==
- P = Played
- W = Games won
- D = Games drawn
- L = Games lost
- F = Goals for
- A = Goals against
- Pts = Points
- Pos = Final position
- Leumit = Liga Leumit (National League)
- Artzit = Liga Artzit (Nationwide League)
- Premier = Liga Al (Premier League)
- Pal. League = Palestine League
- F = Final
- Group = Group stage
- QF = Quarter-finals
- QR1 = First Qualifying Round
- QR2 = Second Qualifying Round
- QR3 = Third Qualifying Round
- QR4 = Fourth Qualifying Round
- RInt = Intermediate Round
- R1 = Round 1
- R2 = Round 2
- R3 = Round 3
- R4 = Round 4
- R5 = Round 5
- R6 = Round 6
- SF = Semi-finals

Champions	Runners-up	Promoted	Relegated
