= 2023–24 Hapoel Haifa F.C. season =

Hapoel Haifa
2023–24 season
- Owner: Yoav Katz
- Chairman: Yoav Katz
- Manager: Ronny Levy
- Stadium: Sammy Ofer
- Toto Cup: 9th
- Top goalscorer: League: Guy Melamed (5); All: Guy Melamed (4)
- Biggest win: 2–0 (vs Maccabi Bnei Reineh F.C. Ashdod, 17 September 2023)
- Biggest defeat: 1–2 (vs Hapoel Hadera, 2 August 2023)
Home colours	Away colours	Third colours
- All statistics correct as of 18 December 2021.

Hapoel Haifa Football Club is an Israeli football club located in Haifa. During the 2023–24 campaign the club have competed in the Israeli Premier League, State Cup and Toto Cup.

== Club ==
=== Kits ===
- Provider: Diadora
- Main Sponsor: Leos Media
- Secondary Sponsor: Almog, Shorashim

Home	Away	3rd

== First team ==
No.	Pos.	Nation	Player
1	GK	(Israel) ISR	Yoav Gerafi
2	DF	(Israel) ISR	Noam Ben Harush
3	DF	(Israel) ISR	Reef Amsalem
4	DF	(Israel) ISR	Dor Malul (Captain)
5	DF	(Republic of the Congo) CGO	Fernand Mayembo
7	FW	(Liberia) LBR	Mohammed Kamara
9	MF	(Israel) ISR	Shoval Gozlan
10	FW	(Israel) ISR	Tomer Yosefi
11	FW	(Brazil) BRA	Felipe Santos
12	DF	(Israel) ISR	Oren Biton
13	GK	(Israel) ISR	Niv Antman
16	FW	(Israel) ISR	Niv Tubul
17	FW	(Israel) ISR	Itay Buganim

No.	Pos.	Nation	Player
18	FW	(Israel) ISR	Guy Melamed
19	MF	(Israel) ISR	Bar Lin
20	MF	(Israel) ISR	Itamar Noy
22	DF	(Israel) ISR	Inon Eliyahu
24	DF	(Israel) ISR	Liran Serdal
25	DF	(Israel) ISR	George Diba
26	MF	(Israel) ISR	Yasmao Cabeda
30	FW	(Israel) ISR	Oded Chekol
33	DF	(Belarus) BLR	Denis Polyakov
44	DF	(Israel) ISR	Hatem Abd Elhamed
55	MF	(Israel) ISR	Naor Sabag
81	GK	(Israel) ISR	Ahmed Awad
—	MF	(The Gambia) GAM	Sulayman Marreh

== Transfers ==
=== Summer ===
In:

No.	Pos.	Nation	Player
—	GK	(Israel) ISR	Yoav Gerafi (from F.C. Ashdod)
—	GK	(Israel) ISR	Niv Antman (from Sektzia Ness Ziona)
—	DF	(Israel) ISR	Inon Eliyahu (from Maccabi Haifa)
—	DF	(Israel) ISR	George Diba (from Hapoel Acre)
—	DF	(Israel) ISR	Nitay Bitan (from Maccabi Akhi Nazareth)
—	DF	(Republic of the Congo) CGO	Fernand Mayembo (from (France) Ajaccio)
—	DF	(Israel) ISR	Hatem Abd Elhamed (from Hapoel Be'er Sheva)
—	MF	(Israel) ISR	Naor Sabag (from F.C. Ashdod)
—	MF	(Israel) ISR	Itamar Noy (from (Austria) First Vienna)
—	MF	(Israel) ISR	Tomer Yosefi (from Hapoel Be'er Sheva, previously loaned)
—	MF	(Israel) ISR	Nitay Bitan (from Maccabi Jaffa)
—	MF	(Israel) ISR	Yasmao Cabeda (from Maccabi Jaffa)
—	MF	(The Gambia) GAM	Sulayman Marreh (from (Belgium) Gent)
—	MF	(Israel) ISR	Bar Lin (on loan from Maccabi Tel Aviv)
—	FW	(Israel) ISR	Guy Melamed (from Bnei Sakhnin)
—	FW	(Brazil) BRA	Felipe Santos (from (Azerbaijan) Gabala)
—	FW	(Israel) ISR	Oded Chekol (from Maccabi Haifa)

Out:

No.	Pos.	Nation	Player
—	GK	(Israel) ISR	Ohad Levita (to Hapoel Hadera)
—	DF	(Israel) ISR	Dudu Twito (to Ironi Kiryat Shmona)
—	DF	(Israel) ISR	Hatem Abd Elhamed (loan return to Hapoel Be'er Sheva)
—	DF	(Israel) ISR	Loai Taha (to Hapoel Acre)
—	DF	(Israel) ISR	Yarin Serdal (on loan to Hapoel Nof HaGalil)
—	DF	(Israel) ISR	Guy Mizrahi (loan return to Maccabi Tel Aviv)
—	DF	(Israel) ISR	Nitay Bitan (to Hapoel Acre)
—	MF	(Israel) ISR	Gal Arel (Retired)
—	MF	(Israel) ISR	Gidi Kanyuk (to Beitar Jerusalem)
—	MF	(Israel) ISR	Eliel Peretz (to (Cyprus) Apollon Limassol)
—	MF	(Israel) ISR	Tamir Glazer (to Hapoel Hadera, his player card still belongs to Maccabi Tel Aviv)
—	MF	(Israel) ISR	Snir Talias (to Ironi Tiberias, previously loaned)
—	MF	(Montenegro) MNE	Aleksandar Šćekić (to (Serbia) Partizan)
—	FW	(Israel) ISR	Alon Turgeman (to Hapoel Be'er Sheva)
—	FW	(Lithuania) LTU	Arvydas Novikovas (to (Lithuania) Žalgiris)
—	FW	(Haiti) HAI	Carnejy Antoine (to (Portugal) Torreense)
—	FW	(Israel) ISR	Jubayer Bushnak (on loan to Ihud Bnei Shefa-'Amr)

=== Winter ===
In:

No.	Pos.	Nation	Player

Out:

No.	Pos.	Nation	Player

== Pre-season and friendlies ==
Win Draw Loss

6 July 2023	Hapoel Acre	0–1	Hapoel Haifa	Acre
18:00		Report	Bitan 60'	Stadium: Acre Municipal Stadium

11 July 2023	Maccabi Petah Tikva	1–1	Hapoel Haifa	Petah Tikva
18:00	Levi 52'	Report	Santos 40'	Stadium: Mahne Yehuda Stadium

15 July 2023	Hapoel Umm al-Fahm	0–5	Hapoel Haifa	Umm al-Fahm
19:00		Report	Melamed 16', 45'; Yosefi 18' (pen.); Noy 60'; Buganim 90'	Stadium: HaShalom Stadium

20 July 2023 Training Camp	Hapoel Haifa (Israel)	3–0	(Latvia) Valmiera	Riga, Latvia
18:00	Yosefi 39'; 49' (o.g.); Melamed 60'	Report		Stadium: Baltic Sport Village

24 July 2023 Training Camp	Hapoel Haifa (Israel)	3–0	(Latvia) Riga	Riga, Latvia
18:00	Yosefi 13', 15'; 33' (o.g.); Tubul 90'	Report		Stadium: Baltic Sport Village

26 October 2023	Maccabi Petah Tikva	2–0	Hapoel Haifa	Petah Tikva
11:00	Liam Shahar; Hindy pen.'	Report		Stadium: HaMoshava

2 November 2023	Hapoel Haifa	7–0	F.C. Kiryat Yam	Haifa
10:00	Melamed; Yosefi pen.' Noy; Semian; Tubul	Report		Stadium: Beit Nagler

7 November 2023	Hapoel Haifa	3–0	Ironi Tiberias	Haifa
10:00	Melamed 5'; Yosefi 55' (pen.); Gozlan 70'	Report		Stadium: Beit Nagler

10 November 2023	Hapoel Petah Tikva	2–3	Hapoel Haifa	Petah Tikva
10:00	Nawi 42'; Goshe 69'	Report	Melamed 11'; Buganim 61'; Gozlan 85'	Stadium: HaMoshava

17 November 2023	Hapoel Haifa	2–1	Bnei Sakhnin	Haifa
10:00	Melamed 70'; Gozlan 75'	Report	Hugi 3'	Stadium: Beit Nagler

24 November 2023	Hapoel Haifa	2–1	Maccabi Bnei Reineh	Haifa
10:00	Melamed 3', 45'	Report	Usman 90'	Stadium: Beit Nagler

== Competitions ==
=== Overview ===
Competition	First match	Last match	Starting round	Final position	Record							
Competition	First match	Last match	Starting round	Final position	Pld	W	D	L	GF	GA	GD	Win %
Ligat Ha'Al	28 August 2023	N/A	Matchday 1	N/A	6	4	1	1	10	6	+4	66.67
State Cup	N/A	N/A	Eighth Round	N/A	0	0	0	0	0	0	+0	—
Toto Cup	29 July 2023	19 December 2023	Group stage	9th	5	1	2	2	4	5	−1	20.00
Total					11	5	3	3	14	11	+3	45.45

Last updated: 14 July 2020.
Source: Competitions

== Ligat Ha'Al ==
=== Regular season ===
Pos	Team	Pld	W	D	L	GF	GA	GD	Pts	Qualification
2	Maccabi Haifa	26	17	6	3	55	18	+37	55 (Note: Maccabi Haifa had 2 points deducted.)	Qualification for the Championship round
3	Hapoel Be'er Sheva	26	15	4	7	45	19	+26	49	Qualification for the Championship round
4	Hapoel Haifa	26	14	5	7	38	32	+6	47	Qualification for the Championship round
5	Maccabi Bnei Reineh	26	8	10	8	27	26	+1	34	Qualification for the Championship round
6	Bnei Sakhnin	26	7	13	6	26	31	−5	33 (Note: Bnei Sakhnin had 1 point deducted.)	Qualification for the Championship round

Source: Soccerway
Rules for classification: 1) Points; 2) Goal difference; 3) Matches won; 4) Goals scored; 5) Head-to-head points; 6) Head-to-head goal difference; 7) Head-to-head goals scored; 8) Play-off.

==== Results summary ====
Overall								Home						Away					
Pld	W	D	L	GF	GA	GD	Pts	W	D	L	GF	GA	GD	W	D	L	GF	GA	GD
6	4	1	1	10	6	+4	13	1	1	1	5	4	+1	3	0	0	5	2	+3

Last updated: 7 March 2022.

==== Results by matchday ====
Away
Home
Win
Draw
Loss
Qualification for the Championship round & 1st place
Qualification for the Championship round & 2nd place
Qualification for the Championship round & 3rd place
Qualification for the Championship round
Transfer to the Relegation round

Matchday	1	2	3	4	5	6	7	8	9	10	11	12	13	14	15	16	17	18	19	20	21	22	23	24	25	26	27	28	29	30	31	32	33
Ground	A	H	H	A	H	A	H	A	H	A	H	A	H	H	A	A	H	A	H	A	H	A	H	A	H	A							
Result	W	D	W	W	L	W																											
Position	3	5	2	2	2	2																											

Updated to match(es) played on 7 March 2022. Source:

==== Matches ====
Win Draw Loss

==== Results overview ====
Win Draw Loss

Opposition	Home score	Away score
Beitar Jerusalem		2–1
Bnei Sakhnin		
F.C. Ashdod	2–0	
Hapoel Be'er Sheva		
Hapoel Hadera		2–1
Hapoel Jerusalem		
Hapoel Petah Tikva		
Hapoel Tel Aviv		
Maccabi Bnei Reineh		
Maccabi Haifa		
Maccabi Netanya		
Maccabi Petah Tikva	2–2	
Maccabi Tel Aviv		

== State Cup ==
=== Round of 32 ===
Round of 32	v

== Toto Cup ==
=== Group stage ===
Pos	Team	Pld	W	D	L	GF	GA	GD	Pts	Qualification	BnS	MNE	HHA	HHD	MBR
1	Bnei Sakhnin	4	3	0	1	5	5	0	9	Semi-finals		0–3		2–1	
2	Maccabi Netanya	4	2	1	1	7	3	+4	7	5–8th classification play-offs			1–2	3–1	
3	Hapoel Haifa	4	1	1	2	4	5	−1	4	9–10th classification play-offs	0–1				1–1
4	Hapoel Hadera	4	1	1	2	5	7	−2	4	11–12th classification play-offs			2–1		1–1
5	Maccabi Bnei Reineh	4	0	3	1	3	4	−1	3	13–14th classification play-offs	1–2	0–0			

Source: Israel Football Association, One.co.il
Rules for classification: 1) points; 2) goal difference; 3) number of wins; 4) goals scored; 5) head to head; 6) higher position in the last season.
