= Robbie Keane =

Irish footballer and manager (born 1980)

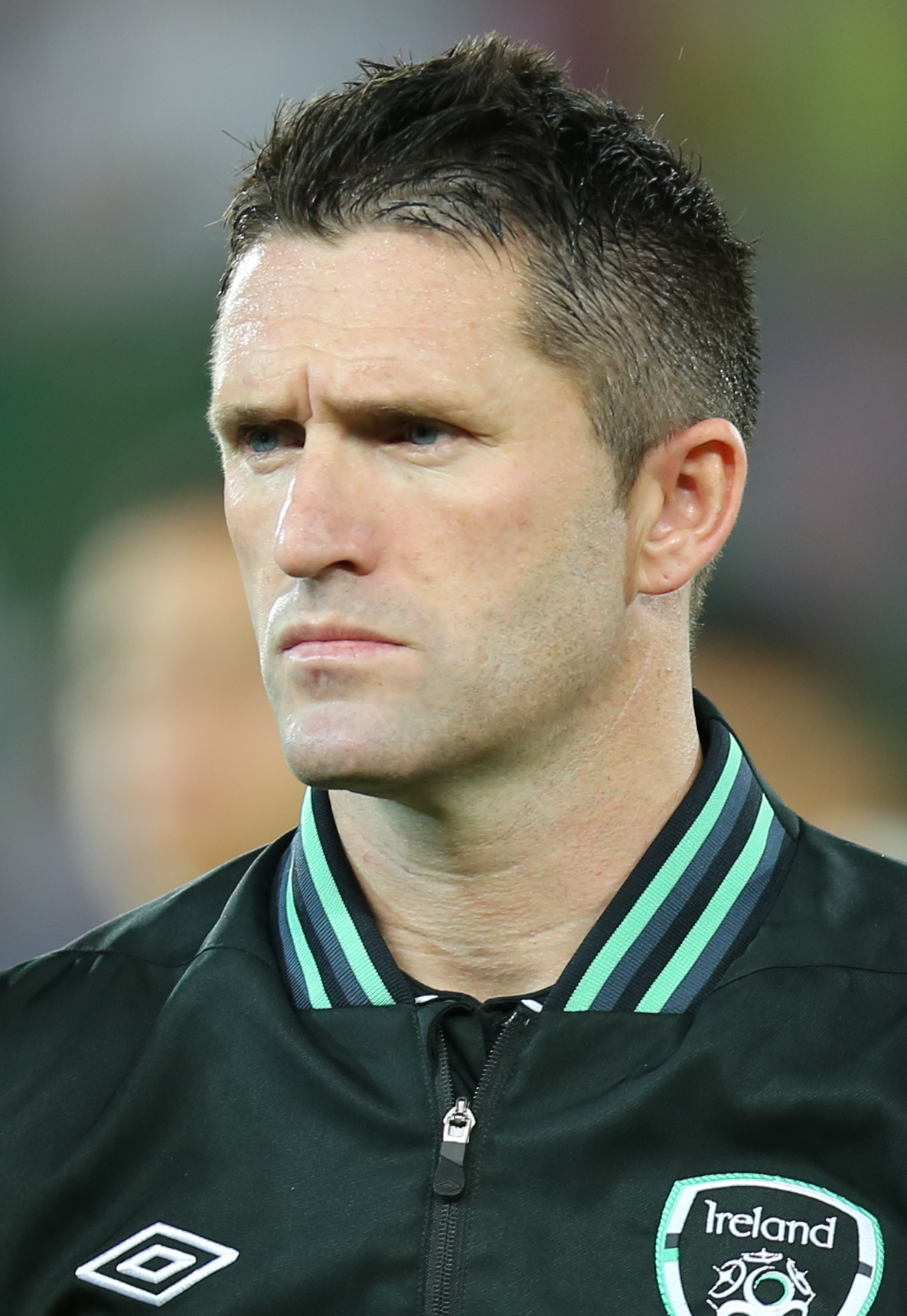
- Keane with the Republic of Ireland in 2013

Personal information
- Full name: Robert David Keane
- Date of birth: 8 July 1980 (age 46)
- Place of birth: Tallaght, County Dublin, Ireland
- Height: 1.76 m (5 ft 9 in)
- Position: Striker

Youth career
- 1986–1990: Fettercairn YFC
- 1990–1996: Crumlin United
- 1996–1997: Wolverhampton Wanderers

Senior career*
Years	Team	Apps	(Gls)
1997–1999	Wolverhampton Wanderers	73	(24)
1999–2000	Coventry City	31	(12)
2000–2001	Inter Milan	6	(1)
2000–2001	→ Leeds United (loan)	18	(9)
2001–2002	Leeds United	28	(4)
2002–2008	Tottenham Hotspur	197	(80)
2008–2009	Liverpool	19	(5)
2009–2011	Tottenham Hotspur	41	(11)
2010	→ Celtic (loan)	16	(12)
2011	→ West Ham United (loan)	9	(2)
2011–2016	LA Galaxy	125	(83)
2012	→ Aston Villa (loan)	6	(3)
2017–2018	ATK	9	(6)
Total		578	(251)

International career
1996	Republic of Ireland U16	3	(1)
1998	Republic of Ireland U18	4	(3)
1999	Republic of Ireland U20	4	(0)
1998–2016	Republic of Ireland	146	(68)

Managerial career
- 2018: ATK
- 2023–2024: Maccabi Tel Aviv
- 2025–2026: Ferencváros
Medal record
Representing Republic of Ireland
Men's football
UEFA European Under-19 Championship
Winner	1998 Cyprus
- * Club domestic league appearances and goals

Robert David Keane (born 8 July 1980) is an Irish professional football coach and former player, who was most recently the head coach of NB I club Ferencváros. Widely considered one of Ireland's greatest ever footballers, Keane played as a striker, and was captain of the Republic of Ireland from March 2006 until his international retirement in August 2016. He is the most capped player and top goalscorer for Ireland.

Keane began his career at Wolverhampton Wanderers, scoring twice on his first-team debut aged 17. The following season, he was the club's leading goalscorer and scored his first international goal for Ireland. He changed club frequently between 1999 and 2002, breaking transfer fee records, but his brief spells at Inter Milan and Leeds United were unexceptional. He joined Tottenham Hotspur in 2002 and played there for seven and a half years over two spells, amassing 306 appearances and 122 goals across all competitions. The 2007–08 season was the most fruitful of his career as he set a career record of 23 goals in a season, including a landmark 100th competitive goal, and won his first senior honour (the League Cup).

Keane moved to Liverpool in July 2008 but he spent only six months at the club before returning to Tottenham, where he was made first team captain. In January 2010, he moved on loan to Scottish Premier League side Celtic for the rest of the season, and spent the second half of the following season loaned to West Ham United. He left Tottenham for LA Galaxy in 2011, and in January 2012 went to Aston Villa on a two-month loan during the Major League Soccer (MLS) off-season. He departed LA Galaxy in 2016 having scored 104 goals across six seasons, before a short stint with Indian club ATK. Keane announced his retirement from professional football in November 2018. In total, he scored 126 Premier League goals for six clubs, which ranks him as the 17th-most successful goalscorer in the history of the Premier League.

Over an 18-year international career, Keane won 146 caps and scored 68 goals for the Republic of Ireland, both a national record. Keane is the joint seventh-highest European international goalscorer of all time. At the time of his retirement, he was the only player in football history to have scored at least one international goal in 19 consecutive years. Keane was the Republic of Ireland's top scorer at the 2002 FIFA World Cup with three goals as they reached the last 16, and also played at UEFA Euro 2012 and UEFA Euro 2016. Throughout his club and international career he was known for his goal celebration where he performed a cartwheel followed by a forward roll.

After announcing his retirement from playing, Keane began his coaching career with the Ireland senior team as assistant manager under Mick McCarthy's management setup in November 2018. He also took on the role of assistant manager at Championship club Middlesbrough in 2019, with his former teammate Jonathan Woodgate as manager. He left both roles in 2020. He became the head coach of Maccabi Tel Aviv in June 2023, winning the Israeli Premier League and Toto Cup in his only season. He became the manager of Ferencváros in January 2025 and won the Hungarian title at the end of the season.

== Early life ==
Robert David Keane was born and raised in Tallaght, County Dublin, the son of Anne and Robert Keane. He started his football career with local club Fettercairn before joining Dublin schoolboy team Crumlin United at the age of 10, where his talent was seen and recognised at an early age. He also played Gaelic football until he was 15, before giving it up to pursue a football career. Keane received offers from both Liverpool and Wolverhampton Wanderers, but decided to go to the First Division side, judging that it would be harder to break into the first team at Liverpool. He moved to Wolverhampton four days before his 16th birthday in July 1996, joining their youth team.

== Club career ==
=== Wolverhampton Wanderers ===
Keane progressed through Wolves' youth ranks and made his professional debut aged 17 on 9 August 1997, scoring twice against Norwich City. The following season he excelled at the club, earning praise from both the press and Wolves manager Colin Lee. He went on to be the club's leading scorer, with 16 goals in the 1998–99 season. Keane's performances and goalscoring record with both Wolves and his national team attracted much interest from larger clubs and a move for the young striker seemed imminent given Wolves' finances. However, with three years left on his contract, Wolves sought a high price for their Irish star and managing director John Richards stated his reluctance to sell Keane unless their asking price was met.

=== Coventry City ===
Just weeks into the 1999–2000 season, he was sold to Premier League club Coventry City for £6 million, then a British record for a teenager. Keane got off to a great start, scoring two goals on his debut against Derby County. During a successful season at Coventry, he played a major role in a stylish attacking side boasting the likes of Gary McAllister, Mustapha Hadji and Youssef Chippo and formed a productive strike partnership with Cédric Roussel. Keane played in a total of 34 games, scoring 12 goals, all of which came in the Premier League.

=== Inter Milan ===
After an impressive first season in the Premier League, Keane was signed by Italian Serie A club Inter Milan for a fee of £13 million in July 2000, signing a five-year contract. However, Keane's dream move to Italy soon soured when manager Marcello Lippi was sacked. Lippi's successor, Marco Tardelli, deemed Keane to be surplus to requirements and in December 2000, he was loaned out to Leeds United. Keane made 14 appearances for Inter in all competitions scoring three goals, his most memorable coming two minutes into the Supercoppa Italiana match against Lazio. He also scored against Ruch Chorzów in the UEFA Cup and Lecce in the Coppa Italia.

=== Leeds United ===
His Leeds career got off to an impressive start, scoring nine goals in 14 starts for the club before the Leeds manager, David O'Leary, made his loan deal permanent in May 2001 at an original cost of £12 million. The following season was not so bright, and he found himself dropping down the pecking order. His form suffered and he managed only nine goals in 33 appearances, three of them in a 6–0 League Cup win at Leicester City on 9 October 2001.

Meanwhile, Leeds sunk deeper into debt and were forced to sell many players, with Keane joining the exodus when he was sold to Tottenham Hotspur just before the 2002–03 transfer deadline for a fee of £7 million.

=== Tottenham Hotspur ===
==== 2002–2005 ====
He's such a bubbly lad that anyone who meets him loves him.

— Glenn Hoddle on Keane's personality.

On signing him for Tottenham, manager Glenn Hoddle said that Keane was ideally suited to Tottenham and could make White Hart Lane his "spiritual home" for years to come. Keane had an impressive debut at Spurs, winning a penalty during a 3–2 win over West Ham United. Keane's first goal for Tottenham came in a 2–1 win against Blackburn Rovers at Ewood Park. Although Spurs finished in a disappointing tenth place, Keane was their success story of the season, finishing as Tottenham's top scorer with 13 goals, including a spectacular hat-trick in a win over Everton at White Hart Lane.

In the 2003–04 season, Spurs battled with relegation, but Keane's goals played a major part in helping secure Tottenham's Premier League status. A hat-trick against Wolves, and a last-minute penalty to equalise in the North London derby against Arsenal, despite Arsenal winning the Premier League at Tottenham, were highlights as Keane once again ended the season as Tottenham's top scorer with 16 goals, 14 in the league.

His third season, 2004–05, was more frustrating. Despite finishing with his highest return of goals in a season for Spurs, 17, he played second-fiddle to the likes of Jermain Defoe, Frédéric Kanouté and Mido for much of the season. The frustration culminated in Keane storming from the dugout towards the end of a game against Birmingham City in April 2005 after all the substitutes had been used, meaning he would not get a chance to appear. He was fined £10,000 and forced to train with the reserves after the outburst and his future at the club was thrown into doubt.

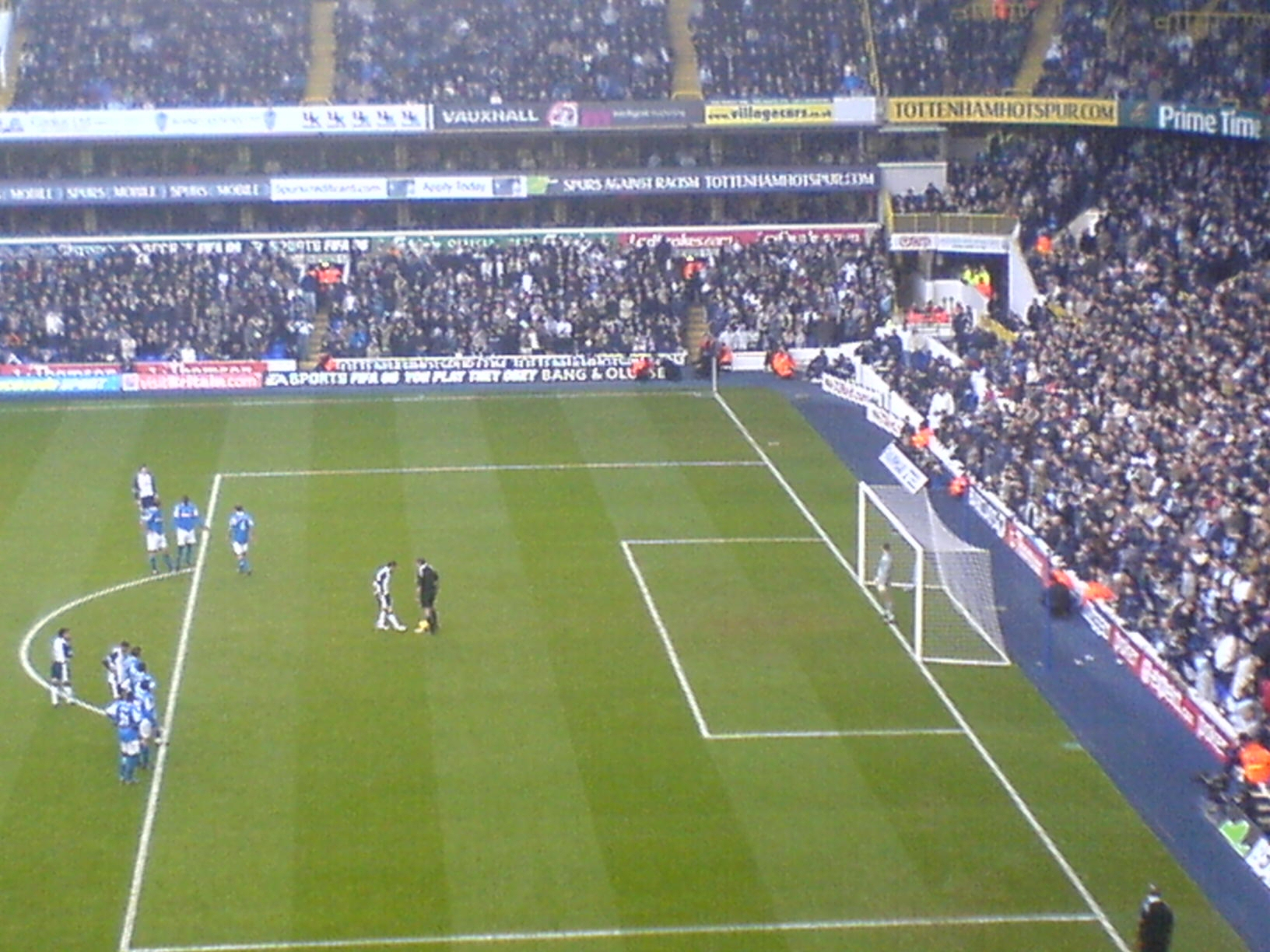
Keane stepping up to take a penalty against Birmingham City at White Hart Lane in December 2005

The 2005–06 season started as the previous one had ended, with Defoe being preferred to partner Mido in Tottenham's strikeforce. However, Defoe's strike-rate continued to disappoint and Keane's persistence paid off in November when manager Martin Jol eventually gave Keane a chance to replace Defoe and stake his claim. By March, he had overtaken Mido as the top goalscorer at the club. Keane went on to finish the season with 16 league goals — making him the Premier League's joint fourth-highest goalscorer that season. He had also been made the vice-captain, taking the captaincy on occasions when Ledley King was not available. Keane was involved in a training ground fight with teammate Edgar Davids in December 2005, but the pair subsequently made up publicly and were seen encouraging each other on the pitch.

==== 2006–2008 ====
In February 2006, Inter's owner and president, Massimo Moratti, admitted his regret at letting Keane go after being impressed by his performances at Tottenham. Keane extended his commitment to Tottenham, signing a new four-year contract in March 2006. Keane was named as one of ten Spurs squad members to be struck down by norovirus on 6 May 2006. However, he still managed to play in their final game of the season against West Ham United.

Keane had a slow start to the 2006–07 season which was further set back by a knee ligament injury that Keane suffered against Middlesbrough on 5 December 2006. His coming back from injury marked the beginning of a return to form and a dynamic partnership with Dimitar Berbatov. Keane and Berbatov were jointly awarded the Premier League's Player of the Month Award for April 2007. Keane finished the season with a total of 22 goals in all competitions — the highest-ever season tally of his career — scoring 15 goals in his last 15 appearances of the season.

Keane made his 200th appearance for Tottenham in the final game of the 2006–07 season against Manchester City scoring the first goal in a 2–1 victory that saw Tottenham secure fifth place in the league.

He signed a new five-year contract with Tottenham on 28 May 2007. On 26 December 2007, he became the thirteenth player in the history of the league to score 100 Premier League goals. 2007 proved to be a remarkable year for the striker with a total of 31 goals and 13 assists from just 40 starts. His tally of 19 league goals in the calendar year was the highest of any player in the Premier League throughout 2007.

He scored his 100th competitive goal for Tottenham in the 2–0 win against Sunderland on 19 January 2008, becoming the fifteenth Tottenham player to achieve this feat. On 24 February 2008, he won his first senior honour as a player as his Tottenham side won the first League Cup Final to be played at the new Wembley Stadium, beating Chelsea 2–1 after extra time. On 12 April 2008, Keane made his 250th appearance for Spurs in the 1–1 draw with Middlesbrough. Keane finished the 2007–08 season equal top scorer for Spurs with Berbatov, with 23 goals in all competitions. His 15 Premier League goals making him the first Spurs player to score double figures in the Premier League in 6 consecutive seasons. Keane won Player of the Year three times during his Tottenham career (2003, 2005–06 and 2007–08); the first player to do so.

His consistency and strike-rate attracted the attention of Premier League rivals Liverpool. Despite initial resistance to the sale and accusations of misconduct, Tottenham agreed to a £20.3 million deal for the player.

=== Liverpool ===
Liverpool publicly announced their interest in Keane on 1 July 2008. Amid accusations that Liverpool had unsettled the player, Tottenham Hotspur filed a complaint to the Premier League regarding the club's conduct. However, on 28 July 2008, Tottenham confirmed the sale of Keane for £19 million (plus a potential £1.3 million in performance based compensation). Keane agreed terms with Liverpool shortly afterwards, signing a four-year contract with the Merseyside club. Upon his arrival to Liverpool, Keane said, "I've been a Liverpool fan all my life, going back to when I was a kid growing up in Dublin, and I always had a Liverpool shirt on my back. So, to be here now as a Liverpool player is incredible and I couldn't be happier." Following the transfer, Tottenham withdrew their official complaint against Liverpool after the club made a donation to the Tottenham Hotspur Foundation and apologised for their behaviour prior to the deal. Tottenham chairman Daniel Levy publicly stated his dissatisfaction, saying he had been forced into transferring the player due to Liverpool's interference.

Keane was given the squad number 7, and scored his first goal for Liverpool on 1 October 2008 in a Champions League win against PSV Eindhoven at Anfield. A second Champions League goal quickly followed with Keane scoring the opening goal in Liverpool's 1–1 draw with Atlético Madrid. Premier League goals were less forthcoming but he scored twice for Liverpool against West Bromwich Albion on 8 November.

Six weeks passed before Keane scored again but it was a crucial equaliser against Arsenal, giving Liverpool a 1–1 away draw against their league rivals. In the following Premier League match against Bolton, Keane scored two more league goals to seal a 3–0 win for Liverpool. Despite this he failed to establish himself as a first team regular and when he did play was often played out of position. During the January transfer window, Tottenham Hotspur made an approach for the striker and Liverpool accepted the offer, allowing the Irishman to return to his former club for a fee of £12 million, £7 million less than Liverpool had paid for him.

=== Return to Tottenham Hotspur ===
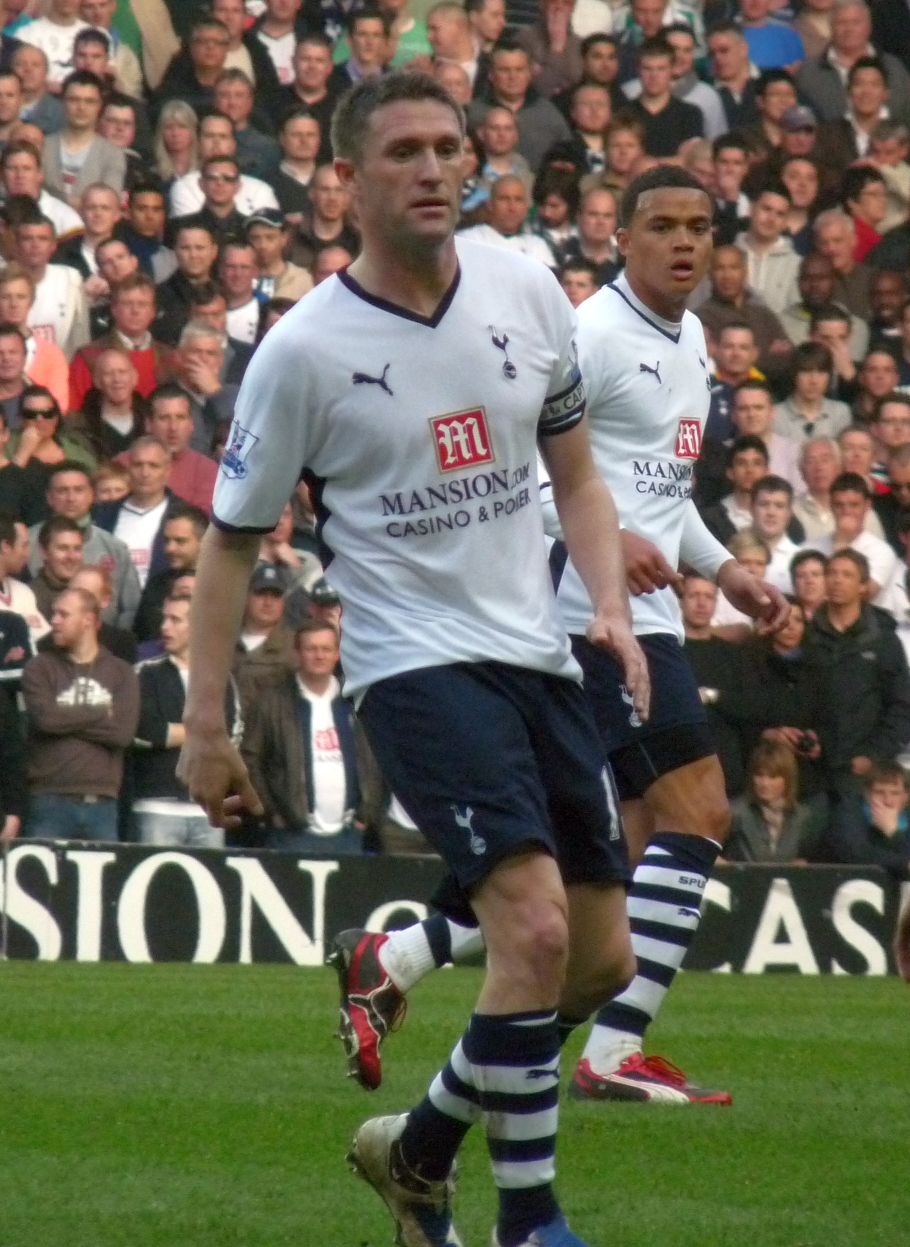
Keane playing against Chelsea on 21 March 2009 at White Hart Lane

Keane rejoined Tottenham on 2 February 2009, signing for a basic fee of £12 million, potentially rising to £16 million with add-ons. The deal meant that the cumulative transfer fees paid for Keane over his career amounted to around £75 million. He signed a four-year contract with the north London club. Keane was one of three players to make returns to Tottenham during the transfer window, along with Jermain Defoe and Pascal Chimbonda. He was also made Tottenham vice-captain a week later, after often deputising for Ledley King during his first spell there. He was cup-tied for Spurs' appearance in the 2009 Football League Cup Final. Keane scored his first goal since his return to the club on 4 March, opening the scoring in the crucial 4–0 home victory against Middlesbrough. He followed this up by scoring another vital goal, this time a last-minute equaliser, away to Sunderland in a 1–1 draw on 7 March.

Soon after Keane's return to White Hart Lane, railway service Virgin Trains ran an advertisement with the slogan "A Liverpool to London return faster than Robbie Keane." On his return to Liverpool on the final day of the season, he scored in a 3–1 defeat. He received a generally warm reception from the fans despite scoring against them.

On 31 July 2009, Keane captained Tottenham to winning the Premier League Asia Trophy in a pre-season competition in China. He scored twice in the 3–0 win over Hull City inside Beijing Workers Stadium. On 26 September 2009, Keane scored four goals in a 5–0 win over Burnley. During Tottenham's League Cup Fourth round match, Keane scored one of two goals against Everton on 27 October 2009 at White Hart Lane. He continued his scoring form with another against Sunderland in their 2–0 home win on 7 November 2009.

==== Loan to Celtic ====
On 1 February 2010, Keane signed for Celtic in a loan deal until the end of the 2009–10 season and was assigned the number 7 shirt, previously worn by Jimmy Johnstone and Henrik Larsson. After signing for Celtic, Keane said: "The club is massive. I am a Celtic fan and did not have to ask much about it. I always wanted to play for Celtic and it works for all parties."

He made his Celtic debut in a 1–0 defeat on 2 February at Rugby Park against Kilmarnock. He scored his first goal for Celtic in a 4–2 victory in the fifth round of the Scottish Cup against Dunfermline at East End Park. He scored his first goal in the SPL against Aberdeen in a 4–4 draw on 13 February. His first goal at Celtic Park proved to be the winner against Dundee United on 20 February. Keane's first Old Firm match against Rangers was on 28 February, with Celtic losing 1–0. On 13 March, Keane scored his first Celtic hat-trick in a 3–0 Scottish Cup win over Kilmarnock, and then scored two in a league clash against them two weeks later.

Keane's penultimate match was a 2–1 Old Firm win over Rangers on 4 May. His last match for Celtic came against Hearts on 9 May, he scored the first goal in a 2–1 victory. He stated that he enjoyed his time at Celtic and that it had given him back his 'hunger for football'. On 12 April, Keane was announced as SPL Player of the Month for March 2010. On 19 April 2010, Keane was announced as Celtic's Fans' Player of the Year.

==== Loan to West Ham United ====
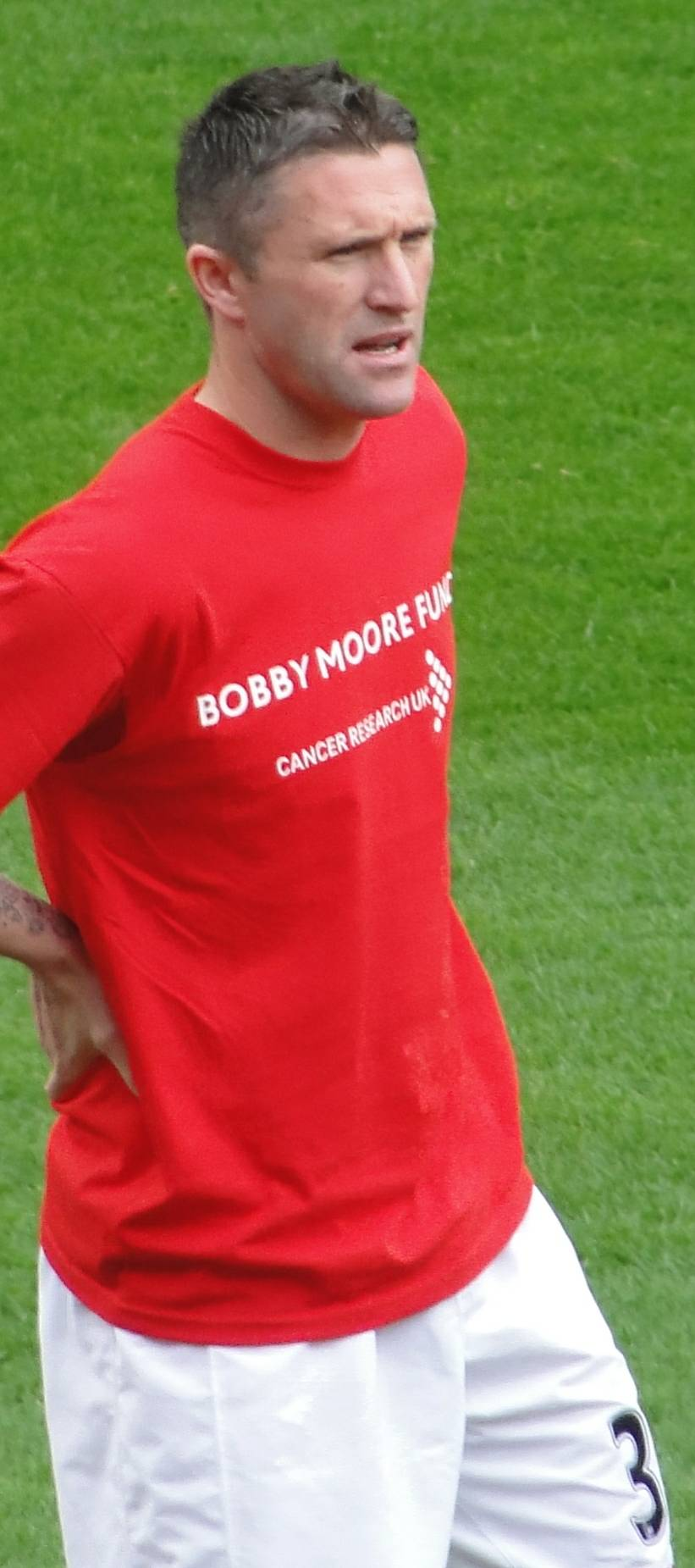
Keane warming up for West Ham United before a match against Aston Villa in April 2011

On 30 January 2011, Keane joined West Ham United on loan for the remainder of the season. Keane made his debut for West Ham on 2 February in a 3–1 victory over Blackpool at Bloomfield Road, scoring his first goal in the process. West Ham had an option to extend the deal by two years if they avoided relegation from the Premier League. However, in May 2011 West Ham were relegated and Keane returned to Tottenham.

=== LA Galaxy ===
==== 2011 ====
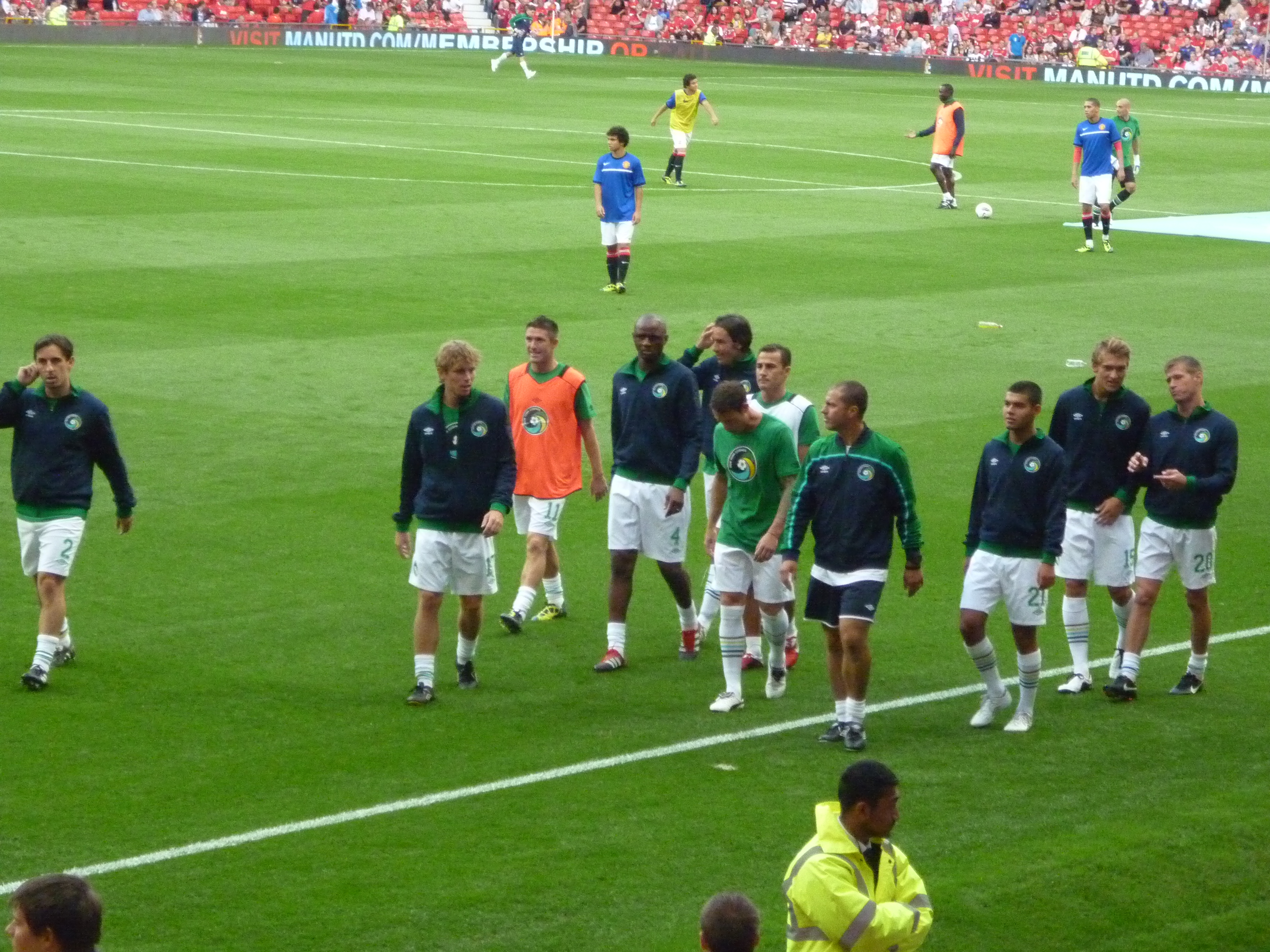
Keane in the New York Cosmos team

After playing for the newly reformed New York Cosmos in Paul Scholes's testimonial match, Keane joined LA Galaxy of MLS, becoming one of the club's three allowed designated players, alongside David Beckham and Landon Donovan. The Galaxy traded their previous third Designated Player, Juan Pablo Ángel, to city rivals Chivas USA to make room for Keane. He made his debut on 20 August 2011, in a California Clásico game against the San Jose Earthquakes, and scored his first goal for his new team in the 21st minute, in a 2–0 win at The Home Depot Center. On 13 September, he scored his first CONCACAF Champions League goal in a 2–1 group stage loss to Monarcas Morelia of Mexico.

The Galaxy finished the season as Western Conference champions, and won the Supporters' Shield. On 6 November, in his first full match, Keane scored in a 3–1 win over Real Salt Lake to book a place in the 2011 MLS Cup. Two weeks later, in their home stadium, he assisted Donovan's winning goal in the 72nd minute of the final, as the Galaxy defeated Houston Dynamo 1–0.

==== Loan to Aston Villa ====
On 8 January 2012, Keane agreed to move on loan to Aston Villa for two months, until the new MLS season began in March. He trained with the Villa squad on 9 and 10 January and completed the move on the 12th.

He made his debut at Villa Park in a 1–1 draw with Everton on 14 January, coming on as an 81st-minute substitute for Stephen Warnock. Keane then made his full debut in Villa's next match against Wolverhampton Wanderers, in which he scored his first two goals for the club including the winner in a 3–2 victory. On 5 February, he scored the equaliser against Newcastle United, in an eventual 2–1 loss, his third goal for Villa, in four league games.

==== Return from loan ====
On 18 March 2012, Keane scored twice in a 3–1 home win over D.C. United for the Galaxy's first win of the season. In July, with five goals including consecutive braces, he was voted MLS Player of the Month. He finished with 16 regular season goals, fourth in the league's top scorers, and was one of three strikers named in the MLS Best XI, alongside Thierry Henry and Chris Wondolowski. His two goals in a 4–2 win over Toronto on 22 September sealed a place in the 2012 MLS Cup playoffs. In the Conference Semifinals, Keane scored twice in a 3–1 second leg win over San Jose, as the Galaxy recovered from a 1–0 home loss in the first match. Against the Seattle Sounders in the Conference Final, he scored another two goals in a 3–0 first leg win, and a late penalty in a 2–1 loss in the second leg at CenturyLink Field. Keane scored a last-minute penalty to complete a 3–1 win in the 2012 MLS Cup, once again against Houston Dynamo.

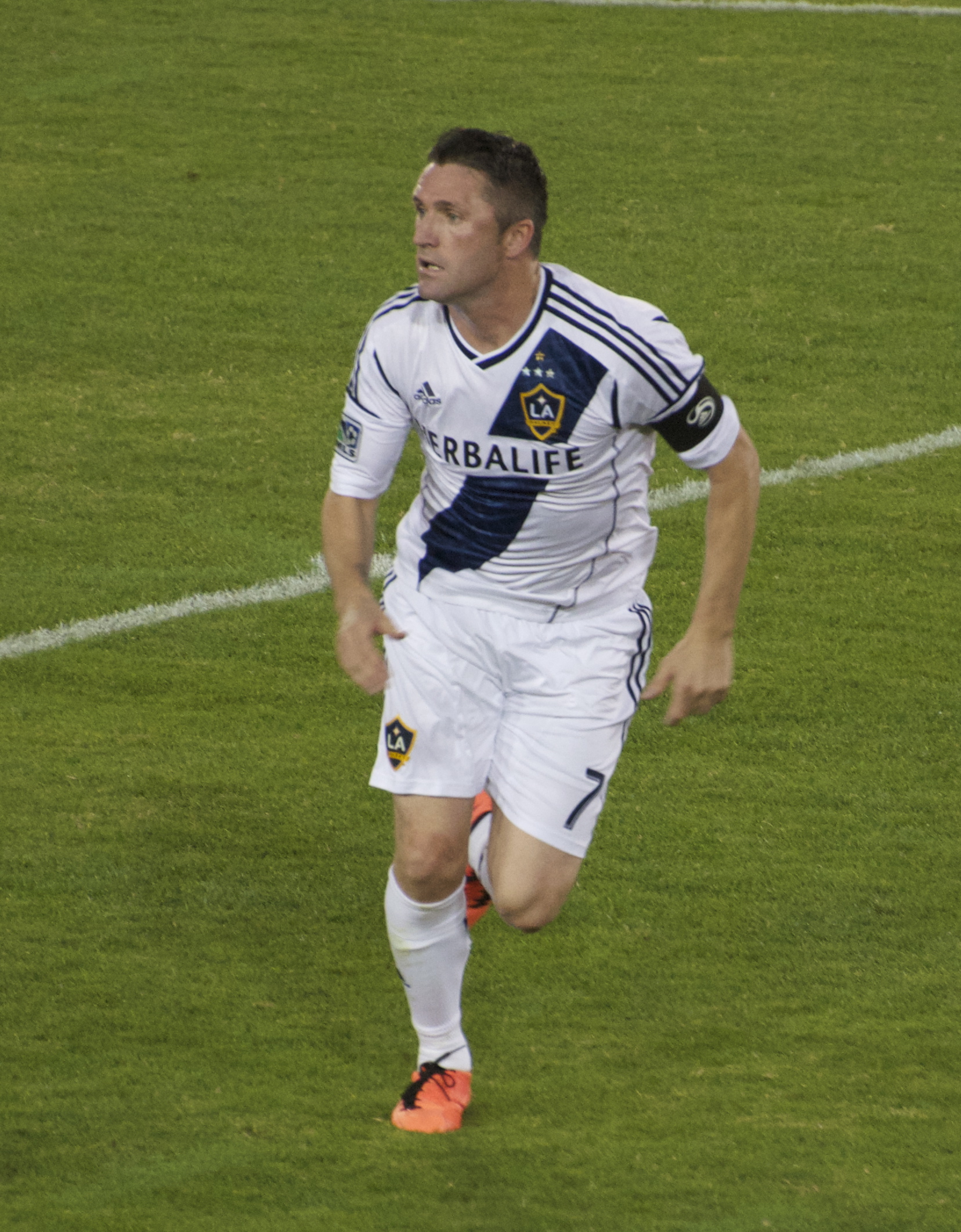
Keane in action for LA Galaxy in 2013

At the start of the 2013 season, in the absence of Donovan, Keane was promoted to captain by head coach Bruce Arena. On opening day, he had a part in each goal as Galaxy beat the Chicago Fire 4–0 at home, assisting a hat-trick for Mike Magee before himself finding the net in added time. On 26 May, he scored his first MLS hat-trick in a 4–0 rout of Seattle, and he recorded another on 27 August in a 4–2 comeback win over Salt Lake, putting him on 10 goals for the season; he was the league's Player of the Month in August. Keane scored twice in a 5–0 win over Chivas on 6 October, the first and last goals of the victory. For the second consecutive season, he made the MLS Best XI, as recognition for his 16 goals and 11 assists, statistics which put him fourth and third on the respective top scorer lists.

On 6 March 2014, Keane signed a new multi-year contract extension with LA Galaxy. For the third season in a row he reached double figures in goals, scoring his tenth on 20 July in a 2–1 loss at Sporting KC. Keane scored his 50th MLS regular-season goal on 28 September, chipping New York Red Bulls goalkeeper Luis Robles to open a 4–0 victory.

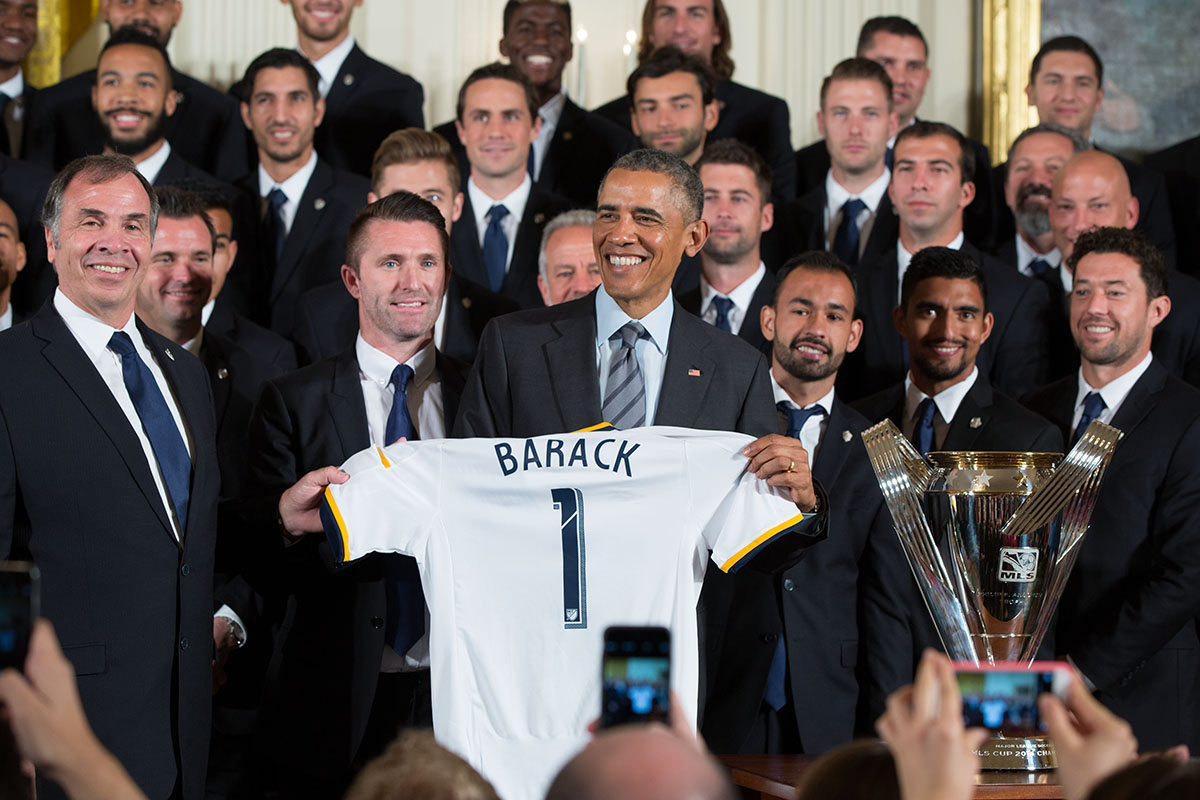
Keane and his 2014 MLS Cup-winning teammates meeting President Barack Obama in the White House

On 3 December 2014, Keane was awarded the MLS Most Valuable Player Award after a season in which he recorded a career high 19 goals and 14 assists in 29 appearances. Four days later, he scored the 111th-minute winner in the 2014 MLS Cup which the Galaxy won 2–1 against the New England Revolution for a record fifth title. Keane was given the MLS Cup MVP award, similar to the Man Of The Match award.

After the announcement that his former Liverpool teammate Steven Gerrard would join the Galaxy in July 2015, Keane confirmed that he would not hand over the captaincy. He scored the second goal of the 2–0 home win over Chicago in their first game of the season on 7 March. On 17 June, Keane scored a hat-trick in the fourth round of the U.S. Open Cup, as the Galaxy won 6–1 against fifth-tier amateurs PSA Elite. On 5 July, Keane scored a hat-trick in a 4–0 win over Toronto. Twelve days later, in Gerrard's first match, he scored three goals for the second consecutive game including two penalties with Gerrard also netting in a 5–2 win against San Jose.

On 6 March 2016, Keane scored from the penalty spot in the opening 2016 league fixture; a 4–1 home win against D.C. United. He followed that up with another successful penalty on 19 March in the 3–1 home victory against San Jose. After missing five games with a knee injury, Keane returned on 8 May to face New England Revolution and scored twice in the 4–2 home win. Keane scored his 80th MLS regular-season goal on 23 July in a 2–1 away win against Portland Timbers with a simple tap-in from close range. On 11 September, he scored Galaxy's fourth goal in their 4–2 home win over Orlando City. He scored twice in a 4–2 home defeat against Seattle Sounders on 25 September for his ninth and tenth goals of the season. In November, Keane stated that he would be leaving LA Galaxy after his contract expired at the end of the season, but that he would not be retiring. In total, he scored 104 goals in 165 appearances during his six seasons with the club with his last match being a playoff penalty shoot-out defeat to the Colorado Rapids on 6 November 2016.

=== ATK ===
On 4 August 2017, Keane signed for Indian Super League team ATK joining former teammate Teddy Sheringham, the team's head coach. He said that the opportunity to play in a new league appealed to him. He was assigned the number 10 jersey and appointed as the club captain. However, he suffered an achilles injury during a pre-season training camp in Dubai and had to return home for treatment, ruling him out of action until December. Spanish defender Jordi was appointed as the captain in his absence. On 7 December, he made his first-team debut, coming on as a 61st-minute substitute in a 3–2 defeat against Chennaiyin. On 23 December, he scored his first goal in a 1–0 victory against the Delhi Dynamos.

Keane was appointed player-manager of ATK in March 2018 after Sheringham and his replacement Ashley Westwood were sacked with ATK finishing outside the play-offs. He scored the only goal in a 1–0 win over NorthEast United on his managerial debut, enough to save them from last place. After contesting the final three matches as player-manager, Keane decided to leave the club at the end of the season and stated he would be taking time out to consider his options. He officially announced his retirement on 28 November 2018.

== International career ==
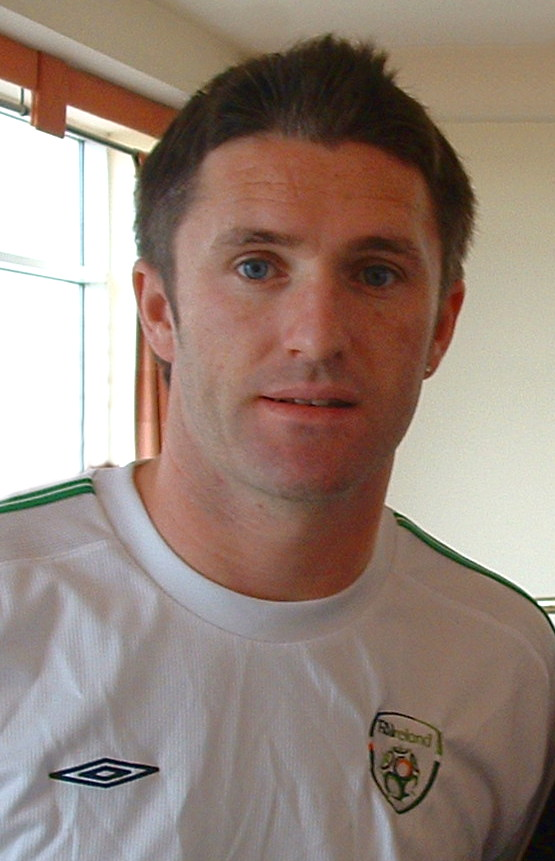
Keane with the Republic of Ireland national team in 2004

Keane was part of the so-called "golden generation" of Irish youth football of the late 1990s.

Under the guidance of Brian Kerr, the unfancied Republic of Ireland won the UEFA U16 and U18 European championships in 1998, and Keane was part of the victorious U18 side in Cyprus. In 1999, he played at the World Youth Cup in Nigeria, where the Republic of Ireland reached the last 16 before going out on penalties to the hosts. His first Republic of Ireland cap came against the Czech Republic in Olomouc in March 1998. He scored his first senior international goals against Malta in October that year.

Keane was selected by Mick McCarthy as part of the Republic of Ireland squad for the 2002 FIFA World Cup in South Korea and Japan, scoring three goals in the Republic of Ireland's four games. Keane scored an injury-time equaliser against Germany in the group stage match as the Irish surprised many by holding the former champions to a 1–1 draw. This was the first of only three goals which Germany conceded in the tournament (the other two were scored in the final by Brazil's Ronaldo). In the Round of 16 match against Spain, he scored a last-minute penalty to force the game into extra-time and a penalty shootout after the Irish had gone a goal down early in the first half, but eventually lost 3–2 on penalties.

Keane became the Republic of Ireland's leading goalscorer during a match against the Faroe Islands on 13 October 2004 when he scored his 22nd and 23rd goals. The first of these goals broke Niall Quinn's record of 21 goals.

Although the Republic of Ireland failed to qualify for the 2006 FIFA World Cup, Keane scored four goals in the Republic of Ireland's eight qualifying matches. Following Steve Staunton's appointment as Republic of Ireland manager, Keane was appointed captain. In their first game under Staunton, Keane scored the second goal in the 3–0 victory against Sweden at Lansdowne Road, and celebrated the final match at the Lansdowne Road stadium with a hat-trick on his 70th senior international appearance in a 5–0 defeat of San Marino on 15 November 2006. Giovanni Trapattoni, who took over from Staunton, maintained Keane as team captain starting in his first game in charge against Serbia on 24 May 2008 which ended in a 1–1 draw.

As captain, Keane led the team to a second-place finish in the 2010 World Cup qualifying campaign. He scored his 40th international goal against Cyprus, a header in the 83rd minute, which secured a 2–1 win for the Republic of Ireland. Along with Dimitar Berbatov, he topped the scoring chart in the qualifying group with 5 goals in 10 games. His 41st international goal came in the controversial 2010 World Cup play-off with France on 18 November 2009. This was his 26th goal in competitive (non-friendly) internationals.

Keane won his 100th cap against Argentina in a 1–0 friendly defeat on 11 August 2010. This match was also the first international football match at the new Aviva Stadium. He scored his 45th international goal against Russia in October 2010. It was the first time the Republic of Ireland had lost a game in which Keane had scored. Previously, the Republic of Ireland had won 26 and drew 10 of the 36 games in which Keane had scored. He equalled Andy Townsend's record for most appearances as Republic of Ireland captain (40) on 26 March 2011 and also scored a goal in the process.

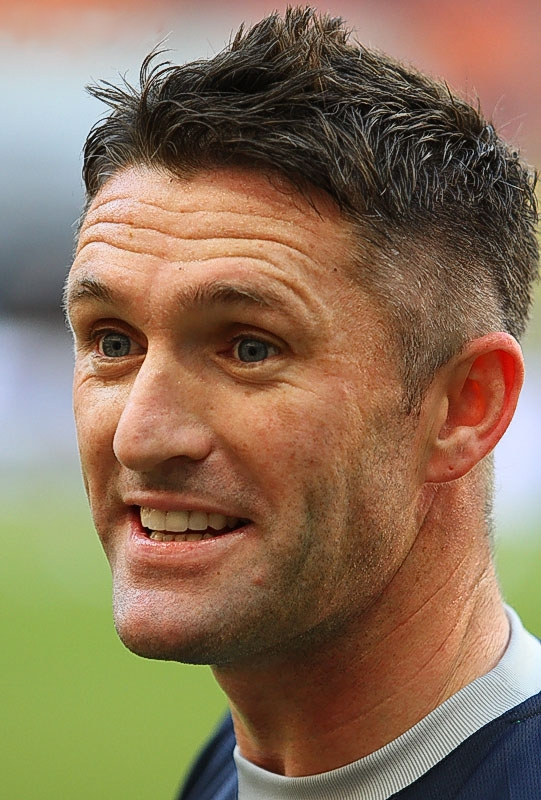
Keane with the Republic of Ireland in 2011 before a match against Russia

Keane took part in the inaugural Nations Cup for the Republic of Ireland, which took place in February and May 2011. He ended the tournament as top scorer, despite not having played in their first game against Wales. Keane scored three goals in total, two against Northern Ireland in a 5–0 victory, and what proved to be the tournament's winning goal in a 1–0 victory over Scotland. The Republic of Ireland emerged from the competition victorious, having won all three of their games without conceding a goal.

On 4 June 2011, Keane scored twice in a 2–0 away win against Macedonia in qualification for UEFA Euro 2012 to become the first Irish or British player to score more than 50 international goals. Following the game with Macedonia his total stood at 51 goals. He added another two goals in the Republic of Ireland's 4–0 play-off hammering of Estonia in Tallinn which effectively secured qualification for Euro 2012 in Poland and Ukraine to bring his goal tally to 53.

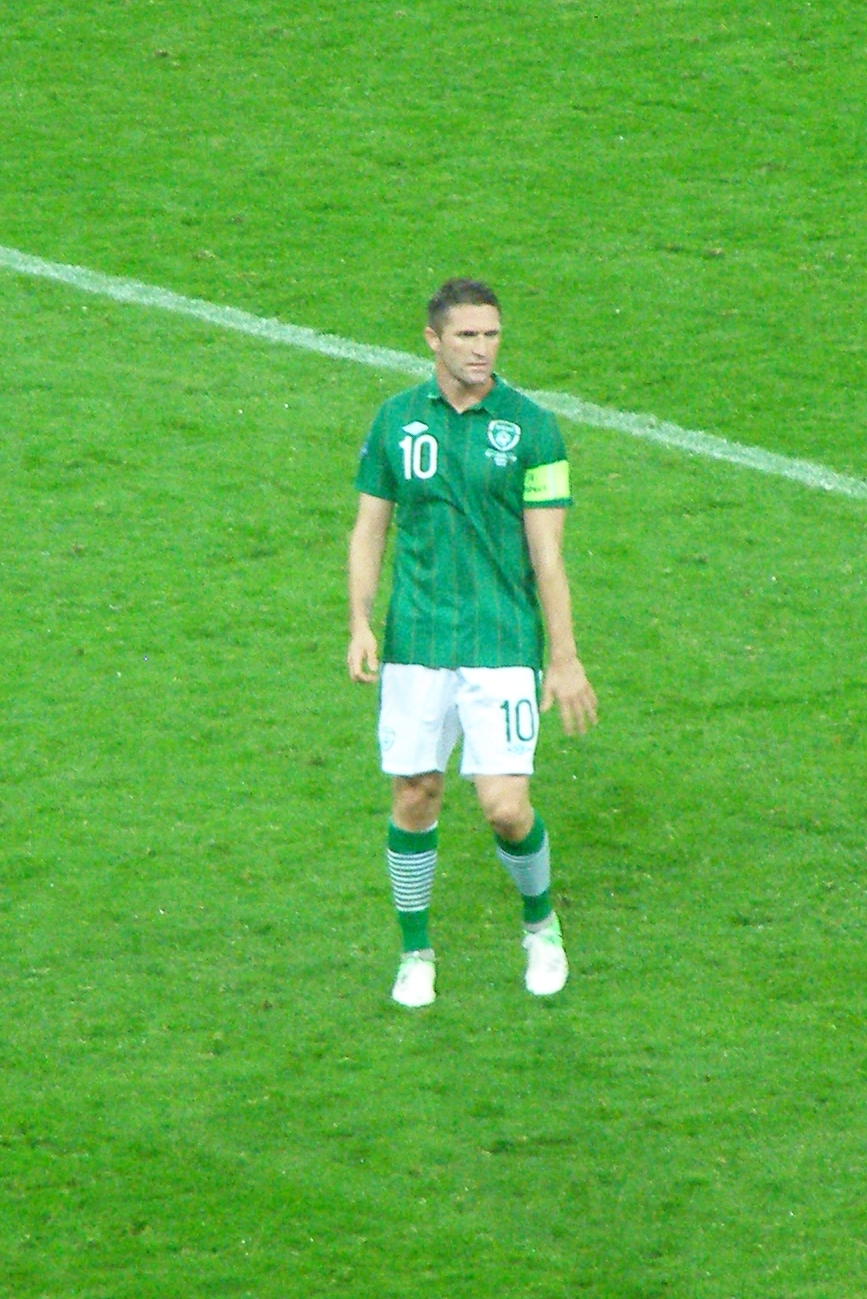
Keane during a match against Spain at Euro 2012

After a disappointing tournament in Poland, Keane brought his international tally to 54, with an 89th-minute penalty against Kazakhstan in the Republic of Ireland's opening World Cup 2014 qualification match. This left the score at 1–1 before Kevin Doyle's goal a minute later secured a winning start to the campaign. On 2 June 2013, Keane scored the third and fourth goals of the game, his 55th and 56th goals for the Republic of Ireland, against Georgia in a 4–0 win.

On 7 June 2013, Keane played his 126th game for the Republic of Ireland and became the new record appearance holder, breaking Shay Given's previous record of 125 appearances. He also scored his second hat-trick of his international career in the same game against the Faroe Islands scoring his 57th, 58th and 59th goals in a 3–0 win for the Republic of Ireland. Keane scored his 60th international goal against Sweden on 6 September 2013, in a 2–1 loss. He went on to score his 61st and 62nd goals for the Republic of Ireland against Kazakhstan on 15 October 2013 in a 3–1 win and against Latvia a month later in a 3–0 victory, both games being played in Dublin.

Keane missed his chance to score his 63rd goal against Costa Rica in Philadelphia on 6 June 2014 when he missed a penalty in a friendly game. He was the highest male international scorer among active players following Miroslav Klose's retirement in 2014. On 11 October 2014, he scored his third international hat-trick, his 63rd, 64th and 65th goals, in a 7–0 European qualifying win against Gibraltar at Aviva Stadium. The treble concluded with a penalty in the 18th minute. This took him to a record 21 goals in European Championship qualifiers, surpassing the 20 by Turkey's Hakan Şükür. He would later extend his tally to 23 goals, although the record was broken by Portugal's Cristiano Ronaldo on 10 September 2019.

Keane was selected in manager Martin O'Neill's 23-man squad for UEFA Euro 2016 in what would be his final major tournament appearance for the Republic of Ireland. However, he was restricted to a bench role and only played a total of 23 minutes against Sweden and Belgium respectively.

On 24 August 2016, Keane announced his retirement from international football. His last match for the Republic of Ireland was a friendly against Oman on 31 August 2016 at Aviva Stadium. The Republic of Ireland emerged victorious 4–0 and Keane signed off with a goal to take him level with German great Gerd Müller on 68 international goals. He received a rousing ovation from the assembled crowd when he was substituted in the 57th minute. Keane was also given a guard of honour from his Republic of Ireland teammates after the match had finished and he left the pitch with his two sons to rapturous applause from the home fans.

== Coaching career ==
=== Early career ===
In March 2018, Keane was appointed player-manager of ATK after Sheringham and his replacement Ashley Westwood were sacked, with ATK finishing outside the play-offs. He scored the only goal in a 1–0 win over NorthEast United on his managerial debut, enough to save them from last place. After contesting the final three matches as player-manager, Keane decided to leave the club at the end of the season.

In November 2018, Keane agreed to act as the assistant manager of the Republic of Ireland national team, under the management of newly appointed Mick McCarthy.

In June 2019, he accepted the dual roles of assistant manager of Middlesbrough in the Championship and the Republic of Ireland national team. His former Leeds and Tottenham teammate Jonathan Woodgate, who had been appointed the manager of the Teesside-based club, offered him the role as part of a refurbished coaching team. On 23 June 2020, Keane left his role as Middlesbrough assistant manager after his one-year contract came to an end during the COVID-19 pandemic. Keane completed UEFA coaching qualifications, receiving the UEFA Pro Licence in 2020.

On 3 May 2023, Keane joined the coaching staff of Premier League side Leeds, following the appointment of Sam Allardyce as manager. However, in the aftermath of the club's relegation at the end of the season, both Allardyce and Keane left Leeds by mutual agreement on 2 June.

=== Maccabi Tel Aviv ===
On 26 June 2023, Keane was appointed new head coach of Israeli Premier League side Maccabi Tel Aviv, signing a two-year contract with the club and taking over his first managerial role. His former international teammate Rory Delap was named as his assistant. Keane's appointment was criticised by the international Boycott, Divestment and Sanctions movement, which urged him to join "the international athletes who fight for the rights of the Palestinians and oppose cooperating with apartheid", and by Sinn Féin TD Chris Andrews, who expressed disappointment that Keane had signed up with a "racist and apartheid Israeli club". At his first press conference in Tel Aviv, Keane responded to a question "I don't want to get into politics. This is the last time I will say it. I'm here as a football man and someone that loves the game. I will certainly just focus on that but thanks for your question". Leo Varadkar, the Taoiseach in charge of the Irish government at the time, defended Keane's right to work in Israel.

Keane started his spell as manager with four wins and a draw to put Maccabi Tel Aviv on top of the league table. He was evacuated to Greece following the October 7th massacre by Hamas. While domestic football was cancelled, Keane's team continued playing in the UEFA Europa Conference League, resuming with a 3–1 win away to another exiled team in Zorya Luhansk of Ukraine on 9 November, and continuing with their home games to Serbia. Keane led the club to victory in the 2024 Toto Cup on 24 January 2024.

Keane's team reached the last 16 of the Europa Conference League and took a 4–1 win in the first leg away to eventual winners Olympiacos, but lost 7–5 on aggregate after extra time. He won the league in his only season, taking an eight-point lead over Maccabi Haifa with two games to go. At the end of the season Keane decided to leave the club.

In November 2024, Keane's wife said that the family were still receiving threats from a small number of pro-Palestine activists, which had made her doubt their safety in Ireland. While he was targeted in Ireland for not leaving Israel during the war, he was also criticised within Israel for not endorsing the war.

=== Ferencváros ===
On 6 January 2025, Keane was hired as the next head coach of Ferencváros, replacing Pascal Jansen. He debuted with a 2–0 defeat from Eintracht Frankfurt at the Waldstadion in the 2024–25 UEFA Europa League league phase. Keane's home debut ended with a 4–3 victory over AZ. Finally, Ferencváros qualified for the knock-out stage. On 2 February 2025, his first league match ended with a goalless draw against MTK in the Örökrangadó. After a 2–2 draw against Zalaegerszegi at the ZTE Arena, Keane's Ferencváros suffered their first defeat in the Nemzeti Bajnokság I on 9 February 2025, when Ferencváros were defeated 1–0 by Puskás Akadémia at the Pancho Aréna. Puskás Akadémia also overtook Ferencváros on the table of the 2024–25 Nemzeti Bajnokság I season. On 9 March 2025, he secured his first victory in the Nemzeti Bajnokság I by beating Debrecen 1–0 at the Nagyerdei Stadion. On 6 April 2025, he managed Ferencváros for the first time during the Ferencváros-Újpest, also known as Budapest Derby, with a 2–0 victory over Ferencváros' arch-rival.

On 10 April 2025, his side set a record for home victory of the 2024–25 Nemzeti Bajnokság I season by defeating Nyíregyháza Spartacus 7–0 at the Ferencváros Stadion. After beating Rangers 2–1 at home in the 2025–26 UEFA Europa League season, Ferencváros secured their qualification for the knock-out phase. Keane said in an interview: "I love being involved in big nights like this. I had this as a player; I get that buzz. I love what I do; I love being a manager. It's the next best thing to playing. Tonight was special." On 17 December 2025, his contract with Ferencváros was renewed. The last match of 2025 was won by Ferencváros 1–0 against Diósgyőri at the Diósgyőri Stadion. On 26 February 2026 Ferencváros defeated PFC Ludogorets Razgrad 2–0 at home in the second leg of the UEFA Europa League playoff, advancing to the round of 16 with a 3–2 aggregate victory. This was the first time since 1975 that Ferencváros won an international match in the spring cup season. On 9 May 2026, he won the 2025–26 Magyar Kupa season with Ferencváros by beating Zalaegerszegi TE 1–0 in the 2026 Magyar Kupa final at Puskás Aréna.

== Style of play ==
Keane was renowned for his pace, dribbling skills, and creativity. Although he used many goal celebrations throughout his career, Keane's signature goalscoring celebration involved him performing a cartwheel, followed by a forward roll, and subsequently standing up and mimicking gesture of firing pistols with his hands.

== Personal life ==
Keane married Xposé presenter and former Miss Ireland contestant Claudine Palmer in Ballybrack on 7 June 2008. They have two sons, born in 2009 and 2015. As of 2023, the elder son was playing for Shamrock Rovers.

Keane is a cousin of English singer Morrissey, and has himself been noted for his singing skills. His first cousin is Jason Byrne, the second-highest goalscorer in League of Ireland history. Keane holds a U.S. green card which qualifies him as a domestic player for MLS roster purposes. He achieved his UEFA "A" Licence in January 2016, via the Football Association of Ireland's Coach Education Programme.

Keane stated his support for the legalisation of same-sex marriage in Ireland ahead of the referendum in 2015.

Keane and his family are of Roman Catholic faith. He has a crucifix tattooed on his upper left arm.

Keane is an ambassador for the Children's Medical & Research Foundation in Crumlin, Dublin. Accompanied by his LA Galaxy teammates, Keane personally presented the hospital with a cheque for $50,000 from the LA Galaxy Foundation and Herbalife on 18 February 2015.

Keane and his wife Claudine supported the "Our Hospital Heroes" appeal by raising money for front line workers in hospitals across Ireland, by setting up a GoFundMe page after a family member was diagnosed with COVID-19 and had to be admitted to hospital.

== Career statistics ==
=== Club ===
Appearances and goals by club, season and competition
Club	Season	League			National cup (Note: Includes FA Cup, Coppa Italia, Scottish Cup, U.S. Open Cup, AIFF Super Cup)		League cup (Note: Includes Football League Cup)		Continental		Other		Total	
Club	Season	Division	Apps	Goals	Apps	Goals	Apps	Goals	Apps	Goals	Apps	Goals	Apps	Goals
Wolverhampton Wanderers	1997–98	First Division	38	11	3	0	4	0	—		—		45	11
Wolverhampton Wanderers	1998–99	First Division	33	11	2	2	4	3	—		—		39	16
Wolverhampton Wanderers	1999–2000	First Division	2	2	—		1	0	—		—		3	2
Wolverhampton Wanderers	Total		73	24	5	2	9	3	0	0	0	0	87	29
Coventry City	1999–2000	Premier League	31	12	3	0	0	0	—		—		34	12
Inter Milan	2000–01	Serie A	6	0	3	1	—		4 (Note: One appearance in UEFA Champions League, three appearances and one goal in UEFA Cup)	1	1 (Note: Appearance in Supercoppa Italiana)	1	14	3
Leeds United (loan)	2000–01	Premier League	18	9	2	0	—		—		—		20	9
Leeds United	2001–02	Premier League	25	3	0	0	2	3	6 (Note: Appearances in UEFA Cup)	3	—		33	9
Leeds United	2002–03	Premier League	3	1	—		—		—		—		3	1
Leeds United	Leeds total		46	13	2	0	2	3	6	3	0	0	56	19
Tottenham Hotspur	2002–03	Premier League	29	13	1	0	2	0	—		—		32	13
Tottenham Hotspur	2003–04	Premier League	34	14	3	1	4	1	—		—		41	16
Tottenham Hotspur	2004–05	Premier League	35	11	6	3	4	3	—		—		45	17
Tottenham Hotspur	2005–06	Premier League	36	16	1	0	1	0	—		—		38	16
Tottenham Hotspur	2006–07	Premier League	27	11	5	5	3	1	9	5	—		44	22
Tottenham Hotspur	2007–08	Premier League	36	15	3	2	5	2	10	4	—		54	23
Tottenham Hotspur	Total		197	80	19	11	19	7	19	9	0	0	254	107
Liverpool	2008–09	Premier League	19	5	1	0	1	0	7 (Note: Appearances in UEFA Champions League)	2	—		28	7
Tottenham Hotspur	2008–09	Premier League	14	5	—		—		—		—		14	5
Tottenham Hotspur	2009–10	Premier League	20	6	2	1	3	2	—		—		25	9
Tottenham Hotspur	2010–11	Premier League	7	0	—		1	1	5	0	—		13	1
Tottenham Hotspur	Total		41	11	2	1	4	3	5	0	0	0	52	15
Celtic (loan)	2009–10	Scottish Premier League	16	12	3	4	0	0	—		—		19	16
West Ham United (loan)	2010–11	Premier League	9	2	1	0	—		—		—		10	2
LA Galaxy	2011	MLS	4	2	0	0	—		3 (Note: Appearances in CONCACAF Champions League)	1	4 (Note: Appearances in MLS Cup playoffs)	1	11	4
LA Galaxy	2012	MLS	28	16	0	0	—		3	1	6	6	37	23
LA Galaxy	2013	MLS	23	16	0	0	—		5	3	2	0	30	19
LA Galaxy	2014	MLS	29	19	1	0	—		2	2	5	2	37	23
LA Galaxy	2015	MLS	24	20	2	3	—		1	2	1	0	28	25
LA Galaxy	2016	MLS	17	10	0	0	—		2	0	3	0	22	10
LA Galaxy	Total		125	83	3	3	0	0	16	9	21	9	165	104
Aston Villa (loan)	2011–12	Premier League	6	3	1	0	—		—		—		7	3
ATK	2017–18	Indian Super League	9	6	2	2	—		—		—		11	8
Career total			578	251	45	24	35	16	57	24	22	10	737	325

=== International ===
Appearances and goals by national team and year
National team	Year	Apps	Goals
Republic of Ireland	1998	5	2
Republic of Ireland	1999	8	3
Republic of Ireland	2000	9	2
Republic of Ireland	2001	7	1
Republic of Ireland	2002	11	6
Republic of Ireland	2003	7	4
Republic of Ireland	2004	10	6
Republic of Ireland	2005	7	1
Republic of Ireland	2006	6	4
Republic of Ireland	2007	8	3
Republic of Ireland	2008	7	3
Republic of Ireland	2009	11	6
Republic of Ireland	2010	8	4
Republic of Ireland	2011	10	8
Republic of Ireland	2012	8	1
Republic of Ireland	2013	9	8
Republic of Ireland	2014	7	3
Republic of Ireland	2015	5	2
Republic of Ireland	2016	3	1
Total		146	68

=== Managerial ===
As of 16 May 2026

Team	Nat.	From	To	Record				
Team	Nat.	From	To	M	W	D	L	Win %
ATK	(India)	3 March 2018	31 May 2018	3	2	0	1	66.67
Maccabi Tel Aviv	(Israel)	26 June 2023	7 June 2024	56	41	9	6	73.21
Ferencváros	(Hungary)	6 January 2025	23 May 2026	82	51	16	15	62.20
Total				141	94	25	22	66.67

== Honours ==
=== Player ===
Tottenham Hotspur

- Football League Cup: 2007–08

LA Galaxy

- MLS Cup: 2011, 2012, 2014
- Supporters' Shield: 2011

Republic of Ireland U18

- UEFA European Under-18 Championship: 1998

Republic of Ireland

- Nations Cup: 2011

Individual

- FAI Young International Player of the Year: 1998, 1999
- Tottenham Hotspur Player of the Year: 2003, 2005–06, 2007–08
- Premier League Player of the Month: August 1999, January 2001, April 2007
- PFA Team of the Year: 1997–98 First Division
- Scottish Premier League Player of the Month: March 2010
- Celtic Player of the Year: 2009–10
- FAI International Goal of the Year: 2004 (vs. Netherlands), 2005 (vs. Israel), 2009 (vs. France)
- FAI Senior International Player of the Year: 2009, 2013
- MLS Best XI: 2012, 2013, 2014, 2015
- MLS Player of the Month: July 2012, August 2013
- MLS MVP: 2014
- MLS Cup MVP: 2014
- Best MLS Player ESPY: 2015
- MLS All-Star: 2015
- LA Galaxy Most Valuable Player: 2012, 2013, 2014, 2015

=== Manager ===
Maccabi Tel Aviv

- Israeli Premier League: 2023–24
- Toto Cup Al: 2024

Ferencváros

- Nemzeti Bajnokság I: 2024–25
- Magyar Kupa: 2025–26

== See also ==
- List of men's footballers with 100 or more international caps
- List of men's footballers with 50 or more international goals
