= 1955–56 Hapoel Haifa F.C. season =

Hapoel Haifa
1955–56 season
- Manager: Ya'akov Stern
- Stadium: Kiryat Haim Stadium; Kiryat Eliezer Stadium
- Liga Alef (1955) Liga Leumit (1956): 9th 6th
- State Cup: Quarter-finals
- Top goalscorer: Avraham Ginzburg; Avraham Nestenfober; Ze'ev Schneid (10)

The 1955–56 Hapoel Haifa season was the club's 33rd season since its establishment in 1924, and 8th since the establishment of the State of Israel.

At the start of the season, the league which started during the previous season was completed, with the club finishing 9th. The new league season, with the top division being renamed Liga Leumit, began on 3 December 1955 and was completed on 3 June 1956, with the club finishing 6th.

During the season, the club also competed in the State Cup, which was also carried over the summer break. The club was eliminated by city rivals Maccabi Haifa in the quarter finals, losing 0–4.

On 15 September 1955 a new stadium, Kiryat Eliezer Stadium, officially called Haifa Municipal Stadium or Luigi Antonini Stadium, was opened with a match between a Haifa XI and a Tel Aviv XI. Hapoel Haifa started playing home matches in the stadium on 16 October 1955, starting with a match against Hapoel Balfouria.

== Match Results ==
=== Legend ===
Win Draw Loss

=== International friendly matches ===
During the season Hapoel Haifa played one international friendly match, against Sunderland, which the club lost.

13 May 1956	Hapoel Haifa	2–4	Sunderland	Haifa
	Ginzburg	HaTzofe	Fleming; Shackleton; Holden	Stadium: Kiryat Eliezer Stadium; Attendance: 6,000

=== 1954–55 Liga Alef ===
The league began on 6 February 1955, and by the time the previous season ended, only 20 rounds of matches were completed, with the final 6 rounds being played during September and October 1955.

==== Final table ====
Pos	Club	P	W	D	L	GF	GA	GR	Pts	
7	Maccabi Petah Tikva	26	10	7	9	37	41	0.90	27	
8	Maccabi Rehovot	26	11	4	11	49	48	1.02	26	
9	Hapoel Haifa	26	9	6	11	40	55	0.73	24	
10	Hapoel Ramat Gan	26	10	3	13	35	41	0.85	23	
11	Beitar Jerusalem	26	8	5	13	37	59	0.63	21	Promotion/relegation play-offs

==== Matches ====
3 September 1955 21	Maccabi Tel Aviv	6–0	Hapoel Haifa	Tel Aviv
	Miremovich 25', 54', 61', 75'; R. Levi 28'; Studinski 78'	Report (p. 8)		Stadium: Basa Stadium; Attendance: 3,000; Referee: Ben-Rubi

10 September 1955 22	Hapoel Haifa	1–0	Beitar Tel Aviv	Haifa
	Gilerman 3'	Report (p. 8)		Stadium: Kiryat Haim Stadium; Attendance: 2,500; Referee: Werner

24 September 1955 23	Maccabi Haifa	4–1	Hapoel Haifa	Haifa
	Hardy 41'; Fuchs 65'; Held 75'; Tenenbaum 87'	Report (p. 8)	24' Kremer	Stadium: Kiryat Eliezer Stadium; Attendance: 6,000; Referee: Fritzner

1 October 1955 24	Hapoel Haifa	3–9	Hapoel Petah Tikva	Haifa
	Kremer 13'; Nestenfober 65'; Schneid 71'	Report (p. 8)	2', 12', 29', 39', 87' Stelmach; 35' Chirik; 70', 73', 86' Kofman	Stadium: Kiryat Haim Stadium; Attendance: 3,000; Referee: Dudkevich

8 October 1955 25	Hapoel Hadera	0–1	Hapoel Haifa	Hadera
		Report (p. 8)	32' M. Simantiris	Stadium: Hapoel Ground; Attendance: 1,000; Referee: Frizner

15 October 1955 26	Hapoel Haifa	3–1	Hapoel Balfouria	Haifa
	Diamant 35'; M. Simantiris 41'; Schneid 61'	Report (p. 8)	80' (o.g.) Ben-Nun	Stadium: Kiryat Eliezer Stadium; Attendance: 1,500; Referee: Zahavi

==== Results by match ====
Round	1	2	3	4	5	6	7	8	9	10	11	12	13	14	15	16	17	18	19	20	21	22	23	24	25	26
Result	D	W	L	L	W	W	D	L	L	W	L	D	L	L	D	L	W	W	D	D	L	W	L	L	W	W
Position	7	6	6	8	7	5	6	7	7	7	7	7	8	9	9	10	9	10	10	10	10	9	11	11	10	9

Updated to match(es) played on 15 October 1955. Source: 2 Dear Points
W = Win; D = Draw; L = Loss

=== 1955–56 Liga Leumit ===
==== Final table ====
Pos	Club	P	W	D	L	GF	GA	GR	Pts
4	Maccabi Petah Tikva	22	10	7	5	47	34	1.38	27
5	Maccabi Haifa	22	11	3	8	51	29	1.76	25
6	Hapoel Haifa	22	9	4	9	32	39	0.82	22
7	Beitar Tel Aviv	22	10	0	12	42	44	0.95	20
8	Maccabi Netanya	22	9	2	11	31	44	0.70	20

==== Matches ====
3 December 1955 1	Maccabi Jaffa	1–2	Hapoel Haifa	Tel Aviv
	Gal 22'		3' Schneid; 55' Ben-David	Stadium: Maccabi Jaffa Ground; Attendance: 3,000; Referee: Dudkevich

10 December 1955 2	Hapoel Haifa	1–3	Beitar Tel Aviv	Haifa
	Diamant 45'		57' Huli; 60' Shchinik; 70' Gleit	Stadium: Kiryat Eliezer Stadium; Attendance: 1,000; Referee: Zahavi

17 December 1955 3	Hapoel Ramat Gan	1–0	Hapoel Haifa	Givatayim
	Kirschenberg 76' (pen.)			Stadium: Hamakhtesh Stadium; Attendance: 1,800; Referee: Dudkevich

24 December 1955 4	Hapoel Tel Aviv	5–1	Hapoel Haifa	Tel Aviv
	Weiss 27'; Balut 39'; Rosenbaum 49', 89'; Yehudayoff 77'		24', o.g.' Cynowicz	Stadium: Basa Stadium; Attendance: 4,000; Referee: Zahavi

31 December 1955 5	Hapoel Haifa	3–2	Maccabi Netanya	Haifa
	Nestenfober 27', 65'; Ginzburg 35'		2', 64' Lemel	Stadium: Kiryat Eliezer Stadium; Attendance: 2,000; Referee: Hechtberg

7 January 1956 6	Hapoel Haifa	3–0	Hapoel Kfar Saba	Haifa
	Ginzburg 40'; Martin 79' (pen.); Nestenfober 89'			Stadium: Kiryat Eliezer Stadium; Attendance: 3,500; Referee: Moshe Cohen

14 January 1956 7	Hapoel Haifa	3–0	Maccabi Rehovot	Haifa
	Nestenfober 4'; Ben-David 24'; Ginzburg 83'			Stadium: Kiryat Eliezer Stadium; Referee: Rosenbaum

21 January 1956 8	Maccabi Haifa	5–0	Hapoel Haifa	Haifa
	Hardy 39'; S. Levi 60', 86', 89'; Almani 76'			Stadium: Kiryat Eliezer Stadium; Attendance: 6,500; Referee: Ben-Rubi

11 February 1956 9	Hapoel Petah Tikva	2–2	Hapoel Haifa	Petah Tikva
	Kofman 22' (Pen.); Zelikovich 35'		57' Schneid; 62' M. Simantiris	Stadium: Hapoel Ground; Attendance: 3,000; Referee: Rosenbaum

18 February 1956 10	Maccabi Tel Aviv	2–0	Hapoel Haifa	Tel Aviv
	R. Levi 61', 74'			Stadium: Basa Stadium; Referee: Fritzner

25 February 1956 11	Hapoel Haifa	3–2	Maccabi Petah Tikva	Haifa
	Schneid 24', 63'; Schlanger 45'		40' Spiegel; 82' Rabinson	Stadium: Kiryat Eliezer Stadium; Attendance: 5,000; Referee: Rosenbaum

3 March 1956 12	Hapoel Haifa	3–1	Maccabi Jaffa	Haifa
	Martin 25' (pen.); Schneid 68'; Nestenfober 82'		48' Ghougasian	Stadium: Kiryat Eliezer Stadium; Attendance: 4,000; Referee: M. Cohen

10 March 1956 13	Beitar Tel Aviv	2–3	Hapoel Haifa	Tel Aviv
	Huli 49'; Arbiv 81'		51' Ginzburg; 63' (pen.) Martin; 72' M. Simantiris	Stadium: Maccabi Jaffa Ground; Referee: Schwartz

17 March 1956 14	Hapoel Haifa	2–3	Hapoel Ramat Gan	Haifa
	Martin 26' (pen.); Nestenfober 57'		15' Mesika; 60' Migdalovich; 86' Kirschenberg	Stadium: Kiryat Eliezer Stadium; Referee: Werner

24 March 1956 15	Hapoel Haifa	2–2	Hapoel Tel Aviv	Haifa
	Nestenfober 1'; Ginzburg 60'		37', 50' Yehudayoff	Stadium: Kiryat Eliezer Stadium; Attendance: 5,000; Referee: Moshe Cohen

31 March 1956 16	Maccabi Netanya	3–1	Hapoel Haifa	Netanya
	Shrager 5'; Lemel 11'; Hosias 60'		2' Ginzburg	Stadium: Sar-Tov Stadium; Attendance: 2,000; Referee: Werner

7 April 1956 17	Hapoel Kfar Saba	0–1	Hapoel Haifa	Kfar Saba
			87' Ginzburg	Stadium: Hapoel Ground; Referee: Fritzner

14 April 1956 18	Maccabi Rehovot	1–0	Hapoel Haifa	Rehovot
	Vider 86'			Stadium: Maccabi Ground; Referee: Werner

22 April 1956 19	Hapoel Haifa	0–0	Maccabi Haifa	Haifa
				Stadium: Kiryat Eliezer Stadium; Attendance: 7,000; Referee: Sher

19 May 1956 20	Hapoel Haifa	1–0	Hapoel Petah Tikva	Haifa
	Schneid 73'			Stadium: Kiryat Eliezer Stadium; Attendance: 6,000; Referee: Moshe Cohen

27 May 1956 21	Hapoel Haifa	0–3	Maccabi Tel Aviv	Haifa
			52' Schneor; 54' Israeli; 74' Glazer	Stadium: Kiryat Eliezer Stadium; Attendance: 6,000; Referee: Ben-Rubi

2 June 1956 22	Maccabi Petah Tikva	1–1	Hapoel Haifa	Petah Tikva
	Spiegel 35'		48' Ginzburg	Stadium: Maccabi Ground

==== Results by match ====
Round	1	2	3	4	5	6	7	8	9	10	11	12	13	14	15	16	17	18	19	20	21	22
Result	W	L	L	L	W	W	W	L	D	L	W	W	W	L	D	L	W	L	D	W	L	D
Position	3	8	9	9	7	7	5	7	7	7	7	6	5	6	7	7	6	6	6	6	6	6

Updated to match(es) played on 28 July 1956. Source: IFA
W = Win; D = Draw; L = Loss

=== State Cup ===
27 August 1955 QF	Maccabi Haifa	4–0	Hapoel Haifa	Haifa
	Georgiou 36'; Hardy 37'; Held 53'; Fuchs 71'	Report (p. 8)		Stadium: Kiryat Haim Stadium; Attendance: 3,000; Referee: Ben-Rubi
