= 1954–55 Hapoel Haifa F.C. season =

Hapoel Haifa
1954–55 season
- Manager: Gedalyahu Fuchs; Shlomo Poliakov
- Stadium: Kiryat Haim Stadium
- Liga Alef: not completed
- State Cup: not completed
- Top goalscorer: League: Shmuel Kramer; Mordechai Martin (5); All: Ze'ev Schneid (6)

The 1954–55 Hapoel Haifa season was the club's 32nd season since its establishment in 1924, and 7th since the establishment of the State of Israel.

During the season, the club competed in Liga Alef (top division) and the State Cup.

== Review and events ==
- The club played one international friendly match during the season, against Beşiktaş, on 25 September 1954. At the match the club was strengthened with players from Hapoel Kiryat Haim and Hapoel Tirat HaCarmel and was billed as Haifa Region Hapoel XI. Beşiktaş won the match 1–2, Mordechai Martin scoring the lone goal for the hosts.

== Match Results ==
=== Legend ===
Win Draw Loss

=== Liga Alef ===
League matches began on 6 February 1955, and by the time the season, only 20 rounds of matches were completed, delaying the end of the league season to the next season.

==== League table (as of 2 July 1955) ====
Pos	Club	P	W	D	L	GF	GA	GR	Pts
8	Hapoel Kfar Saba	20	6	6	8	29	30	0.97	18
9	Maccabi Rehovot	20	7	4	9	35	37	0.95	18
10	Hapoel Haifa	20	6	6	8	31	35	0.89	18
11	Hapoel Ramat Gan	20	7	3	10	23	27	0.85	17
12	Beitar Jerusalem	20	5	5	10	27	47	0.57	15

==== Matches ====
5 February 1955 1	Hapoel Haifa	1–1	Beitar Jerusalem	Haifa
	M. Simantiris 88'	Report (p. 8)	Hasson 27'	Stadium: Kiryat Haim Stadium; Attendance: 2,000; Referee: Ben-Rubi

12 February 1955 2	Maccabi Rehovot	2–3	Hapoel Haifa	Rehovot
	Melamed 12'; Vider 38'	Report (p. 8)	21' Diamant; 35', 52' M. Simantiris	Stadium: Maccabi Ground; Attendance: 1,800; Referee: Zahavi

19 February 1955 3	Hapoel Tel Aviv	1–0	Hapoel Haifa	Tel Aviv
	Zilberstein 19'	Report (p. 8)		Stadium: Basa Stadium; Attendance: 6,000; Referee: Fried

26 February 1955 4	Maccabi Petah Tikva	3–0	Hapoel Haifa	Petah Tikva
	Bernard 38', 72'; Nadel 90'	Report (p. 8)		Stadium: Maccabi Ground; Attendance: 1,200; Referee: Frizner

5 March 1955 5	Hapoel Haifa	3–1	Hapoel Kfar Saba	Haifa
	M. Simantiris 33'; Kramer 48'; Shamir 85'	Report (p. 8)	25' Schmilovich	Stadium: Kiryat Haim Stadium; Attendance: 2,000; Referee: Rosenbaum

12 March 1955 6	Hapoel Haifa	2–0	Hapoel Ramat Gan	Haifa
	Kramer 1', 59'	Report (p. 8)		Stadium: Kiryat Haim Stadium; Attendance: 1,500; Referee: Zahavi

19 March 1955 7	Maccabi Netanya	2–2	Hapoel Haifa	Netanya
	M. Cohen 10', 60'	Report (p. 8)	17', 70' Martin	Stadium: Sar-Tov Stadium; Attendance: 1,000; Referee: Cohen

2 April 1955 8	Hapoel Haifa	1–2	Maccabi Tel Aviv	Haifa
	Shamir 10'		26' Turika; 70' Studinski	Stadium: Kiryat Haim Stadium; Referee: Dudkevich

9 April 1955 9	Beitar Tel Aviv	4–2	Hapoel Haifa	Tel Aviv
	Emaliah 20'; Huli 59', 70'; Gleit 62'	Report (p. 8)	68' Kramer; 87' (pen.) Martin	Stadium: Basa Stadium; Attendance: 2,000; Referee: Moshe Cohen

13 April 1955 10	Hapoel Haifa	4–0	Maccabi Haifa	Haifa
	Schneid 18', 63'; Shamir 43'; Kramer 72'	Report		Stadium: Kiryat Haim Stadium; Attendance: 3,500; Referee: Ben-Rubi

16 April 1955 11	Hapoel Petah Tikva	3–1	Hapoel Haifa	Petah Tikva
	Stelmach 34', 67'; Chirik 53'	Report (p. 8)	63' (pen.) Martin	Stadium: Hapoel Ground; Attendance: 2,500; Referee: Rosenbaum

23 April 1955 12	Hapoel Haifa	2–2	Hapoel Hadera	Haifa
	Shamir 67'; Martin 72' (pen.)	Report (p. 8)	20' Piterman; 48' Weissberg	Stadium: Kiryat Haim Stadium; Attendance: 200; Referee: Werner

30 April 1955 13	Hapoel Balfouria	2–1	Hapoel Haifa	Afula
	Tal 47'; Yeshu'a 86'	Report (p. 8)	74' Schneid	Stadium: Hapoel Ground; Attendance: 1,000

14 May 1955 14	Beitar Jerusalem	3–0	Hapoel Haifa	Jerusalem
	Elfasi 22', 25' (pen.), 72'	Report (p. 8)		Stadium: YMCA Stadium; Attendance: 6,000; Referee: Rosenbaum

21 May 1955 15	Hapoel Haifa	1–1	Maccabi Rehovot	Haifa
	Gillerman 6'	Report (p. 8)	22' Schmilovich	Stadium: Kiryat Haim Stadium; Referee: Metzler

4 June 1955 16	Hapoel Haifa	0–4	Hapoel Tel Aviv	Haifa
		Report (p. 8)	25', 77' Weiss; 54', 85' Michaelov	Stadium: Kiryat Haim Stadium; Attendance: 3,500; Referee: Dudkevich

11 June 1955 17	Hapoel Haifa	3–0 (w/o) (abandoned)	Maccabi Petah Tikva	Haifa
	Nestenfober 28'; Orbach 31'	Report (p. 8)		Stadium: Kiryat Haim Stadium; Attendance: 1,800; Referee: Werner

19 June 1955 18	Hapoel Kfar Saba	1–2	Hapoel Haifa	Kfar Saba
	Tzahobel 33'	Report (p. 8)	54' Nestenfober; 78' Diamant	Stadium: Hapoel Ground; Attendance: 800; Referee: Hillman

26 June 1955 19	Hapoel Ramat Gan	2–2	Hapoel Haifa	Givatayim
	Radler 25'; Kirschenberg 58' (pen.)	Report (p. 8)	1' Orbach; 26' (pen.) Neumann	Stadium: HaMakhtesh Stadium; Attendance: 1,500; Referee: Markovich

3 July 1955 20	Hapoel Haifa	1–1	Maccabi Netanya	Haifa
	Gillerman 47'	Report (p. 8)	70' Spiegel	Stadium: Kiryat Haim Stadium; Attendance: 2,500; Referee: Sher

==== Results by match ====
Match	1	2	3	4	5	6	7	8	9	10	11	12	13	14	15	16	17	18	19	20
Result	D	W	L	L	W	W	D	L	L	W	L	D	L	L	D	L	W	W	D	D
Position	7	6	6	8	7	5	6	7	7	7	7	7	8	9	9	10	9	10	10	10

Updated to match(es) played on 3 July 1955. Source: 2 Dear Points
W = Win; D = Draw; L = Loss

=== State Cup ===
26 March 1955 Round 3	Hapoel Haifa	4–1	Hapoel Even Yehuda	Haifa
	Glassberg 3'; Schneid 12', 45', 67'		43' Baron	Stadium: Kiryat Haim Stadium; Attendance: 1,500; Referee: Asa

28 May 1955 Round 4	Hapoel Haifa	w/o	Maccabi Jerusalem	Haifa
				Stadium: Kiryat Haim Stadium
