= George Diba =

Israeli footballer

Personal information
- Full name: George Diba
- Date of birth: 1 July 1998 (age 28)
- Place of birth: Marjayoun, Lebanon
- Height: 1.86 m (6 ft 1 in)
- Position: Centre-back

Team information
- Current team: Hapoel Haifa
- Number: 25

Youth career
- 2008–2016: Hapoel Mate Asher
- 2016–2017: Maccabi Tzur Shalom

Senior career*
| Years | Team | Apps | (Gls) |
| 2017–2019 | Maccabi Tzur Shalom | 67 | (1) |
| 2019–2021 | Hapoel Acre | 60 | (1) |
| 2021–2022 | Hapoel Tel Aviv | 4 | (0) |
| 2022 | F.C. Ashdod | 5 | (0) |
| 2022–2023 | Hapoel Acre | 29 | (0) |
| 2023– | Hapoel Haifa | 89 | (1) |
- * Club domestic league appearances and goals as of 24 June 2026

George Diba (Arabic: جورج دبا, Hebrew: ג'ורג' דיבה; born 1 July 1998) is an Israeli professional footballer who plays as a centre-back for Hapoel Haifa.

== Early life ==
Diba was born in Marjayoun, Lebanon, to a family of Maronite descent. His parents were fighters in the South Lebanon Army. On 24 May 2000, they emigrated to Israel, following the IDF's withdrawal from Lebanon and settle down in Nahariya.

== Club career ==
On 17 July 2021, Diba signed for three years with Hapoel Tel Aviv.
