= 2023–24 Toto Cup Al =

Tournament details
- Country: Israel
- Teams: 14

Final positions
- Champions: Maccabi Tel Aviv (8th title)
- Runners-up: Maccabi Haifa
- Semifinalists: Maccabi Petah Tikva; Bnei Sakhnin

Tournament statistics
- Matches played: 30
- Goals scored: 75 (2.5 per match)
- All statistics correct as of 25 January 2024.

The 2023–24 Toto Cup Al was the 39th season of the football tournament in Israel since its introduction and the 17th tournament involving Israeli Premier League clubs only.

Maccabi Netanya were the defending champions but could only finish in the 7th place.

== Format ==
The four clubs playing in the UEFA competitions (Maccabi Haifa, Hapoel Be'er Sheva, Maccabi Tel Aviv and Beitar Jerusalem) did not take part in the group stage, while the remaining ten clubs were divided into two groups of five, at the end of the group stage each of the group winners will qualify to the semi-finals. Maccabi Haifa and Beitar Jerusalem played in the 2023 Israel Super Cup match for a place in one of the semi-finals (meeting the group winner with the least points accumulated), while Hapoel Be'er Sheva and Maccabi Tel Aviv played for a place in the other semi-final (meeting the group winner with the most points accumulated). All clubs will participate in classification play-offs to determine their final positions.

== Group stage ==
Groups were allocated according to geographic distribution of the clubs, with the northern clubs allocated to Group A, and the southern clubs allocated to Group B. Each club will play the other clubs once.

The matches have started on 29 July 2023.

=== Group A ===
Pos	Team	Pld	W	D	L	GF	GA	GD	Pts	Qualification	BnS	MNE	HHA	HHD	MBR
1	Bnei Sakhnin	4	3	0	1	5	5	0	9	Semi-finals		0–3		2–1	
2	Maccabi Netanya	4	2	1	1	7	3	+4	7	5–8th classification play-offs			1–2	3–1	
3	Hapoel Haifa	4	1	1	2	4	5	−1	4	9–10th classification play-offs	0–1				1–1
4	Hapoel Hadera	4	1	1	2	5	7	−2	4	11–12th classification play-offs			2–1		1–1
5	Maccabi Bnei Reineh	4	0	3	1	3	4	−1	3	13–14th classification play-offs	1–2	0–0			

Source: Israel Football Association, One.co.il
Legend: Blue = home team win; Yellow = draw; Red = away team win.
Rules for classification: 1) points; 2) goal difference; 3) number of wins; 4) goals scored; 5) head to head; 6) higher position in the last season.

=== Group B ===
Pos	Team	Pld	W	D	L	GF	GA	GD	Pts	Qualification	MPT	HJE	ASH	HTA	HPT
1	Maccabi Petah Tikva	4	2	2	0	5	2	+3	8	Semi-finals		2–1			0–0
2	Hapoel Jerusalem	4	2	1	1	9	4	+5	7	5–8th classification play-offs			2–0	1–1	
3	F.C. Ashdod	4	2	1	1	3	3	0	7	9–10th classification play-offs	1–1			1–0	
4	Hapoel Tel Aviv	4	0	2	2	2	5	−3	2	11–12th classification play-offs	0–2				1–1
5	Hapoel Petah Tikva	4	0	2	2	2	7	−5	2	13–14th classification play-offs		1–5	0–1		

Source: Israel Football Association, One.co.il
Legend: Blue = home team win; Yellow = draw; Red = away team win.
Rules for classification: 1) points; 2) goal difference; 3) number of wins; 4) goals scored; 5) head to head; 6) higher position in last season.

== European qualification route ==
=== Israel Super Cup ===
22 July 2023
20:30 IDT (UTC+03:00)

Maccabi Haifa	3–1	Beitar Jerusalem
Chery 58'; David 84'; Khalaily 90+4'	Report	45' Friday

Sammy Ofer Stadium, Haifa
Attendance: 27,953
Referee: Yigal Frid

=== UEFA qualifiers match ===
20 July 2023
20:00 IDT (UTC+03:00)

Hapoel Be'er Sheva	1–6	Maccabi Tel Aviv
Abu Abaid (red card) 51'; Safouri 56'	Report	38' Cohen; 45+4', 47', 52' (pen.) Zahavi; 60' Peretz; 79' Biton

Turner Stadium, Be'er Sheva
Attendance: 13,347
Referee: David Fuxman

== Classification play-offs ==
=== 13–14th classification match ===
21 August 2023 13–14 place	Hapoel Petah Tikva	2–1	Maccabi Bnei Reineh	Petah Tikva
20:00 IDT	Zarvailov 76'; Bassey 88'	Report	51' Hilef	Stadium: HaMoshava Stadium; Attendance: 1,398; Referee: Sapir Berman

=== 11–12th classification match ===
19 August 2023 11–12 place	Hapoel Tel Aviv	1–1 (5–3 p)	Hapoel Hadera	Tel Aviv
19:00 IDT	Tchibota 65'	Report	90' (pen.) Bourard	Stadium: Bloomfield Stadium; Attendance: 3,863; Referee: Majd Rusros
	Penalties
	Einbinder (penalty scored); Blorian (penalty scored); Ožbolt (penalty scored); Rodríguez (penalty scored); Altman (penalty scored)		Bourard (penalty scored); Jan (penalty scored); Unger (penalty scored); Madmon (penalty scored)

=== 9–10th classification match ===
19 August 2023 9–10 place	F.C. Ashdod	0–0 (2–3 p)	Hapoel Haifa	Ashdod
19:00 IDT		Report		Stadium: Yud-Alef Stadium; Attendance: 322; Referee: Dekal Tzino
	Penalties
	Azulay (penalty scored); Stav Turiel (penalty scored); Cohen (penalty missed); Berihon (penalty missed); Mazal (penalty missed)		Melamed (penalty missed); Noy (penalty scored); Santos (penalty scored); Biton (penalty scored)

==== 7–8th classification match ====
20 August 2023 7–8 place	Maccabi Netanya	4–1	Hapoel Be'er Sheva	Netanya
19:30 IDT	Azulay 13', 45'; Bilenkyi 45+3' (pen.); Cohen 60'	Report	22' Sefer	Stadium: Netanya Stadium; Attendance: 3,018; Referee: Yigal Frid

==== 5–6th classification match ====
19 August 2023 5–6 place	Hapoel Jerusalem	1–0	Beitar Jerusalem	Jerusalem
20:30 IDT	Hozez 90+7' (pen.)	Report		Stadium: Teddy Stadium; Attendance: 4,781; Referee: Snir Levi

== Semi-finals ==
20 August 2023 Semi-final	Bnei Sakhnin	1–5	Maccabi Tel Aviv	Sakhnin
20:00 IDT	Taji 54'	Report	16' Peretz; 57', 67' Cohen; 58' Turgeman; 82' Biton	Stadium: Doha Stadium; Referee: Aviad Shiloach

19 August 2023 Semi-final	Maccabi Petah Tikva	0–2	Maccabi Haifa	Petah Tikva
19:30 IDT		Report	74' Khalaily; 81' David	Stadium: HaMoshava Stadium; Attendance: 10,417; Referee: Orel Grinfeld

== Final ==
24 January 2024 Final	Maccabi Tel Aviv	0–0 (4–2 p)	Maccabi Haifa	Netanya, Israel
20:00		Report		Stadium: Netanya Stadium; Referee: Aviad Shiloach
	Penalties
	Zahavi (penalty scored); Kartsev (penalty scored); Davida (penalty scored); Peretz (penalty missed); Luckassen (penalty scored)		(penalty missed) Chery; (penalty missed) Pierrot; (penalty scored) Khalaili; (penalty scored) Cornud

== Final rankings ==
R	Team
1st place, gold medalist(s)	Maccabi Tel Aviv
2nd place, silver medalist(s)	Maccabi Haifa
3rd place, bronze medalist(s)	Maccabi Petah Tikva
3rd place, bronze medalist(s)	Bnei Sakhnin
5	Hapoel Jerusalem
6	Beitar Jerusalem
7	Maccabi Netanya
8	Hapoel Be'er Sheva
9	Hapoel Haifa
10	F.C. Ashdod
11	Hapoel Tel Aviv
12	Hapoel Hadera
13	Hapoel Petah Tikva
14	Maccabi Bnei Reineh
