= Itamar Noy =

Israeli footballer (born 2001)

Itamar Noy איתמר נוי
Personal information
- Date of birth: 28 April 2001 (age 25)
- Place of birth: Lod, Israel
- Height: 1.75 m (5 ft 9 in)
- Position: Midfielder

Team information
- Current team: Maccabi Tel Aviv
- Number: 30

Youth career
- 2015–2019: Hapoel Bnei Lod
- 2019–2020: Maccabi Petah Tikva
- 2020–2021: Hapoel Bnei Lod

Senior career*
Years	Team	Apps	(Gls)
2018–2021	Hapoel Bnei Lod	29	(1)
2021–2022	Hapoel Ashdod	35	(12)
2022–2023	First Vienna	26	(4)
2023–2025	Hapoel Haifa	63	(1)
2025–	Maccabi Tel Aviv	31	(2)

International career^{‡}
2022–2023	Israel U21	2	(0)
2025–	Israel	2	(0)
- * Club domestic league appearances and goals as of 23 June 2026 ‡ National team caps and goals as of 17:50, 11 October 2025 (UTC)

Itamar Noy (Hebrew: איתמר נוי; born 28 April 2001) is an Israeli professional footballer who plays as a midfielder for Israeli Premier League club Maccabi Tel Aviv and the Israel national team.
