= 2015–16 Toto Cup Leumit =

Tournament details
- Country: Israel
- Teams: 16

Final positions
- Champions: Hapoel Ashkelon
- Runners-up: F.C. Ashdod

Tournament statistics
- Matches played: 31
- Goals scored: 66 (2.13 per match)
- Top goal scorer: Din David (5)

The 2015–16 Toto Cup Leumit was the 26th season of the second tier League Cup (as a separate competition) since its introduction. It was held in two stages. First, sixteen Liga Leumit teams were divided into four regionalized groups, from which the winners and runners-up advanced to the quarter-finals. Quarter-finals, semi-finals and the final were then played as one-legged matches.

The defending cup holders were Hapoel Bnei Lod, having won the cup on its previous edition.

In the final, played on 15 December 2015, Hapoel Ashkelon defeated F.C. Ashdod 1–0.

== Group stage ==
Groups were allocated according to geographic distribution of the clubs. The groups were announced by the IFA on took place on 25 June 2015.

The matches are due to be played from 1 August.

=== Tiebreakers ===
If two or more teams are equal on points on completion of the group matches, the following criteria are applied to determine the rankings.

1. Superior goal difference
2. Higher number of victories achieved
3. Higher number of goals scored
4. Higher number of points obtained in the group matches played among the teams in question
5. Superior goal difference from the group matches played among the teams in question
6. Higher number of victories achieved in the group matches played among the teams in question
7. Higher number of goals scored in the group matches played among the teams in question
8. A deciding match, if needed to set which team qualifies to the quarter-finals.

=== Group A ===
| Pos | Team | Pld | W | D | L | GF | GA | GD | Pts | MAN | HAF | MHE | HNI |
|---|---|---|---|---|---|---|---|---|---|---|---|---|---|
| 1 | Maccabi Ahi Nazareth (A) | 3 | 2 | 0 | 1 | 8 | 3 | +5 | 6 | | | 1–0 | 5–0 |
| 2 | Hapoel Afula (A) | 3 | 2 | 0 | 1 | 7 | 3 | +4 | 6 | 3–2 | | | |
| 3 | Maccabi Herzliya | 3 | 2 | 0 | 1 | 2 | 1 | +1 | 6 | | 1–0 | | 1–0 |
| 4 | Hapoel Nazareth Illit | 3 | 0 | 0 | 3 | 0 | 10 | −10 | 0 | | 0–4 | | |

Updated to match(es) played on 4 September 2015. Source: scoresway.com
Legend: Blue = home team win; Yellow = draw; Red = away team win.
Rules for classification: 1st points; 2nd goal difference; 3rd matches won; 4th goals scored; 5th head-to-head; 6th decision match
(A) Advanced to the quarter finals

=== Group B ===
| Pos | Team | Pld | W | D | L | GF | GA | GD | Pts | HRH | HPT | HRL | HRG |
|---|---|---|---|---|---|---|---|---|---|---|---|---|---|
| 1 | Hapoel Ramat HaSharon (A) | 3 | 2 | 1 | 0 | 3 | 1 | +2 | 7 | | | 1–0 | 2–1 |
| 2 | Hapoel Petah Tikva (A) | 3 | 1 | 2 | 0 | 1 | 0 | +1 | 5 | 0–0 | | | |
| 3 | Hapoel Rishon LeZion | 3 | 1 | 0 | 2 | 4 | 3 | +1 | 3 | | 0–1 | | |
| 4 | Hapoel Ramat Gan | 3 | 0 | 1 | 2 | 2 | 6 | −4 | 1 | | 0–0 | 1–4 | |

Updated to match(es) played on 4 September 2015. Source: scoresway.com
Legend: Blue = home team win; Yellow = draw; Red = away team win.
Rules for classification: 1st points; 2nd goal difference; 3rd matches won; 4th goals scored; 5th head-to-head; 6th decision match
(A) Advanced to the quarter finals

=== Group C ===
| Pos | Team | Pld | W | D | L | GF | GA | GD | Pts | HKN | HJE | BTR | HBL |
|---|---|---|---|---|---|---|---|---|---|---|---|---|---|
| 1 | Hapoel Katamon Jerusalem (A) | 3 | 2 | 0 | 1 | 2 | 1 | +1 | 6 | | 1–0 | | 1–0 |
| 2 | Hapoel Jerusalem (A) | 3 | 1 | 1 | 1 | 5 | 3 | +2 | 4 | | | | 3–0 |
| 3 | Beitar Tel Aviv Ramla | 3 | 1 | 1 | 1 | 4 | 6 | −2 | 4 | 1–0 | 2–2 | | |
| 4 | Hapoel Bnei Lod | 3 | 1 | 0 | 2 | 4 | 5 | −1 | 3 | | | 4–1 | |

Updated to match(es) played on 7 September 2015. Source: scoresway.com
Legend: Blue = home team win; Yellow = draw; Red = away team win.
Rules for classification: 1st points; 2nd goal difference; 3rd matches won; 4th goals scored; 5th head-to-head; 6th decision match
(A) Advanced to the quarter finals

=== Group D ===
| Pos | Team | Pld | W | D | L | GF | GA | GD | Pts | HAS | ASH | MYA | MKG |
|---|---|---|---|---|---|---|---|---|---|---|---|---|---|
| 1 | Hapoel Ashkelon (A) | 3 | 2 | 1 | 0 | 4 | 1 | +3 | 7 | | 1–1 | 1–0 | |
| 2 | F.C. Ironi Ashdod (A) | 3 | 1 | 2 | 0 | 4 | 2 | +2 | 5 | | | 1–1 | 2–0 |
| 3 | Maccabi Yavne | 3 | 0 | 2 | 1 | 2 | 3 | −1 | 2 | | | | 1–1 |
| 4 | Maccabi Kiryat Gat | 3 | 0 | 1 | 2 | 1 | 5 | −4 | 1 | 0–2 | | | |

Updated to match(es) played on 7 September 2015. Source: scoresway.com
Legend: Blue = home team win; Yellow = draw; Red = away team win.
Rules for classification: 1st points; 2nd goal difference; 3rd matches won; 4th goals scored; 5th head-to-head; 6th decision match
(A) Advanced to the quarter finals

== Knockout rounds ==
=== Quarter-finals ===
| 20 October 2015 | Maccabi Ahi Nazareth | 0–1 | F.C. Ashdod | Ilut |
| 18:30 | | report | David 12' | Stadium: Ilut Stadium; Referee: Kobi Lechem HaCohen |

| 20 October 2015 | Hapoel Afula | 1–1 (a.e.t.) (3–5 p) | Hapoel Petah Tikva | Afula |
| 19:00 | Dayan 17' | report | Lungu 41' | Stadium: Afula Illit Stadium; Referee: Idan Almalem |
| | Penalties |
| | Martin (penalty scored); Dayan (penalty scored); Shawat (penalty scored); Malul (penalty missed) | | (penalty scored) Azubel; (penalty scored) Mayo; (penalty scored) Kahlon; (penalty scored) Azulay; (penalty scored) S. Cohen |

| 20 October 2015 | Hapoel Katamon Jerusalem | 1–1 (a.e.t.) (5–6 p) | Hapoel Ramat HaSharon | Jerusalem |
| 19:30 | Ben Lulu 67' | report | Uzor 58' | Stadium: Teddy Stadium; Referee: Eliran Ben Simon |
| | Penalties |
| | Adam Mizrahi (penalty scored); Oved (penalty scored); Mazor (penalty scored); Maman (penalty scored); Baruchyan (penalty scored); O. Cohen (penalty missed) | | (penalty scored) Hadida; (penalty scored) Tchalisher; (penalty scored) Ben Yair; (penalty scored) Alesk; (penalty scored) Dvora; (penalty scored) Elkaslasy |

| 21 October 2015 | Hapoel Jerusalem | 0–0 (a.e.t.) (1–3 p) | Hapoel Ashkelon | Jerusalem |
| 19:00 | | report | | Stadium: Teddy Stadium; Referee: Idan Leiba |
| | Penalties |
| | Horev (penalty scored); Bitton (penalty missed); Yosef (penalty missed); Bruno Ricardo (penalty missed) | | (penalty scored) Y. Revivo; (penalty scored) Buzaglo; (penalty missed) Abuhazira; (penalty scored) Dego |

=== Semifinals ===
| 1 December 2015 | Hapoel Petah Tikva | 1–3 (a.e.t.) | F.C. Ashdod | Ramat HaSharon |
| 19:00 | Mayo 32' | Report | David 62', 96'; Kougbenya 111' | Stadium: Grundman Stadium; Referee: Sahar Arbeli |

| 1 December 2015 | Hapoel Ramat HaSharon | 1–2 | Hapoel Ashkelon | Ramla |
| 19:00 | Musa 70' | Report | Haddad 6'; Shriki 78' | Stadium: Municipal Stadium; Referee: David Fuchsman |

== Final ==
15 December 2015
19:00 IST

| F.C. Ashdod | 0–1 | Hapoel Ashkelon |
|---|---|---|
| | Report | Mishpati 88' (o.g.) |

Ness Ziona Stadium
Referee: Raafat el-Hamula

== See also ==
- 2015–16 Toto Cup Al
- 2015–16 Liga Leumit
- 2015–16 Israel State Cup
