= Gal Levi =

Israeli footballer

Personal information
- Date of birth: 9 February 1994 (age 32)
- Place of birth: Rishon LeZion, Israel
- Height: 1.76 m (5 ft 9 1/2 in)
- Position: Midfielder

Team information
- Current team: Maccabi Jaffa
- Number: 7

Youth career
- 2006–2008: Maccabi Tel Aviv
- 2008–2014: Hapoel Rishon LeZion

Senior career*
Years	Team	Apps	(Gls)
2013–2016	Hapoel Rishon LeZion	90	(9)
2016–2018	Maccabi Petah Tikva	10	(0)
2018–2018	Hapoel Ramat Gan	12	(0)
2018–2019	Hapoel Petah Tikva	35	(11)
2019–2021	Hapoel Be'er Sheva	2	(0)
2020	→ Hapoel Rishon LeZion	13	(3)
2021–2022	Beitar Tel Aviv Bat Yam	14	(1)
2022–2023	Maccabi Jaffa	29	(2)
2023–2024	Hapoel Umm al-Fahm	28	(7)
2024–2025	Hapoel Kfar Saba	32	(4)
2025–2026	Hapoel Ra'anana	12	(0)
2026–	Maccabi Jaffa	9	(0)
- * Club domestic league appearances and goals as of 24 June 2026

Gal Levi (Hebrew: גל לוי; born 9 February 1994) is an Israeli footballer who plays as a midfielder for Liga Leumit club Maccabi Jaffa.

== Career ==
=== Early career ===
Levi grew up in the youth departments of Maccabi Tel Aviv and Hapoel Rishon LeZion. On May 3, 2013, 2012–13 season, as a player of the youth team, he made his debut in the senior team uniform in a 0–0 draw against Maccabi Herzliya at Haberfeld Stadium, the Liga Leumit framework. On March 10 he made his second appearance in the league in a 2–2 draw against Maccabi Petah Tikva at HaMoshava Stadium.

In the 2013–14 season, Levi began to establish his position as the senior player in the team, with 32 appearances in the league this season and scoring one goal. In the 2015–16 season he made his first break, scoring 34 league appearances and scoring seven goals.

On July 20, 2016, in the 2016–17 season, Levi signed with Maccabi Petah Tikva of the Israeli Premier League, for the season with an option for three more seasons. On July 31, he made his debut in the Toto Cup with a 0–1 loss to Maccabi Tel Aviv at the Netanya Stadium. On 21 August, he made his debut in the Israeli Premier League in a 2–2 draw against Beitar Jerusalem in the HaMoshava Stadium. In the winter transfer window, 2017–18 season, he signed with Hapoel Ramat Gan from the Liga Leumit until the end of the season. On January 29, 2018, he made his debut in the league with a 1–2 loss to Hapoel Hadera at Afula Illit Stadium.

On August 2, 2018–19 season, Levi signed with Hapoel Petah Tikva of the Liga Leumit for one season. On August 6 he made his debut in the Toto Cup in a 2–1 win over Hapoel Nir Ramat HaSharon at Grundman Stadium, during which he scored his first goal. On August 27 he made his debut as part of the league in a 2–0 victory over Hapoel Bnei Lod at the Lod Municipal Stadium. In this season, Levi made 34 league appearances and scored 11 goals.

=== Hapoel Be'er Sheva ===
On June 4, 2019, the 2019–20 season, Levi signed with Hapoel Be'er Sheva from the Israeli Premier League for three years.

On 21 January 2020 returned to Hapoel Rishon LeZion, as a loan.

== Career statistics ==
As of 1 June 2023

Club	Season	League	League		Cup		League Cup		Europe		Other		Total	
Club	Season	League	Apps	Goals	Apps	Goals	Apps	Goals	Apps	Goals	Apps	Goals	Apps	Goals
Hapoel Rishon LeZion	2012–13	Liga Leumit	2	0	0	0	0	0	–	–	0	0	2	0
Hapoel Rishon LeZion	2013–14	Liga Leumit	32	1	3	0	0	0	–	–	0	0	35	1
Hapoel Rishon LeZion	2014–15	Liga Leumit	22	1	1	0	3	0	–	–	0	0	26	1
Hapoel Rishon LeZion	2015–16	Liga Leumit	34	7	3	0	3	0	–	–	0	0	40	7
Hapoel Rishon LeZion	Total		90	9	7	0	6	0	–	–	0	0	103	9
Maccabi Petah Tikva	2016–17	Israeli Premier League	8	0	0	0	4	1	–	–	0	0	12	1
Maccabi Petah Tikva	2017–18	Israeli Premier League	2	0	0	0	5	0	–	–	0	0	7	0
Maccabi Petah Tikva	Total		10	0	0	0	9	1	–	–	0	0	19	1
Hapoel Ramat Gan	2017–18	Liga Leumit	12	1	0	0	0	0	–	–	0	0	12	1
Hapoel Ramat Gan	Total		12	1	0	0	0	0	–	–	0	0	12	1
Hapoel Petah Tikva	2018–19	Liga Leumit	35	11	1	0	3	1	–	–	0	0	39	12
Hapoel Petah Tikva	Total		35	11	1	0	3	1	–	–	0	0	39	12
Hapoel Be'er Sheva	2019–20	Israeli Premier League	2	0	0	0	0	0	0	0	1	0	3	0
Hapoel Be'er Sheva	2020–21	Israeli Premier League	0	0	0	0	1	0	0	0	2	0	3	0
Hapoel Be'er Sheva	Total		2	0	0	0	1	0	0	0	3	0	6	0
Hapoel Rishon LeZion	2019–20	Liga Leumit	13	1	0	0	0	0	0	0	0	0	13	1
Hapoel Rishon LeZion	Total		13	1	0	0	0	0	0	0	0	0	13	1
Beitar Tel Aviv Bat Yam	2021–22	Liga Leumit	14	1	1	0	0	0	0	0	0	0	15	1
Beitar Tel Aviv Bat Yam	Total		14	1	1	0	0	0	0	0	0	0	15	1
Maccabi Jaffa	2022–23	Liga Leumit	28	2	2	1	1	0	0	0	0	0	0	0
Maccabi Jaffa	Total		28	2	2	1	1	0	0	0	0	0	0	0
Hapoel Umm al-Fahm	2023–24	Liga Leumit	0	0	0	0	0	0	0	0	0	0	0	0
Hapoel Umm al-Fahm	Total		0	0	0	0	0	0	0	0	0	0	0	0
Hapoel Kfar Saba	2024–25	Liga Leumit	28	7	1	0	0	0	0	0	0	0	29	7
Hapoel Kfar Saba	Total		28	7	1	0	0	0	0	0	0	0	29	7
Career total			230	32	12	20	3	0	0	0	2	0	233	35
