= 2017–18 Toto Cup Leumit =

Tournament details
- Country: Israel
- Teams: 16

Final positions
- Champions: Hapoel Afula
- Runners-up: Hapoel Ramat Gan

Tournament statistics
- Matches played: 31
- Goals scored: 89 (2.87 per match)
- Top goal scorer: Yuval Shawat (5)

The 2017–18 Toto Cup Leumit is the 28th season of the second tier League Cup (as a separate competition) since its introduction. It is divided into two stages. First, sixteen Liga Leumit teams were divided into four regionalized groups, with the winners and runners-up advanced to the quarter-finals. Quarter-finals, semi-finals and the final are due to be held as one-legged matches.

The defending cup holders, Maccabi Sha'arayim, are not competing in this edition, as the club was relegated to Liga Alef at the end of the previous season.

In the final, played on 6 December 2017, Hapoel Afula defeated Hapoel Ramat Gan 3–0.

== Group stage ==
Groups were allocated according to geographic distribution of the clubs. The groups were announced by the IFA on took place on 29 June 2017.

=== Tiebreakers ===
If two or more teams are equal on points on completion of the group matches, the following criteria are applied to determine the rankings.

1. Superior goal difference
2. Higher number of victories achieved
3. Higher number of goals scored
4. Higher number of points obtained in the group matches played among the teams in question
5. Superior goal difference from the group matches played among the teams in question
6. Higher number of victories achieved in the group matches played among the teams in question
7. Higher number of goals scored in the group matches played among the teams in question
8. A deciding match, if needed to set which team qualifies to the quarter-finals.

Key to colours in group tables
Group winners and runners-up advanced to the Quarterfinals

=== Group A ===
Pos	Team	Pld	W	D	L	GF	GA	GD	Pts	Qualification or relegation	MAN	HAF	INE	HNI
1	Maccabi Ahi Nazareth	3	3	0	0	9	4	+5	9	Qualified to Quarter-finals	—		2–0	
2	Hapoel Afula	3	2	0	1	5	5	0	6	Qualified to Quarter-finals	3–5	—		1–0
3	Ironi Nesher	3	1	0	2	3	5	−2	3			0–1	—	3–2
4	Hapoel Nazareth Illit	3	0	0	3	3	6	−3	0		1–2			—

Updated to match(es) played on 13 August 2017. Source: Israel Football Association
Rules for classification: 1) points; 2) goal difference; 3) number of wins; 4) goals scored; 5) head to head; 6)deciding match.

=== Group B ===
Pos	Team	Pld	W	D	L	GF	GA	GD	Pts	Qualification or relegation	HKS	HHD	MHZ	HRS
1	Hapoel Kfar Saba	3	3	0	0	9	3	+6	9	Qualified to Quarter-finals	—	4–2	3–0	
2	Hapoel Hadera	3	2	0	1	11	5	+6	6	Qualified to Quarter-finals		—	2–1	
3	Maccabi Herzliya	3	0	1	2	1	5	−4	1				—	0–0
4	Hapoel Ramat HaSharon	3	0	1	2	1	9	−8	1		1–2	0–7		—

Updated to match(es) played on 13 August 2017. Source: Israel Football Association
Rules for classification: 1) points; 2) goal difference; 3) number of wins; 4) goals scored; 5) head to head; 6)deciding match.

=== Group C ===
Pos	Team	Pld	W	D	L	GF	GA	GD	Pts	Qualification or relegation	HTA	HRG	HBL	HPT
1	Hapoel Tel Aviv	3	2	1	0	7	1	+6	7	Qualified to Quarter-finals	—			3–0
2	Hapoel Ramat Gan	3	2	1	0	5	1	+4	7	Qualified to Quarter-finals	0–0	—	3–1	
3	Hapoel Bnei Lod	3	0	1	2	2	7	−5	1		1–4		—	0–0
4	Hapoel Petah Tikva	3	0	1	2	0	5	−5	1			0–2		—

Updated to match(es) played on 13 August 2017. Source: Israel Football Association
Rules for classification: 1) points; 2) goal difference; 3) number of wins; 4) goals scored; 5) head to head; 6)deciding match.

=== Group D ===
Pos	Team	Pld	W	D	L	GF	GA	GD	Pts	Qualification or relegation	HRL	HMR	BTR	HKJ
1	Hapoel Rishon LeZion	3	2	1	0	5	1	+4	7	Qualified to Quarter-finals	—	2–1		3–0
2	Hapoel Marmorek	3	2	0	1	6	4	+2	6	Qualified to Quarter-finals		—	4–2	
3	Beitar Tel Aviv Ramla	3	0	2	1	3	5	−2	2		0–0		—	1–1
4	Hapoel Katamon Jerusalem	3	0	1	2	1	5	−4	1			0–1		—

Updated to match(es) played on 13 August 2017. Source: Israel Football Association
Rules for classification: 1) points; 2) goal difference; 3) number of wins; 4) goals scored; 5) head to head; 6)deciding match.

== Knockout rounds ==
All times are in Israel Standard Time

=== Quarter-finals ===
The draw was held on 22 August 2017.

3 October 2017	Hapoel Tel Aviv	3–1	Hapoel Marmorek	Petah Tikva
19:00	Takiar 29'; Hershkovitz 37'; Exbard 74'	Report	9' Mahpud	Stadium: HaMoshava Stadium; Referee: David Fuchsmann

3 October 2017	Hapoel Afula	1–0	Hapoel Rishon LeZion	Afula
19:00	Tchalisher 87'	Report		Stadium: Afula Illit Stadium; Referee: Ohad Assulin

8 October 2017	Hapoel Ramat Gan	3–0 (a.e.t.)	Hapoel Hadera	Ramat Gan
19:00	Peretz 93', 103'; Berkovic 120+1'			Stadium: Ramat Gan Stadium

8 October 2017	Hapoel Kfar Saba	1–3	Maccabi Ahi Nazareth	Kfar Saba
19:00	Zikri 71'		15' Sliman; 23' Khatib; 90+1' (pen.) Abu Zaid	Stadium: Levita Stadium

=== Semi-finals ===
24 October 2017	Maccabi Ahi Nazareth	0–1	Hapoel Afula	Nesher
19:30		Report	80' Tchalisher	Stadium: Nesher Stadium; Referee: Rafa'at Al-Hamula

24 October 2017	Hapoel Tel Aviv	0–2	Hapoel Ramat Gan	Netanya
20:00		Report	31' Tamir; 34' Rotman	Stadium: Netanya Stadium; Referee: Kobi Lechem HaCohen

=== Final ===
6 December 2017
19:00

Hapoel Afula	3–0	Hapoel Ramat Gan
Yuval Shawat 18', 39' (pen.); Netanel Goldman 54'

Grundman Stadium, Ramat HaSharon
Referee: As'ad Jabarin

== See also ==
- 2017–18 Toto Cup Al
- 2017–18 Liga Leumit
- 2017–18 Israel State Cup
