= Mohammed Adams =

Ghanaian footballer (born 2000)

Personal information
- Date of birth: 11 November 2000 (age 26)
- Place of birth: Accra, Ghana
- Height: 1.92 m (6 ft 4 in)
- Position: Centre-back

Team information
- Current team: Hapoel Afula
- Number: 4

Youth career
- Okyeman Planners

Senior career*
Years	Team	Apps	(Gls)
2019–2021	Okyeman Planners		
2019–2020	→ Liberty Professionals (loan)	7	(0)
2021–2023	Honka II	2	(0)
2021–2023	Honka	5	(0)
2021	→ RoPS (loan)	25	(2)
2021	→ RoPS II (loan)	1	(0)
2022–2023	→ Sporting da Covilhã (loan)	10	(0)
2023–2024	Sporting da Covilhã	21	(3)
2024–2026	Hapoel Ramat Gan	59	(1)
2026–	Hapoel Afula	3	(0)
- * Club domestic league appearances and goals as of 16 September 2026

Mohammed Adams (born 11 November 2000) is a Ghanaian professional football defender for Israeli club Hapoel Afula.

== Club career ==
Adams made his senior debut in his native Ghana with Liberty Professionals in top-tier Ghana Premier League in 2020.

In February 2021, Adams signed with Honka in Finnish Veikkausliiga. On 4 March, he was loaned out to RoPS in second-tier Ykkönen for the 2021 season. He returned to Honka and made his Veikkausliiga debut in the 2022 season, before in July he was loaned out to Liga Portugal 2 club Sporting da Covilhã for the 2022–23 season. After the season, he signed a permanent contract with Covilhã.

For the 2024–25 season, Adams moved to Israel and signed with Hapoel Ramat Gan in the second-tier Liga Leumit.

== Career statistics ==
As of 16 September 2026

Appearances and goals by club, season and competition
Club	Season	League			Cup (Note: Includes Suomen Cup, Taça de Portugal and Israeli State Cup)		League cup (Note: Includes Finnish League Cup and Taça da Liga)		Total	
Club	Season	Division	Apps	Goals	Apps	Goals	Apps	Goals	Apps	Goals
Liberty Professionals (loan)	2019–20	Ghana Premier League	7	0	–		–		7	0
Honka	2021	Veikkausliiga	0	0	0	0	–		0	0
Honka	2022	Veikkausliiga	5	0	1	0	3	0	9	0
Honka	Total		5	0	1	0	3	0	9	0
Honka Akatemia	2022	Kakkonen	2	0	–		–		2	0
RoPS (loan)	2021	Ykkönen	25	2	1	0	–		26	2
RoPS II (loan)	2021	Kakkonen	1	0	–		–		1	0
Sporting da Covilhã (loan)	2022–23	Liga Portugal 2	10	0	1	0	1	0	12	0
Sporting da Covilhã	2023–24	Liga 3	21	3	1	0	–		22	3
Hapoel Ramat Gan	2024–25	Liga Leumit	35	0	3	0	0	0	38	0
Hapoel Ramat Gan	2025–26	Liga Leumit	24	1	2	0	0	0	26	1
Hapoel Ramat Gan	Total		59	1	5	0	0	0	64	1
Hapoel Afula	2026–27	Liga Leumit	3	0	0	0	0	0	3	0
Career total			133	6	9	0	4	0	146	6
