= 2025–26 Liga Leumit =

Liga Leumit
- Season: 2025–26
- Dates: 24 August 2025 – 25 May 2026
- Champions: Maccabi Petah Tikva
- Promoted: Maccabi Petah Tikva; Hapoel Ramat Gan
- Relegated: Hapoel Hadera; Hapoel Nof HaGalil
- Matches: 292
- Goals: 804 (2.75 per match)
- Top goalscorer: Gil Itzhak (16 goals)
- Biggest home win: Maccabi Petah Tikva 6–0 Bnei Yehuda Tel Aviv (20 October 2025)
- Biggest away win: F.C. Kiryat Yam 1–6 Maccabi Jaffa (10 November 2025)
- Highest scoring: Maccabi Jaffa 4–4 Bnei Yehuda Tel Aviv (16 February 2026); Hapoel Rishon LeZion 2–6 Hapoel Kfar Shalem (25 May 2026)
- All statistics correct as of 25 May 2026.

The 2025–26 Liga Leumit is the 27th season as second tier since its realignment in 1999 and the 84th season of second-tier football in Israel.

== Teams ==
A total of sixteen teams are contesting in the league, including twelve sides from the 2024–25 season, the two promoted teams from Liga Alef and the two relegated teams from 2024–25 Israeli Premier League.

=== Team changes ===
The following teams have changed division since the 2023–24 season.

==== To Liga Leumit ====
===== Promoted from Liga Alef =====
- Ironi Modi'in (South Division)
- F.C. Kiryat Yam (North Division)

===== Relegated from Premier League =====
- Hapoel Hadera
- Maccabi Petah Tikva

==== From Liga Leumit ====
===== Promoted to Premier League =====
- Hapoel Tel Aviv
- Hapoel Petah Tikva

===== Relegated to Liga Alef =====
- Hapoel Umm al-Fahm
- Hapoel Nir Ramat HaSharon

- Hapoel Afula was originally relegated to League Alef at the end of the previous season, but due to Hapoel Nir Ramat HaSharon's entry rejection and consequential administrative relegation, they were reinstated.

=== Stadia and locations ===
Locations of the 2025–26 Liga Leumit teams

Club	Home City	Stadium	Capacity
Bnei Yehuda Tel Aviv	Tel Aviv	Hatikva Neighborhood Stadium	2,700
F.C. Kafr Qasim	Kafr Qasim	Bat Yam Municipal Stadium (Note: Play their home games at a neutral venue because their own ground does not meet league requirements.)	2,800
F.C. Kiryat Yam	Kiryat Yam	Acre Municipal Stadium	5,000
Hapoel Acre	Acre	Acre Municipal Stadium	5,000
Hapoel Afula	Afula	Afula Illit Stadium	3,000
Hapoel Hadera	Hadera	Afula Illit Stadium	3,000
Hapoel Kfar Saba	Kfar Saba	Levita Stadium	5,800
Hapoel Kfar Shalem	Tel Aviv	Hatikva Neighborhood Stadium	2,700
Hapoel Nof HaGalil	Nof HaGalil	Green Stadium	5,200
Hapoel Ra'anana	Ra'anana	Ramat Gan Stadium	7,000
Hapoel Ramat Gan	Ramat Gan	Ramat Gan Stadium	7,000
Hapoel Rishon LeZion	Rishon LeZion	Haberfeld Stadium	6,000
Ironi Modi'in	Modi'in-Maccabim-Re'ut	Bat Yam Municipal Stadium	2,800
Maccabi Herzliya	Herzliya	Netanya Stadium	13,610
Maccabi Jaffa	Tel Aviv	Bloomfield Stadium	29,400
Maccabi Petah Tikva	Petah Tikva	HaMoshava Stadium	11,500

== Regular season ==
=== League table ===
Pos	Team	Pld	W	D	L	GF	GA	GD	Pts	Advances
1	Maccabi Petah Tikva	30	17	9	4	67	32	+35	60	Advances to the Promotion playoffs
2	Maccabi Herzliya	30	14	8	8	45	35	+10	50	Advances to the Promotion playoffs
3	Hapoel Ramat Gan	30	14	7	9	48	36	+12	49	Advances to the Promotion playoffs
4	Hapoel Rishon LeZion	30	13	9	8	43	33	+10	48	Advances to the Promotion playoffs
5	Hapoel Kfar Shalem	30	13	8	9	51	47	+4	47	Advances to the Promotion playoffs
6	Bnei Yehuda	30	12	8	10	34	37	−3	44	Advances to the Promotion playoffs
7	F.C. Kiryat Yam	30	13	7	10	43	37	+6	42 (Note: F.C. Kiryat Yam had 4 points deducted)	Advances to the Promotion playoffs
8	Hapoel Kfar Saba	30	11	8	11	38	37	+1	41	Advances to the Promotion playoffs
9	Hapoel Ra'anana	30	10	8	12	29	36	−7	38	Advances to the Relegation playoffs
10	Maccabi Jaffa	30	10	7	13	50	50	0	37	Advances to the Relegation playoffs
11	Hapoel Afula	30	9	9	12	32	48	−16	36	Advances to the Relegation playoffs
12	F.C. Kafr Qasim	30	8	10	12	34	39	−5	34	Advances to the Relegation playoffs
13	Hapoel Nof HaGalil	30	6	14	10	37	45	−8	32	Advances to the Relegation playoffs
14	Ironi Modi'in	30	8	8	14	30	41	−11	32	Advances to the Relegation playoffs
15	Hapoel Acre	30	6	13	11	30	42	−12	31	Advances to the Relegation playoffs
16	Hapoel Hadera	30	4	11	15	32	48	−16	23	Advances to the Relegation playoffs

Source: Soccerway
Rules for classification: 1) points; 2) goal difference; 3) number of wins; 4) goals scored; 5) head to head; 6) deciding match.

=== Results ===
Home \ Away	MPT	MHE	HRG	HRL	FKY	HKH	HKS	BNY	FKQ	HRA	HAF	HAC	MOD	HNG	MJA	HHA
Maccabi Petah Tikva	—	1–1	2–2	2–1	3–2	2–1	2–0	6–0	2–3	1–0	0–1	2–1	5–1	5–1	0–0	2–0
Maccabi Herzliya	3–1	—	0–0	2–0	1–3	2–2	2–2	0–1	1–1	0–2	1–0	2–2	2–1	4–1	3–1	2–1
Hapoel Ramat Gan	0–3	0–2	—	1–2	2–0	3–1	2–1	1–1	2–3	1–0	4–1	1–1	0–1	1–1	1–0	3–1
Hapoel Rishon LeZion	1–1	3–1	4–1	—	0–2	0–1	2–0	0–0	0–2	1–0	1–1	3–1	3–1	0–0	4–1	1–1
F.C. Kiryat Yam	2–2	0–0	0–2	2–0	—	2–0	2–1	2–1	1–1	4–0	1–2	0–0	3–2	2–2	0–6	2–3
Hapoel Kfar Shalem	0–0	0–2	3–1	2–3	1–0	—	1–3	0–3	4–1	2–1	2–0	1–2	3–2	2–2	1–4	3–2
Hapoel Kfar Saba	1–4	1–2	0–0	1–3	0–2	2–3	—	1–0	1–0	1–1	3–3	3–0	2–0	1–1	2–1	1–0
Bnei Yehuda	1–1	2–3	1–0	1–1	1–3	2–3	0–0	—	1–0	1–0	0–1	2–1	1–0	2–1	0–1	2–0
F.C. Kafr Qasim	0–0	0–2	1–3	3–0	1–0	0–3	0–2	1–2	—	0–2	1–2	1–0	0–0	2–3	4–2	2–2
Hapoel Ra'anana	1–2	1–0	0–3	2–1	0–2	1–3	1–1	1–1	1–1	—	1–1	2–1	1–0	2–2	1–2	0–3
Hapoel Afula	2–3	1–0	2–1	0–3	2–0	2–2	1–1	0–1	0–4	0–2	—	2–2	0–0	1–3	0–5	0–1
Hapoel Acre	1–5	1–3	1–1	1–1	0–0	1–1	2–1	2–0	1–1	0–2	0–2	—	0–0	0–2	2–2	1–1
Ironi Modi'in	1–2	1–2	2–3	1–1	0–0	0–0	1–0	3–1	0–0	1–2	3–1	1–0	—	2–1	2–2	1–0
Hapoel Nof HaGalil	2–0	2–1	0–4	0–1	1–2	2–2	0–1	1–1	1–1	0–0	1–1	1–1	3–0	—	0–1	2–2
Maccabi Jaffa	1–6	0–1	2–4	1–1	2–0	1–3	1–2	4–4	1–0	1–1	1–2	0–1	1–0	3–1	—	1–1
Hapoel Hadera	2–2	2–2	0–1	1–2	1–4	1–1	0–3	0–1	0–0	0–1	1–1	1–2	2–3	0–0	3–2	—

Updated to match(es) played on 16 February 2026. Source: Soccerway
Legend: Blue = home team win; Yellow = draw; Red = away team win.

== Promotion playoffs ==
Pos	Team	Pld	W	D	L	GF	GA	GD	Pts	Qualification or relegation	MPT	HRG	MHE	BNY	HKH	FKY	HKS	HRL
1	Maccabi Petah Tikva (P, C)	37	18	13	6	77	42	+35	67	Promoted to Israeli Premier League			1–2	2–2	2–3			2–0
2	Hapoel Ramat Gan (P)	37	18	10	9	59	41	+18	64	Promoted to Israeli Premier League	1–1			1–1	2–1			2–1
3	Maccabi Herzliya	37	17	11	9	55	44	+11	62			0–3			4–2	0–0	1–1	
4	Bnei Yehuda	37	15	12	10	46	44	+2	57				1–1			2–0		2–2
5	Hapoel Kfar Shalem	37	16	8	13	67	63	+4	56					0–1		2–1	2–4	
6	F.C. Kiryat Yam	37	15	9	13	48	43	+5	50 (Note: F.C. Kiryat Yam had 4 points deducted)		0–0	0–1					2–0	
7	Hapoel Kfar Saba	37	13	11	13	52	50	+2	50		2–2	1–1		1–3				
8	Hapoel Rishon LeZion	37	13	10	14	50	54	−4	49				1–2		2–6	1–2	0–5	

Source: Soccerway
Legend: Blue = home team win; Yellow = draw; Red = away team win.
Rules for classification: 1) Points; 2) Points in regular season; 3) Head-to-head points in regular season; 4) Head-to-head goal difference in regular season; 5) Head-to-head goals scored in regular season; 6) Head-to-head away goals scored in regular season (if two teams tied); 7) Goal difference; 8) Goals scored; 9) Fair play ranking; 10) Drawing of lots.
(C) Champions; (P) Promoted

== Relegation playoffs ==
Pos	Team	Pld	W	D	L	GF	GA	GD	Pts	Qualification or relegation	MJA	HRA	HAF	FKQ	MOD	HAC	HNG	HHA
9	Maccabi Jaffa	37	14	9	14	66	58	+8	51				4–1			0–0	2–0	6–1
10	Hapoel Ra'anana	37	13	11	13	42	44	−2	50		0–1			2–2	2–0		4–1	
11	Hapoel Afula	37	11	12	14	39	58	−19	45			0–0		2–0	0–0		2–1	
12	F.C. Kafr Qasim	37	9	14	14	42	49	−7	41		2–2					1–0	1–1	1–2
13	Ironi Modi'in	37	10	10	17	37	47	−10	40		4–1			1–1		0–1		
14	Hapoel Acre	37	8	16	13	40	48	−8	40			1–2	4–1					0–0
15	Hapoel Nof HaGalil (R)	37	7	16	14	44	58	−14	37	Relegated to Liga Alef					0–2	2–2		2–0
16	Hapoel Hadera (R)	37	6	14	17	40	61	−21	32	Relegated to Liga Alef		3–3	1–1		1–0			

Source: Soccerway
Legend: Blue = home team win; Yellow = draw; Red = away team win.
Rules for classification: 1) Points; 2) Points in regular season; 3) Head-to-head points in regular season; 4) Head-to-head goal difference in regular season; 5) Head-to-head goals scored in regular season; 6) Head-to-head away goals scored in regular season (if two teams tied); 7) Goal difference; 8) Goals scored; 9) Fair play ranking; 10) Drawing of lots.
(R) Relegated

== Position by round ==
Team ╲ Round	1	2	3	4	5	6	7	8	9	10	11	12	13	14	15	16	17	18	19	20	21	22	23	24	25	26	27	28	29	30	31	32	33	34	35	36	37
Maccabi Petah Tikva	11	4	10	5	6	4	3	1	1	1	1	1	1	1	1	1	1	1	1	1	1	1	1	1	1	1	1	1	1	1	1	1	1	1	1	1	1
Maccabi Herzliya	3	6	3	6	2	1	1	2	2	2	2	2	2	2	2	2	2	2	2	2	2	2	2	2	2	2	2	2	2	2	2	2	2	3	3	3	3
Hapoel Ramat Gan	7	3	9	11	9	7	6	4	7	8	6	7	8	9	7	8	6	6	8	8	7	3	3	3	4	6	5	5	5	3	3	2	3	2	2	2	2
Bnei Yehuda Tel Aviv	8	13	13	10	10	8	9	10	11	12	13	13	14	14	14	15	12	12	12	12	10	9	8	9	7	7	6	6	7	6	6	7	6	4	4	4	4
Hapoel Kfar Shalem	10	5	2	1	1	5	7	5	3	4	7	4	5	6	5	6	7	7	5	5	3	5	6	6	6	4	4	4	4	5	4	4	4	5	5	5	5
F.C. Kiryat Yam	16	9	6	8	4	2	2	3	5	6	8	8	9	7	10	7	8	8	7	4	5	4	5	5	5	5	7	7	6	7	8	8	8	6	6	6	6
Hapoel Kfar Saba	1	7	12	7	8	6	8	8	8	7	5	6	3	3	3	3	3	3	3	3	4	6	7	7	9	10	11	8	8	8	7	6	7	8	8	7	7
Hapoel Rishon LeZion	9	2	1	2	3	10	4	6	4	3	4	3	4	4	4	4	5	5	6	7	6	7	4	4	3	3	3	3	3	4	5	5	5	7	7	8	8
Maccabi Jaffa	13	15	14	14	14	14	14	14	14	14	12	10	10	12	12	14	15	13	16	16	14	15	15	13	12	12	8	10	10	10	10	9	9	10	10	9	9
Hapoel Ra'anana	15	8	11	12	12	12	12	13	12	13	14	14	13	11	11	11	11	10	10	11	12	12	10	8	8	9	10	9	9	9	9	10	10	9	9	10	10
Hapoel Afula	14	16	16	15	16	16	16	16	15	15	15	15	15	15	15	12	13	14	14	13	13	13	11	11	10	11	12	12	12	11	11	11	12	12	11	11	11
F.C. Kafr Qasim	5	10	7	4	7	3	5	7	6	5	3	5	6	5	6	5	4	4	4	6	8	8	9	10	11	8	9	11	11	12	12	12	11	11	12	12	12
Ironi Modi'in	2	1	4	3	5	9	10	11	10	9	9	9	7	8	9	10	9	9	9	10	11	11	13	12	14	13	13	13	15	14	13	15	15	13	14	13	13
Hapoel Acre	6	11	8	9	11	11	11	9	9	11	11	12	12	10	8	9	10	11	11	9	9	10	12	14	15	15	14	14	14	15	15	14	13	15	13	14	14
Hapoel Nof HaGalil	12	14	15	16	15	15	15	15	16	16	16	16	16	16	16	16	16	15	15	14	15	16	14	15	13	14	15	15	13	13	14	13	14	14	15	15	15
Hapoel Hadera	4	12	13	13	13	13	13	12	13	10	10	11	11	13	13	13	14	16	13	15	16	14	16	16	16	16	16	16	16	16	16	16	16	16	16	16	16

== Season statistics ==
=== Top scorers ===
Rank	Player	Club	Goals
1	(Israel) Gil Itzhak	Maccabi Jaffa	16
2	(Israel) Guy Sivilia	Hapoel Kfar Shalem	13
2	(Israel) Julio César	Hapoel Kfar Saba	13
2	(Colombia) José Cortés	Maccabi Petah Tikva	13
5	(Ghana) Ebenezer Mamatah	Hapoel Kfar Shalem	11
5	(Israel) Ohad Barzilay	Maccabi Herzliya	11
5	(Israel) Yuval Sasson	Hapoel Ramat Gan Givatayim	11
8	(Israel) Yaniv Mizrahi	Hapoel Afula	10
8	(Israel) Liran Hazan	Maccabi Petah Tikva	10
8	(Israel) Raz Twizer	Hapoel Acre	10

== See also ==
- 2025–26 Israeli Premier League
