= 2019–20 Liga Leumit =

Liga Leumit
- Season: 2019–20
- Champions: Maccabi Petah Tikva
- Promoted: Maccabi Petah Tikva; Bnei Sakhnin
- Relegated: Hapoel Ashkelon

The 2019–20 Liga Leumit was the 21st season as second tier since its re-alignment in 1999 and the 78th season of second-tier football in Israel.

A total of sixteen teams contested in the league, including twelve sides from the 2018–19 season, the two promoted teams from 2018–19 Liga Alef and the two relegated teams from 2018–19 Israeli Premier League.

== Changes from 2018–19 season ==
=== Team changes ===
Hapoel Kfar Saba and Sektzia Nes Tziona were promoted to the 2019–20 Israeli Premier League.

Maccabi Petah Tikva and Bnei Sakhnin were relegated after finishing as the two bottom-placed clubs in the 2018–19 Israeli Premier League.

Hapoel Marmorek, and Hapoel Iksal were directly relegated to Liga Alef after finishing in the previous season in last two league places. They were replaced by the top placed teams from each division of 2018–19 Liga Alef, F.C. Kafr Qasim (from South Division) and Hapoel Umm al-Fahm (from North Division).

== Overview ==
=== Stadia and locations ===
Locations of the 2019–2020 Liga Leumit teams

Club	Home City	Stadium	Capacity
Beitar Tel Aviv Bat Yam	Tel Aviv and Bat Yam	Ness Ziona Stadium^{[A]}	3,500
Bnei Sakhnin	Sakhnin	Doha Stadium	8,500
F.C. Kafr Qasim	Kafr Qasim	Lod Municipal Stadium^{[A]}	3,000
Hapoel Acre	Acre	Acre Municipal Stadium	5,000
Hapoel Afula	Afula	Afula Illit Stadium	3,000
Hapoel Ashkelon	Ashkelon	Sala Stadium	5,250
Hapoel Bnei Lod	Lod	Lod Municipal Stadium	3,000
Hapoel Katamon Jerusalem	Jerusalem	Teddy Stadium	31,733
Hapoel Nof HaGalil	Nof HaGalil	Ilut Stadium	4,932
Hapoel Petah Tikva	Petah Tikva	HaMoshava Stadium	11,500
Hapoel Ramat Gan	Ramat Gan	Ramat Gan Stadium	13,370
Hapoel Ramat HaSharon	Ramat HaSharon	Grundman Stadium	4,300
Hapoel Rishon LeZion	Rishon LeZion	Haberfeld Stadium	6,000
Hapoel Umm al-Fahm	Umm al-Fahm	Afula Illit Stadium^{[A]}	3,000
Maccabi Ahi Nazareth	Nazareth	Ilut Stadium	4,932
Maccabi Petah Tikva	Petah Tikva	HaMoshava Stadium	11,500

^AThe club is playing their home games at a neutral venue because their own ground does not meet league requirements.

== Regular season ==
Pos	Team	Pld	W	D	L	GF	GA	GD	Pts	Qualification or relegation (Note: Teams play each other two times (30 rounds) before the league is split into two groups (the top eight and the bottom eight).)
1	Maccabi Petah Tikva	30	19	7	4	62	28	+34	64	Qualification for the Promotion playoffs
2	Hapoel Rishon LeZion	30	15	9	6	43	29	+14	54	Qualification for the Promotion playoffs
3	Hapoel Katamon Jerusalem	30	14	7	9	37	30	+7	49	Qualification for the Promotion playoffs
4	Bnei Sakhnin	30	13	9	8	46	30	+16	48	Qualification for the Promotion playoffs
5	Hapoel Ramat HaSharon	30	13	7	10	42	43	−1	46	Qualification for the Promotion playoffs
6	Hapoel Ramat Gan	30	12	8	10	37	29	+8	44	Qualification for the Promotion playoffs
7	F.C. Kafr Qasim	30	12	8	10	41	40	+1	44	Qualification for the Promotion playoffs
8	Beitar Tel Aviv Bat Yam	30	12	7	11	40	40	0	43	Qualification for the Promotion playoffs
9	Hapoel Umm al-Fahm	30	10	9	11	35	38	−3	39	Qualification for the Relegation playoffs
10	Hapoel Petah Tikva	30	9	11	10	42	43	−1	38	Qualification for the Relegation playoffs
11	Hapoel Nof HaGalil	30	9	10	11	36	37	−1	37	Qualification for the Relegation playoffs
12	Hapoel Acre	30	8	10	12	24	27	−3	34	Qualification for the Relegation playoffs
13	Maccabi Ahi Nazareth	30	7	10	13	31	42	−11	31	Qualification for the Relegation playoffs
14	Hapoel Bnei Lod	30	7	5	18	26	59	−33	26	Qualification for the Relegation playoffs
15	Hapoel Ashkelon (Note: Hapoel Ashkelon were deducted nine points for entering administration.)	30	9	6	15	31	38	−7	24	Qualification for the Relegation playoffs
16	Hapoel Afula	30	4	11	15	21	41	−20	23	Qualification for the Relegation playoffs

Source: https://www.scorespro.com/soccer/israel/liga-leumit/standings/
Rules for classification: 1) points; 2) goal difference; 3) number of wins; 4) goals scored; 5) head to head; 6) deciding match.

== Promotion playoffs ==
Pos	Team	Pld	W	D	L	GF	GA	GD	Pts	Qualification or relegation (Note: Teams play each other two times (30 rounds) before the league is split into two groups (the top eight and the bottom eight).)
1	Maccabi Petah Tikva (C)	37	21	8	8	66	37	+29	71	Promoted to Israeli Premier League
2	Bnei Sakhnin	37	19	10	8	60	32	+28	67	Promoted to Israeli Premier League
3	Hapoel Ramat Gan	37	17	9	11	51	36	+15	60	
4	Hapoel Katamon Jerusalem	37	16	11	10	42	33	+9	59	
5	Hapoel Rishon LeZion	37	16	10	11	55	42	+13	58	
6	F.C. Kafr Qasim	37	16	8	13	53	48	+5	56	
7	Beitar Tel Aviv Bat Yam	37	15	7	15	51	54	−3	52	
8	Hapoel Ramat HaSharon	37	14	7	16	50	60	−10	49	

Source: Soccerway
Rules for classification: 1) points; 2) goal difference; 3) number of wins; 4) goals scored; 5) head to head; 6) deciding match.
(C) Champions

== Relegation playoffs ==
Pos	Team	Pld	W	D	L	GF	GA	GD	Pts	Qualification or relegation
9	Hapoel Umm al-Fahm	36	13	10	13	45	44	+1	49	
10	Hapoel Petah Tikva	36	12	11	13	52	54	−2	47	
11	Hapoel Nof HaGalil	37	11	12	14	45	48	−3	45	
12	Hapoel Acre	37	10	13	14	30	32	−2	43	
13	Maccabi Ahi Nazareth	37	10	13	14	42	48	−6	43	
14	Hapoel Afula (O)	37	8	12	17	36	54	−18	36	Qualification for the Relegation decider
15	Hapoel Bnei Lod (R)	35	9	6	20	34	69	−35	33	Qualification for the Relegation decider
16	Hapoel Ashkelon (Note: Hapoel Ashkelon were deducted nine points for entering administration.) (R)	37	9	9	19	37	51	−14	27	Relegated to Liga Alef

Updated to match(es) played on 6 July 2020. Source: https://www.soccerway.com/israel/leumit-league-2019-2020/results/
Rules for classification: 1) points; 2) goal difference; 3) number of wins; 4) goals scored; 5) head to head; 6) deciding match.
(O) Play-off winners; (R) Relegated

== Relegation decider ==
28 July 2020
20:00

Hapoel Afula	3–1	Hapoel Bnei Lod
Hazut 38'; Levy 81'; Biton 90+2'	Report	Abu Anza 90+3'

Ramat Gan Stadium, Ramat Gan

== Promotion/relegation playoff ==
The winner of the Relegation decider game, Hapoel Afula, faced Liga Alef promotion play-offs winner Hapoel Marmorek . The match took place on 2 August 2020.

2 August 2020
20:00

Hapoel Afula	2–0	Hapoel Marmorek
Shawat 64', 73'	Report

Ramat Gan Stadium, Ramat Gan

== See also ==
- 2019–20 Toto Cup Leumit
