= 2018–19 Israeli Premier League =

Israeli Premier League
- Season: 2018–19
- Dates: 25 August 2018 – 25 May 2019
- Champions: Maccabi Tel Aviv
- Relegated: Maccabi Petah Tikva; Bnei Sakhnin
- Champions League: Maccabi Tel Aviv
- Europa League: Maccabi Haifa; Hapoel Be'er Sheva; Bnei Yehuda Tel Aviv
- Matches: 240
- Goals: 599 (2.5 per match)
- Top goalscorer: (Israel) Ben Sahar (15 goals)
- Biggest home win: Hapoel Tel Aviv 6–0 Maccabi Petah Tikva (3 March 2019)
- Biggest away win: Beitar Jerusalem 1–5 Bnei Yehuda (27 October 2018); Bnei Sakhnin 0–4 Hapoel Haifa (19 January 2019); Hapoel Hadera 0–4 Bnei Yehuda (10 February 2019)
- Highest scoring: Hapoel Haifa 4–4 Hapoel Be'er Sheva (4 December 2018)
- Longest winning run: 7 matches Maccabi Tel Aviv
- Longest unbeaten run: 32 matches Maccabi Tel Aviv
- Longest winless run: 13 matches Hapoel Tel Aviv
- Longest losing run: 4 matches Maccabi Petah Tikva; Hapoel Hadera
- Highest attendance: 29,988; Maccabi Haifa 1–3 Hapoel Haifa (1 December 2018)
- Total attendance: 1,430,652
- Average attendance: 5,925

The 2018–19 Israeli Premier League, also known as Ligat Japanika for sponsorship reasons, was the twentieth season since its introduction in 1999 and the 77th season of top-tier football in Israel. The season began on 25 August 2018 and concluded on 25 May 2019. Hapoel Be'er Sheva were the defending champions.

== Teams ==
A total of fourteen teams were competing in the league, including twelve sides from the 2017–18 season and two promoted teams from the 2017–18 Liga Leumit.

Hapoel Acre and Hapoel Ashkelon were relegated to the 2018–19 Liga Leumit after finishing the 2017–18 Israeli Premier League in the bottom two places.

Hapoel Tel Aviv were promoted as the winners of the 2017–18 Liga Leumit. This ends the team's one-year absence from the top division.

Hapoel Hadera were promoted as the Runner-ups of the 2017–18 Liga Leumit. This marked the return of Hadera to the top division after 39 years of absence.

=== Stadiums and locations ===
Locations of the 2018–19 Israeli Premier League teams

Team	Location	Stadium	Capacity
Beitar Jerusalem	Jerusalem	Teddy Stadium	31,733
Bnei Sakhnin	Sakhnin	Doha Stadium	8,500
Bnei Yehuda	Tel Aviv	HaMoshava Stadium, Petah Tikva	11,500
F.C. Ashdod	Ashdod	Yud-Alef Stadium	7,800
Hapoel Be'er Sheva	Be'er Sheva	Turner Stadium	16,126
Hapoel Hadera	Hadera	Netanya Stadium, Netanya	13,610
Hapoel Haifa	Haifa	Sammy Ofer Stadium	30,950
Hapoel Ra'anana	Ra'anana	Ramat Gan Stadium, Ramat Gan	13,370
Hapoel Tel Aviv	Tel Aviv	HaMoshava Stadium, Petah Tikva	11,500
Ironi Kiryat Shmona	Kiryat Shmona	Kiryat Shmona Stadium	5,300
Maccabi Haifa	Haifa	Sammy Ofer Stadium	30,950
Maccabi Netanya	Netanya	Netanya Stadium	13,610
Maccabi Petah Tikva	Petah Tikva	HaMoshava Stadium	11,500
Maccabi Tel Aviv	Tel Aviv	Netanya Stadium, Netanya	13,610

HaMoshava Stadium	Netanya Stadium	Sammy Ofer Stadium
Bnei Yehuda; Hapoel Tel Aviv; Maccabi Petah Tikva	Hapoel Hadera; Maccabi Netanya; Maccabi Tel Aviv	Hapoel Haifa; Maccabi Haifa
Doha Stadium	Kiryat Shmona Stadium	Ramat Gan Stadium
Bnei Sakhnin	Ironi Kiryat Shmona	Hapoel Ra'anana
Teddy Stadium	Turner Stadium	Yud-Alef Stadium
Beitar Jerusalem	Hapoel Be'er Sheva	F.C. Ashdod

=== Personnel and sponsorship ===
Team	President	Manager	Captain	Kitmaker	Shirt sponsor
Beitar Jerusalem	(Israel) Moshe Hogeg	(Israel) Nir Klinger	(Israel) Idan Vered	Givova	Appli Check
Bnei Sakhnin	(Israel) Mohammed Abu Yunes	(Israel) Amir Turgeman	(Israel) Khaled Khalaila	Joma	Scania
Bnei Yehuda	(Israel) Barak Abramov	(Israel) Yossi Abukasis	(Israel) Itzik Azuz	Kappa	HAP
F.C. Ashdod	(Israel) Jacky Ben-Zaken	(Israel) Avi Bohbot	(Israel) Tom Ben Zaken	Nike	——
Hapoel Be'er Sheva	(Israel) Alona Barkat	(Israel) Barak Bakhar	(Israel) Maor Melikson	Puma	Tadiran
Hapoel Haifa	(Israel) Yoav Katz	(Israel) Haim Silvas	(Israel) Gil Vermouth	Joma	BOGART
Hapoel Hadera	(Israel) Oren Golan	(Israel) Niso Avitan	(Israel) Menashe Zalka	Lotto	——
Ironi Kiryat Shmona	(Israel) Izzy Sheratzky	(Israel) Shimon Hadri	(Israel) Eden Shamir	Kappa	Ituran
Hapoel Ra'anana	(Israel) Asher Alon	(Israel) Meni Koretski	(Israel) Snir Shuker	Givova	ME Tel Aviv
Hapoel Tel Aviv	(Israel) Itzik and Sharon Nisanov	(Israel) Kobi Refua	(Israel) Orel Dgani	Macron	Arkia
Maccabi Haifa	(Israel) Ya'akov Shahar	(Israel) Marco Balbul	(Israel) Neta Lavi	Nike	Volvo
Maccabi Netanya	(Israel) Eyal Segal	(Israel) Slobodan Drapić	(Israel) Dani Amos	Lotto	Kesrei Thofa
Maccabi Petah Tikva	(Israel) Amos Luzon	(Israel) Murad Magomedov	(Israel) Naor Peser	Macron	Panorama North
Maccabi Tel Aviv	(Canada) Mitchell Goldhar	(Serbia) Vladimir Ivić	(Israel) Sheran Yeini	——	PenguinPickUp

=== Foreign players ===
The number of foreign players were restricted to six per team, while only five could have been registered to a game.

Club	Player 1	Player 2	Player 3	Player 4	Player 5	Player 6
Beitar Jerusalem	(France) Antoine Conte	(France) Ange-Freddy Plumain	(Ghana) Anthony Annan	(Portugal) Afonso Taira	(Romania) Mihai Voduț	
Bnei Sakhnin	(Kosovo) **Alban Pnishi**	(Nigeria) George Akpabio	(Nigeria) Shuaibu Ibrahim	(Zambia) Emmanuel Mbola		
Bnei Yehuda	(Ivory Coast) Ismaila Soro	(Lithuania) **Emilijus Zubas**	(Republic of the Congo) Mavis Tchibota	(Serbia) Fejsal Mulić	(Slovakia) **Jakub Sylvestr**	(Spain) Carlos Cuéllar
F.C. Ashdod	(Burkina Faso) Issoumaila Lingane	(France) Romain Habran	(France) Johan Martial	(Ghana) Leonard Owusu	(Niger) Seybou Koita	(Serbia) Filip Knežević
Hapoel Be'er Sheva	(France) Kevin Tapoko	(Netherlands) Nigel Hasselbaink	(Nigeria) **John Ogu**	(Portugal) Miguel Vítor	(Slovakia) **Erik Sabo**	
Hapoel Haifa	(Lithuania) **Ernestas Šetkus**	(Moldova) **Radu Gînsari**	(North Macedonia) Risto Mitrevski	(Romania) **Gabriel Tamaș**	(Sweden) Rasmus Sjöstedt	
Hapoel Hadera	(Brazil) Lúcio	(England) Nathan Oduwa	(Nigeria) **Austin Ejide**	(Spain) David Mateos	(United States) George Fochive	
Ironi Kiryat Shmona	(Albania) Valon Ahmedi	(Brazil) Marcus Diniz	(Guinea) Hadji Barry	(Lithuania) **Džiugas Bartkus**	(Spain) Jorge Morcillo	(Trinidad and Tobago) Levi García
Hapoel Ra'anana	(Cameroon) Ariel Ngueukam	(Croatia) Mirko Oremuš	(Czech Republic) Martin Zeman	(France) Teddy Mézague	(Ghana) Eugene Ansah	
Hapoel Tel Aviv	(Belgium) Marvin Peersman	(Brazil) Caio Alves	(Brazil) Claudemir	(Ghana) Emmanuel Boateng	(Lithuania) Nerijus Valskis	
Maccabi Haifa	(Brazil) Allyson	(Cameroon) **Ernest Mabouka**	(Cameroon) **Georges Mandjeck**	(Chile) **Manuel Iturra**	(Netherlands) Etiënne Reijnen	(Turkey) Kerim Frei
Maccabi Netanya	(Albania) Jahmir Hyka	(Croatia) Branko Vrgoč	(Germany) Tim Heubach	(Montenegro) **Fatos Bećiraj**	(Niger) Ali Mohamed	
Maccabi Petah Tikva	(Czech Republic) Tomáš Sivok	(France) Franck-Yves Bambock	(Ivory Coast) Kpehi Didier Brossou	(Panama) **Armando Cooper**	(Senegal) Issa Cissokho	(Ukraine) Anton Bratkov
Maccabi Tel Aviv	(Nigeria) Chikeluba Ofoedu	(Spain) Jair Amador	(Serbia) Uroš Nikolić	(Serbia) **Predrag Rajković**	(Spain) Enric Saborit	

In bold: Players that have been capped for their national team.

=== Managerial changes ===
Team	Outgoing manager	Manner of departure	Date of vacancy	Position in table	Incoming manager	Date of appointment
Beitar Jerusalem	Benny Ben Zaken		1 June 2018	Pre-season	Guy Luzon	
Bnei Sakhnin	Tal Banin		1 June 2018	Pre-season	Benny Ben Zaken	
F.C. Ashdod	Yossi Mizrahi		1 June 2018	Pre-season	(North Macedonia) Blagoja Milevski	
Maccabi Petah Tikva	Sharon Mimer		1 June 2018	Pre-season	Elisha Levy	
Maccabi Tel Aviv	(Netherlands) Jordi Cruyff	Left	1 June 2018	Pre-season	(Serbia) Vladimir Ivić	1 June 2018
Beitar Jerusalem	Guy Luzon	Sacked	22 October 2018	13th	Nir Klinger	30 October 2018
Hapoel Haifa	Nir Klinger	Left	25 October 2018	11th	Sharon Mimer	31 October 2018
Maccabi Haifa	(Netherlands) Fred Rutten	Left	1 November 2018	8th	Eli Guttman	8 November 2018
Bnei Sakhnin	Benny Ben Zaken	Sacked	5 November 2018	14th	Amir Turgeman	18 November 2018
F.C. Ashdod	(North Macedonia) Blagoja Milevski	Sacked	13 November 2018	13th	Yuval Naim	23 November 2018
Hapoel Tel Aviv	Kobi Refua	Sacked	25 November 2018	12th	Ofir Haim	26 November 2018
Maccabi Haifa	Eli Guttman	Retired	3 December 2018	11th	Itay Mordechai (caretaker)	3 December 2018
Maccabi Haifa	Itay Mordechai (caretaker)	Caretaking spell over	19 December 2018	10th	Marco Balbul	19 December 2018
Ironi Kiryat Shmona	Haim Silvas	Sacked	30 December 2018	10th	Tomer Kashtan	30 December 2018
Hapoel Tel Aviv	Ofir Haim	Sacked	6 January 2019	12th	Kobi Refua	6 January 2019
Maccabi Petah Tikva	Elisha Levy	Sacked	6 January 2019	9th	(Russia) Murad Magomedov (caretaker)	6 January 2019
Maccabi Petah Tikva	(Russia) Murad Magomedov (caretaker)	Caretaking spell over	20 January 2019	9th	Guy Luzon	20 January 2019
Bnei Sakhnin	Benny Ben Zaken	Sacked	20 January 2019	13th	(Georgia (country)) Giorgi Daraselia	23 January 2019
F.C. Ashdod	Yuval Naim	Sacked	26 January 2019	14th	Avi Bohbot	19 February 2019
Bnei Sakhnin	(Georgia (country)) Giorgi Daraselia	Sacked	5 March 2019	14th	(Spain) Juan Carlos (caretaker)	5 March 2019
Bnei Sakhnin	(Spain) Juan Carlos (caretaker)	Caretaking spell over	26 March 2019	14th	(Israel) Eldad Shavit	26 March 2019
Hapoel Haifa	Sharon Mimer	Sacked	14 April 2019	10th	Haim Silvas	17 April 2019
Ironi Kiryat Shmona	Tomer Kashtan	Sacked	6 May 2019	12th	Shimon Hadri	6 May 2019

== Regular season ==
=== Regular season table ===
Pos	Team	Pld	W	D	L	GF	GA	GD	Pts	Qualification or relegation
1	Maccabi Tel Aviv	26	20	6	0	57	12	+45	66	Qualification for the Championship round
2	Maccabi Haifa	26	12	8	6	34	27	+7	44	Qualification for the Championship round
3	Maccabi Netanya	26	12	7	7	34	29	+5	43	Qualification for the Championship round
4	Hapoel Be'er Sheva	26	10	9	7	36	32	+4	39	Qualification for the Championship round
5	Bnei Yehuda	26	10	7	9	39	25	+14	37	Qualification for the Championship round
6	Hapoel Hadera	26	9	6	11	30	41	−11	33	Qualification for the Championship round
7	Hapoel Haifa	26	7	11	8	42	37	+5	32	Qualification for the Relegation round
8	Hapoel Tel Aviv	26	6	13	7	26	23	+3	31	Qualification for the Relegation round
9	Ironi Kiryat Shmona	26	7	9	10	25	28	−3	30	Qualification for the Relegation round
10	Hapoel Ra'anana	26	6	12	8	20	30	−10	30	Qualification for the Relegation round
11	Beitar Jerusalem	26	7	8	11	32	37	−5	29	Qualification for the Relegation round
12	Maccabi Petah Tikva	26	6	10	10	26	40	−14	28	Qualification for the Relegation round
13	F.C. Ashdod	26	5	7	14	20	42	−22	22	Qualification for the Relegation round
14	Bnei Sakhnin	26	4	9	13	21	39	−18	21	Qualification for the Relegation round

Source: Soccerway
Rules for classification: 1) Points; 2) Goal difference; 3) Matches won; 4) Goals scored; 5) Head-to-head points; 6) Head-to-head goal difference; 7) Head-to-head goals scored; 8) Play-off.

=== Regular season results ===
Home \ Away	BEI	BnS	BnY	ASH	HAH	HBS	HHA	HRA	HTA	MNE	IKS	MHA	MPT	MTA
Beitar Jerusalem	—	3–2	1–5	4–1	0–1	2–3	1–1	2–0	0–1	1–1	0–0	1–1	0–0	0–2
Bnei Sakhnin	0–0	—	2–1	4–3	1–2	0–0	0–4	0–0	1–1	0–2	0–3	0–2	0–1	0–0
Bnei Yehuda	0–2	0–1	—	2–0	2–0	3–1	4–2	3–0	0–0	0–0	0–1	1–1	2–2	1–3
F.C. Ashdod	1–1	2–1	1–0	—	2–3	1–0	0–3	1–1	1–1	1–4	1–0	0–1	1–1	0–2
Hapoel Hadera	0–3	2–1	0–4	3–2	—	1–2	2–0	0–0	2–1	2–2	1–0	1–2	3–0	0–2
Hapoel Be'er Sheva	3–1	1–1	0–0	1–0	2–2	—	2–0	2–0	2–1	1–1	2–1	0–2	4–1	1–1
Hapoel Haifa	2–2	0–3	0–2	0–1	1–1	4–4	—	2–2	1–1	5–0	1–1	0–0	4–2	1–3
Hapoel Ra'anana	2–1	2–1	0–0	1–1	1–0	3–1	0–3	—	0–0	1–2	2–1	1–1	1–0	0–2
Hapoel Tel Aviv	0–3	2–0	3–2	0–0	1–1	1–0	1–0	0–0	—	1–2	0–0	1–2	6–0	1–1
Maccabi Netanya	3–1	1–1	1–3	1–0	1–0	1–0	1–2	1–0	1–1	—	1–0	0–0	0–1	1–2
Ironi Kiryat Shmona	2–0	2–2	0–2	0–0	3–1	1–1	1–1	1–1	1–0	1–0	—	2–3	0–2	1–2
Maccabi Haifa	1–2	2–0	1–0	2–0	3–1	0–0	1–3	0–0	3–2	0–2	2–2	—	1–2	1–3
Maccabi Petah Tikva	4–1	0–0	1–1	2–0	1–1	1–3	1–1	1–1	0–0	1–4	0–1	1–2	—	1–1
Maccabi Tel Aviv	1–0	3–0	2–1	4–0	4–0	3–0	1–1	4–1	0–0	4–1	3–0	2–0	2–0	—

Source: Israel Football Association
Legend: Blue = home team win; Yellow = draw; Red = away team win.

=== Positions by round ===
Team ╲ Round	1	2	3	4	5	6	7	8	9	10	11	12	13	14	15	16	17	18	19	20	21	22	23	24	25	26
Maccabi Tel Aviv	3	3	1	1	2	2	1	1	1	1	1	1	1	1	1	1	1	1	1	1	1	1	1	1	1	1
Maccabi Haifa	12	6	6	9	9	10	12	8	9	8	11	7	9	10	7	6	5	4	3	3	2	3	3	3	3	2
Maccabi Netanya	14	13	14	14	12	13	10	7	6	7	7	8	5	6	5	5	6	5	7	5	6	4	4	2	2	3
Hapoel Be'er Sheva	6	9	12	13	11	7	4	5	5	4	4	4	4	3	3	3	4	7	6	7	7	7	5	5	4	4
Bnei Yehuda	11	11	11	12	6	3	3	3	3	2	3	2	2	2	2	2	2	2	2	2	4	2	2	4	5	5
Hapoel Hadera	4	1	2	2	1	1	2	2	2	3	2	3	3	4	4	4	3	3	4	6	3	5	6	6	6	6
Hapoel Haifa	1	5	5	8	8	12	11	13	8	11	10	10	6	5	6	7	7	6	5	4	5	6	7	7	7	7
Hapoel Tel Aviv	10	7	7	6	7	8	8	11	12	12	13	13	14	14	13	12	12	12	11	11	12	12	11	11	11	8
Ironi Kiryat Shmona	7	12	8	5	4	5	6	4	4	5	5	5	7	9	10	10	8	8	8	8	8	8	8	9	8	9
Hapoel Ra'anana	8	4	9	7	10	11	13	10	10	10	9	9	11	8	9	9	9	9	9	9	10	10	10	10	10	10
Beitar Jerusalem	13	14	13	10	13	14	14	14	13	14	14	14	13	12	11	11	11	10	10	10	9	9	9	8	9	11
Maccabi Petah Tikva	2	2	4	3	3	4	5	6	7	6	6	6	8	7	8	8	10	11	12	12	11	11	12	12	12	12
F.C. Ashdod	5	8	3	4	5	6	7	9	11	13	12	12	12	13	14	14	14	14	14	14	14	13	13	13	13	13
Bnei Sakhnin	9	10	10	11	14	9	9	12	14	9	8	11	10	11	12	13	13	13	13	13	13	14	14	14	14	14

== Championship round ==
Key numbers for pairing determination (number marks position after 26 games)

Rounds
27th	28th	29th	30th	31st	32nd	33rd	34th	35th	36th
1 – 6; 2 – 5; 3 – 4	1 – 2; 5 – 3; 6 – 4	2 – 6; 3 – 1; 4 – 5	1 – 4; 2 – 3; 6 – 5	3 – 6; 4 – 2; 5 – 1	6 – 1; 5 – 2; 4 – 3	2 – 1; 3 – 5; 4 – 6	6 – 2; 1 – 3; 5 – 4	3 – 2; 4 – 1; 5 – 6	6 – 3; 2 – 4; 1 – 5

Due to 3 teams that play in the Netanya stadium qualifying to this round, and in order to insure that all the last games of this round, can be played in the same time(for purity reasons), the order of the games, has been changed. Affecting fixtures 33,35 and 36.

Rounds
33rd	34th	35th	36th
6 – 3; 2 – 4; 1 – 5	6 – 2; 1 – 3; 5 – 4	2 – 1; 3 – 5; 4 – 6	3 – 2; 4 – 1; 5 – 6

=== Championship round table ===
Pos	Team	Pld	W	D	L	GF	GA	GD	Pts	Qualification
1	Maccabi Tel Aviv (C)	36	27	8	1	77	17	+60	89	Qualification for the Champions League second qualifying round
2	Maccabi Haifa	36	16	10	10	46	41	+5	58	Qualification for the Europa League first qualifying round
3	Hapoel Be'er Sheva	36	15	10	11	48	46	+2	55	Qualification for the Europa League first qualifying round
4	Maccabi Netanya	36	15	8	13	45	47	−2	53	
5	Bnei Yehuda Tel Aviv	36	14	9	13	56	41	+15	51	Qualification for the Europa League third qualifying round (Note: Bnei Yehuda Tel Aviv qualified for the Europa League third qualifying round by winning the 2018–19 Israel State Cup.)
6	Hapoel Hadera	36	12	6	18	43	59	−16	42	

Source: Israel Football Association, Soccerway
Rules for classification: 1) Points; 2) Goal difference; 3) Matches won; 4) Goals scored; 5) Head-to-head points; 6) Head-to-head goal difference; 7) Head-to-head goals scored; 8) Play-off.
(C) Champions
Notes:

2018–19 Israeli Premier League champions

Maccabi Tel Aviv
22nd title

=== Championship round results ===
Home \ Away	BnY	HAH	HBS	MHA	MNE	MTA
Bnei Yehuda	—	1–2	2–3	2–2	1–1	0–2
Hapoel Hadera	2–3	—	1–4	2–0	1–2	0–1
Hapoel Be'er Sheva	2–1	1–0	—	0–1	0–2	0–4
Maccabi Haifa	0–2	1–3	3–1	—	2–1	1–1
Maccabi Netanya	0–2	3–2	0–1	1–2	—	1–4
Maccabi Tel Aviv	2–3	2–0	0–0	1–0	3–0	—

Source: Israel Football Association
Legend: Blue = home team win; Yellow = draw; Red = away team win.
For upcoming matches, an "a" indicates there is an article about the rivalry between the two participants.

=== Positions by round ===
Team ╲ Round	26	27	28	29	30	31	32	33	34	35	36
Maccabi Tel Aviv	1	1	1	1	1	1	1	1	1	1	1
Maccabi Haifa	3	2	4	3	3	3	2	2	2	3	2
Hapoel Be'er Sheva	2	4	2	2	2	3	4	4	4	2	3
Maccabi Netanya	4	3	3	4	5	4	3	3	3	4	4
Bnei Yehuda	5	5	5	5	4	5	5	5	5	5	5
Hapoel Hadera	6	6	6	6	6	6	6	6	6	6	6

2018–19 UEFA Champions League First qualifying round
2018–19 UEFA Europa League First qualifying round

== Relegation round ==
Key numbers for pairing determination (number marks position after 26 games)

Rounds
27th	28th	29th	30th	31st	32nd	33rd
7 – 11; 8 – 13; 9 – 12; 10 – 14	11 - 14; 12 - 10; 13 - 9; 7 - 8	8 - 11; 9 - 7; 10 – 13; 14 - 12	11 - 12; 13 - 14; 7 - 10; 8 - 9	9 - 11; 10 - 8; 14 - 7; 12 - 13	11 - 13; 7 - 12; 8 - 14; 9 -10	10 - 11; 14 - 9; 12 - 8; 13 - 7

=== Relegation round table ===
Pos	Team	Pld	W	D	L	GF	GA	GD	Pts	Relegation
7	Beitar Jerusalem	33	11	10	12	43	43	0	43	
8	Hapoel Tel Aviv	33	9	15	9	40	30	+10	42	
9	Hapoel Ra'anana	33	8	15	10	29	38	−9	39	
10	Ironi Kiryat Shmona	33	9	11	13	34	35	−1	38	
11	Hapoel Haifa	33	8	13	12	44	47	−3	37	
12	F.C. Ashdod	33	10	7	16	34	54	−20	37	
13	Maccabi Petah Tikva (R)	33	8	12	13	33	51	−18	36	Relegation to Liga Leumit
14	Bnei Sakhnin (R)	33	5	12	16	27	50	−23	27	Relegation to Liga Leumit

Source: Soccerway
Rules for classification: 1) Points; 2) Goal difference; 3) Matches won; 4) Goals scored; 5) Head-to-head points; 6) Head-to-head goal difference; 7) Head-to-head goals scored; 8) Play-off.
(R) Relegated

=== Relegation round results ===
Home \ Away	BEI	BnS	ASH	HHA	HRA	HTA	IKS	MPT
Beitar Jerusalem	—	0–0	2–3	—	—	—	—	4–1
Bnei Sakhnin	—	—	—	1–2	—	—	0–2	1–1
F.C. Ashdod	—	1–2	—	1–0	—	—	3–2	—
Hapoel Haifa	0–0	—	—	—	0–2	0–0	—	0–3
Hapoel Ra'anana	1–2	2–2	1–2	—	—	2–1	—	—
Hapoel Tel Aviv	1–2	3–0	5–1	—	—	—	2–2	—
Ironi Kiryat Shmona	0–1	—	—	3–0	0–0	—	—	0–1
Maccabi Petah Tikva	—	—	0–3	—	1–1	0–2	—	—

Source: Israel Football Association
Legend: Blue = home team win; Yellow = draw; Red = away team win.
For upcoming matches, an "a" indicates there is an article about the rivalry between the two participants.

=== Positions by round ===
Team ╲ Round	26	27	28	29	30	31	32	33
Beitar Jerusalem	11	12	11	9	7	7	7	7
Hapoel Tel Aviv	8	7	7	7	8	10	8	8
Hapoel Ra'anana	10	9	9	12	9	8	9	9
Ironi Kiryat Shmona	9	11	12	10	11	11	12	10
Hapoel Haifa	7	8	8	8	10	9	10	11
F.C. Ashdod	13	14	13	13	13	13	13	12
Maccabi Petah Tikva	12	10	10	11	12	12	11	13
Bnei Sakhnin	14	13	14	14	14	14	14	14

Relegation to 2019–20 Liga Leumit

== Season statistics ==
=== Top scorers ===
Rank	Scorer	Club	Goals
1	(Israel) Ben Sahar	Hapoel Be'er Sheva	15
2	(Montenegro) Fatos Bećiraj	Maccabi Netanya	13
2	(Brazil) Lúcio	Hapoel Hadera	13
4	(Israel) Yarden Shua	Bnei Yehuda / Maccabi Haifa	12
4	(Israel) Eliran Atar	Maccabi Tel Aviv	12
6	(Republic of the Congo) Mavis Tchibota	Bnei Yehuda	11
6	(Israel) Omer Atzili	Maccabi Tel Aviv	11
8	(Israel) Guy Melamed	Hapoel Be'er Sheva / Maccabi Netanya	10
9	(Australia) (Israel) Nikita Rukavytsya	Maccabi Haifa	9
9	(France) Ange-Freddy Plumain	Hapoel Hadera / Beitar Jerusalem	9
9	(Israel) Shlomi Azulay	Bnei Sakhnin	9
12	6 different players	3 different teams	8

Source: (Hebrew)

=== Hat-tricks ===
Player	For	Against	Result	Date	Round	Reference
(Israel) Matan Hozez	Hapoel Haifa	Bnei Sakhnin	4–0	19 January 2019	19	

== Attendances ==
No.	Club	Average attendance	Change	Highest
1	Maccabi Haifa	15,671	-7,3%	29,988
2	Hapoel Be'er-Sheva	13,590	-6,1%	15,800
3	Beitar Jerusalem	10,789	-13,6%	20,000
4	Maccabi Tel Aviv	9,781	-2,7%	12,551
5	Hapoel Tel Aviv	6,209	-	8,549
6	Maccabi Netanya	5,622	-17,3%	9,130
7	Hapoel Haifa	5,369	-21,8%	25,100
8	Bnei Yehuda Tel Aviv	3,226	-10,4%	8,000
9	Hapoel Hadera-Giv'at Olga	2,851	-	6,436
10	Maccabi Petah Tikva	2,634	2,3%	9,500
11	Ashdod	1,755	-13,9%	5,090
12	Bnei Sakhnin	1,750	9,1%	4,447
13	Hapoel Ra'anana	1,528	-10,7%	4,600
14	Hapoel Ironi Kiryat Shmona	1,430	16,6%	4,230

== See also ==
- 2018–19 Liga Leumit
- 2018-19 Ligat Nashim
