= 2024–25 Liga Leumit =

Liga Leumit
- Season: 2024–25
- Dates: August 2024 – 22 May 2025
- Champions: Hapoel Tel Aviv
- Promoted: Hapoel Tel Aviv; Hapoel Petah Tikva
- Relegated: Hapoel Afula; Hapoel Umm al-Fahm
- Matches: 592
- Goals: 773 (1.31 per match)
- Top goalscorer: Stav Turiel; Ben Hadadi (16 goals)
- All statistics correct as of 14 February 2025.

The 2024–25 Liga Leumit is the 26th season as second tier since its realignment in 1999 and the 83rd season of second-tier football in Israel.

== Teams ==
A total of sixteen teams are contesting in the league, including twelve sides from the 2023–24 season, the two promoted teams from Liga Alef and the two relegated teams from 2023–24 Israeli Premier League.

=== Team changes ===
The following teams have changed division since the 2023–24 season.

==== To Liga Leumit ====
===== Promoted from Liga Alef =====
- Hapoel Kfar Shalem (South Division)
- Hapoel Ra'anana (North Division)

===== Relegated from Premier League =====
- Hapoel Tel Aviv
- Hapoel Petah Tikva

==== From Liga Leumit ====
===== Promoted to Premier League =====
- Ironi Kiryat Shmona
- Ironi Tiberias

===== Relegated to Liga Alef =====
- Sektzia Ness Ziona
- Ihud Bnei Shefa-'Amr

=== Stadia and locations ===
Club	Home City	Stadium	Capacity
Bnei Yehuda Tel Aviv	Tel Aviv	Bloomfield Stadium	29,400
F.C. Kafr Qasim	Kafr Qasim	Bat Yam Municipal Stadium (Note: Play their home games at a neutral venue because their own ground does not meet league requirements.)	3,100
Hapoel Acre	Acre	Acre Municipal Stadium	5,000
Hapoel Afula	Afula	Afula Illit Stadium	3,000
Hapoel Kfar Saba	Kfar Saba	Levita Stadium	5,800
Hapoel Kfar Shalem	Tel Aviv	Ramat Gan Stadium	13,370
Hapoel Nof HaGalil	Nof HaGalil	Green Stadium	5,200
Hapoel Petah Tikva	Petah Tikva	HaMoshava Stadium	11,500
Hapoel Ra'anana	Ra'anana	Levita Stadium	5,800
Hapoel Ramat Gan	Ramat Gan	Ramat Gan Stadium	13,370
Hapoel Ramat HaSharon	Ramat HaSharon	Grundman Stadium	4,300
Hapoel Rishon LeZion	Rishon LeZion	Haberfeld Stadium	6,000
Hapoel Tel Aviv	Tel Aviv	Bloomfield Stadium	29,400
Hapoel Umm al-Fahm	Umm al-Fahm	HaShalom Stadium	5,800
Maccabi Jaffa	Tel Aviv	Ness Ziona Stadium	3,500
Maccabi Herzliya	Herzliya	Grundman Stadium (Note: Play their home games at a neutral venue because their own ground Hertzliya Municipal Stadium is under renovations.)	4,300

== Regular season ==
=== League table ===
Pos	Team	Pld	W	D	L	GF	GA	GD	Pts	Advances
1	Hapoel Tel Aviv	30	22	6	2	65	22	+43	72	Advances to the Promotion Round
2	Hapoel Petah Tikva	30	22	5	3	52	19	+33	71	Advances to the Promotion Round
3	Hapoel Kfar Shalem	30	18	5	7	62	38	+24	59	Advances to the Promotion Round
4	Hapoel Ramat Gan	30	17	5	8	58	29	+29	56	Advances to the Promotion Round
5	Bnei Yehuda	30	13	5	12	37	36	+1	44	Advances to the Promotion Round
6	Maccabi Herzliya	30	12	6	12	37	51	−14	42	Advances to the Promotion Round
7	Hapoel Kfar Saba	30	10	10	10	37	37	0	40	Advances to the Promotion Round
8	Hapoel Rishon LeZion	30	12	4	14	41	43	−2	40	Advances to the Promotion Round
9	F.C. Kafr Qasim	30	10	9	11	28	26	+2	39	Advances to the Relegation Round
10	Hapoel Acre	30	12	3	15	29	42	−13	39	Advances to the Relegation Round
11	Hapoel Ra'anana	30	9	10	11	34	37	−3	37	Advances to the Relegation Round
12	Hapoel Ramat HaSharon	30	11	4	15	48	60	−12	37	Advances to the Relegation Round
13	Maccabi Jaffa	30	6	11	13	33	46	−13	29	Advances to the Relegation Round
14	Hapoel Nof HaGalil	30	6	5	19	30	49	−19	23	Advances to the Relegation Round
15	Hapoel Afula	30	3	12	15	25	52	−27	21	Advances to the Relegation Round
16	Hapoel Umm al-Fahm	30	4	6	20	21	50	−29	18	Advances to the Relegation Round

Source: Soccerway
Rules for classification: 1) points; 2) goal difference; 3) number of wins; 4) goals scored; 5) head to head; 6) deciding match.

=== Results ===
Home \ Away	HTA	HPT	HKH	HRG	MHE	HRS	BNY	HKS	FKQ	HRL	HAC	HRA	HNG	MJA	HAF	HUF
Hapoel Tel Aviv	—	2–2	3–0	7 Feb	3–0	4–2	2–1	3–0	0–1	3–0		1–1	27 Jan	3–1		4–0
Hapoel Petah Tikva		—		1–1	1–0	3–2	4–1	31 Jan	1–0		3–0		2–3	0–0	10 Feb	2–1
Hapoel Kfar Shalem	31 Jan	2–0	—	0–2	2–1	1–3	2–1	2–1	3–0		10 Feb	3–1	4–3	4–1		1–0
Hapoel Ramat Gan	1–3	1–2	0–6	—	6–0		2–0	2–0	3–0	0–0	2–0			2–1	27 Jan	
Maccabi Herzliya	0–3	24 Jan	2–1		—	2–1	3–2	1–0	1–0	2–5		1–0	2–1	1–1	2–2	2–2
Hapoel Ramat HaSharon	1–2	0–1	3–4	0–4	31 Jan	—	0–2	2–2	1–0	4–1	3–1	4–0		7 Feb	3–1	
Bnei Yehuda				1–3	3–1	3–0	—	1–1	1–1	1–0			0–2	1–0	31 Jan	2–0
Hapoel Kfar Saba	2–2	2–3	2–2	2–2		2–0	1–1	—		24 Jan	0–2	2–2	2–0	2–1	2–0	2–0
F.C. Kafr Qasim	1–2	0–2	1–1			2–0	0–1	0–1	—	1–1	4–0	24 Jan	2–0		0–0	1–1
Hapoel Rishon LeZion	2–1	0–2	1–4	0–1	2–0		10 Feb	1–2		—	0–1	2–0		31 Jan	2–0	
Hapoel Acre	0–1	0–1	0–1	0–0	0–2	27 Jan	1–3		1–0	1–2	—	31 Jan	2–0	2–1	2–1	
Hapoel Ra'anana	0–1	1–1		0–1	1–2		0–1	7 Feb	1–2		2–1	—	2–2	1–1		2–1
Hapoel Nof HaGalil	3–4		1–3	1–2	7 Feb	1–4		0–1	31 Jan	3–2	1–2	0–0	—		1–1	2–1
Maccabi Jaffa		0–3		3–0	1–1	2–4	24 Jan	4 Feb	1–1	2–0		0–0	0–3	—	2–2	3–1
Hapoel Afula	1–1	0–2	1–3	0–4			2–2	1–1		0–1	1–1	0–4		2–2	—	
Hapoel Umm al-Fahm	1–1	0–1	24 Jan	31 Jan	2–1	0–3		2–1	7 Feb	0–1	1–2	2–3	0–1	0–0	0–0	—

Updated to match(es) played on 7 March 2025. Source: Soccerway
Legend: Blue = home team win; Yellow = draw; Red = away team win.

== Promotion playoffs ==
Pos	Team	Pld	W	D	L	GF	GA	GD	Pts	Qualification or relegation	HTA	HPT	HRG	HKH	MHE	BNY	HKS	HRL
1	Hapoel Tel Aviv (C, P)	37	27	7	3	78	25	+53	88	Promoted to Israeli Premier League		0–0	1–0		4–0	3–0		
2	Hapoel Petah Tikva (P)	37	27	7	3	64	20	+44	88	Promoted to Israeli Premier League				5–0		1–0	1–0	1–1
3	Hapoel Ramat Gan	37	22	5	10	71	35	+36	71			0–1				3–2	4–2	2–0
4	Hapoel Kfar Shalem	37	19	6	12	65	53	+12	63		2–0		0–2		0–2	0–4		
5	Maccabi Herzliya	37	15	6	16	46	64	−18	51			0–3	0–2				2–0	
6	Bnei Yehuda	37	15	5	17	49	51	−2	50						3–2		1–2	2–4
7	Hapoel Kfar Saba	37	12	11	14	43	49	−6	47		0–3			1–0				1–1
8	Hapoel Rishon LeZion	37	13	7	17	50	55	−5	46		1–2			1–1	1–3			

Source: Soccerway
Legend: Blue = home team win; Yellow = draw; Red = away team win.
Rules for classification: 1) points; 2) goal difference; 3) number of wins; 4) goals scored; 5) head to head; 6) deciding match.
(C) Champions; (P) Promoted

== Relegation playoffs ==
Pos	Team	Pld	W	D	L	GF	GA	GD	Pts	Qualification or relegation	HAC	FKQ	HRS	HRA	MJA	HNG	HAF	HUF
9	Hapoel Acre	37	17	4	16	42	49	−7	55					2–0	0–0		2–1	3–2
10	F.C. Kafr Qasim	37	13	11	13	35	33	+2	50		2–1		0–3		1–1	2–0		
11	Hapoel Ramat HaSharon (R)	37	14	6	17	62	71	−9	48	Administrative relegation	1–2				4–3		0–0	3–3
12	Hapoel Ra'anana	37	10	13	14	40	45	−5	43			1–1	1–3		1–2	0–0		
13	Maccabi Jaffa	37	9	14	14	44	53	−9	41							1–1	2–0	2–0
14	Hapoel Nof HaGalil (O)	37	8	8	21	36	56	−20	32	Qualification for the Promotion/relegation playoff	1–3		2–0				2–1	
15	Hapoel Afula	37	4	14	19	30	61	−31	26			0–1		0–0				3–2
16	Hapoel Umm al-Fahm (R)	37	5	8	24	29	64	−35	23	Relegated to Liga Alef		1–0		0–3		0–0		

Source: Soccerway
Legend: Blue = home team win; Yellow = draw; Red = away team win.
Rules for classification: 1) points; 2) goal difference; 3) number of wins; 4) goals scored; 5) head to head; 6) deciding match.
(O) Play-off winners; (R) Relegated

== Promotion/relegation playoff ==
The 14th-placed team faced Liga Alef promotion play-offs winner in a one game.

22 May 2025
19:00

Hapoel Nof HaGalil	5-2	Agudat Sport Nordia Jerusalem
Schwartz 17' (o.g.); Shedo 41', 69'; Berkman 84'; Shalev 86'		21' Asanka; 24' Schwartz

Ramat Gan Stadium, Ramat Gan

== See also ==
- 2024–25 Israeli Premier League
