= 2017–18 Liga Leumit =

Liga Leumit
- Season: 2017–18
- Champions: Hapoel Tel Aviv
- Promoted: Hapoel Tel Aviv; Hapoel Hadera
- Relegated: Maccabi Herzliya; Ironi Nesher
- Matches: 221
- Goals: 685 (3.1 per match)
- Top goalscorer: Guy Dayan and Roy Zikri (13)
- Biggest home win: 4-0 (6 times); 5-1 (twice); See Below
- Biggest away win: 5-0 (3 times); See Below
- Highest scoring: 7 goals (4 times)

The 2017–18 Liga Leumit was the 19th season as second tier since its re-alignment in 1999 and the 76th season of second-tier football in Israel.

A total of sixteen teams were contesting in the league, including twelve sides from the 2016–17 season, the two promoted teams from 2016–17 Liga Alef and the two relegated teams from 2016–17 Israeli Premier League.

== Changes from 2016–17 season ==
=== Team changes ===
Maccabi Netanya and Hapoel Acre, were promoted to the 2017–18 Israeli Premier League.

Hapoel Tel Aviv and Hapoel Kfar Saba were relegated after finishing as the two bottom-placed clubs in the 2016–17 Israeli Premier League.

Maccabi Sha'arayim, and Hapoel Jerusalem were directly relegated to Liga Alef after finishing in the previous season in last two league places. They were replaced the top placed teams from each division of 2016–17 Liga Alef, Hapoel Marmorek (from South Division) and Hapoel Hadera (from North Division).

== Overview ==
=== Stadia and locations ===
| Club | Home City | Stadium | Capacity |
|---|---|---|---|
| Beitar Tel Aviv Ramla | Tel Aviv and Ramla | Ramla Municipal Stadium | 2,000 |
| Hapoel Afula | Afula | Afula Illit Stadium | 3,000 |
| Hapoel Bnei Lod | Lod | Lod Municipal Stadium | 3,000 |
| Hapoel Hadera | Hadera | Afula Illit Stadium^{[A]} | 3,000 |
| Hapoel Katamon Jerusalem | Jerusalem | Teddy Stadium | 31,733 |
| Hapoel Kfar Saba | Kfar Saba | Levita Stadium | 5,800 |
| Hapoel Marmorek | Rehovot | Ramla Municipal Stadium^{[A]} | 2,000 |
| Hapoel Nazareth Illit | Nazareth Illit | Green Stadium | 4,000 |
| Hapoel Petah Tikva | Petah Tikva | HaMoshava Stadium | 11,500 |
| Hapoel Ramat Gan | Ramat Gan | Ramat Gan Stadium | 13,370 |
| Hapoel Ramat HaSharon | Ramat HaSharon | Grundman Stadium | 4,300 |
| Hapoel Rishon LeZion | Rishon LeZion | Haberfeld Stadium | 6,000 |
| Hapoel Tel Aviv | Tel Aviv | HaMoshava Stadium | 11,500 |
| Ironi Nesher | Nesher | Nesher Stadium | 2,500 |
| Maccabi Ahi Nazareth | Nazareth | Ilut Stadium | 4,932 |
| Maccabi Herzliya | Herzliya | Herzliya Municipal Stadium | 8,100 |

^A The club is playing their home games at a neutral venue because their own ground does not meet league requirements.

== Regular season ==
=== Regular season table ===
| Pos | Team | Pld | W | D | L | GF | GA | GD | Pts | Qualification |
|---|---|---|---|---|---|---|---|---|---|---|
| 1 | Hapoel Tel Aviv | 30 | 20 | 5 | 5 | 46 | 17 | +29 | 65 | Qualification for the Promotion playoffs |
| 2 | Hapoel Hadera | 30 | 15 | 8 | 7 | 45 | 36 | +9 | 53 | Qualification for the Promotion playoffs |
| 3 | Hapoel Katamon Jerusalem | 30 | 13 | 9 | 8 | 35 | 27 | +8 | 48 | Qualification for the Promotion playoffs |
| 4 | Hapoel Rishon LeZion | 30 | 13 | 9 | 8 | 30 | 30 | 0 | 48 | Qualification for the Promotion playoffs |
| 5 | Maccabi Ahi Nazareth | 30 | 13 | 7 | 10 | 30 | 26 | +4 | 46 | Qualification for the Promotion playoffs |
| 6 | Hapoel Nazareth Illit | 30 | 13 | 6 | 11 | 41 | 32 | +9 | 45 | Qualification for the Promotion playoffs |
| 7 | Beitar Tel Aviv Ramla | 30 | 12 | 8 | 10 | 40 | 38 | +2 | 44 | Qualification for the Promotion playoffs |
| 8 | Hapoel Afula | 30 | 10 | 12 | 8 | 33 | 28 | +5 | 42 | Qualification for the Promotion playoffs |
| 9 | Hapoel Bnei Lod | 30 | 11 | 9 | 10 | 32 | 28 | +4 | 42 | Qualification for the Relegation playoffs |
| 10 | Hapoel Kfar Saba | 30 | 12 | 5 | 13 | 41 | 39 | +2 | 41 | Qualification for the Relegation playoffs |
| 11 | Hapoel Ramat HaSharon | 30 | 12 | 4 | 14 | 30 | 30 | 0 | 40 | Qualification for the Relegation playoffs |
| 12 | Hapoel Marmorek | 30 | 11 | 5 | 14 | 33 | 37 | −4 | 38 | Qualification for the Relegation playoffs |
| 13 | Hapoel Petah Tikva | 30 | 9 | 10 | 11 | 31 | 34 | −3 | 37 | Qualification for the Relegation playoffs |
| 14 | Hapoel Ramat Gan | 30 | 8 | 11 | 11 | 29 | 28 | +1 | 35 | Qualification for the Relegation playoffs |
| 15 | Maccabi Herzliya | 30 | 6 | 7 | 17 | 28 | 55 | −27 | 25 | Qualification for the Relegation playoffs |
| 16 | Ironi Nesher | 30 | 2 | 5 | 23 | 16 | 55 | −39 | 11 | Qualification for the Relegation playoffs |

Source: Liga Leumit IFA
Rules for classification: 1) points; 2) goal difference; 3) number of wins; 4) goals scored; 5) head to head; 6) deciding match.

==== Results ====
| Home \ Away | TAR | HAF | HBL | HHD | HKJ | HKS | HMR | HNI | HPT | HRG | HRS | HRL | HTA | INE | MAN | MHZ |
|---|---|---|---|---|---|---|---|---|---|---|---|---|---|---|---|---|
| Beitar Tel Aviv Ramla | — | 2–1 | 2–2 | 1–1 | 0–2 | 3–4 | 3–1 | 2–0 | 0–2 | 2–0 | 2–1 | 1–2 | 0–2 | 3–0 | 2–0 | 1–3 |
| Hapoel Afula | 1–1 | — | 1–2 | 0–2 | 3–0 | 0–1 | 0–0 | 2–2 | 1–1 | 1–0 | 1–2 | 1–0 | 2–3 | 2–0 | 0–2 | 1–1 |
| Hapoel Bnei Lod | 0–1 | 1–1 | — | 0–2 | 1–1 | 2–2 | 0–2 | 0–0 | 1–0 | 2–0 | 1–0 | 0–0 | 0–1 | 2–0 | 1–1 | 3–1 |
| Hapoel Hadera | 1–0 | 1–1 | 0–1 | — | 0–3 | 1–0 | 0–3 (Note: Hapoel Hadera fielded an ineligible player and the match was given to Hapoel Marmorek. The original score was 2–3 to Marmorek.) | 2–4 | 3–1 | 2–1 | 1–3 | 1–1 | 2–2 | 4–3 | 0–3 (Note: Hapoel Hadera fielded an ineligible player and the match was given to Maccabi Ahi Nazareth. The original score was 1–1.) | 3–0 |
| Hapoel Katamon Jerusalem | 1–1 | 0–0 | 1–0 | 0–1 | — | 2–1 | 2–1 | 1–0 | 1–1 | 0–1 | 2–1 | 1–0 | 0–2 | 3–2 | 0–1 | 1–3 |
| Hapoel Kfar Saba | 2–3 | 0–3 | 2–0 | 0–2 | 1–4 | — | 1–0 | 3–0 | 4–0 | 0–0 | 0–1 | 0–1 | 0–1 | 3–0 | 4–0 | 4–0 |
| Hapoel Marmorek | 2–3 | 0–0 | 1–2 | 0–1 | 1–3 | 2–0 | — | 1–2 | 2–1 | 0–1 | 1–0 | 0–3 | 0–0 | 1–0 | 1–0 | 2–1 |
| Hapoel Nazareth Illit | 0–1 | 2–2 | 2–0 | 3–1 | 0–0 | 3–0 | 0–1 | — | 1–0 | 3–2 | 0–1 | 1–2 | 0–1 | 1–1 | 3–0 | 5–1 |
| Hapoel Petah Tikva | 1–1 | 1–2 | 0–2 | 2–2 | 1–0 | 0–1 | 3–0 | 0–0 | — | 0–0 | 1–0 | 0–1 | 1–2 | 2–0 | 1–1 | 2–1 |
| Hapoel Ramat Gan | 2–0 | 1–1 | 1–1 | 1–1 | 2–2 | 0–2 | 0–0 | 1–0 | 1–1 | — | 1–1 | 0–1 | 1–1 | 4–0 | 0–1 | 3–0 |
| Hapoel Ramat HaSharon | 0–1 | 2–0 | 1–0 | 0–4 | 0–0 | 4–1 | 4–1 | 1–0 | 1–2 | 0–0 | — | 0–1 | 1–2 | 1–0 | 2–1 | 0–1 |
| Hapoel Rishon LeZion | 1–1 | 0–0 | 2–1 | 2–4 | 0–0 | 1–1 | 0–5 | 0–1 | 3–1 | 3–2 | 1–0 | — | 0–3 | 2–1 | 0–0 | 0–0 |
| Hapoel Tel Aviv | 2–0 | 0–1 | 1–0 | 0–0 | 1–1 | 4–0 | 1–0 | 4–1 | 0–1 | 2–0 | 3–1 | 0–1 | — | 3–0 | 0–2 | 2–0 |
| Ironi Nesher | 2–2 | 1–2 | 0–3 | 0–0 | 0–1 | 1–3 | 0–2 | 0–1 | 2–2 | 0–2 | 0–1 | 1–0 | 2–1 | — | 0–1 | 0–1 |
| Maccabi Ahi Nazareth | 0–0 | 0–1 | 0–0 | 0–1 | 2–1 | 0–0 | 4–1 | 0–3 | 1–1 | 1–0 | 2–1 | 2–0 | 0–1 | 2–0 | — | 2–0 |
| Maccabi Herzliya | 2–1 | 0–2 | 2–4 | 1–2 | 0–2 | 1–1 | 2–2 | 2–3 | 1–3 | 0–2 | 0–0 | 2–2 | 0–1 | 0–0 | 2–1 | — |

Source: Liga Leumit IFA
Legend: Blue = home team win; Red = away team win.

== Playoffs ==
=== Top Playoff ===
Key numbers for pairing determination (number marks position after 30 games)

Rounds
| 31st | 32nd | 33rd | 34th | 35th | 36th | 37th |
| 1 – 5; 2 – 7; 3 – 6; 4 – 8 | 1 – 2; 7 – 3; 6 – 4; 5 – 8 | 3 – 1; 2 – 5; 4 – 7; 8 – 6 | 1 – 4; 2 – 3; 5 – 6; 7 – 8 | 8 – 1; 4 – 2; 3 – 5; 6 – 7 | 1 – 6; 2 – 8; 3 – 4; 5 – 7 | 7 – 1; 6 – 2; 8 – 3; 4 – 5 |

==== Top Playoff table ====
| Pos | Team | Pld | W | D | L | GF | GA | GD | Pts | Promotion |
|---|---|---|---|---|---|---|---|---|---|---|
| 1 | Hapoel Tel Aviv (P) | 37 | 23 | 7 | 7 | 59 | 26 | +33 | 76 | Promoted to Israeli Premier League |
| 2 | Hapoel Hadera (P) | 37 | 18 | 11 | 8 | 50 | 39 | +11 | 65 | Promoted to Israeli Premier League |
| 3 | Hapoel Rishon LeZion | 37 | 18 | 10 | 9 | 38 | 34 | +4 | 64 | |
| 4 | Beitar Tel Aviv Ramla | 37 | 17 | 9 | 11 | 56 | 43 | +13 | 60 | |
| 5 | Hapoel Katamon Jerusalem | 37 | 15 | 10 | 12 | 42 | 37 | +5 | 55 | |
| 6 | Maccabi Ahi Nazareth | 37 | 15 | 8 | 14 | 35 | 39 | −4 | 53 | |
| 7 | Hapoel Nazareth Illit | 37 | 14 | 7 | 16 | 48 | 43 | +5 | 49 | |
| 8 | Hapoel Afula | 37 | 12 | 12 | 13 | 39 | 40 | −1 | 48 | |

Rules for classification: 1) points; 2) goal difference; 3) number of wins; 4) goals scored; 5) head to head; 6)deciding match.
(P) Promoted

==== Top Playoff results ====
| Home \ Away | TAR | HAF | HHD | HKJ | HNI | HRL | HTA | MAN |
|---|---|---|---|---|---|---|---|---|
| Beitar Tel Aviv Ramla | — | 5–1 | — | 3–0 | — | — | 2–0 | — |
| Hapoel Afula | — | — | — | 0–2 | 0–1 | — | 0–3 | — |
| Hapoel Hadera | 1–1 | 1–0 | — | 1–0 | — | — | — | 0–0 |
| Hapoel Katamon Jerusalem | — | — | — | — | 1–1 | 0–1 | 2–1 | 1–2 |
| Hapoel Nazareth Illit | 1–2 | — | 0–1 | — | — | 1–2 | — | — |
| Hapoel Rishon LeZion | 1–0 | 0–2 | 1–0 | — | — | — | — | 3–1 |
| Hapoel Tel Aviv | — | — | 1–1 | — | 4–3 | 0–0 | — | 3–0 |
| Maccabi Ahi Nazareth | 1–3 | 0–3 | — | — | 1–0 | — | — | — |

Legend: Blue = home team win; Yellow = draw; Red = away team win.

=== Bottom Playoff ===
Key numbers for pairing determination (number marks position after 30 games)

Rounds
| 31st | 32nd | 33rd | 34th | 35th | 36th | 37th |
| 9 – 13; 10 – 15; 11 – 14; 12 – 16 | 9 – 10; 15 – 11; 14 – 12; 13 – 16 | 11 – 9; 10 – 13; 12 – 15; 16 – 14 | 9 – 12; 10 – 11; 13 – 14; 15 – 16 | 16 – 9; 12 – 10; 11 – 13; 14 – 15 | 9 – 14; 10 – 16; 11 – 12; 13 – 15 | 15 – 9; 14 – 10; 16 – 11; 12 – 13 |

==== Bottom Playoff table ====
| Pos | Team | Pld | W | D | L | GF | GA | GD | Pts | Relegation |
|---|---|---|---|---|---|---|---|---|---|---|
| 9 | Hapoel Petah Tikva | 37 | 15 | 10 | 12 | 45 | 39 | +6 | 55 | |
| 10 | Hapoel Bnei Lod | 37 | 15 | 9 | 13 | 44 | 40 | +4 | 54 | |
| 11 | Hapoel Ramat HaSharon | 37 | 15 | 5 | 17 | 39 | 39 | 0 | 50 | |
| 12 | Hapoel Marmorek | 37 | 14 | 6 | 17 | 39 | 41 | −2 | 48 | |
| 13 | Hapoel Ramat Gan | 37 | 12 | 11 | 14 | 40 | 36 | +4 | 47 | |
| 14 | Hapoel Kfar Saba (O) | 37 | 14 | 5 | 18 | 50 | 49 | +1 | 47 | Qualification for the Relegation Playoffs |
| 15 | Maccabi Herzliya (R) | 37 | 10 | 7 | 20 | 41 | 63 | −22 | 37 | Relegated to Liga Alef |
| 16 | Ironi Nesher (R) | 37 | 3 | 5 | 29 | 20 | 77 | −57 | 14 | Relegated to Liga Alef |

Rules for classification: 1) points; 2) goal difference; 3) number of wins; 4) goals scored; 5) head to head; 6)deciding match.
(O) Play-off winners; (R) Relegated

==== Bottom Playoff results ====
| Home \ Away | HBL | HKS | HMR | HPT | HRG | HRS | INE | MHZ |
|---|---|---|---|---|---|---|---|---|
| Hapoel Bnei Lod | — | 2–1 | 2–0 | 2–0 | 0–2 | — | — | — |
| Hapoel Kfar Saba | — | — | — | 0–2 | — | 0–1 | 3–0 | 0–1 |
| Hapoel Marmorek | — | 4–0 | — | 0–1 | — | — | 0–1 | 1–0 |
| Hapoel Petah Tikva | — | — | — | — | 2–1 | — | 3–0 | 4–2 |
| Hapoel Ramat Gan | — | 0–5 | 0–1 | — | — | — | — | 2–0 |
| Hapoel Ramat HaSharon | 3–1 | — | 0–0 | 0–2 | 0–4 | — | — | — |
| Ironi Nesher | 3–4 | — | — | — | 0–2 | 0–5 | — | — |
| Maccabi Herzliya | 3–1 | — | — | — | — | 2–0 | 5–0 | — |

Legend: Blue = home team win; Yellow = draw; Red = away team win.

== Positions by round ==
The table lists the positions of teams after each week of matches. In order to preserve chronological evolvements, any postponed matches are not included to the round at which they were originally scheduled, but added to the full round they were played immediately afterwards. For example, if a match is scheduled for matchday 13, but then postponed and played between days 16 and 17, it will be added to the standings for day 17.

| Team \ Round | 1 | 2 | 3 | 4 | 5 | 6 | 7 | 8 | 9 | 10 | 11 | 12 | 13 | 14 | 15 | 16 | 17 | 18 | 19 | 20 | 21 | 22 | 23 | 24 | 25 | 26 | 27 | 28 | 29 | 30 | 31 | 32 | 33 | 34 | 35 | 36 | 37 |
|---|---|---|---|---|---|---|---|---|---|---|---|---|---|---|---|---|---|---|---|---|---|---|---|---|---|---|---|---|---|---|---|---|---|---|---|---|---|
| Hapoel Tel Aviv | 1 | 2 | 3 | 1 | 1 | 3 | 3 | 3 | 3 | 3 | 2 | 1 | 1 | 1 | 2 | 2 | 2 | 1 | 1 | 1 | 1 | 1 | 1 | 1 | 1 | 1 | 1 | 1 | 1 | 1 | 1 | 1 | 1 | 1 | 1 | 1 | 1 |
| Hapoel Hadera | 11 | 6 | 11 | 13 | 14 | 11 | 10 | 9 | 9 | 10 | 10 | 8 | 8 | 10 | 9 | 6 | 7 | 8 | 5 | 5 | 7 | 6 | 7 | 6 | 4 | 4 | 2 | 2 | 2 | 2 | 2 | 2 | 2 | 2 | 2 | 2 | 2 |
| Hapoel Rishon LeZion | 16 | 15 | 15 | 10 | 8 | 6 | 4 | 4 | 5 | 4 | 3 | 4 | 5 | 5 | 5 | 5 | 5 | 4 | 4 | 4 | 5 | 4 | 2 | 3 | 2 | 2 | 3 | 3 | 5 | 4 | 4 | 3 | 3 | 3 | 3 | 3 | 3 |
| Beitar Tel Aviv Ramla | 3 | 4 | 6 | 8 | 11 | 8 | 6 | 5 | 4 | 5 | 7 | 6 | 6 | 7 | 7 | 8 | 6 | 6 | 9 | 8 | 6 | 5 | 3 | 4 | 6 | 7 | 8 | 9 | 10 | 7 | 8 | 6 | 7 | 5 | 4 | 4 | 4 |
| Hapoel Katamon Jerusalem | 9 | 9 | 8 | 9 | 5 | 7 | 8 | 6 | 6 | 6 | 5 | 5 | 3 | 3 | 4 | 4 | 3 | 3 | 3 | 3 | 3 | 7 | 6 | 7 | 8 | 6 | 4 | 4 | 3 | 3 | 3 | 4 | 4 | 4 | 6 | 6 | 5 |
| Maccabi Ahi Nazareth | 12 | 7 | 4 | 3 | 3 | 2 | 2 | 2 | 2 | 2 | 4 | 3 | 4 | 4 | 3 | 3 | 4 | 5 | 6 | 6 | 8 | 8 | 8 | 9 | 7 | 9 | 9 | 7 | 4 | 5 | 6 | 8 | 8 | 6 | 5 | 5 | 6 |
| Hapoel Nazareth Illit | 9 | 14 | 10 | 6 | 6 | 9 | 9 | 10 | 10 | 9 | 9 | 9 | 11 | 11 | 12 | 11 | 11 | 11 | 13 | 10 | 9 | 9 | 9 | 8 | 9 | 8 | 5 | 5 | 6 | 6 | 5 | 7 | 5 | 7 | 7 | 7 | 7 |
| Hapoel Afula | 3 | 7 | 12 | 7 | 9 | 10 | 11 | 11 | 12 | 13 | 11 | 11 | 9 | 9 | 10 | 10 | 10 | 9 | 7 | 7 | 4 | 3 | 5 | 5 | 5 | 5 | 7 | 6 | 7 | 8 | 7 | 5 | 6 | 8 | 8 | 8 | 8 |
| Hapoel Petah Tikva | 7 | 12 | 5 | 4 | 4 | 4 | 5 | 7 | 8 | 8 | 8 | 10 | 10 | 8 | 6 | 7 | 9 | 10 | 8 | 9 | 10 | 10 | 10 | 13 | 14 | 12 | 12 | 12 | 12 | 13 | 14 | 12 | 11 | 10 | 10 | 10 | 9 |
| Hapoel Bnei Lod | 3 | 5 | 7 | 11 | 13 | 14 | 14 | 14 | 11 | 14 | 14 | 14 | 13 | 14 | 14 | 13 | 14 | 14 | 14 | 14 | 13 | 14 | 12 | 11 | 11 | 11 | 10 | 10 | 9 | 9 | 9 | 9 | 9 | 9 | 9 | 9 | 10 |
| Hapoel Ramat HaSharon | 2 | 3 | 2 | 5 | 6 | 5 | 7 | 8 | 7 | 7 | 6 | 7 | 7 | 6 | 8 | 9 | 8 | 7 | 10 | 11 | 11 | 12 | 13 | 12 | 13 | 13 | 13 | 14 | 13 | 11 | 11 | 13 | 12 | 11 | 12 | 13 | 11 |
| Hapoel Marmorek | 7 | 9 | 13 | 14 | 10 | 13 | 12 | 12 | 13 | 11 | 12 | 12 | 14 | 13 | 13 | 14 | 13 | 12 | 11 | 12 | 14 | 11 | 11 | 10 | 10 | 10 | 11 | 11 | 11 | 12 | 13 | 11 | 10 | 12 | 11 | 11 | 12 |
| Hapoel Ramat Gan | 12 | 11 | 9 | 12 | 12 | 12 | 13 | 13 | 14 | 12 | 13 | 13 | 12 | 12 | 11 | 12 | 12 | 13 | 12 | 13 | 12 | 13 | 14 | 14 | 12 | 14 | 14 | 13 | 14 | 14 | 12 | 14 | 13 | 13 | 13 | 12 | 13 |
| Hapoel Kfar Saba | 3 | 1 | 1 | 2 | 2 | 1 | 1 | 1 | 1 | 1 | 1 | 2 | 2 | 2 | 1 | 1 | 1 | 2 | 2 | 2 | 2 | 2 | 4 | 2 | 3 | 3 | 6 | 8 | 8 | 10 | 10 | 10 | 14 | 14 | 14 | 14 | 14 |
| Maccabi Herzliya | 12 | 15 | 16 | 16 | 16 | 16 | 16 | 16 | 16 | 16 | 16 | 16 | 16 | 15 | 16 | 15 | 15 | 15 | 15 | 15 | 15 | 15 | 15 | 15 | 15 | 15 | 15 | 15 | 15 | 15 | 15 | 15 | 15 | 15 | 15 | 15 | 15 |
| Ironi Nesher | 12 | 13 | 14 | 15 | 15 | 15 | 15 | 15 | 15 | 15 | 15 | 15 | 15 | 16 | 15 | 16 | 16 | 16 | 16 | 16 | 16 | 16 | 16 | 16 | 16 | 16 | 16 | 16 | 16 | 16 | 16 | 16 | 16 | 16 | 16 | 16 | 16 |

Source: IFA Source:

| Leader and promotion to 2018–19 Israeli Premier League |
| Promotion to 2018–19 Israeli Premier League |
| Qualification to relegation play-offs |
| Relegation to 2018–19 Liga Alef |

== Promotion/relegation playoff ==
The 14th-placed team, Hapoel Kfar Saba, faced 2017–18 Liga Alef promotion play-offs winner Ironi Tiberias in a two-legged tie. The matches took place on 25 and 29 May 2018.

25 May 2018
16:30 UTC+3

| Hapoel Kfar Saba | 4–2 | Ironi Tiberias |
|---|---|---|
| Fadida 56'; Nesikovsky 60', 72'; David 90+1' | Report | 26' Rothstein; 61' Tza'adon |

Levita Stadium
Referee: Or'el Grinfeld

29 May 2018
16:15 UTC+3

| Ironi Tiberias | 1–1 | Hapoel Kfar Saba |
|---|---|---|
| Gabai 40' | Report | 90' Peretz |

Tiberias Municipal Stadium
Referee: Erez Papir

Hapoel Kfar Saba won 5–3 on aggregate and remained in Liga Leumit. Ironi Tiberias remained in Liga Alef.

== See also ==
- 2017–18 Toto Cup Leumit
