= Omer Tchalisher =

Israeli footballer

Omer Tchalisher עומר צלישר
Personal information
- Full name: Omer Tchalisher
- Date of birth: January 22, 1993 (age 33)
- Place of birth: Zikhron Ya'akov, Israel
- Height: 1.81 m (5 ft 11 1/2 in)
- Position: Defensive midfielder

Youth career
- 2005–2007: Maccabi Netanya
- 2007–2012: Beitar Tubruk

Senior career*
Years	Team	Apps	(Gls)
2012–2015	Maccabi Netanya	70	(3)
2015–2016	Hapoel Ramat HaSharon	20	(1)
2016–2017	Ironi Kiryat Shmona	36	(1)
2017–2018	Hapoel Afula	34	(6)
2018–2019	Hapoel Ramat Gan	16	(0)
2019–2020	Hapoel Kfar Saba	13	(0)
2020	Hapoel Petah Tikva	12	(1)
2020	Hapoel Umm al-Fahm	10	(0)

International career
2008–2009	Israel U-16	8	(1)
2009	Israel U-17	13	(0)
2010–2011	Israel U-18	5	(0)
2011–2012	Israel U-19	12	(1)
2013–2015	Israel U-21	5	(0)
- * Club domestic league appearances and goals as of 1 August 2020

Omer Tchalisher (Hebrew: עומר צלישר) is an Israeli footballer.

== Career ==
On July 8, 2012, Tchalisher signed a contract with Maccabi Netanya of the Israeli Premier League. In July 2015, he was released from the club and a month later signed with Hapoel Nir Ramat HaSharon in the Liga Leumit. At the middle of the 2015–16 season he moved to Hapoel Ironi Kiryat Shmona.

== Club career statistics ==
(correct as of 1 August 2020)

Club	Division	Season	League		Cup		League Cup		Europe		Total	
Club	Division	Season	Apps	Goals	Apps	Goals	Apps	Goals	Apps	Goals	Apps	Goals
Maccabi Netanya	Israeli Premier League	2012–13	19	0	1	0	2	0	2	0	24	0
Maccabi Netanya	Liga Leumit	2013–14	31	2	5	0	0	0	0	0	36	2
Maccabi Netanya	Israeli Premier League	2014–15	20	1	0	0	0	0	0	0	20	1
Hapoel Ramat HaSharon	Liga Leumit	2015–16	19	1	0	0	1	0	0	0	20	1
Ironi Kiryat Shmona	Israeli Premier League	2015–16	10	1	0	0	0	0	0	0	10	1
Ironi Kiryat Shmona	Israeli Premier League	2016–17	24	0	4	0	7	0	0	0	35	0
Hapoel Afula	Liga Leumit	2017–18	34	6	1	0	5	2	0	0	40	8
Hapoel Ramat Gan	Liga Leumit	2018–19	16	0	2	0	0	0	0	0	18	0
Hapoel Kfar Saba	Liga Leumit	2018–19	13	0	0	0	0	0	0	0	13	0
Hapoel Petah Tikva	Liga Leumit	2019–20	12	1	0	0	0	0	0	0	12	1
Hapoel Umm al-Fahm	Liga Leumit	2020–21	0	0	0	0	0	0	0	0	0	0
Total Career			198	12	13	0	15	2	2	0	228	14

== Honours ==
- Liga Leumit
  - Winner (1): 2013–14
- Israel State Cup
  - Runner-up (1): 2014
