= Matías Martín =

Argentine footballer

Matias Martin מתיאס מרטין
Personal information
- Full name: Matias Fernando Martin
- Date of birth: 21 March 1989 (age 37)
- Place of birth: Argentina
- Position: Forward

Senior career*
| Years | Team | Apps | (Gls) |
| -2013 | Tiro Federal | 23+ | (7+) |
| 2013/14-2015 | Hapoel Rishon LeZion F.C. | 38 | (10) |
| 2015/2016 | Hapoel Afula F.C. | 17 | (6) |
| 2015/2016 | Hapoel Jerusalem F.C. | 15 | (5) |
| 2016-2017 | Maccabi Ahi Nazareth F.C. | 34 | (7) |
| 2017-2018 | Hapoel Afula F.C. | 29 | (5) |
- * Club domestic league appearances and goals

Matías Martín (Hebrew: מתיאס מרטין; born 21 March 1989 in Argentina) is an Argentinean footballer.
