= Felix Naim =

Israeli football manager (born 1960)

Felix Naim פליקס נעים
Personal information
- Date of birth: 9 May 1960 (age 66)
- Place of birth: Haifa, Israel

Youth career
- HaTzair Haifa

Senior career*
Years	Team	Apps	(Gls)
- Maccabi Neve Sha'anan

Managerial career
- 2006–2008: Hapoel Afula
- 2009: AEL Limassol (assistant manager)
- 2011: Hapoel Asi Gilboa
- 2011–2012: Maccabi Ironi Kiryat Ata
- 2012–2013: Hapoel Haifa (assistant manager)
- 2013–2016: Hapoel Kfar Saba
- 2016: Hapoel Petach Tikva
- 2017: Hapoel Kfar Saba
- 2017: Bnei Sakhnin
- 2019–: Hapoel Afula
- * Club domestic league appearances and goals

Felix Naim (Hebrew: פליקס נעים) is an Israeli football manager and former player who manages Hapoel Afula.

== Career ==
Naim was a handball player who played for Maccabi Kiryat Motzkin and for the Israel U-18 team. He turned into football when he was 18 years old when he started to play for HaTzair Haifa youth team and then moved to play for the senior side of Maccabi Neve Sha'anan, there he played with Eli Guttman. He moved to France there he played a bit in the fifth tier.

From 1997 til 2001 he worked as Guttman's scout, Naim was the one who brought Đovani Roso to play in Israel. Later on Naim stopped working for Guttman and decided to start his career as a manager in clubs from the lower divisions in Israel.

== Honours ==
Hapoel Kfar Saba

- Liga Alef: 2013–14
- Liga Leumit runner-up : 2014–15
