= Benny Ben Zaken =

Israeli footballer

Personal information
- Full name: Benny Ben Zaken
- Date of birth: October 18, 1982 (age 44)
- Place of birth: Kiryat Shmona, Israel
- Height: 1.73 m (5 ft 8 in)
- Position: Defensive midfielder

Team information
- Current team: Bnei Yehuda (youth)

Youth career
- Ironi Kiryat Shmona

Senior career*
Years	Team	Apps	(Gls)
1999–2012	Ironi Kiryat Shmona		
2013	Hapoel Asi Gilboa	8	(2)

Managerial career
- 2013–2015: Ironi Kiryat Shmona (assistant manager)
- 2015: Ironi Kiryat Shmona
- 2015–2016: Ironi Kiryat Shmona (assistant manager)
- 2016: Ironi Kiryat Shmona (youth)
- 2016: Ironi Kiryat Shmona
- 2016–2017: Hapoel Katamon
- 2017: Hapoel Afula
- 2017–2018: Beitar Jerusalem
- 2018: Bnei Sakhnin
- 2019–2020: Hapoel Ramat Gan
- 2020–: Bnei Yehuda (youth)
- * Club domestic league appearances and goals

Benny Ben Zaken (Hebrew: בני בן זקן; born 18 October 1982) is a retired Israeli footballer and currently manager.

== Honours ==
- Israeli Premier League
  - Winner (1): 2011–12
