= Gal Mayo =

Israeli footballer

Personal information
- Full name: Gal Mayo
- Date of birth: July 30, 1991 (age 35)
- Place of birth: Rishon LeZion, Israel
- Position: Centre back

Team information
- Current team: Hapoel Kfar Shalem

Youth career
- Hapoel Tel Aviv

Senior career*
Years	Team	Apps	(Gls)
2008–2012	Hapoel Tel Aviv	0	(0)
2011–2012	→ Sektzia Ness Ziona	8	(0)
2012–2015	Hapoel Rishon LeZion	72	(5)
2014–2015	→ Ironi Kiryat Shmona	0	(0)
2015–2016	Hapoel Petah Tikva	34	(2)
2016–2019	Hapoel Ramat HaSharon	93	(9)
2019–2020	Hapoel Katamon	36	(3)
2020–2022	Hapoel Jerusalem	56	(0)
2022–2023	Bnei Yehuda	13	(0)
2023	Maccabi Petah Tikva	13	(0)
2023–2024	Maccabi Kabilio Jaffa	33	(1)
2024–	Hapoel Kfar Shalem	15	(1)
- * Club domestic league appearances and goals as of 15 June 2025

Gal Mayo (Hebrew: גל מאיו; born July 30, 1991) is an Israeli footballer who plays as a centere-back for Israeli National League club Hapoel Kfar Shalem.
