= Yuval Shawat =

Israeli footballer

Personal information
- Full name: Yuval Shawat
- Date of birth: May 21, 1989 (age 37)
- Place of birth: Afula, Israel
- Position: Midfielder

Youth career
- 2006–2007: Hapoel Nazareth Illit
- 2007–2008: Hapoel Afula

Senior career*
Years	Team	Apps	(Gls)
2008–2011	Hapoel Afula	90	(30)
2011–2012	Maccabi Umm al-Fahm	26	(6)
2012–2013	Hapoel Acre	6	(0)
2013–2018	Hapoel Afula	171	(46)
2018–2019	Hapoel Nazareth Illit	11	(2)
2019–2021	Hapoel Afula	43	(4)
- * Club domestic league appearances and goals

Yuval Shawat (Hebrew: יובל שאווט) is a former Israeli footballer.

He is of a Tunisian-Jewish descent.
