= Levita Stadium =

Football stadium in Kfar Saba, Israel

Coordinates: 32°10′52″N 34°55′37″E

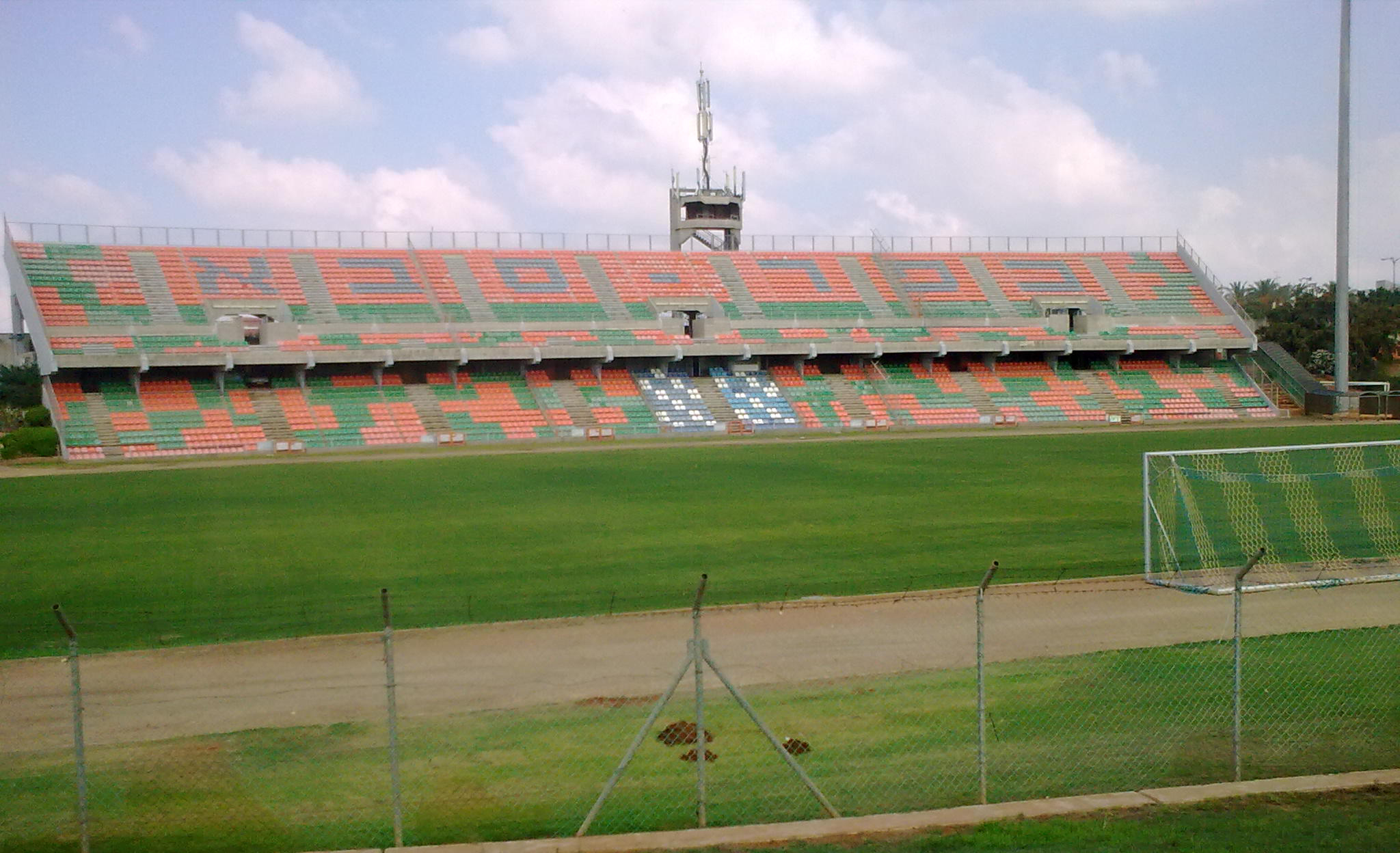
- Interactive map of Levita Stadium
- Capacity: 5,800

Construction
- Groundbreaking: 1972
- Opened: 1986

Tenants
- Beitar Kfar Saba; Hapoel Kfar Saba

The Levita Stadium is a football stadium in Kfar Saba, Israel. It is currently used mostly for football matches and is the home stadium of Hapoel Kfar Saba and Beitar Kfar Saba.

Initial plans for building this stadium were drawn in the late 1960s, and construction began in 1972. However, financial difficulties caused the construction to stop mid-way in 1973 after the Yom Kippur War. The stadium was eventually completed in 1986 and its capacity of 5,800.

== History ==
Plans for the construction of the stadium began in 1966, when Hapoel Kfar Saba played at the *Orchards Ground* (Migrash HaPardesim) on Tchernichovsky Street in the city, near the Meir Medical Center. Several years later, the municipality approved the plan for its construction. The building of the stadium was delayed due to financial difficulties in raising funds for the project. The stadium walls were erected in 1976, and construction of the stands began about three years later. After some time, work was halted for several years due to budgetary constraints, and construction was completed in 1986.

The stadium was inaugurated on 11 October 1986 with a league match between Hapoel Kfar Saba and Hapoel Tel Aviv, which ended in a 0–0 draw. On 26 October the first goal at the stadium was scored by Hapoel Kfar Saba player Meir Nezar, who scored in his team's 2–0 victory over Maccabi Netanya. The attendance record at the stadium was set on 18 April 1987, when 9,000 spectators watched Beitar Jerusalem—which went on to win the 1986–87 Liga Leumit championship—defeat Hapoel Kfar Saba 3–2. About 2,000 of the fans were relocated to an eastern dirt embankment after the western stand became completely full.
