= Afula Illit Stadium =

Football stadium in Afula, Israel

Coordinates: 32°37′38″N 35°19′2″E

Afula Illit Stadium איצטדיון עפולה עילית
- HaSukariya הסוכריה
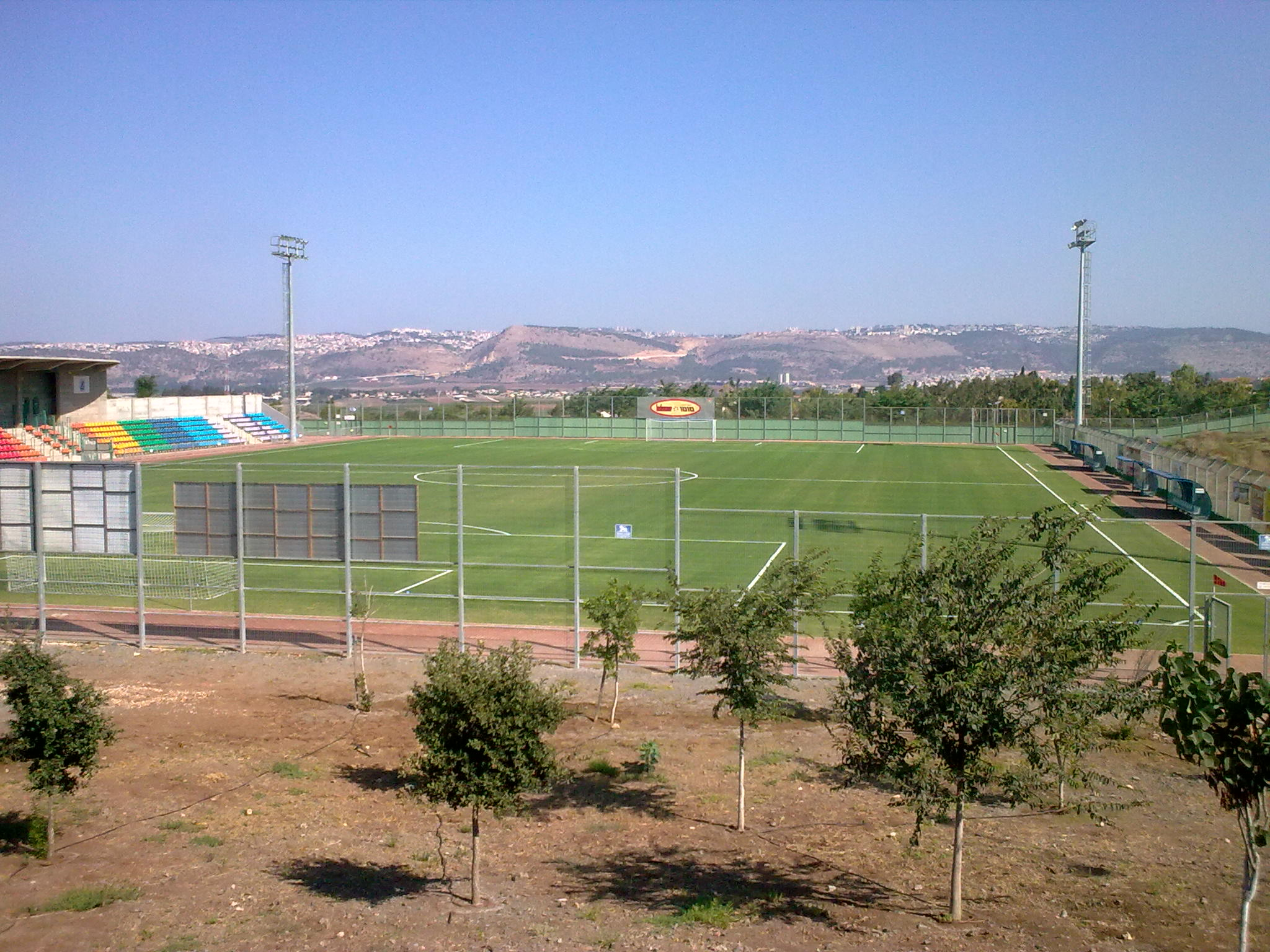
- Interactive map of Afula Illit Stadium איצטדיון עפולה עילית
- Location: Afula, Israel
- Owner: City of Afula
- Operator: City of Afula
- Capacity: 3,000
- Surface: Grass

Construction
- Opened: 2009

Tenants
- Hapoel Afula (2009–); Hapoel Hadera (2016–2018, temporary)

Afula Illit Stadium (Hebrew: איצטדיון עפולה עילית, Itztadion Afula Illit), is a football stadium in Afula, Israel. It is used mostly for football matches and is the home stadium of Hapoel Afula.

== Inauguration of the Stadium ==
The stadium was inaugurated on April 24, 2009 against Maccabi Ironi Kfar Kara. The game, held in front of a full stadium, ended in a 2–2 draw.

During the 2017–18 season the stadium also served as home stadium for Hapoel Hadera, while Hapoel Nazareth Illit also hosted matches in the stadium as a replacement to its own stadium.

In December 2018, during a match between Hapoel Afula and Sektzia Nes Tziona, the stadium was nicknamed "HaSukariya" (The Lollypop) by Sport 5 commentator Shy Nobleman due to its pristine condition.
