= Grundman Stadium =

Stadium in Ramat HaSharon, Israel

Coordinates: 32.130248°N 34.858986°E

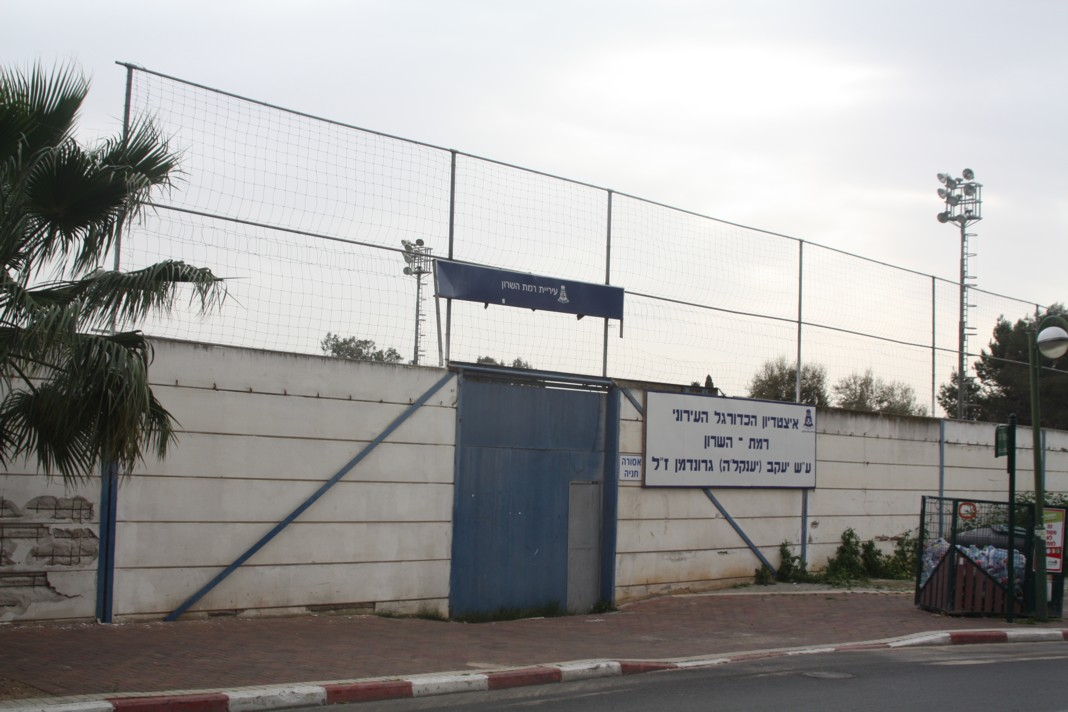
- Interactive map of Grundman Stadium
- Location: Ramat HaSharon, Tel Aviv District, Israel
- Owner: Municipality of Ramat HaSharon
- Operator: Municipality of Ramat HaSharon
- Capacity: 4,300
- Surface: Grass

Construction
- Opened: 1998
- Renovated: 2012

Tenants
- Ironi Nir Ramat HaSharon F.C. Hapoel Morasha Ramat HaSharon F.C.

Grundman Stadium (Hebrew: אצטדיון גרונדמן, Itztadion Grundman) is a football stadium in Tel Aviv District city of Ramat HaSharon, Israel. It is the home stadium of Ironi Nir Ramat HaSharon. The stadium holds 4,300 and was built in 1998 and been renovated in 2012.

The stadium is named after former football player and manager Ya'akov Grundman, who played for Bnei Yehuda and managed Israel.
