= Hapoel Afula F.C. =

Association football club in Israel

Hapoel Afula
- Full name: Hapoel Afula Football Club הפועל עפולה
- Nickname: Afula
- Founded: 1924; 102 years ago (original club); 1951; 75 years ago (reformed club); 1954; 72 years ago (merged club); 2001; 25 years ago (reformed club)
- Ground: Afula Illit Stadium
- Capacity: 3,000
- Chairman: Dani Asulin
- Manager: Erez Benodis
- League: Liga Leumit
- 2025–26: Liga Leumit, 11th of 16
Home colours	Away colours	Third colours

Hapoel Afula is an Israeli football club based in Afula. The club is currently in Liga Leumit and plays at the Afula Illit Stadium. Their main rivals are Hapoel Asi Gilboa.

== History ==
A chart showing the progress of Hapoel Afula through the Israeli football league system, from 1957–58 to the present

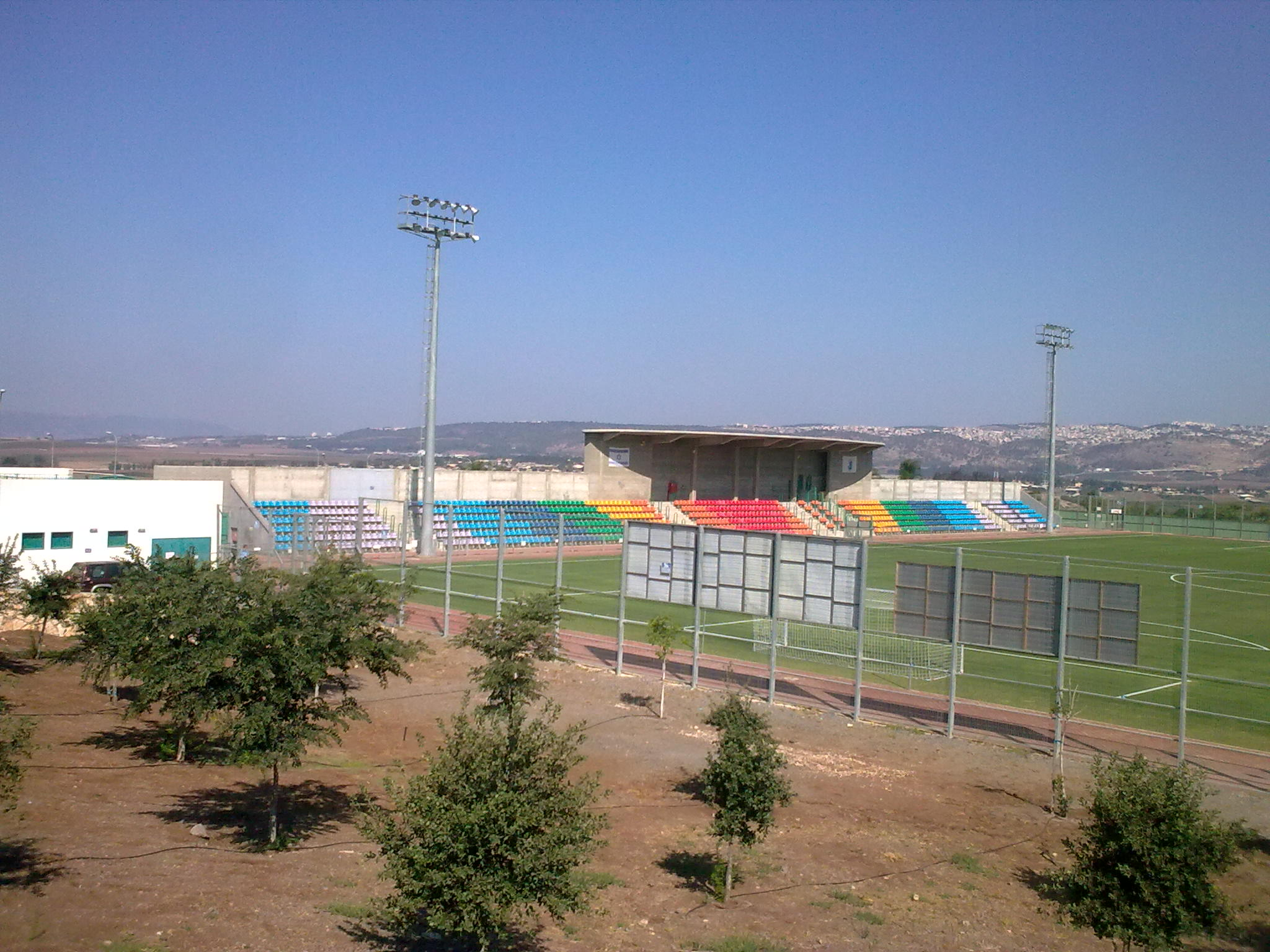
Afula Municipal Stadium

The club was founded in 1924 in Beit Jann, near Yavne'el, by Russian Jews affiliated with Hashomer Hatzair movement. Due to unemployment in Beit Gan, the club relocated to Afula. During its early days, Hapoel Afula played mostly in friendlies against the likes of Hapoel Haifa and in regional leagues, comprising clubs from the Northern and Haifa regions.

After the Israeli Declaration of Independence, the club was re-established in 1951. At the summer of 1954, the club merged with neighboring football club, Hapoel Balfouria, which played at the time at the top flight of Israeli football, and played home matches in Afula.

Since the 1957–58 season, while playing in Liga Alef, the second tier of Israeli football at the time, the club was officially known under its current name, although they were mentioned by the press in both Hapoel Afula and Hapoel Balfouria names. the club continued to play as Hapoel Afula, and the name of Balfouria was dropped. In the 1958–59 season the club finished bottom in Liga Alef, and went to play in the relegation play-offs. In spite the club finished the relegation play-offs in a perfect record against Hapoel Be'er Sheva, Hapoel Netanya and Maccabi Sha'arayim, they were eventually disqualified and demoted to Liga Bet for fielding ineligible player.

The club played for 17 successive seasons in Liga Bet, until they were relegated to Liga Gimel at the end of the 1976–77 season. The club made an immediate return to Liga Bet, where they played up until the 1983–84 season, in which the club folded during the season.

The club reformed in 2001, and reached Liga Bet in the 2002–03 season, where they finished runners-up in the North B division. In the following season, the club won that division and were promoted to Liga Alef. After 9 seasons in Liga Alef, the club finally managed to win promotion to Liga Leumit, when they won the 2012–13 season in Liga Alef North, by a margin of ten points, and made a return to the second tier of Israeli football after 54 years.

In The 2013–14 season, the club reached the top play-off in Liga Leumit, and finished in the 6th place, an achievement which was bettered in the following season, after the club finished in the 4th place.

In the 2014–15 Israel State Cup, the club eliminated top flight club, Maccabi Petah Tikva, in the Quarter-finals by away goals (0–0, 2–2), and reached the Semi-finals for the first time in their history. However, in the Semi-finals, Hapoel Afula were hammered 0–7 by Hapoel Be'er Sheva in Teddy Stadium, Jerusalem.

On 6 December 2017, the club won its first major trophy, after beating Hapoel Ramat Gan in the Toto Cup Leumit final.

== Current squad ==
As of 20 August 2026

No.	Pos.	Nation	Player
1	GK	ISR	Netanel Daloya
4	DF	GHA	Mohammed Adams
6	MF	ISR	Roei Rabinovich
7	MF	ISR	Yaniv Brik
8	MF	ISR	Raz Twizer
9	FW	ISR	Ahmed Khalaila
10	MF	ISR	Eilon Elimelech
11	MF	ISR	Ilay Azar
12	DF	ISR	Shalev Desta
14	MF	ISR	Itay Turgeman
15	MF	ISR	Noam Shemesh
17	MF	NGA	Innocent Kingsley

No.	Pos.	Nation	Player
20	MF	ISR	Snir Talias
21	MF	ISR	Orel Danan
23	MF	ISR	Noam Ben Hemo
26	FW	ISR	Niv Tubul
27	MF	ISR	Eliya Ifrach
30	DF	ISR	Idan Rata
32	DF	ISR	Ben Vehava
47	FW	ISR	Orel Yehuda
55	GK	ISR	Roy Shedo
99	FW	ISR	Yahli Malka

== Honours ==
=== League ===
Honour	No.	Years
Third tier	1	2012–13
Fifth tier	2	1977–78, 2003–04
Sixth tier	1	2001–02

=== Cups ===
Honour	No.	Years
Toto Cup Leumit	1	2017–18

== Managers ==
- (Israel) Tzahi Tayer (2006–07)
- (Israel) Felix Naim (2007)
- (Israel) Dror Cohen (2007)
- (Israel) Baruch Sa'ar (2007)
- (Israel) Erez Benodis (2007)
- (Israel) Felix Naim (2008)
- (Israel) Albert Edri (2008)
- (Israel) Lior Levy (2008–2009)
- (Israel) Alon Schwager (2009–2010)
- (Israel) Oded Koter (2010–11)
- (Israel) Yaron Hochenboim (2011–2015)
- (Israel) Nissan Yehezkel (2015–2016)
- (Israel) Eyal Lahman (2016–2017)
- (Israel) Reuven Atar (2017)
- (Israel) Benny Ben Zaken (2017)
- (Israel) Ofir Haim (2017–2019)
- (Israel) Yigal Antebi (2019)
- (Israel) Idan Bar On (2019)
- (Israel) Shlomi Dora (2019–)
