= 2016–17 Maccabi Haifa F.C. season =

Maccabi Haifa
2016–17 season
- Chairman: Ya'akov Shahar
- Manager: Ronny Levy (until 27 July 2016); Itay Mordechai (interim) (until 15 August 2016); René Meulensteen (until 13 February 2017); Guy Luzon (from 13 February 2017)
- Stadium: Sammy Ofer
- Ligat Ha'Al: 6th
- State Cup: Round of 32
- Toto Cup: Quarter-final
- Europa League: Second qualifying round
- Israel Super Cup: Runners-up
- Top goalscorer: League: Eliran Atar (7); All: Eliran Atar and Gili Vermouth (7)
- Highest home attendance: 29,214 (vs Beitar Jerusalem, 5 December 2016)
- Lowest home attendance: 2,500 (vs Bnei Sakhnin, 6 August 2016)
- Average home league attendance: 21,202 (League); 2,680 (Toto Cup); 9,632 (State Cup)
Home colours	Away colours	Third colours

The 2016–17 season was Maccabi Haifa's 59th season in Israeli Premier League, and their 35th consecutive season in the top division of Israeli football.

== Club ==
=== Kits ===
- Provider: Nike, Inc.
- Main sponsor: Honda
- Secondary sponsor: Pointer and Variety Israel

Home	Away	GK	GK 2

=== Squad information ===
N	Pos.	Nat.	Name	Age	EU	Since	App	Goals	Ends	Transfer fee	Notes
1	GK	(Israel)	Ohad Levita	30	EU	2014/15	33	0	2017	Free	Second nationality: Germany
3	CB	(Israel)	Shay Ben David	19	Non-EU	2015/16	12	0	N/A	Youth system	
4	CB	(Spain)	Marc Valiente	29	EU	2015/16	59	1	2018	€300,000	
5	RB	(Israel)	Eyad Abu Abaid	21	Non-EU	2016/17	17	0	2019	€260,000	
6	CB	(Uruguay)	Gary Kagelmacher (vice captain)	28	EU	2016/17	35	1	2019	Free	Second nationality: Germany
7	LB	(Israel)	Sun Menahem	22	Non-EU	2015/16	40	2	2017	Free	
8	MF	(Kosovo)	Enis Alushi	31	EU	2016/17	8	0	2017	Loan	
9	FW	(Norway)	Fitim Azemi	24	EU	2016/17	6	0	2019	Free	
10	FW	(Israel)	Omer Damari	27	Non-EU	2016/17	5	2	2019	Free	
11	LW	(Israel)	Ismaeel Ryan	22	Non-EU	2011/12	63	3	2017	Youth system	
13	FW	(Australia)	Nikita Rukavytsya	29	EU	2016/17	27	8	2019	€400,000	Israel Resident
14	LW	(Israel)	Gili Vermouth	31	Non-EU	2015/16	43	8	2018	Free	
15	CB	(Iceland)	Hólmar Örn Eyjólfsson	26	EU	2016/17	11	0	2021	€1,000,000	
16	LW	(Israel)	Eliran Atar	29	Non-EU	2014/15	65	25	2018	Free	
19	AM	(Israel)	Roi Kahat	24	Non-EU	2016/17	28	3	2018	Free	
21	CB	(Israel)	Dekel Keinan (captain)	31	Non-EU	2002/03	414	27	2017	€450,000	
22	GK	(Israel)	Gil Ofek	30	Non-EU	2015/16	0	0	2017	Free	
25	CM	(Czech Republic)	Kamil Vacek	29	EU	2016/17	27	0	2018	Free	
28	DM	(Israel)	Yaniv Brik	21	Non-EU	2013/14	11	0	N/A	Youth system	
29	CF	(Israel)	Mohammed Awaed	19	Non-EU	2014/15	14	1	2019	Youth system	
31	DM	(Israel)	Neta Lavi (3rd captain)	19	Non-EU	2015/16	65	0	2019	Youth system	
32	LW	(Israel)	Amit Zenati	19	Non-EU	2016/17	17	0	N/A	Youth system	
34	LB	(Israel)	Yahav Gurfinkel	18	Non-EU	2016/17	3	0	2020	Youth system	
40	CB	(Israel)	Yonathn Levi	18	Non-EU	2015/16	8	0	N/A	Youth system	
55	GK	(Israel)	Omri Glazer	20	Non-EU	2016/17	22	0	2020	Free	

- Last updated: 2 April 2017
- Source: mhaifafc.com, Israel Football Association, UEFA Players transfer,
- Ordered by squad number.

=== Current coaching staff ===
Position	Staff
Sporting Director	(Norway) Tor-Kristian Karlsen
Manager	(Israel) Guy Luzon
Assistant Manager	(England) Mick Priest
Assistant Manager	(Israel) Asaf Nimni
Goalkeeping Coach	(Israel) Giora Antman
Fitness Coach	(Israel) Sholmo Yasiknovki
Fitness Coach	(Israel) Uri Harel
Club Administrator	(Israel) Rafi Osmo
Scout	(Israel) (Brazil) Gustavo Boccoli
Club doctor	(Israel) Dr. Ami Berber
Club doctor	(Israel) Dr. Doron Kopelman
Club doctor	(Israel) Dr. Bezalel Fskin
Physiotherapist	(Israel) Alon Persi
Equipment Manager	(Israel) Ze'ev Ikshin

Last updated: 3 March 2017
Source: F.C. Maccabi Haifa Official Website

== Transfers ==
=== Transfers in ===
No.	Pos.	Nat.	Name	Age	EU	Moving from	Type	Transfer window	Ends	Transfer fee	Source
26	AM	(Israel)	Firas Mugrabi	25	Non-EU	(Israel) Bnei Sakhnin	Transfer	Summer	2018	Free	Maccabi Haifa
13	FW	(Australia)	Nikita Rukavytsya	29	EU	(Israel) Beitar Jerusalem	Transfer	Summer	2019	€400,000	Maccabi Haifa
6	CB	(Uruguay)	Gary Kagelmacher	28	EU	(Germany) 1860 Munich	Transfer	Summer	2019	€250,000	Maccabi Haifa
55	GK	(Israel)	Omri Glazer	20	Non-EU	(Israel) Hapoel Ra'anana	Transfer	Summer	2020	€250,000	Maccabi Haifa
5	RB	(Israel)	Eyad Abu Abaid	21	Non-EU	(Israel) Hapoel Tel Aviv	Transfer	Summer	2018	€260,000	Maccabi Haifa
19	AM	(Israel)	Roi Kahat	24	Non-EU	Austria Wien	Transfer	Summer	2018	€1,000,000	Maccabi Haifa
25	CM	(Czech Republic)	Kamil Vacek	29	EU	(Czech Republic) Sparta Prague	Transfer	Summer	2018	Free	Maccabi Haifa
3	LB	(Croatia)	Mario Musa	26	EU	(Croatia) Dinamo Zagreb	Loan	Summer	2017	Free	Maccabi Haifa
15	CB	(Iceland)	Hólmar Örn Eyjólfsson	26	EU	(Norway) Rosenborg	Transfer	Winter	2020	€1,000,000	Maccabi Haifa
10	FW	(Israel)	Omer Damari	27	Non-EU	(Germany) RB Leipzig	Loan	Winter	2019	Free	Maccabi Haifa
9	FW	(Norway)	Fitim Azemi	24	EU	(Norway) FK Bodø/Glimt	Transfer	Winter	2019	Free	Maccabi Haifa
8	DM	(Kosovo)	Enis Alushi	30	EU	(Germany) 1. FC Nürnberg	Loan	Winter	2017	Free	Maccabi Haifa

Total spending: ▼3,160,000 €

=== Transfers out ===
No.	Pos.	Nat.	Name	Age	EU	Moving to	Type	Transfer window	Transfer fee	Source
6	CM	(Israel)	Ran Abukarat	27	Non-EU		Retirement	Summer	Free	Sport5
7	DM	(Israel)	Ofir Kriaf	25	Non-EU	Ironi Kiryat Shmona	Release	Summer	Free	Maccabi Haifa
8	LW	(Israel)	Hen Ezra	27	Non-EU	Hapoel Tel Aviv	End of contract	Summer	Free	Maccabi Haifa
12	CB	(Israel)	Orel Dgani	27	Non-EU	Hapoel Tel Aviv	Release	Summer	Free	Sport5
13	LB	(Israel)	Taleb Tawatha	24	Non-EU	Eintracht Frankfurt (Germany)	Transfer	Summer	€1,500,000	Eintracht Frankfurt
15	AM	(Israel)	Yossi Benayoun	36	EU	Maccabi Tel Aviv	End of contract	Summer	Free	Walla!
28	RB	(Israel)	Yuval Yosipovich	22	Non-EU	Hapoel Petah Tikva	Loan Out	Summer	Free	
29	CF	(Israel)	Shimon Abuhatzira	29	EU	Beitar Jerusalem	Release	Summer	Free	Maccabi Haifa
32	DM	(Israel)	Kobi Moyal	28	Non-EU	Beitar Jerusalem	End of contract	Summer	Free	
52	DM	(Brazil)	Romário Pires	27	Non-EU	Maccabi Petah Tikva	End of contract	Summer	Free	
19	FW	(Israel)	Shahar Hirsh	23	Non-EU	Hapoel Tel Aviv	Loan out	Summer	Free	
30	CM	(Israel)	Eran Biton	20	Non-EU	Maccabi Sha'arayim	Loan out	Summer	Free	
10	CM	(Poland)	Ludovic Obraniak	31	EU	Auxerre (France)	Release	Summer	Free	
38	GK	(Serbia)	Vladimir Stojković	33	EU	Nottingham Forest (England)	Transfer	Summer	Free	
3	LB	(Croatia)	Mario Musa	26	EU	Dinamo Zagreb (Croatia)	Loan return	Winter	Free	
17	FW	(Israel)	Shoval Gozlan	23	Non-EU	Ironi Kiryat Shmona	Loan out	Winter	€25,000	
23	DM	(Israel)	Jaber Ataa	22	Non-EU	Bnei Sakhnin	Release	Winter	€270,000	Ynet
26	AM	(Israel)	Firas Mugrabi	25	Non-EU	Bnei Sakhnin	Release	Winter	€15,000	
27	RB	(Israel)	Eyal Meshumar	33	Non-EU	Hapoel Tel Aviv	Release	Winter	Free	
9	FW	(Netherlands)	Glynor Plet	29	EU	Alanyaspor (Turkey)	Release	Winter	Free	
2	CB	(Israel)	Ayid Habshi	21	Non-EU	Hapoel Ra'anana	Loan out	Winter	€19,000	

Total Income ▲: 1,829,000 €

=== Players out on loan ===
No.	Pos.	Nation	Player
—	GK	ISR	Tal Bomsthein (at Ironi Nesher until 30 June 2017)
2	DF	ISR	Ayid Habshi (at Hapoel Ra'anana until 30 June 2017)
28	DF	ISR	Yuval Yosipovich (at Hapoel Petah Tikva until 30 June 2017)
—	DF	ISR	Alaa Jafar (at Hapoel Bnei Lod until 30 June 2017)
30	MF	ISR	Eran Biton (at Maccabi Sha'arayim until 30 June 2017)
—	MF	ISR	Raz Meir (at Hapoel Ashkelon until 30 June 2017)

No.	Pos.	Nation	Player
17	FW	ISR	Shoval Gozlan (at Ironi Kiryat Shmona F.C. until 30 June 2017)
—	FW	ISR	Or Eiloz (at Hapoel Petah Tikva until 30 June 2017)
—	FW	ISR	Shon Weissman (at Maccabi Netanya until 30 June 2017)
—	FW	ISR	Omer Cohen (at F.C. Haifa Robi Shapira until 30 June 2017)
—	FW	ISR	Alon Turgeman (at Bnei Yehuda Tel Aviv until 30 June 2017)

== Pre-season and friendlies ==
Win Draw Loss Postponed

29 June 2016 Training Camp	Maccabi Haifa (Israel)	0–2	(Georgia (country)) Dinamo Tbilisi	Saalfelden, Austria
18:30	Ryan (yellow card) 23'; Obraniak (yellow card) 53'	Report	Kvilitaia 29'; Otar Kiteisvhili 34'; Lasha Parunashvili (yellow card) 53'	Stadium: Sportplatz Bürgerau

2 July 2016 Training Camp	Maccabi Haifa (Israel)	0–2	(Bulgaria) Ludogorets Razgrad	Saalfelden, Austria
19:00		Report	Campanharo 10'; Prepeliță 32'	Stadium: Sportplatz Bürgerau

5 July 2016 Training Camp	Maccabi Haifa (Israel)	2–1	(Albania) Skënderbeu Korçë	Saalfelden, Austria
19:00	Mugrabi 8'; Yonatan Levi (yellow card) 68'; Levita (yellow card) 70'; Zenati (yellow card) 73'; Gozlan 79'	Report	Lilaj 80' (pen.)	Stadium: Sportplatz Bürgerau

== Competitions ==
=== Overall ===
Competition	Started round	Current position / round	Final position / round	First match	Last match
Ligat Ha'Al	Matchday 1	-	6th	20 August 2016	20 May 2017
State Cup	Round of 32	–	Round of 32	7 January 2017	
Toto Cup	Group stage	-	Quarter-final	30 July 2016	30 December 2017
Europa League	Second qualifying round	–	Second qualifying round	14 July 2016	21 July 2016
Israel Super Cup	Final	–	Runners-up	11 August 2016	

=== Overview ===
Competition	Record							
Competition	G	W	D	L	GF	GA	GD	Win %
Ligat Ha'Al	32	12	8	12	34	36	−2	37.50
State Cup	1	0	0	1	0	2	−2	0.00
Toto Cup	6	3	2	1	9	7	+2	50.00
Europa League	2	0	2	0	2	2	+0	0.00
Israel Super Cup	1	0	0	1	2	4	−2	0.00
Total	42	15	12	15	47	51	−4	35.71

== Ligat Ha'Al ==
=== Regular season ===
Win Draw Loss

22 August 2016 1	Maccabi Haifa	1–0	Hapoel Tel Aviv	Haifa
20:50	Plet 56'; Yonathn Levi (yellow card) 90'	Report	Gotlieb (yellow card) 74'; Simić (yellow card) 90'	Stadium: Sammy Ofer Stadium; Attendance: 27,754; Referee: Roei Rainsriber

27 August 2016 2	Bnei Sakhnin	1–0	Maccabi Haifa	Sakhnin
20:10	Georginho 23', (yellow card) 24'	Report	Yonathn Levi (yellow card) 43'; Valiente (yellow card) 80'; Ryan (yellow card) 90'; Vacek (yellow card) 90'	Stadium: Doha Stadium; Attendance: 4,500; Referee: Alon Yefet

10 September 2016 3	Bnei Yehuda Tel Aviv	1–1	Maccabi Haifa	Petah Tikva
18:00	Abu Zaid (yellow card) 27'; Daniel Avital 38'; Azuz (yellow card) 57'; Turgeman (yellow card) 59'	Report	Rukavytsya 58' (pen.); Vacek (yellow card) 59'; Habshi (yellow card) 68'	Stadium: HaMoshava Stadium; Attendance: 7,500; Referee: Ziv Adler

19 September 2016 4	Maccabi Haifa	2–1	Hapoel Be'er Sheva	Haifa
20:55	Rukavytsya 22' (pen.); Kahat (yellow card) 38'; Rayn (yellow card) 53'; Plet 80'	report	Buzaglo 14'; Turjeman (yellow card) 22' vitor (yellow card) 66'	Stadium: Sammy Ofer Stadium; Attendance: 25,623; Referee: Eitan Shmuelevitz

26 September 2016 5	Maccabi Petah Tikva	2–2	Maccabi Haifa	Petah Tikva
20:30	Zhairi (yellow card) 25', (goal) 73'; Dor Elo 28'; Peser (yellow card) 53'	Report	Kahat 27'; Vacek (yellow card) 38'; Ryan (yellow card) 57'; Gozlan 90+3'; Keinan (yellow card) 90+5'	Stadium: HaMoshava Stadium; Attendance: 7,100; Referee: Roei Rainsriber

1 October 2016 6	Maccabi Haifa	0–0	Ironi Kiryat Shmona	Haifa
18:00	Lavi (yellow card) 15'; Atar (yellow card) 90'	Report	Biton (yellow card) 73'; Elkayam (yellow card) 90'	Stadium: Sammy Ofer Stadium; Attendance: 25,500; Referee: Avraham Ben-Sahlom

24 October 2016 7	Maccabi Tel Aviv	0–2	Maccabi Haifa	Netanya
20:45		Report	Atar 16'; Kahat (yellow card) 42'; Kagelmacher 73'	Stadium: Netanya Stadium; Attendance: 13,500; Referee: Orel Grennfeld

29 October 2016 8	Maccabi Haifa	5–0	Hapoel Ashkelon	Haifa
20:30	Menahem 17'; Plet 22'; Atar 45' (pen.), 81'; Vermouth 51' (pen.)	Report	Lugasi (yellow card) 34'	Stadium: Sammy Ofer Stadium; Attendance: 21,000; Referee: Igal Ferid

5 November 2016 9	Hapoel Haifa	0–0	Maccabi Haifa	Haifa
21:00	Bahia (yellow card) 68'	Report	Keinan (yellow card) 20'; Menahem (yellow card) 59'; Lavi (yellow card) 65'	Stadium: Sammy Ofer Stadium; Attendance: 25,300; Referee: Ziv Adler

19 November 2016 10	Maccabi Haifa	2–0	Hapoel Kfar Saba	Haifa
18:15	Atar 16'; Menahem 20', (yellow card) 83'	Report	Cohen (yellow card) 34'; Kachuba (yellow card) 47'; Dilmoni (yellow card) 89'	Stadium: Sammy Ofer Stadium; Attendance: 23,824; Referee: Roei Rainsriber

26 November 2016 11	F.C. Ashdod	1–1	Maccabi Haifa	Ashdod
19:30	David 14'; Tom Mond (yellow card) 24'; Beckel (yellow card) 78'; Bručić (yellow card) 88'	Report	Kahat 40', (yellow card) 64'; Keinan (yellow card) 45'; Vacek (yellow card) 64'; Lavi (yellow card) 76'; Ryan (yellow card) 88'	Stadium: Yud-Alef Stadium; Attendance: 7,000; Referee: Alon Yefet

5 December 2016 12	Maccabi Haifa	0–2	Beitar Jerusalem	Haifa
20:45	Kagelmacher (yellow card) 27'; Vacek (yellow card) 32'; Kahat (yellow card) 45'; Musa (yellow card) 60'; Menahem (yellow card) 77'	Report	Cohen 39', 68'; Raly (yellow card) 45'; Rueda (yellow card) 79'	Stadium: Sammy Ofer Stadium; Attendance: 29,214; Referee: Erez Papeir

10 December 2016 13	Hapoel Ra'anana	1–1	Maccabi Haifa	Netanya
20:30	Babayev 41'; Vehava (yellow card) 90+3'	Report	Jaber (yellow card) 24'; Atar (yellow card) 63', (goal) 70'	Stadium: Netanya Stadium; Attendance: 4,000; Referee: Liran Liany

19 December 2016 14	Hapoel Tel Aviv	0–2	Maccabi Haifa	Petah Tikva
21:00	Yadin (yellow card) 86'; Gotlieb	Report	Atar (yellow card) 39', (goal) 88' (pen.); Vermouth 90+4'	Stadium: HaMoshava Stadium; Attendance: 14,000; Referee: Eitan Shmuelevitz

26 December 2016 15	Maccabi Haifa	1–2	Bnei Sakhnin	Haifa
20:30	Keinan 21'; Vermouth (yellow card) 39'; Rukavytsya (yellow card) 39'; Musa (yellow card) 60'; Atar (yellow card) 90+3'	Report	Falah (yellow card) 39'; Khalaila (yellow card) 39'; Safouri 74'; Georginho 90'	Stadium: Sammy Ofer Stadium; Attendance: 17,127; Referee: Gal Leibovich

31 December 2016 16	Maccabi Haifa	1–1	Bnei Yehuda Tel Aviv	Haifa
18:15	Vermouth 59'; Atar (penalty missed) 90+3'	Report	Yonatan Cohen 50'; Mitrović (yellow card) 53'	Stadium: Sammy Ofer Stadium; Attendance: 12,987; Referee: Ziv Adler

10 January 2017 17	Hapoel Be'er Sheva	2–0	Maccabi Haifa	Be'er Sheva
21:00	Nwakaeme 36'; Sahar 66' (pen.)	Report	Vacek (yellow card) 30'; Menahem (yellow card) 73'; Valiente (red card) 90'	Stadium: Terner Stadium; Attendance: 15,000; Referee: Alon Yefet

14 January 2017 18	Maccabi Haifa	0–2	Maccabi Petah Tikva	Haifa
18:15	Lavi (red card) 89'; Vermouth 73'	Report	Adamović 48'; Guy Melamed 51'	Stadium: Sammy Ofer Stadium; Attendance: 13,623; Referee: Guy Berger

21 January 2017 19	Ironi Kiryat Shmona	3–0	Maccabi Haifa	Kiryat Shmona
16:00	Kriaf 21'; Azulay (FW) 86'; Azulay (MF) 90'	Report		Stadium: Municipal Stadium; Attendance: 2,800; Referee: Tzvika Levi

30 January 2017 20	Maccabi Haifa	2–2	Maccabi Tel Aviv	Haifa
21:00	Damari 10'; Kagelmacher (yellow card) 29'; Alushi (yellow card) 34'; Vacek (yellow card) 50'; Kahat 87'	Report	Golasa (yellow card) 16'; Alberman (yellow card) 42'; Kjartansson 66', 90+2', (yellow card) 74'; Yitzhaki (yellow card) 70'	Stadium: Sammy Ofer Stadium; Attendance: 26,216; Referee: Eli Hacmon

6 February 2017 21	Hapoel Ashkelon	0–2	Maccabi Haifa	Ashkelon
20:30	Haddad (yellow card) 26'; Ben-Shimon (yellow card) 34'; Makhlouf (yellow card) 65'; Mesika (yellow card) 72'; Aiyenugba (yellow card) 80'	Report	Damari (penalty missed) 26', 27'Atar 85' (pen.)	Stadium: Sala Stadium; Attendance: 3,700; Referee: Daniel Bar-Naten

11 February 2017 22	Maccabi Haifa	0–3	Hapoel Haifa	Haifa
16:00	Vacek (yellow card) 17'; Alushi (yellow card) 84'	Report	Lala 28', 76'; Scheimann (yellow card) 27'; Arbeitman 84'	Stadium: Sammy Ofer Stadium; Attendance: 27,643; Referee: Roei Rainsriber

18 February 2017 23	Hapoel Kfar Saba	0–2	Maccabi Haifa	Haifa
16:00	Sahar Brown (yellow card) 80'	Report	Keinan 11', 78'; Menahem (yellow card) 90'	Stadium: Sammy Ofer Stadium; Attendance: 4,000; Referee: Ziv Adler

25 February 2017 24	Maccabi Haifa	0–1	F.C. Ashdod	Haifa
18:15	Menahem (red card) 50'; Atar (yellow card) 45'	Report	Tom Ben Zaken (yellow card) 55'; Miki Siroshrtein (yellow card) 60'; Tom Mond (yellow card) 65'; Or Inbrom 67'; Kinda (yellow card) 78'	Stadium: Sammy Ofer Stadium; Attendance: 16,904; Referee: Idan Leiba

6 March 2017 25	Beitar Jerusalem	0–1	Maccabi Haifa	Jerusalem
21:00	Conte (yellow card) 38'; Mori (yellow card) 90+3'	Report	Vacek (yellow card) 14'; Shay Ben David (yellow card) 22'; Vermouth 36'; Ryan (yellow card) 58'; Keinan (yellow card) 90+1'	Stadium: Teddy Stadium; Attendance: 15,000; Referee: Eli Hacmon

11 March 2017 26	Maccabi Haifa	2–0	Hapoel Ra'anana	Haifa
20:30	Kahat (yellow card) 12'; Vermouth 20' (pen.), 45+1' (pen.); Ryan (yellow card) 83'; Vermouth (yellow card) 87'; Amit Zantti (yellow card) 90'	Report	Shukrani (yellow card) 56'; Vehava (yellow card) 82'; Shaker (yellow card) 90'	Stadium: Sammy Ofer Stadium; Attendance: 18,300; Referee: Menashe Mashiah

==== Regular season table ====
Pos	Team	Pld	W	D	L	GF	GA	GD	Pts	Qualification or relegation
4	Beitar Jerusalem	26	10	10	6	34	27	+7	40	Qualification for the Championship round
5	Bnei Sakhnin	26	10	9	7	26	26	0	39	Qualification for the Championship round
6	Maccabi Haifa	26	10	8	8	30	25	+5	38	Qualification for the Championship round
7	Ironi Kiryat Shmona	26	9	8	9	35	33	+2	35	Qualification for the Relegation round
8	Hapoel Haifa	26	8	4	14	29	36	−7	28	Qualification for the Relegation round

Source: Israel Football Association, Soccerway
Rules for classification: 1) Points; 2) Goal difference; 3) Matches won; 4) Goals scored; 5) Head-to-head points; 6) Head-to-head goal difference; 7) Head-to-head goals scored; 8) Play-off.

=== Play-off ===
19 March 2017 27	Hapoel Be'er Sheva	4–0	Maccabi Haifa	Be'er Sheva
21:00	Hoban 41'; Ogu (yellow card) 45'; Ohana 55'; Soares (yellow card) 59'; Sahar 86' (pen.); Radi 90+3'	Report	Eyjólfsson (yellow card) 28'; Menahem (yellow card) 42'; Yaniv Brik (yellow card) 57'; Keinan (yellow card) 89'	Stadium: Terner Stadium; Referee: Erez Papeir

1 April 2017 28	Maccabi Haifa	3–2	Beitar Jerusalem	Haifa
19:30	Awaed 32'; Keinan (yellow card) 39'; Rukavytsya 42', 51'; Kagelmacher (yellow card) 60'	Report	Ezra 22', (yellow card) 60'; Shechter 40' (pen.), (yellow card) 45'; Dilmoni (red card) 72'	Stadium: Sammy Ofer Stadium; Attendance: 19,814; Referee: Daniel Bar-Naten

9 April 2017 29	Maccabi Tel Aviv	3–0	Maccabi Haifa	Netanya
21:00	Tal Ben Haim II 28', 78'; Micha 36'	Report	Vermouth (yellow card) 75'	Stadium: Netanya Stadium; Attendance: 13,000; Referee: Alon Yefet

15 April 2017 30	Maccabi Haifa	0–1	Bnei Sakhnin	Haifa
18:00	Gary Kagelmacher (yellow card) 24'; Kahat (yellow card) 54'; Eitan Velblum (yellow card) 70'; Yaniv Brik (yellow card) 86'	Report	Lax (yellow card) 1'; Safouri (yellow card) 12'; Avidor 48'	Stadium: Sammy Ofer Stadium; Attendance: 14,973; Referee: Gal Leibovich

22 April 2017 31	Maccabi Petah Tikva	0–1	Maccabi Haifa	Petah Tikva
18:00	Kanyuk (yellow card) 57'	Report	Keinan 10'; Kahat (yellow card) 34'; Yaniv Brik (yellow card) 73'	Stadium: HaMoshava Stadium; Attendance: 4,000; Referee: Guy Berger

25 April 2017 32	Maccabi Haifa	0–1	Hapoel Be'er Sheva	Haifa
21:00	Kahat (yellow card) 59'; Atar (yellow card) 75'; Lavi (yellow card) 85'	Report	Nwakaeme 6'; Vítor (yellow card) 29'; Turjeman (yellow card) 75'; Bitton (yellow card) 85'	Stadium: Sammy Ofer Stadium; Attendance: 19,723; Referee: Eitan Shmuelevitz

29 April 2017 33	Beitar Jerusalem	2–0	Maccabi Haifa	Jerusalem
20:00		Report		Stadium: Teddy Stadium

6 May 2017 34	Maccabi Haifa	0–2	Maccabi Tel Aviv	Haifa
		Report		Stadium: Sammy Ofer Stadium

13 May 2017 35	Bnei Sakhnin	1–0	Maccabi Haifa	Sakhnin
		Report		Stadium: Doha Stadium

20 May 2017 36	Maccabi Haifa	0–0	Maccabi Petah Tikva	Haifa
		Report		Stadium: Sammy Ofer Stadium

==== Championship round table ====
Pos	Team	Pld	W	D	L	GF	GA	GD	Pts	Qualification
1	Hapoel Be'er Sheva (C, Q)	36	26	7	3	73	18	+55	85	Qualification for the Champions League second qualifying round
2	Maccabi Tel Aviv (Q)	36	22	6	8	61	28	+33	72	Qualification for the Europa League first qualifying round
3	Beitar Jerusalem (Q)	36	16	12	8	53	36	+17	60	Qualification for the Europa League first qualifying round
4	Maccabi Petah Tikva	36	15	11	10	42	34	+8	56	
5	Bnei Sakhnin	36	13	9	14	32	46	−14	48	
6	Maccabi Haifa	36	12	9	15	34	41	−7	45	

Source: Israel Football Association, Soccerway
Rules for classification: 1) Points; 2) Goal difference; 3) Matches won; 4) Goals scored; 5) Head-to-head points; 6) Head-to-head goal difference; 7) Head-to-head goals scored; 8) Play-off.
(C) Champions; (Q) Qualified for the phase indicated

=== Results summary ===
Overall								Home						Away					
Pld	W	D	L	GF	GA	GD	Pts	W	D	L	GF	GA	GD	W	D	L	GF	GA	GD
32	12	8	12	34	36	−2	44	6	3	7	19	18	+1	6	5	5	15	18	−3

Source: Competitive matches

=== Results by round ===
Round	1	2	3	4	5	6	7	8	9	10	11	12	13	14	15	16	17	18	19	20	21	22	23	24	25	26	27	28	29	30	31	32	33	34	35	36
Ground	H	A	A	H	A	H	A	H	A	H	A	H	A	A	H	H	A	H	A	H	A	H	A	H	A	H	A	H	A	H	A	H	A	H	A	H
Result	W	L	D	W	D	D	W	W	D	W	D	L	D	W	L	D	L	L	L	D	W	L	W	L	W	W	L	W	L	L	W	L	L	L	L	D
Position	5	8	6	4	5	5	4	4	4	3	3	3	3	3	4	4	5	6	7	7	7	7	6	7	7	6	6	6	6	6	6	6	6	6	6	6

Source: Competitive Matches
A = Away; H = Home; W = Win; D = Draw; L = Loss

== State Cup ==
=== Round of 32 ===
7 January 2017 Round of 32	Maccabi Haifa	0–2	Maccabi Petah Tikva	Haifa
16:30	Lavi (yellow card) 40'; Abu Abaid (yellow card) 45'; Menahem (yellow card) 70'; Awaed (yellow card) 87'	Report	Kalibat (yellow card) 14'; Guy Melamed 40'; Romário Pires (yellow card) 70'; Adamović 90+2'	Stadium: Sammy Ofer Stadium; Attendance: 9,632; Referee: Eli Hacmon

== Toto Cup ==
=== Group stage ===
Pos	Team	Pld	W	D	L	GF	GA	GD	Pts	Qualification or relegation
1	Maccabi Haifa	4	3	1	0	6	3	+3	10	Qualified to Quarter-finals
2	Hapoel Haifa	4	1	2	1	5	4	+1	5	Qualified to Quarter-finals
3	Hapoel Kiryat Shmona	4	0	4	0	2	2	0	4	Qualified to Quarter-finals
4	Bnei Sakhnin	4	0	3	1	4	5	−1	3	
5	Hapoel Kfar Saba	4	0	2	2	2	5	−3	2	

Updated to match(es) played on 16 August 2016. Source: Israel Football Association
Rules for classification: 1) points; 2) goal difference; 3) number of wins; 4) goals scored; 5) head to head; 6)deciding match.

30 July 2016 1	Ironi Kiryat Shmona	0–0	Maccabi Haifa	Akko
20:00	Elkayam (yellow card) 6'	Report	Keinan (red card) 1'; Meshumar (yellow card) 79'	Stadium: Municipal Stadium; Attendance: 1,500; Referee: Erez Papeir

6 August 2016 3	Maccabi Haifa	2–1	Bnei Sakhnin	Netanya
21:00	Mugrabi 22'; Menahem (yellow card) 54'; Gozlan 73'	Report	Tita (yellow card) 21'; Tambi Sagas (yellow card) 55'; Ottman (yellow card) 55'; Safouri 64'	Stadium: Netanya Stadium; Attendance: 2,500; Referee: Ziv Adler

13 September 2016 4	Hapoel Kfar Saba	2–3	Maccabi Haifa	Kfar Saba
19:30	Ben Khawaz (yellow card) 19'; Hadida 59'; Elyakim (yellow card) 67'; Tchibota (yellow card) 89'	Report	Gozlan 23'; Habshi (yellow card) 35'; Mugrabi 40'; Plet 70'	Stadium: Levita Stadium; Attendance: 350; Referee: Roei Rainsriber

16 August 2016 5	Maccabi Haifa	1–0	Hapoel Haifa	Netanya
19:30	Mugrabi 79'	Report		Stadium: Netanya Stadium; Attendance: 2,500; Referee: Eitan Shmuelevitz

==== Quarter-final ====
22 September 2016 First Leg	Maccabi Haifa	2–2	Hapoel Be'er Sheva	Haifa
21:00	Habshi (yellow card) 17'; Mugrabi 32' (pen.); Gozlan 49'; Musa (yellow card) 52'; Menahem (yellow card) 60'	Report	Korhut 43'; Gordana 72'; Taha (yellow card) 84'	Stadium: Sammy Ofer Stadium; Attendance: 3,042; Referee: Orel Greenfield

30 November 2016 Second Leg	Hapoel Be'er Sheva	2–1 (4–3 agg.)	Maccabi Haifa	Be'er Sheva
19:00	Taha (yellow card) 37'; Nwakaeme 77', 78'	Report	Kahat (yellow card) 21'; Gozlan (yellow card) 37'; Glazer (yellow card) 66'; Rukavytsya 88' (pen.); Ryan (yellow card) 90+3'	Stadium: Terner Stadium; Attendance: 9,000; Referee: Orel Grennfeld

== Israel Super Cup ==
11 August 2016	Hapoel Be'er Sheva	4–2	Maccabi Haifa	Netanya, Israel
	Rukavytsya 7'; Gozlan 22', (yellow card) 57'; Yaniv Brik (yellow card) 28'; Mugrabi (yellow card) 45'; Kagelmacher (yellow card) 82'	Report	Tzedek (yellow card) 21'; Radi (penalty missed) 50'; Maor Buzaglo 54', 69', (yellow card) 87'; Nwakaeme 84'; Ben Sahar 90+3'	Stadium: Netanya Stadium; Attendance: 10,200; Referee: Erez Papeir

== Europa League ==
=== Second qualifying round ===
14 July 2016 Second round	Maccabi Haifa (Israel)	1–1	(Estonia) Nõmme Kalju	Netanya, Israel
20:00	Mugrabi (yellow card) 53'; Vermouth 70'	Report	Quintieri (yellow card) 44'; Janar Toomet 47'; Artur Valikaev (yellow card) 63'; Andrei Sidorenkov (yellow card) 87'; Teleš (yellow card) 90'	Stadium: Netanya Stadium; Attendance: 6,500; Referee: (Norway) Svein-Erik Edvartsen

21 July 2016 Second round	Nõmme Kalju (Estonia)	1–1 (a.e.t.) (5–3 p)	(Israel) Maccabi Haifa	Tallinn, Estonia
19:00	Neemelo 89'	Report	Rukavytsya 34' (pen.); Vermouth (yellow card) 43'; Obraniak (yellow card) 72'; Valiente (yellow card) 80'	Stadium: Kadriorg Stadium; Attendance: 600; Referee: (Austria) Markus Hameter
	Penalties
	Maximiliano Uggè (penalty scored); Sidorenkov (penalty scored); Purje (penalty scored); Wakui (penalty scored); Subbotin (penalty scored)		Obraniak (penalty scored); Rukavytsya (penalty scored); Zenati (penalty missed); Menahem (penalty scored)

== Statistics ==
=== Squad statistics ===
Updated on 18 March 2017

			Ligat Ha'Al					State Cup					Toto Cup					Europa League					Israel Super Cup					Total				
Nation	No.	Name		GS	Min.	Goal	Assist		GS	Min.	Goal	Assist		GS	Min.	Goal	Assist		GS	Min.	Goal	Assist		GS	Min.	Goal	Assist		GS	Min.	Goal	Assist
Goalkeepers
(Israel)	1	Ohad Levita	10	10	948	0	0	0	0	0	0	0	3	3	288	0	0	2	2	222	0	0	1	1	96	0	0	16	16	1,544	0	0
(Israel)	22	Gil Ofek	0	0	0	0	0	0	0	0	0	0	0	0	0	0	0	0	0	0	0	0	0	0	0	0	0	0	0	0	0	0
(Israel)	55	Omri Glazer	16	16	1,606	0	0	1	1	95	0	0	3	3	283	0	0	0	0	0	0	0	0	0	0	0	0	20	20	1,984	0	0
Defenders
(Israel)	3	Shay Ben David	4	3	312	0	0	0	0	0	0	0	3	1	113	0	0	0	0	0	0	0	0	0	0	0	0	7	4	425	0	0
(Spain)	4	Marc Valiente	17	16	1,481	0	1	1	1	95	2	2	122	0	0	0	1	2	2	222	0	0	1	1	96	0	0	23	22	2,016	0	2
(Israel)	5	Eyad Abu Abaid	7	6	582	0	0	1	1	80	0	0	6	4	425	0	1	2	2	222	0	0	1	0	38	0	0	17	13	1,783	0	1
(Uruguay)	6	Gary Kagelmacher	25	25	2,363	1	1	1	1	95	0	0	4	3	322	0	0	2	2	193	0	0	1	1	96	0	0	33	33	3,069	1	1
(Israel)	7	Sun Menahem	16	14	1,360	2	1	1	1	95	0	0	5	4	446	0	1	2	2	222	0	0	1	1	96	0	1	25	22	2,219	2	3
(Iceland)	15	Hólmar Örn Eyjólfsson	9	9	830	0	0	0	0	0	0	0	0	0	0	0	0	0	0	0	0	0	0	0	0	0	0	9	9	830	0	0
(Israel)	21	Dekel Keinan	23	23	1,721	3	0	1	1	95	0	0	3	3	192	0	0	1	0	55	0	0	1	1	60	0	0	29	28	2,123	3	0
(Israel)	34	Yahav Gurfinkel	1	0	11	0	0	0	0	0	0	0	2	0	34	0	0	0	0	0	0	0	0	0	0	0	0	3	0	45	0	0
(Israel)	40	Yonathn Levi	2	2	190	0	0	0	0	0	0	0	6	3	318	0	0	0	0	0	0	0	0	0	0	0	0	8	5	508	0	0
Midfielders
(Kosovo)	8	Enis Alushi	7	7	549	0	0	0	0	0	0	0	0	0	0	0	0	0	0	0	0	0	0	0	0	0	0	7	7	549	0	0
(Israel)	11	Ismaeel Ryan	14	6	674	2	0	0	0	0	0	0	3	3	249	0	2	1	0	16	0	0	0	0	0	0	0	18	9	939	0	4
(Israel)	14	Gili Vermouth	22	20	1,678	6	3	1	1	95	0	0	2	2	154	0	0	2	2	185	1	0	1	0	23	0	0	28	25	2,135	7	3
(Israel)	19	Roi Kahat	25	22	1,947	3	0	1	1	29	0	0	2	1	100	0	0	0	0	0	0	0	0	0	0	0	0	28	24	1,810	3	0
(Czech Republic)	25	Kamil Vacek	21	20	1,886	0	1	0	0	0	0	0	3	3	236	0	0	0	0	0	0	0	0	1	0	29	0	25	23	2,151	0	1
(Israel)	28	Yaniv Brik	5	3	252	0	0	0	0	0	0	0	3	2	154	0	0	0	0	0	0	0	1	1	67	0	0	9	6	473	0	0
(Israel)	31	Neta Lavi	23	20	1,966	0	1	1	1	66	0	0	6	5	490	0	1	2	2	222	0	0	1	1	96	0	0	33	28	2,507	0	1
(Israel)	35	Eitan Velblum	0	0	0	0	0	0	0	0	0	0	2	0	43	0	0	0	0	0	0	0	0	0	0	0	0	2	0	43	0	0
(Israel)	36	Mohammad Abu Fani	0	0	0	0	0	0	0	0	0	0	1	0	22	0	0	0	0	0	0	0	0	0	0	0	0	1	0	22	0	0
Forwards
(Norway)	9	Fitim Azemi	7	2	315	0	0	0	0	0	0	0	0	0	0	0	0	0	0	0	0	0	0	0	0	0	0	7	2	315	0	0
(Israel)	10	Omer Damari	5	4	350	2	0	0	0	0	0	0	0	0	0	0	0	0	0	0	0	0	0	0	0	0	0	5	4	350	2	0
(Australia) (Israel)	13	Nikita Rukavytsya	18	12	1,072	3	3	1	1	95	0	0	3	2	177	1	1	2	2	222	1	0	1	1	61	1	0	25	18	1,616	5	0
(Israel)	16	Eliran Atar	16	14	1,305	7	1	1	1	29	0	0	1	0	20	0	0	0	0	0	0	0	0	0	0	0	0	18	15	1,354	7	1
(Israel)	29	Mohammed Awaed	5	2	194	0	0	1	66	0	0	0	4	0	99	0	0	0	0	0	0	0	0	0	0	0	0	10	2	359	0	0
(Israel)	32	Amit Zenati	9	5	486	0	1	0	0	0	0	0	6	2	170	0	0	1	1	35	0	0	1	0	33	0	0	17	7	724	0	1
Players who no longer play for Maccabi Haifa
(Israel)	2	Ayid Habshi	6	3	319	0	0	0	0	0	0	0	3	1	0	0	0	2	1	75	0	0	0	0	0	0	0	11	5	580	0	0
(Croatia)	3	Mario Musa	11	11	886	0	1	0	0	0	0	0	1	1	88	0	0	0	0	0	0	0	0	0	0	0	0	12	12	974	0	1
(Netherlands)	9	Glynor Plet	12	7	778	3	3	0	0	0	0	0	4	1	177	1	1	0	0	0	0	0	1	1	26	0	0	17	8	98	4	4
(Poland)	10	Ludovic Obraniak	0	0	0	0	0	0	0	0	0	0	0	0	0	0	0	2	2	222	0	0	0	0	0	0	0	2	2	222	0	0
(Israel)	17	Shoval Gozlan	11	0	231	1	2	0	0	0	0	0	1	1	500	3	0	2	0	78	0	0	1	1	70	1	0	19	6	861	5	2
(Israel)	23	Jaber Ataa	3	2	156	0	0	0	0	0	0	0	1	1	80	0	0	0	0	0	0	0	0	0	0	0	0	4	3	236	0	0
(Israel)	26	Firas Mugrabi	11	5	540	0	0	0	0	0	0	0	6	6	539	4	0	2	2	159	0	0	1	1	75	0	1	20	14	1,313	4	1
(Israel)	27	Eyal Meshumar	0	0	0	0	0	0	0	0	0	0	3	3	238	0	0	2	2	159	0	0	1	1	96	0	0	6	6	493	0	0

=== Goals ===
Updated on 17 March 2017

Rank	Player	Position	Ligat Ha'Al	State Cup	Toto Cup	Europa League	Israel Super Cup	Total
1	(Israel) Eliran Atar	FW	7	0	0	0	0	7
1	(Israel) Gili Vermouth	MF	6	0	0	1	0	7
2	(Australia) Nikita Rukavytsya	FW	2	0	1	1	1	5
2	(Israel) Shoval Gozlan	FW	1	0	3	0	1	5
4	(Netherlands) Glynor Plet	FW	3	0	1	0	0	4
4	(Israel) Firas Mugrabi	MF	0	0	4	0	0	4
4	(Israel) Roi Kahat	MF	3	0	0	0	0	3
4	(Israel) Dekel Keinan	DF	3	0	0	0	0	3
5	(Israel) Sun Menahem	DF	2	0	0	0	0	2
5	(Israel) Omer Damari	FW	2	0	0	0	0	2
6	(Uruguay) Gary Kagelmacher	DF	1	0	0	0	0	1
Total			30	0	9	2	2	43

=== Clean sheets ===
Updated on 17 March 2017

Rank	Pos.	No.	Name	Ligat Ha'Al	State Cup	Toto Cup	Europa League	Israel Super Cup	Total
1	GK	55	(Israel) Omri Glazer	8					8
2	GK	1	(Israel) Ohad Levita	3		2			5
Total				11		2			13

=== Disciplinary record ===
Updated on 17 March 2017

No.	Pos	Nat	Name	Ligat Ha'Al			State Cup			Toto Cup			Israel Super Cup			Europa League			Total		
No.	Pos	Nat	Name	Yellow card	(yellow card) (yellow-red card)	Red card	Yellow card	(yellow card) (yellow-red card)	Red card	Yellow card	(yellow card) (yellow-red card)	Red card	Yellow card	(yellow card) (yellow-red card)	Red card	Yellow card	(yellow card) (yellow-red card)	Red card	Yellow card	(yellow card) (yellow-red card)	Red card
25	MF	(Czech Republic)	Kamil Vacek	9															9		
7	DF	(Israel)	Sun Menahem	6	1					2									8	1	
16	FW	(Israel)	Eliran Atar	5															5		
19	MF	(Israel)	Roi Kahat	5						1									6		
11	MF	(Israel)	Ismaeel Ryan	6						1									7		
31	MF	(Israel)	Neta Lavi	4	1														4	1	
21	DF	(Israel)	Dekel Keinan	4								1							4		1
6	DF	(Uruguay)	Gary Kagelmacher	2									1						3		
4	DF	(Spain)	Marc Valiente	1	1											1			2	1	
40	DF	(Israel)	Yonathn Levi	2															2		
14	MF	(Israel)	Gili Vermouth	2												1			3		
8	MF	(Kosovo)	Enis Alushi	2															2		
55	GK	(Israel)	Omri Glazer	1															1		
13	FW	(Australia)	Nikita Rukavytsya	1															1		
5	DF	(Israel)	Eyad Abu Abaid				1												1		
29	FW	(Israel)	Mohammed Awaed				1												1		
3	DF	(Israel)	Shay Ben David	1															1		
28	MF	(Israel)	Yaniv Brik										1						1		
32	DF	(Israel)	Amit Zantti	1															1		
2	DF	(Israel)	Ayid Habshi	1						2									3		
3	DF	(Croatia)	Mario Musa	2						1									3		
17	FW	(Israel)	Shoval Gozlan										2						2		
26	MF	(Israel)	Firas Mugrabi										1			1			2		
27	DF	(Israel)	Eyal Meshumar							1									1		
23	MF	(Israel)	Ataa Jaber	1															1		
10	MF	(Poland)	Ludovic Obraniak													1			1		

==== Suspensions ====
Player	Date received	Offence	Length of suspension	
Dekel Keinan	30 July 2016	(red card) 1' vs Hapoel Ironi Kiryat Shmona	1 match	Bnei Sakhnin (H) (Toto Cup)
Kamil Vacek	30 July 2016	(yellow card) 32' vs Beitar Jerusalem	1 match	Hapoel Tel Aviv F.C. (A)
Marc Valiente	10 January 2017	(red card) 90' vs Hapoel Be'er Sheva	1 match	Maccabi Petah Tikva (H)
Neta Lavi	14 January 2017	(red card) 89' vs Maccabi Petah Tikva	1 match	Ironi Kiryat Shmona (A)
Sun Menahem	25 February 2017	(red card) 50' vs F.C. Ashdod	1 match	Beitar Jerusalem (A)
Eliran Atar	25 February 2017	(yellow card) 45' vs F.C. Ashdod	1 match	Hapoel Ra'anana (A)
Kamil Vacek	6 March 2017	(yellow card) 14' vs Beitar Jerusalem	1 match	Hapoel Be'er Sheva (A)
Ismaeel Ryan	6 March 2017	(yellow card) 32' vs Beitar Jerusalem	1 match	Hapoel Be'er Sheva (A)
Roi Kahat	11 March 2017	(yellow card) 12' vs Hapoel Ra'anana	1 match	Beitar Jerusalem (H)
Neta Lavi	11 March 2017	(yellow card) 46' vs Hapoel Ra'anana	1 match	Beitar Jerusalem (H)

Last updated: 7 March 2017.

=== Overall ===
	Total	Home	Away	Natural
Games played	36	18	17	1
Games won	13	7	6	-
Games drawn	12	6	6	
Games lost	11	6	4	1
Biggest win	5–0 vs Hapoel Ashkelon	5–0 vs Hapoel Ashkelon	2–0 vs Maccabi Tel Aviv; 2–0 vs Hapoel Kfar Saba	-
Biggest loss	0-3 vs Hapoel Haifa	0-3 vs Hapoel Haifa	0–2 vs Hapoel Be'er Sheva	2–4 vs Hapoel Be'er Sheva
Biggest win (League)	5–0 vs Hapoel Ashkelon	5–0 vs Hapoel Ashkelon	2–0 vs Maccabi Tel Aviv; 2–0 vs Hapoel Kfar Saba	
Biggest loss (League)	0-3 vs Hapoel Haifa	0-3 vs Hapoel Haifa	0–2 vs Hapoel Be'er Sheva	
Biggest win (Cup)	-	-	-	-
Biggest loss (Cup)	0–2 vs Maccabi Petah Tikva	0–2 vs Maccabi Petah Tikva	-	-
Biggest win (Toto)	3–2 vs Hapoel Kfar Saba; 2–1 vs Bnei Sakhnin; 1–0 vs Hapoel Haifa	2–1 vs Bnei Sakhnin; 1–0 vs Hapoel Haifa	3–2 vs Hapoel Kfar Saba	-
Biggest loss (Toto)	1–2 vs Hapoel Be'er Sheva	-	1–2 vs Hapoel Be'er Sheva	
Biggest win (Suprcup)	-			-
Biggest loss (Suprcup)	2–4 vs Hapoel Be'er Sheva			2–4 vs Hapoel Be'er Sheva
Biggest win (Europa)	-	-	-	-
Biggest loss (Europa)	-	-	-	-
Goals scored	43	22	19	2
Goals conceded	40	20	16	4
Goal difference	3	2	3	-2
Clean sheets	13	6	7	0
Average GF per game	1.19	1.22	1.12	2
Average GA per game	1.11	1.11	0.94	4
Yellow cards	75	34	37	4
Red cards	4	2	2	-
Most appearances	Gary Kagelmacher (33)			
Most minutes played	Gary Kagelmacher (3,069)			
Most goals	Eliran Atar and Gili Vermouth (7)			
Penalties for	13	7	6	-
Penalties against	1	-	1	-
Winning rate	36.11%	38.89%	35.29%	0%

Last updated: Updated on 17 March 2017
Source: Competitive matches
