= Reef Mesika =

Israeli footballer

Personal information
- Full name: Reef Mesika
- Date of birth: June 15, 1989 (age 37)
- Place of birth: Netanya, Israel
- Height: 1.77 m (5 ft 9 1/2 in)
- Position: Midfielder

Team information
- Current team: Maccabi Kiryat Gat

Youth career
- Beitar Nes Tubruk
- 2004–2008: Maccabi Netanya

Senior career*
Years	Team	Apps	(Gls)
2006–2010	Maccabi Netanya	5	(0)
2008	→ Maccabi Herzliya	14	(0)
2009	→ Hapoel Ramat HaSharon	10	(1)
2010–2011	Hapoel Herzliya	32	(8)
2011–2012	Hapoel Rishon LeZion	27	(2)
2012–2013	Hapoel Bnei Lod	33	(4)
2013–2014	Hapoel Tel Aviv	0	(0)
2014	Hapoel Ra'anana	14	(1)
2014–2016	Hapoel Kfar Saba	60	(7)
2016–2017	Hapoel Ashkelon	21	(1)
2017–2018	Maccabi Herzliya	27	(2)
2018–2020	Hapoel Umm al-Fahm	46	(12)
2020	Hapoel Rishon LeZion	12	(1)
2020–2021	Hapoel Hadera	15	(0)
2021–2022	Maccabi Bnei Reineh	52	(19)
2022–2024	Hapoel Umm al-Fahm	37	(5)
2024	Ironi Tiberias	21	(1)
2024–2025	Hapoel Kfar Shalem	33	(8)
2025	Hapoel Acre	2	(0)
2025–2026	Maccabi Kiryat Gat	19	(6)
2026–	Hapoel Ramat HaSharon	0	(0)

International career
2007	Israel U18	2	(0)
2007	Israel U19	2	(0)
- * Club domestic league appearances and goals as of 1 June 2026

Reef Mesika (Hebrew: ריף מסיקה; born 15 June 1989) is an Israeli footballer who plays for Hapoel Ramat HaSharon. He is the son of Haim Messika, a former footballer who also played for Maccabi Netanya and Hapoel Kfar Saba.

He is of a Tunisian-Jewish descent.

== Club career statistics ==
(correct as of 1 June 2022)

Club	Season	League		Cup		Toto Cup		Europe		Total	
Club	Season	Apps	Goals	Apps	Goals	Apps	Goals	Apps	Goals	Apps	Goals
Maccabi Netanya	2006–07	0	0	0	0	6	0	0	0	6	0
Maccabi Netanya	2007–08	0	0	0	0	2	0	0	0	2	0
Maccabi Herzliya	2008–09	14	0	0	0	7	0	0	0	21	0
Hapoel Ramat HaSharon	2008–09	10	1	1	0	2	0	0	0	13	1
Maccabi Netanya	2009–10	5	0	0	0	6	0	1	0	12	0
Hapoel Herzliya	2010–11	32	8	1	0	4	1	0	0	37	9
Hapoel Rishon LeZion	2011–12	27	2	1	0	3	0	0	0	31	2
Hapoel Bnei Lod	2012–13	33	4	2	0	5	3	0	0	40	7
Hapoel Tel Aviv	2013–14	0	0	0	0	0	0	0	0	0	0
Hapoel Ra'anana	2013–14	14	1	2	0	0	0	0	0	16	1
Hapoel Kfar Saba	2014–15	34	4	4	1	4	2	0	0	42	7
Hapoel Kfar Saba	2015–16	26	3	0	0	2	0	0	0	28	3
Hapoel Ashkelon	2016–17	21	1	2	0	1	0	0	0	24	1
Maccabi Herzliya	2017–18	27	2	1	0	2	0	0	0	30	2
Hapoel Umm al-Fahm	2018–19	26	6	0	0	0	0	0	0	26	6
Hapoel Umm al-Fahm	2019–20	20	6	3	1	4	0	0	0	37	7
Hapoel Rishon LeZion	2019–20	12	1	0	0	0	0	0	0	12	1
Hapoel Hadera	2020–21	15	0	0	0	3	0	0	0	18	0
Maccabi Bnei Reineh	2020–21	16	5	0	0	0	0	0	0	16	5
Maccabi Bnei Reineh	2021–22	36	14	1	0	0	0	0	0	37	14
Career		366	58	17	2	48	6	1	0	426	66

== Honours ==
- Liga Leumit
  - Winner (1): 2021-22
  - Runner-up (2): 2014–15, 2023–24
- Liga Alef
  - Winner (2): 2018-19, 2020-21
- Liga Leumit Footballer of the Season
  - Winner (1): 2021–22
