= 2021–22 Liga Leumit =

Liga Leumit
- Season: 2021–22
- Champions: Maccabi Bnei Reineh
- Promoted: Maccabi Bnei Reineh; Sektzia Ness Ziona
- Relegated: Hapoel Ra'anana; Beitar Tel Aviv Bat Yam
- Matches: 240
- Goals: 550 (2.29 per match)
- Top goalscorer: Dudu Biton (18)

The 2021–22 Liga Leumit was the 23rd season as second tier since its re-alignment in 1999 and the 80th season of second-tier football in Israel.

A total of sixteen teams contested in the league, including twelve sides from the 2020-21 season, the two promoted teams from 2020–21 Liga Alef and the two relegated teams from 2020–21 Israeli Premier League.

== Changes from 2020–21 season ==
=== Team changes ===
The following teams have changed division since the 2020–21 season.

=== To Liga Leumit ===
Promoted from Liga Alef

- Hapoel Ashdod (South Division)
- Maccabi Bnei Reineh (North Division)

Relegated from Premier League

- Bnei Yehuda Tel Aviv
- Hapoel Kfar Saba

=== From Liga Leumit ===
Promoted to Premier League

- Hapoel Nof HaGalil
- Hapoel Jerusalem

Relegated to Liga Alef

- Hapoel Iksal
- Hapoel Kfar Shalem

== Overview ==
=== Stadions and locations ===
| Club | Home City | Stadium | Capacity |
|---|---|---|---|
| Beitar Tel Aviv Bat Yam | Tel Aviv and Bat Yam | Ness Ziona Stadium^{[A]} | 3,500 |
| Bnei Yehuda Tel Aviv | Tel Aviv | Bloomfield Stadium | 29,400 |
| F.C. Kafr Qasim | Kafr Qasim | Lod Municipal Stadium^{[A]} | 3,000 |
| Hapoel Acre | Acre | Acre Municipal Stadium | 5,000 |
| Hapoel Afula | Afula | Afula Illit Stadium | 3,000 |
| Hapoel Ashdod | Ashdod | Yud-Alef Stadium | 7,800 |
| Hapoel Kfar Saba | Kfar Saba | Levita Stadium | 5,800 |
| Hapoel Petah Tikva | Petah Tikva | HaMoshava Stadium | 11,500 |
| Hapoel Ra'anana | Ra'anana | Ramat Gan Stadium | 13,370 |
| Hapoel Ramat Gan | Ramat Gan | Ramat Gan Stadium | 13,370 |
| Hapoel Ramat HaSharon | Ramat HaSharon | Grundman Stadium | 4,300 |
| Hapoel Rishon LeZion | Rishon LeZion | Haberfeld Stadium | 6,000 |
| Hapoel Umm al-Fahm | Umm al-Fahm | HaShalom Stadium | 7,000 |
| Maccabi Ahi Nazareth | Nazareth | Ilut Stadium | 4,932 |
| Maccabi Bnei Reineh | Reineh | Ilut Stadium | 4,932 |
| Sektzia Ness Ziona | Ness Ziona | Ness Ziona Stadium | 3,500 |

^AThe club is playing their home games at a neutral venue because their own ground does not meet league requirements.

== Standings ==
| Pos | Team | Pld | W | D | L | GF | GA | GD | Pts | Qualification or relegation |
|---|---|---|---|---|---|---|---|---|---|---|
| 1 | Maccabi Bnei Reineh | 30 | 14 | 9 | 7 | 34 | 23 | +11 | 51 | Qualification for the Promotion playoffs |
| 2 | F.C. Kafr Qasim | 30 | 13 | 11 | 6 | 40 | 28 | +12 | 50 | Qualification for the Promotion playoffs |
| 3 | Sektzia Ness Ziona | 30 | 11 | 12 | 7 | 44 | 32 | +12 | 45 | Qualification for the Promotion playoffs |
| 4 | Hapoel Petah Tikva | 30 | 11 | 11 | 8 | 26 | 25 | +1 | 44 | Qualification for the Promotion playoffs |
| 5 | Hapoel Ashdod (Note: A.S. Ashdod were deducted 1 points) | 30 | 10 | 14 | 6 | 36 | 29 | +7 | 43 | Qualification for the Promotion playoffs |
| 6 | Hapoel Kfar Saba | 30 | 10 | 12 | 8 | 39 | 32 | +7 | 42 | Qualification for the Promotion playoffs |
| 7 | Hapoel Umm al-Fahm | 30 | 9 | 12 | 9 | 36 | 36 | 0 | 39 | Qualification for the Promotion playoffs |
| 8 | Bnei Yehuda | 30 | 9 | 11 | 10 | 34 | 30 | +4 | 38 | Qualification for the Promotion playoffs |
| 9 | Hapoel Rishon LeZion | 30 | 10 | 8 | 12 | 37 | 38 | −1 | 38 | Qualification for the Relegation playoffs |
| 10 | Hapoel Ramat HaSharon | 30 | 8 | 13 | 9 | 34 | 36 | −2 | 37 | Qualification for the Relegation playoffs |
| 11 | Hapoel Ramat Gan | 30 | 8 | 13 | 9 | 34 | 39 | −5 | 37 | Qualification for the Relegation playoffs |
| 12 | Hapoel Afula | 30 | 11 | 4 | 15 | 33 | 52 | −19 | 37 | Qualification for the Relegation playoffs |
| 13 | Maccabi Ahi Nazareth | 30 | 9 | 9 | 12 | 28 | 39 | −11 | 36 | Qualification for the Relegation playoffs |
| 14 | Hapoel Acre | 30 | 7 | 14 | 9 | 33 | 27 | +6 | 35 | Qualification for the Relegation playoffs |
| 15 | Hapoel Ra'anana | 30 | 8 | 10 | 12 | 31 | 39 | −8 | 34 | Qualification for the Relegation playoffs |
| 16 | Beitar Tel Aviv Bat Yam | 30 | 5 | 11 | 14 | 31 | 45 | −14 | 26 | Qualification for the Relegation playoffs |

Updated to match(es) played on unknown. Source:
Rules for classification: 1) points; 2) goal difference; 3) number of wins; 4) goals scored; 5) head to head; 6) deciding match.

== Results ==
| Home \ Away | BTB | BNY | FKQ | HAC | HAF | HAD | HKS | HPT | HRA | HRG | HRS | HRL | HUF | MAN | MBR | SNZ |
|---|---|---|---|---|---|---|---|---|---|---|---|---|---|---|---|---|
| Beitar Tel Aviv Bat Yam | — | 1–3 | | | | 0–0 | | | 1–2 | | | 1–3 | 0–0 | | | |
| Bnei Yehuda | | — | | | 5–0 | | 0–1 | | | 1–1 | | 2–4 | | | | |
| F.C. Kafr Qasim | | 3–2 | — | | | 3–1 | 2–2 | | | | | | | | 2–1 | 2–0 |
| Hapoel Acre | | | 0–0 | — | 1–2 | | 0–1 | 1–0 | | | | | | 3–1 | | 1–1 |
| Hapoel Afula | 0–1 | | | | — | | 1–0 | 0–0 | | | 1–1 | 2–2 | | | 0–2 | |
| Hapoel Ashdod | | 0–0 | | 1–1 | | — | | | | 5–1 | | 2–1 | | | | |
| Hapoel Kfar Saba | 1–1 | | | 0–3 | | 2–0 | — | 0–0 | | | | | | | 1–1 | |
| Hapoel Petah Tikva | | 2–1 | | | | 0–1 | | — | 1–0 | | 0–2 | | 0–0 | | | |
| Hapoel Ra'anana | | 0–3 | | 1–3 | | | | | — | 3–4 | | 0–1 | | 0–0 | | |
| Hapoel Ramat Gan | | | | | 1–1 | | 1–2 | | | — | | | | 1–1 | 1–1 | 1–3 |
| Hapoel Ramat HaSharon | | | 1–0 | | | 1–1 | | | 0–0 | 1–1 | — | | 0–0 | | | |
| Hapoel Rishon LeZion | | | 1–2 | | 3–2 | | 1–4 | | | | | — | | | 1–1 | 1–1 |
| Hapoel Umm al-Fahm | | | 0–0 | 4–3 | | | | | 2–1 | 2–1 | | | — | 3–1 | | |
| Maccabi Ahi Nazareth | 4–2 | | 0–0 | | 2–1 | | | 0–0 | | | 0–4 | | | — | | 3–0 |
| Maccabi Bnei Reineh | 4–1 | 0–0 | | | | 0–0 | | | | | | | | | — | 2–0 |
| Sektzia Ness Ziona | 2–1 | | | | | | | 1–0 | | | 2–0 | | 1–1 | | 2–0 | — |

Updated to match(es) played on complete source="Ligat Leumit – Matches".. Source:
Legend: Blue = home team win; Yellow = draw; Red = away team win.

== Position by round ==
| Team ╲ Round | 1 | 2 | 3 | 4 | 5 | 6 | 7 | 8 | 9 | 10 | 11 | 12 | 13 | 14 | 15 | 16 | 17 | 18 | 19 | 20 | 21 | 22 | 23 | 24 | 25 | 26 | 27 | 28 | 29 | 30 |
|---|---|---|---|---|---|---|---|---|---|---|---|---|---|---|---|---|---|---|---|---|---|---|---|---|---|---|---|---|---|---|
| Maccabi Bnei Reineh | 10 | 2 | 4 | | | | | | | | | | | | | | | | | | | | | | | | | | | |
| F.C. Kafr Qasim | 2 | 1 | 2 | | | | | | | | | | | | | | | | | | | | | | | | | | | |
| Sektzia Ness Ziona | 15 | 15 | 15 | | | | | | | | | | | | | | | | | | | | | | | | | | | |
| Hapoel Petah Tikva | 4 | 4 | 9 | | | | | | | | | | | | | | | | | | | | | | | | | | | |
| Hapoel Kfar Saba | 6 | 6 | 3 | | | | | | | | | | | | | | | | | | | | | | | | | | | |
| Hapoel Ashdod | 7 | 8 | 5 | | | | | | | | | | | | | | | | | | | | | | | | | | | |
| Hapoel Umm al-Fahm | 3 | 3 | 6 | | | | | | | | | | | | | | | | | | | | | | | | | | | |
| Bnei Yehuda Tel Aviv | 11 | 11 | 7 | | | | | | | | | | | | | | | | | | | | | | | | | | | |
| Hapoel Ramat Gan | 9 | 10 | 12 | | | | | | | | | | | | | | | | | | | | | | | | | | | |
| Maccabi Ahi Nazareth | 5 | 5 | 1 | | | | | | | | | | | | | | | | | | | | | | | | | | | |
| Hapoel Ramat HaSharon | 8 | 9 | 11 | | | | | | | | | | | | | | | | | | | | | | | | | | | |
| Hapoel Afula | 12 | 12 | 9 | | | | | | | | | | | | | | | | | | | | | | | | | | | |
| Hapoel Acre | 14 | 13 | 14 | | | | | | | | | | | | | | | | | | | | | | | | | | | |
| Hapoel Rishon LeZion | 1 | 7 | 8 | | | | | | | | | | | | | | | | | | | | | | | | | | | |
| Hapoel Ra'anana | 13 | 14 | 13 | | | | | | | | | | | | | | | | | | | | | | | | | | | |
| Beitar Tel Aviv Bat Yam | 16 | 16 | 16 | | | | | | | | | | | | | | | | | | | | | | | | | | | |

== Promotion playoffs ==
| Pos | Team | Pld | W | D | L | GF | GA | GD | Pts | Qualification or relegation | MBR | SNZ | FKQ | HAD | HPT | HKS | HUF | BnY |
|---|---|---|---|---|---|---|---|---|---|---|---|---|---|---|---|---|---|---|
| 1 | Maccabi Bnei Reineh (C, P) | 37 | 18 | 10 | 9 | 43 | 28 | +15 | 64 | Promoted to Israeli Premier League | — | | | | | | | |
| 2 | Sektzia Ness Ziona (P) | 37 | 16 | 13 | 8 | 59 | 39 | +20 | 61 | Promoted to Israeli Premier League | | — | | | | | | |
| 3 | F.C. Kafr Qasim | 37 | 16 | 13 | 8 | 51 | 35 | +16 | 61 | | | | — | | | | | |
| 4 | A.S. Ashdod (Note: A.S. Ashdod were deducted 1 points) | 37 | 13 | 16 | 8 | 48 | 41 | +7 | 54 | | | | | — | | | | |
| 5 | Hapoel Petah Tikva | 37 | 14 | 12 | 11 | 36 | 35 | +1 | 54 | | | | | | — | | | |
| 6 | Hapoel Kfar Saba | 37 | 13 | 13 | 11 | 51 | 44 | +7 | 52 | | | | | | | — | | |
| 7 | Hapoel Umm al-Fahm | 37 | 10 | 13 | 14 | 47 | 54 | −7 | 43 | | | | | | | | — | |
| 8 | Bnei Yehuda Tel Aviv | 37 | 10 | 12 | 15 | 41 | 47 | −6 | 42 | | | | | | | | | — |

Source: Soccerway
Legend: Blue = home team win; Yellow = draw; Red = away team win.
Rules for classification: 1) points; 2) goal difference; 3) number of wins; 4) goals scored; 5) head to head; 6) deciding match.
(C) Champions; (P) Promoted

== Relegation playoffs ==
| Pos | Team | Pld | W | D | L | GF | GA | GD | Pts | Qualification or relegation | MAN | HAF | HAC | HRG | HRS | HRL | HRA | BTB |
|---|---|---|---|---|---|---|---|---|---|---|---|---|---|---|---|---|---|---|
| 9 | Maccabi Ahi Nazareth | 37 | 13 | 11 | 13 | 41 | 45 | −4 | 50 | | — | | | | | | | |
| 10 | Hapoel Afula | 37 | 13 | 8 | 16 | 39 | 57 | −18 | 47 | | | — | | | | | | |
| 11 | Hapoel Acre | 37 | 10 | 16 | 11 | 38 | 34 | +4 | 46 | | | | — | | | | | |
| 12 | Hapoel Ramat Gan | 37 | 10 | 16 | 11 | 43 | 47 | −4 | 46 | | | | | — | | | | |
| 13 | Hapoel Ramat HaSharon | 37 | 9 | 18 | 10 | 39 | 40 | −1 | 45 | | | | | | — | | | |
| 14 | Hapoel Rishon LeZion (Q) | 37 | 11 | 10 | 16 | 42 | 46 | −4 | 43 | Qualification for the Promotion/relegation playoff | | | | | | — | | |
| 15 | Hapoel Ra'anana (R) | 37 | 10 | 12 | 15 | 40 | 50 | −10 | 42 | Relegated to Liga Alef | | | | | | | — | |
| 16 | Beitar Tel Aviv Bat Yam (R) | 37 | 6 | 15 | 16 | 39 | 55 | −16 | 33 | Relegated to Liga Alef | | | | | | | | — |

Source: Soccerway
Legend: Blue = home team win; Yellow = draw; Red = away team win.
Rules for classification: 1) points; 2) goal difference; 3) number of wins; 4) goals scored; 5) head to head; 6) deciding match.
(Q) Qualified for the phase indicated; (R) Relegated

== Promotion/relegation playoff ==
The 14th-placed team faced 2021–22 Liga Alef promotion play-offs winner in a one game.

11 May 2022
19:40

| Hapoel Rishon LeZion | 3–1 | Hapoel Kfar Shalem |
|---|---|---|
| | Report |

Netanya Stadium

== See also ==
- Toto Cup Leumit
