= Enis Alushi =

Footballer (born 1985)

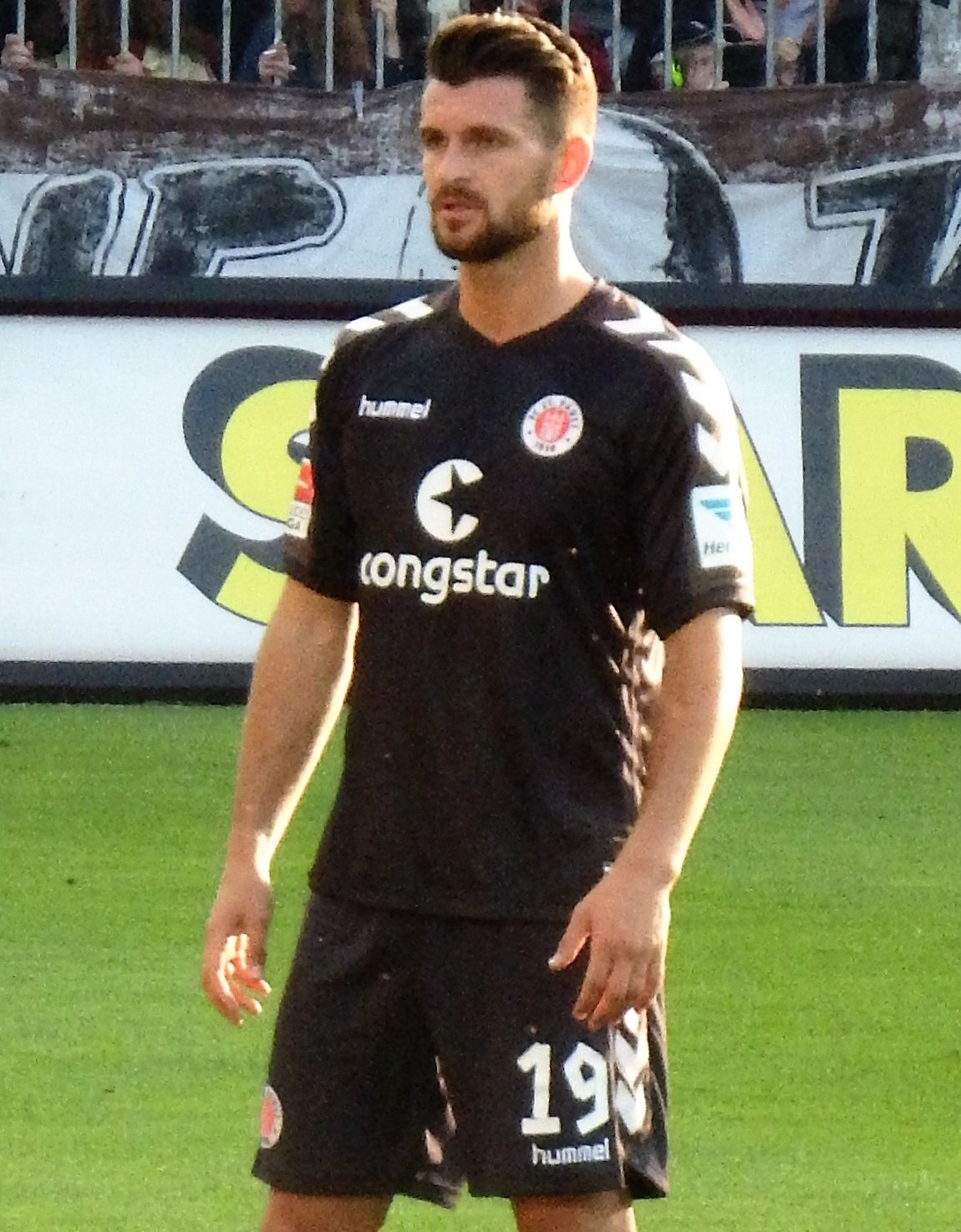
- Alushi with FC St. Pauli in 2015

Personal information
- Date of birth: 22 December 1985 (age 40)
- Place of birth: Titova Mitrovica, SFR Yugoslavia
- Height: 1.80 m (5 ft 11 in)
- Position: Midfielder

Youth career
- 1992–1994: TV Oberhundem
- 1995–1998: Borussia Dortmund
- 1998–2003: Sportfreunde Siegen
- 2003–2004: 1. FC Köln

Senior career*
Years	Team	Apps	(Gls)
2004–2006	1. FC Köln II	70	(5)
2006–2007	1. FC Köln	1	(0)
2007	→ SV Wehen Wiesbaden (loan)	8	(0)
2007–2008	SV Wehen Wiesbaden	5	(0)
2007–2008	→ SV Wehen Wiesbaden II	19	(4)
2008–2012	SC Paderborn	131	(5)
2012–2014	1. FC Kaiserslautern	18	(1)
2013	→ 1. FC Kaiserslautern II	3	(0)
2014–2016	FC St. Pauli	44	(2)
2016–2018	1. FC Nürnberg	5	(0)
2017	1. FC Nürnberg II	1	(0)
2017	→ Maccabi Haifa (loan)	12	(0)
Total		317	(17)

International career
2004	Germany U19	5	(1)
2005–2006	Germany U20	10	(0)
2014–2017	Kosovo	10	(0)
- * Club domestic league appearances and goals

Enis Alushi (born 22 December 1985) is a Kosovan former professional footballer who played as a midfielder. Alushi currently serves as Sporting Managing Director of German football club BFC Dynamo.

== Club career ==
=== 1. FC Nürnberg ===
On 28 July 2016, Alushi joined 2. Bundesliga side 1. FC Nürnberg. His debut with 1. FC Nürnberg came on 6 August in first matchday of 2016–17 2. Bundesliga against Dynamo Dresden, starting the match before being substituted off in the last minute for Even Hovland.

==== Loan at Maccabi Haifa ====
On 17 January 2017, Alushi joined Israeli Premier League side Maccabi Haifa, on a five-month-long loan. On 30 January 2017, he made his debut in a 2–2 home draw against Maccabi Tel Aviv after being named in the starting line-up.

==== Return from loan ====
On 5 August 2017, Alushi after return from loan made his debut with reserve team in a 4–0 home win against FC Pipinsried, starting the match before being substituted off in the 74th minute for Issaka Mouhaman. On 19 May 2018, it was confirmed that Alushi had left 1. FC Nürnberg.

=== Retirement ===
On 17 June 2019, his wife, Fatmire Alushi, via a photo on their official Instagram account announced the retirement of Enis and the starting the work as football agent.

== International career ==
=== Kosovo ===
On 2 March 2014, Alushi received a call-up from Kosovo for the first permitted by FIFA match against Haiti and made his debut after being named in the starting line-up.

== Managerial career ==
Alushi was announced as Sporting Managing Director of German football club BFC Dynamo on 6 January 2025. As such, he succeeded BFC Dynamo Sporting Director Angelo Vier, who would not extend his contract after the 2024–25 season. The two would together during the second half of the 2024–25, to achieve "a seamless transition". The role of sporting managing director was new in the club and was appointed as part of a restructuring of the club's sports management. As Sporting Managing Director, Alushi would take responsibility for all sporting matters in the club.

== Personal life ==
Alushi was born in Mitrovica, SFR Yugoslavia to Kosovo Albanian parents. In June 2011, he began dating fellow footballer Fatmire Bajramaj and the couple announced its engagement the following year. Shortly after, in September 2012, both suffered anterior cruciate ligament injuries in matches within 72 hours of each other. The couple got married in December 2013.

== Career statistics ==
=== Club ===
Appearances and goals by club, season and competition
Club	Season	League			Cup		Other		Total	
Club	Season	Division	Apps	Goals	Apps	Goals	Apps	Goals	Apps	Goals
1. FC Köln II	2003–04	Regionalliga Nord	3	0	0	0	—		3	0
1. FC Köln II	2004–05	Regionalliga Nord	23	1	1	0	—		24	1
1. FC Köln II	2005–06	Regionalliga Nord	29	3	1	0	—		30	3
1. FC Köln II	2006–07	Oberliga Nordrhein	15	1	0	0	—		15	1
1. FC Köln II	Total		70	5	2	0	—		72	5
1. FC Köln	2006–07	2. Bundesliga	1	0	0	0	—		1	0
SV Wehen Wiesbaden	2006–07 (loan)	Regionalliga Süd	8	0	0	0	—		8	0
SV Wehen Wiesbaden	2007–08	2. Bundesliga	5	0	0	0	–		5	0
SV Wehen Wiesbaden II	2007–08	Oberliga Hessen	19	4	–		–		19	4
SC Paderborn	2008–09	3. Liga	32	0	0	0	2 (Note: Two appearances in 2008–09 2. Bundesliga relegation play-offs)	0	34	0
SC Paderborn	2009–10	2. Bundesliga	33	3	0	0	—		33	3
SC Paderborn	2010–11	2. Bundesliga	34	0	1	0	—		35	0
SC Paderborn	2011–12	2. Bundesliga	32	2	2	2	—		34	4
SC Paderborn	Total		131	5	3	2	2	0	136	7
1. FC Kaiserslautern	2012–13	2. Bundesliga	7	0	1	0	—		8	0
1. FC Kaiserslautern	2013–14	2. Bundesliga	11	1	2	0	–		13	1
1. FC Kaiserslautern	Total		18	1	3	0	0	0	21	1
1. FC Kaiserslautern II	2013–14	Regionalliga Südwest	3	0	–		–		3	0
FC St. Pauli	2014–15	2. Bundesliga	18	1	0	0	—		18	1
FC St. Pauli	2015–16	2. Bundesliga	26	1	1	0	—		27	1
FC St. Pauli	Total		44	2	1	0	—		45	2
1. FC Nürnberg	2016–17	2. Bundesliga	5	0	1	0	—		6	0
1. FC Nürnberg	2017–18	2. Bundesliga	0	0	0	0	1	0	1	0
1. FC Nürnberg	Total		5	0	1	0	1	0	7	0
1. FC Nürnberg II	2017–18	Regionalliga Bayern	1	0	–		–		1	0
Maccabi Haifa (loan)	2016–17	Israeli Premier League	12	0	0	0	—		12	0
Career total			317	17	10	2	3	0	330	19

=== International ===
Appearances and goals by national team and year
National team	Year	Apps	Goals
Kosovo	2014	3	0
Kosovo	2015	1	0
Kosovo	2016	3	0
Kosovo	2017	3	0
Total		10	0
