= Fitim Azemi =

Norwegian footballer (born 1992)

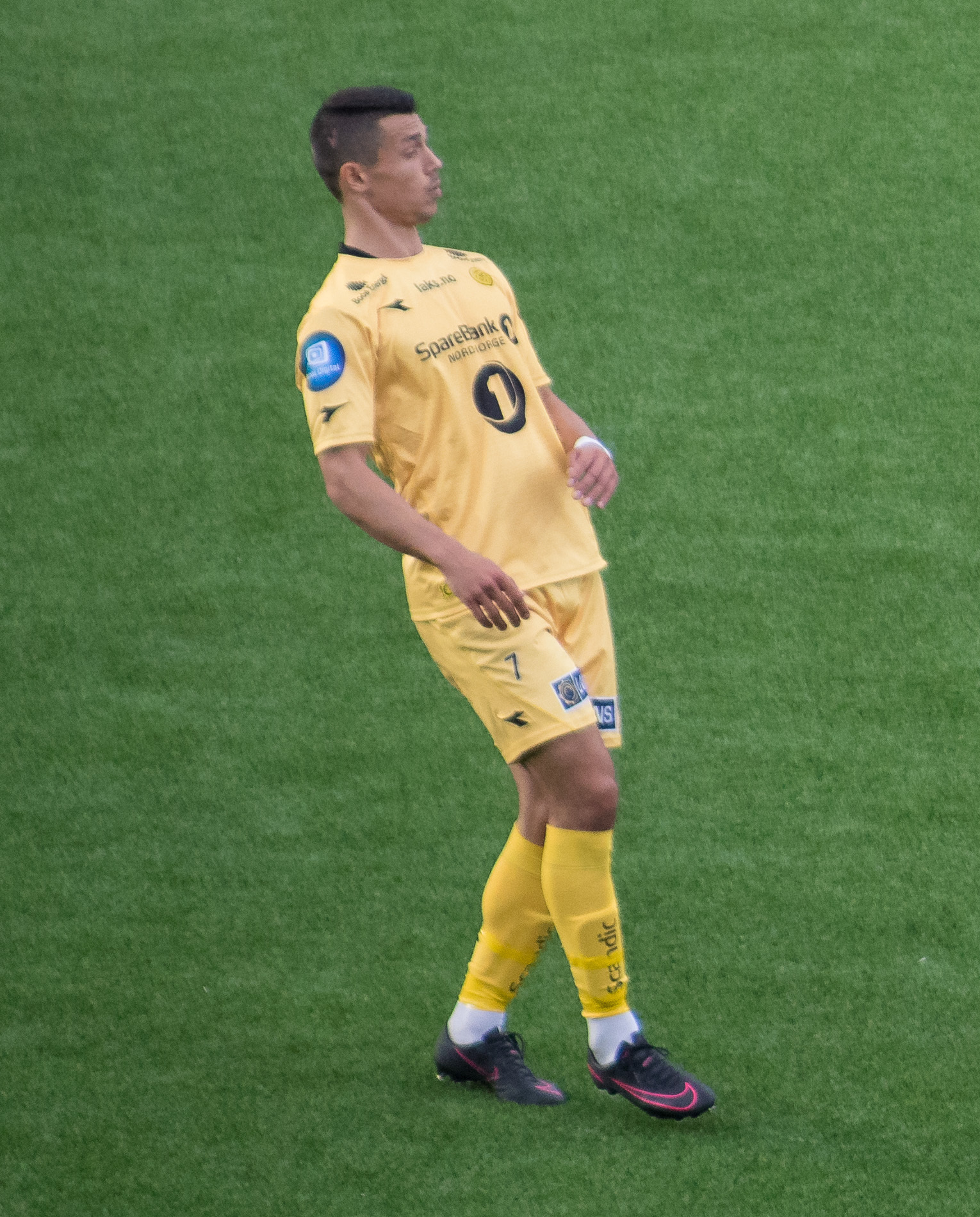
- Fitim Azemi playing for Bodø/Glimt

Personal information
- Date of birth: 25 June 1992 (age 34)
- Place of birth: Oslo, Norway
- Height: 1.80 m (5 ft 11 in)
- Position: Striker

Team information
- Current team: Ullern
- Number: 77

Youth career
- –2007: Ski
- 2007: Kråkstad
- 2008: Ås (no)
- 2008–2011: Follo

Senior career*
Years	Team	Apps	(Gls)
2011–2014	Follo	81	(46)
2015–2017	Bodø/Glimt	59	(15)
2017	Maccabi Haifa	8	(0)
2017–2020	Vålerenga	21	(0)
2018	→ Sandefjord (loan)	5	(0)
2019	→ Tromsø (loan)	12	(5)
2020–2022	Stabæk	48	(7)
2020	→ Tromsø (loan)	24	(7)
2023–	Ullern	15	(8)
- * Club domestic league appearances and goals as of 1 December 2023

Fitim Azemi (born 25 June 1992) is a Norwegian footballer who currently plays for Ullern.

Azemi scored 31 goals for Follo in the 2014 2. divisjon. He made his senior debut for Bodø/Glimt in the first league round of the 2015 Tippeligaen.

== Career statistics ==
=== Club ===
As of match played 29 October 2022

Appearances and goals by club, season and competition
Club	Season	League			National Cup (Note: All appearances in the Norwegian Football Cup)		Europe		Total	
Club	Season	Division	Apps	Goals	Apps	Goals	Apps	Goals	Apps	Goals
Follo	2011	2. divisjon	4	0	1	0	—		5	0
Follo	2012	2. divisjon	24	5	1	0	—		25	5
Follo	2013	1. divisjon	29	10	3	0	—		32	10
Follo	2014	2. divisjon	24	31	3	1	—		27	32
Follo	Total		81	46	8	1	—		89	47
Bodø/Glimt	2015	Tippeligaen	30	4	3	5	—		33	9
Bodø/Glimt	2016	Tippeligaen	29	11	6	3	—		35	14
Bodø/Glimt	Total		59	15	9	8	—		68	23
Maccabi Haifa	2016–17	Israeli Premier League	8	0	0	0	—		8	0
Maccabi Haifa	Total		8	0	0	0	—		8	0
Vålerenga	2017	Eliteserien	7	0	1	0	—		8	0
Vålerenga	2018	Eliteserien	3	0	1	2	—		4	2
Vålerenga	2019	Eliteserien	11	0	2	2	—		13	2
Vålerenga	Total		21	0	4	4	—		25	4
Sandefjord (loan)	2018	Eliteserien	5	0	0	0	—		5	0
Sandefjord (loan)	Total		5	0	0	0	—		5	0
Tromsø (loan)	2019	Eliteserien	12	5	0	0	—		12	5
Tromsø (loan)	2020	1. divisjon	24	7	0	0	—		24	7
Tromsø (loan)	Total		36	12	0	0	—		36	12
Stabæk	2021	Eliteserien	19	2	2	0	—		21	2
Stabæk	2022	1. divisjon	29	5	2	2	—		31	7
Stabæk	Total		48	7	4	2	—		52	9
Career total			258	80	25	15	0	0	284	95
