= Firas Mugrabi =

Israeli footballer

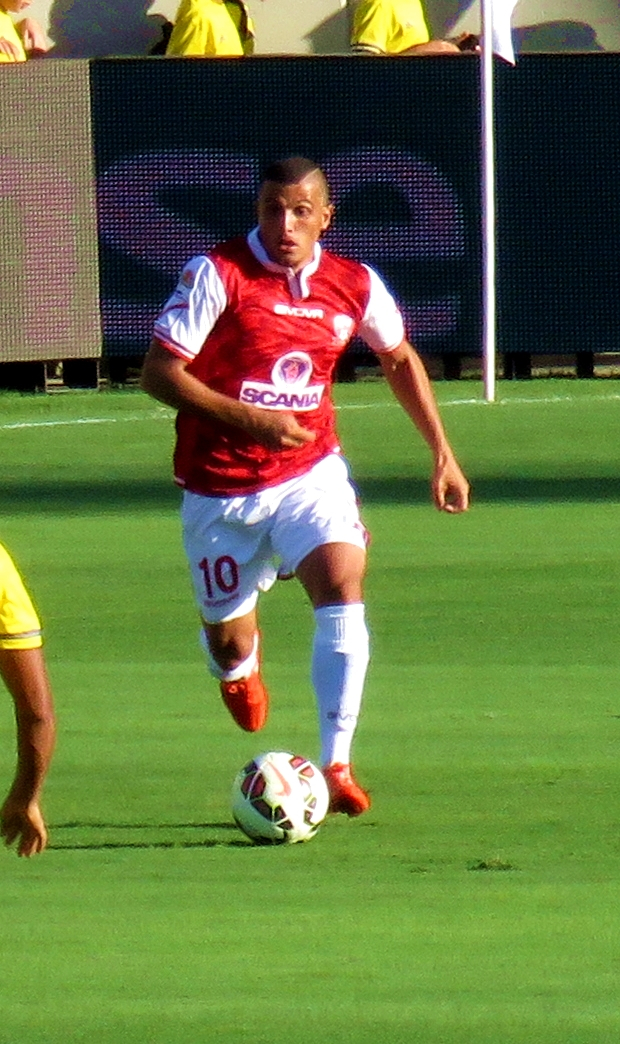
- Mugrabi playing for Bnei Sakhnin in 2015

Personal information
- Full name: Firas Mugrabi
- Date of birth: 24 July 1991 (age 35)
- Place of birth: Shefa-'Amr, Israel
- Height: 1.72 m (5 ft 7 1/2 in)
- Position: Attacking midfielder

Team information
- Current team: Ihud Bnei Shefa-'Amr (manager)

Youth career
- 1998–2006: Maccabi Haifa
- 2006–2009: Maccabi Netanya

Senior career*
Years	Team	Apps	(Gls)
2008–2012	Maccabi Netanya	96	(8)
2012–2013	Lens	1	(0)
2013	→ Maccabi Netanya (loan)	16	(1)
2013–2016	Bnei Sakhnin	93	(19)
2016–2017	Maccabi Haifa	11	(0)
2017–2020	Bnei Sakhnin	71	(17)
2020–2021	Ihud Bnei Shefa-'Amr	6	(4)

International career
2007–2008	Israel U17	7	(2)
2008–2009	Israel U18	5	(0)
2010–2012	Israel U21	6	(0)

Managerial career
- 2021–2024: Ihud Bnei Shefa-'Amr
- * Club domestic league appearances and goals

Firas Mugrabi (Arabic: فراس مغربي, Hebrew: פיראס מוגרבי; born 24 July 1991) is a former Israeli footballer who plays as an attacking midfielder for.

== Career ==
On 12 November 2008, Mugrabi made his debut for the senior side of Maccabi Netanya in the Toto Cup, scoring the second goal in a 2–0 victory over Beitar Jerusalem. In 4 seasons with Netanya he played 121 games, scored 13 goals and also made 20 assists.

On 31 August 2012, he moved to RC Lens for a fee of €400,000 and a three-year contract worth approximately €450,000.

In January 2013, he was loaned back to Maccabi Netanya, as he said, " I would love to come back to Maccabi Netanya and help them stay in the first division". However, at the end of the season the team was relegated to the second division with Reuven Atar as their coach and Mugrabi returned to Lens due to his contract.

On 20 July 2013, Mugrabi was officially released from his contract with RC Lens, saying the team reached a full understanding of his situation and gave him the freedom to search for another club to play in.

On 5 June 2016, Firas Mugrabi officially signed a one-year contract with Maccabi Haifa, saying that he has finally achieved his childhood dream.

On 3 January 2017, Mugrabi signed a 3.5-year contract with Bnei Sakhnin.

On 5 August 2020, Mugrabi signed in Ihud Bnei Shefa-'Amr. In the next summer, Mugrabi appointed team coach.

== International career ==
Mugrabi received his first call-up to the senior national team squad on 31 August 2016, for a 2018 FIFA World Cup qualifier against Italy.

== Career statistics ==
As of 21 April 2016

Appearances and goals by club, season and competition
Club	Season	League		Cup		Toto Cup		Europe		Total	
Club	Season	Apps	Goals	Apps	Goals	Apps	Goals	Apps	Goals	Apps	Goals
Maccabi Netanya	2008–09	1	0	0	0	2	1	0	0	3	1
Maccabi Netanya	2009–10	26	0	1	0	5	0	2	0	34	0
Maccabi Netanya	2010–11	32	3	4	2	5	2	0	0	41	7
Maccabi Netanya	2011–12	37	5	3	0	3	0	0	0	43	5
Lens	2012–13	1	0	0	0	0	0	0	0	1	0
Maccabi Netanya (on loan)	2012–13	16	1	1	0	0	0	0	0	17	1
Bnei Sakhnin	2013–14	34	3	1	1	0	0	0	0	35	4
Bnei Sakhnin	2014–15	31	9	0	0	6	1	0	0	37	10
Bnei Sakhnin	2015–16	33	9	5	2	4	1	0	0	42	12
Maccabi Haifa	2016–17	11	0	1	0	6	4	2	0	20	4
Bnei Sakhnin	2016–17	20	2	1	0	0	0	0	0	21	2
Bnei Sakhnin	2017–18	31	9	1	0	4	0	0	0	36	9
Bnei Sakhnin	2018–19	10	3	0	0	5	0	0	0	15	3
Bnei Sakhnin	2019–20	11	3	2	1	0	0	0	0	13	4
Ihud Bnei Shefa-'Amr	2020–21	6	4	0	0	0	0	0	0	6	4
Career total		300	51	20	6	40	9	4	0	364	68
