= Haim Messika =

Israeli footballer

Personal information
- Full name: Haim Messika
- Date of birth: 1961 (age 64–65)
- Place of birth: Netanya, Israel
- Position: Midfielder

Youth career
- Maccabi Netanya

Senior career*
Years	Team	Apps	(Gls)
1979–1987	Maccabi Netanya		(5)
1983–1984	→ Maccabi Ramat Amidar (loan)		(2)
1985–1986	→ Hapoel Kfar Saba (loan)		(1)
1987–1988	Hapoel Bat Yam		
- Maccabi Sha'arayim
- Beitar Netanya

International career
	Israel U-19	12	(0)
- * Club domestic league appearances and goals

Haim Messika (Hebrew: חיים מסיקה) is a former Israeli footballer who played in Maccabi Netanya and Hapoel Kfar Saba. He is the father of Reef Messika, also a footballer who plays for Hapoel Kfar Saba in Liga Leumit.

== Honours ==
- Israeli Premier League (1):
  - 1982-83
