= Sammy Elyakim =

Israeli footballer

Sammy Elyakim סמי אליקים
Personal information
- Full name: Sammy Elyakim
- Date of birth: March 30, 1987 (age 39)
- Place of birth: Kfar Saba, Israel
- Height: 1.73 m (5 ft 8 in)
- Position: Left back

Youth career
- Hapoel Kfar Saba

Senior career*
Years	Team	Apps	(Gls)
2006–2007	Hapoel Kfar Saba	4	(0)
2007–2009	Beitar Shimshon Tel Aviv	31	(1)
2009–2012	Hapoel Kfar Saba	74	(0)
2011	→ Hapoel Ramat HaSharon	1	(0)
2012–2013	Körfez KF	5	(0)
2013	Hapoel Ra'anana	2	(0)
2013–2017	Hapoel Kfar Saba	84	(2)
- * Club domestic league appearances and goals

Sammy Elyakim (Hebrew: סמי אליקים; born 30 March 1987, in Israel) is a former Israeli professional footballer who plays as a left defender.

== Career ==
Elyakim grew up in the youth department and played for the first team of Hapoel Kfar Saba. He also played in his career at Beitar Tel Aviv Ramla at the third division. He made his only debate in the Israeli Premier League in September 2011, with Ironi Nir Ramat HaSharon against F.C. Ashdod. He moved to play at the TFF Second League in Turkey, when he signed at Körfez KF in August 2012. he returned to Israel at January 2013, by signing at Hapoel Ra'anana from the Second Division.
