= Kamil Vacek =

Czech footballer (born 1987)

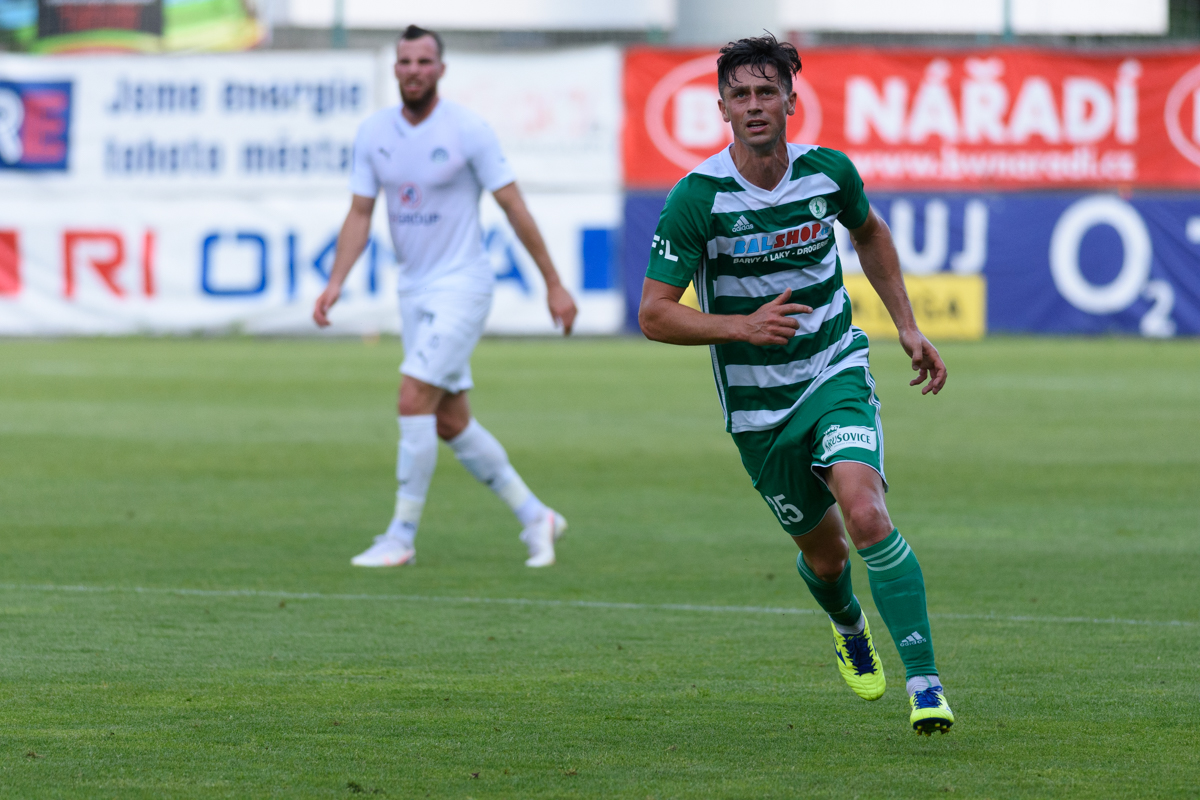
- Vacek with Bohemians 1905 in 2020

Personal information
- Date of birth: 18 May 1987 (age 39)
- Place of birth: Ústí nad Orlicí, Czechoslovakia
- Height: 1.84 m (6 ft 0 in)
- Position: Midfielder

Youth career
- 1993–1998: Sokol Dolní Dobrouč
- 1998–1999: FC Rychnov nad Kněžnou
- 1999–2005: Sigma Olomouc

Senior career*
Years	Team	Apps	(Gls)
2005–2007	Sigma Olomouc	9	(0)
2006–2007	→ Arminia Bielefeld (loan)	1	(0)
2007–2011	Sparta Prague	83	(10)
2011–2013	ChievoVerona	31	(1)
2013–2016	Sparta Prague	30	(1)
2015	→ Mladá Boleslav (loan)	13	(0)
2015–2016	→ Piast Gliwice (loan)	33	(5)
2016–2017	Maccabi Haifa	26	(0)
2017–2018	Śląsk Wrocław	25	(0)
2018–2019	Odense	2	(0)
2019	→ Bohemians 1905 (loan)	14	(1)
2019–2022	Bohemians 1905	38	(5)
2022–2026	Pardubice	101	(4)
Total		406	(27)

International career
2002–2003	Czech Republic U16	13	(1)
2003–2004	Czech Republic U17	15	(2)
2004–2005	Czech Republic U18	11	(1)
2005–2006	Czech Republic U19	12	(2)
2007	Czech Republic U20	1	(0)
2008	Czech Republic U21	2	(0)
2011–2016	Czech Republic	9	(0)
- * Club domestic league appearances and goals

Kamil Vacek (born 18 May 1987) is a Czech former professional footballer who played as a midfielder. A former national team player for the Czech Republic, Vacek has played club football in numerous countries.

== Club career ==
=== Serie A ===
In 2011, Vacek signed for ChievoVerona making his Serie A debut on 11 September in a 2–2 draw against Novara. In the last matchday of 2011–12 Serie A, he scored his only goal in causing relegation to Serie B for Lecce.

In a match against Napoli on 28 October 2012, Vacek was sent off after two yellow cards. He returned to the Czech Republic in 2013.

=== Later career ===
On 30 August 2017, Vacek signed a contract with Śląsk Wrocław.

On 28 January 2019, Vacek returned to the Czech Republic and signed with Bohemians 1905 on a half-season loan from Danish club OB. During his loan period, Vacek played 14 times in the Czech First League, scoring once. The same year on 1 July, Odense Boldklub announced that his contract was terminated. He subsequently returned to Bohemians 1905, this time on as a permanent transfer, signing a three-year contract. In January 2022, Vacek joined fellow Czech First League side FK Pardubice, arriving during the winter break of the 2021–22 Czech First League. He ended his professional career after the 2025–26 season.

== International career ==
On 4 June 2011, Vacek debuted for the Czech Republic national team at the Kirin Cup in a goalless draw against Peru. He later came on as a substitute during a 4-1 friendly victory against Serbia. On 13 November 2015, Vacek also appeared in the starting line-up as a central midfielder in another friendly match against Poland, where the Czechs lost 3–1.

== Honours ==
Sparta Prague

- Czech First League: 2009–10, 2013–14
- Czech Cup: 2007–08, 2013–14
- Czech Supercup: 2010
