= 2020–21 Liga Alef =

Liga Alef
- Season: 2020–21
- Champions: Maccabi Bnei Reineh; Hapoel "Adumim" Ashdod

The 2020–21 Liga Alef season is the 12th season as third tier since its re-alignment in 2009 and the 54th season of third-tier football in Israel.

== Changes from last season ==
=== Team changes ===
- Hapoel Iksal and Hapoel Kfar Shalem were promoted to Liga Leumit; Hapoel Ashkelon and Hapoel Bnei Lod (both to South division) were relegated from Liga Leumit.
- Since the previous season was abandoned due to the COVID-19 pandemic, no team was relegated to Liga Bet. However Ironi Kiryat Gat and Hapoel Asi Gilboa folded and didn't register to this season.
- Maccabi Tzur Shalom and Maccabi Ironi Kiryat Ata merged in July 2020.
- Ihud Bnei Majd al-Krum, Hapoel Bu'eine, Hapoel Bnei Fureidis, Maccabi Bnei Reineh, Tzeirei Tayibe (to the North division), F.C. Dimona and Ironi Kuseife (to the South Division) were promoted from Liga Bet to complete a 34 team line-up, 18 teams in each division.

== Format change ==
To accommodate the shortened schedule caused by COVID-19 pandemic, the league was split into two phases. For the first phase each division was split to two sub-divisions with nine teams in each sub-division, to be played as a double round robin tournament (16 matches in total). At the end of the first phase in each division the two top teams from each sub-division qualifying to a promotion group of four teams, again to be played as a double round robin tournament (6 matches in total), with the winning team gaining promotion to Liga Leumit and the second-placed team qualifying to the promotion play-offs.
The seven bottom placed teams in each sub-division would continue in their respective sub-division with the points gained during the first phase, playing an additional round robin schedule (six matches in total). The bottom team in each sub-division would be relegated to Liga Bet and the sixth placed team would compete to the relegation play-offs.

== North Division ==
=== Sub-division A ===
Pos	Team	Pld	W	D	L	GF	GA	GD	Pts	Qualification or relegation
1	F.C. Tira	16	12	2	2	42	11	+31	38	Promotion group
2	Maccabi Tamra	16	9	4	3	16	13	+3	31	Promotion group
3	Hapoel Bu'eine	22	11	2	9	33	33	0	35	
4	Hapoel Herzliya	22	8	7	7	28	18	+10	31	
5	Maccabi Tzur Shalom Bialik	22	8	6	8	34	26	+8	30	
6	Hapoel Bnei Fureidis	22	8	6	8	32	30	+2	30	
7	Hapoel Kafr Kanna	22	8	6	8	32	33	−1	30	
8	Ironi Tiberias	22	7	6	9	24	22	+2	27	Relegation play-offs
9	Ihud Bnei Majd al-Krum	22	1	3	18	14	69	−55	6	Relegation to Liga Bet

Source: Liga Alef North IFA (in Hebrew)
Rules for classification: 1) points; 2) goal difference; 3) number of wins; 4) goals scored; 5) head to head; 6) deciding match.

=== Sub-division B ===
Pos	Team	Pld	W	D	L	GF	GA	GD	Pts	Qualification or relegation
1	Hapoel Kaukab	16	11	5	0	29	6	+23	38	Promotion group
2	Maccabi Bnei Reineh	16	7	6	3	23	16	+7	27	Promotion group
3	Hapoel Bnei Arara-'Ara	22	7	8	7	26	29	−3	29	
4	F.C. Haifa Robi Shapira	22	7	7	8	28	26	+2	28	
5	Hapoel Migdal HaEmek	22	6	10	6	28	35	−7	28	
6	Hapoel Baqa al-Gharbiyye	22	7	6	9	29	32	−3	27	
7	Hapoel Bnei Zalafa F.C.	22	7	6	9	35	39	−4	27	
8	Tzeirei Tayibe	22	5	11	6	30	31	−1	26	Relegation play-offs
9	F.C. Daburiyya	22	3	7	12	16	30	−14	16	Relegation to Liga Bet

Source: Liga Alef North IFA (in Hebrew)
Rules for classification: 1) points; 2) goal difference; 3) number of wins; 4) goals scored; 5) head to head; 6) deciding match.

=== Promotion group ===
Pos	Team	Pld	W	D	L	GF	GA	GD	Pts	Qualification or relegation
1	Maccabi Bnei Reineh	6	3	1	2	8	8	0	10	Promotion to Liga Leumit
2	F.C. Tira	6	2	3	1	6	4	+2	9	Promotion play-offs
3	Hapoel Kaukab	6	2	2	2	6	5	+1	8	
4	Maccabi Tamra	6	1	2	3	6	9	−3	5	

Source: Liga Alef North IFA (in Hebrew)
Rules for classification: 1) points; 2) goal difference; 3) number of wins; 4) goals scored; 5) head to head; 6) deciding match.

== South Division ==
=== Sub-division A ===
Pos	Team	Pld	W	D	L	GF	GA	GD	Pts	Qualification or relegation
1	F.C. Holon Yermiyahu	16	8	6	2	18	9	+9	30	Promotion group
2	Hapoel "Adumim" Ashdod	16	8	5	3	20	10	+10	29	Promotion group
3	Maccabi Herzliya	22	11	4	7	32	24	+8	37	
4	Shimshon Kafr Qasim	22	7	10	5	31	23	+8	31	
5	Maccabi Yavne	22	7	6	9	23	24	−1	27	
6	Hapoel Azor	22	7	6	9	27	31	−4	27	
7	F.C. Dimona	22	6	8	8	18	17	+1	26	
8	Hapoel Bnei Lod	22	6	5	11	27	36	−9	23	Relegation play-offs
9	F.C Or Yehuda	22	6	4	12	26	48	−22	22	Relegation to Liga Bet

Source: Liga Alef South IFA (in Hebrew)
Rules for classification: 1) points; 2) goal difference; 3) number of wins; 4) goals scored; 5) head to head; 6) deciding match.

==== Sub-division B ====
Pos	Team	Pld	W	D	L	GF	GA	GD	Pts	Qualification or relegation
1	Hapoel Bik'at HaYarden	16	9	5	2	32	14	+18	32	Promotion group
2	Maccabi Kabilio Jaffa	16	8	7	1	30	11	+19	31	Promotion group
3	Hapoel Marmorek	22	13	5	4	41	21	+20	44	
4	Maccabi Sha'arayim	22	8	7	7	26	27	−1	31	
5	Ironi Kuseife	22	6	8	8	22	35	−13	26	
6	Maccabi Ashdod	22	6	7	9	30	30	0	25	
7	Hapoel Ashkelon	22	5	10	7	21	26	−5	25	
8	Nordia Jerusalem	22	6	6	10	32	35	−3	24	Relegation play-offs
9	Hakoah Amidar Ramat Gan	22	2	5	15	23	58	−35	11	Relegation to Liga Bet

Source: Liga Alef South IFA (in Hebrew)
Rules for classification: 1) points; 2) goal difference; 3) number of wins; 4) goals scored; 5) head to head; 6) deciding match.

=== Promotion group ===
Pos	Team	Pld	W	D	L	GF	GA	GD	Pts	Qualification or relegation
1	Hapoel "Adumim" Ashdod	6	4	2	0	9	4	+5	14	Promotion to Liga Leumit
2	Maccabi Kabilio Jaffa	6	4	0	2	6	5	+1	12	Promotion play-offs
3	Hapoel Bik'at HaYarden	6	2	1	3	6	5	+1	7	
4	F.C. Holon Yermiyahu	6	0	1	5	4	11	−7	1	

Source: Liga Alef North IFA (in Hebrew)
Rules for classification: 1) points; 2) goal difference; 3) number of wins; 4) goals scored; 5) head to head; 6) deciding match.

== Promotion play-offs ==
In the first round of the play-offs the two second-placed teams from the promotion groups faced each other in a single match on neutral ground. The winner of the match faced the 14th-placed team from Liga Leumit in a single match.

=== First round ===
23 May 2021

F.C. Tira	1–1 (a.e.t.)	Maccabi Kabilio Jaffa
A. Malka 44'	IFA	90' (pen.) Beit Ya'akov
Penalties
Amasha (penalty scored); Haj Yahia (penalty missed); D. Malka (penalty missed)	1–4	(penalty scored) Volowelski; (penalty scored) Arzuan; (penalty scored) Eshel; (penalty scored) Beit Ya'akov

Ramat Gan Stadium
Referee: Idan Leiba

=== Second round ===
31 May 2021

Hapoel Umm Al-Fahm	1–0	Maccabi Kabilio Jaffa
Elimelech 21'	IFA

HaMoshava Stadium
Referee: Gal Leibovich

Maccabi Kabilio Jaffa was not promoted to Liga Leumit.

== Relegation play-offs ==
In each division (North and South) the sixth-placed teams from each sub-division played each other, with the winning team staying in Liga Alef. The losing team from each division faced the Liga Bet play-off winner in a single match for a place in Liga Alef.

=== North division ===
==== First round ====
15 June 2021
17:00

Ironi Tiberias	0–1	Tzeirei Taiybe
	IFA	47' Baraa

Tiberias Municipal Stadium
Referee: Idan Leiba

==== Second round ====
25 June 2021
16:00

Ironi Tiberias	w/o (1–0) (abandoned '90+7)	Ihud Bnei Shefa-'Amr
Mahfud (yellow card) 59'; Davidov 82'; Ben David (yellow card) 83'	IFA	(red card) 22' T. Diab; (yellow card) 22' (yellow-red card) 24' A. Diab; (yellow card) 80' (red card) 84' Khatib; (red card) 90+5' Nassar; (yellow card) 90+5' Shabal; (yellow card) 8' (red card) 90+7' Younes

Ilut Stadium
Referee: Avidad Shilo'ach

Ironi Tiberias was not relegated to Liga Bet.

=== South division ===
==== First round ====
3 June 2021
17:30

Nordia Jerusalem	0–1	Hapoel Bnei Lod
	IFA	12' Turiel

Har Homa Stadium
Referee: Roi Reinshreiber

==== Second round ====
29 June 2021
20:00

Nordia Jerusalem	1–0	Hapoel Mahane Yehuda
Cohen 18'	IFA

Haberfeld Stadium
Referee: Gal Leibovich

Nordia Jerusalem was not relegated to Liga Bet.
