= 2020–21 Liga Bet =

Liga Bet
- Season: 2020–21

The 2020–21 Liga Bet season is the 65th season of fourth-tier football in Israel.

== Changes from last season ==
=== Team changes ===
- The four division winners, Ihud Bnei Majd al-Krum, Hapoel Bnei Fureidis, Tzeirei Tayibe and F.C. Dimona were promoted to Liga Alef. Hapoel Bu'eine, Maccabi Bnei Reineh and Ironi Kuseife were also promoted to Liga Alef to fill empty vacancies.
- Since the previous season was abandoned due to the COVID-19 pandemic, no team was relegated to Liga Gimel. However Maccabi Bnei Nahf, Maccabi Ahva Yarka and Maccabi Umm al-Fahm folded and didn't register to this season.
- 18 teams from Liga Gimel were promoted from Liga Bet to complete a 72 team line-up, 18 teams in each division.

== Format change ==
To accommodate the shortened schedule caused by COVID-19 pandemic, the league was split into two phases. For the first phase each division was split to two sub-divisions with nine teams in each sub-division, to be played as a double round robin tournament (16 matches in total). At the end of the first phase in each division the two top teams from each sub-division qualifying to a promotion group of four teams, again to be played as a double round robin tournament (6 matches in total), with the winning team gaining promotion to Liga Alef and the second-placed team qualifying to the promotion play-offs.
The seven bottom placed teams in each sub-division would continue in their respective sub-division with the points gained during the first phase, playing an additional round robin schedule (six matches in total). The bottom team in each sub-division would be relegated to Liga Gimel and the sixth placed team would compete to the relegation play-offs.

== North A Division ==
=== Sub-division A ===
Pos	Team	Pld	W	D	L	GF	GA	GD	Pts	Qualification or relegation
1	Hapoel Karmiel	16	13	0	3	50	18	+32	39	Promotion group
2	Tzeirei Kafr Kanna	16	11	4	1	42	18	+24	37	Promotion group
3	Maccabi Ahva Sha'ab	22	10	6	6	33	20	+13	36	
4	Tzeirei Tamra	22	9	6	7	39	29	+10	33	
5	Hapoel Bnei Tuba-Zangariyye	22	8	5	9	29	38	−9	29	
6	Hapoel Arraba	22	8	6	8	31	29	+2	30	
7	Tzeirei Sakhnin	22	8	4	10	33	36	−3	28	
8	Sektzia Ma'alot	22	8	2	12	28	46	−18	26	Relegation play-offs
9	Hapoel Bnei Bir al-Maksur	22	1	1	20	14	65	−51	4	Relegation to Liga Gimel

Source: Liga Bet North A IFA (in Hebrew)
Rules for classification: 1) points; 2) number of wins; 3) head to head; 6) deciding match.

=== Sub-division B ===
Pos	Team	Pld	W	D	L	GF	GA	GD	Pts	Qualification or relegation
1	Ihud Bnei Shefa-'Amr	16	13	1	2	49	7	+42	40	Promotion group
2	Ahi Acre	16	9	0	7	30	24	+6	27	Promotion group
3	Bnei MMBE	22	10	5	7	42	24	+18	35 (Note: Bnei MMBE wins over Hapoel Safed in head-to-head (0–0;4–1;0–2).)	
4	Hapoel Safed	22	10	5	7	33	25	+8	35	
5	Ironi Bnei Kabul	22	10	4	8	47	29	+18	34 (Note: Ironi Bnei Kabul wins over Maccabi Yafa in head-to-head (3–1;1–2;2–1).)	
6	Maccabi Ironi Yafa	22	10	4	8	42	30	+12	34	
7	Beitar Nahariya	22	10	3	9	48	25	+23	33	
8	Ahva Kafr Manda	22	8	4	10	40	34	+6	28	Relegation play-offs
9	Al-Nahda Nazareth	22	0	0	22	3	136	−133	0	Relegation to Liga Gimel

Source: Liga Bet North A IFA (in Hebrew)
Rules for classification: 1) points; 2) number of wins; 3) head to head; 6) deciding match.

=== Promotion group ===
Pos	Team	Pld	W	D	L	GF	GA	GD	Pts	Qualification or relegation
1	Tzeirei Kafr Kanna	6	4	2	0	9	2	+7	14	Promotion to Liga Alef
2	Ihud Bnei Shefa-'Amr	6	4	1	1	15	6	+9	13	Promotion play-offs
3	Hapoel Karmiel	6	2	0	4	7	12	−5	6	
4	Ahi Acre	6	0	1	5	5	16	−11	1	

Source: Liga Bet North A IFA (in Hebrew)
Rules for classification: 1) points; 2) number of wins; 3) head to head; 6) deciding match.

== North B Division ==
=== Sub-division A ===
Pos	Team	Pld	W	D	L	GF	GA	GD	Pts	Qualification or relegation
1	Ironi Nesher	16	12	3	1	50	12	+38	39	Promotion group
2	F.C. Tirat Carmel	16	10	3	3	49	21	+28	33	Promotion group
3	F.C. Pardes Hanna	22	12	3	7	49	23	+26	39	
4	Hapoel Beit She'an	22	10	4	8	44	25	+19	34	
5	Hapoel Bnei Musmus	22	8	7	7	35	42	−7	31	
6	Ahi Bir al-Maksur	22	8	5	9	31	49	−18	29	
7	Maccabi Ahi Iksal	22	7	6	9	36	45	−9	27	
8	Hapoel Sandala Gilboa	22	7	2	13	33	62	−29	23	Relegation play-offs
9	Hapoel Ein as-Sahala	22	2	1	19	26	74	−48	7	Relegation to Liga Gimel

Source: Liga Bet North B IFA (in Hebrew)
Rules for classification: 1) points; 2) number of wins; 3) head to head; 6) deciding match.

=== Sub-division B ===
Pos	Team	Pld	W	D	L	GF	GA	GD	Pts	Qualification or relegation
1	Maccabi Neve Sha'anan	16	12	3	1	40	17	+23	39	Promotion group
2	Hapoel Tirat Carmel	16	11	2	3	38	8	+30	35	Promotion group
3	Ihud Bnei Kafr Qara	22	11	2	9	63	48	+15	35	
4	Maccabi Nujeidat	22	9	4	9	41	37	+4	31	
5	Ihud Bnei Baqa	22	8	4	10	37	51	−14	28 (Note: Ironi Bnei Baqa wins over Beitar Haifa in head-to-head (2–1;1–0;3–4).)	
6	Beitar Haifa	22	8	4	10	43	40	+3	28	
7	F.C. Kfar Kama	22	8	3	11	28	52	−24	27	
8	Hapoel Ramot Menashe Megiddo	22	8	2	12	30	37	−7	26	Relegation play-offs
9	Hapoel Ihud Bnei Jatt	22	5	2	15	23	53	−30	17	Relegation to Liga Gimel

Source: Liga Bet North B IFA (in Hebrew)
Rules for classification: 1) points; 2) number of wins; 3) head to head; 6) deciding match.

=== Promotion group ===
Pos	Team	Pld	W	D	L	GF	GA	GD	Pts	Qualification or relegation
1	Ironi Nesher	6	5	1	0	17	3	+14	16	Promotion to Liga Alef
2	F.C. Tirat Carmel	6	4	1	1	9	3	+6	13	Promotion play-offs
3	Maccabi Neve Sha'anan	6	0	2	4	8	19	−11	2 (Note: Maccabi Neve Sha'anan wins over Hapoel Tirat Carmel in head-to-head (on away goals) (2–2;3–3).)	
4	Hapoel Tirat Carmel	6	0	2	4	7	16	−9	2	

Source: Liga Bet North B IFA (in Hebrew)
Rules for classification: 1) points; 2) number of wins; 3) head to head; 6) deciding match.

== South A Division ==
=== Sub-division A ===
Pos	Team	Pld	W	D	L	GF	GA	GD	Pts	Qualification or relegation
1	Hapoel Mahane Yehuda	16	11	4	1	36	16	+20	37	Promotion group
2	Shimshon Tel Aviv	16	9	4	3	38	17	+21	31	Promotion group
3	Hapoel Kafr Qasim Shouaa	22	12	3	7	44	29	+15	39	
4	Maccabi Amishav Petah Tikva	22	10	5	7	33	26	+7	35	
5	Ironi Beit Dagan	22	9	6	7	38	37	+1	33	
6	Bnei Jaffa Ortodoxim	22	7	7	8	38	42	−4	28	
7	Sporting Tel Aviv	22	7	2	13	31	52	−21	23	
8	Hapoel Pardesiya	22	5	3	14	27	49	−22	18	Relegation play-offs
9	Otzma Holon	22	4	4	14	18	35	−17	16	Relegation to Liga Gimel

Source: Liga Bet South A IFA (in Hebrew)
Rules for classification: 1) points; 2) number of wins; 3) head to head; 6) deciding match.

=== Sub-division B ===
Pos	Team	Pld	W	D	L	GF	GA	GD	Pts	Qualification or relegation
1	Hapoel Hod HaSharon	16	11	2	3	47	14	+33	35	Promotion group
2	Hapoel Kiryat Ono	16	10	3	3	37	17	+20	33	Promotion group
3	Beitar Ramat Gan	22	9	7	6	37	31	+6	34	
4	Beitar Kfar Saba	22	9	5	8	27	25	+2	32	
5	Hapoel Qalansawe	22	8	4	10	34	38	−4	28	
6	Beitar Petah Tikva	22	7	6	9	29	37	−8	27	
7	F.C. Roei Heshbon Tel Aviv	22	7	5	10	27	33	−6	26	
8	Shimshon Bnei Tayibe	22	7	3	12	26	33	−7	24	Relegation play-offs
9	Hapoel Kafr Bara	22	6	3	13	19	55	−36	21	Relegation to Liga Gimel

Source: Liga Bet South A IFA (in Hebrew)
Rules for classification: 1) points; 2) number of wins; 3) head to head; 6) deciding match.

=== Promotion group ===
Pos	Team	Pld	W	D	L	GF	GA	GD	Pts	Qualification or relegation
1	Shimshon Tel Aviv	6	4	1	1	16	7	+9	13	Promotion to Liga Alef
2	Hapoel Mahane Yehuda	6	2	2	2	11	14	−3	8	Promotion play-offs
3	Hapoel Hod HaSharon	6	1	4	1	5	6	−1	7	
4	Hapoel Kiryat Ono	6	1	1	4	6	11	−5	4	

Source: Liga Bet South A IFA (in Hebrew)
Rules for classification: 1) points; 2) number of wins; 3) head to head; 6) deciding match.

== South B Division ==
=== Sub-division A ===
Pos	Team	Pld	W	D	L	GF	GA	GD	Pts	Qualification or relegation
1	Maccabi Ironi Sderot	16	11	4	1	36	5	+31	37	Promotion group
2	Bnei Eilat	16	11	2	3	44	17	+27	35	Promotion group
3	Maccabi Kiryat Malakhi	22	13	7	2	55	20	+35	46	
4	Hapoel Merhavim	22	11	8	3	39	22	+17	41	
5	Beitar Kiryat Gat	22	11	4	7	39	32	+7	37	
6	Ironi Modi'in	22	7	5	10	34	39	−5	26	
7	Hapoel Gedera	22	6	2	14	28	55	−27	20	
8	Maccabi Arad	22	2	5	15	19	53	−34	11	Relegation play-offs
9	Beitar Yavne	22	1	3	18	13	64	−51	6	Relegation to Liga Gimel

Source: Liga Bet South B IFA (in Hebrew)
Rules for classification: 1) points; 2) number of wins; 3) head to head; 6) deciding match.

=== Sub-division B ===
Pos	Team	Pld	W	D	L	GF	GA	GD	Pts	Qualification or relegation
1	Hapoel Lod	16	11	2	3	35	19	+16	35	Promotion group
2	Hapoel Yeruham	16	10	4	2	30	11	+19	34	Promotion group
3	Maccabi Netivot	22	12	6	4	49	21	+28	42	
4	F.C. Jerusalem	22	11	7	4	48	21	+27	40 (Note: F.C. Jerusalem wins over F.C. Shikun HaMizrah in head-to-head (on away goals) (3–0;1–4).)	
5	F.C. Shikun HaMizrah	22	11	6	5	48	22	+26	39	
6	Beitar Ma'ale Adumim	22	6	6	10	25	44	−19	24	
7	Tzeirei Rahat	22	6	4	12	33	53	−20	22	
8	F.C. Be'er Sheva	22	3	4	15	21	62	−41	13	Relegation play-offs
9	Beitar Ashdod	22	3	1	18	25	61	−36	10	Relegation to Liga Gimel

Source: Liga Bet South B IFA (in Hebrew)
Rules for classification: 1) points; 2) number of wins; 3) head to head; 6) deciding match.

=== Promotion group ===
Pos	Team	Pld	W	D	L	GF	GA	GD	Pts	Qualification or relegation
1	Bnei Eilat	6	3	2	1	10	5	+5	11	Promotion to Liga Alef
2	Maccabi Ironi Sderot	6	3	1	2	10	4	+6	10 (Note: Maccabi Sderot and Hapoel Yeruham finished with equal head-to-head records (0–1; 1–0). Maccabi Sderot won the deciding match 2–0.)	Promotion play-offs
3	Hapoel Yeruham	6	3	1	2	6	4	+2	10	
4	Hapoel Lod	6	1	0	5	2	15	−13	3	

Source: Liga Bet South B IFA (in Hebrew)
Rules for classification: 1) points; 2) number of wins; 3) head to head; 6) deciding match.

== Promotion play-offs ==
In the first round of the play-offs the two second-placed teams from the promotion groups (North section and South section) faced each other in a single match on neutral ground. The winner of the match faced the 14th-placed team from Liga Alef in a single match.

=== North section ===
==== First round ====
22 June 2021
19:40

Ihud Bnei Shefa-'Amr	3–0	F.C. Tirat Carmel
Kadri 11'; Khatib 25'; Bushnak 90'	IFA

Ilut Stadium
Referee: Yigal Fried

==== Second round ====
25 June 2021
16:00

Ironi Tiberias	w/o (1–0) (abandoned '90+7)	Ihud Bnei Shefa-'Amr
Mahfud (yellow card) 59'; Davidov 82'; Ben David (yellow card) 83'	IFA	(red card) 22' T. Diab; (yellow card) 22' (yellow-red card) 24' A. Diab; (yellow card) 80' (red card) 84' Khatib; (red card) 90+5' Nassar; (yellow card) 90+5' Shabal; (yellow card) 8' (red card) 90+7' Younes

Ilut Stadium
Referee: Avidad Shilo'ach

=== South section ===
==== First round ====
25 June 2021
15:30

Hapoel Mahane Yehuda	2–1	Maccabi Sderot
Shiri 19'; Elbaz 78'	IFA	57' (pen.) Kahlon

Ashdod Synthetic Pitch
Referee: Roi Reinshreiber

==== Second round ====
29 June 2021
20:00

Nordia Jerusalem	1–0	Hapoel Mahane Yehuda
Cohen 18'	IFA

Haberfeld Stadium
Referee: Gal Leibovich

== Relegation play-offs ==
In each division (North A and B and South A and B) the sixth-placed teams from each sub-division played each other, with the winning team staying in Liga Bet. The losing team from each division faced the Liga Gimel play-off winner in a single match for a place in Liga Alef.

North A

Relegation Playoffs			Test Match
			A6	Sektzia Ma'alot	0 (4)
A6	Sektzia Ma'alot	0	LG	Ironi Bnei Sha'ab	0 (5)
B6	Ahva Kafr Manda	2

South A

Relegation Playoffs			Test Match
			A6	Hapoel Pardesiya	2
A6	Hapoel Pardesiya	0	LG	HaMakhtesh Givatayim	1
B6	Shimshon Bnei Tayibe	1

North B

Relegation Playoffs			Test Match
			B6	Hapoel R. Menashe Megiddo	1
A6	Hapoel Sandala Gilboa	4	LG	Tzeirei Umm al-Fahm	3
B6	Hapoel R. Menashe Megiddo	1

South B

Relegation Playoffs			Test Match
			B6	F.C. Be'er Sheva	0
A6	Maccabi Arad	6	LG	Maccabi Be'er Sheva	3
B6	F.C. Be'er Sheva	0
