= 2020–21 Liga Leumit =

Liga Leumit
- Season: 2020–21

The 2020–21 Liga Leumit was the 22nd season as second tier since its re-alignment in 1999 and the 79th season of second-tier football in Israel.

A total of sixteen teams contested in the league, including twelve sides from the 2019–20 season, the two promoted teams from 2019–20 Liga Alef and the two relegated teams from 2019–20 Israeli Premier League.

== Changes from 2019–20 season ==
=== Team changes ===
The following teams have changed division since the 2019–20 season.

=== To Liga Leumit ===
Promoted from Liga Alef

- Hapoel Kfar Shalem (South Division)
- Hapoel Iksal (North Division)

Relegated from Premier League

- Sektzia Ness Ziona
- Hapoel Ra'anana

=== From Liga Leumit ===
Promoted to Premier League

- Maccabi Petah Tikva
- Bnei Sakhnin

Relegated to Liga Alef

- Hapoel Bnei Lod
- Hapoel Ashkelon

== Overview ==
=== Stadia and locations ===
Club	Home City	Stadium	Capacity
Beitar Tel Aviv Bat Yam	Tel Aviv and Bat Yam	Ness Ziona Stadium^{[A]}	3,500
F.C. Kafr Qasim	Kafr Qasim	Lod Municipal Stadium^{[A]}	3,000
Hapoel Acre	Acre	Acre Municipal Stadium	5,000
Hapoel Afula	Afula	Afula Illit Stadium	3,000
Hapoel Iksal	Iksal	Afula Illit Stadium^{[A]}	3,000
Hapoel Jerusalem	Jerusalem	Teddy Stadium	31,733
Hapoel Kfar Shalem	Tel Aviv	Grundman Stadium	4,300
Hapoel Nof HaGalil	Nof HaGalil	Green Stadium	5,200
Hapoel Petah Tikva	Petah Tikva	HaMoshava Stadium	11,500
Hapoel Ra'anana	Ra'anana	Ramat Gan Stadium	13,370
Hapoel Ramat Gan	Ramat Gan	Ramat Gan Stadium	13,370
Hapoel Ramat HaSharon	Ramat HaSharon	Grundman Stadium	4,300
Hapoel Rishon LeZion	Rishon LeZion	Haberfeld Stadium	6,000
Hapoel Umm al-Fahm	Umm al-Fahm	Doha Stadium^{[A]}	8,500
Maccabi Ahi Nazareth	Nazareth	Ilut Stadium	4,932
Sektzia Ness Ziona	Ness Ziona	Ness Ziona Stadium	3,500

^AThe club is playing their home games at a neutral venue because their own ground does not meet league requirements.

== Regular season ==
Pos	Team	Pld	W	D	L	GF	GA	GD	Pts	Qualification or relegation (Note: Teams play each other two times (30 rounds) before the league is split into two groups (the top eight and the bottom eight).)
1	Hapoel Nof HaGalil	30	16	9	5	39	20	+19	57	Qualification for the Promotion playoffs
2	Hapoel Jerusalem	30	14	12	4	37	16	+21	54	Qualification for the Promotion playoffs
3	Sektzia Ness Ziona	30	12	10	8	28	30	−2	46	Qualification for the Promotion playoffs
4	Beitar Tel Aviv Bat Yam	30	12	8	10	44	36	+8	44	Qualification for the Promotion playoffs
5	Hapoel Ramat HaSharon	30	11	10	9	27	23	+4	43	Qualification for the Promotion playoffs
6	Hapoel Iksal	30	11	10	9	42	42	0	43	Qualification for the Promotion playoffs
7	Hapoel Rishon LeZion	30	9	15	6	32	27	+5	42	Qualification for the Promotion playoffs
8	Hapoel Ramat Gan	30	9	13	8	33	28	+5	40	Qualification for the Promotion playoffs
9	Hapoel Afula	30	10	9	11	32	28	+4	39	Qualification for the Relegation playoffs
10	Maccabi Ahi Nazareth	30	10	9	11	32	31	+1	39	Qualification for the Relegation playoffs
11	Hapoel Ra'anana	30	8	11	11	30	31	−1	35	Qualification for the Relegation playoffs
12	F.C. Kafr Qasim	30	7	14	9	25	31	−6	35	Qualification for the Relegation playoffs
13	Hapoel Umm al-Fahm	30	7	11	12	21	33	−12	32	Qualification for the Relegation playoffs
14	Hapoel Acre	30	5	16	9	22	35	−13	31	Qualification for the Relegation playoffs
15	Hapoel Petah Tikva	30	6	9	15	17	30	−13	27	Qualification for the Relegation playoffs
16	Hapoel Kfar Shalem	30	6	8	16	32	52	−20	26	Qualification for the Relegation playoffs

Rules for classification: 1) points; 2) goal difference; 3) number of wins; 4) goals scored; 5) head to head; 6) deciding match.

== Results ==
Home \ Away	HAJ	HNG	BTB	IKS	HRS	SNZ	HRL	HRG	HAC	HAF	HUF	HRA	MAN	FKQ	HPT	HKS
Hapoel Jerusalem	—	2–1	1–0	3–0		4–1	1–1					0–3	1–0	0–0	3–1	2–0
Hapoel Nof HaGalil	0–0	—	2–1	0–0	0–0		1–0	1–1	0–0	2–1		1–0	1–3			5–1
Beitar Tel Aviv Bat Yam		0–2	—		3–0	3–0	2–2		0–2	2–1	2–0	1–0	1–1	2–1	1–1	
Hapoel Iksal	3–3		1–1	—		2–0	0–0	1–0	3–2			3–3	1–0	2–1	1–2	
Hapoel Ramat HaSharon	0–0	1–0		1–3	—			3–0		1–0	0–0	1–0		1–0	1–0	1–1
Sektzia Ness Ziona		2–1		1–1	0–1	—		0–0	3–3	1–0	2–0		1–1			1–0
Hapoel Rishon LeZion		0–0	1–0		0–0	1–2	—				0–0	1–1	2–0	3–0	0–2	3–2
Hapoel Ramat Gan	0–0		1–0	1–3		3–0	1–0	—	0–0			1–1		3–0	2–0	0–1
Hapoel Acre	0–5		1–1	0–0	1–1	0–0	0–0	1–1	—	2–0	1–1		1–0			
Hapoel Afula	0–2	3–4	0–1	4–0			0–1	1–0	0–0	—	1–1	1–0			1–0	2–0
Hapoel Umm al-Fahm	1–0	0–0	1–3	1–2	1–1		0–1	2–2	1–0	1–1	—	1–2				1–0
Hapoel Ra'anana	0–2		2–2		1–0	0–0	2–2		0–1	1–1	0–1	—	0–0	0–0	0–1	
Maccabi Ahi Nazareth		1–4		0–0	2–0	0–1		1–1		0–1	1–0		—	0–1	0–0	3–0
F.C. Kafr Qasim	0–0	0–1		0–0	0–3	2–2		0–1	1–1	1–0	1–1		1–1	—		1–1
Hapoel Petah Tikva	0–1	0–3			0–2	0–1	1–2	1–0	0–0	1–1	0–1		1–2	0–0	—	
Hapoel Kfar Shalem	0–2		1–3	1–2	1–1	0–0	1–1	1–3	0–1			2–3	2–2		2–1	—

Source: Liga Leumit IFA
Legend: Blue = home team win; Red = away team win.

== Results by round ==
The table lists the results of teams in each round.

Team ╲ Round	1	2	3	4	5	6	7	8	9	10	11	12	13	14	15	16	17	18	19	20	21	22	23	24	25	26	27	28	29	30
Beitar Tel Aviv Bat Yam	L	W	D	W	W	L	W	L	D	L	W	D	W	W	D	L	D	W	L	W	D	W	W	L	D	D	L	L	W	L
F.C. Kafr Qasim	L	D	D	L	D	L	D	D	D	L	L	D	L	W	L	L	D	W	L	W	D	D	W	D	D	D	W	W	L	W
Hapoel Acre	D	L	D	D	L	W	D	D	W	D	D	L	D	W	W	D	D	D	W	D	D	D	L	L	L	L	D	L	L	D
Hapoel Afula	D	L	D	D	L	L	L	L	L	W	W	L	W	L	W	W	L	W	D	L	D	W	D	D	W	D	L	W	W	D
Hapoel Iksal	D	D	W	D	W	W	W	L	D	D	W	D	L	D	W	L	W	W	W	D	D	L	D	W	L	L	W	L	L	L
Hapoel Jerusalem	D	D	W	W	D	L	L	W	W	D	D	L	W	D	W	W	D	W	W	W	W	D	L	D	D	W	D	L	D	W
Hapoel Kfar Shalem	L	L	D	L	L	L	D	D	L	W	L	L	L	L	L	L	W	L	D	W	D	W	L	W	D	D	W	D	D	W
Hapoel Nof HaGalil	W	W	W	L	D	W	D	L	D	W	W	W	D	W	D	W	W	D	D	L	L	W	W	L	D	D	W	W	W	W
Hapoel Petah Tikva	D	W	L	L	L	L	L	W	D	L	D	L	W	L	D	L	L	L	L	D	W	L	D	D	D	W	L	L	D	W
Hapoel Ra'anana	L	D	D	L	W	W	D	D	D	D	D	W	L	L	L	W	D	L	D	L	L	W	W	L	W	D	L	W	L	D
Hapoel Ramat Gan	D	W	L	W	W	W	D	D	D	W	L	W	L	D	D	D	D	L	W	L	L	L	L	W	D	D	D	D	D	W
Hapoel Ramat HaSharon	W	W	W	L	D	L	D	W	D	D	D	L	W	W	L	W	L	W	D	W	D	L	D	D	W	L	L	D	L	W
Hapoel Rishon LeZion	L	L	D	W	W	W	D	D	D	D	W	L	L	D	W	W	W	D	D	D	D	L	W	D	D	D	D	D	W	L
Hapoel Umm al-Fahm	W	W	L	D	L	D	W	L	D	L	L	D	W	W	D	L	D	L	D	D	D	D	L	L	L	W	L	W	D	L
Maccabi Ahi Nazareth	D	D	D	W	W	L	D	W	D	L	L	W	L	L	D	L	L	L	D	D	W	L	W	W	L	D	W	W	W	L
Sektzia Ness Ziona	D	L	D	D	D	W	W	W	L	W	L	W	L	L	L	W	D	D	L	L	D	W	L	W	W	D	W	D	W	L

Updated to match(es) played on 18 November. Source: "Ligat Leumit– Matches". soccerway.com.
W = Win; D = Draw; L = Loss

== Position by round ==
Team ╲ Round	1	2	3	4	5	6	7	8	9	10	11	12	13	14	15	16	17	18	19	20	21	22	23	24	25	26	27	28	29	30
Hapoel Nof HaGalil	2	1	1	2	4	2	3	3	3	2	1	1	1	1	1	1	1	1	2	2	2	2	2	2	2	2	2	1	1	1
Hapoel Jerusalem	4	7	5	3	5	6	11	8	4	5	5	4	2	3	4	2	2	2	1	1	1	1	1	1	1	1	1	2	2	2
Sektzia Ness Ziona	13	14	13	12	12	11	9	7	8	4	8	5	3	6	7	4	5	7	8	8	8	6	7	7	6	6	4	4	3	3
Beitar Tel Aviv Bat Yam	14	6	3	5	3	5	4	5	6	7	4	6	5	2	2	5	6	4	5	5	5	3	3	4	3	3	5	5	4	4
Hapoel Ramat HaSharon	1	3	2	1	2	4	5	4	5	6	6	8	7	5	6	3	8	5	4	4	4	5	5	5	5	5	6	6	7	5
Hapoel Iksal	5	8	6	8	7	3	1	2	2	3	2	3	6	7	3	7	3	3	3	3	3	4	4	3	4	4	3	3	5	6
Hapoel Rishon LeZion	10	13	16	14	10	9	6	9	9	9	7	9	9	9	8	8	4	6	7	6	6	7	6	6	7	7	7	7	6	7
Hapoel Ramat Gan	11	4	7	4	1	1	2	1	1	1	3	2	4	4	5	6	7	8	6	7	7	8	8	8	8	8	8	8	10	8
Hapoel Afula	8	11	10	10	14	14	15	15	15	14	13	13	13	13	13	12	12	10	10	11	11	10	11	11	9	9	10	10	9	9
Maccabi Ahi Nazareth	12	10	9	7	6	7	8	6	7	8	9	7	8	10	11	13	13	13	13	13	12	13	12	9	11	11	9	9	8	10
Hapoel Ra'anana	15	16	15	13	9	8	10	11	11	10	10	10	10	12	12	11	11	12	12	12	13	12	10	12	10	10	11	11	11	11
F.C. Kafr Qasim	16	15	14	16	15	15	14	14	14	15	15	15	15	15	15	15	15	15	14	14	14	14	14	14	13	14	13	12	12	12
Hapoel Umm al-Fahm	3	2	4	6	8	10	7	10	10	12	12	11	11	8	9	10	10	11	11	10	10	11	13	13	14	13	14	13	13	13
Hapoel Acre	7	12	11	11	13	12	12	12	12	11	11	12	12	11	10	9	9	9	9	9	9	9	9	10	12	12	12	14	14	14
Hapoel Petah Tikva	9	5	8	9	11	13	13	13	13	13	14	14	14	14	14	14	14	15	15	15	15	15	15	16	16	15	16	16	16	15
Hapoel Kfar Shalem	6	9	12	15	16	16	16	16	16	16	16	16	16	16	16	16	16	16	16	16	16	16	16	15	15	16	15	15	15	16

== Promotion playoffs ==
Pos	Team	Pld	W	D	L	GF	GA	GD	Pts	Qualification or relegation	HNG	HAJ	SNZ	HRL	BTB	HRG	HRS	IKS
1	Hapoel Nof HaGalil (Q, C)	37	20	12	5	57	26	+31	72	Promoted to Israeli Premier League	—	1–1			3–3		1–1	5–0
2	Hapoel Jerusalem (Q)	37	19	14	4	52	20	+32	71	Promoted to Israeli Premier League		—	2–0	1–1		1–0	2–0	
3	Sektzia Ness Ziona	37	16	11	10	37	38	−1	59		0–2		—		2–2		1–0	1–0
4	Hapoel Rishon LeZion	37	12	17	8	41	35	+6	53		1–3		0–1	—		1–1		
5	Beitar Tel Aviv Bat Yam	37	13	12	12	55	48	+7	51			1–2		2–3	—	1–1	1–0	
6	Hapoel Ramat Gan	37	11	15	11	44	38	+6	48		0–3		2–4			—		6–0
7	Hapoel Ramat HaSharon	37	12	11	14	32	30	+2	47					0–1		0–1	—	4–0
8	Hapoel Iksal (R)	37	11	11	15	44	67	−23	44	Relegated to Liga Alef		1–6		0–2	1–1			—

Updated to match(es) played on 12 April 2021. Source: [ Soccerway]
Legend: Blue = home team win; Yellow = draw; Red = away team win.
Rules for classification: 1) points; 2) goal difference; 3) number of wins; 4) goals scored; 5) head to head; 6) deciding match.
(C) Champions; (Q) Qualified for the phase indicated; (R) Relegated

=== Results by round ===
The table lists the results of teams in each round.

Team ╲ Round	31	32	33	34	35	36	37
Beitar Tel Aviv Bat Yam	D	D	L	D	L	D	W
Hapoel Iksal	L	D	L	L	L	L	L
Hapoel Jerusalem	D	D	W	W	W	W	W
Hapoel Nof HaGalil	D	D	W	D	W	W	W
Hapoel Ramat Gan	D	W	W	D	L	L	L
Hapoel Ramat HaSharon	D	L	L	W	L	L	L
Hapoel Rishon LeZion	D	L	W	D	W	W	L
Sektzia Ness Ziona	W	W	L	L	W	D	W

Updated to match(es) played on 18 November. Source: "Ligat Leumit– Matches". soccerway.com.
W = Win; D = Draw; L = Loss

== Relegation playoffs ==
Pos	Team	Pld	W	D	L	GF	GA	GD	Pts	Qualification or relegation	HAF	HRA	MAN	FKQ	HAC	HUF	HPT	HKS
9	Hapoel Afula	37	13	10	14	50	39	+11	49		—		5–0	2–1	1–2	0–2		
10	Hapoel Ra'anana	37	12	12	13	47	42	+5	48		3–3	—		2–0	4–2	3–2		
11	Maccabi Ahi Nazareth	37	12	9	16	37	47	−10	45			3–1	—			2–0	0–1	0–2
12	F.C. Kafr Qasim	37	9	15	13	32	40	−8	42				2–0	—		1–2	0–0	0–1
13	Hapoel Acre	37	8	18	11	34	43	−9	42				5–0	2–3	—		0–0	
14	Hapoel Umm al-Fahm (Q)	37	10	12	15	30	41	−11	42	Qualification for the Relegation playoffs					0–1	—	2–0	1–1
15	Hapoel Petah Tikva	37	10	11	16	22	33	−11	41		2–1	1–0					—	1–0
16	Hapoel Kfar Shalem (R)	37	8	10	19	37	64	−27	34	Relegated to Liga Alef	1–6	0–4			0–0			—

Updated to match(es) played on 12 April 2021. Source: [ Soccerway]
Legend: Blue = home team win; Yellow = draw; Red = away team win.
Rules for classification: 1) points; 2) goal difference; 3) number of wins; 4) goals scored; 5) head to head; 6) deciding match.
(Q) Qualified for the phase indicated; (R) Relegated

=== Results by round ===
The table lists the results of teams in each round.

Team ╲ Round	31	32	33	34	35	36	37
F.C. Kafr Qasim	L	W	D	L	W	L	L
Hapoel Acre	L	L	D	W	D	W	W
Hapoel Afula	L	W	D	W	W	L	L
Hapoel Kfar Shalem	W	D	D	L	L	W	L
Hapoel Petah Tikva	W	W	D	W	D	L	W
Hapoel Ra'anana	W	L	D	L	W	W	W
Hapoel Umm al-Fahm	W	D	L	L	L	W	W
Maccabi Ahi Nazareth	L	L	W	W	L	L	L

Updated to match(es) played on 18 November. Source: "Ligat Leumit– Matches". soccerway.com.
W = Win; D = Draw; L = Loss

== Promotion/relegation playoff ==
The 14th-placed team faced 2020–21 Liga Alef promotion play-offs winner in a one game.

31 May 2021
20:00

Hapoel Umm al-Fahm	1-0	Maccabi Jaffa
Elimelech 21'	Report

HaMoshava Stadium
Attendance: 5,000
Referee: Leibovitch

== See also ==
- 2020–21 Toto Cup Leumit
