= 2001–02 Toto Cup Al =

Toto Cup Al
- Season: 2001–02
- Champions: Hapoel Tel Aviv

The 2001–02 Toto Cup Al was the 18th season of the third most important football tournament in Israel since its introduction. This was the 3rd edition to be played with clubs of both Israeli Premier League and Liga Leumit clubs.

The competition began on 3 August 2001 and ended on 14 May 2002, with Hapoel Tel Aviv beating F.C. Ashdod 4–2 in the final.

== Results ==
=== First round ===
Team 1	Agg.	Team 2	1st leg	2nd leg
Bnei Sakhnin	3–1	Beitar Be'er Sheva	1–0	2–1
F.C. Ashdod	2–1	Hapoel Be'er Sheva	2–1	0–0
Hapoel Ra'anana	1–1 (5–4 p)	Bnei Yehuda	0–1	1–0
Hapoel Ramat Gan	2–4	Hapoel Kfar Saba	1–1	1–3
Ironi Rishon LeZion	3–2	Hapoel Beit She'an	1–1	2–1
Maccabi Ahi Nazareth	2–6	Maccabi Kiryat Gat	0–4	2–2
Maccabi Herzliya	0–2	Hakoah Ramat Gan	0–0	2–0 (Note: The IFA awarded the match to Maccabi Herzliya, as Hakoah Ramat Gan fielded an ineligible plaser, Eimantas Poderis. The match originally ended 1–0 to Hakoah.)
Maccabi Kafr Kanna	3–1	Hapoel Tzafrirm Holon	1–0	2–1

=== Second round ===
Team 1	Agg.	Team 2	1st leg	2nd leg
Maccabi Haifa	5–2	Maccabi Petah Tikva	2–0	3–2
Maccabi Netanya	2–5	F.C. Ashdod	0–1	2–4
Hapoel Petah Tikva	6–2	Beitar Jerusalem	2–0	4–2
Hapoel Ra'anana	3–5	Maccabi Herzliya	2–2	1–3
Bnei Sakhnin	(a) 2–2	Ironi Rishon LeZion	0–1	2–1
Hapoel Kfar Saba	2–3	Maccabi Kafr Kanna	1–2	1–1
Maccabi Tel Aviv	10–1	Hapoel Haifa	6–0	4–1
Maccabi Kiryat Gat	0–3	Hapoel Tel Aviv	0–2	0–1

=== Quarter-finals ===
15 January 2002	Hapoel Petah Tikva	0–1	Maccabi Tel Aviv	Petah Tikva
18:00		Report	Dego 23'	Stadium: Municipal Stadium; Referee: Yochanan Ciubotaru

22 January 2002	Maccabi Haifa	1–3	Bnei Sakhnin	Haifa
17:30	Atar 66'	Report	Muharer 10'; Gliha 22'; Georgesco 50'	Stadium: Kiryat Eliezer Stadium

22 January 2002	Maccabi Herzliya	1–2	Hapoel Tel Aviv	Herzliya
18:00	Asulin 4' (pen.)	Report	Domb 37'; Cleșcenco 89'	Stadium: Municipal Stadium

22 January 2002	F.C. Ashdod	3–1 (a.e.t.)	Maccabi Kafr Kanna	Ashdod
18:00	Elfasi 2'; Kubica 13'; Ofir 20'	Report	Azulay 60'	Stadium: Yud Alef Stadium

=== Semifinals ===
5 February 2002	Bnei Sakhnin	0–1 (a.e.t.)	Hapoel Tel Aviv	Ramat Gan
16:30		Report	Luz 99'	Stadium: Ramat Gan Stadium; Referee: Shai Shitrit

5 February 2002	F.C. Ashdod	2–1	Maccabi Tel Aviv	Ramat Gan
	Tubi 11'; Kubica 44'	Report	Zeitouni 29'	Stadium: Ramat Gan Stadium

=== Final ===
14 May 2002

Hapoel Tel Aviv	4–2	F.C. Ashdod
Luz 39'; Udi 44'; Tuama 61'; Bilić 86' (o.g.)	Report	Nyilas 65'; Revivo 83'

Ramat Gan Stadium
Attendance: 3,000
Referee: Assaf Keinan

== See also ==
- 2001–02 Toto Cup Artzit
