= 2026–27 Toto Cup Leumit =

Tournament details
- Country: Israel
- Dates: 30 July 2026 - 13 October 2026
- Teams: 16

Final positions
- Champions: Bnei Yehuda Tel Aviv (2nd title)
- Runners-up: Hapoel Acre
- Semifinalists: Maccabi Herzliya; F.C. Ashdod

Tournament statistics
- Matches played: 33
- Goals scored: 95 (2.88 per match)
- Top goal scorer: Stav Nachmani (5)
- All statistics correct as of 13 August 2026.

The 2026–27 Toto Cup Leumit is the 37th season of the second tier League Cup (as a separate competition) since its introduction. Bnei Yehuda Tel Aviv are the defending champions.

== Format ==
The sixteen Liga Leumit teams were divided into four regionalized groups, the groups winners with the best record advancing to the semi-final, while the rest of the clubs were scheduled to play classification play-offs accordance according the group results.

== Group stage ==
=== Group A ===
Pos	Team	Pld	W	D	L	GF	GA	GD	Pts	Qualification	HAC	FKY	MAN	MBR
1	Hapoel Acre	3	1	2	0	2	1	+1	5	Semi-finals		1–0		
2	F.C. Kiryat Yam	3	1	1	1	3	2	+1	4	5–8th classification play-offs			0–0	3–1
3	Maccabi Akhi Nazareth	3	0	3	0	2	2	0	3	9–12th classification play-offs	1–1			
4	Maccabi Bnei Reineh	3	0	2	1	2	4	−2	2	13–16th classification play-offs	0–0		1–1	

Legend: Blue = home team win; Yellow = draw; Red = away team win.
Rules for classification: 1) points; 2) goal difference; 3) number of wins; 4) goals scored; 5) head to head; 6) higher position in the last season.

=== Group B ===
Pos	Team	Pld	W	D	L	GF	GA	GD	Pts	Qualification	MHE	HKS	HRA	HAF
1	Maccabi Herzliya	3	2	1	0	8	4	+4	7	Semi-finals		5–3	2–0	
2	Hapoel Kfar Saba	3	2	0	1	11	7	+4	6	5–8th classification play-offs			5–1	3–1
3	Hapoel Ra'anana	3	1	0	2	4	8	−4	3	9–12th classification play-offs				3–1
4	Hapoel Afula	3	0	1	2	3	7	−4	1	13–16th classification play-offs	1–1			

Legend: Blue = home team win; Yellow = draw; Red = away team win.
Rules for classification: 1) points; 2) goal difference; 3) number of wins; 4) goals scored; 5) head to head; 6) higher position in the last season.

=== Group C ===
Pos	Team	Pld	W	D	L	GF	GA	GD	Pts	Qualification	BnY	MOD	FKQ	HKH
1	Bnei Yehuda Tel Aviv	3	2	1	0	5	2	+3	7	Semi-finals		3–1		1–1
2	Ironi Modi'in	3	1	1	1	4	5	−1	4	5–8th classification play-offs			2–1	
3	F.C. Kafr Qasim	3	1	0	2	3	4	−1	3	9–12th classification play-offs	0–1			2–1
4	Hapoel Kfar Shalem	3	0	2	1	3	4	−1	2	13–16th classification play-offs		1–1		

Legend: Blue = home team win; Yellow = draw; Red = away team win.
Rules for classification: 1) points; 2) goal difference; 3) number of wins; 4) goals scored; 5) head to head; 6) higher position in the last season.

=== Group D ===
Pos	Team	Pld	W	D	L	GF	GA	GD	Pts	Qualification	ASH	MJA	HRL	MKG
1	F.C. Ashdod	3	3	0	0	5	1	+4	9	Semi-finals			1–0	2–1
2	Maccabi Jaffa	3	1	1	1	6	6	0	4	5–8th classification play-offs	0–2		4–2	
3	Hapoel Rishon LeZion	3	1	0	2	5	6	−1	3	9–12th classification play-offs				3–1
4	Maccabi Kiryat Gat	3	0	1	2	4	7	−3	1	13–16th classification play-offs		2–2		

Legend: Blue = home team win; Yellow = draw; Red = away team win.
Rules for classification: 1) points; 2) goal difference; 3) number of wins; 4) goals scored; 5) head to head; 6) higher position in the last season.

== Classification play-offs ==
=== 13–16th classification play-offs ===
11 August 2026	Hapoel Afula	0–2	Maccabi Bnei Reineh	Afula
19:30	Ibrahim 49'; Shaker 78'			Stadium: Afula Illit Stadium; Referee: Guy Ohayon

11 August 2026	Hapoel Kfar Shalem	1–0	Maccabi Kiryat Gat	Tel Aviv
19:30	Junio 89'			Stadium: Hatikva Neighborhood Stadium; Referee: Omri Levi

=== 9–12th classification play-offs ===
12 August 2026	Hapoel Ra'anana	4–1	Maccabi Akhi Nazareth	Kfar Saba
19:30	Atlan 44', 74'; Yakubu 89', 90'		36' Mouwassi	Stadium: Levita Stadium; Referee: Aviel Levi

11 August 2026	F.C. Kafr Qasim	2–3	Hapoel Rishon LeZion	Bat Yam
19:30	César 77'; Abdir 89'		22', 40' (pen.) Ben Shimon; 59' Balay	Stadium: Bat Yam Municipal Stadium; Referee: Niv Arad

=== 5–8th classification play-offs ===
11 August 2026	Hapoel Kfar Saba	1–1 (6–7 p)	F.C. Kiryat Yam	Kfar Saba
19:30	Darzi 8'		57' Farada	Stadium: Levita Stadium; Referee: Raz Day
	Penalties
	Roizman (penalty missed); Harel (penalty scored); Darzi (penalty scored); Tzur (penalty scored); Fliter (penalty scored); Shmueli (penalty scored); Ben Hamo (penalty scored); Zadok (penalty missed)		(penalty scored) Cupido; (penalty scored) Alyenikov; (penalty missed) Farada; (penalty scored) Solomon; (penalty scored) Ifrach; (penalty scored) Agbaria; (penalty scored) Lannes Arbel; (penalty scored) Nahfaoui

11 August 2026	Ironi Modi'in	0–1	Maccabi Jaffa	Lod
19:30			89' Yitzhaki	Stadium: Lod Municipal Stadium; Referee: Roei Goldstein

== Semi-finals ==
12 August 2026	Bnei Yehuda Tel Aviv	6–0	F.C. Ashdod	Tel Aviv
19:30	Nachmani 15'; Dror 32', 42', 43'; Amer 71'; Hadadi 80'	[ Report]		Stadium: Hatikva Neighborhood Stadium; Referee: Tal Carmeli

11 August 2026	Maccabi Herzliya	0–2	Hapoel Acre	Herzliya
19:30		[ Report]	51' Badarna; 89' Sarante	Stadium: Herzliya Municipal Stadium; Referee: Ron Robin

== Final ==
13 October 2026
19:00

Bnei Yehuda Tel Aviv	1–0	Hapoel Acre
Nachmani 90+2'

Netanya Stadium, Netanya
Referee: Aviv Levi

== Final rankings ==
R	Team
1st place, gold medalist(s)	Bnei Yehuda Tel Aviv
2nd place, silver medalist(s)	Hapoel Acre
3–4	Maccabi Herzliya
3–4	F.C. Ashdod
5–6	Maccabi Jaffa
5–6	F.C. Kiryat Yam
7–8	Ironi Modi'in
7–8	Hapoel Kfar Saba
9–10	Hapoel Ra'anana
9–10	Hapoel Rishon LeZion
11–12	F.C. Kafr Qasim
11–12	Maccabi Akhi Nazareth
13–14	Maccabi Bnei Reineh
13–14	Hapoel Kfar Shalem
15–16	Maccabi Kiryat Gat
15–16	Hapoel Afula

== See also ==
- 2026–27 Toto Cup Al
- 2026–27 Liga Leumit
