= 2023–24 Toto Cup Leumit =

Tournament details
- Country: Israel
- Teams: 16

Final positions
- Champions: Ironi Tiberias (1st title)
- Runners-up: Maccabi Jaffa

Tournament statistics
- Matches played: 33
- Goals scored: 88 (2.67 per match)
- Top goal scorer: Matan Beit Ya'akov (5 Golas)

The 2023–24 Toto Cup Leumit is the 34th season of the second tier League Cup (as a separate competition) since its introduction. It was divided into two stages. First, the sixteen Liga Leumit teams were divided into four regionalized groups, the groups winners with the best record advancing to the semi-final, while the rest of the clubs were scheduled to play classification play-offs accordance according the group results.

Hapoel Rishon LeZion are the defending champions.

== Group stage ==
Groups were allocated according to geographic distribution of the clubs

=== Group A ===
Pos	Team	Pld	W	D	L	GF	GA	GD	Pts	Qualification or relegation	HAC	HNG	IKS	IBS
1	Hapoel Acre	3	3	0	0	4	1	+3	9	Semi-finals		1–0		2–1
2	Hapoel Nof HaGalil	3	1	1	1	5	2	+3	4	5–8th classification play-offs			0–0	
3	Ironi Kiryat Shmona	3	1	1	1	2	1	+1	4	9–12th classification play-offs	0–1			2–0
4	Ihud Bnei Shefa-'Amr	3	0	0	3	2	9	−7	0	13–16th classification play-offs		1–5		

Source: Israel Football Association
Rules for classification: 1) points; 2) goal difference; 3) number of wins; 4) goals scored; 5) head to head; 6)deciding match.

=== Group B ===
Pos	Team	Pld	W	D	L	GF	GA	GD	Pts	Qualification or relegation	ITI	MHE	HUF	HAF
1	Ironi Tiberias	3	2	1	0	5	1	+4	7	Semi-finals		2–0	2–0	
2	Maccabi Herzliya	3	2	0	1	6	4	+2	6	5–8th classification play-offs				4–1
3	Hapoel Umm al-Fahm	3	1	0	2	4	6	−2	3	9–12th classification play-offs		1–2		3–2
4	Hapoel Afula	3	0	1	2	4	8	−4	1	13–16th classification play-offs	1–1			

Source: Israel Football Association
Rules for classification: 1) points; 2) goal difference; 3) number of wins; 4) goals scored; 5) head to head; 6)deciding match.

=== Group C ===
Pos	Team	Pld	W	D	L	GF	GA	GD	Pts	Qualification or relegation	FKQ	HKS	HRG	HRS
1	F.C. Kafr Qasim	3	1	2	0	3	2	+1	5	Semi-finals		1–0	0–0	
2	Hapoel Kfar Saba	3	1	1	1	3	3	0	4	5–8th classification play-offs			1–0	2–2
3	Hapoel Ramat Gan Givatayim	3	1	1	1	2	2	0	4	9–12th classification play-offs				2–1
4	Hapoel Nir Ramat HaSharon	3	0	2	1	5	6	−1	2	13–16th classification play-offs	2–2			

Source: Israel Football Association
Rules for classification: 1) points; 2) goal difference; 3) number of wins; 4) goals scored; 5) head to head; 6)deciding match.

=== Group D ===
Pos	Team	Pld	W	D	L	GF	GA	GD	Pts	Qualification or relegation	MJA	SNZ	BnY	HRL
1	Maccabi Jaffa	3	3	0	0	10	2	+8	9	Semi-finals		3–0		
2	Sektzia Ness Ziona	3	2	0	1	4	4	0	6	5–8th classification play-offs			3–1	1–0
3	Bnei Yehuda Tel Aviv	3	1	0	2	2	7	−5	3	9–12th classification play-offs	4–0			
4	Hapoel Rishon LeZion	3	0	0	3	2	5	−3	0	13–16th classification play-offs	2–3		0–1	

Source: Israel Football Association
Rules for classification: 1) points; 2) goal difference; 3) number of wins; 4) goals scored; 5) head to head; 6)deciding match.

== Classification play-offs ==
=== 13–16th classification play-offs ===
17 August 2023	Hapoel Afula	1-1 (5-4 p)	Ihud Bnei Shefa-'Amr	Afula
19:00	Ifrach 15' (pen.)	[ Report]	83' Amer	Stadium: Afula Illit Stadium; Referee: Omer Biran
	Penalties
	Mor (penalty scored); Shankor (penalty scored); Kachila (penalty scored); Rivollier (penalty scored); Ben Shimol (penalty scored)		El-Khatib (penalty missed); Arshid (penalty scored); Abu Ras (penalty scored); Amer (penalty scored); Bushanek (penalty scored)

17 August 2023	Hapoel Rishon LeZion	0-2	Hapoel Nir Ramat HaSharon	Rishon LeZion
19:00		[ Report]	8' Ben Hamo; 58' Onyekachi	Stadium: Haberfeld Stadium; Referee: Guy Ohayon

=== 9–12th classification play-offs ===
17 August 2023	Hapoel Umm al-Fahm	0-3	Ironi Kiryat Shmona	Umm al-Fahm
19:00		[ Report]		Stadium: HaShalom Stadium; Referee: Tal Karmi

21 August 2023	Bnei Yehuda Tel Aviv	1-1 (a.e.t.) (4–5 p)	Hapoel Ramat Gan Givatayim	Tel Aviv
19:00	Buzaglo 70'	[ Report]	75' Igbokwe	Stadium: Bloomfield Stadium; Referee: Vitali Bondarev
	Penalties
	Buzaglo (penalty scored); Hirsh (penalty scored); Otachi (penalty missed); Hen (penalty scored); Barry (penalty scored); Israeli (penalty missed)		Abu (penalty scored); Messika (penalty scored); Elmaliah (penalty scored); Aviv (penalty scored); Dror (penalty missed); Shamir (penalty scored)

=== 5–8th classification play-offs ===
16 August 2023	Sektzia Ness Ziona	4-3	Hapoel Kfar Saba	Ness Ziona
19:30	David 23'; Gabizon 32'; Berkovich 46'; Ozbelo 90+4'	[ Report]	39' Mor Yosef; 86' Biton; 90' Berkovich	Stadium: Ness Ziona Stadium; Referee: Ron Rubin

17 August 2023	Maccabi Herzliya	0-1	Hapoel Nof HaGalil	Netanya
19:00		[ Report]	66' Azulay	Stadium: Netanya Stadium; Referee: Rafael Gave

== Semi-finals ==
17 August 2023	Ironi Tiberias	3-1	Hapoel Acre	Afula
	Konstantini 28' (pen.); Velblum 42'; César 53'	[ Report]	39' Vilotić	Stadium: Afula Illit Stadium; Referee: Aviv Amdorski

17 August 2023	Maccabi Jaffa	2-1	F.C. Kafr Qasim	Ness Ziona
19:00	Beit Ya'akov 58'; Itzhak 62'	[ Report]	23' Rigan	Stadium: Ness Ziona Stadium; Referee: Omer Azar

== Final ==
27 September 2023

Ironi Tiberias	1-0	Maccabi Jaffa
Mazurek 70'	[ Report]

HaMoshava Stadium
Attendance: Petah Tikva
Referee: Vitali Bondarev

== Final rankings ==
R	Team
1st place, gold medalist(s)	Ironi Tiberias
2nd place, silver medalist(s)	Maccabi Jaffa
3–4	F.C. Kafr Qasim
3–4	Hapoel Acre
5–6	Sektzia Ness Ziona
5–6	Hapoel Nof HaGalil
7–8	Hapoel Kfar Saba
7–8	Maccabi Herzliya
9–10	Ironi Kiryat Shmona
9–10	Hapoel Ramat Gan Givatayim
11–12	Bnei Yehuda Tel Aviv
11–12	Hapoel Umm al-Fahm
13–14	Hapoel Nir Ramat HaSharon
13–14	Hapoel Afula
15–16	Ihud Bnei Shefa-'Amr
15–16	Hapoel Rishon LeZion

== See also ==
- 2023–24 Toto Cup Al
- 2023–24 Liga Leumit
