= Mohamed Bamba (footballer, born 2001) =

Ivorian footballer (born 2001)

Personal information
- Full name: Mohamed Bamba
- Date of birth: 10 December 2001 (age 24)
- Place of birth: Bouaké, Ivory Coast
- Position: Forward

Team information
- Current team: Lorient
- Number: 9

Youth career
- Bouaké

Senior career*
Years	Team	Apps	(Gls)
2018–2020	Bouaké	78	(13)
2020–2023	Hapoel Rishon LeZion	98	(30)
2023–2024	WAC/St. Andrä II	1	(1)
2023–2024	Wolfsberg	15	(6)
2024–	Lorient	52	(12)

International career
2024	Ivory Coast U23	1	(1)
- * Club domestic league appearances and goals as of 19 May 2026

Mohamed Bamba (born 10 December 2001) is an Ivorian professional footballer who plays as a forward for Ligue 1 club Lorient.

== Career ==
Bamba began playing football with the Ivorian club Bouaké. He moved to Israel with Hapoel Rishon LeZion on 18 January 2020 in the Liga Leumit. He spent 3 seasons with Hapoel Rishon LeZion, winning the 2022–23 Toto Cup Leumit and making 30 goals and 11 assists in 101 games. He was the top scorer for the 2022–23 Liga Leumit with 20 goals. He transferred to the Austrian Football Bundesliga club Wolfsberg on 28 July 2023 on a 3-year contract. In his first 7 appearances with Wolfsberg, he had 5 goals and an assist.

Under manager Manfred Schmid Bamba has been utilised as part of a front two in a 3-4-1-2 or as a lone striker in a 4–3–3. The Ivorian has been praised for his athletic ability, off the ball movement and his strong pressing capabilities.

On 26 January 2024, Bamba signed a 4.5-year contract with Lorient in France.

== International career ==
Bamba was born in the Ivory Coast to an Ivorian father and Guinean mother. He was called up to the Guinea national team in October 2023, but opted not to go. On 23 March 2024, he scored on his debut with the Ivory Coast U23s in a 3–2 loss to the France U23s.

== Honours ==
Hapoel Rishon LeZion

- Toto Cup Leumit: 2022–23

Lorient

- Ligue 2: 2024–25

Individual

- Liga Leumit top scorer: 2022–23
