= 2025–26 Toto Cup Leumit =

Tournament details
- Country: Israel
- Dates: 31 July 2025-September 2025
- Teams: 16

Final positions
- Champions: Bnei Yehuda Tel Aviv (1st title)
- Runners-up: F.C. Kiryat Yam
- Semifinalists: Hapoel Rishon LeZion; Hapoel Ra'anana

Tournament statistics
- Matches played: 32
- Goals scored: 86 (2.69 per match)
- Top goal scorer(s): Osama Khalaila (Hapoel Acre); Or Roizman (Hapoel Kfar Shalem); Ameer Ryan (Hapoel Nof HaGalil); Ihab Abu Alshikh (Hapoel Kfar Saba) (3 Golas each)
- All statistics correct as of 26 June 2025.

The 2025–26 Toto Cup Leumit is the 36th season of the second tier League Cup (as a separate competition) since its introduction.

Hapoel Tel Aviv are the defending champions.

== Format ==
The sixteen Liga Leumit teams were divided into four regionalized groups, the groups winners with the best record advancing to the semi-final, while the rest of the clubs were scheduled to play classification play-offs accordance according the group results.

== Group stage ==
=== Group A ===
Pos	Team	Pld	W	D	L	GF	GA	GD	Pts	Qualification	FKY	HAC	HNG	HHA
1	F.C. Kiryat Yam	3	2	1	0	7	4	+3	7	Semi-finals			1–1	
2	Hapoel Acre	3	2	0	1	7	6	+1	6	5–8th classification play-offs	2–4		2–0	
3	Hapoel Nof HaGalil	3	1	1	1	3	4	−1	4	9–12th classification play-offs				2–1
4	Hapoel Hadera	3	0	0	3	4	7	−3	0	13–16th classification play-offs	1–2	2–3		

Rules for classification: 1) points; 2) goal difference; 3) number of wins; 4) goals scored; 5) head to head; 6) higher position in the last season.

=== Group B ===
Pos	Team	Pld	W	D	L	GF	GA	GD	Pts	Qualification	HRA	MHE	HKS	HAF
1	Hapoel Ra'anana	3	2	1	0	6	0	+6	7	Semi-finals			1–0	
2	Maccabi Herzliya	3	2	1	0	6	1	+5	7	5–8th classification play-offs	0–0			4–0
3	Hapoel Kfar Saba	3	1	0	2	4	5	−1	3	9–12th classification play-offs		1–2		2–3
4	Hapoel Afula	3	0	0	3	2	12	−10	0	13–16th classification play-offs	5–0			

Rules for classification: 1) points; 2) goal difference; 3) number of wins; 4) goals scored; 5) head to head; 6) higher position in the last season.

=== Group C ===
Pos	Team	Pld	W	D	L	GF	GA	GD	Pts	Qualification	BnY	MPT	HKH	MJA
1	Bnei Yehuda Tel Aviv	3	2	1	0	5	3	+2	7	Semi-finals				2–1
2	Maccabi Petah Tikva	3	2	0	1	6	5	+1	6	5–8th classification play-offs	1–2		3–2	
3	Hapoel Kfar Shalem	3	0	2	1	4	5	−1	2	9–12th classification play-offs	1–1			1–1
4	Maccabi Jaffa	3	0	1	2	3	4	−1	1	13–16th classification play-offs		1–2		

Rules for classification: 1) points; 2) goal difference; 3) number of wins; 4) goals scored; 5) head to head; 6) higher position in the last season.

=== Group D ===
Pos	Team	Pld	W	D	L	GF	GA	GD	Pts	Qualification	HRL	HRG	FKQ	MOD
1	Hapoel Rishon LeZion	3	2	1	0	6	1	+5	7	Semi-finals		1–1		4–0
2	Hapoel Ramat Gan Givatayim	3	2	1	0	5	1	+4	7	5–8th classification play-offs				2–0
3	F.C. Kafr Qasim	3	1	0	2	2	4	−2	3	9–12th classification play-offs	0–1	0–2		
4	Ironi Modi'in	3	0	0	3	1	8	−7	0	13–16th classification play-offs			1–2	

Rules for classification: 1) points; 2) goal difference; 3) number of wins; 4) goals scored; 5) head to head; 6) higher position in the last season.

== Classification play-offs ==
=== 13–16th classification play-offs ===
14 August 2025	Hapoel Afula	0–3	Maccabi Jaffa	Afula
19:30		[ Report]	14' Kingsley; 84' Itzhak; 87' Adam	Stadium: Afula Illit Stadium; Referee: Aviel Levi

18 August 2025	Ironi Modi'in	2–1	Hapoel Hadera	Tel Aviv
19:30	Yehezkel 66'; Ella 73'	[ Report]	Farhat 35'	Stadium: Hatikva Neighborhood Stadium; Referee: Shay Megira

=== 9–12th classification play-offs ===
14 August 2025	F.C. Kafr Qasim	1–1 (2–4 p)	Hapoel Nof HaGalil	Acre
19:30	Agu 52'	[ Report]	64' Ryan	Stadium: Acre Municipal Stadium; Referee: Vitall Bondarev
	Penalties
	Mar'ab (penalty scored); Joury (penalty missed); Agu (penalty scored); Abdir (penalty missed)		(penalty scored) Berkman; (penalty scored) Golan; (penalty scored) Daniel; (penalty scored) Ryan

18 August 2025	Hapoel Kfar Saba	1–1 (4–3 p)	Hapoel Kfar Shalem	Kfar Saba
	Koren 7'	[ Report]	9' Roizman	Stadium: Levita Stadium; Referee: Omer Azar
	Penalties
	Ehud (penalty scored); Elshtein (penalty scored); Peretz (penalty scored); Koren (penalty scored)		(penalty scored) Roizman; (penalty scored) Azulay; (penalty missed) Chane; (penalty scored) Hazut; (penalty missed) Maya

=== 5–8th classification play-offs ===
14 August 2025	Maccabi Herzliya	1–2	Maccabi Petah Tikva	Netanya
19:30	Mizan 80'	[ Report]	10' Owusu; 67' Altoury	Stadium: Netanya Stadium; Referee: Niv Arad

18 August 2025	Hapoel Ramat Gan Givatayim	0–1	Hapoel Acre	Ness Ziona
19:30		[ Report]	21' Rabah	Stadium: Ness Ziona Stadium; Referee: Omer Biran

== Semi-finals ==
18 August 2025	Hapoel Ra'anana	0–1	Bnei Yehuda Tel Aviv	Ramat HaSharon
19:30		[ Report]	57' Gbolahan	Stadium: Grundman Stadium; Referee: Guy Ohayon

14 August 2025	Hapoel Rishon LeZion	0–0 (3–4 p)	F.C. Kiryat Yam	Ness Ziona
19:30		[ Report]		Stadium: Ness Ziona Stadium; Referee: Aviv Amdorski
	Penalties
	Jan (penalty scored); Abu (penalty missed); Levi (penalty scored); Ochowechi (penalty scored); Peleg (penalty missed)		(penalty scored) Avramov; (penalty scored) Sanker; (penalty scored) Cohen; (penalty scored) Barak

== Final ==
15 October 2025
19:00

Bnei Yehuda Tel Aviv	0–0	F.C. Kiryat Yam
	[ Report]
Penalties
Dror (penalty scored); Bar (penalty scored); Pierrot (penalty scored); Hassan (penalty missed); Agiyapong (penalty scored); Berman (penalty scored); Balulu (penalty scored); Nachmias (penalty scored); Levita (penalty scored)	8–7	(penalty scored) Avramov; (penalty scored) Sanker; (penalty scored) Nawi; (penalty scored) Atias; (penalty missed) Daniel; (penalty scored) Dabach; (penalty scored) Alyenikov; (penalty scored) Potkin; (penalty missed) Etoungou

Netanya Stadium
Referee: Omer Biran

== Final rankings ==
R	Team
1st place, gold medalist(s)	Bnei Yehuda Tel Aviv
2nd place, silver medalist(s)	F.C. Kiryat Yam
3–4	Hapoel Rishon LeZion
3–4	Hapoel Ra'anana
5–6	Maccabi Petah Tikva
5–6	Hapoel Acre
7–8	Maccabi Herzliya
7–8	Hapoel Ramat Gan Givatayim
9–10	Hapoel Nof HaGalil
9–10	Hapoel Kfar Saba
11–12	F.C. Kafr Qasim
11–12	Hapoel Kfar Shalem
13–14	Maccabi Jaffa
13–14	Ironi Modi'in
15–16	Hapoel Afula
15–16	Hapoel Hadera

== See also ==
- 2025–26 Toto Cup Al
- 2025–26 Liga Leumit
