= 2024–25 Toto Cup Leumit =

Tournament details
- Country: Israel
- Teams: 16

Tournament statistics
- Matches played: 32
- Goals scored: 87 (2.72 per match)
- Top goal scorer: Ben Hadadi (4 Golas)

The 2024–25 Toto Cup Leumit is the 35th season of the second tier League Cup (as a separate competition) since its introduction.

Ironi Tiberias are the defending champions.

== Format ==
The sixteen Liga Leumit teams were divided into four regionalized groups, the groups winners with the best record advancing to the semi-final, while the rest of the clubs were scheduled to play classification play-offs accordance according the group results.

== Group stage ==
=== Group A ===
Pos	Team	Pld	W	D	L	GF	GA	GD	Pts	Qualification	HNG	HAF	HUF	HAC
1	Hapoel Nof HaGalil	3	3	0	0	7	2	+5	9	Semi-finals		2–1		
2	Hapoel Afula	3	2	0	1	4	3	+1	6	5–8th classification play-offs				2–1
3	Hapoel Umm al-Fahm	3	1	0	2	3	3	0	3	9–12th classification play-offs	1–2	0–1		
4	Hapoel Acre	3	0	0	3	1	7	−6	0	13–16th classification play-offs	0–3		0–2	

Rules for classification: 1) points; 2) goal difference; 3) number of wins; 4) goals scored; 5) head to head; 6) higher position in the last season.

=== Group B ===
Pos	Team	Pld	W	D	L	GF	GA	GD	Pts	Qualification	HRA	HRS	MHE	HKS
1	Hapoel Ra'anana	3	1	2	0	6	5	+1	5	Semi-finals		1–1		
2	Hapoel Nir Ramat HaSharon	3	1	2	0	4	3	+1	5	5–8th classification play-offs			2–1	
3	Maccabi Herzliya	3	1	1	1	7	7	0	4	9–12th classification play-offs	3–3			3–2
4	Hapoel Kfar Saba	3	0	1	2	5	6	−1	1	13–16th classification play-offs	1–2	1–1		

Rules for classification: 1) points; 2) goal difference; 3) number of wins; 4) goals scored; 5) head to head; 6) higher position in the last season.

=== Group C ===
Pos	Team	Pld	W	D	L	GF	GA	GD	Pts	Qualification	HTA	BnY	HRG	HKH
1	Hapoel Tel Aviv	3	3	0	0	6	2	+4	9	Semi-finals		1–0		2–0
2	Bnei Yehuda Tel Aviv	3	1	1	1	4	2	+2	4	5–8th classification play-offs				3–0
3	Hapoel Ramat Gan Givatayim	3	1	1	1	5	4	+1	4	9–12th classification play-offs	2–3	1–1		
4	Hapoel Kfar Shalem	3	0	0	3	0	7	−7	0	13–16th classification play-offs			0–2	

Rules for classification: 1) points; 2) goal difference; 3) number of wins; 4) goals scored; 5) head to head; 6) higher position in the last season.

=== Group D ===
Pos	Team	Pld	W	D	L	GF	GA	GD	Pts	Qualification	HRL	HPT	MJA	FKQ
1	Hapoel Rishon LeZion	3	1	2	0	5	2	+3	5	Semi-finals			1–1	3–0
2	Hapoel Petah Tikva	3	1	2	0	4	3	+1	5	5–8th classification play-offs	1–1			1–1
3	Maccabi Jaffa	3	1	1	1	4	3	+1	4	9–12th classification play-offs		1–2		
4	F.C. Kafr Qasim	3	0	1	2	1	6	−5	1	13–16th classification play-offs			0–2	

Rules for classification: 1) points; 2) goal difference; 3) number of wins; 4) goals scored; 5) head to head; 6) higher position in the last season.

== Classification play-offs ==
=== 13–16th classification play-offs ===
15 August 2024	Hapoel Kfar Saba	0 - 0 (2 - 4 p)	Hapoel Acre	Kfar Saba
19:00		[ Report]		Stadium: Levita Stadium; Referee: Omer Biran
	Penalties
	Sheikh Yosef (penalty missed); Julio César (penalty missed); Levi (penalty scored); Ben Shushan (penalty scored)		Hagani (penalty scored); Sapir (penalty missed); Abu Fani (penalty scored); Taha (penalty scored); Atias (penalty scored)

14 August 2024	Hapoel Kfar Shalem	1 - 4	F.C. Kafr Qasim	Ramat Gan
19:00	Biton 13'	[ Report]	17' Amsalam; 30' Sarsour; 57' Dabour; 72' Swaed	Stadium: Ramat Gan Stadium; Referee: Aviel Levi

=== 9–12th classification play-offs ===
15 August 2024	Maccabi Herzliya	0 - 0 (4 - 2 p)	Hapoel Umm al-Fahm	Ramat HaSharon
19:00		[ Report]		Stadium: Grundman Stadium; Referee: Niv Arad
	Penalties
	Vaturi (penalty scored); Fadida (penalty scored); Lavi (penalty scored); Ovadia (penalty scored)		Kodorchinko (penalty scored); Ameka (penalty scored); Mahagna (penalty missed); Tzafrir (penalty missed)

15 August 2024	Hapoel Ramat Gan Givatayim	2 - 2 (2 - 4 p)	Maccabi Jaffa	Ramat Gan
19:00	Kanyuk 24'; Simantov 37'	[ Report]	11' Matan Beit Ya'akov; 68' Yehezkel	Stadium: Ramat Gan Stadium; Referee: Guy Ohayon
	Penalties
	Levi (penalty scored); Kanyuk (penalty missed); Messikka (penalty scored); Nachmias (penalty missed)		Yerushalmi (penalty scored); Merenstein (penalty scored); Yehezkel (penalty missed); Magbo (penalty scored); Peretz (penalty scored)

=== 5–8th classification play-offs ===
14 August 2024	Hapoel Nir Ramat HaSharon	2 - 2 (4 - 5 p)	Hapoel Afula	Ramat HaSharon
19:00	Hadadi 23'; Khatib 24'	[ Report]	Kule 22'; Darwish 37'	Stadium: Grundman Stadium; Referee: Ron Rubin
	Penalties
	Gabay (penalty scored); Mizan (penalty scored); Hadadi (penalty scored); Cordoba (penalty scored); Balahssan (penalty missed)		Kule (penalty scored); Elimalch (penalty scored); Daniel (penalty scored); Shaban (penalty scored); Desta (penalty scored)

14 August 2024	Bnei Yehuda Tel Aviv	1 - 2	Hapoel Petah Tikva	Tel Aviv
19:00	Ben Shimol 42'	[ Report]	34' Beni; 50' David	Stadium: Bloomfield Stadium; Referee: Aviv Amdorski

== Semi-finals ==
14 August 2024	Hapoel Ra'anana	1 - 1 (1 - 3 p)	Hapoel Nof HaGalil	Kfar Saba
19:00	Azaria 75'	[ Report]	77' Ryan	Stadium: Levita Stadium; Referee: Omer Azar
	Penalties
	Mizrahi (penalty missed); Azaria (penalty missed); Gad (penalty scored); Lin (penalty missed)		Berkman (penalty scored); Shedo (penalty scored); Almashly (penalty missed); Ryan (penalty scored)

15 August 2024	Hapoel Tel Aviv	4 - 1	Hapoel Rishon LeZion	Tel Aviv
19:00	Cohen 11'; Makarić 84', 90+3'; Alkokin 90+1'	[ Report]	80' Davidov	Stadium: Bloomfield Stadium; Referee: Rafael Gaba

== Final ==
September 2024

Hapoel Nof HaGalil	0-2	Hapoel Tel Aviv
	[ Report]

== Final rankings ==
R	Team
1st place, gold medalist(s)	Hapoel Tel Aviv
2nd place, silver medalist(s)	Hapoel Nof HaGalil
3–4	Hapoel Ra'anana
3–4	Hapoel Rishon LeZion
5–6	Hapoel Petah Tikva
5–6	Hapoel Afula
7–8	Hapoel Nir Ramat HaSharon
7–8	Bnei Yehuda Tel Aviv
9–10	Maccabi Herzliya
9–10	Maccabi Jaffa
11–12	Hapoel Ramat Gan Givatayim
11–12	Hapoel Umm al-Fahm
13–14	F.C. Kafr Qasim
13–14	Hapoel Acre
15–16	Hapoel Kfar Saba
15–16	Hapoel Kfar Shalem

== See also ==
- 2024–25 Toto Cup Al
- 2024–25 Liga Leumit
