= Frantz Pierrot =

Haitian footballer (born 1999)

Personal information
- Full name: Frantz Richard Pierrot
- Date of birth: 20 April 1999 (age 27)
- Place of birth: Cap-Haïtien, Haiti
- Height: 1.85 m (6 ft 1 in)
- Position: Forward

College career
Years	Team	Apps	(Gls)
2018–2020	Saint Joseph's Hawks	35	(4)
2020–2021	Merrimack Warriors	21	(13)
2022	UConn Huskies	14	(5)

Senior career*
Years	Team	Apps	(Gls)
2017	Westchester Flames	7	(5)
2018	Reading United	2	(0)
2019	Boston Bolts	10	(5)
2021	Seacoast United Phantoms	12	(1)
2023	Athlone Town	34	(20)
2024	Drogheda United	31	(10)
2025	Velež Mostar	9	(3)
2025–2026	Bnei Yehuda	10	(2)
2026	Galway United	29	(5)

International career^{‡}
2024	Haiti	1	(0)
- * Club domestic league appearances and goals as of 22:12, 4 November 2026 (UTC) ‡ National team caps and goals as of 18:37, 25 June 2024 (UTC)

Frantz Richard Pierrot (French: [fʁɑ̃ts ʁiʃaʁ pjɛʁo]; born 20 April 1999) is a Haitian professional footballer who plays as a forward, most recently for Galway United in the League of Ireland Premier Division and the Haiti national team.

== Club career ==
=== College & early career in the USL ===
Pierrot played two years of college soccer with Saint Joseph's Hawks from 2018 to 2020, two further years with Merrimack Warriors from 2020 to 2021 and a year with UConn Huskies in 2022.

Pierrot also appeared for USL League Two sides Westchester Flames, Reading United, Boston Bolts, Seacoast United Phantoms between 2017 and 2021.

In December 2022, he was selected as a Round 3 pick by Major League Soccer side Houston Dynamo in the 2023 MLS SuperDraft, but he ultimately opted to pursue other options in Europe.

=== Athlone Town ===
He signed for Athlone Town in the League of Ireland First Division ahead of their 2023 campaign, making his debut on 18 February 2023 and scoring twice in a 3–1 win away to Longford Town in a local derby game. On 28 April 2023, he scored a hat-trick in a 3–0 win at home to Wexford at Athlone Town Stadium. At the end of the season, he was voted into the 2023 PFAI First Division Team of the Year by his fellow players after scoring 22 goals in 38 appearances in all competitions.

=== Drogheda United ===
He signed for League of Ireland Premier Division club Drogheda United ahead of the 2024 season. He made his debut for the club on 16 February 2024 away to Derry City at the Ryan McBride Brandywell Stadium. On 12 April 2024, he scored his first goal for the club with an 86th-minute equaliser in a 2–2 draw with Derry City at United Park. On 10 November 2024, Pierrot started in the 2024 FAI Cup final as his side defeated Derry City 2–0 at the Aviva Stadium to win the cup for the first time in 19 years.

=== Velež Mostar ===
On 9 January 2025, Pierrot signed for Premier League of Bosnia and Herzegovina club FK Velež Mostar until the end of their season. He made a total of 11 appearances in all competitions during his time with the club, scoring 3 goals.

=== Bnei Yehuda ===
On 1 June 2025, he signed for Liga Leumit club Bnei Yehuda. On 15 October 2025, he scored his penalty in the shootout as his side defeated Kiryat Yam 8–7 on penalties after a 0–0 draw to win the 2025–26 Toto Cup Leumit.

=== Galway United ===
On 23 February 2026, it was announced that Pierrot had returned to the League of Ireland Premier Division, signing for Galway United. He scored 5 goals in 31 appearances in all competitions during the season before it was announced on 4 November 2026 that he had left the club following the end of his contract.

== International career ==
In May 2023, Pierrot was included in the provisional squad for Haiti's 2023 CONCACAF Gold Cup campaign, but did not make the final cut. On 23 March 2024, he made his international debut for Haiti in a 1–1 draw with French Guiana in a friendly.

== Personal life ==
Pierrot was born in Haiti, but grew up in Massachusetts in the United States where he attended Melrose High School. His older brother Frantzdy Pierrot is also a professional footballer, currently playing in Greece with AEK Athens and featured for the nation at the 2026 FIFA World Cup.

== Career statistics ==
=== Club ===
As of match played 30 October 2026

Appearances and goals by club, season and competition
Club	Season	League			National cup (Note: Includes U.S. Open Cup, FAI Cup, Bosnian Cup & Israel State Cup)		Other		Total	
Club	Season	Division	Apps	Goals	Apps	Goals	Apps	Goals	Apps	Goals
Westchester Flames	2017	USL League Two	7	5	—		—		7	5
Reading United	2018	USL League Two	2	0	0	0	—		2	0
Boston Bolts	2019	USL League Two	10	5	—		—		10	5
Seacoast United Phantoms	2021	USL League Two	12	4	—		1 (Note: Appearance in the 2021 USL League Two Playoffs)	0	13	4
Athlone Town	2023	LOI First Division	34	20	1	0	3 (Note: One appearance in the Leinster Senior Cup; two appearances, two goals in 2023 League of Ireland First Division Play-offs)	2	38	22
Drogheda United	2024	LOI Premier Division	31	10	5	1	3 (Note: 2 appearances, 1 goal in the Leinster Senior Cup & 1 appearance, 2 goals in the 2024 League of Ireland Premier Division Promotion/Relegation Playoff)	3	39	14
FK Velež Mostar	2024–25	Premier League of Bosnia and Herzegovina	9	3	2	0	—		11	3
Bnei Yehuda	2025–26	Liga Leumit	10	2	0	0	4 (Note: Appearances in the Toto Cup Leumit)	1	14	3
Galway United	2026	LOI Premier Division	29	5	2	0	—		31	5
Career total			144	54	10	1	11	6	165	61

=== International ===
As of match played 23 March 2024

Appearances and goals by national team and year
National team	Year	Apps	Goals
Haiti	2024	1	0
Total		1	0

== Honours ==
Drogheda United

- FAI Cup: 2024

Bnei Yehuda

- Toto Cup Leumit: 2025–26
