= 2026–27 Toto Cup Al =

Tournament details
- Country: Israel
- Dates: 16 July 2026 - 29 October 2026
- Teams: 14

Final positions
- Champions: Hapoel Tel Aviv (3rd title)
- Runners-up: Maccabi Tel Aviv
- Semifinalists: Ironi Kiryat Shmona

Tournament statistics
- Matches played: 30
- Goals scored: 93 (3.1 per match)
- Top goal scorer: Alon Turgeman (5)

Awards
- Best player: Maccabi Netanya
- All statistics correct as of 5 August 2026.

The 2026–27 Toto Cup Al is the 42nd season of the football tournament in Israel since its introduction and the 20th tournament involving Israeli Premier League clubs only. Beitar Jerusalem are the defending champions

== Format ==
The four clubs playing in the UEFA competitions (Hapoel Be'er Sheva, Maccabi Tel Aviv, Beitar Jerusalem and Hapoel Tel Aviv) will not take part in the group stage, while the remaining ten clubs were divided into two groups of five, at the end of the group stage each of the group winners will qualify to the semi-finals. Hapoel Be'er Sheva and Maccabi Tel Aviv played in the 2026 Israel Super Cup match for a place in one of the semi-finals (meeting the group winner with the least points accumulated), and while Beitar Jerusalem and Hapoel Tel Aviv played for a place in the other semi-final (meeting the group winner with the most points accumulated). All clubs will participate in classification play-offs to determine their final positions.

== Group stage ==
Groups were allocated according to geographic distribution of the clubs, with the northern clubs allocated to Group A, and the southern clubs allocated to Group B. Each club played the other clubs once.

The matches started on 25 July 2026.

=== Group A ===
Pos	Team	Pld	W	D	L	GF	GA	GD	Pts	Qualification	IKS	HHA	MHA	ITI	BnS
1	Ironi Kiryat Shmona	4	4	0	0	8	1	+7	12	Semi-finals			3–0		1–0
2	Hapoel Haifa	4	3	0	1	9	7	+2	9	5–8th classification play-offs	1–3			3–1	
3	Maccabi Haifa	4	2	0	2	7	8	−1	6	9–10th classification play-offs		2–3		4–2	
4	Ironi Tiberias	4	1	0	3	5	9	−4	3	11–12th classification play-offs	0–1				2–1
5	Bnei Sakhnin	4	0	0	4	2	6	−4	0	13–14th classification play-offs		1–2	0–1		

Legend: Blue = home team win; Yellow = draw; Red = away team win.
Rules for classification: 1) points; 2) goal difference; 3) number of wins; 4) goals scored; 5) head to head; 6) higher position in the last season.

=== Group B ===
Pos	Team	Pld	W	D	L	GF	GA	GD	Pts	Qualification	MNE	HRG	HJE	HPT	MPT
1	Maccabi Netanya	4	3	0	1	9	5	+4	9	Semi-finals		2–3	3–1		
2	Hapoel Ramat Gan	4	2	1	1	8	7	+1	7	5–8th classification play-offs			2–2	2–1	
3	Hapoel Jerusalem	4	2	1	1	7	6	+1	7	9–10th classification play-offs				3–1	1–0
4	Hapoel Petah Tikva	4	1	0	3	3	7	−4	3	11–12th classification play-offs	2–0				1–0
5	Maccabi Petah Tikva	4	1	0	3	3	5	−2	3	13–14th classification play-offs	1–2	2–1			

Legend: Blue = home team win; Yellow = draw; Red = away team win.
Rules for classification: 1) points; 2) goal difference; 3) number of wins; 4) goals scored; 5) head to head; 6) higher position in last season.

== European qualification route ==
=== Israel Super Cup ===
16 July 2026
19:30

Hapoel Be'er Sheva	1–3	Maccabi Tel Aviv
Kangwa 14'		10', 73' Abu Farchi; 58' Peretz

Turner Stadium, Be'er Sheva
Referee: Aviv Klein

=== UEFA qualifiers match ===
18 July 2026
20:30

Beitar Jerusalem	2–2	Hapoel Tel Aviv
Kalu 23'; Weissman 75' (pen.)		19' Chico; 90+7' Dappa
Penalties
Weissman (penalty scored); Ben Shimol (penalty missed); Muzie (penalty missed); Enow (penalty missed)	1–3	(penalty scored) Ferber; (penalty scored) Buskila; (penalty scored) Chico; (penalty missed) Boateng

Netanya Stadium, Netanya
Referee: Snir Levi

== Classification play-offs ==
=== 13–14th classification match ===
15 August 2026 13–14 place	Bnei Sakhnin	1–0	Hapoel Petah Tikva	Sakhnin
20:15	Cudjoe 50'			Stadium: Doha Stadium; Referee: David Foxman

=== 11–12th classification match ===
15 August 2026 11–12 place	Ironi Tiberias	0–3	Maccabi Petah Tikva	Nof HaGalil
20:15			47' Hazan; 79' Cohen; 84' Cortés	Stadium: Barel Stadium; Referee: Gal Leibovich

=== 9–10th classification match ===
17 August 2026 9–10 place	Maccabi Haifa	0–1	Hapoel Jerusalem	Haifa
20:00			61' Dappa	Stadium: Sammy Ofer Stadium; Attendance: 5,142; Referee: Dekel Zino

=== 7–8th classification match ===
17 August 2026 7–8 place	Hapoel Ramat Gan	3–3 (4–5 p)	Beitar Jerusalem	Rehovot
20:00	Asanka 15'; Mijailovic 58'; Semel 90+2'		7' Gadrani; 36' Ansah; 90+4' Markovich	Stadium: Rehovot Stadium; Referee: Nael Odeh
	Penalties
	Semel (penalty scored); Oli (penalty missed); Noubissi (penalty scored); Glazer (penalty scored); Asanka (penalty scored)		(penalty scored) Shedo; (penalty scored) Antwi; (penalty scored) Markovich; (penalty scored) Deri; (penalty scored) Dahan

=== 5–6th classification match ===
15 August 2026 5–6 place	Hapoel Haifa	4–0	Hapoel Be'er Sheva	Haifa
20:30	Elias 29'; Rotman 33', 67'; Turgeman 52'			Stadium: Sammy Ofer Stadium; Referee: Gal Levi

== Semi-finals ==
16 August 2026 Semi-final	Maccabi Netanya	0–1	Maccabi Tel Aviv	Netanya
20:00			17' Varela	Stadium: Miriam Stadium; Referee: Aviad Shiloah

16 August 2026 Semi-final	Ironi Kiryat Shmona	1–2	Hapoel Tel Aviv	Petah Tikva
20:00	Ugarriza 6'		90+7', 90+9' Dappa	Stadium: HaMoshava Stadium; Referee: Yoni Klez

== Final ==
29 October 2026 Final	Maccabi Tel Aviv	2–3	Hapoel Tel Aviv	Tel Aviv
20:30	Peretz 89', 90+1'		18' Alkukin; 75' (pen.) Altman; 83' Dappa	Stadium: Bloomfield Stadium; Referee: Snir Levi

== Final rankings ==
R	Team
1st place, gold medalist(s)	Hapoel Tel Aviv
2nd place, silver medalist(s)	Maccabi Tel Aviv
3rd place, bronze medalist(s)	Ironi Kiryat Shmona
3rd place, bronze medalist(s)	Maccabi Netanya
5	Hapoel Haifa
6	Hapoel Be'er Sheva
7	Beitar Jerusalem
8	Hapoel Ramat Gan
9	Hapoel Jerusalem
10	Maccabi Haifa
11	Maccabi Petah Tikva
12	Ironi Tiberias
13	Bnei Sakhnin
14	Hapoel Petah Tikva
