= Omri Altman =

Israeli association footballer

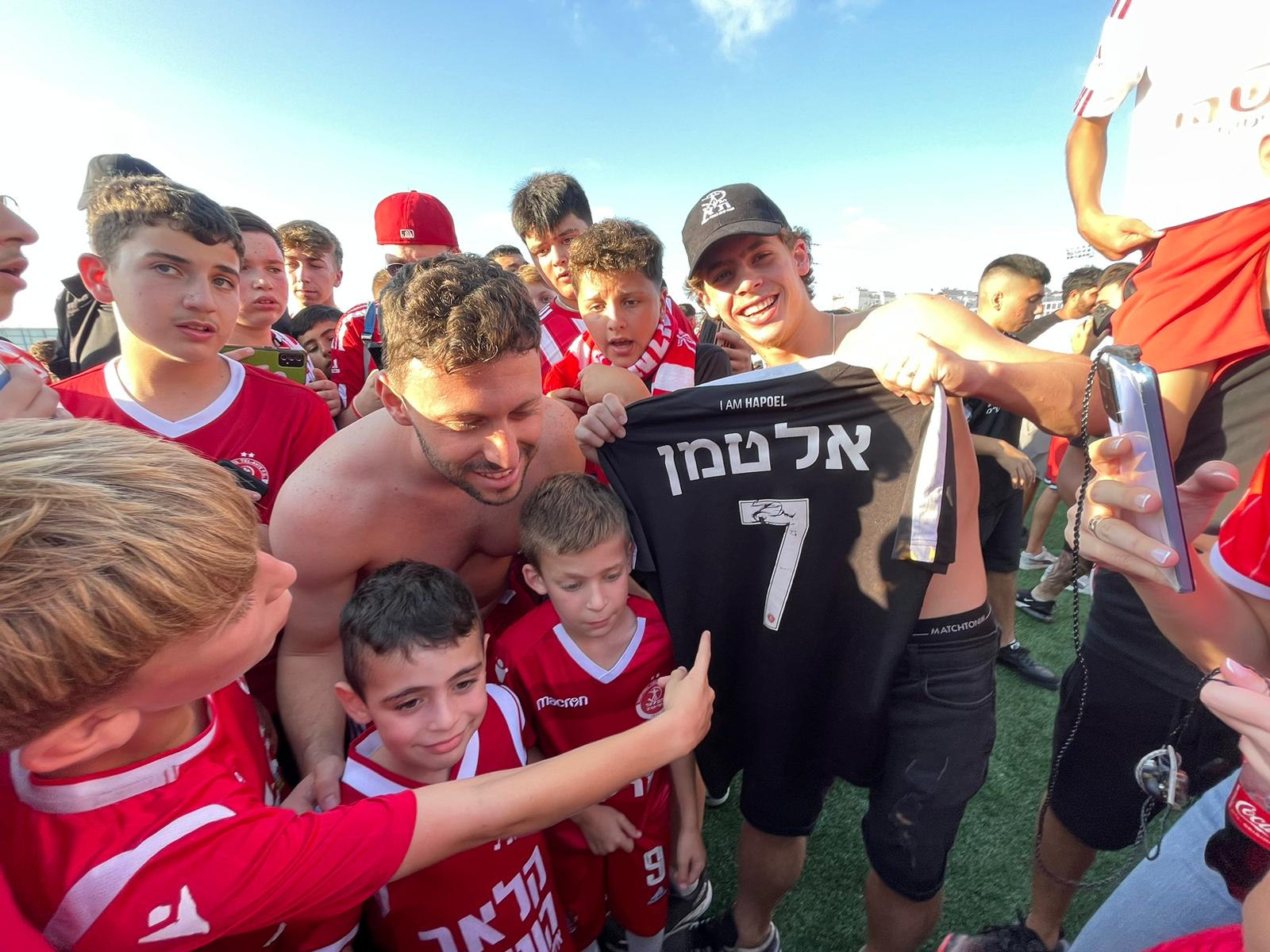
- Altman poses with fans in 2023

Personal information
- Date of birth: 23 March 1994 (age 32)
- Place of birth: Ramat Gan, Israel
- Height: 1.81 m (5 ft 11 in)
- Position: Attacking midfielder

Team information
- Current team: Hapoel Tel Aviv
- Number: 51

Youth career
- Hapoel Tel Aviv
- 2005–2011: Maccabi Tel Aviv
- 2011–2013: Fulham

Senior career*
| Years | Team | Apps | (Gls) |
| 2013–2015 | Maccabi Tel Aviv | 11 | (0) |
| 2014–2015 | → Hapoel Petah Tikva (loan) | 29 | (4) |
| 2015–2017 | Hapoel Tel Aviv | 54 | (8) |
| 2017–2019 | Panathinaikos | 30 | (4) |
| 2019–2021 | Hapoel Tel Aviv | 62 | (18) |
| 2021–2022 | Arouca | 5 | (0) |
| 2022–2023 | AEK Larnaca | 36 | (10) |
| 2023– | Hapoel Tel Aviv | 54 | (14) |
| 2024–2025 | → Volos (loan) | 14 | (0) |
| 2025 | → Maccabi Bnei Reineh (loan) | 10 | (4) |

International career^{‡}
| 2010 | Israel U16 | 2 | (0) |
| 2010–2011 | Israel U17 | 13 | (2) |
| 2011 | Israel U18 | 2 | (0) |
| 2011–2012 | Israel U19 | 16 | (1) |
| 2013–2016 | Israel U21 | 18 | (8) |
| 2022– | Israel | 3 | (0) |
- * Club domestic league appearances and goals as of 23 June 2026 ‡ National team caps and goals as of 8 June 2024

Omri Altman (Hebrew: עומרי אלטמן; born 23 March 1994) is an Israeli professional footballer who plays as an attacking midfielder for Israeli Premier League club Hapoel Tel Aviv and the Israel national team.

== Early life ==
Altman was born in Ramat Gan, Israel, to a family of Ashkenazi Jewish (Hungarian-Jewish) descent.

He also holds a Hungarian passport, on account of his Ashkenazi Jewish ancestry, which eases the move to certain European football leagues.

== Club career ==
=== Youth career ===
Altman joined the youth squad of Israeli club Maccabi Tel Aviv at the age of 11. His good performances attracted interest from Premier League clubs and earned him a move to English club Fulham in 2011.

=== Senior career ===
On 27 June 2013, Altman was loaned back to Israeli Premier League club Maccabi Tel Aviv. On 17 July 2013, Altman made his first ever official appearance with the senior team of Maccabi in an important match against Győri ETO FC in the 2013–14 UEFA Champions League qualifying rounds. On 20 October 2013, he made his league debut in a 1–0 victory against Ironi Ramat HaSharon.

On 19 June 2015, he signed with Hapoel Tel Aviv for five years.

=== Panathinaikos ===
On 28 June 2017, Altman signed a three-year contract with Panathinaikos from Hapoel Tel Aviv for a transfer fee of approximately €150,000. On 17 September 2017, he scored with a header the only goal in a 1–0 home win against Apollon Smyrnis. The Israeli youth international was brought to the club as a virtual unknown from Hapoel Tel Aviv for a fee in the region of €150,000. This highlights the severe financial constraints impacting Marinos Ouzounidis. The attacking midfielder, however, has done relatively well barring an injury that kept him out for some time. His two goals in the first half of the season came in a home win against Apollon Smyrnis and in a draw away against Xanthi.

On 4 March 2018, Altman suffered cruciate ligament injury during the Panathinaikos' away derby clash against Olympiacos which resulted in him missing the remainder of the 2017–18 season. His return was initially penciled in for September or October 2018, but it got delayed as he returned to his native Israel for further treatment. On 21 January 2019, after a very difficult period for the midfielder marred by injury (313 days to be exact) he returned to the squad in a 1–0 away loss against Lamia. On 16 February 2019, a month after his return he scored after a great pass from captain Dimitrios Kourbelis which Altman chested the ball down superbly before firing a powerful shot beyond Nikos Papadopoulos from the edge of the penalty area, sealing a 1–0 home win game against Asteras Tripolis.

=== Return to Hapoel ===
On 14 July 2019, Altman returned to Hapoel Tel Aviv.

=== Arouca ===
In September 2021, Altman joined Portuguese club Arouca.

=== AEK Larnaca ===
In January 2022, Altman signed with Cypriot club AEK Larnaca for 2.5 years.

=== Hapoel Tel Aviv ===
On 14 June 2023 returned to Hapoel Tel Aviv and signed for 3 years.

== International career ==
Altman made his debut for the Israel national football team on 27 September 2022 in a friendly game against Malta.

== Honours ==
=== Clubs ===
Maccabi Tel Aviv

- Israeli Premier League: 2013–14

Hapoel Tel Aviv

- Israeli Toto Cup (of Ligat HaAl): 2026–27

== See also ==
- List of Jewish footballers
- List of Jews in sports
- List of Israelis
