= 1998–99 Toto Cup Leumit =

Toto Cup Leumit
- Season: 1998–99
- Champions: Maccabi Tel Aviv (2nd Title)

The 1998–99 Toto Cup Leumit was the 15th season of the third most important football tournament in Israel since its introduction.

It was held in two stages. First, sixteen Liga Leumit teams were divided into four groups. The group winners advanced to the semi-finals, which, as were the final held as one-legged matches.

The competition began on 15 August 1998 and ended on 2 February 1999, with Maccabi Tel Aviv beating Beitar Jerusalem 2–1 in the final.

== Group stage ==
The matches were played from 15 August 1998 to 23 January 1999.

=== Group A ===
Pos	Team	Pld	W	D	L	GF	GA	GD	Pts	BEI	MPT	HPT	HBN
1	Beitar Jerusalem (A)	6	5	0	1	15	5	+10	15	—	3–0	2–1	4–0
2	Maccabi Petah Tikva	6	3	0	3	10	9	+1	9	2–3	—	0–1	3–0
3	Hapoel Petah Tikva	6	2	0	4	7	11	−4	6	0–2	1–3	—	1–0
4	Hapoel Beit She'an	6	2	0	4	7	14	−7	6	2–1	1–2	4–3	—

Source: rsssf.com (in Hebrew)
Rules for classification: 1st points; 2nd goal difference; 3rd matches won; 4th goals scored; 5th head-to-head; 6th decision match
(A) Advanced to semifinals

=== Group B ===
Pos	Team	Pld	W	D	L	GF	GA	GD	Pts	MTA	HTA	BnY	HRL
1	Maccabi Tel Aviv (A)	6	6	0	0	25	2	+23	18	—	2–0	6–0	8–1
2	Hapoel Tel Aviv	6	3	0	3	8	9	−1	9	1–2	—	3–1	2–1
3	Bnei Yehuda	6	2	0	4	8	15	−7	6	0–1	2–0	—	3–2
4	Hapoel Rishon LeZion	6	1	0	5	8	23	−15	3	0–6	1–2	3–2	—

Source: rsssf.com (in Hebrew)
Rules for classification: 1st points; 2nd goal difference; 3rd matches won; 4th goals scored; 5th head-to-head; 6th decision match
(A) Advanced to semifinals

=== Group C ===
Pos	Team	Pld	W	D	L	GF	GA	GD	Pts	HHA	HKS	HJE	MJF
1	Hapoel Haifa (A)	6	5	1	0	14	5	+9	16	—	2–1	3–2	4–0
2	Hapoel Kfar Saba	6	2	2	2	7	7	0	8	0–2	—	1–1	1–1
3	Hapoel Jerusalem	6	1	2	3	9	11	−2	5	1–1	0–2	—	4–2
4	Maccabi Jaffa	6	1	1	4	7	14	−7	4	1–2	1–2	2–1	—

Source: rsssf.com (in Hebrew)
Rules for classification: 1st points; 2nd goal difference; 3rd matches won; 4th goals scored; 5th head-to-head; 6th decision match
(A) Advanced to semifinals

=== Group D ===
Pos	Team	Pld	W	D	L	GF	GA	GD	Pts	HTZ	MHA	MHE	MIA
1	Hapoel Tzafririm Holon (A)	6	3	2	1	12	7	+5	11	—	1–1	2–0	2–0
2	Maccabi Haifa	6	3	1	2	12	8	+4	10	0–2	—	3–1	3–0
3	Maccabi Herzliya	6	2	1	3	13	13	0	7	1–1	2–4	—	6–2
4	Maccabi Ironi Ashdod	6	2	0	4	10	19	−9	6	5–4	2–1	1–3	—

Source: rsssf.com (in Hebrew)
Rules for classification: 1st points; 2nd goal difference; 3rd matches won; 4th goals scored; 5th head-to-head; 6th decision match
(A) Advanced to semifinals

== Elimination rounds ==
=== Semifinals ===
26 January 1999	Beitar Jerusalem	3–2	Hapoel Haifa	Ramat Gan
	Shelach 24'; Shitrit 50' (pen.), 59'		Roso 73' (pen.); Nissim 88'	Stadium: Ramat Gan Stadium

26 January 1999	Maccabi Tel Aviv	3–1	Hapoel Tzafririm Holon	Ramat Gan
	Tzarfati 1'; Kubica 23'; Nimni 60'		Daraselia 45'	Stadium: Ramat Gan Stadium

=== Final ===
2 February 1999

Beitar Jerusalem	1–2 (a.e.t.)	Maccabi Tel Aviv
Hamar 43'	Video summary	Nimni 83', 101'

Ramat Gan Stadium
Attendance: 12,000
Referee: Nir Ba'abur

== See also ==
- 1998–99 Toto Cup Artzit
