= Wonderson Yakubu =

Nigerian footballer

Wonderson Yakubu וונדרסון יעקובו
Personal information
- Full name: Wonderson Babas Yakubu
- Date of birth: 12 March 2007 (age 19)
- Place of birth: Nigeria
- Height: 1.83 m (6 ft 0 in)
- Position: Forward

Team information
- Current team: Hapoel Ra'anana
- Number: 30

Youth career
- Niger Tornadoes

Senior career*
Years	Team	Apps	(Gls)
2025	Niger Tornadoes	0	(0)
2025	→ Wikki Tourists (loan)	2	(4)
2025	→ Hapoel Ra'anana (loan)	13	(5)
2026–	Hapoel Ra'anana	13	(4)
- * Club domestic league appearances and goals as of 24 June 2026

Wonderson Babas Yakubu (born 12 March 2007) is a Nigerian professional footballer who plays as a forward for Liga Leumit club Hapoel Ra'anana.

== Club career ==
=== Hapoel Ra'anana ===
Ahead of the 2025–26 season, Yakubu signed with Hapoel Ra'anana from Liga Leumit on a one-year loan from Niger Tornadoes. On 16 August 2025, Yakubu began his spell at Hapoel Ra'anana with the Israeli Noar Premier League, scoring twice in a 3–1 victory over Hapoel Acre. On 18 August, Yakubu made his senior debut for Hapoel Ra'anana in a 0–1 loss to Bnei Yehuda Tel Aviv at the Goodman Stadium in the Toto Cup of Liga Leumit. On 31 August, Yakubu made his Liga Leumit debut in a 0–1 loss to Maccabi Herzliya at the Levita Stadium. On 21 September, Yakubu scored his first goal in a 1–1 draw against Hapoel Kfar Saba at the Levita Stadium.
