= Ben Luz =

Israeli footballer

Ben Luz בן לוז
Personal information
- Date of birth: February 18, 1978 (age 48)
- Place of birth: Israel
- Height: 1.71 m (5 ft 7 in)
- Positions: Midfielder; attacking midfielder

Senior career*
Years	Team	Apps	(Gls)
1994–2000	Maccabi Tel Aviv	80	(3)
2000–2001	Hapoel Haifa	7	(0)
2001	Bnei Yehuda	20	(5)
2001–2003	Hapoel Tel Aviv	63	(15)
2003–2006	Bnei Yehuda	55	(12)
2006–2008	Hapoel Kfar Saba	66	(9)
2008–2009	Hapoel Tel Aviv	23	(3)
2009	Hapoel Ramat Gan	6	(0)

International career
1999	Israel U-21	1	(0)
2003	Israel	2	(0)
- * Club domestic league appearances and goals as of 15 January 2009

Ben Luz (Hebrew: בן לוז; born 18 February 1978) is a retired Israeli footballer.

== Honours ==
- Israeli Premier League (2):
  - 1994-95, 1995-96
- Toto Cup (2):
  - 1998-99, 2001–02
