= 1998–99 Toto Cup Artzit =

Toto Cup Artzit
- Season: 1998–99
- Champions: Hakoah Ramat Gan (3rd title)

The 1998–99 Toto Cup Artzit was the 15th season of the second tier League Cup (as a separate competition) since its introduction. This was the last season that the competition was run separately for the second tier until 2004–05.

It was held in two stages. First, the 16 Liga Artzit teams were divided into four groups. The group winners advanced to the semi-finals, which, as was the final, were held as one-legged matches.

The competition was won by Hakoah Ramat Gan, who had beaten Bnei Sakhnin 2–0 in the final.

== Group stage ==
=== Group A ===
Pos	Team	Pld	W	D	L	GF	GA	GD	Pts	Result	BnS	HAS	MKK	MNE
1	Bnei Sakhnin	6	4	0	2	7	6	+1	12	Advanced	—	1–0	0–1	2–1
2	Hapoel Ashkelon	6	3	2	1	9	6	+3	11		2–0	—	1–1	3–2
3	Maccabi Kafr Kanna	6	2	3	1	7	5	+2	9		1–2	1–1	—	2–0
4	Maccabi Netanya	6	0	1	5	6	12	−6	1		1–2	1–2	1–1	—

Source: Israel Cup 1998/99
Rules for classification: 1st points; 2nd goal difference; 3rd matches won; 4th goals scored; 5th head-to-head; 6th decision match.
Colours: Blue = home team win; Yellow = draw; Red = away team win.

=== Group B ===
Pos	Team	Pld	W	D	L	GF	GA	GD	Pts	Result	SNT	HBS	BTA	HLD
1	Sektzia Nes Tziona	6	5	0	1	10	5	+5	15	Advanced	—	2–1	2–1	2–1
2	Hapoel Be'er Sheva	6	3	1	2	6	4	+2	9		2–0	—	2–0^{2}	0–0^{2}
3	Beitar Tel Aviv	6	2	0	4	6	9	−3	6		0–2^{2}	0–1	—	3–1
4	Hapoel Lod	6	1	1	4	5	9	−4	3		0–2^{2}	2–0	1–2	—

Source: Israel Cup 1998/99
Rules for classification: 1st points; 2nd goal difference; 3rd matches won; 4th goals scored; 5th head-to-head; 6th decision match.

^{2} During the first two rounds, Beitar Tel Aviv, Hapoel Lod (during both rounds) and Hapoel Be'er Sheva (during the first round) were barred from playing due to budget problems. The first round match between Hapoel Lod and Hapoel Be'er Sheva was given as a 0–0 without points awarded, and the rest of the cancelled matches were awarded to the opposing team.

Colours: Blue = home team win; Yellow = draw; Red = away team win.

=== Group C ===
Pos	Team	Pld	W	D	L	GF	GA	GD	Pts	Result	MAN	HBY	MAC	HAD
1	Maccabi Ahi Nazareth	6	4	1	1	13	8	+5	13	Advanced	—	4–3	2–1	1–1
2	Hapoel Bat Yam	6	3	0	3	11	9	+2	9		2–1	—	4–1	0–1
3	Maccabi Acre	6	3	0	3	9	9	0	9		0–3	1–0	—	3–0
4	Hapoel Ashdod	6	1	1	4	4	11	−7	4		1–2	1–2	0–3	—

Source: Israel Cup 1998/99
Rules for classification: 1st points; 2nd goal difference; 3rd matches won; 4th goals scored; 5th head-to-head; 6th decision match.
Colours: Blue = home team win; Yellow = draw; Red = away team win.

=== Group D ===
Pos	Team	Pld	W	D	L	GF	GA	GD	Pts	Result	HMR	BBS	MKG	HTY
1	Hakoah Amidar Ramat Gan	6	3	2	1	15	9	+6	11	Advanced	—	0–1	4–4	2–0^{2}
2	Beitar Be'er Sheva	6	3	2	1	9	8	+1	11		1–4	—	2–0^{2}	0–0
3	Maccabi Kiryat Gat	6	1	2	3	10	14	−4	4		2–4	1–2	—	3–2
4	Hapoel Tayibe	6	0	4	2	6	9	−3	3		1–1	3–3	0–0^{2}	—

Source: Israel Cup 1998/99
Rules for classification: 1st points; 2nd goal difference; 3rd matches won; 4th goals scored; 5th head-to-head; 6th decision match.

^{2} During the first two rounds, Hapoel Tayibe and Maccabi Kiryat Gat were barred from playing due to budget problems. The first round match between the teams was given as a 0–0 without points awarded, and both teams' second round matches were awarded to the opposing team.

Colours: Blue = home team win; Yellow = draw; Red = away team win.

== Elimination rounds ==
=== Semifinals ===
Home team	Score	Away team
Bnei Sakhnin	1–0	Maccabi Ahi Nazareth
Sektzia Nes Tziona	0–3	Hakoah Ramat Gan

=== Final ===
2 February 1999

Bnei Sakhnin	0–2 (a.e.t.)	Hakoah Ramat Gan
		Hadad 100'; Poderis 118'

Ramat Gan Stadium

== See also ==
- 1998–99 Toto Cup Leumit
