= Yoav Koren =

Israeli association footballer (born 2004)

Personal information
- Full name: Yoav Koren
- Date of birth: 14 November 2005 (age 21)
- Place of birth: Israel
- Height: 1.80 m (5 ft 11 in)
- Position: Winger

Team information
- Current team: Maccabi Petah Tikva

Youth career
- 2013–2016: Bnei Yehuda
- 2016–2025: Hapoel Ramat HaSharon

Senior career*
Years	Team	Apps	(Gls)
2024–2025	Hapoel Ramat HaSharon	13	(1)
2025–	Hapoel Be'er Sheva	0	(0)
2025–2026	→ Hapoel Kfar Saba	27	(5)
2026–	→ Maccabi Petah Tikva	5	(1)

International career^{‡}
2026–	Israel U21	1	(0)
- * Club domestic league appearances and goals as of 16:02, 17 November 2026 (UTC) ‡ National team caps and goals as of 23:06, 31 July 2026 (UTC)

Yoav Koren (Hebrew: יואב קורן; born 14 November 2005) is an Israeli professional footballer who plays as a Winger for Israeli Premier League club Maccabi Petah Tikva and the Israel U21, on loan from Hapoel Be'er Sheva and plays in the Israeli Premier League.

== Club career ==
=== Hapoel Be'er Sheva ===
On 25 August 2025, Koren signed a five-year contract with Hapoel Be'er Sheva after being transferred from Hapoel Ramat HaSharon for a fee of 225,000 NIS. As part of the agreement, Hapoel Ramat HaSharon retained a 20% sell-on clause on any future transfer.

Loan to Hapoel Kfar Saba

On 18 August 2025, Koren was loaned to Hapoel Kfar Saba of the Liga Leumit for one season. On the same day, he made his debut for the club in a Toto Cup match of the Liga Leumit against Hapoel Kfar Shalem, scoring twice in a 4–3 defeat. During the league season, Koren made 27 appearances, scoring five goals.

Loan to Maccabi Petah Tikva

On 17 August 2026, Koren joined Israeli Premier League club Maccabi Petah Tikva on a one-season loan.

== International career ==
On 17 March 2026, Koren received his first call-up to the Israel U21 by head coach Guy Luzon ahead of the match against Hungary U21. On 26 March, he made his debut for the Israel U21 in a 1–0 victory over Hungary U21, coming on as a substitute at half-time.

== See also ==
- List of Israelis
- List of Israel international footballers
