= 2023–24 Liga Leumit =

Liga Leumit
- Season: 2023–24
- Dates: 24 August 2023 – 24 May 2024
- Champions: Ironi Kiryat Shmona
- Promoted: Ironi Kiryat Shmona; Ironi Tiberias
- Relegated: Ihud Bnei Shefa-'Amr; Sektzia Ness Ziona

The 2023–24 Liga Leumit is the 25th season as second tier since its realignment in 1999 and the 82nd season of second-tier football in Israel.

== Teams ==
A total of sixteen teams are contesting in the league, including twelve sides from the 2022–23 season, the two promoted teams from Liga Alef and the two relegated teams from 2022–23 Israeli Premier League.

=== Team changes ===
The following teams have changed division since the 2022–23 season.

==== To Liga Leumit ====
===== Promoted from Liga Alef =====
- Maccabi Herzliya (South Division)
- Ihud Bnei Shefa-'Amr (North Division)

===== Relegated from Premier League =====
- Ironi Kiryat Shmona
- Sektzia Nes Tziona

==== From Liga Leumit ====
===== Promoted to Premier League =====
- Maccabi Petah Tikva
- Hapoel Petah Tikva

===== Relegated to Liga Alef =====
- A.S. Ashdod
- Maccabi Ahi Nazareth

=== Stadia and locations ===
Club	Home City	Stadium	Capacity
Bnei Yehuda Tel Aviv	Tel Aviv	Bloomfield Stadium	29,400
F.C. Kafr Qasim	Kafr Qasim	HaMoshava Stadium (Note: Play their home games at a neutral venue because their own ground does not meet league requirements.)	11,500
Hapoel Acre	Acre	Acre Municipal Stadium	5,000
Hapoel Afula	Afula	Afula Illit Stadium	3,000
Hapoel Kfar Saba	Kfar Saba	Levita Stadium	5,800
Hapoel Nof HaGalil	Nof HaGalil	Green Stadium	5,200
Hapoel Ramat Gan	Ramat Gan	Ramat Gan Stadium	13,370
Hapoel Ramat HaSharon	Ramat HaSharon	Grundman Stadium	4,300
Hapoel Rishon LeZion	Rishon LeZion	Haberfeld Stadium	6,000
Hapoel Umm al-Fahm	Umm al-Fahm	HaShalom Stadium	5,800
Ihud Bnei Shefa-'Amr	Shefa-'Amr	Ilut Stadium	4,932
Ironi Kiryat Shmona	Kiryat Shmona	Kiryat Shmona Stadium	5,300
Ironi Tiberias	Tiberias	Afula Illit Stadium	3,000
Maccabi Jaffa	Tel Aviv	Ness Ziona Stadium	3,500
Maccabi Herzliya	Herzliya	Netanya Stadium	13,610
Sektzia Ness Ziona	Ness Ziona	Ness Ziona Stadium	3,500

== Regular season ==
=== League table ===
Pos	Team	Pld	W	D	L	GF	GA	GD	Pts	Qualification
1	Bnei Yehuda	30	19	4	7	57	36	+21	61	Qualification for the Promotion Round
2	Ironi Kiryat Shmona	30	19	3	8	50	19	+31	60	Qualification for the Promotion Round
3	Ironi Tiberias	30	14	12	4	46	28	+18	54	Qualification for the Promotion Round
4	Maccabi Jaffa	30	14	8	8	58	40	+18	50	Qualification for the Promotion Round
5	Hapoel Nof HaGalil	30	13	8	9	46	34	+12	47	Qualification for the Promotion Round
6	Hapoel Ramat HaSharon	30	12	9	9	55	48	+7	45	Qualification for the Promotion Round
7	Hapoel Umm al-Fahm	30	10	12	8	38	34	+4	42	Qualification for the Promotion Round
8	Maccabi Herzliya	30	11	9	10	34	41	−7	42	Qualification for the Promotion Round
9	Hapoel Acre	30	10	11	9	41	40	+1	41	Qualification for the Relegation Round
10	F.C. Kafr Qasim	30	9	10	11	31	39	−8	37	Qualification for the Relegation Round
11	Hapoel Rishon LeZion	30	9	8	13	27	39	−12	35	Qualification for the Relegation Round
12	Sektzia Ness Ziona	30	9	7	14	38	53	−15	34	Qualification for the Relegation Round
13	Hapoel Ramat Gan	30	8	10	12	36	35	+1	34	Qualification for the Relegation Round
14	Hapoel Kfar Saba	30	7	10	13	27	40	−13	31	Qualification for the Relegation Round
15	Hapoel Afula	30	5	9	16	33	53	−20	24	Qualification for the Relegation Round
16	Ihud Bnei Shefa-'Amr (Note: Ihud Bnei Shefa-'Amr were deducted 2 points)	30	4	4	22	27	66	−39	14	Qualification for the Relegation Round

Source: Soccerway
Rules for classification: 1) points; 2) goal difference; 3) number of wins; 4) goals scored; 5) head to head; 6) deciding match.

=== Results ===
Home \ Away	BNY	FKQ	HAC	HAF	HKS	HNG	HRG	HRS	HRL	HUF	IBS	IKS	ITI	MHE	MJA	SNZ
Bnei Yehuda	—	1–0	3–4	4–2	4–1	1–0	0–5	3–1	3–0	3–1	0–1	1–0	4–1	3–0	2–1	2–1
F.C. Kafr Qasim	1–0	—	1–2	1–1	2–3	1–1	0–0	0–3	1–1	1–0	3–1	0–1	1–2	0–3	2–1	2–0
Hapoel Acre	2–1	3–1	—	1–0	0–1	1–3	0–3	0–0	3–3	2–2	1–1	2–1	1–1	2–3	4–1	1–1
Hapoel Afula	1–1	1–1	1–0	—	1–3	2–2	2–3	0–1	3–1	1–1	1–3	0–2	1–1	0–1	0–2	1–2
Hapoel Kfar Saba	3–3	0–0	1–2	0–2	—	2–3	1–0	1–1	0–1	2–0	1–0	0–0	0–4	0–1	1–4	2–2
Hapoel Nof HaGalil	2–2	3–0	2–0	2–1	1–0	—	0–0	1–0	0–2	5–2	5–0	2–1	1–1	1–0	2–1	1–2
Hapoel Ramat Gan	1–2	1–1	0–0	5–2	0–0	0–1	—	2–3	1–0	1–1	1–0	0–1	0–0	1–1	0–1	5–1
Hapoel Ramat HaSharon	1–3	2–2	2–2	1–3	2–1	1–1	3–1	—	1–0	1–1	6–3	2–1	0–2	0–0	0–4	5–2
Hapoel Rishon LeZion	0–2	0–2	2–0	1–0	0–0	1–0	2–1	3–2	—	1–1	1–1	0–2	1–3	1–2	0–2	1–1
Hapoel Umm al-Fahm	1–2	1–1	0–0	1–1	1–1	2–1	4–0	3–2	3–1	—	1–3	3–1	0–0	2–0	1–1	0–2
Ihud Bnei Shefa-'Amr	1–2	1–2	0–1	0–0	1–2	3–2	0–1	0–5	0–1	2–1	—	0–2	1–2	0–2	0–3	3–3
Ironi Kiryat Shmona	1–0	0–0	1–0	4–0	1–0	0–2	2–0	3–0	3–0	0–2	2–1	—	1–2	5–1	5–1	1–0
Ironi Tiberias	1–2	5–1	1–1	0–2	1–1	2–0	1–0	2–2	2–1	0–0	3–0	1–0	—	2–2	0–1	1–0
Maccabi Herzliya	3–1	1–1	1–4	2–1	1–0	1–0	1–1	1–3	0–0	1–2	2–1	0–2	1–1	—	0–3	1–1
Maccabi Jaffa	0–0	0–1	2–2	5–1	1–1	3–2	3–3	2–2	1–2	2–0	4–1	0–5	1–1	1–1	—	5–1
Sektzia Ness Ziona	0–2	1–3	1–0	2–2	1–0	2–0	2–0	1–3	2–1	0–2	4–1	0–1	2–3	2–1	0–2	—

Source: Soccerway
Legend: Blue = home team win; Yellow = draw; Red = away team win.

== Promotion playoffs ==
Pos	Team	Pld	W	D	L	GF	GA	GD	Pts	Qualification or relegation	IKS	ITI	BNY	HNG	MJA	HRS	MHE	HUF
1	Ironi Kiryat Shmona (C, P)	37	24	4	9	66	23	+43	76	Promoted to Israeli Premier League		2–0		0–2			5–0	2–1
2	Ironi Tiberias (P)	37	20	12	5	62	34	+28	72	Promoted to Israeli Premier League			2–0	1–0	4–2	3–1		
3	Bnei Yehuda	37	22	6	9	71	45	+26	72		0–0			1–3	3–1	2–0		
4	Hapoel Nof HaGalil	37	18	9	10	62	39	+23	63							2–0	5–0	2–1
5	Maccabi Jaffa	37	14	9	14	68	62	+6	51		0–3			2–2			2–3	1–3
6	Hapoel Ramat HaSharon	37	13	11	13	64	64	0	50		1–4				4–2			2–2
7	Maccabi Herzliya	37	13	11	13	43	61	−18	50			1–4	2–2			1–1		
8	Hapoel Umm al-Fahm	37	11	14	12	47	51	−4	47			0–2	1–6				1–2	

Updated to match(es) played on 7 May 2024. Source: Soccerway
Legend: Blue = home team win; Yellow = draw; Red = away team win.
Rules for classification: 1) points; 2) goal difference; 3) number of wins; 4) goals scored; 5) head to head; 6) deciding match.
(C) Champions; (P) Promoted

== Relegation playoffs ==
Pos	Team	Pld	W	D	L	GF	GA	GD	Pts	Qualification or relegation	HAC	FKQ	HRG	HAF	HRL	HKS	SNZ	IBS
9	Hapoel Acre	37	12	14	11	54	49	+5	50			5–2	1–2			0–1	0–0	
10	F.C. Kafr Qasim	37	12	11	14	44	50	−6	47					0–1	2–0		0–1	8–4
11	Hapoel Ramat Gan	37	11	11	15	47	43	+4	44			0–1		0–1			3–1	3–0
12	Hapoel Afula	37	11	10	16	44	54	−10	43		1–1				2–0			3–0
13	Hapoel Rishon LeZion	37	11	10	16	37	48	−11	43		1–1		2–1			1–2	1–1	
14	Hapoel Kfar Saba (A)	37	10	12	15	36	47	−11	42	Qualification for the Promotion/relegation playoff		0–0	2–2	0–1				
15	Sektzia Ness Ziona (R)	37	10	10	17	44	63	−19	40	Relegated to Liga Alef				0–2		1–2		2–2
16	Ihud Bnei Shefa-'Amr (Note: Ihud Bnei Shefa-'Amr were deducted 2 points) (R)	37	5	5	27	37	93	−56	18	Relegated to Liga Alef	2–5				0–5	2–1		

Updated to match(es) played on 7 May 2024. Source: Soccerway
Legend: Blue = home team win; Yellow = draw; Red = away team win.
Rules for classification: 1) points; 2) goal difference; 3) number of wins; 4) goals scored; 5) head to head; 6) deciding match.
(A) Advance to a further round; (R) Relegated

== Promotion/relegation playoff ==
The 14th-placed team faced Liga Alef promotion play-offs winner in a one game.

29 May 2024
20:00

Hapoel Kfar Saba	1-0	F.C. Tira
Sheikh Yosef 94'

HaMoshava Stadium, Petah Tikva
Referee: Orel Grinfeld
