= 1984–85 Toto Cup Artzit =

Toto Cup Artzit
- Season: 1984–85
- Champions: Hapoel Ashkelon

The 1984–85 Toto Cup Artzit was the 1st season of the second tier League Cup (as a separate competition) since its introduction.

It was held in two stages. First, the 16 Liga Artzit teams were divided into four groups. The group winners advanced to the semi-finals, which, as was the final, were held as one-legged matches.

The competition was won by Hapoel Ashkelon, who had beaten Bnei Yehuda 2–0 in the final.

== Group stage ==
The matches were played from 30 October 1984 to 6 April 1985.

=== Group A ===
Pos	Team	Pld	W	D	L	GF	GA	GD	Pts	Qualification
1	Bnei Yehuda	6	5	1	0	16	1	+15	16	Advanced to the Quarterfinals
2	Beitar Haifa	6	3	0	3	10	12	−2	9	
3	Hapoel Hadera	6	2	1	3	7	9	−2	7	
4	Hapoel Marmorek	6	1	0	5	5	16	−11	3	

Source: Yeditoh Aharonot, 6 April 1985 (in Hebrew)
Rules for classification: 1st points; 2nd goal difference; 3rd matches won; 4th goals scored; 5th head-to-head; 6th decision match

=== Group B ===
Pos	Team	Pld	W	D	L	GF	GA	GD	Pts	Qualification
1	Hapoel Ashkelon	6	3	3	0	12	6	+6	12	Advanced to the Quarterfinals
2	Beitar Ramla	6	2	1	3	10	12	−2	7	
3	Hapoel Tiberias	6	1	3	2	4	5	−1	6	
4	Maccabi Ramat Amidar	6	1	3	2	8	11	−3	6	

Source: Yeditoh Aharonot, 6 April 1985 (in Hebrew)
Rules for classification: 1st points; 2nd goal difference; 3rd matches won; 4th goals scored; 5th head-to-head; 6th decision match

=== Group C ===
Pos	Team	Pld	W	D	L	GF	GA	GD	Pts	Qualification
1	Hapoel Holon	6	4	2	0	13	2	+11	14	Advanced to the Quarterfinals
2	Hapoel Ramat Gan	6	4	1	1	11	6	+5	13	
3	Maccabi Sha'arayim	6	1	1	4	12	16	−4	4	
4	Hapoel Yehud	6	0	2	4	6	18	−12	2	

Source: Yeditoh Aharonot, 6 April 1985 (in Hebrew)
Rules for classification: 1st points; 2nd goal difference; 3rd matches won; 4th goals scored; 5th head-to-head; 6th decision match

=== Group D ===
Pos	Team	Pld	W	D	L	GF	GA	GD	Pts	Qualification
1	Hapoel Rishon LeZion	6	4	0	2	13	10	+3	12	Advanced to the Quarterfinals
2	Hapoel Ramat HaSharon	6	3	1	2	10	7	+3	10	
3	Hapoel Kiryat Shmona	6	1	3	2	5	10	−5	6	
4	Hapoel Jerusalem	6	1	2	3	4	5	−1	5	

Source: Yeditoh Aharonot, 6 April 1985 (in Hebrew)
Rules for classification: 1st points; 2nd goal difference; 3rd matches won; 4th goals scored; 5th head-to-head; 6th decision match

== Elimination rounds ==
=== Semifinals ===
Team 1	Score	Team 2
Bnei Yehuda	2–2 (5–4 p)	Hapoel Holon
Hapoel Ashkelon	2–2 (4–3 p)	Hapoel Rishon LeZion

=== Final ===
7 May 1985

Bnei Yehuda	0–2 (a.e.t.)	Hapoel Ashkelon
		98' Levi; 111' Tubai

Ramat Gan Stadium
Attendance: 500
Referee: Yehoshua Loya

== See also ==
- 1984–85 Toto Cup Leumit
