= Oren Muharer =

Israeli footballer and manager

Oren Muharer אורן מוהרר
Personal information
- Full name: Oren Muharer
- Date of birth: March 16, 1971 (age 55)
- Place of birth: Kfar Saba, Israel
- Position: Striker

Senior career*
Years	Team	Apps	(Gls)
1987–1992	Hapoel Kfar Saba	128	(9)
1994–1995	Hapoel Petah Tikva	21	(3)
2000–2002	Bnei Sakhnin	57	(25)
2007–2008	Hapoel Hadera	37	(25)
2008–2010	Bnei Tayibe	48	(23)
2010	SC Kfar Kasem	2	(0)
2011	Maccabi HaSharon Netanya	3	(0)
2011–2012	Bnei Tayibe	6	(2)
2012–2013	F.C. Pardes Hanna	7	(2)
2013	Hapoel Hod HaSharon	3	(0)

Managerial career
- 2006–2009: Beitar Nes Tubruk
- 2009–2010: Bnei Tayibe
- 2010: Beitar Nes Tubruk
- 2010: SC Kfar Kasem
- 2010–2011: Maccabi HaSharon Netanya
- 2010–2011: Bnei Sakhnin (assistant manager)
- 2011–2012: Hapoel Ra'anana (assistant manager)
- 2011: Hapoel Aliyah Kfar Saba
- 2012–2013: Hapoel Hod HaSharon
- 2014–2015: Hapoel Aliyah Kfar Saba
- 2015–2016: Ironi Ariel
- 2016–2017: Bnei Tayibe
- * Club domestic league appearances and goals

Oren Muharer (Hebrew: אורן מוהרר; born March 16, 1971) is a retired Israeli footballer who now acts as the manager of Hapoel Aliyah Kfar Saba.

== Honours ==
- Liga Bet (2):
  - 2007-08, 2008–09
- Israel Beach Soccer League (3):
  - 2008, 2009, 2010
