= 2001–02 Toto Cup Artzit =

Toto Cup Artzit
- Season: 2001–02
- Champions: Hapoel Ashkelon

The 2001–02 Toto Cup Artzit was the 3rd time the cup was being contested as a competition for the third tier in the Israeli football league system.

The competition was won by Hapoel Ashkelon, who had beaten Ironi Kiryat Shmona 1–0 in the final. Hapoel Ashkelon had previously won the Toto Cup Artzit in 1985, however, at the time Liga Artzit was the second tier of the football league system.

== Group stage ==
=== Group A ===
Pos	Team	Pld	W	D	L	GF	GA	GD	Pts	IKA	HAS	HAC	HJE
1	Maccabi Kiryat Ata (A)	6	4	1	1	18	8	+10	13	—	3–0	5–2	3–1
2	Hapoel Ashkelon (A)	6	3	2	1	7	7	0	11	2–2	—	1–0	1–1
3	Hapoel Acre	6	3	0	3	11	11	0	9	3–2	0–1	—	4–1
4	Hapoel Jerusalem	6	0	1	5	5	15	−10	1	0–3	1–2	1–2	—

Source: RSSSF (in Hebrew)
Rules for classification: 1st points; 2nd goal difference; 3rd matches won; 4th goals scored; 5th head-to-head; 6th decision match
(A) Advanced to the Semifinals

=== Group B ===
Pos	Team	Pld	W	D	L	GF	GA	GD	Pts	IKS	HRH	HBY	HMJ
1	Ironi Kiryat Shmona (A)	6	4	0	2	11	7	+4	12	—	2–1	3–1	3–1
2	Hapoel Ramat HaSharon	6	3	1	2	14	8	+6	10	1–0	—	5–1	4–1
3	Hapoel Bat Yam	6	2	1	3	8	13	−5	7	2–1	2–2	—	2–1
4	Ihud Bnei Majd al-Krum	6	2	0	4	7	12	−5	6	1–2	2–1	1–0	—

Source: RSSSF (in Hebrew)
Rules for classification: 1st points; 2nd goal difference; 3rd matches won; 4th goals scored; 5th head-to-head; 6th decision match
(A) Advanced to the Semifinals

=== Group C ===
Pos	Team	Pld	W	D	L	GF	GA	GD	Pts	BST	MYA	HNI	HTY
1	Beitar Shimshon Tel Aviv (A)	6	3	2	1	8	3	+5	11	—	0–0	1–1	3–0
2	Maccabi Yavne	6	1	4	1	8	9	−1	7	1–0	—	2–2	3–3
3	Hapoel Nazareth Illit	6	1	4	1	8	9	−1	7	1–3	1–1	—	0–0
4	Hapoel Tayibe	6	1	2	3	7	10	−3	5	0–1	3–1	1–2	—

Source: RSSSF (in Hebrew)
Rules for classification: 1st points; 2nd goal difference; 3rd matches won; 4th goals scored; 5th head-to-head; 6th decision match
(A) Advanced to the Semifinals

== Semifinals ==
Home team	Score	Away team
Maccabi Ironi Kiryat Ata	2–5	Hapoel Ashkelon
Ironi Kiryat Shmona	3–2 (a.e.t.)	Beitar Shimshon Tel Aviv

== Final ==
12 March 2002

Hapoel Ashkelon	1–0 (a.e.t.)	Ironi Kiryat Shmona
Yitzhaki 94'

Herzliya Municipal Stadium

== See also ==
- Toto Cup
- 2001–02 Liga Artzit
