= Israel Dappa =

Israeli footballer (born 2009)

Personal information
- Date of birth: 31 January 2009 (age 17)
- Place of birth: Tel Aviv, Israel
- Position: Forward

Team information
- Current team: Hapoel Jerusalem
- Number: 33

Youth career
- Hapoel Jerusalem

Senior career*
Years	Team	Apps	(Gls)
2025–	Hapoel Jerusalem	14	(0)

International career^{‡}
2025–	Israel U19	5	(0)
- * Club domestic league appearances and goals as of 24 June 2026 ‡ National team caps and goals as of 14 October 2025

Israel Dappa (Hebrew: ישראל דאפא; born 31 January 2009) is an Israeli professional footballer who plays as a forward for Hapoel Jerusalem.

== Early life ==
Dappa was born on 31 January 2009 in Israel. Of Ghanaian descent through his parents, he is the younger brother of Israeli footballer Daniel Dappa.

== Club career ==
As a youth player, Dappa joined the youth academy of Hapoel Jerusalem and was promoted to the club's senior team in 2025. On 26 July 2025, he debuted for the club during a 1–0 home win over Hapoel Petah Tikva in the Toto Cup.

== International career ==
Dappa is an Israel youth international. During the autumn of 2025, he played for the Israel national under-19 football team for 2026 UEFA European Under-19 Championship qualification.
