= Daniel Dappa =

Israeli association football player

Daniel Dappa דניאל דאפה
Personal information
- Full name: Daniel Dappa
- Date of birth: 21 September 2007 (age 19)
- Place of birth: Tel Aviv, Israel
- Height: 1.80 m (5 ft 11 in)
- Position: Centre-forward

Team information
- Current team: Hapoel Tel Aviv
- Number: 44

Youth career
- 2020–2021: Hapoel Kfar Shalem
- 2021–2022: Bnei Yehuda
- 2022–2024: Maccabi Netanya

Senior career*
Years	Team	Apps	(Gls)
2024–2025	Maccabi Netanya	21	(4)
2025–	Hapoel Tel Aviv	33	(3)

International career^{‡}
2025–	Israel U19	3	(0)
2025–	Israel U21	1	(1)
- * Club domestic league appearances and goals as of 27 June 2025 ‡ National team caps and goals as of 27 June 2025

Daniel Dappa (Hebrew: דניאל דאפה; born 21 September 2007) is an Israeli professional footballer who plays as a centre forward for Israeli club Hapoel Tel Aviv and the Israel national under-19 team.

== Personal life ==
Dappa born and raised in Hatikva Quarter, Tel Aviv for parents of Ghanaian origin. He received an Israeli citizenship in December 2024.

His younger brother Israel Dappa plays for Hapoel Jerusalem.

== Club career ==
Dappa started his career for Hapoel Kfar Shalem under-14 team, where he scored 40 goals in one season. In summer 2021 he moved to Bnei Yehuda and one year later signed for Maccabi Netanya. On 10 August 2024, Dappa made his senior debut as a substitute in the 90th minute in a Toto Cup home match against Beitar Jerusalem, that ended in a 1–1 draw. On 5 January 2025 he scored his first goal in a senior match in the 1–0 away win against Ironi Kiryat Shmona.

== International career ==
Dappa was also eligible to play for Ghana, but chose to represent Israel.

On 19 March 2025 made his debut for the Israel national under-19 football team in the 2–3 loss to Serbia.

== Career statistics ==
=== Club ===
As of 23 June 2026.

Club	Season	League			State Cup		Toto Cup		Continental		Other		Total	
Club	Season	Division	Apps	Goals	Apps	Goals	Apps	Goals	Apps	Goals	Apps	Goals	Apps	Goals
Maccabi Netanya	2024–25	Israeli Premier League	21	4	1	0	1	0	–		0	0	23	4
Hapoel Tel Aviv	2025–26	Israeli Premier League	33	3	0	0	6	3	–		0	0	39	6
Career total			54	7	1	0	7	3	0	0	0	0	62	10
