= 2022–23 Toto Cup Leumit =

2022-23 Toto Cup Leumit
Tournament details
- Country: Israel
- Teams: 16

Final positions
- Champions: Beitar Tel Aviv Bat Yam (1st title)

The 2022–23 Toto Cup Leumit was the 33rd season of the second tier League Cup (as a separate competition) since its introduction. It was divided into two stages. First, the sixteen Liga Leumit teams were divided into four regionalized groups, the groups winners with the best record advancing to the semi-final, while the rest of the clubs were scheduled to play classification play-offs accordance according the group results.

Beitar Tel Aviv Bat Yam are the defending champions.

== Group stage ==
Groups were allocated according to geographic distribution of the clubs

=== Group A ===
Pos	Team	Pld	W	D	L	GF	GA	GD	Pts	Qualification or relegation	HAC	HUF	MAN	HNG
1	Hapoel Acre	3	2	0	1	6	4	+2	6	Qualified to the semi-final			2–1	4–2
2	Hapoel Umm al-Fahm	3	1	2	0	3	2	+1	5	5-8th classification play-offs	1–0		1–1	
3	Maccabi Ahi Nazareth	3	1	1	1	4	3	+1	4	9-12th classification play-offs				
4	Hapoel Nof HaGalil	3	0	1	2	3	7	−4	1	13-16th classification play-offs		1–1	0–2	

Updated to match(es) played on 6 August 2022. Source: Israel Football Association
Rules for classification: 1) points; 2) goal difference; 3) number of wins; 4) goals scored; 5) head to head; 6)deciding match.

=== Group B ===
Pos	Team	Pld	W	D	L	GF	GA	GD	Pts	Qualification or relegation	ITI	HRG	HAF	HKS
1	Ironi Tiberias	3	3	0	0	5	1	+4	9	Qualified to the semi-final		2–0		
2	Hapoel Ramat Gan	3	1	1	1	1	2	−1	4	5-8th classification play-offs				0–0
3	Hapoel Afula	3	1	0	2	2	2	0	3	9-12th classification play-offs	0–1	0–1		
4	Hapoel Kfar Saba	3	0	1	2	1	4	−3	1	13-16th classification play-offs	1–2		0–2	

Updated to match(es) played on 9 August 2018. Source: Israel Football Association
Rules for classification: 1) points; 2) goal difference; 3) number of wins; 4) goals scored; 5) head to head; 6)deciding match.

=== Group C ===
Pos	Team	Pld	W	D	L	GF	GA	GD	Pts	Qualification or relegation	HRL	MPT	HPT	BnY
1	Hapoel Rishon LeZion	3	2	1	0	6	3	+3	7	Qualified to the semi-final			3–1	
2	Maccabi Petah Tikva	3	2	1	0	4	2	+2	7	5-8th classification play-offs				
3	Hapoel Petah Tikva	3	1	0	2	4	5	−1	3	9-12th classification play-offs				2–0
4	Bnei Yehuda Tel Aviv	3	0	0	3	3	7	−4	0	13-16th classification play-offs	2–3			

Updated to match(es) played on 9 August 2018. Source: Israel Football Association
Rules for classification: 1) points; 2) goal difference; 3) number of wins; 4) goals scored; 5) head to head; 6)deciding match.

=== Group D ===
Pos	Team	Pld	W	D	L	GF	GA	GD	Pts	Qualification or relegation	HRS	FKQ	HAD	MJA
1	Hapoel Ramat HaSharon	3	3	0	0	3	0	+3	9	Qualified to the semi-final			1–0	1–0
2	F.C. Kafr Qasim	3	2	0	1	2	1	+1	6	5-8th classification play-offs	0–1			1–0
3	Hapoel Ashdod	3	0	1	2	1	3	−2	1	9-12th classification play-offs		0–1		
4	Maccabi Jaffa	3	0	1	2	1	3	−2	1	13-16th classification play-offs			1–1	

Updated to match(es) played on 9 August 2018. Source: Israel Football Association
Rules for classification: 1) points; 2) goal difference; 3) number of wins; 4) goals scored; 5) head to head; 6)deciding match.

== Classification play-offs ==
=== 13-16th classification play-offs ===
11 August 2022	Hapoel Kfar Saba	2–3	Maccabi Jaffa	Ramla
		[ Report]		Stadium: Ramla Municipal Stadium

Hapoel Nof HaGalil	v	Bnei Yehuda Tel Aviv	Nof HaGalil
	[ Report]		Stadium: Green Stadium

=== 9-12th classification play-offs ===
11 August 2022	Hapoel Ashdod	0–2	Hapoel Afula	Ashdod
		[ Report]		Stadium: Yud-Alef Stadium

Maccabi Ahi Nazareth	v	Hapoel Petah Tikva	Ilut
	[ Report]		Stadium: Ilut Stadium

=== 5-8th classification play-offs ===
11 August 2022	F.C. Kafr Qasim	2–0	Hapoel Ramat Gan	Ness Ziona
		[ Report]		Stadium: Ness Ziona Stadium

Hapoel Umm al-Fahm	v	Maccabi Petah Tikva	Acre
	[ Report]		Stadium: Acre Municipal Stadium

== Semi-final ==
Hapoel Ramat HaSharon	2–1	Ironi Tiberias	Lod
	[ Report]		Stadium: Lod Municipal Stadium

Hapoel Acre	0–2	Hapoel Rishon LeZion	Acre
	[ Report]		Stadium: Acre Municipal Stadium

== Final ==
Hapoel Ramat HaSharon	0-1	Hapoel Rishon LeZion
	[ Report]

== Final rankings ==
R	Team
1	Hapoel Rishon LeZion
2	Hapoel Ramat HaSharon
3-4	Ironi Tiberias
5-6	F.C. Kafr Qasim
7-8	Hapoel Ramat Gan
9-10	Hapoel Afula
11-12	Hapoel Ashdod
13-14	Maccabi Jaffa
15-16	Hapoel Kfar Saba

== See also ==
- 2022–23 Toto Cup Al
- 2022–23 Liga Leumit
