= 1984–85 Toto Cup Leumit =

Final positions
- Champions: Maccabi Yavne
- Runners-up: Beitar Jerusalem

Tournament statistics
- Matches played: 52
- Goals scored: 160 (3.08 per match)

The 1984–85 Toto Cup Leumit was the first season of the third most important football tournament in Israel since its introduction.

It was held in two stages. First, the 16 Liga Leumit teams were divided into four groups. The group winners advanced to the semi-finals, which, as was the final, were held as one-legged matches.

The competition was won by Maccabi Yavne, who had beaten Beitar Jerusalem 2–1 in the final.

== Group stage ==
The matches were played from 30 October 1984 to 6 April 1985.

=== Group A ===
Pos	Team	Pld	W	D	L	GF	GA	GD	Pts	Qualification
1	Maccabi Yavne	6	3	2	1	9	6	+3	11	Advanced to the Quarterfinals
2	Maccabi Haifa	6	3	1	2	11	10	+1	10	
3	Maccabi Petah Tikva	6	2	1	3	9	8	+1	7	
4	Maccabi Tel Aviv	6	2	0	4	6	11	−5	6	

Source: Yeditoh Aharonot, 6 April 1985 (in Hebrew)
Rules for classification: 1st points; 2nd goal difference; 3rd matches won; 4th goals scored; 5th head-to-head; 6th decision match

=== Group B ===
Pos	Team	Pld	W	D	L	GF	GA	GD	Pts	Qualification
1	Beitar Jerusalem	6	5	0	1	16	6	+10	15	Advanced to the Quarterfinals
2	Beitar Tel Aviv	6	3	2	1	13	8	+5	11	
3	Maccabi Jaffa	6	1	1	4	6	11	−5	4	
4	Hapoel Haifa	6	1	1	4	6	16	−10	4	

Source: Yeditoh Aharonot, 6 April 1985 (in Hebrew)
Rules for classification: 1st points; 2nd goal difference; 3rd matches won; 4th goals scored; 5th head-to-head; 6th decision match

=== Group C ===
Pos	Team	Pld	W	D	L	GF	GA	GD	Pts	Qualification
1	Hapoel Be'er Sheva	6	2	3	1	5	4	+1	9	Advanced to the Quarterfinals
2	Hapoel Tel Aviv	6	2	2	2	4	3	+1	8	
3	Hapoel Kfar Saba	6	1	4	1	8	7	+1	7	
4	Hakoah Maccabi Ramat Gan	6	1	3	2	6	9	−3	6	

Source: Yeditoh Aharonot, 6 April 1985 (in Hebrew)
Rules for classification: 1st points; 2nd goal difference; 3rd matches won; 4th goals scored; 5th head-to-head; 6th decision match

=== Group D ===
Pos	Team	Pld	W	D	L	GF	GA	GD	Pts	Qualification
1	Shimshon Tel Aviv	6	4	1	1	12	5	+7	13	Advanced to the Quarterfinals
2	Hapoel Petah Tikva	6	4	0	2	14	17	−3	12	
3	Maccabi Netanya	6	2	0	4	15	11	+4	6	
4	Hapoel Lod	6	1	1	4	6	14	−8	4	

Source: Yeditoh Aharonot, 6 April 1985 (in Hebrew)
Rules for classification: 1st points; 2nd goal difference; 3rd matches won; 4th goals scored; 5th head-to-head; 6th decision match

== Elimination rounds ==
=== Semifinals ===
16 April 1985	Beitar Jerusalem	5–2	Shimshon Tel aviv	Ramat Gan
	Golder 20', 27', 87'; Malmilian 28', 90'		41' Shukrum; 72' Malka	Stadium: Ramat Gan Stadium

16 April 1985	Hapoel Be'er Sheva	1–1 abandoned (93rd minute, rain) (a.e.t.)	Maccabi Yavne	Ramat Gan
	Weizmann 18'		50' (pen.) Ya'akov	Stadium: Ramat Gan Stadium

==== Replay ====
23 April 1985	Hapoel Be'er Sheva	0–2 (a.e.t.)	Maccabi Yavne	Ramat Gan
			68' Vaknin; 75' Peretz	Stadium: Ramat Gan Stadium

=== Final ===
7 May 1985

Beitar Jerusalem	1–2	Maccabi Yavne
Golder 12'		48' Peretz; 56' Ohayon

Ramat Gan Stadium
Attendance: 3000
Referee: Yair Tilinger

== See also ==
- 1984–85 Toto Cup Artzit
