= Joško Bilić =

Croatian footballer

Personal information
- Full name: Josip Bilić
- Date of birth: 5 October 1974 (age 52)
- Place of birth: PR Croatia, FPR Yugoslavia
- Position: Centre-back

Youth career
- Hajduk Split

Senior career*
Years	Team	Apps	(Gls)
1992–1998	Hajduk Split	20	(0)
1993–1994	Šibenik (loan)	16	(0)
1996–1997	Šibenik (loan)	22	(0)
1998–1999	Standard Liège	21	(2)
1999–2000	Maccabi Herzliya	15	(0)
2000	Wuhan Zall	0	(0)
2000–2003	Ashdod	58	(0)
2003	Maccabi Netanya	2	(0)
2003–2004	Casino Salzburg	2	(0)
2004	NK Ljubljana	3	(0)
- * Club domestic league appearances and goals

Josip "Joško" Bilić (born 5 October 1974) is a Croatian retired footballer.
