= Eli Levi =

Israeli former footballer and Centre-back

Personal information
- Birth name: Eliyahu Levi
- Place of birth: Rishon LeZion, Israel
- Position: Centre-back

Team information
- Current team: Bnei Yehuda (Manager)

Senior career*
Years	Team	Apps	(Gls)
1993–1994	Maccabi Jaffa		
1994–1995	Bnei Yehuda		
1995–1996	Hapoel Kfar Shalem		
1996–1997	Hakoah Amidar Ramat Gan		
1997–1998	Hapoel Be'er Sheva		
1998–1999	Maccabi Akhi Nazareth		
2000–2004	Hapoel Ramat HaSharon		
2004–2005	Hapoel Acre	23	(0)
2005–2006	Hapoel Ashkelon		
2006–2012	Hapoel Ramat Gan		

Managerial career
- 2014–2018: Hapoel Ashkelon (Assistant Manager)
- 2019: S.C Ashdod (Assistant Manager)
- 2019–2023: S.C. Ashdod (U-19)
- 2023–2025: S.C Ashdod
- 2025: Hapoel Kfar Shalem
- 2025–: Bnei Yehuda
- * Club domestic league appearances and goals

Eliyahu "Eli" Levi (Hebrew: אליהו "אלי" לוי) is an Israeli former football player who currently serves as coach of Liga Leumit side Bnei Yehuda.
