= Ihud Bnei Shefa-'Amr F.C. =

Ihud Bnei Shef-'Amr
- Full name: Ihud Bnei Shefa-'Amr Football Club
- Founded: 2019
- Ground: Municipal Stadium, Shefa-'Amr
- Capacity: 2,500
- Chairman: Rami Abu Harb
- Manager: Shlomi Dora
- League: Liga Alef North
- 2023–24: Liga Leumit, 16th of 16 (relegated)

Ihud Bnei Shefa-'Amr (Arabic: اتحاد بني شفاعمرو, Hebrew: איחוד בני שפרעם) is an Israeli football club based in Shefa-'Amr. The club played its home matches at the Municipal Stadium.

== History ==
It was founded in 2019 after Hapoel Shefa-'Amr dissolved, but the club was founded to replace Maccabi Shefa-'Amr. In its first season the club was promoted to Liga Bet. Two seasons later it was promoted to Liga Alef.

On 14 April 2023 the club won promotion to Liga Leumit after a 1–1 draw against Hapoel Kaukab.

== Current squad ==
As of 1 November 2024.

No.	Pos.	Nation	Player
1	GK	(Israel) ISR	Mohammed Dalal
2	DF	(Israel) ISR	Maaruf Said
3	DF	(Israel) ISR	Tareq Diab
5	MF	(Israel) ISR	Ahmed Zabeh
6	MF	(Israel) ISR	Rany Hamza
7	FW	(Israel) ISR	Mohammed Sabah
8	MF	(Israel) ISR	Saaman Sliman
9	FW	(Israel) ISR	Hassan Subeh
10	FW	(Israel) ISR	Ishay Buzorgi
11	MF	(Israel) ISR	Essam Atariyye
12	MF	(Israel) ISR	Moamen Diab

No.	Pos.	Nation	Player
15	MF	(Israel) ISR	Fadi Awad
16	MF	(Israel) ISR	Abed Shadfana
17	MF	(Israel) ISR	Eyas Ka'abiye
26	DF	(Israel) ISR	Abed Murjan
27	DF	(Israel) ISR	Mohammed Yosefin
29	DF	(Israel) ISR	Kamal Abu Alhija
32	GK	(Israel) ISR	Yazan Awad
77	MF	(Israel) ISR	Wadeea Safouri
—	MF	(Israel) ISR	Anwar Murad
—	MF	(Israel) ISR	Mohammed Abu Hassan
