= 2022–23 Liga Leumit =

Liga Leumit
- Season: 2022–23
- Dates: 18 August 2022 – 12 May 2023
- Champions: Maccabi Petah Tikva
- Promoted: Maccabi Petah Tikva; Hapoel Petah Tikva
- Relegated: A.S. Ashdod; Maccabi Ahi Nazareth
- Matches: 240
- Goals: 596 (2.48 per match)

The 2022–23 Liga Leumit is the 24th season as second tier since its realignment in 1999 and the 81st season of second-tier football in Israel.

A total of sixteen teams are contesting in the league, including twelve sides from the 2020-21 season, the two promoted teams from 2021–22 Liga Alef and the two relegated teams from 2021–22 Israeli Premier League.

== Changes from 2021–22 season ==
The following teams have changed division since the 2021–22 season.

=== To Liga Leumit ===
==== Promoted from Liga Alef ====
- Maccabi Jaffa (South Division)
- Ironi Tiberias (North Division)

==== Relegated from Premier League ====
- Hapoel Nof HaGalil
- Maccabi Petah Tikva

=== From Liga Leumit ===
==== Promoted to Premier League ====
- Maccabi Bnei Reineh
- Sektzia Nes Tziona

==== Relegated to Liga Alef ====
- Hapoel Ra'anana
- Beitar Tel Aviv Bat Yam

== Overview ==
=== Stadions and locations ===
Club	Home City	Stadium	Capacity
A.S. Ashdod	Ashdod	Yud-Alef Stadium	7,800
Bnei Yehuda Tel Aviv	Tel Aviv	Bloomfield Stadium	29,400
F.C. Kafr Qasim	Kafr Qasim	Lod Municipal Stadium (Note: F.C. Kafr Qasim play their home games at a neutral venue because their own ground does not meet league requirements.)	3,000
Hapoel Acre	Acre	Acre Municipal Stadium	5,000
Hapoel Afula	Afula	Afula Illit Stadium	3,000
Hapoel Kfar Saba	Kfar Saba	Levita Stadium	5,800
Hapoel Nof HaGalil	Nof HaGalil	Green Stadium	5,200
Hapoel Petah Tikva	Petah Tikva	HaMoshava Stadium	11,500
Hapoel Ramat Gan	Ramat Gan	Ramat Gan Stadium	13,370
Hapoel Ramat HaSharon	Ramat HaSharon	Grundman Stadium	4,300
Hapoel Rishon LeZion	Rishon LeZion	Haberfeld Stadium	6,000
Hapoel Umm al-Fahm	Umm al-Fahm	HaShalom Stadium	7,000
Ironi Tiberias	Tiberias	Afula Illit Stadium (Note: Ironi Tiberias play their home games at a neutral venue because their own ground does not meet league requirements.)	3,000
Maccabi Ahi Nazareth	Nazareth	Ilut Stadium	4,932
Maccabi Jaffa	Tel Aviv	Ramla Municipal Stadium	2,000
Maccabi Petah Tikva	Petah Tikva	HaMoshava Stadium	11,500

== Standings ==
Pos	Team	Pld	W	D	L	GF	GA	GD	Pts	Qualification or relegation
1	Maccabi Petah Tikva	30	19	4	7	57	30	+27	61	Qualification for the Promotion playoffs
2	Hapoel Petah Tikva	30	18	6	6	48	25	+23	60	Qualification for the Promotion playoffs
3	Ironi Tiberias	30	15	10	5	50	29	+21	55	Qualification for the Promotion playoffs
4	Hapoel Umm al-Fahm	30	14	9	7	37	21	+16	51	Qualification for the Promotion playoffs
5	Hapoel Acre	30	13	8	9	38	31	+7	47	Qualification for the Promotion playoffs
6	Maccabi Jaffa	30	13	5	12	42	42	0	44	Qualification for the Promotion playoffs
7	Hapoel Kfar Saba	30	12	6	12	38	39	−1	42	Qualification for the Promotion playoffs
8	Bnei Yehuda	30	11	8	11	43	39	+4	41	Qualification for the Promotion playoffs
9	Hapoel Afula	30	10	9	11	37	36	+1	39	Qualification for the Relegation playoffs
10	Maccabi Ahi Nazareth	30	10	6	14	30	42	−12	36	Qualification for the Relegation playoffs
11	Hapoel Rishon LeZion	30	9	8	13	33	38	−5	35	Qualification for the Relegation playoffs
12	Hapoel Ramat HaSharon	30	9	8	13	29	35	−6	35	Qualification for the Relegation playoffs
13	Hapoel Ramat Gan	30	8	10	12	30	40	−10	34	Qualification for the Relegation playoffs
14	F.C. Kafr Qasim	30	7	12	11	33	35	−2	33	Qualification for the Relegation playoffs
15	Hapoel Nof HaGalil	30	7	6	17	31	53	−22	27	Qualification for the Relegation playoffs
16	A.S. Ashdod (Note: A.S. Ashdod were deducted 12 points)	30	4	7	19	20	61	−41	7	Qualification for the Relegation playoffs

Updated to match(es) played on unknown. Source: Soccerway
Rules for classification: 1) points; 2) goal difference; 3) number of wins; 4) goals scored; 5) head to head; 6) deciding match.

== Results ==
Home \ Away	BNY	FKQ	HAC	HAF	HAD	HKS	HNG	HPT	HRG	HRS	HRL	HUF	ITI	MAN	MJA	MPT
Bnei Yehuda	—							1–0			2–2	1–1			0–1	
F.C. Kafr Qasim	0–0	—		3–3											0–0	
Hapoel Acre		1–1	—			1–0							0–1		4–2	
Hapoel Afula	3–0			—								2–0			0–0	2–1
A.S. Ashdod		1–3		2–1	—	2–0				0–0						
Hapoel Kfar Saba		3–2		1–0		—			0–1							
Hapoel Nof HaGalil			1–2				—	1–4			2–1			3–2		0–3
Hapoel Petah Tikva		1–0			4–0	0–1		—					2–2			
Hapoel Ramat Gan	0–2						2–2		—						1–4	0–2
Hapoel Ramat HaSharon	1–0		1–2				2–0			—						0–1
Hapoel Rishon LeZion					2–0	0–1					—		2–0	2–0		
Hapoel Umm al-Fahm		2–0	1–1		2–0	2–2						—				
Ironi Tiberias				5–1			0–0		2–0	1–1			—			
Maccabi Ahi Nazareth			2–0		0–0				0–1	0–2			2–1	—		
Maccabi Jaffa						2–1		1–2				2–1			—	
Maccabi Petah Tikva								4–0			2–2	1–0		1–0		—

Updated to match(es) played on complete source="Ligat Leumit – Matches".. Source:
Legend: Blue = home team win; Yellow = draw; Red = away team win.

== Position by round ==
Team ╲ Round	1	2	3	4	5	6	7	8	9	10	11	12	13	14	15	16	17	18	19	20	21	22	23	24	25	26	27	28	29	30
Maccabi Petah Tikva	2	1	1	1	1	1	1	1																						
Maccabi Jaffa	1	6	5	3	6	7	6	2																						
Hapoel Acre	10	12	9	8	11	8	7	3																						
Hapoel Petah Tikva	6	2	2	5	3	4	8	4																						
Hapoel Kfar Saba	4	7	3	2	2	2	2	5																						
Ironi Tiberias	7	5	11	9	12	9	10	6																						
Hapoel Rishon LeZion	11	11	7	6	5	6	4	7																						
Hapoel Ramat HaSharon	5	4	12	10	7	3	5	8																						
Hapoel Afula	3	3	4	7	4	5	3	9																						
Hapoel Umm al-Fahm	13	14	8	11	10	13	9	10																						
Bnei Yehuda	9	10	6	4	9	10	11	11																						
Hapoel Nof HaGalil	15	15	15	13	13	12	12	12																						
F.C. Kafr Qasim	12	9	14	15	14	14	14	13																						
Maccabi Ahi Nazareth	8	13	10	12	8	11	13	14																						
Hapoel Ramat Gan	14	8	13	14	15	15	15	15																						
A.S. Ashdod	16	16	16	16	16	16	16	16																						

== Promotion playoffs ==
Pos	Team	Pld	W	D	L	GF	GA	GD	Pts	Qualification or relegation	MPT	HPT	ITI	HUF	HAC	MJA	HKS	BNY
1	Maccabi Petah Tikva (C, P)	37	23	6	8	73	34	+39	75	Promoted to Israeli Premier League	—							
2	Hapoel Petah Tikva (P)	37	21	8	8	62	31	+31	71	Promoted to Israeli Premier League		—						
3	Ironi Tiberias	37	19	10	8	57	38	+19	67				—					
4	Hapoel Umm al-Fahm	37	17	9	11	44	32	+12	60					—				
5	Hapoel Acre	37	15	11	11	50	39	+11	56						—			
6	Maccabi Jaffa	37	15	7	15	47	50	−3	52							—		
7	Hapoel Kfar Saba	37	15	6	16	48	52	−4	51								—	
8	Bnei Yehuda	37	13	9	15	51	59	−8	48									—

Source: Soccerway
Legend: Blue = home team win; Yellow = draw; Red = away team win.
Rules for classification: 1) points; 2) goal difference; 3) number of wins; 4) goals scored; 5) head to head; 6) deciding match.
(C) Champions; (P) Promoted

== Relegation playoffs ==
Pos	Team	Pld	W	D	L	GF	GA	GD	Pts	Qualification or relegation	HRG	HAF	HRS	HRL	FKQ	HNG	MAN	HAD
9	Hapoel Ramat Gan	37	13	11	13	50	49	+1	50		—							
10	Hapoel Afula	37	12	10	15	49	51	−2	46			—						
11	Hapoel Ramat HaSharon	37	12	10	15	45	47	−2	46				—					
12	Hapoel Rishon LeZion	37	11	11	15	45	48	−3	44					—				
13	F.C. Kafr Qasim	37	9	15	13	43	47	−4	42						—			
14	Hapoel Nof HaGalil	37	12	6	19	42	59	−17	42	Qualification for the Promotion/relegation playoff						—		
15	Maccabi Ahi Nazareth (R)	37	11	9	17	37	55	−18	42	Relegated to Liga Alef							—	
16	A.S. Ashdod (Note: A.S. Ashdod were deducted 12 points) (R)	37	4	10	23	26	78	−52	10	Relegated to Liga Alef								—

Source: Soccerway
Legend: Blue = home team win; Yellow = draw; Red = away team win.
Rules for classification: 1) points; 2) goal difference; 3) number of wins; 4) goals scored; 5) head to head; 6) deciding match.
(R) Relegated

== Promotion/relegation playoff ==
The 14th-placed team faced Liga Alef promotion play-offs winner in a one game.

17 May 2023
19:40

Hapoel Nof HaGalil	2–0	Hapoel Kfar Shalem
Alan Buzorgi 3' mahran Radi 75'	Report

Netanya Stadium, Netanya
Referee: Orel Grinfeeld
