= Julio César (footballer, born 1990) =

Brazilian footballer

Personal information
- Full name: Julio César da Silva Rodríguez
- Date of birth: 23 January 1990 (age 36)
- Place of birth: Paranaiba, Brazil
- Position: Forward

Team information
- Current team: Hapoel Kfar Saba
- Number: 9

Senior career*
Years	Team	Apps	(Gls)
2010	XV de Piracicaba	0	(0)
2010–20114	Palmeiras II	8	(2)
2011	→ Oeste (loan)	1	(0)
2011	→ Camboriú (loan)	0	(0)
2012	→ São Bento (loan)	6	(1)
2013	→ Grêmio (DP) (loan)	0	(0)
2014	Marília		
2014–2016	Independente	12	(2)
2016	São Caetano	8	(0)
2017	Desportivo Brasil	19	(7)
2017–2019	Hapoel Nazareth Illit	64	(16)
2019–2020	Hapoel Ashkelon	32	(8)
2020–2021	Hapoel Iksal	30	(12)
2021–2022	Maccabi Bnei Reineh	35	(13)
2022–2024	Ironi Tiberias	57	(22)
2024–	Hapoel Kfar Saba	68	(28)
- * Club domestic league appearances and goals as of 24 June 2026

Julio César da Silva Rodríguez (born 23 January 1990), the Julio César, is a Brazilian footballer who plays as a forward for Hapoel Kfar Saba.

== Career ==
Played in the Palmeiras.

=== Career statistics ===
(Correct as of October 16, 2010)

Club	Season	State League		Brazilian Série A		Copa do Brasil		Copa Libertadores		Copa Sudamericana		Total	
Club	Season	Apps	Goals	Apps	Goals	Apps	Goals	Apps	Goals	Apps	Goals	Apps	Goals
Palmeiras B	2010	-	-	0	0	-	-	-	-	-	-	0	0
Total		-	-	0	0	-	-	-	-	-	-	0	0

== Contract ==
- Palmeiras.
