= Hapoel Ra'anana A.F.C. =

Israeli football club

Hapoel Ra'anana
- Full name: Hapoel Ra'anana Association Football Club
- Nickname: Hakbutza Mehisron (The group from Sharon)
- Founded: 1938; 88 years ago as Hapoel Ra'anana F.C. 1972; 54 years ago as Hapoel Ra'anana A.F.C.
- Ground: Karnei Oren Memorial Field, Ra'anana, Israel
- Capacity: 2,500
- Owner: Asher Alon
- Chairman: Ilan Katz
- Manager: Adam Lam
- League: Liga Leumit
- 2025–26: Liga Leumit, 10th of 16
Home colours	Away colours	Third colours

Hapoel Ra'anana Association Football Club (Hebrew: עמותת הפועל רעננה מחלקת כדורגל, Amutat Hapoel Ra'anana Mahleket Kaduregel) is an Israeli football club based in the city of Ra'anana. They currently play in Liga Leumit, the second division of the Israeli Football League.

== History ==
A chart showing the progress of Hapoel Ra'anana through the Israeli football league system, from 1939 to the present

A Hapoel Ra'anana was established in 1938. They were placed in the South Division of Liga Bet (then the second division) in 1951–52.

The modern club was established in 1972, and in the mid-1990s was playing in Liga Gimel, the lowest tier of Israeli football. In 1995 they started a remarkable period of success after they won their division of Liga Gimel and were promoted to Liga Bet. In 1997–98, they won Liga Bet South A division and were promoted to Liga Alef. In 1998–99 they won the North Division of Liga Alef to earn promotion to Liga Artzit. After finishing third in 1999–2000, they won the league the following season and were promoted to Liga Leumit.

In 2008–09, the club was promoted to the Israeli Premier League for the first time in their history. However, they had to play its home matches at Hapoel Kfar Saba's Levita Stadium, as its home ground, the Karnei Oren Memorial Field, did not meet Premier League requirements. In January 2010, the city council published plans for a 7,500-capacity new stadium in Lev HaPark neighborhood.

After a single season in the top division, in which the club finished at the second bottom place, Ra'anana were relegated to Liga Leumit.

After three seasons in Liga Leumit, in 2012–13, Ra'anana finished runners-up and were promoted again to the Israeli Premier League. In the 2015–16 season, the club achieved its best placing to date, when they finished sixth in the Israeli Premier League.

In the 2019–20 season, Hapoel Ra'anana were relegated after suffering a 1–0 defeat to Ironi Kiryat Shmona, after 7 seasons in the top flight.

== Players ==
=== Current squad ===
As of 29 March, 2026

No.	Pos.	Nation	Player
1	GK	ISR	Yahli Nimni
3	DF	ISR	Guy Reich
4	DF	ISR	Jawad Kadah
5	DF	ISR	Aviv Lin
6	MF	ISR	Paz Belander
7	MF	ISR	Yuvel Titelman
8	MF	ISR	Snir Shoker (captain)
9	FW	NGA	Peter Michael
10	FW	ISR	Netanel Hagani
11	FW	NGA	Wonderson Yakubu
12	DF	ISR	Itamar Guetta
15	MF	ISR	Roei Hare

No.	Pos.	Nation	Player
16	DF	ISR	Harel Lichtenstein
17	MF	ISR	Tom Rostovsky
18	MF	ISR	Or Azulay
21	DF	ISR	Majed Agbaria
24	DF	ISR	Alon Demol
25	DF	CIV	Hamed Sawadogo
26	GK	ISR	Tamir Stoller
28	MF	ISR	Itay Musli
29	DF	ISR	Itay Yishay
31	MF	ISR	Daniel Atlan
66	DF	ISR	Gilad Aviv
77	MF	ISR	Amir Berkovits
79	MF	ISR	Ron Werner

== Club officials ==
=== Boardroom ===
- Owner: Municipality of Ra'anana
- President: Asher Alon, Damian Rotman
- Chairman: Ilan Katz

=== Management ===
- Manager (interim): Gal Cohen
- Assistant Manager: Dani Bondar

=== Academy Coaching Staff ===
- Youth Academy Director: Ami Vazana
- Under 23 Coach: Ronny Keidar

== Managers ==
- (Israel) Eli Cohen (2006 – Feb 28, 2010)
- (Israel) Tzvika Tzemah (April 1, 2010 – July 19, 2010)
- (Israel) Eyal Lachman (May 1, 2010 – Oct 18, 2011)
- (Israel) Meni Koretski (July 1, 2013– May 10, 2014)
- (Israel) Haim Silvas (May 10, 2014– May 2017)
- (Israel) Dudu Avraham (May 2017- September 2017)
- (Israel) Guy Levy (September 2017- October 2017)
- (Israel) Meni Koretski (October 2017-December 2019)
- (Israel) Nisso Avitan (December 2019-February 2020)
- (Israel) Eyal Lachman (February 2020-July 2020)
- (Israel) Gal Cohen (July 2020-)
