= Toto Cup =

Israel Toto Cup
- First season: 1984; 42 years ago
- Country: Israel
- Confederation: UEFA (Europe)
- Number of clubs: 30 (14 participants in Al, 16 in Leumit)
- Current champions: Hapoel Tel Aviv F.C. (Al); Bnei Yehuda Tel Aviv (Leumit)
- Most championships: Maccabi Tel Aviv (9 cups)
- Website: Toto Cup Al; Toto Cup Leumit
- Current: 2026–27 Toto Cup Al; 2026–27 Toto Cup Leumit

The Israel Toto Cup (Hebrew: גביע הטוטו, Gvia Ha'Toto) is an association football tournament that features clubs in the two highest divisions in Israel: the Israeli Premier League a.k.a. Ligat Ha'Al; and the Israeli 2nd division Liga Leumit. Both of these leagues are featured separately for the Israel Toto Cup – at a distinct seasonal tournament for each of these two. They are simply referred to as Toto Cup Al and Toto Cup Leumit, in many global media outlets.

From 1999 to 2009, the tournament was also open to clubs from the third division, until the cancellation of Liga Artzit.

The Toto Cup is the third most important competition in Israeli football after the Israeli Premier League and the Israeli State Cup. As it isn't highly regarded, Israeli clubs use the games to rotate their squad and give fringe players and youth players a chance. However, the Israeli Sports Betting Council pays 1.25 million NIS to the winners, while the runners-up receive 950,000 NIS.

== History ==
League cups, in different formats, were played in Israel irregularly since the 1950s. In 1958, 1968 and 1973, anniversary cups, celebrating the 10th, 20th and 25th anniversary of independence of Israel, were played as a league cup competition, by Liga Leumit and Liga Alef clubs separately. In 1975–76 a League Cup competition was played, won by Hapoel Hadera (in Liga Leumit) and Maccabi Ramat Amidar (in Liga Alef), but the competition wasn't played again in the following seasons.

In 198,2, the IFA introduced a league cup, called Lilian Cup, after former IFA treasurer Yehuda Lilian, who died in February 1982. The competition, played at the beginning of the season, involved the top four teams from the previous season. Its format was changed during its years of play, at times being played in league format and at times being played as a knock-out competition. The competition was last played in 1989–90. This cup is sometimes referred to as a predecessor of the Toto Cup, but these competitions are unconnected.

In 1984–85, the IFA introduced a League Cup competition for the two top tiers of the Israeli football league system. The first round of the competition was played on 30 October 1984, while the first finals, played on 7 May 1985, was won by Maccabi Yavne (Liga Leumit) and Hapoel Ashkelon (Liga Artzit). Before the 1986–87 Season, the Israeli Sports Betting Council started sponsoring the competition, which was renamed Toto Cup, and guaranteed rewards for participation and achievements in the competition.

In 1999–2000, following the creation of the Israeli Premier League, the competition for the two top tiers was merged, so that the competition was played by the 24 top teams, and a separate competition was introduced for the third tier, Liga Artzit. In 2004–05 the competitions were separated once again, so starting from this season and up until the closure of Liga Artzit at the end of the 2008–09 season there were three league cup competitions running, for each of the three top divisions.

In the 2013–14 season, the Toto Cup was not played due to a disagreement between the Israeli Sports Betting Council and the IFA following the publication of a report by a committee headed by Yaron Zelekha, which was set up to examine the way football in Israel was managed. The IFA and the Israeli Sports Betting Council reached an agreement in October 2013, which confirmed the cancellation of the 2013–14 competitions.

== Current competition structure ==
=== Group stages ===
==== Premier League ====
The group stages are usually played before the opening of the football leagues and take place from August to October, and the finals take place in January. The 14 teams in the league are divided into three groups: five teams in two groups, and four teams in one group. Each team plays against each team once. The two teams placed last in each group are eliminated, with the rest of the teams advancing to the quarterfinals.

==== Liga Leumit ====
The group stages are usually played before the opening of the football leagues and take place from August to September, and the finals take place in December. The 16 teams in the league are divided into four groups, with four teams in each group. Each team plays against each team once, making a total of three games for each team. The best two teams in each group advance to the quarterfinals.

=== Further rounds ===
Until 2009, the eight teams that played in the quarterfinals played in a regular knock-out, two meetings for each team in the quarterfinals. Each team played one meeting at their home in the order determined in a raffle.

From the 2009–10 season until the 2012–13 season, both the Al and Leumit cups had just one game played in the quarterfinals on the home ground of one of the teams by a raffle, just like the State Cup games.

Since the 2012–13 season, Al teams play each other twice in the quarterfinals while Leumit play each other once.

The four winning teams that progressed to the semifinals play against their opponent. Once the two winners reach the final and the final winner is the cup winner. The final and the Toto Cup semifinals are all played in the same stadium.

From the quarterfinals and above, if a match is drawn, the game is settled with extra time and penalty shootouts.

== Winners ==
| Season | Top Division | Second Division | Third Division |
|---|---|---|---|
| 1984–85 (Leumit | Artzit) | Maccabi Yavne | Hapoel Ashkelon | Not held |
| 1985–86 (Leumit | Artzit) | Hapoel Petah Tikva | Hapoel Hadera | Not held |
| 1986–87 (Leumit | Artzit) | Shimshon Tel Aviv | Hapoel Haifa | Not held |
| 1987–88 (Leumit | Artzit) | Shimshon Tel Aviv | Hapoel Bat Yam | Not held |
| 1988–89 (Leumit | Artzit) | Hapoel Be'er Sheva | Hapoel Hadera | Not held |
| 1989–90 (Leumit | Artzit) | Hapoel Petah Tikva | Maccabi Petah Tikva | Not held |
| 1990–91 (Leumit | Artzit) | Hapoel Petah Tikva | Maccabi Petah Tikva | Not held |
| 1991–92 (Leumit | Artzit) | Bnei Yehuda | Maccabi Jaffa | Not held |
| 1992–93 (Leumit | Artzit) | Maccabi Tel Aviv | Maccabi Jaffa | Not held |
| 1993–94 (Leumit | Artzit) | Maccabi Haifa | Beitar Tel Aviv | Not held |
| 1994–95 (Leumit | Artzit) | Maccabi Petah Tikva | Hapoel Bat Yam | Not held |
| 1995–96 (Leumit | Artzit) | Hapoel Be'er Sheva | Hakoah Maccabi Ramat Gan | Not held |
| 1996–97 (Leumit | Artzit) | Bnei Yehuda | Hakoah Maccabi Ramat Gan | Not held |
| 1997–98 (Leumit | Artzit) | Beitar Jerusalem | Maccabi Jaffa | Not held |
| 1998–99 (Leumit | Artzit) | Maccabi Tel Aviv | Hakoah Maccabi Ramat Gan | Not held |
| 1999–2000 (Al-Leumit | Artzit) | Maccabi Petah Tikva | | Hapoel Ramat Gan |
| 2000–01 (Al-Leumit | Artzit) | Hapoel Haifa | | Maccabi Kafr Kanna |
| 2001–02 (Al-Leumit | Artzit) | Hapoel Tel Aviv | | Hapoel Ashkelon |
| 2002–03 (Al-Leumit | Artzit) | Maccabi Haifa | | Hapoel Ashkelon |
| 2003–04 (Al-Leumit | Artzit) | Maccabi Petah Tikva | | Ironi Ramat HaSharon |
| 2004–05 (Al | Leumit | Artzit) | Hapoel Petah Tikva | Maccabi Netanya | Hapoel Ashkelon |
| 2005–06 (Al | Leumit | Artzit) | Maccabi Haifa | Hapoel Acre | Hapoel Ramat Gan |
| 2006–07 (Al | Leumit | Artzit) | Maccabi Herzliya | Ironi Kiryat Shmona | Hapoel Ramat Gan |
| 2007–08 (Al | Leumit | Artzit) | Maccabi Haifa | Hapoel Petah Tikva | Ironi Kiryat Ata |
| 2008–09 (Al | Leumit | Artzit) | Maccabi Tel Aviv | Hapoel Be'er Sheva | Hapoel Marmorek |
| 2009–10 (Al | Leumit) | Beitar Jerusalem | Ironi Kiryat Shmona | Not held |
| 2010–11 (Al | Leumit) | Ironi Kiryat Shmona | Ironi Ramat HaSharon | Not held |
| 2011–12 (Al | Leumit) | Ironi Kiryat Shmona | Hapoel Ramat Gan | Not held |
| 2012–13 (Al | Leumit) | Hapoel Haifa | Hapoel Rishon LeZion | Not held |
| 2013–14 | Not held | | Not held |
| 2014–15 (Al | Leumit) | Maccabi Tel Aviv | Hapoel Bnei Lod | Not held |
| 2015–16 (Al | Leumit) | Maccabi Petah Tikva | Hapoel Ashkelon | Not held |
| 2016–17 (Al | Leumit) | Hapoel Be'er Sheva | Maccabi Sha'arayim | Not held |
| 2017–18 (Al | Leumit) | Maccabi Tel Aviv | Hapoel Afula | Not held |
| 2018–19 (Al | Leumit) | Maccabi Tel Aviv | Hapoel Katamon Jerusalem | Not held |
| 2019–20 (Al | Leumit) | Beitar Jerusalem | Hapoel Ramat Gan | Not held |
| 2020–21 (Al | Leumit) | Maccabi Tel Aviv | Hapoel Nof HaGalil | Not held |
| 2021–22 (Al | Leumit) | Maccabi Haifa | Beitar Tel Aviv Bat Yam | Not held |
| 2022–23 (Al | Leumit) | Maccabi Netanya | Hapoel Rishon LeZion | Not held |
| 2023–24 (Al | Leumit) | Maccabi Tel Aviv | Ironi Tiberias | Not held |
| 2024–25 (Al | Leumit) | Maccabi Tel Aviv | Hapoel Tel Aviv | Not held |
| 2025–26 (Al | Leumit) | Beitar Jerusalem | Bnei Yehuda | Not held |
| 2026–27 (Al | Leumit) | Hapoel Tel Aviv | Bnei Yehuda | Not held |

== Winnings table ==
Top Division
| Rank | Team | Winnings |
|---|---|---|
| 1 | Maccabi Tel Aviv | 9 |
| 2 | Maccabi Haifa | 5 |
| 3 | Beitar Jerusalem | 4 |
| 3 | Maccabi Petah Tikva | 4 |
| 3 | Hapoel Petah Tikva | 4 |
| 6 | Hapoel Be'er Sheva | 3 |
| 7 | Shimshon Tel Aviv | 2 |
| 7 | Bnei Yehuda | 2 |
| 7 | Ironi Kiryat Shmona | 2 |
| 7 | Hapoel Haifa | 2 |
| 11 | Hapoel Tel Aviv | 1 |
| 11 | Maccabi Herzliya | 1 |
| 11 | Maccabi Yavne | 1 |
| 11 | Maccabi Netanya | 1 |

Second Division
| Rank | Team | Winnings |
|---|---|---|
| 1 | Hakoah Maccabi Ramat Gan | 3 |
| 1 | Maccabi Jaffa | 3 |
| 3 | Hapoel Ramat Gan | 2 |
| 3 | Hapoel Hadera | 2 |
| 3 | Hapoel Ashkelon | 2 |
| 3 | Hapoel Bat Yam | 2 |
| 3 | Maccabi Petah Tikva | 2 |
| 3 | Ironi Kiryat Shmona | 2 |
| 3 | Hapoel Rishon LeZion | 2 |
| 10 | Beitar Tel Aviv | 1 |
| 10 | Hapoel Be'er Sheva | 1 |
| 10 | Hapoel Haifa | 1 |
| 10 | Hapoel Acre | 1 |
| 10 | Hapoel Petah Tikva | 1 |
| 10 | Maccabi Netanya | 1 |
| 10 | Ironi Ramat HaSharon | 1 |
| 10 | Hapoel Bnei Lod | 1 |
| 10 | Maccabi Sha'arayim | 1 |
| 10 | Hapoel Afula | 1 |
| 10 | Hapoel Katamon Jerusalem | 1 |
| 10 | Hapoel Nof HaGalil | 1 |
| 10 | Beitar Tel Aviv Bat Yam | 1 |
| 10 | Ironi Tiberias | 1 |
| 10 | Hapoel Tel Aviv | 1 |

Third Division
| Rank | Team | Winnings |
|---|---|---|
| 1 | Hapoel Ashkelon | 3 |
| 1 | Hapoel Ramat Gan | 3 |
| 3 | Hapoel Marmorek | 1 |
| 3 | Maccabi Kafr Kanna | 1 |
| 3 | Ironi Ramat HaSharon | 1 |
| 3 | Ironi Kiryat Ata | 1 |
