= 2024–25 Beitar Jerusalem F.C. season =

Beitar Jerusalem
2024–25 season
- Chairman: (Israel) Barak Abramov
- Manager: (Israel) Barak Yitzhaki
- Stadium: Teddy Stadium
- Israeli Premier League: 4th
Home colours	Away colours	Third colours

Beitar Jerusalem are an Israeli football club which are based in Jerusalem. This season will be the club's 89th competitive season in the club's history. During this season the club will take part in the following competitions: Israeli Premier League, Toto Cup Al, State Cup.

== Current squad ==
As of 2 January 2025

No.	Pos.	Nation	Player
1	GK	ISR	Raz Karmi
2	DF	ISR	Zohar Zasno
4	DF	MAD	Jean Marcelin
5	DF	ISR	Gil Cohen
6	MF	CIV	Ismaila Soro
7	FW	ISR	Yarden Shua (captain)
8	MF	ISR	Yarin Levi
10	MF	ISR	Adi Yona
11	FW	ISR	Timothy Muzie
12	FW	ISR	Nehoray Dabush
14	MF	NCL	Jekob Jeno
15	MF	ISR	Dor Micha

No.	Pos.	Nation	Player
17	FW	ISR	Yan Yusupov
18	DF	RUS	Grigori Morozov
19	DF	ISR	Li On Mizrahi
20	DF	ISR	Uri Dahan
22	GK	ISR	Amit Korenfein
23	FW	CRC	Mayron George
26	MF	ISR	Ayi Silva Kangani
27	FW	GHA	Patrick Twumasi (on loan from Pafos)
44	DF	ISR	Liel Deri
55	GK	POR	Miguel Silva
77	FW	ISR	Omer Atzili

== Other players under contract ==
No.	Pos.	Nation	Player
—	MF	ISR	Ron Nulman

== Out on loan ==
Note: Flags indicate national team as defined under FIFA eligibility rules; some limited exceptions apply. Players may hold more than one non-FIFA nationality.

No.	Pos.	Nation	Player
—	GK	ISR	Nadav Markovitch (at Hapoel Kfar Saba until 30 June 2025)
—	GK	ISR	Kim Zivat (at Hapoel Marmorek until 30 June 2025)
—	GK	ISR	Roy Sason (at Bnei Yehuda until 30 June 2025)

No.	Pos.	Nation	Player
—	DF	ISR	Raz Baruchian (at FC Jerusalem until 30 June 2025)
—	MF	ISR	Miron Tal (at Beitar Nordia until 30 June 2025)
—	FW	ISR	Ofir Godosi (at AS Ashdod until 30 June 2025)

== Club Friendlies ==
11 July 2024 Friendly	Bnei Yehuda (Israel)	0-1	(Israel) Beitar Jerusalem	Tel Aviv
9:30 EEST		Report	Levi 67'	Stadium: Bloomfield Stadium

17 July 2024 Friendly	Lokomotiv GO (Bulgaria)	1-2	(Israel) Beitar Jerusalem	Pravets
11:30 EEST		Report		Stadium: Gradski Stadion

23 July 2024 Friendly	Septemvri Sofia (Bulgaria)	2-4	(Israel) Beitar Jerusalem	Pravets
18:30 EEST	43'; 73'	Report	Shua 36'; Timothy Muzie 45+2' 47'; Nadav Markovitch 77'	Stadium: Gradski Stadion

== Israeli Premier League ==
=== League table ===
Pos	Team	Pld	W	D	L	GF	GA	GD	Pts	Qualification
2	Maccabi Tel Aviv	26	17	6	3	56	27	+29	57	Qualification for the Championship round
3	Maccabi Haifa	26	14	6	6	54	32	+22	47 (Note: Maccabi Haifa had 1 point deducted following riot in Maccabi Tel Aviv match.)	Qualification for the Championship round
4	Beitar Jerusalem	26	13	7	6	48	34	+14	46	Qualification for the Championship round
5	Hapoel Haifa	26	12	5	9	39	31	+8	41	Qualification for the Championship round
6	Maccabi Netanya	26	11	4	11	39	37	+2	37	Qualification for the Championship round

Source: Soccerway, One
Rules for classification: 1) Points; 2) Goal difference; 3) Matches won; 4) Goals scored; 5) Head-to-head points; 6) Head-to-head goal difference; 7) Head-to-head goals scored; 8) Play-off.

=== Results summary ===
Overall								Home						Away					
Pld	W	D	L	GF	GA	GD	Pts	W	D	L	GF	GA	GD	W	D	L	GF	GA	GD
0	0	0	0	0	0	0	0	0	0	0	0	0	0	0	0	0	0	0	0

Source: Competitive Matches

=== Results by round ===
Round	1
Ground	
Result	
Position	

Source: Competitive Matches
A = Away; H = Home; W = Win; D = Draw; L = Loss

=== Matches ===
25 August 2024 1	Beitar Jerusalem	3-2	F.C. Ashdod	Tel Aviv
20:15 EEST	Twumasi 45+6'; Timothy Muzie 47'; Micha (yellow card) 56'; Kani 76'; Marcelin (yellow card) 77'	Report	Roy Levi (yellow card) 14'; Rosen (red card) 20'; Morozov 59' (o.g.) 86' (o.g.)	Stadium: Bloomfield Stadium; Attendance: 17,188; Referee: (Israel) Snir Levi

31 August 2024 2	Ironi Tiberias	1-0	Beitar Jerusalem	Nof HaGalil
20:00 EEST	Abu Akel (yellow card) 22'; Vehava (yellow card) 26'; Konstantini (yellow card) 56'; Bilenkyi 90+3'	Report	Cohen (yellow card) 68'; Nadav Markovitch (yellow card) 69' (yellow-red card) 76'	Stadium: Green Stadium; Attendance: 3,752; Referee: (Israel) Aviad Shiloach

15 September 2024 3	Beitar Jerusalem	2-0	Maccabi Netanya	Jerusalem
20:15 EEST	George 30'; Morozov (yellow card) 34' (yellow-red card) 34'; Micha (yellow card) 37'; Yona (yellow card) 45+6'; Shua (yellow card) 72'; Levi (yellow card) 86'; Timothy Muzie 90+3'	Report	Karem Jaber (yellow card) 45+5'; Levi (yellow card) 61'; Stoinov (yellow card) 87'	Stadium: Teddy Stadium; Attendance: 13,331; Referee: (Israel) Orel Grinfeld

28 September 2024 5	Maccabi Bnei Reineh	0-2	Beitar Jerusalem	Tel Aviv
20:00 EEST	Ljubisavljević (yellow card) 30'; Ihab Ghanayem (yellow card) 44'; Sambinha (yellow card) 57'; Bručić (yellow card) 69'; Fadida (yellow card) 71'; Abu Farchi (yellow card) 72'	Report	Micha (yellow card) 25'; George 54'; Shua 61'; Soro (yellow card) 78'	Stadium: Bloomfield Stadium; Referee: (Israel) Yoav Mizrahi

5 October 2024 6	Beitar Jerusalem	1-1	Ironi Kiryat Shmona	Jerusalem
20:00 EET	Shua (yellow card) 34'; Twumasi 50'	Report	Nidam 25'; Dego (yellow card) 69'; Mohamad Abu Rumi (yellow card) 90+6'	Stadium: Teddy Stadium; Referee: (Israel) Idan Layba

22 October 2024 4	Beitar Jerusalem	3-2	Maccabi Haifa	Jerusalem
19:30 EET	Timothy Muzie (yellow card) 20' (goal) 76'; Soro (yellow card) 23'; Twumasi 34'; Shua (yellow card) 45'; Dahan (yellow card) 61'; Jeno 71'	Report	David 21' 50' (yellow card) 61'; Jaber (yellow card) 40'; Nsimba (yellow card) 53'	Stadium: Teddy Stadium; Referee: (Israel) Gal Leibovitz

28 October 2024 8	Beitar Jerusalem	3-1	Maccabi Tel Aviv	Jerusalem
20:00 EET	Timothy Muzie (yellow card) 43' (goal) 48'; Marcelin (red card) 45+3'; Morozov (yellow card) 57'; Shua 82' (pen.); Kani 86'	Report	Turgeman 36' (yellow card) 45+4'; Yehezkel (yellow card) 45+3'	Stadium: Teddy Stadium; Referee: (Israel) Snir Levi

2 November 2024 9	Hapoel Hadera	0-4	Beitar Jerusalem	Netanya
19:30 EET	Yadin Itzhak Lugasi (yellow card) 34'; Cissé (red card) 69'; Einbinder (yellow card) 71'	Report	Twumasi 7'; Shua 31' (pen.); Morozov (yellow card) 34'; Timothy Muzie 60'; Yona 76'	Stadium: Netanya Stadium; Referee: (Israel) Yoav Mizrahi

5 November 2024 7	Bnei Sakhnin	2-1	Beitar Jerusalem	Acre
19:30 EET	Soteriou 12'; Mohammed Abu Nil (yellow card) 40'; Cudjoe 54'; Oméonga (yellow card) 90'; Matanel Tadisa (yellow card) 90+9'	Report	Marcelin (yellow card) 27'; George 57'; Soro (yellow card) 90+4'	Stadium: Acre Municipal Stadium; Referee: (Israel) Aviad Shiloach

9 November 2024 10	Beitar Jerusalem	1-0	Hapoel Haifa	Jerusalem
15:00 EET	Cohen (yellow card) 51'; Micha (yellow card) 69'; Jeno 90+5'	Report	Antilevsky (yellow card) 64'; Ben Harush (yellow card) 85'	Stadium: Teddy Stadium; Referee: (Israel) Gal Leibovitz

1 December 2024 11	Hapoel Jerusalem	3-3	Beitar Jerusalem	Jerusalem
20:30 EET	Don 5' 32'; Ibeh Ransom (red card) 59'; Ashta 83'; Agvadish (yellow card) 90+1'	Report	Morozov 8'; Shua 35'; Levi (yellow card) 51'; Twumasi 72'	Stadium: Teddy Stadium; Referee: (Israel) Orel Grinfeld

4 December 2024 12	Beitar Jerusalem	5-0	Maccabi Petah Tikva	Jerusalem
20:00 EET	Cohen 7' 13' (yellow card) 27'; George 8' 17'; Kani 42'	Report	Altoury (red card) 74'; Galabov (yellow card) 85'	Stadium: Teddy Stadium; Referee: (Israel) Sagi Berman

9 December 2024 13	Hapoel Be'er Sheva	4-1	Beitar Jerusalem	Be'er Sheva
20:30 EET	Kangwa 4'; Biton 8' 46'; Stoyanov 13'; Vítor (yellow card) 45+1'; Samer Farhud (yellow card) 56'	Report	Cohen (yellow card) 45'; George 77' (yellow card) 81'; Morozov (yellow card) 87'	Stadium: Turner Stadium; Referee: (Israel) Gal Leibovitz

14 December 2024 14	F.C. Ashdod	2-3	Beitar Jerusalem	Ashdod
19:30 EET	Tamam 23'; Roy Levi 41'; Luiyi de Lucas (yellow card) 54'; Ravid Abrgil (yellow card) 90'; Harush (yellow card) 90+1'	Report	Micha 21'; Kna'an 26' (o.g.); George (yellow card) 45+2'; Marcelin (yellow card) 71' (goal) 90+1'	Stadium: Yud-Alef Stadium; Referee: (Israel) Aviad Shiloach

23 December 2024 15	Beitar Jerusalem	1-1	Ironi Tiberias	Jerusalem
20:00 EET	Timothy Muzie (yellow card) 38'; Kani 69'; Shua (yellow card) 76'; Cohen (yellow card) 85'; Micha (yellow card) 90+2'	Report	Balilty (yellow card) 22'; Yonatan Teper (red card) 42'; Botaka 57' (pen.); Haroun Shapso (yellow card) 63'; Bilenkyi (yellow card) 73'; Abu Akel (yellow card) 90+1'	Stadium: Teddy Stadium; Referee: (Israel) David Fuxman

1 January 2025 16	Maccabi Netanya	3-0	Beitar Jerusalem	Netanya
20:00 EET	Heriberto Tavares 33' (yellow card) 70'; Karem Jaber 58'; Plakuschenko 81'; Yuval Sadeh (yellow card) 90+2'	Report	Dahan (yellow card) 20' (yellow-red card) 53'; Twumasi (yellow card) 37'; Soro (yellow card) 81'	Stadium: Netanya Stadium; Referee: (Israel) Yoav Mizrahi

6 January 2025 17	Maccabi Haifa	1-3	Beitar Jerusalem	Haifa
20:30 EET	Haziza (yellow card) 45+5'; Keouf (yellow card) 45+8'; Mohamed (yellow card) 45+8' (yellow-red card) 45+8'; Feingold (yellow card) 45+11'; Saief 67'; Saba (yellow card) 75'	Report	Shua 45+7'; Soro (yellow card) 58'; Zasno (yellow card) 72'; Miguel Silva (red card) 60'; Kani 83'; Twumasi 88'	Stadium: Sammy Ofer Stadium; Referee: (Israel) Orel Grinfeld

11 January 2025 18	Beitar Jerusalem	1-4	Maccabi Bnei Reineh	Jerusalem
18:00 EET	Atzili 6' (pen.); Marcelin (red card) 35'; Shua (yellow card) 43'	Report	Fadida 7' 47'; Sambinha 40'; Hadida (yellow card) 43'; Abu Farchi 90+5'	Stadium: Teddy Stadium; Referee: (Israel) Aviad Shiloach

== Group B ==
Pos	Team	Pld	W	D	L	GF	GA	GD	Pts	Qualification	MNE	BEI	HAH	HJE	ASH
1	Maccabi Netanya	4	3	1	0	13	4	+9	10	Semi-finals		1–1			5–0
2	Beitar Jerusalem	4	2	1	1	9	5	+4	7	5–8th classification play-offs			3–0	2–0	
3	Hapoel Hadera	4	2	0	2	5	8	−3	6	9–10th classification play-offs	2–5				2–0
4	Hapoel Jerusalem	4	1	0	3	5	7	−2	3	11–12th classification play-offs	1–2		0–1		
5	F.C. Ashdod	4	1	0	3	6	14	−8	3	13–14th classification play-offs		4–3		2–4	

Source: soccerway
Legend: Blue = home team win; Yellow = draw; Red = away team win.
Rules for classification: 1) points; 2) goal difference; 3) number of wins; 4) goals scored; 5) head to head; 6) higher position in last season.

31 July 2024 Group B	Beitar Jerusalem	3-0	Hapoel Hadera	Jerusalem
20:00 EEST	Morozov 2' (yellow card) 84'; Soro (yellow card) 16'; Micha 20'; George 47'	Report	Lior Rokach (yellow card) 18'; Dia Lababidi (yellow card) 84'	Stadium: Teddy Stadium; Referee: (Israel) Ohad Asulin

3 August 2024 Group B	F.C. Ashdod	4-3	Beitar Jerusalem	Ashdod
20:30 EEST	Kna'an (yellow card) 19'; Adir Levi 31'; Ravid Abrgil 49' 84'; Nahmani 67'	Report	Shua 21' (pen.) (yellow card) 76'; Micha 24' (yellow card) 90+2'; Morozov (yellow card) 83'; Twumasi 87' (pen.)	Stadium: Yud-Alef Stadium; Referee: (Israel) Gal Laibuvitz

6 August 2024 Group B	Beitar Jerusalem	2-0	Hapoel Jerusalem	Jerusalem
20:00 EEST	Twumasi 2'; Morozov 13'; Shua (yellow card) 41'; Marcelin (yellow card) 82'	Report	Amit Glazer (yellow card) 21'; Malmoud (yellow card) 38'; Ashta (yellow card) 48'; Ohad Almagor (yellow card) 56'; Yonathan Laish (yellow card) 87'	Stadium: Teddy Stadium; Referee: (Israel) David Fuxman

10 August 2024 Group B	Maccabi Netanya	1-1	Beitar Jerusalem	Netanya
20:30 EEST	Keller (yellow card) 45+2'; Itamar Shviro 88'	Report	Morozov (yellow card) 49'; Cohen (yellow card) 57'; Shua (yellow card) 76'; George 90+5'	Stadium: Netanya Stadium; Referee: (Israel) Gal Levi

19 August 2024 Play Off	Maccabi Petah Tikva	1-4	Beitar Jerusalem	Petah Tikva
20:00 EEST	Karo (yellow card) 18'; Gal Maatouk (yellow card) 49'; Hazan 87'	Report	George 8' 45+2'; Kani 15'; Dabush 73'; Dahan (yellow card) 84'	Stadium: HaMoshava Stadium; Referee: (Israel) Yoav Mizrahi

== State Cup ==
29 December 2024 Round Of 32	Kiryat Yam	2-2 (a.e.t.) (4-5 p)	Beitar Jerusalem	Acre
20:15 EET	Salim Amash (yellow card) 25'; Moshe Golan 70' (yellow card) 120+3'; Gil Haddad 85' (yellow card) 86'; Artur Alyenikov (yellow card) 87'; Amit Sarusi (yellow card) 116'; Abergil (red card) 120'	Report	Zasno (yellow card) 22'; Yona 39'; Shua (yellow card) 63'; George 90+1'	Stadium: Acre Municipal Stadium; Referee: (Israel) Abraham Klein
