= Jake Rozhansky =

American-Israeli soccer player

Jake Rozhansky ג'ייק רוזנסקי
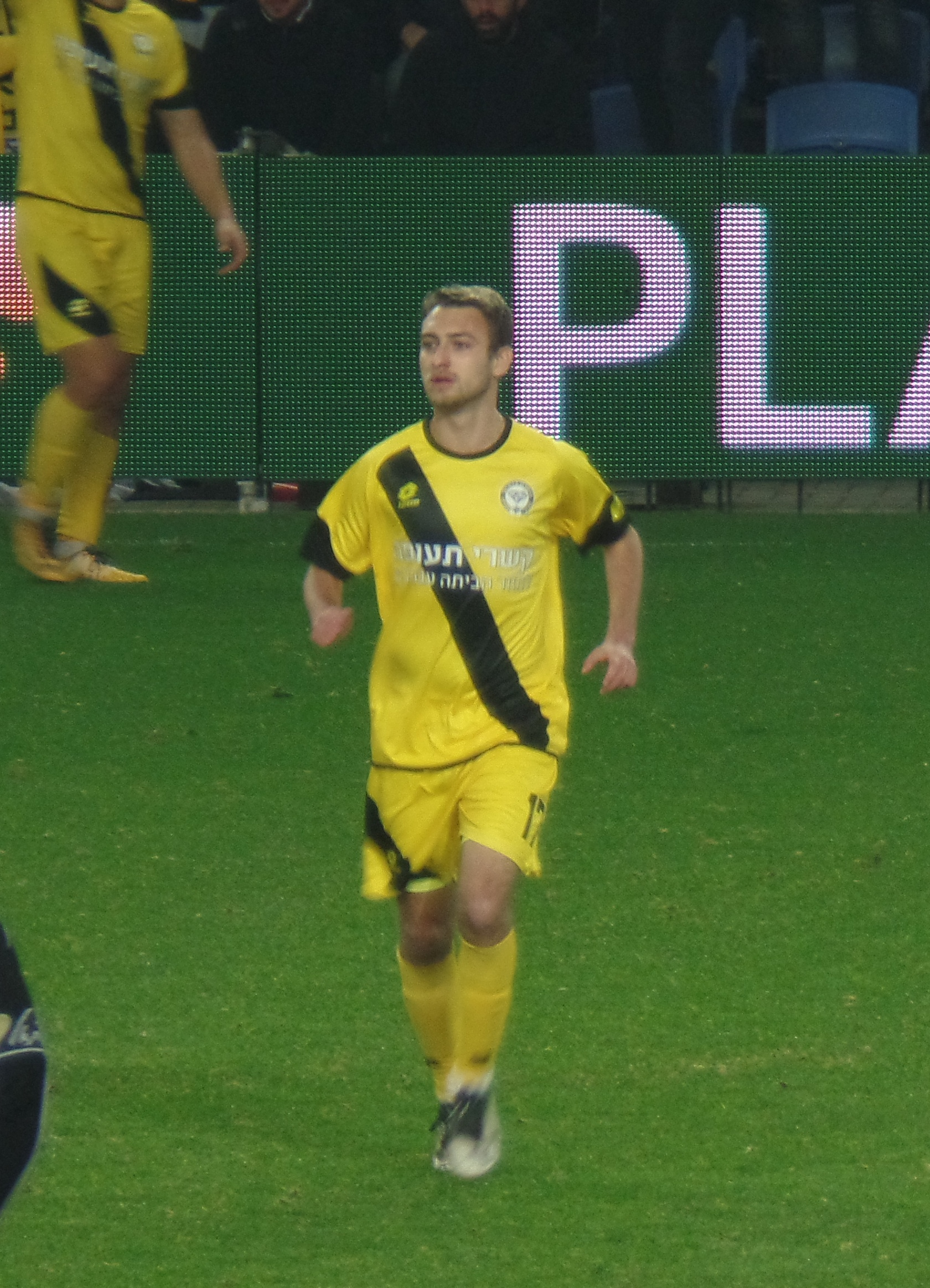
- Rozhansky with Netanya in 2018.

Personal information
- Full name: Jake Michael Rozhansky
- Date of birth: July 4, 1996 (age 30)
- Place of birth: Germantown, Maryland, United States
- Height: 5 ft 9 in (1.75 m)
- Position: Midfielder

Youth career
- 2006–2013: Olney Rangers
- 2013–2014: Bethesda Olney

College career
Years	Team	Apps	(Gls)
2014–2015	Virginia Cavaliers	37	(5)
2016–2017	Maryland Terrapins	40	(7)

Senior career*
Years	Team	Apps	(Gls)
2015	D.C. United U-23	6	(3)
2018–2019	Maccabi Netanya	13	(0)
2018–2019	→ Hapoel Katamon Jerusalem (loan)	28	(1)
2019–2020	Hapoel Afula	29	(1)
2020–2021	Maccabi Herzliya	11	(0)
2021–2023	New England Revolution II	45	(0)
2024	New York City FC II	0	(0)
- * Club domestic league appearances and goals as of December 9, 2022

Jake Michael Rozhansky (Hebrew: ג'ייק מייקל רוזנסקי; born 4 July 1996) is an American former professional soccer player who played as a midfielder. During his career, he has previously appeared for D.C. United U-23, Maccabi Netanya, Hapoel Katamon Jerusalem, Hapoel Afula, and Maccabi Herzliya.

Born in Germantown, Maryland, Rozhansky attended Montgomery Blair High School and played youth soccer with the Olney Rangers and Bethesda Olney clubs. He played his first two collegiate seasons at Virginia, winning a national title with the Cavaliers as a freshman, before transferring and spending his final two seasons at Maryland. While in college, Rozhansky appeared with D.C. United U-23 and represented the United States at the 2017 Maccabiah Games, winning a gold medal. He was drafted by Columbus Crew SC in the 2018 MLS SuperDraft, but instead chose to go overseas and sign in Israel with Maccabi Netanya. After two seasons with Netanya and a loan spell at Hapoel Katamon Jerusalem, Rozhansky joined Hapoel Afula in 2019.

A native-born American citizen, Rozhansky claimed Israeli citizenship as an adult through the Law of Return.

== Early life ==
Rozhansky was born on 4 July 1996 in Germantown, Maryland. He attended Montgomery Blair High School, but played just one year of high school soccer for the Blazers, instead spending his youth at the club level with Olney Rangers and Bethesda Olney. He won the Golden Ball at the 2013 US Youth Soccer National Championships during his final year with Olney Rangers. With Bethesda Olney, Rozhansky was part of the club's first team to take part in the U.S. Soccer Development Academy (USSDA), where they qualified for the national final. Among his teammates at Bethesda Olney were Jeremy Ebobisse, Chase Gasper, Carter Manley, and Gedion Zelalem.

While still in high school, Rozhansky was called up to multiple youth national team camps. In July 2012, he took part in a training camp for the United States U17 national team. Two years later, he was called up by the under-20s for a training camp in Raleigh, North Carolina. He was the subject of interest from English club Arsenal in 2012, but ultimately was not pursued by the Premier League side. Rozhansky committed to play college soccer at the University of Virginia. He was part of a recruiting class that also included Jeff Caldwell and Peter Pearson.

== College and amateur ==
Rozhansky made his Virginia debut on 29 August 2014, playing the entirety of a 1–0 victory over Old Dominion. He started all but two matches during his freshman season, helping the Cavaliers become national champions after defeating UCLA on penalties in the College Cup. In the second round of the NCAA Tournament, Rozhansky tallied his first collegiate goal to help Virginia advance past UNC Wilmington. He finished the season with one goal and four assists in 23 appearances and was named to both the Atlantic Coast Conference (ACC) All-Freshman Team and the College Cup All-Tournament Team.

Ahead of his sophomore year, Rozhansky was called up by the United States U23 national team, taking part in a college identification camp in the lead-up to the 2015 CONCACAF Men's Olympic Qualifying Championship. In the collegiate season, he led the Cavaliers in scoring, tallying four goals in 14 appearances. That goal-scoring mark included strikes in three straight games in September and a goal against Rider in the first round of the 2015 NCAA Tournament. Rozhansky was named to the All-ACC Second Team at the end of the 2015 season.

He initially left school to trial with clubs in Europe, including a stint at SC Freiburg in Germany, but instead returned to college and decided to transfer. He finished his time at Virginia with five goals and four assists in 37 appearances.

"He works extremely hard. He's able to get in and be creative in the other team's final third. He's also willing to do the work and keep possession for us in the middle third of the field. He's a proud player who's starting to get into his groove."

— Maryland head coach Sasho Cirovski, speaking about Rozhansky in September 2016.

After also considering Georgetown and UCLA, Rozhansky transferred to Maryland ahead of his junior season. He made his debut for the Terrapins in the 2016 season opener against UCLA, a match that ended in a 1–1 draw. He tallied his first Maryland goal on September 13, providing the match-winner in a double-overtime victory over Rutgers, then scored twice more before the end of the month. Rozhansky finished the season with three goals and eight assists in 21 appearances and was named to the 2017 Jewish Sports Review Division 1 Men's Soccer All-America Team.

He was named as a team captain ahead of his senior season, alongside George Campbell and Chase Gasper. In the 2018 season opener, Rozhansky tallied his first career multi-goal game, as the Terrapins defeated Santa Clara 4–2. He added a goal in September and one more in the first week of October, finishing the year with four goals and a team-high 9 assists in 19 appearances. At the end of the year, Rozhansky was named to the All-Big Ten Conference First Team. He finished his Maryland career with 7 goals and 17 assists from 40 appearances.

=== D.C. United U-23 ===
Following his freshman season at Virginia, Rozhansky appeared for D.C. United U-23 in the Premier Development League (PDL). He appeared in six matches and scored three goals for the club, including a brace against Baltimore Bohemians in June. During the summer of 2017, Rozhansky was also with the team, but the U-23s were not part of a league and only played exhibition matches.

=== Maccabiah Games ===
Ahead of his senior year of college, Rozhansky was selected to the United States squad to compete in the 2017 Maccabiah Games. He appeared in all six matches the Americans played in the tournament, finishing as the Golden Boot winner with six goals. In the championship match against Great Britain, Rozhansky scored a hat trick to carry the United States to a 3–0 victory and a gold medal. He later credited the tournament with opening the door for him to sign professionally in Israel, saying "If I hadn't gone to the Maccabiah Games I would not have decided to come play professionally in Israel. The Games provided me a way to further my professional career."

== Club career ==
Rozhansky was selected to take part in the 2018 MLS Combine, but dropped out and instead chose to sign overseas. Although he had already signed a contract in Israel, Rozhansky was still selected 44th overall in the 2018 MLS SuperDraft by Columbus Crew SC, who retained his Major League Soccer rights for two seasons.

=== Maccabi Netanya ===
After impressing during an initial trial, Rozhansky signed his first professional contract with newly promoted Israeli Premier League club Maccabi Netanya on 11 January 2018. Since he is Jewish, Rozhansky was able to claim Israeli citizenship and was classified as a domestic player. He made his debut for Netanya on January 29, replacing Aviv Avraham in the 84th minute of a 2–1 victory against Beitar Jerusalem. Rozhansky made 13 appearances for the Diamonds after signing, helping the club to a fifth-place league finish. His initial six-month contract expired in June, but on May 13 the club extended Rozhansky's contract for two more seasons.

==== 2018–19: Loan to Hapoel Katamon ====
Rozhansky began the 2018–19 season in the squad at Netanya, appearing in all five of the club's matches in the Toto Cup Al. In order to gain playing time, however, he was sent on loan on 11 September 2018, joining Hapoel Katamon Jerusalem in the Liga Leumit. Rozhansky made his debut in the second tier the next day, coming off the bench in a 1–0 victory against Hapoel Petah Tikva. His first start for Katamon came on September 25 in the final of the Toto Cup Leumit, a 1–0 victory against Hapoel Marmorek that saw the club win their first-ever cup title. Rozhansky continued to be a regular presence in the club's lineup throughout the season, although he primarily appeared as a substitute: 17 of his 28 league appearances on the year came off the bench. He tallied his first goal for the club, and his first professional goal, on April 15, providing the winning margin in a 2–1 victory over Hapoel Nazareth Illit. Rozhansky scored one goal in 31 appearances in all competitions for Hapoel Katamon, to go with his five appearances on the year for Maccabi Netanya. At the end of the season, however, he was informed by Netanya manager Slobodan Drapić that he was no longer in the club's plans and with one year left on his contract should look for a new club.

=== Hapoel Afula ===
After ending his contract with Netanya, Rozhansky joined Liga Leumit club Hapoel Afula on 21 June 2019. He signed for one year with an option for a second season. Just weeks before the season began, it was revealed that Rozhansky was one of seven players who could not be registered as the club did not have the money to pay their salaries. It was rumored that he may have to be released for the club to become financially compliant, but Rozhansky was eventually registered as a Hapoel Afula player. He missed the Toto Cup Leumit due to the confusion, eventually making his debut for Afula on September 23 in a league defeat against Hapoel Ashkelon. He scored his lone goal for the club on December 9, tallying the only score of a 1–0 victory over Hapoel Ramat Gan. Rozhansky departed the club at the end of the season after tallying one goal from 30 appearances, helping Afula stay in Liga Leumit through the relegation playoffs.

=== Maccabi Herzliya ===
On 3 September 2020, Rozhansky dropped down a division to sign with Liga Alef club Maccabi Herzliya. He made his debut on November 20, starting against Ironi Ashdod in the fifth round of the Israel State Cup. Rozhansky made 12 appearances in all competitions for Herzliya, his debut cup appearance the only one he made outside of league play. His last appearance for Herzliya came on March 24, 2021, in a defeat against Hapoel Azor.

=== New England Revolution II ===
Rozhansky returned to the United States on 1 April 2021 and signed with USL League One club New England Revolution II. He was immediately installed as the team captain, which was described as "a testament to his leadership ability" by SB Nation site The Bent Musket. Rozhansky made his debut in the 2021 season opener, a 1–0 victory against Fort Lauderdale CF on April 10. He played 76 minutes before being replaced by Morris Matthews. Rozhansky tallied a team-high six assists from 23 appearances during his first season in New England. At the end of the year, Revs II moved to the newly launched MLS Next Pro. Rozhansky re-signed with the team on a new contract in mid-February.

== Personal life ==
Rozhansky is the oldest of two children to his parents, Roman Rozhansky and Irina Mathews. Both of his parents were born in the Soviet Union, with his father from what is now Belarus and his mother from present-day Ukraine. Although he does not hold a passport from either of those countries, Rozhansky claimed Israeli citizenship as an adult through the Law of Return.

Rozhansky majored in government and politics while in college. After transferring to Maryland, he lived in the same dormitory as Sebastian Elney and Diego Silva.

== Career statistics ==
As of December 9, 2022

Appearances and goals by club, season and competition
Club	Season	League			National Cup (Note: All appearances in the Israel State Cup)		League Cup (Note: All appearances in the Toto Cup)		Continental		Other		Total	
Club	Season	Division	Apps	Goals	Apps	Goals	Apps	Goals	Apps	Goals	Apps	Goals	Apps	Goals
D.C. United U-23	2015	PDL	6	3	—		—		—		—		6	3
Maccabi Netanya	2017–18	Israeli Premier League	13	0	0	0	0	0	—		—		13	0
Maccabi Netanya	2018–19	Israeli Premier League	0	0	0	0	5	0	—		—		5	0
Maccabi Netanya	Total		13	0	0	0	5	0	0	0	0	0	18	0
Hapoel Katamon Jerusalem (loan)	2018–19	Liga Leumit	28	1	2	0	1	0	—		—		31	1
Hapoel Afula	2019–20	Liga Leumit	29	1	1	0	0	0	—		0	0	30	1
Maccabi Herzliya	2020–21	Liga Alef	11	0	1	0	—		—		—		12	0
New England Revolution II	2021	USL League One	23	0	—		—		—		—		23	0
New England Revolution II	2022	MLS Next Pro	22	0	—		—		—		—		22	0
New England Revolution II	2023	MLS Next Pro	0	0	—		—		—		0	0	0	0
New England Revolution II	Total		45	0	0	0	0	0	0	0	0	0	45	0
Career total			132	5	4	0	6	0	0	0	0	0	142	5

== Honors ==
Virginia

- College Cup: 2014

Maryland

- Big Ten Conference (regular season): 2016
- Big Ten Men's Soccer Tournament: 2016

Hapoel Katamon Jerusalem

- Toto Cup Leumit: 2018–2019

Individual

- US Youth Soccer National Championships Golden Ball: 2013
- U.S. Soccer Development Academy East Conference Team of the Year: 2014
- Atlantic Coast Conference All-Freshman Team: 2014
- College Cup All-Tournament Team: 2014
- Second Team All-ACC: 2015
- First Team All-Big Ten: 2017
- Jewish Sports Review Division I All-American: 2017
