= Omer Agvadish =

Israeli footballer (born 2000)

Omer Agvadish עומר אגבדיש
Personal information
- Full name: Omer Agvadish
- Date of birth: 30 December 2000 (age 25)
- Place of birth: Mata, Israel
- Height: 1.78 m (5 ft 10 in)
- Positions: Midfielder; right back

Team information
- Current team: Hapoel Jerusalem
- Number: 16

Youth career
- 2010–2017: Hapoel Katamon

Senior career*
Years	Team	Apps	(Gls)
2017–2020	Hapoel Katamon	13	(0)
2020–	Hapoel Jerusalem	143	(2)
- * Club domestic league appearances and goals as of 24 June 2026 ‡ National team caps and goals as of 1 June 2023

Omer Agvadish (Hebrew: עומר אגבדיש; born 30 December 2000) is an Israeli professional footballer who plays as a midfielder for Israeli Premier League club Hapoel Jerusalem.

== Club career ==
=== Hapoel Jerusalem ===
Agvadish started his football career in the Hapoel Katamon's children. On 21 May 2018 made his senior debut in the 1–0 win against Hapoel Afula. One 2020–21 season the club merged to Hapoel Jerusalem and Agvadish became a senior squad player.

== Career statistics ==
=== Club ===
As of 1 June 2024

Club	Season	League			State Cup		Toto Cup		Continental		Other		Total	
Club	Season	Division	Apps	Goals	Apps	Goals	Apps	Goals	Apps	Goals	Apps	Goals	Apps	Goals
Hapoel Katamon	2017–18	Liga Leumit	1	0	0	0	0	0	0	0	0	0	1	0
Hapoel Katamon	2018–19	Liga Leumit	8	0	0	0	4	1	0	0	0	0	12	1
Hapoel Katamon	2019–20	Liga Leumit	4	0	0	0	3	0	0	0	0	0	7	0
Hapoel Jerusalem	2020–21	Liga Leumit	32	1	1	0	4	0	0	0	0	0	37	1
Hapoel Jerusalem	2021–22	Israeli Premier League	21	0	1	0	0	0	0	0	0	0	22	0
Hapoel Jerusalem	2022–23	Israeli Premier League	17	0	3	1	1	0	0	0	0	0	21	1
Hapoel Jerusalem	2023–24	Israeli Premier League	25	0	2	0	5	0	0	0	0	0	32	0
Hapoel Jerusalem	2024–25	Israeli Premier League	0	0	0	0	0	0	0	0	0	0	0	0
Career total			108	1	7	1	17	1	0	0	0	0	132	2

== See also ==
- List of Israelis
