= 2018–19 Toto Cup Leumit =

Tournament details
- Country: Israel
- Teams: 16

Final positions
- Champions: Hapoel Katamon Jerusalem (1st title)
- Runners-up: Hapoel Marmorek

The 2018–19 Toto Cup Leumit was the 29th season of the second tier League Cup (as a separate competition) since its introduction. It was divided into two stages. First, sixteen Liga Leumit teams were divided into four regionalized groups, with the winners advancing to the semi-finals, while the rest of the clubs were scheduled to play classification play-offs. However, the classification matches were only partly played.

In the final, played on 25 December 2018, Hapoel Katamon Jerusalem defeated Hapoel Marmorek 1–0.

== Group stage ==
Groups were allocated according to geographic distribution of the clubs. The groups were announced by the IFA on 19 June 2018.

=== Group A ===
Pos	Team	Pld	W	D	L	GF	GA	GD	Pts	Qualification or relegation	MAN	HNI	HIX	HAC
1	Maccabi Ahi Nazareth	3	2	1	0	6	3	+3	7	Qualified to Semi-finals	—	-	-	2–1
2	Hapoel Nazareth Illit	3	1	2	0	6	3	+3	5	5-8th classification play-offs	1–1	—	2–2	-
3	Hapoel Iksal	3	1	1	1	5	5	0	4	9-12th classification play-offs	1–3	-	—	2–0
4	Hapoel Acre	3	0	0	3	1	7	−6	0	13-16th classification play-offs	-	0–3	-	—

Updated to match(es) played on 9 August 2018. Source: Israel Football Association
Rules for classification: 1) points; 2) goal difference; 3) number of wins; 4) goals scored; 5) head to head; 6)deciding match.

=== Group B ===
Pos	Team	Pld	W	D	L	GF	GA	GD	Pts	Qualification or relegation	HPT	HKS	HRS	HAF
1	Hapoel Petah Tikva	3	2	1	0	5	2	+3	7	Qualified to Semi-finals	—	1–1	-	-
2	Hapoel Kfar Saba	3	1	2	0	4	2	+2	5	5-8th classification play-offs	-	—	1–1	2–0
3	Hapoel Ramat HaSharon	3	1	1	1	5	3	+2	4	9-12th classification play-offs	1–2	-	—	-
4	Hapoel Afula	3	0	0	3	0	7	−7	0	13-16th classification play-offs	0–2	-	0–3	—

Updated to match(es) played on 9 August 2018. Source: Israel Football Association
Rules for classification: 1) points; 2) goal difference; 3) number of wins; 4) goals scored; 5) head to head; 6)deciding match.

=== Group C ===
Pos	Team	Pld	W	D	L	GF	GA	GD	Pts	Qualification or relegation	HMR	TAR	HRG	HBL
1	Hapoel Marmorek	3	2	1	0	2	0	+2	7	Qualified to Semi-finals	—	-	0–0	1–0
2	Beitar Tel Aviv Ramla	3	2	0	1	6	1	+5	6	5-8th classification play-offs	0–1	—	-	-
3	Hapoel Ramat Gan	3	1	1	1	2	5	−3	4	9-12th classification play-offs	-	0–4	—	-
4	Hapoel Bnei Lod	3	0	0	3	1	5	−4	0	13-16th classification play-offs	-	0–2	1–2	—

Updated to match(es) played on 9 August 2018. Source: Israel Football Association
Rules for classification: 1) points; 2) goal difference; 3) number of wins; 4) goals scored; 5) head to head; 6)deciding match.

=== Group D ===
Pos	Team	Pld	W	D	L	GF	GA	GD	Pts	Qualification or relegation	HKJ	SNZ	HRL	HAS
1	Hapoel Katamon Jerusalem	3	2	1	0	3	1	+2	7	Qualified to Semi-finals	—	-	1–0	-
2	Sektzia Nes Tziona	3	1	2	0	5	2	+3	5	5-8th classification play-offs	1–1	—	3–0	-
3	Hapoel Rishon LeZion	3	1	0	2	2	5	−3	3	9-12th classification play-offs	-	-	—	2–1
4	Hapoel Ashkelon	3	0	1	2	2	4	−2	1	13-16th classification play-offs	0–1	1–1	-	—

Updated to match(es) played on 9 August 2018. Source: Israel Football Association
Rules for classification: 1) points; 2) goal difference; 3) number of wins; 4) goals scored; 5) head to head; 6)deciding match.

== Classification play-offs ==
=== 13-16th classification play-offs ===
17 August 2018	Hapoel Bnei Lod	1–0	Hapoel Acre	Lod
	Merey 28'	Report		Stadium: Municipal Stadium; Referee: Dror Cohen

20 August 2018	Hapoel Ashkelon	1–0	Hapoel Afula	Ashkelon
	Ben David 38' (o.g.)	Report		Stadium: Sala Stadium; Referee: Niv Schteif

=== 9-12th classification play-offs ===
16 August 2018	Hapoel Ramat Gan	0–2	Hapoel Iksal	Ramat Gan
		Report	53' Tzemach; 64' Karakra	Stadium: Ramat Gan Stadium; Referee: Dekel Tzino

17 August 2018	Hapoel Rishon LeZion	1–0	Hapoel Ramat HaSharon	Rishon LeZion
	Shviro 30'	Report		Stadium: Haberfeld Stadium; Referee: Or Lugasi

=== 5-8th classification play-offs ===
21 August 2018	Beitar Tel Aviv Ramla	2–0	Hapoel Nazareth Illit	Ramla
	Badash 59'; Shetach 89'	Report		Stadium: Municipal Stadium

16 August 2018	Sektzia Nes Tziona	3–4	Hapoel Kfar Saba	Ness Ziona
	Beit-Yaakov 8'; Sharon 35'; Levy 52'	Report	70' (pen.), 83' Fadida; 90+2' Abutbul; 90+6' Itzrin	Stadium: Ness Ziona Stadium; Referee: Majd Rushrush

== Finals ==
=== Semi-finals ===
16 August 2018	Hapoel Marmorek	2–1	Maccabi Ahi Nazareth	Ramla
	Bala 27'; Amsis 53'	Report	84' Exbard	Stadium: Municipal Stadium; Referee: Snir Levi

20 August 2018	Hapoel Katamon Jerusalem	3–0	Hapoel Petah Tikva	Jerusalem
	Agade 42'; Naor 54'; Tamir 73'	Report		Stadium: Teddy Stadium; Referee: Aviad Yahav-Hai Shiloach

=== Final ===
25 September 2018

Hapoel Katamon Jerusalem	1–0	Hapoel Marmorek
Agade 62'	Report

Ramat Gan Stadium
Attendance: Ramat Gan
Referee: Shalev Sasson

== Final rankings ==
R	Team
1	Hapoel Katamon Jerusalem
2	Hapoel Marmorek
3-4	Hapoel Petah Tikva; Maccabi Ahi Nazareth
5-6	Beitar Tel Aviv Ramla; Hapoel Kfar Saba
7-8	Hapoel Nazareth Illit; Sektzia Nes Tziona
9-10	Hapoel Iksal; Hapoel Rishon LeZion
11-12	Hapoel Ramat Gan; Hapoel Ramat HaSharon
13-14	Hapoel Bnei Lod; Hapoel Ashkelon
15-16	Hapoel Acre; Hapoel Afula

== See also ==
- 2018–19 Toto Cup Al
- 2018–19 Liga Leumit
- 2018–19 Israel State Cup
