= Jean Marcelin =

Malagasy footballer (born 2000)

Personal information
- Full name: Jean Harisson Marcelin
- Date of birth: 12 February 2000 (age 26)
- Place of birth: Le Port, Réunion
- Height: 1.97 m (6 ft 6 in)
- Position: Defender

Team information
- Current team: Rapid Wien
- Number: 24

Youth career
- 2007–2011: Du Port
- 2011–2016: Jeanne d'Arc
- 2011–2018: Auxerre

Senior career*
Years	Team	Apps	(Gls)
2017–2020	Auxerre II	36	(1)
2018–2020	Auxerre	21	(0)
2020–2023	Monaco	0	(0)
2020–2023	Monaco II	4	(0)
2020–2021	→ Cercle Brugge (loan)	20	(1)
2022–2023	→ Cercle Brugge (loan)	20	(1)
2023–2024	Bordeaux	17	(0)
2024–2025	Beitar Jerusalem	30	(3)
2025–	Rapid Wien	3	(0)

International career^{‡}
2018–2019	France U19	5	(2)
2025–	Madagascar	2	(0)
- * Club domestic league appearances and goals as of 20 November 2026 ‡ National team caps and goals as of 18:55, 20 November 2026 (UTC)

Jean Harisson Marcelin (born 12 February 2000) is a professional footballer who plays as a defender for Austrian Football Bundesliga club Rapid Wien. Born in France, he plays for the Madagascar national team.

== Club career ==
Having Malagasy forebears from his father, on 3 February 2018, Marcelin signed a professional contract with Auxerre. He made his professional debut for Auxerre in a 1–0 Ligue 2 win over Nancy on 17 August 2018.

In January 2020, Marcelin joined Ligue 1 club Monaco.

On 23 August 2022, Marcelin returned to Cercle Brugge in Belgium on a new loan.

== International career ==
Marcelin debuted for the France U19s in a 4–0 friendly win over the Armenia U19s, a match in which he scored a goal. He was called up to the Madagascar national team for a set of 2026 FIFA World Cup qualification matches in March 2025. Marcelin made his debut on 19 March 2025 in a World Cup qualifier against the Central African Republic.

== Career statistics ==
As of match played 27 July 2025

Appearances and goals by club, season and competition
Club	Season	League			Cup		League Cup		Europe		Other		Total	
Club	Season	Division	Apps	Goals	Apps	Goals	Apps	Goals	Apps	Goals	Apps	Goals	Apps	Goals
Auxerre B	2018–19	National 3	16	0	—		—		—		—		16	0
Auxerre	2018–19	Ligue 2	5	0	1	0	2	1	—		—		8	1
Auxerre	2019–20	Ligue 2	16	0	0	0	1	0	—		—		17	0
Auxerre	Total		21	0	1	0	3	1	—		—		25	1
As Monaco	2020–21	Ligue 1	0	0	0	0	—		0	0	—		0	0
AS Monaco II	2020–21	CFA 2	1	0	—		—		—		—		1	0
AS Monaco II	2021–22	CFA 2	3	0	—		—		—		—		3	0
AS Monaco II	Total		4	0	—		—		—		—		4	0
Cercle Brugge (loan)	2020–21	Belgian Pro League	20	1	2	1	—		—		—		22	2
Cercle Brugge (loan)	2022–23	Belgian Pro League	20	1	—		—		—		—		20	1
Bordeaux	2023–24	Ligue 2	17	0	4	1	—		—		—		21	1
Beitar Jerusalem	2024–25	Israeli Premier League	30	3	3	0	0	0	—		—		33	3
Rapid Wien	2025–26	Austrian Bundesliga	0	0	1	0	—		0	0	—		1	0
Career total			128	5	11	2	3	1	0	0	0	0	142	8
