= Noam Malmoud =

Israeli footballer (born 2002)

Noam Malmoud נועם מלמוד
Personal information
- Full name: Noam Gil Malmoud
- Date of birth: 2 August 2002 (age 24)
- Place of birth: Jerusalem, Israel
- Position: Centre-back

Team information
- Current team: Hapoel Jerusalem
- Number: 3

Youth career
- 2016–2020: Hapoel Katamon

Senior career*
Years	Team	Apps	(Gls)
2019–2020	Hapoel Katamon	6	(0)
2020–	Hapoel Jerusalem	149	(1)

International career
2022–2024	Israel U21	9	(0)
- * Club domestic league appearances and goals as of 24 June 2026

Noam Gil Malmoud (Hebrew: נועם מלמוד; born 29 March 2002) is an Israeli professional footballer who plays as a centre back for Israeli Premier League club Hapoel Jerusalem.

== Club career ==
=== Hapoel Jerusalem ===
Malmoud started his football career in the Hapoel Katamon's children. On 25 December 2019 made his senior debut in the 1–0 win against Hapoel Rishon LeZion. One season later the club merged to Hapoel Jerusalem and Malmoud became a senior squad player.

On 23 September 2022 made his debut for the Israel U21 against Ireland U21.

== Career statistics ==
=== Club ===
As of 1 June 2026

Club	Season	League			State Cup		Toto Cup		Continental		Other		Total	
Club	Season	Division	Apps	Goals	Apps	Goals	Apps	Goals	Apps	Goals	Apps	Goals	Apps	Goals
Hapoel Katamon	2019–20	Liga Leumit	6	0	0	0	0	0	0	0	0	0	6	0
Hapoel Jerusalem	2020–21	Liga Leumit	22	0	2	0	4	0	0	0	0	0	28	0
Hapoel Jerusalem	2021–22	Israeli Premier League	19	0	1	0	5	0	0	0	0	0	25	0
Hapoel Jerusalem	2022–23	Israeli Premier League	25	0	1	0	3	0	0	0	0	0	29	0
Hapoel Jerusalem	2023–24	Israeli Premier League	24	0	2	0	0	0	0	0	0	0	26	0
Hapoel Jerusalem	2024–25	Israeli Premier League	31	1	1	0	4	0	0	0	0	0	37	1
Hapoel Jerusalem	2025–26	Israeli Premier League	27	0	1	0	3	0	0	0	0	0	31	0
Career total			154	1	8	0	19	0	0	0	0	0	182	1

== See also ==
- List of Israelis
