= 2023 New England Revolution II season =

New England Revolution II
2023 season
- Owner: The Kraft Group
- Head coach: Clint Peay
- Stadium: Gillette Stadium
- MLS Next Pro: Eastern Conference: 2nd
- MLS Next Pro Playoffs: Lost Conference Final
Home colors	Away colors

The 2023 New England Revolution II season was the fourth season in the soccer team's history, where they competed in the third division of American soccer, MLS Next Pro. New England Revolution II, as a child club of New England Revolution of Major League Soccer, were barred from participating in the 2023 U.S. Open Cup. New England Revolution II played their home games at Gillette Stadium, located in Foxborough, Massachusetts, United States.

== Club ==
=== Roster ===
Roster Update: Dec 9, 2022:
As of August 4, 2023.

No.	Pos.	Nat.	Name
99	FW	(United States)	Jordan Adebayo-Smith
48	DF	(United States)	Jacob Akanyirige
40	MF	(Ghana)	Ben Awashie
10	MF	(United States)	Esmir Bajraktarevic+
16	MF	(United States)	Joshua Bolma+
42	MF	(United States)	Brandonn Bueno
81	GK	(United States)	Nico Campuzano
44	DF	(France)	Pierre Cayet
15	MF	(Argentina)	Tomás Chancalay+
39	FW	(Brazil)	Marcos Dias
19	FW	(United States)	Olger Escobar
89	FW	(United States)	Malcolm Fry
35	MF	(Canada)	Nakye Greenidge-Duncan
52	DF	(Brazil)	Jose Italo dos Santos
98	GK	(United States)	Jacob Jackson+
38	MF	(United States)	Patrick Leal
26	MF	(United States)	Tommy McNamara+
76	DF	(United States)	Peyton Miller
65	MF	(Canada)	Noble Okello
22	MF	(United States)	Jack Panayotou+
41	DF	(United States)	Colby Quiñones
72	MF	(Costa Rica)	Damian Rivera+
32	MF	(United States)	Jake Rozhansky
37	DF	(United States)	Victor Souza
43	DF	(United States) (Uruguay)	Tiago Suarez
55	FW	(Brazil)	Weverton
60	GK	(United States)	Max Weinstein

+ On loan from first team

=== Academy Roster ===
No.	Pos.	Nat.	Name
5	FW	(United States)	Gianluca Armellino
30	MF	(United States)	Ezra Widman
56	DF	(United States)	Jack Burkhardt
31	MF	(United States)	Eric Klein
54	MF	(United States)	Cristiano Oliveira
53	MF	(United States)	Jamie Kabuusu
42	MF	(United States)	Alex Parvu
90	GK	(United States)	Ryan Carney

=== Coaching staff ===
Name	Position
(United States) Clint Peay	Head coach
(United States) Marcelo Santos	Assistant coach
(Japan) Yuta Nomura	Assistant coach (Goalkeepers)

== Competitions ==
=== Preseason ===
February 11	New England Revolution II	1–5	Tampa Bay Rowdies (USL-C)	St Petersburg, Florida
	Adebayo-Smith 30'	Report	Mkosana 22'; Harris 50'; Lasso 57'; Martinez 78'; Williams	Stadium: Al Lang Stadium

February 15	New England Revolution II	0–0	Colorado Rapids 2	Sarasota, Florida

February 18	New England Revolution II	2–3	Orlando City B	Sarasota, Florida
	Bajraktarevic; Adebayo-Smith	Report

February 26	New England Revolution II	1–1	UNH	Foxboro, Massachusetts
	Adebayo-Smith	Report	Goal	Stadium: Gillette Stadium

March 5	New England Revolution II	0–2	Hartford Athletic (USL-C)	Foxboro, Massachusetts
		Report	,	Stadium: Gillette Stadium

March 11	New England Revolution II	4–2	CF Montreal U23	Foxboro, Massachusetts
	Dias; Burkhardt; Adebayo-Smith; Fry	Report	,	Stadium: Gillette Stadium

March 17	New England Revolution II	7–3	Gold Star FC Detroit	Foxboro, Massachusetts
	Adebayo-Smith,, Bueno, Dias; Weverton	Report		Stadium: Gillette Stadium

=== MLS NEXT Pro ===
==== Standings ====
Eastern Conference

Pos	Div	Team	Pld	W	SOW	SOL	L	GF	GA	GD	Pts	Qualification
1	NE	Crown Legacy FC	28	19	4	1	4	60	34	+26	66	Qualification for the Conference semifinals
2	NE	New England Revolution II	28	14	6	2	6	57	41	+16	56	Qualification for the Playoffs
3	CT	Columbus Crew 2	28	16	3	0	9	58	46	+12	54	Qualification for the Playoffs
4	NE	New York Red Bulls II	28	14	3	3	8	53	36	+17	51	Qualification for the Playoffs
5	CT	Orlando City B	28	13	2	3	10	59	61	−2	46	Qualification for the Playoffs

Source: MLSNP Eastern Conference
Rules for classification: 1) points; 2) total wins; 3) total goal differential; 4) total goals scored; 5) fewer disciplinary points; 6) away goal differential; 7) away goals scored; 8) home goals differential; 9) home goals scored; 10) coin toss (2 clubs tied) or drawing of lots (≥3 clubs tied)

Overall table

Pos	Team	Pld	W	SOW	SOL	L	GF	GA	GD	Pts	Awards
2	Crown Legacy FC	28	19	4	1	4	60	34	+26	66	U.S. Open Cup First Round
3	Tacoma Defiance	28	14	6	3	5	57	36	+21	57	
4	New England Revolution II	28	14	6	2	6	57	41	+16	56	
5	Columbus Crew 2	28	16	3	0	9	58	46	+12	54	
6	New York Red Bulls II	28	14	3	3	8	53	36	+17	51	U.S. Open Cup First Round

Source: MLSNP
Rules for classification: 1) points; 2) total wins; 3) total goal differential; 4) total goals scored; 5) fewer disciplinary points; 6) away goal differential; 7) away goals scored; 8) home goals differential; 9) home goals scored; 10) coin toss (2 clubs tied) or drawing of lots (≥3 clubs tied)

==== Results summary ====
Overall								Home						Away					
Pld	W	D	L	GF	GA	GD	Pts	W	D	L	GF	GA	GD	W	D	L	GF	GA	GD
28	14	8	6	57	41	+16	50	8	5	1	32	15	+17	6	3	5	25	26	−1

Source: MLS NEXT Pro

==== Results by round ====
Round	1	2	3	4	5	6	7	8	9	10	11	12	13	14	15	16	17	18	19	20	21	22	23	24	25	26	27	28
Stadium	A	H	H	A	H	H	A	A	A	H	H	A	H	H	A	H	A	A	H	A	H	A	H	A	A	H	H	A
Result	W	W	W	L	L	SW	L	W	W	W	W	L	SW	W	L	SW	SW	W	W	SL	SL	W	W	SW	W	W	SW	L
Position (East)	4	3	1	2	3	4	4	3	3	2	2	2	2	2	3	3	2	2	2	2	3	2	2	2	2	2	2	2

A = Away; H = Home; W = Win; L = Loss; SL = Shootout Loss; SW = Shootout Win

==== Match results ====
March 26, 2023 1	Atlanta United 2	2–3	New England Revolution II	Kennesaw, Georgia
7:30 PM EDT	McFadden 37' (o.g.); Raimar 84'; Firmino (penalty scored) 90'	Report	Rozhansky (yellow card) 45', (goal) 52'; Adebayo-Smith (yellow card) 55'; Cayet 60'; Awashie (yellow card) 73'	Stadium: Fifth Third Bank Stadium; Referee: Luis Guardia

April 2, 2023 2	New England Revolution II	2–1	New York City FC II	Foxborough, Massachusetts
8:00 PM EDT	Adebayo-Smith 24'; Jake Rozhansky (yellow card) 45'; Miller (yellow card) 79'; Damian Rivera (yellow card) 84'; Bajraktarevic 89'	Report	Benalcazar (yellow card) 40'; Denis 43'; Elias (yellow card) 45'	Stadium: Gillette Stadium; Referee: Sergii Boiko

April 10, 2023 3	New England Revolution II	5–1	Philadelphia Union II	Foxborough, Massachusetts
1:00 PM EDT	Rivera 21'; Adebayo-Smith 29'; Cayet (yellow card) 38'; Bajraktarevic 49'; Fry 54'; Panayotou (yellow card) 81'; Bueno (penalty scored) 89'	Report	Stojanovic (penalty scored) 10'; Riasco (yellow card) 64'; Villero (yellow card) 67'	Stadium: Gillette Stadium; Referee: José Carlos Rivero

April 16, 2023 4	Columbus Crew 2	3–0	New England Revolution II	Columbus, Ohio
1:00 PM EDT	Parente 7', (yellow card) 87'; Russell-Rowe 17'; Hughes (yellow card) 68'; Micaletto 81', (yellow card) 83'	Report	Akanyirige (yellow card) 30'	Stadium: Historic Crew Stadium; Referee: Nabil Bensalah

April 21, 2023 5	New England Revolution II	0–1	New York Red Bulls II	Foxborough, Massachusetts
7:00 PM EDT	Bueno (penalty missed) 20'; Cayet (yellow card) 21' (yellow-red card) 90+2'; Suarez (yellow card) 44'; Awashie (yellow card) 53'; Souza (yellow card) 72'	Report	Kasule (yellow card) 43'; Ruiz (yellow card) 52'; Ofori (yellow card) 65'; Thomas (penalty scored) 76'	Stadium: Gillette Stadium; Referee: Luis Arroyo

April 30, 2023 6	New England Revolution II	5–5 (5–4 SO)	FC Cincinnati 2	Foxborough, Massachusetts
5:00 PM EDT	Rivera 16', 75'; Dias (penalty scored) 19', (penalty scored) 85'; Adebayo-Smith 41'; Awashie (yellow card) 72'	Report	Ordóñez 22', 31'; Adams 53'; Thomas 61'; Jimenez (yellow card) 79'; Cayet 90' (o.g.)	Stadium: Gillette Stadium; Referee: Abdou Ndiaye

May 6, 2023 7	New York City FC II	4–2	New England Revolution II	New York City, New York
7:00 PM EDT	Denis 11'; Rando (yellow card) 69'; Meyrs 81'; Benalcazar (penalty scored) 84', (penalty scored) 90+5'	Report	Dias (penalty scored) 38', (penalty scored) 70'; Miller (yellow card) 40' (yellow-red card) 64'; Awashie (yellow card) 58'	Stadium: Belson Stadium; Referee: Calin Radosav

May 14, 2023 8	Toronto FC II	2–3	New England Revolution II	Toronto, Ontario
7:00 PM EDT	Catavolo 3'; Pearlman (yellow card) 34'; Batiz 39'	Report	Cimermancic 44' (o.g.); Cayet (yellow card) 81'; Rivera 84', 85'	Stadium: York Lions Stadium; Referee: Aubrey Kotelko

May 21, 2023 9	Philadelphia Union II	3–4	New England Revolution II	Chester, Pennsylvania
3:00 PM EDT	Donovan 17', 51'; Olney 24'; Villero (yellow card) 40' (yellow-red card) 86'; Westfield (yellow card) 43'	Report	Bajraktarevic 10', 75', 90+1'; Dias 82'	Stadium: Subaru Park; Referee: Jonathan Bilinski

May 25, 2023 10	New England Revolution II	2–0	Columbus Crew 2	Foxborough, Massachusetts
7:00 PM EDT	Adebayo-Smith 34'; Awashie 67'; Rozhansky (yellow card) 82'; Weverton (yellow card) 86'	Report	Roberts (yellow card) 62'; Mbumba (yellow card) 66'	Stadium: Gillette Stadium; Referee: John Griggs

May 28, 2023 11	New England Revolution II	1–0	Inter Miami CF II	Foxborough, Massachusetts
6:00 PM EDT	Cayet 8'; Rozhansky (yellow card) 55'; Akanyirige (yellow card) 69'; Jackson (yellow card) 90'	Report	Mendez (yellow card) 16'; Perkovich (yellow card) 27'; Sar-Sar (red card) 57'; Sunderland (yellow card) 84'	Stadium: Gillette Stadium; Referee: John Matto

June 4, 2023 12	New York Red Bulls II	4–1	New England Revolution II	Montclair, New Jersey
7:00 PM EDT	Hall 4'; Thomas 39'; Donkor 45+1'; Salinas (yellow card) 48'; Kasule 71'; Sofo (yellow card) 86'	Report	Panayotou 7'	Stadium: MSU Soccer Park at Pittser Field; Referee: Alexis Da Silva

June 11, 2023 13	New England Revolution II	2–2 (4–3 SO)	Chicago Fire FC II	Foxborough, Massachusetts
7:00 PM EDT	Panayotou 17'; Adebayo-Smith 21', (yellow card) 31'; Bolma (yellow card) 45+1'	Report	Hernandez 14'; Egan (yellow card) 48' (yellow-red card) 52'; Fleming 62'	Stadium: Gillette Stadium; Referee: Thomas Snyder

June 14, 2023 14	New England Revolution II	1–0	New York City FC II	Foxborough, Massachusetts
7:00 PM EDT	Fry 57'; Dias (penalty missed) 75'	Report	Elias (yellow card) 36'; McFarlane (yellow card) 61'; Yagudayev (yellow card) 74'	Stadium: Gillette Stadium; Referee: Christian Centeno

June 18, 2023 15	FC Cincinnati 2	2–1	New England Revolution II	Highland Heights, Kentucky
6:00 PM EDT	Turcios (yellow card) 47'; Valenzuela 51'; Dupont (yellow card) 60'; Marshall (yellow card) 78'; Thomas (yellow card) 90+1'; Mills (yellow card) 90+2'; Halsey (yellow card) 90+5'	Report	Souza 45+3' (o.g.); Ítalo (yellow card) 58'; Rozhansky (yellow card) 70'; Suarez (yellow card) 87'; Adebayo-Smith 90+3', (yellow card) 90+4'	Stadium: NKU Soccer Stadium; Referee: Amiel Aleman

June 23, 2023 16	New England Revolution II	1–1 (4–2 SO)	Toronto FC II	Foxborough, Massachusetts
8:00 PM EDT	Adebayo-Smith 37', (yellow card) 42'; Dias (yellow card) 86'	Report	Olguin (yellow card) 15'; Walkes (yellow card) 19'; Altobelli 61'; Adenuga (yellow card) 71'; Goulbourne (yellow card) 86'; Faria (yellow card) 90+2'	Stadium: Gillette Stadium; Referee: Calin Radosav

July 2, 2023 17	Huntsville City FC	0–0 (4–5 SO)	New England Revolution II	Huntsville, Alabama
7:00 PM EDT	N'Sa (yellow card) 39'; Rad (yellow card) 50'	Report	Suárez (yellow card) 45+1'; Ítalo (yellow card) 59'; Souza (yellow card) 72'	Stadium: Joe W. Davis Stadium; Attendance: 4,325; Referee: Katherine McCormick

July 9, 2023 18	Inter Miami CF II	0–2	New England Revolution II	Fort Lauderdale, Florida
6:00 PM EDT	Morales (yellow card) 13'; Valencia (yellow card) 46'	Report	Miller 51'; Ítalo (yellow card) 84'; Akanyirige (yellow card) 86'; Fry 88'	Stadium: DRV PNK Stadium; Referee: Jonathan Bilinski

July 12, 2023 19	New England Revolution II	3–1	Crown Legacy FC	Foxborough, Massachusetts
11:00 AM EDT	Dias 21'; Cayet (yellow card) 47'; Adebayo-Smith 52'; Miller 69'	Report	Poreba (penalty scored) 88'	Stadium: Gillette Stadium; Referee: Hao Zhong

July 30, 2023 20	Chicago Fire FC II	1–1 (5–3 SO)	New England Revolution II	Bridgeview, Illinois
7:00 PM EDT	Ostrem (yellow card) 26'; Gal (yellow card) 54'; Hernandez 62'; Glasgow (yellow card) 87'	Report	McNamara (yellow card) 51'; Panayotou 59'; Rozhansky (yellow card) 73'; Cayet (yellow card) 82'	Stadium: SeatGeek Stadium; Referee: Muhammad Hassan

August 6, 2023 21	New England Revolution II	1–1 (3–4 SO)	New York Red Bulls II	Foxborough, Massachusetts
7:00 PM EDT	Quiñones (yellow card) 35'; Adebayo-Smith 62'; Ítalo (yellow card) 80'	Report	Berkley (yellow card) 49'; Ssebufu (yellow card) 72'; Mullings 90+5'	Stadium: Gillette Stadium; Referee: Nabil Bensalah

August 9, 2023 22	Orlando City B	4–5	New England Revolution II	Kissimmee, Florida
6:00 PM EDT	Schlegel 13'; Salim 35' (o.g.); Martins (yellow card) 38'; Solís 44', (red card) 45+4'; Loyola 68'; Kibunguchy 74'	Report	Escobar (yellow card) 15'; Miller 25', (yellow card) 61'; Panayotou 45+2'; Adebayo-Smith 49'; Bolma (penalty scored) 53'; Leal (yellow card) 86'	Stadium: Osceola County Stadium; Referee: Alyssa Nichols

August 13, 2023 23	New England Revolution II	5–1	Atlanta United 2	Foxborough, Massachusetts
7:00 PM EDT	Rivera 8', (yellow card) 88'; Bajraktarevic (yellow card) 45+2', (goal) 80'; Rozhansky (yellow card) 54'; Adebayo-Smith 67', 90'; Okello 90+4'	Report	Conway 19', (yellow card) 90'; Gloster (yellow card) 40'; Tmimi (yellow card) 70'; Sanchez (yellow card) 90+3'	Stadium: Gillette Stadium; Referee: Adam Mitchell

August 18, 2023 24	Toronto FC II	0–0 (1–4 SO)	New England Revolution II	Toronto, Ontario
7:00 PM EDT		Report	Souza (yellow card) 64'	Stadium: York Lions Stadium; Referee: Mazen Hassanin

August 27, 2023 25	Philadelphia Union II	0–3	New England Revolution II	Chester, Pennsylvania
6:30 PM EDT	Donovan (yellow card) 43'	Report	Bolma 40'; Panayotou (yellow card) 46'; Dias 54', 86'	Stadium: Subaru Park; Referee: John Griggs

September 1, 2023 26	New England Revolution II	3–0	Huntsville City FC	Foxborough, Massachusetts
7:00 PM EDT	Fry 8', (yellow card) 27'; Suarez (yellow card) 51'; Panayotou (penalty scored) 71'; Escobar (yellow card) 80'; Leal (yellow card) 90+2'	Report	Johnston (yellow card) 3' (yellow-red card) , 41'; Wright (yellow card) 31'; Cicéron 47' (o.g.)	Stadium: Gillette Stadium; Referee: Ernie Constantine

September 7, 2023 27	New England Revolution II	1–1 (3–2 SO)	Orlando City B	Foxborough, Massachusetts
7:00 PM EDT	Souza 14'; Okello (yellow card) 45+1'; Suárez (yellow card) 52'; Leal (yellow card) 74'; Rozhansky (yellow card) 76'	Report	Salim (yellow card) 37'; Juninho (yellow card) 41'; Kibunguchy (yellow card) 48'; Lynn 65'	Stadium: Gillette Stadium; Referee: José Carlos Rivero

September 17, 2023 28	Crown Legacy FC	1–0	New England Revolution II	Matthews, North Carolina
5:00 PM EDT	Petkovic (yellow card) 26'; N. Berchimas 42'; Scardina (yellow card) 53'; Boardman (yellow card) 86'	Report	Adebayo-Smith (yellow card) 48'; Miller (yellow card) 67'	Stadium: Sportsplex at Matthews; Referee: Elijio Arreguin

=== Playoffs ===
==== Match results ====
October 1, 2023 First Round	New England Revolution II	3–2	Philadelphia Union II	Foxborough, Massachusetts
8:00 PM EDT	Dias (penalty scored) 26'; Bajraktarevic 55', 64'	Report	Castillo 78', (yellow card) 90+4'; Diallo (penalty scored) 82'	Stadium: Gillette Stadium; Referee: Gerald Flores

October 6, 2023 Conference Semifinal	New England Revolution II	2–1	New York Red Bulls II	Foxborough, Massachusetts
7:00 PM EDT	Fry 12', (yellow card) 27'; Cayet (yellow card) 35'; Rozhansky (yellow card) 56'; Souza 69'	Report	Berkley (yellow card) 41'; Valencia (yellow card) 68'; Hall 72'; Nocita (yellow card) 80'	Stadium: Gillette Stadium; Referee: Abdou Ndiaye

October 14, 2023 Conference Final	New England Revolution II	0–1	Columbus Crew 2	Foxborough, Massachusetts
5:00 PM EDT	Souza (yellow card) 90+3'	Report	Habroune (yellow card) 12'; Rayo (yellow card) 87', (goal) 90+1'	Stadium: Gillette Stadium; Referee: Matthew Thompson

== Statistics ==
=== Top scorers ===
Rank	Position	No.	Name	MLSNP
1	FW	99	(United States) Jordan Adebayo-Smith	12
2	FW	39	(Brazil) Marcos Dias	8
3	MF	72	(Costa Rica) Damian Rivera	6
3	MF	10	(United States) Esmir Bajraktarevic	6
5	MF	22	(United States) Jack Panayotou	5
6	FW	89	(United States) Malcolm Fry	4
7	MF	76	(United States) Peyton Miller	3
8	DF	44	(France) Pierre Cayet	2
8	MF	16	(Ghana) Joshua Bolma	2
10	MF	32	(United States) Jake Rozhansky	1
10	MF	33	(United States) Brandonn Bueno	1
10	MF	40	(Ghana) Ben Awashie	1
10	MF	65	(Canada) Noble Okello	1
10	DF	37	(United States) Victor Souza	1
15			own goal	4
Total				57

- Source: Team Stats

== See also ==
- 2023 New England Revolution season
