= Ismaila Soro =

Ivorian footballer

Personal information
- Full name: Ismaila Wafougossani Soro
- Date of birth: 7 May 1998 (age 28)
- Place of birth: Yakassé-Mé, Ivory Coast
- Height: 1.73 m (5 ft 8 in)
- Position: Defensive midfielder

Youth career
- 2015–2016: Moossou

Senior career*
Years	Team	Apps	(Gls)
2016–2017	Saxan	22	(0)
2017	Gomel	15	(1)
2018–2020	Bnei Yehuda	53	(0)
2020–2023	Celtic	27	(1)
2022–2023	→ Arouca (loan)	26	(0)
2023–2025	Beitar Jerusalem	55	(3)
2025–2026	Al-Riyadh	17	(0)
2026	Sakaryaspor	7	(0)

International career^{‡}
2021	Ivory Coast	1	(0)
- * Club domestic league appearances and goals as of 8 November 2026 ‡ National team caps and goals as of 12 June 2021

Ismaila Wafougossani Soro (born 7 May 1998) is an Ivorian professional footballer who plays as a defensive midfielder.

== Club career ==
=== Celtic ===
On 27 January 2020, Soro signed a four-and-a-half-year deal with Celtic. He joined the Scottish champions after representing Bnei Yehuda in the Israeli Premier League since 2018. He scored his first and only goal for Celtic in a 3–0 win over Dundee United on 30 December 2020.

=== Beitar Jerusalem ===
On 1 September 2023, Soro joined Israeli Premier League club Beitar Jerusalem on a two-year contract.

=== Al-Riyadh ===
On 18 August 2025, Soro joined Al-Riyadh on a free transfer.

== International career ==
Soro made his debut for Ivory Coast national team on 11 June 2021 in a friendly against Ghana.

== Career statistics ==
As of match played 1 June 2024

Appearances and goals by club, season and competition
Club	Season	League			Cup		Europe		Other		Total	
Club	Season	Division	Apps	Goals	Apps	Goals	Apps	Goals	Apps	Goals	Apps	Goals
Saxan	2016–17	Moldovan National Division	22	0	1	0	0	0	0	0	23	0
Gomel	2017	Belarusian Premier League	15	1	2	0	0	0	0	0	17	1
Bnei Yehuda	2017–18	Israeli Premier League	5	0	0	0	0	0	0	0	5	0
Bnei Yehuda	2018–19	Israeli Premier League	31	0	4	0	0	0	5	0	40	0
Bnei Yehuda	2019–20	Israeli Premier League	17	0	2	0	4	0	1	0	24	0
Bnei Yehuda	Total		53	0	6	0	4	0	6	0	69	0
Celtic	2019–20	Scottish Premiership	0	0	1	0	0	0	0	0	1	0
Celtic	2020–21	Scottish Premiership	19	1	1	0	3 (Note: Appearances in the Europa League)	0	0	0	23	1
Celtic	2021–22	Scottish Premiership	8	0	0	0	8	0	3 (Note: Appearances in the Scottish League Cup)	0	19	0
Celtic	Total		27	1	2	0	11	0	3	0	43	1
Arouca	2022–23	Primeira Liga	25	0	1	0	0	0	3 (Note: Appearances in the Taça da Liga)	0	29	0
Beitar Jerusalem	2023–24	Israeli Premier League	31	2	1	0	0	0	0	0	32	2
Beitar Jerusalem	2024–25	Israeli Premier League	0	0	0	0	0	0	0	0	0	0
Beitar Jerusalem	Total		31	2	1	0	0	0	0	0	32	2
Career total			173	4	13	0	15	0	12	0	213	4

== Honours ==
Bnei Yehuda

- Israel State Cup: 2018–19

Celtic

- Scottish Premiership: 2021–22
- Scottish Cup: 2019–20
