= Gil Cohen (footballer) =

Israeli association footballer (born 2000)

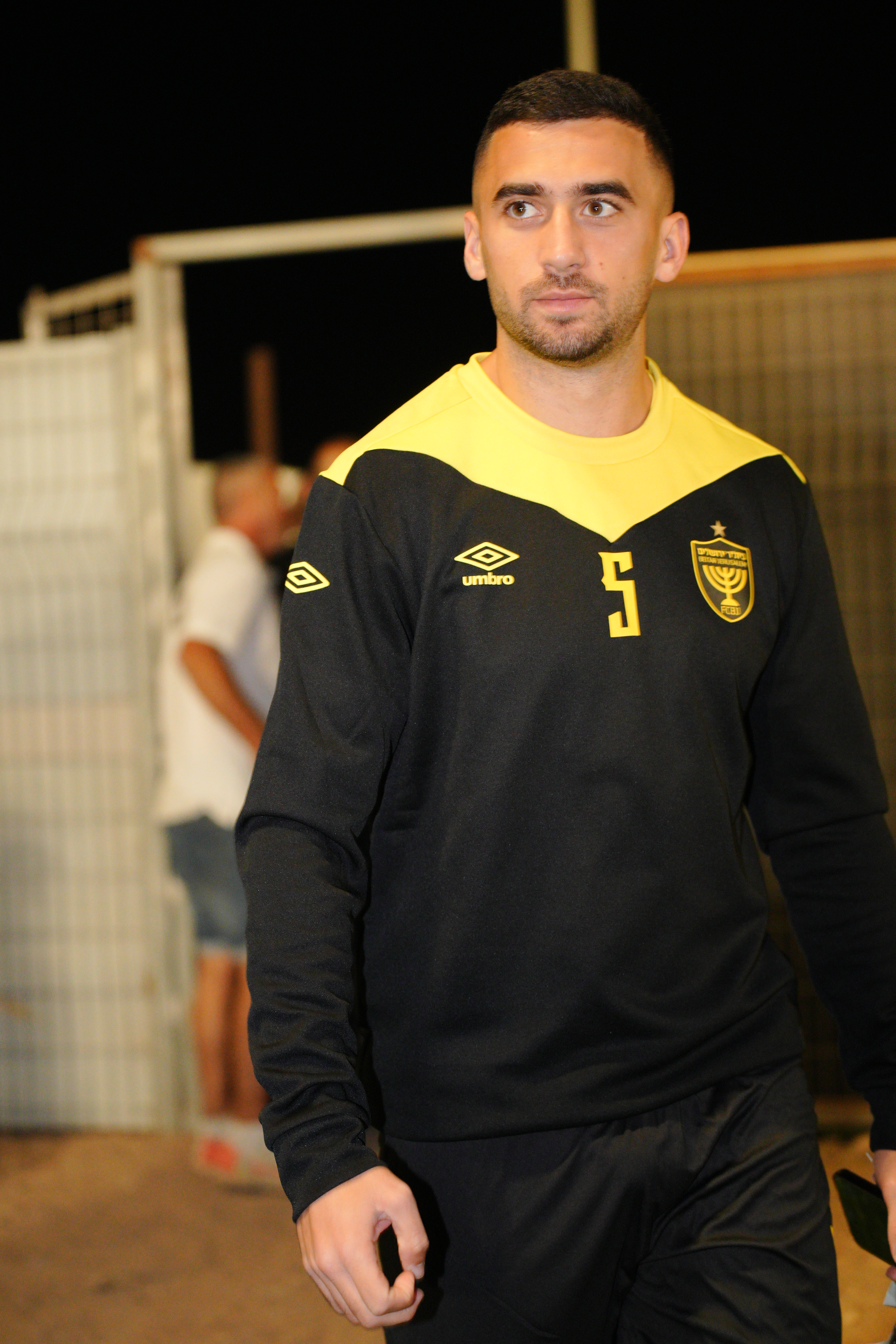

Personal information
- Date of birth: 8 November 2000 (age 26)
- Place of birth: Ashdod, Israel
- Height: 1.80 m (5 ft 11 in)
- Positions: Center-back; full-back

Team information
- Current team: Beitar Jerusalem
- Number: 5

Youth career
- F.C. Ashdod

Senior career*
Years	Team	Apps	(Gls)
2018–2024	F.C. Ashdod	140	(0)
2024–	Beitar Jerusalem	43	(3)

International career
2016	Israel U-16	2	(0)
2016–2017	Israel U-17	5	(0)
2017	Israel U-18	2	(0)
2018–2019	Israel U-19	9	(0)
2019–2023	Israel U-21	26	(0)
- * Club domestic league appearances and goals as of 23 June 2026

Gil Cohen (Hebrew: גיל כהן; born 8 November 2000) is an Israeli professional footballer who plays as a center-back or as a full-back for Israeli Premier League club Beitar Jerusalem.

== Early life ==
Cohen was born and raised in Ashdod, Israel, to an Israeli family of Sephardi Jewish descent.

He also holds Portuguese passport, on account of his Sephardi Jewish ancestors, which eases the move to certain European football leagues.

== See also ==
- List of Jewish footballers
- List of Jews in sports
- List of Israelis
