= Yarden Shua =

Israeli footballer

- Shua for Beitar Jerusalem in 2026

Personal information
- Date of birth: 16 June 1999 (age 27)
- Place of birth: Tel Aviv, Israel
- Height: 1.86 m (6 ft 1 in)
- Positions: Winger; attacking midfielder

Team information
- Current team: Beitar Jerusalem
- Number: 7

Youth career
- 2007–2011: Gadna Tel Aviv Yehuda
- 2011–2016: Maccabi Tel Aviv
- 2014–2015: → Hapoel Tel Aviv (loan)
- 2016–2018: Bnei Yehuda Tel Aviv

Senior career*
Years	Team	Apps	(Gls)
2016–2019	Bnei Yehuda Tel Aviv	27	(10)
2019–2020	Maccabi Haifa	37	(5)
2020–	Beitar Jerusalem	185	(50)

International career^{‡}
2015	Israel U16	3	(0)
2015	Israel U17	5	(0)
2017	Israel U18	1	(0)
2017	Israel U19	8	(4)
2024–	Israel	5	(2)
- * Club domestic league appearances and goals as of 23 June 2026 ‡ National team caps and goals as of 20:43, 14 October 2025 (UTC)

Yarden Shua (Hebrew: ירדן שועה; born 16 June 1999) is an Israeli professional footballer who plays as a winger or as an attacking midfielder for the Israeli Premier League club Beitar Jerusalem and the Israel national team.

== Early life ==
Shua was born and raised in Tel Aviv, Israel, to an Israeli family of Jewish descent.

== International career ==
Shua made his international debut for Israel on 17 November 2024 during a 2024–25 UEFA Nations League A game against Belgium coming on as a substitute for Dor Peretz at the 73rd minute. Fourteen minutes later, in the 87th, he scored a goal, enabling Israel to win 1–0, though Israel were unable to avoid relegation due to inferior goal difference with the Belgians.

== Career statistics ==
List of international goals scored by Yarden Shua
No.	Date	Venue	Cap	Opponent	Score	Result	Competition
1	17 November 2024	Bozsik Aréna, Budapest, Hungary	1	Belgium	1–0	1–0	2024–25 UEFA Nations League A
2	10 June 2025	Nagyerdei Stadion, Debrecen, Hungary	3	Slovakia	1–0	1–0	Friendly

== Honours ==
Bnei Yehuda Tel Aviv

- Israel State Cup: 2018–19

Beitar Jerusalem

- Israel State Cup: 2022–2023

Individual

- Israeli Premier League most assists: 2022–23, 2023–24

== See also ==
- List of Jewish footballers
- List of Jews in sports
- List of Israelis
- List of Israel international footballers
