= Nehoray Dabush =

Israeli footballer

Nehoray Dabush נהוראי דבוש
Personal information
- Full name: Nehoray Dabush
- Date of birth: 18 October 2004 (age 22)
- Place of birth: Modi'in-Maccabim-Re'ut, Israel
- Positions: Centre-forward; winger

Team information
- Current team: Ashdod
- Number: 12

Youth career
- 2012–2016: Ironi Modi'in
- 2016–2018: Maccabi Tel Aviv
- 2018–2023: Beitar Jerusalem

Senior career*
Years	Team	Apps	(Gls)
2023–2025	Beitar Jerusalem	29	(2)
2025–	F.C. Ashdod	28	(8)
- * Club domestic league appearances and goals as of 24 September 2026

Nehoray Dabush (Hebrew: נהוראי דבוש; born 18 October 2004) is an Israeli professional footballer who plays as a centre-forward.

== Career ==
On 13 August 2022 made his senior debut in the 1–2 loss to Hapoel Tel Aviv in the Toto Cup competition. On 4 February 2023 made his Israeli Premier League debut in the 3–0 win against Ironi Kiryat Shmona. On 17 February 2024 scored his debut goal in the 1–2 loss to Bnei Sakhinn.
