= Hapoel Jerusalem F.C. =

Association football club in Israel

Hapoel Jerusalem
- Full name: Hapoel Jerusalem Football Club מועדון כדורגל הפועל ירושלים
- Nickname: Katamon
- Founded: 1926
- Ground: Teddy Stadium, Jerusalem
- Capacity: 31,733
- Owners: Fan-owned
- Chairman: Yotam Karmon (Chairman), Uri Sheradsky (CEO)
- Manager: Lior Zada
- League: Israeli Premier League
- 2025–26: Israeli Premier League, 12th of 14
- Website: hapoeljerusalem.co.il
Home colours	Away colours

Hapoel Jerusalem Football Club (Hebrew: מועדון כדורגל הפועל ירושלים, Mo'adon Kaduregel Hapoel Yerushalayim) is an Israeli professional football club based in Jerusalem. It competes in the Israeli Premier League, the top flight of Israeli football. Founded in 1926, their home ground is the Teddy Stadium. As a protest against the conduct of the club's owners since the 1990s, the Hapoel Katamon Jerusalem football club was established in 2007, the first football club in Israel owned by its fans. The club was named after Katamon Stadium, which was formerly used by Hapoel Jerusalem. The club existed in parallel with Hapoel Jerusalem for 12 years.

In 2019 Hapoel Jerusalem was disbanded and in August 2020, Hapoel Katamon acquired the rights to the name Hapoel Jerusalem and officially became Hapoel Jerusalem. Since then, the club is owned by its fans and is managed by a board of seven members.

The team's record achievement is winning the State Cup and third place in the First League in 1973.

== History ==
A chart showing the progress of Hapoel Jerusalem through the Israeli football league system, from 1931–32 to the present

Old logo

Old logo 2

Hapoel Jerusalem Club was established in 1926 and played in the inaugural season of the EIFA league, playing the league's first match against local rivals Maccabi Hasmonean Jerusalem. The club played in the league for its first three seasons, however, the club was restricted to playing mainly in the Jerusalem area due to travelling difficulties. The club participated occasionally in the Palestine Cup, reaching the cup final in 1943, losing to a team from the Royal Artillery 1–7.

After the establishment of Israel, the club registered to play in the makeshift second-tier league, Liga Meuhedet, in the Jerusalem-Central division, which the club won. The club continued to play in the second division (Liga Bet until 1956 and Liga Alef afterwards), until it was promoted to the top division at the end of the 1956–57 season, after finishing second in promotion play-offs. Following the promotion, the club stayed in the top division for 21 seasons, achieving its best position, 3rd, in 1972–73. In 1971–72 the club reached the State Cup final, losing to Hapoel Tel Aviv 0–1. A season later, the club reached the cup final again, this time winning the cup.

The club was relegated to the second division in 1979, but bounced back the following season. The club continued to yo-yo between the two top divisions in the following seasons, playing his last season at the top division in 1999–2000. In 1998, the club reached its fourth cup final, but lost to Maccabi Haifa in extra time.

In the early 1990s, the club was transferred to businessmen Yossi Sassi and Victor Yona. The two ran the team together until falling out, leading to a long business and legal dispute which lasted until 2009, when Yona left the club. During the dispute, a group of supporters, tired of the feuding between the two businessmen, decided to establish a group, first in an attempt to purchase control of the club, and then in a bid to establish a fan-owned club, Hapoel Katamon Jerusalem. The fan-based club was established in 2009 (after a short period of existence as a merged club with Hapoel Mevaseret Zion) and progressed to the Liga Leumit in 2013–14, where the two clubs met for the first time.

The club played in the third tier Liga Aleph after being relegated from the second tier Liga Leumit in the 2016–17. On 26 August 2019 the Israeli Football Federation refused to list the club for 2019–20 season due to financial problems.

On 9 August 2020, the club has been officially recreated, as Hapoel Katamon renamed to Hapoel Jerusalem.

On 30 April 2021, Hapoel Jerusalem won against Sektzia Nes Ziona, thereby securing promotion to the top flight, after an absence of 21 years from the top flight.

== Stadiums ==
Since the establishment of Israel, the club played in three stadiums, YMCA stadium, in which the club played between 1949 and 1955, when the club moved to its own Katamon Stadium, in the neighborhood of Katamon. Katamon Stadium was razed in 1982, with the intention to build a bigger modern stadium in its place, and in the meantime the club returned to play in YMCA stadium. The new stadium in Katamon was never built, and instead Teddy Stadium was built in the Malha neighborhood, to which the club moved in 1992.

== Support ==
During the early years, support of the club came mostly from the labour organizations in Israel. City rivals Beitar were identified with the right-wing nationalist organizations. All this played out to create the Jerusalem derby. To this day the rivalry exists, though it is not nearly as heated as when both clubs played in the top division of Israeli football. In 2007 a large majority of fans, unhappy with the management of the club, defected and founded Hapoel Katamon Jerusalem F.C., the first fully fan-owned club in the country.

== Current squad ==
As of 25 August 2026

No.	Pos.	Nation	Player
1	GK	ISR	Ben Gordin (on loan from Hapoel Be'er Sheva)
3	DF	ISR	Noam Malmoud
4	DF	ISR	Yonathan Laish
8	MF	ISR	Ilay Madmon
10	FW	MDA	Vitalie Damascan
11	MF	ISR	Yanai Distelfeld
13	GK	USA	Guy Bar
14	MF	ISR	Omer Abuhav
16	DF	ISR	Omer Agvadish
17	FW	NGR	Sani Abdulsalam
18	DF	ISR	Li On Mizrahi
20	DF	ISR	Ofek Nadir
21	MF	ISR	Ayano Preda

No.	Pos.	Nation	Player
22	DF	ISR	Tamir Haimovich
23	MF	ISR	Netanel Shiferaw
25	FW	NGR	Andrew Idoko
26	DF	ISR	Idan Cohen
27	FW	ISR	Mohamed Diab
33	FW	ISR	Israel Dappa
55	GK	ISR	Nadav Zamir
70	DF	TOG	Zuberu Sharani
77	FW	ISR	Ohad Almagor
91	MF	CIV	Christ Tiéhi
95	GK	ISR	Ilay Tovim
—	MF	ZAM	Edward Chilufya (on loan from Midtjylland)

=== Other players under contract ===
No.	Pos.	Nation	Player
40	MF	CIV	Daniel Koudougou

=== Out on loan ===
No.	Pos.	Nation	Player

== Coaching staff ==
As of May 24, 2019

Position	Staff
Manager	(Israel) Ziv Arie
Assistant manager	(Israel) Lior Zada (Israel) Yitzhak Sherman
First-team coach	(Israel) Yitzhak Sherman
Goalkeeper coach	(Israel) Guy Hakmon
Fitness coach	(Israel) Lidor Ganon
Sportstherapist	(Israel) Shlomi Zimmermann
Physiotherapist	(Israel) Itay Azulay
Director of the youth department	(Israel) Yehuda Herzog
Logistics Manager	(Israel) Moshe Zakaria
Professional Manager	(Israel) Shay Aharon

== Honours ==
=== League ===
Honour	No.	Years
Second tier	3	1949–50, 1979–80, 1987–88
Third tier	3	2001–02, 2007–08, 2010–11

=== Cups ===
Honour	No.	Years
State Cup	1	1973

=== Other titles ===
Honour	No.	Years
Raghib al-Nashashibi Cup	1	1929

== See also ==
- Hapoel Katamon Jerusalem
