= 2018–19 Liga Leumit =

Liga Leumit
- Season: 2018–19
- Champions: Hapoel Kfar Saba
- Promoted: Hapoel Kfar Saba; Sektzia Ness Ziona
- Relegated: Hapoel Marmorek; Hapoel Iksal
- Matches played: 288
- Goals scored: 702 (2.44 per match)

The 2018–19 Liga Leumit was the 20th season as second tier since its re-alignment in 1999 and the 77th season of second-tier football in Israel.

A total of sixteen teams contested in the league, including twelve sides from the 2017–18 season, the two promoted teams from 2017–18 Liga Alef and the two relegated teams from 2017–18 Israeli Premier League.

== Changes from 2017–18 season ==
=== Team changes ===
Hapoel Tel Aviv and Hapoel Hadera were promoted to the 2018–19 Israeli Premier League.

Hapoel Ashkelon and Hapoel Acre were relegated after finishing as the two bottom-placed clubs in the 2017–18 Israeli Premier League.

Maccabi Herzliya, and Ironi Nesher were directly relegated to Liga Alef after finishing in the previous season in last two league places. They were replaced the top placed teams from each division of 2017–18 Liga Alef, Sektzia Ness Ziona (from South Division) and Hapoel Iksal (from North Division).

== Overview ==
=== Stadia and locations ===
2018–19 Liga Leumit (Israel)

Club	Home City	Stadium	Capacity
Beitar Tel Aviv Ramla	Tel Aviv and Ramla	Ramla Municipal Stadium	2,000
Hapoel Acre	Acre	Acre Municipal Stadium	5,000
Hapoel Afula	Afula	Afula Illit Stadium	3,000
Hapoel Ashkelon	Ashkelon	Sala Stadium	5,250
Hapoel Bnei Lod	Lod	Lod Municipal Stadium	3,000
Hapoel Iksal	Iksal	Ilut Stadium^{[A]}	4,932
Hapoel Katamon Jerusalem	Jerusalem	Teddy Stadium	31,733
Hapoel Kfar Saba	Kfar Saba	Levita Stadium	5,800
Hapoel Marmorek	Rehovot	Ramla Municipal Stadium^{[A]}	2,000
Hapoel Nazareth Illit	Nazareth Illit	Green Stadium	4,000
Hapoel Petah Tikva	Petah Tikva	HaMoshava Stadium	11,500
Hapoel Ramat Gan	Ramat Gan	Ramat Gan Stadium	13,370
Hapoel Ramat HaSharon	Ramat HaSharon	Grundman Stadium	4,300
Hapoel Rishon LeZion	Rishon LeZion	Haberfeld Stadium	6,000
Maccabi Ahi Nazareth	Nazareth	Ilut Stadium	4,932
Sektzia Ness Ziona	Ness Ziona	Ness Ziona Stadium	3,500

^A The club is playing their home games at a neutral venue because their own ground does not meet league requirements.

== Regular season ==
Pos	Team	Pld	W	D	L	GF	GA	GD	Pts	Qualification
1	Hapoel Nazareth Illit	30	14	12	4	42	25	+17	54	Qualification for the Promotion playoffs
2	Hapoel Katamon Jerusalem	30	13	9	8	40	33	+7	48	Qualification for the Promotion playoffs
3	Sektzia Ness Ziona	30	14	5	11	48	35	+13	47	Qualification for the Promotion playoffs
4	Hapoel Afula	30	12	11	7	38	28	+10	47	Qualification for the Promotion playoffs
5	Hapoel Kfar Saba	30	12	8	10	41	35	+6	44	Qualification for the Promotion playoffs
6	Hapoel Ashkelon	30	11	11	8	34	35	−1	44	Qualification for the Promotion playoffs
7	Beitar Tel Aviv Ramla	30	12	7	11	40	37	+3	43	Qualification for the Promotion playoffs
8	Hapoel Ramat Gan	30	9	12	9	35	35	0	39	Qualification for the Promotion playoffs
9	Maccabi Ahi Nazareth	30	10	9	11	33	38	−5	39	Qualification for the Relegation playoffs
10	Hapoel Acre	30	7	14	9	27	31	−4	35	Qualification for the Relegation playoffs
11	Hapoel Petah Tikva	30	12	10	8	39	30	+9	34 (Note: Hapoel Petah Tikva had twelve points deducted for financial offences and failing to pay players wages between March and June 2018.)	Qualification for the Relegation playoffs
12	Hapoel Rishon LeZion	30	8	10	12	34	43	−9	34	Qualification for the Relegation playoffs
13	Hapoel Marmorek	30	9	6	15	29	47	−18	33	Qualification for the Relegation playoffs
14	Hapoel Bnei Lod	30	8	8	14	31	40	−9	32	Qualification for the Relegation playoffs
15	Hapoel Ramat HaSharon	30	7	10	13	32	38	−6	31	Qualification for the Relegation playoffs
16	Hapoel Iksal	30	7	8	15	31	44	−13	29	Qualification for the Relegation playoffs

Source: https://www.scorespro.com/soccer/israel/liga-leumit/standings/
Rules for classification: 1) points; 2) goal difference; 3) number of wins; 4) goals scored; 5) head to head; 6) deciding match.

== Results ==
=== Matches 1–30 ===
Home \ Away	TAR	HAC	HAF	HAS	HBL	HIX	HKJ	HKS	HMR	HNI	HPT	HRG	HRS	HRL	MAN	SNZ
Beitar Tel Aviv Ramla	—	2–2	3–1	2–0	1–3	2–0	2–0	0–0	2–0	1–3	0–0	1–0	2–2	1–1	3–0	2–0
Hapoel Acre	0–0	—	0–0	0–2	2–0	3–1	0–3	0–1	5–1	0–0	1–2	1–1	0–0	0–0	1–1	2–2
Hapoel Afula	2–0	1–0	—	4–1	1–0	1–0	1–1	1–1	3–0	2–4	1–2	1–1	1–0	2–1	4–0	3–1
Hapoel Ashkelon	1–3	1–1	1–1	—	1–0	2–1	2–0	2–1	4–2	0–1	2–2	2–4	2–1	1–0	0–0	2–2
Hapoel Bnei Lod	3–0	0–1	1–1	0–0	—	0–0	2–0	0–3	0–1	1–2	0–2	0–2	0–1	5–2	1–2	1–0
Hapoel Iksal	4–1	1–0	2–0	2–0	1–1	—	1–1	2–2	1–0	1–3	0–0	0–1	1–3	1–2	0–1	2–1
Hapoel Katamon Jerusalem	1–0	0–0	1–0	2–0	3–3	1–3	—	1–2	0–3	2–2	1–0	0–0	3–0	1–1	3–1	1–0
Hapoel Kfar Saba	3–2	0–2	1–1	0–2	1–1	2–2	0–1	—	3–1	0–0	2–1	2–0	2–0	1–1	2–3	1–5
Hapoel Marmorek	3–1	0–0	0–1	0–1	0–2	4–2	2–2	0–4	—	1–2	2–1	0–2	2–0	1–1	1–1	0–0
Hapoel Nazareth Illit	2–1	0–0	2–0	0–0	1–2	1–0	1–1	1–1	0–1	—	3–1	1–1	0–0	4–1	0–0	1–0
Hapoel Petah Tikva	1–1	1–2	1–1	1–1	2–2	1–0	2–1	2–0	3–0	2–0	—	1–0	2–2	2–0	1–2	0–1
Hapoel Ramat Gan	1–2	0–2	1–1	1–1	0–0	2–2	0–1	2–1	0–0	1–2	2–1	—	1–1	0–0	2–1	2–4
Hapoel Ramat HaSharon	1–2	1–1	0–1	0–0	0–1	2–2	3–1	1–2	3–0	1–1	2–1	1–2	—	1–1	2–0	1–2
Hapoel Rishon LeZion	1–0	3–1	1–1	0–1	4–1	4–1	1–4	1–0	2–0	0–2	2–2	1–1	1–2	—	0–2	0–1
Maccabi Ahi Nazareth	0–2	1–0	1–1	3–1	3–0	0–0	0–1	0–1	0–2	2–2	0–0	3–4	3–1	0–1	—	2–2
Sektzia Ness Ziona	2–1	6–0	0–1	1–1	3–1	2–0	1–3	2–1	1–2	2–1	0–1	2–1	0–1	4–1	0–1	—

Source: Liga Leumit IFA
Legend: Blue = home team win; Red = away team win.

== Playoffs ==
=== Promotion playoff ===
==== Top Playoff table ====
Pos	Team	Pld	W	D	L	GF	GA	GD	Pts	Promotion
1	Hapoel Kfar Saba (P)	37	18	9	10	53	38	+15	63	Promoted to Israeli Premier League
2	Sektzia Ness Ziona (P)	37	18	8	11	57	38	+19	62	Promoted to Israeli Premier League
3	Hapoel Nazareth Illit	37	15	16	6	48	32	+16	61	
4	Hapoel Katamon Jerusalem	37	15	11	11	44	42	+2	56	
5	Hapoel Afula	37	14	13	10	43	36	+7	55	
6	Hapoel Ashkelon	37	14	12	11	46	47	−1	54	
7	Beitar Tel Aviv Ramla	37	14	8	15	47	44	+3	50	
8	Hapoel Ramat Gan	37	9	14	14	38	44	−6	41	

Rules for classification: 1) points; 2) goal difference; 3) number of wins; 4) goals scored; 5) head to head; 6)deciding match.
(P) Promoted

==== Top Playoff results ====
Home \ Away	TAR	HAF	HAS	HKJ	HKS	HNI	HRG	SNZ
Beitar Tel Aviv Ramla	—	—	—	—	—		2–1	1–2
Hapoel Afula	2–1	—	—	0–0		—	2–0	—
Hapoel Ashkelon	0–3	2–0	—		—	—	—	—
Hapoel Katamon Jerusalem	0–0	—	—	—	0–3	—	1–0	0–1
Hapoel Kfar Saba	1–0	—	3–1	—	—	—	1–0	—
Hapoel Nazareth Illit	—	0–0	2–2	1–2	0–1	—	—	—
Hapoel Ramat Gan	—	—	1–3	—	—	1–1	—	
Sektzia Ness Ziona	—	2–0	2–0	—	0–0	1–1	—	—

Legend: Blue = home team win; Yellow = draw; Red = away team win.

=== Relegation playoff ===
==== Bottom Playoff table ====
Pos	Team	Pld	W	D	L	GF	GA	GD	Pts	Relegation
9	Hapoel Bnei Lod	37	12	11	14	45	48	−3	47	
10	Hapoel Petah Tikva	37	15	13	9	50	36	+14	46 (Note: Hapoel Petah Tikva had twelve points deducted for financial offences and failing to pay players wages between March and June 2018.)	
11	Maccabi Ahi Nazareth	37	12	10	15	43	49	−6	46	
12	Hapoel Rishon LeZion	37	11	13	13	40	49	−9	46	
13	Hapoel Ramat HaSharon	37	11	12	14	41	42	−1	45	
14	Hapoel Acre (O)	37	10	15	12	37	38	−1	45	Qualification for the Relegation Playoffs
15	Hapoel Marmorek (R)	37	10	7	20	35	58	−23	37	Relegated to Liga Alef
16	Hapoel Iksal (R)	37	7	10	20	35	61	−26	31	Relegated to Liga Alef

Rules for classification: 1) points; 2) goal difference; 3) number of wins; 4) goals scored; 5) head to head; 6)deciding match.
(O) Play-off winners; (R) Relegated

==== Bottom Playoff results ====
Home \ Away	HAC	HBL	HIX	HMR	HPT	HRS	HRL	MAN
Hapoel Acre	—	—	4–0	2–1	2–0	0–2	—	—
Hapoel Bnei Lod	2–2	—	—	—	—	2–1	4–1	—
Hapoel Iksal	—	0–0	—	—	2–5	—	—	1–3
Hapoel Marmorek	—	1–2	2–0	—	—	1–2	—	—
Hapoel Petah Tikva	—	0–0	—	3–0	—	—	0–0	3–2
Hapoel Ramat HaSharon	—	—	2–0	—	0–0	—	—	1–0
Hapoel Rishon LeZion	1–0	—	1–1	1–0	—	1–1	—	—
Maccabi Ahi Nazareth	1–0	3–4	—	1–1	—	—	0–1	—

Legend: Blue = home team win; Yellow = draw; Red = away team win.

== Positions by round ==
Team \ Round	1	2	3	4	5	6	7	8	9	10	11	12	13	14	15	16	17	18	19	20	21	22	23	24	25	26	27	28	29	30	31	32	33	34	35	36	37
Sektzia Ness Ziona	3	9	10	7	5	6	6	6	6	6	7	7	7	5	5	6	7	5	6	4	5	7	6	5	6	5	3	4	3	3	2	2	2	1	1	1	2
Hapoel Kfar Saba	5	2	2	3	1	1	2	2	2	2	3	2	2	1	2	1	1	1	1	2	2	3	2	3	2	3	2	3	5	5	5	5	3	3	3	2	1
Hapoel Nazareth Illit	5	8	5	6	4	4	3	3	3	5	4	3	4	4	4	3	2	2	2	1	1	1	1	1	1	1	1	1	1	1	1	1	1	2	2	3	3
Hapoel Katamon Jerusalem	2	1	1	1	2	2	1	1	1	1	1	1	1	2	1	2	3	3	3	3	3	2	3	4	4	2	4	2	2	2	4	3	5	5	5	4	4
Hapoel Afula	5	5	3	2	3	3	5	4	4	3	5	5	5	6	7	7	6	7	7	5	6	5	4	2	3	6	6	5	4	4	3	4	4	4	4	5	5
Hapoel Ashkelon	1	5	7	5	7	5	4	5	5	4	2	4	3	3	3	4	5	6	5	6	7	4	5	6	5	4	5	6	6	6	6	6	6	6	7	6	6
Beitar Tel Aviv	14	10	6	9	11	8	8	7	7	10	6	6	6	7	6	5	4	4	4	7	4	6	7	7	7	7	7	7	7	7	7	7	7	7	6	7	7
Hapoel Ramat Gan	9	11	13	13	13	14	15	12	12	12	11	10	8	8	10	13	10	10	8	9	8	8	8	8	8	8	8	8	8	8	8	8	8	8	8	8	8
Hapoel Bnei Lod	15	15	15	15	14	12	13	15	14	14	14	14	14	14	14	14	14	14	14	15	15	15	15	15	15	15	14	15	15	15	13	11	12	11	10	9	9
Hapoel Petah Tikva	16	16	16	16	16	16	16	16	16	16	16	16	16	15	15	15	15	15	15	14	14	14	14	13	14	12	11	10	11	11	10	12	10	12	11	12	10
Maccabi Ahi Nazareth	3	4	8	8	8	9	7	10	10	11	13	11	12	13	12	12	13	12	13	13	13	12	12	12	11	11	13	11	9	9	9	9	9	9	9	10	11
Hapoel Rishon LeZion	9	13	12	11	10	11	10	9	9	9	9	9	9	9	8	8	8	11	12	8	10	10	10	10	10	9	10	12	12	12	12	15	15	14	12	13	12
Hapoel Ramat HaSharon	5	7	9	10	9	10	11	11	11	7	10	12	10	10	9	9	11	8	10	11	11	11	11	11	12	13	12	13	13	14	15	13	14	13	14	14	13
Hapoel Acre	9	3	4	4	6	7	9	8	8	8	8	8	11	12	11	10	9	9	9	10	9	9	9	9	9	10	9	9	10	10	11	14	11	10	13	11	14
Hapoel Marmorek	9	12	11	12	12	13	12	13	15	15	15	15	15	16	16	16	16	16	16	16	16	16	16	16	16	16	15	14	14	13	14	10	13	15	15	15	15
Hapoel Iksal	13	14	14	14	15	15	14	14	13	13	12	13	13	11	13	11	12	13	11	12	12	13	13	14	13	14	16	16	16	16	16	16	16	16	16	16	16

Source: IFA Source:

Leader and promotion to 2019–20 Israeli Premier League
Promotion to 2019–20 Israeli Premier League
Qualification to relegation play-offs
Relegation to 2019–20 Liga Alef

== Promotion/relegation playoff ==
The 14th-placed team, Hapoel Acre, faced 2018–19 Liga Alef promotion play-offs winner Maccabi Herzliya in a two-legged tie. The matches took place on 26 and 29 May 2019.

26 May 2019
20:15

Hapoel Acre	4 – 3	Maccabi Herzliya
Yuval Titelman 20'; Elior Seiderre (3) 43', 60', 74'		Shivhon 3'; Assaf Levi (2) 41', 84' (pen.)

Municipal Stadium, Acre
Referee: Ziv Adler

29 May 2019
19:00

Maccabi Herzliya	1 – 3	Hapoel Acre
Amir Lavi 30'		Naor Abudi (3) 45', 68', 90+4'

Municipal Stadium, Herzliya

Hapoel Acre won 7–4 on aggregate and remained in Liga Leumit. Maccabi Herzliya remained in Liga Alef.

== See also ==
- 2018–19 Toto Cup Leumit
