= US Youth Soccer National Championships =

American youth soccer cup competition

The US Youth Soccer National Championships consists of six age groups (Under 14, 15, 16, 17, 18 and 19). The finals are a result of competitions in every state known as the US Youth Soccer National Championship Series. Regional winners advance to the National Championships as well as the top two teams from the US Youth Soccer National League. The US Youth Soccer National League competition is for the nation's top teams in the Under-14, Under-15, Under-16, Under-17 and Under-18 boys and girls age groups, consisting of a total of 16 teams, split into two divisions, per gender age group. The top two teams from each of the two divisions in each gender age group advances to the US Youth Soccer National Championships.

== See also ==
- Gatorade High School Soccer Players of the Year
