= Ramla Municipal Stadium =

Football stadium in Ramla, Israel

Coordinates: 31°55′28.80″N 34°51′59.50″E

- Interactive map of Ramla Municipal Stadium
- Location: Ramla, Israel
- Owner: Municipality of Ramla
- Capacity: 2,000 (All-seater)
- Surface: Grass

Tenants
- Beitar Ramla (1951–1999); Ironi Ramla (1999–2011); Beitar Tel Aviv Ramla (2013–2019); Hapoel Marmorek (2017–2019); F.C. Ramla (2019–present); Maccabi Kabilio Jaffa (2020–present)

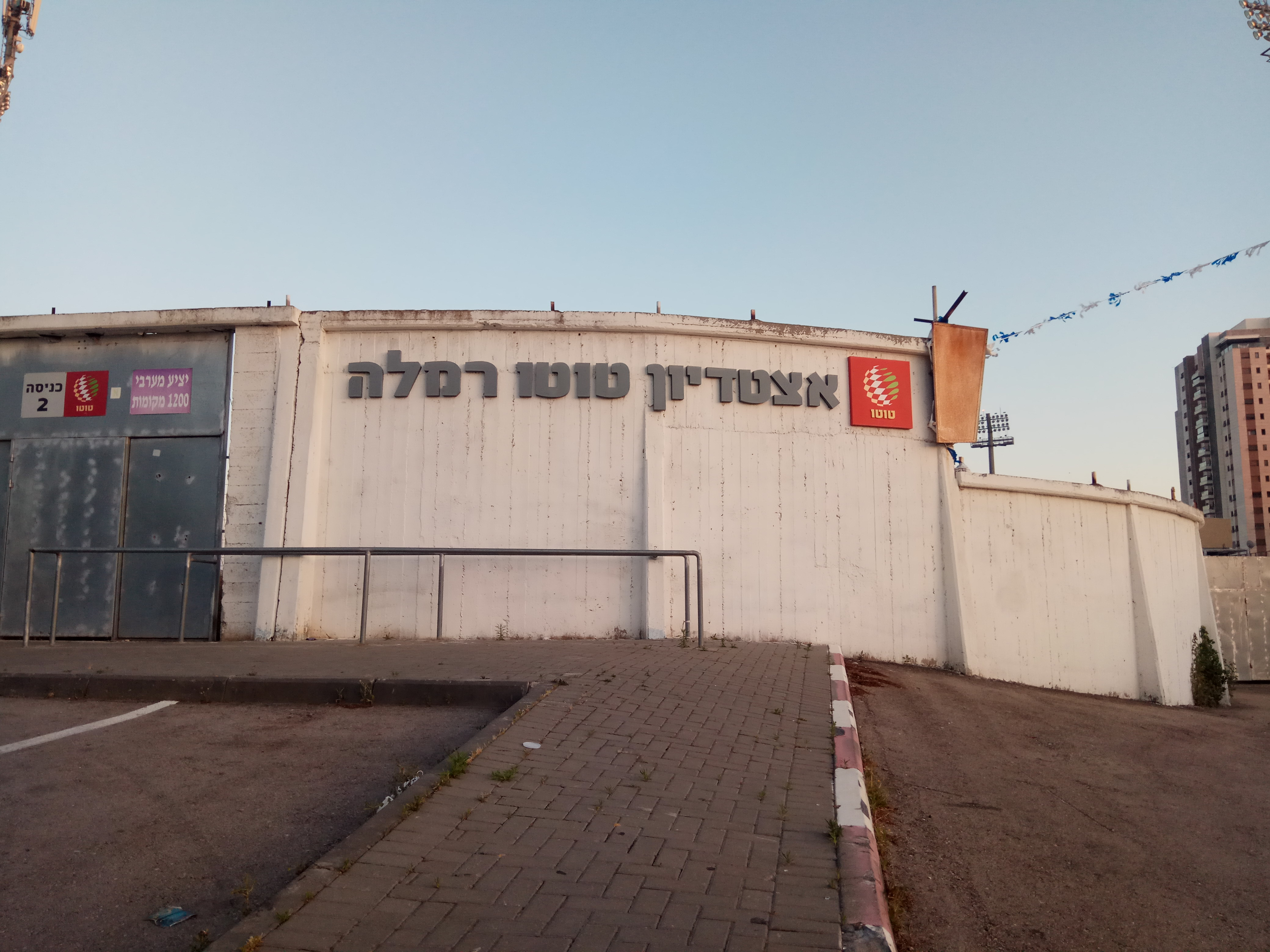
Toto Ramla

Ramla Municipal Stadium (Hebrew: אצטדיון עירוני רמלה, Itztadion Ironi Ramla), officially known as Toto Stadium Ramla, is a football stadium in Ramla, Israel.

The stadium was renovated ahead of the 2015 UEFA Women's Under-19 Championship, in which the stadium hosted 3 matches.
