= Hapoel Katamon Jerusalem F.C. =

Israeli former football club

Hapoel Katamon Jerusalem
- Full name: Hapoel Jerusalem Football Club
- Nicknames: The Red Devils, Hapoel
- Short name: HJFC
- Founded: 2007 (as Hapoel Katamon/Mevasseret Zion); 2009 (as Hapoel Katamon Jerusalem); 2020 (as Hapoel Jerusalem)
- Dissolved: 2020
| Home colours | Away colours | Third colours |

Hapoel Katamon Jerusalem F.C. (Hebrew: הפועל קטמון ירושלים) was an Israeli fan-owned association football club in Jerusalem. It was conceived and founded in 2007 by Hapoel Jerusalem fans unhappy with the club's management.

At its founding, Hapoel Katamon Jerusalem became the first fan-owned football club in Israel. In May 2020, the club's Council decided to rename the club to Hapoel Jerusalem, and changed the logo accordingly.

== History ==
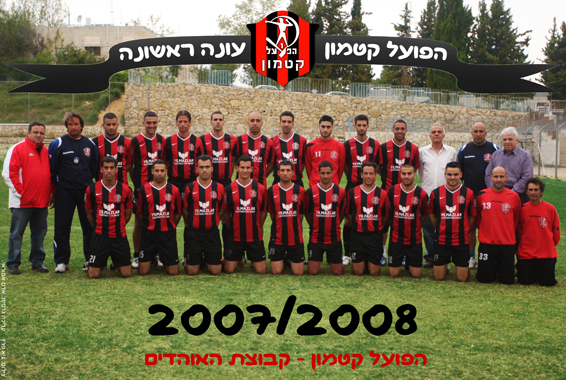
The first squad: 2007–08

After the 2006–07 season, in which the team dropped for the second time to the 3rd league, disenchanted fans, resolved to create a company with the aim of purchasing the club. The group, led by journalist Uri Sheradski and supported by future mayor Nir Barkat, bought Hapoel Mevasseret Zion/Abu Ghosh, and renamed it "Hapoel Katamon/Mevasseret Zion". The new name was taken from Katamon, a neighborhood of Jerusalem where Hapoel Jerusalem played from 1954 until moving to the YMCA Stadium and later on to the Teddy Stadium. The first game was played October 19, 2007, to a crowd of 3,000; Hapoel Katamon won against Hapoel Nahalat Yehuda by 2–1.

Not all of Hapoel Jerusalem fans supported this move; popular slogan among the critics was "love can't be bought for a 1,000 Shekels", a reference to the membership price. However, the number of spectators at Katamon matches has steadily outnumbered that of Hapoel Jerusalem. The first year was a relative professional success, as the team reached the 7th round of the Israel State Cup, and finished the league second, just one point short of advancing to the Liga Artzit. In the 2008–09 season, the team finished 7th. Efforts to merge between Hapoel Katamon and Hapoel Jerusalem resumed, but to no success. Eventually, it was decided by a vote of member-fans to end the cooperation with Hapoel Mevasseret, and instead establish a new club, owned and operated by Hapoel Katamon fans and supported by the municipality. The main disadvantage was that a newly created team must start out at Liga Gimel, the 5th division.

The new club, named "Hapoel Katamon Jerusalem", started playing in late September 2009 at the Hebrew University Stadium at Givat Ram, Jerusalem. The new management consisted of 3 representatives elected by the fans. Amir Gola, a team icon, returned from retirement to be captain of the new team. Hapoel Katamon had a steady lead, and it finished first in the league. The final home match was played to an estimated crowd of 4,000. For the 2009–10 season, the team reinforced with numerous players, most notably Shay Aharon, who was Hapoel Jerusalem's captain for several years, including the 2008–09 season. Throughout the 2009–10 season in Liga Bet, Hapoel Katamon had a steady lead, and it finished first in the league, advancing to Liga Alef. At that season, the club had also established a youth branch and some of the youth teams managed to advance a league for their first season.

At the end of the 2012–13 season, Hapoel Katamon succeeded to qualify for Liga Leumit, where they faced Hapoel Jerusalem. Hapoel Katamon finished the 2013–14 season in the 14th place, and had to play-off against relegation with Ironi Tiberias. Hapoel Katamon lost 1–5 on aggregate (0–3, 1–2). The team finished the 2014–15 season in the first place of Liga Alef's northern division, and returned to Liga Leumit. In the 2015–16 season, the club achieved its best placing to date, when they finished fourth in Liga Leumit. In the 2018–19 season, the club won the Toto Cup Leumit - becoming the first fan owned club to win a trophy in Israeli football. In May 2020, during the 2019–20 season, the club's council decided to rename as Hapoel Jerusalem, and changed the logo accordingly.

== Fans and social activity ==
Logo of the Social Initiative

Hapoel fans valued the ideal of representing its local community and not being owned by businessmen. Fans of the team have taken part in various social activities under "the Social Initiative". These included instructing students in various schools in Jerusalem, as well as teaching Hebrew to immigrants. The most successful was the "neighborhood league", in which elementary students represented their schools in football and received help with schoolwork. Families of fans make up a large part of membership owners.

== Honours ==
=== League ===
| Honour | No. | Years |
|---|---|---|
| Third tier | 2 | 2012–13, 2014–15 |
| Fourth tier | 1 | 2010–11 |
| Fifth tier | 1 | 2009–10 |

=== Cup ===
| Honour | No. | Years |
|---|---|---|
| Toto Cup Leumit | 1 | 2018–19 |

== See also ==
- Hapoel Jerusalem
