= 2020–21 Hapoel Haifa F.C. season =

Hapoel Haifa
2020–21 season
- Owner: Yoav Katz
- Chairman: Yoav Katz
- Manager: Haim Silvas (until 5 April 2021); Elisha Levy (from 5 April 2021)
- Stadium: Sammy Ofer
- Ligat Ha'Al: 9th
- State Cup: Round of 16
- Toto Cup: 14th
- Top goalscorer: League: Hanan Maman (8); All: Hanan Maman (9)
- Biggest win: 3 - 1 (vs Beitar Jerusalem, 3 May 2021)
- Biggest defeat: 0 - 3 (vs Hapoel Hadera, 18 April 2021)
Home colours	Away colours	Third colours

Hapoel Haifa Football Club is an Israeli football club located in Haifa. During the 2020–21 campaignthe club have competed in the Israeli Premier League, State Cup and Toto Cup.

== Club ==
=== Kits ===
- Provider: Diadora
- Main Sponsor: Moked Hat'ama
- Secondary Sponsor: Garden Events

Home	Away	3rd	GK 1	GK 2

== First team ==
No.	Pos.	Nation	Player
1	GK	ISR	Ran Kadoch
2	DF	ISR	Miki Siroshtein
4	DF	ISR	Dor Malul (Vice-Captain)
5	DF	ISR	Guy Mishpati
6	MF	ISR	Gal Arel
7	MF	ISR	Ido Shahar
8	MF	ISR	Tomer Altman
9	FW	ISR	Eden Ben Basat
10	MF	ISR	Hanan Maman
11	MF	ISR	Ness Zamir
12	FW	ISR	Qais Ganem
13	GK	BIH	Jasmin Burić
14	MF	ISR	Ruslan Barsky
16	FW	ISR	Ahmed Drawshe
17	FW	ISR	Alon Turgeman
19	FW	NGR	William Agada

No.	Pos.	Nation	Player
20	MF	ISR	Sa'ar Fadida
22	GK	ISR	Amit Suari
23	MF	ISR	Yarin Serdal
24	DF	ISR	Liran Serdal
25	DF	ISR	Ben Sterling
26	DF	ISR	Yahav Gurfinkel
27	DF	ISR	Guy Senker
29	FW	ISR	Itay Buganim
31	DF	ISR	Yarin Cohen
32	DF	ISR	Ben Vehava
33	MF	ISR	Yarin Gavri
34	DF	ISR	Or Printi
37	FW	ISR	Rauf Jabarin
55	DF	ISR	Nisso Kapiloto
77	DF	ISR	Mohamed Jaradat

== Transfers ==
=== Summer ===
In:

No.	Pos.	Nation	Player
—	DF	ISR	Raz Nachmias (from Sektzia Nes Tziona)
—	FW	ISR	Ahmed Drawshe (from F.C. Kafr Qasim)
—	FW	ISR	Raz Stein (from Sektzia Nes Tziona)
—	FW	NGR	William Agada (on loan from Hapoel Jerusalem)
—	DF	ISR	Ido Levy (from Hapoel Ra'anana)
—	MF	ISR	Ido Shahar (on loan from Maccabi Tel Aviv)
—	MF	ISR	Bar Cohen (on loan from Maccabi Tel Aviv)
—	FW	ISR	Qais Ganem (on loan from Hapoel Be'er Sheva)
—	MF	ISR	Hanan Maman (from Beitar Jerusalem)
—	MF	ISR	Yahav Gurfinkel (on loan from Maccabi Haifa)
—	MF	ISR	Ruslan Barsky (on loan from Maccabi Tel Aviv)

Out:

No.	Pos.	Nation	Player
—	MF	GBS	Francisco Júnior (free agent)
—	MF	ISR	Gidi Kanyuk (to (Thailand) Buriram United)
—	MF	FRA	Kevin Tapoko (loan return to Hapoel Be'er Sheva)
—	DF	ISR	Ofek Fishler (on loan to Maccabi Ahi Nazareth)
—	DF	ISR	Niv Serdal (to Hapoel Tel Aviv, previously loaned to Hapoel Petah Tikva)
—	FW	ISR	Ofir Mizrahi (to Hapoel Ironi Kiryat Shmona)
—	GK	ISR	Oren Tal (free agent)
—	DF	ISR	Eli Balilty (free agent)
—	FW	SVK	Jakub Sylvestr (free agent)
—	DF	SRB	Nikola Gulan (free agent)
—	MF	ISR	Gil Vermouth (free agent)
—	MF	ISR	Omer Abadi (free agent)
—	FW	ISR	Mahran Lala (to Yermiyahu Holon)
—	MF	ISR	Snir Talias (on loan to Hapoel Iksal)

=== Winter ===
In:

No.	Pos.	Nation	Player
—	FW	ISR	Alon Turgeman (from Austria Wien)

Out:

No.	Pos.	Nation	Player
—	DF	ISR	Raz Nachmias (to Hapoel Hadera)
—	FW	ISR	Almog Buzaglo (to Bnei Yehuda Tel Aviv)
—	DF	ISR	Ido Levy (to Hapoel Hadera)
—	MF	ISR	Bar Cohen (loan return to Maccabi Tel Aviv)
—	FW	ISR	Raz Stein (to Hapoel Tel Aviv)
—	FW	ISR	Dudu Alterovich (on loan to Hapoel Petah Tikva)
—	MF	ISR	Afik Katan (on loan to Maccabi Herzliya)

== Pre-season and friendlies ==
Win Draw Loss

3 August 2020	Hapoel Haifa	0 - 1	Hapoel Hadera	Haifa
18:00		Report	Messika 40'	Stadium: Beit Nagler

26 October 2020	Hapoel Haifa	2 - 5	Hapoel Hadera	Haifa
16:15	Buzaglo; Drawshe	Report	Gozlan; Bongongui; Marmentini; Guma; Oda (pen.)	Stadium: Beit Nagler

17 November 2020	Maccabi Tel Aviv	1 - 0	Hapoel Haifa	Ness Ziona
15:00	Yatzkar 55'	Report		Stadium: Ness Ziona

== Competitions ==
=== Overview ===
Competition	First match	Last match	Starting round	Final position	Record							
Competition	First match	Last match	Starting round	Final position	Pld	W	D	L	GF	GA	GD	Win %
Ligat Ha'Al	30 August 2020	20 May 2021	Matchday 1	9th	33	11	9	13	40	48	−8	33.33
State Cup	20 February 2021	16 March 2021	Eighth Round	Round of 16	2	0	1	1	5	6	−1	0.00
Toto Cup	9 August 2020	23 August 2020	Group stage	14th	4	0	1	3	4	9	−5	0.00
Total					39	11	11	17	49	63	−14	28.21

Last updated: 14 July 2020.
Source: Competitions

== Ligat Ha'Al ==
=== Results summary ===
Overall								Home						Away					
Pld	W	D	L	GF	GA	GD	Pts	W	D	L	GF	GA	GD	W	D	L	GF	GA	GD
33	11	9	13	40	48	−8	42	7	4	6	21	22	−1	4	5	7	19	26	−7

Last updated: 12 May 2019.

=== Results by matchday ===
Matchday	1	2	3	4	5	6	7	8	9	10	11	12	13	14	15	16	17	18	19	20	21	22	23	24	25	26	27	28	29	30	31	32	33
Ground	H	A	H	A	H	A	H	A	H	A	H	A	H	A	H	A	H	A	H	A	H	A	H	A	H	A	H	A	A	H	H	H	A
Result	L	D	W	L	W	L	W	D	L	L	W	W	D	D	L	D	L	W	D	L	D	W	L	D	D	L	L	W	L	W	W	W	L
Position	12	11	8	10	9	10	9	9	9	10	8	7	7	7	8	9	9	9	9	9	9	9	9	9	9	10	10	10	11	10	9	9	9

Updated to match(es) played on 12 May 2019. Source:
A = Away; H = Home; W = Win; D = Draw; L = Loss

=== Regular season ===
Win Draw Loss

30 August 2020 Match 1	Hapoel Haifa	0 - 1	Beitar Jerusalem	Haifa
20:15	Siroshtein (yellow card) 38'; Shahar (yellow card) 60'	Report	Kriaf (yellow card) 30'; Konstantini 90+3'	Stadium: Sammy Ofer; Referee: Roei Rainshraiber

12 September 2020 Match 2	Hapoel Ironi Kiryat Shmona	1 - 1	Hapoel Haifa	Kiryat Shmona
18:00	Lúcio 20' (pen.); Dahan (yellow card) 47'; Ansah (yellow card) 65'; Nachmias (yellow card) 65'	Report	Nachmias (yellow card) 19'; Serdal (yellow card) 25'; Zamir 63'; Mishpati (yellow card) 90'	Stadium: Kiryat Shmona Municipal; Referee: Daniel Bar Natan

9 December 2020 Match 3	Hapoel Haifa	2 - 0	Hapoel Tel Aviv	Haifa
20:00	Ganem (yellow card) 30'; Serdal (yellow card) 37' (goal) 90+4'; Arel 56' (pen.); Barsky (yellow card) 82'	Report	Ovadia (yellow card) 26'; Shlomo (yellow card) 90'	Stadium: Sammy Ofer; Referee: Na'al Oda

31 October 2020 Match 4	Maccabi Petah Tikva	2 - 0	Hapoel Haifa	Petah Tikva
16:15	Baribo 19'; Sakyi (red card) 31'; Inbrum 38'; Levy (yellow card) 64'	Report	Siroshtein (yellow card) 43'; Agada (yellow card) 90'	Stadium: HaMoshava; Referee: Shalpm Ben Avraham

24 November 2020 Match 5	Hapoel Haifa	2 - 1	Bnei Yehuda Tel Aviv	Haifa
18:00	Zamir (yellow card) 61' (goal) 70'; Ganem 67'; Gurfinkel (yellow card) 82'	Report	Moussa (yellow card) 2'; Zrihan 73'; Silva (yellow card) 90+5'	Stadium: Sammy Ofer; Referee: Idan Leiba

7 October 2020 Match 6	Maccabi Netanya	2 - 1	Hapoel Haifa	Netanya
15:00	Ezra 64'; Avraham (yellow card) 69'; Azulay (yellow card) 72'; Vaier (yellow card) 75'; Frater 81'	Report	Malul (yellow card) 69'; Vehava (yellow card) 82'; Agada 90+3'	Stadium: Netanya; Referee: Sagi Berman

21 November 2020 Match 7	Hapoel Haifa	2 - 1	Maccabi Haifa	Haifa
19:50	Vehava (yellow card) 25'; Serdal (yellow card) 61' (goal) 90+1'; Zamir 69'; Siroshtein (yellow card) 83'	Report	Lavi (yellow card) 52'; Donyoh (yellow card) 56'; Planić (yellow card) 81'; Rukavytsya 84' (pen.)	Stadium: Sammy Ofer; Referee: Orel Greenfeld

30 November 2020 Match 8	Hapoel Be'er Sheva	2 - 2	Hapoel Haifa	Jerusalem
20:00	Shviro 8'; Hatuel 41' (yellow card) 45'	Report	Maman 1'; Arel (yellow card) 58'; Ganem 68'	Stadium: Teddy; Referee: Eli Hacmon

5 December 2020 Match 9	Hapoel Haifa	0 - 2	Bnei Sakhnin	Haifa
18:45	Ganem (yellow card) 44'; Vehava (red card) 59'; Serdal (yellow card) 74'; Ben Basat (yellow card) 89'	Report	Kayal (yellow card) 55'; Goldenberg (yellow card) 67'; Khalaila 72'; Barshazki 83'; Gantous (yellow card) 85'	Stadium: Sammy Ofer; Referee: Aviad Shiloah

13 December 2020 Match 10	Maccabi Tel Aviv	4 - 3	Hapoel Haifa	Tel Aviv
20:45	Piven (yellow card) 20'; Cohen 32', 90+4' (pen.); Glazer (yellow card) 40'; Pešić 58'; Rikan 89' (yellow card) 90'	Report	Arel 21' (pen.); Maman 26'; Vehava (yellow card) 56'; Siroshtein (yellow card) 81'; Fadida 87'; Mishpati (yellow card) 90'; Altman (yellow card) 90+6'	Stadium: Bloomfield; Referee: David Fuxman

19 December 2020 Match 11	Hapoel Haifa	2 - 1	Hapoel Kfar Saba	Haifa
15:00	Zamir 49'; Maman 72'; Fadida (yellow card) 85'; Shahar (yellow card) 90+4'	Report	Kizito 20'; Reichert (yellow card) 54'; Fochive (red card) 58'; Danino (yellow card) 81'; Solomon (yellow card) 90+2'	Stadium: Sammy Ofer; Referee: Roei Rainshraiber

22 December 2020 Match 12	F.C. Ashdod	0 - 1	Hapoel Haifa	Ashdod
19:00	Bayo (yellow card) 47'; Yehezkel (yellow card) 50'	Report	Kapiloto (yellow card) 18'; Maman (yellow card) 62'; Buzaglo (yellow card) 84'; Barsky 86'	Stadium: Yud-Alef; Referee: Eitan Shmuelevich

26 December 2020 Match 13	Hapoel Haifa	0 - 0	Hapoel Hadera	Haifa
17:20	Mishpati (yellow card) 65'; Barsky (yellow card) 84'; Zamir (yellow card) 90'	Report	Marshall (yellow card) 88'	Stadium: Sammy Ofer; Referee: Idan Leiba

2 January 2021 Match 14	Beitar Jerusalem	3 - 3	Hapoel Haifa	Jerusalem
20:00	Conte (yellow card) 45+6'; Adi 49'; Atar 63'; Fadida (yellow card) 72'; Shua 73'; Vered (yellow card) 90+2'	Report	Altman (yellow card) 39'; Stein 45+1'; Barsky (yellow card) 64'; Maman 77', 82'	Stadium: Teddy; Referee: Liran Liani

5 January 2021 Match 15	Hapoel Haifa	0 - 2	Hapoel Ironi Kiryat Shmona	Haifa
19:00	Arel (yellow card) 7'; Maman (yellow card) 59'; Barsky (yellow card) 87'	Report	Shaker 10'; Kahat (yellow card) 20'; Dahan (yellow card) 40'; Elo (yellow card) 83'; Nachmias (yellow card) 90'; Rochet (yellow card) 90'; Ansah 90+6'	Stadium: Sammy Ofer; Referee: Orel Grinfeld

23 January 2021 Match 16	Hapoel Tel Aviv	2 - 2	Hapoel Haifa	Tel Aviv
15:00	Altman 22' (pen.), 33' (pen.); Cohen (yellow card) 25'; Bitton (yellow card) 34'; Xulu (yellow card) 41'; Elias (yellow card) 62'	Report	Malul (yellow card) 32'; Maman 42' (pen.); Agada (yellow card) 43'; Stein 78'; Vehava (yellow card) 80'	Stadium: Bloomfield; Referee: Roei Rainshraiber

26 January 2021 Match 17	Hapoel Haifa	1 - 2	Maccabi Petah Tikva	Haifa
19:45	Barsky (yellow card) 10'; Agada 23' (yellow card) 32'	Report	Cooper (yellow card) 47'; Baribo 84'; Abada 90+1'; Eliyahu (yellow card) 90+6'	Stadium: Sammy Ofer; Referee: Erez Papir

1 February 2021 Match 18	Bnei Yehuda Tel Aviv	0 - 2	Hapoel Haifa	Tel Aviv
19:00	Ben Shimon (yellow card) 13'; Sagas (yellow card) 66'; Khattab (yellow card) 77'	Report	Agada 36'; Serdal (yellow card) 68' (goal) 73'; Malul (yellow card) 79'	Stadium: Bloomfield; Referee: Idan Leiba

6 February 2021 Match 19	Hapoel Haifa	0 - 0	Maccabi Netanya	Haifa
18:00	Arel (yellow card) 33'; Serdal (yellow card) 47'; Altman (yellow card) 53'; Siroshtein (yellow card) 63'; Kapiloto (yellow card) 77'	Report	Jaber (yellow card) 18' (yellow-red card) 73'	Stadium: Sammy Ofer; Referee: Na'al Ode

10 February 2021 Match 20	Maccabi Haifa	2 - 0	Hapoel Haifa	Haifa
20:45	Abu Fani (yellow card) 23'; Menahem 54', (yellow card) 55'; Rodríguez (yellow card) 72'; Donyoh 84'; Haziza (yellow card) 90+1'	Report	Arel (yellow card) 23'; Agada (yellow card) 45'; Barsky (yellow card) 74'; Maman (yellow card) 90+3'	Stadium: Sammy Ofer; Referee: Liran Liany

13 February 2021 Match 21	Hapoel Haifa	2 - 2	Hapoel Be'er Sheva	Haifa
15:00	Kapiloto 75'; Agada 81'	Report	Yosefi 23'; Hatuel 28'; Taha (yellow card) 45+1'; Levita (yellow card) 72'; Madmon (yellow card) 83'; Keltjens (yellow card) 83'	Stadium: Sammy Ofer; Referee: Eitan Shmuelevich

27 February 2021 Match 22	Bnei Sakhnin	0 - 1	Hapoel Haifa	Sakhnin
15:00	Kelly (yellow card) 10'; Ryan (yellow card) 55'; Khalaila (yellow card) 64'	Report	Maman (yellow card) 45' (goal) 67'	Stadium: Doha; Referee: Gal Leivovich

4 March 2021 Match 23	Hapoel Haifa	0 - 2	Maccabi Tel Aviv	Haifa
20:45	Barsky (yellow card) 56'; Gurfinkel (yellow card) 82'	Report	Piven (yellow card) 48' (yellow-red card) 55'; Blackman 49' (yellow card) 77'; Ben Haim (yellow card) 61'; Peretz 82'	Stadium: Sammy Ofer; Referee: Eli Hachmon

7 March 2021 Match 24	Hapoel Kfar Saba	0 - 0	Hapoel Haifa	Petah Tikva
20:00	Hopcutt (yellow card) 16'; Muzie (yellow card) 30'; Shor (yellow card) 41'	Report	Serdal (yellow card) 27'; Kapiloto (yellow card) 80'; Agada (yellow card) 85'	Stadium: HaMoshava; Referee: Na'al Ode

13 March 2021 Match 25	Hapoel Haifa	2 - 2	F.C. Ashdod	Haifa
18:00	Kapiloto 28'; Maman (yellow card) 54'; Buganim 90+1'	Report	Bayo 12'; David 15'	Stadium: Sammy Ofer; Attendance: 1,000; Referee: Snir Levi

22 March 2021 Match 26	Hapoel Hadera	3 - 1	Hapoel Haifa	Netanya
20:15	Marmentini 11'; Grechkin (yellow card) 30'; Glazer (yellow card) 33'; Zalka (yellow card) 34'; Odah 43'; Plakuschenko 53'	Report	Ben Basat 62'; Mishpati (yellow card) 88'	Stadium: Netanya; Attendance: 450; Referee: Roei Rainshraiber

==== Regular season table ====
Pos	Team	Pld	W	D	L	GF	GA	GD	Pts	Qualification or relegation
8	Beitar Jerusalem	26	8	8	10	31	32	−1	32	Transfer to the Relegation round
9	Hapoel Hadera	26	8	8	10	26	28	−2	32	Transfer to the Relegation round
10	Hapoel Haifa	26	7	9	10	30	37	−7	30	Transfer to the Relegation round
11	Bnei Sakhnin	26	8	5	13	15	36	−21	29	Transfer to the Relegation round
12	Hapoel Tel Aviv	26	6	9	11	17	28	−11	27	Transfer to the Relegation round

Source: Soccerway
Rules for classification: 1) Points; 2) Goal difference; 3) Matches won; 4) Goals scored; 5) Head-to-head points; 6) Head-to-head goal difference; 7) Head-to-head goals scored; 8) Play-off.

==== Results overview ====
Win Draw Loss

Opposition	Home score	Away score
Beitar Jerusalem	0 - 1	3 - 3
Bnei Sakhnin	0 - 2	1 - 0
Bnei Yehuda Tel Aviv	2 - 1	2 - 0
F.C. Ashdod	2 - 2	1 - 0
Hapoel Be'er Sheva	2 - 2	2 - 2
Hapoel Hadera	0 - 0	1 - 3
Hapoel Ironi Kiryat Shmona	0 - 2	1 - 1
Hapoel Kfar Saba	2 - 1	0 - 0
Hapoel Tel Aviv	2 - 0	2 - 2
Maccabi Haifa	2 - 1	0 - 2
Maccabi Netanya	0 - 0	1 - 2
Maccabi Petah Tikva	1 - 2	0 - 2
Maccabi Tel Aviv	0 - 2	3 - 4

=== Play-off ===
4 April 2021 Match 27	Hapoel Haifa	1 - 3	Bnei Yehuda Tel Aviv	Haifa
20:15	Ben Basat 10'; Altman (yellow card) 29'; Mishpati (yellow card) 35'	Report	Ghadir 12', 42'; Zenati 67'; Cohen (yellow card) 78'; Finish (yellow card) 78'	Stadium: Sammy Ofer; Attendance: 350; Referee: Gal Leivovich

10 April 2021 Match 28	Hapoel Tel Aviv	0 - 2	Hapoel Haifa	Tel Aviv
18:00	Altman (yellow card) 54'	Report	Arel (yellow card) 7'; Agada 42'; Maman 79'	Stadium: Bloomfield; Attendance: 5,000; Referee: Erez Papir

18 April 2021 Match 29	Hapoel Hadera	0 - 3	Hapoel Haifa	Netanya
19:00	Odah (yellow card) 8' (goal) 56'; Plakuschenko 44', 79'	Report	Altman (yellow card) 29'; Ben Basat (red card) 64'; Maman (yellow card) 74'	Stadium: Netanya; Attendance: 500; Referee: Gal Levy

24 April 2021 Match 30	Hapoel Haifa	1 - 0	Bnei Sakhnin	Haifa
18:00	Arel (yellow card) 21' (goal) 40' (pen.); Kadoch (yellow card) 85'; Buganim (yellow card) 90+4'	Report		Stadium: Sammy Ofer; Attendance: 1,500; Referee: Eitan Shmuelevich

3 May 2021 Match 31	Hapoel Haifa	3 - 1	Beitar Jerusalem	Haifa
20:15	Turgeman 31'; Kapiloto 59'; Serdal 77'; Siroshtein (yellow card) 81'	Report	Matheusinho 9'; Vered (yellow card) 15'; Janković (yellow card) 90+1'	Stadium: Sammy Ofer; Attendance: 1,000; Referee: Sapir Berman

8 May 2021 Match 32	Hapoel Haifa	3 - 2	Hapoel Kfar Saba	Haifa
20:15	Barsky 11'; Turgeman 23'; Agada 33'; Siroshtein (red card) 54'; Gurfinkel (yellow card) 65'; Vehava (yellow card) 71'; Ben Basat (yellow card) 81'	Report	Muzie 48'; Atanda (yellow card) 65'; Fadida 72' (pen.)	Stadium: Sammy Ofer; Attendance: 300; Referee: Magad Rushrush

20 May 2021 Match 33	Maccabi Netanya	2 - 0	Hapoel Haifa	Jerusalem
18:00	van der Kaap (yellow card) 12'; Doumbia 56'; Yerushalmi (yellow card) 72'; Ezra 85'	Report	Ben Basat (yellow card) 8'	Stadium: Teddy; Referee: Yoav Mizrahi

==== Relegation round table ====
Pos	Team	Pld	W	D	L	GF	GA	GD	Pts	MNE	HAH	HHA	BEI	HTA	BNS	BnY	HKS
7	Maccabi Netanya	33	13	9	11	43	34	+9	48			2–0	1–0	0–1	0–0		
8	Hapoel Hadera	33	13	9	11	40	34	+6	48	2–2		3–0		0–1	1–0		
9	Hapoel Haifa	33	11	9	13	40	48	−8	42				3–1		1–0	1–3	3–2
10	Beitar Jerusalem	33	10	10	13	40	43	−3	40		0–3				3–1	2–2	3–1
11	Hapoel Tel Aviv	33	9	11	13	24	35	−11	38			0–2	0–0				2–2

Source: Soccerway
Legend: Blue = home team win; Yellow = draw; Red = away team win.
Rules for classification: 1) Points; 2) Goal difference; 3) Matches won; 4) Goals scored; 5) Head-to-head points; 6) Head-to-head goal difference; 7) Head-to-head goals scored; 8) Play-off.

==== Results overview ====
Win Draw Loss

Opposition	Home score	Away score
Beitar Jerusalem	3 - 1	
Bnei Sakhnin	1 - 0	
Bnei Yehuda Tel Aviv	1 - 3	
Hapoel Hadera		0 - 3
Hapoel Kfar Saba	3 - 2	
Hapoel Tel Aviv		2 - 0
Maccabi Netanya		0 - 2

== State Cup ==
=== Round of 32 ===
20 February 2021 Round of 32	Bnei Yehuda Tel Aviv	3 - 3 (4 - 5 p)	Hapoel Haifa	Tel Aviv
17:15	Mori 32'; Mazor 48'; Zenati 104'	Report	Ganem 21'; Shahar (yellow card) 31' (goal) 54'; Buganim 115'	Stadium: Bloomfield; Referee: Igal Frid
	Penalties
	Zenati (penalty scored); Zrihan (penalty scored); Cohen (penalty scored); Khattab (penalty scored); Ben Shimon (penalty missed)		Maman (penalty scored); Shahar (penalty scored); Barsky (penalty scored); Agada (penalty scored); Turgeman (penalty scored)

=== Round of 16 ===
16 March 2021 Round of 16	Hapoel Haifa	2 - 3	Maccabi Tel Aviv	Haifa
20:45	Maman 5'; Vehava (yellow card) 6'; Serdal (yellow card) 61' (yellow-red card) 90+5'; Turgeman 74'; Arel (yellow card) 90'; Malul (yellow card) 90+5'; Fadida (yellow card) 90+5'	Report	Ben Haim 7' (pen.); Kapiloto 12' (o.g.); Blackman 62' (pen.) (yellow card) 90'; Hozez (yellow card) 72'; Hernández (yellow card) 89'; Yeini (yellow card) 90+3'	Stadium: Sammy Ofer; Attendance: 1,500; Referee: Shalom Ben Avraham

== Toto Cup ==
=== Group stage ===
Pos	Team	Pld	W	D	L	GF	GA	GD	Pts	Qualification or relegation	BSK	MHA	IKS	HHA
1	Bnei Sakhnin	3	2	1	0	4	1	+3	7	Possible Final based on other 1st places	—	1–0		
2	Maccabi Haifa	3	2	0	1	2	1	+1	6	Possible 5–6th match based on other 2nd places		—		1–0
3	Ironi Kiryat Shmona	3	0	2	1	3	4	−1	2	Possible 9–10th match based on other 3rd places	1–1	0–1	—	
4	Hapoel Haifa	3	0	1	2	2	5	−3	1	Possible 11–12th match based on other 4th places	0–2		2–2	—

Updated to match(es) played on unknown. Source: Israel Football Association
Rules for classification: 1) points; 2) goal difference; 3) goals for;

9 August 2020 Match 1	Hapoel Haifa	0 - 2	Bnei Sakhnin	Haifa
20:00	Arel (yellow card) 67'; Jabarin (yellow card) 72'	Report	Jaber 3'; Shami 52'	Stadium: Sammy Ofer; Referee: Eitan Shmuelevich

12 August 2020 Match 2	Hapoel Haifa	2 - 2	Hapoel Ironi Kiryat Shmona	Haifa
19:45	Serdal 11'; Agada 32'; Siroshtein (yellow card) 45+1' (yellow-red card) 53'; Buzaglo (yellow card) 81'	Report	Kahat (yellow card) 18'; Lúcio 25' (pen.); Mizrahi 71'	Stadium: Sammy Ofer; Referee: David Fuxman

16 August 2020 Match 3	Maccabi Haifa	1 - 0	Hapoel Haifa	Haifa
20:15	Abu Fani (yellow card) 3'; Menahem (yellow card) 44'; Rukavytsya 51'; Haziza (yellow card) 67'	Report		Stadium: Sammy Ofer; Referee: Shalom Ben Avraham

=== 13-14th classification match ===
23 August 2020 13-14th	Hapoel Hadera	4 - 2	Hapoel Haifa	Netanya
20:00	Marshall 23', 43'; Jaber (yellow card) 38'; Marmentini (yellow card) 40'; Gozlan 90+3'; Cisse (yellow card) 90+5'; Mesika 90+8'	Report	Agada 55'; Mishpati (yellow card) 75'; Arel 90+6' (pen.)	Stadium: Netanya; Attendance: Liran Liani

== Statistics ==
=== Appearances and goals ===
No.	Pos	Nat	Player	Total		Ligat Ha'Al		State Cup		Toto Cup	
No.	Pos	Nat	Player	Apps	Goals	Apps	Goals	Apps	Goals	Apps	Goals
1	GK	(Israel) ISR	Ran Kadoch	27	0	25	0	1	0	1	0
2	DF	(Israel) ISR	Miki Siroshtein	23	0	19	0	1	0	3	0
4	DF	(Israel) ISR	Dor Malul	32	0	29	0	2	0	1	0
5	DF	(Israel) ISR	Guy Mishpati	21	0	17	0	0	0	4	0
6	MF	(Israel) ISR	Gal Arel	35	4	30	3	1	0	4	1
7	MF	(Israel) ISR	Ido Shahar	23	1	21	0	2	1	0	0
8	MF	(Israel) ISR	Tomer Altman	30	0	25	0	2	0	3	0
9	FW	(Israel) ISR	Eden Ben Basat	16	2	15	2	1	0	0	0
10	MF	(Israel) ISR	Hanan Maman	29	9	27	8	2	1	0	0
11	MF	(Israel) ISR	Ness Zamir	20	4	17	4	0	0	3	0
12	FW	(Israel) ISR	Qais Ganem	15	3	14	2	1	1	0	0
13	GK	(Bosnia and Herzegovina) BIH	Jasmin Burić	10	0	6	0	1	0	3	0
14	MF	(Israel) ISR	Ruslan Barsky	28	2	26	2	2	0	0	0
16	FW	(Israel) ISR	Ahmed Drawshe	9	0	9	0	0	0	0	0
17	FW	(Israel) ISR	Alon Turgeman	15	3	13	2	2	1	0	0
19	FW	(Nigeria) NGR	William Agada	30	8	25	6	1	0	4	2
20	MF	(Israel) ISR	Sa'ar Fadida	36	1	31	1	1	0	4	0
22	GK	(Israel) ISR	Amit Suari	3	0	3	0	0	0	0	0
23	MF	(Israel) ISR	Yarin Serdal	3	0	0	0	0	0	3	0
24	DF	(Israel) ISR	Liran Serdal	32	5	28	4	1	0	3	1
25	DF	(Israel) ISR	Ben Sterling	0	0	0	0	0	0	0	0
26	DF	(Israel) ISR	Yahav Gurfinkel	32	0	30	0	2	0	0	0
27	DF	(Israel) ISR	Guy Senker	0	0	0	0	0	0	0	0
29	FW	(Israel) ISR	Itay Buganim	11	2	9	1	2	1	0	0
31	DF	(Israel) ISR	Yarin Cohen	2	0	0	0	0	0	2	0
32	DF	(Israel) ISR	Ben Vehava	22	0	20	0	2	0	0	0
33	MF	(Israel) ISR	Yarin Gavri	1	0	1	0	0	0	0	0
34	DF	(Israel) ISR	Or Printi	0	0	0	0	0	0	0	0
37	FW	(Israel) ISR	Rauf Jabarin	1	0	0	0	0	0	1	0
55	DF	(Israel) ISR	Nisso Kapiloto	22	3	21	3	1	0	0	0
77	DF	(Israel) ISR	Mohamed Jaradat	1	0	1	0	0	0	0	0
Players away from Hapoel Haifa on loan:
27	MF	(Israel) ISR	Snir Talias	1	0	0	0	0	0	1	0
28	FW	(Israel) ISR	Dudu Alterovich	3	0	0	0	0	0	3	0
21	MF	(Israel) ISR	Afik Katan	3	0	0	0	0	0	3	0
Players who appeared for Hapoel Haifa that left during the season:
10	FW	(Israel) ISR	Mahran Lala	1	0	0	0	0	0	1	0
15	DF	(Israel) ISR	Raz Nachmias	6	0	3	0	0	0	3	0
77	FW	(Israel) ISR	Almog Buzaglo	14	0	10	0	0	0	4	0
16	DF	(Israel) ISR	Ido Levy	5	0	2	0	0	0	3	0
18	MF	(Israel) ISR	Bar Cohen	3	0	3	0	0	0	0	0
99	FW	(Israel) ISR	Raz Stein	18	2	15	2	0	0	3	0

=== Goalscorers ===
Rank	No.	Pos	Nat	Name	Ligat Ha'Al	State Cup	Toto Cup	Total
1	10	MF	(Israel)	Hanan Maman	8	1	0	9
2	19	FW	(Nigeria)	William Agada	6	0	2	8
3	24	DF	(Israel)	Liran Serdal	4	0	1	5
4	11	MF	(Israel)	Ness Zamir	4	0	0	4
4	6	MF	(Israel)	Gal Arel	3	0	1	4
6	55	DF	(Israel)	Nisso Kapiloto	3	0	0	3
6	12	FW	(Israel)	Qais Ganem	2	1	0	3
6	17	FW	(Israel)	Alon Turgeman	2	1	0	3
9	9	FW	(Israel)	Eden Ben Basat	2	0	0	2
9	14	MF	(Israel)	Ruslan Barsky	2	0	0	2
9	99	FW	(Israel)	Raz Stein	2	0	0	2
9	29	FW	(Israel)	Itay Buganim	1	1	0	2
13	20	MF	(Israel)	Sa'ar Fadida	1	0	0	1
13	7	MF	(Israel)	Ido Shahar	0	1	0	1
Own goal					0	0	0	0
Totals					40	5	4	49

Last updated: 12 May 2019

=== Assists ===
Rank	No.	Pos	Nat	Name	Ligat Ha'Al	State Cup	Toto Cup	Total
1	19	FW	(Nigeria)	William Agada	4	2	0	6
2	10	MF	(Israel)	Hanan Maman	3	1	0	4
3	20	MF	(Israel)	Sa'ar Fadida	3	0	0	3
3	11	MF	(Israel)	Ness Zamir	2	0	1	3
5	4	DF	(Israel)	Dor Malul	2	0	0	2
5	6	MF	(Israel)	Gal Arel	2	0	0	2
5	9	FW	(Israel)	Eden Ben Basat	2	0	0	2
5	17	FW	(Israel)	Alon Turgeman	2	0	0	2
5	26	DF	(Israel)	Yahav Gurfinkel	2	0	0	2
5	55	DF	(Israel)	Nisso Kapiloto	0	2	0	2
11	5	DF	(Israel)	Guy Mishpati	1	0	0	1
11	7	MF	(Israel)	Ido Shahar	1	0	0	1
11	12	FW	(Israel)	Qais Ganem	1	0	0	1
11	14	MF	(Israel)	Ruslan Barsky	1	0	0	1
11	15	DF	(Israel)	Raz Nachmias	1	0	0	1
11	16	FW	(Israel)	Ahmed Drawshe	1	0	0	1
11	24	DF	(Israel)	Liran Serdal	1	0	0	1
Totals					28	5	1	34

Last updated: 12 May 2019

=== Clean sheets ===
Updated on 12 May 2019

Rank	Pos.	No.	Name	Ligat Ha'Al	State Cup	Toto Cup	Total
1	GK	(Israel)	Ran Kadoch	9	0	0	9
Totals				9	0	0	9

=== Disciplinary record ===
Updated on 12 May 2019

No.	Pos	Nat	Name	Ligat Ha'Al			State Cup			Toto Cup			Total		
No.	Pos	Nat	Name	Yellow card	(yellow card) (yellow-red card)	Red card	Yellow card	(yellow card) (yellow-red card)	Red card	Yellow card	(yellow card) (yellow-red card)	Red card	Yellow card	(yellow card) (yellow-red card)	Red card
2	DF	(Israel)	Miki Siroshtein	6		1					1		6	1	1
24	DF	(Israel)	Liran Serdal	7				1					7	1	
6	MF	(Israel)	Gal Arel	6			1			1			8		
32	DF	(Israel)	Ben Vehava	5		1	1						6		1
14	MF	(Israel)	Ruslan Barsky	7									7		
10	MF	(Israel)	Hanan Maman	6									6		
5	DF	(Israel)	Guy Mishpati	5						1			6		
8	MF	(Israel)	Tomer Altman	5									5		
19	FW	(Nigeria)	William Agada	5									5		
9	FW	(Israel)	Eden Ben Basat	3		1							3		1
4	DF	(Israel)	Dor Malul	3			1						4		
26	DF	(Israel)	Yahav Gurfinkel	3									3		
55	DF	(Israel)	Nisso Kapiloto	3									3		
7	MF	(Israel)	Ido Shahar	2			1						3		
11	MF	(Israel)	Ness Zamir	2									2		
12	FW	(Israel)	Qais Ganem	2									2		
20	MF	(Israel)	Sa'ar Fadida	1			1						2		
77	FW	(Israel)	Almog Buzaglo	1						1			2		
1	GK	(Israel)	Ran Kadoch	1									1		
29	FW	(Israel)	Itay Buganim	1									1		
15	DF	(Israel)	Raz Nachmias	1									1		
37	DF	(Israel)	Rauf Jabarin							1			1		

=== Suspensions ===
Updated on 12 May 2019

Player	Date Received	Offence	Length of suspension		
Miki Siroshtein	12 August 2020	(yellow card) 45+1' (yellow-red card) 53' vs Hapoel Ironi Kiryat Shmona	1 Match	Maccabi Haifa (A)	16 August 2020
Ben Vehava	5 December 2020	(red card) 59' vs Bnei Sakhnin	1 Match	Hapoel Tel Aviv (H)	9 December 2020
Ruslan Barsky	26 January 2021	(yellow card) 10' vs Maccabi Petah Tikva	1 Match	Maccabi Netanya (H)	6 February 2021
Liran Serdal	1 February 2021	(yellow card) 68' vs Bnei Yehuda Tel Aviv	1 Match	Maccabi Haifa (A)	10 February 2021
Miki Siroshtein	6 February 2021	(yellow card) 63' vs Maccabi Netanya	1 Match	Hapoel Be'er Sheva (H)	13 February 2021
Eden Ben Basat	17 February 2021		1 Match	Bnei Yehuda Tel Aviv (A)	20 February 2021
Gal Arel	17 February 2021		2 Match	Bnei Yehuda Tel Aviv (A); Bnei Sakhnin (A)	20 February 2021; 27 February 2021
Nisso Kapiloto	17 February 2021		3 Match	Bnei Yehuda Tel Aviv (A); Bnei Sakhnin (A); Maccabi Tel Aviv (H)	20 February 2021; 27 February 2021; 4 March 2021
Dor Malul	17 February 2021		1 Match	Hapoel Kfar Saba (A)	7 March 2021
Alon Turgeman	17 February 2021		2 Match	Hapoel Kfar Saba (A); F.C. Ashdod (H)	7 March 2021; 13 March 2021
William Agada	7 March 2021	(yellow card) 85' vs Hapoel Kfar Saba	1 Match	Maccabi Tel Aviv (H)	16 March 2021
Hanan Maman	13 March 2021	(yellow card) 54' vs F.C. Ashdod	1 Match	Hapoel Hadera (A)	22 March 2021
Liran Serdal	16 March 2021	(yellow card) 61' (yellow-red card) 90+5' vs Maccabi Tel Aviv	1 Match	Hapoel Hadera (A)	22 March 2021
Ben Vehava	16 March 2021	(yellow card) 6' vs Maccabi Tel Aviv	1 Match	Bnei Yehuda Tel Aviv (H)	4 April 2021
Gal Arel	16 March 2021	(yellow card) 90' vs Maccabi Tel Aviv	1 Match	Bnei Yehuda Tel Aviv (H)	4 April 2021
Guy Mishpati	4 April 2021	(yellow card) 35' vs Bnei Yehuda Tel Aviv	1 Match	Hapoel Hadera (A)	18 April 2021
Eden Ben Basat	18 April 2021	(red card) 64' vs Hapoel Hadera	1 Match	Bnei Sakhnin (H)	24 April 2021
Tomer Altman	18 April 2021	(yellow card) 29' vs Hapoel Hadera	1 Match	Beitar Jerusalem (H)	2 May 2021
Miki Siroshtein	8 May 2021	(red card) 54' vs Hapoel Kfar Saba	1 Match	Maccabi Netanya (A)	20 May 2021

=== Penalties ===
Updated on 12 May 2019

Date	Penalty Taker	Scored	Opponent	Competition
23.8.2020	Gal Arel	Yes	Hapoel Hadera	Toto Cup
9.12.2020	Gal Arel	Yes	Hapoel Tel Aviv	Ligat Ha'Al
13.12.2020	Gal Arel	Yes	Maccabi Tel Aviv	Ligat Ha'Al
23.1.2021	Hanan Maman	Yes	Hapoel Tel Aviv	Ligat Ha'Al
24.4.2021	Gal Arel	Yes	Bnei Sakhnin	Ligat Ha'Al

=== Overall ===
	Total	Home	Away	Natural
Games played	39	20	19	0
Games won	11	7	4	
Games drawn	11	5	6	
Games lost	17	8	9	
Biggest win	3 - 1 vs Beitar Jerusalem	3 - 1 vs Beitar Jerusalem	2 - 0 vs Bnei Yehuda Tel Aviv; 2 - 0 vs Hapoel Tel Aviv	
Biggest loss	0 - 3 vs Hapoel Hadera	1 - 3 vs Bnei Yehuda Tel Aviv	0 - 3 vs Hapoel Hadera	
Biggest win (League)	3 - 1 vs Beitar Jerusalem	3 - 1 vs Beitar Jerusalem	2 - 0 vs Bnei Yehuda Tel Aviv; 2 - 0 vs Hapoel Tel Aviv	
Biggest loss (League)	0 - 3 vs Hapoel Hadera	1 - 3 vs Bnei Yehuda Tel Aviv	0 - 3 vs Hapoel Hadera	
Biggest win (Cup)				
Biggest loss (Cup)	2 - 3 vs Maccabi Tel Aviv	2 - 3 vs Maccabi Tel Aviv		
Biggest win (Toto)				
Biggest loss (Toto)	2 - 4 vs Hapoel Hadera	0 - 2 vs Bnei Sakhnin	2 - 4 vs Hapoel Hadera	
Goals scored	49	25	24	
Goals conceded	63	29	34	
Goal difference	-14	-4	-10	
Clean sheets	9	4	5	
Average GF per game	1.26	1.25	1.26	
Average GA per game	1.62	1.45	1.79	
Yellow cards	88	51	37	
Red cards	5	4	1	
Most appearances	(Israel) Sa'ar Fadida (36)			
Most goals	(Israel) Hanan Maman (9)			
Most Assist	(Nigeria) William Agada (6)			
Penalties for	5	2	3	
Penalties against	9	5	4	
Winning rate	28.21%	35%	21.05%	

Last updated: Updated on 14 June 2020
Source: Competitive matches
