= 2020–21 Maccabi Haifa F.C. season =

Maccabi Haifa
2020–21 season
- President: Ya'akov Shahar
- Head coach: Barak Bakhar
- Stadium: Sammy Ofer
- Ligat Ha'Al: Champions
- State Cup: Semi-final
- Toto Cup: 6th
- Europa League: Play-off round
- Top goalscorer: League: Nikita Rukavytsya (19); All: Nikita Rukavytsya(23)
- Highest home attendance: 30,000 vs (vs Hapoel Beer Sheva, 30 May 2021) (Note: due to the COVID-19 pandemic in Israel played until 6 March 2021 Behind closed doors between from 17 March 2021 to 22 April 2021 the number of attendance was limited .)
- Lowest home attendance: 1,500 vs (vs Maccabi Petah Tikva, 17 March 2021)
- Average home league attendance: 11,911
Home colours	Away colours	Third colours

The 2020–21 season was Maccabi Haifa's 63rd season in Israeli Premier League, and their 39th consecutive season in the top division of Israeli football. In this season, the team won its first championship in a decade.

== Club ==
=== Squad information ===
N	Pos.	Nat.	Name	Age	EU	Since	App	Goals	Ends	Transfer fee	Notes
5	DF	(Serbia)	Bogdan Planić	33	EU	2020/2021	36	4	2022/2023	Free	
6	MF	(Israel)	Neta Lavi (captain)	28	Non-EU	2015/2016	208	10	2022/2023	Youth system	
7	FW	(Netherlands)	Yanic Wildschut	33	EU	2019/2020	70	7	2020/2021	Free	
8	FW	(Israel)	Dolev Haziza	31	Non-EU	2019/2020	84	16	2021/2022	310,000€	Second nationality:France
9	FW	(Israel)	Omer Atzili	31	Non-EU	2021/2021	24	6	2023/2024	Free	Second nationality:Romania
10	MF	(Suriname)	Tjaronn Chery (vice captain)	36	EU	2019/2020	85	24	2022/2023	Free	Second nationality:Nederland
11	FW	(Ghana)	Godsway Donyoh	30	Non-EU	2020/2021	33	9	2021/2022	50,000€	
12	DF	(Israel)	Sun Menahem	31	Non-EU	2015/2016	159	8	2020/2021	20,000€	
13	FW	(Australia)	Nikita Rukavytsya	37	EU	2016/2017	193	82	2020/2021	400,000€	Second nationality:Israel
14	MF	(Spain)	José Rodríguez	30	EU	2021/2022	35	1	2022/2023	Free	
15	DF	(Israel)	Ofri Arad	26	EU	2018/2019	107	6	2023/2024	Youth system	Second nationality: Germany
16	MF	(Israel)	Mohammad Abu Fani	26	Non-EU	2016/2017	64	4	2020/2021	Youth system	
17	DF	(Israel)	Taleb Tawatha	32	Non-EU	2009/2010	233	7	2023/2024	€100,000	Originally from youth system
18	MF	(Israel)	Yuval Ashkenazi	32	Non-EU	2019/2020	66	14	2020/2021	310,000€	
19	FW	(Israel)	Stav Nahmani	22	Non-EU	2019/2020	13	0	2024/2025	Youth system	
21	DF	(Israel)	Ayid Habshi	29	Non-EU	2012/2013	115	1	2023/2024	Youth system	
22	FW	(Israel)	Mohammed Awaed	28	Non-EU	2014/2015	116	21	2022/2023	Youth system	
25	DF	(Israel)	Raz Meir	29	Non-EU	2017/2018	100	4	2020/2021	Free	Originally from youth system
26	DF	(Cameroon)	Ernest Mabouka	36	Non-EU	2017/2018	143	1	2020/2021	€300,000	
32	FW	(Israel)	Nehorai Ifrach	21	Non-EU	2020/2021	3	0	2025/2026	Youth system	
33	MF	(Israel)	Maor Levi	24	Non-EU	2019/2020	31	0	2023/2024	Youth system	
35	DF	(Israel)	Rony Laufer	24	Non-EU	2020/2021	0	0	2020/2021	Youth system	
44	GK	(United States)	Josh Cohen	32	Non-EU	2019/2020	77	0	2020/2021	Free	Second nationality:Israel
52	GK	(Israel)	Omri Glazer	29	Non-EU	2016/2017	72	0	2020/2021	250,000€	
55	DF	(Israel)	Rami Gershon	36	Non-EU	2017/2018	72	0	2021/2022	400,000€	
77	GK	(Israel)	Roee Fucs	26	Non-EU	2021/2021	0	0	2020/2021	Youth system	

- Last updated: 31 May 2021
- Source: mhaifafc.com, Israel Football Association, UEFA Players transfer,
- Ordered by squad number.

=== Current coaching staff ===
Position	Staff
Head coach	(Israel) Barak Bakhar
Assistant coach	(Israel) Guy Tzarfati
Fitness coach	(England) Dr. Neil Clarke (Israel) Dror Shimshon (Israel) Uri Harel
Goalkeeping coach	(Israel) Guy Weisinger
Club Administrator	(Israel) Gil Ofek
Chief Scout	(Israel) Gal Alberman
Manager Mental	(Israel) Eitan Azaria
Analyst	(Israel) Adam Daivid

== Transfers ==
=== In ===
Date	Pos.	Player	Age	Moving from	Type	Fee	Notes	Source
26 July 2020	GK	(Israel) Omri Glazer	29	(Israel) Sektzia Nes Tziona	Loan returns	Free		
26 July 2020	GK	(Israel) Roee Fucs	26	(Israel) Hapoel Nof HaGalil	Loan returns	Free		
26 July 2020	DF	(Israel) Yahav Gurfinkel	27	(Israel) Hapoel Hadera	Loan returns	Free		
26 July 2020	MF	(Israel) Mohammad Abu Fani	26	(Israel) Hapoel Hadera	Loan returns	Free		
26 July 2020	MF	(The Gambia) Saikou Touray	24	(Israel) Sektzia Nes Tziona	Loan returns	Free		
6 August 2020	MF	(Israel) Ihab Abu Alshikh	25	(Israel) Beitar Tel Aviv Bat Yam	Transfer	€225,000		
25 August 2020	MF	(Israel) Oded Chekol	25	(Israel) Hapoel Nof HaGalil	Transfer	€75,000		
25 August 2020	DF	(Israel) Tom Sklovin	24	(Israel) Hapoel Nof HaGalil	Transfer	€75,000		
6 September 2020	DF	(Serbia) Bogdan Planić	33	(Romania) FCSB	Transfer	Free		
10 September 2020	MF	(Spain) José Rodríguez	30	(Spain) Málaga CF	Transfer	Free		
26 September 2020	FW	(Ghana) Godsway Donyoh	30	(Denmark) FC Nordsjælland	Transfer	€50,000		
16 October 2020	DF	(Israel) Taleb Tawatha	32	(Bulgaria) Ludogorets Razgrad	Transfer	€100,000		
13 January 2021	FW	(Israel) Omer Atzili	31	(Cyprus) APOEL Nicosia	Transfer	Free		
11 February 2021	FW	(Israel) Mohammed Awaed	27	(Poland) Lech Poznań	Loan returns	Free		

=== Out ===
Date	Pos.	Player	Age	Type	Fee	Moving to	Notes	Source
1 July 2020	GK	(United States) Joe Kuzminsky	31	End of Loan	Free	(United States) Charleston Battery		
9 July 2020	MF	(Israel) Suf Podgoreanu	23	End of Contract		(Italy) Roma		
7 July 2020	GK	(Israel) Guy Haimov	39	Retired				
15 July 2020	GK	(Israel) Gil Ofek	39	Retired				
26 July 2020	DF	(Ghana) David Acquah	23	Loan Out	Free	(Israel) Hapoel Nof HaGalil		
28 July 2020	DF	(Nigeria) Ikouwem Utin	25	Loan Out	Free	(Israel) Bnei Sakhnin		
4 August 2020	MF	(Israel) Sintayehu Sallalich	33	End of Contract	Free	(Israel) Hapoel Be'er Sheva		
5 August 2020	MF	(Israel) Maxim Plakuschenko	29	Loan Out	Free	(Israel) Hapoel Hadera		
17 August 2020	DF	(Australia) Trent Sainsbury	33	Release	Free	(Belgium) K.V. Kortrijk		
25 August 2020	MF	(Israel) Oded Chekol	25	Loan Out	Free	(Israel) Hapoel Nof HaGalil		
25 August 2020	DF	(Israel) Tom Sklovin	24	Loan Out	Free	(Israel) Hapoel Nof HaGalil		
8 September 2020	FW	(Israel) Mohammed Awaed	27	Loan Out	Free	(Poland) Lech Poznań		
11 September 2020	DF	(Israel) Yonatan Levi	27	Loan Out	Free	(Israel) Hapoel Iksal		
16 September 2020	DF	(Israel) Ibrahim Jawabry	24	Loan Out	Free	(Israel) Sektzia Nes Tziona		
27 September 2020	MF	(The Gambia) Saikou Touray	24	Loan Out	Free	(Israel) Ironi Kiryat Shmona		
16 October 2020	FW	(Israel) Yarden Shua	25	Transfer	1,400,000€	(Israel) Beitar Jerusalem		
4 November 2020	DF	(Israel) Yahav Gurfinkel	26	Loan Out	Free	(Israel) Hapoel Haifa		
5 November 2020	GK	(Israel) Shareef Kayouf	23	Loan Out	Free	(Israel) Hapoel Kfar Shalem		
4 February 2021	MF	(Israel) Timothy Muzie	23	Loan Out	Free	(Israel) Hapoel Kfar Saba		
11 February 2021	MF	(Israel) Ihab Abu Alshikh	25	Loan Out	Free	(Israel) Maccabi Petah Tikva		

== Pre-season and friendlies ==
Win Draw Loss Postponed

31 July 2020	Maccabi Haifa	1-2	Hapoel Nof HaGalil
	Plakuschenko 71'	Report	Oded Chekol 23'; Wahib Habib-Allah 36'

14 October 2020	FK Kolubara (Serbia)	1-0	(Israel) Maccabi Haifa
19:30		[ Report]

18 October 2020	FK IMT (Serbia)	1-3	(Israel) Maccabi Haifa
16:30		[ Report]	Chery 1'; Yahab El Abed 68', 72'

27 October 2020	Maccabi Haifa	4-0	Hapoel Nof HaGalil
	Timothy Muzie 40'; Rukavytsya 42'; Wildschut 54'; Chery 86'	Report

12 November 2020	Maccabi Haifa	5-2	Maccabi Netanya
	Haziza 30'; Meir 34'; Stav Nahmani 75'; Donyoh 75', 78'	Report	Ezra 85'; Banda 89' (pen.)

== Competitions ==
=== Overview ===
Competition	First match	Last match	Starting round	Final position	Record							
Competition	First match	Last match	Starting round	Final position	Pld	W	D	L	GF	GA	GD	Win %
Ligat Ha'Al	30 August 2020	30 May 2021	Matchday 1	Winners	36	24	7	5	72	29	+43	66.67
State Cup	20 February 2021	20 May 2021	Eighth Round	Semi-finals	4	3	0	1	8	5	+3	75.00
Toto Cup	13 August 2017	16 August 2020	Group stage	6th	4	2	0	2	2	2	+0	50.00
UEFA Europa League	9 September 2020	1 October 2020	First qualifying round	Play-off round	4	3	0	1	9	10	−1	75.00
Total					48	32	7	9	91	46	+45	66.67

Last updated: 31 May 2021
Source: Competitions

== Ligat Ha'Al ==
=== Regular season ===
Win Draw Loss

30 August 2020 1	Hapoel Hadera	1–2	Maccabi Haifa	Netanya
20:30	Maxim Plakuschenko (yellow card) 24'; Marshall (yellow card) 25', (goal) 45'; Meledje (yellow card) 90'	Report	Rukavytsya 8', 26'; Lavi (yellow card) 45'; Haziza (yellow card) 56'	Stadium: Netanya Stadium; Attendance: 0 (Note: due to the COVID-19 pandemic in Israel played Behind closed doors); Referee: Ohad Assulin

13 September 2020 2	Maccabi Haifa	3–1	Hapoel Be'er Sheva	Haifa
21:00	Rukavytsya 23', 62'; Arad (yellow card) 25'; Lavi (yellow card) 42'; Abu Fani (yellow card) 49'; Wildschut 73', (yellow card) 86'; Menahem (yellow card) 90'	Report	David Keltjens (yellow card) 17'; Shviro 58'; Dadia (yellow card) 65'	Stadium: Sammy Ofer Stadium; Attendance: 0 Referee: Eli Hacmon

1 November 2020 4	Maccabi Haifa	2–2	Maccabi Tel Aviv	Haifa
21:00	Chery 7'; Rukavytsya 8'; Rodríguez (yellow card) 21'; Mabouka (yellow card) 58'; Abu Fani (yellow card) 86'; Arad (yellow card) 86'	Report	Golasa (yellow card) 28'; Guerrero 38'; Cohen 70'; Peretz (yellow card) 90+1'	Stadium: Sammy Ofer Stadium; Attendance: 0 Referee: Eli Hacmon
Note: originally scheduled for 3 October 2020 due to the COVID-19 pandemic in Israel The league was postponed indefinitely.

7 November 2020 6	Maccabi Haifa	2–1	F.C. Ashdod	Haifa
18:45	Planić (yellow card) 13'; Haziza (yellow card) 31'; Habshi (yellow card) 37'; Rukavytsya 45+2' (pen.); Chery 63'	Report	Fahad Bayo (yellow card) 9'; Gordana (yellow card) 45+1'; Awany (yellow card) 45+2'; Yehezkel (yellow card) 71'	Stadium: Sammy Ofer Stadium; Attendance: 0 Referee: David Foxman
Note: originally scheduled for 24 October 2020 due to the COVID-19 pandemic in Israel The league was postponed indefinitely.

21 November 2020 7	Hapoel Haifa	2–1	Maccabi Haifa	Haifa
19:50	Vehava (yellow card) 24'; Serdal (yellow card) 61', (goal) 90+2'; Zamir 67'; Siroshtein (yellow card) 83'	Report	Lavi (yellow card) 52'; Donyoh (yellow card) 56'; Planić (yellow card) 81'; Rukavytsya 84' (pen.)	Stadium: Sammy Ofer Stadium; Attendance: 0 Referee: Orel Grinfeld
Note: originally scheduled for 31 October 2020 due to the COVID-19 pandemic in Israel The league was postponed indefinitely.

24 November 2020 5	Hapoel Kfar Saba	3–2	Maccabi Haifa	Petah Tikva
20:00	Reichert (yellow card) 18'; Kizito 49', 70' (pen.); Arad 53' (o.g.); Aviv Solomon (yellow card) 57'; Matan Zalmanovic (yellow card) 85'	Report	Arad 22'; Rukavytsya (penalty missed) 38, 90+8'	Stadium: HaMoshava Stadium; Attendance: 0 Referee: Snir Levi
Note: originally scheduled for 17 October 2020 due to the COVID-19 pandemic in Israel The league was postponed indefinitely.

30 November 2020 8	Maccabi Haifa	2–0	Beitar Jerusalem	Haifa
20:45	Rukavytsya (yellow card) 5' (penalty missed) 13, 45+2'; Abu Fani (yellow card) 31'; Haziza 34'; Cohen (yellow card) 75'; Lavi (yellow card) 90+5'	Report	Nitzan (yellow card) 12'; Dgani (yellow card) 30'	Stadium: Sammy Ofer Stadium; Attendance: 0 Referee: Liran Liani
Note: originally scheduled for 7 November 2020 due to the COVID-19 pandemic in Israel The league was postponed indefinitely.

5 December 2020 9	Ironi Kiryat Shmona	0–3	Maccabi Haifa	Kiryat Shmona
15:00	Ansah (yellow card) 40'; Ziv Morgan (yellow card) 54'	Report	Arad (yellow card) 31'; Haziza 74' (pen.); Nachmias 78' (o.g.); Rukavytsya 84'; Maor Levi (yellow card) 90+3'	Stadium: Municipal Stadium; Attendance: 0 Referee: Gal Leibovich
Note: originally scheduled for 28 November 2020 due to the COVID-19 pandemic in Israel The league was postponed indefinitely.

8 December 2020 3	Bnei Sakhnin	0–3	Maccabi Haifa	Sakhnin
17:00		Report	Menahem 5'; Meir (yellow card) 32'; Chery 66'; Haziza 74'	Stadium: Doha Stadium; Attendance: 0 Referee: Daniel Bar Natan
Note: Originally scheduled for 20 September 2020 due to the COVID-19 pandemic in Israel The league was postponed indefinitely.

14 December 2020 10	Maccabi Haifa	1–0	Hapoel Tel Aviv	Haifa
20:45	Rukavytsya 20'; Arad (yellow card) 68'; Lavi (yellow card) 72'	Report	Osher Davida (yellow card) 61'	Stadium: Sammy Ofer Stadium; Attendance: 0 Referee: Roi Reinshreiber
Note: Originally scheduled for 5 December 2020 due to the COVID-19 pandemic in Israel The league was postponed indefinitely.

19 December 2020 11	Maccabi Petah Tikva	1–2	Maccabi Haifa	Petah Tikva
19:50	Sabag 4'; Inbrum (yellow card) 29'; Or Blorian (yellow card) 38'; Amit Meir (yellow card) 90+3'; Yinon Eliyahu (penalty missed) 90+8	Report	Rukavytsya 8'; Rodríguez (yellow card) 45'; Abu Fani (penalty missed) 45+1; Haziza 79'; Chery (yellow card) 85'; Arad (yellow card) 90+6'	Stadium: HaMoshava Stadium; Attendance: 0 Referee: Eli Hacmon
Note: Originally scheduled for 12 December 2020 due to the COVID-19 pandemic in Israel The league was postponed indefinitely.

22 December 2020 12	Maccabi Haifa	3–0	Bnei Yehuda	Haifa
20:05	Donyoh 37'; Planić (yellow card) 39', (goal) 50'; Abu Fani (yellow card) 70'; Chery 87' (pen.)	Report	Finish (yellow card) 25'; Ljujić (penalty missed) 63; Mori (yellow card) 85'	Stadium: Sammy Ofer Stadium; Attendance: 0 Referee: Ohad Assulin

26 December 2020 13	Maccabi Netanya	0–2	Maccabi Haifa	Netanya
19:50	van der Kaap (yellow card) 30'; Banda (yellow card) 71'; Karam Jaber (yellow card) 83'	Report	Haziza 4'; Rukavytsya 19'	Stadium: Netanya Stadium; Attendance: 0 Referee: Orel Grinfeld

2 January 2021 14	Maccabi Haifa	1–0	Hapoel Hadera	Haifa
17:10	Abu Fani (yellow card) 38'; Chery 50'; Rukavytsya (yellow card) 81'; Haziza (yellow card) 89'; Rodríguez (yellow card) 90+2'	Report	Dia Lababidi (yellow card) 37'; Meledje (yellow card) 43'	Stadium: Sammy Ofer Stadium; Attendance: 0 Referee: Eitan Shemeulevitch

5 January 2021 15	Hapoel Be'er Sheva	1–1	Maccabi Haifa	Jerusalem
20:45	Yosefi 41'; Josué (yellow card) 77' (yellow-red card) 88'; Levita (yellow card) 89'	Report	Rodríguez (yellow card) 10'; Menahem (yellow card) 37'; Haziza (yellow card) 67'; Taha 74' (o.g.); Planić (yellow card) 87'	Stadium: Teddy Stadium; Attendance: 0 Referee: Igal Frid

23 January 2021 16	Maccabi Haifa	3–0	Bnei Sakhnin	Haifa
20:00	Menahem 40'; Ashkenazi (yellow card) 43'; Rukavytsya 70' (pen.); Arad (yellow card) 89'; Haziza 90+10' (pen.)	Report	Moti Malka (yellow card) 52'; Mohamed Sayed Ahmed (yellow card) 67'; Ihab Ganayem (yellow card) 76'; Goldenberg (yellow card) 90+5'	Stadium: Sammy Ofer Stadium; Attendance: 0 Referee: Aviad Shiloach
Note: originally scheduled for 10 January 2021 due to the COVID-19 pandemic in Israel The league was postponed indefinitely.

27 January 2021 17	Maccabi Tel Aviv	2–1	Maccabi Haifa	Tel Aviv
20:45	Ben Haim (yellow card) 17', (goal) 21'; Karzev (yellow card) 39'; Saborit (yellow card) 45'; Shechter (yellow card) 45'; Piven (yellow card) 84'; Pešić 90+5' (pen.)	Report	Piven 18' (o.g.); Lavi (yellow card) 45'; Rodríguez (yellow card) 45'	Stadium: Bloomfield Stadium; Attendance: 0 Referee: Orel Grinfeld
Note: Originally scheduled for 19 January 2021 due to the COVID-19 pandemic in Israel The league was postponed indefinitely.

31 January 2021 18	Maccabi Haifa	3–0	Hapoel Kfar Saba	Haifa
20:15	Atzili (yellow card) 13'; Haziza 35'; Rukavytsya 53', 62'	Report	Tom Shelach (yellow card) 60'	Stadium: Sammy Ofer Stadium; Attendance: 0 Referee: Eli Hacmon
Note: originally scheduled for 23 January 2021 due to the COVID-19 pandemic in Israel The league was postponed indefinitely.

6 February 2021 19	F.C. Ashdod	1–0	Maccabi Haifa	Ashdod
20:45	Fares Abu Akel (yellow card) 56'; Berihon 80'	Report	Atzili (yellow card) 28'	Stadium: Yud-Alef Stadium; Attendance: 0 Referee: Erez Papir

10 February 2021 20	Maccabi Haifa	2–0	Hapoel Haifa	Haifa
20:45	Abu Fani (yellow card) 23'; Menahem 54', (yellow card) 55'; Rodríguez (yellow card) 72'; Donyoh 84'; Haziza (yellow card) 90+1'	Report	Arel (yellow card) 23'; Agada (yellow card) 45'; Barsky (yellow card) 74'; Maman (yellow card) 90+3'	Stadium: Sammy Ofer Stadium; Attendance: 0 Referee: Liran Liany

15 February 2021 21	Beitar Jerusalem	0–3	Maccabi Haifa	Jerusalem
20:45	Mohamed (yellow card) 41'; Dgani (red card) 55'	Report	Haziza 17', (yellow card) 35'; Menahem (yellow card) 43'; Chery 50'; Donyoh 53'	Stadium: Teddy Stadium; Attendance: 0 Referee: Roi Reinshreiber

27 February 2021 22	Maccabi Haifa	4–2	Ironi Kiryat Shmona	Haifa
19:50	Planić 10'; Abu Fani (yellow card) 22', (goal) 24', 54'; Wildschut (yellow card) 30'; Donyoh 68'	Report	Lúcio 8'; Ziv Morgan (yellow card) 29'; Bartkus (red card) 30'; Amir Ben-Shimon (yellow card) 37'; Abdallah Khlaikhal 87'	Stadium: Sammy Ofer Stadium; Attendance: 0 Referee: Daniel Bar Natan

3 March 2021 23	Hapoel Tel Aviv	1–2	Maccabi Haifa	Tel Aviv
20:45	Elias 22'; Ben Bitton (yellow card) 60'; Altman (yellow card) 84'	Report	Chery 7'; Rodríguez 26'; Cohen (yellow card) 88'	Stadium: Bloomfield Stadium; Attendance: 0 Referee: Shalom Ben Avraham

6 March 2021 24	Maccabi Haifa	0–2	Maccabi Petah Tikva	Haifa
19:50	Lavi (yellow card) 24'; Habshi (yellow card) 51'; Rodríguez (yellow card) 55'; Mabouka (yellow card) 56'; Cohen (yellow card) 76'; Menahem (yellow card) 86'	Report	Tomer Levy (yellow card) 39'; Eitan Azulay (yellow card) 45'; Habshi 57' (o.g.); Baribo 83'; Amit Meir (yellow card) 86'	Stadium: Sammy Ofer Stadium; Attendance: 0 Referee: Igal Frid

14 March 2021 25	Bnei Yehuda Tel Aviv	0–2	Maccabi Haifa	Tel Aviv
20:45	Cohen (yellow card) 15'	Report	Lavi 53'; Menahem 62'; Haziza (yellow card) 76'; Wildschut (yellow card) 88'	Stadium: Bloomfield Stadium; Attendance: 1,350; Referee: Idan Leiba

20 March 2021 26	Maccabi Haifa	2–0	Maccabi Netanya	Haifa
19:15	Meir 7'; Lavi (yellow card) 59'; Rukavytsya 62'	Report	Šehović (yellow card) 21'; Kanichowsky (yellow card) 22'	Stadium: Sammy Ofer Stadium; Attendance: 5,000; Referee: Aviad Shiloach

==== Results overview ====
Win Draw Loss

Opposition	Home score	Away score
Beitar Jerusalem	2–0	3–0
Bnei Sakhnin	3–0	3–0
Bnei Yehuda Tel Aviv	3–0	2-0
F.C. Ashdod	2–1	0-1
Hapoel Be'er Sheva	3–1	1-1
Hapoel Hadera	1-0	2–1
Hapoel Haifa	2-0	1-2
Hapoel Kfar Saba	3–0	2-3
Hapoel Tel Aviv	1–0	2–1
Ironi Kiryat Shmona	4-2	3–0
Maccabi Netanya	2–0	2-0
Maccabi Petah Tikva	0-2	2-1
Maccabi Tel Aviv	2–2	1-2

==== Regular season table ====
Pos	Team	Pld	W	D	L	GF	GA	GD	Pts	Qualification or relegation
1	Maccabi Haifa	26	19	2	5	52	20	+32	59	Qualification for the Championship round
2	Maccabi Tel Aviv	26	17	7	2	48	21	+27	58	Qualification for the Championship round
3	F.C. Ashdod	26	13	4	9	37	25	+12	43	Qualification for the Championship round
4	Ironi Kiryat Shmona	26	11	5	10	26	28	−2	38	Qualification for the Championship round
5	Hapoel Be'er Sheva	26	9	10	7	31	29	+2	37	Qualification for the Championship round

Source: Soccerway
Rules for classification: 1) Points; 2) Goal difference; 3) Matches won; 4) Goals scored; 5) Head-to-head points; 6) Head-to-head goal difference; 7) Head-to-head goals scored; 8) Play-off.

=== Play-off ===
3 April 2020 27	Maccabi Haifa	1–1	Maccabi Petah Tikva	Haifa
19:50	Chery 19'; Mabouka (yellow card) 76'; Rodríguez (yellow card) 90+6'	Report	Abada 50'; Yanko (yellow card) 68'; Tomer Levy (yellow card) 75'	Stadium: Sammy Ofer Stadium; Attendance: 5,000; Referee: Erez Papir

6 April 2020 28	Maccabi Haifa	1–1	Maccabi Tel Aviv	Haifa
20:00	Planić 18'; Lavi (yellow card) 19'; Atzili (yellow card) 54'; Chery (yellow card) 90+4'	Report	Geraldes (yellow card) 13'; Guerrero 50', (yellow card) 50'; Blackman (yellow card) 74' (yellow-red card) 76'; Kandil (yellow card) 87'	Stadium: Sammy Ofer Stadium; Attendance: 5,000; Referee: Roi Reinshreiber

12 April 2020 29	F.C. Ashdod	0–3	Maccabi Haifa	Ashdod
20:30	Gordana (penalty missed) 35	Report	Atzili 4', 64', (yellow card) 74'; Haziza (yellow card) 31'; Ashkenazi 80'	Stadium: Yud-Alef Stadium; Attendance: 2,434; Referee: Gal Leibovich

17 April 2020 30	Maccabi Haifa	4–0	Ironi Kiryat Shmona	Haifa
20:30	Donyoh 8'; Chery 42'; Awaed 54'; Atzili 76'; Maor Levi (yellow card) 90+1'	Report	Touray (yellow card) 39'; Elo (yellow card) 39'; Mohammed Shaker (yellow card) 45'	Stadium: Sammy Ofer Stadium; Attendance: 10,000; Referee: Igal Frid

26 April 2020 31	Hapoel Be'er Sheva	1–1	Maccabi Haifa	Be'er Sheva
20:30	Acolatse (yellow card) 3'; Josué (yellow card) 20'; Yehezkel 23', (yellow card) 70'; Bareiro (yellow card) 50'; Goldberg (yellow card) 81'	Report	Rodríguez (yellow card) 20'; Planić (yellow card) 44'; Chery 56'; Menahem (yellow card) 57'; Abu Fani (yellow card) 61'; Awaed (yellow card) 62'	Stadium: Turner Stadium; Attendance: 5,175; Referee: Liran Liany

1 May 2021 32	Maccabi Petah Tikva	1–2	Maccabi Haifa	Petah Tikva
20:30	Sabag (yellow card) 16', (penalty missed) 30; Ferrier (yellow card) 20'; Inbrum (yellow card) 81'; Menahem 88' (o.g.)	Report	Lavi 18'; Atzili (yellow card) 44'; Planić 49'; Arad (yellow card) 67'	Stadium: HaMoshava Stadium; Attendance: 5,000; Referee: Eli Hacmon

9 May 2021 33	Maccabi Tel Aviv	2–2	Maccabi Haifa	Tel Aviv
20:30	Lavi 6' (o.g.); Pešić 17'; Glazer (yellow card) 45+12'; Yeini (yellow card) 67'	Report	Donyoh 36'; Chery 39'; Abu Fani (yellow card) 57'	Stadium: Bloomfield Stadium; Attendance: 22,913; Referee: Eitan Shmuelevic

23 May 2021 34	Maccabi Haifa	2–0	F.C. Ashdod	Haifa
21:00	Haziza (yellow card) 5'; Lavi (yellow card) 31'; Rukavytsya 39'; Donyoh (yellow card) 65', (goal) 75'	Report	Ben Zaken (yellow card) 31'; Safouri (yellow card) 54'; Firas Abu Akel (yellow card) 60'; Gordana (yellow card) 80'	Stadium: Sammy Ofer Stadium; Attendance: 26,875; Referee: Orel Grinfeld
Note: Originally scheduled for 17 May 2021 due to the 2021 Israel–Palestine crisis The league was postponed indefinitely.

26 May 2021 35	Ironi Kiryat Shmona	1-1	Maccabi Haifa	Kiryat Shmona
20:30	Eugene Ansah (yellow card) 13'; Lúcio (yellow card) 74'; Mike Amanga 90+3'	Report	Godsway Donyoh 74'; Arad (yellow card) 74'	Stadium: Municipal Stadium; Attendance: 5,000; Referee: Roi Reinshreiber
Note: originally scheduled for 22 May 2021 due to the 2021 Israel–Palestine crisis The league was postponed indefinitely.

30 May 2021 36	Maccabi Haifa	3-2	Hapoel Be'er Sheva	Haifa
20:30	Atzili 14' (pen.); Rukavytsya 35', (yellow card) 40'; Chery 45' (pen.); Mabouka (yellow card) 67'	[ Report]	Meli (yellow card) 31'; Kabha (yellow card) 45'; Yosefi (yellow card) 53', (goal) 57'; Rosa 80'	Stadium: Sammy Ofer Stadium; Attendance: 30,000; Referee: Orel Grinfeld
Note: originally scheduled for 25 May 2021 due to the 2021 Israel–Palestine crisis The league was postponed indefinitely.

=== Championship round table ===
Pos	Team	Pld	W	D	L	GF	GA	GD	Pts	Qualification	MHA	MTA	ASH	HBS	MPT	IKS
1	Maccabi Haifa (C)	36	24	7	5	72	29	+43	79	Qualification for the Champions League first qualifying round	—	1–1	2–0	3–2	1–1	4–0
2	Maccabi Tel Aviv	36	21	12	3	65	33	+32	75	Qualification for the Europa Conference League second qualifying round (Note: Since the 2020–21 Israel State Cup winners, Maccabi Tel Aviv, qualified for the Europa Conference League via league position, the last Europa Conference League berth was awarded to the fourth-placed team.)	2–2	—	1–1	2–1	3–1	2–2
3	F.C. Ashdod	36	15	9	12	48	39	+9	54	Qualification for the Europa Conference League second qualifying round	0–3	1–2	—	2–2	0–0	1–1
4	Hapoel Be'er Sheva	36	11	15	10	45	43	+2	48	Qualification for the Europa Conference League second qualifying round	1–1	1–1	1–2	—	2–0	3–2
5	Maccabi Petah Tikva	36	13	7	16	32	38	−6	46		1–2	0–3	1–3	0–0	—	2–0
6	Ironi Kiryat Shmona	36	12	10	14	37	45	−8	46		1–1	2–0	1–1	1–1	1–2	—

Source: Soccerway
Rules for classification: 1) Points; 2) Goal difference; 3) Matches won; 4) Goals scored; 5) Head-to-head points; 6) Head-to-head goal difference; 7) Head-to-head goals scored; 8) Play-off.
(C) Champions

==== Results overview ====
Win Draw Loss

Opposition	Home score	Away score
F.C. Ashdod	2-0	3-0
Hapoel Be'er Sheva	3-2	1-1
Ironi Kiryat Shmona	4-0	1–1
Maccabi Tel Aviv	1-1	2-2
Maccabi Petah Tikva	1–1	2-1

=== Results summary ===
Overall								Home						Away					
Pld	W	D	L	GF	GA	GD	Pts	W	D	L	GF	GA	GD	W	D	L	GF	GA	GD
36	24	7	5	72	29	+43	79	14	3	1	39	12	+27	10	4	4	33	17	+16

Last updated: 31 May 2021.
Source: Competitive matches

=== Results by round ===
Round	1	2	3	4	5	6	7	8	9	10	11	12	13	14	15	16	17	18	19	20	21	22	23	24	25	26	27	28	29	30	31	32	33	34	35	36
Ground	A	H	A	H	A	H	A	H	A	H	A	H	A	H	A	H	A	H	A	H	A	H	A	H	A	H	H	H	A	H	A	A	A	H	A	H
Result	W	W	W	D	L	W	L	W	W	W	W	W	W	W	D	W	L	W	L	W	W	W	W	L	W	W	D	D	W	W	D	W	D	W	D	W
Position	5	2	2	3	4	1	4	3	1	1	1	1	1	1	1	1	1	1	1	1	1	1	1	2	2	1	2	2	2	1	1	1	1	1	1	1

Updated to match(es) played on 31 May 2021. Source: Competitive Matches
A = Away; H = Home; W = Win; D = Draw; L = Loss

== State Cup ==
=== Round of 32 ===
20 February 2021 Round of 32	Maccabi Haifa	2–1	Hapoel Umm al-Fahm	Haifa
20:30	Lavi 11'; Donyoh 90'	Report	Levan Kutalia 45'; Joof Gaira (yellow card) 75'; Ahmed Younes (yellow card) 90+3'	Stadium: Sammy Ofer Stadium; Attendance: 0 Referee: Gal Leibovitz

=== Round of 16 ===
17 March 2021 Round of 16	Maccabi Haifa	2–1	Maccabi Petah Tikva	Haifa
20:45	Chery (yellow card) 25'; Atzili 64', 83', (yellow card) 71'; Planić (yellow card) 90+4'	Report	Cooper 42' (pen.), (yellow card) 58'; Amit Meir (yellow card) 80'	Stadium: Sammy Ofer Stadium; Attendance: 1,500; Referee: Daniel Bar Natan

=== Quarter-final ===
22 April 2021 Quarter final	Maccabi Haifa	4–1	Hapoel Afula	Haifa
20:30	Awaed 41', 74', (yellow card) 83'; Haziza (yellow card) 65', (goal) 69' (pen.); Chery (yellow card) 73'; Wildschut 90+1'	Report	Ben David (yellow card) 45'; Eran Azrad (yellow card) 68'; Buzorgi 87'	Stadium: Sammy Ofer Stadium; Attendance: 8,000; Referee: Snir Levi

=== Semi-final ===
20 May 2021 Semi final	Maccabi Haifa	0–2	Maccabi Tel Aviv	Haifa
21:00	Arad (yellow card) 22'; Abu Fani (yellow card) 37'; Atzili (yellow card) 45'; Menahem (yellow card) 70'	Report	Shechter 51', 59'	Stadium: Sammy Ofer Stadium; Attendance: 0 (Note: due to the 2021 Israel–Palestine crisis played Behind closed doors); Referee: Liran Liany
Note: originally scheduled for 12 May 2021 due to the 2021 Israel–Palestine crisis The league was postponed indefinitely.

== Toto Cup ==
=== Group stage ===
9 August 2020 1	Ironi Kiryat Shmona	0–1	Maccabi Haifa	Kiryat Shmona
21:00		Report	Arad 9'	Stadium: Municipal Stadium; Attendance: 0 Referee: Aviad Shiloach

12 August 2020 2	Bnei Sakhnin	1–0	Maccabi Haifa	Sakhnin
21:00	Osama Khalaila 26'; Hassan Hilo (yellow card) 28'; Jaber (yellow card) 36'; Kanadil (yellow card) 82'	Report	Haziza (yellow card) 74'; Abu Fani (yellow card) 76'	Stadium: Doha Stadium; Attendance: 0 Referee: Erez Papir

16 August 2020 3	Maccabi Haifa	1–0	Hapoel Haifa	Haifa
20:15	Abu Fani (yellow card) 3'; Menahem (yellow card) 44'; Rukavytsya 51'; Haziza (yellow card) 67'	Report		Stadium: Sammy Ofer Stadium; Attendance: 0 Referee: Shalom Ben Avraham

Pos	Team	Pld	W	D	L	GF	GA	GD	Pts	Qualification or relegation	BSK	MHA	IKS	HHA
1	Bnei Sakhnin	3	2	1	0	4	1	+3	7	Possible Final based on other 1st places	—	1–0		
2	Maccabi Haifa	3	2	0	1	2	1	+1	6	Possible 5–6th match based on other 2nd places		—		1–0
3	Ironi Kiryat Shmona	3	0	2	1	3	4	−1	2	Possible 9–10th match based on other 3rd places	1–1	0–1	—	
4	Hapoel Haifa	3	0	1	2	2	5	−3	1	Possible 11–12th match based on other 4th places	0–2		2–2	—

Updated to match(es) played on unknown. Source: Israel Football Association
Rules for classification: 1) points; 2) goal difference; 3) goals for;

=== 5-6th classification match ===
22 August 2020	Hapoel Be'er Sheva	1–0	Maccabi Haifa	Jerusalem
19:00	Dadia (yellow card) 20'; Sallalich 58'	[ Report]	Menahem (yellow card) 20'	Stadium: Teddy Stadium; Attendance: 0 Referee: David Fuxman

== UEFA Europa League ==
9 September 2020 1Q	Maccabi Haifa (Israel)	3–1	(Bosnia and Herzegovina) Željezničar	Haifa
20:00	Chery 39'; Rukavytsya 59'; Ashkenazi 66'	Report	Lendrić 35'; Alispahić (yellow card) 53'; Hajdarević (yellow card) 58'; Stevanović (yellow card) 63'; Aleksandar Kosorić (yellow card) 82'; Juričić (yellow card) 87'; Blažević (yellow card) 90+5'	Stadium: Sammy Ofer Stadium; Attendance: 0 Referee: (Denmark) Jörgen Burchardt

17 September 2020 2Q	Maccabi Haifa (Israel)	2–1	(Kazakhstan) FC Kairat	Haifa
20:00	Ashkenazi 31'; Menahem (yellow card) 42'; Rukavytsya 72'; Mabouka (yellow card) 78'; Abu Fani (yellow card) 81'; Cohen (yellow card) 90+1'	Report	Alykulov (yellow card) 2'; Góralski (yellow card) 36'; Love 45'	Stadium: Sammy Ofer Stadium; Attendance: 0 Referee: (Denmark) Mads-Kristoffer Kristoffersen

24 September 2020 3Q	FC Rostov (Russia)	1–2	(Israel) Maccabi Haifa	Rostov-on-Don
19:30	Shomurodov 9'; Glebov (red card) 69'	Report	Rukavytsya 20'; Planić (yellow card) 45'; Abu Fani 60'; Arad (yellow card) 88'	Stadium: Rostov Arena; Attendance: 0 Referee: (Czech Republic) Petr Ardeleánu

1 October 2020 PO	Tottenham Hotspur (England)	7–2	(Israel) Maccabi Haifa	London
22:00	Kane 2', 56' (pen.), 74'; Moura 21'; Lo Celso 36', 39'; Alli 90+1' (pen.)	Report	Chery 17'; Rukavytsya 52' (pen.)	Stadium: Tottenham Hotspur Stadium; Attendance: 0 Referee: (France) Ruddy Buquet

== Statistics ==
=== Squad statistics ===
			Ligat HaAl					State Cup					Toto Cup					UEFA Europa League					Total				
Nation	No.	Name		GS	Min.	Goal	Assist		GS	Min.	Goal	Assist		GS	Min.	Goal	Assist		GS	Min.	Goal	Assist		GS	Min.	Goal	Assist
Goalkeepers
(United States) (Israel)	44	Josh Cohen	32	32	3,156	0	1	4	4	382	0	0	4	4	383	0	0	4	4	383	0	0	44	44	4,304	0	1
(Israel)	52	Omri Glazer	4	4	394	0	0	0	0	0	0	0	0	0	0	0	0	0	0	0	0	0	4	4	394	0	0
(Israel)	77	Roee Fucs	0	0	0	0	0	0	0	0	0	0	0	0	0	0	0	0	0	0	0	0	0	0	0	0	0
Defenders
(Serbia)	5	Bogdan Planić	31	31	2,954	4	1	2	2	193	0	0	0	0	0	0	0	3	2	209	0	0	36	35	3,356	4	1
(Israel)	12	Sun Menahem	35	31	3,001	4	4	2	2	193	0	0	3	3	262	0	0	4	4	383	0	1	44	40	3,803	4	5
(Israel)	15	Ofri Arad	32	30	3,052	1	0	4	4	331	0	0	3	3	287	1	0	4	4	362	0	0	43	41	4,032	2	0
(Israel)	17	Taleb Tawatha	14	5	467	0	0	1	1	56	0	0	0	0	0	0	0	0	0	0	0	0	15	6	603	0	0
(Israel)	21	Ayid Habshi	10	8	722	0	0	0	0	0	0	0	4	4	366	0	0	4	4	383	0	0	18	16	1,471	0	0
(Israel)	25	Raz Meir	27	21	2,101	1	3	3	3	253	0	0	2	1	108	0	0	0	0	0	0	0	32	25	2,462	1	3
(Cameroon)	26	Ernest Mabouka	18	15	1,498	0	3	1	1	94	0	1	3	3	275	0	0	4	4	383	0	1	28	23	2,319	0	5
(Israel)	35	Rony Laufer	0	0	0	0	0	0	0	0	0	0	0	0	0	0	0	0	0	0	0	0	0	0	0	0	0
(Israel)	55	Rami Gershon	11	4	566	0	0	4	3	336	0	0	2	1	113	0	0	0	0	0	0	0	17	8	1,015	0	0
Midfielders
(Israel)	6	Neta Lavi	34	34	3,226	2	2	4	3	313	1	1	2	2	163	0	0	4	4	383	0	0	44	43	4,085	3	3
(Netherlands)	7	Yanic Wildschut	22	5	734	1	2	3	2	137	1	0	4	1	197	0	2	2	150	0	0	0	31	10	1,218	2	2
(Israel)	8	Dolev Haziza	32	31	2,834	8	7	3	2	234	0	2	4	3	361	0	1	4	2	261	0	0	43	38	3,690	8	11
(Israel)	9	Omer Atzili	21	18	1,598	4	10	3	2	267	2	0	0	0	0	0	0	0	0	0	0	0	24	20	1,865	6	10
(Suriname) (Netherlands)	10	Tjaronn Chery	34	30	2,660	12	5	3	3	279	0	1	4	3	250	0	0	4	4	383	2	0	45	40	3,572	14	6
(Spain)	14	José Rodríguez	29	26	2,326	1	1	4	3	250	0	2	0	0	0	0	0	3	0	32	0	0	36	29	2,608	1	3
(Israel)	16	Mohammad Abu Fani	34	31	2,634	2	1	4	2	251	0	0	4	3	315	0	0	4	4	327	1	0	46	40	3,527	3	1
(Israel)	18	Yuval Ashkenazi	23	4	649	1	2	2	1	70	0	0	4	4	327	0	0	4	2	167	2	0	33	11	1,213	3	2
(Israel)	32	Nehorai Ifrach	2	0	44	0	0	1	0	20	0	0	0	0	0	0	0	0	0	0	0	0	3	0	64	0	0
(Israel)	33	Maor Levi	22	0	394	0	1	2	2	141	0	0	2	0	38	0	0	0	0	0	0	0	26	2	573	0	1
Forwards
(Ghana)	11	Godsway Donyoh	28	10	1,178	8	1	3	2	191	1	0	0	0	0	0	0	1	0	24	0	0	32	12	1,393	9	1
(Australia) (Israel)	13	Nikita Rukavytsya	28	25	1,989	19	2	3	2	106	0	0	3	3	188	1	0	4	4	347	4	3	38	34	2,630	24	6
(Israel)	19	Stav Nahmani	6	0	156	0	0	1	0	20	0	0	2	1	78	0	0	2	0	24	0	0	11	1	207	0	0
(Israel)	22	Mohammed Awaed	11	1	280	1	0	4	1	154	2	0	2	1	96	0	1	0	0	0	0	0	17	3	530	3	0
Players who have made an appearance this season but have left the club
(Israel)	-	Yarden Shua	2	2	81	0	0	0	0	0	0	0	4	2	272	0	0	1	0	26	0	0	7	2	379	0	0
(The Gambia)	-	Saikou Touray	2	0	17	0	0	0	0	0	0	0	4	1	93	1	0	0	0	0	0	0	6	1	110	0	0
(Israel)	-	Ihab Abu Alshikh	11	1	205	0	0	0	0	0	0	0	0	0	0	0	0	0	0	0	0	0	11	1	205	0	0
(Israel)	-	Yahav Gurfinkel	0	0	0	0	0	0	0	0	0	0	2	1	93	0	0	0	0	0	0	0	2	1	93	0	0
(Israel)	-	Timothy Muzie	4	0	33	0	0	0	0	0	0	0	2	0	27	0	0	0	0	0	0	0	6	0	60	0	0

=== Goals ===
Rank	Player	Position	Ligat HaAl	State Cup	Toto Cup	Europa League	Total
1	(Australia) (Israel) Nikita Rukavytsya	FW	19	0	1	4	24
2	(Suriname) (Netherlands) Tjaronn Chery	MF	12	0	0	2	14
3	(Israel) Dolev Haziza	MF	8	1	0	0	9
4	(Ghana) Godsway Donyoh	FW	8	1	0	0	9
5	(Israel) Omer Atzili	MF	4	2	0	0	6
6	(Israel) Sun Menahem	DF	4	0	0	0	4
6	(Serbia) Bogdan Planić	DF	4	0	0	0	4
8	(Israel) Neta Lavi	MF	2	1	0	0	3
8	(Israel) Mohammad Abu Fani	MF	2	0	0	1	3
8	(Israel) Yuval Ashkenazi	MF	1	0	0	2	3
8	(Israel) Mohammed Awaed	FW	1	2	0	0	3
11	(Israel) Ofri Arad	DF	1	0	1	0	2
11	(Netherlands) Yanic Wildschut	MF	1	1	0	0	2
13	(Spain) José Rodríguez	MF	1	0	0	0	1
13	(Israel) Raz Meir	DF	1	0	0	0	1
Own goals			3	0	0	0	3

=== Clean sheets ===
Rank	Pos.	No.	Name	Ligat HaAl	State Cup	Toto Cup	Europa League	Total
1	GK	44	(United States) (Israel) Josh Cohen	16		2		18

=== Disciplinary record for Ligat Ha'Al and State Cup ===
No.	Pos	Nat	Name	Ligat Ha'Al			State Cup			Total		
No.	Pos	Nat	Name	Booked	(yellow card) (yellow-red card)	Sent off (straight red)	Booked	(yellow card) (yellow-red card)	Sent off (straight red)	Booked	(yellow card) (yellow-red card)	Sent off (straight red)
16	MF	(Israel)	Mohammad Abu Fani	9			1			10		
8	MF	(Israel)	Dolev Haziza	9			1			10		
14	MF	(Spain)	José Rodríguez	9						9		
6	MF	(Israel)	Neta Lavi	9						9		
15	DF	(Israel)	Ofri Arad	8			1			9		
12	DF	(Israel)	Sun Menahem	6			1			7		
9	MF	(Israel)	Omer Atzili	5			2			7		
5	DF	(Serbia)	Bogdan Planić	5			1			6		
10	MF	(Suriname) (Netherlands)	Tjaronn Chery	4			2			6		
26	DF	(Cameroon)	Ernest Mabouka	4						4		
44	GK	(United States) (Israel)	Josh Cohen	3						3		
7	MF	(Netherlands)	Yanic Wildschut	3						3		
13	FW	(Australia) (Israel)	Nikita Rukavytsya	3						3		
21	DF	(Israel)	Ayid Habshi	2						2		
33	MF	(Israel)	Maor Levi	2						2		
11	FW	(Ghana)	Godsway Donyoh	2						2		
22	FW	(Israel)	Mohammed Awaed	1			1			2		
25	DF	(Israel)	Raz Meir	1						1		
18	MF	(Israel)	Yuval Ashkenazi	1						1		

=== Suspensions ===
Player	Date Received	Offence	Length of suspension		
Neta Lavi	15 December 2020	(yellow card) 72' vs Hapoel Tel Aviv (H)	1 Match	Bnei Yehuda (H)	22 December 2020
Ofri Arad	19 December 2020	(yellow card) 90+6' vs Maccabi Petah Tikva (H)	1 Match	Maccabi Netanya (A)	26 December 2020
Mohammad Abu Fani	2 January 2021	(yellow card) 38' vs Hapoel Hadera (H)	1 Match	Bnei Sakhnin (H)	23 January 2021
José Rodríguez	27 January 2021	(yellow card) 45' vs Maccabi Tel Aviv (A)	1 Match	F.C. Ashdod (H)	6 February 2021
Dolev Haziza	10 February 2021	(yellow card) 90+1' vs Hapoel Haifa (H)	1 Match	Hapoel Umm al-Fahm (H)	20 February 2021
Dolev Haziza	17 February 2021		3 Match	Ironi Kiryat Shmona (H); Hapoel Tel Aviv (A); Maccabi Petah Tikva (H)	27 February 2021; 3 March 2021; 6 March 2021
Ayid Habshi	17 February 2021		3 Match	Hapoel Umm al-Fahm (H); Ironi Kiryat Shmona (H); Hapoel Tel Aviv (A)	20 February 2021; 27 February 2021; 3 March 2021
Sun Menahem	17 February 2021		2 Match	Hapoel Umm al-Fahm (H); Ironi Kiryat Shmona (H)	20 February 2021; 27 February 2021
Bogdan Planić	17 February 2021		1 Match	Hapoel Umm al-Fahm (H)	20 February 2021
Sun Menahem	6 March 2021	(yellow card) 76' Maccabi Petah Tikva (H)	1 Match	Maccabi Petah Tikva (H)	17 March 2021
Bogdan Planić	17 March 2021	(yellow card) 90+4' Maccabi Petah Tikva (H)	1 Match	Maccabi Petah Tikva (H)	3 April 2021
Omer Atzili	12 April 2021	(yellow card) 74' F.C. Ashdod (A)	1 Match	Hapoel Afula (H)	22 April 2021
Dolev Haziza	22 April 2021	(yellow card) 65' Hapoel Afula (H)	1 Match	Maccabi Petah Tikva (A)	1 May 2021
Tjaronn Chery	22 April 2021	(yellow card) 73' Hapoel Afula (H)	1 Match	Maccabi Petah Tikva (A)	1 May 2021
José Rodríguez	26 April 2021	(yellow card) 20' Hapoel Be'er Sheva (A)	1 Match	Maccabi Tel Aviv (A)	9 May 2021
Mohammad Abu Fani	9 May 2021	(yellow card) 57' vs Maccabi Tel Aviv (A)	1 Match	F.C. Ashdod (H)	23 May 2021
Neta Lavi	23 May 2021	(yellow card) 31' vs F.C. Ashdod (H)	1 Match	Hapoel Be'er Sheva (H)	30 May 2021

=== Penalties ===
Date	Penalty Taker	Scored	Opponent	Competition
1 October 2020	(Australia) (Israel) Nikita Rukavytsya	Yes	Tottenham Hotspur	Europa League
7 November 2020	(Australia) (Israel) Nikita Rukavytsya	Yes	F.C. Ashdod	Liga Ha`Al
21 November 2020	(Australia) (Israel) Nikita Rukavytsya	Yes	Hapoel Haifa	Liga Ha`Al
24 November 2020	(Australia) (Israel) Nikita Rukavytsya	No	Hapoel Kfar Saba	Liga Ha`Al
30 November 2020	(Australia) (Israel) Nikita Rukavytsya	No	Beitar Jerusalem	Liga Ha`Al
5 December 2020	(Israel) Dolev Haziza	Yes	Ironi Kiryat Shmona	Liga Ha`Al
19 December 2020	(Israel) Mohammad Abu Fani	No	Maccabi Petah Tikva	Liga Ha`Al
22 December 2020	(Suriname) (Netherlands) Tjaronn Chery	Yes	Bnei Yehuda Tel Aviv	Ligat Ha'Al
23 January 2021	(Australia) (Israel) Nikita Rukavytsya	Yes	Bnei Sakhnin	Liga Ha`Al
23 January 2021	(Israel) Dolev Haziza	Yes	Bnei Sakhnin	Liga Ha`Al
22 April 2021	(Israel) Dolev Haziza	Yes	Hapoel Afula	State Cup
30 May 2021	(Israel) Omer Atzili	Yes	Hapoel Be'er Sheva	Liga Ha`Al
30 May 2021	(Suriname) (Netherlands) Tjaronn Chery	Yes	Hapoel Be'er Sheva	Liga Ha`Al

=== Overall ===
	Total	Home	Away	Natural
Games played	48	25	22	1
Games won	32	20	12	-
Games drawn	7	3	4	-
Games lost	9	1	7	1
Biggest win	4-0 vs Ironi Kiryat Shmona	4-0 vs Ironi Kiryat Shmona	3-0 vs Ironi Kiryat Shmona; 3-0 vs Bnei Sakhnin; 3-0 vs Beitar Jerusalem; 3-0 vs F.C. Ashdod	-
Biggest loss	2-7 vs Tottenham Hotspur	0-2 vs Maccabi Petah Tikva	2-7 vs Tottenham Hotspur	0-2 vs Maccabi Tel Aviv
Biggest win (League)	4-0 vs Ironi Kiryat Shmona	4-0 vs Ironi Kiryat Shmona	3-0 vs Ironi Kiryat Shmona; 3-0 vs Bnei Sakhnin; 3-0 vs Beitar Jerusalem; 3-0 vs F.C. Ashdod	
Biggest loss (League)	0-2 vs Maccabi Petah Tikva	0-2 vs Maccabi Petah Tikva	1-2 vs Hapeol Haifa; 2-3 vs Hapoel Kfar Saba; 1-2 vs Maccabi Tel Aviv; 0-1 vs F.C. Ashdod	
Biggest win (Cup)	4-1 vs Hapoel Afula	4-1 vs Hapoel Afula		
Biggest loss (Cup)	0-2 vs Maccabi Tel Aviv			0-2 vs Maccabi Tel Aviv
Biggest win (Toto)	1-0 vs Ironi Kiryat Shmona; 1-0 vs Hapoel Haifa	1-0 vs Hapoel Haifa	1-0 vs Ironi Kiryat Shmona	
Biggest loss (Toto)	0-1 vs Bnei Sakhnin; 0-1 vs Hapoel Be'er Sheva		0-1 vs Bnei Sakhnin; 0-1 vs Hapoel Be'er Sheva	
Biggest win (Europe)	3-1 vs FK Željezničar	3-1 vs FK Željezničar	2-1 vs FC Rostov	
Biggest loss (Europe)	2-7 vs Tottenham Hotspur		2-7 vs Tottenham Hotspur	
Goals scored	91	53	38	0
Goals conceded	46	17	27	2
Goal difference	+45	+36	+11	-2
Clean sheets	18	12	6	-
Average GF per game	1.9	2.12	1.73	0
Average GA per game	0.96	0.68	1.18	2
Yellow cards	107	64	39	4
Red cards	0	0	0	0
Most appearances	(Israel) Mohammad Abu Fani (46)			
Most minutes played	(United States) (Israel) Josh Cohen (4,304)			
Most goals	(Australia) (Israel) Nikita Rukavytsya (24)			
Most Assist	(Israel) Dolev Haziza (11)			
Penalties for	13	8	5	
Penalties against	9	2	7	
Penalties saved	4	1	3	
Winning rate	66.67%	80%	54.55%	0%

Last updated: Updated on 31 May 2021
Source: Competitive matches
