= Amit Cohen =

Israeli footballer

Personal information
- Date of birth: 22 July 1999 (age 27)
- Place of birth: Israel
- Height: 1.73 m (5 ft 8 in)
- Position: Goalkeeper

Team information
- Current team: Florida Atlantic Owls
- Number: 99

Youth career
- 2010–2015: Hapoel Petah Tikva
- 2013–2014: Youth Academy

College career
Years	Team	Apps	(Gls)
2020–2022	Florida Atlantic Owls	24	(0)

Senior career*
Years	Team	Apps	(Gls)
2016–2017	Youth Academy	21	(0)
2017–2018	Hapoel Ra'anana	19	(0)
2018–2019	ASA Tel Aviv	22	(0)

International career^{‡}
2017–2018	Israel U19	6	(0)
2019–	Israel	9	(0)
- * Club domestic league appearances and goals as of 23 June 2021 ‡ National team caps and goals as of 24 February 2022

Amit Cohen (Hebrew: עמית כהן; born 22 July 1999) is an Israeli footballer who plays as a goalkeeper for US college team Florida Atlantic Owls and the Israel women's national team.

== Biography ==
Cohen was raised in Eilat.

== Sports career ==
Cohen was capped for the Israel national team, appearing for the team during the 2019 FIFA Women's World Cup qualifying cycle.
