= Ido Levy (footballer) =

Israeli footballer

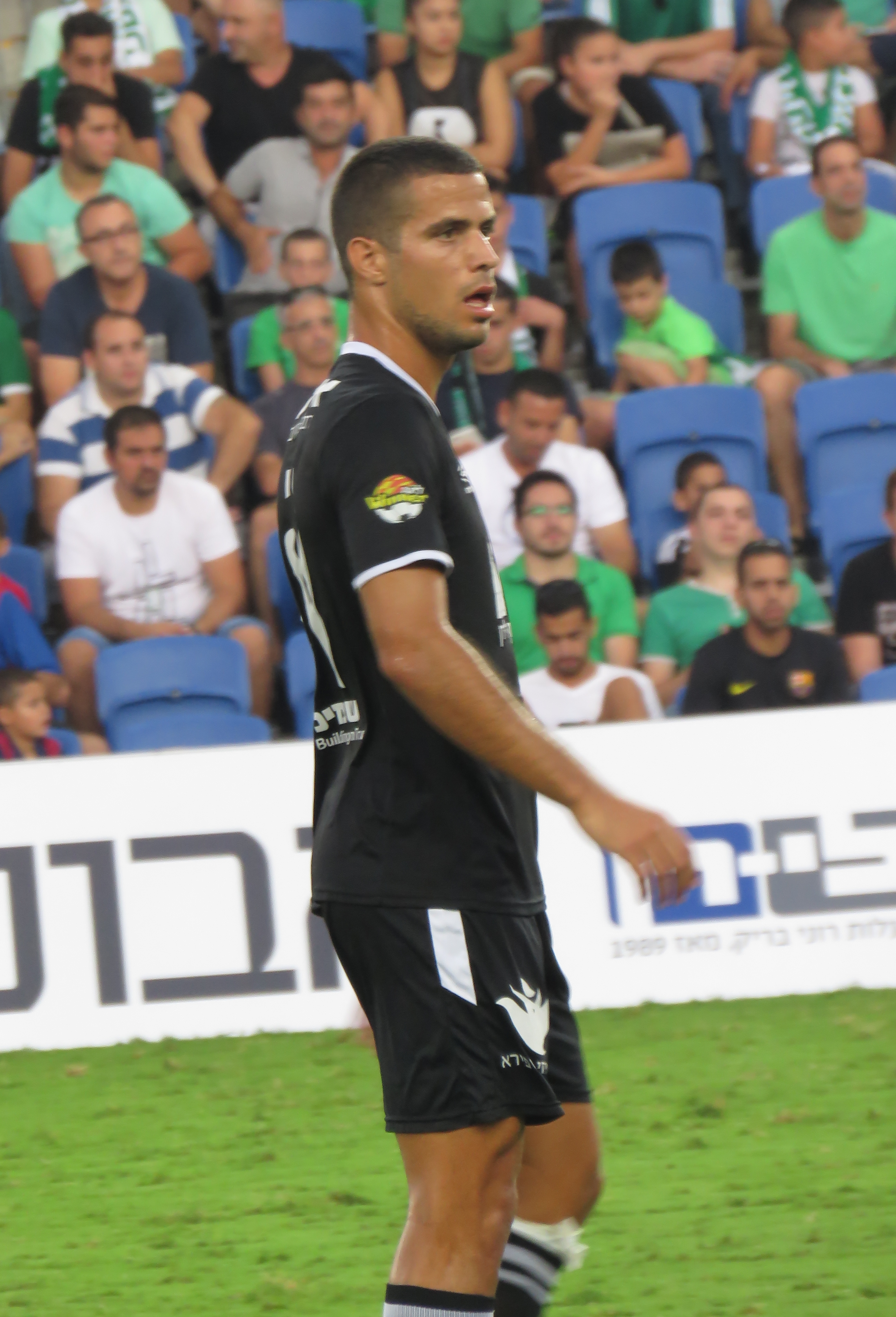
- Levy playing for Hapoel Ra'anana in 2015

Personal information
- Full name: Ido Levy
- Date of birth: 31 July 1990 (age 36)
- Place of birth: Hadera, Israel
- Position: Centre-back

Team information
- Current team: Hapoel Hadera
- Number: 5

Youth career
- Maccabi Netanya

Senior career*
Years	Team	Apps	(Gls)
2009–2015	Maccabi Netanya	86	(7)
2010–2011	→ Hapoel Herzliya (loan)	29	(2)
2015–2020	Hapoel Ra'anana	138	(4)
2020–2021	Hapoel Haifa	2	(0)
2021–2025	Hapoel Hadera	120	(3)

International career
2011–2013	Israel U21	12	(0)
- * Club domestic league appearances and goals

Ido Levy (Hebrew: עידו לוי; born 31 July 1990) is an Israeli former professional footballer who plays as a centre-back.

== Career statistics ==
As of 1 August 2020

Appearances and goals by club, season and competition
Club	Season	League		Cup		League Cup		Europe		Total		
Club	Season	Division	Apps	Goals	Apps	Goals	Apps	Goals	Apps	Goals	Apps	Goals
Maccabi Netanya	2008–09	Israeli Premier League	0	0	0	0	1	0	0	0	1	0
Maccabi Netanya	2009–10	Israeli Premier League	0	0	0	0	0	0	0	0	0	0
Hapoel Herzliya	2010–11	Liga Leumit	29	2	1	0	4	0	0	0	34	2
Maccabi Netanya	2011–12	Israeli Premier League	24	0	1	0	0	0	0	0	25	0
Maccabi Netanya	2012–13	Israeli Premier League	25	0	1	0	1	1	1	0	28	1
Maccabi Netanya	2013–14	Israeli Premier League	13	3	6	0	0	0	0	0	19	3
Maccabi Netanya	2014–15	Israeli Premier League	23	1	0	0	1	0	0	0	24	1
Hapoel Ra'anana	2015–16	Israeli Premier League	31	0	2	0	0	0	0	0	33	0
Hapoel Ra'anana	2016–17	Israeli Premier League	32	1	2	0	4	0	0	0	38	1
Hapoel Ra'anana	2017–18	Israeli Premier League	14	0	4	0	1	0	0	0	19	0
Hapoel Ra'anana	2018–19	Israeli Premier League	33	1	0	0	3	1	0	0	36	2
Hapoel Ra'anana	2019–20	Israeli Premier League	28	2	2	0	4	1	0	0	34	3
Hapoel Haifa	2020–21	Israeli Premier League	2	0	0	0	1	0	0	0	3	0
Hapoel Hadera	2020–21	Israeli Premier League	15	0	1	0	0	0	0	0	16	0
Hapoel Hadera	2021–22	Israeli Premier League	30	0	3	0	4	0	0	0	37	0
Career total			299	10	23	0	24	3	1	0	347	13

== Honours ==
- Liga Leumit
  - Winner (1): 2013–14
- Israel State Cup
  - Runner-up (1): 2013–14
