= Guy Mishpati =

Israeli footballer

Personal information
- Full name: Guy Mishpati
- Date of birth: 21 June 1990 (age 36)
- Place of birth: Rishon LeZion, Israel
- Position: Center back

Team information
- Current team: Hapoel Nir Ramat HaSharon
- Number: 14

Senior career*
Years	Team	Apps	(Gls)
2008–2012	Hapoel Rishon LeZion	82	(6)
2012–2014	Hapoel Petah Tikva	52	(0)
2014–2015	Hakoah Amidar Ramat Gan	18	(2)
2015	Hapoel Jerusalem	7	(0)
2015–2016	Hapoel Nir Ramat HaSharon	26	(0)
2016	Hapoel Baqa al-Gharbiyye	6	(0)
2016–2017	Maccabi Yavne	5	(0)
2017–2018	Hapoel Marmorek	31	(2)
2018–2022	Hapoel Haifa	67	(2)
2022–2023	Maccabi Jaffa	32	(0)
2023–2024	Hapoel Nir Ramat HaSharon	17	(0)
2024–2025	Maccabi Yavne	28	(5)
2025–	Hakoah Amidar Ramat Gan	0	(0)

International career
2008	Israel U19	8	(0)
- * Club domestic league appearances and goals as of 1 February 2025

Guy Mishpati (Hebrew: גיא משפתי; born 21 June 1990) is an Israeli footballer who plays as a defender for Hakoah Amidar Ramat Gan.
