= Sammy Ofer Stadium =

Football stadium in Haifa, Israel

Coordinates: 32°47′0″N 34°57′55″E

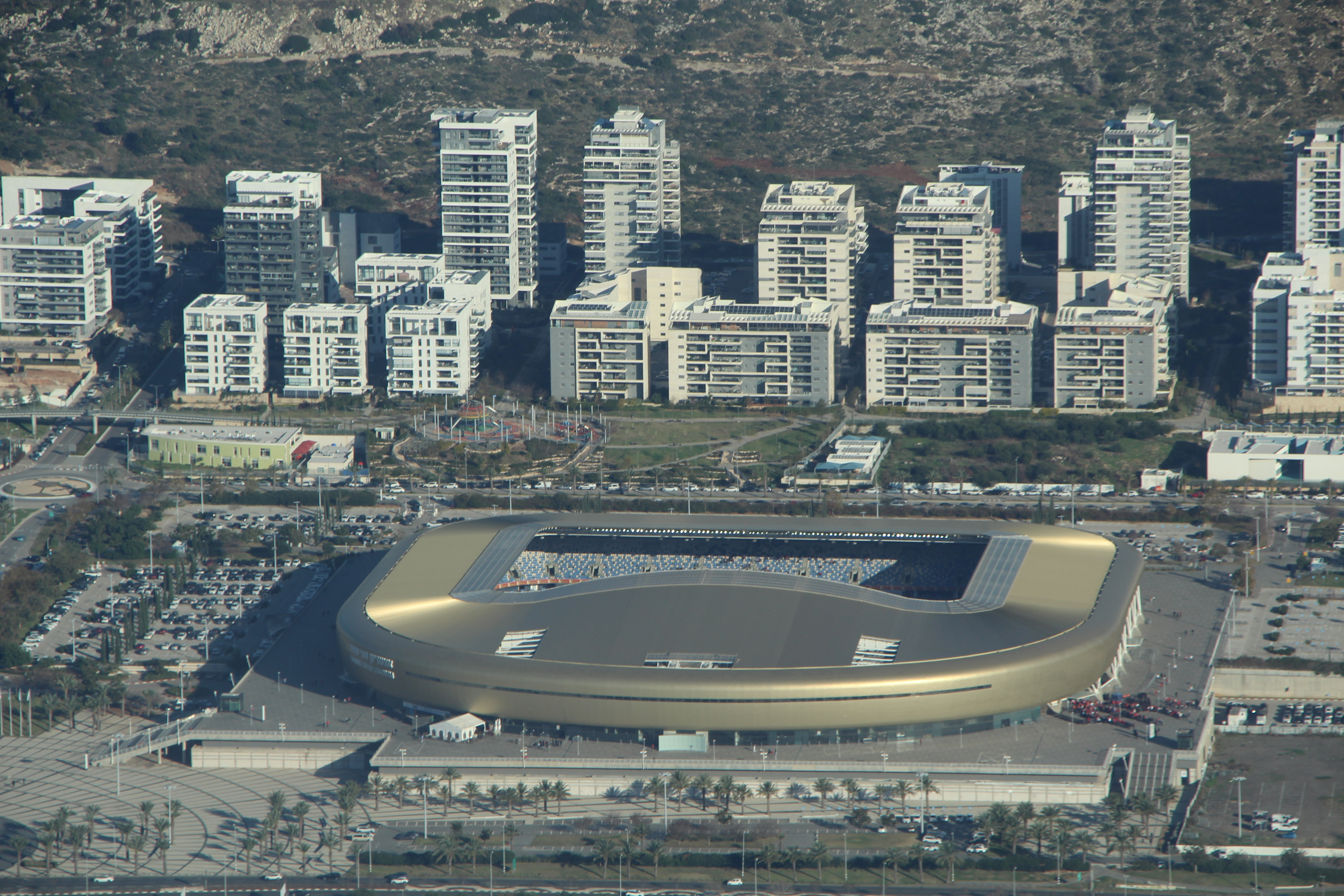
- UEFA
- Interactive map of Sammy Ofer Stadium
- Full name: The International Sammy Ofer Stadium
- Address: 2 Pinchas and Abraham Rotenberg Street
- Location: Haifa, Israel
- Owner: Haifa Municipality
- Operator: Haifa Municipality
- Capacity: 30,955
- Executive suites: 35
- Surface: Grass
- Scoreboard: LCD
- Record attendance: 30,464 (Maccabi Haifa vs Benfica Lisbon, 2 November 2022)
- Field size: 22,000 m^{2} (240,000 sq ft)
- Public transit: Coastal Railway Line at Haifa Hof HaCarmel

Construction
- Groundbreaking: 2009
- Opened: 27 August 2014
- Cost: ₪ 530 million
- Architect: KSS Design Group

Tenants
- Maccabi Haifa (2014–present); Hapoel Haifa (2014–present); Israel national football team (selected matches)

Website
- Sammy Ofer Stadium

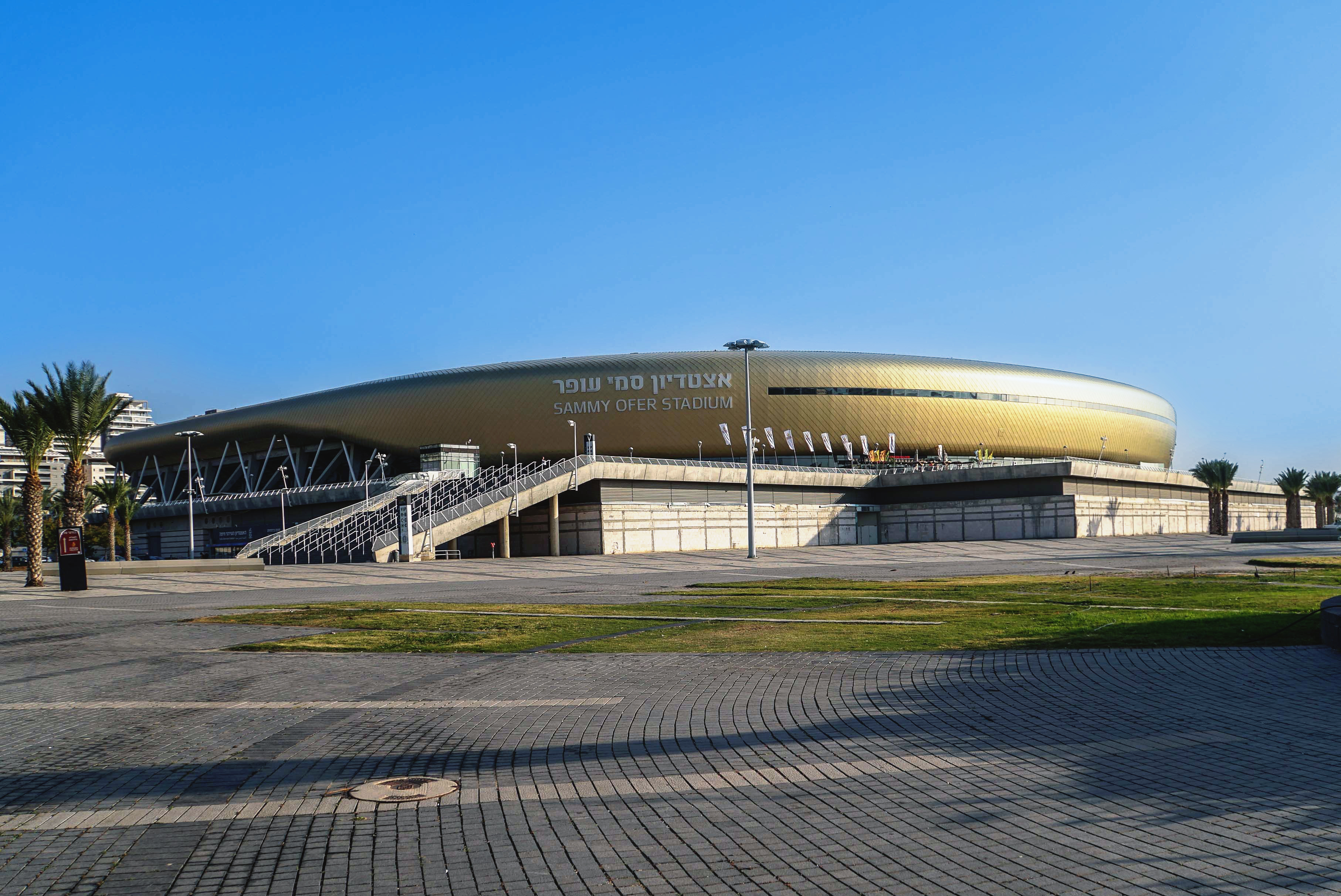
Sammy Ofer Stadium of the city of Haifa, Israel

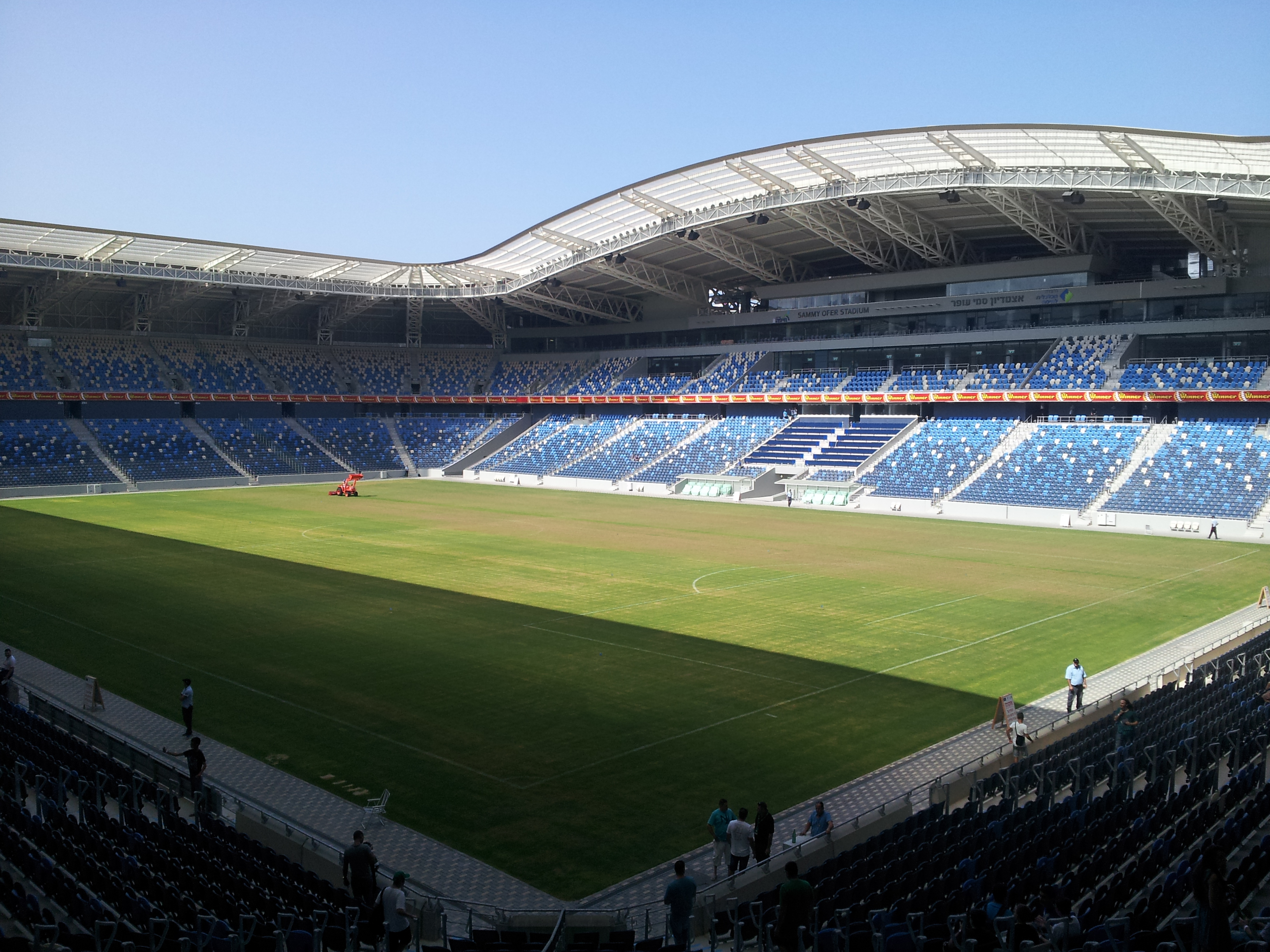
Sammy Ofer Stadium

Sammy Ofer Stadium (Hebrew: אצטדיון סמי עופר), also known as Haifa Municipal Stadium (האצטדיון העירוני חיפה), is a 30,950 seats multi-purpose stadium in Haifa, Israel. Construction began in late 2009 and was completed in 2014. The stadium was developed and built by the Haifa Economic Corporation, managed by Adv. Gal Peleg.

Currently, the stadium is used mostly for football matches, hosting the home games of Maccabi Haifa and Hapoel Haifa. The stadium replaced Kiryat Eliezer Stadium, which was closed in 2014 and demolished in 2015. The stadium is named after the late Israeli billionaire Sammy Ofer (1922–2011), who donated $20,000,000 to build the stadium. Ofer's contribution was 19% of the total cost of the stadium.

Statue of World Peace, a 15-meter high stainless steel sculpture created and donated by Chinese artist We Yuan Yan (Yao Yuan), adorns the stadium plaza. The design features a woman and a dove poised as if about to take flight.

== History ==
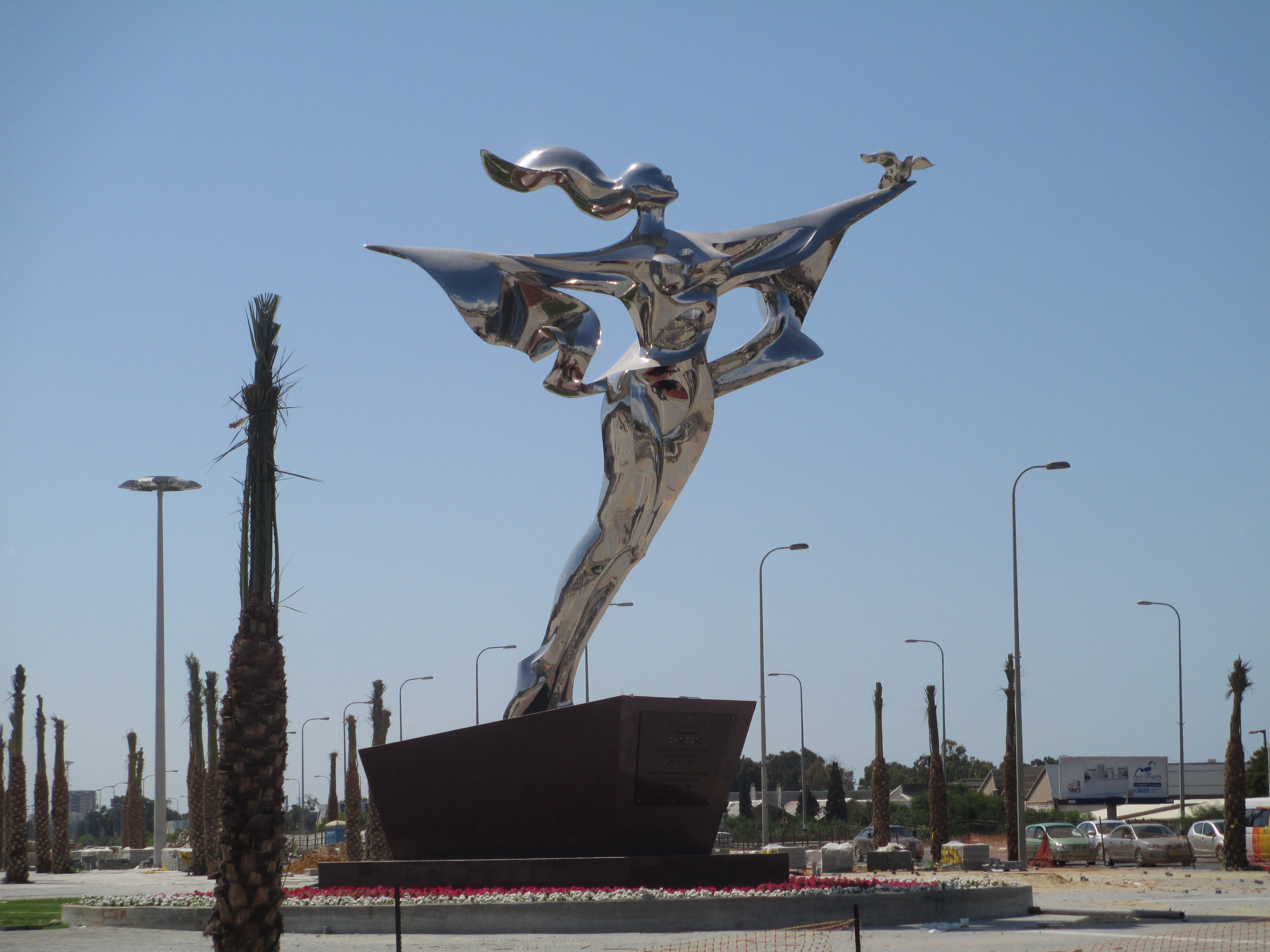
The World Peace Statue has stood on the stadium grounds since 2013

On 16 September 2008, the Haifa Construction Committee approved the stadium's plans and gave it the green light. In August 2009, official plans for the stadium were released. In September 2009, it has been announced that the works on building the foundations of the stadium would begin at the end of September 2009.

The first official match ever at Sammy Ofer Stadium was played on 27 August 2014. Hapoel Haifa hosted Hapoel Acre (Toto Cup) and won 2–0. The first historic goal in the new stadium was scored by Hapoel Haifa striker Tosaint Ricketts. The first league match was played on 15 September 2014. Maccabi Haifa hosted Bnei Sakhnin, who they defeated by a score of 4–2. The historic first goal by a Maccabi Haifa player was scored by Israeli national team midfielder Hen Ezra during stoppage time of the first half. Over 28,000 supporters were in attendance.

The first UEFA Champions League match was played on 30 September 2015 by Maccabi Tel Aviv against Dinamo Kyiv, Dinamo won 2–0 with goals by Andriy Yarmolenko and Júnior Moraes.

The first match of the Israel national football team was played on 16 November 2014. Israel hosted the Bosnia and Herzegovina national football team in the UEFA Euro 2016 qualifying match and won 3–0. The stadium was sold out, which resulted in an atmosphere beyond compare, helping Israel win their 3rd game in a row in the tournament.

The first concert at the stadium was by Omer Adam on 24 May 2018, there were 30,000 people in the audience, and all the tickets were sold within an hour of being released.

=== Milestones and Records ===
On 5 January 2017, four goals were scored by a single player at the stadium for the first time, when Hanan Maman scored in Hapoel Haifa's 6–1 victory over Kfar Qassem in a cup match. On 7 February 2022, this achievement was repeated, when Omer Atzili scored in Maccabi Haifa's 6–0 win over F.C. Ashdod in the Israeli Premier League.

In the 2022–23 Israeli Premier League, Maccabi Haifa won their third consecutive championship, with a home record of 18 wins, one draw, and no losses, accumulating 52 points out of a possible 54.

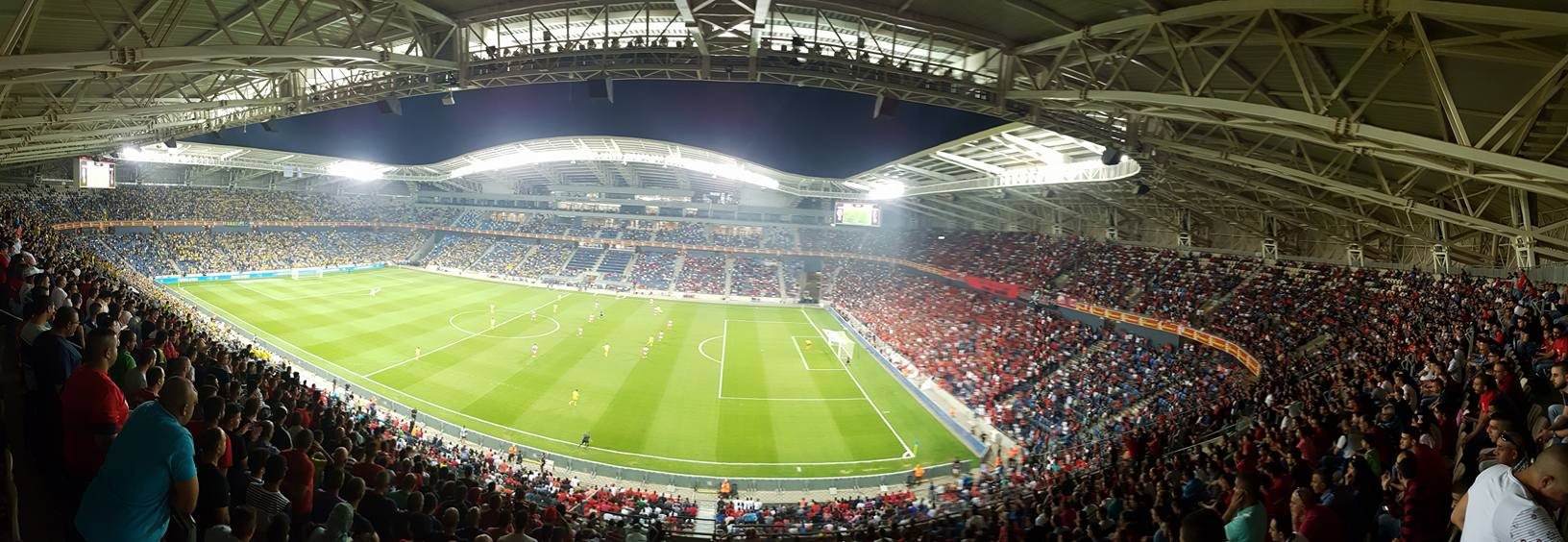
Sammy Ofer Stadium of Haifa. The second largest stadium of the Israel national football team.

International matches

Date		Result		Competition	Attendance
16 November 2014	Israel	3–0	Bosnia and Herzegovina	2016 Euro qualifying group stage	28,300
28 March 2015	Israel	0–3	Wales	2016 Euro qualifying group stage	30,200
3 September 2015	Israel	4–0	Andorra	2016 Euro qualifying group stage	22,650
5 September 2016	Israel	1–3	Italy	2018 FIFA World Cup qualification	29,300
11 June 2017	Israel	0–3	Albania	2018 FIFA World Cup qualification	15,150
2 September 2017	Israel	0–1	North Macedonia	2018 FIFA World Cup qualification	11,350
11 October 2018	Israel	2–1	Scotland	2018–19 UEFA Nations League	10,234
21 March 2019	Israel	1–1	Slovenia	UEFA Euro 2020 qualifying	12,430
24 March 2019	Israel	4–2	Austria	UEFA Euro 2020 qualifying	16,150
11 October 2020	Israel	1–2	Czech Republic	2020–21 UEFA Nations League	0
4 September 2021	Israel	5–2	Austria	2022 FIFA World Cup qualification	13,550
2 June 2022	Israel	2–2	Iceland	2022–23 UEFA Nations League	13,150

== Gates ==
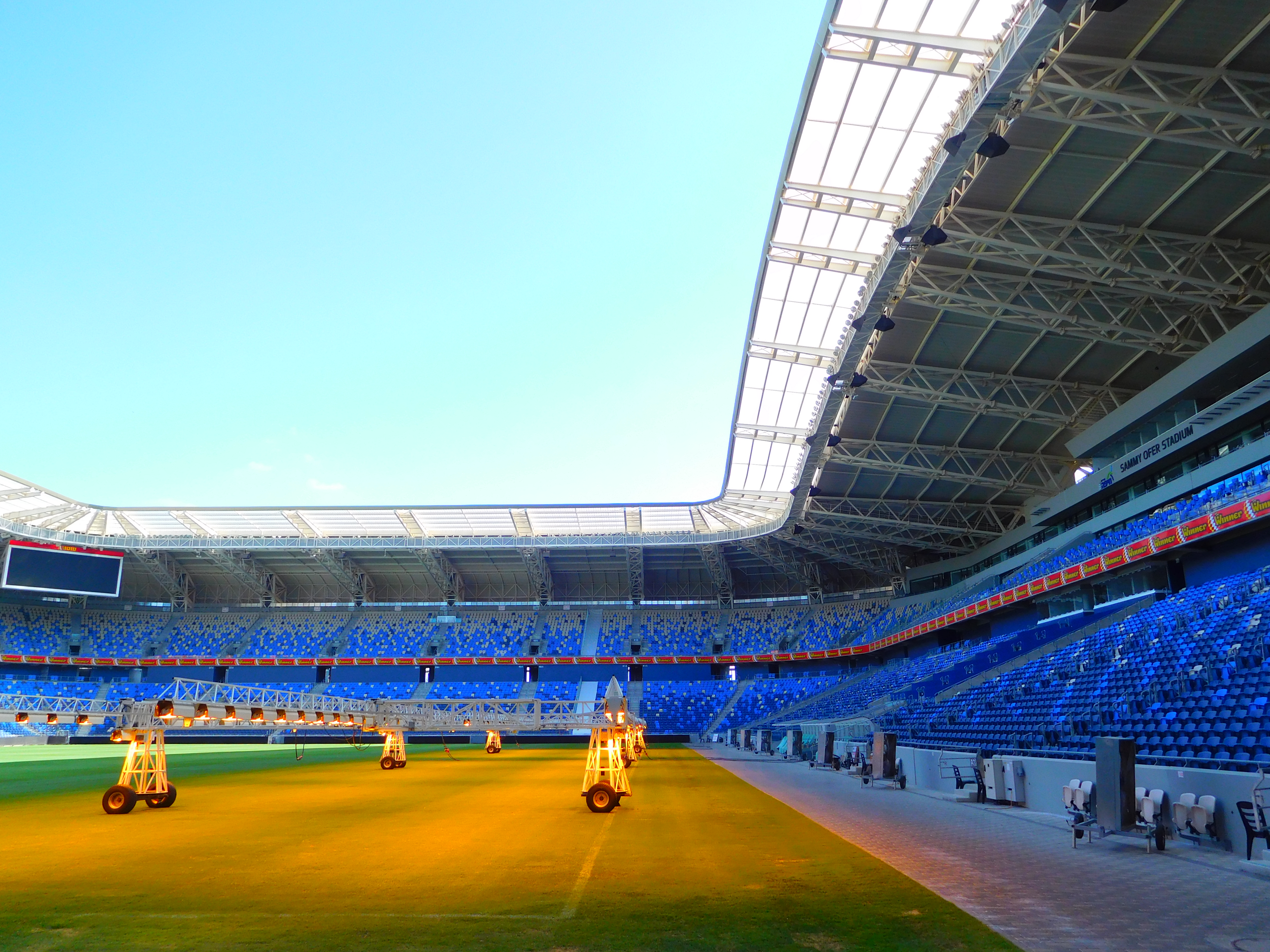
Sammy Ofer Stadium

Gate	Entrance	Area
Silver Club	A, B	301–305, 307, 309-312
Press Box	A, B	306, 308
Gold and Diamond Club	VIP	401–410
Sky Box	VIP	501–536
North Tribune	C, D	101–109, 201-212
Family Tribune	E, G	110–113, 119–122, 213–217, 223-227
East Tribune	F	114–118, 218-222
South Tribune	H, J	123–128, 228-234
Guest Tribune	K	129–132, 235-240

== See also ==
- List of football stadiums in Israel
- Kiryat Eliezer Stadium
