= Ruslan Barsky =

Israeli association footballer, who holds a Ukrainian passport

Roslan Barsky
Personal information
- Date of birth: 3 January 1992 (age 34)
- Place of birth: Holon, Israel
- Height: 1.78 m (5 ft 10 in)
- Position: Midfielder

Team information
- Current team: Hapoel Hadera
- Number: 9

Youth career
- Hapoel Tzafririm Holon
- Maccabi Tel Aviv

Senior career*
Years	Team	Apps	(Gls)
2011–2021	Maccabi Tel Aviv	32	(1)
2012–2013	→ Bnei Yehuda Tel Aviv (loan)	5	(0)
2013–2014	→ Maccabi Jaffa (loan)	28	(0)
2014–2015	→ Hapoel Jerusalem (loan)	35	(0)
2015–2017	→ Beitar Tel Aviv Bat Yam (loan)	69	(5)
2017–2018	→ Hapoel Haifa (loan)	34	(2)
2020–2021	→ Hapoel Haifa (loan)	26	(2)
2021–2022	Hapoel Jerusalem	22	(0)
2022–2023	Maccabi Bnei Reineh	9	(0)
2023	Hapoel Hadera	16	(0)
2023–2024	Borac Banja Luka	8	(0)
2024–2025	Hapoel Hadera	25	(1)

International career
2008	Israel U17	5	(0)
2010	Israel U18	2	(0)
2011	Israel U19	6	(0)
- * Club domestic league appearances and goals

Roslan Barsky (or Roslan Barski, Hebrew: רוסלן ברסקי, Ukrainian: Руслан Барський; born 3 January 1992) is an Israeli professional former footballer who played as a midfielder

== Early life ==
Barsky was born in Holon, Israel, to parents who immigrated from Ukraine to Israel. As a child, Barsky was a long-distance runner. In 2010, Barsky's father, a former wrestler, died from cancer.

He also holds a Ukrainian passport.

== Club career ==
In 2017–18, aged 25, Barsky consistently played in the Israeli Premier League for the first time in his career because of injuries. That season against Hapoel Be'er Sheva, he set a league record for distance ran at 12. 7 km.
