= Lior Inbrum =

Israeli footballer

Personal information
- Date of birth: 12 January 1996 (age 30)
- Place of birth: Kiryat Gat, Israel
- Height: 1.80 m (5 ft 11 in)
- Position: Winger

Team information
- Current team: Maccabi Herzliya
- Number: 10

Youth career
- Maccabi Kiryat Gat
- F.C. Ashdod

Senior career*
Years	Team	Apps	(Gls)
2014–2017	F.C. Ashdod	85	(21)
2017–2020	Gent	0	(0)
2017	→ Maribor (loan)	2	(0)
2018	→ F.C. Ashdod (loan)	13	(4)
2018–2019	→ Beitar Jerusalem (loan)	17	(3)
2019–2020	→ Hapoel Tel Aviv (loan)	11	(1)
2020	→ Maccabi Petah Tikva (loan)	12	(0)
2020–2021	Maccabi Petah Tikva	31	(2)
2021–2022	F.C. Ashdod	11	(2)
2022	→ Maccabi Petah Tikva (loan)	9	(0)
2022–2023	Hapoel Umm al-Fahm	11	(0)
2023	Sektzia Ness Ziona	5	(0)
2023–2024	Hapoel Kfar Saba	23	(2)
2024–	Maccabi Herzliya	33	(6)

International career
2014	Israel U19	3	(1)
2016–2017	Israel U21	2	(0)
- * Club domestic league appearances and goals as of 24 June 2026

Lior "Or" Inbrum (Hebrew: ליאור "אור" אינברום; born 12 January 1996) is an Israeli professional footballer who plays as a winger for Maccabi Herzliya.

Inbrum was born in Kiryat Gat, Israel, to an Ethiopian-Jewish family.
