= Yahav Gurfinkel =

Israeli footballer

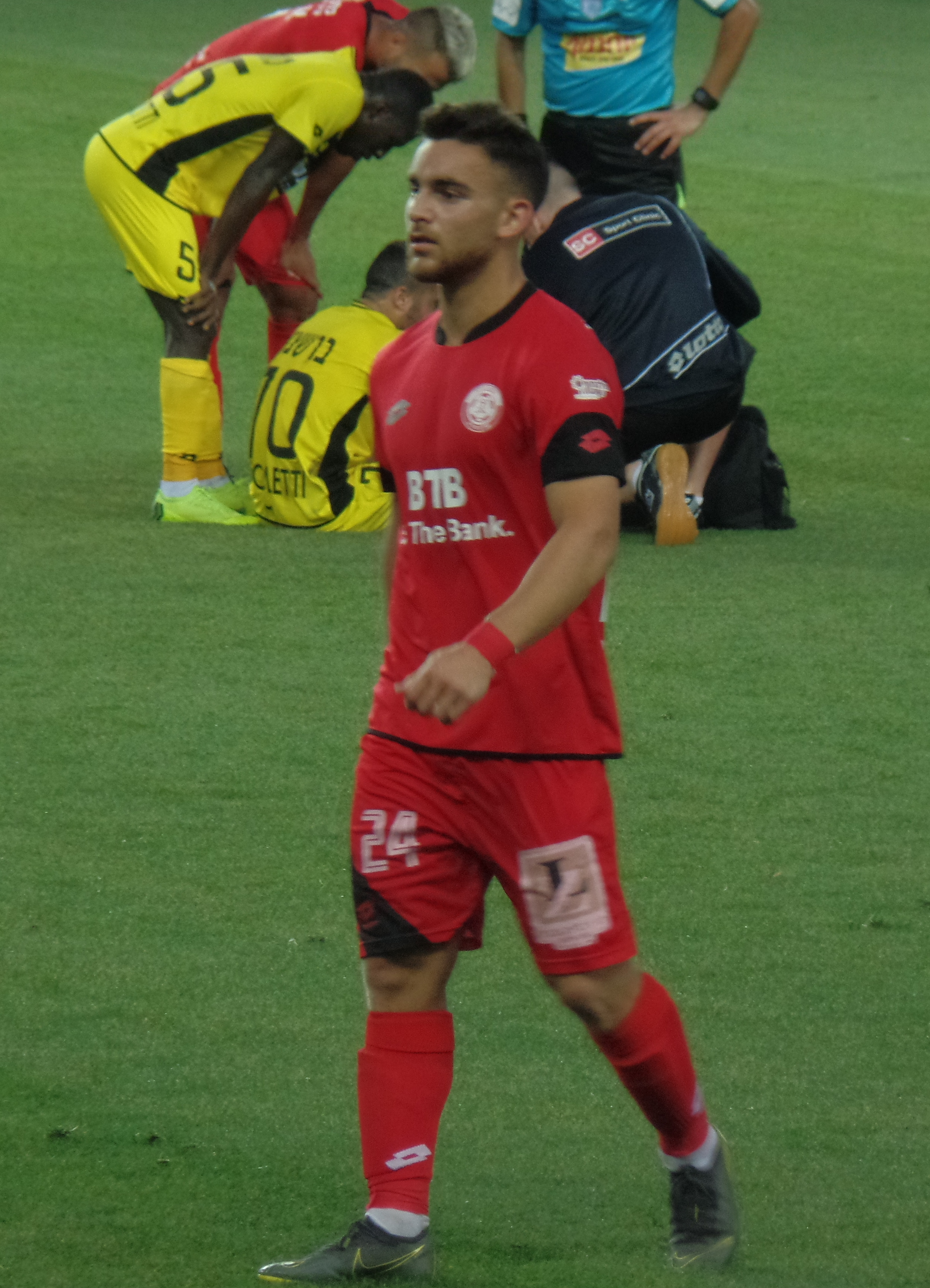
- Gurfinkel playing for Hapoel Hadera in 2019

Personal information
- Date of birth: 27 June 1998 (age 28)
- Place of birth: Amikam, Israel
- Height: 1.71 m (5 ft 7 in)
- Positions: Left-back; left midfielder

Team information
- Current team: AEK Larnaca
- Number: 13

Youth career
- Maccabi Haifa

Senior career*
Years	Team	Apps	(Gls)
2017–2021	Maccabi Haifa	3	(0)
2017–2018	→ Hapoel Nazareth Illit (loan)	36	(4)
2018–2020	→ Hapoel Hadera (loan)	50	(0)
2020–2021	→ Hapoel Haifa (loan)	30	(0)
2021–2022	IFK Norrköping	6	(0)
2022–2024	Hapoel Tel Aviv	46	(0)
2024–2025	Chengdu Rongcheng	58	(3)
2026–	AEK Larnaca	6	(0)

International career^{‡}
2014	Israel U16	2	(0)
2015	Israel U17	4	(0)
2015–2016	Israel U18	4	(0)
2016–2017	Israel U19	10	(0)
2018–2020	Israel U21	13	(0)
- * Club domestic league appearances and goals as of 14 June 2026 ‡ National team caps and goals as of 8 July 2021

Yahav Gurfinkel (Hebrew: יהב גורפינקל; born 27 June 1998) is an Israeli professional footballer who plays as a defender for Cypriot First Division club AEK Larnaca.

== Early life ==
Gurfinkel was born in moshav Amikam, Israel, to a family of Ashkenazi Jewish descent.

== Club career ==
He made his Israeli Premier League debut for Maccabi Haifa on 21 January 2017 in a match against Ironi Kiryat Shmona.

On 31 May 2022, Gurfinkel's contract with Swedish club IFK Norrköping was terminated by mutual consent.

On 1 February 2024, Israeli club Hapoel Tel Aviv announced that Gurfinkel would be transferring to Chinese Super League club Chengdu Rongcheng.

On 29 January 2026, Gurfinkel signed Cypriot First Division club AEK Larnaca with two-and-a-half years contract.

== Career statistics ==
As of match played 2 November 2024

Appearances and goals by club, season and competition
Club	Season	League			National cup		League cup		Continental		Other		Total	
Club	Season	Division	Apps	Goals	Apps	Goals	Apps	Goals	Apps	Goals	Apps	Goals	Apps	Goals
Maccabi Haifa	2016–17	Israeli Premier League	3	0	0	0	2	0	—		—		5	0
Maccabi Haifa	2019–20	Israeli Premier League	0	0	—		1	0	—		—		1	0
Maccabi Haifa	2020–21	Israeli Premier League	0	0	—		2	0	—		—		2	0
Maccabi Haifa	Total		3	0	—		5	0	—		—		8	0
Hapoel Haifa (loan)	2017–18	Liga Leumit	36	4	1	0	—		—		—		37	4
Hapoel Hadera (loan)	2018–19	Israeli Premier League	22	0	4	0	0	0	—		—		26	0
Hapoel Hadera (loan)	2019–20	Israeli Premier League	28	0	1	0	0	0	—		—		29	0
Hapoel Hadera (loan)	Total		50	0	5	0	0	0	—		—		55	0
Hapoel Haifa (loan)	2020–21	Israeli Premier League	30	0	2	0	—		—		—		32	0
IFK Norrköping	2021	Allsvenskan	6	0	2	0	—		—		—		8	0
Hapoel Tel Aviv	2022–23	Israeli Premier League	29	0	1	0	3	0	—		—		33	0
Hapoel Tel Aviv	2023–24	Israeli Premier League	17	0	0	0	5	0	—		—		22	0
Hapoel Tel Aviv	Total		46	0	1	0	8	0	—		—		55	0
Chengdu Rongcheng	2024	Chinese Super League	30	1	1	0	—		—		—		31	1
Chengdu Rongcheng	2025	Chinese Super League	28	2	3	0	—		5	0	—		36	2
Chengdu Rongcheng	Total		58	3	4	0	—		5	0	—		67	3
Career total			229	7	15	0	13	0	5	0	0	0	262	7
