= Miki Siroshtein =

Israeli footballer

Michael "Miki" Seroshtan
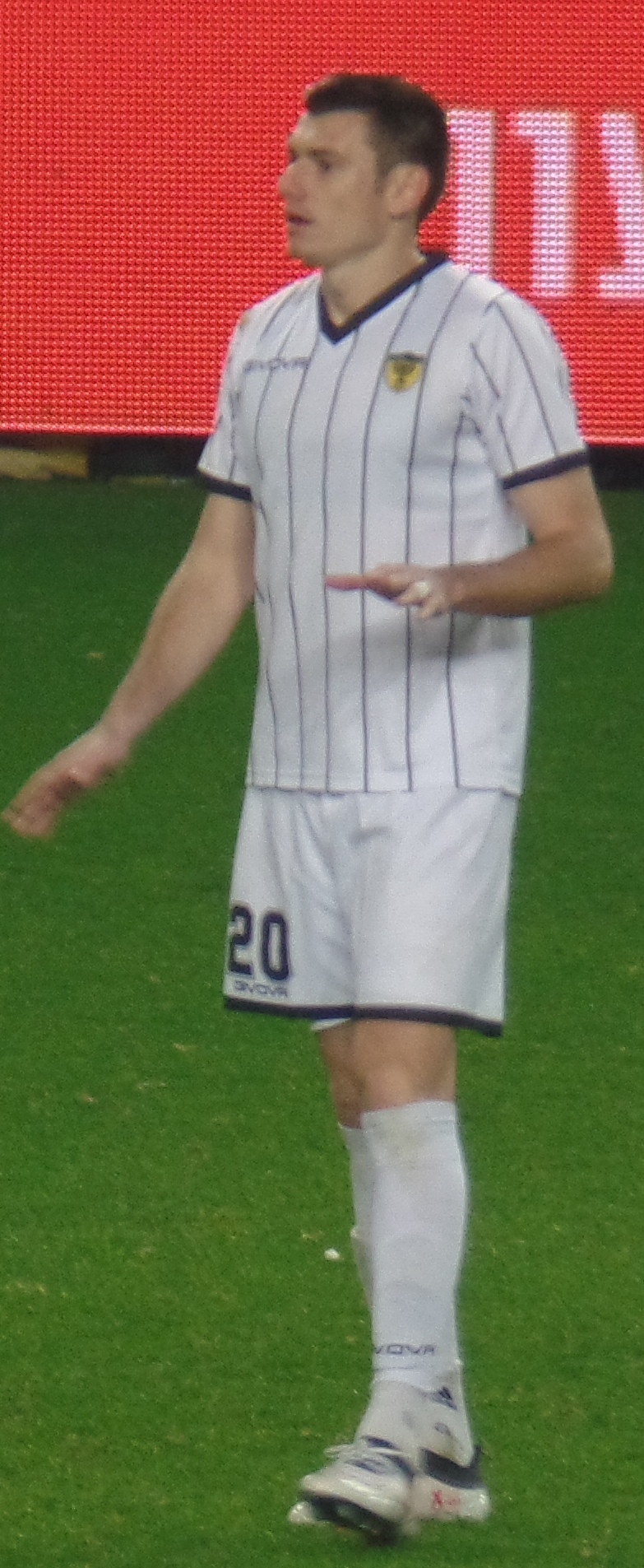
- Seroshtan playing for Beitar Jerusalem in 2018

Personal information
- Full name: Michael Seroshtan
- Date of birth: April 25, 1989 (age 37)
- Place of birth: Ukrainian Soviet Socialist Republic, Soviet Union (now in Ukraine)
- Height: 1.91 m (6 ft 3 in)
- Positions: Centre back; defensive midfielder

Youth career
- 2002–2009: Hapoel Ra'anana

Senior career*
Years	Team	Apps	(Gls)
2009–2012	Hapoel Ra'anana	67	(5)
2012–2016	F.C. Ashdod	114	(12)
2016	Bnei Yehuda Tel Aviv	1	(0)
2016–2017	F.C. Ashdod	26	(1)
2017–2019	Beitar Jerusalem	47	(2)
2019–2020	Suphanburi	9	(1)
2020–2021	Hapoel Haifa	36	(0)
2022	Bnei Yehuda Tel Aviv	11	(0)
2022–2024	Sektzia Ness Ziona	55	(1)
- * Club domestic league appearances and goals

Michael "Miki" Siroshtein (Ukrainian: Майкл Сіроштейн ,Hebrew: מיקי סירושטיין; born April 25, 1989) is an Israeli former footballer.

== Early life ==
Michael Siroshtein was born in Soviet Ukraine, USSR, and immigrated to Israel in 1990 when he was one year old. His parents divorced after three years, and his father emigrated to Australia.

== Career ==
Siroshtein played in the youth system of Hapoel Ra'anana until 2009. Siroshtein joined the senior team at 2009–10 season, and lost in the final of the Toto Cup to Beitar Jerusalem.

Siroshtein also played for Bnei Yehuda Tel Aviv, and F.C. Ashdod. On June 13, 2017, Siroshtein signed with Beitar Jerusalem for one year.

On 2 July 2019 signed to the Thai League 1 club Suphanburi.

On 8 January 2020 signed to Hapoel Haifa.
