= Odah Marshall =

Nigerian footballer (born 1992)

Personal information
- Full name: Odah Onoriode Marshall
- Date of birth: 14 April 1992 (age 34)
- Place of birth: Nigeria
- Height: 1.87 m (6 ft 1 1/2 in)
- Position: Forward

Senior career*
Years	Team	Apps	(Gls)
2014–2016	Enugu Rangers		
2016–2017	Sông Lam Nghệ An	26	(10)
2017	Yadanarbon		
2017–2018	Rivers United		
2018	Mirbat		
2018–2019	ENPPI	13	(6)
2019	Ismaily	9	(0)
2019	Naft Al-Wasat		
2020–2021	Hapoel Hadera	29	(8)
2021–2022	Boluspor	8	(1)
2022	Bnei Sakhnin	14	(1)
2022	Hapoel Umm al-Fahm	4	(0)
2022–2023	Hapoel Kfar Saba	24	(3)
- * Club domestic league appearances and goals as of 15 June 2023

Odah Marshall (born 14 April 1992) is a Nigerian footballer who plays as a forward.
