= 2022 Israel State Cup final =

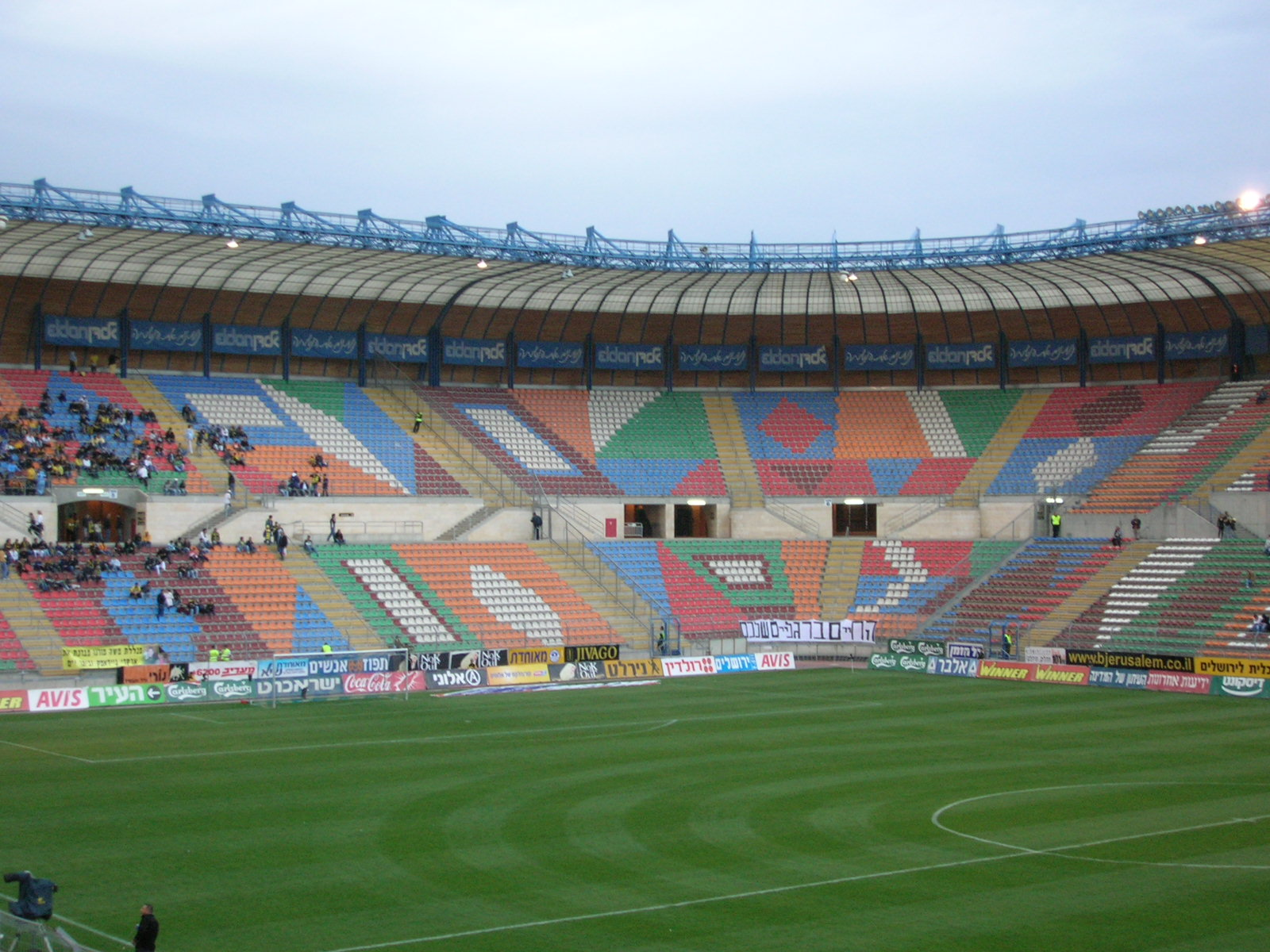
- Teddy Stadium in Jerusalem hosted the final
- Event: 2021–22 Israel State Cup
Maccabi Haifa	Hapoel Be'er Sheva
2	2
- After extra time Hapoel Be'er Sheva won 3–1 on penalties
- Date: 24 May 2022
- Venue: Teddy Stadium, Jerusalem

The 2022 Israel State Cup final decided the winner of the 2021–22 Israel State Cup, the 86th season of the Israel State Cup. It was played on 24 May 2022 at the Teddy Stadium in Jerusalem, between Maccabi Haifa and Hapoel Be'er Sheva. Hapoel Beer Sheva beat Maccabi Haifa 3–1 in the penalties, after 2–2 in the game.

== Background ==
Maccabi Haifa had previously played 16 Israel cup Finals, winning 6 of them. Their most recent appearance in the final was in 2015, in which they beat Maccabi Tel Aviv 1–0 to win the State Cup.

Hapoel Be'er Sheva had previously played 5 Israel cup Finals, winning 2 of them. Their most recent appearance in the final was in 2020, in which they beat Maccabi Petah Tikva 2–0 to win the State Cup.

== Road to the final ==
Maccabi Haifa		Round	Hapoel Be'er Sheva
Opponent	Result	2021–22 Israel State Cup	Result	Opponent
Hapoel Jerusalem (1)	2–0	Eighth round	3–0	Beitar Tel Aviv Bat Yam (2)
Beitar Jerusalem (1)	4–0	Round of 16	2–1 (a.e.t.)	Maccabi Netanya (1)
Hapoel Hadera (1)	2–0	Quarter-finals first leg	0–1	Maccabi Petah Tikva (1)
Hapoel Hadera (1)	1–0	Quarter-finals second leg	2–0 (a.e.t.)	Maccabi Petah Tikva (1)
Hapoel Haifa (1)	2–0	Semi-finals	3–1	Maccabi Tel Aviv (1)

== Match ==
=== Details ===
24 May 2022

Maccabi Haifa (1)	2–2 (a.e.t.)	Hapoel Be'er Sheva (1)
Atzili 55' (pen.); Vítor 87' (o.g.)	Report	27' Safouri; 70' Hatuel
Penalties
Haziza (penalty missed); Abu Fani (penalty scored); Donyoh (penalty missed); Tchibota (penalty missed)	1–3	(penalty missed) Asprilla; (penalty scored) Yosefi; (penalty scored) Abu Abaid; (penalty scored) Lopes

Teddy Stadium, Jerusalem
Referee: Daniel Bar Natan

Maccabi Haifa	Hapoel Be'er Sheva

GK	77	(Israel) Roee Fucs
RB	14	(Spain) José Rodríguez (substituted off) 83'
CB	5	(Serbia) Bogdan Planić (c)
CB	3	(Israel) Sean Goldberg
LB	12	(Israel) Sun Menahem (substituted off) 46'
DM	26	(Israel) Mahmoud Jaber (substituted off) 72'
CM	4	(Niger) Ali Mohamed (substituted off) 46'
LM	10	(Suriname) Tjaronn Chery (substituted off) 115'
LW	8	(Israel) Dolev Haziza
RW	7	(Israel) Omer Atzili
CF	11	(Ghana) Godsway Donyoh
Substitutes:
GK	52	(Israel) Itamar Israeli
DF	15	(Israel) Ofri Arad
DF	23	(Guadeloupe) Mickaël Alphonse (substituted on) 46'
DF	24	(Israel) Uri Dahan
DF	33	(Israel) Maor Levi
DF	55	(Israel) Rami Gershon (substituted on) 115'
MF	6	(Israel) Neta Lavi (substituted on) 46'
MF	16	(Israel) Mohammad Abu Fani (substituted on) 83'
DF	55	(Israel) Rami Gershon
FW	13	(Republic of the Congo) Mavis Tchibota (substituted on) 72'
Manager:
(Israel) Barak Bakhar

GK	55	(Israel) Omri Glazer
RB	30	(Israel) Or Dadia (substituted off) 63'
CB	5	(Israel) Eyad Abu Abaid
CB	18	(Israel) Eitan Tibi
CB	4	(Israel) Miguel Vitor (c)
LB	22	(Portugal) Hélder Lopes
CM	35	(Argentina) Mariano Bareiro
CM	3	(Israel) David Keltjens
RW	10	(Israel) Dor Micha (substituted off) 83'
LW	7	(Israel) Ramzi Safouri (substituted off) 68'
CF	31	(Ghana) Eugene Ansah (substituted off) 83'
Substitutes:
GK	1	(Israel) Ariel Harush
DF	44	(Israel) Hatem Abd Elhamed
MF	15	(Israel) Tomer Yosefi (substituted on) 83'
MF	16	(Brazil) Gustavo Marmentini (substituted on) 83'
FW	9	(Israel) Itay Shechter
FW	11	(Israel) Sagiv Yehezkel
FW	13	(Israel) Nikita Rukavytsya
FW	70	(Colombia) Danilo Asprilla (substituted on) 63'
FW	77	(Israel) Rotem Hatuel (substituted on) 68'
Manager:
(Israel) Elianiv Barda
