= Davide Petrucci =

Italian footballer (born 1991)

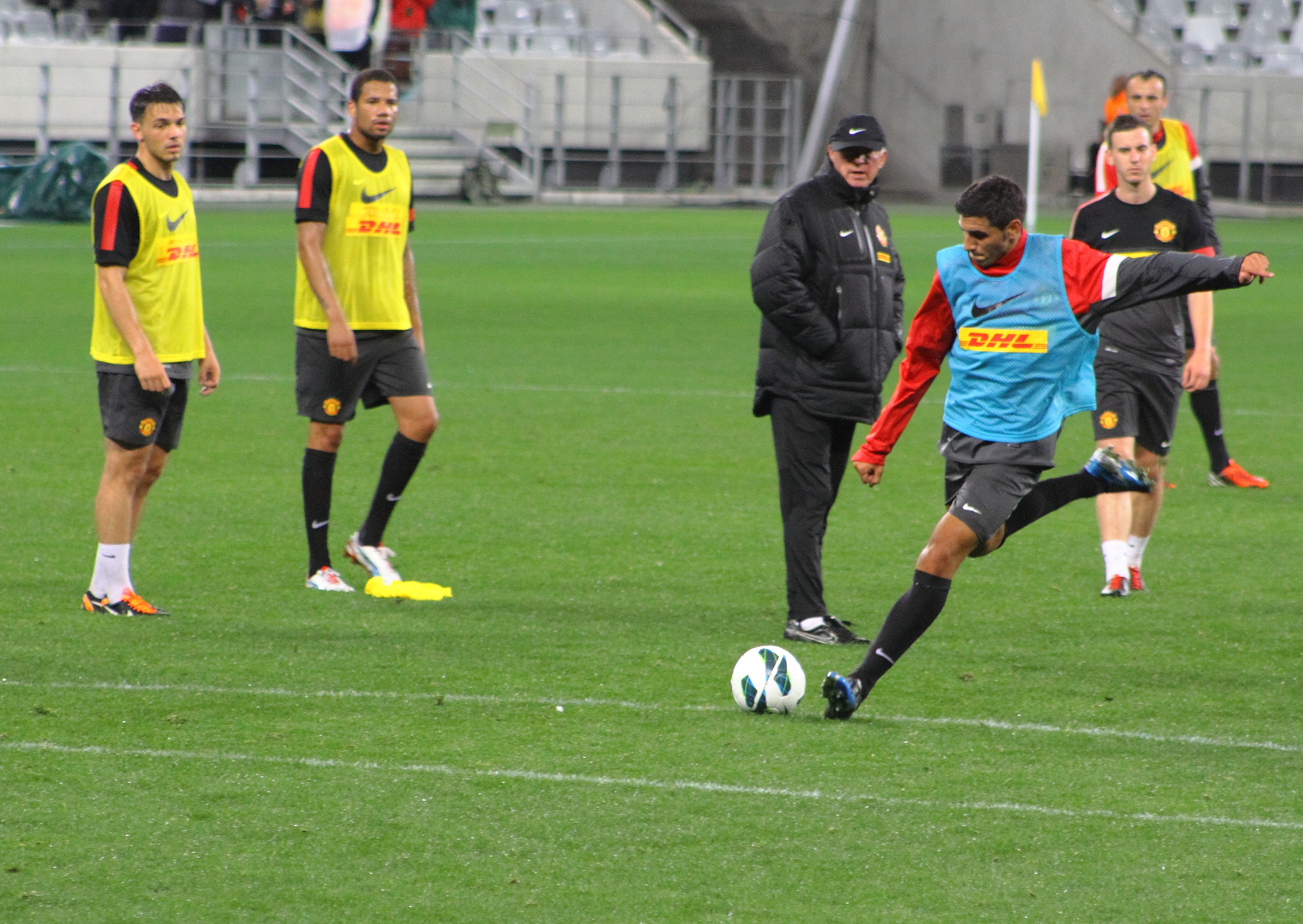
- Davide Petrucci shoots in practice as Alex Ferguson watches

Personal information
- Full name: Davide Petrucci
- Date of birth: 5 October 1991 (age 35)
- Place of birth: Rome, Italy
- Height: 1.84 m (6 ft 0 in)
- Position: Midfielder

Youth career
- 2001–2008: Roma
- 2008–2013: Manchester United

Senior career*
Years	Team	Apps	(Gls)
2013–2014	Manchester United	0	(0)
2013	→ Peterborough United (loan)	4	(1)
2013	→ Antwerp (loan)	12	(0)
2014	→ Charlton Athletic (loan)	5	(0)
2014–2016	CFR Cluj	58	(7)
2016–2019	Çaykur Rizespor	55	(2)
2019–2020	Ascoli	29	(0)
2020–2021	Cosenza	23	(0)
2021–2023	Hapoel Be'er Sheva	25	(2)
2023–2024	Brindisi	24	(2)
2024–2025	Messina	27	(1)

International career
2006–2007	Italy U16	12	(1)
2007–2008	Italy U17	8	(1)
2008–2010	Italy U19	3	(0)
- * Club domestic league appearances and goals as of 27 April 2025

Davide Petrucci (born 5 October 1991) is an Italian professional footballer who plays as a midfielder. He most recently played for Serie D club Messina.

== Club career ==
=== A.S. Roma ===
Born in the San Basilio suburb of Rome, Petrucci began his football career with his local club, Roma, playing in their youth team. During the 2007–08 season, he scored 14 goals in 19 appearances for the Roma youth team, alerting Manchester United to his talents. But the AS Roma offered him a contract worth only around £16,000 per annum, the minimum wage for Italian youth team players, claiming that it would upset the other youth players who had already accepted similar deals if they offered him any more. However, despite the club's claims that he would have been given opportunities in the first team in the 2008–09 season, Petrucci expressed concerns that he had not already been called up. When he asked Roma for some time to consider their offer, the club gave him a three-day deadline. Around this time, Manchester United offered Petrucci a £95,000-a-year contract, which the Italian youngster accepted on 13 June 2008. To comply with FIFA regulations with regard to the international transfer of players under the age of 18, United also offered Petrucci's father, Stefano, a job as well as offering to pay for regular flights back to Italy.

=== Manchester United ===
United paid Roma approximately £200,000 in compensation for the transfer, which the Italians were unable to contest as Petrucci was not under contract with them. Italian football regulations state that under-17s may not be signed to professional contracts, meaning that Petrucci would not have been able to sign with Roma until his 17th birthday in October 2008. He travelled to Manchester on 30 June 2008, and began training with Manchester United the following day. At the end of July 2008, Petrucci was part of the Manchester United team that won the Premier (under-17) section of the 2008 Milk Cup. He made regular appearances for the Manchester United under-18 side during the 2008–09 season, and got his first taste of reserve team action on 18 November 2008, when he played 20 minutes of a 2–1 defeat away to Hull City, coming on as a substitute for Antonio Bryan. On 22 January 2009, he made another appearance for the reserve team in the Manchester Senior Cup, scoring the first of the team's three goals in the fourth minute of a 3–0 win over Accrington Stanley.

==== Loan to Peterborough United ====
On 9 January 2013, Petrucci joined Peterborough United on loan, he joined along with his teammate Scott Wootton who was signed until the end of the season. He made his debut on 12 January in a 2–1 defeat to Nottingham Forest. He scored his first professional goal in a 2–1 win over Leicester City on 9 February 2013.

==== Loan to Royal Antwerp and Charlton Athletic ====
On 2 September 2013, Petrucci was initially loaned to Belgian side Royal Antwerp until the end of the season, but was recalled in January 2014.

On 27 March 2014, Petrucci joined Championship side Charlton Athletic on loan until the end of the 2013–14 season.

=== CFR Cluj ===
On 8 September 2014, after being named in United's 25-man Premier League squad, Petrucci terminated his contract by mutual consent to secure a move to Romanian side CFR Cluj, six days after the transfer window closed.

=== Çaykur Rizespor ===
On 29 August 2016, Petrucci was reported to have joined Turkish side Çaykur Rizespor.

=== Ascoli ===
On 13 July 2019, he signed a 2-year contract with Ascoli.

=== Cosenza ===
On 5 October 2020 he moved to Cosenza on a one-year contract.

=== Hapoel Be'er Sheva ===
On 10 July 2021 Petrucci move to Hapoel Be'er Sheva on a two-year deal. On 2 February 2023, after a year of not playing, he reached an agreement with the team on the release of his contract.

=== Brindisi ===
On 1 August 2023, Petrucci joined Serie C side Brindisi, signing a two-year contract.

== Career statistics ==
=== Club ===
As of match played 17 May 2025

Appearances by club, season and competition
Club	Season	League			National Cup		League Cup		Europe		Other		Total	
Club	Season	Division	Apps	Goals	Apps	Goals	Apps	Goals	Apps	Goals	Apps	Goals	Apps	Goals
Peterborough United (loan)	2012–13	Championship	4	1	—		—		—		—		4	1
Antwerp (loan)	2013–14	Belgian Second Division	12	0	—		—		—		—		12	0
Charlton Athletic (loan)	2013–14	Championship	5	0	—		—		—		—		5	0
CFR Cluj	2014–15	Liga I	14	1	3	0	—		—		—		17	1
CFR Cluj	2015–16	Liga I	38	4	5	0	2	0	—		—		45	4
CFR Cluj	2016–17	Liga I	6	2	—		1	0	—		1 (Note: Appearance in Supercupa României)	0	8	2
CFR Cluj	Total		58	7	8	0	3	0	—		1	0	70	7
Çaykur Rizespor	2016–17	Süper Lig	30	2	6	1	—		—		—		36	3
Çaykur Rizespor	2017–18	TFF First League	15	0	0	0	—		—		—		15	0
Çaykur Rizespor	2018–19	Süper Lig	10	0	3	0	—		—		—		13	0
Çaykur Rizespor	Total		55	2	9	1	—		—		—		64	3
Ascoli	2019–20	Serie B	28	0	2	0	—		—		—		30	0
Ascoli	2020–21	Serie B	1	0	0	0	—		—		—		1	0
Ascoli	Total		29	0	2	0	—		—		—		31	0
Cosenza	2020–21	Serie B	23	0	1	1	—		—		—		24	1
Hapoel Be'er Sheva	2021–22	Israeli Premier League	15	1	2	0	2	0	6 (Note: Appearances in UEFA Conference League)	0	—		25	1
Hapoel Be'er Sheva	2022–23	Israeli Premier League	0	0	0	0	0	0	0	0	0	0	0	0
Hapoel Be'er Sheva	Total		15	1	2	0	2	0	6	0	0	0	31	0
Brindisi	2023–24	Serie C	25	2	2 (Note: Appearances in Coppa Italia Serie C)	0	—		—		—		27	2
Messina	2024–25	Serie C	27	1	0	0	—		—		2 (Note: Appearances in Serie C-Relegation play-offs)	0	29	2
Career total			253	14	24	2	5	0	6	0	1	0	289	16

== Honours ==
CFR Cluj

- Cupa României: 2015–16
- Supercupa României runner-up: 2016

Çaykur Rizespor

- TFF 1. Lig: 2017–18

Hapoel Be'er Sheva

- Israel State Cup: 2021–22
- Toto Cup runner-up: 2021–22
- Israel Super Cup: 2022
