= Omri Glazer =

Israeli footballer (born 1996)

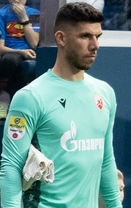
- Glazer playing for Red Star Belgrade in 2023

Personal information
- Full name: Omri Glazer
- Date of birth: 11 March 1996 (age 30)
- Place of birth: Tel Aviv, Israel
- Height: 1.91 m (6 ft 3 in)
- Position: Goalkeeper

Team information
- Current team: Maccabi Haifa
- Number: 55

Youth career
- 2006–2013: Maccabi Tel Aviv
- 2013–2016: Hapoel Ra'anana

Senior career*
Years	Team	Apps	(Gls)
2015–2016	Hapoel Ra'anana	7	(0)
2016–2021	Maccabi Haifa	57	(0)
2019–2020	→ Sektzia Ness Ziona (loan)	33	(0)
2021–2023	Hapoel Be'er Sheva	66	(0)
2023-2026	Red Star Belgrade	51	(0)
2026–	Maccabi Haifa	0	(0)

International career^{‡}
2014	Israel U19	4	(0)
2015–2018	Israel U21	9	(0)
2017–	Israel	23	(0)
- * Club domestic league appearances and goals as of 22 May 2026 ‡ National team caps and goals as of 20:00, 3 June 2026 (UTC)

Omri Glazer (Hebrew: עומרי גלזר; born 11 March 1996) is an Israeli professional footballer who plays as a goalkeeper for Israeli club Maccabi Haifa and the Israel national team.

== Early and personal life ==
Glazer was born and raised in Tel Aviv, Israel, to an Israeli family of Ashkenazi Jewish (Romanian-Jewish) descent.

He also holds a Romanian passport, on account of his Ashkenazi Jewish ancestors, which eases the move to certain European football leagues.

== Club career ==
Glazer started his career in the youth department of Maccabi Tel Aviv, and at the age of 17 he joined the youth team of Hapoel Ra'anana. On 16 May 2015, he made his senior debut, when he started in a 4–2 loss to Hapoel Petah Tikva in the last round of the 2014–15 season.

On 23 June 2016, Glazer signed for Maccabi Haifa. He initially served as a substitute goalkeeper for Ohad Levita, before becoming the first goalkeeper following the latter's injury. In July 2019, he was loaned out to Sektzia Ness Ziona.

In June 2021, he signed a three-year contract with Hapoel Be'er Sheva. In the 2022 Israel State Cup final, he managed to save three penalties during the shootouts to win the title against his former club Maccabi Haifa. Afterward that year, he saved another two penalties in a 4–3 victory in the shootouts against the same opponent during the Israel Super Cup.

On 22 June 2023, Glazer signed a three-year contract with Red Star Belgrade. Later that year, on 19 September, he managed to hold the record for most saves in a single UEFA Champions League game, with 13 saves for Red Star Belgrade in a 2023–24 group stage match against Manchester City, despite an eventual 3–1 defeat.

== International career ==
In November 2016, he was first called up to the senior Israeli squad for the 2018 FIFA World Cup European qualifiers, ahead of the match against Albania.

== Career statistics ==
=== Club ===
As of match played 22 May 2026

Appearances and goals by club, season and competition
Club	Season	League			National cup (Note: Includes Israel State Cup, Serbian Cup)		League cup (Note: Includes Toto Cup)		Europe		Other		Total	
Club	Season	Division	Apps	Goals	Apps	Goals	Apps	Goals	Apps	Goals	Apps	Goals	Apps	Goals
Hapoel Ra'anana	2014–15	Israeli Premier League	1	0	0	0	—		—		—		1	0
Hapoel Ra'anana	2015–16	Israeli Premier League	6	0	1	0	1	0	—		—		8	0
Hapoel Ra'anana	Total		7	0	1	0	1	0	—		—		9	0
Maccabi Haifa	2016–17	Israeli Premier League	26	0	1	0	3	0	0	0	0	0	30	0
Maccabi Haifa	2017–18	Israeli Premier League	24	0	4	0	4	0	0	0	—		32	0
Maccabi Haifa	2018–19	Israeli Premier League	3	0	0	0	2	0	0	0	—		5	0
Maccabi Haifa	2020–21	Israeli Premier League	4	0	0	0	0	0	—		—		4	0
Maccabi Haifa	Total		57	0	5	0	9	0	0	0	0	0	71	0
Sektzia Ness Ziona (loan)	2019–20	Israeli Premier League	33	0	0	0	4	0	—		—		37	0
Hapoel Be'er Sheva	2021–22	Israeli Premier League	31	0	3	0	3	0	0	0	0	0	37	0
Hapoel Be'er Sheva	2022–23	Israeli Premier League	35	0	1	0	0	0	12 (Note: Appearances in UEFA Europa Conference League)	0	1 (Note: Appearance in Israel Super Cup)	0	49	0
Hapoel Be'er Sheva	Total		66	0	4	0	3	0	12	0	1	0	86	0
Red Star Belgrade	2023–24	Serbian SuperLiga	34	0	4	0	—		6 (Note: Appearances in UEFA Champions League)	0	—		44	0
Red Star Belgrade	2024–25	Serbian SuperLiga	12	0	3	0	—		3	0	—		18	0
Red Star Belgrade	2025–26	Serbian SuperLiga	5	0	2	0	—		0	0	—		7	0
Red Star Belgrade	Total		51	0	9	0	—		9	0	—		69	0
Career total			214	0	19	0	17	0	21	0	1	0	272	0

=== International ===
As of match played 3 June 2026

Appearances and goals by national team and year
National team	Year	Apps	Goals
Israel	2017	1	0
Israel	2022	2	0
Israel	2023	9	0
Israel	2024	5	0
Israel	2025	4	0
Israel	2026	2	0
Total		23	0

== Honours ==
Maccabi Haifa

- Israeli Premier League: 2020–21

Hapoel Be'er Sheva

- Israel State Cup: 2021–22
- Israel Super Cup: 2022

Red Star Belgrade

- Serbian SuperLiga: 2023–24, 2024–25, 2025–26
- Serbian Cup: 2023–24, 2024–25, 2025–26

Individual

- Goalkeeper of the season in the Israeli Premier League: 2021–22, 2022–23

== See also ==
- List of Jewish footballers
- List of Jews in sports
- List of Israelis
