= Or Dadia =

Israeli footballer

Personal information
- Date of birth: 12 July 1997 (age 29)
- Place of birth: Be'er Sheva, Israel
- Height: 1.84 m (6 ft 1/2 in)
- Position: Right-back

Team information
- Current team: Hapoel Ramat Gan
- Number: 30

Youth career
- 2008–2009: Maccabi Be'er Sheva
- 2010–2011: Hapoel Be'er Sheva
- 2011–2013: Maccabi Be'er Sheva
- 2013–2017: Hapoel Be'er Sheva

Senior career*
Years	Team	Apps	(Gls)
2017–	Hapoel Be'er Sheva	101	(1)
2017–2019	→ Hapoel Bnei Lod (loan)	55	(1)
2023–2024	→ Aberdeen (loan)	0	(0)
2025	→ Ironi Kiryat Shmona (loan)	9	(0)
2026–	→ Hapoel Ramat Gan (loan)	14	(0)

International career^{‡}
2022–	Israel	1	(0)
- * Club domestic league appearances and goals as of 24 June 2026 ‡ National team caps and goals as of 16 January 2026

Or Dadia (or Dadya, Hebrew: אור דדיה; born 12 July 1997) is an Israeli professional footballer who plays as a right-back for Liga Leumit club Hapoel Ramat Gan and the Israel national team.

== Early life ==
Dadia was born in Be'er Sheva, Israel, to a Jewish family. He served as a soldier in the Israel Defense Forces.

== Career ==
=== Early career ===
Dadia grew up in the youth departments of Maccabi Be'er Sheva and Hapoel Be'er Sheva. On May 15, 2017, the 2016–17 season, he made his debut in Hapoel Be'er Sheva senior team in a 1–1 draw against Beitar Jerusalem at Teddy Stadium. On May 20 made his second appearance in a 0–2 win over Bnei Sakhnin at Turner Stadium, he won the championship with his team.

In the season of 2017–18, Dadia was loaned to Hapoel Bnei Lod from the Liga Leumit for two years. On August 8, 2017, he made his debut in the Toto Cup 4–1 loss to Hapoel Tel Aviv at Lod Municipal Stadium. On August 21 he made his debut as part of the Liga Leumit, winning 0–2 at Ironi Nesher at Lod Municipal Stadium. By the end of the season he had made 24 league appearances and finished with his team in tenth place. In the 2018–19 season, he finished ninth in the Liga Leumit with his team and made 31 league appearances and scored one goal.

On 21 July 2023, Scottish Premiership club Aberdeen announced that they had signed Dadia on a season-long loan with an exclusive option to purchase. Dadia left Aberdeen on 17 January 2024 without making a senior appearance.

=== International career ===
Dadia made his debut for the Israel national football team on 27 September 2022 in a friendly game against Malta.

== Career statistics ==
As of 16 January 2025

Club	Season	League	League		Cup		League Cup		Europe		Other		Total	
Club	Season	League	Apps	Goals	Apps	Goals	Apps	Goals	Apps	Goals	Apps	Goals	Apps	Goals
Hapoel Be'er Sheva	2016–17	Israeli Premier League	2	0	0	0	0	0	0	0	0	0	2	0
Hapoel Be'er Sheva	2019–20	Israeli Premier League	16	1	3	0	2	0	9	0	0	0	30	1
Hapoel Be'er Sheva	2020–21	Israeli Premier League	28	0	2	0	1	0	2	0	0	0	33	0
Hapoel Be'er Sheva	2021–22	Israeli Premier League	25	0	6	0	2	0	0	0	0	0	33	0
Hapoel Be'er Sheva	2022–23	Israeli Premier League	22	0	1	0	2	0	9	0	1	0	35	0
Hapoel Be'er Sheva	2023–24	Israeli Premier League	8	0	2	0	0	0	0	0	0	0	10	0
Hapoel Be'er Sheva	2024–25	Israeli Premier League	0	0	1	0	0	0	0	0	0	0	1	0
Hapoel Be'er Sheva	Total		101	1	15	0	7	0	20	0	1	0	144	1
Hapoel Bnei Lod (loan)	2017–18	Liga Leumit	24	0	1	0	2	0	–	–	0	0	27	0
Hapoel Bnei Lod (loan)	2018–19	Liga Leumit	31	1	1	0	0	0	–	–	0	0	32	1
Hapoel Bnei Lod (loan)	Total		55	1	2	0	2	0	–	–	0	0	59	0
Aberdeen (loan)	2023–24	Scottish Premiership	0	0	0	0	0	0	0	0	0	0	0	0
Ironi Kiryat Shmona (loan)	2024–25	Israeli Premier League	0	0	0	0	0	0	0	0	0	0	0	0
Career total			154	2	14	0	9	0	20	0	1	0	199	2

== Honours ==
Hapoel Be'er Sheva

- Israeli Premier League: 2016–17
- Israel State Cup: 2019–20, 2021–22
- Israel Super Cup: 2022

== See also ==
- List of Jewish footballers
- List of Jews in sports
- List of Israelis
