= David Keltjens =

Israeli footballer (born 1995)

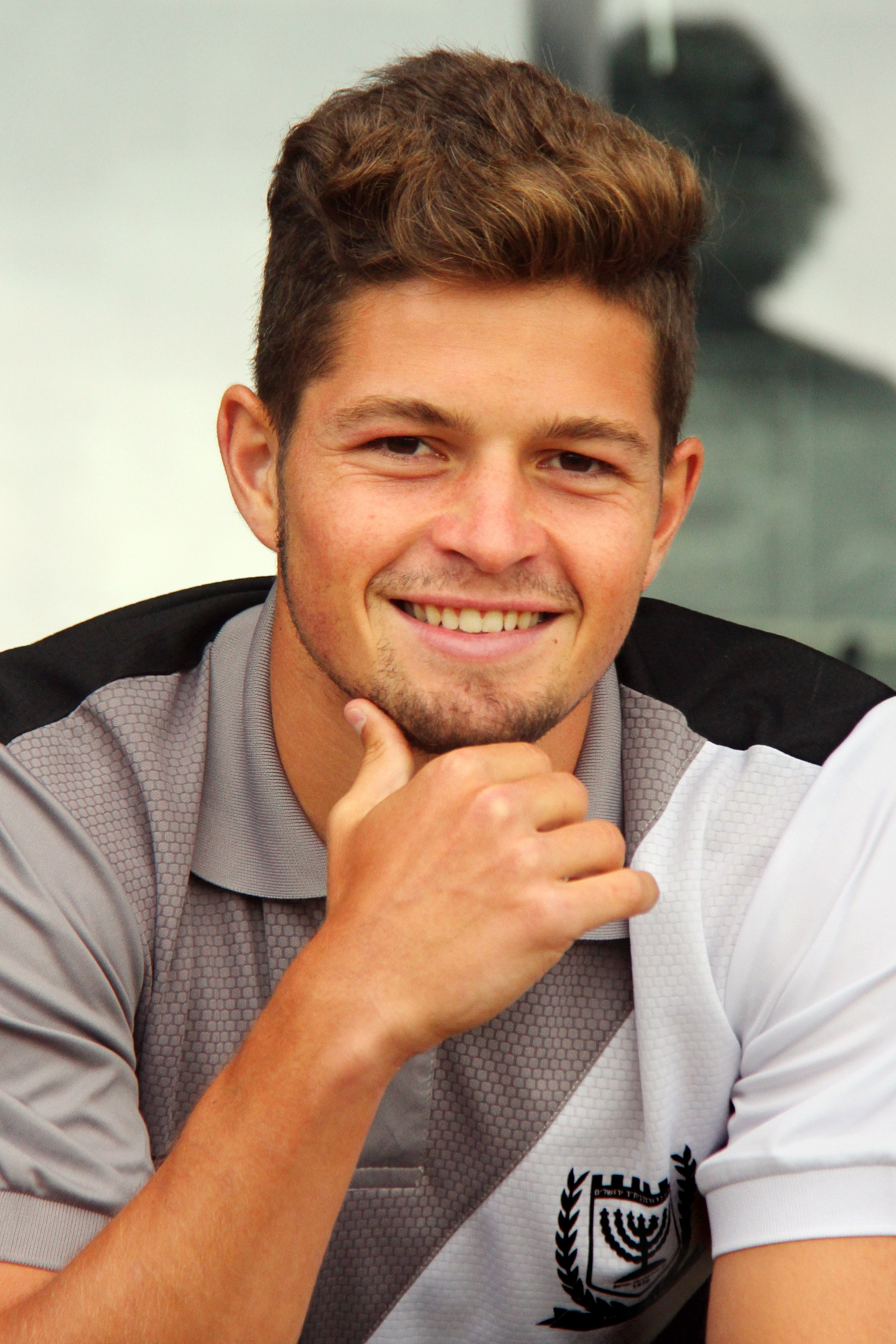
- Keltjens with Beitar Jerusalem in 2016

Personal information
- Full name: David Yair Keltjens
- Date of birth: 11 June 1995 (age 31)
- Place of birth: Mevaseret Zion, Israel
- Height: 1.81 m (5 ft 11 in)
- Positions: Defensive midfielder; right-back

Team information
- Current team: Ironi Tiberias
- Number: 3

Youth career
- 2007–2015: Beitar Jerusalem

Senior career*
Years	Team	Apps	(Gls)
2015–2019	Beitar Jerusalem	113	(4)
2019–2022	Hapoel Be'er Sheva	60	(2)
2022–2024	Hapoel Tel Aviv	23	(0)
2024–2025	St Johnstone	21	(1)
2025–	Ironi Tiberias	35	(1)

International career
2013	Israel U18	2	(0)
2013–2014	Israel U19	7	(0)
2016	Israel U21	6	(0)
2017	Israel	6	(0)
- * Club domestic league appearances and goals as of 24 June 2026

David Yair Keltjens (or Klatins, Hebrew: דוד יאיר קלטינס; born 11 June 1995) is an Israeli professional footballer who plays as a defensive midfielder or right-back for Israeli Premier League club Ironi Tiberias.

== Early and personal life ==
Keltjens was born in Mevaseret Zion, Israel; to his father Yossi Keltjens who is of Dutch origin; and to his mother Flori (née Ben-Harush) who is of Moroccan Jewish descent and hails from the neighborhood of Katamon in Jerusalem, Israel. He has a sister named Emily, and a brother named Michael. His late maternal grandfather was also a footballer in Morocco. He was enlisted and served in the Israel Defense Forces.

He also holds a Dutch passport, which eases the move to certain European football leagues.

He has been in a relationship with his Israeli girlfriend Yael Alexandra Gold since 2021.

== Club career ==
=== Beitar Jerusalem ===
From age 6 to 8, Keltjens was part of the Hapoel Tel Aviv Youth Academy. At the age of 12, he joined the Beitar Jerusalem youth system, where he eventually also made his senior debut for the senior club of Beitar Jerusalem in an Israeli Premier League away match against Maccabi Tel Aviv, which ended in a 2–4 victory for his team; on 26 October 2015.

=== Hapoel Be'er Sheva ===
On 25 June 2019, he signed with Israeli Premier League club Hapoel Be'er Sheva for five years.

On 9 January 2024, Keltjens signed for Scottish Premiership side St Johnstone on a deal until the end of the season. He was released on January 20, 2025.

== International career ==
On 6 November 2016, Keltjens was first called up to the senior Israel national team, ahead of their match against Albania. On 24 March 2017, he made his senior international debut, coming on as a 60th-minute substitute against Spain in a 2018 FIFA World Cup qualification (UEFA) away match that ended in a 2–4 defeat for his native Israel.

== Honours ==
Hapoel Be'er Sheva

- Israel State Cup: 2019–20, 2021–22
- Israel Super Cup: 2022

== See also ==
- List of Jewish footballers
- List of Jews in sports
- List of Israelis
