= Tomer Yosefi =

Israeli association footballer

Personal information
- Date of birth: 2 February 1999 (age 27)
- Place of birth: Lehavim, Israel
- Height: 1.82 m (5 ft 11 1/2 in)
- Position: Attacking midfielder

Team information
- Current team: Beitar Jerusalem
- Number: 10

Youth career
- 2010–2019: Hapoel Be'er Sheva

Senior career*
Years	Team	Apps	(Gls)
2019–2025	Hapoel Be'er Sheva	94	(9)
2023–2024	→ Hapoel Haifa (loan)	43	(13)
2025–2026	Polissya Zhytomyr	21	(3)
2026–	Beitar Jerusalem	0	(0)

International career
2019–2020	Israel U21	11	(3)
- * Club domestic league appearances and goals as of 24 June 2026

Tomer Yosefi (also spelled Josefi, Hebrew: תומר יוספי; born 2 February 1999) is an Israeli footballer who plays as an attacking midfielder for Beitar Jerusalem.

== Early life ==
Yosefi was born and raised in the affluent town of Lehavim, Israel, to an Israeli family of Jewish descent.

== Club career ==
Yosefi is a product of the youth divisions of Israeli club Hapoel Be'er Sheva. On 12 January 2019, during the 2018–19 Israeli Premier League season, Yosefi made his debut with the seniors of Hapoel Be'er Sheva in a home match against Maccabi Haifa. On 19 May 2019, Yosefi scored his first senior goal for Hapoel Be'er Sheba, coming on as a 84th-minute substitute as well as netting the late winner in just 4 minutes, in an Israeli Premier League 1–0 home victory over Hapoel Hadera.

== Career statistics ==
=== Club ===
As of 31 December 2024

Club	Season	League	League		Cup		League Cup		Europe		Other		Total	
Club	Season	League	Apps	Goals	Apps	Goals	Apps	Goals	Apps	Goals	Apps	Goals	Apps	Goals
Hapoel Be'er Sheva	2018–19	Israeli Premier League	9	1	1	0	–	–	–	–	0	0	10	1
Hapoel Be'er Sheva	2019–20	Israeli Premier League	17	2	3	0	1	0	2	0	1	0	24	2
Hapoel Be'er Sheva	2020–21	Israeli Premier League	28	5	1	0	–	–	10	0	2	0	41	5
Hapoel Be'er Sheva	2021–22	Israeli Premier League	33	1	5	0	2	0	4	0	0	0	44	1
Hapoel Be'er Sheva	2022–23	Israeli Premier League	5	0	0	0	0	0	8	1	1	0	14	1
Hapoel Be'er Sheva	2024–25	Israeli Premier League	2	0	0	0	1	0	4	1	0	0	7	1
Hapoel Be'er Sheva	Total		94	9	10	0	4	0	28	2	4	0	140	11
Hapoel Haifa (loan)	2022–23	Israeli Premier League	10	2	0	0	0	0	0	0	0	0	10	2
Hapoel Haifa (loan)	2023–24	Israeli Premier League	33	11	2	0	1	0	0	0	0	0	36	11
Hapoel Haifa (loan)	Total		43	13	2	0	1	0	0	0	0	0	46	13
Polissya Zhytomyr	2024–25	Ukrainian Premier League	0	0	0	0	–	–	0	0	–	–	0	0
Polissya Zhytomyr	Total		0	0	0	0	–	–	0	0	0	0	0	0
Career total			137	22	12	0	5	0	28	2	4	0	186	24

== Honours ==
=== Club ===
Hapoel Be'er Sheva

- Israel State Cup: 2019–20, 2021–22
- Israel Super Cup: 2022

== See also ==
- List of Jewish footballers
- List of Jews in sports
- List of Israelis
- List of Israel international footballers
