= Eyad Abu Abaid =

Israeli footballer

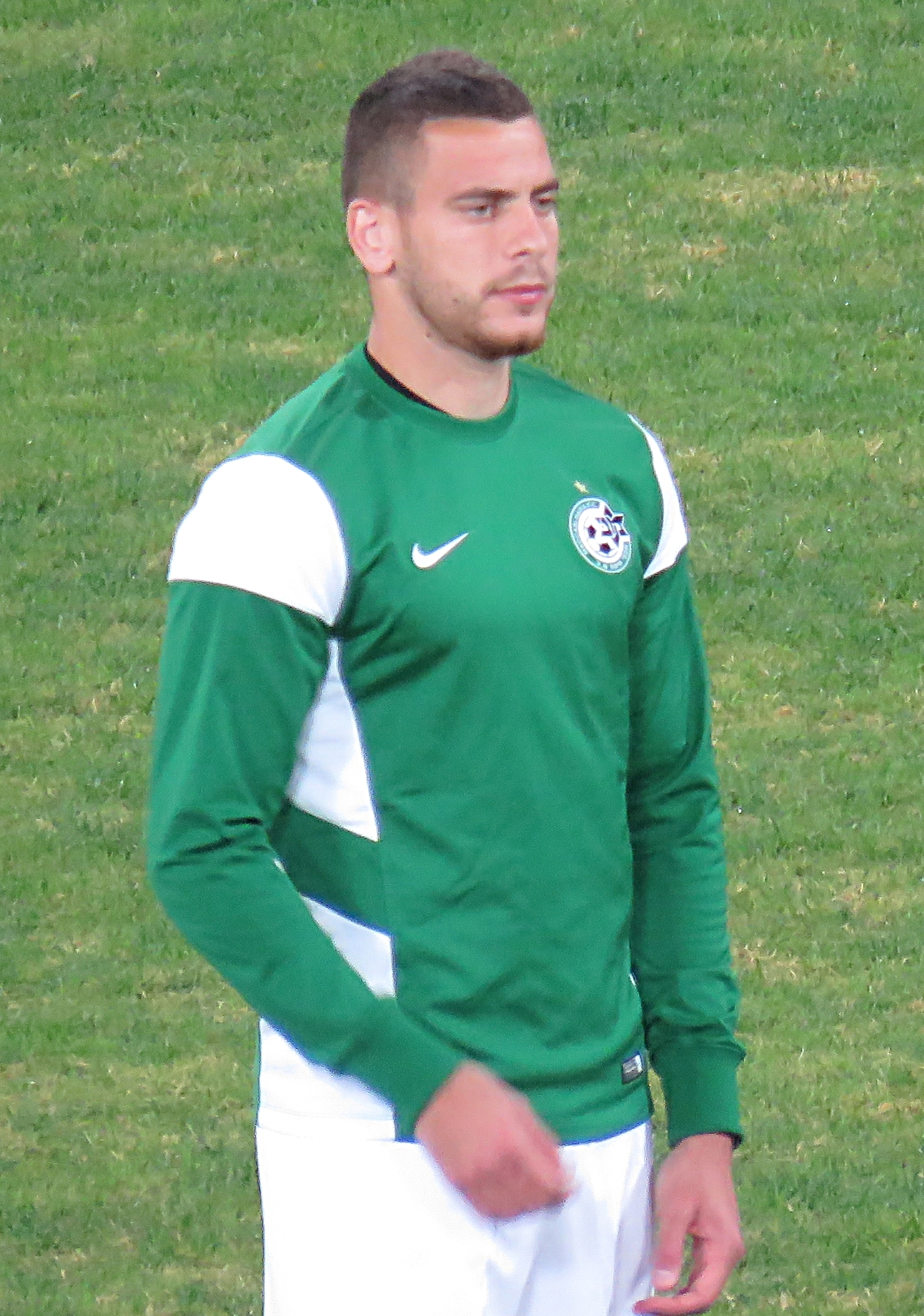
- Abu Abaid in 2016

Personal information
- Full name: Eyad Abu Abaid
- Date of birth: 31 December 1994 (age 31)
- Place of birth: Meiser, Israel
- Height: 1.83 m (6 ft 0 in)
- Positions: Right-back; centre-back

Team information
- Current team: Bnei Sakhnin
- Number: 5

Youth career
- Beitar Nes Tubruk

Senior career*
Years	Team	Apps	(Gls)
2014–2015	Maccabi Netanya	28	(1)
2015–2016	Hapoel Tel Aviv	28	(0)
2016–2017	Maccabi Haifa	10	(0)
2017–2019	Ironi Kiryat Shmona	54	(2)
2019–2021	Hapoel Tel Aviv	60	(2)
2021–2024	Hapoel Be'er Sheva	64	(4)
2024–2026	Bnei Sakhnin	46	(3)
2026	Maccabi Bnei Reineh	7	(0)
2026–	Bnei Sakhnin	0	(0)

International career^{‡}
2015–2016	Israel U21	8	(1)
2021–	Israel	6	(0)
- * Club domestic league appearances and goals as of 24 June 2026 ‡ National team caps and goals as of 13 June 2022 (UTC)

Eyad Abu Abaid (or Iyad, Arabic: إيَاد أَبُو عُبَيْد, Hebrew: איאד אבו עביד; born 31 December 1994) is an Israeli professional footballer who plays as a defender for Israeli Premier League club Bnei Sakhnin.

== Early life ==
Abu Abaid was born in the Arab village of Meiser, Israel.

== Club career ==
Abu Abaid made his debut for Maccabi Netanya on 12 August 2014 in a Toto Cup game against Maccabi Tel Aviv. Since then, he became a regular in the starting lineup.

On 25 June 2016, he signed for a three-year contract with Maccabi Haifa in which he played 16 matches.

On 8 June 2017, Abu Abaid signed a contract for Hapoel Ironi Kiryat Shmona.

== International career ==
He made his debut for the Israel national football team on 1 September 2021 in a World Cup qualifier against the Faroe Islands, a 4–0 away victory. He substituted Nir Bitton in the 84th minute.

== Honours ==
=== Club ===
Hapoel Be'er Sheva

- State Cup: 2021–22
- Super Cup: 2022
