= Hélder Lopes (footballer) =

Portuguese footballer

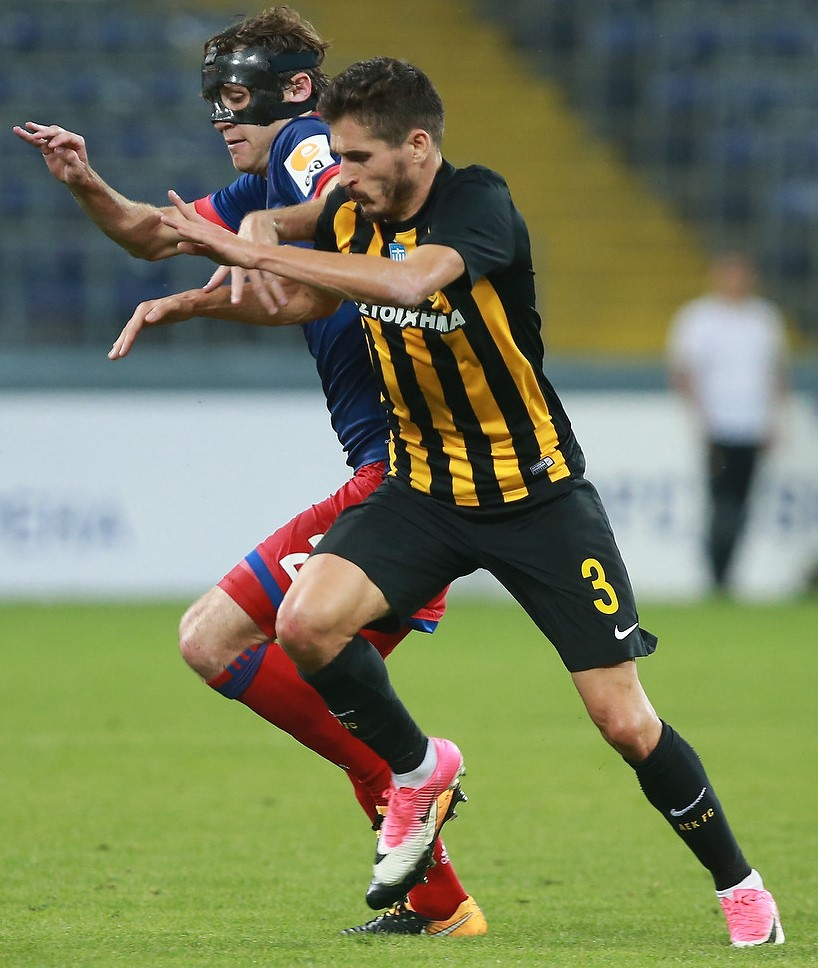
- Lopes with AEK Athens in 2017

Personal information
- Full name: Hélder Filipe Oliveira Lopes
- Date of birth: 4 January 1989 (age 37)
- Place of birth: Vila Nova de Gaia, Portugal
- Height: 1.79 m (5 ft 10 in)
- Position: Left-back

Team information
- Current team: Académica
- Number: 22

Youth career
- 2000–2005: Coimbrões
- 2005–2006: Padroense
- 2006–2008: Candal

Senior career*
Years	Team	Apps	(Gls)
2008	Parma	0	(0)
2009	Mirandela	7	(1)
2009–2010	Oliveira Douro	18	(2)
2010–2011	Espinho	28	(2)
2011–2012	Tondela	28	(0)
2012–2013	Beira-Mar	21	(0)
2013–2016	Paços Ferreira	80	(1)
2016–2017	Las Palmas	15	(0)
2017–2021	AEK Athens	77	(3)
2021–2026	Hapoel Be'er Sheva	151	(20)
2026–	Académica	9	(0)
- * Club domestic league appearances and goals as of 20:45, 21 November 2026 (UTC)

Hélder Filipe Oliveira Lopes (Portuguese pronunciation: [ˈɛldɛɾ fiˈlipɨ oliˈvɐjɾɐ ˈlɔpɨʃ]; born 4 January 1989) is a Portuguese professional footballer who plays as a left-back for Liga Portugal 2 club Académica.

He made 101 Primeira Liga appearances for Beira-Mar and Paços de Ferreira before spending the majority of his career abroad, featuring in La Liga with Las Palmas and winning national honours at AEK Athens and Hapoel Be'er Sheva.

== Club career ==
=== Portugal ===
Born in Vila Nova de Gaia, Porto District, Lopes spent his youth career at SC Coimbrões, Padroense F.C. and CD Candal, graduating from the latter in 2008. He moved abroad that summer, joining Parma F.C. but failing to make a single appearance for the club.

Returning to his homeland in January 2009, Lopes made his senior debut with SC Mirandela by starting in a 1–1 Segunda Divisão home draw against SC Maria da Fonte. He subsequently represented C.F. Oliveira do Douro, S.C. Espinho and C.D. Tondela, all in the lower leagues; with the latter team, he achieved promotion to the Segunda Liga.

Lopes signed a two-year deal with Primeira Liga side S.C. Beira-Mar on 5 July 2012. He made his professional debut on 30 September, coming on as a second-half substitute for Rúben Ribeiro in a 1–1 home draw with Vitória de Setúbal.

On 28 June 2013, Lopes was transferred to F.C. Paços de Ferreira also in the top tier. He scored his first goal as a professional on 3 January 2015, in a 1–2 home loss to Rio Ave FC.

=== Las Palmas ===
On 31 May 2016, Lopes agreed to a two-year contract with La Liga club UD Las Palmas. His competitive debut took place on 1 October, as he started and played 69 minutes in a 2–2 draw at CA Osasuna.

=== AEK Athens ===
On 21 June 2017, the free agent Lopes signed a two-year deal at AEK Athens FC. He made his official debut on 2 August, in a 1–0 away defeat against PFC CSKA Moscow in the second leg of the UEFA Champions League third qualifying round.

Lopes scored his first goal for the team on 6 January 2018, in a 4–1 victory over against Panetolikos F.C. after an assist from Masoud Shojaei. He appeared in 31 matches in all competitions in his first season, helping the club to win its first Super League Greece since 1994.

On 29 September 2018, in an away fixture against OFI Crete FC, Lopes suffered an anterior cruciate ligament injury. On 8 January 2019, he agreed to a contract extension until the summer of 2022.

=== Hapoel Be'er Sheva ===
In August 2021, Lopes joined Hapoel Be'er Sheva F.C. of the Israeli Premier League. In his first season, the team won the State Cup, with him scoring the decisive strike in the penalty shootout after a 2–2 final draw with Maccabi Haifa FC. On 16 July, they lifted the Super Cup, with him also on target as they won on the same method against the same adversary; in between the two honours, the option of a second year on his contract was exercised.

=== Later career ===
Lopes returned to Portugal on 4 August 2026, with the 37-year-old agreeing to a one-year contract at Liga Portugal 2 side Académica de Coimbra.

== Personal life ==
Lopes' twin brother, Tiago, was also a footballer and a defender.

== Career statistics ==
As of 22 May 2022

Club	Season	League			National cup (Note: Includes Taça de Portugal, Greek Football Cup, Israel State Cup)		League cup (Note: Includes Taça da Liga, Toto Cup)		Continental		Total	
Club	Season	Division	Apps	Goals	Apps	Goals	Apps	Goals	Apps	Goals	Apps	Goals
Beira-Mar	2012–13	Primeira Liga	21	0	1	0	4	0	—		26	0
Paços Ferreira	2013–14	Primeira Liga	19	0	1	0	3	0	4	0	27	0
Paços Ferreira	2014–15	Primeira Liga	30	1	2	1	0	0	—		32	2
Paços Ferreira	2015–16	Primeira Liga	31	0	2	1	0	0	—		33	1
Paços Ferreira	Total		80	1	5	2	3	0	4	0	92	3
Las Palmas	2016–17	La Liga	15	0	2	0	—		—		17	0
AEK Athens	2017–18	Super League Greece	19	1	4	1	—		8	0	31	2
AEK Athens	2018–19	Super League Greece	6	0	0	0	—		3	0	9	0
AEK Athens	2019–20	Super League Greece	23	1	5	0	—		3	0	31	1
AEK Athens	2020–21	Super League Greece	29	1	6	0	—		2	0	37	1
AEK Athens	2021–22	Super League Greece	0	0	0	0	—		2	0	2	0
AEK Athens	Total		77	3	15	1	—		18	0	110	4
Hapoel Be'er Sheva	2021–22	Israeli Premier League	28	1	3	0	1	0	0	0	32	1
Career total			221	5	26	3	8	0	22	0	277	8

== Honours ==
AEK Athens

- Super League Greece: 2017–18

Hapoel Be'er Sheva

- Israeli Premier League: 2025–26
- Israel State Cup: 2021–22, 2024–25
- Israel Super Cup: 2022, 2025
