= Hatem Abd Elhamed =

Israeli association footballer

Personal information
- Date of birth: 18 March 1991 (age 35)
- Place of birth: Kafr Manda, Israel
- Height: 1.86 m (6 ft 1 in)
- Position: Defender

Team information
- Current team: Bnei Sakhnin
- Number: 44

Youth career
- 2007–2009: Bnei Sakhnin
- 2009–2010: Maccabi Tel Aviv

Senior career*
Years	Team	Apps	(Gls)
2010–2011	Maccabi Tel Aviv	0	(0)
2010–2011	→ Charleroi	1	(0)
2011–2015	Ashdod	79	(1)
2015	→ Dinamo București	13	(3)
2015–2017	Gent	1	(0)
2016–2017	→ Ashdod	27	(0)
2017–2019	Hapoel Be'er Sheva	50	(4)
2019–2021	Celtic	13	(0)
2021–2023	Hapoel Be'er Sheva	42	(0)
2022–2023	→ Hapoel Haifa	22	(1)
2023–2024	Hapoel Haifa	12	(2)
2024	Ironi Tiberias	8	(0)
2025–	Bnei Sakhnin	13	(0)

International career
2009	Israel U18	2	(0)
2009	Israel U19	8	(1)
2017–2021	Israel	16	(0)
- * Club domestic league appearances and goals as of 1 June 2025

Hatem Abd Elhamed (or Elhamid, Arabic: حاتم عبد الحميد, Hebrew: חאתם עבד אלחמד; born 18 March 1991) is an Israeli professional footballer who plays as a defender for Bnei Sakhnin and the Israel national team.

== Early life ==
Elhamed was born in Kafr Manda, Israel, to a Muslim-Arab family. His younger brother Muhammad died in a car accident in 2008.

== Club career ==
=== Early career ===
Abd Hamed started playing football at the age of 16 in the youth teams of Bnei Sakhnin. He did this for two years, and he was transferred to Maccabi Tel Aviv in 2009. He played one season in the youth series. In the 2010/11 season, he signed a professional contract in his team Maccabi Tel Aviv FC. Abd Elhamed made his professional debut on 8 August 2010 in a Toto Cup match against his boyhood club, Bnei Sakhnin.

On 1 February 2011, Abd Elhamid was loaned to Charleroi in Belgium. A month later, he made his league debut for Charleroi, coming on as a substitute for Ederson in the 73rd minute against Standard Liège on 12 March 2011. Charleroi had stipulated a purchase option, but did not purchase the player.

=== Ashdod ===
The next season, he was transferred to F.C. Ashdod, a team in the First Division. In his first season, he started 8 times in the basic team, and he was 15 times a substitute. In the following 2012–13 season, he became a regular player in the team. He was 20 times in the starting team and two times a substitute. On 6 January 2013, he scored his first professional goal at the age of 21. This game against Maccabi Haifa ended in a 4–1 defeat. In his third season (2013/14), he was 17 times in the starting team and four times a substitute.

In summer 2014, he started his fourth season at Ashdod. The first sixteen matches of the competition, he was 12 times on the field, of which 7 times in the basic team. Nevertheless, it was decided to send him on loan to the Romenian team Dinamo Bucharest.

His period on loan at the Romanian top team was his second passage outside Israel. He was directly selected for the first team in 13 of the last 17 matches, almost every time as a starting player. On 24 April, he scored his first goal in the team, in a 1–1 draw against Cluj. In May, the last month of the season, he made scored more goals and gave two assists. However, Dinamo Bucharest was not willing to pay the transfer sum of €100,000, so Elhamed returned to Israel. In June 2015, he started a trial at Club Brugge.

In July 2015, he signed until mid-2019 at Belgian side K.A.A. Gent. On 15 July 2016 loaned back to F.C. Ashdod.

=== Hapoel Be'er Sheva ===
In August 2017, he signed a five-year contract at Hapoel Be'er Sheva.

=== Celtic ===
On 24 July 2019, Scottish champions Celtic announced the signing of Abd Elhamed from Hapoel Be’er Sheva on a four-year contract. Celtic manager Neil Lennon said in February 2021 that Abd Elhamed had been suffering from homesickness, as his family was still living in Israel and he was unable to visit them due to the COVID-19 pandemic.

=== Return to Be'er Sheva ===
Abd Elhamed returned to Hapoel Be'er Sheva in February 2021.

== International career ==
In 2009, Abd Elhamed was selected to represent Israel at the 2009 Maccabiah Games.

He made his Israel national football team debut on 10 June 2019 in a Euro 2020 qualifier against Poland, as an 82nd-minute substitute for Nir Bitton.

In October 2020, Abd Elhamed tested positive for COVID-19 while away on international duty.

== Career statistics ==
As of match played 1 June 2024

Appearances and goals by club, season and competition
Club	Season	League			Cup		League Cup		Continental		Total	
Club	Season	Division	Apps	Goals	Apps	Goals	Apps	Goals	Apps	Goals	Apps	Goals
Maccabi Tel Aviv	2010–11	Liga Ha'Al	0	0	0	0	1	0	0	0	1	0
Charleroi (loan)	2010–11	Pro League	1	0	0	0	0	0	0	0	1	0
Ashdod	2011–12	Ligat Ha'Al	23	0	2	0	1	0	0	0	26	0
Ashdod	2012–13	Ligat Ha'Al	22	1	0	0	2	0	0	0	24	1
Ashdod	2013–14	Ligat Ha'Al	21	0	1	0	-	-	0	0	22	0
Ashdod	2014–15	Ligat Ha'Al	13	0	0	0	5	0	0	0	18	0
Ashdod Total			79	1	3	0	8	0	0	0	90	1
Dinamo București (loan)	2014–15	Liga I	13	3	0	0	2	0	0	0	15	3
Gent	2015–16	Pro League	1	0	1	0	0	0	0	0	2	0
Ashdod (loan)	2016–17	Ligat HaAl	27	0	4	0	5	0	0	0	36	0
Hapoel Be'er Sheva	2017–18	Ligat HaAl	23	1	4	0	5	1	7	0	39	2
Hapoel Be'er Sheva	2018–19	Ligat HaAl	26	3	1	0	0	0	0	0	27	3
Hapoet Be'er Sheva Total			49	4	5	0	5	1	7	0	66	5
Celtic	2019–20	Scottish Premiership	5	0	1	0	3	0	6	0	15	0
Celtic	2020–21	Scottish Premiership	8	0	0	0	1	0	6	0	15	0
Celtic	Celtic Total		13	0	1	0	4	0	12	0	30	0
Hapoel Be'er Sheva	2020–21	Ligat HaAl	9	0	1	0	0	0	0	0	10	0
Hapoel Be'er Sheva	2021–22	Ligat HaAl	30	0	3	0	1	0	2	0	36	0
Hapoel Be'er Sheva	2022–23	Ligat HaAl	3	0	1	0	0	0	4	0	8	0
Hapoel Be'er Sheva	2023–24	Ligat HaAl	2	0	0	0	1	0	0	0	3	0
Hapoet Be'er Sheva Total			44	0	5	0	2	0	6	0	57	0
Hapoel Haifa	2022–23	Ligat HaAl	22	1	0	0	0	0	0	0	22	1
Hapoel Haifa	2023–24	Ligat HaAl	12	2	1	0	0	0	0	0	13	2
Hapoel Haifa Total			34	3	1	0	0	0	0	0	35	3
Ironi Tiberias	2024–25	Ligat HaAl	8	0	0	0	0	0	0	0	8	0
Ironi Tiberias Total			8	0	0	0	0	0	0	0	8	0
Bnei Sakhnin	2024–25	Ligat HaAl	0	0	0	0	0	0	0	0	0	0
Bnei Sakhnin Total			0	0	0	0	0	0	0	0	0	0
Career Total			261	8	20	0	27	1	25	0	322	7

== Honours ==
Hapoel Be'er Sheva

- Premier League (1): 2017–18
- State Cup (1): 2021–22
- Super Cup (1): 2022

Celtic

- Premiership (1): 2019–20
