= 2022 Israel Super Cup =

Maccabi Haifa	Hapoel Be'er Sheva
1	1
- Hapoel Be'er Sheva won 4–3 on penalties
- Date: 16 July 2022
- Venue: Sammy Ofer Stadium, Haifa
- Referee: Roi Reinshreiber
- Attendance: 27,420

The 2022 Israel Super Cup was the 27th edition of the Israel Super Cup (32nd, including unofficial matches (Note: The competition wasn't played within the Israel Football Association for its first 5 editions, until 1969.)), an annual Israeli football match played between the winners of the previous season's Israeli Premier League (Maccabi Haifa) and the Israel State Cup (Hapoel Be'er Sheva). This will be the seventh edition since the Super cup's resumption in 2015.

== Match details ==
16 July 2022
20:30

Maccabi Haifa	1–1	Hapoel Be'er Sheva
Atzili 1', (yellow card) 76'; Haziza (yellow card) 41'	Report	(yellow card) 45' Bareiro; (yellow card) 56', (goal) 70' Ansah; (yellow card) 75' Dadia
Penalties
Chery (penalty scored); Abu Fani (penalty scored); Atzili (penalty missed); David (penalty scored); Pierrot (penalty missed)	3–4	(penalty missed) Madmon; (penalty scored) Lopes; (penalty scored) Yosefi; (penalty scored) Dadia; (penalty scored) Hemed

Sammy Ofer Stadium, Haifa
Referee: Roi Reinshreiber

Maccabi Haifa	Hapoel Be'er Sheva

GK	44	(United States) Josh Cohen
RB	2	(Sweden) Daniel Sundgren
CB	5	(Serbia) Bogdan Planić
CB	3	(Israel) Sean Goldberg
LB	27	(France) Pierre Cornud (substituted off) 60'
DM	26	(Israel) Mahmoud Jaber (substituted off) 46'
CM	4	(Niger) Ali Mohamed
LM	6	(Israel) Neta Lavi (c) (substituted off) 75'
LW	8	(Israel) Dolev Haziza (substituted off) 46'
RW	7	(Israel) Omer Atzili
CF	13	(Israel) Nikita Rukavytsya (substituted off) 60'
Substitutes:
GK	40	(Israel) Shareef Kayouf
DF	36	(Israel) Inon Eliyahu
DF	15	(Israel) Ofri Arad
DF	12	(Israel) Sun Menachem (substituted on) 60'
DF	33	(Israel) Maor Levi
MF	10	(Suriname) Tjaronn Chery (substituted on) 75'
MF	16	(Israel) Mohammad Abu Fani (substituted on) 46'
FW	9	(Haiti) Frantzdy Pierrot (substituted on) 60'
FW	21	(Israel) Dean David (substituted on) 46'
Manager:
(Israel) Barak Bakhar

GK	55	(Israel) Omri Glazer
RB	30	(Israel) Or Dadia (substituted off) 63'
CB	5	(Israel) Hatem Abd Elhamed
CB	18	(Israel) Miguel Vitor (c)
LB	22	(Portugal) Hélder Lopes
CM	35	(Argentina) Mariano Bareiro (substituted off) 63'
CM	19	(Israel) Shay Elias (substituted off) 46'
CM	28	(Israel) André Martins (substituted off) 78'
RW	10	(Israel) Dor Micha (substituted off) 70'
LW	'77	(Israel) Rotem Hatuel (substituted off) 46'
CF	31	(Ghana) Eugene Ansah
Substitutes:
GK	1	(Israel) Ariel Harush
DF	18	(Israel) Eitan Tibi
MF	15	(Israel) Tomer Yosefi (substituted on) 70'
MF	3	(Israel) David Keltjens (substituted on) 78'
FW	9	(Israel) Itay Shechter
FW	11	(Israel) Sagiv Yehezkel (substituted on) 46'
MF	14	(Israel) Ilay Madmon (substituted on) 63'
FW	17	(Israel) Tomer Hemed (substituted on) 46'
MF	27	(Israel) Yoni Stoyanov
Manager:
(Israel) Elianiv Barda

Man of the Match:

MATCH OFFICIALS
Assistant referees:
Dudu Biton
Sagi Metzamber
Fourth official:
Eitan Shmuelevitz
Video assistant referee:
David Foxman
Assistant video assistant referee:
Idan Bernstein

Match rules

- 90 minutes.
- Nine named substitutes, of which up to five may be used.
