= Sagiv Yehezkel =

Israeli footballer (born 1995)

Personal information
- Full name: Sagiv Shalom Yehezkel
- Date of birth: 21 March 1995 (age 31)
- Place of birth: Rishon LeZion, Israel
- Height: 1.84 m (6 ft 0 in)
- Positions: Right-back; winger

Team information
- Current team: Maccabi Tel Aviv
- Number: 11

Youth career
- 2003–2010: Hapoel Tel Aviv
- 2010–2013: Maccabi Tel Aviv
- 2013–2014: Hapoel Tel Aviv

Senior career*
Years	Team	Apps	(Gls)
2014–2016	Hapoel Tel Aviv	39	(7)
2016–2019	Maccabi Tel Aviv	9	(0)
2017–2018	→ Ironi Kiryat Shmona (loan)	15	(0)
2018–2019	→ Bnei Yehuda Tel Aviv (loan)	11	(1)
2019	→ F.C. Ashdod (loan)	9	(3)
2019–2021	F.C. Ashdod	51	(15)
2021–2023	Hapoel Be'er Sheva	58	(12)
2023–2024	Antalyaspor	13	(6)
2024–	Maccabi Tel Aviv	45	(7)

International career^{‡}
2012	Israel U17	2	(1)
2012	Israel U18	5	(1)
2013–2014	Israel U19	15	(2)
2015	Israel U21	2	(0)
2022–	Israel	13	(0)
- * Club domestic league appearances and goals as of 23 June 2026 ‡ National team caps and goals as of 9 September 2025

Sagiv Shalom Yehezkel (or Jehezkel, Hebrew: שגיב שלום יחזקאל; born 21 March 1995) is an Israeli professional footballer who plays as a right-back and winger for Israeli Premier League club Maccabi Tel Aviv and the Israel national team.

In January 2024, while with Turkish Süper Lig side Antalyaspor, Yehezkel was suspended and then sacked for making a gesture of support for Israeli hostages being held during the Gaza war after he scored a goal against Trabzonspor.

== Early and personal life ==
Yehezkel was born and raised in Rishon LeZion, Israel, to a family of Israeli-Jewish descent.

He married his Israeli fiancée Elian (née Yosef) on 23 June 2022, in moshav Shoresh, Israel. Their firstborn son was born in June 2023.

== Club career ==
During his early career, Yehezkel played for Hapoel Tel Aviv and then Maccabi Tel Aviv, and had loan spells at Ironi Kiryat Shmona, Bnei Yehuda Tel Aviv and F.C. Ashdod before joining the latter in 2019.

On 11 February 2021, Yehezkel transferred to Israeli Premier League club Hapoel Be'er Sheva on a three-and-a-half-year contract. He made his debut for the side on 13 February 2021, when he was in the starting line-up in a 2–2 league draw away at Hapoel Haifa.

Yehezkel signed with Turkish Süper Lig club Antalyaspor on 15 September 2023, on a three-season contract running until 30 June 2026. Yehezkel made his debut with Antalyaspor just two days later, in an away league match against Fenerbahçe, coming on as a 54th-minute substitute, and providing an assist for his new club's second equaliser. But after just four months with Antalyaspor, Yehezkel's contract was terminated early.

=== '100 days' incident ===
On 14 January 2024, Yehezkel scored a 68th-minute goal in Antalyaspor's Süper Lig match against Trabzonspor. He celebrated by showing writing on a wrist bandage saying "100 days, 7-10", referring to the Israeli hostages being held by Hamas for 100 days since the October 7 attacks. His actions were condemned by Turkey's Minister of Justice Yılmaz Tunç and the Turkish Football Federation (TFF), and he was suspended by Antalyaspor, while the club's sponsor said his contract should be terminated. Israeli officials criticised Turkey's actions towards Yehezkel, who was arrested after the match for what Tunç called "the crime of publicly inciting public hatred and hostility due to his ugly action supporting the massacre committed by Israel in Gaza". According to local media, Yehezkel protested his innocence saying: "I did not do anything to provoke or provoke anyone. I am not a pro-war person.... The point I wanted to draw attention to was the end of the war." The player's goal celebration was initially shared on Antalyaspor social media accounts but was later removed.

On 15 January 2024, after being detained overnight, Yehezkel appeared in court charged with incitement to hatred. After being released pending trial, Yehezkel and his family flew to Israel, arriving at Ben Gurion Airport in Tel Aviv. According to The Guardian, Antalyaspor sacked Yehezkel, accusing him of having "acted against the values of our country"; the BBC confirmed Antalyaspor had sacked him, noting it was unclear if he faced prosecution if he returned to Turkey. The TFF had referred Yehezkel to the Professional Football Disciplinary Board for potential breaches of Article 42 of the Football Disciplinary Instruction, citing "ideological propaganda", for which an eight-match ban could be imposed and applied worldwide.

In July 2024, Yehezkel rejoined Maccabi Tel Aviv, signing a three-year deal.

== Honours ==
Hapoel Be'er Sheva

- Israel State Cup: 2021–22
- Israel Super Cup: 2022
