= Mohamed Kalil Traoré =

Guinean footballer

Personal information
- Date of birth: 9 July 2000 (age 26)
- Place of birth: Guinea
- Position: Defender

Team information
- Current team: Stade Beaucairois

Senior career*
Years	Team	Apps	(Gls)
2020–2021	Kamsar		
2021–2022	Hapoel Tel Aviv	17	(0)
2023–	Stade Beaucairois	41	(1)

International career^{‡}
2021–	Guinea	5	(0)
- * Club domestic league appearances and goals as of 7 December 2024 ‡ National team caps and goals as of 00:11, 26 March 2021 (UTC)

Mohamed Kalil Traoré (born 9 July 2000) is a Guinean professional footballer who plays as a defender for French Championnat National 3 club Stade Beaucairois and the Guinea national team.

== Club career ==
=== Early career ===
Traoré grew up and played in Guinean top flight club Kamsar.

=== Hapoel Tel Aviv ===
On 13 July 2021, Traoré joined Israeli Premier League club Hapoel Tel Aviv on a five-year contract, following a successful pre-season trial. He made his league debut in Israel on 28 August 2021.

== International career ==
Traoré made his debut with the Guinea national team in a 3–0 2020 African Nations Championship win over Namibia on 19 January 2021.
