= Eugene Ansah =

Ghanaian footballer

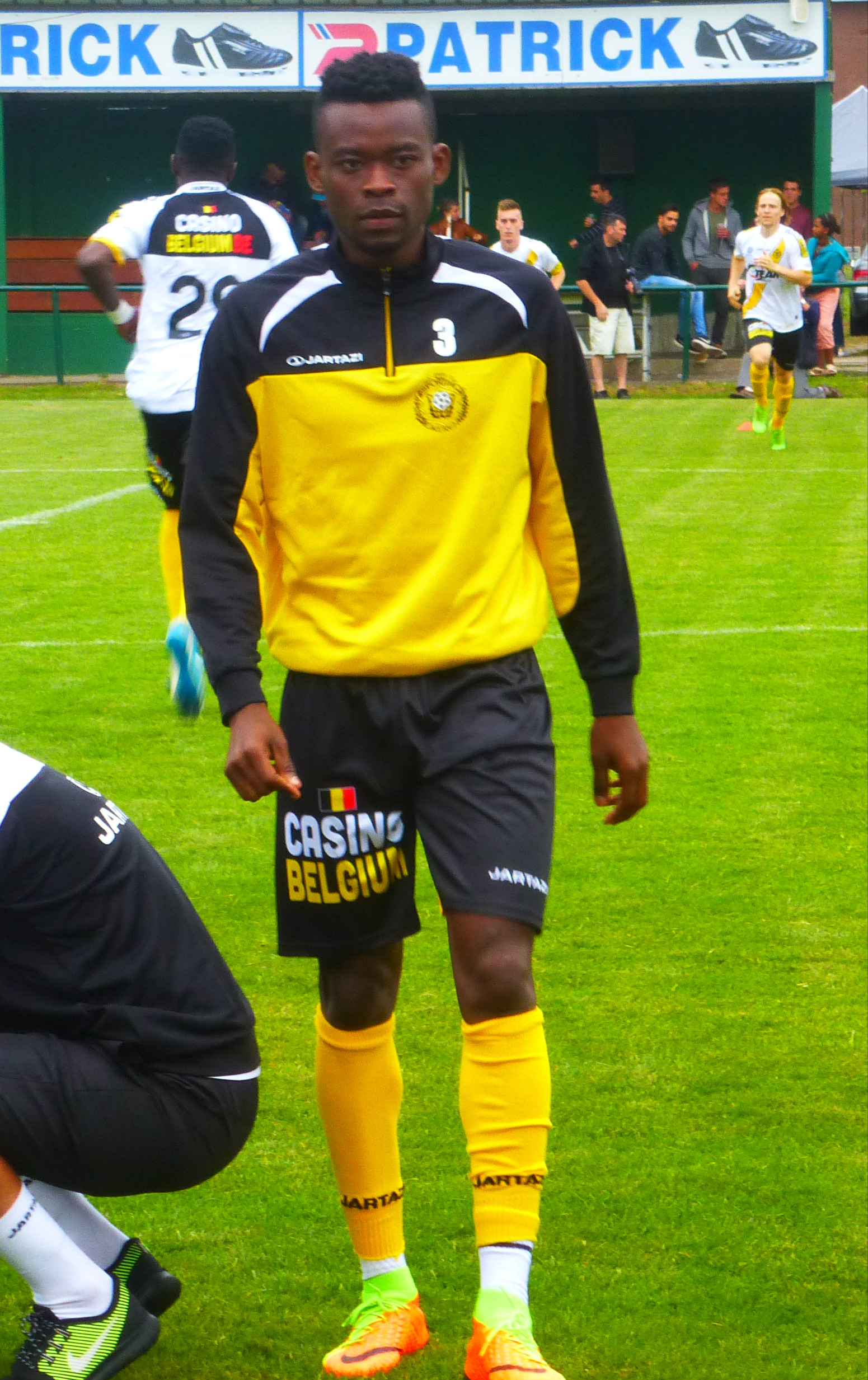

Personal information
- Full name: Eugene Ansah
- Date of birth: 16 December 1994 (age 31)
- Place of birth: Accra, Ghana
- Height: 1.82 m (5 ft 11 1/2 in)
- Position: Forward

Team information
- Current team: Beitar Jerusalem

Youth career
- Lokeren

Senior career*
Years	Team	Apps	(Gls)
2013–2017	Lokeren	36	(4)
2016	→ Lommel SK (loan)	13	(2)
2017–2019	Beitar Tel Aviv Ramla	45	(15)
2019–2021	Hapoel Ra'anana	45	(12)
2020–2021	→ Ironi Kiryat Shmona (loan)	33	(10)
2021–2023	Hapoel Be'er Sheva	55	(7)
2023–2024	FC Dallas	25	(2)
2025–2026	Ashdod	31	(9)
2026–	Beitar Jerusalem	0	(0)

International career^{‡}
2020	Ghana	1	(0)
- * Club domestic league appearances and goals as of 13 June 2026 ‡ National team caps and goals as of 24 May 2022

Eugene Ansah (born 16 December 1994) is a Ghanaian footballer who plays as a forward for Beitar Jerusalem.

== Club career ==
On 21 June 2021, Ansah joined in the Israeli Premier League club Hapoel Be'er Sheva F.C. after having an impressive season with Ironi Kiryat Shmona. On 19 June 2023, Ansah signed to FC Dallas on a one-and-a-half-year contract with a club option for the 2025 season. He was released by Dallas following their 2024 season.

== International career ==
Ansah debuted with the senior Ghana national team in a 3–0 friendly loss to Mali on 9 October 2020.

== Career statistics ==
=== Club ===
As of match played 8 September 2024

Appearances and goals by club, season and competition
Club	Season	League			National cup		Continental		Other		Total	
Club	Season	Division	Apps	Goals	Apps	Goals	Apps	Goals	Apps	Goals	Apps	Goals
Lokeren	2013-14	Belgian Pro League	10	1	2	0	—		—		12	1
Lokeren	2014-15	Belgian Pro League	11	2	1	0	1 (Note: Appearance(s) in UEFA Europa League)	0	1 (Note: Appearance(s) in Belgian Super Cup)	0	14	2
Lokeren	2015-16	Belgian Pro League	11	1	1	1	—		—		12	2
Lokeren	2016-17	Belgian Pro League	4	0	1	0	—		0	0	5	0
Lokeren	Total		36	4	5	1	1	0	1	0	43	5
Lommel (loan)	2015-16	Belgian Second Division	13	2	—		—		—		13	2
Maccabi Netanya	2017-18	Israeli Premier League	—		—		—		1 (Note: Appearance(s) in Toto Cup)	0	1	0
Beitar Tel Aviv Ramla	2017-18	Liga Leumit	29	10	—		—		—		29	10
Beitar Tel Aviv Ramla	2018-19	Liga Leumit	16	5	1	0	—		—		17	5
Beitar Tel Aviv Ramla	Total		45	15	1	0	—		—		46	15
Hapoel Ra'anana	2018-19	Israeli Premier League	11	5	—		—		—		11	5
Hapoel Ra'anana	2019-20	Israeli Premier League	31	5	3	2	—		4	0	38	7
Hapoel Ra'anana	Total		42	10	3	2	—		4	0	49	12
Ironi Kiryat Shmona (loan)	2020-21	Israeli Premier League	33	10	1	0	—		—		34	10
Hapoel Be'er Sheva	2021-22	Israeli Premier League	29	2	6	1	6 (Note: Appearance(s) in UEFA Europa Conference League)	3	3	1	44	7
Hapoel Be'er Sheva	2022-23	Israeli Premier League	26	5	0	0	12	0	2 (Note: One appearance, one goal in Israel Super Cup, One appearance in Toto Cup)	1	40	6
Hapoel Be'er Sheva	Total		55	7	6	1	18	3	5	2	84	13
FC Dallas	2023	MLS	11	1	—		4 (Note: Appearance(s) in Leagues Cup)	2	—		15	3
FC Dallas	2024	MLS	16	1	1	0	2	0	—		19	1
FC Dallas	Total		27	2	1	0	6	2	—		34	4
Career Total			251	50	17	4	25	5	11	2	304	61

== Honours ==
Lokeren

- Belgian Cup: 2013–14

Hapoel Be'er Sheva

- Israel State Cup: 2021–22
- Israel Super Cup: 2022
