= Ramzi Safouri =

Israeli footballer (born 1995)

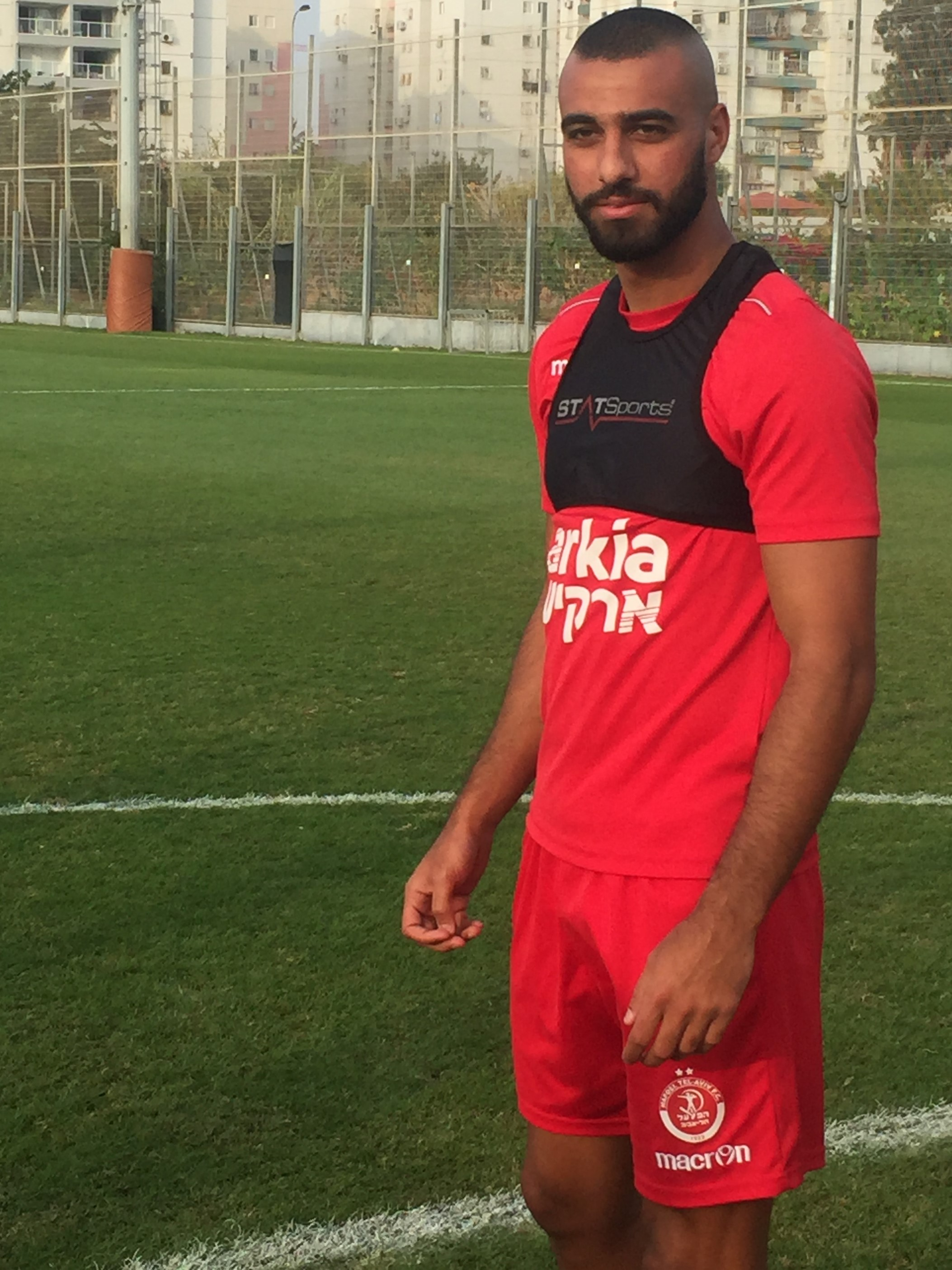
- Safuri with Hapoel Tel Aviv in 2018

Personal information
- Date of birth: 21 October 1995 (age 31)
- Place of birth: Jaffa, Tel Aviv, Israel
- Height: 1.83 m (6 ft 0 in)
- Positions: Attacking midfielder; winger

Team information
- Current team: Antalyaspor
- Number: 8

Youth career
- Hapoel Tel Aviv

Senior career*
Years	Team	Apps	(Gls)
2013–2019	Hapoel Tel Aviv	93	(16)
2016–2017	→ Bnei Sakhnin (loan)	32	(3)
2017–2018	→ Hapoel Ashkelon (loan)	17	(1)
2018	→ Maccabi Netanya (loan)	13	(2)
2019–2023	Hapoel Be'er Sheva	98	(22)
2021	→ Ashdod (loan)	13	(3)
2023–	Antalyaspor	83	(5)

International career^{‡}
2010–2011	Israel U16	9	(1)
2011–2012	Israel U17	12	(4)
2012–2013	Israel U18	7	(2)
2012–2014	Israel U19	17	(3)
2013–2016	Israel U21	6	(0)
2022–	Israel	17	(1)
- * Club domestic league appearances and goals as of 10 June 2026 ‡ National team caps and goals as of 14 October 2024

Ramzi Safouri (sometimes Safury or Safuri, Arabic: رَمْزِيّ سَفُورِيّ, Hebrew: רמזי ספורי; born 21 October 1995) is an Israeli professional footballer who plays as an attacking midfielder or winger for Süper Lig club Antalyaspor and the Israel national team.

== Early life ==
Safouri was born in Jaffa, Tel Aviv, Israel, to a Muslim-Arab family.

== Club career ==
Safouri signed with Süper Lig club Antalyaspor, on 14 September 2023, on a two-season contract until 30 June 2025.

== International career ==
Safouri was youth international for Israel since 2010, where he first played for U-16.

He debuted for the Israel senior national team in a friendly match against Germany on 26 March 2022, coming on as a 74th-minute substitute in 2–0 loss.

== International goals ==
No.	Date	Venue	Opponent	Score	Result	Competition
1.	11 June 2024	Szusza Ferenc Stadion, Budapest, Hungary	Belarus	2–0	4–0	Friendly

== Honours ==
Hapoel Be'er Sheva

- State Cup: 2019–20, 2021–22
- Super Cup: 2022
