= Rotem Hatuel =

Israeli footballer (born 1998)

Personal information
- Date of birth: 12 April 1998 (age 28)
- Place of birth: Hatzor HaGlilit, Israel
- Height: 1.78 m (5 ft 10 in)
- Position: Winger

Team information
- Current team: Hapoel Haifa
- Number: 9

Youth career
- 2008–2009: Hapoel Hazor
- 2009–2012: Maccabi Haifa
- 2012–2018: Ironi Kiryat Shmona

Senior career*
| Years | Team | Apps | (Gls) |
| 2017–2019 | Ironi Kiryat Shmona | 14 | (2) |
| 2019–2019 | → Hapoel Acre (loan) | 11 | (0) |
| 2019–2020 | Hapoel Umm al-Fahm | 15 | (2) |
| 2020–2020 | Maccabi Akhi Nazareth | 14 | (4) |
| 2020–2025 | Hapoel Be'er Sheva | 107 | (27) |
| 2025–2025 | → Hapoel Tel Aviv (loan) | 15 | (1) |
| 2025–2026 | Hapoel Haifa | 26 | (3) |
| 2026– | F.C. Kafr Qasim | | |

International career^{‡}
| 2015–2016 | Israel U18 | 5 | (0) |
| 2016 | Israel U19 | 2 | (0) |
| 2022– | Israel | 1 | (0) |
- * Club domestic league appearances and goals as of 24 June 2026 ‡ National team caps and goals as of 02:47, 4 February 2026 (UTC)

Rotem Hatuel (Hebrew: רותם חטואל; born 12 April 1998) is an Israeli professional footballer who plays as a winger for Israeli Premier League club Hapoel Haifa and the Israel national team.

== Early life ==
Hatuel was born and raised in Hatzor HaGlilit, Israel, to an Israeli family of Jewish descent.

== career ==
On August 8, 2019, Hatuel signed with Hapoel Ramat HaSharon from the Liga Leumit but left the team after a month without appearing once for the team and moved to Hapoel Umm al-Fahm from the Liga Leumit.

== International career ==
Hatuel made his debut for the Israel national team on 27 September 2022 in a friendly game against Malta.

== Honours ==
Hapoel Be'er Sheva

- Israel State Cup: 2021–22
- Israel Super Cup: 2022
