= 2021–22 Israeli Premier League =

Israeli Premier League
- Season: 2021–22
- Dates: 28 August 2021 – 22 May 2022
- Champions: Maccabi Haifa
- Relegated: Maccabi Petah Tikva; Hapoel Nof HaGalil
- Champions League: Maccabi Haifa
- Europa Conference League: Hapoel Be'er Sheva; Maccabi Tel Aviv; Maccabi Netanya
- Matches: 240
- Goals: 593 (2.47 per match)
- Top goalscorer: Omer Atzili (20 goals)
- Biggest home win: Maccabi Haifa 6–0 F.C. Ashdod (7 February 2022)
- Biggest away win: Bnei Sakhnin 0–6 Maccabi Haifa (25 December 2021)
- Highest scoring: Hapoel Nof HaGalil 2–6 Ironi Kiryat Shmona (8 January 2022)
- Longest winning run: 10 — Maccabi Haifa (Note: Matches 9–18)
- Longest unbeaten run: 16 — Hapoel Be'er Sheva (Note: Matches 1–16); Maccabi Haifa (Note: Matches 6–21)
- Longest winless run: 13 — Maccabi Petah Tikva (Note: Matches 8–20)
- Longest losing run: 6 — Hapoel Nof HaGalil (Note: Matches 12–17); Maccabi Petah Tikva
- All statistics correct as of 22 May 2022.

The 2021–22 Israeli Premier League, also known as Ligat Tel Aviv Stock Exchange for sponsorship reasons, was the 23rd season since its introduction in 1999 and the 80th season of top-tier football in Israel.

== Teams ==
A total of fourteen teams were competing in the league, including twelve sides from the 2020–21 season and two promoted teams from the 2020–21 Liga Leumit.

Hapoel Nof HaGalil and Hapoel Jerusalem were promoted from the 2020–21 Liga Leumit. Hapoel Nof HaGalil and Hapoel Jerusalem returned to the top flight after an absence of 15 and 21 years respectively.

Hapoel Kfar Saba and Bnei Yehuda were relegated to the 2021–22 Liga Leumit after finishing the 2020–21 Israeli Premier League in the bottom two places.

=== Members of the 2021–22 season ===
Locations of the 2020–22 Israeli Premier League teams

=== Stadiums and locations ===
Team	Location	Stadium	Capacity
Beitar Jerusalem	Jerusalem	Teddy Stadium	31,733
Bnei Sakhnin	Sakhnin	Doha Stadium	8,500
F.C. Ashdod	Ashdod	Yud-Alef Stadium	7,800
Hapoel Be'er Sheva	Be'er Sheva	Turner Stadium	16,126
Hapoel Hadera	Hadera	Netanya Stadium	13,610
Hapoel Haifa	Haifa	Sammy Ofer Stadium	30,950
Hapoel Jerusalem	Jerusalem	Teddy Stadium	31,733
Hapoel Nof HaGalil	Nof HaGalil	Green Stadium	5,200
Hapoel Tel Aviv	Tel Aviv	Bloomfield Stadium	29,400
Ironi Kiryat Shmona	Kiryat Shmona	Kiryat Shmona Stadium	5,300
Maccabi Haifa	Haifa	Sammy Ofer Stadium	30,950
Maccabi Netanya	Netanya	Netanya Stadium	13,610
Maccabi Petah Tikva	Petah Tikva	HaMoshava Stadium	11,500
Maccabi Tel Aviv	Tel Aviv	Bloomfield Stadium	29,400

Beitar Jerusalem Hapoel Jerusalem	Hapoel Tel Aviv Maccabi Tel Aviv	Ironi Kiryat Shmona	Hapoel Nof HaGalil
Teddy Stadium	Bloomfield Stadium	Kiryat Shmona Stadium	Green Stadium
Maccabi Netanya Hapoel Hadera	Hapoel Haifa Maccabi Haifa	Maccabi Petah Tikva	
Netanya Stadium	Sammy Ofer Stadium	HaMoshava Stadium	
F.C. Ashdod	Bnei Sakhnin	Hapoel Be'er Sheva	
Yud-Alef Stadium	Doha Stadium	Turner Stadium	

=== Managerial changes ===
Team	Outgoing manager	Manner of departure	Date of vacancy	Position in table	Incoming manager	Date of appointment
Ironi Kiryat Shmona	(Israel) Kobi Refua	End of contract	30 May 2021	Pre-season	(Israel) Amir Nussbaum	31 May 2021
Beitar Jerusalem	(Israel) Yossi Mizrahi	End of caretaking spell	2 June 2021	Pre-season	(Netherlands) Erwin Koeman	2 June 2021
Maccabi Netanya	(Netherlands) Raymond Atteveld	Sacked	29 September 2021	14th	(Israel) Benyamin Lam	4 October 2021
Maccabi Tel Aviv	(Netherlands) Patrick van Leeuwen	Sacked	26 October 2021	12th	(Israel) Barak Yitzhaki (caretaker)	26 October 2021
Ironi Kiryat Shmona	(Israel) Amir Nussbaum	Sacked	8 November 2021	14th	(Serbia) (Israel) Slobodan Drapić	9 November 2021
Beitar Jerusalem	(Netherlands) Erwin Koeman	Resigned	1 December 2021	11th	(Israel) Yossi Mizrahi	10 December 2021
Maccabi Tel Aviv	(Israel) Barak Yitzhaki (caretaker)	End of caretaking spell	9 December 2021	4th	(Serbia) Mladen Krstajić	9 December 2021
Hapoel Tel Aviv	(Israel) Nir Klinger	Sacked	19 December 2021	7th	(Israel) Kobi Refua	19 December 2021
Maccabi Petah Tikva	(Israel) Guy Luzon	Resigned	28 December 2021	14th	(Israel) Nir Klinger	29 December 2021
Hapoel Nof HaGalil	(Israel) Yaron Hochenboim	Sacked	5 January 2022	13th	(Israel) Shay Barda	5 January 2022
Bnei Sakhnin	(Israel) Sharon Mimer	Sacked	18 January 2022	6th	(Israel) Haim Silvas	19 January 2022
Beitar Jerusalem	(Israel) Yossi Mizrahi	Resigned	26 January 2022	11th	(Israel) Gal Cohen (caretaker)	26 January 2022
Beitar Jerusalem	(Israel) Gal Cohen (caretaker)	End of caretaking spell	3 February 2022	11th	(Israel) Yossi Abukasis	3 February 2022
Hapoel Be'er Sheva	(Israel) Ronny Levy	Sacked	1 March 2022	2nd	(Israel) Elyaniv Barda	1 March 2022

=== Foreign players ===
The number of foreign players were restricted to six per team, while only five could have been registered to a game.

Club	Player 1	Player 2	Player 3	Player 4	Player 5	Player 6	Non-visa player
Beitar Jerusalem	(Venezuela) **Josua Mejías**	(Ghana) **Richmond Boakye**	(Guinea) **Kamso Mara**	(Suriname) **Gleofilo Vlijter**			
Bnei Sakhnin	(Brazil) Ari Moura	(Croatia) Ante Puljić	(Nigeria) Odah Marshall	(Guinea) **Ibrahima Conté**	(Uganda) **Fahad Bayo**	(Netherlands) Fabian Sporkslede	(France) Gaëtan Varenne (Palestine) **Abdallah Jaber**
F.C. Ashdod	(Ghana) Montari Kamaheni	(Ghana) Lawrence Ofori	(Serbia) Nenad Cvetković	(Uganda) **Timothy Awany**	(Greece) **Dimitrios Diamantakos**	(Cameroon) Martin Atemengue	(United States) **Kenny Saief**
Hapoel Be'er Sheva	(Colombia) Danilo Asprilla	(Ghana) **Eugene Ansah**	(Italy) Davide Petrucci	(Portugal) Hélder Lopes	(Portugal) André Martins	(Brazil) Gustavo Marmentini	(Argentina) Mariano Bareiro (Australia) **Nikita Rukavytsya**
Hapoel Hadera	(Ivory Coast) Jonathan Cissé	(Bulgaria) Ivaylo Markov	(Nigeria) Steven Alfred	(Nigeria) Muhammed Usman			
Hapoel Haifa	(The Gambia) Saikou Touray	(Slovenia) Alen Ožbolt	(Serbia) Matija Ljujić	(Nigeria) **Izuchuckwu Anthony**			
Ironi Kiryat Shmona	(England) Morgan Ferrier	(Lithuania) **Džiugas Bartkus**	(Slovakia) Július Szöke				
Hapoel Jerusalem	(Ivory Coast) Yao Eloge Koffi	(Czech Republic) Ondřej Bačo	(Panama) **Eduardo Guerrero**	(Nigeria) Adebayo Adeleye	(Nigeria) William Agada	(Nigeria) Bright Enobakhare	(Ethiopia) Awaka Eshata
Hapoel Nof HaGalil	(Brazil) Guti	(Liberia) **David Tweh**	(Nigeria) **John Ogu**	(New Zealand) **Stefan Marinovic**	(Uganda) **Luwagga Kizito**	(Cameroon) **Ernest Mabouka**	
Hapoel Tel Aviv	(Montenegro) **Marko Janković**	(Brazil) Farley Rosa	(Guinea) **Mohamed Kalil Traoré**	(Lithuania) **Ernestas Šetkus**	(South Africa) **Siyanda Xulu**	(France) Ange-Freddy Plumain	(Ukraine) Bohdan Sarnavskyi
Maccabi Haifa	(Guadeloupe) **Mickaël Alphonse**	(Spain) José Rodriguez	(Ghana) Godsway Donyoh	(Niger) **Ali Mohamed**	(Serbia) Bogdan Planić	(Suriname) **Tjaronn Chery**	(United States) Josh Cohen (Republic of the Congo) **Mavis Tchibota** (Australia) Ryan Strain
Maccabi Netanya	(Bulgaria) **Plamen Galabov**	(Cameroon) Boris Enow	(Ghana) **Patrick Twumasi**	(Serbia) Zlatan Šehović	(Serbia) Igor Zlatanović	(Ivory Coast) Parfait Guiagon	
Maccabi Petah Tikva	(Brazil) Marcus Diniz	(Bosnia and Herzegovina) Adi Mehremić	(Nigeria) James Adeniyi	(Moldova) **Ion Nicolaescu**	(Zambia) Lameck Banda		(Argentina) Nico Olsak (Argentina) Marco Wolff (Ukraine) Daniel Joulani
Maccabi Tel Aviv	(Croatia) Stipe Perica	(Curaçao) **Brandley Kuwas**	(Portugal) Josué Sá	(Spain) Enric Saborit	(Serbia) Đorđe Jovanović	(Portugal) André Geraldes	(Brazil) Daniel Tenenbaum

In bold: Players that have been capped for their national team.

== Regular season ==
=== Regular season table ===
Pos	Team	Pld	W	D	L	GF	GA	GD	Pts	Qualification or relegation
1	Maccabi Haifa	26	18	5	3	62	19	+43	59	Qualification for the Championship round
2	Hapoel Be'er Sheva	26	16	7	3	39	17	+22	55	Qualification for the Championship round
3	Maccabi Tel Aviv	26	16	5	5	48	31	+17	53	Qualification for the Championship round
4	Bnei Sakhnin	26	12	6	8	28	29	−1	42	Qualification for the Championship round
5	Maccabi Netanya	26	10	10	6	34	27	+7	40	Qualification for the Championship round
6	Hapoel Tel Aviv	26	10	8	8	36	31	+5	38	Qualification for the Championship round
7	Hapoel Hadera	26	9	9	8	22	28	−6	36	Transfer to the Relegation round
8	Ironi Kiryat Shmona	26	9	6	11	29	32	−3	33	Transfer to the Relegation round
9	Hapoel Haifa	26	8	6	12	33	37	−4	30	Transfer to the Relegation round
10	F.C. Ashdod	26	8	3	15	28	44	−16	27	Transfer to the Relegation round
11	Hapoel Jerusalem	26	5	8	13	19	35	−16	23	Transfer to the Relegation round
12	Beitar Jerusalem	26	5	7	14	23	36	−13	22	Transfer to the Relegation round
13	Maccabi Petah Tikva	26	5	6	15	27	37	−10	21	Transfer to the Relegation round
14	Hapoel Nof HaGalil	26	4	8	14	20	45	−25	20	Transfer to the Relegation round

Source: Soccerway
Rules for classification: 1) Points; 2) Goal difference; 3) Matches won; 4) Goals scored; 5) Head-to-head points; 6) Head-to-head goal difference; 7) Head-to-head goals scored; 8) Play-off.

=== Regular season results ===
Home \ Away	MHA	HBS	MTA	BnS	MNE	HTA	HAH	IKS	HHA	ASH	HJE	BEI	MPT	HNG
Maccabi Haifa	—	1–2	3–2	2–1	2–0	2–0	1–0	4–0	5–1	6–0	1–1	2–1	2–0	1–1
Hapoel Be'er Sheva	1–2	—	2–0	3–0	0–1	2–1	2–2	0–0	3–1	1–1	3–1	3–1	1–0	2–0
Maccabi Tel Aviv	2–1	1–0	—	1–1	2–2	1–1	3–0	1–0	2–0	0–2	1–0	3–1	1–1	1–1
Bnei Sakhnin	0–6	0–0	3–1	—	1–3	1–0	1–0	0–3	2–2	0–1	2–1	2–0	1–0	2–0
Maccabi Netanya	1–1	1–1	4–2	1–0	—	1–1	0–2	3–1	1–0	0–1	2–0	0–0	2–0	1–3
Hapoel Tel Aviv	1–3	1–1	2–3	0–3	2–2	—	0–1	2–0	0–2	2–1	1–1	1–0	2–1	2–2
Hapoel Hadera	0–0	1–2	0–2	2–1	1–1	0–3	—	2–0	1–0	2–1	0–0	1–0	1–4	0–0
Ironi Kiryat Shmona	2–1	1–2	1–3	0–1	2–1	0–2	0–1	—	2–2	2–0	0–0	2–2	1–0	1–0
Hapoel Haifa	0–1	0–1	1–3	1–1	0–0	0–2	3–0	1–0	—	2–1	1–2	5–1	2–2	3–1
F.C. Ashdod	2–2	1–1	1–3	0–1	1–3	1–4	1–2	0–2	1–3	—	1–0	2–0	3–4	3–0
Hapoel Jerusalem	1–4	0–1	1–3	0–0	2–1	0–1	1–1	0–1	1–1	2–0	—	0–3	1–0	3–1
Beitar Jerusalem	0–1	0–2	1–2	1–1	1–1	0–2	0–0	1–1	2–1	0–2	3–0 (Note: The match between Beitar Jerusalem and Hapoel Jerusalem originally ended 1–1. However, Beitar was awarded a 3–0 victory after Hapoel ineligibly fielded 6 foreign players during the match (a team is allowed to field at most 5 foreign players in a match).)	—	2–1	0–0
Maccabi Petah Tikva	0–4	0–1	1–2	0–1	1–1	1–1	1–1	1–1	2–0	0–1	3–1	0–3	—	4–0
Hapoel Nof HaGalil	0–4	0–2	1–3	1–2	0–1	2–2	1–1	2–6	0–1	2–0	0–0	1–0	1–0	—

Source: "Ligat Ha'Al – Matches".
Legend: Blue = home team win; Yellow = draw; Red = away team win.

=== Results by round ===
Team ╲ Round	1	2	3	4	5	6	7	8	9	10	11	12	13	14	15	16	17	18	19	20	21	22	23	24	25	26
Maccabi Haifa	D	W	L	W	L	W	W	D	W	W	W	W	W	W	W	W	W	W	D	D	W	L	W	W	D	W
Hapoel Be'er Sheva	W	D	D	W	W	W	W	D	D	W	W	W	W	W	W	W	L	L	W	W	L	D	D	D	W	W
Maccabi Tel Aviv	L	D	W	L	W	L	L	W	D	W	D	W	W	D	W	L	W	W	D	W	W	W	W	W	W	W
Bnei Sakhnin	W	L	D	D	L	W	L	W	D	W	W	L	W	D	L	L	W	L	L	W	W	D	W	D	W	W
Maccabi Netanya	D	L	D	L	W	W	L	D	L	W	L	L	D	W	W	D	D	W	D	D	W	W	D	W	W	D
Hapoel Tel Aviv	W	W	D	L	D	W	W	L	D	L	L	D	D	W	W	W	W	D	W	L	L	L	L	D	W	D
Hapoel Hadera	D	D	D	W	W	W	L	L	D	D	D	W	L	L	L	D	D	W	W	W	W	D	W	L	L	L
Ironi Kiryat Shmona	D	L	L	W	D	L	W	L	L	L	W	W	W	W	L	D	W	D	L	L	L	W	D	D	L	W
Hapoel Haifa	D	W	W	W	L	W	L	W	D	L	L	L	D	L	W	D	L	D	W	W	L	D	L	L	L	L
F.C. Ashdod	L	L	L	W	L	L	W	D	D	W	W	W	L	L	L	W	W	L	W	L	L	D	L	L	L	L
Hapoel Jerusalem	D	L	D	D	L	L	L	W	W	L	L	D	D	W	L	D	L	L	D	L	L	L	W	D	L	W
Beitar Jerusalem	L	W	D	L	D	L	W	L	W	D	L	L	L	L	W	D	L	D	L	L	D	W	L	D	L	L
Maccabi Petah Tikva	D	D	D	L	W	L	W	L	L	L	D	L	L	L	L	L	L	D	L	L	W	L	D	W	W	L
Hapoel Nof HaGalil	D	W	W	L	D	L	L	W	D	L	D	L	L	L	L	L	L	D	L	W	D	D	L	L	D	L

Source: soccerway
W = Win; D = Draw; L = Loss

== Championship round ==
Key numbers for pairing determination (number marks position after 26 games)

Rounds
27th	28th	29th	30th	31st	32nd	33rd	34th	35th	36th
1 – 6; 2 – 5; 3 – 4	1 – 2; 5 – 3; 6 – 4	2 – 6; 3 – 1; 4 – 5	1 – 4; 2 – 3; 6 – 5	3 – 6; 4 – 2; 5 – 1	6 – 1; 5 – 2; 4 – 3	2 – 1; 3 – 5; 4 – 6	6 – 2; 1 – 3; 5 – 4	3 – 2; 4 – 1; 5 – 6	6 – 3; 2 – 4; 1 – 5

=== Championship round table ===
Pos	Team	Pld	W	D	L	GF	GA	GD	Pts	Qualification	MHA	HBS	MTA	MNE	HTA	BnS
1	Maccabi Haifa (C)	36	24	6	6	79	27	+52	78	Qualification for the Champions League second qualifying round	—	2–0	1–3	4–0	3–0	1–0
2	Hapoel Be'er Sheva	36	20	10	6	53	30	+23	70	Qualification for the Europa Conference League second qualifying round	1–0	—	1–0	4–1	2–2	3–1
3	Maccabi Tel Aviv	36	20	9	7	63	38	+25	69	Qualification for the Europa Conference League second qualifying round	1–1	1–1	—	2–1	5–0	0–0
4	Maccabi Netanya	36	13	13	10	47	41	+6	52	Qualification for the Europa Conference League second qualifying round	3–0	3–0	1–1	—	0–0	3–0
5	Hapoel Tel Aviv	36	13	11	12	44	47	−3	50		0–2	2–1	0–2	2–0	—	2–1
6	Bnei Sakhnin	36	13	10	13	33	43	−10	49		0–3	1–1	1–0	1–1	0–0	—

Source: Soccerway
Legend: Blue = home team win; Yellow = draw; Red = away team win.
Rules for classification: 1) Points; 2) Goal difference; 3) Matches won; 4) Goals scored; 5) Head-to-head points; 6) Head-to-head goal difference; 7) Head-to-head goals scored; 8) Play-off.
(C) Champions

=== Results by round ===
The table lists the results of teams in each round.

Team ╲ Round	27	28	29	30	31	32	33	34	35	36
Maccabi Haifa	W	W	D	W	L	W	L	L	W	W
Hapoel Be'er Sheva	W	L	D	W	D	L	W	L	D	W
Maccabi Tel Aviv	D	D	D	L	W	L	W	W	D	W
Maccabi Netanya	L	D	D	L	W	W	L	W	D	L
Hapoel Tel Aviv	L	W	D	W	L	L	D	W	D	L
Bnei Sakhnin	D	L	D	L	D	W	D	L	L	L

Source: "Ligat Ha'Al – Matches".
W = Win; D = Draw; L = Loss

== Relegation round ==
Key numbers for pairing determination (number marks position after 26 games)

Rounds
27th	28th	29th	30th	31st	32nd	33rd
7 – 11; 8 – 13; 9 – 12; 10 – 14	11 – 14; 12 – 10; 13 – 9; 7 – 8	8 – 11; 9 – 7; 10 – 13; 14 – 12	11 – 12; 13 – 14; 7 – 10; 8 – 9	9 – 11; 10 – 8; 14 – 7; 12 – 13	11 – 13; 7 – 12; 8 – 14; 9 – 10	10 – 11; 14 – 9; 12 – 8; 13 – 7

=== Relegation round table ===
Pos	Team	Pld	W	D	L	GF	GA	GD	Pts	Relegation	IKS	HAH	ASH	BEI	HHA	HJE	MPT	HNG
7	Ironi Kiryat Shmona	33	14	8	11	48	39	+9	50						4–0	2–1	1–1	2–0
8	Hapoel Hadera	33	11	9	13	34	43	−9	42		1–4		2–3	1–2		3–1		
9	F.C. Ashdod	33	12	3	18	37	52	−15	39		1–3					0–1	1–0	2–0
10	Beitar Jerusalem	33	9	10	14	35	43	−8	37		3–3		1–0				2–2	
11	Hapoel Haifa	33	9	8	16	36	47	−11	35			1–0	1–2	1–1		0–2		
12	Hapoel Jerusalem	33	8	9	16	25	41	−16	33					0–1			1–0	0–0
13	Maccabi Petah Tikva (R)	33	6	9	18	34	49	−15	27	Relegation to Liga Leumit		4–3			0–0			0–4
14	Hapoel Nof HaGalil (R)	33	6	9	18	25	53	−28	27	Relegation to Liga Leumit		0–2		0–2	1–0			

Source: Soccerway
Legend: Blue = home team win; Yellow = draw; Red = away team win.
Rules for classification: 1) Points; 2) Goal difference; 3) Matches won; 4) Goals scored; 5) Head-to-head points; 6) Head-to-head goal difference; 7) Head-to-head goals scored; 8) Play-off.
(R) Relegated

=== Results by round ===
The table lists the results of teams in each round
Team ╲ Round	27	28	29	30	31	32	33
Ironi Kiryat Shmona	D	W	W	W	W	W	D
Hapoel Hadera	W	L	L	L	W	L	L
F.C. Ashdod	W	L	W	W	L	W	L
Beitar Jerusalem	D	W	W	W	D	W	D
Hapoel Haifa	D	D	W	L	L	L	L
Hapoel Jerusalem	L	D	L	L	W	W	W
Maccabi Petah Tikva	D	D	L	W	D	L	W
Hapoel Nof HaGalil	L	D	L	W	L	L	W

Source: "Ligat Ha'Al – Relegation Round – Matches".
W = Win; D = Draw; L = Loss

== Season statistics ==
=== Top scorers ===
Rank	Player	Club	Goals
1	(Israel) Omer Atzili	Maccabi Haifa	20
2	(Israel) Dean David	Maccabi Haifa	15
2	(Israel) Itamar Shviro	Ironi Kiryat Shmona	15
2	(Croatia) Stipe Perica	Maccabi Tel Aviv	15
5	(Serbia) Igor Zlatanović	Maccabi Netanya	12
6	(Slovenia) Alen Ožbolt	Hapoel Haifa	11
6	(Israel) Alon Turgeman	Hapoel Haifa	11
8	(Australia) Nikita Rukavytsya	Hapoel Be'er Sheva	10
8	(Israel) Ramzi Safouri	Hapoel Be'er Sheva	10
10	(Israel) Guy Melamed	Bnei Sakhnin	9
10	(Israel) Dolev Haziza	Maccabi Haifa	9
10	(Suriname) Tjaronn Chery	Maccabi Haifa	9
10	(Serbia) Đorđe Jovanović	Maccabi Tel Aviv	9

Source, as of 17 May 2022:

=== Hat-tricks ===
Player	For	Against	Result	Date	Round
(Slovenia) Alen Ožbolt	Hapoel Haifa	Beitar Jerusalem	5–1 (H)	29 January 2022	20
(Israel) Omer Atzili^{4}	Maccabi Haifa	F.C. Ashdod	6–0 (H)	7 February 2022	21
