= Mariano Bareiro =

Argentine professional footballer

Personal information
- Full name: Lucas Mariano Bareiro
- Date of birth: 8 March 1995 (age 31)
- Place of birth: Buenos Aires, Argentina
- Height: 1.82 m (5 ft 11 1/2 in)
- Positions: Defensive midfielder; centre back

Senior career*
Years	Team	Apps	(Gls)
2016–2021	Racing Club	3	(0)
2016–2019	→ Defensa y Justicia	41	(3)
2019–2020	→ Huracán	22	(0)
2020–2021	→ Hapoel Be'er Sheva	28	(2)
2021–2024	Hapoel Be'er Sheva	114	(7)

International career
2015–2021	Argentina U20	2	(0)
- * Club domestic league appearances and goals as of 00:42, 15 March 2024 (UTC)

Lucas Mariano Bareiro (born 8 March 1995) is an Argentine professional footballer who plays as a midfielder.

== Personal life ==
In November 2020, Bareiro revealed to the staff at Hapoel Be'er Sheva that his maternal grandmother was Jewish. Bareiro applied shortly after for Israeli citizenship via the Law of Return and received it on 12 January 2021.

== Honours ==
Argentina U-20

- South American Youth Football Championship (1): 2015

Hapoel Be'er Sheva

- State Cup (1): 2021–22
- Super Cup (1): 2022
