= Dolev Haziza =

Israeli footballer (born 1995)

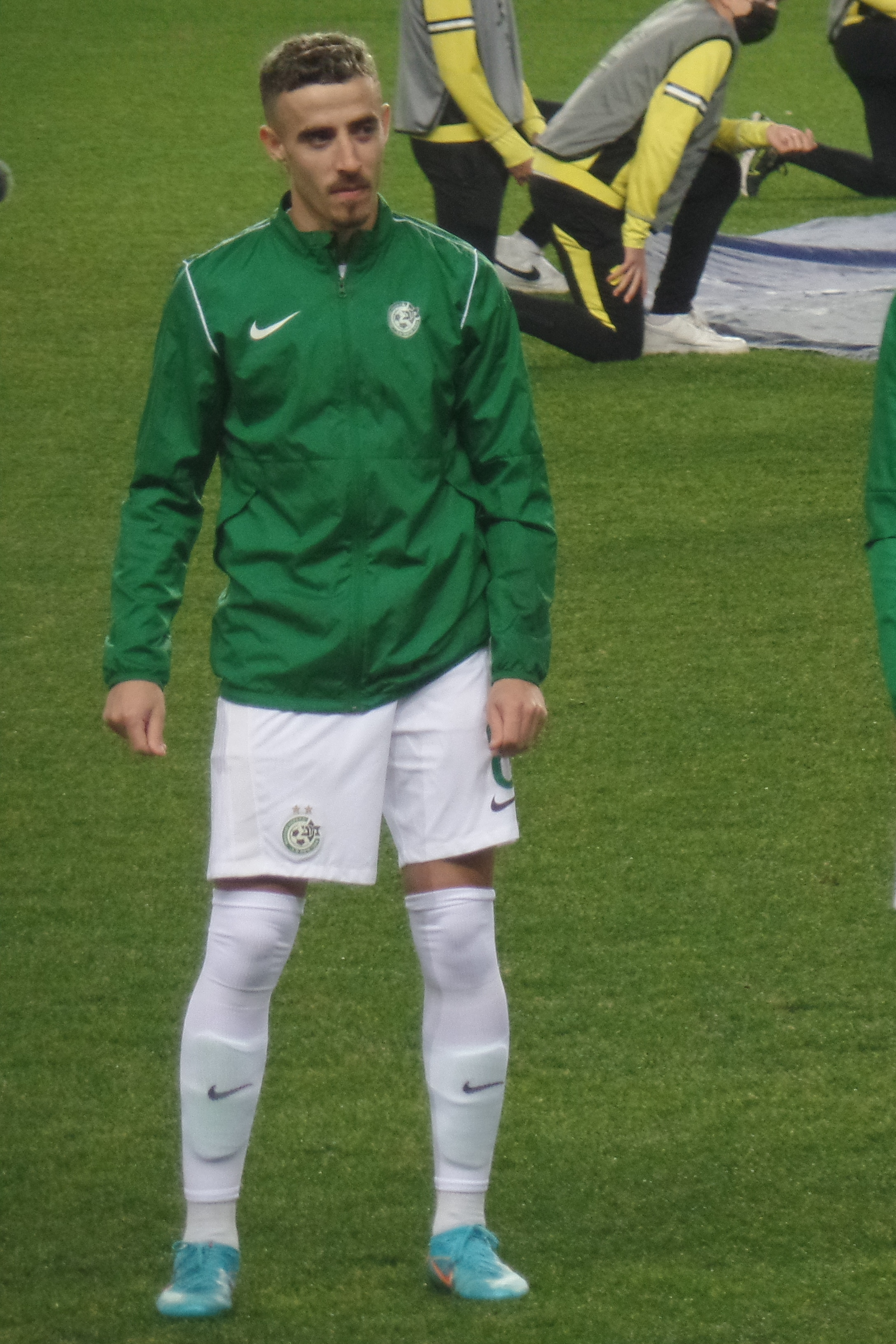
- Haziza with Maccabi Haifa in 2022

Personal information
- Date of birth: 5 July 1995 (age 31)
- Place of birth: Netanya, Israel
- Height: 1.78 m (5 ft 10 in)
- Positions: Attacking midfielder; winger

Team information
- Current team: Maccabi Netanya
- Number: 8

Youth career
- 2004–2007: Hapoel Lod
- 2007–2010: Maccabi Petah Tikva
- 2010–2014: Sektzia Ness Ziona

Senior career*
Years	Team	Apps	(Gls)
2014–2019	Bnei Yehuda	51	(4)
2017–2018	→ Hapoel Ramat Gan (loan)	31	(0)
2019–2026	Maccabi Haifa	184	(33)
2026-	Maccabi Netanya	0	(0)

International career^{‡}
2015	Israel U21	2	(0)
2019–	Israel	18	(0)
- * Club domestic league appearances and goals as of 23 June 2026 ‡ National team caps and goals as of 17 November 2024

Dolev Haziza (Hebrew: דולב חזיזה; born 5 July 1995) is an Israeli professional footballer who plays as an attacking midfielder or as a winger for Israeli Premier League club Maccabi Netanya and the Israel national team.

== Early life ==
Haziza was born in Netanya, Israel, to an Israeli family of both Sephardi Jewish and Mizrahi Jewish descent. He grew up in Lod, Israel. Haziza is observant and does not play football on the Jewish high holiday of Yom Kippur.

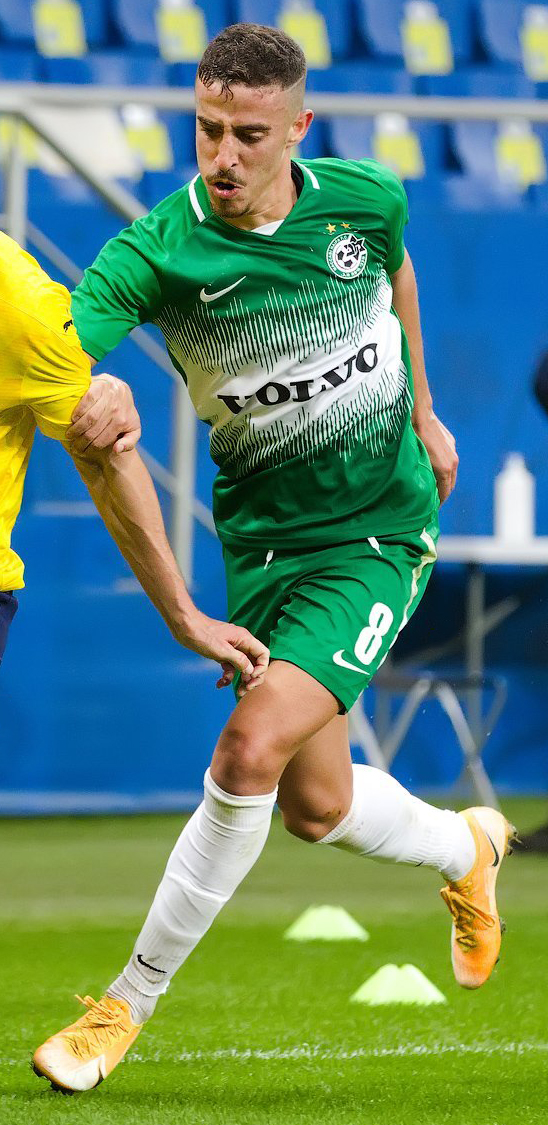
Haziza playing for Maccabi Haifa in 2020

== Club career ==
=== Bnei Yehuda Tel Aviv ===
He made his senior Israeli Premier League debut for Bnei Yehuda Tel Aviv on 22 August 2015, coming on as a second-half substitute, in a 3–0 away victory over Maccabi Haifa.

=== Maccabi Haifa ===
On 20 July 2022, Haziza scored his debut UEFA Champions League qualifiers goal for Israeli side Maccabi Haifa, when he scored in the last minutes of a home match against Greek side Olympiacos that ended in a 1–1 home draw. On 27 July 2022, he assisted the second goal in the return fixture against Olympiacos, helping his team to a 4–0 away victory. On 3 August 2022, he also assisted the fourth goal for Maccabi Haifa in a 4–0 home win against Cypriot side Apollon, during their first leg in the Champions League Third qualifying round.

On 17 August 2022, Haziza assisted all three goals of their 2022–23 UEFA Champions League Play-offs first leg against Serbian side Red Star Belgrade, steering his team to a 3–2 home win. After opening for his Israeli side in the Play-offs second leg against Serbian side Red Star Belgrade during the return fixture that ended in a 2–2 away draw (5–4 in aggregation), Maccabi Haifa received the qualifying ticket to the Champions League Group Stage. Haziza has been officially ranked by UEFA as the most assisting player (5 assists) of the 2022–23 UEFA Champions League qualifiers and play-offs. On 14 September 2022, Haziza assisted his sixth goal in the 2022–23 UEFA Champions League, this time during his team Group stage match against French side Paris Saint-Germain, that ended in a 3–1 home loss for Maccabi Haifa.

== International career ==
He has been a youth international for the Israel U-21 in 2015.

Haziza made his senior international debut on 17 November 2019, during Israel's UEFA Euro 2020 qualifiers, coming on as a 42nd-minute substitute against Poland, in a home match that ended in a 1–2 defeat.

== Honours ==
Bnei Yehuda Tel Aviv

- Israeli Liga Leumit: 2014–15
- Israel State Cup: 2016–17, 2018–19

Maccabi Haifa

- Israeli Premier League: 2020–21, 2021–22, 2022–23
- Israel Super Cup: 2021, 2023
- Israel Toto Cup (Ligat Ha'Al): 2021–22

== See also ==
- List of Jewish footballers
- List of Jews in sports
- List of Israelis

Sporting positions
Preceded by Lior Refaelov	Maccabi Haifa F.C. captain 2025–	Succeeded by
