= 2021–22 Israel State Cup =

Tournament details
- Country: Israel
- Dates: Start: 31 August 2021; Final: 24 May 2022

Final positions
- Champions: Hapoel Be'er Sheva
- Runners-up: Maccabi Haifa
- Semifinalists: Hapoel Haifa; Maccabi Tel Aviv

The 2021–22 Israel State Cup (Hebrew: גביע המדינה, Gvia HaMedina) is the 83rd season of Israel's nationwide Association football cup competition and the 67th after the Israeli Declaration of Independence. The competition stated in August 2021.

== Preliminary rounds ==
=== Liga Bet ===
Schedule:

- Schedule:
- Results:

==== Liga Bet North A ====
First round
3 September 2021, 13:00
F.C. Ahva Kafr Manda (a.e.t.)	3
Maccabi Ahva Shaab	2
4 September 2021, 17:30
Ihud Bnei Shefa-'Amr	3
Bnei Judaydah-Makr	2
Ihud Bnei Majd al-Krum	0
Hapoel Ironi Safed	3
4 September 2021, 10:30
F.C. Bnei M.M.B.E.	0
Hapoel Karmiel	2
4 September 2021, 21:00
F.C. Tzeirei Tamra	3
Beitar Nahariya	2
3 September 2021, 16:30
Hapoel Ironi Arraba	0
Ironi Bnei Kabul	2

Second round
14 September 2021, 14:15
F.C. Ahva Kafr Manda	1
Ihud Bnei Shefa-'Amr	0
14 September 2021, 18:00
Hapoel Ironi Safed	1
Hapoel Karmiel	2
14 September 2021, 20:45
Hapoel Deir Hanna	1
Maccabi Ironi Yaffa	3
F.C. Tzeirei Tamra
Ironi Bnei Kabul

Third round
19 September 2021, 14:30
F.C. Ahva Kafr Manda (a.e.t.)	2
Hapoel Karmiel	1
19 September 2021, 15:30
Maccabi Ironi Yaffa	2
Ironi Bnei Kabul	0

Fourth round
27 September 2021, 14:00
F.C. Ahva Kafr Manda(a.e.t.)	1
Maccabi Ironi Yaffa	0

==== Liga Bet North B ====
First round
3 September 2021, 13:00
S.C. Kfar Kama	4
Maccabi Nujeidat Ahmad	2
3 September 2021, 11:30
Hapoel Tirat HaCarmel (p)	1(3)
Hapoel Bnei Musmus	1(1)
4 September 2021, 12:00
Hapoel Daliyat al-Karmel	0
Maccabi Ahi Iksal	3
3 September 2021, 15:00
F.C. Tirat Carmel	5
Maccabi Neve Sha'anan Eldad	1
3 September 2021, 16:30
Ihud Kafr Qara	3
Tzeirei Umm al-Fahm	1
4 September 2021, 16:00
Hapoel Sandala Gilboa	4
Maccabi Isfiya	1
3 September 2021, 15:00
Beitar Haifa	0
F.C. Pardes Hanna Lior Bokar	1
5 September 2021, 16:45
Hapoel Beit She'an Mesilot	0
Ihud Bnei Baqa	1

Second round
14 September 2021, 15:30
S.C. Kfar Kama	2
Hapoel Tirat HaCarmel	0
14 September 2021, 15:30
Maccabi Ahi Iksal	0
F.C. Tirat Carmel	3
14 September 2021, 15:30
Ihud Kafr Qara (p)	2(3)
Hapoel Sandala Gilboa	2(2)
14 September 2021, 15:30
F.C. Pardes Hanna Lior Bokar	1
Ihud Bnei Baqa	2

Third round
20 September 2021, 13:00
S.C. Kfar Kama	1
F.C. Tirat Carmel	6
17 September 2021, 15:30
Ihud Kafr Qara	3
Ihud Bnei Baqa	0

Fourth round
27 September 2021, 14:00
F.C. Tirat Carmel	2
Ihud Kafr Qara	1

==== Liga Bet South A ====
Preliminary round
31 August 2021, 20:45
AS Sporting Club Tel Aviv	0
Hapoel Kafr Qasim Shouaa	3
31 August 2021, 16:00
Ironi Beit Dagan	0
F.C. Bnei Jaffa Ortodoxim	1

First round
2 September 2021, 21:30
Tzeirei Tira	2
Hapoel Kiryat Ono	1
3 September 2021, 12:00
Hapoel Ramat Israel	3
Beitar Petah Tikva	1
3 September 2021, 11:45
Hapoel Kafr Qasim Shouaa	1(14)
Maccabi Amishav Petah Tikva	1(13)
3 September 2021, 15:00
Hapoel Hod HaSharon	4
Hapoel Pardesiya	0
3 September 2021, 10:30
F.C. Bnei Jaffa Ortodoxim	6
F.C. Roei Heshbon Tel Aviv	1
3 September 2021, 11:45
Beitar Ramat Gan	2
Hapoel Qalansawe	4
3 September 2021, 13:00
Hakoah Amidar Ramat Gan	2
Beitar Kfar Saba	1
3 September 2021, 12:00
Hapoel Mahane Yehuda	6
Shimshon Bnei Tayibe	1

Second round
14 September 2021, 15:30
Tzeirei Tira	3
Hapoel Ramat Israel	0
14 September 2021, 18:00
Hapoel Kafr Qasim Shouaa	2
Hapoel Hod HaSharon	0
14 September 2021, 15:30
F.C. Bnei Jaffa Ortodoxim	2(1)
Hapoel Qalansawe (p)	2(3)
13 September 2021, 15:30
Hakoah Amidar Ramat Gan	2
Hapoel Mahane Yehuda	0

Third round
17 September 2021, 15:30
Tzeirei Tira	0(5)
Hapoel Kafr Qasim Shouaa	0(4)
19 September 2021, 15:00
Hapoel Qalansawe	2
Hakoah Amidar Ramat Gan	0

Fourth round
27 September 2021, 14:00
Tzeirei Tira (a.e.t.)	3
Hapoel Qalansawe	2

==== Liga Bet South B ====
First round
3 September 2021, 11:30
Hapoel Merhavim	1
F.C. Arad	3
3 September 2021, 11:45
F.C. Jerusalem	2
Ironi Modi'in	1
3 September 2021, 12:30
Hapoel Segev Shalom (p)	3(3)
Ironi Or Yehuda	3(1)
1 September 2021, 20:00
F.C. Ramla	0
Maccabi Ironi Netivot	4
3 September 2021, 14:30
Tzeirei Rahat	1
Hapoel Yeruham	5
4 September 2021
Maccabi Ironi Sderot	0
Maccabi Kiryat Malakhi	3
2 September 2021, 19:00
Hapoel Lod	2
F.C. Shikun HaMizrah	3

Second round
14 September 2021, 14:00
F.C. Arad	1
F.C. Jerusalem	2
14 September 2021, 21:00
Hapoel Segev Shalom	3
Maccabi Ironi Netivot	1
14 September 2021, 18:00
Maccabi Be'er Sheva	1
Hapoel Yeruham	3
14 September 2021, 15:30
Maccabi Kiryat Malakhi	0
F.C. Shikun HaMizrah	2

Third round
17 September 2021, 12:00
F.C. Jerusalem	2
Hapoel Segev Shalom	1
19 September 2021, 15:30
Hapoel Yeruham	3
F.C. Shikun HaMizrah	1

Fourth round
27 September 2021, 11:30
F.C. Jerusalem	1
Hapoel Yeruham	3

=== Liga Gimel ===
Sources:

- Schedule:
- Results:

==== Liga Gimel Upper Galilee ====
Second round
14 September 2021, 14:30
Hapoel Bnei Bi'ina	8
F.C. Sallama Misgav	2
12 September 2021, 15:30
Maccabi Bnei Abu Snan	6
Hapoel Nahf	1

Third round
19 September 2021, 20:30
Hapoel Bnei Bi'ina	1
Maccabi Bnei Abu Snan	3
17 September 2021, 14:00
Maccabi Sektzia Ma'alot-Tarshiha	1
Hapoel Shlomi	0

Fourth round
29 September 2021, 15:00
Maccabi Bnei Abu Snan	2
Maccabi Sektzia Ma'alot-Tarshiha	0

==== Liga Gimel Lower Galilee ====
Second round
14 September 2021, 15:30
Al-Ahly Tamra	3
Maccabi Ein Mahil	0
14 September 2021, 15:30
Beitar Kafr Kanna	5
S.C. Shefaram	1

Third round
20 September 2021, 15:30
Al-Ahly Tamra	1
Maccabi Basmat Tab'un	2
20 September 2021, 15:00
Beitar Kafr Kanna	4
F.C. Shefa-'Amr	2

Fourth round
28 September 2021, 19:30
Maccabi Basmat Tab'un	8
Beitar Kafr Kanna	2

==== Liga Gimel Jezreel ====
First round
11 September 2021, 14:00
Ahva Reineh	10
Ihud Tzeirei Iksal	0

Second round
14 September 2021, 15:00
Maccabi Ahva Fureidis	2(2)
Hapoel Ein as-Sahala	2(3)
13 September 2021, 15:30
Hapoel Ramot Menashe Megiddo	2
Maccabi Daburiyya	1
10 September 2021, 15:45
Hapoel Tzeirei Nazareth	7
Hapoel Reineh	0
14 September 2021, 12:30
Ahva Reineh	4
Hapoel Yafa	0

Third round
20 September 2021, 14:45
Hapoel Ein as-Sahala	1
Hapoel Ramot Menashe Megiddo	0
20 September 2021, 14:00
Hapoel Tzeirei Nazareth	0
Ahva Reineh	3

Fourth round
28 September 2021, 14:45
Hapoel Ein as-Sahala	0
Ahva Reineh	2

==== Liga Gimel Samaria ====
First round
10 September 2021, 13:00
Maccabi Barkai	2
Beitar Kiryat Ata	1

Second round
14 September 2021, 20:45
Carmel Haifa	6
Maccabi Barkai	2
10 September 2021, 15:30
Hapoel Kiryat Yam	3
Hapoel Kiryat Haim	2
13 September 2021, 20:30
Tzeirei Haifa	4
Hapoel Ihud Bnei Jatt	2
14 September 2021, 14:00
F.C. Or Akiva	1
Maccabi Kiryat Yam	2

Third round
17 September 2021, 11:00
Carmel Haifa	1
Hapoel Kiryat Yam	8
11 September 2021, 14:00
Tzeirei Haifa	5
F.C. Or Akiva	0

Fourth round
27 September 2021, 14:00
Hapoel Kiryat Yam	4
Tzeirei Haifa	0

==== Liga Gimel Sharon ====
First round
10 September 2021, 15:30
Bnei Ra'anana	6
Hapoel Ganey Tikva	1
10 September 2021, 14:00
Beitar Tubruk	0
Beitar Mateh Binyamin	9
11 September 2021, 20:45
Maccabi HaSharon Netanya	2
Bnei Herzliya	12

Second round
13 September 2021, 20:00
Bnei Ra'anana	4
Maccabi Ironi Kfar Yona	2
14 September 2021, 14:00
Beitar Mateh Binyamin	4
Bnei Herzliya	5
14 September 2021, 15:30
Hapoel Oranit	2(4)
Maccabi Giv'at Shmuel (p)	2(5)
14 September 2021, 15:30
Ironi Ariel (a.e.t.)	2
F.C. Netanya	1

Third round
18 September 2021, 20:15
Bnei Ra'anana	1
Bnei Herzliya	6
19 September 2021, 21:30
Maccabi Giv'at Shmuel	0
Ironi Ariel	1

Fourth round
27 September 2021, 14:00
Bnei Herzliya	6
Ironi Ariel	1

==== Liga Gimel Central ====
First round
10 September 2021, 12:00
Hapoel Ramla	0
Maccabi Ramla	4
10 September 2021, 10:30
Beitar Gedera	0
Beitar Gan Yavne	5
10 September 2021, 11:00
Hapoel Nahlat Yehuda	1
Maccabi Rehovot (a.e.t.)	3

Second round
14 September 2021, 15:30
Hapoel Tirat Shalom	0
Beitar Yavne	4
14 September 2021, 15:30
Maccabi Ramla	4
Hapoel Mevaseret Zion	0
14 September 2021, 15:30
Beitar Gan Yavne	1
Ashdod City	6
14 September 2021, 14:00
Maccabi Rehovot	0
Hapoel Bnei Ashdod	3

Third round
17 September 2021, 13:00
Beitar Yavne (p)	1(4)
Maccabi Ramla	1(3)
17 September 2021, 11:00
Ashdod City (p)	1(3)
Hapoel Bnei Ashdod	1(2)

Fourth round
27 September 2021, 12:30
Beitar Yavne	3
Ashdod City	1

==== Liga Gimel Tel Aviv ====
First round
10 September 2021, 11:30
Maccabi Or Yehuda (a.e.t.)	1
Otzma Holon	0
10 September 2021, 11:30
HaMakhtesh Givatayim	4
Beitar Ezra	0
10 September 2021, 11:45
Inter Aliyah Tel Aviv	0
Hapoel Neve Golan	4
10 September 2021, 12:30
Elitzur Jaffa Tel Aviv	2
Hakoah Galei Gil Ramat Gan	0

Second round
14 September 2021, 19:45
Maccabi Or Yehuda	0
Maccabi HaShikma Hen	4
14 September 2021, 21:30
Maccabi Spartak Ramat Gan	0
Bnei Yehud	3
14 September 2021, 15:00
HaMakhtesh Givatayim	3
Hapoel Neve Golan	1
14 September 2021, 15:30
Elitzur Jaffa Tel Aviv	5
Shikun Vatikim Ramat Gan	1

Third round
20 September 2021, 11:00
Maccabi HaShikma Hen	5
Bnei Yehud	2
17 September 2021, 11:00
HaMakhtesh Givatayim	4
Elitzur Jaffa Tel Aviv	2

Fourth round
27 September 2021, 14:30
Maccabi HaShikma Hen	0
HaMakhtesh Givatayim	4

==== Liga Gimel South ====
First round
10 September 2021, 13:15
Beitar Ashdod	4
F.C. Sderot	2
9 September 2021, 20:00
F.C. Be'er Sheva	1
Maccabi Ironi Hura	7

Second round
14 September 2021, 21:00
Beitar Ashdod	7
Hapoel Bnei Kuseife	1
14 September 2021
Maccabi Ironi Hura	3
Maccabi Dimona	0
14 September 2021, 15:300
F.C. Meitar	1
Bnei Yerucham	3
14 September 2021, 21:15
Hapoel Mateh Yehuda	1
Otzma Be'er Sheva	4

Third round
17 September 2021, 12:30
Beitar Ashdod	1
Maccabi Ironi Hura	3
20 September 2021, 12:00
Bnei Yerucham	3
Otzma Be'er Sheva	4

Fourth round
27 September 2021, 14:30
Maccabi Ironi Hura	5
Otzma Be'er Sheva	0

== Liga Alef stage ==
=== Liga Alef — Fifth round ===
Home team	Score	Away team
Monday 30 August 2021
Maccabi Herzliya	0–2	Bnei Eilat
Tuesday 31 August 2021
Hapoel Iksal	0–3	Hapoel Kaukab
Hapoel Herzliya	1–2	Maccabi Tamra
Hapoel Ashkelon	0–0 (3–4 p)	Nordia Jerusalem

=== Liga Alef — Sixth round ===
Home team	Score	Away team
Thursday 2 September 2021
Hapoel Bik'at HaYarden	2–0	Hapoel Kfar Shalem
Friday 3 September 2021
Ironi Kuseife	0–3	Maccabi Ironi Ashdod
Bnei Eilat	1–0	Shimshon Tel Aviv
Hapoel Migdal HaEmek	0–1	Ironi Tiberias
Hapoel Marmorek	3–1	F.C. Dimona
Maccabi Tzur Shalom	4–1	Maccabi Tamra
Hapoel Bnei Lod	4–0	Hapoel Holon
Maccabi Yavne	3–1	Nordia Jerusalem
Shimshon Kafr Qasim	1–3	Maccabi Sha'arayim
Ironi Nesher	1–1 (3–4 p)	F.C. Tira
Hapoel Azor	0–2	Maccabi Kabilio Jaffa
Hapoel Bu'eine	2–0	Hapoel Bnei Zalafa
F.C. Haifa	3–2	Hapoel Kafr Kanna
Hapoel Ironi Baqa al-Gharbiyye	0–1	Hapoel Bnei Ar'ara 'Ara
Saturday 4 September 2021
Hapoel Kafr Kanna	0–1	Tzeirey Taibe
Tuesday 14 September 2021
Hapoel Kaukab	3–1	Hapoel Bnei Fureidis

== Sixth round ==
Home team	Score	Away team
Monday 4 October 2021
Maccabi Tzur Shalom	2–1 (a.e.t.)	Hapoel Kaukab
F.C. Haifa	1–0	Maccabi Ironi Yaffa
Ironi Tiberias	5–1	Ihud Kafr Qara
Bnei Herzliya	1–2	Tzeirei Tira
Maccabi Ironi Hura	2–4	Maccabi Ironi Ashdod
F.C. Tira	3–1	Maccabi Basmat Tab'un
Hapoel Marmorek	3–1 (a.e.t.)	Beitar Yavne
Hapoel Yeruham	1–2	Maccabi Yavne
Maccabi Sha'arayim	4–1	Hapoel Qalansawe
Bnei Eilat	2–0	Hapoel Bnei Lod
Maccabi Kabilio Jaffa	3–2 (a.e.t.)	F.C. Jerusalem
Hapoel Kiryat Yam	0–2	F.C. Tirat Carmel
HaMakhtesh Givatayim	1–2	Hapoel Bik'at HaYarden
Monday 5 October 2021
Ahva Reineh	1–2	Tzeirey Taibe
Hapoel Bnei Ar'ara 'Ara	2–0	Maccabi Bnei Abu Snan
Monday 12 October 2021
F.C. Ahva Kafr Manda	2–1	Hapoel Bu'eine

== Seventh round ==
Home team	Score	Away team
Tuesday 26 October 2021
Maccabi Sha'arayim (3)	1–0	Maccabi Bnei Reineh (2)
F.C. Tirat Carmel (4)	2–4	Maccabi Kabilio Jaffa (3)
F.C. Ahva Kafr Manda (4)	2–1	Maccabi Ironi Ashdod (3)
Hapoel Marmorek (3)	3–1	Hapoel Bik'at HaYarden (3)
F.C. Haifa (3)	0–5	Ironi Tiberias (3)
F.C. Tira (3)	2–1	Tzeirei Tira (4)
Bnei Eilat (3)	0–4	Hapoel Kfar Saba (2)
Tzeirey Taibe (3)	3–1	Maccabi Tzur Shalom (3)
Maccabi Yavne (3)	0–2	F.C. Kafr Qasim (2)
Hapoel Ramat Gan (2)	2–3	Beitar Tel Aviv Bat Yam (2)
Hapoel Acre (2)	1–0	Hapoel Ramat HaSharon (2)
Maccabi Ahi Nazareth (2)	2–0	Hapoel Ra'anana (2)
Sektzia Nes Tziona (2)	1–2	Bnei Yehuda Tel Aviv (2)
Wednesday 27 October 2021
Hapoel Petah Tikva (2)	3–0	Hapoel Bnei Ar'ara 'Ara (3)

== Eighth round ==
Home team	Score	Away team
Thursday 16 December 2021
Hapoel Ashdod (2)	2–0	F.C. Ahva Kafr Manda (4)
Hapoel Haifa (1)	1–1 (4–2 p)	Hapoel Kfar Saba (2)
Hapoel Petah Tikva (2)	0–1	Maccabi Netanya (1)
Friday 17 December 2021
Maccabi Sha'arayim (3)	2–1 (a.e.t.)	Hapoel Rishon LeZion (2)
Ironi Tiberias (3)	0–3	Bnei Sakhnin (1)
Maccabi Kabilio Jaffa (3)	1–0	F.C. Kafr Qasim (2)
Tzeirey Taibe (3)	0–2	Ironi Kiryat Shmona (1)
Maccabi Ahi Nazareth (2)	2–1 (a.e.t.)	Hapoel Acre (2)
F.C. Ashdod (1)	0–1	Hapoel Umm al-Fahm (2)
Saturday 18 December 2021
Maccabi Haifa (1)	2–0	Hapoel Jerusalem (1)
Hapoel Nof HaGalil (1)	0–2	Maccabi Petah Tikva (1)
Hapoel Hadera (1)	6–1	F.C. Tira (3)
Hapoel Tel Aviv (1)	1–3	Bnei Yehuda Tel Aviv (2)
Sunday 19 December 2021
Beitar Tel Aviv Bat Yam (2)	0–3	Hapoel Be'er Sheva (1)
Beitar Jerusalem (1)	2–1 (a.e.t.)	Hapoel Afula (2)
Maccabi Tel Aviv (1)	4–0	Hapoel Marmorek (3)

== Round of 16 ==
Home team	Score	Away team
Tuesday 11 January 2022
Maccabi Ahi Nazareth (2)	2–3 (a.e.t.)	Maccabi Petah Tikva (1)
Hapoel Ashdod (2)	1–1 (2–4 p)	Maccabi Kabilio Jaffa (3)
Bnei Yehuda Tel Aviv (2)	2–0	Maccabi Sha'arayim (3)
Hapoel Umm al-Fahm (2)	0–0 (4–5 p)	Hapoel Haifa (1)
Ironi Kiryat Shmona (1)	2–2 (3–5 p)	Maccabi Tel Aviv (1)
Wednesday 12 January 2022
Maccabi Netanya (1)	1–2 (a.e.t.)	Hapoel Be'er Sheva (1)
Maccabi Haifa (1)	4–0	Beitar Jerusalem (1)
Thursday 13 January 2022
Hapoel Hadera (1)	3–0	Bnei Sakhnin (1)

== Quarter-finals ==
Unlike the other competitions stages, the quarterfinals will be held in a two-legged format. The draw was held on 13 January 2022 at 14:00 local time.

Team 1	Agg.	Team 2	1st leg	2nd leg
Maccabi Petah Tikva (1)	1–2	Hapoel Be'er Sheva (1)	1–0	0–2 (a.e.t.)
Bnei Yehuda Tel Aviv (2)	0–2	Hapoel Haifa (1)	0–1	0–1
Maccabi Tel Aviv (1)	6–0	Maccabi Kabilio Jaffa (3)	2–0	4–0
Hapoel Hadera (1)	0–3	Maccabi Haifa (1)	0–2	0–1

== Semi-finals ==
The draw was held on 6 March 2022 at 15:00 local time.

19 April 2022 Semi-finals	Maccabi Haifa (1)	2–0	Hapoel Haifa (1)	Tel Aviv
20:30	David 43'; Chery 52'	Report	(red card) 32' Turgeman; (yellow card) 63' Ožbolt	Stadium: Bloomfield Stadium; Attendance: 23,381; Referee: Idan Layba

20 April 2022 Semi-finals	Maccabi Tel Aviv (1)	1–3	Hapoel Be'er Sheva (1)	Tel Aviv
20:30	Jovanović 7'; Baltaxa (yellow card) 55'; Glazer (yellow card) 82'	Report	26', (yellow card) 53' Bareiro; 40' Ansah; (yellow card) 45' Abd Elhamed; 65' Hatuel; (yellow card) 86' Safouri	Stadium: Bloomfield Stadium; Attendance: 26,954; Referee: Roi Reinshreiber

== Final ==
The final was played on 24 May 2022 at the Teddy Stadium in Jerusalem. Hapoel Be'er Sheva won after beating Maccabi Haifa 3–1 in penalties, after 2–2 in extra time.

24 May 2022

Maccabi Haifa (1)	2–2 (a.e.t.)	Hapoel Be'er Sheva (1)
Atzili 55' (pen.); Vítor 87' (o.g.)	Report	27' Safouri; 70' Hatuel
Penalties
Haziza (penalty missed); Abu Fani (penalty scored); Donyoh (penalty missed); Tchibota (penalty missed)	1–3	(penalty missed) Asprilla; (penalty scored) Yosefi; (penalty scored) Abu Abaid; (penalty scored) Lopes

Teddy Stadium, Jerusalem
Referee: Daniel Bar Natan
