= 2021–22 Maccabi Haifa F.C. season =

Maccabi Haifa
2021–22 season
- President: Ya'akov Shahar
- Head coach: Barak Bakhar
- Stadium: Sammy Ofer
- Ligat Ha'Al: 1st
- State Cup: Runners-up
- Toto Cup: Winners
- Super Cup: Winners
- Champions League: First qualifying round
- Conference League: Group stage
- Top goalscorer: League: Omer Atzili (20); All: Omer Atzili (27)
- Highest home attendance: 29,258 (vs Maccabi Netanya (21 May 2022)
- Lowest home attendance: 9,483 (vs Hapoel Tel Aviv (22 August 2021)
- Average home league attendance: 22,226
Home colours	Away colours	Third colours

The 2021–22 season was Maccabi Haifa's 64th season in Israeli Premier League, and their 40th consecutive season in the top division of Israeli football.

In this season, the team won its Second championship in a consecutive to achieve three from four title on this season (Israeli Premier League, Toto Cup and the israeli super cup) and Finished Runners-up on the Israeli state cup.

== Club ==
=== Squad information ===
N	Pos.	Nat.	Name	Age	Since	App	Goals	Ends	Transfer fee	Notes
3	DF	(Israel)	Sean Goldberg	31	2022/2023	45	0	2023/2024	Free	Second nationality:Italy
4	MF	(Niger)	Ali Mohamed	31	2021/2022	49	0	2023/2024	1,400,000€	
5	DF	(Serbia)	Bogdan Planić	34	2020/2021	84	4	2022/2023	Free	
6	MF	(Israel)	Neta Lavi (captain)	30	2015/2016	234	10	2022/2023	Youth system	
7	FW	(Israel)	Omer Atzili	33	2020/2021	77	26	2023/2024	Free	Second nationality:Romania
8	FW	(Israel)	Dolev Haziza	33	2019/2020	132	25	2023/2024	310,000€	Second nationality:France
9	FW	(Israel)	Ben Sahar	37	2021/2022	36	3	2022/2023	Free	
10	MF	(Suriname)	Tjaronn Chery (vice captain)	38	2019/2020	138	37	2022/2023	Free	Second nationality:Nederland
11	FW	(Ghana)	Godsway Donyoh	32	2020/2021	75	15	2021/2022	50,000€	
12	DF	(Israel)	Sun Menahem	32	2015/2016	206	11	2023/2024	20,000€	
13	FW	(Republic of the Congo)	Mavis Tchibota	30	2021/2022	16	2	2023/2024	1,000,000€	Second nationality:Israel
14	MF	(Spain)	José Rodríguez	31	2021/2022	83	1	2022/2023	Free	
15	DF	(Israel)	Ofri Arad	28	2018/2019	138	8	2023/2024	Youth system	Second nationality: Germany
16	MF	(Israel)	Mohammad Abu Fani	28	2016/2017	109	11	2025/2026	Youth system	
17	DF	(Israel)	Taleb Tawatha	34	2009/2010	240	7	2022/2023	€100,000	Originally from youth system
21	FW	(Israel)	Dean David	30	2021/2022	56	25	2024/2025	1,100,000€	
23	DF	(Guadeloupe)	Mickaël Alphonse	37	2021/2022	18	0	2021/2022	Free	Second nationality:France
24	DF	(Israel)	Uri Dahan	26	2021/2022	17	0	2024/2025	500,000€+Sweep deal	
25	DF	(Israel)	Raz Meir	30	2017/2018	140	4	2024/2025	Youth system	Originally from youth system
26	MF	(Israel)	Mahmoud Jaber	27	2021/2022	32	3	2023/2024	Youth system	
33	MF	(Israel)	Maor Levi	26	2019/2020	61	4	2022/2023	Youth system	
44	GK	(United States)	Josh Cohen	34	2019/2020	125	0	2022/2023	Free	Second nationality:Israel
52	GK	(Israel)	Itamar Israeli	34	2021/2022	0	0	2022/2023	Free	
55	DF	(Israel)	Rami Gershon	38	2017/2018	98	1	2021/2022	400,000€	
77	GK	(Israel)	Roee Fucs	27	2021/2021	2	0	2022/2034	Youth system	
90	GK	(Israel)	Roi Mishpati	33	2021/2022	9	0	2021/2022	Free	

- Last updated: 28 May 2022
- Source: mhaifafc.com, Israel Football Association, UEFA Players transfer,
- Ordered by squad number.

== Transfers ==
=== In ===
Date	Pos.	Player	Age	Moving from	Type	Fee	Notes	Source
10 June 2021	DF	(Israel) Sean Goldberg	31	(Israel) Hapoel Be'er Sheva	Transfer	Free		
22 June 2021	MF	(Niger) Ali Mohamed	31	(Israel) Beitar Jerusalem	Transfer	1,400,000€		
23 June 2021	DF	(Israel) Ori Dahan	26	(Israel) Hapoel Ironi Kiryat Shmona	Transfer	500,000€+Sweep deal		
24 June 2021	GK	(Israel) Itamar Israeli	27	(Israel) Hapoel Kfar Saba	Transfer	Free		
25 June 2021	DF	(Australia) Ryan Strain	29	(Australia) Adelaide United	Transfer	€300,000		
28 June 2021	FW	(Israel) Dean David	30	(Israel) F.C. Ashdod	Transfer	€1,100,000		
28 June 2021	FW	(Israel) Ben Sahar	37	(Israel) Hapoel Be'er Sheva	Transfer	Free		
30 June 2021	DF	(Israel) Yahav Gurfinkel	28	(Israel) Hapoel Haifa	Loan returns	Free		
30 June 2021	DF	(Nigeria) Ikouwem Utin	26	(Israel) Bnei Sakhnin	Loan returns	Free		
31 August 2021	GK	(Israel) Roi Mishpati	33	(Israel) F.C. Ashdod	Transfer	Free		
2 February 2022	FW	(Republic of the Congo) Mavis Tchibota	30	(Bulgaria) Ludogorets Razgrad	Transfer	€1,000,000		
3 February 2022	DF	(France) Mickaël Alphonse	37	(France) Amiens	Transfer	Free		

=== Out ===
Date	Pos.	Player	Age	Type	Fee	Moving to	Notes	Source
10 June 2021	MF	(Netherlands) Yanic Wildschut	34	End of Contract	Free	(Bulgaria) CSKA Sofia		
15 June 2021	GK	(Israel) Omri Glazer	30	Release	Free	(Israel) Hapoel Be'er Sheva		
25 June 2021	DF	(Cameroon) Ernest Mabouka	38	End of Contract	Free	(Israel) Hapoel Nof HaGalil		
25 June 2021	DF	(Israel) Ayid Habshi	31	Transfer	Deal	(Israel) Hapoel Kiryat Shmona	Part of Uri Dahan transfer deal.	
30 June 2021	DF	(The Gambia) Sonko Kabba	24	Loan Out	Free	(Israel) Hapoel Ramat HaSharon		
7 July 2021	MF	(Israel) Ihab Abu Alshikh	26	Loan Out	Free	(Israel) Maccabi Netanya		
12 July 2021	FW	(Australia) Nikita Rukavytsya	39	End of Contract	Free	(Israel) Hapoel Be'er Sheva		
12 July 2021	FW	(Israel) Stav Nahmani	24	Loan Out	Free	(Israel) Hapoel Nof HaGalil		
15 July 2021	DF	(Israel) Yahav Gurfinkel	28	Transfer	€400,000	(Sweden) Norrköping		
26 July 2021	DF	(Israel) Rony Laufer	25	Loan Out	Free	(Israel) Hapoel Afula		
15 August 2021	MF	(Israel) Nehorai Ifrach	23	Loan Out	Free	(Israel) Hapoel Afula		
31 August 2021	DF	(Nigeria) Ikouwem Utin	26	Transfer	€150,000	(Croatia) Slaven Belupo		
9 September 2021	MF	(Israel) Timothy Muzie	25	Loan Out	Free	(Israel) Hapoel Nof HaGalil		
9 September 2021	FW	(Israel) Mohammed Awaed	29	Loan Out	Free	(Israel) Maccabi Petah Tikva		
12 January 2022	MF	(Israel) Yuval Ashkenazi	34	End of Contract	Free	(Israel) Maccabi Netanya		
17 January 2022	DF	(Israel) Roey Elimelech	24	Loan Out	Free	(Israel) Hapoel Afula		
3 February 2022	DF	(Israel) Adar Azruel	24	Loan Out	Free	(Israel) Hapoel Ra'anana		
3 February 2022	DF	(Australia) Ryan Strain	29	Release	Free	Free agent		

== Pre-season and friendlies ==
Win Draw Loss

29 June 2021	Maccabi Haifa (Israel)	2–3	(Belgium) OH Leuven
18:30 IST	Sahar 61'; Nehorai Ifrach 87'	Report	18'; 68'; 85'

2 July 2021	Maccabi Haifa (Israel)	6–1	(Belgium) R. Charleroi
15:30 IST	Chery 21'; Atzili 54', 82'; David 72' (pen.); Goldberg 74'; Ashkenazi 72'	Report	Gershon 52' (o.g.)

== Competitions ==
=== Overview ===
Competition	First match	Last match	Starting round	Final position	Record							
Competition	First match	Last match	Starting round	Final position	Pld	W	D	L	GF	GA	GD	Win %
Ligat Ha'Al	29 August 2021	21 May 2022	Matchday 1	Winners	36	24	6	6	79	27	+52	66.67
State Cup	18 December 2021	24 May 2022	Round of 32	Runners-up	6	5	0	1	13	2	+11	83.33
Toto Cup	22 August 2021	22 September 2021	European qualification route	Winners	2	2	0	0	3	1	+2	100.00
Super Cup	25 July 2021	25 July 2021	Final	Winners	1	1	0	0	2	0	+2	100.00
UEFA Champions League	7 July 2021	14 July 2021	First qualifying round	First qualifying round	2	0	1	1	1	3	−2	0.00
UEFA Europa Conference League	22 July 2021	9 December 2021	Second qualifying round	Group stage	12	5	2	5	23	15	+8	41.67
Total					59	37	9	13	121	48	+73	62.71

Last updated: 27 May 2022
Source: Competitions

including 3-0 Walkover win against Bnei Sakhnin in round 35

== Ligat Ha'Al ==
=== Regular season ===
==== Regular season table ====
Pos	Team	Pld	W	D	L	GF	GA	GD	Pts	Qualification or relegation
1	Maccabi Haifa	26	18	5	3	62	19	+43	59	Qualification for the Championship round
2	Hapoel Be'er Sheva	26	16	7	3	39	17	+22	55	Qualification for the Championship round
3	Maccabi Tel Aviv	26	16	5	5	48	31	+17	53	Qualification for the Championship round
4	Bnei Sakhnin	26	12	6	8	28	29	−1	42	Qualification for the Championship round
5	Maccabi Netanya	26	10	10	6	34	27	+7	40	Qualification for the Championship round

Source: Soccerway
Rules for classification: 1) Points; 2) Goal difference; 3) Matches won; 4) Goals scored; 5) Head-to-head points; 6) Head-to-head goal difference; 7) Head-to-head goals scored; 8) Play-off.

==== Matches ====
Win Draw Loss

29 August 2021 1	Hapoel Hadera	0–0	Maccabi Haifa	Netanya
20:30	Gozlan (yellow card) 67'; Levkovich (yellow card) 86'; Tamir Glazer (yellow card) 90+5'	Report	(yellow card) 87' Gershon; (yellow card) 90' Planić	Stadium: Netanya Stadium; Attendance: 6,700; Referee: Eitan Shmuelevitz

11 September 2021 2	Maccabi Haifa	2–1	Bnei Sakhnin	Haifa
20:30	Goldberg (yellow card) 60'; Haziza (yellow card) 69'; Atzili 70' (pen.), 90+1'	Report	(yellow card) 17' Ćirković; (yellow card) 58' Kayal (yellow card) 58'; (yellow card) 68' Kabha	Stadium: Sammy Ofer Stadium; Attendance: 22,213; Referee: Daniel Bar Natan

18 September 2021 3	Maccabi Tel Aviv	2–1	Maccabi Haifa	Tel Aviv
20:30	Nachmias 3'; Glazer (yellow card) 25'; Perica 60'; Biton (yellow card) 63'	Report	32' Menahem; (yellow card) 63' Rodríguez	Stadium: Bloomfield Stadium; Attendance: 25,705; Referee: Roi Reinshreiber

26 September 2021 4	Maccabi Haifa	2–0	Maccabi Petah Tikva	Haifa
20:15	Daniel Plesher 20' (o.g.); Atzili 69'	Report	(yellow card) 36' Daniel Plesher; (yellow card) 41' Cohen	Stadium: Sammy Ofer Stadium; Attendance: 21,230; Referee: Snir Levi

3 October 2021 5	Maccabi Haifa	1–2	Hapoel Be'er Sheva	Haifa
20:45	Haziza 13' (pen.), (yellow card) 90+5'; Mohamed (yellow card) 74'; Planić (yellow card) 74'; Menahem (yellow card) 79'; Atzili (red card) 84'; Arad (red card) 90+4'	Report	(yellow card) 9' Safouri; (red card) 19' Gordana; (yellow card) 74' Shechter; (yellow card) 74' Dadia; 86' (pen.), 90+6' (pen.), (yellow card) 90+7' Abu Abaid; (yellow card) 90+3' Lopes	Stadium: Sammy Ofer Stadium; Attendance: 26,102; Referee: Gal Leibovich

16 October 2021 6	Hapoel Jerusalem	1–4	Maccabi Haifa	Jerusalem
18:00	Hadida 27'; Noam Malmoud (yellow card) 50'	Report	9' Haziza; 42', 86' Mahmoud Jaber; 68' Donyoh; (yellow card) 89' Mohamed	Stadium: Teddy Stadium; Attendance: 6,173; Referee: Nael Odeh

25 October 2021 7	Maccabi Haifa	2–0	Maccabi Netanya	Haifa
20:45	Haziza 9'; Menahem (yellow card) 25'; Planić (yellow card) 33'; Atzili 40'; Strain (yellow card) 52'	Report	(yellow card) 28' Šehović; (yellow card) 30' Tzedek; (yellow card) 61' Doumbia; (yellow card) 72' Zlatanović	Stadium: Sammy Ofer Stadium; Attendance: 22,572; Referee: Roi Reinshreiber

30 October 2021 8	F.C. Ashdod	2–2	Maccabi Haifa	Ashdod
20:30	Jaber (yellow card) 24'; Saief 27'; Inbrum 69' (pen.); Gerafi (yellow card) 89'; Ben Zaken (yellow card) 90+5'; Bayo (red card) 90+5'	Report	6' (o.g.) Cohen; 63' Chery; (yellow card) 55' Meir; (yellow card) 65' Haziza; (yellow card) 67' Menahem; (yellow card) 68' Donyoh	Stadium: Yud-Alef Stadium; Attendance: 5,140; Referee: Igal Frid

7 November 2021 9	Maccabi Haifa	4–0	Ironi Kiryat Shmona	Haifa
20:15	David 16'; Abu Fani 42'; Chery 64'; Atzili 90+1'	Report	(yellow card) 4' Alaa Jafar; (yellow card) 4' Habshi; (yellow card) 32' Ziv Morgan; (yellow card) 77' Guy Ben Lulu	Stadium: Sammy Ofer Stadium; Attendance: 19,326; Referee: Liran Liany

28 November 2021 10	Hapoel Tel Aviv	1–3	Maccabi Haifa	Tel Aviv
20:45	Einbinder 35' (pen.); Xulu (yellow card) 41'; Šetkus (yellow card) 90'	Report	(yellow card) 28' Haziza; 45', 90+1' (pen.) Atzili; 47', (yellow card) 79' David; (yellow card) 68' Mohamed; (yellow card) 74' Goldberg; (yellow card) 79' Levi	Stadium: Bloomfield Stadium; Attendance: 13,922; Referee: Orel Grinfeld

2 December 2021 11	Maccabi Haifa	5–1	Hapoel Haifa	Haifa
20:30	David 16', 45'; Haziza 18', (yellow card) 45'; Mohamed (yellow card) 42'; Menahem (yellow card) 55'; Atzili 72'; Donyoh 90'	Report	(yellow card) 32' Serdal; 57' Ožbolt	Stadium: Sammy Ofer Stadium; Attendance: 29,127; Referee: Roi Reinshreiber

5 December 2021 12	Hapoel Nof HaGalil	0–4	Maccabi Haifa	Nof HaGalil
20:15	Frater (yellow card) 72'	Report	38' Atzili; 60' David; 76' Abu Fani; 89' Haziza	Stadium: Green Stadium; Attendance: 3,615; Referee: Shalom Ben Avraham

13 December 2021 13	Maccabi Haifa	2–1	Beitar Jerusalem	Haifa
20:45	David 27', 32'; Rodríguez (yellow card) 29'; Planić (yellow card) 35'; Abu Fani (yellow card) 67'; Levi (yellow card) 90'	Report	(yellow card) 35' Rotman; (yellow card) 41' Kriaf; 73' Shua	Stadium: Sammy Ofer Stadium; Attendance: 29,135; Referee: Erez Papir

21 December 2021 14	Maccabi Haifa	1–0	Hapoel Hadera	Haifa
20:30	David 34'; Meir (yellow card) 41'; Abu Fani (yellow card) 45'	Report	(yellow card) 51' Tamir Glazer; (yellow card) 80' Dia Lababidi	Stadium: Sammy Ofer Stadium; Attendance: 16,126; Referee: David Foxman

25 December 2021 15	Bnei Sakhnin	0–6	Maccabi Haifa	Netanya (Note: the game was hosted away from home stadium as punishment for their fans' unruliness)
19:50	Mufleh Shala'ata (yellow card) 19'; Ihab Ghanayem (yellow card) 25'; Kabha (red card) 40'	Report	12' Arad; 14' Haziza; 45', 68' Atzili; 50' Chery; 83' Levi	Stadium: Netanya Stadium; Attendance: 11,100; Referee: Shalom Ben Avraham

3 January 2022 16	Maccabi Haifa	3–2	Maccabi Tel Aviv	Haifa
20:30	Mohamed (yellow card) 34'; Haziza (yellow card) 54'; David (yellow card) 48', (goal) 87'; Meir (yellow card) 66'; Chery 77'; Donyoh 79'	Report	1' (o.g.) Haziza; (yellow card) 4', (goal) 14' Shamir; (yellow card) 12' Saborit; (yellow card) 20' Almog; (yellow card) 31' Baltaxa; (yellow card) 65' Peretz; (yellow card) 73' Glazer	Stadium: Sammy Ofer Stadium; Attendance: 29,123; Referee: Liran Liany

8 January 2022 17	Maccabi Petah Tikva	0–4	Maccabi Haifa	Petah Tikva
17:45	Diniz (yellow card) 6'; Cohen (red card) 20'; Eitan Azulay (yellow card) 34'; Blorian (yellow card) 86'	Report	14' Haziza; 26' David; 78' Levi; 90+1' Sahar	Stadium: HaMoshava Stadium; Attendance: 10,285; Referee: Gal Leibovitz

17 January 2022 18	Hapoel Be'er Sheva	1–2	Maccabi Haifa	Be'er Sheva
20:30	Shechter (yellow card) 31'; Bareiro 34', (yellow card) 43'; Yosefi (yellow card) 65'; Vítor (yellow card) 69'; Glazer (yellow card) 79'	Report	7', (yellow card) 52' Atzili; 28' (o.g.) Vítor; (red card) 45' Meir; (yellow card) 90+5' Cohen; (yellow card) 90+6' Haziza	Stadium: Turner Stadium; Attendance: 14,640; Referee: Roi Reinshreiber

22 January 2022 19	Maccabi Haifa	1–1	Hapoel Jerusalem	Haifa
19:50	Abu Fani (yellow card) 16' (yellow-red card) 51'; Atzili (yellow card) 35'; Donyoh 87'	Report	(yellow card) 60' Awaka Ashta; (yellow card) 62', (goal) 87' Agada; (red card) 82' Omer Agbadish	Stadium: Sammy Ofer Stadium; Attendance: 21,894; Referee: Niv Shataif

30 January 2022 20	Maccabi Netanya	1–1	Maccabi Haifa	Netanya
20:30	Zlatanović (yellow card) 22'; Ashkenazi 51' (pen.); Šehović (yellow card) 73'	Report	(yellow card) 36' Arad; (yellow card) 50' Mohamed; (yellow card) 65' Menahem; (yellow card) 73' Haziza; (yellow card) 80' Gershon; 84' Atzili; (yellow card) 90+7' Meir	Stadium: Netanya Stadium; Attendance: 12,297; Referee: Eitan Shmuelevitz

7 February 2022 21	Maccabi Haifa	6–0	F.C. Ashdod	Haifa
20:30	Atzili 7', 19', 32', 45'; David 69', 74'	Report	(red card) 6' Awany; (yellow card) 53' Cvetković	Stadium: Sammy Ofer Stadium; Attendance: 25,732; Referee: Snir Lavi

14 February 2022 22	Hapoel Ironi Kiryat Shmona	1–2	Maccabi Haifa	Kiryat Shmona
20:15	Shviro 17'; Guy Mizrahi (yellow card) 37'; Szöke (yellow card) 55'; Planić 58' (o.g.); Alaa Jafar (yellow card) 90'; Yadin Lugasi (yellow card) 90+3'	Report	32' Atzili; (yellow card) 40' David; (yellow card) 90' Abu Fani	Stadium: Municipal Stadium; Referee: Idan Leiba

21 February 2022 23	Maccabi Haifa	2–0	Hapoel Tel Aviv	Haifa
20:30	David 61'; Chery 69'	Report	(yellow card) 75' Vered; (yellow card) 77' Osher Davida; (yellow card) 83' Leidner	Stadium: Sammy Ofer Stadium; Attendance: 29,114; Referee: Eitan Shmuelevitz

26 February 2022 24	Hapoel Haifa	0–1	Maccabi Haifa	Haifa
20:00	Malul (yellow card) 1'; Touray (yellow card) 31'; Zamir (yellow card) 83'; Maman (yellow card) 86'	Report	17' Chery	Stadium: Sammy Ofer Stadium; Attendance: 26,285; Referee: Orel Grinfeld

5 March 2022 25	Maccabi Haifa	1–1	Hapoel Nof HaGalil	Haifa
15:00	Planić (yellow card) 13'; Alphonse (yellow card) 16'; David 45+3'; Mohamed (yellow card) 74'	Report	Tweh (yellow card) 29'; Eli Balilty (yellow card) 47' (yellow-red card) 67'; Khlaikhal 84'; Marinovic (yellow card) 90+6'	Stadium: Sammy Ofer Stadium; Attendance: 29,115; Referee: David Fuxman

14 March 2022 26	Beitar Jerusalem	0–1	Maccabi Haifa	Jerusalem
20:30	Kriaf (yellow card) 5'; Rotman (yellow card) 24'; Zrihan (yellow card) 58'; Tamir Adi (yellow card) 78'; Shua (yellow card) 90+2'	Report	42' Tchibota; (yellow card) 71' Goldberg	Stadium: Teddy Stadium; Attendance: 15,280; Referee: Orel Grinfeld

==== Results overview ====
Win Draw Loss

Opposition	Home score	Away score
Beitar Jerusalem	2–1	1–0
Bnei Sakhnin	2–1	6–0
F.C. Ashdod	6–0	2–2
Hapoel Be'er Sheva	1–2	2–1
Hapoel Hadera	1–0	0–0
Hapoel Haifa	5–1	1–0
Hapoel Jerusalem	1–1	4–1
Hapoel Nof HaGalil	1–1	4–0
Hapoel Tel Aviv	2–0	3–1
Ironi Kiryat Shmona	4–0	1–2
Maccabi Netanya	2–0	1–1
Maccabi Petah Tikva	2–0	4–0
Maccabi Tel Aviv	3–2	1–2

=== Championship round ===
==== Championship round table ====
Pos	Team	Pld	W	D	L	GF	GA	GD	Pts	Qualification	MHA	HBS	MTA	MNE	HTA	BnS
1	Maccabi Haifa (C)	36	24	6	6	79	27	+52	78	Qualification for the Champions League second qualifying round	—	2–0	1–3	4–0	3–0	1–0
2	Hapoel Be'er Sheva	36	20	10	6	53	30	+23	70	Qualification for the Europa Conference League second qualifying round	1–0	—	1–0	4–1	2–2	3–1
3	Maccabi Tel Aviv	36	20	9	7	63	38	+25	69	Qualification for the Europa Conference League second qualifying round	1–1	1–1	—	2–1	5–0	0–0
4	Maccabi Netanya	36	13	13	10	47	41	+6	52	Qualification for the Europa Conference League second qualifying round	3–0	3–0	1–1	—	0–0	3–0
5	Hapoel Tel Aviv	36	13	11	12	44	47	−3	50		0–2	2–1	0–2	2–0	—	2–1
6	Bnei Sakhnin	36	13	10	13	33	43	−10	49		0–3	1–1	1–0	1–1	0–0	—

Source: Soccerway
Legend: Blue = home team win; Yellow = draw; Red = away team win.
Rules for classification: 1) Points; 2) Goal difference; 3) Matches won; 4) Goals scored; 5) Head-to-head points; 6) Head-to-head goal difference; 7) Head-to-head goals scored; 8) Play-off.
(C) Champions

==== Matches ====
19 March 2022 27	Maccabi Haifa	3–0	Hapoel Tel Aviv	Haifa
20:00	David 13'; Haziza 34'; M. Jaber 89'; Arad (yellow card) 90'	Report	(yellow card) 35' Bitton	Stadium: Sammy Ofer Stadium; Attendance: 27,532; Referee: Idan Leiba

4 April 2022 28	Maccabi Haifa	2–0	Hapoel Be'er Sheva	Haifa
20:30	David (yellow card) 25'; Haziza (yellow card) 29'; Abu Fani 62'; Rodríguez (yellow card) 65'; Menahem 80'	Report	(yellow card) 3' Gordana; (yellow card) 37' Lopes; (yellow card) 45' (yellow-red card) 45' Asprilla; (yellow card) 61' Ansah	Stadium: Sammy Ofer Stadium; Attendance: 28,457; Referee: Orel Grinfeld

11 April 2022 29	Maccabi Tel Aviv	1–1	Maccabi Haifa	Tel Aviv
20:30	Oscar Gloch 27'; Sá (yellow card) 90'	Report	(yellow card) 19' Atzili; (yellow card) 53' Planić; (yellow card) 71' Haziza; (yellow card) 85' Goldberg; 90+3' Chery	Stadium: Bloomfield Stadium; Attendance: 25,132; Referee: Daniel Bar Natan

16 April 2022 30	Maccabi Haifa	1–0	Bnei Sakhnin	Haifa
20:00	Mohamed (yellow card) 6'; Chery (yellow card) 66', (goal) 66'; Abu Fani (yellow card) 78'; Levi (yellow card) 93'	Report	(yellow card) 23' Kayal; (yellow card) 45' Kabha; (yellow card) 55' Gad Amos; (yellow card) 71' Raz Stain; (yellow card) 87' Sporkslede	Stadium: Sammy Ofer Stadium; Attendance: 27,253; Referee: Snir Levi

23 April 2022 31	Maccabi Netanya	3–0	Maccabi Haifa	Netanya
17:30	Twumasi 22'; Zlatanović 45', 61'; Enow (yellow card) 77'; Avraham (yellow card) 90+2'	Report	(yellow card) 70' Abu Fani; (yellow card) 74' Chery; (yellow card) 88' Goldberg; (yellow card) 90+2' Planić	Stadium: Netanya Stadium; Attendance: 12,198; Referee: Gal Leibovitz

2 May 2022 32	Hapoel Tel Aviv	0–2	Maccabi Haifa	Tel Aviv
20:30	Shay Ayzen (yellow card) 21'; Azulay (yellow card) 29'; Vered (yellow card) 60'; Davida (yellow card) 76'; Gotlieb (yellow card) 80'	Report	26' Atzili; (yellow card) 52' Lavi; (yellow card) 76' Donyoh; 84' Haziza	Stadium: Bloomfield Stadium; Attendance: 18,300; Referee: Roi Reinshreiber

7 May 2022 33	Hapoel Be'er Sheva	1–0	Maccabi Haifa	Be'er Sheva
20:30	Bareiro (yellow card) 19'; Tibi 80'; Keltjens (yellow card) 82'; Glazer (yellow card) 90'		(yellow card) 20' Alphonse; (yellow card) 31' (yellow-red card) 50' Abu Fani; (yellow card) 61' David; (yellow card) 62' Haziza; (yellow card) 77' Gershon; (yellow card) 80' Planić	Stadium: Turner Stadium; Attendance: 12,945; Referee: David Foxman

10 May 2022 34	Maccabi Haifa	1–3	Maccabi Tel Aviv	Haifa
20:30	Lavi (yellow card) 16'; Chery 63'; Alphonse (yellow card) 85'; Roi Mishpati (yellow card) 86'	Report	23' Perica; (yellow card) 45' Nachmias; (yellow card) 60' Kuwas; (yellow card) 67' Shamir; 86' (pen.) Jovanović; 90+2' Oscar Gloch	Stadium: Sammy Ofer Stadium; Attendance: 21,141; Referee: Idan Leiba

35	Bnei Sakhnin	0–3	Maccabi Haifa	Petah Tikva
				Stadium: HaMoshava Stadium
Note: w/o

21 May 2022 36	Maccabi Haifa	4–0	Maccabi Netanya	Haifa
20:30	Mavis Tchibota 21' (pen.); Donyoh 34'; Mahmoud Jaber (yellow card) 62'; Atzili 66'; Levi 80'	Report	(yellow card) 2' Shlomo	Stadium: Sammy Ofer Stadium; Attendance: 29,258; Referee: cGal Leibovitz

==== Results overview ====
Win Draw Loss

Opposition	Home score	Away score
Bnei Sakhnin	1–0	0–3 w/o
Hapoel Be'er Sheva	2–0	0–1
Hapoel Tel Aviv	3–0	2–0
Maccabi Netanya	4–0	0–3
Maccabi Tel Aviv	1–3	1–1

=== Overall ===
==== Results summary ====
Overall								Home						Away					
Pld	W	D	L	GF	GA	GD	Pts	W	D	L	GF	GA	GD	W	D	L	GF	GA	GD
36	24	6	6	79	27	+52	78	14	2	2	43	12	+31	10	4	4	36	15	+21

Last updated: 22 May 2022.
Source: Competitive matches

(Note: including 3 goals from matchday 35 after won 3-0 w/o)

==== Results by round ====
Round	1	2	3	4	5	6	7	8	9	10	11	12	13	14	15	16	17	18	19	20	21	22	23	24	25	26	27	28	29	30	31	32	33	34	35	36
Ground	A	H	A	H	H	A	H	A	H	A	H	A	H	H	A	H	A	A	H	A	H	A	H	A	H	A	H	H	A	H	A	A	A	H	A	H
Result	D	W	L	W	L	W	W	D	W	W	W	W	W	W	W	W	W	W	D	D	W	L	W	W	D	W	W	W	D	W	L	W	L	L	W	W
Position	8	5	7	4	6	5	3	3	2	2	2	2	2	2	2	2	1	1	1	1	1	1	1	1	1	1	1	1	1	1	1	1	1	1	1	1

Updated to match(es) played on 11 May 2022. Source: Competitive Matches
A = Away; H = Home; W = Win; D = Draw; L = Loss

== State Cup ==
18 December 2021 Round of 32	Maccabi Haifa	2–0	Hapoel Jerusalem (1)	Haifa
15:00	Arad 45+2'; Abu Fani (yellow card) 72'; Planić (yellow card) 77'; David 90+5'	Report	(yellow card) 28' Badash; (yellow card) 45' Awaka Ashta; (yellow card) 92' Omer Agbadish	Stadium: Sammy Ofer Stadium; Attendance: 16,853; Referee: Idan Leiba

12 January 2022 Round of 16	Maccabi Haifa	4–0	Beitar Jerusalem (1)	Haifa
20:00	Kriaf 11' (o.g.); Abu Fani 22' (pen.); Atzili 26'; Gershon (yellow card) 47'; Levi (yellow card) 56'; Rodríguez (yellow card) 61'; Chery 68'	Report	(yellow card) 20' (yellow-red card) 34' Liel Deri	Stadium: Sammy Ofer Stadium; Attendance: 23,743; Referee: Igal Frid

2 February 2022 Quarter-finals — First leg	Hapoel Hadera (1)	0–2	Maccabi Haifa	Netanya
20:30	Usmman (yellow card) 61'; Dia Lababidi (yellow card) 71'	Report	19' David; (yellow card) 37' Arad; 45' Lavi; (yellow card) 55' Abu Fani; (yellow card) 78' Menahem	Stadium: Netanya Stadium

1 March 2022 Quarter-finals — Second leg	Maccabi Haifa	1–0 (3–0 agg.)	Hapoel Hadera (1)	Haifa
20:00	Rodríguez (yellow card) 32'; David 58'	Report	(yellow card) 27' Ron Unger; (yellow card) 31' Tamir Glazer; (yellow card) 54' Afik Katan	Stadium: Sammy Ofer Stadium; Attendance: 11,746; Referee: Aviad Shiloach

19 April 2022 Semi-finals	Maccabi Haifa	2–0	Hapoel Haifa (1)	Tel Aviv
20:30	David 43'; Chery 52'	Report	(red card) 32' Turgeman; (yellow card) 63' Ožbolt	Stadium: Bloomfield Stadium; Attendance: 23,381; Referee: Idan Leiba

24 May 2022 Final	Maccabi Haifa	2–2 (a.e.t.) (1–3 p)	Hapoel Be'er Sheva	Jerusalem
	Atzili 55' (pen.); Vítor 87' (o.g.)	Report	27' Safouri; 70' Hatuel	Stadium: Teddy Stadium
	Penalties
	Haziza (penalty missed); Abu Fani (penalty scored); Donyoh (penalty missed); Tchibota (penalty missed)		(penalty missed) Asprilla; (penalty scored) Yosefi; (penalty scored) Abu Abaid; (penalty scored) Lopes

== Toto Cup ==
=== Semi-final ===
22 August 2021 Semi final	Maccabi Haifa	2–0	Hapoel Tel Aviv	Haifa
20:45	Mohamed (yellow card) 18'; Mahmoud Jaber (yellow card) 36'; Gershon (yellow card) 83'; Abu Fani 88'; David 90+2'	Report	(yellow card) 19' Einbinder; (yellow card) 59' Bitton	Stadium: Sammy Ofer Stadium; Attendance: 9,483; Referee: Gal Leibovich

=== Final ===
22 September 2021 Final	Maccabi Haifa	1–1 (7–6 p)	Hapoel Be'er Sheva	Netanya
20:15	Levi (yellow card) 5'; Atzili (yellow card) 61'; Planić (yellow card) 74'; David 85'	Report	(yellow card) 35' Abd Elhamed; 45' Bareiro; (yellow card) 55' Glazer; (yellow card) 55' Abu Abaid	Stadium: Netanya Stadium; Attendance: 14,000; Referee: Igal Frid
	Penalties
	Chery (penalty scored); Haziza (penalty scored); Atzili (penalty missed); David (penalty scored); Dahan (penalty scored) Mahmoud Jaber (penalty scored) Goldberg (penalty scored) Meir (penalty scored)		(penalty scored) Gordana; (penalty scored) Lopes; (penalty missed) Bareiro (penalty scored) Ansah; (penalty scored) Rukavytsya; (penalty scored) Dadia; (penalty scored) Vítor; (penalty missed) Micha

== Israel Super Cup ==
25 July 2021	Maccabi Haifa	2–0	Maccabi Tel Aviv	Haifa
20:30	Atzili (yellow card) 1'; Sahar 50'; Meir (yellow card) 68'; Cohen (yellow card) 70'; Abu Fani 72', (yellow card) 90+2'; Levi (yellow card) 90+1'	Report	(yellow card) 14' Glazer; (yellow card) 37' Nachmias	Stadium: Sammy Ofer Stadium; Attendance: 19,798; Referee: Liran Liany

== UEFA Champions League ==
=== First qualifying round ===
7 July 2021 1st qualifying round – 1st leg	Maccabi Haifa (Israel)	1–1	(Kazakhstan) FC Kairat	Haifa
20:00 (IDT)	Donyoh (yellow card) 22'; Abu Fani (yellow card) 38'; Atzili 45'	Report	76' Alip; (yellow card) 86' Usenov; (yellow card) 90' Mikanović	Stadium: Sammy Ofer Stadium; Attendance: 25,138; Referee: Milovan Milačić (Montenegro); Assistant referees: Aleksandar Djikanović (Montenegro); Dragan Vujović (Montenegro); Fourth official: Miloš Savović (Montenegro)

14 July 2021 1st qualifying round – 2nd leg	FC Kairat (Kazakhstan)	2–0	(Israel) Maccabi Haifa	Almaty
17:00 (IDT)	Love 10'; Hovhannisyan (yellow card) 38'; Suyumbayev (yellow card) 61'; Abiken 66', (yellow card) 73'; Sergey Keiler (red card) 90+2'	Report	(yellow card) 27' Abu Fani; (yellow card) 62' Atzili; (yellow card) 90' Donyoh; (red card) 90+2' Mohamed	Stadium: Central Stadium; Referee: Viktor Kopiievskyi (UKR); Assistant referees: Viktor Matyash (UKR); Oleksandr Zhukov (UKR); Fourth official: Mykola Balakin (UKR)

== UEFA Europa Conference League ==
=== Qualifying phase ===
==== Second qualifying round ====
22 July 2021 1st leg	Dinamo Tbilisi (Georgia (country))	1–2	(Israel) Maccabi Haifa	Tbilisi
19:30 (IST)	Giorgi Kutsia (yellow card) 50'; Sporkslede (yellow card) 79'; Papava 88'; Osei (yellow card) 90+6'	Report	8' Atzili; (yellow card) 12' Abu Fani; (yellow card) 33' Planić; (yellow card) 62' Rodríguez; 66' David; (yellow card) 88' Menahem	Stadium: Boris Paichadze Dinamo Arena; Referee: Lukas Fähndrich (SUI); Assistant referees: Sladan Josipović (SUI); Pascal Hirzel (SUI); Fourth official: Sebastian Gishamer (AUT)

29 July 2021 2nd leg	Maccabi Haifa (Israel)	5–1 (7–2 agg.)	(Georgia (country)) Dinamo Tbilisi	Haifa
20:00 (IST)	Levi 17'; Sporkslede 37' (o.g.); Meir (yellow card) 40'; Rodríguez (yellow card) 46'; Atzili 75'; Ashkenazi 81', 85'	Report	(yellow card) 21' Papava; 24' Osei; (yellow card) 31' Bakar Kardava; (yellow card) 80' Nodar Iashvili; (yellow card) 87' Giorgi Kutsia	Stadium: Sammy Ofer Stadium; Attendance: 15,143; Referee: Amine Kourgheli (BLR); Assistant referees: Yury Khomchenko (BLR); Viktor Getskov (BLR); Fourth official: Denis Scherbakov (BLR)

==== Third qualifying round ====
5 August 2021 1st leg	Maccabi Haifa (Israel)	7–2	(Faroe Islands) HB Tórshavn	Haifa
20:00 (IST)	David 6', 24'; Haziza 45+5'; Menahem (yellow card) 49'; Gershon 62'; Sahar 74'; Atzili 82'; Ashkenazi 90+2'	Report	29' Mikkel Dahl; (yellow card) 36' (yellow-red card) 60' Hansen; (yellow card) 56' Joensen; 70' (pen.) Johansen	Stadium: Sammy Ofer Stadium; Attendance: 16,257; Referee: Erik Lambrechts (BEL); Assistant referees: Rien Vanyzere (BEL); Jo de Weirdt (BEL); Fourth official: Nathan Verboomen (BEL)

12 August 2021 2nd leg	HB Tórshavn (Faroe Islands)	1–0 (3–7 agg.)	(Israel) Maccabi Haifa	Tórshavn
21:45 (IST)	Michał Przybylski 20', (yellow card) 75'; Justinussen (yellow card) 78'; Thomsen (yellow card) 90+4'	Report	(yellow card) 74' Haziza	Stadium: Gundadalur; Attendance: 417; Referee: Horatiu Fesnic (ROU)); Assistant referees: Valentin Avram (ROU); Valentin Avram (ROU); Fourth official: Horia Gabriel Mladinovici (ROU)

==== Play-off round ====
19 August 2021 1st leg	Neftçi (Azerbaijan)	3–3	(Israel) Maccabi Haifa	Baku, Azerbaijan
20:00 (IDT)	Mbodj (yellow card) 28'; Ismayil Zulfuqarli (yellow card) 43' (yellow-red card) 77'; Lawal 50', 66', (yellow card) 52'; Mahmudov (yellow card) 57', (goal) 72'	Report	(yellow card) 7' Mohamed; 9' Atzili; (yellow card) 49' Abu Fani; 78', 90+6' Chery; (yellow card) 90+8' Strain	Stadium: Bakcell Arena; Referee: Willy Delajod (FRA); Assistant referees: Mehdi Rahmouni (FRA); Erwan Christophe Finjean (FRA); Fourth official: Thomas Leonard (FRA)

26 August 2021 2nd leg	Maccabi Haifa (Israel)	4–0 (7–3 agg.)	(Azerbaijan) Neftçi	Haifa
20:00 (IDT)	Strain (yellow card) 8'; Menahem 20'; Dahan (yellow card) 27'; Atzili 45+2'; Haziza (yellow card) 45+3', (goal) 52' (pen.); Abu Fani 69'	Report	(yellow card) 52' Mahmudov; (yellow card) 53' Kané	Stadium: Sammy Ofer Stadium; Attendance: 18,532; Referee: Aleksandar Stavrev (MKD); Assistant referees: Dejan Kostadinov (MKD); Goce Petreski (MKD); Fourth official: Dejan Jakimovksi (MKD)

=== Group stage ===
Pos	Team	Pld	W	D	L	GF	GA	GD	Pts	Qualification	FEY	SLA	UNI	MHA
1	(Netherlands) Feyenoord	6	4	2	0	11	6	+5	14	Advance to round of 16	—	2–1	3–1	2–1
2	(Czech Republic) Slavia Prague	6	2	2	2	8	7	+1	8	Advance to knockout round play-offs	2–2	—	3–1	1–0
3	(Germany) Union Berlin	6	2	1	3	8	9	−1	7		1–2	1–1	—	3–0
4	(Israel) Maccabi Haifa	6	1	1	4	2	7	−5	4		0–0	1–0	0–1	—

Source: UEFA
Legend: Blue = home team win; Yellow = draw; Red = away team win.
Rules for classification: Group stage tiebreakers

14 September 2021	Maccabi Haifa (Israel)	0–0	(Netherlands) Feyenoord	Sammy Ofer Stadium, Haifa
16:30 (17:30 IDT)	Menachem (yellow card) 45+3'; Rodríguez (yellow card) 77'; Donyoh (yellow card) 90+1'; Chery (yellow card) 90+4'	Report	(yellow card) 44' Til	Attendance: 16,364; Referee: Fabio Maresca (Italy)

30 September 2021	Union Berlin (Germany)	3–0	(Israel) Maccabi Haifa	Olympiastadion, Berlin
21:00	Voglsammer 33'; Behrens (yellow card) 42', (goal) 48'; Trimmel (yellow card) 70'; Awoniyi 76'; Haraguchi (yellow card) 88'	Report	Planić (yellow card) 27'; Dahan (yellow card) 32'	Attendance: 23,342; Referee: Nick Walsh (Scotland)

21 October 2021	Maccabi Haifa (Israel)	1–0	(Czech Republic) Slavia Prague	Sammy Ofer Stadium, Haifa
18:45 (19:45 IDT)	Goldberg (yellow card) 9'; Donyoh 24'; Tawatha (yellow card) 41'; Cohen (yellow card) 71'	Report	(yellow card) 45' Bah; (yellow card) 90+1' Samek	Attendance: 17,136; Referee: Ádám Farkas (Hungary)

4 November 2021	Slavia Prague (Czech Republic)	1–0	(Israel) Maccabi Haifa	Sinobo Stadium, Prague
21:00	Masopust (yellow card) 8'; Kuchta 49', (yellow card) 63'; Dorley (yellow card) 54'; Kacharaba (yellow card) 88'	Report	(yellow card) 32' Menachem; (yellow card) 50' Chery; (yellow card) 50' Cohen; (yellow card) 88' Atzili; (yellow card) 90+3' Planić	Attendance: 13,646; Referee: Kai Erik Steen (Norway)

25 November 2021	Maccabi Haifa (Israel)	0–1	(Germany) Union Berlin	Sammy Ofer Stadium, Haifa
18:45 (19:45 IST)	Chery (yellow card) 33'; Atzili (yellow card) 77'	Report	66' Ryerson; (yellow card) 70' Prömel; (yellow card) 74' Becker; (yellow card) 90+1' Baumgartl	Attendance: 22,150; Referee: Michal Ocenáš (Slovakia)

9 December 2021	Feyenoord (Netherlands)	2–1	(Israel) Maccabi Haifa	De Kuip, Rotterdam
21:00	Dessers 38'; Diemers (yellow card) 42'; Teixeira (yellow card) 52'; Nelson 65'; Mimeirhel Benita (yellow card) 90+2'	Report	(yellow card) 30' Abu Fani; (yellow card) 73' Levi; 90+1' David	Attendance: 0 Referee: Mykola Balakin (UKR)

== Statistics ==
=== Squad statistics ===
			Ligat HaAl					State Cup					Toto Cup					Israel Super Cup					UEL/ECL					Total				
Nation	No.	Name		GS	Min.	Goal	As.		GS	Min.	Goal	As.		GS	Min.	Goal	As.		GS	Min.	Goal	As.		GS	Min.	Goal	As.		GS	Min.	Goal	As.
Goalkeepers
(Israel) (United States)	44	Josh Cohen	33	33	3,259	0	0	0	0	0	0	0	1	1	102	0	0	1	1	100	0	0	13	13	1,160	0	0	48	48	4,621	0	0
(Israel)	52	Itamar Israeli	0	0	0	0	0	0	0	0	0	0	0	0	0	0	0	0	0	0	0	0	0	0	0	0	0	0	0	0	0	0
(Israel)	77	Roee Fucs	1	0	39	0	0	1	1	133	0	0	0	0	0	0	0	0	0	0	0	0	0	0	0	0	0	2	1	172	0	0
(Israel)	90	Roi Mishpati	2	2	153	0	0	5	5	473	0	0	1	1	95	0	0	0	0	0	0	0	1	1	95	0	0	9	9	817	0	0
Defenders
(Israel)	3	Sean Goldberg	31	27	2,738	0	1	4	3	208	0	0	2	2	198	0	0	1	0	16	0	0	7	5	512	0	0	45	37	3,672	0	1
(Serbia)	5	Bogdan Planić	32	32	3,019	0	1	4	3	387	0	0	1	1	96	0	0	1	1	84	0	0	10	10	917	0	0	48	47	4,503	0	1
(Israel)	12	Sun Menahem	39	19	1,994	2	1	5	5	397	0	2	0	0	0	0	0	1	1	100	0	0	11	9	842	0	0	47	34	3,333	3	3
(Israel)	15	Ofri Arad	21	10	1,063	1	0	5	4	396	1	0	0	0	0	0	0	0	0	0	0	0	5	2	243	0	0	31	16	1,702	2	0
(Israel)	17	Taleb Tawatha	3	1	95	0	0	0	0	0	0	0	1	1	45	0	0	0	0	0	0	0	3	2	132	0	0	7	4	272	0	0
(Guadeloupe)	23	Mickaël Alphonse	15	12	1,226	0	0	3	1	212	0	0	0	0	0	0	0	0	0	0	0	0	0	0	0	0	0	18	13	1,438	0	0
(Israel)	24	Ori Dahan	3	1	137	0	0	2	1	112	0	0	2	2	198	0	0	1	1	63	0	0	9	6	613	0	0	17	11	1,123	0	0
(Israel)	25	Raz Meir	19	16	1,512	0	2	4	4	330	0	0	2	0	102	0	0	0	1	1	100	0	14	12	1,124	0	0	40	33	3,168	0	3
(Israel)	55	Rami Gershon	11	0	258	0	0	3	1	146	0	0	1	1	51	0	0	1	0	37	0	0	10	9	89	0	0	26	11	1,371	1	0
Midfielders
(Niger)	4	Ali Mohamed	35	28	3,519	0	2	3	1	98	0	0	2	1	121	0	0	1	1	100	0	0	8	7	759	1	0	49	38	3,597	0	5
(Israel)	6	Neta Lavi	19	9	913	0	1	5	2	319	1	0	0	0	0	0	0	0	0	0	0	0	2	1	28	0	0	26	12	1,260	1	1
(Israel)	7	Omer Atzili	33	31	2,867	20	10	5	4	463	2	1	2	0	87	0	1	1	1	84	0	0	12	9	848	6	3	53	45	4,349	28	15
(Israel)	8	Dolev Haziza	30	29	2,606	9	6	4	3	324	0	0	1	0	51	0	1	0	0	0	0	0	13	9	1,006	2	2	48	41	3,987	11	9
(Suriname)	10	Tjaronn Chery	33	29	2,754	9	7	4	3	300	2	0	2	1	132	0	0	1	1	100	0	0	13	12	1,083	2	5	53	46	4,369	13	12
(Spain)	14	José Rodríguez	27	22	2,012	0	3	5	3	260	0	0	2	1	93	0	0	1	0	26	0	0	13	12	1,063	0	0	48	38	3,454	0	3
(Israel)	16	Mohammad Abu Fani	26	23	1,939	3	4	6	4	380	1	1	1	1	102	1	0	1	1	100	1	0	11	9	768	1	1	45	38	3,289	7	6
(Israel)	26	Mahmoud Jaber	22	9	959	3	4	3	2	195	0	0	2	2	162	0	0	0	0	0	0	0	5	3	223	0	0	32	16	1,539	3	6
(Israel)	32	Anan Khalaily	0	0	0	0	0	1	0	30	0	0	0	0	0	0	0	0	0	0	0	0	0	0	0	0	0	1	0	30	0	0
(Israel)	33	Maor Levi	14	1	380	3	0	5	4	360	0	2	2	2	111	0	0	1	0	16	0	0	8	3	349	1	0	30	10	1,225	4	2
Forwards
(Israel)	9	Ben Sahar	20	2	408	1	1	3	2	138	0	0	1	1	86	0	0	1	1	63	1	0	11	3	473	1	1	36	9	1,168	3	2
(Ghana)	11	Godsway Donyoh	26	9	1,131	5	4	4	3	296	0	0	1	1	66	0	0	1	0	36	0	1	10	6	487	1	0	42	19	2,010	6	5
(Republic of the Congo)	13	Mavis Tchibota	13	3	552	2	0	4	3	296	0	0	0	0	0	0	0	0	0	0	0	0	0	0	0	0	0	16	5	725	2	0
(Israel)	21	Dean David	34	28	2,494	15	5	5	3	260	4	0	2	0	72	2	0	1	1	74	0	0	14	8	750	4	1	56	40	3,650	25	5
Players who have made an appearance this season but have left the club
(Australia)	2	Ryan Strain	7	4	353	0	0	1	1	64	0	0	1	1	51	0	0	0	0	0	0	0	3	2	179	0	0	12	8	647	0	0
(Israel)	18	Yuval Ashkenazi	8	1	167	0	0	2	0	36	0	0	2	2	111	0	0	0	0	0	0	0	6	2	251	3	0	18	5	565	3	0
(Israel)	34	Roey Elimelech	1	0	15	0	1	0	0	0	0	0	0	0	0	0	0	0	0	0	0	0	0	0	0	0	0	1	0	15	0	1
(Israel)	36	Adar Azruel	0	0	0	0	0	0	0	0	0	0	0	0	0	0	0	0	0	0	0	0	1	0	34	0	0	1	0	34	0	0

=== Goals ===
Rank	Player	Position	Ligat HaAl	State Cup	Toto Cup	Israel Super Cup	UCL/ECL	Total
1	(Israel) Omer Atzili	MF	20	2	0	0	6	28
2	(Israel) Dean David	FW	15	4	2	0	4	25
3	(Suriname) Tjaronn Chery	MF	9	2	0	0	2	13
4	(Israel) Dolev Haziza	MF	9	0	0	0	2	11
5	(Israel) Mohammad Abu Fani	MF	3	1	1	1	1	7
6	(Ghana) Godsway Donyoh	FW	5	0	0	0	1	6
7	(Israel) Maor Levi	MF	3	0	0	0	1	4
8	(Israel) Mahmoud Jaber	MF	3	0	0	0	0	3
8	(Israel) Sun Menahem	DF	2	0	0	0	1	3
8	(Israel) Ben Sahar	FW	1	0	0	1	1	3
8	(Israel) Yuval Ashkenazi	MF	0	0	0	0	3	3
12	(Israel) Ofri Arad	DF	1	1	0	0	0	2
12	(Republic of the Congo) Mavis Tchibota	FW	2	0	0	0	0	2
14	(Israel) Neta Lavi	MF	0	1	0	0	0	1
14	(Israel) Rami Gershon	DF	0	0	0	0	1	1
Own goals			3	2	0	0	1	6

=== Clean sheets ===
Rank	Pos.	No.	Name	Ligat HaAl	State Cup	Toto Cup	Israel Super Cup	UEL/ECL	Total
1	GK	44	(United States) (Israel) Josh Cohen	16		1	1	3	21
2	GK	90	(Israel) Roi Mishpati		5				5
3	GK	77	(Israel) Roee Fucs	1	0				1

=== Disciplinary record for Ligat Ha'Al and State Cup ===
No.	Pos	Nat	Name	Ligat Ha'Al			State Cup			Total		
No.	Pos	Nat	Name	Yellow card	(yellow card) (yellow-red card)	Red card	Yellow card	(yellow card) (yellow-red card)	Red card	Yellow card	(yellow card) (yellow-red card)	Red card
8	MF	(Israel)	Dolev Haziza	12						12		
4	DF	(Niger)	Ali Mohamed	8						8		
5	DF	(Serbia)	Bogdan Planić	7			1			8		
12	DF	(Israel)	Sun Menahem	5			1			6		
16	MF	(Israel)	Mohammad Abu Fani	5	2		2			7	2	
14	MF	(Spain)	José Rodríguez	3			2			5		
21	FW	(Israel)	Dean David	5						5		
25	DF	(Israel)	Raz Meir	4		1				4		1
33	MF	(Israel)	Maor Levi	3			1			4		
3	DF	(Israel)	Sean Goldberg	5						5		
55	DF	(Israel)	Rami Gershon	3			1			4		
7	MF	(Israel)	Omer Atzili	3		1				3		1
15	DF	(Israel)	Ofri Arad	2		1	1			3		1
10	MF	(Suriname)	Tjaronn Chery	3						3		
11	FW	(Ghana)	Godsway Donyoh	2						2		
44	GK	(United States) (Israel)	Josh Cohen	1						1		
23	DF	(Guadeloupe)	Mickaël Alphonse	1						1		
90	GK	(Israel)	Roi Mishpati	1						1		

=== Disciplinary record for Champions League and Europa Conference League ===
No.	Pos	Nat	Name	Qualification			Group stage			Total		
No.	Pos	Nat	Name	Yellow card	(yellow card) (yellow-red card)	Red card	Yellow card	(yellow card) (yellow-red card)	Red card	Yellow card	(yellow card) (yellow-red card)	Red card
16	MF	(Israel)	Mohammad Abu Fani	4			1			5		
12	DF	(Israel)	Sun Menahem	2			2			4		
11	FW	(Ghana)	Godsway Donyoh	2			1			3		
7	MF	(Israel)	Omer Atzili	1			2			3		
5	DF	(Serbia)	Bogdan Planić	1			2			3		
14	MF	(Spain)	José Rodríguez	2			1			3		
8	MF	(Israel)	Dolev Haziza	2						2		
2	DF	(Australia)	Ryan Strain	2						2		
24	DF	(Israel)	Ori Dahan	1			1			2		
10	MF	(Suriname)	Tjaronn Chery				2			2		
3	DF	(Israel)	Sean Goldberg				2			2		
44	GK	(United States) (Israel)	Josh Cohen				2			2		
4	MF	(Niger)	Ali Mohamed	1		1				1		1
25	DF	(Israel)	Raz Meir	1						1		
17	DF	(Israel)	Taleb Tawatha				1			1		
33	DF	(Israel)	Maor Levi				1			1		

=== Suspensions ===
Player	Date Received	Offence	Length of suspension		
Dolev Haziza	9 June 2021	Discipline	3 Match	Maccabi Tel Aviv (H); Hapoel Tel Aviv (H); Hapoel Hadera (A)	25 July 2021; 22 August 2021; 29 August 2021
Ali Mohamed	14 July 2021	(red card) 90+2' vs FC Kairat (A)	2 Match	Dinamo Tbilisi (A); Dinamo Tbilisi (H)	22 July 2021; 29 July 2021
Mohammad Abu Fani	22 July 2021	(yellow card) 12' vs Dinamo Tbilisi (A)	1 Match	Dinamo Tbilisi (H)	29 July 2021
Omer Atzili	3 October 2021	(red card) 84' Hapoel Be'er Sheva (H)	1 Match	Hapoel Jerusalem (A)	16 October 2021
Ofri Arad	3 October 2021	(red card) 90+4' Hapoel Be'er Sheva (H)	1 Match	Hapoel Jerusalem (A)	16 October 2021
Sun Menahem	4 November 2021	(yellow card) 32' vs Slavia Prague (A)	1 Match	Union Berlin (H)	25 November 2021
Tjaronn Chery	25 November 2021	(yellow card) 33' vs Union Berlin (H)	1 Match	Feyenoord (A)	9 December 2021
Dolev Haziza	2 December 2021	(yellow card) 45' vs Hapeol Haifa (H)	1 Match	Beitar Jerusalem (H)	13 December 2021
Bogdan Planić	18 December 2021	(yellow card) 77' vs Hapeol Jerusalem (A)	1 Match	Bnei Sakhnin (H)	25 December 2021
Ali Mohamed	3 January 2022	(yellow card) 34' vs Maccabi Tel Aviv (H)	1 Match	Beitar Jerusalem (H)	12 January 2022
Raz Meir	17 January 2022	(red card) 45' Hapoel Be'er Sheva (A)	1 Match	Hapoel Jerusalem (H)	22 January 2022
Mohammad Abu Fani	22 January 2022	(yellow card) 16' (yellow-red card) 51' vs Hapoel Jerusalem (H)	1 Match	Maccabi Netanya (A)	30 January 2022
Bogdan Planić	26 January 2022	Discipline	1 Match	Maccabi Netanya (A)	30 January 2022
Sun Menahem	30 January 2022	(yellow card) 65' vs Maccabi Netanya (A)	1 Match	F.C. Ashdod (H)	7 February 2022
Mohammad Abu Fani	14 February 2022	(yellow card) 90' vs Ironi Kiryat Shmona (A)	1 Match	Hapoel Haifa (A)	26 February 2022
Dolev Haziza	4 April 2022	(yellow card) 29' Hapoel Be'er Sheva (H)	1 Match	Bnei Sakhnin (H)	16 April 2022
José Rodríguez	4 April 2022	(yellow card) 65' Hapoel Be'er Sheva (H)	1 Match	Bnei Sakhnin (H)	16 April 2022
Sean Goldberg	23 April 2022	(yellow card) 88' Maccabi Netanya (A)	1 Match	Hapoel Be'er Sheva (A)	7 May 2022
Mohammad Abu Fani	7 May 2022	(yellow card) 31' (yellow-red card) 50' vs Hapoel Be'er Sheva (A)	1 Match	Maccabi Tel Aviv (H)	10 May 2022
Dean David	7 May 2022	(yellow card) 61' Hapoel Be'er Sheva (A)	1 Match	Maccabi Netanya (H)	21 May 2022
Dolev Haziza	7 May 2022	(yellow card) 62' Hapoel Be'er Sheva (A)	1 Match	Maccabi Netanya (H)	21 May 2022

=== Penalties ===
Date	Penalty Taker	Scored	Opponent	Competition
26 August 2021	(Israel) Dolev Haziza	Yes	Neftçi	Conference League
11 September 2021	(Israel) Omer Atzili	Yes	Bnei Sakhnin	Liga Ha`Al
3 October 2021	(Israel) Dolev Haziza	Yes	Hapoel Be'er Sheva	Liga Ha`Al
28 November 2021	(Israel) Omer Atzili	Yes	Hapoel Tel Aviv	Liga Ha`Al
12 January 2022	(Israel) Mohammad Abu Fani	Yes	Beitar Jerusalem	State Cup
21 May 2022	(Republic of the Congo) Mavis Tchibota	Yes	Maccabi Netanya	Liga Ha`Al
24 May 2022	(Israel) Omer Atzili	Yes	Hapoel Be'er Sheva	State Cup

=== Overall ===
	Total	Home	Away	Natural
Games played	59	30	26	3
Games won	37	23	12	2
Games drawn	9	4	5	N/A
Games lost	12	3	9	1
Biggest win	6-0 vs Bnei Sakhnin; 6-0 vs F.C. Ashdod	6-0 vs F.C. Ashdod	6-0 vs Bnei Sakhnin	2-0 vs Hapoel Haifa
Biggest loss	0-3 vs Union Berlin; 0-3 vs Maccabi Netanya	1-3 vs Maccabi Tel Aviv	0-3 vs Union Berlin; 0-3 vs Maccabi Netanya	N/A
Biggest win (League)	6-0 vs Bnei Sakhnin; 6-0 vs F.C. Ashdod	6-0 vs F.C. Ashdod	6-0 vs Bnei Sakhnin	N/A
Biggest loss (League)	0-3 vs Maccabi Netanya	1-3 vs Maccabi Tel Aviv	0-3 vs Maccabi Netanya	N/A
Biggest win (Cup)	4-0 vs Beitar Jerusalem	4-0 vs Beitar Jerusalem	2-0 vs Hapoel Hadera	2-0 vs Hapoel Haifa
Biggest loss (Cup)	1-3 (p) vs Hapoel Be'er Sheva	N/A	N/A	1-3 (p) vs Hapoel Be'er Sheva
Biggest win (Toto)	2-0 vs Hapoel Tel Aviv	2-0 vs Hapoel Tel Aviv	N/A	7-6 (p) vs Hapoel Be'er Sheva
Biggest loss (Toto)	N/A	N/A	N/A	N/A
Biggest win (Europe)	7-2 vs HB Tórshavn	7-2 vs HB Tórshavn	2-1 vs Dinamo Tbilisi	N/A
Biggest loss (Europe)	0-3 vs Union Berlin	0-1 vs Union Berlin	0-3 vs Union Berlin	N/A
Goals scored	121	72	44	5
Goals conceded	48	16	29	3
Goal difference	+73	+56	+15	+2
Clean sheets	27	17	9	1
Average GF per game	2.05	2.4	1.69	1.67
Average GA per game	0.8	0.53	1.12	1
Yellow cards	145	70	64	11
Red cards	5	2	3	N/A
Most appearances	(Israel) Dean David (56)			
Most minutes played	(United States) (Israel) Josh Cohen (4,621)			
Most goals	(Israel) Omer Atzili (28)			
Most Assist	(Israel) Omer Atzili (15)			
Penalties for	7	5	1	1
Penalties scored	7	5	1	1
Penalties against	7	4	3	N/A
Penalties saved	7	4	3	N/A
Winning rate	59.32%	73.33%	42.31%	66.67%
