= Itamar Israeli =

Israeli footballer

Personal information
- Full name: Itamar Israeli
- Date of birth: March 22, 1992 (age 34)
- Place of birth: Holon, Israel
- Height: 1.85 m (6 ft 1 in)
- Position: Goalkeeper

Team information
- Current team: Ironi Modi'in
- Number: 22

Youth career
- Hapoel Tzafririm Holon
- Bnei Yehuda

Senior career*
Years	Team	Apps	(Gls)
2011–2018	Bnei Yehuda	3	(0)
2013	→ Hapoel Herzliya	10	(0)
2014	Hapoel Nof HaGalil	3	(0)
2014–2015	→ Hapoel Morasha	28	(0)
2017	→ Hapoel Rishon LeZion	32	(0)
2018	→ Hapoel Marmorek	19	(0)
2018–2021	Hapoel Kfar Saba	84	(0)
2021–2023	Maccabi Haifa	0	(0)
2022–2023	→ Beitar Jerusalem	18	(0)
2024	Ihud Bnei Shefa-'Amr	13	(0)
2024–2026	Hapoel Ramat Gan	56	(0)
2026–	Hapoel Ramat Gan	0	(0)
- * Club domestic league appearances and goals as of 24 June 2026

Itamar Israeli (Hebrew: איתמר ישראלי; born 22 March 1992) is an Israeli professional footballer who plays as a goalkeeper for Liga Leumit club Ironi Modi'in.

== Career ==
Israeli started his career for Hapoel Tzafririm Holon's children team and later moved to Bnei Yehuda. loaned for Hapoel Herzliya, Hapoel Nof HaGalil, Hapoel Morasha, Hapoel Rishon LeZion and Hapoel Marmorek.

In summer 2018 signed for Hapoel Kfar Saba and promoted to the Israeli Premier League in his first season.

On 24 June 2021 signed for Maccabi Haifa.

On 17 July 2022 loaned for Beitar Jerusalem.

== Honours ==
Maccabi Haifa

- Israeli Premier League: 2021–22
- Israel Super Cup: 2021–22
- Toto Cup Al: 2021–22

Beitar Jerusalem

- Israel State Cup: 2022–23
