= Godsway Donyoh =

Ghanaian footballer (born 1994)

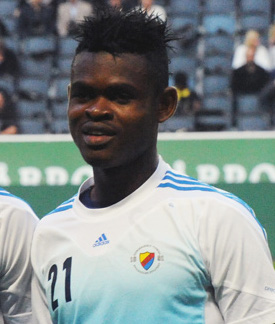
- Donyoh with Djurgårdens IF in 2013

Personal information
- Date of birth: 14 October 1994 (age 32)
- Place of birth: Accra, Ghana
- Height: 1.80 m (5 ft 11 in)
- Position: Striker

Team information
- Current team: Hapoel Hadera
- Number: 10

Youth career
- –2011: Right to Dream
- 2011–2016: Manchester City U21

Senior career*
Years	Team	Apps	(Gls)
2013–2015	Manchester City	0	(0)
2013	→ Djurgårdens IF (loan)	20	(2)
2014–2015	→ Falkenbergs FF (loan)	29	(6)
2016–2020	Nordsjælland	76	(26)
2020	→ Dynamo Dresden (loan)	7	(0)
2020–2022	Maccabi Haifa	54	(13)
2022–2023	Neftçi	15	(4)
2023–2024	Apollon Limassol	13	(3)
2024–	Hapoel Hadera	36	(6)
- * Club domestic league appearances and goals as of 27 June 2025

Godsway Donyoh (born 14 October 1994) is a Ghanaian professional footballer who plays as a striker for Hapoel Hadera in the Israeli Premier League.

== Career ==
=== Manchester City ===
Born in Accra, Donyoh progressed through the Right to Dream academy and moved to English club Manchester City as a 17-year-old. He progressed through the youth system, before it was decided that he was to be loaned out.

==== Loans to Sweden ====
From there, he was loaned out to Swedish club Djurgårdens IF in 2013 through a cooperation agreement between the clubs, in order to receive more playing time. This was agreed upon after impressing in a trial over three games. In the 2012–13 Svenska Cupen, Donyoh reached the final with the club where they eventually lost to IF Elfsborg. In the league, he made 20 appearances in which made two goals and contributed with two assists. He also made thirteen appearances for the Djurgården U21 in which he scored 10 goals and made one assist. After the season, Manchester City informed Djurgården that his loan could be extended, but that Donyoh would have to be utilised as a forward instead of as a winger; the position where Djurgården had mostly played him. The Swedish club could not guarantee playing time as a forward, and it was therefore decided that Donyoh would return to Manchester City.

After his return to England, Donyoh took part in team training before being loaned out to another Swedish Allsvenskan club, this time to Falkenbergs FF. He scored his first goal for Falkenbergs FF on 12 May 2014 against his former club Djurgården – a 90th-minute goal securing a 1–0 win. In 35 competitive games for the first team and the U21, he scored seven goals and made four assists. At the end of 2015 season, Falkenbergs FF won out in a relegation battle with IK Sirius, and thus ensured a place in the top division for the following season.

=== Nordsjælland ===
Having made no appearances for Manchester City since his arrival in 2011, Donyoh was signed on a permanent deal by Danish Superliga club Nordsjælland ahead of the 2015–16 season; a club also involved in the Right to Dream academy. Donyoh's most successful season for the club was during the 2018–19 season, where he managed to score ten goals and make two assists in 28 league appearances. As Nordsjælland had finished third in the previous year's Superliga, he took part in the Europa League qualifying rounds with the team, who were eventually knocked out in the third round against Serbian club Partizan.

==== Loan to Dynamo Dresden ====
After making only nine appearances during the 2018–19 season, three of them for the Nordsjælland reserves, Donyoh was loaned with an option to buy to German 2. Bundesliga club Dynamo Dresden in January 2020.

=== Maccabi Haifa ===
On 26 September 2020, Donyoh signed a two-year contract with Maccabi Haifa in the Israeli Premier League, in a deal estimated at €100,000. He made his debut for the club on 1 October 2020 in the UEFA Europa League qualifiers in a 7–2 loss to Tottenham Hotspur. He made his league debut on 7 October in his team's 1–2 home win over Ashdod.

== Career statistics ==
As of match played 27 February 2023

Appearances and goals by club, season and competition
Club	Season	League			National cup (Note: Includes Svenska Cupen, Danish Cup, Israel State Cup, Azerbaijan Cup)		League cup (Note: Includes Toto Cup)		Continental		Other		Total	
Club	Season	Division	Apps	Goals	Apps	Goals	Apps	Goals	Apps	Goals	Apps	Goals	Apps	Goals
Djurgårdens IF (loan)	2013	Allsvenskan	20	2	3	0	—		—		—		23	2
Falkenbergs FF (loan)	2014	Allsvenskan	16	4	0	0	—		—		—		16	4
Falkenbergs FF (loan)	2015	Allsvenskan	13	2	1	0	—		—		1 (Note: Appearance in Allsvenskan relegation play-offs)	0	15	2
Falkenbergs FF (loan)	Total		29	6	1	0	—		—		1	0	31	6
Nordsjælland	2015–16	Danish Superliga	4	0	0	0	—		—		—		4	0
Nordsjælland	2016–17	Danish Superliga	26	9	2	1	—		—		—		28	10
Nordsjælland	2017–18	Danish Superliga	12	6	0	0	—		—		—		12	6
Nordsjælland	2018–19	Danish Superliga	28	10	1	0	—		3 (Note: Appearances in UEFA Europa League)	1	—		32	11
Nordsjælland	2019–20	Danish Superliga	6	1	0	0	—		—		—		6	1
Nordsjælland	Total		76	26	3	1	—		3	1	—		82	28
Dynamo Dresden	2019–20	2. Bundesliga	7	0	0	0	—		—		—		7	0
Maccabi Haifa	2020–21	Israeli Premier League	28	8	3	1	0	0	1	0	—		32	9
Maccabi Haifa	2021–22	Israeli Premier League	26	5	4	0	1	0	10 (Note: Two appearances in UEFA Champions League, eight appearances and one goal in UEFA Europa Conference League)	1	1 (Note: Appearance in Israel Super Cup)	0	42	6
Maccabi Haifa	Total		54	13	7	1	1	0	11	1	1	0	74	15
Neftçi	2022–23	Azerbaijan Premier League	15	4	2	0	—		4 (Note: Appearances in UEFA Europa Conference League)	1	—		21	5
Apollon Limassol	2022–23	Cypriot First Division	13	3	0	0	—		—		—		13	3
Hapoel Hadera	2023–24	Israeli Premier League	0	0	0	0	—		—		—		0	0
Career total			214	54	16	2	1	0	18	3	2	0	251	59

== Honours ==
Maccabi Haifa

- Israeli Premier League: 2020–21, 2021–22
- Toto Cup: 2021–22
- Israel Super Cup: 2021
