= Tawatha =

Tawatha is a given name and surname. Notable people with the name include:

- Tawatha Agee (born 1954), American singer
- Taleb Tawatha (born 1992), Israeli footballer
