= Dean David =

Israeli association footballer

Personal information
- Full name: Dean David
- Date of birth: 14 March 1996 (age 30)
- Place of birth: Nehora, Israel
- Height: 1.84 m (6 ft 0 in)
- Position: Forward

Team information
- Current team: Yokohama F. Marinos
- Number: 26

Youth career
- 2007–2013: Hapoel Ashkelon
- 2013–2016: Ashdod

Senior career*
Years	Team	Apps	(Gls)
2013–2021	Ashdod	162	(38)
2021–2025	Maccabi Haifa	128	(58)
2025–	Yokohama F. Marinos	24	(3)

International career^{‡}
2014	Israel U19	6	(0)
2015–2016	Israel U21	8	(1)
2022–	Israel	9	(1)
- * Club domestic league appearances and goals as of 11 August 2026 ‡ National team caps and goals as of 22 March 2025

Dean David (or Din, Hebrew: דין דוד; born 14 March 1996) is an Israeli footballer who plays as a forward for J.League club Yokohama F. Marinos and the Israel football team.

== Early life ==
David was born and raised in Nehora, Israel, to a family of Jewish descent. His younger brother Yanay David is also a footballer who plays for Israeli club Bnei Eilat.

He was enlisted to serve as a soldier in the Israel Defense Forces in 2014.

== Club career ==
=== Maccabi Haifa ===
On 5 October 2022, David scored both his debut goal as well as his Israeli side's first away goal in the 2022–23 UEFA Champions League group stage, coming on as 72nd-minute substitute against Italian side Juventus, in a match that ended in a 1–3 away loss for Maccabi Haifa.

== International career ==
He has been a youth international for the Israel U-19 in 2014, and for the Israel U-21 from 2015 to 2016.

David was first called up to the Israeli senior side on 17 March 2022, ahead of the friendly matches against Germany and Romania. He made his senior debut for the Israel national team on 26 March 2022, coming on as 63rd-minute substitute against Germany, in a friendly match that ended in a 0–2 away loss for Israel.

== Career statistics ==
=== Club ===
As of match played 31 August 2024

Appearances and goals by club, season and competition
Club	Season	League			Israel State Cup		Toto Cup		Europe		Other		Total	
Club	Season	Division	Apps	Goals	Apps	Goals	Apps	Goals	Apps	Goals	Apps	Goals	Apps	Goals
Maccabi Haifa	2021–22	Israeli Premier League	34	15	5	4	2	2	14 (Note: Two appearances in UEFA Champions League, twelve appearances and four goals in UEFA Europa Conference League)	4	1 (Note: Appearance in Israel Super Cup)	0	56	25
Maccabi Haifa	2022–23	Israeli Premier League	36	10	4	2	1	1	12 (Note: Appearances in UEFA Champions League)	1	1	0	54	14
Maccabi Haifa	2023–24	Israeli Premier League	28	20	2	0	2	1	13 (Note: Seven appearances and three goals in UEFA Champions League, six appearances and one goal in UEFA Europa League)	4	1	1	46	26
Maccabi Haifa	2024–25	Israeli Premier League	2	3	0	0	2	1	2 (Note: Appearances in UEFA Conference League)	1	–		6	5
Career total			100	48	11	6	7	5	41	10	3	1	162	70

=== International ===
No.	Date	Venue	Opponent	Score	Result	Competition
1.	17 November 2022	HaMoshava Stadium, Petah Tikva, Israel	Zambia	2–0	4–2	Friendly

== Honours ==
Maccabi Haifa

- Israeli Premier League: 2021–22, 2022–23
- Israel Toto Cup (Ligat Ha'Al): 2021–22
- Israel Super Cup: 2021, 2023

== See also ==
- List of Jewish footballers
- Lists of Jews in sports
- List of Israelis
