= Bogdan Planić =

Serbian footballer

Bogdan Planić Богдан Планић
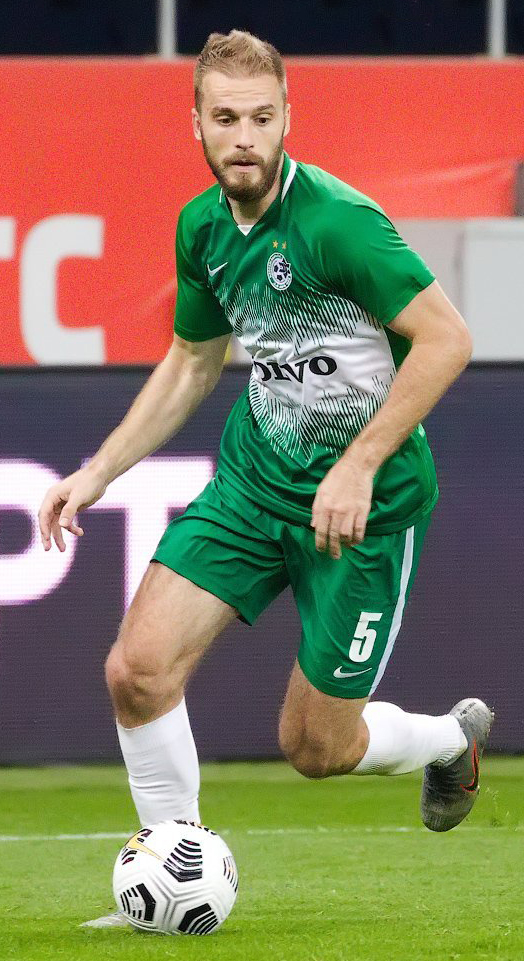
- Planić playing for Maccabi Haifa in 2020

Personal information
- Date of birth: 19 January 1992 (age 34)
- Place of birth: Užice, SFR Yugoslavia
- Height: 1.91 m (6 ft 3 in)
- Position: Centre-back

Team information
- Current team: Shabab Al Ahli
- Number: 4

Youth career
- –2011: Zlatibor Čajetina

Senior career*
Years	Team	Apps	(Gls)
2011	Sloboda Užice	1	(0)
2012	Žarkovo	11	(1)
2012–2013	Jedinstvo Užice	33	(2)
2013–2014	OFK Beograd	29	(1)
2014–2015	Red Star Belgrade	5	(0)
2015–2016	OFK Beograd	36	(1)
2016–2017	Vojvodina	34	(0)
2017–2020	FCSB	71	(1)
2020–2022	Maccabi Haifa	63	(4)
2022–	Shabab Al Ahli	34	(2)

International career
2014	Serbia U21	2	(0)
- * Club domestic league appearances and goals as of 12 April 2025

Bogdan Planić (Serbian Cyrillic: Богдан Планић; born 19 January 1992) is a Serbian professional footballer who plays as a centre-back at Shabab Al Ahli.

== Club career ==
Born in Titovo Užice, Planić started out at Zlatibor Čajetina in the Drina Zone League, before transferring to Serbian SuperLiga club Sloboda Užice in the 2011 winter transfer window. He subsequently switched to Serbian League Belgrade side Žarkovo the following winter. In the summer of 2012, Planić returned to his hometown and joined Serbian First League club Jedinstvo Užice.

While playing for OFK Beograd, Planić was named in the Serbian SuperLiga Team of the Season for the 2013–14 season, securing him a transfer to Red Star Belgrade in July 2014. He, however, returned to OFK Beograd after just six months. In July 2016, Planić signed a two-and-a-half-year contract with Vojvodina. He earned his second selection in the league's best eleven in the 2016–17 season.

In August 2017, after much negotiation, Planić moved abroad to Romanian club, FCSB, where he became one of the most respected players in the squad, sometimes being appointed as captain.

On 6 September 2020, Planić joined Israeli Premier League club Maccabi Haifa, signing a two-year contract. He made his debut for the club in the UEFA Europa League qualifiers match against Kairat Almaty, which ended in a 2–1 victory. He made his league debut in the 2–2 draw against Maccabi Tel Aviv. He scored his first goal for the club on 22 December 2020 in a league match against Bnei Yehuda which ended in a 2–1 victory. Planić quickly became a key player, and helped the club the win 2020–21 Israeli Premier League championship after 10 years. In the 2020–21 season Planić and the club won their second championship in a row as well as the Toto Cup and the Israel super cup. On 24 August 2022, Planić and Maccabi Haifa qualified to UEFA Champions League group stage for the third time in the club's history, after beating Red Star Belgrade, Planić's former club, in the play-offs.

On 26 August 2022, just days after Maccabi Haifa's qualification to UEFA Champions League, Planić signed a three-year contract at Shabab Al Ahli.

== International career ==
In May 2014, Planić was capped twice for Serbia U21, appearing as a substitute in friendly matches against Israel and Austria.

== Career statistics ==
As of 26 May 2024

Appearances and goals by club, season and competition
Club	Season	League			National cup (Note: Includes Serbian Cup, Cupa României, Israeli State Cup, UAE President's Cup)		League cup (Note: Includes Toto Cup, UAE League Cup)		Europe		Other		Total	
Club	Season	Division	Apps	Goals	Apps	Goals	Apps	Goals	Apps	Goals	Apps	Goals	Apps	Goals
Sloboda Užice	2010–11	Serbian SuperLiga	1	0	0	0	—		—		—		1	0
Sloboda Užice	2011–12	Serbian SuperLiga	0	0	0	0	—		—		—		0	0
Sloboda Užice	Total		1	0	0	0	—		—		—		1	0
Žarkovo	2011–12	Serbian League Belgrade	11	1	—		—		—		—		11	1
Jedinstvo Užice	2012–13	Serbian First League	33	2	0	0	—		—		—		33	2
OFK Beograd	2013–14	Serbian SuperLiga	29	1	3	0	—		—		—		32	1
Red Star Belgrade	2014–15	Serbian SuperLiga	5	0	1	0	—		—		—		6	0
OFK Beograd	2014–15	Serbian SuperLiga	6	0	0	0	—		—		—		6	0
OFK Beograd	2015–16	Serbian SuperLiga	30	1	3	0	—		—		—		33	1
OFK Beograd	Total		36	1	3	0	—		—		—		39	1
Vojvodina	2016–17	Serbian SuperLiga	28	0	4	1	—		1 (Note: Appearance(s) in UEFA Europa League)	0	—		33	1
Vojvodina	2017–18	Serbian SuperLiga	6	0	0	0	—		2	0	—		8	0
Vojvodina	Total		34	0	4	1	—		3	0	—		41	1
FCSB	2017–18	Liga I	22	1	0	0	—		6	0	—		28	1
FCSB	2018–19	Liga I	28	0	0	0	—		6	0	—		34	0
FCSB	2019–20	Liga I	21	0	1	0	—		8	0	—		30	0
FCSB	Total		71	1	1	0	—		20	0	—		92	1
Maccabi Haifa	2020–21	Israeli Premier League	31	4	2	0	—		3	0	0	0	36	4
Maccabi Haifa	2021–22	Israeli Premier League	32	0	4	0	1	0	10 (Note: Two appearances in UEFA Champions League, eight appearances in UEFA Europa Conference League)	0	1 (Note: Appearance in Israel Super Cup)	0	48	0
Maccabi Haifa	2022–23	Israeli Premier League	—		—		—		6 (Note: Appearances in UEFA Champions League)	0	1	0	7	0
Maccabi Haifa	Total		63	4	6	0	1	0	19	0	2	0	91	4
Shabab Al Ahli	2022–23	UAE Pro League	0	0	0	0	0	0	—		—		0	0
Shabab Al Ahli	2023–24	UAE Pro League	16	0	3	0	1	1	1 (Note: Appearance in AFC Champions League)	0	0	0	21	1
Shabab Al Ahli	Total		16	0	3	0	1	1	1	0	0	0	21	1
Career total			299	10	21	1	2	1	39	0	2	0	363	12

== Honours ==
FCSB

- Cupa României: 2019–20

Maccabi Haifa

- Israeli Premier League: 2020–21, 2021–22
- Toto Cup: 2021–22
- Israel Super Cup: 2021

Individual

- Serbian SuperLiga Team of the Season: 2013–14, 2016–17
- Liga I Team of the Championship play-offs: 2017–18
- Liga I Team of the Season: 2017–18
