= Taleb Tawatha =

Israeli footballer (born 1992)

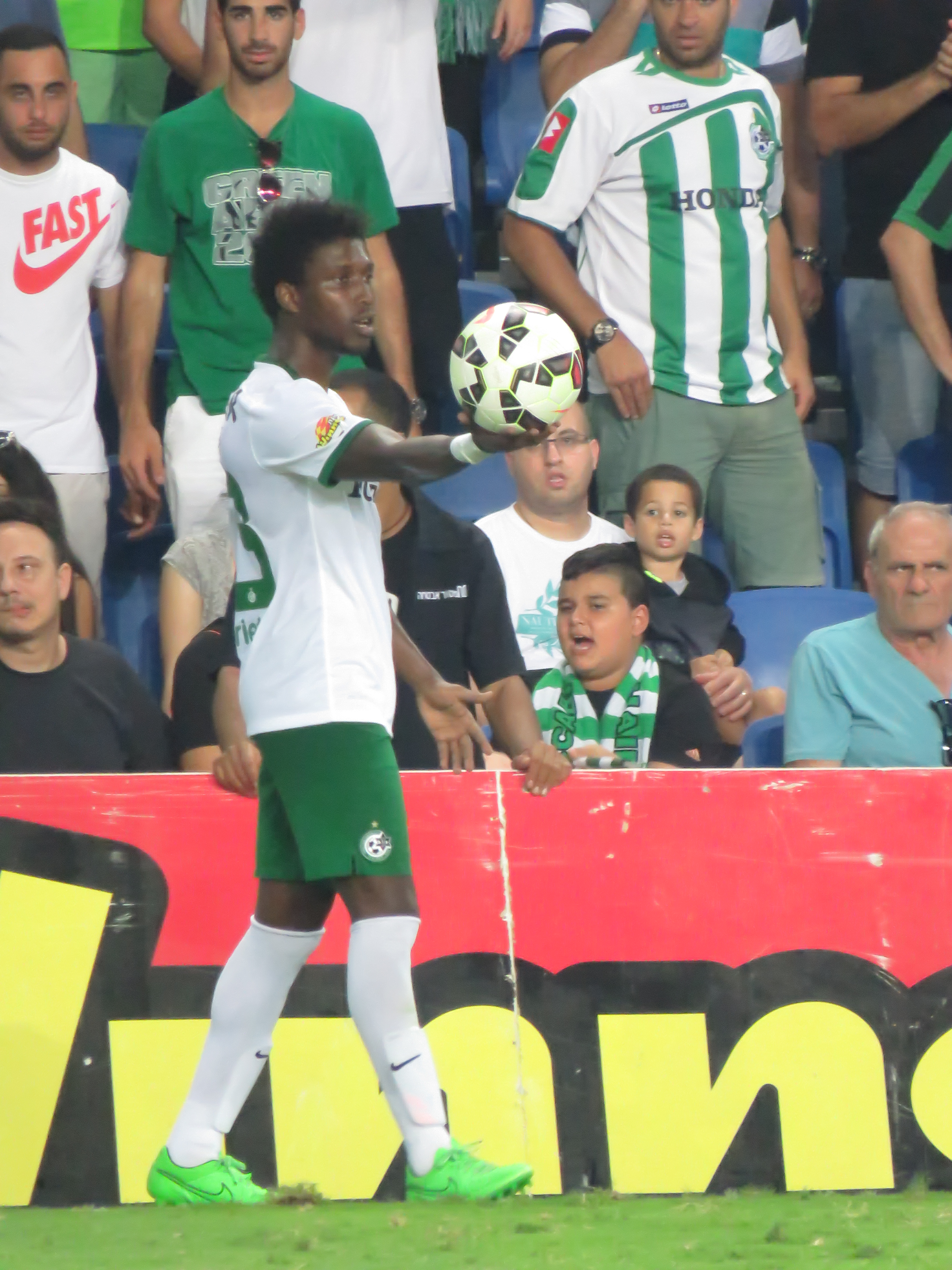
- Tawatha playing for Maccabi Haifa in 2015

Personal information
- Date of birth: 21 June 1992 (age 34)
- Place of birth: Jisr az-Zarqa, Israel
- Height: 1.76 m (5 ft 9 in)
- Position: Left-back

Youth career
- 2003–2010: Maccabi Haifa

Senior career*
Years	Team	Apps	(Gls)
2009–2016	Maccabi Haifa	153	(5)
2016–2019	Eintracht Frankfurt	30	(0)
2019–2020	Ludogorets Razgrad	7	(0)
2020–2022	Maccabi Haifa	18	(0)
2022–2023	Bnei Sakhnin	19	(0)
Total		288	(9)

International career^{‡}
2007–2008	Israel U16	8	(0)
2008–2009	Israel U17	15	(2)
2009	Israel U18	3	(0)
2009–2010	Israel U19	5	(0)
2011–2013	Israel U21	18	(3)
2011–2020	Israel	21	(1)

Managerial career
- 2025–2026: S.C. Kafr Qasim
- * Club domestic league appearances and goals as of 24 February 2026 (UTC) ‡ National team caps and goals as of 15 May 2023

Taleb Tawatha (or Twatha, Arabic: طالب طواطحه, Hebrew: טאלב טוואטחה; born 21 June 1992) is a former Israeli professional footballer who plays as a left-back. He's now a Free Agent

Tawatha started his career at Maccabi Haifa, where he won Israeli Premier League title in 2011 and the Israel State Cup in 2016. He became an integral part of the club's defence, making 204 appearances over the course of seven seasons. In July 2016, Tawatha signed for German club Eintracht Frankfurt of the Bundesliga for a transfer fee of €1.5 million, and was part of the team that won the DFB-Pokal in 2018. In August 2019, he was released and two weeks later signed as a free agent with Bulgarian club Ludogorets Razgrad.

A youth international for Israel from under-16 to under-21 level, Tawatha made his senior debut in 2011.

He also holds a Sudanese citizenship.

== Early life ==
Tawatha was born in Jisr az-Zarqa, Israel, to an Arab-Muslim family of Sudanese and Bedouin descent.

== Career ==
=== Maccabi Haifa ===
Tawatha trained in the youth teams of Maccabi Haifa. In 2009 he made his debut appearance in the senior team. His break-through season was 2010/2011 in which he helped Maccabi Haifa to win the Israeli Premier League championship, scored one goal and assisted five from his position as a left defender. Tawatha won the "Young Discovery Award" and was included in the MVP team of the season. In 2016 he won the Israeli State Cup with Maccabi Haifa.

=== Eintracht Frankfurt ===
In July 2016, Tawatha was signed by German club Eintracht Frankfurt for a transfer fee of 1.5 million Euros. On 19 May 2018, he won the DFB-Pokal with Eintracht Frankfurt after they defeated Bayern Munich 3–1 in the final.

=== Ludogorets Razgrad ===
On 11 September 2019, Tawatha joined Bulgarian First League side Ludogorets Razgrad as a free agent.

=== Maccabi Haifa (Second Stint) ===
On 18 October 2020, Tawatha rejoined Maccabi Haifa for a €100,000 transfer fee. In two seasons with the club, he served as mostly as a reserve, only having 18 total appearances without scoring a goal or an assist.

=== Bnei Sakhnin ===
On 3 July 2022, Tawatha signed with Bnei Sakhnin on a free transfer. Tawatha made 19 total appearances, registering two assists. On 20 November 2024, Tawatha announced his retirement.

== Coaching career ==
=== S.C. Kafr Qasim ===
On 1 July 2025, Tawatha was named an assistant manager for Liga Leumit side S.C. Kafr Qasim. On 13 October, Tawatha was promoted to head coach follow former Head Coach Adham Hadia's move to Maccabi Bnei Reineh F.C.

== Career statistics ==
=== Club ===
As of 1 June 2022

Appearances and goals by club, season and competition
Club	Season	League			National cup (Note: Includes Israel State Cup, DFB-Pokal, Bulgarian Cup.)		Continental		Other		Total	
Club	Season	Division	Apps	Goals	Apps	Goals	Apps	Goals	Apps	Goals	Apps	Goals
Maccabi Haifa	2009–10	Israeli Premier League	3	0	0	0	1	0	7 (Note: Appearances in Toto Cup)	0	11	0
Maccabi Haifa	2010–11	Israeli Premier League	18	1	3	0	0	0	6	0	27	1
Maccabi Haifa	2011–12	Israeli Premier League	28	1	4	0	12	1	3	0	47	2
Maccabi Haifa	2012–13	Israeli Premier League	21	2	2	1	0	0	2	0	25	3
Maccabi Haifa	2013–14	Israeli Premier League	26	0	0	0	11	0	0	0	37	0
Maccabi Haifa	2014–15	Israeli Premier League	30	1	0	0	0	0	0	0	30	1
Maccabi Haifa	2015–16	Israeli Premier League	27	0	4	0	0	0	0	0	27	0
Maccabi Haifa	Total		153	5	9	1	15	1	18	0	204	7
Eintracht Frankfurt	2016–17	Bundesliga	14	0	5	2	0	0	0	0	19	2
Eintracht Frankfurt	2017–18	Bundesliga	13	0	2	0	0	0	0	0	15	0
Eintracht Frankfurt	2018–19	Bundesliga	3	0	0	0	3	0	0	0	6	0
Eintracht Frankfurt	Total		30	0	7	2	3	0	0	0	40	2
Ludogorets Razgrad	2019–20	Bulgarian First Professional League	6	0	1	0	0	0	0	0	7	0
Ludogorets Razgrad	2020–21	Bulgarian First Professional League	1	0	0	0	0	0	1 (Note: Appearance in Bulgarian Supercup)	0	2	0
Ludogorets Razgrad	Total		7	0	1	0	0	0	1	0	9	0
Maccabi Haifa	2020–21	Israeli Premier League	15	0	1	0	0	0	1	0	16	0
Maccabi Haifa	2021–22	Israeli Premier League	3	0	0	0	1	0	3	0	7	0
Maccabi Haifa	Total		18	0	1	0	1	0	4	0	23	0
Bnei Sakhnin	2022–23	Israeli Premier League	0	0	0	0	0	0	0	0	0	0
Career total			208	5	18	3	19	1	23	0	276	9

=== International ===
Scores and results list Israel's goal tally first.

No.	Date	Venue	Opponent	Score	Result	Competition
1.	15 November 2018	Netanya Stadium, Netanya, Israel	Guatemala	2–0	7–0	Friendly

== Honours ==
Maccabi Haifa

- Israeli Premier League: 2010–11, 2020–21, 2021–22
- Israel State Cup: 2015–16
- Toto Cup: 2021–22
- Israel Super Cup: 2021

Eintracht Frankfurt

- DFB-Pokal: 2017–18; runner-up: 2016–17

Ludogorets Razgrad

- Bulgarian First League: 2019–20
