= Roi Mishpati =

Israeli footballer

Personal information
- Date of birth: 23 December 1992 (age 33)
- Place of birth: Rishon LeZion, Israel
- Height: 1.86 m (6 ft 1 in)
- Position: Goalkeeper

Team information
- Current team: Maccabi Tel Aviv
- Number: 90

Youth career
- Hapoel Rishon LeZion

Senior career*
Years	Team	Apps	(Gls)
2010–2011	Hapoel Rishon LeZion	1	(0)
2011–2021	F.C. Ashdod	78	(0)
2017–2018	→ Hapoel Rishon LeZion (loan)	36	(0)
2021–2023	Maccabi Haifa	11	(0)
2023–	Maccabi Tel Aviv	57	(0)
- * Club domestic league appearances and goals as of 23 June 2026

Roi Mishpati (Hebrew: רועי משפטי; born 23 December 1992) is an Israeli footballer who plays as a goalkeeper for Maccabi Tel Aviv.

== Career ==
Mishpati started to play football for Hapoel Rishon LeZion.

In summer 2011, he signed for the Israeli Premier League club F.C. Ashdod as the second goalkeeper for Ofir Marciano. In the 2015–16 season Mishpati became the first goalkeeper after Ashdod was relegated to Liga Leumit in the previous season. In 2017, he was loaned to Hapoel Rishon LeZion.

On 31 August 2021, he signed for two seasons for Maccabi Haifa.

On May 30, 2023, he signed a two-year contract with Maccabi Tel Aviv. In the Toto Cup final against Maccabi Haifa, which was decided by a penalty shootout, he saved two penalty kicks, leading to a 4–2 victory and securing the title. He started the 2023/2024 season as the first-choice goalkeeper but later lost his spot to Orlando Mosquera, who was signed by the club. In January, he returned to the starting lineup and contributed to winning the championship.

== Career statistics ==
As of match played on 22 January 2026

Appearances and goals by club, season and competition
Club	Season	League			National cup		League cup		Europe		Other		Total	
Club	Season	Division	Apps	Goals	Apps	Goals	Apps	Goals	Apps	Goals	Apps	Goals	Apps	Goals
Hapoel Rishon LeZion	2010–11	Liga Leumit	1	0	0	0	0	0	—		—		1	0
F.C. Ashdod	2011–12	Israeli Premier League	4	0	1	0	0	0	—		—		5	0
F.C. Ashdod	2012–13	Israeli Premier League	1	0	0	0	1	0	—		—		2	0
F.C. Ashdod	2013–14	Israeli Premier League	5	0	1	0	—		—		—		6	0
F.C. Ashdod	2014–15	Israeli Premier League	0	0	0	0	1	0	—		—		1	0
F.C. Ashdod	2015–16	Liga Leumit	21	0	2	0	—		—		—		23	0
F.C. Ashdod	2016–17	Israeli Premier League	2	0	0	0	6	0	—		—		8	0
F.C. Ashdod	2018–19	Israeli Premier League	5	0	1	0	1	0	—		—		7	0
F.C. Ashdod	2019–20	Israeli Premier League	30	0	0	0	4	0	—		—		34	0
F.C. Ashdod	2020–21	Israeli Premier League	10	0	0	0	4	0	—		—		14	0
F.C. Ashdod	2021–22	Israeli Premier League	0	0	—		0	0	0	0	—		0	0
F.C. Ashdod	Total		78	0	5	0	17	0	0	0	—		100	0
Hapoel Rishon LeZion (loan)	2017–18	Liga Leumit	36	0	1	0	—		—		—		37	0
Maccabi Haifa	2021–22	Israeli Premier League	2	0	5	0	1	0	1	0	—		9	0
Maccabi Haifa	2022–23	Israeli Premier League	9	0	4	0	1	0	0	0	0	0	14	0
Maccabi Haifa	Total		11	0	9	0	2	0	1	0	0	0	23	0
Maccabi Tel Aviv	2023–24	Israeli Premier League	27	0	1	0	1	0	5	0	—		34	0
Maccabi Tel Aviv	2024–25	Israeli Premier League	19	0	0	0	1	0	13	0	1	0	34	0
Maccabi Tel Aviv	2025–26	Israeli Premier League	10	0	0	0	0	0	12	0	1	0	23	0
Maccabi Tel Aviv	Total		56	0	1	0	2	0	30	0	2	0	91	0
Career total			182	0	16	0	21	0	31	0	2	0	252	0
