= Sean Goldberg =

Israeli footballer (born 1995)

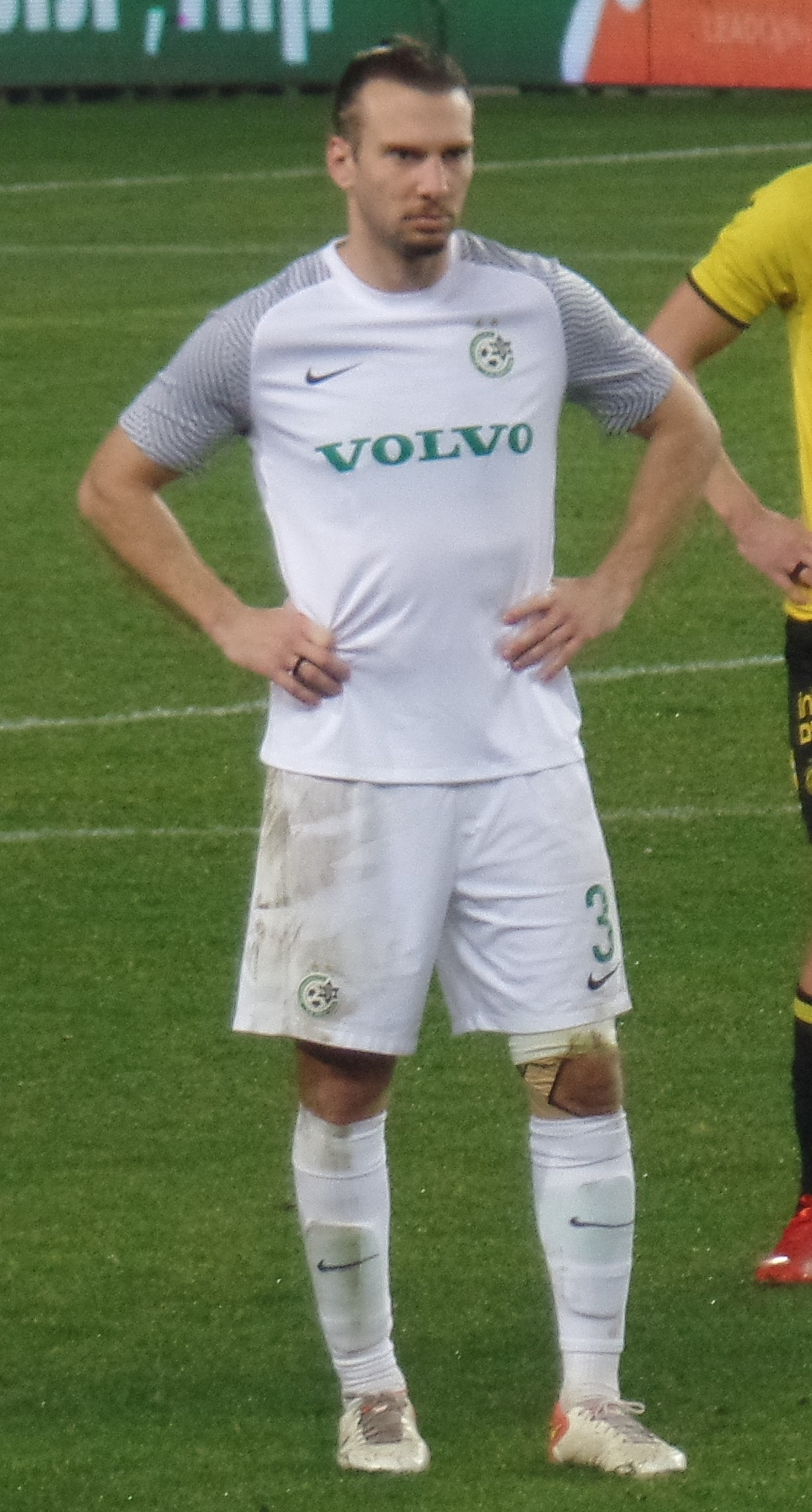
- Goldberg playing for Maccabi Haifa in 2022

Personal information
- Full name: Sean Goldberg
- Date of birth: 13 June 1995 (age 31)
- Place of birth: Tel Aviv, Israel
- Height: 1.79 m (5 ft 10 in)
- Positions: Center-back; left-back

Team information
- Current team: Maccabi Haifa
- Number: 3

Youth career
- 2004–2014: Maccabi Tel Aviv

Senior career*
Years	Team	Apps	(Gls)
2014–2018	Maccabi Tel Aviv	1	(0)
2015	→ Hapoel Tel Aviv (loan)	9	(0)
2015–2017	→ Bnei Yehuda Tel Aviv (loan)	52	(0)
2017–2018	→ Beitar Jerusalem (loan)	25	(0)
2018–2019	Hapoel Haifa	26	(0)
2019–2021	Hapoel Be'er Sheva	40	(0)
2021–	Maccabi Haifa	128	(4)

International career^{‡}
2010–2011	Israel U16	7	(0)
2011–2011	Israel U17	8	(0)
2012–2013	Israel U18	7	(0)
2013–2014	Israel U19	12	(0)
2015–2017	Israel U21	8	(0)
2022–	Israel	19	(0)
- * Club domestic league appearances and goals as of 23 June 2026 ‡ National team caps and goals as of 25 March 2025

Sean Goldberg (or Shon, Hebrew: שון גולדברג; born 13 June 1995) is an Israeli footballer who plays as a center-back or as a left-back for Israeli Premier League club Maccabi Haifa and the Israel national team.

== Early life ==
Goldberg was born in Tel Aviv, Israel, to a family of Ashkenazi Jewish and of Italian-Jewish descent.

He also holds an Italian passport, on account of his Italian-Jewish ancestry, which eases the move to certain European football leagues.

He has graduated from the Reichman University (formerly the IDC Herzliya college) in Herzliya, Israel, in May 2022, majoring in business administration.

== Club career ==
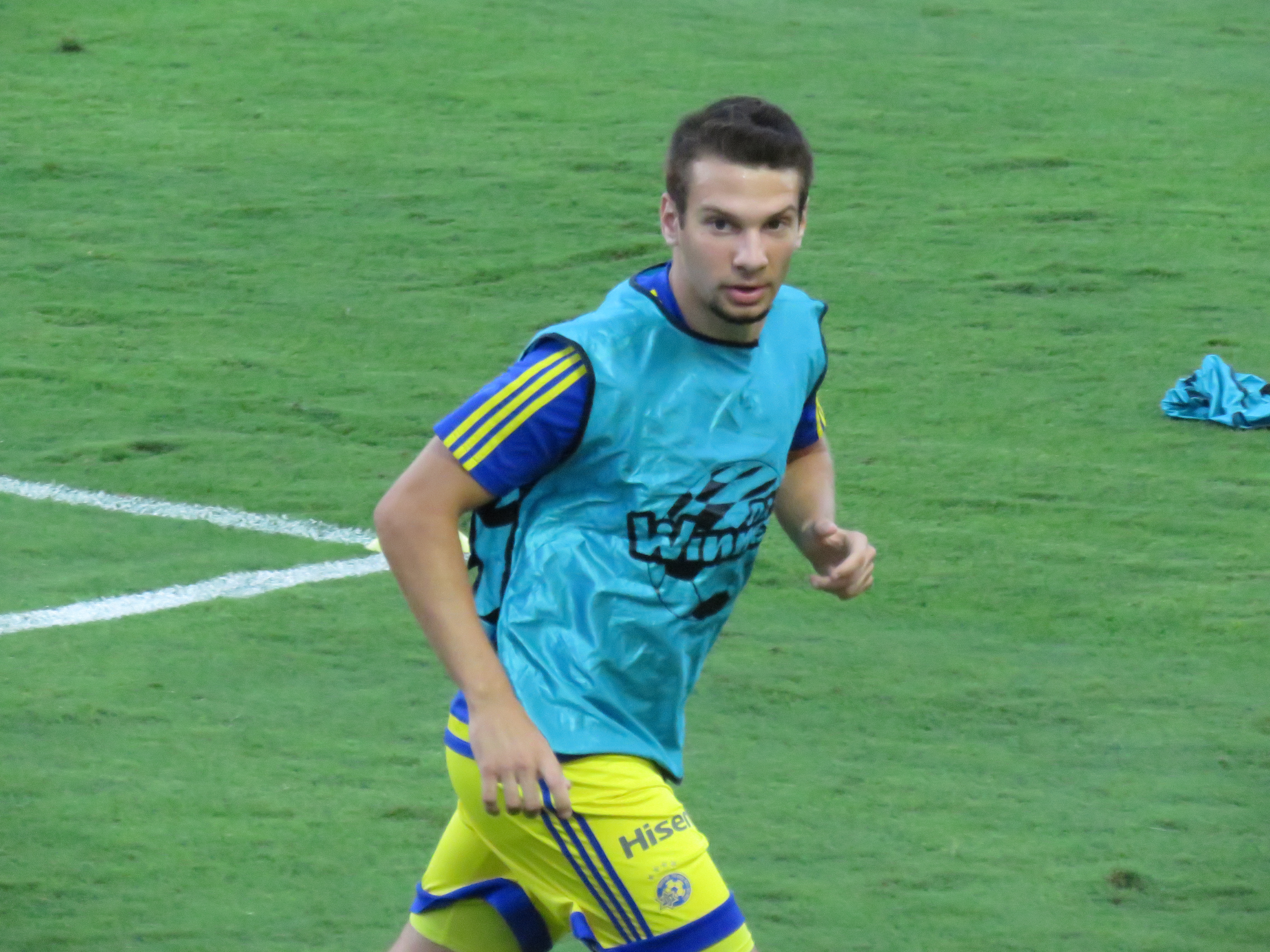
Goldberg with Maccabi Tel Aviv in 2015

Born in 1995, Goldberg started his football career with Israeli side Maccabi Tel Aviv youth team. On 1 July 2014, he was called up for Maccabi Tel Aviv football team. On 26 October 2014, Goldberg made his senior Israeli Premier League debut against Hapoel Acre, coming on as a substitute for Sheran Yeini at the 75th minute. Goldberg won the 2014–15 Toto Cup Al with Maccabi Tel Aviv.

On February 3, 2015, Goldberg was loaned together with Ben Reichert to Hapoel Tel Aviv, as part of a deal in which Gili Vermouth was signed by Maccabi. On February 14, 2015, Goldberg made his debut for the club, coming in as a substitute in a 0–1 loss to Hapoel Be'er Sheva. He made nine appearances for the club in that season.

On September 1, 2015, Goldberg moved to Bnei Yehuda Tel Aviv on loan until the end of 2016-17 season. In May 2017 he won the Israel State Cup with Bnei Yehuda Tel Aviv, after beating Maccabi Tel Aviv in the final.

On September 4, 2017, he joined Beitar Jerusalem on loan for one season. A week later he made his debut for the club after coming in as a substitute in 2–1 victory over Maccabi Petah Tikva. Goldberg and Beitar finished the 2017–2018 season as the Israel State Cup runners-up after losing 1–3 to Hapoel Haifa in the final.

In the start of the 2018–19 season, Goldberg made a single appearance for Maccabi Tel Aviv in the 2014–15 Toto Cup Al. On August 14, 2019, he was released from Maccabi Tel Aviv and signed with Hapoel Haifa for one season.

On June 11, 2019, Goldberg signed with Hapoel Be'er Sheva. He made his debut for the club in the starting roster in a 1–1 draw against KF Laçi in the 2019–20 Europa League qualifiers, and assisted the goal which his team scored. In 2020 Goldberg extended his contract with the club for another season. On September 18 made the assist for his team's winning goal in a 2–1 victory against KF Laçi in the 2020–21 Europa League qualifiers, helping his team qualify to the next round.

On June 10, 2021, Goldberg signed with Maccabi Haifa for 2 seasons. He made his debut for the club in a 0–2 loss to FC Kairat in the 2021–22 UEFA Champions League qualifiers. On August 29 he made his league debut for the club in a 0–0 draw against Hapoel Hadera. At the end of the 2021–22 season he won the league championship and finished as runners-up in the Israel State Cup with Maccabi Haifa after losing to Hapoel Be'er Sheva in the final.

== International career ==
Goldberg was internationally capped for his native Israel at all the various youth teams: under-16, under-17, under-18, under-19, and the under-21.

On 17 March 2022, Goldberg was first called up to the Israel senior team, ahead of the friendly matches against Germany and Romania. On March 26, he made his senior debut for the Israel, opening in the 0–2 friendly away loss against Germany.

Goldberg was selected as one of three overage players in Israel's squad to compete in the men's football tournament at the 2024 Summer Olympics.He was named the team's captain.

== Career statistics ==
=== Club ===
As of match played 1 June 2023

Appearances and goals by club, season and competition
Club performance			League		Cup		League Cup		Continental		Other		Total	
Season	Club	League	Apps	Goals	Apps	Goals	Apps	Goals	Apps	Goals	Apps	Goals	Apps	Goals
Israel			League		Israel State Cup		Toto Cup		Europe		Israel Super Cup		Total	
2014–15	Maccabi Tel Aviv	Israeli Premier League	1	0	2	0	3	0	0	0	0	0	6	0
2014–15	Hapoel Tel Aviv	Israeli Premier League	9	0	0	0	0	0	0	0	0	0	9	0
2015–16	Maccabi Tel Aviv	Israeli Premier League	0	0	0	0	2	0	0	0	0	0	2	0
2015–16	Bnei Yehuda Tel Aviv	Israeli Premier League	20	0	3	0	2	0	—		0	0	25	0
2016–17	Bnei Yehuda Tel Aviv	Israeli Premier League	32	0	6	0	6	0	—		0	0	44	0
2017–18	Maccabi Tel Aviv	Israeli Premier League	0	0	0	0	1	0	0	0	0	0	1	0
2017–18	Beitar Jerusalem	Israeli Premier League	25	0	5	0	1	0	0	0	0	0	31	0
2018–19	Hapoel Haifa	Israeli Premier League	26	0	0	0	1	0	0	0	0	0	27	0
2019–20	Hapoel Be'er Sheva	Israeli Premier League	15	0	4	0	0	0	8	0	0	0	27	0
2020–21	Hapoel Be'er Sheva	Israeli Premier League	25	0	1	0	1	0	8	0	2	0	37	0
2021–22	Maccabi Haifa	Israeli Premier League	31	0	4	0	2	0	7	0	1	0	45	0
2022–23	Maccabi Haifa	Israeli Premier League	28	1	2	0	0	0	12	0	1	0	43	1
2023–24	Maccabi Haifa	Israeli Premier League	0	0	0	0	0	0	0	0	0	0	0	0
Career total			212	1	27	0	19	0	35	0	4	0	297	1

== Honours ==
Maccabi Tel Aviv

- Israeli Premier League: 2014–15
- Israel Toto Cup (Ligat Ha'Al): 2014–15

Bnei Yehuda Tel Aviv

- Israel State Cup: 2016–17

Maccabi Haifa

- Israeli Premier League: 2021–22, 2022-23
- Israel Toto Cup (Ligat Ha'Al): 2021–22
- Israel Super Cup: 2021, 2023

== See also ==
- List of Jewish footballers
- List of Jews in sports
- List of Israelis
