= Maor Levi =

Israeli footballer (born 2000)

Personal information
- Date of birth: 18 June 2000 (age 26)
- Place of birth: Yokneam Illit, Israel
- Position: Midfielder

Team information
- Current team: Maccabi Netanya
- Number: 15

Youth career
- Maccabi Haifa

Senior career*
Years	Team	Apps	(Gls)
2020–2024	Maccabi Haifa	46	(3)
2023–2024	→ Maccabi Petah Tikva	41	(6)
2024–	Maccabi Netanya	63	(10)

International career
2017	Israel U17	3	(0)
2019	Israel U19	2	(0)
2021–2022	Israel U21	8	(0)
- * Club domestic league appearances and goals as of 24 June 2026

Maor Levi (Hebrew: מאור לוי; born 18 June 2000) is an Israeli professional footballer who plays as a midfielder for Maccabi Netanya.

== Early life ==
Levi was born in Yokneam Illit, Israel, to a family of Jewish descent.

== Honours ==
Maccabi Haifa

- Israeli Premier League: 2020–21, 2021–22
- Toto Cup: 2021–22
- Israel Super Cup: 2021
