= Josh Cohen (soccer) =

American soccer player (born 1992)

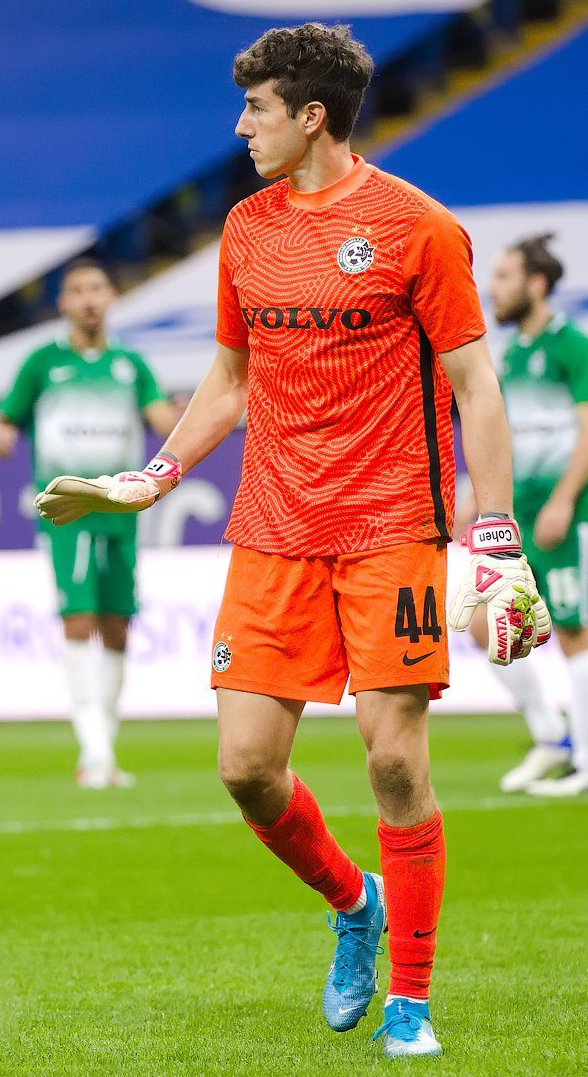
- Cohen with Maccabi Haifa in 2020

Personal information
- Full name: Joshua Cohen
- Date of birth: August 18, 1992 (age 34)
- Place of birth: Mountain View, California, United States
- Height: 6 ft 1 1/4 in (1.86 m)
- Position: Goalkeeper

Team information
- Current team: Chicago Fire
- Number: 44

Youth career
- 2004–2007: Santa Clara Sporting Club
- 2007: Grêmio
- 2007–2010: Santa Clara Sporting Club

College career
Years	Team	Apps	(Gls)
2010–2013	UC San Diego Tritons	52	(0)

Senior career*
Years	Team	Apps	(Gls)
2015	Burlingame Dragons	11	(0)
2015–2016	Orange County Blues	16	(0)
2017	Phoenix Rising	28	(0)
2018–2019	Sacramento Republic	51	(0)
2019–2023	Maccabi Haifa	123	(0)
2024–2025	Atlanta United	3	(0)
2024–2025	Atlanta United 2	7	(0)
2026–	Chicago Fire	2	(0)
2026–	Chicago Fire II	1	(0)
- * Club domestic league appearances and goals as of November 12, 2026

Joshua Cohen (Hebrew: יהושע "ג'וש" כהן; born August 8, 1992) is an American professional soccer player who plays as a goalkeeper for Chicago Fire in Major League Soccer

== Early and personal life ==
Cohen was born in Mountain View, California, United States, to a family of Jewish descent.

On December 12, 2019, he obtained his Israeli temporary resident status. On February 20, 2021, Cohen acquired Israeli citizenship, with an Oleh Hadash status, on account of the State of Israel's Law of Return for the Jewish diaspora.

== Career ==
Cohen played four years of college soccer at the University of California, San Diego between 2010 and 2013, graduating with a degree in bioengineering and computer science. He appeared in 51 games in his collegiate career. In 2012, he started 12 games and led the entirety of NCAA Division II in goals against average (0.397) and save percentage (0.898), earning a place on the Daktronics All-America Second Team. In 2013, he started 22 games and earned NSCAA All-America First Team honors.

In early 2014, Cohen was invited by the Philadelphia Union to a one-week trial from January 25 through February 1.

=== Burlingame Dragons ===
After college, Cohen appeared for USL PDL side Burlingame Dragons in 2015, making 11 appearances with a goals against average of 0.636.

=== Orange County ===
Cohen signed with United Soccer League club Orange County Blues on August 10, 2015, where he started one game in the 2015 season. He returned to the team for the 2016 season.

=== Phoenix Rising ===
Cohen spent the 2017 season with Phoenix Rising where he won the starting goalkeeper role, making 28 starts on the season. He earned the September 2017 Player of the Month Award with a 0.37 GAA and 88.9% save percentage over the course of the month.

=== Sacramento Republic ===
Cohen signed with Sacramento Republic FC of the USL Championship on January 16, 2018, with a club option for 2019. He played every minute of the 2018 USL Championship season, conceding 32 goals in the 34 games of the regular season, and earning twelve clean sheets. Cohen was named a finalist for USL Goalkeeper of the Year and was selected to the USL All-League Second Team.

He returned to Sacramento for the start of the 2019 season and made 16 appearances, allowing just 17 goals, before his transfer.

=== Maccabi Haifa ===
==== 2019–20: Debut season and runner-up ====
On July 19, 2019, Sacramento Republic and Maccabi Haifa agreed to a transfer of Cohen to the Israeli Premier League club in advance of their 2019–20 season. Cohen made his first start on September 25, 2019, where he was in net for a 3–0 victory over Maccabi Netanya. He returned to the starting line-up on October 26, 2019, for another 3–0 victory, this time over Hapoel Kfar Saba. He then started every game until the season's eventual postponement. In that time, he conceded only 15 goals in his 21 games, saw out 12 clean sheets, and helped lead Maccabi Haifa to a second-place finish at the end of the first stage of the regular season.

Cohen was named the Israeli Premier League's Player of the Season in 2020–21, leading Maccabi Haifa to their first league championship since their last one in 2010–11.

In the 2021–22 season, Cohen led the club to repeat as Israeli Premier League Champions, finishing the season with the best defensive record in the league and earning 16 clean sheets across the campaign. This earned Maccabi Haifa a 2022-23 UEFA Champions League playoff round berth, where they would go on to defeat Olympiacos, Apollon Limassol, and Red Star Belgrade. In the ensuing UCL group stage, Cohen's five saves led Haifa to a 2–0 clean sheet win over Juventus.

In May 2023, Cohen and Haifa clinched their third consecutive Israeli Premier League title with a 5–1 win over Maccabi Netanya.

=== Atlanta United ===
On December 14, 2023, Cohen signed with Major League Soccer club Atlanta United as a free-agent through the 2025 season with a club option for 2026. On May 21, 2024 Cohen made his first appearance for the first team, having a clean sheet versus Charlotte Independence and Charleston Battery in the Lamar Hunt U S Open Cup. Cohen also saved two consecutive penalty kicks against Charleston Battery to advance Atlanta to the quarter finals of the U.S. Open Cup. Cohen made his first official MLS regular-season start on May 29, 2024, recording four saves in a victory over Inter Miami CF.

=== Chicago Fire ===
On December 31, 2025, Chicago Fire FC acquired Cohen as a free-agent. The club announced that he is under contract through June 2027 with a club option for the 2027-28 season.

== Honors ==
Maccabi Haifa

- Israeli Premier League: 2020–21, 2021–22, 2022–23
- Israel Toto Cup (Ligat Ha'Al): 2021–22
- Israel Super Cup: 2021

Individual

- Israeli Footballer of the Year: 2020–21

== See also ==
- List of Jewish footballers
- List of Jews in sports
- List of Israelis
