= Rami Gershon =

Israeli footballer (born 1988)

Rami Gershon רמי גרשון
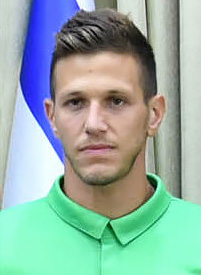
- Gershon in 2018

Personal information
- Full name: Rami Gershon
- Date of birth: 12 August 1988 (age 38)
- Place of birth: Rishon LeZion, Israel
- Height: 1.89 m (6 ft 2 1/2 in)
- Positions: Centre back; left-back

Youth career
- 1996–2008: Hapoel Rishon Lezion

Senior career*
Years	Team	Apps	(Gls)
2008–2010	Hapoel Rishon Lezion	36	(1)
2009–2010	→ Standard Liège (loan)	2	(0)
2010–2013	Standard Liège	19	(0)
2010–2012	→ Kortrijk (loan)	46	(1)
2013	→ Celtic (loan)	3	(1)
2013–2014	Waasland-Beveren	18	(1)
2014–2017	Gent	101	(1)
2017–2025	Maccabi Haifa	125	(2)
Total		350	(7)

International career
2008–2010	Israel U21	11	(0)
2010–2019	Israel	26	(2)
- * Club domestic league appearances and goals as of 15 April 2024

Rami Gershon (Hebrew: רמי גרשון; born 12 August 1988) is an Israeli former footballer who played as a centre-back or as a left-back for Maccabi Haifa and the Israel national team.

== Early life ==
Gershon was born in Rishon LeZion, Israel, to a family of Greek-Jewish and Iraqi-Jewish descent. He got a bachelor's degree in education and society and a master's degree in business administration from Ono Academic College.

== Club career ==
Gershon began his career with Hapoel Rishon Lezion and joined on 6 July 2009 on trial to Standard Liège of the Jupiler League. After finishing the trial Liege loaned Gershon for one season with an option to buy him at the end which they eventually did at the summer of 2010 and immediately loaned him to K.V. Kortrijk for one season.

=== Celtic ===
On 9 January 2013, Celtic's Chief Executive, Peter Lawwell announced that Gershon had signed a loan deal until the end of the season. On 9 February 2013, Gershon made his Celtic début away to Inverness CT in the Scottish Premier League, managing to score and put Celtic into a 1–2 lead, the match ended 1–3.

=== K.A.A. Gent ===
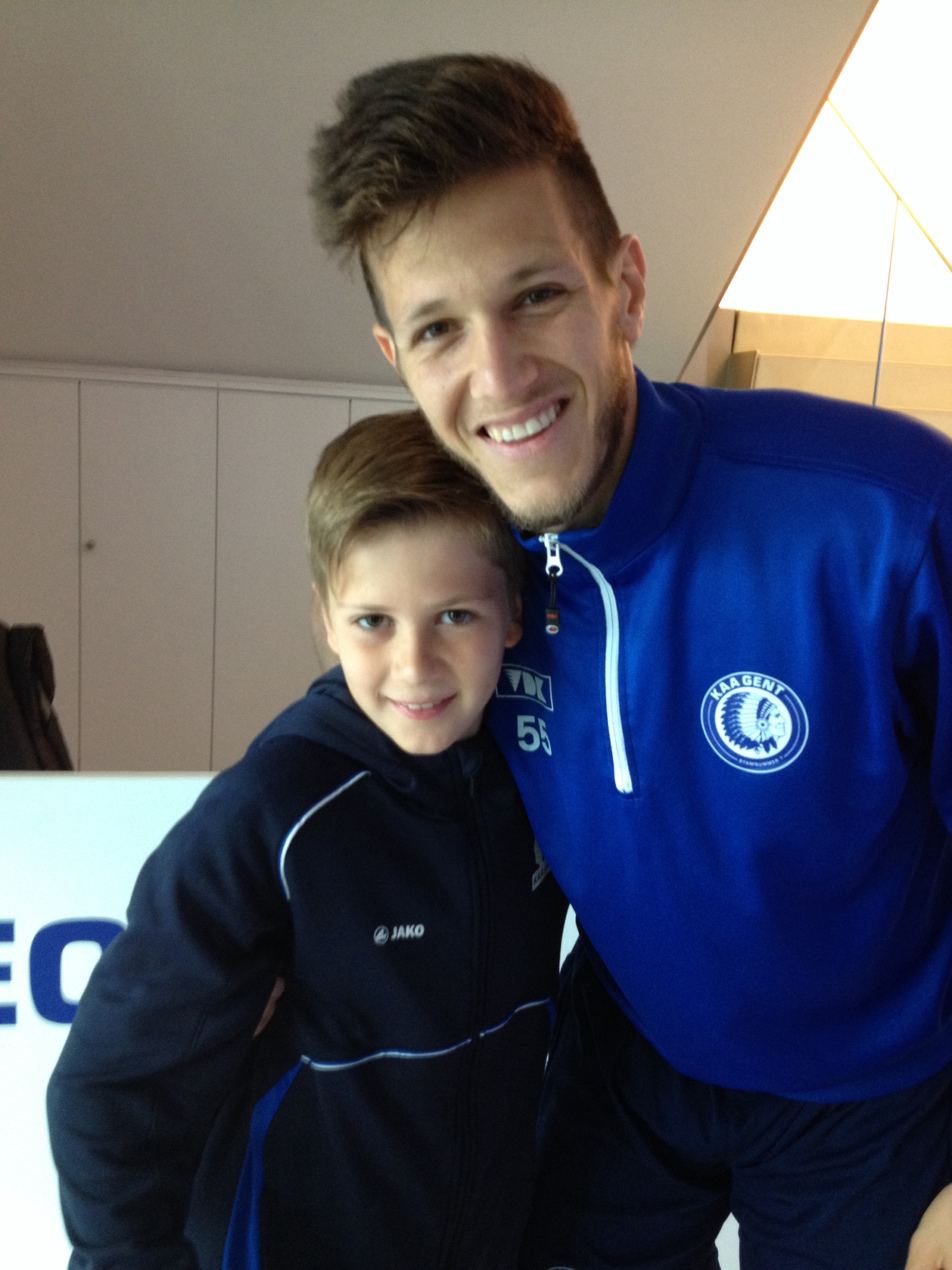
Gershon (right) as a Gent player with a fan in 2015

In 2014, the Belgian team Gent transferred Gershon to Belgium. He was quite quickly one of the players in the basic team, and he was a mainstay in the 2015-Championship-team and a year later in the Champions League-campaign.

== International career ==
Gershon has won 10 caps for the Israel U21 and 21 caps for Israel. On 12 October 2010 Gershon made his debut for Israel in the 1–2 loss to Greece, in a Euro 2012 Qualifier. On 11 October 2011, Gershon scored his first goal for the national team in Israel's 2–0 away win over Malta, also in the Euro 2012 qualifiers. On 22 March 2013, Gershon scored against Portugal in Ramat Gan Stadium in the 3–3 draw.

== Personal life ==
Gershon is married to model Neta Alchimister since June 2019, and they have a child.

== Career statistics ==
=== International ===
Scores and results list Israel's goal tally first

Goal	Date	Venue	Opponent	Score	Result	Competition
1	11 October 2011	Ta'Qali Stadium, Ta' Qali	Malta	2–0	2–0	UEFA Euro 2012 qualifying
2	22 March 2013	Ramat Gan Stadium, Ramat Gan	Portugal	3–1	3–3	2014 FIFA World Cup qualification

== Honours ==
Celtic

- Scottish Premier League: 2012–13

Gent

- Belgian Pro League: 2014–15

Maccabi Haifa

- Israeli Premier League: 2020–21, 2021–22, 2022–23
- Toto Cup: 2021–22
- Israel Super Cup: 2021, 2023

Sporting positions
Preceded by Dekel Keinan	Maccabi Haifa F.C. captain 2018–2019	Succeeded by Neta Lavi
