= Raz Meir =

Israeli association footballer

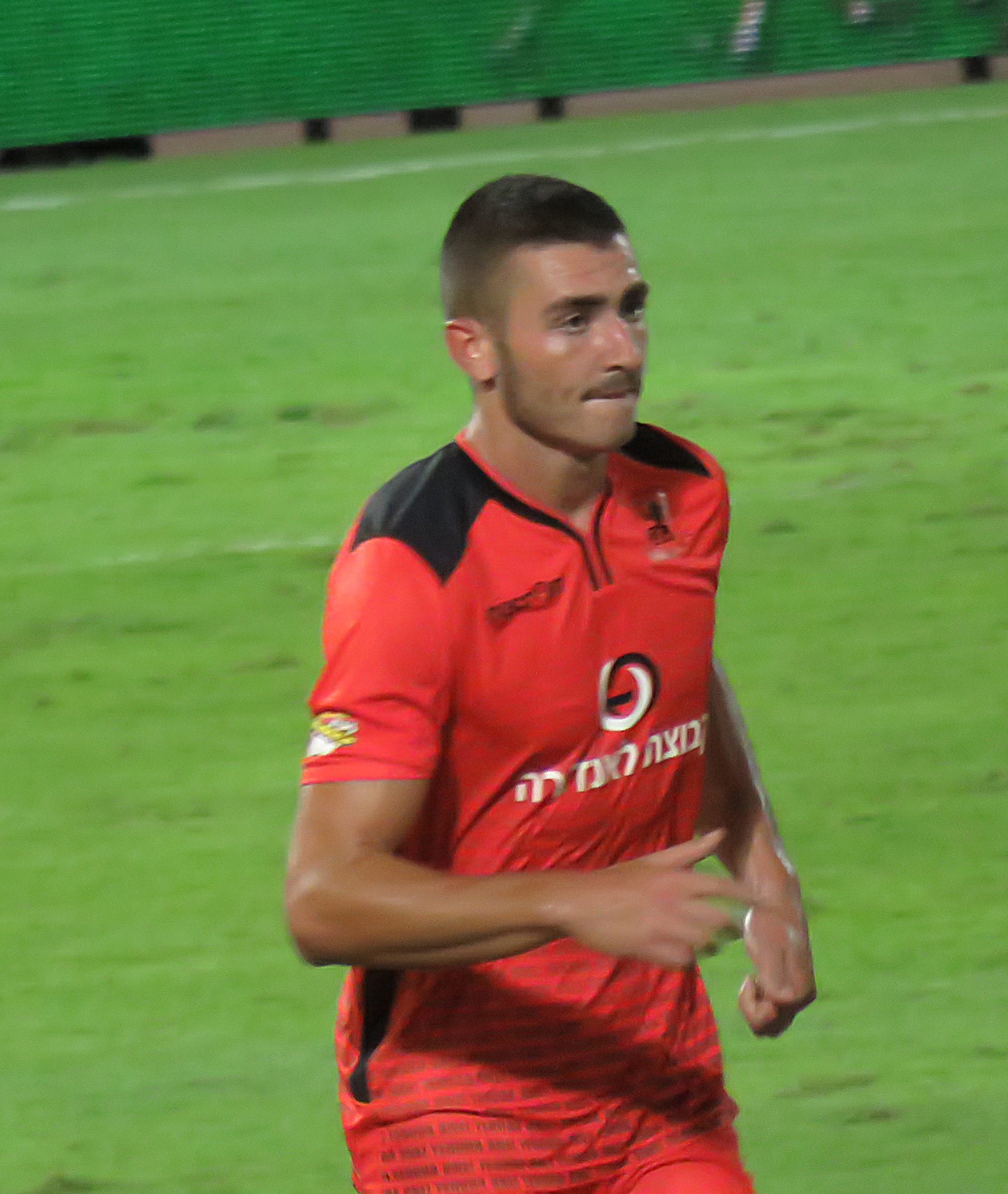
- Meir playing for Bnei Yehuda Tel Aviv in 2015

Personal information
- Date of birth: 30 November 1996 (age 29)
- Place of birth: Rishon LeZion, Israel
- Height: 1.80 m (5 ft 11 in)
- Position: Right-back

Team information
- Current team: Ashdod
- Number: 2

Youth career
- 2006–2014: Hapoel Rishon LeZion
- 2014–2015: Maccabi Haifa

Senior career*
Years	Team	Apps	(Gls)
2013–2014	Hapoel Rishon LeZion	4	(0)
2014–2023	Maccabi Haifa	147	(3)
2015–2016	→ Bnei Yehuda Tel Aviv (loan)	21	(0)
2016–2017	→ Hapoel Ashkelon (loan)	26	(1)
2023–2024	RKC Waalwijk	4	(0)
2024	Hapoel Tel Aviv	13	(0)
2024–2025	Maccabi Netanya	10	(0)
2025–2026	F.C. Ashdod	5	(0)

International career
2012–2013	Israel U17	6	(0)
2013	Israel U18	5	(2)
2014	Israel U19	8	(0)
2017–2018	Israel U21	14	(1)
- * Club domestic league appearances and goals as of 1 June 2026

Yosef Raz Meir (Hebrew: יוסף רז מאיר; born 30 November 1996) is an Israeli professional footballer who plays as right-back for Ashdod F.C.

== Early life ==
Meir was born in Rishon LeZion, Israel, to a Jewish family.

== Club career ==
He made his Israeli Premier League debut for Maccabi Haifa on 17 May 2014 in a game against Hapoel Be'er Sheva.

On 19 January 2024, Meir signed a 1.5-year contract with Hapoel Tel Aviv.

== International career ==
Meir has been a youth national for Israel since 2012, playing for the U-17 team all the way to the U-21 team.

== Honours ==
=== Club ===
Maccabi Haifa

- Israeli Premier League: 2020–21, 2021–22, 2022–23
- Toto Cup: 2021–22
- Israel Super Cup: 2021
