= 2021 Israel Super Cup =

Maccabi Haifa	Maccabi Tel Aviv
2	0
- Date: 25 July 2021
- Venue: Sammy Ofer Stadium, Haifa
- Referee: Liran Liany
- Attendance: 19,798

The 2021 Israel Super Cup is the 26th edition of the Israel Super Cup (31st, including unofficial matches (Note: The competition wasn't played within the Israel Football Association for its first 5 editions, until 1969.)), an annual Israel football match played between the winners of the previous season's Top Division and the Israel State Cup. This will be the seventh edition since the Super cup's resumption in 2015.

The game will be played on 25 July 2021 between the 2020–21 Israeli Premier League champions, Maccabi Haifa, and the 2020–21 Israel State Cup winners, Maccabi Tel Aviv.

== Match details ==
25 July 2021
20:30

Maccabi Haifa	2–0	Maccabi Tel Aviv
Atzili (yellow card) 1'; Sahar 50'; Meir (yellow card) 68'; Cohen (yellow card) 70'; Abu Fani 72', (yellow card) 90+2'; Maor Levi (yellow card) 90+1'	Report	(yellow card) 14' Glazer; (yellow card) 37' Nachmias

Sammy Ofer Stadium, Haifa
Attendance: 19,798
Referee: Liran Liany

Maccabi Haifa	Maccabi Tel Aviv

GK	44	(Israel) Josh Cohen (yellow card) 70'
RB	25	(Israel) Raz Meir (yellow card) 68'
CB	5	(Serbia) Bogdan Planic (substituted off) 81'
CB	24	(Israel) Uri Dahan (substituted off) 61'
LB	12	(Israel) Sun Menahem
CM	4	(Niger) Ali Mohamed
LM	16	(Israel) Mohammad Abu Fani (yellow card) 90+2'
RM	10	(Suriname) Tjaronn Chery (c)
RM	21	(Israel) Dean David (substituted off) 72'
LW	7	(Israel) Omer Atzili (yellow card) 1' (substituted off) 81'
FW	9	(Israel) Ben Sahar (substituted off) 60'
Substitutes:
GK	52	(Israel) Itamar Israeli
DF	35	(Israel) Rony Laufer
DF	3	(Israel) Sean Goldberg (substituted in) 81'
DF	26	(Israel) Mahmmoud Jaber
DF	55	(Israel) Rami Gershon (substituted in) 61'
MF	14	(Spain) José Rodriguez (substituted in) 72'
MF	18	(Israel) Yuval Ashkenazi
MF	33	(Israel) Maor Levi (substituted in) 81' (yellow card) 89'
FW	11	(Ghana) Godsway Donyoh (substituted in) 60'
Manager:
(Israel) Barak Bakhar

GK	1	(Israel) Daniel Peretz
RB	26	(Portugal) André Geraldes
CB	44	(Spain) Luis Hernández
CB	5	(Israel) Idan Nachmias (yellow card) 37' (substituted off) 72'
LB	4	(Spain) Enric Saborit (substituted off) 65' (yellow card) 48'
DM	6	(Israel) Dan Glazer (c) (yellow card) 15'
CM	31	(Israel) Shahar Piven (substituted off) 58'
LM	22	(Israel) Avi Rikan (substituted off) 60'
RW	39	(Panama) Eduardo Guerrero (substituted off) 60'
CF	20	(Israel) Osama Khalaila (substituted off) 72'
LF	24	(Israel) Yonatan Cohen
Substitutes:
GK	17	(Greece) Andreas Gianniotis
DF	3	(Israel) Matan Baltaxa
DF	27	(Israel) Ofir Davidzada (substituted in) 65'
DF	30	(Israel) Maor Kandil
MF	36	(Israel) Ido Shachar (substituted in) 60'
MF	47	(Israel) Eden Karzev
FW	7	(Israel) Matan Hozez (substituted in) 60'
FW	11	(Israel) Tal Ben Haim (substituted in) 72'
FW	29	(Israel) Eylon Almog (substituted in) 72'
Manager:
(Netherlands) Patrick van Leeuwen

Man of the Match:

MATCH OFFICIALS
Assistant referees:
Dudu Biton
Yossi Bsbayof
Fourth official:
Aviad Shiloach
Video assistant referee:

Assistant video assistant referee:

Match rules

- 90 minutes.
- Ten named substitutes, of which up to five may be used.
