= 2021–22 Toto Cup Al =

Tournament details
- Country: Israel
- Teams: 14

Final positions
- Champions: Maccabi Haifa (5th title)
- Runners-up: Hapoel Be'er Sheva
- Semifinalists: Hapoel Haifa; Hapoel Tel Aviv

Tournament statistics
- Matches played: 29
- Goals scored: 64 (2.21 per match)
- All statistics correct as of 23 September 2021.

The 2021–22 Toto Cup Al is the 37th season of the third-important football tournament in Israel since its introduction and the 16th tournament involving Israeli Premier League clubs only.

Maccabi Tel Aviv are the defending champions.

== Format changes ==
The four clubs playing in the UEFA competitions (Maccabi Haifa, Maccabi Tel Aviv, F.C. Ashdod and Hapoel Be'er Sheva) will not take part in the group stage, while the remaining ten clubs were divided into two groups of five, at the end of the group stage each of the group winners will qualify to the semi-finals. Maccabi Haifa and Maccabi Tel Aviv will play in the 2021 Israel Super Cup match for a place in one of the semi-finals (meeting the group winner with the least points accumulated), while F.C. Ashdod and Hapoel Be'er Sheva will play for a place in the other semi-final (meeting the group winner with the most points accumulated) . All clubs will participate in classification play-offs to determine their final positions.

== Group stage ==
Groups were allocated according to geographic distribution of the clubs, with the northern clubs allocated to Group A, and the southern clubs allocated to Group B. Each club will play the other clubs once.

The matches were scheduled to start on 31 July 2021.

=== Group A ===
Pos	Team	Pld	W	D	L	GF	GA	GD	Pts	Qualification	HHA	BnS	HHD	IKS	HNG
1	Hapoel Haifa (Q)	4	3	1	0	7	4	+3	10	Semi-finals	—		1–1	1–0	3–2
2	Bnei Sakhnin	4	2	0	2	8	8	0	6	5-8th classification play-offs	2–3	—		2–3	
3	Hapoel Hadera	4	1	2	1	5	5	0	5	9-10th classification play-offs		1–2	—		
4	Ironi Kiryat Shmona	4	1	2	1	4	4	0	5	11-12th classification play-offs			0–0	—	1–1
5	Hapoel Nof HaGalil	4	0	1	3	5	8	−3	1	13-14th classification play-offs	1–2	1–2			—

Updated to match(es) played on unknown. Source: Israel Football Association
Rules for classification: 1) points; 2) goal difference; 3) number of wins; 4) goals scored; 5) head to head; 6)higher position in the last season.
(Q) Qualified for the phase indicated

=== Group B ===
Pos	Team	Pld	W	D	L	GF	GA	GD	Pts	Qualification	HTA	HJE	MNE	MPT	BEI
1	Hapoel Tel Aviv (Q)	4	3	1	0	5	2	+3	10	Semi-finals	—	2–1			0–0
2	Hapoel Jerusalem	4	2	1	1	4	2	+2	7	5-8th classification play-offs		—		0–0	1–0
3	Maccabi Netanya	4	2	0	2	6	6	0	6	9-10th classification play-offs	1–2	0–2	—		
4	Maccabi Petah Tikva	4	1	1	2	3	4	−1	4	11-12th classification play-offs	0–1		1–3	—	
5	Beitar Jerusalem	4	0	1	3	1	5	−4	1	13-14th classification play-offs			1–2	0–2	—

Updated to match(es) played on unknown. Source: Israel Football Association
Rules for classification: 1) points; 2) goal difference; 3) number of wins; 4) goals scored; 5) head to head; 6)higher position in last season.
(Q) Qualified for the phase indicated

== European qualification route ==
=== Israel Super Cup ===
25 July 2021
20:30

Maccabi Haifa	2–0	Maccabi Tel Aviv
Atzili (yellow card) 1'; Sahar 50'; Meir (yellow card) 68'; Cohen (yellow card) 70'; Abu Fani 72', (yellow card) 90+2'; Maor Levi (yellow card) 90+1'	Report	(yellow card) 14' Glazer; (yellow card) 37' Nachmias

Sammy Ofer Stadium, Haifa
Attendance: 19,798
Referee: Liran Liany

=== UEFA qualifiers match ===
15 July 2021

F.C. Ashdod	1–2	Hapoel Be'er Sheva
Firas Abu Akel 58'		48' Bareiro; 61' Ansah

Yud-Alef Stadium, Ashdod

== Classification play-offs ==
=== 13–14th classification match ===
23 August 2021 13–14 place	Hapoel Nof HaGalil	0–0 (6–7 p)	Beitar Jerusalem	Nof HaGalil
20:00		Report		Stadium: Green Stadium

=== 11–12th classification match ===
21 August 2021 11–12 place	Ironi Kiryat Shmona	0–3	Maccabi Petah Tikva	Kiryat Shmona
19:00		Report		Stadium: Municipal Stadium

=== 9–10th classification match ===
21 August 2021 9–10 place	Hapoel Hadera	0–2	Maccabi Netanya	Netanya
20:30		Report		Stadium: Netanya Stadium

=== 7–8th classification match ===
21 August 2021 7–8 place	F.C. Ashdod	0–0 (4–5 p)	Bnei Sakhnin	Ashdod
20:00		Report		Stadium: Yud-Alef Stadium

=== 5–6th classification match ===
22 August 2021 5–6 place	Maccabi Tel Aviv	1–1 (5–6 p)	Hapoel Jerusalem	Tel Aviv
20:00	Hanzis 49'	Report	73' (pen.) Hadida	Stadium: Bloomfield Stadium

== Semi-finals ==
22 August 2021 Semi final	Hapoel Be'er Sheva	0–0 (5–4 p)	Hapoel Haifa	Be'er Sheva
20:30	Solomon (yellow card) 44'	Report	(yellow card) 90+1' Twito; (yellow card) 90+2' Cohen	Stadium: Turner Stadium; Attendance: 2,704; Referee: Idan Leiba
	Penalties
	Gordana (penalty scored); Asprilla (penalty scored); Micha (penalty missed); Abu Abaid (penalty scored); Petrucci (penalty scored); Shechter (penalty scored)		(penalty scored) Cohen; (penalty missed) Kapiloto; (penalty scored) Ožbolt; (penalty scored) Mishpati; (penalty scored) Twito; (penalty missed) Serdal

22 August 2021 Semi final	Maccabi Haifa	2–0	Hapoel Tel Aviv	Haifa
20:45	Mohamed (yellow card) 18'; Mohammad Jaber (yellow card) 36'; Gershon (yellow card) 83'; Abu Fani 88'; David 90+2'	Report	(yellow card) 19' Einbinder; (yellow card) 59' Bitton	Stadium: Sammy Ofer Stadium; Attendance: 9,483; Referee: Gal Leibovich

== Final ==
22 September 2021 Final	Maccabi Haifa	1–1 (7–6 p)	Hapoel Be'er Sheva	Netanya
20:15	Levi (yellow card) 5'; Atzili (yellow card) 61'; Planić (yellow card) 74'; David 85'	Report	(yellow card) 35' Abd Elhamed; 45' Bareiro; (yellow card) 55' Glazer; (yellow card) 55' Abu Abaid	Stadium: Netanya Stadium; Attendance: 14,000; Referee: Igal Frid
	Penalties
	Chery (penalty scored); Haziza (penalty scored); Atzili (penalty missed); David (penalty scored); Dahan (penalty scored) Mahmoud Jaber (penalty scored) Goldberg (penalty scored) Meir (penalty scored)		(penalty scored) Gordana; (penalty scored) Lopes; (penalty missed) Bareiro (penalty scored) Ansah; (penalty scored) Rukavytsya; (penalty scored) Dadia; (penalty scored) Vítor; (penalty missed) Micha

== Final rankings ==
R	Team
1	Maccabi Haifa
2	Hapoel Be'er Sheva
3	Hapoel Haifa
3	Hapoel Tel Aviv
5	Hapoel Jerusalem
6	Maccabi Tel Aviv
7	Bnei Sakhnin
8	F.C. Ashdod
9	Maccabi Netanya
10	Hapoel Hadera
11	Maccabi Petah Tikva
12	Ironi Kiryat Shmona
13	Beitar Jerusalem
14	Hapoel Nof HaGalil
