= Liran Liany =

Israeli football referee

Liran Liany (Hebrew: לירן ליאני; born 24 May 1977) is an Israeli football referee.

Liany became a FIFA referee in 2010. He refereed at the 2012–13, 2015-16 UEFA Europa League and 2017-18 UEFA Europa League.
