= 2022–23 Maccabi Haifa F.C. season =

Football season

Maccabi Haifa
2022–23 season
- President: Ya'akov Shahar
- Head coach: Barak Bakhar
- Stadium: Sammy Ofer
- Ligat Ha'Al: 1st
- State Cup: Quarter-finals
- Toto Cup: 5th
- Super Cup: Runners-up
- Champions League: Group stage
- Top goalscorer: League: Omer Atzili (21); All: Omer Atzili (26)
- Highest home attendance: 30,464 (vs S.L. Benfica 2 November 2022)
- Lowest home attendance: 17,224 (vs Bnei Sakhnin 8 December 2022)
- Average home league attendance: 28,418
Home colours	Away colours	Third colours
- All statistics correct as of 2 January 2023.

The 2022–23 season was Maccabi Haifa's 65th season in the Israeli Premier League, and its 41st consecutive season in the top division of Israeli football.

On 23 August, the club achieved qualification to the UEFA Champions League group stage for the third time in its history after a 2–2 draw with Red Star Belgrade that saw the club advance 5–4 on aggregate.

== Squad ==
=== Squad information ===
N	Pos.	Nat.	Name	Age	Since	App	Goals	Ends	Transfer fee	Notes
2	DF	(Sweden)	Daniel Sundgren	35	2022/2023	19	1	2023/2024	Free	
3	DF	(Israel)	Sean Goldberg	30	2021/2022	70	1	2022/2023	Free	Second nationality:Italy
4	MF	(Niger)	Ali Mohamed	30	2021/2022	71	2	2023/2024	1,400,000€	Second nationality:Israel
7	FW	(Israel)	Omer Atzili	32	2020/2021	103	38	2025/2026	Free	Second nationality:Romania
8	FW	(Israel)	Dolev Haziza	32	2019/2020	148	26	2023/2024	310,000€	Second nationality:France
9	FW	(Haiti)	Frantzdy Pierrot	30	2022/2023	26	10	2024/2025	1,700,000€	Second nationality:United States
10	MF	(Suriname)	Tjaronn Chery (captain)	37	2019/2020	162	45	2022/2023	Free	Second nationality:Nederland
11	FW	(Republic of the Congo)	Mavis Tchibota	29	2021/2022	32	2	2023/2024	1,000,000€	Second nationality:Israel
12	DF	(Israel)	Sun Menahem (vice captain)	32	2015/2016	226	11	2023/2024	20,000€	
13	FW	(Australia)	Nikita Rukavytsya	38	2016/2017	213	82	2022/2023	Free	Second nationality:Israel
14	FW	(Israel)	Ben Sahar	36	2021/2022	36	3	2022/2023	Free	
16	MF	(Israel)	Mohammad Abu Fani	27	2016/2017	134	12	2025/2026	Youth system	
17	FW	(Israel)	Suf Podgoreanu	23	2019/2020	6	0	2023/2024	Free	Originally from youth system
18	MF	(Israel)	Goni Naor	26	2022/2023	0	0	2024/2025	542,000€	
19	DF	(France)	Dylan Batubinsika	29	2022/2023	13	1	2022/2023	Free	
21	FW	(Israel)	Dean David	29	2021/2022	80	31	2024/2025	1,100,000€	
22	DF	(Israel)	Raz Meir	29	2017/2018	147	4	2024/2025	Youth system	Originally from youth system
23	MF	(Israel)	Aviel Zargari	23	2022/2023	0	0	2024/2025	485,000€	
26	MF	(Israel)	Mahmoud Jaber	26	2021/2022	33	3	2023/2024	Youth system	
27	DF	(France)	Pierre Cornud	29	2022/2023	24	0	2023/2024	Free	
30	DF	(Senegal)	Abdoulaye Seck	33	2022/2023	14	3	2023/2024	400,000€	
35	MF	(Israel)	Bassam Zarora	23	2022/2023	0	0	2024/2025	Youth system	
36	DF	(Israel)	Inon Eliyahu	32	2022/2023	3	0	2022/2023	Free	
44	GK	(United States)	Josh Cohen	33	2019/2020	149	0	2022/2023	Free	Second nationality:Israel
40	GK	(Israel)	Shareef Kayouf	24	2021/2022	0	0	2022/2023	Free	
55	DF	(Israel)	Rami Gershon	37	2017/2018	103	2	2022/2023	400,000€	
77	GK	(Israel)	Roee Fucs	27	2021/2021	2	0	2022/2023	Free	Originally from youth system
90	GK	(Israel)	Roi Mishpati	33	2021/2022	11	0	2022/2023	Free	
91	MF	(Israel)	Dia Saba	33	2022/2023	0	0	2025/2026	Free	

- Last updated: 30 January 2023
- Source: mhaifafc.com, Israel Football Association, UEFA Players transfer,
- Ordered by squad number.

== Transfers ==
=== Transfers in ===
Date	Pos.	Player	Age	From	Fee	Source
31 May 2022	DF	(Israel) Inon Eliyahu	32	(Israel) Maccabi Petah Tikva	Free	
31 May 2022	DF	(Sweden) Daniel Sundgren	35	(Greece) Aris Thessaloniki	Free	
22 June 2022	FW	(Australia) Nikita Rukavytsya	38	(Israel) Hapoel Be'er Sheva	Free	
1 July 2022	FW	(Haiti) Frantzdy Pierrot	30	(France) Guingamp	€1,700,000	
1 September 2022	DF	(Senegal) Abdoulaye Seck	33	(Belgium) Royal Antwerp	€400,000	
12 January 2023	MF	(Israel) Aviel Zargari	23	(Israel) Beitar Jerusalem	Part of deal	
25 January 2023	MF	(Israel) Goni Naor	26	(Israel) Hapoel Jerusalem	€500,000	
30 January 2023	FW	(Israel) Dia Saba	26	(Turkey) Sivasspor	Free	

=== Transfers out ===
Date	Pos.	Player	Age	To	Fee	Source
16 June 2022	GK	(Israel) Itamar Israeli	33	(Israel) Beitar Jerusalem	Free	
1 July 2022	DF	(Australia) Ryan Strain	28	(Scotland) St Mirren	Free	
1 July 2022	DF	(Guadeloupe) Mickaël Alphonse	36	(France) Ajaccio	Free	
1 July 2022	FW	(Ghana) Godsway Donyoh	31	(Azerbaijan) Neftçi	Free	
1 July 2022	MF	(Spain) José Rodríguez	31	(Belgium) Royale UG	Free	
3 July 2022	DF	(Israel) Taleb Tawatha	33	(Israel) Bnei Sakhnin	Free	
26 August 2022	DF	(Serbia) Bogdan Planić	33	(United Arab Emirates) Shabab Al Ahli Club	€1,800,000	
27 January 2023	MF	(Israel) Neta Lavi	29	(Japan) Gamba Osaka	€500,000	

=== Loans in ===
Date	Position	Player	Age	From	Fee	Source
1 July 2022	DF	(France) Pierre Cornud	29	(Spain) Real Oviedo	€300,000	
31 August 2022	DF	(France) Dylan Batubinsika	29	(Portugal) Famalicão	Free	
2 September 2022	MF	(Israel) Suf Podgoreanu	23	(Italy) Spezia	Free	

=== Loans return ===
Date	Position	Player	Age	From	Fee	Source
6 January 2023	MF	(Israel) Bassam Zarora	23	(Israel) Hapoel Afula	Free	
18 January 2023	GK	(Israel) Shareef Kayouf	24	(Israel) Hapoel Afula	Free	

=== Loans out ===
Date	Pos.	Player	Age	To	Fee	Source
16 June 2022	FW	(Israel) Stav Nahmani	23	(Israel) Beitar Jerusalem	Free	
31 July 2022	GK	(Israel) Liav Salkind	22	(Israel) Hapoel Afula	Free	
31 July 2022	DF	(Israel) Adar Azruel	23	(Israel) Hapoel Afula	Free	
31 July 2022	DF	(Ghana) David Acquah	24	(Israel) Hapoel Afula	Free	
31 July 2022	DF	(Israel) Roey Elimelech	23	(Israel) Hapoel Afula	Free	
31 July 2022	DF	(Israel) Tamir Arbel	23	(Israel) Hapoel Afula	Free	
31 July 2022	DF	(Israel) Rony Laufer	23	(Israel) Hapoel Afula	Free	
31 July 2022	MF	(Israel) Bassam Zarora	23	(Israel) Hapoel Afula	Free	
31 July 2022	MF	(Israel) Roy Moshe Katri	23	(Israel) Hapoel Afula	Free	
16 August 2022	GK	(Israel) Shareef Kayouf	24	(Israel) Hapoel Afula	Free	
28 September 2022	MF	(Israel) Nehorai Ifrach	22	(Israel) Hapoel Hadera	Free	
28 September 2022	DF	(Israel) Ori Dahan	26	(Israel) Beitar Jerusalem	Free	
10 January 2023	MF	(Israel) Maor Levi	25	(Israel) Maccabi Petah Tikva	Free	
21 February 2023	DF	(Israel) Ofri Arad	27	(Kazakhstan) Kairat	Free	
23 January 2023	FW	(Israel) Stav Nahmani	23	(Israel) Hapoel Hadera	€350,000	

== Pre-season and friendlies ==
Win Draw Loss

23 June 2022	Maccabi Haifa	4–1	F.C. Ashdod	Kfar Galim
18:30	Chery 18' (pen.); Tchibota 22'; Yinon Eliyahu 50'; Ihab Abu Alshikh 63'	Report	58' Roi Lavy	Stadium: Kfar Galim Training Ground

28 June 2022	Maccabi Haifa	2–1	Maccabi Netanya	Haifa
18:30	David 26'; Ilay Hagag 74'	Report	75' Yaniv Mizrahi	Stadium: Ketzef

1 July 2022	Maccabi Haifa	4–1	Hapoel Afula	Haifa
9:00	Tchibota 24'; David 48', 50'; Rukavytsya 68'	Report	72' Ilay Ezer	Stadium: Ketzef

5 July 2022	Maccabi Haifa	2–2	Maccabi Bnei Reineh	Haifa
18:30	Haziza 21'; Rukavytsya 67'	Report	9' Abed; 74' (o.g.) Arad	Stadium: Ketzef

9 July 2022	Maccabi Haifa (Israel)	0–1	(Belgium) Mechelen	Mechelen
		Report	90+3' Schoofs	Stadium: AFAS Stadion

10 July 2022	Maccabi Haifa (Israel)	4–0	(Belgium) Westerlo	Mierlo
	Tchibota 12'; Levi 28'; Ilay Hagag 46'; Abu Fani 52'	Report

12 July 2022	Maccabi Haifa (Israel)	0–1	(Netherlands) Vitesse
19:00		Report	56' (pen.) Bero

Veria (Greece)	1–1	(Israel) Maccabi Haifa

Aris Thessaloniki (Greece)	2–2	(Israel) Maccabi Haifa

== Competitions ==
=== Overview ===
Competition	First match	Last match	Starting round	Final position	Record							
Competition	First match	Last match	Starting round	Final position	Pld	W	D	L	GF	GA	GD	Win %
Ligat Ha'Al	27 August 2022	20 May 2023	Matchday 1	Winners	36	27	3	6	76	34	+42	75.00
State Cup	12 December 2022	28 February 2023	Round of 32	Quarter-Final	4	2	1	1	9	5	+4	50.00
Toto Cup	8 December 2022	8 December 2022	European qualification route	5th	1	1	0	0	4	1	+3	100.00
Super Cup	16 July 2022	16 July 2022	Final	Runners-up	1	0	0	1	1	1	+0	0.00
UEFA Champions League	2 November 2022	2 November 2022	Second qualifying round	Group stage	12	4	2	6	21	28	−7	33.33
Total					54	34	6	14	111	69	+42	62.96

Last updated: 20 May 2023
Source: Competitions

== Ligat Ha'Al ==
=== Regular season ===
==== Regular season table ====
Pos	Team	Pld	W	D	L	GF	GA	GD	Pts	Qualification or relegation
1	Maccabi Haifa	26	20	2	4	51	24	+27	62	Qualification for the Championship round
2	Hapoel Be'er Sheva	26	18	4	4	52	19	+33	58	Qualification for the Championship round
3	Maccabi Tel Aviv	26	15	7	4	53	15	+38	52	Qualification for the Championship round
4	Maccabi Netanya	26	10	7	9	33	38	−5	37	Qualification for the Championship round
5	Hapoel Jerusalem	26	9	9	8	30	26	+4	36	Qualification for the Championship round

Source: Soccerway
Rules for classification: 1) Points; 2) Goal difference; 3) Matches won; 4) Goals scored; 5) Head-to-head points; 6) Head-to-head goal difference; 7) Head-to-head goals scored; 8) Play-off.

==== Matches ====
Win Draw Loss

30 August 2022 1	Bnei Sakhnin	0–1	Maccabi Haifa	Sakhnin
20:15	Puljić (yellow card) 51'	Report	67' Goldberg; (yellow card) 86' Haziza	Stadium: Doha Stadium; Attendance: 4,213; Referee: Gal Leibovich

27 August 2022 2	Maccabi Haifa	4–1	Maccabi Netanya	Haifa
20:00	Haziza (yellow card) 35'; Atzili 45+5', 78' (pen.), 87'; Goldberg (yellow card) 74'; Chery 90'	Report	22' Zlatanović; (yellow card) 24' Rotman; (yellow card) 32' Hartherz; (yellow card) 35' Avraham; (yellow card) 76' Enow; (yellow card) 86' Karem Jaber	Stadium: Sammy Ofer Stadium; Attendance: 28,264; Referee: Snir Lavi

3 September 2022 3	Hapoel Be'er Sheva	1–2	Maccabi Haifa	Be'er Sheva
20:15	Hemed 2'; Elhamed (yellow card) 35'; Lopes (yellow card) 39'; Glazer (yellow card) 39'; Safouri (yellow card) 42' (yellow-red card) 45'; Shechter (yellow card) 45'	Report	(yellow card) 25', (goal) 40' (pen.) Atzili; (yellow card) 40' Sundgren; (yellow card) 42' Lavi; (yellow card) 48' Mohamed; (yellow card) 80' Abu Fani; 90+2' Pierrot	Stadium: Turner Stadium; Attendance: 14,425; Referee: Igal Frid

10 September 2022 4	Maccabi Haifa	3–1	Sektzia Nes Tziona	Haifa
18:00	Atzili 21', 53'; Batubinsika (yellow card) 48'; Chery 77'	Report	25' Plumain; (yellow card) 50' Yerushalmi; (red card) 90' Itay Rotman	Stadium: Sammy Ofer Stadium; Attendance: 28,456; Referee: Erez Papir

18 September 2022 5	Hapoel Jerusalem	3–0	Maccabi Haifa	Jerusalem
20:15	Ofek Biton 22', 35'; Togui 53'	Report	(yellow card) 47' Abu Fani	Stadium: Teddy Stadium; Attendance: 6,831; Referee: Aviad Shiloach

1 October 2022 6	Maccabi Haifa	2–0	Maccabi Tel Aviv	Haifa
20:30	Lavi (yellow card) 80'; David 85', 90+1'; Sundgren (yellow card) 90'	Report	(yellow card) 35' Kanichowsky; (yellow card) 44' Saborit; (yellow card) 88' Guiagon	Stadium: Sammy Ofer Stadium; Attendance: 29,801; Referee: Eitan Shmuelevitz

8 October 2022 7	Maccabi Bnei Reineh	1–0	Maccabi Haifa	Nof HaGalil
20:15	Azulay 40'; Ashraf Rabah (yellow card) 45'; Spendlhofer (yellow card) 61'; Yanko (yellow card) 77'; Boateng (yellow card) 90'	Report	(red card) 37' Eliyahu; (yellow card) 55' Seck	Stadium: Green Stadium; Attendance: 4,769; Referee: Idan Leiba

17 October 2022 8	Maccabi Haifa	1–0	Hapoel Hadera	Haifa
20:30	Pierrot (yellow card) 24', (goal) 73'; Sundgren (yellow card) 88'; Tchibota (yellow card) 90'; Levi (yellow card) 90+2'; Atzili (yellow card) 90+3'	Report	(yellow card) 58' Tomer Machluf; (yellow card) 85', (penalty missed) 90+4 Menashe Zalka	Stadium: Sammy Ofer Stadium; Attendance: 29,764; Referee: Snir Levi

22 October 2022 9	Ironi Kiryat Shmona	2–3	Maccabi Haifa	Kiryat Shmona
20:15	Shviro 37', 53'	Report	27' Pierrot; 48' Chery; (yellow card) 70', (goal) 81' Batubinsika; (yellow card) 70' Lavi	Stadium: Kiryat Shmona Municipal Stadium; Attendance: 5,202; Referee: Nael Odeh

29 October 2022 10	Maccabi Haifa	3–1	F.C. Ashdod	Haifa
17:00	Awany 23' (o.g.); Pierrot 34'; Abu Fani 73'	Report	16' Seck (o.g.); (yellow card) 18' Zasno	Stadium: Sammy Ofer Stadium; Attendance: 29,176; Referee: Gal Leibovich

6 November 2022 11	Beitar Jerusalem	1–4	Maccabi Haifa	Jerusalem
20:30	Nicolaescu 45+3'; Mejías (yellow card) 66'	Report	(yellow card) 22' Menahem; 28' Pierrot; (yellow card) 38' Abu Fani; (yellow card) 45' David; 56' (pen.) Atzili; (yellow card) 61' Cornud; 79' Seck; 83' Gershon	Stadium: Teddy Stadium; Attendance: 19,000; Referee: Orel Grinfeld

9 November 2022 12	Hapoel Haifa	0–1	Maccabi Haifa	Haifa
20:30	Elhamed (red card) 90'	Report	(yellow card) 39' Cornud; 59' Elhamed (o.g.); (yellow card) 64' Goldberg	Stadium: Sammy Ofer Stadium; Attendance: 26,900; Referee: Idan Leiba

13 November 2022 13	Maccabi Haifa	5–2	Hapoel Tel Aviv	Haifa
20:30	Chery 11'; David 15'; Atzili 19', 31'; Abu Fani 64'	Report	38' (pen.) Einbinder; (yellow card) 42' Bitton; (yellow card) 70' Roemeratoe; 85' Raz Twizer	Stadium: Sammy Ofer Stadium; Attendance: 29,742; Referee: Snir Levi

19 December 2022 14	Maccabi Haifa	3–1	Bnei Sakhnin	Haifa
20:15	David 33'; Seck (yellow card) 81'; Atzili 83' (pen.); Rukavytsya 87'	Report	(yellow card) 17' Gaby Joury; (yellow card) 85' Jérémie Luvovadio; 90' Melamed	Stadium: Sammy Ofer Stadium; Attendance: 27,152; Referee: Nael Odeh

26 December 2022 15	Maccabi Netanya	0–2	Maccabi Haifa	Netanya
20:30	Amir Berkovic (yellow card) 12'; Karem Jaber (yellow card) 30'	Report	(yellow card) 14' Seck; (yellow card) 35' Abu Fani; (yellow card) 47' Cornud; 55' Chery; (yellow card) 47' Meir; 78' David	Stadium: Netanya Stadium; Attendance: 11,317; Referee: Orel Grinfeld

1 January 2023 16	Maccabi Haifa	2–0	Hapoel Be'er Sheva	Haifa
20:30	David 16', 54'; Goldberg (yellow card) 45+5'; Abu Fani (yellow card) 45+5'; Pierrot (yellow card) 78'; Tchibota (yellow card) 90'	Report	(penalty missed) 45+6 Suleymanov; (yellow card) 49' Shamir; (yellow card) 58' Lopes; (yellow card) 90' Hatuel	Stadium: Sammy Ofer Stadium; Attendance: 29,891; Referee: Roi Reinshreiber

8 January 2023 17	Sektzia Nes Tziona	0–2	Maccabi Haifa	Petah Tikva
20:15	Keita (yellow card) 57' (yellow-red card) 87'; Ben Harush (yellow card) 85'; Yoni Stoyanov (yellow card) 88'	Report	21' David; 58' (pen.) Atzili	Stadium: HaMoshava Stadium; Attendance: 10,358; Referee: Snir Levi

15 January 2023 18	Maccabi Haifa	2–1	Hapoel Jerusalem	Haifa
20:15	Seck 2'; Atzili 18'; Menahem (yellow card) 13'; Roi Mishpati (yellow card) 14'; Chery (yellow card) 42'	Report	15' (pen.) Badash; (yellow card) 20' Ofek Bitton; (yellow card) 70' Nidam; (red card) 90+2' Adeleye	Stadium: Sammy Ofer Stadium; Attendance: 27,854; Referee: Shalom Ben Avraham

23 January 2023 19	Maccabi Tel Aviv	3–0	Maccabi Haifa	Tel Aviv
20:30	Geraldes (yellow card) 38'; Guiagon 45'; Zahavi 63', 85'; Rikan (yellow card) 69'	Report	(yellow card) 20' (yellow-red card) 69' Abu Fani; (yellow card) 60' Seck; (yellow card) 72' Roi Mishpati; (yellow card) 79' Batubinsika	Stadium: Bloomfield Stadium; Attendance: 27,279; Referee: Orel Grinfeld

28 January 2023 20	Maccabi Haifa	0–0	Maccabi Bnei Reineh	Haifa
15:00	Chery (yellow card) 45'; Haziza (yellow card) 82'	Report	(yellow card) 45' Amit Meir; (yellow card) 52' Lukas Spendlhofer; (yellow card) 68' Dolev Azruel; (yellow card) 83' Khalaila	Stadium: Sammy Ofer Stadium; Attendance: 24,753; Referee: Igal Frid

8 February 2023 21	Hapoel Hadera	1–1	Maccabi Haifa	Netanya
20:30	Nahmani 57'; Levkovich (yellow card) 89'; Eyal Hen (yellow card) 90+6'	Report	(yellow card) 56' Tchibota; 81' Batubinsika; (yellow card) 90+4' Cornud	Stadium: Netanya Stadium; Attendance: 8,800; Referee: Gal Leibovich

11 February 2023 22	Maccabi Haifa	2–0	Ironi Kiryat Shmona	Haifa
19:30	Chery 66'; Haziza 87', (yellow card) 88'	Report		Stadium: Sammy Ofer Stadium; Attendance: Roi Reinshreiber; Referee: 29,073

18 February 2023 23	F.C. Ashdod	3–1	Maccabi Haifa	Ashdod
19:30	Shalev Harush 7'; Ohana 30'; Ben Zaken (yellow card) 39'; Berihon (yellow card) 80', (goal) 90+2'	Report	50' Saba; (yellow card) 81' Abu Fani	Stadium: Yud-Alef Stadium; Attendance: 6,470; Referee: Igal Frid

25 February 2023 24	Maccabi Haifa	2–1	Beitar Jerusalem	Haifa
20:00	Abu Fani (yellow card) 32'; Pierrot 45+1'; Chery 61'; Atzili (penalty missed) 76	Report	11' (pen.) Shua; (yellow card) 38' (yellow-red card) 45+3' Morozov; (yellow card) 45+3' Asprilla	Stadium: Sammy Ofer Stadium; Attendance: 29,352; Referee: Gal Leibovich

6 March 2023 25	Maccabi Haifa	4–1	Hapoel Haifa	Haifa
20:30	Atzili 3', 5', 72'; Sundgren (yellow card) 33'; Chery 56'; Cohen (yellow card) 69'	Report	(yellow card) 33' Twito; (yellow card) 40', (goal) 68' Serdal; (yellow card) 69' Malul; (yellow card) 88' Maman	Stadium: Sammy Ofer Stadium; Attendance: 29,105; Referee: Snir Levi

13 March 2023 26	Hapoel Tel Aviv	0–1	Maccabi Haifa	Tel Aviv
20:30	Gurfinkel (yellow card) 72'; Roemeratoe (yellow card) 76'; Boljević (yellow card) 90+5'	Report	(yellow card) 10' Abu Fani; 70', (yellow card) 72' Atzili	Stadium: Bloomfield Stadium; Attendance: 24,900; Referee: Eitan Shmuelevitz

==== Results overview ====
Win Draw Loss

Opposition	Home score	Away score
Beitar Jerusalem	2–1	4–1
Bnei Sakhnin	3–1	1–0
F.C. Ashdod	3–1	1–3
Hapoel Be'er Sheva	2–0	2–1
Hapoel Hadera	1–0	1–1
Hapoel Haifa	4–1	1–0
Hapoel Jerusalem	2–1	0–3
Hapoel Tel Aviv	5–2	1–0
Ironi Kiryat Shmona	2–0	3–2
Maccabi Bnei Reineh	0–0	0–1
Maccabi Netanya	4–1	2–0
Maccabi Tel Aviv	2–0	0–3
Sektzia Nes Tziona	3–1	2–0

=== Championship round ===
==== Championship round table ====
Pos	Team	Pld	W	D	L	GF	GA	GD	Pts	Qualification	MHA	HBS	MTA	HJE	MNE	ASH
1	Maccabi Haifa (C)	36	27	3	6	76	34	+42	81 (Note: Maccabi Haifa had 3 points deducted.)	Qualification for the Champions League first qualifying round	—	1–0	3–1	5–0	4–1	2–1
2	Hapoel Be'er Sheva	36	24	5	7	65	29	+36	74 (Note: Hapoel Be'er Sheva had 3 points deducted.)	Qualification for the Europa Conference League second qualifying round	2–1	—	1–2	1–0	2–0	3–1
3	Maccabi Tel Aviv	36	21	10	5	69	23	+46	73	Qualification for the Europa Conference League second qualifying round	1–1	3–0	—	2–1	2–0	1–1
4	Hapoel Jerusalem	36	12	9	15	38	44	−6	45		2–1	1–2	0–2	—	1–4	0–1
5	Maccabi Netanya	36	12	9	15	44	58	−14	45		1–5	1–1	0–0	0–2	—	2–0
6	Ashdod	36	11	10	15	41	46	−5	43		1–2	0–1	1–2	0–1	3–2	—

Source: Soccerway
Rules for classification: 1) Points; 2) Goal difference; 3) Matches won; 4) Goals scored; 5) Head-to-head points; 6) Head-to-head goal difference; 7) Head-to-head goals scored; 8) Play-off.
(C) Champions

==== Matches ====
18 March 2023 27	Maccabi Haifa	2–1	F.C. Ashdod	Haifa
20:00	Saba (yellow card) 5'; Batubinsika (red card) 11'; (yellow card) 24' Abu Fani; Atzili (yellow card) 15', (goal) 26' (pen.), 32' (pen.); Cornud (yellow card) 69'	Report	12' (pen.) Acolatse; (penalty missed) 17 Kna'an; (yellow card) 32' Sennan; (yellow card) 47' Shahaf	Stadium: Sammy Ofer Stadium; Attendance: 28,076; Referee: Aviad Shiloach

1 April 2023 28	Maccabi Haifa	1–0	Hapoel Be'er Sheva	Haifa
20:00	Pierrot 28'; Sundgren (yellow card) 67'; Gershon (yellow card) 69'	Report	(yellow card) 5' Yehezkel; (yellow card) 45' Bareiro	Stadium: Sammy Ofer Stadium; Attendance: 29,875; Referee: Orel Grinfeld

4 April 2023 29	Maccabi Tel Aviv	1–1	Maccabi Haifa	Tel Aviv
20:30	Peretz (yellow card) 13'; Zahavi (yellow card) 30'; Jovanović 40'; Geraldes (yellow card) 57'; Rikan (yellow card) 89'	Report	(yellow card) 12', (goal) 86' Seck; (yellow card) 70' Sundgren; (yellow card) 76' David	Stadium: Bloomfield Stadium; Attendance: 26,330; Referee: Roi Reinshreiber

8 April 2023 30	Maccabi Haifa	4–1	Maccabi Netanya	Haifa
20:00	Batubinsika (yellow card) 21'; Haziza (yellow card) 31'; Cornud (yellow card) 47'; Atzili 56', 59'; Mohamed (yellow card) 72'; Saba 85'; Abu Fani 90+5'	Report	(yellow card) 10' Gandelman; (yellow card) 11' Shlomo; 19' Zlatanović; (yellow card) 49' Galabov	Stadium: Sammy Ofer Stadium; Attendance: 29,413; Referee: Igal Frid

15 April 2023 31	Hapoel Jerusalem	2–1	Maccabi Haifa	Jerusalem
18:30	Badash 82' (pen.); Ofek Biton 90'; Omer Agvadish (yellow card) 90+9'	Report	68' Atzili; (yellow card) 90+1' Sundgren	Stadium: Teddy Stadium; Attendance: 18,760; Referee: Idan Leiba

23 April 2023 32	F.C. Ashdod	1–2	Maccabi Haifa	Ashdod
20:30	Shavit Mazal (yellow card) 42'; Gerafi (yellow card) 45'; Adir Levi (yellow card) 83'	Report	78' David; 89' (pen.) Atzili	Stadium: Yud-Alef Stadium; Attendance: 6,479; Referee: Orel Grinfeld

1 May 2023 33	Hapoel Be'er Sheva	2–1	Maccabi Haifa	Be'er Sheva
20:30	16' Eugene Ansah; (yellow card) 38' Suleymanov; (yellow card) 76' Klimala; (yellow card) 87' Lopes; (yellow card) 90+2' Vítor; 90+6' Bareiro	Report	11' (o.g.) Tibi; (yellow card) 28' Seck; (yellow card) 77' Chery; (yellow card) 87' Atzili; (yellow card) 90+5' Cornud	Stadium: Turner Stadium; Attendance: 10,727; Referee: Roi Reinshreiber

8 May 2023 34	Maccabi Haifa	3–1	Maccabi Tel Aviv	Haifa
20:30	Atzili (yellow card) 13'; Haziza 37', (yellow card) 67'; Saba 50'; Geraldes 62' (o.g.); Abu Fani (yellow card) 87'; Cornud (yellow card) 90+6'	Report	14' Kanichowsky; (yellow card) 40' Jovanović; (yellow card) 53' Guiagon; (yellow card) 63' Biton; (yellow card) 90+6' Cohen	Stadium: Sammy Ofer Stadium; Attendance: 28,752; Referee: Orel Grinfeld

15 May 2023 35	Maccabi Netanya	1–5	Maccabi Haifa	Netanya
20:30	Avraham (yellow card) 23'; Zlatanović 40'; Karem Jaber (yellow card) 82'	Report	16' Chery; (yellow card) 46', (goal) 53', 89' Saba; 59' Abu Fani; (penalty missed) 83, 83' Pierrot	Stadium: Netanya Stadium; Attendance: 12,960; Referee: Aviad Shiloach

20 May 2023 36	Maccabi Haifa	5–0	Hapoel Jerusalem	Haifa
20:30	David 15'; Pierrot 37'; Adeleye 41' (o.g.); Chery 61'; Rukavytsya (yellow card) 71'; Saba 78'	Report	(yellow card) 71' Bačo; (yellow card) 77' Ashta	Stadium: Sammy Ofer Stadium; Attendance: 30,364; Referee: Eitan Shmuelevich

==== Results overview ====
Win Draw Loss

Opposition	Home score	Away score
F.C. Ashdod	2–1	2–1
Hapoel Be'er Sheva	1–0	1–2
Hapoel Jerusalem	5–0	1–2
Maccabi Netanya	4–1	5–1
Maccabi Tel Aviv	3–1	1–1

=== Overall ===
==== Results summary ====
Overall								Home						Away					
Pld	W	D	L	GF	GA	GD	Pts	W	D	L	GF	GA	GD	W	D	L	GF	GA	GD
36	28	2	6	76	34	+42	86	17	1	0	48	12	+36	11	1	6	28	22	+6

Last updated: 20 May 2023.
Source: Competitive matches

==== Results by round ====
Round	1	2	3	4	5	6	7	8	9	10	11	12	13	14	15	16	17	18	19	20	21	22	23	24	25	26	27	28	29	30	31	32	33	34	35	36
Ground	A	H	A	H	A	H	A	H	A	H	A	A	H	H	A	H	A	H	A	H	A	H	A	H	H	A	H	H	A	H	A	A	A	H	A	H
Result	W	W	W	W	L	W	L	W	W	W	W	W	W	W	W	W	W	W	L	D	D	W	L	W	W	W	W	W	D	W	L	W	L	W	W	W
Position	4	2	2	1	2	1	2	2	2	1	1	1	1	1	1	1	1	1	1	1	1	1	1	1	1	1	1	1	1	1	1	1	1	1	1	1

Updated to match(es) played on 20 May 2023. Source: Competitive Matches
A = Away; H = Home; W = Win; D = Draw; L = Loss

== State Cup ==
12 December 2022 Round of 32	Hapoel Nof HaGalil (2)	0–1	Maccabi Haifa (1)	Nof HaGalil
20:30	Tweh (yellow card) 16'; Guti (yellow card) 17'; Levi (yellow card) 38'	Report	(yellow card) 22' Gershon; 39' Abu Fani; (yellow card) 58' Tchibota; (yellow card) 72' Levi	Stadium: Green Stadium; Attendance: 5,200; Referee: Aviad Shiloach

4 January 2023 Round of 16	Maccabi Haifa (1)	5–1	Hapoel Haifa (1)	Haifa
20:15	Lavi 8'; Tchibota 18', (yellow card) 62'; Seck 77'; Atzili 78'; David 88'	Report	(red card) 23' Arel; (yellow card) 45' Quee; (yellow card) Twito; 60' Itay Buganim	Stadium: Sammy Ofer Stadium; Attendance: 28,343; Referee: Gal Leibovich

31 January 2023 Quarter-finals — First leg	Maccabi Netanya (1)	2–2	Maccabi Haifa (1)	Netanya
20:30	Patrick Twumasi 49'; Omri Gandelman 60'; Aviv Avraham (yellow card) 62'	Report	31', (yellow card) 59' David; 88' Abu Fani	Stadium: Netanya Stadium; Attendance: Aviad Shiloach; Referee: 10,451

28 February 2023 Quarter-finals — Second leg	Maccabi Haifa (1)	1–2 (a.e.t.) (3–4 agg.)	Maccabi Netanya (1)	Haifa
20:00	Saba 28'; Sundgren (yellow card) 90'	Report	(yellow card) 45', (goal) 99' Twumasi; (yellow card) 47' Shlomo; 49', (yellow card) 54' Rotman; (yellow card) 106' Oz Bilu	Stadium: Sammy Ofer Stadium; Attendance: 28,000; Referee: Roi Reinshreiber

== Toto Cup ==
=== 5–6th classification match ===
8 December 2022 classification match	Maccabi Haifa	4–1	Bnei Sakhnin	Haifa
20:15	Chery 8'; Atzili 34'; David 37'; Arad 62'	Report	69' Awaed	Stadium: Sammy Ofer Stadium; Attendance: 17,224; Referee: Igal Frid

== Israel Super Cup ==
16 July 2022	Maccabi Haifa	1–1 (3–4 p)	Hapoel Be'er Sheva	Haifa
20:30	Atzili 1', (yellow card) 76'; Haziza (yellow card) 41'	Report	(yellow card) 45' Bareiro; (yellow card) 56', (goal) 70' Ansah; (yellow card) 75' Dadia	Stadium: Sammy Ofer Stadium; Attendance: 27,420; Referee: Roi Reinshreiber
	Penalties
	Chery (penalty scored); Abu Fani (penalty scored); Atzili (penalty missed); David (penalty scored); Pierrot (penalty missed)		(penalty missed) Madmon; (penalty scored) Lopes; (penalty scored) Yosefi; (penalty scored) Dadia; (penalty scored) Hemed

== UEFA Champions League ==
=== Second qualifying round ===
20 July 2022 2nd qualifying round – 1st leg	Maccabi Haifa (Israel)	1–1	(Greece) Olympiacos	Haifa
20:00 (IDT)	Sundgren (yellow card) 18'; Abu Fani (yellow card) 67'; Haziza 90+2', (yellow card) 90+3'	Report	7', (yellow card) 18' Zinckernagel; (yellow card) 36' Masouras; (yellow card) 43' Vrsaljko; (yellow card) 83' Kané; (yellow card) 87' Camara	Stadium: Sammy Ofer Stadium; Attendance: 29,654; Referee: Sascha Stegemann (Germany)

27 July 2022 2nd qualifying round – 2nd leg	Olympiacos (Greece)	0–4 (1–5 agg.)	(Israel) Maccabi Haifa	Piraeus
22:00 (IDT)	Tiquinho (yellow card) 26'; Cissé (yellow card) 26'; Reabciuk (yellow card) 32'; Kané (yellow card) 57'	Report	5' Chery; (yellow card) 26' Haziza; (yellow card) 45' Planić; (yellow card) 55' Mohamed; 61', 65' Pierrot; 87' Abu Fani; (yellow card) 90' Cohen	Stadium: Karaiskakis Stadium; Attendance: 21,705; Referee: Daniel Stefański (Poland)

=== Third qualifying round ===
3 August 2022 3rd qualifying round – 1st leg	Maccabi Haifa (Israel)	4–0	(Cyprus) Apollon Limassol	Haifa
20:00 (IDT)	Peybernes 38' (o.g.); Mohamed 54', 62'; Pierrot 79'	Report	(yellow card) 24' Panayiotou; (yellow card) 30' Khammas; (yellow card) 55' (yellow-red card) 60' Jovanović	Stadium: Sammy Ofer Stadium; Attendance: 29,876; Referee: Maurizio Mariani (Italy)

9 August 2022 3rd qualifying round – 2nd leg	Apollon Limassol (Cyprus)	2–0 (2–4 agg.)	(Israel) Maccabi Haifa	Nicosia
20:00 (IDT)	Pittas (yellow card) 11'; Ongenda 19'; Coll 27', (yellow card) 45'; Diguiny (yellow card) 42'; Ongenda (yellow card) 60'; Felix (yellow card) 88'	Report	(yellow card) 11' Abu Fani; (yellow card) 56' Menahem; (yellow card) 67' Cornud; (yellow card) 86' Sundgren	Stadium: GSP Stadium; Attendance: 3,936; Referee: Felix Zwayer (Germany)
Note: Apollon Limassol played their home match at the GSP Stadium in Nicosia, instead of their regular stadium, the Tsirio Stadium, in Limassol, which did not meet UEFA requirements.

=== Play-off round ===
17 August 2022 play-off round – 1st leg	Maccabi Haifa (Israel)	3–2	(Serbia) Red Star Belgrade	Haifa
22:00 (IDT)	Pierrot 18', 51'; Chery 61'; Menahem (yellow card) 86'	Report	27' Pešić; 36' Kanga; (yellow card) 47' Bukari	Stadium: Sammy Ofer Stadium; Attendance: 29,132; Referee: Carlos del Cerro Grande (Spain)

23 August 2022 play-off round – 2nd leg	Red Star Belgrade (Serbia)	2–2 (4–5 agg.)	(Israel) Maccabi Haifa	Belgrade
22:00 (IDT)	Pešić 27'; Ivanić 44', (yellow card) 89'; Dragović (yellow card) 45'; Rodić (yellow card) 73'	Report	(penalty missed) , (yellow card) 88' Haziza; 45+5', (yellow card) 85' Sundgren; 90' (o.g.) Milan Pavkov	Stadium: Red Star Stadium; Attendance: 47,731; Referee: Anthony Taylor (England)

=== Group stage ===
Pos	Team	Pld	W	D	L	GF	GA	GD	Pts	Qualification	BEN	PAR	JUV	MHA
1	(Portugal) Benfica	6	4	2	0	16	7	+9	14 (Note: Tied on head-to-head results, overall goal difference and overall goals scored. Overall away goals scored: Benfica 9, Paris Saint-Germain 6.)	Advance to knockout phase	—	1–1	4–3	2–0
2	(France) Paris Saint-Germain	6	4	2	0	16	7	+9	14	Advance to knockout phase	1–1	—	2–1	7–2
3	(Italy) Juventus	6	1	0	5	9	13	−4	3 (Note: Tied on head-to-head results. Overall goal difference is used as the tiebreaker.)	Transfer to Europa League	1–2	1–2	—	3–1
4	(Israel) Maccabi Haifa	6	1	0	5	7	21	−14	3		1–6	1–3	2–0	—

Source: UEFA
Rules for classification: Group stage tiebreakers
Notes:

6 September 2022 1	Benfica (Portugal)	2–0	(Israel) Maccabi Haifa	Lisbon
22:00 (IDT)	Ramos (yellow card) 45'; R. Silva 50'; Grimaldo 54'	Report	(yellow card) 58' Lavi; (yellow card) 63' Seck	Stadium: Estádio da Luz; Attendance: 55,130; Referee: Andreas Ekberg (Sweden)

14 September 2022 2	Maccabi Haifa (Israel)	1–3	(France) Paris Saint-Germain	Haifa
22:00 (IDT)	Chery 24'; Atzili (yellow card) 37'; Haziza (yellow card) 60'; Pierrot (yellow card) 78'	Report	36' Messi; 69' Mbappé; 88', (yellow card) 89' Neymar	Stadium: Sammy Ofer Stadium; Attendance: 30,421; Referee: Daniel Siebert (Germany)

5 October 2022 3	Juventus (Italy)	3–1	(Israel) Maccabi Haifa	Turin
22:00 (IDT)	Rabiot 36', 83'; Vlahović 50'; Sandro (yellow card) 80'	Report	(yellow card) 53' Tchibota; 75' David	Stadium: Juventus Stadium; Attendance: 28,498; Referee: Sandro Schärer (Sweden)

11 October 2022 4	Maccabi Haifa (Israel)	2–0	(Italy) Juventus	Haifa
19:45 (IDT)	Atzili 7', 42'; Cornud (yellow card) 27'	Report	(yellow card) 45' McKennie; (yellow card) 76' Locatelli	Stadium: Sammy Ofer Stadium; Attendance: 30,074; Referee: Antonio Mateu Lahoz (Spain)

25 October 2022 5	Paris Saint-Germain (France)	7–2	(Israel) Maccabi Haifa	Paris
22:00 (IDT)	Messi 19', 44'; Mbappé 32', 64'; Neymar (yellow card) 27', (goal) 35'; Ramos (yellow card) 40'; Goldberg 67' (o.g.); Soler 84'	Report	(yellow card) 26', (goal) 38', 50' Seck; (yellow card) 47' Chery; (yellow card) 54' Atzili; (yellow card) 74' Lavi	Stadium: Parc des Princes; Attendance: 46,435; Referee: Felix Zwayer (Germany)

2 November 2022 6	Maccabi Haifa (Israel)	1–6	(Portugal) Benfica	Haifa
22:00 (IDT)	Chery 26' (pen.); Abu Fani (yellow card) 85'; Menahem (yellow card) 89'; Atzili (yellow card) 90'	Report	20' Ramos; (yellow card) 45' Neres; 59' Musa; 69' Grimaldo; 73' Silva; 88' Araújo; 90' Mário	Stadium: Sammy Ofer Stadium; Attendance: 30,464; Referee: Anthony Taylor (England)

== Statistics ==
=== Squad statistics ===
			Ligat HaAl					State Cup					Toto Cup					Israel Super Cup					UCL					Total				
Nation	No.	Name		GS	Min.	Goal	As.		GS	Min.	Goal	As.		GS	Min.	Goal	As.		GS	Min.	Goal	As.		GS	Min.	Goal	As.		GS	Min.	Goal	As.
Goalkeepers
(Israel) (United States)	44	Josh Cohen	0	0	0	0	0	0	0	0	0	0	0	0	0	0	0	0	0	0	0	0	0	0	0	0	0	0	0	0	0	0
(Israel)	77	Roee Fucs	0	0	0	0	0	0	0	0	0	0	0	0	0	0	0	0	0	0	0	0	0	0	0	0	0	0	0	0	0	0
(Israel)	40	Shareef Kayouf	0	0	0	0	0	0	0	0	0	0	0	0	0	0	0	0	0	0	0	0	0	0	0	0	0	0	0	0	0	0
(Israel)	99	Nitai Greis	0	0	0	0	0	0	0	0	0	0	0	0	0	0	0	0	0	0	0	0	0	0	0	0	0	0	0	0	0	0
(Israel)	90	Roi Mishpati	8	8	720	0	0	4	4	390	0	0	1	1	90	0	0	0	0	0	0	0	0	0	0	0	0	13	13	1200	0	0
Defenders
(Sweden)	2	Daniel Sundgren	8	6	631	0	0	0	0	0	0	0	0	0	0	0	0	1	1	99	0	0	10	10	942	1	0	19	17	1,674	1	0
(Israel)	3	Sean Goldberg	11	11	1,083	1	0	0	0	0	0	0	0	0	0	0	0	1	1	99	0	0	12	12	1,777	0	0	24	24	2,359	1	0
(Israel)	12	Sun Menahem	14	4	527	0	1	2	0	140	0	0	0	0	0	0	0	1	0	30	0	0	9	1	190	0	0	12	2	391	0	0
(France)	19	Dylan Batubinsika	7	6	620	1	0	0	0	0	0	0	0	0	0	0	0	0	0	0	0	0	5	5	485	0	0	12	11	1,105	1	0
(Israel)	22	Raz Meir	4	3	292	0	0	0	0	0	0	0	0	0	0	0	0	0	0	0	0	0	2	1	0	0	0	6	4	379	0	0
(France)	27	Pierre Cornud	11	8	839	0	2	0	0	0	0	0	0	0	0	0	0	1	1	64	0	0	11	10	825	0	2	23	19	1,728	0	4
(Senegal)	30	Abdoulaye Seck	7	5	490	1	1	0	0	0	0	0	0	0	0	0	0	0	0	0	0	0	6	4	430	2	0	13	9	920	3	1
(Israel)	36	Inon Eliyahu	3	3	199	0	0	1	1	86	0	0	1	1	90	0	0	0	0	0	0	0	0	0	0	0	0	5	5	375	0	0
(Israel)	99	Yonatan Laish	0	0	0	0	0	0	0	0	0	0	0	0	0	0	0	0	0	0	0	0	0	0	0	0	0	0	0	0	0	0
(Israel)	55	Rami Gershon	3	0	33	1	0	0	0	0	0	0	0	0	0	0	0	0	0	0	0	0	1	0	4	0	0	4	0	37	1	0
Midfielders
(Niger)	4	Ali Mohamed	9	5	492	0	1	0	0	0	0	0	0	0	0	0	0	1	1	99	0	1	11	10	895	2	0	21	16	1,486	2	2
(The Gambia)	99	Sainey Colley	0	0	0	0	0	0	0	0	0	0	0	0	0	0	0	0	0	0	0	0	0	0	0	0	0	0	0	0	0	0
(Israel)	7	Omer Atzili	12	10	1,052	7	5	0	0	0	0	0	0	0	0	0	0	1	1	99	1	0	12	5	600	2	1	25	16	1,751	10	6
(Israel)	8	Dolev Haziza	6	4	421	0	0	0	0	0	0	0	0	0	0	0	0	1	1	49	0	0	9	7	717	1	6	16	12	1,187	1	6
(Suriname)	10	Tjaronn Chery	11	6	792	3	2	0	0	0	0	0	0	0	0	0	0	1	0	21	0	0	11	11	1,062	4	1	23	17	1,875	7	3
(Israel)	16	Mohammad Abu Fani	12	8	811	1	0	0	0	0	0	0	0	0	0	0	0	1	0	50	0	0	11	5	627	1	0	24	13	1,488	2	0
(Israel)	17	Suf Podgoreanu	0	0	0	0	0	0	0	0	0	0	0	0	0	0	0	0	0	0	0	0	1	0	12	0	0	1	0	12	0	0
(Israel)	23	Aviel Zargari	0	0	0	0	0	0	0	0	0	0	0	0	0	0	0	0	0	0	0	0	1	0	12	0	0	1	0	12	0	0
(Israel)	18	Goni Naor	7	1	99	0	0	2	2	135	0	0	0	0	0	0	0	0	0	0	0	0	1	0	0	0	0	9	3	234	0	0
(Israel)	97	Alon Deri	0	0	0	0	0	0	0	0	0	0	0	0	0	0	0	0	0	0	0	0	0	0	0	0	0	0	0	0	0	0
(Israel)	98	Kabba Sonko	0	0	0	0	0	0	0	0	0	0	0	0	0	0	0	0	0	0	0	0	0	0	0	0	0	0	0	0	0	0
(Israel)	26	Mahmoud Jaber	14	4	485	0	1	1	1	96	0	0	0	0	0	0	0	1	1	45	0	0	0	0	0	0	0	16	1	626	0	1
(Israel)	35	Bassam Zarora	1	0	2	0	0	0	0	0	0	0	0	0	0	0	0	0	0	0	0	0	0	0	0	0	0	1	0	2	0	0
(Israel)	94	Dolev Bura	0	0	0	0	0	0	0	0	0	0	0	0	0	0	0	0	0	0	0	0	0	0	0	0	0	0	0	0	0	0
Forwards
(Haiti)	9	Frantzdy Pierrot	12	8	901	5	0	0	0	0	0	0	0	0	0	0	0	1	0	35	0	0	12	11	986	5	2	25	19	1,922	10	0
(Republic of the Congo)	11	Mavis Tchibota	10	4	349	0	2	0	0	0	0	0	0	0	0	0	0	0	0	0	0	0	5	1	122	0	0	15	5	471	0	2
(Australia)	13	Nikita Rukavytsya	8	4	282	0	0	0	0	0	0	0	0	0	0	0	0	1	1	65	0	0	11	0	161	0	0	20	5	508	0	0
(Israel)	14	Ben Sahar	0	0	0	0	0	0	0	0	0	0	1	0	45	0	0	0	0	0	0	0	0	0	0	0	0	1	0	45	0	0
(Israel)	95	Sapir Razon	0	0	0	0	0	0	0	0	0	0	0	0	0	0	0	0	0	0	0	0	0	0	0	0	0	0	0	0	0	0
(Israel)	96	Anan Khalaily	0	0	0	0	0	1	0	1	0	0	0	0	0	0	0	0	0	0	0	0	0	0	0	0	0	1	0	1	0	0
(Israel)	91	Dia Saba	0	0	0	0	0	0	0	0	0	0	0	0	0	0	0	0	0	0	0	0	0	0	0	0	0	0	0	0	0	0
(Israel)	21	Dean David	12	8	748	2	0	0	0	0	0	0	0	0	0	0	0	1	0	0	50	0	12	9	709	1	0	25	17	1,500	3	1
Players who have made an appearance this season but have left the club
(Serbia)	5	Bogdan Planić	0	0	0	0	0	0	0	0	0	0	0	0	0	0	0	1	1	99	0	0	6	6	595	0	0	7	7	694	0	0
(Israel)	33	Maor Levi	5	4	228	0	0	0	0	0	0	0	0	0	0	0	0	0	0	0	0	0	1	0	19	0	0	6	4	247	0	0
(Israel)	15	Ofri Arad	4	2	250	0	1	0	0	0	0	0	0	0	0	0	0	0	0	0	0	0	4	1	93	0	0	8	3	343	0	1
(Israel)	6	Neta Lavi	11	11	949	0	1	0	0	0	0	0	0	0	0	0	0	1	1	78	0	0	12	11	1,068	0	0	24	23	2,095	0	1

=== Goals ===
Rank	Player	Position	Ligat HaAl	State Cup	Toto Cup	Super Cup	UCL	Total
1	(Israel) Omer Atzili	MF	21	1	1	1	2	26
2	(Suriname) Tjaronn Chery	MF	10	0	1	0	4	15
3	(Israel) Dean David	FW	10	2	1	0	1	14
3	(Haiti) Frantzdy Pierrot	FW	9	0	0	0	5	14
5	(Israel) Mohammad Abu Fani	MF	4	2	0	0	1	7
6	(Israel) Dia Saba	FW	5	1	0	0	0	7
5	(Senegal) Abdoulaye Seck	DF	3	1	0	0	2	6
8	(Israel) Dolev Haziza	MF	2	0	0	0	1	3
9	(France) Dylan Batubinsika	DF	2	0	0	0	0	2
9	(Niger) Ali Mohamed	MF	0	0	0	0	2	2
11	(Israel) Sean Goldberg	DF	1	0	0	0	0	1
11	(Israel) Rami Gershon	DF	1	0	0	0	0	1
11	(Israel) (Australia) Nikita Rukavytsya	FW	1	0	0	0	0	1
11	(Israel) (Republic of the Congo) Mavis Tchibota	FW	0	1	0	0	0	1
11	(Sweden) Daniel Sundgren	DF	0	0	0	0	1	1
11	(Israel) Ofri Arad	DF	0	0	1	0	0	1
11	(Israel) Neta Lavi	MF	0	1	0	0	0	1
Own goals			4	0	0	0	2	6

=== Clean sheets ===
Rank	Pos.	No.	Name	Ligat HaAl	State Cup	Toto Cup	Super Cup	UCL	Total
1	GK	44	(United States) (Israel) Josh Cohen	8				3	11
2	GK	90	(Israel) Roi Mishpati	4	1				5

=== Disciplinary record for Ligat Ha'Al and State Cup ===
No.	Pos	Nat	Name	Ligat Ha'Al			State Cup			Total		
No.	Pos	Nat	Name	Booked	(yellow card) (yellow-red card)	Sent off (straight red)	Booked	(yellow card) (yellow-red card)	Sent off (straight red)	Booked	(yellow card) (yellow-red card)	Sent off (straight red)
16	MF	(Israel)	Mohammad Abu Fani	10	1					10	1	
2	DF	(Sweden)	Daniel Sundgren	8			1			9		
18	MF	(Israel)	Goni Naor	6						6		
27	DF	(France)	Pierre Cornud	8						8		
8	MF	(Israel)	Dolev Haziza	6						6		
7	MF	(Israel)	Omer Atzili	6						6		
11	FW	(Republic of the Congo) (Israel)	Mavis Tchibota	3			2			5		
30	DF	(Senegal)	Abdoulaye Seck	5						5		
19	DF	(France)	Dylan Batubinsika	4		1				4		1
3	DF	(Israel)	Sean Goldberg	3						3		
23	MF	(Israel)	Aviel Zargary	3						3		
21	FW	(Israel)	Dean David	2			1			3		
10	MF	(Suriname)	Tjaronn Chery	3						3		
12	DF	(Israel)	Sun Menahem	2						2		
90	GK	(Israel)	Roi Mishpati	2						2		
9	FW	(Haiti)	Frantzdy Pierrot	2						2		
35	MF	(Israel)	Bassam Zarora	2						2		
55	DF	(Israel)	Rami Gershon	1			1			2		
44	GK	(United States) (Israel)	Josh Cohen	1						1		
22	DF	(Israel)	Raz Meir	1						1		
4	MF	(Niger)	Ali Mohamed	2						2		
40	GK	(Israel)	Shareef Kayouf	1						1		
91	FW	(Israel)	Dia Saba	1						1		
13	FW	(Israel)	Nikita Rukavytsya	1						1		
36	DF	(Israel)	Inon Eliyahu			1						1
Players who have made an appearance this season but have left the club
6	MF	(Israel)	Neta Lavi	3						3		
33	MF	(Israel)	Maor Levi	1			1			2		

=== Disciplinary record for UEFA Champions League ===
No.	Pos	Nat	Name	Qualification			Group stage			Total		
No.	Pos	Nat	Name	Booked	(yellow card) (yellow-red card)	Sent off (straight red)	Booked	(yellow card) (yellow-red card)	Sent off (straight red)	Booked	(yellow card) (yellow-red card)	Sent off (straight red)
8	MF	(Israel)	Dolev Haziza	3			1			4		
7	MF	(Israel)	Omer Atzili				3			3		
2	DF	(Sweden)	Daniel Sundgren	3						3		
16	FW	(Israel)	Mohammad Abu Fani	2			1			3		
12	DF	(Israel)	Sun Menahem	2			1			3		
27	DF	(France)	Pierre Cornud	1			1			2		
30	DF	(Senegal)	Abdoulaye Seck				2			2		
9	FW	(Haiti)	Frantzdy Pierrot				1			1		
11	FW	(Republic of the Congo)	Mavis Tchibota				1			1		
10	MF	(Suriname)	Tjaronn Chery				1			1		
4	MF	(Niger)	Ali Mohamed	1						1		
44	GK	(United States) (Israel)	Josh Cohen	1						1		
Players who have made an appearance this season but have left the club
6	MF	(Israel)	Neta Lavi				2			2		
5	DF	(Serbia)	Bogdan Planić	1						1		

=== Current Suspensions ===
Player	Date Received	Offence	Length of suspension		
(Israel) Bassam Zarora	1 May 2023	Discipline vs Hapoel Be'er Sheva (A)	15 Matches	Maccabi Tel Aviv (H); Maccabi Netanya (A); Hapoel Jerusalem (H) and 12 From the next season	1 May 2023; ~1 Jan 2024
(Israel) Inon Eliyahu	1 May 2023	Discipline vs Hapoel Be'er Sheva (A)	3 Matches	Maccabi Tel Aviv (H); Maccabi Netanya (A); Hapoel Jerusalem (H)	1 May 2023; 21 May 2023

=== Penalties ===
Date	Penalty Taker	Scored	Opponent	Competition
23 August 2022	(Israel) Dolev Haziza	No	Red Star Belgrade	Champions League
27 August 2022	(Israel) Omer Atzili	Yes	Maccabi Netanya	Ligat Ha`Al
3 September 2022	(Israel) Omer Atzili	Yes	Hapoel Be'er Sheva	Ligat Ha`Al
2 November 2022	(Suriname) Tjaronn Chery	Yes	Benfica	Champions League
6 November 2022	(Israel) Omer Atzili	Yes	Beitar Jerusalem	Ligat Ha`Al
19 December 2022	(Israel) Omer Atzili	Yes	Bnei Sakhnin	Ligat Ha`Al
8 January 2023	(Israel) Omer Atzili	Yes	Sektzia Ness Ziona	Ligat Ha`Al
25 February 2023	(Israel) Omer Atzili	No	Beitar Jerusalem	Ligat Ha`Al
18 March 2023	(Israel) Omer Atzili	Yes	F.C. Ashdod	Ligat Ha`Al
18 March 2023	(Israel) Omer Atzili	Yes	F.C. Ashdod	Ligat Ha`Al
23 March 2023	(Israel) Omer Atzili	Yes	F.C. Ashdod	Ligat Ha`Al
15 May 2023	(Haiti) Frantzdy Pierrot	No	Maccabi Netanya	Ligat Ha`Al

=== Overall ===
	Total	Home	Away
Games played	54	28	28
Games won	34	22	12
Games drawn	7	2	5
Games lost	13	4	9
Biggest win	5–0 vs Hapoel Jerusalem	5–0 vs Hapoel Jerusalem	4–0 vs Olympiacos; 5–1 vs Maccabi Netanya
Biggest loss	2–7 vs Paris Saint-Germain; 1–6 vs Benfica	1–6 vs Benfica	2–7 vs Paris Saint-Germain
Biggest win (League)	5–0 vs Hapoel Jerusalem	5–0 vs Hapoel Jerusalem	5–1 vs Maccabi Netanya
Biggest loss (League)	0–3 vs Hapoel Jerusalem; 0–3 vs Maccabi Tel Aviv	—	0–3 vs Hapoel Jerusalem; 0–3 vs Maccabi Tel Aviv
Biggest win (Cup)	5–1 vs Hapoel Haifa	5–1 vs Hapoel Haifa	1–0 vs Hapoel Nof HaGalil
Biggest loss (Cup)	1–2 vs Maccabi Netanya	1–2 vs Maccabi Netanya	—
Biggest win (Toto)	4–1 vs Bnei Sakhnin	4–1 vs Bnei Sakhnin	—
Biggest loss (Toto)	—	—	—
Biggest win (Europe)	4–0 vs Olympiacos; 4–0 vs Apollon Limassol	4–0 vs Apollon Limassol	4–0 vs Olympiacos
Biggest loss (Europe)	2–7 vs Paris Saint-Germain; 1–6 vs Benfica	1–6 vs Benfica	2–7 vs Paris Saint-Germain
Goals scored	111	71	40
Goals conceded	69	29	40
Goal difference	+42	+42	—
Clean sheets	14	8	6
Average GF per game	2.06	2.54	1.54
Average GA per game	1.28	1.04	1.54
Yellow cards	114	54	60
Red cards	3	1	2
Most appearances			
Most minutes played			
Most goals	Omer Atzili (26)		
Most Assist			
Penalties for	12	6	6
Penalties scored	9	5	4
Penalties against	8	7	1
Penalties saved	3	3	0
