= Yerida =

Emigration by Israeli Jews from Israel

Yerida (Hebrew: ירידה, lit. 'descent') is emigration by Israeli Jews from the State of Israel (or in religious texts, Land of Israel). Yerida is the opposite of aliyah (עליה, 'ascent'), which is immigration of Jews to Israel. Zionists are generally critical of the act of yerida and the term has traditionally carried a negative connotation. The term applies specifically to Jewish emigrants and does not include the emigration of non-Jewish Israeli citizens.

According to a 2025 report by the Institute for Jewish Policy Research, 630,000 Israeli citizens live abroad, of whom roughly half were born abroad. Another 325,000 people outside Israel have at least one Israeli parent. Reasons commonly cited for emigration include the high cost of living, a desire to escape from the Israeli–Palestinian conflict, academic or professional opportunities abroad, and dissatisfaction with Israeli society. In 2024 and 2025, Israel experienced net negative migration: yerida was higher than aliyah.

== Etymology ==
Jewish emigrants from Israel are known as yor(e)dim (Hebrew: יורדים), meaning "those who go down [from Israel]", while Jewish immigrants to Israel are known as olim (Hebrew: עולים), meaning "those who go up [to Israel]". The terminology reflects a longstanding metaphor in Hebrew sources that associates movement toward the Land of Israel with ascent and movement away from it with descent.

The use of the term yored is a modern application of language found in biblical and rabbinic texts. In the Torah, similar phrasing appears in passages such as Genesis 46:4 ("I will go down with you to Egypt, and I will also bring you up again", אנכי ארד עמך מצרימה ואנכי אעלך גם עלו) and Genesis 12:10 ("Now there was a famine in the land, and Abram went down to Egypt to live there because the famine was severe", "ויהי רעב בארץ; וירד אברם מצרימה לגור שם כי-כבד הרעב בארץ") Related concepts appear in rabbinic literature, including the Mishnah’s statement that "all may compel [a spouse] to go up to the Land of Israel, but not all may compel [a spouse] to leave it" ("הכל מעלין לארץ ישראל ואין הכל מוציאין") and the Talmudic assertion that "the Land of Israel is higher than all other lands" ("ארץ ישראל גבוה מכל ארצות").

In the biblical narrative, Abraham is described as the first figure to "go down" from the land of Israel, followed later by Joseph and Jacob in the context of their migration to Egypt in Genesis. Rabbinic interpretation later developed the concept of yerida letzorekh aliyah (Hebrew: ירידה לצורך עלייה, "descent for the purpose of ascent"), a concept similar to the contemporary expression of hitting "rock bottom".

== Jewish law ==
Jewish law (halakha) addresses emigration from the Land of Israel and sets out circumstances under which departure is permitted. According to Maimonides, permanent emigration and resettlement outside the land is permitted primarily in cases of severe famine. Joseph Trani ruled that departure from the Land of Israel may also be permitted for purposes such as marriage, Torah study, or earning a livelihood, including in situations where famine is not present.

In traditional and Orthodox Jewish legal thought, residence in the Land of Israel is generally regarded as a religious value. Emigration or even temporary departure is not thought of as a worthy act for a man.

== History ==
Estimating the scale of Jewish emigration from Palestine between the beginning of the Zionist movement in the 1880s and the establishment of the State of Israel in 1948 is difficult, as is determining the proportion of emigrants relative to settlers. Estimates of emigration during the period of early Zionist settlement, including the First Aliyah (1881–1903) and the Second Aliyah (1904–1914), range from approximately 40% of immigrants, according to an estimate by Joshua Kaniel, to as high as 80–90%. David Ben-Gurion estimated that "90% of the Second Aliyah despaired of the country and left”. Although precise figures are unavailable, historical accounts indicate that many European Jewish settlers during this period left after less than a year, often due to hardship, hunger, and disease.

During the latter part of the Fourth Aliyah, during 1926–1928, Mandatory Palestine authorities recorded 17,972 Jewish immigrants, while the Jewish Agency estimated that approximately 1,100 additional immigrants were not officially registered. In the same period, authorities recorded 14,607 Jewish emigrants. It is estimated that about 60,000 Jews emigrated from Mandatory Palestine between 1923 and 1948, and that approximately 90,000 Jews emigrated from the beginning of the Zionist movement until the establishment of the State of Israel.

Following the establishment of the State of Israel in 1948, the country experienced a period of mass Jewish settlement between 1948 and 1951, primarily from Europe and from Arab and Muslim countries. During this period, Israel absorbed approximately 688,000 immigrants. In subsequent years, an estimated 10% of these immigrants left the country, primarily emigrating to Canada, Australia, and South America. A smaller number emigrated to the United States; contemporary assessments suggested that the United States might have received a larger share had immigration restrictions imposed by the U.S. Immigration Act of 1924 not remained in effect.

By 1953, immigration levels had stabilized while emigration increased. Early post-state emigration consisted largely of immigrants dissatisfied with living conditions in Israel. From the mid-1970s onward, an increasing number of native-born Israelis also emigrated.

Between 1948 and 1961, Israeli citizens were required to obtain both a passport and an exit visa to travel abroad, including for temporary travel. This policy was intended to prevent the departure of Jews who were expected to be fighting in the Israel Defense Forces, along with a perception that Jews emigrating harmed national solidarity. Additional restrictions were imposed on foreign currency transfers, including requirements that airline tickets be purchased using funds sent from abroad. The exit visa requirement was abolished in 1961 following court rulings and decisions by the Knesset, and further restrictions were eased after the Six-Day War, although administrative barriers to emigration remained.

In 1980, Deputy Prime Minister Simha Erlich and Director of the Jewish Agency Shmuel Lahis commissioned a study of Israeli emigration to the United States. The resulting Lahis Report estimated that between 300,000 and 500,000 Israelis were living in the United States, primarily in New York City and Los Angeles. In 1982, Deputy Minister Dov Shilansky, who oversaw efforts to limit yerida, stated that approximately 300,000 Israelis had emigrated since 1948, citing housing shortages and unemployment as primary contributing factors.

Yerida increased significantly in the mid-1980s, associated with the aftermath of the 1982 Lebanon War, increased exposure to opportunities abroad, and economic instability following the 1983 Israel bank stock crisis. In 1984 and 1985, the number of Jewish emigrants exceeded the number of immigrants to Israel. During this period, Israeli officials and public institutions frequently cited figures suggesting that several hundred thousand Israelis were living abroad. Some of these estimates were later questioned. According to demographer Pini Herman, an Israeli government statistician responsible for tracking emigration data reported that fewer than 400,000 Israelis had emigrated since 1948 without returning, and stated that higher figures cited by other agencies had not been based on data from his bureau.

In 2003, Israel's Ministry of Immigration and Absorption estimated that approximately 750,000 Israelis were living abroad, primarily in the United States and Canada, representing about 12.5 percent of Israel’s Jewish population. In 2008, the ministry revised its estimate to approximately 700,000 Israelis living abroad, including about 450,000 in the United States and Canada and an estimated 50,000 to 70,000 in the United Kingdom.

In 2012, the Global Religion and Migration Database compiled by the Pew Research Center estimated that approximately 330,000 native-born Israelis, including about 230,000 Jews, were living abroad, representing roughly 4% of Israel’s native-born Jewish population. This figure did not include immigrants to Israel who later emigrated. That same year, Danny Gadot of the Israeli consulate in Los Angeles stated that many Israelis counted in overseas population estimates were not native-born Israelis but rather children of Israeli expatriates, who are registered as Israeli citizens if born abroad. In the same period, Israel National News reported that yerida had reached its lowest level in four decades, while the number of Israelis returning from abroad had increased.

== Demography ==
Between 1948 and 1958, more than 100,000 Jews emigrated from Israel. Analysis of Israel’s net international migration balance and total immigration between 1948 and 1994 indicates a long-term migration retention rate of approximately 80%, implying that emigrants constituted about 20% of total immigrants during this period. This retention rate is higher than that of other major immigration-receiving countries such as the United States, Argentina, Brazil, Australia, and New Zealand.

In 2000, Sergio Della Pergola attributed Israel's comparatively high migration retention to two primary factors. One is the family-based character of aliyah, which often involved the relocation of entire households, including children and elderly family members, thereby reducing the likelihood of return migration. The second factor was the limited feasibility of returning to countries of origin where discrimination or persecution had been among the principal reasons for emigration.

According to the Pew Research Center’s Global Religion and Migration Database, in 2012 the estimated number of Israeli-born Jewish international migrants originating from Israel was approximately 230,000. In 2014, estimates suggested that more than 100,000 Israeli citizens were living in Russia. Israeli cultural events and institutions serve the Russian-Israeli population, including cultural centers located in Moscow, Saint Petersburg, Novosibirsk and Yekaterinburg, and some members of this population divide their time between Israel and Russia.

Available evidence indicates that the United States has been the primary destination for Israeli emigrants. In 1982, demographer Pini Herman estimated that approximately 100,000 Israeli emigrants resided in the United States, about half of them in the New York metropolitan area and an additional 10,000–12,000 in Greater Los Angeles. The relative stability of the New York Israeli population was supported by a 2009 study for the UJA Federation of New York by Steven M. Cohen and Judith Veinstein, which estimated that approximately 41,000 Israeli immigrants lived in New York. Cohen and Haberfield estimated that in 1990 there were between 110,000 and 130,000 Israeli immigrants in the United States.

Data from the United States Department of Homeland Security indicate that between 1949 and 2015, approximately 250,000 Israelis obtained permanent residency in the United States, although these figures do not account for subsequent return migration to Israel. The 1990 United States census recorded 94,718 persons born in Israel/Palestine living in the United States, increasing to 125,325 in the 2000 United States census. The 1990 National Jewish Population Survey, defining Israelis as Jews born in Israel, estimated 63,000 Israeli-born adult Jews living in the United States, with an additional 30,000 children residing in their households. Of these children, approximately 7,000 were born before their parents emigrated, yielding an estimated Israeli-born Jewish population of about 70,000 adults and 23,000 U.S.-born children of Israeli immigrants.

The 2010 United States Census reported 140,323 persons born in Israel, representing a 30 percent increase from 2000. Of these, approximately two-thirds held U.S. citizenship. Estimates of American Jews who immigrated to Israel, later returned to the United States, and retained Israeli citizenship vary, ranging from 30,000–60,000 by 1990 and 53,000–75,000 by 2000. Combining Israeli-born individuals and those who lived in Israel for extended periods, estimates place the total number of Israeli Jews residing in the United States in 2000 between 153,000 and 175,000. Yinon Cohen estimated that in 2000 the total number of Israeli Jews living outside Israel worldwide was between 300,000 and 350,000.

The Israel Central Bureau of Statistics (CBS) defines "Israelis who left the country" as individuals who lived abroad continuously for more than one year, after having lived in Israel for at least 90 consecutive days. During the 1950s, 1960s, and early 1970s, the CBS published emigration figures in its Statistical Abstract; this practice was later discontinued; this avoided conflict with other Israeli government entities who cited much larger numbers of emigrants than the CBS published estimates. Subsequent emigration estimates have been inferred from CBS population projections. Between 1990 and 2005, CBS emigration assumptions averaged approximately 14,000 persons per year, with higher levels observed in 1993, 1995, and 2001–2002. During this period, the emigration rate declined from approximately 3 per thousand to 1 per thousand, reflecting population growth. These estimates include emigrants who are Palestinian citizens of Israel and Israelis who died while abroad.

Using border control data, the CBS calculated a "gross balance" of approximately 581,000 Israelis living abroad between 1948 and 1992, defined as the excess of departures over returns by Israeli residents. About half of those leaving Israel reported the United States as their destination, yielding an estimated gross balance of 290,500 Israelis residing in the United States. Based on Israeli data, Zvi Eisenbach estimated that approximately 74% of American Israelis were Jewish, adjusting the estimated gross balance of Israeli Jews in the United States to about 216,000. Subsequent adjustments accounting for mortality and return migration produced lower estimates.

The OECD calculated Israel's expatriate rate at 2.9 per thousand in 2005, placing Israel in the mid-range among 175 countries examined. Census and survey data indicate that a substantial proportion of individuals identifying as Israeli in the United States are U.S.-born children of Israeli emigrants, many of whom have never lived in Israel but are Israeli citizens under Israeli law. The 2000 United States Census recorded approximately 107,000 persons reporting Israeli ancestry, with about half born in Israel/Palestine and a 39% born in the United States.

Data from U.S. immigration regularization programs in the early 1990s indicate relatively low levels of undocumented Israeli migration. Between 2005 and 2012, 116 Israeli citizens were granted asylum in the United States out of 405 applications; reported cases included Palestinian citizens of Israel, immigrants from the former Soviet Union, and members of Haredi Jewish communities.

The Israel Central Bureau of Statistics estimates that between 1948 and 2015, approximately 720,000 Israelis emigrated and did not return to live in Israel. In 2017, the CBS estimated that between 557,000 and 593,000 Israelis, excluding children born abroad to Israeli emigrants, were residing outside the country.

== Reasons for emigration phenomenon ==
The primary motives cited for emigration from Israel are commonly related to the pursuit of higher living standards, employment opportunities, professional advancement, and access to higher education. From the early 1980s, emigration from Israel increased in the context of social, economic, cultural, and political changes within the country.

Studies of Israeli migration to specific destinations illustrate these patterns. Research on Israeli migration to Berlin identified several commonly cited factors, including dissatisfaction with life in Israel, opportunities for career and academic development, relocation connected to a spouse or partnership (including marriage to a German citizen), and Berlin’s relatively low cost of living combined with its cultural diversity.

A study by Omer Moav and Arik Gold examining emigration from Israel between 1995 and 2005 found that emigration rates were significantly higher among individuals with higher education than among those with only compulsory education. Concerns regarding the emigration of highly educated individuals have led to initiatives aimed at encouraging the return of Israeli scientists and researchers, with participants citing limited research funding, grant availability, and employment conditions in Israel compared with opportunities abroad.

Survey data indicate that political conditions and security concerns are not typically identified as the primary factors motivating emigration. Emigration is also observed among new immigrants to Israel who do not successfully integrate into Israeli society, particularly those who encounter difficulties acquiring Hebrew proficiency, entering the labor market, or who have previously experienced major residential transitions. Some of these individuals relocate to third countries, most often in the Western world, while others return to their countries of origin. Return migration to countries of origin has been observed to increase when conditions there improve, as occurred in the post-Soviet states during the first decade of the 21st century.

Since the establishment of the State of Israel in 1948, surveys have consistently shown that emigrants have, on average, higher levels of education than those who remain in the country. This pattern is more pronounced among immigrants who later leave Israel than among native-born Israelis. As a result, emigration from Israel has frequently been characterized in the academic literature as human capital flight. In 2008, the OECD estimated Israel’s rate of emigration among the highly educated was estimated at 5.3 per thousand, placing it in the lower third of OECD countries and below the OECD average of 14 per thousand. Comparative analyses indicate that Israel retains a higher proportion of its highly educated population than several developed countries, including Belgium, the Netherlands, Finland, Denmark and New Zealand.

Academic and professional emigration has been identified as a contributing factor to the phenomenon of yerida in recent years. A 2024 state report, based on data from the Israel Central Bureau of Statistics and cited by The Times of Israel, found that approximately 12% of Israeli citizens holding doctoral degrees were living abroad in the previous year. Media analyses have noted that a significant proportion of highly educated Israelis, particularly those in academic and research fields, reside outside the country for extended periods. Some commentators have expressed concern that this trend may have long-term implications for Israel’s scientific and research capacity, especially in fields such as mathematics and the natural sciences.

=== Circular migration ===
Although emigration from Israel has often been described as unidirectional, research indicates the presence of substantial return migration (hazara, Hebrew: חזרה), defined as return to Israel after extended residence abroad, typically of at least one year. Many Israelis who emigrate eventually return after prolonged periods overseas, and this pattern of circular migration appears to be particularly common among highly skilled and highly educated individuals and their families.

In 2007, Israel's Ministry of Immigrant Absorption introduced a program designed to encourage the return of Israeli emigrants. By 2008, the ministry allocated approximately 19 million shekels to support reintegration initiatives for returning residents. Prior to the program, approximately 4,000 Israeli expatriates returned annually; the number increased thereafter, doubling within several years. Returns peaked at approximately 11,000 in 2010. The Jerusalem Post reported that 22,470 Israelis returned to Israel between 2010 and October 2012.

Israeli law grants the status of toshav hozer (Hebrew: תושב חוזר, "returning resident") to Israeli citizens who have resided abroad for at least two years (or 1.5 years for students), have not visited Israel for more than 120 days per year, and have not previously exercised benefits associated with this status.

In 2012, demographer Pini Herman described circular migration as having economic significance for Israel, noting that extended periods of employment abroad by highly skilled Israelis have been followed by return migration associated with the transfer of professional experience, expertise, and international business connections. Upon returning, some individuals have contributed to the development of research and industrial infrastructure in Israel, including activities linked to multinational technology companies.

== Emigration and Zionist ideology ==
Opposition to emigration from Israel is a foundational assumption of Zionism, deriving from the concept known as the "Negation of the Diaspora", which emphasizes Jewish settlement in the Land of Israel as a normative ideal. In 1996, Eliezer Schweid wrote that this principle was a central component of Zionist education in Israel until the 1970s, after which Israeli society increasingly acknowledged the continued existence of the Jewish diaspora and its substantial political, financial, and cultural support for Israel following the Six-Day War.

Yerida has been interpreted as reflecting tensions within Zionism. Some commentators have characterized emigration as evidence of the movement’s shortcomings, while others have interpreted it as an outcome of Israel’s normalization as a state whose citizens exercise mobility comparable to that of other developed societies. When asked about it in an interview, poet Irit Katz expressed the view that the ability of Israeli Jews to emigrate without perceiving it as a betrayal reflects Israel’s consolidation as a "stable" and "ordinary" nation-state.

== Attitudes in Israeli society ==
During the early waves of Jewish settlement, emigration from Israel was widely regarded as a source of concern regarding the viability of the Zionist project. In a 1976 interview, then-Israeli Prime Minister Yitzhak Rabin referred to Israeli emigrants as the "scum of weaklings" (Hebrew: נפולת של נמושות), reflecting the prevailing attitudes of the period. In subsequent decades, public discourse in Israel has shown a decline in overt antagonism toward emigrants. Earlier debates focused particularly on the emigration of native-born Israelis, whose departure was perceived as more problematic than that of recent immigrants who had struggled to integrate. Over time, the discussion shifted toward broader considerations of mobility and quality of life.

In a 2008 interview, Ehud Barak stated that while Jews have the ability to adapt globally, Israel faces the challenge of maintaining sufficient attractiveness in areas such as science, education, culture, and quality of life to encourage both native-born Israelis and members of the Jewish diaspora to reside in the country.

Attitudes toward emigration are also reflected in patterns of citizenship acquisition. A relatively high number of Israelis have sought or obtained citizenship in European Union countries, often based on parental or grandparental nationality. In 2007, it was estimated that approximately 42 percent of Israelis were eligible for European Union citizenship, and more than 4,000 Israelis acquired German citizenship that year, a 50 percent increase over 2005. A survey conducted in the early 2000s by the Menachem Begin Heritage Center reported that 59% of respondents had approached or intended to approach a foreign embassy to inquire about obtaining foreign citizenship or a passport, often as a precautionary measure rather than with the intention of emigrating.

Israeli law permits dual or multiple citizenship for Jews. Between 1966 and 1979, 220 Israeli diplomats serving in the United States obtained U.S. permanent resident status.

Survey data suggest varying levels of interest in emigration among Israelis. The 2007 Gallup World Poll found that approximately 20% of Israelis expressed a preference to move permanently to another country if given the opportunity, placing Israel in the mid-range among surveyed countries. Measures of self-reported quality of life from the same period showed that Israelis rated their lives relatively highly. Younger age groups have reported higher levels of interest in living abroad. In 2007, nearly half of Israelis aged 14–18 indicated a desire to live outside Israel, and 68 percent described the country’s general situation as "not good".

Sociological research has noted shifts in Israeli attitudes toward the diaspora and migration. In 2009, Hebrew University sociologist Vered Vinitzky-Seroussi observed that increased Israeli mobility complicates traditional distinctions between Israelis and diaspora Jews. That same year, Haifa University sociologist Oz Almog commented on changing perceptions of immigration to Israel from countries without widespread persecution, suggesting a growing skepticism toward such migration.

In 2007, Avraham Burg questioned the exclusive centrality of Israel in Jewish identity, arguing that Jewish life has historically been characterized by multiple geographic centers and that residence outside Israel can be viewed as legitimate within that context.

== Emigration and Israeli politics ==
Yerida has been a recurring theme in Israeli political discourse and election campaigns, with political parties arguing that rival policies may increase emigration or that their own platforms could reduce it. Some parties have included policies addressing emigration in their election manifestos, and governing coalitions have at times assigned a minister or deputy minister to address the issue. Proposed legislation in the Knesset has frequently been debated in terms of its potential effects on emigration from Israel.

Emigration has also appeared in the context of political protest. Participants in Israeli protest movements, particularly following wars or in response to economic and ethnic inequality, have at times threatened to emigrate as a form of dissent, occasionally staging symbolic acts such as the public destruction of identity documents. In the 1970s, a member of the Israeli Black Panthers movement emigrated to Morocco during protests for ethnic equality, attracting media attention, and later returned to Israel.

In 1998, Janet Aviad, a leader of Peace Now, noted, "As soon as our people hear Bibi [Benjamin Netanyahu], they turn off the radio. They have gone on 'inner yerida'."

In 2008, amid declining and historically low aliyah figures and broader debates over Israeli identity, the Ministry of Immigrant Absorption expanded its outreach to include Israeli emigrants, framing them as part of an "Israeli diaspora" alongside the Jewish diaspora. The initiative, titled "Returning Home on Israel’s 60th", aimed to encourage former residents to return. The policy prompted debate over whether the ministry’s mandate should extend to returning Israelis, with the ministry arguing that no other governmental body addressed this issue.

In 2009, a Knesset bill supported by Benjamin Netanyahu proposed granting voting rights to Israeli citizens living abroad. The bill did not pass.

Following the 2014 Gaza War, the song "Berlin" by the Israeli band Shmemel gained prominence as a protest song addressing emigration from Israel, with lyrics and visual elements referencing alternatives to residence in the country.

In the 2020s, Israeli public discourse has increasingly adopted the term "relocation" in place of yerida, particularly in response to political developments following the return to power of Prime Minister Benjamin Netanyahu and the formation of a right-wing coalition government. This terminology is also used in discussions of remote work and temporary residence abroad.

== Reaction of Jewish diaspora communities ==
In 1991, Joseph Telushkin observed that ambivalence toward yordim persisted within the American Jewish community, noting that Israeli emigrants who were largely secular often avoided participation in established Jewish communal institutions and tended to maintain social networks primarily with other Israelis.

In 2008, journalist Rob Eshman wrote that Israeli emigrants were sometimes treated by local Jewish communities as marginal participants, a reception he described as being consistent with prevailing attitudes in Israel itself. Within some segments of diaspora Jewry, providing organized support services to Israeli emigrants was viewed as potentially conflicting with Zionist principles that emphasize immigration to Israel and the consolidation of the world's Jewish population in Israel. In this context, Israeli authorities at times discouraged diaspora Jewish organizations from offering targeted services to Israeli emigrants, based on concerns that such support might facilitate long-term settlement abroad.

At the same time, Israeli emigrants have contributed to diaspora Jewish communities through demographic growth and cultural presence. Periods of increased return migration to Israel have also been noted by Jewish media outlets, including during the Great Recession, when economic conditions influenced mobility decisions.

Debates over yerida have surfaced in specific diaspora communities. In Teaneck, New Jersey, for example, arguments in the 2000s centered on the growing visibility of Israeli emigrants and their involvement in local institutions. Because immigration to Israel is publicly celebrated in the township’s Jewish community, some residents opposed recognizing or honoring Israelis who had moved from Israel to Teaneck. Critics argued that such emigration undermined religious-Zionist educational goals and that placing Israeli emigrants in leadership roles in synagogues and schools conflicted with those principles.

Some diaspora Jewish communities have also characterized Israeli emigrants as less involved in local Jewish organizational life, contributing less financially than long-established community members, and being employed in service-sector roles less commonly held by local Jews. Former Israeli Prime Minister Golda Meir alluded to this phenomenon in a recollection of an encounter with an Israeli working as a waiter in New York.

== Israeli emigrants in the Diaspora ==
=== Australia ===
About 7,000 Israelis live in Australia. They are heavily concentrated in Sydney and Melbourne.

=== Canada ===
The 2006 Canadian quinquennial census counted 26,215 persons who reported Israeli citizenship, of whom two-thirds (67 percent) lived in the Ontario region. A 2009 study by the University of British Columbia concluded that there were 45,000 Israelis living in Canada, while other estimates put the figure at 60,000. Of them, about 26,000 were found to live in the Vancouver Metropolitan Area. Overall, Israeli expatriates were estimated to make up 14% of Canadian Jewry.

=== Germany ===
Between 8,000 and 15,000 Israeli expatriates live in Germany. Practically all of them reside in Berlin.

Both the Jewish and Israeli community in Germany are growing. Named Olim L'Berlin (Hebrew: עולים לברלין, progress towards Berlin) 2014 a Facebook website coined a snowclone and the so-called 'pudding or milky protest' in Israel, as the prices for comparable household items in Germany are rather low in comparison. Israeli Band Shmemels' song parodying Jerusalem of Gold with the notion, 'Jacob went down to Egypt, because the rent was a third and salaries double - Reichstag of Peace, Euro and Light' grew as well famous in the context. According to Haaretz, the conflict is less about pudding prices but about the now shattered taboo of Yerida, emigrating from Israel.

The fact that Germany was chosen as the destination struck a raw nerve across the social and political spectrum, considering Israel's founding in 1948 in the wake of the Holocaust, its large population of Holocaust survivors, and the many citizens who still refuse to buy products made in Germany. Agriculture Minister Yair Shamir stated, "I pity the Israelis who no longer remember the Holocaust and abandoned Israel for a pudding".

=== Greece ===
Greece is a popular emigration destination for Israelis due to its relatively low property prices, the "Golden Visa" program (permanent residency in exchange for investing €250,000 in the Greek economy), and proximity to Israel.

=== India ===
Between 40,000 and 60,000 Israelis have either emigrated to or established long-term residency in India, and live primarily in Goa and Maharashtra. There is a small community of young Israelis in India who move after their military service. Some stay for religious reasons to help local Jews.

=== Italy ===
Israelis frequently visit Italy for education, work, tourism, and scientific and artistic exchanges. In the last ten years 105 books of Italian authors were translated from Italian to Hebrew. A strong community of Italqim who have made aliyah to Israel have strengthened cultural ties and promoted Italian culture in the country. The Italian Cultural Institute recently initiated and organized a series of activities in the Cultural Center of the Jews of Libyan extraction in Or Yehuda, where recently a course of the Italian language has been launched.

The two Countries signed a Cultural Agreement in Rome on 11 November 1971.

=== Romania ===
After the fall of Communism, many Israeli Jews moved to Romania, most of them as businesspeople. As of 2017, there were 3,000 Israeli-born people living in Romania. In addition, every year tens of Romanian Jews in Israel and their descendants immigrate to their country of origin.

=== Russia ===
Moscow has the largest single Israeli expatriate community in the world, with 80,000 Israeli citizenship holders living in the city as of 2014, almost all of them native Russian-speakers holding dual citizenship. Many Israeli cultural events are hosted for the community, and many live part of the year in Israel. (To cater to the Israeli community, Israeli cultural centres are located in Moscow, Saint Petersburg, Novosibirsk and Yekaterinburg.) There are 60 flights a week between Tel Aviv and Moscow.

=== United Kingdom ===
The 2001 UK census recorded 11,892 Israelis living in the United Kingdom. Most of them live in London; particularly in the densely populated Jewish area of Golders Green. It has been estimated that there are up to 70,000 people of Israeli descent in the UK.

=== United States ===
In 2009 Steven M. Cohen and Judith Veinstein found that in New York, Jewish Israeli emigrants are highly affiliated with the Jewish community even though community affiliation is low in Israel. Israelis were found to be more connected to Judaism than their American counterparts in terms of synagogue membership and attendance, kashrut observance, participation in Jewish charity events and membership in Jewish community centers, among other indicators used by the study.

In 1982, Pini Herman and David LaFontaine, in a study of Israeli emigrants in Los Angeles, found high levels of Jewish affiliation, Jewish organizational participation and concentration in Jewish neighborhoods by Israeli emigrants. Israeli emigrants who behaved in a comparatively secular manner in Israel tended to behave in a more devoutly Jewish manner in Los Angeles and Israeli emigrants who reported greater Jewish behaviors in Israel tended to engage in Jewish behaviors to a lesser degree in Los Angeles, thus both becoming more 'Americanized' in their Jewish behaviors.

Israelis tend to be disproportionately Jewishly active in their diaspora communities, creating and participating formal and informal organizations, participating in diaspora Jewish religious institutions and sending their children to Jewish education providers at a greater rate than local diaspora Jews.

In Los Angeles a Council of Israeli Community was founded in 2001. In Los Angeles an Israel Leadership Club was organized and has been active in support activities for Israel, most recently in 2008, it sponsored, with the local Jewish Federation and Israeli consulate, a concert in support for the embattled population suffering rocket attacks of Sderot, Israel where the three frontrunners for the U.S. president, Hillary Clinton, Barack Obama, and John McCain greeted the attendees by video and expressed their support for the residents of Sderot. An Israeli Business Network of Beverly Hills has existed since 1996. The Israeli-American Study Initiative (IASI), a start-up project based at the UCLA International Institute, is set out to document the lives and times of Israeli Americans—initially focusing on those in Los Angeles and eventually throughout the United States.

A variety of Hebrew language websites, newspapers and magazines are published in South Florida, New York, Los Angeles and other U.S. regions. The Israeli Channel along with two other Hebrew-language channels are available via satellite broadcast nationally in the United States. Hebrew language Israeli programming on local television was broadcast in New York and Los Angeles during the 1990s, prior to Hebrew language satellite broadcast. Live performances by Israeli artists are a regular occurrence in centers of Israeli emigrants in the U.S. and Canada with audience attendance often in the hundreds. An Israeli Independence Day Festival has taken place yearly in Los Angeles since 1990 with thousands of Israeli emigrants and American Jews.

== See also ==
- Israeli Americans
- American Jews
- Brain drain
