= Yinon (name) =

Yinon or Inon, sometimes Ynon (Hebrew: יִנּוֹן, lit. 'he shall flourish'), is a Hebrew masculine given name, also occurring as a surname. Notable people with the surname include:

== Given name ==
- Yinon Azulai (born 1979), Israeli politician
- Yinon Barda (born 1984), Israeli footballer
- Inon Barnatan (born 1979), American-Israeli pianist
- Yinon Cohen, Israeli sociologist
- Yinon Costica, Israeli entrepreneur
- Inon Eliyahu (born 1993), Israeli footballer
- Ynon Kreiz (born 1965), Israeli-American businessman
- Yinon Levi, Israeli settler and murderer
- Yinon Magal (born 1969), Israeli politician and journalist
- Inon Shampanier, director of the 2021 film Paper Spiders
- Yinon Yahel (born 1978), Israeli musician
- Inon Zur (born 1965), Israeli-American composer

== Surname ==
- Israel Yinon (1956–2015), Israeli conductor
- Maoz Inon (born 1975), Israeli tourism entrepreneur
- Oded Yinon, Israeli politician and former advisor to Ariel Sharon
