= Yinon (disambiguation) =

Yinon is a moshav in southern Israel.

Yinon may also refer to:

- Yinon (name), a Hebrew given name and surname (includes a list of people)
- The Yinon Plan, a reported Israeli political plan
