= Aviel Zargari =

Israeli footballer

Personal information
- Full name: Aviel Yosef Zargari
- Date of birth: 11 December 2002 (age 23)
- Place of birth: Jerusalem, Israel
- Height: 1.83 m (6 ft 0 in)
- Position: Defensive midfielder

Youth career
- 2010–2020: Beitar Jerusalem

Senior career*
Years	Team	Apps	(Gls)
2019–2023	Beitar Jerusalem	56	(0)
2023–2025	Maccabi Haifa	0	(0)
2023–2024	→ Maccabi Petah Tikva (loan)	13	(1)
2025	→ Hapoel Haifa (loan)	9	(0)
2025–2026	Beitar Jerusalem	5	(0)
2026	Hermannstadt	15	(0)
2026–	Dila Gori	0	(0)

International career^{‡}
2017–2018	Israel U16	2	(0)
2018–2019	Israel U17	13	(0)
2019	Israel U18	2	(0)
2021–2022	Israel U21	3	(0)
2021	Israel	2	(0)
- * Club domestic league appearances and goals as of 20 June 2026 ‡ National team caps and goals as of 9 June 2021

Aviel Yosef Zargari (Hebrew: אביאל זרגרי; born 11 December 2002) is an Israeli professional footballer who plays as a defensive midfielder.

== Early life ==
Zargari was born in Jerusalem, Israel, to a Sephardic Jewish family.

== Career ==
Zargari made his debut for Beitar Jerusalem on 22 Dec 2019 in a game against Hapoel Rishon LeZion in a state cup match of the 2019–2020 season.

== International career ==
He made his debut for Israel national football team on 9 June 2021 in a friendly against Portugal.

== Career statistics ==
=== Club ===
As of 1 June 2026

Club	Season	League			National Cup (Note: Includes Israel State Cup, Cupa României)		League Cup (Note: Includes Toto Cup)		Europe		Other		Total	
Club	Season	Division	Apps	Goals	Apps	Goals	Apps	Goals	Apps	Goals	Apps	Goals	Apps	Goals
Beitar Jerusalem	2019–20	Israeli Premier League	4	0	2	0	0	0	–		–		6	0
Beitar Jerusalem	2020–21	Israeli Premier League	24	0	2	0	1	0	0	0	–		27	0
Beitar Jerusalem	2021–22	Israeli Premier League	21	0	2	0	1	0	–		–		24	0
Beitar Jerusalem	2022–23	Israeli Premier League	7	0	2	0	5	0	–		–		14	0
Beitar Jerusalem	Total		56	0	8	0	7	0	0	0	0	0	71	0
Maccabi Haifa	2022–23	Israeli Premier League	0	0	0	0	–		–		–		0	0
Maccabi Haifa	2023–24	Israeli Premier League	–		–		0	0	0	0	0	0	0	0
Maccabi Haifa	Total		0	0	0	0	0	0	0	0	0	0	0	0
Maccabi Petah Tikva (loan)	2023–24	Israeli Premier League	13	1	1	0	0	0	–		–		14	1
Hapoel Haifa (loan)	2024–25	Israeli Premier League	9	0	–		–		–		–		9	0
Beitar Jerusalem	2025–26	Israeli Premier League	5	0	0	0	1	0	0	0	–		6	0
Hermannstadt	2025–26	Liga I	15	0	2	0	–		–		2 (Note: Appearances in Liga I promotion/relegation play-offs)	0	19	0
Career total			98	1	11	0	8	0	0	0	2	0	119	1

=== International ===
As of match played 9 June 2021.

Appearances and goals by national team and year
National team	Year	Apps	Goals
Israel
Israel	2021	2	0
Total		2	0

== Honours ==
Maccabi Haifa

- Israel Super Cup: 2023

Maccabi Petah Tikva

- Israel State Cup: 2023–24

Beitar Jerusalem

- Toto Cup: 2025–26
