= Guy Badash =

Israeli footballer (born 1994)

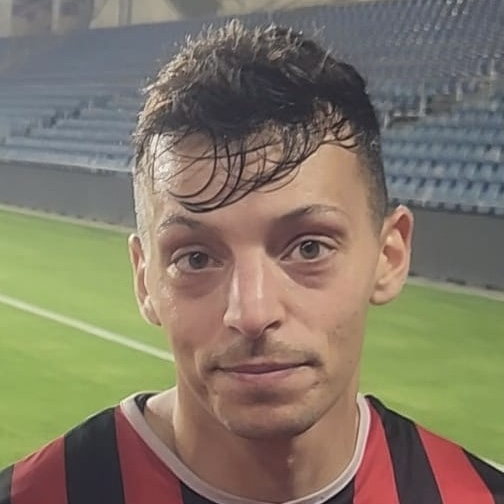
- Badash in 2023

Personal information
- Date of birth: 24 May 1994 (age 32)
- Place of birth: Kfar Saba, Israel
- Height: 1.81 m (5 ft 11 in)
- Position: Midfielder

Team information
- Current team: Hapoel Jerusalem
- Number: 24

Youth career
- –2014: Hapoel Kfar Saba

Senior career*
Years	Team	Apps	(Gls)
2014–2017	Hapoel Kfar Saba	16	(0)
2016–2017	→ Hapoel Ramat HaSharon (loan)	28	(1)
2017–2020	Hapoel Tel Aviv	4	(1)
2018–2019	→ Beitar Tel Aviv Ramla (loan)	47	(6)
2019–2020	→ Sektzia Ness Ziona (loan)	22	(0)
2020–2023	Hapoel Jerusalem	84	(16)
2023–2025	Hapoel Be'er Sheva	22	(2)
2025–	Hapoel Jerusalem	42	(7)

International career^{‡}
2022–	Israel	1	(0)
- * Club domestic league appearances and goals as of 24 June 2026 ‡ National team caps and goals as of 27 September 2022

Guy Badash (Hebrew: גיא בדש; born 24 May 1994) is an Israeli professional footballer who plays as a midfielder for Israeli Premier League club Hapoel Be'er Sheva and the Israel national team.

== Early life ==
Badash was born and raised in Kfar Saba, Israel, to an Israeli family of Jewish descent.

== International career ==
Badash made his senior International debut for the Israel national team on 27 September 2022 in a friendly match against Malta.

== See also ==
- List of Jewish footballers
- List of Jews in sports
- List of Israelis
