= Inon Eliyahu =

Israeli footballer

Personal information
- Full name: Inon Eliyahu
- Date of birth: 1 November 1993 (age 33)
- Place of birth: Jerusalem, Israel
- Positions: Right back; defensive midfielder

Team information
- Current team: Hapoel Jerusalem
- Number: 2

Youth career
- 2005–2012: Beitar Jerusalem

Senior career*
Years	Team	Apps	(Gls)
2012–2013	Ironi Modi'in	23	(5)
2013–2014	Maccabi Kiryat Malakhi	12	(1)
2014–2016	Maccabi Herzliya	32	(1)
2016–2017	Hapoel Katamon	13	(2)
2017–2019	Hapoel Acre	53	(3)
2019–2020	Hapoel Ramat Gan	24	(4)
2020–2022	Maccabi Petah Tikva	59	(1)
2022–2023	Maccabi Haifa	3	(0)
2023–2024	Hapoel Haifa	26	(2)
2025–	Hapoel Jerusalem	3	(0)
- * Club domestic league appearances and goals as of 24 June 2026

Inon Eliyahu (Hebrew: ינון אליהו; born 1 November 1993) is an Israeli professional footballer who plays as a right-back for Hapoel Jerusalem.

== Career ==
On 31 May 2022, he signed for Maccabi Haifa.

On 4 June 2023 signed for the urban team for 2 years.

== Honours ==
=== Club ===
Maccabi Haifa

- Israeli Premier League: 2022–23
