= Yinon Cohen =

Israeli sociologist

- ינון כהן
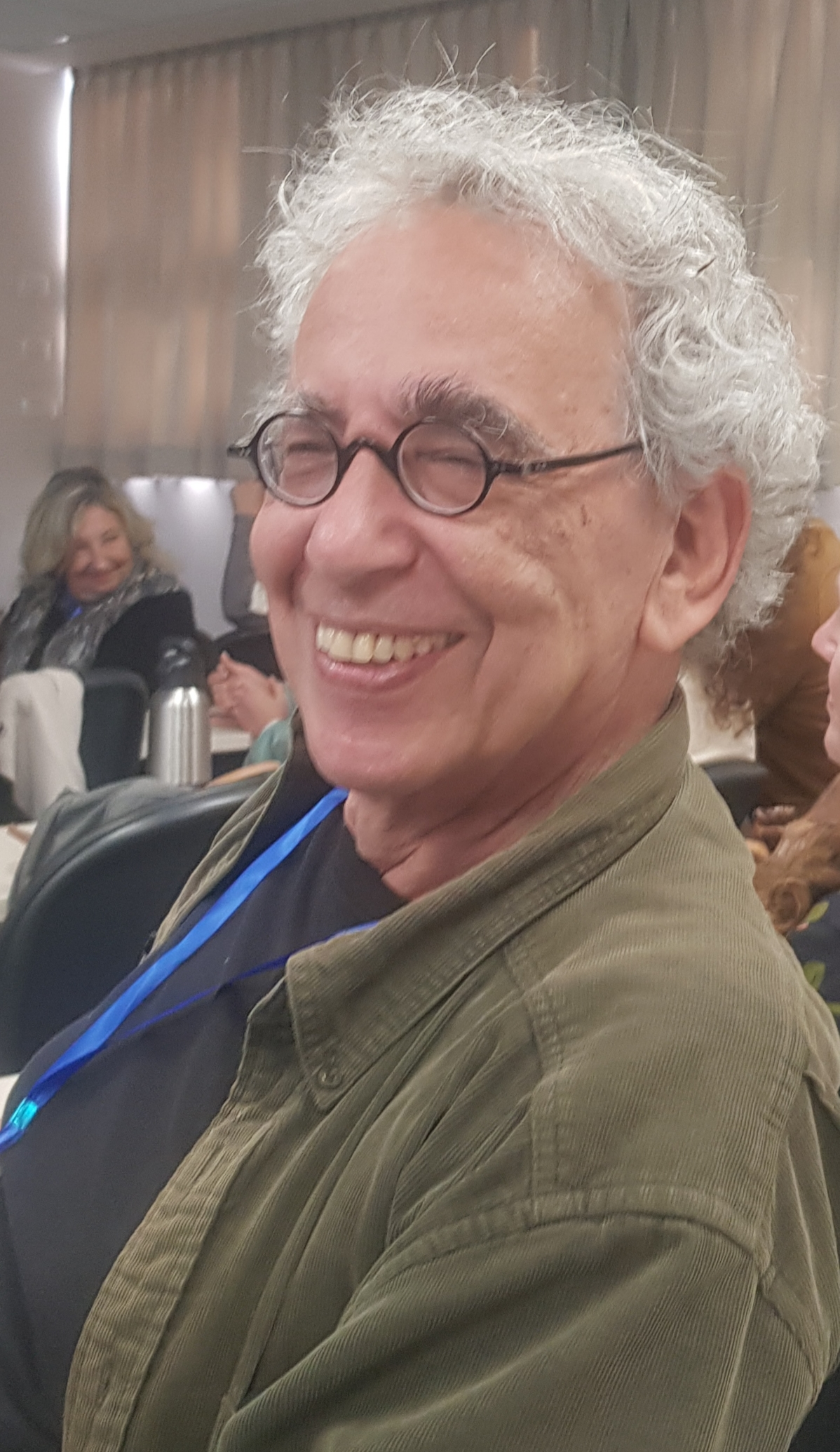

Academic background
- Education: Hebrew University (BA); Stony Brook University (PhD)

Academic work
- Discipline: Sociology
- Institutions: Columbia University

Yinon Cohen (Hebrew: ינון כהן), an Israeli sociologist, is the Yosef Hayim Yerushalmi Professor of Israel and Jewish Studies at Columbia University.

Cohen holds a B.A. from Hebrew University in Jerusalem and an M.A and Ph.D. from SUNY at Stony Brook.

He is known for his research on international migration, social stratification, and labor markets. He has studied earnings assimilation of immigrants in Israel, Germany, and the United States; socioeconomic ethnic and gender gaps in Israel; income inequality in Israel; and industrial relations in Israel.

Cohen's appointment to the Yerushalmi chair was controversial because he had criticised Israeli policy and because the search committee included two prominent critics of Israel. He is described by The Forward as "lean[ing] leftward on Israeli politics".
